= 2012–13 Air21 Express season =

- Head coach: Franz Pumaren
- Owners: Airfrieght 2100, Inc. (a Lina Group of Companies subsidiary)

Philippine Cup results
- Record: 5–9 (35.7%)
- Place: 8th
- Playoff finish: Quarterfinalist (eliminated by Talk 'N Text in one game)

Commissioner's Cup results
- Record: 6–8 (42.9%)
- Place: 8th
- Playoff finish: Quarterfinalist (eliminated by Alaska in one game)

Governors' Cup results
- Record: 3–6 (33.3%)
- Place: 10th
- Playoff finish: did not qualify

Air21 Express seasons

The 2012–13 Air21 Express season was the 2nd season of the franchise in the Philippine Basketball Association (PBA).

== Key dates ==
- August 19: The 2012 PBA Draft took place in Robinson's Midtown Mall, Manila.

== Draft picks ==
Round	Pick	Player	Position	Nationality	College
2	1	Yousef Taha	C	Philippines	North Lake/Mapúa
3	1	Simon Atkins	G	Philippines	De La Salle-Manila

== Roster ==
2012–13 Air21 Express roster
Players
Coaches

Pos.	#	POB	Name	Height	Weight	DOB (YYYY–MM–DD)	From
F/C	4	(Philippines)	Manuel, Vic	6 ft 5 in (1.96 m)	200 lb (91 kg)		PSBA
G/F	6	(Philippines)	Riego Gamalinda	6 ft 3 in (1.91 m)	184 lb (83 kg)		San Beda
SF	9	(Philippines)	Canaleta, KG	6 ft 5 in (1.96 m)	210 lb (95 kg)		UE
G	10	(Philippines)	Atkins, Simon (R)	6 ft 0 in (1.83 m)	180 lb (82 kg)		De La Salle
G	13	(Philippines)	Bonbon Custodio	5 ft 11 in (1.80 m)	175 lb (79 kg)		UE
SG	14	(Philippines)	Ren-Ren Ritualo (C)	6 ft 2 in (1.88 m)	180 lb (82 kg)		De La Salle
G/F	15	(Philippines)	Menor, Ogie	6 ft 5 in (1.96 m)	190 lb (86 kg)		San Beda
PG	16	(Philippines)	John Raymundo	5 ft 10 in (1.78 m)	170 lb (77 kg)		San Sebastian
SG	17	(Philippines)	Mark Cardona	6 ft 1 in (1.85 m)	180 lb (82 kg)		De La Salle
SG	18	(Philippines)	Joseph Yeo	6 ft 1 in (1.85 m)	175 lb (79 kg)		De La Salle
PG	19	(Philippines)	Wynne Arboleda	5 ft 11 in (1.80 m)	170 lb (77 kg)		MLQU
F/C	34	(Philippines)	Sharma, Carlo	6 ft 6 in (1.98 m)	220 lb (100 kg)		De La Salle
PF	63	(Switzerland)	Michael Burtscher	6 ft 6 in (1.98 m)	210 lb (95 kg)		Clearwater Christian
C	88	(Tonga)	Asi Taulava	6 ft 9 in (2.06 m)	245 lb (111 kg)		BYU–Hawaii
F	–	(Philippines)	Mark Borboran	6 ft 4 in (1.93 m)	170 lb (77 kg)		UE

Head coach

- (Philippines) Franz Pumaren (De La Salle)

Assistant coach(es)

- (Philippines) Tonichi Yturri (De La Salle)
- (Philippines) Jack Santiago (De La Salle)
- (Philippines) Pocholo Villanueva (De La Salle)
- (Philippines) Dan Rose
- (Philippines) Joshua Villapando

Legend

- (C) Team captain
- (CI) Commissioner's Cup Import
- (GI) Governors' Cup Import
- (EI) EASL Import
- (DP) Unsigned draft pick
- (FA) Free agent
- (IN) Inactive
- (S) Suspended
- (R) Rookie
- Injured

Roster

== Philippine Cup ==
=== Eliminations ===
==== Standings ====
Pos	Team	W	L	PCT	GB	Qualification
1	Talk 'N Text Tropang Texters	12	2	.857	—	Twice-to-beat in the quarterfinals
2	San Mig Coffee Mixers	10	4	.714	2	Twice-to-beat in the quarterfinals
3	Rain or Shine Elasto Painters	9	5	.643	3	Best-of-three quarterfinals
4	Meralco Bolts	8	6	.571 (Note: Head-to-head record: Alaska 1–1 Meralco (Meralco +4))	4	Best-of-three quarterfinals
5	Alaska Aces	8	6	.571	4	Best-of-three quarterfinals
6	Barangay Ginebra San Miguel	7	7	.500	5	Best-of-three quarterfinals
7	Petron Blaze Boosters	6	8	.429	6	Twice-to-win in the quarterfinals
8	Air21 Express	5	9	.357	7	Twice-to-win in the quarterfinals
9	Barako Bull Energy Cola	4	10	.286	8	
10	GlobalPort Batang Pier	1	13	.071	11	

Source: PBA.ph

==== Game log ====
2012–13 PBA Philippine Cup game log
October

Game	Date	Opponent	Score	High points	High rebounds	High assists	Location Attendance	Record	
1	October 3	Barako Bull	87–90	Baclao (18)	Sena (6)	Wilson, Arboleda (4)	Smart Araneta Coliseum	0–1	Boxscore
2	October 7	GlobalPort	88–81	Wilson (17)	Taha (12)	Wilson (4)	Smart Araneta Coliseum	1–1	Boxscore
3	October 12	Rain or Shine	98–99*	Wilson (21)	Isip (10)	Wilson (4)	Smart Araneta Coliseum	1–2	Boxscore
4	October 17	Talk 'N Text	89–96	Canaleta (21)	Wilson, Isip (7)	Arboleda (4)	Mall of Asia Arena	1–3	Boxscore
5	October 21	Meralco	72–85	Wilson (16)	Taha (9)	Arboleda (5)	Mall of Asia Arena	1–4	Boxscore
6	October 26	Alaska	81–92	Custodio (20)	Arboleda, Taha, Wilson (7)	Arboleda (5)	Smart Araneta Coliseum	1–5	Boxscore

November

Game	Date	Opponent	Score	High points	High rebounds	High assists	Location Attendance	Record	
7	November 2	Petron Blaze	97–76	Isip (22)	Canaleta (10)	Atkins (7)	Smart Araneta Coliseum	2–5	Boxscore
8	November 9	Barako Bull	86–85	Cortez (24)	Canaleta (8)	Cortez (6)	Cuneta Astrodome	3–5	Boxscore
9	November 14	Alaska	104–103	Canaleta (21)	Reyes (8)	Cortez (11)	Smart Araneta Coliseum	4–5	Boxscore
10	November 17	Rain or Shine	62–71	Canaleta (18)	Canaleta (12)	Baclao (4)	Tubod, Lanao del Norte	4–6	Boxscore
11	November 23	San Mig Coffee	80–89	Canaleta (18)	Canaleta (6)	Cortez (8)	Smart Araneta Coliseum	4–7	Boxscore
12	November 25	Talk 'N Text	94–100	Cortez (23)	Cortez (9)	Custodio (5)	Smart Araneta Coliseum	4–8	Boxscore
13	November 30	Barangay Ginebra	76–99	Arboleda (17)	Reyes (9)	Arboleda, Atkins (2)	Smart Araneta Coliseum	4–9	Boxscore

December

Game	Date	Opponent	Score	High points	High rebounds	High assists	Location Attendance	Record	
14	December 5	GlobalPort	113–92	Canaleta (41)	Reyes (16)	Cortez (6)	Smart Araneta Coliseum	5–9	Boxscore

2012–13 schedule

=== Playoffs ===
==== Bracket ====
Quarterfinals
(#1 twice-to-beat)
1	Talk 'N Text	105
8	Air21	100
(Best-of-3)
4	Meralco	0
5	Alaska	2
(#2 twice-to-beat)
2	San Mig Coffee	92*
7	Petron Blaze	87
(Best-of-3)
3	Rain or Shine	2
6	Barangay Ginebra	1

Semifinals (Best-of-7)
1	Talk 'N Text	4
5	Alaska	2
2	San Mig Coffee	2
3	Rain or Shine	4

Finals (Best-of-7)
1	Talk 'N Text	4
3	Rain or Shine	0

*Game went into overtime

==== Game log ====
2013 PBA Philippine Cup playoffs game log
Quarterfinals: 0–1

Game	Date	Opponent	Score	High points	High rebounds	High assists	Location Attendance	Series	
1	December 13	Talk 'N Text	100–105	Canaleta (25)	Cortez, Isip (9)	Cortez (18)	Smart Araneta Coliseum	0–1	Boxscore

2012–13 schedule

== Commissioner's Cup ==
=== Eliminations ===
==== Standings ====
Pos	Team	W	L	PCT	GB	Qualification
1	Alaska Aces	11	3	.786	—	Twice-to-beat in the quarterfinals
2	Rain or Shine Elasto Painters	9	5	.643	2	Twice-to-beat in the quarterfinals
3	Petron Blaze Boosters	8	6	.571 (Note: Head-to-head record: Petron 2–0 San Mig)	3	Best-of-three quarterfinals
4	San Mig Coffee Mixers	8	6	.571	3	Best-of-three quarterfinals
5	Meralco Bolts	7	7	.500 (Note: Head-to-head quotient: Meralco 1.01, TNT 1.00, Barangay Ginebra 0.99)	4	Best-of-three quarterfinals
6	Talk 'N Text Tropang Texters	7	7	.500	4	Best-of-three quarterfinals
7	Barangay Ginebra San Miguel	7	7	.500	4	Twice-to-win in the quarterfinals
8	Air21 Express	6	8	.429	5	Twice-to-win in the quarterfinals
9	Barako Bull Energy Cola	5	9	.357	6	
10	GlobalPort Batang Pier	2	12	.143	9	

Source: PBA.ph

==== Game log ====
2013 PBA Commissioner's Cup game log
February

Game	Date	Opponent	Score	High points	High rebounds	High assists	Location Attendance	Record	
1	February 10	Barangay Ginebra	74–70	Dunigan (26)	Dunigan (19)	Custodio (5)	Smart Araneta Coliseum	1–0	boxscore
2	February 15	Talk 'N Text	83–86	Canaleta (23)	Dunigan (7)	Cortez (5)	Smart Araneta Coliseum	1–1	boxscore
3	February 22	Barako Bull	86–91	Dunigan (30)	Dunigan (19)	Cortez (5)	Mall of Asia Arena	1–2	boxscore
4	February 27	Rain or Shine	97–99	Dunigan (22)	Dunigan (10)	Dunigan, Cortez (5)	Smart Araneta Coliseum	1–3	boxscore

March

Game	Date	Opponent	Score	High points	High rebounds	High assists	Location Attendance	Record	
5	March 1	Petron Blaze	53–60	Dunigan (15)	Dunigan (23)	Cortez (3)	Smart Araneta Coliseum	1–4	boxscore
6	March 6	Meralco	88–89	Dunigan (40)	Dunigan (16)	Cortez (7)	Smart Araneta Coliseum	1–5	boxscore
7	March 10	GlobalPort	106–94	Dunigan (35)	Dunigan (20)	Cortez, Arboleda (5)	Smart Araneta Coliseum	2–5	boxscore
8	March 15	Alaska	74–68	Dunigan (25)	Dunigan (14)	Cortez (5)	Ynares Center	3–5	Boxscore
9	March 20	San Mig Coffee	87–82	Dunigan (25)	Dunigan (20)	Cortez (6)	Cuneta Astrodome	4–5	Boxscore
10	March 23	GlobalPort	87–82	Dunigan (22)	Dunigan (15)	Dunigan (8)	Smart Araneta Coliseum	5–5	boxscore
11	March 31	Rain or Shine	83–94	Dunigan (34)	Dunigan (15)	Dunigan (6)	Mall of Asia Arena	5–6	Boxscore

April

Game	Date	Opponent	Score	High points	High rebounds	High assists	Location Attendance	Record	
12	April 3	Barangay Ginebra	84–90	Canaleta (29)	Dunigan (8)	Custodio (4)	Smart Araneta Coliseum	5–7	Boxscore
13	April 10	San Mig Coffee	66–80	Canaleta (26)	Dunigan (17)	Custodio (3)	Smart Araneta Coliseum	5–8	Boxscore
14	April 13	Petron Blaze	95–91	Canaleta (37)	Dunigan (17)	Dunigan (6)	Mall of Asia Arena	6–8	Boxscore

2012–13 schedule

=== Playoffs ===
==== Bracket ====
Quarterfinals
(#1 twice-to-beat)
1	Alaska	87
8	Air21	81
(Best-of-3)
4	San Mig Coffee	2
5	Meralco	1
(#2 twice-to-beat)
2	Rain or Shine	83	79
7	Barangay Ginebra	90	81
(Best-of-3)
3	Petron	0
6	Talk 'N Text	2

Semifinals (Best-of-5)
1	Alaska	3
4	San Mig Coffee	1
7	Barangay Ginebra	3
6	Talk 'N Text	2

Finals (Best-of-5)
1	Alaska	3
7	Barangay Ginebra	0

==== Game log ====
2016 PBA Commissioner's Cup playoffs game log
Quarterfinals: 0–1

Game	Date	Opponent	Score	High points	High rebounds	High assists	Location Attendance	Series	
1	December 13	Alaska	100–105	Canaleta (16)	Dunigan (11)	Dunigan (7)	Mall of Asia Arena	0–1	Boxscore

2012–13 schedule

== Governors' Cup ==
=== Eliminations ===
==== Standings ====
Pos	Team	W	L	PCT	GB	Qualification
1	Petron Blaze Boosters	8	1	.889	—	Twice-to-beat in the quarterfinals
2	San Mig Coffee Mixers	6	3	.667	2	Twice-to-beat in the quarterfinals
3	Meralco Bolts	5	4	.556 (Note: Head-to-head record: Meralco 1–0 Rain or Shine)	3	Twice-to-beat in the quarterfinals
4	Rain or Shine Elasto Painters	5	4	.556	3	Twice-to-beat in the quarterfinals
5	GlobalPort Batang Pier	4	5	.444 (Note: Head-to-head quotient: GlobalPort 1.01, Barako Bull 1.00, Alaska 0.99)	4	Twice-to-win in the quarterfinals
6	Barako Bull Energy	4	5	.444	4	Twice-to-win in the quarterfinals
7	Alaska Aces	4	5	.444	4	Twice-to-win in the quarterfinals
8	Barangay Ginebra San Miguel	3	6	.333 (Note: Head-to-head quotient: Talk 'N Text 1.05, Barangay Ginebra 1.00, Air21 0.96; eighth seed playoff: Barangay Ginebra 110–102 Talk 'N Text)	5	Twice-to-win in the quarterfinals
9	Talk 'N Text Tropang Texters	3	6	.333	5	
10	Air21 Express	3	6	.333	5	

Source: PBA.ph

==== Game log ====
2013 PBA Governors' Cup game log
February

Game	Date	Opponent	Score	High points	High rebounds	High assists	Location Attendance	Record
1	August 14	GlobalPort					Mall of Asia Arena	
2	August 17	San Mig Coffee					Ynares Center	
3	August 25	Barako Bull					Mall of Asia Arena	
4	August 28	Petron Blaze					Mall of Asia Arena	
5	August 31	Rain or Shine					Mall of Asia Arena	

2012–13 schedule

== Transactions ==
=== Trades ===
==== Pre-season ====
August 23, 2012	To Air21 Nonoy Baclao (from Petron Blaze); Robert Reyes(from Petron Blaze); KG Canaleta (from Barangay Ginebra); John Wilson (from Barangay Ginebra)	To Petron Blaze Magi Sison (from Air21); Paolo Hubalde (from Air21); 2014 second round pick (from Air21)	To Barangay Ginebra Elmer Espiritu (from Air21); 2013 first round pick (from Air21)

September 20, 2012	To Air21 Bonbon Custodio	To Alaska 2014 2nd round pick

==== Philippine Cup ====
November 7, 2012	To Air21 Mike Cortez	To Barangay Ginebra Yousef Taha

==== Commissioner's Cup ====
July 17, 2013	To Air21 Vic Manuel; Carlo Sharma; 2016 2nd round pick	To Meralco Nonoy Baclao; John Wilson

==== Governors' Cup ====
September 7, 2013	To Air21 Asi Taulava; Mark Borboran	To Meralco Mike Cortez; James Sena

October 14, 2013	To Air21 Rabeh Al-Hussaini	To Talk 'N Text Rob Reyes; 2015 2nd draft pick

October 14, 2013	To Air21 Mark Cardona; Nonoy Baclao	To Meralco Rabeh Al-Hussaini; Nelbert Omolon

October 14, 2013	To Air21 Pamboy Raymundo; Bambam Gamalinda	To Talk 'N Text Nonoy Baclao; Eric Salamat

=== Recruited imports ===
Tournament	Name	Debuted	Last game	Record
Commissioner's Cup	Michael Dunigan	February 10 (vs. Brgy. Ginebra)	April 20 (vs. Alaska)	6–9
Governors' Cup	Zach Graham	August 14 (vs. GlobalPort)	September 22 (vs. Alaska Aces)	3–6
