= NCAA Season 90 basketball tournaments =

Basketball season

NCAA Season 90
- Host school: José Rizal University
Men's Finals	G1	G2	Wins
San Beda Red Lions	74	89	2
Arellano Chiefs	66	70	0
- Duration: October 20–22, 2014
- Arena(s): Mall of Asia Arena
- Finals MVP: Anthony Semerad
- Winning coach: Boyet Fernandez (2nd title)
- Semifinalists: JRU Heavy Bombers; Perpetual Altas
- TV network(s): AksyonTV, TV5
Juniors' Finals	G1	G2	G3 (OT)	Wins
Mapúa Red Robins	84	68	65	1
San Beda Red Cubs	75	78	78	2
- Duration: October 20–25, 2014
- Arena(s): Mall of Asia Arena
- Finals MVP: Joshua Andrei Caracut
- Winning coach: JB Sison (2nd title)
- Semifinalists: Letran Squires; JRU Light Bombers
- TV network(s): AksyonTV, TV5

The basketball tournaments of NCAA Season 90 were the Philippines' National Collegiate Athletic Association tournaments for the 90th season. The José Rizal University hosted the season, starting with an opening ceremony held on June 28, 2014 at the Mall of Asia Arena followed by a double-header. Games were held at the Filoil Flying V Arena in San Juan, with two seniors and juniors games every Mondays, Wednesdays, and Fridays and one senior and junior game every Saturday. The men's games were aired live by TV5 and AksyonTV.

== Men's tournament ==
=== Teams ===
Team	College	Coach
Arellano Chiefs	Arellano University (AU)	(Philippines) Jerry Codiñera
Letran Knights	Colegio de San Juan de Letran (CSJL)	(Philippines) Caloy Garcia
Benilde Blazers	De La Salle–College of Saint Benilde (CSB)	(Philippines) Gabby Velasco
EAC Generals	Emilio Aguinaldo College (EAC)	(Philippines) Gerry Esplana
JRU Heavy Bombers	José Rizal University (JRU)	(Philippines) Vergel Meneses
Lyceum Pirates	Lyceum of the Philippines University (LPU)	(Philippines) Bonnie Tan
Mapúa Cardinals	Mapúa Institute of Technology (MIT)	(Philippines) Atoy Co
San Beda Red Lions	San Beda College (SBC)	(Philippines) Boyet Fernandez
San Sebastian Stags	San Sebastian College – Recoletos (SSC-R)	(Philippines) Topex Robinson
Perpetual Altas	University of Perpetual Help System DALTA (UPHSD)	(Philippines) Aric del Rosario

==== Changes from last season ====
Full member (from probationary member):

- Arellano Chiefs

=== Elimination round ===
The elimination round was marked by a bench-clearing brawl between Mapua and EAC on their second round game at the Arena in San Juan on September 22, 2014. EAC's John Tayongtong punched CJ Isit, then a free-for all ensued. The game was abandoned with 28.5 seconds remaining, with the score at the time of stoppage as the final score

==== Team standings ====
Pos	Team	W	L	PCT	GB	Qualification
1	San Beda Red Lions	13	5	.722 (Note: First-seed playoff: San Beda 97–69 Arellano)	—	Twice-to-beat in the semifinals
2	Arellano Chiefs	13	5	.722	—	Twice-to-beat in the semifinals
3	JRU Heavy Bombers (H)	12	6	.667 (Note: Third-seed playoff: JRU 82–79 UPHSD)	1	Twice-to-win in the semifinals
4	Perpetual Altas	12	6	.667	1	Twice-to-win in the semifinals
5	Benilde Blazers	11	7	.611	2	
6	Letran Knights	9	9	.500	4	
7	Lyceum Pirates (X)	7	11	.389	6	
8	San Sebastian Stags	5	13	.278	8	
9	EAC Generals (X)	4	14	.222 (Note: Head-to-head record: EAC 2–0 Mapúa)	9	
10	Mapúa Cardinals	4	14	.222	9	

Source: ABS-CBN Sports
Rules for classification: 1) winning percentage; 2) if tied for top 4 seeds, or for #4 seed, one-game playoff; 3) head-to-head record]]; 4) overall point differential
(H) Hosts; (X) Under probation

==== Match-up results ====
	Round 1									Round 2								
Team ╲ Game	1	2	3	4	5	6	7	8	9	10	11	12	13	14	15	16	17	18
Arellano	Lyceum school colors	EAC school colors	San Beda school colors	Mapua school colors	SSC-R school colors	UPHD school colors	JRU school colors	Letran school colors	CSB school colors	SSC-R school colors	Mapua school colors	UPHD school colors	CSB school colors	JRU school colors	EAC school colors	Letran school colors	San Beda school colors	Lyceum school colors
Letran	SSC-R school colors	Lyceum school colors	Mapua school colors	JRU school colors	CSB school colors	EAC school colors	Arellano school colors	UPHD school colors	San Beda school colors	JRU school colors	UPHD school colors	EAC school colors	SSC-R school colors	San Beda school colors	Arellano school colors	Mapua school colors	Lyceum school colors	CSB school colors
Benilde	EAC school colors	JRU school colors	SSC-R school colors	Letran school colors	Mapua school colors	San Beda school colors	Lyceum school colors	Arellano school colors	UPHD school colors	EAC school colors	Lyceum school colors	San Beda school colors	SSC-R school colors	Arellano school colors	JRU school colors	UPHD school colors	Mapua school colors	Letran school colors
EAC	CSB school colors	Arellano school colors	UPHD school colors	San Beda school colors	Lyceum school colors	Letran school colors	Mapua school colors	JRU school colors	SSC-R school colors	CSB school colors	JRU school colors	Letran school colors	San Beda school colors	Lyceum school colors	Arellano school colors	Mapua school colors	UPHD school colors	SSC-R school colors
JRU	San Beda school colors	SSC-R school colors	CSB school colors	Letran school colors	Lyceum school colors	UPHD school colors	Arellano school colors	EAC school colors	Mapua school colors	Letran school colors	EAC school colors	Lyceum school colors	UPHD school colors	Arellano school colors	CSB school colors	San Beda school colors	Mapua school colors	SSC-R school colors
Lyceum	Arellano school colors	Letran school colors	San Beda school colors	Mapua school colors	JRU school colors	EAC school colors	UPHD school colors	CSB school colors	SSC-R school colors	UPHD school colors	CSB school colors	JRU school colors	Mapua school colors	EAC school colors	San Beda school colors	SSC-R school colors	Letran school colors	Arellano school colors
Mapúa	UPHD school colors	San Beda school colors	Letran school colors	Lyceum school colors	Arellano school colors	CSB school colors	SSC-R school colors	EAC school colors	JRU school colors	San Beda school colors	Arellano school colors	SSC-R school colors	Lyceum school colors	UPHD school colors	EAC school colors	Letran school colors	JRU school colors	CSB school colors
San Beda	JRU school colors	Mapua school colors	Lyceum school colors	Arellano school colors	EAC school colors	CSB school colors	SSC-R school colors	UPHD school colors	Letran school colors	Mapua school colors	SSC-R school colors	CSB school colors	EAC school colors	Letran school colors	Lyceum school colors	UPHD school colors	JRU school colors	Arellano school colors
San Sebastian	Letran school colors	JRU school colors	UPHD school colors	CSB school colors	Arellano school colors	Mapua school colors	San Beda school colors	Lyceum school colors	EAC school colors	Arellano school colors	San Beda school colors	Mapua school colors	CSB school colors	Letran school colors	Lyceum school colors	EAC school colors	UPHD school colors	JRU school colors
Perpetual	Mapua school colors	SSC-R school colors	EAC school colors	JRU school colors	Arellano school colors	Lyceum school colors	San Beda school colors	Letran school colors	CSB school colors	Lyceum school colors	Letran school colors	Arellano school colors	JRU school colors	Mapua school colors	San Beda school colors	EAC school colors	CSB school colors	SSC-R school colors

= Win; = OT win; = Win by forfeit; = Loss; = OT loss; = Loss by forfeit

==== Scores ====
Team	AU	CSJL	CSB	EAC	JRU	LPU	MIT	SBC	SSC-R	UPHSD
Arellano Chiefs		63–62	67–66	80–73	98–99***	93–80	68–63	81–90	96–86	97–85
Letran Knights	70–79		71–85	63–61	60–69	70–74	79–67	64–53	83–85	82–85
Benilde Blazers	106–97	64–57		72–81	61–69	86–77	79–72	83–76	72–74	77–73
EAC Generals	88–105	70–79	76–83		55–61	67–73	89–78	55–81	71–56	65–73
JRU Heavy Bombers	69–75	77–84*	69–71	73–54		80–84*	87–78	49–57	81–88	62–61
Lyceum Pirates	101–95	52–77	66–74	91–75	43–67		80–78	68–84	71–64	62–78
Mapúa Cardinals	79–82	0–20 (Note: Due to the suspensions due to the bench-clearing brawl in the second round game between EAC and Mapua, both teams had less than five players in the immediately succeeding games. Both teams decided to forfeit the games where they had less than five players instead of playing.)	76–87	77–86 (Note: EAC was leading 86–77 when the game was suddenly halted with 28.5 seconds remaining in the fourth quarter. A bench-clearing brawl started when EAC's John Tayongtong bumped into Mapua's CJ Isit at halfcourt. Mapua's Hesed Gabo responded by elbowing Tayongtong, and the situation escalated when Tayongtong threw a punch that sent Isit to the floor. Next, players from both teams spilled into the court, with the referees, bouncers, and coaches trying to put a stop to the melee. It was later announced that NCAA Commissioner Bai Cristobal had decided to abandon the game, awarding EAC a 86–77 victory.)	0–20	76–65		55–89	89–81	57–91
San Beda Red Lions	76–78	73–44	78–54	96–80	65–74	76–60	74–69		75–56	77–75
San Sebastian Stags	98–101	73–75	74–80	107–73	77–82	82–66	73–75	79–86		79–82
Perpetual Altas	101–86	67–64	65–62	20–0	76–80*	65–60	81–91	76–75	92–76	

Legend: Blue = left column team win; Red = top row team win.
Matches with lighter background shading were decided after overtime.

=== First seed playoff ===
Winner faces the #4 seed, while loser faces the #3 seed, in the semifinals (the #3 and #4 seed were to be determined on the next game). Either way, both teams had twice-to-beat advantage in the semifinals.

AksyonTV and TV5

October 10
4:00 p.m.

San Beda Red Lions	97–69	Arellano Chiefs

Filoil Flying V Arena, San Juan

=== Third seed playoff ===
Winner faces Arellano, while loser faces San Beda, in the semifinals. Either way, both teams have to win twice in the semifinals to progress.

AksyonTV

October 10
2:00 p.m.

Perpetual Altas	79–82	JRU Heavy Bombers

Filoil Flying V Arena, San Juan

=== Bracket ===
Semifinals (Top 2 twice-to-beat)
1	San Beda	81
4	Perpetual	75
2	Arellano	72
3	JRU	65

Finals (Best-of-three playoff)
1	San Beda	74	89
2	Arellano	65	70

=== Semifinals ===
San Beda and Arellano had the twice-to-beat advantage; they only had to win once, while their opponents twice, to advance to the Finals.

==== (1) San Beda vs. (4) Perpetual ====
AksyonTV

October 15
2:00 p.m.

San Beda Red Lions	81–75	Perpetual Altas
San Beda wins series in one game

Mall of Asia Arena, Pasay

==== (2) Arellano vs. (3) JRU ====
AksyonTV and TV5

October 15
4:00 p.m.

Arellano Chiefs	72–65	JRU Heavy Bombers
Arellano wins series in one game

Mall of Asia Arena, Pasay

=== Finals ===
The finals is a best-of-3 series.

AksyonTV and TV5

October 20
4:00 p.m.

San Beda Red Lions	74–66	Arellano Chiefs

Mall of Asia Arena, Pasay

AksyonTV and TV5

October 22
1:30 p.m.

San Beda Red Lions	89–70	Arellano Chiefs
San Beda wins series 2-0

Mall of Asia Arena, Pasay

- Finals Most Valuable Player: Anthony Semerad (San Beda Red Lions)

=== Awards ===
NCAA Season 90 men's basketball champions
San Beda Red Lions
19th title, fifth consecutive title

- Most Valuable Player: Scottie Thompson (Perpetual Altas)
- Rookie of the Year: Dioncee Holts (Arellano Chiefs)
- Mythical Five:
  - Scottie Thompson (Perpetual Altas)
  - Harold Arboleda (Perpetual Altas)
  - Jio Jalalon (Arellano Chiefs)
  - Ola Adeogun (San Beda Red Lions)
  - Bradwyn Guinto (San Sebastian Stags)
- All-Defensive Team:
  - Joseph Gabayni (Lyceum Pirates)
  - Scottie Thompson (Perpetual Altas)
  - Ola Adeogun (San Beda Red Lions)
  - Bradwyn Guinto (San Sebastian Stags)
  - Abdul Wahab Abdul Razak (JRU Heavy Bombers)
- Most Improved Player: Jio Jalalon (Arellano Chiefs)
- Defensive Player of the Year: Joseph Gabayni (Lyceum Pirates)

=== All-Star Game ===
The 10 member schools were divided into East and West. The East squad is represented by players from San Beda College, University of Perpetual Help, Arellano University, Jose Rizal University and San Sebastian College-Recoletos, while the West team draws from Lyceum of the Philippines University, Emilio Aguinaldo College, College of Saint Benilde, Mapua Institute of Technology, and Colegio de San Juan de Letran.

Team East was coached by Boyet Fernandez of the Red Lions, while Caloy Garcia of the Knights calls the shots of Team West.

AksyonTV, TV5

August 16
3:00 p.m.

East	104–97	West
Scoring by quarter: 22-22, 45-45, 76–71, 104-97

Filoil Flying V Arena

== Juniors' tournament ==
=== Elimination round ===
==== Team standings ====
Pos	Team	W	L	PCT	GB	Qualification
1	Mapúa Red Robins	15	3	.833 (Note: First-seed playoff: Mapúa 87–78 San Beda)	—	Twice-to-beat in the semifinals
2	San Beda Red Cubs	15	3	.833	—	Twice-to-beat in the semifinals
3	Letran Squires	13	5	.722	2	Twice-to-win in the semifinals
4	JRU Light Bombers (H)	12	6	.667	3	Twice-to-win in the semifinals
5	La Salle Green Hills Greenies	10	8	.556 (Note: Head-to-head record: LSGH 2–0 San Sebastian)	5	
6	San Sebastian Staglets	10	8	.556	5	
7	Arellano Braves	6	12	.333	9	
8	Lyceum Junior Pirates (X)	4	14	.222 (Note: Head-to-head record: Lyceum 1–1 UPHSD (Lyceum +3))	11	
9	Perpetual Junior Altas	4	14	.222	11	
10	EAC–ICA Brigadiers (X)	1	17	.056	14	

Source: ABS-CBN Sports
Rules for classification: 1) winning percentage; 2) if tied for top 4 seeds, or for #4 seed, one-game playoff; 3) head-to-head record; 4) overall point differential
(H) Hosts; (X) Under probation

==== Match-up results ====
	Round 1									Round 2								
Team ╲ Game	1	2	3	4	5	6	7	8	9	10	11	12	13	14	15	16	17	18
AU	Lyceum school colors	EAC school colors	San Beda school colors	Mapua school colors	SSC-R school colors	UPHD school colors	JRU school colors	Letran school colors	CSB school colors	SSC-R school colors	Mapua school colors	UPHD school colors	CSB school colors	JRU school colors	EAC school colors	Lyceum school colors	Letran school colors	San Beda school colors
CSJL	SSC-R school colors	Lyceum school colors	Mapua school colors	JRU school colors	CSB school colors	EAC school colors	Arellano school colors	UPHD school colors	San Beda school colors	JRU school colors	UPHD school colors	EAC school colors	SSC-R school colors	San Beda school colors	CSB school colors	Arellano school colors	Mapua school colors	Lyceum school colors
EAC–ICA	CSB school colors	Arellano school colors	UPHD school colors	San Beda school colors	Lyceum school colors	Letran school colors	Mapua school colors	JRU school colors	SSC-R school colors	CSB school colors	JRU school colors	Letran school colors	San Beda school colors	Lyceum school colors	Arellano school colors	Mapua school colors	UPHD school colors	SSC-R school colors
JRU	San Beda school colors	SSC-R school colors	CSB school colors	Letran school colors	Lyceum school colors	UPHD school colors	Arellano school colors	EAC school colors	Mapua school colors	Letran school colors	EAC school colors	Lyceum school colors	UPHD school colors	Arellano school colors	SSC-R school colors	CSB school colors	San Beda school colors	Mapua school colors
LPU	Arellano school colors	Letran school colors	San Beda school colors	Mapua school colors	JRU school colors	EAC school colors	UPHD school colors	CSB school colors	SSC-R school colors	UPHD school colors	CSB school colors	JRU school colors	Mapua school colors	EAC school colors	San Beda school colors	Arellano school colors	SSC-R school colors	Letran school colors
LSGH	EAC school colors	JRU school colors	SSC-R school colors	Letran school colors	Mapua school colors	San Beda school colors	Lyceum school colors	Arellano school colors	UPHD school colors	EAC school colors	Lyceum school colors	San Beda school colors	SSC-R school colors	Arellano school colors	Mapua school colors	Letran school colors	JRU school colors	UPHD school colors
MHSS	UPHD school colors	San Beda school colors	Letran school colors	Lyceum school colors	Arellano school colors	CSB school colors	SSC-R school colors	EAC school colors	JRU school colors	San Beda school colors	Arellano school colors	SSC-R school colors	Lyceum school colors	UPHD school colors	CSB school colors	EAC school colors	Letran school colors	JRU school colors
SBC–R	JRU school colors	Mapua school colors	Lyceum school colors	Arellano school colors	EAC school colors	CSB school colors	SSC-R school colors	UPHD school colors	Letran school colors	Mapua school colors	SSC-R school colors	CSB school colors	EAC school colors	Letran school colors	Lyceum school colors	UPHD school colors	JRU school colors	Arellano school colors
SSC–R	Letran school colors	JRU school colors	UPHD school colors	CSB school colors	Arellano school colors	Mapua school colors	San Beda school colors	Lyceum school colors	EAC school colors	Arellano school colors	San Beda school colors	Mapua school colors	CSB school colors	Letran school colors	UPHD school colors	JRU school colors	Lyceum school colors	EAC school colors
UPHSD	Mapua school colors	SSC-R school colors	EAC school colors	JRU school colors	Lyceum school colors	Arellano school colors	San Beda school colors	Letran school colors	CSB school colors	Lyceum school colors	Letran school colors	Arellano school colors	JRU school colors	Mapua school colors	SSC-R school colors	San Beda school colors	EAC school colors	CSB school colors

= Win; = OT win; = Loss; = OT loss

==== Scores ====
Team	AU	CSJL	EAC-ICA	JRU	LPU	LSGH	MHSS	SBC-R	SSC-R	UPHSD
Arellano Braves		62–79	106–86	68–70	88–59	59–60	64–71	66–99	77–74	81–68
Letran Squires	85–70		80–68	65–50	69–60	64–58	59–57	48–70	59–62	78–65
EAC-ICA Brigadiers	80–75	42–66		55–61	57–59	62–77	57–92	66–78	80–81	77–84
JRU Light Bombers	62–53	39–47	71–63		64–61	62–63	63–57	76–74	75–60	98–65
LPU Cavite Junior Pirates	85–97	75–80	67–62	58–67		68–63	61–63	69–94	66–72	68–62
La Salle Green Hills Greenies	88–77	55–62*	86–45	71–79	71–52		75–82	61–64	79–78	60–63
Malayan Red Robins	96–75	62–42	80–52	66–49	94–48	67–55		89–97*	80–54	104–53
San Beda Red Cubs	98–93	70–62	91–75	84–67	90–76	59–70	67–63		65–70	106–75
San Sebastian Staglets	70–67	88–83	91–80	83–99	77–72	78–81	57–72	61–84		85–68
Perpetual Junior Altas	85–92	56–96	85–82	74–86	79–76	68–94	96–52	78–94	69–81	

Legend: Blue = left column team win; Red = top row team win.
Matches with lighter background shading were decided after overtime.

=== First-seed playoff ===
October 10
12:00 p.m.

San Beda Red Cubs	78–87	Mapúa Red Robins

Mall of Asia Arena, Pasay

=== Bracket ===
Semifinals (Top 2 twice-to-beat)
1	Malayan	76
4	JRU	68
2	San Beda–Rizal	70
3	Letran	64

Finals (Best-of-three playoff)
1	Malayan	84	68	65
2	San Beda–Rizal	75	78	78

=== Semifinals ===
Mapúa and San Beda had the twice-to-beat advantage; they only had to win once, while their opponents twice, to advance to the Finals.

==== (1) Malayan vs. (4) JRU ====
October 15, 2014
12:00 p.m.

Mapúa Red Robins	76–68	JRU Light Bombers

Mall of Asia Arena, Pasay

==== (2) San Beda vs. (3) Letran ====
October 15, 2014
6:00 p.m.

San Beda Red Cubs	70–64	Letran Squires

Mall of Asia Arena, Pasay

=== Finals ===
This finals is a best-of-3 series.

October 20, 2014
12:00 p.m.

Mapúa Red Robins	84–75	San Beda Red Cubs

Mall of Asia Arena, Pasay

October 22, 2014
12:00 p.m.

Mapúa Red Robins	68–78	San Beda Red Cubs

Mall of Asia Arena, Pasay

October 25, 2014
2:30 p.m.

Mapúa Red Robins	65–78 (OT)	San Beda Red Cubs
San Beda wins series 2-1

Mall of Asia Arena, Pasay

- Finals Most Valuable Player: Joshua Andrei Caracut (San Beda Red Cubs)

=== Awards ===
NCAA Season 90 juniors' basketball champions
San Beda Red Cubs
21st title, sixth consecutive title

- Most Valuable Player: Darius Estrella (JRU Light Bombers)
- Rookie of the Year: Raphael Jose Chavez (Perpetual Junior Altas)
- Mythical Five:
  - Darius Estrella (JRU Light Bombers)
  - Dennel Jay Aguirre (Mapúa Red Robins)
  - Ricci Paolo Rivero (La Salle Green Hills Greenies)
  - John Winifred Gob (La Salle Green Hills Greenies)
  - Niko Angelo Abatayo (San Beda Red Cubs)
- Defensive Player of the Year: John Winifred Gob (La Salle Green Hills Greenies)
- All-Defensive Team:
  - Darius Estrella (JRU Light Bombers)
  - John Winifred Gob (La Salle Green Hills Greenies)
  - Niko Angelo Abatayo (San Beda Red Cubs)
  - Raphael Jose Chavez (Perpetual Junior Altas)
  - Makki Jamdee Santos (Lyceum Junior Pirates)
- Most Improved Player: John Winifred Gob (La Salle Green Hills Greenies)

== See also ==
- UAAP Season 77 basketball tournaments

Preceded by Season 89 (2013)	NCAA basketball seasons Season 90 (2014)	Succeeded by Season 91 (2015)
