= 2012–13 Meralco Bolts season =

- Head coach: Ryan Gregorio
- General manager: Butch Antonio
- Owners: Manila Electric Company (an MVP Group subsidiary)

Philippine Cup results
- Record: 8–6 (57.1%)
- Place: 4th
- Playoff finish: Quarterfinalist (eliminated by Alaska Aces in two games)

Commissioner's Cup results
- Record: 7–7 (50%)
- Place: 5th
- Playoff finish: Quarterfinalist (def by. San Mig Coffee, 2–1)

Governors' Cup results
- Record: 5–4 (55.6%)
- Place: 3rd
- Playoff finish: Semifinalist (def by. San Mig Coffee, 3–1)

Meralco Bolts seasons

The 2012–13 Meralco Bolts season was the 3rd season of the franchise in the Philippine Basketball Association (PBA).

== Key dates ==
- August 19: The 2012 PBA Draft took place in Robinson's Midtown Mall, Manila.

== Draft picks ==
| Round | Pick | Player | Position | Nationality | College |
|---|---|---|---|---|---|
| 1 | 4 | Cliff Hodge | F | United States | Hawaii Pacific |
| 2 | 7 | Kelly Nabong | C/F | Philippines | Santa Rosa JC |
| 3 | 4 | Janus Lozada | G/F | Philippines | Adamson |
| 4 | 2 | Eric Suguitan | C | Philippines | ACSAT |

== Roster ==
2012–13 Meralco Bolts roster
Players
Coaches

| Pos. | # | POB | Name | Height | Weight | DOB (YYYY–MM–DD) | From |
|---|---|---|---|---|---|---|---|
| G | 1 | (United States) | Mike Cortez | 6 ft 0 in (1.83 m) | 185 lb (84 kg) | | De La Salle |
| SG | 2 | (Philippines) | John Wilson | 6 ft 1 in (1.85 m) | 185 lb (84 kg) | | José Rizal |
| PG | 4 | (Philippines) | Allan Mangahas | 6 ft 0 in (1.83 m) | 170 lb (77 kg) | | Mapúa |
| PG | 6 | (United States) | Chris Ross (C) | 6 ft 1 in (1.85 m) | 180 lb (82 kg) | | Marshall |
| PF | 7–1 | (United States) | Cliff Hodge (R) | 6 ft 5 in (1.96 m) | 195 lb (88 kg) | | Hawaii Pacific |
| C | 8 | (Philippines) | Don Allado | 6 ft 6 in (1.98 m) | 220 lb (100 kg) | | De La Salle |
| G | 13 | (United States) | Chris Timberlake | 5 ft 10 in (1.78 m) | 182 lb (83 kg) | | North Florida |
| SG | 14 | (Philippines) | Mark Cardona | 6 ft 1 in (1.85 m) | 180 lb (82 kg) | | De La Salle |
| F | 15 | (Philippines) | Nonoy Baclao | 6 ft 6 in (1.98 m) | 210 lb (95 kg) | | Ateneo |
| C | 19 | (Philippines) | Jay-R Reyes | 6 ft 8 in (2.03 m) | 215 lb (98 kg) | | UP Diliman |
| G/F | 20 | (United States) | Jared Dillinger | 6 ft 5 in (1.96 m) | 220 lb (100 kg) | | Air Force |
| PF | 21 | (Philippines) | Reynel Hugnatan | 6 ft 4 in (1.93 m) | 210 lb (95 kg) | | Manila |
| G/F | 22 | (United States) | Josh Vanlandingham | 6 ft 4 in (1.93 m) | 205 lb (93 kg) | | Pacific Lutheran |
| SF | 24 | (Philippines) | Rey Guevarra | 6 ft 3 in (1.91 m) | 175 lb (79 kg) | | Letran |
| F/C | 31 | (Philippines) | James Sena | 6 ft 5 in (1.96 m) | 215 lb (98 kg) | | José Rizal |
| SF | 80 | (Philippines) | Sunday Salvacion | 6 ft 3 in (1.91 m) | 190 lb (86 kg) | | St. Benilde |

Head coach

- (Philippines) Ryan Gregorio (UP Diliman)

Assistant coach(es)

- (Philippines) Jong Uichico (De La Salle)
- (Philippines) Boyet Fernandez (CSA–Bacolod)
- (Philippines) Ronnie Magsanoc (UP Diliman)
- (Philippines) Patrick Fran (UST)
- (Philippines) Xavier Nunag (UP Diliman)

Team manager

- (Philippines) Butch Antonio

Legend

- (C) Team captain
- (CI) Commissioner's Cup Import
- (GI) Governors' Cup Import
- (EI) EASL Import
- (DP) Unsigned draft pick
- (FA) Free agent
- (IN) Inactive
- (S) Suspended
- (R) Rookie
- Injured

Roster

== Philippine Cup ==
=== Eliminations ===
==== Standings ====
| Pos | Team | W | L | PCT | GB | Qualification |
|---|---|---|---|---|---|---|
| 1 | Talk 'N Text Tropang Texters | 12 | 2 | .857 | — | Twice-to-beat in the quarterfinals |
| 2 | San Mig Coffee Mixers | 10 | 4 | .714 | 2 | Twice-to-beat in the quarterfinals |
| 3 | Rain or Shine Elasto Painters | 9 | 5 | .643 | 3 | Best-of-three quarterfinals |
| 4 | Meralco Bolts | 8 | 6 | .571 (Note: Head-to-head record: Alaska 1–1 Meralco (Meralco +4)) | 4 | Best-of-three quarterfinals |
| 5 | Alaska Aces | 8 | 6 | .571 | 4 | Best-of-three quarterfinals |
| 6 | Barangay Ginebra San Miguel | 7 | 7 | .500 | 5 | Best-of-three quarterfinals |
| 7 | Petron Blaze Boosters | 6 | 8 | .429 | 6 | Twice-to-win in the quarterfinals |
| 8 | Air21 Express | 5 | 9 | .357 | 7 | Twice-to-win in the quarterfinals |
| 9 | Barako Bull Energy Cola | 4 | 10 | .286 | 8 | |
| 10 | GlobalPort Batang Pier | 1 | 13 | .071 | 11 | |

Source: PBA.ph

==== Game log ====
2013 PBA Philippine Cup game log
October

| Game | Date | Opponent | Score | High points | High rebounds | High assists | Location Attendance | Record | |
|---|---|---|---|---|---|---|---|---|---|
| 1 | October 5 | Talk 'N Text | 110–112* | Reyes (25) | Reyes (14) | Mercado, Ross (7) | Smart Araneta Coliseum | 0–1 | Boxscore |
| 2 | October 10 | Alaska | 93–86 | Hodge (20) | Hodge, Nabong (11) | Mercado (9) | Smart Araneta Coliseum | 1–1 | Boxscore |
| 3 | October 13 | Barangay Ginebra | 95–88 | Cardona (21) | Cardona (8) | Mercado (8) | Digos | 2–1 | Boxscore |
| 4 | October 17 | GlobalPort | 104–105 | Mercado, Buenafe (30) | Hodge (15) | Mercado (8) | Mall of Asia Arena | 2–2 | Boxscore |
| 5 | October 21 | Air21 | 85–72 | Mercado (24) | Reyes (14) | Hugnatan (3) | Mall of Asia Arena | 3–2 | Boxscore |
| 6 | October 31 | Barako Bull | 99–86 | Mercado (22) | Borboran (7) | Mercado (6) | Smart Araneta Coliseum | 4–2 | Boxscore |

November

| Game | Date | Opponent | Score | High points | High rebounds | High assists | Location Attendance | Record | |
|---|---|---|---|---|---|---|---|---|---|
| 7 | November 4 | Rain or Shine | 81–106 | Cardona (20) | Hodge (14) | Cardona (4) | Smart Araneta Coliseum | 4–3 | Boxscore |
| 8 | November 11 | Petron Blaze | 95–81 | Mercado, Hugnatan (22) | Cardona (9) | Cardona (10) | Mall of Asia Arena | 5–3 | Boxscore |
| 9 | November 16 | Talk 'N Text | 98–109 | Mercado (28) | Hugnatan (10) | Mercado, Ross (6) | Ynares Center | 5–4 | Boxscore |
| 10 | November 21 | Rain or Shine | 98–102* | Mercado (28) | Reyes (9) | Mercado (7) | Smart Araneta Coliseum | 5–5 | Boxscore |
| 11 | November 23 | GlobalPort | 101–92 | Cardona (26) | Nabong (11) | Mercado (9) | Smart Araneta Coliseum | 6–5 | Boxscore |
| 12 | November 28 | Alaska | 85–88 | Cardona, Ross (14) | Hodge (9) | Ross (10) | Smart Araneta Coliseum | 6–6 | Boxscore |
| 13 | November 30 | Barako Bull | 85–73 | Nabong (12) | Cardona (8) | Mercado (7) | Smart Araneta Coliseum | 7–6 | Boxscore |

December

| Game | Date | Opponent | Score | High points | High rebounds | High assists | Location Attendance | Record | |
|---|---|---|---|---|---|---|---|---|---|
| 14 | December 9 | San Mig Coffee | 87–77 | Cardona, Hugnatan (15) | Reyes, Hodge, Hugnatan (9) | Mercado (5) | Smart Araneta Coliseum | 8–7 | Boxscore |

2012–13 schedule

=== Playoffs ===
==== Bracket ====
Quarterfinals
(#1 twice-to-beat)
1 | Talk 'N Text | 105
8 | Air21 | 100
(Best-of-3)
4 | Meralco | 0
5 | Alaska | 2
(#2 twice-to-beat)
2 | San Mig Coffee | 92*
7 | Petron Blaze | 87
(Best-of-3)
3 | Rain or Shine | 2
6 | Barangay Ginebra | 1

Semifinals (Best-of-7)
1 | Talk 'N Text | 4
5 | Alaska | 2
2 | San Mig Coffee | 2
3 | Rain or Shine | 4

Finals (Best-of-7)
1 | Talk 'N Text | 4
3 | Rain or Shine | 0

*Game went into overtime

==== Game log ====
2013 PBA Philippine Cup game log
Quarterfinals: 0–2

| Game | Date | Opponent | Score | High points | High rebounds | High assists | Location Attendance | Record | |
|---|---|---|---|---|---|---|---|---|---|
| 1 | December 12 | Alaska | 84–90 | Mercado (22) | Reyes (21) | Mercado (6) | Smart Araneta Coliseum | 0–1 | Boxscore |
| 2 | December 14 | Alaska | 70–88 | Cardona (18) | Hugnatan (9) | Mercado (10) | Smart Araneta Coliseum | 0–2 | Boxscore |

2012–13 schedule

== Commissioner's Cup ==
=== Eliminations ===
==== Standings ====
| Pos | Team | W | L | PCT | GB | Qualification |
|---|---|---|---|---|---|---|
| 1 | Alaska Aces | 11 | 3 | .786 | — | Twice-to-beat in the quarterfinals |
| 2 | Rain or Shine Elasto Painters | 9 | 5 | .643 | 2 | Twice-to-beat in the quarterfinals |
| 3 | Petron Blaze Boosters | 8 | 6 | .571 (Note: Head-to-head record: Petron 2–0 San Mig) | 3 | Best-of-three quarterfinals |
| 4 | San Mig Coffee Mixers | 8 | 6 | .571 | 3 | Best-of-three quarterfinals |
| 5 | Meralco Bolts | 7 | 7 | .500 (Note: Head-to-head quotient: Meralco 1.01, TNT 1.00, Barangay Ginebra 0.99) | 4 | Best-of-three quarterfinals |
| 6 | Talk 'N Text Tropang Texters | 7 | 7 | .500 | 4 | Best-of-three quarterfinals |
| 7 | Barangay Ginebra San Miguel | 7 | 7 | .500 | 4 | Twice-to-win in the quarterfinals |
| 8 | Air21 Express | 6 | 8 | .429 | 5 | Twice-to-win in the quarterfinals |
| 9 | Barako Bull Energy Cola | 5 | 9 | .357 | 6 | |
| 10 | GlobalPort Batang Pier | 2 | 12 | .143 | 9 | |

Source: PBA.ph

==== Game log ====
2013 PBA Commissioner's Cup game log
February

| Game | Date | Opponent | Score | High points | High rebounds | High assists | Location Attendance | Record | |
|---|---|---|---|---|---|---|---|---|---|
| 1 | February 9 | Talk 'N Text | 99–92 | Dawson (37) | Dawson (14) | Ross (8) | Smart Araneta Coliseum | 1–0 | boxscore |
| 2 | February 13 | Alaska | 81–85 | Manuel (18) | Dawson (13) | Artadi (4) | Smart Araneta Coliseum | 1–1 | boxscore |
| 3 | February 16 | Rain or Shine | 82–91 | Dawson (21) | Dawson (12) | Ross (9) | Puerto Princesa City, Palawan | 1–2 | boxscore |
| 4 | February 20 | Petron Blaze | 86–88 | Dawson (24) | Dawson (20) | Ross (6) | Smart Araneta Coliseum | 1–3 | boxscore |
| 5 | February 24 | GlobalPort | 90–89 | Salvacion (20) | Dawson (17) | Ross (17) | Smart Araneta Coliseum | 2–3 | boxscore |

March

| Game | Date | Opponent | Score | High points | High rebounds | High assists | Location Attendance | Record | |
|---|---|---|---|---|---|---|---|---|---|
| 6 | March 6 | Air21 | 89–88 | Dawson (35) | Dawson (17) | Ross (12) | Smart Araneta Coliseum | 3–3 | boxscore |
| 7 | March 13 | Barako Bull | | | | | Smart Araneta Coliseum | | |
| 8 | March 15 | San Mig Coffee | | | | | Smart Araneta Coliseum | | |
| 9 | March 22 | Barangay Ginebra | | | | | Smart Araneta Coliseum | | |

2012–13 schedule

== Governors Cup ==
=== Eliminations ===
==== Standings ====
| Pos | Team | W | L | PCT | GB | Qualification |
|---|---|---|---|---|---|---|
| 1 | Petron Blaze Boosters | 8 | 1 | .889 | — | Twice-to-beat in the quarterfinals |
| 2 | San Mig Coffee Mixers | 6 | 3 | .667 | 2 | Twice-to-beat in the quarterfinals |
| 3 | Meralco Bolts | 5 | 4 | .556 (Note: Head-to-head record: Meralco 1–0 Rain or Shine) | 3 | Twice-to-beat in the quarterfinals |
| 4 | Rain or Shine Elasto Painters | 5 | 4 | .556 | 3 | Twice-to-beat in the quarterfinals |
| 5 | GlobalPort Batang Pier | 4 | 5 | .444 (Note: Head-to-head quotient: GlobalPort 1.01, Barako Bull 1.00, Alaska 0.99) | 4 | Twice-to-win in the quarterfinals |
| 6 | Barako Bull Energy | 4 | 5 | .444 | 4 | Twice-to-win in the quarterfinals |
| 7 | Alaska Aces | 4 | 5 | .444 | 4 | Twice-to-win in the quarterfinals |
| 8 | Barangay Ginebra San Miguel | 3 | 6 | .333 (Note: Head-to-head quotient: Talk 'N Text 1.05, Barangay Ginebra 1.00, Air21 0.96; eighth seed playoff: Barangay Ginebra 110–102 Talk 'N Text) | 5 | Twice-to-win in the quarterfinals |
| 9 | Talk 'N Text Tropang Texters | 3 | 6 | .333 | 5 | |
| 10 | Air21 Express | 3 | 6 | .333 | 5 | |

Source: PBA.ph

== Transactions ==
=== Trades ===
==== Pre-season ====
| August 20, 2012 | To Meralco 2012 2nd round pick (Kelly Nabong) | To Rain or Shine 2015 second round pick |
| September 11, 2012 | To Meralco Carlo Sharma; Sunday Salvacion | To Barako Bull Jason Ballesteros |

==== Commissioner's Cup ====
| January 31, 2013 | To Meralco Rey Guevarra; Vic Manuel; Josh Vanlandingham; 2015 1st round pick | To GlobalPort Sol Mercado; Kelly Nabong; JP Belencion; Yousif Aljamal |

| June 10, 2013 | To Meralco Jared Dillinger; Don Allado | To Barako Bull Ronjay Buenafe; Gilbert Bulawan |

| July 17, 2013 | To Meralco Nonoy Baclao; John Wilson | To Air21 Vic Manuel; Carlo Sharma; 2016 2nd round pick |

==== Governors' Cup ====
| September 7, 2013 | To Meralco Mike Cortez; James Sena | To Air21 Asi Taulava; Mark Borboran |

| October 11, 2013 | To Meralco Gary David; AJ Mandani | To GlobalPort Chris Ross; Chris Timberlake; 2016 and 2017 2nd round picks |

| October 14, 2013 | To Meralco Rabeh Al-Hussaini; Nelbert Omolon | To Air21 Mark Cardona; Nonoy Baclao |

=== Recruited imports ===
| Tournament | Name | Debuted | Last game | Record |
|---|---|---|---|---|
| Commissioner's Cup | Eric Dawson | February 9 (vs. Talk 'N Text) | April 24 (vs. San Mig Coffee) | 8–9 |
| Governors' Cup | Mario West | August 16 (vs. Petron) | October 6 (vs. San Mig Coffee) | 7–7 |
