= James Sena =

Filipino basketball player

No. 31 – Blackwater Bossing
- Position: Power forward
- League: PBA

Personal information
- Born: August 31, 1988 (age 38) Agoo, La Union, Philippines
- Listed height: 6 ft 5 in (1.96 m)
- Listed weight: 225 lb (102 kg)

Career information
- College: JRU
- PBA draft: 2009: 1st round, 9th overall pick
- Drafted by: San Miguel Beermen
- Playing career: 2011–present

Career history
- 2011–2013: Shopinas.com Clickers / Air21 Express
- 2013–2015: Meralco Bolts
- 2015–2019: Blackwater Elite
- 2021–2022: San Miguel Beermen
- 2022–2024: Blackwater Bossing
- 2024: Batangas City Tanduay Rum Masters
- 2024: Manila SV Batang Sampaloc
- 2025: Zamboanga Sikat
- 2026: Iloilo United Royals
- 2026–present: Blackwater Bossing

Career highlights
- PBA All-Rookie Team (2012)

James Ryan R. Sena (born August 31, 1988) is a Filipino professional basketball player for the Blackwater Bossing of the Philippine Basketball Association (PBA). Sena played collegiate basketball at JRU Heavy Bombers.

== PBA career statistics ==
Legend
GP	Games played	MPG	Minutes per game	FG%	Field-goal percentage
3FG%	3-point field-goal percentage	4P%	4-point field-goal percentage	FT%	Free-throw percentage
RPG	Rebounds per game	APG	Assists per game	SPG	Steals per game
BPG	Blocks per game	PPG	Points per game	127	Career high

As of the end of 2023–24 season

=== Season-by-season averages ===
Year	Team	GP	MPG	FG%	3P%	4P%	FT%	RPG	APG	SPG	BPG	PPG
2011–12	Shopinas.com / Air21	32	26.1	.443	.000	—	.719	6.9	1.5	.1	.3	8.3
2012–13	Air21	32	13.9	.443	.000	—	.808	2.5	.6	.1	.1	4.0
2012–13	Meralco	32	13.9	.443	.000	—	.808	2.5	.6	.1	.1	4.0
2013–14	Meralco	21	9.4	.442	—	—	.750	1.9	.4	.1	.1	2.1
2014–15	Meralco	25	8.4	.373	—	—	.667	1.5	.4	—	.1	1.9
2015–16	Blackwater	26	15.9	.474	.286	—	.857	2.7	.8	.3	.2	3.8
2016–17	Blackwater	34	19.9	.458	.200	—	.810	3.5	.9	.4	.1	5.7
2017–18	Blackwater	28	15.0	.397	.278	—	.667	2.9	1.1	.1	.1	4.0
2019	Blackwater	28	12.2	.364	.278	—	.833	1.9	.6	.3	.0	2.5
2021	San Miguel	6	3.2	.250	1.000	—	—	.3	—	—	—	.5
2022–23	Blackwater	29	10.3	.500	.510	—	.500	1.3	.8	.2	.0	4.6
2023–24	Blackwater	9	5.7	.500	.750	—	1.000	1.1	.1	—	—	2.1
2025–26	Blackwater	3	4.8	.500	.500	—	—	.3	—	—	—	1.0
Career		273	14.4	.439	.377	—	.744	2.8	.8	.2	.1	4.1
