= List of NLEX Road Warriors seasons =

The NLEX Road Warriors joined the Philippine Basketball Association (PBA) in 2014 following the acquisition of the second Air21 Express franchise of the Lina Group by Manila North Tollways Corporation (now known as NLEX Corporation). The team began play in the 2014–15 PBA season.

== Records per conference ==
Note: Statistics are correct as of the end of the 2025 PBA Philippine Cup.

Conference champions	Conference runners-up	Conference semifinalists	Playoff berth	Eighth seed playoff

Season	Conference	Elimination round						Playoffs	
Season	Conference	Finish	Played	Wins	Losses	Win %	GB	Round	Results
NLEX Road Warriors
2014–15 (team)	Philippine	10th	11	4	7	.364	5	Quarterfinals 1	lost vs. Alaska, 78–82 (Note: Opposing team had a twice-to-beat advantage.)
2014–15 (team)	Commissioner's	4th	11	6	5	.545	2	Quarterfinals	lost vs. Meralco, 0–2
2014–15 (team)	Governors'	11th	11	3	8	.273	5	Did not qualify	
2015–16 (team)	Philippine	7th	11	5	6	.455	4	Quarterfinals 1	lost vs. TNT, 88–90
2015–16 (team)	Commissioner's	7th	11	5	6	.455	3	Quarterfinals	lost vs. Meralco, 97–104
2015–16 (team)	Governors'	7th	11	5	6	.455	5	Quarterfinals	lost vs. San Miguel, 110–114
2016–17 (team)	Philippine	12th	11	2	9	.182	8	Did not qualify	
2016–17 (team)	Commissioner's	12th	11	2	9	.182	7	Did not qualify	
2016–17 (team)	Governors'	5th	11	7	4	.636	2	Quarterfinals	lost vs. Star, 77–89
2017–18 (team)	Philippine	6th	11	6	5	.545	2	Quarterfinals; Semifinals	won vs. Alaska, 2–0 lost vs. Magnolia, 2–4
2017–18 (team)	Commissioner's	11th	11	2	9	.182	7	Did not qualify	
2017–18 (team)	Governors'	8th	11	5	6	.455	4	Quarterfinals	lost vs. Barangay Ginebra, 75–111
2019 (team)	Philippine	9th	11	4	7	.364	5	Eighth seed playoff	lost vs. Alaska, 80–88
2019 (team)	Commissioner's	12th	11	3	8	.273	7	Did not qualify	
2019 (team)	Governors'	1st	11	8	3	.727	—	Quarterfinals	lost vs. NorthPort in two games (Note: Team had a twice-to-beat advantage.)
2020 (team)	Philippine	9th	11	5	6	.455	3	Did not qualify	
2021 (team)	Philippine	7th	11	5	6	.455	5	Quarterfinals	lost vs. Meralco in two games
2021 (team)	Governors'	2nd	11	8	3	.727	1	Quarterfinals; Semifinals	won vs. Alaska in two games lost vs. Barangay Ginebra, 1–3
2022–23 (team)	Philippine	6th	11	6	5	.545	3	Quarterfinals	lost vs. Magnolia, 2–1
2022–23 (team)	Commissioner's	9th	12	5	7	.417	5	Eighth seed playoff	lost vs. Rain or Shine, 100–110
2022–23 (team)	Governors'	6th	11	7	4	.636	3	Quarterfinals	lost vs. Barangay Ginebra, 93–127
2023–24 (team)	Commissioner's	9th	11	4	7	.364	5	Did not qualify	
2023–24 (team)	Philippine	6th	11	6	5	.545	4	Quarterfinals	lost vs. Meralco, 0–2
2024–25 (team)	Governors'	4th (Group B)	10	5	5	.500	2	Quarterfinals	lost vs. TNT, 1–3
2024–25 (team)	Commissioner's	9th	12	6	6	.500	3	Eighth seed playoff	lost vs. Magnolia, 81–112
2024–25 (team)	Philippine	2nd	11	8	3	.727	—	Quarterfinals	lost vs. Rain or Shine in two games
Elimination round record			287	132	155	.460		19 playoff appearances	
Playoff record			41	9	32	.220		0 finals appearances	
Cumulative record			328	141	187	.430		0 championships	

== Records per season ==
Note: Statistics are correct as of the end of the 2025 PBA Philippine Cup.

Season	Stage	Played	Wins	Losses	Win %	Best finish
2014–15 (team)	Elimination round	33	13	20	.394	Quarterfinals
2014–15 (team)	Playoffs	3	0	3	.000	Quarterfinals
2014–15 (team)	Overall	36	13	23	.361	Quarterfinals
2015–16 (team)	Elimination round	33	15	18	.455	Quarterfinals
2015–16 (team)	Playoffs	3	0	3	.000	Quarterfinals
2015–16 (team)	Overall	36	15	21	.417	Quarterfinals
2016–17 (team)	Elimination round	33	11	22	.333	Quarterfinals
2016–17 (team)	Playoffs	1	0	1	.000	Quarterfinals
2016–17 (team)	Overall	34	11	23	.324	Quarterfinals
2017–18 (team)	Elimination round	33	13	20	.394	Semifinals
2017–18 (team)	Playoffs	9	4	5	.444	Semifinals
2017–18 (team)	Overall	42	17	25	.405	Semifinals
2019 (team)	Elimination round	33	15	18	.455	Quarterfinals
2019 (team)	Playoffs	3	0	3	.000	Quarterfinals
2019 (team)	Overall	36	15	21	.417	Quarterfinals
2020 (team)	Elimination round	11	5	6	.455	Elimination round (9th place)
2020 (team)	Playoffs	Did not qualify				Elimination round (9th place)
2020 (team)	Overall	11	5	6	.455	Elimination round (9th place)
2021 (team)	Elimination round	22	13	9	.591	Semifinals
2021 (team)	Playoffs	8	3	5	.375	Semifinals
2021 (team)	Overall	30	16	14	.533	Semifinals
2022–23 (team)	Elimination round	34	18	16	.529	Quarterfinals
2022–23 (team)	Playoffs	5	1	4	.200	Quarterfinals
2022–23 (team)	Overall	39	19	20	.487	Quarterfinals
2023–24 (team)	Elimination round	22	10	12	.455	Quarterfinals
2023–24 (team)	Playoffs	2	0	2	.000	Quarterfinals
2023–24 (team)	Overall	24	10	14	.417	Quarterfinals
2024–25 (team)	Elimination round	33	19	14	.576	Quarterfinals
2024–25 (team)	Playoffs	7	1	6	.143	Quarterfinals
2024–25 (team)	Overall	40	20	20	.500	Quarterfinals
