= 2008 McDonald's All-American Boys Game =

American high school basketball game

East	West
107	102
	1st half	2nd half	Total
East	54	53	107
West	48	54	102
- Date: March 26, 2008
- Venue: Bradley Center, Milwaukee, Wisconsin
- MVP: Tyreke Evans
- Referees: Thad Hilliard; Steve Johnson; Paul Szelc
- Attendance: 10,914
- Network: ESPN

McDonald's All-American

The 2008 McDonald's All-American Boys Game was an All-star basketball game played on Wednesday, March 26, 2008, at the Bradley Center in Milwaukee, Wisconsin, home of the NBA's Milwaukee Bucks. The game's rosters featured the best and most highly recruited high school boys graduating in 2008. The game was the 31st annual version of the McDonald's All-American Game first played in 1978.

The 48 players were selected from 2,500 nominees by a committee of basketball experts. They were chosen not only for their on-court skills, but for their performances off the court as well. Coach Morgan Wootten, who had more than 1,200 wins as head basketball coach at DeMatha High School, was chairman of the selection committee. Legendary UCLA coach John Wooden, who has been involved in the McDonald's All American Games since its inception, served as chairman of the Games and as an advisor to the selection committee.

Proceeds from the 2008 McDonald's All American High School Basketball Games went to Ronald McDonald House Charities (RMHC) of Eastern Wisconsin and its Ronald McDonald House program.

== 2008 Game ==
The game was telecast live by ESPN. Nearly 11,000 fans filled the Bradley Center and witnessed a closely contested 107–102 victory by the visiting East Team. The victory widened the East's lead in the overall series to 17–14 and stopped a two-game winning streak by the West Team.

The John R. Wooden MVP Award was given to Tyreke Evans (Memphis), as he led the East squad in both points (21) and rebounds (10). Mike Rosario (Rutgers) contributed 18 points and five steals. That steal total earned Rasario a tie for fifth place all-time in the record books.

Willie Warren (Oklahoma) led the West Team with 23 points on 65% shooting from the field. Brandon Jennings had a solid game with 12 points, five rebounds and nine assists, which placed him in the 10th spot all-time. Both teams featured a balanced attack where twelve players total scored in double figures (Brandon Jennings, Jrue Holiday, DeMar DeRozan, B.J. Mullens, Willie Warren and Anthony Smith for the West) and (Tyreke Evans, Kemba Walker, Mike Rosario, Elliot Williams, Ed Davis and JaMychal Green for the East). The West Team also featured this year's Morgan Wootten Player of the Year and the Naismith Sportsmanship Award winners, Greg Monroe (Georgetown) and Luke Babbitt (Nevada) respectively.

This game looked to be a great match-up from the tip. The teams traded buckets and had three ties and four lead changes within the first three minutes of the game. However, the East Team grabbed the lead at 8–6 and kept it the remainder of the game. The West Squad fought hard to keep the lead to single digits and had it down to a two-point game late in the second period, but they couldn't overcome a 14 rebound deficit and 52% shooting from the East Team.

=== East Roster ===
#	Name	Height	Weight	Position	Hometown	High school	College choice
1	Tyreke Evans	6–5	217	G	Aston, Pennsylvania	American Christian Academy	Memphis
3	Mike Rosario	6–3	180	G	Jersey City, New Jersey	St Anthony High School	Rutgers^{[1]}
15	Kemba Walker	6–0	180	G	Bronx, New York	Rice High School	Connecticut
24	Sylven Landesberg	6-6	205	G	Flushing, New York	Holy Cross High School	Virginia
25	Elliot Williams	6–4	175	G	Memphis, Tennessee	St. George's Independent School	Duke
31	Chris Singleton	6–9	225	F	Dunwoody, Georgia	Dunwoody High School	Florida State
32	Ed Davis	6–9	215	F	Richmond, Virginia	Benedictine High School	North Carolina
40	Tyler Zeller	6–11	220	C	Washington, Indiana	Washington High School	North Carolina
42	Al-Farouq Aminu	6–9	215	F	Norcross, Georgia	Norcross High School	Wake Forest
44	William Buford	6–4	180	G	Toledo, Ohio	Libbey High School	Ohio State
50	JaMychal Green	6–9	230	F	Montgomery, Alabama	St. Jude Educational Institute	Alabama
55	Samardo Samuels	6–9	250	C	Trelawny Parish, Jamaica	Saint Benedict's Preparatory School	Louisville

=== West Roster ===
#	Name	Height	Weight	Position	Hometown	High school	College choice
1	Iman Shumpert	6–3	200	G	Oak Park, Illinois	Oak Park and River Forest High School	Georgia Tech
3	Brandon Jennings	6–2	170	G	Los Angeles, California	Oak Hill Academy	None^{[2]}
5	Luke Babbitt	6–9	225	F	Reno, Nevada	Galena High School	Nevada
10	Greg Monroe	6–10	235	C	Harvey, Louisiana	Helen Cox High School	Georgetown
11	Malcolm Lee	6–5	190	G	Riverside, California	John W. North High School	UCLA
12	Willie Warren	6–5	200	G	Fort Worth, Texas	North Crowley High School	Oklahoma
21	Jrue Holiday	6–4	195	G	North Hollywood, California	Campbell Hall School	UCLA
22	Larry Drew II.	6–1	170	G	Los Angeles, California	Taft High School	North Carolina
24	DeMar DeRozan	6-6	210	F	Compton, California	Compton High School	USC
25	Scotty Hopson	6–5	180	G	Hopkinsville, Kentucky	University Heights Academy	Tennessee
32	B. J. Mullens	7–1	260	C	Canal Winchester, Ohio	Canal Winchester High School	Ohio State
33	Michael Dunigan	6–10	250	C	Chicago, Illinois	Farragut Career Academy	Oregon

- ^{1} Rosario left Rutgers after his sophomore season of 2009–10 and transferred to Florida. He completed his eligibility at Florida in 2013.
- ^{2} Opted to accept a contract in Rome, Italy instead of attending a US university.

=== Coaches ===
The East team was coached by:

- Head Coach Woodie Jackson of Francis Marion High School (Marion, Alabama)
- Asst Coach Anthony Trimble of Francis Marion High School (Marion, Alabama)
- Asst Coach Albert Turner Jr. of Francis Marion High School (Marion, Alabama)

The West team was coached by:

- Co-Head Coach Tom Diener of Harold S. Vincent High School (Milwaukee, Wisconsin)
- Co-Head Coach Jim Gosz of Rufus King High School (Milwaukee, Wisconsin)
- Asst Coach Marc Mitchell of Custer High School (Milwaukee, Wisconsin)

=== Boxscore ===
==== Visitors: East ====
##	Player	FGM/A	3PM/A	FTM/A	Points	Off Reb	Def Reb	Tot Reb	PF	Ast	TO	BS	ST	Min
1	*Tyreke Evans	9/15	1/ 4	2/ 3	21	2	8	10	3	4	5	0	1	23:51
15	*Kemba Walker	6/ 9	1/ 2	0/ 1	13	3	3	6	0	3	3	0	1	22:59
40	*Tyler Zeller	3/ 4	0/ 0	0/ 0	6	1	1	2	1	0	0	0	0	12:41
42	*Al-Farouq Aminu	0/ 4	0/ 1	0/ 0	0	0	4	4	0	0	1	0	1	12:39
55	*Samardo Samuels	3/ 8	0/ 0	2/ 2	8	2	3	5	1	1	2	0	1	19:05
3	Mike Rosario	8/13	1/ 4	1/ 2	18	0	0	0	3	0	3	0	5	19:20
24	Sylven Landesberg	1/ 5	0/ 0	0/ 0	2	1	1	2	0	0	4	0	0	12:42
25	Elliot Williams	4/ 8	0/ 1	2/ 2	10	2	0	2	0	1	2	0	0	13:56
31	Chris Singleton	0/ 1	0/ 1	0/ 0	0	1	6	7	3	0	2	0	0	13:37
32	Ed Davis	5/ 7	0/ 0	1/ 4	11	3	3	6	1	0	0	0	1	13:46
44	William Buford	3/ 9	0/ 3	0/ 0	6	0	1	1	2	1	0	0	1	20:57
50	JaMychal Green	5/ 7	0/ 0	2/ 3	12	3	2	5	1	2	0	0	0	14:15
	Team					1	2	3			3			
	TOTALS	47/90	3/16	10/17	107	19	34	53	15	12	25	0	11	199:48

==== Home: West ====
##	Player	FGM/A	3PM/A	FTM/A	Points	Off Reb	Def Reb	Tot Reb	PF	Ast	TO	BS	ST	Min
3	*Brandon Jennings	5/12	2/ 8	0/ 0	12	0	5	5	2	9	6	0	1	23:01
10	*Greg Monroe	0/ 2	0/ 1	1/ 2	1	1	5	6	1	0	5	2	2	20:07
21	*Jrue Holiday	6/ 9	0/ 2	2/ 2	14	4	1	5	2	3	2	0	5	22:10
24	*DeMar DeRozan	5/10	0/ 1	0/ 1	10	0	1	1	2	0	2	0	0	17:01
32	*B.J. Mullens	5/ 6	0/ 0	2/ 4	12	1	2	3	0	0	1	0	1	12:54
1	Iman Shumpert	0/ 1	0/ 1	0/ 0	0	0	5	5	1	1	0	0	0	12:40
5	Luke Babbitt	1/ 5	0/ 1	2/ 3	4	0	2	2	1	1	1	1	0	15:32
11	Malcolm Lee	1/ 3	0/ 0	1/ 2	3	2	0	2	3	0	2	0	1	13:54
12	Willie Warren	11/17	1/ 5	0/ 1	23	1	1	2	2	2	2	0	3	21:54
22	Larry Drew II	3/ 8	1/ 5	0/ 0	7	0	2	2	2	5	1	2	1	15:32
25	Scotty Hopson	4/ 5	0/ 1	2/ 4	10	0	2	2	0	3	0	0	1	14:43
33	Michael Dunigan	3/ 3	0/ 0	0/ 0	6	0	2	2	1	0	0	1	0	12:32
	Team					1	1	2			1			
	TOTALS	44/81	4/25	10/19	102	10	29	39	17	24	23	6	15	200:00

(* = Starting Line-up)

== All-American Week ==
=== Schedule ===
- Tuesday, March 25: Powerade Jamfest
  - Slam Dunk Contest
  - Three-Point Shoot-out
  - Timed Basketball Skills Competition
- Wednesday, March 26: 31st Annual Boys All-American Game

The Powerade JamFest is a skills-competition evening featuring basketball players who demonstrate their skills in three crowd-entertaining ways. The slam dunk contest was first held in 1987, and a 3-point shooting challenge was added in 1989. This year, for the first time, a timed basketball skills competition was added to the schedule of events.

=== Contest Winners ===
- The 2008 Powerade Slam Dunk contest was won by DeMar DeRozan.
- Larry Drew II was winner of the 2008 3-point shoot-out.
- The skills competition was won by Jrue Holiday.

== See also ==
- 2008 McDonald's All-American Girls Game
