= 2015–16 NLEX Road Warriors season =

- Head coach: Boyet Fernandez
- Owners: Metro Pacific Investments Corporation (an MVP Group subsidiary)

Philippine Cup results
- Record: 5–6 (45.5%)
- Place: 7th
- Playoff finish: Quarterfinalist (lost to TNT in one game with twice-to-win disadvantage in Phase 1)

Commissioner's Cup results
- Record: 5–6 (45.5%)
- Place: 7th
- Playoff finish: Quarterfinalist (lost to Meralco in one game with twice-to-win disadvantage)

Governors' Cup results
- Record: 5–6 (45.5%)
- Place: 7th
- Playoff finish: Quarterfinalist (lost to San Miguel in one game with twice-to-win disadvantage)

NLEX Road Warriors seasons

The 2015–16 NLEX Road Warriors season was the 2nd season of the franchise in the Philippine Basketball Association (PBA).

== Key dates ==
- August 23: The 2015 PBA draft took place in Midtown Atrium, Robinson Place Manila.

== Draft picks ==
Round	Pick	Player	Position	Nationality	PBA D-League team	College
1	6	Garvo Lanete	SG	Philippines	Hapee Fresh Fighters	San Beda
1	10	Glenn Khobuntin	SF	Philippines	Jumbo Plastic Linoleum Giants	NU
3	25	Jansen Rios	SF	Philippines	LiverMarin Guardians	Adamson
4	36	Jerramy King	SG	United States	AMA Titans (D-League)	Cal State Long Beach
5	45	Alfred Batino	C	Philippines	Café France Bakers	CEU
6	50	Edgar Tanuan, Jr.	SF	Philippines	none	FEU
7	53	Arvin Vitug	PG	Philippines	EA Regen Meds	SSC-R

== Roster ==
2015–16 NLEX Road Warriors roster
Players
Coaches

Pos.	#	POB	Name	Height	Weight	DOB (YYYY–MM–DD)	From
G	1	(Philippines)	Emman Monfort	5 ft 7 in (1.70 m)	132 lb (60 kg)	1989–07–02	Ateneo
G	3	(Philippines)	Mark Cardona (IN)	6 ft 1 in (1.85 m)	180 lb (82 kg)	1981–11–13	De La Salle
G	6	(Philippines)	Kevin Alas	6 ft 0 in (1.83 m)	175 lb (79 kg)	1991–11–13	Letran
F	9	(Philippines)	Harold Arboleda	6 ft 2 in (1.88 m)	180 lb (82 kg)	1990–09–05	UPHSD
F	10	(Canada)	Sean Anthony	6 ft 4 in (1.93 m)	200 lb (91 kg)	1986–01–26	McGill
G	11	(Philippines)	Jonas Villanueva	6 ft 0 in (1.83 m)	170 lb (77 kg)	1983–03–31	Far Eastern
F	12	(Philippines)	Eric Camson	6 ft 4 in (1.93 m)	228 lb (103 kg)	1990–05–12	Adamson
G	13	(Philippines)	Garvo Lanete	6 ft 2 in (1.88 m)	180 lb (82 kg)	1989–02–13	San Beda
F/C	14	(Philippines)	Enrico Villanueva	6 ft 5 in (1.96 m)	210 lb (95 kg)	1980–06–23	Ateneo
C	16	(Philippines)	Raul Soyud	6 ft 5 in (1.96 m)	220 lb (100 kg)	1991–01–14	Philippines
G/F	23	(Canada)	James Forrester	6 ft 2 in (1.88 m)	190 lb (86 kg)	1989–09–03	Arellano
F	24	(Philippines)	Glenn Khobuntin	6 ft 4 in (1.93 m)	195 lb (88 kg)	1991–09–07	National-U
F/C	42	(United States)	Robert Reyes	6 ft 6 in (1.98 m)	220 lb (100 kg)	1983–03–16	Flagler
F	45	(Philippines)	Marnel Baracael	6 ft 3 in (1.91 m)	205 lb (93 kg)	1985–04–14	Far Eastern
C	88	(Tonga)	Asi Taulava (C)	6 ft 8 in (2.03 m)	245 lb (111 kg)	1973–03–02	BYU–Hawaii
F	–	(Philippines)	Jeckster Apinan	6 ft 4 in (1.93 m)	181 lb (82 kg)	1987–01–09	José Rizal

Head coach

- (Philippines) Boyet Fernandez

Assistant coach(es)

- (Philippines) Adonis Tierra (1st Assistant)
- (Philippines) Jojo Lastimosa
- (Philippines) Sandy Arespacochaga
- (Philippines) Raymond Celis
- (Philippines) Claiford Arao
- (Philippines) Gino Manuel
- (Philippines) Jaime Serrano

Team manager

- (Philippines) Ronald Dulatre

Legend

- (C) Team captain
- (CI) Commissioner's Cup Import
- (GI) Governors' Cup Import
- (EI) EASL Import
- (DP) Unsigned draft pick
- (FA) Free agent
- (IN) Inactive
- (S) Suspended
- (R) Rookie
- Injured

Roster

== Philippine Cup ==
=== Eliminations ===
==== Standings ====
Pos	Team	W	L	PCT	GB	Qualification
1	Alaska Aces	9	2	.818 (Note: Head-to-head record: Alaska 1–0 San Miguel)	—	Advance to semifinals
2	San Miguel Beermen	9	2	.818	—	Advance to semifinals
3	Rain or Shine Elasto Painters	8	3	.727	1	Twice-to-beat in the quarterfinals
4	Barangay Ginebra San Miguel	7	4	.636 (Note: Head-to-head record: Barangay Ginebra 1–0 GlobalPort)	2	Twice-to-beat in the quarterfinals
5	GlobalPort Batang Pier	7	4	.636	2	Twice-to-beat in the quarterfinals
6	TNT Tropang Texters	6	5	.545	3	Twice-to-beat in the quarterfinals
7	NLEX Road Warriors	5	6	.455 (Note: Head-to-head record: NLEX 1–0 Barako Bull)	4	Twice-to-win in the quarterfinals
8	Barako Bull Energy	5	6	.455	4	Twice-to-win in the quarterfinals
9	Star Hotshots	4	7	.364	5	Twice-to-win in the quarterfinals
10	Blackwater Elite	3	8	.273	6	Twice-to-win in the quarterfinals
11	Mahindra Enforcer	2	9	.182	7	
12	Meralco Bolts	1	10	.091	8	

Source: PBA.ph

=== Playoffs ===
==== Bracket ====
Quarterfinals (1st phase) (Higher seeds twice-to-beat)
3	Rain or Shine	95
10	Blackwater	90
6	TNT	90
7	NLEX	88
4	Barangay Ginebra	92*
9	Star	89
5	GlobalPort	94
8	Barako Bull	85

Quarterfinals (2nd phase) (Single elimination)
3	Rain or Shine	104
6	TNT	89
4	Barangay Ginebra	83
5	GlobalPort	84*

Semifinals (Best-of-7)
2	San Miguel	4
3	Rain or Shine	2
1	Alaska	4
5	GlobalPort	1

Finals (Best-of-7)
2	San Miguel	4
1	Alaska	3

*Game went into overtime

== Commissioner's Cup ==
=== Eliminations ===
==== Standings ====
Pos	Team	W	L	PCT	GB	Qualification
1	San Miguel Beermen	8	3	.727 (Note: Head-to-head record: San Miguel 1–0 Meralco)	—	Twice-to-beat in the quarterfinals
2	Meralco Bolts	8	3	.727	—	Twice-to-beat in the quarterfinals
3	Alaska Aces	7	4	.636 (Note: Head-to-head quotient: Alaska 1.18, Barangay Ginebra 1.03, Rain or Shine 0.84)	1	Best-of-three quarterfinals
4	Barangay Ginebra San Miguel	7	4	.636	1	Best-of-three quarterfinals
5	Rain or Shine Elasto Painters	7	4	.636	1	Best-of-three quarterfinals
6	Tropang TNT	6	5	.545	2	Best-of-three quarterfinals
7	NLEX Road Warriors	5	6	.455 (Note: Head-to-head record: NLEX 1–0 Star)	3	Twice-to-win in the quarterfinals
8	Star Hotshots	5	6	.455	3	Twice-to-win in the quarterfinals
9	Mahindra Enforcer	4	7	.364	4	
10	Blackwater Elite	3	8	.273 (Note: Head-to-head quotient: Blackwater 1.04, Phoenix 0.99, GlobalPort 0.98)	5	
11	Phoenix Fuel Masters	3	8	.273	5	
12	GlobalPort Batang Pier	3	8	.273	5	

Source: PBA.ph

=== Playoffs ===
==== Bracket ====
Quarterfinals
(#1 twice-to-beat)
1	San Miguel	99	103
8	Star	108	99
(Best-of-3)
4	Barangay Ginebra	0
5	Rain or Shine	2
(#2 twice-to-beat)
2	Meralco	104
7	NLEX	97
(Best-of-3)
3	Alaska	2
6	TNT	1

Semifinals (Best-of-5)
1	San Miguel	1
5	Rain or Shine	3
2	Meralco	2
3	Alaska	3

Finals (Best-of-7)
5	Rain or Shine	4
3	Alaska	2

== Governors' Cup ==
=== Eliminations ===
==== Standings ====
Pos	Team	W	L	PCT	GB	Qualification
1	TNT KaTropa	10	1	.909	—	Twice-to-beat in the quarterfinals
2	San Miguel Beermen	8	3	.727 (Note: Head-to-head record: San Miguel 1–0 Barangay Ginebra)	2	Twice-to-beat in the quarterfinals
3	Barangay Ginebra San Miguel	8	3	.727	2	Twice-to-beat in the quarterfinals
4	Meralco Bolts	6	5	.545 (Note: Head-to-head quotient: Meralco 1.039, Mahindra 1.017, Alaska 0.950; fourth seed playoff: Meralco 104–99 Mahindra)	4	Twice-to-beat in the quarterfinals
5	Mahindra Enforcer	6	5	.545	4	Twice-to-win in the quarterfinals
6	Alaska Aces	6	5	.545	4	Twice-to-win in the quarterfinals
7	NLEX Road Warriors	5	6	.455 (Note: Head-to-head quotient: NLEX 1.04, Rain or Shine 1.03, Phoenix 0.93; eighth seed playoff: Phoenix 105–94 Rain or Shine)	5	Twice-to-win in the quarterfinals
8	Phoenix Fuel Masters	5	6	.455	5	Twice-to-win in the quarterfinals
9	Rain or Shine Elasto Painters	5	6	.455	5	
10	GlobalPort Batang Pier	4	7	.364	6	
11	Star Hotshots	2	9	.182	8	
12	Blackwater Elite	1	10	.091	9	

Source: PBA.ph

==== Bracket ====
Quarterfinals (Top 4 twice-to-beat)
1	TNT	136
8	Phoenix	124
4	Meralco	105
5	Mahindra	82
2	San Miguel	114
7	NLEX	110
3	Barangay Ginebra	109
6	Alaska	104

Semifinals (Best-of-5)
1	TNT	1
4	Meralco	3
2	San Miguel	2
3	Barangay Ginebra	3

Finals (Best-of-7)
4	Meralco	2
3	Barangay Ginebra	4

== Transactions ==
=== Trades ===
Off-season

August 25, 2015	To Mahindra Niño Canaleta and Aldrech Ramos (from NLEX); Robert Reyes (from Talk 'n Text)	To NLEX Kevin Alas (from Talk 'n Text via Mahindra)	To Talk 'N Text Troy Rosario

August 27, 2015	To NLEX Rights to Simon Enciso	To Rain or Shine 2018 second round pick

October 7, 2015	To Mahindra Juneric Baloria; 2016 and 2017 second round picks (from NLEX)	To Meralco 2016 and 2017 second round picks (from Mahindra)	To NLEX Sean Anthony (from Meralco via Mahindra)

=== Recruited imports ===
Tournament	Name	Debuted	Last game	Record
Commissioner's Cup	Al Thornton	February 12 (vs. Ginebra)	April 18 (vs. Meralco)	5–7
Governors' Cup	(United States) Henry Walker	July 16 (vs. Blackwater)	September 23 (vs. San Miguel)	5–7
Governors' Cup	(Lebanon) Rodrigue Akl*	July 16 (vs. Blackwater)	September 23 (vs. San Miguel)	5–7
