= 2014–15 NLEX Road Warriors season =

- Head coach: Boyet Fernandez
- Owners: Metro Pacific Investments Corporation (an MVP Group subsidiary)

Philippine Cup results
- Record: 4–7 (36.4%)
- Place: 10th
- Playoff finish: Quarterfinalist (lost to Alaska in one game with twice-to-win disadvantage)

Commissioner's Cup results
- Record: 6–5 (54.5%)
- Place: 4th
- Playoff finish: Quarterfinalist (lost to Meralco Bolts in two games)

Governors' Cup results
- Record: 3–8 (27.3%)
- Place: 11th
- Playoff finish: Did not qualify

NLEX Road Warriors seasons

The 2014–15 NLEX Road Warriors season was the 1st season of the franchise (after buying Air21) in the Philippine Basketball Association (PBA).

== Key dates ==
- August 24: The 2014 PBA Draft took place in Midtown Atrium, Robinson Place Manila.

== Draft picks ==
Round	Pick	Player	Position	Nationality	PBA D-League team	College
1	4	Matt Ganuelas-Rosser	SF / SG	Philippines	NLEX (D-League)	CSPU

== Roster ==
2014–15 NLEX Road Warriors roster
Players
Coaches

Pos.	#	POB	Name	Height	Weight	DOB (YYYY–MM–DD)	From
G	3	(Philippines)	Mark Cardona	6 ft 1 in (1.85 m)	180 lb (82 kg)	1981-11-13	De La Salle
G/F	4	(Philippines)	John Wilson	6 ft 3 in (1.91 m)	185 lb (84 kg)	1987-01-18	José Rizal
G	8	(Philippines)	John Raymundo	5 ft 11 in (1.80 m)	170 lb (77 kg)	1989-05-30	San Sebastian
F	9	(Philippines)	Niño Canaleta	6 ft 5 in (1.96 m)	200 lb (91 kg)	1982-02-12	UE
G	10	(Philippines)	Rudy Lingganay	5 ft 10 in (1.78 m)	170 lb (77 kg)	1986-08-15	UE
G	11	(Philippines)	Jonas Villanueva	6 ft 1 in (1.85 m)	170 lb (77 kg)	1983-03-31	Far Eastern
F	13	(Philippines)	Eric Camson	6 ft 4 in (1.93 m)	228 lb (103 kg)	1990-06-12	Adamson
F/C	14	(Philippines)	Enrico Villanueva	6 ft 6 in (1.98 m)	210 lb (95 kg)	1980-06-23	Ateneo
F	16	(Philippines)	Mark Borboran	6 ft 5 in (1.96 m)	185 lb (84 kg)	1981-11-20	UE
F/C	17	(Philippines)	Aldrech Ramos	6 ft 6 in (1.98 m)	190 lb (86 kg)	1988-04-03	Far Eastern
F	18	(Philippines)	Jeckster Apinan (R)	6 ft 6 in (1.98 m)	190 lb (86 kg)	1987-01-09	José Rizal
G	19	(Philippines)	Wynne Arboleda	6 ft 0 in (1.83 m)	180 lb (82 kg)	1976-11-28	MLQU
G	23	(Philippines)	Juneric Baloria (R/IN)	6 ft 0 in (1.83 m)	165 lb (75 kg)	1990-07-03	UPHSD
F	26	(Philippines)	Harold Arboleda (R)	6 ft 3 in (1.91 m)	180 lb (82 kg)	1990-09-05	UPHSD
C	88	(Tonga)	Asi Taulava (C)	6 ft 10 in (2.08 m)	245 lb (111 kg)	1973-03-02	BYU–Hawaii

Head coach

- (Philippines) Boyet Fernandez (CSA–Bacolod)

Assistant coach(es)

- (Philippines) Adonis Tierra
- (Philippines) Jojo Lastimosa (Ateneo)
- (Philippines) Sandy Arespacochaga (Ateneo)
- (Philippines) Mon Celis
- (Philippines) Ford Arao (Ateneo)
- (Philippines) Gino Manuel
- (Philippines) Jay Serrano

Team manager

- (Philippines) Ronald Dulatre

Legend

- (C) Team captain
- (CI) Commissioner's Cup Import
- (GI) Governors' Cup Import
- (EI) EASL Import
- (DP) Unsigned draft pick
- (FA) Free agent
- (IN) Inactive
- (S) Suspended
- (R) Rookie
- Injured

== Philippine Cup ==
=== Eliminations ===
==== Standings ====
Pos	Team	W	L	PCT	GB	Qualification
1	San Miguel Beermen	9	2	.818 (Note: Head-to-head record: San Miguel 1–0 Rain or Shine)	—	Advance to semifinals
2	Rain or Shine Elasto Painters	9	2	.818	—	Advance to semifinals
3	Alaska Aces	8	3	.727 (Note: Head-to-head record: Alaska 1–0 Talk 'N Text)	1	Twice-to-beat in the quarterfinals
4	Talk 'N Text Tropang Texters	8	3	.727	1	Twice-to-beat in the quarterfinals
5	Barangay Ginebra San Miguel	6	5	.545 (Note: Head-to-head quotient: Barangay Ginebra 1.07, Meralco 1.06, Purefoods Star 0.89)	3	Twice-to-beat in the quarterfinals
6	Meralco Bolts	6	5	.545	3	Twice-to-beat in the quarterfinals
7	Purefoods Star Hotshots	6	5	.545	3	Twice-to-win in the quarterfinals
8	GlobalPort Batang Pier	5	6	.455	4	Twice-to-win in the quarterfinals
9	Barako Bull Energy	4	7	.364 (Note: Head-to-head record: Barako Bull 1–0 NLEX)	5	Twice-to-win in the quarterfinals
10	NLEX Road Warriors	4	7	.364	5	Twice-to-win in the quarterfinals
11	Kia Sorento	1	10	.091	8	
12	Blackwater Elite	0	11	.000	9	

Source: PBA.ph

=== Playoffs ===
==== Bracket ====
Quarterfinals (1st phase) (Higher seeds twice-to-beat)
3	Alaska	82
10	NLEX	78
6	Meralco	77
7	Purefoods Star	65
4	Talk 'N Text	105
9	Barako Bull	76
5	Barangay Ginebra	95
8	GlobalPort	78

Quarterfinals (2nd phase) (Single elimination)
3	Alaska	87
6	Meralco	69
4	Talk N Text	83
5	Barangay Ginebra	67

Semifinals (Best-of-7)
2	Rain or Shine	2
3	Alaska	4
1	San Miguel	4
4	Talk N' Text	0

Finals (Best-of-7)
3	Alaska	3
1	San Miguel	4

== Commissioner's Cup ==
=== Eliminations ===
==== Standings ====
Pos	Team	W	L	PCT	GB	Qualification
1	Rain or Shine Elasto Painters	8	3	.727 (Note: Head-to-head quotient: Rain or Shine 1.025, Talk 'N Text 1.010, Purefoods 0.969)	—	Twice-to-beat in the quarterfinals
2	Talk 'N Text Tropang Texters	8	3	.727	—	Twice-to-beat in the quarterfinals
3	Purefoods Star Hotshots	8	3	.727	—	Best-of-three quarterfinals
4	NLEX Road Warriors	6	5	.545 (Note: Head-to-head record: NLEX 1–0 Meralco)	2	Best-of-three quarterfinals
5	Meralco Bolts	6	5	.545	2	Best-of-three quarterfinals
6	Alaska Aces	5	6	.455 (Note: Head-to-head quotient: Alaska 1.021, Barako Bull 1.019, Barangay Ginebra 0.960)	3	Best-of-three quarterfinals
7	Barako Bull Energy	5	6	.455	3	Twice-to-win in the quarterfinals
8	Barangay Ginebra San Miguel	5	6	.455	3	Twice-to-win in the quarterfinals
9	San Miguel Beermen	4	7	.364 (Note: Head-to-head quotient: San Miguel 1.011, GlobalPort 0.995, Kia 0.994)	4	
10	GlobalPort Batang Pier	4	7	.364	4	
11	Kia Carnival	4	7	.364	4	
12	Blackwater Elite	3	8	.273	5	

Source: PBA.ph

=== Playoffs ===
==== Bracket ====
Quarterfinals
(#1 twice-to-beat)
1	Rain or Shine	92
8	Barangay Ginebra	91
(Best-of-3)
4	NLEX	0
5	Meralco	2
(#2 twice-to-beat)
2	Talk 'N Text	127
7	Barako Bull	97
(Best-of-3)
3	Purefoods Star	2
6	Alaska	0

Semifinals (Best-of-5)
1	Rain or Shine	3
5	Meralco	0
2	Talk 'N Text	3
3	Purefoods Star	1

Finals (Best-of-7)
1	Rain or Shine	3
2	Talk 'N Text	4

== Governors' Cup ==
=== Eliminations ===
==== Standings ====
Pos	Team	W	L	PCT	GB	Qualification
1	Alaska Aces	8	3	.727 (Note: Head-to-head record: Alaska 1–0 San Miguel)	—	Twice-to-beat in the quarterfinals
2	San Miguel Beermen	8	3	.727	—	Twice-to-beat in the quarterfinals
3	Rain or Shine Elasto Painters	7	4	.636 (Note: Head-to-head record: Rain or Shine 1–0 GlobalPort)	1	Twice-to-beat in the quarterfinals
4	GlobalPort Batang Pier	7	4	.636	1	Twice-to-beat in the quarterfinals
5	Star Hotshots	6	5	.545 (Note: Head-to-head record: Barako Bull 1–0 Star)	2	Twice-to-win in the quarterfinals
6	Barako Bull Energy	6	5	.545	2	Twice-to-win in the quarterfinals
7	Meralco Bolts	5	6	.455 (Note: Head-to-head quotient: Meralco 1.13, Barangay Ginebra 1.00, Kia 0.95, Talk 'N Text 0.93)	3	Twice-to-win in the quarterfinals
8	Barangay Ginebra San Miguel	5	6	.455	3	Twice-to-win in the quarterfinals
9	Kia Carnival	5	6	.455	3	
10	Talk 'N Text Tropang Texters	5	6	.455	3	
11	NLEX Road Warriors	3	8	.273	5	
12	Blackwater Elite	1	10	.091	7	

Source: PBA.ph

==== Bracket ====
Quarterfinals (Top 4 twice-to-beat)
1	Alaska	114
8	Ginebra	108
4	GlobalPort	73	94
5	Star	126	101
2	San Miguel	99	102
7	Meralco	106	86
3	Rain or Shine	134**
6	Barako Bull	132

Semifinals (Best-of-5)
1	Alaska	3
5	Star	0
2	San Miguel	3
3	Rain or Shine	1

Finals (Best-of-7)
1	Alaska	0
2	San Miguel	4

*Game went into double overtime

== Transactions ==
=== Trades ===
==== Pre-season ====
July 25, 2014	To NLEX 2015 1st round pick	To San Miguel 2016 2nd round pick

September 12, 2014	To NLEX Juneric Baloria; 2016 & 2017 2nd round picks (from Blackwater)	To Blackwater Sunday Salvacion; Jason Ballesteros (from Meralco)	To Meralco Sean Anthony (from NLEX via Blackwater)
September 22, 2014	To NLEX Harold Arboleda and 2018 2nd round pick (from Talk 'n Text via Globalport); 2016 2nd round pick (from Ginebra via GlobalPort)	To GlobalPort Nonoy Baclao and 2017 1st round pick (from Talk 'n Text)	To Talk 'N Text Jay Washington (from GlobalPort); Matt Ganuelas (from NLEX via GlobalPort)

October 4, 2014	To NLEX Kevin Alas	To Rain or Shine 2015 1st round pick

October 9, 2014	To NLEX Niño Canaleta (from Talk 'N Text via Blackwater)	To Blackwater Larry Rodriguez; 2015 1st round pick (from Talk 'N Text)	To Talk 'N Text Kevin Alas (from NLEX); 2015 1st round pick (from Blackwater)

==== Philippine Cup ====
November 27, 2014	To NLEX Rudy Lingganay	To Kia Eliud Poligrates

=== Recruited imports ===
Tournament	Name	Debuted	Last game	Record
Commissioner's Cup	Al Thornton	February 3 (vs Rain or Shine)	March 29 (vs Meralco)	6–7
Governors' Cup	Kwame Alexander	May 6 (vs Barako Bull)	June 24 (vs Barangay Ginebra)	3–8
Governors' Cup	(Syria) Michael Madanly*	May 6 (vs Barako Bull)	June 24 (vs Barangay Ginebra)	3–8

(* Asian import)
