= Boyet Fernandez =

Filipino basketball player (born 1971)

Biñan Tatak Gel
- Position: Head coach
- League: MPBL

Personal information
- Born: July 30, 1971 (age 55) Bacolod, Philippines

Career information
- College: CSA Bacolod
- PBA draft: 1993: 1st round, 7th overall pick
- Drafted by: Swift Mighty Meaties
- Playing career: 1993–2004
- Coaching career: 2007–present

Career history

Playing
- 1993–1997: Sta. Lucia Realtors
- 1997: Alaska Milkmen
- 1997–1999: Pop Cola Panthers
- 1999–2003: Purefoods Tender Juicy Hotdogs
- 2004: Sta. Lucia Realtors

Coaching
- 2004–2007: Sta. Lucia Realtors (assistant)
- 2007–2010: Sta. Lucia Realtors
- 2010: UP
- 2010–2013: Meralco Bolts
- 2011–2014: NLEX Road Warriors (PBA D-League)
- 2013–2014: San Beda
- 2014–2016: NLEX Road Warriors (PBA)
- 2017–2022: San Beda
- 2022–present: San Beda (consultant)
- 2023: Pasig City MCW Sports
- 2024–present: Biñan Tatak Gel

Career highlights
- As coach: PBA champion (2007–08 Philippine); PBA Coach of the Year (2007–08); 8× PBA D-League champion; 4× NCAA champion (2013–2014, 2017–2018); 2x Filoil Preseason Cup Champion (San Beda) 2017 & 2019; As assistant coach: 2x NCAA champion (2023, 2025); As player: PBA champion (2002 Governors')

Teodorico "Boyet" Fernandez III is a Filipino former professional basketball player who serves as the head coach of the Biñan Tatak Gel of the Maharlika Pilipinas Basketball League (MPBL).

== Playing career ==
Fernandez first broke into public consciousness as a member of the highly touted 1991 Southeast Asian Games gold medal-winning team, where he was back-up to Johnny Abarrientos. Prior to that, he was part of the National Team that finished seventh in the Asian Basketball Confederation (ABC), forerunner of FIBA-Asia. He played college ball for Colegio San Agustin-Bacolod.

He is known for his years as a player with the Sta. Lucia Realtors, Alaska Milkmen, Pop Cola 800s, and the Purefoods TJ Hotdogs. He was once considered by national coach Ron Jacobs as the best back up point guard in the PBA. He was also named into the 2002 Philippine National Training Pool and was listed as a reserve player.

== Coaching career ==
Fernandez's first coaching stint was as an assistant to Alfrancis Chua with the Sta. Lucia Realtors, a position he took on shortly after his retirement in 2004. He succeeded Chua as head coach prior to the 2007 PBA Fiesta Conference. The following year, he guided the franchise to its first-ever and only PBA All-Filipino title, winning the 2007–08 PBA Philippine Cup. For this, he was named PBA Coach of the Year.

He was the last head coach of the Realtors before the team disbanded in 2010.

He also took over the coaching reins of UP Fighting Maroons in the UAAP midway through the 2010 season.

When NLEX Road Warriors joined the PBA D-League in 2011, he took the coaching job and guided the team to six championships in seven conferences.

He was recently the coach for the San Beda Red Lions, a position he took from Ronnie Magsanoc in 2013. He guided the Red Lions to two NCAA Championships.

After NLEX purchased the Air21 franchise in the PBA in 2014, he was tapped as the head tactician for the Road Warriors starting the 2014–15 PBA season.

== Coaching record ==
=== Professional record ===
Season	Team	Conference	G	W	L	PCT	Finish	PG	W	L	PCT	Results
2006-07	Sta. Lucia	Fiesta	18	5	13	.278	9th	1	0	1	.000	Lost in the 1st wildcard round
2007-08	Sta. Lucia	Philippine Cup	18	12	6	.667	2nd	14	8	6	.571	Won Philippine Cup
2007-08	Sta. Lucia	Fiesta	18	7	11	.389	9th	4	2	2	.500	Lost in the quarterfinals
2008-09	Sta. Lucia	Philippine Cup	18	10	8	.556	5th	9	5	4	.000	Won third place
2008-09	Sta. Lucia	Fiesta	14	7	7	.500	5th	4	2	2	.500	Lost in the quarterfinals
2009-10	Sta. Lucia	Philippine Cup	18	10	8	.556	6th	1	0	1	.000	Lost in the 1st wildcard round
2009-10	Sta. Lucia	Fiesta	18	5	13	.278	8th	1	0	1	.000	Lost in the 1st wildcard round
2014-15	NLEX	Philippine Cup	11	4	7	.364	10th	1	0	1	.000	Lost in the quarterfinals
2014-15	NLEX	Commissioner's Cup	11	6	5	.545	4th	2	0	2	.000	Lost in the quarterfinals
2014-15	NLEX	Governors' Cup	11	3	8	.273	11th	—	—	—	—	Missed playoffs
2015–16	NLEX	Philippine Cup	11	5	6	.455	7th	1	0	1	.000	Lost in the phase 1 quarterfinals
2015–16	NLEX	Commissioner's Cup	11	5	6	.455	7th	1	0	1	.000	Lost in the quarterfinals
2015–16	NLEX	Governors' Cup	11	5	6	.455	7th	1	0	1	.000	Lost in the quarterfinals
Totals			188	84	104	.446	Playoff totals	31	12	19	.387	1 championship

=== Collegiate record ===
Season	Team	GP	W	L	PCT	Finish	PG	PW	PL	PCT	Results
2010	UP	12	0	12	.000	8th	–	–	–	–	Eliminated
2013	SBC	18	15	3	.833	1st	4	3	1	.750	Champions
2014	SBC	18	13	5	.722	1st	4	4	0	1.000	Champions
2017	SBC	18	16	2	.889	2nd	3	3	0	1.000	Champions
2018	SBU	18	17	1	.944	1st	3	3	0	1.000	Champions
2019	SBU	18	18	0	1.000	1st	3	1	2	.333	Finals
2021	SBU	9	7	2	.778	3rd	3	2	1	.667	Semifinals
Totals		111	86	25	.774		20	16	4	.800	4 championships

== Personal life ==
Fernandez became nurse in 1991, but instead he pursue professional basketball. He was initially attempted to pursue the profession, but hired by Sta. Lucia Realtors.

Preceded by Alfrancis Chua	Sta. Lucia Realtors head coach 2007-2010	Succeeded by (final)
Preceded by Jong Uichico	PBA Coach of the Year; 2007-2008	Succeeded by Chot Reyes
Preceded by Aboy Castro	UP Fighting Maroons men's basketball head coach 2010 took over mid-season	Succeeded by Ricky Dandan
Preceded by Ronnie Magsanoc	San Beda Red Lions men's basketball head coach 2013-2014	Succeeded by Jamike Jarin
Preceded by first	NLEX Road Warriors (PBA D-League) head coach 2011-2014	Succeeded by elevated
Preceded by first	NLEX Road Warriors head coach 2014–2016	Succeeded by Yeng Guiao
Preceded by Jamike Jarin	San Beda Red Lions men's basketball head coach 2017-2021	Succeeded by Yuri Escueta
