= Jansen Rios =

Filipino basketball player (born 1991)

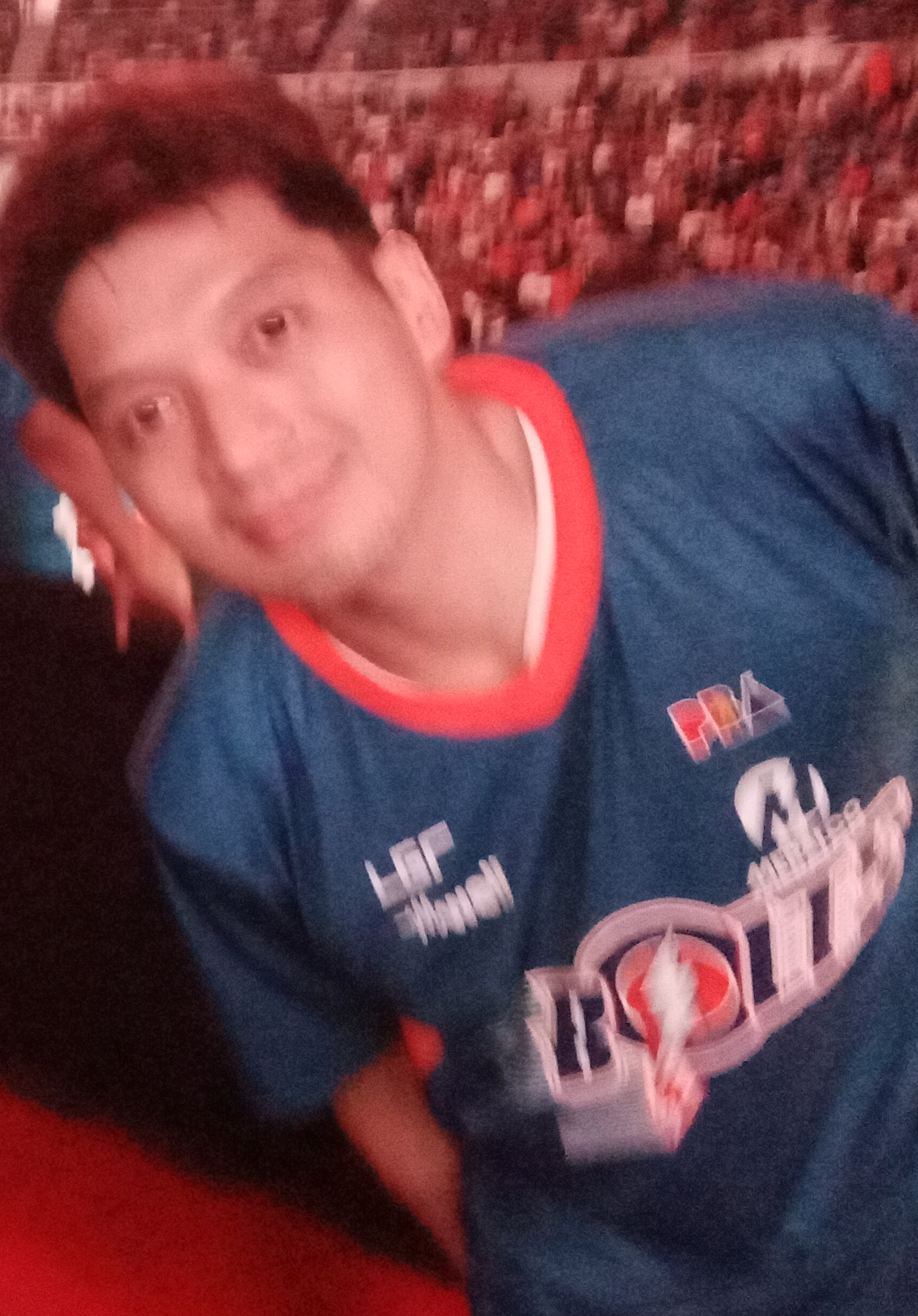
- Rios in 2024

No. 27 – Meralco Bolts
- Position: Small forward
- League: PBA

Personal information
- Born: October 28, 1991 (age 35) Romblon, Philippines
- Listed height: 6 ft 3 in (1.91 m)
- Listed weight: 185 lb (84 kg)

Career information
- College: Adamson (2010–2014)
- PBA draft: 2015: 3rd round, 25th overall pick
- Drafted by: NLEX Road Warriors
- Playing career: 2015–present

Career history
- 2015–2019: NLEX Road Warriors
- 2020–2022: Phoenix Super LPG Fuel Masters
- 2023–present: Meralco Bolts

Career highlights
- PBA champion (2024 Philippine)

Jansen Mani Rios (born October 28, 1991) is a Filipino professional basketball player for the Meralco Bolts of the Philippine Basketball Association (PBA). He was selected 25th overall in the 2015 PBA draft.

== Collegiate career ==
He was recruited by Leo Austria to play basketball for the Adamson Falcons.

Season	Team	G	MPG	FG%	3P%	FT%	RPG	APG	SPG	BPG	PPG
2011–12	Adamson	5	2.80	0.667	0.000	0.500	0.40	0.20	0.20	0.00	1.00
2012–13	Adamson	13	12.62	0.439	0.333	0.650	2.62	0.69	0.62	0.31	5.08
2013–14	Adamson	13	13.08	0.500	0.286	0.812	1.62	0.92	0.54	0.15	5.15
2014–15	Adamson	14	31.43	0.333	0.246	0.631	7.86	1.86	0.71	0.29	12.07

== Professional career ==
Rios was drafted 25th overall by the NLEX Road Warriors in the 2015 PBA draft.

On January 25, 2020, Rios signed a one-year contract with the Phoenix Super LPG Fuel Masters after not being offered a contract by NLEX. He signed a two-year extension with Phoenix Super LPG on February 15, 2021.

After his contract ended with Fuel Masters, Rios signed a one-year contract with the Meralco Bolts on January 19, 2023.

== PBA career statistics ==
Legend
GP	Games played	MPG	Minutes per game	FG%	Field-goal percentage
3FG%	3-point field-goal percentage	4P%	4-point field-goal percentage	FT%	Free-throw percentage
RPG	Rebounds per game	APG	Assists per game	SPG	Steals per game
BPG	Blocks per game	PPG	Points per game	127	Career high

As of the end of 2025–26 season

=== Season-by-season averages ===
Year	Team	GP	MPG	FG%	3P%	4P%	FT%	RPG	APG	SPG	BPG	PPG
2015–16	NLEX	3	3.0	.000	.000	—	.750	—	—	—	—	1.0
2016–17	NLEX	29	13.5	.362	.323	—	.654	2.6	1.1	.9	.3	4.5
2017–18	NLEX	20	9.5	.358	.269	—	.500	1.2	1.5	.3	.4	2.9
2019	NLEX	14	11.2	.526	.368	—	.500	1.8	.9	.6	.1	3.8
2020	Phoenix Super LPG	17	10.8	.423	.263	—	.714	1.8	.6	.4	.2	3.2
2021	Phoenix Super LPG	23	8.8	.339	.258	—	.250	1.0	.4	.4	.1	2.2
2022–23	Phoenix Super LPG	27	8.9	.316	.265	—	.143	1.1	.5	.7	.3	1.7
2022–23	Meralco	27	8.9	.316	.265	—	.143	1.1	.5	.7	.3	1.7
2023–24	Meralco	28	7.2	.340	.273	—	.800	1.0	.4	.2	.1	1.6
2024–25	Meralco	38	12.5	.415	.288	.167	.625	1.8	.7	.6	.1	3.8
2025–26	Meralco	24	10.9	.500	.526	—	.400	1.7	.4	.5	.1	3.6
Career		223	10.4	.392	.315	.167	.562	1.5	.7	.5	.2	3.0

== Personal life ==
Basketball was not his first sport. Jansen played center forward for his elementary and high school teams. And growing up, he rooted for Liverpool FC where aside from Steven Gerrard, he observed the techniques of former striker, the 6’8” Peter Crouch. Watching Crouch closely, Rios, standing at 6’2” used his height advantage in winning headers and corners to score goals.
