= Michael Dunigan =

American basketball player (born 1989)

Personal information
- Born: July 2, 1989 (age 37) Chicago, Illinois, U.S.
- Listed height: 6 ft 9 in (2.06 m)
- Listed weight: 254 lb (115 kg)

Career information
- High school: Farragut Academy (Chicago, Illinois)
- College: Oregon (2008–2010)
- NBA draft: 2011: undrafted
- Playing career: 2010–2018
- Position: Center

Career history
- 2010–2011: Hapoel Jerusalem
- 2010–2011: →BC Kalev
- 2011: Junior Pallacanestro Casale
- 2011–2012: Dnipro-Azot
- 2012–2013: Perth Wildcats
- 2013: Air21 Express
- 2013–2014: Seoul Samsung Thunders
- 2013–2014: Wonju Dongbu Promy
- 2014–2015: Canton Charge
- 2015: Barangay Ginebra San Miguel
- 2015–2017: Canton Charge
- 2017–2018: Wisconsin Herd
- 2018: Soles de Mexicali

Career highlights
- KML champion (2011); KBL All-Star (2014); Third-team Parade All-American (2008); McDonald's All-American (2008)
- Stats at Basketball Reference

Michael René Dunigan (born July 2, 1989) is an American former professional basketball player. He played college basketball for the Oregon Ducks.

== High school career ==
Dunigan attended Farragut Academy in Chicago, Illinois. As a junior, he averaged 18 points, 13 rebounds and six blocks per game. As a senior, he averaged 20 points, 12 rebounds and five blocks per game. The 2008 McDonald's All-American was rated as one of the top prep centers: No. 3 by ESPN.com, No. 5 by Scout.com and No. 8 by Rivals.com.

=== Awards and honors ===
- Jordan Brand All-American
- Illinois Gatorade Player of the Year
- Illinois’ Mr. Basketball Runner-up
- Third-team Parade All-American (2008)
- McDonald's All-American (2008)
- Chicago Tribune First Team All-State
- Chicago Sun Times All-Area selection
- All-Chicago Public League First Team honoree
- Chicago Defender's Co-Player of the Year
- Associated Press 4A All-State First Team

== College career ==
In his freshman season at Oregon, Dunigan was the team-leader in blocks at 1.0 block per game, ranking him sixth among Pac-10 Conference players. In 29 games (24 starts), he averaged 8.4 points and 4.6 rebounds per game.

In his sophomore season, he ranked fifth in the Pac-10 for blocks at 1.3 blocks per game. In 28 games (21 starts), he averaged 9.0 points and 4.9 rebounds per game.

== Professional career ==
=== 2010–11 season ===
In September 2010, Dunigan left Oregon, forgoing his junior and senior college years, and signed with Hapoel Migdal Jerusalem of Israel for the 2010–11 season. In November 2010, Dunigan was loaned to BC Kalev/Cramo of Estonia where he played out the rest of the season.

=== 2011–12 season ===
Following the 2010–11 season, Dunigan entered the 2011 NBA draft, but subsequently went undrafted. In July 2011, he signed with A.S. Junior Pallacanestro Casale of Italy for the 2011–12 season. On November 23, 2011, he left Casale and signed with Dnipro-Azot of Ukraine for the rest of the season.

=== 2012–13 season ===
On September 29, 2012, Dunigan signed with the Memphis Grizzlies. However, he was waived by the Grizzlies on October 23.

On December 1, 2012, Dunigan signed with the Perth Wildcats as a temporary replacement for the injured Matthew Knight. On January 5, 2013, he was released by the Wildcats following the return of Knight from injury. Later that month, Dunigan signed with Air21 Express of the Philippine Basketball Association to play in the 2013 Commissioner's Cup. In Dunigan's first game for Air21 Express, he recorded 24 points and 19 rebounds as his team went on to defeat Barangay Ginebra 74–70. In 15 games for Express, Dunigan averaged 23.9ppg, 15.4rpg, 3.3apg, and 2.4bpg.

=== 2013–14 season ===
Dunigan joined the Miami Heat for the 2013 NBA Summer League. Later that year, he was selected 5th overall in the 2013 KBL draft by the Seoul Samsung Thunders. On January 21, 2014, he was traded to the Wonju Dongbu Promy.

=== 2014–15 season ===
On November 2, 2014, Dunigan was selected by the Canton Charge with the 12th overall pick in the 2014 NBA D-League draft. In January 2015, he left Canton and signed with Barangay Ginebra San Miguel as an import for the 2015 PBA Commissioner's Cup. He played his final game for Barangay on March 28 before returning to the United States and re-joining the Charge on April 4.

=== 2015–16 season ===
On September 28, 2015, Dunigan signed with the Cleveland Cavaliers. However, he was later waived by the Cavaliers on October 10. On October 30, he returned to Canton. On November 14, he made his season debut for the Charge in a 106–99 loss to the Maine Red Claws, recording eight points, nine rebounds and one block in 25 minutes. On March 25, 2016, he was waived by the Charge after a sustaining a season-ending injury.

=== 2016–17 season ===
In November 2016, Dunigan re-joined the Canton Charge.

=== 2017–18 season ===
On August 23, 2017, Dunigan was selected by the Wisconsin Herd in the NBA G League expansion draft.

=== 2018–19 season ===
In September 2018, Dunigan signed with Soles de Mexicali of the Mexican Liga Nacional de Baloncesto Profesional. He played three games for Soles in October 2018.
