= Mark Cardona =

Filipino basketball player

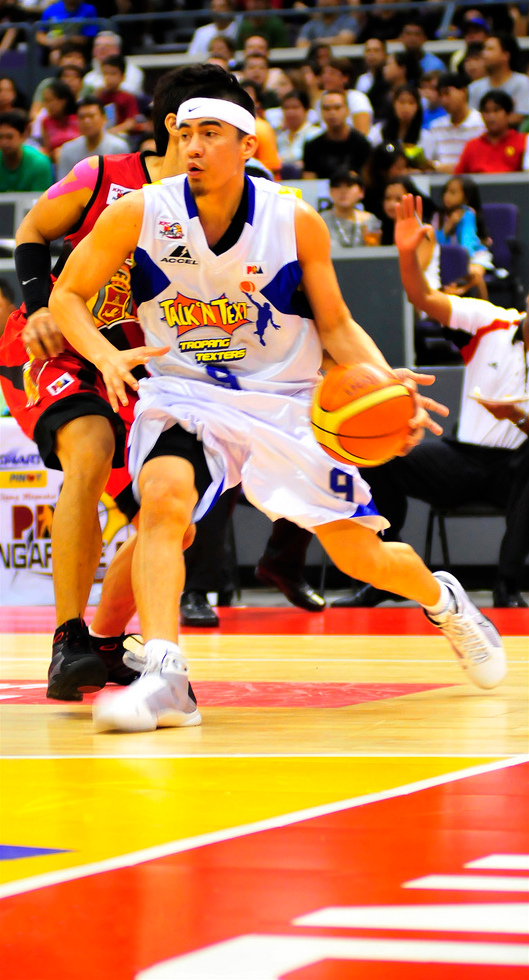
- Cardona with the TNT in 2008

Biñan Tatak Gel
- Title: Assistant coach
- League: MPBL

Personal information
- Born: November 3, 1981 (age 45) Mandaluyong, Philippines
- Listed height: 6 ft 1 in (1.85 m)
- Listed weight: 180 lb (82 kg)

Career information
- High school: Carson High School (Carson, California)
- College: De La Salle
- PBA draft: 2005: 1st round, 5th overall pick
- Drafted by: Air21 Express
- Playing career: 2005–2025
- Position: Point guard / shooting guard

Career history

Playing
- 2005–2010: Talk 'N Text Tropang Texters
- 2010–2013: Meralco Bolts
- 2013–2014: Air21 Express
- 2014–2016: NLEX Road Warriors
- 2017: GlobalPort Batang Pier
- 2018–2020: San Juan Knights
- 2021: JPS–Zamboanga City
- 2021: GenSan Warriors
- 2022–2023: Boracay Islanders
- 2023: Imus SV Squad
- 2023–2025: Biñan Tatak Gel

Coaching
- 2026–present: Biñan Tatak Gel (assistant)

Career highlights
- PBA champion (2008–09 Philippine); PBA Finals Most Valuable Player (2008–09 Philippine); PBA Best Player of the Conference (2007 Fiesta); 5× PBA All-Star (2007–2011); PBA Mythical First Team (2009); 2× PBA Mythical Second Team (2007, 2010); PBA scoring champion (2008); MPBL champion (2019 Datu); All-PSL Super Five (2023); PSL Inspirational Player Award (2023); UAAP champion (2001); UAAP Finals Most Valuable Player (2004); UAAP Mythical First Team (2004); 2× UAAP Leading scorer (2003, 2004); UAAP Rookie of the Year (2001); UAAP All-Rookie Team (2001); PBL Most Valuable Player (2005 Unity); 3× PBL Mythical First Team (2002-03 Challenge, 2004-05 Open Championships, 2005 Unity); PBL Top Newcomer (2002-03 Challenge); PBL Scoring Sensation (2004-05 Open Championships)

Mark Reynan Mikesell Cardona (born November 3, 1981) is a Filipino professional basketball former player and assistant coach for the Biñan Tatak Gel of the Maharlika Pilipinas Basketball League (MPBL) and Pilipinas Super League (PSL). From a successful college career with the De La Salle University (DLSU) Green Archers, Cardona was taken fifth overall by Air21 Express in the 2005 PBA draft. A five-time PBA All-Star, Cardona was the PBA scoring champion in 2008 and won the 2008–09 PBA Philippine Cup and Finals MVP award with Talk 'N Text.

== Early life ==
Cardona was born on November 3, 1981, in Mandaluyong, Metro Manila to Reynaldo Cardona and Griselda. The youngest of five children, Cardona got his elementary education from various schools, which include NAMEI Polytechnic Institute, Jose Rizal College, Isaac Lopez Elementary School, and a public school in Cardona, Rizal.

== Amateur career ==
He spent most of high school at Carson High School in the United States where he finished Level 10, which did not qualify him for a diploma. Cardona eventually came back home to the Philippines and took the DECS (now DepEd) Philippine Educational Placement Test (PEPT) to be eligible for admission to college. With the intent of using his basketball skills as a passport to a good college education, he walked in for a tryout with the De La Salle University Green Archers basketball team. He played for La Salle's UAAP championship team of 2001.

Despite several controversies and allegations, primarily regarding his residency and eligibility, Cardona went on to win the University Athletic Association of the Philippines Rookie of the Year award with the Green Archers in 2001. Cardona was also part of the UAAP 67th season Mythical Five and was named the Finals MVP for the same season.

Cardona played for ICTSI-La Salle in the Philippine Basketball League from 2002 to 2005, where he was awarded top rookie honors as PBL Top Newcomer. After ICTSI's departure from the league, Cardona joined Harbour Centre in the 2005 PBL Unity Cup, where he was named MVP of the conference.

During his stint at the amateur PBL, he was consistently named to the Mythical Team and also received recognition as the league's Scoring Sensation award.

== Professional career ==
=== 2005 PBA draft ===
In August 2005, Cardona was picked fifth overall by the Air21 Express during the 2005 PBA draft.

=== Talk 'N Text Tropang Texters (2005–2010) ===
Before the season started, he was eventually traded to the Talk 'N Text Tropang Texters franchise.

Despite a slow start in his rookie season, Cardona played significant minutes under Derrick Pumaren who replaced Joel Banal as the team's head coach.

In his second year in the league, Cardona recorded a career-high of 38 points. During a two-week period, he scored 30 or more points three different times, demonstrating his scoring ability. He is named PBA Press Corps' Player of the Week seven times within one conference (2007 Fiesta Conference). As a confirmation of his explosiveness and a testament to his overall tenacity as a player, Cardona received the PBA Conference Best Player award for the 2007 Fiesta Conference. He was also an official nominee for the coveted Most Valuable Player award of the 2006-2007 season.

In November 2008, Cardona once again reset his career statistics by tallying 42 points together with 6 rebounds to propel Talk 'N Text Tropang Texters over the Red Bull Barako. Cardona claimed that the feat sent a clear message that he deserved to be part of the Philippine National Team. Although he wasn't chosen to be part of the line-up, National Team coach Yeng Guiao was quick to point out that Cardona was considered “even if he did not score 42 points as he did against our team (Red Bull)."

Cardona won his first (and only) championship as a professional basketball player via the 2008–09 PBA Philippine Cup on February 11, 2009. Although losing on votes to the Alaska Aces' star Willie Miller for the Best Player of the Conference trophy, Cardona was awarded the PBA Finals Most Valuable Player honors for his remarkable output during the championship series.

=== Meralco Bolts (2010–2013) ===
On August 20, 2010, Cardona was traded by Talk 'N Text to its sister team and expansion team Meralco Bolts in exchange of a first-round pick. Cardona played his first game for the Bolts on October 3, 2010, against the Baranggay Ginebra Kings. He recorded 12 points, 6 rebounds and 4 assists in 33 minutes of play, including the game-winning teardrop.

=== Air21 Express / NLEX Road Warriors (2013–2016) ===
On October 14, 2013, he was traded by the Bolts to Air21 Express in a complex three-team trade that also involved Cardona's former team Talk 'N Text. In Air21, he was reunited with his former college coach at La Salle, Franz Pumaren and other former college teammates.

== Personal life ==
On August 21, 2016, Cardona was rushed to the hospital following a drug overdose in an apparent suicide attempt. He was confined at the intensive care unit (ICU) of the University of Perpetual Help Hospital in Las Piñas after his vital signs stabilized.

With his relationship with live-in partner Bianca reportedly on the rocks, he allegedly took a huge amount of prescription pills which he even posted on his Instagram account, which was later deleted. He was also placed in the injured reserved list by the team after injuring himself in an accident while riding an all-terrain vehicle a few months prior the incident.

On May 5, 2018, Cardona was arrested for allegedly injuring his live-in partner, Bianca Nicole Jackes, with a bladed weapon. Jackes sustained a stab wound on her left arm after being stabbed by Cardona during an argument around 5:30 AM.

== PBA career statistics ==
Legend
GP	Games played	MPG	Minutes per game
FG%	Field-goal percentage	3P%	3-point field-goal percentage	FT%	Free-throw percentage
RPG	Rebounds per game	APG	Assists per game	SPG	Steals per game
BPG	Blocks per game	PPG	Points per game	**Bold**	Career high

Led the league

=== Season-by-season averages ===
Year	Team	GP	MPG	FG%	3P%	FT%	RPG	APG	SPG	BPG	PPG
2005–06	Talk 'N Text	37	17.4	.482	.271	.698	2.8	1.1	.8	.1	7.7
2006–07	Talk 'N Text	**62**	30.8	.479	.378	.687	4.4	2.5	.7	**.2**	18.1
2007–08	Talk 'N Text	37	29.0	.490	.329	.722	4.4	3.3	.7	**.2**	16.9
2008–09	Talk 'N Text	46	33.1	.448	.359	.664	4.1	2.3	1.0	**.2**	**20.0**
2009–10	Talk 'N Text	47	31.5	.451	.312	.693	3.8	2.9	1.0	**.2**	17.1
2010–11	Meralco	24	**35.3**	.392	.290	**.817**	**5.0**	**3.5**	**1.1**	.0	18.7
2011–12	Meralco	40	33.6	.470	.286	.688	4.7	2.6	.9	**.2**	15.8
2012–13	Meralco	43	27.2	.459	.325	.696	3.6	1.6	.7	.1	12.1
2013–14	Air21	37	23.4	.388	.250	.759	3.0	1.1	.7	.1	9.9
2014–15	NLEX	36	25.1	.453	.264	.745	4.7	1.4	.8	.1	11.0
2015–16	NLEX	15	11.9	.473	.333	.750	1.9	.8	.6	.1	4.1
2016–17	GlobalPort	5	14.9	**.615**	**.667**	—	1.4	.7	.6	—	7.2
Career		429	28.0	.454	.324	.708	3.9	2.2	.8	.1	14.5
