= 2008–09 PBA Philippine Cup =

- Duration: October 4, 2008 – February 11, 2009
- TV partner(s): C/S9, Basketball TV (Local); The Filipino Channel (International)

Finals
- Champions: Talk 'N Text Tropang Texters
- Runners-up: Alaska Aces

Awards
- Best Player: Willie Miller (Alaska Aces)
- Finals MVP: Mark Cardona (Talk 'N Text Tropang Texters)

PBA Philippine Cup chronology
- < 2007–08 2009–10 >

PBA conference chronology
- < 2008 Fiesta 2009 Fiesta >

The 2008-09 Philippine Basketball Association (PBA) Philippine Cup or known as the 2008-09 KFC PBA Philippine Cup for sponsorship reasons, was the first conference of the 2008-09 PBA season. The tournament started on October 4, 2008, and ended on February 11, 2009. The new conference will have games on Thursdays and Saturdays. The tournament is an All-Filipino format, which bans an import or a pure-foreign player for each team.

The tournament featured the first ever regular season game played in Singapore. It was played at the Singapore Indoor Stadium between the Talk 'N Text Tropang Texters and the San Miguel Beermen on November 30.

== Format ==
The following format was observed for the duration of the conference:

- Double-round robin eliminations; 18 games per team; Teams are then seeded by basis on win–loss records. Ties are broken among points differences of the tied teams if the teams are not tied for #2, #5 or #9. If tied on those seeds, an extra game will be played to determine which team clinches the higher seed.
- Teams seeded #6 vs # 9 and #7 vs # 8 both games is knock out then winner of both games advance the next knock out games to determine witch teams go to quarterfinals
- #3, #4 and #5 teams automatically advance to the best of three quarterfinals:
  - #3 team vs. winner of knockout wildcard
  - #4 vs. #5 teams
- #1 and #2 teams automatically advance to the best of seven semifinals:
  - Winner of first quarterfinal vs. #1
  - Winner of second quarterfinal vs. #2
- The winners in the semifinals advance to the best-of-seven Finals. The losers dispute the third-place trophy in a one-game playoff.

== Elimination round ==
=== Team standings ===
Pos	Team	W	L	PCT	GB	Qualification
1	Alaska Aces	12	6	.667	—	Advance to semifinals
2	Talk 'N Text Tropang Texters	11	7	.611	1	Advance to semifinals
3	Barangay Ginebra Kings	10	8	.556 (Note: Head-to-head differential: Barangay Ginebra +16, Rain or Shine −3, Sta. Lucia −13)	2	Advance to quarterfinals
4	Rain or Shine Elasto Painters	10	8	.556	2	Advance to quarterfinals
5	Sta. Lucia Realtors	10	8	.556	2	Advance to quarterfinals
6	San Miguel Beermen	9	9	.500	3	Advance to wildcard round
7	Purefoods Tender Juicy Giants	8	10	.444 (Note: Head-to-head record: Purefoods 2–0 Air21)	4	Advance to wildcard round
8	Air21 Express	8	10	.444	4	Advance to wildcard round
9	Coca-Cola Tigers	7	11	.389	5	Advance to wildcard round
10	Red Bull Barako	5	13	.278	7	

Source: PBA.ph

=== Schedule ===
	Round 1									Round 2								
Team ╲ Game	1	2	3	4	5	6	7	8	9	10	11	12	13	14	15	16	17	18
Air21	ROS	TNT	BGK	Coke	SLR	ALA	PF	SMB	ROS	Coke	RBB	SMB	PF	BGK	SLR	RBB	ALA	TNT
Alaska	SMB	Coke	RBB	ROS	TNT	A21	BGK	SLR	PF	SMB	ROS	TNT	SLR	Coke	RBB	BGK	A21	PF
Barangay Ginebra	SLR	A21	RBB	SMB	PF	ALA	ROS	Coke	TNT	PF	SLR	Coke	RBB	A21	ALA	TNT	SMB	ROS
Coca-Cola	TNT	ALA	PF	A21	SLR	ROS	RBB	BGK	SMB	A21	PF	ROS	BGK	ALA	TNT	SMB	SLR	RBB
Purefoods	RBB	SMB	Coke	SLR	ROS	BGK	A21	TNT	ALA	RBB	BGK	Coke	SMB	A21	ROS	SLR	TNT	ALA
Rain or Shine	A21	RBB	SMB	ALA	PF	Coke	TNT	BGK	A21	SLR	ALA	Coke	RBB	SLR	PF	TNT	SMB	BGK
Red Bull	PF	ROS	ALA	BGK	SMB	TNT	Coke	SLR	PF	TNT	A21	ROS	BGK	SMB	ALA	A21	Coke	SLR
San Miguel	ALA	PF	ROS	TNT	BGK	RBB	SLR	A21	Coke	ALA	SLR	PF	A21	TNT	RBB	Coke	ROS	BGK
Sta. Lucia	BGK	TNT	PF	Coke	A21	SMB	ALA	RBB	ROS	SMB	BGK	TNT	ALA	ROS	A21	PF	Coke	RBB
Talk 'N Text	Coke	A21	SLR	SMB	ALA	RBB	ROS	PF	BGK	RBB	ALA	SLR	SMB	Coke	ROS	PF	BGK	A21

= Win; = OT win; = Loss; = OT loss

== Bracket ==
Wildcard phase (Single elimination)
7	Purefoods	82
8	Air21	94
6	San Miguel	99
9	Coca-Cola	89

Wildcard phase (Single elimination)
8	Air21	86
6	San Miguel	105

Quarterfinals (Best-of-3)
3	Ginebra	1
6	San Miguel	2
4	Rain or Shine	0
5	Sta. Lucia	2

Semifinals (Best-of-7)
2	Talk 'N Text	4
6	San Miguel	2
1	Alaska	4
5	Sta. Lucia	2

Finals (Best-of-7)
2	Talk 'N Text	4
1	Alaska	3
Third place
6	San Miguel	97
5	Sta. Lucia (OT)	99

== Wildcard phase ==
=== First round ===
C/S9

December 28

San Miguel Beermen 99, Coca-Cola Tigers 89

Araneta Coliseum, Quezon City

C/S9

December 28

Purefoods Tender Juicy Giants 82, Air21 Express 94

Araneta Coliseum, Quezon City

=== Second round ===
C/S9

January 4

San Miguel Beermen 105, Air21 Express 86

Araneta Coliseum, Quezon City

== Quarterfinals ==
=== (3) Barangay Ginebra vs. (6) San Miguel ===
C/S9

January 7

Barangay Ginebra Kings 77, San Miguel Beermen 78

Araneta Coliseum, Quezon City

C/S9

January 9

Barangay Ginebra Kings 91, San Miguel Beermen 88

Cuneta Astrodome, Pasay

C/S9

January 11

Barangay Ginebra Kings 93, San Miguel Beermen 98
San Miguel wins series, 2–1

Cuneta Astrodome, Pasay

In a battle of the two teams owned by the San Miguel Corporation, the Beermen escaped with a one-point win at game 1. The Kings averted elimination when the Beermen collapsed at Game 2, but Dondon Hontiveros lead the charge at game 3's fourth quarter to prevent a second-consecutive PBA championship for Ginebra as the Beermen closed out the Kings in a sold-out Cuneta Astrodome.

=== (4) Rain or Shine vs (5) Sta. Lucia ===
C/S9

January 7

Rain or Shine Elasto Painters 84, Sta. Lucia Realtors 101

Araneta Coliseum, Quezon City

C/S9

January 9

Rain or Shine Elasto Painters 85, Sta. Lucia Realtors 92
Sta. Lucia wins series, 2–0

Cuneta Astrodome, Pasay

In their first playoff appearance since joining the league in 2006, the Elasto Painters were overwhelmed in Game 1 by the defending champions, who played with the comebacking Ryan Reyes who just came from injury. Fracas involving Rain or Shine's Gabe Norwood and Solomon Mercado at the end of the first game caused Norwood to be suspended in Game 2, and Mercado on Game 3 if it happens. The short-handed Elasto Painters wound up short in Game 2 as they were eliminated.

== Semifinals ==
=== (1) Alaska vs (5) Sta. Lucia ===
C/S9

January 14

Alaska Aces 92, Sta. Lucia Realtors 76

Araneta Coliseum, Quezon City

C/S9

January 16

Alaska Aces 94, Sta. Lucia Realtors 87

Araneta Coliseum, Quezon City

C/S9

January 18

Alaska Aces 65, Sta. Lucia Realtors 76

Araneta Coliseum, Quezon City

C/S9

January 21

Alaska Aces 88, Sta. Lucia Realtors 83

Cuneta Astrodome, Pasay

C/S9

January 23

Alaska Aces 74, Sta. Lucia Realtors 81

Cuneta Astrodome, Pasay

C/S9

January 25

Alaska Aces 87, Sta. Lucia Realtors 83
Alaska wins series, 4–2

Cuneta Astrodome, Pasay

In a rematch of the 2007-08 semifinals series, the Aces won two consecutive game to lead the series 2–0. However, the Realtors won Game 3 to cut the series lead. But Alaska, seeking to prevent what happened last year, won Game 4 to take a commanding 3–1 series lead. Sta. Lucia won Game 5 but they came out short in Game 6 with Willie Miller having an all-around performance to lead the Aces to a rematch of the 2007 PBA Fiesta Conference Finals against Talk 'N Text.

=== (2) Talk 'N Text vs. (6) San Miguel ===
C/S9

January 14

Talk 'N Text Tropang Texters 129, San Miguel Beermen 100

Araneta Coliseum, Quezon City

C/S9

January 16

Talk 'N Text Tropang Texters 103, San Miguel Beermen 112

Araneta Coliseum, Quezon City

C/S9

January 18

Talk 'N Text Tropang Texters 110, San Miguel Beermen 106

Araneta Coliseum, Quezon City

C/S9

January 21

Talk 'N Text Tropang Texters 106, San Miguel Beermen 103

Cuneta Astrodome, Pasay

C/S9

January 23

Talk 'N Text Tropang Texters 115, San Miguel Beermen 125

Cuneta Astrodome, Pasay

C/S9

January 25

Talk 'N Text Tropang Texters 116, San Miguel Beermen 115 (OT)
Talk 'N Text wins series, 4–2

Cuneta Astrodome, Pasay

Unlike the other semifinal which was a slow defensive battle, the Talk 'N Text–San Miguel matchup was a high-scoring offensive-minded series, with both teams passing the century mark in all of the games. The Texters walloped the winded Beermen in Game 1 with a 29-point win, but the Beermen were able to get even with a Game 2 victory. The Texters escaped at Game 3 thanks to Jimmy Alapag's clutch baskets, despite Hontiveros' 39-point explosion.

In a do-or-die Game 5, Marc Pingris and former Talk 'N Text player Jay Washington had double-double efforts to prevent the Texters from barging in the Finals. With Yancy de Ocampo was suspended after committing a flagrant foul-penalty 2 against Danny Seigle in Game 6, his brother Ranidel was ejected in the second quarter with the same offense. The game was close until the third quarter when the Texters made a run, but the Beermen tied the game at the end of the fourth quarter; Alapag missed a go-ahead tree-pointer as time expired to force overtime. With 1:57 left in overtime, Washington scored on a put-back to put SMB up 115–113. On the next possession, Mark Cardona converted his own three-pointer to put TNT up 116–115. Washington missed a short stab, and Harvey Carey missed his own shot at the other end. Ali Peek tapped the ball, and Cardona grabbed it as time expired, to lead the Texters into the Finals.

== Third place playoff ==
C/S9

January 28

Sta. Lucia Realtors 99, San Miguel Beermen 97 (OT)

Araneta Coliseum, Quezon City

== Finals ==
C/S9

January 28

Alaska Aces 102, Talk 'N Text Tropang Texters 95

Araneta Coliseum, Quezon City

C/S9

January 30

Alaska Aces 100, Talk 'N Text Tropang Texters 91

Araneta Coliseum, Quezon City

C/S9

February 1

Alaska Aces 73, Talk 'N Text Tropang Texters 92

Araneta Coliseum, Quezon City

C/S9

February 4

Alaska Aces 98, Talk 'N Text Tropang Texters 100

Araneta Coliseum, Quezon City

C/S9

February 6

Alaska Aces 95, Talk 'N Text Tropang Texters 93

Cuneta Astrodome, Pasay

C/S9

February 8

Alaska Aces 94, Talk 'N Text Tropang Texters 99

Araneta Coliseum, Quezon City

C/S9

February 11

Alaska Aces 89, Talk 'N Text Tropang Texters 93
Talk 'N Text wins series, 4–3

Araneta Coliseum, Quezon City

== Awards ==
- Finals MVP: Mark Cardona (Talk 'N Text)
- Best Player of the Conference: Willie Miller (Alaska Aces)
- Players of the Week:
  - October 4–5: Solomon Mercado (Rain or Shine Elasto Painters)
  - October 6–12: Junjun Cabatu (Barangay Ginebra Kings)
  - October 13–19: Jay Washington (San Miguel Beermen) and Willie Miller (Alaska Aces)
  - October 20–26: Asi Taulava (Coca-Cola Tigers)
  - October 27 – November 2: James Yap and Kerby Raymundo (Purefoods TJ Giants)
  - November 3–9: Gary David (Air21 Express)
  - November 10–16: Mark Cardona (Talk 'N Text Tropang Texters)
  - November 17–23: Joseph Yeo (Sta. Lucia Realtors) and Ronjay Buenafe (Coca-Cola Tigers)
  - November 24–30: Jimmy Alapag (Talk 'N Text Tropang Texters)
  - December 1 – 7: Ranidel de Ocampo (Talk 'N Text Tropang Texters)
  - December 8–14: Jeffrei Chan (Red Bull Barako)
  - December 15–21: John Arigo (Coca-Cola Tigers) and Joseph Yeo (Sta. Lucia Realtors)
  - December 22–28: Ranidel de Ocampo (Talk 'N Text Tropang Texters)
  - December 29 – January 4: Bonbon Custodio (San Miguel Beermen)
  - January 5–11: Dondon Hontiveros (San Miguel Beermen)
  - January 12–18: Jimmy Alapag (Talk 'N Text Tropang Texters)
  - January 19–25: Mark Cardona (Talk 'N Text Tropang Texters)

== Conference records ==
Records marked with an asterisk (*) were accomplished with one or more overtime periods.

=== Team ===
Record	Stat	Holder	Date/s
Longest winning streak	5	Sta. Lucia Realtors	December 11 – January 13
Longest losing streak	8	Red Bull Barako	November 2 – December 14
Most points in one quarter	42	Sta. Lucia Realtors vs. Talk 'N Text Tropang Texters (4th Quarter)	October 12, 2008
Biggest winning margin	29	San Miguel Beermen 118, Barangay Ginebra Kings 89	October 22, 2008
Biggest winning margin	29	Talk 'N Text Tropang Texters 129, San Miguel Beermen 100	January 14, 2009

=== Individual ===
Record	Stat	Holder	Date/s
Most points in one game	42	Mark Cardona (Talk 'N Text Tropang Texters) vs. Red Bull Barako	November 16, 2008
Most points in one half	30	Gary David (Air21 Express) vs. San Miguel Beermen	November 5, 2008
Most points in one quarter	19	Gary David (Air21 Express) vs. San Miguel Beermen	November 5, 2008
Most rebounds in one game	25	Asi Taulava (Coca-Cola Tigers) vs. Air21 Express	November 15, 2008
Most assists in one game	12	LA Tenorio (Alaska Aces) vs. Talk 'N Text Tropang Texters	February 6, 2009
Most blocks in one game	6	Mike Hrabak (Red Bull Barako) vs. Purefoods TJ Giants	October 8, 2008
Most blocks in one game	6	J.R. Quiñahan (Air21 Express) vs. Brgy. Ginebra Kings	December 5, 2008
Most steals in one game	6	Bonbon Custodio (San Miguel Beermen) vs. Red Bull Barako	December 6, 2008
Most 3 point FG made in one game	8	3 Tied	3 Occasions
Most minutes played in one game	50*	James Yap (Purefoods TJ Giants) vs. Coca-Cola Tigers	October 15, 2008
Most minutes played in one game	50*	Asi Taulava (Coca-Cola Tigers) vs Purefoods TJ Giants	October 15, 2008

== Statistical leaders ==
Category	Player	Team	Stat	GP
Points per game	Mark Cardona	Talk 'N Text Tropang Texters	22.32	22
Rebounds per game	Asi Taulava	Coca-Cola Tigers	13.00	16
Assists per game	Alex Cabagnot	Coca-Cola Tigers	5.69	16
Steals per game	Ryan Reyes	Sta. Lucia Realtors	2.07	15
Blocks per game	J.R. Quiñahan	Air21 Express	2.00	19
Field goal percentage	Willy Wilson	Barangay Ginebra Kings	.548	21
Free throw percentage	Olsen Racela	San Miguel Beermen	.913	26
Three-point field goal percentage	Mark Macapagal	Coca-Cola Tigers	.477	19
