= Harold Arboleda =

Filipino basketball player

Personal information
- Born: September 9, 1990 (age 36) Bacoor, Cavite, Philippines
- Listed height: 6 ft 2 in (1.88 m)
- Listed weight: 180 lb (82 kg)

Career information
- College: Perpetual
- PBA draft: 2014: 2nd round, 20th overall pick
- Drafted by: Talk 'N Text Tropang Texters
- Playing career: 2014–present
- Position: Shooting guard / small forward

Career history
- 2014–2016: NLEX Road Warriors
- 2018: Parañaque Patriots
- 2018–2020: Zamboanga Family's Brand Sardines
- 2021: Tabogon Voyagers
- 2022: Cagayan Valley Golden Eagles
- 2022: Muntinlupa Cagers
- 2022–2023: 1Munti Emeralds
- 2023: Bacolod City of Smiles
- 2023–2024: 1Munti XUR Homes
- 2024–2025: Pablo Valiant Kings

Career highlights
- All-MPBL Second Team (2019)

Harold Miguel Davis Arboleda (born September 9, 1990) is a Filipino professional basketball player who last played for the Pablo Valiant Kings of the Pilipinas Super League (PSL). He was drafted 20th overall in the 2014 PBA draft by Talk 'N Text Tropang Texters.

== College career ==
In 2012, he was the Perpetual Help Altas starting small forward. Despite standing just 6 feet 3 inches, Arboleda emerged as the team's top rebounder. Arboleda averaged 5.9 rebounds, along with 6.2 points and 2.1 assists in 21.8 minutes per game. He was a solid rebounder and capable three-point shooter who makes hardly makes bad decisions, and has carried much of the scoring load during his later seasons with the departure of star guard Jet Vidal.

== Professional career ==
In 2014, Arboleda applied for the 2014 PBA draft, in which he was drafted 20th overall by the Talk 'N Text Tropang Texters. He was considered as the "steal of the draft" by many analysts, saying Arboleda as one of the best players of the Altas basketball program. On September 22, 2014, Arboleda was traded to NLEX along with 2nd-round picks for the 2016 and 2018 drafts for the rights of Matt Ganuelas-Rosser. He also suited up for the Tabogon Voyagers in the Visayas leg of the 2021 Chooks-to-Go Pilipinas VisMin Super Cup.

In February 2024, Arboleda is one of the 47 players banned by the MPBL for alleged involvement in game fixing.

== PBA career statistics ==
Legend
GP	Games played	MPG	Minutes per game
FG%	Field-goal percentage	3P%	3-point field-goal percentage	FT%	Free-throw percentage
RPG	Rebounds per game	APG	Assists per game	SPG	Steals per game
BPG	Blocks per game	PPG	Points per game	**Bold**	Career high

=== Season-by-season averages ===
Year	Team	GP	MPG	FG%	3P%	FT%	RPG	APG	SPG	BPG	PPG
2014–15	NLEX	**18**	**11.5**	**.417**	.312	.750	**1.9**	**.4**	**.2**	.0	**1.6**
2015–16	NLEX	**18**	6.3	.333	**.333**	**1.000**	1.3	.3	.1	**.1**	1.2
Career		36	8.9	.378	.323	.857	1.6	.4	.2	.1	1.4
