= Simon Atkins (basketball) =

Filipino basketball player

Personal information
- Born: July 19, 1988 (age 38) Makati, Philippines
- Listed height: 5 ft 11 in (1.80 m)
- Listed weight: 185 lb (84 kg)

Career information
- High school: De La Salle Zobel (Muntinlupa)
- College: De La Salle
- PBA draft: 2012: 3rd round, 21st overall pick
- Drafted by: Air21 Express
- Playing career: 2012–2020
- Position: Point guard

Career history
- 2012–2014: Air21 Express
- 2014–2018: Meralco Bolts
- 2019–2020: Makati Super Crunch

Career highlights
- UAAP champion (2007)

Simon David L. Atkins (born July 19, 1988) is a Filipino former professional basketball player. He was drafted 23rd overall by the Air21 Express in the 2012 PBA draft. He played college ball for De La Salle University where he won a championship in 2007 with the Green Archers.

== PBA career statistics ==
Legend
GP	Games played	MPG	Minutes per game
FG%	Field-goal percentage	3P%	3-point field-goal percentage	FT%	Free-throw percentage
RPG	Rebounds per game	APG	Assists per game	SPG	Steals per game
BPG	Blocks per game	PPG	Points per game	**Bold**	Career high

Correct as of October 19, 2016

=== Season-by-season averages ===
Year	Team	GP	MPG	FG%	3P%	FT%	RPG	APG	SPG	BPG	PPG
2012–13	Air21	**25**	10.8	.302	.250	**1.000**	**1.4**	1.5	.3	.0	2.0
2013–14	Air21	21	**16.7**	.328	.214	.769	1.1	1.6	.4	.0	**2.8**
2014–15	Meralco	22	12.2	.263	.214	.667	1.1	**1.7**	.4	**.1**	2.0
2015–16	Meralco	4	14.0	**.571**	**.500**	**1.000**	.8	1.3	**.5**	.0	**2.8**
Career		72	13.1	.309	.229	.794	1.2	1.6	.4	.0	2.3
