= 2020 NorthPort Batang Pier season =

- Head coach: Pido Jarencio
- Owner(s): Sultan 900 Capital, Inc.

Philippine Cup results
- Record: 1–10 (9.1%)
- Place: 11th
- Playoff finish: Did not qualify

NorthPort Batang Pier seasons

The 2020 NorthPort Batang Pier season was the 8th season of the franchise in the Philippine Basketball Association (PBA).

== Key dates ==
- December 8: The 2019 PBA draft took place on Robinsons Place Manila.
- March 11: The PBA postpones the season due to the threat of the coronavirus.

== Draft picks ==
| Round | Pick | Player | Position | Nationality | PBA D-League team | School |
|---|---|---|---|---|---|---|
| 1 | 8 | Sean Manganti | Small Forward | United States | Che'Lu Bar & Grill Revellers | Adamson |
| 2 | 24 | Renzo Subido | Point Guard | Philippines | Ironcon Builders | Santo Tomas |
| 3 | 31 | Cris Dumapig | Power Forward | Philippines | BRT Sumisip Basilan | Southwestern-U |
| 4 | 40 | Dexter Zamora | Point Guard | Philippines | Batangas - EAC | Lyceum |

== Roster ==
2020 NorthPort Batang Pier roster
Players
Coaches

| Pos. | # | POB | Name | Height | Weight | DOB (YYYY–MM–DD) | From |
|---|---|---|---|---|---|---|---|
| G/F | 0 | (Philippines) | Paolo Taha | 6 ft 0 in (1.83 m) | 180 lb (82 kg) | 1990–12–05 | St. Benilde |
| F | 1 | (United States) | Sean Manganti (R) | 6 ft 5 in (1.96 m) | | 1994–04–18 | Adamson |
| G | 5 | (Philippines) | Renzo Subido (R) | 5 ft 9 in (1.75 m) | 135 lb (61 kg) | 1996–02–17 | UST |
| G | 8 | (Philippines) | Robert Bolick (injured) | 6 ft 1 in (1.85 m) | 178 lb (81 kg) | 1995–09–13 | San Beda |
| G | 9 | (Philippines) | Nico Elorde | 5 ft 10 in (1.78 m) | 155 lb (70 kg) | 1991–10–04 | Ateneo |
| F | 10 | (Canada) | Sean Anthony (C) | 6 ft 4 in (1.93 m) | 200 lb (91 kg) | 1986–01–26 | McGill |
| G | 13 | (Philippines) | Garvo Lanete | 6 ft 2 in (1.88 m) | 180 lb (82 kg) | 1989–02–13 | San Beda |
| G/F | 14 | (Philippines) | Jonathan Grey (injured) | 6 ft 3 in (1.91 m) | 190 lb (86 kg) | 1992–01–13 | St. Benilde |
| F | 20 | (Philippines) | Jervy Cruz | 6 ft 4 in (1.93 m) | 220 lb (100 kg) | 1986–09–09 | UST |
| G | 27 | (Philippines) | LA Revilla | 5 ft 8 in (1.73 m) | 146 lb (66 kg) | 1989–11–30 | De La Salle |
| F/C | 30 | (Philippines) | Bradwyn Guinto | 6 ft 6 in (1.98 m) | 220 lb (100 kg) | 1991–10–20 | San Sebastian |
| F/C | 33 | (United States) | Kelly Nabong | 6 ft 6 in (1.98 m) | 227 lb (103 kg) | 1988–11–17 | SRJC |
| C | 34 | (Germany) | Christian Standhardinger | 6 ft 8 in (2.03 m) | 220 lb (100 kg) | 1989–07–04 | Hawaiʻi |
| F | 77 | (Philippines) | Kevin Ferrer | 6 ft 5 in (1.96 m) | 188 lb (85 kg) | 1993–03–26 | UST |

Head coach

- (Philippines) Pido Jarencio

Assistant coach(es)

- (Philippines) Rensy Bajar (1st assistant)
- (Philippines) Jeff Napa

Team manager

- (Philippines) Bonnie Tan
- (Philippines) Walyip Chong (assistant)

Legend

- (C) Team captain
- (CI) Commissioner's Cup Import
- (GI) Governors' Cup Import
- (EI) EASL Import
- (DP) Unsigned draft pick
- (FA) Free agent
- (IN) Inactive
- (S) Suspended
- (R) Rookie
- Injured

Roster

== Philippine Cup ==
=== Eliminations ===
==== Standings ====
| Pos | Team | W | L | PCT | GB | Qualification |
|---|---|---|---|---|---|---|
| 1 | Barangay Ginebra San Miguel | 8 | 3 | .727 (Note: Head-to-head record: Barangay Ginebra 1–0 Phoenix) | — | Twice-to-beat in quarterfinals |
| 2 | Phoenix Super LPG Fuel Masters | 8 | 3 | .727 | — | Twice-to-beat in quarterfinals |
| 3 | TNT Tropang Giga | 7 | 4 | .636 (Note: Head-to-head quotient: TNT 1.074, San Miguel 1.023, Meralco 0.992, Alaska 0.959, Magnolia 0.955) | 1 | Twice-to-beat in quarterfinals |
| 4 | San Miguel Beermen | 7 | 4 | .636 | 1 | Twice-to-beat in quarterfinals |
| 5 | Meralco Bolts | 7 | 4 | .636 | 1 | Twice-to-win in quarterfinals |
| 6 | Alaska Aces | 7 | 4 | .636 | 1 | Twice-to-win in quarterfinals |
| 7 | Magnolia Hotshots Pambansang Manok | 7 | 4 | .636 | 1 | Twice-to-win in quarterfinals |
| 8 | Rain or Shine Elasto Painters | 6 | 5 | .545 | 2 | Twice-to-win in quarterfinals |
| 9 | NLEX Road Warriors | 5 | 6 | .455 | 3 | |
| 10 | Blackwater Elite | 2 | 9 | .182 | 6 | |
| 11 | NorthPort Batang Pier | 1 | 10 | .091 (Note: Head-to-head record: NorthPort 1–0 Terrafirma) | 7 | |
| 12 | Terrafirma Dyip | 1 | 10 | .091 | 7 | |

Source: PBA.ph
Rules for classification: 1) winning percentage; 2) if two teams are tied, head to head record; if three or more teams are tied, head-to-head goal average (quotient), if tied for 8th, one-game playoff; 3) overall quotient 4) coin toss

==== Game log ====
2020 PBA Philippine Cup game log
Total: 1–10
October: 1–4

| Game | Date | Opponent | Score | High points | High rebounds | High assists | Location Attendance | Record |
|---|---|---|---|---|---|---|---|---|
| 1 | October 12 | Blackwater | L 89–96 | Christian Standhardinger (23) | Sean Anthony (13) | Anthony, Standhardinger (6) | AUF Sports Arena & Cultural Center | 0–1 |
| 2 | October 15 | Phoenix Super LPG | L 105–110 | Christian Standhardinger (28) | Sean Anthony (12) | Sean Anthony (10) | AUF Sports Arena & Cultural Center | 0–2 |
| 3 | October 18 | Rain or Shine | L 68–70 | Anthony, Lanete, Standhardinger (13) | Sean Anthony (12) | Anthony, Manganti (3) | AUF Sports Arena & Cultural Center | 0–3 |
| 4 | October 21 | NLEX | L 88–102 | Kevin Ferrer (18) | Christian Standhardinger (13) | Christian Standhardinger (5) | AUF Sports Arena & Cultural Center | 0–4 |
| 5 | October 24 | Terrafirma | W 107–96 | Christian Standhardinger (23) | Christian Standhardinger (12) | Standhardinger, Subido (5) | AUF Sports Arena & Cultural Center | 1–4 |

November: 0–6

| Game | Date | Opponent | Score | High points | High rebounds | High assists | Location Attendance | Record |
|---|---|---|---|---|---|---|---|---|
| 6 | November 3 | TNT | L 87–112 | Kelly Nabong (17) | Christian Standhardinger (12) | Elorde, Lanete, Manganti (3) | AUF Sports Arena & Cultural Center | 1–5 |
| 7 | November 4 | Ginebra | L 100–112 | Standhardinger, Ferrer (23) | Cruz, Standhardinger (11) | Renzo Subido (8) | AUF Sports Arena & Cultural Center | 1–6 |
| 8 | November 6 | Alaska | L 94–102 | Christian Standhardinger (39) | Christian Standhardinger (16) | Standhardinger, Ferrer (5) | AUF Sports Arena & Cultural Center | 1–7 |
| 9 | November 8 | Magnolia | L 76–83 | Standhardinger, Ferrer (18) | Christian Standhardinger (17) | Renzo Subido (6) | AUF Sports Arena & Cultural Center | 1–8 |
| 10 | November 10 | San Miguel | L 99–120 | Kelly Nabong (29) | Kelly Nabong (10) | Nico Elorde (8) | AUF Sports Arena & Cultural Center | 1–9 |
| 11 | November 11 | Meralco | L 73–80 | Jervy Cruz (15) | Jervy Cruz (17) | Nico Elorde (4) | AUF Sports Arena & Cultural Center | 1–10 |

== Transactions ==
=== Trades ===
==== Preseason ====
January
| January 9, 2020 | To NorthPort Kelly Nabong | To San Miguel Russel Escoto |
| January 20, 2020 | To NorthPort LA Revilla; Rey Guevarra | To Phoenix Sol Mercado |

=== Free agency ===
==== Addition ====
| Country | Player | Number | Position | Contract | Date signed | Former Team |
|---|---|---|---|---|---|---|
| (Philippines) | Garvo Lanete | 13 | Guard | 2 years | January 22 | re-signed |
| (Philippines) | Jervy Cruz | 20 | Forward | 1 year | January 22 | re-signed |
| (Philippines) | Kevin Ferrer | 77 | Forward | 2 years | January 23 | re-signed |
| (Canada) | Sean Anthony | 10 | Forward | 2 years | February 12 | re-signed |
| (United States) | Kelly Nabong | 33 | Forward / center | 1 year | February 12 | San Miguel |

==== Subtraction ====
| Country | Player | Number | Position | Reason | New Team |
|---|---|---|---|---|---|
| (Philippines) | Ryan Araña | 18 | Guard | Contract not extended. | Rain or Shine |

=== Rookie Signings ===
| Country | Player | Number | Position | Contract | Date signed | School/club team |
|---|---|---|---|---|---|---|
| (United States) | Sean Manganti | 1 | Small forward | 2 years | January 22 | Adamson |
| (Philippines) | Renzo Subido | – | Point guard | 1 year | January 22 | UST |
