= 2020 Barangay Ginebra San Miguel season =

- Head coach: Tim Cone
- Owners: Ginebra San Miguel, Inc. (a San Miguel Corporation subsidiary)

Philippine Cup results
- Record: 8–3 (72.7%)
- Place: 1st
- Playoff finish: Champions (Defeated TNT, 4–1)

Barangay Ginebra San Miguel seasons

The 2020 Barangay Ginebra San Miguel season was the 41st season of the franchise in the Philippine Basketball Association (PBA).

== Key dates ==
- December 8: The 2019 PBA draft took place in Midtown Atrium, Robinson Place Manila.
- March 11: The PBA postponed the season due to the threat of the coronavirus.

== Draft picks ==
Round	Pick	Player	Position	Nationality	College / Team
1	10	Arvin Tolentino	PF	Philippines	FEU
2	13	Jerrick Balanza	SG	Philippines	Letran
2	22	Kent Salado	SG	Philippines	Arellano
3	33	Fran Asuncion	PG	Philippines	AMA

== Roster ==
2020 Barangay Ginebra San Miguel roster
Players
Coaches

Pos.	#	POB	Name	Height	Weight	DOB (YYYY–MM–DD)	From
F	2	(United States)	Jared Dillinger	6 ft 4 in (1.93 m)	220 lb (100 kg)	1984–01–06	Hawaiʻi
G	3	(Philippines)	Kent Salado (R)	5 ft 9 in (1.75 m)		1994–11–10	Arellano
G	5	(Philippines)	LA Tenorio	5 ft 8 in (1.73 m)	151 lb (68 kg)	1984–07–09	Ateneo
G	6	(Philippines)	Scottie Thompson	6 ft 1 in (1.85 m)	180 lb (82 kg)	1993–07–12	UPHSD
F	10	(Philippines)	Arvin Tolentino (R)	6 ft 5 in (1.96 m)	210 lb (95 kg)	1995–11–05	Far Eastern
G	11	(United States)	Stanley Pringle	6 ft 1 in (1.85 m)	190 lb (86 kg)	1987–03–05	Penn State
F/C	12	(Philippines)	Prince Caperal	6 ft 7 in (2.01 m)	230 lb (104 kg)	1993–06–12	Arellano
G/F	16	(Philippines)	Jeff Chan	6 ft 2 in (1.88 m)	185 lb (84 kg)	1983–02–11	Far Eastern
F	18	(Philippines)	Arthur dela Cruz	6 ft 4 in (1.93 m)	210 lb (95 kg)	1992–05–09	San Beda
F/C	23	(Philippines)	Raymond Aguilar	6 ft 4 in (1.93 m)	200 lb (91 kg)	1985–07–27	National-U
C	25	(Philippines)	Japeth Aguilar	6 ft 9 in (2.06 m)	235 lb (107 kg)	1987–01–25	Western Kentucky
F	31	(Philippines)	Aljon Mariano	6 ft 3 in (1.91 m)	175 lb (79 kg)	1992–08–03	UST
F	38	(United States)	Joe Devance	6 ft 7 in (2.01 m)	225 lb (102 kg)	1982–02–19	UTEP
G	47	(Philippines)	Mark Caguioa	6 ft 1 in (1.85 m)	185 lb (84 kg)	1979–11–19	Glendale CC (CA)
G	70	(Philippines)	Jerrick Balanza (R)	6 ft 1 in (1.85 m)	190 lb (86 kg)	1996–09–06	Letran

Head coach

- (United States) Tim Cone

Assistant coach(es)

- (Philippines) Richard del Rosario (1st assistant)
- (Philippines) Freddie Abuda
- (United States) Kirk Collier
- (Philippines) Olsen Racela

Team manager

- (Philippines) Alfrancis Chua^{[a]}
- (Philippines) Raymond Rodriguez (Assistant)

Legend

- (C) Team captain
- (CI) Commissioner's Cup Import
- (GI) Governors' Cup Import
- (EI) EASL Import
- (DP) Unsigned draft pick
- (FA) Free agent
- (IN) Inactive
- (S) Suspended
- (R) Rookie
- Injured

Roster

- ^{a} Also serves as Barangay Ginebra's board governor.

== Philippine Cup ==
=== Eliminations ===
==== Standings ====
Pos	Team	W	L	PCT	GB	Qualification
1	Barangay Ginebra San Miguel	8	3	.727 (Note: Head-to-head record: Barangay Ginebra 1–0 Phoenix)	—	Twice-to-beat in quarterfinals
2	Phoenix Super LPG Fuel Masters	8	3	.727	—	Twice-to-beat in quarterfinals
3	TNT Tropang Giga	7	4	.636 (Note: Head-to-head quotient: TNT 1.074, San Miguel 1.023, Meralco 0.992, Alaska 0.959, Magnolia 0.955)	1	Twice-to-beat in quarterfinals
4	San Miguel Beermen	7	4	.636	1	Twice-to-beat in quarterfinals
5	Meralco Bolts	7	4	.636	1	Twice-to-win in quarterfinals
6	Alaska Aces	7	4	.636	1	Twice-to-win in quarterfinals
7	Magnolia Hotshots Pambansang Manok	7	4	.636	1	Twice-to-win in quarterfinals
8	Rain or Shine Elasto Painters	6	5	.545	2	Twice-to-win in quarterfinals
9	NLEX Road Warriors	5	6	.455	3	
10	Blackwater Elite	2	9	.182	6	
11	NorthPort Batang Pier	1	10	.091 (Note: Head-to-head record: NorthPort 1–0 Terrafirma)	7	
12	Terrafirma Dyip	1	10	.091	7	

Source: PBA.ph
Rules for classification: 1) winning percentage; 2) if two teams are tied, head to head record; if three or more teams are tied, head-to-head goal average (quotient), if tied for 8th, one-game playoff; 3) overall quotient 4) coin toss

==== Game log ====
2020 PBA Philippine Cup game log
Total: 8–3
October: 4–2

Game	Date	Opponent	Score	High points	High rebounds	High assists	Location Attendance	Record
1	October 11	NLEX	W 102–92	Aljon Mariano (20)	Scottie Thompson (11)	Pringle, Thompson (5)	AUF Sports Arena & Cultural Center	1–0
2	October 15	Blackwater	W 103–99	Prince Caperal (24)	Aljon Mariano (11)	Scottie Thompson (7)	AUF Sports Arena & Cultural Center	2–0
3	October 18	Meralco	W 105–91	Japeth Aguilar (20)	Stanley Pringle (7)	Dillinger, Thompson (5)	AUF Sports Arena & Cultural Center	3–0
4	October 21	Phoenix Super LPG	W 86–71	Stanley Pringle (20)	Prince Caperal (10)	Scottie Thompson (7)	AUF Sports Arena & Cultural Center	4–0
5	October 25	Magnolia	L 92–102	Stanley Pringle (24)	Scottie Thompson (14)	Scottie Thompson (7)	AUF Sports Arena & Cultural Center	4–1
6	October 27	Rain or Shine	L 82–85 (OT)	Scottie Thompson (21)	Japeth Aguilar (12)	Stanley Pringle (6)	AUF Sports Arena & Cultural Center	4–2

November: 4–1

Game	Date	Opponent	Score	High points	High rebounds	High assists	Location Attendance	Record
7	November 3	Alaska	W 87–81	Stanley Pringle (31)	Scottie Thompson (10)	Tenorio, Thompson (6)	AUF Sports Arena & Cultural Center	5–2
8	November 4	NorthPort	W 112–100	Stanley Pringle (17)	Aguilar, Pringle (8)	Scottie Thompson (8)	AUF Sports Arena & Cultural Center	6–2
9	November 6	TNT	W 85–79	Stanley Pringle (28)	Stanley Pringle (12)	LA Tenorio (9)	AUF Sports Arena & Cultural Center	7–2
10	November 8	San Miguel	L 66–81	Japeth Aguilar (13)	Aljon Mariano (12)	Scottie Thompson (10)	AUF Sports Arena & Cultural Center	7–3
11	November 9	Terrafirma	W 102–80	Japeth Aguilar (21)	Mariano, Thompson (11)	Scottie Thompson (9)	AUF Sports Arena & Cultural Center	8–3

=== Playoffs ===
==== Bracket ====
Quarterfinals (Top 4 twice-to-beat)
1	Barangay Ginebra	81
8	Rain or Shine	73
4	San Miguel	71	68
5	Meralco	78	90
2	Phoenix Super LPG	89
7	Magnolia	88
3	TNT	104
6	Alaska	83

Semifinals (Best-of-5)
1	Barangay Ginebra	3
5	Meralco	2
2	Phoenix Super LPG	2
3	TNT	3

Finals (Best-of-7)
1	Barangay Ginebra	4
3	TNT	1

==== Game log ====
2020 PBA Philippine Cup playoffs game log
Total: 8–3
Quarterfinals: 1–0

Game	Date	Opponent	Score	High points	High rebounds	High assists	Location Attendance	Series
1	November 13	Rain or Shine	W 81–73	Japeth Aguilar (23)	Japeth Aguilar (11)	LA Tenorio (8)	AUF Sports Arena & Cultural Center	1–0

Semifinals: 3–2

Game	Date	Opponent	Score	High points	High rebounds	High assists	Location Attendance	Record
1	November 18	Meralco	W 96–79	Stanley Pringle (19)	Scottie Thompson (9)	Scottie Thompson (8)	AUF Sports Arena & Cultural Center	1–0
2	November 20	Meralco	L 77–95	Japeth Aguilar (17)	Scottie Thompson (9)	Scottie Thompson (5)	AUF Sports Arena & Cultural Center	1–1
3	November 22	Meralco	W 91–84	Stanley Pringle (24)	Japeth Aguilar (13)	Stanley Pringle (6)	AUF Sports Arena & Cultural Center	2–1
4	November 25	Meralco	L 80–83	Stanley Pringle (18)	Japeth Aguilar (12)	Stanley Pringle (6)	AUF Sports Arena & Cultural Center	2–2
5	November 27	Meralco	W 83–80	Stanley Pringle (22)	Scottie Thompson (12)	Scottie Thompson (7)	AUF Sports Arena & Cultural Center	3–2

Finals: 4–1

Game	Date	Opponent	Score	High points	High rebounds	High assists	Location Attendance	Record
1	November 29	TNT	W 100–94 (OT)	Japeth Aguilar (25)	Japeth Aguilar (16)	LA Tenorio (10)	AUF Sports Arena & Cultural Center	1–0
2	December 2	TNT	W 92–90	Stanley Pringle (34)	Mariano, Thompson (9)	Stanley Pringle (8)	AUF Sports Arena & Cultural Center	2–0
3	December 4	TNT	L 67–88	LA Tenorio (19)	Japeth Aguilar (9)	LA Tenorio (6)	AUF Sports Arena & Cultural Center	2–1
4	December 6	TNT	W 98–88	Aguilar, Tenorio (22)	Prince Caperal (12)	Scottie Thompson (9)	AUF Sports Arena & Cultural Center	3–1
5	December 9	TNT	W 82–78	Japeth Aguilar (32)	Japeth Aguilar (9)	Pringle, Tenorio (6)	AUF Sports Arena & Cultural Center	4–1

== Transactions ==
=== Free agents ===
==== Rookie signings ====
Player	Signed	PBA D-League team
Arvin Tolentino	Undisclosed	Wang's Basketball Couriers
Jerrick Balanza	Undisclosed	Petron
Kent Salado	Undisclosed	Go for Gold

== Awards ==
Recipient	Award	Date awarded
Arvin Tolentino	Philippine Cup Rookie of the Week	November 24, 2020
LA Tenorio	Philippine Cup Finals Most Valuable Player	December 9, 2020
Stanley Pringle	Philippine Cup Best Player of the Conference	January 17, 2021
Honors
Stanley Pringle	Elite Five	January 17, 2021
Japeth Aguilar	Elite Five	January 17, 2021
Prince Caperal	Most Improved Player	January 17, 2021
Scottie Thompson	Sportsmanship Award	January 17, 2021
Arvin Tolentino	All-Rookie Team	February 25, 2021
Tim Cone	Outstanding Coach of the Bubble	March 5, 2021
