= 2020 San Miguel Beermen season =

- Head coach: Leo Austria
- Owners: San Miguel Brewery, Inc. (a San Miguel Corporation subsidiary)

Philippine Cup results
- Record: 7–4 (63.6%)
- Place: 4th
- Playoff finish: Quarterfinalist (lost to Meralco with twice-to-win advantage)

San Miguel Beermen seasons

The 2020 San Miguel Beermen season was the 45th season of the franchise in the Philippine Basketball Association (PBA).

== Key dates ==
- December 8: The 2019 PBA draft took place on Robinsons Place Manila.
- March 11: The PBA postpones the season due to the threat of the coronavirus.

== Draft picks ==
Round	Pick	Player	Position	Nationality	PBA D-League team	College
3	35	Travis Thompson	SG	United States		Alaska Anchorage
4	42	Daniel de Guzman	PF	Philippines	Batangas - EAC	NEUST
5	45	Von Tambeling	PG	Philippines	Wang's Basketball Couriers	Philippine Christian

== Roster ==
2020 San Miguel Beermen roster
Players
Coaches

Pos.	#	POB	Name	Height	Weight	DOB (YYYY–MM–DD)	From
F/C	2	(Philippines)	Billy Mamaril	6 ft 6 in (1.98 m)	225 lb (102 kg)	1980–06–25	Bakersfield
G/F	3	(Philippines)	Von Pessumal	6 ft 2 in (1.88 m)	185 lb (84 kg)	1993–02–12	Ateneo
G	4	(Philippines)	Gelo Alolino	6 ft 0 in (1.83 m)	185 lb (84 kg)	1994–01–04	National-U
G	5	(Philippines)	Alex Cabagnot	6 ft 0 in (1.83 m)	185 lb (84 kg)	1982–12–08	Hawaiʻi–Hilo
G	6	(United States)	Chris Ross	6 ft 2 in (1.88 m)	180 lb (82 kg)	1985–03–09	Marshall
G	7	(Philippines)	Terrence Romeo (injured)	5 ft 11 in (1.80 m)	178 lb (81 kg)	1992–03–16	Far Eastern
G	12	(Philippines)	Paul Zamar	5 ft 10 in (1.78 m)	179 lb (81 kg)	1987–10–20	UE
G/F	13	(United States)	Marcio Lassiter	6 ft 2 in (1.88 m)	185 lb (84 kg)	1987–05–16	Cal State Fullerton
C	15	(Philippines)	June Mar Fajardo (injured)	6 ft 10 in (2.08 m)	268 lb (122 kg)	1989–11–17	Cebu
G	18	(Philippines)	Louie Vigil (IN)	6 ft 3 in (1.91 m)	200 lb (91 kg)	1991–09–26	UST
F	20	(Philippines)	Daniel de Guzman	6 ft 4 in (1.93 m)	170 lb (77 kg)	1992–03–07	NEUST
G	21	(Philippines)	Wendell Comboy	6 ft 0 in (1.83 m)	170 lb (77 kg)	1997–07–21	Far Eastern
G/F	22	(Philippines)	Matt Ganuelas-Rosser (IN)	6 ft 5 in (1.96 m)	186 lb (84 kg)	1990–06–13	Cal Poly Pomona
F	27	(Philippines)	Riego Gamalinda	6 ft 3 in (1.91 m)	184 lb (83 kg)	1986–05–25	San Beda
F	29	(Philippines)	Arwind Santos (C)	6 ft 4 in (1.93 m)	175 lb (79 kg)	1981–06–10	Far Eastern
F/C	33	(United States)	Moala Tautuaa	6 ft 8 in (2.03 m)	245 lb (111 kg)	1989–04–30	Chadron State
F/C	88	(Philippines)	Russel Escoto	6 ft 6 in (1.98 m)	200 lb (91 kg)	1992–12–04	Far Eastern

Head coach

- (Philippines) Leo Austria

Assistant coach(es)

- (Philippines) Peter Martin (1st assistant)
- (Philippines) Ato Agustin
- (Philippines) Jorge Gallent

Team manager

- (Philippines) Gee Abanilla
- (Philippines) Daniel Henares (assistant)

Legend

- (C) Team captain
- (CI) Commissioner's Cup Import
- (GI) Governors' Cup Import
- (EI) EASL Import
- (DP) Unsigned draft pick
- (FA) Free agent
- (IN) Inactive
- (S) Suspended
- (R) Rookie
- Injured

Roster

== Philippine Cup ==
=== Eliminations ===
==== Standings ====
Pos	Team	W	L	PCT	GB	Qualification
1	Barangay Ginebra San Miguel	8	3	.727 (Note: Head-to-head record: Barangay Ginebra 1–0 Phoenix)	—	Twice-to-beat in quarterfinals
2	Phoenix Super LPG Fuel Masters	8	3	.727	—	Twice-to-beat in quarterfinals
3	TNT Tropang Giga	7	4	.636 (Note: Head-to-head quotient: TNT 1.074, San Miguel 1.023, Meralco 0.992, Alaska 0.959, Magnolia 0.955)	1	Twice-to-beat in quarterfinals
4	San Miguel Beermen	7	4	.636	1	Twice-to-beat in quarterfinals
5	Meralco Bolts	7	4	.636	1	Twice-to-win in quarterfinals
6	Alaska Aces	7	4	.636	1	Twice-to-win in quarterfinals
7	Magnolia Hotshots Pambansang Manok	7	4	.636	1	Twice-to-win in quarterfinals
8	Rain or Shine Elasto Painters	6	5	.545	2	Twice-to-win in quarterfinals
9	NLEX Road Warriors	5	6	.455	3	
10	Blackwater Elite	2	9	.182	6	
11	NorthPort Batang Pier	1	10	.091 (Note: Head-to-head record: NorthPort 1–0 Terrafirma)	7	
12	Terrafirma Dyip	1	10	.091	7	

Source: PBA.ph
Rules for classification: 1) winning percentage; 2) if two teams are tied, head to head record; if three or more teams are tied, head-to-head goal average (quotient), if tied for 8th, one-game playoff; 3) overall quotient 4) coin toss

==== Game log ====
2020 PBA Philippine Cup game log
Total: 7–4
March: 1–0

Game	Date	Opponent	Score	High points	High rebounds	High assists	Location Attendance	Record
1	March 8	Magnolia	W 94–78	Moala Tautuaa (20)	Arwind Santos (15)	Ross, Romeo (7)	Smart Araneta Coliseum	1–0

October: 3–2

Game	Date	Opponent	Score	High points	High rebounds	High assists	Location Attendance	Record
2	October 13	Rain or Shine	L 83–87	Marcio Lassiter (20)	Moala Tautuaa (11)	Tautuaa, Ross (5)	AUF Sports Arena & Cultural Center	1–1
3	October 16	TNT	L 88–107	Alex Cabagnot (15)	Arwind Santos (10)	Gelo Alolino (3)	AUF Sports Arena & Cultural Center	1–2
4	October 19	Terrafirma	W 105–98	Moala Tautuaa (25)	Arwind Santos (14)	Marcio Lassiter (7)	AUF Sports Arena & Cultural Center	2–2
5	October 24	Alaska	W 92–88	Alex Cabagnot (19)	Arwind Santos (10)	Ross, Tautuaa (6)	AUF Sports Arena & Cultural Center	3–2
6	October 28	Meralco	W 89–82	Moala Tautuaa (23)	Arwind Santos (11)	Chris Ross (4)	AUF Sports Arena & Cultural Center	4–2

November: 3–2

Game	Date	Opponent	Score	High points	High rebounds	High assists	Location Attendance	Record
7	November 3	Blackwater	W 90–88 OT	Moala Tautuaa (26)	Moala Tautuaa (26)	Alex Cabagnot (8)	AUF Sports Arena & Cultural Center	5–2
8	November 5	Phoenix Super LPG	L 103–110	Moala Tautuaa (21)	Arwind Santos (8)	Alex Cabagnot (8)	AUF Sports Arena & Cultural Center	5–3
9	November 6	NLEX	L 90–124	Paul Zamar (23)	Arwind Santos (5)	4 players (3)	AUF Sports Arena & Cultural Center	5–4
10	November 8	Ginebra	W 81–66	Moala Tautuaa (20)	Chris Ross (14)	Chris Ross (4)	AUF Sports Arena & Cultural Center	6–4
11	November 10	Northport	W 120–99	Arwind Santos (23)	Arwind Santos (11)	Marcio Lassiter (7)	AUF Sports Arena & Cultural Center	7–4

== Transactions ==
=== Trades ===
==== Preseason ====
January
January 9, 2020	To San Miguel Russel Escoto	To NorthPort Kelly Nabong

=== Free agency ===
==== Addition ====
Country	Player	Number	Position	Contract	Date signed	Former Team
(Philippines)	Gelo Alolino		Guard	1 year	—N/a	Blackwater
(Philippines)	Riego Gamalinda		Guard/forward	1 year	—N/a	Magnolia

==== Subtraction ====
Country	Player	Number	Position	Reason	New Team
(Philippines)	Ronald Tubid	71	Guard/forward	Contract not extended.	—N/a
(Philippines)	Yancy De Ocampo	95	Center	Retired	—N/a

=== Rookie Signings ===
Country	Player	Number	Position	Contract	Date signed	School/club team
(Philippines)	Wendelino Comboy III	--	Point guard			Far Eastern
