= Kelly Nabong =

Filipino-American basketball player

Personal information
- Born: November 17, 1988 (age 37) Solano County, California
- Listed height: 6 ft 6 in (1.98 m)
- Listed weight: 227 lb (103 kg)

Career information
- College: Santa Rosa JC
- PBA draft: 2012: 2nd round, 17th overall pick
- Drafted by: Rain or Shine Elasto Painters
- Playing career: 2012–present
- Position: Power forward / center

Career history
- 2012–2013: Meralco Bolts
- 2013–2015: GlobalPort Batang Pier
- 2015–2017: Meralco Bolts
- 2017–2018: GlobalPort Batang Pier
- 2018–2019: San Miguel Beermen
- 2020: NorthPort Batang Pier
- 2021–2022: Blackwater Bossing
- 2023–2024: Davao Occidental Tigers
- 2024–2025: Chichi Albayanos Wild Catz

Career highlights
- 2× PBA champion (2019 Philippine, 2019 Commissioner's)

Kelly Sean Nabong Berry (born November 17, 1988) is a Filipino-American basketball player who last played for the Chichi Albayanos Wild Cats of the Pilipinas Super League (PSL). He was selected 17th overall in the 2012 PBA draft by the Rain or Shine Elasto Painters. He would be later traded to the Meralco Bolts on draft night.

== Professional career ==
He was traded to GlobalPort as part of the Sol Mercado deal between Meralco and the GlobalPort.

On September 4, 2013, he was involved in a brawl in a game against San Mig Coffee Mixers. The scuffle ensued after teammate Marvin Hayes and San Mig import Marqus Blakely got tangled up. Blakely's teammate Joe Devance shoved Hayes down on the floor, then he pushed Blakely. Marc Pingris came into the scene and exchanged blows with him. He and Pingris were both suspended for two games and fined P60,000 each.

In May 2015, Nabong was traded by GlobalPort back to Meralco for John Wilson. The latter was later traded to NLEX Road Warriors for a 2016 second-round pick.

On June 21, 2018, Nabong was traded to the San Miguel Beermen for Gabby Espinas and SMB's 2020 second-round draft pick.

In January 2020, Nabong was traded back to NorthPort Batang Pier for Russel Escoto.

== PBA career statistics ==
Legend
GP	Games played	MPG	Minutes per game
FG%	Field-goal percentage	3P%	3-point field-goal percentage	FT%	Free-throw percentage
RPG	Rebounds per game	APG	Assists per game	SPG	Steals per game
BPG	Blocks per game	PPG	Points per game	**Bold**	Career high

As of the end of 2021 season

=== Season-by-season averages ===
Year	Team	GP	MPG	FG%	3P%	FT%	RPG	APG	SPG	BPG	PPG
2012–13	Meralco	20	14.0	**.507**	**.600**	.690	4.2	.3	.5	.2	4.6
2012–13	GlobalPort	20	14.0	**.507**	**.600**	.690	4.2	.3	.5	.2	4.6
2013–14	GlobalPort	21	18.2	.394	.000	.824	5.5	.8	.6	.2	5.4
2014–15	GlobalPort	23	15.6	.476	.000	**.842**	4.2	.7	.4	.2	4.2
2014–15	Meralco	23	15.6	.476	.000	**.842**	4.2	.7	.4	.2	4.2
2015–16	Meralco	40	14.1	.493	.250	.767	3.9	.5	.3	.2	4.6
2016–17	Meralco	36	14.8	.481	.286	.833	3.9	.5	.3	.3	4.4
2017–18	GlobalPort	**43**	21.5	.428	.317	.719	5.5	1.2	.6	.7	8.3
2017–18	San Miguel	**43**	21.5	.428	.317	.719	5.5	1.2	.6	.7	8.3
2019	San Miguel	40	10.9	.385	.318	.576	2.4	.6	.4	.3	3.3
2020	NorthPort	11	24.6	.404	.283	.750	5.2	**1.5**	.4	.4	**11.5**
2021	Blackwater	8	**29.3**	.361	.212	.613	**8.3**	1.3	**1.0**	**.9**	10.8
Career		242	16.5	.436	.302	.733	4.3	.8	.4	.3	5.6
