= 2020 Rain or Shine Elasto Painters season =

- Head coach: Caloy Garcia
- Owners: Asian Coatings Philippines, Inc.

Philippine Cup results
- Record: 6–5 (54.5%)
- Place: 8th
- Playoff finish: Quarterfinalist (lost to Barangay Ginebra with twice-to-win disadvantage)

Rain or Shine Elasto Painters seasons

The 2020 Rain or Shine Elasto Painters season was the 14th season of the franchise in the Philippine Basketball Association (PBA).

== Key dates ==
- December 8, 2019: The 2019 PBA draft took place in Midtown Atrium, Robinson Place Manila.
- March 11, 2020: The PBA postponed the season due to the threat of the coronavirus.

== Draft picks ==
=== Special draft ===
Round	Pick	Player	Position	Nationality	PBA D-League team	College
1	5	Mike Nieto	SF	Philippines	Cignal HD Hawkeyes	Ateneo

=== Regular draft ===
Round	Pick	Player	Position	Nationality	PBA D-League team	College
1	5	Adrian Wong	SG	Philippines	Cignal HD Hawkeyes	Ateneo
1	6	Clint Doliguez	SF	Philippines	Metropac Movers	San Beda
1	7	Prince Rivero	PF	Philippines		De La Salle
2	19	Vince Tolentino	PF/SF	Philippines	Go for Gold Scratchers	Ateneo
2	23	Wendell Comboy	SG	Philippines	Cha Dao Tea Place	Far Eastern
3	30	Luke Parcero	SG	Philippines	AMA Online Education Titans	Saint Francis of Assisi

== Roster ==
2020 Rain or Shine Elasto Painters roster
Players
Coaches

Pos.	#	POB	Name	Height	Weight	DOB (YYYY–MM–DD)	From
F	1	(Philippines)	Sidney Onwubere	6 ft 4 in (1.93 m)		1993–08–01	Emilio Aguinaldo
G	3	(Philippines)	Adrian Wong (R)	6 ft 3 in (1.91 m)		1996–02–09	Ateneo
F	5	(United States)	Gabe Norwood (C)	6 ft 6 in (1.98 m)	190 lb (86 kg)	1985–02–09	George Mason
G	6	(Philippines)	Rey Nambatac	6 ft 0 in (1.83 m)		1994–01–27	Letran
F	9	(Philippines)	Prince Rivero (R)			1995–02–19	De La Salle
F	10	(Philippines)	Javee Mocon	6 ft 3 in (1.91 m)	189 lb (86 kg)	1995–04–07	San Beda
G	11	(Philippines)	Kris Rosales	6 ft 0 in (1.83 m)	165 lb (75 kg)	1990–12–20	Hope International
F	12	(Philippines)	Vince Tolentino (R)			1993–08–27	Ateneo
F/C	15	(Philippines)	Jewel Ponferada	6 ft 5 in (1.96 m)	211 lb (96 kg)	1988–07–08	National-U
F	16	(Philippines)	Mark Borboran	6 ft 4 in (1.93 m)	185 lb (84 kg)	1984–11–20	UE
G/F	18	(Philippines)	James Yap (injured)	6 ft 3 in (1.91 m)	205 lb (93 kg)	1982–02–15	UE
G	19	(Philippines)	Clint Doliguez (R)	6 ft 1 in (1.85 m)	188 lb (85 kg)	1994–05–27	San Beda
G	25	(Philippines)	Ryan Araña	6 ft 2 in (1.88 m)	250 lb (113 kg)	1984–03–23	De La Salle
F/C	29	(Canada)	Norbert Torres	6 ft 6 in (1.98 m)	250 lb (113 kg)	1990–01–12	De La Salle
F/C	30	(Philippines)	Beau Belga	6 ft 5 in (1.96 m)	245 lb (111 kg)	1986–11–30	Philippine Christian

Head coach

- (Philippines) Caloy Garcia

Assistant coach(es)

- (Philippines) Chris Gavina (1st assistant)
- (Philippines) Mike Buendia
- (Philippines) Jireh Ibañes
- (Philippines) Ricky Umayam

Team manager

- (Philippines) Mamerto Mondragon
- (Philippines) Jay Legacion (assistant)

Legend

- (C) Team captain
- (CI) Commissioner's Cup Import
- (GI) Governors' Cup Import
- (EI) EASL Import
- (DP) Unsigned draft pick
- (FA) Free agent
- (IN) Inactive
- (S) Suspended
- (R) Rookie
- Injured

Roster

== Philippine Cup ==
=== Eliminations ===
==== Standings ====
Pos	Team	W	L	PCT	GB	Qualification
1	Barangay Ginebra San Miguel	8	3	.727 (Note: Head-to-head record: Barangay Ginebra 1–0 Phoenix)	—	Twice-to-beat in quarterfinals
2	Phoenix Super LPG Fuel Masters	8	3	.727	—	Twice-to-beat in quarterfinals
3	TNT Tropang Giga	7	4	.636 (Note: Head-to-head quotient: TNT 1.074, San Miguel 1.023, Meralco 0.992, Alaska 0.959, Magnolia 0.955)	1	Twice-to-beat in quarterfinals
4	San Miguel Beermen	7	4	.636	1	Twice-to-beat in quarterfinals
5	Meralco Bolts	7	4	.636	1	Twice-to-win in quarterfinals
6	Alaska Aces	7	4	.636	1	Twice-to-win in quarterfinals
7	Magnolia Hotshots Pambansang Manok	7	4	.636	1	Twice-to-win in quarterfinals
8	Rain or Shine Elasto Painters	6	5	.545	2	Twice-to-win in quarterfinals
9	NLEX Road Warriors	5	6	.455	3	
10	Blackwater Elite	2	9	.182	6	
11	NorthPort Batang Pier	1	10	.091 (Note: Head-to-head record: NorthPort 1–0 Terrafirma)	7	
12	Terrafirma Dyip	1	10	.091	7	

Source: PBA.ph
Rules for classification: 1) winning percentage; 2) if two teams are tied, head to head record; if three or more teams are tied, head-to-head goal average (quotient), if tied for 8th, one-game playoff; 3) overall quotient 4) coin toss

==== Game log ====
2020 PBA Philippine Cup game log
Total: 6–5
October: 4–1

Game	Date	Opponent	Score	High points	High rebounds	High assists	Location Attendance	Record
1	October 13	San Miguel	W 87–83	Javee Mocon (25)	Gabe Norwood (11)	Rey Nambatac (4)	AUF Sports Arena & Cultural Center	1–0
2	October 16	Terrafirma	W 91–82	Rey Nambatac (19)	Javee Mocon (10)	Gabe Norwood (4)	AUF Sports Arena & Cultural Center	2–0
3	October 18	NorthPort	W 70–68	Adrian Wong (15)	Beau Belga (7)	Rey Nambatac (6)	AUF Sports Arena & Cultural Center	3–0
4	October 22	Alaska	L 88–89	Sidney Onwubere (16)	Beau Belga (5)	Rey Nambatac (7)	AUF Sports Arena & Cultural Center	3–1
5	October 27	Ginebra	W 85–82	Beau Belga (20)	Beau Belga (10)	4 players (4)	AUF Sports Arena & Cultural Center	4–1

November: 2–4

Game	Date	Opponent	Score	High points	High rebounds	High assists	Location Attendance	Record
6	November 4	NLEX	L 74–94	Rey Nambatac (15)	Torres, Norwood (6)	Javee Mocon (4)	AUF Sports Arena & Cultural Center	4–2
7	November 5	Meralco	L 78–85	James Yap (18)	James Yap (7)	Gabe Norwood (3)	AUF Sports Arena & Cultural Center	4–3
8	November 7	Magnolia	L 62–70	Kris Rosales (14)	Javee Mocon (10)	4 players (2)	AUF Sports Arena & Cultural Center	4–4
9	November 8	Blackwater	W 82–71	Javee Mocon (19)	Javee Mocon (13)	5 players (2)	AUF Sports Arena & Cultural Center	5–4
10	November 10	TNT	W 80–74	Yap, Mocon (16)	Javee Mocon (10)	Beau Belga (4)	AUF Sports Arena & Cultural Center	6–4
11	November 11	Phoenix Super LPG	L 88–90	Ponferada, Mocon (13)	Norwood, Mocon (7)	Javee Mocon (4)	AUF Sports Arena & Cultural Center	6–5
