= Kevin Alas =

Filipino basketball player (born 1991)

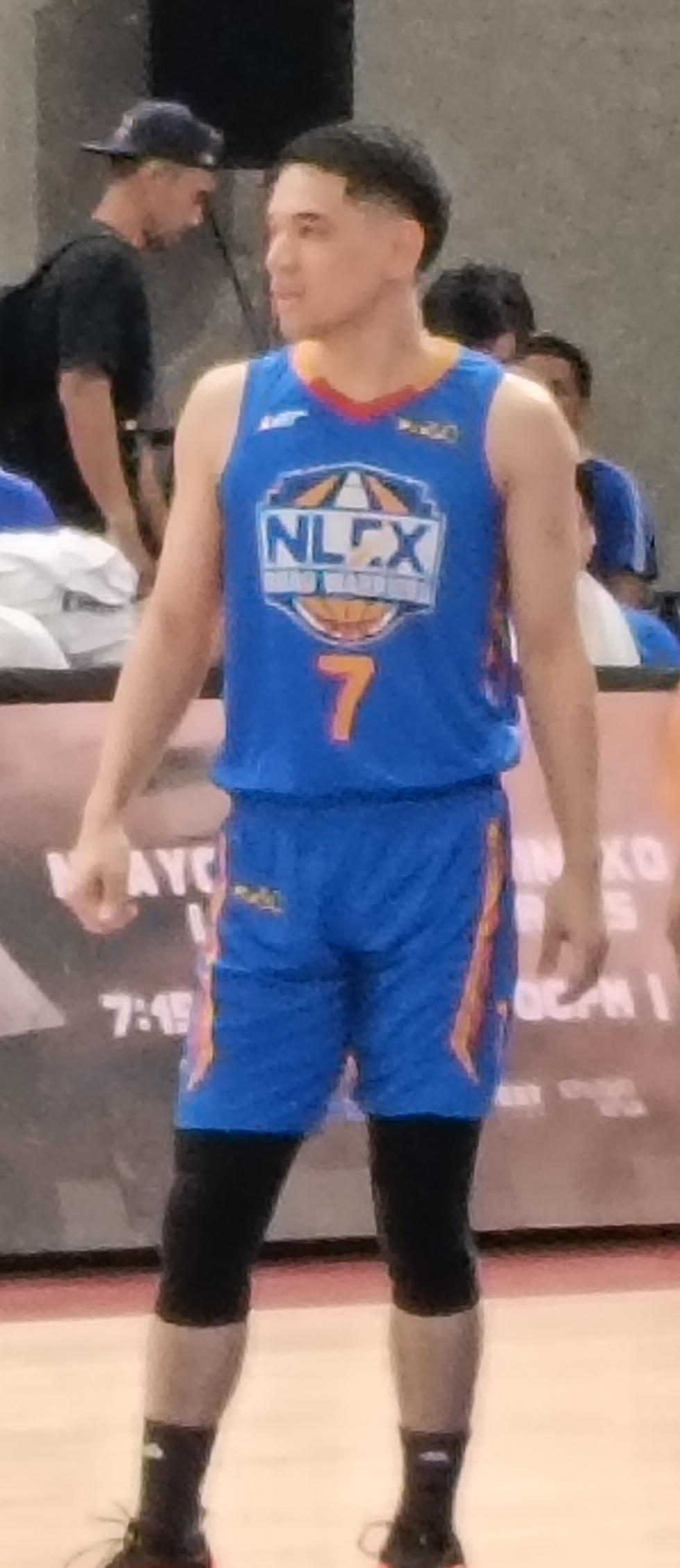
- Alas in 2025

No. 7 – NLEX Road Warriors
- Position: Point guard / shooting guard
- League: PBA

Personal information
- Born: November 13, 1991 (age 35) Las Piñas, Philippines
- Listed height: 6 ft 0 in (1.83 m)
- Listed weight: 170 lb (77 kg)

Career information
- High school: Letran (Manila)
- College: Letran
- PBA draft: 2014: 1st round, 2nd overall pick
- Drafted by: Rain or Shine Elasto Painters
- Playing career: 2014–present

Career history
- 2014–2015: Talk 'N Text Tropang Texters
- 2015–present: NLEX Road Warriors

Career highlights
- PBA champion (2015 Commissioner's); PBA All-Star (2023); 2× PBA Sportsmanship Award (2021, 2023); 2× NCAA Philippines Mythical Five (2011, 2012); 2× PBA D-League champion (2013 Aspirants', 2014 Foundation); PBA D-League Foundation Cup MVP (2014)

Kevin Louie Platon Alas (born November 13, 1991) is a Filipino professional basketball player for the NLEX Road Warriors of the Philippine Basketball Association (PBA). He was drafted second overall by the Rain or Shine Elasto Painters in the 2014 PBA draft.

== Early life and amateur career ==
Alas attended Grade School at Blessed Trinity School in Las Piñas and began playing organized basketball when he was in the 5th grade. The following year, he transferred to Letran where he would soon engage in more competitive tournaments. He would eventually make the Letran Squires lineup during his 2nd year in high school. Along with his brother, Junjun, and Mythical Five member John Noble, Kevin helped lead the Squires to the NCAA Juniors Finals in 2007 where they got swept in two games by a powerhouse San Sebastian Staglets team that featured Ryan Buenafe and Arvie Bringas. The following season, his last with the Squires, Letran made it back to the finals setting up a rematch with San Sebastian. But, once again, the Staglets dominated the Squires, sweeping them again to complete a historic four-peat and a perfect 14–0 record in the NCAA juniors division. But, despite two heartbreaking defeats, Kevin did not fail to impress talent scouts as a number of schools were interested in acquiring his services for the college game. Ironically, Alas trained with an old Letran rival, De La Salle University where he practiced for nearly two months before making his decision on which school to play for in college. Without any advice or influence from anybody, including his father, who gave him the free hand to select a school, Kevin personally decided that it would be best for him to stay with Letran.

He played his collegiate career with the Letran Knights and won two Mythical 5 selections in Seasons 87 and 88 then after losing to the San Beda Red Lions in the 2012 finals series, he elected to forgo his final playing year to join Gilas Pilipinas. During his time with Gilas, he was a key part of the team's gold medal finish in the 2013 SEA Games and a bronze medal finish in the 2014 FIBA Asia Cup.

He also played for the NLEX Road Warriors in the PBA D-League and led the team to several championships. By the time his D-League stint is over, he then decided to apply for 2014 PBA draft along with his elder brother, Junjun.

== Professional career ==
=== Talk 'N Text Tropang Texters (2014–2015) ===
Alas was drafted 2nd overall by the Rain or Shine Elasto Painters during the 2014 PBA draft, and signed a three-year deal with the team. He was groomed to take over the starting point guard spot since at that time when he was drafted, starting point guard Paul Lee requested to be traded to another team. However, when Lee decided to stay with Rain or Shine, Alas became expendable, thus they decided to trade him to NLEX for a 2015 first-round pick. He was traded once again, this time to NLEX's sister team Talk 'N Text Tropang Texters, in a deal that sent Niño Canaleta to the Road Warriors, with Blackwater Elite as conduit which acquired Larry Rodriguez and 2015 1st-round draft pick of Talk 'N Text Tropang Texters.

=== NLEX Road Warriors (2015–present) ===
On August 25, 2015, Alas, along with forward Rob Reyes, was traded by Talk 'N Text to Mahindra Enforcer in exchange for Troy Rosario. He was then quickly traded back to Talk 'N Text's sister team NLEX Road Warriors in exchange for forwards Niño Canaleta and Aldrech Ramos.

On September 1, 2020, Alas signed a three-year contract extension with the team. On September 14, 2023, he signed another three-year contract extension with the team.

== PBA career statistics ==
Legend
GP	Games played	MPG	Minutes per game	FG%	Field-goal percentage
3FG%	3-point field-goal percentage	4P%	4-point field-goal percentage	FT%	Free-throw percentage
RPG	Rebounds per game	APG	Assists per game	SPG	Steals per game
BPG	Blocks per game	PPG	Points per game	127	Career high

As of the end of 2024–25 season

=== Season-by-season averages ===
Year	Team	GP	MPG	FG%	3P%	4P%	FT%	RPG	APG	SPG	BPG	PPG
2014–15	Talk 'N Text	40	18.7	.398	.287	—	.644	1.9	1.8	.3	.2	6.5
2015–16	NLEX	35	26.2	.391	.292	—	.685	2.8	1.7	.5	.1	7.4
2016–17	NLEX	34	26.1	.443	.253	—	.579	3.9	2.6	.7	.2	11.6
2017–18	NLEX	18	24.7	.428	.286	—	.784	5.1	2.7	.8	.2	11.1
2019	NLEX	9	17.6	.293	.333	—	.636	2.2	2.6	.6	—	5.2
2020	NLEX	10	27.3	.444	.318	—	.818	6.3	4.2	.7	.1	16.2
2021	NLEX	30	30.6	.401	.221	—	.756	4.4	4.4	1.1	.3	14.2
2022–23	NLEX	35	30.1	.482	.371	—	.703	4.8	4.1	.9	.1	16.7
2023–24	NLEX	3	22.3	.500	.273	—	.529	3.3	2.7	1.0	—	12.0
2024–25	NLEX	23	18.2	.410	.354	.000	.520	1.8	2.1	.5	.0	7.6
Career		237	24.8	.424	.295	.000	.680	3.5	2.8	.7	.2	10.7

== National team career ==
In November 2017, Alas was named as part of the Gilas Pilipinas line-up that will compete at the 2019 FIBA World Cup qualifiers against Japan and Chinese Taipei. In February 2018, he was again included to compete against Australia and on their second meeting against Japan.

== Personal life ==
He is the second of four siblings. His father is his former coach in college, former Letran coach and former Phoenix Pulse Fuel Masters head coach and current Ateneo coach Louie Alas.

He is married to courtside reporter Selina Dagdag.
