= 2020 Phoenix Super LPG Fuel Masters season =

- Head coach: Topex Robinson (interim)
- Owner: Phoenix Petroleum Philippines, Inc.

Philippine Cup results
- Record: 8–3 (72.7%)
- Place: 2nd
- Playoff finish: Semifinalist (lost to TNT, 2–3)

Phoenix Super LPG Fuel Masters seasons

The 2020 Phoenix Super LPG Fuel Masters season was the 5th season of the franchise in the Philippine Basketball Association (PBA).

== Key dates ==
- December 8: The 2019 PBA draft took place in Midtown Atrium, Robinson Place Manila.
- March 11: The PBA postponed the season due to the threat of the coronavirus.

== Draft picks ==
Round	Pick	Player	Position	Nationality	PBA D-League team	College
3	28	Ralph Tansingco	F	Philippines	Zark's Jawbreakers	Lyceum
4	39	Spencer Pretta	G	Philippines	Zark's Jawbreakers	Lyceum
5	44	Jeffrey Santos	G	Philippines	Zark's Jawbreakers	Lyceum

== Roster ==
2020 Phoenix Super LPG Fuel Masters roster
Players
Coaches

Pos.	#	POB	Name	Height	Weight	DOB (YYYY–MM–DD)	From
G	0	(Philippines)	Brian Heruela	5 ft 10 in (1.78 m)	195 lb (88 kg)	1989–04–13	Cebu
G	1	(Philippines)	Mike Gamboa	5 ft 6 in (1.68 m)	170 lb (77 kg)	1989–02–26	UP Diliman
F	3	(United States)	Jason Perkins	6 ft 4 in (1.93 m)	235 lb (107 kg)	1992–09–20	De La Salle
F/C	4	(Philippines)	Jay-R Reyes	6 ft 7 in (2.01 m)	225 lb (102 kg)	1984–07–16	UP Diliman
F	7	(Philippines)	JC Intal	6 ft 4 in (1.93 m)	185 lb (84 kg)	1983–11–18	Ateneo
F	8	(Philippines)	Calvin Abueva	6 ft 2 in (1.88 m)	209 lb (95 kg)	1988–02–04	San Sebastian
F	9	(Philippines)	Jake Pascual (injured)	6 ft 4 in (1.93 m)	200 lb (91 kg)	1988–11–11	San Beda
G/F	11	(United States)	Alex Mallari	6 ft 4 in (1.93 m)	176 lb (80 kg)	1987–03–26	Lewis–Clark State
G	12	(Philippines)	RR Garcia	5 ft 11 in (1.80 m)	165 lb (75 kg)	1990–01–12	Far Eastern
G	13	(Philippines)	RJ Jazul	5 ft 11 in (1.80 m)	170 lb (77 kg)	1986–04–11	Letran
F	15	(Philippines)	Jorey Napoles	6 ft 4 in (1.93 m)		1993–11–27	TIP
C	18	(Philippines)	Justin Chua	6 ft 6 in (1.98 m)	232 lb (105 kg)	1989–07–13	Ateneo
F/C	22	(Philippines)	Dave Marcelo	6 ft 5 in (1.96 m)	223 lb (101 kg)	1989–02–22	San Beda
F	28	(Philippines)	Jansen Rios	6 ft 3 in (1.91 m)	185 lb (84 kg)	1991–10–28	Adamson
G/F	35	(Canada)	Matthew Wright (C)	6 ft 4 in (1.93 m)	200 lb (91 kg)	1992–02–07	St. Bonaventure

Head coach

- (Philippines) Topex Robinson

Assistant coach(es)

- (Philippines) Jamike Jarin (1st assistant)
- (Philippines) Jon Jacinto
- (Philippines) Kristofer Reyes
- (Philippines) Willy Wilson

Team manager

- (Philippines) Paolo Bugia

Legend

- (C) Team captain
- (CI) Commissioner's Cup Import
- (GI) Governors' Cup Import
- (EI) EASL Import
- (DP) Unsigned draft pick
- (FA) Free agent
- (IN) Inactive
- (S) Suspended
- (R) Rookie
- Injured

Roster

== Philippine Cup ==
=== Eliminations ===
==== Standings ====
Pos	Team	W	L	PCT	GB	Qualification
1	Barangay Ginebra San Miguel	8	3	.727 (Note: Head-to-head record: Barangay Ginebra 1–0 Phoenix)	—	Twice-to-beat in quarterfinals
2	Phoenix Super LPG Fuel Masters	8	3	.727	—	Twice-to-beat in quarterfinals
3	TNT Tropang Giga	7	4	.636 (Note: Head-to-head quotient: TNT 1.074, San Miguel 1.023, Meralco 0.992, Alaska 0.959, Magnolia 0.955)	1	Twice-to-beat in quarterfinals
4	San Miguel Beermen	7	4	.636	1	Twice-to-beat in quarterfinals
5	Meralco Bolts	7	4	.636	1	Twice-to-win in quarterfinals
6	Alaska Aces	7	4	.636	1	Twice-to-win in quarterfinals
7	Magnolia Hotshots Pambansang Manok	7	4	.636	1	Twice-to-win in quarterfinals
8	Rain or Shine Elasto Painters	6	5	.545	2	Twice-to-win in quarterfinals
9	NLEX Road Warriors	5	6	.455	3	
10	Blackwater Elite	2	9	.182	6	
11	NorthPort Batang Pier	1	10	.091 (Note: Head-to-head record: NorthPort 1–0 Terrafirma)	7	
12	Terrafirma Dyip	1	10	.091	7	

Source: PBA.ph
Rules for classification: 1) winning percentage; 2) if two teams are tied, head to head record; if three or more teams are tied, head-to-head goal average (quotient), if tied for 8th, one-game playoff; 3) overall quotient 4) coin toss

==== Game log ====
2020 PBA Philippine Cup game log
Total: 4–3
October: 4–3

Game	Date	Opponent	Score	High points	High rebounds	High assists	Location Attendance	Record
1	October 12	Meralco	W 116–98	Matthew Wright (36)	Jason Perkins (9)	Matthew Wright (6)	AUF Sports Arena & Cultural Center	1–0
2	October 15	NorthPort	W 110–105	Jason Perkins (31)	Jason Perkins (12)	Matthew Wright (9)	AUF Sports Arena & Cultural Center	2–0
3	October 19	TNT	L 91–110	Matthew Wright (31)	Jason Perkins (9)	JC Intal (5)	AUF Sports Arena & Cultural Center	2–1
4	October 21	Barangay Ginebra	L 71–86	Jason Perkins (15)	Jason Perkins (8)	Matthew Wright (6)	AUF Sports Arena & Cultural Center	2–2
5	October 23	Magnolia	W 91–84	Matthew Wright (23)	Jason Perkins (12)	JC Intal (5)	AUF Sports Arena & Cultural Center	3–2
6	October 26	NLEX	W 114–110	Matthew Wright (28)	Abueva, Perkins (13)	Calvin Abueva (7)	AUF Sports Arena & Cultural Center	4–2
7	October 29	Alaska	L 97–105	Matthew Wright (27)	Matthew Wright (9)	Calvin Abueva (5)	AUF Sports Arena & Cultural Center	4–3

==== Game log ====
Note: The PBA Board of Governors announced that games will be postponed for the meantime due to the coronavirus outbreak.

== Transactions ==
=== Free agent signings ===
Player	Date signed	Contract amount	Contract length	Former team
Jansen Rios	January 25, 2020	Not disclosed	One-year deal	NLEX Road Warriors
Jay-R Reyes	February 6, 2020	Not disclosed	One-year deal	Columbian Dyip

=== Trades ===
December 10, 2019	To Phoenix Super LPG Fuel Masters Jake Pascual	To Alaska Aces 2020 second-round pick
January 16, 2020	To Phoenix Super LPG Fuel Masters Brian Heruela	To Blackwater Elite Ron Dennison
January 20, 2020	To Phoenix Super LPG Fuel Masters Sol Mercado	To NorthPort Batang Pier LA Revilla Rey Guevarra
