= Paul Zamar =

Filipino basketball player (born 1987)

No. 48 – Batangas City Athletics
- Position: Shooting guard / point guard
- League: MPBL

Personal information
- Born: October 20, 1987 (age 39) Mandaluyong, Philippines
- Listed height: 5 ft 10 in (1.78 m)
- Listed weight: 179 lb (81 kg)

Career information
- High school: San Beda (Manila); UE (Caloocan)
- College: UE
- PBA draft: 2012: 4th round, 35th overall pick
- Drafted by: Barangay Ginebra San Miguel
- Playing career: 2016–present

Career history
- 2016–2017: Mono Thewphaingarm
- 2017–2018: Mono Vampire
- 2018: Blackwater Elite
- 2019–2022: San Miguel Beermen
- 2023–2024: NorthPort Batang Pier
- 2025–2026: Blackwater Bossing
- 2026–present: Batangas City Athletics

Career highlights
- 3× PBA champion (2019 Philippine, 2019 Commissioner's, 2022 Philippine); PBA Sportsmanship Award (2024); PBA All-Rookie Team (2018)

Paul Christian Zamar (born October 20, 1987) is a Filipino professional basketball player for the Batangas City Athletics of the Maharlika Pilipinas Basketball League (MPBL).

On January 5, 2023, while still being a restricted free agent, Zamar was traded to the NorthPort Batang Pier for Allyn Bulanadi and San Miguel's 2025 second-round pick. Zamar signed a one-year contract with NorthPort on January 17. He signed another one-year contract extension with the Batang Pier on June 7, 2024.

== PBA career statistics ==
Legend
GP	Games played	MPG	Minutes per game
FG%	Field-goal percentage	3P%	3-point field-goal percentage	FT%	Free-throw percentage
RPG	Rebounds per game	APG	Assists per game	SPG	Steals per game
BPG	Blocks per game	PPG	Points per game	**Bold**	Career high

As of the end of 2023–24 season

=== Season-by-season averages ===
Year	Team	GP	MPG	FG%	3P%	FT%	RPG	APG	SPG	BPG	PPG
2017–18	Blackwater	19	**22.8**	.442	.378	.773	**3.6**	**1.5**	**.6**	**.1**	**10.3**
2019	San Miguel	23	7.9	.316	.207	.400	1.3	1.0	.2	.0	2.1
2020	San Miguel	13	14.4	**.467**	.385	.571	2.0	.9	.2	**.1**	6.0
2021	San Miguel	16	7.3	.417	.350	**.833**	.8	.4	.1	—	2.6
2022–23	San Miguel	**32**	12.0	.439	.358	.791	1.2	1.2	.2	**.1**	5.0
2022–23	NorthPort	**32**	12.0	.439	.358	.791	1.2	1.2	.2	**.1**	5.0
2023–24	NorthPort	18	18.5	.444	**.403**	.667	1.4	1.4	**.6**	**.1**	7.9
Career		121	13.5	.429	.360	.698	1.7	1.1	.3	.1	5.5

== Personal life ==
He is a son of former national team head coach Boyzie Zamar.
