= Gabe Norwood =

Filipino-American basketball player

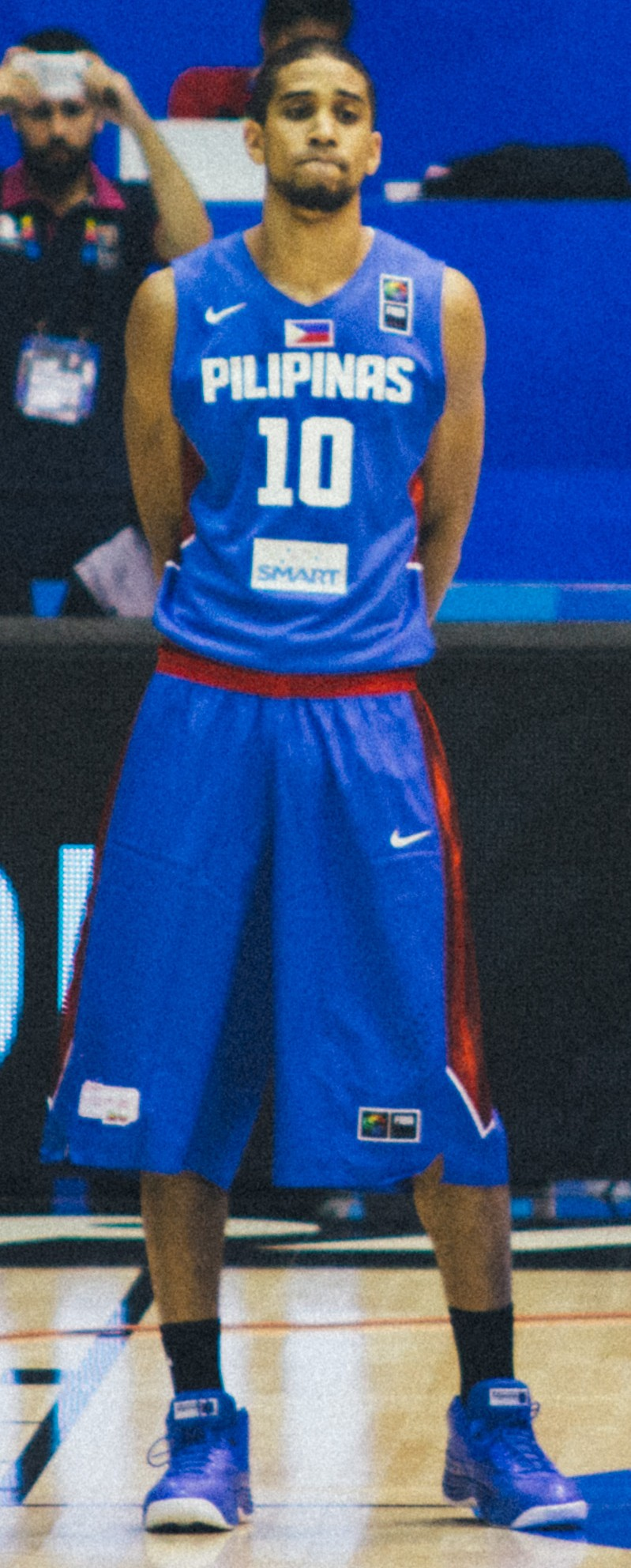
- Norwood in 2014

Personal information
- Born: February 9, 1985 (age 41) Fayetteville, North Carolina, U.S.
- Listed height: 6 ft 6 in (1.98 m)
- Listed weight: 190 lb (86 kg)

Career information
- High school: State College Area (State College, Pennsylvania)
- College: George Mason (2003–2007)
- PBA draft: 2008: 1st round1st overall
- Drafted by: Rain or Shine Elasto Painters
- Playing career: 2008–2025
- Coaching career: 2024–2025

Career history

Playing
- 2008–2025: Rain or Shine Elasto Painters

Coaching
- 2024–2025: Rain or Shine Elasto Painters (assistant)

Career highlights
- 2× PBA champion (2012 Governors' Cup, 2016 Commissioner's); 11× PBA All-Star (2009–2016, 2018, 2019, 2024); PBA All-Star Game Most Valuable Player (2010); PBA Mythical Second Team (2009); PBA Defensive Player of the Year (2010); 7× PBA All-Defensive Team (2010, 2013–2018); PBA Rookie of the Year (2009); PBA All-Rookie Team (2009); 3× PBA Sportsmanship Award (2017–2019); PBA Slam Dunk Champion (Locals Division) (2009); No. 5 retired by Rain or Shine Elasto Painters; PBL Mythical First Team (2007-08 Season)

Gabriel Daniel Viloria Norwood (born February 9, 1985) is a Filipino-American former professional basketball player and coach. He played his whole professional career for the Rain or Shine Elasto Painters of the Philippine Basketball Association (PBA).

Norwood played at State College Area High School in high school, then jumped to George Mason University for his collegiate career. In 2008, Norwood was selected first overall by the Rain or Shine Elasto Painters in the 2008 PBA draft. He won two PBA championships, won Defensive Player of the Year in 2010, and earned seven All-Defensive Team selections, all while playing for the Elasto Painters.

In the 2024–25 PBA season, Norwood also took on the role of Rain or Shine assistant coach. In October 2025, he announced his retirement that would come after the 2025–26 PBA Philippine Cup. He played his final game on December 29, 2025.

He has also played for the Philippines national basketball team in international competitions.

== High school and college career ==
Norwood spent his life in many different parts of the United States while his father, Brian Norwood, now defensive coordinator at UCLA, coached different collegiate football teams. In high school, he and his brother (Jordan Norwood, a former football player at Penn State where his father coached until 2007) were part of the state championship team at State College Area High School in State College, Pennsylvania.

Norwood was part of the 2005–06 George Mason Patriots men's basketball team's Final Four run as their sixth man. He played 35 games averaging 3.5 points per game, 2.1 rebounds per game, 2.0 assists per game, 1.0 steals per game, 42.5 FG%, 58.8FT% in 21.1 mins/game.

== Professional career ==
=== Rain or Shine Elasto Painters (2008–2025) ===
Norwood was the first overall pick in the 2008 PBA Draft by the Rain or Shine Elasto Painters. During the 2009 PBA All-Star Week, Norwood won in the Slam Dunk Contest among locals. He failed to beat the 2006 NCAA Slam Dunk Champion and Barangay Ginebra Kings import, David Noel, who won the same contest but among the imports. He won the 2008–09 PBA Rookie of the Year Award for his promising performance inside the court. He was also named into the Second Mythical Team.

In the 2010 All-Star Game in Puerto Princesa, Norwood won the Handy Fix All-Star Game MVP for his highlight dunks and moves and also because of his baskets in the critical moments of the game. He had 17 points, 5 rebounds, 4 assists, 2 steals, and a block. He led the North All-Stars to a 133–130 win over the South All-Stars. He finished that season as a member of the All-Defensive Team, and became Defensive Player of the Year.

In 2011, he agreed to an P8.4 million two-year contract-extension deal. The following year, he won his first championship during the Governors' Cup.

In Game 3 of the 2012-13 Philippine Cup quarterfinals, Norwood stepped up with 21 points and 6 assists to eliminate Ginebra and move on to the semis. They made it all the way to the finals, where they lost to the Talk 'N Text Tropang Texters. The next conference, which was the Commissioner's Cup, Rain or Shine went on a 5-game winning streak, but it was snapped by Talk 'N Text, which was their sixth straight loss to that team. They lost to Ginebra in the quarterfinals that conference. In the quarterfinals against the Globalport Batang Pier in the Governors' Cup, he hit a corner three with 17.8 seconds left that eventually sent Rain or Shine to the semifinals. In the semis, Rain or Shine lost to the Petron Blaze Boosters. He finished his season a member of the All-Defensive Team.

In their matchup against the Barako Bull Energy in the 2013-14 Philippine Cup, Norwood stole a pass for Mick Pennisi and made two free throws to seal the win for Rain or Shine. They made it to the finals that year, along with the San Mig Super Coffee Mixers. In Game 1, he made an alley-oop pass to Paul Lee with 0.9 seconds remaining that gave Rain or Shine the lead. Lee then sealed the win with a technical free throw when San Mig sued for time without any timeouts left. San Mig eventually won the series in the next five games. They rematched again in the Governors' Cup finals. But it was the same result, as San Mig won the series, capturing the first Grand Slam since the Alaska Aces did it in 1996.

Once again Rain Or Shine made another finals stint in the 2015 Commissioner's Cup going up against Talk 'N Text but they failed to secure the championship on their belt after a competitive second overtime in Game 7. TNT was led by Jayson Castro who was named the Best Player of the Conference and Ranidel de Ocampo who was named the Finals MVP.

Norwood won his second title during the 2016 Commissioner's Cup. On October 14, 2016, he was recognized during the PBA Leo Awards Night as he was named to the All-Defensive Team. He also re-signed with the team for two more years.

Norwood missed some time the next season due to a viral infection. Unfortunately, they were not able to defend their Commissioner's Cup title. In his first game of the Governors' Cup after playing for the national team in the 2017 FIBA Asia Cup, he had 15 points and 11 rebounds while playing 37 minutes in a win against the Star Hotshots. Several weeks later, he scored 17 points in a win against the Phoenix Fuel Masters. Rain or Shine was eliminated in the quarterfinals by the San Miguel Beermen. He was given the Sportsmanship Award and was on the All-Defensive Team.

In 2018, Norwood was once again on the All-Defensive Team, which was his sixth straight inclusion.

In 2021, Norwood made three of his four three-point attempts as he finished with 15 points that helped Rain or Shine beat the Terrafirma Dyip. Norwood and his team didn't have a very successful season, as Rain or Shine was eliminated in the quarterfinals of the Philippine Cup by Magnolia, and didn't make the playoffs of the Governors' Cup.

In 2023, Norwood reached the 5,000 points milestone in a win over TNT in which they qualified for the 2023–24 Commissioner's Cup playoffs. There, they were eliminated by San Miguel.

On October 9, 2025, Norwood announced that he would retire after the 2025–26 PBA Philippine Cup. On December 29, 2025, he officially retired after Rain or Shine was eliminated by the Meralco Bolts in a do-or-die game of the quarterfinal round, 98–89.

== Career statistics ==
=== PBA ===
Legend
GP	Games played	MPG	Minutes per game	FG%	Field-goal percentage
3FG%	3-point field-goal percentage	4P%	4-point field-goal percentage	FT%	Free-throw percentage
RPG	Rebounds per game	APG	Assists per game	SPG	Steals per game
BPG	Blocks per game	PPG	Points per game	**127**	Career high

As of the end of 2024–25 season

==== Season-by-season averages ====
Year	Team	GP	MPG	FG%	3P%	4P%	FT%	RPG	APG	SPG	BPG	PPG
2008–09	Rain or Shine	44	36.4	.394	.269	—	.583	**8.0**	3.5	1.2	.6	11.5
2009–10	Rain or Shine	51	**38.6**	**.422**	.287	—	.727	6.7	**3.8**	1.4	.7	**13.8**
2010–11	Rain or Shine	40	32.3	.371	.336	—	.669	6.3	**3.8**	1.3	.6	10.2
2011–12	Rain or Shine	53	29.6	.396	.294	—	.644	6.1	3.3	.9	.5	8.7
2012–13	Rain or Shine	56	27.8	.357	.215	—	.635	5.3	2.8	1.1	.6	7.4
2013–14	Rain or Shine	**58**	26.4	.387	.213	—	.643	4.3	2.5	1.0	.4	7.8
2014–15	Rain or Shine	53	26.6	.374	.323	—	.509	4.0	2.1	1.0	.3	7.4
2015–16	Rain or Shine	54	24.1	.394	.327	—	.727	4.4	1.8	1.0	.3	7.2
2016–17	Rain or Shine	36	28.5	.395	.273	—	.716	5.6	2.2	1.4	.4	8.0
2017–18	Rain or Shine	40	30.5	.348	.253	—	.543	6.3	2.8	1.4	.3	8.2
2019	Rain or Shine	48	29.2	.335	.267	—	.633	4.9	2.2	1.3	.5	6.6
2020	Rain or Shine	12	31.1	.256	.119	—	**.917**	5.8	1.8	**1.5**	**1.0**	4.8
2021	Rain or Shine	24	29.8	.325	.213	—	.611	4.9	2.8	.9	.5	4.3
2022–23	Rain or Shine	30	22.9	.357	.289	—	.533	3.0	2.4	.9	.1	4.9
2023–24	Rain or Shine	26	17.7	.305	.200	—	.783	3.0	1.6	.7	.4	3.3
2024–25	Rain or Shine	49	16.8	.353	**.375**	.000	.634	3.5	1.3	.4	.2	3.9
Career		674	28.1	.374	.275	.000	.648	5.2	2.6	1.1	.5	7.8

=== National team ===
Year	Team	GP	MPG	FG%	3P%	FT%	RPG	APG	SPG	BPG	PPG
2007 FIBA Asia Championship	Philippines	7	23.0	**.488**	.250	**.810**	4.7	1.7	1.1	0.4	8.3
2009 FIBA Asia Championship	Philippines	**9**	16.0	.400	.333	.524	2.6	1.2	1.3	0.2	6.2
2012 William Jones Cup	Philippines	8	26.8	.397	**.571**	.722	**5.1**	**2.8**	0.5	0.5	**9.9**
2012 FIBA Asia Cup	Philippines	7	25.2	.458	.167	.400	5.0	0.9	1.0	0.3	7.1
2013 FIBA Asia Championship	Philippines	**9**	27.0	.474	.375	.591	4.0	1.7	0.8	1.0	6.1
2014 FIBA World Cup	Philippines	5	**31.8**	.344	.133	.500	3.0	1.0	1.0	0.2	5.2
2015 FIBA Asia Championship	Philippines	**9**	25.6	.324	.211	.500	3.7	1.3	**1.6**	0.8	3.4
2017 FIBA Asia Cup	Philippines	6	26.8	.423	.333	.667	4.7	2.8	1.5	**1.2**	5.0

=== NCAA ===
Legend
GP	Games played	GS	Games started	MPG	Minutes per game
FG%	Field goal percentage	3P%	3-point field goal percentage	FT%	Free throw percentage
RPG	Rebounds per game	APG	Assists per game	SPG	Steals per game
BPG	Blocks per game	PPG	Points per game	**Bold**	Career high

Year	Team	GP	GS	MPG	FG%	3P%	FT%	RPG	APG	SPG	BPG	PPG
2003–04	George Mason University	29	1	8.4	.306	.308	.500	.8	.7	.3	.1	1.0
2004–05	George Mason University	29	**24**	**26.3**	.438	.133	.672	**3.6**	**2.5**	**1.6**	.5	**5.6**
2005–06	George Mason University	**35**	3	21.1	.425	.375	.588	2.1	2.0	1.0	**.7**	3.5
2006–07	George Mason University	33	9	18.7	**.465**	**.382**	**.706**	2.3	1.9	.8	.2	3.9

== National team career ==
Norwood was a member of the national basketball team of the Philippines that represented the country in the 2007 William Jones Cup, and in the FIBA Asia Championship 2007.

In 2008, Norwood was again named to the Philippine Training Pool headed by Coach Yeng Guiao for future international competitions. He saw action and his team finished 8th overall in the 2009 FIBA Asia Championship held in Tianjin, China on August 6–16, 2009.

Norwood once again joined the national team in 2013, this time under the second incarnation of the Smart-Gilas program. His athleticism and versatility on both sides of the floor was a great asset in the team's run to a silver medal finish in the FIBA Asia Men's Championship, hosted in the Philippines.

Norwood rejoined the national team for the 2014 FIBA Basketball World Cup in Spain. He went viral during the tournament for his dunk over Argentinian NBA player Luis Scola. In 2020, it was one of 32 dunks nominated by FIBA for its Dunk of the Decade.

He was also included in the final 12 during the 2015 FIBA Asia Championship wherein they took the second place after losing to China in the finals game. He also took part in the Olympics Qualifying Tournament, losing both games to France and New Zealand in the preliminary round and failing to advance in the knockout-round.

Norwood also played in 2017 FIBA Asia Cup in Lebanon and was the team captain for the 2019 FIBA World Cup Asian Qualifiers and World Cup.

== Player profile ==
Norwood is known as an athletic wing who is a playmaker and defender. Chot Reyes, the national team coach, saw Norwood as "...an athletic player and a tall utility man. The 6’5”/6'6" guard we never had, who could guard the opponent's best wingman, be a playmaker and fastbreak finisher”. He is also known for his energy and hustle.

He is also known for being committed to the national team and for only staying with Rain or Shine for his whole professional career.

== Personal life ==
Gabe is the brother of former Denver Broncos wide receiver Jordan Norwood. He has two other brothers: Levi and Zach, and one sister. His father is Brian Norwood, former co-defensive coordinator and safeties coach with the Navy Midshipmen football. He is also the cousin of Alohi Robins-Hardy, a professional volleyball player who plays in the PVL and member of the Philippines women's national volleyball team.

Gabe and his wife Lei (née Feranil) were married in 2013. They have three sons: Cassius, Orion, and Idris.

Norwood is also friends with multiple Fil-Am basketball players, including former teammate Sol Mercado, Chris Ross, Joe Devance, and NBA player Jordan Clarkson. He, Mercado, Devance, Jared Dillinger, and Tin Gamboa have a podcast together, Let it Fly.

Norwood is often called 'Mr. President' because of his striking resemblance to former US president Barack Obama and his leadership skills.

In 2019, Norwood, with the help of a Japanese company, created his own manga, Cager Clash. He also has a restaurant, the Naxional South American Diner, and an online food delivery service.

Norwood was also a columnist for the Philippine edition of NBA.com.
