= 2020 Meralco Bolts season =

- Head coach: Norman Black
- Owners: Manila Electric Company (an MVP Group subsidiary)

Philippine Cup results
- Record: 7–4 (63.6%)
- Place: 5th
- Playoff finish: Semifinalist (lost to Barangay Ginebra, 2–3)

Meralco Bolts seasons

The 2020 Meralco Bolts season was the 10th season of the franchise in the Philippine Basketball Association (PBA).

== Key dates ==
- December 8, 2019: The 2019 PBA draft took place in Midtown Atrium, Robinson Place Manila.
- March 11, 2020: The PBA postponed the season due to the threat of the coronavirus.
- April 13, 2020: After playing two seasons with the franchise, long-time national team player Ranidel de Ocampo announces his retirement from professional basketball.

== Draft picks ==
Round	Pick	Player	Position	Nationality	PBA D-League team	College
2	18	Aaron Black	SG	Philippines	AMA Online Education Titans	Ateneo
3	29	Mike Cañete	PF	Philippines	The Masterpiece / CD14 Designs-Trinity	Arellano

== Roster ==
2020 Meralco Bolts roster
Players
Coaches

Pos.	#	POB	Name	Height	Weight	DOB (YYYY–MM–DD)	From
F/C	00	(Philippines)	Bryan Faundo	6 ft 6 in (1.98 m)	225 lb (102 kg)	1984–02–18	Letran
G	1	(Philippines)	Aaron Black (R)			1996–12–03	Ateneo
G	2	(United States)	Trevis Jackson	5 ft 11 in (1.80 m)	171 lb (78 kg)	–09–13	Sacramento State
F	6	(Philippines)	Raymar Jose	6 ft 4 in (1.93 m)	210 lb (95 kg)	1992–08–06	Far Eastern
F	7	(United States)	Cliff Hodge	6 ft 4 in (1.93 m)	195 lb (88 kg)	1988–02–03	Reedley
F	8	(Philippines)	Nico Salva	6 ft 3 in (1.91 m)	194 lb (88 kg)	1990–03–08	Ateneo
G	9	(Philippines)	Baser Amer	6 ft 0 in (1.83 m)	170 lb (77 kg)	1992–09–29	San Beda
G	10	(Philippines)	John Pinto	5 ft 10 in (1.78 m)	195 lb (88 kg)	1990–10–15	Arellano
G/F	11	(United States)	Chris Newsome	6 ft 2 in (1.88 m)	190 lb (86 kg)	1990–06–25	Ateneo
G	17	(Philippines)	Anjo Caram	5 ft 7 in (1.70 m)	159 lb (72 kg)	1991–01–14	San Beda
F	19	(Philippines)	Bong Quinto	6 ft 1 in (1.85 m)		1994–12–15	Letran
C	20	(Philippines)	Raymond Almazan	6 ft 8 in (2.03 m)	194 lb (88 kg)	1989–08–02	Letran
F	21	(Philippines)	Reynel Hugnatan (C)	6 ft 4 in (1.93 m)	210 lb (95 kg)	1978–11–03	Manila
F	22	(Philippines)	Allein Maliksi	6 ft 4 in (1.93 m)	180 lb (82 kg)	1987–09–18	UST
F	81	(Philippines)	Jammer Jamito (IN)	6 ft 5 in (1.96 m)	190 lb (86 kg)	1990–09–01	St. Clare

Head coach

- (United States) Norman Black

Assistant coach(es)

- (Philippines) Ronnie Magsanoc (1st Assistant)
- (Philippines) Gene Afable
- (Philippines) Patrick Fran
- (Philippines) Christopher Tan
- (Philippines) Luigi Trillo

Team manager

- (Philippines) Paolo Trillo

Legend

- (C) Team captain
- (CI) Commissioner's Cup Import
- (GI) Governors' Cup Import
- (EI) EASL Import
- (DP) Unsigned draft pick
- (FA) Free agent
- (IN) Inactive
- (S) Suspended
- (R) Rookie
- Injured

Roster

== Philippine Cup ==
=== Eliminations ===
==== Standings ====
Pos	Team	W	L	PCT	GB	Qualification
1	Barangay Ginebra San Miguel	8	3	.727 (Note: Head-to-head record: Barangay Ginebra 1–0 Phoenix)	—	Twice-to-beat in quarterfinals
2	Phoenix Super LPG Fuel Masters	8	3	.727	—	Twice-to-beat in quarterfinals
3	TNT Tropang Giga	7	4	.636 (Note: Head-to-head quotient: TNT 1.074, San Miguel 1.023, Meralco 0.992, Alaska 0.959, Magnolia 0.955)	1	Twice-to-beat in quarterfinals
4	San Miguel Beermen	7	4	.636	1	Twice-to-beat in quarterfinals
5	Meralco Bolts	7	4	.636	1	Twice-to-win in quarterfinals
6	Alaska Aces	7	4	.636	1	Twice-to-win in quarterfinals
7	Magnolia Hotshots Pambansang Manok	7	4	.636	1	Twice-to-win in quarterfinals
8	Rain or Shine Elasto Painters	6	5	.545	2	Twice-to-win in quarterfinals
9	NLEX Road Warriors	5	6	.455	3	
10	Blackwater Elite	2	9	.182	6	
11	NorthPort Batang Pier	1	10	.091 (Note: Head-to-head record: NorthPort 1–0 Terrafirma)	7	
12	Terrafirma Dyip	1	10	.091	7	

Source: PBA.ph
Rules for classification: 1) winning percentage; 2) if two teams are tied, head to head record; if three or more teams are tied, head-to-head goal average (quotient), if tied for 8th, one-game playoff; 3) overall quotient 4) coin toss

==== Game log ====
2020 PBA Philippine Cup game log
Total: 7–4
October: 3–3

Game	Date	Opponent	Score	High points	High rebounds	High assists	Location Attendance	Record
1	October 12	Phoenix Super LPG	L 98–116	Reynel Hugnatan (16)	Raymar Jose (10)	Chris Newsome (5)	AUF Sports Arena & Cultural Center	0–1
2	October 14	Alaska	W 93–81	Allein Maliksi (17)	Reynel Hugnatan (8)	Chris Newsome (5)	AUF Sports Arena & Cultural Center	1–1
3	October 18	Barangay Ginebra	L 91–105	Allein Maliksi (18)	Reynel Hugnatan (7)	Baser Amer (6)	AUF Sports Arena & Cultural Center	1–2
4	October 20	Magnolia	W 109–104 OT	Chris Newsome (23)	Cliff Hodge (9)	Chris Newsome (6)	AUF Sports Arena & Cultural Center	2–2
5	October 23	NLEX	W 101–92	Chris Newsome (18)	Raymond Almazan (9)	Chris Newsome (6)	AUF Sports Arena & Cultural Center	3–2
6	October 28	San Miguel	L 82–89	Baser Amer (17)	Newsome, Black (8)	Chris Newsome (6)	AUF Sports Arena & Cultural Center	3–3

November: 4–1

Game	Date	Opponent	Score	High points	High rebounds	High assists	Location Attendance	Record
7	November 4	Blackwater	W 89–85	Chris Newsome (19)	Raymond Almazan (10)	Bong Quinto (6)	AUF Sports Arena & Cultural Center	4–3
8	November 5	Rain or Shine	W 85–78	Chris Newsome (17)	Almazan, Black (9)	Baser Amer (7)	AUF Sports Arena & Cultural Center	5–3
9	November 7	TNT	L 79–92	Chris Newsome (17)	Raymond Almazan (9)	Newsome, Hugnatan (4)	AUF Sports Arena & Cultural Center	5–4
10	November 8	Terrafirma	W 95–93	Raymond Almazan (15)	Raymond Almazan (10)	Cliff Hodge (5)	AUF Sports Arena & Cultural Center	6–4
11	November 11	NorthPort	W 80–73	Bong Quinto (14)	Jammer Jamito (12)	Baser Amer (7)	AUF Sports Arena & Cultural Center	7–4
