= 2020 Blackwater Elite season =

- Head coach: Nash Racela
- Owner(s): Ever Bilena Cosmetics, Inc.

Philippine Cup results
- Record: 2–9 (18.2%)
- Place: 10th
- Playoff finish: Did not qualify

Blackwater Elite seasons

The 2020 Blackwater Elite season was the 6th season of the franchise in the Philippine Basketball Association (PBA).

== Key dates ==
- December 8: The 2019 PBA draft took place on Robinsons Place Manila.
- March 11: The PBA postpones the season due to the threat of the coronavirus.

== Draft picks ==
=== Special draft ===
Pick	Player	Position	Nationality	PBA D-League team	College
2	Rey Suerte	SG	Philippines	Che'Lu Bar & Grill Revellers	UE

=== Regular draft ===
Round	Pick	Player	Position	Nationality	PBA D-League team	College
1	2	Maurice Shaw	C	Philippines		Hutchinson CC
2	14	Richard Escoto	PF	Philippines	Phoenix Accelerators	Far Eastern
3	25	Chris Bitoon	PG	Philippines	Go for Gold Scratchers	St. Clare
4	37	Hubert Cani	PG	Philippines	Cha Dao Tea Place	Far Eastern

== Roster ==
2020 Blackwater Elite roster
Players
Coaches

Pos.	#	POB	Name	Height	Weight	DOB (YYYY–MM–DD)	From
G	5	(Philippines)	Diego Dario	5 ft 8 in (1.73 m)	145 lb (66 kg)	1997–01–06	UP Diliman
G	6	(Philippines)	Roi Sumang	5 ft 8 in (1.73 m)	155 lb (70 kg)	1990–12–12	UE
F	7	(Philippines)	Don Trollano	6 ft 3 in (1.91 m)	182 lb (83 kg)	1992–01–07	Adamson
G	8	(Philippines)	Ed Daquioag	6 ft 1 in (1.85 m)	170 lb (77 kg)	1991–08–18	UST
F	9	(Philippines)	KG Canaleta (C)	6 ft 6 in (1.98 m)	200 lb (91 kg)	1982–02–12	UE
F/C	10	(Philippines)	Frank Golla	6 ft 5 in (1.96 m)	290 lb (132 kg)	1990–01–17	Ateneo
F	12	(Philippines)	Mac Belo	6 ft 4 in (1.93 m)	185 lb (84 kg)	1993–02–12	Far Eastern
G	13	(Philippines)	Mike Tolomia	5 ft 11 in (1.80 m)	170 lb (77 kg)	1993–01–06	Far Eastern
G	18	(Philippines)	Paul Desiderio	5 ft 10 in (1.78 m)	150 lb (68 kg)	1997–02–02	UP Diliman
C	19	(Philippines)	Maurice Shaw (R)	6 ft 9 in (2.06 m)	260 lb (118 kg)	1985–01–08	Hutchinson CC
F/C	22	(Philippines)	Marion Magat	6 ft 7 in (2.01 m)	180 lb (82 kg)	1989–10–22	National-U
F	23	(Philippines)	Richard Escoto (R)	6 ft 3 in (1.91 m)	204 lb (93 kg)	1997–03–21	Far Eastern
F	35	(United States)	Matt Salem	6 ft 3 in (1.91 m)		1993–05–12	National-U
G	77	(Philippines)	Ron Dennison	6 ft 0 in (1.83 m)		1993–11–21	Far Eastern
F/C	86	(Philippines)	Jonjon Gabriel	6 ft 6 in (1.98 m)		1993–01–06	San Lorenzo

Head coach

- (Philippines) Nash Racela

Assistant coach(es)

- (Philippines) Aries Dimaunahan (1st assistant)
- (Philippines) Rommel Adducul
- (Philippines) Jem Ryan Betia
- (Philippines) Gilbert Lao
- (Philippines) Benjamin Sipin

Team manager

- (Philippines) Jacob Nunez

Legend

- (C) Team captain
- (CI) Commissioner's Cup Import
- (GI) Governors' Cup Import
- (EI) EASL Import
- (DP) Unsigned draft pick
- (FA) Free agent
- (IN) Inactive
- (S) Suspended
- (R) Rookie
- Injured

Roster

== Philippine Cup ==
=== Eliminations ===
==== Standings ====
Pos	Team	W	L	PCT	GB	Qualification
1	Barangay Ginebra San Miguel	8	3	.727 (Note: Head-to-head record: Barangay Ginebra 1–0 Phoenix)	—	Twice-to-beat in quarterfinals
2	Phoenix Super LPG Fuel Masters	8	3	.727	—	Twice-to-beat in quarterfinals
3	TNT Tropang Giga	7	4	.636 (Note: Head-to-head quotient: TNT 1.074, San Miguel 1.023, Meralco 0.992, Alaska 0.959, Magnolia 0.955)	1	Twice-to-beat in quarterfinals
4	San Miguel Beermen	7	4	.636	1	Twice-to-beat in quarterfinals
5	Meralco Bolts	7	4	.636	1	Twice-to-win in quarterfinals
6	Alaska Aces	7	4	.636	1	Twice-to-win in quarterfinals
7	Magnolia Hotshots Pambansang Manok	7	4	.636	1	Twice-to-win in quarterfinals
8	Rain or Shine Elasto Painters	6	5	.545	2	Twice-to-win in quarterfinals
9	NLEX Road Warriors	5	6	.455	3	
10	Blackwater Elite	2	9	.182	6	
11	NorthPort Batang Pier	1	10	.091 (Note: Head-to-head record: NorthPort 1–0 Terrafirma)	7	
12	Terrafirma Dyip	1	10	.091	7	

Source: PBA.ph
Rules for classification: 1) winning percentage; 2) if two teams are tied, head to head record; if three or more teams are tied, head-to-head goal average (quotient), if tied for 8th, one-game playoff; 3) overall quotient 4) coin toss

==== Game log ====
2020 PBA Philippine Cup game log
Total: 2–9
October: 2–3

Game	Date	Opponent	Score	High points	High rebounds	High assists	Location Attendance	Record
1	October 12	NorthPort	W 96–89	Sumang, Trollano (17)	Don Trollano (10)	5 players (2)	AUF Sports Arena & Cultural Center	1–0
2	October 15	Barangay Ginebra	L 99–103	Don Trollano (23)	Don Trollano (10)	Sumang, Daquioag (4)	AUF Sports Arena & Cultural Center	1–1
3	October 17	NLEX	W 98–88	Canaleta, Trollano (18)	Don Trollano (11)	Ed Daquioag (8)	AUF Sports Arena & Cultural Center	2–1
4	October 20	Alaska	L 82–120	Ed Daquioag (18)	Jonjon Gabriel (7)	Mike Tolomia (7)	AUF Sports Arena & Cultural Center	2–2
5	October 22	TNT	L 96–109	Don Trollano (23)	Mac Belo (8)	Ed Daquioag (7)	AUF Sports Arena & Cultural Center	2–3

November: 0–6

Game	Date	Opponent	Score	High points	High rebounds	High assists	Location Attendance	Record
6	November 3	San Miguel	L 88–90 OT	Ed Daquioag (20)	KG Canaleta (10)	Mike Tolomia (5)	AUF Sports Arena & Cultural Center	2–4
7	November 4	Meralco	L 85–89	Don Trollano (16)	Don Trollano (6)	Roi Sumang (5)	AUF Sports Arena & Cultural Center	2–5
8	November 6	Terrafirma	L 101–110	KG Canaleta (29)	Don Trollano (13)	Roi Sumang (5)	AUF Sports Arena & Cultural Center	2–6
9	November 8	Rain or Shine	L 71–82	Mac Belo (15)	Roi Sumang (10)	Roi Sumang (7)	AUF Sports Arena & Cultural Center	2–7
10	November 9	Phoenix Super LPG	L 95–100	KG Canaleta (21)	Trollano, Belo (8)	Roi Sumang (5)	AUF Sports Arena & Cultural Center	2–8
11	November 11	Magnolia	L 80–95	KG Canaleta (14)	Don Trollano (10)	Roi Sumang (5)	AUF Sports Arena & Cultural Center	2–9

== Transactions ==
=== Trades ===
==== Preseason ====
January
January 16, 2020	To Blackwater Ron Dennison	To Phoenix Brian Heruela

February
February 28, 2020	To Blackwater Marion Magat (from TNT); Yousef Taha (from TNT); Ed Daquioag (from TNT via Rain or Shine); 2021 first round pick (from TNT); 2022 first round pick (from TNT)	To NLEX Anthony Semerad (from Blackwater); Rabeh Al-Hussaini (from Blackwater); 2020 first round pick (from Blackwater); 2021 second round pick (from Blackwater)	To TNT John Paul Erram (from Blackwater via NLEX)

=== Free agents ===
==== Rookie Signings ====
Player	Signed	School/club
Maurice Shaw	December 15, 2019	Power Electricity Authority (PEA)
Richard Escoto	December 22, 2019	Far Eastern

=== Other Signings ===
Player	Signed	School/club
Jon-Jon Gabriel	February 8, 2020	Manila Stars (MPBL)
