= 2020 Terrafirma Dyip season =

- Head coach: Johnedel Cardel
- Owner: Terra Firma Realty Development Corponration

Philippine Cup results
- Record: 1–10 (9.1%)
- Place: 12th
- Playoff finish: Did not qualify

Terrafirma Dyip seasons

The 2020 Terra Firma Dyip season was the 6th season of the franchise in the Philippine Basketball Association (PBA).

== Highlights ==
- June 4, 2020: The PBA Board of Governors approved the transfer of ownership of the Columbian Dyip franchise from Columbian Autocar Corporation to its sister company, Terra Firma Realty Development Corporation. The team will carry the Terra Firma brand.

== Key dates ==
- December 8, 2019: The 2019 PBA draft took place in Midtown Atrium, Robinson Place Manila.
- March 11, 2020: The PBA postponed the season due to the threat of the coronavirus.

== Draft picks ==
=== Special draft ===
Round	Pick	Player	Position	Nationality	PBA D-League team	College
1	1	Isaac Go	Center	Philippines	Cignal HD Hawkeyes	Ateneo

=== Regular draft ===
Round	Pick	Player	Position	Nationality	PBA D-League team	College
1	1	Roosevelt Adams	Small Forward	United States	Go for Gold Scratchers	Idaho
1	12	Christian Balagasay	Center	Philippines	Petron	Letran
3	25	Bonbon Batiller	Shooting Guard	Philippines	Petron	Letran
4	36	Marco Balagtas	Small Forward	Philippines	Diliman College-Gerry's	José Rizal

== Roster ==
2020 Terrafirma Dyip roster
Players
Coaches

Pos.	#	POB	Name	Height	Weight	DOB (YYYY–MM–DD)	From
F	1	(United States)	Roosevelt Adams	6 ft 5 in (1.96 m)	190 lb (86 kg)	1994–05–22	College of Idaho
G	5	(Philippines)	Juami Tiongson	5 ft 10 in (1.78 m)	175 lb (79 kg)	1991–02–05	Ateneo
G/F	7	(Hong Kong)	CJ Perez	6 ft 2 in (1.88 m)	185 lb (84 kg)	1993–11–17	Lyceum
G	8	(Philippines)	JP Calvo	5 ft 7 in (1.70 m)	173 lb (78 kg)	1997–09–29	Letran
F	10	(Sweden)	Andreas Cahilig	6 ft 5 in (1.96 m)		1991–01–22	EARIST
G	11	(United States)	Rashawn McCarthy (C)	6 ft 0 in (1.83 m)	175 lb (79 kg)	1989–09–10	SUNY–Old Westbury
F	12	(Philippines)	Glenn Khobuntin	6 ft 4 in (1.93 m)	195 lb (88 kg)	1991–09–07	National-U
F	13	(Philippines)	Eric Camson	6 ft 4 in (1.93 m)	228 lb (103 kg)	1990–05–12	Adamson
F/C	15	(Philippines)	Jeepy Faundo	6 ft 6 in (1.98 m)		1995–09–21	UST
F	17	(Philippines)	Aldrech Ramos	6 ft 6 in (1.98 m)	190 lb (86 kg)	1988–04–03	Far Eastern
C	18	(Philippines)	Joseph Gabayni	6 ft 5 in (1.96 m)	175 lb (79 kg)	1994–09–28	Lyceum
F	23	(Philippines)	Keith Agovida	6 ft 2 in (1.88 m)	170 lb (77 kg)	1990–02–14	Arellano
G	24	(Philippines)	Bonbon Batiller	6 ft 0 in (1.83 m)	276 lb (125 kg)	1994-04-23	Letran
C	30	(Philippines)	Christian Balagasay	6 ft 5 in (1.96 m)	215 lb (98 kg)	1996-10-28	Letran
G	31	(Philippines)	Reden Celda	6 ft 0 in (1.83 m)	165 lb (75 kg)	1992–03–01	National-U

Head coach

- (Philippines) Johnedel Cardel

Assistant coach(es)

- (Philippines) Hubert delos Santos (1st assistant)
- (Philippines) Art dela Cruz
- (Philippines) Raymond Tiongco

Team manager

- (Philippines) Joe Lipa

Legend

- (C) Team captain
- (CI) Commissioner's Cup Import
- (GI) Governors' Cup Import
- (EI) EASL Import
- (DP) Unsigned draft pick
- (FA) Free agent
- (IN) Inactive
- (S) Suspended
- (R) Rookie
- Injured

Roster

== Philippine Cup ==
=== Eliminations ===
==== Standings ====
Pos	Team	W	L	PCT	GB	Qualification
1	Barangay Ginebra San Miguel	8	3	.727 (Note: Head-to-head record: Barangay Ginebra 1–0 Phoenix)	—	Twice-to-beat in quarterfinals
2	Phoenix Super LPG Fuel Masters	8	3	.727	—	Twice-to-beat in quarterfinals
3	TNT Tropang Giga	7	4	.636 (Note: Head-to-head quotient: TNT 1.074, San Miguel 1.023, Meralco 0.992, Alaska 0.959, Magnolia 0.955)	1	Twice-to-beat in quarterfinals
4	San Miguel Beermen	7	4	.636	1	Twice-to-beat in quarterfinals
5	Meralco Bolts	7	4	.636	1	Twice-to-win in quarterfinals
6	Alaska Aces	7	4	.636	1	Twice-to-win in quarterfinals
7	Magnolia Hotshots Pambansang Manok	7	4	.636	1	Twice-to-win in quarterfinals
8	Rain or Shine Elasto Painters	6	5	.545	2	Twice-to-win in quarterfinals
9	NLEX Road Warriors	5	6	.455	3	
10	Blackwater Elite	2	9	.182	6	
11	NorthPort Batang Pier	1	10	.091 (Note: Head-to-head record: NorthPort 1–0 Terrafirma)	7	
12	Terrafirma Dyip	1	10	.091	7	

Source: PBA.ph
Rules for classification: 1) winning percentage; 2) if two teams are tied, head to head record; if three or more teams are tied, head-to-head goal average (quotient), if tied for 8th, one-game playoff; 3) overall quotient 4) coin toss

==== Game log ====
2020 PBA Philippine Cup game log
Total: 1–10
October: 0–5

Game	Date	Opponent	Score	High points	High rebounds	High assists	Location Attendance	Record
1	October 13	TNT	L 101–112	CJ Perez (30)	Roosevelt Adams (10)	McCarthy, Calvo (5)	AUF Sports Arena & Cultural Center	0–1
2	October 16	Rain or Shine	L 82–91	CJ Perez (26)	CJ Perez (10)	CJ Perez (6)	AUF Sports Arena & Cultural Center	0–2
3	October 19	San Miguel	L 98–105	CJ Perez (20)	CJ Perez (9)	CJ Perez (6)	AUF Sports Arena & Cultural Center	0–3
4	October 24	NorthPort	L 96–107	CJ Perez (25)	Roosevelt Adams (8)	CJ Perez (5)	AUF Sports Arena & Cultural Center	0–4
5	October 27	Alaska	L 96–99	CJ Perez (25)	Roosevelt Adams (10)	CJ Perez (6)	AUF Sports Arena & Cultural Center	0–5

November: 1–5

Game	Date	Opponent	Score	High points	High rebounds	High assists	Location Attendance	Record
6	November 3	Phoenix Super LPG	L 94–116	CJ Perez (32)	CJ Perez (9)	CJ Perez (5)	AUF Sports Arena & Cultural Center	0–6
7	November 5	Magnolia	L 89–103	CJ Perez (19)	Reden Celda (9)	Tiongson, Khobuntin (3)	AUF Sports Arena & Cultural Center	0–7
8	November 6	Blackwater	W 110–101	CJ Perez (27)	Roosevelt Adams (16)	Ramos, Calvo, Perez (3)	AUF Sports Arena & Cultural Center	1–7
9	November 8	Meralco	L 93–95	Tiongson, Perez (21)	CJ Perez (8)	CJ Perez (7)	AUF Sports Arena & Cultural Center	1–8
10	November 9	Barangay Ginebra	L 80–102	Tiongson, Perez (16)	Tiongson, Perez, Faundo (5)	CJ Perez (5)	AUF Sports Arena & Cultural Center	1–9
11	November 11	NLEX	L 101–127	CJ Perez (27)	CJ Perez (10)	Tiongson, Camson (4)	AUF Sports Arena & Cultural Center	1–10

== Transactions ==
=== Trades ===
December
December 13, 2019	To Columbian Dyip Aldrech Ramos	To Magnolia Jackson Corpuz

=== Free agents ===
==== Additions ====
Player	Signed	Former team
Andreas Cahilig	January 19, 2020	Re-signed
Glenn Khobuntin	January 19, 2020	Re-signed
Eric Camson	January 19, 2020	Re-signed

==== Subtractions ====
Player	Left	New team
Jay-R Reyes	February 6, 2020	Phoenix Super LPG Fuel Masters

=== Rookie signings ===
Player	Signed
Roosevelt Adams	December 13, 2019
Christian Balagasay	January 3, 2020
Bonbon Batiller	January 3, 2020
