= 2020 Magnolia Hotshots Pambansang Manok season =

- Head coach: Chito Victolero
- Owners: San Miguel-Pure Foods Co., Inc. (a San Miguel Corporation subsidiary)

Philippine Cup results
- Record: 7–4 (63.6%)
- Place: 7th
- Playoff finish: Quarterfinalist (lost to Phoenix Super LPG with twice-to-win disadvantage)

Magnolia Hotshots Pambansang Manok seasons

The 2020 Magnolia Hotshots Pambansang Manok season was the 32nd season of the franchise in the Philippine Basketball Association (PBA).

== Key dates ==
- December 8: The 2019 PBA draft took place in Midtown Atrium, Robinson Place Manila.
- March 11: The PBA postponed the season due to the threat of the coronavirus.

== Draft picks ==
Round	Pick	Player	Position	Nationality	PBA D-League team	College
1	9	Aris Dionisio	F	Philippines	Gamboa Coffee Mixers	St. Clare
2	21	Yankie Haruna	F	Philippines	Go for Gold Scratchers	St. Benlide
3	32	Alvin Capobres	F	Philippines	Valencia City, Bukidnon	San Sebastian

== Roster ==
2020 Magnolia Hotshots Pambansang Manok roster
Players
Coaches

Pos.	#	POB	Name	Height	Weight	DOB (YYYY–MM–DD)	From
F	1	(Philippines)	Jackson Corpuz	6 ft 4 in (1.93 m)	195 lb (88 kg)	1989–02–08	Philippine Christian
G	2	(Philippines)	Justin Melton	5 ft 11 in (1.80 m)	163 lb (74 kg)	1987–04–07	Mount Olive
G	3	(Philippines)	Paul Lee	6 ft 0 in (1.83 m)	200 lb (91 kg)	1989–02–14	UE
C	4	(United States)	Rafi Reavis (C)	6 ft 8 in (2.03 m)	210 lb (95 kg)	1977–07–26	Coppin State
G	6	(Philippines)	Jio Jalalon	5 ft 9 in (1.75 m)	150 lb (68 kg)	1992–08–02	Arellano
G	8	(Philippines)	Peter June Simon	6 ft 0 in (1.83 m)	180 lb (82 kg)	1980–06–01	Mindanao
F/C	10	(Philippines)	Ian Sangalang	6 ft 7 in (2.01 m)	212 lb (96 kg)	1991–12–20	San Sebastian
F	11	(Philippines)	Michael Calisaan	6 ft 4 in (1.93 m)	175 lb (79 kg)	1995–02–27	San Sebastian
G	14	(Philippines)	Mark Barroca	5 ft 10 in (1.78 m)	170 lb (77 kg)	1986–04–25	Far Eastern
F	19	(United States)	Rome dela Rosa	6 ft 3 in (1.91 m)	185 lb (84 kg)	1990–12–11	San Beda
G	22	(United States)	Chris Banchero	6 ft 1 in (1.85 m)	175 lb (79 kg)	1989–01–24	Seattle Pacific
G	29	(Philippines)	Alvin Abundo	5 ft 8 in (1.73 m)	150 lb (68 kg)	1992–10–29	Centro Escolar
F/C	32	(United States)	Kyle Pascual	6 ft 6 in (1.98 m)	210 lb (95 kg)	1990–04–13	San Beda
F/C	41	(Philippines)	Jessie Saitanan	6 ft 4 in (1.93 m)	200 lb (91 kg)	1992–10–07	Mapúa
F	57	(Philippines)	Aris Dionisio (R)	6 ft 5 in (1.96 m)	203 lb (92 kg)	1995–07–21	St. Clare

Head coach

- (Philippines) Chito Victolero

Assistant coach(es)

- (Philippines) Jason Webb (1st Assistant)
- (Philippines) Johnny Abarrientos
- (Philippines) Mon Jose
- (Philippines) Juno Sauler

Team manager

- (Philippines) Alvin Patrimonio

Legend

- (C) Team captain
- (CI) Commissioner's Cup Import
- (GI) Governors' Cup Import
- (EI) EASL Import
- (DP) Unsigned draft pick
- (FA) Free agent
- (IN) Inactive
- (S) Suspended
- (R) Rookie
- Injured

Roster

== Philippine Cup ==
=== Eliminations ===
==== Standings ====
Pos	Team	W	L	PCT	GB	Qualification
1	Barangay Ginebra San Miguel	8	3	.727 (Note: Head-to-head record: Barangay Ginebra 1–0 Phoenix)	—	Twice-to-beat in quarterfinals
2	Phoenix Super LPG Fuel Masters	8	3	.727	—	Twice-to-beat in quarterfinals
3	TNT Tropang Giga	7	4	.636 (Note: Head-to-head quotient: TNT 1.074, San Miguel 1.023, Meralco 0.992, Alaska 0.959, Magnolia 0.955)	1	Twice-to-beat in quarterfinals
4	San Miguel Beermen	7	4	.636	1	Twice-to-beat in quarterfinals
5	Meralco Bolts	7	4	.636	1	Twice-to-win in quarterfinals
6	Alaska Aces	7	4	.636	1	Twice-to-win in quarterfinals
7	Magnolia Hotshots Pambansang Manok	7	4	.636	1	Twice-to-win in quarterfinals
8	Rain or Shine Elasto Painters	6	5	.545	2	Twice-to-win in quarterfinals
9	NLEX Road Warriors	5	6	.455	3	
10	Blackwater Elite	2	9	.182	6	
11	NorthPort Batang Pier	1	10	.091 (Note: Head-to-head record: NorthPort 1–0 Terrafirma)	7	
12	Terrafirma Dyip	1	10	.091	7	

Source: PBA.ph
Rules for classification: 1) winning percentage; 2) if two teams are tied, head to head record; if three or more teams are tied, head-to-head goal average (quotient), if tied for 8th, one-game playoff; 3) overall quotient 4) coin toss

==== Game log ====
2020 PBA Philippine Cup game log
Total: 7–4
March: 0–1

Game	Date	Opponent	Score	High points	High rebounds	High assists	Location Attendance	Record
1	March 8	San Miguel	L 78–94	Paul Lee (19)	Jackson Corpuz (13)	Chris Banchero (6)	Smart Araneta Coliseum	0–1

October: 2–3

Game	Date	Opponent	Score	High points	High rebounds	High assists	Location Attendance	Record
2	October 14	NLEX	W 103–100	Banchero, Jalalon (19)	Ian Sangalang (10)	Jio Jalalon (4)	AUF Sports Arena & Cultural Center	1–1
3	October 17	Alaska	L 81–87	Mark Barroca (16)	Reavis, Sangalang (7)	Mark Barroca (5)	AUF Sports Arena & Cultural Center	1–2
4	October 20	Meralco	L 104–109 (OT)	Paul Lee (32)	Jackson Corpuz (8)	Chris Banchero (4)	AUF Sports Arena & Cultural Center	1–3
5	October 23	Phoenix Super LPG	L 84–91	Chris Banchero (20)	Rafi Reavis (10)	Barroca, Lee (6)	AUF Sports Arena & Cultural Center	1–4
6	October 25	Barangay Ginebra	W 102–92	Jackson Corpuz (20)	Ian Sangalang (8)	Jio Jalalon (10)	AUF Sports Arena & Cultural Center	2–4

November: 5–0

Game	Date	Opponent	Score	High points	High rebounds	High assists	Location Attendance	Record
7	November 4	TNT	W 102–92	Paul Lee (27)	Ian Sangalang (9)	Mark Barroca (7)	AUF Sports Arena & Cultural Center	3–4
8	November 5	Terrafirma	W 103–89	Paul Lee (29)	Ian Sangalang (10)	Banchero, Barroca (7)	AUF Sports Arena & Cultural Center	4–4
9	November 7	Rain or Shine	W 70–62	Paul Lee (31)	Rafi Reavis (11)	Jio Jalalon (3)	AUF Sports Arena & Cultural Center	5–4
10	November 8	NorthPort	W 83–76	Ian Sangalang (23)	Ian Sangalang (9)	Paul Lee (8)	AUF Sports Arena & Cultural Center	6–4
11	November 11	Blackwater	W 95–80	Ian Sangalang (17)	Ian Sangalang (10)	Banchero, Barroca (6)	AUF Sports Arena & Cultural Center	7–4

=== Playoffs ===
==== Bracket ====
Quarterfinals (Top 4 twice-to-beat)
1	Barangay Ginebra	81
8	Rain or Shine	73
4	San Miguel	71	68
5	Meralco	78	90
2	Phoenix Super LPG	89
7	Magnolia	88
3	TNT	104
6	Alaska	83

Semifinals (Best-of-5)
1	Barangay Ginebra	3
5	Meralco	2
2	Phoenix Super LPG	2
3	TNT	3

Finals (Best-of-7)
1	Barangay Ginebra	4
3	TNT	1

==== Game log ====
2020 PBA Philippine Cup playoffs game log
Total: 0–1
Quarterfinals: 0–1

Game	Date	Opponent	Score	High points	High rebounds	High assists	Location Attendance	Series
1	November 14	Phoenix Super LPG	L 88–89	Paul Lee (17)	Ian Sangalang (11)	Paul Lee (6)	AUF Sports Arena & Cultural Center	0–1

== Transactions ==
=== Trades ===
Off-season

December 13, 2019	To Magnolia Jackson Corpuz	To Columbian Aldrech Ramos

=== Free agents ===
==== Re-signed ====
Player	Date	Signed
Justin Melton	January 23, 2020	Two-year contract extension

==== Rookie signings ====
Player	Signed	PBA D-League team
Aris Dionisio	Undisclosed	Gamboa Coffee Mixers
Alvin Capobres	Undisclosed	Valencia City, Bukidnon
