= 2020 TNT Tropang Giga season =

- Head coach: Bong Ravena
- Consultant: Mark Dickel
- General manager: Gabby Cui; Miguel Fernandez(assistant)
- Owners: Smart Communications (an MVP Group subsidiary)

Philippine Cup results
- Record: 7–4 (63.6%)
- Place: 3rd
- Playoff finish: Runner-up (lost to Barangay Ginebra, 1–4)

TNT Tropang Giga seasons

The 2020 TNT Tropang Giga season was the 30th season of the franchise in the Philippine Basketball Association (PBA).

== Key dates ==
- December 8, 2019: The 2019 PBA draft took place in Midtown Atrium, Robinson Place Manila.
- March 11, 2020: The PBA postponed the season due to the threat of the coronavirus.

== Draft picks ==
Round	Pick	Player	Position	Nationality	PBA D-League team	College
1	11	Kib Montalbo	G	Philippines	Marinerong Pilipino Skippers	De La Salle
3	34	Simon Camacho	F	Philippines	Akari	Adamson
4	41	Val Chauca	G	United States	FamilyMart - Enderun	Adamson

== Roster ==
2020 TNT Tropang Giga roster
Players
Coaches

Pos.	#	POB	Name	Height	Weight	DOB (YYYY–MM–DD)	From
G	0	(United States)	Simon Enciso	5 ft 11 in (1.80 m)	185 lb (84 kg)	1991–02–12	Notre Dame de Namur
G/F	1	(Philippines)	Bobby Ray Jr. Parks	6 ft 4 in (1.93 m)	215 lb (98 kg)	1993–02–19	National-U
F	4	(United States)	Harvey Carey	6 ft 3 in (1.91 m)	210 lb (95 kg)	1979–03–18	Sonoma State
C	7	(Philippines)	John Paul Erram	6 ft 8 in (2.03 m)	227 lb (103 kg)	1989–07–07	Ateneo
F	9	(Philippines)	Samboy de Leon	6 ft 3 in (1.91 m)	190 lb (86 kg)	1992–03–09	Centro Escolar
G	10	(Philippines)	Ryan Reyes	6 ft 2 in (1.88 m)	190 lb (86 kg)	1983–08–10	Cal State Fullerton
G	12	(Philippines)	Jjay Alejandro	6 ft 4 in (1.93 m)	215 lb (98 kg)	1995–04–13	National-U
F	14	(Australia)	David Semerad	6 ft 4 in (1.93 m)	220 lb (100 kg)	1991–04–25	San Beda
G	15	(Philippines)	Kib Montalbo (R)	6 ft 4 in (1.93 m)	215 lb (98 kg)	1995–04–02	De La Salle
G/F	16	(Philippines)	Roger Pogoy	6 ft 3 in (1.91 m)	180 lb (82 kg)	1992–06–16	Far Eastern
G	17	(Philippines)	Jayson Castro (C)	5 ft 10 in (1.78 m)	185 lb (84 kg)	1986–06–30	Philippine Christian
F	18	(Philippines)	Troy Rosario	6 ft 7 in (2.01 m)	198 lb (90 kg)	1992–01–20	National-U
G	26	(Philippines)	Almond Vosotros	5 ft 10 in (1.78 m)	165 lb (75 kg)	1990–01–26	De La Salle
F	32	(Philippines)	Jay Washington	6 ft 7 in (2.01 m)	210 lb (95 kg)	1981–11–10	Eckerd
F/C	34	(Philippines)	Lervyn Flores	6 ft 5 in (1.96 m)		1993-01-01	Arellano

Head coach

- (Philippines) Bong Ravena

Assistant coach(es)

- (Philippines) Sandy Arespacochaga (1st assistant)
- (Philippines) Yuri Escueta
- (Philippines) Ranidel de Ocampo
- (United States) Alton Lister
- (Philippines) Josh Reyes
- (New Zealand) Mark Dickel (consultant)

Team manager

- (Philippines) Gabby Cui
- (Philippines) Miguel Fernandez (assistant)

Legend

- (C) Team captain
- (CI) Commissioner's Cup Import
- (GI) Governors' Cup Import
- (EI) EASL Import
- (DP) Unsigned draft pick
- (FA) Free agent
- (IN) Inactive
- (S) Suspended
- (R) Rookie
- Injured

Roster

== Philippine Cup ==
=== Eliminations ===
==== Standings ====
Pos	Team	W	L	PCT	GB	Qualification
1	Barangay Ginebra San Miguel	8	3	.727 (Note: Head-to-head record: Barangay Ginebra 1–0 Phoenix)	—	Twice-to-beat in quarterfinals
2	Phoenix Super LPG Fuel Masters	8	3	.727	—	Twice-to-beat in quarterfinals
3	TNT Tropang Giga	7	4	.636 (Note: Head-to-head quotient: TNT 1.074, San Miguel 1.023, Meralco 0.992, Alaska 0.959, Magnolia 0.955)	1	Twice-to-beat in quarterfinals
4	San Miguel Beermen	7	4	.636	1	Twice-to-beat in quarterfinals
5	Meralco Bolts	7	4	.636	1	Twice-to-win in quarterfinals
6	Alaska Aces	7	4	.636	1	Twice-to-win in quarterfinals
7	Magnolia Hotshots Pambansang Manok	7	4	.636	1	Twice-to-win in quarterfinals
8	Rain or Shine Elasto Painters	6	5	.545	2	Twice-to-win in quarterfinals
9	NLEX Road Warriors	5	6	.455	3	
10	Blackwater Elite	2	9	.182	6	
11	NorthPort Batang Pier	1	10	.091 (Note: Head-to-head record: NorthPort 1–0 Terrafirma)	7	
12	Terrafirma Dyip	1	10	.091	7	

Source: PBA.ph
Rules for classification: 1) winning percentage; 2) if two teams are tied, head to head record; if three or more teams are tied, head-to-head goal average (quotient), if tied for 8th, one-game playoff; 3) overall quotient 4) coin toss

==== Game log ====
2020 PBA Philippine Cup game log
Total: 5–1
October: 5–1

Game	Date	Opponent	Score	High points	High rebounds	High assists	Location Attendance	Record
1	October 11	Alaska	W 100–95	Roger Pogoy (45)	Pogoy, Erram (8)	John Paul Erram (6)	AUF Sports Arena & Cultural Center	1–0
2	October 13	Terrafirma	W 112–101	Bobby Ray Parks Jr. (40)	Troy Rosario (15)	Rosario, Parks (5)	AUF Sports Arena & Cultural Center	2–0
3	October 16	San Miguel	W 107–88	John Paul Erram (27)	John Paul Erram (15)	Jayson Castro (11)	AUF Sports Arena & Cultural Center	3–0
4	October 19	Phoenix	W 110–91	Roger Pogoy (30)	John Paul Erram (15)	Castro, Parks (5)	AUF Sports Arena & Cultural Center	4–0
5	October 22	Blackwater	W 109–96	Roger Pogoy (20)	Troy Rosario (12)	Erram, Parks (5)	AUF Sports Arena & Cultural Center	5–0
6	October 29	NLEX	L 98–109	Jayson Castro (27)	Troy Rosario (12)	Jayson Castro (8)	AUF Sports Arena & Cultural Center	5–1
