= 2020 NLEX Road Warriors season =

- Head coach: Yeng Guiao
- Owners: Metro Pacific Investments Corporation (an MVP Group subsidiary)

Philippine Cup results
- Record: 5–6 (45.5%)
- Place: 9th
- Playoff finish: Did not qualify

NLEX Road Warriors seasons

The 2020 NLEX Road Warriors season was the 6th season of the franchise in the Philippine Basketball Association (PBA).

== Key dates ==
- December 8, 2019: The 2019 PBA draft took place in Midtown Atrium, Robinson Place Manila.
- March 11, 2020: The PBA postponed the season due to the threat of the coronavirus.

== Draft picks ==
=== Special draft ===
Round	Pick	Player	Position	Nationality	PBA D-League team	College
1	3	Matt Nieto	G	Philippines	Cignal HD Hawkeyes	Ateneo

=== Regular draft ===
Round	Pick	Player	Position	Nationality	PBA D-League team	College
1	3	Mike Ayonayon	G	Philippines	Marinerong Pilipino Skippers	PCU
2	15	Will McAloney	F	Philippines	Marinerong Pilipino Skippers	San Carlos
2	20	AC Soberano	G	Philippines	Metropac Movers	San Beda
3	27	Gelo Vito	C	Philippines	Wang's Basketball Couriers	UP
4	38	Jayvee Marcelino	G	Philippines	Wang's Basketball Couriers	Lyceum
5	43	Jeramer Cabanag	G	Philippines	Wang's Basketball Couriers	San Beda

== Roster ==
2020 NLEX Road Warriors roster
Players
Coaches

Pos.	#	POB	Name	Height	Weight	DOB (YYYY–MM–DD)	From
F/C	2	(Philippines)	Michael Miranda	6 ft 6 in (1.98 m)	210 lb (95 kg)	1990–12–12	San Sebastian
C	4	(Philippines)	Raul Soyud	6 ft 5 in (1.96 m)	220 lb (100 kg)	1991–01–14	Philippines
G	7	(Philippines)	Kevin Alas	6 ft 0 in (1.83 m)	175 lb (79 kg)	1991–11–13	Letran
G	9	(Philippines)	Philip Paniamogan	6 ft 0 in (1.83 m)	180 lb (82 kg)	1991–05–30	José Rizal
F	10	(United States)	Paul Varilla	6 ft 3 in (1.91 m)	185 lb (84 kg)	1994–10–08	UE
F/C	14	(Philippines)	Kris Porter	6 ft 5 in (1.96 m)	195 lb (88 kg)	1994–09–02	Ateneo
F	17	(Philippines)	Kenneth Ighalo	6 ft 2 in (1.88 m)	175 lb (79 kg)	1989–01–11	Mapúa
G	18	(Philippines)	Mike Ayonayon (R)				Philippine Christian
F	20	(United States)	Will McAloney (R)	6 ft 4 in (1.93 m)		1993–09–01	San Carlos
G	24	(Philippines)	Kiefer Ravena	5 ft 11 in (1.80 m)	180 lb (82 kg)	1993–10–27	Ateneo
F	33	(Australia)	Anthony Semerad	6 ft 4 in (1.93 m)	220 lb (100 kg)	1991–04–25	San Beda
F/C	37	(Philippines)	J. R. Quiñahan	6 ft 6 in (1.98 m)	235 lb (107 kg)	1984–05–08	Visayas
G	39	(Philippines)	Jericho Cruz	6 ft 1 in (1.85 m)	190 lb (86 kg)	1990–10–11	Adamson
G	77	(Philippines)	Bong Galanza	6 ft 2 in (1.88 m)	185 lb (84 kg)	1992–12–21	UE
C	88	(Tonga)	Asi Taulava (C)	6 ft 9 in (2.06 m)	245 lb (111 kg)	1973–03–02	BYU–Hawaii

Head coach

- (Philippines) Yeng Guiao

Assistant coach(es)

- (Philippines) Adonis Tierra (1st assistant)
- (Philippines) Ford Arao
- (Philippines) Luisito Cruz
- (Philippines) Jojo Lastimosa

Team manager

- (Philippines) Ronald Dulatre
- (Philippines) Raymond Celis (Assistant)

Legend

- (C) Team captain
- (CI) Commissioner's Cup Import
- (GI) Governors' Cup Import
- (EI) EASL Import
- (DP) Unsigned draft pick
- (FA) Free agent
- (IN) Inactive
- (S) Suspended
- (R) Rookie
- Injured

Roster

== Philippine Cup ==
=== Eliminations ===
==== Standings ====
Pos	Team	W	L	PCT	GB	Qualification
1	Barangay Ginebra San Miguel	8	3	.727 (Note: Head-to-head record: Barangay Ginebra 1–0 Phoenix)	—	Twice-to-beat in quarterfinals
2	Phoenix Super LPG Fuel Masters	8	3	.727	—	Twice-to-beat in quarterfinals
3	TNT Tropang Giga	7	4	.636 (Note: Head-to-head quotient: TNT 1.074, San Miguel 1.023, Meralco 0.992, Alaska 0.959, Magnolia 0.955)	1	Twice-to-beat in quarterfinals
4	San Miguel Beermen	7	4	.636	1	Twice-to-beat in quarterfinals
5	Meralco Bolts	7	4	.636	1	Twice-to-win in quarterfinals
6	Alaska Aces	7	4	.636	1	Twice-to-win in quarterfinals
7	Magnolia Hotshots Pambansang Manok	7	4	.636	1	Twice-to-win in quarterfinals
8	Rain or Shine Elasto Painters	6	5	.545	2	Twice-to-win in quarterfinals
9	NLEX Road Warriors	5	6	.455	3	
10	Blackwater Elite	2	9	.182	6	
11	NorthPort Batang Pier	1	10	.091 (Note: Head-to-head record: NorthPort 1–0 Terrafirma)	7	
12	Terrafirma Dyip	1	10	.091	7	

Source: PBA.ph
Rules for classification: 1) winning percentage; 2) if two teams are tied, head to head record; if three or more teams are tied, head-to-head goal average (quotient), if tied for 8th, one-game playoff; 3) overall quotient 4) coin toss

==== Game log ====
2020 PBA Philippine Cup game log
Total: 5–6
October: 2–5

Game	Date	Opponent	Score	High points	High rebounds	High assists	Location Attendance	Record
1	October 11	Barangay Ginebraa	L 92–102	J. R. Quiñahan (26)	Soyud, Alas (8)	Kevin Alas (5)	AUF Sports Arena & Cultural Center	0–1
2	October 14	Magnolia	L 100–103	Kiefer Ravena (27)	Raul Soyud (12)	Kevin Alas (5)	AUF Sports Arena & Cultural Center	0–2
3	October 17	Blackwater	L 88–98	Mike Ayonayon (20)	Kiefer Ravena (8)	Kiefer Ravena (7)	AUF Sports Arena & Cultural Center	0–3
4	October 21	NorthPort	W 102–88	Kiefer Ravena (25)	Soyud, Alas (10)	Kevin Alas (6)	AUF Sports Arena & Cultural Center	1–3
5	October 23	Meralco	L 92–101	Kiefer Ravena (30)	J. R. Quiñahan (11)	Kevin Alas (5)	AUF Sports Arena & Cultural Center	1–4
6	October 26	Phoenix Super LPG	L 110–114	Raul Soyud (27)	Quiñahan, Ravena (5)	Kiefer Ravena (10)	AUF Sports Arena & Cultural Center	1–5
7	October 29	TNT	W 109–98	Kevin Alas (24)	J. R. Quiñahan (10)	J. R. Quiñahan (7)	AUF Sports Arena & Cultural Center	2–5

November: 3–1

Game	Date	Opponent	Score	High points	High rebounds	High assists	Location Attendance	Record
8	November 4	Rain or Shine	W 94–74	Kevin Alas (18)	Raul Soyud (9)	Mike Ayonayon (7)	AUF Sports Arena & Cultural Center	3–5
9	November 6	San Miguel	W 124–90	Michael Miranda (22)	Kevin Alas (9)	Ravena, Cruz (7)	AUF Sports Arena & Cultural Center	4–5
10	November 9	Alaska	L 119–122 OT	Kiefer Ravena (30)	Raul Soyud (10)	Ravena, Alas (7)	AUF Sports Arena & Cultural Center	4–6
11	November 11	Terrafirma	W 127–101	Kiefer Ravena (23)	Michael Miranda (8)	Jericho Cruz (6)	AUF Sports Arena & Cultural Center	5–6
