= 2020 Alaska Aces season =

- Head coach: Jeffrey Cariaso
- General manager: Dickie Bachmann
- Owner: Alaska Milk Corporation

Philippine Cup results
- Record: 7–4 (63.6%)
- Place: 6th
- Playoff finish: Quarterfinalist (lost to TNT with twice-to-win disadvantage)

Alaska Aces seasons

The 2020 Alaska Aces season was the 34th season of the franchise in the Philippine Basketball Association (PBA).

== Key dates ==
- December 8: The 2019 PBA draft took place in Midtown Atrium, Robinson Place Manila.
- March 11: The PBA postponed the season due to the threat of the coronavirus.

== Draft picks ==
=== Special draft ===
Round	Pick	Player	Position	Nationality	PBA D-League team	School / club team
1	4	Allyn Bulanadi	F	Philippines	Valencia City, Bukidnon	San Sebastian

=== Regular draft ===
Round	Pick	Player	Position	Nationality	PBA D-League team	School / club team
1	4	Barkley Eboña	F	Philippines	Cha Dao Tea Place	Far Eastern
2	16	Rey Publico	C	Philippines	Go for Gold Scratchers	Letran
2	17	Jaycee Marcelino	G	Philippines	Zark's Jawbreakers	Lyceum

== Roster ==
2020 Alaska Aces roster
Players
Coaches

Pos.	#	POB	Name	Height	Weight	DOB (YYYY–MM–DD)	From
G/F	1	(United States)	Robbie Herndon	6 ft 3 in (1.91 m)	180 lb (82 kg)	1993–07–16	San Francisco State
F/C	2	(Philippines)	Abu Tratter	6 ft 6 in (1.98 m)	215 lb (98 kg)	1993–01–09	De La Salle
G	3	(United States)	Michael DiGregorio	6 ft 1 in (1.85 m)	185 lb (84 kg)	1990–12–12	McKendree
C	8	(Philippines)	Barkley Eboña (R)	6 ft 6 in (1.98 m)	194 lb (88 kg)	1995–11–25	Far Eastern
G/F	10	(Philippines)	Jeron Teng	6 ft 3 in (1.91 m)	185 lb (84 kg)	1994–03–21	De La Salle
G	13	(United States)	Maverick Ahanmisi	6 ft 2 in (1.88 m)	185 lb (84 kg)	1991–07–17	Minnesota
G	19	(Philippines)	Jaycee Marcelino (R)	5 ft 9 in (1.75 m)		1995–10–19	Lyceum
G	23	(United States)	Abel Galliguez	5 ft 9 in (1.75 m)	175 lb (79 kg)	1990–04–14	John Brown
F	24	(Philippines)	Vic Manuel	6 ft 4 in (1.93 m)	201 lb (91 kg)	1987–06–18	PSBA
G/F	25	(Philippines)	Jesper Ayaay	6 ft 1 in (1.85 m)		1993–08–03	Lyceum
F	31	(Philippines)	Rey Publico (R)	6 ft 4 in (1.93 m)	193 lb (88 kg)	1992–11–29	Letran
F/C	32	(Philippines)	Yutien Andrada	6 ft 5 in (1.96 m)	203 lb (92 kg)	1990–11–18	De La Salle
G	42	(Philippines)	JVee Casio (C)	5 ft 10 in (1.78 m)	175 lb (79 kg)	1986–09–01	De La Salle
F	61	(Philippines)	Kevin Racal	6 ft 3 in (1.91 m)	175 lb (79 kg)	1991–05–16	Letran
F	91	(Philippines)	Rodney Brondial	6 ft 5 in (1.96 m)	210 lb (95 kg)	1990–11–20	Adamson

Head coach

- (United States) Jeffrey Cariaso

Assistant coach(es)

- (United States) Tony dela Cruz (1st assistant)
- (Philippines) Franco Atienza
- (Philippines) Danny Ildefonso

Team manager

- (Philippines) Richard Bachmann^{[a]}

Legend

- (C) Team captain
- (CI) Commissioner's Cup Import
- (GI) Governors' Cup Import
- (EI) EASL Import
- (DP) Unsigned draft pick
- (FA) Free agent
- (IN) Inactive
- (S) Suspended
- (R) Rookie
- Injured

Roster

- ^{a} also serves as Alaska's board governor.

== Philippine Cup ==
=== Eliminations ===
==== Standings ====
Pos	Team	W	L	PCT	GB	Qualification
1	Barangay Ginebra San Miguel	8	3	.727 (Note: Head-to-head record: Barangay Ginebra 1–0 Phoenix)	—	Twice-to-beat in quarterfinals
2	Phoenix Super LPG Fuel Masters	8	3	.727	—	Twice-to-beat in quarterfinals
3	TNT Tropang Giga	7	4	.636 (Note: Head-to-head quotient: TNT 1.074, San Miguel 1.023, Meralco 0.992, Alaska 0.959, Magnolia 0.955)	1	Twice-to-beat in quarterfinals
4	San Miguel Beermen	7	4	.636	1	Twice-to-beat in quarterfinals
5	Meralco Bolts	7	4	.636	1	Twice-to-win in quarterfinals
6	Alaska Aces	7	4	.636	1	Twice-to-win in quarterfinals
7	Magnolia Hotshots Pambansang Manok	7	4	.636	1	Twice-to-win in quarterfinals
8	Rain or Shine Elasto Painters	6	5	.545	2	Twice-to-win in quarterfinals
9	NLEX Road Warriors	5	6	.455	3	
10	Blackwater Elite	2	9	.182	6	
11	NorthPort Batang Pier	1	10	.091 (Note: Head-to-head record: NorthPort 1–0 Terrafirma)	7	
12	Terrafirma Dyip	1	10	.091	7	

Source: PBA.ph
Rules for classification: 1) winning percentage; 2) if two teams are tied, head to head record; if three or more teams are tied, head-to-head goal average (quotient), if tied for 8th, one-game playoff; 3) overall quotient 4) coin toss

==== Game log ====
2020 PBA Philippine Cup game log
Total: 7–4
October: 5–3

Game	Date	Opponent	Score	High points	High rebounds	High assists	Location Attendance	Record
1	October 11	TNT	L 95–100	Abu Tratter (17)	Robbie Herndon (8)	JVee Casio (9)	AUF Sports Arena & Cultural Center	0–1
2	October 14	Meralco	L 81–93	Jeron Teng (25)	Robbie Herndon (8)	4 players (2)	AUF Sports Arena & Cultural Center	0–2
3	October 17	Magnolia	W 87–81	Jeron Teng (19)	Abu Tratter (9)	Vic Manuel (4)	AUF Sports Arena & Cultural Center	1–2
4	October 20	Blackwater	W 120–82	Barkley Eboña (24)	Vic Manuel (9)	Jeron Teng (7)	AUF Sports Arena & Cultural Center	2–2
5	October 22	Rain or Shine	W 89–88	Vic Manuel (18)	Vic Manuel (7)	Jeron Teng (8)	AUF Sports Arena & Cultural Center	3–2
6	October 24	San Miguel	L 88–92	Manuel, Eboña (18)	Abu Tratter (13)	Jeron Teng (7)	AUF Sports Arena & Cultural Center	3–3
7	October 27	Terrafirma	W 99–96	Vic Manuel (18)	Abu Tratter (11)	Casio, Eboña (3)	AUF Sports Arena & Cultural Center	4–3
8	October 29	Phoenix Super LPG	W 105–97	Vic Manuel (24)	Rodney Brondial (10)	Robbie Herndon (7)	AUF Sports Arena & Cultural Center	5–3

November : 2–1

Game	Date	Opponent	Score	High points	High rebounds	High assists	Location Attendance	Record
9	November 3	Barangay Ginebra	L 81–87	Vic Manuel (17)	Rodney Brondial (9)	Vic Manuel (4)	AUF Sports Arena & Cultural Center	5–4
10	November 6	NorthPort	W 102–94	Brondial, Tratter (16)	Rodney Brondial (10)	Jeron Teng (6)	AUF Sports Arena & Cultural Center	6–4
11	November 9	NLEX	W 122–119 OT	Maverick Ahanmisi (25)	Brondial, Ahanmisi (12)	Jeron Teng (5)	AUF Sports Arena & Cultural Center	7–4

=== Playoffs ===
==== Bracket ====
Quarterfinals (Top 4 twice-to-beat)
1	Barangay Ginebra	81
8	Rain or Shine	73
4	San Miguel	71	68
5	Meralco	78	90
2	Phoenix Super LPG	89
7	Magnolia	88
3	TNT	104
6	Alaska	83

Semifinals (Best-of-5)
1	Barangay Ginebra	3
5	Meralco	2
2	Phoenix Super LPG	2
3	TNT	3

Finals (Best-of-7)
1	Barangay Ginebra	4
3	TNT	1
