= Samboy Lim PBA Sportsmanship award =

Annual Philippine Basketball Association award

The Samboy Lim Philippine Basketball Association (PBA) Sportsmanship award (formerly known as the PBA Sportsmanship award) is an annual Philippine Basketball Association (PBA) award given since the 1993 PBA season, to the player who most "exemplifies the ideals of sportsmanship on the court—ethical behavior, fair play and integrity".

Since its inception in 1993, the award has been given to 19 different players and was won thrice by Rey Evangelista, Freddie Abuda and Gabe Norwood. The award was renamed on October 6, 2016 after Samboy Lim, the first recipient of this award.

== Winners ==
^	Denotes player who is still active in the PBA
*	Inducted into the PBA Hall of Fame
Player (X)	Denotes the number of times the player has received the award
Team (X)	Denotes the number of times a player from this team has won

Season	Player	Position	Country of birth	Team	Ref.
1993	Samboy Lim*	Shooting guard	Philippines	San Miguel Beermen	
1994	Jerry Codiñera	Center	Philippines	Purefoods Tender Juicy Hotdogs	
1995	Rey Evangelista	Small forward	Philippines	Purefoods Tender Juicy Hotdogs (2)	
1996	Jerry Codiñera (2)	Center	Philippines	Purefoods Corned Beef Cowboys (3)	
1997	Freddie Abuda	Power forward	Philippines	San Miguel Beermen (2)	
1998	Freddie Abuda (2)	Power forward	Philippines	San Miguel Beermen (3)	
1999	Rey Evangelista (2)	Small forward	Philippines	Purefoods Tender Juicy Hotdogs (4)	
2000	Freddie Abuda (3)	Power forward	Philippines	San Miguel Beermen (4)	
2001	Rey Evangelista (3)	Small forward	Philippines	Purefoods Tender Juicy Hotdogs (5)	
2002	Paolo Mendoza	Point guard	Philippines	Sta. Lucia Realtors	
2003	Patrick Fran	Point guard	Philippines	Talk 'N Text Phone Pals	
2004–05	Dondon Hontiveros	Shooting guard / Small forward	Philippines	San Miguel Beermen (5)	
2005–06	Tony dela Cruz	Small forward	United States	Alaska Aces	
2006–07	Gary David	Shooting guard	Philippines	Air21 Express	
2007–08	Ali Peek	Center / Power forward	United States	Talk 'N Text Phone Pals (2)	
2008–09	Ryan Reyes	Shooting guard	Philippines	Sta. Lucia Realtors	
2009–10	Cyrus Baguio	Shooting guard	Philippines	Alaska Aces (2)	
2010–11	Sonny Thoss	Center	Papua New Guinea	Alaska Aces (3)	
2011–12	JVee Casio	Point guard	Philippines	Powerade Tigers	
2012–13	JVee Casio (2)	Point guard	Philippines	Alaska Aces (4)	
2013–14	Willie Miller	Shooting guard	Philippines	Barako Bull Energy (2)	
2014–15	June Mar Fajardo^	Center	Philippines	San Miguel Beermen (6)	
2015–16	June Mar Fajardo^ (2)	Center	Philippines	San Miguel Beermen (7)	
2016–17	Gabe Norwood	Small forward	United States	Rain or Shine Elasto Painters	
2017–18	Gabe Norwood (2)	Small forward	United States	Rain or Shine Elasto Painters (2)	
2019	Gabe Norwood (3)	Small forward	United States	Rain or Shine Elasto Painters (3)	
2020	Scottie Thompson^	Shooting guard / Point guard	Philippines	Barangay Ginebra San Miguel	
2021	Kevin Alas^	Point guard / Shooting guard	Philippines	NLEX Road Warriors	
2022–23	Kevin Alas^ (2)	Point guard / Shooting guard	Philippines	NLEX Road Warriors (2)	
2023–24	Paul Zamar^	Shooting guard / Point guard	Philippines	NorthPort Batang Pier	
2024–25	Gian Mamuyac^	Shooting guard	Philippines	Rain or Shine Elasto Painters (4)	

== Multiple-time winners ==
Total	Player
3	Freddie Abuda
3	Rey Evangelista
3	Gabe Norwood
2	Kevin Alas
2	JVee Casio
2	Jerry Codiñera
2	June Mar Fajardo
