= Russel Escoto =

Filipino basketball player

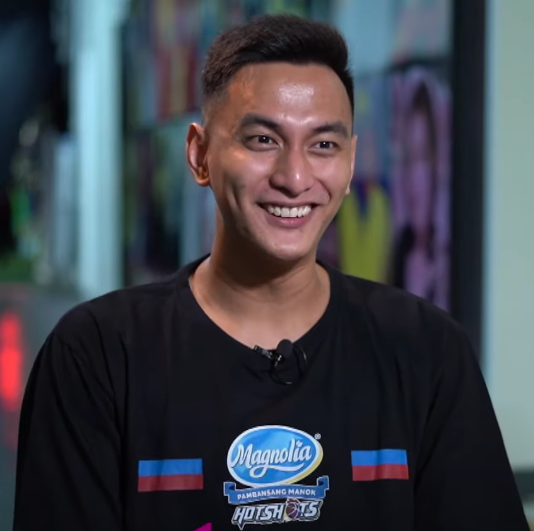
- Escoto in 2022

No. 88 – Magnolia Chicken Timplados Hotshots
- Position: Center / power forward
- League: PBA

Personal information
- Born: December 4, 1992 (age 33) Angeles City, Philippines
- Listed height: 6 ft 6 in (1.98 m)
- Listed weight: 200 lb (91 kg)

Career information
- High school: AUF (Angeles City); FEU Diliman (Quezon City)
- College: FEU
- PBA draft: 2016: Special draft
- Drafted by: Mahindra Floodbuster
- Playing career: 2016–present

Career history
- 2016–2019: Mahindra Floodbuster / Kia Picanto / Columbian Dyip
- 2019: NorthPort Batang Pier
- 2020: San Miguel Beermen
- 2022–present: Magnolia Chicken Timplados Hotshots

Career highlights
- UAAP champion (2015)

Russel Dalusung Escoto (born December 4, 1992) is a Filipino professional basketball player for the Magnolia Chicken Timplados Hotshots of the Philippine Basketball Association (PBA).

== PBA career statistics ==
Legend
GP	Games played	MPG	Minutes per game	FG%	Field-goal percentage
3FG%	3-point field-goal percentage	4P%	4-point field-goal percentage	FT%	Free-throw percentage
RPG	Rebounds per game	APG	Assists per game	SPG	Steals per game
BPG	Blocks per game	PPG	Points per game	127	Career high

As of the end of 2025–26 season

=== Season-by-season averages ===
Year	Team	GP	MPG	FG%	3P%	4P%	FT%	RPG	APG	SPG	BPG	PPG
2016–17	Mahindra	10	18.0	.468	.667	—	.800	4.0	.1	.2	.1	8.0
2017–18	Kia / Columbian	26	14.4	.348	.244	—	.529	3.0	.7	.3	.2	3.9
2019	Columbian	36	10.7	.437	.377	—	.677	2.3	.5	.1	.1	3.9
2019	NorthPort	36	10.7	.437	.377	—	.677	2.3	.5	.1	.1	3.9
2020	San Miguel	13	12.2	.279	.063	—	.417	3.2	.2	.2	.7	2.3
2021	Magnolia	7	4.7	.389	.200	—	1.000	.1	—	—	—	2.7
2022–23	Magnolia	27	9.0	.500	.263	—	.357	1.8	.4	.1	—	3.9
2023–24	Magnolia	20	6.8	.475	.412	—	.556	1.5	.3	.3	.1	2.5
2024–25	Magnolia	14	6.4	.481	.273	—	1.000	1.6	.4	.1	—	2.4
2025–26	Magnolia	12	7.6	.500	.300	.000	.500	1.1	.2	.1	.2	3.4
Career		165	10.3	.428	.308	.000	.608	2.2	.4	.1	.1	3.6

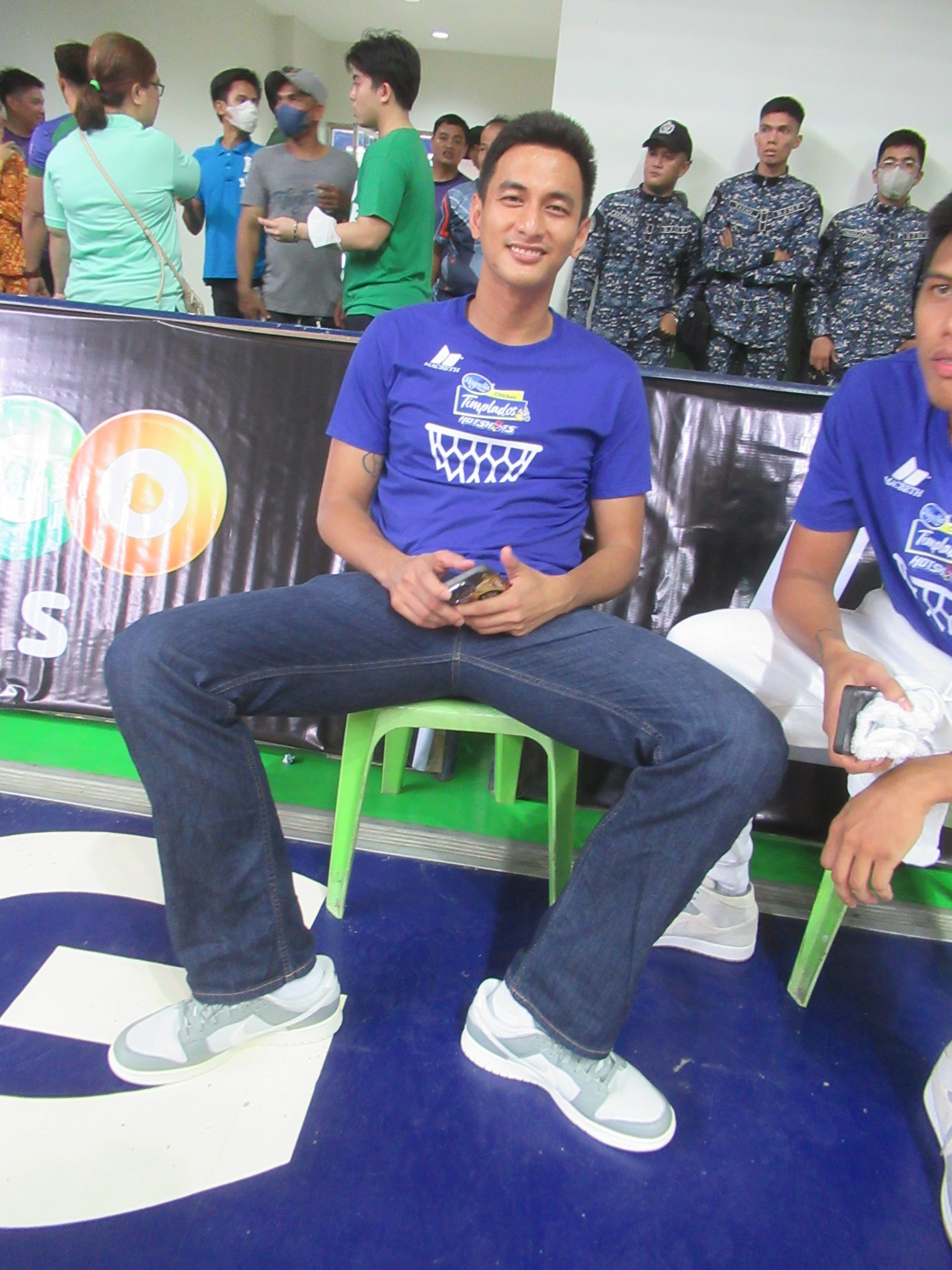
Russel Escoto in 2023
