= Terrafirma Dyip all-time roster =

List of players of PBA franchise

The following is a list of players, both past and current, who appeared in at least one game for the Kia/Mahindra/Columbian/Terrafirma PBA franchise. Statistics are accurate as of the 2024 PBA Philippine Cup.

== Players ==
^	Denotes player who is currently on the Dyip roster								
^{+}	Denotes player who played as an import for the Dyip								
G	Guard	G/F	Guard-forward	F	Forward	F/C	Forward-center	C	Center

Player	Place of birth	Pos.	From	Yrs.	Seasons	Statistics					Ref.
Player	Place of birth	Pos.	From	Yrs.	Seasons	GP	MP	PTS	REB	AST	Ref.
Dylan Ababou	Philippines	G/F	UST	1	2017–2018	27	263	75	11	5	
Roosevelt Adams	United States	F	College of Idaho	2	2020–2021	22	541	213	155	13	
Keith Agovida	Philippines	G/F	Arellano	3	2016; 2019–2020	39	352	105	66	26	
Raymond Aguilar	Philippines	F	National-U	1	2016	12	100	39	29	1	
Gelo Alolino^	Philippines	G	National-U	3	2021–present	47	614	213	68	73	
Chad Alonzo	Philippines	F	Adamson	1	2014	6	64	5	15	4	
Khapri Alston^{+}	United States	F	Midwestern State	1	2019	11	486	314	200	35	
Rich Alvarez	Philippines	F	Ateneo	2	2014–2016	43	520	93	112	30	
Jeckster Apinan	Philippines	F	José Rizal	1	2016–2017	7	95	41	20	4	
Ryan Araña	Philippines	G	De La Salle	1	2016–2017	11	185	68	41	12	
Leo Avenido	Philippines	G	Far Eastern	1	2015	16	232	89	21	14	
Hyram Bagatsing	United States	G	De La Salle	2	2014–2016	44	594	186	68	63	
Christian Balagasay	Philippines	F/C	Letran	3	2020–2022	35	287	43	46	6	
Jason Ballesteros	Philippines	C	San Sebastian	2	2016–2017	48	608	83	170	6	
Juneric Baloria	Philippines	G	UPHSD	1	2015	1	3	0	1	0	
Kyle Barone^{+}	United States	C	Idaho	1	2019	4	161	108	60	12	
Jeremy Bartolo	United States	F	Cal State San Bernardino	1	2015	1	4	0	0	0	
Bon Batiller	Philippines	G	Letran	3	2020–2022	26	234	94	19	34	
JR Buensuceso	United States	G	BYU–Hawaii	1	2014–2015	29	530	143	74	65	
Michael Burtscher	Switzerland	F/C	Clearwater Christian	1	2014–2015	11	118	27	19	2	
Alex Cabagnot	Philippines	G	Hawaiʻi–Hilo	2	2021–2023	24	621	208	97	128	
Roider Cabrera	Philippines	F	Adamson	2	2018–2019	34	212	84	25	10	
Andreas Cahilig^	Sweden	F	EARIST	6	2018–present	141	2,774	662	522	137	
JP Calvo^	Philippines	G	Letran	5	2019–present	112	1,845	504	221	258	
Eric Camson^	Philippines	F	Adamson	7	2017–present	153	2,298	1,096	552	116	
KG Canaleta	Philippines	F	UE	1	2015–2016	32	809	373	122	31	
Prince Caperal	Philippines	F/C	Arellano	2	2017–2018	20	180	43	41	5	
Kemark Cariño^	Philippines	F/C	San Beda	1	2023–present	21	408	140	101	10	
JR Cawaling	Philippines	F	Far Eastern	1	2015	14	198	66	18	11	
Reden Celda	Philippines	G	National-U	5	2016–2021	113	1,918	785	212	191	
Reil Cervantes	Philippines	F	Far Eastern	1	2014–2015	17	451	233	82	27	
Jet Chang^{+}	Taiwan	G	BYU–Hawaii	1	2015	11	318	140	41	13	
Jackson Corpuz	Philippines	F	Philippine Christian	3	2017–2019	73	1,426	600	397	62	
Markeith Cummings^{+}	United States	F	Kennesaw State	1	2017	7	229	189	59	20	
Jopher Custodio	Philippines	G/F	MLQU	1	2014–2015	5	103	30	13	0	
Ed Daquioag	Philippines	G	UST	3	2021–2023	28	407	129	42	45	
Gary David	Philippines	G	Lyceum	1	2016–2017	8	97	52	10	2	
Thomas De Thaey^{+}	Belgium	F	NC State	1	2023–2024	10	368	172	131	11	
Leo de Vera	Philippines	G/F	San Sebastian	1	2016	4	23	2	3	0	
Karl Dehesa	Philippines	G	Waldorf	2	2014–2016	49	1,265	456	148	99	
Jason Deutchman	Philippines	F	San Diego State	2	2015; 2016–2017	36	513	154	105	23	
Michael DiGregorio	Philippines	G	McKendree	2	2015–2017	35	575	194	44	31	
Nico Elorde	Philippines	G	Ateneo	2	2016–2017	34	447	116	69	48	
Brian Enriquez	United States	G/F	William Woods	1	2022	7	39	0	8	1	
Joseph Eriobu	Hong Kong	F	Mapúa	1	2016–2017	11	184	73	41	4	
Russel Escoto	Philippines	F/C	Far Eastern	3	2016–2019	57	781	267	165	27	
Jeepy Faundo	Philippines	C	UST	2	2019–2020	37	335	82	80	3	
Kevin Ferrer^	Philippines	F	UST	1	2023–present	6	127	28	8	3	
John Fields^{+}	United States	C	Tennessee	1	2018	8	330	233	153	28	
Lervin Flores	Philippines	F/C	Arellano	1	2019	7	37	11	7	3	
Joseph Gabayni	Philippines	C	Lyceum	4	2019–2023	65	923	307	250	39	
Jon Jon Gabriel	Philippines	F/C	San Lorenzo	2	2018–2019	25	209	97	57	6	
Bong Galanza	Philippines	G/F	UE	3	2016–2018	32	372	116	39	10	
Matt Ganuelas-Rosser	Philippines	G/F	Cal Poly Pomona	1	2021	15	387	81	56	47	
Augustus Gilchrist^{+}	United States	F/C	South Florida	1	2016	11	440	226	131	26	
Isaac Go^	Philippines	F/C	Ateneo	3	2021–present	33	708	257	151	31	
Javi Gómez de Liaño	Philippines	G/F	Philippines	2	2022–2024	58	1,304	607	240	94	
John Grospe	Philippines	F	José Rizal	1	2022–2023	10	29	2	1	2	
Rey Guevarra	Philippines	G/F	Letran	1	2016–2017	9	94	25	10	3	
Bradwyn Guinto	Philippines	F/C	San Sebastian	1	2015–2016	34	530	174	148	16	
Antonio Hester^{+}	United States	F/C	Mobile	1	2021	11	429	311	139	35	
Stephen Holt^	United States	G	Saint Mary's	1	2023–present	24	957	408	165	132	
Paulo Hubalde	Philippines	G	UE	1	2015–2016	15	202	45	31	9	
Kenneth Ighalo	Philippines	F	Mapúa	1	2014–2015	16	192	32	29	10	
Chito Jaime	Philippines	F	AMA	3	2014–2017	37	369	143	87	11	
Jan Jamon	Philippines	F	Emilio Aguinaldo	1	2017–2018	7	79	30	8	3	
Paolo Javelona	Philippines	G	National-U	1	2022	12	148	28	16	17	
Geron Johnson^{+}	United States	G	Memphis	1	2017	4	167	136	32	26	
Glenn Khobuntin	Philippines	F	National-U	4	2017–2020	82	1,751	603	211	83	
Jerramy King	United States	G	Long Beach State	2	2018–2019	27	802	391	138	77	
James Laput	Australia	C	De La Salle	1	2021	10	104	26	26	3	
Carlo Lastimosa	Philippines	G	St. Benilde	1	2018	19	277	115	25	34	
Eddie Laure	Philippines	F	Adamson	1	2015	8	75	18	13	4	
Rudy Lingganay	Philippines	G	UE	1	2014	7	133	55	17	17	
Alex Mallari	United States	G/F	Lewis–Clark State	1	2016–2017	18	572	280	115	78	
A. J. Mandani	Canada	G	Missouri S&T	1	2016	2	36	0	5	6	
Rashawn McCarthy	United States	G	SUNY–Old Westbury	4	2017–2021	83	2,664	1,110	374	348	
Justin Melton	Philippines	G	Mount Olive	1	2021	3	30	7	4	2	
Taylor Miller	United States	G	Westminster (UT)	1	2023–2024	9	61	22	8	9	
Allen Mina^	Philippines	G/F	Letran	2	2022–present	43	396	132	53	16	
Joshua Munzon	United States	G/F	Cal State LA	2	2021–2022	31	867	382	113	74	
Hamady N'Diaye^{+}	Senegal	C	Rutgers	1	2015	11	471	194	167	13	
Josan Nimes	Philippines	G/F	Mapúa	1	2016–2017	17	180	43	26	19	
Alex Nuyles	Philippines	G/F	Adamson	1	2015	10	177	57	25	4	
Tommy Olivario^	Philippines	G	Letran	1	2023–present	11	65	4	6	8	
Manny Pacquiao	Philippines	G	NDDU	3	2014–2017	10	59	13	5	2	
Alvin Padilla	Philippines	G	Philippines	1	2014–2015	9	143	36	27	8	
Philip Paniamogan	Philippines	G	José Rizal	3	2016–2018	39	641	248	72	52	
Philip Paredes	Philippines	F/C	De La Salle	1	2015	2	21	5	5	0	
Jonathan Parreño	Philippines	G	WMSU	1	2014–2015	5	15	4	2	2	
Kyle Pascual	Philippines	F/C	San Beda	3	2014–2016; 2021–2022	53	860	235	131	19	
CJ Perez	British Hong Kong	G	Lyceum	2	2019–2020	44	1,656	954	319	158	
John Pinto	Philippines	G	Arellano	1	2015–2016	29	469	96	77	72	
Eliud Poligrates	Philippines	G	Southwestern-U	1	2014–2015	11	149	42	16	15	
Lester Prosper^{+}	Dominica	C	SUNY–Old Westbury	2	2019; 2022	17	721	522	274	38	
Aldrech Ramos^	Philippines	F	Far Eastern	5	2015–2016; 2020–present	123	2,805	1,085	539	131	
Peter John Ramos^{+}	Puerto Rico	C	Puerto Rico	1	2015	11	476	395	233	33	
Bogs Raymundo	Philippines	C	San Beda	1	2014–2015	10	138	27	29	3	
LA Revilla	Philippines	G	De La Salle	3	2014–2017	93	2,453	842	346	373	
Jay-R Reyes	Philippines	F/C	Philippines	2	2017–2019	36	591	175	137	29	
Eder Saldua	Philippines	F	Mindanao	1	2014	5	74	9	17	2	
Nico Salva	Philippines	F	Ateneo	1	2016–2017	31	385	109	61	15	
Paul Sanga	Philippines	G/F	Far Eastern	1	2014–2015	6	43	7	8	1	
Louie Sangalang^	Philippines	F	Letran	1	2023–present	17	275	101	52	18	
Dan Sara	Philippines	G	San Beda	1	2017–2018	25	275	54	33	28	
Eric Suguitan	Philippines	C	UE	1	2014	1	2	0	1	0	
Cyrus Tabi	Philippines	G	RTU	1	2019	6	23	4	2	3	
Paolo Taha	Philippines	G/F	St. Benilde	1	2016	13	303	138	41	18	
Jeric Teng	Philippines	G	UST	1	2016–2017	16	108	41	17	5	
Hans Thiele	Philippines	F/C	UE	1	2014–2015	26	363	120	94	11	
Juami Tiongson^	Philippines	G	Ateneo	5	2019–present	98	3,202	1,663	321	307	
Ronald Tubid	Philippines	G/F	UE	1	2017–2018	30	526	200	96	34	
Terrence Tumalip	Philippines	G	TIP	1	2022	8	48	6	5	1	
Joshua Webb	Philippines	G	De La Salle	3	2014–2016	38	321	109	47	10	
James White^{+}	United States	F	Georgia Tech	2	2016–2017	17	664	438	244	25	
Jordan Williams^{+}	United States	G	North Texas	1	2023	11	479	378	102	41	
Akeem Wright^{+}	United States	G/F	Kansas State	1	2018	11	457	249	131	63	
Keith Wright^{+}	United States	F	Harvard	1	2017	7	289	137	107	17	
Mark Yee	Philippines	F	San Sebastian (Cavite)	4	2015–2018	100	1,571	593	423	57	
Iman Zandi	Iran	G	IAU	1	2016	5	98	33	6	7	
