= 2014–15 Kia Carnival season =

2014–15 Kia Carnival (PBA team) season
- Head coach: Manny Pacquiao
- Owner(s): Columbian Autocar Corporation

Philippine Cup results
- Record: 1–10 (9.1%)
- Place: 11th
- Playoff finish: Did not qualify

Commissioner's Cup results
- Record: 4–7 (36.4%)
- Place: 11th
- Playoff finish: Did not qualify

Governors' Cup results
- Record: 5–6 (45.5%)
- Place: 9th
- Playoff finish: Did not qualify

Kia Carnival (PBA team) seasons

The 2014–15 Kia Carnival season was the 1st season of the franchise in the Philippine Basketball Association (PBA). The team was known as Kia Sorento for the Philippine Cup.

== Key dates ==
- June 9: Manny Pacquiao was officially named the head coach of Kia.
- July 18: The 2014 PBA Expansion Draft took place in Microtel Acropolis, in Libis, Quezon City.
- August 24: The 2014 PBA Draft will take place in Midtown Atrium, Robinson Place Manila. On the same day, Columbian Autocar Corporation president Gina Domingo announced that they took the moniker "Sorento", the name of their top-selling sports utility vehicle in the Philippines and United States.
- January 23: The team changed their moniker to Kia Carnival for the Commissioner's Cup.

== Expansion draft picks ==
Pick	Player	Pos.	Nationality	Previous team	PBA years^{[a]}
2	Reil Cervantes	F	Philippines	Barako Bull Energy	3
4	Mike Burtscher	F	Switzerland	Air21 Express	5
6	Hans Thiele	C/F	Philippines	Barako Bull Energy	4
8	Alvin Padilla	G	Philippines	Barangay Ginebra San Miguel	n/a
10	Jai Reyes	G	Philippines	Talk 'N Text Tropang Texters	5
12	Paul Sanga		Philippines	undrafted	n/a
14	Bogs Raymundo	G	Philippines	GlobalPort Batang Pier	2
16	Eder Saldua		Philippines	undrafted	n/a
18	Nic Belasco	F	United States	Alaska Aces	17
20	LA Revilla	G	Philippines	GlobalPort Batang Pier	1
22	Joshua Webb	G	Philippines	Air21 Express	1
24	Chad Alonzo	F	Philippines	GlobalPort Batang Pier	8

== Draft picks ==
Round	Pick	Player	Position	Nationality	PBA D-League team	College
1	11	Manny Pacquiao	G	Philippines	none	NDDU
2	24	Kyle Pascual	F/C	Philippines	NLEX (D-League)	SBC
3	25	Rene Pacquiao	F	Philippines	Hog's Breath Razorbacks	SWU
3	28	Kenneth Ighalo	F	Philippines	Cagayan Valley Rising Suns	MIT
3	29	Paolo Taha	G	Philippines	Boracay Rum Waves	CSB
3	31	Jeremy Bartolo	F	Philippines	none	Cal State San Bernardino
3	32	Anthony Gavieres	G/F	Philippines	none	VCU
3	35	Richard Cole	F/G	United States	none	NU
3	36	Giorgio Umali	G/F	Philippines	none	SPU
3	37	Jonathan Banal	G	Philippines	Wang's Basketball Couriers	MIT
3	38	Michael Acuña	G	Philippines	none	Perpetual
3	39	Paolo Romero	G/F	Philippines	Jumbo Plastic Linoleum Giants	CSB
3	40	Francis Bercede	G	Philippines	none	USC

== Roster ==
2014–15 Kia Carnival roster
Players
Coaches

Pos.	#	POB	Name	Height	Weight	DOB (YYYY–MM–DD)	From
F	1	(Philippines)	Hans Thiele	6 ft 6 in (1.98 m)	200 lb (91 kg)	1984-02-02	UE
G	2	(Philippines)	LA Revilla	5 ft 9 in (1.75 m)	165 lb (75 kg)	1989-11-30	De La Salle
F	3	(Philippines)	Kenneth Ighalo (R)	6 ft 3 in (1.91 m)	175 lb (79 kg)	1989-01-11	Mapúa
G	6	(United States)	Karl Dehesa	6 ft 4 in (1.93 m)	175 lb (79 kg)	1987-05-24	Waldorf
F	7	(United States)	Jason Deutchman	6 ft 7 in (2.01 m)	215 lb (98 kg)	1986-09-27	San Diego State
F	8	(Philippines)	JR Cawaling	6 ft 4 in (1.93 m)	190 lb (86 kg)	1987-08-15	Far Eastern
G/F	9	(Philippines)	Alex Nuyles	6 ft 3 in (1.91 m)	180 lb (82 kg)	1989-07-25	Adamson
F	10	(Philippines)	Joshua Webb	6 ft 3 in (1.91 m)	180 lb (82 kg)	1989-11-14	De La Salle
G	17	(Philippines)	Manny Pacquiao (injured) (IN)	5 ft 7 in (1.70 m)	143 lb (65 kg)	1978-12-17	NDDU
F	21	(Japan)	Rich Alvarez (C)	6 ft 5 in (1.96 m)	210 lb (95 kg)	1980-10-30	Ateneo
G	24	(United States)	JR Buensuceso	5 ft 10 in (1.78 m)	165 lb (75 kg)	1988-04-21	BYU–Hawaii
F/C	25	(United States)	Kyle Pascual (R)	6 ft 6 in (1.98 m)	200 lb (91 kg)	1990-04-13	San Beda
F	27	(Philippines)	Mark Yee	6 ft 4 in (1.93 m)	170 lb (77 kg)	1982-01-04	San Sebastian (Cavite)
G	30	(Philippines)	Leo Avenido	6 ft 3 in (1.91 m)	170 lb (77 kg)	1978-09-25	Far Eastern
G	32	(Philippines)	Hyram Bagatsing	6 ft 1 in (1.85 m)	190 lb (86 kg)	1985-02-18	De La Salle
F/C	63	(Switzerland)	Mike Burtscher (IN)	6 ft 6 in (1.98 m)	210 lb (95 kg)	1985-03-08	Clearwater Christian

Head coach

- (Philippines) Manny Pacquiao (NDDU)

Assistant coach(es)

- (Philippines) Chito Victolero (Mapúa)
- (United States) Rob Wainwright (Solano CC)
- (Philippines) Chris Gavina
- (Philippines) Romulo Orillosa (Adamson)
- (Philippines) Marlon Martin
- (Philippines) Joe Lipa (UP Diliman)(consultant)

Team manager

- (Philippines) Eric Pineda

Legend

- (C) Team captain
- (CI) Commissioner's Cup Import
- (GI) Governors' Cup Import
- (EI) EASL Import
- (DP) Unsigned draft pick
- (FA) Free agent
- (IN) Inactive
- (S) Suspended
- (R) Rookie
- Injured

== Philippine Cup ==
=== Eliminations ===
==== Standings ====
Pos	Team	W	L	PCT	GB	Qualification
1	San Miguel Beermen	9	2	.818 (Note: Head-to-head record: San Miguel 1–0 Rain or Shine)	—	Advance to semifinals
2	Rain or Shine Elasto Painters	9	2	.818	—	Advance to semifinals
3	Alaska Aces	8	3	.727 (Note: Head-to-head record: Alaska 1–0 Talk 'N Text)	1	Twice-to-beat in the quarterfinals
4	Talk 'N Text Tropang Texters	8	3	.727	1	Twice-to-beat in the quarterfinals
5	Barangay Ginebra San Miguel	6	5	.545 (Note: Head-to-head quotient: Barangay Ginebra 1.07, Meralco 1.06, Purefoods Star 0.89)	3	Twice-to-beat in the quarterfinals
6	Meralco Bolts	6	5	.545	3	Twice-to-beat in the quarterfinals
7	Purefoods Star Hotshots	6	5	.545	3	Twice-to-win in the quarterfinals
8	GlobalPort Batang Pier	5	6	.455	4	Twice-to-win in the quarterfinals
9	Barako Bull Energy	4	7	.364 (Note: Head-to-head record: Barako Bull 1–0 NLEX)	5	Twice-to-win in the quarterfinals
10	NLEX Road Warriors	4	7	.364	5	Twice-to-win in the quarterfinals
11	Kia Sorento	1	10	.091	8	
12	Blackwater Elite	0	11	.000	9	

Source: PBA.ph

==== Game log ====
2014–15 PBA Philippine Cup game log
October

Game	Date	Opponent	Score	High points	High rebounds	High assists	Location Attendance	Record
1	October 19, 2014	Blackwater	80–66	Revilla (23)	Thiele (9)	Lingganay (5)	Philippine Arena	1–0
2	October 25, 2014	Ginebra	55–87	Lingganay (14)	Alvarez (6)	Cervantes (2)	Smart Araneta Coliseum	1–1
3	October 29, 2014	Rain or Shine	88–117	Cervantes (18)	Cervantes (8)	Revilla (6)	Smart Araneta Coliseum	1–2

November

Game	Date	Opponent	Score	High points	High rebounds	High assists	Location Attendance	Record
4	November 4, 2014	GlobalPort	79–84	Thiele (18)	Thiele (8)	Lingganay (6)	Smart Araneta Coliseum	1–3
5	November 7, 2014	Talk 'N Text	62–85	Dehesa (14)	Saldua (6)	Revilla (3)	Smart Araneta Coliseum	1–4
6	November 11, 2014	Alaska	75–85	Cervantes (18)	Webb (6)	Buensuceso (4)	Cuneta Astrodome	1–5
7	November 16, 2014	Barako	71–87	Revilla (21)	Alvarez (8)	Revilla (5)	Smart Araneta Coliseum	1–6
8	November 19, 2014	San Miguel	74–90	Cervantes (16)	Buensuceso (9)	Revilla (5)	Smart Araneta Coliseum	1–7
9	November 26, 2014	Purefoods Star	77–88	Cervantes (14)	Raymundo (6)	Revilla (4)	Smart Araneta Coliseum	1–8

December

Game	Date	Opponent	Score	High points	High rebounds	High assists	Location Attendance	Record
10	December 3, 2014	Meralco	93–99	Cervantes (18)	Alvarez (7)	Poligrates (4)	Smart Araneta Coliseum	1–9
11	December 7, 2014	NLEX	80–88	Cervantes (34)	Cervantes (7)	Buensuceso (4)	Smart Araneta Coliseum	1–10

2014–15 schedule

=== Playoffs ===
==== Bracket ====
Quarterfinals (1st phase)
(#3 twice to beat)
3	Alaska	82
10	NLEX	78
(#6 twice to beat)
6	Meralco	77
7	Purefoods Star	65
(#4 twice to beat)
4	Talk 'N Text	105
9	Barako Bull	76
(#5 twice to beat)
5	Barangay Ginebra	95
8	GlobalPort	78

Quarterfinals (2nd phase) (single elimination)
3	Alaska	87
6	Meralco	69
4	Talk N Text	83
5	Barangay Ginebra	67

Semifinals (best-of-7)
2	Rain or Shine	2
3	Alaska	4
1	San Miguel	4
4	Talk N' Text	0

Finals (best-of-7)
3	Alaska	3
1	San Miguel	4

== Commissioner's Cup ==
=== Eliminations ===
==== Standings ====
Pos	Team	W	L	PCT	GB	Qualification
1	Rain or Shine Elasto Painters	8	3	.727 (Note: Head-to-head quotient: Rain or Shine 1.025, Talk 'N Text 1.010, Purefoods 0.969)	—	Twice-to-beat in the quarterfinals
2	Talk 'N Text Tropang Texters	8	3	.727	—	Twice-to-beat in the quarterfinals
3	Purefoods Star Hotshots	8	3	.727	—	Best-of-three quarterfinals
4	NLEX Road Warriors	6	5	.545 (Note: Head-to-head record: NLEX 1–0 Meralco)	2	Best-of-three quarterfinals
5	Meralco Bolts	6	5	.545	2	Best-of-three quarterfinals
6	Alaska Aces	5	6	.455 (Note: Head-to-head quotient: Alaska 1.021, Barako Bull 1.019, Barangay Ginebra 0.960)	3	Best-of-three quarterfinals
7	Barako Bull Energy	5	6	.455	3	Twice-to-win in the quarterfinals
8	Barangay Ginebra San Miguel	5	6	.455	3	Twice-to-win in the quarterfinals
9	San Miguel Beermen	4	7	.364 (Note: Head-to-head quotient: San Miguel 1.011, GlobalPort 0.995, Kia 0.994)	4	
10	GlobalPort Batang Pier	4	7	.364	4	
11	Kia Carnival	4	7	.364	4	
12	Blackwater Elite	3	8	.273	5	

Source: PBA.ph

==== Game log ====
2014–15 PBA Commissioner's Cup game log
January

Game	Date	Opponent	Score	High points	High rebounds	High assists	Location Attendance	Record
1	January 27, 2015	GlobalPort	89–100	Ramos (41)	Ramos (20)	Ramos (6)	Mall of Asia Arena	0–1
2	January 30, 2015	Meralco	80–90	Ramos (34)	Ramos (21)	Buensuceso (4)	Cuneta Astrodome	0–2

February

Game	Date	Opponent	Score	High points	High rebounds	High assists	Location Attendance	Record
3	February 4, 2015	San Miguel	88–78	Ramos (22)	Yee (9)	Revilla (6)	Smart Araneta Coliseum	1–2
4	February 8, 2015	Barako	79–84	Ramos (34)	Ramos (20)	Poligrates (3)	Smart Araneta Coliseum	1–3
5	February 13, 2015	Ginebra	92–100	Ramos (37)	Ramos (22)	Revilla (5)	Smart Araneta Coliseum	1–4
6	February 18, 2015	Purefoods Star	95–84	Ramos (32)	Ramos (26)	Revilla (7)	Smart Araneta Coliseum	2–4
7	February 25, 2015	Talk 'N Text	106–103	Ramos (24)	Ramos (25)	Ramos (9)	Smart Araneta Coliseum	3–4
8	February 28, 2015	Blackwater	104–115	Ramos (49)	Ramos (14)	Revilla (7)	Smart Araneta Coliseum	3–5

March

Game	Date	Opponent	Score	High points	High rebounds	High assists	Location Attendance	Record
9	March 3, 2015	Alaska	103–89	Ramos (36)	Ramos (33)	Buensuceso (6)	Smart Araneta Coliseum	4–5
10	March 18, 2015	NLEX	86–102	Ramos (41)	Ramos (23)	Revilla (5)	Smart Araneta Coliseum	4–6
11	March 22, 2015	Rain or Shine	99–119	Ramos (41)	Ramos (21)	Revilla (5)	Smart Araneta Coliseum	4–7

2014–15 schedule

=== Playoffs ===
==== Bracket ====
Quarterfinals
(#1 twice-to-beat)
1	Rain or Shine	92
8	Barangay Ginebra	91
(best-of-3)
4	NLEX	0
5	Meralco	2
(#2 twice-to-beat)
2	Talk 'N Text	127
7	Barako Bull	97
(best-of-3)
3	Purefoods Star	2
6	Alaska	0

Semifinals (best-of-5)
1	Rain or Shine	3
5	Meralco	0
2	Talk 'N Text	3
3	Purefoods Star	1

Finals (best-of-7)
1	Rain or Shine	3
2	Talk 'N Text	4

== Governors' Cup ==
=== Eliminations ===
==== Standings ====
Pos	Team	W	L	PCT	GB	Qualification
1	Alaska Aces	8	3	.727 (Note: Head-to-head record: Alaska 1–0 San Miguel)	—	Twice-to-beat in the quarterfinals
2	San Miguel Beermen	8	3	.727	—	Twice-to-beat in the quarterfinals
3	Rain or Shine Elasto Painters	7	4	.636 (Note: Head-to-head record: Rain or Shine 1–0 GlobalPort)	1	Twice-to-beat in the quarterfinals
4	GlobalPort Batang Pier	7	4	.636	1	Twice-to-beat in the quarterfinals
5	Star Hotshots	6	5	.545 (Note: Head-to-head record: Barako Bull 1–0 Star)	2	Twice-to-win in the quarterfinals
6	Barako Bull Energy	6	5	.545	2	Twice-to-win in the quarterfinals
7	Meralco Bolts	5	6	.455 (Note: Head-to-head quotient: Meralco 1.13, Barangay Ginebra 1.00, Kia 0.95, Talk 'N Text 0.93)	3	Twice-to-win in the quarterfinals
8	Barangay Ginebra San Miguel	5	6	.455	3	Twice-to-win in the quarterfinals
9	Kia Carnival	5	6	.455	3	
10	Talk 'N Text Tropang Texters	5	6	.455	3	
11	NLEX Road Warriors	3	8	.273	5	
12	Blackwater Elite	1	10	.091	7	

Source: PBA.ph

==== Game log ====
2014–15 PBA Governors' Cup game log
May

Game	Date	Opponent	Score	High points	High rebounds	High assists	Location Attendance	Record
1	May 6, 2015	San Miguel	83–78	N'Diaye (21)	Thiele (8)	Revilla (7)	Smart Araneta Coliseum	1–0
2	May 13, 2015	Ginebra	98–105	Revilla (20)	N'Diaye (25)	Revilla (6)	Smart Araneta Coliseum	1–1
3	May 18, 2015	NLEX	85–82	Revilla (15)	N'Diaye (8)	Revilla (5)	Ynares Sports Arena	2–1
4	May 26, 2015	Blackwater	83–76	Chang (25)	N'Diaye (23)	Chang (4)	Cuneta Astrodome	3–1
5	May 30, 2015	Purefoods Star	80–89	Chang (17)	N'Diaye (18)	Revilla (6)	Smart Araneta Coliseum	3–2

June

Game	Date	Opponent	Score	High points	High rebounds	High assists	Location Attendance	Record
6	June 5, 2015	Alaska	63–101	N'Diaye (18)	N'Diaye (7)	Pascual (2)	Smart Araneta Coliseum	3–3
7	June 10, 2015	Barako	71–68	Chang (15)	N'Diaye (14)	Revilla (5)	Smart Araneta Coliseum	4–3
8	June 14, 2015	GlobalPort	94–102	N'Diaye (29)	N'Diaye (13)	Bagatsing (3)	Smart Araneta Coliseum	4–4
9	June 17, 2015	Rain or Shine	90–94	N'Diaye (31)	N'Diaye (21)	Revilla (5)	Smart Araneta Coliseum	4–5
10	June 19, 2015	Talk 'N Text	86–102	Dehesa (19)	N'Diaye (13)	Revilla (5)	Smart Araneta Coliseum	4–6
11	June 24, 2015	Meralco	88–85	N'Diaye (24)	N'Diaye (19)	Revilla (5)	Smart Araneta Coliseum	5–6

2014–15 schedule

=== Playoffs ===
==== Bracket ====
Quarterfinals
(#1 twice to beat)
1	Alaska	114
8	Ginebra	108
(#4 twice to beat)
4	GlobalPort	73	94
5	Star	126	101
(#2 twice to beat)
2	San Miguel	99	102
7	Meralco	106	86
(#3 twice to beat)
3	Rain or Shine	134**
6	Barako Bull	132

Semifinals (best-of-5)
1	Alaska	3
5	Star	0
2	San Miguel	3
3	Rain or Shine	1

Finals (best-of-7)
1	Alaska	0
2	San Miguel	4

*Game went into overtime^{[a]}

^{a} The number of asterisks denotes the number of overtime(s) occurred.

== Transactions ==
=== Trades ===
==== Philippine Cup ====
November 27, 2014	To Kia Eliud Poligrates	To NLEX Rudy Lingganay

=== Recruited imports ===
Tournament	Name	Debuted	Last game	Record
Commissioner's Cup	(Puerto Rico) Peter John Ramos	January 27 (vs Kia)	March 22 (vs Rain or Shine)	4–7
Governors' Cup	(Senegal) Hamady N'Diaye	May 6 (vs San Miguel)	June 24 (vs Meralco)	5–6
Governors' Cup	(Chinese Taipei) Jet Chang*	May 6 (vs San Miguel)	June 24 (vs Meralco)	5–6

(* Asian import)
