= List of Terrafirma Dyip seasons =

The Terrafirma Dyip joined the Philippine Basketball Association (PBA) in 2014 after Columbian Autocar Corporation was granted an expansion team. The team began play as the Kia Sorento in the 2014–15 PBA season. In 2020, the team was sold to Terra Firma Realty Development Corporation.

== Records per conference ==
Note: Statistics are correct as of the end of the 2025 PBA Philippine Cup.

Conference champions	Conference runners-up	Conference semifinalists	Playoff berth

Season	Conference	Elimination round						Playoffs	
Season	Conference	Finish	Played	Wins	Losses	Win %	GB	Round	Results
Kia Sorento
2014–15 (team)	Philippine	11th	11	1	10	.091	8	Did not qualify	
Kia Carnival
2014–15 (team)	Commissioner's	11th	11	4	7	.364	4	Did not qualify	
2014–15 (team)	Governors'	9th	11	5	6	.455	3	Did not qualify	
Mahindra Enforcer
2015–16 (team)	Philippine	11th	11	2	9	.182	7	Did not qualify	
2015–16 (team)	Commissioner's	9th	11	4	7	.364	4	Did not qualify	
2015–16 (team)	Governors'	5th	11	6	5	.545	4	Fourth seed playoff Quarterfinals	lost vs. Meralco, 99–104 lost vs. Meralco, 82–105 (Note: Opposing team had twice-to-beat advantage.)
Mahindra Floodbuster
2016–17 (team)	Philippine	10th	11	3	8	.273	7	Did not qualify	
2016–17 (team)	Commissioner's	10th	11	3	8	.273	6	Did not qualify	
Kia Picanto
2016–17 (team)	Governors'	12th	11	0	11	.000	9	Did not qualify	
2017–18 (team)	Philippine	12th	11	1	10	.091	7	Did not qualify	
Columbian Dyip
2017–18 (team)	Commissioner's	9th	11	4	7	.364	5	Did not qualify	
2017–18 (team)	Governors'	12th	11	1	10	.091	8	Did not qualify	
2019 (team)	Philippine	10th	11	4	7	.364	5	Did not qualify	
2019 (team)	Commissioner's	11th	11	3	8	.273	7	Did not qualify	
2019 (team)	Governors'	10th	11	4	7	.364	4	Did not qualify	
Terrafirma Dyip
2020 (team)	Philippine	12th	11	1	10	.091	7	Did not qualify	
2021 (team)	Philippine	10th	11	4	7	.364	6	Did not qualify	
2021 (team)	Governors'	11th	11	2	9	.182	7	Did not qualify	
2022–23 (team)	Philippine	12th	11	0	11	.000	9	Did not qualify	
2022–23 (team)	Commissioner's	13th	12	1	11	.083	9	Did not qualify	
2022–23 (team)	Governors'	11th	11	2	9	.182	8	Did not qualify	
2023–24 (team)	Commissioner's	10th	11	2	9	.182	7	Did not qualify	
2023–24 (team)	Philippine	8th	11	5	6	.455	5	Eighth seed playoff Quarterfinals	won vs. NorthPort, 96–104 lost vs. San Miguel in two games
2024–25 (team)	Governors'	6th (Group A)	10	1	9	.100	7	Did not qualify	
2024–25 (team)	Commissioner's	13th	12	1	11	.083	8	Did not qualify	
2024–25 (team)	Philippine	12th	11	1	10	.091	7	Did not qualify	
Elimination round record			276	65	222	.226		2 playoff appearances	
Playoff record			5	2	3	.400		0 finals appearances	
Cumulative record			292	67	225	.229		0 championships	

== Records per season ==
Note: Statistics are correct as of the end of the 2025 PBA Philippine Cup.

Season	Stage	Played	Wins	Losses	Win %	Best finish
2014–15 (team)	Elimination round	33	10	23	.303	Elimination round (9th place)
2014–15 (team)	Playoffs	Did not qualify				Elimination round (9th place)
2014–15 (team)	Overall	33	10	23	.303	Elimination round (9th place)
2015–16 (team)	Elimination round	33	12	21	.364	Quarterfinals
2015–16 (team)	Playoffs	2	0	2	.000	Quarterfinals
2015–16 (team)	Overall	35	12	23	.343	Quarterfinals
2016–17 (team)	Elimination round	33	6	27	.182	Elimination round (10th place)
2016–17 (team)	Playoffs	Did not qualify				Elimination round (10th place)
2016–17 (team)	Overall	33	6	27	.182	Elimination round (10th place)
2017–18 (team)	Elimination round	33	6	27	.182	Elimination round (9th place)
2017–18 (team)	Playoffs	Did not qualify				Elimination round (9th place)
2017–18 (team)	Overall	33	6	27	.182	Elimination round (9th place)
2019 (team)	Elimination round	33	11	22	.333	Elimination round (10th place)
2019 (team)	Playoffs	Did not qualify				Elimination round (10th place)
2019 (team)	Overall	33	11	22	.333	Elimination round (10th place)
2020 (team)	Elimination round	11	1	10	.091	Elimination round (12th place)
2020 (team)	Playoffs	Did not qualify				Elimination round (12th place)
2020 (team)	Overall	11	1	10	.091	Elimination round (12th place)
2021 (team)	Elimination round	22	6	16	.273	Elimination round (10th place)
2021 (team)	Playoffs	Did not qualify				Elimination round (10th place)
2021 (team)	Overall	22	6	16	.273	Elimination round (10th place)
2022–23 (team)	Elimination round	34	3	31	.088	Elimination round (11th place)
2022–23 (team)	Playoffs	Did not qualify				Elimination round (11th place)
2022–23 (team)	Overall	34	3	31	.088	Elimination round (11th place)
2023–24 (team)	Elimination round	22	7	15	.318	Quarterfinals
2023–24 (team)	Playoffs	3	2	1	.667	Quarterfinals
2023–24 (team)	Overall	25	9	16	.360	Quarterfinals
2024–25 (team)	Elimination round	33	3	30	.091	Elimination round
2024–25 (team)	Playoffs	Did not qualify				Elimination round
2024–25 (team)	Overall	33	3	30	.091	Elimination round
