= 2015–16 Mahindra Enforcer season =

- Head coach: Manny Pacquiao
- Owner: Columbian Autocar Corporation

Philippine Cup results
- Record: 2–9 (18.2%)
- Place: 11th
- Playoff finish: Did not qualify

Commissioner's Cup results
- Record: 4–7 (36.4%)
- Place: 9th
- Playoff finish: Did not qualify

Governors' Cup results
- Record: 6–5 (54.5%)
- Place: 5th
- Playoff finish: Quarterfinalists (lost to Meralco in one game)

Mahindra Enforcer seasons

The 2015–16 Mahindra Enforcer season was the 2nd season of the franchise in the Philippine Basketball Association (PBA).

== Key dates ==
- July 16: Columbian Autocar Corporation (CAC) announced that they changed their team name from Kia Carnival to Mahindra Enforcers.
- August 23: The 2015 PBA draft took place in Midtown Atrium, Robinson Place Manila.

== Draft picks ==
Round	Pick	Player	Position	Nationality	PBA D-League team	College
1	2	Troy Rosario	PF	Philippines	Hapee Fresh Fighters	NU
2	14	Bradwyn Guinto	C	Philippines	Cebuana Lhuillier Gems	SSC-R
3	24	Leo de Vera	SF	United States	Tanduay Light Rhum Masters	SSC-R
4	35	Michael DiGregorio	SG	United States	KeraMix Mixers	McKendree
5	44	Alli Austria	SG	United States	Cagayan Valley Rising Suns	San Francisco State
6	49	Roberto Hainga	C	Philippines	MP Hotel Warriors	UST
7	52	Michael Abad	C/PF	Philippines	LiverMarin Guardians	Mapúa

== Roster ==
2015–16 Mahindra Enforcer roster
Players
Coaches

Pos.	#	POB	Name	Height	Weight	DOB (YYYY–MM–DD)	From
G/F	0	(Philippines)	Paolo Taha	6 ft 0 in (1.83 m)	180 lb (82 kg)	1990–12–05	St. Benilde
F/C	1	(Philippines)	Aldrech Ramos	6 ft 6 in (1.98 m)	190 lb (86 kg)	1988–04–03	Far Eastern
G	2	(Philippines)	L.A. Revilla	5 ft 8 in (1.73 m)	146 lb (66 kg)	1989–11–30	De La Salle
F/C	5	(Philippines)	Bradwyn Guinto	6 ft 6 in (1.98 m)	220 lb (100 kg)	1991–10–20	San Sebastian
G	7	(United States)	Michael DiGregorio	6 ft 1 in (1.85 m)	185 lb (84 kg)	1990–12–12	McKendree
G	8	(Philippines)	Philip Paniamogan	6 ft 0 in (1.83 m)	180 lb (82 kg)	1991–05–30	José Rizal
F	9	(Philippines)	Niño Canaleta (C)	6 ft 6 in (1.98 m)	200 lb (91 kg)	1982–02–12	UE
F	10	(Philippines)	Joshua Webb (IN)	6 ft 2 in (1.88 m)	200 lb (91 kg)	1989–11–14	De La Salle
G	14	(Philippines)	Pedrito Galanza	6 ft 2 in (1.88 m)	185 lb (84 kg)	1992–12–21	UE
G	17	(Philippines)	Manny Pacquiao	5 ft 6 in (1.68 m)	151 lb (68 kg)	1978–12–17	NDDU
F	23	(Philippines)	Keith Agovida	6 ft 2 in (1.88 m)	170 lb (77 kg)	1990–02–14	Arellano
F	27	(Philippines)	Mark Yee	6 ft 3 in (1.91 m)	170 lb (77 kg)	1982–01–04	San Sebastian (Cavite)
F	28	(Philippines)	Chito Jaime	6 ft 4 in (1.93 m)	200 lb (91 kg)	1983–10–21	AMA
G	32	(United States)	Hyram Bagatsing	6 ft 1 in (1.85 m)	190 lb (86 kg)	1985–02–18	De La Salle
C	81	(Philippines)	Jason Ballesteros	6 ft 6 in (1.98 m)	220 lb (100 kg)	1985–10–07	San Sebastian

Head coach

- (Philippines) Manny Pacquiao

Assistant coach(es)

- (Philippines) Chris Gavina (1st Assistant)
- (Philippines) Romulo Orillosa
- (United States) Rob Wainwright
- (Philippines) Alex Angeles
- (Japan) Richard Alvarez
- (Philippines) Marlon Martin
- (Philippines) Joe Lipa (Consultant)

Team manager

- (Philippines) Eric Pineda
- (Philippines) Joe Ramos (Assistant)

Legend

- (C) Team captain
- (CI) Commissioner's Cup Import
- (GI) Governors' Cup Import
- (EI) EASL Import
- (DP) Unsigned draft pick
- (FA) Free agent
- (IN) Inactive
- (S) Suspended
- (R) Rookie
- Injured

Roster

== Philippine Cup ==
=== Eliminations ===
==== Standings ====
Pos	Team	W	L	PCT	GB	Qualification
1	Alaska Aces	9	2	.818 (Note: Head-to-head record: Alaska 1–0 San Miguel)	—	Advance to semifinals
2	San Miguel Beermen	9	2	.818	—	Advance to semifinals
3	Rain or Shine Elasto Painters	8	3	.727	1	Twice-to-beat in the quarterfinals
4	Barangay Ginebra San Miguel	7	4	.636 (Note: Head-to-head record: Barangay Ginebra 1–0 GlobalPort)	2	Twice-to-beat in the quarterfinals
5	GlobalPort Batang Pier	7	4	.636	2	Twice-to-beat in the quarterfinals
6	TNT Tropang Texters	6	5	.545	3	Twice-to-beat in the quarterfinals
7	NLEX Road Warriors	5	6	.455 (Note: Head-to-head record: NLEX 1–0 Barako Bull)	4	Twice-to-win in the quarterfinals
8	Barako Bull Energy	5	6	.455	4	Twice-to-win in the quarterfinals
9	Star Hotshots	4	7	.364	5	Twice-to-win in the quarterfinals
10	Blackwater Elite	3	8	.273	6	Twice-to-win in the quarterfinals
11	Mahindra Enforcer	2	9	.182	7	
12	Meralco Bolts	1	10	.091	8	

Source: PBA.ph

== Commissioner's Cup ==
=== Eliminations ===
==== Standings ====
Pos	Team	W	L	PCT	GB	Qualification
1	San Miguel Beermen	8	3	.727 (Note: Head-to-head record: San Miguel 1–0 Meralco)	—	Twice-to-beat in the quarterfinals
2	Meralco Bolts	8	3	.727	—	Twice-to-beat in the quarterfinals
3	Alaska Aces	7	4	.636 (Note: Head-to-head quotient: Alaska 1.18, Barangay Ginebra 1.03, Rain or Shine 0.84)	1	Best-of-three quarterfinals
4	Barangay Ginebra San Miguel	7	4	.636	1	Best-of-three quarterfinals
5	Rain or Shine Elasto Painters	7	4	.636	1	Best-of-three quarterfinals
6	Tropang TNT	6	5	.545	2	Best-of-three quarterfinals
7	NLEX Road Warriors	5	6	.455 (Note: Head-to-head record: NLEX 1–0 Star)	3	Twice-to-win in the quarterfinals
8	Star Hotshots	5	6	.455	3	Twice-to-win in the quarterfinals
9	Mahindra Enforcer	4	7	.364	4	
10	Blackwater Elite	3	8	.273 (Note: Head-to-head quotient: Blackwater 1.04, Phoenix 0.99, GlobalPort 0.98)	5	
11	Phoenix Fuel Masters	3	8	.273	5	
12	GlobalPort Batang Pier	3	8	.273	5	

Source: PBA.ph

== Governors' Cup ==
=== Eliminations ===
==== Standings ====
Pos	Team	W	L	PCT	GB	Qualification
1	TNT KaTropa	10	1	.909	—	Twice-to-beat in the quarterfinals
2	San Miguel Beermen	8	3	.727 (Note: Head-to-head record: San Miguel 1–0 Barangay Ginebra)	2	Twice-to-beat in the quarterfinals
3	Barangay Ginebra San Miguel	8	3	.727	2	Twice-to-beat in the quarterfinals
4	Meralco Bolts	6	5	.545 (Note: Head-to-head quotient: Meralco 1.039, Mahindra 1.017, Alaska 0.950; fourth seed playoff: Meralco 104–99 Mahindra)	4	Twice-to-beat in the quarterfinals
5	Mahindra Enforcer	6	5	.545	4	Twice-to-win in the quarterfinals
6	Alaska Aces	6	5	.545	4	Twice-to-win in the quarterfinals
7	NLEX Road Warriors	5	6	.455 (Note: Head-to-head quotient: NLEX 1.04, Rain or Shine 1.03, Phoenix 0.93; eighth seed playoff: Phoenix 105–94 Rain or Shine)	5	Twice-to-win in the quarterfinals
8	Phoenix Fuel Masters	5	6	.455	5	Twice-to-win in the quarterfinals
9	Rain or Shine Elasto Painters	5	6	.455	5	
10	GlobalPort Batang Pier	4	7	.364	6	
11	Star Hotshots	2	9	.182	8	
12	Blackwater Elite	1	10	.091	9	

Source: PBA.ph

==== Bracket ====
Quarterfinals (Top 4 twice-to-beat)
1	TNT	136
8	Phoenix	124
4	Meralco	105
5	Mahindra	82
2	San Miguel	114
7	NLEX	110
3	Barangay Ginebra	109
6	Alaska	104

Semifinals (Best-of-5)
1	TNT	1
4	Meralco	3
2	San Miguel	2
3	Barangay Ginebra	3

Finals (Best-of-7)
4	Meralco	2
3	Barangay Ginebra	4

== Transactions ==
=== Trades ===
Preseason

August 25, 2015	To Mahindra Niño Canaleta and Aldrech Ramos (from NLEX); Robert Reyes (from Talk 'n Text)	To NLEX Kevin Alas (from Talk 'n Text via Mahindra)	To Talk 'N Text Troy Rosario
October 7, 2015	To Mahindra Juneric Baloria; 2016 and 2017 second-round picks (from NLEX)	To Meralco 2016 and 2017 second-round picks (from Mahindra)	To NLEX Sean Anthony (from Meralco via Mahindra)
April 29, 2016	To Mahindra Keith Agovida and Paolo Taha	To Globalport Karl Dehesa	To Blackwater Roi Sumang

=== Recruited imports ===
Tournament	Name	Debuted	Last game	Record
Commissioner's Cup	Augustus Gilchrist	February 12 (vs. GlobalPort)	April 13 (vs. Star)	4–7
Governors' Cup	(United States) James White	July 15 (vs. Star)	September 24 (vs. Meralco)	6–7
Governors' Cup	(Iran) Iman Zandi*	July 15 (vs. Star)	August 12 (vs. Phoenix)	4–1
