= Kyle Pascual =

Filipino basketball player

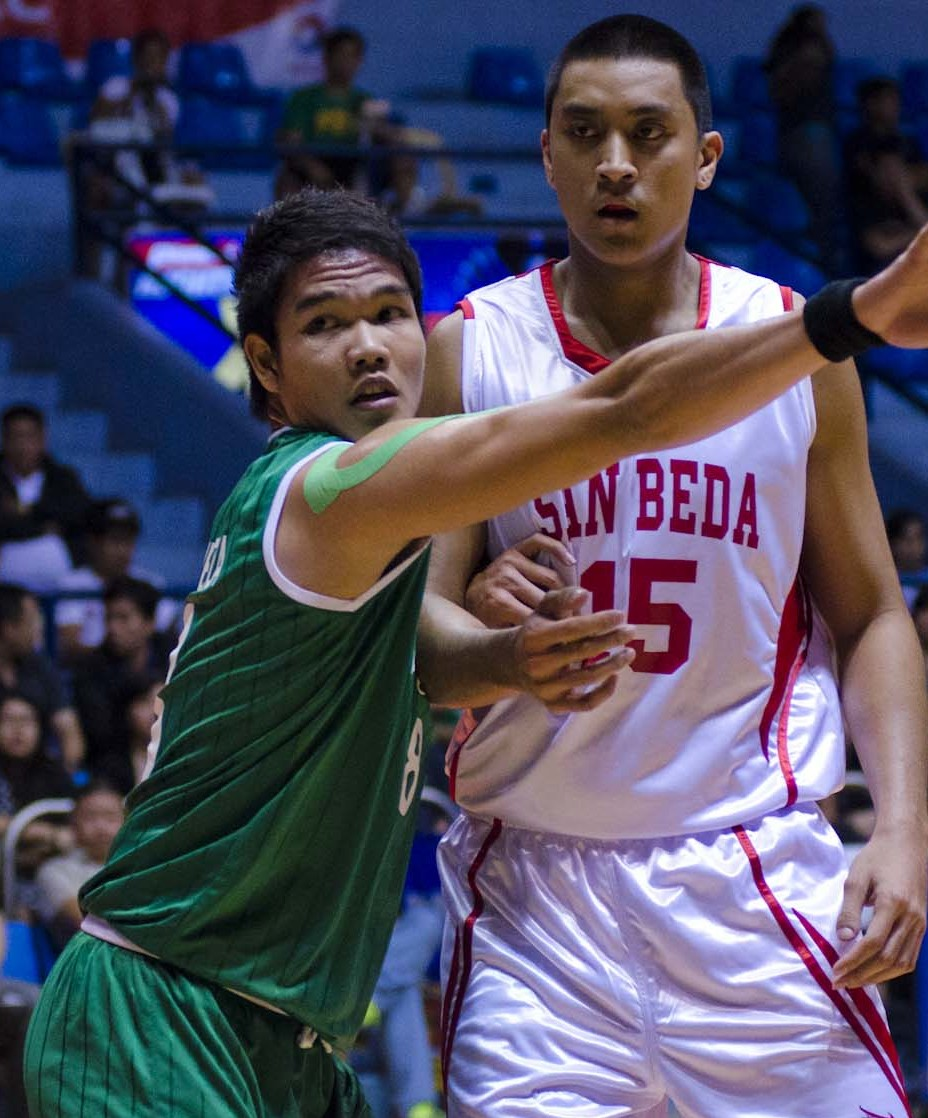
- Pascual (right) in 2011

No. 32 – Meralco Bolts
- Position: Center / power forward
- League: PBA

Personal information
- Born: April 13, 1990 (age 36) Anaheim, California, U.S.
- Listed height: 6 ft 6 in (1.98 m)
- Listed weight: 213 lb (97 kg)

Career information
- High school: Esperanza (Anaheim, California)
- College: San Beda (2010–2014)
- PBA draft: 2014: 2nd round, 24th overall pick
- Drafted by: Kia Sorento
- Playing career: 2014–present

Career history
- 2014–2016: Kia Sorento/Carnival / Mahindra Enforcer
- 2016–2017: Blackwater Elite
- 2017–2021: Star/Magnolia Hotshots
- 2021–2022: Terrafirma Dyip
- 2022–present: Meralco Bolts

Career highlights
- 2× PBA champion (2018 Governors', 2024 Philippine); 5× NCAA Philippines champion (2010–2014)

Kyle Nicholas Pacana Pascual (born April 13, 1990) is a Filipino professional basketball player for the Meralco Bolts of the Philippine Basketball Association (PBA).

== College career ==
Pascual is one of the few players to win a championship in all his five years of playing in the NCAA for the San Beda College Red Lions. He is the first NCAA player to notch the feat since Rommel Adducul, who was the star of the San Sebastian team that won five straight titles from 1993 to 1997.

== Professional career ==
Pascual was drafted 24th overall by Kia in the 2014 PBA draft.

On March 20, 2016, Pascual was traded to the Blackwater Elite for Jason Ballesteros.

On September 10, 2017, Pascual, along with Riego Gamalinda, was traded to the Star Hotshots for Allein Maliksi and Chris Javier.

On November 25, 2021, Pascual, along with Justin Melton, was traded back to the Terrafirma Dyip (formerly Kia) for James Laput.

On May 26, 2022, Pascual, who became a free agent after declining Terrafirma's extension offer, signed a two-year deal with the Meralco Bolts.

== PBA career statistics ==
Legend
GP	Games played	MPG	Minutes per game	FG%	Field-goal percentage
3FG%	3-point field-goal percentage	4P%	4-point field-goal percentage	FT%	Free-throw percentage
RPG	Rebounds per game	APG	Assists per game	SPG	Steals per game
BPG	Blocks per game	PPG	Points per game	127	Career high

As of the end of 2025–26 season

=== Season-by-season averages ===
Year	Team	GP	MPG	FG%	3P%	4P%	FT%	RPG	APG	SPG	BPG	PPG
2014–15	Kia	30	16.1	.402	.000	—	.714	2.5	.5	.3	.2	3.6
2015–16	Mahindra	26	22.4	.417	.375	—	.659	4.5	.3	.3	.4	6.9
2015–16	Blackwater	26	22.4	.417	.375	—	.659	4.5	.3	.3	.4	6.9
2016–17	Blackwater	34	16.7	.471	.333	—	.615	3.2	.6	.3	.3	4.8
2016–17	Star	34	16.7	.471	.333	—	.615	3.2	.6	.3	.3	4.8
2017–18	Magnolia	39	7.4	.400	.000	—	.867	1.3	.3	.3	.2	2.2
2019	Magnolia	30	7.5	.408	.200	—	.583	1.2	.4	.1	.4	1.6
2020	Magnolia	3	12.7	.333	—	—	—	1.3	—	.3	.3	1.3
2021	Magnolia	24	9.3	.481	.200	—	.476	1.3	.3	.2	.0	2.6
2021	Terrafirma	24	9.3	.481	.200	—	.476	1.3	.3	.2	.0	2.6
2022–23	Meralco	36	9.9	.413	.000	—	.706	1.6	.4	.2	.1	1.8
2023–24	Meralco	30	8.4	.421	—	—	.636	1.6	.1	.1	.2	1.3
2024–25	Meralco	19	9.9	.382	—	—	.600	2.1	.5	.1	.3	1.7
2025–26	Meralco	20	7.6	.333	—	—	.571	1.4	.2	.1	.1	.8
Career		291	11.5	.423	.231	—	.644	2.0	.4	.2	.2	2.7
