= Bradwyn Guinto =

Filipino-Australian basketball player

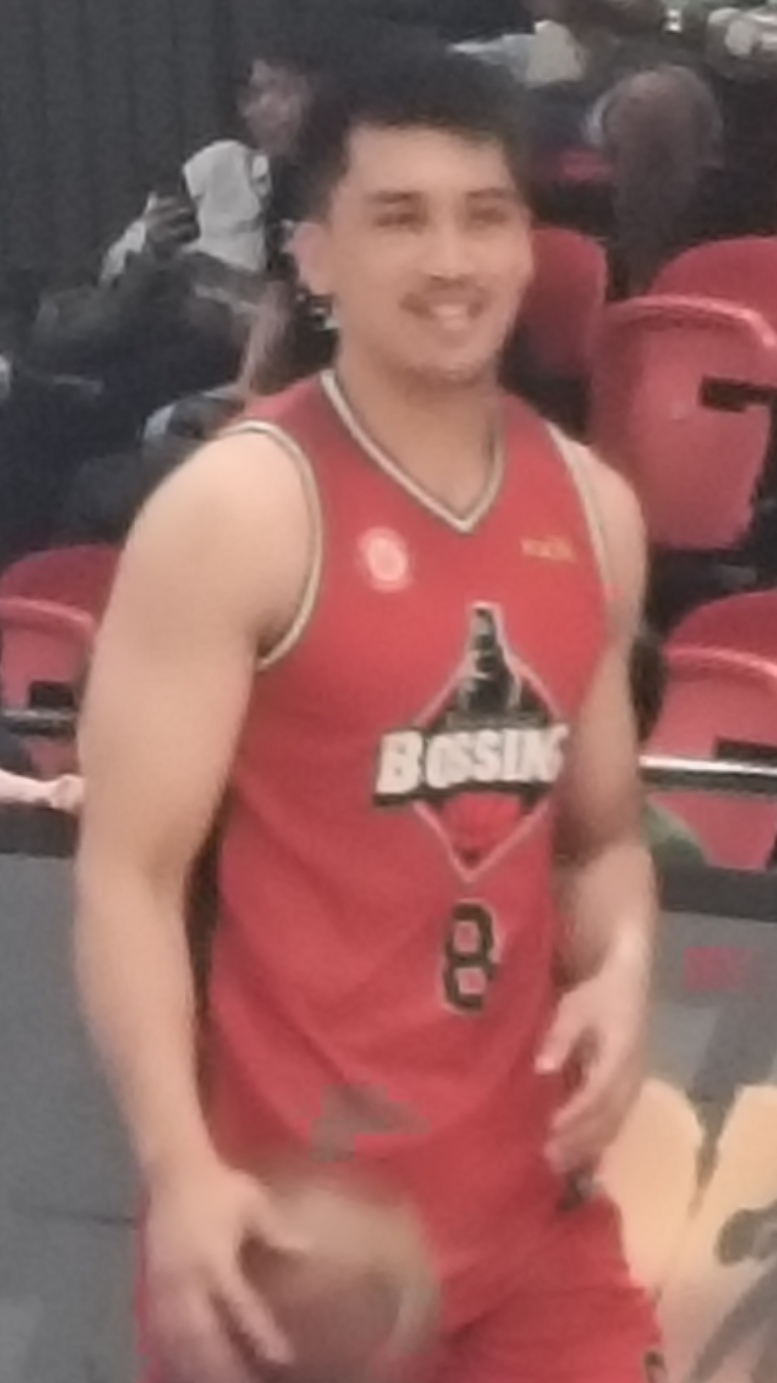
- Guinto with the Blackwater Bossing in 2025

Free agent
- Position: Center / power forward

Personal information
- Born: October 20, 1991 (age 35) Orani, Bataan, Philippines
- Listed height: 6 ft 6 in (1.98 m)
- Listed weight: 220 lb (100 kg)

Career information
- College: San Sebastian
- PBA draft: 2015: 2nd round, 14th overall pick
- Drafted by: Mahindra Enforcer
- Playing career: 2015–present

Career history
- 2015–2016: Mahindra Enforcer
- 2016–2017: NLEX Road Warriors
- 2017–2020: NorthPort Batang Pier
- 2021–2022: Rain or Shine Elasto Painters
- 2023: Converge FiberXers
- 2023–2026: Blackwater Bossing

Career highlights
- PBA All-Star (2017); NCAA Mythical Five (2014); 2× NCAA All-Defensive Team (2014–2015)

Bradwyn M. Guinto (born October 20, 1991) is a Filipino-Australian professional basketball player who last played for the Blackwater Bossing of the Philippine Basketball Association (PBA).

== Early life ==
Guinto was born in Bataan but raised in Melbourne, Australia. His first sport was tennis as he had the chance to watch the Australian Open and grew up idolizing former champion Michael Chang. Aside from tennis, he also tried rugby and cricket. He then made the switch to basketball. He also played in youth leagues in Australia.

== College career ==
Guinto played for the San Sebastian Stags in the NCAA. Expectations in his first year were that his team would be rebuilding, especially after San Sebastian lost its stars Calvin Abueva, Ian Sangalang, and Ronald Pascual. He got his first college career win in Season 89 against the Arellano Chiefs with a double-double of 10 points and 14 rebounds. He then had 15 points in a win against the EAC Generals. Due to typhoid however, he missed some games. He contributed to San Sebastian making the Final Four as the third seed. He was a contender for Rookie of the Year, but lost to Perpetual Altas' Juneric Baloria.

In Season 90, Guinto contributed 14 points and 12 rebounds in a win over the JRU Heavy Bombers that gave his team an early solo lead in the standings. He had 18 points and nine rebounds in a close loss to Perpetual. He bounced back with 13 points and 14 rebounds in a win against the St. Benilde Blazers. The team, however, lost so much games that they fell to second to the last place in the standings. They finished in eighth place. He averaged 14.17 points, 11.11 rebounds, and a block in 30.83 minutes of play in 18 games. He was also named to the Mythical Five and the All-Defensive Team.

The following season, the Stags lost key players and had a new head coach in Rodney Santos (Topex Robinson had been the previous coach). This put more pressure on Guinto to lead the team. After losing their first game of Season 91, he had 17 points, 20 rebounds, four assists, two steals, and two blocks as the Stags rallied to beat the Bombers. In a loss to the Letran Knights, he was limited to just four points. He bounced back with 26 points and 18 rebounds, but the Stags still lost against the Chiefs. He was also an NCAA All-Star that year. Against the league-leading San Beda Red Lions, he had 26 points and the win. He also had 25 points and 11 rebounds in a win over JRU. However, they were not able to make the Final Four. He also lost Defensive Player of the Year to Allwell Oraeme, but made the All-Defensive team.

== Professional career ==
=== Mahindra Enforcer ===
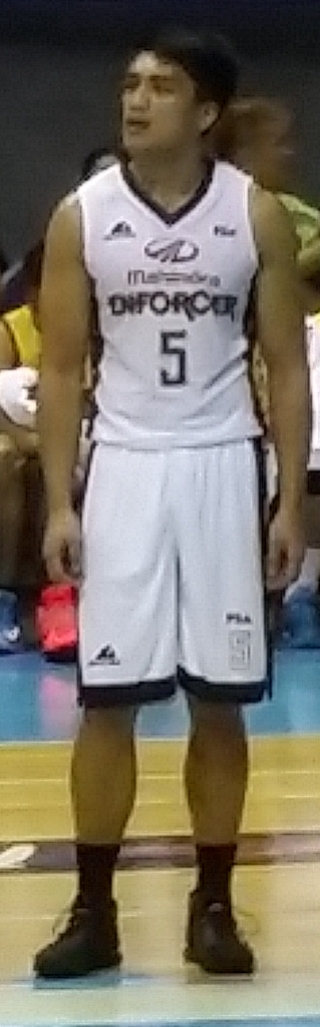
Guinto with the Mahindra Enforcer in 2015

Guinto was drafted by the Mahindra Enforcer with the 14th overall pick in the 2015 PBA draft. He had 17 points on 7-of-9 shooting, 13 boards, three blocks, one steal, and one assist in 33 minutes in a 101–97 loss to the Talk ‘N Text Tropang Texters. He had six points in a loss to the Alaska Aces, but had 19 rebounds, which was the most by any rookie in the last two years. Those performances had him as one of the frontrunners to win Rookie of the Year early in the season. He eventually lost Rookie of the Year to the Meralco Bolts' Chris Newsome.

=== NLEX Road Warriors ===
On November 8, 2016, Guinto, along with Chito Jaime, was traded to the NLEX Road Warriors for Rob Reyes, Jeckster Apinan, and Reden Celda. He debuted with 17 points and 10 rebounds in a win over the Aces. During this time, he was named to the Gilas 5.0 pool. This allowed him to be an All-Star that year.

=== NorthPort Batang Pier ===
On May 6, 2017, Guinto was traded to the NorthPort Batang Pier in a four-team trade. He debuted with eight points and seven rebounds. In 2018, he had 12 points and 10 rebounds against the TNT KaTropa. The following year, he signed a two-year extension with the team. He missed some games due to a knee injury.

=== Rain or Shine Elasto Painters ===
On January 20, 2021, he was traded to the Rain or Shine Elasto Painters for Sidney Onwubere and Clint Doliguez.

On January 25, 2023, Guinto became a free agent after his contract with Rain or Shine expired.

=== Converge FiberXers ===
On January 27, 2023, Guinto signed a two-conference deal with the Converge FiberXers. However, he only played one conference with the FiberXers.

=== Blackwater Bossing ===
In November 2023, Guinto signed with the Blackwater Bossing. According to Bossing head coach Jeffrey Cariaso, Guinto's previous contract with Converge, which has one more conference remaining, was absorbed by the Bossing. On June 8, 2024, he signed a two-year contract extension with the Bossing.

== PBA career statistics ==
Legend
GP	Games played	MPG	Minutes per game	FG%	Field-goal percentage
3FG%	3-point field-goal percentage	4P%	4-point field-goal percentage	FT%	Free-throw percentage
RPG	Rebounds per game	APG	Assists per game	SPG	Steals per game
BPG	Blocks per game	PPG	Points per game	127	Career high

As of the end of 2024–25 season

=== Season-by-season averages ===
Year	Team	GP	MPG	FG%	3P%	4P%	FT%	RPG	APG	SPG	BPG	PPG
2015–16	Mahindra	34	15.6	.600	.000	—	.610	4.4	.5	.3	.4	5.1
2016–17	NLEX	35	21.4	.544	.000	—	.689	5.3	.9	.3	.5	6.9
2016–17	GlobalPort	35	21.4	.544	.000	—	.689	5.3	.9	.3	.5	6.9
2017–18	GlobalPort / NorthPort	35	14.2	.466	.125	—	.600	3.5	.3	.2	.5	4.1
2019	NorthPort	12	19.5	.676	.000	—	.667	3.8	.8	.4	.3	5.3
2020	NorthPort	9	10.5	.571	—	—	.400	1.8	.1	—	.7	2.2
2021	Rain or Shine	15	9.0	.353	—	—	.714	1.7	.1	.2	.3	1.1
2022–23	Rain or Shine	10	5.1	.600	.000	—	.500	.9	—	—	.1	.8
2022–23	Converge	10	5.1	.600	.000	—	.500	.9	—	—	.1	.8
2023–24	Blackwater	22	18.7	.597	—	—	.550	3.5	1.1	.2	.4	4.6
2024–25	Blackwater	28	14.5	.575	—	—	.478	3.1	1.0	.1	.3	3.4
Career		200	15.5	.553	.083	—	.616	3.6	.6	.2	.4	4.3

== Personal life ==
Guinto has a younger brother Jerwyn, who played for San Sebastian's Team B and the Lyceum Pirates. He was drafted by the San Miguel Beermen in the Season 47 draft.
