= Kenneth Ighalo =

Filipino basketball player

Personal information
- Born: January 11, 1989 (age 37)
- Listed height: 6 ft 2 in (1.88 m)
- Listed weight: 175 lb (79 kg)

Career information
- College: Mapúa
- PBA draft: 2014: 3rd round, 28th overall pick
- Drafted by: Kia Sorento
- Playing career: 2014–present
- Position: Small forward
- Number: 17

Career history
- 2014–2015: Kia Sorento/Carnival
- 2017–2024: NLEX Road Warriors
- 2024–2025: Davao Occidental Tigers

Kenneth Kim P. Ighalo (born January 11, 1989) is a Nigerian-Filipino professional basketball player who last played for the Davao Occidental Tigers of the Maharlika Pilipinas Basketball League (MPBL). He was drafted by the Kia Sorento in the 2014 PBA draft. He plays the small forward position.

== PBA career statistics ==
Legend
GP	Games played	MPG	Minutes per game
FG%	Field-goal percentage	3P%	3-point field-goal percentage	FT%	Free-throw percentage
RPG	Rebounds per game	APG	Assists per game	SPG	Steals per game
BPG	Blocks per game	PPG	Points per game	**Bold**	Career high

As of the end of 2022–23 season

=== Season-by-season averages ===
Year	Team	GP	MPG	FG%	3P%	FT%	RPG	APG	SPG	BPG	PPG
2014–15	Kia	16	12.0	.289	.091	.500	1.8	.6	.2	.1	2.0
2016–17	NLEX	9	8.7	.235	.000	.500	1.6	.7	.2	**.2**	1.0
2017–18	NLEX	31	15.9	.396	.304	.771	3.3	.9	.4	.1	5.1
2019	NLEX	**36**	**22.6**	.422	**.391**	.831	**3.6**	**1.2**	**.5**	**.2**	**8.6**
2020	NLEX	10	9.8	.423	.267	—	2.1	.4	.0	.1	2.6
2021	NLEX	20	11.5	**.431**	.313	**.857**	1.8	.5	.2	**.2**	3.6
2022–23	NLEX	19	9.2	.256	.235	.833	1.7	.2	.5	.0	1.5
Career		141	14.8	.390	.324	.784	2.6	.7	.3	.1	4.5
