= JR Buensuceso =

Filipino-American basketball player (born 1988)

Personal information
- Born: April 21, 1988 (age 38) Glendale, California, U.S.
- Listed height: 5 ft 8 in (1.73 m)
- Listed weight: 165 lb (75 kg)

Career information
- High school: Eagle Rock (Los Angeles, California)
- College: Citrus College (2006–2008); BYU–Hawaii (2008–2010)
- PBA draft: 2012: 5th round, 48th overall pick
- Drafted by: Barangay Ginebra San Miguel
- Playing career: 2013–2015
- Position: Point guard

Career history
- 2013: GlobalPort Batang Pier
- 2014–2015: Kia Sorento / Kia Carnival

Virgil Gorospe Buensuceso (born April 21, 1988) is a Filipino-American former professional basketball player who played the point guard position. He last played for the Kia Carnival of the Philippine Basketball Association (PBA). The Barangay Ginebra San Miguel selected him 48th overall in the fifth round of the 2012 PBA draft, but the team never signed him to a contract. Buensuceso played college basketball for Citrus College and BYU–Hawaii before turning professional in 2013.

== College career ==
Buensuceso played for Citrus College from 2006 to 2008, where he earned All-Western State Conference first-team honors and averaged nine points and three rebounds per game. He then transferred to BYU–Hawaii, an NCAA Division II program, where he played from 2008 to 2010. During his time at BYU–Hawaii, Buensuceso scored 21 points in a regional tournament victory over Humboldt State in March 2009. He graduated from BYU–Hawaii in 2010 and was eligible for the 2010 NBA draft, but no team selected him.

== Professional career ==
The Barangay Ginebra San Miguel selected Buensuceso with the 48th overall pick in the fifth round of the 2012 PBA draft, but the team chose not to offer him a contract. In 2013, the GlobalPort Batang Pier signed him as a free agent after Barangay Ginebra left him unsigned. Buensuceso appeared in three games for GlobalPort during the 2012–13 PBA season and averaged 0.3 points and 0.3 rebounds per game in limited playing time. Before the start of the 2014–15 PBA season, the expansion team Kia Sorento signed him as a free agent. Buensuceso played 29 games for Kia during the 2014–15 season, averaging 4.9 points, 2.6 rebounds, and 2.2 assists per game while serving as a backup to starting point guard LA Revilla. The team released him at the end of the season after his contract expired. In October 2015, Buensuceso publicly stated that Kia management had promised him a one-year contract extension in July 2015, but the team later decided not to honor that commitment.

== PBA career statistics ==
Legend
GP	Games played	MPG	Minutes per game
FG%	Field-goal percentage	3P%	3-point field-goal percentage	FT%	Free-throw percentage
RPG	Rebounds per game	APG	Assists per game	SPG	Steals per game
BPG	Blocks per game	PPG	Points per game	**Bold**	Career high

=== Season-by-season averages ===
Year	Team	GP	MPG	FG%	3P%	FT%	RPG	APG	SPG	BPG	PPG
2012–13	GlobalPort	3	3.3	.000	.000	.333	.3	.0	.3	.0	.3
2014–15	Kia	**29**	**18.6**	**.385**	**.364**	**.780**	**2.6**	**2.2**	**1.1**	.0	**4.9**
Career		32	16.8	.378	.364	.755	2.3	2.0	1.1	.0	4.5
