= Karl Dehesa =

Filipino-American basketball player (born 1987)

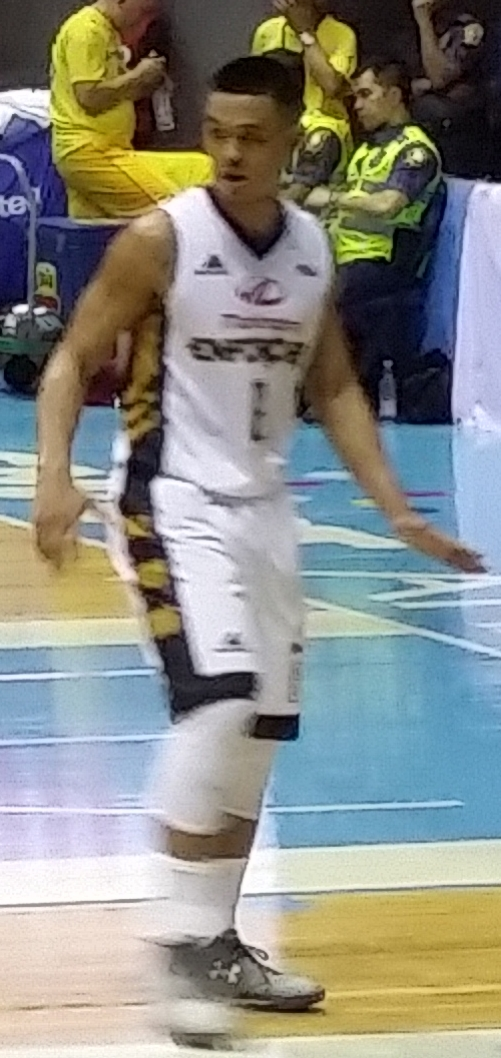
- Dehesa with the Mahindra Enforcer in 2015

Personal information
- Born: May 24, 1987 (age 39) Lakewood, California, U.S.
- Listed height: 6 ft 2 in (1.88 m)
- Listed weight: 185 lb (84 kg)

Career information
- High school: St. Anthony (Long Beach, California)
- College: Waldorf College (2008–2010)
- PBA draft: 2012: 3rd round, 22nd overall pick
- Drafted by: Alaska Aces
- Playing career: 2013–2018
- Position: Point guard / shooting guard

Career history
- 2013: Saigon Heat
- 2014–2016: Kia Sorento / Kia Carnival / Mahindra Enforcer
- 2016–2017: GlobalPort Batang Pier
- 2017–2018: Phoenix Fuel Masters

Karl Matthew Seson Dehesa is a Filipino-American former professional basketball player. He was drafted 22nd overall in the 3rd round of the 2012 PBA draft by the Alaska Aces, but was left unsigned. He has since played in the ABL, PBA, the FIBA 3x3 Men's Pro Circuit, the PBA 3x3, and has represented the Philippines in national 3x3 competitions.

== High school and college career ==
Dehesa played for St. Anthony High School, and earned the All CIF First Team Honors during his junior and senior years. For college, he attended Waldorf University in Iowa on a basketball scholarship, where he averaged 16 points per game and was awarded 1st Team All-Conference in the Midwest Collegiate Conference during his senior season.

== Professional career ==
=== 2012 PBA draft ===
Dehesa was drafted 22nd overall by the Alaska Aces in the 2012 PBA draft. However, he was not signed by the Aces.

=== Saigon Heat (ABL) ===
In January 2013, Dehesa was signed by ASEAN Basketball League (ABL) team Saigon Heat as one of the team's ASEAN Imports. However, in March 2013, just three months after he was signed, Dehesa was released by Saigon along with Phillip Morrison, another Filipino-American guard. They were both replaced by fellow Filipinos Al Vergara and Chris Sumalinog.

=== Kia Sorento / Kia Carnival / Mahindra Enforcer ===
In 2014, Dehesa was signed by the expansion team Kia Sorento as a free agent. He scored 14 points in a win over the Aces. In a loss to the Rain or Shine Elasto Painters during the 2015–16 Philippine Cup, he scored 20 points. He then had a career-high 24 points in a game Mahindra eventually lost to the Star Hotshots.

=== Globalport Batang Pier ===
In 2016, Dehesa was traded to the Globalport Batang Pier in a three-team trade. In a loss against his former team, he scored 13 points. In 2017, he became a free agent.

=== Phoenix Fuel Masters ===
The Phoenix Fuel Masters immediately signed Dehesa to their team. On August 7, 2018, he was traded to Alaska for Calvin Abueva and a 2019 first-round pick. They then dropped him to make way for MJ Ayaay.

== 3x3 career ==
In 2019, Dehesa then joined the Chooks-to-Go Pilipinas 3x3 League. His team was the Vigan Baluarte Wolves. In the 2019 Patriot's Cup, his team, the Wilkins-Balanga Pure, lost in the Finals to Phenom Basilan CTC Construction. They won the next cup, the Magiting Cup.

In 2020, Dehesa, now playing for the Butuan City Uluan Roasters, got into a heated argument with Nueva Ecija Rice Vanguard player Gab Banal after their semis loss.

In 2021, Dehesa joined the PBA 3x3 as a member of Platinum Karaoke. They won their first three games of the first conference. In 2022, for the second conference, he left the team and returned to the US.

== PBA career statistics ==
Legend
GP	Games played	MPG	Minutes per game
FG%	Field-goal percentage	3P%	3-point field-goal percentage	FT%	Free-throw percentage
RPG	Rebounds per game	APG	Assists per game	SPG	Steals per game
BPG	Blocks per game	PPG	Points per game	**Bold**	Career high

=== Season-by-season averages ===
Year	Team	GP	MPG	FG%	3P%	FT%	RPG	APG	SPG	BPG	PPG
2014–15	Kia	28	23.9	.320	.320	.857	2.9	1.4	0.6	0.1	7.8
2015–16	Mahindra / GlobalPort	29	24.0	.375	.346	.769	2.6	2.3	1.1	0.1	9.5
2016–17	GlobalPort / Phoenix	24	11.7	.325	.233	.917	0.8	0.6	0.5	0.0	3.0
2017–18	Phoenix	2	17.9	.455	.600	.500	3.5	0.5	1.5	0.0	7.5
Career		85	20.3	.345	.355	.810	2.2	1.4	0.7	0.1	6.9

== National 3x3 team career ==
In 2015, Dehesa teamed up with Calvin Abueva, Vic Manuel, and Troy Rosario for the 2015 Fiba 3x3 World Tour Manila Masters. They lost in the Manila finals to NoviSad Al-Whada, but still qualified for the World Tour finals. In the World Tour Finals, they made it to the quarterfinals, where they were eliminated in a rematch with NoviSad.

The following year, Dehesa teamed up with Mac Belo, Russel Escoto, and Glenn Khobuntin for the 2016 3x3 World Championships. They upset Romania in their first game. They ended the tournament in third place in their group with a win over Poland.

In 2019, Dehesa led his team to the semifinals in the 2019 Asia Pacific Super Quest. They made it to the Finals, where they lost to Tokyo Dime, but still qualified for the World Tour. In the 2019 Bucharest Challenger, his team only had exactly three players. In the Jeju Challenger, his team the Balanga Chooks, had no wins.

In 2021, Dehesa was an alternate for the national 3x3 team for the Olympic Qualifying Tournament. However, he failed to travel with the team to the tournament after failing to complete quarantine protocols.

== Personal life ==
Dehesa was born and raised in Long Beach, California. He grew up a fan of the Lakers played basketball at a young age with his brother.

Dehesa founded ALIGN Worldwide, a global basketball training service.
