= Geron Johnson =

American basketball player (born 1992)

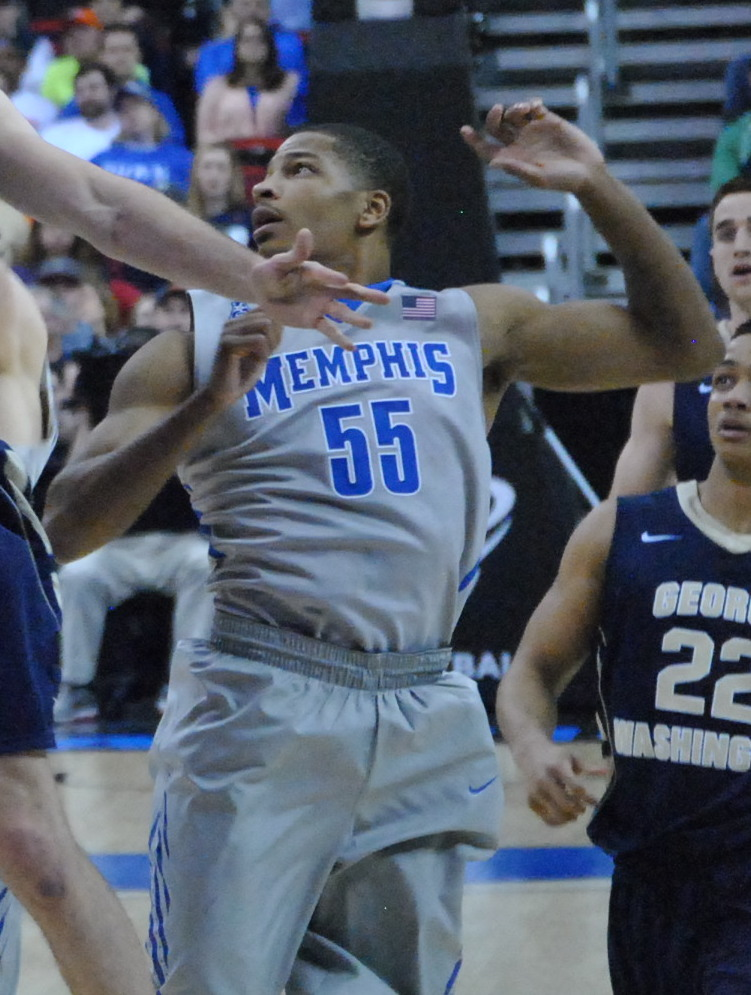
- Johnson playing for Memphis

Personal information
- Born: August 9, 1992 (age 34) Dayton, Ohio, U.S.
- Listed height: 6 ft 4 in (1.93 m)
- Listed weight: 202 lb (92 kg)

Career information
- High school: Dunbar (Dayton, Ohio)
- College: Chipola (2010–2011); Garden City CC (2011–2012); Memphis (2012–2014)
- NBA draft: 2014: undrafted
- Playing career: 2014–2019
- Position: Shooting guard

Career history
- 2014–2015: Rio Grande Valley Vipers
- 2016: Louaize Club
- 2016: Halcones de Ciudad Obregón
- 2016–2017: Louaize Club
- 2017: Kia Picanto
- 2017–2018: Sioux Falls Skyforce
- 2018: Byblos Club
- 2018: Halcones de Ciudad Obregón
- 2018–2019: Al Rayyan
- 2019: Al Mouttahed Tripoli

Career highlights
- Third-team All-Conference USA (2013)
- Stats at Basketball Reference

Geron Marquis Johnson (born August 9, 1992) is an American former professional basketball player. He played two seasons of college basketball for the University of Memphis after playing for two community colleges.

== Early life and high school career ==
Johnson's father is not in his life and his mother, Duana Hancock, raised him and his brother as a single parent. He attended Dunbar High School in Dayton, Ohio. After his sophomore season, Johnson's mother asked former NBA player Sedric Toney to mentor him. As a junior in 2008–09, he averaged 18.1 points, 4.5 rebounds, 4.1 assists and 2.9 steals per game as he earned Dayton City League Player of the Year honors. As a senior in 2009–10, he averaged 16.8 points, 4.6 assists, 4.5 rebounds and 2.5 steals per game in helping lead Dunbar to a 25–3 overall record. He subsequently earned Dayton Daily News Division 2 Player of the Year honors. A top 100 recruit in the class of 2010, Johnson led Dunbar to a state title as a senior. However, poor grades and disciplinary issues, including an attempted burglary arrest as a junior, derailed his basketball career and forced him to pay in junior college instead of immediately enrolling in an NCAA Division I school.

== College career ==
As a freshman at Chipola College in 2010–11, Johnson averaged 10.6 points, 3.6 rebounds and 3.2 assists per game, as he helped lead the Indians to a 25–6 overall record and the Panhandle Conference championship. He was dismissed from the team due to possessing marijuana.

As a sophomore at Garden City Community College in 2011–12, Johnson averaged 19.6 points and 5.6 rebounds in 25 games, as he led the Broncbusters to a 17–12 overall record. On February 22, 2012, he was expelled from the college after being arrested for theft and criminal trespassing. “After Garden City, I thought I wasn’t going to have an opportunity to bounce another basketball collegiately,” Johnson said. “That frustrated me mentally and I’m glad God has given me the opportunity to make a way and keep striving at my goals, my dreams, and my aspirations.”

On April 14, 2012, Johnson signed a National Letter of Intent to play college basketball for the University of Memphis. Coach Josh Pastner recruited Johnson as a replacement for Will Barton after it became clear that Barton would leave early for the professional ranks. Johnson was considered to be one of the best junior college players in the nation but a risky recruit due to his criminal record. As a result, Pastner set a unique midnight curfew and routine academic monitoring.

Coming into his junior season, Johnson was suspended for three games by the NCAA for receiving impermissible benefits. As a junior at Memphis in 2012–13, Johnson saw action in 33 games and made 26 starts while averaging 10.4 points, 4.6 rebounds and 3.5 assists per game. He subsequently earned third-team All-Conference USA and NABC Division I All-District 11 second team honors. He had a career-high 21 points in an 84–58 victory over Ohio. In the team's season-ending loss to Michigan State in the third round of the NCAA Tournament, Johnson had a team-high 16 points. Off the court, Johnson volunteered in the community by reading to small children and was honored for his academic achievement. He was one of the 19 players invited to the Kevin Durant Skills Academy over the summer after his junior year.

As a senior in 2013–14, Johnson started 33 of 34 games and averaged 8.9 points, 4.9 rebounds, 3.5 assists and 1.3 steals per game. In doing so, he helped Memphis to a 24–10 overall record and a 12–6 conference mark in the program's first season in the American Athletic Conference in 2013–14. In May 2014, he graduated with a bachelor's degree in interdisciplinary studies.

== Professional career ==
After going undrafted in the 2014 NBA draft, Johnson joined the Houston Rockets for the 2014 NBA Summer League. On October 23, 2014, he signed with the Rockets, only to be waived two days later prior to the start of the 2014–15 NBA season. On November 2, 2014, he was acquired by the Rio Grande Valley Vipers of the NBA Development League as an affiliate player. In 33 games for the Vipers in 2014–15, he averaged 5.2 points, 2.2 rebounds and 1.4 assists per game.

In July 2015, Johnson joined the Los Angeles Clippers for the 2015 NBA Summer League.

On May 26, 2018, Johnson signed with Halcones de Ciudad Obregón of the Mexican CIBACOPA. He averaged 15.8 points, 5.8 rebounds and 5.7 assists per game in 25 games as Halcones made it to the CIBACOPA final.

Johnson signed with Al Rayyan SC of the Qatari Basketball League on December 15, 2018. On August 9, 2019, he signed with Al Mouttahed Tripoli of the Lebanese Basketball League.
