= Reden Celda =

Filipino basketball player

Personal information
- Born: March 1, 1992 (age 34) Davao City, Philippines
- Listed height: 6 ft 0 in (1.83 m)
- Listed weight: 165 lb (75 kg)

Career information
- College: NU
- PBA draft: 2016: 2nd round, 8th overall pick
- Drafted by: NLEX Road Warriors
- Playing career: 2016–2023
- Position: Point guard / shooting guard

Career history
- 2016–2022: Mahindra Floodbuster / Kia Picanto / Columbian Dyip / Terrafirma Dyip
- 2022: Zamboanga Family's Brand Sardines
- 2022–2023: NLEX Road Warriors

Career highlights
- PBA All-Rookie Team (2017); UAAP champion (2014)

Reden Marimon Celda is a Filipino former professional basketball player. He played college basketball at the National University. He was drafted by the NLEX Road Warriors at the 2014 PBA draft.

== Professional career ==
Celda was drafted eight overall by the NLEX Road Warriors in the 2016 PBA draft. Nine days after the draft, on November 8, he, along with Rob Reyes and Jeckster Apinan, was traded to the Mahindra Floodbuster for Bradwyn Guinto and Chito Jaime. He became a free agent after the 2021 season.

In October 2022, Celda signed a one-conference contract with the NLEX Road Warriors, the team that originally drafted him. Prior to him signing with NLEX, Celda played with the Zamboanga Family's Brand Sardines of the Maharlika Pilipinas Basketball League (MPBL).

On May 30, 2023, Celda, along with Tzaddy Rangel, was traded to the Phoenix Super LPG Fuel Masters for Ben Adamos. However, he never played a game for the team.

== PBA career statistics ==
Legend
GP	Games played	MPG	Minutes per game
FG%	Field-goal percentage	3P%	3-point field-goal percentage	FT%	Free-throw percentage
RPG	Rebounds per game	APG	Assists per game	SPG	Steals per game
BPG	Blocks per game	PPG	Points per game	**Bold**	Career high

As of the end of 2022–23 season

=== Season-by-season averages ===
Year	Team	GP	MPG	FG%	3P%	FT%	RPG	APG	SPG	BPG	PPG
2016–17	Mahindra / Kia	**33**	**19.7**	**.444**	**.333**	.784	**2.2**	1.3	**1.0**	**.1**	**9.4**
2017–18	Kia / Columbian	30	18.2	.393	.286	.800	1.4	**2.3**	.8	**.1**	7.1
2019	Columbian	28	15.8	.333	.284	.674	2.0	2.0	.8	**.1**	5.2
2020	Terrafirma	10	12.6	.360	.292	.700	2.0	.4	.3	.0	5.7
2021	Terrafirma	12	12.7	.327	.286	.850	1.8	1.8	.5	**.1**	4.8
2022–23	NLEX	7	10.5	.227	.077	**1.000**	.9	1.3	.1	.0	1.7
Career		120	16.6	.387	.200	.762	1.8	1.7	.7	.1	6.6
