= Hyram Bagatsing =

Filipino-American basketball player

Personal information
- Born: February 18, 1985 (age 41) San Francisco, California, U.S.
- Listed height: 6 ft 1 in (1.85 m)
- Listed weight: 190 lb (86 kg)

Career information
- College: De La Salle
- PBA draft: 2010: Undrafted
- Playing career: 2011–2016, 2021
- Position: Shooting guard

Career history

Playing
- 2011–2012: Shopinas.com Clickers
- 2014–2016: Kia Sorento / Kia Carnival / Mahindra Enforcer
- 2021: Muntinlupa Cagers

Coaching
- 2026–present: De La Salle Zobel

Hyram Berenkotter Bagatsing (born February 18, 1985) is a Filipino former professional basketball player. Bagatsing is the grandson of former Manila Mayor Ramon Bagatsing.

Bagatsing current coaches the 16U team of the Zobel Junior Archers.

== Playing career ==
=== College career ===
Bagatsing played college ball at the De La Salle University and suited up for the De La Salle Green Archers in the UAAP. He was part of the 2008 PCCL championship squad.

=== Professional career ===
Bagatsing declared himself eligible for the 2010 PBA draft, however, he was not picked by any team. He was then signed by Shopinas.com Clickers in 2011 as a free agent, reuniting with college coach Franz Pumaren.

== Coaching career ==
Bagatsing debuted as the coach of the De La Salle Santiago Zobel School's 16U basketball team in UAAP Season 89.

== Outside basketball ==
After his playing career, Bagatsing became the vice president for development of Channel Technologies, Incorporated.

== PBA career statistics ==
Legend
GP	Games played	MPG	Minutes per game
FG%	Field-goal percentage	3P%	3-point field-goal percentage	FT%	Free-throw percentage
RPG	Rebounds per game	APG	Assists per game	SPG	Steals per game
BPG	Blocks per game	PPG	Points per game	**Bold**	Career high

=== Season-by-season averages ===
Year	Team	GP	MPG	FG%	3P%	FT%	RPG	APG	SPG	BPG	PPG
2011–12	Shopinas	7	7.9	.167	.125	**1.000**	.4	.9	.0	.0	1.0
2014–15	Kia	17	**17.1**	**.396**	**.365**	.500	**2.2**	**1.9**	**.4**	.0	**6.6**
2015–16	Mahindra	**27**	11.2	.329	.286	.571	1.2	1.2	**.4**	.0	2.7
Career		51	12.7	.354	.317	.556	1.4	1.4	.3	.0	3.8
