= Augustus Gilchrist =

American basketball player

Personal information
- Born: October 15, 1989 (age 37) Clinton, Maryland, U.S.
- Listed height: 6 ft 10 in (2.08 m)
- Listed weight: 240 lb (109 kg)

Career information
- High school: Progressive Christian (Temple Hills, Maryland)
- College: South Florida (2008–2012)
- NBA draft: 2012: undrafted
- Playing career: 2012–2018
- Position: Center / power forward

Career history
- 2012–2014: Iowa Energy
- 2014–2015: Granarolo Bologna
- 2015: Alba Fehervar
- 2016: Mahindra Enforcer
- 2018: Hi-Tech Bangkok City

Augustus Gilchrist (born 15 October 1989) is an American former professional basketball player. He played collegiate basketball for the University of South Florida Bulls from 2008 to 2012, with per-game averages of 11.4 points and 5.3 rebounds. In the Big East Media Day in 2011, Gilchrist was selected as a 2011–12 Preseason All-Big East Honorable Mention.

== Professional career ==
=== Iowa Energy ===
After his college career, Gilchrist joined Iowa Energy of the NBA D-League in 2012 after being undrafted in the 2012 NBA draft. His two-year stint with the team had him averaging 6.9 points and 4.3 rebounds in 16 minutes a game for 69 games.

=== Granarolo Bologna ===
Gilchrist spent the first part of the 2014–2015 season with Granarolo Bologna and then later for Alba Fehervar. In 19 total games, he averaged 6.1 points and 4.8 rebounds in 17.5 minutes.

=== Alba Fehervar ===
Gilchrist signed with Alba Fehervar of the Hungarian League. However, he only played five games for the club, averaging 8.6 points per game and 5.2 rebounds per game in 14.8 minutes per game.

=== Mahindra Enforcer ===
In January 2016, Gilchrist signed with the Mahindra Enforcer as the team's import for the 2016 PBA Commissioner's Cup.
