= Michael Burtscher =

Filipino-Swiss basketball player

Personal information
- Born: March 8, 1985 (age 41) Baden, Switzerland
- Listed height: 6 ft 6 in (1.98 m)
- Listed weight: 224 lb (102 kg)

Career information
- College: Clearwater Christian College
- PBA draft: 2009: 1st round, 5th overall pick
- Drafted by: Alaska Aces
- Playing career: 2009–2015
- Position: Power forward / center

Career history
- 2009–2011: Alaska Aces
- 2012: B-Meg Llamados
- 2012–2013: San Miguel Beermen
- 2013–2014: Air21 Express
- 2014–2015: Kia Sorento / Kia Carnival

Career highlights
- 2× PBA champion (2010 Fiesta, 2012 Commissioner's); ABL champion (2013)

Michael Burtscher (born March 8, 1985) is a Filipino-Swiss former professional basketball player in the Philippine Basketball Association (PBA).

Initially one of the 51 rookie aspirants in the 2009 PBA draft, Burtscher was selected as the sixth overall pick by the Alaska Aces. Burtscher won his first ring as a rookie when he played for the Aces for two seasons before being traded to the then B-Meg Llamados and winning his second PBA championship. Shortly after winning his first title, Burtscher was waived by the Llamados. He was later signed to the San Miguel Beermen of the ASEAN Basketball League where he also won a championship. The entry of two new expansions teams in the PBA signaled his return to the second oldest league in the world, he was signed by the then Kia Sorento where he played for a season averaging 3 points per game.

Burtscher hinted his retirement on September 10, 2016, on his Facebook account citing that his 'heart isn't on the game anymore'. Four days later, he finally made an official announcement thanking all the people who contributed to his 'good career'. Burtscher currently enjoys being an indigenous people advocate, photographer and philanthropist.

== PBA career statistics ==
Legend
GP	Games played	MPG	Minutes per game
FG%	Field-goal percentage	3P%	3-point field-goal percentage	FT%	Free-throw percentage
RPG	Rebounds per game	APG	Assists per game	SPG	Steals per game
BPG	Blocks per game	PPG	Points per game	**Bold**	Career high

=== Season-by-season averages ===
Year	Team	GP	MPG	FG%	3P%	FT%	RPG	APG	SPG	BPG	PPG
2009–10	Alaska	13	5.8	.312	.000	.167	1.2	.1	**.1**	.2	.9
2011–12	B-Meg	12	1.9	.125	.000	.000	.6	.0	.0	.3	.2
2012–13	Air21	2	5.0	.000	.000	.000	1.0	.0	.0	.0	.0
2013–14	Air21	**31**	7.6	.419	.000	**.667**	1.4	**.2**	.0	.3	1.2
2014–15	Kia	11	**10.8**	**.478**	.000	.500	**1.7**	**.2**	**.1**	**.6**	**2.5**
Career		69	6.7	.385	.000	.516	1.2	.1	.0	.3	1.1
