= LA Revilla =

Filipino basketball player

UE Red Warriors
- Position: Assistant coach

Personal information
- Born: November 30, 1989 (age 36) Bacolod, Philippines
- Listed height: 5 ft 7 in (1.70 m)
- Listed weight: 165 lb (75 kg)

Career information
- High school: San Beda (Manila)
- College: De La Salle
- PBA draft: 2013: 3rd round, 24th overall pick
- Drafted by: Barangay Ginebra San Miguel
- Playing career: 2013–2020
- Coaching career: 2024–present

Career history

Playing
- 2013–2014: GlobalPort Batang Pier
- 2014–2017: Kia Sorento / Kia Carnival / Mahindra Enforcer / Mahindra Floodbuster / Kia Picanto
- 2017–2019: Phoenix Pulse Fuel Masters
- 2020: NorthPort Batang Pier

Coaching
- 2024–present: UE Red Warriors (assistant)

Career highlights
- PBA All-Star (2017); UAAP champion (2013); UAAP All-Rookie Team (2008)

Luis Alfonso Revilla (born November 30, 1989) is a Filipino former professional basketball player who played in the Philippine Basketball Association (PBA) and currently an assistant head coach for the UE Red Warriors.

== College career ==
Revilla, a San Beda Red Cub stalwart, was recruited by DLSU and suited up for the Green Archers in 2008. In his rookie season, he averaged 3.5 points, 1.7 rebounds, 1.9 assists, and 0.7 steals on 14.3 minutes per game, and was just a backup guard then to JVee Casio and Simon Atkins. His team lost to the Ateneo Blue Eagles in the UAAP Season 71 Finals. By the end of that season he was named a member of the league's All-Rookie team.

In summer of 2009, a few months before the opening of the UAAP's 72nd Season, he was diagnosed to have type 2 diabetes, a condition, which he said, runs in their family. This has prevented him from suiting up for La Salle for two seasons.

After two years, he returned to active competition in Season 74. He finished the season with averages of 7.7 points, 3.7 assists and a league-leading 1.8 steals per game.

The next year, he Season 75, scored 19 points in a double overtime loss to UST Growling Tigers in the first round, but things would then take a turn for the worse. Against the NU Bulldogs in the first round finale, he would tweak his ankle in a double overtime victory after masterfully orchestrating the offense for the Green Archers down the stretch. He would still finish the eliminations with averages of 8.7 points, 4.6 rebounds and three assists, but he was only able to suit up for nine out of the 14 regular season games as rookie Thomas Torres stepped into his role as the primary point guard.

He would continue his role in Season 76 as an off-the-bench player, serving as a backup to Torres for most of the first round; however, after La Salle almost fell out of the standings with 3–4 win–loss record and with Torres sidelined with an injury, he would regain his starting spot and helped the team sweep the second round, and eventually win their UAAP Championship since 2007.

He elected to forgo his final playing year after he applied for the PBA draft.

== Professional career ==
Revilla was picked 24th overall in the third round by GlobalPort Batang Pier in the 2013 PBA draft. He joined GlobalPort's fully loaded backcourt of Sol Mercado and fellow draftees RR Garcia and Terrence Romeo, his former rivals from FEU. He would also be reunited with former Ateneo Blue Eagle and high school teammate Nico Salva.

He played a total of just three games with the Batang Pier, averaging 0.7 points, 1.3 rebounds and 0.7 assist in 7.6 minutes during the Philippine Cup. He was released by the team after playing just one conference. He then played for the Cagayan Rising Suns in the PBA D-League, in the hope of earning another call-up to the pro league.

He then joined the tryouts for expansion team Kia Sorento, and won a spot in the team for the upcoming 2014–15 PBA season. He also signed a one-year contract with the team.

In his first game in a Sorento uniform, he posted his career-high 23 points as he led the Sorentos' rally in the third quarter to beat Blackwater Elite in their season debut at the Philippine Arena.

== PBA career statistics ==
Legend
GP	Games played	MPG	Minutes per game
FG%	Field-goal percentage	3P%	3-point field-goal percentage	FT%	Free-throw percentage
RPG	Rebounds per game	APG	Assists per game	SPG	Steals per game
BPG	Blocks per game	PPG	Points per game	**Bold**	Career high

As of the end of 2020 season

=== Season-by-season averages ===
Year	Team	GP	MPG	FG%	3P%	FT%	RPG	APG	SPG	BPG	PPG
2013–14	GlobalPort	3	7.7	.167	.000	—	1.3	.7	.0	.0	.7
2014–15	Kia	**32**	27.8	.405	.241	.776	**4.3**	**4.2**	**1.5**	.0	9.6
2015–16	Mahindra	31	**28.4**	.408	.275	.741	3.7	4.1	1.4	.0	**10.6**
2016–17	Mahindra / Kia	30	22.8	**.415**	**.33**3	**.778**	3.1	3.7	.9	.0	6.9
2017–18	Phoenix	**32**	21.4	.364	.259	.548	3.1	3.9	**1.5**	.0	4.2
2019	Phoenix Pulse	22	17.7	.388	.278	.650	2.7	2.5	.8	.0	4.5
2020	NorthPort	11	13.1	.333	.235	.000	1.9	1.4	.4	.0	2.2
Career		161	23.0	.397	.268	.721	3.3	3.5	1.2	.0	6.8

== Personal life ==
Revilla is married to volleyball player Denden Lazaro.
