= 2016–17 PBA season =

42nd PBA season

- Duration: November 20, 2016 – October 27, 2017
- Teams: 12
- TV partner(s): Local: Sports5/ESPN5; TV5; PBA Rush (HD); International: AksyonTV International

2016 PBA draft
- Top draft pick: Carl Bryan Cruz
- Picked by: Alaska Aces
- Season MVP: June Mar Fajardo (San Miguel Beermen)
- Top scorer: Terrence Romeo (GlobalPort Batang Pier)
- Philippine Cup champions: San Miguel Beermen
- Philippine Cup runners-up: Barangay Ginebra San Miguel
- Commissioner's Cup champions: San Miguel Beermen
- Commissioner's Cup runners-up: TNT KaTropa
- Governors' Cup champions: Barangay Ginebra San Miguel
- Governors' Cup runners-up: Meralco Bolts

Seasons
- ← 2015–16 2017–18 →

The 2016–17 PBA season was the 42nd season of the Philippine Basketball Association (PBA). The league continues to use the three-conference format, starting with the Philippine Cup. The Commissioner's Cup and the Governors' Cup are the second and third conferences in the upcoming season.

The first event of the season was the 2016 PBA draft, held on October 30.

== Executive board ==
- Andres Narvasa, Jr. (commissioner)
- Michael Romero (Chairman, representing GlobalPort Batang Pier)
- Ramoncito Fernandez (vice chairman, representing NLEX Road Warriors)
- Richard Bachmann (treasurer, representing Alaska Aces)

== Teams ==
Team	Company	Governor	Coach	Captain
Alaska Aces	Alaska Milk Corporation	Richard Bachmann	Alex Compton	Sonny Thoss
Barangay Ginebra San Miguel	Ginebra San Miguel, Inc.	Alfrancis Chua	Tim Cone	Mark Caguioa
Blackwater Elite	Ever Bilena Cosmetics, Inc.	Silliman Sy	Leo Isaac	Reil Cervantes
GlobalPort Batang Pier	Sultan 900 Capital, Inc.	Eric Arejola	Franz Pumaren	Billy Mamaril
Mahindra Floodbuster	Columbian Autocar Corporation	Tomas Alvarez	Manny Pacquiao (Chris Gavina, interim)	LA Revilla
Meralco Bolts	Manila Electric Company	Al Panlilio	Norman Black	Chris Newsome
NLEX Road Warriors	Metro Pacific Investments Corporation	Ramoncito Fernandez	Yeng Guiao	Asi Taulava
Phoenix Fuel Masters	Phoenix Petroleum Philippines, Inc.	Dennis Uy	Ariel Vanguardia	Willy Wilson
Rain or Shine Elasto Painters	Asian Coatings Philippines, Inc.	Mamerto Mondragon	Caloy Garcia	Gabe Norwood
San Miguel Beermen	San Miguel Brewery, Inc.	Robert Non	Leo Austria	Arwind Santos
Star Hotshots	San Miguel Pure Foods Company, Inc.	Rene Pardo	Chito Victolero	Rafi Reavis
TNT KaTropa	Smart Communications	Victorico Vargas	Nash Racela	Ranidel de Ocampo

=== Coaching changes ===
Team	Outgoing coach	Manner of departure	Date of vacancy	Position in standings	Replaced with	Date of appointment
GlobalPort Batang Pier	Johnedel Cardel	Demoted to assistant coach	Preseason	—N/a	Franz Pumaren	November 25, 2016

== Arenas ==
Like several Metro Manila-centric leagues, most games are held at arenas within Metro Manila, either the Smart Araneta Coliseum or the Mall of Asia Arena, and sometimes, in the Ynares Center in Antipolo. Games outside this area are called "out-of-town" games, and are usually played on Saturdays. Provincial arenas usually host one game, rarely two; these arenas typically host only once per season, but a league may return within a season if the turnout is satisfactory.

Typically, all playoff games are held in Metro Manila arenas, although playoff and finals games have been seldom played in the provinces.

=== Main arenas ===
Main arenas of the PBA in Metro Manila and Rizal

Arena	City
Cuneta Astrodome	Pasay
Filoil Flying V Centre	San Juan
Mall of Asia Arena	Pasay
PhilSports Arena	Pasig
Smart Araneta Coliseum	Quezon City
Ynares Center	Antipolo

=== Out-of-town arenas ===
Provincial venues of the PBA that hosted one game day (red), and two or more game days (blue).

Highlighted are playoff games.

Arena	City	Date	Match-up
Xavier University Gym	Cagayan de Oro	December 17, 2016	San Miguel vs. NLEX
Philippine Arena	Bocaue, Bulacan	December 25, 2016	Mahindra vs. Blackwater; Barangay Ginebra vs. Star
Philippine Arena	Bocaue, Bulacan	October 22, 2017	Barangay Ginebra vs. Meralco
Philippine Arena	Bocaue, Bulacan	October 25, 2017	Barangay Ginebra vs. Meralco
Philippine Arena	Bocaue, Bulacan	October 27, 2017	Barangay Ginebra vs. Meralco
Angeles University Foundation Sports Arena	Angeles City	January 7, 2017	NLEX vs. TNT
Angeles University Foundation Sports Arena	Angeles City	September 2, 2017	San Miguel vs. Alaska
University of San Agustin Gym	Iloilo City	January 14, 2017	Barangay Ginebra vs. Meralco
Hoops Dome	Lapu-Lapu City	January 21, 2017	GlobalPort vs. San Miguel
Hoops Dome	Lapu-Lapu City	August 26, 2017	Barangay Ginebra vs. Alaska
Quezon Convention Center	Lucena	February 26, 2017	Barangay Ginebra vs. San Miguel
Quezon Convention Center	Lucena	October 13, 2017	Barangay Ginebra vs. Meralco
Mindanao Civic Center Gymnasium	Tubod, Lanao del Norte	March 25, 2017	Star vs. GlobalPort
University of Southeastern Philippines Gym	Davao City	April 1, 2017	Barangay Ginebra vs. Phoenix
Batangas City Sports Center	Batangas City	May 6, 2017	Rain or Shine vs. Star
Batangas City Sports Center	Batangas City	October 4, 2017	TNT vs. Barangay Ginebra
Ibalong Centrum for Recreation	Legazpi, Albay	May 20, 2017	TNT vs. Alaska
Alonte Sports Arena	Biñan	May 26, 2017	Rain or Shine vs. GlobalPort; Barangay Ginebra vs. Blackwater
Alonte Sports Arena	Biñan	October 1, 2017	Star vs. Meralco
Calasiao Sports Complex	Calasiao, Pangasinan	August 5, 2017	Barangay Ginebra vs. NLEX
Santa Rosa Sports Complex	Santa Rosa, Laguna	September 9, 2017	Star vs. Meralco
Santa Rosa Sports Complex	Santa Rosa, Laguna	October 3, 2017	Star vs. Meralco

== Transactions ==
=== Retirement ===
- September 10, 2016: Michael Burtscher announced his retirement after playing 5 seasons in the PBA.
- November 3, 2016: Jimmy Alapag announced his retirement after playing 13 seasons in the PBA.
- November 18, 2016: Yousef Taha announced that he had left the country back to his hometown Kuwait, thereby ending his PBA career. Taha, though not officially retiring, said that he left for personal reasons and "he felt that it is best for him to not continue his PBA career". Taha played for five different teams in his 4 seasons in the league. However, he returned to the country to play again a year later.
- November 19, 2016: Nelbert Omolon announced his retirement after playing 12 seasons in the PBA to focus on his agribusiness career.
- November 27, 2016: Eddie Laure announced his retirement after playing 12 seasons in the PBA to focus on new role as coach for UST.
- December 15, 2016: Rob Reyes announced his retirement after playing 8 seasons in the PBA.
- May 7, 2017: Eric Menk announced his retirement after playing 16 seasons in the PBA.
- September 2, 2017: Mick Pennisi announced his retirement after playing 17 seasons in the PBA.

=== Coaching changes ===
==== Offseason ====
- October 7, 2016: Yeng Guiao resigned as coach of the Rain or Shine Elasto Painters. Assistant coach Caloy Garcia takes over as head coach of the Elasto Painters. Guiao was then signed as the head coach of the NLEX Road Warriors replacing Boyet Fernandez, who will still be with NLEX on a different capacity.
- October 14, 2016: Star Hotshots head coach Jason Webb was appointed as team consultant. Chito Victolero will take over as the Hotshots' head coach.
- October 22, 2016: TNT KaTropa appointed Nash Racela to be its head coach replacing Jong Uichico.

==== Philippine Cup ====
- November 25, 2016: GlobalPort Batang Pier formally appointed team consultant Franz Pumaren to be its head coach replacing Johnedel Cardel, who was then relegated as an assistant coach.

== Notable events ==
=== Pre-season ===
- The Mahindra Enforcer silently changed their name to Mahindra Floodbuster. The team's new logo debuted during the league's annual draft.
- November 14 – The PBA officially launched its own smartphone application named "PBA: The App" which is currently available on Google Play and Apple App Store. The app featured news articles, scores, schedules, stats of the games and profiles of the teams and players.

=== Philippine Cup ===
- December 25 – The league held its Christmas games at the Philippine Arena, featuring games between Blackwater Elite vs Mahindra Floodbuster and Barangay Ginebra San Miguel vs Star Hotshots. This is the second time the league held its games at the venue.
- The San Miguel Beermen won their third straight Philippine Cup championship against Barangay Ginebra San Miguel, four games to one. The Beermen also became the second PBA franchise to keep permanent possession of the Jun Bernardino Trophy.

=== Commissioner's Cup ===
- The league took two week-long breaks during the Commissioner's Cup: first during the All-Star Week (April 26 to 30) and second during the Philippines' hosting of the SEABA Championship (May 12 to 18).
- A different All-Star Week format was adopted for this season. Three PBA All-Star teams, one each with players representing Luzon, Visayas and Mindanao pitted against Gilas Pilipinas, the men's national basketball team. Gilas Pilipinas players played for the PBA All-Star team if they hail to the game's host region.
- PBA Chairman Mikee Romero was issued with a warrant of arrest by the Manila Regional Trial Court over allegations that he stole P3.4 million from his family's company Harbour Centre Port Terminal Inc. While Romero will remain as the PBA Chairman, Ramoncito Fernandez of the NLEX Road Warriors will be the acting chairman of the board of governors during Romero's absence.
- April 28 – After the Luzon leg of the All-Star Week, Gilas Pilipinas coach Chot Reyes announced the 12 man lineup that will compete for the SEABA Championship. Subsequently, the All-Star Game team lineups for the Visayas leg scheduled on April 30 were altered. June Mar Fajardo and Terrence Romeo, originally supposed to play for the PBA Visayas All-Stars were transferred to the Gilas Pilipinas team. LA Tenorio and Rabeh Al-Hussaini replaced them in the PBA Visayas All-Stars lineup.
- May 28 – Barangay Ginebra San Miguel wore their throwback 1991 Ginebra San Miguel jerseys in honor of the team who won the 1991 First Conference championship coming from a 1–3 deficit.
- June 14 – Barangay Ginebra San Miguel wore their throwback 1996 Ginebra San Miguel jerseys.

=== Governors' Cup ===
- The Mahindra Floodbuster changed their name to Kia Picanto. The team's new logo and uniforms debuted at the opening day of the Governors' Cup on July 19.
- August 26 – Barangay Ginebra San Miguel wore their throwback 2001 Barangay Ginebra Kings jerseys in honor of the team who won PBA championships from 2004 to 2008.
- October 22 – Game 5 of the Governors' Cup finals between Barangay Ginebra and Meralco held at the Philippine Arena set the all-time PBA finals attendance record of 36,445, breaking the previous record of 23,436 fans during Game 3 of the 2013 Commissioner's Cup between Alaska and Barangay Ginebra.
- October 25 – 53,642 fans attended game 6 of the Governors' Cup finals at the Philippine Arena. This record broke the finals attendance record as well as the all-time overall attendance record of 52,612, set during the opening of 2014–15 season on October 19, 2014.
- October 27 – Game 7 of the Governors' Cup finals broke the records set on October 22 and 25 as 54,086 fans watched the series clinching game between Barangay Ginebra and Meralco.

== Opening ceremonies ==
The opening ceremonies for this season was held at the Smart Araneta Coliseum in Quezon City on November 20, 2016. The first game of the Philippine Cup between the Star Hotshots and the San Miguel Beermen immediately followed.

The muses for the participating teams are as follows:

Team	Muse
Alaska Aces	Ciara Bachmann
Barangay Ginebra San Miguel	Kim Domingo
Blackwater Elite	Daiana Menezes and Janelle Olafson
GlobalPort Batang Pier	Valeen Montenegro
Mahindra Floodbuster	Sophie Rankin
Meralco Bolts	Maxine Medina
NLEX Road Warriors	Margo Midwinter
Phoenix Fuel Masters	Sofia Andres and Elisse Joson
Rain or Shine Elasto Painters	Justine Mae San Jose
San Miguel Beermen	Yassi Pressman
Star Hotshots	Kylie Verzosa
TNT KaTropa	Angelica Alita

== 2016–17 Philippine Cup ==
=== Elimination round ===
Pos	Team	W	L	PCT	GB	Qualification
1	San Miguel Beermen	10	1	.909	—	Twice-to-beat in the quarterfinals
2	Alaska Aces	7	4	.636 (Note: Head-to-head record: Alaska 1–0 Star)	3	Twice-to-beat in the quarterfinals
3	Star Hotshots	7	4	.636	3	Best-of-three quarterfinals
4	TNT KaTropa	6	5	.545 (Note: Head-to-head quotient: TNT 1.09, GlobalPort 1.00, Phoenix 0.96, Barangay Ginebra 0.94.)	4	Best-of-three quarterfinals
5	GlobalPort Batang Pier	6	5	.545	4	Best-of-three quarterfinals
6	Phoenix Fuel Masters	6	5	.545	4	Best-of-three quarterfinals
7	Barangay Ginebra San Miguel	6	5	.545	4	Twice-to-win in the quarterfinals
8	Rain or Shine Elasto Painters	5	6	.455 (Note: Eighth seed playoff: Rain or Shine 103–80 Blackwater)	5	Twice-to-win in the quarterfinals
9	Blackwater Elite	5	6	.455	5	
10	Mahindra Floodbuster	3	8	.273 (Note: Head-to-head record: Mahindra 1–0 Meralco)	7	
11	Meralco Bolts	3	8	.273	7	
12	NLEX Road Warriors	2	9	.182	8	

Source: PBA.ph

=== Playoffs ===
Quarterfinals
(#1 twice-to-beat)
1	San Miguel	98
8	Rain or Shine	91
(Best-of-3)
4	TNT	2
5	GlobalPort	0
(#2 twice-to-beat)
2	Alaska	81	97
7	Barangay Ginebra	85	108
(Best-of-3)
3	Star	2
6	Phoenix	0

Semifinals (Best-of-7)
1	San Miguel	4
4	TNT	3
7	Barangay Ginebra	4
3	Star	3

Finals (Best-of-7)
1	San Miguel	4
7	Barangay Ginebra	1

==== Quarterfinals ====
Team 1	Series	Team 2	Game 1	Game 2
(1) San Miguel Beermen*	1–0	(8) Rain or Shine Elasto Painters	98–91	—
(2) Alaska Aces*	0–2	(7) Barangay Ginebra San Miguel	81–85	97–108

Team 1	Series	Team 2	Game 1	Game 2	Game 3
(3) Star Hotshots	2–0	(6) Phoenix Fuel Masters	114–83	91–71	—
(4) TNT KaTropa	2–0	(5) GlobalPort Batang Pier	109–101	95–90	—

*Team has twice-to-beat advantage. Team #1 only has to win once, while Team #2 has to win twice.

==== Semifinals ====
Team 1	Series	Team 2	Game 1	Game 2	Game 3	Game 4	Game 5	Game 6	Game 7
(1) San Miguel Beermen	4–3	(4) TNT KaTropa	111–98	85–87	92–98	97–86	94–101	104–88	96–83
(3) Star Hotshots	3–4	(7) Barangay Ginebra San Miguel	78–74	91–89	62–73	86–93	89–80	67–91	76–89

==== Finals ====
Team 1	Series	Team 2	Game 1	Game 2	Game 3	Game 4	Game 5	Game 6	Game 7
(1) San Miguel Beermen	4–1	(7) Barangay Ginebra San Miguel	109–82	118–124 (OT)	99–88	94–85	91–85	—	—

- Finals MVP: Chris Ross (San Miguel Beermen)
- Best Player of the Conference: June Mar Fajardo (San Miguel Beermen)

== 2017 Commissioner's Cup ==
=== Elimination round ===
Pos	Team	W	L	PCT	GB	Qualification
1	Barangay Ginebra San Miguel	9	2	.818 (Note: Head-to-head quotient: Barangay Ginebra 1.117, San Miguel 0.990, Star 0.903)	—	Twice-to-beat in the quarterfinals
2	San Miguel Beermen	9	2	.818	—	Twice-to-beat in the quarterfinals
3	Star Hotshots	9	2	.818	—	Best-of-three quarterfinals
4	TNT KaTropa	8	3	.727	1	Best-of-three quarterfinals
5	Meralco Bolts	7	4	.636	2	Best-of-three quarterfinals
6	Rain or Shine Elasto Painters	5	6	.455	4	Best-of-three quarterfinals
7	Phoenix Fuel Masters	4	7	.364 (Note: Head-to-head quotient: Phoenix 1.127, Alaska 1.116, GlobalPort 0.791; eighth seed playoff: GlobalPort 107–106 Alaska)	5	Twice-to-win in the quarterfinals
8	GlobalPort Batang Pier	4	7	.364	5	Twice-to-win in the quarterfinals
9	Alaska Aces	4	7	.364	5	
10	Mahindra Floodbuster	3	8	.273	6	
11	Blackwater Elite	2	9	.182 (Note: Head-to-head record: Blackwater 1–0 NLEX)	7	
12	NLEX Road Warriors	2	9	.182	7	

Source: PBA.ph

=== Playoffs ===
Quarterfinals
(#1 twice-to-beat)
1	Barangay Ginebra	96
8	GlobalPort	85
(Best-of-3)
4	TNT	2
5	Meralco	1
(#2 twice-to-beat)
2	San Miguel	115
7	Phoenix	96
(Best-of-3)
3	Star	2
6	Rain or Shine	0

Semifinals (Best-of-5)
1	Barangay Ginebra	1
4	TNT	3
2	San Miguel	3
3	Star	1

Finals (Best-of-7)
4	TNT	2
2	San Miguel	4

==== Quarterfinals ====
Team 1	Series	Team 2	Game 1	Game 2
(1) Barangay Ginebra San Miguel*	1–0	(8) GlobalPort Batang Pier	96–85	—
(2) San Miguel Beermen*	1–0	(7) Phoenix Fuel Masters	115–96	—

Team 1	Series	Team 2	Game 1	Game 2	Game 3
(3) Star Hotshots	2–0	(6) Rain or Shine Elasto Painters	118–82	84–69	—
(4) TNT KaTropa	2–1	(5) Meralco Bolts	102–84	100–103 (OT)	104–96 (OT)

*Team has twice-to-beat advantage. Team #1 only has to win once, while Team #2 has to win twice.

==== Semifinals ====
Team 1	Series	Team 2	Game 1	Game 2	Game 3	Game 4	Game 5
(1) Barangay Ginebra San Miguel	1–3	(4) TNT KaTropa	94–100	103–107	125–101	109–122	—
(2) San Miguel Beermen	3–1	(3) Star Hotshots	105–109	77–76	111–110	109–102	—

==== Finals ====
Team 1	Series	Team 2	Game 1	Game 2	Game 3	Game 4	Game 5	Game 6	Game 7
(2) San Miguel Beermen	4–2	(4) TNT KaTropa	102–104	102–88	109–97	97–102	111–102	115–91	—

- Finals MVP: Alex Cabagnot (San Miguel Beermen)
- Best Player of the Conference: Chris Ross (San Miguel Beermen)
- Bobby Parks Best Import of the Conference: Charles Rhodes (San Miguel Beermen)

== 2017 Governors' Cup ==
=== Elimination round ===
Pos	Team	W	L	PCT	GB	Qualification
1	Meralco Bolts	9	2	.818	—	Twice-to-beat in the quarterfinals
2	TNT KaTropa	8	3	.727 (Note: Head-to-head record: Talk 'N Text 1–0 Barangay Ginebra)	1	Twice-to-beat in the quarterfinals
3	Barangay Ginebra San Miguel	8	3	.727	1	Twice-to-beat in the quarterfinals
4	Star Hotshots	7	4	.636 (Note: Head to-head quotient: Star 1.04, NLEX 1.01, San Miguel 0.99, Rain or Shine 0.96)	2	Twice-to-beat in the quarterfinals
5	NLEX Road Warriors	7	4	.636	2	Twice-to-win in the quarterfinals
6	San Miguel Beermen	7	4	.636	2	Twice-to-win in the quarterfinals
7	Rain or Shine Elasto Painters	7	4	.636	2	Twice-to-win in the quarterfinals
8	Blackwater Elite	5	6	.455	4	Twice-to-win in the quarterfinals
9	Alaska Aces	3	8	.273 (Note: Head-to-head record: Alaska 1–0 GlobalPort)	6	
10	GlobalPort Batang Pier	3	8	.273	6	
11	Phoenix Fuel Masters	2	9	.182	7	
12	Kia Picanto	0	11	.000	9	

Source: PBA.ph

=== Playoffs ===
Quarterfinals (Top 4 twice-to-beat)
1	Meralco	91	104
8	Blackwater	92	96
4	Star	89
5	NLEX	77
2	TNT	102	118
7	Rain or Shine	106	114
3	Barangay Ginebra	104
6	San Miguel	84

Semifinals (Best-of-5)
1	Meralco	3
4	Star	0
2	TNT	1
3	Barangay Ginebra	3

Finals (Best-of-7)
1	Meralco	3
3	Barangay Ginebra	4

==== Quarterfinals ====
Team 1	Series	Team 2	Game 1	Game 2
(1) Meralco Bolts*	1–1	(8) Blackwater Elite	91–92	104–96
(2) TNT KaTropa*	1–1	(7) Rain or Shine Elasto Painters	102–106	118–114
(3) Barangay Ginebra San Miguel*	1–0	(6) San Miguel Beermen	104–84	—
(4) Star Hotshots*	1–0	(5) NLEX Road Warriors	89–77	—

*Team has twice-to-beat advantage. Team #1 only has to win once, while Team #2 has to win twice.

==== Semifinals ====
Team 1	Series	Team 2	Game 1	Game 2	Game 3	Game 4	Game 5
(1) Meralco Bolts	3–0	(4) Star Hotshots	72–66	98–74	91–88 (OT)	—	—
(2) TNT KaTropa	1–3	(3) Barangay Ginebra San Miguel	94–121	103–96	103–106	105–115	—

==== Finals ====
Team 1	Series	Team 2	Game 1	Game 2	Game 3	Game 4	Game 5	Game 6	Game 7
(1) Meralco Bolts	3–4	(3) Barangay Ginebra San Miguel	87–102	76–86	94–81	85–83	74–85	98–91	96–101

- Finals MVP: LA Tenorio (Barangay Ginebra)
- Best Player of the Conference: Greg Slaughter (Barangay Ginebra San Miguel)
- Bobby Parks Best Import of the Conference: Allen Durham (Meralco Bolts)

== Individual awards ==
=== Leo Awards ===
- Most Valuable Player: June Mar Fajardo (San Miguel)
- Rookie of the Year: Roger Pogoy (TNT)
- First Mythical Team:
  - Alex Cabagnot (San Miguel)
  - Chris Ross (San Miguel)
  - June Mar Fajardo (San Miguel)
  - Japeth Aguilar (Barangay Ginebra)
  - Arwind Santos (San Miguel)
- Second Mythical Team:
  - Jayson Castro (TNT)
  - LA Tenorio (Barangay Ginebra)
  - Kelly Williams (TNT)
  - Joe Devance (Barangay Ginebra)
  - Cliff Hodge (Meralco)
- All-Defensive Team:
  - Jio Jalalon (Star)
  - Chris Ross (San Miguel)
  - June Mar Fajardo (San Miguel)
  - Japeth Aguilar (Barangay Ginebra)
  - Gabe Norwood (Rain or Shine)
- Most Improved Player: Chris Ross (San Miguel)
- Samboy Lim Sportsmanship Award: Gabe Norwood (Rain or Shine)

=== Awards given by the PBA Press Corps ===
- Defensive Player of the Year: Chris Ross (San Miguel)
- Scoring Champion: Terrence Romeo (GlobalPort)
- Baby Dalupan Coach of the Year: Leo Austria (San Miguel)
- Mr. Quality Minutes: Jio Jalalon (Star)
- Bogs Adornado Comeback Player of the Year: Kelly Williams (TNT)
- Danny Floro Executive of the Year: Ramon S. Ang (San Miguel Corporation teams)
- Order of Merit: LA Tenorio (Barangay Ginebra)
- All-Rookie Team
  - Roger Pogoy (TNT)
  - Jio Jalalon (Star)
  - Matthew Wright (Phoenix)
  - Kevin Ferrer (Barangay Ginebra)
  - Reden Celda (Kia)
- All-Interview Team
  - Tim Cone (Barangay Ginebra)
  - Jayson Castro (TNT)
  - Ranidel de Ocampo (Meralco)
  - Beau Belga (Rain or Shine)
  - LA Tenorio (Barangay Ginebra)
- Game of the Season: Barangay Ginebra San Miguel vs. Star Hotshots (September 3, 2017, Governors' Cup eliminations)

== Statistics ==
=== Individual statistical leaders ===
==== Local players ====
Category	Player	Team	Statistic
Points per game	Terrence Romeo	GlobalPort Batang Pier	23.2
Rebounds per game	June Mar Fajardo	San Miguel Beermen	12.5
Assists per game	Chris Ross	San Miguel Beermen	7.3
Steals per game	Chris Ross	San Miguel Beermen	2.8
Blocks per game	June Mar Fajardo	San Miguel Beermen	2.1
Turnovers per game	Terrence Romeo	GlobalPort Batang Pier	4.1
Fouls per game	Mark Barroca	Star Hotshots	3.5
Minutes per game	Stanley Pringle	GlobalPort Batang Pier	37.1
FG%	June Mar Fajardo	San Miguel Beermen	61.0%
FT%	Mark Yee	Kia Picanto	88.1%
3FG%	Mark Yee	Kia Picanto	50.0%
Double-doubles	June Mar Fajardo	San Miguel Beermen	28

==== Import players ====
Category	Player	Team	Statistic	Conference played
Points per game	Brandon Brown	Phoenix Fuel Masters	34.8	Governors'
Rebounds per game	Greg Smith	Blackwater Elite	22.1	Commissioner's
Assists per game	Michael Craig	TNT KaTropa	6.7	Governors'
Steals per game	Murphy Holloway	GlobalPort Batang Pier	2.9	Governors'
Blocks per game	Brandon Brown	Phoenix Fuel Masters	3.2	Governors'
Turnovers per game	Geron Johnson	Kia Picanto	8.0	Governors'
Fouls per game	Jabril Trawick	GlobalPort Batang Pier	6.0	Governors'
Minutes per game	Henry Walker	Blackwater Elite	44.7	Governors'
FG%	Charles Rhodes	San Miguel Beermen	64.1%	Commissioner's
FT%	LaDontae Henton	Alaska Aces	86.9%	Governors'
3FG%	Sean Williams	GlobalPort Batang Pier	60.0%	Commissioner's
Double-doubles	Justin Brownlee	Barangay Ginebra San Miguel	30	Commissioner's and Governors'
Triple-doubles	Allen Durham	Meralco Bolts	2	Governors'

=== Individual game highs ===
==== Local players ====
Category	Player	Team	Statistic	Conference
Points	Terrence Romeo	GlobalPort Batang Pier	44	Philippine
Rebounds	June Mar Fajardo	San Miguel Beermen	23	Philippine
Assists	Chris Ross	San Miguel Beermen	15	Commissioner's
Steals	Marcio Lassiter	San Miguel Beermen	8	Commissioner's
Blocks	June Mar Fajardo	San Miguel Beermen	7	Philippine
Blocks	John Paul Erram	Blackwater Elite	7	Governors'
Three point field goals	Terrence Romeo	GlobalPort Batang Pier	9	Commissioner's

==== Import players ====
Category	Player	Team	Statistic	Conference
Points	Eugene Phelps	San Miguel Beermen	53	Commissioner's
Rebounds	Ricardo Ratliffe	Star Hotshots	35	Commissioner's
Assists	Allen Durham	Meralco Bolts	13	Governors'
Steals	Glen Rice Jr.	TNT KaTropa	7	Governors'
Blocks	Malcolm White	GlobalPort Batang Pier	6	Commissioner's
Blocks	Tony Mitchell	Star Hotshots	6	Commissioner's
Three point field goals	Donté Greene	TNT KaTropa	7	Commissioner's
Three point field goals	Justin Brownlee	Barangay Ginebra San Miguel	7	Commissioner's
Three point field goals	Geron Johnson	Kia Picanto	7	Governors'
Three point field goals	J'Nathan Bullock (twice)	Rain or Shine Elasto Painters	7	Governors'
Three point field goals	Henry Walker	Blackwater Elite	7	Governors'

=== Team statistical leaders ===
Category	Team	Statistic
Points per game	San Miguel Beermen	102.2
Rebounds per game	Rain or Shine Elasto Painters	51.0
Assists per game	Barangay Ginebra San Miguel	23.7
Steals per game	Alaska Aces	8.0
Blocks per game	Barangay Ginebra San Miguel	5.8
Turnovers per game	NLEX Road Warriors	19.7
FG%	San Miguel Beermen	45.2%
FT%	GlobalPort Batang Pier	72.4%
3FG%	GlobalPort Batang Pier	35.3%

== Cumulative standings ==
Pos	Team	Pld	W	L	PCT	Best finish
1	San Miguel Beermen	58	43	15	.741	Champions
2	Barangay Ginebra San Miguel	64	40	24	.625	Champions
3	Star Hotshots	52	32	20	.615	Semifinalist
4	TNT KaTropa	61	36	25	.590	Finalist
5	Meralco Bolts	48	27	21	.563	Finalist
6	Rain or Shine Elasto Painters	39	19	20	.487	Quarterfinalist
7	Alaska Aces	36	14	22	.389	Quarterfinalist
8	GlobalPort Batang Pier	37	14	23	.378	Quarterfinalist
9	Blackwater Elite	36	13	23	.361	Quarterfinalist
10	Phoenix Fuel Masters	36	12	24	.333	Quarterfinalist
11	NLEX Road Warriors	34	11	23	.324	Quarterfinalist
12	Kia Picanto	33	6	27	.182	Elimination round

=== Elimination rounds ===
Pos	Team	Pld	W	L	PCT
1	San Miguel Beermen	33	26	7	.788
2	Barangay Ginebra San Miguel	33	23	10	.697 (Note: Elimination round head-to-head: Barangay Ginebra 3–0 Star)
3	Star Hotshots	33	23	10	.697
4	TNT KaTropa	33	22	11	.667
5	Meralco Bolts	33	19	14	.576
6	Rain or Shine Elasto Painters	33	17	16	.515
7	Alaska Aces	33	14	19	.424
8	GlobalPort Batang Pier	33	13	20	.394
9	Blackwater Elite	33	12	21	.364 (Note: Elimination round head-to-head: Blackwater 2–1 Phoenix)
10	Phoenix Fuel Masters	33	12	21	.364
11	NLEX Road Warriors	33	11	22	.333
12	Kia Picanto	33	6	27	.182

=== Playoffs ===
Pos	Team	Pld	W	L
1	San Miguel Beermen	25	17	8
2	Barangay Ginebra San Miguel	31	17	14
3	TNT KaTropa	28	14	14
4	Star Hotshots	19	9	10
5	Meralco Bolts	15	8	7
6	Rain or Shine Elasto Painters	6	2	4
7	Blackwater Elite	3	1	2
8	GlobalPort Batang Pier	4	1	3
9	Alaska Aces	3	0	3
10	Phoenix Fuel Masters	3	0	3
11	NLEX Road Warriors	1	0	1
12	Kia Picanto	0	0	0
