= Terrafirma Dyip =

Philippine professional basketball team

- 2025–26 Terrafirma Dyip season
- Founded: 2014
- History: Kia Sorento (2014–15); Kia Carnival (2015); Mahindra Enforcer (2015–16); Mahindra Floodbuster (2016–17); Kia Picanto (2017–18); Columbian Dyip (2018–2020); Terrafirma Dyip (2020–present)
- Team colors: Green, black, navy blue, gray, white
- Company: Terrafirma Realty Development Corporation
- Board governor: Pido Jarencio
- Team manager: Waiyip Chong
- Head coach: Ronald Tubid
- Team captain: Maverick Ahanmisi
- Ownership: Jose Alvarez

The Terrafirma Dyip is a professional basketball team playing in the Philippine Basketball Association (PBA). The team is owned by Terrafirma Realty Development Corporation and originally played under its affiliate company Columbian Autocar Corporation (under the Kia (Sorento, Carnival, Picanto), Mahindra (Enforcer, Floodbuster) and Columbian (Dyip) brands).

== History ==
=== Establishment ===
On April 10, 2014, Columbian Autocar Corporation, along with Manila North Tollways Corporation (NLEX Road Warriors) and Ever Bilena Cosmetics, Inc. (Blackwater Elite) were approved by the PBA Board of Governors to become expansion teams for the 2014–15 PBA season. Upon entry to the PBA, the three teams will select players from a dispersal draft in July consisting of unprotected current PBA players and free agents. They will also get to pick rookies in the 2014 PBA draft in August. On June 9, 2014, the team held a press conference, announcing that boxer Manny Pacquiao will coach their team in the 2014–15 season. After announcing his intentions to join the draft, Pacquiao was picked 11th overall in the first round by the Kia team, thus becoming a playing coach.

A naming contest was held to determine the team's moniker or name. On August 24, 2014, hours after the 2014 PBA draft, Columbian Autocar Corporation president Ginia Domingo announced that they would take the moniker "Sorento", the name of their top-selling Kia sports utility vehicle in the Philippines and United States. Prior to obtaining its official moniker, the team was dubbed as "The Kia Kamao" which is a call back to Pacquiao's nickname "Pambansang Kamao".

=== 2014–2017: Early seasons ===
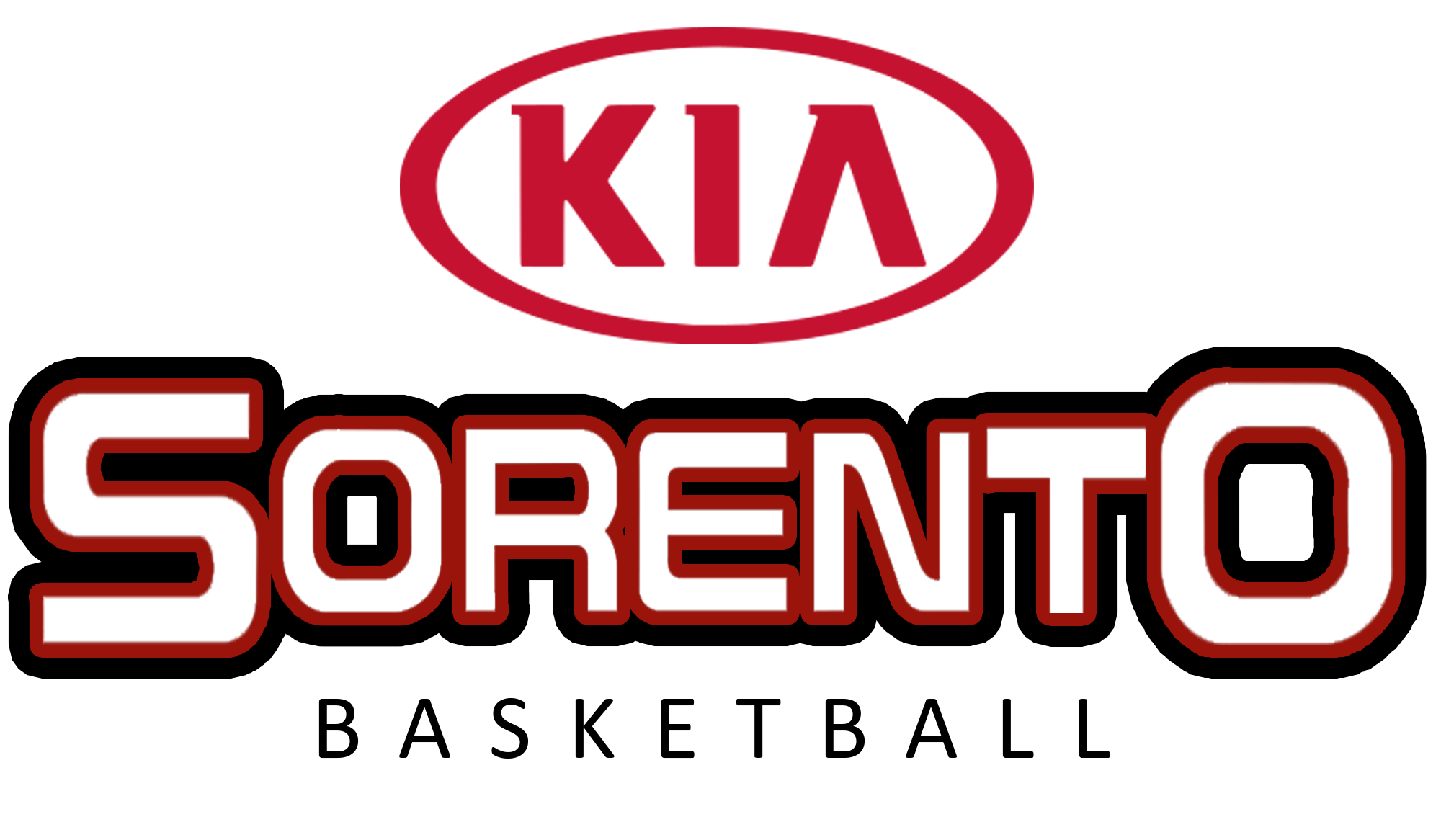
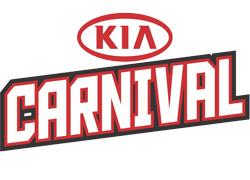
Logos under the Kia Sorento and Kia Carnival monikers during the 2014–15 season.

==== Kia Sorento/Carnival (2014–2015) ====
The Sorento marked their first win in franchise history after they defeated their fellow expansion team Blackwater Elite in the opening of the 2014–15 PBA season at the Philippine Arena. They lost their next ten games and finished 11th in the Philippine Cup.

For the 2015 Commissioner's Cup, the team changed its name to "Kia Carnival" to promote the introduction of the 2015 model of its namesake minivan. The team signed Puerto Rican player Peter John Ramos as their reinforcement.

In the 2015 Governors' Cup, the team selected Senegalese national team center Hamady N'diaye and Taiwanese stalwart Jet Chang as imports. The team created history by having the first Senegalese and Taiwanese imports in the league.

==== Mahindra Enforcer (2015–2016) ====
Logo of the Mahindra Enforcer for the 2015–16 season

On July 15, 2015, team managers Eric Pineda and Joe Ramos announced that the team will play the 2015–16 season as the "Mahindra Enforcer". The name change reflects the thrust of the company to introduce the Mahindra automobile brand.

Mahindra Enforcer became the first team in the PBA to have its own training facility, with the unveiling of "The Hardcourt" on March 12, 2016. The Hardcourt, which also contains a swimming pool, and a weights room, is located within the grounds of Azure Urban Resort and Residences in Bicutan, Parañaque. The facility will also have a basketball shooting machine.

For the 2016 Commissioner's Cup, the team signed the American player Augustus Gilchrist as their reinforcement

During the 2016 Governor's Cup, the Enforcers made their best start in their franchise history with 4–0 record. The franchise also made their first ever PBA playoff appearance but they lost to the Meralco Bolts in the quarterfinals.

==== Mahindra Floodbuster (2016–2017) ====
On October 30, 2016, during the draft day, the team announced that the team will play 2016–17 season as the "Mahindra Floodbuster" to introduce the flood-proof variant of the Mahindra Enforcer, the Floodbuster.

=== 2017–2019: The Rashawn McCarthy era, last seasons under Columbian ===
==== Kia Picanto (2017–2018) ====
On July 6, 2017, seven days before the 2017 Governors' Cup, the team announced that the team will play as the "Kia Picanto" as part of a promotion to introduce a new vehicle model of the same name.

==== Columbian Dyip (2018–2020) ====
The Columbian Dyip's logo from 2018 to 2020

On April 3, 2018, the PBA announced that the team will play as the "Columbian Dyip" starting in the PBA Commissioner's Cup. This is the third brand to be used by the franchise, after Kia and Mahindra.

=== 2020–2024: The Juami Tiongson era starts the Terrafirma Dyip ===
On June 3, 2020, the PBA announced that it has approved Dyip's franchise owner Columbian Autocar Corporation to transfer its franchise to its affiliate company Terra Firma Realty Development Corporation. The name of the team was changed to "Terrafirma Dyip" under the new franchise owner.

In the 2020 Philippine Cup, the only conference of the 2020 season due to the COVID-19 pandemic, Terrafirma had a dismal 1–10 win–loss record.

=== 2024–present: The post-Tiongson era and attempted sale ===
Starhorse Shipping Lines, the owners of the Basilan Starhorse were reportedly negotiating a buyout of Terrafirma's franchise as of February 2025. If successful, the new team would have competed as the "Sea Titans". However the sale was aborted after Starhorse failed to comply with sale requirements set by the PBA. Another buyer, Zamboanga Valientes, a team that once played in the PBA 3x3 in 2021, is reportedly in talks to acquire the franchise of Terrafirma. However the sale likewise was aborted like in the case of Basilan. No more enties are looking to buy the franchise and Terrafirma will continue playing in the 2025–26 PBA season.

== Current roster ==
Terrafirma Dyip roster
Players
Coaches

Pos.	#	POB	Name	Height	Weight	DOB (YYYY–MM–DD)	From
F	0	(Philippines)	Ira Bataller (FA)	6 ft 4 in (1.93 m)		2000–11–19	Letran
G	3	(Philippines)	Juami Tiongson	5 ft 10 in (1.78 m)	175 lb (79 kg)	1991–02–05	Ateneo
G	4	(United States)	Paul Garcia	5 ft 11 in (1.80 m)	170 lb (77 kg)	1999–06–04	Ateneo
C	5	(Philippines)	Keith Zaldivar	6 ft 6 in (1.98 m)		1996–05–25	Adamson
F/C	6	(Philippines)	Louie Sangalang	6 ft 4 in (1.93 m)	198 lb (90 kg)	1998–03–03	Letran
G	8	(United States)	Chris Miller	6 ft 2 in (1.88 m)	180 lb (82 kg)	1993–08–31	Salem
F	9	(Philippines)	CJ Catapusan	6 ft 3 in (1.91 m)		1997–01–29	UP
F	10	(Philippines)	Aljon Mariano	6 ft 3 in (1.91 m)	175 lb (79 kg)	1992–08–03	UST
C	11	(Philippines)	Ben Adamos	6 ft 7 in (2.01 m)	200 lb (91 kg)	1995–12–30	UPHSD
G	13	(United States)	Maverick Ahanmisi (FA)	6 ft 2 in (1.88 m)	190 lb (86 kg)	1991–07–17	Minnesota
C	18	(Philippines)	Geo Chiu	6 ft 10 in (2.08 m)	249 lb (113 kg)	2001–05–18	Ateneo
F	23	(British Hong Kong)	Joseph Eriobu	6 ft 4 in (1.93 m)	198 lb (90 kg)	1992–02–12	Mapúa
G	24	(Philippines)	Mark Nonoy	5 ft 9 in (1.75 m)		2000–07–24	De La Salle
F	26	(Philippines)	JM Bravo	6 ft 4 in (1.93 m)		2000–01–03	Lyceum
F/C	28	(Philippines)	Shawn Umali	6 ft 4 in (1.93 m)	242 lb (110 kg)	2000–12–02	St. Benilde
G/F	30	(Philippines)	Didat Hanapi	6 ft 2 in (1.88 m)		2001–07–31	Adamson
G	38	(Philippines)	Brent Paraiso	6 ft 1 in (1.85 m)	190 lb (86 kg)	1998–02–26	Letran

Head coach

- (Philippines) Ronald Tubid

Assistant coach(es)

- (Philippines) Jeff Napa (1st assistant)
- (Philippines) Alfredo Jarencio II
- (Philippines) Jun Vilarin

Team manager

- (Philippines) Waiyip Chong

Legend

- (C) Team captain
- (CI) Commissioner's Cup Import
- (GI) Governors' Cup Import
- (EI) EASL Import
- (DP) Unsigned draft pick
- (FA) Free agent
- (IN) Inactive
- (S) Suspended
- (R) Rookie
- Injured

Roster

=== Head coaches ===
Terrafima Dyip head coaches
Name	Start	End	Seasons	Overall record				Best finish
Name	Start	End	Seasons	W	L	PCT	G	Best finish
Manny Pacquiao	2014	2017	3	28	73	.385%	101	Quarterfinals
Chris Gavina	2017	2017	1	0	2	.000%	2	DNQ
Ricky Dandan	2017	2018	1	6	4	.600%	20	DNQ
Johnedel Cardel	2018	2024	6	36	121	.298%	157	Quarterfinals
Raymond Tiongco (interim)	2024	2025	1	2	21	.087%	23	DNQ
Ronald Tubid	2025	present						

== Season-by-season records ==
List of the last five conferences completed by the Terrafirma franchise. For the full-season history, see List of Terrafirma Dyip seasons.

Note: GP = Games played, W = Wins, L = Losses, W–L% = Winning percentage

Season	Conference	GP	W	L	W–L%	Finish	Playoffs
2024–25	Commissioner's	12	1	11	.083	13th	Did not qualify
2024–25	Philippine	11	1	10	.091	12th	Did not qualify
2025–26	Philippine	11	1	10	.091	12th	Did not qualify
2025–26	Commissioner's	12	4	8	.333	10th	Did not qualify
2025–26	Governors' Cup	12	5	7	.417	5th (Group A)	Did not qualify
An asterisk (*) indicates one-game playoff; two asterisks (**) indicates team with twice-to-beat advantage

== Awards ==
=== Individual awards ===
PBA Rookie of the Year	PBA All-Defensive Team	PBA Mythical First Team
CJ Perez (2019); Stephen Holt (2023–24)	CJ Perez (2019); Kemark Cariño (2023–24)	CJ Perez (2019)
PBA Mythical Second Team	PBA Most Improved Player	
Stephen Holt (2023–24); Juami Tiongson (2023–24)	Juami Tiongson (2021)	

=== PBA Press Corps Awards ===
All-Rookie Team
- Reden Celda (2016–17)
- CJ Perez (2019)
- Roosevelt Adams (2020)
- Joshua Munzon (2021)
- Kemark Cariño (2023–24)
- Stephen Holt (2023–24)

=== All-Star Weekend ===
Slam Dunk Contest	All - Star Selection
Rey Guevarra (2017)	2017: LA Revilla; 2018: Carlo Lastimosa; Ronald Tubid; 2023: Alex Cabagnot; 2024: Juami Tiongson

== See also ==
- Terrafirma Dyip draft history
