= Terrafirma Dyip draft history =

The Terrafirma Dyip first participated in the Philippine Basketball Association (PBA) draft on August 24, 2014, two months before their first PBA season. The Dyip (then-known as Kia Sorento) entered the league through expansion together with the Blackwater Elite.

Manny Pacquiao became the team's first draft choice, the 11th pick in the 2014 PBA draft. Since then, they have selected four number one draft picks: CJ Perez, Roosevelt Adams, Joshua Munzon, and most recently, Stephen Holt.

== Selections ==
Basketball positions
PG	Point guard
SG	Shooting guard
SF	Small forward
PF	Power forward
C	Center

Draft	Round	Pick	Player	Pos.	Country of birth*	PBA D-League team	College
2014	1	11	Manny Pacquiao	G	Philippines	none	NDDU
2014	2	24	Kyle Pascual	F/C	Philippines	NLEX (D-League)	SBC
2014	3	25	Rene Pacquiao	F	Philippines	Hog's Breath Razorbacks	SWU
2014	3	28	Kenneth Ighalo	F	Philippines	Cagayan Valley Rising Suns	MIT
2014	3	29	Paolo Taha	G	Philippines	Boracay Rum Waves	CSB
2014	3	31	Jeremy Bartolo	F	Philippines	none	Cal State San Bernardino
2014	3	32	Anthony Gavieres	G/F	Philippines	none	VCU
2014	3	35	Richard Cole	F/G	United States	none	NU
2014	3	36	Giorgio Umali	G/F	Philippines	none	SPU
2014	4	37	Jonathan Banal	G	Philippines	Wang's Basketball Couriers	MIT
2014	4	38	Michael Acuña	G	Philippines	none	Perpetual
2014	4	39	Mark Andrei Romero	G/F	Philippines	Jumbo Plastic Linoleum Giants	CSB
2014	4	40	Francis Bercede	G	Philippines	none	USC
2015	1	2	Troy Rosario	PF	Philippines	Hapee Fresh Fighters	National University
2015	2	14	Bradwyn Guinto	C	Philippines	Cebuana Lhuillier Gems	SSC-R
2015	3	24	Leo de Vera	SF	United States	Tanduay Light Rhum Masters	SSC-R
2015	4	35	Michael DiGregorio	SG	United States	KeraMix Mixers	McKendree
2015	5	44	Alli Austria	SG	United States	none	San Francisco State
2015	6	49	Roberto Hainga	C/PF	Philippines	MP Hotel Warriors	UST
2015	7	52	Michael Abad	C/PF	Philippines	LiverMarin Guardians	Mapúa
2016	Special draft		Russel Escoto	F/C	Philippines	Phoenix Accelerators	FEU
2016	2	4	Joseph Eriobu	F	Hong Kong	Caida Tile Masters	Mapúa
2016	3	17	Cedrick Ablaza	F	Philippines	Cagayan Rising Suns	STI
2016	4	19	Jan Niccolo Jamon	G	Philippines	Cafe France Bakers	EAC
2016	5	23	Paolo Pontejos	G	Philippines	Wang's Basketball Couriers	JRU
2017	3	25	Chris de Chavez	G	Philippines	Wang's Basketball Couriers	Ateneo
2017	4	36	Arvie Bringas	F/C	Philippines	Hapee Fresh Fighters; Big Chill Super Chargers	FEU
2017	5	42	Christian Geronimo	G	Philippines	none	PUP
2018	1	1	CJ Perez	G	Hong Kong	Zark's Jawbreakers - LPU	Lyceum
2018	1	11	JP Calvo	G	Philippines	Wang's Basketball Couriers	Letran
2018	2	18	Cyrus Tabi	G	Philippines	Batangas-EAC	RTU
2018	3	23	Teytey Teodoro	G	Philippines	JRU	JRU
2018	4	33	Oliver Arim	F	Philippines	Batangas-EAC	CEU
2019	Special draft		Isaac Go	F/C	Philippines	Cignal - Ateneo	Ateneo
2019	1	1	Roosevelt Adams	G/F	United States	Go for Gold Scratchers	Idaho
2019	1	12	Christian Balagasay	F/C	Philippines	Petron - Letran	Letran
2019	3	25	Bonbon Batiller	G	Philippines	Petron - Letran	UE / Letran
2019	4	36	Marco Balagtas	F	Philippines	Diliman College - Gerry's	José Rizal
Season 46	Special draft		Jordan Heading	G	Australia	none	Cal Baptist
Season 46	1	1	Joshua Munzon	G/F	United States	AMA University Titans	Cal State Los Angeles
Season 46	1	8	James Laput	C	Australia	Marinerong Pilipino Skippers	Young Harris / La Salle
Season 46	3	25	Dhon Reverente	G	Philippines	Marinerong Pilipino Skippers	PMI
Season 46	4	36	Michael Javelosa	F	Philippines	none	Ateneo
Season 46	5	46	Immanuel Custodio	F	Philippines	none	Ateneo de Naga
Season 46	6	54	Terrence Tumalip	G	Philippines	none	TIP
Season 47	1	2	Jeremiah Gray	G/F	United States	none	Dominican
Season 47	3	26	Allen Mina	G/F	Philippines	none	Letran
Season 47	4	38	Shaq Alanes	G	Philippines	none	Lyceum
Season 47	5	46	Sandy Ceñal	F	Philippines	none	RTU
Season 47	6	50	Red Cachuela	F	Philippines	none	Southwestern
Season 48	1	1	Stephen Holt	G	United States	none	Saint Mary's
Season 48	1	12	Taylor Miller	G	United States	none	Westminster (UT)
Season 48	2	13	Kemark Cariño	C	Philippines	none	San Beda
Season 48	2	22	Louie Sangalang	F	Philippines	none	Letran
Season 48	3	25	JB Bahio	C	Philippines	none	San Beda
Season 48	4	36	Tommy Olivario	G	Philippines	none	Letran
Season 48	5	47	Damie Cuntapay	C/F	Philippines	none	San Beda
Season 48	6	58	Kenneth Villapando	F	Philippines	none	SSC-R
Season 48	7	65	Jeric Pido	G	Philippines	none	Mapúa
Season 48	8	70	Enrique Caunan	F	Philippines	none	UST
Season 49
Season 49	1	10	Mark Nonoy	G	Philippines	none	De La Salle
Season 49	2	15	CJ Catapusan	F	Philippines	none	UP
Season 49	3	27	Peter Alfaro	G	Philippines	none	San Beda
Season 50
Season 50	1	1	Geo Chiu	C	Philippines	none	Ateneo
Season 50	2	18	Shawn Umali	C/PF	Philippines	none	Benilde
Season 50	3	25	Orin Catacutan	SG/SF	Philippines	none	UE
Season 50	4	36	Dolan Adlawan	PF	Philippines	none	USC
Season 50	5	47	Royce Alforque	PG	Philippines	none	FEU
Season 50	6	56	JM Bravo	SF/PF	Philippines	none	Lyceum
Season 50	7	62	Ira Bataller	PF	Philippines	none	Letran
Season 50	8	67	Claude Camit	PG/SG	Philippines	none	UB
Season 50	9	71	Tristan Medina	SG	Philippines	none	PCC
Season 50	10	74	Franz Diaz	PG	Philippines	none	CEU

=== Notes ===
1.All players entering the draft are Filipinos until proven otherwise.
