= 2020 PBA Philippine Cup finals =

Basketball cup finals

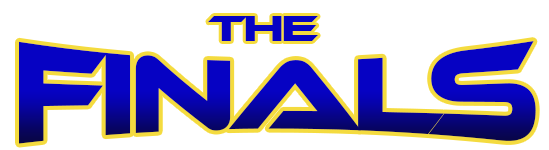
Team	Coach	Wins
(1) Barangay Ginebra San Miguel	Tim Cone	4
(3) TNT Tropang Giga	Bong Ravena	1
- Dates: November 29 – December 9, 2020
- MVP: LA Tenorio (Barangay Ginebra San Miguel)
- Television: Local: One Sports; TV5; PBA Rush (HD); International: AksyonTV International
- Announcers: see Broadcast notes
- Radio network: Radyo5 (DWFM)

Referees
- Game 1: R. Yante, R. Gruta, J. Narandan, J. Baldago
- Game 2: P. Balao, J. Mariano, M., J. Tantay
- Game 3: N. Quilinguen, R. Gruta, M., J. Nicandro
- Game 4: P. Balao, R. Yante, J., M. Orioste
- Game 5: N. Quilinguen, R. Gruta, M., M. Orioste

PBA Philippine Cup finals chronology
- < 2019 2021 >

PBA finals chronology
- < 2019 Governors' 2021 Philippine >

The 2020 Philippine Basketball Association (PBA) Philippine Cup finals was the best-of-7 championship series of the 2020 PBA Philippine Cup, the lone conference of the season. The Barangay Ginebra San Miguel and the TNT Tropang Giga competed for the 42nd Philippine Cup championship and the 128th overall championship contested by the league. For the first time in six seasons and after winning the previous five titles, the San Miguel Beermen was not able to defend their Philippine Cup title after being eliminated by the Meralco Bolts in the quarterfinals.

This was the first time that the two teams met in the Philippine Cup finals since the 2004–05 season when Barangay Ginebra won the championship against Talk 'N Text, four games to two.

Barangay Ginebra defeated TNT, four games to one, to win the franchise's fourth Philippine Cup (13 years after their last Philippine Cup championship in 2007) and their 13th title overall. LA Tenorio was named the Finals MVP.

== Background ==
=== Barangay Ginebra San Miguel ===
Before the season started, Barangay Ginebra suffered a major blow when Greg Slaughter decided to take a break from basketball, following the expiration of his contract. Barangay Ginebra added Arvin Tolentino, Jerrick Balanza, and Kent Salado to the roster after selecting them in the 2019 PBA draft.

Barangay Ginebra started the season with four straight wins. However, they suffered from two straight setbacks after losing to Magnolia and Rain or Shine. Barangay Ginebra would eventually go 4–1 over their final five games to finish the eliminations round with an 8–3 record. Their record was tied with Phoenix Super LPG for the best in the league, but Barangay Ginebra took the first seed as they defeated Phoenix Super LPG in the eliminations. They advanced to the quarterfinals, holding a twice-to-beat advantage.

In the quarterfinals, Barangay Ginebra faced off against Rain or Shine. They defeated them in one game, 81–73, to advance to the semifinals. In the best-of-5 semifinals, Barangay Ginebra faced off against Meralco. This marked the fifth time in the last five years that both teams met in the playoffs. The series went to the distance after the two teams alternated wins in the first four games. In the do-or-die game 5, both teams were tied at 80 with 14.5 seconds left. In the game's final possession, Scottie Thompson drilled the game winning triple with 0.6 seconds left to send Barangay Ginebra to the Philippine Cup finals.

=== TNT Tropang Giga ===
Before the season started, TNT, NLEX, and Blackwater completed a three-team trade that sent Poy Erram, a former Defensive Player of the Year, to TNT.

TNT started the season strong after pulling off five straight wins. However, TNT struggled over their last six games, going 2–4 to finish the eliminations round with a 7–4 record, tied for the second best in the league. TNT would eventually get the third seed after quotients were applied. As part of the top 4 seeded teams, TNT advanced to the quarterfinals with a twice-to-beat advantage.

In the quarterfinals, TNT faced off against Alaska. They would advance to the semifinals after defeating Alaska in one game, 104–83. In the semifinals, TNT faced Phoenix, who held the second seed. After winning the first game, TNT fell to the brink of elimination after losing two straight games. TNT would eventually bounce back, defeating Phoenix in the final two games to advance to the Philippine Cup finals.

=== Road to the finals ===
Barangay Ginebra San Miguel		TNT Tropang Giga
Finished 8–3 (.727) in 1st place with Phoenix Super LPG	Elimination round	Finished 7–4 (.636) in 3rd place with San Miguel, Meralco, Alaska and Magnolia
Barangay Ginebra 1–0 Phoenix	Tiebreaker	Head-to-head quotient: TNT 1.074, San Miguel 1.023, Meralco 0.992, Alaska 0.959, Magnolia 0.955 (3rd place)
Def. Rain or Shine in one game (twice-to-beat advantage)	Quarterfinals	Def. Alaska in one game (twice-to-beat advantage)
Def. Meralco, 3–2	Semifinals	Def. Phoenix Super LPG, 3–2

=== Head-to-head matchup ===
TV5

November 6
6:45 pm

Box score

Barangay Ginebra San Miguel 85, TNT Tropang Giga 79
Scoring by quarter: 20–11, 16–21, 28–25, 21–22
Pts: Pringle 28; Rebs: Pringle 12; Asts: Tenorio 9	Pts: Castro 19; Rebs: Parks 13; Asts: Castro, Rosario 3

AUF Sports Arena & Cultural Center, Angeles City
Referees: N. Quilinguen, R. Gruta, J. Narandan, J. Baldago

== Series summary ==
Game	Date	Venue	Winner	Result
Game 1	November 29	AUF Sports and Cultural Center	Barangay Ginebra	100–94 (OT)
Game 2	December 2	AUF Sports and Cultural Center	Barangay Ginebra	92–90
Game 3	December 4	AUF Sports and Cultural Center	TNT	88–67
Game 4	December 6	AUF Sports and Cultural Center	Barangay Ginebra	98–88
Game 5	December 9	AUF Sports and Cultural Center	Barangay Ginebra	82–78

== Game summaries ==
=== Game 1 ===
TV5

November 29
6:00 pm

Box score

Barangay Ginebra San Miguel 100, TNT Tropang Giga 94 (OT)
Scoring by quarter: 22–27, 19–14, 25–30, 26–21, Overtime: 8–2
Pts: J. Aguilar 25; Rebs: J. Aguilar 16; Asts: Tenorio 10	Pts: Parks 20; Rebs: Erram 10; Asts: Castro 5
Barangay Ginebra leads series, 1–0

AUF Sports Arena & Cultural Center, Angeles City
Referees: R. Yante, R. Gruta, J. Narandan, J. Baldago

Barangay Ginebra won game 1, 100–94, in overtime to take a 1–0 series lead. Japeth Aguilar led Barangay Ginebra with 25 points and 16 rebounds on an efficient 11–14 shooting while Stanley Pringle had 24 points, 7 rebounds, and 7 assists. Three other players scored in double digits for Ginebra. Bobby Ray Parks Jr. paced the scoring for TNT with 20 points before fouling out in overtime.

In the first quarter, TNT started off strong, leading by as much as 7 before taking a 5 point lead heading to the second quarter. Scoring slowed down in the second quarter, with Barangay Ginebra outscoring TNT, 19–14, to tie the game heading into halftime. Barangay Ginebra began to pull away in the third quarter as they led by as much as 9 with 6:55 left in the quarter. However, TNT went on a 20–6 run to end the quarter with a 5 point lead. Both teams went back-and-forth in the fourth quarter. In the final minutes of regulation, TNT hit three consecutive three pointers to take a 1 point lead with 36 seconds left. Barangay Ginebra had a chance to take the lead but Pringle lost the ball out of bounds. Parks was fouled on the ensuing possession, but he split his free throws. With 11 seconds to go, LA Tenorio drove to the basket before passing to a cutting Arvin Tolentino, who hit the game-tying layup with 5 seconds left. With a chance to win, Jayson Castro missed a floater before time expired.

In overtime, TNT struggled to find its offense, scoring only 2 points in overtime as Barangay Ginebra slowly pulled away. Barangay Ginebra effectively sealed the game when Tenorio found a wide open Aguilar for an uncontested dunk, giving them a 6 point lead with 19 seconds left.

=== Game 2 ===
TV5

December 2
6:00 pm

Box score

Barangay Ginebra San Miguel 92, TNT Tropang Giga 90
Scoring by quarter: 21–17, 15–23, 32–30, 24–20
Pts: Pringle 34; Rebs: Mariano, Thompson 9 Asts: Pringle 8	Pts: Pogoy 38; Rebs: Erram 11; Asts: Castro 6
Barangay Ginebra leads series, 2–0

AUF Sports Arena & Cultural Center, Angeles City
Referees: P. Balao, J. Mariano, M., J. Tantay

After trailing by as much as 15 in the third quarter, Barangay Ginebra came back to win game 2, 92–90, to take a 2–0 lead in the series. Stanley Pringle led Barangay Ginebra with 34 points, 6 rebounds, and 8 assists while Aljon Mariano was an X-factor off the bench, scoring 20 points as the other role players for Barangay Ginebra struggled. For TNT, they were dealt a big blow before game 2 when Bobby Ray Parks Jr., the team's leading scorer, was listed as doubtful to play after he suffered from a left calf strain in game 1. In Parks' absence, Roger Pogoy waxed hot for TNT, scoring 38 points.

The game started off slow for both teams, with Barangay Ginebra taking a 4 point lead, 21–17, heading to the second quarter. Pringle provided most of the offense for Barangay Ginebra, scoring 12 points in that quarter alone. In the second quarter, Pogoy started to hit his shots while Barangay Ginebra continued to struggle from the field. The two teams headed to halftime with TNT holding a 4 point lead. TNT began to pull away in the third quarter, starting with a 14–3 run to erect their biggest lead of the game at 15. Pogoy did most of the damage as he scored 15 points in the quarter alone. However, Barangay Ginebra managed to claw their way back using a lineup that featured only one starter in Pringle. Pringle and Mariano combined for 24 points in the third to cut TNT's lead to 2 heading into the final quarter.

In the fourth quarter, both teams remained close, with TNT holding the lead for most of the quarter. With 4 minutes left, Pogoy hit a three pointer that gave TNT a 7 point lead. Barangay Ginebra answered with a 7–0 run that tied the game with 2 minutes left. After the two teams traded misses, with 53 seconds to go, Jayson Castro was fouled while he was going for the offensive rebound. Castro split his free throws to give TNT a 1 point lead. On the ensuing possession, Pringle found Scottie Thompson for a wide open three that went in, giving Barangay Ginebra a 2 point lead with 30 seconds to go. The three was Thompson's only points and field goal in the game. With a chance to tie or take the lead, Castro missed a three pointer but LA Tenorio split his free throws, still making it a one-possession game. With a chance to send the game to overtime, Pogoy missed his three pointer as Tenorio sealed the game at the foul line.

=== Game 3 ===
TV5

December 4
6:00 pm

Box score

Barangay Ginebra San Miguel 67, TNT Tropang Giga 88
Scoring by quarter: 26–21, 8–23, 22–22, 11–22
Pts: Tenorio 19; Rebs: J. Aguilar 9 Asts: Tenorio 6	Pts: Pogoy 18; Rebs: Erram 14; Asts: Castro 10
Barangay Ginebra leads series, 2–1

AUF Sports Arena & Cultural Center, Angeles City
Referees: N. Quilinguen, R. Gruta, M., J. Nicandro

TNT avoided an 0–3 hole after dominating Barangay Ginebra in game 3, 88–67, cutting Barangay Ginebra's series lead to 2–1. For the second straight game, TNT missed the services of their leading scorer, Bobby Ray Parks Jr. However, TNT had a balanced scoring effort, with Roger Pogoy scoring a team-high 19 points. Four other players scored in double figures for TNT. LA Tenorio paced Barangay Ginebra with 19 points but the other players struggled. After scoring 34 in game 2, Stanley Pringle was limited to 11 points.

In the first quarter, Barangay Ginebra raced off to an early 9 point lead but TNT was able to cut the lead to 5 at the end of the quarter. Tenorio started the game strong, scoring 12 points including 4 three pointers. TNT would start the second quarter with an 11–0 run to take the lead as Barangay Ginebra struggled to score. TNT outscored Barangay Ginebra, 23–8, in the quarter to take a 10 point lead into halftime. TNT would extend their lead to as much as 15 in the third quarter but much like in game 2, Barangay Ginebra would stage a rally, cutting their deficit to 2. However, TNT ended the third quarter with a 10–2 run, extending their lead to 10 before the fourth quarter. TNT would not look back as they continued to extend their lead in the final quarter.

=== Game 4 ===
TV5

December 6
6:00 pm

Box score

Barangay Ginebra San Miguel 98, TNT Tropang Giga 88
Scoring by quarter: 17–14, 32–25, 27–21, 22–28
Pts: J. Aguilar, Tenorio 22; Rebs: Caperal 12; Asts: Thompson 9	Pts: Pogoy 34; Rebs: Erram 16; Asts: Pogoy, Rosario 6
Barangay Ginebra leads series, 3–1

AUF Sports Arena & Cultural Center, Angeles City
Referees: P. Balao, R. Yante, J., M. Orioste

Barangay Ginebra moved to within 1 win away from taking the Philippine Cup title after defeating TNT, 98–88, to take a commanding 3–1 lead. Japeth Aguilar and LA Tenorio led Ginebra with 22 points apiece while Stanley Pringle added 16 of his own. Scottie Thompson had a near triple-double with 11 points, 11 rebounds, and 9 assists. For TNT, Roger Pogoy paced their scoring once again with 34 points. Poy Erram and Troy Rosario added 19 and 16, respectively. They played their third straight game without Bobby Ray Parks Jr. Adding to their injury woes, Jayson Castro aggravated a left knee injury in the third quarter. He did not return for the rest of the game.

Both teams started slow in the first quarter, with Barangay Ginebra taking a 17–14 lead heading into the second quarter. The scored remained close in the second quarter before Barangay Ginebra went on an 8–0 run to go to halftime with a 10 point lead. Barangay Ginebra continued to outplay TNT in the third quarter, extending their lead to as much as 17 before heading into the final quarter with a 16 point lead. In the fourth quarter, Barangay Ginebra extended their lead further to 18 points before TNT staged a big rally. Pogoy waxed hot, scoring 16 of his 34 in the final quarter to lead TNT's rally. Back-to-back three pointers from Pogoy cut Barangay Ginebra's lead to just 3 with 2:50 left. Tenorio answered with a three pointer of his own before Pogoy hit his third consecutive three to make it a one-possession game once again. Tenorio would answer once again with another three to bring their lead back to 6 with 1:43 left. TNT would fail to score for the rest of the game as Barangay Ginebra sealed the win with a layup from Thompson and a mid-range jumper from Tenorio.

=== Game 5 ===
TV5

December 9
6:00 pm

Box score

Barangay Ginebra San Miguel 82, TNT Tropang Giga 78
Scoring by quarter: 19–19, 19–17, 17–20, 27–22
Pts: J. Aguilar 32; Rebs: J. Aguilar 9 Asts: Pringle, Tenorio 6	Pts: Pogoy 23; Rebs: Erram 15; Asts: Enciso 5
Barangay Ginebra wins series, 4–1

AUF Sports Arena & Cultural Center, Angeles City
Referees: N. Quilinguen, R. Gruta, M., M. Orioste

Barangay Ginebra defeated TNT in game 5, 82–78, to win the franchise's 4th Philippine Cup and their 13th title overall. The title was also Barangay Ginebra's second consecutive title after winning last year's Governors' Cup title. Japeth Aguilar led Barangay Ginebra in scoring with 32 points, tying his career-high. Stanley Pringle had 13 points, with 11 of those coming in the crucial fourth quarter after he struggled from the field in the first three quarters. LA Tenorio added 10 points and 6 assists and he was named Finals MVP for the fourth time in his career. For TNT, Roger Pogoy once again top-scored with 23 points. Poy Erram, Simon Enciso, and Troy Rosario added 18, 17, and 12 points respectively. TNT struggled to find offense from their bench as they were limited to just 2 bench points. Jayson Castro and Bobby Ray Parks Jr. did not play due to their injuries.

In the first quarter, TNT came out with more energy as they held a 7 point lead early on. Barangay Ginebra would end the quarter with a 9–2 run to tie the game at 19 heading to the second quarter. After picking up two early fouls in the opening quarter, Aguilar scored 16 of Barangay Ginebra's 19 points in the second quarter. Barangay Ginebra led TNT, 38–36, going into halftime. TNT threatened to pull away in the third quarter, unleashing a 12–1 run to lead by 7. Pogoy scored 11 points in the quarter after struggling from the field in the first half. However, Barangay Ginebra slowly came back as the quarter ended with TNT taking a 1 point lead.

In the fourth quarter, Barangay Ginebra started with a 9–2 run to take a 6 point lead. Pringle, who was limited to 2 points on 1–10 shooting in the first three quarters, scored the first 5 points for Barangay Ginebra in the quarter. Later in the quarter, TNT countered with an 11–0 run of their own to take a 5 point lead with 5 minutes left in the game. However, Barangay Ginebra unleashed a 12–0 run to take a 7 point lead with less than a minute left. During the run, Pringle knocked down back-to-back three pointers that gave Barangay Ginebra a 76–73 lead with 3:18 left. TNT struggled to score during the finishing minutes of the game while Aguilar scored on an alley-oop dunk and Joe Devance scored on a layup to cap Barangay Ginebra's run. TNT cut the lead to 3 with 9 seconds left but Tenorio clinched the game and the title with two free-throws.

== Rosters ==
Barangay Ginebra San Miguel roster
Players
Coaches

Pos.	#	POB	Name	Height	Weight	DOB (YYYY–MM–DD)	From
G/F	2	(United States)	Jared Dillinger	6 ft 4 in (1.93 m)	220 lb (100 kg)	1984–01–06	Hawaiʻi
G	3	(Philippines)	Kent Salado (R)	5 ft 9 in (1.75 m)		1995–11–10	Arellano
G	5	(Philippines)	LA Tenorio	5 ft 8 in (1.73 m)	151 lb (68 kg)	1984–07–09	Ateneo
G	6	(Philippines)	Scottie Thompson	6 ft 1 in (1.85 m)	180 lb (82 kg)	1993–07–12	UPHSD
F	10	(Philippines)	Arvin Tolentino (R)	6 ft 5 in (1.96 m)	210 lb (95 kg)	1995–11–05	Far Eastern
G	11	(United States)	Stanley Pringle	6 ft 1 in (1.85 m)	190 lb (86 kg)	1987–03–05	Penn State
F/C	12	(Philippines)	Prince Caperal	6 ft 7 in (2.01 m)	230 lb (104 kg)	1993–06–12	Arellano
G/F	16	(Philippines)	Jeff Chan	6 ft 2 in (1.88 m)	185 lb (84 kg)	1983–02–11	Far Eastern
F	18	(Philippines)	Arthur dela Cruz	6 ft 4 in (1.93 m)	210 lb (95 kg)	1992–05–09	San Beda
F	23	(Philippines)	Raymond Aguilar	6 ft 4 in (1.93 m)	200 lb (91 kg)	1985–07–27	National-U
F/C	25	(Philippines)	Japeth Aguilar	6 ft 9 in (2.06 m)	235 lb (107 kg)	1987–01–25	Western Kentucky
F	31	(Philippines)	Aljon Mariano	6 ft 3 in (1.91 m)	175 lb (79 kg)	1992–08–03	UST
F	38	(United States)	Joe Devance (C)	6 ft 7 in (2.01 m)	225 lb (102 kg)	1982–02–19	UTEP
G	47	(Philippines)	Mark Caguioa	6 ft 1 in (1.85 m)	185 lb (84 kg)	1979–11–19	Glendale CC (CA)
G	70	(Philippines)	Jerrick Balanza (R)	6 ft 1 in (1.85 m)	190 lb (86 kg)	1996–09–06	Letran

Head coach

- (United States) Tim Cone

Assistant coach(es)

- (Philippines) Richard del Rosario (1st assistant)
- (Philippines) Freddie Abuda
- (United States) Kirk Collier
- (Philippines) Olsen Racela

Team manager

- (Philippines) Alfrancis Chua^{[a]}
- (Philippines) Raymond Rodriguez (assistant)

Legend

- (C) Team captain
- (CI) Commissioner's Cup Import
- (GI) Governors' Cup Import
- (EI) EASL Import
- (DP) Unsigned draft pick
- (FA) Free agent
- (IN) Inactive
- (S) Suspended
- (R) Rookie
- Injured

Roster

- ^{a} Also serves as Barangay Ginebra's board governor.

TNT Tropang Giga roster
Players
Coaches

Pos.	#	POB	Name	Height	Weight	DOB (YYYY–MM–DD)	From
G	0	(United States)	Simon Enciso	5 ft 11 in (1.80 m)	185 lb (84 kg)	1991–02–12	Notre Dame de Namur
G	1	(Philippines)	Bobby Ray Jr. Parks	6 ft 4 in (1.93 m)	215 lb (98 kg)	1993–02–19	National-U
F	4	(United States)	Harvey Carey	6 ft 3 in (1.91 m)	210 lb (95 kg)	1979–03–18	Sonoma State
C	7	(Philippines)	Poy Erram	6 ft 8 in (2.03 m)	227 lb (103 kg)	1989–07–07	Ateneo
F	9	(Philippines)	Samboy de Leon	6 ft 3 in (1.91 m)	190 lb (86 kg)	1992–03–09	Centro Escolar
G	10	(Philippines)	Ryan Reyes (C)	6 ft 2 in (1.88 m)	190 lb (86 kg)	1983–08–10	Cal State Fullerton
G	11	(United States)	Val Chauca (R / IN)	5 ft 10 in (1.78 m)		1994–10–11	Adamson
G	12	(Philippines)	Jjay Alejandro	5 ft 11 in (1.80 m)		1995–04–13	National-U
F	14	(Australia)	David Semerad	6 ft 4 in (1.93 m)	220 lb (100 kg)	1991–04–25	San Beda
G	15	(Philippines)	Kib Montalbo (R)	6 ft 0 in (1.83 m)	155 lb (70 kg)	1995–04–02	De La Salle
G/F	16	(Philippines)	Roger Pogoy	6 ft 2 in (1.88 m)	180 lb (82 kg)	1992–06–16	Far Eastern
G	17	(Philippines)	Jayson Castro	5 ft 10 in (1.78 m)	185 lb (84 kg)	1986–06–30	Philippine Christian
F	18	(Philippines)	Troy Rosario	6 ft 7 in (2.01 m)	198 lb (90 kg)	1992–01–20	National-U
F/C	23	(Philippines)	Jay Washington	6 ft 7 in (2.01 m)	210 lb (95 kg)	1981–10–10	Eckerd
G	26	(Philippines)	Almond Vosotros	5 ft 10 in (1.78 m)	165 lb (75 kg)	1990–01–26	De La Salle
F/C	34	(Philippines)	Lervin Flores	6 ft 5 in (1.96 m)	185 lb (84 kg)	1992–09–26	Arellano
F/C	–	(Philippines)	Chris Javier	6 ft 4 in (1.93 m)	200 lb (91 kg)	1992–12–06	UE

Head coach

- (Philippines) Bong Ravena

Assistant coach(es)

- (Philippines) Sandy Arespacochaga (1st assistant)
- (Philippines) Yuri Escueta
- (United States) Alton Lister
- (Philippines) Joshua Reyes
- (Philippines) Ranidel de Ocampo
- (New Zealand) Mark Dickel (consultant)

Team manager

- (Philippines) Gabby Cui
- (Philippines) Miguel Fernandez (assistant)

Legend

- (C) Team captain
- (CI) Commissioner's Cup Import
- (GI) Governors' Cup Import
- (EI) EASL Import
- (DP) Unsigned draft pick
- (FA) Free agent
- (IN) Inactive
- (S) Suspended
- (R) Rookie
- Injured

Roster

== Broadcast notes ==
The Philippine Cup finals were aired on TV5 with simulcasts on One Sports and PBA Rush (both in standard and high definition). TV5's radio arm, Radyo5 provided the radio play-by-play coverage.

One Sports provided online livestreaming via their official YouTube account and Facebook fan page using the TV5 feed.

The PBA Rush broadcast provided English-language coverage of the finals.

Due to COVID-19 restrictions, the TV and radio panel are doing commentaries offsite from the TV5 Media Center in Mandaluyong.

Game	TV5		PBA Rush (English)		Courtside reporters
Game	Play-by-play	Analyst(s)	Play-by-play	Analyst(s)	Courtside reporters
Game 1	Magoo Marjon	Ryan Gregorio	Aaron Atayde	Dominic Uy	Selina Dagdag-Alas and Denise Tan
Game 2	Chuck Araneta	Dominic Uy	Jutt Sulit	Jett Manuel	Selina Dagdag-Alas and Denise Tan
Game 3	James Velasquez	Ryan Gregorio	Chiqui Reyes	Topex Robinson	Selina Dagdag-Alas and Denise Tan
Game 4	Charlie Cuna	Jason Webb	Aaron Atayde	Norman Black	Selina Dagdag-Alas and Denise Tan
Game 5	Magoo Marjon	Yeng Guiao	Jutt Sulit	Dominic Uy	Selina Dagdag-Alas and Denise Tan

- Additional Game 5 crew:
  - Trophy presentation: Carlo Pamintuan
  - Celebration interviewers: Selina Dagdag-Alas and Denise Tan
