= Phoenix Super LPG Fuel Masters all-time roster =

The following is a list of players, both past and current, who appeared in at least one game for the Phoenix Fuel Masters PBA franchise. Statistics are accurate as of the 2024 PBA Philippine Cup.

== Players ==
^	Denotes player who is currently on the Fuel Masters roster								
^{+}	Denotes player who played as an import for the Fuel Masters								
G	Guard	G/F	Guard-forward	F	Forward	F/C	Forward-center	C	Center

Player	Place of birth	Pos.	From	Yrs.	Seasons	Statistics					Ref.
Player	Place of birth	Pos.	From	Yrs.	Seasons	GP	MP	PTS	REB	AST	Ref.
Dylan Ababou	Philippines	G/F	UST	1	2017	3	11	0	1	0	
Calvin Abueva	Philippines	F	San Sebastian	3	2018–2020	44	1,284	663	480	167	
Ben Adamos	Philippines	F/C	UPHSD	1	2022–2023	17	70	20	17	5	
Kenny Adeleke^{+}	Nigeria	F	Hartford	1	2016	2	70	31	41	1	
Jjay Alejandro^	Philippines	G	National-U	2	2023–present	40	542	229	47	52	
Gelo Alolino	Philippines	G	National-U	2	2017–2018	53	747	320	89	65	
Sean Anthony	Canada	F	McGill	2	2021–2022	19	461	202	121	56	
Cyrus Baguio	Philippines	G/F	UST	2	2016–2017	40	989	355	124	111	
Chris Banchero	United States	G	Seattle Pacific	1	2021	14	430	172	49	58	
Mac Baracael	Philippines	F	Far Eastern	1	2016	11	228	104	29	12	
Mark Borboran	Philippines	F	UE	2	2016–2017	39	631	242	127	32	
Rodney Brondial	Philippines	F/C	Adamson	1	2016	11	164	54	61	4	
Brandon Brown^{+}	United States	F/C	Cal State San Bernardino	1	2017	6	255	209	106	22	
Ronjay Buenafe	Philippines	G	Emilio Aguinaldo	1	2016	13	147	67	16	8	
Michael Calisaan	Philippines	F	San Sebastian	1	2021	9	67	14	14	2	
Simon Camacho^	Philippines	F	Adamson	3	2021–present	57	450	99	114	17	
Prince Caperal	Philippines	F/C	Arellano	2	2016–2017	23	306	102	82	5	
Jeff Chan	Philippines	G/F	Far Eastern	2	2017–2018	26	768	332	107	98	
Justin Chua	Philippines	F/C	Ateneo	4	2017–2022	109	2,155	863	490	77	
Jam Cortes	Philippines	F	Letran	1	2017–2018	4	12	0	3	1	
Mark Cruz	Philippines	G	Letran	1	2016	12	170	55	15	23	
Matthew Daves^	Canada	F	Ateneo	1	2023–present	24	178	56	27	3	
Karl Dehesa	United States	G	Waldorf	2	2017–2018	39	436	133	46	32	
Nick Demusis	Philippines	G	Whittier	1	2021–2022	23	230	67	67	7	
Ron Dennison	Philippines	G	Far Eastern	1	2019	29	175	41	38	17	
Robert Dozier^{+}	United States	F	Memphis	1	2019	2	82	34	28	3	
Simon Enciso	United States	G	Notre Dame de Namur	2	2016–2017	26	780	273	57	97	
Joseph Eriobu	British Hong Kong	F	Mapúa	2	2017–2018	35	365	173	85	13	
Bryan Faundo	Philippines	F/C	Letran	1	2021	3	14	2	2	0	
James Forrester	Canada	G/F	Arellano	1	2016	3	16	6	1	1	
Jeric Fortuna	Philippines	G	UST	1	2016	2	18	4	3	5	
Mike Gamboa	Philippines	G	Philippines	3	2017–2020	32	166	48	17	25	
RR Garcia^	Philippines	G	Far Eastern	6	2016; 2019–present	120	1,910	749	209	231	
Alonzo Gee^{+}	United States	F	Alabama	1	2019	4	178	126	40	10	
Jollo Go	Philippines	G	De La Salle	1	2023	8	21	3	0	0	
Rey Guevarra	Philippines	G/F	Letran	2	2017–2019	18	75	34	9	3	
Paul Harris^{+}	United States	F	Syracuse	1	2021	5	168	88	60	23	
Marvin Hayes	Philippines	F	José Rizal	3	2016–2018	21	93	24	10	8	
Brian Heruela	Philippines	G	Cebu	1	2020	17	338	91	49	36	
Richard Howell^{+}	United States	C	NC State	1	2019	9	326	205	150	25	
JC Intal	Philippines	F	Ateneo	5	2016–2020	123	2,268	817	421	175	
Jeff Javillonar	Philippines	G/F	National-U	1	2016	4	13	1	4	0	
RJ Jazul^	Philippines	G	Letran	7	2017–present	202	5,102	1,902	543	504	
Jens Knuttel	Germany	G	Far Eastern	1	2016	3	10	0	0	1	
Doug Kramer	Philippines	F/C	Ateneo	3	2016–2019	90	1,336	340	394	46	
Chris Lalata^	Philippines	F	Olivarez	2	2022–present	48	287	96	41	9	
Chico Lanete	Philippines	G	Lyceum	2	2016–2017	48	555	173	56	60	
Lee Gwan-hee^{+}	South Korea	G	Yonsei	1	2016	13	245	116	42	20	
Kurt Lojera	Philippines	G	De La Salle	1	2022–2023	18	139	50	15	3	
Alex Mallari	United States	G/F	Lewis–Clark State	2	2019–2020	48	1144	364	162	134	
Sean Manganti^	United States	F	Adamson	3	2021–present	61	933	331	127	45	
Vic Manuel	Philippines	F	PSBA	1	2021	11	229	141	58	16	
Dave Marcelo	Philippines	F/C	San Beda	2	2019–2020	52	515	144	104	25	
Du'Vaughn Maxwell^^{+}	United States	F	Hampton	2	2022–present	16	665	379	203	67	
Jameel McKay^{+}	United States	F/C	Iowa State	1	2017	11	461	262	190	29	
Aljun Melecio	Philippines	G	De La Salle	2	2021–2022	32	356	153	41	41	
Jaypee Mendoza	Philippines	F	San Beda	2	2018–2019	43	587	137	111	28	
Michael Miranda	Philippines	F/C	San Sebastian	2	2016–2017	31	175	47	40	5	
Javee Mocon^	Philippines	F	San Beda	2	2022–present	56	1,677	552	345	129	
Emman Monfort	Philippines	G	Ateneo	1	2016	11	201	57	23	38	
Larry Muyang^	Philippines	F/C	Letran	3	2021–present	67	654	269	168	17	
Jorey Napoles	Philippines	F	TIP	3	2019–2021	40	377	113	86	10	
Jake Pascual	Philippines	F	San Beda	2	2021–2022	39	456	102	118	29	
Mick Pennisi	Australia	C	Eastern Michigan	1	2016	23	257	85	50	10	
Jason Perkins^	United States	F	De La Salle	6	2017–present	168	5,283	2,310	1,164	309	
Eugene Phelps^{+}	United States	F	Long Beach State	4	2016–2019	42	1,747	1,303	771	177	
Kevinn Pinkney^{+}	United States	F/C	Nevada	1	2016	9	332	211	117	19	
Kris Porter	Philippines	F/C	Ateneo	2	2022, 2022	13	120	22	7	5	
Davon Potts	United States	G	San Beda	1	2019	7	63	14	3	6	
Tzaddy Rangel	Philippines	C	National-U	1	2023	1	1	0	0	0	
LA Revilla	Philippines	G	De La Salle	2	2017–2019	54	1,075	234	160	179	
Jay-R Reyes	Philippines	F/C	Philippines	1	2020	8	73	12	10	5	
Jansen Rios	Philippines	G/F	Adamson	3	2020–2022	63	600	151	73	33	
Ricci Rivero^	Philippines	G/F	Philippines	1	2023–present	28	405	213	49	31	
Billy Robles	Philippines	G/F	NISU	2	2022, 2022	17	146	44	34	7	
Kent Salado^	Philippines	G	Arellano	1	2024–present	8	191	63	35	32	
Nico Salva	Philippines	F	Ateneo	1	2022	1	5	0	0	0	
Encho Serrano	Philippines	G	De La Salle	1	2022–2023	34	603	351	125	64	
Marcus Simmons^{+}	United States	G	USC	1	2016	3	114	56	33	12	
Paul Sorongon	Philippines	G	Philippines	1	2016	3	8	2	1	0	
Raul Soyud^	Philippines	C	Philippines	2	2023–present	26	191	50	57	8	
Dominique Sutton^{+}	United States	F	North Carolina Central	1	2022	4	141	65	39	8	
Alfrancis Tamsi	Philippines	G	Far Eastern	1	2021	6	30	0	2	0	
Tyler Tio^	Philippines	G	Ateneo	2	2022–present	54	1,543	600	117	143	
Norbert Torres	Canada	F/C	De La Salle	2	2016–2017	36	508	143	138	14	
Kenneth Tuffin^	New Zealand	F	Far Eastern	1	2023–present	28	860	299	141	51	
Josh Urbiztondo	United States	G	Fresno Pacific	1	2016	20	370	157	39	46	
Raffy Verano^	United States	G/F	Ateneo	1	2023–present	27	234	58	48	8	
Jeff Viernes	Philippines	G	St. Clare	1	2017	3	19	8	0	3	
Kaleb Wesson^{+}	United States	F/C	Ohio State	1	2023	13	523	240	220	58	
James White^{+}	United States	F/C	Georgia Tech	1	2018	4	139	101	53	9	
Johnathan Williams^{+}	United States	C	Gonzaga	1	2023–2024	17	766	416	278	89	
John Wilson	Philippines	G	José Rizal	2	2016–2017	40	431	175	76	14	
Willy Wilson	United States	F	De La Salle	4	2016–2019	98	2,023	508	459	138	
Matthew Wright	Canada	G/F	St. Bonaventure	6	2016–2022	148	5,080	2,642	741	720	
