= 2020 PBA Philippine Cup =

Conference of the 2020 PBA season

- Duration: March 8–11, 2020 (before first suspension); October 11–29, 2020 (first resumption, second suspension); November 3 – December 9, 2020 (second resumption)
- TV partner(s): Local: One Sports; TV5; PBA Rush (HD); International: AksyonTV International

Finals
- Champions: Barangay Ginebra San Miguel
- Runners-up: TNT Tropang Giga

Awards
- Best Player: Stanley Pringle (Barangay Ginebra San Miguel)
- Finals MVP: LA Tenorio (Barangay Ginebra San Miguel)

PBA Philippine Cup chronology
- < 2019 2021 >

PBA conference chronology
- < 2019 Governors' 2021 Philippine >

The 2020 Philippine Cup, also known as the 2020 Honda PBA Philippine Cup for sponsorship reasons, is the only conference or tournament of the 2020 PBA season of the Philippine Basketball Association (PBA). The 42nd PBA Philippine Cup started on March 8 and ended on December 9, 2020. The tournament does not allow teams to hire foreign players or imports.

Three days later, the PBA board of governors decided to indefinitely postpone the tournament, together with the PBA D-League Aspirants' Cup, and the launching of the PBA 3x3 league, due to the COVID-19 pandemic in the country and the enforcement of the various quarantine restrictions throughout the country.

During their meeting on September 17, the PBA Board of Governors decided to resume the tournament and create the "PBA bubble" (similar to the successful NBA bubble) within the Clark area in Pampanga. The games were played at the Angeles University Foundation Sports and Cultural Center while the players stayed at the Quest Hotel inside Clark. On September 24, the Inter-Agency Task Force for the Management of Emerging Infectious Diseases (IATF-EID) gave the league a provisional approval to have scrimmages and five-on-five games. The 12 PBA teams arrived in Clark by batches on September 28 and 29, 2020.

On October 6, the league published its complete eliminations schedule. The elimination round games of the Philippine Cup resumed in the "PBA bubble" on October 11 and played daily with two games scheduled per day.

The tournament was temporarily postponed between October 30 to November 2 after a Blackwater Elite player and one of the league's referees tested positive for COVID-19.

After new protocols have been added, the games resumed starting November 3. In order for the league to finish the elimination round by November 11, two to four games were scheduled per day. This was the first time that the PBA had a quadruple-header game day and an official game scheduled in the morning.

== Format ==
The following format will be observed for the duration of the conference. Two of the quarterfinals match-ups were originally be a best-of-three series, and the semifinals be a best-of-seven series but was revised to all quarterfinal match-ups be in a twice-to-beat format, and the semifinals be in a best-of-five series during the planning for the "PBA bubble":

- Single-round robin eliminations; 11 games per team; Teams are then seeded by basis on win–loss records.
- Top eight teams will advance to the quarterfinals. In case of tie, playoff games will be held only for the #8 seed.
- Quarterfinals (top 4 seeds twice-to-beat):
  - QF1: #1 vs #8
  - QF2: #2 vs #7
  - QF3: #3 vs #6
  - QF4: #4 vs #5
- Semifinals (best-of-5 series):
  - SF1: QF1 Winner vs. QF4 Winner
  - SF2: QF2 Winner vs. QF3 Winner
- Finals (best-of-7 series)
  - F1: SF1 Winner vs SF2 Winner

== Elimination round ==
=== Team standings ===
Pos	Team	W	L	PCT	GB	Qualification
1	Barangay Ginebra San Miguel	8	3	.727 (Note: Head-to-head record: Barangay Ginebra 1–0 Phoenix)	—	Twice-to-beat in quarterfinals
2	Phoenix Super LPG Fuel Masters	8	3	.727	—	Twice-to-beat in quarterfinals
3	TNT Tropang Giga	7	4	.636 (Note: Head-to-head quotient: TNT 1.074, San Miguel 1.023, Meralco 0.992, Alaska 0.959, Magnolia 0.955)	1	Twice-to-beat in quarterfinals
4	San Miguel Beermen	7	4	.636	1	Twice-to-beat in quarterfinals
5	Meralco Bolts	7	4	.636	1	Twice-to-win in quarterfinals
6	Alaska Aces	7	4	.636	1	Twice-to-win in quarterfinals
7	Magnolia Hotshots Pambansang Manok	7	4	.636	1	Twice-to-win in quarterfinals
8	Rain or Shine Elasto Painters	6	5	.545	2	Twice-to-win in quarterfinals
9	NLEX Road Warriors	5	6	.455	3	
10	Blackwater Elite	2	9	.182	6	
11	NorthPort Batang Pier	1	10	.091 (Note: Head-to-head record: NorthPort 1–0 Terrafirma)	7	
12	Terrafirma Dyip	1	10	.091	7	

Source: PBA.ph
Rules for classification: 1) winning percentage; 2) if two teams are tied, head to head record; if three or more teams are tied, head-to-head goal average (quotient), if tied for 8th, one-game playoff; 3) overall quotient 4) coin toss

=== Schedule ===
Team ╲ Game	1	2	3	4	5	6	7	8	9	10	11
Alaska	TNT	MER	MAG	BWE	ROS	SMB	TER	PHX	BGSM	NP	NLEX
Barangay Ginebra	NLEX	BWE	MER	PHX	MAG	ROS	ALA	NP	TNT	SMB	TER
Blackwater	NP	BGSM	NLEX	ALA	TNT	SMB	MER	TER	ROS	PHX	MAG
Magnolia	SMB	NLEX	ALA	MER	PHX	BGSM	TNT	TER	ROS	NP	BWE
Meralco	PHX	ALA	BGSM	MAG	NLEX	SMB	BWE	ROS	TNT	TER	NP
NLEX	BGSM	MAG	BWE	NP	MER	PHX	TNT	ROS	SMB	ALA	TER
NorthPort	BWE	PHX	ROS	NLEX	TER	TNT	BGSM	ALA	MAG	SMB	MER
Phoenix Super LPG	MER	NP	TNT	BGSM	MAG	NLEX	ALA	TER	SMB	BWE	ROS
Rain or Shine	SMB	TER	NP	ALA	BGSM	NLEX	MER	MAG	BWE	TNT	PHX
San Miguel	MAG	ROS	TNT	TER	ALA	MER	BWE	PHX	NLEX	BGSM	NP
Terrafirma	TNT	ROS	SMB	NP	ALA	PHX	MAG	BWE	MER	BGSM	NLEX
TNT	ALA	TER	SMB	PHX	BWE	NLEX	NP	MAG	BGSM	MER	ROS

Source: PBA.ph
= Win; = OT win; = Loss; = OT loss

=== Results ===
Teams	ALA	BGSM	BWE	MAG	MER	NLEX	NP	PHX	ROS	SMB	TER	TNT
Alaska	—	81–87	120–82	87–81	81–93	122–119*	102–94	105–97	89–88	88–92	99–96	95–100
Barangay Ginebra		—	103–99	92–102	105–91	102–92	112–100	86–71	82–85*	66–81	102–80	85–79
Blackwater			—	80–95	85–89	98–88	96–89	95–100	71–82	88–90*	101–110	96–109
Magnolia				—	104–109*	103–100	83–76	84–91	70–62	78–94	103–89	102–92
Meralco					—	101–92	80–73	98–116	85–78	82–89	95–93	79–92
NLEX						—	102–88	110–114	94–74	124–90	127–101	109–98
NorthPort							—	105–110	68–70	99–120	107–96	87–112
Phoenix Super LPG								—	90–88	110–103	116–94	91–110
Rain or Shine									—	87–83	91–82	80–74
San Miguel										—	105–98	88–107
Terrafirma											—	101–112
TNT												—

Source: PBA.ph results, PBA.ph schedule
Legend: Blue = left column team win; Red = top row team win.
Matches with lighter background shading were decided after overtime.

== Bracket ==
Quarterfinals (Top 4 twice-to-beat)
1	Barangay Ginebra	81
8	Rain or Shine	73
4	San Miguel	71	68
5	Meralco	78	90
2	Phoenix Super LPG	89
7	Magnolia	88
3	TNT	104
6	Alaska	83

Semifinals (Best-of-5)
1	Barangay Ginebra	3
5	Meralco	2
2	Phoenix Super LPG	2
3	TNT	3

Finals (Best-of-7)
1	Barangay Ginebra	4
3	TNT	1

== Quarterfinals ==
=== (1) Barangay Ginebra vs. (8) Rain or Shine ===
TV5

November 13
6:45 pm

Box score

Barangay Ginebra San Miguel 81, Rain or Shine Elasto Painters 73
Scoring by quarter: 20–22, 20–15, 19–18, 22–18
Pts: J. Aguilar 23; Rebs: J. Aguilar 11; Asts: Tenorio 8	Pts: Borboran 13; Rebs: Belga 8 Asts: Nambatac 5
Barangay Ginebra wins series in one game

AUF Sports Arena & Cultural Center, Angeles City
Referees: P. Balao, R. Gruta, B. Oliva, M. Flordeliza

=== (2) Phoenix Super LPG vs. (7) Magnolia ===
One Sports

November 14
6:45 pm

Box score

Phoenix Super LPG Fuel Masters 89, Magnolia Hotshots Pambansang Manok 88
Scoring by quarter: 24–21, 13–18, 29–24, 23–25
Pts: Wright 32; Rebs: Abueva 8 Asts: Wright 9	Pts: Lee 17; Rebs: Sangalang 11; Asts: Lee 6
Phoenix Super LPG wins series in one game

AUF Sports Arena & Cultural Center, Angeles City
Referees: J. Mariano, M. Flordeliza, J. Narandan, M. Orioste

=== (3) TNT vs. (6) Alaska ===
One Sports

November 14
4:00 pm

Box score

TNT Tropang Giga 104, Alaska Aces 83
Scoring by quarter: 28–23, 23–28, 33–15, 20–17
Pts: Pogoy 34; Rebs: Erram 11; Asts: Castro, Parks 5	Pts: Teng 13; Rebs: Manuel, Teng 7 Asts: Teng 6
TNT wins series in one game

AUF Sports Arena & Cultural Center, Angeles City
Referees: N. Quilinguen, R. Yante, M. Montoya, J. Nicandro

=== (4) San Miguel vs. (5) Meralco ===
TV5

November 13
4:00 pm

Box score

San Miguel Beermen 71, Meralco Bolts 78
Scoring by quarter: 11–21, 20–19, 20–19, 20–19
Pts: Tautuaa 14; Rebs: Tautuaa 11; Asts: Ross 7	Pts: Hugnatan 16; Rebs: Quinto 13; Asts: Newsome 9

AUF Sports Arena & Cultural Center, Angeles City
Referees: N. Quilinguen, R. Yante, J. Narandan, J. Tantay

TV5

November 15
6:45 pm

Box score

San Miguel Beermen 68, Meralco Bolts 90
Scoring by quarter: 11–21, 20–22, 19–32, 18–15
Pts: Lassiter, Tautuaa 20; Rebs: Tautuaa 11; Asts: Ross 6	Pts: Amer, Hodge 14; Rebs: Hugnatan 8 Asts: Newsome 5
Meralco wins series in two games

AUF Sports Arena & Cultural Center, Angeles City
Referees: P. Balao, R. Gruta, B. Oliva, M. Flordeliza

== Semifinals ==
=== (1) Barangay Ginebra vs. (5) Meralco ===
TV5

November 18
6:30 pm

Box score

Barangay Ginebra San Miguel 96, Meralco Bolts 79
Scoring by quarter: 21–17, 27–19, 23–18, 25–25
Pts: Pringle 19; Rebs: Thompson 9 Asts: Thompson 8	Pts: Maliksi 24; Rebs: Hugnatan 5 Asts: Newsome 4

AUF Sports Arena & Cultural Center, Angeles City
Referees: N. Quilinguen, J. Mariano, M. Montoya, M. Orioste

TV5

November 20
3:45 pm

Box score

Barangay Ginebra San Miguel 77, Meralco Bolts 95
Scoring by quarter: 27–23, 23–19, 11–23, 16–30
Pts: J. Aguilar 17; Rebs: Thompson 9 Asts: Thompson 5	Pts: Newsome 16; Rebs: Almazan, Hodge 11; Asts: Newsome 6

AUF Sports Arena & Cultural Center, Angeles City
Referees: P. Balao, R. Gruta, B. Oliva, J. Baldago

TV5

November 22
6:30 pm

Box score

Barangay Ginebra San Miguel 91, Meralco Bolts 84
Scoring by quarter: 27–12, 18–22, 19–18, 27–32
Pts: Pringle 24; Rebs: J. Aguilar 13; Asts: Pringle 6	Pts: Maliksi 23; Rebs: Almazan 9 Asts: Hodge, Newsome 6

AUF Sports Arena & Cultural Center, Angeles City
Referees: J. Mariano, R. Yante, J. Narandan, J. Nicandro

TV5

November 25
3:45 pm

Box score

Barangay Ginebra San Miguel 80, Meralco Bolts 83
Scoring by quarter: 21–26, 10–18, 33–16, 16–23
Pts: Pringle 18; Rebs: J. Aguilar 12; Asts: Pringle 6	Pts: Hugnatan 19; Rebs: Newsome 11; Asts: Newsome 5

AUF Sports Arena & Cultural Center, Angeles City
Referees: N. Quilinguen, R. Gruta, M. Montoya, J. Baldago

TV5

November 27
6:30 pm

Box score

Barangay Ginebra San Miguel 83, Meralco Bolts 80
Scoring by quarter: 17–14, 16–17, 22–28, 28–21
Pts: Pringle 22; Rebs: Thompson 12; Asts: Thompson 7	Pts: Newsome 15; Rebs: Hodge 7 Asts: Newsome 6
Barangay Ginebra wins series, 3–2

AUF Sports Arena & Cultural Center, Angeles City
Referees: J. Mariano, M. Flordeliza, J. Narandan, M. Orioste

=== (2) Phoenix Super LPG vs. (3) TNT ===
TV5

November 18
3:45 pm

Box score

Phoenix Super LPG Fuel Masters 92, TNT Tropang Giga 95
Scoring by quarter: 24–16, 13–20, 24–31, 31–28
Pts: Jazul 21; Rebs: Chua 13; Asts: Heruela 5	Pts: Castro 20; Rebs: Erram 14; Asts: Castro 6

AUF Sports Arena & Cultural Center, Angeles City
Referees: P. Balao, R. Yante, R. Gruta, M. Flordeliza

TV5

November 20
6:30 pm

Box score

Phoenix Super LPG Fuel Masters 110, TNT Tropang Giga 103
Scoring by quarter: 28–27, 32–18, 26–35, 24–23
Pts: Perkins 21; Rebs: Abueva 15; Asts: Abueva 4	Pts: Parks 41; Rebs: Rosario 14; Asts: Pogoy 4

AUF Sports Arena & Cultural Center, Angeles City
Referees: N. Quilinguen, J. Mariano, J. Narandan, J. Nicandro

TV5

November 22
3:45 pm

Box score

Phoenix Super LPG Fuel Masters 92, TNT Tropang Giga 89
Scoring by quarter: 22–24, 27–23, 24–22, 19–20
Pts: Wright 25; Rebs: Abueva 14; Asts: Abueva 6	Pts: Parks 19; Rebs: Erram, Parks 13; Asts: Parks 6

AUF Sports Arena & Cultural Center, Angeles City
Referees: P. Balao, R. Gruta, J. Narandan, J. Baldago

TV5

November 25
6:30 pm

Box score

Phoenix Super LPG Fuel Masters 101, TNT Tropang Giga 102
Scoring by quarter: 12–21, 26–27, 30–21, 33–33
Pts: Wright 34; Rebs: Abueva 13; Asts: Wright 9	Pts: Parks 36; Rebs: Rosario 7 Asts: Castro 5

AUF Sports Arena & Cultural Center, Angeles City
Referees: J. Mariano, R. Yante, M. Orioste, J. Narandan

TV5

November 27
3:45 pm

Box score

Phoenix Super LPG Fuel Masters 81, TNT Tropang Giga 91
Scoring by quarter: 20–25, 14–15, 19–22, 28–29
Pts: Abueva 23; Rebs: Abueva 13; Asts: Abueva 6	Pts: Parks 26; Rebs: Parks 10; Asts: Castro, Parks 6
TNT wins series, 3–2

AUF Sports Arena & Cultural Center, Angeles City
Referees: R. Yante, R. Gruta, M. Montoya, J. Baldago

== Finals ==
TV5

November 29
6:00 pm

Box score

Barangay Ginebra San Miguel 100, TNT Tropang Giga 94 (OT)

AUF Sports Arena & Cultural Center, Angeles City

TV5

December 2
6:00 pm

Box score

Barangay Ginebra San Miguel 92, TNT Tropang Giga 90

AUF Sports Arena & Cultural Center, Angeles City

TV5

December 4
6:00 pm

Box score

Barangay Ginebra San Miguel 67, TNT Tropang Giga 88

AUF Sports Arena & Cultural Center, Angeles City

TV5

December 6
6:00 pm

Box score

Barangay Ginebra San Miguel 98, TNT Tropang Giga 88

AUF Sports Arena & Cultural Center, Angeles City

TV5

December 9
6:00 pm

Box score

Barangay Ginebra San Miguel 82, TNT Tropang Giga 78
Barangay Ginebra wins series, 4–1

AUF Sports Arena & Cultural Center, Angeles City

== Awards ==
=== Players of the Week ===
Week	Player	Ref.
October 11–18	Roger Pogoy (TNT Tropang Giga)	
October 19–25	Chris Newsome (Meralco Bolts)	
October 26 – November 1	Vic Manuel (Alaska Aces); Beau Belga (Rain or Shine Elasto Painters)	
November 3–8	Paul Lee (Magnolia Hotshots Pambansang Manok)	
November 9–15	Matthew Wright (Phoenix Super LPG Fuel Masters)	
November 16–22	Calvin Abueva (Phoenix Super LPG Fuel Masters)	

=== Rookies of the Week ===
Week	Player	Ref.
October 11–18	Adrian Wong (Rain or Shine Elasto Painters)	
October 19–25	Barkley Eboña (Alaska Aces)	
October 26 – November 1	Mike Ayonayon (NLEX Road Warriors)	
November 3–8	Aaron Black (Meralco Bolts)	
November 9–15	Aaron Black (Meralco Bolts)	
November 16–22	Arvin Tolentino (Barangay Ginebra San Miguel)	

== Statistics ==
=== Individual statistical leaders ===
Category	Player	Team	Statistic
Points per game	CJ Perez	Terrafirma Dyip	24.4
Rebounds per game	Christian Standhardinger	NorthPort Batang Pier	12.0
Assists per game	Scottie Thompson	Barangay Ginebra San Miguel	5.8
Steals per game	Mark Barroca	Magnolia Hotshots Pambansang Manok	2.3
Blocks per game	Justin Chua	Phoenix Super LPG Fuel Masters	1.6
Turnovers per game	Calvin Abueva	Phoenix Super LPG Fuel Masters	3.8
Fouls per game	Jason Perkins	Phoenix Super LPG Fuel Masters	4.1
Minutes per game	Bobby Ray Parks Jr.	TNT Tropang Giga	39.7
FG%	Raul Soyud	NLEX Road Warriors	73.8%
FT%	Marcio Lassiter	San Miguel Beermen	92.6%
3FG%	Aris Dionisio	Magnolia Hotshots Pambansang Manok	50.0%
Double-doubles	John Paul Erram	TNT Tropang Giga	11
Triple-doubles	Sean Anthony	NorthPort Batang Pier	1
Triple-doubles	Calvin Abueva	Phoenix Super LPG Fuel Masters	1

=== Individual game highs ===
Category	Player	Team	Statistic
Points	Roger Pogoy	TNT Tropang Giga	45
Rebounds	Justin Chua	Phoenix Super LPG Fuel Masters	17
Rebounds	Christian Standhardinger	NorthPort Batang Pier	17
Rebounds	Jervy Cruz	NorthPort Batang Pier	17
Assists	Jayson Castro	TNT Tropang Giga	11
Steals	Gabe Norwood	Rain or Shine Elasto Painters	6
Steals	Chris Newsome	Meralco Bolts	6
Steals	Roger Pogoy	TNT Tropang Giga	6
Blocks	Justin Chua	Phoenix Super LPG Fuel Masters	5
Three point field goals	Roger Pogoy	TNT Tropang Giga	10
Three point field goals	Bobby Ray Parks Jr.	TNT Tropang Giga	10

=== Team statistical leaders ===
Category	Team	Statistic
Points per game	NLEX Road Warriors	105.2
Rebounds per game	NLEX Road Warriors	46.5
Assists per game	Phoenix Super LPG Fuel Masters	23.4
Steals per game	TNT Tropang Giga	9.1
Blocks per game	Rain or Shine Elasto Painters	4.6
Turnovers per game	Phoenix Super LPG Fuel Masters	17.4
FG%	NLEX Road Warriors	45.3%
FT%	NLEX Road Warriors	75.3%
3FG%	Magnolia Hotshots Pambansang Manok	35.4%

== Final ranking ==
Pos	Team	Pld	W	L	Final result
1	Barangay Ginebra San Miguel	22	16	6	Champions
2	TNT Tropang Giga	22	12	10	Runner-up
3	Phoenix Super LPG Fuel Masters	17	11	6	Semifinalist
4	Meralco Bolts	18	11	7	Semifinalist
5	San Miguel Beermen	13	7	6	Quarterfinalist
6	Alaska Aces	12	7	5	Quarterfinalist
7	Magnolia Hotshots Pambansang Manok	12	7	5	Quarterfinalist
8	Rain or Shine Elasto Painters	12	6	6	Quarterfinalist
9	NLEX Road Warriors	11	5	6	Elimination round
10	Blackwater Elite	11	2	9	Elimination round
11	NorthPort Batang Pier	11	1	10	Elimination round
12	Terrafirma Dyip	11	1	10	Elimination round

Source: PBA.ph
Rules for classification: 1) Playoff round eliminated; 2) Elimination round ranking

== See also ==
- COVID-19 pandemic in the Philippines
- Impact of the COVID-19 pandemic on sports
