= Maurice Shaw =

Filipino-American basketball player and boxer

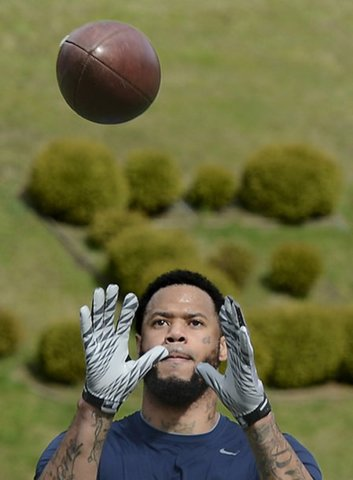

Personal information
- Born: January 8, 1985 (age 41) Biñan, Laguna, Philippines
- Listed height: 6 ft 9 in (2.06 m)
- Listed weight: 260 lb (118 kg)

Career information
- High school: Washington Union (Fresno, California); Lincoln (Tacoma, Washington); Bridgton Academy (Bridgton, Maine)
- College: Hutchinson CC (2004–2005)
- NBA draft: 2006: undrafted
- PBA draft: 2019: 1st round2nd overall (Note: The 2019 draft was composed of two drafts: the Gilas special draft, which consists of 5 players reserved for the Gilas Pilipinas program, and the regular draft. Go was selected as the first pick in the Gilas special draft. Shaw was selected as the first pick of the regular draft.)
- Drafted by: Blackwater Elite
- Playing career: 2005–2022
- Position: Center

Career history
- 2005–2006: Harlem Globetrotters
- 2006–2007: Associação Académica de Coimbra
- 2007–2008: Minot SkyRockets
- 2016: Dunkin' Raptors
- 2016–2017: Kabayan Pilipinas Basketball Club
- 2017: Power Electricity Authority
- 2020: Blackwater Elite
- 2022: Manila City Stars
- 2022: Mekong United
- 2022: Makabayan Warriors

Maurice James Escovilla Shaw (born January 8, 1985) is a Filipino-American former professional basketball player and professional boxer since July 2024. In Shaw's early years, he attended Washington Union High School in Fresno County, California. After high school, he began his professional career playing for the world famous Harlem Globetrotters, while attending Hutchinson Community College simultaneously.

== High school ==
Shaw began his high school career at Washington Union High School in Fresno County, California playing alongside Deshawn Stevenson. During his freshman year, he was ranked as one of the top 5 centers on the West Coast, and by the end of the year, was ranked among the best freshman basketball players in the country. During his sophomore year, the Sporting News magazine honored Shaw as one of top 20 players in the country, alongside LeBron James.

In 2002, Shaw attended the Nike All-American camp. He later transferred to Bridgton Academy prep school in North Bridgton, Maine where he averaged 20 points and 11 rebounds. During his time at Bridgton, Shaw participated in the Pittsburgh World Classic and played on the USA team. After prep school, he entered the 2004 draft where he worked out with the Seattle SuperSonics, and later withdrew. Shaw then played for Hutchinson college for a brief period before joining the Harlem Globetrotters.

== Professional basketball career ==
=== Harlem Globetrotters and early career ===
Shaw's professional career began in 2005 with the Harlem Globetrotters. During his season with the Globetrotters, he appeared in the Harlem Globetrotters World Tour Nintendo DS game. Following his 2005–2006 season with the Globetrotters, Shaw went on to play for Associação Académica de Coimbra in Portugal where he led his team to the playoffs after a losing season. After playing internationally, Shaw returned to the United States and played for the Minot SkyRockets in the CBA during the 2008–2009 season. The following year, Shaw played for the Tacoma Tide in the IBL and also played for the Seattle Mountaineers in 2010.

=== Hiatus from basketball and NFL career ===
After a three-year absence, Shaw resurfaced and made national headlines for participating in the 2013 NFL regional combine at the Seattle Seahawks headquarters by running a 4.81 in 40 yard dash. Shaw later worked with the Oakland Raiders during OTA's where he had a meeting with the staff and tight end coach Mark Hutson.

=== Return to basketball ===
In 2016, Shaw made his return to basketball as the starting forward for the Dunkin' Raptors in the Thailand Basketball League. Shaw suffered a groin injury early in the season but managed to return and average a double-double for the remainder of the season.

Shaw stayed in Thailand, and played for Filipino club Kabayan, norming 17.2 points, 11.3 rebounds, and a 44.7 FG% rate per game. Shaw finished the second half of the season with PEA, where he tallied 22.6 points, 14.6 rebounds, and 48.2 FG% per game.

==== PBA career ====
Shaw, who has Filipino heritage through his mother, declared for the 2019 PBA draft, where he was the tallest and one of the oldest members of the draft class. Shaw was eventually picked second overall by the Blackwater Elite in the regular draft of the 2019 draft. After the 2020 season, Maurice Shaw was traded to the NLEX Road Warriors, but he never played a game for the team.

In 2021, after a buyout with the NLEX Road Warriors, Shaw signed a contract with the Barangay Ginebra San Miguel for the remainder of the 2021 PBA Governors' Cup. On March 15, 2022, he was placed in the unrestricted free agent list, without appearing a game for the team.

ASL and Filbasket career

Shortly after the 2021–22 PBA season, Shaw joined Mekong United, a Vietnam-based team playing in the ASEAN Super League (ASL).

Following his stint in the ASEAN Super League, Shaw played for the Makabayan Warriors, in the 2022 FilBasket International Championship held in Malaysia, averaging 9.5 points per game and 9.5 rebounds.

== Career statistics ==
High School statistics

Legend
GP	Games played	GS	Games started	MPG	Minutes per game
FG%	Field goal percentage	3P%	3-point field goal percentage	FT%	Free throw percentage
RPG	Rebounds per game	APG	Assists per game	SPG	Steals per game
BPG	Blocks per game	PPG	Points per game	**Bold**	Career high

Year	Team	GP	GS	MPG	FG%	3P%	FT%	RPG	APG	SPG	BPG	PPG
1999–00	Washington Union	32	19	N/A	N/A	N/A	N/A	5.0	N/A	N/A	N/A	10.0
2000–01	Washington Union	2	2	N/A	N/A	N/A	N/A	11.0	N/A	N/A	N/A	23.0
2002–03	Lincoln	25	25	N/A	N/A	N/A	N/A	10.0	3.0	N/A	2.5	15.0
2003–04	Bridgton Academy	34	34	N/A	N/A	N/A	N/A	11.0	2.3	N/A	3.3	20.2

College statistics

Legend
GP	Games played	GS	Games started	MPG	Minutes per game
FG%	Field goal percentage	3P%	3-point field goal percentage	FT%	Free throw percentage
RPG	Rebounds per game	APG	Assists per game	SPG	Steals per game
BPG	Blocks per game	PPG	Points per game	**Bold**	Career high

Year	Team	GP	GS	MPG	FG%	3P%	FT%	RPG	APG	SPG	BPG	PPG
2004	Hutchinson	12	N/A	N/A	46.7	N/A	50.0	2.8	0.3	0.3	N/A	5.3

TBL statistics

Legend
GP	Games played	GS	Games started	MPG	Minutes per game
FG%	Field goal percentage	3P%	3-point field goal percentage	FT%	Free throw percentage
RPG	Rebounds per game	APG	Assists per game	SPG	Steals per game
BPG	Blocks per game	PPG	Points per game	**Bold**	Career high

Year	Team	GP	GS	MPG	FG%	3P%	FT%	RPG	APG	SPG	BPG	PPG
2016	Dunkin' Raptors	11	N/A	N/A	N/A	N/A	N/A	9.3	N/A	N/A	N/A	13.8
2016–2017	Kabayan Pilipinas	10	10	37.3	N/A	N/A	N/A	11.5	1.8	N/A	N/A	17.8
2017	Power Electricity Authority (PEA)	20	20	37.2	N/A	N/A	N/A	15.3	1.8	N/A	N/A	23

PBA statistics

Legend
GP	Games played	MPG	Minutes per game
FG%	Field-goal percentage	3P%	3-point field-goal percentage	FT%	Free-throw percentage
RPG	Rebounds per game	APG	Assists per game	SPG	Steals per game
BPG	Blocks per game	PPG	Points per game	**Bold**	Career high

Year	Team	GP	MPG	FG%	3P%	FT%	RPG	APG	SPG	BPG	PPG
2020	Blackwater	3	7.5	.200	.000	.000	.7	.0	.0	.0	.7

== Professional boxing career ==
On July 21, 2024, Shaw turned into a professional boxer, where he represents the Philippines, making him the only active Filipino heavyweight boxer, the other Filipino professional heavyweight boxers in history mostly fought in the 1930s except for the most previous Filipino heavyweight boxer Denis De la Cruz who fought only once on May 9, 2009, in Germany. Shaw won his professional boxing debut, stopping 0–4 Mexican Adrian Diaz in Evolution Club, Tijuana in the first round. In February 2022, Shaw would lose his first bout against journeyman Jesús Othon via UD, he would rebound on June 21, 2025, stopping Luis Rodriguez Aguilar in the second round.

== Professional boxing record ==
10 fights	9 wins	1 loss
By knockout	9	0
By decision	0	1

No.	Result	Record	Opponent	Type	Round, time	Date	Location	Notes
10	Win	9–1	Naphat Ngoenbamrung	TKO	4 (10), 1:57	Nov 17, 2026	Pasay, Philippines	Won OPBF heavyweight title
9	Win	8–1	Juan Medina Gress	TKO	2 (4)	May 29, 2026	Veracruz, Veracruz, Mexico	
8	Win	7–1	Jorge Luis Aquino	TKO		Apr 2026	Veracruz, Veracruz, Mexico	
7	Win	6–1	Jovani Sanchez Lopez	TKO	4 (8), 2:43	Feb 7, 2026	Tijuana, Baja California, Mexico	
6	Win	5–1	Israel Acevedo	TKO		Oct 2025	Rosarito, Baja California, Mexico	
5	Win	4–1	Victor Rivera	TKO		Aug 2025	Rosarito, Baja California, Mexico	
4	Win	3–1	Luis Rodríguez Aguilar	TKO	2 (4), 0:10	Jun 21, 2025	Rosarito, Baja California, Mexico	
3	Loss	2–1	Jesús Othon	UD	4	Feb 22, 2025	Rosarito, Baja California, Mexico	
2	Win	2–0	Victor Aceves	TKO	1 (4), 1:25	Sep 22, 2024	Evolution Club, Tijuana, Mexico	
1	Win	1–0	Adrián Díaz	TKO	1 (4), 2:03	Jul 21, 2024	Evolution Club, Tijuana, Mexico	
