= Arvin Tolentino =

Filipino basketball player (born 1995)

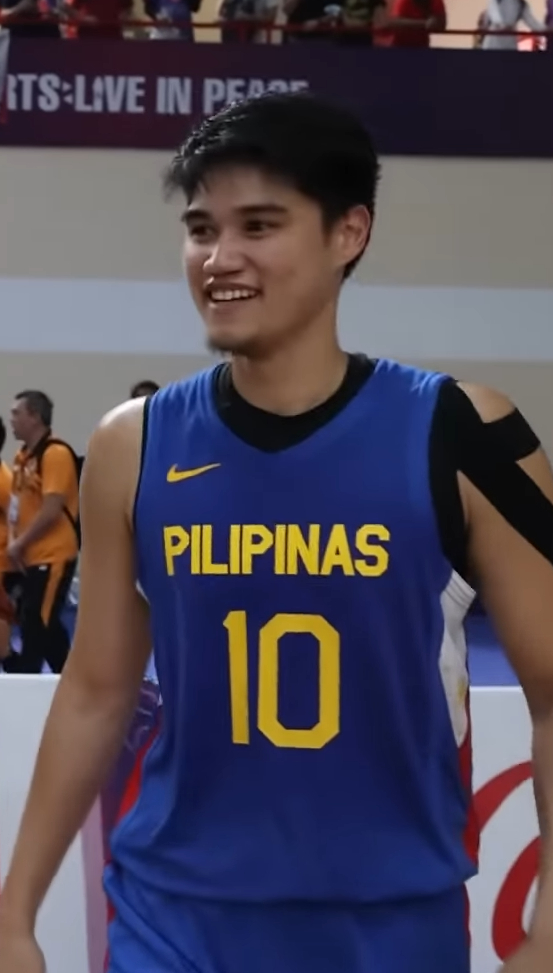
- Tolentino in 2023

No. 25 – Seoul SK Knights
- Position: Small forward / Power forward
- League: KBL

Personal information
- Born: November 5, 1995 (age 31) Angono, Rizal, Philippines
- Listed height: 6 ft 5 in (1.96 m)
- Listed weight: 210 lb (95 kg)

Career information
- High school: San Beda (Taytay, Rizal)
- College: Ateneo (2014–2015); FEU (2017–2018)
- PBA draft: 2019: 1st round, 10th overall pick
- Drafted by: Barangay Ginebra San Miguel
- Playing career: 2019–present
- Coaching career: 2025–present

Career history

Playing
- 2019: Batangas City Athletics
- 2020–2022: Barangay Ginebra San Miguel
- 2022–2025: NorthPort Batang Pier
- 2025–present: Seoul SK Knights

Coaching
- 2025: PSP Gymers (assistant)

Career highlights
- 2× PBA champion (2020 Philippine, 2021 Governors'); PBA Best Player of the Conference (2024–25 Commissioner's); 2× PBA All-Star (2023, 2024); 2× PBA First Mythical Team (2024, 2025); PBA Second Mythical Team (2023); PBA All-Rookie Team (2020); PBA scoring champion (2025); UAAP Rookie of the Year (2014)
Medals
Men's basketball
Representing Philippines
Asian Games
| Gold medal – first place | 2022 Hangzhou | Team |
SEA Games
| Gold medal – first place | 2023 Phnom Penh | Team |

Arvin Dave de Leon Tolentino (born November 5, 1995) is a Filipino professional basketball player for the Seoul SK Knights of the Korean Basketball League (KBL).

He also served as an assistant coach for the PSP Gymers of the Women's Maharlika Pilipinas Basketball League (WMPBL).

== Early life ==
Tolentino grew up in Angono, Rizal. He first started playing basketball at 12 years old. He was trained by a friend of his father.

Throughout high school, he played for the Red Cubs of the San Beda University. In his time there, San Beda won the championship 5 straight times. He was on the NCAA Mythical Team and a Finals MVP.

Tolentino played in the 2013 SEAOIL NBTC Games, which showcases many players from various high schools around the country, and won Finals MVP. He also participated in the Adidas Nations Global 2013 and Slam Rising Stars Classic.

Tolentino received offers to play college varsity basketball from top Philippine universities such as Ateneo de Manila, De La Salle, National University, as well as his own alma mater, San Beda University. He also received offers from American universities Duke and Rhode Island. He committed to play college basketball to the Blue Eagles of the Ateneo de Manila University.

== College career ==
=== Ateneo Blue Eagles (2014–2015) ===
Tolentino debuted against the Adamson Soaring Falcons with 12 points. Against La Salle he had 14 points, 10 rebounds, and 2 blocks. In their match against the UP Fighting Maroons, he had 20 points and 8 rebounds. For these performances, he was given the nickname "A-Train". He finished the season as the Season 77 Rookie of the Year.

He didn't have a good start in Season 78, as he had to adjust to playing center, and started losing minutes. He averaged just 3 points in their first six games. He broke through that season in their game against the UST Growling Tigers, scoring 16 of his 20 points in the second half to give Ateneo the win. Their season was ended when Mac Belo hit a buzzer-beating shot in their semifinals series.

He failed to make Ateneo's grade requirements for the following season, so he was dropped by Ateneo.

=== FEU Tamaraws ===
Tolentino transferred to FEU in time for Season 80, after Ateneo dropped him. In his first match against his former team, he scored 11 points, but Ateneo took the win. He had a career-high 23 points in their win against NU. He was suspended for one game after getting two unsportsmanlike fouls in his previous game. They made it to the Final Four where he faced his former team. He had 13 points as his team won Game 1. In Game 2, he had a turnover that allowed Ateneo to win the game in overtime.

The next season, Season 81, he switched his jersey number from #13 to #41. He was ejected from their game against Adamson after clotheslining Sean Manganti and served a one-game suspension. He was suspended for two games after hitting UST player Zach Huang in the face. He hit a game-winning three to send FEU to the Final Four, making up for his blunder the previous season. His college career ended when Ateneo beat them in their semifinal series.

== Professional career ==
=== Barangay Ginebra San Miguel (2020–2022) ===
Tolentino applied for the 2019 PBA Draft. He was drafted 10th overall in the first round by the Barangay Ginebra San Miguel. In his third game for Ginebra, he scored 11 points against the Meralco Bolts. In his first semifinal game, he scored 13 points and had 5 rebounds. In his 2020 PBA Philippine Cup finals debut, he had 14 points, 4 rebounds, and 3 steals, with his game-tying layup, as Ginebra won Game 1. Ginebra eventually won the championship. He also finished the season as a nominee for Rookie of the Year, and a member of the All-Rookie Team.

=== NorthPort Batang Pier (2022–2025) ===
On September 20, 2022, Tolentino, along with Prince Caperal and a 2022 first-round pick, was traded to the NorthPort Batang Pier for Jamie Malonzo.

On November 12, 2023, Tolentino scored a then career-high of 35 points and recorded nine rebounds in a 113–103 win against the Rain or Shine Elasto Painters. On August 29, 2024, he scored a new career-high of 51 points in a 135–109 victory against the Converge FiberXers, becoming the first local player since 2018 to have scored 50 or more points in a PBA game. On September 8, 2024, Tolentino recorded his 1st triple-double of his career with 23 points, 11 rebounds and 10 assists in a 133–107 victory against the Terrafirma Dyip.

=== Seoul SK Knights (2025–present) ===
On May 30, 2025, Tolentino signed a three-year deal with the Seoul SK Knights of the Korean Basketball League (KBL), replacing Juan Gómez de Liaño despite the latter being still under contract prior to that.

== PBA career statistics ==
Legend
| GP | Games played | MPG | Minutes per game | FG% | Field-goal percentage |
| 3FG% | 3-point field-goal percentage | 4P% | 4-point field-goal percentage | FT% | Free-throw percentage |
| RPG | Rebounds per game | APG | Assists per game | SPG | Steals per game |
| BPG | Blocks per game | PPG | Points per game | 127 | Career high |

As of the end of 2024–25 season

=== Season-by-season averages ===
| Year | Team | GP | MPG | FG% | 3P% | 4P% | FT% | RPG | APG | SPG | BPG | PPG |
|---|---|---|---|---|---|---|---|---|---|---|---|---|
| 2020 | Barangay Ginebra | 21 | 15.3 | .305 | .246 | — | .833 | 2.5 | .7 | .2 | .3 | 4.5 |
| 2021 | Barangay Ginebra | 27 | 15.1 | .361 | .313 | — | .652 | 1.9 | .4 | .4 | .3 | 6.1 |
| 2022–23 | Barangay Ginebra | 32 | 31.1 | .433 | .388 | — | .808 | 4.8 | 1.2 | .9 | .7 | 14.5 |
| 2022–23 | NorthPort | 32 | 31.1 | .433 | .388 | — | .808 | 4.8 | 1.2 | .9 | .7 | 14.5 |
| 2023–24 | NorthPort | 23 | 34.2 | .452 | .308 | — | .777 | 6.6 | 3.3 | 1.6 | 1.0 | 21.8 |
| 2024–25 | NorthPort | 30 | 39.2 | .453 | .308 | .160 | .790 | 7.6 | 4.2 | 1.4 | 1.0 | 21.2 |
| Career | | 133 | 27.7 | .426 | .328 | .160 | .784 | 4.8 | 2.0 | .9 | .7 | 14.0 |

== National team career ==
In his younger years, Tolentino played for the Philippines in numerous tournaments. He was a member of the RP U16 & U18 teams. In 2013, he played for the Philippines in the FIBA Asia 3x3 U18 Championship, along with Thirdy Ravena, Prince Rivero, and Kobe Paras. That same team also played in the 2013 FIBA 3x3 U18 World Championships.

In 2022, Tolentino was one of the final cuts from the final Gilas Pilipinas roster for the fifth window of the FIBA World Cup 2023 Asian Qualifiers.

== Personal life ==
Tolentino is married to Brandy Kramer, younger sister of former PBA player Doug Kramer. They have two daughters.
