= Christian Balagasay =

Filipino basketball player

No. 21 – Bataan Risers
- Position: Center
- League: MPBL

Personal information
- Born: October 28, 1996 (age 30) Pilar, Bataan, Philippines
- Listed height: 6 ft 5 in (1.96 m)
- Listed weight: 215 lb (98 kg)

Career information
- High school: Our Lady of Fatima High School (Valenzuela City)
- College: Letran
- PBA draft: 2019: 1st round, 12th overall pick
- Drafted by: Columbian Dyip
- Playing career: 2020–present

Career history
- 2020–2022: Columbian / Terrafirma Dyip
- 2023: NorthPort Batang Pier
- 2026-present: Bataan Risers

Career highlights
- 2× NCAA Philippines champion (2015, 2019)

Christian Balagasay (born October 28, 1996) is a Filipino professional basketball player for the Bataan Risers of the Maharlika Pilipinas Basketball League (MPBL). In college, he won two NCAA titles with the Letran Knights.

== College career ==
In high school, Balagasay played for Our Lady of Fatima High School in the NAASCU juniors. In college, he played for the Letran Knights in the NCAA. In his rookie season, he was a backup center to Jom Sollano as they won the title. Throughout his college career, he was a contributor from the bench, often playing few minutes. In his senior season, he scored a career-high 18 points in 22 minutes against the Perpetual Altas to clinch Letran a semifinals slot. Letran went on to win the title that year over the San Beda Red Lions.

== Professional career ==
=== Columbian / Terrafirma Dyip ===
Balagasay was selected with the last pick of the first round (12th overall) in the 2019 PBA Draft by the Columbian Dyip. He signed a two-year deal with the Dyip. As in college, his role was as a seldom-used backup center. In 2023, his contract expired and he did not renew with the Dyip.

=== NorthPort Batang Pier ===
A week before the 2023 Governors' Cup, Balagasay signed with the NorthPort Batang Pier. During the 2023–24 Commissioner's Cup, he became a free agent.

=== Bataan Risers ===
In 2026, Balagasay played for the Bataan Risers of the Maharlika Pilipinas Basketball League (MPBL).

== PBA career statistics ==
Legend
GP	Games played	MPG	Minutes per game
FG%	Field-goal percentage	3P%	3-point field-goal percentage	FT%	Free-throw percentage
RPG	Rebounds per game	APG	Assists per game	SPG	Steals per game
BPG	Blocks per game	PPG	Points per game	**Bold**	Career high

=== MPBL season-by-season averages ===
As of November 19, 2026

Year	Team	GP	MPG	FG%	3P%	FT%	RPG	APG	SPG	BPG	PPG
2026	Bataan Risers	25	10.8	45.8	.167	80	3	0.5	0.2	0.1	3.2

=== PBA season-by-season averages ===
As of the end of 2022–23 season

Year	Team	GP	MPG	FG%	3P%	FT%	RPG	APG	SPG	BPG	PPG
2020	Terrafirma	11	**10.7**	.286	.000	.000	**1.6**	**.4**	**.2**	**.1**	1.1
2021	Terrafirma	6	4.0	**.333**	**.333**	—	.3	.0	**.2**	.0	.8
2022–23	Terrafirma	**28**	7.9	.302	.214	**.833**	1.4	.1	.0	**.1**	**1.4**
2022–23	NorthPort	**28**	7.9	.302	.214	**.833**	1.4	.1	.0	**.1**	**1.4**
Career		45	8.1	.300	.222	.714	1.3	.2	.1	.1	1.2
