= The Leo =

The Leo may refer to:

- Theta Leonis, a star in the constellation of Leo
- PBA Leo Awards, an annual awards ceremony of the Philippine Basketball Association
