= 2020 PBA season =

45th PBA season

- Duration: March 8–11, 2020 (before first suspension); October 11–29, 2020 (resumption, second suspension); November 3 – December 9, 2020 (second resumption)
- Games: 86
- Teams: 12
- TV partner(s): Local: One Sports; TV5; One Sports; PBA Rush (HD); International: AksyonTV International; Online: One Sports PH Facebook Page

2019 PBA draft
- Top draft pick: Roosevelt Adams (Note: The 2019 draft was composed of two drafts: the Gilas special draft, which consists of 5 players reserved for the Gilas Pilipinas program, and the regular draft. Isaac Go was selected as the first pick in the Gilas special draft. Adams (College of Idaho) was selected by Columbian Dyip as the first pick of the regular draft.)
- Picked by: Columbian Dyip
- Top scorer: CJ Perez (Terrafirma Dyip)
- Philippine Cup champions: Barangay Ginebra San Miguel
- Philippine Cup runners-up: TNT Tropang Giga

Seasons
- ← 2019 2021 →

The 2020 PBA season or PBA Season 45 was the 45th season of the Philippine Basketball Association.

Due to the major adjustments in the last season's league calendar, the start of the league's 45th season was set on March 1, 2020, at the Smart Araneta Coliseum. However, the start of the 2020 season has been delayed until at least March 8 due to concerns over the COVID-19 pandemic.

The PBA Leo Awards for the 2019 season were held before the opening ceremonies. The first official activity for this season was the 2019 PBA draft, held before the semifinals of the 2019 PBA Governors' Cup.

The season was suspended on March 11, three days after its opening ceremonies, due to the COVID-19 pandemic and the enforcement of the enhanced community quarantine in Luzon.

The league initially planned to use the three-conference format, starting with the Philippine Cup. The Commissioner's Cup and the Governors' Cup were supposed to be the second and third conferences for this season.

On September 17, the PBA Board of Governors have approved a plan to restart the season on October 11 (originally on October 9), then was given a provisional approval by the Inter-Agency Task Force for the Management of Emerging Infectious Diseases (IATF-EID) on September 24. All games were played in the "PBA bubble" in Angeles City, the isolation zone specifically created for league operations.

This was first time that the league played only one tournament or conference in a season.

Since the season only had one conference, the Most Valuable Player was not awarded. In lieu of the Leo Awards usually given at the end of the season, the league held a special awards night on January 17, 2021, to award the Best Player of the Conference, Outstanding Rookie, Most Improved Player, Samboy Lim Sportsmanship Award and Outstanding/Elite Five.

== Executive board ==
- Commissioner: Willie Marcial
- Chairman: Ricky Vargas (Representing TNT Tropang Giga)
- Vice-Chairman: Demosthenes Rosales (Representing Terrafirma Dyip)
- Treasurer: Silliman Sy (Representing Blackwater Elite)

== Teams ==
Team	Company	Governor	Coach	Captain
Alaska Aces	Alaska Milk Corporation	Richard Bachmann	Jeffrey Cariaso	JVee Casio
Barangay Ginebra San Miguel	Ginebra San Miguel, Inc.	Alfrancis Chua	Tim Cone	LA Tenorio
Blackwater Elite	Ever Bilena Cosmetics, Inc.	Silliman Sy	Nash Racela	Mike Cortez
Magnolia Hotshots Pambansang Manok	San Miguel Pure Foods Company, Inc.	Rene Pardo	Chito Victolero	Rafi Reavis
Meralco Bolts	Manila Electric Company	Al Panlilio	Norman Black	Reynel Hugnatan
NLEX Road Warriors	Metro Pacific Investments Corporation	Rodrigo Franco	Yeng Guiao	Asi Taulava
NorthPort Batang Pier	Sultan 900 Capital, Inc.	Eric Arejola	Pido Jarencio	Sean Anthony
Phoenix Super LPG Fuel Masters	Phoenix Petroleum Philippines, Inc.	Raymond Zorrilla	Topex Robinson	Matthew Wright
Rain or Shine Elasto Painters	Asian Coatings Philippines, Inc.	Mamerto Mondragon	Caloy Garcia	Beau Belga
San Miguel Beermen	San Miguel Brewery, Inc.	Robert Non	Leo Austria	Arwind Santos
Terrafirma Dyip	Terrafirma Realty Development Corporation	Demosthenes Rosales	Johnedel Cardel	Glenn Khobuntin
TNT Tropang Giga	Smart Communications	Ricky Vargas	Bong Ravena	Jayson Castro

== Player quotas ==
=== Filipino-foreigners ===
The PBA allows for each team to have up to five players classified as "Filipino-foreigners" in their roster. Filipino-foreigners are natural born Filipinos born outside the Philippines.

Team	Country of birth (Note: Nationality indicates the player's place of birth, and may not necessarily hold the associated foreign citizenship. All players have Filipino citizenship.)			
Alaska Aces	(United States) Robbie Herndon	(United States) Michael DiGregorio	(United States) Maverick Ahanmisi	
Barangay Ginebra San Miguel	(United States) Joe Devance	(United States) Jared Dillinger	(United States) Stanley Pringle	
Blackwater Elite	(United States) Matt Salem			
Magnolia Hotshots Pambansang Manok	(United States) Rome dela Rosa	(United States) Rafi Reavis	(United States) Kyle Pascual	
Meralco Bolts	(United States) Cliff Hodge	(United States) Trevis Jackson	(United States) Chris Newsome	
NLEX Road Warriors	(Australia) Anthony Semerad	(Tonga) Asi Taulava	(United States) Paul Varilla	
NorthPort Batang Pier	(Germany) Christian Standhardinger	(Canada) Sean Anthony	(United States) Sean Manganti	
Phoenix Super LPG Fuel Masters	(Canada) Matthew Wright	(United States) Alex Mallari	(United States) Jason Perkins	
Rain or Shine Elasto Painters	(United States) Gabe Norwood	(United States) Norbert Torres	(United States) Adrian Wong	
San Miguel Beermen	(United States) Marcio Lassiter	(United States) Chris Ross	(United States) Moala Tautuaa	
Terrafirma Dyip	(Sweden) Andreas Cahilig	(United States) Roosevelt Adams	(United States) Rashawn McCarthy	(Hong Kong) CJ Perez
TNT Tropang Giga	(Australia) David Semerad	(United States) Harvey Carey	(United States) Simon Enciso	

=== Imports ===
There are no imports who played for the 2020 PBA season due to the cancellation of the Commissioner's Cup and the Governors' Cup.

== Arenas ==
In a usual PBA season, like several Metro Manila-centric leagues, most games are held at arenas within Metro Manila, either the Smart Araneta Coliseum or the Mall of Asia Arena, and sometimes, in the Ynares Center in Antipolo. Games outside this area are called "out-of-town" games, and are usually played on Saturdays. Provincial arenas usually host one game, rarely two; these arenas typically host only once per season, but a league may return within a season if the turnout is satisfactory. Typically, all playoff games are held in Metro Manila arenas, although playoff and finals games have been seldom played in the provinces.

Only one game day was done prior to the suspension of league activities due to COVID-19 pandemic; this was the opening day game held after the opening ceremonies at the Smart Araneta Coliseum.

After the league decided to resume the season under a bubble setup, it was decided that the Clark Freeport and Special Economic Zone^{1} in Pampanga shall host the bubble, with the Angeles University Foundation hosting the actual games.

Quezon City	Angeles City^{1}
Smart Araneta Coliseum	AUF Sports & Cultural Center

Note
1. For marketing purposes, games which took place in Angeles, within the PBA Bubble, were said to take place in "Smart Clark Giga City". The AUF Sports & Cultural Center was likewise rebranded as "AUF Sports Arena Powered by Smart 5G".

== Transactions ==
=== Retirement ===
- In February 2020, Yancy de Ocampo announced his retirement from the PBA. De Ocampo played for 6 franchises in his 17 seasons in the league.
- On April 14, 2020, Ranidel de Ocampo announced his retirement from the PBA. De Ocampo played for 3 franchises in his 16 seasons in the league.
- On September 7, 2020, Kelly Williams announced his retirement from the PBA. Williams played for 2 franchises in his 14 seasons in the league.
- On September 22, 2020, Peter June Simon announced his retirement from the PBA. Simon played for the Magnolia Hotshots in his 16 seasons in the league.

=== Coaching changes ===
Team	Outgoing coach	Manner of departure	Date of vacancy	Replaced with	Date of appointment	Ref.
Phoenix Super LPG Fuel Masters	Louie Alas	Fired	September 11, 2020	Topex Robinson (interim)	September 11, 2020	

== Notable events ==
- November 22, 2019: Ricky Vargas of TNT KaTropa was re-elected for a third consecutive term as the Chairman of the PBA Board of Governors. Bobby Rosales of Columbian Dyip was elected as Vice Chairman while Silliman Sy of Blackwater Elite was elected as treasurer.
- February 5: Reigning five-time Most Valuable Player June Mar Fajardo suffered a leg injury, fracturing his right tibia during their team practice.
- February 9: Greg Slaughter announced through his Instagram account that his contract with Barangay Ginebra San Miguel had expired and he will take an indefinite leave from basketball.
- The start of the 2020 season was postponed to March 8 due to concerns over the COVID-19 pandemic. The opening ceremonies were originally scheduled on March 1.
- June 4: The PBA Board of Governors approved the transfer of ownership of the Columbian Dyip franchise from Columbian Autocar Corporation to its sister company, Terrafirma Realty Development Corporation. The team will carry the Terrafirma brand.
- June 16: TNT KaTropa assistant coach Tab Baldwin was slapped with a three-game suspension plus a P75,000 fine by the commissioner's office for his comments on the league's officiating, tournament format and assessment of local coaches during a podcast. On June 25, he was fired by TNT as their assistant coach.
- July 6: Barangay Ginebra San Miguel's Japeth Aguilar and Rain or Shine Elasto Painters's Adrian Wong were fined P20,000 each after both players were seen playing five-on-five basketball a week earlier. They were also ordered to undergo a swab test and take a 14-day quarantine. The league announced on March that all player practices are banned indefinitely due to the COVID-19 pandemic.
- July 15: Blackwater Elite team owner Dioceldo Sy announced that he is planning to sell their PBA franchise for P150 million. This is after the PBA and the Games and Amusements Board considered to give sanctions against the team for violating league and health protocols following the alleged workout the team did on July 11. PBA Commissioner Willie Marcial slapped a P100,000 fine and required all players to undergo a swab-test.
- August 1: The Blackwater Elite will be renamed as the "Blackwater Bossing" starting in the 2021 season. Team owner Dioceldo Sy also retracted his plan to sell the team's franchise.
- September 26: The TNT KaTropa will be renamed as the "TNT Tropang Giga" upon the resumption of the Philippine Cup on October 11.
- September 30: The PBA D-League's Aspirants' Cup has been officially cancelled. Majority of the participating teams have collegiate or amateur players and the IATF-EID only allowed professional players to participate in practices and scrimmages.
- October 16: The San Miguel Beermen wore their throwback 1992 jerseys for the first time. The retro jerseys, which also features the PBA logo used from 1989 to 1992, will be worn in select games for the duration of the Philippine Cup in honor of the 130th anniversary of the San Miguel Pale Pilsen product.
- October 21: The league announced that a referee tested positive for COVID-19.
- October 24: The Alaska Aces wore their throwback 1996 jerseys in honor of the team that won the franchise's grand slam.
- October 25: The indefinite suspension on Phoenix Super LPG Fuel Masters' Calvin Abueva was lifted.
- October 25: In a separate press conference, PBA Commissioner Willie Marcial announced that one of the players of Blackwater Elite tested positive for COVID-19.
- November 1: Topex Robinson was appointed as the full-time head coach of the Phoenix Super LPG Fuel Masters.

== Opening ceremony ==
The opening ceremony for this season was held at the Smart Araneta Coliseum in Quezon City on March 8, 2020. The PBA Leo Awards for the 2019 season was held before the opening ceremonies.

The first game of the Philippine Cup between the San Miguel Beermen and the Magnolia Hotshots was played after the opening ceremonies.

Below is the list of team muses:

Team	Muse
Alaska Aces	Zowie Palliaer
Barangay Ginebra San Miguel	Sanya Lopez
Blackwater Elite	Joy Wu
Magnolia Hotshots Pambansang Manok	Kathryn Bernardo
Meralco Bolts	Leren Mae Bautista
NLEX Road Warriors	Pauline Lopez
NorthPort Batang Pier	Christine Patrimonio
Phoenix Super LPG Fuel Masters	Sarah Geronimo
Rain or Shine Elasto Painters	Chaiyene Huisman; Klyza Castro
San Miguel Beermen	Alyssa Muhlach
Terrafirma Dyip	Katrina Llegado
TNT Tropang Giga	Ariella Arida

== 2020 PBA Philippine Cup ==
The 2020 Philippine Cup started on March 8, 2020. The opening game which won by the San Miguel Beermen against the Magnolia Hotshots, 94–78, was the only game played for the tournament before the start of the quarantine period on March 11.

The tournament resumed on October 11, suspended again on October 30, resumed again on November 3, and ended on December 9.

=== Elimination round ===
Pos	Team	W	L	PCT	GB	Qualification
1	Barangay Ginebra San Miguel	8	3	.727 (Note: Head-to-head record: Barangay Ginebra 1–0 Phoenix)	—	Twice-to-beat in quarterfinals
2	Phoenix Super LPG Fuel Masters	8	3	.727	—	Twice-to-beat in quarterfinals
3	TNT Tropang Giga	7	4	.636 (Note: Head-to-head quotient: TNT 1.074, San Miguel 1.023, Meralco 0.992, Alaska 0.959, Magnolia 0.955)	1	Twice-to-beat in quarterfinals
4	San Miguel Beermen	7	4	.636	1	Twice-to-beat in quarterfinals
5	Meralco Bolts	7	4	.636	1	Twice-to-win in quarterfinals
6	Alaska Aces	7	4	.636	1	Twice-to-win in quarterfinals
7	Magnolia Hotshots Pambansang Manok	7	4	.636	1	Twice-to-win in quarterfinals
8	Rain or Shine Elasto Painters	6	5	.545	2	Twice-to-win in quarterfinals
9	NLEX Road Warriors	5	6	.455	3	
10	Blackwater Elite	2	9	.182	6	
11	NorthPort Batang Pier	1	10	.091 (Note: Head-to-head record: NorthPort 1–0 Terrafirma)	7	
12	Terrafirma Dyip	1	10	.091	7	

Source: PBA.ph
Rules for classification: 1) winning percentage; 2) if two teams are tied, head to head record; if three or more teams are tied, head-to-head goal average (quotient), if tied for 8th, one-game playoff; 3) overall quotient 4) coin toss

=== Playoffs ===
Quarterfinals (Top 4 twice-to-beat)
1	Barangay Ginebra	81
8	Rain or Shine	73
4	San Miguel	71	68
5	Meralco	78	90
2	Phoenix Super LPG	89
7	Magnolia	88
3	TNT	104
6	Alaska	83

Semifinals (Best-of-5)
1	Barangay Ginebra	3
5	Meralco	2
2	Phoenix Super LPG	2
3	TNT	3

Finals (Best-of-7)
1	Barangay Ginebra	4
3	TNT	1

==== Quarterfinals ====
Team 1	Series	Team 2	Game 1	Game 2
(1) Barangay Ginebra San Miguel*	1–0	(8) Rain or Shine Elasto Painters	81–73	—
(2) Phoenix Super LPG Fuel Masters*	1–0	(7) Magnolia Hotshots Pambansang Manok	89–88	—
(3) TNT Tropang Giga*	1–0	(6) Alaska Aces	104–83	—
(4) San Miguel Beermen*	0–2	(5) Meralco Bolts	71–78	68–90

*Team has twice-to-beat advantage. Team #1 only has to win once, while Team #2 has to win twice.

==== Semifinals ====
Team 1	Series	Team 2	Game 1	Game 2	Game 3	Game 4	Game 5
(1) Barangay Ginebra San Miguel	3–2	(5) Meralco Bolts	96–79	77–95	91–84	80–83	83–80
(2) Phoenix Super LPG Fuel Masters	2–3	(3) TNT Tropang Giga	92–95	110–103	92–89	101–102	81–91

==== Finals ====
Team 1	Series	Team 2	Game 1	Game 2	Game 3	Game 4	Game 5	Game 6	Game 7
(1) Barangay Ginebra San Miguel	4–1	(3) TNT Tropang Giga	100–94 (OT)	92–90	67–88	98–88	82–78	—	—

- Finals MVP: LA Tenorio (Barangay Ginebra San Miguel)
- Best Player of the Conference: Stanley Pringle (Barangay Ginebra San Miguel)

== Awards ==
=== Season awards ===
- Best Player of the Conference (Philippine Cup): Stanley Pringle (Barangay Ginebra)
- Outstanding Rookie: Aaron Black (Meralco)
- Most Improved Player: Prince Caperal (Barangay Ginebra)
- Elite Five:
  - Stanley Pringle (Barangay Ginebra)
  - Matthew Wright (Phoenix Super LPG)
  - Calvin Abueva (Phoenix Super LPG)
  - Japeth Aguilar (Barangay Ginebra)
  - John Paul Erram (TNT)
- Samboy Lim Sportsmanship Award: Scottie Thompson (Barangay Ginebra)

=== PBA Press Corps Annual Awards ===
- Top Bubble D-Fender: Justin Chua (Phoenix)
- Scoring Champion: CJ Perez (Terrafirma)
- Outstanding Coach of the Bubble: Tim Cone (Barangay Ginebra)
- Mr. Quality Minutes: RJ Jazul (Phoenix)
- Mr. Executive: Willie Marcial (PBA Commissioner)
- All-Rookie Team
  - Aaron Black (Meralco)
  - Arvin Tolentino (Barangay Ginebra)
  - Roosevelt Adams (Terrafirma)
  - Barkley Eboña (Alaska)
  - Renzo Subido (NorthPort)
- All Bubble D-Fenders
  - Mark Barroca (Magnolia)
  - Chris Ross (San Miguel)
  - Justin Chua (Phoenix)
  - Christian Standhardinger (NorthPort)
  - Calvin Abueva (Phoenix)
- Game of the Bubble: Barangay Ginebra vs. Meralco (November 27, 2020, Philippine Cup semifinals)
- President's Award: "Heroic 12" (all 12 PBA teams)

== Suspension and restart of Philippine Cup ==
On March 11, hours before Rudy Gobert tested positive for COVID-19 (causing the NBA to suspend its season), the PBA Board of Governors postponed the games of the Philippine Cup due to the COVID-19 pandemic and the enforcement of the enhanced community quarantine in Luzon. They have also decided to indefinitely postpone the ongoing PBA D-League Aspirants' Cup and the launching of the PBA 3x3 league.

On April 7, the PBA Board of Governors have decided to shorten the season to a two-conference format during their special meeting. There is also a possibility that the season will only have a single conference if the Enhanced Community Quarantine in Luzon will be further extended until April 30.

After the Enhanced Community Quarantine (ECQ) in Metro Manila and nearby provinces was extended until May 31, the Board of Governors have decided to set a deadline on August if the season will still be continued with a single tournament or if it will be cancelled.

On July 3, the Inter-Agency Task Force for the Management of Emerging Infectious Diseases (IATF-EID) announced that training for professional basketball and football are allowed after the PBA and Philippines Football League, together with the Philippine Sports Commission, Games and Amusements Board and the Department of Health, drafted guidelines for training for areas under General Community Quarantine (GCQ) and Modified General Community Quarantines (MGCQ). Metro Manila was classified as a GCQ area since June 1. The IATF-EID Joint Administrative Order was released on July 24.

The planned player swab testing and resumption of team practices were postponed after Metro Manila and its surrounding provinces were put under Modified Enhanced Community Quarantine (MECQ) on August 3 due to the surge of COVID-19 cases.

After Metro Manila returned to General Community Quarantine status on August 19, player swab testing was immediately done. Teams resumed their training sessions on August 25.

The league planned to resume the Philippine Cup in a "bubble setup" similar to how the NBA implemented their own bubble. The Araneta City in Cubao, the Inspire Sports Academy in Calamba, Laguna and the Clark Freeport Zone in Pampanga were considered as venues for the PBA bubble.

The PBA Board of Governors decided to hold the "PBA bubble" in the Clark area in Pampanga during their meeting on September 17. The games will be played at the Angeles University Foundation gymnasium while the players will stay at the Quest Hotel inside Clark. The league also plans to resume the Philippine Cup by October 11 if the league gets the approval from the IATF-EID. On September 24, the IATF-EID gave the league a provisional approval to have scrimmages and five-on-five games. The 12 teams of PBA arrived in Clark by batches on September 28 and 29, 2020.

On October 6, the league published its complete eliminations schedule. The elimination round games of the Philippine Cup were played daily, with two games scheduled per day. The league also decided to retain the results of the San Miguel Beermen's 94–78 win over the Magnolia Hotshots on March 8, 2020; the only game played prior to the suspension of the Philippine Cup.

On October 21, the league announced that one of the referees who officiated the Blackwater-Alaska game a day before has tested positive for COVID-19. The referee was sent to the Athlete's Village in Capas, Tarlac. The said facility was used during the 2019 Southeast Asian Games and is the primary quarantine facility for OFWs during the pandemic. The said referee was tested negative on his RT-PCR test four days after. On the same day, it was announced that one of the players of Blackwater Elite had tested positive for COVID-19. As a result, three games involving TNT and Blackwater have been postponed as of October 29. The games will be rescheduled on a later date once the approval from the IATF-EID will be given.

On October 30, 2020, the league announced through their social media accounts that the games will be postponed to ensure the integrity of the PBA bubble and until the new protocols set by the IATF-EID and the Department of Health are in place.

The following day, the PBA announced that they will resume its games on Tuesday, November 3 after the IATF-EID issued the following new guidelines:

- Completion of 10-day isolation of Blackwater player from the date of swabbing before resuming the games.
- Completion of 14-day quarantine and testing before entering the bubble for all those who will test positive moving forward; and
- The appointment of an independent marshal, who shall oversee and ensure compliance with health and safety protocols, as recommended by the DILG.

A quarantine facility will be set up within the Clark bubble for future COVID-19 positive cases.

In order for the league to finish the elimination round by November 11, two to four games were scheduled per day. This was the first time that the PBA held a quadruple-header game day.

== Cumulative standings ==
Pos	Team	Pld	W	L	PCT	Final result
1	Barangay Ginebra San Miguel	22	16	6	.727	Champions
2	Phoenix Super LPG Fuel Masters	17	11	6	.647	Semifinalist
3	Meralco Bolts	18	11	7	.611	Semifinalist
4	Alaska Aces	12	7	5	.583 (Note: Head-to-head record: Alaska 1–0 Magnolia)	Quarterfinalist
5	Magnolia Hotshots Pambansang Manok	12	7	5	.583	Quarterfinalist
6	TNT Tropang Giga	22	12	10	.545	Runner-up
7	San Miguel Beermen	13	7	6	.538	Quarterfinalist
8	Rain or Shine Elasto Painters	12	6	6	.500	Quarterfinalist
9	NLEX Road Warriors	11	5	6	.455	Elimination round
10	Blackwater Elite	11	2	9	.182	Elimination round
11	NorthPort Batang Pier	11	1	10	.091 (Note: Head-to-head record: NorthPort 1–0 Terrafirma)	Elimination round
12	Terrafirma Dyip	11	1	10	.091	Elimination round

Source: PBA.ph
Rules for classification: 1) winning percentage; 2) if two teams are tied, head-to-head record; if three or more teams are tied, head-to-head goal average (quotient), if tied for 8th, one-game playoff; 3) overall quotient 4) coin toss

=== Elimination round ===
See 2020 PBA Philippine Cup

=== Playoffs ===
Pos	Team	Pld	W	L
1	Barangay Ginebra San Miguel	11	8	3
2	TNT Tropang Giga	11	5	6
3	Meralco Bolts	7	4	3
4	Phoenix Super LPG Fuel Masters	6	3	3
5	Alaska Aces	1	0	1
6	Magnolia Hotshots Pambansang Manok	1	0	1
7	Rain or Shine Elasto Painters	1	0	1
8	San Miguel Beermen	2	0	2
9	NLEX Road Warriors	0	0	0
10	Blackwater Elite	0	0	0
11	NorthPort Batang Pier	0	0	0
12	Terrafirma Dyip	0	0	0

Source: PBA.ph
Rules for classification: 1) wins; 2) if two teams are tied, head-to-head record; if three or more teams are tied, head-to-head goal average (quotient), if tied for 8th, one-game playoff; 3) overall quotient 4) coin toss

== See also ==
- COVID-19 pandemic in the Philippines
- Impact of the COVID-19 pandemic on sports
