= Prince Caperal =

Filipino basketball player

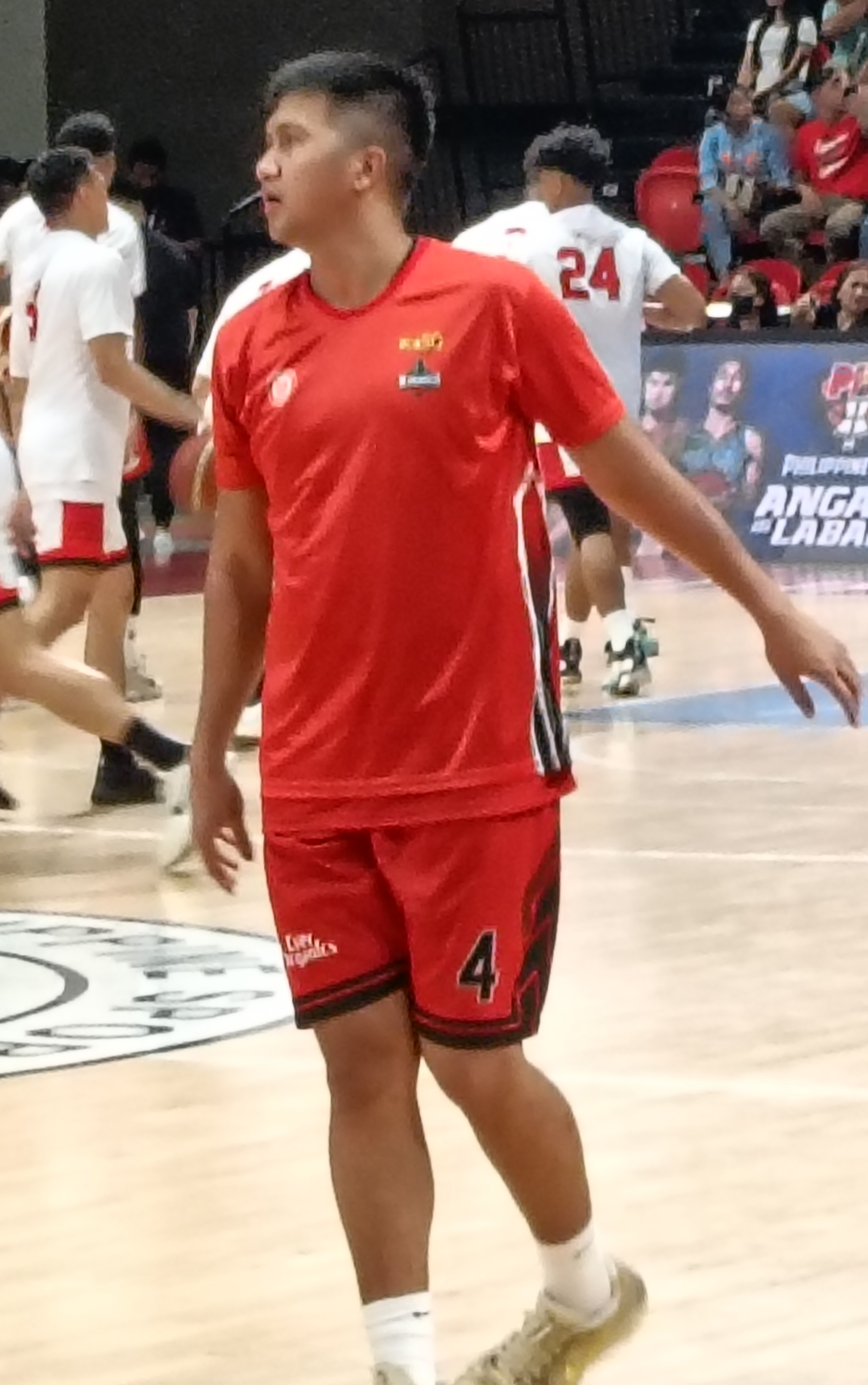
- Caperal in 2025

Free agent
- Position: Center / power forward

Personal information
- Born: June 12, 1993 (age 33) Quezon City, Philippines
- Listed height: 6 ft 7 in (2.01 m)
- Listed weight: 230 lb (104 kg)

Career information
- College: Arellano
- PBA draft: 2014: 2nd round, 17th overall pick
- Drafted by: GlobalPort Batang Pier
- Playing career: 2014–present

Career history
- 2014–2015: GlobalPort Batang Pier
- 2015–2016: Barako Bull Energy
- 2016–2017: Phoenix Fuel Masters
- 2017–2018: Mahindra Floodbuster / Kia Picanto
- 2018–2022: Barangay Ginebra San Miguel
- 2022–2024: NorthPort Batang Pier
- 2024: Abra Weavers
- 2025: Blackwater Bossing
- 2025–2026: Phoenix Fuel Masters / Phoenix Super LPG Fuel Masters

Career highlights
- 4× PBA champion (2018 Commissioner's, 2019 Governors', 2020 Philippine, 2021 Governors'); PBA Most Improved Player (2020)

Prince Renmer B. Caperal (born June 12, 1993) is a Filipino professional basketball player who last played for the Phoenix Super LPG Fuel Masters of the Philippine Basketball Association (PBA). He was drafted 17th overall by the GlobalPort Batang Pier in the 2014 PBA draft.

== College ==
Caperal attended Arellano University, where he went to the finals against San Beda college in 2014, his senior year.

== Professional career ==
=== GlobalPort Batang Pier (2014–2015) ===
Caperal was selected by the GlobalPort Batang Pier as the 17th overall pick in the 2014 PBA Draft.

=== Barako Bull Energy / Phoenix Fuel Masters (2015–2017) ===
In 2015, he was traded by the GlobalPort Batang Pier to the Barangay Ginebra San Miguel in exchange for fellow big man Dorian Peña and then he along with Mac Baracael, were shipped to the Barako Bull Energy.

=== Mahindra Floodbuster / Kia Picanto (2017–2018) ===
In 2017, Caperal was traded to the Phoenix Fuel Masters, but was immediately dealt to the Mahindra Floodbuster in exchange for rookie Joseph Eriobu.

=== Barangay Ginebra San Miguel (2018–2022) ===
In February 2018, Caperal signed with the Barangay Ginebra San Miguel. Caperal had been traded to Ginebra in 2015 but was immediately traded.

=== NorthPort Batang Pier (2022–2024) ===
On September 20, 2022, Caperal, along with Arvin Tolentino and a 2022 first-round pick, was traded to the NorthPort Batang Pier for Jamie Malonzo.

=== Zamboanga Valientes (2025) ===
He joined the Zamboanga Valientes during the Governor Hofer Invitational Basketball Championship in Zamboanga Sibugay.

=== Blackwater Bossing (2025) ===
On March 18, 2025, Caperal signed with the Blackwater Bossing.

=== Phoenix Fuel Masters (2025–2026) ===
On September 19, 2025, he signed with the Phoenix Fuel Masters, returning for his 2nd stint with the team.

== PBA career statistics ==
Legend
GP	Games played	MPG	Minutes per game	FG%	Field-goal percentage
3FG%	3-point field-goal percentage	4P%	4-point field-goal percentage	FT%	Free-throw percentage
RPG	Rebounds per game	APG	Assists per game	SPG	Steals per game
BPG	Blocks per game	PPG	Points per game	127	Career high

As of the end of 2025–26 season

=== Season-by-season averages ===
Year	Team	GP	MPG	FG%	3P%	4P%	FT%	RPG	APG	SPG	BPG	PPG
2014–15	GlobalPort	16	4.5	.379	.500	—	.667	.8	.1	—	.1	1.7
2015–16	Barako Bull	19	6.3	.422	.333	—	.875	1.4	.1	.1	.1	2.5
2015–16	Phoenix	19	6.3	.422	.333	—	.875	1.4	.1	.1	.1	2.5
2016–17	Phoenix	27	13.2	.381	.125	—	.625	3.6	.3	.1	.4	3.6
2016–17	Mahindra / Kia	27	13.2	.381	.125	—	.625	3.6	.3	.1	.4	3.6
2017–18	Kia	35	11.3	.477	.538	—	.714	2.7	.6	.1	.1	4.1
2017–18	Barangay Ginebra	35	11.3	.477	.538	—	.714	2.7	.6	.1	.1	4.1
2019	Barangay Ginebra	34	7.0	.286	.167	—	.800	1.5	.2	.1	.0	1.2
2020	Barangay Ginebra	22	21.1	.431	.420	—	.733	3.9	.8	.0	.2	7.8
2021	Barangay Ginebra	26	10.8	.333	.216	—	.667	2.5	.5	.1	.0	3.7
2022–23	Barangay Ginebra	34	7.2	.326	.154	—	.889	1.0	.2	.1	.1	2.1
2022–23	NorthPort	34	7.2	.326	.154	—	.889	1.0	.2	.1	.1	2.1
2023–24	NorthPort	9	6.7	.286	.308	—	.750	1.3	—	.1	—	2.1
2024–25	Blackwater	7	8.1	.409	.429	.500	—	.4	.3	—	—	3.7
2025–26	Phoenix / Phoenix Super LPG	17	8.7	.280	.290	.000	.750	1.8	.3	—	—	2.4
Career		246	9.9	.380	.300	.333	.729	2.1	.3	.1	.1	3.2
