= Adrian Wong (basketball) =

Filipino basketball player (born 1996)

Free agent
- Position: Shooting guard

Personal information
- Born: February 10, 1996 (age 30) Euless, Texas, U.S.
- Listed height: 6 ft 3 in (1.91 m)
- Listed weight: 175 lb (79 kg)

Career information
- High school: Trinity (Euless, Texas)
- College: Ateneo (2015–2016, 2018–2019)
- PBA draft: 2019: 1st round5th overall (Note: The 2019 draft was composed of two drafts: the Gilas special draft, which consists of 5 players reserved for the Philippine national team, and the regular draft. Isaac Go was selected as the first pick in the Gilas special draft. Wong was selected as the fifth pick of the regular draft.)
- Drafted by: Rain or Shine Elasto Painters
- Playing career: 2019–present

Career history
- 2019–2022: Rain or Shine Elasto Painters
- 2022–2023: Magnolia Hotshots
- 2023–2024: Converge FiberXers

Career highlights
- 2x UAAP champion (2018, 2019)

John Adrian Abando Wong (born February 10, 1996) is a Filipino-American professional basketball player who last played for the Converge FiberXers of the Philippine Basketball Association (PBA). After growing up in Dallas, Texas, he moved to the Philippines to pursue his college and professional basketball career.

== Early life ==
Wong was born in Euless, Texas to parents who were both Filipino nurses and grew up in Dallas. He started playing basketball in the 2nd grade when his father signed him up for a basketball camp.

One year later, he played AAU basketball for the Net Raiders. After that team disbanded, he transferred to the Texas Select team. He played for that team until his senior year.

He also played at Trinity High School, where he became teammates with future NBA leader in blocks Myles Turner. In his senior year, he averaged 10.6 points per game and 4 assists.

At the end of his high school career, his family chose between Ateneo, La Salle, or staying in the States. He ended up playing for Ateneo after his father emailed the coach at the time, Bo Perasol, about his son.

== College career ==
Wong moved to the Philippines with his older brother, Dan. His Ateneo teammate Von Pessumal and former Blue Eagle Chris Newsome helped him adjust to life in the Philippines.

In Wong's UAAP debut in Season 78, he played 17 minutes. He started the season playing as a shooting guard and had limited minutes. In the first game of the second round of eliminations, he had 14 points in a win over the FEU Tamaraws. After that performance, he moved over to the point guard position and became the main point guard off the bench. Against the De La Salle Green Archers, he and Aaron Black combined for 23 points off the bench. In the Final Four, Ateneo faced FEU once again, this time as the 3rd seed. He had 17 points off the bench in that game, but missed a layup that would have given Ateneo the lead. Instead, it set the stage for Mac Belo to make a buzzer-beating, game-winning putback, eliminating Ateneo and sending FEU to their second straight UAAP Finals.

In Season 79, Wong had an increased role, but struggled. He had 13 points in a win over FEU. He then had 17 points against the UE Red Warriors, but did not finish the game due to foul trouble. Still Ateneo made it to the Finals, where they lost to the Archers.

In January 2017, Wong suffered a torn ACL injury that kept him out of Season 80. Despite his absence, Ateneo was able to claim their first seniors basketball title in five years.

Wong was able to play again in 2018, as he joined Ateneo in competing at that year's Jones Cup. The Eagles won the championship once again, this time over the UP Fighting Maroons.

In Season 82, Wong had a career-high 18 points on 4-of-7 from three in a win over La Salle to help Ateneo secure a spot in the Final Four. They had no losses that season, as Ateneo went on to win its third straight. Although he had one more year of eligibility left, he decided not to use it, choosing to move on to the next chapter of his basketball career.

== Professional career ==
=== Rain or Shine Elasto Painters (2019–2022) ===
Wong was drafted 5th overall in the 2019 PBA Draft by the Rain or Shine Elasto Painters, and was signed to a two-year deal. During the suspension of the league due to COVID-19, he and Barangay Ginebra player Japeth Aguilar were caught on video playing pickup basketball, which was not allowed at the time. As a result, they were fined P20,000 each, and were required to do 30 hours of community service.

His best game of the rookie season was in a win against the NorthPort Batang Pier, when he had 15 points.

In the 2021 Philippine Cup, Wong hit a three-pointer in a 48–74 loss that prevented both teams for combining for the lowest scoring total in league history. Rain or Shine bounced back the next game, as Wong had 15 points in the win against the Terrafirma Dyip.

=== Magnolia Hotshots (2022–2023) ===
Wong became a free agent after his contract expired on January 30, 2022. Rain or Shine decided not to renew his contract as well. A week later, he signed with the Magnolia Hotshots on a two-year deal. In a blowout win against the Phoenix Super LPG Fuel Masters, he tied his career high with 18 points, making six out of seven of his threes.

During the 2023 PBA All-Star Weekend, Wong competed in the Team Greats vs. Team Stalwarts game, where he helped Team Greats get the victory with his 29 points, and claimed MVP honors.

=== Converge FiberXers (2023–2024) ===
On April 14, 2023, Wong, along with a 2022 first-round pick, was traded to the Converge FiberXers for David Murrell and Abu Tratter. On March 7, 2024, during the 2024 Philippine Cup, he announced that he would be taking a sabbatical from basketball.

== National team career ==
Wong played for Manila East in the 2014 World Tour Manila Masters. The team placed 8th in that tournament.

== PBA career statistics ==
Legend
GP	Games played	MPG	Minutes per game
FG%	Field-goal percentage	3P%	3-point field-goal percentage	FT%	Free-throw percentage
RPG	Rebounds per game	APG	Assists per game	SPG	Steals per game
BPG	Blocks per game	PPG	Points per game	**Bold**	Career high

As of the end of 2023–24 season

=== Season-by-season averages ===
Year	Team	GP	MPG	FG%	3P%	FT%	RPG	APG	SPG	BPG	PPG
2020	Rain or Shine	12	13.8	.279	.295	**1.000**	.9	.7	.3	.0	**4.6**
2021	Rain or Shine	31	15.1	**.412**	**.379**	.571	1.1	.5	**.5**	.0	4.5
2021	Magnolia	31	15.1	**.412**	**.379**	.571	1.1	.5	**.5**	.0	4.5
2022–23	Magnolia	**48**	**15.9**	.333	.270	.710	**1.3**	**.8**	.3	**.1**	3.6
2023–24	Converge	9	10.7	.148	.100	.250	1.1	.4	.4	–	1.2
Career		100	14.9	.336	.297	.684	1.2	.7	.4	.0	3.8
