= Roosevelt Adams =

Filipino-American basketball player

No. 5 – Rizing Zephyr Fukuoka
- Position: Small forward
- League: B.League

Personal information
- Born: May 22, 1994 (age 32) Yuma, Arizona, U.S.
- Listed height: 6 ft 5 in (1.96 m)
- Listed weight: 190 lb (86 kg)

Career information
- High school: West Valley (Hemet, California)
- College: Mt. San Jacinto (2014–2016); College of Idaho (2016–2017)
- NBA draft: 2018: undrafted
- PBA draft: 2019: 1st round1st overall (Note: The 2019 draft was composed of two drafts: the Gilas special draft, which consists of 5 players reserved for the Philippine national team, and the regular draft. Isaac Go was selected as the first pick in the Gilas special draft. Adams was selected as the first pick of the regular draft.)
- Drafted by: Columbian Dyip
- Playing career: 2019–present

Career history
- 2019: Pasay Voyagers
- 2020–2021: Terrafirma Dyip
- 2022–2023: Kagawa Five Arrows
- 2023–2025: Yamagata Wyverns
- 2025–2026: Tokushima Gambarous
- 2026–present: Rizing Zephyr Fukuoka

Career highlights
- PBA All-Rookie Team (2020)

Roosevelt Terrence Ocampo Adams (born May 22, 1994) is a Filipino-American professional basketball player for Rizing Zephyr Fukuoka of the Japanese B.League One. Adams was selected 1st overall by the Columbian Dyip in the regular draft of the 2019 PBA draft. He played college basketball at College of Idaho.

== Early life ==
Adams played high school basketball at West Valley High, where he earned All-Mountain Pass League honors.

== College career ==
As a Coyote, he played in all 34 games as a junior, including 21 starts. He averaged 8.7 points and 7.1 rebounds per game. He posted a career-high 24 points against Northwest University.

== Professional career ==
Adams is eligible to play as an import player with Asian lineage in Japan, Korea, or the Philippines. He finished the 2020 PBA Philippine Cup with averages of 10.3 points on 38.7% shooting, along with 8.1 rebounds per game. After not signing an extension with the Dyip, Adams became a restricted free agent in the PBA. Following his first year in the PBA, he signed with Terrafirma.

On September 21, 2022, Adams signed with Kagawa Five Arrows of the B2 League.

== Personal life ==
He is the son of Gregory and Anita Adams.

== PBA career statistics ==
Legend
| GP | Games played | MPG | Minutes per game |
| FG% | Field-goal percentage | 3P% | 3-point field-goal percentage | FT% | Free-throw percentage |
| RPG | Rebounds per game | APG | Assists per game | SPG | Steals per game |
| BPG | Blocks per game | PPG | Points per game | **Bold** | Career high |

As of the end of 2021 season

=== Season-by-season averages ===
| Year | Team | GP | MPG | FG% | 3P% | FT% | RPG | APG | SPG | BPG | PPG |
|---|---|---|---|---|---|---|---|---|---|---|---|
| 2020 | Terrafirma | 9 | **27.8** | .388 | .370 | **.778** | **8.1** | **.9** | .6 | .2 | **10.3** |
| 2021 | Terrafirma | **13** | 22.4 | **.404** | **.393** | .692 | 6.3 | .4 | .6 | **.4** | 9.2 |
| Career | | 22 | 24.6 | .397 | .382 | .727 | 7.0 | .6 | .6 | .3 | 9.7 |
