= 2020 PBA D-League Aspirants' Cup =

Ninth and final Aspirants' Cup season of the PBA D–League

2020 PBA D-League Aspirant's Cup
- The 9th PBA Aspirant's Cup
- Duration: March 2 – 11 (canceled)
- Number of teams: 12
- TV partner(s): One Sports; PBA Rush

PBA D-League Aspirant's Cup chronology
- < 2019 2022 >

The 2020 PBA D-League Aspirants' Cup was the ninth Aspirants' Cup season of the PBA D–League, the official minor league basketball organization owned by the Philippine Basketball Association (PBA). The conference commenced on February 13. However, the COVID-19 pandemic has been a concern for the league organizers, halting the season opening as a preventive measure against the outbreak. The conference started on March 2 but the league forced indefinite suspension of games nine days later.

On September 30, 2020, PBA commissioner Willie Marcial announced that the tournament has been officially canceled.

== Format ==
Twelve teams participate in the conference. The tournament will be conducted in four stages:

- Single round-robin elimination, where a team plays the other teams once. The six teams with the worst records are eliminated. The top two placers advance to the semifinals outright.
- The quarterfinals, #3 seeded team faces #6 seeded team and #4 seeded team plays the #5 seeded team. Higher seeds possess the twice-to-beat advantage.
- The semifinals, #1 seeded team faces the winner of #4 vs #5 quarterfinals while #2 seeded team plays the winner of #3 vs #6 quarterfinals. This is a best-of-three playoff.
- The finals, which is a best-of-three series.

== Venues ==
Most games will be played at the Ynares Sports Arena in Pasig. Other venues include the Paco Arena in Manila and JCSGO Gym in Quezon City. Filoil Flying V Centre was only used on the opening games of the season.

== Teams ==
The following are the participating teams:

Team		Head coach
AMA	AMA Online Education Titans	Mark Herrera
CEU	Karate Kid–CEU Scorpions	Jeff Napa
DIL	Diliman Blue Dragons	Rensy Bajar
DLS	Eco Oil–La Salle Green Archers	Derrick Pumaren
FEU	Seaoil Extreme Racers–FEU Tamaraws	Olsen Racela
FME	FamilyMart–Enderun Titans	Pipo Noundou
LET	Wang's Basketball Couriers–Letran Knights	Bonnie Tan
MAP	Marinerong Pilipino Skippers	Yong Garcia
MAU	ADG Dong–Mapúa Cardinals	Randy Alcantara
SSC	Apex Fuel–San Sebastian Golden Stags	Edgardo Macaraya
TIP	TIP Engineers	Sebastian de Vera
UST	Builders Warehouse–UST Growling Tigers	Aldin Ayo

== Elimination round ==
=== Team standings ===
Pos	Team	Pld	W	L	PCT	GB	Qualification
1	Builders Warehouse–UST Growling Tigers	2	2	0	1.000	—	Advance to the semifinals
2	Marinerong Pilipino Skippers	2	2	0	1.000	—	Advance to the semifinals
3	Eco Oil–La Salle Green Archers	2	2	0	1.000	—	Twice-to-beat in the quarterfinals
4	Apex Fuel–San Sebastian Golden Stags	1	1	0	1.000	0.5	Twice-to-beat in the quarterfinals
5	Seaoil Extreme Racers–FEU Tamaraws	1	1	0	1.000	0.5	Twice-to-win in the quarterfinals
6	ADG Dong–Mapúa Cardinals	1	0	1	.000	1.5	Twice-to-win in the quarterfinals
7	Diliman Blue Dragons	1	0	1	.000	1.5	
8	FamilyMart–Enderun Titans	1	0	1	.000	1.5	
9	TIP Engineers	1	0	1	.000	1.5	
10	Wang's Basketball Couriers–Letran Knights	1	0	1	.000	1.5	
11	AMA Online Education Titans	1	0	1	.000	1.5	
12	Karate Kid–CEU Scorpions	2	0	2	.000	2	

Updated to match(es) played on March 9, 2020. Source: PBA.ph
Rules for classification: 1) winning percentage; 2) if two teams are tied, head-to-head record; if three or more teams are tied, head-to-head goal average (quotient); 3) overall quotient 4) coin toss

=== Schedule ===
Team ╲ Game	1	2	3	4	5	6	7	8	9	10	11
AMA Online Education Titans	SSC										
Karate Kid–CEU Scorpions	MAP	DLS									
Diliman Blue Dragons	UST										
Eco Oil–La Salle Green Archers	LET	CEU									
Seaoil Extreme Racers–FEU Tamaraws	FME										
FamilyMart–Enderun Titans	FEU										
Wang's Basketball Couriers–Letran Knights	DLS										
Marinerong Pilipino Skippers	CEU	MAU									
ADG Dong–Mapúa Cardinals	MAP										
Apex Fuel–San Sebastian Golden Stags	AMA										
TIP Engineers	UST										
Builders Warehouse–UST Growling Tigers	TIP	DIL									

= Win; = OT win; = Loss; = OT loss

=== Results ===
Teams	AMA	CEU	DIL	DLS	FEU	FME	LET	MAP	MAU	SSC	TIP	UST
AMA Online Education Titans	—									67–113		
Karate Kid–CEU Scorpions		—		73–79				57–93				
Diliman Blue Dragons			—									93–106
Eco Oil–La Salle Green Archers				—			102–90					
Seaoil Extreme Racers–FEU Tamaraws					—	99–82						
FamilyMart–Enderun Titans						—						
Wang's Basketball Couriers–Letran Knights							—					
Marinerong Pilipino Skippers								—	83–69			
ADG Dong–Mapúa Cardinals									—			
Apex Fuel–San Sebastian Golden Stags										—		
TIP Engineers											—	62–115
Builders Warehouse–UST Growling Tigers												—

Updated to match(es) played on March 9, 2020. Source: PBA.ph
Legend: Blue = left column team win; Red = top row team win.
Matches with lighter background shading were decided after overtime.
