= 2019 PBA draft =

Player selection in Philippine basketball

General information
- Date: December 8, 2019
- Location: Robinsons Place Manila
- Networks: ESPN 5 (The 5 Network, PBA Rush, TV5.ESPN.com)

Overview
- League: Philippine Basketball Association
- First selection: Roosevelt Adams, (Note: The 2019 draft was composed of two drafts: the Gilas special draft, which consists of 5 players reserved for the Gilas Pilipinas program, and the regular draft. Go was selected as the first pick in the Gilas special draft. Roosevelt Adams (College of Idaho) was selected by Columbian Dyip as the first pick of the regular draft.) Columbian Dyip

The 2019 Philippine Basketball Association (PBA) rookie draft was an event that allows teams to take turns selecting amateur basketball players and other eligible players, including half-Filipino foreign players. The league determined the drafting order based on the performance of two-thirds of the member teams from the 2019 season, with the worst team picking first.

== Draft order ==
The draft order was determined based on the overall performance of the teams from the previous season. The Philippine Cup final ranking comprises 40% of the points, while the rankings of the Commissioner's and Governors' Cups are 25% each. The order for teams picking 9th to 12th was determined by their positions after the Governors' Cup regular round. NorthPort and Rain or Shine swapped places during the draft.

Draft order	Team	Final ranking			Total
Draft order	Team	PHI	COM	GOV	Total
1st	Columbian Dyip	10th	11th	10th	10.3
2nd	Blackwater Elite	12th	6th	12th	10.2
3rd	NLEX Road Warriors	9th	12th	5th	8.7
4th	Alaska Aces	8th	8th	7th	7.7
5th	Meralco Bolts	11th	9th	2nd	7.7
6th	Phoenix Pulse Fuel Masters	3rd	10th	11th	7.5
7th	NorthPort Batang Pier	7th	5th	8th	6.7
8th	Rain or Shine Elasto Painters	4th	4th	9th	5.5
9th	Magnolia Hotshots Pambansang Manok	2nd	7th	6th	4.7
10th	Barangay Ginebra San Miguel	5th	3rd	4th	4.1
11th	TNT KaTropa	6th	2nd	3rd	3.9
12th	San Miguel Beermen	1st	1st	5th	2.2

=== Special draft ===
There was a separate draft for the players in the pool for the Philippine national team, better known as Gilas Pilipinas. The five teams held their rights to the players they selected only after their release from international duty.

As part of the agreement between the PBA and the Samahang Basketbol ng Pilipinas, the latter named 5 players being loaned to Gilas's training camp after their selection in this special draft. The draft order was identical to the first five picks in the regular first and second rounds.

== Draft selections ==
PG	Point guard	SG	Shooting guard	SF	Small forward	PF	Power forward	C	Center	*	Mythical team member	^{#}	All-Star

=== Special round ===
Pick	Player	Pos.	Country of birth	Team	PBA D-League team	School
1	Isaac Go	C/PF	Philippines	Columbian Dyip	Cignal HD Hawkeyes	Ateneo
2	Rey Suerte	SG/SF	Philippines	Blackwater Elite	Che'Lu Bar & Grill Revellers	UE
3	Matt Nieto	PG	Philippines	NLEX Road Warriors	Cignal HD Hawkeyes	Ateneo
4	Allyn Bulanadi	SG	Philippines	Alaska Aces	Valencia City, Bukidnon	San Sebastian
5	Mike Nieto	SF	Philippines	Rain or Shine Elasto Painters	Cignal HD Hawkeyes	Ateneo

=== 1st round ===
Pick	Player	Pos.	Country of birth	Team	PBA D-League team	School
1	Roosevelt Adams	SF	United States	Columbian Dyip	Go for Gold Scratchers	College of Idaho
2	Maurice Shaw	C	Philippines	Blackwater Elite		Hutchinson CC
3	Mike Ayonayon	SG/PG	Philippines	NLEX Road Warriors	Marinerong Pilipino Skippers	Philippine Christian
4	Barkley Eboña	PF/C	Philippines	Alaska Aces	Cha Dao Tea Place	Far Eastern
5	Adrian Wong	SG/SF	United States	Rain or Shine Elasto Painters (from Phoenix Pulse via Alaska) (Note: August 16, 2019: Alaska to Rain or Shine: Rain or Shine acquired Phoenix's first-round pick and Chris Exciminiano; Alaska acquired Maverick Ahanmisi; August 7, 2018: Phoenix Pulse (Phoenix) to Alaska: Alaska acquired a first-round pick and Karl Dehesa; Phoenix acquired Calvin Abueva)	Cignal HD Hawkeyes	Ateneo
6	Clint Doliguez	SF	Philippines	Rain or Shine Elasto Painters (from Meralco) (Note: May 13, 2019: Meralco to Rain or Shine: Rain or Shine acquired 2019 and 2022 (Season 47) first-round picks; Meralco acquired Raymond Almazan)	Metropac Movers	San Beda
7	Prince Rivero	PF	Philippines	Rain or Shine Elasto Painters		De La Salle
8	Sean Manganti	SF	United States	NorthPort Batang Pier	Che'Lu Bar & Grill Revellers	Adamson
9	Aris Dionisio^{#}	SF/PF	Philippines	Magnolia Hotshots Pambansang Manok	Gamboa Coffee Mixers	St. Clare
10	Arvin Tolentino^{#}	SF/PF	Philippines	Barangay Ginebra San Miguel	Wang's Basketball Couriers	Far Eastern
11	Kib Montalbo	PG/SG	Philippines	TNT KaTropa	Marinerong Pilipino Skippers	De La Salle
12	Christian Balagasay	C	Philippines	Columbian Dyip (from San Miguel) (Note: October 27, 2017: San Miguel to Columbian (Kia): Kia acquired Rashawn McCarthy, Ronald Tubid, Jay-R Reyes, and a first-round pick; San Miguel acquired a 2017 first-round pick)	Petron	Letran

=== 2nd round ===
Pick	Player	Pos.	Country of birth	Team	PBA D-League team	School
13	Jerrick Balanza	SG	Philippines	Barangay Ginebra San Miguel (from Columbian) (Note: November 15, 2016: Columbian (Mahindra) to Barangay Ginebra: Ginebra acquired a future second-round pick; Mahindra acquired Nico Salva)	Petron	Letran
14	Richard Escoto	SF/PF	Philippines	Blackwater Elite	Phoenix Accelerators	Far Eastern
15	Will McAloney	C/PF	Philippines	NLEX Road Warriors	Marinerong Pilipino Skippers	San Carlos
16	Rey Publico	PF	Philippines	Alaska Aces	Go for Gold Scratchers	Letran
17	Jaycee Marcelino	PG/SG	Philippines	Alaska Aces (from Phoenix Pulse) (Note: December 15, 2017: Phoenix Pulse (Phoenix) to Alaska: Alaska acquired a second-round pick; Phoenix acquired Jaypee Mendoza)	Zark's Jawbreakers	Lyceum
18	Aaron Black	PG/SG	Philippines	Meralco Bolts	AMA Online Education Titans	Ateneo
19	Vince Tolentino	SF	United States	Rain or Shine Elasto Painters	Go for Gold Scratchers	Ateneo
20	AC Soberano	SG	Philippines	NLEX Road Warriors (from NorthPort via TNT) (Note: May 6, 2017: NorthPort (GlobalPort) to NLEX (four-team trade with Meralco and TNT): NLEX (via GlobalPort) acquired Larry Fonacier and GlobalPort's second-round pick from TNT, and Kia's 2017 second-round pick from Meralco; GlobalPort acquired Sean Anthony and Bradwyn Guinto from NLEX, and Jonathan Grey from Meralco; Meralco acquired Garvo Lanete from NLEX via GlobalPort; TNT acquired Anthony Semerad and re-acquired their 2017 first-round pick from GlobalPort)	Metropac Movers	San Beda
21	Yankie Haruna	SF	Philippines	Magnolia Hotshots Pambansang Manok	Go for Gold Scratchers	St. Benilde
22	Kent Salado	PG/SG	Philippines	Barangay Ginebra San Miguel	Go for Gold Scratchers	Arellano
23	Wendell Comboy	SG	Philippines	Rain or Shine Elasto Painters (from TNT) (Note: October 2, 2014: TNT (Talk 'n Text) to Rain or Shine: Rain or Shine acquired 2015 and 2019 second-round picks; Talk 'n Text acquired Larry Rodriguez)	Cha Dao Tea Place	Far Eastern
24	Renzo Subido	PG	Philippines	NorthPort Batang Pier (from San Miguel) (Note: December 10, 2014: San Miguel to NorthPort (GlobalPort): GlobalPort acquired 2018 and 2019 second-round picks, and re-acquired Sol Mercado; San Miguel re-acquired Alex Cabagnot)	Ironcon Builders	Santo Tomas

=== 3rd round ===
Pick	Player	Pos.	Country of birth	Team	PBA D-League team	School
25	Bonbon Batiller	SG	Philippines	Columbian Dyip	Petron	Letran
26	Chris Bitoon	PG	Philippines	Blackwater Elite	Go for Gold Scratchers	St. Clare
27	Gelo Vito	PF	Philippines	NLEX Road Warriors	Wang's Basketball Couriers	Philippines
28	Ralph Tansingco	PF	Philippines	Phoenix Pulse Fuel Masters	Zark's Jawbreakers	Lyceum
29	Mike Cañete	PF	Philippines	Meralco Bolts	The Masterpiece / CD14 Designs-Trinity	Arellano
30	Luke Parcero	SG	Philippines	Rain or Shine Elasto Painters	AMA Online Education Titans	St. Francis of Assisi
31	Cris Dumapig	C/PF	Philippines	NorthPort Batang Pier	BRT Sumisip Basilan	Southwestern-U
32	Alvin Capobres	SF	Philippines	Magnolia Hotshots Pambansang Manok	Valencia City, Bukidnon	San Sebastian
33	Fran Asuncion	SG	Philippines	Barangay Ginebra San Miguel	AMA Online Education Titans	AMA
34	Simon Camacho	PF	Philippines	TNT KaTropa	Akari	Adamson
35	Travis Thompson	SG	United States	San Miguel Beermen		Alaska Anchorage

=== 4th round ===
Pick	Player	Pos.	Country of birth	Team	PBA D-League team	School
36	Marco Balagtas	PF	Philippines	Columbian Dyip	Diliman College-Gerry's	José Rizal
37	Hubert Cani	SG	Philippines	Blackwater Elite	Cha Dao Tea Place	Far Eastern
38	Jayvee Marcelino	PG	Philippines	NLEX Road Warriors	Wang's Basketball Couriers	Lyceum
39	Spencer Pretta	PG	Philippines	Phoenix Pulse Fuel Masters	Zark's Jawbreakers	Lyceum
40	Dexter Zamora	PG	Philippines	NorthPort Batang Pier	Batangas - EAC	Lyceum
41	Val Chauca	PG	United States	TNT KaTropa	FamilyMart - Enderun	Adamson
42	Daniel de Guzman	PF	Philippines	San Miguel Beermen	Batangas - EAC	NEUST

=== 5th round ===
Pick	Player	Pos.	Country of birth	Team	PBA D-League team	School
43	Jeramer Cabanag	SG	Philippines	NLEX Road Warriors	Wang's Basketball Couriers	San Beda
44	Jeffrey Santos	SG	Philippines	Phoenix Pulse Fuel Masters	Zark's Jawbreakers	Lyceum
45	Von Tambeling	SG	Philippines	San Miguel Beermen	Wang's Basketball Couriers	Philippine Christian

=== 6th round ===
A sixth round was supposed to be held, but the teams from the fifth round passed, ending the draft.

== Draft picks per school ==
School	Special round	1st round	After 1st round	Total
Lyceum	0	0	7	7
Ateneo	3	1	2	6
FEU	0	2	2	4
Letran	0	1	3	4
Adamson	0	1	2	3
San Beda	0	1	2	3
Arellano	0	0	2	2
De La Salle	0	2	0	2
PCU	0	1	1	2
UST	0	0	2	2
St. Clare	0	1	1	2
St. Francis	0	0	1	1
Other schools				1 each

== Trades involving draft picks ==
=== Pre-draft trades ===
Prior to the day of the draft, the following trades were made and resulted in exchanges of picks between the teams.

== Undrafted player ==
Name	Country of birth	College	Notes
Marvin Lee	Philippines	UST	
