= 2019 NLEX Road Warriors season =

- Head coach: Yeng Guiao
- Owners: Metro Pacific Investments Corporation (an MVP Group subsidiary)

Philippine Cup results
- Record: 4–7 (36.4%)
- Place: 9th
- Playoff finish: Did not qualify

Commissioner's Cup results
- Record: 3–8 (27.3%)
- Place: 12th
- Playoff finish: Did not qualify

Governors' Cup results
- Record: 8–3 (72.7%)
- Place: 1st
- Playoff finish: Quarterfinalist (lost to NorthPort with twice-to-win disadvantage)

NLEX Road Warriors seasons

The 2019 NLEX Road Warriors season was the 5th season of the franchise in the Philippine Basketball Association (PBA).

== Key dates ==
=== 2018 ===
- December 16: The 2018 PBA draft took place in Midtown Atrium, Robinson Place Manila.

== Draft picks ==
Round	Pick	Player	Position	Nationality	PBA D-League team	College
1	4	Paul Desiderio	G	Philippines	Go for Gold	UP
1	7	Abu Tratter	C	Philippines	Marinerong Pilipino Skippers	De La Salle
2	16	Kris Porter	F	Philippines	Go for Gold	Ateneo
3	29	Kyles Lao	G	Philippines	AMA	UP
4	38	Dan Wong	G	United States	Go for Gold	Ateneo

== Roster ==
2019 NLEX Road Warriors roster
Players
Coaches

Pos.	#	POB	Name	Height	Weight	DOB (YYYY–MM–DD)	From
G	1	(Philippines)	Emman Monfort (IN)	5 ft 6 in (1.68 m)	132 lb (60 kg)	1989–07–02	Ateneo
F/C	2	(Philippines)	Michael Miranda	6 ft 6 in (1.98 m)	210 lb (95 kg)	1990–12–12	San Sebastian
F	5	(Philippines)	Jansen Rios	6 ft 3 in (1.91 m)	185 lb (84 kg)	1991–10–28	Adamson
G	6	(Philippines)	Kevin Alas	6 ft 0 in (1.83 m)	175 lb (79 kg)	1991–11–13	Letran
C	7	(Philippines)	John Paul Erram	6 ft 8 in (2.03 m)	227 lb (103 kg)	1989–07–07	Ateneo
G/F	8	(Philippines)	Cyrus Baguio	6 ft 2 in (1.88 m)	180 lb (82 kg)	1980–08–19	UST
G	9	(Philippines)	Philip Paniamogan	6 ft 0 in (1.83 m)	180 lb (82 kg)	1991–05–30	José Rizal
F	10	(United States)	Paul Varilla	6 ft 3 in (1.91 m)		–10–08	UE
G/F	12	(Philippines)	Larry Fonacier	6 ft 3 in (1.91 m)	170 lb (77 kg)	1982–05–13	Ateneo
G	13	(Philippines)	Kyles Lao	6 ft 0 in (1.83 m)		1995–06–10	UP Diliman
G	15	(Philippines)	Kiefer Ravena	5 ft 11 in (1.80 m)	180 lb (82 kg)	1993–10–27	Ateneo
C	16	(Philippines)	Raul Soyud	6 ft 5 in (1.96 m)	220 lb (100 kg)	1991–01–14	Philippines
F	17	(Philippines)	Kenneth Ighalo	6 ft 2 in (1.88 m)	175 lb (79 kg)	1989–01–11	Mapúa
F/C	37	(Philippines)	J. R. Quiñahan	6 ft 6 in (1.98 m)	235 lb (107 kg)	1984–05–08	Visayas
G	39	(Philippines)	Jericho Cruz	6 ft 1 in (1.85 m)	190 lb (86 kg)	1990–10–11	Adamson
G	77	(Philippines)	Bong Galanza	6 ft 2 in (1.88 m)	185 lb (84 kg)	1992–12–21	UE
C	88	(Tonga)	Asi Taulava (C)	6 ft 9 in (2.06 m)	245 lb (111 kg)	1973–03–02	BYU–Hawaii

Head coach

- (Philippines) Yeng Guiao

Assistant coach(es)

- (Philippines) Adonis Tierra (1st assistant)
- (Philippines) Ford Arao
- (Philippines) Jojo Lastimosa
- (Philippines) Jonas Mendoza
- (Philippines) Jaime Serrano

Team manager

- (Philippines) Ronald Dulatre
- (Philippines) Raymond Celis (Assistant)

Legend

- (C) Team captain
- (CI) Commissioner's Cup Import
- (GI) Governors' Cup Import
- (EI) EASL Import
- (DP) Unsigned draft pick
- (FA) Free agent
- (IN) Inactive
- (S) Suspended
- (R) Rookie
- Injured

Roster

== Philippine Cup ==
=== Eliminations ===
==== Standings ====
Pos	Team	W	L	PCT	GB	Qualification
1	Phoenix Pulse Fuel Masters	9	2	.818	—	Twice-to-beat in the quarterfinals
2	Rain or Shine Elasto Painters	8	3	.727	1	Twice-to-beat in the quarterfinals
3	Barangay Ginebra San Miguel	7	4	.636 (Note: Head-to-head quotient: Barangay Ginebra 1.02, TNT 1.00, San Miguel 0.98)	2	Best-of-three quarterfinals
4	TNT KaTropa	7	4	.636	2	Best-of-three quarterfinals
5	San Miguel Beermen	7	4	.636	2	Best-of-three quarterfinals
6	Magnolia Hotshots Pambansang Manok	6	5	.545	3	Best-of-three quarterfinals
7	NorthPort Batang Pier	5	6	.455	4	Twice-to-win in the quarterfinals
8	Alaska Aces	4	7	.364 (Note: Head-to-head quotient: NLEX 1.19, Alaska 1.01, Columbian 0.84; 8th-seed playoff: Alaska 88–80 NLEX)	5	Twice-to-win in the quarterfinals
9	NLEX Road Warriors	4	7	.364	5	
10	Columbian Dyip	4	7	.364	5	
11	Meralco Bolts	3	8	.273	6	
12	Blackwater Elite	2	9	.182	7	

Source: PBA.ph
Rules for classification: 1) winning percentage; 2) if two teams are tied, head-to-head record; if three or more teams are tied, head-to-head goal average (quotient), if tied for 8th, one-game playoff; 3) overall quotient 4) coin toss

==== Game log ====
2019 PBA Philippine Cup game log
Total: 4–7
January: 1–3

Game	Date	Opponent	Score	High points	High rebounds	High assists	Location Attendance	Record
1	January 18	Rain or Shine	L 87–96	J. R. Quiñahan (19)	Philip Paniamogan (8)	J. R. Quiñahan (5)	Cuneta Astrodome	0–1
2	January 20	NorthPort	L 90–95	John Paul Erram (19)	Marion Magat (8)	Kevin Alas (7)	Smart Araneta Coliseum	0–2
3	January 23	TNT	L 80–85	Erram, Galanza (19)	J. R. Quiñahan (9)	Alas, Tallo (7)	Smart Araneta Coliseum	0–3
4	January 27	Columbian	W 107–97	John Paul Erram (23)	Marion Magat (13)	Mark Tallo (8)	Smart Araneta Coliseum	1–3

February: 1–1

Game	Date	Opponent	Score	High points	High rebounds	High assists	Location Attendance	Record
5	February 2	Meralco	W 87–83	J. R. Quiñahan (16)	Erram, Magat (8)	John Paul Erram (7)	Ynares Center	2–3
6	February 8	Phoenix	L 82–83	J. R. Quiñahan (14)	John Paul Erram (15)	Philip Paniamogan (8)	Mall of Asia Arena	2–4

March: 2–2

Game	Date	Opponent	Score	High points	High rebounds	High assists	Location Attendance	Record
7	March 8	San Miguel	L 111–121	J. R. Quiñahan (17)	J. R. Quiñahan (10)	Juami Tiongson (13)	Smart Araneta Coliseum	2–5
8	March 13	Alaska	W 91–70	Galanza, Quiñahan (14)	John Paul Erram (12)	Paniamogan, Tiongson (4)	Smart Araneta Coliseum	3–5
9	March 17	Blackwater	W 122–101	Philip Paniamogan (25)	John Paul Erram (10)	Juami Tiongson (11)	Smart Araneta Coliseum	4–5
10	March 24	Barangay Ginebra	L 96–105	John Paul Erram (16)	John Paul Erram (8)	J. R. Quiñahan (6)	Angeles University Foundation Sports Arena	4–6

April: 0–1

Game	Date	Opponent	Score	High points	High rebounds	High assists	Location Attendance	Record
11	April 3	Magnolia	L 74–102	Bong Galanza (10)	John Paul Erram (12)	Philip Paniamogan (4)	Smart Araneta Coliseum	4–7

=== Playoffs ===
==== Bracket ====
Quarterfinals
(#1 twice-to-beat)
1	Phoenix	91
8	Alaska	76
(Best-of-3)
4	TNT	1
5	San Miguel	2
(#2 twice-to-beat)
2	Rain or Shine	91
7	NorthPort	85
(Best-of-3)
3	Barangay Ginebra	1
6	Magnolia	2

Semifinals (Best-of-7)
1	Phoenix	1
5	San Miguel	4
2	Rain or Shine	3
6	Magnolia	4

Finals (Best-of-7)
5	San Miguel	4
6	Magnolia	3

==== Game log ====
2019 PBA Philippine Cup playoffs game log
Total: 0–1
8th seed playoff: 0–1

Game	Date	Opponent	Score	High points	High rebounds	High assists	Location Attendance	Series
1	April 5	Alaska	L 80–88	Kenneth Ighalo (16)	John Paul Erram (19)	John Paul Erram (4)	Mall of Asia Arena	0–1

== Commissioner's Cup ==
=== Eliminations ===
==== Standings ====
Pos	Team	W	L	PCT	GB	Qualification
1	TNT KaTropa	10	1	.909	—	Twice-to-beat in the quarterfinals
2	NorthPort Batang Pier	9	2	.818	1	Twice-to-beat in the quarterfinals
3	Blackwater Elite	7	4	.636 (Note: Head-to-head record: Blackwater 1–0 Barangay Ginebra)	3	Best-of-three quarterfinals
4	Barangay Ginebra San Miguel	7	4	.636	3	Best-of-three quarterfinals
5	Magnolia Hotshots Pambansang Manok	5	6	.455 (Note: Head-to-head quotient: Magnolia 1.19, Rain or Shine 1.01, San Miguel 0.83)	5	Best-of-three quarterfinals
6	Rain or Shine Elasto Painters	5	6	.455	5	Best-of-three quarterfinals
7	San Miguel Beermen	5	6	.455	5	Twice-to-win in the quarterfinals
8	Alaska Aces	4	7	.364 (Note: Head-to-head quotient: Alaska 1.012, Meralco 1.011, Phoenix 0.977; 8th-seed playoff: Alaska 108–103 Meralco)	6	Twice-to-win in the quarterfinals
9	Meralco Bolts	4	7	.364	6	
10	Phoenix Pulse Fuel Masters	4	7	.364	6	
11	Columbian Dyip	3	8	.273 (Note: Head-to-head record: Columbian 1–0 NLEX)	7	
12	NLEX Road Warriors	3	8	.273	7	

Source: PBA.ph
Rules for classification: 1) winning percentage; 2) if two teams are tied, head-to-head record; if three or more teams are tied, head-to-head goal average (quotient), if tied for 8th, one-game playoff; 3) overall quotient 4) coin toss

==== Game log ====
2019 PBA Commissioner's Cup game log
Total: 3–8
May: 0–3

Game	Date	Opponent	Score	High points	High rebounds	High assists	Location Attendance	Record
1	May 22	TNT	L 87–102	Curtis Washington (18)	Curtis Washington (16)	Larry Fonacier (5)	Ynares Center	0–1
2	May 25	NorthPort	L 79–83	Kenneth Ighalo (18)	Marion Magat (10)	Lao, Paniamogan (3)	Smart Araneta Coliseum	0–2
3	May 29	Alaska	L 87–100	Tony Mitchell (34)	John Paul Erram (12)	Juami Tiongson (9)	Mall of Asia Arena	0–3

June: 2–4

Game	Date	Opponent	Score	High points	High rebounds	High assists	Location Attendance	Record
4	June 1	Columbian	L 105–120	Tony Mitchell (32)	Tony Mitchell (16)	Juami Tiongson (8)	Mall of Asia Arena	0–4
5	June 8	Blackwater	L 106–132	Tony Mitchell (27)	Tony Mitchell (11)	J. R. Quiñahan (6)	Ynares Center	0–5
6	June 14	Magnolia	L 88–98	Tony Mitchell (22)	Tony Mitchell (13)	Jericho Cruz (8)	Mall of Asia Arena	0–6
7	June 19	Meralco	W 100–91	Tony Mitchell (32)	Tony Mitchell (20)	Jericho Cruz (6)	Mall of Asia Arena	1–6
8	June 23	Barangay Ginebra	L 85–100	John Paul Erram (20)	John Paul Erram (14)	Galanza, Cruz (5)	Batangas City Coliseum	1–7
9	June 28	Rain or Shine	W 100–97	Olu Ashaolu (26)	Olu Ashaolu (13)	Ashaolu, Cruz (6)	Smart Araneta Coliseum	2–7

July: 1–1

Game	Date	Opponent	Score	High points	High rebounds	High assists	Location Attendance	Record
10	July 5	San Miguel	L 105–109	Olu Ashaolu (31)	Olu Ashaolu (15)	Juami Tiongson (6)	Mall of Asia Arena	2–8
11	July 12	Phoenix	W 87–85	Olu Ashaolu (17)	Olu Ashaolu (17)	Olu Ashaolu (5)	Cuneta Astrodome	3–8

== Governors' Cup ==
=== Eliminations ===
==== Standings ====
Pos	Team	W	L	PCT	GB	Qualification
1	NLEX Road Warriors	8	3	.727 (Note: Head-to-head quotient: NLEX 1.090, Meralco 0.959, TNT 0.958)	—	Twice-to-beat in quarterfinals
2	Meralco Bolts	8	3	.727	—	Twice-to-beat in quarterfinals
3	TNT KaTropa	8	3	.727	—	Twice-to-beat in quarterfinals
4	Barangay Ginebra San Miguel	7	4	.636	1	Twice-to-beat in quarterfinals
5	San Miguel Beermen	6	5	.545 (Note: Head-to-head record: San Miguel 1–0 Magnolia)	2	Twice-to-win in quarterfinals
6	Magnolia Hotshots Pambansang Manok	6	5	.545	2	Twice-to-win in quarterfinals
7	Alaska Aces	5	6	.455 (Note: Head-to-head record: Alaska 1–0 NorthPort)	3	Twice-to-win in quarterfinals
8	NorthPort Batang Pier	5	6	.455	3	Twice-to-win in quarterfinals
9	Rain or Shine Elasto Painters	4	7	.364 (Note: Head-to-head record: Rain or Shine 1–0 Columbian)	4	
10	Columbian Dyip	4	7	.364	4	
11	Phoenix Pulse Fuel Masters	3	8	.273	5	
12	Blackwater Elite	2	9	.182	6	

Source: PBA.ph
Rules for classification: 1) winning percentage; 2) if two teams are tied, head to head record; if three or more teams are tied, head-to-head goal average (quotient), if tied for 8th, one-game playoff; 3) overall quotient 4) coin toss>

==== Bracket ====
Quarterfinals (Top 4 twice-to-beat)
1	NLEX	90	123
8	NorthPort	115	126***
4	Barangay Ginebra	100
5	San Miguel	97
2	Meralco	94
7	Alaska	84
3	TNT	98
6	Magnolia	97

Semifinals (Best-of-5)
8	NorthPort	1
4	Barangay Ginebra	3
2	Meralco	3
3	TNT	2

Finals (Best-of-7)
4	Barangay Ginebra	4
2	Meralco	1

***Game went into triple overtime

== Transactions ==
=== Trades ===
==== Preseason ====
December
December 28, 2018	To NLEX John Paul Erram (from Blackwater); Philip Paredes (from TNT)	To Blackwater Abu Tratter (from NLEX); Paul Desiderio (from NLEX); Alfrancis Tamsi (from TNT); 2022 second round pick (from TNT)	To TNT Michael Miranda (from NLEX); 2022 second round pick (from San Miguel via Blackwater)

== Awards ==
Recipient	Award	Date awarded	Ref.
John Paul Erram	Philippine Cup Player of the Week	February 4, 2019	
Bong Galanza	Philippine Cup Player of the Week	March 18, 2019	
