= 2019 Alaska Aces season =

- Head coach: Alex Compton (resigned on August 22); Jeffrey Cariaso
- General manager: Dickie Bachmann
- Owner: Alaska Milk Corporation

Philippine Cup results
- Record: 4–7 (36.4%)
- Place: 8th
- Playoff finish: Quarterfinalist (lost to Phoenix with twice-to-win disadvantage)

Commissioner's Cup results
- Record: 4–7 (36.4%)
- Place: 8th
- Playoff finish: Quarterfinalists (lost to TNT with twice-to-win disadvantage)

Governors' Cup results
- Record: 5–6 (45.5%)
- Place: 7th
- Playoff finish: Quarterfinalist (lost to Meralco with twice-to-win disadvantage)

Alaska Aces seasons

The 2019 Alaska Aces season was the 33rd season of the franchise in the Philippine Basketball Association (PBA).

== Key dates ==
=== 2018 ===
- December 16: The 2018 PBA draft took place in Midtown Atrium, Robinson Place Manila.

== Draft picks ==
Round	Pick	Player	Position	Nationality	PBA D-League team	College
1	9	MJ Ayaay	G/F	Philippines	Zark's Jawbreakers - LPU	Lyceum
2	17	Gideon Babilonia	C	Philippines	Marinerong Pilipino	Ateneo

== Roster ==
2019 Alaska Aces roster
Players
Coaches

Pos.	#	POB	Name	Height	Weight	DOB (YYYY–MM–DD)	From
G	0	(United States)	Simon Enciso	5 ft 11 in (1.80 m)	185 lb (84 kg)	1991–02–12	Notre Dame de Namur
G/F	1	(United States)	Robbie Herndon	6 ft 3 in (1.91 m)	180 lb (82 kg)	1993–07–16	San Francisco State
F/C	2	(Philippines)	Abu Tratter	6 ft 6 in (1.98 m)	215 lb (98 kg)	1993–01–09	De La Salle
C	5	(Philippines)	Gideon Babilonia	6 ft 6 in (1.98 m)	205 lb (93 kg)	1995–06–12	Ateneo
C	7	(Papua New Guinea)	Sonny Thoss	6 ft 7 in (2.01 m)	205 lb (93 kg)	1981–12–07	James Cook
F/C	9	(Philippines)	Nonoy Baclao (injured)	6 ft 5 in (1.96 m)	190 lb (86 kg)	1987–06–15	Ateneo
G/F	10	(Philippines)	Jeron Teng	6 ft 3 in (1.91 m)	185 lb (84 kg)	1994–03–21	De La Salle
F	11	(Philippines)	Jake Pascual	6 ft 4 in (1.93 m)	200 lb (91 kg)	1988–11–11	San Beda
G	13	(United States)	Maverick Ahanmisi	6 ft 2 in (1.88 m)	185 lb (84 kg)	1991–07–17	Minnesota
G	23	(United States)	Abel Galliguez	5 ft 9 in (1.75 m)	175 lb (79 kg)	1990–04–14	John Brown
G/F	25	(Philippines)	Jesper Ayaay	6 ft 1 in (1.85 m)		–08–03	Lyceum
F/C	32	(Philippines)	Yutien Andrada	6 ft 5 in (1.96 m)	203 lb (92 kg)	1990–11–18	De La Salle
G	42	(Philippines)	JVee Casio (C)	5 ft 10 in (1.78 m)	175 lb (79 kg)	1986–09–01	De La Salle
F	61	(Philippines)	Kevin Racal	6 ft 3 in (1.91 m)	175 lb (79 kg)	1991–05–16	Letran
F	87	(Philippines)	Vic Manuel	6 ft 4 in (1.93 m)	201 lb (91 kg)	1987–06–18	PSBA
F	91	(Philippines)	Rodney Brondial	6 ft 5 in (1.96 m)	210 lb (95 kg)	1990–11–20	Adamson

Head coach

- (United States) Jeffrey Cariaso

Assistant coach(es)

- (Philippines) Franco Atienza
- (United States) Tony dela Cruz
- (Philippines) Monch Gavieres
- (Philippines) Danny Ildefonso

Team manager

- (Philippines) Richard Bachmann^{[a]}

Legend

- (C) Team captain
- (CI) Commissioner's Cup Import
- (GI) Governors' Cup Import
- (EI) EASL Import
- (DP) Unsigned draft pick
- (FA) Free agent
- (IN) Inactive
- (S) Suspended
- (R) Rookie
- Injured

Roster

- ^{a} also serves as Alaska's board governor.

== Philippine Cup ==
=== Eliminations ===
==== Standings ====
Pos	Team	W	L	PCT	GB	Qualification
1	Phoenix Pulse Fuel Masters	9	2	.818	—	Twice-to-beat in the quarterfinals
2	Rain or Shine Elasto Painters	8	3	.727	1	Twice-to-beat in the quarterfinals
3	Barangay Ginebra San Miguel	7	4	.636 (Note: Head-to-head quotient: Barangay Ginebra 1.02, TNT 1.00, San Miguel 0.98)	2	Best-of-three quarterfinals
4	TNT KaTropa	7	4	.636	2	Best-of-three quarterfinals
5	San Miguel Beermen	7	4	.636	2	Best-of-three quarterfinals
6	Magnolia Hotshots Pambansang Manok	6	5	.545	3	Best-of-three quarterfinals
7	NorthPort Batang Pier	5	6	.455	4	Twice-to-win in the quarterfinals
8	Alaska Aces	4	7	.364 (Note: Head-to-head quotient: NLEX 1.19, Alaska 1.01, Columbian 0.84; 8th-seed playoff: Alaska 88–80 NLEX)	5	Twice-to-win in the quarterfinals
9	NLEX Road Warriors	4	7	.364	5	
10	Columbian Dyip	4	7	.364	5	
11	Meralco Bolts	3	8	.273	6	
12	Blackwater Elite	2	9	.182	7	

Source: PBA.ph
Rules for classification: 1) winning percentage; 2) if two teams are tied, head-to-head record; if three or more teams are tied, head-to-head goal average (quotient), if tied for 8th, one-game playoff; 3) overall quotient 4) coin toss

==== Game log ====
2019 PBA Philippine Cup game log
Total: 4–7
February: 2–1

Game	Date	Opponent	Score	High points	High rebounds	High assists	Location Attendance	Record
1	February 3	Rain or Shine	L 72–85	Jeron Teng (15)	Jake Pascual (9)	Jeron Teng (3)	Mall of Asia Arena	0–1
2	February 6	Columbian	W 94–72	Carl Bryan Cruz (20)	Jake Pascual (13)	Baclao, Banchero (4)	Mall of Asia Arena	1–1
3	February 13	Blackwater	W 103–101	Cruz, Teng (18)	Chris Exciminiano (9)	Chris Banchero (16)	Mall of Asia Arena	2–1

March : 2–6

Game	Date	Opponent	Score	High points	High rebounds	High assists	Location Attendance	Record
4	March 1	Phoenix	L 80–94	Jeron Teng (23)	Jeron Teng (9)	Simon Enciso (8)	Mall of Asia Arena	2–2
5	March 3	Barangay Ginebra	W 104–78	Simon Enciso (23)	Ayaay, Teng (7)	Chris Banchero (8)	Ynares Center	3–2
6	March 9	Magnolia	L 86–103	Chris Banchero (26)	Jeron Teng (12)	Simon Enciso (5)	Ynares Center	3–3
7	March 13	NLEX	L 70–91	Jeron Teng (23)	Nonoy Baclao (10)	Ayaay, Banchero, Potts, Teng (2)	Smart Araneta Coliseum	3–4
8	March 15	TNT	L 78–92	Carl Bryan Cruz (19)	Jake Pascual (10)	Chris Banchero (4)	Cuneta Astrodome	3–5
9	March 20	Meralco	W 92–77	Jeron Teng (16)	Chris Banchero (11)	Banchero, Enciso, Teng, Thoss (3)	Smart Araneta Coliseum	4–5
10	March 24	San Miguel	L 96–114	Chris Banchero (22)	Jeron Teng (10)	Banchero, Enciso (5)	Smart Araneta Coliseum	4–6
11	March 27	NorthPort	L 84–94	Carl Bryan Cruz (23)	Sonny Thoss (10)	Simon Enciso (5)	Smart Araneta Coliseum	4–7

=== Playoffs ===
==== Bracket ====
Quarterfinals
(#1 twice-to-beat)
1	Phoenix	91
8	Alaska	76
(Best-of-3)
4	TNT	1
5	San Miguel	2
(#2 twice-to-beat)
2	Rain or Shine	91
7	NorthPort	85
(Best-of-3)
3	Barangay Ginebra	1
6	Magnolia	2

Semifinals (Best-of-7)
1	Phoenix	1
5	San Miguel	4
2	Rain or Shine	3
6	Magnolia	4

Finals (Best-of-7)
5	San Miguel	4
6	Magnolia	3

==== Game log ====
2019 PBA Philippine Cup playoffs game log
Total: 1–1
8th seed playoff: 1–0

Game	Date	Opponent	Score	High points	High rebounds	High assists	Location Attendance	Series
1	April 5	NLEX	W 88–80	Sonny Thoss (21)	Jeron Teng (7)	Simon Enciso (6)	Mall of Asia Arena	1–0

Quarterfinals: 0–1

Game	Date	Opponent	Score	High points	High rebounds	High assists	Location Attendance	Series
1	April 7	Phoenix	L 76–91	JVee Casio (19)	Nonoy Baclao (7)	Baclao, Cruz, Teng (2)	Mall of Asia Arena	0–1

== Commissioner's Cup ==
=== Eliminations ===
==== Standings ====
Pos	Team	W	L	PCT	GB	Qualification
1	TNT KaTropa	10	1	.909	—	Twice-to-beat in the quarterfinals
2	NorthPort Batang Pier	9	2	.818	1	Twice-to-beat in the quarterfinals
3	Blackwater Elite	7	4	.636 (Note: Head-to-head record: Blackwater 1–0 Barangay Ginebra)	3	Best-of-three quarterfinals
4	Barangay Ginebra San Miguel	7	4	.636	3	Best-of-three quarterfinals
5	Magnolia Hotshots Pambansang Manok	5	6	.455 (Note: Head-to-head quotient: Magnolia 1.19, Rain or Shine 1.01, San Miguel 0.83)	5	Best-of-three quarterfinals
6	Rain or Shine Elasto Painters	5	6	.455	5	Best-of-three quarterfinals
7	San Miguel Beermen	5	6	.455	5	Twice-to-win in the quarterfinals
8	Alaska Aces	4	7	.364 (Note: Head-to-head quotient: Alaska 1.012, Meralco 1.011, Phoenix 0.977; 8th-seed playoff: Alaska 108–103 Meralco)	6	Twice-to-win in the quarterfinals
9	Meralco Bolts	4	7	.364	6	
10	Phoenix Pulse Fuel Masters	4	7	.364	6	
11	Columbian Dyip	3	8	.273 (Note: Head-to-head record: Columbian 1–0 NLEX)	7	
12	NLEX Road Warriors	3	8	.273	7	

Source: PBA.ph
Rules for classification: 1) winning percentage; 2) if two teams are tied, head-to-head record; if three or more teams are tied, head-to-head goal average (quotient), if tied for 8th, one-game playoff; 3) overall quotient 4) coin toss

==== Game log ====
2019 PBA Commissioner's Cup game log
Total: 4–7
May: 2–2

Game	Date	Opponent	Score	High points	High rebounds	High assists	Location Attendance	Record
1	May 19	Columbian	W 111–98	Chris Daniels (25)	Chris Daniels (16)	Simon Enciso (8)	Mall of Asia Arena	1–0
2	May 22	NorthPort	L 81–103	Chris Daniels (21)	Chris Daniels (13)	Jeron Teng (4)	Ynares Center	1–1
3	May 25	TNT	L 85–99	Chris Daniels (23)	Chris Daniels (19)	Simon Enciso (6)	Smart Araneta Coliseum	1–2
4	May 29	NLEX	L 87–100	Jeron Teng (20)	Jeron Teng (15)	Banchero, Daniels, Enciso (5)	Mall of Asia Arena	2–2

June : 2–3

Game	Date	Opponent	Score	High points	High rebounds	High assists	Location Attendance	Record
5	June 5	Magnolia	W 103–80	Chris Daniels (23)	Jeron Teng (12)	Chris Banchero (11)	Smart Araneta Coliseum	3–2
6	June 9	Meralco	W 93–89	Chris Banchero (23)	Chris Banchero (9)	Banchero, Enciso (4)	Ynares Center	4–2
7	June 15	Phoenix	L 76–78	Chris Banchero (18)	Vic Manuel (7)	Chris Banchero (6)	Smart Araneta Coliseum	4–3
8	June 21	San Miguel	L 107–119	Chris Banchero (26)	Chris Daniels (22)	Chris Banchero (6)	Cuneta Astrodome	4–4
9	June 30	Barangay Ginebra	L 106–118	Chris Banchero (29)	Diamon Simpson (22)	Simon Enciso (5)	Smart Araneta Coliseum	4–5

July : 0–2

Game	Date	Opponent	Score	High points	High rebounds	High assists	Location Attendance	Record
10	July 6	Rain or Shine	L 84–86	Chris Banchero (24)	Diamon Simpson (23)	Chris Banchero (9)	Mall of Asia Arena	4–6
11	July 14	Blackwater	L 104–112	Diamon Simpson (24)	Diamon Simpson (16)	Diamon Simpson (8)	Smart Araneta Coliseum	4–7

=== Playoffs ===
==== Bracket ====
Quarterfinals
(#1 twice-to-beat)
1	TNT	72	104
8	Alaska	108	93
(Best-of-3)
4	Barangay Ginebra	2
5	Magnolia	0
(#2 twice-to-beat)
2	NorthPort	84	88
7	San Miguel	98	90
(Best-of-3)
3	Blackwater	1
6	Rain or Shine	2

Semifinals (Best-of-5)
1	TNT	3
4	Barangay Ginebra	1
7	San Miguel	3
6	Rain or Shine	1

Finals (Best-of-7)
1	TNT	2
7	San Miguel	4

==== Game log ====
2019 PBA Commissioner's Cup playoffs game log
Total: 1–1
Quarterfinals: 1–1

Game	Date	Opponent	Score	High points	High rebounds	High assists	Location Attendance	Series
1	July 21	TNT	W 108–72	Simpson, Teng (15)	Diamon Simpson (19)	Simon Enciso (5)	Smart Araneta Coliseum	1–0
2	July 24	TNT	L 93–104	Simon Enciso (24)	Diamon Simpson (16)	Chris Banchero (9)	Smart Araneta Coliseum	1–1

== Governors' Cup ==
=== Eliminations ===
==== Standings ====
Pos	Team	W	L	PCT	GB	Qualification
1	NLEX Road Warriors	8	3	.727 (Note: Head-to-head quotient: NLEX 1.090, Meralco 0.959, TNT 0.958)	—	Twice-to-beat in quarterfinals
2	Meralco Bolts	8	3	.727	—	Twice-to-beat in quarterfinals
3	TNT KaTropa	8	3	.727	—	Twice-to-beat in quarterfinals
4	Barangay Ginebra San Miguel	7	4	.636	1	Twice-to-beat in quarterfinals
5	San Miguel Beermen	6	5	.545 (Note: Head-to-head record: San Miguel 1–0 Magnolia)	2	Twice-to-win in quarterfinals
6	Magnolia Hotshots Pambansang Manok	6	5	.545	2	Twice-to-win in quarterfinals
7	Alaska Aces	5	6	.455 (Note: Head-to-head record: Alaska 1–0 NorthPort)	3	Twice-to-win in quarterfinals
8	NorthPort Batang Pier	5	6	.455	3	Twice-to-win in quarterfinals
9	Rain or Shine Elasto Painters	4	7	.364 (Note: Head-to-head record: Rain or Shine 1–0 Columbian)	4	
10	Columbian Dyip	4	7	.364	4	
11	Phoenix Pulse Fuel Masters	3	8	.273	5	
12	Blackwater Elite	2	9	.182	6	

Source: PBA.ph
Rules for classification: 1) winning percentage; 2) if two teams are tied, head to head record; if three or more teams are tied, head-to-head goal average (quotient), if tied for 8th, one-game playoff; 3) overall quotient 4) coin toss>

==== Game log ====
2019 PBA Governors' Cup game log
Total: 5–6
September: 0–3

Game	Date	Opponent	Score	High points	High rebounds	High assists	Location Attendance	Record
1	September 20	Columbian	L 110–117	Justin Watts (40)	Justin Watts (14)	Enciso, Watts (4)	Mall of Asia Arena	0–1
2	September 22	Barangay Ginebra	L 83–102	Justin Watts (22)	Justin Watts (12)	Simon Enciso (3)	Smart Araneta Coliseum	0–2
3	September 29	San Miguel	L 83–109	JVee Casio (16)	Chris Banchero (11)	Chris Banchero (5)	Sta. Rosa Multi-Purpose Complex	0–3

October: 2–3

Game	Date	Opponent	Score	High points	High rebounds	High assists	Location Attendance	Record
4	October 4	Meralco	L 75–101	Banchero, Enciso (12)	Franko House (11)	Franko House (6)	Mall of Asia Arena	0–4
5	October 6	Magnolia	L 90–95	Vic Manuel (22)	Franko House (13)	Chris Banchero (6)	Smart Araneta Coliseum	0–5
6	October 13	Rain or Shine	W 78–71	Franko House (22)	Franko House (23)	Chris Banchero (6)	Smart Araneta Coliseum	1–5
7	October 18	TNT	L 93–99 (OT)	Casio, House (16)	Franko House (13)	Casio, Banchero (4)	Ynares Center	1–6
8	October 26	Blackwater	L 101–91	Jeron Teng (19)	Franko House (11)	Chris Banchero (7)	Smart Araneta Coliseum	2–6

November: 3–0

Game	Date	Opponent	Score	High points	High rebounds	High assists	Location Attendance	Record
9	November 3	NorthPort	W 106–99	House, Manuel (23)	Franko House (11)	Simon Enciso (8)	Smart Araneta Coliseum	3–6
10	November 13	Phoenix	W 105–102	Vic Manuel (20)	Franko House (18)	Simon Enciso (7)	Smart Araneta Coliseum	4–6
11	November 20	NLEX	W 106–90	Franko House (24)	Franko House (8)	Franko House (5)	Ynares Center	5–6

=== Playoffs ===
==== Bracket ====
Quarterfinals (Top 4 twice-to-beat)
1	NLEX	90	123
8	NorthPort	115	126***
4	Barangay Ginebra	100
5	San Miguel	97
2	Meralco	94
7	Alaska	84
3	TNT	98
6	Magnolia	97

Semifinals (Best-of-5)
8	NorthPort	1
4	Barangay Ginebra	3
2	Meralco	3
3	TNT	2

Finals (Best-of-7)
4	Barangay Ginebra	4
2	Meralco	1

***Game went into triple overtime
