= 2019 San Miguel Beermen season =

- Head coach: Leo Austria
- Owner(s): San Miguel Brewery, Inc. (a San Miguel Corporation subsidiary)

Philippine Cup results
- Record: 7–4 (63.6%)
- Place: 5th
- Playoff finish: Champions (Defeated Magnolia, 4–3)

Commissioner's Cup results
- Record: 5–6 (45.5%)
- Place: 7th
- Playoff finish: Champions (Defeated TNT, 4–2)

Governors' Cup results
- Record: 6–5 (54.5%)
- Place: 5th
- Playoff finish: Quarterfinalist (lost to Barangay Ginebra with twice-to-win disadvantage)

San Miguel Beermen seasons

The 2019 San Miguel Beermen season was the 44th season of the franchise in the Philippine Basketball Association (PBA).

== Key dates ==
=== 2018 ===
- December 16: The 2018 PBA draft took place in Midtown Atrium, Robinson Place Manila.

== Draft picks ==
Round	Pick	Player	Position	Nationality	PBA D-League team	College
3	31	Ryan Monteclaro	G	Philippines	Boracay Rum	Adamson

== Roster ==
2019 San Miguel Beermen roster
Players
Coaches

Pos.	#	POB	Name	Height	Weight	DOB (YYYY–MM–DD)	From
F/C	2	(Philippines)	Billy Mamaril	6 ft 6 in (1.98 m)	225 lb (102 kg)	1980–06–25	Bakersfield
G/F	3	(Philippines)	Von Pessumal	6 ft 2 in (1.88 m)	185 lb (84 kg)	1993–02–12	Ateneo
G	5	(Philippines)	Alex Cabagnot	6 ft 0 in (1.83 m)	185 lb (84 kg)	1982–12–08	Hawaiʻi–Hilo
G	6	(United States)	Chris Ross	6 ft 2 in (1.88 m)	180 lb (82 kg)	1985–03–09	Marshall
G	7	(Philippines)	Terrence Romeo	5 ft 11 in (1.80 m)	178 lb (81 kg)	1992–03–16	Far Eastern
G	12	(Philippines)	Paul Zamar	5 ft 10 in (1.78 m)	179 lb (81 kg)	1987–10–20	UE
G/F	13	(United States)	Marcio Lassiter	6 ft 2 in (1.88 m)	185 lb (84 kg)	1987–05–16	Cal State Fullerton
C	15	(Philippines)	June Mar Fajardo	6 ft 11 in (2.11 m)	268 lb (122 kg)	1989–11–17	Cebu
G	18	(Philippines)	Louie Vigil	6 ft 3 in (1.91 m)		1991–09–26	UST
G/F	22	(Philippines)	Matt Ganuelas-Rosser	6 ft 5 in (1.96 m)	186 lb (84 kg)	1990–06–13	Cal Poly Pomona
G	26	(Philippines)	Chico Lanete	6 ft 0 in (1.83 m)	180 lb (82 kg)	1979–08–01	Lyceum
F	29	(Philippines)	Arwind Santos (C / S)	6 ft 4 in (1.93 m)	175 lb (79 kg)	1981–06–10	Far Eastern
F/C	30	(United States)	Kelly Nabong (S)	6 ft 6 in (1.98 m)	227 lb (103 kg)	1988–11–17	SRJC
F/C	33	(United States)	Moala Tautuaa	6 ft 8 in (2.03 m)	245 lb (111 kg)	1989–04–30	Chadron State
G/F	71	(Philippines)	Ronald Tubid (S)	6 ft 1 in (1.85 m)	185 lb (84 kg)	1981–10–15	UE
C	95	(Philippines)	Yancy de Ocampo	6 ft 9 in (2.06 m)	245 lb (111 kg)	1980–03–11	Saint Francis of Assisi

Head coach

- (Philippines) Leo Austria

Assistant coach(es)

- (Philippines) Peter Martin (1st assistant)
- (Philippines) Ato Agustin
- (United States) Jimmy Alapag
- (Philippines) Jorge Gallent
- (Philippines) Dayong Mendoza
- (Philippines) Biboy Ravanes
- (Philippines) Boyzie Zamar

Team manager

- (Philippines) Gee Abanilla
- (Philippines) Daniel Henares (assistant)

Legend

- (C) Team captain
- (CI) Commissioner's Cup Import
- (GI) Governors' Cup Import
- (EI) EASL Import
- (DP) Unsigned draft pick
- (FA) Free agent
- (IN) Inactive
- (S) Suspended
- (R) Rookie
- Injured

Roster

== Philippine Cup ==
=== Eliminations ===
==== Standings ====
Pos	Team	W	L	PCT	GB	Qualification
1	Phoenix Pulse Fuel Masters	9	2	.818	—	Twice-to-beat in the quarterfinals
2	Rain or Shine Elasto Painters	8	3	.727	1	Twice-to-beat in the quarterfinals
3	Barangay Ginebra San Miguel	7	4	.636 (Note: Head-to-head quotient: Barangay Ginebra 1.02, TNT 1.00, San Miguel 0.98)	2	Best-of-three quarterfinals
4	TNT KaTropa	7	4	.636	2	Best-of-three quarterfinals
5	San Miguel Beermen	7	4	.636	2	Best-of-three quarterfinals
6	Magnolia Hotshots Pambansang Manok	6	5	.545	3	Best-of-three quarterfinals
7	NorthPort Batang Pier	5	6	.455	4	Twice-to-win in the quarterfinals
8	Alaska Aces	4	7	.364 (Note: Head-to-head quotient: NLEX 1.19, Alaska 1.01, Columbian 0.84; 8th-seed playoff: Alaska 88–80 NLEX)	5	Twice-to-win in the quarterfinals
9	NLEX Road Warriors	4	7	.364	5	
10	Columbian Dyip	4	7	.364	5	
11	Meralco Bolts	3	8	.273	6	
12	Blackwater Elite	2	9	.182	7	

Source: PBA.ph
Rules for classification: 1) winning percentage; 2) if two teams are tied, head-to-head record; if three or more teams are tied, head-to-head goal average (quotient), if tied for 8th, one-game playoff; 3) overall quotient 4) coin toss

==== Game log ====
2019 PBA Philippine Cup game log
Total: 7–4
January: 2–2

Game	Date	Opponent	Score	High points	High rebounds	High assists	Location Attendance	Record
1	January 18	Columbian	L 118–124	Arwind Santos (34)	June Mar Fajardo (13)	Alex Cabagnot (12)	Cuneta Astrodome	0–1
2	January 20	Barangay Ginebra	W 99–91	Christian Standhardinger (26)	June Mar Fajardo (11)	Chris Ross (8)	Smart Araneta Coliseum	1–1
3	January 25	Meralco	W 105–93	Marcio Lassiter (25)	June Mar Fajardo (11)	Chris Ross (8)	Ynares Center	2–1
4	January 27	TNT	L 93–104	Christian Standhardinger (24)	Christian Standhardinger (10)	Chris Ross (15)	Smart Araneta Coliseum	2–2

February: 2–1

Game	Date	Opponent	Score	High points	High rebounds	High assists	Location Attendance	Record
5	February 1	Rain or Shine	L 98–108	Marcio Lassiter (27)	June Mar Fajardo (14)	Chris Ross (11)	Ynares Center	2–3
6	February 6	Blackwater	W 93–79	June Mar Fajardo (20)	June Mar Fajardo (21)	Chris Ross (6)	Mall of Asia Arena	3–3
7	February 10	Magnolia	W 113–92	Arwind Santos (29)	June Mar Fajardo (8)	Cabagnot, Lassiter (4)	Smart Araneta Coliseum	4–3

March: 3–1

Game	Date	Opponent	Score	High points	High rebounds	High assists	Location Attendance	Record
8	March 8	NLEX	W 121–111	June Mar Fajardo (27)	June Mar Fajardo (13)	Chris Ross (7)	Smart Araneta Coliseum	5–3
9	March 10	NorthPort	W 113–107	June Mar Fajardo (40)	June Mar Fajardo (19)	Chris Ross (7)	Smart Araneta Coliseum	6–3
10	March 16	Phoenix Pulse	L 93–96	June Mar Fajardo (29)	June Mar Fajardo (12)	Chris Ross (4)	Panabo Multi-Purpose Tourism, Cultural, and Sports Center	6–4
11	March 24	Alaska	W 114–96	Alex Cabagnot (31)	June Mar Fajardo (10)	Chris Ross (14)	Smart Araneta Coliseum	7–4

=== Playoffs ===
==== Bracket ====
Quarterfinals
(#1 twice-to-beat)
1	Phoenix	91
8	Alaska	76
(Best-of-3)
4	TNT	1
5	San Miguel	2
(#2 twice-to-beat)
2	Rain or Shine	91
7	NorthPort	85
(Best-of-3)
3	Barangay Ginebra	1
6	Magnolia	2

Semifinals (Best-of-7)
1	Phoenix	1
5	San Miguel	4
2	Rain or Shine	3
6	Magnolia	4

Finals (Best-of-7)
5	San Miguel	4
6	Magnolia	3

==== Game log ====
2019 PBA Philippine Cup playoffs game log
Total: 11–5
Quarterfinals: 2–1

Game	Date	Opponent	Score	High points	High rebounds	High assists	Location Attendance	Series
1	April 6	TNT	W 80–78	Fajardo, Lassiter, Romeo (15)	Fajardo, Standhardinger (10)	Chris Ross (6)	Mall of Asia Arena	1–0
2	April 8	TNT	L 88–93	June Mar Fajardo (26)	June Mar Fajardo (19)	Chris Ross (6)	Smart Araneta Coliseum	1–1
3	April 10	TNT	W 96–86	June Mar Fajardo (32)	June Mar Fajardo (14)	Marcio Lassiter (6)	Smart Araneta Coliseum; 11,147	2–1

Semifinals: 4–1

Game	Date	Opponent	Score	High points	High rebounds	High assists	Location Attendance	Series
1	April 13	Phoenix Pulse	W 100–88	Alex Cabagnot (26)	Christian Standhardinger (16)	Alex Cabagnot (7)	Mall of Asia Arena	1–0
2	April 15	Phoenix Pulse	W 92–82	Marcio Lassiter (24)	June Mar Fajardo (18)	June Mar Fajardo (4)	Smart Araneta Coliseum	2–0
3	April 21	Phoenix Pulse	L 90–92	June Mar Fajardo (22)	June Mar Fajardo (19)	Alex Cabagnot (6)	Smart Araneta Coliseum	2–1
4	April 23	Phoenix Pulse	W 114–91	Alex Cabagnot (18)	Arwind Santos (8)	Ganuelas-Rosser, Ross (7)	Cuneta Astrodome	3–1
5	April 25	Phoenix Pulse	W 105–94	Chris Ross (24)	June Mar Fajardo (16)	Alex Cabagnot (7)	Cuneta Astrodome	4–1

Finals: 4–3

Game	Date	Opponent	Score	High points	High rebounds	High assists	Location Attendance	Series
1	May 1	Magnolia	L 94–99	June Mar Fajardo (35)	June Mar Fajardo (21)	Ross, Santos (5)	Smart Araneta Coliseum	0–1
2	May 3	Magnolia	W 108–101	Cabagnot, Fajardo (16)	June Mar Fajardo (14)	Alex Cabagnot (6)	Smart Araneta Coliseum	1–1
3	May 5	Magnolia	L 82–86	Arwind Santos (19)	June Mar Fajardo (14)	Chris Ross (7)	Smart Araneta Coliseum	1–2
3	May 5	Magnolia	L 82–86	Arwind Santos (19)	June Mar Fajardo (14)	Chris Ross (7)	Smart Araneta Coliseum	1–2
4	May 8	Magnolia	W 114–98	June Mar Fajardo (31)	Fajardo, Standhardinger (14)	Arwind Santos (6)	Smart Araneta Coliseum	2–2
5	May 10	Magnolia	L 86–88	June Mar Fajardo (21)	June Mar Fajardo (22)	Fajardo, Ross (4)	Smart Araneta Coliseum	2–3
6	May 12	Magnolia	W 98–86	June Mar Fajardo (23)	June Mar Fajardo (18)	Romeo, Ross (6)	Smart Araneta Coliseum	3–3
7	May 15	Magnolia	W 72–71	Alex Cabagnot (18)	June Mar Fajardo (31)	Cabagnot, Lassiter, Romeo (3)	Smart Araneta Coliseum	4–3

== Commissioner's Cup ==
=== Eliminations ===
==== Standings ====
Pos	Team	W	L	PCT	GB	Qualification
1	TNT KaTropa	10	1	.909	—	Twice-to-beat in the quarterfinals
2	NorthPort Batang Pier	9	2	.818	1	Twice-to-beat in the quarterfinals
3	Blackwater Elite	7	4	.636 (Note: Head-to-head record: Blackwater 1–0 Barangay Ginebra)	3	Best-of-three quarterfinals
4	Barangay Ginebra San Miguel	7	4	.636	3	Best-of-three quarterfinals
5	Magnolia Hotshots Pambansang Manok	5	6	.455 (Note: Head-to-head quotient: Magnolia 1.19, Rain or Shine 1.01, San Miguel 0.83)	5	Best-of-three quarterfinals
6	Rain or Shine Elasto Painters	5	6	.455	5	Best-of-three quarterfinals
7	San Miguel Beermen	5	6	.455	5	Twice-to-win in the quarterfinals
8	Alaska Aces	4	7	.364 (Note: Head-to-head quotient: Alaska 1.012, Meralco 1.011, Phoenix 0.977; 8th-seed playoff: Alaska 108–103 Meralco)	6	Twice-to-win in the quarterfinals
9	Meralco Bolts	4	7	.364	6	
10	Phoenix Pulse Fuel Masters	4	7	.364	6	
11	Columbian Dyip	3	8	.273 (Note: Head-to-head record: Columbian 1–0 NLEX)	7	
12	NLEX Road Warriors	3	8	.273	7	

Source: PBA.ph
Rules for classification: 1) winning percentage; 2) if two teams are tied, head-to-head record; if three or more teams are tied, head-to-head goal average (quotient), if tied for 8th, one-game playoff; 3) overall quotient 4) coin toss

==== Game log ====
2019 PBA Commissioner's Cup game log
Total: 5–6
June: 2–5

Game	Date	Opponent	Score	High points	High rebounds	High assists	Location Attendance	Record
1	June 5	NorthPort	L 88–121	Charles Rhodes (27)	Charles Rhodes (12)	Alex Cabagnot (6)	Smart Araneta Coliseum	0–1
2	June 8	TNT	L 97–110	Von Pessumal (24)	June Mar Fajardo (13)	Chris Ross (8)	Ynares Center	0–2
3	June 14	Blackwater	W 127–106	Charles Rhodes (32)	Charles Rhodes (19)	Cabagnot, Ross (6)	Mall of Asia Arena	1–2
4	June 16	Barangay Ginebra	L 107–110 (OT)	Charles Rhodes (34)	June Mar Fajardo (19)	Chris Ross (11)	Smart Araneta Coliseum	1–3
5	June 21	Alaska	W 119–107	Alex Cabagnot (31)	Charles Rhodes (11)	Marcio Lassiter (7)	Cuneta Astrodome	2–3
6	June 26	Magnolia	L 82–118	Charles Rhodes (20)	Charles Rhodes (15)	Cabagnot, Lassiter (4)	Smart Araneta Coliseum	2–4
7	June 30	Columbian	L 132–134 (OT)	Charles Rhodes (26)	Charles Rhodes (16)	Chris Ross (6)	Smart Araneta Coliseum	2–5

July : 3–1

Game	Date	Opponent	Score	High points	High rebounds	High assists	Location Attendance	Record
8	July 5	NLEX	W 109–105	Chris McCullough (47)	Chris McCullough (10)	Marcio Lassiter (6)	Mall of Asia Arena	3–5
9	July 10	Phoenix	W 128–108	Chris McCullough (37)	June Mar Fajardo (14)	Chris Ross (7)	Smart Araneta Coliseum	4–5
10	July 13	Rain or Shine	W 89–87	Chris McCullough (24)	Chris McCullough (17)	Chris McCullough (4)	Xavier University Gym	5–5
11	July 17	Meralco	L 91–95	Fajardo, McCullough (27)	Chris McCullough (16)	Chris Ross (7)	Smart Araneta Coliseum	5–6

=== Playoffs ===
==== Bracket ====
Quarterfinals
(#1 twice-to-beat)
1	TNT	72	104
8	Alaska	108	93
(Best-of-3)
4	Barangay Ginebra	2
5	Magnolia	0
(#2 twice-to-beat)
2	NorthPort	84	88
7	San Miguel	98	90
(Best-of-3)
3	Blackwater	1
6	Rain or Shine	2

Semifinals (Best-of-5)
1	TNT	3
4	Barangay Ginebra	1
7	San Miguel	3
6	Rain or Shine	1

Finals (Best-of-7)
1	TNT	2
7	San Miguel	4

==== Game log ====
2019 PBA Commissioner's Cup playoffs game log
Total: 9–3
Quarterfinals: 2–0

Game	Date	Opponent	Score	High points	High rebounds	High assists	Location Attendance	Series
1	July 21	NorthPort	W 98–84	Chris McCullough (24)	June Mar Fajardo (19)	Lassiter, McCullough (4)	Smart Araneta Coliseum	1–0
2	July 24	NorthPort	W 90–88	Chris McCullough (31)	Chris McCullough (11)	Chris Ross (7)	Smart Araneta Coliseum	2–0

Semifinals: 3–1

Game	Date	Opponent	Score	High points	High rebounds	High assists	Location Attendance	Series
1	July 27	Rain or Shine	W 111–105	Chris McCullough (32)	Chris McCullough (14)	Alex Cabagnot (7)	Smart Araneta Coliseum	1–0
2	July 29	Rain or Shine	W 117–105	Chris Ross (34)	June Mar Fajardo (15)	Chris Ross (8)	Mall of Asia Arena	2–0
3	July 31	Rain or Shine	L 104–112	Chris McCullough (51)	Chris McCullough (14)	Chris Ross (7)	Smart Araneta Coliseum	2–1
4	August 2	Rain or Shine	W 98–95	Chris McCullough (35)	Chris McCullough (18)	Chris Ross (8)	Smart Araneta Coliseum	3–1

Finals: 4–2

Game	Date	Opponent	Score	High points	High rebounds	High assists	Location Attendance	Series
1	August 4	TNT	L 96–109	Chris McCullough (33)	Chris McCullough (15)	Chris Ross (7)	Smart Araneta Coliseum	0–1
2	August 7	TNT	W 127–125 (2OT)	Chris McCullough (32)	Chris McCullough (22)	Cabagnot, McCullough (7)	Smart Araneta Coliseum	1–1
3	August 9	TNT	L 105–115	Fajardo, McCullough (27)	Fajardo, McCullough (13)	Romeo, Ross (5)	Smart Araneta Coliseum	1–2
4	August 11	TNT	W 106–101	Chris McCullough (27)	Chris McCullough (22)	Chris Ross (8)	Smart Araneta Coliseum	2–2
5	August 14	TNT	W 99–94	Chris McCullough (35)	Chris McCullough (22)	Terrence Romeo (5)	Smart Araneta Coliseum	3–2
6	August 16	TNT	W 102–90	Chris McCullough (35)	Fajardo, McCullough (13)	Romeo, Ross (7)	Smart Araneta Coliseum	4–2

== Governors' Cup ==
=== Eliminations ===
==== Standings ====
Pos	Team	W	L	PCT	GB	Qualification
1	NLEX Road Warriors	8	3	.727 (Note: Head-to-head quotient: NLEX 1.090, Meralco 0.959, TNT 0.958)	—	Twice-to-beat in quarterfinals
2	Meralco Bolts	8	3	.727	—	Twice-to-beat in quarterfinals
3	TNT KaTropa	8	3	.727	—	Twice-to-beat in quarterfinals
4	Barangay Ginebra San Miguel	7	4	.636	1	Twice-to-beat in quarterfinals
5	San Miguel Beermen	6	5	.545 (Note: Head-to-head record: San Miguel 1–0 Magnolia)	2	Twice-to-win in quarterfinals
6	Magnolia Hotshots Pambansang Manok	6	5	.545	2	Twice-to-win in quarterfinals
7	Alaska Aces	5	6	.455 (Note: Head-to-head record: Alaska 1–0 NorthPort)	3	Twice-to-win in quarterfinals
8	NorthPort Batang Pier	5	6	.455	3	Twice-to-win in quarterfinals
9	Rain or Shine Elasto Painters	4	7	.364 (Note: Head-to-head record: Rain or Shine 1–0 Columbian)	4	
10	Kia Picanto	4	7	.364	4	
11	Phoenix Pulse Fuel Masters	3	8	.273	5	
12	Blackwater Elite	2	9	.182	6	

Source: PBA.ph
Rules for classification: 1) winning percentage; 2) if two teams are tied, head to head record; if three or more teams are tied, head-to-head goal average (quotient), if tied for 8th, one-game playoff; 3) overall quotient 4) coin toss>

==== Bracket ====
Quarterfinals (Top 4 twice-to-beat)
1	NLEX	90	123
8	NorthPort	115	126***
4	Barangay Ginebra	100
5	San Miguel	97
2	Meralco	94
7	Alaska	84
3	TNT	98
6	Magnolia	97

Semifinals (Best-of-5)
8	NorthPort	1
4	Barangay Ginebra	3
2	Meralco	3
3	TNT	2

Finals (Best-of-7)
4	Barangay Ginebra	4
2	Meralco	1

***Game went into triple overtime

== Transactions ==
=== Trades ===
==== Preseason ====
December
December 19, 2018	To San Miguel Terrence Romeo	To TNT Brian Heruela; David Semerad; 2021 first round pick
December 19, 2018	To San Miguel Paul Zamar	To Blackwater Elite 2021 & 2022 second round picks
December 19, 2018	To San Miguel Ronald Tubid	To Columbian Dyip Keith Agovida

== Awards ==
Recipient	Award	Date awarded	Ref.
June Mar Fajardo	Philippine Cup Player of the Week	March 11, 2019	
