= 2019 Barangay Ginebra San Miguel season =

- Head coach: Tim Cone
- Owners: Ginebra San Miguel, Inc. (a San Miguel Corporation subsidiary)

Philippine Cup results
- Record: 7–4 (63.6%)
- Place: 3rd
- Playoff finish: Quarterfinalist (lost to Magnolia, 1–2)

Commissioner's Cup results
- Record: 7–4 (63.6%)
- Place: 4th
- Playoff finish: Semifinalist (lost to TNT, 1–3)

Governors' Cup results
- Record: 7–4 (63.6%)
- Place: 4th
- Playoff finish: Champions (Defeated Meralco, 4–1)

Barangay Ginebra San Miguel seasons

The 2019 Barangay Ginebra San Miguel season was the 40th season of the franchise in the Philippine Basketball Association (PBA).

== Key dates ==
=== 2018 ===
- December 16: The 2018 PBA draft took place in Midtown Atrium, Robinson Place Manila.

=== 2019 ===
- January 4: Jett Manuel officially announced his retirement after playing one season in the PBA for the Barangay Ginebra San Miguel franchise.

== Draft picks ==
Round	Pick	Player	Position	Nationality	PBA D-League team	College
3	32	Matt Salem	F	United States	Go for Gold	National U

== Roster ==
2019 Barangay Ginebra San Miguel roster
Players
Coaches

Pos.	#	POB	Name	Height	Weight	DOB (YYYY–MM–DD)	From
F	2	(United States)	Jared Dillinger	6 ft 4 in (1.93 m)	220 lb (100 kg)	1984–01–06	Hawaiʻi
G	5	(Philippines)	LA Tenorio	5 ft 8 in (1.73 m)	151 lb (68 kg)	1984–07–09	Ateneo
G	6	(Philippines)	Scottie Thompson	6 ft 1 in (1.85 m)	180 lb (82 kg)	1993–07–12	UPHSD
G/F	10	(United States)	Julian Sargent	6 ft 3 in (1.91 m)	205 lb (93 kg)	1991–07–15	La Salle
G	11	(United States)	Stanley Pringle	6 ft 1 in (1.85 m)	190 lb (86 kg)	1987–03–05	Penn State
F/C	12	(Philippines)	Prince Caperal	6 ft 7 in (2.01 m)	230 lb (104 kg)	1993–06–12	Arellano
G	14	(Philippines)	Teytey Teodoro (R)	5 ft 9 in (1.75 m)		1993–08–21	José Rizal
G/F	16	(Philippines)	Jeff Chan	6 ft 2 in (1.88 m)	185 lb (84 kg)	1983–02–11	Far Eastern
F	18	(Philippines)	Arthur dela Cruz	6 ft 4 in (1.93 m)	210 lb (95 kg)	1992–05–09	San Beda
C	20	(United States)	Greg Slaughter	7 ft 0 in (2.13 m)	258 lb (117 kg)	1988–05–19	Ateneo
F/C	23	(Philippines)	Raymond Aguilar	6 ft 4 in (1.93 m)	200 lb (91 kg)	1985–07–27	National-U
F/C	25	(Philippines)	Japeth Aguilar	6 ft 9 in (2.06 m)	235 lb (107 kg)	1987–01–25	Western Kentucky
F	31	(Philippines)	Aljon Mariano	6 ft 3 in (1.91 m)	175 lb (79 kg)	1992–08–03	UST
F	38	(United States)	Joe Devance	6 ft 7 in (2.01 m)	225 lb (102 kg)	1982–02–19	UTEP
G	47	(Philippines)	Mark Caguioa	6 ft 1 in (1.85 m)	185 lb (84 kg)	1979–11–19	Glendale CC (CA)
F	32	(United States)	Justin Brownlee (CI / GI)	6 ft 6 in (1.98 m)	220 lb (100 kg)	1988–04–23	St. John's

Head coach

- (United States) Tim Cone

Assistant coach(es)

- (Philippines) Richard del Rosario (1st assistant)
- (Philippines) Freddie Abuda
- (United States) Kirk Collier
- (Philippines) Olsen Racela

Team manager

- (Philippines) Alfrancis Chua^{[a]}
- (Philippines) Raymond Rodriguez (Assistant)

Legend

- (C) Team captain
- (CI) Commissioner's Cup Import
- (GI) Governors' Cup Import
- (EI) EASL Import
- (DP) Unsigned draft pick
- (FA) Free agent
- (IN) Inactive
- (S) Suspended
- (R) Rookie
- Injured

Roster

- ^{a} Also serves as Barangay Ginebra's board governor.

== Philippine Cup ==
=== Eliminations ===
==== Standings ====
Pos	Team	W	L	PCT	GB	Qualification
1	Phoenix Pulse Fuel Masters	9	2	.818	—	Twice-to-beat in the quarterfinals
2	Rain or Shine Elasto Painters	8	3	.727	1	Twice-to-beat in the quarterfinals
3	Barangay Ginebra San Miguel	7	4	.636 (Note: Head-to-head quotient: Barangay Ginebra 1.02, TNT 1.00, San Miguel 0.98)	2	Best-of-three quarterfinals
4	TNT KaTropa	7	4	.636	2	Best-of-three quarterfinals
5	San Miguel Beermen	7	4	.636	2	Best-of-three quarterfinals
6	Magnolia Hotshots Pambansang Manok	6	5	.545	3	Best-of-three quarterfinals
7	NorthPort Batang Pier	5	6	.455	4	Twice-to-win in the quarterfinals
8	Alaska Aces	4	7	.364 (Note: Head-to-head quotient: NLEX 1.19, Alaska 1.01, Columbian 0.84; 8th-seed playoff: Alaska 88–80 NLEX)	5	Twice-to-win in the quarterfinals
9	NLEX Road Warriors	4	7	.364	5	
10	Columbian Dyip	4	7	.364	5	
11	Meralco Bolts	3	8	.273	6	
12	Blackwater Elite	2	9	.182	7	

Source: PBA.ph
Rules for classification: 1) winning percentage; 2) if two teams are tied, head-to-head record; if three or more teams are tied, head-to-head goal average (quotient), if tied for 8th, one-game playoff; 3) overall quotient 4) coin toss

==== Game log ====
2019 PBA Philippine Cup game log
Total: 7–4
January: 1–2

Game	Date	Opponent	Score	High points	High rebounds	High assists	Location Attendance	Record
1	January 13	TNT	W 90–79	Japeth Aguilar (21)	Scottie Thompson (10)	LA Tenorio (7)	Philippine Arena; 23,711	1–0
2	January 20	San Miguel	L 91–99	LA Tenorio (24)	Greg Slaughter (10)	LA Tenorio (5)	Smart Araneta Coliseum	1–1
3	January 26	Rain or Shine	L 80–83	Japeth Aguilar (19)	Greg Slaughter (12)	LA Tenorio (4)	Calasiao Sports Complex	1–2

February: 2–0

Game	Date	Opponent	Score	High points	High rebounds	High assists	Location Attendance	Record
4	February 2	Columbian	W 97–85	Greg Slaughter (22)	Scottie Thompson (14)	Slaughter, Tenorio, Thompson (5)	Ynares Center	2–2
5	February 9	Blackwater	W 85–67	Japeth Aguilar (20)	Scottie Thompson (11)	LA Tenorio (9)	Davao del Sur Coliseum	3–2

March: 4–1

Game	Date	Opponent	Score	High points	High rebounds	High assists	Location Attendance	Record
6	March 3	Alaska	L 78–104	Japeth Aguilar (17)	Greg Slaughter (14)	LA Tenorio (4)	Ynares Center	3–3
7	March 10	Phoenix Pulse	W 100–97	LA Tenorio (23)	Greg Slaughter (11)	Tenorio, Thompson (5)	Smart Araneta Coliseum	4–3
8	March 17	Magnolia	W 97–93 (OT)	Scottie Thompson (27)	Japeth Aguilar (12)	Arthur dela Cruz (9)	Smart Araneta Coliseum	5–3
9	March 23	NLEX	W 105–96	Japeth Aguilar (27)	Japeth Aguilar (9)	Scottie Thompson (8)	Angeles University Foundation Sports Arena	6–3
10	March 27	Meralco	W 86–76	Greg Slaughter (18)	Scottie Thompson (10)	LA Tenorio (6)	Smart Araneta Coliseum	7–3

April: 0–1

Game	Date	Opponent	Score	High points	High rebounds	High assists	Location Attendance	Record
11	April 4	NorthPort	L 97–100	Greg Slaughter (14)	Scottie Thompson (11)	Sol Mercado (11)	Smart Araneta Coliseum	7–4

=== Playoffs ===
==== Bracket ====
Quarterfinals
(#1 twice-to-beat)
1	Phoenix	91
8	Alaska	76
(Best-of-3)
4	TNT	1
5	San Miguel	2
(#2 twice-to-beat)
2	Rain or Shine	91
7	NorthPort	85
(Best-of-3)
3	Barangay Ginebra	1
6	Magnolia	2

Semifinals (Best-of-7)
1	Phoenix	1
5	San Miguel	4
2	Rain or Shine	3
6	Magnolia	4

Finals (Best-of-7)
5	San Miguel	4
6	Magnolia	3

==== Game log ====
2019 PBA Philippine Cup playoffs game log
Total: 1–2
Quarterfinals: 1–2

Game	Date	Opponent	Score	High points	High rebounds	High assists	Location Attendance	Series
1	April 6	Magnolia	W 86–75	Greg Slaughter (15)	Greg Slaughter (12)	J. Aguilar, Tenorio (7)	Mall of Asia Arena	1–0
2	April 8	Magnolia	L 77–106	Sol Mercado (13)	Japeth Aguilar (7)	Scottie Thompson (4)	Smart Araneta Coliseum	1–1
3	April 10	Magnolia	L 72–85	Jeff Chan (17)	Scottie Thompson (19)	Tenorio, Thompson (7)	Smart Araneta Coliseum; 11,147	1–2

== Commissioner's Cup ==
=== Eliminations ===
==== Standings ====
Pos	Team	W	L	PCT	GB	Qualification
1	TNT KaTropa	10	1	.909	—	Twice-to-beat in the quarterfinals
2	NorthPort Batang Pier	9	2	.818	1	Twice-to-beat in the quarterfinals
3	Blackwater Elite	7	4	.636 (Note: Head-to-head record: Blackwater 1–0 Barangay Ginebra)	3	Best-of-three quarterfinals
4	Barangay Ginebra San Miguel	7	4	.636	3	Best-of-three quarterfinals
5	Magnolia Hotshots Pambansang Manok	5	6	.455 (Note: Head-to-head quotient: Magnolia 1.19, Rain or Shine 1.01, San Miguel 0.83)	5	Best-of-three quarterfinals
6	Rain or Shine Elasto Painters	5	6	.455	5	Best-of-three quarterfinals
7	San Miguel Beermen	5	6	.455	5	Twice-to-win in the quarterfinals
8	Alaska Aces	4	7	.364 (Note: Head-to-head quotient: Alaska 1.012, Meralco 1.011, Phoenix 0.977; 8th-seed playoff: Alaska 108–103 Meralco)	6	Twice-to-win in the quarterfinals
9	Meralco Bolts	4	7	.364	6	
10	Phoenix Pulse Fuel Masters	4	7	.364	6	
11	Columbian Dyip	3	8	.273 (Note: Head-to-head record: Columbian 1–0 NLEX)	7	
12	NLEX Road Warriors	3	8	.273	7	

Source: PBA.ph
Rules for classification: 1) winning percentage; 2) if two teams are tied, head-to-head record; if three or more teams are tied, head-to-head goal average (quotient), if tied for 8th, one-game playoff; 3) overall quotient 4) coin toss

==== Game log ====
2019 PBA Commissioner's Cup game log
Total: 7–4
May: 1–1

Game	Date	Opponent	Score	High points	High rebounds	High assists	Location Attendance	Record
1	May 24	Blackwater	L 107–108 (OT)	Justin Brownlee (44)	Justin Brownlee (10)	Scottie Thompson (10)	Smart Araneta Coliseum	0–1
2	May 26	Meralco	W 110–95	Justin Brownlee (27)	Justin Brownlee (12)	Scottie Thompson (10)	Smart Araneta Coliseum	1–1

June: 4–3

Game	Date	Opponent	Score	High points	High rebounds	High assists	Location Attendance	Record
3	June 1	NorthPort	W 73–70	Justin Brownlee (32)	Scottie Thompson (12)	Justin Brownlee (6)	Mall of Asia Arena	2–1
4	June 7	Rain or Shine	L 81–104	Justin Brownlee (30)	Justin Brownlee (17)	Scottie Thompson (10)	Smart Araneta Coliseum	2–2
5	June 12	TNT	L 96–104	Justin Brownlee (29)	Justin Brownlee (17)	Scottie Thompson (8)	Smart Araneta Coliseum	2–3
6	June 16	San Miguel	W 110–107 (OT)	Justin Brownlee (39)	Greg Slaughter (18)	Slaughter, Tenorio (6)	Smart Araneta Coliseum	3–3
7	June 23	NLEX	W 100–85	Justin Brownlee (37)	Brownlee, Pringle (8)	Brownlee, Thompson (7)	Batangas City Coliseum	4–3
8	June 28	Phoenix Pulse	L 103–111	Justin Brownlee (31)	Justin Brownlee (15)	Justin Brownlee (7)	Smart Araneta Coliseum	4–4
9	June 30	Alaska	W 118–106	Brownlee, Pringle (27)	Justin Brownlee (14)	Brownlee, Pringle (8)	Smart Araneta Coliseum	5–4

July: 2–0

Game	Date	Opponent	Score	High points	High rebounds	High assists	Location Attendance	Record
10	July 7	Magnolia	W 102–81	Justin Brownlee (49)	Justin Brownlee (20)	Justin Brownlee (7)	Smart Araneta Coliseum	6–4
11	July 14	Columbian	W 127–123 (OT)	Justin Brownlee (50)	Justin Brownlee (14)	Scottie Thompson (8)	Smart Araneta Coliseum	7–4

=== Playoffs ===
==== Bracket ====
Quarterfinals
(#1 twice-to-beat)
1	TNT	72	104
8	Alaska	108	93
(Best-of-3)
4	Barangay Ginebra	2
5	Magnolia	0
(#2 twice-to-beat)
2	NorthPort	84	88
7	San Miguel	98	90
(Best-of-3)
3	Blackwater	1
6	Rain or Shine	2

Semifinals (Best-of-5)
1	TNT	3
4	Barangay Ginebra	1
7	San Miguel	3
6	Rain or Shine	1

Finals (Best-of-7)
1	TNT	2
7	San Miguel	4

==== Game log ====
2019 PBA Commissioner's Cup playoffs game log
Total: 3–3
Quarterfinals: 2–0

Game	Date	Opponent	Score	High points	High rebounds	High assists	Location Attendance	Series
1	July 20	Magnolia	W 85–79	Justin Brownlee (20)	Justin Brownlee (16)	Justin Brownlee (5)	Mall of Asia Arena	1–0
2	July 23	Magnolia	W 106–80	Justin Brownlee (30)	Justin Brownlee (9)	LA Tenorio (7)	Smart Araneta Coliseum	2–0

Semifinals: 1–3

Game	Date	Opponent	Score	High points	High rebounds	High assists	Location Attendance	Series
1	July 26	TNT	L 92–95	Justin Brownlee (23)	Justin Brownlee (15)	Justin Brownlee (9)	Smart Araneta Coliseum	0–1
2	July 28	TNT	L 71–88	Justin Brownlee (25)	Justin Brownlee (13)	LA Tenorio (5)	Smart Araneta Coliseum	0–2
3	July 30	TNT	W 80–72	LA Tenorio (16)	Aguilar, Brownlee (11)	Justin Brownlee (8)	Mall of Asia Arena	1–2
4	August 1	TNT	L 92–103	Aguilar, Brownlee (27)	Aguilar, Brownlee, Pringle (9)	Justin Brownlee (8)	Smart Araneta Coliseum	1–3

== Governors' Cup ==
=== Eliminations ===
==== Standings ====
Pos	Team	W	L	PCT	GB	Qualification
1	NLEX Road Warriors	8	3	.727 (Note: Head-to-head quotient: NLEX 1.090, Meralco 0.959, TNT 0.958)	—	Twice-to-beat in quarterfinals
2	Meralco Bolts	8	3	.727	—	Twice-to-beat in quarterfinals
3	TNT KaTropa	8	3	.727	—	Twice-to-beat in quarterfinals
4	Barangay Ginebra San Miguel	7	4	.636	1	Twice-to-beat in quarterfinals
5	San Miguel Beermen	6	5	.545 (Note: Head-to-head record: San Miguel 1–0 Magnolia)	2	Twice-to-win in quarterfinals
6	Magnolia Hotshots Pambansang Manok	6	5	.545	2	Twice-to-win in quarterfinals
7	Alaska Aces	5	6	.455 (Note: Head-to-head record: Alaska 1–0 NorthPort)	3	Twice-to-win in quarterfinals
8	NorthPort Batang Pier	5	6	.455	3	Twice-to-win in quarterfinals
9	Rain or Shine Elasto Painters	4	7	.364 (Note: Head-to-head record: Rain or Shine 1–0 Columbian)	4	
10	Columbian Dyip	4	7	.364	4	
11	Phoenix Pulse Fuel Masters	3	8	.273	5	
12	Blackwater Elite	2	9	.182	6	

Source: PBA.ph
Rules for classification: 1) winning percentage; 2) if two teams are tied, head to head record; if three or more teams are tied, head-to-head goal average (quotient), if tied for 8th, one-game playoff; 3) overall quotient 4) coin toss>

==== Game log ====
2019 PBA Governor's Cup game log
Total: 7–4
September: 1–1

Game	Date	Opponent	Score	High points	High rebounds	High assists	Location Attendance	Record
1	September 22	Alaska	W 102–83	Justin Brownlee (30)	Justin Brownlee (22)	LA Tenorio (8)	Smart Araneta Coliseum	1–0
2	September 28	Phoenix Pulse	L 101–103	Justin Brownlee (25)	Justin Brownlee (12)	Justin Brownlee (12)	Smart Araneta Coliseum	1–1

October: 4–1

Game	Date	Opponent	Score	High points	High rebounds	High assists	Location Attendance	Record
3	October 5	NLEX	L 111–113 (OT)	Justin Brownlee (42)	Justin Brownlee (20)	Justin Brownlee (10)	Coca-Cola Arena	1–2
4	October 13	San Miguel	W 129–124	Justin Brownlee (28)	Justin Brownlee (14)	Justin Brownlee (14)	Smart Araneta Coliseum	2–2
5	October 20	Magnolia	W 105–83	Justin Brownlee (27)	Justin Brownlee (9)	Justin Brownlee (10)	Smart Araneta Coliseum	3–2
6	October 26	Rain or Shine	W 98–89	Justin Brownlee (39)	Justin Brownlee (17)	Justin Brownlee (8)	Smart Araneta Coliseum	4–2
7	October 30	Blackwater	W 101–93	LA Tenorio (20)	Justin Brownlee (12)	Justin Brownlee (11)	Cuneta Astrodome	5–2

November: 2–2

Game	Date	Opponent	Score	High points	High rebounds	High assists	Location Attendance	Record
8	November 3	Meralco	L 77–101	Justin Brownlee (18)	Justin Brownlee (7)	LA Tenorio (5)	Smart Araneta Coliseum	5–3
9	November 8	TNT	W 96–93	Japeth Aguilar (29)	Justin Brownlee (16)	Justin Brownlee (6)	Smart Araneta Coliseum	6–3
10	November 15	Columbian	W 113–90	Justin Brownlee (26)	Japeth Aguilar (10)	LA Tenorio (14)	Smart Araneta Coliseum	7–3
11	November 17	NorthPort	L 96–98	Justin Brownlee (31)	Aguilar, Brownlee (9)	Scottie Thompson (7)	Smart Araneta Coliseum	7–4

=== Playoffs ===
==== Bracket ====
Quarterfinals (Top 4 twice-to-beat)
1	NLEX	90	123
8	NorthPort	115	126***
4	Barangay Ginebra	100
5	San Miguel	97
2	Meralco	94
7	Alaska	84
3	TNT	98
6	Magnolia	97

Semifinals (Best-of-5)
8	NorthPort	1
4	Barangay Ginebra	3
2	Meralco	3
3	TNT	2

Finals (Best-of-7)
4	Barangay Ginebra	4
2	Meralco	1

***Game went into triple overtime

==== Game log ====
2019 PBA Governors' Cup playoffs game log
Total: 8–2
Quarterfinals: 1–0

Game	Date	Opponent	Score	High points	High rebounds	High assists	Location Attendance	Record
1	November 24	San Miguel	W 100–97	Justin Brownlee (41)	Justin Brownlee (11)	LA Tenorio (7)	Smart Araneta Coliseum; 10,708	1–0

Semifinals: 3–1

Game	Date	Opponent	Score	High points	High rebounds	High assists	Location Attendance	Record
1	December 14	NorthPort	L 90–124	Justin Brownlee (24)	Justin Brownlee (19)	Justin Brownlee (6)	Smart Araneta Coliseum	0–1
2	December 16	NorthPort	W 113–88	Stanley Pringle (23)	Japeth Aguilar (12)	Scottie Thompson (6)	Smart Araneta Coliseum	1–1
3	December 18	NorthPort	W 132–105	Justin Brownlee (41)	Justin Brownlee (11)	Scottie Thompson (8)	Smart Araneta Coliseum	2–1
4	December 20	NorthPort	W 120–107	Justin Brownlee (36)	Justin Brownlee (19)	Justin Brownlee (8)	Smart Araneta Coliseum	3–1

Finals: 4–1

Game	Date	Opponent	Score	High points	High rebounds	High assists	Location Attendance	Record
1	January 7	Meralco	W 91–87	Justin Brownlee (38)	Justin Brownlee (16)	Scottie Thompson (6)	Smart Araneta Coliseum; 10,708	1–0
2	January 10	Meralco	L 102–104	Justin Brownlee (35)	Justin Brownlee (11)	Scottie Thompson (7)	Quezon Convention Center	1–1
3	January 12	Meralco	W 92–84	Justin Brownlee (24)	Justin Brownlee (9)	Justin Brownlee (9)	Smart Araneta Coliseum; 16,001	2–1
4	January 15	Meralco	W 94–72	Justin Brownlee (27)	Japeth Aguilar (9)	Justin Brownlee (8)	Smart Araneta Coliseum; 11,496	3–1
5	January 17	Meralco	W 105–93	Japeth Aguilar (25)	Scottie Thompson (9)	Justin Brownlee (10)	Mall of Asia Arena; 15,146	4–1

== Transactions ==
=== Free Agency ===
==== Addition ====
Country	Player	Number	Position	Contract	Date signed	Former Team
(Philippines)	Teytey Teodoro	41	Guard	—N/a	—N/a	Columbian

==== Subtraction ====
Country	Player	Number	Position	Reason	New Team
(Philippines)	Jett Manuel	2	Guard	Retired	—N/a
