= 2019 Columbian Dyip season =

- Head coach: Johnedel Cardel
- Owner: Columbian Autocar Corporation

Philippine Cup results
- Record: 4–7 (36.4%)
- Place: 10th
- Playoff finish: Did not qualify

Commissioner's Cup results
- Record: 3–8 (27.3%)
- Place: 11th
- Playoff finish: Did not qualify

Governors' Cup results
- Record: 4–7 (36.4%)
- Place: 10th
- Playoff finish: Did not qualify

Columbian Dyip seasons

The 2019 Columbian Dyip season was the 5th season of the franchise in the Philippine Basketball Association (PBA).

== Key dates ==
=== 2018 ===
- December 16: The 2018 PBA draft took place in Midtown Atrium, Robinson Place Manila.

== Draft picks ==
Round	Pick	Player	Position	Nationality	PBA D-League team	College
1	1	CJ Perez	G	Hong Kong	Zark's Jawbreakers - LPU	Lyceum
1	11	JP Calvo	G	Philippines	Wang's Basketball Couriers	Letran
2	18	Cyrus Tabi	G	Philippines	Batangas-EAC	RTU
3	23	Teytey Teodoro	G	Philippines	JRU	JRU
4	33	Oliver Arim	F	Philippines	Batangas-EAC	CEU

== Roster ==
2019 Columbian Dyip roster
Players
Coaches

Pos.	#	POB	Name	Height	Weight	DOB (YYYY–MM–DD)	From
G	0	(Philippines)	Reden Celda	5 ft 11 in (1.80 m)	165 lb (75 kg)	1992–03–01	National-U
F	1	(Philippines)	Jackson Corpuz	6 ft 4 in (1.93 m)	195 lb (88 kg)	1989–02–08	Philippine Christian
F	3	(Philippines)	Roider Cabrera	6 ft 2 in (1.88 m)	170 lb (77 kg)	1991–03–15	Adamson
F/C	4	(Philippines)	Jay-R Reyes	6 ft 7 in (2.01 m)	225 lb (102 kg)	1984–07–16	UP Diliman
G	5	(Philippines)	Juami Tiongson	5 ft 10 in (1.78 m)	175 lb (79 kg)	1991–02–05	Ateneo
F/C	6	(Philippines)	Jonjon Gabriel	6 ft 6 in (1.98 m)		–01–06	San Lorenzo
G/F	7	(Hong Kong)	CJ Perez (R)	6 ft 2 in (1.88 m)	185 lb (84 kg)	1993–11–17	Lyceum
G	8	(Philippines)	JP Calvo (R)	5 ft 7 in (1.70 m)	215 lb (98 kg)	1997–09–29	Letran
F	10	(Sweden)	Andreas Cahilig	6 ft 5 in (1.96 m)		1991–01–22	EARIST
G	11	(United States)	Rashawn McCarthy	6 ft 0 in (1.83 m)	175 lb (79 kg)	1989–09–10	SUNY–Old Westbury
F	12	(Philippines)	Glenn Khobuntin (C)	6 ft 4 in (1.93 m)	195 lb (88 kg)	1991–09–07	National-U
F	13	(Philippines)	Eric Camson (IN)	6 ft 4 in (1.93 m)	228 lb (103 kg)	1990–05–12	Adamson
F/C	15	(Philippines)	Jeepy Faundo (R)	6 ft 6 in (1.98 m)		1995–09–19	UST
F	23	(Philippines)	Keith Agovida	6 ft 2 in (1.88 m)	170 lb (77 kg)	1990–02–14	Arellano
F/C	26	(Philippines)	Lervin Flores	6 ft 5 in (1.96 m)		1992–09–26	Arellano
C	28	(Philippines)	Joseph Gabayni	6 ft 5 in (1.96 m)		1994–09–28	Lyceum

Head coach

- (Philippines) Johnedel Cardel

Assistant coach(es)

- (Philippines) Hubert delos Santos (1st assistant)
- (Philippines) Emerson Colina
- (Philippines) Art dela Cruz
- (Philippines) Raymond Tiongco

Team manager

- (Philippines) Joe Lipa

Legend

- (C) Team captain
- (CI) Commissioner's Cup Import
- (GI) Governors' Cup Import
- (EI) EASL Import
- (DP) Unsigned draft pick
- (FA) Free agent
- (IN) Inactive
- (S) Suspended
- (R) Rookie
- Injured

Roster

== Philippine Cup ==
=== Eliminations ===
==== Standings ====
Pos	Team	W	L	PCT	GB	Qualification
1	Phoenix Pulse Fuel Masters	9	2	.818	—	Twice-to-beat in the quarterfinals
2	Rain or Shine Elasto Painters	8	3	.727	1	Twice-to-beat in the quarterfinals
3	Barangay Ginebra San Miguel	7	4	.636 (Note: Head-to-head quotient: Barangay Ginebra 1.02, TNT 1.00, San Miguel 0.98)	2	Best-of-three quarterfinals
4	TNT KaTropa	7	4	.636	2	Best-of-three quarterfinals
5	San Miguel Beermen	7	4	.636	2	Best-of-three quarterfinals
6	Magnolia Hotshots Pambansang Manok	6	5	.545	3	Best-of-three quarterfinals
7	NorthPort Batang Pier	5	6	.455	4	Twice-to-win in the quarterfinals
8	Alaska Aces	4	7	.364 (Note: Head-to-head quotient: NLEX 1.19, Alaska 1.01, Columbian 0.84; 8th-seed playoff: Alaska 88–80 NLEX)	5	Twice-to-win in the quarterfinals
9	NLEX Road Warriors	4	7	.364	5	
10	Columbian Dyip	4	7	.364	5	
11	Meralco Bolts	3	8	.273	6	
12	Blackwater Elite	2	9	.182	7	

Source: PBA.ph
Rules for classification: 1) winning percentage; 2) if two teams are tied, head-to-head record; if three or more teams are tied, head-to-head goal average (quotient), if tied for 8th, one-game playoff; 3) overall quotient 4) coin toss

==== Game log ====
2019 PBA Philippine Cup game log
Total: 4–7
January: 2–2

Game	Date	Opponent	Score	High points	High rebounds	High assists	Location Attendance	Record
1	January 18	San Miguel	W 124–118	CJ Perez (26)	Jackson Corpuz (11)	Rashawn McCarthy (6)	Cuneta Astrodome	1–0
2	January 23	Phoenix	L 98–108	JP Calvo (18)	Perez, Reyes (8)	CJ Perez (6)	Smart Araneta Coliseum	1–1
3	January 25	NorthPort	W 110–100	Celda, Corpuz, Faundo (15)	Jackson Corpuz (8)	Rashawn McCarthy (12)	Ynares Center	2–1
4	January 27	NLEX	L 97–107	Jay-R Reyes (17)	CJ Perez (11)	CJ Perez (5)	Smart Araneta Coliseum	2–2

February: 1–2

Game	Date	Opponent	Score	High points	High rebounds	High assists	Location Attendance	Record
5	February 2	Barangay Ginebra	L 85–97	CJ Perez (25)	CJ Perez (7)	JP Calvo (5)	Ynares Center	2–3
6	February 6	Alaska	L 72–94	CJ Perez (15)	Calvo, Corpuz, McCarthy (6)	Rashawn McCarthy (5)	Mall of Asia Arena	2–4
7	February 27	Meralco	W 86–85	Rashawn McCarthy (30)	Rashawn McCarthy (8)	JP Calvo (4)	Smart Araneta Coliseum	3–4

March: 1–3

Game	Date	Opponent	Score	High points	High rebounds	High assists	Location Attendance	Record
8	March 1	Blackwater	L 100–106	CJ Perez (22)	CJ Perez (8)	Rashawn McCarthy (7)	Mall of Asia Arena	3–5
9	March 6	Rain or Shine	W 85–82	Rashawn McCarthy (22)	CJ Perez (11)	JP Calvo (8)	Smart Araneta Coliseum	4–5
10	March 13	Magnolia	L 83–109	Rashawn McCarthy (19)	Jackson Corpuz (11)	Rashawn McCarthy (3)	Smart Araneta Coliseum	4–6
11	March 22	TNT	L 98–101	CJ Perez (22)	Perez, Reyes (9)	CJ Perez (5)	Ynares Center	4–7

== Commissioner's Cup ==
=== Eliminations ===
==== Standings ====
Pos	Team	W	L	PCT	GB	Qualification
1	TNT KaTropa	10	1	.909	—	Twice-to-beat in the quarterfinals
2	NorthPort Batang Pier	9	2	.818	1	Twice-to-beat in the quarterfinals
3	Blackwater Elite	7	4	.636 (Note: Head-to-head record: Blackwater 1–0 Barangay Ginebra)	3	Best-of-three quarterfinals
4	Barangay Ginebra San Miguel	7	4	.636	3	Best-of-three quarterfinals
5	Magnolia Hotshots Pambansang Manok	5	6	.455 (Note: Head-to-head quotient: Magnolia 1.19, Rain or Shine 1.01, San Miguel 0.83)	5	Best-of-three quarterfinals
6	Rain or Shine Elasto Painters	5	6	.455	5	Best-of-three quarterfinals
7	San Miguel Beermen	5	6	.455	5	Twice-to-win in the quarterfinals
8	Alaska Aces	4	7	.364 (Note: Head-to-head quotient: Alaska 1.012, Meralco 1.011, Phoenix 0.977; 8th-seed playoff: Alaska 108–103 Meralco)	6	Twice-to-win in the quarterfinals
9	Meralco Bolts	4	7	.364	6	
10	Phoenix Pulse Fuel Masters	4	7	.364	6	
11	Columbian Dyip	3	8	.273 (Note: Head-to-head record: Columbian 1–0 NLEX)	7	
12	NLEX Road Warriors	3	8	.273	7	

Source: PBA.ph
Rules for classification: 1) winning percentage; 2) if two teams are tied, head-to-head record; if three or more teams are tied, head-to-head goal average (quotient), if tied for 8th, one-game playoff; 3) overall quotient 4) coin toss

==== Game log ====
2019 PBA Commissioner's Cup game log
Total: 3–8
May: 0–3

Game	Date	Opponent	Score	High points	High rebounds	High assists	Location Attendance	Record
1	May 19	Alaska	L 98–111	Kyle Barone (30)	Kyle Barone (22)	JP Calvo (7)	Mall of Asia Arena	0–1
2	May 24	Meralco	L 92–101	Kyle Barone (26)	Kyle Barone (16)	Rashawn McCarthy (7)	Smart Araneta Coliseum	0–2
3	May 26	Blackwater	L 110–118	Kyle Barone (21)	Kyle Barone (14)	Rashawn McCarthy (6)	Smart Araneta Coliseum	0–3

June: 2–3

Game	Date	Opponent	Score	High points	High rebounds	High assists	Location Attendance	Record
4	June 1	NLEX	W 120–105	CJ Perez (39)	CJ Perez (9)	JP Calvo (9)	Mall of Asia Arena	1–3
5	June 16	Magnolia	L 103–110	Lester Prosper (26)	Lester Prosper (14)	Rashawn McCarthy (4)	Smart Araneta Coliseum	1–4
6	June 21	TNT	L 102–109	Lester Prosper (37)	Lester Prosper (20)	CJ Perez (7)	Cuneta Astrodome	1–5
7	June 23	Rain or Shine	L 86–88 (OT)	Lester Prosper (26)	Lester Prosper (15)	CJ Perez (6)	Batangas City Coliseum	1–6
8	June 30	San Miguel	W 134–132 (OT)	Lester Prosper (40)	Lester Prosper (13)	Rashawn McCarthy (14)	Smart Araneta Coliseum	2–6

July: 1–2

Game	Date	Opponent	Score	High points	High rebounds	High assists	Location Attendance	Record
9	July 3	NorthPort	L 108–110	Lester Prosper (36)	Lester Prosper (17)	CJ Perez (6)	Smart Araneta Coliseum	2–7
10	July 6	Phoenix	W 100–98	Lester Prosper (25)	Lester Prosper (21)	Reden Celda (8)	Mall of Asia Arena	3–7
11	July 14	Barangay Ginebra	L 123–127 (OT)	Lester Prosper (45)	Lester Prosper (18)	Rashawn McCarthy (11)	Smart Araneta Coliseum	3–8

== Governors' Cup ==
=== Eliminations ===
==== Standings ====
Pos	Team	W	L	PCT	GB	Qualification
1	NLEX Road Warriors	8	3	.727 (Note: Head-to-head quotient: NLEX 1.090, Meralco 0.959, TNT 0.958)	—	Twice-to-beat in quarterfinals
2	Meralco Bolts	8	3	.727	—	Twice-to-beat in quarterfinals
3	TNT KaTropa	8	3	.727	—	Twice-to-beat in quarterfinals
4	Barangay Ginebra San Miguel	7	4	.636	1	Twice-to-beat in quarterfinals
5	San Miguel Beermen	6	5	.545 (Note: Head-to-head record: San Miguel 1–0 Magnolia)	2	Twice-to-win in quarterfinals
6	Magnolia Hotshots Pambansang Manok	6	5	.545	2	Twice-to-win in quarterfinals
7	Alaska Aces	5	6	.455 (Note: Head-to-head record: Alaska 1–0 NorthPort)	3	Twice-to-win in quarterfinals
8	NorthPort Batang Pier	5	6	.455	3	Twice-to-win in quarterfinals
9	Rain or Shine Elasto Painters	4	7	.364 (Note: Head-to-head record: Rain or Shine 1–0 Columbian)	4	
10	Columbian Dyip	4	7	.364	4	
11	Phoenix Pulse Fuel Masters	3	8	.273	5	
12	Blackwater Elite	2	9	.182	6	

Source: PBA.ph
Rules for classification: 1) winning percentage; 2) if two teams are tied, head to head record; if three or more teams are tied, head-to-head goal average (quotient), if tied for 8th, one-game playoff; 3) overall quotient 4) coin toss>

==== Game log ====
2019 PBA Governors' Cup game log
Total: 4–7
September: 1–1

Game	Date	Opponent	Score	High points	High rebounds	High assists	Location Attendance	Record
1	September 20	Alaska	W 117–110	Khapri Alston (38)	Khapri Alston (22)	Alston, Tiongson (4)	Mall of Asia Arena	1–0
2	September 22	Rain or Shine	L 90–96	Khapri Alston (23)	Khapri Alston (15)	Khapri Alston (5)	Smart Araneta Coliseum	1–1

October: 3–4

Game	Date	Opponent	Score	High points	High rebounds	High assists	Location Attendance	Record
3	October 2	NorthPort	W 114–108	CJ Perez (26)	Khapri Alston (17)	CJ Perez (6)	Smart Araneta Coliseum	2–1
4	October 5	TNT	L 120–125	Khapri Alston (38)	Khapri Alston (13)	Rashawn McCarthy (5)	Ynares Center	2–2
5	October 11	Blackwater	W 102–90	Rashawn McCarthy (25)	Khapri Alston (20)	CJ Perez (6)	Mall of Asia Arena	3–2
6	October 16	NLEX	L 111–117	CJ Perez (21)	Khapri Alston (17)	Alston, Celda (7)	Ynares Center	3–3
7	October 20	San Miguel	L 107–113	Khapri Alston (38)	Khapri Alston (25)	Rashawn McCarthy (6)	Smart Araneta Coliseum	3–4
8	October 25	Phoenix	W 106–104	Khapri Alston (30)	Khapri Alston (19)	Rashawn McCarthy (3)	Smart Araneta Coliseum	4–4
9	October 27	Magnolia	L 103–118	CJ Perez (28)	Khapri Alston (14)	Rashawn McCarthy (6)	Smart Araneta Coliseum	4–5

November: 0–2

Game	Date	Opponent	Score	High points	High rebounds	High assists	Location Attendance	Record
10	November 8	Meralco	L 74–92	CJ Perez (21)	Khapri Alston (16)	Rashawn McCarthy (4)	Smart Araneta Coliseum	4–6
11	November 15	Barangay Ginebra	L 90–113	Khapri Alston (34)	Khapri Alston (22)	CJ Perez (5)	Smart Araneta Coliseum	4–7

== Transactions ==
=== Trades ===
==== Preseason ====
December
December 19, 2018	To Columbian Dyip Keith Agovida	To San Miguel Ronald Tubid

=== Rookie signings ===
Country	Player	Number	Position	Contract	Date signed	School/club team
(Hong Kong)	CJ Perez	7	Guard/forward	3 years / 8.5 M	December 20, 2018	Lyceum
(Philippines)	Jeepy Faundo	15	Forward/center	Unavailable	December 21, 2018	UST
(Philippines)	JP Calvo	8	Guard	Unavailable	December 21, 2018	Letran

== Awards ==
Recipient	Award	Date awarded	Ref.
CJ Perez	Philippine Cup Rookie of the Month	February 4, 2019	
