= 2019 NorthPort Batang Pier season =

- Head coach: Pido Jarencio
- Owner(s): Sultan 900 Capital, Inc.

Philippine Cup results
- Record: 5–6 (45.5%)
- Place: 7th
- Playoff finish: Quarterfinalist (lost to Rain or Shine with twice-to-win disadvantage)

Commissioner's Cup results
- Record: 9–2 (81.8%)
- Place: 2nd
- Playoff finish: Quarterfinalist (lost to San Miguel with twice-to-beat advantage)

Governors' Cup results
- Record: 5–6 (45.5%)
- Place: 8th
- Playoff finish: Semifinalist (lost to Barangay Ginebra 1–3)

NorthPort Batang Pier seasons

The 2019 NorthPort Batang Pier season was the 7th season of the franchise in the Philippine Basketball Association (PBA).

== Key dates ==
=== 2018 ===
- December 16: The 2018 PBA draft took place in Midtown Atrium, Robinson Place Manila.

== Draft picks ==
| Round | Pick | Player | Position | Nationality | PBA D-League team | College |
|---|---|---|---|---|---|---|
| 1 | 3 | Robert Bolick | G | Philippines | Cignal HD - San Beda | San Beda |
| 3 | 25 | Edrian Lao | C/F | Philippines | Cagayan Rising Suns | Visayas |
| 4 | 35 | Jeremiah Taladua | G | Philippines | Wang's Basketball Couriers | Letran |
| 5 | 41 | John Ragasa | G | United Kingdom | Batangas-EAC | St. Mary's (London) |

== Roster ==
2019 NorthPort Batang Pier roster
Players
Coaches

| Pos. | # | POB | Name | Height | Weight | DOB (YYYY–MM–DD) | From |
|---|---|---|---|---|---|---|---|
| G/F | 0 | (Philippines) | Paolo Taha | 6 ft 0 in (1.83 m) | 180 lb (82 kg) | 1990–12–05 | St. Benilde |
| G | 3 | (United States) | Sol Mercado | 6 ft 1 in (1.85 m) | 200 lb (91 kg) | 1984–05–06 | Biola |
| G | 8 | (Philippines) | Robert Bolick (injured) (R) | 6 ft 1 in (1.85 m) | 178 lb (81 kg) | 1995–09–13 | San Beda |
| G | 9 | (Philippines) | Nico Elorde | 5 ft 10 in (1.78 m) | 155 lb (70 kg) | 1991–10–04 | Ateneo |
| F | 10 | (Canada) | Sean Anthony (C) | 6 ft 4 in (1.93 m) | 200 lb (91 kg) | 1986–01–26 | McGill |
| G | 13 | (Philippines) | Garvo Lanete | 6 ft 2 in (1.88 m) | 180 lb (82 kg) | 1989–02–13 | San Beda |
| G/F | 14 | (Philippines) | Jonathan Grey (injured) | 6 ft 3 in (1.91 m) | 190 lb (86 kg) | 1992–01–13 | St. Benilde |
| G | 18 | (Philippines) | Ryan Araña (IN) | 6 ft 2 in (1.88 m) | 180 lb (82 kg) | 1984–03–23 | De La Salle |
| F | 20 | (Philippines) | Jervy Cruz | 6 ft 4 in (1.93 m) | 220 lb (100 kg) | 1986–09–09 | UST |
| F/C | 30 | (Philippines) | Bradwyn Guinto (IN) | 6 ft 6 in (1.98 m) | 220 lb (100 kg) | 1991–10–20 | San Sebastian |
| F/C | 34 | (Germany) | Christian Standhardinger | 6 ft 8 in (2.03 m) | 220 lb (100 kg) | 1989–07–04 | Hawaiʻi |
| G | 35 | (United States) | Jerramy King | 5 ft 11 in (1.80 m) | 165 lb (75 kg) | 1990–09–26 | Long Beach State |
| F | 77 | (Philippines) | Kevin Ferrer | 6 ft 5 in (1.96 m) | 188 lb (85 kg) | 1993–03–26 | UST |
| F/C | 88 | (Philippines) | Russel Escoto | 6 ft 6 in (1.98 m) | 200 lb (91 kg) | 1992–12–04 | Far Eastern |

Head coach

- (Philippines) Pido Jarencio

Assistant coach(es)

- (Philippines) Rensy Bajar (1st assistant)
- (Philippines) Jeff Napa

Team manager

- (Philippines) Bonnie Tan
- (Philippines) Walyip Chong (assistant)

Legend

- (C) Team captain
- (CI) Commissioner's Cup Import
- (GI) Governors' Cup Import
- (EI) EASL Import
- (DP) Unsigned draft pick
- (FA) Free agent
- (IN) Inactive
- (S) Suspended
- (R) Rookie
- Injured

Roster

== Philippine Cup ==
=== Eliminations ===
==== Standings ====
| Pos | Team | W | L | PCT | GB | Qualification |
|---|---|---|---|---|---|---|
| 1 | Phoenix Pulse Fuel Masters | 9 | 2 | .818 | — | Twice-to-beat in the quarterfinals |
| 2 | Rain or Shine Elasto Painters | 8 | 3 | .727 | 1 | Twice-to-beat in the quarterfinals |
| 3 | Barangay Ginebra San Miguel | 7 | 4 | .636 (Note: Head-to-head quotient: Barangay Ginebra 1.02, TNT 1.00, San Miguel 0.98) | 2 | Best-of-three quarterfinals |
| 4 | TNT KaTropa | 7 | 4 | .636 | 2 | Best-of-three quarterfinals |
| 5 | San Miguel Beermen | 7 | 4 | .636 | 2 | Best-of-three quarterfinals |
| 6 | Magnolia Hotshots Pambansang Manok | 6 | 5 | .545 | 3 | Best-of-three quarterfinals |
| 7 | NorthPort Batang Pier | 5 | 6 | .455 | 4 | Twice-to-win in the quarterfinals |
| 8 | Alaska Aces | 4 | 7 | .364 (Note: Head-to-head quotient: NLEX 1.19, Alaska 1.01, Columbian 0.84; 8th-seed playoff: Alaska 88–80 NLEX) | 5 | Twice-to-win in the quarterfinals |
| 9 | NLEX Road Warriors | 4 | 7 | .364 | 5 | |
| 10 | Columbian Dyip | 4 | 7 | .364 | 5 | |
| 11 | Meralco Bolts | 3 | 8 | .273 | 6 | |
| 12 | Blackwater Elite | 2 | 9 | .182 | 7 | |

Source: PBA.ph
Rules for classification: 1) winning percentage; 2) if two teams are tied, head-to-head record; if three or more teams are tied, head-to-head goal average (quotient), if tied for 8th, one-game playoff; 3) overall quotient 4) coin toss

==== Game log ====
2019 PBA Philippine Cup game log
Total: 5–6
January: 2–1

| Game | Date | Opponent | Score | High points | High rebounds | High assists | Location Attendance | Record |
|---|---|---|---|---|---|---|---|---|
| 1 | January 16 | Blackwater | W 117–91 | Robert Bolick (26) | Lervin Flores (12) | Anthony, Pringle (5) | Smart Araneta Coliseum | 1–0 |
| 2 | January 20 | NLEX | W 95–90 | Sean Anthony (22) | Moala Tautuaa (11) | Sean Anthony (5) | Smart Araneta Coliseum | 2–0 |
| 3 | January 25 | Columbian | L 100–110 | Stanley Pringle (29) | Moala Tautuaa (12) | Bolick, Pringle (6) | Ynares Center | 2–1 |

February : 0–2

| Game | Date | Opponent | Score | High points | High rebounds | High assists | Location Attendance | Record |
|---|---|---|---|---|---|---|---|---|
| 4 | February 8 | Rain or Shine | L 100–107 | Stanley Pringle (34) | Bradwyn Guinto (8) | Bolick, Tautuaa (6) | Mall of Asia Arena | 2–2 |
| 5 | February 27 | Phoenix | L 96–98 | Moala Tautuaa (22) | Araña, Anthony (9) | Moala Tautuaa (7) | Smart Araneta Coliseum | 2–3 |

March : 2–3

| Game | Date | Opponent | Score | High points | High rebounds | High assists | Location Attendance | Record |
|---|---|---|---|---|---|---|---|---|
| 6 | March 8 | Meralco | L 111–121 (2OT) | Stanley Pringle (33) | Sean Anthony (16) | Nico Elorde (6) | Smart Araneta Coliseum | 2–4 |
| 7 | March 10 | San Miguel | L 107–113 | Moala Tautuaa (28) | Moala Tautuaa (13) | Stanley Pringle (9) | Smart Araneta Coliseum | 2–5 |
| 8 | March 20 | Magnolia | L 90–103 | Sean Anthony (22) | Moala Tautuaa (16) | Stanley Pringle (5) | Smart Araneta Coliseum | 2–6 |
| 9 | March 24 | TNT | W 109–83 | Stanley Pringle (27) | Robert Bolick (12) | Robert Bolick (7) | Smart Araneta Coliseum | 3–6 |
| 10 | March 27 | Alaska | W 94–84 | Sean Anthony (24) | Sean Anthony (17) | Bolick, Tautuaa (5) | Smart Araneta Coliseum | 4–6 |

April : 1–0

| Game | Date | Opponent | Score | High points | High rebounds | High assists | Location Attendance | Record |
|---|---|---|---|---|---|---|---|---|
| 11 | April 3 | Barangay Ginebra | W 100–97 | Robert Bolick (24) | Stanley Pringle (7) | Stanley Pringle (8) | Smart Araneta Coliseum | 5–6 |

=== Playoffs ===
==== Bracket ====
Quarterfinals
(#1 twice-to-beat)
1 | Phoenix | 91
8 | Alaska | 76
(best-of-3)
4 | TNT | 1
5 | San Miguel | 2
(#2 twice-to-beat)
2 | Rain or Shine | 91
7 | NorthPort | 85
(best-of-3)
3 | Barangay Ginebra | 1
6 | Magnolia | 2

Semifinals (best-of-7)
1 | Phoenix | 1
5 | San Miguel | 4
2 | Rain or Shine | 3
6 | Magnolia | 4

Finals (best-of-7)
5 | San Miguel | 4
6 | Magnolia | 3

==== Game log ====
2019 PBA Philippine Cup playoffs game log
Total: 0–1
Quarterfinals: 0–1

| Game | Date | Opponent | Score | High points | High rebounds | High assists | Location Attendance | Series |
|---|---|---|---|---|---|---|---|---|
| 1 | April 7 | Rain or Shine | L 85–91 | Moala Tautuaa (24) | Stanley Pringle (11) | Stanley Pringle (6) | Mall of Asia Arena | 0–1 |

== Commissioner's Cup ==
=== Eliminations ===
==== Standings ====
| Pos | Team | W | L | PCT | GB | Qualification |
|---|---|---|---|---|---|---|
| 1 | TNT KaTropa | 10 | 1 | .909 | — | Twice-to-beat in the quarterfinals |
| 2 | NorthPort Batang Pier | 9 | 2 | .818 | 1 | Twice-to-beat in the quarterfinals |
| 3 | Blackwater Elite | 7 | 4 | .636 (Note: Head-to-head record: Blackwater 1–0 Barangay Ginebra) | 3 | Best-of-three quarterfinals |
| 4 | Barangay Ginebra San Miguel | 7 | 4 | .636 | 3 | Best-of-three quarterfinals |
| 5 | Magnolia Hotshots Pambansang Manok | 5 | 6 | .455 (Note: Head-to-head quotient: Magnolia 1.19, Rain or Shine 1.01, San Miguel 0.83) | 5 | Best-of-three quarterfinals |
| 6 | Rain or Shine Elasto Painters | 5 | 6 | .455 | 5 | Best-of-three quarterfinals |
| 7 | San Miguel Beermen | 5 | 6 | .455 | 5 | Twice-to-win in the quarterfinals |
| 8 | Alaska Aces | 4 | 7 | .364 (Note: Head-to-head quotient: Alaska 1.012, Meralco 1.011, Phoenix 0.977; 8th-seed playoff: Alaska 108–103 Meralco) | 6 | Twice-to-win in the quarterfinals |
| 9 | Meralco Bolts | 4 | 7 | .364 | 6 | |
| 10 | Phoenix Pulse Fuel Masters | 4 | 7 | .364 | 6 | |
| 11 | Columbian Dyip | 3 | 8 | .273 (Note: Head-to-head record: Columbian 1–0 NLEX) | 7 | |
| 12 | NLEX Road Warriors | 3 | 8 | .273 | 7 | |

Source: PBA.ph
Rules for classification: 1) winning percentage; 2) if two teams are tied, head-to-head record; if three or more teams are tied, head-to-head goal average (quotient), if tied for 8th, one-game playoff; 3) overall quotient 4) coin toss

==== Game log ====
2019 PBA Commissioner's Cup game log
Total: 9–2
May: 3–0

| Game | Date | Opponent | Score | High points | High rebounds | High assists | Location Attendance | Record |
|---|---|---|---|---|---|---|---|---|
| 1 | May 22 | Alaska | W 103–81 | Sean Anthony (22) | Prince Ibeh (13) | Moala Tautuaa (6) | Ynares Center | 1–0 |
| 2 | May 25 | NLEX | W 83–79 | Robert Bolick (18) | Prince Ibeh (19) | Elorde, Tautuaa (3) | Smart Araneta Coliseum | 2–0 |
| 3 | May 29 | TNT | W 110–86 | Stanley Pringle (22) | Prince Ibeh (20) | Moala Tautuaa (6) | Mall of Asia Arena | 3–0 |

June : 4–2

| Game | Date | Opponent | Score | High points | High rebounds | High assists | Location Attendance | Record |
|---|---|---|---|---|---|---|---|---|
| 4 | June 1 | Barangay Ginebra | L 70–73 | Moala Tautuaa (15) | Prince Ibeh (24) | Bolick, Elorde, Tautuaa (4) | Mall of Asia Arena | 3–1 |
| 5 | June 5 | San Miguel | W 121–88 | Robert Bolick (25) | Sean Anthony (12) | Nico Elorde (9) | Smart Araneta Coliseum | 4–1 |
| 6 | June 12 | Magnolia | W 102–99 | Sean Anthony (22) | Prince Ibeh (13) | Robert Bolick (9) | Smart Araneta Coliseum | 5–1 |
| 7 | June 19 | Rain or Shine | W 107–105 (OT) | Moala Tautuaa (34) | Prince Ibeh (21) | Robert Bolick (9) | Mall of Asia Arena | 6–1 |
| 8 | June 22 | Blackwater | W 127–99 | Kevin Ferrer (23) | Prince Ibeh (13) | Robert Bolick (10) | Cuneta Astrodome | 7–1 |
| 9 | June 26 | Phoenix | L 87–97 | Moala Tautuaa (19) | Prince Ibeh (10) | Sean Anthony (6) | Smart Araneta Coliseum | 7–2 |

July : 2–0

| Game | Date | Opponent | Score | High points | High rebounds | High assists | Location Attendance | Record |
|---|---|---|---|---|---|---|---|---|
| 10 | July 3 | Columbian | W 110–108 | Moala Tautuaa (23) | Prince Ibeh (15) | Elorde, Tautuaa (6) | Smart Araneta Coliseum | 8–2 |
| 11 | July 12 | Meralco | W 93–92 | Robert Bolick (18) | Prince Ibeh (15) | Nico Elorde (8) | Cuneta Astrodome | 9–2 |

=== Playoffs ===
==== Bracket ====
Quarterfinals
(#1 twice-to-beat)
1 | TNT | 72 | 104
8 | Alaska | 108 | 93
(best-of-3)
4 | Barangay Ginebra | 2
5 | Magnolia | 0
(#2 twice-to-beat)
2 | NorthPort | 84 | 88
7 | San Miguel | 98 | 90
(best-of-3)
3 | Blackwater | 1
6 | Rain or Shine | 2

Semifinals (best-of-5)
1 | TNT | 3
4 | Barangay Ginebra | 1
7 | San Miguel | 3
6 | Rain or Shine | 1

Finals (best-of-7)
1 | TNT | 2
7 | San Miguel | 4

==== Game log ====
2019 PBA Commissioner's Cup playoffs game log
Total: 0–2
Quarterfinals: 0–2

| Game | Date | Opponent | Score | High points | High rebounds | High assists | Location Attendance | Series |
|---|---|---|---|---|---|---|---|---|
| 1 | July 21 | San Miguel | L 84–98 | Robert Bolick (20) | Prince Ibeh (13) | Robert Bolick (6) | Smart Araneta Coliseum | 0–1 |
| 2 | July 24 | San Miguel | L 88–90 | Garvo Lanete (22) | Prince Ibeh (20) | Robert Bolick (7) | Smart Araneta Coliseum | 0–2 |

== Governors' Cup ==
=== Eliminations ===
==== Standings ====
| Pos | Team | W | L | PCT | GB | Qualification |
|---|---|---|---|---|---|---|
| 1 | NLEX Road Warriors | 8 | 3 | .727 (Note: Head-to-head quotient: NLEX 1.090, Meralco 0.959, TNT 0.958) | — | Twice-to-beat in quarterfinals |
| 2 | Meralco Bolts | 8 | 3 | .727 | — | Twice-to-beat in quarterfinals |
| 3 | TNT KaTropa | 8 | 3 | .727 | — | Twice-to-beat in quarterfinals |
| 4 | Barangay Ginebra San Miguel | 7 | 4 | .636 | 1 | Twice-to-beat in quarterfinals |
| 5 | San Miguel Beermen | 6 | 5 | .545 (Note: Head-to-head record: San Miguel 1–0 Magnolia) | 2 | Twice-to-win in quarterfinals |
| 6 | Magnolia Hotshots Pambansang Manok | 6 | 5 | .545 | 2 | Twice-to-win in quarterfinals |
| 7 | Alaska Aces | 5 | 6 | .455 (Note: Head-to-head record: Alaska 1–0 NorthPort) | 3 | Twice-to-win in quarterfinals |
| 8 | NorthPort Batang Pier | 5 | 6 | .455 | 3 | Twice-to-win in quarterfinals |
| 9 | Rain or Shine Elasto Painters | 4 | 7 | .364 (Note: Head-to-head record: Rain or Shine 1–0 Columbian) | 4 | |
| 10 | Kia Picanto | 4 | 7 | .364 | 4 | |
| 11 | Phoenix Pulse Fuel Masters | 3 | 8 | .273 | 5 | |
| 12 | Blackwater Elite | 2 | 9 | .182 | 6 | |

Source: PBA.ph
Rules for classification: 1) winning percentage; 2) if two teams are tied, head to head record; if three or more teams are tied, head-to-head goal average (quotient), if tied for 8th, one-game playoff; 3) overall quotient 4) coin toss>

==== Game log ====
2019 PBA Governors' Cup game log
Total: 5–6
September: 1–1

| Game | Date | Opponent | Score | High points | High rebounds | High assists | Location Attendance | Record |
|---|---|---|---|---|---|---|---|---|
| 1 | September 20 | Rain or Shine | W 99–94 | Mychal Ammons (25) | Mychal Ammons (19) | Robert Bolick (5) | Mall of Asia Arena | 1–0 |
| 2 | September 27 | Magnolia | L 80–96 | Ammons, Ferrer (18) | Mychal Ammons (15) | Robert Bolick (4) | Smart Araneta Coliseum | 1–1 |

October: 2–3

| Game | Date | Opponent | Score | High points | High rebounds | High assists | Location Attendance | Record |
|---|---|---|---|---|---|---|---|---|
| 3 | October 2 | Columbian | L 108–114 | Robert Bolick (23) | Moala Tautuaa (14) | Robert Bolick (10) | Smart Araneta Coliseum | 1–2 |
| 4 | October 5 | Blackwater | L 98–107 | Mychal Ammons (29) | Mychal Ammons (17) | Robert Bolick (8) | Ynares Center | 1–3 |
| 5 | October 9 | TNT | L 100–103 | Garvo Lanete (23) | Mychal Ammons (13) | Anthony, Ammons, Bolick, Ferrer (4) | Cuneta Astrodome | 1–4 |
| 6 | October 12 | Phoenix | W 80–70 | Moala Tautuaa (16) | Moala Tautuaa (9) | Sean Anthony (6) | Smart Araneta Coliseum | 2–4 |
| 7 | October 23 | San Miguel | W 127–119 | Michael Qualls (40) | Michael Qualls (18) | Christian Standhardinger (7) | Cuneta Astrodome | 3–4 |

November: 2–2

| Game | Date | Opponent | Score | High points | High rebounds | High assists | Location Attendance | Record |
|---|---|---|---|---|---|---|---|---|
| 8 | November 3 | Alaska | L 99–106 | Christian Standhardinger (37) | Christian Standhardinger (16) | Nico Elorde (7) | Smart Araneta Coliseum | 3–5 |
| 9 | November 10 | Meralco | L 89–103 | Michael Qualls (27) | Michael Qualls (10) | Sean Anthony (8) | Ynares Center | 3–6 |
| 10 | November 13 | NLEX | W 102–94 | Michael Qualls (36) | Christian Standhardinger (19) | Michael Qualls (5) | Smart Araneta Coliseum | 4–6 |
| 11 | November 17 | Barangay Ginebra | W 98–96 | Michael Qualls (30) | Michael Qualls (13) | Sean Anthony (6) | Smart Araneta Coliseum | 5–6 |

=== Playoffs ===
==== Bracket ====
Quarterfinals
(#1 twice-to-beat)
1 | NLEX | 90 | 123
8 | NorthPort | 115 | 126***
(#4 twice-to-beat)
4 | Barangay Ginebra | 100
5 | San Miguel | 97
(#2 twice-to-beat)
2 | Meralco | 94
7 | Alaska | 84
(#3 twice-to-beat)
3 | TNT | 98
6 | Magnolia | 97

Semifinals (best-of-5)
8 | NorthPort | 1
4 | Barangay Ginebra | 3
2 | Meralco | 3
3 | TNT | 2

Finals (best-of-7)
4 | Barangay Ginebra | 4
2 | Meralco | 1

*Game went into overtime

== Awards ==
| Recipient | Award | Date awarded | Ref. |
|---|---|---|---|
| Sean Anthony | Philippine Cup Player of the Week | January 21, 2019 | |
