= 2019 Phoenix Pulse Fuel Masters season =

- Head coach: Louie Alas
- Owner: Phoenix Petroleum Philippines, Inc.

Philippine Cup results
- Record: 9–2 (81.8%)
- Place: 1st
- Playoff finish: Semifinalist (lost to San Miguel, 1–4)

Commissioner's Cup results
- Record: 4–7 (36.4%)
- Place: 10th
- Playoff finish: Did not qualify

Governors' Cup results
- Record: 3–8 (27.3%)
- Place: 11th
- Playoff finish: Did not qualify

Phoenix Pulse Fuel Masters seasons

The 2019 Phoenix Pulse Fuel Masters season was the 4th season of the franchise in the Philippine Basketball Association (PBA).

== Key dates ==
=== 2018 ===
- December 16: The 2018 PBA draft took place in Midtown Atrium, Robinson Place Manila.

== Draft picks ==
Round	Pick	Player	Position	Nationality	PBA D-League team	College
1	12	Jorey Napoles	F	Philippines	Marinerong Pilipino Skippers	TIP
2	21	Ron Dennison	G	Philippines	Go for Gold	FEU
2	22	Joe Allen Trinidad	G	United States	Wang's Basketball Couriers	FEU
3	26	Ivan Villanueva	F	Philippines	AMA	Adamson
4	36	Kim Cinco	G	Philippines	Zark's Burger	Lyceum

== Roster ==
2019 Phoenix Pulse Fuel Masters roster
Players
Coaches

Pos.	#	POB	Name	Height	Weight	DOB (YYYY–MM–DD)	From
G	1	(Philippines)	Mike Gamboa	5 ft 6 in (1.68 m)	170 lb (77 kg)	1989–02–26	UP Diliman
G	2	(Philippines)	LA Revilla (C / IN)	5 ft 8 in (1.73 m)	146 lb (66 kg)	1989–11–30	De La Salle
F	3	(United States)	Jason Perkins	6 ft 4 in (1.93 m)	235 lb (107 kg)	1992–09–20	De La Salle
G	5	(United States)	Davon Potts	6 ft 2 in (1.88 m)	166 lb (75 kg)	1992–12–27	San Beda
F	7	(Philippines)	JC Intal	6 ft 4 in (1.93 m)	185 lb (84 kg)	1983–11–18	Ateneo
F	8	(Philippines)	Calvin Abueva (S)	6 ft 2 in (1.88 m)	209 lb (95 kg)	1988–02–04	San Sebastian
G/F	11	(United States)	Alex Mallari	6 ft 4 in (1.93 m)	176 lb (80 kg)	1987–03–26	Lewis–Clark State
G	12	(Philippines)	RR Garcia	5 ft 11 in (1.80 m)	165 lb (75 kg)	1990–01–12	Far Eastern
G	13	(Philippines)	RJ Jazul	5 ft 11 in (1.80 m)	170 lb (77 kg)	1986–04–11	Letran
F	15	(Philippines)	Jorey Napoles	6 ft 4 in (1.93 m)		1993–11–27	TIP
C	18	(Philippines)	Justin Chua	6 ft 6 in (1.98 m)	232 lb (105 kg)	1989–07–13	Ateneo
G	21	(Philippines)	Ron Dennison	6 ft 0 in (1.83 m)		1993–11–21	Far Eastern
F/C	22	(Philippines)	Dave Marcelo	6 ft 5 in (1.96 m)	223 lb (101 kg)	1989–02–22	San Beda
F	24	(Philippines)	Rey Guevarra	6 ft 3 in (1.91 m)	190 lb (86 kg)	1986–11–24	Letran
G/F	35	(Canada)	Matthew Wright	6 ft 4 in (1.93 m)	200 lb (91 kg)	1992–02–07	St. Bonaventure

Head coach

- (Philippines) Louie Alas

Assistant coach(es)

- (Philippines) Topex Robinson (1st assistant)
- (Philippines) Carmelo Alas
- (Philippines) Jon Jacinto
- (Philippines) Kristofer Reyes
- (Philippines) Caesar Polhen

Team manager

- (Philippines) Paolo Bugia

Legend

- (C) Team captain
- (CI) Commissioner's Cup Import
- (GI) Governors' Cup Import
- (EI) EASL Import
- (DP) Unsigned draft pick
- (FA) Free agent
- (IN) Inactive
- (S) Suspended
- (R) Rookie
- Injured

Roster

== Philippine Cup ==
=== Eliminations ===
==== Standings ====
Pos	Team	W	L	PCT	GB	Qualification
1	Phoenix Pulse Fuel Masters	9	2	.818	—	Twice-to-beat in the quarterfinals
2	Rain or Shine Elasto Painters	8	3	.727	1	Twice-to-beat in the quarterfinals
3	Barangay Ginebra San Miguel	7	4	.636 (Note: Head-to-head quotient: Barangay Ginebra 1.02, TNT 1.00, San Miguel 0.98)	2	Best-of-three quarterfinals
4	TNT KaTropa	7	4	.636	2	Best-of-three quarterfinals
5	San Miguel Beermen	7	4	.636	2	Best-of-three quarterfinals
6	Magnolia Hotshots Pambansang Manok	6	5	.545	3	Best-of-three quarterfinals
7	NorthPort Batang Pier	5	6	.455	4	Twice-to-win in the quarterfinals
8	Alaska Aces	4	7	.364 (Note: Head-to-head quotient: NLEX 1.19, Alaska 1.01, Columbian 0.84; 8th-seed playoff: Alaska 88–80 NLEX)	5	Twice-to-win in the quarterfinals
9	NLEX Road Warriors	4	7	.364	5	
10	Columbian Dyip	4	7	.364	5	
11	Meralco Bolts	3	8	.273	6	
12	Blackwater Elite	2	9	.182	7	

Source: PBA.ph
Rules for classification: 1) winning percentage; 2) if two teams are tied, head-to-head record; if three or more teams are tied, head-to-head goal average (quotient), if tied for 8th, one-game playoff; 3) overall quotient 4) coin toss

==== Game log ====
2019 PBA Philippine Cup game log
Total: 9–2
January: 3–0

Game	Date	Opponent	Score	High points	High rebounds	High assists	Location Attendance	Record
1	January 16	Meralco	W 93–92 (OT)	Justin Chua (24)	JC Intal (16)	JC Intal (6)	Smart Araneta Coliseum	1–0
2	January 19	TNT	W 93–84 (OT)	Matthew Wright (23)	Jason Perkins (15)	Intal, Mallari, Wright (4)	Ynares Center	2–0
3	January 23	Columbian	W 108–98	Matthew Wright (22)	Jason Perkins (11)	LA Revilla (7)	Smart Araneta Coliseum	3–0

February : 3–1

Game	Date	Opponent	Score	High points	High rebounds	High assists	Location Attendance	Record
4	February 1	Blackwater	W 114–95	Calvin Abueva (22)	Calvin Abueva (14)	Matthew Wright (7)	Ynares Center	4–0
5	February 8	NLEX	W 83–82	Matthew Wright (17)	Abueva, Perkins (11)	Matthew Wright (6)	Mall of Asia Arena	5–0
6	February 10	Rain or Shine	L 94–98 (OT)	Jason Perkins (27)	Calvin Abueva (12)	Matthew Wright (5)	Smart Araneta Coliseum	5–1
7	February 27	NorthPort	W 98–96	Matthew Wright (22)	Justin Chua (9)	Matthew Wright (5)	Smart Araneta Coliseum	6–1

March : 3–1

Game	Date	Opponent	Score	High points	High rebounds	High assists	Location Attendance	Record
8	March 1	Alaska	W 94–80	Calvin Abueva (21)	Calvin Abueva (16)	Alex Mallari (6)	Mall of Asia Arena	7–1
9	March 6	Magnolia	W 89–87	Calvin Abueva (24)	Calvin Abueva (13)	Matthew Wright (6)	Smart Araneta Coliseum	8–1
10	March 10	Barangay Ginebra	L 97–100	Calvin Abueva (15)	Calvin Abueva (11)	Matthew Wright (10)	Smart Araneta Coliseum	8–2
11	March 16	San Miguel	W 96–93	Matthew Wright (25)	Jason Perkins (10)	Alex Mallari (6)	Panabo Multi-Purpose Tourism, Cultural, and Sports Center	9–2

=== Playoffs ===
==== Bracket ====
Quarterfinals
(#1 twice-to-beat)
1	Phoenix	91
8	Alaska	76
(Best-of-3)
4	TNT	1
5	San Miguel	2
(#2 twice-to-beat)
2	Rain or Shine	91
7	NorthPort	85
(Best-of-3)
3	Barangay Ginebra	1
6	Magnolia	2

Semifinals (Best-of-7)
1	Phoenix	1
5	San Miguel	4
2	Rain or Shine	3
6	Magnolia	4

Finals (Best-of-7)
5	San Miguel	4
6	Magnolia	3

==== Game log ====
2019 PBA Philippine Cup playoffs game log
Total: 2–4
Quarterfinals: 1–0

Game	Date	Opponent	Score	High points	High rebounds	High assists	Location Attendance	Series
1	April 7	Alaska	W 91–76	Jason Perkins (31)	Calvin Abueva (11)	Matthew Wright (6)	Mall of Asia Arena	1–0

Semifinals: 1–4

Game	Date	Opponent	Score	High points	High rebounds	High assists	Location Attendance	Series
1	April 13	San Miguel	L 88–100	Matthew Wright (22)	Calvin Abueva (21)	Calvin Abueva (5)	Mall of Asia Arena	0–1
2	April 15	San Miguel	L 82–92	Calvin Abueva (16)	Calvin Abueva (10)	Calvin Abueva (6)	Smart Araneta Coliseum	0–2
3	April 21	San Miguel	W 92–90	Abueva, Wright (18)	Calvin Abueva (13)	Calvin Abueva (5)	Smart Araneta Coliseum	1–2
4	April 23	San Miguel	L 91–114	Calvin Abueva (19)	Calvin Abueva (15)	Abueva, Dennison, Jazul, Wright (3)	Cuneta Astrodome	1–3
5	April 23	San Miguel	L 91–114	Matthew Wright (20)	Justin Chua (11)	LA Revilla (6)	Cuneta Astrodome	1–4

== Commissioner's Cup ==
=== Eliminations ===
==== Standings ====
Pos	Team	W	L	PCT	GB	Qualification
1	TNT KaTropa	10	1	.909	—	Twice-to-beat in the quarterfinals
2	NorthPort Batang Pier	9	2	.818	1	Twice-to-beat in the quarterfinals
3	Blackwater Elite	7	4	.636 (Note: Head-to-head record: Blackwater 1–0 Barangay Ginebra)	3	Best-of-three quarterfinals
4	Barangay Ginebra San Miguel	7	4	.636	3	Best-of-three quarterfinals
5	Magnolia Hotshots Pambansang Manok	5	6	.455 (Note: Head-to-head quotient: Magnolia 1.19, Rain or Shine 1.01, San Miguel 0.83)	5	Best-of-three quarterfinals
6	Rain or Shine Elasto Painters	5	6	.455	5	Best-of-three quarterfinals
7	San Miguel Beermen	5	6	.455	5	Twice-to-win in the quarterfinals
8	Alaska Aces	4	7	.364 (Note: Head-to-head quotient: Alaska 1.012, Meralco 1.011, Phoenix 0.977; 8th-seed playoff: Alaska 108–103 Meralco)	6	Twice-to-win in the quarterfinals
9	Meralco Bolts	4	7	.364	6	
10	Phoenix Pulse Fuel Masters	4	7	.364	6	
11	Columbian Dyip	3	8	.273 (Note: Head-to-head record: Columbian 1–0 NLEX)	7	
12	NLEX Road Warriors	3	8	.273	7	

Source: PBA.ph
Rules for classification: 1) winning percentage; 2) if two teams are tied, head-to-head record; if three or more teams are tied, head-to-head goal average (quotient), if tied for 8th, one-game playoff; 3) overall quotient 4) coin toss

==== Game log ====
2019 PBA Commissioner's Cup game log
Total: 4–7
May: 1–0

Game	Date	Opponent	Score	High points	High rebounds	High assists	Location Attendance	Record
1	May 31	Blackwater	W 103–98	Matthew Wright (22)	Robert Dozier (16)	Matthew Wright (6)	Mall of Asia Arena	1–0

June : 3–4

Game	Date	Opponent	Score	High points	High rebounds	High assists	Location Attendance	Record
2	June 2	TNT	L 88–114	Matthew Wright (21)	Robert Dozier (12)	LA Revilla (5)	Ynares Center	1–1
3	June 7	Meralco	L 95–101	Matthew Wright (20)	Jason Perkins (13)	LA Revilla (5)	Smart Araneta Coliseum	1–2
4	June 9	Rain or Shine	L 82–89	Richard Howell (27)	Richard Howell (11)	Jazul, Wright (5)	Ynares Center	1–3
5	June 15	Alaska	W 78–76	Richard Howell (24)	Richard Howell (29)	Matthew Wright (5)	Smart Araneta Coliseum	2–3
6	June 22	Magnolia	L 96–99	Richard Howell (36)	Richard Howell (20)	Matthew Wright (8)	Cuneta Astrodome	2–4
7	June 26	NorthPort	W 97–87	Matthew Wright (28)	Richard Howell (15)	Alex Mallari (7)	Smart Araneta Coliseum	3–4
8	June 28	Barangay Ginebra	W 111–103	Matthew Wright (32)	Richard Howell (21)	Matthew Wright (6)	Smart Araneta Coliseum	4–4

July : 0–3

Game	Date	Opponent	Score	High points	High rebounds	High assists	Location Attendance	Record
9	July 6	Columbian	L 98–100	Richard Howell (35)	Richard Howell (23)	RJ Jazul (9)	Mall of Asia Arena	4–5
10	July 10	San Miguel	L 108–128	Richard Howell (15)	Richard Howell (14)	Jazul, Mallari (6)	Smart Araneta Coliseum	4–6
11	July 12	NLEX	L 85–87	RJ Jazul (20)	Richard Howell (8)	Jazul, Wright (5)	Cuneta Astrodome	4–7

== Governors' Cup ==
=== Eliminations ===
==== Standings ====
Pos	Team	W	L	PCT	GB	Qualification
1	NLEX Road Warriors	8	3	.727 (Note: Head-to-head quotient: NLEX 1.090, Meralco 0.959, TNT 0.958)	—	Twice-to-beat in quarterfinals
2	Meralco Bolts	8	3	.727	—	Twice-to-beat in quarterfinals
3	TNT KaTropa	8	3	.727	—	Twice-to-beat in quarterfinals
4	Barangay Ginebra San Miguel	7	4	.636	1	Twice-to-beat in quarterfinals
5	San Miguel Beermen	6	5	.545 (Note: Head-to-head record: San Miguel 1–0 Magnolia)	2	Twice-to-win in quarterfinals
6	Magnolia Hotshots Pambansang Manok	6	5	.545	2	Twice-to-win in quarterfinals
7	Alaska Aces	5	6	.455 (Note: Head-to-head record: Alaska 1–0 NorthPort)	3	Twice-to-win in quarterfinals
8	NorthPort Batang Pier	5	6	.455	3	Twice-to-win in quarterfinals
9	Rain or Shine Elasto Painters	4	7	.364 (Note: Head-to-head record: Rain or Shine 1–0 Columbian)	4	
10	Columbian Dyip	4	7	.364	4	
11	Phoenix Pulse Fuel Masters	3	8	.273	5	
12	Blackwater Elite	2	9	.182	6	

Source: PBA.ph
Rules for classification: 1) winning percentage; 2) if two teams are tied, head to head record; if three or more teams are tied, head-to-head goal average (quotient), if tied for 8th, one-game playoff; 3) overall quotient 4) coin toss>

== Transactions ==
=== Free agent signings ===
Player	Contract amount	Date signed	Former team
RR Garcia	Not disclosed	September 16, 2019	TNT KaTropa
Davon Potts	Not disclosed	September 16, 2019	Alaska Aces

=== Awards ===
Recipient	Award	Date awarded	Ref.
Calvin Abueva	Philippine Cup Player of the Week	March 5, 2019	
