= 2019 Rain or Shine Elasto Painters season =

- Head coach: Caloy Garcia
- Owners: Asian Coatings Philippines, Inc.

Philippine Cup results
- Record: 8–3 (72.7%)
- Place: 2nd
- Playoff finish: Semifinalist (lost to Magnolia, 3–4)

Commissioner's Cup results
- Record: 5–6 (45.5%)
- Place: 6th
- Playoff finish: Semifinalist (lost to San Miguel, 1–3)

Governors' Cup results
- Record: 4–7 (36.4%)
- Place: 9th
- Playoff finish: Did not qualify

Rain or Shine Elasto Painters seasons

The 2019 Rain or Shine Elasto Painters season was the 13th season of the franchise in the Philippine Basketball Association (PBA).

== Key dates ==
=== 2018 ===
- December 16: The 2018 PBA draft took place in Midtown Atrium, Robinson Place Manila.

== Draft picks ==
Round	Pick	Player	Position	Nationality	PBA D-League team	College
1	6	Javee Mocon	F	Philippines	Cignal HD - San Beda	San Beda
1	8	Jayjay Alejandro	G	Philippines	Go for Gold Scratchers	National U
2	13	Paul Varilla	F	Philippines	Tanduay Light	UE
2	19	Robbie Manalang	G	Philippines	Marinerong Pilipino	Adamson
2	20	Harold Ng	G	Philippines	AMA	Adamson
3	30	Kent Lao	F	Philippines	Che'Lu Bar and Grill	UST
4	39	Al Josef Cariaga	G	Canada	Zark's Burger	Southern Alberta

== Roster ==
2019 Rain or Shine Elasto Painters roster
Players
Coaches

Pos.	#	POB	Name	Height	Weight	DOB (YYYY–MM–DD)	From
F	1	(Philippines)	Sidney Onwubere	6 ft 4 in (1.93 m)		1993–08–01	Emilio Aguinaldo
F	5	(United States)	Gabe Norwood (C)	6 ft 6 in (1.98 m)	190 lb (86 kg)	1985–02–09	George Mason
G	7	(Philippines)	Jjay Alejandro	6 ft 0 in (1.83 m)	165 lb (75 kg)	1995–04–13	National-U
G	8	(Philippines)	Ed Daquioag	6 ft 0 in (1.83 m)	170 lb (77 kg)	1991–08–18	UST
G	9	(Philippines)	Chris Exciminiano	6 ft 0 in (1.83 m)	185 lb (84 kg)	1988–11–17	Far Eastern
F	10	(Philippines)	Javee Mocon	6 ft 3 in (1.91 m)	189 lb (86 kg)	1995–04–07	San Beda
G	11	(Philippines)	Kris Rosales	6 ft 0 in (1.83 m)	165 lb (75 kg)	1990–12–20	Hope International
F/C	15	(Philippines)	Jewel Ponferada	6 ft 5 in (1.96 m)	211 lb (96 kg)	1988–07–08	National-U
F	16	(Philippines)	Mark Borboran	6 ft 4 in (1.93 m)	185 lb (84 kg)	1984–11–20	UE
G/F	18	(Philippines)	James Yap (injured)	6 ft 3 in (1.91 m)	205 lb (93 kg)	1982–02–15	UE
G	27	(Philippines)	Rey Nambatac	6 ft 0 in (1.83 m)		1994–01–27	Letran
F/C	29	(Canada)	Norbert Torres	6 ft 6 in (1.98 m)	250 lb (113 kg)	1990–01–12	De La Salle
F/C	30	(Philippines)	Beau Belga	6 ft 5 in (1.96 m)	245 lb (111 kg)	1986–11–30	Philippine Christian

Head coach

- (Philippines) Caloy Garcia

Assistant coach(es)

- (Philippines) Chris Gavina (1st assistant)
- (Philippines) Mike Buendia
- (Philippines) Jireh Ibañes
- (Philippines) Ricky Umayam

Team manager

- (Philippines) Mamerto Mondragon
- (Philippines) Jay Legacion (assistant)

Legend

- (C) Team captain
- (CI) Commissioner's Cup Import
- (GI) Governors' Cup Import
- (EI) EASL Import
- (DP) Unsigned draft pick
- (FA) Free agent
- (IN) Inactive
- (S) Suspended
- (R) Rookie
- Injured

Roster

== Philippine Cup ==
=== Eliminations ===
==== Standings ====
Pos	Team	W	L	PCT	GB	Qualification
1	Phoenix Pulse Fuel Masters	9	2	.818	—	Twice-to-beat in the quarterfinals
2	Rain or Shine Elasto Painters	8	3	.727	1	Twice-to-beat in the quarterfinals
3	Barangay Ginebra San Miguel	7	4	.636 (Note: Head-to-head quotient: Barangay Ginebra 1.02, TNT 1.00, San Miguel 0.98)	2	Best-of-three quarterfinals
4	TNT KaTropa	7	4	.636	2	Best-of-three quarterfinals
5	San Miguel Beermen	7	4	.636	2	Best-of-three quarterfinals
6	Magnolia Hotshots Pambansang Manok	6	5	.545	3	Best-of-three quarterfinals
7	NorthPort Batang Pier	5	6	.455	4	Twice-to-win in the quarterfinals
8	Alaska Aces	4	7	.364 (Note: Head-to-head quotient: NLEX 1.19, Alaska 1.01, Columbian 0.84; 8th-seed playoff: Alaska 88–80 NLEX)	5	Twice-to-win in the quarterfinals
9	NLEX Road Warriors	4	7	.364	5	
10	Columbian Dyip	4	7	.364	5	
11	Meralco Bolts	3	8	.273	6	
12	Blackwater Elite	2	9	.182	7	

Source: PBA.ph
Rules for classification: 1) winning percentage; 2) if two teams are tied, head-to-head record; if three or more teams are tied, head-to-head goal average (quotient), if tied for 8th, one-game playoff; 3) overall quotient 4) coin toss

==== Game log ====
2019 PBA Philippine Cup game log
Total: 8–3
January: 2–1

Game	Date	Opponent	Score	High points	High rebounds	High assists	Location Attendance	Record
1	January 18	NLEX	W 96–87	James Yap (20)	Rey Nambatac (10)	Beau Belga (7)	Cuneta Astrodome	1–0
2	January 26	Barangay Ginebra	W 83–80	Borboran, Torres (12)	Borboran, Mocon, Torres (8)	Ahanmisi, Daquioag (4)	Calasiao Sports Complex	2–0
3	January 30	Blackwater	L 99–111	James Yap (20)	Ahanmisi, Mocon (8)	Ahanmisi, Belga (4)	Cuneta Astrodome	2–1

February: 5–0

Game	Date	Opponent	Score	High points	High rebounds	High assists	Location Attendance	Record
4	February 1	San Miguel	W 108–98	James Yap (21)	Javee Mocon (17)	Almazan, Mocon (4)	Ynares Center	3–1
5	February 3	Alaska	W 85–72	Rey Nambatac (12)	Maverick Ahanmisi (14)	Ahanmisi, Belga (5)	Mall of Asia Arena	4–1
6	February 8	NorthPort	W 107–100	Belga, Yap (19)	Maverick Ahanmisi (7)	Beau Belga (7)	Mall of Asia Arena	5–1
7	February 10	Phoenix	W 98–94 (OT)	Belga, Rosales (16)	Beau Belga (9)	Beau Belga (7)	Smart Araneta Coliseum	6–1
8	February 13	Magnolia	W 75–74	James Yap (18)	Raymond Almazan (14)	Ahanmisi, Almazan (3)	Mall of Asia Arena	7–1

March: 1–2

Game	Date	Opponent	Score	High points	High rebounds	High assists	Location Attendance	Record
9	March 3	TNT	L 92–100	James Yap (18)	Ahanmisi, Belga (7)	Belga, Mocon (4)	Ynares Center	7–2
10	March 6	Columbian	L 82–85	Mark Borboran (21)	Javee Mocon (9)	Maverick Ahanmisi (5)	Smart Araneta Coliseum	7–3
11	March 15	Meralco	W 88–85	James Yap (14)	Beau Belga (11)	Ahanmisi, Belga, Mocon, Yap (3)	Cuneta Astrodome	8–3

=== Playoffs ===
==== Bracket ====
Quarterfinals
(#1 twice-to-beat)
1	Phoenix	91
8	Alaska	76
(Best-of-3)
4	TNT	1
5	San Miguel	2
(#2 twice-to-beat)
2	Rain or Shine	91
7	NorthPort	85
(Best-of-3)
3	Barangay Ginebra	1
6	Magnolia	2

Semifinals (Best-of-7)
1	Phoenix	1
5	San Miguel	4
2	Rain or Shine	3
6	Magnolia	4

Finals (Best-of-7)
5	San Miguel	4
6	Magnolia	3

==== Game log ====
2019 PBA Philippine Cup playoffs game log
Total: 4–4
Quarterfinals: 1–0

Game	Date	Opponent	Score	High points	High rebounds	High assists	Location Attendance	Series
1	April 7	NorthPort	W 91–85	Ed Daquioag (15)	Javee Mocon (7)	Belga, Daquioag (4)	Mall of Asia Arena	1–0

Semifinals: 3–4

Game	Date	Opponent	Score	High points	High rebounds	High assists	Location Attendance	Series
1	April 12	Magnolia	W 84–77	Javee Mocon (15)	Javee Mocon (10)	Rey Nambatac (4)	Smart Araneta Coliseum	1–0
2	April 14	Magnolia	W 93–80	Ed Daquioag (19)	Javee Mocon (6)	Gabe Norwood (5)	Smart Araneta Coliseum	2–0
3	April 16	Magnolia	L 74–85	Javee Mocon (18)	Mocon, Norwood (9)	Gabe Norwood (4)	Smart Araneta Coliseum	2–1
4	April 22	Magnolia	L 91–94	James Yap (24)	Gabe Norwood (8)	Beau Belga (3)	Smart Araneta Coliseum	2–2
5	April 24	Magnolia	L 74–82	Gabe Norwood (15)	Beau Belga (10)	Ahanmisi, Belga, Rosales (3)	Cuneta Astrodome	2–3
6	April 26	Magnolia	W 91–81	Nambatac, Yap (16)	Gabe Norwood (10)	Ahanmisi, Belga (4)	Ynares Center	3–3
7	April 28	Magnolia	L 60–63 (OT)	James Yap (14)	Ahanmisi, Norwood (7)	Gabe Norwood (4)	Mall of Asia Arena	3–4

== Commissioner's Cup ==
=== Eliminations ===
==== Standings ====
Pos	Team	W	L	PCT	GB	Qualification
1	TNT KaTropa	10	1	.909	—	Twice-to-beat in the quarterfinals
2	NorthPort Batang Pier	9	2	.818	1	Twice-to-beat in the quarterfinals
3	Blackwater Elite	7	4	.636 (Note: Head-to-head record: Blackwater 1–0 Barangay Ginebra)	3	Best-of-three quarterfinals
4	Barangay Ginebra San Miguel	7	4	.636	3	Best-of-three quarterfinals
5	Magnolia Hotshots Pambansang Manok	5	6	.455 (Note: Head-to-head quotient: Magnolia 1.19, Rain or Shine 1.01, San Miguel 0.83)	5	Best-of-three quarterfinals
6	Rain or Shine Elasto Painters	5	6	.455	5	Best-of-three quarterfinals
7	San Miguel Beermen	5	6	.455	5	Twice-to-win in the quarterfinals
8	Alaska Aces	4	7	.364 (Note: Head-to-head quotient: Alaska 1.012, Meralco 1.011, Phoenix 0.977; 8th-seed playoff: Alaska 108–103 Meralco)	6	Twice-to-win in the quarterfinals
9	Meralco Bolts	4	7	.364	6	
10	Phoenix Pulse Fuel Masters	4	7	.364	6	
11	Columbian Dyip	3	8	.273 (Note: Head-to-head record: Columbian 1–0 NLEX)	7	
12	NLEX Road Warriors	3	8	.273	7	

Source: PBA.ph
Rules for classification: 1) winning percentage; 2) if two teams are tied, head-to-head record; if three or more teams are tied, head-to-head goal average (quotient), if tied for 8th, one-game playoff; 3) overall quotient 4) coin toss

==== Game log ====
2019 PBA Commissioner's Cup game log
Total: 5–6
May: 0–1

Game	Date	Opponent	Score	High points	High rebounds	High assists	Location Attendance	Record
1	May 31	Meralco	L 84–91	Denzel Bowles (31)	Denzel Bowles (13)	Bowles, Mocon (4)	Mall of Asia Arena	0–1

June: 3–3

Game	Date	Opponent	Score	High points	High rebounds	High assists	Location Attendance	Record
2	June 2	Blackwater	L 92–98	Denzel Bowles (27)	James Yap (8)	James Yap (5)	Ynares Center	0–2
3	June 7	Barangay Ginebra	W 104–81	Rey Nambatac (30)	Denzel Bowles (17)	Beau Belga (7)	Smart Araneta Coliseum	1–2
4	June 9	Phoenix	W 89–82	Denzel Bowles (28)	Denzel Bowles (14)	Denzel Bowles (5)	Ynares Center	2–2
5	June 19	NorthPort	L 105–107 (OT)	Denzel Bowles (41)	Denzel Bowles (21)	Javee Mocon (8)	Mall of Asia Arena	2–3
6	June 23	Columbian	W 88–86 (OT)	Denzel Bowles (29)	Denzel Bowles (14)	Denzel Bowles (10)	Batangas City Coliseum	3–3
7	June 28	NLEX	L 97–100	Denzel Bowles (35)	Denzel Bowles (9)	Javee Mocon (8)	Smart Araneta Coliseum	3–4

July: 2–2

Game	Date	Opponent	Score	High points	High rebounds	High assists	Location Attendance	Record
8	July 3	TNT	L 81–102	Denzel Bowles (28)	Javee Mocon (10)	Mocon, Rosales (5)	Smart Araneta Coliseum	3–5
9	July 6	Alaska	W 86–84	Denzel Bowles (16)	Beau Belga (7)	Beau Belga (5)	Mall of Asia Arena	4–5
10	July 10	Magnolia	W 86–82	Beau Belga (22)	Carl Montgomery (12)	Rey Nambatac (5)	Smart Araneta Coliseum	5–5
11	July 13	San Miguel	L 87–89	Javee Mocon (20)	Carl Montgomery (13)	Javee Mocon (5)	Xavier University Gym	5–6

=== Playoffs ===
==== Bracket ====
Quarterfinals
(#1 twice-to-beat)
1	TNT	72	104
8	Alaska	108	93
(Best-of-3)
4	Barangay Ginebra	2
5	Magnolia	0
(#2 twice-to-beat)
2	NorthPort	84	88
7	San Miguel	98	90
(Best-of-3)
3	Blackwater	1
6	Rain or Shine	2

Semifinals (Best-of-5)
1	TNT	3
4	Barangay Ginebra	1
7	San Miguel	3
6	Rain or Shine	1

Finals (Best-of-7)
1	TNT	2
7	San Miguel	4

==== Game log ====
2019 PBA Commissioner's Cup playoffs game log
Total: 3–4
Quarterfinals: 2–1

Game	Date	Opponent	Score	High points	High rebounds	High assists	Location Attendance	Series
1	July 20	Blackwater	W 83–80	Ed Daquioag (19)	Carl Montgomery (19)	Belga, Borboran, Daquioag (3)	Mall of Asia Arena	1–0
2	July 23	Blackwater	L 96–100	Javee Mocon (25)	Carl Montgomery (15)	Kris Rosales (5)	Smart Araneta Coliseum	1–1
3	July 25	Blackwater	W 85–83	Rey Nambatac (21)	Carl Montgomery (23)	Javee Mocon (6)	Smart Araneta Coliseum	2–1

Semifinals: 1–3

Game	Date	Opponent	Score	High points	High rebounds	High assists	Location Attendance	Series
1	July 27	San Miguel	L 105–111	Carl Montgomery (20)	Carl Montgomery (17)	Javee Mocon (8)	Smart Araneta Coliseum	0–1
2	July 29	San Miguel	L 105–117	Carl Montgomery (24)	Carl Montgomery (15)	Carl Montgomery (6)	Mall of Asia Arena	0–2
3	July 31	San Miguel	W 112–104	Carl Montgomery (25)	Carl Montgomery (15)	Beau Belga (6)	Smart Araneta Coliseum	1–2
4	August 2	San Miguel	L 95–98	Carl Montgomery (18)	Carl Montgomery (17)	Carl Montgomery (7)	Smart Araneta Coliseum	1–3

== Governors' Cup ==
=== Eliminations ===
==== Standings ====
Pos	Team	W	L	PCT	GB	Qualification
1	NLEX Road Warriors	8	3	.727 (Note: Head-to-head quotient: NLEX 1.090, Meralco 0.959, TNT 0.958)	—	Twice-to-beat in quarterfinals
2	Meralco Bolts	8	3	.727	—	Twice-to-beat in quarterfinals
3	TNT KaTropa	8	3	.727	—	Twice-to-beat in quarterfinals
4	Barangay Ginebra San Miguel	7	4	.636	1	Twice-to-beat in quarterfinals
5	San Miguel Beermen	6	5	.545 (Note: Head-to-head record: San Miguel 1–0 Magnolia)	2	Twice-to-win in quarterfinals
6	Magnolia Hotshots Pambansang Manok	6	5	.545	2	Twice-to-win in quarterfinals
7	Alaska Aces	5	6	.455 (Note: Head-to-head record: Alaska 1–0 NorthPort)	3	Twice-to-win in quarterfinals
8	NorthPort Batang Pier	5	6	.455	3	Twice-to-win in quarterfinals
9	Rain or Shine Elasto Painters	4	7	.364 (Note: Head-to-head record: Rain or Shine 1–0 Columbian)	4	
10	Columbian Dyip	4	7	.364	4	
11	Phoenix Pulse Fuel Masters	3	8	.273	5	
12	Blackwater Elite	2	9	.182	6	

Source: PBA.ph
Rules for classification: 1) winning percentage; 2) if two teams are tied, head to head record; if three or more teams are tied, head-to-head goal average (quotient), if tied for 8th, one-game playoff; 3) overall quotient 4) coin toss>

==== Game log ====
2019 PBA Governors' Cup game log
Total: 4–7
September: 1–2

Game	Date	Opponent	Score	High points	High rebounds	High assists	Location Attendance	Record
1	September 20	NorthPort	L 94–99	Joel Wright (22)	Joel Wright (14)	Rey Nambatac (5)	Mall of Asia Arena	0–1
2	September 22	Columbian	W 96–90	Joel Wright (30)	Joel Wright (10)	Ed Daquioag (3)	Smart Araneta Coliseum	1–1
3	September 28	TNT	L 91–103	Joel Wright (20)	Joel Wright (8)	Joel Wright (3)	Smart Araneta Coliseum	1–2

October: 1–5

Game	Date	Opponent	Score	High points	High rebounds	High assists	Location Attendance	Record
4	October 4	Magnolia	L 68–69	Javee Mocon (14)	Kayel Locke (9)	Chris Exciminiano (3)	Smart Araneta Coliseum	1–3
5	October 9	Phoenix	L 84–86	Kayel Locke (29)	Javee Mocon (14)	Kayel Locke (4)	Cuneta Astrodome	1–4
6	October 13	Alaska	L 71–78	Kayel Locke (25)	Kayel Locke (10)	Beau Belga (5)	Smart Araneta Coliseum	1–5
7	October 23	Blackwater	W 99–82	Rey Nambatac (18)	Kwame Alexander (16)	Rey Nambatac (7)	Cuneta Astrodome	2–5
8	October 26	Barangay Ginebra	L 89–98	Kwame Alexander (20)	Kwame Alexander (10)	Beau Belga (6)	Smart Araneta Coliseum	2–6
9	October 30	NLEX	L 91–111	Richard Ross (20)	Mocon, Norwood, Ross (8)	Gabe Norwood (5)	Cuneta Astrodome	2–7

November: 2–0

Game	Date	Opponent	Score	High points	High rebounds	High assists	Location Attendance	Record
10	November 9	San Miguel	W 91–85	Mocon, Ross (16)	Javee Mocon (14)	Mocon, Ross (4)	Hoops Dome	3–7
11	November 17	Meralco	W 83–81	Richard Ross (26)	Richard Ross (12)	Belga, Nambatac (4)	Cuneta Astrodome	4–7

== Transactions ==
=== Commissioner's Cup ===
August
August 16, 2019	To Rain or Shine Ping Exciminiano2019 first round pick	To Alaska Maverick Ahanmisi

== Awards ==
Recipient	Award	Date awarded	Ref.
James Yap	Philippine Cup Player of the Week	February 18, 2019	
Javee Mocon	Philippine Cup Rookie of the Month	March 1, 2019	
