= Paolo Taha =

Filipino basketball player

No. 0 – Magnolia Chicken Timplados Hotshots
- Position: Shooting guard
- League: PBA

Personal information
- Born: December 5, 1990 (age 35) Marikina, Philippines
- Listed height: 6 ft 0 in (1.83 m)
- Listed weight: 180 lb (82 kg)

Career information
- College: Benilde
- PBA draft: 2014: 3rd round, 29th overall pick
- Drafted by: Kia Sorento
- Playing career: 2014–present

Career history
- 2014–2016: GlobalPort Batang Pier
- 2016: Mahindra Enforcer
- 2016–2018: Barangay Ginebra San Miguel
- 2018–2025: GlobalPort / NorthPort Batang Pier
- 2025–present: Magnolia Chicken Timplados Hotshots

Career highlights
- PBA champion (2017 Governors')

Juan Paolo S. Taha (born December 5, 1990) is a Filipino basketball player for the Magnolia Chicken Timplados Hotshots of the Philippine Basketball Association (PBA). He was drafted 29th overall by the Kia Sorento in the 2014 PBA draft.

== College career ==
Taha played for the Benilde Blazers in the Philippine NCAA. In Season 89, he scored 24 points in a win against the Mapua Cardinals. He had 13 rebounds in another win against the Arellano Chiefs. In their rematch against Mapua, he had 25 points, 10 rebounds and another win against them. Against the EAC Generals, he injured his right shoulder. The Blazers finished with only five wins.

In Season 90, the Blazers got their first victory of the season after four games. Taha had 24 points and eight rebounds in that win. Along with his teammate Mark Romero, he was named to the NCAA All–Star Game. The Blazers matched their win total from last season in their 9th game when he made a go-ahead layup and grabbed 15 rebounds to beat the Perpetual Help Altas. He then had 27 points, 11 rebounds, and six assists against Arellano. Once again, the Blazers did not make the Final Four. He moved on the PBA after that season.

== Professional career ==
=== GlobalPort Batang Pier ===
While still playing in the NCAA, Taha was drafted 29th overall by Kia in the 2014 PBA draft. But he was unsigned by Kia and was instead picked up by the GlobalPort Batang Pier. Early in his rookie season, he was getting praise for his defense from his superstar teammates Alex Cabagnot and Terrence Romeo.

In his second season, Taha had 11 points, seven rebounds, and six assists in a loss against the Alaska Aces during the 2016 Commissioner's Cup. He then had 16 points off the bench against the Star Hotshots. The Batang Pier did not make the playoffs that conference.

=== Mahindra Enforcer ===
After the Batang Pier were eliminated from the playoffs, Taha, along with Jonathan Uyloan, was traded to the Mahindra Enforcer for guards Karl Dehesa and Michael DiGregorio. He had 10 points as Mahindra got the win in his first meeting against his former team. He was a participant for the Obstacle Challenge of the 2016 PBA All–Star Weekend. During that weekend, he signed a two-year deal with Mahindra. He then had 15 points as the team qualified for the playoffs for the 2016 Governors' Cup. In the playoffs, they lost to the Meralco Bolts.

=== Barangay Ginebra San Miguel ===
After the Governors' conference, Taha was traded to the Barangay Ginebra San Miguel for Denice Villamor and Frank Bonifacio. A year later, he won a championship in the 2017 Governors' Cup.

In Game 1 of the 2017–18 Philippine Cup semifinals against the San Miguel Beermen, Taha injured his knee in the second quarter of that game.

=== NorthPort Batang Pier ===
During the 2018 Commissioner's Cup, Taha was traded back to GlobalPort for Julian Sargent.

In the first game of the 2019 Philippine Cup, Taha had a PBA career-high 21 points, making all nine of his shots. He also had six rebounds in that win against the Blackwater Elite. In that season's Commissioner's Cup, he scored 16 points in a win over the Magnolia Hotshots. That win was also their fifth in six games for that conference. They finished that conference with nine wins and only two losses, but lost to the Beermen in the quarterfinals. In the Governor's Cup, NorthPort made it to the semifinals where he faced his former team Ginebra. In Game 5 of that series, he scored 21 points in the third quarter, finishing with a career-high 29 points, but it wasn't enough as the Batang Pier exited the playoffs.

In the 2020 Philippine Cup, Taha and his team only had one victory, which was against the Terrafirma Dyip.

During the 2021 Philippine Cup, Taha scored 20 points against the TNT Tropang Giga. On February 9, 2022, he signed a three-year contract extension with NorthPort. He almost signed with Meralco, as he was an unrestricted free agent (UFA), but backed out when he saw NorthPort's offer. He then had 19 points as he stepped up in the absence of Robert Bolick in a win over the Phoenix Super LPG Fuel Masters in the Governors' Cup.

== PBA career statistics ==
Legend
GP	Games played	MPG	Minutes per game	FG%	Field-goal percentage
3FG%	3-point field-goal percentage	4P%	4-point field-goal percentage	FT%	Free-throw percentage
RPG	Rebounds per game	APG	Assists per game	SPG	Steals per game
BPG	Blocks per game	PPG	Points per game	127	Career high

As of the end of 2025–26 season

=== Season-by-season averages ===
Year	Team	GP	MPG	FG%	3P%	4P%	FT%	RPG	APG	SPG	BPG	PPG
2014–15	GlobalPort	25	6.5	.361	.286	—	.647	.9	.2	.1	.0	1.6
2015–16	GlobalPort	35	19.0	.517	.200	—	.792	3.4	.9	.3	.3	7.8
2015–16	Mahindra	35	19.0	.517	.200	—	.792	3.4	.9	.3	.3	7.8
2016–17	Barangay Ginebra	37	5.2	.419	.429	—	.800	1.1	.3	.2	.1	2.2
2017–18	Barangay Ginebra	25	13.3	.522	.200	—	.826	2.0	.5	.2	.3	5.5
2017–18	GlobalPort / NorthPort	25	13.3	.522	.200	—	.826	2.0	.5	.2	.3	5.5
2019	NorthPort	40	19.5	.439	.261	—	.704	2.9	1.1	.7	.1	7.6
2020	NorthPort	11	25.8	.417	.150	—	.893	2.4	1.1	.6	—	8.9
2021	NorthPort	23	21.8	.530	.185	—	.704	2.9	.7	.8	.1	8.5
2022–23	NorthPort	25	9.5	.415	.400	—	.500	1.1	.3	.3	.1	2.1
2023–24	NorthPort	10	5.6	.455	.333	—	.667	1.0	.4	.1	—	1.6
2024–25	NorthPort	29	8.4	.532	.375	—	.579	.8	.6	.2	.0	3.5
2025–26	Magnolia	6	6.5	.400	.143	—	1.000	1.0	.5	—	.2	2.2
Career		266	13.1	.472	.254	—	.737	1.9	.6	.3	.1	4.9
