= List of NorthPort Batang Pier seasons =

The NorthPort Batang Pier joined the Philippine Basketball Association (PBA) in 2010 following the acquisition of the Powerade Tigers franchise of Coca-Cola Bottlers Philippines, Inc. by Sultan 900 Capital, Inc. The team began play as the GlobalPort Batang Pier in the 2012–13 PBA season.

== Records per conference ==
Conference champions	Conference runners-up	Conference semifinalists	Playoff berth	Eighth seed playoff

Season	Conference	Elimination round						Playoffs	
Season	Conference	Finish	Played	Wins	Losses	Win %	GB	Round	Results
GlobalPort Batang Pier
2012–13 (team)	Philippine	10th	14	1	13	.071	11	Did not qualify	
2012–13 (team)	Commissioner's	10th	14	2	12	.143	9	Did not qualify	
2012–13 (team)	Governors'	5th	9	4	5	.444	4	Quarterfinals	lost vs. Rain or Shine, 106–108 (Note: Opposing team had a twice-to-beat advantage.)
2013–14 (team)	Philippine	7th	14	5	9	.357	6	Quarterfinals	lost vs. Rain or Shine, 96–106
2013–14 (team)	Commissioner's	10th	9	1	8	.111	8	Did not qualify	
2013–14 (team)	Governors'	10th	9	1	8	.111	6	Did not qualify	
2014–15 (team)	Philippine	8th	11	5	6	.455	4	Quarterfinals 1	lost vs. Barangay Ginebra, 78–95
2014–15 (team)	Commissioner's	10th	11	4	7	.364	4	Did not qualify	
2014–15 (team)	Governors'	4th	11	7	4	.636	1	Quarterfinals	lost vs. Star in two games (Note: Team had a twice-to-beat advantage.)
2015–16 (team)	Philippine	5th	11	7	4	.636	2	Quarterfinals 1 Quarterfinals 2 Semifinals	won vs. Barako Bull, 94–85 won vs. Barangay Ginebra, 84–83 lost vs. Alaska, 1–4
2015–16 (team)	Commissioner's	12th	11	3	8	.273	5	Did not qualify	
2015–16 (team)	Governors'	10th	11	4	7	.364	6	Did not qualify	
2016–17 (team)	Philippine	5th	11	6	5	.545	4	Quarterfinals	lost vs. TNT, 0–2
2016–17 (team)	Commissioner's	8th	11	4	7	.364	5	Eighth seed playoff Quarterfinals	won vs. Alaska, 107–106 lost vs. Barangay Ginebra, 85–96
2016–17 (team)	Governors'	10th	11	3	8	.273	6	Did not qualify	
2017–18 (team)	Philippine	7th	11	5	6	.455	3	Quarterfinals	lost vs. Magnolia, 79–86
2017–18 (team)	Commissioner's	8th	11	5	6	.455	4	Quarterfinals	lost vs. Rain or Shine in two games
NorthPort Batang Pier
2017–18 (team)	Governors'	11th	11	2	9	.182	7	Did not qualify	
2019 (team)	Philippine	7th	11	5	6	.455	4	Quarterfinals	lost vs. Rain or Shine, 85–91
2019 (team)	Commissioner's	2nd	11	9	2	.818	2	Quarterfinals	lost vs. San Miguel in two games
2019 (team)	Governors'	8th	11	5	6	.455	3	Quarterfinals; Semifinals	won vs. NLEX in two games lost vs. Barangay Ginebra, 1–3
2020 (team)	Philippine	11th	11	1	10	.091	7	Did not qualify	
2021 (team)	Philippine	5th	11	6	5	.545	4	Quarterfinals	lost vs. San Miguel, 0–2
2021 (team)	Governors'	9th	11	5	6	.455	4	Eighth seed playoff	lost vs. Phoenix Super LPG, 98–101
2022–23 (team)	Philippine	10th	11	3	8	.273	6	Did not qualify	
2022–23 (team)	Commissioner's	6th	12	6	6	.500	4	Quarterfinals	lost vs. Barangay Ginebra, 0–2
2022–23 (team)	Governors'	9th	11	3	8	.273	7	Did not qualify	
2023–24 (team)	Commissioner's	6th	11	6	5	.545	3	Quarterfinals	lost vs. Barangay Ginebra, 93–106
2023–24 (team)	Philippine	9th	11	5	6	.455	5	Eighth seed playoff	lost vs. Terrafirma, 96–104
2024–25 (team)	Governors'	5th (Group A)	10	3	7	.300	5	Did not qualify	
2024–25 (team)	Commissioner's	1st	12	9	3	.750	—	Quarterfinals; Semifinals	won vs. Magnolia, 113–110 lost vs. Barangay Ginebra, 1–4
2024–25 (team)	Philippine	11th	11	2	9	.182	6	Did not qualify	
Elimination round record			356	137	219	.385		18 playoff appearances	
Playoff record			41	10	31	.244		0 finals appearances	
Cumulative record			397	147	250	.370		0 championships	

== Records per season ==
Season	Stage	Played	Wins	Losses	Win %	Best finish
2012–13 (team)	Elimination round	37	7	30	.189	Quarterfinals
2012–13 (team)	Playoffs	1	0	1	.000	Quarterfinals
2012–13 (team)	Overall	38	7	31	.184	Quarterfinals
2013–14 (team)	Elimination round	32	7	25	.219	Quarterfinals
2013–14 (team)	Playoffs	1	0	1	.000	Quarterfinals
2013–14 (team)	Overall	33	7	26	.212	Quarterfinals
2014–15 (team)	Elimination round	33	16	17	.485	Quarterfinals
2014–15 (team)	Playoffs	3	0	3	.000	Quarterfinals
2014–15 (team)	Overall	36	16	20	.444	Quarterfinals
2015–16 (team)	Elimination round	33	14	19	.424	Semifinals
2015–16 (team)	Playoffs	7	3	4	.429	Semifinals
2015–16 (team)	Overall	40	17	23	.425	Semifinals
2016–17 (team)	Elimination round	33	13	20	.394	Quarterfinals
2016–17 (team)	Playoffs	4	1	3	.250	Quarterfinals
2016–17 (team)	Overall	37	14	23	.378	Quarterfinals
2017–18 (team)	Elimination round	33	12	21	.364	Quarterfinals
2017–18 (team)	Playoffs	3	1	2	.333	Quarterfinals
2017–18 (team)	Overall	36	13	23	.361	Quarterfinals
2019 (team)	Elimination round	33	19	14	.576	Semifinals
2019 (team)	Playoffs	9	3	6	.333	Semifinals
2019 (team)	Overall	42	22	20	.524	Semifinals
2020 (team)	Elimination round	11	1	10	.091	Elimination round (11th place)
2020 (team)	Playoffs	Did not qualify				Elimination round (11th place)
2020 (team)	Overall	11	1	10	.091	Elimination round (11th place)
2021 (team)	Elimination round	22	11	11	.500	Quarterfinals
2021 (team)	Playoffs	3	0	3	.000	Quarterfinals
2021 (team)	Overall	25	11	14	.440	Quarterfinals
2022–23 (team)	Elimination round	34	12	22	.353	Quarterfinals
2022–23 (team)	Playoffs	2	0	2	.000	Quarterfinals
2022–23 (team)	Overall	36	12	24	.333	Quarterfinals
2023–24 (team)	Elimination round	22	11	11	.500	Quarterfinals
2023–24 (team)	Playoffs	2	0	2	.000	Quarterfinals
2023–24 (team)	Overall	24	11	13	.458	Quarterfinals
2024–25 (team)	Elimination round	33	14	19	.424	Semifinals
2024–25 (team)	Playoffs	6	2	4	.333	Semifinals
2024–25 (team)	Overall	39	16	23	.410	Semifinals
