= Terrence Romeo =

Filipino basketball player (born 1992)

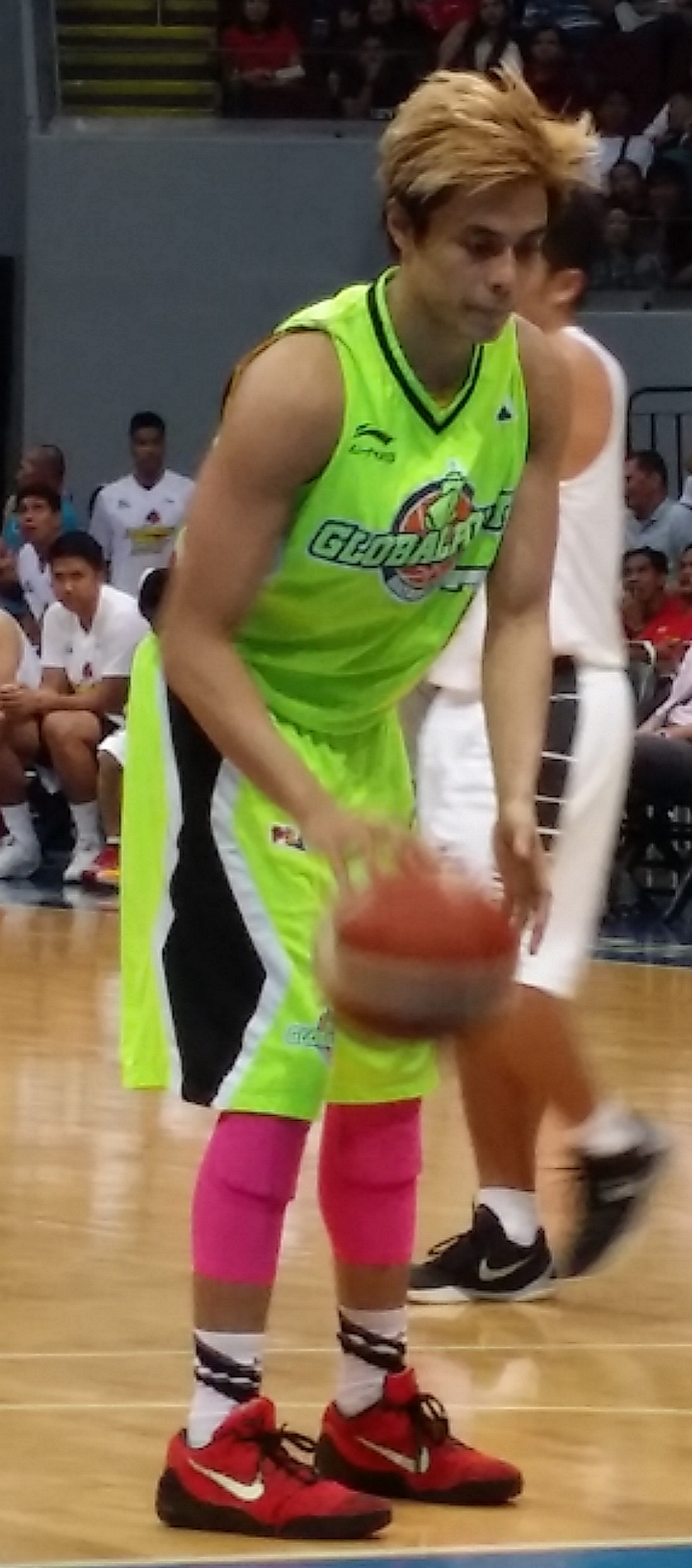
- Romeo with GlobalPort in 2015

Free agent
- Position: Point guard / shooting guard

Personal information
- Born: March 16, 1992 (age 34) Imus, Cavite, Philippines
- Listed height: 5 ft 11 in (1.80 m)
- Listed weight: 180 lb (82 kg)

Career information
- High school: Letran (Manila) (2006-2008); FEU-FERN (Quezon City) (2009)
- College: FEU
- PBA draft: 2013: 1st round, 5th overall pick
- Drafted by: Barako Bull Energy Cola
- Playing career: 2013–present
- Coaching career: 2025–present

Career history

Playing
- 2013–2018: GlobalPort Batang Pier
- 2018: TNT KaTropa
- 2019–2024: San Miguel Beermen
- 2024–2025: Terrafirma Dyip

Coaching
- 2025: PSP Gymers

Career highlights
- 3× PBA champion (2019 Philippine, 2019 Commissioner's, 2023–24 Commissioner's); PBA Finals MVP (2019 Commissioner's); 7× PBA All-Star (2015–2019, 2023, 2024); 3× PBA All-Star Game MVP (2015, 2017 Visayas, 2018 Luzon); PBA Mythical First Team (2016); PBA Mythical Second Team (2015); PBA All-Rookie Team (2014); PBA Most Improved Player (2015); 3× PBA Scoring Champion (2015–2017); 2× PBA All-Star Three-Point Shootout champion (2015, 2016); PBA Mr. Quality Minutes (2019); UAAP Most Valuable Player (2013); 2× UAAP Mythical Team (2012, 2013); UAAP Rookie of the Year (2010)

Terrence Bill Vitanzos Romeo (born March 16, 1992) is a Filipino professional basketball player who last played for the Terrafirma Dyip of the Philippine Basketball Association (PBA). He plays both the point guard and shooting guard positions.

He played as a point guard for the Far Eastern University before being selected fifth overall in the 2013 PBA draft by Barako Bull. He won the 2010 UAAP Rookie of the Year, was a member of the UAAP Mythical Team during his junior and senior years, and was the 2013 UAAP men's basketball Most Valuable Player.

He is also a 3x3 player, playing for Philippine-based teams in the FIBA 3x3 Men's Pro Circuit.

In 2025, he made his coaching debut with the PSP Gymers of the Women's Maharlika Pilipinas Basketball League (WMPBL).

== Amateur career ==
=== High school career ===
Romeo first played for the Letran Squires before he was scouted by Far Eastern University - Diliman. He played only one season as a Baby Tamaraw before graduating to the seniors division. He was known for scoring the UAAP Juniors basketball record of 83 points, eclipsing the previous record of 69 points held by former Junior Maroons player Paolo Mendoza. He won the UAAP Juniors' Most Valuable Player (2009) that same year, with averages of 37.1 ppg, 4.1 apg and 4.0 spg.

=== College career ===
In his first season, Romeo was teammates with then-UAAP MVP RR Garcia. His shooting percentage was 32 percent and he averaged 9.9 points in his rookie season. He was named the Top Rookie for that season.

He averaged 11.4 points, 4.8 rebounds and 3.2 assists in UAAP Season 74, with his FEU team losing a best-of-3 series against Ateneo.

In UAAP Season 75, Romeo averaged a team-best 18.5 points and 5.5 rebounds. His performance landed him a spot in the Mythical Five.

In his final year, UAAP Season 76, he became one of only three players since 2003 (Patrick Cabahug and Bobby Ray Parks Jr.) to score 30 points more than once (he did it three times). He was awarded as Most Valuable Player, becoming only the third guard to win the award following Garcia and Johnny Abarrientos. He averaged 22.2 points (1st), 6.3 rebounds, 3.9 assists (3rd) and 1.6 steals (1st).

While in college, he joined the Big Chill Super Chargers of the PBA D-League.

He elected to forgo his final playing year, after realizing that he would have to wait until 2015 to get drafted to the PBA.

== Professional career ==
=== GlobalPort Batang Pier (2013–2018) ===
==== Rookie Year ====
Romeo was selected by GlobalPort as their 5th overall pick. He chose the same number 7 jersey he wore in college, explaining that Robert Jaworski, who used the same jersey number, was his father's idol. In only his second game as a pro, he scored 34 points in a win against Air21 Express.

Veteran Mark Caguioa noted that Romeo was his closest comparison among young players. Romeo later admitted that Caguioa was one of his idols growing up.

==== Sophomore Year ====
Romeo lost 25 pounds before the beginning of the season. Together with veteran guard Alex Cabagnot and top rookie Stanley Pringle, GlobalPort was expected to make it deeper into the playoffs in their first conference. Before the start of the playoffs, Cabagnot was traded for former GlobalPort player Sol Mercado from the San Miguel Beermen. GlobalPort eventually lost to Ginebra in phase one of the quarter finals.

He led the locals in points per game in the 2015 PBA Commissioner's Cup, averaging 21.36 points. During All-Star Weekend in Puerto Princesa, he scored 50 points in a losing effort in the Rookies vs Sophomores blitz game. He was also the PBA Three-Point Shootout champion (2015) and the PBA All-Star Game MVP (2015).

After leading GlobalPort to its best finish in 2015 PBA Governors' Cup, Romeo was awarded Most Improved Player. He ended the third conference and the season as the top local scorer. He he was also named to the PBA Mythical Second Team (2015).

==== Third Season ====
In Romeo's third season in PBA, he averaged 24.06 points while leading GlobalPort to its first ever semi-finals appearance. GlobalPort lost the series to Alaska. He scored a career-high 41 points in Game 1, his team's only win in the series.

On October 14, 2016, Romeo was named to the PBA Mythical First Team.

=== TNT KaTropa (2018) ===
In 2018, after disagreeing with coach Pido Jarencio, he requested to be traded. He was traded to TNT KaTropa with Yousef Taha in exchange of Moala Tautuaa.

=== San Miguel Beermen (2019–2024) ===
On December 16, 2018, He was traded to San Miguel Beermen, in exchange for Brian Heruela and David Semerad. In his first game with the Beermen, Romeo recorded 7 points and 4 assists in 11 minutes of playing time in a 124–118 loss to the Columbian Dyip.

In Game 2 of the 2019 Commissioner's Cup Finals, Romeo came off the bench and scored 29 points and made six 3-pointers in a 127-125 double overtime win.

On September 20, 2023, Romeo signed a two-year contract extension with the team.

=== Terrafirma Dyip (2024–2025) ===
On November 25, 2024, Romeo was traded to the Terrafirma Dyip along with Vic Manuel for Andreas Cahilig and Juami Tiongson. He remarked that this is one of his saddest moment in career but nevertheless committed to play for his new team Terrafirma.

== PBA career statistics ==
Legend
GP	Games played	MPG	Minutes per game	FG%	Field-goal percentage
3FG%	3-point field-goal percentage	4P%	4-point field-goal percentage	FT%	Free-throw percentage
RPG	Rebounds per game	APG	Assists per game	SPG	Steals per game
BPG	Blocks per game	PPG	Points per game	127	Career high

As of the end of 2024–25 season

Led the league

=== Season-by-season averages ===
Year	Team	GP	MPG	FG%	3P%	4P%	FT%	RPG	APG	SPG	BPG	PPG
2013–14	GlobalPort	30	27.0	.343	.256	—	.741	3.0	2.2	.6	.1	12.4
2014–15	GlobalPort	35	31.4	.403	.307	—	.763	3.5	3.0	.9	.1	19.7
2015–16	GlobalPort	37	35.4	.429	.359	—	.805	3.9	4.0	.9	.1	24.9
2016–17	GlobalPort	31	33.9	.410	.352	—	.856	3.7	5.6	1.0	.2	23.3
2017–18	GlobalPort	23	27.5	.399	.329	—	.763	3.2	5.1	1.1	.2	16.7
2017–18	TNT	23	27.5	.399	.329	—	.763	3.2	5.1	1.1	.2	16.7
2019	San Miguel	48	23.6	.388	.328	—	.711	2.4	3.1	.6	.1	12.0
2020	San Miguel	3	23.4	.436	.300	—	1.000	2.7	3.3	.3	—	13.7
2021	San Miguel	26	28.2	.406	.282	—	.823	2.9	3.8	.9	.1	14.6
2022–23	San Miguel	8	17.1	.397	.432	—	.882	1.1	1.6	.5	.1	11.1
2023–24	San Miguel	30	20.8	.399	.294	—	.674	1.8	3.2	.4	.0	12.0
2024–25	San Miguel	27	19.2	.366	.444	.261	.773	1.5	1.6	.1	.1	8.9
2024–25	Terrafirma	27	19.2	.366	.444	.261	.773	1.5	1.6	.1	.1	8.9
Career		298	28.0	.400	.330	.261	.778	2.8	3.4	.7	.1	16.0

== 3x3 career ==
=== 2014 FIBA 3x3 World Tour ===
==== Manila Masters ====
Playing for Manila West, Romeo teamed up with national team players Niño Canaleta, Rey Guevarra and Aldrech Ramos and Raphael De Vera.

Manila West won the 2014 FIBA 3x3 World Tour Manila Masters tournament, resulting in automatic qualification for the World Tour Masters in Tokyo. There, they faced the top two teams of each of the five stops of the tour.

==== World Tour Final ====
Manila West lost in the knockout stage of 2014 FIBA 3x3 World Tour Final, falling to Slovenian squad Kranj 21–12 in the quarterfinals. They started as the 10th seed and ended the tournament in 5th place.

Romeo placed 11th overall in terms of scoring output out of the 290 players that participated in that year's edition of the 3×3 World Tour. The international basketball body named Romeo as the top 3x3 player outside of Europe, Americas, and Qatar. This earned his team a spot in the All-Star exhibition. He is ranked number one in the Philippines.

=== 2015 FIBA 3x3 World Tour ===
==== Manila Masters ====
Romeo won the three-point shootout and was named the MVP of the event after leading all scorers with 43 points in four games. Manila West lost to Manila North in the semi-finals.

=== 2025 FIBA 3x3 World Tour ===
Romeo suited up for Manila Melmac team for the Manila Challenger of the 2025 FIBA 3x3 World Tour season.

== National team career ==
Romeo was named to the Gilas Pilipinas 3.0 training pool in 2015, and joined the team for a pocket tournament in Estonia. He also saw action in the 2015 William Jones Cup, averaging 15.2 points in 18 minutes during the tournament.

Following the Jones Cup, he was named to the Gilas final lineup that competed in the 2015 FIBA Asia Championship.

== Coaching career ==
On January 19, 2025, Romeo made his coaching debut, serving as the head coach for the PSP Gymers of the newly established Women's Maharlika Pilipinas Basketball League alongside assistant coaches Vic Manuel, CJ Perez, and Arvin Tolentino.
