= 2015 PBA All-Star Weekend =

North All-Stars	South All-Stars
166	161
	1	2	3	4	Total
North All-Stars	41	40	44	41	166
South All-Stars	48	40	47	26	161
- Date: March 6–8, 2015
- Venue: Puerto Princesa Coliseum, Puerto Princesa
- MVP: Terrence Romeo (GlobalPort Batang Pier)
- Network: TV5

The 2015 PBA All-Star Weekend, also known as the 2015 Smart-PBA All-Star for sponsorship reasons, was the annual all-star weekend of the Philippine Basketball Association (PBA)'s 2014–15 season. The events were held at the Puerto Princesa Coliseum in Puerto Princesa, Palawan. This was the second time that Puerto Princesa hosted the all-star weekend. Highlighting the weekend was the return of the North vs. South format of the All-Star game.

== All-Star Weekend (Friday events) ==
=== Rookies vs. Sophomores game ===
The Rookies vs. Sophomores game was the main attraction for the Friday events. The last edition of this event was held in 2011. The following rules were observed during the game:

1. The game consists of four 10-minute quarters. The time will be running during dead ball situations except for the last two minutes of each quarter.
2. The shot clock is reduced to 18 seconds.
3. The time limit for a team to advance the ball over the center line is reduced to six seconds.
4. No players will be fouled out. However, after the seventh personal foul of the player, the team will be put automatically to penalty.
5. Two free throws will be given to a player who was fouled if it is not act of shooting, three free throws if it is from a missed shot, four free throws if the missed shot came from the three-point area.
6. One timeout is given to each team for the first to third quarters and two timeouts are given to each team for the fourth quarter. Also, the teams will have a thirty-second timeout for each half.
7. Dunks are scored as three points.

Rookies
Pos.	Player	Team
F	Ronald Pascual	San Miguel Beermen
F/G	Matt Ganuelas-Rosser	Talk 'N Text Tropang Texters
G	Stanley Pringle	GlobalPort Batang Pier
G	Kevin Alas	Talk 'N Text Tropang Texters
F/C	Jake Pascual	Barako Bull Energy
G	Chris Banchero	Alaska Aces
F	Anthony Semerad	GlobalPort Batang Pier
G	Brian Heruela	Blackwater Elite
Head coach: Peter Martin (San Miguel Beermen)

Sophomores
Pos.	Player	Team
G	Justin Melton	Purefoods Star Hotshots
C	Raymond Almazan	Rain or Shine Elasto Painters
F	Eric Camson	NLEX Road Warriors
G	Jeric Fortuna	San Miguel Beermen
F	Alex Nuyles	Blackwater Elite
G	Terrence Romeo	GlobalPort Batang Pier
G	RR Garcia	Barako Bull Energy
G	LA Revilla	Kia Carnival
Head coach: Jeffrey Cariaso (Alaska Aces)

==== Game ====
Sports5

March 6
7:00pm

Rookies 150, Sophomores 131
Pts: Kevin Alas 35	Pts: Terrence Romeo 50
Matt Ganuelas-Rosser was named as the game's MVP.

Puerto Princesa Coliseum, Puerto Princesa

=== Obstacle Challenge ===
Contestants
Pos.	Player	Team	Height	Weight	First round	Final round
G	Jeric Fortuna	San Miguel Beermen	5–8	150	32s	32.1s
G	Jonas Villanueva	NLEX Road Warriors	6–0	170	34s	37.7s
G	Chris Banchero	Alaska Aces	6–1	185	28s	45s
G	Brian Heruela	Blackwater Elite	5–10	195	37s	
G	Jayson Castro	Talk 'N Text Tropang Texters	5–11	185	37s	
G	LA Revilla	Kia Carnival	5–8	165	38s	
F	Simon Atkins	Meralco Bolts	5–11	185	38s	
G	Mark Barroca	Purefoods Star Hotshots	5–11	170	38s	
G	Paul Lee	Rain or Shine Elasto Painters	6–0	200	39s	
G	LA Tenorio	Barangay Ginebra San Miguel	5–7	155	42s	
G	Stanley Pringle	GlobalPort Batang Pier	6–1	185	44s	

- Gold represent the current champion.
- Jeric Fortuna won in this year's Obstacle Challenge

=== Three-Point Contest ===
Contestants
Pos.	Player	Team	Height	Weight	First round	Final round
G	Terrence Romeo	GlobalPort Batang Pier	5–11	190	18	18
G	James Yap	Purefoods Star Hotshots	6–3	205	18	14
G	JC Intal	Barako Bull Energy	6–4	195	18	11
G	Mark Macapagal	Meralco Bolts	6–2	185	16	
G	Jimmy Alapag	Talk 'N Text Tropang Texters*	5–9	160	15	
G	Niño Canaleta	NLEX Road Warriors	6–6	200	15	
G	Chris Tiu	Rain or Shine Elasto Painters	5–11	170	14	
G	LA Tenorio	Barangay Ginebra San Miguel	5–7	155	13	
G	LA Revilla	Kia Carnival	5–6	165	10	
G	Brian Heruela	Blackwater Elite	5–10	195	10	
G	Chris Banchero	Alaska Aces	6–1	195	9	
F	Arwind Santos	San Miguel Beermen	6–4	175	6	

- Gold represent current champion.
- Terrence Romeo won in this year's Three Point Shootout

=== Slam Dunk Contest ===
Contestants
Pos.	Player	Team	Height	Weight	First round	Final round
G	Rey Guevarra	Meralco Bolts	6–2	210	93 (45+48)	99 (49+50)
F	Japeth Aguilar	Barangay Ginebra San Miguel	6–9	225	95 (50+45)	97 (47+50)
F	Matt Ganuelas-Rosser	Talk 'N Text Tropang Texters	6–5	186	91 (46+45)	
F/G	JC Intal	Barako Bull Energy	6–4	195	90 (45+45)	
G	Justin Melton	Purefoods Star Hotshots	5–9	165	70 (25+45)	
F	Chris Ellis^{INJ}	Barangay Ginebra San Miguel	6–5	185		
F	Niño Canaleta^{OUT}	NLEX Road Warriors	6–6	200		

- Gold represent the current champion.
- Rey Guevarra won in this event, earning his second consecutive title.

^OUT Canaleta did not participate due to a worn-out knee.
^INJ Ellis did not participate due to a swollen ankle injury.

== All-Star Game ==
=== Coaches ===
Leo Austria, coach of the San Miguel Beermen, and Alex Compton, coach of the Alaska Aces, were selected as the North and the South head coach, respectively. As with the past All-Star Games, the coaches of the teams who entered the season's Philippine Cup Finals will coach the all-star teams.

=== Roster ===
The rosters for the All-Star Game were chosen in two ways. The starters were chosen via a fan ballot (online and at the venue during PBA games). Players are assigned to represent the North or South All-Star teams based from their place of birth. Players born in Luzon are assigned to the North All-Stars team while players born in Visayas and Mindanao are assigned to represent the South All-Stars. If the player is born outside the Philippines, the player is assigned to his parents' birthplace. Two guards and three frontcourt players who received the highest vote were named the All-Star starters. The reserves are voted by the twelve PBA coaches after the results of the fan ballot are released.

June Mar Fajardo of the San Miguel Beermen received the most number of fan ballots with 38,107 votes, which earned him a starting position as a center/forward in the South All-Stars team. Asi Taulava of the NLEX Road Warriors earned a record 13th All-Star selection. Taulava, Greg Slaughter, James Yap and Mark Barroca completed the South All-Stars.

The North All-Stars' leading vote-getter was Purefoods Star Hotshots' Marc Pingris, who finished with 23,947. Japeth Aguilar, Mark Caguioa, Justin Melton and Calvin Abueva completed the starting position for the North All-Stars.

Jimmy Alapag, who announced his retirement on January 9, 2015 has been added as the 13th man of the South All-Stars by PBA commissioner Chito Salud. He is the current team manager of his former team, the Talk 'N Text Tropang Texters. The retirement of his #3 jersey by Talk 'N Text is also scheduled to be held during the All-Star game.

North All-Stars
Pos	Player	Team	No. of selections	Votes
Starters
G	Mark Caguioa^{INJ}	Barangay Ginebra San Miguel	7	15,076
G	Justin Melton	Purefoods Star Hotshots	1	12,312
F	Marc Pingris	Purefoods Star Hotshots	9	23,947
F/C	Japeth Aguilar	Barangay Ginebra San Miguel	3	18,334
F	Calvin Abueva	Alaska Aces	3	22,670
Reserves
F/C	Beau Belga	Rain or Shine Elasto Painters	3	—
G	Paul Lee	Rain or Shine Elasto Painters	3	—
F	Gabe Norwood	Rain or Shine Elasto Painters	7	—
G	Jayson Castro^{ST1}	Talk 'N Text Tropang Texters	3	—
F/C	Ranidel de Ocampo	Talk 'N Text Tropang Texters	8	—
F	Arwind Santos	San Miguel Beermen	8	—
G	Terrence Romeo	GlobalPort Batang Pier	1	—
G	LA Tenorio^{REP1}	Barangay Ginebra San Miguel	6	—
Head coach: Leo Austria (San Miguel Beermen)

South All-Stars
Pos	Player	Team	No. of selections	Votes
Starters
G	James Yap	Purefoods Star Hotshots	12	22,937
G	Mark Barroca	Purefoods Star Hotshots	3	15,197
F	Greg Slaughter	Barangay Ginebra San Miguel	2	31,310
F/C	June Mar Fajardo^{INJ}	San Miguel Beermen	3	38,107
F	Asi Taulava	NLEX Road Warriors	13	24,062
Reserves
G	Jeffrei Chan	Rain or Shine Elasto Painters	3	—
G	Cyrus Baguio	Alaska Aces	7	—
G	Dondon Hontiveros^{INJ}	Alaska Aces	12	—
F/C	Joe Devance^{ST2}	Purefoods Star Hotshots	4	—
G	Peter June Simon	Purefoods Star Hotshots	5	—
G	Stanley Pringle	GlobalPort Batang Pier	1	—
F/C	Reynel Hugnatan	Meralco Bolts	6	—
G	Jimmy Alapag	Talk 'N Text Tropang Texters^{1}	12	—
Head coach: Alex Compton (Alaska Aces)

- INJ Caguioa, Hontiveros and Fajardo were unable to participate due to injury.
- ^1 Alapag played for Talk 'N Text in the Philippine Cup. He now serves as its team manager.
- ^ST1 Jayson Castro started in place of Mark Caguioa
- ^ST2 Joe Devance started in place of June Mar Fajardo
- REP1 Tenorio was named as Caguioa's replacement

=== Game ===
Sports5

March 8
4:00pm

Report

North All-Stars 166, South All-Stars 161
Scoring by quarter: 41–48, 40–40, 44–47, 41–26
Pts: Calvin Abueva 37; Rebs: Calvin Abueva 16; Asts: Calvin Abueva 7	Pts: PJ Simon 24; Rebs: Asi Taulava 15; Asts: Jimmy Alapag 17

Puerto Princesa Coliseum, Puerto Princesa

- All-Star Game MVP: Terrence Romeo (North)

== See also ==
- 2014–15 PBA season
- Philippine Basketball Association
- Philippine Basketball Association All-Star Weekend
