= Anthony Semerad =

Filipino basketball player

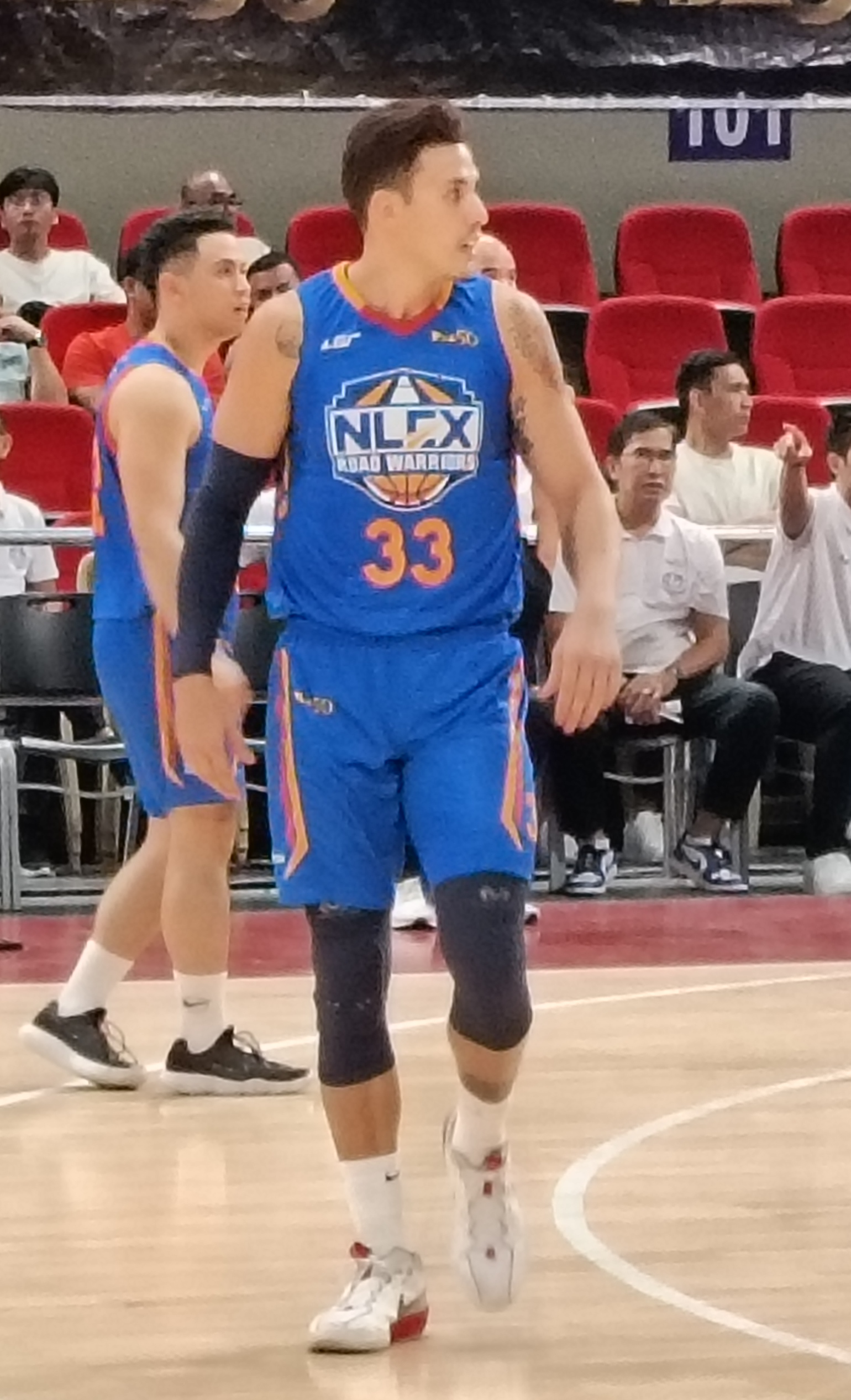
- Semerad with NLEX in 2025

No. 33 – NLEX Road Warriors
- Position: Power forward / small forward
- League: PBA

Personal information
- Born: April 25, 1991 (age 35) Australia
- Listed height: 6 ft 4 in (1.93 m)
- Listed weight: 230 lb (104 kg)

Career information
- High school: John Paul College (Brisbane, Queensland)
- College: San Beda
- PBA draft: 2014: 1st round, 7th overall pick
- Drafted by: San Mig Super Coffee Mixers
- Playing career: 2014–present

Career history
- 2014–2017: GlobalPort Batang Pier
- 2017–2019: TNT KaTropa
- 2020–present: NLEX Road Warriors

Career highlights
- 4× NCAA Philippines champion (2010, 2011, 2013, 2014); NCAA Philippines Finals MVP (2014)

Anthony Paul David Semerad (born April 25, 1991) is an Australian-born Filipino professional basketball player for the NLEX Road Warriors of the Philippine Basketball Association (PBA). He is also a model and TV host. His twin brother, David, who was his teammate in San Beda is also a professional basketball player for the Blackwater Bossing.

The Semerad twins were born to a Czech father and Filipino mother from Pampanga and raised in Australia. They both studied at San Beda College, graduating with Business Marketing degrees.

== College career ==
The Semerad twins were first recruited by San Beda in 2009. In their first three years with the Red Lions, the brothers were part of a team that had a historical 18–0 season, and two back-to-back championships.

In late 2011, they both left the team due to a falling out with the coaching staff, and opted to play for the Ateneo de Manila University Blue Eagles in the UAAP. Despite having to sit out two seasons before becoming eligible, the twins were actively practicing with the Blue Eagles, and participated in off-season tournaments such as the Father Martin's Summer Cup as part of Ateneo's Team B. After sitting out one season, they decided to go back to San Beda. With them back in the fold, they won back-to-back titles in NCAA Seasons 89 and 90. He ended his college career with a Finals MVP in his belt.

== Professional career ==
=== GlobalPort Batang Pier ===
Semerad was picked 7th overall by GlobalPort Batang Pier in the 2014 PBA draft. On October 26, 2014, days after winning the championship for San Beda, he played his first PBA game with a win against Barako Bull, finishing with 7 points and 6 rebounds.

=== TNT Katropa ===
On May 6, 2017, Semerad was a part of a four-team trade between the NLEX Road Warriors, GlobalPort Batang Pier, Meralco Bolts and TNT KaTropa that sent him to the KaTropa along with Larry Fonacier and J. R. Quiñahan to the Road Warriors, Garvo Lanete to the Bolts, and Bradwyn Guinto, Sean Anthony and Jonathan Grey all to the Batang Pier. As the team's new wing and import stopper, he helped the KaTropa reach the finals of the 2017 Commissioner's Cup but lost to the San Miguel Beermen in six games. On October 4, 2018, he signed a three-year contract extension.

== PBA career statistics ==
Legend
| GP | Games played | MPG | Minutes per game | FG% | Field-goal percentage |
| 3FG% | 3-point field-goal percentage | 4P% | 4-point field-goal percentage | FT% | Free-throw percentage |
| RPG | Rebounds per game | APG | Assists per game | SPG | Steals per game |
| BPG | Blocks per game | PPG | Points per game | 127 | Career high |

As of the end of 2024–25 season

=== Season-by-season averages ===
| Year | Team | GP | MPG | FG% | 3P% | 4P% | FT% | RPG | APG | SPG | BPG | PPG |
|---|---|---|---|---|---|---|---|---|---|---|---|---|
| 2014–15 | GlobalPort | 31 | 21.6 | .408 | .383 | — | .667 | 2.1 | .7 | .4 | .0 | 4.9 |
| 2015–16 | GlobalPort | 32 | 16.2 | .381 | .325 | — | .867 | 2.0 | .6 | .3 | — | 4.5 |
| 2016–17 | GlobalPort | 39 | 20.4 | .422 | .408 | — | .704 | 2.2 | .4 | .4 | .1 | 6.3 |
| 2016–17 | TNT | 39 | 20.4 | .422 | .408 | — | .704 | 2.2 | .4 | .4 | .1 | 6.3 |
| 2017–18 | TNT | 31 | 23.6 | .412 | .368 | — | .789 | 3.4 | .6 | .6 | .1 | 8.2 |
| 2019 | TNT | 26 | 16.2 | .342 | .289 | — | .667 | 2.3 | .3 | .3 | .0 | 4.4 |
| 2020 | NLEX | 11 | 20.6 | .392 | .286 | — | .500 | 3.5 | .7 | .5 | — | 6.5 |
| 2021 | NLEX | 21 | 22.1 | .364 | .313 | — | .739 | 3.0 | .4 | .2 | .0 | 6.6 |
| 2022–23 | NLEX | 25 | 25.5 | .463 | .367 | — | .889 | 4.0 | .6 | .5 | .1 | 7.2 |
| 2023–24 | NLEX | 23 | 25.9 | .431 | .381 | — | .815 | 3.3 | .7 | .7 | .1 | 8.0 |
| 2024–25 | NLEX | 34 | 26.3 | .380 | .329 | .000 | .828 | 3.8 | .9 | .5 | .1 | 6.7 |
| Career | | 273 | 21.8 | .402 | .350 | .000 | .773 | 2.9 | .6 | .4 | .1 | 6.3 |

== Personal life ==
Semerad is married to Sam Pinto. They became a couple in 2018, got engaged in November 2019 in Australia and married in a civil ceremony on March 8, 2021. On May 5, 2021, his wife announced on Instagram that they were expecting their first child. Days later, they said the baby was a girl.

== Showbiz career ==
The Semerad twins are currently managed by Arnold Vegafria's ALV Talent Circuit. They have since dabbled into hosting, the most recent was with Lucy Torres in TV5's weekly dance show Celebrity Dance Battle in 2014.

Aside from being basketball players, the twins also moonlight as models, endorsing signature brands such as Bench and Sperry.

In 2011, they both entered as houseguests in ABS-CBN reality show Pinoy Big Brother: Unlimited as part of the PBB's Double Trouble twist, disguising as fake Czech Big Brother Housemates, Antonik and Imerich Novak.

== Filmography ==
=== Television ===
| Year | Title | Role | Network |
|---|---|---|---|
| 2011 | Pinoy Big Brother: Unlimited | Houseguest | ABS-CBN |
| 2014 | Celebrity Dance Battle | Co-host | TV5 |
