= PBA Leo Awards =

Annual Philippine Basketball Association awards

- Awarded for: awarded to players during the league's annual awards
- Presented by: PBA
- First award: 2003
- Website: PBA.ph

The PBA Leo Awards, formerly known as the PBA MVP Awards Night (1975–1988) and PBA Annual Awards (1989–2002) is an annual awards ceremony of the Philippine Basketball Association to honor the achievements of its players for the season. The winners are awarded with The Leo, named in honor of the league's first commissioner, Leo Prieto.

Since the 2017–18 season, the Leo awards is held before the opening ceremonies of the new season. Before the 2017-18 season, the ceremony is usually held before the start of Game 4 of the best-of-seven finals series of the third conference of the season. If the finals series is a best-of-five affair, it is held before Game 3 of the series.

== The Leo ==
Jimmy Alapag holds The Leo representing his Most Valuable Player award during the 2003 PBA Annual Awards

The Leo is a statuette given by the Philippine Basketball Association to its seasonal awardees.

Introduced in 2003, it became the standard trophy of all awards given by the league for its season awards such as the Most Valuable Player, Mythical Team and others.

The statuette features a three-dimensional representation of the player depicted in the league's official logo. It was named in honor of Leopoldo "Leo" Prieto, the PBA's first commissioner.

== Venues ==
Season	Date	Venue	Ref.
1975			
1976			
1977			
1978			
1979			
1980			
1981			
1982		Araneta Coliseum	
1983		Araneta Coliseum	
1984		Araneta Coliseum	
1985		The ULTRA	
1986		The ULTRA	
1987		The ULTRA	
1988		The ULTRA	
1989		The ULTRA	
1990		The ULTRA	
1991		The ULTRA	
1992		PSC-NASA	
1993		Cuneta Astrodome	
1994		Cuneta Astrodome	
1995		Cuneta Astrodome	
1996	December 13, 1997	Cuneta Astrodome	
1997	December 9, 1997	Cuneta Astrodome	
1998	November 29, 1998	Araneta Coliseum	
1999	December 5, 1999	PhilSports Arena	
2000	December 17, 2000	Araneta Coliseum	
2001	December 12, 2001	Araneta Coliseum	
2002	December 22, 2002	Araneta Coliseum	
2003	December 15, 2003	Music Museum, Greenhills, San Juan	
2004–05	July 8, 2005	Araneta Coliseum	
2005–06	July 12, 2006	Araneta Coliseum	
2006–07	July 13, 2007	Araneta Coliseum	
2007–08	August 13, 2008	Araneta Coliseum	
2008–09	July 8, 2009	Araneta Coliseum	
2009–10	August 11, 2010	Araneta Coliseum	
2010–11	August 14, 2011	Araneta Coliseum	
2011–12	July 29, 2012	Smart Araneta Coliseum	
2012–13	October 18, 2013	Smart Araneta Coliseum	
2013–14	July 15, 2014	Smart Araneta Coliseum	
2014–15	July 17, 2015	Smart Araneta Coliseum	
2015–16	October 15, 2016	Smart Araneta Coliseum	
2016–17	October 20, 2017	Smart Araneta Coliseum	
2017–18	January 13, 2019	Philippine Arena	
2019	March 8, 2020	Smart Araneta Coliseum	
2020 (Season 45) (Note: Named as the PBA Special Awards night.)	January 19, 2021	TV5 Media Center	
2021 (Season 46)	June 5, 2022	Smart Araneta Coliseum	
2022–23 (Season 47)	November 5, 2023	Smart Araneta Coliseum	
2023–24 (Season 48)	August 18, 2024	Smart Araneta Coliseum	
2024–25 (Season 49)	October 5, 2025	Novotel Manila Araneta City	

== See also ==
- Philippine Basketball Association awards
