= 2014–15 GlobalPort Batang Pier season =

- Head coach: Eric Gonzales (interim)
- General manager: Bonnie Tan
- Owners: Sultan 900 Capital, Inc.

Philippine Cup results
- Record: 5–6 (45.5%)
- Place: 8th
- Playoff finish: Quarterfinalist (lost to Barangay Ginebra in one game with twice-to-win disadvantage)

Commissioner's Cup results
- Record: 4–7 (36.4%)
- Place: 10th
- Playoff finish: Did not qualify

Governors' Cup results
- Record: 7–4 (63.6%)
- Place: 4th
- Playoff finish: Quarterfinalist (lost to Star in two games with twice-to-beat advantage)

GlobalPort Batang Pier seasons

The 2014–15 GlobalPort Batang Pier season was the 3rd season of the franchise in the Philippine Basketball Association (PBA).

== Key dates ==
- August 24: The 2014 PBA Draft took place in Midtown Atrium, Robinson Place Manila.
- November 27: Eric Gonzales was appointed as the team's interim head coach, while former head coach Pido Jarencio was reassigned as the team's consultant.

== Draft picks ==
Round	Pick	Player	Position	Nationality	PBA D-League team	College
1	1	Stanley Pringle	G	United States	none	Penn State
1	7	Anthony Semerad	F/C	Australia	Maynilad Water Dragons	SBC
2	5	Prince Caperal	C	Philippines	Boracay Rum Waves	AU
2	7	John Pinto	G	Philippines	Cagayan Valley Rising Suns	AU

== Roster ==
2014–15 GlobalPort Batang Pier roster
Players
Coaches

Pos.	#	POB	Name	Height	Weight	DOB (YYYY–MM–DD)	From
F/C	2	(Philippines)	Billy Mamaril (C)	6 ft 6 in (1.98 m)	225 lb (102 kg)	1980-06-25	Bakersfield
G	3	(United States)	Stanley Pringle (R)	6 ft 1 in (1.85 m)	185 lb (84 kg)	1987-03-05	Penn State
F	5	(Philippines)	Marvin Hayes	6 ft 3 in (1.91 m)	190 lb (86 kg)	1986-05-13	José Rizal
F	6	(Australia)	Anthony Semerad (R)	6 ft 6 in (1.98 m)	230 lb (104 kg)	1991-04-25	San Beda
G	7	(Philippines)	Terrence Romeo	5 ft 11 in (1.80 m)	178 lb (81 kg)	1992-03-16	Far Eastern
G	8	(Philippines)	Ronjay Buenafe	6 ft 1 in (1.85 m)	190 lb (86 kg)	1983-05-27	Emilio Aguinaldo
G/F	9	(Philippines)	Paolo Taha (R)	6 ft 0 in (1.83 m)	180 lb (82 kg)	1990-12-05	St. Benilde
F	12	(Philippines)	Mark Isip	6 ft 5 in (1.96 m)	215 lb (98 kg)	1980-12-10	Far Eastern
G	14	(Philippines)	Denok Miranda	5 ft 11 in (1.80 m)	195 lb (88 kg)	1982-07-14	Far Eastern
F/C	15	(Philippines)	Jewel Ponferada	6 ft 6 in (1.98 m)	215 lb (98 kg)	1988-07-08	National-U
F/C	18	(Philippines)	Doug Kramer	6 ft 6 in (1.98 m)	235 lb (107 kg)	1983-07-10	Ateneo
C	19	(Philippines)	Prince Caperal (R)	6 ft 7 in (2.01 m)	230 lb (104 kg)	1993-06-12	Arellano
G	22	(Philippines)	John Pinto (R)	6 ft 0 in (1.83 m)	170 lb (77 kg)	1990-10-15	Arellano
F	32	(United States)	Keith Jensen	6 ft 5 in (1.96 m)	190 lb (86 kg)	1988-01-07	NYU

Head coach

- (Philippines) Alfredo Jarencio (UST)

Assistant coach(es)

- (Philippines) Eric Gonzales (UST)
- (Philippines) Senen Dueñas (UST)
- (Philippines) Ronald Cuan (De La Salle)
- (Philippines) Alvin Grey (UST)
- (Philippines) Johnedel Cardel (De La Salle)
- (Philippines) Oliver Bunye (De La Salle)

Team manager

- (Philippines) Bonnie Tan (Lyceum)

Legend

- (C) Team captain
- (CI) Commissioner's Cup Import
- (GI) Governors' Cup Import
- (EI) EASL Import
- (DP) Unsigned draft pick
- (FA) Free agent
- (IN) Inactive
- (S) Suspended
- (R) Rookie
- Injured

== Philippine Cup ==
=== Eliminations ===
==== Standings ====
Pos	Team	W	L	PCT	GB	Qualification
1	San Miguel Beermen	9	2	.818 (Note: Head-to-head record: San Miguel 1–0 Rain or Shine)	—	Advance to semifinals
2	Rain or Shine Elasto Painters	9	2	.818	—	Advance to semifinals
3	Alaska Aces	8	3	.727 (Note: Head-to-head record: Alaska 1–0 Talk 'N Text)	1	Twice-to-beat in the quarterfinals
4	Talk 'N Text Tropang Texters	8	3	.727	1	Twice-to-beat in the quarterfinals
5	Barangay Ginebra San Miguel	6	5	.545 (Note: Head-to-head quotient: Barangay Ginebra 1.07, Meralco 1.06, Purefoods Star 0.89)	3	Twice-to-beat in the quarterfinals
6	Meralco Bolts	6	5	.545	3	Twice-to-beat in the quarterfinals
7	Purefoods Star Hotshots	6	5	.545	3	Twice-to-win in the quarterfinals
8	GlobalPort Batang Pier	5	6	.455	4	Twice-to-win in the quarterfinals
9	Barako Bull Energy	4	7	.364 (Note: Head-to-head record: Barako Bull 1–0 NLEX)	5	Twice-to-win in the quarterfinals
10	NLEX Road Warriors	4	7	.364	5	Twice-to-win in the quarterfinals
11	Kia Sorento	1	10	.091	8	
12	Blackwater Elite	0	11	.000	9	

Source: PBA.ph

=== Playoffs ===
==== Bracket ====
Quarterfinals (1st phase) (Higher seeds twice-to-beat)
3	Alaska	82
10	NLEX	78
6	Meralco	77
7	Purefoods Star	65
4	Talk 'N Text	105
9	Barako Bull	76
5	Barangay Ginebra	95
8	GlobalPort	78

Quarterfinals (2nd phase) (Single elimination)
3	Alaska	87
6	Meralco	69
4	Talk N Text	83
5	Barangay Ginebra	67

Semifinals (Best-of-7)
2	Rain or Shine	2
3	Alaska	4
1	San Miguel	4
4	Talk N' Text	0

Finals (Best-of-7)
3	Alaska	3
1	San Miguel	4

== Commissioner's Cup ==
=== Eliminations ===
==== Standings ====
Pos	Team	W	L	PCT	GB	Qualification
1	Rain or Shine Elasto Painters	8	3	.727 (Note: Head-to-head quotient: Rain or Shine 1.025, Talk 'N Text 1.010, Purefoods 0.969)	—	Twice-to-beat in the quarterfinals
2	Talk 'N Text Tropang Texters	8	3	.727	—	Twice-to-beat in the quarterfinals
3	Purefoods Star Hotshots	8	3	.727	—	Best-of-three quarterfinals
4	NLEX Road Warriors	6	5	.545 (Note: Head-to-head record: NLEX 1–0 Meralco)	2	Best-of-three quarterfinals
5	Meralco Bolts	6	5	.545	2	Best-of-three quarterfinals
6	Alaska Aces	5	6	.455 (Note: Head-to-head quotient: Alaska 1.021, Barako Bull 1.019, Barangay Ginebra 0.960)	3	Best-of-three quarterfinals
7	Barako Bull Energy	5	6	.455	3	Twice-to-win in the quarterfinals
8	Barangay Ginebra San Miguel	5	6	.455	3	Twice-to-win in the quarterfinals
9	San Miguel Beermen	4	7	.364 (Note: Head-to-head quotient: San Miguel 1.011, GlobalPort 0.995, Kia 0.994)	4	
10	GlobalPort Batang Pier	4	7	.364	4	
11	Kia Carnival	4	7	.364	4	
12	Blackwater Elite	3	8	.273	5	

Source: PBA.ph

=== Playoffs ===
==== Bracket ====
Quarterfinals
(#1 twice-to-beat)
1	Rain or Shine	92
8	Barangay Ginebra	91
(Best-of-3)
4	NLEX	0
5	Meralco	2
(#2 twice-to-beat)
2	Talk 'N Text	127
7	Barako Bull	97
(Best-of-3)
3	Purefoods Star	2
6	Alaska	0

Semifinals (Best-of-5)
1	Rain or Shine	3
5	Meralco	0
2	Talk 'N Text	3
3	Purefoods Star	1

Finals (Best-of-7)
1	Rain or Shine	3
2	Talk 'N Text	4

== Transactions ==
=== Trades ===
Pre-draft

August 11, 2014	To Alaska Eric Menk	To GlobalPort 2014 2nd round picks (Prince Caperal, 17th overall; John Pinto, 19th overall)

Draft day

August 24, 2014	To GlobalPort 1st round pick Anthony Semerad; 2016 1st round pick (from San Mig)	To San Mig Coffee 2016 1st round pick and 2018 2nd round pick (from GlobalPort)

Preseason

September 22, 2014	To GlobalPort Nonoy Baclao and 2017 1st round pick (from Talk 'n Text)	To NLEX Harold Arboleda (from Talk 'n Text via Globalport); 2016 2nd round pick (from Ginebra via GlobalPort); 2018 2nd round pick (from Talk 'n Text via Globalport)	To Talk 'N Text Jay Washington (from GlobalPort); Matt Ganuelas (from NLEX via GlobalPort)

Philippine Cup

December 10, 2014	To GlobalPort Sol Mercado; 2018 and 2019 2nd round picks	To San Miguel Alex Cabagnot
January 8, 2015	To Barako Bull Sol Mercado	To GlobalPort Denok Miranda; 2016 2nd round pick

Commissioner's Cup

March 14, 2015	To GlobalPort Gabby Espinas; Alaska's 2017 1st round pick	To Alaska Nonoy Baclao; Globalport's 2017 1st round pick
April 6, 2015
April 6, 2015	To GlobalPort Billy Mamaril (from Ginebra and Barako Bull); Doug Kramer	To San Miguel Yancy de Ocampo; Gabby Espinas

=== Recruited imports ===
Tournament	Name	Debuted	Last game	Record
Commissioner's Cup	C.J. Leslie	January 27 (vs Kia)	February 10 (vs Alaska)	2–2
Commissioner's Cup	Calvin Warner	February 15 (vs Meralco)	March 1 (vs Talk 'N Text)	2–2
Commissioner's Cup	Derrick Caracter	March 15 (vs NLEX)	March 24 (vs San Miguel)	0–3
Governors' Cup	Patrick O'Bryant	May 5 (vs Meralco)	May 8 (vs Blackwater)	2–0
Governors' Cup	Steven Thomas	May 12 (vs Star)	May 17 (vs San Miguel)	1–1
Governors' Cup	Jarrid Famous	May 22 (vs Rain or Shine)	June 28 (vs Star)	4–5
Governors' Cup	(Palestine) Omar Krayem*	May 5 (vs Meralco)	June 28 (vs Star)	7–6

(* Asian import)
