= 2015–16 GlobalPort Batang Pier season =

- Head coach: Johnedel Cardel
- Owners: Sultan 900 Capital, Inc.

Philippine Cup results
- Record: 7–4 (63.6%)
- Place: 5th
- Playoff finish: Semifinalist (lost to Alaska, 1–4)

Commissioner's Cup results
- Record: 3–8 (27.3%)
- Place: 12th
- Playoff finish: Did not qualify

Governors' Cup results
- Record: 4–7 (36.4%)
- Place: 10th
- Playoff finish: Did not qualify

GlobalPort Batang Pier seasons

The 2015–16 GlobalPort Batang Pier season was the 4th season of the franchise in the Philippine Basketball Association (PBA).

== Key dates ==
- August 23: The 2015 PBA draft took place in Midtown Atrium, Robinson Place Manila.

== Draft picks ==
Round	Pick	Player	Position	Nationality	PBA D-League team	College
3	26	Roi Sumang	PG	Philippines	Tanduay Light Rhum Masters	UE
4	37	Ryan Wetherell	SG	United States Philippines	None	USC
5	46	Bong Galanza	SG	Philippines	Café France Bakers	UE

== Roster ==
2015–16 GlobalPort Batang Pier roster
Players
Coaches

Pos.	#	POB	Name	Height	Weight	DOB (YYYY–MM–DD)	From
C	00	(Kuwait)	Yousef Taha	6 ft 7 in (2.01 m)	231 lb (105 kg)	1988–07–08	Mapúa
F	1	(Philippines)	Rico Maierhofer (injured)	6 ft 6 in (1.98 m)	175 lb (79 kg)	1985–11–04	De La Salle
F/C	2	(Philippines)	Billy Mamaril (C)	6 ft 6 in (1.98 m)	225 lb (102 kg)	1980–06–25	Bakersfield
G	3	(United States)	Stanley Pringle	6 ft 1 in (1.85 m)	190 lb (86 kg)	1987–03–05	Penn State
F	6	(Australia)	Anthony Semerad	6 ft 4 in (1.93 m)	220 lb (100 kg)	1991–04–25	San Beda
G	7	(Philippines)	Terrence Romeo	5 ft 11 in (1.80 m)	178 lb (81 kg)	1992–03–16	Far Eastern
G	8	(United States)	Karl Dehesa	6 ft 2 in (1.88 m)	185 lb (84 kg)	1987–05–24	Waldorf
G	9	(Philippines)	Joseph Yeo	6 ft 1 in (1.85 m)	190 lb (86 kg)	1983–09–07	De La Salle
G	11	(Philippines)	Jeric Fortuna	5 ft 8 in (1.73 m)	170 lb (77 kg)	1991–11–25	UST
F	12	(Philippines)	Mark Isip	6 ft 4 in (1.93 m)	215 lb (98 kg)	1980–12–10	Far Eastern
F/C	13	(Philippines)	Philip Paredes	6 ft 5 in (1.96 m)	200 lb (91 kg)	1992–01–12	De La Salle
F/C	18	(Philippines)	Doug Kramer	6 ft 5 in (1.96 m)	235 lb (107 kg)	1983–07–10	Ateneo
F	23	(Philippines)	Jay Washington	6 ft 7 in (2.01 m)	210 lb (95 kg)	1981–10–11	Eckerd
F	77	(Philippines)	Gab Banal	6 ft 3 in (1.91 m)	200 lb (91 kg)	1990–09–09	Mapúa
F	80	(Philippines)	Sunday Salvacion	6 ft 3 in (1.91 m)	190 lb (86 kg)	1978–12–17	St. Benilde
G	–	(United States)	Mike Cortez (injured)	6 ft 0 in (1.83 m)	170 lb (77 kg)	1980–10–11	De La Salle

Head coach

- (Philippines) Johnedel Cardel

Assistant coach(es)

- (Philippines) Eric Gonzales (1st Assistant)
- (Philippines) Cholo Villanueva
- (Philippines) Senen Dueñas
- (Philippines) Oliver Bunyi
- (Philippines) Erwin Sta. Maria
- (Philippines) Pido Jarencio (Ops Head)
- (Philippines) Franz Pumaren (consultant)

Team manager

- (Philippines) Bonnie Tan
- (Philippines) Benjo Flores (assistant)

Legend

- (C) Team captain
- (CI) Commissioner's Cup Import
- (GI) Governors' Cup Import
- (EI) EASL Import
- (DP) Unsigned draft pick
- (FA) Free agent
- (IN) Inactive
- (S) Suspended
- (R) Rookie
- Injured

Roster

== Philippine Cup ==
=== Eliminations ===
==== Standings ====
Pos	Team	W	L	PCT	GB	Qualification
1	Alaska Aces	9	2	.818 (Note: Head-to-head record: Alaska 1–0 San Miguel)	—	Advance to semifinals
2	San Miguel Beermen	9	2	.818	—	Advance to semifinals
3	Rain or Shine Elasto Painters	8	3	.727	1	Twice-to-beat in the quarterfinals
4	Barangay Ginebra San Miguel	7	4	.636 (Note: Head-to-head record: Barangay Ginebra 1–0 GlobalPort)	2	Twice-to-beat in the quarterfinals
5	GlobalPort Batang Pier	7	4	.636	2	Twice-to-beat in the quarterfinals
6	TNT Tropang Texters	6	5	.545	3	Twice-to-beat in the quarterfinals
7	NLEX Road Warriors	5	6	.455 (Note: Head-to-head record: NLEX 1–0 Barako Bull)	4	Twice-to-win in the quarterfinals
8	Barako Bull Energy	5	6	.455	4	Twice-to-win in the quarterfinals
9	Star Hotshots	4	7	.364	5	Twice-to-win in the quarterfinals
10	Blackwater Elite	3	8	.273	6	Twice-to-win in the quarterfinals
11	Mahindra Enforcer	2	9	.182	7	
12	Meralco Bolts	1	10	.091	8	

Source: PBA.ph

=== Playoffs ===
==== Bracket ====
Quarterfinals (1st phase) (Higher seeds twice-to-beat)
3	Rain or Shine	95
10	Blackwater	90
6	TNT	90
7	NLEX	88
4	Barangay Ginebra	92*
9	Star	89
5	GlobalPort	94
8	Barako Bull	85

Quarterfinals (2nd phase) (Single elimination)
3	Rain or Shine	104
6	TNT	89
4	Barangay Ginebra	83
5	GlobalPort	84*

Semifinals (Best-of-7)
2	San Miguel	4
3	Rain or Shine	2
1	Alaska	4
5	GlobalPort	1

Finals (Best-of-7)
2	San Miguel	4
1	Alaska	3

*Game went into overtime

== Commissioner's Cup ==
=== Eliminations ===
==== Standings ====
Pos	Team	W	L	PCT	GB	Qualification
1	San Miguel Beermen	8	3	.727 (Note: Head-to-head record: San Miguel 1–0 Meralco)	—	Twice-to-beat in the quarterfinals
2	Meralco Bolts	8	3	.727	—	Twice-to-beat in the quarterfinals
3	Alaska Aces	7	4	.636 (Note: Head-to-head quotient: Alaska 1.18, Barangay Ginebra 1.03, Rain or Shine 0.84)	1	Best-of-three quarterfinals
4	Barangay Ginebra San Miguel	7	4	.636	1	Best-of-three quarterfinals
5	Rain or Shine Elasto Painters	7	4	.636	1	Best-of-three quarterfinals
6	Tropang TNT	6	5	.545	2	Best-of-three quarterfinals
7	NLEX Road Warriors	5	6	.455 (Note: Head-to-head record: NLEX 1–0 Star)	3	Twice-to-win in the quarterfinals
8	Star Hotshots	5	6	.455	3	Twice-to-win in the quarterfinals
9	Mahindra Enforcer	4	7	.364	4	
10	Blackwater Elite	3	8	.273 (Note: Head-to-head quotient: Blackwater 1.04, Phoenix 0.99, GlobalPort 0.98)	5	
11	Phoenix Fuel Masters	3	8	.273	5	
12	GlobalPort Batang Pier	3	8	.273	5	

Source: PBA.ph

== Governors' Cup ==
=== Eliminations ===
==== Standings ====
Pos	Team	W	L	PCT	GB	Qualification
1	TNT KaTropa	10	1	.909	—	Twice-to-beat in the quarterfinals
2	San Miguel Beermen	8	3	.727 (Note: Head-to-head record: San Miguel 1–0 Barangay Ginebra)	2	Twice-to-beat in the quarterfinals
3	Barangay Ginebra San Miguel	8	3	.727	2	Twice-to-beat in the quarterfinals
4	Meralco Bolts	6	5	.545 (Note: Head-to-head quotient: Meralco 1.039, Mahindra 1.017, Alaska 0.950; fourth seed playoff: Meralco 104–99 Mahindra)	4	Twice-to-beat in the quarterfinals
5	Mahindra Enforcer	6	5	.545	4	Twice-to-win in the quarterfinals
6	Alaska Aces	6	5	.545	4	Twice-to-win in the quarterfinals
7	NLEX Road Warriors	5	6	.455 (Note: Head-to-head quotient: NLEX 1.04, Rain or Shine 1.03, Phoenix 0.93; eighth seed playoff: Phoenix 105–94 Rain or Shine)	5	Twice-to-win in the quarterfinals
8	Phoenix Fuel Masters	5	6	.455	5	Twice-to-win in the quarterfinals
9	Rain or Shine Elasto Painters	5	6	.455	5	
10	GlobalPort Batang Pier	4	7	.364	6	
11	Star Hotshots	2	9	.182	8	
12	Blackwater Elite	1	10	.091	9	

Source: PBA.ph

== Transactions ==
=== Trades ===
Off-season

August 18, 2015	To GlobalPort Jervy Cruz	To Rain or Shine Jewel Ponferada
August 24, 2015	To GlobalPort Jay Washington	To Talk 'N Text Dennis Miranda
September 28, 2015	To Barako Bull Mac Baracael; Prince Caperal	To Barangay Ginebra Joe Devance (via Barako Bull)
September 28, 2015	To GlobalPort Dorian Peña	To Star Jake Pascual; Ronald Pascual
October 13, 2015
October 13, 2015	To Barako Bull Jervy Cruz	To GlobalPort Rico Maierhofer

=== Recruited imports ===
Tournament	Name	Debuted	Last game	Record
Commissioner's Cup	Brian Williams	February 12 (vs. Mahindra)	February 14 (vs. Ginebra)	1–1
Commissioner's Cup	Calvin Warner	February 19 (vs. TNT)	March 6 (vs. Blackwater)	1–3
Commissioner's Cup	Shawn Taggart	March 12 (vs. Alaska)	April 8 (vs. Phoenix)	1–4
Governors' Cup	(United States) Dominique Sutton	July 16 (vs. Ginebra)	July 20 (vs. Mahindra)	0–2
Governors' Cup	(United States) Mike Glover	July 24 (vs. Star)	September 14 (vs. Blackwater)	4–5
