= Stanley Pringle =

Filipino-American basketball player (born 1987)

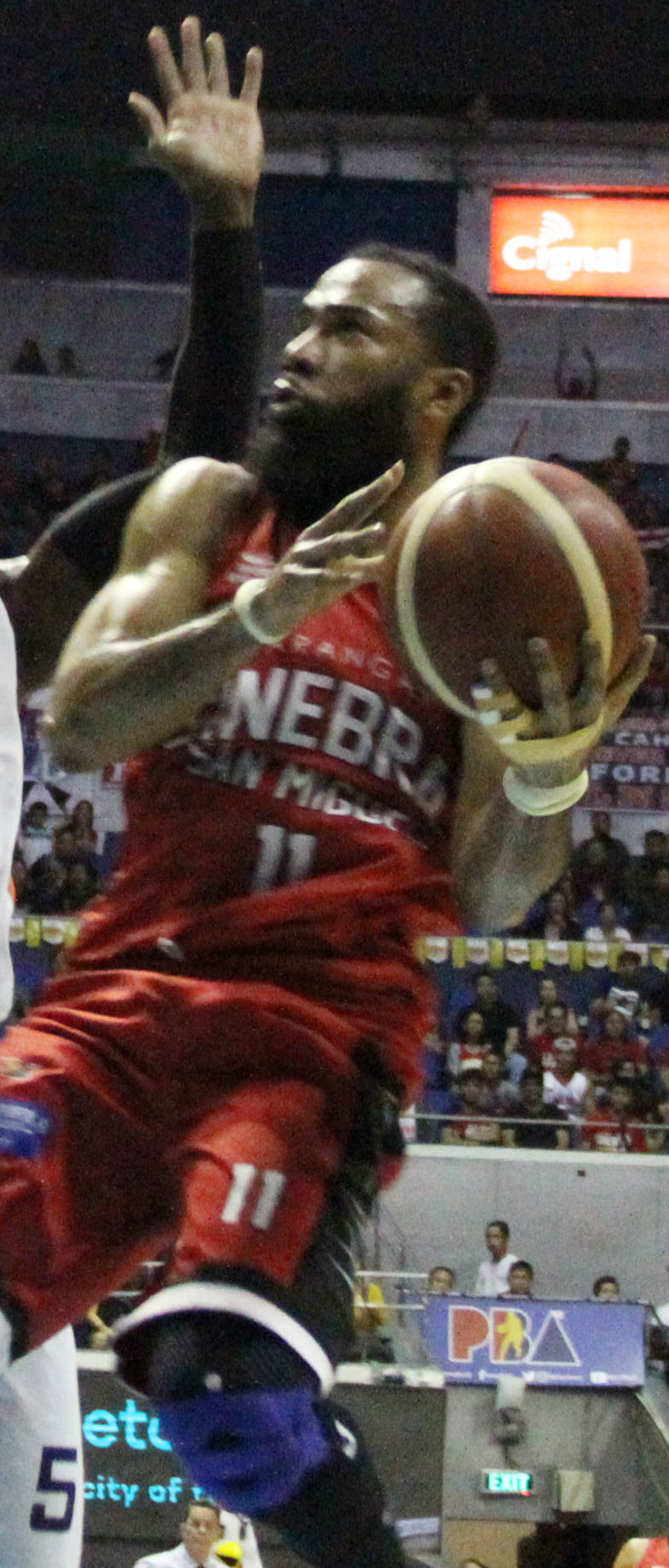
- Pringle with the Barangay Ginebra San Miguel in 2020

No. 11 – Rain or Shine Elasto Painters
- Position: Shooting guard / point guard
- League: PBA

Personal information
- Born: March 5, 1987 (age 39) San Diego, California, U.S.
- Listed height: 6 ft 1 in (1.85 m)
- Listed weight: 185 lb (84 kg)

Career information
- High school: Landstown (Virginia Beach, Virginia)
- College: Pasco–Hernando State (2005–2007); Penn State (2007–2009)
- PBA draft: 2014: 1st round, 1st overall
- Drafted by: GlobalPort Batang Pier
- Playing career: 2009–present

Career history
- 2009–2010: Leuven Bears
- 2010–2011: Siarka Tarnobrzeg
- 2011–2012: Dnipro-Azot
- 2012–2013: Indonesia Warriors
- 2014–2019: GlobalPort / NorthPort Batang Pier
- 2019–2024: Barangay Ginebra San Miguel
- 2024–2025: Terrafirma Dyip
- 2025–present: Rain or Shine Elasto Painters

Career highlights
- 4× PBA champion (2019 Governors', 2020 Philippine, 2021 Governors', 2022–23 Commissioner's); PBA Best Player of the Conference (2020 Philippine); 7× PBA All-Star (2015–2019, 2023, 2024); 2× PBA Mythical First Team (2018, 2020); 2× PBA Mythical Second Team (2015, 2019); PBA Rookie of the Year (2015); PBA All-Rookie Team (2015); PBA scoring champion (2018); ABL champion (2012)

Stanley Wayne Andres Pringle Jr. (born March 5, 1987) is a Filipino-American professional basketball player for the Rain or Shine Elasto Painters of the Philippine Basketball Association (PBA). Pringle played college basketball for Pasco–Hernando State College for 2 years and for Penn State in his last two years in college. He was the first overall pick of the 2014 PBA draft.

== Early life ==
Pringle is the son of a former US Navy veteran and a Filipina mother. Being in the US Navy, the Pringle family spent time in Korea and Japan. Pringle started playing basketball in a Japanese youth Navy league at the age of six. Because his basketball talent and skills were beyond those of his age group abroad, Stanley competed against older kids. After moving back to Virginia with his family, he was picked up by the Virginia Beach Heat, a local Amateur Athletic Union team coached by Steve Strausbaugh and Norman Hassell.

Pringle was the starting point-guard of Landstown High School in Virginia Beach for four years. As a senior, he averaged 18.3 points and 6.1 assists per game to lead his team to a 22–3 record and the Virginia Class AAA state tournament final. For these exploits, he was named first-team all-state by the coaches, second team by the Associated Press, and was named the Virginia Beach Player of the Year. Pringle scored 1,100 career points in his high school career and was the captain of the team for two years.

== College career ==
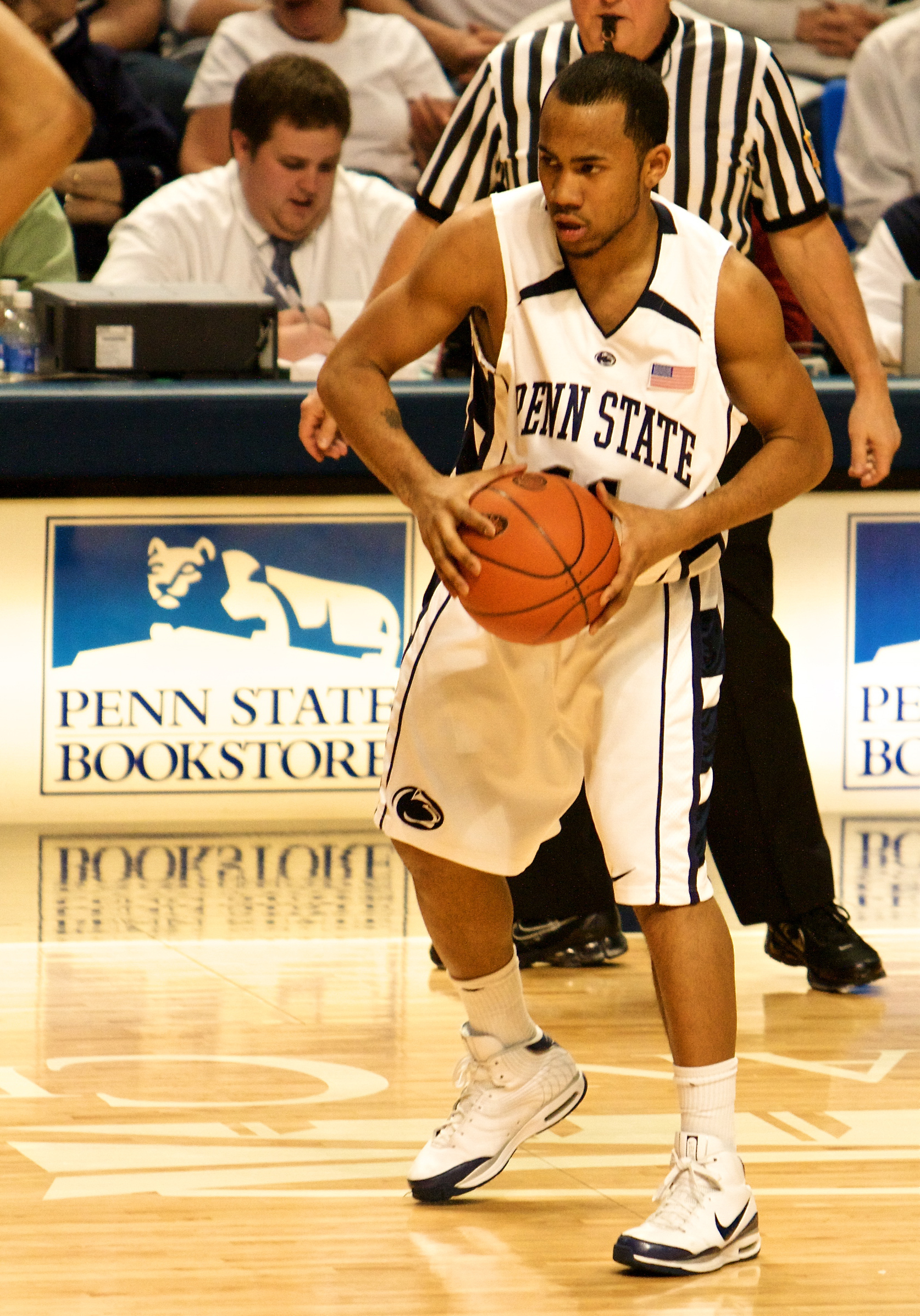
Pringle played for Penn State from 2007 to 2009.

Pringle spent his first two years of college basketball at Pasco-Hernando State College, being the team captain under coach Bobby Bowman. As a freshman, he led the Conquistadors to a third-place finish on a 15–15 record in the Suncoast Conference. This with per-game averages of 16.5 points and 3.8 assists earned him 2006 Suncoast Conference Freshman-of-the-Year and first-team all-conference honors. As a sophomore, he was 2007 Suncoast Conference Player-of-the-Year, first-team Florida Community College Athletic Association All-State selection, and earned an honorable-mention National Junior College Athletic Association All-American for leading his team to a 19–12 record on 18.9 points, 5.5 assists, 5.0 rebounds, and 1.2 steals per game.

He then transferred to play two years at Penn State. For the 2007–2008 season, Pringle played in all 31 games, starting 12 of them. He averaged 6.9 points and 2.3 assists per game, shot a team-best 40.9 percent from three-point range, and had seven double-digit scoring games. In 2008–09, Pringle helped his team win the National Invitation Tournament while averaging 12.75 points, 3.1 rebounds and 2.8 assists while shooting 45.3% from the field and ranking 6th in the Big Ten in three point shooting percentage with 45%. Described as one of the quickest and fastest players in the conference, Pringle had his team's highest vertical leaping ability at 37 inches and won a pre-season Nittany Lion slam-dunk contest.

In 2008, Pringle was charged by the Penn State Police for an incident involving public masturbation. He graduated in 2009 with a degree in Labor Studies and Employment Relations with a concentration in human resources.

== International career ==
In 2009, Pringle tried out in a camp for Filipino-American prospects of the Smart Gilas-Philippine national basketball team in Las Vegas. Shortly after, he signed up with the Leuven Bears in Belgium. He spent the next season with Siarka Tarnobrzeg in Poland, where he averaged 12.3 points, 3.3 rebounds, 2.5 assists and 2.4 steals per game. Pringle then played for Dnipro Azot in Ukraine, averaging 15.0 points, 4.6 assists, 3.5 rebounds and 1.3 steals per game.

In 2012, he played for the Indonesia Warriors, leading them to the championship with 18.6 points, 4.8 rebounds and 6.2 assists per game.

== PBA career ==
=== GlobalPort/NorthPort Batang Pier ===
In 2014, Pringle decided to apply for the 2014 PBA draft. He was predicted by many sports analysts to be that year's first overall selection. On August 24, he was picked by GlobalPort Batang Pier who held the first pick. At age 27, he was also the oldest player to be picked first overall in the PBA draft until 28 year old Christian Standhardinger was drafted by the San Miguel Beermen three years later. Pringle won the 2015 Rookie of the Year award in the PBA and was also included in the Mythical Second Team.

On September 1, 2017, he had a then career-high 30 points in a win against the TNT Katropa.

On June 22, 2018, he scored a career-high 50 points including 9 three-pointers in a 133–115 win against Columbian Dyip. That year, he made it to the finals of the 3-point shootout during the 2018 All-Star Week, losing to James Yap. He also led the league in points and turnovers that season.

=== Barangay Ginebra San Miguel ===
In June 2019, Pringle was traded to Brgy. Ginebra. He was a vital part of the team where they won the 2019 PBA Governors' Cup championship. He averaged 18.4 points a game in the Finals series.

In the 2020 Season, he led Ginebra to their first Philippine Cup title since 2007, was named Best Player of the Conference, and led that season's Mythical Five.

In the 2021 Season, he was ruled out for the rest of the conference after undergoing surgery for his meniscus injury.

=== Terrafirma Dyip ===
On July 13, 2024, Pringle, along with Christian Standhardinger and a 2023 first-round pick, was traded to the Terrafirma Dyip for Isaac Go, Stephen Holt, and a 2023 first-round pick.

=== Rain or Shine Elasto Painters ===
On July 15, 2025, Pringle signed with the Rain or Shine Elasto Painters on a 2-year deal, as an unrestricted free agent.

== PBA career statistics ==
Legend
GP	Games played	MPG	Minutes per game	FG%	Field-goal percentage
3FG%	3-point field-goal percentage	4P%	4-point field-goal percentage	FT%	Free-throw percentage
RPG	Rebounds per game	APG	Assists per game	SPG	Steals per game
BPG	Blocks per game	PPG	Points per game	127	Career high

As of the end of 2025–26 season

Led the league

=== Season-by-season averages ===
Year	Team	GP	MPG	FG%	3P%	4P%	FT%	RPG	APG	SPG	BPG	PPG
2014–15	GlobalPort	31	28.9	.466	.358	—	.758	5.9	3.9	1.5	.1	14.0
2015–16	GlobalPort	34	38.9	.483	.398	—	.772	5.8	4.5	.8	.4	19.3
2016–17	GlobalPort	35	37.3	.489	.385	—	.844	6.1	3.7	.8	.3	18.9
2017–18	GlobalPort / NorthPort	33	39.0	.439	.346	—	.750	6.7	5.5	1.5	.2	21.0
2019	NorthPort	45	37.9	.456	.373	—	.765	4.7	4.3	1.5	.2	17.0
2019	Barangay Ginebra	45	37.9	.456	.373	—	.765	4.7	4.3	1.5	.2	17.0
2020	Barangay Ginebra	22	36.1	.443	.383	—	.891	5.9	3.7	1.0	—	18.5
2021	Barangay Ginebra	14	37.7	.434	.343	—	.821	5.6	3.2	1.1	.1	16.5
2022–23	Barangay Ginebra	58	21.7	.452	.422	—	.759	2.8	2.0	.6	.0	8.2
2023–24	Barangay Ginebra	34	22.4	.429	.373	—	.480	2.4	1.7	1.0	.1	8.4
2024–25	Terrafirma	32	31.3	.431	.367	.294	.818	4.3	3.5	.9	—	13.0
2025–26	Rain or Shine	8	16.0	.297	.348	.333	1.000	1.0	1.4	.3	—	4.3
Career		346	31.8	.454	.377	.297	.780	4.7	3.5	1.0	.1	14.6

== International career statistics ==
Year	Team	League	GP	MPG	FG%	3P%	FT%	RPG	APG	SPG	BPG	PPG
2010–11	Siarka	PLK	20	31.0	.427	.329	.679	3.3	2.5	2.4	.0	12.3
2011–12	Dnipro-Azot	UBSL	36	31.1	.458	.399	.823	3.5	4.6	1.3	.1	15.0
2012–13	Indonesia Warriors	ABL	12	32.5	.423	.291	.684	5.5	3.2	1.4	.1	15.8
Career		International League	68	31.3	.436	.339	.728	3.8	3.8	1.6	.1	14.3

== National team career ==
Pringle debuted for the Philippine national basketball team on the 2018 Asian Games Men's Basketball which finished fifth place.

Pringle is not eligible to play for the Philippine national basketball team as a local player under FIBA guidelines since he failed to secure a Philippine passport before he turned 16 years old.

As a holder of a Philippine passport, Pringle is eligible to play for the country's 3x3 side as a local unlike in the full 5-a-side national team which has stricter requirements. In June 2018, Pringle debuted for the country's 3x3 basketball national team which played in the 2018 FIBA 3x3 World Cup in Bocaue.
