= 2019 PBA season =

44th PBA season

- Duration: January 13, 2019 – January 17, 2020
- Teams: 12
- TV partner(s): Local: ESPN 5; 5 PBA Rush (HD); International: AksyonTV International; Online: ESPN Player

2018 PBA draft
- Top draft pick: CJ Perez
- Picked by: Columbian Dyip
- Season MVP: June Mar Fajardo (San Miguel Beermen)
- Top scorer: CJ Perez (Columbian Dyip)
- Philippine Cup champions: San Miguel Beermen
- Philippine Cup runners-up: Magnolia Hotshots Pambansang Manok
- Commissioner's cup champions: San Miguel Beermen
- Commissioner's cup runners-up: TNT Katropa
- Governors' Cup champions: Barangay Ginebra San Miguel
- Governors' Cup runners-up: Meralco Bolts

Seasons
- ← 2017–18 2020 →

The 2019 PBA season was the 44th season of the Philippine Basketball Association. The league continued to use the three-conference format, starting with the Philippine Cup. The Commissioner's Cup and the Governors' Cup are the second and third conferences in the upcoming season.

Due to the major adjustments in the league calendar, the start of the league's 44th season was set to January 13, 2019. This was the first time since 2003 that the league opened their season in January or February. The PBA Leo Awards will be held during the opening ceremonies of the 2019 season while the 2018 PBA draft is set on December 16. The schedule is also affected by the Philippine national team's participation in the 2019 FIBA Basketball World Cup and the Southeast Asian Games.

The 2019 PBA All-Star Game was played from March 29 to 31, 2019 at Calasiao, Pangasinan.

== Executive board ==
- Commissioner: Willie Marcial
- Chairman: Ricky Vargas (Representing TNT KaTropa)
- Vice-Chairman: Richard Bachmann (Representing Alaska Aces)
- Treasurer: Raymond T. Zorrilla (Representing Phoenix Pulse Fuel Masters)

== Teams ==
Team	Company	Governor	Coach	Captain
Alaska Aces	Alaska Milk Corporation	Richard Bachmann	Alex Compton	JVee Casio
Barangay Ginebra San Miguel	Ginebra San Miguel, Inc.	Alfrancis Chua	Tim Cone	LA Tenorio
Blackwater Elite	Ever Bilena Cosmetics, Inc.	Silliman Sy	Bong Ramos	Mike Cortez
Columbian Dyip	Columbian Autocar Corporation	Bobby Rosales	Johnedel Cardel	Glenn Khobuntin
Magnolia Hotshots Pambansang Manok	San Miguel Pure Foods Company, Inc.	Rene Pardo	Chito Victolero	Rafi Reavis
Meralco Bolts	Manila Electric Company	Al Panlilio	Norman Black	Reynel Hugnatan
NLEX Road Warriors	Metro Pacific Investments Corporation	Rodrigo Franco	Yeng Guiao	Asi Taulava
NorthPort Batang Pier	Sultan 900 Capital, Inc.	Eric Arejola	Pido Jarencio	Sean Anthony
Phoenix Pulse Fuel Masters	Phoenix Petroleum Philippines, Inc.	Raymond Zorrilla	Louie Alas	LA Revilla
Rain or Shine Elasto Painters	Asian Coatings Philippines, Inc.	Mamerto Mondragon	Caloy Garcia	Gabe Norwood
San Miguel Beermen	San Miguel Brewery, Inc.	Robert Non	Leo Austria	Arwind Santos
TNT KaTropa	Smart Communications	Ricky Vargas	Bong Ravena	Jayson Castro

== Arenas ==
Like several Metro Manila-centric leagues, most games are held at arenas within Metro Manila, either the Smart Araneta Coliseum or the Mall of Asia Arena, and sometimes, in the Ynares Center in Antipolo. Games outside this area are called "out-of-town" games, and are usually played on Saturdays. Provincial arenas usually host one game, rarely two; these arenas typically host only once per season, but a league may return within a season if the turnout is satisfactory.

Typically, all playoff games are held in Metro Manila arenas, although playoff and Finals games have been seldom played in the provinces.

=== Main arenas ===
Quezon City	Pasay
Smart Araneta Coliseum	Mall of Asia Arena
Pasay	Antipolo, Rizal
Cuneta Astrodome	Ynares Center

=== Out-of-town arenas ===
Provincial venues of the PBA that hosted one game day (red), and two or more game days (blue).
Location of Dubai as compared to Antipolo.

Highlighted are playoff games.

Arena	City	Date	Match-up
Philippine Arena	Bocaue, Bulacan	January 13, 2019	Barangay Ginebra vs. TNT
Calasiao Sports Complex	Calasiao, Pangasinan	January 26, 2019	Barangay Ginebra vs. Rain or Shine
Davao del Sur Coliseum	Digos, Davao del Sur	February 9, 2019	Barangay Ginebra vs. Blackwater
Xavier University Gym	Cagayan de Oro	March 2, 2019	Meralco vs. Magnolia
Xavier University Gym	Cagayan de Oro	July 13, 2019	Rain or Shine vs. San Miguel
Panabo Multi-Purpose Tourism, Sports and Cultural Center	Panabo, Davao del Norte	March 16, 2019	San Miguel vs. Phoenix
AUF Sports Arena and Cultural Center	Angeles	March 23, 2019	NLEX vs. Barangay Ginebra
Batangas City Sports Center	Batangas City	June 23, 2019	Columbian vs. Rain or Shine; Barangay Ginebra vs. NLEX
Mayor Vitaliano D. Agan Coliseum	Zamboanga City	June 29, 2019	Magnolia vs. Meralco
Santa Rosa Sports Complex	Santa Rosa, Laguna	September 29, 2019	Blackwater vs. NLEX; Alaska vs. San Miguel
Hoops Dome	Lapu-Lapu City	November 9, 2019	San Miguel vs. Rain or Shine
University of Southeastern Philippines Gym	Davao City	November 16, 2019	TNT vs Magnolia
Quezon Convention Center	Lucena	January 10, 2020	Barangay Ginebra vs. Meralco

These games were played outside the Philippines:

Arena	City	Date	Match-up
Coca-Cola Arena	Dubai, United Arab Emirates	October 4, 2019	San Miguel vs. NLEX
Coca-Cola Arena	Dubai, United Arab Emirates	October 5, 2019	NLEX vs. Barangay Ginebra

== Transactions ==
=== Retirement ===
- January 4, 2019: Jett Manuel officially announced his retirement after playing one season in the league for the Barangay Ginebra San Miguel franchise.
- January 8, 2019: Chris Tiu officially announced his retirement after playing six seasons in the league for the Rain or Shine Elasto Painters franchise.
- April 4, 2019: Josh Urbiztondo officially announced his retirement after playing eight seasons in the league.
- April 12, 2019: Rico Maierhofer officially announced his retirement after playing eight seasons in the league.
- November 14, 2019: Doug Kramer officially announced his retirement after playing 12 seasons in the league.

=== Coaching changes ===
Team	Outgoing coach	Manner of departure	Date of vacancy	Replaced with	Date of appointment	Ref.
Blackwater Elite	Bong Ramos	Fired	Philippine Cup	Aries Dimaunahan (interim)	April 4, 2019	
Alaska Aces	Alex Compton	Resigned	Governors' Cup	Jeffrey Cariaso	August 22, 2019	
Blackwater Elite	Aries Dimaunahan (interim)	End of contract	Governors' Cup	Nash Racela	November 27, 2019	

=== Rule changes ===
The PBA competition committee approved the rule changes for implementation starting in the Philippine Cup games:

Rule changes (effective for the 2019 PBA Philippine Cup)
1. Goaltending violations will be subject for review for the duration of a match.
2. The FIBA rule for traveling violations (also known as the 0-step rule) will be adopted. (a player who catches the ball while he is progressing, or upon completion of a dribble, may take two steps in coming to a stop, passing, or shooting the ball.)
3. Coaches are now allowed to call timeouts verbally. The old rule requires coaches to make the "time-out" sign before the timeout request will be granted.

== Notable events ==
- The PBA Board of Governors decided to retain Ricky Vargas of TNT KaTropa as the Board Chairman. Subsequently, Dickie Bachmann of Alaska and Raymond Zorilla of Phoenix were retained as Vice-Chairman and Treasurer respectively.

=== Philippine Cup ===
- February 17: A legends game organized by the PBA Legends Foundation and Breakthrough and Milestones Productions International (UNTV) entitled PBA Legends: Return of the Rivals was held at the Smart Araneta Coliseum. Former players from the Alaska Milkmen and the San Miguel Beermen played in the first game, while former players from Purefoods Hotdogs and the Ginebra San Miguel played in the second game.
- March 1: The 2019 season schedule will be modified to accommodate the preparations of the Philippine men's basketball team for the FIBA Basketball World Cup to be held in September and the Southeast Asian Games on December. The season may be extended up to January 2020.
- April 9: PBA referee Guillermo "Emy" Tangkion died after collapsing during their referee's workout at the JSCGO Gymnasium. A moment of silence was observed the following day before the start of the quarterfinals match between the San Miguel Beermen and the TNT KaTropa.

=== Commissioner's Cup ===
- May 16: A rule change was made to be implemented starting the Commissioner's Cup that will allow a video review if a shot was made before or after the expiration of the 24-second shotclock throughout the game. Before the rule change, a video review is only possible if the shot was made in the last two minutes of the game. The rule change was made in light of the controversial shot made by Magnolia's Rome dela Rosa during Game 7 of their best-of-seven semifinals series against Rain or Shine, at the 3:30 mark of the 4th quarter. The referees counted his three-point basket even though replays showed that the ball was still in his hands when the shotclock expired.
- May 19: The PBA began using the Molten BG5000 basketball as their official tournament ball. The same ball will be used during the 2019 FIBA Basketball World Cup.
- June 4: Calvin Abueva of the Phoenix Pulse Fuel Masters was indefinitely suspended by PBA Commissioner Willie Marcial after he was involved in two on-court incidents during Phoenix's games against Blackwater Elite and TNT KaTropa. On May 31, Abueva was involved in a verbal altercation against Ray Parks' girlfriend Maika Rivera and did lewd gestures to her after their win against Blackwater. On June 2, he clotheslined TNT's import Terrence Jones. Abueva was also fined a total of P70,000 for both incidents.
- August 14: During the second quarter of game five of the PBA Commissioner's Cup, Arwind Santos made "monkey gestures" at the San Miguel bench addressing Jones after the latter committed a foul. Initially he refused to apologize stating "I’m going to apologize? No. It depends on him. If he was annoyed, he’s a real monkey." (Note: Translated from the Filipino language: "... "Sorry ako? Hindi. Depende ’yun sa kanya. Kung mapipikon siya, totoong monkey siya. Kung di ka mapipikon, di ka monkey.".) PBA Commissioner Willie Marcial summoned Santos the following day and was fined P200,000, 100 hours of community services. Santos will also undergo counseling on equality and racial discrimination. Santos later posted a public apology through his Twitter and Instagram accounts.

== Opening ceremonies ==
The opening ceremonies for this season were held at the Philippine Arena in Bocaue, Bulacan on January 13, 2019. The PBA Leo Awards for the 2017–18 season were held before the opening ceremonies.

The first game of the Philippine Cup between the Barangay Ginebra San Miguel and the TNT KaTropa was played after the opening ceremonies.

Below is the list of team muses:

Team	Muse	Ref.
Alaska Aces	Klea Pineda	
Barangay Ginebra San Miguel	Pia Wurtzbach	
Blackwater Elite	Myla Pablo and Jasmine Alkhaldi	
Columbian Dyip	Kelley Day	
Magnolia Hotshots Pambansang Manok	Sharon Cuneta	
Meralco Bolts	Eva Patalinjug	
NLEX Road Warriors	Alyssa Valdez	
NorthPort Batang Pier	Aya Fernandez	
Phoenix Pulse Fuel Masters	Yam Concepcion	
Rain or Shine Elasto Painters	Anie Uson	
San Miguel Beermen	Kylie Verzosa	
TNT KaTropa	Sam Pinto	

== 2019 PBA Philippine Cup ==
The 2019 Philippine Cup started on January 13, and ended on May 15, 2019.

=== Elimination round ===
Pos	Team	W	L	PCT	GB	Qualification
1	Phoenix Pulse Fuel Masters	9	2	.818	—	Twice-to-beat in the quarterfinals
2	Rain or Shine Elasto Painters	8	3	.727	1	Twice-to-beat in the quarterfinals
3	Barangay Ginebra San Miguel	7	4	.636 (Note: Head-to-head quotient: Barangay Ginebra 1.02, TNT 1.00, San Miguel 0.98)	2	Best-of-three quarterfinals
4	TNT KaTropa	7	4	.636	2	Best-of-three quarterfinals
5	San Miguel Beermen	7	4	.636	2	Best-of-three quarterfinals
6	Magnolia Hotshots Pambansang Manok	6	5	.545	3	Best-of-three quarterfinals
7	NorthPort Batang Pier	5	6	.455	4	Twice-to-win in the quarterfinals
8	Alaska Aces	4	7	.364 (Note: Head-to-head quotient: NLEX 1.19, Alaska 1.01, Columbian 0.84; 8th-seed playoff: Alaska 88–80 NLEX)	5	Twice-to-win in the quarterfinals
9	NLEX Road Warriors	4	7	.364	5	
10	Columbian Dyip	4	7	.364	5	
11	Meralco Bolts	3	8	.273	6	
12	Blackwater Elite	2	9	.182	7	

Source: PBA.ph
Rules for classification: 1) winning percentage; 2) if two teams are tied, head-to-head record; if three or more teams are tied, head-to-head goal average (quotient), if tied for 8th, one-game playoff; 3) overall quotient 4) coin toss

=== Playoffs ===
Quarterfinals
(#1 twice-to-beat)
1	Phoenix	91
8	Alaska	76
(Best-of-3)
4	TNT	1
5	San Miguel	2
(#2 twice-to-beat)
2	Rain or Shine	91
7	NorthPort	85
(Best-of-3)
3	Barangay Ginebra	1
6	Magnolia	2

Semifinals (Best-of-7)
1	Phoenix	1
5	San Miguel	4
2	Rain or Shine	3
6	Magnolia	4

Finals (Best-of-7)
5	San Miguel	4
6	Magnolia	3

==== Quarterfinals ====
Team 1	Series	Team 2	Game 1	Game 2
(1) Phoenix Pulse Fuel Masters*	1–0	(8) Alaska Aces	91–76	—
(2) Rain or Shine Elasto Painters*	1–0	(7) NorthPort Batang Pier	91–85	—

Team 1	Series	Team 2	Game 1	Game 2	Game 3
(3) Barangay Ginebra San Miguel	1–2	(6) Magnolia Hotshots Pambansang Manok	86–75	77–106	72–85
(4) TNT KaTropa	1–2	(5) San Miguel Beermen	78–80	93–88	86–96

*Team has twice-to-beat advantage. Team #1 only has to win once, while Team #2 has to win twice.

==== Semifinals ====
Team 1	Series	Team 2	Game 1	Game 2	Game 3	Game 4	Game 5	Game 6	Game 7
(1) Phoenix Pulse Fuel Masters	1–4	(5) San Miguel Beermen	88–100	82–92	92–90	91–114	94–105	—	—
(2) Rain or Shine Elasto Painters	3–4	(6) Magnolia Hotshots Pambansang Manok	84–77	92–80	74–85	91–94	74–82	91–81	60–63 (OT)

==== Finals ====
Team 1	Series	Team 2	Game 1	Game 2	Game 3	Game 4	Game 5	Game 6	Game 7
(5) San Miguel Beermen	4–3	(6) Magnolia Hotshots Pambansang Manok	94–99	108–101	82–86	114–98	86–88	98–86	72–71

- Finals MVP: June Mar Fajardo (San Miguel Beermen)
- Best Player of the Conference: June Mar Fajardo (San Miguel Beermen)

== 2019 PBA Commissioner's Cup ==
The 2019 Commissioner's Cup started on May 19, and ended on August 16, 2019.

=== Elimination round ===
Pos	Team	W	L	PCT	GB	Qualification
1	TNT KaTropa	10	1	.909	—	Twice-to-beat in the quarterfinals
2	NorthPort Batang Pier	9	2	.818	1	Twice-to-beat in the quarterfinals
3	Blackwater Elite	7	4	.636 (Note: Head-to-head record: Blackwater 1–0 Barangay Ginebra)	3	Best-of-three quarterfinals
4	Barangay Ginebra San Miguel	7	4	.636	3	Best-of-three quarterfinals
5	Magnolia Hotshots Pambansang Manok	5	6	.455 (Note: Head-to-head quotient: Magnolia 1.19, Rain or Shine 1.01, San Miguel 0.83)	5	Best-of-three quarterfinals
6	Rain or Shine Elasto Painters	5	6	.455	5	Best-of-three quarterfinals
7	San Miguel Beermen	5	6	.455	5	Twice-to-win in the quarterfinals
8	Alaska Aces	4	7	.364 (Note: Head-to-head quotient: Alaska 1.012, Meralco 1.011, Phoenix 0.977; 8th-seed playoff: Alaska 108–103 Meralco)	6	Twice-to-win in the quarterfinals
9	Meralco Bolts	4	7	.364	6	
10	Phoenix Pulse Fuel Masters	4	7	.364	6	
11	Columbian Dyip	3	8	.273 (Note: Head-to-head record: Columbian 1–0 NLEX)	7	
12	NLEX Road Warriors	3	8	.273	7	

Source: PBA.ph
Rules for classification: 1) winning percentage; 2) if two teams are tied, head-to-head record; if three or more teams are tied, head-to-head goal average (quotient), if tied for 8th, one-game playoff; 3) overall quotient 4) coin toss

=== Playoffs ===
Quarterfinals
(#1 twice-to-beat)
1	TNT	72	104
8	Alaska	108	93
(Best-of-3)
4	Barangay Ginebra	2
5	Magnolia	0
(#2 twice-to-beat)
2	NorthPort	84	88
7	San Miguel	98	90
(Best-of-3)
3	Blackwater	1
6	Rain or Shine	2

Semifinals (Best-of-5)
1	TNT	3
4	Barangay Ginebra	1
7	San Miguel	3
6	Rain or Shine	1

Finals (Best-of-7)
1	TNT	2
7	San Miguel	4

==== Quarterfinals ====
Team 1	Series	Team 2	Game 1	Game 2
(1) TNT KaTropa*	1–1	(8) Alaska Aces	72–108	104–93
(2) NorthPort Batang Pier*	0–2	(7) San Miguel Beermen	84–98	88–90

Team 1	Series	Team 2	Game 1	Game 2	Game 3
(3) Blackwater Elite	1–2	(6) Rain or Shine Elasto Painters	80–83	100–96	83–85
(4) Barangay Ginebra San Miguel	2–0	(5) Magnolia Hotshots Pambansang Manok	85–79	106–80	—

*Team has twice-to-beat advantage. Team 1 only has to win once, while Team 2 has to win twice.

==== Semifinals ====
Team 1	Series	Team 2	Game 1	Game 2	Game 3	Game 4	Game 5
(1) TNT KaTropa	3–1	(4) Barangay Ginebra San Miguel	95–92	88–71	72–80	103–92	—
(6) Rain or Shine Elasto Painters	1–3	(7) San Miguel Beermen	105–111	105–117	112–104	95–98	—

==== Finals ====
Team 1	Series	Team 2	Game 1	Game 2	Game 3	Game 4	Game 5	Game 6	Game 7
(1) TNT KaTropa	2–4	(7) San Miguel Beermen	109–96	125–127 (2OT)	115–105	101–106	94–99	90–102	—

- Finals MVP: Terrence Romeo (San Miguel Beermen)
- Best Player of the Conference: Jayson Castro (TNT KaTropa)
- Bobby Parks Best Import of the Conference: Terrence Jones (TNT KaTropa)

== 2019 PBA Governors' Cup ==
The 2019 Governors' Cup started on September 20, 2019, and ended on January 17, 2020.

=== Elimination round ===
Pos	Team	W	L	PCT	GB	Qualification
1	NLEX Road Warriors	8	3	.727 (Note: Head-to-head quotient: NLEX 1.090, Meralco 0.959, TNT 0.958)	—	Twice-to-beat in quarterfinals
2	Meralco Bolts	8	3	.727	—	Twice-to-beat in quarterfinals
3	TNT KaTropa	8	3	.727	—	Twice-to-beat in quarterfinals
4	Barangay Ginebra San Miguel	7	4	.636	1	Twice-to-beat in quarterfinals
5	San Miguel Beermen	6	5	.545 (Note: Head-to-head record: San Miguel 1–0 Magnolia)	2	Twice-to-win in quarterfinals
6	Magnolia Hotshots Pambansang Manok	6	5	.545	2	Twice-to-win in quarterfinals
7	Alaska Aces	5	6	.455 (Note: Head-to-head record: Alaska 1–0 NorthPort)	3	Twice-to-win in quarterfinals
8	NorthPort Batang Pier	5	6	.455	3	Twice-to-win in quarterfinals
9	Rain or Shine Elasto Painters	4	7	.364 (Note: Head-to-head record: Rain or Shine 1–0 Columbian)	4	
10	Columbian Dyip	4	7	.364	4	
11	Phoenix Pulse Fuel Masters	3	8	.273	5	
12	Blackwater Elite	2	9	.182	6	

Source: PBA.ph
Rules for classification: 1) winning percentage; 2) if two teams are tied, head to head record; if three or more teams are tied, head-to-head goal average (quotient), if tied for 8th, one-game playoff; 3) overall quotient 4) coin toss>

=== Playoffs ===
Quarterfinals (Top 4 twice-to-beat)
1	NLEX	90	123
8	NorthPort	115	126***
4	Barangay Ginebra	100
5	San Miguel	97
2	Meralco	94
7	Alaska	84
3	TNT	98
6	Magnolia	97

Semifinals (Best-of-5)
8	NorthPort	1
4	Barangay Ginebra	3
2	Meralco	3
3	TNT	2

Finals (Best-of-7)
4	Barangay Ginebra	4
2	Meralco	1

***Game went into triple overtime

==== Quarterfinals ====
Team 1	Series	Team 2	Game 1	Game 2
(1) NLEX Road Warriors*	0–2	(8) NorthPort Batang Pier	90–115	123–126 (3OT)
(2) Meralco Bolts*	1–0	(7) Alaska Aces	94–84	—
(3) TNT Tropang Giga*	1–0	(6) Magnolia Hotshots Pambansang Manok	98–97	—
(4) Barangay Ginebra San Miguel*	1–0	(5) San Miguel Beermen	100–97	—

*Team has twice-to-beat advantage. Team 1 only has to win once, while Team 2 has to win twice.

==== Semifinals ====
Team 1	Series	Team 2	Game 1	Game 2	Game 3	Game 4	Game 5
(2) Meralco Bolts	3–2	(3) TNT KaTropa	94–103	114–94	97–101	95–83	89–78
(4) Barangay Ginebra San Miguel	3–1	(8) NorthPort Batang Pier	90–124	113–88	132–105	120–107	—

==== Finals ====
Team 1	Series	Team 2	Game 1	Game 2	Game 3	Game 4	Game 5	Game 6	Game 7
(2) Meralco Bolts	1–4	(4) Barangay Ginebra San Miguel	87–91	104–102	84–92	72–94	93–105	—	—

- Finals MVP: Japeth Aguilar (Barangay Ginebra San Miguel)
- Best Player of the Conference: Christian Standhardinger (NorthPort Batang Pier)
- Bobby Parks Best Import of the Conference: Allen Durham (Meralco Bolts)

== Awards ==
=== Leo Awards ===
- Most Valuable Player: June Mar Fajardo (San Miguel)
- Rookie of the Year: CJ Perez (Columbian)
- Most Improved Player: Moala Tautuaa (San Miguel)
- First Mythical Team:
  - Jayson Castro (TNT)
  - CJ Perez (Columbian)
  - June Mar Fajardo (San Miguel)
  - Christian Standhardinger (NorthPort)
  - Sean Anthony (NorthPort)
- Second Mythical Team:
  - Roger Pogoy (TNT)
  - Stanley Pringle (Barangay Ginebra)
  - Japeth Aguilar (Barangay Ginebra)
  - Troy Rosario (TNT)
  - Ian Sangalang (Magnolia)
- All-Defensive Team:
  - CJ Perez (Columbian)
  - Chris Ross (San Miguel)
  - June Mar Fajardo (San Miguel)
  - Sean Anthony (NorthPort)
  - Japeth Aguilar (Barangay Ginebra)
- Samboy Lim Sportsmanship Award: Gabe Norwood (Rain or Shine)

=== PBA Press Corps Annual Awards ===
- Defensive Player of the Year: Sean Anthony (NorthPort)
- Scoring Champion: CJ Perez (Columbian)
- Baby Dalupan Coach of the Year: Leo Austria (San Miguel)
- Mr. Quality Minutes: Terrence Romeo (San Miguel)
- Danny Floro Executive of the Year: Ricky Vargas (TNT)
- Order of Merit: June Mar Fajardo (San Miguel)
- All-Rookie Team
  - CJ Perez (Columbian)
  - Robert Bolick (NorthPort)
  - Javee Mocon (Rain or Shine)
  - Bobby Ray Parks Jr. (TNT)
  - Abu Tratter (Alaska)
- All-Interview Team
  - Kiefer Ravena (NLEX)
  - Christian Standhardinger (NorthPort)
  - Beau Belga (Rain or Shine)
  - Vic Manuel (Alaska)
  - Arwind Santos (San Miguel)
  - Yeng Guiao (NLEX)
- Game of the Season: NorthPort vs. NLEX (November 27, 2019, Governors' Cup quarterfinals)
- President's Cup: Vergel Meneses

== PBA teams in Asian club competitions ==
Team	Competition	Progress
San Miguel Beermen	2019 Asia League Terrific 12	Fourth place
TNT KaTropa	2019 Asia League Terrific 12	Group stage

== Cumulative standings ==
Pos	Team	Pld	W	L	PCT	Best finish
1	TNT KaTropa	54	35	19	.648	Finalist
2	Barangay Ginebra San Miguel	52	33	19	.635	Champions
3	San Miguel Beermen	61	37	24	.607	Champions
4	NorthPort Batang Pier	42	22	20	.524	Semifinalist
5	Rain or Shine Elasto Painters	48	24	24	.500	Semifinalist
6	Magnolia Hotshots Pambansang Manok	53	26	27	.491	Finalist
7	Phoenix Pulse Fuel Masters	33	16	17	.485	Semifinalist
8	Meralco Bolts	45	20	25	.444	Finalist
9	NLEX Road Warriors	36	15	21	.417	Quarterfinalist
10	Alaska Aces	39	16	23	.410	Quarterfinalist
11	Blackwater Elite	36	12	24	.333	Quarterfinalist
12	Columbian Dyip	33	11	22	.333	Elimination round

=== Elimination round ===
Pos	Team	Pld	W	L	PCT
1	TNT KaTropa	33	25	8	.758
2	Barangay Ginebra San Miguel	33	21	12	.636
3	NorthPort Batang Pier	33	19	14	.576
4	San Miguel Beermen	33	18	15	.545
5	Rain or Shine Elasto Painters	33	17	16	.515 (Note: Elimination round head-to-head: Rain or Shine 2–1 Magnolia)
6	Magnolia Hotshots Pambansang Manok	33	17	16	.515
7	Phoenix Pulse Fuel Masters	33	16	17	.485
8	Meralco Bolts	33	15	18	.455 (Note: Elimination round head-to-head: NLEX 3–0 Meralco)
9	NLEX Road Warriors	33	15	18	.455
10	Alaska Aces	33	13	20	.394
11	Blackwater Elite	33	11	22	.333 (Note: Elimination round head-to-head: Blackwater 2–1 Columbian)
12	Columbian Dyip	33	11	22	.333

=== Playoffs ===
Pos	Team	Pld	W	L
1	San Miguel Beermen	28	19	9
2	Barangay Ginebra San Miguel	19	12	7
3	TNT KaTropa	21	10	11
4	Magnolia Hotshots Pambansang Manok	20	9	11
5	Rain or Shine Elasto Painters	15	7	8
6	Meralco Bolts	12	5	7
7	Alaska Aces	6	3	3
8	NorthPort Batang Pier	9	3	6
9	Phoenix Pulse Fuel Masters	6	2	4
10	Blackwater Elite	3	1	2
11	NLEX Road Warriors	3	0	3
12	Columbian Dyip	0	0	0
