= 2017–18 PBA season =

43rd PBA season

- Duration: December 17, 2017 – December 19, 2018
- Teams: 12
- TV partner(s): Local: ESPN 5 The 5 Network; PBA Rush (HD); International: AksyonTV International

2017 PBA draft
- Top draft pick: Christian Standhardinger
- Picked by: San Miguel Beermen
- Season MVP: June Mar Fajardo (San Miguel Beermen)
- Top scorer: Stanley Pringle (NorthPort Batang Pier)
- Philippine Cup champions: San Miguel Beermen
- Philippine Cup runners-up: Magnolia Hotshots Pambansang Manok
- Commissioner's Cup champions: Barangay Ginebra San Miguel
- Commissioner's Cup runners-up: San Miguel Beermen
- Governors' Cup champions: Magnolia Hotshots Pambansang Manok
- Governors' Cup runners-up: Alaska Aces

Seasons
- ← 2016–17 2019 →

The 2017–18 PBA season was the 43rd season of the Philippine Basketball Association. The league continued to use the three-conference format, starting with the Philippine Cup. The Commissioner's Cup and the Governors' Cup were the second and third conferences in the upcoming season.

The first event of the season was the 2017 PBA draft, held on October 29.

== Executive board ==
- Andres Y. Narvasa Jr. (Commissioner until December 31, 2017)
- Willie Marcial (officer-in-charge starting January 1, 2018, appointed commissioner on January 25, 2018)
- Victorico P. Vargas (Chairman, representing TNT KaTropa)
- Richard Bachmann (Vice-Chairman, representing Alaska Aces)
- Raymond Zorilla (Treasurer, representing Phoenix Fuel Masters)

== Teams ==
Team	Company	Governor	Coach	Captain
Alaska Aces	Alaska Milk Corporation	Richard Bachmann	Alex Compton	Jvee Casio
Barangay Ginebra San Miguel	Ginebra San Miguel, Inc.	Alfrancis Chua	Tim Cone	Sol Mercado
Blackwater Elite	Ever Bilena Cosmetics, Inc.	Silliman Sy	Bong Ramos	Allein Maliksi
GlobalPort Batang Pier / NorthPort Batang Pier	Sultan 900 Capital, Inc.	Eric Arejola	Pido Jarencio	Stanley Pringle
Kia Picanto / Columbian Dyip	Columbian Autocar Corporation	Bobby Rosales	Johnedel Cardel	Glenn Khobuntin
Magnolia Hotshots Pambansang Manok	San Miguel Pure Foods Company, Inc.	Rene Pardo	Chito Victolero	Mark Barroca
Meralco Bolts	Manila Electric Company	Al Panlilio	Norman Black	Chris Newsome
NLEX Road Warriors	Metro Pacific Investments Corporation	Ramoncito Fernandez	Yeng Guiao	Larry Fonacier
Phoenix Fuel Masters	Phoenix Petroleum Philippines, Inc.	Dennis Uy	Louie Alas	RJ Jazul
Rain or Shine Elasto Painters	Asian Coatings Philippines, Inc.	Mamerto Mondragon	Caloy Garcia	Gabe Norwood
San Miguel Beermen	San Miguel Brewery, Inc.	Robert Non	Leo Austria	Arwind Santos
TNT KaTropa	Smart Communications	Victorico Vargas	Bong Ravena	Jayson Castro

== Arenas ==
Like several Metro Manila-centric leagues, most games are held at arenas within Metro Manila, either the Smart Araneta Coliseum or the Mall of Asia Arena, and sometimes, in the Ynares Center in Antipolo. Games outside this area are called "out-of-town" games, and are usually played on Saturdays. Provincial arenas usually host one game, rarely two; these arenas typically host only once per season, but a league may return within a season if the turnout is satisfactory.

Typically, all playoff games are held in Metro Manila arenas, although playoff and Finals games have been seldom played in the provinces.

=== Main arenas ===
Main arenas of the PBA in Metro Manila and Rizal

Arena	City
Cuneta Astrodome	Pasay
Filoil Flying V Centre	San Juan
Mall of Asia Arena	Pasay
Smart Araneta Coliseum	Quezon City
Ynares Center	Antipolo

=== Out-of-town arenas ===
Provincial venues of the PBA that hosted one game day (red), and two or more game days (blue).

Highlighted are playoff games.

Arena	City	Date	Match-up
Philippine Arena	Bocaue, Bulacan	December 25, 2017	NLEX vs. GlobalPort; Barangay Ginebra vs. Magnolia
Philippine Arena	Bocaue, Bulacan	February 18, 2018	NLEX vs. Blackwater; Meralco vs. Barangay Ginebra
University of San Agustin Gym	Iloilo City	January 13, 2018	San Miguel vs. TNT
Calasiao Sports Complex	Calasiao, Pangasinan	February 10, 2018	Rain or Shine vs. Magnolia
Calasiao Sports Complex	Calasiao, Pangasinan	June 23, 2018	NLEX vs. San Miguel
Calasiao Sports Complex	Calasiao, Pangasinan	October 20, 2018	TNT vs. San Miguel
Batangas City Sports Coliseum	Batangas City	February 17, 2018	Alaska vs. San Miguel
Xavier University Gym	Cagayan de Oro	February 24, 2018	Magnolia vs. Meralco
Xavier University Gym	Cagayan de Oro	September 29, 2018	Phoenix vs. Barangay Ginebra
Alonte Sports Arena	Biñan, Laguna	May 11, 2018	NLEX vs. Phoenix; Barangay Ginebra vs. Blackwater
Alonte Sports Arena	Biñan, Laguna	October 27, 2018	Blackwater vs. Columbian; Rain or Shine vs. San Miguel
Angeles University Foundation Sports Arena & Cultural Center	Angeles	May 12, 2018	GlobalPort vs. Magnolia
Lambero Macias Sports Complex	Dumaguete, Negros Oriental	May 19, 2018	Alaska vs. San Miguel
Ibalong Centrum for Recreation	Legazpi, Albay	June 9, 2018	Barangay Ginebra vs. NLEX
City of Passi Arena	Passi, Iloilo	September 22, 2018	TNT vs. Rain or Shine
Santa Rosa Sports Complex	Santa Rosa, Laguna	October 7, 2018	Rain or Shine vs. Blackwater; Meralco vs. Barangay Ginebra
Quezon Convention Center	Lucena	October 13, 2018	Barangay Ginebra vs. Rain or Shine

== Transactions ==
=== Retirement ===
- October 30, 2017: Jayjay Helterbrand officially announced his retirement after playing 17 seasons in the PBA, all of them with the Barangay Ginebra San Miguel franchise.

=== Coaching changes ===
Team	Outgoing coach	Manner of departure	Date of vacancy	Replaced with	Date of appointment	Ref.
Phoenix Fuel Masters	Ariel Vanguardia	Resigned	Preseason	Louie Alas	October 26, 2017	
GlobalPort Batang Pier	Franz Pumaren	On leave	Preseason	Pido Jarencio	October 29, 2017	
Kia Picanto	Manny Pacquiao	End of contract	Preseason	Chris Gavina	November 4, 2017	
Kia Picanto	Chris Gavina	Resigned	Philippine Cup	Ricky Dandan	December 30, 2017	
Blackwater Elite	Leo Isaac	Fired	Commissioner's Cup	Bong Ramos	April 30, 2018	
Columbian Dyip	Ricky Dandan	Resigned	Commissioner's Cup	Johnedel Cardel	June 28, 2018	

=== Rule changes ===
The PBA competition committee approved the rule changes for implementation starting in the Commissioner's Cup games:

Rule changes (effective for the 2018 PBA Commissioner's Cup)
1. The number of 30-second timeouts were reduced from three (1 for 1st half, 2 for 2nd half) to two (1 for 1st half, 1 for second half)
2. Tapping the backboard in an attempt to block a shot from an offensive player will not be considered as a goal-tending violation.
3. Pulling of jerseys to impede the movement of an opponent will only be called as an ordinary foul unless there is a clear path to the basket for the offensive player

== Notable events ==
=== Pre-season ===
- November 2, 2017: The majority of the PBA Board of Governors passed a resolution stating that they will no longer support or endorse the renewal of Commissioner Chito Narvasa's tenure due to "loss of confidence". Representatives from Alaska, Blackwater, Meralco, NLEX, Rain or Shine, Phoenix and TNT attended a special board meeting on November 2 that passed this resolution. Deputy Commissioner and Technical Head Rickie Santos will be the league's officer-in-charge while the board will still tackle who will replace Narvasa as commissioner. Later in the afternoon, the bloc that composes the three San Miguel Corporation (SMC) teams (San Miguel, Barangay Ginebra and Star) as well as independent teams GlobalPort and Kia stated their continued support with Narvasa. Former PBA chairman Robert Non criticized the move done by the seven board members for making a "whimsical" decision in ousting Narvasa and mentioned that the move was unauthorized and non binding as per the league's by-laws. According to the PBA by-laws, a two-thirds vote of its current membership is necessary to remove or appoint a commissioner. Non also criticized the timing of the meeting when the meeting notice was only sent to all board representatives on Monday, October 30. According to the rules, the board representatives should have been notified seven days before the date set for the meeting. Narvasa later called a press conference at the PBA office in Libis and indicated that he will not resign as the commissioner. He is also requesting the seven teams that will not endorse his term renewal to explain the grounds of their "loss of confidence" to the current commissioner. He also stated that he is willing to resign the commissioner post, but after consultation with his family and lawyers, he will hold on as commissioner, given that any move to oust him should follow the rules stated in the league's by-laws.
- November 27, 2017: The Star Hotshots changed their name to Magnolia Hotshots. The team's new logo debuted during the team's press launching.
- December 11, 2017: The NLEX Road Warriors adopted a new logo. The new logo debuted during the team's press launching.
- December 17, 2017: PBA Commissioner Chito Narvasa officially tendered his resignation. The board of governors have advised Narvasa to stay as commissioner until December 31, 2017, to have a smooth transition to his eventual successor. The board also named Media Bureau chief Willie Marcial as the league's officer-in-charge.

=== Philippine Cup ===
- Mark Caguioa changed his jersey number from #47 to #13 to honor his recently retired teammate Jayjay Helterbrand. He will use the #13 jersey for the duration of the Philippine Cup.
- January 25, 2018: The PBA Board of Governors official appointed officer-in-charge Willie Marcial as the tenth commissioner of the league.
- March 27, 2018: The lifetime ban on Renaldo Balkman was lifted. The lifetime ban was imposed by former commissioner Chito Salud on March 13, 2013, due to an incident involving his former teammate Arwind Santos when Balkman grabbed Santos by the neck in the final minutes of their game against Alaska on March 8, 2013. Before lifting the ban, Commissioner Willie Marcial consulted Santos and former commissioner Salud and gave their approval.

=== Commissioner's Cup ===
- April 3, 2018: The Kia Picanto changed their name to Columbian Dyip. The team's new logo and uniforms will debut at the opening day of the Commissioner's Cup on April 22.

=== Governors' Cup ===
- August 10, 2018: The GlobalPort Batang Pier changed their name to NorthPort Batang Pier. The team's new logo debuted through their social media accounts.
- September 9, 2018: The Meralco Bolts will represent the Philippines in the 2018 FIBA Asia Champions Cup. This development came after FIBA Secretary-General Patrick Baumann requested the Samahang Basketbol ng Pilipinas to have a PBA team participate in the club championship.
- November 11, 2018: Former PBA commissioner and Board of Governors chairman Rey Marquez died.
- Major adjustments in the league calendar, particularly in the upcoming season were made during the league's annual board planning session in Las Vegas, Nevada, United States, primarily because of FIBA calendar changes. The start of the PBA's 44th season will be set on January 13. This will be the first time since 2002 that the league will open their season in January. The PBA Leo Awards will be held during the opening ceremonies of the 2019 season while the 2018 PBA draft is set on December 16.
- Starting the 2019 draft, trading the rights for the draft's number one pick will be banned.
- The term of Ricky Vargas as PBA chairman will be extended up to the 2019 season.

== Opening ceremonies ==
The opening ceremonies for this season was held at the Smart Araneta Coliseum in Quezon City on December 17, 2017. The first game of the Philippine Cup between the Phoenix Fuel Masters and the San Miguel Beermen immediately followed.

The muses for the participating teams are as follows:

Team	Muse
Alaska Aces	Taki Saito
Barangay Ginebra San Miguel	Myrtle Sarrosa
Blackwater Elite	Ashley Ortega
GlobalPort Batang Pier	Hillarie Parungao
Kia Picanto	Phoemela Baranda
Magnolia Hotshots Pambansang Manok	Maureen Wroblewitz
Meralco Bolts	Chanel Thomas
NLEX Road Warriors	Rachel Daquis
Phoenix Fuel Masters	Rhian Ramos
Rain or Shine Elasto Painters	Jannie Alipo-on
San Miguel Beermen	Lindsay Stalzer
TNT KaTropa	Laura Lehmann

== 2017–18 PBA Philippine Cup ==
=== Elimination round ===
Pos	Team	W	L	PCT	GB	Qualification
1	San Miguel Beermen	8	3	.727 (Note: Head-to-head record: San Miguel 1–0 Magnolia)	—	Twice-to-beat in the quarterfinals
2	Magnolia Hotshots Pambansang Manok	8	3	.727	—	Twice-to-beat in the quarterfinals
3	Alaska Aces	7	4	.636	1	Best-of-three quarterfinals
4	Barangay Ginebra San Miguel	6	5	.545 (Note: Head-to-head quotient: Barangay Ginebra 1.03, Rain or Shine 1.02, NLEX 0.95)	2	Best-of-three quarterfinals
5	Rain or Shine Elasto Painters	6	5	.545	2	Best-of-three quarterfinals
6	NLEX Road Warriors	6	5	.545	2	Best-of-three quarterfinals
7	GlobalPort Batang Pier	5	6	.455 (Note: Head-to-head quotient: GlobalPort 1.14, Phoenix 1.00, TNT 0.97, Blackwater 0.89; 8th seed playoff: TNT 118–97 Phoenix)	3	Twice-to-win in the quarterfinals
8	TNT KaTropa	5	6	.455	3	Twice-to-win in the quarterfinals
9	Phoenix Fuel Masters	5	6	.455	3	
10	Blackwater Elite	5	6	.455	3	
11	Meralco Bolts	4	7	.364	4	
12	Kia Picanto	1	10	.091	7	

Source: PBA.ph
Rules for classification: 1) winning percentage; 2) if two teams are tied, head to head record; if three or more teams are tied, head-to-head goal average (quotient), if tied for 8th, one-game playoff; 3) overall quotient 4) coin toss

=== Playoffs ===
Quarterfinals
(#1 twice-to-beat)
1	San Miguel	106
8	TNT	93
(Best-of-3)
4	Barangay Ginebra	2
5	Rain or Shine	0
(#2 twice-to-beat)
2	Magnolia	86
7	GlobalPort	79
(Best-of-3)
3	Alaska	0
6	NLEX	2

Semifinals (Best-of-7)
1	San Miguel	4
4	Barangay Ginebra	1
2	Magnolia	4
6	NLEX	2

Finals (Best-of-7)
1	San Miguel	4
2	Magnolia	1

==== Quarterfinals ====
Team 1	Series	Team 2	Game 1	Game 2
(1) San Miguel Beermen*	1–0	(8) TNT KaTropa	106–93	—
(2) Magnolia Hotshots Pambansang Manok*	1–0	(7) GlobalPort Batang Pier	86–79	—

Team 1	Series	Team 2	Game 1	Game 2	Game 3
(3) Alaska Aces	0–2	(6) NLEX Road Warriors	99–105	83–87	—
(4) Barangay Ginebra San Miguel	2–0	(5) Rain or Shine Elasto Painters	88–80	99–91	—

*Team has twice-to-beat advantage. Team #1 only has to win once, while Team #2 has to win twice.

==== Semifinals ====
Team 1	Series	Team 2	Game 1	Game 2	Game 3	Game 4	Game 5	Game 6	Game 7
(1) San Miguel Beermen	4–1	(4) Barangay Ginebra San Miguel	102–90	104–102 (OT)	87–95	102–81	100–94	—	—
(2) Magnolia Hotshots Pambansang Manok	4–2	(6) NLEX Road Warriors	87–88	99–84	106–99	79–91	87–78	96–89	—

==== Finals ====
Team 1	Series	Team 2	Game 1	Game 2	Game 3	Game 4	Game 5	Game 6	Game 7
(1) San Miguel Beermen	4–1	(2) Magnolia Hotshots Pambansang Manok	103–105	92–77	111–87	84–80	108–99 (2OT)	—	—

- Finals MVP: June Mar Fajardo (San Miguel Beermen)
- Best Player of the Conference: June Mar Fajardo (San Miguel Beermen)

== 2018 PBA Commissioner's Cup ==
=== Elimination round ===
Pos	Team	W	L	PCT	GB	Qualification
1	Rain or Shine Elasto Painters	9	2	.818	—	Twice-to-beat in the quarterfinals
2	Alaska Aces	8	3	.727 (Note: Head-to-head record: Alaska 1–0 TNT)	1	Twice-to-beat in the quarterfinals
3	TNT KaTropa	8	3	.727	1	Best-of-three quarterfinals
4	Meralco Bolts	7	4	.636	2	Best-of-three quarterfinals
5	Barangay Ginebra San Miguel	6	5	.545 (Note: Head-to-head quotient: Barangay Ginebra 1.07, San Miguel 1.02, Magnolia 0.92)	3	Best-of-three quarterfinals
6	San Miguel Beermen	6	5	.545	3	Best-of-three quarterfinals
7	Magnolia Hotshots Pambansang Manok	6	5	.545	3	Twice-to-win in the quarterfinals
8	GlobalPort Batang Pier	5	6	.455	4	Twice-to-win in the quarterfinals
9	Columbian Dyip	4	7	.364 (Note: Head-to-head record: Columbian 1–0 Phoenix)	5	
10	Phoenix Fuel Masters	4	7	.364	5	
11	NLEX Road Warriors	2	9	.182	7	
12	Blackwater Elite	1	10	.091	8	

Source: PBA.ph
Rules for classification: 1) winning percentage; 2) if two teams are tied, head to head record; if three or more teams are tied, head-to-head goal average (quotient); 3) overall quotient 4) coin toss

=== Playoffs ===
Quarterfinals
(#1 twice-to-beat)
1	Rain or Shine	113	103
8	GlobalPort	114	97
(Best-of-3)
4	Meralco	0
5	Barangay Ginebra	2
(#2 twice-to-beat)
2	Alaska	89
7	Magnolia	78
(Best-of-3)
3	TNT	0
6	San Miguel	2

Semifinals (Best-of-5)
1	Rain or Shine	1
5	Barangay Ginebra	3
2	Alaska	1
6	San Miguel	3

finals (Best-of-7)
5	Barangay Ginebra	4
6	San Miguel	2

==== Quarterfinals ====
Team 1	Series	Team 2	Game 1	Game 2
(1) Rain or Shine Elasto Painters*	1–1	(8) GlobalPort Batang Pier	113–114	103–97
(2) Alaska Aces*	1–0	(7) Magnolia Hotshots Pambansang Manok	89–78	—

Team 1	Series	Team 2	Game 1	Game 2	Game 3
(3) TNT KaTropa	0–2	(6) San Miguel Beermen	110–121	102–106	—
(4) Meralco Bolts	0–2	(5) Barangay Ginebra San Miguel	81–88	90–104	—

*Team has twice-to-beat advantage. Team #1 only has to win once, while Team #2 has to win twice.

==== Semifinals ====
Team 1	Series	Team 2	Game 1	Game 2	Game 3	Game 4	Game 5
(1) Rain or Shine Elasto Painters	1–3	(5) Barangay Ginebra San Miguel	89–102	109–100	72–75	94–96	—
(2) Alaska Aces	1–3	(6) San Miguel Beermen	79–92	94–105	125–104	99–104	—

==== Finals ====
Team 1	Series	Team 2	Game 1	Game 2	Game 3	Game 4	Game 5	Game 6	Game 7
(5) Barangay Ginebra San Miguel	4–2	(6) San Miguel Beermen	127–99	109–134	94–132	130–100	87–83	93–77	—

- Finals MVP: Scottie Thompson (Barangay Ginebra San Miguel)
- Best Player of the Conference: June Mar Fajardo (San Miguel Beermen)
- Bobby Parks Best Import of the Conference: Justin Brownlee (Barangay Ginebra San Miguel)

== 2018 PBA Governors' Cup ==
=== Elimination round ===
Pos	Team	W	L	PCT	GB	Qualification
1	Barangay Ginebra San Miguel	9	2	.818	—	Twice-to-beat in quarterfinals
2	Phoenix Fuel Masters	8	3	.727 (Note: Head-to-head quotient: Phoenix 1.011, Alaska 1.006, Magnolia 0.982)	1	Twice-to-beat in quarterfinals
3	Alaska Aces	8	3	.727	1	Twice-to-beat in quarterfinals
4	Magnolia Hotshots Pambansang Manok	8	3	.727	1	Twice-to-beat in quarterfinals
5	Blackwater Elite	7	4	.636	2	Twice-to-win in quarterfinals
6	San Miguel Beermen	6	5	.545	3	Twice-to-win in quarterfinals
7	Meralco Bolts	5	6	.455 (Note: Head-to-head record: Meralco 1–0 NLEX)	4	Twice-to-win in quarterfinals
8	NLEX Road Warriors	5	6	.455	4	Twice-to-win in quarterfinals
9	TNT KaTropa	4	7	.364	5	
10	Rain or Shine Elasto Painters	3	8	.273	6	
11	NorthPort Batang Pier	2	9	.182	7	
12	Columbian Dyip	1	10	.091	8	

Source: PBA.ph
Rules for classification: 1) winning percentage; 2) if two teams are tied, head-to-head record; if three or more teams are tied, head-to-head goal average (quotient); 3) overall quotient 4) coin toss

=== Playoffs ===
Quarterfinals (Top 4 twice-to-beat)
1	Barangay Ginebra	111
8	NLEX	75
4	Magnolia	103
5	Blackwater	99
2	Phoenix	74	103
7	Meralco	90	108*
3	Alaska	96
6	San Miguel	85

Semifinals (Best-of-5)
1	Barangay Ginebra	1
4	Magnolia	3
7	Meralco	1
3	Alaska	3

Finals (Best-of-7)
4	Magnolia	4
3	Alaska	2

*Game went into overtime.

==== Quarterfinals ====
Team 1	Series	Team 2	Game 1	Game 2
(1) Barangay Ginebra San Miguel*	1–0	(8) NLEX Road Warriors	111–75	—
(2) Phoenix Fuel Masters*	0–2	(7) Meralco Bolts	74–90	103–108 (OT)
(3) Alaska Aces*	1–0	(6) San Miguel Beermen	96–85	—
(4) Magnolia Hotshots Pambansang Manok*	1–0	(5) Blackwater Elite	103–99	—

*Team has twice-to-beat advantage. Team #1 only has to win once, while Team #2 has to win twice.

==== Semifinals ====
Team 1	Series	Team 2	Game 1	Game 2	Game 3	Game 4	Game 5
(1) Barangay Ginebra San Miguel	1–3	(4) Magnolia Hotshots Pambansang Manok	98–106	97–101	107–103	108–112	—
(3) Alaska Aces	3–1	(7) Meralco Bolts	92–97	100–95	104–102	99–92	—

==== Finals ====
Team 1	Series	Team 2	Game 1	Game 2	Game 3	Game 4	Game 5	Game 6	Game 7
(3) Alaska Aces	2–4	(4) Magnolia Hotshots Pambansang Manok	84–100	71–77	100–71	90–76	78–79	86–102	—

- Finals MVP: Mark Barroca (Magnolia Hotshots Pambansang Manok)
- Best Player of the Conference: Paul Lee (Magnolia Hotshots Pambansang Manok)
- Bobby Parks Best Import of the Conference: Mike Harris (Alaska Aces)

== Awards ==
=== Leo Awards ===
- Most Valuable Player: June Mar Fajardo (San Miguel)
- Rookie of the Year: Jason Perkins (Phoenix)
- Most Improved Player: Scottie Thompson (Barangay Ginebra)
- First Mythical Team:
  - Paul Lee (Magnolia)
  - Stanley Pringle (NorthPort)
  - Marcio Lassiter (San Miguel)
  - Japeth Aguilar (Barangay Ginebra)
  - June Mar Fajardo (San Miguel)
- Second Mythical Team:
  - Scottie Thompson (Barangay Ginebra)
  - Mark Barroca (Magnolia)
  - Matthew Wright (Phoenix)
  - Arwind Santos (San Miguel)
  - JP Erram (Blackwater)
- All-Defensive Team:
  - Chris Ross (San Miguel)
  - Rome dela Rosa (Alaska)
  - Gabe Norwood (Rain or Shine)
  - Rafi Reavis (Magnolia)
  - June Mar Fajardo (San Miguel)
- Samboy Lim Sportsmanship Award: Gabe Norwood (Rain or Shine)

=== PBA Press Corps Annual Awards ===
- Defensive Player of the Year: JP Erram (Blackwater)
- Scoring Champion: Stanley Pringle (NorthPort)
- Baby Dalupan Coach of the Year: Chito Victolero (Magnolia)
- Mr. Quality Minutes: Vic Manuel (Alaska)
- Breakout Player of the Year: Chris Tiu (Rain or Shine)
- Danny Floro Executive of the Year: Alfrancis Chua (Barangay Ginebra San Miguel)
- Order of Merit
  - June Mar Fajardo (San Miguel)
  - Paul Lee (Magnolia)
  - Vic Manuel (Alaska)
- All-Rookie Team
  - Paul Zamar (Blackwater)
  - Robbie Herndon (Magnolia)
  - Jeron Teng (Alaska)
  - Jason Perkins (Phoenix)
  - Christian Standhardinger (San Miguel)
- All-Interview Team
  - Yeng Guiao (NLEX)
  - Joe Devance (Barangay Ginebra)
  - Chris Ross (San Miguel)
  - Mike DiGregorio (Blackwater)
  - Christian Standhardinger (San Miguel)
  - Chris Tiu (Rain or Shine)
- Game of the Season: Barangay Ginebra vs. Rain or Shine (March 3, 2018, Philippine Cup eliminations)
- President's Cup: PBA Board
- PBA Press Corps Lifetime Achievement Award: Wilfred Uytengsu (team owner of Alaska)

== Statistics ==
=== Individual statistical leaders ===
==== Local players ====
Category	Player	Team	Statistic
Points per game	Stanley Pringle	NorthPort Batang Pier	21.0
Rebounds per game	June Mar Fajardo	San Miguel Beermen	12.3
Assists per game	Chris Banchero	Alaska Aces	5.9
Steals per game	Sean Anthony	NorthPort Batang Pier	2.0
Blocks per game	John Paul Erram	Blackwater Elite	2.0
Turnovers per game	Stanley Pringle	NorthPort Batang Pier	3.4
Fouls per game	Jason Perkins	Phoenix Fuel Masters	3.6
Minutes per game	Stanley Pringle	NorthPort Batang Pier	39.0
FG%	June Mar Fajardo	San Miguel Beermen	59.7%
FT%	JVee Casio	Alaska Aces	92.2%
3FG%	Chris Newsome	Meralco Bolts	43.3%
Double-doubles	June Mar Fajardo	San Miguel Beermen	32
Triple-doubles	Scottie Thompson	Barangay Ginebra San Miguel	2

==== Import players ====
Category	Player	Team	Statistic	Conference played
Points per game	Aaron Fuller	NLEX Road Warriors	31.1	Governors'
Rebounds per game	Mike Harris	Alaska Aces	20.0	Governors'
Assists per game	Allen Durham	Meralco Bolts	7.2	Governors'
Steals per game	Henry Walker	Blackwater Elite	2.2	Commissioner's and Governors'
Blocks per game	Eugene Phelps	Phoenix Fuel Masters	2.5	Commissioner's and Governors'
Turnovers per game	Akeem Wright	Columbian Dyip	4.7	Governors'
Fouls per game	Renaldo Balkman	San Miguel Beermen	3.8	Commissioner's
Minutes per game	Eugene Phelps	Phoenix Fuel Masters	42.7	Commissioner's and Governors'
FG%	Joshua Smith	TNT KaTropa	68.7%	Commissioner's
FT%	Justin Brownlee	Barangay Ginebra San Miguel	82.7%	Commissioner's and Governors'
3FG%	Kevin Murphy	San Miguel Beermen	44.2%	Governors'
Double-doubles	Justin Brownlee	Barangay Ginebra San Miguel	23	Commissioner's and Governors'
Triple-doubles	Justin Brownlee	Barangay Ginebra San Miguel	3	Commissioner's and Governors'

=== Individual game highs ===
==== Local players ====
Category	Player	Team	Statistic	Conference
Points	Stanley Pringle	GlobalPort Batang Pier	50	Commissioner's
Rebounds	Christian Standhardinger	San Miguel Beermen	22	Governors'
Assists	Scottie Thompson	Barangay Ginebra San Miguel	16	Philippine
Steals	Chris Ross	San Miguel Beermen	8	Philippine
Blocks	John Paul Erram	Blackwater Elite	7	Philippine
Blocks	Arwind Santos	San Miguel Beermen	7	Governors'
Three point field goals	Stanley Pringle	GlobalPort Batang Pier	9	Commissioner's
Three point field goals	Simon Enciso	Alaska Aces	9	Governors'

==== Import players ====
Category	Player	Team	Statistic	Conference
Points	Eugene Phelps	Phoenix Fuel Masters	51	Governors'
Rebounds	Mike Harris	Alaska Aces	27	Governors'
Assists	Justin Brownlee	Barangay Ginebra San Miguel	12	Commissioner's
Assists	Henry Walker	Blackwater Elite	12	Governors'
Assists	Romeo Travis	Magnolia Hotshots Pambansang Manok	12	Governors'
Assists	Allen Durham	Meralco Bolts	12	Governors'
Steals	Romeo Travis	Magnolia Hotshots Pambansang Manok	7	Governors'
Steals	Henry Walker	Blackwater Elite	7	Governors'
Blocks	Eugene Phelps	Phoenix Fuel Masters	8	Governors'
Three point field goals	Antonio Campbell	Alaska Aces	8	Commissioner's

=== Team statistical leaders ===
Category	Team	Statistic
Points per game	San Miguel Beermen	103.0
Rebounds per game	Phoenix Fuel Masters	52.7
Assists per game	Barangay Ginebra San Miguel	26.8
Steals per game	Magnolia Hotshots Pambansang Manok	9.7
Blocks per game	San Miguel Beermen	5.5
Turnovers per game	NorthPort Batang Pier	18.8
FG%	Barangay Ginebra San Miguel	46.2%
FT%	Barangay Ginebra San Miguel	72.5%
3FG%	Magnolia Hotshots Pambansang Manok	33.9%

== PBA teams in Asian club competitions ==
Team	Competition	Progress
Meralco Bolts	2018 FIBA Asia Champions Cup	Fourth place
Blackwater Elite	2018 Asia League Summer Super 8	Group stage
NLEX Road Warriors	2018 Asia League Summer Super 8	Fourth place

== Cumulative standings ==
Pos	Team	Pld	W	L	PCT	Best finish
1	San Miguel Beermen	57	36	21	.632 (Note: Head-to-head: San Miguel 5–3 Magnolia)	Champions
2	Magnolia Hotshots Pambansang Manok	57	36	21	.632	Champions
3	Barangay Ginebra San Miguel	57	35	22	.614	Champions
4	Alaska Aces	51	31	20	.608	Finalist
5	Rain or Shine Elasto Painters	41	20	21	.488	Semifinalist
6	TNT KaTropa	37	18	19	.486	Quarterfinalist
7	Phoenix Fuel Masters	36	17	19	.472	Quarterfinalist
8	Meralco Bolts	41	19	22	.463	Semifinalist
9	NLEX Road Warriors	42	17	25	.405	Semifinalist
10	Blackwater Elite	34	13	21	.382	Quarterfinalist
11	GlobalPort/NorthPort Batang Pier	36	13	23	.361	Quarterfinalist
12	Kia Picanto/Columbian Dyip	33	6	27	.182	Elimination round

=== Elimination round ===
Pos	Team	Pld	W	L	PCT
1	Alaska Aces	33	23	10	.697
2	Magnolia Hotshots Pambansang Manok	33	22	11	.667
3	Barangay Ginebra San Miguel	33	21	12	.636
4	San Miguel Beermen	33	20	13	.606
5	Rain or Shine Elasto Painters	33	18	15	.545
6	Phoenix Fuel Masters	33	17	16	.515 (Note: Elimination round head-to-head: Phoenix 2–1 TNT)
7	TNT KaTropa	33	17	16	.515
8	Meralco Bolts	33	16	17	.485
9	NLEX Road Warriors	33	13	20	.394 (Note: Elimination round head-to-head: Blackwater 3–0 NLEX)
10	Blackwater Elite	33	13	20	.394
11	GlobalPort/NorthPort Batang Pier	33	12	21	.364
12	Kia Picanto/Columbian Dyip	33	6	27	.182

=== Playoffs ===
Pos	Team	Pld	W	L
1	San Miguel Beermen	24	16	8
2	Magnolia Hotshots Pambansang Manok	24	14 (Note: Playoffs head-to-head: Magnolia 3–1 Barangay Ginebra)	10
3	Barangay Ginebra San Miguel	24	14	10
4	Alaska Aces	18	8	10
5	NLEX Road Warriors	9	4	5
6	Meralco Bolts	8	3	5
7	Rain or Shine Elasto Painters	8	2	6
8	GlobalPort/NorthPort Batang Pier	3	1	2
9	TNT KaTropa	4	1	3
10	Blackwater Elite	1	0	1
11	Phoenix Fuel Masters	3	0	3
12	Kia Picanto/Columbian Dyip	0	0	0
