= 2019 Magnolia Hotshots Pambansang Manok season =

- Head coach: Chito Victolero
- Owners: San Miguel-Pure Foods Co., Inc. (a San Miguel Corporation subsidiary)

Philippine Cup results
- Record: 6–5 (54.5%)
- Place: 6th
- Playoff finish: Runner-up (lost to San Miguel, 3–4)

Commissioner's Cup results
- Record: 5–6 (45.5%)
- Place: 5th
- Playoff finish: Quarterfinalist (lost to Barangay Ginebra, 0–2)

Governors' Cup results
- Record: 6–5 (54.5%)
- Place: 6th
- Playoff finish: Quarterfinalist (lost to TNT with twice-to-win disadvantage)

Magnolia Hotshots Pambansang Manok seasons

The 2019 Magnolia Hotshots Pambansang Manok season was the 31st season of the franchise in the Philippine Basketball Association (PBA).

== Key dates ==
=== 2018 ===
- December 16: The 2018 PBA draft took place in Midtown Atrium, Robinson Place Manila.

== Draft picks ==
Round	Pick	Player	Position	Nationality	PBA D-League team	College
1	10	Michael Calisaan	F	Philippines	Che'Lu Bar and Grill - SSC-R	San Sebastian
2	15	Jeepy Faundo	C	Philippines	Che'Lu Bar and Grill - SSC-R	Santo Tomas

== Roster ==
2019 Magnolia Hotshots Pambansang Manok roster
Players
Coaches

Pos.	#	POB	Name	Height	Weight	DOB (YYYY–MM–DD)	From
G	2	(Philippines)	Justin Melton	5 ft 11 in (1.80 m)	163 lb (74 kg)	1987–04–07	Mount Olive
G	3	(Philippines)	Paul Lee	6 ft 0 in (1.83 m)	200 lb (91 kg)	1989–02–14	UE
C	4	(United States)	Rafi Reavis (C)	6 ft 8 in (2.03 m)	210 lb (95 kg)	1977–07–26	Coppin State
G	6	(Philippines)	Jio Jalalon	5 ft 9 in (1.75 m)	150 lb (68 kg)	1992–08–02	Arellano
G	8	(Philippines)	Peter June Simon	6 ft 0 in (1.83 m)	180 lb (82 kg)	1980–06–01	Mindanao
F/C	10	(Philippines)	Ian Sangalang	6 ft 7 in (2.01 m)	212 lb (96 kg)	1991–12–20	San Sebastian
F	11	(Philippines)	Michael Calisaan	6 ft 4 in (1.93 m)		1995–02–27	San Sebastian
F	12	(Philippines)	Riego Gamalinda	6 ft 3 in (1.91 m)	184 lb (83 kg)	1986–05–25	San Beda
G	14	(Philippines)	Mark Barroca	5 ft 10 in (1.78 m)	170 lb (77 kg)	1986–04–25	Far Eastern
F	15	(Philippines)	Marc Pingris	6 ft 4 in (1.93 m)	210 lb (95 kg)	1981–10–16	PSBA
F/C	17	(Philippines)	Aldrech Ramos	6 ft 6 in (1.98 m)	190 lb (86 kg)	1988–04–03	Far Eastern
F	19	(United States)	Rome dela Rosa	6 ft 3 in (1.91 m)	185 lb (84 kg)	1990–12–11	San Beda
G	22	(United States)	Chris Banchero	6 ft 1 in (1.85 m)	175 lb (79 kg)	1989–01–24	Seattle Pacific
G	29	(Philippines)	Alvin Abundo	5 ft 8 in (1.73 m)	150 lb (68 kg)	1992–10–29	Centro Escolar
F/C	32	(United States)	Kyle Pascual	6 ft 6 in (1.98 m)	210 lb (95 kg)	1990–04–13	San Beda

Head coach

- (Philippines) Chito Victolero

Assistant coach(es)

- (Philippines) Jason Webb (1st Assistant)
- (Philippines) Johnny Abarrientos
- (Philippines) Mon Jose
- (Philippines) Angelito Esguerra
- (Philippines) Tony Boy Espinosa
- (Philippines) Juno Sauler
- (Philippines) Paul Sorongon

Team manager

- (Philippines) Alvin Patrimonio

Legend

- (C) Team captain
- (CI) Commissioner's Cup Import
- (GI) Governors' Cup Import
- (EI) EASL Import
- (DP) Unsigned draft pick
- (FA) Free agent
- (IN) Inactive
- (S) Suspended
- (R) Rookie
- Injured

Roster

== Philippine Cup ==
=== Eliminations ===
==== Standings ====
Pos	Team	W	L	PCT	GB	Qualification
1	Phoenix Pulse Fuel Masters	9	2	.818	—	Twice-to-beat in the quarterfinals
2	Rain or Shine Elasto Painters	8	3	.727	1	Twice-to-beat in the quarterfinals
3	Barangay Ginebra San Miguel	7	4	.636 (Note: Head-to-head quotient: Barangay Ginebra 1.02, TNT 1.00, San Miguel 0.98)	2	Best-of-three quarterfinals
4	TNT KaTropa	7	4	.636	2	Best-of-three quarterfinals
5	San Miguel Beermen	7	4	.636	2	Best-of-three quarterfinals
6	Magnolia Hotshots Pambansang Manok	6	5	.545	3	Best-of-three quarterfinals
7	NorthPort Batang Pier	5	6	.455	4	Twice-to-win in the quarterfinals
8	Alaska Aces	4	7	.364 (Note: Head-to-head quotient: NLEX 1.19, Alaska 1.01, Columbian 0.84; 8th-seed playoff: Alaska 88–80 NLEX)	5	Twice-to-win in the quarterfinals
9	NLEX Road Warriors	4	7	.364	5	
10	Columbian Dyip	4	7	.364	5	
11	Meralco Bolts	3	8	.273	6	
12	Blackwater Elite	2	9	.182	7	

Source: PBA.ph
Rules for classification: 1) winning percentage; 2) if two teams are tied, head-to-head record; if three or more teams are tied, head-to-head goal average (quotient), if tied for 8th, one-game playoff; 3) overall quotient 4) coin toss

==== Game log ====
2019 PBA Philippine Cup game log
Total: 6–5
February: 0–3

Game	Date	Opponent	Score	High points	High rebounds	High assists	Location Attendance	Record
1	February 3	TNT	L 75–80 (OT)	Robbie Herndon (16)	Barroca, Sangalang (9)	Jio Jalalon (8)	Mall of Asia Arena	0–1
2	February 10	San Miguel	L 92–113	Ian Sangalang (19)	Rafi Reavis (6)	Mark Barroca (4)	Smart Araneta Coliseum	0–2
3	February 13	Rain or Shine	L 74–75	Barroca, Sangalang (16)	Ian Sangalang (18)	Jio Jalalon (5)	Mall of Asia Arena	0–3

March: 5–2

Game	Date	Opponent	Score	High points	High rebounds	High assists	Location Attendance	Record
4	March 2	Meralco	W 92–86	Jio Jalalon (19)	Ian Sangalang (16)	Barroca, Jalalon (4)	Xavier University Gym	1–3
5	March 6	Phoenix	L 87–89	Barroca, Lee (16)	Rafi Reavis (8)	Jio Jalalon (9)	Smart Araneta Coliseum	1–4
6	March 9	Alaska	W 103–86	Ian Sangalang (24)	Ian Sangalang (14)	Ian Sangalang (6)	Ynares Center	2–4
7	March 13	Columbian	W 109–83	Ian Sangalang (16)	dela Rosa, Jalalon, Lee (7)	Barroca, Lee (6)	Smart Araneta Coliseum	3–4
8	March 17	Barangay Ginebra	L 93–97 (OT)	Mark Barroca (23)	Ian Sangalang (13)	Barroca, Sangalang (7)	Smart Araneta Coliseum	3–5
9	March 20	NorthPort	W 103–90	Paul Lee (24)	Rafi Reavis (10)	Barroca, Melton (5)	Smart Araneta Coliseum	4–5
10	March 22	Blackwater	W 97–87	Rome dela Rosa (17)	Brondial, Sangalang (10)	Barroca, Sangalang (5)	Ynares Center	5–5

April: 1–0

Game	Date	Opponent	Score	High points	High rebounds	High assists	Location Attendance	Record
11	April 3	NLEX	W 102–74	Paul Lee (26)	Rodney Brondial (9)	Jio Jalalon (5)	Smart Araneta Coliseum	6–5

=== Playoffs ===
==== Bracket ====
Quarterfinals
(#1 twice-to-beat)
1	Phoenix	91
8	Alaska	76
(Best-of-3)
4	TNT	1
5	San Miguel	2
(#2 twice-to-beat)
2	Rain or Shine	91
7	NorthPort	85
(Best-of-3)
3	Barangay Ginebra	1
6	Magnolia	2

Semifinals (Best-of-7)
1	Phoenix	1
5	San Miguel	4
2	Rain or Shine	3
6	Magnolia	4

Finals (Best-of-7)
5	San Miguel	4
6	Magnolia	3

==== Game log ====
2019 PBA Philippine Cup playoffs game log
Total: 9–8
Quarterfinals: 2–1

Game	Date	Opponent	Score	High points	High rebounds	High assists	Location Attendance	Series
1	April 6	Barangay Ginebra	L 75–86	Paul Lee (15)	Rodney Brondial (9)	Barroca, Lee, Sangalang (3)	Mall of Asia Arena	0–1
2	April 8	Barangay Ginebra	W 106–77	Ian Sangalang (21)	Ian Sangalang (9)	Jio Jalalon (6)	Smart Araneta Coliseum	1–1
3	April 10	Barangay Ginebra	W 85–72	Paul Lee (25)	Ian Sangalang (10)	Jio Jalalon (6)	Smart Araneta Coliseum; 11,147	2–1

Semifinals: 4–3

Game	Date	Opponent	Score	High points	High rebounds	High assists	Location Attendance	Series
1	April 12	Rain or Shine	L 77–84	Paul Lee (15)	Rafi Reavis (10)	Paul Lee (6)	Smart Araneta Coliseum	0–1
2	April 14	Rain or Shine	L 80–93	Herndon, Sangalang (13)	Jio Jalalon (8)	Jio Jalalon (5)	Smart Araneta Coliseum	0–2
3	April 16	Rain or Shine	W 85–74	Lee, Sangalang (16)	Reavis, Sangalang (11)	Mark Barroca (6)	Smart Araneta Coliseum	1–2
4	April 22	Rain or Shine	W 94–91	Ian Sangalang (19)	Rafi Reavis (11)	Jio Jalalon (4)	Smart Araneta Coliseum	2–2
5	April 24	Rain or Shine	W 82–74	Barroca, Jalalon (14)	Rafi Reavis (12)	Barroca, Jalalon (3)	Cuneta Astrodome	3–2
6	April 26	Rain or Shine	L 81–91	Ian Sangalang (19)	Reavis, Sangalang (8)	Jio Jalalon (8)	Ynares Center	3–3
7	April 28	Rain or Shine	W 63–60 (OT)	Lee, Sangalang (11)	Rafi Reavis (20)	Jio Jalalon (4)	Mall of Asia Arena	4–3

Finals: 3–4

Game	Date	Opponent	Score	High points	High rebounds	High assists	Location Attendance	Series
1	May 1	San Miguel	W 99–94	Paul Lee (18)	Ian Sangalang (12)	Paul Lee (5)	Smart Araneta Coliseum	1–0
2	May 3	San Miguel	L 101–108	Ian Sangalang (18)	Paul Lee (10)	Jio Jalalon (8)	Smart Araneta Coliseum	1–1
3	May 5	San Miguel	W 86–82	Mark Barroca (22)	Reavis, Sangalang (15)	Jio Jalalon (5)	Smart Araneta Coliseum	2–1
4	May 8	San Miguel	L 98–114	Barroca, Jalalon (22)	Ian Sangalang (11)	Jio Jalalon (5)	Smart Araneta Coliseum	2–2
5	May 10	San Miguel	W 88–86	Mark Barroca (22)	Ian Sangalang (14)	Jio Jalalon (9)	Smart Araneta Coliseum	3–2
6	May 12	San Miguel	L 86–98	Jio Jalalon (17)	Paul Lee (7)	Jio Jalalon (8)	Smart Araneta Coliseum	3–3
7	May 15	San Miguel	L 71–72	Ian Sangalang (18)	Rafi Reavis (8)	Jalalon, Lee (6)	Smart Araneta Coliseum	3–4

== Commissioner's Cup ==
=== Eliminations ===
==== Standings ====
Pos	Team	W	L	PCT	GB	Qualification
1	TNT KaTropa	10	1	.909	—	Twice-to-beat in the quarterfinals
2	NorthPort Batang Pier	9	2	.818	1	Twice-to-beat in the quarterfinals
3	Blackwater Elite	7	4	.636 (Note: Head-to-head record: Blackwater 1–0 Barangay Ginebra)	3	Best-of-three quarterfinals
4	Barangay Ginebra San Miguel	7	4	.636	3	Best-of-three quarterfinals
5	Magnolia Hotshots Pambansang Manok	5	6	.455 (Note: Head-to-head quotient: Magnolia 1.19, Rain or Shine 1.01, San Miguel 0.83)	5	Best-of-three quarterfinals
6	Rain or Shine Elasto Painters	5	6	.455	5	Best-of-three quarterfinals
7	San Miguel Beermen	5	6	.455	5	Twice-to-win in the quarterfinals
8	Alaska Aces	4	7	.364 (Note: Head-to-head quotient: Alaska 1.012, Meralco 1.011, Phoenix 0.977; 8th-seed playoff: Alaska 108–103 Meralco)	6	Twice-to-win in the quarterfinals
9	Meralco Bolts	4	7	.364	6	
10	Phoenix Pulse Fuel Masters	4	7	.364	6	
11	Columbian Dyip	3	8	.273 (Note: Head-to-head record: Columbian 1–0 NLEX)	7	
12	NLEX Road Warriors	3	8	.273	7	

Source: PBA.ph
Rules for classification: 1) winning percentage; 2) if two teams are tied, head-to-head record; if three or more teams are tied, head-to-head goal average (quotient), if tied for 8th, one-game playoff; 3) overall quotient 4) coin toss

==== Game log ====
2019 PBA Commissioner's Cup game log
Total: 5–6
June: 5–2

Game	Date	Opponent	Score	High points	High rebounds	High assists	Location Attendance	Record
1	June 5	Alaska	L 80–103	Ian Sangalang (17)	Ian Sangalang (9)	Rome dela Rosa (3)	Smart Araneta Coliseum	0–1
2	June 12	NorthPort	L 99–102	Ian Sangalang (21)	James Farr (14)	Paul Lee (8)	Smart Araneta Coliseum	0–2
3	June 14	NLEX	W 98–88	James Farr (24)	James Farr (21)	Paul Lee (6)	Mall of Asia Arena	1–2
4	June 16	Columbian	W 110–103	Farr, Sangalang (22)	Jio Jalalon (12)	Jio Jalalon (7)	Smart Araneta Coliseum	2–2
5	June 22	Phoenix	W 99–96	Paul Lee (27)	James Farr (18)	Paul Lee (7)	Cuneta Astrodome	3–2
6	June 26	San Miguel	W 118–82	James Farr (19)	James Farr (18)	Jio Jalalon (10)	Smart Araneta Coliseum	4–2
7	June 29	Meralco	W 99–88	Mark Barroca (21)	James Farr (17)	Mark Barroca (7)	Mayor Vitaliano D. Agan Coliseum	5–2

July: 0–4

Game	Date	Opponent	Score	High points	High rebounds	High assists	Location Attendance	Record
8	July 5	Blackwater	L 99–104 (OT)	Paul Lee (25)	James Farr (20)	Paul Lee (8)	Mall of Asia Arena	5–3
9	July 7	Barangay Ginebra	L 81–102	James Farr (34)	James Farr (21)	Paul Lee (6)	Smart Araneta Coliseum	5–4
10	July 10	Rain or Shine	L 82–86	Ian Sangalang (24)	James Farr (23)	Mark Barroca (9)	Smart Araneta Coliseum	5–5
11	July 17	TNT	L 83–98	Paul Lee (23)	James Farr (14)	Christmas, Jalalon, Melton (3)	Smart Araneta Coliseum	5–6

=== Playoffs ===
==== Bracket ====
Quarterfinals
(#1 twice-to-beat)
1	TNT	72	104
8	Alaska	108	93
(Best-of-3)
4	Barangay Ginebra	2
5	Magnolia	0
(#2 twice-to-beat)
2	NorthPort	84	88
7	San Miguel	98	90
(Best-of-3)
3	Blackwater	1
6	Rain or Shine	2

Semifinals (Best-of-5)
1	TNT	3
4	Barangay Ginebra	1
7	San Miguel	3
6	Rain or Shine	1

Finals (Best-of-7)
1	TNT	2
7	San Miguel	4

==== Game log ====
2019 PBA Commissioner's Cup playoffs game log
Total: 0–2
Quarterfinals: 0–2

Game	Date	Opponent	Score	High points	High rebounds	High assists	Location Attendance	Series
1	July 20	Barangay Ginebra	L 79–85	Paul Lee (24)	Rakeem Christmas (14)	Jio Jalalon (4)	Mall of Asia Arena	0–1
2	July 23	Barangay Ginebra	L 80–106	Mark Barroca (17)	Jio Jalalon (10)	Jio Jalalon (6)	Smart Araneta Coliseum	0–2

== Governors' Cup ==
=== Eliminations ===
==== Standings ====
Pos	Team	W	L	PCT	GB	Qualification
1	NLEX Road Warriors	8	3	.727 (Note: Head-to-head quotient: NLEX 1.090, Meralco 0.959, TNT 0.958)	—	Twice-to-beat in quarterfinals
2	Meralco Bolts	8	3	.727	—	Twice-to-beat in quarterfinals
3	TNT KaTropa	8	3	.727	—	Twice-to-beat in quarterfinals
4	Barangay Ginebra San Miguel	7	4	.636	1	Twice-to-beat in quarterfinals
5	San Miguel Beermen	6	5	.545 (Note: Head-to-head record: San Miguel 1–0 Magnolia)	2	Twice-to-win in quarterfinals
6	Magnolia Hotshots Pambansang Manok	6	5	.545	2	Twice-to-win in quarterfinals
7	Alaska Aces	5	6	.455 (Note: Head-to-head record: Alaska 1–0 NorthPort)	3	Twice-to-win in quarterfinals
8	NorthPort Batang Pier	5	6	.455	3	Twice-to-win in quarterfinals
9	Rain or Shine Elasto Painters	4	7	.364 (Note: Head-to-head record: Rain or Shine 1–0 Columbian)	4	
10	Kia Picanto	4	7	.364	4	
11	Phoenix Pulse Fuel Masters	3	8	.273	5	
12	Blackwater Elite	2	9	.182	6	

Source: PBA.ph
Rules for classification: 1) winning percentage; 2) if two teams are tied, head to head record; if three or more teams are tied, head-to-head goal average (quotient), if tied for 8th, one-game playoff; 3) overall quotient 4) coin toss>

==== Bracket ====
Quarterfinals (Top 4 twice-to-beat)
1	NLEX	90	123
8	NorthPort	115	126***
4	Barangay Ginebra	100
5	San Miguel	97
2	Meralco	94
7	Alaska	84
3	TNT	98
6	Magnolia	97

Semifinals (Best-of-5)
8	NorthPort	1
4	Barangay Ginebra	3
2	Meralco	3
3	TNT	2

Finals (Best-of-7)
4	Barangay Ginebra	4
2	Meralco	1

***Game went into triple overtime

== Awards ==
Recipient	Award	Date awarded	Ref.
Ian Sangalang	Philippine Cup Player of the Week	March 26, 2019	
