= Don Trollano =

Filipino basketball player (born 1992)

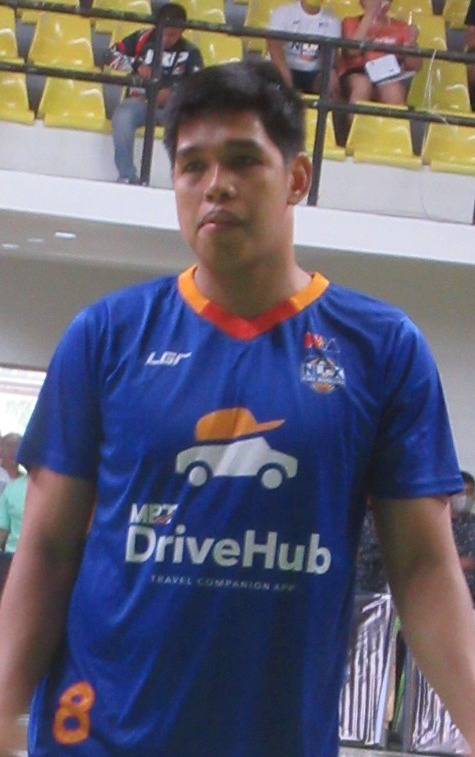
- Trollano in 2023

No. 2 – San Miguel Beermen
- Position: Small forward / power forward
- League: PBA

Personal information
- Born: January 7, 1992 (age 34) Gigmoto, Catanduanes, Philippines
- Listed height: 6 ft 3 in (1.91 m)
- Listed weight: 160 lb (73 kg)

Career information
- High school: Trace College
- College: Adamson
- PBA draft: 2015: 2nd round, 15th overall pick
- Drafted by: Rain or Shine Elasto Painters
- Playing career: 2015–present

Career history
- 2015–2018: Rain or Shine Elasto Painters
- 2018–2019: TNT KaTropa
- 2019–2020: Blackwater Elite
- 2021–2023: NLEX Road Warriors
- 2023–present: San Miguel Beermen

Career highlights
- 4× PBA champion (2016 Commissioner's, 2023–24 Commissioner's, 2025 Philippine, 2025–26 Philippine); 2× PBA All-Star (2024, 2026); PBA Mr. Quality Minutes (2025)

Celedonio "Don" B. Trollano Jr. (born January 7, 1992) is a Filipino professional basketball player for the San Miguel Beermen of the Philippine Basketball Association (PBA).

== College and amateur career ==
Trollano studied at Adamson University and played for the Adamson Falcons from 2012 to 2014. He also suited up for the Cagayan Rising Suns of the PBA Developmental League.

== Professional career ==
Trollano was drafted by the Rain or Shine Elasto Painters with the 15th overall pick in the 2015 PBA draft.

On October 25, 2015, Trollano recorded 8 points, 3 rebounds and 4 assists in a win over the Columbian Dyip in his 2nd career game played. On November 11, 2015, Trollano recorded his first double-digit scoring output as he scored 12 points to go along with 3 rebounds in a win over the Alaska Aces. In the 2016 Commissioner's Cup, which was Trollano's rookie year, he won his first championship.

In 2018, he was traded to the TnT Katropa for Norbert Torres. In Game 3 of the 2019 Commissioner's Cup Finals, he scored a playoff career-high 18 points. The next conference, Trollano scored a career high 19 points in a win against the Columbian Dyip.

During the 2019 Governor's Cup, he was traded to the Blackwater Elite along with Anthony Semerad and a first-round draft pick for Bobby Ray Parks Jr. In 2020, he scored 23 points, 7 rebounds, and 4 assists in a 96–109 loss.

Trollano was on the move again after the NLEX Road Warriors gave the No. 4 pick to Blackwater for him, Maurice Shaw, Roi Sumang, and the Bossing's 2022 second-round draft pick. The Bossing then transferred the draft selection for Simon Enciso, David Semerad, TNT's 2023 first-round draft pick and 2024 second-round draft pick in the trade. This reunited him with the coach he won his first championship with, Yeng Guiao.

In the 2022 Philippine Cup, he hit a game-winning shot against TNT. In a win against the Meralco Bolts, he scored 11 of his 19 points in the fourth quarter to help NLEX pull away for the win. In December 2022, Trollano signed a two-year extension with the team, which came after he scored a career-high 26 points in two different games during the Commissioner's Cup. On March 2, 2023, in a Governors' Cup win over the Terrafirma Dyip, he hit a new career-high with 44 points, and broke the PBA's all-time record for consecutive triples without a miss with nine straight as well.

On December 11, 2023, Trollano was traded to the San Miguel Beermen in a three-team trade involving San Miguel, NLEX, and NorthPort Batang Pier.

== Career statistics ==
Legend
GP	Games played	MPG	Minutes per game	FG%	Field-goal percentage
3FG%	3-point field-goal percentage	4P%	4-point field-goal percentage	FT%	Free-throw percentage
RPG	Rebounds per game	APG	Assists per game	SPG	Steals per game
BPG	Blocks per game	PPG	Points per game	127	Career high

As of the end of 2025–26 season

=== PBA ===
Year	Team	GP	MPG	FG%	3P%	4P%	FT%	RPG	APG	SPG	BPG	PPG
2015–16	Rain or Shine	44	11.2	.390	.348	—	.483	1.5	.7	.2	.0	3.7
2016–17	Rain or Shine	28	11.4	.402	.327	—	.875	2.0	.4	.2	.1	4.2
2017–18	Rain or Shine	30	17.1	.324	.258	—	.657	3.1	.6	.4	.1	5.5
2017–18	TNT	30	17.1	.324	.258	—	.657	3.1	.6	.4	.1	5.5
2019	TNT	47	27.3	.394	.318	—	.600	5.6	1.3	.5	.1	9.5
2019	Blackwater	47	27.3	.394	.318	—	.600	5.6	1.3	.5	.1	9.5
2020	Blackwater	11	29.0	.376	.255	—	.760	8.5	1.3	.3	.3	14.2
2021	NLEX	30	28.3	.441	.355	—	.667	5.6	1.9	.6	.3	10.5
2022–23	NLEX	37	32.7	.469	.438	—	.804	5.4	2.4	.8	.4	16.2
2023–24	NLEX	45	25.7	.515	.395	—	.800	4.7	1.1	.5	.1	12.3
2023–24	San Miguel	45	25.7	.515	.395	—	.800	4.7	1.1	.5	.1	12.3
2024–25	San Miguel	56	21.8	.473	.336	.313	.760	3.3	1.0	.5	.1	10.4
2025–26	San Miguel	51	24.2	.456	.348	.333	.782	4.1	1.8	.6	.2	15.1
Career		379	22.7	.442	.353	.326	.744	4.1	1.3	.5	.2	10.2

=== UAAP ===
Year	Team	GP	MPG	FG%	3P%	FT%	RPG	APG	SPG	BPG	PPG
2012–13	Adamson	13	8.23	.333	.273	.250	1.1	.3	.1	–	1.8
2013–14	Adamson	14	14.5	.412	.302	.636	3.4	.6	.3	.3	7.4
2014–15	Adamson	13	30.8	.355	.211	.731	7.8	1.5	.5	.8	15.8
Career		40	17.5	.370	.248	.662	6.0	3.1	.6	.4	8.3

== Personal life ==
Trollano is married to Patricia Palacol. He his wife have two sons together.
