= 2019 TNT KaTropa season =

- Head coach: Bong Ravena
- Consultant: Mark Dickel
- General manager: Gabby Cui; Miguel Fernandez (assistant)
- Owners: Smart Communications (an MVP Group subsidiary)

Philippine Cup results
- Record: 7–4 (63.6%)
- Place: 4th
- Playoff finish: Quarterfinalist (lost to San Miguel, 1–2)

Commissioner's Cup results
- Record: 10–1 (90.9%)
- Place: 1st
- Playoff finish: Runner-up (lost to San Miguel, 2–4)

Governors' Cup results
- Record: 8–3 (72.7%)
- Place: 3rd
- Playoff finish: Semifinalist (lost to Meralco, 2–3)

TNT KaTropa seasons

The 2019 TNT KaTropa season was the 29th season of the franchise in the Philippine Basketball Association (PBA).

== Key dates ==
=== 2018 ===
- December 16: The 2018 PBA draft took place in Midtown Atrium, Robinson Place Manila.

== Draft picks ==
Round	Pick	Player	Position	Nationality	PBA D-League team	College
3	28	Jeffrey Ongteco	C/F	Philippines	Flying V	Benilde
4	37	C. J. Isit	G	Canada	Batangas-EAC	Mapúa

== Roster ==
2019 TNT KaTropa roster
Players
Coaches

Pos.	#	POB	Name	Height	Weight	DOB (YYYY–MM–DD)	From
G/F	0	(Philippines)	Bobby Ray Jr. Parks (R)	6 ft 4 in (1.93 m)	215 lb (98 kg)	1993–02–19	National-U
G	1	(United States)	Michael DiGregorio	6 ft 1 in (1.85 m)	185 lb (84 kg)	1990–12–12	McKendree
F	4	(United States)	Harvey Carey	6 ft 3 in (1.91 m)	210 lb (95 kg)	1979–03–18	Sonoma State
F/C	5	(Philippines)	Frank Golla (IN)	6 ft 5 in (1.96 m)	290 lb (132 kg)	1990–01–17	Ateneo
F	9	(Philippines)	Samboy de Leon	6 ft 3 in (1.91 m)	190 lb (86 kg)	1992–03–09	Centro Escolar
G	10	(Philippines)	Ryan Reyes	6 ft 2 in (1.88 m)	190 lb (86 kg)	1983–08–10	Cal State Fullerton
F/C	12	(Philippines)	Marion Magat	6 ft 7 in (2.01 m)	180 lb (82 kg)	1989–10–22	National-U
F	14	(Australia)	David Semerad	6 ft 4 in (1.93 m)	220 lb (100 kg)	1991–04–25	San Beda
G/F	16	(Philippines)	Roger Pogoy	6 ft 3 in (1.91 m)	180 lb (82 kg)	1992–06–16	Far Eastern
G	17	(Philippines)	Jayson Castro (C)	5 ft 10 in (1.78 m)	185 lb (84 kg)	1986–06–30	Philippine Christian
F	18	(Philippines)	Troy Rosario	6 ft 7 in (2.01 m)	198 lb (90 kg)	1992–01–20	National-U
F/C	19	(Philippines)	Ken Bono (IN)	6 ft 5 in (1.96 m)	280 lb (127 kg)	1984–06–19	Adamson
F/C	21	(United States)	Kelly Williams	6 ft 6 in (1.98 m)	215 lb (98 kg)	1982–02–07	Oakland
G	26	(Philippines)	Almond Vosotros	5 ft 10 in (1.78 m)	165 lb (75 kg)	1990–01–26	De La Salle
F	32	(Philippines)	Jay Washington	6 ft 7 in (2.01 m)	210 lb (95 kg)	1981–10–10	Eckerd
G	40	(Philippines)	John Karlo Casiño	5 ft 10 in (1.78 m)	170 lb (77 kg)		Centro Escolar
C	99	(Palestine)	Yousef Taha	6 ft 7 in (2.01 m)	240 lb (109 kg)	1988–07–08	Mapúa

Head coach

- (Philippines) Bong Ravena

Assistant coach(es)

- (Philippines) Sandy Arespacochaga (1st assistant)
- (Philippines) Yuri Escueta
- (United States) Alton Lister
- (Philippines) Josh Reyes
- (New Zealand) Tab Baldwin
- (New Zealand) Mark Dickel (consultant)

Team manager

- (Philippines) Gabby Cui
- (Philippines) Miguel Fernandez (assistant)

Legend

- (C) Team captain
- (CI) Commissioner's Cup Import
- (GI) Governors' Cup Import
- (EI) EASL Import
- (DP) Unsigned draft pick
- (FA) Free agent
- (IN) Inactive
- (S) Suspended
- (R) Rookie
- Injured

Roster

== Philippine Cup ==
=== Eliminations ===
==== Standings ====
Pos	Team	W	L	PCT	GB	Qualification
1	Phoenix Pulse Fuel Masters	9	2	.818	—	Twice-to-beat in the quarterfinals
2	Rain or Shine Elasto Painters	8	3	.727	1	Twice-to-beat in the quarterfinals
3	Barangay Ginebra San Miguel	7	4	.636 (Note: Head-to-head quotient: Barangay Ginebra 1.02, TNT 1.00, San Miguel 0.98)	2	Best-of-three quarterfinals
4	TNT KaTropa	7	4	.636	2	Best-of-three quarterfinals
5	San Miguel Beermen	7	4	.636	2	Best-of-three quarterfinals
6	Magnolia Hotshots Pambansang Manok	6	5	.545	3	Best-of-three quarterfinals
7	NorthPort Batang Pier	5	6	.455	4	Twice-to-win in the quarterfinals
8	Alaska Aces	4	7	.364 (Note: Head-to-head quotient: NLEX 1.19, Alaska 1.01, Columbian 0.84; 8th-seed playoff: Alaska 88–80 NLEX)	5	Twice-to-win in the quarterfinals
9	NLEX Road Warriors	4	7	.364	5	
10	Columbian Dyip	4	7	.364	5	
11	Meralco Bolts	3	8	.273	6	
12	Blackwater Elite	2	9	.182	7	

Source: PBA.ph
Rules for classification: 1) winning percentage; 2) if two teams are tied, head-to-head record; if three or more teams are tied, head-to-head goal average (quotient), if tied for 8th, one-game playoff; 3) overall quotient 4) coin toss

==== Game log ====
2019 PBA Philippine Cup game log
Total: 7–4
January: 2–3

Game	Date	Opponent	Score	High points	High rebounds	High assists	Location Attendance	Record
1	January 13	Barangay Ginebra	L 79–90	Roger Pogoy (21)	Roger Pogoy (16)	Jayson Castro (10)	Philippine Arena; 23,711	0–1
2	January 19	Phoenix	L 84–93 (OT)	Roger Pogoy (30)	Roger Pogoy (12)	Castro, Heruela (4)	Ynares Center	0–2
3	January 23	NLEX	W 85–80	Roger Pogoy (20)	Pogoy, Taha, Trollano, Williams (7)	Heruela, Reyes (4)	Smart Araneta Coliseum	1–2
4	January 27	San Miguel	W 104–93	Jayson Castro (24)	Roger Pogoy (10)	Jayson Castro (11)	Smart Araneta Coliseum	2–2
5	January 30	Meralco	L 77–88	Jayson Castro (20)	Kelly Williams (15)	Brian Heruela (5)	Cuneta Astrodome	2–3

February : 1–0

Game	Date	Opponent	Score	High points	High rebounds	High assists	Location Attendance	Record
6	February 3	Magnolia	W 80–75 (OT)	Roger Pogoy (26)	Kelly Williams (13)	Jayson Castro (4)	Mall of Asia Arena	3–3

March : 4–1

Game	Date	Opponent	Score	High points	High rebounds	High assists	Location Attendance	Record
7	March 3	Rain or Shine	W 100–92	Castro, Rosario (20)	Castro, A. Semerad, Taha, Washington (7)	Jayson Castro (10)	Ynares Center	4–3
8	March 9	Blackwater	W 127–89	Roger Pogoy (28)	Kelly Williams (7)	Jericho Cruz (9)	Ynares Center	5–3
9	March 15	Alaska	W 92–78	Roger Pogoy (24)	Kelly Williams (11)	Kelly Williams (9)	Cuneta Astrodome	6–3
10	March 22	Columbian	W 101–98	Jayson Castro (20)	Yousef Taha (10)	Jayson Castro (7)	Ynares Center	7–3
11	March 24	NorthPort	L 83–109	Don Trollano (15)	Trollano, Williams (7)	Jayson Castro (7)	Smart Araneta Coliseum	7–4

=== Playoffs ===
==== Bracket ====
Quarterfinals
(#1 twice-to-beat)
1	Phoenix	91
8	Alaska	76
(Best-of-3)
4	TNT	1
5	San Miguel	2
(#2 twice-to-beat)
2	Rain or Shine	91
7	NorthPort	85
(Best-of-3)
3	Barangay Ginebra	1
6	Magnolia	2

Semifinals (Best-of-7)
1	Phoenix	1
5	San Miguel	4
2	Rain or Shine	3
6	Magnolia	4

Finals (Best-of-7)
5	San Miguel	4
6	Magnolia	3

==== Game log ====
2019 PBA Philippine Cup playoffs game log
Total: 1–2
Quarterfinals: 1–2

Game	Date	Opponent	Score	High points	High rebounds	High assists	Location Attendance	Series
1	April 6	San Miguel	L 78–80	Troy Rosario (23)	Rosario, Williams (9)	Jayson Castro (7)	Mall of Asia Arena	0–1
2	April 8	San Miguel	W 93–88	Roger Pogoy (20)	Troy Rosario (12)	Jayson Castro (9)	Smart Araneta Coliseum	1–1
3	April 10	San Miguel	L 86–96	Roger Pogoy (16)	Yousef Taha (13)	Brian Heruela (4)	Smart Araneta Coliseum; 11,147	1–2

== Commissioner's Cup ==
=== Eliminations ===
==== Standings ====
Pos	Team	W	L	PCT	GB	Qualification
1	TNT KaTropa	10	1	.909	—	Twice-to-beat in the quarterfinals
2	NorthPort Batang Pier	9	2	.818	1	Twice-to-beat in the quarterfinals
3	Blackwater Elite	7	4	.636 (Note: Head-to-head record: Blackwater 1–0 Barangay Ginebra)	3	Best-of-three quarterfinals
4	Barangay Ginebra San Miguel	7	4	.636	3	Best-of-three quarterfinals
5	Magnolia Hotshots Pambansang Manok	5	6	.455 (Note: Head-to-head quotient: Magnolia 1.19, Rain or Shine 1.01, San Miguel 0.83)	5	Best-of-three quarterfinals
6	Rain or Shine Elasto Painters	5	6	.455	5	Best-of-three quarterfinals
7	San Miguel Beermen	5	6	.455	5	Twice-to-win in the quarterfinals
8	Alaska Aces	4	7	.364 (Note: Head-to-head quotient: Alaska 1.012, Meralco 1.011, Phoenix 0.977; 8th-seed playoff: Alaska 108–103 Meralco)	6	Twice-to-win in the quarterfinals
9	Meralco Bolts	4	7	.364	6	
10	Phoenix Pulse Fuel Masters	4	7	.364	6	
11	Columbian Dyip	3	8	.273 (Note: Head-to-head record: Columbian 1–0 NLEX)	7	
12	NLEX Road Warriors	3	8	.273	7	

Source: PBA.ph
Rules for classification: 1) winning percentage; 2) if two teams are tied, head-to-head record; if three or more teams are tied, head-to-head goal average (quotient), if tied for 8th, one-game playoff; 3) overall quotient 4) coin toss

==== Game log ====
2019 PBA Commissioner's Cup game log
Total: 10–1
May: 2–1

Game	Date	Opponent	Score	High points	High rebounds	High assists	Location Attendance	Record
1	May 22	NLEX	W 102–87	Terrence Jones (41)	Terrence Jones (14)	Jayson Castro (5)	Ynares Center	1–0
2	May 25	Alaska	W 99–85	Terrence Jones (43)	Terrence Jones (22)	Terrence Jones (5)	Smart Araneta Coliseum	2–0
3	May 29	NorthPort	L 86–110	Troy Rosario (22)	Terrence Jones (14)	Terrence Jones (5)	Mall of Asia Arena	2–1

June : 5–0

Game	Date	Opponent	Score	High points	High rebounds	High assists	Location Attendance	Record
4	June 2	Phoenix	W 114–88	Terrence Jones (40)	Jayson Castro (13)	Jayson Castro (11)	Ynares Center	3–1
4	June 8	San Miguel	W 110–97	Terrence Jones (30)	Terrence Jones (18)	Jayson Castro (15)	Ynares Center	4–1
6	June 12	Barangay Ginebra	W 104–96	Roger Pogoy (37)	Terrence Jones (14)	Terrence Jones (16)	Smart Araneta Coliseum	5–1
7	June 15	Meralco	W 104–91	Terrence Jones (49)	Terrence Jones (18)	Heruela, Jones (4)	Smart Araneta Coliseum	6–1
8	June 21	Columbian	W 109–102	Terrence Jones (39)	Terrence Jones (17)	Castro, Jones (6)	Cuneta Astrodome	7–1

July : 3–0

Game	Date	Opponent	Score	High points	High rebounds	High assists	Location Attendance	Record
9	July 3	Rain or Shine	W 102–81	Terrence Jones (33)	Terrence Jones (21)	Terrence Jones (13)	Smart Araneta Coliseum	8–1
10	July 7	Blackwater	W 115–97	Terrence Jones (36)	Terrence Jones (16)	Terrence Jones (14)	Smart Araneta Coliseum	9–1
11	July 17	Magnolia	W 98–83	Terrence Jones (26)	Terrence Jones (13)	Terrence Jones (8)	Smart Araneta Coliseum	10–1

=== Playoffs ===
==== Bracket ====
Quarterfinals
(#1 twice-to-beat)
1	TNT	72	104
8	Alaska	108	93
(Best-of-3)
4	Barangay Ginebra	2
5	Magnolia	0
(#2 twice-to-beat)
2	NorthPort	84	88
7	San Miguel	98	90
(Best-of-3)
3	Blackwater	1
6	Rain or Shine	2

Semifinals (Best-of-5)
1	TNT	3
4	Barangay Ginebra	1
7	San Miguel	3
6	Rain or Shine	1

Finals (Best-of-7)
1	TNT	2
7	San Miguel	4

==== Game log ====
2019 PBA Commissioner's Cup playoffs game log
Total: 6–6
Quarterfinals: 1–1

Game	Date	Opponent	Score	High points	High rebounds	High assists	Location Attendance	Series
1	July 21	Alaska	L 72–108	Jayson Castro (23)	Jones, Trollano (6)	Jayson Castro (3)	Smart Araneta Coliseum	0–1
2	July 24	Alaska	W 104–93	Terrence Jones (37)	Terrence Jones (22)	Terrence Jones (9)	Smart Araneta Coliseum	1–1

Semifinals: 3–1

Game	Date	Opponent	Score	High points	High rebounds	High assists	Location Attendance	Series
1	July 26	Barangay Ginebra	W 95–92	Jones, Rosario (24)	Terrence Jones (12)	Terrence Jones (7)	Smart Araneta Coliseum	1–0
2	July 28	Barangay Ginebra	W 88–71	Jayson Castro (20)	Terrence Jones (19)	Terrence Jones (10)	Smart Araneta Coliseum	2–0
3	July 30	Barangay Ginebra	L 72–80	Terrence Jones (24)	Terrence Jones (18)	Jayson Castro (7)	Mall of Asia Arena	2–1
4	August 1	Barangay Ginebra	W 103–92	Terrence Jones (24)	Terrence Jones (13)	Terrence Jones (10)	Smart Araneta Coliseum	3–1

Finals: 2–4

Game	Date	Opponent	Score	High points	High rebounds	High assists	Location Attendance	Series
1	August 4	San Miguel	W 109–96	Terrence Jones (41)	Terrence Jones (12)	Terrence Jones (8)	Smart Araneta Coliseum	1–0
2	August 7	San Miguel	L 125–127 (2OT)	Troy Rosario (34)	Terrence Jones (13)	Jayson Castro (12)	Smart Araneta Coliseum	1–1
3	August 9	San Miguel	W 115–105	Terrence Jones (37)	Terrence Jones (18)	Terrence Jones (9)	Smart Araneta Coliseum	2–1
4	August 11	San Miguel	L 101–106	Terrence Jones (32)	Terrence Jones (16)	Jayson Castro (9)	Smart Araneta Coliseum	2–2
5	August 14	San Miguel	L 94–99	Terrence Jones (35)	Terrence Jones (17)	Terrence Jones (8)	Smart Araneta Coliseum	2–3
6	August 16	San Miguel	L 94–99	Terrence Jones (41)	Terrence Jones (12)	Jayson Castro (6)	Smart Araneta Coliseum	2–4

== Governors' Cup ==
=== Eliminations ===
==== Standings ====
Pos	Team	W	L	PCT	GB	Qualification
1	NLEX Road Warriors	8	3	.727 (Note: Head-to-head quotient: NLEX 1.090, Meralco 0.959, TNT 0.958)	—	Twice-to-beat in quarterfinals
2	Meralco Bolts	8	3	.727	—	Twice-to-beat in quarterfinals
3	TNT KaTropa	8	3	.727	—	Twice-to-beat in quarterfinals
4	Barangay Ginebra San Miguel	7	4	.636	1	Twice-to-beat in quarterfinals
5	San Miguel Beermen	6	5	.545 (Note: Head-to-head record: San Miguel 1–0 Magnolia)	2	Twice-to-win in quarterfinals
6	Magnolia Hotshots Pambansang Manok	6	5	.545	2	Twice-to-win in quarterfinals
7	Alaska Aces	5	6	.455 (Note: Head-to-head record: Alaska 1–0 NorthPort)	3	Twice-to-win in quarterfinals
8	NorthPort Batang Pier	5	6	.455	3	Twice-to-win in quarterfinals
9	Rain or Shine Elasto Painters	4	7	.364 (Note: Head-to-head record: Rain or Shine 1–0 Columbian)	4	
10	Columbian Dyip	4	7	.364	4	
11	Phoenix Pulse Fuel Masters	3	8	.273	5	
12	Blackwater Elite	2	9	.182	6	

Source: PBA.ph
Rules for classification: 1) winning percentage; 2) if two teams are tied, head to head record; if three or more teams are tied, head-to-head goal average (quotient), if tied for 8th, one-game playoff; 3) overall quotient 4) coin toss>

=== Game log ===
2019 PBA Governors' Cup game log
Total: 8–3
September: 2–0

Game	Date	Opponent	Score	High points	High rebounds	High assists	Location Attendance	Record
1	September 25	Blackwater	W 135–107	K. J. McDaniels (41)	K. J. McDaniels (22)	Jayson Castro (12)	Smart Araneta Coliseum	1–0
2	September 28	Rain or Shine	W 103–91	K. J. McDaniels (37)	K. J. McDaniels (13)	Jayson Castro (7)	Smart Araneta Coliseum	2–0

October: 5–1

Game	Date	Opponent	Score	High points	High rebounds	High assists	Location Attendance	Record
3	October 2	Phoenix	W 123–118	McDaniels, Rosario (32)	K. J. McDaniels (8)	K. J. McDaniels (6)	Smart Araneta Coliseum	3–0
4	October 5	Columbian	W 125–120	K. J. McDaniels (29)	K. J. McDaniels (17)	Castro, McDaniels (6)	Ynares Center	4–0
5	October 9	NorthPort	W 103–100	K. J. McDaniels (30)	K. J. McDaniels (18)	Jayson Castro (6)	Cuneta Astrodome	5–0
6	October 12	Meralco	W 116–113	K. J. McDaniels (51)	K. J. McDaniels (10)	Jayson Castro (4)	Smart Araneta Coliseum	6–0
7	October 18	Alaska	W 99–93 (OT)	K. J. McDaniels (37)	K. J. McDaniels (13)	K. J. McDaniels (5)	Ynares Center	7–0
8	October 25	NLEX	L 113–126	K. J. McDaniels (42)	K. J. McDaniels (13)	K. J. McDaniels (8)	Smart Araneta Coliseum	7–1

November : 1–2

Game	Date	Opponent	Score	High points	High rebounds	High assists	Location Attendance	Record
9	November 8	Barangay Ginebra	L 93–96	K. J. McDaniels (32)	K. J. McDaniels (12)	K. J. McDaniels (6)	Smart Araneta Coliseum	7–2
10	November 15	Magnolia	L 93–100	K. J. McDaniels (33)	K. J. McDaniels (15)	Bobby Ray Parks Jr. (5)	University of Southeastern Philippines Gym	7–3
11	November 20	San Miguel	W 114–109	K. J. McDaniels (44)	K. J. McDaniels (12)	Jayson Castro (11)	Ynares Center	8–3

==== Bracket ====
Quarterfinals (Top 4 twice-to-beat)
1	NLEX	90	123
8	NorthPort	115	126***
4	Barangay Ginebra	100
5	San Miguel	97
2	Meralco	94
7	Alaska	84
3	TNT	98
6	Magnolia	97

Semifinals (Best-of-5)
8	NorthPort	1
4	Barangay Ginebra	3
2	Meralco	3
3	TNT	2

Finals (Best-of-7)
4	Barangay Ginebra	4
2	Meralco	1

***Game went into triple overtime

== Transactions ==
=== Trades ===
==== Preseason ====
December
December 19, 2018	To TNT David Semerad; Brian Heruela; 2021 first round pick	To San Miguel Terrence Romeo

December 28, 2018	To TNT Michael Miranda (from NLEX); 2022 second round pick (from San Miguel via Blackwater)	To Blackwater Abu Tratter (from NLEX); Paul Desiderio (from NLEX); Alfrancis Tamsi (from TNT); 2022 second round pick (from TNT)	To NLEX John Paul Erram (from Blackwater); Philip Paredes (from TNT)

=== Recruited imports ===
Conference	Name	Country	Number	Debuted	Last game	Record
Commissioner's Cup	Terrence Jones	(United States)	1	May 22 (vs. NLEX)	August 16 (vs. San Miguel)	16–7
Governors' Cup	K. J. McDaniels	(United States)	11	September 25 (vs. Blackwater)	December 23 (vs. Meralco)	11–6

== Awards ==
Recipient	Award	Date awarded	Ref.
Jayson Castro	Philippine Cup Player of the Week	January 28, 2019	
