= 2019 Meralco Bolts season =

- Head coach: Norman Black
- Owners: Manila Electric Company (an MVP Group subsidiary)

Philippine Cup results
- Record: 3–8 (27.3%)
- Place: 11th
- Playoff finish: Did not qualify

Commissioner's Cup results
- Record: 4–7 (36.4%)
- Place: 9th
- Playoff finish: Did not qualify

Governors' Cup results
- Record: 8–3 (72.7%)
- Place: 2nd
- Playoff finish: Runner-up (lost to Barangay Ginebra, 1–4)

Meralco Bolts seasons

The 2019 Meralco Bolts season was the 9th season of the franchise in the Philippine Basketball Association (PBA).

== Key dates ==
=== 2018 ===
- December 16: The 2018 PBA draft took place in Midtown Atrium, Robinson Place Manila.

== Draft picks ==
Round	Pick	Player	Position	Nationality	PBA D-League team	College
1	5	Trevis Jackson	G	United States	Gamboa Coffee Mixers	Sacramento State
2	14	Bong Quinto	G/F	Philippines	Wang's Basketball Couriers	Letran
3	27	Steven Cudal	F	Philippines	Zark's Jawbreakers	UE

== Roster ==
2019 Meralco Bolts roster
Players
Coaches

Pos.	#	POB	Name	Height	Weight	DOB (YYYY–MM–DD)	From
F/C	00	(Philippines)	Bryan Faundo	6 ft 6 in (1.98 m)	225 lb (102 kg)	1984–02–18	Letran
G	2	(United States)	Trevis Jackson (R)	5 ft 11 in (1.80 m)	171 lb (78 kg)	–09–13	Sacramento State
F	6	(Philippines)	Raymar Jose	6 ft 4 in (1.93 m)	210 lb (95 kg)	1992–08–06	Far Eastern
F	7	(United States)	Cliff Hodge	6 ft 4 in (1.93 m)	195 lb (88 kg)	1988–02–03	Reedley
F	8	(Philippines)	Nico Salva	6 ft 3 in (1.91 m)	194 lb (88 kg)	1990–03–08	Ateneo
G	9	(Philippines)	Baser Amer	6 ft 0 in (1.83 m)	170 lb (77 kg)	1992–09–29	San Beda
G	10	(Philippines)	John Pinto	5 ft 10 in (1.78 m)	195 lb (88 kg)	1990–10–15	Arellano
G/F	11	(United States)	Chris Newsome	6 ft 2 in (1.88 m)	190 lb (86 kg)	1990–06–25	Ateneo
G	17	(Philippines)	Anjo Caram	5 ft 7 in (1.70 m)	159 lb (72 kg)	1991–01–14	San Beda
F	19	(Philippines)	Bong Quinto (R)	6 ft 1 in (1.85 m)		1994–12–15	Letran
C	20	(Philippines)	Raymond Almazan	6 ft 8 in (2.03 m)	194 lb (88 kg)	1989–08–02	Letran
F	21	(Philippines)	Reynel Hugnatan (C)	6 ft 4 in (1.93 m)	210 lb (95 kg)	1978–11–03	Manila
F	22	(Philippines)	Allein Maliksi	6 ft 4 in (1.93 m)	180 lb (82 kg)	1987–09–18	UST
F	33	(Philippines)	Ranidel de Ocampo	6 ft 6 in (1.98 m)	210 lb (95 kg)	1981–12–08	Saint Francis of Assisi
F	81	(Philippines)	Jammer Jamito (IN)	6 ft 5 in (1.96 m)	190 lb (86 kg)	1990–09–01	St. Clare

Head coach

- (United States) Norman Black

Assistant coach(es)

- (Philippines) Ronnie Magsanoc (1st Assistant)
- (Philippines) Gene Afable
- (Philippines) Patrick Fran
- (Philippines) Christopher Tan
- (Philippines) Luigi Trillo

Team manager

- (Philippines) Paolo Trillo

Legend

- (C) Team captain
- (CI) Commissioner's Cup Import
- (GI) Governors' Cup Import
- (EI) EASL Import
- (DP) Unsigned draft pick
- (FA) Free agent
- (IN) Inactive
- (S) Suspended
- (R) Rookie
- Injured

Roster

== Philippine Cup ==
=== Eliminations ===
==== Standings ====
Pos	Team	W	L	PCT	GB	Qualification
1	Phoenix Pulse Fuel Masters	9	2	.818	—	Twice-to-beat in the quarterfinals
2	Rain or Shine Elasto Painters	8	3	.727	1	Twice-to-beat in the quarterfinals
3	Barangay Ginebra San Miguel	7	4	.636 (Note: Head-to-head quotient: Barangay Ginebra 1.02, TNT 1.00, San Miguel 0.98)	2	Best-of-three quarterfinals
4	TNT KaTropa	7	4	.636	2	Best-of-three quarterfinals
5	San Miguel Beermen	7	4	.636	2	Best-of-three quarterfinals
6	Magnolia Hotshots Pambansang Manok	6	5	.545	3	Best-of-three quarterfinals
7	NorthPort Batang Pier	5	6	.455	4	Twice-to-win in the quarterfinals
8	Alaska Aces	4	7	.364 (Note: Head-to-head quotient: NLEX 1.19, Alaska 1.01, Columbian 0.84; 8th-seed playoff: Alaska 88–80 NLEX)	5	Twice-to-win in the quarterfinals
9	NLEX Road Warriors	4	7	.364	5	
10	Columbian Dyip	4	7	.364	5	
11	Meralco Bolts	3	8	.273	6	
12	Blackwater Elite	2	9	.182	7	

Source: PBA.ph
Rules for classification: 1) winning percentage; 2) if two teams are tied, head-to-head record; if three or more teams are tied, head-to-head goal average (quotient), if tied for 8th, one-game playoff; 3) overall quotient 4) coin toss

==== Game log ====
2019 PBA Philippine Cup game log
Total: 3–8
January: 2–2

Game	Date	Opponent	Score	High points	High rebounds	High assists	Location Attendance	Record
1	January 16	Phoenix	L 92–93 (OT)	Nico Salva (22)	Cliff Hodge (9)	Cliff Hodge (5)	Smart Araneta Coliseum	0–1
2	January 19	Blackwater	W 99–94	Trevis Jackson (19)	Cliff Hodge (10)	Chris Newsome (7)	Ynares Center	1–1
3	January 25	San Miguel	L 93–105	John Pinto (13)	Cliff Hodge (9)	John Pinto (5)	Ynares Center	1–2
4	January 30	TNT	W 88–77	Chris Newsome (20)	Cliff Hodge (13)	Dillinger, Newsome (5)	Cuneta Astrodome	2–2

February: 0–2

Game	Date	Opponent	Score	High points	High rebounds	High assists	Location Attendance	Record
5	February 2	NLEX	L 83–87	Jared Dillinger (16)	Cliff Hodge (17)	Hodge, Newsome (4)	Ynares Center	2–3
6	February 27	Columbian	L 85–86	Chris Newsome (17)	Hodge, Salva (9)	Amer, Hodge (6)	Smart Araneta Coliseum	2–4

March: 1–4

Game	Date	Opponent	Score	High points	High rebounds	High assists	Location Attendance	Record
7	March 2	Magnolia	L 86–92	Chris Newsome (22)	Ranidel de Ocampo (8)	Chris Newsome (7)	Xavier University Gym	2–5
8	March 8	NorthPort	W 126–123 (2OT)	Chris Newsome (28)	Chris Newsome (12)	Ranidel de Ocampo (8)	Smart Araneta Coliseum	3–5
9	March 15	Rain or Shine	L 85–88	Nico Salva (18)	Chris Newsome (11)	Chris Newsome (6)	Cuneta Astrodome	3–6
10	March 20	Alaska	L 77–92	Nico Salva (23)	Chris Newsome (9)	Canaleta, Hodge (4)	Smart Araneta Coliseum	3–7
11	March 27	Barangay Ginebra	L 76–86	Trevis Jackson (18)	Ranidel de Ocampo (11)	Jackson, Newsome (4)	Smart Araneta Coliseum	3–8

== Commissioner's Cup ==
=== Eliminations ===
==== Standings ====
Pos	Team	W	L	PCT	GB	Qualification
1	TNT KaTropa	10	1	.909	—	Twice-to-beat in the quarterfinals
2	NorthPort Batang Pier	9	2	.818	1	Twice-to-beat in the quarterfinals
3	Blackwater Elite	7	4	.636 (Note: Head-to-head record: Blackwater 1–0 Barangay Ginebra)	3	Best-of-three quarterfinals
4	Barangay Ginebra San Miguel	7	4	.636	3	Best-of-three quarterfinals
5	Magnolia Hotshots Pambansang Manok	5	6	.455 (Note: Head-to-head quotient: Magnolia 1.19, Rain or Shine 1.01, San Miguel 0.83)	5	Best-of-three quarterfinals
6	Rain or Shine Elasto Painters	5	6	.455	5	Best-of-three quarterfinals
7	San Miguel Beermen	5	6	.455	5	Twice-to-win in the quarterfinals
8	Alaska Aces	4	7	.364 (Note: Head-to-head quotient: Alaska 1.012, Meralco 1.011, Phoenix 0.977; 8th-seed playoff: Alaska 108–103 Meralco)	6	Twice-to-win in the quarterfinals
9	Meralco Bolts	4	7	.364	6	
10	Phoenix Pulse Fuel Masters	4	7	.364	6	
11	Columbian Dyip	3	8	.273 (Note: Head-to-head record: Columbian 1–0 NLEX)	7	
12	NLEX Road Warriors	3	8	.273	7	

Source: PBA.ph
Rules for classification: 1) winning percentage; 2) if two teams are tied, head-to-head record; if three or more teams are tied, head-to-head goal average (quotient), if tied for 8th, one-game playoff; 3) overall quotient 4) coin toss

==== Game log ====
2019 PBA Commissioner's Cup game log
Total: 4–7
May: 2–2

Game	Date	Opponent	Score	High points	High rebounds	High assists	Location Attendance	Record
1	May 19	Blackwater	L 91–94 (OT)	Gani Lawal (34)	Gani Lawal (21)	Ranidel de Ocampo (5)	Mall of Asia Arena	0–1
2	May 24	Columbian	W 101–92	Gani Lawal (25)	Gani Lawal (27)	Jackson, Newsome (4)	Smart Araneta Coliseum	1–1
3	May 26	Barangay Ginebra	L 95–110	Gani Lawal (38)	Gani Lawal (20)	Amer, Hugnatan (5)	Smart Araneta Coliseum	1–2
4	May 31	Rain or Shine	W 91–84	Gani Lawal (19)	Gani Lawal (12)	Anjo Caram (6)	Mall of Asia Arena	2–2

June: 1–4

Game	Date	Opponent	Score	High points	High rebounds	High assists	Location Attendance	Record
5	June 7	Phoenix	W 101–95	Gani Lawal (28)	Gani Lawal (26)	Chris Newsome (6)	Smart Araneta Coliseum	3–2
6	June 9	Alaska	L 89–93	Gani Lawal (27)	Gani Lawal (26)	Baser Amer (4)	Ynares Center	3–3
7	June 9	TNT	L 91–104	Chris Newsome (32)	Jimmie Taylor (18)	Chris Newsome (5)	Smart Araneta Coliseum	3–4
8	June 19	NLEX	L 91–100	Gani Lawal (15)	Gani Lawal (14)	Baser Amer (4)	Mall of Asia Arena	3–5
9	June 29	Magnolia	L 88–99	Delroy James (35)	Delroy James (10)	James, Tolomia (4)	Mayor Vitaliano D. Agan Coliseum	3–6

July: 1–1

Game	Date	Opponent	Score	High points	High rebounds	High assists	Location Attendance	Record
10	June 12	NorthPort	L 92–93	Chris Newsome (21)	Cliff Hodge (12)	Delroy James (10)	Cuneta Astrodome	3–7
11	June 17	San Miguel	W 95–91	Delroy James (34)	Almazan, Hodge, Quinto (7)	Delroy James (6)	Smart Araneta Coliseum	4–7

=== Playoffs ===
==== Bracket ====
Quarterfinals
(#1 twice-to-beat)
1	TNT	72	104
8	Alaska	108	93
(Best-of-3)
4	Barangay Ginebra	2
5	Magnolia	0
(#2 twice-to-beat)
2	NorthPort	84	88
7	San Miguel	98	90
(Best-of-3)
3	Blackwater	1
6	Rain or Shine	2

Semifinals (Best-of-5)
1	TNT	3
4	Barangay Ginebra	1
7	San Miguel	3
6	Rain or Shine	1

Finals (Best-of-7)
1	TNT	2
7	San Miguel	4

== Governors' Cup ==
=== Eliminations ===
==== Standings ====
Pos	Team	W	L	PCT	GB	Qualification
1	NLEX Road Warriors	8	3	.727 (Note: Head-to-head quotient: NLEX 1.090, Meralco 0.959, TNT 0.958)	—	Twice-to-beat in quarterfinals
2	Meralco Bolts	8	3	.727	—	Twice-to-beat in quarterfinals
3	TNT KaTropa	8	3	.727	—	Twice-to-beat in quarterfinals
4	Barangay Ginebra San Miguel	7	4	.636	1	Twice-to-beat in quarterfinals
5	San Miguel Beermen	6	5	.545 (Note: Head-to-head record: San Miguel 1–0 Magnolia)	2	Twice-to-win in quarterfinals
6	Magnolia Hotshots Pambansang Manok	6	5	.545	2	Twice-to-win in quarterfinals
7	Alaska Aces	5	6	.455 (Note: Head-to-head record: Alaska 1–0 NorthPort)	3	Twice-to-win in quarterfinals
8	NorthPort Batang Pier	5	6	.455	3	Twice-to-win in quarterfinals
9	Rain or Shine Elasto Painters	4	7	.364 (Note: Head-to-head record: Rain or Shine 1–0 Columbian)	4	
10	Columbian Dyip	4	7	.364	4	
11	Phoenix Pulse Fuel Masters	3	8	.273	5	
12	Blackwater Elite	2	9	.182	6	

Source: PBA.ph
Rules for classification: 1) winning percentage; 2) if two teams are tied, head to head record; if three or more teams are tied, head-to-head goal average (quotient), if tied for 8th, one-game playoff; 3) overall quotient 4) coin toss>

==== Bracket ====
Quarterfinals (Top 4 twice-to-beat)
1	NLEX	90	123
8	NorthPort	115	126***
4	Barangay Ginebra	100
5	San Miguel	97
2	Meralco	94
7	Alaska	84
3	TNT	98
6	Magnolia	97

Semifinals (Best-of-5)
8	NorthPort	1
4	Barangay Ginebra	3
2	Meralco	3
3	TNT	2

Finals (Best-of-7)
4	Barangay Ginebra	4
2	Meralco	1

***Game went into triple overtime

== Transactions ==
=== Trades ===
==== Preseason ====
January
January 12, 2019	To Meralco John Pinto	To Phoenix Jason Ballesteros; 2020 second round pick

January 15, 2019
January 15, 2019	To Meralco 2020 second round pick	To NorthPort Garvo Lanete
