= 2019 Blackwater Elite season =

- Head coach: Bong Ramos; Aries Dimaunahan (starting April 4, 2019); Nash Racela (starting November 27, 2019)
- Owners: Ever Bilena Cosmetics, Inc.

Philippine Cup results
- Record: 2–9 (18.2%)
- Place: 12th
- Playoff finish: Did not qualify

Commissioner's Cup results
- Record: 7–4 (63.6%)
- Place: 3rd
- Playoff finish: Quarterfinalist (lost to Rain or Shine, 1–2)

Governors' Cup results
- Record: 2–9 (18.2%)
- Place: 12th
- Playoff finish: Did not qualify

Blackwater Elite seasons

The 2019 Blackwater Elite season was the 5th season of the franchise in the Philippine Basketball Association (PBA).

== Key dates ==
=== 2018 ===
- December 16: The 2018 PBA draft took place in Midtown Atrium, Robinson Place Manila.

== Draft picks ==
Round	Pick	Player	Position	Nationality	PBA D-League team	College
1	2	Bobby Ray Parks Jr.	G	Philippines	NU-Banco De Oro; Hapee Fresh Fighters	National U
3	24	Diego Dario	G	Philippines	AMA	Philippines
4	34	Dan Alberto	G	Philippines	AMA	UE
5	42	Chris de la Peña	C	Philippines	Batangas-EAC	Letran

== Roster ==
2019 Blackwater Elite roster
Players
Coaches

Pos.	#	POB	Name	Height	Weight	DOB (YYYY–MM–DD)	From
G	0	(United States)	Mike Cortez (C)	6 ft 0 in (1.83 m)	170 lb (77 kg)	1980–10–11	De La Salle
G	1	(Philippines)	Mike Tolomia	5 ft 11 in (1.80 m)	170 lb (77 kg)	1993–01–06	Far Eastern
G	4	(Philippines)	Gelo Alolino	6 ft 0 in (1.83 m)	185 lb (84 kg)	1994–01–04	National-U
G	5	(Philippines)	Diego Dario	5 ft 8 in (1.73 m)	145 lb (66 kg)	1997–01–06	UP Diliman
G	6	(Philippines)	Roi Sumang	5 ft 8 in (1.73 m)	155 lb (70 kg)	1990–12–12	UE
F	7	(Philippines)	Don Trollano	6 ft 3 in (1.91 m)	182 lb (83 kg)	1992–01–07	Adamson
F	9	(Philippines)	KG Canaleta	6 ft 6 in (1.98 m)	200 lb (91 kg)	1982–02–12	UE
F	12	(Philippines)	Mac Belo	6 ft 4 in (1.93 m)	185 lb (84 kg)	1993–02–12	Far Eastern
G	13	(Philippines)	Brian Heruela	5 ft 10 in (1.78 m)	195 lb (88 kg)	1989–04–13	Cebu
F	15	(Philippines)	James Sena	6 ft 5 in (1.96 m)	225 lb (102 kg)	1988–08–31	José Rizal
G	18	(Philippines)	Paul Desiderio	5 ft 10 in (1.78 m)	150 lb (68 kg)	1997–02–02	UP Diliman
C	19	(Philippines)	Rabeh Al-Hussaini	6 ft 7 in (2.01 m)	220 lb (100 kg)	1988–08–11	Ateneo
F	21	(Philippines)	Carl Bryan Cruz	6 ft 4 in (1.93 m)	200 lb (91 kg)	1991–08–21	Far Eastern
F/C	28	(Philippines)	Chris Javier	6 ft 4 in (1.93 m)	200 lb (91 kg)	1992–12–06	UE
F	35	(United States)	Matt Salem	6 ft 3 in (1.91 m)		1993–05–12	National-U
F	88	(Hong Kong)	Joseph Eriobu (IN)	6 ft 4 in (1.93 m)	205 lb (93 kg)	1992–02–12	Mapúa
F	–	(Australia)	Anthony Semerad (injured)	6 ft 4 in (1.93 m)	220 lb (100 kg)	1991–04–25	San Beda

Head coach

- (Philippines) Nash Racela

Assistant coach(es)

- (Philippines) Rommel Adducul (1st assistant)
- (Philippines) Aries Dimaunahan
- (Philippines) Bogs Adornado
- (Philippines) Patrick Aquino
- (Philippines) Junjie Ablan
- (Philippines) Tylon Darjuan
- (Philippines) Gilbert Lao

Team manager

- (Philippines) Joel Co
- (Philippines) Jacob Muñez (assistant)

Legend

- (C) Team captain
- (CI) Commissioner's Cup Import
- (GI) Governors' Cup Import
- (EI) EASL Import
- (DP) Unsigned draft pick
- (FA) Free agent
- (IN) Inactive
- (S) Suspended
- (R) Rookie
- Injured

Roster

== Philippine Cup ==
=== Eliminations ===
==== Standings ====
Pos	Team	W	L	PCT	GB	Qualification
1	Phoenix Pulse Fuel Masters	9	2	.818	—	Twice-to-beat in the quarterfinals
2	Rain or Shine Elasto Painters	8	3	.727	1	Twice-to-beat in the quarterfinals
3	Barangay Ginebra San Miguel	7	4	.636 (Note: Head-to-head quotient: Barangay Ginebra 1.02, TNT 1.00, San Miguel 0.98)	2	Best-of-three quarterfinals
4	TNT KaTropa	7	4	.636	2	Best-of-three quarterfinals
5	San Miguel Beermen	7	4	.636	2	Best-of-three quarterfinals
6	Magnolia Hotshots Pambansang Manok	6	5	.545	3	Best-of-three quarterfinals
7	NorthPort Batang Pier	5	6	.455	4	Twice-to-win in the quarterfinals
8	Alaska Aces	4	7	.364 (Note: Head-to-head quotient: NLEX 1.19, Alaska 1.01, Columbian 0.84; 8th-seed playoff: Alaska 88–80 NLEX)	5	Twice-to-win in the quarterfinals
9	NLEX Road Warriors	4	7	.364	5	
10	Columbian Dyip	4	7	.364	5	
11	Meralco Bolts	3	8	.273	6	
12	Blackwater Elite	2	9	.182	7	

Source: PBA.ph
Rules for classification: 1) winning percentage; 2) if two teams are tied, head-to-head record; if three or more teams are tied, head-to-head goal average (quotient), if tied for 8th, one-game playoff; 3) overall quotient 4) coin toss

==== Game log ====
2019 PBA Philippine Cup game log
Total: 2–9
January: 1–2

Game	Date	Opponent	Score	High points	High rebounds	High assists	Location Attendance	Record
1	January 16	NorthPort	L 91–117	Abu Tratter (18)	Abu Tratter (9)	Belo, Sumang (4)	Smart Araneta Coliseum	0–1
2	January 19	Meralco	L 94–99	Allein Maliksi (17)	Raymar Jose (10)	Roi Sumang (9)	Ynares Center	0–2
3	January 30	Rain or Shine	W 111–99	Michael DiGregorio (27)	Chris Javier (13)	Roi Sumang (8)	Cuneta Astrodome	1–2

February : 0–4

Game	Date	Opponent	Score	High points	High rebounds	High assists	Location Attendance	Record
4	February 1	Phoenix	L 95–114	Abu Tratter (24)	Mac Belo (9)	Belo, Dario (4)	Ynares Center	1–3
5	February 6	San Miguel	L 79–93	Roi Sumang (17)	Maliksi, Tratter (12)	Roi Sumang (6)	Mall of Asia Arena	1–4
6	February 9	Barangay Ginebra	L 67–85	DiGregorio, Eriobu (14)	Eriobu, Javier (8)	Alolino, Belo, Desiderio, Sumang (3)	Davao del Sur Coliseum	1–5
7	February 13	Alaska	L 101–103	Allein Maliksi (25)	Jose, Maliksi (5)	Roi Sumang (5)	Mall of Asia Arena	1–6

March : 1–3

Game	Date	Opponent	Score	High points	High rebounds	High assists	Location Attendance	Record
8	March 1	Columbian	W 106–100	Allein Maliksi (29)	Mac Belo (9)	Maliksi, Sumang (5)	Mall of Asia Arena	2–6
9	March 9	TNT	L 89–127	Michael DiGregorio (20)	Rabeh Al-Hussaini (6)	Maliksi, Sumang (4)	Ynares Center	2–7
10	March 17	NLEX	L 101–122	Allein Maliksi (20)	Abu Tratter (12)	Diego Dario (9)	Smart Araneta Coliseum	2–8
11	March 22	Magnolia	L 87–97	Belo, Maliksi (16)	Abu Tratter (9)	Banal, Dario (4)	Ynares Center	2–9

== Commissioner's Cup ==
=== Eliminations ===
==== Standings ====
Pos	Team	W	L	PCT	GB	Qualification
1	TNT KaTropa	10	1	.909	—	Twice-to-beat in the quarterfinals
2	NorthPort Batang Pier	9	2	.818	1	Twice-to-beat in the quarterfinals
3	Blackwater Elite	7	4	.636 (Note: Head-to-head record: Blackwater 1–0 Barangay Ginebra)	3	Best-of-three quarterfinals
4	Barangay Ginebra San Miguel	7	4	.636	3	Best-of-three quarterfinals
5	Magnolia Hotshots Pambansang Manok	5	6	.455 (Note: Head-to-head quotient: Magnolia 1.19, Rain or Shine 1.01, San Miguel 0.83)	5	Best-of-three quarterfinals
6	Rain or Shine Elasto Painters	5	6	.455	5	Best-of-three quarterfinals
7	San Miguel Beermen	5	6	.455	5	Twice-to-win in the quarterfinals
8	Alaska Aces	4	7	.364 (Note: Head-to-head quotient: Alaska 1.012, Meralco 1.011, Phoenix 0.977; 8th-seed playoff: Alaska 108–103 Meralco)	6	Twice-to-win in the quarterfinals
9	Meralco Bolts	4	7	.364	6	
10	Phoenix Pulse Fuel Masters	4	7	.364	6	
11	Columbian Dyip	3	8	.273 (Note: Head-to-head record: Columbian 1–0 NLEX)	7	
12	NLEX Road Warriors	3	8	.273	7	

Source: PBA.ph
Rules for classification: 1) winning percentage; 2) if two teams are tied, head-to-head record; if three or more teams are tied, head-to-head goal average (quotient), if tied for 8th, one-game playoff; 3) overall quotient 4) coin toss

==== Game log ====
2019 PBA Commissioner's Cup game log
Total: 7–4
May: 3–1

Game	Date	Opponent	Score	High points	High rebounds	High assists	Location Attendance	Record
1	May 19	Meralco	W 94–91 (OT)	DiGregorio, Stepheson (21)	Alex Stepheson (31)	Roi Sumang (3)	Mall of Asia Arena	1–0
2	May 24	Barangay Ginebra	W 108–107 (OT)	Parks, Stepheson (28)	Alex Stepheson (25)	Roi Sumang (7)	Smart Araneta Coliseum	2–0
3	May 26	Columbian	W 118–110	Alex Stepheson (26)	Alex Stepheson (21)	Bobby Ray Parks Jr. (5)	Smart Araneta Coliseum	3–0
4	May 31	Phoenix	L 98–103	Bobby Ray Parks Jr. (25)	Alex Stepheson (18)	Mac Belo (4)	Mall of Asia Arena	3–1

June : 2–2

Game	Date	Opponent	Score	High points	High rebounds	High assists	Location Attendance	Record
5	June 2	Rain or Shine	W 98–92	Allein Maliksi (19)	Alex Stepheson (20)	Roi Sumang (7)	Ynares Center	4–1
6	June 8	NLEX	W 132–106	Bobby Ray Parks Jr. (29)	Alex Stepheson (17)	Parks, Stepheson (5)	Ynares Center	5–1
7	June 14	San Miguel	L 106–127	Bobby Ray Parks Jr. (23)	Bobby Ray Parks Jr. (13)	Roi Sumang (5)	Mall of Asia Arena	5–2
8	June 22	NorthPort	L 99–127	Bobby Ray Parks Jr. (25)	Bobby Ray Parks Jr. (11)	Michael DiGregorio (10)	Cuneta Astrodome	5–3

July : 2–1

Game	Date	Opponent	Score	High points	High rebounds	High assists	Location Attendance	Record
9	July 5	Magnolia	W 104–99 (OT)	Roi Sumang (19)	Staphon Blair (14)	Roi Sumang (6)	Mall of Asia Arena	6–3
10	July 7	TNT	L 97–115	Bobby Ray Parks Jr. (21)	Staphon Blair (16)	Bobby Ray Parks Jr. (5)	Smart Araneta Coliseum	6–4
11	July 14	Alaska	W 112–104	Bobby Ray Parks Jr. (25)	Blair, Parks (10)	Bobby Ray Parks Jr. (8)	Smart Araneta Coliseum	7–4

=== Playoffs ===
==== Bracket ====
Quarterfinals
(#1 twice-to-beat)
1	TNT	72	104
8	Alaska	108	93
(Best-of-3)
4	Barangay Ginebra	2
5	Magnolia	0
(#2 twice-to-beat)
2	NorthPort	84	88
7	San Miguel	98	90
(Best-of-3)
3	Blackwater	1
6	Rain or Shine	2

Semifinals (Best-of-5)
1	TNT	3
4	Barangay Ginebra	1
7	San Miguel	3
6	Rain or Shine	1

Finals (Best-of-7)
1	TNT	2
7	San Miguel	4

==== Game log ====
2019 PBA Commissioner's Cup playoffs game log
Total: 1–2
Quarterfinals: 1–2

Game	Date	Opponent	Score	High points	High rebounds	High assists	Location Attendance	Series
1	July 20	Rain or Shine	L 80–83	Bobby Ray Parks Jr. (20)	Greg Smith (19)	Roi Sumang (7)	Mall of Asia Arena	0–1
2	July 23	Rain or Shine	W 100–96	Greg Smith (31)	Greg Smith (18)	Allein Maliksi (4)	Smart Araneta Coliseum	1–1
3	July 25	Rain or Shine	L 83–85	Belo, Parks (16)	Greg Smith (18)	Roi Sumang (5)	Smart Araneta Coliseum	1–2

== Governors' Cup ==
=== Eliminations ===
==== Standings ====
Pos	Team	W	L	PCT	GB	Qualification
1	NLEX Road Warriors	8	3	.727 (Note: Head-to-head quotient: NLEX 1.090, Meralco 0.959, TNT 0.958)	—	Twice-to-beat in quarterfinals
2	Meralco Bolts	8	3	.727	—	Twice-to-beat in quarterfinals
3	TNT KaTropa	8	3	.727	—	Twice-to-beat in quarterfinals
4	Barangay Ginebra San Miguel	7	4	.636	1	Twice-to-beat in quarterfinals
5	San Miguel Beermen	6	5	.545 (Note: Head-to-head record: San Miguel 1–0 Magnolia)	2	Twice-to-win in quarterfinals
6	Magnolia Hotshots Pambansang Manok	6	5	.545	2	Twice-to-win in quarterfinals
7	Alaska Aces	5	6	.455 (Note: Head-to-head record: Alaska 1–0 NorthPort)	3	Twice-to-win in quarterfinals
8	NorthPort Batang Pier	5	6	.455	3	Twice-to-win in quarterfinals
9	Rain or Shine Elasto Painters	4	7	.364 (Note: Head-to-head record: Rain or Shine 1–0 Columbian)	4	
10	Columbian Dyip	4	7	.364	4	
11	Phoenix Pulse Fuel Masters	3	8	.273	5	
12	Blackwater Elite	2	9	.182	6	

Source: PBA.ph
Rules for classification: 1) winning percentage; 2) if two teams are tied, head to head record; if three or more teams are tied, head-to-head goal average (quotient), if tied for 8th, one-game playoff; 3) overall quotient 4) coin toss>

== Transactions ==
=== Free agency ===
Player	Date signed	Contract amount	Contract length	Former team
Gelo Alolino	January 8, 2019	Not disclosed	1 year	Phoenix
Matt Salem	January 13, 2019	Not disclosed	1 year	Barangay Ginebra

=== Trades ===
==== Preseason ====
December
December 19, 2018	To Blackwater Elite 2021 & 2022 second round picks	To San Miguel Paul Zamar

December 28, 2018	To Blackwater Abu Tratter (from NLEX); Paul Desiderio (from NLEX); Alfrancis Tamsi (from TNT); 2022 second round pick (from TNT)	To NLEX John Paul Erram (from Blackwater); Philip Paredes (from TNT)	To TNT Michael Miranda (from NLEX); 2022 second round pick (from San Miguel via Blackwater)

January
January 7, 2019	To Blackwater Elite John Pinto	To Phoenix Fuel Masters Joseph Eriobu

==== Governors' Cup ====
September
September 6, 2019	To Blackwater Elite Carl Bryan Cruz	To Meralco Bolts Abu Tratter

October
October 19, 2019	To Blackwater Elite Brian Heruela	To TNT KaTropa Mike DiGregorio

November
November 3, 2019	To Blackwater Elite Don TrollanoAnthony SemeradSeason 47 draft pick	To TNT KaTropa Bobby Ray Parks Jr.

December
December 19, 2019	To Blackwater Elite Mike Tolomia; Niño Canaleta; 2020 2nd round pick Season 48 2nd round pick	To Meralco Bolts Allein Maliksi; Raymar Jose
