= Allein Maliksi =

Filipino basketball player (born 1987)

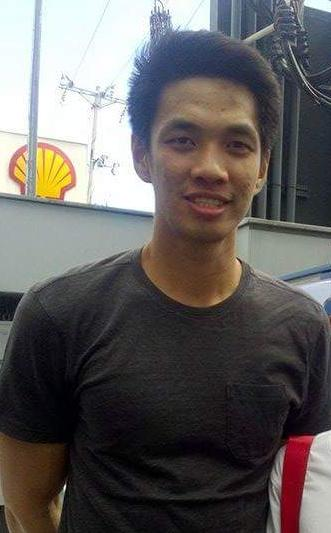
- Maliksi in 2016

No. 22 – Meralco Bolts
- Position: Small forward / shooting guard
- League: PBA

Personal information
- Born: September 18, 1987 (age 39) Makati, Philippines
- Listed height: 6 ft 4 in (1.93 m)
- Listed weight: 180 lb (82 kg)

Career information
- High school: Camarin High School (Caloocan)
- College: University of Manila; UST
- PBA draft: 2011: 1st round, 8th overall pick
- Drafted by: Petron Blaze Boosters
- Playing career: 2011–present

Career history
- 2011: Barako Bull Energy
- 2011–2013: Barangay Ginebra Kings / Barangay Ginebra San Miguel
- 2013: Barako Bull Energy Cola
- 2013–2017: San Mig Coffee Mixers / San Mig Super Coffee Mixers / Purefoods Star Hotshots / Star Hotshots
- 2017–2019: Blackwater Elite
- 2019–present: Meralco Bolts

Career highlights
- 5× PBA champion (2013 Governors', 2013–14 Philippine, 2014 Commissioner's, 2014 Governors', 2024 Philippine); 2× PBA All-Star (2017, 2018); PBA Three-Point Shootout champion (2017); PBA Mr. Quality Minutes (2021); PBA D-League MVP (2011 Foundation Cup); NAASCU champion (2005); UAAP NCAA All-Star Game Three Point Shootout champion

Allein Gail Q. Maliksi (born September 18, 1987) is a Filipino professional basketball player for the Meralco Bolts of the Philippine Basketball Association (PBA). He was drafted 8th by the Petron Blaze Boosters in the 2011 PBA draft. A two-time PBA All-Star, he has won five PBA titles and has also represented the Philippines in international competitions.

== Early life ==
Maliksi grew up poor, living in a shanty right next to La Loma Cemetery. His mother didn't have a job, while his father was a tricycle driver. When he was six years old, their home was demolished to make way for the construction of the C-3 highway. The family relocated to the home of his maternal grandmother.

In high school, Maliksi studied at Camarin High School, where he became a Citizenship Advancement Training (CAT) officer, a step towards becoming a police officer. He tried out for his high school's basketball team, but didn't make the team.

== College career ==
Maliksi first enrolled at the University of Manila (UM), taking a criminology course. He played basketball at first only during intramurals. His performance there led him to try out for the university's basketball team, this time making the team. He played under coach Ato Tolentino as a bench player for two NAASCU seasons, during which they won all but one of 94 games, including a title in 2005. He also trained with Wang's Basketball, a commercial team headed by former PBA players such as Vergel Meneses, Noli Locsin, and Manny Victorino.

To boost his chances of getting drafted into the PBA, Maliksi then transferred and played for the UST Growling Tigers after undergoing residency for a year. However, before making his official debut, he tore his ACL in a tuneup game. The recovery process took five months, but he then re-tore his ACL in practice. This time, the recovery lasted eight months. He was only able to play one full season in the UAAP.

== Amateur career ==
Maliksi first played for the RP Patriots in the ABL in 2010, where he was a bench player. He then played with the Cebuana Lhuillier Gems in the PBA D-League. He became the D-League's first-ever MVP in the 2011 Foundation Cup where he led the Gems to the finals before losing to the NLEX Road Warriors.

After his PBA D-League stint, he then played for the M. Lhuillier Kwarta Padala-Cebu Niños in Liga Pilipinas. He then applied for the 2011 PBA draft.

== Professional career ==
=== Barako Bull Energy ===
On August 28, 2011, Maliksi was drafted eight overall in the 2011 PBA draft by the Petron Blaze Boosters, but was traded on draft day to the Barako Bull Energy. He was given a two-year deal.

=== Barangay Ginebra ===
In November 2011, just around three months after being drafted, Maliksi was traded by Barako Bull to Barangay Ginebra Kings in a three-team trade that also involved B-Meg Llamados.

=== Return to Barako ===
On January 22, 2013, Maliksi was traded by Ginebra back to Barako Bull in a five-team, ten-player trade.

=== Star franchise ===
==== 2013–14: ACL tear and Grand Slam ====
On August 16, 2013, the PBA approved a trade that sent him to the Star Hotshots in exchange of a 2017 second-round pick, Wesley Gonzales and Chris Pacana. He became the team's main scorer off the bench, averaging 10.9 points and 2.7 rebounds in only 20 minutes in his first 10 games with the team. On September 27, 2013, in a do-or-die quarterfinals matchup against the Alaska Aces, he suffered a partial ACL tear that would sideline him for 6 months.

In his absence, the team won three straight championships, and were going for a grand slam. Maliksi returned for the last conference needed for the grand slam, the 2014 Governors' Cup. He officially made his return in a win over Barako, contributing eight points. The team went on to complete the grand slam by beating the Rain or Shine Elasto Painters in the Governors' Cup finals.

==== 2015–17: Breakout years ====
In the 2015–16 Philippine Cup, Maliksi averaged 7.7 minutes a game. He posted on Instagram a t-shirt that said "play me or trade me". He apologized to head coach Jason Webb and to Star's management and was suspended indefinitely for four months.

During the 2016 Commissioner's Cup, Maliksi made his return from his suspension with 23 points in 26 minutes off the bench. He then scored 29 points, his career-high at the time, along with six rebounds in a win over TNT. He did it by making all six of his triples, tying the most triples made in a PBA game without a miss. This earned him his first-ever Player of the Week citation.

Following the departure of Star's main man James Yap to the Rain or Shine Elasto Painters during the 2016–17 PBA season, Maliksi was given more minutes under new coach Chito Victolero. On January 28, 2017, he led Star with 25 points in a lopsided 47-point win against the Meralco Bolts, making him named as Player of The Week. He then set his career-high 33 points the following game in a 124–87 victory against the Mahindra Enforcer, hitting 7-out-of-8 in the three-point line. These performances earned him his second Player of the Week citation. He also won the three-point shootout that season during All-Star week.

=== Blackwater Elite ===
On September 10, 2017, Maliksi, along with Chris Javier, was traded to the Blackwater Elite for Kyle Pascual and Riego Gamalinda. In his Blackwater debut, he scored 22 points and helped Blackwater make the 2017 Governors' Cup playoffs. As the eighth seed, they lost to the first seed Meralco Bolts in two games.

In the offseason, Maliksi re-signed with Blackwater for a max contract of close to P10,000,000 for two years. In the Philippine Cup, they finished in a four-way tie for eighth, but due to an inferior quotient, they did not make the playoffs. They did not make the Commissioner's Cup playoffs as well, but finished fifth in the Governors' Cup.

For most of the 2019 season, Maliksi was consistent in his scoring, averaging 16.5 points in the Philippine Cup and 14 points in the Commissioner's Cup. However, during the Governors' Cup, his scoring average dropped to just nine points as Blackwater dropped to 11th place that conference.

=== Meralco Bolts ===
On October 25, 2019, Maliksi, along with Raymar Jose, was traded to the Meralco Bolts for Mike Tolomia, KG Canaleta, and two second-round draft picks in 2020 and 2022. He made his debut for Meralco with 12 points in a win over the San Miguel Beermen. With Meralco, he was able to make his return to the PBA finals during the Governors' Cup, his first finals appearance since his time at Star.

In the offseason, Meralco re-signed him to a one-year deal. With him, Meralco made its first Philippine Cup semifinals appearance in 2020. This led to him getting another deal with Meralco. In the 2021 Philippine Cup, Meralco made the semifinals once again, but he missed a game due to a fractured cheekbone. In a win over the Phoenix Super LPG Fuel Masters during the Governors' Cup, he scored 27 points in less than 27 minutes off the bench. Meralco then made the 2021 Governors' Cup finals. During the finals, he averaged 13.2 points on 41.5% shooting from three and 81% shooting from the free throw line. For the season, he was awarded as the league's Mr. Quality Minutes.

During the 2023 Governors' Cup, Maliksi scored 30 points in a win over Blackwater. Later in the conference, while playing against the Converge FiberXers, he got fouled by Barkley Eboña. Thinking Eboña was going for his head, he charged at him and appeared to be trying to put him in a chokehold, which led to his ejection. He was then suspended for one game and fined P75,000.

In a win over Blackwater during the 2023–24 Commissioner's Cup, Maliksi fractured his nose. He missed three weeks due to the injury. In the Philippine Cup, Meralco made the finals against the Beermen. During Game 3, he and the Beermen's Jeron Teng got into an altercation that led to both of them receiving technical fouls. From Games 2 to 4, he had been struggling with his shooting, averaging just 8.3 points. In Game 5, he scored 22 points, bringing Meralco to one win away from the title. In Game 6, he contributed 14 points as he and Chris Newsome led Meralco to its first PBA title. This was his fifth title and first since leaving the Star franchise.

During the 2024–25 season, Maliksi spent time on Meralco's injury list due to knee surgery. He was deemed out for the season after suffering from sciatica.

== National team career ==
In 2017, Maliksi was called up to the Philippines men's national basketball team pool after his teammate at Star, Paul Lee, got injured. He went on to make the team for that year's SEABA Championship. When playing, his last name on his jersey is "Malicsi", due to a misspelling on his old birth certificate. The Philippines was able to win that tournament. He was considered for the 2017 FIBA Asia Cup, but his teammate Jio Jalalon was chosen instead.

From 2017 to 2018, Maliksi was a bench player for the Philippine team during the qualifying windows for the 2019 FIBA World Cup. In one of the windows, he got involved in the Philippines–Australia basketball brawl. He was one of four Filipino players who were not given sanctions after the brawl.

== Career statistics ==
Legend
| GP | Games played | MPG | Minutes per game | FG% | Field-goal percentage |
| 3FG% | 3-point field-goal percentage | 4P% | 4-point field-goal percentage | FT% | Free-throw percentage |
| RPG | Rebounds per game | APG | Assists per game | SPG | Steals per game |
| BPG | Blocks per game | PPG | Points per game | 127 | Career high |

=== UAAP ===
| Year | Team | GP | MPG | FG% | 3P% | FT% | RPG | APG | SPG | BPG | PPG |
|---|---|---|---|---|---|---|---|---|---|---|---|
| 2008-09 | UST | 1 | 5 | .333 | 1.000 | — | — | — | 1.0 | — | 3.0 |
| 2009-10 | UST | 12 | 14.3 | .341 | .333 | .800 | 4.3 | .5 | .3 | .2 | 14.3 |
| Career | | 13 | 13.6 | .341 | .355 | .800 | 4.0 | .5 | .4 | .2 | 13.5 |

=== PBA ===
As of the end of 2025–26 season

==== Season-by-season averages ====
| Year | Team | GP | MPG | FG% | 3P% | 4P% | FT% | RPG | APG | SPG | BPG | PPG |
|---|---|---|---|---|---|---|---|---|---|---|---|---|
| 2011–12 | Barako Bull | 19 | 13.8 | .409 | .333 | — | .889 | 2.3 | .1 | .2 | .2 | 6.5 |
| 2011–12 | Barangay Ginebra | 19 | 13.8 | .409 | .333 | — | .889 | 2.3 | .1 | .2 | .2 | 6.5 |
| 2012–13 | Barangay Ginebra | 33 | 23.7 | .386 | .342 | — | .817 | 3.2 | 1.0 | .5 | .1 | 9.0 |
| 2012–13 | Barako Bull | 33 | 23.7 | .386 | .342 | — | .817 | 3.2 | 1.0 | .5 | .1 | 9.0 |
| 2012–13 | San Mig Coffee | 33 | 23.7 | .386 | .342 | — | .817 | 3.2 | 1.0 | .5 | .1 | 9.0 |
| 2013–14 | San Mig Super Coffee | 19 | 12.2 | .429 | .344 | — | .857 | .9 | .4 | .4 | .1 | 5.1 |
| 2014–15 | Purefoods / Star | 37 | 13.6 | .418 | .382 | — | .750 | 2.0 | .6 | .1 | .2 | 6.1 |
| 2015–16 | Star | 33 | 18.9 | .441 | .444 | — | .719 | 2.7 | .5 | .5 | .2 | 9.9 |
| 2016–17 | Star | 46 | 22.4 | .424 | .367 | — | .776 | 3.1 | .9 | .7 | .2 | 13.0 |
| 2016–17 | Blackwater | 46 | 22.4 | .424 | .367 | — | .776 | 3.1 | .9 | .7 | .2 | 13.0 |
| 2017–18 | Blackwater | 32 | 26.2 | .366 | .294 | — | .750 | 5.0 | 1.8 | .7 | .2 | 11.4 |
| 2019 | Blackwater | 47 | 22.6 | .421 | .321 | — | .820 | 3.9 | 1.6 | .7 | .3 | 11.5 |
| 2019 | Meralco | 47 | 22.6 | .421 | .321 | — | .820 | 3.9 | 1.6 | .7 | .3 | 11.5 |
| 2020 | Meralco | 18 | 20.3 | .411 | .411 | — | .784 | 3.3 | 1.2 | .6 | .2 | 11.7 |
| 2021 | Meralco | 42 | 23.2 | .440 | .410 | — | .825 | 3.3 | 1.0 | .5 | .2 | 12.3 |
| 2022–23 | Meralco | 47 | 25.8 | .396 | .371 | — | .822 | 3.6 | 1.3 | .8 | .2 | 12.5 |
| 2023–24 | Meralco | 36 | 22.7 | .431 | .342 | — | .784 | 3.3 | 1.4 | .5 | .3 | 13.3 |
| 2024–25 | Meralco | 2 | 20.6 | .467 | .333 | — | .667 | .5 | 2.5 | — | — | 8.5 |
| 2025–26 | Meralco | 23 | 10.6 | .333 | .375 | .000 | .760 | 1.6 | .4 | .5 | .0 | 4.8 |
| Career | | 434 | 20.7 | .412 | .366 | .000 | .794 | 3.1 | 1.0 | .6 | .2 | 10.4 |

== Personal life ==
Maliksi married Kaye Tan in 2019 at a church ceremony. Ian Sangalang's wife Eunice Yu-Sangalang was the maid of honor, UST teammate Chris Camus was the best man, and James Yap and several of his college teammates were groomsmen. Vergel Meneses was one of his wedding godfathers. They have two children.
