= Chris Javier =

Filipino basketball player

No. 27 – Bataan Risers
- Position: Power forward / center
- League: MPBL

Personal information
- Born: December 6, 1992 (age 33) Biñan, Laguna, Philippines
- Listed height: 6 ft 5 in (1.96 m)
- Listed weight: 200 lb (91 kg)

Career information
- High school: San Beda (Manila)
- College: UE
- PBA draft: 2016: 2nd round, 5th overall pick
- Drafted by: Star Hotshots
- Playing career: 2016–present

Career history
- 2016–2017: Star Hotshots
- 2017–2019: Blackwater Elite
- 2020–2021: TNT Tropang Giga
- 2022: NorthPort Batang Pier
- 2022–2023: Quezon City Beacons
- 2023: San Juan Knights
- 2023–2024: Kyusi / San Pedro Pablo Escobets
- 2024: Bicolandia Oragons
- 2025–present: Bataan Risers

Career highlights
- PBA champion (2021 Philippine)

Christopher Joyce Fernando Javier (born December 6, 1992) is a Filipino professional basketball player for the Bataan Risers of the Maharlika Pilipinas Basketball League (MPBL). He was drafted 5th overall by Star in the 2016 PBA draft.

== Early life ==
The young Javier learned the rudiments of the game of basketball when he participated in a camp held by former PBA player Ed Cordero sometime in 2005. A year later, he was recruited by the San Beda Red Cubs, which he helped win more championships in the high school division of the National Collegiate Athletic Association. When it was time for him to move to college, he planned to enroll at De La Salle University with fellow Red Cub Alfonzo Gotladera but was advised to play elsewhere to avoid playing in the shadow of his teammate.

== Collegiate career ==
Javier played his entire five-year collegiate career for the UE Red Warriors in the University Athletic Association of the Philippines. He posted career averages of 7.1 points and 5.1 rebounds in 22.6 minutes, playing a total of 68 games.

He started turning heads during his sophomore year after averaging 10.6 points and 6.9 rebounds, an improvement from his rookie numbers of 4.6 points and 4.6 rebounds per game. In the same season, he hit back-to-back game winners — first against UP and then against five-peat seeking Ateneo de Manila. In his final season with the team, he averaged 11.2 points (second on the team), and a team-leading 6.6 rebounds and 1.5 blocks. His 1.5 blocks was also the second-highest average in the entire league.

== PBA D-League ==
Javier had an impressive stint with the Racal Tile Masters in the PBA D-League.

== Professional career ==
Javier was drafted fifth overall in the 2016 PBA draft by the Star Hotshots.

On September 10, 2017, Javier, along with Allein Maliksi, was traded to the Blackwater Elite for Kyle Pascual and Riego Gamalinda.

On September 18, 2020, he signed with the TNT KaTropa. He also had a stint with the team's affiliate 3x3 team, the TNT Tropang Giga, during the 2021 PBA 3x3 season.

On June 3, 2022, he signed with the NorthPort Batang Pier. Several months later, he, Renzo Subido, and John Apacible were waived when the team traded for Arvin Tolentino, Jeff Chan, Prince Caperal, and Kent Salado.

After leaving the PBA, he had a stint in the PSL. He then played in the MPBL for the San Juan Knights, Bicolandia Oragons and the Bataan Risers.

== Career statistics ==
Legend
GP	Games played	MPG	Minutes per game
FG%	Field-goal percentage	3P%	3-point field-goal percentage	FT%	Free-throw percentage
RPG	Rebounds per game	APG	Assists per game	SPG	Steals per game
BPG	Blocks per game	PPG	Points per game	**Bold**	Career high

=== PBA season-by-season averages ===
As of the end of 2022–23 season

Year	Team	GP	MPG	FG%	3P%	FT%	RPG	APG	SPG	BPG	PPG
2016–17	Star	16	4.7	.364	.000	.800	.6	.3	.0	**.2**	1.3
2017–18	Blackwater	18	6.0	**.455**	.182	.600	1.0	.3	**.2**	.1	1.9
2019	Blackwater	**20**	**13.1**	.358	**.321**	.708	**2.4**	**.5**	**.2**	**.2**	**4.2**
2021	TNT	8	3.6	.400	.000	**1.000**	.3	.0	.0	.0	.8
2022–23	NorthPort	6	7.8	**.455**	.286	—	1.7	.2	.0	.0	2.0
Career		68	7.7	.388	.245	.722	1.3	.3	.1	.1	2.3

=== College ===
==== Elimination rounds ====
Year	Team	GP	MPG	FG%	3P%	FT%	RPG	APG	SPG	BPG	PPG
2011-12	UE	**14**	20.6	.397	.000	.583	4.6	.6	-	.5	4.6
2012-13	UE	**14**	**29.5**	**.500**	.100	.614	**6.9**	**.9**	**.2**	.4	10.6
2013-14	UE	**14**	17.7	.403	.167	.133	3.5	.4	-	.4	4.5
2014-15	UE	**14**	21.0	.435	.000	.688	4.0	.8	**.2**	.4	6.1
2015-16	UE	13	24.4	**.456**	.000	**.700**	6.6	.8	.1	**1.5**	**11.2**
Career		69	22.6	.425	.182	.581	5.1	.7	.1	.6	7.3

==== Playoffs ====
Year	Team	GP	MPG	FG%	3P%	FT%	RPG	APG	SPG	BPG	PPG
2014-15	UE	1	19.4	.333	.000	.500	3.0	-	-	-	5.0
Career		1	19.4	.333	.000	.500	3.0	-	-	-	5.0

== International career ==
Javier suited up for the Philippine national team that competed in the 2016 FIBA Asia Challenge in Tehran. As a backup big man, he averaged 3.6 points, 0.8 rebounds, and 9.1 minutes in the five games that he played.

== Personal life ==
Javier's father Randy once played for the Adamson Soaring Falcons. Javier also owns an auto shop in his hometown.
