= Diego Dario =

Filipino basketball player (born 1997)

No. 6 – Quezon Huskers
- Position: Point guard
- League: MPBL

Personal information
- Born: January 6, 1997 (age 29) San Juan, Philippines
- Listed height: 5 ft 8 in (1.73 m)
- Listed weight: 145 lb (66 kg)

Career information
- High school: UPIS (Quezon City)
- College: UP (2014–2018)
- PBA draft: 2018: 3rd round, 24th overall pick
- Drafted by: Blackwater Elite
- Playing career: 2019–present

Career history
- 2019–2020: Blackwater Elite
- 2021: Nueva Ecija Rice Vanguards
- 2022: Davao Occidental Tigers
- 2023–2024: Meralco Bolts
- 2025–present: Quezon Huskers

Career highlights
- PBA champion (2024 Philippine)

Diego Miguel Dario (born January 6, 1997) is a Filipino professional basketball player for the Quezon Huskers of the Maharlika Pilipinas Basketball League (MPBL). A high school standout, he has played for the Philippine national under-17 team. He is also a former collegiate star player for the UP Fighting Maroons and has since won a PBA championship with Meralco. He is also an analyst for One Sports.

== Early life and high school career ==
Dario was born in San Juan, Metro Manila. His father taught him basketball at the age of five. He then joined basketball camps and tried out for grade school varsity.

At 5”1, Dario tried out for the varsity team of the University of the Philippines Integrated School (UPIS). He got cut as he was too short. That did not deter him as he did extra work with his father. He patterned his game after the likes of Kyrie Irving and Chris Paul. A change in his diet also helped him grow six more inches.

The following year, Dario made the team. He became one of the scoring leaders of the entire UAAP juniors division, averaging 19.2 points per game while also averaging 4.2 rebounds, 3.6 assists, and 1.2 steals per game. He also got to play in the 2014 NBTC All-Star Game and the SLAM Rising Stars Classic.

== College career ==
=== UP Fighting Maroons ===
After his stint with UPIS, Dario had college offers from other schools, including Ateneo de Manila. He chose to stay with UP's program, as his parents and brother had studied in UP.

Dario missed several games of his rookie season during UAAP Season 77 due to commitments to play in the FIBA U17 World Championship. In his debut, he scored six points off the bench in a lopsided loss to the NU Bulldogs. He then had 10 points in a loss to the FEU Tamaraws. In the final game of the season, he led with 13 points, but they lost to the Adamson Soaring Falcons. With the loss, they only won one game that season.

In Season 78, Dario scored 15 points in a loss to the UST Growling Tigers followed by 10 points in a loss to FEU. Against the Ateneo Blue Eagles, he led with 14 points. They finished the season 3–11, which was still better than its combined record from the past two UAAP seasons.

From Seasons 79 to 80, Dario had less playing time from 17 minutes in his first two seasons to just 11.9. During this time, he got to participate in the UAAP's first ever Three-Point Contest.

In a loss to UST during the first round of eliminations of Season 81, Dario scored 10 points. After the first round, UP had a record of 3–4. After another loss to begin the second round, he, Paul Desiderio, and other graduating players called a seniors-only meeting to discuss improvements, which they then suggested to the coaches. With their suggestions quickly implemented, they also resolved to practice harder. Against UE, he scored eight straight points in the fourth quarter to lead UP to a win, and finished with 13 points. He then missed a game as he got accidentally hit in the neck in practice, and had to be hospitalized. Still, UP made it back to the Final Four for the first time in 21 years. There they beat Adamson for their first finals appearance in 28 years.

== Professional career ==
=== Blackwater Elite ===
Dario applied for the 2018 PBA Draft after UP returned to the UAAP finals. There he was picked in the third round, 24th overall by the Blackwater Elite. He signed with the team for one year. In a loss to the Magnolia Hotshots during the 2019 Philippine Cup, he scored 11 points. His contract was then extended for another year.

On June 11, 2021, Dario was cut from the Elite. Initially, they wanted him for their PBA 3x3 team. However, Blackwater backed out of the tournament. In 17 games played with the Elite, he averaged 2.4 points and 1.5 assists per contest.

=== Nueva Ecija Rice Vanguards ===
After getting cut, Dario stayed in shape by playing for Primus 7A in the amateur tournament 2021 FilBasket Subic Championship. He then joined the Nueva Ecija Rice Vanguards in the 2021 MPBL Invitational. His team made it to the finals, where they lost to Basilan Jumbo Plastic.

=== Davao Occidental Tigers ===
Dario then had a stint with the Davao Occidental Tigers in the PSL.

=== Meralco Bolts ===
In 2022, Dario joined the Meralco Bolts as a practice player. He finally joined the main lineup for the 2023 Governors' Cup. He won his first PBA championship in the 2024 Philippine Cup.

== PBA career statistics ==
Legend
GP	Games played	MPG	Minutes per game
FG%	Field-goal percentage	3P%	3-point field-goal percentage	FT%	Free-throw percentage
RPG	Rebounds per game	APG	Assists per game	SPG	Steals per game
BPG	Blocks per game	PPG	Points per game	**Bold**	Career high

As of the end of 2023–24 season

=== Season-by-season averages ===
Year	Team	GP	MPG	FG%	3P%	FT%	RPG	APG	SPG	BPG	PPG
2019	Blackwater	**17**	8.8	.286	.273	.500	.5	**1.5**	.4	—	2.4
2020	Blackwater	9	5.1	.300	**.364**	.500	.3	.8	—	—	2.0
2022–23	Meralco	2	3.9	**.333**	.333	—	.5	.5	**.5**	—	**2.5**
2023–24	Meralco	15	**9.8**	.275	.214	**.692**	**.6**	1.2	.1	—	**2.5**
Career		43	8.1	.287	.267	.609	.5	1.2	.2	—	2.3

== National team career ==
In 2013, Dario joined the Philippine national under-17 team for the 2013 FIBA Asia U-16 Championship. He also played for them in the FIBA U-17 World Championship.

== Off the court ==
After he was cut from Blackwater in 2021, Dario joined the daily sports show The Game on One Sports, where he guested twice to talk about the ongoing NBA playoffs. He eventually became one of the program's hosts while also being an analyst for PBA and UAAP games. He also wrote articles for NBA.com Philippines. Dario is also a sports marketing consultant for Adidas Philippines.

== Personal life ==
In 2024, Dario got engaged with former UAAP courtside reporter now a sports producer Sam Corrales after seven years of dating.
