= Trevis Jackson =

Filipino-American basketball player

UC Santa Cruz Banana Slugs
- Title: Assistant coach
- League: Coast to Coast Athletic Conference

Personal information
- Born: September 14, 1995 (age 31) Sacramento County, California, U.S.
- Listed height: 5 ft 11 in (1.80 m)
- Listed weight: 170 lb (77 kg)

Career information
- High school: Santa Monica (Santa Monica, California)
- College: Sacramento State (2013–2017)
- NBA draft: 2017: undrafted
- PBA draft: 2018: 1st round, 5th overall pick
- Drafted by: Meralco Bolts
- Playing career: 2019–2022
- Position: Point guard

Career history

Playing
- 2019–2021: Meralco Bolts
- 2021–2022: Rain or Shine Elasto Painters
- 2022: Blackwater Bossing

Coaching
- 2023–present: UC Santa Cruz (assistant)

Trevis Aundrell Tedios Jackson (born September 14, 1995) is a Filipino-American professional basketball coach and former player in the Philippine Basketball Association (PBA). Jackson is currently an assistant coach for the UC Santa Cruz Banana Slugs of the Coast to Coast Athletic Conference.

== Professional career ==
Jackson was drafted fifth overall by the Meralco Bolts during the 2018 PBA draft.

On December 4, 2021, he was traded to the Rain or Shine Elasto Painters for Franky Johnson.

In June 2022 while he was still a free agent, Jackson played 3x3 for Pretty Huge in a regional tournament in Thailand.

On September 20, 2022, Jackson signed with the Blackwater Bossing.

== PBA career statistics ==
Legend
GP	Games played	MPG	Minutes per game
FG%	Field-goal percentage	3P%	3-point field-goal percentage	FT%	Free-throw percentage
RPG	Rebounds per game	APG	Assists per game	SPG	Steals per game
BPG	Blocks per game	PPG	Points per game	**Bold**	Career high

=== Season-by-season averages ===
Year	Team	GP	MPG	FG%	3P%	FT%	RPG	APG	SPG	BPG	PPG
2019	Meralco	**35**	11.0	.375	**.403**	.722	1.1	**1.2**	.3	**.1**	3.7
2020	Meralco	14	8.0	.405	.353	.333	1.2	.7	.1	**.1**	2.6
2021	Meralco	23	10.4	.341	.292	.667	1.1	.7	.2	.0	1.9
2021	Rain or Shine	23	10.4	.341	.292	.667	1.1	.7	.2	.0	1.9
2022–23	Blackwater	12	**20.1**	**.408**	.344	**.800**	**1.8**	**1.2**	**.8**	.0	**6.4**
Career		84	11.6	.382	.364	.700	1.2	1.0	.3	.1	3.4

== Personal life ==
His cousin, DeSean, is an American football wide receiver.
