= 2019 PBA Governors' Cup =

- Duration: September 20, 2019 – January 17, 2020
- TV partner(s): Local: ESPN 5 TV5; PBA Rush (HD); International: AksyonTV International

Finals
- Champions: Barangay Ginebra San Miguel
- Runners-up: Meralco Bolts

Awards
- Best Player: Christian Standhardinger (NorthPort Batang Pier)
- Best Import: Allen Durham (Meralco Bolts)
- Finals MVP: Japeth Aguilar (Barangay Ginebra San Miguel)

PBA Governors' Cup chronology
- < 2018 2021 >

PBA conference chronology
- < 2019 Commissioner's 2020 Philippine >

The 2019 Philippine Basketball Association (PBA) Governors' Cup, also known as the 2019 Honda–PBA Governors' Cup for sponsorship reasons, was the third and final conference of the 2019 PBA season. The tournament allows teams to hire foreign players or imports with a height limit of 6'5".

== Format ==
The tournament format for this conference is as follows:

- Single-round robin eliminations; 11 games per team; Teams are then seeded by basis on win–loss records.
- Top eight teams will advance to the quarterfinals. In case of tie, a playoff game will be held only for the #8 seed.
- Quarterfinals (higher seed with the twice-to-beat advantage):
  - QF1: #1 seed vs #8 seed
  - QF2: #2 seed vs #7 seed
  - QF3: #3 seed vs #6 seed
  - QF4: #4 seed vs #5 seed
- Semifinals (best-of-5 series):
  - SF1: QF1 vs. QF4 winners
  - SF2: QF2 vs. QF3 winners
- Finals (best-of-7 series)
  - Winners of the semifinals

== Elimination round ==
=== Team standings ===
Pos	Team	W	L	PCT	GB	Qualification
1	NLEX Road Warriors	8	3	.727 (Note: Head-to-head quotient: NLEX 1.090, Meralco 0.959, TNT 0.958)	—	Twice-to-beat in quarterfinals
2	Meralco Bolts	8	3	.727	—	Twice-to-beat in quarterfinals
3	TNT KaTropa	8	3	.727	—	Twice-to-beat in quarterfinals
4	Barangay Ginebra San Miguel	7	4	.636	1	Twice-to-beat in quarterfinals
5	San Miguel Beermen	6	5	.545 (Note: Head-to-head record: San Miguel 1–0 Magnolia)	2	Twice-to-win in quarterfinals
6	Magnolia Hotshots Pambansang Manok	6	5	.545	2	Twice-to-win in quarterfinals
7	Alaska Aces	5	6	.455 (Note: Head-to-head record: Alaska 1–0 NorthPort)	3	Twice-to-win in quarterfinals
8	NorthPort Batang Pier	5	6	.455	3	Twice-to-win in quarterfinals
9	Rain or Shine Elasto Painters	4	7	.364 (Note: Head-to-head record: Rain or Shine 1–0 Columbian)	4	
10	Columbian Dyip	4	7	.364	4	
11	Phoenix Pulse Fuel Masters	3	8	.273	5	
12	Blackwater Elite	2	9	.182	6	

Source: PBA.ph
Rules for classification: 1) winning percentage; 2) if two teams are tied, head to head record; if three or more teams are tied, head-to-head goal average (quotient), if tied for 8th, one-game playoff; 3) overall quotient 4) coin toss>

=== Schedule ===
Team ╲ Game	1	2	3	4	5	6	7	8	9	10	11
Alaska	COL	BGSM	SMB	MER	MAG	ROS	TNT	BWE	NP	PHX	NLEX
Barangay Ginebra	ALA	PHX	NLEX	SMB	MAG	ROS	BWE	MER	TNT	COL	NP
Blackwater	TNT	NLEX	NP	COL	MAG	MER	ROS	ALA	BGSM	SMB	PHX
Columbian	ALA	ROS	NP	TNT	BWE	NLEX	SMB	PHX	MAG	MER	BGSM
Magnolia	MER	NP	ROS	ALA	SMB	BWE	BGSM	COL	PHX	NLEX	TNT
Meralco	MAG	NLEX	ALA	PHX	TNT	BWE	SMB	BGSM	COL	NP	ROS
NLEX	PHX	MER	BWE	SMB	BGSM	COL	TNT	ROS	MAG	NP	ALA
NorthPort	ROS	MAG	COL	BWE	TNT	PHX	SMB	ALA	MER	NLEX	BGSM
Phoenix	NLEX	SMB	BGSM	TNT	MER	ROS	NP	COL	MAG	ALA	BWE
Rain or Shine	NP	COL	TNT	MAG	PHX	ALA	BWE	BGSM	NLEX	SMB	MER
San Miguel	PHX	ALA	NLEX	MAG	BGSM	COL	NP	MER	BWE	ROS	TNT
TNT KaTropa	BWE	ROS	PHX	COL	NP	MER	ALA	NLEX	BGSM	MAG	SMB

= Win; = OT win; = Loss; = OT loss

=== Results ===
Teams	ALA	BGSM	BWE	COL	MAG	MER	NLEX	NP	PHX	ROS	SMB	TNT
Alaska	—	83–102	101–91	110–117	90–95	75–101	106–90	106–99	105–102	78–71	83–109	93–99*
Barangay Ginebra		—	101–93	113–90	105–83	77–101	111–113*	96–98	101–103	98–89	129–124	96–93
Blackwater			—	90–102	95–89	97–106	109–115	107–98	117–120*	82–99	96–99*	107–135
Columbian				—	103–118	74–92	111–117	114–108	106–104	90–96	107–113	120–125
Magnolia					—	92–98	85–86	96–80	97–81	69–68	89–90	100–93
Meralco						—	99–105	103–89	111–94	81–83	125–99	113–116
NLEX							—	94–102	123–116	111–91	94–98	126–113
NorthPort								—	80–70	99–94	127–119	100–103
Phoenix Pulse									—	86–84	119–130	118–123
Rain or Shine										—	91–85	91–103
San Miguel											—	109–114
TNT												—

Legend: Blue = left column team win; Red = top row team win.
Matches with lighter background shading were decided after overtime.

== Bracket ==
Quarterfinals (Top 4 twice-to-beat)
1	NLEX	90	123
8	NorthPort	115	126***
4	Barangay Ginebra	100
5	San Miguel	97
2	Meralco	94
7	Alaska	84
3	TNT	98
6	Magnolia	97

Semifinals (Best-of-5)
8	NorthPort	1
4	Barangay Ginebra	3
2	Meralco	3
3	TNT	2

Finals (Best-of-7)
4	Barangay Ginebra	4
2	Meralco	1

***Game went into triple overtime

== Quarterfinals ==
=== (1) NLEX vs. (8) NorthPort ===
ESPN5

November 25
4:30 pm

Box score

NLEX Road Warriors 90, NorthPort Batang Pier 115
Scoring by quarter: 24–34, 16–27, 24–22, 26–32
Pts: Quiñahan 20; Rebs: Erram 10; Asts: Ravena 5	Pts: Qualls 39; Rebs: Qualls 16; Asts: Elorde 6

Smart Araneta Coliseum, Quezon City
Referees: N. Quilinguen, B. Oliva, R. Dacanay, A. Nubla

ESPN5

November 27
7:00 pm

Box score

NLEX Road Warriors 123, NorthPort Batang Pier 126 (3OT)
Scoring by quarter: 27–24, 29–19, 18–27, 25–29, Overtime: 9–9, 8–8, 7–10
Pts: Harris 43; Rebs: Harris 16; Asts: Ravena 6	Pts: Standhardinger 33; Rebs: Standhardinger 23; Asts: Standhardinger 7
NorthPort wins series in two games

Smart Araneta Coliseum, Quezon City
Referees: P. Balao, J. Mariano, R. Dacanay, M. Flordeliza

=== (2) Meralco vs. (7) Alaska ===
ESPN5

November 24
4:30 pm

Box score

Meralco Bolts 94, Alaska Aces 84
Scoring by quarter: 29–12, 20–21, 24–30, 21–21
Pts: Durham 28; Rebs: Durham 16; Asts: Durham 8	Pts: Casio 20; Rebs: House 9 Asts: Ahanmisi 4
Meralco wins series in one game

Smart Araneta Coliseum, Quezon City
Referees: J. Mariano, R. Yante, J. Narandan, J. Tantay

=== (3) TNT vs. (6) Magnolia ===
ESPN5

November 25
7:00 pm

Box score

TNT KaTropa 98, Magnolia Hotshots Pambansang Manok 97
Scoring by quarter: 22–26, 26–28, 18–26, 32–17
Pts: Castro 30; Rebs: McDaniels 17; Asts: Castro 7	Pts: Travis 32; Rebs: Travis 26; Asts: Banchero 8
TNT wins series in one game

Smart Araneta Coliseum, Quezon City
Referees: P. Balao, M. Montoya, M. Orioste, N. Cortez

=== (4) Barangay Ginebra vs. (5) San Miguel ===
ESPN5

November 24
6:45 pm

Box score

Barangay Ginebra San Miguel 100, San Miguel Beermen 97
Scoring by quarter: 23–23, 31–35, 24–25, 22–14
Pts: Brownlee 41; Rebs: Brownlee 11; Asts: Tenorio 7	Pts: Fajardo 24; Rebs: Fajardo 18; Asts: Cabagnot 6
Barangay Ginebra wins series in one game

Smart Araneta Coliseum, Quezon City
Referees: S. Pineda, R. Gruta, J. Nicandro, J. Jarabejo

== Semifinals ==
=== (2) Meralco vs. (3) TNT ===
ESPN5

December 15
6:30 pm

Box score

Meralco Bolts 94, TNT KaTropa 103
Scoring by quarter: 25–22, 16–25, 20–30, 33–26
Pts: Durham 32; Rebs: Durham 21; Asts: Durham, Jackson 3	Pts: McDaniels 38; Rebs: McDaniels 14; Asts: Castro 7

Smart Araneta Coliseum, Quezon City
Referees: S. Pineda, R. Yante, J. Tantay, J. Baldago

ESPN5

December 17
7:00 pm

Box score

Meralco Bolts 114, TNT KaTropa 94
Scoring by quarter: 35–16, 28–13, 26–37, 25–28
Pts: Durham 44; Rebs: Durham 19; Asts: Durham 11	Pts: McDaniels 51; Rebs: McDaniels 9 Asts: McDaniels, Parks 3

Smart Araneta Coliseum, Quezon City
Referees: J. Mariano, R. Gruta, R. Dacanay, A. Nubla

ESPN5

December 19
7:00 pm

Box score

Meralco Bolts 97, TNT KaTropa 101
Scoring by quarter: 29–23, 22–19, 20–35, 26–24
Pts: Durham 32; Rebs: Durham 19; Asts: Durham 7	Pts: Rosario 25; Rebs: McDaniels 14; Asts: Castro 10

Smart Araneta Coliseum, Quezon City
Referees: P. Balao, S. Pineda, M. Montoya, J. Jarabejo

ESPN5

December 21
6:30 pm

Box score

Meralco Bolts 95, TNT KaTropa 83
Scoring by quarter: 18–24, 33–21, 22–23, 22–15
Pts: Durham 36; Rebs: Durham 19; Asts: Amer 7	Pts: McDaniels 26; Rebs: McDaniels 9 Asts: Castro 7

Ynares Center, Antipolo
Referees: N. Quilingen, R. Dacanay, M. Flordeliza, J. Narandan

ESPN5

December 23
7:00 pm

Box score

Meralco Bolts 89, TNT KaTropa 78
Scoring by quarter: 22–23, 15–19, 29–19, 23–17
Pts: Durham 28; Rebs: Durham 10; Asts: Durham 8	Pts: McDaniels 30; Rebs: McDaniels 13; Asts: Castro, Parks 4
Meralco wins series, 3–2

Ynares Center, Antipolo
Referees: P. Balao, S. Pineda, R. Gruta, J. Tantay

=== (4) Barangay Ginebra vs. (8) NorthPort ===
ESPN5

December 14
6:30 pm

Box score

Barangay Ginebra San Miguel 90, NorthPort Batang Pier 124
Scoring by quarter: 22–20, 17–31, 29–27, 22–46
Pts: Brownlee 24; Rebs: Brownlee 19; Asts: Brownlee 6	Pts: Qualls 38; Rebs: Qualls, Standhardinger 15; Asts: Standhardinger 6

Smart Araneta Coliseum, Quezon City
Referees: N. Quilinguen, R. Dacanay, M. Flordeliza, J. Nicandro

ESPN5

December 16
7:00 pm

Box score

Barangay Ginebra San Miguel 113, NorthPort Batang Pier 88
Scoring by quarter: 31–18, 31–26, 32–26, 19–18
Pts: Pringle 23; Rebs: J. Aguilar 12; Asts: Thompson 6	Pts: Qualls 20; Rebs: Anthony 11; Asts: Elorde 7

Smart Araneta Coliseum, Quezon City
Referees: P. Balao, R. Gruta, B. Oliva, A. Nubla

ESPN5

December 18
7:00 pm

Box score

Barangay Ginebra San Miguel 132, NorthPort Batang Pier 105
Scoring by quarter: 36–31, 28–17, 36–24, 32–33
Pts: Brownlee 41; Rebs: Brownlee 11; Asts: Thompson 8	Pts: Qualls 32; Rebs: Qualls 10; Asts: Elorde 8

Smart Araneta Coliseum, Quezon City
Referees: J. Mariano, S. Pineda, M. Flordeliza, J. Narandan

ESPN5

December 20
7:00 pm

Box score

Barangay Ginebra San Miguel 120, NorthPort Batang Pier 107
Scoring by quarter: 32–21, 24–18, 30–36, 34–32
Pts: Brownlee 36; Rebs: Brownlee 19; Asts: Brownlee 8	Pts: Standhardinger 32; Rebs: Standhardinger 15; Asts: Qualls, Standhardinger 7
Barangay Ginebra wins series, 3–1

Smart Araneta Coliseum, Quezon City
Referees: P. Balao, R. Yante, J. Nicandro, J. Tantay

== Finals ==
ESPN5

January 7, 2020
7:00 pm

Box score

Meralco Bolts 87, Barangay Ginebra San Miguel 91

Smart Araneta Coliseum, Quezon City

ESPN5

January 10, 2020
7:00 pm

Box score

Meralco Bolts 104, Barangay Ginebra San Miguel 102

Quezon Convention Center, Lucena

ESPN5

January 12, 2020
6:30 pm

Box score

Meralco Bolts 84, Barangay Ginebra San Miguel 92

Smart Araneta Coliseum, Quezon City

ESPN5

January 15, 2020
7:00 pm

Box score

Meralco Bolts 72, Barangay Ginebra San Miguel 94

Smart Araneta Coliseum, Quezon City

ESPN5

January 17, 2020
7:00 pm

Box score

Meralco Bolts 93, Barangay Ginebra San Miguel 105
Barangay Ginebra wins series, 4–1

Mall of Asia Arena, Pasay

== Imports ==
The following is the list of imports, which had played for their respective teams at least once, with the returning imports in italics. Highlighted are the imports who stayed with their respective teams for the whole conference.

Team	Name	Debuted	Last game	Record
Alaska Aces	(United States) Justin Watts	September 20 (vs. Columbian)	September 22 (vs. Barangay Ginebra)	0–2
Alaska Aces	No import	September 29 (vs. San Miguel)		0–1
Alaska Aces	(United States) Franko House	October 4 (vs. Meralco)	November 24 (vs. Meralco)	5–4
Barangay Ginebra San Miguel	(United States) Justin Brownlee	September 22 (vs. Alaska)	January 17 (vs. Meralco)	15–6
Blackwater Elite	(United States) Marqus Blakely	September 25 (vs. TNT)	November 15 (vs. Phoenix)	2–8
Blackwater Elite	(United States) Aaron Fuller	October 11 (vs. Columbian)		0–1
Columbian Dyip	(United States) Khapri Alston	September 20 (vs. Alaska)	November 15 (vs. Barangay Ginebra)	4–7
Magnolia Hotshots Pambansang Manok	(North Macedonia) Romeo Travis	September 21 (vs. Meralco)	November 25 (vs. TNT)	6–5
Magnolia Hotshots Pambansang Manok	No import	October 16 (vs. Blackwater)		0–1
Meralco Bolts	(United States) Allen Durham	September 21 (vs. Magnolia)	January 17 (vs. Barangay Ginebra)	13–9
NLEX Road Warriors	(Nigeria) Olu Ashaolu	September 21 (vs. Phoenix)	October 5 (vs. Barangay Ginebra)	4–1
NLEX Road Warriors	(United States) Manny Harris	October 16 (vs. Columbian)	November 27 (vs. NorthPort)	4–4
NorthPort Batang Pier	(United States) Mychal Ammons	September 20 (vs. Rain or Shine)	October 12 (vs. Phoenix)	2–4
NorthPort Batang Pier	(United States) Michael Qualls	October 23 (vs. San Miguel)	December 20 (vs. Barangay Ginebra)	6–5
Phoenix Pulse Fuel Masters	(United States) Eugene Phelps	September 21 (vs. NLEX)	October 12 (vs. NorthPort)	2–5
Phoenix Pulse Fuel Masters	(United States) Alonzo Gee	October 25 (vs. Columbian)	November 15 (vs. Blackwater)	1–3
Rain or Shine Elasto Painters	(United States) Joel Wright	September 20 (vs. NorthPort)	September 28 (vs. TNT)	1–2
Rain or Shine Elasto Painters	(United States) Kayel Locke	October 4 (vs. Magnolia)	October 13 (vs. Alaska)	0–3
Rain or Shine Elasto Painters	(United States) Kwame Alexander	October 23 (vs. Blackwater)	October 26 (vs. Barangay Ginebra)	1–1
Rain or Shine Elasto Painters	(United States) Richard Ross	October 30 (vs. NLEX)	November 17 (vs. Meralco)	2–1
San Miguel Beermen	(United States) Dez Wells	September 25 (vs. Phoenix)	October 27 (vs. Meralco)	5–3
San Miguel Beermen	No import	November 6 (vs. Blackwater)		1–0
San Miguel Beermen	(United States) John Holland	November 9 (vs. Rain or Shine)	November 24 (vs. Barangay Ginebra)	0–3
TNT KaTropa	(United States) K. J. McDaniels	September 25 (vs. Blackwater)	December 23 (vs. Meralco)	11–6

== Awards ==
=== Conference ===
The Best Player and Best Import of the Conference awards were handed out prior to Game 4 of the Finals, at the Smart Araneta Coliseum:

- Best Player of the Conference: Christian Standhardinger (NorthPort Batang Pier)
- Best Import of the Conference: Allen Durham (Meralco Bolts)
- Finals MVP: Japeth Aguilar (Barangay Ginebra San Miguel)

=== Players of the Week ===
Week	Player	Ref.
September 20–22	Raymond Almazan (Meralco Bolts)	
September 23–29	Kiefer Ravena (NLEX Road Warriors)	
September 30 – October 6	Baser Amer (Meralco Bolts)	
October 7–13	Troy Rosario (TNT KaTropa); Jeron Teng (Alaska Aces)	
October 14–20	June Mar Fajardo (San Miguel Beermen); Raymond Almazan (Meralco Bolts)	
October 21–27	Christian Standhardinger (NorthPort Batang Pier)	
October 28 – November 3	Vic Manuel (Alaska Aces)	
November 4–10	Anjo Caram (Meralco Bolts)	

== Statistics ==
=== Individual statistical leaders ===
==== Local players ====
Category	Player	Team	Statistic
Points per game	CJ Perez	Columbian Dyip	23.2
Rebounds per game	June Mar Fajardo	San Miguel Beermen	14.0
Assists per game	Kiefer Ravena	NLEX Road Warriors	7.8
Steals per game	CJ Perez	Columbian Dyip	2.5
Blocks per game	John Paul Erram	NLEX Road Warriors	2.2
Turnovers per game	CJ Perez	Columbian Dyip	4.1
Fouls per game	Beau Belga	Rain or Shine Elasto Painters	4.1
Minutes per game	CJ Perez	Columbian Dyip	39.9
FG%	Japeth Aguilar	Barangay Ginebra San Miguel	59.2%
FT%	LA Tenorio	Barangay Ginebra San Miguel	95.5%
3FG%	Von Pessumal	San Miguel Beermen	45.0%
Double-doubles	June Mar Fajardo	San Miguel Beermen	12
Triple-doubles	Chris Newsome	Meralco Bolts	1

==== Import players ====
Category	Player	Team	Statistic
Points per game	Dez Wells	San Miguel Beermen	37.1
Rebounds per game	Khapri Alston	Columbian Dyip	18.2
Assists per game	Justin Brownlee	Barangay Ginebra San Miguel	6.8
Steals per game	Marqus Blakely	Blackwater Elite	3.5
Blocks per game	K. J. McDaniels	TNT KaTropa	3.4
Turnovers per game	K. J. McDaniels	TNT KaTropa	4.6
Fouls per game	Franko House	Alaska Aces	4.9
Minutes per game	Michael Qualls	NorthPort Batang Pier	46.2
FG%	Dez Wells	San Miguel Beermen	54.7%
FT%	Dez Wells	San Miguel Beermen	85.1%
3FG%	Marqus Blakely	Blackwater Elite	40.0%
Double-doubles	Allen Durham	Meralco Bolts	22
Triple-doubles	Justin Brownlee	Barangay Ginebra San Miguel	4

=== Individual game highs ===
==== Local players ====
Category	Player	Team	Statistic
Points	Bobby Ray Parks Jr.	Blackwater Elite	39
Rebounds	Raymond Almazan	Meralco Bolts	24
Assists	Kiefer Ravena	NLEX Road Warriors	17
Steals	Chris Ross	San Miguel Beermen	7
Blocks	Ian Sangalang	Magnolia Hotshots Pambansang Manok	7
Blocks	Japeth Aguilar	Barangay Ginebra San Miguel	7
Three point field goals	Rashawn McCarthy	Columbian Dyip	7
Three point field goals	Troy Rosario	TNT KaTropa	7

==== Import players ====
Category	Player	Team	Statistic
Points	Dez Wells	San Miguel Beermen	56
Rebounds	Allen Durham	Meralco Bolts	27
Assists	Justin Brownlee	Barangay Ginebra San Miguel	14
Steals	Manny Harris	NLEX Road Warriors	7
Blocks	Marqus Blakely	Blackwater Elite	8
Three point field goals	Manny Harris	NLEX Road Warriors	6
Three point field goals	K. J. McDaniels (twice)	TNT KaTropa	6
Three point field goals	Justin Brownlee	Barangay Ginebra San Miguel	6

=== Team statistical leaders ===
Category	Team	Statistic
Points per game	NLEX Road Warriors	106.7
Rebounds per game	Columbian Dyip	48.9
Assists per game	Barangay Ginebra San Miguel	26.6
Steals per game	Columbian Dyip	9.7
Blocks per game	Barangay Ginebra San Miguel	5.1
Turnovers per game	Magnolia Hotshots Pambansang Manok	16.8
FG%	Barangay Ginebra San Miguel	48.0%
FT%	NLEX Road Warriors	79.6%
3FG%	Barangay Ginebra San Miguel	36.5%
