= James Farr (basketball) =

American basketball player

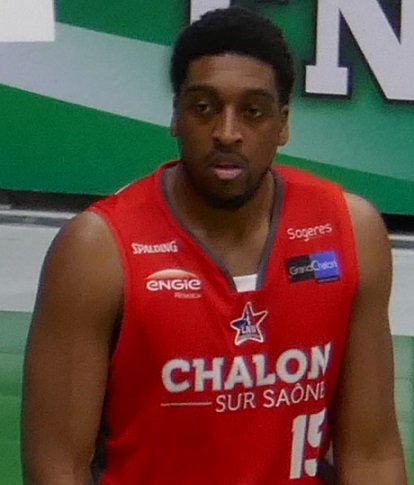

No. 2 – Al Khaleej
- Position: Power forward
- League: Saudi Basketball League

Personal information
- Born: November 2, 1992 (age 34) Evanston, Illinois, U.S.
- Listed height: 6 ft 10 in (2.08 m)
- Listed weight: 247 lb (112 kg)

Career information
- High school: Maine Central Institute (Pittsfield, Maine)
- College: Xavier (2012–2016)
- NBA draft: 2016: undrafted
- Playing career: 2016–present

Career history
- 2016–2017: Alba Fehérvár
- 2017–2018: Élan Chalon
- 2018–2019: Mitteldeutscher BC
- 2019: Magnolia Hotshots
- 2019–2020: KK Zadar
- 2020: Bambitious Nara
- 2021–2022: Benfica
- 2022–2023: Steaua Bucharest
- 2023–present: Al Khaleej

Career highlights
- Hungarian League champion (2017)

James Farr (born November 2, 1992) is an American professional basketball player for Al Khaleej of the Saudi Basketball League.

As a senior at Xavier, Farr averaged 10.7 points and 7.8 and rebounds per game. The Musketeers went 28–6 before losing to Wisconsin in the second round of the NCAA Tournament. After the season he participated in the Portsmouth Invitational Tournament.

After going undrafted in the 2016 NBA draft, Farr signed with Alba Fehérvár of the Hungarian league. "It's very exciting, but there are some nerves knowing that I'm going to be living in a different country for a year," said Farr. In June 2017 he signed with Élan Chalon of the French side. Farr inked a one-year deal with Mitteldeutscher BC on August 10, 2018. In June 2019, he signed with the Magnolia Hotshots of the Philippine Basketball Association as their import for the 2019 PBA Commissioner's Cup.

On August 8, 2021, he has signed with Benfica of the Liga Portuguesa de Basquetebol.
