= 2018 PBA draft =

Player selection in Philippine basketball

General information
- Date: December 16, 2018
- Location: Robinsons Place Manila
- Networks: ESPN 5 (The 5 Network, PBA Rush, TV5.Espn.com)

Overview
- League: Philippine Basketball Association
- First selection: CJ Perez (Columbian Dyip)

The 2018 Philippine Basketball Association (PBA) rookie draft was an event that allowed teams to take turns selecting amateur basketball players and other eligible players, including half-Filipino foreign players. The league determined the drafting order based on the performance of the member teams from the 2017–18 season, with the worst team picking first.

== Draft order ==
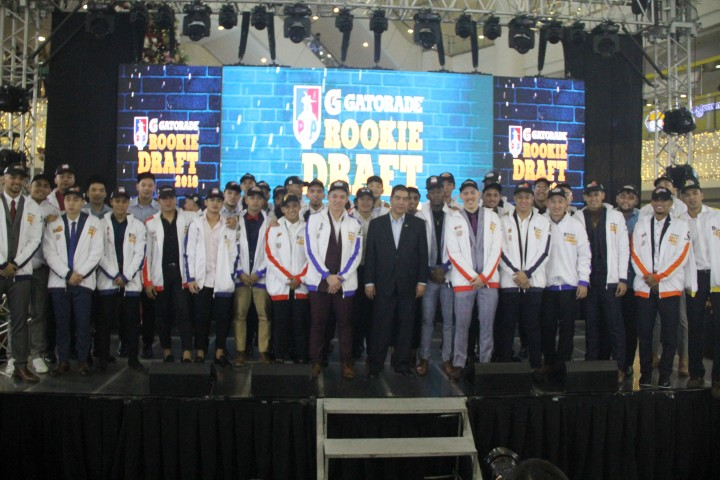
PBA Commissioner Willy Marcial posing with players selected in the 2018 PBA Rookie Draft.

The draft order is determined based on the overall performance of the teams from the previous season. The Philippine Cup final ranking comprises 40% of the points, while the rankings of the Commissioner's and Governors' Cups are 30% each.

Draft order	Team	Final ranking			Total
Draft order	Team	PHL	COM	GOV	Total
1st	Columbian Dyip	12th	9th	12th	11.1
2nd	Blackwater Elite	10th	12th	6th	9.4
3rd	NorthPort Batang Pier	7th	8th	11th	8.5
4th	Phoenix Fuel Masters	9th	10th	5th	8.1
5th	Meralco Bolts	11th	6th	4th	7.4
6th	TNT KaTropa	8th	5th	9th	7.4
7th	NLEX Road Warriors	4th	11th	8th	7.3
8th	Rain or Shine Elasto Painters	6th	3rd	10th	6.3
9th	Alaska Aces	5th	4th	1st or 2nd	3.8 or 3.5
10th	Magnolia Hotshots Pambansang Manok	2nd	7th	1st or 2nd	3.5 or 3.2
11th	San Miguel Beermen	1st	2nd	7th	3.1
12th	Barangay Ginebra San Miguel	3rd	1st	3rd	2.4

On draft day, Alaska and Magnolia were playing in the 2018 PBA Governors' Cup Finals. Alaska would've finished either with 3.8 or 3.5 points, in 9th position. Magnolia would've finished with 3.2 or 3.5 points, in 10th position. Magnolia eventually won.

== Draft selections ==
=== 1st round ===
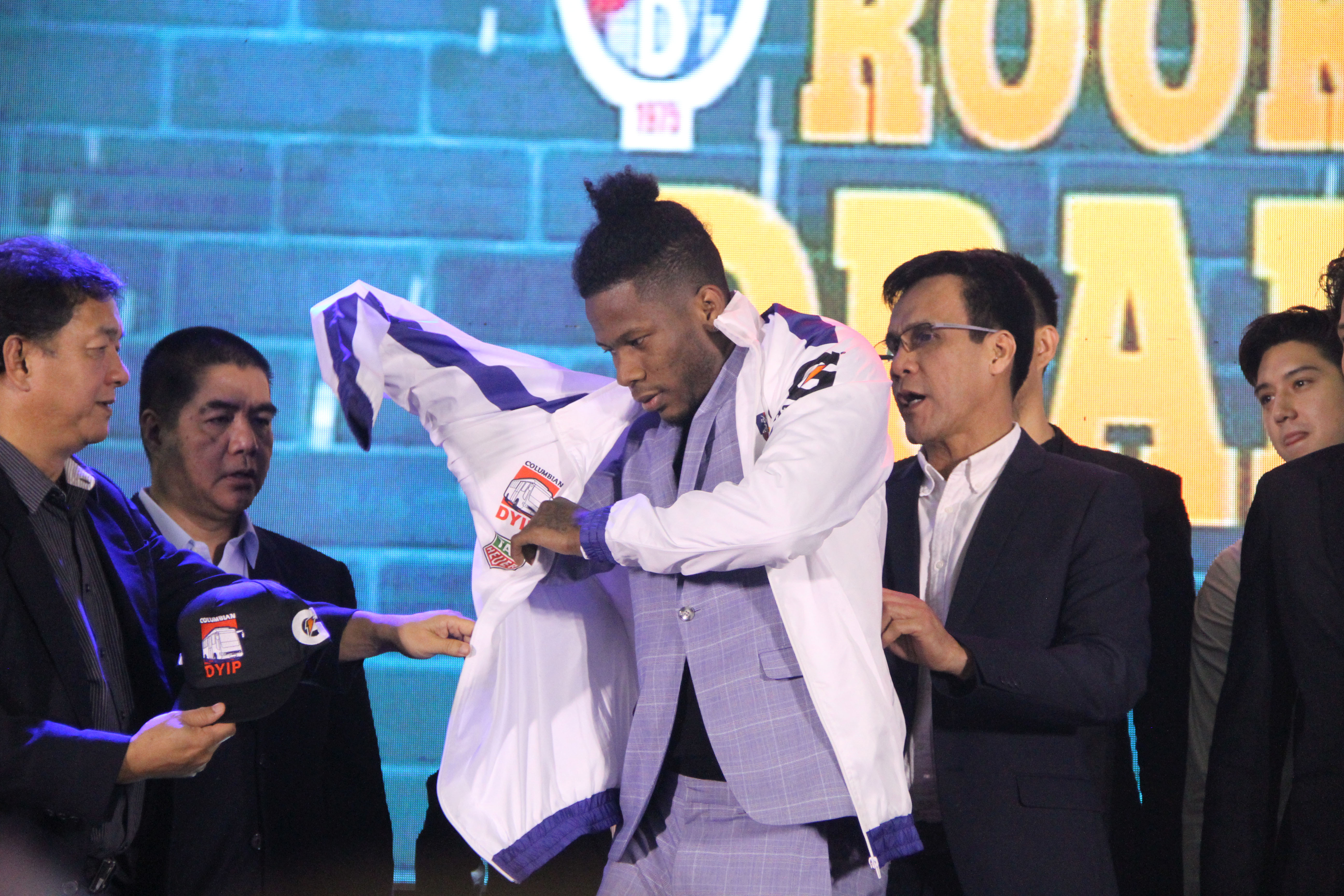
CJ Perez receives the Columbian Dyip team jacket during the first round of the 2018 PBA Rookie Draft.

PG	Point guard	SG	Shooting guard	SF	Small forward	PF	Power forward	C	Center	*	Mythical team member	^{#}	All-Star

Round	Pick	Player	Pos.	Country of birth	Team	PBA D-League team	School
1	1	CJ Perez*	SG/SF	Hong Kong	Columbian Dyip	Zark's Jawbreakers - LPU	Lyceum
1	2	Bobby Ray Parks Jr.	SG/PG	Philippines	Blackwater Elite	NU-Banco De Oro; Hapee Fresh Fighters	National U
1	3	Robert Bolick*	PG/SG	Philippines	NorthPort Batang Pier	Cignal HD - San Beda	San Beda
1	4	Paul Desiderio	SG	Philippines	NLEX Road Warriors (from Phoenix) (Note: December 13, 2018: Phoenix to NLEX: NLEX acquired a first round pick and a 2019 second round pick; Phoenix acquired Alex Mallari and Dave Marcelo)	Go for Gold	Philippines
1	5	Trevis Jackson	PG/SG	United States	Meralco Bolts	Gamboa Coffee Mixers	Sacramento State
1	6	Javee Mocon	SF/PF	Philippines	Rain or Shine Elasto Painters (from TNT) (Note: February 15, 2018: TNT to Rain or Shine: Rain or Shine acquired a first round pick, Kris Rosales, and Sidney Onwubere; TNT acquired Jericho Cruz)	Cignal HD - San Beda	San Beda
1	7	Abu Tratter	C/PF	Philippines	NLEX Road Warriors	Marinerong Pilipino Skippers	De La Salle
1	8	Jayjay Alejandro	SG	Philippines	Rain or Shine Elasto Painters	Go for Gold Scratchers	National U
1	9	MJ Ayaay	SF/SG	Philippines	Alaska Aces	Zark's Jawbreakers - LPU	Lyceum
1	10	Michael Calisaan	PF	Philippines	Magnolia Hotshots Pambansang Manok	Che'Lu Bar and Grill - SSC-R	San Sebastian
1	11	J. P. Calvo	PG	Philippines	Columbian Dyip (from San Miguel) (Note: November 3, 2016: San Miguel to Columbian (Mahindra) (three-team trade with Magnolia [Star]): Mahindra acquired a first round pick and Ryan Araña from San Miguel and Alex Mallari from Star; San Miguel acquired Keith Agovida from Mahindra and RR Garcia from Star via Mahindra; Star acquired Aldrech Ramos and a 2017 second round pick from Mahindra)	Wang's Basketball Couriers	Letran
1	12	Jorey Napoles	SF	Philippines	Phoenix Fuel Masters (from Ginebra) (Note: June 18, 2018: Ginebra to Phoenix: Phoenix acquired a first round pick; Ginebra acquired Jeff Chan)	Marinerong Pilipino Skippers	TIP

=== 2nd round ===
Round	Pick	Player	Pos.	Country of birth	Team	PBA D-League team	School
2	13	Paul Varilla	SF	United States	Rain or Shine Elasto Painters (from Columbian) (Note: October 14, 2016: Columbian (Mahindra) to Rain or Shine: Rain or Shine acquired a second round pick; Mahindra acquired Josan Nimes)	Tanduay Light	UE
2	14	Bong Quinto	SF	Philippines	Meralco Bolts (from Blackwater) (Note: March 28, 2017: Blackwater to Meralco (three-team trade with NLEX): Meralco acquired a second round pick from Blackwater; Blackwater re-acquired a 2017 second round pick from NLEX; NLEX acquired Rabeh Al-Hussaini from Meralco via Blackwater)	Wang's Basketball Couriers	Letran
2	15	Jeepy Faundo	C	Philippines	Magnolia Hotshots Pambansang Manok (from NorthPort) (Note: August 24, 2014: NorthPort (GlobalPort) to Magnolia (San Mig Coffee): San Mig Coffee acquired a second round pick and a 2016 first round pick; GlobalPort acquired the draft rights to Anthony Semerad and a 2016 first round pick)	Che'Lu Bar and Grill - SSC-R	Santo Tomas
2	16	Kris Porter	C	Philippines	NLEX Road Warriors (from Phoenix) (Note: May 5, 2016: Phoenix to NLEX: NLEX acquired Mac Baracael, Emman Monfort, and a second round pick; Phoenix acquired Simon Enciso and Mark Borboran)	Go for Gold	Ateneo
2	17	Gideon Babilonia	C	Philippines	Alaska Aces (from Meralco via Phoenix) (Note: July 13, 2016: Phoenix to Alaska: Alaska acquired a second round pick, which was the best remaining pick from Meralco; Phoenix acquired Cyrus Baguio)	Marinerong Pilipino	Ateneo
2	18	Cyrus Tabi	PG	Philippines	Columbian Dyip (from TNT via NLEX and Phoenix) (Note: November 15, 2017: Phoenix to Columbian (Kia): Kia acquired a second round pick and Jason Grimaldo; Phoenix acquired LA Revilla; November 6, 2017: NLEX to Phoenix: Phoenix acquired the pick; NLEX acquired Michael Miranda; September 22, 2014: TNT (Talk 'N Text) to NLEX (three-team trade with NorthPort [GlobalPort]): NLEX acquired the pick and Harold Arboleda from GlobalPort; Talk 'n Text acquired Jay Washington from GlobalPort and Matt Ganuelas from NLEX via GlobalPort; GlobalPort acquired a 2017 first round pick from Talk 'n Text)	Batangas-EAC	Rizal Tech
2	19	Robbie Manalang	PG	United States	Rain or Shine Elasto Painters (from NLEX) (Note: August 24, 2015: NLEX to Rain or Shine: Rain or Shine acquired a second round pick; NLEX acquired Simon Enciso)	Marinerong Pilipino	Adamson
2	20	Harold Ng	SG	Philippines	Rain or Shine Elasto Painters	AMA	Adamson
2	–	PASS			Alaska Aces		
2	–	PASS			Magnolia Hotshots Pambansang Manok		
2	21	Ron Dennison	SG/SF	Philippines	Phoenix Fuel Masters (from San Miguel via NorthPort) (Note: March 1, 2016: NorthPort (GlobalPort) to Phoenix: Phoenix acquired a second round pick; GlobalPort acquired Jeric Fortuna; December 10, 2014: San Miguel to NorthPort (GlobalPort): GlobalPort acquired the pick and a 2019 second round pick, and re-acquired Sol Mercado; San Miguel re-acquired Alex Cabagnot)	Go for Gold	Far Eastern
2	22	Joe Allen Trinidad	PG	United States	Phoenix Fuel Masters (from Ginebra) (Note: November 16, 2015: Ginebra to Barako Bull (Phoenix): Barako Bull acquired a second round pick and Rodney Brondial; Ginebra acquired Jervy Cruz)	Wang's Basketball Couriers	Far Eastern

=== 3rd round ===
Round	Pick	Player	Pos.	Country of birth	Team	PBA D-League team	School
3	23	Teytey Teodoro	PG/SG	Philippines	Columbian Dyip	José Rizal	José Rizal
3	24	Diego Dario	PG	Philippines	Blackwater Elite	AMA	Philippines
3	25	Edrian Lao	C/PF	Philippines	NorthPort Batang Pier	Cagayan Rising Suns	Visayas
3	26	Ivan Villanueva	PF	Philippines	Phoenix Fuel Masters	AMA	Adamson
3	27	Steven Cudal	PF	Philippines	Meralco Bolts	Zark's Jawbreakers	UE
3	28	Jeffrey Ongteco	C/PF	Philippines	TNT KaTropa	Flying V	Benilde
3	29	Kyles Lao	SG	Philippines	NLEX Road Warriors	AMA	Philippines
3	30	Kent Lao	PF	Philippines	Rain or Shine Elasto Painters	Che'Lu Bar and Grill	UST
3	31	Ryan Monteclaro	PG	Philippines	San Miguel Beermen	Boracay Rum	Adamson
3	32	Matt Salem	SF	United States	Barangay Ginebra San Miguel	Go for Gold	National U

=== 4th round ===
Round	Pick	Player	Pos.	Country of birth	Team	PBA D-League team	School
4	33	Oliver Arim	SF/SG	Philippines	Columbian Dyip	Batangas-EAC	Centro Escolar
4	34	Dan Alberto	PG	Philippines	Blackwater Elite	AMA	UE
4	35	Jeremiah Taladua	SG	Philippines	NorthPort Batang Pier	Wang's Basketball Couriers	Letran
4	36	Kim Cinco	PG	Philippines	Phoenix Fuel Masters	Zark's Burger	Lyceum
4	–	PASS			Meralco Bolts		
4	37	C. J. Isit	PG	Canada	TNT KaTropa	Batangas-EAC	Mapúa
4	38	Dan Wong	PG	United States	NLEX Road Warriors	Go for Gold	Ateneo
4	39	Al Josef Cariaga	PG	Canada	Rain or Shine Elasto Painters	Zark's Burger	Southern Alberta
4	–	PASS			San Miguel Beermen		
4	–	PASS			Barangay Ginebra San Miguel		

=== 5th round ===
Round	Pick	Player	Pos.	Country of birth	Team	PBA D-League team	School
5	–	PASS			Columbian Dyip		
5	40	Chris de la Peña	C	Philippines	Blackwater Elite	Batangas-EAC	Letran
5	41	John Ragasa	SG	United Kingdom	NorthPort Batang Pier	Batangas-EAC	St. Mary's (London)
5	–	PASS			Phoenix Fuel Masters		
5	–	PASS			TNT KaTropa		
5	–	PASS			NLEX Road Warriors		
5	–	PASS			Rain or Shine Elasto Painters		

=== 6th round ===
A sixth round was held, but both Blackwater and NorthPort passed, thus ending the draft.

== Trades involving draft picks ==
=== Pre-draft trades ===
Note: The rights to Barako Bull's draft pick were retained by Phoenix.
Prior to the day of the draft, the following trades were made and resulted in exchanges of picks between the teams.

=== Draft-day trades ===
No trades were allowed during the draft day as requested by commissioner Willie Marcial.

== Draft picks per school ==
School	1st round	After 1st round	Total
Letran	1	3	4
Adamson	0	4	4
Lyceum	2	1	3
National U	2	1	3
UP	1	2	3
UE	0	3	3
Ateneo	0	3	3
San Beda	2	0	2
UST	0	2	2
Far Eastern	0	2	2
Other schools			1 each

== Undrafted players ==
Name	School	PBA D-League team
Jeric Serrano	Lyceum	Zark's Burger
Emanuel Calo	Visayas	MP Hotel
A. J. Coronel	Perpetual	
Clark Derige	UE	Batangas-EAC
Jerome Garcia	EAC	Batangas-EAC
Ralph Salcedo	Arellano	Marinerong Pilipino
