= 2015–16 Rain or Shine Elasto Painters season =

- Head coach: Yeng Guiao
- Owners: Asian Coatings Philippines, Inc.

Philippine Cup results
- Record: 8–3 (72.7%)
- Place: 3rd
- Playoff finish: Semifinalist (lost to San Miguel, 2–4)

Commissioner's Cup results
- Record: 7–4 (63.6%)
- Place: 5th
- Playoff finish: Champions (def. Alaska, 4-2)

Governors' Cup results
- Record: 5–6 (45.5%)
- Place: 9th
- Playoff finish: Did not qualify

Rain or Shine Elasto Painters seasons

The 2015–16 Rain or Shine Elasto Painters season was the 10th season of the franchise in the Philippine Basketball Association (PBA).

== Key dates ==
- August 23: The 2015 PBA draft took place at Midtown Atrium, Robinson Place Manila.

== Draft picks ==
Round	Pick	Player	Position	Nationality	PBA D-League team	College
1	3	Maverick Ahanmisi	PG	United States	Café France Bakers	Minnesota
1	12	Josan Nimes	SF	Philippines	Café France Bakers	Mapúa
2	14	Don Trollano	SF	Philippines	Cagayan Rising Suns	Adamson
2	17	Simon Enciso	PG	United States	Cebuana Lhuiller Gems	Notre Dame de Namur

== Roster ==
2015–16 Rain or Shine Elasto Painters roster
Players
Coaches

Pos.	#	POB	Name	Height	Weight	DOB (YYYY–MM–DD)	From
G	3	(Philippines)	Paul Lee	6 ft 0 in (1.83 m)	200 lb (91 kg)	1989–02–14	UE
F	5	(United States)	Gabe Norwood	6 ft 6 in (1.98 m)	210 lb (95 kg)	1985–02–09	George Mason
F	6	(Philippines)	Jireh Ibañes (injured) (C)	6 ft 2 in (1.88 m)	182 lb (83 kg)	1982–04–20	Philippines
G	8	(Philippines)	Jeric Teng	6 ft 2 in (1.88 m)	180 lb (82 kg)	1991–03–18	UST
G	9	(Philippines)	Jericho Cruz	6 ft 1 in (1.85 m)	190 lb (86 kg)	1990–10–11	Adamson
G	13	(United States)	Maverick Ahanmisi	6 ft 2 in (1.88 m)	185 lb (84 kg)	1991–07–17	Minnesota
F/C	15	(Philippines)	Jewel Ponferada	6 ft 5 in (1.96 m)	211 lb (96 kg)	1988–07–08	National-U
G/F	16	(Philippines)	Jeffrei Chan	6 ft 2 in (1.88 m)	185 lb (84 kg)	1983–02–11	Far Eastern
G	17	(Philippines)	Chris Tiu	6 ft 0 in (1.83 m)	176 lb (80 kg)	1985–07–15	Ateneo
F	19	(Philippines)	Don Trollano	6 ft 3 in (1.91 m)	182 lb (83 kg)	1992–01–07	Adamson
C	20	(Philippines)	Raymond Almazan	6 ft 8 in (2.03 m)	194 lb (88 kg)	1989–08–02	Letran
G/F	23	(Philippines)	Josan Nimes	6 ft 3 in (1.91 m)	175 lb (79 kg)	1991–05–11	Mapúa
F/C	30	(Philippines)	Beau Belga	6 ft 5 in (1.96 m)	235 lb (107 kg)	1986–11–30	Philippine Christian
F/C	48	(Philippines)	J.R. Quiñahan	6 ft 5 in (1.96 m)	235 lb (107 kg)	1984–05–08	Visayas

Head coach

- (Philippines) Yeng Guiao

Assistant coach(es)

- (Philippines) Caloy Garcia (1st Assistant)
- (Philippines) Mike Buendia
- (Philippines) Ricky Umayam

Team manager

- (Philippines) Mamerto Mondragon
- (Philippines) Jay Legacion (1st Assistant)

Legend

- (C) Team captain
- (CI) Commissioner's Cup Import
- (GI) Governors' Cup Import
- (EI) EASL Import
- (DP) Unsigned draft pick
- (FA) Free agent
- (IN) Inactive
- (S) Suspended
- (R) Rookie
- Injured

Roster

- ^{a} also serves as Rain or Shine's board governor.

== Philippine Cup ==
=== Eliminations ===
==== Standings ====
Pos	Team	W	L	PCT	GB	Qualification
1	Alaska Aces	9	2	.818 (Note: Head-to-head record: Alaska 1–0 San Miguel)	—	Advance to semifinals
2	San Miguel Beermen	9	2	.818	—	Advance to semifinals
3	Rain or Shine Elasto Painters	8	3	.727	1	Twice-to-beat in the quarterfinals
4	Barangay Ginebra San Miguel	7	4	.636 (Note: Head-to-head record: Barangay Ginebra 1–0 GlobalPort)	2	Twice-to-beat in the quarterfinals
5	GlobalPort Batang Pier	7	4	.636	2	Twice-to-beat in the quarterfinals
6	TNT Tropang Texters	6	5	.545	3	Twice-to-beat in the quarterfinals
7	NLEX Road Warriors	5	6	.455 (Note: Head-to-head record: NLEX 1–0 Barako Bull)	4	Twice-to-win in the quarterfinals
8	Barako Bull Energy	5	6	.455	4	Twice-to-win in the quarterfinals
9	Star Hotshots	4	7	.364	5	Twice-to-win in the quarterfinals
10	Blackwater Elite	3	8	.273	6	Twice-to-win in the quarterfinals
11	Mahindra Enforcer	2	9	.182	7	
12	Meralco Bolts	1	10	.091	8	

Source: PBA.ph

=== Playoffs ===
==== Bracket ====
Quarterfinals (1st phase) (Higher seeds twice-to-beat)
3	Rain or Shine	95
10	Blackwater	90
6	TNT	90
7	NLEX	88
4	Barangay Ginebra	92*
9	Star	89
5	GlobalPort	94
8	Barako Bull	85

Quarterfinals (2nd phase) (Single elimination)
3	Rain or Shine	104
6	TNT	89
4	Barangay Ginebra	83
5	GlobalPort	84*

Semifinals (Best-of-7)
2	San Miguel	4
3	Rain or Shine	2
1	Alaska	4
5	GlobalPort	1

Finals (Best-of-7)
2	San Miguel	4
1	Alaska	3

*Game went into overtime

== Commissioner's Cup ==
=== Eliminations ===
==== Standings ====
Pos	Team	W	L	PCT	GB	Qualification
1	San Miguel Beermen	8	3	.727 (Note: Head-to-head record: San Miguel 1–0 Meralco)	—	Twice-to-beat in the quarterfinals
2	Meralco Bolts	8	3	.727	—	Twice-to-beat in the quarterfinals
3	Alaska Aces	7	4	.636 (Note: Head-to-head quotient: Alaska 1.18, Barangay Ginebra 1.03, Rain or Shine 0.84)	1	Best-of-three quarterfinals
4	Barangay Ginebra San Miguel	7	4	.636	1	Best-of-three quarterfinals
5	Rain or Shine Elasto Painters	7	4	.636	1	Best-of-three quarterfinals
6	Tropang TNT	6	5	.545	2	Best-of-three quarterfinals
7	NLEX Road Warriors	5	6	.455 (Note: Head-to-head record: NLEX 1–0 Star)	3	Twice-to-win in the quarterfinals
8	Star Hotshots	5	6	.455	3	Twice-to-win in the quarterfinals
9	Mahindra Enforcer	4	7	.364	4	
10	Blackwater Elite	3	8	.273 (Note: Head-to-head quotient: Blackwater 1.04, Phoenix 0.99, GlobalPort 0.98)	5	
11	Phoenix Fuel Masters	3	8	.273	5	
12	GlobalPort Batang Pier	3	8	.273	5	

Source: PBA.ph

=== Playoffs ===
==== Bracket ====
Quarterfinals
(#1 twice-to-beat)
1	San Miguel	99	103
8	Star	108	99
(Best-of-3)
4	Barangay Ginebra	0
5	Rain or Shine	2
(#2 twice-to-beat)
2	Meralco	104
7	NLEX	97
(Best-of-3)
3	Alaska	2
6	TNT	1

Semifinals (Best-of-5)
1	San Miguel	1
5	Rain or Shine	3
2	Meralco	2
3	Alaska	3

Finals (Best-of-7)
5	Rain or Shine	4
3	Alaska	2

== Governors' Cup ==
=== Eliminations ===
==== Standings ====
Pos	Team	W	L	PCT	GB	Qualification
1	TNT KaTropa	10	1	.909	—	Twice-to-beat in the quarterfinals
2	San Miguel Beermen	8	3	.727 (Note: Head-to-head record: San Miguel 1–0 Barangay Ginebra)	2	Twice-to-beat in the quarterfinals
3	Barangay Ginebra San Miguel	8	3	.727	2	Twice-to-beat in the quarterfinals
4	Meralco Bolts	6	5	.545 (Note: Head-to-head quotient: Meralco 1.039, Mahindra 1.017, Alaska 0.950; fourth seed playoff: Meralco 104–99 Mahindra)	4	Twice-to-beat in the quarterfinals
5	Mahindra Enforcer	6	5	.545	4	Twice-to-win in the quarterfinals
6	Alaska Aces	6	5	.545	4	Twice-to-win in the quarterfinals
7	NLEX Road Warriors	5	6	.455 (Note: Head-to-head quotient: NLEX 1.04, Rain or Shine 1.03, Phoenix 0.93; eighth seed playoff: Phoenix 105–94 Rain or Shine)	5	Twice-to-win in the quarterfinals
8	Phoenix Fuel Masters	5	6	.455	5	Twice-to-win in the quarterfinals
9	Rain or Shine Elasto Painters	5	6	.455	5	
10	GlobalPort Batang Pier	4	7	.364	6	
11	Star Hotshots	2	9	.182	8	
12	Blackwater Elite	1	10	.091	9	

Source: PBA.ph

== Transactions ==
=== Free agency ===
Player	Date signed	Contract amount	Contract length	Former team
Ronnie Matias	2015	Not disclosed	One-year	Barako Bull Energy

=== Trades ===
Off-season

August 18, 2015	To GlobalPort Jervy Cruz	To Rain or Shine Jewel Ponferada
August 24, 2015	To NLEX Simon Enciso	To Rain or Shine 2018 2nd round pick

September 23, 2015	To Barako Bull Ronald Pascual (from San Miguel)	To Rain or Shine 2016 2nd round pick(from Barako Bull)	To San Miguel Ryan Araña (from Rain or Shine via Barako Bull)

Governor's Cup

October 16, 2016	To Rain or Shine Jay Washington	To GlobalPort J.R. Quiñahan
October 16, 2016	To Rain or Shine James Yap	To Star Paul Lee

=== Recruited imports ===
Tournament	Name	Debuted	Last game	Record
Commissioner's Cup	Wayne Chism	February 13 (vs. Star)	February 17 (vs. Meralco)	1–1
Commissioner's Cup	Antoine Wright	February 21 (vs. Ginebra)	March 4 (vs. NLEX)	1–2
Commissioner's Cup	Mo Charlo	March 11 (vs. San Miguel)	April 5 (vs. GlobalPort)	4−1
Commissioner's Cup	Pierre Henderson-Niles	April 10 (vs. Blackwater)	May 18 (vs. Alaska)	10–3
Governors' Cup	(United States) Dior Lowhorn	July 20 (vs. TNT)	August 27 (vs. GlobalPort)	3–4
Governors' Cup	(United States) Jason Forte	September 2 (vs. Mahindra)	September 4 (vs. NLEX)	1–1
Governors' Cup	(United States) Josh Dollard	September 10 (vs. San Miguel)	September 21 (vs. Phoenix)	1–2
