= 2014 Letran Knights basketball team =

2014 Letran Knights men's basketball

Record
- Elims rank: #6
- Final rank: #6
- 2014 record: 9–9
- Head coach: Caloy Garcia (2nd season)
- Assistant coaches: Elvis Tolentino; Ricky Umayam; Ronjay Enrile; Gerard Francisco; Mike Buendia
- Captain: Mark Cruz (4th season)

The 2014 Letran Knights men's basketball team represented Colegio de San Juan de Letran in the 90th season of the National Collegiate Athletic Association in the Philippines. The men's basketball tournament for the school year 2014–15 began on June 28, 2014, and the host school for the season was Jose Rizal University.

The Knights finished the double round-robin eliminations at sixth place with 9 wins against 9 losses. This is the first time the Knights missed the Final Four playoffs since 2010.

== Roster ==
Letran Knights roster
Players
Coaches

Pos.	No.	Nat.	Name	Height	Year	High School
G	4	(Philippines)	Calvo, John Paul	6'0" (1.83m)	1st	Hua Siong College of Iloilo
G	5	(Philippines)	Castro, Fidel Albert	6'1" (1.85m)	2nd	Olivarez College
F	6	(Philippines)	Saldua, Reuben Chester	6'4" (1.93m)	1st	University of Perpetual Help System DALTA
F	7	(Philippines)	Ruaya, Reneford	6'2" (1.88m)	2nd	Agusan Institute of Technology
G	8	(Philippines)	Tambeling, John Von Jovi	6'0" (1.83m)	2nd	Mantangale National High School
G	9	(Philippines)	Cruz, Mark L. (C)	5'7" (1.7m)	4th	Colegio de San Juan de Letran
G	10	(Philippines)	Luib, McJour	5'11" (1.8m)	3rd	Colegio de San Juan de Letran
F	11	(Philippines)	De La Peña, Chrisantoni	6'4" (1.93m)	1st	De La Salle Lipa
F	12	(Israel)	Apreku, Felix Jr.	6'4" (1.93m)	1st	PCU Dasmarinas
G	13	(Philippines)	Nambatac, Rey Benedict	5'11" (1.8m)	2nd	Colegio de San Juan de Letran
G	14	(Philippines)	Quinto, Kier John	6'0" (1.83m)	1st	Colegio de San Juan de Letran
F	15	(Philippines)	Gabawan, Jamil Joseph	6'3" (1.91m)	4th	Balanga National HS
F	16	(Philippines)	Racal, Kevin Kent (injured) (C)	6'3" (1.91m)	4th	Muntinlupa National High School
F	17	(United States)	Singontiko, Daryl O.	6'3" (1.91m)	1st	Chaminade College Preparatory School
F	18	(Philippines)	Publico, Reynaldo Jr.	6'4" (1.93m)	4th	–

Head coach

- Carlos Jose Garcia

Assistant coach(es)

- Elvis Tolentino
- Ricky Umayam
- Gerard Francisco
- Ronjay Enrile
- Mike Buendia

Legend

- (C) Team captain
- Injured

=== Depth chart ===
Pos.	Starting 5	Bench 1	Bench 2
C	Ruaya	Publico	De La Peña
PF	Gabawan	Saldua	Apreku
SF	Racal	Luib	Singontiko
SG	Tambeling	Nambatac	Castro
PG	Cruz	Calvo	Quinto

== Roster changes ==
The Knights have lost key players in Season 89 MVP Raymond Almazan, who was the third pick in the 2013 PBA Draft, and Jonathan Belorio, who had used up his eligibility. Holdovers were Mark Cruz, Kevin Racal, Rey Nambatac, and McJour Luib. Added to the roster was NCAA Season 88 juniors MVP Bong Quinto, Filipino-American Daryl Singontiko, and spitfire JP Calvo.

== Suspensions ==
- NCAA Management Committee led by Mr. Bai Cristobal suspended Letran head coach Caloy Garcia for one game after Garcia received two technical fouls during the match against JRU Heavy Bombers in the first round of eliminations. Kevin Racal, Jamil Gabawan, Rey Nambatac, and Rey Publico were given a stern warning for crossing over to the game officials prior to the league's 30-minute cooling period.
- Letran point guard Mark Cruz was also suspended on the same day after he charged into the referee.

== Injuries ==
Kevin Racal suffered a torn anterior cruciate ligament (ACL) on his left knee during the team's practice a day before the game against the Arellano Chiefs.

== NCAA Season 90 games results ==
Elimination games were played in a double round-robin format. All games were aired on TV5 & AksyonTV.

Date	Time	Opponent	Venue	Result	Record
First round of eliminations
Jun 28	3:00 p.m.	San Sebastian Stags	Mall of Asia Arena • Pasay	L 83–85	0–1
Jul 4	12:00 p.m.	Lyceum Pirates	Filoil Flying V Arena • San Juan	L 74–70	0–2
Jul 9	4:00 p.m.	Mapúa Cardinals	Filoil Flying V Arena • San Juan	W 79–67	1–2
Jul 14	2:00 p.m.	JRU Heavy Bombers	Filoil Flying V Arena • San Juan	L 60–69	1–3
Jul 21	4:00 p.m.	Benilde Blazers	Filoil Flying V Arena • San Juan	L 71–85	1–4
Jul 30	4:00 p.m.	EAC Generals	Filoil Flying V Arena • San Juan	W 63–61	2–4
Aug 4	2:00 p.m.	Arellano Chiefs	Filoil Flying V Arena • San Juan	L 62–63	2–5
Aug 9	2:30 p.m.	Perpetual Altas	Filoil Flying V Arena • San Juan	L 82–85	2–6
Aug 13	4:00 p.m.	San Beda Red Lions	Filoil Flying V Arena • San Juan	W 64–53	3–6
7th place after the 1st round (3 wins–6 losses)
Second round of eliminations
Aug 22	2:00 p.m.	JRU Heavy Bombers	Filoil Flying V Arena • San Juan	W 84–77	4–6
Aug 27	4:00 p.m.	Perpetual Altas	Filoil Flying V Arena • San Juan	L 64–67	4–7
Sep 3	4:00 p.m.	EAC Generals	Filoil Flying V Arena • San Juan	W 77–70	5–7
Sep 8	2:00 p.m.	San Sebastian Stags	Filoil Flying V Arena • San Juan	W 77–75	6–7
Sep 13	2:30 p.m.	San Beda Red Lions	Filoil Flying V Arena • San Juan	L 44–73	6–8
Sep 24	2:00 p.m.	Arellano Chiefs	Filoil Flying V Arena • San Juan	L 70–79	6–9
Sep 29	11:00 a.m.	Mapúa Cardinals	Filoil Flying V Arena • San Juan	W 20–0 (Note: Mapúa was forced to forfeit due to the suspensions of its players involved in the brawl against EAC in the second round.)	7–9
Oct 3	1:00 p.m.	Lyceum Pirates	Filoil Flying V Arena • San Juan	W 77–52	8–9
Oct 8	2:00 p.m.	Benilde Blazers	Filoil Flying V Arena • San Juan	W 64–57	9–9
6th place at 9 wins–9 losses (6 wins–3 losses in the 2nd round)

Times listed above are in UTC+08:00

Source: PBA-Online
