= 2013 Letran Knights basketball team =

2013 Letran Knights men's basketball

NCAA Season 89 runner-up

Record
- Elims rank: #2
- Final rank: #2
- 2013 record: 14–4 (14–4 elims)
- Head coach: Caloy Garcia (1st season)
- Assistant coaches: Elvis Tolentino; Ricky Umayam; Ronjay Enrile; Gerard Francisco; Mike Buendia
- Captain: Jonathan Belorio (5th season)

The 2013 Letran Knights men's basketball team represented Colegio de San Juan de Letran in the 89th season of the National Collegiate Athletic Association in the Philippines. The men's basketball tournament for the school year 2013-14 began on June 22, 2013, and the host school for the season was De La Salle–College of Saint Benilde.

The Knights finished the double round-robin eliminations at second place with 14 wins against 4 losses. The Knights, holding a twice-to-beat advantage against the San Sebastian Stags, defeated them in one game to arrange a best-of-three Finals series against their Season 88 Finals' tormentors and defending champions San Beda Red Lions. However, the Knights lost again to the Red Lions in three games. Raymond Almazan bagged three individuals awards: NCAA Most Valuable Player, NCAA Defensive Player of the Year, and NCAA Mythical Five member.

== Roster ==
Letran Knights roster
Players
Coaches

Pos.	No.	Nat.	Name	Height	Year	High School
G	4	(Philippines)	Dysam, Franz Dionne (injured)	5'9" (1.75m)	5th	University of Southern Philippines
G	5	(Philippines)	Castro, Fidel Albert	6'1" (1.85m)	1st	Olivares College
G	6	(Philippines)	Po, Jebson Carl	–	1st	Bernardo College
F	7	(Philippines)	Ruaya, Reneford	6'2" (1.88m)	1st	Agusan Institute of Technology
G	8	(Philippines)	Tambeling, John Von Jovi	6'0" (1.83m)	1st	Mantangale National HS
G	9	(Philippines)	Cruz, Mark L.	5'7" (1.7m)	3rd	Colegio de San Juan de Letran
G	10	(Philippines)	Luib, McJour	5'11" (1.8m)	2nd	Colegio de San Juan de Letran
F	12	(Philippines)	Belorio, Jonathan (C)	6'3" (1.91m)	5th	Don Pablo Lorenzo Memorial High School
G	13	(Philippines)	Nambatac, Rey Benedict	5'11" (1.8m)	1st	Colegio de San Juan de Letran
G	14	(Philippines)	Buenaflor, Kevin	–	1st	Southernside Montessori School
F	15	(Philippines)	Gabawan, Jamil Joseph	6'3" (1.91m)	3rd	Balanga National HS
F	16	(Philippines)	Racal, Kevin Kent	6'3" (1.91m)	3rd	Muntinlupa National HS
C	17	(Philippines)	Almazan, Raymond	6'8" (2.03m)	4th	Orion National HS
F	18	(Philippines)	Publico, Reynaldo Jr.	6'4" (1.93m)	3rd	–

Head coach

- Carlos Jose Garcia

Assistant coach(es)

- Elvis Tolentino
- Ricky Umayam
- Gerard Francisco
- Ronjay Enrile
- Mike Buendia

Legend

- (C) Team captain
- Injured

=== Depth chart ===
Pos.	Starting 5	Bench 1	Bench 2
C	Almazan	Ruaya	Olotu
PF	Belorio	Publico	Castro
SF	Racal	Gabawan	Po
SG	Nambatac	Luib	Tambeling
PG	Cruz	Dysam	Buenaflor

== Coaching changes ==
Right after a disappointing loss in Season 88 Finals, long-time head coach Louie Alas announced his resignation as mentor for the Knights citing personal reasons. In January 2013, after a proposed deal with former Letran mentor Larry Albano fell through, Letran officials named then-Rain or Shine Elasto Painters assistant coach Caloy Garcia as the new head coach for the Knights. Caloy Garcia was the former head coach of St. Benilde Blazers in 2005–2007. Garcia then brought his own assistant coaches Elvis Tolentino, Ricky Umayam, and Mike Buendia.

== Roster changes ==
The Knights lost its star player Kevin Alas, foregoing his final year of eligibility, to focus on his duties in the national team. Holdovers were NCAA Defensive player of the Year Raymond Almazan, big man Jonathan Belorio, spitfire Kevin Racal, and diminutive point guard Mark Cruz, who were expected to lead the team. Franz Dysam also returned for his final year. Added to its roster was NCAA Season 87 juniors MVP Rey Nambatac, a product of Letran's high school program.

== Franz Dysam shooting incident ==
On July 20, 2013, after the Knights game against the Lyceum Pirates, Letran point guard Franz Dysam and his girlfriend Joan Sordan, who were on their way to a victory party in Intramuros, were rushed to a hospital after they were shot by motorcycle-riding gunmen. Sordan's son and two nephews were in the car with the couple. Using a .45 caliber gun, the two gunmen fired several times at the driver's side of the car, killing Sordan and leaving Dysam injured. Dysam tried to shield Sordan from the gunmen and was able to bring her to a hospital, but she was hit in the stomach and was declared dead on arrival. Dysam was in a stable condition after he was transferred to UST Hospital.

== NCAA Season 89 games results ==
Elimination games were played in a double round-robin format. All games were aired on AksyonTV.

Date	Time	Opponent	Venue	Result	Record
First round of eliminations
Jun 22	6:00 p.m.	San Sebastian Stags	Mall of Asia Arena • Pasay	W 74–69	1–0
Game Highs: Points: Almazan – 15; Rebounds: Almazan – 20
Jun 29	6:00 p.m.	EAC Generals	Filoil Flying V Arena • San Juan	W 79–74	2–0
Jul 6	6:00 p.m.	JRU Heavy Bombers	Filoil Flying V Arena • San Juan	W 69–66^{OT}	3–0
Jul 13	6:00 p.m.	Benilde Blazers	Filoil Flying V Arena • San Juan	W 71–70	4–0
Jul 20	4:00 p.m.	Lyceum Pirates	Filoil Flying V Arena • San Juan	W 61–53	5–0
Jul 25	4:00 p.m.	Arellano Chiefs	Filoil Flying V Arena • San Juan	W 67–57	6–0
Jul 29	4:00 p.m.	Mapúa Cardinals	Filoil Flying V Arena • San Juan	W 87–68	7–0
Aug 15	4:00 p.m.	Perpetual Altas	Filoil Flying V Arena • San Juan	L 66–80	7–1
Aug 24	6:00 p.m.	San Beda Red Lions	Filoil Flying V Arena • San Juan	W 74–67	8–1
1st place after the 1st round (8 wins–1 loss)
Second round of eliminations
Aug 31	4:00 p.m.	Mapúa Cardinals	Filoil Flying V Arena • San Juan	W 77–70	9–1
Sep 5	6:00 p.m.	Lyceum Pirates	Filoil Flying V Arena • San Juan	L 76–80	9–2
Sep 16	4:00 p.m.	Arellano Chiefs	Filoil Flying V Arena • San Juan	W 70–59	10–2
Sep 21	6:00 p.m.	EAC Generals	Filoil Flying V Arena • San Juan	L 64–87	10–3
Sep 28	4:00 p.m.	JRU Heavy Bombers	Filoil Flying V Arena • San Juan	W 75–50	11–3
Oct 5	6:00 p.m.	Benilde Blazers	Filoil Flying V Arena • San Juan	W 95–89^{OT}	12–3
Oct 10	4:00 p.m.	Perpetual Altas	Filoil Flying V Arena • San Juan	W 74–61	13–3
Oct 12	6:00 p.m.	San Sebastian Stags	Filoil Flying V Arena • San Juan	W 75–68	14–3
Oct 21	6:00 p.m.	San Beda Red Lions	Filoil Flying V Arena • San Juan	L 72–76^{OT}	14–4
2nd place at 14 wins–4 losses (6 wins–3 losses in the 2nd round)
Final Four (Note: Letran held a twice-to-beat advantage over San Sebastian)
Nov 7	12:30 p.m.	San Sebastian Stags	Mall of Asia Arena • Pasay	W 85–58	1–0 (15–4)
Game Highs: Points: Almazan – 19; Rebounds: Almazan – 23; Assists: Cruz – 4
Letran wins series in one game
Finals
Nov 11	2:30 p.m.	San Beda Red Lions	Mall of Asia Arena • Pasay	L 60–62	0–1 (15–5)
Game Highs: Points: Cruz – 22; Rebounds: Almazan – 10; Assists: Cruz – 7
Nov 14	2:30 p.m.	San Beda Red Lions	Mall of Asia Arena • Pasay	W 79–74	1–1 (16–5)
Game Highs: Points: Cruz – 16; Rebounds: Racal – 10; Assists: Cruz – 4
Nov 16	2:00 p.m.	San Beda Red Lions	Mall of Asia Arena • Pasay	L 56–60	1–2 (16–6)
Game Highs: Points: Almazan – 14; Rebounds: Almazan – 11
Lost series in three games

Times listed above are in UTC+08:00

Source: PBA-Online

== Awards ==
Player	Award
Raymond Almazan	NCAA Season Most Valuable Player
Raymond Almazan	NCAA Defensive Player of the Year
Raymond Almazan	NCAA Mythical Five member
