= Onuaku =

Onuaku is a surname. Notable people with the surname include:

- Arinze Onuaku (born 1987), American basketball player
- Chinanu Onuaku (born 1996), American basketball player, brother of Arinze
