= Maverick Ahanmisi =

Filipino-Nigerian basketball player

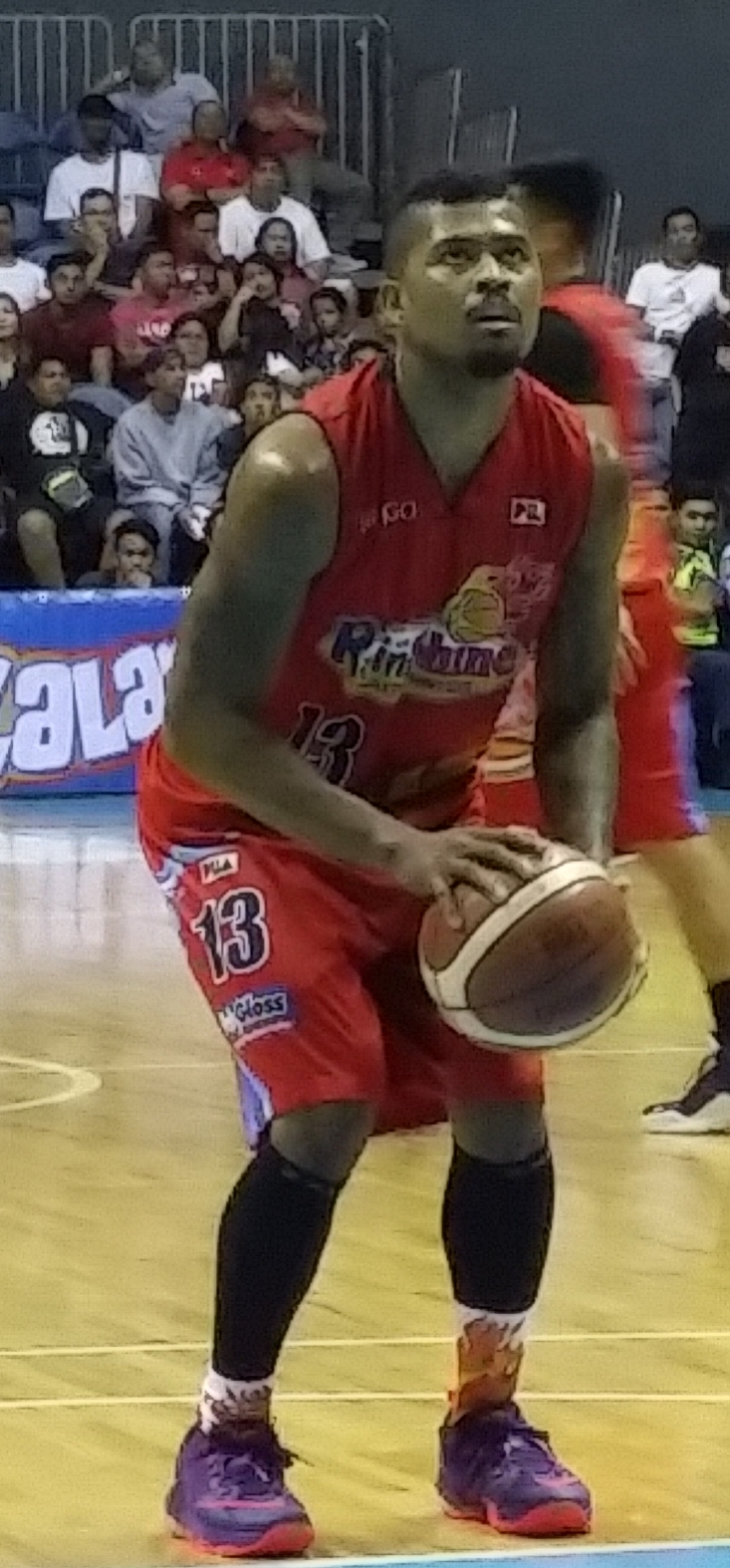
- Ahanmisi with the Rain or Shine Elasto Painters in 2016

No. 13 – Terrafirma Dyip
- Position: Point guard / shooting guard
- League: PBA

Personal information
- Born: July 17, 1991 (age 35) Los Angeles, California, U.S.
- Listed height: 6 ft 2 in (1.88 m)
- Listed weight: 190 lb (86 kg)

Career information
- High school: Stoneridge Prep (Simi Valley, California); Golden Valley (Santa Clarita, California)
- College: Minnesota (2010–2014)
- PBA draft: 2015: 1st round, 3rd overall pick
- Drafted by: Rain or Shine Elasto Painters
- Playing career: 2014–present

Career history
- 2015–2019: Rain or Shine Elasto Painters
- 2019–2022: Alaska Aces
- 2022–2023: Converge FiberXers
- 2023–2025: Barangay Ginebra San Miguel
- 2025–present: Terrafirma Dyip

Career highlights
- PBA champion (2016 Commissioner's); PBA All-Star (2024); PBA All-Rookie Team (2016); 2× PBA All-Star Week Obstacle Challenge champion (2016, 2017); PBA Most Improved Player (2023); PBA D-League champion (2015 Foundation); NIT champion (2014)

Maverick Frankera Ahanmisi (born July 17, 1991) is an American-born Filipino-Nigerian professional basketball player for the Terrafirma Dyip of the Philippine Basketball Association (PBA). He played college basketball for the Minnesota Golden Gophers.

== Early life ==
Maverick Ahanmisi was born to nurses. His father Victor Ahanmisi is Nigerian while his mother Marissa Frankera is a Filipina from Pampanga who emigrated to the United States in her teenage years.

== High school career ==
Ahanmisi spent a year at Stoneridge Prep in Simi Valley, California, but he graduated from Golden Valley High School in Santa Clarita, California in 2009. As a senior, he averaged 20.2 points per game and finished his career as all-time leading scorer and three-point shooter at GVHS. He played AAU basketball at Branch West Basketball Academy under the tutelage of Bob Gottlieb. In 2010, he signed a letter of intent to play for the University of Minnesota.

== College career ==
Ahanmisi played college basketball at University of Minnesota, an NCAA Division I school, from 2010 to 2014, mostly in a reserve role. He's a known sparkplug off the bench and usually leads the team's second unit. He helped the Golden Gophers win the National Invitational Tournament title in 2014. The Gophers are coached by Richard Pitino, son of coach Rick Pitino of Louisville.

In his four years in Minnesota, he averaged 2.8 points, 1 rebound, and 38% field goal average.

== Semi-professional career ==
In 2014, Ahanmisi decided to leave the United States after college and take his basketball career with him in the Philippines, by playing for the Cafe France Bakers in the PBA Developmental League. In his career debut in the Philippines, he made his presence felt right away, scoring 10 points in an 18–0 run in the first quarter that keyed in a win for Cafe France. In the 2015 PBA D-League Foundation Cup eliminations, he led the team in scoring, averaging 13.9 points per game, while also contributing 6.8 rebounds and 4.0 assists per outing. He helped guide Café France to its first ever PBA-D-League championship by ruling the Foundation Cup.

== Professional career ==
=== Rain or Shine Elasto Painters ===
According to the list released by the PBA on August 10, 2015, Ahanmisi was one of the sixteen Fil-Foreigners who applied for the 2015 PBA draft. He was drafted as a 3rd overall pick by the Rain or Shine Elasto Painters in the 2015 PBA draft. He signed a two-year maximum rookie deal with the Elasto Painters. In his first breakout game as a pro against Mahindra on October 25, 2015, he scored 11 of his 14 points in the fourth quarter alone, while leading the Elasto Painters to a 2–0 start in the 2015–16 All-Filipino Cup.

During the duration of the All-Filipino conference, he averaged 8.3 points, 4 rebounds, and 2.3 assists a game, while filling in the void of the injured Paul Lee for the majority of the tournament.

=== Alaska Aces / Converge FiberXers ===
On August 16, 2019, Ahanmisi was traded to Alaska Aces for Chris Exciminiano and 2019 first-round pick.

On June 6, 2022, Ahanmisi signed a one-year contract with the Converge FiberXers, the new team that took over the defunct Alaska Aces franchise. He became an unrestricted free agent on June 7, 2023, as he failed to sign an extension with the FiberXers.

=== Barangay Ginebra San Miguel ===
On September 18, 2023, he signed a three-year maximum contract with the Barangay Ginebra San Miguel.

=== Terrafirma Dyip ===
On October 15, 2025, Ahanmisi, along with Aljon Mariano, was traded to the Terrafirma Dyip in exchange for a 2027 first-round pick.

== PBA career statistics ==
Legend
GP	Games played	MPG	Minutes per game	FG%	Field-goal percentage
3FG%	3-point field-goal percentage	4P%	4-point field-goal percentage	FT%	Free-throw percentage
RPG	Rebounds per game	APG	Assists per game	SPG	Steals per game
BPG	Blocks per game	PPG	Points per game	127	Career high

As of the end of 2025–26 season

=== Season-by-season averages ===
Year	Team	GP	MPG	FG%	3P%	4P%	FT%	RPG	APG	SPG	BPG	PPG
2015–16	Rain or Shine	54	21.5	.412	.350	—	.748	3.9	2.7	.6	.1	8.7
2016–17	Rain or Shine	38	24.4	.418	.275	—	.738	4.4	3.1	1.0	.2	7.4
2017–18	Rain or Shine	39	29.5	.406	.340	—	.619	4.9	3.6	1.4	.3	10.9
2019	Rain or Shine	22	25.7	.390	.310	—	.705	4.9	2.5	1.2	.2	8.5
2019	Alaska	22	25.7	.390	.310	—	.705	4.9	2.5	1.2	.2	8.5
2020	Alaska	9	22.8	.421	.348	—	.700	4.7	2.7	.7	—	7.8
2021	Alaska	23	29.5	.384	.326	—	.609	5.5	3.4	1.2	.1	8.4
2022–23	Converge	36	31.0	.433	.347	—	.706	5.9	3.8	1.2	.1	13.7
2023–24	Barangay Ginebra	34	33.5	.389	.327	—	.740	6.1	3.7	.6	.1	12.7
2024–25	Barangay Ginebra	65	21.4	.442	.364	.091	.774	3.6	1.8	.5	.1	7.5
2025–26	Terrafirma	25	30.1	.445	.363	.143	.784	5.8	6.5	1.0	.2	12.6
Career		345	26.3	.416	.337	.111	.717	4.8	3.2	.9	.1	9.7

== Personal life ==
Ahanmisi comes from a family of diverse ethnicities. His father, Victor Ahanmisi is a Nigerian, while his mother Marissa (née Frankera) is a Filipina, who hails from Alcala, Pangasinan. He has two siblings, Jerrick and Mylenne. Jerrick currently plays for the Terrafirma Dyip in the PBA.
