= PBA Order of Merit =

The Philippine Basketball Association (PBA) Order of Merit is an annual Philippine Basketball Association (PBA) award given since the 2008–09 PBA season to the player who had the most "Best Player of the Week" awards in a season. Unlike the traditional player awards, which is given by the league, this citation is awarded by the PBA Press Corps.

== Winners ==
^	Denotes player who is still active in the PBA
Player (X)	Denotes the number of times the player has received the award
Team (X)	Denotes the number of times a player from this team has won

Season	Player	Position	Country of birth	Team	Ref.
2008–09	Arwind Santos	Small forward / Power forward	Philippines	Burger King Whoppers	
2009–10	Jimmy Alapag	Point guard	United States	Talk 'N Text Tropang Texters	
2010–11	Mark Caguioa	Shooting guard	Philippines	Barangay Ginebra Kings	
2011–12	Jireh Ibañes	Small forward	Philippines	Rain or Shine Elasto Painters	
2012–13	LA Tenorio^	Point guard	Philippines	Barangay Ginebra San Miguel (2)	
2013–14	Mark Barroca^	Point guard	Philippines	San Mig Super Coffee Mixers	
2014–15	Paul Lee^	Point guard / Shooting guard	Philippines	Rain or Shine Elasto Painters (2)	
2015–16	Jayson Castro^	Point guard	Philippines	TNT KaTropa (2)	
2016–17	LA Tenorio^ (2)	Point guard	Philippines	Barangay Ginebra San Miguel (3)	
2017–18	June Mar Fajardo^	Center	Philippines	San Miguel Beermen	
2017–18	Paul Lee^ (2)	Shooting guard	Philippines	Magnolia Hotshots Pambansang Manok (2)	
2017–18	Vic Manuel	Power forward	Philippines	Alaska Aces	
2019	June Mar Fajardo^ (2)	Center	Philippines	San Miguel Beermen (2)	
2021	Robert Bolick^	Point guard / Shooting guard	Philippines	NorthPort Batang Pier	
2021	Ian Sangalang^	Center / Power forward	Philippines	Magnolia Pambansang Manok Hotshots (3)	
2021	Mikey Williams^	Point guard / Shooting guard	United States	TNT Tropang Giga (3)	
2021	Matthew Wright	Shooting guard / Small forward	Canada	Phoenix Super LPG Fuel Masters	
2022–23	Jayson Castro^ (2)	Point guard	Philippines	TNT Tropang Giga (4)	
2023–24	June Mar Fajardo^ (3)	Center	Philippines	San Miguel Beermen (3)	
2024–25	Calvin Oftana^	Small forward	Philippines	TNT Tropang 5G (5)	

== Multiple time winners ==
Total	Player
3	June Mar Fajardo
2	Jayson Castro
2	Paul Lee
2	LA Tenorio
