= 2016 PBA Commissioner's Cup finals =

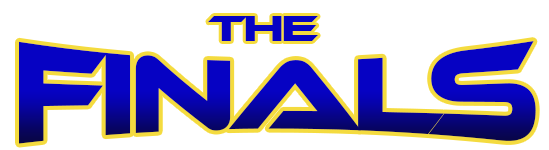
Team	Coach	Wins
(5) Rain or Shine Elasto Painters	Yeng Guiao	4
(3) Alaska Aces	Alex Compton	2
- Dates: May 6–18, 2016
- MVP: Paul Lee (Rain or Shine Elasto Painters)
- Television: Local: Sports5; TV5; AksyonTV; Hyper (HD); Fox Sports; International: AksyonTV International
- Announcers: see Broadcast notes
- Radio network: Radyo5 (DWFM)
- Announcers: see Broadcast notes

Referees
- Game 1: A. Herrera, N. Quilinguen, E. Tangkion, R. Dacanay
- Game 2: A. Herrera, N. Quilingen, E. Aquino, R. Marabe
- Game 3: J. Mariano, J. Oliva, R. Dacanay, M. Montoya
- Game 4: N. Quilinguen, E. Tangkion, R. Dacanay, M. Montoya
- Game 5: N. Quilinguen, J. Mariano, E. Aquino, J. Narandan
- Game 6: N. Quilinguen, J. Mariano, E. Aquino, R. Dacanay

PBA Commissioner's Cup finals chronology
- < 2015 2017 >

PBA finals chronology
- < 2015–16 Philippine 2016 Governors' >

The 2016 Philippine Basketball Association (PBA) Commissioner's Cup finals was the best-of-7 championship series of the 2016 PBA Commissioner's Cup and the conclusion of the conference's playoffs. The Rain or Shine Elasto Painters and the Alaska Aces competed for the 16th Commissioner's Cup championship and the 117th overall championship contested by the league.

This was the first championship series that does not involve any team owned by the San Miguel Corporation or the MVP Group of Companies since the 2000 All-Filipino Cup finals, when the Alaska Milkmen won the championship series against the Purefoods TJ Hotdogs. Purefoods was still then owned by the Ayala Corporation when the finals series was held. This was also the first championship series since the 2004 Fiesta Conference when both the top two teams at the end of the eliminations did not advance to the finals.

== Background ==
=== Road to the finals ===
Rain or Shine Elasto Painters		Alaska Aces
Finished 7–4 (.636): Tied with Alaska and Barangay Ginebra at 3rd place	Elimination round	Finished 7–4 (.636): Tied with Rain or Shine and Barangay Ginebra at 3rd place
0–2 (5th place)	Tiebreaker*	2–0 (3rd place)
def. Barangay Ginebra, 2–0	Quarterfinals	def. TNT, 2–1
def. San Miguel, 3–1	Semifinals	def. Meralco, 3–2

=== Head-to-head matchup ===
February 27

summary

Alaska Aces 128, Rain or Shine Elasto Painters 102

Mall of Asia Arena, Pasay

== Series summary ==
Team	Game 1	Game 2	Game 3	Game 4	Game 5	Game 6	Wins
Rain or Shine	105	105	112	99	78	109	4
Alaska Aces	97	103	108	111	86	92	2
Venue	Araneta	Araneta	Araneta	Araneta	Araneta	Araneta

*overtime

=== Game 1 ===
TV5

May 6
7:00pm

Boxscore

Rain or Shine Elasto Painters 105, Alaska Aces 97
Scoring by quarter: 29–25, 22–21, 23–31, 31–20
Pts: Lee 20; Rebs: Henderson-Niles 13; Asts: Cruz 5	Pts: Dozier 41; Rebs: Dozier 15; Asts: Banchero 4
Rain or Shine lead series, 1–0

Smart Araneta Coliseum, Quezon City
Referees: A. Herrera, N. Quilinguen, E. Tangkion, R. Dacanay

=== Game 2 ===
TV5

May 8
5:00pm

Boxscore

Rain or Shine Elasto Painters 105, Alaska Aces 103
Scoring by quarter: 21–26, 28–25, 27–28, 29–24
Pts: Chan, Lee 17; Rebs: Henderson-Niles 13; Asts: Ibañes, Lee 4	Pts: Jazul 24; Rebs: Dozier 9 Asts: Dozier 5
Rain or Shine lead series, 2–0

Smart Araneta Coliseum, Quezon City
Referees: A. Herrera, N. Quilingen, E. Aquino, R. Marabe

=== Game 3 ===
TV5

May 11
7:00pm

Boxscore

Rain or Shine Elasto Painters 112, Alaska Aces 108
Scoring by quarter: 28–28, 34–19, 33–25, 17–36
Pts: Quiñahan 18; Rebs: Henderson-Niles 13; Asts: Henderson-Niles 5	Pts: Dozier 23; Rebs: Abueva, Dozier 8 Asts: Abueva 6
Rain or Shine lead series, 3–0

Smart Araneta Coliseum, Quezon City
Referees: J. Mariano, J. Oliva, R. Dacanay, M. Montoya

=== Game 4 ===
TV5

May 13
7:00pm

Boxscore

Rain or Shine Elasto Painters 99, Alaska Aces 111
Scoring by quarter: 21–25, 18–29, 28–36, 32–21
Pts: Ahanmisi 30; Rebs: Belga, Quiñahan 6 Asts: Belga 4	Pts: Dozier 23; Rebs: Abueva 10; Asts: Banchero 8
Rain or Shine lead series, 3–1

Smart Araneta Coliseum, Quezon City
Referees: N. Quilinguen, E. Tangkion, R. Dacanay, M. Montoya

=== Game 5 ===
TV5

May 15
5:00pm

Boxscore

Rain or Shine Elasto Painters 78, Alaska Aces 86
Scoring by quarter: 19–15, 21–22, 17–19, 21–30
Pts: Chan 17; Rebs: Henderson-Niles 8 Asts: Ahanmisi 3	Pts: Abueva 20; Rebs: Abueva 13; Asts: Jazul 4
Rain or Shine lead series, 3–2

Smart Araneta Coliseum, Quezon City
Referees: N. Quilinguen, J. Mariano, E. Aquino, J. Narandan

=== Game 6 ===
TV5

May 18
7:00pm

Boxscore

Rain or Shine Elasto Painters 109, Alaska Aces 92
Scoring by quarter: 38–24, 21–25, 25–20, 25–23
Pts: Cruz 21; Rebs: Henderson-Niles 9 Asts: Ahanmisi, Belga 4	Pts: Abueva 26; Rebs: Dozier 13; Asts: Baguio 5
Rain or Shine wins series, 4–2

Smart Araneta Coliseum, Quezon City
Referees: N. Quilinguen, J. Mariano, E. Aquino, R. Dacanay

== Rosters ==
Rain or Shine Elasto Painters roster
Players
Coaches

Pos.	#	POB	Name	Height	Weight	DOB (YYYY–MM–DD)	From
C	1	(United States)	Pierre Henderson-Niles (I)	6 ft 8 in (2.03 m)	270 lb (122 kg)	1987–06–07	Memphis
G	3	(Philippines)	Paul Lee	6 ft 0 in (1.83 m)	200 lb (91 kg)	1989–02–14	UE
G/F	5	(United States)	Gabe Norwood	6 ft 6 in (1.98 m)	210 lb (95 kg)	1985–02–09	George Mason
F	6	(Philippines)	Jireh Ibañes (C)	6 ft 2 in (1.88 m)	182 lb (83 kg)	1982–04–20	Philippines
G	8	(Philippines)	Jeric Teng	6 ft 1 in (1.85 m)	183 lb (83 kg)	1991–03–18	UST
G	9	(Philippines)	Jericho Cruz	6 ft 1 in (1.85 m)	190 lb (86 kg)	1990–10–11	Adamson
G	13	(United States)	Maverick Ahanmisi (R)	6 ft 2 in (1.88 m)	185 lb (84 kg)	1991–07–17	Minnesota
F/C	15	(Philippines)	Jewel Ponferada	6 ft 4 in (1.93 m)	211 lb (96 kg)	1988–07–08	National-U
G/F	16	(Philippines)	Jeffrei Chan	6 ft 2 in (1.88 m)	185 lb (84 kg)	1983–02–11	Far Eastern
G	17	(Philippines)	Chris Tiu	5 ft 11 in (1.80 m)	176 lb (80 kg)	1985–07–15	Ateneo
G/F	19	(Philippines)	Don Trollano (R)	6 ft 3 in (1.91 m)	182 lb (83 kg)	1992–01–07	Adamson
F/C	20	(Philippines)	Raymond Almazan	6 ft 8 in (2.03 m)	194 lb (88 kg)	1989–08–02	Letran
F	23	(Philippines)	Josan Nimes (R)	6 ft 3 in (1.91 m)	175 lb (79 kg)	1991–05–11	Mapúa
F/C	30	(Philippines)	Beau Belga	6 ft 5 in (1.96 m)	235 lb (107 kg)	1986–11–30	Philippine Christian
F	33	(Philippines)	Ronnie Matias (IN)	6 ft 4 in (1.93 m)	180 lb (82 kg)	1983–11–29	Manila
F/C	48	(Philippines)	J.R. Quiñahan	6 ft 6 in (1.98 m)	235 lb (107 kg)	1984–05–08	Visayas

Head coach

- (Philippines) Yeng Guiao

Assistant coach(es)

- (Philippines) Caloy Garcia (1st Assistant)
- (Philippines) Mike Buendia
- (Philippines) Ricky Umayam

Team manager

- (Philippines) Mamerto Mondragon^{[a]}
- (Philippines) Jay Legacion (Assistant)

Legend

- (C) Team captain
- (CI) Commissioner's Cup Import
- (GI) Governors' Cup Import
- (EI) EASL Import
- (DP) Unsigned draft pick
- (FA) Free agent
- (IN) Inactive
- (S) Suspended
- (R) Rookie
- Injured

Roster

- ^{a} also serves as Rain or Shine's board governor.

Alaska Aces roster
Players
Coaches

Pos.	#	POB	Name	Height	Weight	DOB (YYYY–MM–DD)	From
F/C	1	(United States)	Robert Dozier (I)	6 ft 9 in (2.06 m)	215 lb (98 kg)	1985–11–26	Memphis
G	2	(United States)	Chris Banchero	6 ft 1 in (1.85 m)	175 lb (79 kg)	1989–01–24	Seattle Pacific
G/F	3	(Philippines)	Cyrus Baguio	6 ft 2 in (1.88 m)	180 lb (82 kg)	1980–08–19	UST
F	4	(Philippines)	Vic Manuel (injured)	6 ft 4 in (1.93 m)	201 lb (91 kg)	1987–06–18	PSBA
C	7	(Papua New Guinea)	Sonny Thoss	6 ft 7 in (2.01 m)	205 lb (93 kg)	1981–12–07	James Cook
F	8	(Philippines)	Calvin Abueva	6 ft 2 in (1.88 m)	185 lb (84 kg)	1988–02–04	San Sebastian
F/C	9	(Philippines)	Noy Baclao	6 ft 5 in (1.96 m)	190 lb (86 kg)	1987–06–15	Ateneo
F/C	10	(Philippines)	Marion Magat (R / IN)	6 ft 7 in (2.01 m)	180 lb (82 kg)	1989–10–22	National-U
G/F	11	(United States)	Rome dela Rosa	6 ft 3 in (1.91 m)	185 lb (84 kg)	1990–12–11	San Beda
G	17	(Philippines)	Chris Exciminiano	5 ft 11 in (1.80 m)	185 lb (84 kg)	1988–11–17	Far Eastern
F	21	(United States)	Josh Vanlandingham (IN)	6 ft 4 in (1.93 m)	205 lb (93 kg)	1984–01–22	Pacific Lutheran
G/F	25	(Philippines)	Dondon Hontiveros	6 ft 2 in (1.88 m)	175 lb (79 kg)	1977–06–01	Cebu
C	26	(Philippines)	Samigue Eman	6 ft 9 in (2.06 m)	239 lb (108 kg)	1982–03–12	Mindanao
F/C	30	(United States)	Eric Menk	6 ft 6 in (1.98 m)	220 lb (100 kg)	1974–08–24	Lake Superior State
G	31	(Philippines)	R.J. Jazul	5 ft 10 in (1.78 m)	170 lb (77 kg)	1986–04–11	Letran
F	35	(United States)	Tony dela Cruz (C)	6 ft 5 in (1.96 m)	209 lb (95 kg)	1978–08–24	UC Irvine
G	42	(Philippines)	JVee Casio (injured)	5 ft 10 in (1.78 m)	175 lb (79 kg)	1986–09–01	De La Salle
G/F	61	(Philippines)	Kevin Racal (R)	6 ft 3 in (1.91 m)	175 lb (79 kg)	1991–05–16	Letran

Head coach

- (Philippines) Alex Compton

Assistant coach(es)

- (Philippines) Louie Alas (1st Assistant)
- (Philippines) Topex Robinson
- (United States) Jeffrey Cariaso
- (Philippines) Monch Gavieres
- (Philippines) Franco Atienza
- (Philippines) Paulo Layug

Team manager

- (Philippines) Dickie Bachmann^{[a]}

Legend

- (C) Team captain
- (CI) Commissioner's Cup Import
- (GI) Governors' Cup Import
- (EI) EASL Import
- (DP) Unsigned draft pick
- (FA) Free agent
- (IN) Inactive
- (S) Suspended
- (R) Rookie
- Injured

Roster

- ^{a} also serves as Alaska's board governor.

== Broadcast notes ==
The Commissioner's Cup finals will be aired on TV5 with simulcast on Hyper (both in standard and high definition). TV5's radio arm, Radyo5 will provide the radio play-by-play coverage. Fox Sports Asia airs the games as well on a delayed basis.

Sports5 will also provide online livestreaming via their official YouTube account using the TV5 feed.

The Hyper/Cignal TV broadcast will provide English-language coverage of the finals.

Game	Sports5			Cignal TV/Hyper (English)	
Game	Play-by-play	Analyst(s)	Courtside reporters	Play-by-play	Analyst(s)
Game 1	Magoo Marjon	Andy Jao and Tab Baldwin	Rizza Diaz	James Velasquez	Vince Hizon
Game 2	Charlie Cuna	Ryan Gregorio and Tab Baldwin	Carla Lizardo	Sev Sarmenta	Charles Tiu
Game 3	Magoo Marjon	Quinito Henson and Tab Baldwin	Apple David	Aaron Atayde	Ali Peek
Game 4	Charlie Cuna	Andy Jao and Norman Black	Sel Guevara	Magoo Marjon	Don Allado
Game 5	Sev Sarmenta	Ryan Gregorio and Dominic Uy	Erika Padilla	Magoo Marjon	Ali Peek
Game 6	Charlie Cuna	Quinito Henson and Ryan Gregorio	Rizza Diaz	Sev Sarmenta	Don Allado

- Additional Game 6 crew:
  - Trophy presentation: James Velazquez
  - Dugout celebration interviewer: Apple David
