= Pierre Henderson-Niles =

American basketball player (born 1987)

Personal information
- Born: June 7, 1987 (age 39)
- Listed height: 6 ft 8 in (2.03 m)
- Listed weight: 270 lb (122 kg)

Career information
- High school: The Patterson School (North Carolina)
- College: Memphis
- NBA draft: 2007: undrafted
- Playing career: 2010–2017
- Position: Power forward / Center
- Number: 1

Career history
- 2010—2011: Toros de Aragua
- 2011—2012: Guangzhou Free Man
- 2014—2016: Iowa Wolves
- 2015: Island Storm
- 2016: Rain or Shine Elasto Painters
- 2017: Stapac Jakarta

Career highlights
- PBA champion (2016 Commissioner's)

Jartavious Pierre Henderson-Niles is an American former professional basketball player.

== Playing career ==
=== College ===
Henderson Niles played for Memphis Tigers in college under John Calipari.

=== Professional ===
==== Venezuela ====
Henderson Niles played for Toros de Aragua in Venezuela. He also played for Japan and Chinese Leagues

==== G-League ====
He played for Iowa Wolves in the NBA G-League.

==== Canada ====
He played for Island Storm of the National Basketball League.

==== PBA stint ====
He played as an import for Rain or Shine Elasto Painters for the 2016 PBA Commissioner's Cup, and while playing for them, he became a low-scoring import only averaging 9 points per game. He led the team to win the title by defeating Alaska Aces in six games.

==== Indonesia ====
He played for Stapac Jakarta in Indonesian Basketball League.
