= 2016 PBA Commissioner's Cup =

- Duration: February 10 – May 18, 2016
- TV partner(s): Local: Sports5; TV5; Fox Sports; Cignal PPV (HD); Hyper (HD); International: AksyonTV International

Finals
- Champions: Rain or Shine Elasto Painters
- Runners-up: Alaska Aces

Awards
- Best Player: Calvin Abueva (Alaska Aces)
- Best Import: Arinze Onuaku (Meralco Bolts)
- Finals MVP: Paul Lee (Rain or Shine Elasto Painters)

PBA Commissioner's Cup chronology
- < 2015 2017 >

PBA conference chronology
- < 2015–16 Philippine 2016 Governors' >

The 2016 Philippine Basketball Association (PBA) Commissioner's Cup, also known as the 2016 Oppo-PBA Commissioner's Cup for sponsorship reasons, was the second conference of the 2015–16 PBA season. The tournament allowed teams to hire foreign players or imports with a height limit of 6'9" for the top eight teams of the 2015–16 PBA Philippine Cup, while the bottom four teams were allowed to hire imports with no height limit.

== Format ==
Due to the preparations of the Philippines men's national basketball team for the upcoming 2016 FIBA World Olympic Qualifying Tournament, the opening of Governors' Cup was moved at the conclusion of the FIBA tournament.

The following format was observed for the duration of the conference:

- Single-round robin eliminations; 11 games per team; Teams are then seeded by basis on win–loss records.
- Top eight teams will advance to the quarterfinals. In case of tie, playoff games will be held only for the #2 and #8 seeds.
- Quarterfinals:
  - QF1: #1 vs #8 (#1 twice-to-beat)
  - QF2: #2 vs #7 (#2 twice-to-beat)
  - QF3: #3 vs #6 (best-of-3 series)
  - QF4: #4 vs #5 (best-of-3 series)
- Semifinals (best-of-5 series):
  - SF1: QF1 Winner vs. QF4 Winner
  - SF2: QF2 Winner vs. QF3 Winner
- Finals (best-of-7 series)
  - F1: SF1 Winner vs SF2 Winner

== Elimination round ==
=== Team standings ===
Pos	Team	W	L	PCT	GB	Qualification
1	San Miguel Beermen	8	3	.727 (Note: Head-to-head record: San Miguel 1–0 Meralco)	—	Twice-to-beat in the quarterfinals
2	Meralco Bolts	8	3	.727	—	Twice-to-beat in the quarterfinals
3	Alaska Aces	7	4	.636 (Note: Head-to-head quotient: Alaska 1.18, Barangay Ginebra 1.03, Rain or Shine 0.84)	1	Best-of-three quarterfinals
4	Barangay Ginebra San Miguel	7	4	.636	1	Best-of-three quarterfinals
5	Rain or Shine Elasto Painters	7	4	.636	1	Best-of-three quarterfinals
6	Tropang TNT	6	5	.545	2	Best-of-three quarterfinals
7	NLEX Road Warriors	5	6	.455 (Note: Head-to-head record: NLEX 1–0 Star)	3	Twice-to-win in the quarterfinals
8	Star Hotshots	5	6	.455	3	Twice-to-win in the quarterfinals
9	Mahindra Enforcer	4	7	.364	4	
10	Blackwater Elite	3	8	.273 (Note: Head-to-head quotient: Blackwater 1.04, Phoenix 0.99, GlobalPort 0.98)	5	
11	Phoenix Fuel Masters	3	8	.273	5	
12	GlobalPort Batang Pier	3	8	.273	5	

Source: PBA.ph

=== Schedule ===
Team ╲ Game	1	2	3	4	5	6	7	8	9	10	11
Alaska Aces	BWE	TNT	ROS	PHX	BGSM	GP	SMB	MAH	SH	MER	NLEX
Barangay Ginebra San Miguel	NLEX	GP	ROS	SH	MAH	ALA	BWE	PHX	TNT	SMB	MER
Blackwater Elite	TNT	MAH	ALA	SH	SMB	GP	BGSM	MER	NLEX	PHX	ROS
GlobalPort Batang Pier	MAH	BGSM	TNT	SMB	MER	BWE	ALA	SH	NLEX	ROS	PHX
Mahindra Enforcer	GP	BWE	SMB	NLEX	BGSM	PHX	ROS	ALA	MER	TNT	SH
Meralco Bolts	SH	TNT	ROS	PHX	GP	SMB	NLEX	BWE	MAH	ALA	BGSM
NLEX Road Warriors	BGSM	PHX	SH	MAH	ROS	MER	TNT	BWE	GP	SMB	ALA
Phoenix Fuel Masters	NLEX	MER	TNT	ALA	MAH	SH	BGSM	BWE	ROS	GP	SMB
Rain or Shine Elasto Painters	SH	MER	BGSM	ALA	NLEX	SMB	MAH	TNT	PHX	GP	BWE
San Miguel Beermen	MAH	GP	BWE	MER	ROS	ALA	SH	BGSM	NLEX	PHX	TNT
Star Hotshots	MER	ROS	NLEX	BWE	BGSM	TNT	PHX	GP	SMB	ALA	MAH
Tropang TNT	BWE	MER	GP	ALA	PHX	SH	NLEX	ROS	BGSM	MAH	SMB

= Win; = OT win; = Loss; = OT loss

=== Results ===
Team	ALA	BGSM	BWE	GP	MAH	MER	NLEX	PHX	ROS	SMB	SH	TNT
Alaska		86–80	101–107	103–101	94–102	101–107	104–98	105–89	128–102	96–116	100–92	108–100
Barangay Ginebra	—		89–79	85–89	104–86	103–90	112–114*	102–101	103–92	110–84	92–87	92–107
Blackwater	—	—		115–103	110–102	83–106	75–88	120–124*	107–118	96–108	103–122	102–108
GlobalPort	—	—	—		98–111	88–96	105–110	125–118	94–116	109–120	100–127	108–101
Mahindra	—	—	—	—		86–94	106–99	99–114	98–103	102–96	73–86	78–83
Meralco	—	—	—	—	—		99–104	90–87	98–95	86–94	90–86	88–84
NLEX	—	—	—	—	—	—		106–118	94–121	127–131***	106–99	80–85
Phoenix	—	—	—	—	—	—	—		104–109	109–121	75–91	96–108
Rain or Shine	—	—	—	—	—	—	—	—		108–105	95–86	103–114
San Miguel	—	—	—	—	—	—	—	—	—		117–98	104–98
Star	—	—	—	—	—	—	—	—	—	—		96–88
TNT	—	—	—	—	—	—	—	—	—	—	—	

Legend: Blue = left column team win; Red = top row team win.
Matches with lighter background shading were decided after overtime.

== Bracket ==
Quarterfinals
(#1 twice-to-beat)
1	San Miguel	99	103
8	Star	108	99
(Best-of-3)
4	Barangay Ginebra	0
5	Rain or Shine	2
(#2 twice-to-beat)
2	Meralco	104
7	NLEX	97
(Best-of-3)
3	Alaska	2
6	TNT	1

Semifinals (Best-of-5)
1	San Miguel	1
5	Rain or Shine	3
2	Meralco	2
3	Alaska	3

Finals (Best-of-7)
5	Rain or Shine	4
3	Alaska	2

== Quarterfinals ==
=== (1) San Miguel vs. (8) Star ===
April 18

Stats

San Miguel Beermen 99, Star Hotshots 108
Scoring by quarter: 26–20, 27–22, 22–32, 24–34
Pts: Fajardo 24; Rebs: Wilkerson 14; Asts: Cabagnot 5	Pts: Ratliffe 33; Rebs: Ratliffe 29; Asts: Barroca 3

Smart Araneta Coliseum, Quezon City
Referees: A. Herrera, S. Pineda, R. Dacanay, J. Oliva

April 20

Stats

San Miguel Beermen 103, Star Hotshots 99
Scoring by quarter: 21–29, 31–25, 26–33, 25–12
Pts: Wilkerson 46; Rebs: Wilkerson 17; Asts: Ross 5	Pts: Ratliffe 24; Rebs: Ratliffe 16; Asts: Barroca 3
San Miguel wins series in two games

Smart Araneta Coliseum, Quezon City
Referees: N. Guevarra, R. Marabe, J. Oliva, M. Flordeliza

=== (2) Meralco vs. (7) NLEX ===
April 18

Stats

Meralco Bolts 104, NLEX Road Warriors 97
Scoring by quarter: 19–22, 19–21, 32–28, 34–26
Pts: Hugnatan 20; Rebs: Onuaku 11; Asts: Alapag, Newsome 4	Pts: Thornton 38; Rebs: Thornton 14; Asts: Thornton 4
Meralco wins series in one game

Smart Araneta Coliseum, Quezon City
Referees: N. Quilinguen, E. Tangkion, M. Montoya, M. Flordeliza

=== (3) Alaska vs. (6) TNT ===
April 17

Boxscore

Alaska Aces 99, Tropang TNT 106
Scoring by quarter: 27–27, 17–30, 28–24, 27–25
Pts: Dozier 22; Rebs: Abueva, Thoss 8 Asts: Abueva, Dozier 4	Pts: Rosario 31; Rebs: Simon 14; Asts: Castro 12

Cuneta Astrodome, Pasay
Referees: P. Balao, N. Guevarra, S. Pineda, R. Yante

April 19

Boxscore

Alaska Aces 85, Tropang TNT 81
Scoring by quarter: 20–16, 20–22, 27–25, 18–18
Pts: Dozier 18; Rebs: Dozier 10; Asts: Baguio 6	Pts: Simon 31; Rebs: Simon 15; Asts: Castro 11

Smart Araneta Coliseum, Quezon City
Referees: N. Quilinguen, P. Balao, E. Tangkion, J. Narandan

April 22

Boxscore

Alaska Aces 99, Tropang TNT 81
Scoring by quarter: 21–21, 32–16, 24–20, 22–24
Pts: Dozier 20; Rebs: Dozier 14; Asts: Jazul 6	Pts: Simon 20; Rebs: Simon 13; Asts: Castro 6
Alaska wins series, 2–1

Smart Araneta Coliseum, Quezon City
Referees: A. Herrera, S. Pineda, R. Gruta, R. Dacanay

=== (4) Barangay Ginebra vs. (5) Rain or Shine ===
April 17

Boxscore

Barangay Ginebra San Miguel 84, Rain or Shine Elasto Painters 88
Scoring by quarter: 27–12, 14–28, 29–30, 14–18
Pts: Tenorio 20; Rebs: Aguilar 12; Asts: Aguilar, Jeffers 3	Pts: Quiñahan 17; Rebs: Henderson-Niles 10; Asts: Tiu 4

Cuneta Astrodome, Pasay
Referees: N. Quilingen, J. Mariano, E. Aquino, J. Narandan

April 19

Boxscore

Barangay Ginebra San Miguel 89, Rain or Shine Elasto Painters 102
Scoring by quarter: 21–31, 23–19, 20–27, 25–25
Pts: Jeffers 27; Rebs: Jeffers 14; Asts: Jeffers 6	Pts: Chan 22; Rebs: Henderson-Niles 14; Asts: Ahanmisi, Belga 4
Rain or Shine wins series, 2–0

Smart Araneta Coliseum, Quezon City
Referees: A. Herrera, J. Mariano, R. Yante, M. Montoya

== Semifinals ==
=== (1) San Miguel vs. (5) Rain or Shine ===
April 24

Boxscore

San Miguel Beermen 94, Rain or Shine Elasto Painters 98
Scoring by quarter: 33–17, 17–23, 25–32, 19–26
Pts: Wilkerson 40; Rebs: Fajardo 13; Asts: Santos 4	Pts: Ahanmisi 23; Rebs: Ahanmisi, Henderson-Niles 9 Asts: Ahanmisi 4

Smart Araneta Coliseum, Quezon City
Referees: A. Herrera, J. Mariano, J. Oliva, R. Dacanay

April 26

Boxscore

San Miguel Beermen 96, Rain or Shine Elasto Painters 98
Scoring by quarter: 28–21, 18–24, 20–24, 30–29
Pts: Wilkerson 35; Rebs: Wilkerson 18; Asts: Ross 7	Pts: Cruz 16; Rebs: Henderson-Niles 16; Asts: Ahanmisi 5

Smart Araneta Coliseum, Quezon City
Referees: N. Quilinguen, R. Dacanay, M. Montoya, G. Narandan

April 28

Boxscore

San Miguel Beermen 104, Rain or Shine Elasto Painters 98
Scoring by quarter: 27–31, 24–22, 29–17, 24–28
Pts: Lassiter 30; Rebs: Fajardo 9 Asts: Ross 12	Pts: Cruz 25; Rebs: Henderson-Niles 11; Asts: Ahanmisi 6

PhilSports Arena, Pasig
Referees: E. Aquino, E. Tangkion, R. Dacanay, J. Narandan

May 1

Boxscore

San Miguel Beermen 99, Rain or Shine Elasto Painters 124
Scoring by quarter: 22–23, 20–38, 28–31, 29–32
Pts: Reid 25; Rebs: Reid 17; Asts: Cabagnot 8	Pts: Lee 18; Rebs: Henderson-Niles 14; Asts: Lee 5
Rain or Shine wins series, 3–1

Smart Araneta Coliseum, Quezon City
Referees: J. Mariano, R. Marabe, J. Oliva, M. Montoya

=== (2) Meralco vs. (3) Alaska ===
April 25

Boxscore

Meralco Bolts 94, Alaska Aces 97
Scoring by quarter: 23–26, 25–17, 31–28, 15–26
Pts: Hugnatan 21; Rebs: Onuaku 18; Asts: Hugnatan 4	Pts: Jazul 18; Rebs: Dozier 8 Asts: Abueva, Banchero 3

Smart Araneta Coliseum, Quezon City
Referees: N. Quilinguen, R. Marabe, E. Aquino, E. Tangkion

April 27

Boxscore

Meralco Bolts 92, Alaska Aces 87
Scoring by quarter: 14–17, 23–27, 24–26, 31–17
Pts: Onuaku 22; Rebs: Onuaku 14; Asts: Alapag 8	Pts: Dozier 28; Rebs: Dozier 10; Asts: Baguio 4

Smart Araneta Coliseum, Quezon City
Referees: A. Herrera, J. Mariano, E. Aquino, E. Tangkion

April 29

Boxscore

Meralco Bolts 72, Alaska Aces 92
Scoring by quarter: 20–15, 18–23, 16–28, 18–26
Pts: Onuaku 16; Rebs: Onuaku 12; Asts: Alapag 4	Pts: Dozier 25; Rebs: Dozier 14; Asts: Baguio 6

Smart Araneta Coliseum, Quezon City
Referees: N. Quilinguen, P. Balao, J. Oliva, M. Montoya

May 2

Boxscore

Meralco Bolts 86, Alaska Aces 70
Scoring by quarter: 19–16, 17–18, 26–18, 24–18
Pts: Dillinger 17; Rebs: Onuaku 16; Asts: Newsome 6	Pts: Dozier 18; Rebs: Dozier 15; Asts: Jazul 3

Smart Araneta Coliseum, Quezon City
Referees: A. Herrera, N. Quilinguen, E. Tangkion, R. Dacanay

May 4

Boxscore

Meralco Bolts 70, Alaska Aces 76
Scoring by quarter: 22–22, 17–15, 11–19, 20–20
Pts: Dillinger 18; Rebs: Onuaku 18; Asts: Hodge 5	Pts: Abueva 19; Rebs: Dozier 18; Asts: Banchero 4
Alaska wins series, 3–2

Smart Araneta Coliseum, Quezon City
Referees: N. Quilinguen, R. Dacanay, J. Oliva, M. Montoya

== Finals ==
TV5

May 6
7:00pm

Boxscore

Alaska Aces 97, Rain or Shine Elasto Painters 105

Smart Araneta Coliseum, Quezon City

TV5

May 8
5:00pm

Boxscore

Alaska Aces 103, Rain or Shine Elasto Painters 105

Smart Araneta Coliseum, Quezon City

TV5

May 11
7:00pm

Boxscore

Alaska Aces 108, Rain or Shine Elasto Painters 112

Smart Araneta Coliseum, Quezon City

TV5

May 13
7:00pm

Boxscore

Alaska Aces 111, Rain or Shine Elasto Painters 99

Smart Araneta Coliseum, Quezon City

TV5

May 15
5:00pm

Boxscore

Alaska Aces 86, Rain or Shine Elasto Painters 78

Smart Araneta Coliseum, Quezon City

TV5

May 18
7:00pm

Boxscore

Alaska Aces 92, Rain or Shine Elasto Painters 109
Rain or Shine wins series, 4–2

Smart Araneta Coliseum, Quezon City

== Imports ==
The following is the list of imports, which had played for their respective teams at least once, with the returning imports in italics. Highlighted are the imports who stayed with their respective teams for the whole conference.

Team	Name	Debuted	Last game	Record
Alaska Aces	No Import	February 19 (vs. Blackwater)		0–1
Alaska Aces	Shane Edwards	February 24 (vs. TNT)	April 8 (vs. Meralco)	6–3
Alaska Aces	Robert Dozier	April 15 (vs. NLEX)	May 18 (vs. Rain or Shine)	8–7
Barangay Ginebra San Miguel	Othyus Jeffers	February 12 (vs. NLEX)	April 19 (vs. Rain or Shine)	7–6
Blackwater Elite	M. J. Rhett	February 10 (vs. TNT)	April 10 (vs. Rain or Shine)	3–8
GlobalPort Batang Pier	Brian Williams	February 12 (vs. Mahindra)	February 14 (vs. Ginebra)	1–1
GlobalPort Batang Pier	Calvin Warner	February 19 (vs. TNT)	March 6 (vs. Blackwater)	1–3
GlobalPort Batang Pier	Shawn Taggart	March 12 (vs. Alaska)	April 8 (vs. Phoenix)	1−4
Mahindra Enforcer	Augustus Gilchrist	February 12 (vs. GlobalPort)	April 13 (vs. Star)	4–7
Meralco Bolts	Arinze Onuaku	February 10 (vs. Star)	May 4 (vs. Alaska)	11–6
NLEX Road Warriors	Al Thornton	February 12 (vs. Ginebra)	April 18 (vs. Meralco)	5–7
Phoenix Fuel Masters	Kenny Adeleke	February 17 (vs. NLEX)	February 21 (vs. Meralco)	1–1
Phoenix Fuel Masters	Kevinn Pinkney	February 27 (vs. TNT)	April 10 (vs. San Miguel)	2−7
Rain or Shine Elasto Painters	Wayne Chism	February 13 (vs. Star)	February 17 (vs. Meralco)	1–1
Rain or Shine Elasto Painters	Antoine Wright	February 21 (vs. Ginebra)	March 4 (vs. NLEX)	1–2
Rain or Shine Elasto Painters	Mo Charlo	March 11 (vs. San Miguel)	April 5 (vs. GlobalPort)	4−1
Rain or Shine Elasto Painters	Pierre Henderson-Niles	April 10 (vs. Blackwater)	May 18 (vs. Alaska)	10–3
San Miguel Beermen	Tyler Wilkerson	February 20 (vs. Mahindra)	April 26 (vs. Rain or Shine)	9–6
San Miguel Beermen	No Import	April 28 (vs. Rain or Shine)		1–0
San Miguel Beermen	Arizona Reid	May 1 (vs. Rain or Shine)	May 1 (vs. Rain or Shine)	0–1
Star Hotshots	Denzel Bowles	February 10 (vs. Meralco)	February 28 (vs. Ginebra)	1–4
Star Hotshots	Ricardo Ratliffe	March 6 (vs. TNT)	April 20 (vs. San Miguel)	5–3
Tropang TNT	No Import	February 10 (vs. Blackwater), February 19 (vs. GlobalPort)		1–1
Tropang TNT	Ivan Johnson	February 13 (vs. Meralco)	February 13 (vs. Meralco)	0–1
Tropang TNT	David Simon	February 24 (vs. Alaska)	April 22 (vs. Alaska)	6–5

=== Import handicapping ===
Team	Philippine Cup standings			Import height limit
Team	W	L	%	Import height limit
Alaska Aces	9	2	.818	6'9"
San Miguel Beermen	9	2	.818	6'9"
Rain or Shine Elasto Painters	8	3	.727	6'9"
Barangay Ginebra San Miguel	7	4	.636	6'9"
GlobalPort Batang Pier	7	4	.636	6'9"
TNT Tropang Texters	6	5	.545	6'9"
NLEX Road Warriors	5	6	.455	6'9"
Barako Bull / Phoenix	5	6	.455	6'9"
Star Hotshots	4	7	.364	unlimited
Blackwater Elite	3	8	.273	unlimited
Mahindra Enforcer	2	9	.182	unlimited
Meralco Bolts	1	10	.091	unlimited

== Awards ==
=== Conference ===
- Best Player of the Conference: Calvin Abueva (Alaska Aces)
- Bobby Parks Best Import of the Conference: Arinze Onuaku (Meralco Bolts)
- Finals MVP: Paul Lee (Rain or Shine Elasto Painters)

=== Players of the Week ===
Week	Player	Ref.
February 10–14	Terrence Romeo (GlobalPort Batang Pier)	
February 15–21	Jared Dillinger (Meralco Bolts)	
February 22–28	Calvin Abueva (Alaska Aces)	
February 29 – March 6	Allein Maliksi (Star Hotshots)	
March 7–13	Calvin Abueva (Alaska Aces)	
March 14–20	Chris Ross (San Miguel Beermen)	
March 21–27	Aldrech Ramos (Mahindra Enforcer)	
March 30 – April 3	Calvin Abueva (Alaska Aces)	
April 4–10	Jeffrei Chan (Rain or Shine Elasto Painters)	
April 11–17	Troy Rosario (Tropang TNT)	
April 18–24	Maverick Ahanmisi (Rain or Shine Elasto Painters)	
April 25 – May 2	Paul Lee (Rain or Shine Elasto Painters)	
