= Josan Nimes =

Filipino basketball player

Personal information
- Born: May 11, 1991 (age 35) Talavera, Nueva Ecija, Philippines
- Listed height: 6 ft 3 in (1.91 m)
- Listed weight: 175 lb (79 kg)

Career information
- High school: Westview High School (Avondale, Arizona)
- College: Mapúa
- PBA draft: 2015: 1st round, 12th overall pick
- Drafted by: Rain or Shine Elasto Painters
- Playing career: 2015–present
- Position: Shooting guard / Small forward

Career history
- 2015–2016: Rain or Shine Elasto Painters
- 2016–2017: Mahindra Floodbuster / Kia Picanto
- 2018–2019: Mandaluyong El Tigre
- 2019–2023: Pasig City Sta. Lucia Realtors / Pasig City / MCW Sports
- 2024: Biñan Tatak Gel
- 2024: Quezon City Toda Aksyon
- 2025: Pasig City

Career highlights
- PBA champion (2016 Commissioner's); NCAA Philippines Rookie of the Year (2011)

Josan Michael C. Nimes (born May 11, 1991) is a Filipino professional basketball player who last played for the Pasig City of the Maharlika Pilipinas Basketball League (MPBL).

== Early life ==
Nimes was born in Talavera, Nueva Ecija in the Philippines to Filipino parents and is the only boy among four siblings. At age four, his family moved to Australia and stayed there until he reached 15 years old. During his time in Australia he attended Good Shepherd Primary in Plumpton, Sydney and later attended Parramatta Marist High School in Westmead, Sydney where he played for the schools A-grade team as the unanimous super star athlete. Then, they moved to Phoenix, Arizona, where he spent his high school years. He came back to the Philippines when he was 19 years old.

== College career ==
Nimes studied at the Mapua Institute of Technology and first played for the Mapua Cardinals in 2011 as a rookie. In his rookie season, he averaged 15.8 points and 4.7 rebounds that earned him the Rookie of the Year honors. He missed full two seasons in 2013 and 2014 due to back problems and an anterior cruciate ligament (ACL) injury on his left knee. He has since returned to action in 2015 while attempting to lead the Cardinals in his final collegiate year.

== Amateur career ==
While in the amateur ranks, Nimes suited up for the Cafe France Bakers in the PBA D-League.

== Professional career ==
On August 23, 2015, Nimes was drafted 12th overall by the Rain or Shine Elasto Painters in the 2015 PBA draft.

== PBA career statistics ==
Legend
| GP | Games played | MPG | Minutes per game |
| FG% | Field-goal percentage | 3P% | 3-point field-goal percentage | FT% | Free-throw percentage |
| RPG | Rebounds per game | APG | Assists per game | SPG | Steals per game |
| BPG | Blocks per game | PPG | Points per game | **Bold** | Career high |

As of the end of 2016–17 season

=== Season-by-season averages ===
| Year | Team | GP | MPG | FG% | 3P% | FT% | RPG | APG | SPG | BPG | PPG |
|---|---|---|---|---|---|---|---|---|---|---|---|
| 2015–16 | Rain or Shine | **24** | 8.0 | .325 | **.286** | .533 | 1.4 | .8 | **.1** | **.0** | 1.6 |
| 2016–17 | Columbian | 17 | **10.6** | **.432** | .250 | **1.000** | **1.5** | **1.1** | **.1** | **.0** | **2.5** |
