= Kevin Racal =

Filipino basketball player

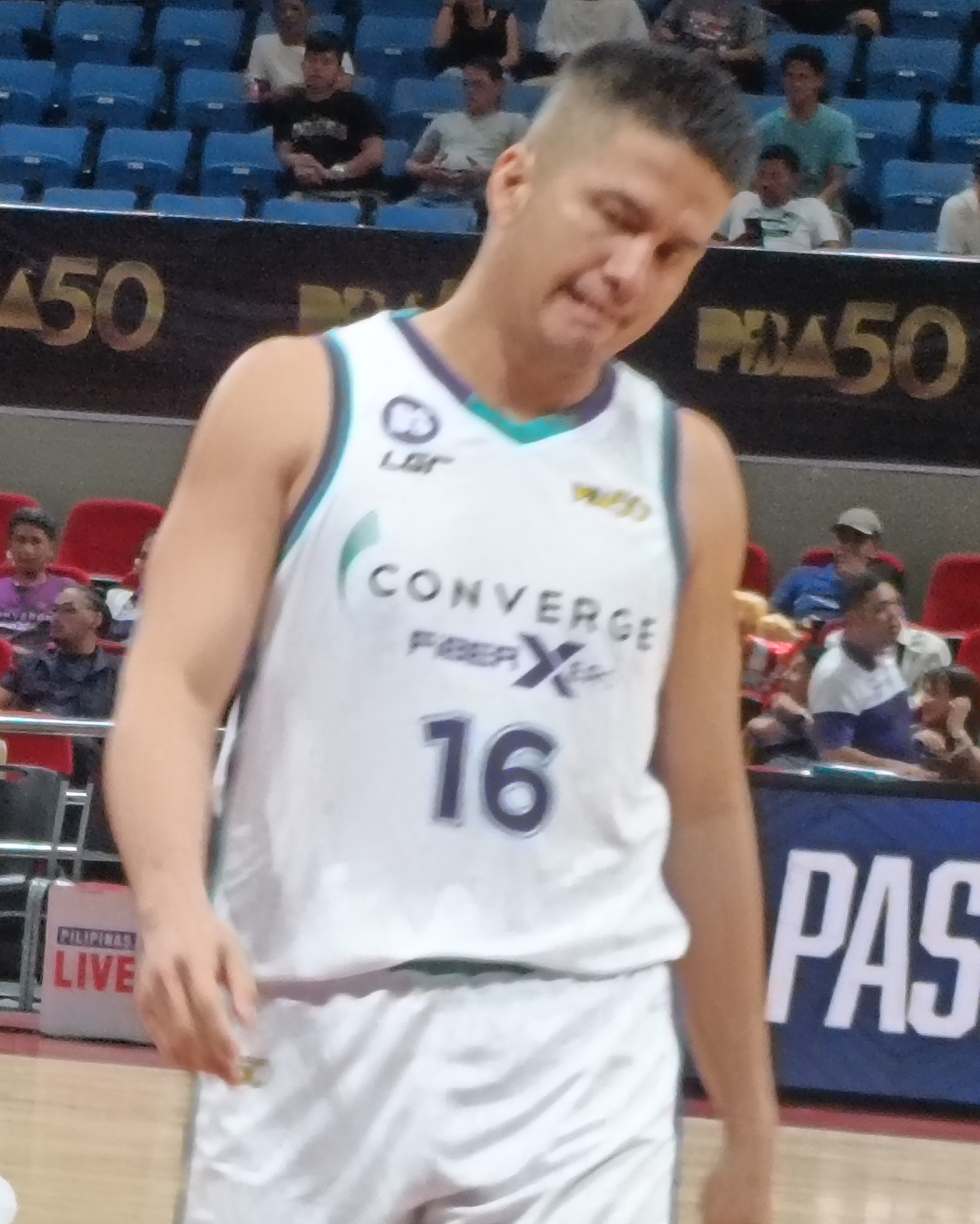
- Racal in 2025

No. 16 – NLEX Road Warriors
- Position: Small forward
- League: PBA

Personal information
- Born: May 16, 1991 (age 35) Mandaluyong, Philippines
- Listed height: 6 ft 3 in (1.91 m)
- Listed weight: 175 lb (79 kg)

Career information
- High school: Muntinlupa National (Muntinlupa)
- College: PLMun (2008–2010); Letran (2011–2015)
- PBA draft: 2015: 1st round, 11th overall pick
- Drafted by: Alaska Aces
- Playing career: 2015–present

Career history
- 2015–2022: Alaska Aces
- 2022–2025: Converge FiberXers
- 2026–present: NLEX Road Warriors

Career highlights
- NCAA Philippines champion (2015)

Kevin Kent Relato Racal (born May 16, 1991) is a Filipino professional basketball player who plays for the NLEX Road Warriors of the PBA. He is also a former collegiate player for the Letran Knights, helping them reach the NCAA Finals three times and winning one championship with them in 2015.

== College career ==
Racal first studied at the Pamantasan ng Lungsod ng Muntinlupa and suited up for the PLMun Marshalls in the UCLAA. In 2010, he led the Muntinlupa cagers to win the inaugural Coca-Cola Hoopla title by scoring 41 points and was awarded MVP of the tournament. His stint at the Coca-Cola Hoopla was a way for him to be discovered and subsequently recruited to continue his studies at Colegio de San Juan de Letran and play for the Letran Knights.

In his rookie season in 2011, he was a noted slasher, averaging 6.8 points per game. His best performance of his rookie season came in a win over the San Sebastian Stags, in which he contributed 14 points, six rebounds, and five assists. He also gained a reputation as a rugged, hard-nosed defender, as shown during their Final Four match against San Sebastian (in which he nearly had a triple-double with 10 points, 14 rebounds and seven assists) and the finals series against the San Beda Red Lions in 2012. However, in Game 3 of that finals series, he shot only 1-of-9 from the field, and San Beda won the championship.

Upon the graduation of Kevin Alas, Racal and playmaker Mark Cruz took over the scoring reins for the team and powered the Knights to a finals rematch against the Red Lions in 2013 but still came up short. On September 23, 2014, he suffered an ACL injury and was ruled out for the rest of the season while his team was eliminated from the Final Four contention.

He returned to action for the 91st season as the Knights went for the title in his last playing year. In a win over San Beda, he scored eight of his 20 points in the fourth quarter to get into a tie for the first seed with the Perpetual Altas. He then scored 24 points in a win over the Arellano Chiefs as they swept the first round. That season, he was playing out of position as a power forward when he would normally be playing the wing positions. They successfully got back into the Final Four with a twice-to-beat advantage. From there, they got back into the finals where in Game 1, he scored a career-high 28 points to lead the team to the win. His team successfully dethroned the Red Lions in Game 3 to win the NCAA Championship, which Letran last won in 2005. In that game, he finished with 23 points, five rebounds and two assists. However, a day after he won the championship, he made racist online comments about a San Beda player. He deleted the comments and apologized on Facebook. For his performance that season, he won the Pivotal Player of the Year award together with FEU's Roger Pogoy in the 2016 Collegiate Basketball Awards organized by UAAP-NCAA Press Corps.

== Professional career ==
=== Alaska Aces (2015–2022) ===
On August 23, 2015, Racal was drafted 11th overall by the Alaska Aces in the 2015 PBA draft. On October 30, 2015, a day after he won a championship for Letran, he signed a two-year multi-million contract to play for the Aces. He played few minutes in the beginning of the season until he suddenly got inserted into the starting lineup for Game 4 of the 2016 Commissioner's Cup Finals against the Rain or Shine Elasto Painters as a replacement for the injured Ping Exciminiano. In that game, he contributed seven points, three rebounds, two assists and three turnovers while defending Paul Lee as Alaska got its first win of the series. In Game 6, he scored 15 points, but Alaska lost and Rain or Shine won the championship.

In a 2016–17 Philippine Cup loss to the TNT KaTropa, Racal scored 14 points. In a win over the Phoenix Fuel Masters, he scored a PBA career-high 20 points along with six rebounds in 37 minutes as he stepped up for the injured Calvin Abueva. That season, he struggled with his shooting, as he often had bad shooting nights. Also, the Aces failed to make the playoffs of two conferences and also lost 14 straight games. At the end of the season, he was given a two-year contract.

In a 2017–18 Philippine Cup win over the Meralco Bolts, Racal made two clutch three-pointers as the Aces won their first game of the season. From there, they won three more games including one over the Blackwater Elite in which he contributed 14 points with two made triples and four rebounds. They got into the playoffs thanks to a win over the Rain or Shine Elasto Painters in which he had 13 points and a clutch free throw made with three seconds remaining. In the quarterfinals, they lost twice to the NLEX Road Warriors, and were eliminated. In the 2018 Governors' Cup, the Aces made it to the Finals by beating Meralco in the semifinals. There, they lost to the Magnolia Hotshots in six games.

Throughout the 2019 season, Racal suffered from back injuries. He was able to play in the Governors' Cup, helping them gain the seventh seed after starting the conference with five straight losses. He signed another two-year deal with them at the end of their season.

In the opening game of the Aces' 2020 season, Racal hurt his knee. A day later, it was confirmed that he had torn his ACL and would not be able to play for the rest of the season. He made his return in the 2021 Governors' Cup.

=== Converge FiberXers (2022–2025) ===
On April 27, 2022, Racal signed a one-year deal with the Converge FiberXers, the new team that took over the defunct Alaska Aces franchise. In a Philippine Cup loss to TNT, he scored 15 points. On April 18, 2023, he signed a two-year contract extension with the team.

=== NLEX Road Warriors (2026–present) ===
On February 24, 2026, Racal, alongside with Schonny Winston, was traded by Converge to the NLEX Road Warriors in a three-team trade with the Meralco Bolts.

== PBA career statistics ==
Legend
GP	Games played	MPG	Minutes per game	FG%	Field-goal percentage
3FG%	3-point field-goal percentage	4P%	4-point field-goal percentage	FT%	Free-throw percentage
RPG	Rebounds per game	APG	Assists per game	SPG	Steals per game
BPG	Blocks per game	PPG	Points per game	127	Career high

As of the end of 2024–25 season

=== Season-by-season averages ===
Year	Team	GP	MPG	FG%	3P%	4P%	FT%	RPG	APG	SPG	BPG	PPG
2015–16	Alaska	26	17.9	.462	.324	—	.692	1.7	.9	.4	.1	3.9
2016–17	Alaska	35	26.1	.352	.292	—	.750	3.0	1.3	.7	.3	5.7
2017–18	Alaska	51	23.6	.401	.370	—	.735	3.0	1.6	.9	.1	5.8
2019	Alaska	25	21.4	.443	.412	—	.815	2.6	1.3	.8	.3	4.8
2020	Alaska	1	13.3	.750	1.000	—	—	2.0	1.0	1.0	—	8.0
2021	Alaska	13	13.0	.400	.333	—	.000	1.0	.8	.5	.1	2.3
2022–23	Converge	35	17.0	.351	.321	—	.920	1.9	.9	.5	.2	4.1
2023–24	Converge	8	21.1	.400	.263	—	.700	3.4	1.0	.3	—	5.0
2024–25	Converge	34	20.9	.430	.458	—	.857	1.8	.8	.4	.0	5.8
Career		228	20.9	.400	.366	—	.765	2.4	1.1	.6	.1	5.0

== Personal life ==
In 2020, Racal married his long-time partner, Sarah Ramirez. They have two daughters.
