= Arinze Onuaku =

American basketball player (born 1987)

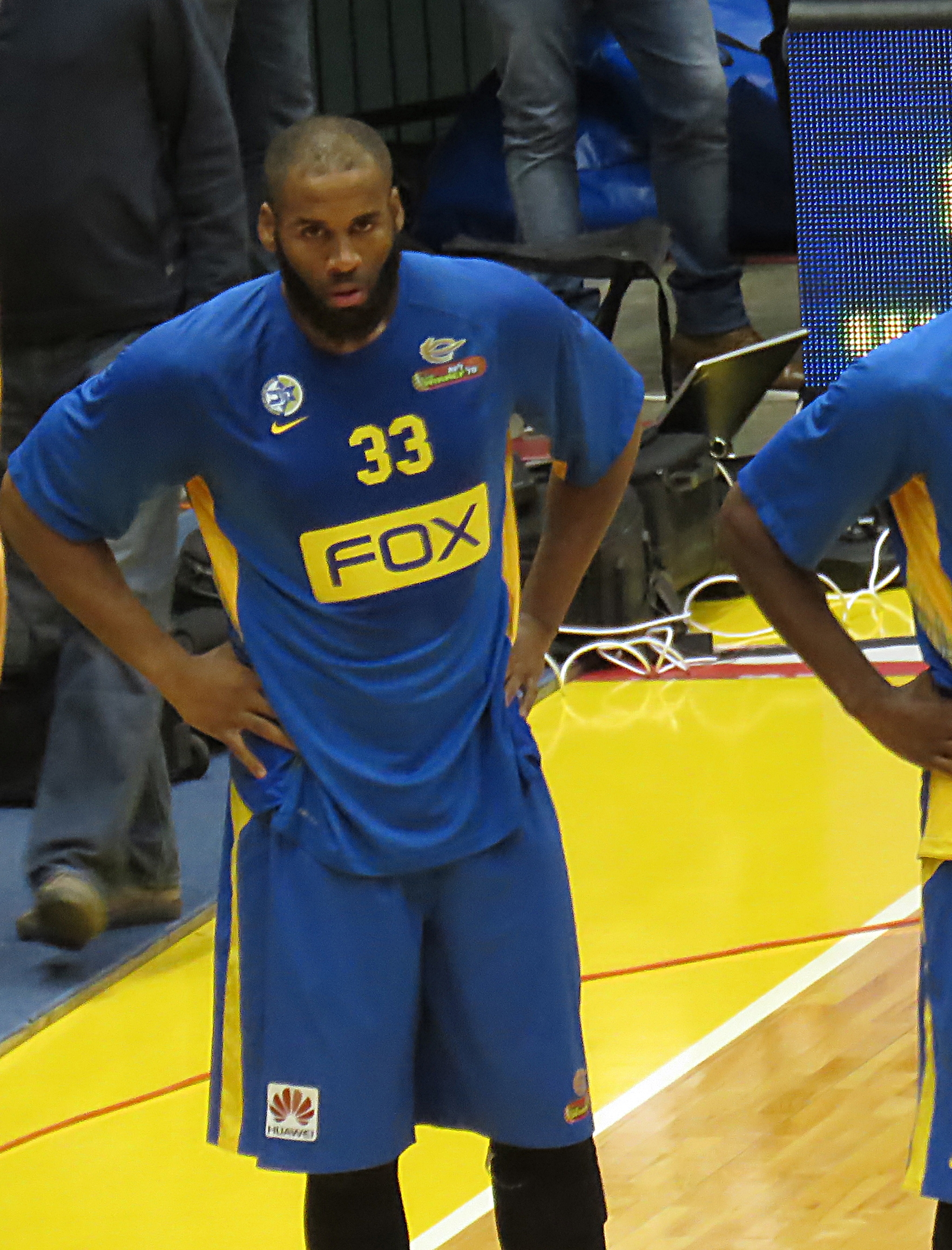
- Onuaku with Maccabi

Syracuse Orange
- Title: Assistant coach
- League: Atlantic Coast Conference

Personal information
- Born: July 13, 1987 (age 39) Lanham, Maryland, U.S.
- Listed height: 6 ft 9 in (2.06 m)
- Listed weight: 275 lb (125 kg)

Career information
- High school: DuVal (Lanham, Maryland); Episcopal (Alexandria, Virginia)
- College: Syracuse (2005–2010)
- NBA draft: 2010: undrafted
- Playing career: 2011–2019
- Position: Power forward / center
- Number: 21, 50
- Coaching career: 2022–present

Career history

Playing
- 2011: Rio Grande Valley Vipers
- 2011: Neptūnas Klaipėda
- 2012–2015: Canton Charge
- 2013: New Orleans Pelicans
- 2014: Cleveland Cavaliers
- 2014: →Canton Charge
- 2014: Chongqing Flying Dragons
- 2015: Minnesota Timberwolves
- 2015–2016: Maccabi Tel Aviv
- 2016: Meralco Bolts
- 2016–2017: Orlando Magic
- 2017: Hunan Yongsheng
- 2018: Zhejiang Golden Bulls
- 2018: Meralco Bolts
- 2019: Al-Riffa SC

Coaching
- 2022–2023: Capital City Go-Go (assistant)
- 2023–2024: Gonzaga College HS (assistant)
- 2024–2026: Siena (assistant)
- 2026–present: Syracuse (assistant)

Career highlights
- PBA Best Import of the Conference (2016 Commissioner's); All-NBA D-League Second Team (2015); All-NBA D-League Third Team (2014); 3× NBA D-League All-Star (2013–2015)
- Stats at NBA.com
- Stats at Basketball Reference

Arinze Christopher Onuaku (listern; born July 13, 1987) is an American basketball coach and former player who is currently an assistant coach for the Syracuse Orange of the Atlantic Coast Conference (ACC), his alma mater.

== High school career ==
Onuaku attended DuVal High School in Lanham, Maryland before transferring in 2003, following his sophomore year, to Episcopal High School in Alexandria, Virginia. As a senior in 2004–05, he earned the Episcopal High School William Caskie Watts MVP Award after helping his squad to a 12–11 record.

== College career ==
In his freshman season at Syracuse, Onuaku was named to the Big East Conference All-Academic Team and earned SU Athletic Director's Honor Roll recognition in each of his first two semesters. In 29 games, he averaged 2.0 points and 2.8 rebounds per game.

In October 2006, Onuaku underwent surgery on his left knee and subsequently redshirted the 2006–07 season. He was, however, named to the Big East Conference All-Academic Team and earned SU Athletic Director's Honor Roll recognition for the second straight year following the fall and spring semesters.

In his redshirted sophomore season, Onuaku ranked second in the Big East Conference and ninth in the nation in field-goal percentage with 62.8%. He was named to the Big East Conference All-Academic Team for the third straight year, and was on the SU Athletic Director's Honor Roll for the fall semester. In 35 games, he averaged 12.7 points, 8.1 rebounds, 1.0 steals and 1.3 blocks per game.

In his junior season, Onuaku was again named to the SU Athletic Director's Honor Roll for the fall semester. In 38 games, he averaged 10.3 points, 7.3 rebounds and 1.4 blocks per game.

In his senior season, Onuaku became the 52nd player in Syracuse history to score 1,000 points with four against Florida on December 10, 2009. For the fourth straight year, he was named to the SU Athletic Director's Honor Roll for the fall semester. He also earned 2009 Pre-season All-Big East Honorable Mention honors. In March 2010, he suffered a season-ending leg injury during the Big East Tournament quarter-finals against Georgetown. In 32 games (31 starts), he averaged 10.5 points, 5.1 rebounds and 1.1 blocks in 22.8 minutes per game.

Onuaku finished his career first on the Syracuse all-time list with a .648 field goal percentage (540-for-833), and 11th all-time with 148 blocked shots.

== Professional career ==
=== 2010–11 season ===
Onuaku went undrafted in the 2010 NBA draft. On March 2, 2011, he was acquired by the Rio Grande Valley Vipers.

=== 2011–12 season ===
On September 14, 2011, Onuaku signed with Klaipėdos Neptūnas of Lithuania for the 2011–12 season. In December 2011, he parted ways with Neptūnas following a knee injury.

=== 2012–13 season ===
On November 2, 2012, Onuaku was selected by the Reno Bighorns in the fourth round of the 2012 NBA Development League draft. Three days later, he was traded to the Canton Charge. On February 4, 2013, he was named to the Futures All-Star roster for the 2013 NBA D-League All-Star Game.

=== 2013–14 season ===
In July 2013, Onuaku joined the Phoenix Suns for the 2013 NBA Summer League and on August 22, 2013, he signed with the New Orleans Pelicans. However, they waived him on November 12. On November 27, he was re-acquired by the Canton Charge. On February 13, 2014, he was named to the Futures All-Star team for the 2014 NBA D-League All-Star Game, as a replacement for Dewayne Dedmon.

On February 22, 2014, Onuaku signed a 10-day contract with the Cleveland Cavaliers. He was assigned back down to the Charge the same day. The next day, he was recalled by the Cavaliers. On March 4, he signed a second 10-day contract with the Cavaliers. On March 8, he was reassigned to the Charge. He was recalled the same day after playing in the Charge's 118–110 win over the Idaho Stampede. He also received assignments to the Charge on March 9 and March 11. On March 12, he was waived by the Cavaliers. The next day, he was re-acquired by the Charge.

In May 2014, Onuaku joined the Chongqing Flying Dragons for the 2014 NBL season. He left the team in late June after averaging 28.6 points and 14.8 rebounds in 19 games.

=== 2014–15 season ===
In July 2014, Onuaku joined the Indiana Pacers for the Orlando Summer League and the New Orleans Pelicans for the Las Vegas Summer League. On September 5, he signed with the Pacers, only to be waived by the team on October 25. On November 22, he was reacquired by the Canton Charge. On February 4, 2015, he was named to his third Futures All-Star team, this time for the 2015 NBA D-League All-Star Game.

On April 7, 2015, Onuaku signed with the Minnesota Timberwolves for the rest of the season to help the team deal with numerous injuries. Minnesota had to use an NBA hardship exemption in order to sign him as he made their roster stand at 16, one over the allowed limited of 15. He made his debut for the Timberwolves later that day, recording 6 points and 5 rebounds in a loss to the Sacramento Kings.

=== 2015–16 season ===
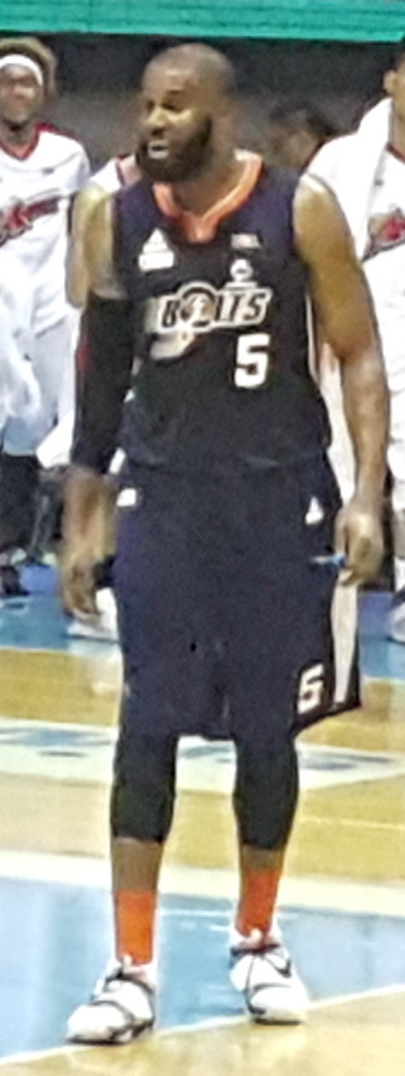
Onuaku during his stint with the Meralco Bolts.

In July 2015, Onuaku joined the Indiana Pacers for the Orlando Summer League and the Brooklyn Nets for the Las Vegas Summer League. On October 6, 2015, he signed a three-month contract with Israeli powerhouse team Maccabi Tel Aviv. On January 22, 2016, Onuaku was released by Maccabi, after he declined a one-month contract extension offered by the team.

On February 6, 2016, Onuaku signed with the Meralco Bolts of the Philippine Basketball Association as the team's import for the 2016 PBA Commissioner's Cup. He went on to win the PBA Best Import of the Conference Award.

=== 2016–17 season ===
In July 2016, Onuaku joined the Orlando Magic white team for the 2016 Orlando Summer League. On September 8, 2016, he signed with the Magic. On January 6, 2017, he was waived by the Magic after appearing in eight games.

On June 8, 2017, Onuaku signed with Hunan Yongsheng of China for the 2017 NBL season.

=== 2017–18 season ===
Onuaku signed with the Zhejiang Golden Bulls of the Chinese Basketball Association for the remainder of the 2017–18 season on February 5, 2018, after the team waived Jarnell Stokes.

In March 2018, Onuaku signed again with the Meralco Bolts of the Philippine Basketball Association as their import for the 2018 PBA Commissioner's Cup.

== The Basketball Tournament ==
Arinze Onuaku played for Boeheim's Army in the 2018 edition of The Basketball Tournament. In 4 games, he averaged 9.5 points, 5.8 rebounds, and .5 blocks per game. Boeheim's Army reached the Northeast Regional Championship before falling to the Golden Eagles.

== Coaching career ==
Onuaku was hired as an assistant coach at Siena College in 2024 after serving as an assistant coach in a variety of capacities since his playing career ended.

== Personal life ==
Onuaku is the son of Christopher and Anastasia Onuaku, and has three siblings: Ify, Chinanu and Michael. Chinanu is also a professional basketball player.

== NBA career statistics ==
Legend
GP	Games played	GS	Games started	MPG	Minutes per game
FG%	Field goal percentage	3P%	3-point field goal percentage	FT%	Free throw percentage
RPG	Rebounds per game	APG	Assists per game	SPG	Steals per game
BPG	Blocks per game	PPG	Points per game	**Bold**	Career high

=== Regular season ===
Year	Team	GP	GS	MPG	FG%	3P%	FT%	RPG	APG	SPG	BPG	PPG
2013–14	New Orleans	**3**	0	8.3	.250	.000	**.500**	2.3	**1.0**	.0	.0	1.0
2013–14	Cleveland	2	0	2.5	.000	.000	.000	.5	.0	.0	.0	.0
2014–15	Minnesota	6	**1**	**11.3**	**.857**	.000	.375	**3.5**	.7	**.2**	**.5**	**4.5**
2016–17	Orlando	**8**	0	3.5	.500	.000	.000	.8	.3	.0	.1	.5
**Career**		19	1	6.6	.652	.000	.400	1.8	.5	.1	.2	1.8
