= Paul Lee (basketball) =

Filipino basketball player (born 1989)

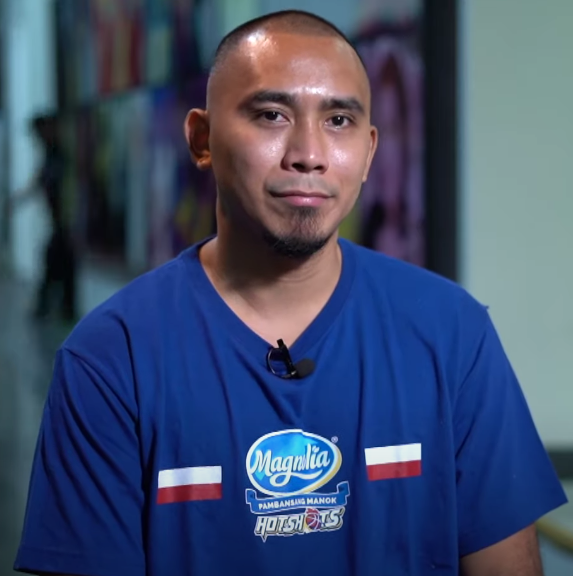
- Lee in 2022

No. 3 – Magnolia Chicken Timplados Hotshots
- Position: Shooting guard / point guard
- League: PBA

Personal information
- Born: February 14, 1989 (age 37) Tondo, Manila, Philippines
- Listed height: 6 ft 0 in (1.83 m)
- Listed weight: 200 lb (91 kg)

Career information
- High school: San Sebastian (Manila)
- College: UE
- PBA draft: 2011: 1st round, 2nd overall pick
- Drafted by: Rain or Shine Elasto Painters
- Playing career: 2011–present

Career history
- 2011–2016: Rain or Shine Elasto Painters
- 2016–present: Star / Magnolia Hotshots

Career highlights
- 3× PBA champion (2012 Governors', 2016 Commissioner's, 2018 Governors'); PBA Finals MVP (2016 Commissioner's); PBA Best Player of the Conference (2018 Governors'); 9× PBA All-Star (2012, 2014–2019, 2023, 2024); PBA All-Star Game MVP (2023); 2× PBA Mythical First Team (2015, 2018); 2× PBA Mythical Second Team (2012, 2014); PBA Rookie of the Year (2012); PBA All-Rookie Team (2012); 2× PBA Order of Merit (2015, 2018); PBA Comeback Player of the Year (2016); PBA 3-Point Shootout champion (2023); UAAP Most Improved Player (2009); 2× UAAP Mythical Five (2009, 2010); PBL Best Player of the Conference (2008-09 PG Flex Linoleum Cup); 2× PBL Mythical First Team (2008-09 Season, 2010 PG Flex-Erase Placenta)

Paul John Dalistan Lee (born February 14, 1989) is a Filipino professional basketball player for the Magnolia Chicken Timplados Hotshots of the Philippine Basketball Association (PBA). He was drafted 2nd overall by Rain or Shine in the 2011 PBA draft.

== Early life and education ==
Paul John Lee was born on February 14, 1989, to Edwin Lee and Helen Dalistan. Due to his parents' being unmarried at the time of his birth, his legal surname at birth was his mother's maiden surname, Dalistan. His parents would get married on October of the following year.

Lee was born in Tondo, Manila, to a family of three children. While his paternal ancestors of Chinese roots had a history of being involved in the lumber industry since the 19th century, Lee's family did not inherit much wealth. Paul John's family lived as a lower middle class household, with his father working as a pedicab driver and his mother briefly working as a domestic worker in the Middle East. His family would avoid seeking financial assistance from their other relatives. When Paul needed money, he would work as a pedicab driver, ceramic tile carrier, or as a ball boy at a tennis court.

In grade school, Lee tried different sports such as badminton and baseball. He chose to pursue basketball, as he learned how to play from watching NBA games on TV ever since he was four years old. He learned the game without any formal training. As a young teenager, Lee would already play basketball and join local competitions in Tondo.

Lee would attend high school at the San Sebastian College – Recoletos. He would then move to the University of the East to pursue a college education under a full scholarship.

== Amateur career ==
=== High school ===
When he was a high school freshman in San Sebastian College – Recoletos, he thought of trying out for their varsity basketball team, but decided not to after seeing how the varsity team players were bigger than him. Although he kept playing basketball, he tried out for other sports as well, such as table tennis, which he played until his third year. He was discovered in his third year when he was playing in the school's intramurals. The coach spotted him, made him try out and placed him in the lineup the following year. His coach and teammates would provide him allowance when he needed it so he could keep practicing with the team. The San Sebastian Staglets would go on to win the NCAA Juniors Championship in his senior year in 2005. He would also make the Mythical Five that year.

=== College ===
After his high school career ended, Lee accounts that no university team gave him an invitation to play for their team. He would receive an endorsement from the father of his San Sebastian teammate Raphy Reyes to play for the University of the East (UE).

Lee would make the team after impressing then-coach Dindo Pumaren, which at that time had formidable backcourt players like Raffy Reyes, Paul Zamar, James Martinez and Marcy Arellano. He decided to spend a year in UE's Team B. In 2007, he rejoined the main roster. His role during that time was with the second squad. He was known as the 6th man, the main guard off the bench.

In 2009, Lee's game flourished when Lawrence Chongson took over to coach the team. Chongson later became his adviser, and currently an agent, until his death in 2021. Lee first played for him with the Cobra Energy Drink Iron Men in the Philippine Basketball League and later in the PBA Developmental League. In the PBL, he was once awarded as the league's Best Player of the Conference, with averages of 15.1 points, 6.3 rebounds, 3.8 assists and 1.6 steals per game. His play in the PBL led to an improved junior season in which he received the Most Improved Player award in UAAP Season 72 with improved averages of 15.3 points, 5.9 rebounds, and 5.0 assists. They also reached the finals that season.

In his last year in UE, Season 73, Lee was playing through multiple injuries, but he didn't want anybody to know about it. He also played power forward that year. UE did not qualify for the playoffs that season, finishing in sixth. Despite his injuries, he did not miss a game and still made the Mythical Team as UE's top scorer with 14.4 points, 6.7 rebounds, 4.6 assists, and 2.0 steals. Although he had a year of eligibility remaining, he decided not to return when UE did not renew Chongson's contract, applying for the PBA draft.

In 2014, eight years after he enrolled in UE, Lee graduated with a business degree.

== Professional career ==
=== Rain or Shine Elasto Painters (2011–2016) ===
==== 2011–2012: Rookie of the Year ====
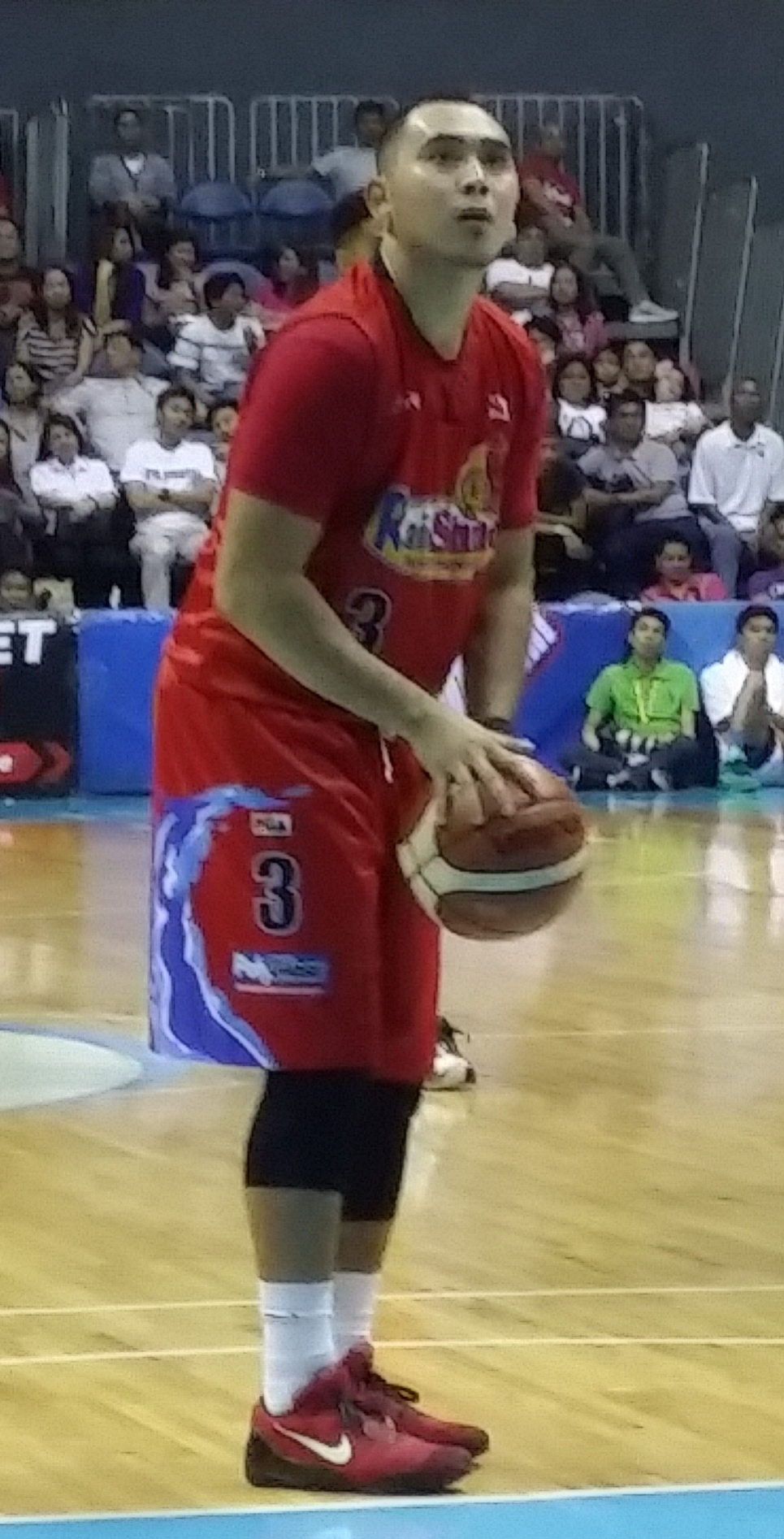
Lee with Rain or Shine in 2016

Lee was picked 2nd overall by Rain or Shine during the 2011 PBA draft. He signed a three-year ₱8.7 million deal with the team. In his PBA debut, a win over Barangay Ginebra during the 2011–12 Philippine Cup, he had 21 points, eight assists, five rebounds, and two steals. He then had 19 points, including two clutch free throws, in a win over the Powerade Tigers. They started the conference winning seven out of their first eight games, including a five-game winning streak that briefly saw Rain or Shine take first place in the standings.

In Game 1 of the quarterfinals against higher-seeded Ginebra, down by as much as 17 points in the third quarter, Lee led a 43-point quarter from Rain or Shine to take the game into overtime and eventually win. They then moved on to the semifinals, where they faced Powerade, led by the player taken ahead of him in the draft, JVee Casio. In Game 1, he scored 22 of his 25 points in the second half to take the opening win. His 25 points were his career-high at the time. In Game 3, he had 19 points, but fouled Gary David as he was taking a three. David made all three free throws, sending the game into overtime which Powerade won. The series went on to last seven games, which Powerade eventually won.

In the Commissioner's Cup, Lee struggled as his averages in points, rebounds, and assists dropped and the team failed to make the playoffs. He then got to play in the RSJ team against the Veterans in the 2012 All-Star Game. In the 2012 Governors' Cup, he started with 17 points, two rebounds and four assists in a 107–100 win over the Alaska Aces. The following game, he had another strong game having recorded 17 points and five rebounds in a 100–94 win over the B-Meg Llamados. He then made a game-winning three-pointer with 2.6 seconds remaining in a win over Ginebra. Rain or Shine finished the elimination round with only one loss. By the end of the 2011–12 PBA season, he was awarded Rookie of the Year, and won his first ever PBA championship with the Elasto Painters, though he did not play in most of the championship series due to a shoulder injury in Game 2.

==== 2012–2013 ====
Lee made his return during the 2012–13 Philippine Cup elimination round with 16 points, four rebounds, and six assists in a win over the Barako Bull Energy. He then had 11 points in a Game 1 win of the quarterfinals against Ginebra. Ginebra then extended that series as although he had 19 points, he shot 5-of-14 from the field. To close out the series, he scored 14 of his 25 points in the third quarter of Game 3 as Rain or Shine moved on to the semifinals against the San Mig Coffee Mixers. In Game 1 of the semifinals, he had 15 points as Rain or Shine took the first win. Although he struggled in Games 4 and 5, he stepped up with 15 points as Rain or Shine made its first finals appearance in the Philippine Cup. In the finals, they lost to the Talk 'N Text Tropang Texters.

In the Commissioner's Cup, Lee had a conference-high 20 points against Barako Bull. He then got to play in the Greats vs. Stalwarts game during the 2013 PBA All-Star Weekend. Although Rain or Shine was second in the standings and had a twice-to-beat advantage in the playoffs, they lost in the first round to Ginebra. During the Governors' Cup playoffs, Rain or Shine made it past the GlobalPort Batang Pier in the first round, but he tore a calf muscle in his right leg, causing him to miss the semifinals.

==== 2013–2014 ====
During the 2013–14 Philippine Cup, Lee made a go-ahead three-point play for a win over the Meralco Bolts. In a win over San Mig Coffee, he scored what was his career-high at the time with 26 points. He followed it up with 20 points against GlobalPort, but missed what could have been the game-winning three-pointer. In the semifinals against the Petron Blaze Boosters, he sprained his ankle in Game 4. He was able to play in Game 5 as Rain or Shine beat Petron 4–1 to made it back to the finals. In the finals, they faced San Mig. In Game 1, on his 25th birthday, he made the game-winning alley-oop lay-up with 0.9 seconds remaining. Rain or Shine would eventually lose in the finals 4–2.

With Gilas, Lee played in the All-Star Game that season. In the Commissioner's Cup, they finished the elimination round with a record of 5–4, good for fourth place. Although they got past Meralco in the first round, he suffered knee and heel injuries during that series. Although he was able to play through them, he struggled throughout the semifinals as they were eliminated by Talk 'N Text. In the Governors' Cup, they reached their fourth straight semifinals, this time against Alaska. In Game 1, he had three turnovers in the fourth quarter which Alaska keyed on to take the win. He then bounced back with 21 points (11 in the fourth quarter) to even the series. To close out the series, he made a clutch lay-up, a clutch steal, and two clutch free throws as Rain or Shine made its second finals appearance that season. Once again, in the finals, they faced San Mig, now seeking a grand slam. They lost in five games in that series.

==== 2014–15 ====
During the 2014 offseason, Lee requested the Rain or Shine management to trade him by personally calling up coach Yeng Guiao. However, Guiao and the Rain or Shine management were firm on keeping him at all costs. After he returned from Spain following his Gilas stint in the 2014 FIBA Basketball World Cup, he went to a sabbatical by not showing up to Rain or Shine practice or even talking to the media, creating speculations of him pushing through signing up with another team. A few days later, he finally showed up, and after a heart-to-heart talk with Guiao, he finally decided to stay with the Elasto Painters. On September 19, 2014, he, together with his agent Lawrence Chongson, signed a 2-year max deal to stay with Rain or Shine.

In the 2014–15 season opener, Lee hyperextended his knee in the first quarter against the San Miguel Beermen, sitting out the rest of the game. After missing one game, he made his return with 22 points and four rebounds in a win over the Kia Sorento. He then had a season-high 27 points in a comeback win over the NLEX Road Warriors. Rain or Shine finished the elimination round on a seven-game winning streak for a 9–2 record and an automatic slot in the semifinals. In Game 1 of the semifinals against Alaska, he was held to just seven points on 3-of-13 shooting from the field. He then bounced back with 13 points, eight of them in the fourth quarter, as Rain or Shine evened the series. However, Alaska's defense continued to hold him to below his elimination round averages, and they were able to beat Rain or Shine in six games.

Lee started the 2015 Commissioner's Cup with a win over NLEX in which he had 25 points. He matched that point total in their second game, a win over GlobalPort. Once again, Rain or Shine made the semifinals, where they swept Meralco despite him dealing with an ankle injury. In the finals, they faced Talk 'N Text. Once again, Rain or Shine finished as the runner-up for the fourth time in eight conferences as Talk 'N Text took the championship. For the conference, Lee finished in second for the Best Player of the Conference award.

In the Governors' Cup, Rain or Shine made its seventh straight semifinals appearance. Their season then ended as San Miguel closed out the series 3–1. For the season, Lee was named to the Mythical First Team. He also won the Order of Merit award for being named as the Player of the Week the most times during the season, which he did four times.

==== 2015–2016: Second championship ====
In a tuneup game before the start of the 2015–16 season, Lee suffered a partial tear to the meniscus and ACL on his left knee. He was able to make his season debut during the semifinals of the 2015–16 Philippine Cup against San Miguel. Although he was able to play in the series (including a 23-point performance in Game 4), the knee swelled again and he could only watch as Rain or Shine was eliminated in Game 6.

Lee then missed two months to make sure of his recovery, making his return during the Commissioner's Cup. Throughout the elimination rounds and at the start of the playoffs, he deferred to his teammates as he played himself into shape. In Game 4 of the semis against San Miguel, he took the lead once again with a team-high 18 points, along with five assists, and two rebounds off the bench as Rain or Shine advanced to the finals.

Lee led the way in Game 1 with a team-high 20 points and four three-pointers for the opening win against Alaska. In Game 2, off a broken play, he got an offensive rebound and made the game-winning buzzer-beating jumper for a 2–0 lead. In Game 6, he closed out the finals with 20 points as Rain or Shine won its first title since 2012. He was named as the Finals MVP as he averaged 15.7 points throughout the finals. For the season, he was awarded as the Comeback Player of the Year for leading Rain or Shine to the title despite his injuries in the previous conference.

=== Star / Magnolia Hotshots (2016–present) ===
==== 2016–2017 ====
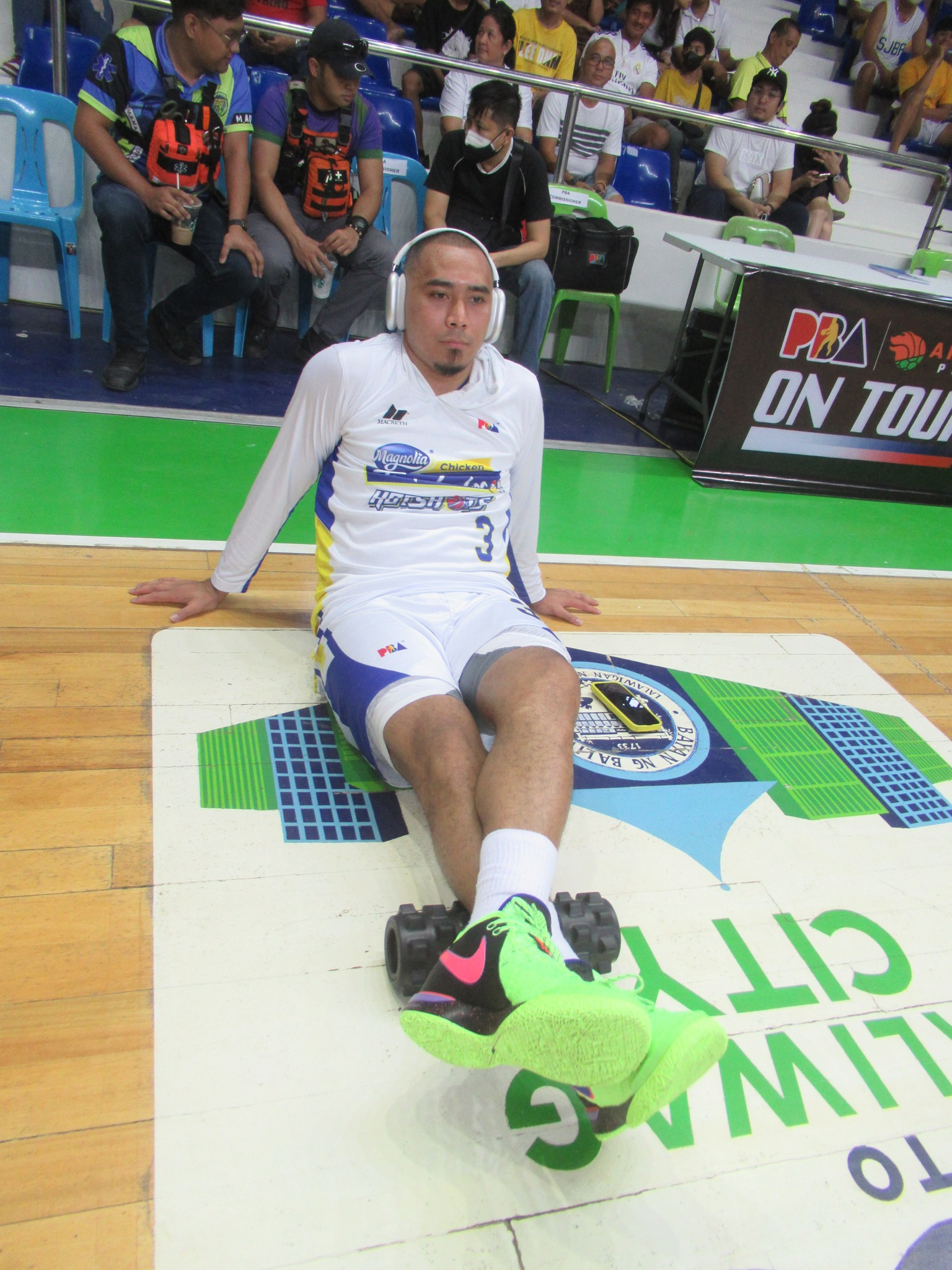
Lee in 2023

On October 13, 2016, Paul Lee was sent to Star Hotshots on a blockbuster trade in exchange for star shooting guard James Yap in one of the biggest deals in PBA history that led to shocked reactions from basketball fans. In his debut, he had a double-double of 12 points and 10 rebounds, but also had nine turnovers as Star lost to San Miguel to begin the 2016–17 Philippine Cup. After losing back-to-back games, Star had its first win of the conference in which he had 20 points. After a 4–4 record towards the end of the elimination round, he contributed to Star winning its next eight games, including the quarterfinals and the first two games of the semifinals against Ginebra. He was then limited to seven and nine points respectively in Games 3 and 4 as Ginebra tied the series. Ginebra then went on to win the series in Game 7, in which they held him to four points on 2-of-8 shooting.

Lee was then selected as a Luzon All-Star playing against Gilas Pilipinas during the 2017 All-Star Week. In the Commissioner's Cup, he led Star to a 9–2 record. Facing his former team Rain or Shine in the quarterfinals, Star beat them in a best-of-three series. In the semis against San Miguel, he played through a leg injury as they lost the series, 3–1.

In the Governors' Cup, the Hotshots started 4–0 and eventually finished in the top four. In the quarterfinals, he had 18 points over NLEX as they advanced to the semifinals once again. However, a slight meniscus tear ruled him out for the rest of the series and the season.

==== 2017–2018: Third PBA championship ====
In the offseason, Lee underwent surgery for his knee. He was able to play in the Hotshots' 2017–18 season debut, with 30 points in a win over Alaska. Midway through the 2017–18 Philippine Cup, he sprained his ankle, causing him to miss three games. In the quarterfinals, he had a game-high 13 rebounds to lead the Hotshots past the Batang Pier. Facing NLEX in the semifinals, he struggled in Game 1 with five turnovers and just eight points. Rallying around teammate Marc Pingris, who tore his ACL in Game 1, he led a bounce-back win in Game 2 with 27 points. He then had 14 points and six assists in Game 3 for a 2–1 series lead. The Hotshots eventually won the series in six games, advancing to the finals against the Beermen. Playing through injured fingers, the Beermen won the title over the Hotshots in seven games.

That season, Lee was once again an All-Star and also competed in the Three-Point Shootout during All-Star Week. Against TNT during the 2018 Commissioner's Cup, he had a conference-high 25 points. They qualified for the playoffs as the seventh seed, where they lost to Alaska in the quarterfinals.

Lee missed the start of the Governors' Cup as he was on loan to the national team. In his second game back, he had 22 points, seven assists, and four steals. He then had 28 points including a game-winner over San Miguel. During the conference, he re-signed with the Hotshots for three years. In the quarterfinals, he led with a double-double of 22 points and 12 rebounds as they made it to the semifinals. In Game 1, he scored nine of the Hotshots’ last 11 points in the fourth quarter and finished with 27 points as they took the opening win. He then followed it up with a clutch free-throw in a close win in Game 2. In Game 3, they had a chance to sweep the best-of-three series but made an errant pass and missed a three-pointer that extended the series for Ginebra. Playing through a hurting leg in Game 4, he made two clutch free throws with 13 seconds remaining as the moved on to the finals.

In Game 1 against Alaska, the Hotshots took the opening win. After winning the first two games, Alaska won the next two games. In Game 5, Lee, struggling with his shot all series, grabbed a loose ball, and made the game-winning jumper with 1.3 seconds remaining. He then scored nine of his 16 points as he won his first title with Magnolia. Aside from winning a title, he had also been awarded as Best Player of the Conference with averages of 17.6 points, 4.4 rebounds, and 3.1 assists. For the 2017–18 season, he was named to the First Mythical Team.

==== 2019: 5K points club ====
In the 2019 season opener, Lee injured his thumb against TNT. Although he was able to play through it, Magnolia started the Philippine Cup 0–3. He then injured his knee against the Batang Pier, but was able to play the following game. In the last game off the elimination round, coming off 27 points in the All-Star Game, he had 26 points on six three-pointers as Magnolia secured the sixth seed. In the quarterfinals against Ginebra, the Hotshots defeated them in three games, with him leading with 25 points in the series-clinching win. Facing Rain or Shine in the semifinals, they lost the first two games, then won the next three games despite a scoreless Game 5. Magnolia was able to eventually win the series in seven games for a finals rematch against San Miguel. He started the finals with 18 points, six rebounds, five assists, and the win. In Game 5, he injured his shoulder but was able to play through it. Despite leading in the series 3–2, the Beermen were able to win the Philippine Cup once again.

During the 2019 Commissioner's Cup, Magnolia went on a five-game winning streak. The streak ended with a loss to the Blackwater Elite in which he had 25 points. Despite the loss, Lee reached the 5,000 points club. That conference, Magnolia was eliminated in the quarterfinals by Ginebra. In the Governors' Cup, they were unable to defend their title as they lost to TNT in the quarterfinals.

==== 2020–2021 ====
To start the 2020 Philippine Cup, Lee hit a clutch four-point play with 32.5 seconds remaining for a win over NLEX. In a four-game stretch, he averaged 25.3 points, 4.5 rebounds, and 3.8 assists for four straight wins. Magnolia entered the quarterfinals on a six-game winning streak. Their run ended early in a quarterfinals loss to the Phoenix Fuel Masters, which also ended their season.

Magnolia started the 2021 Philippine Cup winning their first three games. Against the Terrafirma Dyip, he injured his hamstring. During the enhanced community quarantine, he was able to recover from his injury. In the last game of the elimination round, he scored 18 of his 32 points in the fourth quarter of a win over San Miguel as they finished with an 8–3 record. In the quarterfinals, they beat Rain or Shine, then took down Meralco in six games in the semifinals for a return to the finals. In Game 3 against TNT, he led with 21 points despite dealing with a shoulder injury as they bounced back from losing the first two games of the series. That would be Magnolia's only win of the finals, as TNT won the championship in five games.

Once again, Magnolia started a conference with a perfect record, as they won their first five games. After their first loss of the conference against the Batang Pier, he bounced back with 26 points in a win over the Beermen. In the playoffs, they blew out Phoenix in the quarterfinals. Before the start of their semifinal series against Meralco, he sprained his ankle. Bothered by the injury, he struggled in the first three games of the series, averaging 9.3 points as they fell 2–1. In Game 4, he came through with 17 points with five assists as Magnolia forced a do-or-die game. Meralco, however, won Game 5, eliminating Magnolia.

==== 2022–2023 ====
After missing the Hotshots' season debut due to back spasms, Lee made his return against the Batang Pier. However, he then missed their next four games, as he was not fully recovered. In his return, he had 17 points in a win over Terrafirma. With his return, Magnolia completed a seven-game winning streak to close out the elimination round of the 2022 Philippine Cup. In the playoffs, they defeated NLEX in the quarterfinals. In the semis, they lost to TNT in six games. Although his scoring averages went slightly down, he was the best free throw shooter in the league that conference at 88.9%.

In a game against TNT during the 2022–23 Commissioner's Cup, Lee made two game-winning free throws. They won five straight to start the conference before a loss to Ginebra ended that streak. Against San Miguel, he scored Magnolia's last eight points to seal a playoff spot. He then had a season-high 27 points in a win over Meralco. As the second seed, they defeated Phoenix in the quarterfinals. After losing their opening game of the semis against Ginebra, he made the game-winning jumper off a broken play to tie the series. However, in Game 3, he played limited minutes due to flu-like symptoms. Ginebra eliminated them the following game, their third straight semifinals exit. During the season, he was named All-Star MVP after scoring 32 points off seven four pointers and also won the Three-Point Shootout during All-Star Weekend. Then in the Governors' Cup, they lost in the first round to Meralco.

==== 2023–2024: 1K 3-point club ====
Once again, Magnolia started the season hot with a seven-game win streak in the 2023–24 Commissioner's Cup despite his ankle issues. From there, they made the semifinals against Phoenix. In Game 1, he injured his ankle, but was still able to finish the game and make the game-winning assist to Tyler Bey. The following game, despite shooting 1-of-8 heading into the final minute of a close game, he made a clutch three-pointer from near the arena logo to give Magnolia a 2–0 series lead. They eventually advanced past Phoenix 3–1 to face San Miguel in the finals once again. San Miguel took the first two games of the best-of-seven series. He then contributed to Magnolia tying the series. Despite him scoring a conference-high 25 points in Game 6, San Miguel would win the title 4–2.

Lee was then selected as an All-Star once again. However, he lost his Three-Point Shootout title to Calvin Oftana during All-Star Weekend. In a win over Rain or Shine during the 2024 Philippine Cup, he became the tenth player to hit the 1,000 three-pointers made milestone.

==== 2024–2026 ====
For the 2024–25 season, Lee became more of a facilitator who could still occasionally have big scoring nights. In the Governors' Cup, they were eliminated in the quarterfinals by Rain or Shine, 3–2. During the Commissioner's Cup, he suffered from a rib contusion. He then missed several games due to a meniscus tear. They lost in the first round once again, this time to the Batang Pier. In the Philippine Cup, he had a season-high 27 points on four four-pointers in a win over Meralco as they won six straight games to start the conference. Despite having a twice-to-beat advantage, they lost in the first round once again to TNT.

Lee's averages continued to decline during the 2025–26 season as he had less minutes and less touches. During the 2025–26 Philippine Cup, Lee strained his hamstring in a game against Ginebra. He was eventually ruled out for the rest of the conference including the playoffs after it was revealed that he had torn his hamstring. He was slightly used more the following conference, the Commissioner's Cup, as he got more opportunities. In that conference, they lost to Meralco in the first round.

== PBA career statistics ==
Legend
GP	Games played	MPG	Minutes per game	FG%	Field-goal percentage
3FG%	3-point field-goal percentage	4P%	4-point field-goal percentage	FT%	Free-throw percentage
RPG	Rebounds per game	APG	Assists per game	SPG	Steals per game
BPG	Blocks per game	PPG	Points per game	127	Career high

As of the end of 2025–26 season

=== Season-by-season averages ===
Year	Team	GP	MPG	FG%	3P%	4P%	FT%	RPG	APG	SPG	BPG	PPG
2011–12	Rain or Shine	46	27.5	.465	.344	—	.826	3.7	4.1	.8	.0	13.9
2012–13	Rain or Shine	38	25.5	.374	.331	—	.717	4.2	3.6	.8	.1	11.6
2013–14	Rain or Shine	61	25.8	.403	.362	—	.824	3.2	2.7	.7	.1	13.0
2014–15	Rain or Shine	53	27.6	.409	.395	—	.843	4.5	3.3	.8	.0	15.6
2015–16	Rain or Shine	35	21.2	.418	.319	—	.929	2.7	2.5	.6	—	10.3
2016–17	Star	51	29.8	.387	.331	—	.847	3.7	3.3	.8	.0	12.5
2017–18	Magnolia	52	28.9	.388	.357	—	.833	3.9	3.3	1.1	.1	15.3
2019	Magnolia	53	27.7	.396	.335	—	.859	4.4	3.6	.5	.1	14.2
2020	Magnolia	12	30.4	.447	.404	—	.889	4.0	3.3	1.1	.1	19.7
2021	Magnolia	41	29.5	.356	.298	—	.873	2.9	2.6	.7	.1	15.5
2022–23	Magnolia	44	27.4	.395	.405	—	.902	3.1	2.4	.5	.1	14.8
2023–24	Magnolia	34	27.8	.374	.345	—	.905	3.1	3.4	.4	.0	11.1
2024–25	Magnolia	35	25.0	.414	.341	.383	.902	3.3	4.3	.4	—	11.1
2025–26	Magnolia	31	17.3	.317	.360	.250	.909	2.3	3.2	.6	—	5.8
Career		586	26.7	.396	.353	.339	.852	3.5	3.2	.7	.1	13.2

== National team career ==
Lee had previously been invited to join the Gilas program back when Rajko Toroman was its head, but he begged off due to prioritizing his studies. He was also invited by Chot Reyes before 2014, but declined due to his schedule.

In 2014, Lee was part of the Philippine national team debuting at the 2014 FIBA Asia Cup. Due to the circumstances of his birth, Lee competed as Paul John Dalistan, using his mother's maiden surname. He led the team to a bronze medal finish in the Asian tournament after converting three crucial free-throws with no time remaining against host China.

Lee also competed in the 2014 FIBA Basketball World Cup and the 2014 Asian Games but injuries caused him to get sidelined the following year. He also withdrew from Gilas in 2016 to undergo treatment on his left knee. Injuries also kept him out of Gilas 5.0 in 2017.

In 2018, Yeng Guiao became the coach of the Philippine national team for the 2018 Asian Games. Initially, Lee was not going to be on the roster as Gilas management only wanted Rain or Shine players, as Lee was on Magnolia during this time. Magnolia eventually lent him to the team. The team finished in fifth place, its best finish in 16 years.

Guiao then went on to become the interim head coach for the 2019 FIBA World Cup qualifiers. He retained Lee and most of the other players from the Asian Games roster. In the sixth window, he was instrumental in Gilas' win over Kazakhstan to qualify for the World Cup. He also made the final roster for the World Cup.

== Personal life ==
Lee is married to Rubie Chua with whom he has a daughter. Writer Wilson Lee Flores is his great-uncle. One of Lee's ancestors, Edward Dee Sekiao, was on the ROC basketball team that competed in the 1952 Helsinki Olympics.

In 2015, Lee released an album, Angas ng Tondo, with a lead single, "Angas", a rap song composed by Joven Tan.

Lee often assists the UE Red Warriors informally as a way of giving back to the school. He has mentored several players from their program including Roi Sumang and Rey Remogat. In 2024, he became an assistant coach for La Consolacion College Manila.
