= Ricky Umayam =

Filipino basketball coach

Rain or Shine Elasto Painters
- Position: Assistant coach/Team scout
- League: PBA

Career history

Coaching
- 2013–present: Rain or Shine Elasto Painters (assistant/scout)
- 2013–2014: Letran (assistant)

Career highlights
- As assistant coach: PBA champion (2016 Commissioner's)

Richard "Ricky" Umayam is a Filipino coach who serves as an assistant coach and team scout for the Rain or Shine Elasto Painters in the PBA.

== Career ==
Umayam is notable for being an assistant coach of the Rain or Shine Elasto Painters since 2013 under Yeng Guiao. In the same year, he also joined Letran Knights in the same year when Caloy Garcia, one of his colleagues in Rain or Shine was hired by the colleagiate team. But before he accepted the assistant coaching role, he was already waiting for head coaching offer from Benilde.

In 2018, when Guiao was hired as head coach of the national team, he was tapped to be an assistant. Notably his role was being deputy scout for Ryan Gregorio (who was appointed as special assistant to the SBP president). The team played for 2018 Asian Games. He was also retained for 2019 FIBA Basketball World Cup, and on its preceding qualifying games.
