= 2016–17 San Miguel Beermen season =

- Head coach: Leo Austria
- Owners: San Miguel Brewery, Inc. (a San Miguel Corporation subsidiary)

Philippine Cup results
- Record: 10–1 (90.9%)
- Place: 1st
- Playoff finish: Champions (Defeated Barangay Ginebra, 4–1)

Commissioner's Cup results
- Record: 9–2 (81.8%)
- Place: 1st
- Playoff finish: Champions (Defeated TNT, 4–2)

Governors' Cup results
- Record: 7–4 (63.6%)
- Place: 6th
- Playoff finish: Quarterfinalist (lost to Barangay Ginebra with twice-to-win disadvantage)

San Miguel Beermen seasons

The 2016–17 San Miguel Beermen season was the 42nd season of the franchise in the Philippine Basketball Association (PBA).

== Key dates ==
=== 2016 ===
- October 30: The 2016 PBA draft took place at Midtown Atrium, Robinson Place Manila.

== Draft picks ==
=== Special draft ===
| Player | Position | Nationality | PBA D-League team | College |
|---|---|---|---|---|
| Arnold Van Opstal | Center | Germany | Hapee Fresh Fighters | DLSU |

=== Regular draft ===
| Round | Pick | Player | Position | Nationality | PBA D-League team | College |
|---|---|---|---|---|---|---|
| 2 | 6 | Rashawn McCarthy | Guard | (United States) | AMA Online Education Titans | Old Westbury |
| 3 | 14 | Jovit Dela Cruz | Guard | (Philippines) | LiverMarin Guardians | SSC-R |

== Roster ==
2016–17 San Miguel Beermen roster
Players
Coaches

| Pos. | # | POB | Name | Height | Weight | DOB (YYYY–MM–DD) | From |
|---|---|---|---|---|---|---|---|
| G | 1 | (Philippines) | Brian Heruela | 5 ft 10 in (1.78 m) | 195 lb (88 kg) | 1989–04–13 | Cebu |
| G | 2 | (United States) | Rashawn McCarthy (R) | 6 ft 0 in (1.83 m) | 175 lb (79 kg) | 1989–09–10 | SUNY–Old Westbury |
| G/F | 3 | (Philippines) | Von Pessumal (R) | 6 ft 2 in (1.88 m) | 185 lb (84 kg) | 1993–02–12 | Ateneo |
| F/C | 4 | (Philippines) | Jay-R Reyes | 6 ft 7 in (2.01 m) | 225 lb (102 kg) | 1984–07–16 | UP Diliman |
| G | 5 | (Philippines) | Alex Cabagnot | 6 ft 0 in (1.83 m) | 185 lb (84 kg) | 1982–12–08 | Hawaiʻi–Hilo |
| G | 6 | (United States) | Chris Ross | 6 ft 2 in (1.88 m) | 180 lb (82 kg) | 1985–03–09 | Marshall |
| G/F | 13 | (United States) | Marcio Lassiter | 6 ft 2 in (1.88 m) | 185 lb (84 kg) | 1987–05–16 | Cal State Fullerton |
| C | 15 | (Philippines) | June Mar Fajardo | 6 ft 11 in (2.11 m) | 268 lb (122 kg) | 1989–11–17 | Cebu |
| G/F | 22 | (Philippines) | Matt Ganuelas-Rosser | 6 ft 5 in (1.96 m) | 186 lb (84 kg) | 1990–06–13 | Cal Poly Pomona |
| F | 23 | (Philippines) | Keith Agovida | 6 ft 2 in (1.88 m) | 170 lb (77 kg) | 1990–02–14 | Arellano |
| F | 27 | (Philippines) | Gabby Espinas | 6 ft 4 in (1.93 m) | 208 lb (94 kg) | 1982–01–03 | Philippine Christian |
| F | 29 | (Philippines) | Arwind Santos (C) | 6 ft 4 in (1.93 m) | 175 lb (79 kg) | 1981–06–10 | Far Eastern |
| F | 33 | (Australia) | David Semerad | 6 ft 4 in (1.93 m) | 220 lb (100 kg) | 1991–04–25 | San Beda |
| G/F | 71 | (Philippines) | Ronald Tubid | 6 ft 1 in (1.85 m) | 185 lb (84 kg) | 1981–10–15 | UE |
| C | 95 | (Philippines) | Yancy de Ocampo | 6 ft 9 in (2.06 m) | 245 lb (111 kg) | 1980–03–11 | Saint Francis of Assisi |

Head coach

- (Philippines) Leo Austria

Assistant coach(es)

- (Philippines) Peter Martin (1st Assistant)
- (Philippines) Biboy Ravanes
- (Philippines) Dayong Mendoza
- (Philippines) Boyzie Zamar
- (Philippines) Renato Agustin
- (Philippines) Jorge Gallent

Team manager

- (Philippines) Gelacio Abanilla
- (Philippines) Daniel Henares (Assistant)

Legend

- (C) Team captain
- (CI) Commissioner's Cup Import
- (GI) Governors' Cup Import
- (EI) EASL Import
- (DP) Unsigned draft pick
- (FA) Free agent
- (IN) Inactive
- (S) Suspended
- (R) Rookie
- Injured

Roster

== Philippine Cup ==
=== Eliminations ===
==== Standings ====
| Pos | Team | W | L | PCT | GB | Qualification |
|---|---|---|---|---|---|---|
| 1 | San Miguel Beermen | 10 | 1 | .909 | — | Twice-to-beat in the quarterfinals |
| 2 | Alaska Aces | 7 | 4 | .636 (Note: Head-to-head record: Alaska 1–0 Star) | 3 | Twice-to-beat in the quarterfinals |
| 3 | Star Hotshots | 7 | 4 | .636 | 3 | Best-of-three quarterfinals |
| 4 | TNT KaTropa | 6 | 5 | .545 (Note: Head-to-head quotient: TNT 1.09, GlobalPort 1.00, Phoenix 0.96, Barangay Ginebra 0.94.) | 4 | Best-of-three quarterfinals |
| 5 | GlobalPort Batang Pier | 6 | 5 | .545 | 4 | Best-of-three quarterfinals |
| 6 | Phoenix Fuel Masters | 6 | 5 | .545 | 4 | Best-of-three quarterfinals |
| 7 | Barangay Ginebra San Miguel | 6 | 5 | .545 | 4 | Twice-to-win in the quarterfinals |
| 8 | Rain or Shine Elasto Painters | 5 | 6 | .455 (Note: Eighth seed playoff: Rain or Shine 103–80 Blackwater) | 5 | Twice-to-win in the quarterfinals |
| 9 | Blackwater Elite | 5 | 6 | .455 | 5 | |
| 10 | Mahindra Floodbuster | 3 | 8 | .273 (Note: Head-to-head record: Mahindra 1–0 Meralco) | 7 | |
| 11 | Meralco Bolts | 3 | 8 | .273 | 7 | |
| 12 | NLEX Road Warriors | 2 | 9 | .182 | 8 | |

Source: PBA.ph

==== Game log ====
2017 PBA Philippine Cup game log
Total: 10–1
November: 1–1

| Game | Date | Opponent | Score | High points | High rebounds | High assists | Location Attendance | Record |
|---|---|---|---|---|---|---|---|---|
| 1 | November 20 | Star | W 96–88 | June Mar Fajardo (25) | June Mar Fajardo (16) | Alex Cabagnot (8) | Smart Araneta Coliseum | 1–0 |
| 2 | November 30 | Phoenix | L 85–92 | June Mar Fajardo (19) | June Mar Fajardo (23) | Chris Ross (7) | Ynares Center | 1–1 |

December : 4–0

| Game | Date | Opponent | Score | High points | High rebounds | High assists | Location Attendance | Record |
|---|---|---|---|---|---|---|---|---|
| 3 | December 3 | Alaska | W 93–88 | June Mar Fajardo (23) | June Mar Fajardo (22) | Chris Ross (7) | Smart Araneta Coliseum | 2–1 |
| 4 | December 11 | Mahindra | W 94–91 | June Mar Fajardo (28) | June Mar Fajardo (15) | RR Garcia (5) | Smart Araneta Coliseum | 3–1 |
| 5 | December 17 | NLEX | W 106–80 | Alex Cabagnot (18) | June Mar Fajardo (12) | Chris Ross (5) | Xavier University Gym | 4–1 |
| 6 | December 28 | Meralco | W 101–86 | Marcio Lassiter (21) | June Mar Fajardo (14) | Chris Ross (5) | Cuneta Astrodome | 5–1 |

January : 5–0

| Game | Date | Opponent | Score | High points | High rebounds | High assists | Location Attendance | Record |
|---|---|---|---|---|---|---|---|---|
| 7 | January 6 | Blackwater | W 118–93 | June Mar Fajardo (25) | Cabagnot, Ross (9) | Chris Ross (11) | Mall of Asia Arena | 6–1 |
| 8 | January 8 | Barangay Ginebra | W 72–70 | Alex Cabagnot (16) | Marcio Lassiter (13) | Marcio Lassiter (4) | Smart Araneta Coliseum | 7–1 |
| 9 | January 13 | Rain or Shine | W 107–101 (OT) | June Mar Fajardo (25) | June Mar Fajardo (17) | Ross, Santos (5) | Mall of Asia Arena | 8–1 |
| 10 | January 21 | GlobalPort | W 106–100 | Arwind Santos (31) | June Mar Fajardo (15) | Chris Ross (9) | Hoops Dome | 9–1 |
| 11 | January 28 | TNT | W 98–94 | June Mar Fajardo (20) | June Mar Fajardo (22) | Chris Ross (9) | Ynares Center | 10–1 |

2016–17 schedule

=== Playoffs ===
==== Bracket ====
Quarterfinals
(#1 twice-to-beat)
1 | San Miguel | 98
8 | Rain or Shine | 91
(Best-of-3)
4 | TNT | 2
5 | GlobalPort | 0
(#2 twice-to-beat)
2 | Alaska | 81 | 97
7 | Barangay Ginebra | 85 | 108
(Best-of-3)
3 | Star | 2
6 | Phoenix | 0

Semifinals (Best-of-7)
1 | San Miguel | 4
4 | TNT | 3
7 | Barangay Ginebra | 4
3 | Star | 3

Finals (Best-of-7)
1 | San Miguel | 4
7 | Barangay Ginebra | 1

==== Game log ====
2017 PBA Philippine Cup playoffs game log
Total: 9–4
Quarterfinals: 1–0

| Game | Date | Opponent | Score | High points | High rebounds | High assists | Location Attendance | Series |
|---|---|---|---|---|---|---|---|---|
| 1 | February 5 | Rain or Shine | W 98–91 | RR Garcia (25) | June Mar Fajardo (14) | Chris Ross (4) | Ynares Center | 1–0 |

Semifinals: 4–3

| Game | Date | Opponent | Score | High points | High rebounds | High assists | Location Attendance | Series |
|---|---|---|---|---|---|---|---|---|
| 1 | February 8 | TNT | W 111–98 | Marcio Lassiter (22) | Fajardo, Lassiter (8) | Chris Ross (10) | Smart Araneta Coliseum | 1–0 |
| 2 | February 10 | TNT | L 85–87 | June Mar Fajardo (25) | Arwind Santos (12) | Chris Ross (7) | Mall of Asia Arena | 1–1 |
| 3 | February 12 | TNT | L 92–98 | Cabagnot, Lassiter (18) | Fajardo, Lassiter, Ross (9) | Alex Cabagnot (7) | Smart Araneta Coliseum | 1–2 |
| 4 | February 14 | TNT | W 97–86 | Chris Ross (31) | June Mar Fajardo (15) | Marcio Lassiter (10) | Mall of Asia Arena | 2–2 |
| 5 | February 16 | TNT | L 94–101 | Arwind Santos (18) | June Mar Fajardo (15) | Cabagnot, Lassiter, Ross (4) | Smart Araneta Coliseum | 2–3 |
| 6 | February 18 | TNT | W 104–88 | June Mar Fajardo (23) | June Mar Fajardo (21) | Cabagnot, Lassiter (7) | Mall of Asia Arena | 3–3 |
| 7 | February 20 | TNT | W 96–83 | Fajardo, Santos (22) | June Mar Fajardo (19) | Chris Ross (10) | Mall of Asia Arena | 4–3 |

Finals: 4–1

| Game | Date | Opponent | Score | High points | High rebounds | High assists | Location Attendance | Series |
|---|---|---|---|---|---|---|---|---|
| 1 | February 24 | Barangay Ginebra | W 109–82 | Fajardo, Ross (17) | June Mar Fajardo (8) | Chris Ross (8) | Mall of Asia Arena | 1–0 |
| 2 | February 26 | Barangay Ginebra | L 118–124 (OT) | Arwind Santos (23) | Arwind Santos (15) | Chris Ross (11) | Quezon Convention Center; 8,000 | 1–1 |
| 3 | March 1 | Barangay Ginebra | W 99–88 | Chris Ross (24) | June Mar Fajardo (18) | Chris Ross (8) | Smart Araneta Coliseum; 16,773 | 2–1 |
| 4 | March 3 | Barangay Ginebra | W 94–85 | Fajardo, Lassiter (20) | June Mar Fajardo (13) | Chris Ross (9) | Smart Araneta Coliseum; 17,146 | 3–1 |
| 5 | March 5 | Barangay Ginebra | W 91–85 | Fajardo, Santos (21) | Ross, Santos (8) | Chris Ross (10) | Smart Araneta Coliseum; 20,217 | 4–1 |

2016–17 schedule

== Commissioner's Cup ==
=== Eliminations ===
==== Standings ====
| Pos | Team | W | L | PCT | GB | Qualification |
|---|---|---|---|---|---|---|
| 1 | Barangay Ginebra San Miguel | 9 | 2 | .818 (Note: Head-to-head quotient: Barangay Ginebra 1.117, San Miguel 0.990, Star 0.903) | — | Twice-to-beat in the quarterfinals |
| 2 | San Miguel Beermen | 9 | 2 | .818 | — | Twice-to-beat in the quarterfinals |
| 3 | Star Hotshots | 9 | 2 | .818 | — | Best-of-three quarterfinals |
| 4 | TNT KaTropa | 8 | 3 | .727 | 1 | Best-of-three quarterfinals |
| 5 | Meralco Bolts | 7 | 4 | .636 | 2 | Best-of-three quarterfinals |
| 6 | Rain or Shine Elasto Painters | 5 | 6 | .455 | 4 | Best-of-three quarterfinals |
| 7 | Phoenix Fuel Masters | 4 | 7 | .364 (Note: Head-to-head quotient: Phoenix 1.127, Alaska 1.116, GlobalPort 0.791; eighth seed playoff: GlobalPort 107–106 Alaska) | 5 | Twice-to-win in the quarterfinals |
| 8 | GlobalPort Batang Pier | 4 | 7 | .364 | 5 | Twice-to-win in the quarterfinals |
| 9 | Alaska Aces | 4 | 7 | .364 | 5 | |
| 10 | Mahindra Floodbuster | 3 | 8 | .273 | 6 | |
| 11 | Blackwater Elite | 2 | 9 | .182 (Note: Head-to-head record: Blackwater 1–0 NLEX) | 7 | |
| 12 | NLEX Road Warriors | 2 | 9 | .182 | 7 | |

Source: PBA.ph

==== Game log ====
2017 PBA Commissioner's Cup game log
Total: 9–2
April: 5–0

| Game | Date | Opponent | Score | High points | High rebounds | High assists | Location Attendance | Record |
|---|---|---|---|---|---|---|---|---|
| 1 | April 2 | Meralco | W 99–92 | June Mar Fajardo (24) | Fajardo, Rhodes (12) | Alex Cabagnot (9) | Smart Araneta Coliseum | 1–0 |
| 2 | April 7 | Phoenix | W 110–88 | June Mar Fajardo (22) | Rhodes, Santos (10) | Alex Cabagnot (7) | Mall of Asia Arena | 2–0 |
| 3 | April 16 | Star | W 103–97 | Charles Rhodes (29) | June Mar Fajardo (11) | Cabagnot, Ross (4) | Smart Araneta Coliseum | 3–0 |
| 4 | April 19 | Mahindra | W 109–80 | Alex Cabagnot (26) | Charles Rhodes (18) | Cabagnot, Rhodes (4) | Cuneta Astrodome | 4–0 |
| 5 | April 22 | Rain or Shine | W 111–98 | Charles Rhodes (26) | Alex Cabagnot (9) | Alex Cabagnot (7) | Mall of Asia Arena | 5–0 |
All-Star Break

May : 3–2

| Game | Date | Opponent | Score | High points | High rebounds | High assists | Location Attendance | Record |
|---|---|---|---|---|---|---|---|---|
| 6 | May 5 | TNT | L 103–112 | Charles Rhodes (43) | Cabagnot, Lassiter, Rhodes (8) | Chris Ross (10) | Smart Araneta Coliseum | 5–1 |
| 7 | May 19 | NLEX | W 114–112 | Charles Rhodes (37) | Charles Rhodes (19) | Chris Ross (11) | Cuneta Astrodome | 6–1 |
| 8 | May 21 | Barangay Ginebra | L 99–107 | Charles Rhodes (26) | June Mar Fajardo (14) | Chris Ross (9) | Mall of Asia Arena | 6–2 |
| 9 | May 27 | Alaska | W 109–97 | Alex Cabagnot (25) | Cabagnot, Rhodes (10) | Chris Ross (10) | Ynares Center | 7–2 |
| 10 | May 31 | Blackwater | W 124–113 | Charles Rhodes (32) | Charles Rhodes (9) | Chris Ross (13) | Cuneta Astrodome | 8–2 |

June : 1–0

| Game | Date | Opponent | Score | High points | High rebounds | High assists | Location Attendance | Record |
|---|---|---|---|---|---|---|---|---|
| 11 | June 2 | GlobalPort | W 112–101 | Charles Rhodes (34) | Alex Cabagnot (10) | Chris Ross (7) | Smart Araneta Coliseum | 9–2 |

2016–17 schedule

=== Playoffs ===
==== Bracket ====
Quarterfinals
(#1 twice-to-beat)
1 | Barangay Ginebra | 96
8 | GlobalPort | 85
(Best-of-3)
4 | TNT | 2
5 | Meralco | 1
(#2 twice-to-beat)
2 | San Miguel | 115
7 | Phoenix | 96
(Best-of-3)
3 | Star | 2
6 | Rain or Shine | 0

Semifinals (Best-of-5)
1 | Barangay Ginebra | 1
4 | TNT | 3
2 | San Miguel | 3
3 | Star | 1

Finals (Best-of-7)
4 | TNT | 2
2 | San Miguel | 4

==== Game log ====
2017 PBA Commissioner's Cup playoffs game log
Total: 8–3
Quarterfinals: 1–0

| Game | Date | Opponent | Score | High points | High rebounds | High assists | Location Attendance | Series |
|---|---|---|---|---|---|---|---|---|
| 1 | June 6 | Phoenix | W 115–96 | Marcio Lassiter (26) | Charles Rhodes (11) | Chris Ross (10) | Smart Araneta Coliseum | 1–0 |

Semifinals: 3–1

| Game | Date | Opponent | Score | High points | High rebounds | High assists | Location Attendance | Series |
|---|---|---|---|---|---|---|---|---|
| 1 | June 10 | Star | L 105–109 | Charles Rhodes (34) | Rhodes, Ross (10) | Chris Ross (15) | Smart Araneta Coliseum | 0–1 |
| 2 | June 12 | Star | W 77–76 | Charles Rhodes (21) | Charles Rhodes (10) | Lassiter, Ross (4) | Mall of Asia Arena | 1–1 |
| 3 | June 14 | Star | W 111–110 | Charles Rhodes (36) | Fajardo, Ross (8) | Chris Ross (8) | Smart Araneta Coliseum | 2–1 |
| 4 | June 12 | Star | W 109–102 | Alex Cabagnot (26) | Charles Rhodes (10) | Chris Ross (10) | Mall of Asia Arena | 3–1 |

Finals: 4–2

| Game | Date | Opponent | Score | High points | High rebounds | High assists | Location Attendance | Series |
|---|---|---|---|---|---|---|---|---|
| 1 | June 21 | TNT | L 102–104 | Charles Rhodes (31) | Fajardo, Rhodes (13) | Chris Ross (12) | Smart Araneta Coliseum | 0–1 |
| 2 | June 23 | TNT | W 102–88 | June Mar Fajardo (22) | Fajardo, Rhodes (11) | Chris Ross (9) | Smart Araneta Coliseum | 1–1 |
| 3 | June 25 | TNT | W 109–97 | Alex Cabagnot (28) | Charles Rhodes (20) | Marcio Lassiter (7) | Smart Araneta Coliseum | 2–1 |
| 4 | June 28 | TNT | L 97–102 | Charles Rhodes (22) | June Mar Fajardo (9) | Alex Cabagnot (5) | Smart Araneta Coliseum | 2–2 |
| 5 | June 30 | TNT | W 111–102 | Alex Cabagnot (28) | Charles Rhodes (14) | Chris Ross (11) | Smart Araneta Coliseum | 3–2 |
| 6 | July 2 | TNT | W 115–91 | Charles Rhodes (30) | Alex Cabagnot (12) | Alex Cabagnot (11) | Smart Araneta Coliseum | 4–2 |

2016–17 schedule

== Governors' Cup ==
=== Eliminations ===
==== Standings ====
| Pos | Team | W | L | PCT | GB | Qualification |
|---|---|---|---|---|---|---|
| 1 | Meralco Bolts | 9 | 2 | .818 | — | Twice-to-beat in the quarterfinals |
| 2 | TNT KaTropa | 8 | 3 | .727 (Note: Head-to-head record: Talk 'N Text 1–0 Barangay Ginebra) | 1 | Twice-to-beat in the quarterfinals |
| 3 | Barangay Ginebra San Miguel | 8 | 3 | .727 | 1 | Twice-to-beat in the quarterfinals |
| 4 | Star Hotshots | 7 | 4 | .636 (Note: Head to-head quotient: Star 1.04, NLEX 1.01, San Miguel 0.99, Rain or Shine 0.96) | 2 | Twice-to-beat in the quarterfinals |
| 5 | NLEX Road Warriors | 7 | 4 | .636 | 2 | Twice-to-win in the quarterfinals |
| 6 | San Miguel Beermen | 7 | 4 | .636 | 2 | Twice-to-win in the quarterfinals |
| 7 | Rain or Shine Elasto Painters | 7 | 4 | .636 | 2 | Twice-to-win in the quarterfinals |
| 8 | Blackwater Elite | 5 | 6 | .455 | 4 | Twice-to-win in the quarterfinals |
| 9 | Alaska Aces | 3 | 8 | .273 (Note: Head-to-head record: Alaska 1–0 GlobalPort) | 6 | |
| 10 | GlobalPort Batang Pier | 3 | 8 | .273 | 6 | |
| 11 | Phoenix Fuel Masters | 2 | 9 | .182 | 7 | |
| 12 | Kia Picanto | 0 | 11 | .000 | 9 | |

Source: PBA.ph

==== Game log ====
2017 PBA Governors' Cup game log
Total: 7–4
July: 1–0

| Game | Date | Opponent | Score | High points | High rebounds | High assists | Location Attendance | Record |
|---|---|---|---|---|---|---|---|---|
| 1 | July 29 | Blackwater | W 118–93 | Lassiter, McKines (19) | Wendell McKines (12) | three players (5) | Ynares Center | 1–0 |

August : 2–2

| Game | Date | Opponent | Score | High points | High rebounds | High assists | Location Attendance | Record |
|---|---|---|---|---|---|---|---|---|
| 2 | August 2 | TNT | W 97–91 | June Mar Fajardo (27) | Wendell McKines (9) | Chris Ross (10) | Smart Araneta Coliseum | 2–0 |
| 3 | August 4 | Star | L 98–104 | Wendell McKines (27) | Wendell McKines (22) | Chris Ross (8) | Smart Araneta Coliseum | 2–1 |
| 4 | August 25 | GlobalPort | W 115–112 | Wendell McKines (35) | Wendell McKines (14) | McKines, Ross (7) | Smart Araneta Coliseum | 3–1 |
| 5 | August 27 | NLEX | L 100–103 | Wendell McKines (28) | Wendell McKines (14) | Chris Ross (11) | Smart Araneta Coliseum | 3–2 |

September: 4–2

| Game | Date | Opponent | Score | High points | High rebounds | High assists | Location Attendance | Record |
|---|---|---|---|---|---|---|---|---|
| 6 | September 2 | Alaska | L 79–90 | Arwind Santos (29) | June Mar Fajardo (14) | Chris Ross (4) | Angeles University Foundation Sports Arena | 3–3 |
| 7 | September 6 | Rain or Shine | W 103–96 | Chris Ross (27) | June Mar Fajardo (14) | Gabby Espinas (5) | Smart Araneta Coliseum | 4–3 |
| 8 | September 10 | Barangay Ginebra | W 107–103 | Terrence Watson (28) | Terrence Watson (17) | Cabagnot, Ross (5) | Smart Araneta Coliseum | 5–3 |
| 9 | September 16 | Kia | W 118–112 | June Mar Fajardo (41) | June Mar Fajardo (17) | Alex Cabagnot (8) | Mall of Asia Arena | 6–3 |
| 10 | September 20 | Phoenix | W 109–107 | Terrence Watson (26) | June Mar Fajardo (17) | Alex Cabagnot (6) | Ynares Center | 7–3 |
| 11 | September 24 | Meralco | L 101–104 | June Mar Fajardo (26) | Terrence Watson (10) | Cabagnot, Ross (7) | Smart Araneta Coliseum | 7–4 |

2016–17 schedule

=== Playoffs ===
==== Bracket ====
Quarterfinals (Top 4 twice-to-beat)
1 | Meralco | 91 | 104
8 | Blackwater | 92 | 96
4 | Star | 89
5 | NLEX | 77
2 | TNT | 102 | 118
7 | Rain or Shine | 106 | 114
3 | Barangay Ginebra | 104
6 | San Miguel | 84

Semifinals (Best-of-5)
1 | Meralco | 3
4 | Star | 0
2 | TNT | 1
3 | Barangay Ginebra | 3

Finals (Best-of-7)
1 | Meralco | 3
3 | Barangay Ginebra | 4

==== Game log ====
2017 PBA Governors' Cup playoffs game log
Total: 0–1
Quarterfinals: 0–1

| Game | Date | Opponent | Score | High points | High rebounds | High assists | Location Attendance | Record |
|---|---|---|---|---|---|---|---|---|
| 1 | September 27 | Barangay Ginebra | L 84–104 | Terrence Watson (30) | June Mar Fajardo (22) | Chris Ross (7) | Mall of Asia Arena | 0–1 |

2016–17 schedule

== Transactions ==
=== Trades ===
==== Pre-season ====
November
| November 3, 2016 | To San Miguel Keith Agovida (from Mahindra); RR Garcia (from Star) | To Mahindra Ryan Araña (from San Miguel); 2018 1st round pick (from San Miguel); Alex Mallari (from Star) | To Star Aldrech Ramos (from Mahindra); 2017 2nd round pick (from Star via NLEX) |

==== Commissioner's Cup ====
April
| April 24, 2017 | To San Miguel Matt Ganuelas-Rosser | To TNT RR Garcia |

==== Governors' Cup ====
July
| July 10, 2017 | To San Miguel Von Pessumal | To GlobalPort Arnold Van Opstal |

=== Rookie signings ===
| Player | Number | Position | Date signed | School/club team |
|---|---|---|---|---|
| Arnold Van Opstal | 7 | Center | November 15 | DLSU |
| Rashawn McCarthy | 10 | Guard | November 15 | SUNY-Old Westbury |

=== Free agency ===
==== Addition ====
| Player | Number | Position | Date Signed | Notes |
|---|---|---|---|---|
| Michael Mabulac | 28 | Forward | January 5, 2017 | Signed by SMB in lieu of David Semerad who has been relegated to team's Injured/reserved list. |

==== Subtraction ====
| Player | Number | Position | Reason left | New Team |
|---|---|---|---|---|
| Gary David | 20 | Guard | Waived | Mahindra Floodbuster |
| Nelbert Omolon | 21 | Forward | Retired | —N/a |
| Michael Mabulac | 28 | Forward | Waived | San Miguel Beermen |
| Chris Lutz | 3 | Guard | UFAWR2S | Meralco Bolts |

=== Recruited imports ===
| Conference | Name | Country | Number | Debuted | Last game | Record |
|---|---|---|---|---|---|---|
| Commissioner's Cup | Charles Rhodes | (United States) | 0 | April 2 (vs. Meralco) | July 2 (vs. TNT) | 17–5 |
| Governors' Cup | Wendell McKines | (United States) | 18 | July 29 (vs. Blackwater) | August 27 (vs. NLEX) | 3–2 |
| Governors' Cup | Terik Bridgeman | (United States) | 10 | September 2 (vs. Alaska) | September 6 (vs. Rain or Shine) | 1–1 |
| Governors' Cup | Terrence Watson | (United States) | 24 | September 10 (vs. Barangay Ginebra) | September 27 (vs. Barangay Ginebra) | 3–2 |

== Awards ==
| Recipient | Award | Date awarded | Ref. |
|---|---|---|---|
| Alex Cabagnot | Philippine Cup Player of the Week | January 7, 2017 | |
| June Mar Fajardo | Philippine Cup Best Player of the Conference | March 3, 2017 | |
| Chris Ross | Philippine Cup Finals Most Valuable Player | March 5, 2017 | |
| Chris Ross | Commissioner's Cup Player of the Week | June 5, 2017 | |
| Chris Ross | Commissioner's Cup Best Player of the Conference | June 28, 2017 | |
| Charles Rhodes | Commissioner's Cup Best Import of the Conference | June 28, 2017 | |
| Alex Cabagnot | Commissioner's Cup Finals Most Valuable Player | July 2, 2017 | |
| Chris Ross | Governors' Cup Player of the Week | September 11, 2017 | |
| Chris Ross | Most Improved Player Award | October 20, 2017 | |
| June Mar Fajardo | Most Valuable Player Award | October 20, 2017 | |
Honors
| June Mar Fajardo | All-Defensive Team | October 20, 2017 | |
| Chris Ross | All-Defensive Team | October 20, 2017 | |
| June Mar Fajardo | First Mythical Team | October 20, 2017 | |
| Chris Ross | First Mythical Team | October 20, 2017 | |
| Alex Cabagnot | First Mythical Team | October 20, 2017 | |
| Arwind Santos | First Mythical Team | October 20, 2017 | |
