= Arnold Van Opstal =

Filipino-German basketball player

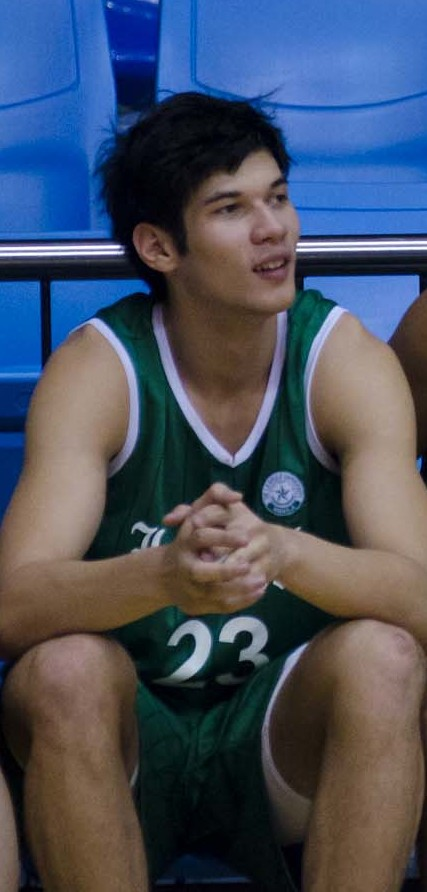
- Van Opstal in 2011

Personal information
- Born: December 15, 1991 (age 34) Germany
- Listed height: 6 ft 9 in (2.06 m)
- Listed weight: 220 lb (100 kg)

Career information
- High school: De La Salle Zobel (Muntinlupa)
- College: De La Salle
- PBA draft: 2016: Special draft
- Drafted by: San Miguel Beermen
- Playing career: 2016–2018
- Position: Center

Career history
- 2016–2017: San Miguel Beermen
- 2017–2018: GlobalPort Batang Pier

Career highlights
- 2× PBA champion (2016–17 Philippine, 2017 Commissioner's); PBA All-Star (2017)

Arnold Van Opstal (born December 15, 1991) is a Filipino-German former professional basketball player. He played for two teams in the Philippine Basketball Association (PBA). He also played for the Philippine national basketball team in international competitions. Van Opstal played for the De La Salle University in the college level.

== Early life ==
Arnold Van Opstal was born on December 15, 1991, Germany. He was born to Heinz, a German who was the former PAL general manager of Europe and Luzviminda Llantero who works at the Department of Foreign Affairs as head of the Machine Readable Passport Personalization Center of the Office of Consular Affairs. Van Opstal also has a brother named Christopher who is a lawyer by the age of 23 and a graduate of the University of Technology Sydney.

Arnold Van Opstal studied at De La Salle Zobel from kindergarten to Grade 1 before relocating abroad with his family. His family resided in various places abroad such as in Bonn in Germany, The Hague in the Netherlands, Berlin, and then to Sydney, Australia due to his mother's foreign postings. In 2007, a year after Van Opstal's father died, his family moved backed to Manila after his mother received a Philippine-based assignment.

He re-enrolled in De La Salle Zobel as a high school student and later enrolled at De La Salle University for his collegiate studies to pursue a degree in International Studies.

== High school career ==
Van Opstal was scouted by Jack Rodriguez who was a former La Salle varsity player who encouraged him to re-enroll at De La Salle Zobel. Van Opstal managed to earn a place for the school's junior varsity team for the 2008–09 season and was supposed to be named Rookie of the Year but was disqualified after he was ejected for retaliating during a game against the University of Santo Tomas. He spent a year-off from basketball to finish his studies at Zobel due to the non-honoring of his Australian credits.

== College career ==
Van Opstal played for the De La Salle Green Archers while in college. He was a key player when the Green Archers won the UAAP title in 2013. However, in July 2015, he opted out of his remaining playing year with the Green Archers due to a recurring Achilles' heel injury.

== Amateur career ==
Van Opstal played at the PBA D-League while still playing with De La Salle. He played for the Hapee Fresh Fighters at the 2014–15 PBA D-League Aspirant's Cup but was later relegated to the reserve list by due to injuries. In May 2015, he signed to Cebuana Lhuillier Gems and left Hapee. He played in five games for Cebuana.

== Professional career ==
Before entering the 2016 PBA Draft, Van Opstal went to various places such as England and Thailand to regain form. He also trained in the United States in March 2016.

=== San Miguel Beermen ===
After his stint with Gilas Pilipinas, Van Opstal and other members of the Gilas Cadets program were placed in a special draft during the 2016 PBA Draft. There he was selected by the San Miguel Beermen. He joined a team that had a frontcourt rotation of June Mar Fajardo, Yancy De Ocampo, Gabby Espinas and Jay-R Reyes. Rarely getting minutes, he scored his first points in a win over the Blackwater Elite and finished with six points and a rebound. As a member of the Gilas cadets, he was got to play in the All-Star Games during the 2017 All-Star Week. He played two conferences with the Beermen, winning championships in both the Philippine and the Commissioner's Cup.

=== GlobalPort Batang Pier ===
On July 10, 2017, Van Opstal was traded to the GlobalPort Batang Pier for Gilas cadet Von Pessumal. Although Gilas cadets weren't allowed to be traded for at least two years, a clause was included that allowed for cadet-for-cadet trades.

Before the start of the Governors' Cup, Van Opstal tore his meniscus, requiring surgery. His contract expired in 2018. Since then, he has stopped playing competitive basketball.

== Career stats ==
=== PBA ===
| Year | Team | GP | MPG | FG% | 3P% | FT% | RPG | APG | SPG | BPG | PPG |
|---|---|---|---|---|---|---|---|---|---|---|---|
| 2016–17 | San Miguel | 10 | 3.0 | .500 | .000 | .538 | 1.4 | .0 | .0 | .1 | 1.5 |
| 2016–17 | GlobalPort | 10 | 3.0 | .500 | .000 | .538 | 1.4 | .0 | .0 | .1 | 1.5 |
| Career | | 10 | 3.0 | .500 | .000 | .538 | 1.4 | .0 | .0 | .1 | 1.5 |

=== College ===
==== Elimination rounds ====
| Year | Team | GP | MPG | FG% | 3P% | FT% | RPG | APG | SPG | BPG | PPG |
|---|---|---|---|---|---|---|---|---|---|---|---|
| 2011–12 | La Salle | 14 | 16.0 | .500 | .000 | .553 | 2.9 | .9 | .0 | .6 | 6.4 |
| 2012–13 | La Salle | 14 | 16.3 | .510 | .000 | .633 | 5.2 | .3 | .1 | .4 | 4.9 |
| 2013–14 | La Salle | 14 | 22.8 | .500 | .000 | .633 | 6.3 | .7 | .0 | .9 | 9.3 |
| 2014–15 | La Salle | 10 | 20.8 | .556 | .000 | .541 | 5.6 | 1.5 | .0 | .5 | 8.0 |
| Career | | 52 | 18.8 | .513 | .000 | .594 | 4.9 | .8 | .0 | .6 | 7.1 |

==== Playoffs ====
| Year | Team | GP | MPG | FG% | 3P% | FT% | RPG | APG | SPG | BPG | PPG |
|---|---|---|---|---|---|---|---|---|---|---|---|
| 2013–14 | La Salle | 5 | 27.8 | .556 | .000 | .409 | 7.8 | 1.6 | .0 | 1.0 | 9.8 |
| 2014–15 | La Salle | 3 | 22.3 | .471 | .000 | .400 | 7.7 | .7 | .3 | .7 | 7.3 |
| Career | | 8 | 25.8 | .528 | .000 | 405 | 7.8 | 1.3 | .1 | .9 | 8.9 |

== International career ==
After recovering from an Achilles' heel injury in August 2016, Van Opstal expressed his commitment to play for the Philippine national basketball team. He was part of the squad that participated at the 2016 FIBA Asia Challenge.

== Personal life ==
Van Opstal is an advocate for LGBTQ+ rights. He is straight and his brother is gay.

Van Opstal used to do modeling work. He and Ateneo basketball player Kiefer Ravena appeared together on the cover of an issue of Chalk Magazine. He also appeared solo on the cover of a Garage magazine in 2015. In 2014, he and teammate Jeron Teng appeared in Bench's 'Naked Truth' fashion show. In 2021, he opened an OnlyFans account.
