= Von Pessumal =

Filipino basketball player

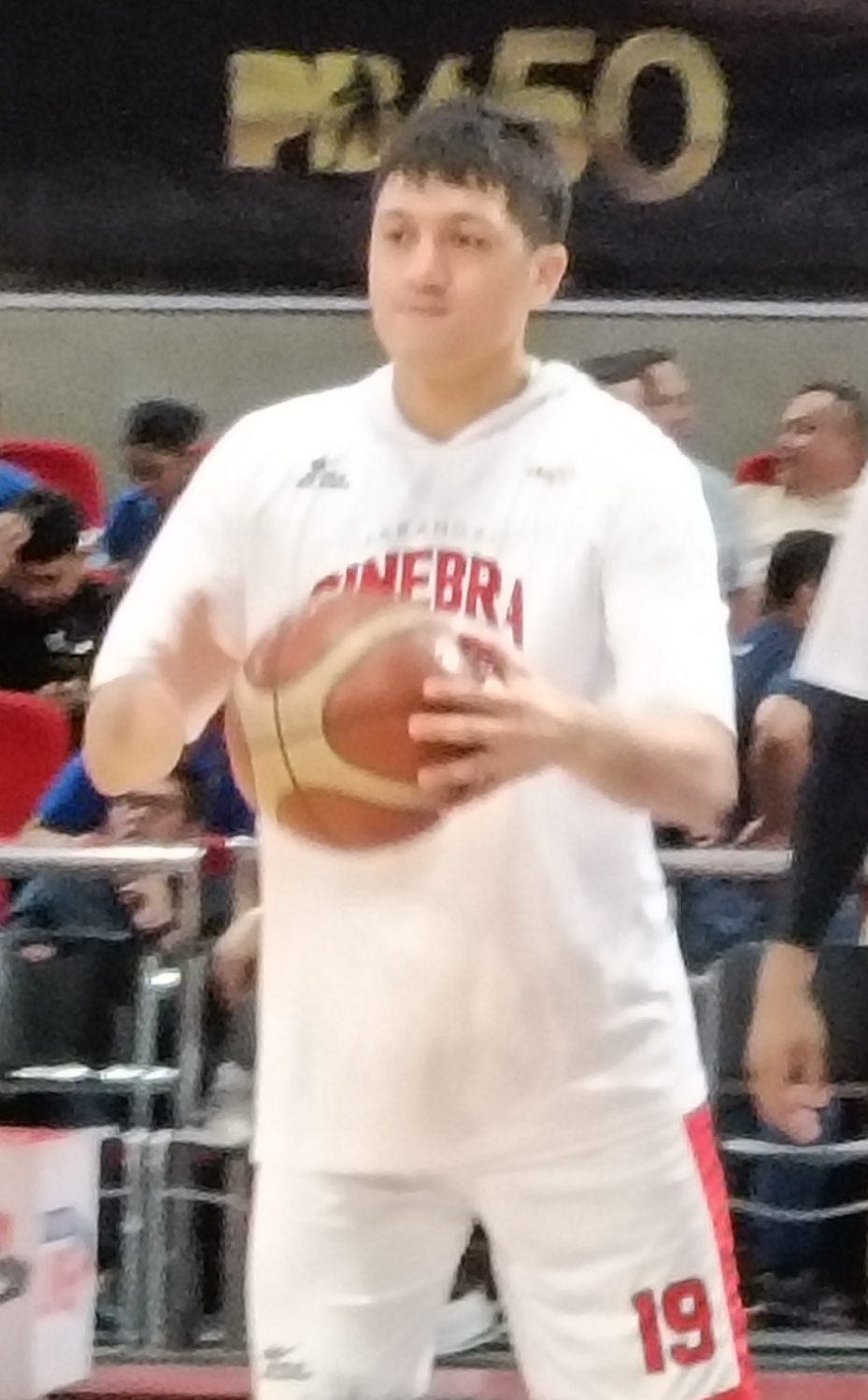
- Pessumal in 2025

No. 19 – Titan Ultra Giant Risers
- Position: Shooting guard / small forward
- League: PBA

Personal information
- Born: February 12, 1993 (age 33)
- Listed height: 6 ft 2 in (1.88 m)
- Listed weight: 185 lb (84 kg)

Career information
- High school: Ateneo (Quezon City)
- College: Ateneo (2011–2015)
- PBA draft: 2016: Special draft
- Drafted by: GlobalPort Batang Pier
- Playing career: 2016–present

Career history
- 2016–2017: GlobalPort Batang Pier
- 2017–2022: San Miguel Beermen
- 2022–2025: Barangay Ginebra San Miguel
- 2025–present: Titan Ultra Giant Risers

Career highlights
- 5× PBA champion (2017–18 Philippine, 2019 Philippine, 2019 Commissioner's, 2022 Philippine, 2022–23 PBA Commissioner's); PBA All-Star (2017); 2× UAAP Seniors champion (2011, 2012); Unigames champion (2014); FilOil Flying V Cup champion (2011)

Von Rolfe Villaseñor Pessumal (born February 12, 1993) is a Filipino professional basketball player for the Titan Ultra Giant Risers of the Philippine Basketball Association (PBA). He played college basketball for the Ateneo Blue Eagles.

== College career ==
Pessumal played college ball at the Ateneo de Manila University, and was a part of two championships for the Blue Eagles. He ended his college playing career in 2015. He made a name for himself in the Seniors division as a sharpshooter, who also had the ability to put the ball on the floor and finish at the rim.

== Amateur career ==
=== PBA D-League ===
Pessumal is one of the 215 aspirants for the 2015 PBA D-League draft, which took place on December 1, 2015. He was drafted third overall by the Tanduay Light Rhum Masters in the PBA D-League draft held at PBA Café in Metrowalk, Pasig City.

== Professional career ==
In October 2016, Pessumal was drafted by the GlobalPort Batang Pier from Special Draft.

In July 2017, Pessumal was traded by the GlobalPort Batang Pier to San Miguel Beermen in exchange for seldom used Arnold Van Opstal.

On January 27, 2019, Pessumal recorded 23 points and 6 3-pointers in a 93–104 losing effort the TNT Katropa. In June 2019, he set the PBA record for most threes made in a game without missing, going 8 for 8 in another loss to the TNT Katropa, this time the score 110–97.

On September 20, 2022, Pessumal was traded to the Barangay Ginebra San Miguel in a three-team trade involving Barangay Ginebra, San Miguel, and NorthPort Batang Pier.

On September 18, 2025, Pessumal signed a one-year contract with the NorthPort Batang Pier (later becoming the Titan Ultra Giant Risers).

== Career statistics ==
=== PBA ===
Legend
GP	Games played	MPG	Minutes per game	FG%	Field-goal percentage
3FG%	3-point field-goal percentage	4P%	4-point field-goal percentage	FT%	Free-throw percentage
RPG	Rebounds per game	APG	Assists per game	SPG	Steals per game
BPG	Blocks per game	PPG	Points per game	**127**	Career high

As of the end of 2025–26 season

==== Season-by-season averages ====
Year	Team	GP	MPG	FG%	3P%	4P%	FT%	RPG	APG	SPG	BPG	PPG
2016–17	GlobalPort	31	13.6	.320	.333	—	**.929**	1.9	.5	.2	.1	4.4
2016–17	San Miguel	31	13.6	.320	.333	—	**.929**	1.9	.5	.2	.1	4.4
2017–18	San Miguel	37	10.7	.358	.291	—	.546	1.0	.4	.2	**.2**	3.5
2019	San Miguel	**60**	15.0	**.417**	**.406**	—	.750	1.6	.4	.4	**.2**	5.7
2020	San Miguel	13	**16.8**	.345	.312	—	.692	**2.6**	**.8**	**.5**	—	**6.6**
2021	San Miguel	23	12.7	.355	.299	—	.700	1.4	.6	.4	.1	4.0
2022–23	San Miguel	43	6.2	.337	.324	—	.688	.7	.2	.2	—	2.4
2022–23	Barangay Ginebra	43	6.2	.337	.324	—	.688	.7	.2	.2	—	2.4
2023–24	Barangay Ginebra	21	7.7	.275	.256	—	.857	.6	.1	.1	—	2.1
2024–25	Barangay Ginebra	21	6.1	.292	.250	**.333**	.600	.8	.5	.1	—	2.2
2025–26	Titan Ultra	32	13.8	.320	.257	.304	.737	1.5	.5	.3	**.2**	5.9
Career		281	11.5	.353	.331	.309	.746	1.3	.4	.3	.1	4.2

=== College ===
Legend
GP	Games played	MPG	Minutes per game
FG%	Field-goal percentage	3P%	3-point field-goal percentage	FT%	Free-throw percentage
RPG	Rebounds per game	APG	Assists per game	SPG	Steals per game
BPG	Blocks per game	PPG	Points per game	**Bold**	Career high

†	Denotes seasons in which Pessumal won a UAAP Basketball Championship
**Bold**	Denotes career highs

Year	Team	GP	MPG	FG%	3P%	FT%	RPG	APG	SPG	BPG	PPG
2011-12†	Ateneo	7	2.0	.000	.000	.500	.4	.4	.0	.0	0.1
2012-13†	Ateneo	10	6.3	.167	.111	.500	.1	.0	.0	.0	0.8
2013-14	Ateneo	14	15.7	.354	.282	**.909**	2.9	.9	.2	**.2**	5.5
2014-15	Ateneo	**16**	25.6	.373	**.380**	.789	**4.0**	.9	**.5**	**.2**	9.1
2015-16	Ateneo	13	**30.2**	**.390**	.430	.794	2.3	**2.5**	1.2	**1.2**	**17.2**

== Personal life ==
Since 2014, Pessumal has been in a relationship with former UAAP courtside reporter and beauty queen Laura Lehmann. They were both students at the Ateneo de Manila University when they first met. In May 2020, they announced their engagement after being together for five years. On May 23, 2021, he announced his marriage to Lehmann, which was solemnized in a civil ceremony earlier that year.
