= 2016–17 TNT KaTropa season =

- Head coach: Nash Racela
- General manager: Virgil Villavicencio; Magnum Membrere (assistant)
- Owners: Smart Communications (an MVP Group subsidiary)

Philippine Cup results
- Record: 6–5 (54.5%)
- Place: 4th
- Playoff finish: Semifinalist (lost to San Miguel, 3–4)

Commissioner's Cup results
- Record: 8–3 (72.7%)
- Place: 4th
- Playoff finish: Runner-up (lost to San Miguel, 2–4)

Governors' Cup results
- Record: 8–3 (72.7%)
- Place: 2nd
- Playoff finish: Semifinalist (lost to Barangay Ginebra, 1–3)

TNT KaTropa seasons

The 2016–17 TNT KaTropa season was the 27th season of the franchise in the Philippine Basketball Association (PBA).

== Key dates ==
- October 22, 2016: TNT KaTropa appointed Nash Racela to be its head coach replacing Jong Uichico.
- October 30: The 2016 PBA draft took place at Midtown Atrium, Robinson Place Manila.

== Draft picks ==
=== Special draft ===
Player	Position	Nationality	PBA D-League team	College
Roger Pogoy	G/F	Philippines	Phoenix Accelerators	FEU

=== Regular draft ===
Round	Pick	Player	Position	Nationality	PBA D-League team	College
4	22	Timothy Habelito	F	New Zealand	Cafe France Bakers	QUT
5	24	Mikee Reyes	G	Philippines	Junior Powerade Tigers	UP
6	25	Levi Hernandez	G	Philippines	Fruitas Shakers	Arellano

== Roster ==
2016–17 TNT KaTropa roster
Players
Coaches

Pos.	#	POB	Name	Height	Weight	DOB (YYYY–MM–DD)	From
F/C	2	(Philippines)	Frank Golla	6 ft 5 in (1.96 m)	290 lb (132 kg)	1990–01–17	Ateneo
F	4	(United States)	Harvey Carey	6 ft 3 in (1.91 m)	210 lb (95 kg)	1979–03–18	Sonoma State
G/F	6	(Philippines)	Alex Nuyles	6 ft 2 in (1.88 m)	199 lb (90 kg)	1989–07–05	Adamson
F/C	7	(United States)	Moala Tautuaa	6 ft 8 in (2.03 m)	245 lb (111 kg)	1989–04–30	Chadron State
G	8	(Philippines)	RR Garcia	5 ft 11 in (1.80 m)	165 lb (75 kg)	1990–01–12	Far Eastern
G	9	(Philippines)	Levi Hernandez (R)	6 ft 1 in (1.85 m)	190 lb (86 kg)	1990–03–09	Arellano
G	10	(Philippines)	Ryan Reyes	6 ft 2 in (1.88 m)	190 lb (86 kg)	1983–08–10	Cal State Fullerton
C	13	(Philippines)	Justin Chua	6 ft 6 in (1.98 m)	232 lb (105 kg)	1989–07–13	Ateneo
F	14	(Australia)	Anthony Semerad	6 ft 4 in (1.93 m)	220 lb (100 kg)	1991–04–25	San Beda
G	15	(Philippines)	Rudy Lingganay	5 ft 10 in (1.78 m)	170 lb (77 kg)	1986–08–15	UE
G/F	16	(Philippines)	Roger Pogoy (R)	6 ft 2 in (1.88 m)	180 lb (82 kg)	1992–06–16	Far Eastern
G	17	(Philippines)	Jayson Castro	5 ft 10 in (1.78 m)	185 lb (84 kg)	1986–06–30	Philippine Christian
F	18	(Philippines)	Troy Rosario	6 ft 7 in (2.01 m)	198 lb (90 kg)	1992–01–20	National-U
F/C	21	(United States)	Kelly Williams	6 ft 6 in (1.98 m)	215 lb (98 kg)	1982–02–07	Oakland
G	25	(Philippines)	Alfrancis Tamsi (R)	6 ft 1 in (1.85 m)	158 lb (72 kg)	1992–03–25	Far Eastern
F	42	(United States)	Danny Seigle	6 ft 6 in (1.98 m)	205 lb (93 kg)	1976–06–14	Wagner
F/C	–	(Canada)	Norbert Torres (IN)	6 ft 6 in (1.98 m)	250 lb (113 kg)	1990–01–12	De La Salle

Head coach

- (Philippines) Nash Racela

Assistant coach(es)

- (Philippines) Josh Reyes (1st Assistant)
- (Philippines) Bong Ravena
- (Philippines) Gilbert Lao
- (United States) Alton Lister

Team manager

- (Philippines) Virgil Villavicencio
- (Philippines) Magnum Membrere (Assistant)

Legend

- (C) Team captain
- (CI) Commissioner's Cup Import
- (GI) Governors' Cup Import
- (EI) EASL Import
- (DP) Unsigned draft pick
- (FA) Free agent
- (IN) Inactive
- (S) Suspended
- (R) Rookie
- Injured

Roster

== Philippine Cup ==
=== Eliminations ===
==== Standings ====
Pos	Team	W	L	PCT	GB	Qualification
1	San Miguel Beermen	10	1	.909	—	Twice-to-beat in the quarterfinals
2	Alaska Aces	7	4	.636 (Note: Head-to-head record: Alaska 1–0 Star)	3	Twice-to-beat in the quarterfinals
3	Star Hotshots	7	4	.636	3	Best-of-three quarterfinals
4	TNT KaTropa	6	5	.545 (Note: Head-to-head quotient: TNT 1.09, GlobalPort 1.00, Phoenix 0.96, Barangay Ginebra 0.94.)	4	Best-of-three quarterfinals
5	GlobalPort Batang Pier	6	5	.545	4	Best-of-three quarterfinals
6	Phoenix Fuel Masters	6	5	.545	4	Best-of-three quarterfinals
7	Barangay Ginebra San Miguel	6	5	.545	4	Twice-to-win in the quarterfinals
8	Rain or Shine Elasto Painters	5	6	.455 (Note: Eighth seed playoff: Rain or Shine 103–80 Blackwater)	5	Twice-to-win in the quarterfinals
9	Blackwater Elite	5	6	.455	5	
10	Mahindra Floodbuster	3	8	.273 (Note: Head-to-head record: Mahindra 1–0 Meralco)	7	
11	Meralco Bolts	3	8	.273	7	
12	NLEX Road Warriors	2	9	.182	8	

Source: PBA.ph

==== Game log ====
2017 PBA Philippine Cup game log
Total: 6–5
November: 1–1

Game	Date	Opponent	Score	High points	High rebounds	High assists	Location Attendance	Record
1	November 23	Rain or Shine	L 87–101	Ranidel de Ocampo (24)	Ranidel de Ocampo (10)	Ranidel de Ocampo (5)	Smart Araneta Coliseum	0–1
2	November 27	Barangay Ginebra	W 108–103	Ranidel de Ocampo (22)	de Ocampo, Rosario (7)	Matt Ganuelas-Rosser (5)	Smart Araneta Coliseum	1–1

December: 3–1

Game	Date	Opponent	Score	High points	High rebounds	High assists	Location Attendance	Record
3	December 2	Blackwater	W 99–92	Castro, Tautuaa (20)	Ranidel de Ocampo (8)	Jayson Castro (5)	Smart Araneta Coliseum	2–1
4	December 9	Meralco	L 87–98	Jayson Castro (23)	Kelly Williams (8)	Jayson Castro (7)	Smart Araneta Coliseum	2–2
5	December 16	Phoenix	W 117–98	Castro, Williams (18)	Kelly Williams (10)	Ryan Reyes (6)	Smart Araneta Coliseum	3–2
6	December 23	Alaska	W 109–100	Troy Rosario (26)	Carey, de Ocampo, Williams (8)	Jayson Castro (6)	PhilSports Arena	4–2

January: 2–3

Game	Date	Opponent	Score	High points	High rebounds	High assists	Location Attendance	Record
7	January 7	NLEX	L 98–110	Jayson Castro (17)	Carey, Williams (10)	Jayson Castro (7)	Angeles University Foundation Sports Arena	4–3
8	January 15	Star	L 77–88	Ranidel de Ocampo (21)	Roger Pogoy (11)	Jayson Castro (4)	Smart Araneta Coliseum	4–4
9	January 18	Mahindra	W 104–92	Troy Rosario (18)	Reyes, Rosario (9)	Castro, Pogoy, Reyes (4)	Cuneta Astrodome	5–4
10	January 25	GlobalPort	W 102–98	Roger Pogoy (20)	Rosario, Tautuaa (8)	Matt Ganuelas-Rosser (6)	Cuneta Astrodome	6–4
11	January 28	San Miguel	L 94–98	Moala Tautuaa (20)	Troy Rosario (9)	Jayson Castro (7)	Ynares Center	6–5

2016–17 schedule

=== Playoffs ===
==== Bracket ====
Quarterfinals
(#1 twice-to-beat)
1	San Miguel	98
8	Rain or Shine	91
(Best-of-3)
4	TNT	2
5	GlobalPort	0
(#2 twice-to-beat)
2	Alaska	81	97
7	Barangay Ginebra	85	108
(Best-of-3)
3	Star	2
6	Phoenix	0

Semifinals (Best-of-7)
1	San Miguel	4
4	TNT	3
7	Barangay Ginebra	4
3	Star	3

Finals (Best-of-7)
1	San Miguel	4
7	Barangay Ginebra	1

==== Game log ====
2017 PBA Philippine Cup playoffs game log
Total: 5–4
Quarterfinals: 2–0

Game	Date	Opponent	Score	High points	High rebounds	High assists	Location Attendance	Series
1	February 4	GlobalPort	W 109–101	Jayson Castro (20)	Moala Tautuaa (9)	Matt Ganuelas-Rosser (4)	Smart Araneta Coliseum	1–0
2	February 6	GlobalPort	W 95–90	Ranidel de Ocampo (25)	Troy Rosario (11)	Jayson Castro (8)	Smart Araneta Coliseum	2–0

Semifinals: 3–4

Game	Date	Opponent	Score	High points	High rebounds	High assists	Location Attendance	Series
1	February 8	San Miguel	L 98–111	Jayson Castro (27)	Moala Tautuaa (7)	Jayson Castro (8)	Smart Araneta Coliseum	0–1
2	February 10	San Miguel	W 87–85	Troy Rosario (14)	Ranidel de Ocampo (13)	Jayson Castro (11)	Mall of Asia Arena	1–1
3	February 12	San Miguel	W 98–92	Ranidel de Ocampo (24)	Ranidel de Ocampo (9)	Jayson Castro (12)	Smart Araneta Coliseum	2–1
4	February 14	San Miguel	L 86–97	Larry Fonacier (15)	Ganuelas-Rosser, Williams (7)	Castro, Reyes (5)	Mall of Asia Arena	2–2
5	February 16	San Miguel	W 101–94	Castro, de Ocampo, Williams (18)	Pogoy, Rosario, Williams (7)	Jayson Castro (7)	Smart Araneta Coliseum	3–2
6	February 18	San Miguel	L 88–104	Jayson Castro (19)	Ryan Reyes (9)	Jayson Castro (5)	Mall of Asia Arena	3–3
7	February 20	San Miguel	L 83–96	Larry Fonacier (14)	Kelly Williams (14)	Fonacier, Pogoy (4)	Mall of Asia Arena	3–4

2016–17 schedule

== Commissioner's Cup ==
=== Eliminations ===
==== Standings ====
Pos	Team	W	L	PCT	GB	Qualification
1	Barangay Ginebra San Miguel	9	2	.818 (Note: Head-to-head quotient: Barangay Ginebra 1.117, San Miguel 0.990, Star 0.903)	—	Twice-to-beat in the quarterfinals
2	San Miguel Beermen	9	2	.818	—	Twice-to-beat in the quarterfinals
3	Star Hotshots	9	2	.818	—	Best-of-three quarterfinals
4	TNT KaTropa	8	3	.727	1	Best-of-three quarterfinals
5	Meralco Bolts	7	4	.636	2	Best-of-three quarterfinals
6	Rain or Shine Elasto Painters	5	6	.455	4	Best-of-three quarterfinals
7	Phoenix Fuel Masters	4	7	.364 (Note: Head-to-head quotient: Phoenix 1.127, Alaska 1.116, GlobalPort 0.791; eighth seed playoff: GlobalPort 107–106 Alaska)	5	Twice-to-win in the quarterfinals
8	GlobalPort Batang Pier	4	7	.364	5	Twice-to-win in the quarterfinals
9	Alaska Aces	4	7	.364	5	
10	Mahindra Floodbuster	3	8	.273	6	
11	Blackwater Elite	2	9	.182 (Note: Head-to-head record: Blackwater 1–0 NLEX)	7	
12	NLEX Road Warriors	2	9	.182	7	

Source: PBA.ph

==== Game log ====
2017 PBA Commissioner's Cup game log
Total: 8–3
March: 2–1

Game	Date	Opponent	Score	High points	High rebounds	High assists	Location Attendance	Record
1	March 24	Meralco	L 89–94	Lou Amundson (19)	Lou Amundson (18)	Matt Ganuelas-Rosser (4)	Smart Araneta Coliseum	0–1
2	March 26	Phoenix	W 134–109	Lou Amundson (20)	Lou Amundson (8)	Jayson Castro (14)	Ynares Center	1–1
3	March 31	Blackwater	W 92–89	Roger Pogoy (24)	Donté Greene (13)	Castro, Pogoy, Reyes (3)	Smart Araneta Coliseum	2–1

April: 3–1

Game	Date	Opponent	Score	High points	High rebounds	High assists	Location Attendance	Record
4	April 7	NLEX	W 126–121 (OT)	Jayson Castro (32)	Donté Greene (16)	Jayson Castro (11)	Mall of Asia Arena	3–1
5	April 9	Mahindra	W 86–84	Donté Greene (24)	Donté Greene (14)	Jayson Castro (7)	Mall of Asia Arena	4–1
6	April 21	GlobalPort	W 109–88	Donté Greene (33)	Greene, Williams (10)	Ryan Reyes (6)	Smart Araneta Coliseum	5–1
7	April 23	Barangay Ginebra	L 89–107	Donté Greene (28)	Donté Greene (15)	Jayson Castro (5)	Smart Araneta Coliseum	5–2
All-Star Break

May: 2–1

Game	Date	Opponent	Score	High points	High rebounds	High assists	Location Attendance	Record
8	May 5	San Miguel	W 112–103	Donté Greene (41)	Donté Greene (21)	Greene, Rosales (4)	Smart Araneta Coliseum	6–2
9	May 10	Star	L 97–107	Donté Greene (29)	Donté Greene (12)	Kris Rosales (4)	Mall of Asia Arena	6–3
10	May 20	Alaska	W 119–110	Joshua Smith (23)	Joshua Smith (10)	Jayson Castro (7)	Ibalong Centrum for Recreation	7–3
11	May 28	Rain or Shine	W 105–102	Joshua Smith (23)	Joshua Smith (12)	Castro, Rosario (4)	Ynares Center	8–3

2016–17 schedule

=== Playoffs ===
==== Bracket ====
Quarterfinals
(#1 twice-to-beat)
1	Barangay Ginebra	96
8	GlobalPort	85
(Best-of-3)
4	TNT	2
5	Meralco	1
(#2 twice-to-beat)
2	San Miguel	115
7	Phoenix	96
(Best-of-3)
3	Star	2
6	Rain or Shine	0

Semifinals (Best-of-5)
1	Barangay Ginebra	1
4	TNT	3
2	San Miguel	3
3	Star	1

Finals (Best-of-7)
4	TNT	2
2	San Miguel	4

==== Game log ====
2017 PBA Commissioner's Cup playoffs game log
Total: 7–6
Quarterfinals: 2–1

Game	Date	Opponent	Score	High points	High rebounds	High assists	Location Attendance	Series
1	June 5	Meralco	W 102–84	Jayson Castro (25)	Tautuaa, Williams (8)	Jayson Castro (7)	Smart Araneta Coliseum	1–0
2	June 7	Meralco	L 100–103 (OT)	Joshua Smith (18)	Joshua Smith (18)	RR Garcia (5)	Smart Araneta Coliseum	1–1
3	June 9	Meralco	W 104–96 (OT)	Castro, Smith (31)	Joshua Smith (27)	Joshua Smith (4)	Smart Araneta Coliseum	2–1

Semifinals: 3–1

Game	Date	Opponent	Score	High points	High rebounds	High assists	Location Attendance	Series
1	June 11	Barangay Ginebra	W 100–94	Joshua Smith (35)	Joshua Smith (13)	Jayson Castro (6)	Mall of Asia Arena	1–0
2	June 13	Barangay Ginebra	W 107–103	Joshua Smith (16)	Joshua Smith (16)	Jayson Castro (8)	Mall of Asia Arena	2–0
3	June 15	Barangay Ginebra	L 101–125	RR Garcia (16)	Joshua Smith (7)	Castro, Garcia (3)	Smart Araneta Coliseum	2–1
4	June 15	Barangay Ginebra	W 122–109	Jayson Castro (38)	Kelly Williams (12)	Jayson Castro (11)	Cuneta Astrodome	3–1

Finals: 2–4

Game	Date	Opponent	Score	High points	High rebounds	High assists	Location Attendance	Series
1	June 21	San Miguel	W 104–102	Roger Pogoy (27)	Castro, Smith (9)	Jayson Castro (10)	Smart Araneta Coliseum	1–0
2	June 23	San Miguel	L 88–102	Jayson Castro (14)	Tautuaa, Williams (7)	Joshua Smith (5)	Smart Araneta Coliseum	1–1
3	June 25	San Miguel	L 97–109	RR Garcia (19)	Joshua Smith (14)	RR Garcia (4)	Smart Araneta Coliseum	1–2
4	June 28	San Miguel	W 102–97	Joshua Smith (20)	Joshua Smith (15)	Ryan Reyes (4)	Smart Araneta Coliseum	2–2
5	June 30	San Miguel	L 102–111	Ranidel de Ocampo (19)	Rosario, Smith (7)	Jayson Castro (12)	Smart Araneta Coliseum	2–3
6	July 2	San Miguel	L 91–115	Troy Rosario (21)	Kelly Williams (8)	five players (2)	Smart Araneta Coliseum	2–4

2016–17 schedule

== Governors' Cup ==
=== Eliminations ===
==== Standings ====
Pos	Team	W	L	PCT	GB	Qualification
1	Meralco Bolts	9	2	.818	—	Twice-to-beat in the quarterfinals
2	TNT KaTropa	8	3	.727 (Note: Head-to-head record: Talk 'N Text 1–0 Barangay Ginebra)	1	Twice-to-beat in the quarterfinals
3	Barangay Ginebra San Miguel	8	3	.727	1	Twice-to-beat in the quarterfinals
4	Star Hotshots	7	4	.636 (Note: Head to-head quotient: Star 1.04, NLEX 1.01, San Miguel 0.99, Rain or Shine 0.96)	2	Twice-to-beat in the quarterfinals
5	NLEX Road Warriors	7	4	.636	2	Twice-to-win in the quarterfinals
6	San Miguel Beermen	7	4	.636	2	Twice-to-win in the quarterfinals
7	Rain or Shine Elasto Painters	7	4	.636	2	Twice-to-win in the quarterfinals
8	Blackwater Elite	5	6	.455	4	Twice-to-win in the quarterfinals
9	Alaska Aces	3	8	.273 (Note: Head-to-head record: Alaska 1–0 GlobalPort)	6	
10	GlobalPort Batang Pier	3	8	.273	6	
11	Phoenix Fuel Masters	2	9	.182	7	
12	Kia Picanto	0	11	.000	9	

Source: PBA.ph

==== Game log ====
2017 PBA Governors' Cup game log
Total: 8–3
July: 1–0

Game	Date	Opponent	Score	High points	High rebounds	High assists	Location Attendance	Record
1	July 28	Kia	W 106–96	Michael Craig (21)	Michael Craig (13)	Michael Craig (12)	Ynares Center	1–0

August: 3–2

Game	Date	Opponent	Score	High points	High rebounds	High assists	Location Attendance	Record
2	August 2	San Miguel	L 91–97	Michael Craig (16)	Michael Craig (18)	Ranidel de Ocampo (5)	Smart Araneta Coliseum	1–1
3	August 4	Alaska	W 107–106	Michael Craig (28)	Michael Craig (19)	Jayson Castro (10)	Smart Araneta Coliseum	2–1
4	August 20	Rain or Shine	L 73–105	Glen Rice Jr. (19)	Ranidel de Ocampo (11)	Ryan Reyes (4)	Smart Araneta Coliseum	2–2
5	August 25	Phoenix	W 110–103	Glen Rice Jr. (38)	Glen Rice Jr. (9)	Glen Rice Jr. (5)	Smart Araneta Coliseum	3–2
6	August 30	Blackwater	W 117–96	Glen Rice Jr. (31)	Troy Rosario (9)	Castro, Rice Jr. (4)	Mall of Asia Arena	4–2

September: 4–1

Game	Date	Opponent	Score	High points	High rebounds	High assists	Location Attendance	Record
7	September 1	GlobalPort	L 112–119	Glen Rice Jr. (39)	Glen Rice Jr. (13)	Glen Rice Jr. (5)	Ynares Center	4–3
8	September 6	Meralco	W 113–107	Glen Rice Jr. (32)	Kelly Williams (13)	Ryan Reyes (4)	Smart Araneta Coliseum	5–3
9	September 13	NLEX	W 112–107	Glen Rice Jr. (25)	Glen Rice Jr. (15)	Glen Rice Jr. (10)	Ynares Center	6–3
10	September 17	Star	W 104–99	Glen Rice Jr. (43)	Glen Rice Jr. (19)	Glen Rice Jr. (9)	Ynares Center	7–3
11	September 23	Barangay Ginebra	W 121–92	Glen Rice Jr. (36)	Kelly Williams (11)	Jayson Castro (7)	Smart Araneta Coliseum	8–3

2016–17 schedule

=== Playoffs ===
==== Bracket ====
Quarterfinals (Top 4 twice-to-beat)
1	Meralco	91	104
8	Blackwater	92	96
4	Star	89
5	NLEX	77
2	TNT	102	118
7	Rain or Shine	106	114
3	Barangay Ginebra	104
6	San Miguel	84

Semifinals (Best-of-5)
1	Meralco	3
4	Star	0
2	TNT	1
3	Barangay Ginebra	3

Finals (Best-of-7)
1	Meralco	3
3	Barangay Ginebra	4

==== Game log ====
2017 PBA Governors' Cup playoffs game log
Total: 2–4
Quarterfinals: 1–1

Game	Date	Opponent	Score	High points	High rebounds	High assists	Location Attendance	Record
1	September 27	Rain or Shine	L 102–106	Kelly Williams (23)	Troy Rosario (16)	Castro, Rice Jr. (6)	Mall of Asia Arena	0–1
2	September 29	Rain or Shine	W 118–114	Glen Rice Jr. (34)	Glen Rice Jr. (16)	Jayson Castro (12)	Smart Araneta Coliseum	1–1

Semifinals: 1–3

Game	Date	Opponent	Score	High points	High rebounds	High assists	Location Attendance	Record
1	October 2	Barangay Ginebra	L 94–121	Glen Rice Jr. (26)	Glen Rice Jr. (10)	Jayson Castro (7)	Smart Araneta Coliseum	0–1
2	October 4	Barangay Ginebra	W 103–96	Glen Rice Jr. (21)	Kelly Williams (11)	Jayson Castro (10)	Batangas City Coliseum	1–1
3	October 6	Barangay Ginebra	L 103–106	Glen Rice Jr. (44)	Glen Rice Jr. (20)	Jayson Castro (9)	Smart Araneta Coliseum	1–2
4	October 8	Barangay Ginebra	L 105–115	Troy Rosario (28)	Troy Rosario (10)	Jayson Castro (9)	Smart Araneta Coliseum	1–3

2016–17 schedule

== Transactions ==
=== Trades ===
==== Pre-season ====
November
November 15, 2016	To TNT Frank Golla	To Blackwater Dylan Ababou

==== Commissioner's Cup ====
April
April 24, 2017	To TNT RR Garcia	To San Miguel Matt Ganuelas-Rosser

=== Recruited imports ===
Conference	Name	Country	Number	Debuted	Last game	Record
Commissioner's Cup	Lou Amundson	(United States)	8	March 24 (vs. Meralco)	March 26 (vs. Phoenix)	1–1
Commissioner's Cup	Donté Greene	(United States)	20	March 31 (vs. Blackwater)	May 10 (vs. Star)	5–2
Commissioner's Cup	Joshua Smith	(United States)	32	May 20 (vs. Alaska)	July 2 (vs. San Miguel)	9–6
Governors' Cup	Michael Craig	(United States)	32	July 28 (vs. Kia)	August 4 (vs. Alaska)	2–1
Governors' Cup	Glen Rice Jr.	(United States)	41	August 20 (vs. Rain or Shine)	October 8 (vs. Barangay Ginebra)	8–6

== Awards ==
Recipient	Award	Date awarded	Ref.
Troy Rosario	All-Star Game Most Valuable Player (Mindanao leg)	April 26, 2017	
Roger Pogoy	Commissioner's Cup Player of the Week	June 13, 2017	
Jayson Castro	Commissioner's Cup Player of the Week	June 19, 2017	
Roger Pogoy	Rookie of the Year Award	October 20, 2017	
Honors
Jayson Castro	Second Mythical Team	October 20, 2017	
Kelly Williams	Second Mythical Team	October 20, 2017	
