= Matt Ganuelas-Rosser =

Filipino-American basketball player

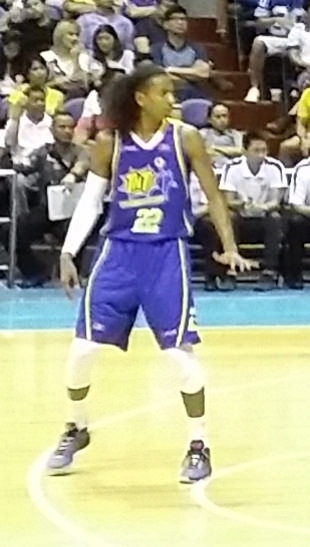
- Ganuelas-Rosser with TNT in 2015

Personal information
- Born: June 13, 1990 (age 36) Olongapo City, Philippines
- Listed height: 6 ft 4 in (1.93 m)
- Listed weight: 186 lb (84 kg)

Career information
- High school: Temecula Valley (Temecula, California)
- College: Cal Poly Pomona (2008–2012)
- PBA draft: 2014: 1st round, 4th overall pick
- Drafted by: NLEX Road Warriors
- Playing career: 2014–2024
- Position: Small forward / shooting guard

Career history
- 2014–2017: Talk 'N Text Tropang Texters / TNT Tropang Texters / Tropang TNT / TNT KaTropa
- 2017–2020: San Miguel Beermen
- 2021: Terrafirma Dyip
- 2022–2024: TNT Tropang Giga

Career highlights
- 6× PBA champion (2015 Commissioner's, 2017 Commissioner's, 2017–18 Philippine, 2019 Philippine, 2019 Commissioner's, 2023 Governors'); PBA All-Rookie Team (2015); PBA All-Star Rookies vs Sophomores Game MVP (2015); NCAA Division II champion (2010)

Matthew Allen Ganuelas-Rosser (born June 13, 1990) is a Filipino former professional basketball player. He played for three franchises during his career in the Philippine Basketball Association (PBA). He played college basketball for the NCAA Division II school Cal Poly Pomona. He was recruited to play for the Philippine national basketball team during their 2012 William Jones Cup campaign. He was drafted 4th overall by NLEX in the 2014 PBA draft.

== Early life ==
Ganuelas-Rosser was born in Olongapo City, where his father James Rosser and mother Gina Ganuelas met. James is a retired U.S. Navy who was stationed in Subic Bay for many years. But the Mount Pinatubo eruption in 1991 forced the Rossers to move to San Diego when Matt was just two years old. When he was six, he started to love the sport of basketball. When he went to middle school, his potential slowly began to show. He played four years of high school basketball in Temecula Valley High School where he was the tallest player on the team. Scouts from various Division I colleges started to notice him. But a knee injury sidelined him in his senior year where he missed 15 games. Despite the injury, he averaged 18 points and 10 rebounds per game.

== College career ==
Rosser played for California State Polytechnic University, Pomona Broncos from 2008 to 2012. During his four years at Cal Poly Pomona, he finished seventh all-time in games played and helped the Broncos capture the 2010 NCAA Men's Division II Basketball Championship.

=== College statistics ===
Year	Team	GP	MPG	FG%	3P%	FT%	RPG	APG	SPG	BPG	PPG
2011–12	California State Polytechnic University	27	30.4	.508	.412	.726	2.7	2.85	1.11	.63	7.80
2010–11	California State Polytechnic University	28	29.5	.351	.194	.765	2.4	2.50	.75	.35	5.70
2009–10	California State Polytechnic University	34	20.6	.458	.259	.627	1.8	1.05	.41	.23	4.80
2008–09	California State Polytechnic University	25	9.80	.410	0.0	.680	0.9	.36	.24	.32	2.0

== Professional career ==
On August 24, 2014, Ganuelas-Rosser was picked by the NLEX Road Warriors in the 2014 PBA draft as their 4th overall pick. On September 22, 2014, Rosser was sent from NLEX to Talk 'N Text which is a part of a series of trades between Talk 'N Text, GlobalPort, and the NLEX Road Warriors. That season, he was in the Rookies vs. Sophomores exhibition game and won MVP, scoring 24 of his 32 points in a 150–131 win. He also scored his PBA elimination round high of 22 points in a win against the San Miguel Beermen.

On April 24, 2017, Ganuelas-Rosser was traded by the TNT KaTropa to the San Miguel Beermen in exchange for RR Garcia.

On January 24, 2018, Ganuelas-Rosser grabbed a career-high 12 rebounds to go along with 10 points and 4 steals in a 107–93 win over the NorthPort Batang Pier.

In 2021, Ganuelas-Rosser considered retiring due to the COVID-19 pandemic, but decided to finish his contract with San Miguel. On February 2, 2021, he was traded to the Terrafirma Dyip along with Russel Escoto, Gelo Alolino, and two future first-round picks, for CJ Perez. On January 1, 2022, he became an unrestricted free agent and subsequently declined a new contract with the team.

On January 21, 2022, Ganuelas-Rosser signed with TNT Tropang Giga to return to the franchise that drafted him back in 2014. He won another championship with them during the 2023 Governors' Cup. He became an unrestricted free agent in June 2024 after refusing a contract extension offer by TNT.

== PBA career statistics ==
Legend
GP	Games played	MPG	Minutes per game
FG%	Field-goal percentage	3P%	3-point field-goal percentage	FT%	Free-throw percentage
RPG	Rebounds per game	APG	Assists per game	SPG	Steals per game
BPG	Blocks per game	PPG	Points per game	**Bold**	Career high

As of the end of 2023–24 season

=== Season-by-season averages ===
Year	Team	GP	MPG	FG%	3P%	FT%	RPG	APG	SPG	BPG	PPG
2014–15	Talk 'N Text	50	**24.0**	.507	**.300**	.634	**4.1**	1.5	.5	**1.1**	**8.5**
2015–16	TNT	38	18.6	.405	.143	.434	2.2	1.7	.4	.5	4.2
2016–17	TNT	35	15.7	.533	.000	.541	2.9	1.7	.5	.5	4.3
2016–17	San Miguel	35	15.7	.533	.000	.541	2.9	1.7	.5	.5	4.3
2017–18	San Miguel	47	14.7	**.605**	.000	.368	2.7	1.1	.6	.4	3.4
2019	San Miguel	45	10.7	.483	—	.294	1.4	1.1	.4	.3	1.4
2021	Terrafirma	21	19.7	.556	.000	.474	2.8	**2.2**	**1.1**	.5	4.2
2021	TNT	21	19.7	.556	.000	.474	2.8	**2.2**	**1.1**	.5	4.2
2022–23	TNT	**51**	10.4	.561	.000	.440	1.7	1.2	.4	.5	1.5
2023–24	TNT	16	7.1	.500	.000	**1.000**	1.1	.9	.1	.3	1.4
Career		303	15.5	.510	.167	.532	2.5	1.4	.5	.5	3.8

== International career ==
Ganuelas-Rosser is part of the Smart Gilas team that brought home the gold during the 2012 William Jones Cup. During the 2012 William Jones Cup, he played in 3 out of the 8 games, averaging 9.6 MPG, 2.67 PPG and 1.67 RPG. He was also part of the Sinag Pilipinas team that won the gold medal in the 2013 SEA Games in Myanmar. After his rookie season in the PBA, he was named to the 16-man Gilas Pilipinas 3.0 pool and saw action in both the Estonia pocket tournament and in the 2015 William Jones Cup. After a successful stint in the Jones Cup, he was named to the 12-man Gilas Pilipinas roster that competed in the 2015 FIBA Asia Championship in Changsha and won the silver medal. In FIBA-sanctioned tournaments, he uses Ganuelas for his last name.

== Personal life ==
Ganuelas-Rosser has two younger brothers, Brandon and Jason, and has a degree of business management. He enjoys watching movies, listening to music and eating in his free time. Brandon is currently playing for the TNT Tropang 5G. He was drafted #1 overall by Blackwater Bossing in the 2022 PBA draft.
