= 2016–17 GlobalPort Batang Pier season =

- Head coach: Franz Pumaren
- Owners: Sultan 900 Capital, Inc.

Philippine Cup results
- Record: 6–5 (54.5%)
- Place: 5th
- Playoff finish: Quarterfinalist (lost to TNT, 0–2)

Commissioner's Cup results
- Record: 4–7 (36.4%)
- Place: 8th
- Playoff finish: Quarterfinalist (lost to Barangay Ginebra with twice-to-win disadvantage)

Governors' Cup results
- Record: 3–8 (27.3%)
- Place: 10th
- Playoff finish: Did not qualify

GlobalPort Batang Pier seasons

The 2016–17 GlobalPort Batang Pier season was the 5th season of the franchise in the Philippine Basketball Association (PBA).

== Key dates ==
=== 2016 ===
- October 30: The 2016 PBA draft took place at Midtown Atrium, Robinson Place Manila.
- November 25: GlobalPort Batang Pier formally appointed team consultant Franz Pumaren to be its head coach replacing Johnedel Cardel, who was then relegated as an assistant coach.

== Draft picks ==
=== Special draft ===
Player	Position	Nationality	PBA D-League team	College
Von Pessumal	G	Philippines	Tanduay Light Rhum Masters	Ateneo

=== Regular draft ===
Round	Pick	Player	Position	Nationality	PBA D-League team	College
3	12	Al Francis Tamsi	G	Philippines	Phoenix Accelerators	FEU
3	15	Ryan Arambulo	G/F	United States	AMA Online Education Titans	Cal State Fullerton
4	20	Spencer John Eman	C	Philippines	Derulo Accelero Oilers	NU

== Roster ==
2016–17 GlobalPort Batang Pier roster
Players
Coaches

Pos.	#	POB	Name	Height	Weight	DOB (YYYY–MM–DD)	From
G	0	(Philippines)	Paulo Hubalde	5 ft 11 in (1.80 m)	170 lb (77 kg)	1981–01–24	UE
F	1	(Philippines)	Rico Maierhofer	6 ft 6 in (1.98 m)	175 lb (79 kg)	1985–11–04	De La Salle
F/C	2	(Philippines)	Billy Mamaril (C)	6 ft 6 in (1.98 m)	225 lb (102 kg)	1980–06–25	Bakersfield
G	3	(United States)	Stanley Pringle	6 ft 1 in (1.85 m)	190 lb (86 kg)	1987–03–05	Penn State
G	7	(Philippines)	Terrence Romeo	5 ft 11 in (1.80 m)	178 lb (81 kg)	1992–03–16	Far Eastern
F	8	(Philippines)	Robby Celiz	6 ft 3 in (1.91 m)	217 lb (98 kg)	1988–09–07	National-U
G/F	9	(Canada)	James Forrester	6 ft 2 in (1.88 m)	190 lb (86 kg)	1989–09–03	Arellano
F	10	(Canada)	Sean Anthony	6 ft 4 in (1.93 m)	200 lb (91 kg)	1986–01–26	McGill
G	11	(United States)	Mike Cortez	6 ft 0 in (1.83 m)	170 lb (77 kg)	1980–10–11	De La Salle
F	12	(Philippines)	Mac Baracael	6 ft 4 in (1.93 m)	205 lb (93 kg)	1985–04–14	Far Eastern
G/F	14	(Philippines)	Jonathan Grey (R)	6 ft 3 in (1.91 m)	190 lb (86 kg)	1992–01–13	St. Benilde
G	17	(Philippines)	Mark Cardona	6 ft 0 in (1.83 m)	180 lb (82 kg)	1981–11–13	De La Salle
G	18	(Philippines)	Ryan Araña	6 ft 2 in (1.88 m)	180 lb (82 kg)	1984–03–23	De La Salle
F/C	28	(Philippines)	Philip Paredes	6 ft 5 in (1.96 m)	200 lb (91 kg)	1992–01–12	De La Salle
F/C	30	(Philippines)	Bradwyn Guinto	6 ft 6 in (1.98 m)	220 lb (100 kg)	1991–10–20	San Sebastian
C	77	(Germany)	Arnold Van Opstal (R)	6 ft 9 in (2.06 m)	220 lb (100 kg)	1991–12–15	De La Salle

Head coach

- (Philippines) Franz Pumaren

Assistant coach(es)

- (Philippines) Eric Gonzales (1st Assistant)
- (Philippines) Pocholo Villanueva
- (Philippines) Johnedel Cardel
- (Philippines) Oliver Bunyi

Team manager

- (Philippines) Bonnie Tan
- (Philippines) Benjo Flores (Assistant)

Legend

- (C) Team captain
- (CI) Commissioner's Cup Import
- (GI) Governors' Cup Import
- (EI) EASL Import
- (DP) Unsigned draft pick
- (FA) Free agent
- (IN) Inactive
- (S) Suspended
- (R) Rookie
- Injured

Roster

== Philippine Cup ==
=== Eliminations ===
==== Standings ====
Pos	Team	W	L	PCT	GB	Qualification
1	San Miguel Beermen	10	1	.909	—	Twice-to-beat in the quarterfinals
2	Alaska Aces	7	4	.636 (Note: Head-to-head record: Alaska 1–0 Star)	3	Twice-to-beat in the quarterfinals
3	Star Hotshots	7	4	.636	3	Best-of-three quarterfinals
4	TNT KaTropa	6	5	.545 (Note: Head-to-head quotient: TNT 1.09, GlobalPort 1.00, Phoenix 0.96, Barangay Ginebra 0.94.)	4	Best-of-three quarterfinals
5	GlobalPort Batang Pier	6	5	.545	4	Best-of-three quarterfinals
6	Phoenix Fuel Masters	6	5	.545	4	Best-of-three quarterfinals
7	Barangay Ginebra San Miguel	6	5	.545	4	Twice-to-win in the quarterfinals
8	Rain or Shine Elasto Painters	5	6	.455 (Note: Eighth seed playoff: Rain or Shine 103–80 Blackwater)	5	Twice-to-win in the quarterfinals
9	Blackwater Elite	5	6	.455	5	
10	Mahindra Floodbuster	3	8	.273 (Note: Head-to-head record: Mahindra 1–0 Meralco)	7	
11	Meralco Bolts	3	8	.273	7	
12	NLEX Road Warriors	2	9	.182	8	

Source: PBA.ph

==== Game log ====
2017 PBA Philippine Cup game log
Total: 6–5
November: 1–0

Game	Date	Opponent	Score	High points	High rebounds	High assists	Location Attendance	Record
1	November 25	Mahindra	W 97–75	Terrence Romeo (29)	KG Canaleta (11)	Terrence Romeo (6)	Smart Araneta Coliseum	1–0

December : 2–3

Game	Date	Opponent	Score	High points	High rebounds	High assists	Location Attendance	Record
2	December 2	Star	W 91–84	Stanley Pringle (24)	J. R. Quiñahan (10)	Terrence Romeo (8)	Smart Araneta Coliseum	2–0
3	December 7	Alaska	L 84–95	Terrence Romeo (26)	KG Canaleta (10)	Pringle, Romeo (4)	Mall of Asia Arena	2–1
4	December 11	Barangay Ginebra	W 91–84	Terrence Romeo (35)	J. R. Quiñahan (9)	Stanley Pringle (4)	Smart Araneta Coliseum	3–1
5	December 21	Blackwater	L 91–99	Terrence Romeo (22)	Canaleta, Quiñahan, Romeo (8)	Terrence Romeo (9)	Filoil Flying V Centre	3–2
6	December 28	Phoenix	L 99–101	Terrence Romeo (32)	J. R. Quiñahan (14)	Terrence Romeo (9)	Cuneta Astrodome	3–3

January : 3–2

Game	Date	Opponent	Score	High points	High rebounds	High assists	Location Attendance	Record
7	January 6	Meralco	W 97–89	Terrence Romeo (27)	Stanley Pringle (9)	Terrence Romeo (5)	Mall of Asia Arena	4–3
8	January 13	NLEX	W 110–96	Terrence Romeo (32)	Mamaril, Quiñahan (7)	Stanley Pringle (7)	Mall of Asia Arena	5–3
9	January 21	San Miguel	L 100–106	Stanley Pringle (21)	J. R. Quiñahan (11)	Terrence Romeo (9)	Hoops Dome	5–4
10	January 25	TNT	L 98–102	Terrence Romeo (35)	Pringle, Romeo (9)	Terrence Romeo (6)	Cuneta Astrodome	5–5
11	January 29	Rain or Shine	W 117–99	Terrence Romeo (44)	Yutien Andrada (8)	Terrence Romeo (6)	Cuneta Astrodome	6–5

2016–17 schedule

=== Playoffs ===
==== Bracket ====
Quarterfinals
(#1 twice-to-beat)
1	San Miguel	98
8	Rain or Shine	91
(Best-of-3)
4	TNT	2
5	GlobalPort	0
(#2 twice-to-beat)
2	Alaska	81	97
7	Barangay Ginebra	85	108
(Best-of-3)
3	Star	2
6	Phoenix	0

Semifinals (Best-of-7)
1	San Miguel	4
4	TNT	3
7	Barangay Ginebra	4
3	Star	3

Finals (Best-of-7)
1	San Miguel	4
7	Barangay Ginebra	1

==== Game log ====
2017 PBA Philippine Cup playoffs game log
Total: 0–2
Quarterfinals: 0–2

Game	Date	Opponent	Score	High points	High rebounds	High assists	Location Attendance	Series
1	February 4	TNT	L 101–109	Terrence Romeo (28)	J. R. Quiñahan (6)	Terrence Romeo (8)	Smart Araneta Coliseum	0–1
2	February 6	TNT	L 90–95	Terrence Romeo (22)	Rico Maierhofer (10)	Stanley Pringle (6)	Smart Araneta Coliseum	0–2

2016–17 schedule

== Commissioner's Cup ==
=== Eliminations ===
==== Standings ====
Pos	Team	W	L	PCT	GB	Qualification
1	Barangay Ginebra San Miguel	9	2	.818 (Note: Head-to-head quotient: Barangay Ginebra 1.117, San Miguel 0.990, Star 0.903)	—	Twice-to-beat in the quarterfinals
2	San Miguel Beermen	9	2	.818	—	Twice-to-beat in the quarterfinals
3	Star Hotshots	9	2	.818	—	Best-of-three quarterfinals
4	TNT KaTropa	8	3	.727	1	Best-of-three quarterfinals
5	Meralco Bolts	7	4	.636	2	Best-of-three quarterfinals
6	Rain or Shine Elasto Painters	5	6	.455	4	Best-of-three quarterfinals
7	Phoenix Fuel Masters	4	7	.364 (Note: Head-to-head quotient: Phoenix 1.127, Alaska 1.116, GlobalPort 0.791; eighth seed playoff: GlobalPort 107–106 Alaska)	5	Twice-to-win in the quarterfinals
8	GlobalPort Batang Pier	4	7	.364	5	Twice-to-win in the quarterfinals
9	Alaska Aces	4	7	.364	5	
10	Mahindra Floodbuster	3	8	.273	6	
11	Blackwater Elite	2	9	.182 (Note: Head-to-head record: Blackwater 1–0 NLEX)	7	
12	NLEX Road Warriors	2	9	.182	7	

Source: PBA.ph

==== Game log ====
2017 PBA Commissioner's Cup game log
Total: 4–7
March: 0–2

Game	Date	Opponent	Score	High points	High rebounds	High assists	Location Attendance	Record
1	March 18	Alaska	L 79–107	Stanley Pringle (27)	Sean Williams (19)	Stanley Pringle (6)	Cuneta Astrodome	0–1
2	March 25	Star	L 77–103	Sean Williams (20)	Sean Williams (14)	Terrence Romeo (8)	Mindanao Civic Center Gymnasium	0–2

April : 2–3

Game	Date	Opponent	Score	High points	High rebounds	High assists	Location Attendance	Record
3	April 5	Barangay Ginebra	L 96–113	Stanley Pringle (29)	Sean Williams (12)	Terrence Romeo (7)	Smart Araneta Coliseum	0–3
4	April 8	Blackwater	L 113–118	Terrence Romeo (35)	Malcolm White (17)	Stanley Pringle (5)	Oracle Arena	0–4
5	April 12	NLEX	W 85–82	Malcolm White (23)	Malcolm White (16)	Terrence Romeo (5)	Quicken Loans Arena	1–4
6	April 21	TNT	L 88–109	Malcolm White (21)	Malcolm White (16)	Cortez, Romeo (4)	Amway Center	1–5
7	April 23	Mahindra	W 105–86	Stanley Pringle (24)	Malcolm White (17)	Stanley Pringle (5)	Smart Araneta Coliseum	2–5
All-Star Break

May : 2–1

Game	Date	Opponent	Score	High points	High rebounds	High assists	Location Attendance	Record
8	May 5	Phoenix	L 72–84	Stanley Pringle (25)	Stanley Pringle (9)	Stanley Pringle (6)	Smart Araneta Coliseum	2–6
9	May 10	Meralco	W 94–86	Justin Harper (30)	Justin Harper (19)	Stanley Pringle (8)	Mall of Asia Arena	3–6
10	May 26	Rain or Shine	W 107–101	Terrence Romeo (26)	Justin Harper (10)	Terrence Romeo (7)	Alonte Sports Arena	4–6

June : 0–1

Game	Date	Opponent	Score	High points	High rebounds	High assists	Location Attendance	Record
11	June 2	San Miguel	L 101–112	Justin Harper (25)	Justin Harper (12)	Terrence Romeo (7)	Smart Araneta Coliseum	4–7

2016–17 schedule

=== Playoffs ===
==== Bracket ====
Quarterfinals
(#1 twice-to-beat)
1	Barangay Ginebra	96
8	GlobalPort	85
(Best-of-3)
4	TNT	2
5	Meralco	1
(#2 twice-to-beat)
2	San Miguel	115
7	Phoenix	96
(Best-of-3)
3	Star	2
6	Rain or Shine	0

Semifinals (Best-of-5)
1	Barangay Ginebra	1
4	TNT	3
2	San Miguel	3
3	Star	1

Finals (Best-of-7)
4	TNT	2
2	San Miguel	4

==== Game log ====
2017 PBA Commissioner's Cup playoffs game log
Total: 1–1
8th seed playoff: 1–0

Game	Date	Opponent	Score	High points	High rebounds	High assists	Location Attendance	Series
1	June 4	Alaska	W 107–106	Justin Harper (32)	Justin Harper (17)	Stanley Pringle (5)	Mall of Asia Arena	1–0

Quarterfinals: 0–1

Game	Date	Opponent	Score	High points	High rebounds	High assists	Location Attendance	Series
1	June 6	Barangay Ginebra	L 85–96	Justin Harper (29)	Justin Harper (15)	Stanley Pringle (3)	Smart Araneta Coliseum	0–1

2016–17 schedule

== Governors' Cup ==
=== Eliminations ===
==== Standings ====
Pos	Team	W	L	PCT	GB	Qualification
1	Meralco Bolts	9	2	.818	—	Twice-to-beat in the quarterfinals
2	TNT KaTropa	8	3	.727 (Note: Head-to-head record: Talk 'N Text 1–0 Barangay Ginebra)	1	Twice-to-beat in the quarterfinals
3	Barangay Ginebra San Miguel	8	3	.727	1	Twice-to-beat in the quarterfinals
4	Star Hotshots	7	4	.636 (Note: Head to-head quotient: Star 1.04, NLEX 1.01, San Miguel 0.99, Rain or Shine 0.96)	2	Twice-to-beat in the quarterfinals
5	NLEX Road Warriors	7	4	.636	2	Twice-to-win in the quarterfinals
6	San Miguel Beermen	7	4	.636	2	Twice-to-win in the quarterfinals
7	Rain or Shine Elasto Painters	7	4	.636	2	Twice-to-win in the quarterfinals
8	Blackwater Elite	5	6	.455	4	Twice-to-win in the quarterfinals
9	Alaska Aces	3	8	.273 (Note: Head-to-head record: Alaska 1–0 GlobalPort)	6	
10	GlobalPort Batang Pier	3	8	.273	6	
11	Phoenix Fuel Masters	2	9	.182	7	
12	Kia Picanto	0	11	.000	9	

Source: PBA.ph

==== Game log ====
2017 PBA Governors' Cup game log
Total: 3–8
July: 1–2

Game	Date	Opponent	Score	High points	High rebounds	High assists	Location Attendance	Record
1	July 21	Rain or Shine	L 96–98	Terrence Romeo (28)	Sean Anthony (16)	Stanley Pringle (7)	Smart Araneta Coliseum	0–1
2	July 26	Phoenix	W 100–91	Murphey Holloway (29)	Murphey Holloway (26)	Terrence Romeo (5)	Smart Araneta Coliseum	1–1
3	July 30	Barangay Ginebra	L 108–124	Murphey Holloway (36)	Murphey Holloway (18)	Terrence Romeo (9)	Smart Araneta Coliseum	1–2

August: 1–1

Game	Date	Opponent	Score	High points	High rebounds	High assists	Location Attendance	Record
4	August 20	Kia	W 102–90	Murphey Holloway (29)	Murphey Holloway (18)	Mike Cortez (6)	Smart Araneta Coliseum	2–2
5	August 25	San Miguel	L 112–115	Terrence Romeo (26)	Murphey Holloway (23)	Murphey Holloway (6)	Smart Araneta Coliseum	2–3

September: 1–5

Game	Date	Opponent	Score	High points	High rebounds	High assists	Location Attendance	Record
6	September 1	TNT	W 119–112	Stanley Pringle (30)	Murphey Holloway (17)	Murphey Holloway (6)	Ynares Center	3–3
7	September 3	NLEX	L 99–109	Murphey Holloway (29)	Murphey Holloway (17)	Murphey Holloway (6)	Smart Araneta Coliseum	3–4
8	September 8	Alaska	L 88–101	Murphey Holloway (25)	Anthony, Holloway (9)	Baracael, Romeo (4)	Mall of Asia Arena	3–5
9	September 15	Star	L 83–109	Murphey Holloway (20)	Murphey Holloway (17)	Terrence Romeo (8)	Smart Araneta Coliseum	3–6
10	September 17	Blackwater	L 107–118	Murphey Holloway (28)	Murphey Holloway (23)	Sean Anthony (6)	Ynares Center	3–7
11	September 22	Meralco	L 93–100	Sean Anthony (23)	Sean Anthony (13)	Grey, Pringle (3)	Mall of Asia Arena	3–8

2016–17 schedule

== Transactions ==
=== Trades ===
==== Pre-season ====
October
October 13, 2016	To GlobalPort JR Quiñahan	To Rain or Shine Jay Washington
October 28, 2016	To GlobalPort Rey Guevarra	To Meralco Joseph Yeo
November
November 11, 2016	To GlobalPort Mick Pennisi	To Phoenix Doug Kramer

==== Commissioner's Cup ====
March 2017
March 29	To Globalport: Dylan Ababou; James Forrester	To Blackwater: Niño Canaleta
May 2017
May 6	Four-team trade
May 6	To GlobalPort: Sean Anthony (from NLEX); Bradwyn Guinto (from NLEX); Jonathan Grey (from Meralco)	To NLEX: Larry Fonacier (from TNT); J.R. Quiñahan (from GlobalPort); 2017 2nd Round pick (from Meralco, originally from Mahindra); 2019 2nd Round pick (from GlobalPort)
May 6	To TNT: Anthony Semerad (from GlobalPort); 2017 1st Round Pick (from GlobalPort, originally from TNT)	To Meralco: Garvo Lanete (from NLEX)

=== Rookie signings ===
Player	Number	Position	Date signed	School/club team
Von Pessumal	19	Guard		Ateneo
Jessie Saitanan	14	Forward-Center		Mapua

=== Free agency ===
==== Additions ====
Player	Signed	Former team
KG Canaleta		Mahindra Enforcer

=== Recruited imports ===
Conference	Name	Country	Number	Debuted	Last game	Record
Commissioner's Cup	Sean Williams	(United States)	51	March 18 (vs. Alaska)	April 5 (vs. Star)	0–3
Commissioner's Cup	Malcolm White	(United States)	5	April 8 (vs. Blackwater)	May 5 (vs. Phoenix)	2–3
Commissioner's Cup	Justin Harper	(United States)	32	May 10 (vs. Meralco)	June 6 (vs. Barangay Ginebra)	3–2
Governors' Cup	Jabril Trawick	(United States)	25	July 21 (vs. Rain or Shine)	July 21 (vs. Rain or Shine)	0–1
Governors' Cup	Murphey Holloway	(United States)	31	July 26 (vs. Phoenix)	September 17 (vs. Blackwater)	3–6

== Awards ==
Recipient	Award	Date awarded	Ref.
Terrence Romeo	All-Star Game Most Valuable Player (Visayas leg)	April 30, 2017	
