= 2016–17 Kia Picanto season =

2016–17 Kia Picanto (PBA team) season
- Head coach: Manny Pacquiao
- Owner: Columbian Autocar Corporation

Philippine Cup results
- Record: 3–8 (27.3%)
- Place: 10th
- Playoff finish: Did not qualify

Commissioner's Cup results
- Record: 3–8 (27.3%)
- Place: 10th
- Playoff finish: Did not qualify

Governors' Cup results
- Record: 0–11 (0%)
- Place: 12th
- Playoff finish: Did not qualify

Kia Picanto (PBA team) seasons

The 2016–17 Kia Picanto season was the 3rd season of the franchise in the Philippine Basketball Association (PBA). The team was known as Mahindra Floodbuster for the Philippine Cup and Commissioner's Cup.

== Key dates ==
=== 2016 ===
- October 30: The 2016 PBA draft took place at Midtown Atrium, Robinson Place Manila.

== Draft picks ==
=== Special draft ===
Player	Position	Nationality	PBA D-League team	College
Russel Escoto	F/C	Philippines	Phoenix Accelerators	FEU

=== Regular draft ===
Round	Pick	Player	Position	Nationality	PBA D-League team	College
2	4	Joseph Eriobu	F	Hong Kong	Caida Tile Masters	Mapua
3	17	Cedrick Ablaza	F	Philippines	Cagayan Rising Suns	STI
4	19	Jan Niccolo Jamon	G	Philippines	Cafe France Bakers	EAC
5	23	Paolo Pontejos	G	Philippines	Wang's Basketball Couriers	JRU

== Roster ==
2016–17 Kia Picanto roster
Players
Coaches

Pos.	#	POB	Name	Height	Weight	DOB (YYYY–MM–DD)	From
G	0	(Philippines)	Reden Celda (R)	5 ft 11 in (1.80 m)	165 lb (75 kg)	1992–03–01	National-U
F	1	(Philippines)	Jackson Corpuz (R)	6 ft 4 in (1.93 m)	195 lb (88 kg)	1989–02–08	Philippine Christian
G	2	(Philippines)	LA Revilla (C)	5 ft 8 in (1.73 m)	146 lb (66 kg)	1989–11–30	De La Salle
G/F	6	(Philippines)	Josan Nimes	6 ft 3 in (1.91 m)	175 lb (79 kg)	1991–05–11	Mapúa
F	7	(Philippines)	Rey Guevarra	6 ft 3 in (1.91 m)	190 lb (86 kg)	1986–11–24	Letran
G	8	(Philippines)	Philip Paniamogan	6 ft 0 in (1.83 m)	180 lb (82 kg)	1991–05–30	José Rizal
G	9	(Philippines)	Nico Elorde	5 ft 10 in (1.78 m)	155 lb (70 kg)	1991–10–04	Ateneo
F/C	12	(Philippines)	Prince Caperal	6 ft 7 in (2.01 m)	230 lb (104 kg)	1993–06–12	Arellano
F	14	(United States)	Jason Deutchman	6 ft 6 in (1.98 m)	211 lb (96 kg)	1987–09–27	San Diego State
G	17	(Philippines)	Manny Pacquiao	5 ft 6 in (1.68 m)	151 lb (68 kg)	1978–12–17	NDDU
F	21	(Philippines)	Eric Camson	6 ft 4 in (1.93 m)	228 lb (103 kg)	1990–05–12	Adamson
F	24	(Philippines)	Glenn Khobuntin	6 ft 4 in (1.93 m)	195 lb (88 kg)	1991–09–07	National-U
F	27	(Philippines)	Mark Yee (C)	6 ft 3 in (1.91 m)	170 lb (77 kg)	1982–01–04	San Sebastian (Cavite)
F	28	(Philippines)	Chito Jaime	6 ft 4 in (1.93 m)	200 lb (91 kg)	1983–10–21	AMA
F/C	33	(Philippines)	Russel Escoto (R)	6 ft 6 in (1.98 m)	210 lb (95 kg)	1992–12–04	Far Eastern
C	81	(Philippines)	Jason Ballesteros	6 ft 7 in (2.01 m)	220 lb (100 kg)	1985–10–07	San Sebastian
F	88	(Philippines)	Nico Salva	6 ft 3 in (1.91 m)	194 lb (88 kg)	1990–03–08	Ateneo

Head coach

- (Philippines) Manny Pacquiao

Assistant coach(es)

- (Philippines) Chris Gavina (1st Assistant)
- (United States) Rob Wainwright
- (Philippines) Romulo Orillosa
- (Philippines) Marlon Martin
- (Philippines) Alex Angeles
- (Japan) Rich Alvarez
- (Philippines) Joe Lipa (Consultant)

Team manager

- (Philippines) Eric Pineda
- (Philippines) Joe Ramos (Assistant)

Legend

- (C) Team captain
- (CI) Commissioner's Cup Import
- (GI) Governors' Cup Import
- (EI) EASL Import
- (DP) Unsigned draft pick
- (FA) Free agent
- (IN) Inactive
- (S) Suspended
- (R) Rookie
- Injured

Roster

== Philippine Cup ==
=== Eliminations ===
==== Standings ====
Pos	Team	W	L	PCT	GB	Qualification
1	San Miguel Beermen	10	1	.909	—	Twice-to-beat in the quarterfinals
2	Alaska Aces	7	4	.636 (Note: Head-to-head record: Alaska 1–0 Star)	3	Twice-to-beat in the quarterfinals
3	Star Hotshots	7	4	.636	3	Best-of-three quarterfinals
4	TNT KaTropa	6	5	.545 (Note: Head-to-head quotient: TNT 1.09, GlobalPort 1.00, Phoenix 0.96, Barangay Ginebra 0.94.)	4	Best-of-three quarterfinals
5	GlobalPort Batang Pier	6	5	.545	4	Best-of-three quarterfinals
6	Phoenix Fuel Masters	6	5	.545	4	Best-of-three quarterfinals
7	Barangay Ginebra San Miguel	6	5	.545	4	Twice-to-win in the quarterfinals
8	Rain or Shine Elasto Painters	5	6	.455 (Note: Eighth seed playoff: Rain or Shine 103–80 Blackwater)	5	Twice-to-win in the quarterfinals
9	Blackwater Elite	5	6	.455	5	
10	Mahindra Floodbuster	3	8	.273 (Note: Head-to-head record: Mahindra 1–0 Meralco)	7	
11	Meralco Bolts	3	8	.273	7	
12	NLEX Road Warriors	2	9	.182	8	

Source: PBA.ph

==== Game log ====
2017 PBA Philippine Cup game log
Total: 3–8
November: 0–2

Game	Date	Opponent	Score	High points	High rebounds	High assists	Location Attendance	Record
1	November 25	GlobalPort	L 75–97	Alex Mallari (17)	Alex Mallari (9)	Alex Mallari (3)	Smart Araneta Coliseum	0–1
2	November 30	Rain or Shine	L 83–105	Escoto, Mallari, Paniamogan (10)	Alex Mallari (10)	Josan Nimes (2)	Ynares Center	0–2

December : 1–3

Game	Date	Opponent	Score	High points	High rebounds	High assists	Location Attendance	Record
3	December 4	Phoenix	L 104–114	Alex Mallari (19)	Joseph Eriobu (10)	four players (2)	Smart Araneta Coliseum	0–3
4	December 11	San Miguel	L 91–94	Alex Mallari (21)	Alex Mallari (8)	Mallari, Revilla (3)	Smart Araneta Coliseum	0–4
5	December 16	Barangay Ginebra	L 70–89	Mark Yee (15)	Mark Yee (8)	Mallari, Paniamogan, Revilla (4)	Smart Araneta Coliseum	0–5
6	December 25	Blackwater	W 97–93 (OT)	Alex Mallari (23)	Mark Yee (14)	Alex Mallari (4)	Philippine Arena	1–5

January : 2–2

Game	Date	Opponent	Score	High points	High rebounds	High assists	Location Attendance	Record
7	January 11	Meralco	W 105–92	Philip Paniamogan (25)	Jason Ballesteros (8)	Alex Mallari (11)	Smart Araneta Coliseum	2–5
8	January 18	TNT	L 92–104	Alex Mallari (19)	Araña, Deutchman, Mallari (7)	Alex Mallari (5)	Cuneta Astrodome	2–6
9	January 22	Alaska	L 91–107	Alex Mallari (23)	Jason Ballesteros (6)	Alex Mallari (8)	PhilSports Arena	2–7
10	January 27	NLEX	W 106–96	Alex Mallari (30)	Ballesteros, Mallari (10)	Alex Mallari (9)	Cuneta Astrodome	3–7

February : 0–1

Game	Date	Opponent	Score	High points	High rebounds	High assists	Location Attendance	Record
11	February 1	Star	L 87–124	Mallari, Salva (15)	Jason Ballesteros (8)	LA Revilla (7)	Cuneta Astrodome	3–8

2016–17 schedule

== Commissioner's Cup ==
=== Eliminations ===
==== Standings ====
Pos	Team	W	L	PCT	GB	Qualification
1	Barangay Ginebra San Miguel	9	2	.818 (Note: Head-to-head quotient: Barangay Ginebra 1.117, San Miguel 0.990, Star 0.903)	—	Twice-to-beat in the quarterfinals
2	San Miguel Beermen	9	2	.818	—	Twice-to-beat in the quarterfinals
3	Star Hotshots	9	2	.818	—	Best-of-three quarterfinals
4	TNT KaTropa	8	3	.727	1	Best-of-three quarterfinals
5	Meralco Bolts	7	4	.636	2	Best-of-three quarterfinals
6	Rain or Shine Elasto Painters	5	6	.455	4	Best-of-three quarterfinals
7	Phoenix Fuel Masters	4	7	.364 (Note: Head-to-head quotient: Phoenix 1.127, Alaska 1.116, GlobalPort 0.791; eighth seed playoff: GlobalPort 107–106 Alaska)	5	Twice-to-win in the quarterfinals
8	GlobalPort Batang Pier	4	7	.364	5	Twice-to-win in the quarterfinals
9	Alaska Aces	4	7	.364	5	
10	Mahindra Floodbuster	3	8	.273	6	
11	Blackwater Elite	2	9	.182 (Note: Head-to-head record: Blackwater 1–0 NLEX)	7	
12	NLEX Road Warriors	2	9	.182	7	

Source: PBA.ph

==== Game log ====
2017 PBA Commissioner's Cup game log
Total: 3–8
March: 1–3

Game	Date	Opponent	Score	High points	High rebounds	High assists	Location Attendance	Record
1	March 17	Meralco	L 86–94	James White (33)	James White (16)	Alex Mallari (7)	Smart Araneta Coliseum	0–1
2	March 19	Rain or Shine	L 95–99 (OT)	James White (29)	James White (21)	Alex Mallari (6)	Smart Araneta Coliseum	0–2
3	March 24	NLEX	W 89–81	James White (30)	James White (23)	LA Revilla (5)	Smart Araneta Coliseum	1–2
4	March 29	Alaska	L 92–98	James White (30)	James White (14)	Celda, Mallari (4)	Mall of Asia Arena	1–3

April : 0–4

Game	Date	Opponent	Score	High points	High rebounds	High assists	Location Attendance	Record
5	April 5	Star	L 83–97	Alex Mallari (24)	Keith Wright (14)	Keith Wright (5)	Smart Araneta Coliseum	1–4
6	April 9	TNT	L 84–86	Keith Wright (26)	Keith Wright (13)	Keith Wright (4)	Mall of Asia Arena	1–5
7	April 19	San Miguel	L 80–109	Keith Wright (16)	Keith Wright (12)	LA Revilla (7)	Cuneta Astrodome	1–6
8	April 23	GlobalPort	L 86–105	Keith Wright (23)	Keith Wright (9)	LA Revilla (4)	Smart Araneta Coliseum	1–7
All-Star Break

May : 2–0

Game	Date	Opponent	Score	High points	High rebounds	High assists	Location Attendance	Record
9	May 7	Blackwater	W 96–87	Reden Celda (18)	Keith Wright (16)	Celda, Revilla (4)	Smart Araneta Coliseum	2–7
10	May 21	Phoenix	W 122–121 (OT)	LA Revilla (26)	Keith Wright (21)	LA Revilla (5)	Mall of Asia Arena	3–7

June : 0–1

Game	Date	Opponent	Score	High points	High rebounds	High assists	Location Attendance	Record
11	June 2	Barangay Ginebra	L 80–94	Keith Wright (21)	Keith Wright (22)	LA Revilla (5)	Smart Araneta Coliseum	3–8

2016–17 schedule

== Governors' Cup ==
=== Eliminations ===
==== Standings ====
Pos	Team	W	L	PCT	GB	Qualification
1	Meralco Bolts	9	2	.818	—	Twice-to-beat in the quarterfinals
2	TNT KaTropa	8	3	.727 (Note: Head-to-head record: Talk 'N Text 1–0 Barangay Ginebra)	1	Twice-to-beat in the quarterfinals
3	Barangay Ginebra San Miguel	8	3	.727	1	Twice-to-beat in the quarterfinals
4	Star Hotshots	7	4	.636 (Note: Head to-head quotient: Star 1.04, NLEX 1.01, San Miguel 0.99, Rain or Shine 0.96)	2	Twice-to-beat in the quarterfinals
5	NLEX Road Warriors	7	4	.636	2	Twice-to-win in the quarterfinals
6	San Miguel Beermen	7	4	.636	2	Twice-to-win in the quarterfinals
7	Rain or Shine Elasto Painters	7	4	.636	2	Twice-to-win in the quarterfinals
8	Blackwater Elite	5	6	.455	4	Twice-to-win in the quarterfinals
9	Alaska Aces	3	8	.273 (Note: Head-to-head record: Alaska 1–0 GlobalPort)	6	
10	GlobalPort Batang Pier	3	8	.273	6	
11	Phoenix Fuel Masters	2	9	.182	7	
12	Kia Picanto	0	11	.000	9	

Source: PBA.ph

==== Game log ====
2017 PBA Governors' Cup game log
Total: 0–11
July: 0–3

Game	Date	Opponent	Score	High points	High rebounds	High assists	Location Attendance	Record
1	July 19	Phoenix	L 105–118	Markeith Cummings (31)	Markeith Cummings (10)	Markeith Cummings (6)	Smart Araneta Coliseum	0–1
2	July 22	NLEX	L 93–100	Markeith Cummings (30)	Markeith Cummings (15)	Reden Celda (5)	Mall of Asia Arena	0–2
3	July 28	TNT	L 96–106	Markeith Cummings (27)	Markeith Cummings (7)	Nico Elorde (6)	Ynares Center	0–3

August : 0–4

Game	Date	Opponent	Score	High points	High rebounds	High assists	Location Attendance	Record
4	August 2	Barangay Ginebra	L 99–120	Reden Celda (21)	Jason Ballesteros (10)	LA Revilla (8)	Smart Araneta Coliseum	0–4
5	August 6	Meralco	L 97–112	Markeith Cummings (20)	Markeith Cummings (7)	LA Revilla (8)	Smart Araneta Coliseum	0–5
6	August 13	Rain or Shine	L 86–94	Markeith Cummings (30)	Markeith Cummings (12)	LA Revilla (7)	Mall of Asia Arena	0–6
7	August 20	GlobalPort	L 90–102	Markeith Cummings (37)	Markeith Cummings (6)	LA Revilla (5)	Smart Araneta Coliseum	0–7

September : 0–4

Game	Date	Opponent	Score	High points	High rebounds	High assists	Location Attendance	Record
8	September 1	Blackwater	L 97–118	Geron Johnson (28)	Jackson Corpuz (10)	Geron Johnson (6)	Ynares Center	0–8
9	September 10	Alaska	L 94–102	Geron Johnson (39)	Geron Johnson (9)	Geron Johnson (7)	Smart Araneta Coliseum	0–9
10	September 16	San Miguel	L 112–118	Geron Johnson (42)	Geron Johnson (10)	Geron Johnson (8)	Mall of Asia Arena	0–10
11	September 22	Star	L 81–128	Geron Johnson (27)	Corpuz, Johnson (9)	Geron Johnson (5)	Mall of Asia Arena	0–11

2016–17 schedule

== Transactions ==
=== Trades ===
==== Off-season ====
November
November 3, 2016	To Mahindra Ryan Araña (from San Miguel); 2018 1st round pick (from San Miguel); Alex Mallari (from Star)	To San Miguel Keith Agovida (from Mahindra); RR Garcia (from Star)	To Star Aldrech Ramos (from Mahindra); 2017 2nd round pick (from Star via NLEX)

November 3, 2016	To Mahindra Dennice Villamor; Franklin Bonifacio	To Barangay Ginebra Paolo Taha

==== Philippine Cup ====
February 2017
February 18, 2017	To Mahindra Prince Caperal	To Phoenix Joseph Eriobu

=== Free agency ===
==== Subtraction ====
Player	Number	Position	Reason left	New Team
Niño Canaleta	9	Forward	Waived	GlobalPort Batang Pier

=== Recruited imports ===
Conference	Name	Country	Number	Debuted	Last game	Record
Commissioner's Cup	James White	(United States)	1	March 17 (vs. Meralco)	March 29 (vs. Alaska)	1–3
Commissioner's Cup	Keith Wright	(United States)	36	April 5 (vs. Star)	May 26 (vs. Brgy. Ginebra)	2–5
Governors' Cup	Markeith Cummings	(United States)	3	July 19 (vs. Phoenix)	August 20 (vs. GlobalPort)	0–7
Governors' Cup	Geron Johnson	(United States)	55	September 1 (vs. Kia)	September 22 (vs. Star)	0–4

== Awards ==
Recipient	Award	Date awarded	Ref.
Alex Mallari	Philippine Cup Player of the Week	December 26, 2016	
