= 2016–17 Star Hotshots season =

- Head coach: Chito Victolero
- Owners: San Miguel-Pure Foods Co., Inc. (a San Miguel Corporation subsidiary)

Philippine Cup results
- Record: 7–4 (63.6%)
- Place: 3rd
- Playoff finish: Semifinalist (lost to Barangay Ginebra, 3–4)

Commissioner's Cup results
- Record: 9–2 (81.8%)
- Place: 3rd
- Playoff finish: Semifinalist (lost to San Miguel, 1–3)

Governors' Cup results
- Record: 7–4 (63.6%)
- Place: 4th
- Playoff finish: Semifinalist (lost to Meralco, 0–3)

Star Hotshots seasons

The 2016–17 Star Hotshots season was the 29th season of the franchise in the Philippine Basketball Association (PBA).

== Key dates ==
=== 2016 ===
- October 14: Star Hotshots head coach Jason Webb was appointed as team consultant. Chito Victolero took over as the Hotshots' head coach.
- October 30: The 2016 PBA draft took place at Midtown Atrium, Robinson Place Manila.

== Draft picks ==
=== Special draft ===
| Player | Position | Nationality | PBA D-League team | College |
|---|---|---|---|---|
| Jio Jalalon | G | Philippines | Caida Tile Masters | Arellano |

=== Regular draft ===
| Round | Pick | Player | Position | Nationality | PBA D-League team | College |
|---|---|---|---|---|---|---|
| 2 | 5 | Chris Javier | F | Philippines | Caida Tile Masters | UE |

== Roster ==
2016–17 Star Hotshots roster
Players
Coaches

| Pos. | # | POB | Name | Height | Weight | DOB (YYYY–MM–DD) | From |
|---|---|---|---|---|---|---|---|
| G | 2 | (Philippines) | Justin Melton | 5 ft 11 in (1.80 m) | 163 lb (74 kg) | 1987–04–07 | Mount Olive |
| G | 3 | (Philippines) | Paul Lee | 6 ft 0 in (1.83 m) | 200 lb (91 kg) | 1989–02–14 | UE |
| C | 4 | (United States) | Rafi Reavis (C) | 6 ft 8 in (2.03 m) | 210 lb (95 kg) | 1977–07–26 | Coppin State |
| G | 6 | (Philippines) | Jio Jalalon (R) | 5 ft 9 in (1.75 m) | 150 lb (68 kg) | 1992–08–02 | Arellano |
| G | 8 | (Philippines) | Peter June Simon | 6 ft 0 in (1.83 m) | 180 lb (82 kg) | 1980–06–01 | Mindanao |
| F/C | 10 | (Philippines) | Ian Sangalang | 6 ft 7 in (2.01 m) | 212 lb (96 kg) | 1991–12–20 | San Sebastian |
| F | 12 | (Philippines) | Riego Gamalinda | 6 ft 3 in (1.91 m) | 184 lb (83 kg) | 1986–05–25 | San Beda |
| G/F | 13 | (Philippines) | Gryann Mendoza | 6 ft 1 in (1.85 m) | 180 lb (82 kg) | 1990–09–09 | Far Eastern |
| G | 14 | (Philippines) | Mark Barroca | 5 ft 10 in (1.78 m) | 170 lb (77 kg) | 1986–04–25 | Far Eastern |
| F | 15 | (Philippines) | Marc Pingris | 6 ft 5 in (1.96 m) | 210 lb (95 kg) | 1981–10–16 | PSBA |
| F/C | 17 | (Philippines) | Aldrech Ramos | 6 ft 6 in (1.98 m) | 190 lb (86 kg) | 1988–04–03 | Far Eastern |
| F | 19 | (United States) | Rome dela Rosa | 6 ft 3 in (1.91 m) | 185 lb (84 kg) | 1990–12–11 | San Beda |
| G | 29 | (Philippines) | Alvin Abundo (R) | 5 ft 8 in (1.73 m) | 150 lb (68 kg) | 1992–10–29 | Centro Escolar |
| F/C | 32 | (United States) | Kyle Pascual | 6 ft 6 in (1.98 m) | 210 lb (95 kg) | 1990–04–13 | San Beda |
| F | 91 | (Philippines) | Rodney Brondial | 6 ft 5 in (1.96 m) | 210 lb (95 kg) | 1990–11–20 | Adamson |

Head coach

- (Philippines) Chito Victolero

Assistant coach(es)

- (Philippines) Jason Webb (1st Assistant)
- (Philippines) Johnny Abarrientos
- (Philippines) Mon Jose
- (Philippines) Angelito Esguerra
- (Philippines) Tony Boy Espinosa
- (Philippines) Juno Sauler

Team manager

- (Philippines) Alvin Patrimonio

Legend

- (C) Team captain
- (CI) Commissioner's Cup Import
- (GI) Governors' Cup Import
- (EI) EASL Import
- (DP) Unsigned draft pick
- (FA) Free agent
- (IN) Inactive
- (S) Suspended
- (R) Rookie
- Injured

Roster

== Philippine Cup ==
=== Eliminations ===
==== Standings ====
| Pos | Team | W | L | PCT | GB | Qualification |
|---|---|---|---|---|---|---|
| 1 | San Miguel Beermen | 10 | 1 | .909 | — | Twice-to-beat in the quarterfinals |
| 2 | Alaska Aces | 7 | 4 | .636 (Note: Head-to-head record: Alaska 1–0 Star) | 3 | Twice-to-beat in the quarterfinals |
| 3 | Star Hotshots | 7 | 4 | .636 | 3 | Best-of-three quarterfinals |
| 4 | TNT KaTropa | 6 | 5 | .545 (Note: Head-to-head quotient: TNT 1.09, GlobalPort 1.00, Phoenix 0.96, Barangay Ginebra 0.94.) | 4 | Best-of-three quarterfinals |
| 5 | GlobalPort Batang Pier | 6 | 5 | .545 | 4 | Best-of-three quarterfinals |
| 6 | Phoenix Fuel Masters | 6 | 5 | .545 | 4 | Best-of-three quarterfinals |
| 7 | Barangay Ginebra San Miguel | 6 | 5 | .545 | 4 | Twice-to-win in the quarterfinals |
| 8 | Rain or Shine Elasto Painters | 5 | 6 | .455 (Note: Eighth seed playoff: Rain or Shine 103–80 Blackwater) | 5 | Twice-to-win in the quarterfinals |
| 9 | Blackwater Elite | 5 | 6 | .455 | 5 | |
| 10 | Mahindra Floodbuster | 3 | 8 | .273 (Note: Head-to-head record: Mahindra 1–0 Meralco) | 7 | |
| 11 | Meralco Bolts | 3 | 8 | .273 | 7 | |
| 12 | NLEX Road Warriors | 2 | 9 | .182 | 8 | |

Source: PBA.ph

==== Game log ====
2017 PBA Philippine Cup game log
Total: 7–4
November: 0–1

| Game | Date | Opponent | Score | High points | High rebounds | High assists | Location Attendance | Record |
|---|---|---|---|---|---|---|---|---|
| 1 | November 20 | San Miguel | L 88–96 | Mark Barroca (13) | Lee, Sangalang (10) | Mark Barroca (4) | Smart Araneta Coliseum | 0–1 |

December : 3–2

| Game | Date | Opponent | Score | High points | High rebounds | High assists | Location Attendance | Record |
|---|---|---|---|---|---|---|---|---|
| 2 | December 2 | GlobalPort | L 84–91 | Marc Pingris (19) | Marc Pingris (8) | Jio Jalalon (5) | Smart Araneta Coliseum | 0–2 |
| 3 | December 7 | NLEX | W 99–75 | Paul Lee (20) | Marc Pingris (9) | Paul Lee (7) | Mall of Asia Arena | 1–2 |
| 4 | December 10 | Phoenix | W 123–79 | Maliksi, Lee (18) | Jalalon, Pingris (7) | Jio Jalalon (7) | Mall of Asia Arena | 2–2 |
| 5 | December 18 | Rain or Shine | W 99–91 | Peter June Simon (16) | Ian Sangalang (9) | Jio Jalalon (6) | Smart Araneta Coliseum | 3–2 |
| 6 | December 25 | Barangay Ginebra | L 79–86 | Paul Lee (20) | Marc Pingris (16) | Jio Jalalon (5) | Philippine Arena | 3–3 |

January : 3–1

| Game | Date | Opponent | Score | High points | High rebounds | High assists | Location Attendance | Record |
|---|---|---|---|---|---|---|---|---|
| 7 | January 11 | Alaska | L 90–97 (OT) | Allein Maliksi (15) | Allein Maliksi (9) | Paul Lee (4) | Smart Araneta Coliseum | 3–4 |
| 8 | January 15 | TNT | W 88–77 | Ian Sangalang (14) | Marc Pingris (8) | Mark Barroca (5) | Smart Araneta Coliseum | 4–4 |
| 9 | January 25 | Blackwater | W 111–95 | Allein Maliksi (26) | Ian Sangalang (9) | Jalalon, Paul Lee (4) | Cuneta Astrodome | 5–4 |
| 10 | January 28 | Meralco | W 120–73 | Allein Maliksi (25) | Pingris, Sangalang (7) | Paul Lee (5) | Ynares Center | 6–4 |

February : 1–0

| Game | Date | Opponent | Score | High points | High rebounds | High assists | Location Attendance | Record |
|---|---|---|---|---|---|---|---|---|
| 11 | February 1 | Mahindra | W 124–87 | Allein Maliksi (33) | Rafi Reavis (11) | Jio Jalalon (6) | Cuneta Astrodome | 7–4 |

2016–17 schedule

=== Playoffs ===
==== Bracket ====
Quarterfinals
(#1 twice-to-beat)
1 | San Miguel | 98
8 | Rain or Shine | 91
(Best-of-3)
4 | TNT | 2
5 | GlobalPort | 0
(#2 twice-to-beat)
2 | Alaska | 81 | 97
7 | Barangay Ginebra | 85 | 108
(Best-of-3)
3 | Star | 2
6 | Phoenix | 0

Semifinals (Best-of-7)
1 | San Miguel | 4
4 | TNT | 3
7 | Barangay Ginebra | 4
3 | Star | 3

Finals (Best-of-7)
1 | San Miguel | 4
7 | Barangay Ginebra | 1

==== Game log ====
2017 PBA Philippine Cup playoffs game log
Total: 5–4
Quarterfinals: 2–0

| Game | Date | Opponent | Score | High points | High rebounds | High assists | Location Attendance | Series |
|---|---|---|---|---|---|---|---|---|
| 1 | February 4 | Phoenix | W 114–83 | Paul Lee (22) | Marc Pingris (14) | Lee, Ramos (4) | Smart Araneta Coliseum | 1–0 |
| 2 | February 6 | Phoenix | W 91–71 | Paul Lee (17) | Marc Pingris (9) | Paul Lee (9) | Smart Araneta Coliseum | 2–0 |

Semifinals: 3–4

| Game | Date | Opponent | Score | High points | High rebounds | High assists | Location Attendance | Series |
|---|---|---|---|---|---|---|---|---|
| 1 | February 9 | Barangay Ginebra | W 78–74 | Paul Lee (18) | Marc Pingris (12) | Marc Pingris (5) | Smart Araneta Coliseum | 1–0 |
| 2 | February 11 | Barangay Ginebra | W 91–89 | Paul Lee (17) | Marc Pingris (8) | Jalalon, Pingris (5) | Mall of Asia Arena | 2–0 |
| 3 | February 13 | Barangay Ginebra | L 62–73 | Marc Pingris (12) | Marc Pingris (18) | Mark Barroca (4) | Mall of Asia Arena | 2–1 |
| 4 | February 15 | Barangay Ginebra | L 86–93 | Allein Maliksi (18) | Marc Pingris (13) | Lee, Pingris (2) | Smart Araneta Coliseum | 2–2 |
| 5 | February 17 | Barangay Ginebra | W 89–80 | Rafi Reavis (17) | Rafi Reavis (13) | Mark Barroca (7) | Mall of Asia Arena | 3–2 |
| 6 | February 19 | Barangay Ginebra | L 67–91 | Marc Pingris (14) | Marc Pingris (10) | Mark Barroca (4) | Smart Araneta Coliseum `18,642 | 3–3 |
| 7 | February 21 | Barangay Ginebra | L 76–89 | Allein Maliksi (22) | Pingris, Ramos (8) | Marc Pingris (6) | Mall of Asia Arena; 20,221 | 3–4 |

2016–17 schedule

== Commissioner's Cup ==
=== Eliminations ===
==== Standings ====
| Pos | Team | W | L | PCT | GB | Qualification |
|---|---|---|---|---|---|---|
| 1 | Barangay Ginebra San Miguel | 9 | 2 | .818 (Note: Head-to-head quotient: Barangay Ginebra 1.117, San Miguel 0.990, Star 0.903) | — | Twice-to-beat in the quarterfinals |
| 2 | San Miguel Beermen | 9 | 2 | .818 | — | Twice-to-beat in the quarterfinals |
| 3 | Star Hotshots | 9 | 2 | .818 | — | Best-of-three quarterfinals |
| 4 | TNT KaTropa | 8 | 3 | .727 | 1 | Best-of-three quarterfinals |
| 5 | Meralco Bolts | 7 | 4 | .636 | 2 | Best-of-three quarterfinals |
| 6 | Rain or Shine Elasto Painters | 5 | 6 | .455 | 4 | Best-of-three quarterfinals |
| 7 | Phoenix Fuel Masters | 4 | 7 | .364 (Note: Head-to-head quotient: Phoenix 1.127, Alaska 1.116, GlobalPort 0.791; eighth seed playoff: GlobalPort 107–106 Alaska) | 5 | Twice-to-win in the quarterfinals |
| 8 | GlobalPort Batang Pier | 4 | 7 | .364 | 5 | Twice-to-win in the quarterfinals |
| 9 | Alaska Aces | 4 | 7 | .364 | 5 | |
| 10 | Mahindra Floodbuster | 3 | 8 | .273 | 6 | |
| 11 | Blackwater Elite | 2 | 9 | .182 (Note: Head-to-head record: Blackwater 1–0 NLEX) | 7 | |
| 12 | NLEX Road Warriors | 2 | 9 | .182 | 7 | |

Source: PBA.ph

==== Game log ====
2017 PBA Commissioner's Cup game log
Total: 9–2
March: 3–0

| Game | Date | Opponent | Score | High points | High rebounds | High assists | Location Attendance | Record |
|---|---|---|---|---|---|---|---|---|
| 1 | March 22 | Phoenix | W 101–82 | Tony Mitchell (24) | Tony Mitchell (16) | Jio Jalalon (4) | Smart Araneta Coliseum | 1–0 |
| 2 | March 25 | GlobalPort | W 103–77 | Tony Mitchell (22) | Tony Mitchell (17) | Paul Lee (6) | Mindanao Civic Center Gymnasium | 2–0 |
| 3 | March 29 | NLEX | W 105–103 | Allein Maliksi (24) | Tony Mitchell (15) | Jalalon, Lee (4) | Smart Araneta Coliseum | 3–0 |

April : 2–2

| Game | Date | Opponent | Score | High points | High rebounds | High assists | Location Attendance | Record |
|---|---|---|---|---|---|---|---|---|
| 4 | April 5 | Mahindra | W 97–83 | Tony Mitchell (19) | Tony Mitchell (14) | Paul Lee (5) | Smart Araneta Coliseum | 4–0 |
| 5 | April 9 | Barangay Ginebra | L 98–113 | Tony Mitchell (22) | Tony Mitchell (9) | Jio Jalalon (6) | Mall of Asia Arena | 4–1 |
| 6 | April 16 | San Miguel | L 97–103 | Tony Mitchell (22) | Rafi Reavis (13) | Jio Jalalon (5) | Smart Araneta Coliseum | 4–2 |
| 7 | April 22 | Blackwater | W 96–90 | Tony Mitchell (17) | Tony Mitchell (15) | Barroca, Lee (5) | Mall of Asia Arena | 5–2 |
All-Star Break

May : 4–0

| Game | Date | Opponent | Score | High points | High rebounds | High assists | Location Attendance | Record |
|---|---|---|---|---|---|---|---|---|
| 8 | May 6 | Rain or Shine | W 99–93 | Paul Lee (23) | Tony Mitchell (18) | Mark Barroca (9) | Batangas City Coliseum | 6–2 |
| 9 | May 10 | TNT | W 107–97 | Ricardo Ratliffe (37) | Ricardo Ratliffe (22) | Barroca, Lee (5) | Mall of Asia Arena | 7–2 |
| 10 | May 24 | Meralco | W 108–90 | Ricardo Ratliffe (32) | Ricardo Ratliffe (13) | Justin Melton (5) | Smart Araneta Coliseum | 8–2 |
| 11 | May 31 | Alaska | W 102–98 (OT) | Ricardo Ratliffe (35) | Ricardo Ratliffe (28) | Jio Jalalon (6) | Cuneta Astrodome | 9–2 |

2016–17 schedule

=== Playoffs ===
==== Bracket ====
Quarterfinals
(#1 twice-to-beat)
1 | Barangay Ginebra | 96
8 | GlobalPort | 85
(Best-of-3)
4 | TNT | 2
5 | Meralco | 1
(#2 twice-to-beat)
2 | San Miguel | 115
7 | Phoenix | 96
(Best-of-3)
3 | Star | 2
6 | Rain or Shine | 0

Semifinals (Best-of-5)
1 | Barangay Ginebra | 1
4 | TNT | 3
2 | San Miguel | 3
3 | Star | 1

Finals (Best-of-7)
4 | TNT | 2
2 | San Miguel | 4

==== Game log ====
2017 PBA Commissioner's Cup playoffs game log
Total: 3–3
Quarterfinals: 2–0

| Game | Date | Opponent | Score | High points | High rebounds | High assists | Location Attendance | Series |
|---|---|---|---|---|---|---|---|---|
| 1 | June 5 | Rain or Shine | W 118–82 | Ricardo Ratliffe (29) | Ricardo Ratliffe (8) | Paul Lee (10) | Smart Araneta Coliseum | 1–0 |
| 2 | June 7 | Rain or Shine | W 84–69 | Ricardo Ratliffe (26) | Ricardo Ratliffe (24) | Ricardo Ratliffe (5) | Smart Araneta Coliseum | 2–0 |

Semifinals: 1–3

| Game | Date | Opponent | Score | High points | High rebounds | High assists | Location Attendance | Series |
|---|---|---|---|---|---|---|---|---|
| 1 | June 10 | San Miguel | W 109–105 | Maliksi, Ratliffe (26) | Ricardo Ratliffe (21) | Paul Lee (8) | Smart Araneta Coliseum | 1–0 |
| 2 | June 12 | San Miguel | L 76–77 | Ricardo Ratliffe (25) | Ricardo Ratliffe (35) | Melton, Ratliffe (3) | Mall of Asia Arena | 1–1 |
| 3 | June 14 | San Miguel | L 110–111 | Ricardo Ratliffe (44) | Ricardo Ratliffe (19) | Ricardo Ratliffe (7) | Smart Araneta Coliseum | 1–2 |
| 4 | June 16 | San Miguel | L 102–109 | Ricardo Ratliffe (36) | Ricardo Ratliffe (17) | Mark Barroca (6) | Mall of Asia Arena | 1–3 |

2016–17 schedule

== Governors' Cup ==
=== Eliminations ===
==== Standings ====
| Pos | Team | W | L | PCT | GB | Qualification |
|---|---|---|---|---|---|---|
| 1 | Meralco Bolts | 9 | 2 | .818 | — | Twice-to-beat in the quarterfinals |
| 2 | TNT KaTropa | 8 | 3 | .727 (Note: Head-to-head record: Talk 'N Text 1–0 Barangay Ginebra) | 1 | Twice-to-beat in the quarterfinals |
| 3 | Barangay Ginebra San Miguel | 8 | 3 | .727 | 1 | Twice-to-beat in the quarterfinals |
| 4 | Star Hotshots | 7 | 4 | .636 (Note: Head to-head quotient: Star 1.04, NLEX 1.01, San Miguel 0.99, Rain or Shine 0.96) | 2 | Twice-to-beat in the quarterfinals |
| 5 | NLEX Road Warriors | 7 | 4 | .636 | 2 | Twice-to-win in the quarterfinals |
| 6 | San Miguel Beermen | 7 | 4 | .636 | 2 | Twice-to-win in the quarterfinals |
| 7 | Rain or Shine Elasto Painters | 7 | 4 | .636 | 2 | Twice-to-win in the quarterfinals |
| 8 | Blackwater Elite | 5 | 6 | .455 | 4 | Twice-to-win in the quarterfinals |
| 9 | Alaska Aces | 3 | 8 | .273 (Note: Head-to-head record: Alaska 1–0 GlobalPort) | 6 | |
| 10 | GlobalPort Batang Pier | 3 | 8 | .273 | 6 | |
| 11 | Phoenix Fuel Masters | 2 | 9 | .182 | 7 | |
| 12 | Kia Picanto | 0 | 11 | .000 | 9 | |

Source: PBA.ph

==== Game log ====
2017 PBA Governors' Cup game log
Total: 7–4
July: 2–0

| Game | Date | Opponent | Score | High points | High rebounds | High assists | Location Attendance | Record |
|---|---|---|---|---|---|---|---|---|
| 1 | July 23 | Blackwater | W 103–86 | Peter June Simon (20) | Cinmeon Bowers (8) | Mark Barroca (7) | Smart Araneta Coliseum | 1–0 |
| 2 | July 28 | Alaska | W 101–92 | Malcolm Hill (28) | Malcolm Hill (11) | Paul Lee (5) | Ynares Center | 2–0 |

August : 2–1

| Game | Date | Opponent | Score | High points | High rebounds | High assists | Location Attendance | Record |
|---|---|---|---|---|---|---|---|---|
| 3 | August 4 | San Miguel | W 104–98 | Malcolm Hill (20) | Ian Sangalang (11) | Mark Barroca (7) | Smart Araneta Coliseum | 3–0 |
| 4 | August 23 | Phoenix | W 100–81 | Malcolm Hill (20) | Hill, Ramos (8) | three players (4) | Smart Araneta Coliseum | 4–0 |
| 5 | August 27 | Rain or Shine | L 88–92 | Malcolm Hill (26) | Malcolm Hill (20) | three players (3) | Smart Araneta Coliseum | 4–1 |

September: 3–3

| Game | Date | Opponent | Score | High points | High rebounds | High assists | Location Attendance | Record |
|---|---|---|---|---|---|---|---|---|
| 6 | September 3 | Barangay Ginebra | L 101–105 (OT) | Malcolm Hill (28) | Malcolm Hill (12) | Mark Barroca (4) | Smart Araneta Coliseum | 4–2 |
| 7 | September 9 | Meralco | L 90–96 | Malcolm Hill (28) | Malcolm Hill (10) | Jio Jalalon (7) | Sta. Rosa Multi-Purpose Complex | 4–3 |
| 8 | September 15 | GlobalPort | W 109–83 | Malcolm Hill (32) | Malcolm Hill (12) | Malcolm Hill (5) | Smart Araneta Coliseum | 5–3 |
| 9 | September 17 | TNT | L 99–104 | Kristófer Acox (18) | Kristófer Acox (18) | Jio Jalalon (8) | Ynares Center | 5–4 |
| 10 | September 22 | Kia | W 128–81 | Kristófer Acox (19) | Kristófer Acox (15) | Jio Jalalon (7) | Mall of Asia Arena | 6–4 |
| 11 | September 24 | NLEX | W 101–93 | Peter June Simon (16) | Kristófer Acox (10) | Marc Pingris (6) | Smart Araneta Coliseum | 7–4 |

2016–17 schedule

=== Playoffs ===
==== Bracket ====
Quarterfinals (Top 4 twice-to-beat)
1 | Meralco | 91 | 104
8 | Blackwater | 92 | 96
4 | Star | 89
5 | NLEX | 77
2 | TNT | 102 | 118
7 | Rain or Shine | 106 | 114
3 | Barangay Ginebra | 104
6 | San Miguel | 84

Semifinals (Best-of-5)
1 | Meralco | 3
4 | Star | 0
2 | TNT | 1
3 | Barangay Ginebra | 3

Finals (Best-of-7)
1 | Meralco | 3
3 | Barangay Ginebra | 4

==== Game log ====
2017 PBA Governors' Cup playoffs game log
Total: 1–3
Quarterfinals: 1–0

| Game | Date | Opponent | Score | High points | High rebounds | High assists | Location Attendance | Record |
|---|---|---|---|---|---|---|---|---|
| 1 | September 26 | NLEX | W 89–77 | Kristófer Acox (21) | Kristófer Acox (12) | Marc Pingris (5) | Mall of Asia Arena | 1–0 |

Semifinals : 0–3

| Game | Date | Opponent | Score | High points | High rebounds | High assists | Location Attendance | Record |
|---|---|---|---|---|---|---|---|---|
| 1 | October 1 | Meralco | L 66–72 | Jio Jalalon (15) | Kristófer Acox (16) | Jalalon, Pingris (3) | Alonte Sports Arena | 0–1 |
| 2 | October 3 | Meralco | L 74–98 | Mark Barroca (16) | Kristófer Acox (12) | Jio Jalalon (3) | Sta. Rosa Multi-Purpose Complex | 0–2 |
| 3 | October 5 | Meralco | L 88–91 (OT) | Mark Barroca (21) | Mark Barroca (12) | Mark Barroca (8) | Smart Araneta Coliseum | 0–3 |

2016–17 schedule

== Transactions ==
=== Trades ===
==== Off-Season ====
October 2016
| October 13, 2016 | To Star Paul Lee | To Rain or Shine James Yap |

November 2016
| November 3, 2016 | To Star Aldrech Ramos (from Mahindra); 2017 2nd round pick (from NLEX via Mahindra) | To San Miguel RR Garcia (from Star); Keith Agovida (from Mahindra) | To Mahindra Ryan Araña (from San Miguel); Alex Mallari (from Star); 2018 first round pick (from San Miguel) |

==== Philippine Cup ====
December 2016
| December 9, 2016 | To Star Rome dela Rosa | To Alaska Jake Pascual |

=== Recruited imports ===
| Conference | Name | Country | Number | Debuted | Last game | Record |
|---|---|---|---|---|---|---|
| Commissioner's Cup | Tony Mitchell | (United States) | 1 | March 22 (vs. Phoenix) | May 6 (vs. Rain or Shine) | 6–2 |
| Commissioner's Cup | Ricardo Ratliffe | (United States) | 20 | May 10 (vs. TNT) | June 15 (vs. San Miguel) | 6–3 |
| Governors' Cup | Cinmeon Bowers | (United States) | 1 | July 23 (vs. Blackwater) | July 23 (vs. Blackwater) | 1–0 |
| Governors' Cup | Malcolm Hill | (United States) | 21 | July 28 (vs. Alaska) | September 15 (vs. GlobalPort) | 4–3 |
| Governors' Cup | Kristófer Acox | (Iceland) | 21 | September 17 (vs. TNT) | October 5 (vs. Meralco) | 3–4 |

== Awards ==
| Recipient | Award | Date awarded | Ref. |
|---|---|---|---|
| Paul Lee | Philippine Cup Player of the Week | December 12, 2016 | |
| Allein Maliksi | Philippine Cup Player of the Week | January 30, 2017 | |
| Paul Lee | Philippine Cup Player of the Week | February 6, 2017 | |
| Mark Barroca | Commissioner's Cup Player of the Week | March 27, 2017 | |
Honors
| Jio Jalalon | All-Defensive Team | October 20, 2017 | |
