= Charles Rhodes =

American basketball player (born 1985)

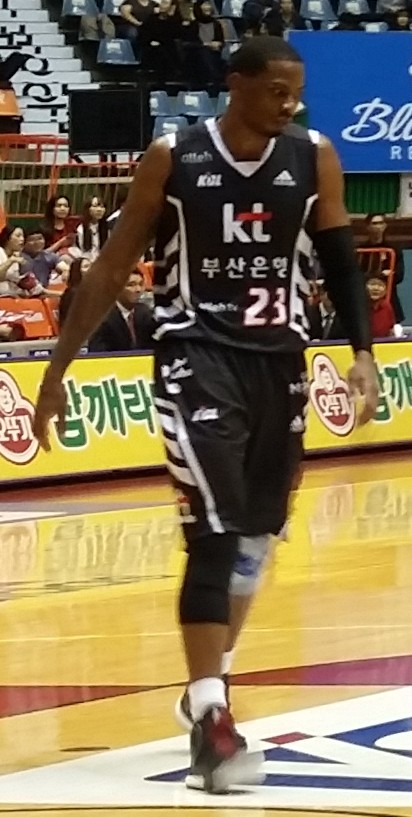

Personal information
- Born: June 25, 1985 (age 40) Galveston, Texas, U.S.
- Listed height: 6 ft 8 in (2.03 m)
- Listed weight: 240 lb (109 kg)

Career information
- High school: Lanier (Jackson, Mississippi)
- College: Mississippi State (2004–2008)
- NBA draft: 2008: undrafted
- Playing career: 2008–2023
- Position: Power forward / center

Career history
- 2008–2009: Barons/LMT Rīga
- 2010–2012: Busan KT Sonicboom
- 2012: CAI Zaragoza
- 2012: Royal Halı Gaziantep
- 2013–2014: Incheon ET Land Elephants
- 2014: Akhisar Belediyespor
- 2014–2015: Busan KT Sonicboom
- 2015–2016: Anyang KGC
- 2016–2017: Ulsan Mobis Phoebus
- 2017: San Miguel Beermen
- 2017–2018: Jeonju KCC Egis
- 2018–2019: Incheon ET Land Elephants
- 2019: San Miguel Beermen
- 2019: Shiga Lakestars
- 2019–2020: Jeonju KCC Egis
- 2021: Cimarrones del Choco
- 2022–2023: Al-Ittihad Jeddah

Career highlights
- PBA champion (2017 Commissioner's); PBA Best Import of the Conference (2017 Commissioner's); Korean League Defensive Player of the Year (2012); All-Korean League Second Team (2011); First-team All-SEC (2008); 2× Second-team All-SEC (2006, 2007)

Charles Rhodes (born June 25, 1985) is an American former professional basketball player. Coming out of high school, Charles was heavily recruited by perennial basketball powerhouses like Oklahoma, Mississippi State, Alabama, and Arkansas. Rhodes committed early on in his senior year to Mississippi State and had a solid season leading Lanier High School to a state runner up finish that year by averaging 18.4ppg, 12.1rpg, and 2.7bpg.

== College ==
As a freshman at Mississippi State University, Rhodes was used sparingly due to minor off court incidents like showing late for practices and missing a team flight to a game. Playing time was also in short supply due to senior All American Lawrence Roberts starting ahead of Rhodes. Through these setbacks, Rhodes made 16 appearances and averaged 2.9ppg and 1.9rpg in 6.5 minutes per game. At the end of the season, Rhodes declared his intention to transfer out of MSU, but after meetings with head coach Rick Stansbury, Rhodes ended up staying.

Rhodes' sophomore campaign fared much better than his first. Due to the team being quite young, Rhodes started in 25 game and was called upon to be a team leader. He responded by co-leading the team in scoring with 13.8ppg and leading the team with 7.1rpg. The increased production led to post season recognition from the AP as well as the SEC Coaches by being voted Second Team All SEC by both groups.

Entering his junior year, Rhodes was tabbed as a preseason second team ALL SEC player as well as the preseason defensive player of the year in the SEC. Again starting in 25 games, Rhodes averaged 13.7ppg and 6.2rpg through the season. Injuring his wrist in a non-conference game against Charlotte, Rhodes sat out the next game and struggled to regain his form through the following four games. Once the SEC season rolled around, Rhodes was healthy and averaged 15.4ppg in conference games. Offense always being the strong art of his game, Rhodes scored over 20 points seven times through the season. He also compiled two double doubles over the season (against University of Tennessee and West Virginia University). With the help of Rhodes, the Bulldogs fought their way to the NIT semi-finals only to lose on a last second shot to the eventual champions West Virginia. Once again, Rhodes was named to the postseason Second Team ALL-SEC by the coaches.

Following his junior year, Rhodes declared for the 2007 NBA draft. Choosing not to hire an agent allowed Rhodes to test the waters without leaving school for good. Though he was not invited to the NBA predraft workouts in Orlando, and no teams invited him for private workouts, Rhodes stayed in the draft until the last possible day. Rhodes released this official statement after withdrawing:

"I have officially withdrawn my name from the 2007 NBA Draft by faxing the required paperwork to the NBA office. The NBA put this policy in place to allow underclassmen like myself to test the draft waters, and I simply took advantage of the opportunity. I now have a better perspective on the areas of my game that I need to work on in order to improve my status for next year's draft. I'm now looking forward to getting back to work and helping my teammates compete for another championship. At the same time, it has always been a goal of mine to earn my degree from Mississippi State, and I'm in a position to accomplish that goal this coming May with another solid year in the classroom."

== Professional career ==
In the 2010–11 season, Rhodes played for Busan KT Sonicboom in South Korea. He had a successful season, leading the team to the best regular-season record for the first time in its history. He then re-signed with the team for the 2011–12 season, getting as far as the second round of the KBL playoffs.

On April 3, 2012, he signed with CAI Zaragoza in Spain.

In summer 2012, he signed with Royal Halı Gaziantep of the Turkish Basketball League.

In summer 2013, he played again in South Korea after being drafted by Incheon ET Land Elephants.

In March 2017, he was signed by the San Miguel Beermen as their import for the 2017 PBA Commissioner's Cup. The team won the cup in six games.

== Awards ==
- 2007–08 First-team All-Southeastern Conference
