= 2019 PBA Governors' Cup finals =

Basketball tournament

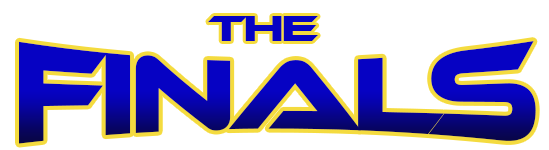
Team	Coach	Wins
(4) Barangay Ginebra San Miguel	Tim Cone	4
(2) Meralco Bolts	Norman Black	1
- Dates: January 7–17, 2020
- MVP: Japeth Aguilar (Barangay Ginebra San Miguel)
- Television: Local: ESPN5; 5 PBA Rush (HD); International: AksyonTV International
- Announcers: see Broadcast notes
- Radio network: Radyo5 (DWFM)
- Announcers: see Broadcast notes

Referees
- Game 1: N. Quilinguen, S. Pineda, M. Montoya, J. Tantay
- Game 2: J. Mariano, R. Gruta, J. Narandan, J. Jarabejo
- Game 3: P. Balao, R. Dacanay, A. Nubla, J. Baldago
- Game 4: N. Quilinguen, R. Gruta, B. Oliva, M. Flordeliza
- Game 5: P. Balao, R. Yante, J. Nicandro, J. Baldago

PBA Governors' Cup finals chronology
- < 2018 2021 >

PBA finals chronology
- < 2019 Commissioner's 2020 Philippine >

The 2019 Philippine Basketball Association (PBA) Governors' Cup finals was the best-of-7 championship series of the 2019 PBA Governors' Cup, and the conclusion of the conference's playoffs. The Barangay Ginebra San Miguel and the Meralco Bolts competed for the 19th Governors' Cup championship and the 127th overall championship contested by the league.

This was third time that Barangay Ginebra and Meralco competed for the Governors' Cup championship in the span of four seasons. Barangay Ginebra won the two previous championships against Meralco in 2016 and 2017.

Due to the adjustments done in the season calendar to give way for the preparations of the Philippines men's national basketball team for the 2019 FIBA Basketball World Cup and the Philippines' hosting of the 2019 Southeast Asian Games, the finals series started on January 7, 2020.

== Background ==
=== Road to the finals ===
Barangay Ginebra San Miguel		Meralco Bolts
Finished 7–4 (.636) in 4th place	Elimination round	Finished 8–3 (.727) in 1st place with NLEX and TNT
—N/a	Tiebreaker	Head-to-head quotient: NLEX 1.090, Meralco 0.959, TNT 0.958 (2nd place)
Def. San Miguel in one game (twice-to-beat advantage)	Quarterfinals	Def. Alaska in one game (twice-to-beat advantage)
Def. NorthPort, 3–1	Semifinals	Def. TNT, 3–2

=== Head-to-head matchup ===
ESPN5

November 3, 2019
6:45 pm

Box score

Barangay Ginebra San Miguel 77, Meralco Bolts 101
Scoring by quarter: 15–26, 17–27, 21–24, 24–24
Pts: Brownlee 18; Rebs: Brownlee 7 Asts: Tenorio 5	Pts: Durham 39; Rebs: Durham 12; Asts: Durham 7

Smart Araneta Coliseum, Quezon City
Referees: P. Balao, B. Oliva, J. Nicandro, G. Obina

== Series summary ==
Game	Date	Venue	Winner	Result
Game 1	January 7	Smart Araneta Coliseum	Barangay Ginebra	91–87
Game 2	January 10	Quezon Convention Center	Meralco	104–102
Game 3	January 12	Smart Araneta Coliseum	Barangay Ginebra	92–84
Game 4	January 15	Smart Araneta Coliseum	Barangay Ginebra	94–72
Game 5	January 17	Mall of Asia Arena	Barangay Ginebra	105–93

== Game summaries ==
=== Game 1 ===
ESPN5

January 7, 2020
7:00 pm

Box score

Barangay Ginebra San Miguel 91, Meralco Bolts 87
Scoring by quarter: 19–19, 18–22, 31–30, 23–16
Pts: Brownlee 38; Rebs: Brownlee 16; Asts: Thompson 6	Pts: Durham 25; Rebs: Durham 18; Asts: Durham 10
Barangay Ginebra leads series, 1–0

Smart Araneta Coliseum, Quezon City
Attendance: 10,708
Referees: N. Quilinguen, S. Pineda, M. Montoya, J. Tantay

=== Game 2 ===
ESPN5

January 10, 2020
7:00 pm

Box score

Barangay Ginebra San Miguel 102, Meralco Bolts 104
Scoring by quarter: 21–36, 25–27, 30–19, 26–22
Pts: Brownlee 35; Rebs: Brownlee 11; Asts: Thompson 7	Pts: Durham 21; Rebs: Durham 18; Asts: Newsome 7
Series tied, 1–1

Quezon Convention Center, Lucena
Referees: J. Mariano, R. Gruta, J. Narandan, J. Jarabejo

=== Game 3 ===
ESPN5

January 12, 2020
6:30 pm

Box score

Barangay Ginebra San Miguel 92, Meralco Bolts 84
Scoring by quarter: 24–21, 19–21, 35–16, 14–26
Pts: Brownlee 24; Rebs: Brownlee 9 Asts: Brownlee 9	Pts: Newsome 24; Rebs: Durham 13; Asts: Durham 7
Barangay Ginebra leads series, 2–1

Smart Araneta Coliseum, Quezon City
Attendance: 16,001
Referees: P. Balao, R. Dacanay, A. Nubla, J. Baldago

=== Game 4 ===
ESPN5

January 15, 2020
7:00 pm

Box score

Barangay Ginebra San Miguel 94, Meralco Bolts 72
Scoring by quarter: 14–14, 28–17, 28–24, 24–17
Pts: Brownlee 27; Rebs: J. Aguilar 9 Asts: Brownlee 8	Pts: Durham 21; Rebs: Durham 27; Asts: Durham 7
Barangay Ginebra leads series, 3–1

Smart Araneta Coliseum, Quezon City
Attendance: 11,496
Referees: N. Quilinguen, R. Gruta, B. Oliva, M. Flordeliza

=== Game 5 ===
ESPN5

January 17, 2020
7:00 pm

Box score

Barangay Ginebra San Miguel 105, Meralco Bolts 93
Scoring by quarter: 19–26, 21–20, 30–18, 35–29
Pts: J. Aguilar 25; Rebs: Thompson 9 Asts: Brownlee 10	Pts: Durham 29; Rebs: Durham 21; Asts: Durham 8
Barangay Ginebra wins series, 4–1

Mall of Asia Arena, Pasay
Attendance: 15,146
Referees: P. Balao, R. Yante, J. Nicandro, J. Baldago

== Rosters ==
Barangay Ginebra San Miguel roster
Players
Coaches

Pos.	#	POB	Name	Height	Weight	DOB (YYYY–MM–DD)	From
G/F	2	(United States)	Jared Dillinger	6 ft 4 in (1.93 m)	220 lb (100 kg)	1984–01–06	Hawaiʻi
G	5	(Philippines)	LA Tenorio	5 ft 8 in (1.73 m)	151 lb (68 kg)	1984–07–09	Ateneo
G	6	(Philippines)	Scottie Thompson	6 ft 1 in (1.85 m)	180 lb (82 kg)	1993–07–12	UPHSD
G/F	10	(United States)	Julian Sargent	6 ft 3 in (1.91 m)	205 lb (93 kg)	1991–07–15	La Salle
G	11	(United States)	Stanley Pringle	6 ft 1 in (1.85 m)	190 lb (86 kg)	1987–03–05	Penn State
F/C	12	(Philippines)	Prince Caperal	6 ft 7 in (2.01 m)	230 lb (104 kg)	1993–06–12	Arellano
G	14	(Philippines)	Teytey Teodoro (R)	5 ft 9 in (1.75 m)		1993–08–21	José Rizal
G/F	16	(Philippines)	Jeff Chan	6 ft 2 in (1.88 m)	185 lb (84 kg)	1983–02–11	Far Eastern
F	18	(Philippines)	Arthur dela Cruz	6 ft 4 in (1.93 m)	210 lb (95 kg)	1992–05–09	San Beda
C	20	(United States)	Greg Slaughter	7 ft 0 in (2.13 m)	258 lb (117 kg)	1988–05–19	Ateneo
F	23	(Philippines)	Raymond Aguilar	6 ft 4 in (1.93 m)	200 lb (91 kg)	1985–07–27	National-U
F/C	25	(Philippines)	Japeth Aguilar	6 ft 9 in (2.06 m)	235 lb (107 kg)	1987–01–25	Western Kentucky
F	31	(Philippines)	Aljon Mariano	6 ft 3 in (1.91 m)	175 lb (79 kg)	1992–08–03	UST
F	32	(United States)	Justin Brownlee (I)	6 ft 7 in (2.01 m)	219 lb (99 kg)	1988–04–23	St. John's
F	38	(United States)	Joe Devance	6 ft 7 in (2.01 m)	225 lb (102 kg)	1982–02–19	UTEP
G	47	(Philippines)	Mark Caguioa	6 ft 1 in (1.85 m)	185 lb (84 kg)	1979–11–19	Glendale CC (CA)

Head coach

- (United States) Tim Cone

Assistant coach(es)

- (Philippines) Richard del Rosario (1st assistant)
- (Philippines) Freddie Abuda
- (United States) Kirk Collier
- (Philippines) Olsen Racela

Team manager

- (Philippines) Alfrancis Chua^{[a]}
- (Philippines) Raymond Rodriguez (assistant)

Legend

- (C) Team captain
- (CI) Commissioner's Cup Import
- (GI) Governors' Cup Import
- (EI) EASL Import
- (DP) Unsigned draft pick
- (FA) Free agent
- (IN) Inactive
- (S) Suspended
- (R) Rookie
- Injured

Roster

- ^{a} Also serves as Barangay Ginebra's board governor.

Meralco Bolts roster
Players
Coaches

Pos.	#	POB	Name	Height	Weight	DOB (YYYY–MM–DD)	From
F/C	00	(Philippines)	Bryan Faundo	6 ft 6 in (1.98 m)	225 lb (102 kg)	1984–02–18	Letran
G	2	(United States)	Trevis Jackson (R)	5 ft 11 in (1.80 m)	171 lb (78 kg)	–09–13	Sacramento State
F/C	5	(United States)	Allen Durham (I)	6 ft 6 in (1.98 m)	236 lb (107 kg)	1988–07–09	Grace Christian
F	6	(Philippines)	Raymar Jose	6 ft 4 in (1.93 m)	210 lb (95 kg)	1992–08–06	Far Eastern
F	7	(United States)	Cliff Hodge	6 ft 4 in (1.93 m)	195 lb (88 kg)	1988–02–03	Reedley
F	8	(Philippines)	Nico Salva	6 ft 3 in (1.91 m)	194 lb (88 kg)	1990–03–08	Ateneo
G	9	(Philippines)	Baser Amer	6 ft 0 in (1.83 m)	170 lb (77 kg)	1992–09–29	San Beda
G	10	(Philippines)	John Pinto	5 ft 10 in (1.78 m)	195 lb (88 kg)	1990–10–15	Arellano
G/F	11	(United States)	Chris Newsome	6 ft 2 in (1.88 m)	190 lb (86 kg)	1990–06–25	Ateneo
G	17	(Philippines)	Anjo Caram	5 ft 7 in (1.70 m)	159 lb (72 kg)	1991–01–14	San Beda
C	18	(Philippines)	Jason Ballesteros	6 ft 7 in (2.01 m)	246 lb (112 kg)	1985–10–07	San Sebastian
G	19	(Philippines)	Bong Quinto (R)	6 ft 1 in (1.85 m)		1994–12–15	Letran
C	20	(Philippines)	Raymond Almazan	6 ft 8 in (2.03 m)	194 lb (88 kg)	1989–08–02	Letran
F/C	21	(Philippines)	Reynel Hugnatan (C)	6 ft 5 in (1.96 m)	210 lb (95 kg)	1978–11–03	Manila
G/F	22	(Philippines)	Allein Maliksi	6 ft 3 in (1.91 m)	180 lb (82 kg)	1987–09–18	UST
F	33	(Philippines)	Ranidel de Ocampo (IN)	6 ft 6 in (1.98 m)	210 lb (95 kg)	1981–12–08	Saint Francis of Assisi
F	81	(Philippines)	Jammer Jamito	6 ft 5 in (1.96 m)	190 lb (86 kg)	1990–09–01	St. Clare

Head coach

- (United States) Norman Black

Assistant coach(es)

- (Philippines) Ronnie Magsanoc (1st Assistant)
- (Philippines) Gene Afable
- (Philippines) Patrick Fran
- (Philippines) Christopher Tan
- (Philippines) Luigi Trillo

Team manager

- (Philippines) Paolo Trillo

Legend

- (C) Team captain
- (CI) Commissioner's Cup Import
- (GI) Governors' Cup Import
- (EI) EASL Import
- (DP) Unsigned draft pick
- (FA) Free agent
- (IN) Inactive
- (S) Suspended
- (R) Rookie
- Injured

Roster

== Broadcast notes ==
The Philippine Cup finals were aired on TV5 with simulcasts on PBA Rush (both in standard and high definition). 5's radio arm, Radyo5 provided the radio play-by-play coverage.

ESPN5 also provided online livestreaming via the PBA's official Facebook account using the TV5 feed.

The PBA Rush broadcast provided English-language coverage of the finals.

Game	ESPN5			PBA Rush (English)		
Game	Play-by-play	Analyst(s)	Courtside reporters	Play-by-play	Analyst(s)	Courtside reporters
Game 1	Magoo Marjon	Andy Jao	Denise Tan	Carlo Pamintuan	Alex Compton	Bea Escudero
Game 2	Chuck Araneta	Juan Banal	Rizza Diaz	Carlo Pamintuan	Ali Peek	Bea Escudero
Game 3	Charlie Cuna	Dominic Uy	Carla Lizardo	Carlo Pamintuan	Eric Reyes	Bea Escudero
Game 4	Magoo Marjon	Andy Jao	Selina Dagdag	Carlo Pamintuan	Dominic Uy	Bea Escudero
Game 5	Sev Sarmenta	Joaquin Henson	Denise Tan	Carlo Pamintuan	Andy Jao	Bea Escudero

- Additional Game 5 crew:
  - Trophy presentation: James Velazquez
  - Dugout celebration interviewer: Lyn Olavario
