= Sol Mercado =

Filipino-American basketball player

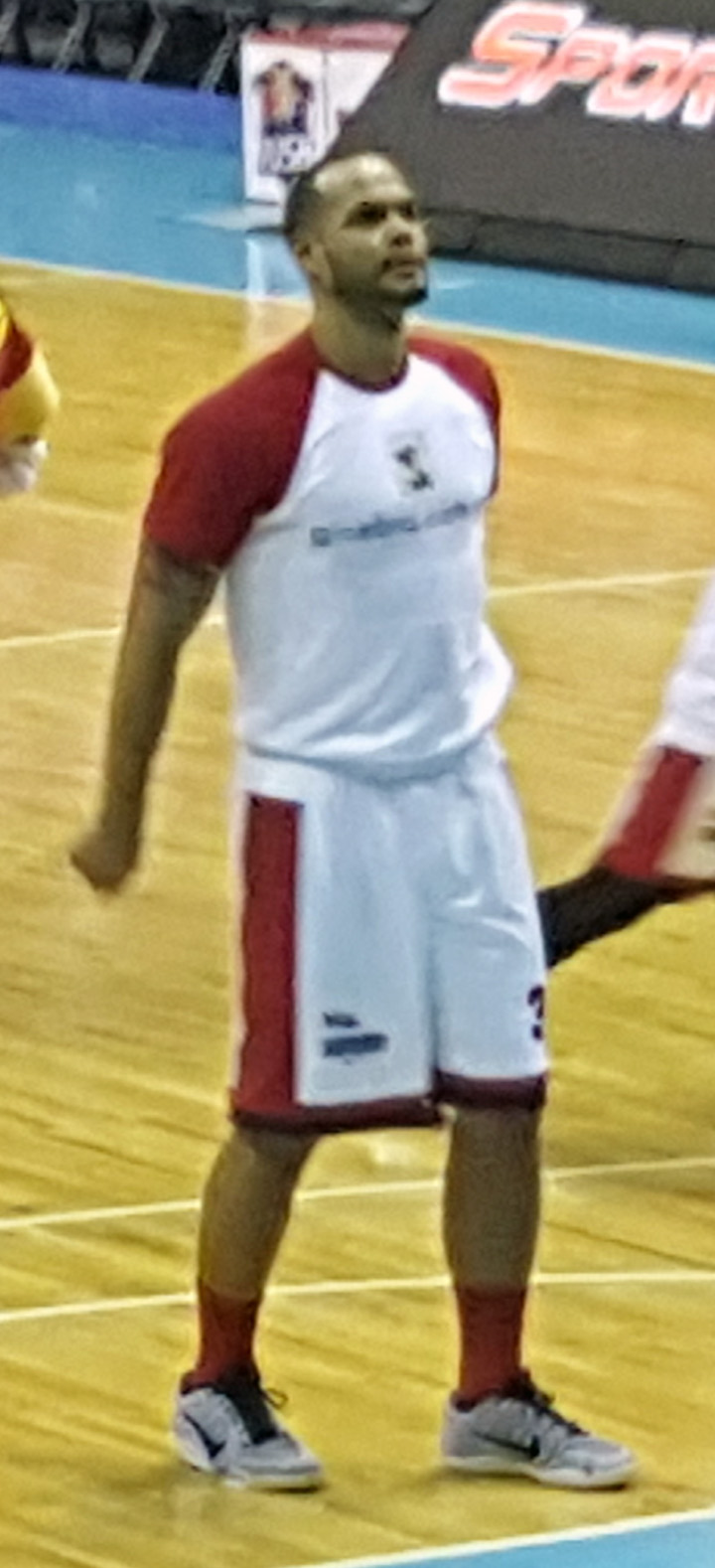
- Mercado with the Barangay Ginebra San Miguel in 2015

Personal information
- Born: May 6, 1984 (age 42) Yolo County, California, U.S.
- Listed height: 6 ft 1 in (1.85 m)
- Listed weight: 200 lb (91 kg)

Career information
- High school: Capital Christian (Sacramento, California)
- College: Biola (2003–2007)
- PBA draft: 2008: 1st round, 5th overall pick
- Drafted by: Alaska Aces
- Playing career: 2008–2019
- Position: Point guard / shooting guard

Career history
- 2008–2010: Rain or Shine Elasto Painters
- 2010–2013: Meralco Bolts
- 2013–2014: GlobalPort Batang Pier
- 2014: San Miguel Beermen
- 2014: GlobalPort Batang Pier
- 2015: Barako Bull Energy
- 2015–2019: Barangay Ginebra San Miguel
- 2019: NorthPort Batang Pier

Career highlights
- 3× PBA champion (2016 Governors', 2017 Governors', 2018 Commissioner's); 2× PBA All-Star (2010, 2012); PBA All-Rookie Team (2009); 2× PBL champion (2007-08 V-Go Extreme, 2008 Lipovitan Amino); PBL Mythical Second Team (2007–08 season)

Solomon Jemuel Rayos Mercado (born May 6, 1984) is a Filipino-American former professional basketball player in the Philippine Basketball Association (PBA). Known as the "Sol-Train", he had an impressive PBA rookie season and eventually became a reliable point guard for most of the teams he played for.

== Professional career ==
=== Rain or Shine Elasto Painters ===
Mercado was originally drafted by the Alaska Aces as the fifth pick in the 2008 PBA draft. However, he was immediately traded to the Rain or Shine Elasto Painters, together with Eddie Laure for Joe Devance and the 2009 and 2010 second-round picks of Alaska.

With all the focus on Gabe Norwood, and not much hype Mercado scored a record 29 points in his rookie debut game, the highest since Asi Taulava scored 32 points for Mobiline in his winning debut. This achievement made him the PBA Player of the Week for the opening week.

==== PBA Fiesta Conference 2009 ====
If not for a hamstring injury that sidelined him in a couple of games into their semifinal series against the Barangay Ginebra Kings, Rain or Shine would probably have gone farther in the Fiesta Conference. A member of the All-Rookie Team, Mercado finished second to teammate Gabe Norwood for Rookie of the Year honors. Mercado emerged as the team's top scorer with 13.5 points per game and his 4.5 assists per night did not only lead the team but was also number 6 overall among locals. The only glitch in his rookie season was his 2.9 turnovers per game which ranked seventh overall and led the rookies in that category.

==== Sophomore Season (Philippine Cup) ====
He was the team's cornerstone as he became one of the leaders for the Painters. He scored a career-high 35 points in a loss to Alaska. Against the Coca-Cola Tigers in a knockout game, he scored 28 points to lead them into the quarterfinals. But unfortunately they would end up short after losing to the Purefoods Tender Juicy Giants.

==== PBA Fiesta Conference 2010 ====
He averaged 17.7 points in the eliminations then had a 45-point outburst against the B-Meg Derby Ace Llamados. In another knock out game against the Tigers, he delivered crucial plays, despite fouling out, in a come from behind win. Against the Llamados in Game 3, he almost recorded a triple double with 16 points 15 assists and nine rebounds. But, in Game 5 of the series, they lost to the Llamados. During this time, he had to deal with his father being in critical condition due to a severe heart attack.

=== Meralco Bolts ===
Before the start of the 2011 PBA Commissioner's Cup, he and Jay-R Reyes were among the eight players involved in the three-way trade between Meralco, Rain or Shine and Air21 in what was easily one of the biggest trades that happened in that season. Mercado, along with Paolo Bugia were shipped to the Bolts for Beau Belga.

In a 2012 Governors' Cup game, Mercado scored 24 points in a win over the Talk ‘N Text Tropang Texters. During the 2012–13 Philippine Cup, he had 24 points and nine assists in a win over Globalport. In their quarterfinal series against Alaska, he was injured, and Meralco did not advance.

=== GlobalPort Batang Pier ===
Before the start of the 2013 PBA Commissioner's Cup, he along with Kelly Nabong, Jaypee Belencion and Yousif Aljamal were traded to GlobalPort Batang Pier for Rey Guevarra, Vic Manuel, Josh Vanlandingham and a 2015 first-round pick. This made him the first-ever player in PBA history to be traded or moved to another team after leading the league in scoring and assists the previous conference.

During the Commissioner's Cup, Mercado had three straight games where he had double-doubles. He then had to sit out the rest of the conference as not to aggravate a right shoulder injury. During the 2013 Governors' Cup, tension arose between him and his coach Junel Baculi over an uncalled timeout in a loss to the Barako Bull Energy. The following game, he bounced back as he scored all of his 15 points in the second half in a comeback win over Meralco as they came back from 20 points down. He was able to lead Globalport to its first playoff appearance, where they lost to the defending Governors' Cup champion Rain or Shine.

The following season, Mercado played a part in the early development of rookie teammate Terrence Romeo by becoming his mentor. During the 2013–14 Philippine Cup, he scored a conference-high 33 points, with 19 of those coming in the second half of a comeback win over Meralco. He missed several games due to a strain on his right Achilles.

=== San Miguel Beermen ===
Before the start of the 2014 PBA Commissioner's Cup, Mercado was traded to San Miguel in exchange for Alex Cabagnot. The 2014 PBA Governors' Cup was one of the worst conferences of his career, as he averaged just 7.6 points on 35% shooting from the field.

=== Return to GlobalPort ===
Before the 2014–15 PBA Philippine Cup trade deadline, just before the playoffs, Mercado was traded back to GlobalPort, together with San Miguel's 2018 and 2019 second-round picks, in exchange for Cabagnot. He didn't approve of the trade, comparing the trade to someone going back to a bad ex-girlfriend on his Twitter account. His only game in this stint was when Globalport was kicked out of the playoffs by Ginebra, in which he had nine points, four rebounds, and three assists.

=== Barako Bull Energy ===
On January 8, 2015, Mercado was traded again by GlobalPort, this time to Barako Bull which gave up Denok Miranda and a 2016 second-round pick. To begin the 2015 Commissioner's Cup, he had 20 points, three assists, and a steal in a winning debut over the Blackwater Elite.

=== Barangay Ginebra San Miguel ===
==== 2014–15 season ====
On May 4, 2015, before the start of 2015 PBA Governors' Cup Mercado was traded to Barangay Ginebra in exchange of Joseph Yeo. He debuted for Barangay Ginebra on May 8, 2015, with eight points and eight assists, against the team that drafted him, the Alaska Aces, but his new team lost. He missed a game that conference due to food poisoning. Against another of his former teams, Barako Bull, he scored 14 points to help Ginebra get the win. They faced Alaska in the playoffs, where he had 21 points and seven assists, but it wasn't enough as Alaska ended Ginebra's season.

==== 2015–16 season ====
In the offseason, Ginebra changed head coaches, with Tim Cone taking over. During a Philippine Cup Christmas Day game against the Star Hotshots, Mercado missed what could have been the game-winning layup and the game went into overtime. In overtime, he scored six points and made the assist to LA Tenorio for the game-winning triple. In a Commissioner's Cup loss to Talk 'N Text, he had 11 points with three three-pointers. Against Alaska in a Governors' Cup elimination game, he had 22 points but lost. He then started at small forward for the injured Chris Ellis, and contributed 19 points and four assists in a win over Meralco. He scored 19 again in a win versus Rain or Shine with six threes, becoming more adjusted to Coach Cone's system. In the playoffs, Ginebra advanced past Alaska in the quarterfinals. In the semis, they went up against sister team San Miguel, where in Game 1, he had 19 points, five assists, three boards, and one steal in 36 minutes off the bench as Ginebra went up 1–0. At the end of five games, Ginebra advanced to the Finals. There he faced his former team in Meralco. In Game 2, he defended Meralco's import Allen Durham, and scored the game-winning putback, tying the series. The following game, he got into foul trouble, allowing Durham to dominate with 36 points and 20 rebounds as Ginebra lost. After eight seasons in the PBA, he finally got his first PBA championship when Ginebra import Justin Brownlee made the game-winning three pointer in Game 6.

==== 2016–17 season ====
In a Philippine Cup loss to San Miguel, Mercado had 11 points and six rebounds. In the playoffs, he had 12 points and six assists to force a do-or-die game against Alaska. They moved on to the semis against the Hotshots where in Game 2, he missed a game-tying layup that sent Ginebra into a 0–2 deficit. He bounced back the following game with 16 points and two clutch threes that led to Star's first loss of the series. In Game 4, he got into a confrontation with Hotshots guard Jio Jalalon, but was still able to help Ginebra tie the series. In Game 6, he had a game-high 21 points (with 12 coming in the fourth quarter) while holding Paul Lee to just eight points to force a Game 7. This earned him PBA Player of the Week honors. In Game 7, he led the team with 23 points, four rebounds, and five assists while holding Lee to just four points, and Ginebra returned to the Finals. There, Ginebra fell to the Beermen in five games. During the 2017 All-Star Week, he competed in the Obstacle Challenge. In the Governors' Cup, he helped Ginebra return to the Finals for a rematch with Meralco. In Game 4 of the Finals, he sprained his left ankle when he blocked Meralco's Jared Dillinger. He wasn't able to play the rest of the Finals, but Ginebra still won its second straight Governors' Cup title.

==== 2017–18 season ====
In the Philippine Cup, Mercado helped Ginebra clinch a spot in the semifinals by putting up solid numbers against Rain or Shine. There, they lost to San Miguel in five games. In the Commissioner's Cup, he suffered a rib injury. He made his return during the Governor's Cup.

==== 2019 season ====
In a loss to the Batang Pier, Mercado had a double-double of 10 points and 11 assists. They entered the Philippine Cup playoffs as the third seed. There, they were defeated by the Hotshots. In a Commissioner's Cup win over Meralco, he had 14 points, eight assists, five rebounds, and a steal. In his final game with Ginebra, he had 12 points as Ginebra got their 1,000th franchise win.

=== NorthPort Batang Pier ===
On June 18, 2019, Mercado, along with Jervy Cruz and Kevin Ferrer, was traded back to the Batang Pier for Stanley Pringle. This was his third stint with the Batang Pier franchise. In his first game back, he started and added 14 markers, five caroms, five dimes, a steal, and a block in a win over Blackwater. He had 12 points in a win over Meralco. The Batang Pier faced Ginebra in the Governors' Cup semifinals where in Game 1, he added 14 points to a blowout of Ginebra. In Game 2 however, he twisted his ankle after stepping on Tenorio's foot, and had to leave the game. He was deemed out for the rest of the playoffs.

On January 20, 2020, Mercado was traded to the Phoenix Pulse Fuel Masters for LA Revilla and Rey Guevarra. He never played for Phoenix however as contract negotiations fell through.

== PBA career statistics ==
Legend
GP	Games played	MPG	Minutes per game
FG%	Field-goal percentage	3P%	3-point field-goal percentage	FT%	Free-throw percentage
RPG	Rebounds per game	APG	Assists per game	SPG	Steals per game
BPG	Blocks per game	PPG	Points per game	**Bold**	Career high

=== Season-by-season averages ===
Year	Team	GP	MPG	FG%	3P%	FT%	RPG	APG	SPG	BPG	PPG
2008–09	Rain or Shine	36	31.1	.389	.263	.622	3.3	4.5	.8	.1	13.5
2009–10	Rain or Shine	46	34.5	.413	.315	.683	3.8	4.6	**1.2**	.2	16.7
2010–11	Rain or Shine	29	**37.1**	.393	.282	.592	**5.0**	4.8	1.1	.2	**17.7**
2010–11	Meralco	29	**37.1**	.393	.282	.592	**5.0**	4.8	1.1	.2	**17.7**
2011–12	Meralco	37	31.5	.384	.266	.551	3.6	3.8	1.1	**.3**	13.6
2012–13	Meralco	37	35.5	.393	.272	**.691**	3.6	**6.9**	1.0	.2	16.2
2012–13	GlobalPort	37	35.5	.393	.272	**.691**	3.6	**6.9**	1.0	.2	16.2
2013–14	GlobalPort	33	30.6	.375	.191	.646	3.3	4.2	.6	.1	12.3
2013–14	San Miguel	33	30.6	.375	.191	.646	3.3	4.2	.6	.1	12.3
2014–15	San Miguel	33	26.7	.390	.200	.651	2.9	3.8	.7	.1	8.5
2014–15	GlobalPort	33	26.7	.390	.200	.651	2.9	3.8	.7	.1	8.5
2014–15	Barako Bull	33	26.7	.390	.200	.651	2.9	3.8	.7	.1	8.5
2014–15	Barangay Ginebra	33	26.7	.390	.200	.651	2.9	3.8	.7	.1	8.5
2015–16	Barangay Ginebra	48	25.0	.410	**.324**	.565	2.7	3.2	.5	.1	8.1
2016–17	Barangay Ginebra	**57**	24.4	.394	.250	.561	3.2	3.3	.7	.2	7.8
2017–18	Barangay Ginebra	44	20.6	.408	.321	.625	2.4	2.5	.8	**.3**	6.5
2019	Barangay Ginebra	39	19.6	**.415**	.278	.535	2.6	2.6	.8	.2	5.5
2019	NorthPort	39	19.6	**.415**	.278	.535	2.6	2.6	.8	.2	5.5
Career		439	28.3	.396	.275	.625	3.3	3.9	.8	.2	11.1

== International career ==
Mercado played for Puerto Rico's youth basketball teams when he was around 12–13 years old. He received offers to play for its national team.

Mercado was also a member of the Philippine National Basketball team, Smart Gilas. He was personally handpicked by Rajko Toroman alongside Kelly Williams and Asi Taulava. He played for the Philippines in the 2012 William Jones Cup. He was on the roster for the 2010 Asian Games, but didn't get to play due to injuries on both of his feet. Although he is ineligible for FIBA events, he served as a practice player for Gilas' FIBA tournaments.

=== Philippine Team Statistics ===
Year	Team	GP	MPG	FG%	3P%	FT%	RPG	APG	SPG	BPG	PPG
2012 William Jones Cup	Smart Gilas	8	17.25	.178	0.00	.575	3.125	2.875	0.5	0.125	5.63

== Personal life ==
Mercado is half-Filipino and half-Puerto Rican, with his mother Rosalie from Pampanga and his father Aaron from Puerto Rico. His father died at age 51 in 2012 due to a heart attack.

Mercado was previously engaged to actress Denise Laurel. However, on October 20, 2016, a day after Ginebra won their first title after 8 years, Laurel announced through her Instagram account that they have ended their relationship.

On September 29, 2021, Mercado and beauty queen Sandra Lemonon announced on their respective Instagram accounts that they are in a relationship. They got engaged the following year and welcomed their first son Zaiah Rafael that year as well. In 2024, they married in Bali, Indonesia.

In 2023, Mercado, along with Norwood, Devance, and Dillinger, launched a podcast known as "Let It Fly".
