= PBA Governors' Cup =

Philippine Basketball Association conference

- Most recent season or competition: 2026 PBA Governors' Cup
- The PBA Governors' Cup trophy won by Barangay Ginebra San Miguel in 2016.
- Sport: Basketball
- Founded: 1993; 33 years ago
- First season: 1993
- Most recent champion: TNT Tropang Giga (2nd title) (2024)

The PBA Governors' Cup is one of three active conferences in the Philippine Basketball Association (PBA). It is also one of two conferences, the other being the Commissioner's Cup which allows teams to hire a single foreign player, known as an "import". The Governors' Cup also refers to the trophy awarded to the champion team.

The first run of the Governors' Cup lasted from 1993 to 2002. In 2003, it was replaced by the returning Reinforced Conference, and from 2004 to 2010, the Fiesta Conference was held as the lone import-laden conference. The conference was then reinstated 2011 when the league reverted to a three-conference format.

The TNT Tropang 5G are the current defending Governors' champions, winning the 2024 PBA Governors' Cup when they were known as the TNT Tropang Giga. The San Miguel Beermen have won the most Governors' Cup titles with five.

== History ==
During the 1993 PBA season, the league renamed the Third Conference as the Governors' Cup, a reference to the members of the PBA Board of Governors. The singular name "Governor" refers to the board representative of each team. The conference usually was the last tournament held in a PBA season.

After San Miguel won the first Governors Cup in 1993, Alaska dominated the tournament from 1994-1997. In 1998, due to the league's commitment with the Philippine Centennial Team, they allowed each team to take two imports with a combined height of 12 feet. Shell, with no players taken for the national team, won the tournament over Mobiline.

San Miguel Beer won the tournament from 1999-2000 before Sta. Lucia upset the Beermen a year later, giving the Realtors its first PBA title. In 2002, due to the league's commitment to the national team, the Governors Cup became the first conference, while moving the All-Filipino Conference as its third and last tournament. Since most of the teams' star players were with the national squad, the PBA once again allowed teams to take two imports with a 12-foot maximum total height limit. Purefoods beat Alaska in seven games to win the title.

The tournament was retired in 2003 after the re-introduction of the Reinforced Conference as the third conference of the season but was eventually reactivated in 2011 after the league restored the three-conference season format.

== Tournament format ==
Between 1993 and 1994, the teams were divided into two groups in the group stage, a slightly modified post eliminations format was adopted. Instead, the top six teams will advance to the quarterfinal round for another single round robin. The top four team will then be seeded in a best-of-five series with the winners advancing to the finals.

From 1995 to 1998, the league adopted a quarterfinal-semifinal playoff format with the top two seeds advancing automatically to the semifinals and the next four teams will be matched up in the quarterfinals. The winners will advance to the semifinal round and to compete against the two top seeded teams in a best-of-five series. The winners of the semifinal round will then advance to the best-of-seven championship series.

Between 1999 and 2000, a new quarterfinal-semifinal playoff format was introduced due to the entries of the Tanduay Rhum Masters and Batang Red Bull Thunder. The top eight teams after a round-robin eliminations will advance to the quarterfinals. The top two seeds will have a twice-to-beat advantage against the last two seeded teams. Other seeded teams will compete in a best-of-three playoffs.

Between 2001 and 2002, the teams in the same group will play against each other once and against teams in the other group twice (13-games) or single (11-games). After the eliminations, the top six teams will advance to a single round-robin semifinals. A playoff incentive will be given to a team that will win five semifinal games should they fail to get the top two finals berths. The top two teams (or the No. 1 team and the winner of the playoff between team with at least 5 semifinal wins and the No. 2 team) will face each other in a best-of-seven championship series.

After the reintroduction of the tournament in 2011, the league adopted a tournament format similar on what was used in 2002. Dubbed as the "classic PBA format", the tournament begins in a single round-robin eliminations. The top six teams will advance in a single round-robin semifinals. A playoff incentive will be given to a team that will win four of their five semifinal games should they fail to get the top two finals berths. The top two teams (or the No. 1 team and the winner of the playoff between team with at least 5 semifinal wins and the No. 2 team) will face each other in a best-of-seven championship series. Two-years later in 2013, the league adopted a tournament format similar on what was used in 1998. The top two teams will gain automatic semifinals seed while the next four teams will compete in a twice-to-beat quarterfinals.

The tournament format since the 2015 edition was changed to a quarterfinal-semifinal playoff format. The top eight teams after a single round-robin group stage will advance to the quarterfinals. The top four teams will have a twice-to-beat incentive against their opponents during this round. The winners will advance to a best of five semifinal round and the winners of this round will meet in a best-of-seven championship series.

In 2024, a new format is formed. In this new format each team plays each member of their group twice with the Top 4 teams in the groups advancing to a best-of-five crossover quarterfinals. The groups' top seeds play the other group's lowest seeds while the No. 2 take on the other's No. 3 seed in a best-of-five.

== Import rules ==
The height limit for import players varies from every year. In 2011, the height adopted a handicapping system in which the top two teams of the combined results of the Philippine and Commissioner's Cups are allowed to have an import with a 6'2" (1.88 m) height limit. The next four teams will be allowed with a 6'4" (1.93 m) import and the last two teams will be allowed with a 6'6" (1.98 m) import. In 2012, the handicapping was scrapped and the league set the height limit of imports to 6'5" (1.95 m).

While the tournament is underway, a team can play with an All-Filipino lineup only once. Imports can be replaced in the whole duration of the tournament (including finals).

In 1998 and 2002 editions, the teams allowed to have two imports.

Teams were allowed to hire an additional import with Asian heritage (called as the Asian import) with a height limit of 6'3", from 2015 to 2016. The Asian heritage import provision was shelved in 2017 in lieu of the upcoming FIBA Asia Cup.

== Trophy design ==
The PBA Governors' Cup trophy won by the Purefoods TJ Hotdogs in 2002. This design was used from 1994 to 2002 and on 2011.

The trophy design used since the 1994 season features the Governors' Cup with the league logo at the front. The cup is placed in a base where all of the logos of the participating teams of the tournament are engraved. A unique feature of this trophy is that the champion team's logo is placed at the front middle of the trophy with the runner-up at its left and the third place at the right. The rest of the team logos are arranged according to their rankings at the conclusion of the tournament. Red, blue and yellow ribbons were placed in the handles of the trophy, mirroring the colors in the PBA logo. The winner keeps permanent possession of the trophy and a new one is created every year. In 2012, the trophy's cup handles were modified and the league logo was replaced with the tournament's season logo.

A prototype version of this trophy, first shown during the 1994 PBA opening ceremonies, is on display at the lobby of the PBA office in Libis, Quezon City.

== List of champions ==
=== Per season ===
Won three or more consecutive tournaments

Season	Champion	Runner-up	Series	Details
1993	San Miguel Beermen	Swift Mighty Meaty Hotdogs	4–1	tournament details
1994	Alaska Milkmen	Swift Mighty Meaties	4–2	tournament details
1995	Alaska Milkmen	San Miguel Beermen	4–3	tournament details
1996	Alaska Milkmen	Ginebra San Miguel	4–1	tournament details
1997	Alaska Milkmen	Purefoods Carne Norte Beefies	4–1	tournament details
1998	Formula Shell Zoom Masters	Mobiline Phone Pals	4–3	tournament details
1999	San Miguel Beermen	Alaska Milkmen	4–2	tournament details
2000	San Miguel Beermen	Purefoods Tender Juicy Hotdogs	4–1	tournament details
2001	Sta. Lucia Realtors	San Miguel Beermen	4–2	tournament details
2002	Purefoods Tender Juicy Hotdogs	Alaska Aces	4–3	tournament details
2003–2010: no tournament held
2010–11	Petron Blaze Boosters	Talk 'N Text Tropang Texters	4–3	tournament details
2011–12	Rain or Shine Elasto Painters	B-Meg Llamados	4–3	tournament details
2012–13	San Mig Coffee Mixers	Petron Blaze Boosters	4–3	tournament details
2013–14	San Mig Super Coffee Mixers	Rain or Shine Elasto Painters	3–2	tournament details
2014–15	San Miguel Beermen	Alaska Aces	4–0	tournament details
2015–16	Barangay Ginebra San Miguel	Meralco Bolts	4–2	tournament details
2016–17	Barangay Ginebra San Miguel	Meralco Bolts	4–3	tournament details
2017–18	Magnolia Hotshots Pambansang Manok	Alaska Aces	4–2	tournament details
2019	Barangay Ginebra San Miguel	Meralco Bolts	4–1	tournament details
2020	Cancelled due to COVID-19 pandemic			
2021	Barangay Ginebra San Miguel	Meralco Bolts	4–2	tournament details
2022–23	TNT Tropang Giga	Barangay Ginebra San Miguel	4–2	tournament details
2023–24	no tournament held due to 2023 FIBA World Cup and 2022 Asian Games			
2024–25	TNT Tropang Giga	Barangay Ginebra San Miguel	4–2	tournament details
2025–26				tournament details

=== Per franchise ===
Total	Team	Last championship
5	San Miguel/Petron	2015
4	Alaska*	1997
4	Magnolia/San Mig Super Coffee/San Mig Coffee/Purefoods	2018
4	Barangay Ginebra	2021
2	TNT	2024
1	Shell*	1998
1	Sta. Lucia*	2001
1	Rain or Shine	2012

* Defunct franchise

== Individual awards ==
=== Best Player of the Conference ===
^	Denotes player who is still active in the PBA
*	Inducted into the PBA Hall of Fame
Player (X)	Denotes the number of times the player has been named BPC

Season	Best Player	Team
1994	Vergel Meneses	Swift
1995	Allan Caidic	San Miguel
1996	Marlou Aquino	Ginebra
1997	Alvin Patrimonio*	Purefoods
1998	Jerry Codiñera	Purefoods
1999	Danny Seigle	San Miguel
2000	Danny Ildefonso	San Miguel
2001	Danny Ildefonso (2)	San Miguel
2002	Rey Evangelista	Purefoods
2011	Arwind Santos	Petron
2012	Mark Caguioa	Barangay Ginebra
2013	Arwind Santos (2)	Petron
2014	Ranidel de Ocampo	Talk 'N Text
2015	June Mar Fajardo^	San Miguel
2016	Jayson Castro^	TNT
2017	Greg Slaughter	Barangay Ginebra
2018	Paul Lee^	Magnolia
2019	Christian Standhardinger^	NorthPort
2021	Scottie Thompson^	Barangay Ginebra
2023	Christian Standhardinger^ (2)	Barangay Ginebra
2024	June Mar Fajardo^ (2)	San Miguel

=== Bobby Parks Best Import award ===
Year	Best Import	Team
1993	(United States) Kenny Travis	San Miguel
1994	(United States) Ronnie Coleman	Pepsi
1995	(United States) Stevin Smith	Sunkist
1996	(United States) Sean Chambers	Alaska
1997	(United States) Larry Robinson	San Miguel
1998	(United States) Silas Mills	Mobiline
1999	(United States) Lamont Strothers	San Miguel
2000	(United States) Derrick Brown	Purefoods
2001	(United States) Damian Owens	Sta. Lucia
2002	(United States) Derrick Brown (2)	Purefoods
2011	(United States) Arizona Reid	Rain or Shine
2012	(United States) Jamelle Cornley	Rain or Shine
2013	(United States) Marqus Blakely	San Mig Coffee
2014	(United States) Arizona Reid (2)	Rain or Shine
2015	(United States) Romeo Travis	Alaska
2016	(United States) Allen Durham	Meralco
2017	(United States) Allen Durham (2)	Meralco
2018	(United States) Mike Harris	Alaska
2019	(United States) Allen Durham (3)	Meralco
2021	(United States) Justin Brownlee	Barangay Ginebra
2023	(United States) Rondae Hollis-Jefferson	TNT
2024	(United States) Rondae Hollis-Jefferson (2)	TNT
