= Kirk Collier =

Filipino basketball coach

Magnolia Chicken Timplados Hotshots
- Position: Assistant coach
- League: PBA

Career history

Coaching
- 2000–2004: Red Bull Barako (trainer)
- 2014–2019: Barangay Ginebra San Miguel (trainer)
- 2019–2025: Barangay Ginebra San Miguel (assistant)
- 2025–present: Philippines U–17 men (assistant)
- 2025–present: Magnolia Chicken Timplados Hotshots (assistant)

Career highlights
- As assistant coach: 4x PBA champion (2019 Governors', 2020 Philippine, 2021 Governors', 2022–23 Commissioner's)

Kirk Collier is an American skills coach and trainer serves as an assistant coach for the Magnolia Chicken Timplados Hotshots in the PBA.

== Career ==
Collier served as a skills coach for newly established Red Bull Barako under Yeng Guiao in 2000, when he was contacted by Red Bull executive Gorge Balagtas. Guiao and basketball team's general manager Andy Jao personally met him in United States. He served with the team until 2004.

Later, he served as skills coach and trainer for Barangay Ginebra San Miguel from 2014. He also serves as an assistant coach for the Barangay Ginebra San Miguel in the PBA since 2019. While at Ginebra, he defended Greg Slaugther and Japeth Aguilar against criticism labels of being "soft" and "lazy".

He was later hired under LA Tenorio's coaching staff at Philippines men's U–17 team in 2025 He also transferred as an assistant coach to Magnolia Chicken Timplados Hotshots in the same year, when Tenorio is tapped as its new head coach. Also, he was also tapped as an assistant coach for national team's 3x3 unit.
