= Grand Rapids Danger =

Basketball team in Michigan, United States

- League: ABA (2015–2017); NABL (2018–2019)
- Founded: 2015
- History: Grand Rapids Danger (2015–2019)
- Arena: Grace Christian University (2017–2019)
- Location: Wyoming, Michigan
- Team colors: Black, silver, red
- General manager: Robert Kautman
- Ownership: Allen Durham
- Championships: 0
- Website: www.dangerbasketball.com

The Grand Rapids Danger was a team in the North American Basketball League (NABL) in Grand Rapids, Michigan. The Danger played their home games at Grace Christian University.

== History ==
The team formed in 2015 and competed American Basketball Association. The next year, the team improved to a 12–5 record in the 2016–17 ABA season. The team joined the NABL in 2017 for the 2018 season.

The team is owned by Allen Durham, a native of Grand Rapids who last competed for the Meralco Bolts.

In September 2019, the team suspended its play with a "goal to restructure the organization".
