= 2016 PBA Governors' Cup finals =

Basketball tournament

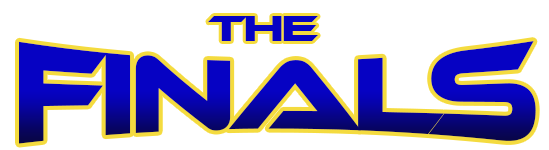
Team	Coach	Wins
(3) Barangay Ginebra San Miguel	Tim Cone	4
(4) Meralco Bolts	Norman Black	2
- Dates: October 7–19, 2016
- MVP: LA Tenorio (Barangay Ginebra San Miguel)
- Television: Local: Sports5; TV5; PBA Rush (HD); International: AksyonTV International
- Announcers: see Broadcast notes
- Radio network: Radyo5 (DWFM)
- Announcers: see Broadcast notes

Referees
- Game 1: A. Herrera, N. Quilinguen, R. Dacanay, M. Montoya
- Game 2: J. Mariano, S. Pineda, M. Flordeliza, E. Boticario
- Game 3: P. Balao, N. Guevarra, J. Narandan, E. Boticario
- Game 4: P. Balao, J. Mariano, M. Montoya, M. Flordeliza
- Game 5: N. Quilinguen, E. Tangkion, B. Oliva, E. Boticario
- Game 6: N. Quilinguen, J. Mariano, M. Montoya, J. Narandan

PBA Governors' Cup finals chronology
- < 2015 2017 >

PBA finals chronology
- < 2016 Commissioner's 2016–17 Philippine >

The 2016 Philippine Basketball Association (PBA) Governors' Cup finals was the best-of-7 championship series of the 2016 PBA Governors' Cup, and the conclusion of the conference's playoffs. The Barangay Ginebra San Miguel and Meralco Bolts competed for the 16th Governors' Cup championship and the 118th overall championship contested by the league.

Barangay Ginebra San Miguel won the series, four games to two, ending their eight-year title drought. This is the first Governors' Cup and 9th overall championship of the Ginebra franchise.

== Background ==
=== Road to the finals ===
Barangay Ginebra San Miguel		Meralco Bolts
Finished 8–3 (.727): Tied with San Miguel at 2nd place	Elimination round	Finished 6–5 (.545): Tied with Mahindra and Alaska at 4th place
.946 (3rd place)	Tiebreaker*	2–0 (head-to-head); Def. Mahindra, 104–99 (4th place)
Def. Alaska in one game, 109–104 (twice-to-beat advantage)	Quarterfinals	Def. Mahindra in one game, 105–82 (twice-to-beat advantage)
Def. San Miguel, 3–2	Semifinals	Def. TNT, 3–1

=== Head-to-head matchup ===
July 30
5:00 PM

Boxscore

Barangay Ginebra San Miguel 107, Meralco Bolts 93
Scoring by quarter: 32–21, 19–26, 30–24, 26–22
Pts: Brownlee 26; Rebs: Thompson 7 Asts: Brownlee 6	Pts: Hodge 19; Rebs: Durham 12; Asts: Durham 8

Quezon Convention Center, Lucena City, Quezon
Referees: E. Tangkion, B. Oliva, R. Dacanay, M. Montoya

== Series summary ==
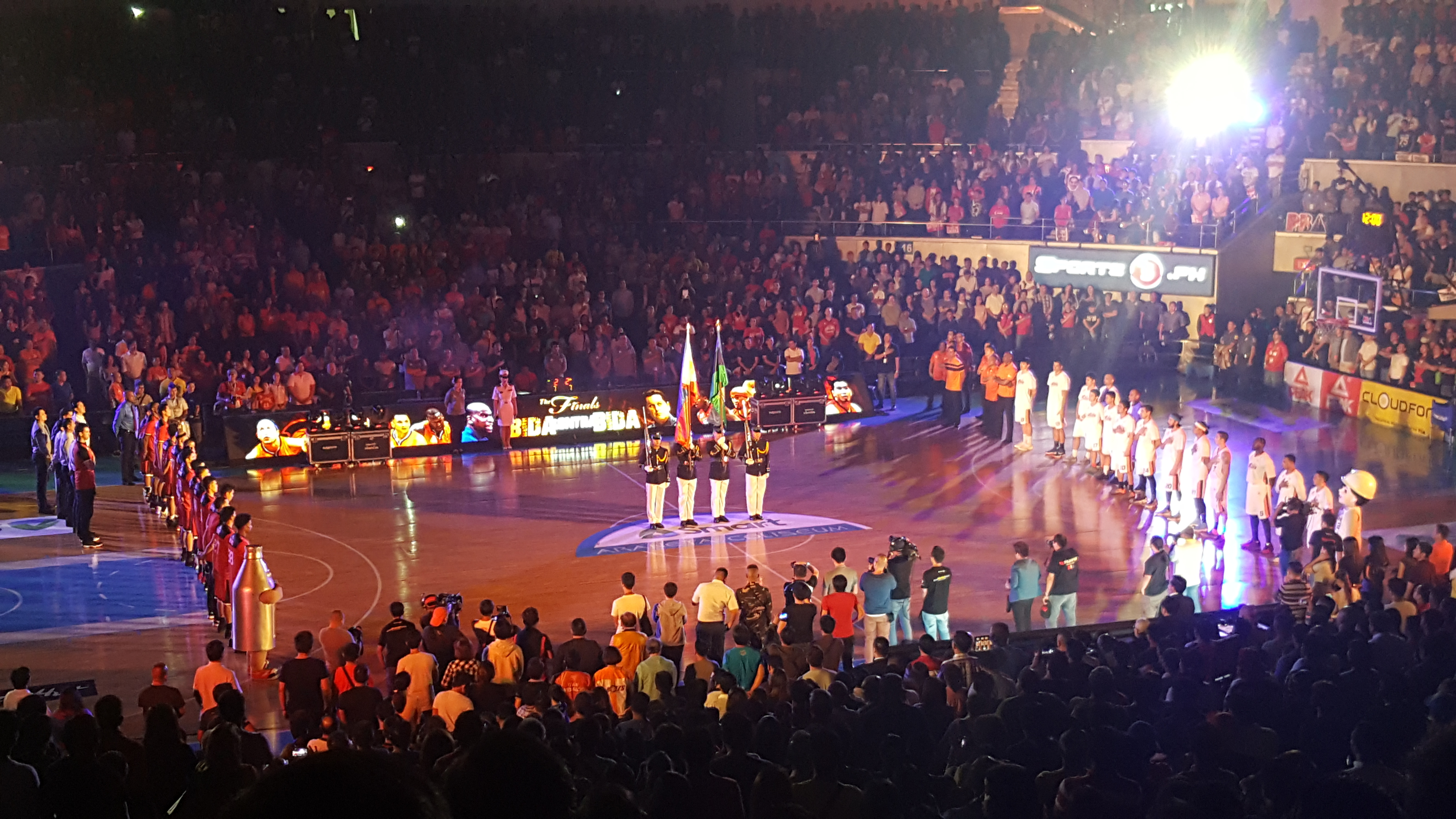
The players of Barangay Ginebra and Meralco during the player introductions before the start of game 1

Team	Game 1	Game 2	Game 3	Game 4	Game 5	Game 6	Wins
Barangay Ginebra	109	82	103	88	92	91	4
Meralco	114*	79	107	86	81	88	2
Venue	Araneta	Araneta	Araneta	Araneta	Araneta	Araneta	

*overtime

=== Game 1 ===
TV5

October 7
7:00pm

Boxscore

Barangay Ginebra San Miguel 109, Meralco Bolts 114 (OT)
Scoring by quarter: 28–31, 25–11, 27–33, 22–27, Overtime: 7–12
Pts: Tenorio 36; Rebs: Aguilar 12; Asts: Mercado, Thompson 5	Pts: Durham 46; Rebs: Durham 13; Asts: Newsome 9
Meralco leads series, 1–0

Smart Araneta Coliseum, Quezon City
Attendance: 14,522
Referees: A. Herrera, N. Quilinguen, R. Dacanay, M. Montoya

Jimmy Alapag of the Meralco Bolts sank two three-pointers, tying the all-time record for most triples in a career, which stands at 1,242, held by Allan Caidic for 17 years. The second three-pointer proved to be critical for the game as it gave the Bolts a 101–100 lead with 33 seconds remaining. However, a game-tying floater from Ginebra's LA Tenorio brought the game into overtime, with 102 apiece after the Bolts' import Allen Durham split two free throws.

In overtime, Durham started a 7–0 run of himself and Meralco never looked back, winning the very first PBA finals game of their history. He finished with 46 points, 13 boards and 7 assists, and rookie teammate Chris Newsome added 17 markers and was a rebound and assist shy of a triple-double.

=== Game 2 ===
TV5

October 9
6:30pm

Boxscore

Barangay Ginebra San Miguel 82, Meralco Bolts 79
Scoring by quarter: 24–21, 19–23, 26–16, 13–19
Pts: Brownlee 32; Rebs: Brownlee 12; Asts: Mercado 4	Pts: Durham 22; Rebs: Durham 15; Asts: Alapag 6
Series tied, 1–1

Smart Araneta Coliseum, Quezon City
Attendance: 18,287
Referees: J. Mariano, S. Pineda, M. Flordeliza, E. Boticario

Prior to the game, TNT KaTropa's Jayson Castro was awarded as the Best Player of the Conference, tying San Miguel Beermen's June Mar Fajardo with four BPC awards for second all-time. Meralco Bolts' import Allen Durham was also given the Bobby Parks Best Import of the Conference award, making him the second consecutive Bolts' reinforcement to be given with that award (Arinze Onuaku won the award during the Commissioner's Cup).

Alapag became the all-time leader for three-pointers made in a career, breaking the tie with Allan Caidic's record of 1,242 triples which he reached during Game 1. He made one three-pointer in the game to finish with 1,243 triples in his career. However, this served as a consolation for the Bolts as they lost a tight game against Ginebra. They failed to make a three-pointer in two attempts to tie the game. Barangay Ginebra then tied the series, splitting the first two games.

=== Game 3 ===
TV5

October 12
7:00pm

Boxscore

Barangay Ginebra San Miguel 103, Meralco Bolts 107
Scoring by quarter: 20–18, 24–30, 25–23, 34–36
Pts: Brownlee 42; Rebs: Brownlee 13; Asts: Thompson 7	Pts: Durham 36; Rebs: Durham 20; Asts: Newsome 7
Meralco leads series, 2–1

Smart Araneta Coliseum, Quezon City
Attendance: 14,285
Referees: P. Balao, N. Guevarra, J. Narandan, E. Boticario

=== Game 4 ===
TV5

October 14
8:10pm

Boxscore

Barangay Ginebra San Miguel 88, Meralco Bolts 86
Scoring by quarter: 20–13, 26–22, 12–39, 30–12
Pts: Aguilar 19; Rebs: Brownlee 10; Asts: Thompson 5	Pts: Durham 34; Rebs: Durham 20; Asts: Hugnatan, Newsome 7
Series tied, 2–2

Smart Araneta Coliseum, Quezon City
Attendance: 17,878
Referees: P. Balao, J. Mariano, M. Montoya, M. Flordeliza

=== Game 5 ===
TV5

October 16
6:30pm

Boxscore

Barangay Ginebra San Miguel 92, Meralco Bolts 81
Scoring by quarter: 33–19, 21–20, 19–20, 19–22
Pts: Brownlee 29; Rebs: Brownlee 10; Asts: Tenorio 8	Pts: Durham 20; Rebs: Durham 18; Asts: Durham 6
Barangay Ginebra leads series, 3–2

Smart Araneta Coliseum, Quezon City
Attendance: 22,196
Referees: N. Quilinguen, E. Tangkion, B. Oliva, E. Boticario

=== Game 6 ===
TV5

October 19
7:00pm

Boxscore

Barangay Ginebra San Miguel 91, Meralco Bolts 88
Scoring by quarter: 18–27, 14–18, 33–21, 26–22
Pts: Brownlee 31; Rebs: Aguilar, Brownlee 9 Asts: Tenorio 6	Pts: Newsome 19; Rebs: Durham, Hodge 8 Asts: Durham 10
Barangay Ginebra wins series, 4–2

Smart Araneta Coliseum, Quezon City
Attendance: 22,528
Referees: N. Quilinguen, J. Mariano, M. Montoya, J. Narandan

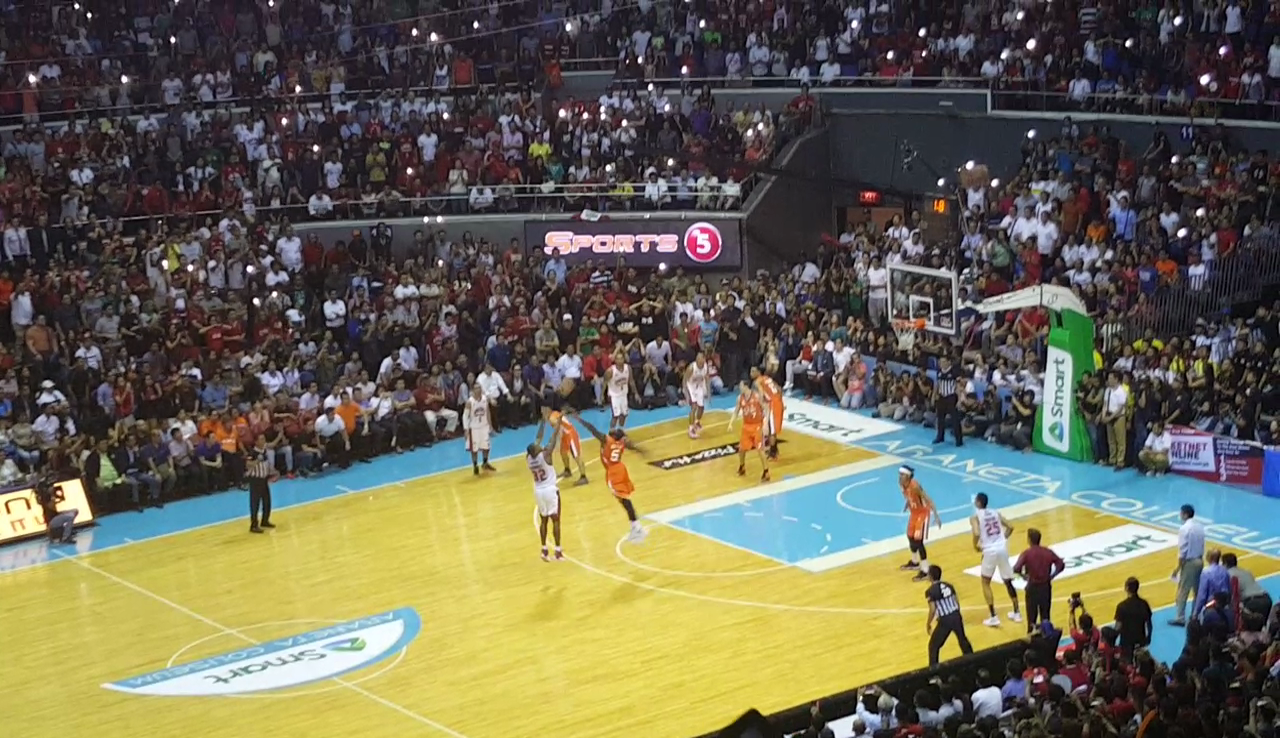
Justin Brownlee attempting the game winning three point shot in game 6

Meralco came out with an 18–4 run in the first quarter and was leading with 13 points coming into halftime. Robert Jaworski, the former playing coach of Barangay Ginebra from 1985 to 1998, was watching in the venue to support his former team. He also came to Barangay Ginebra's locker room to give some words of encouragement to the players during halftime.

LA Tenorio came out and scored 21 points in the second half to lead Barangay Ginebra's comeback.

With 5.5 seconds remaining, Barangay Ginebra had the final possession with both teams ties at 88-all. Justin Brownlee received the inbound pass and made a three-point attempt several feet behind the rainbow arc with Allen Durham closely guarding him. He made the basket as the buzzer sounded.

== Rosters ==
Barangay Ginebra San Miguel roster
Players
Coaches

Pos.	#	POB	Name	Height	Weight	DOB (YYYY–MM–DD)	From
G	0	(United States)	Franklin Bonifacio	6 ft 2 in (1.88 m)	180 lb (82 kg)	1990–03–01	Las Positas
G	3	(United States)	Sol Mercado	6 ft 1 in (1.85 m)	200 lb (91 kg)	1984–05–06	Biola
G	5	(Philippines)	LA Tenorio	5 ft 8 in (1.73 m)	151 lb (68 kg)	1984–07–09	Ateneo
G	6	(Philippines)	Scottie Thompson (R)	6 ft 1 in (1.85 m)	180 lb (82 kg)	1993–07–12	UPHSD
F/C	10	(Philippines)	Dave Marcelo	6 ft 4 in (1.93 m)	223 lb (101 kg)	1989–02–22	San Beda
G	13	(Philippines)	Jayjay Helterbrand	5 ft 11 in (1.80 m)	170 lb (77 kg)	1976–10–14	Kentucky State
F	14	(Philippines)	Nico Salva	6 ft 3 in (1.91 m)	194 lb (88 kg)	1990–03–08	Ateneo
F	19	(Philippines)	Dennice Villamor (R)	6 ft 4 in (1.93 m)	195 lb (88 kg)	1990–07–01	National-U
C	20	(United States)	Greg Slaughter (injured)	7 ft 0 in (2.13 m)	258 lb (117 kg)	1988–05–19	Ateneo
F/C	25	(Philippines)	Japeth Aguilar	6 ft 9 in (2.06 m)	235 lb (107 kg)	1987–01–25	Western Kentucky
F	27	(Philippines)	Jervy Cruz	6 ft 3 in (1.91 m)	220 lb (100 kg)	1986–09–09	UST
F	31	(Philippines)	Aljon Mariano (R)	6 ft 3 in (1.91 m)	175 lb (79 kg)	1992–08–03	UST
F	32	(United States)	Justin Brownlee (I)	6 ft 6 in (1.98 m)	220 lb (100 kg)	1988–04–23	St. John's
G/F	34	(United States)	Chris Ellis	6 ft 5 in (1.96 m)	185 lb (84 kg)	1988–12–05	Mary Hardin–Baylor
F	38	(United States)	Joe Devance	6 ft 7 in (2.01 m)	225 lb (102 kg)	1982–02–19	UTEP
G	47	(Philippines)	Mark Caguioa (C)	6 ft 1 in (1.85 m)	185 lb (84 kg)	1979–11–19	Glendale CC (CA)

Head coach

- (United States) Tim Cone

Assistant coach(es)

- (Philippines) Richard del Rosario (1st Assistant)
- (Philippines) Olsen Racela
- (Philippines) Freddie Abuda

Team manager

- (Philippines) Alfrancis Chua^{[a]}
- (Philippines) Raymond Rodriguez (Assistant)

Legend

- (C) Team captain
- (CI) Commissioner's Cup Import
- (GI) Governors' Cup Import
- (EI) EASL Import
- (DP) Unsigned draft pick
- (FA) Free agent
- (IN) Inactive
- (S) Suspended
- (R) Rookie
- Injured

Roster

Meralco Bolts roster
Players
Coaches

Pos.	#	POB	Name	Height	Weight	DOB (YYYY–MM–DD)	From
F/C	0	(Philippines)	Bryan Faundo	6 ft 6 in (1.98 m)	225 lb (102 kg)	1984–02–18	Letran
G	1	(Philippines)	Simon Atkins (IN)	5 ft 11 in (1.80 m)	185 lb (84 kg)	1988–07–19	De La Salle
G	3	(United States)	Jimmy Alapag (C)	5 ft 9 in (1.75 m)	160 lb (73 kg)	1977–12–30	Cal State San Bernardino
F	5	(United States)	Allen Durham (I)	6 ft 5 in (1.96 m)	185 lb (84 kg)	1988−07–09	Grace Christian
F	7	(United States)	Cliff Hodge	6 ft 4 in (1.93 m)	195 lb (88 kg)	1988–02–03	Reedley
G	9	(Philippines)	Baser Amer (R)	6 ft 0 in (1.83 m)	170 lb (77 kg)	1992–09–29	San Beda
G	10	(Philippines)	Jonathan Uyloan	6 ft 0 in (1.83 m)	185 lb (84 kg)	1983–11–26	Golden West
G	11	(United States)	Chris Newsome (R)	6 ft 2 in (1.88 m)	190 lb (86 kg)	1990–06–25	Ateneo
G	13	(Philippines)	Ryan Buenafe	6 ft 2 in (1.88 m)	225 lb (102 kg)	1990–02–01	Ateneo
G/F	15	(Philippines)	Joseph Sedurifa (R / IN)	6 ft 1 in (1.85 m)	175 lb (79 kg)	1990–09–04	Centro Escolar
G	17	(Philippines)	Anjo Caram	5 ft 7 in (1.70 m)	159 lb (72 kg)	1991–01–14	San Beda
F/C	18	(Philippines)	Justin Chua	6 ft 5 in (1.96 m)	230 lb (104 kg)	1989–07–13	Ateneo
C	19	(Philippines)	Rabeh Al-Hussaini	6 ft 7 in (2.01 m)	220 lb (100 kg)	1988–08–11	Ateneo
G/F	20	(United States)	Jared Dillinger (injured)	6 ft 4 in (1.93 m)	220 lb (100 kg)	1984–01–06	Hawaiʻi
F/C	21	(Philippines)	Reynel Hugnatan	6 ft 4 in (1.93 m)	210 lb (95 kg)	1978–11–03	Manila
F	22	(Philippines)	John Ferriols (IN)	6 ft 4 in (1.93 m)	210 lb (95 kg)	1974–09–09	USJ–R
F	23	(United States)	Kelly Nabong	6 ft 6 in (1.98 m)	227 lb (103 kg)	1988–11–17	SRJC
G/F	24	(Philippines)	Rey Guevarra	6 ft 3 in (1.91 m)	190 lb (86 kg)	1986–11–24	Letran
F	25	(Philippines)	Ken Bono (IN)	6 ft 3 in (1.91 m)	280 lb (127 kg)	1984–07–19	Adamson

Head coach

- (United States) Norman Black

Assistant coach(es)

- (Philippines) Ronnie Magsanoc (1st Assistant)
- (Philippines) Luigi Trillo
- (Philippines) Patrick Fran
- (Philippines) Xavier Nunag
- (Philippines) Gene Afable
- (Philippines) Jamike Jarin

Team manager

- (Philippines) Paolo Trillo

Legend

- (C) Team captain
- (CI) Commissioner's Cup Import
- (GI) Governors' Cup Import
- (EI) EASL Import
- (DP) Unsigned draft pick
- (FA) Free agent
- (IN) Inactive
- (S) Suspended
- (R) Rookie
- Injured

Roster

== Broadcast notes ==
The Governors' Cup finals was aired on TV5 with a separate live broadcast on PBA Rush (both in standard and high definition). TV5's radio arm, Radyo5 provided the radio play-by-play coverage.

Sports5 also provided online livestreaming via their official YouTube account using the TV5 feed. (Available only in the Philippines)

The PBA Rush broadcast aired the championship series with English-language commentary.

Game	Sports5			PBA Rush (English)		
Game	Play-by-play	Analyst(s)	Courtside reporters	Play-by-play	Analyst(s)	Courtside reporters
Game 1	Magoo Marjon	Andy Jao and Bo Perasol	Rizza Diaz	James Velasquez	Vince Hizon	Carla Lizardo
Game 2	Charlie Cuna	Dominic Uy and Jason Webb	Erika Padilla	Chuck Araneta	Jolly Escobar	Carlo Pamintuan
Game 3	Sev Sarmenta	Eric Reyes and Yeng Guiao	Sel Guevara	Jutt Sulit	Charles Tiu	Mara Aquino
Game 4	Charlie Cuna	Eric Reyes and Alex Compton	Rizza Diaz	Chiqui Reyes	Ali Peek	Chino Lui Pio
Game 5	Magoo Marjon	Dominic Uy and Alex Compton	Erika Padilla	Carlo Pamintuan	Vince Hizon	Carla Lizardo
Game 6	Charlie Cuna	Yeng Guiao and Alex Compton	Sel Guevara	Chuck Araneta	Ali Peek	Chino Lui Pio

- Additional Game 6 crew:
  - Trophy presentation: James Velasquez
  - Dugout celebration interviewer: Denise Tan
