= 2017 PBA Governors' Cup finals =

Basketball tournament

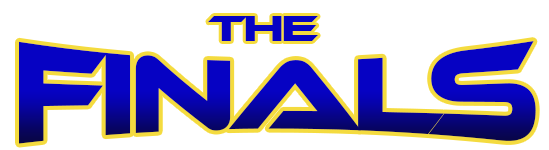
Team	Coach	Wins
(3) Barangay Ginebra San Miguel	Tim Cone	4
(1) Meralco Bolts	Norman Black	3
- Dates: October 13–27, 2017
- MVP: LA Tenorio (Barangay Ginebra San Miguel)
- Television: Local: ESPN5; TV5; PBA Rush (HD); International: AksyonTV International
- Announcers: see Broadcast notes
- Radio network: Radyo5 (DWFM)
- Announcers: see Broadcast notes

Referees
- Game 1: S. Pineda, E. Tangkion, R. Gruta, M. Flordeliza
- Game 2: P. Balao, J. Mariano, N. Guevarra, M. Orioste
- Game 3: N. Quilinguen, R. Gruta, E. Tangkion, M. Montoya
- Game 4: P. Balao, J. Mariano, N. Guevarra, M. Orioste
- Game 5: N. Quilinguen, S. Pineda, E. Tangkion, M. Montoya
- Game 6: P. Balao, J. Mariano, R. Gruta, M. Flordeliza
- Game 7: N. Quilinguen, P. Balao, J. Mariano, R. Gruta

PBA Governors' Cup finals chronology
- < 2016 2018 >

PBA finals chronology
- < 2017 Commissioner's 2017–18 Philippine >

The 2017 Philippine Basketball Association (PBA) Governors' Cup finals was the best-of-7 championship series of the 2017 PBA Governors' Cup, and the conclusion of the conference's playoffs. The Barangay Ginebra San Miguel and the Meralco Bolts competed for the 17th Governors' Cup championship and the 121st overall championship contested by the league. It was the rematch of the previous year's Governors' Cup finals.

Barangay Ginebra San Miguel won the series, four games to three, successfully defending the Governors' Cup championship. This is the second Governors' Cup and 10th overall championship of the Ginebra franchise.

== Background ==
=== Road to the finals ===
Barangay Ginebra San Miguel		Meralco Bolts
Finished 8–3 (.727): Tied with TNT in 2nd place	Elimination round	Finished 9–2 (.818): 1st place
.760 (3rd place)	Tiebreaker*	bye
Def. San Miguel in one game (twice-to-beat advantage)	Quarterfinals	Def. Blackwater in two games (twice-to-beat advantage)
Def. TNT, 3–1	Semifinals	Def. Star, 3–0

=== Head-to-head matchup ===
July 23

Box score

Barangay Ginebra San Miguel 78, Meralco Bolts 93
Scoring by quarter: 32–21, 13–22, 12–29, 21–21
Pts: Tenorio 16; Rebs: Slaughter 14; Asts: Aguilar 5	Pts: Durham 30; Rebs: Durham 24; Asts: Durham 9

Smart Araneta Coliseum, Quezon City
Referees: N. Quilinguen, E. Tangkion, B. Oliva, E. Botecario

== Series summary ==
Game	Date	Venue	Winner	Result
Game 1	October 13	Quezon Convention Center	Barangay Ginebra	102–87
Game 2	October 15	Smart Araneta Coliseum	Barangay Ginebra	86–76
Game 3	October 18	Smart Araneta Coliseum	Meralco	94–81
Game 4	October 20	Smart Araneta Coliseum	Meralco	85–83
Game 5	October 22	Philippine Arena	Barangay Ginebra	85–74
Game 6	October 25	Philippine Arena	Meralco	98–91
Game 7	October 27	Philippine Arena	Barangay Ginebra	101–96

=== Game 1 ===
ESPN5

October 13
7:00 pm

Box score

Barangay Ginebra San Miguel 102, Meralco Bolts 87
Scoring by quarter: 29–18, 20–17, 28–36, 25–16
Pts: Brownlee 32; Rebs: Brownlee 19; Asts: Mercado 8	Pts: Durham 27; Rebs: Durham 14; Asts: Durham 8
Barangay Ginebra leads series, 1–0

Quezon Convention Center, Lucena, Quezon
Referees: S. Pineda, E. Tangkion, R. Gruta, M. Flordeliza

=== Game 2 ===
ESPN5

October 15
6:30pm

Box score

Barangay Ginebra San Miguel 86, Meralco Bolts 76
Scoring by quarter: 18–24, 22–13, 17–25, 29–14
Pts: Brownlee 19; Rebs: Brownlee 13; Asts: Brownlee 7	Pts: Durham 25; Rebs: Durham 22; Asts: Durham 7
Barangay Ginebra leads series, 2–0

Smart Araneta Coliseum, Quezon City
Attendance: 16,159
Referees: P. Balao, J. Mariano, N. Guevarra, M. Orioste

=== Game 3 ===
ESPN5

October 18
7:00pm

Box score

Barangay Ginebra San Miguel 81, Meralco Bolts 94
Scoring by quarter: 21–23, 26–23, 17–20, 17–28
Pts: Brownlee 15; Rebs: Brownlee 11; Asts: J. Aguilar, Devance 4	Pts: Durham 38; Rebs: Durham 20; Asts: Newsome 12
Barangay Ginebra leads series, 2–1

Smart Araneta Coliseum, Quezon City
Referees: N. Quilinguen, R. Gruta, E. Tangkion, M. Montoya

=== Game 4 ===
ESPN5

October 20
7:00pm

Box score

Barangay Ginebra San Miguel 83, Meralco Bolts 85
Scoring by quarter: 17–17, 23–24, 23–27, 20–17
Pts: Brownlee 34; Rebs: Brownlee 14; Asts: Brownlee 7	Pts: Durham 28; Rebs: Durham 18; Asts: Dillinger 5
Series tied, 2–2

Smart Araneta Coliseum, Quezon City
Attendance: 16,164
Referees: P. Balao, J. Mariano, N. Guevarra, M. Orioste

=== Game 5 ===
ESPN5

October 22
6:30pm

Box score

Barangay Ginebra San Miguel 85, Meralco Bolts 74
Scoring by quarter: 21–15, 21–20, 24–27, 19–12
Pts: Brownlee 20; Rebs: Slaughter 16; Asts: Brownlee 5	Pts: Durham 27; Rebs: Durham 19; Asts: Amer, Durham 5
Barangay Ginebra leads series, 3–2

Philippine Arena, Bocaue, Bulacan
Attendance: 36,445
Referees: N. Quilinguen, S. Pineda, E. Tangkion, M. Montoya

=== Game 6 ===
ESPN5

October 25
7:00pm

Box score

Barangay Ginebra San Miguel 91, Meralco Bolts 98
Scoring by quarter: 17–29, 20–25, 32–21, 22–23
Pts: Brownlee 23; Rebs: Brownlee 9 Asts: Brownlee, Thompson 4	Pts: Durham 28; Rebs: Durham 19; Asts: Newsome 11
Series tied, 3–3

Philippine Arena, Bocaue, Bulacan
Attendance: 53,642
Referees: P. Balao, J. Mariano, R. Gruta, M. Flordeliza

=== Game 7 ===
ESPN5

October 27
7:00pm

Box score

Barangay Ginebra San Miguel 101, Meralco Bolts 96
Scoring by quarter: 27–19, 25–18, 29–27, 20–32
Pts: Tenorio 26; Rebs: Thompson 9 Asts: J. Aguilar, Brownlee 5	Pts: Durham 26; Rebs: Durham 24; Asts: Durham 9
Barangay Ginebra wins series, 4–3

Philippine Arena, Bocaue, Bulacan
Attendance: 54,086
Referees: N. Quilinguen, P. Balao, J. Mariano, R. Gruta

== Rosters ==
Barangay Ginebra San Miguel roster
Players
Coaches

Pos.	#	POB	Name	Height	Weight	DOB (YYYY–MM–DD)	From
G	0	(Philippines)	Paolo Taha	6 ft 0 in (1.83 m)	180 lb (82 kg)	1990–12–05	St. Benilde
G	3	(United States)	Sol Mercado	6 ft 1 in (1.85 m)	200 lb (91 kg)	1984–05–06	Biola
G	5	(Philippines)	LA Tenorio	5 ft 8 in (1.73 m)	151 lb (68 kg)	1984–07–09	Ateneo
G	6	(Philippines)	Scottie Thompson	6 ft 1 in (1.85 m)	180 lb (82 kg)	1993–07–12	UPHSD
G	13	(Philippines)	Jayjay Helterbrand	5 ft 11 in (1.80 m)	170 lb (77 kg)	1976–10–14	Kentucky State
F	14	(Philippines)	Kevin Ferrer (R)	6 ft 4 in (1.93 m)	188 lb (85 kg)	1993–03–26	UST
F	18	(Philippines)	Jammer Jamito (R)	6 ft 5 in (1.96 m)	190 lb (86 kg)	1990–09–01	St. Clare
C	20	(United States)	Greg Slaughter	7 ft 0 in (2.13 m)	258 lb (117 kg)	1988–05–19	Ateneo
F/C	23	(Philippines)	Raymond Aguilar	6 ft 5 in (1.96 m)	200 lb (91 kg)	1985–07–27	National-U
F/C	25	(Philippines)	Japeth Aguilar	6 ft 9 in (2.06 m)	235 lb (107 kg)	1987–01–25	Western Kentucky
F	27	(Philippines)	Jervy Cruz	6 ft 4 in (1.93 m)	220 lb (100 kg)	1986–09–09	UST
F	31	(Philippines)	Aljon Mariano	6 ft 3 in (1.91 m)	175 lb (79 kg)	1992–08–03	UST
F	32	(United States)	Justin Brownlee (I)	6 ft 6 in (1.98 m)	220 lb (100 kg)	1988–04–23	St. John's
F	38	(United States)	Joe Devance	6 ft 7 in (2.01 m)	225 lb (102 kg)	1982–02–19	UTEP
G	47	(Philippines)	Mark Caguioa (C)	6 ft 1 in (1.85 m)	185 lb (84 kg)	1979–11–19	Glendale CC (CA)

Head coach

- (United States) Tim Cone

Assistant coach(es)

- (Philippines) Richard del Rosario (1st Assistant)
- (Philippines) Olsen Racela
- (Philippines) Freddie Abuda

Team manager

- (Philippines) Alfrancis Chua^{[a]}
- (Philippines) Raymond Rodriguez (Assistant)

Legend

- (C) Team captain
- (CI) Commissioner's Cup Import
- (GI) Governors' Cup Import
- (EI) EASL Import
- (DP) Unsigned draft pick
- (FA) Free agent
- (IN) Inactive
- (S) Suspended
- (R) Rookie
- Injured

Roster

- ^{a} Chua also serves as Barangay Ginebra's board governor.

Meralco Bolts roster
Players
Coaches

Pos.	#	POB	Name	Height	Weight	DOB (YYYY–MM–DD)	From
F/C	0	(Philippines)	Bryan Faundo	6 ft 6 in (1.98 m)	225 lb (102 kg)	1984–02–18	Letran
G	1	(Philippines)	Simon Atkins	5 ft 11 in (1.80 m)	185 lb (84 kg)	1988–07–19	De La Salle
F	5	(United States)	Allen Durham (I)	6 ft 6 in (1.98 m)	236 lb (107 kg)	1988–07–09	Grace Christian
G	6	(Philippines)	Mike Tolomia (R)	5 ft 11 in (1.80 m)	170 lb (77 kg)	1993–01–06	Far Eastern
F	7	(United States)	Cliff Hodge	6 ft 4 in (1.93 m)	195 lb (88 kg)	1988–02–03	Reedley
G	8	(Philippines)	Joseph Yeo	6 ft 0 in (1.83 m)	190 lb (86 kg)	1983–09–07	De La Salle
G	9	(Philippines)	Baser Amer	6 ft 0 in (1.83 m)	170 lb (77 kg)	1992–09–29	San Beda
G/F	11	(United States)	Chris Newsome (C)	6 ft 2 in (1.88 m)	190 lb (86 kg)	1990–06–25	Ateneo
G	13	(Philippines)	Garvo Lanete	6 ft 2 in (1.88 m)	180 lb (82 kg)	1989–02–13	San Beda
G/F	15	(Philippines)	Joseph Sedurifa	6 ft 1 in (1.85 m)	175 lb (79 kg)	1990–09–04	Centro Escolar
G	17	(Philippines)	Anjo Caram	5 ft 7 in (1.70 m)	159 lb (72 kg)	1991–01–14	San Beda
G/F	20	(United States)	Jared Dillinger	6 ft 4 in (1.93 m)	220 lb (100 kg)	1984–01–06	Hawaiʻi
F/C	21	(Philippines)	Reynel Hugnatan	6 ft 4 in (1.93 m)	210 lb (95 kg)	1978–11–03	Manila
F/C	23	(United States)	Kelly Nabong (S)	6 ft 6 in (1.98 m)	227 lb (103 kg)	1988–11–17	SRJC
F	25	(Philippines)	Ken Bono	6 ft 5 in (1.96 m)	280 lb (127 kg)	1984–07–19	Adamson
F	33	(Philippines)	Ranidel de Ocampo	6 ft 6 in (1.98 m)	210 lb (95 kg)	1981–12–08	Saint Francis of Assisi

Head coach

- (United States) Norman Black

Assistant coach(es)

- (Philippines) Ronnie Magsanoc (1st Assistant)
- (Philippines) Gene Afable
- (Philippines) Jimmy Alapag
- (Philippines) Patrick Fran
- (Philippines) Jamike Jarin
- (Philippines) Xavier Nunag
- (Philippines) Luigi Trillo

Team manager

- (Philippines) Paolo Trillo

Legend

- (C) Team captain
- (CI) Commissioner's Cup Import
- (GI) Governors' Cup Import
- (EI) EASL Import
- (DP) Unsigned draft pick
- (FA) Free agent
- (IN) Inactive
- (S) Suspended
- (R) Rookie
- Injured

Roster

== Broadcast notes ==
The Governors' Cup finals aired on TV5 with simulcasts on PBA Rush (both in standard and high definition). TV5's radio arm, Radyo5 provided the radio play-by-play coverage.

ESPN5 also provided online livestreaming via their official YouTube account using the TV5 feed.

The PBA Rush broadcast provided English-language coverage of the finals.

Game	ESPN5			PBA Rush (English)		
Game	Play-by-play	Analyst(s)	Courtside reporters	Play-by-play	Analyst(s)	Courtside reporters
Game 1	Sev Sarmenta	Eric Menk and Eric Reyes	Rizza Diaz	Chuck Araneta	Tony dela Cruz	Mara Aquino
Game 2	Magoo Marjon	Quinito Henson and Jason Webb	Sel Guevara	James Velasquez	Jong Uichico	Apple David
Game 3	Anthony Suntay	Andy Jao and Yeng Guiao	Selina Dagdag	Carlo Pamintuan	Charles Tiu	Chino Lui Pio
Game 4	Charlie Cuna	Eric Menk and Dominic Uy	Sel Guevara	Chiqui Reyes	Ali Peek	Apple David
Game 5	Magoo Marjon	Eric Reyes and Quinito Henson	Rizza Diaz	James Velasquez	Tony dela Cruz	Carla Lizardo
Game 6	Sev Sarmenta	Dominic Uy and Andy Jao	Rizza Diaz	Carlo Pamintuan	Charles Tiu	Carla Lizardo
Game 7	Charlie Cuna	Quinito Henson and Andy Jao	Rizza Diaz	Chuck Araneta	Ali Peek	Carla Lizardo

- Additional Game 7 crew:
  - Trophy presentation: Magoo Marjon
  - Dugout celebration interviewer: Jutt Sulit
