= Allen Durham =

American basketball player

Free agent
- Position: Power forward / center

Personal information
- Born: July 9, 1988 (age 38) Wyoming, Michigan, U.S.
- Listed height: 6 ft 6 in (1.98 m)
- Listed weight: 236 lb (107 kg)

Career information
- High school: Wyoming Park (Wyoming, Michigan)
- College: Grace Bible (2006–2011)
- NBA draft: 2011: undrafted
- Playing career: 2011–present

Career history
- 2011: Dinamo Bucharest
- 2011–2012: Vilpas
- 2013: Hapoel Afula
- 2013–2014: Nantes
- 2014: Barako Bull Energy
- 2014–2015: Nantes
- 2015–2016: Texas Legends
- 2016: Nantes
- 2016: Meralco Bolts
- 2017: Club Malvin
- 2017–2018: Meralco Bolts
- 2019: Shiga Lakestars
- 2019–2020: Meralco Bolts
- 2020: Busan KT Sonicboom
- 2020–2021: Niigata Albirex BB
- 2021–2024: Ryukyu Golden Kings
- 2024: Meralco Bolts
- 2025: Saga Ballooners

Career highlights
- B.League champion (2023); B.League Finals MVP (2023); 3× PBA Best Import of the Conference (2016 Governors', 2017 Governors', 2019 Governors'); LNB Pro B Defensive Player of the Year (2014); 2x LNB Pro B All-First Team (2014, 2015); 2x LNB Pro B All-Imports Team (2014, 2015); Israeli National League All-Star (2014); 3x NCCAA Champion (2009, 2010, 2011); 3x NCCAA DII National Tournament MVP (2009, 2010, 2011); Pete Maravich Memorial Award Recipient (2011); 3x NCCAA DII 1st-Team All-American (2009, 2010, 2011); Grace Bible's College All-Time Scoring Leader; Grace Bible's College All-Time Rebounding Leader; Grace Bible's College All-Time Blocks Leader; Grace Bible's College Hall of Famer (2018)

Allen Isiah Jeremiah Durham (born July 9, 1988), nicknamed The Hulk, is an American professional basketball player for the Saga Ballooners of the B.League. Allen owns the Grand Rapids Danger of the North American Basketball League and runs a foundation under his name. He leads Grace Bible College all-time in points, rebounds, and blocks and has played in multiple leagues around the world.

== College career ==
Durham came to Grace Bible College, a Division II school in the NCCAA, after graduating from Wyoming Park in 2006. He was recruited by Coach Gary Bailey. He left after his freshman year due to financial limitations to attend Grand Rapids Community College, but didn't play basketball. He returned to Grace the following season.

Before his senior season, he had offers from several Division I schools to transfer, such as Iowa State, Central Michigan and Miami at Ohio. He scored 31 points in a win against Lincoln Christian University to move into first place on the all-time scoring leaderboard of Grace. The record previously hadn't been broken since 1966. He also became Grace's all-time leading rebounder. He won the Pete Maravich Award for men's basketball in 2011.

== Professional career ==
=== Dinamo București (2011) ===
Durham started his professional career in Romania, after signing with Dinamo București. In his first career game with the team, he recorded 32 points and 13 rebounds in an 87–94 OT loss against the CS Otopeni. In his second game with Bucuresti, he racked up 21 points, 13 rebounds and 4 assists in an 86–91 OT loss against the CSS Giurgiu. He finished his time there with 23.3 points and 13.7 rebounds (including 5.7 offensive) per game in 18 games.

=== Vilpas (2011–2012) ===
Durham then played for Salon Vilpas of Korisliiga in Finland. In his debut, he had a 27-point and 19-rebound show in an overtime match against Torpan Pojat. He then led his team with 21 points in his second game in an upset win over Tampereen Pyrintö. After going through a four-game losing streak, he helped Vilpas end it by contributing 23 points and 12 rebounds. They qualified for the playoffs for the first time since 2003, where they faced Joensuun Kataja.

=== Hapoel Afula (2013) ===
Durham then signed with Hapoel Afula along with Anthony Fisher in the Israeli National League. He averaged 21 points and 12.1 rebounds in 28 matches.

=== Nantes (2013–2014) ===
After some negotiations, Durham came to Nantes of the French Pro B. He averaged 18.6 points, 10.6 rebounds and 2.0 assists in 44 games.

=== Barako Bull Energy (2014) ===
Durham then played for the Barako Bull Energy in the Philippine Basketball Association (PBA) as a replacement import for Eric Wise, who only had one win in his stint with the team. He could have played in the PBA sooner as he could have been the import of the Air21 Express that season, and was recommended to that team by his former French league teammate Wesley Witherspoon. But he decided to rest his body until Barako Bull called him. In his PBA debut, he had 32 points, 24 rebounds and 10 assists that propelled the Energy to their second win in seven outings. He then had 28 points and 29 rebounds in an upset over the first place Talk 'N Text Tropang Texters. But they were eliminated by the Tropang Texters in the first round of the playoffs.

=== Second stint with Nantes (2014–2015) ===
In his second stint with the team, he averaged 17 points and 8.6 rebounds.

=== Texas Legends (2015–16) ===
Durham played with the Legends for 24 games in the 2015–16 season, averaging 8.8 points and 7.4 rebounds, starting seven contests.

=== Third stint with Nantes (2016) ===
Nantes announced that they had brought Durham back to close out their season, replacing Jordan Morgan. He was able to average 19 points and 10 rebounds while shooting 61% from the floor.

=== Meralco Bolts (2016) ===
After playing in France, Durham joined the Meralco Bolts, returning to the PBA. His nose was injured during a match against the Alaska Aces, which forced him to wear a mask. He initially wore a transparent face mask, which worsened his performance. He then switched to a black-colored mask, and had a 32-point, 12-rebound, and five-assist performance in his first game with the black mask. During their Finals against Barangay Ginebra San Miguel, he was awarded Best Import of the Conference. Despite winning Game 1 and going up 2–1 in the best-of-7 series after the third game, the Bolts were unable to secure the 2016 PBA Governors’ Cup title following their Game 6 loss. He only had 15 points in Game 6, and Ginebra import Justin Brownlee scored the title-winning, buzzer-beating three pointer over him.

=== Club Malvin (2017) ===
Durham then played for Club Malvín in Uruguay as a replacement for LaQuinton Ross. His team made it to the semifinals.

=== Meralco Bolts (2017–2018) ===
==== 2017 Governors' Cup ====
Durham returned to the Bolts for the 2017 Governors' Cup. In his first game back, he had 18 points and 21 rebounds, and got the win over the Blackwater Elite. He then had 30 points and 24 rebounds against the defending champions Ginebra, and almost had a triple-double in the win with nine assists. He then had another double-double of 23 points and 23 rebounds in a win against the Rain or Shine Elasto Painters on the night James Yap scored his 10,000th point. Against the Kia Picanto, he finally got a triple-double with 25 points, 13 assists, and 11 boards plus the win. When they were undermanned due to injuries and national team commitments against the Phoenix Fuel Masters, he had 33 points, 16 boards, and seven assists, and took over in the clutch to power them to the win. They lost to TNT, but he still had 39 points and 24 rebounds. They won their next game, as he put on 29 points and 27 boards on top of seven assists, three blocks, and one steal, and secured a playoffs slot. He got 26 points, 18 boards, and six assists as they handed the Aces their seventh loss in 10 games. Against the Globalport Batang Pier, he got another triple-double and a win, this time with 10 assists, 22 points and 22 boards. The Bolts finished the elimination round with nine wins against just two losses to claim the top seed and its twice-to-beat advantage.

In the playoffs, they started with a loss to Blackwater. They bounced back in the next game to move on to the next round, but he hurt his right ankle in the fourth quarter of that game. He was able to rest his ankle before their next series, which was against the Star Hotshots. The Bolts then swept the Hotshots in three games. This set them up for a Finals rematch against Ginebra. The Bolts lost Game 1, despite him putting up 27 points, 14 rebounds and seven assists. Before Game 2, he won Best Import once again, but lost that game. They bounced back in Game 3, with him putting in 38 points, 20 rebounds and five blocks, while his teammate Reynel Hugnatan stepped up with 22 points on seven three pointers. They also won Game 4 to tie the series. But in Game 5, he called out the officiating of that game as one of the reasons why they lost. As a result, he was fined P30,000. His team then forced a Game 7 with a 98–91 win in Game 6. But Ginebra closed them out in Game 7, denying Meralco the championship.

==== 2018 Governors' Cup ====
Durham returned to Meralco for the 2018 Governors' Cup. He had 27 points, 22 rebounds and eight assists, but lost to TNT. He also competed with Meralco in the 2018 FIBA Asia Champions Cup while the Governors' Cup was ongoing, settling for fourth place. Their loss to TNT kickstarted a six-game losing streak. Against the NLEX Road Warriors, he was hit on the head hard by NLEX's Dave Marcelo. Durham then scored 16 of his 36 points in the fourth quarter to end their losing streak. He then had 35 points and 26 rebounds to put Meralco closer to a playoff spot. Meralco eventually qualified for the playoffs as the seventh seed, where they upset the second-seed Phoenix. In Game 1 of their semis against Alaska, he had 32 points and 14 rebounds to lead Meralco to the win. The Bolts then lost their next three games and were eliminated by Alaska.

=== Shiga Lakestars (2019) ===
In February 2019, the Shiga Lakestars announced that Durham was going to be on their roster. He registered per-game averages of 22.3 points, 13.2 rebounds and 4.5 assists in 18 games.

=== Meralco Bolts (2019–2020) ===
Durham returned for his fourth straight year for another chance at a Governors' Cup title. Expectations were higher, with Meralco acquiring frontcourt help for him in Raymond Almazan in a trade with Rain or Shine. He missed some games as he had to fly back to the US for the birth of his first child. The Bolts lost to TnT, with TnT's import K. J. McDaniels scoring 51 points on them. Durham then had a triple-double against the San Miguel Beermen, with 29 points, 15 rebounds, and 11 assists as they won back-to-back games. They blew out Ginebra in a 24-point victory, with him having 39 points and 12 rebounds. They also blew out the Columbian Dyip with him having 34 points and 14 rebounds. Then he had 26 points and 19 rebounds against the Batang Pier. They met TnT in the semis. In Game 1, he scored half of his 32 points in the fourth quarter to try to spark a rally, but he was outplayed by McDaniels, who had 38 points and got TnT the win. In Game 2, he got a triple-double with 44 points, 19 rebounds, and 11 assists, and was able to tie the series. In Game 3, the team gave up several offensive rebounds and had a costly turnover that led to TnT winning that game. Durham, who made that costly turnover in Game 3, bounced back the next game with 36 points, forcing a do-or-die with TnT. The Bolts then won Game 5, as he got a near triple-double with 28 points, 10 rebounds, and eight assists. They moved on to the Finals, where they faced Ginebra once again. He was able to go back to the States to be with his family, as there was a Christmas break before the Finals. In Game 1 of the Finals, he had a triple-double of 25 points, 18 rebounds, and 10 assists, but was blocked by Japeth Aguilar at the rim, which sealed the win for Ginebra. They tied the series the next game, with him getting a near 20-20 double-double and his teammates stepping up. But the Bolts fell 2–1 in Game 3, and Almazan was hurt, which led to him being ruled out of the game. Before Game 4, Durham beat Brownlee once again for Best Import of the Conference. This made him the player with the most Best Import awards in the Governors' Cup, overtaking Derrick Brown and AZ Reid, and 2nd all-time for most Best Imports won, behind Bobby Parks. Once again, Meralco lost on the same night he got his Best Import award. They went on to lose Game 5, losing to them for the third time in four seasons.

=== Busan KT Sonicboom (2020) ===
After that stint with Meralco, Durham played for the Busan KT Sonicboom. He did not finish his season there, as he returned to America after South Korea reported a surge in COVID-19 cases. He became the first foreign player in the KBL to quit the league due to the novel coronavirus outbreak.

=== Niigata Albirex BB (2020–2021) ===
Durham then played for Niigata Albirex BB. In their first match against San-en NeoPhoenix, he was limited to just 14 points and nine rebounds. He bounced back the following game with 17 points and 11 rebounds to end Niigata's six-game losing streak, and stop San-en's three-game winning streak. In a win against the Shinshu Brave Warriors, he had 27 points and 12 rebounds. Niigata went on to only win 16 out of 54 games.

=== Ryukyu Golden Kings (2021–2024) ===
Durham was then signed by the Ryukyu Golden Kings of the B.League. He considered returning to the Meralco Bolts for the 2021 PBA Governors’ Cup, but Coach Norman Black advised him to take up the offer in Japan, as it was unclear whether the Governors' Cup would push through at the time. He had double-doubles in each of their wins against his former team Niigata with 15 points and 10 rebounds, and 16 points and 11 rebounds. He had another double-double of 27 points and 18 rebounds in a win over the SeaHorses Mikawa, solidifying their claim on the first seed. Their win streak ended in a loss to the Gunma Crane Thunders, despite him having 23 points and eight rebounds. Ryukyu bounced back the next game, with him having 23 points and 10 rebounds on 10-of-13 shooting. He then posted another double-double of 20 points and 13 rebounds in a win over the Toyama Grouses. He led the team with 19 points in a close win over Utsunomiya Brex. In another close win, this time against the Shinshu Brave Warriors, he had a double-double of 12 points and 13 rebounds. In a win against San-en, he led the team with 23 points and eight boards. Ryukyu got their fourth loss against Shimane Susanoo Magic. He then fired 21 points against the Osaka Evessa. In a rematch against Shinshu, he had a double-double of 25 points and 15 rebounds and got the win. In another rematch, this time against Osaka, he scored 25 points. Ryukyu eventually finished as the first seed with a record of 49–7. In the semis against Shimane, he had 19 points in Game 1, leading his team to the win. In Game 2, he fouled out, but his teammates stepped up to eliminate Shimane. In the Finals, they lost to Utsunomiya 2–0, giving Brex their first title since they were crowned champions in the league's inaugural 2016–2017 season.

=== Meralco Bolts (2024) ===
Durham returned to Meralco for the 2024 Governors' Cup for the 5th time.

On October 30, 2024, Durham announced his retirement from PBA.

=== Saga Ballooners (2025–present) ===
On January 10, 2025, Durham signed with the Saga Ballooners of the B.League.

== The Basketball Tournament ==
Durham first played in The Basketball Tournament for the 2019 edition. He helped the Jackson TN Underdawgs squad earn an Elite 8 berth after they posted three impressive wins to capture the Memphis region title, despite entering the tournament as the lowest seed (#8).

He was set to compete in the 2020 edition with Jackson TN, but their team was diagnosed with a case of COVID-19, and was replaced. They were able to compete in the 2021 edition once again.

== Career statistics ==
=== NBA G League ===
Year	Team	GP	GS	MPG	FG%	3P%	FT%	RPG	APG	SPG	BPG	PPG
2015–16	Texas Legends	24	7	23.5	.552	.444	.683	7.4	1.0	.5	.8	8.8
Career		24	7	23.5	.552	.444	.683	7.4	1.0	.5	.8	8.8

== Personal life ==
Durham operates the Grand Rapids Danger. They previously played in the American Basketball Association for two seasons and moved to the North American Basketball League (NABL) in 2018. He also runs a foundation which exposes young kids to sports.

Durham has two children. He is one of 10 siblings.
