= 2018 PBA Governors' Cup =

- Duration: August 17 – December 19, 2018
- TV partner(s): Local: ESPN 5 The 5 Network; PBA Rush (HD); International: AksyonTV International

Finals
- Champions: Magnolia Hotshots Pambansang Manok
- Runners-up: Alaska Aces

Awards
- Best Player: Paul Lee (Magnolia Hotshots Pambansang Manok)
- Best Import: Mike Harris (Alaska Aces)
- Finals MVP: Mark Barroca (Magnolia Hotshots Pambansang Manok)

PBA Governors' Cup chronology
- < 2017 2019 >

PBA conference chronology
- < 2018 Commissioner's 2019 Philippine >

The 2018 Philippine Basketball Association (PBA) Governors' Cup, also known as the 2018 Honda Click–PBA Governor's Cup for sponsorship reasons, was the third and last conference of the 2017–18 PBA season. The tournament allowed teams to hire foreign players or imports with a height limit of 6'5".

== Format ==
The tournament format for this conference is as follows:

- Single-round robin eliminations; 11 games per team; Teams are then seeded by basis on win–loss records.
- Top eight teams will advance to the quarterfinals. In case of tie, a playoff game will be held only for the #8 seed.
- Quarterfinals (higher seed with the twice-to-beat advantage):
  - QF1: #1 seed vs #8 seed
  - QF2: #2 seed vs #7 seed
  - QF3: #3 seed vs #6 seed
  - QF4: #4 seed vs #5 seed
- Semifinals (best-of-5 series):
  - SF1: QF1 vs. QF4 winners
  - SF2: QF2 vs. QF3 winners
- Finals (best-of-7 series)
  - Winners of the semifinals

== Elimination round ==
=== Team standings ===
Pos	Team	W	L	PCT	GB	Qualification
1	Barangay Ginebra San Miguel	9	2	.818	—	Twice-to-beat in quarterfinals
2	Phoenix Fuel Masters	8	3	.727 (Note: Head-to-head quotient: Phoenix 1.011, Alaska 1.006, Magnolia 0.982)	1	Twice-to-beat in quarterfinals
3	Alaska Aces	8	3	.727	1	Twice-to-beat in quarterfinals
4	Magnolia Hotshots Pambansang Manok	8	3	.727	1	Twice-to-beat in quarterfinals
5	Blackwater Elite	7	4	.636	2	Twice-to-win in quarterfinals
6	San Miguel Beermen	6	5	.545	3	Twice-to-win in quarterfinals
7	Meralco Bolts	5	6	.455 (Note: Head-to-head record: Meralco 1–0 NLEX)	4	Twice-to-win in quarterfinals
8	NLEX Road Warriors	5	6	.455	4	Twice-to-win in quarterfinals
9	TNT KaTropa	4	7	.364	5	
10	Rain or Shine Elasto Painters	3	8	.273	6	
11	NorthPort Batang Pier	2	9	.182	7	
12	Columbian Dyip	1	10	.091	8	

Source: PBA.ph
Rules for classification: 1) winning percentage; 2) if two teams are tied, head-to-head record; if three or more teams are tied, head-to-head goal average (quotient); 3) overall quotient 4) coin toss

=== Schedule ===
Team ╲ Game	1	2	3	4	5	6	7	8	9	10	11
Alaska	MER	TNT	PHX	BGSM	ROS	SMB	MAG	COL	BWE	NLEX	NP
Barangay Ginebra	COL	ALA	NP	BWE	SMB	PHX	NLEX	MER	ROS	MAG	TNT
Blackwater	TNT	SMB	NP	BGSM	NLEX	MER	ROS	MAG	ALA	COL	PHX
Columbian	MER	PHX	NLEX	BGSM	TNT	SMB	MAG	NP	ALA	ROS	BWE
Magnolia	NLEX	NP	PHX	ROS	SMB	COL	BWE	ALA	MER	TNT	BGSM
Meralco	COL	TNT	ALA	PHX	BWE	BGSM	NP	NLEX	MAG	ROS	SMB
NLEX	TNT	NP	MAG	COL	SMB	BWE	BGSM	PHX	MER	ALA	ROS
NorthPort	NLEX	PHX	MAG	BGSM	BWE	TNT	COL	MER	ROS	SMB	ALA
Phoenix	COL	NP	ALA	TNT	MER	MAG	BGSM	NLEX	SMB	ROS	BWE
Rain or Shine	TNT	MAG	ALA	BWE	BGSM	NP	COL	MER	PHX	SMB	NLEX
San Miguel	NLEX	BWE	COL	BGSM	MAG	ALA	PHX	TNT	NP	ROS	MER
TNT	NLEX	MER	BWE	ALA	PHX	COL	ROS	NP	SMB	MAG	BGSM

= Win; = OT win; = Loss; = OT loss

=== Results ===
Team	ALA	BGSM	BWE	COL	MAG	MER	NLEX	NP	PHX	ROS	SMB	TNT
Alaska		101–109	116–109	104–94	73–83	80–72	110–116*	95–85	108–97	106–89	127–119	125–96
Barangay Ginebra	—		118–124*	96–84	93–86	111–105	106–92	104–98	101–99	97–104	110–102	112–93
Blackwater	—	—		120–99	99–133	94–91	106–124	113–111	91–97	99–93	103–100	104–98*
Columbian	—	—	—		95–113	106–109	104–116	101–118	107–113	100–84	119–143	114–118*
Magnolia	—	—	—	—		88–94	102–72	104–87	82–95	92–76	109–108	116–103
Meralco	—	—	—	—	—		108–105	94–99	86–96	91–82	111–81	90–92
NLEX	—	—	—	—	—	—		123–107	97–123	101–107	112–125	103–90
NorthPort	—	—	—	—	—	—	—		91–132	98–120	107–114	102–104
Phoenix	—	—	—	—	—	—	—	—		103–97	100–117	112–82
Rain or Shine	—	—	—	—	—	—	—	—	—		97–109	104–110
San Miguel	—	—	—	—	—	—	—	—	—	—		107–96
TNT	—	—	—	—	—	—	—	—	—	—	—	

Legend: Blue = left column team win; Red = top row team win.
Matches with lighter background shading were decided after overtime.

== Bracket ==
Quarterfinals
(#1 twice-to-beat)
1	Barangay Ginebra	111
8	NLEX	75
(#4 twice-to-beat)
4	Magnolia	103
5	Blackwater	99
(#2 twice-to-beat)
2	Phoenix	74	103
7	Meralco	90	108*
(#3 twice-to-beat)
3	Alaska	96
6	San Miguel	85

Semifinals (best-of-5)
1	Barangay Ginebra	1
4	Magnolia	3
7	Meralco	1
3	Alaska	3

Finals (best-of-7)
4	Magnolia	4
3	Alaska	2

*Game went into overtime.

== Quarterfinals ==
=== (1) Barangay Ginebra vs. (8) NLEX ===
ESPN 5

November 6
7:00 pm

Box score

Barangay Ginebra San Miguel 111, NLEX Road Warriors 75
Scoring by quarter: 26–20, 24–16, 26–26, 35–13
Pts: Aguilar 18; Rebs: Aguilar, Brownlee 10; Asts: Brownlee 10	Pts: Fuller 25; Rebs: Fuller 12; Asts: Fuller 4
Barangay Ginebra wins series in one game

Smart Araneta Coliseum, Quezon City
Referees: N. Guevarra, R. Gruta, B. Oliva, N. Cortez

=== (2) Phoenix vs. (7) Meralco ===
ESPN 5

November 7
4:30 pm

Box score

Phoenix Fuel Masters 74, Meralco Bolts 90
Scoring by quarter: 17–15, 18–18, 20–33, 19–24
Pts: Phelps 27; Rebs: Phelps 17; Asts: Jazul, Revilla 3	Pts: Durham 26; Rebs: Durham 16; Asts: Amer 6

Cuneta Astrodome, Pasay
Referees: N. Guevarra, R. Yante, M. Orioste, A. Nubla

ESPN 5

November 9
7:00 pm

Box score

Phoenix Fuel Masters 103, Meralco Bolts 108 (OT)
Scoring by quarter: 27–22, 23–18, 18–30, 26–24, Overtime: 9–14
Pts: Perkins 24; Rebs: Phelps 23; Asts: Phelps 7	Pts: Durham 32; Rebs: Durham 21; Asts: Durham 9
Meralco wins series in two games

Smart Araneta Coliseum, Quezon City
Referees: P. Balao, R. Yante, B. Oliva, M. Orioste

=== (3) Alaska vs. (6) San Miguel ===
ESPN 5

November 7
7:00 pm

Box score

Alaska Aces 96, San Miguel Beermen 85
Scoring by quarter: 23–19, 20–23, 21–7, 32–36
Pts: Harris 25; Rebs: Harris 17; Asts: four players 3	Pts: Murphy 19; Rebs: Standhardinger 11; Asts: Ross 7
Alaska wins series in one game

Cuneta Astrodome, Pasay
Referees: P. Balao, B. Oliva, M. Montoya, J. Nicandro

=== (4) Magnolia vs. (5) Blackwater ===
ESPN 5

November 6
4:30 pm

Box score

Magnolia Hotshots Pambansang Manok 103, Blackwater Elite 99
Scoring by quarter: 32–22, 23–25, 21–31, 27–21
Pts: Lee 22; Rebs: Travis 20; Asts: Travis 12	Pts: Walker 18; Rebs: Erram 19; Asts: Pinto, Walker 5
Magnolia wins series in one game

Smart Araneta Coliseum, Quezon City
Referees: P. Balao, R. Yante, M. Montoya, M. Orioste

== Semifinals ==
=== (1) Barangay Ginebra vs. (4) Magnolia ===
ESPN 5

November 10
6:30 pm

Box score

Barangay Ginebra San Miguel 98, Magnolia Hotshots Pambansang Manok 106
Scoring by quarter: 39–31, 16–32, 21–23, 22–20
Pts: Brownlee 37; Rebs: Brownlee 14; Asts: Brownlee 8	Pts: Travis 37; Rebs: Travis 16; Asts: Travis 5

Ynares Center, Antipolo
Referees: P. Balao, R. Yante, M. Orioste, N. Cortes

ESPN 5

November 12
7:00 pm

Box score

Barangay Ginebra San Miguel 97, Magnolia Hotshots Pambansang Manok 101
Scoring by quarter: 18–21, 28–26, 22–28, 29–26
Pts: Brownlee 31; Rebs: Thompson 15; Asts: Brownlee 7	Pts: Travis 25; Rebs: Travis 12; Asts: Barroca, Travis 7

Smart Araneta Coliseum, Quezon City
Referees: N. Quilinguen, E. Tangkion, M. Montoya, J. Nicandro

ESPN 5

November 14
7:00 pm

Box score

Barangay Ginebra San Miguel 107, Magnolia Hotshots Pambansang Manok 103
Scoring by quarter: 23–22, 19–36, 37–23, 28–22
Pts: Brownlee 46; Rebs: Brownlee 19; Asts: four players 5	Pts: Barroca 19; Rebs: Sangalang 11; Asts: Jalalon 8

Smart Araneta Coliseum, Quezon City
Referees: P. Balao, N. Guevarra, B. Oliva, N. Ranido

ESPN 5

November 16
7:00 pm

Box score

Barangay Ginebra San Miguel 108, Magnolia Hotshots Pambansang Manok 112
Scoring by quarter: 27–20, 26–31, 26–30, 29–31
Pts: Brownlee 32; Rebs: Aguilar 14; Asts: Thompson 8	Pts: Travis 50; Rebs: Travis 13; Asts: Sangalang 6
Magnolia wins series, 3–1

Ynares Center, Antipolo
Attendance: 7,400
Referees: N. Quilinguen, E. Tangkion, J. Narandan, J. Borja

=== (3) Alaska vs. (7) Meralco ===
ESPN 5

November 11
6:30 pm

Box score

Alaska Aces 92, Meralco Bolts 97
Scoring by quarter: 17–25, 17–22, 22–25, 36–25
Pts: Harris 37; Rebs: Harris 18; Asts: Banchero 4	Pts: Durham 32; Rebs: Durham 14; Asts: Durham 6

Ynares Center, Antipolo
Referees: N. Quilingen, M. Montoya, J. Narandan, N. Ranido

ESPN 5

November 13
7:00 pm

Box score

Alaska Aces 100, Meralco Bolts 95
Scoring by quarter: 23–21, 24–19, 27–20, 26–35
Pts: Harris 37; Rebs: Harris 19; Asts: Banchero 8	Pts: Durham 24; Rebs: Durham 9 Asts: Durham 12

Mall of Asia Arena, Pasay
Referees: P. Balao, R. Yante, B. Oliva, M. Flordeliza

ESPN 5

November 15
7:00 pm

Box score

Alaska Aces 104, Meralco Bolts 102
Scoring by quarter: 25–22, 22–31, 28–21, 29–28
Pts: Harris 31; Rebs: Harris 24; Asts: Harris 7	Pts: Durham 37; Rebs: Durham 13; Asts: Durham 8

Cuneta Astrodome, Pasay
Referees: N. Guevarra, E. Tangkion, M. Orioste, N. Ranido

ESPN 5

November 17
6:30 pm

Box score

Alaska Aces 99, Meralco Bolts 92
Scoring by quarter: 21–28, 26–20, 21–12, 31–32
Pts: Harris 27; Rebs: Harris 14; Asts: four players 3	Pts: Durham 31; Rebs: Durham 14; Asts: Newsome 7
Alaska wins series, 3–1

Cuneta Astrodome, Pasay

== Finals ==
ESPN 5

December 5
7:00 pm

Box score

Alaska Aces 84, Magnolia Hotshots Pambansang Manok 100

Mall of Asia Arena, Pasay

ESPN 5

December 7
7:00 pm

Box score

Alaska Aces 71, Magnolia Hotshots Pambansang Manok 77

Smart Araneta Coliseum, Quezon City

ESPN 5

December 9
6:30 pm

Box score

Alaska Aces 100, Magnolia Hotshots Pambansang Manok 71

Ynares Center, Antipolo

ESPN 5

December 12
7:00 pm

Box score

Alaska Aces 90, Magnolia Hotshots Pambansang Manok 76

Smart Araneta Coliseum, Quezon City

ESPN 5

December 14
7:00 pm

Box score

Alaska Aces 78, Magnolia Hotshots Pambansang Manok 79

Smart Araneta Coliseum, Quezon City

ESPN 5

December 19
7:00 pm

Box score

Alaska Aces 86, Magnolia Hotshots Pambansang Manok 102
Magnolia wins series, 4–2

Ynares Center, Antipolo

== Imports ==
The following is the list of imports, which had played for their respective teams at least once, with the returning imports in italics. Highlighted are the imports who stayed with their respective teams for the whole conference.

Team	Name	Debuted	Last game	Record
Alaska Aces	(United States) Mike Harris	August 24 (vs. Meralco)	December 19 (vs. Magnolia)	14–8
Barangay Ginebra San Miguel	(United States) Justin Brownlee	August 31 (vs. Columbian)	November 16 (vs. Magnolia)	11–5
Blackwater Elite	(United States) Henry Walker	August 24 (vs. TNT)	November 6 (vs. Magnolia)	7–5
Columbian Dyip	(United States) Akeem Wright	August 17 (vs. Meralco)	October 27 (vs. Blackwater)	1–10
Magnolia Hotshots Pambansang Manok	(North Macedonia) Romeo Travis	August 22 (vs. NLEX)	December 19 (vs. Alaska)	16–6
Meralco Bolts	(United States) Allen Durham	August 17 (vs. Columbian)	November 17 (vs. Alaska)	8–9
NLEX Road Warriors	(Nigeria) Olu Ashaolu	August 17 (vs. TNT)	August 22 (vs. Magnolia)	2–1
NLEX Road Warriors	(United States) Aaron Fuller	August 29 (vs. Columbian)	November 6 (vs. Barangay Ginebra)	3–6
NorthPort Batang Pier	(United States) Rashad Woods	August 19 (vs. NLEX)	October 28 (vs. Alaska)	2–9
Phoenix Fuel Masters	(United States) Eugene Phelps	August 22 (vs. Columbian)	November 9 (vs. Meralco)	8–5
Rain or Shine Elasto Painters	(United States) J'Nathan Bullock	September 22 (vs. TNT)	September 26 (vs. Magnolia)	0–2
Rain or Shine Elasto Painters	(United States) Terrence Watson	October 3 (vs. Alaska)	October 27 (vs. San Miguel)	2–6
Rain or Shine Elasto Painters	No import	November 3 (vs. NLEX)		1–0
San Miguel Beermen	(United States) Arizona Reid	September 1 (vs. NLEX)	September 23 (vs. Barangay Ginebra)	2–2
San Miguel Beermen	(United States) Kevin Murphy	September 30 (vs. Magnolia)	November 7 (vs. Alaska)	4–4
TNT KaTropa	(United States) Mike Glover	August 17 (vs. NLEX)	August 17 (vs. NLEX)	0–1
TNT KaTropa	No import	August 19 (vs. Meralco)		1–0
TNT KaTropa	(United States) Stacy Davis	August 24 (vs. Blackwater)	September 2 (vs. Columbian)	1–3
TNT KaTropa	(United States) Marqus Blakely	September 22 (vs. Rain or Shine)	November 4 (vs. Barangay Ginebra)	2–3

== Awards ==
=== Conference ===
- Best Player of the Conference: Paul Lee (Magnolia Hotshots)
- Best Import of the Conference: Mike Harris (Alaska Aces)
- Finals MVP: Mark Barroca (Magnolia Hotshots)

=== Players of the Week ===
Week	Player	Ref.
August 17–19	Mark Tallo (NLEX Road Warriors)	
August 20–26	Simon Enciso (Alaska Aces)	
August 27 – September 2	Christian Standhardinger (San Miguel Beermen)	
September 17–23	John Pinto (Blackwater Elite)	
September 24–30	Paul Lee (Magnolia Hotshots Pambansang Manok)	
October 1–7	Paul Zamar (Blackwater Elite)	
October 8–14	Jio Jalalon (Magnolia Hotshots Pambansang Manok)	
October 15–21	Chris Banchero (Alaska Aces)	
October 22–28	Christian Standhardinger (San Miguel Beermen)	
October 29 – November 4	Chris Tiu (Rain or Shine Elasto Painters)	
November 5–11	Baser Amer (Meralco Bolts)	
