= 2017 PBA Governors' Cup =

Third conference of the 2016–17 PBA season

- Duration: July 19 – October 27, 2017
- TV partner(s): Local: Sports5; TV5; PBA Rush (HD); International: AksyonTV International

Finals
- Champions: Barangay Ginebra San Miguel
- Runners-up: Meralco Bolts

Awards
- Best Player: Greg Slaughter (Barangay Ginebra San Miguel)
- Best Import: Allen Durham (Meralco Bolts)
- Finals MVP: LA Tenorio (Barangay Ginebra San Miguel)

PBA Governors' Cup chronology
- < 2016 2018 >

PBA conference chronology
- < 2017 Commissioner's 2017–18 Philippine >

The 2017 Philippine Basketball Association (PBA) Governors' Cup, also known as the 2017 Oppo-PBA Governors' Cup for sponsorship reasons, was the third and last conference of the 2016–17 PBA season. The tournament started on July 19 and ended on October 27, 2017. The tournament allowed teams to hire foreign players or imports with a height limit of 6 ft 5 in (1.96 m).

Due to the FIBA Asia Cup, the league decided to temporarily shelve signing up Asian imports.

== Format ==
The tournament format for this conference is as follows:

- Single-round robin eliminations; 11 games per team; Teams are then seeded by basis on win–loss records.
- Top eight teams will advance to the quarterfinals. In case of tie, a playoff game will be held only for the #8 seed.
- Quarterfinals (higher seed with the twice-to-beat advantage):
  - QF1: #1 seed vs #8 seed
  - QF2: #2 seed vs #7 seed
  - QF3: #3 seed vs #6 seed
  - QF4: #4 seed vs #5 seed
- Semifinals (best-of-5 series):
  - SF1: QF1 vs. QF4 winners
  - SF2: QF2 vs. QF3 winners
- Finals (best-of-7 series)
  - Winners of the semifinals

== Elimination round ==
=== Team standings ===
Pos	Team	W	L	PCT	GB	Qualification
1	Meralco Bolts	9	2	.818	—	Twice-to-beat in the quarterfinals
2	TNT KaTropa	8	3	.727 (Note: Head-to-head record: Talk 'N Text 1–0 Barangay Ginebra)	1	Twice-to-beat in the quarterfinals
3	Barangay Ginebra San Miguel	8	3	.727	1	Twice-to-beat in the quarterfinals
4	Star Hotshots	7	4	.636 (Note: Head to-head quotient: Star 1.04, NLEX 1.01, San Miguel 0.99, Rain or Shine 0.96)	2	Twice-to-beat in the quarterfinals
5	NLEX Road Warriors	7	4	.636	2	Twice-to-win in the quarterfinals
6	San Miguel Beermen	7	4	.636	2	Twice-to-win in the quarterfinals
7	Rain or Shine Elasto Painters	7	4	.636	2	Twice-to-win in the quarterfinals
8	Blackwater Elite	5	6	.455	4	Twice-to-win in the quarterfinals
9	Alaska Aces	3	8	.273 (Note: Head-to-head record: Alaska 1–0 GlobalPort)	6	
10	GlobalPort Batang Pier	3	8	.273	6	
11	Phoenix Fuel Masters	2	9	.182	7	
12	Kia Picanto	0	11	.000	9	

Source: PBA.ph

=== Schedule ===
Team ╲ Game	1	2	3	4	5	6	7	8	9	10	11
Alaska Aces	NLEX	PHX	SH	TNT	BWE	BGSM	SMB	GP	KIA	MER	ROS
Barangay Ginebra San Miguel	MER	GP	KIA	NLEX	ALA	PHX	SH	BWE	SMB	ROS	TNT
Blackwater Elite	MER	SH	SMB	PHX	NLEX	ALA	TNT	KIA	BGSM	GP	ROS
GlobalPort Batang Pier	ROS	PHX	BGSM	KIA	SMB	TNT	NLEX	ALA	SH	BWE	MER
Kia Picanto	PHX	NLEX	TNT	BGSM	MER	ROS	GP	BWE	ALA	SMB	SH
Meralco Bolts	BWE	BGSM	ROS	KIA	NLEX	PHX	TNT	SH	ALA	GP	SMB
NLEX Road Warriors	ALA	KIA	ROS	PHX	BGSM	MER	BWE	SMB	GP	TNT	SH
Phoenix Fuel Masters	KIA	ALA	GP	NLEX	BWE	MER	SH	TNT	BGSM	ROS	SMB
Rain or Shine Elasto Painters	GP	NLEX	MER	KIA	TNT	SH	SMB	PHX	BGSM	ALA	BWE
San Miguel Beermen	BWE	TNT	SH	GP	NLEX	ALA	ROS	BGSM	KIA	PHX	MER
Star Hotshots	BWE	ALA	SMB	PHX	ROS	BGSM	MER	GP	TNT	KIA	NLEX
TNT KaTropa	KIA	SMB	ALA	ROS	PHX	BWE	GP	MER	NLEX	SH	BGSM

= Win; = OT win; = Loss; = OT loss

=== Results ===
Team	ALA	BGSM	BWE	GP	KIA	MER	NLEX	PHX	ROS	SMB	SH	TNT
Alaska		80–94	106–111**	101–88	102–94	78–106	104–112	93–95	82–112	90–79	92–101	106–107
Barangay Ginebra	—		98–81	124–108	120–99	78–93	110–97	105–92	89–82	103–107	105–101*	92–121
Blackwater	—	—		118–107	118–97	78–107	107–106	92–86	98–122	93–118	86–103	96–117
GlobalPort	—	—	—		102–90	93–100	99–109	100–91	96–98	112–115	83–109	119–112
Kia	—	—	—	—		97–112	93–100	105–118	86–94	112–118	81–128	96–106
Meralco	—	—	—	—	—		94–100	107–104	89–73	104–101	96–90	107–113
NLEX	—	—	—	—	—	—		95–91	122–114**	103–100	93–101	107–112
Phoenix	—	—	—	—	—	—	—		111–116	107–109	81–100	103–110
Rain or Shine	—	—	—	—	—	—	—	—		96–103	92–88	105–73
San Miguel	—	—	—	—	—	—	—	—	—		98–104	97–91
Star	—	—	—	—	—	—	—	—	—	—		99–104
TNT	—	—	—	—	—	—	—	—	—	—	—	

Legend: Blue = left column team win; Red = top row team win.
Matches with lighter background shading were decided after overtime.

== Bracket ==
Quarterfinals (Top 4 twice-to-beat)
1	Meralco	91	104
8	Blackwater	92	96
4	Star	89
5	NLEX	77
2	TNT	102	118
7	Rain or Shine	106	114
3	Barangay Ginebra	104
6	San Miguel	84

Semifinals (Best-of-5)
1	Meralco	3
4	Star	0
2	TNT	1
3	Barangay Ginebra	3

Finals (Best-of-7)
1	Meralco	3
3	Barangay Ginebra	4

== Quarterfinals ==
=== (1) Meralco vs. (8) Blackwater ===
September 26

Box score

Meralco Bolts 91, Blackwater Elite 92
Scoring by quarter: 17–24, 23–18, 22–21, 29–29
Pts: Newsome 19; Rebs: Durham 21; Asts: Durham 7	Pts: Walker 30; Rebs: Walker 18; Asts: Walker 6

Mall of Asia Arena, Pasay
Referees: J. Mariano, R. Gruta, M. Montoya, J. Nicandro

September 28

Box score

Meralco Bolts 104, Blackwater Elite 96
Scoring by quarter: 22–22, 18–30, 33–25, 31–19
Pts: Amer 31; Rebs: Durham 20; Asts: Durham 9	Pts: Walker 34; Rebs: Walker 16; Asts: Sumang 8
Meralco wins series in two games

Smart Araneta Coliseum, Quezon City
Referees: P. Balao, E. Tangkion, R. Dacanay, M. Orioste

=== (2) TNT vs. (7) Rain or Shine ===
September 27

Box score

TNT KaTropa 102, Rain or Shine Elasto Painters 106
Scoring by quarter: 28–26, 19–26, 28–32, 27–22
Pts: Williams 23; Rebs: Rosario 16; Asts: Castro, Rice Jr. 6	Pts: Bullock 31; Rebs: Bullock 15; Asts: Norwood 6

Mall of Asia Arena, Pasay
Referees: P. Balao, E. Tangkion, J. Narandan, M. Flordeliza

September 29

Box score

TNT KaTropa 118, Rain or Shine Elasto Painters 114
Scoring by quarter: 27–27, 32–32, 26–27, 33–28
Pts: Rice Jr. 34; Rebs: Rice Jr. 16; Asts: Castro 12	Pts: Bullock 30; Rebs: Ahanmisi 12; Asts: Ahanmisi 8
TNT wins series in two games

Smart Araneta Coliseum, Quezon City
Referees: N. Quilinguen, N. Guevarra, M. Montoya, J. Nicandro

=== (3) Barangay Ginebra vs. (6) San Miguel ===
September 27

Box score

Barangay Ginebra San Miguel 104, San Miguel Beermen 84
Scoring by quarter: 23–23, 22–9, 29–29, 30–23
Pts: Brownlee 37; Rebs: Thompson 13; Asts: Tenorio 10	Pts: Watson 30; Rebs: Fajardo 22; Asts: Ross 7
Barangay Ginebra wins series in one game

Mall of Asia Arena, Pasay
Referees: N. Quilinguen, S. Pineda, R. Yante, E. Botecario

=== (4) Star vs. (5) NLEX ===
September 26

Box score

Star Hotshots 89, NLEX Road Warriors 77
Scoring by quarter: 23–22, 22–23, 16–18, 28–14
Pts: Acox 21; Rebs: Acox 12; Asts: Pingris 5	Pts: Fuller 16; Rebs: Fuller 9 Asts: Fonacier 4
Star wins series in one game

Mall of Asia Arena, Pasay
Referees: N. Quilinguen, N. Guevarra, R. Dacanay, M. Orioste

== Semifinals ==
=== (1) Meralco vs. (4) Star ===
October 1

Box score

Meralco Bolts 72, Star Hotshots 66
Scoring by quarter: 7–21, 25–15, 15–17, 25–13
Pts: Durham 23; Rebs: Durham 23; Asts: Dillinger 5	Pts: Jalalon 15; Rebs: Acox 16; Asts: Jalalon, Pingris 3

Alonte Sports Arena, Biñan, Laguna
Referees: J. Mariano, N. Guevarra, J. Narandan, M. Orioste

October 3

Box score

Meralco Bolts 98, Star Hotshots 74
Scoring by quarter: 30–11, 23–21, 25–16, 20–26
Pts: three players 18 each Rebs: Durham 25; Asts: Amer 8	Pts: Barroca 16; Rebs: Acox 12; Asts: Jalalon 3

Sta. Rosa Multi-Purpose Complex, Santa Rosa, Laguna
Referees: P. Balao, S. Pineda, R. Dacanay, M. Montoya

October 5

Box score

Meralco Bolts 91, Star Hotshots 88 (OT)
Scoring by quarter: 30–27, 24–16, 15–25, 14–15, Overtime: 8–5
Pts: Durham 24; Rebs: Durham 19; Asts: Durham 6	Pts: Barroca 21; Rebs: Barroca 12; Asts: Barroca 8
Meralco wins series, 3–0

Smart Araneta Coliseum, Quezon City
Referees: J. Mariano, R. Gruta, R. Yante, J. Narandan

=== (2) TNT vs. (3) Barangay Ginebra ===
October 2

Box score

TNT KaTropa 94, Barangay Ginebra San Miguel 121
Scoring by quarter: 22–31, 26–29, 27–35, 19–26
Pts: Rice Jr. 26; Rebs: Rice Jr. 10; Asts: Castro 7	Pts: Brownlee 21; Rebs: Brownlee, Mariano 8 Asts: Tenorio 7

Smart Araneta Coliseum, Quezon City
Referees: N. Quilinguen, R. Gruta, R. Yante, D. Dacanay

October 4

Box score

TNT KaTropa 103, Barangay Ginebra San Miguel 96
Scoring by quarter: 31–14, 18–33, 27–22, 27–27
Pts: Rice Jr. 21; Rebs: Williams 11; Asts: Castro 10	Pts: Brownlee 25; Rebs: Brownlee 10; Asts: Tenorio 6

Batangas City Coliseum, Batangas City, Batangas
Referees: J. Mariano, E. Tangkion, J. Narandan, M. Flordeliza

October 6

Box score

TNT KaTropa 103, Barangay Ginebra San Miguel 106
Scoring by quarter: 26–31, 23–29, 31–25, 23–21
Pts: Rice Jr. 44; Rebs: Rice Jr. 20; Asts: Castro 9	Pts: Devance 20; Rebs: Brownlee 13; Asts: Tenorio 8

Smart Araneta Coliseum, Quezon City
Referees: P. Balao, N. Guevarra, S. Pineda, M. Orioste

October 8

Box score

TNT KaTropa 105, Barangay Ginebra San Miguel 115
Scoring by quarter: 41–32, 25–20, 20–28, 19–35
Pts: Rosario 28; Rebs: Rosario 10; Asts: Castro 9	Pts: Brownlee 46; Rebs: Brownlee 10; Asts: Tenorio 7
Barangay Ginebra wins series, 3–1

Smart Araneta Coliseum, Quezon City
Referees: N. Quilinguen, P. Balao, R. Gruta, M. Montoya

== Finals ==
ESPN5

October 13
7:00 pm

Box score

Meralco Bolts 87, Barangay Ginebra San Miguel 102

Quezon Convention Center, Lucena, Quezon

ESPN5

October 15
6:30pm

Box score

Meralco Bolts 76, Barangay Ginebra San Miguel 86

Smart Araneta Coliseum, Quezon City

ESPN5

October 18
7:00pm

Box score

Meralco Bolts 94, Barangay Ginebra San Miguel 81

Smart Araneta Coliseum, Quezon City

ESPN5

October 20
7:00pm

Box score

Meralco Bolts 85, Barangay Ginebra San Miguel 83

Smart Araneta Coliseum, Quezon City

ESPN5

October 22
6:30pm

Box score

Meralco Bolts 74, Barangay Ginebra San Miguel 85

Philippine Arena, Bocaue, Bulacan

ESPN5

October 25
7:00pm

Box score

Meralco Bolts 98, Barangay Ginebra San Miguel 91

Philippine Arena, Bocaue, Bulacan

ESPN5

October 27
7:00pm

Box score

Meralco Bolts 96, Barangay Ginebra San Miguel 101
Barangay Ginebra wins series, 4–3

Philippine Arena, Bocaue, Bulacan

== Imports ==
The following is the list of imports, which had played for their respective teams at least once, with the returning imports in italics. Highlighted in gold are the imports who stayed with their respective teams for the whole conference.

Team	Name	Debuted	Last game	Record
Alaska Aces	LaDontae Henton	July 19 (vs. NLEX)	September 20 (vs. Rain or Shine)	3–8
Barangay Ginebra San Miguel	Justin Brownlee	July 23 (vs. Meralco)	October 27 (vs. Meralco)	16–7
Blackwater Elite	Trevis Simpson	July 21 (vs. Meralco)	July 29 (vs. San Miguel)	0–3
Blackwater Elite	Henry Walker	August 6 (vs. Phoenix)	September 28 (vs. Meralco)	6–4
GlobalPort Batang Pier	Jabril Trawick	July 21 (vs. Rain or Shine)	July 21 (vs. Rain or Shine)	0–1
GlobalPort Batang Pier	Murphy Holloway	July 26 (vs. Phoenix)	September 17 (vs. Blackwater)	3–6
GlobalPort Batang Pier	No Import	September 22 (vs. Meralco)		0–1
Kia Picanto	Markeith Cummings	July 19 (vs. Phoenix)	August 20 (vs. GlobalPort)	0–7
Kia Picanto	Geron Johnson	September 1 (vs. Blackwater)	September 22 (vs. Star)	0–4
Meralco Bolts	Allen Durham	July 21 (vs. Blackwater)	October 27 (vs. Baarangay Ginebra)	16–7
NLEX Road Warriors	Aaron Fuller	July 19 (vs. Alaska)	September 26 (vs. Star)	7–5
Phoenix Fuel Masters	Eugene Phelps	July 19 (vs. Kia)	August 6 (vs. Blackwater)	2–3
Phoenix Fuel Masters	Brandon Brown	August 18 (vs. Meralco)	September 20 (vs. San Miguel)	0–6
Rain or Shine Elasto Painters	J.D. Weatherspoon	July 21 (vs. GlobalPort)	July 29 (vs. Meralco)	1–2
Rain or Shine Elasto Painters	J'Nathan Bullock	August 13 (vs. Kia)	September 29 (vs. TNT)	7–3
San Miguel Beermen	Wendell McKines	July 29 (vs. Blackwater)	August 27 (vs. NLEX)	3–2
San Miguel Beermen	Terik Bridgeman	September 2 (vs. Alaska)	September 6 (vs. Rain or Shine)	1–1
San Miguel Beermen	Terrence Watson	September 10 (vs. Barangay Ginebra)	September 27 (vs. Barangay Ginebra)	3–2
Star Hotshots	Cinmeon Bowers	July 23 (vs. Blackwater)	July 23 (vs. Blackwater)	1–0
Star Hotshots	Malcolm Hill	July 28 (vs. Alaska)	September 15 (vs. GlobalPort)	4–3
Star Hotshots	Kristófer Acox	September 17 (vs. TNT)	October 5 (vs. Meralco)	3–4
TNT KaTropa	Michael Craig	July 28 (vs. Kia)	August 4 (vs. Alaska)	2–1
TNT KaTropa	Glen Rice Jr.	August 20 (vs. Rain or Shine)	October 8 (vs. Barangay Ginebra)	8–6

== Awards ==
=== Conference ===
- Best Player of the Conference: Greg Slaughter (Barangay Ginebra San Miguel)
- Bobby Parks Best Import of the Conference: Allen Durham (Meralco Bolts)

=== Players of the Week ===
Week	Player	Ref.
July 19–23	Kevin Alas (NLEX Road Warriors)	
July 24–30	LA Tenorio (Barangay Ginebra San Miguel)	
July 31 – August 6	Joe Devance (Barangay Ginebra San Miguel)	
August 13–20	Chris Tiu (Rain or Shine Elasto Painters)	
August 21–27	Larry Fonacier (NLEX Road Warriors)	
August 28 – September 3	Juami Tiongson (NLEX Road Warriors)	
September 4–10	Chris Ross (San Miguel Beermen)	
September 18–24	Chris Newsome (Meralco Bolts)	
September 25 – October 1	Jared Dillinger (Meralco Bolts)	
October 2–8	Jared Dillinger (Meralco Bolts)	
