= Greg Slaughter =

Filipino-American basketball player

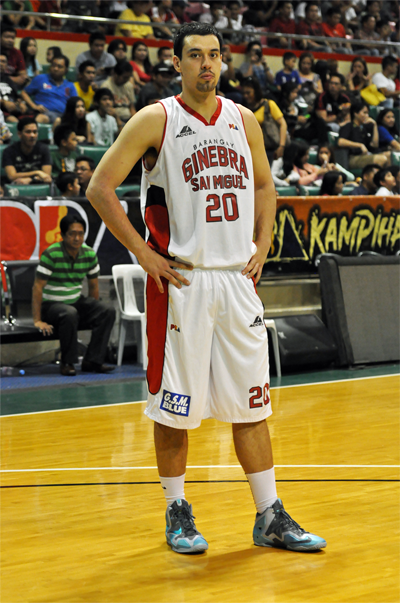
- Slaughter with Barangay Ginebra in 2014

Free agent
- Position: Center

Personal information
- Born: May 19, 1988 (age 38) Cleveland, Ohio, U.S.
- Listed height: 7 ft 0 in (2.13 m)
- Listed weight: 258 lb (117 kg)

Career information
- High school: Massaponax (Fredericksburg, Virginia)
- College: UV (2007–2009); Ateneo (2011–2012)
- PBA draft: 2013: 1st round1st overall
- Drafted by: Barangay Ginebra San Miguel
- Playing career: 2013–present

Career history
- 2013–2020: Barangay Ginebra San Miguel
- 2021: NorthPort Batang Pier
- 2022–2024: Rizing Zephyr Fukuoka
- 2024: Manila SV Batang Sampaloc
- 2025: Basilan Starhorse

Career highlights
- 4× PBA champion (2016 Governors', 2017 Governors', 2018 Commissioner's, 2019 Governors'); PBA Best Player of the Conference (2017 Governors'); 5× PBA All-Star (2014–2016, 2018, 2019); PBA Mythical First Team (2015); PBA Mythical Second Team (2014); PBA Rookie of the Year (2014); PBA All-Rookie Team (2014); All-MPBL Second Team (2024); MPBL All-Star (2024); 2× UAAP champion (2011, 2012); 3× CESAFI champion (2007–2009); 2× CESAFI Most Valuable Player (2008, 2009); 2× UAAP Mythical Team (2011, 2012); 2× PCCL Mythical Team (2011, 2012); Filoil Flying V Preseason Hanes Cup champion (2011); Filoil Flying V Preseason Hanes Cup Flying V Preseason Hanes Cup Mythical Team (2012)

Gregory William Slaughter (born May 19, 1988) is a Filipino-American professional basketball player who last played for the Basilan Starhorse of the Maharlika Pilipinas Basketball League (MPBL). He was selected first overall by the Barangay Ginebra in the 2013 PBA draft. Sports commentators and scribes call him GregZilla because of his apparent heft and height. Listed at 7 ft 0 in (2.13 m) and 245 pounds (111 kg), he plays the center position in B.League, the Japanese professional basketball league.

== Early life ==
Greg's father is 6 ft 3 in (1.91 m), while his mother is 5 ft 7 in (1.70 m), Both of his parents were health physicists at nuclear power plants. He was born in Cleveland, Ohio, and grew up in Virginia, finishing at Massaponax High School. In 2007, his family moved to Cebu, the hometown of his mother. He quickly learned Cebuano and was convinced by his maternal uncles to play competitive basketball.

== College career ==
He studied and played for the University of the Visayas from 2007 to 2009 and took up Political Science, winning the Cebu Schools Athletic Foundation, Inc. (CESAFI) men's basketball title each year in his three-year stint with UV, as well as the league MVP award in 2008 and 2009, the latter of which he shared with June Mar Fajardo of the University of Cebu. He transferred to Ateneo de Manila University in 2010 and became an eligible player in 2011. In his two seasons for the Blue Eagles, he averaged 13.1 PPG, 9.8 RPG, 1.8 APG 2.9 BPG and 49.7 FG%, and he placed second in rebounds and blocks. He successfully teamed up with Kiefer Ravena and Nico Salva to lead Ateneo to two UAAP championships and completing a five-peat.

== PBA D-League ==
After graduating from Ateneo, he signed with PBA D-League team NLEX Road Warriors to showcase his talent for the upcoming PBA Draft.

== Career ==
=== PBA draft ===
Slaughter declared for the 2013 PBA draft. In the prospect camp, he was measured to have height of 6 foot and 11 5/8 inches and a wingspan of 85 inches. He had a vertical reach of 11 feet 6 inches and performed 40 bench presses, the most of all draft applicants. He also did 50 situps, 62 pushups and 18 pullups. After the workout, multiple PBA managers and analysts listed him as the no. 1 prospect. Barangay Ginebra San Miguel picked him with the #1 pick in the draft.

=== Barangay Ginebra San Miguel (2013–2020) ===
Greg Slaughter was paired with Japeth Aguilar to form one of the most formidable frontcourt duos in the PBA and was dubbed the "Twin Towers". In his first game in the PBA, he tallied 10 points (5 of 9 shooting) and 13 rebounds in 36 minutes of play. On February 8, 2020, via Instagram, Slaughter announced that he's taking a break from PBA after his contract with Ginebra already expired.

On February 4, 2021, Ginebra coach Tim Cone confirmed that Slaughter is re-signed with the team after a 1-year hiatus.

=== NorthPort Batang Pier (2021) ===
On March 5, 2021, Slaughter was traded to the NorthPort Batang Pier in exchange for Christian Standhardinger. He became a restricted free agent on January 31, 2022. He was unable to re-sign with NorthPort due to contract disputes.

=== Rizing Zephyr Fukuoka (2022–2024) ===
On July 9, 2022, Slaughter signed with Rizing Zephyr Fukuoka of the B2 League of Japan marking his departure from the PBA.

=== Manila SV Batang Sampaloc (2024) ===
In April 2024, Greg Slaughter was listed as a reserve player for Manila SV Batang Sampaloc of the Maharlika Pilipinas Basketball League (MPBL). He joined the Manila squad upon the conclusion of the 2023–24 B.League season.

=== Basilan Starhorse (2025) ===
In July 2025, Slaughter joined MPBL team Basilan Starhorse. Sumisip mayor and team owner Jhulz Hataman personally recruited Slaughter. He chose Basilan despite offers from his previous team Manila Batang Quiapo and the Cebu Greats.

=== Possible PBA return ===
Slaughter signalled his intention to return to the PBA in October 2025, apologizing to the league management for "past miscommunications". His last contact with the now-defunct NorthPort expired in 2022, but successor franchise Titan Ultra Giant Risers has the re-signing rights to Slaughter among the PBA teams. Titan Ultra has begun negotiating for a contract with Slaughter.

Still a free agent, Slaughter in April 2026 joined the Zamboanga Valientes for the 2026 Asia Pacific Basketball Tournament in Melbourne, Australia.

== National team ==
Slaughter was the starting center for the Sinag Pilipinas team that won the 2011 SEA Games and the 2011 SEABA tournament which was the qualifying tournament for the 2011 FIBA Asia Championship. He was also a part of the national team pool in preparation for the 2013 FIBA Asia Championship held in the Philippines but did not make it to the final 12 roster. He was again invited to the pool that will train to compete in both the 2014 FIBA Basketball World Cup in Spain and the 2014 Asian Games in Incheon, South Korea, but he declined. He played in the Philippines in the fifth window of the Asia qualifiers for the 2019 FIBA World Cup against Kazakhstan, but he was scoreless and had only one rebound in the game.

== Personal life ==
Greg Slaughter married his longtime girlfriend Schinina Juban on December 10, 2020. He has three daughters.

== PBA career statistics ==
Legend
GP	Games played	MPG	Minutes per game
FG%	Field-goal percentage	3P%	3-point field-goal percentage	FT%	Free-throw percentage
RPG	Rebounds per game	APG	Assists per game	SPG	Steals per game
BPG	Blocks per game	PPG	Points per game	**Bold**	Career high

As of the end of 2021 Season

=== Season-by-season averages ===
Year	Team	GP	MPG	FG%	3P%	FT%	RPG	APG	SPG	BPG	PPG
2013–14	Barangay Ginebra	43	32.9	.532	.000	.641	10.0	1.5	.2	1.4	14.6
2014–15	Barangay Ginebra	32	28.8	.494	—	.705	10.3	1.3	.2	.8	14.8
2015–16	Barangay Ginebra	26	**35.3**	**.545**	.000	.708	**11.7**	**2.0**	**.4**	1.3	**19.7**
2016–17	Barangay Ginebra	23	27.4	.487	—	.659	8.2	1.4	.2	**1.9**	13.8
2017–18	Barangay Ginebra	38	27.7	.486	.000	.691	8.0	1.9	.3	1.1	13.4
2019	Barangay Ginebra	**49**	22.8	.508	—	**.713**	6.4	1.0	.3	.9	9.8
2021	NorthPort	12	**35.3**	.480	**.059**	.563	10.8	.7	.3	**1.9**	16.5
Career		223	29.0	.508	.048	.678	9.0	1.4	.3	1.2	14.0
