= Grace Christian University =

Private university in Michigan, U.S.

- Former names: Milwaukee Bible Institute; Milwaukee Bible College; Grace Bible College
- Type: Private university
- Established: 1945
- Religious affiliation: Evangelical Christian (Grace Gospel Fellowship)
- Endowment: $400,000
- President: Ken Kemper
- Faculty: 28
- Students: 900+
- Location: Grand Rapids, Michigan, United States; 42°55′10″N 85°41′32″W
- Campus: 23 acres (9.3 ha); Suburban
- Colors: Light Blue and Black
- Sporting affiliations: NCCAA, ACCA
- Mascot: Tigers
- Website: gracechristian.edu

Grace Christian University, known from 1961 to 2018 as Grace Bible College, is a private Christian university in Grand Rapids, Michigan, United States. It is accredited by the Higher Learning Commission and the Association for Biblical Higher Education to award associate, baccalaureate, and graduate degrees. The university is affiliated with the Grace Gospel Fellowship.

== History ==
Grace Christian University began in 1939 as an evening Bible institute led by Charles F. Baker. It was an outgrowth of the late 19th-century Bible college movement. Initially, its main purpose was to train Sunday School teachers and church members in Baker's Fundamental Bible Church in Milwaukee, Wisconsin. In 1945, the program expanded to a day school called Milwaukee Bible Institute.

The college's historical theological perspective is "Mid-Acts Dispensationalism," which came together under J. C. O'Hair and other early "Grace" teachers in the mid-20th century. Its key views are 1) the church of the current dispensation, the Body of Christ, did not begin until the middle portion of the book of Acts (Acts 9 or 13), not in Acts 2, as is more commonly held among dispensationalists; 2) within the entire Bible, the Apostle Paul's epistles are a unique revelation of the "mystery," namely, that Gentiles are now "joint-heirs" with Jews in receiving God's salvation by faith in Christ alone and its subsequent blessings in the Body of Christ; 3) accordingly, the four Gospels and through at least Acts 8 are not "to" Christians today, though they are "for" them and should be read to understand the "Kingdom" teachings of Jesus and to apply them in light of Paul's distinct teachings to the Body of Christ. One implication of these views is that water baptism is a Kingdom distinctive that does not apply to the Body of Christ so it should not be not practiced by Christians today. Some "Grace believers" also regard the General Epistles to contain teachings that only apply to the Kingdom dispensation, such as, works for salvation, though this view is not universal in the "Grace movement." Students do not need to believe these "Grace distinctives" to attend, and some consider these distinctives to be waning in light of the need to attract students and other constituents outside the Grace movement to maintain enrollment and institutional viability.

In 1953 the school was renamed Milwaukee Bible College and curricular options were added. In 1961, the college moved from Milwaukee, Wisconsin to Wyoming, Michigan, a suburb of Grand Rapids. Its name was changed to Grace Bible College. Grace was granted authority from the State of Michigan to give Associate and Bachelor of Religious Education degrees, as well as a five-year degree for vocational ministers.

In 1967, Grace was accreditation by the Association of American Biblical Colleges, now the Association of Biblical Higher Education. Since then, the degree programs have expanded to include Associate of Arts degrees, Bachelor of Science degrees and Master of Arts degrees.

In 2010, Grace began offering online education, allowing students to continue with their education exclusively online.

In 2017, the college’s name was officially changed from Grace Bible College to Grace Christian University by a unanimous vote of the Board of Directors. Officially, the change took place on July 1, 2018.

Grace Christian University incorporates the study of the Bible as a core value in every degree program.

Successive presidents of Grace have been Jack T. Dean, Samuel Vinton, Jr., Bruce Kemper, and Ken B. Kemper, who is the current president.

== Academics ==
Today, the university has programs across numerous majors such as business, education, exercise science, history, human services, and others. Its most popular majors, by 2021 graduates, were:

- Lay Ministry (28)
- Human Services (25)
- Psychology (12)
- Business/Commerce (11)
- Bible/Biblical Studies (10)

Grace Christian University offers a variety of degrees both on campus and online. Each degree at Grace integrates a biblical focus, with required Bible credits. Students have the opportunity to earn associate, bachelor, or master's degrees.
