= 2012–13 Alaska Aces season =

- Head coach: Luigi Trillo
- General Manager: Dickie Bachmann
- Owner(s): Alaska Milk Corporation

Philippine Cup results
- Record: 8–6 (57.1%)
- Place: 5th
- Playoff finish: Semifinalist (def by. Talk 'N Text, 4–2)

Commissioner's Cup results
- Record: 10–3 (76.9%)
- Place: 1st
- Playoff finish: Champions (def. Barangay Ginebra, 3–0)

Governors' Cup results
- Record: 4–5 (44.4%)
- Place: 7th
- Playoff finish: Quarterfinalist (def. by San Mig Coffee in two games)

Alaska Aces seasons

The 2012–13 Alaska Aces season was the 27th season of the franchise in the Philippine Basketball Association (PBA).

== Key dates ==
- August 19: The 2012 PBA Draft took place in Robinson's Midtown Mall, Manila.
- October 17: Calvin Abueva formally signed a contract with the Aces after his commitments with the San Sebastian Stags are finished following their elimination in the NCAA Final Four.

== Draft picks ==
Round	Pick	Player	Position	Nationality	College
1	2	Calvin Abueva	F	Philippines	San Sebastian
2	9	Raphy Reyes	G	Philippines	East
3	2	Karl Dehesa	G/F	United States	Waldorf

== Roster ==
2012–13 Alaska Aces roster
Players
Coaches

Pos.	#	POB	Name	Height	Weight	DOB (YYYY–MM–DD)	From
C	1	(Philippines)	Samigue Eman	6 ft 10 in (2.08 m)	239 lb (108 kg)		Mindanao
G/F	3	(Philippines)	Cyrus Baguio	6 ft 2 in (1.88 m)	180 lb (82 kg)		UST
C	7	(Papua New Guinea)	Sonny Thoss	6 ft 7 in (2.01 m)	205 lb (93 kg)		James Cook
G/F	8	(Philippines)	Calvin Abueva (R)	6 ft 2 in (1.88 m)	190 lb (86 kg)		San Sebastian
F/C	17	(Philippines)	Aldrech Ramos (R)	6 ft 7 in (2.01 m)	198 lb (90 kg)		Far Eastern
G	25	(Philippines)	Dondon Hontiveros	6 ft 2 in (1.88 m)	170 lb (77 kg)		Cebu
F	27	(Philippines)	Gabby Espinas	6 ft 5 in (1.96 m)	194 lb (88 kg)		Philippine Christian
G	31	(Philippines)	RJ Jazul	5 ft 10 in (1.78 m)	170 lb (77 kg)		Letran
G/F	35	(United States)	Tony dela Cruz (C)	6 ft 4 in (1.93 m)	178 lb (81 kg)		UC Irvine
G	42	(Philippines)	JVee Casio	5 ft 9 in (1.75 m)	170 lb (77 kg)		De La Salle

Head coach

- (Philippines) Luigi Trillo (De La Salle)

Assistant coach(es)

- (United States) Alex Compton (Cornell)
- (Philippines) Louie Alas (Adamson)
- (Philippines) Topex Robinson (San Sebastian)

Team manager

- (Philippines) Joaqui Trillo

Legend

- (C) Team captain
- (CI) Commissioner's Cup Import
- (GI) Governors' Cup Import
- (EI) EASL Import
- (DP) Unsigned draft pick
- (FA) Free agent
- (IN) Inactive
- (S) Suspended
- (R) Rookie
- Injured

Roster

Note: Flags indicate national team eligibility at FIBA-sanctioned events. Players may hold other non-FIBA nationalities not displayed.

== Philippine Cup ==
=== Eliminations ===
==== Standings ====
Pos	Team	W	L	PCT	GB	Qualification
1	Talk 'N Text Tropang Texters	12	2	.857	—	Twice-to-beat in the quarterfinals
2	San Mig Coffee Mixers	10	4	.714	2	Twice-to-beat in the quarterfinals
3	Rain or Shine Elasto Painters	9	5	.643	3	Best-of-three quarterfinals
4	Meralco Bolts	8	6	.571 (Note: Head-to-head record: Alaska 1–1 Meralco (Meralco +4))	4	Best-of-three quarterfinals
5	Alaska Aces	8	6	.571	4	Best-of-three quarterfinals
6	Barangay Ginebra San Miguel	7	7	.500	5	Best-of-three quarterfinals
7	Petron Blaze Boosters	6	8	.429	6	Twice-to-win in the quarterfinals
8	Air21 Express	5	9	.357	7	Twice-to-win in the quarterfinals
9	Barako Bull Energy Cola	4	10	.286	8	
10	GlobalPort Batang Pier	1	13	.071	11	

Source: PBA.ph

==== Game log ====
2013 PBA Philippine Cup game log
October

Game	Date	Opponent	Score	High points	High rebounds	High assists	Location Attendance	Record	
1	October 5	San Mig Coffee	83–103	Hontiveros (14)	dela Cruz (7)	Baguio, Casio (3)	Smart Araneta Coliseum	0–1	Boxscores
2	October 10	Meralco	86–93	Baguio (19)	Thoss (11)	Casio (5)	Smart Araneta Coliseum	0–2	Boxscores
3	October 14	Barako Bull	102–86	Casio (24)	Baguio (7)	Casio, Baguio (4)	Smart Araneta Coliseum	1–2	Boxscores
4	October 19	Petron Blaze	88–86	Baguio (21)	Abueva (16)	Casio (6)	Smart Araneta Coliseum	2–2	Boxscores
5	October 26	Air21	92–81	Casio (19)	Abueva (12)	Casio (5)	Smart Araneta Coliseum	3–2	Boxscores
6	October 28	Barangay Ginebra	87–69	Abueva (19)	Abueva (9)	Casio, Baguio (4)	Smart Araneta Coliseum	4–2	Boxscores

November

Game	Date	Opponent	Score	High points	High rebounds	High assists	Location Attendance	Record	
7	November 2	Talk 'N Text	94–92	Casio (25)	Hontiveros (9)	Thoss, Casio, Abueva (4)	Smart Araneta Coliseum	5–2	Boxscore
8	November 7	Rain or Shine	93–101	Baguio, Casio (16)	Thoss (7)	Baracael, Thoss (4)	Smart Araneta Coliseum	5–3	Boxscore
9	November 10	San Mig Coffee	68–77	Baguio (19)	Baguio (8)	Baguio (4)	Lapu-Lapu City	5–4	Boxscore
10	November 14	Air21	103–104	Baracael (24)	Abueva (10)	Thoss (4)	Smart Araneta Coliseum	5–5	Boxscore
11	November 18	Barangay Ginebra	93–96	Baracael (21)	Thoss (8)	Casio (6)	Smart Araneta Coliseum	5–6	Boxscore
12	November 28	Meralco	88–85	Abueva (20)	Abueva (18)	Abueva, Baracael, Baguio, Casio (3)	Smart Araneta Coliseum	6–6	Boxscore

December

Game	Date	Opponent	Score	High points	High rebounds	High assists	Location Attendance	Record	
13	December 1	GlobalPort	101–95	Abueva (21)	Abueva (12)	Casio (5)	Dipolog	7–6	Boxscore
14	December 5	Petron Blaze	79–71	Baguio (20)	Abueva (9)	Casio (6)	Smart Araneta Coliseum	8–6	Boxscore

2012–13 schedule

=== Playoffs ===
==== Bracket ====
Quarterfinals
(#1 twice-to-beat)
1	Talk 'N Text	105
8	Air21	100
(best-of-3)
4	Meralco	0
5	Alaska	2
(#2 twice-to-beat)
2	San Mig Coffee	92*
7	Petron Blaze	87
(best-of-3)
3	Rain or Shine	2
6	Barangay Ginebra	1

Semifinals (best-of-7)
1	Talk 'N Text	4
5	Alaska	2
2	San Mig Coffee	2
3	Rain or Shine	4

Finals (best-of-7)
1	Talk 'N Text	4
3	Rain or Shine	0

*Game went into overtime

==== Game log ====
2013 PBA Philippine Cup playoffs game log
Quarterfinals: 2–0

Game	Date	Opponent	Score	High points	High rebounds	High assists	Location Attendance	Series	
1	December 12	Meralco	90–84	Baguio (26)	Baguio, 2 others (8)	Casio (7)	Smart Araneta Coliseum	1–0	Boxscore
2	December 14	Meralco	88–70	Abueva, Baguio (18)	Abueva, dela Cruz (12)	Casio (8)	Smart Araneta Coliseum	2–0	Boxscore

Semifinals: 2–4

Game	Date	Opponent	Score	High points	High rebounds	High assists	Location Attendance	Series	
1	December 19	Talk 'N Text	65–66	Thoss (14)	Abueva (17)	Baguio, Espinas (3)	Smart Araneta Coliseum	0–1	Boxscore
2	December 21	Talk 'N Text	100–88	Casio (22)	Abueva (14)	Hontiveros (4)	Mall of Asia Arena	1–1	Boxscore
3	December 26	Talk 'N Text	79–93	Thoss (17)	Thoss (14)	Jazul (3)	Mall of Asia Arena	1–2	Boxscore
4	December 28	Talk 'N Text	104–99	Casio (22)	Abueva (11)	Casio (5)	Mall of Asia Arena	2–2	Boxscore
5	December 30	Talk 'N Text	95–99	Abueva (19)	Abueva (11)	Baguio (5)	Mall of Asia Arena	2–3	Boxscore
6	January 4	Talk 'N Text	78–83	Abueva (23)	Abueva (13)	Casio (7)	Cuneta Astrodome	2–4	Boxscore

2012–13 schedule

== Commissioner's Cup ==
=== Eliminations ===
==== Standings ====
Pos	Team	W	L	PCT	GB	Qualification
1	Alaska Aces	11	3	.786	—	Twice-to-beat in the quarterfinals
2	Rain or Shine Elasto Painters	9	5	.643	2	Twice-to-beat in the quarterfinals
3	Petron Blaze Boosters	8	6	.571 (Note: Head-to-head record: Petron 2–0 San Mig)	3	Best-of-three quarterfinals
4	San Mig Coffee Mixers	8	6	.571	3	Best-of-three quarterfinals
5	Meralco Bolts	7	7	.500 (Note: Head-to-head quotient: Meralco 1.01, TNT 1.00, Barangay Ginebra 0.99)	4	Best-of-three quarterfinals
6	Talk 'N Text Tropang Texters	7	7	.500	4	Best-of-three quarterfinals
7	Barangay Ginebra San Miguel	7	7	.500	4	Twice-to-win in the quarterfinals
8	Air21 Express	6	8	.429	5	Twice-to-win in the quarterfinals
9	Barako Bull Energy Cola	5	9	.357	6	
10	GlobalPort Batang Pier	2	12	.143	9	

Source: PBA.ph

==== Game log ====
2013 PBA Commissioner's Cup game log
February

Game	Date	Opponent	Score	High points	High rebounds	High assists	Location Attendance	Record	
1	February 9	Rain or Shine	83–81	Dozier (21)	Dozier (16)	Casio (5)	Smart Araneta Coliseum	1–0	boxscore
2	February 13	Meralco	85–81	Dozier (27)	Dozier (14)	Casio (4)	Smart Araneta Coliseum	2–0	boxscore
3	February 17	Barako Bull	77–73	Dozier (19)	Dozier (20)	Abueva, Thoss, Casio (3)	Smart Araneta Coliseum	3–0	boxscore
4	February 23	Barangay Ginebra	84–69	Dozier (21)	Dozier (11)	Casio (7)	Tubod, Lanao del Norte	4–0	boxscore

March

Game	Date	Opponent	Score	High points	High rebounds	High assists	Location Attendance	Record	
5	March 1	Talk 'N Text	92–69	Dozier (23)	Dozier (18)	Casio (6)	Smart Araneta Coliseum	5–0	boxscore
6	March 6	San Mig Coffee	75–68	Dozier (16)	Dozier (18)	Hontiveros (3)	Smart Araneta Coliseum	5–1	boxscore
7	March 8	Petron Blaze	83–73	Dozier (18)	Dozier (26)	Hontiveros (4)	Smart Araneta Coliseum	6–1	boxscore
8	March 15	Air21	74–68	Dozier (17)	Dozier, Abueva (12)	Baguio (4)	Smart Araneta Coliseum	6–2	boxscore
9	March 17	GlobalPort	93–85	Dozier (26)	Dozier (18)	five players (2)	Smart Araneta Coliseum	7–2	boxscore
10	March 23	San Mig Coffee	83–84	Abueva (27)	Dozier (20)	Abueva, Hontiveros (4)	Smart Araneta Coliseum	7–3	boxscore
11	March 27	Petron Blaze	92–84	Dozier (26)	Dozier (18)	Baguio (6)	Smart Araneta Coliseum	8–3	boxscore

April

Game	Date	Opponent	Score	High points	High rebounds	High assists	Location Attendance	Record	
12	April 5	Rain or Shine	89–84	Dozier (23)	Abueva (13)	Casio (6)	Smart Araneta Coliseum	9–3	boxscore
13	April 10	Barangay Ginebra	102–93	Dozier (28)	Dozier (20)	Casio (8)	Smart Araneta Coliseum	10–3	boxscore
14	April 12	GlobalPort	93–92	Dozier (18)	Abueva (14)	Casio (11)	Smart Araneta Coliseum	11–3	

2012–13 schedule

=== Playoffs ===
==== Bracket ====
Quarterfinals
(#1 twice-to-beat)
1	Alaska	87
8	Air21	81
(best-of-3)
4	San Mig Coffee	2
5	Meralco	1
(#2 twice-to-beat)
2	Rain or Shine	83	79
7	Barangay Ginebra	90	81
(best-of-3)
3	Petron	0
6	Talk 'N Text	2

Semifinals (best-of-5)
1	Alaska	3
4	San Mig Coffee	1
7	Barangay Ginebra	3
6	Talk 'N Text	2

Finals (best-of-5)
1	Alaska	3
7	Barangay Ginebra	0

==== Game log ====
2013 PBA Commissioner's Cup playoffs game log
Quarterfinals: 2–0

Game	Date	Opponent	Score	High points	High rebounds	High assists	Location Attendance	Series	
1	April 20	Air21	90–84	Casio (19)	Dozier (22)	Baguio (6)	Mall of Asia Arena	1–0	Boxscore

Semifinals: 3–1

Game	Date	Opponent	Score	High points	High rebounds	High assists	Location Attendance	Series	
1	April 27	San Mig Coffee	69–71	Dozier (21)	Dozier (15)	Dozier, Abueva, Thoss (4)	Smart Araneta Coliseum	0–1	Boxscore
2	April 29	San Mig Coffee	86–67	Dozier (28)	Dozier (27)	Casio (4)	Mall of Asia Arena	1–1	Boxscore
3	May 8	San Mig Coffee	89–82	Abueva (24)	Dozier (19)	Baguio, Casio (4)	Smart Araneta Coliseum	2–1	Boxscore
4	May 11	San Mig Coffee	83–78	Baguio (16)	Dozier (14)	Thoss (4)	Smart Araneta Coliseum	3–1	Boxscore

Finals: 3–0

Game	Date	Opponent	Score	High points	High rebounds	High assists	Location Attendance	Series	
1	May 15	Barangay Ginebra	87–70	Jazul (16)	Dozier (22)	Baguio, Casio (5)	Smart Araneta Coliseum	1–0	Boxscore
2	May 17	Barangay Ginebra	104–90	Thoss (16)	Dozier (20)		Mall of Asia Arena	2–0	Recap
3	May 19	Barangay Ginebra	104–80	Dozier (27)	Dozier (20)	Dozier (7)	Smart Araneta Coliseum	3–0	Recap

2012–13 schedule

== Governors' Cup ==
=== Eliminations ===
==== Standings ====
Pos	Team	W	L	PCT	GB	Qualification
1	Petron Blaze Boosters	8	1	.889	—	Twice-to-beat in the quarterfinals
2	San Mig Coffee Mixers	6	3	.667	2	Twice-to-beat in the quarterfinals
3	Meralco Bolts	5	4	.556 (Note: Head-to-head record: Meralco 1–0 Rain or Shine)	3	Twice-to-beat in the quarterfinals
4	Rain or Shine Elasto Painters	5	4	.556	3	Twice-to-beat in the quarterfinals
5	GlobalPort Batang Pier	4	5	.444 (Note: Head-to-head quotient: GlobalPort 1.01, Barako Bull 1.00, Alaska 0.99)	4	Twice-to-win in the quarterfinals
6	Barako Bull Energy	4	5	.444	4	Twice-to-win in the quarterfinals
7	Alaska Aces	4	5	.444	4	Twice-to-win in the quarterfinals
8	Barangay Ginebra San Miguel	3	6	.333 (Note: Head-to-head quotient: Talk 'N Text 1.05, Barangay Ginebra 1.00, Air21 0.96; eighth seed playoff: Barangay Ginebra 110–102 Talk 'N Text)	5	Twice-to-win in the quarterfinals
9	Talk 'N Text Tropang Texters	3	6	.333	5	
10	Air21 Express	3	6	.333	5	

Source: PBA.ph

==== Game log ====
2013 PBA Governors' Cup game log
August

Game	Date	Opponent	Score	High points	High rebounds	High assists	Location Attendance	Record	
1	August 23	GlobalPort	88–91	McKines (28)	McKines (13)	Casio (5)	Smart Araneta Coliseum	0–1	Boxscore; Recap
2	August 28	Rain or Shine	94–79	McKines (30)	McKines, Abueva (13)	Thoss (7)	Mall of Asia Arena	1–1	Boxscore

September

Game	Date	Opponent	Score	High points	High rebounds	High assists	Location Attendance	Record	
3	September 1	Barangay Ginebra San Miguel	102–99	McKines (27)	McKines (16)	McKines, Abueva, Baguio (5)	Mall of Asia Arena	2–1	Boxscore
4	September 3	Meralco	74–84	McKines (13)	McKines (10)	Baguio (5)	Smart Araneta Coliseum	2–2	Boxscore
5	September 6	Talk 'N Text	112–104	McKines (38)	McKines (16)	Jazul (4)	Mall of Asia Arena	3–2	Boxscore
6	September 10	San Mig Coffee	82–95	McKines (32)	McKines (15)	Abueva (4)	Smart Araneta Coliseum	3–3	Boxscore
7	September 13	Petron	100–103	McKines (33)	McKines (10)	Abueva, Baguio, Casio (5)	PhilSports Arena	3–4	Boxscore
8	September 18	Barako Bull	91–89	McKines (21)	McKines (15)	McKines (4)	Cuneta Astrodome	4–4	Recap
9	September 22	Air 21	107–121	McKines (43)	McKines (16)	Thoss (6)	Mall of Asia Arena	4–5	Boxscore

2012–13 schedule

==== Game log ====
2013 PBA Governors' Cup playoffs game log
Quarterfinals: 1–1

Game	Date	Opponent	Score	High points	High rebounds	High assists	Location Attendance	Series	
1	September 25	San Mig Coffee	112–105	McKines (38)	McKines (13)	Casio (7)	Smart Araneta Coliseum	1–0	Boxscore
2	September 27	San Mig Coffee	73–83	McKines (24)	McKines (20)	McKines, Casio (5)	Mall of Asia Arena	1–1	Boxscore

2012–13 schedule

== Transactions ==
=== Trades ===
==== Pre-season ====
August 31, 2012	To Alaska JV Casio; 2015 2nd round pick	To Barangay Ginebra L.A. Tenorio
August 31, 2012	To Alaska Dondon Hontiveros	To Petron Blaze Wesley Gonzales; Hans Thiele
September 20, 2012	To Alaska 2015 2nd round pick	To Air21 Bonbon Custodio

==== Commissioner's Cup ====
January 22, 2013	To Alaska Aldrech Ramos	To Barako Bull Mac Baracael

=== Recruited imports ===
Tournament	Name	Debuted	Last game	Record
Commissioner's Cup	Robert Dozier	February 9 (vs. Rain or Shine)	May 19 (vs.Barangay Ginebra San Miguel)	18–4
Governors' Cup	Wendell McKines	August 23 (vs. GlobalPort)	September 27 (vs. San Mig Coffee)	5–6
