= 2015–16 Alaska Aces season =

- Head coach: Alex Compton
- General manager: Dickie Bachmann
- Owner: Alaska Milk Corporation

Philippine Cup results
- Record: 9–2 (81.8%)
- Place: 1st
- Playoff finish: Runner-up (lost to San Miguel, 3–4)

Commissioner's Cup results
- Record: 7–4 (63.6%)
- Place: 3rd
- Playoff finish: Runner-up (lost to Rain or Shine, 2–4)

Governors' Cup results
- Record: 6–5 (54.5%)
- Place: 6th
- Playoff finish: Quarterfinalist (lost to Barangay Ginebra in one game)

Alaska Aces seasons

The 2015–16 Alaska Aces season was the 30th season of the franchise in the Philippine Basketball Association (PBA).

== Key dates ==
=== 2015 ===
- August 23: The 2015 PBA draft took place in Midtown Atrium, Robinson Place Manila.

== Draft picks ==
Round	Pick	Player	Position	Nationality	PBA D-League team	College
1	11	Kevin Racal	SF	Philippines	Hog's Breath Cafe Razorbacks	Letran
2	18	Marion Magat	C	Philippines	Jumbo Plastic Linoleum Giants	NU
2	20	Jaypee Mendoza	SF	Philippines	Hapee Fresh Fighters	San Beda
2	22	Abel Galliguez	PG	United States	Cagayan Valley Rising Suns	John Brown
3	33	Nico Elorde	PG	Philippines	Hapee Fresh Fighters	ADMU
4	42	Robin Roño	PG	Philippines	Tanduay Light Rhum Masters	NU

== Roster ==
2015–16 Alaska Aces roster
Players
Coaches

Pos.	#	POB	Name	Height	Weight	DOB (YYYY–MM–DD)	From
G	2	(United States)	Chris Banchero	6 ft 0 in (1.83 m)	175 lb (79 kg)	1989–01–24	Seattle Pacific
F	4	(Philippines)	Vic Manuel	6 ft 4 in (1.93 m)	201 lb (91 kg)	1987–06–18	PSBA
C	7	(Papua New Guinea)	Sonny Thoss	6 ft 7 in (2.01 m)	205 lb (93 kg)	1981–12–07	James Cook
F	8	(Philippines)	Calvin Abueva	6 ft 2 in (1.88 m)	185 lb (84 kg)	1988–02–04	San Sebastian
F/C	9	(Philippines)	Nonoy Baclao	6 ft 5 in (1.96 m)	190 lb (86 kg)	1987–06–15	Ateneo
F/C	10	(Philippines)	Marion Magat	6 ft 7 in (2.01 m)	180 lb (82 kg)	1989–10–22	National-U
F	11	(United States)	Rome dela Rosa	6 ft 3 in (1.91 m)	185 lb (84 kg)	1990–12–11	San Beda
G	17	(Philippines)	Chris Exciminiano	6 ft 0 in (1.83 m)	185 lb (84 kg)	1988–11–17	Far Eastern
F	18	(Philippines)	Jaypee Mendoza (IN)	6 ft 3 in (1.91 m)	188 lb (85 kg)	1990–11–06	San Beda
G/F	21	(United States)	Josh Vanlandingham (IN)	6 ft 4 in (1.93 m)	205 lb (93 kg)	1984–01–22	Pacific Lutheran
G	23	(United States)	Abel Galliguez (IN)	5 ft 9 in (1.75 m)	175 lb (79 kg)	1990–04–14	John Brown
G/F	25	(Philippines)	Dondon Hontiveros	6 ft 3 in (1.91 m)	180 lb (82 kg)	1977-06-01	Cebu
C	26	(Philippines)	Samigue Eman (IN)	6 ft 9 in (2.06 m)	239 lb (108 kg)	1982–03–12	Mindanao
F/C	30	(United States)	Eric Menk	6 ft 6 in (1.98 m)	220 lb (100 kg)	1974–08–24	Lake Superior State
G	31	(Philippines)	R.J. Jazul	5 ft 11 in (1.80 m)	170 lb (77 kg)	1986–04–11	Letran
F	35	(United States)	Tony dela Cruz (C)	6 ft 5 in (1.96 m)	209 lb (95 kg)	1978–08–24	UC Irvine
G	42	(Philippines)	JVee Casio	5 ft 10 in (1.78 m)	175 lb (79 kg)	1986–09–01	De La Salle
F	61	(Philippines)	Kevin Racal	6 ft 3 in (1.91 m)	175 lb (79 kg)	1991–05–16	Letran

Head coach

- (Philippines) Alex Compton

Assistant coach(es)

- (Philippines) Louie Alas (1st Assistant)
- (Philippines) Topex Robinson
- (United States) Jeffrey Cariaso
- (Philippines) Monch Gavieres
- (Philippines) Franco Atienza

Team manager

- (Philippines) Richard Bachmann^{[a]}

Legend

- (C) Team captain
- (CI) Commissioner's Cup Import
- (GI) Governors' Cup Import
- (EI) EASL Import
- (DP) Unsigned draft pick
- (FA) Free agent
- (IN) Inactive
- (S) Suspended
- (R) Rookie
- Injured

Roster

- ^{a} also serves as Alaska's board governor.

== Philippine Cup ==
=== Eliminations ===
==== Standings ====
Pos	Team	W	L	PCT	GB	Qualification
1	Alaska Aces	9	2	.818 (Note: Head-to-head record: Alaska 1–0 San Miguel)	—	Advance to semifinals
2	San Miguel Beermen	9	2	.818	—	Advance to semifinals
3	Rain or Shine Elasto Painters	8	3	.727	1	Twice-to-beat in the quarterfinals
4	Barangay Ginebra San Miguel	7	4	.636 (Note: Head-to-head record: Barangay Ginebra 1–0 GlobalPort)	2	Twice-to-beat in the quarterfinals
5	GlobalPort Batang Pier	7	4	.636	2	Twice-to-beat in the quarterfinals
6	TNT Tropang Texters	6	5	.545	3	Twice-to-beat in the quarterfinals
7	NLEX Road Warriors	5	6	.455 (Note: Head-to-head record: NLEX 1–0 Barako Bull)	4	Twice-to-win in the quarterfinals
8	Barako Bull Energy	5	6	.455	4	Twice-to-win in the quarterfinals
9	Star Hotshots	4	7	.364	5	Twice-to-win in the quarterfinals
10	Blackwater Elite	3	8	.273	6	Twice-to-win in the quarterfinals
11	Mahindra Enforcer	2	9	.182	7	
12	Meralco Bolts	1	10	.091	8	

Source: PBA.ph

=== Playoffs ===
==== Bracket ====
Quarterfinals (1st phase) (Higher seeds twice-to-beat)
3	Rain or Shine	95
10	Blackwater	90
6	TNT	90
7	NLEX	88
4	Barangay Ginebra	92*
9	Star	89
5	GlobalPort	94
8	Barako Bull	85

Quarterfinals (2nd phase) (Single elimination)
3	Rain or Shine	104
6	TNT	89
4	Barangay Ginebra	83
5	GlobalPort	84*

Semifinals (Best-of-7)
2	San Miguel	4
3	Rain or Shine	2
1	Alaska	4
5	GlobalPort	1

Finals (Best-of-7)
2	San Miguel	4
1	Alaska	3

*Game went into overtime

== Commissioner's Cup ==
=== Eliminations ===
==== Standings ====
Pos	Team	W	L	PCT	GB	Qualification
1	San Miguel Beermen	8	3	.727 (Note: Head-to-head record: San Miguel 1–0 Meralco)	—	Twice-to-beat in the quarterfinals
2	Meralco Bolts	8	3	.727	—	Twice-to-beat in the quarterfinals
3	Alaska Aces	7	4	.636 (Note: Head-to-head quotient: Alaska 1.18, Barangay Ginebra 1.03, Rain or Shine 0.84)	1	Best-of-three quarterfinals
4	Barangay Ginebra San Miguel	7	4	.636	1	Best-of-three quarterfinals
5	Rain or Shine Elasto Painters	7	4	.636	1	Best-of-three quarterfinals
6	Tropang TNT	6	5	.545	2	Best-of-three quarterfinals
7	NLEX Road Warriors	5	6	.455 (Note: Head-to-head record: NLEX 1–0 Star)	3	Twice-to-win in the quarterfinals
8	Star Hotshots	5	6	.455	3	Twice-to-win in the quarterfinals
9	Mahindra Enforcer	4	7	.364	4	
10	Blackwater Elite	3	8	.273 (Note: Head-to-head quotient: Blackwater 1.04, Phoenix 0.99, GlobalPort 0.98)	5	
11	Phoenix Fuel Masters	3	8	.273	5	
12	GlobalPort Batang Pier	3	8	.273	5	

Source: PBA.ph

=== Playoffs ===
==== Bracket ====
Quarterfinals
(#1 twice-to-beat)
1	San Miguel	99	103
8	Star	108	99
(Best-of-3)
4	Barangay Ginebra	0
5	Rain or Shine	2
(#2 twice-to-beat)
2	Meralco	104
7	NLEX	97
(Best-of-3)
3	Alaska	2
6	TNT	1

Semifinals (Best-of-5)
1	San Miguel	1
5	Rain or Shine	3
2	Meralco	2
3	Alaska	3

Finals (Best-of-7)
5	Rain or Shine	4
3	Alaska	2

== Governors' Cup ==
=== Eliminations ===
==== Standings ====
Pos	Team	W	L	PCT	GB	Qualification
1	TNT KaTropa	10	1	.909	—	Twice-to-beat in the quarterfinals
2	San Miguel Beermen	8	3	.727 (Note: Head-to-head record: San Miguel 1–0 Barangay Ginebra)	2	Twice-to-beat in the quarterfinals
3	Barangay Ginebra San Miguel	8	3	.727	2	Twice-to-beat in the quarterfinals
4	Meralco Bolts	6	5	.545 (Note: Head-to-head quotient: Meralco 1.039, Mahindra 1.017, Alaska 0.950; fourth seed playoff: Meralco 104–99 Mahindra)	4	Twice-to-beat in the quarterfinals
5	Mahindra Enforcer	6	5	.545	4	Twice-to-win in the quarterfinals
6	Alaska Aces	6	5	.545	4	Twice-to-win in the quarterfinals
7	NLEX Road Warriors	5	6	.455 (Note: Head-to-head quotient: NLEX 1.04, Rain or Shine 1.03, Phoenix 0.93; eighth seed playoff: Phoenix 105–94 Rain or Shine)	5	Twice-to-win in the quarterfinals
8	Phoenix Fuel Masters	5	6	.455	5	Twice-to-win in the quarterfinals
9	Rain or Shine Elasto Painters	5	6	.455	5	
10	GlobalPort Batang Pier	4	7	.364	6	
11	Star Hotshots	2	9	.182	8	
12	Blackwater Elite	1	10	.091	9	

Source: PBA.ph

==== Bracket ====
Quarterfinals (Top 4 twice-to-beat)
1	TNT	136
8	Phoenix	124
4	Meralco	105
5	Mahindra	82
2	San Miguel	114
7	NLEX	110
3	Barangay Ginebra	109
6	Alaska	104

Semifinals (Best-of-5)
1	TNT	1
4	Meralco	3
2	San Miguel	2
3	Barangay Ginebra	3

Finals (Best-of-7)
4	Meralco	2
3	Barangay Ginebra	4

== Transactions ==
=== Trades ===
==== Governors' Cup ====
July 13, 2016	To Phoenix Cyrus Baguio	To Alaska 2017 and 2018 second round picks

=== Recruited imports ===
Tournament	Name	Debuted	Last game	Record
Commissioner's Cup	No Import	February 19 (vs. Blackwater)		0–1
Commissioner's Cup	Shane Edwards	February 24 (vs. TNT)	April 8 (vs. Meralco)	6–3
Commissioner's Cup	Robert Dozier	April 15 (vs. NLEX)	May 18 (vs. Rain or Shine)	8–7
Governors' Cup	(United States) LaDontae Henton	July 17 (vs. Meralco)	September 23 (vs. Ginebra)	6–6
