= JVee Casio =

Filipino basketball player (born 1986)

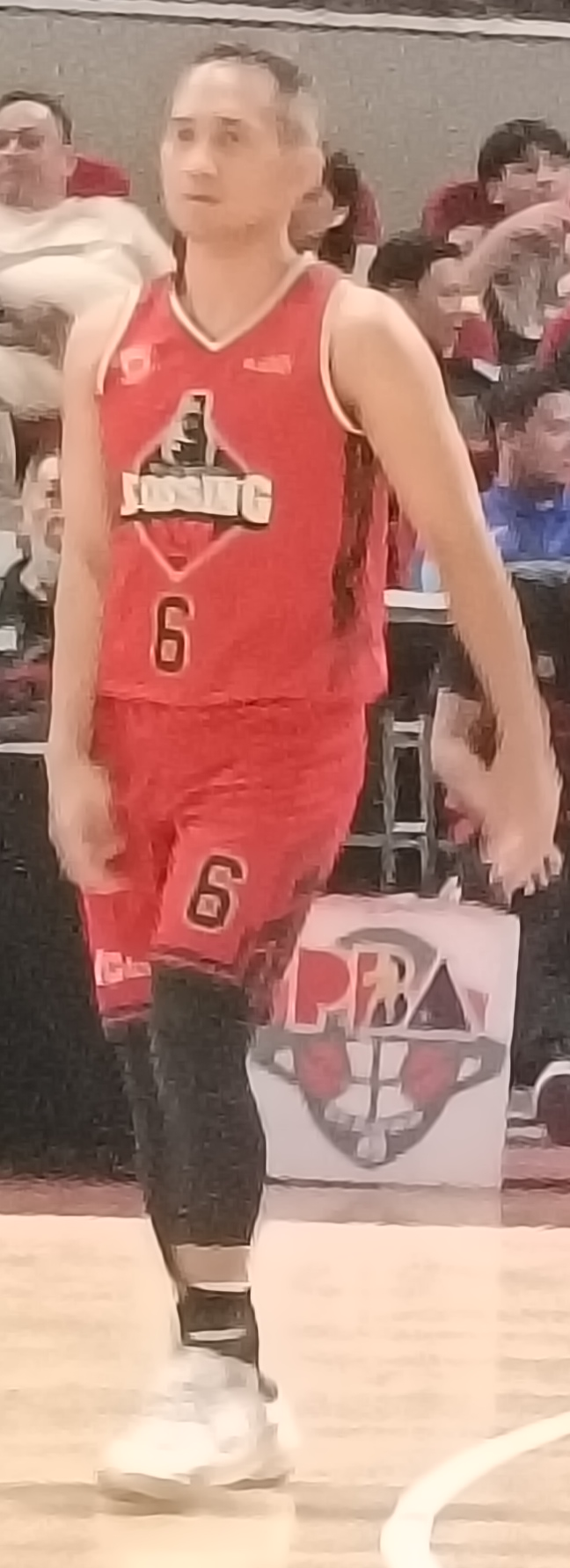
- Casio in 2025

No. 6 – Basilan Steel
- Position: Point guard
- League: MPBL

Personal information
- Born: September 1, 1986 (age 40) Makati, Philippines
- Listed height: 5 ft 10 in (1.78 m)
- Listed weight: 175 lb (79 kg)

Career information
- High school: San Beda (Manila)
- College: De La Salle
- PBA draft: 2011: 1st round1st overall
- Drafted by: Powerade Tigers
- Playing career: 2011–present

Career history
- 2011–2012: Powerade Tigers
- 2012–2021: Alaska Aces
- 2021–2025: Blackwater Bossing
- 2026–present: Basilan Steel

Career highlights
- PBA champion (2013 Commissioner's); 2× PBA Sportsmanship Award (2012, 2013); PBA All-Star (2012); PBA All-Rookie Team (2012); UAAP champion (2007); UAAP Finals MVP (2007); 2× UAAP Mythical Five (2007, 2008); UAAP Rookie of the Year (2003)

Joseph Evans "JVee" D. Casio (born September 1, 1986) is a Filipino professional basketball player for the Basilan Steel of the Maharlika Pilipinas Basketball League (MPBL). He played for three teams during his playing career in Philippine Basketball Association (PBA). He was drafted first overall by the Powerade Tigers in the 2011 PBA draft.

== Early life ==
Casio started playing basketball at the age of seven. He started by watching his brother play at their village and started his formal training during his stay at San Beda College, where was part of the San Beda Red Cubs squad in the NCAA Juniors Division. He helped the team sweep the eliminations of the 78th season of the NCAA. They faced the Letran Squires for the finals and won the 2002 NCAA juniors basketball championship, in which he was named the finals MVP.

He emerged as one of the top guns in his high school days as a Red Cub. He was known for his outside shooting skills, which made collegiate scouts interested to recruit him. San Beda tried to ask him to stay while Ateneo, FEU, and La Salle also made offers.

== College career ==
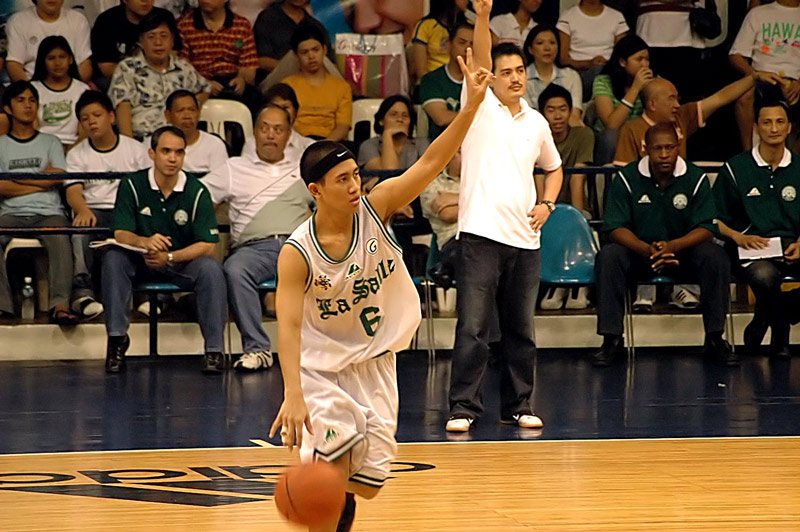
Casio with La Salle

Casio joined the De La Salle Green Archers in 2003. In that season, he was known to sink in two free throws to seal an overtime game with Ateneo Blue Eagles and win the round with triples in the Semi-Finals. He won the Rookie of the Year award.

In UAAP Season 67, he is one of the important players that led the De La Salle Green Archers the win in the final game against FEU Tamaraws. He hit the game-changing 3-pointer that defined his UAAP career as a clutch performer.

He is UAAP Season 70 Finals co-MVP (shared with Cholo Villanueva) when the De La Salle Green Archers edged the erstwhile undefeated UE Red Warriors to win the UAAP season 70 men's basketball championship. He was also selected as a member of the mythical five, with teammate Rico Maierhofer, Ateneo ace Chris Tiu, UE stalwart Mark Borboran, and season MVP UST's Jervy Cruz. During his last year with the Green Archers, he averaged 17 points, 4.1 rebounds, and 3.6 assists in 14 games.

== Smart Gilas ==
Casio decided not to enter the 2009 PBA draft because he was given an offer to play for the Smart Gilas national team, then coached by Rajko Toroman. He was a part of the squad that represented the Philippines in the FIBA Asia Stanković Cup 2010 and 2010 Asian Games Basketball Tournament together with PBA reinforcement Kelly Williams and Asi Taulava.

In the 2011 PBA Commissioner's Cup, Barako Bull filed a leave of absence for one season because of lack of budget. PBA Commissioner Chito Salud tapped Smart Gilas as Barako's replacement in their preparation for the 2011 FIBA Asia Champions Cup. He played 13 games, nine for the elimination round and four for the playoff round. He averaged 14.11 points per game, 3.33 rebounds per game and 5.22 assists per game in the eliminations. He also averaged 14.50 points per game, 3.75 rebounds per game, and 5.50 assists per game when they lost to Barangay Ginebra Kings 3–1 in the semi-finals and finished 3rd place in the league.

== Professional career ==
=== Powerade Tigers (2011–2012) ===
On August 16, 2011, he applied for the 2011 PBA draft. But Smart Gilas coach Rajko Toroman refused to let him join on the said draft. He then said to Toroman that he will surely play for the Gilas anytime his services are needed. On August 28, 2011, he was selected first overall in the draft by Powerade Tigers. Smart Gilas teammate Marcio Lassiter was also chosen by the Tigers as 4th overall.

He missed the first four games of the 2011–12 PBA Philippine Cup due to sore left knee. Upon his return from injury, he had slow start in his first few games as a professional, but eventually found his groove, helping Powerade reach the Finals against Talk 'N Text.

In his rookie season, he posted norms of 11.9 points, 6.4 assists, and 3.1 rebounds. These numbers though were not enough to give him the Rookie of the Year honors. Despite missing the Rookie of the Year honors, he was awarded Sportsman of the Year.

=== Alaska Aces (2012–2021) ===
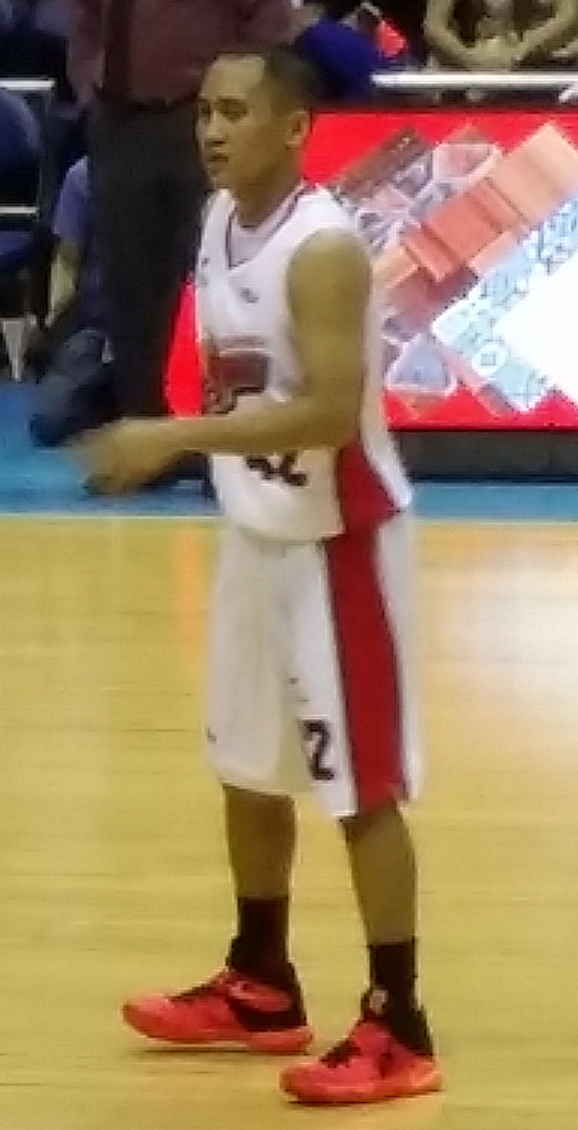
Casio with Alaska in 2016

Prior to the start of the 2012–13 PBA season, Casio was traded to the Alaska Aces to replace the spot of LA Tenorio, who was traded away to Ginebra. In his first conference with the Aces, he averaged 13.4 points, 4.3 assist, and 3.5 rebounds. He also helped capture the 2013 PBA Commissioner's Cup Finals trophy, scoring 18 points en route to their 14th title, the first in the post-Tim Cone era. He was given the Sportsmanship award for the second straight year.

The next season, he posted averages of 12.60 points, 3.53 rebounds and 3.02 assist per game, while providing steady presence at the point guard slot. However, in the first two conferences, his team was knocked out of the quarterfinal round. His team finally got over the hump in the 2014 PBA Governors' Cup, entering the semifinals against Rain or Shine.

During the Game 4 of their best of five semifinal series against the Elasto Painters, with his team leading the series 2–1, he intercepted a pass and streaked down the floor unmolested for a 1-on-0 fastbreak opportunity that could have resulted in the go-ahead basket. Instead of pushing Alaska through to the finals, he slipped on a wet spot in an unfortunate incident that not only saw him turn the ball over but also forced him to miss the deciding Game Five with an injury. As a result, Alaska lost the semifinal series.

He signed a fresh three-year contract extension with the Aces during the off-season.

=== Blackwater Bossing (2021–2025) ===
On October 13, 2021, Casio, along with Barkley Eboña, was traded to the Blackwater Bossing for Mike Tolomia and a 2022 second-round pick. On January 3, 2022, Casio signed a one-year contract extension with the Bossing.

On October 3, 2025, Casio announced his retirement.

=== Basilan Steel (2026–present) ===
On February 27, 2026, Casio came out of retirement, signing with the Basilan Steel of the Maharlika Pilipinas Basketball League (MPBL).

== PBA career statistics ==
Legend
GP	Games played	MPG	Minutes per game	FG%	Field-goal percentage
3FG%	3-point field-goal percentage	4P%	4-point field-goal percentage	FT%	Free-throw percentage
RPG	Rebounds per game	APG	Assists per game	SPG	Steals per game
BPG	Blocks per game	PPG	Points per game	127	Career high

=== Season-by-season averages ===
Year	Team	GP	MPG	FG%	3P%	4P%	FT%	RPG	APG	SPG	BPG	PPG
2011–12	Powerade	45	32.4	.395	.325	—	.798	3.1	6.4	.8	.0	11.9
2012–13	Alaska	51	33.4	.374	.340	—	.840	3.3	4.5	.9	.1	12.0
2013–14	Alaska	43	33.5	.435	.383	—	.779	3.5	3.0	.8	.2	12.6
2014–15	Alaska	52	26.8	.391	.320	—	.792	2.9	2.8	.6	.1	8.7
2015–16	Alaska	40	24.3	.412	.380	—	.828	2.5	2.8	.6	—	8.1
2016–17	Alaska	31	25.3	.494	.455	—	.792	3.2	3.5	.9	.1	11.4
2017–18	Alaska	51	23.8	.404	.342	—	.924	2.6	3.4	.5	.1	8.3
2019	Alaska	31	23.0	.464	.355	—	.774	2.2	2.8	.7	.1	9.3
2020	Alaska	12	25.3	.382	.293	—	.667	2.8	2.5	1.3	.2	7.7
2021	Alaska	19	22.3	.429	.333	—	.571	1.9	3.1	.8	—	8.9
2021	Blackwater	19	22.3	.429	.333	—	.571	1.9	3.1	.8	—	8.9
2022–23	Blackwater	23	23.9	.394	.378	—	.800	1.9	3.0	.8	.0	10.9
2023–24	Blackwater	12	13.8	.352	.270	—	.833	1.3	1.8	.2	—	4.8
2024–25	Blackwater	28	13.3	.333	.302	.154	.800	1.4	1.7	.4	.0	3.0
Career		438	26.2	.410	.352	.154	.811	2.7	3.4	.7	.1	9.5

== Awards and team achievements ==
=== Individual awards ===
- NCAA Season 78 Finals MVP
- UAAP Season 66 Rookie of the Year
- UAAP Season 70 Mythical Selection
- UAAP Season 70 Finals co-MVP
- UAAP Season 71 Mythical Selection

=== Team achievements ===
- NCAA Season 78 champions (San Beda Red Cubs)
- UAAP Season 70 champions (De La Salle Green Archers)
- 2011 PBA Commissioner's Cup 3rd-place finish (Smart Gilas)
- 2013 PBA Commissioner's Cup champions (Alaska Aces)

Preceded by	PCCL Finals MVP; 2008	Succeeded by Jai Reyes
