= Calvin Abueva =

Filipino basketball player (born 1988)

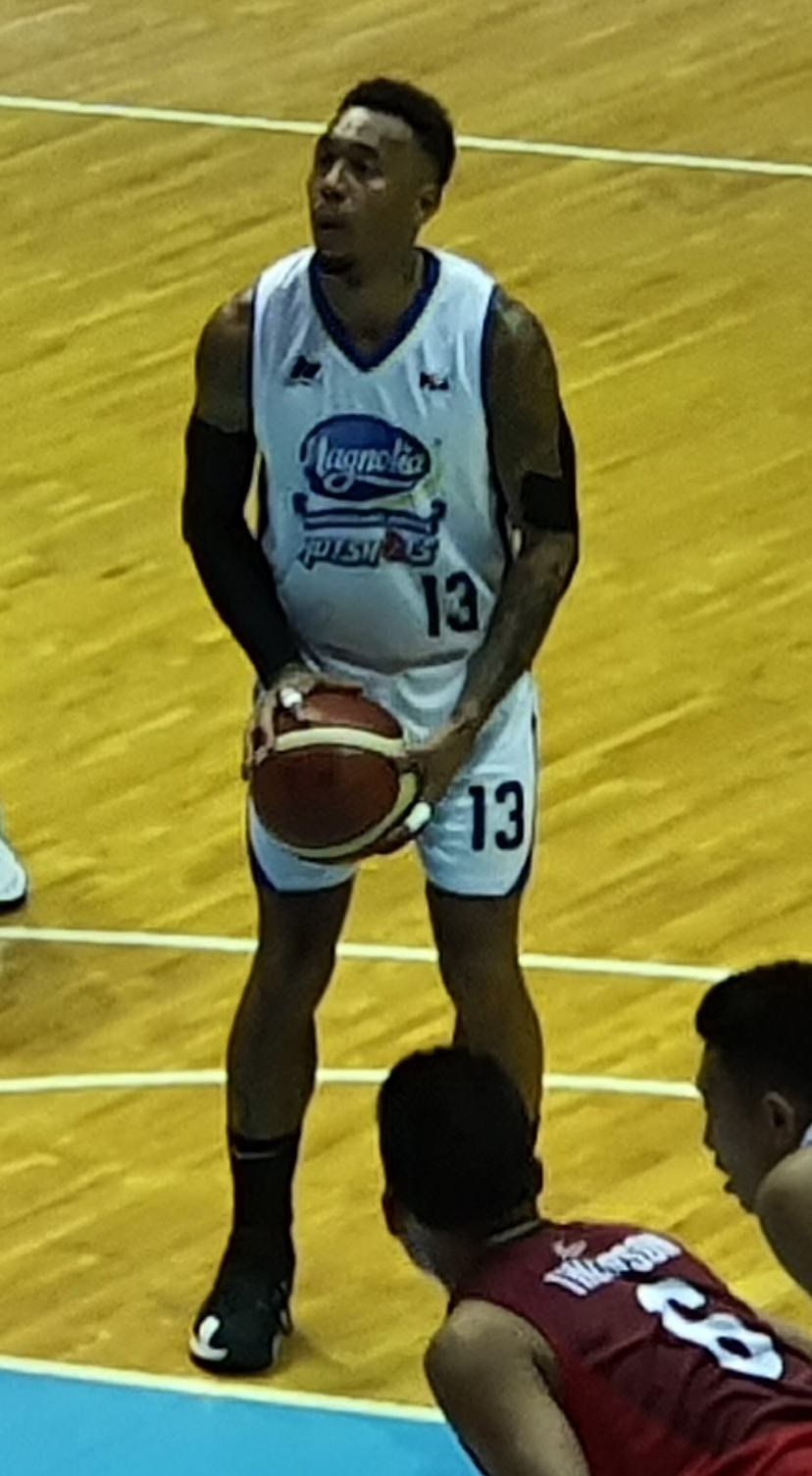
- Abueva with the Magnolia Hotshots in 2021

No. 8 – Converge FiberXers
- Position: Small forward / power forward
- League: PBA

Personal information
- Born: February 4, 1988 (age 38) Angeles City, Philippines
- Listed height: 6 ft 3 in (1.91 m)
- Listed weight: 209 lb (95 kg)

Career information
- High school: Holy Angel (Angeles City)
- College: San Sebastian
- PBA draft: 2012: 1st round, 2nd overall pick
- Drafted by: Alaska Aces
- Playing career: 2012–present

Career history
- 2012–2018: Alaska Aces
- 2018–2020: Phoenix Fuel Masters / Phoenix Pulse Fuel Masters / Phoenix Super LPG Fuel Masters
- 2021–2025: Magnolia Pambansang Manok Hotshots / Magnolia Chicken Timplados Hotshots
- 2025: NorthPort Batang Pier
- 2025–2026: Titan Ultra Giant Risers
- 2026–present: Converge FiberXers

Career highlights
- PBA champion (2013 Commissioner's); 2× PBA Best Player of the Conference (2016 Commissioner's, 2021 Philippine); 10× PBA All-Star (2013–2019, 2023, 2024, 2026); 4× PBA Mythical First Team (2013, 2016, 2020, 2021); 2× PBA Mythical Second Team (2015, 2023); 2× PBA All-Defensive Team (2015, 2020); PBA Rookie of the Year (2013); PBA All-Rookie Team (2013); PBA Mr. Quality Minutes (2015); NCAA Philippines champion (2009); NCAA Philippines Most Valuable Player (2011); 3× NCAA Philippines Mythical First Team (2009, 2010, 2011); PBL champion (2010 PG Flex-Erase Placenta); PBL Finals MVP (2010 PG Flex-Erase Placenta)

Calvin Abueva (born February 4, 1988) is a Filipino professional basketball player for the Converge FiberXers of the Philippine Basketball Association (PBA). He was picked second overall by the Alaska Aces during the 2012 PBA Draft. He was nicknamed "The Beast" due to the all-around threat he brings at both ends of the court, he dominated the nation's collegiate ranks by posting excellent numbers during his tenure with the San Sebastian College – Recoletos Stags in the NCAA. He also became the first player in collegiate basketball history to lead a college league in points, rebounds, and assists. Due to his versatility, him being frequently listed between 6'2 or 6'3, and his position as an undersized power forward for the Aces, Abueva has been frequently compared to the legendary import Sean Chambers.

== College and amateur career ==
Abueva studied at the San Sebastian College. He started his collegiate career in NCAA playing for the Stags in 2009. Abueva caught national acclaim as Jimbo Aquino’s key support when the San Sebastian Stags coached by Ato Agustin held off the San Beda Red Lions to claim the NCAA title in 2009. When Aquino moved out of SSC, he amply took over. He became the leader of a menacing trio that also consisted of Ronald Pascual and Ian Sangalang. He won the Most Valuable Player award during the 87th season of the NCAA by leading the league in scoring (20.6), rebounding (13.7), and was fourth in assists (3.9) although he also had an alarming league-high 5.6 turnovers.

In his 4th and final year in the NCAA, Abueva was favored to win his second and back-to-back MVP award.

He recorded 16 double-double's and 4 triple-double's, a league record but on August 25, 2012, in game against Lyceum, Abueva punched Lyceum's Vence Laude at the back of the head during a scuffle with 6:08 minutes left in the third quarter. He was then merited a disqualifying foul. A disqualifying foul automatically merits a one-game suspension. But worse, the suspension meted on the league's best player makes him ineligible to win any individual award this season If not for the misconduct, Alaska's No. 2 pick in the recent PBA draft would have handily won the MVP derby as he leads the current statistical race by a wide margin.

Abueva played for the NLEX Road Warriors in the PBA Developmental League. Playing with the talent-laden Road Warriors, he helped NLEX to win three straight championships.

== Professional career ==
=== Alaska Aces (2012–2018) ===
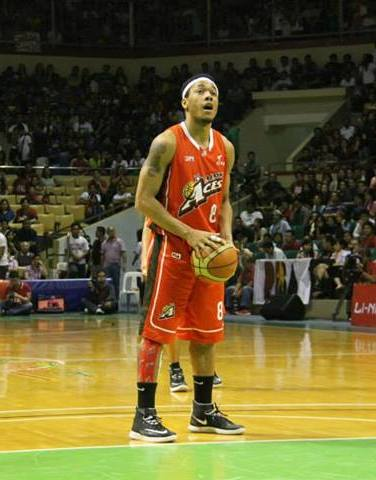
Abueva with the Alaska Aces in 2014

==== Early years ====
"It's nice to have Calvin because he brings so much to our team energy wise. He's going to be the backbone of this franchise. His energy is infectious and we were able to come back from 12 points down because of that. Once he started playing, he immediately became the energizer of our team. We’re fortunate to pick him second in the draft."

— Luigi Trillo, head coach of the Alaska Aces, about Abueva's debut game.

Abueva was not able to suit up in Alaska's first three assignments as he still needed to finish his duties with his school in the NCAA. In his highly anticipated debut game, Abueva made an immediate impact as he came through with a beastly performance against the Petron Blaze Boosters. Still smarting from his alma mater's NCAA final four loss to Letran 4 days before, he showed that he definitely is ready for the big leagues, finishing with 12 points and 16 rebounds in just 27 minutes.

Early in the season, he was one of the front-runners for the Best Player of the Conference title in the 2013 PBA conferences. Despite leading the statistical points in the past 2013 Philippine Cup and 2013 Commissioner's Cup conferences, he did not gain the Best Player of the Conference award. Nevertheless, his stellar performance in the first two conferences put him on the Rookie-MVP discussion, in which was only achieved by Benjie Paras. He was a big factor for the Alaska Aces' in winning the 2013 PBA Commissioner's Cup Championship. However, a dip in his performance as well as Alaska's quick exit in the season-ending Governors' Cup has eroded his claim to both awards.

Abueva was still awarded as the 2012–13 PBA Rookie of the Year despite the season ending struggles.

Abueva's struggles seemed to continue towards the next season. He felt that his penchant for fouling out and getting into foul trouble early in the game limited his chances of helping the Aces down the stretch on most of their games. Although Abueva claims he had tried to taper off his overeagerness on the defensive-end so he can stay out of foul trouble.

His coach Luigi Trillo, however, had different take. He felt Abueva may have been “shackled” this season compared to last, thinking that teams may have allowed Abueva to play his game last season. He felt that team's may have found ways to neutralize "The Beast" after trying to study his game. Pointing that after having a monstrous debut, teams' started to try to figure him out.

Despite the seeming limitations, he still tried his best to contribute to help Alaska win. He averaged about 20 mins of playing time with 9.2 points, 7.2 rebounds and 1.8 assists; worse than his numbers last season.

==== True form ====
In his third season, Abueva started to become an "Angry Beast". His stats have well improved from the previous season. On October 28, 2014, he was instrumental in a comeback 100–98 win against the Talk 'N Text after trailing by as much as 18 points and hit the game-winning buzzer beater. He finished the game with 26 big points and a career high, 22 rebounds, making him the shortest PBA player to record 20+ rebounds in a single game. On November 11, 2014, he then again recorded another 20-20 performance in a win against the Kia Sorento, scoring 23 points and grabbing 21 rebounds. He started the 2014–15 PBA Philippine Cup averaging 15.33 rebounds per game as the fans compared him to Dennis Rodman for his rebounding skills and suicidal hustle.

On May 13, 2016, Abueva was awarded the PBA Commissioner's Cup Best player of the conference award. He averaged 17.2 points, 7.6 rebounds, 2.8 assists and 1.4 steals in the tournament.

On October 14, 2016, Abueva was recognized during the PBA Leo Awards Night as he was named to the PBA Mythical First Team.

=== Phoenix Fuel Masters (2018–2020) ===
On August 7, 2018, Abueva was traded to the Phoenix Fuel Masters for Karl Dehesa and a 2019 first-round draft pick. In his debut for the Fuel Masters against the Columbian Dyip back on August 22, 2018, Abueva came off the bench and recorded 12 points, 13 rebounds and 5 assists in just 23 minutes of playing time.

Abueva was suspended indefinitely and fined in June 2019 for two separate infractions; for the clothesline against TNT KaTropa import Terrence Jones and for doing obscene gestures to the girlfriend of Blackwater Elite player Bobby Parks Jr. Abueva's suspension lasted for about 16 months and there were multiple bids for Abueva to be able to rejoin Phoenix. In September 2019, Abueva was allowed to join Phoenix's practice sessions due to his gaining weight. Abueva was not able to join Phoenix for the 2019 season's Commissioner's and Governors' Cup.

For the 2020 season, Abueva is allowed to join Phoenix's, now known as the Phoenix Super LPG Fuel Masters, in its scrimmages, but was barred from playing in tune-up games and the pocket tournament the PBA team organized in preparation for the Philippine Cup in early 2020. The conference was postponed due to the COVID-19 pandemic giving Abueva time to formally rejoin. In July 2020, Abueva made public the moves he had to make for his suspension to be lifted including undergoing drug and psychological tests. Abueva's suspension was lifted in October 2020, enabling him to play games for Phoenix at the Philippine Cup which was restarted within a bubble format.

=== Magnolia Hotshots (2021–2025) ===
On February 17, 2021, Abueva, along with the 2021 first-round pick, was traded to the Magnolia Hotshots for Chris Banchero, 2021 first-round pick and 2021 second-round pick.

On December 20, 2023, Abueva signed a three-year contract extension with the Hotshots.

Abueva was fined P100,000 for making a mocking gesture towards Jorge Gallent in Game 2 on February 4 in the PBA Commissioner's Cup Finals. He also settled his issue with Moala Tautuaa and his wife on their shouting spat in the aftermath of Game 2.

On March 31, 2024, Abueva flashed his middle finger to a fan in Magnolia's eventual Manila Clasico loss to Ginebra. PBA deputy commissioner Eric Castro said the league issued summons for Abueva on April 2. Accordingly, PBA Commissioner Willie Marcial imposed a one-game suspension and P20,000 fine with stern warning upon Abueva.

=== NorthPort Batang Pier (2025) ===
On May 27, 2025, Magnolia traded Abueva, Jerrick Balanza, and a season 51 second-round draft pick to the NorthPort Batang Pier in exchange for William Navarro.

=== Titan Ultra Giant Risers (2025) ===
After Pureblends Corporation acquired the NorthPort franchise, Abueva was one of the holdovers for the new Titan Ultra Giant Risers. In the team's inaugural game, Abueva scored a career-high 41 points against the Meralco Bolts to led the team's first-ever victory.

=== Converge FiberXers (2026–present) ===
On February 3, 2026, Abueva was traded to the Converge FiberXers in exchange for King Caralipio, Mark Omega, and Rey Suerte.

== Career statistics ==
=== PBA ===
Legend
GP	Games played	MPG	Minutes per game	FG%	Field-goal percentage
3FG%	3-point field-goal percentage	4P%	4-point field-goal percentage	FT%	Free-throw percentage
RPG	Rebounds per game	APG	Assists per game	SPG	Steals per game
BPG	Blocks per game	PPG	Points per game	127	Career high

As of the end of 2024–25 season

Year	Team	GP	MPG	FG%	3P%	4P%	FT%	RPG	APG	SPG	BPG	PPG
2012–13	Alaska	51	26.4	.384	.262	—	.630	9.5	1.8	.9	.8	12.3
2013–14	Alaska	42	20.8	.332	.148	—	.641	7.2	1.8	.9	.4	9.2
2014–15	Alaska	57	22.9	.447	.138	—	.647	8.9	2.3	.9	.5	12.9
2015–16	Alaska	58	25.6	.437	.333	—	.648	8.5	2.5	1.1	.5	15.4
2016–17	Alaska	28	26.4	.455	.253	—	.591	8.7	2.3	1.3	1.1	15.8
2017–18	Alaska	29	24.4	.400	.282	—	.527	10.0	2.9	1.2	1.4	14.1
2017–18	Phoenix	29	24.4	.400	.282	—	.527	10.0	2.9	1.2	1.4	14.1
2019	Phoenix Pulse	19	27.9	.333	.260	—	.622	11.7	3.3	1.3	.8	14.8
2020	Phoenix Super LPG	12	35.0	.456	.290	—	.712	11.3	5.2	1.7	.7	15.4
2021	Magnolia	34	30.0	.430	.308	—	.730	8.8	2.3	1.0	.9	14.5
2022–23	Magnolia	47	27.0	.437	.238	—	.718	7.6	2.8	1.1	.8	12.5
2023–24	Magnolia	22	19.8	.340	.148	—	.750	6.8	2.0	1.0	.6	7.0
2024–25	Magnolia	39	18.4	.424	.240	.000	.688	6.4	1.8	.8	.5	8.4
2024–25	NorthPort	39	18.4	.424	.240	.000	.688	6.4	1.8	.8	.5	8.4
Career		438	24.8	.413	.267	.000	.648	8.5	2.4	1.1	.7	12.6

=== College ===
Led the league

Year	Team	GP	MPG	FG%	3P%	FT%	RPG	APG	SPG	BPG	PPG
2011	San Sebastian	22	29.0	.411	.265	.726	13.7	3.9	.7	.6	20.6
2012	San Sebastian	17	33.0	.364	.216	.724	16.4	6.5	1.2	1.6	20.1

== Personal life ==
Calvin Abueva was born to a Filipina mother, Evelyn and African-American father, Calvin Sweeney. As a young boy in Angeles City, he followed a routine wherein he would watch his childhood idol Robert Jaworski on television at night and by noon the next day, he would mimic what he saw on television on the cement courts of Bayanihan Park. He observed how Jaworski became one of the PBA's best rebounders of all-time despite being a guard and tried his best to duplicate the legendary grit with his pals. Aside from basketball, Abueva also played volleyball during his childhood years. Calvin also has a younger brother, Richard Ramsey, who after being raised by foster parents after being left for adoption at the age of three months, finally met Calvin, mother Evelyn and his three other siblings in 2010. Like his brother, Richard also plays basketball, playing for De Ocampo Memorial College in Santa Mesa, Manila and currently serves as an assistant coach for the De Ocampo Cobras.
