= Wendell McKines =

American professional basketball player

Personal information
- Born: August 18, 1988 (age 37) Oakland, California, U.S.
- Listed height: 6 ft 6 in (1.98 m)
- Listed weight: 230 lb (104 kg)

Career information
- High school: Richmond (Richmond, California)
- College: New Mexico State (2007–2012)
- NBA draft: 2012: undrafted
- Playing career: 2012–2019
- Position: Power forward

Career history
- 2012–2013: SPO Rouen Basket
- 2013: Alaska Aces
- 2013: ESSM Le Portel
- 2014: Anyang KGC
- 2014–2015: Ironi Ashkelon
- 2015: Rain or Shine Elasto Painters
- 2015: Estudiantes Concordia
- 2015–2016: Wonju Dongbu Promy
- 2016: Cocodrilos de Caracas
- 2016: Reales de La Vega
- 2016: Jiangsu Hualan
- 2016–2017: Wonju Dongbu Promy
- 2017: San Miguel Beermen
- 2017–2018: Busan KT Sonicboom
- 2018: Cocodrilos de Caracas
- 2018–2019: Mineros de Zacatecas
- 2019: Club Malvín
- 2019: Denain Voltaire Basket

Career highlights
- LPB champion (2016); LPB Grand Final MVP (2016); WAC tournament MVP (2012)

Wendell Stuart McKines (born August 18, 1988) is an American former professional basketball player. He is known for his moniker as Mr. Wensday.

== High school career ==
Born in Oakland, California, McKines averaged 35.0 points, 15.0 rebounds and 3.4 blocks as a senior for Richmond High School, and led the RHS Oilers to a 22-9 finish and a North Coast Section Division II Championship in 2007. He is No. 6 on the all-time scoring list in California with 3,034 career points. He was named the San Francisco Chronicle Metro Area and Contra Costa Times Boys Player of the Year. He was also a first team all-state selection and Alameda/Contra Costa Athletic League Co-Most Valuable Player. ESPN listed him as the No. 22 small forward in the Class of 2007 while Scout.com placed him at the No. 37 power forward spot. Statistically, he ranked in the top 10 in four categories in California. He is No. 4 in career rebounds (1,523), No. 6 in career scoring average (30.3) and No. 9 in season-single scoring (1,080) in addition to the No. 6 position on the all-time scoring list, which includes the likes of Jason Kidd. He reached the 40-point or more plateau 11 times and scored over 50 points twice. He committed to play for New Mexico State University in 2007.

== College career ==
As a freshman, McKines played in all 35 games and started in 12 of them. He averaged 6.4 points and 5.9 rebounds per contest, which ranked fourth on the team. McKines shot 57.3 percent from the field and he recorded 27 assists, 14 blocks and 20 steals.

During his sophomore season, he increased his production, especially on the boards. He led the Western Athletic Conference (WAC) with 10.0 rebounds per game, which was No. 18 in the country. He collected 319 boards, a mark that ranked fifth on the school's single-season list. Offensively, he averaged 12.1 points per contest and shot 48.6 percent from the field and 38.5 from the 3-point line. He played in all 32 games and started in 27. He tallied 52 assists, 36 steals and 22 blocks, 16 double-doubles and led the team in rebounding on 28 occasions.

In his junior season, he started in 23 games for the Aggies, averaging 10.7 points and 9.8 rebounds per game, a team-best mark, en route to helping the Aggies to a WAC Tournament title and NCAA Tournament appearance. He shot 48.2 percent from the field, 37.2 percent from 3-point line and 56.5 percent at the free-throw line. He also had 74 assists, 17 blocks and 15 steals. He ranked first in the WAC in conference games with 9.8 rebounds per game. He also posted nine double-doubles (27 in his career), and was an honorable mention All-WAC selection.

Before the start of his senior season, he suffered a broken foot during practice and redshirted the entire 2010-2011 season.

In his final season, he averaged 18.7 points and 10.7 rebounds per game, which led both the Aggies and WAC and was No. 8 in the NCAA in rebounds per game and No. 29 in points per game, while also shot 46.1 percent from field, 35.2 percent from 3-point line and 76.0 percent from free-throw line. He also posted 20 double-doubles as a senior, which ranked fifth in the nation, and totaled 47 career double-doubles as an Aggie. He was named the 2012 WAC Tournament Most Valuable Player after leading the Aggies to their second conference tournament title in three years and 19th NCAA Tournament berth. He earned National Association of Basketball Coaches (NABC) All-District Six team and U.S. Basketball Writers Association (USBWA) All-District VIII team honors. He became only the second member of the 1,000-career point and 1,000-career rebound club at NM State, and was only the second player in school history along with Sam Lacey, second active player in the NCAA and 12th player in WAC history to achieve the feat.

He ended his college career as No. 2 on the school's all-time rebounding list (1,135) and No. 8 on the all-time scoring list (1,521). He ranked third in both games played (126) and minutes played (3,576) in school history. He was tied for eighth in career rebounding average (9.0), 10th in career blocked shots (66), ninth in career field goals made (582), eighth in career field goals attempted (1,194) and ninth in career free throw attempts (432).

== Professional career ==
McKines went undrafted in the 2012 NBA draft, making him an unrestricted free agent. He then played in professional leagues overseas in France, Philippines, South Korea, and Israel. He recently suited up for the Rain or Shine Elasto Painters in the PBA.

On July 4, 2015, he registered a career-high 53 points (18 in the fourth quarter), together with 17 boards, five assists, five blocks, and two steals in 43 minutes as he singlehandedly carried Rain or Shine to victory against San Miguel that tied their semifinal series with one game apiece.

On November 3, 2019, McKines returned to Israel for a second stint, signing with Maccabi Ra'anana of the Israeli National League as an injury cover for Tyler Wideman. On November 22, 2019, he parted ways with Ra'anana after appearing in three games.
