= Alaska Aces (PBA) =

Philippine professional basketball team

- Founded: 1986
- Folded: Sold in 2022
- History: Alaska Milkmen (1986, 1988–1989, 1991–2000); Hills Bros. Coffee Kings (1987); Alaska Air Force (1990); Alaska Aces (2001–2022)
- Team colors: Red, Black, White
- Company: Alaska Milk Corporation
- Team manager: Richard Bachman
- Head coach: Jeffrey Cariaso
- Ownership: Wilfred Uytengsu Jr.
- Championships: 14 championships 1991 Third Conference; 1994 Governors'; 1995 Governors'; 1996 All-Filipino; 1996 Commissioner's; 1996 Governors'; 1997 Governors'; 1998 All-Filipino; 1998 Commissioner's; 2000 All-Filipino; 2003 Invitational; 2007 Fiesta; 2010 Fiesta; 2013 Commissioner's 31 Finals appearances
- Retired numbers: 7 (6, 7, 14, 16, 20, 22, 33)
- Website: www.alaskaaces.com.ph
Light jersey	Dark jersey	Retro jersey

The Alaska Aces were a professional basketball team in the Philippine Basketball Association (PBA) from 1986 to 2022 under the ownership of Alaska Milk Corporation (AMC) and the owner of 14 PBA championships, tied with the Magnolia Hotshots for the third-most titles overall. They were one of the most popular teams in the league.

The Aces won nine PBA championships in the 1990s, including a rare grand slam (winning three championships in one season) during the 1996 season, joining the Crispa Redmanizers (1976, 1983), San Miguel Beermen (1989), and the San Mig Super Coffee Mixers (2013–14) as one of only four franchises to achieve the feat. They went on to win five more titles in the 2000s and 2010s for a total of 14 championships.

The Aces' last tournament was the 2021 PBA Governors' Cup where they were eliminated by the NLEX Road Warriors in the quarterfinal round in March 2022. The franchise was bought by Converge ICT on March 23, 2022, to become the Converge FiberXers.

The team, like the company which owns it, has no connection to the US state of Alaska.

== History ==
=== 1986: First season ===
After the temporary departure of the Magnolia franchise (now known as the San Miguel Beermen) prior to the start of the 1986 PBA season, the league was reduced to only five teams. Alaska Milk was accepted as the league's sixth member. The team was headed by Filipino-American owner Wilfred Steven Uytengsu, team manager Joel Aquino and their coach was Tony Vasquez, who played for Ateneo de Manila during his playing days and as a coach, he piloted the Ateneo juniors to an NCAA championship and also once mentored the Blue Eagles.

Being a pro league newcomer, the ballclub was allowed to choose players from the pool presented by the PBA. Among the players they choose from the pool were Arnie Tuadles and Ricky Relosa from Ginebra, Rudy Distrito, Marte Saldaña and Noli Banate from Magnolia, Alejo Alolor, Teddy Alfarero and Frankie Lim from Great Taste, and Dennis Abbatuan from Shell. In the 1986 PBA draft, as the newest member of the league, they had the first crack and Alaska selected Rey Cuenco as the number one overall pick. In the second and third rounds, they choose Ludovico Valenciano and Reynaldo Ramos.

Their very first two imports in the first conference of the season were PBA veteran Donnie Ray Koonce and Jerry Eaves, a third round draft pick by the Utah Jazz in 1982 and who played for Utah's entire 82-game regular season in his rookie year. Keith Morrison and Norman Black also suited up as imports that season. Alaska placed fourth in their inaugural conference.

However, during the season, Vasquez passed away due to a heart attack. Cesar Jota stepped in as the head coach for the rest of the season. Alaska then missed out the semifinal round in the second and third conferences, placing fifth and sixth. Overall, they finished with a 20–29 record in their first season, their lowest win percentage in franchise history.

=== 1987–1988: Bruise Brothers era ===
A strike within Alaska Milk Corporation led the team to play under a different brand. AMC brought in Hills Bros. Coffee to mitigate the strike's impact on its brand. The ballclub, temporarily renamed as the Hills Bros. Coffee Kings, had a new coach in Nat Canson, who last coached the Gold Eagle Beer squad in 1984. Following Manila Beer's disbandment, the Coffee Kings acquired three players from the Brewmasters; Elpidio Villamin, Tim Coloso and sophomore Adonis Tierra. They also acquired three-time PBA MVP William 'Bogs' Adornado from Shell via trade and Ginebra discard Joey Marquez, but lost leading scorer and passer Tuadles to Great Taste.

In the 1987 All-Filipino Conference, the Coffee Kings surprisingly made it to the finals against corporate rival Great Taste Coffee Makers. This marked the birth of the tandem known as the "Bruise Brothers" in Yoyoy Villamin and Ricky Relosa, both players during their earlier years in the PBA were the promising forwards of legendary teams Crispa and Toyota. Villamin played alongside Abet Guidaben and Philip Cezar for Crispa while Relosa were teammates with Ramon Fernandez and Abe King at Toyota. The Coffee Kings were swept in the finals by Great Taste in three games. Coach Nat Canson resigned three weeks after the championship series to coach in the PABL.

Former Tanduay coach Arturo Valenzona, who himself was just fired from the job by Tanduay management after the Rhum Makers were eliminated, accepted the offer to coach the Hills Bros. Coffee Kings starting the third conference. Parading sweet-shooting import Jose Slaughter, on October 18 against Great Taste, they won 129–115 as he broke the previous record for most three-point shots converted with 14 triples and finished with 79 points. Hills Bros. were in their second finals stint after beating the Billy Ray Bates led-Ginebra in the playoffs. They faced the San Miguel Beermen (formerly Magnolia) in the Reinforced Conference championship series and after winning Game One, they lost the next four games and finished bridesmaid for the second straight conference of the season.

Returning to Alaska Milk in the 1988 PBA season, the team signed three players from Shell; Rey Lazaro, Biboy Ravanes and Willie Pearson to strengthen its lineup. Before the start of the season, Bogs Adornado announced his retirement from active playing and was given recognition by the PBA in the opening day on March 20, 1988, with a jersey retirement ceremony, making his #33 jersey the first to be retired in franchise history. Alaska placed third in the Open and All-Filipino conferences of the season. Bogs Adornado would replace Arturo Valenzona as the team's head coach beginning the third conference.

=== 1989–1992: Arrival of coach Tim Cone and Jolas with their 1st title ===
In the year 1989, the team drafted Paul Alvarez and the backcourt tandem of Ric-Ric Marata and Elmer Cabahug. 16-time champion center Abet Guidaben also joined the team. During the first conference, Bogs Adornado was sacked after the elimination round and team manager Joel Aquino handled the team on interim basis.Sean Chambers, who played with the American selection in two previous PBA/IBA series, was hired as their import to replace their first choice Carl Lott in the 1989 Open Conference. Chambers led Alaska to a third-place finish in his first PBA stint. Shortly after, American Tim Cone, a member of the PBA's Vintage Sports panel, accepted the coaching chores full-time for Alaska Milk starting in the All-Filipino Conference after starting as a consultant.

In 1990, Joaqui Trillo was also invited that year by Uytengsu to join the team as the new team manager. On April 26, Alvarez scored a league-record 71 points, the most points by a local during the semifinals of the First Conference. His record would be broken a year later by Allan Caidic. The Milkmen then followed it up by going went winless in the semifinals of the 1990 All-Filipino Conference. They then got rid of one of their veterans; Abet Guidaben, who was traded to Pepsi for Harmon Codiñera.

In the Third Conference of the 1990 PBA season, Alaska finally advanced in the finals for the third time in franchise history and their first since the 1987 season. Going up against the Purefoods Hotdogs, both teams were gunning for their first championship. Alaska had former Boston Celtic Carlos Clark and Chambers as their imports to be pitted against Daren Queenan and Robert Rose of the Hotdogs. The Milkmen went up 2–0 in the best-of-five title series and on the threshold of winning their first trophy, but Purefoods came back and won the last three games to capture the title. In Game Three of that series, Alvarez injured his Achilles tendon.

==== 1991–1992:The Jolas era ====
Beginning the 1991 PBA season, the team let go of its vital cog, Yoyoy Villamin, who was traded along with Ric-Ric Marata to Sarsi. Elmer Cabahug was shipped to Purefoods and Alaska acquired the Hotdogs' star player Jojo Lastimosa to team up with Alvarez as an athletic high-scoring duo. Alaska signed their two first round picks in the 1991 draft, center Alex Araneta and point guard Eugene Quilban, and their third rookie, Rhoel Gomez, a second round selection. There were criticisms on some of Alaska's moves during the off-season as they say experience was supposed to win championships instead of develop younger players.

After a third-place showing in the All-Filipino Conference, the Milkmen returned to the finals in the Third Conference with Alvarez back in form after being idle for almost eight months, recuperating from the injury he suffered in 1990. Playing against crowd-favorite Ginebra San Miguel, the Milkmen finally won their first PBA title, winning the best of five series, three games to one. Alaska import Sean Chambers got the better of his counterpart, Ginebra import Wes Matthews, in the four-game series, with Alvarez also holding Matthews down.

In 1992, Alaska owned the second pick in the draft and they choose the burly 6'4" Stevenson Solomon, who had been in the mold of a Yoyoy Villamin and was part of the national team that regain the SEA Games basketball gold in Manila. Another national player, Allen Sasan, was chosen by Alaska in the first round. Despite a stronger lineup compared to the previous year, and with Lastimosa and Alvarez playing together for one full season, the Milkmen finished third in the First Conference and were eliminated in the All-Filipino and third conferences.

=== 1993–1995: The Abarrientos era and the rivalry with Sunkist ===
Alaska previously had solid point guards in the past four years to back up their veteran and starting point guard Frankie Lim; Ric-ric Marata for two years, then Eugene Quilban and Gilbert 'Jun' Reyes (whom Quilban was traded for), who were all big names during their amateur days. In 1993, Alaska picked another point guard in the rookie draft as the third overall pick, former FEU Tamaraw Johnny Abarrientos, who had been making waves in the Philippine Basketball League (PBL), winning PBL titles and league MVPs for three seasons. He became the starting point guard of Alaska as Lim, the last among the original Milkmen, decided to moved out and join the Purefoods TJ Hotdogs. That year became a rebuilding year as off-the-court issues and contract issues with Alvarez led to him being acquired for forward Bong Hawkins from the Sta. Lucia Realtors. Abarrientos, Lastimosa, and Hawkins became the leaders of the team.

The beginning of what turned out to be a dynasty started before the 1994 season. The team selected 6'5" center Poch Juinio fifth overall in the 1994 PBA draft. After a third-place finish in the All-Filipino Cup and a finals appearance in the Commissioner's Cup, Alaska would win their second PBA title in the third conference (now known as the Governors' Cup), defeating the Swift Mighty Meaties in six games.

Alaska continued to bolster its roster with young talent, trading underwhelming big man Stevenson for the 6th pick in the 1995 PBA draft. They used the pick on Jeffrey Cariaso. Cariaso would win Rookie of the Year for the 1995 PBA season, contributing to Alaska's finals appearances. Swift, renamed as the Sunkist Orange Juicers, became Alaska's finals rival that year. They played for the championship in the first two conferences of the season and the Orange Juicers prevailed both times. The three consecutive finals meeting between the two teams was the first since Crispa and Toyota in 1975–1976. Alaska was able to stop Sunkist's quest for a grand slam by retaining the Governors Cup crown, defeating San Miguel Beermen in seven games.

=== 1996: Grand Slam ===
Alaska returned to the All-Filipino Cup finals against Purefoods, who were back in the finals after missing out in 1995. The Milkmen were considered the underdogs before the best of seven title showdown. They outbattled a tough and gritty TJ Hotdogs and won in just five games. Last season's rookie of the year Jeffrey Cariaso converted two free throws with 0.6 of a second remaining in overtime of Game Five and Purefoods up by one, 92–91, to win it in a fitting moment as Alaska won their first All-Filipino title and their fourth PBA crown.

The Milkmen were in their seventh straight finals appearance when they went up against surprise finalist Formula Shell for the Commissioner's Cup title. The Milkmen were given a hard time by the Shell team of Benjie Paras, Victor Pablo and import Kenny Redfield. The finals went into a seventh and deciding game as Alaska's championship experience prove to be a key factor in winning, 83–77. Their import, Sean Chambers, was a late replacement for Derrick Hamilton, who was sent packing after traces of marijuana were discovered in his urine during the last stages of the semifinals.

In the Governor's Cup, Alaska completed the PBA's fourth grand slam, defeating Ginebra San Miguel in five games. For the season, they won 51 games, the most in a grand slam campaign. In the year-end awards, Abarrientos was named Most Valuable Player, Bong Hawkins settled for the Mythical Team alongside Jojo Lastimosa, Cariaso made the All-Defensive team, starting center Poch Juinio was the season's Most Improved Player and Sean Chambers was a runaway winner of the best import award.

=== 1997–1998: The dynasty continues ===
Before the 1997 PBA season started, Alaska lost three players who were integral part of the team that bagged four straight titles. They were Jun Reyes, whom Alaska dealt to Sta. Lucia in exchange for Boyet Fernandez, center Cris Bolado, who moved to Purefoods, and Jeffrey Cariaso, who was shipped to Mobiline. New acquisitions Dwight Lago, Rodney Santos and Boyet Fernandez would be hampered by their unfamiliarity with Alaska's vaunted triangle offense.

Coach Tim Cone in 1997

In the All-Filipino Cup, the Milkmen were eliminated from the semifinals for the first time in four years. They return to the finals in the Commissioner's Cup but lost to Gordon's Gin Boars (formerly Ginebra) in six games. Alaska was able to retain the only crown left from their grand slam conquest last year by winning their fourth straight Governor's Cup trophy. Late in the eliminations, they acquired veteran center Jack Tanuan and the high-flying Kenneth Duremdes in exchange for Dwight Lago and Fernandez from Pop Cola. Duremdes ably filled the role previously occupied by Cariaso and in the title series against the Purefoods Carne Norte Beefies, the Milkmen had an easier time in winning four games to one after losing the series opener. Alaska showed no mercy in a 94–66 rout in Game Five.

The Milkmen were in a bid for a second grand slam in the 1998 season after defeating the Ron Jacobs-coached San Miguel Beermen twice in the finals of the first two conferences. They came back from a 2–3 series deficit in the All-Filipino Cup to win in seven games. In the Commissioner's Cup, Devin Davis became the only other Alaska import in the 1990s besides Sean Chambers to lead the team to the crown. The Milkmen won their 9th PBA title, tying the famed Toyota Super Corollas as the third winningest ball club.

The possible 'Grand Slam II' for the team didn't happen with the 1998 Asian Games set in December and Cone being named head coach of the Philippine team, and Abarrientos, Duremdes and Lastimosa were tapped to lead the team. Assistants Jun Reyes and Dickie Bachmann took over for Alaska. But despite strong showings from the slasher Rodney Santos and their resident shooter, Rhoel Gomez, the Milkmen failed to enter the semis of both the special 1998 PBA Centennial Cup and the season-ending Governor's Cup. Hawkins also went down with a season-ending injury. Duremdes was named the Most Valuable Player at the end of the year, the second Alaska Milkman to win the coveted individual award.

=== 1999–2000: 10th PBA title ===
With the arrival of some talented Filipino-American cagers in the league, the Milkmen opted to stick with the same core for the 1999 season. In the All-Filipino Cup, the Milkmen were eliminated by expansion team Tanduay in the semis. In the Commissioner's Cup, Devin Davis made his return to the team, but the young San Miguel team of Danny Ildefonso and Danny Seigle conspired with their import, Terquin Mott, to eliminate the Aces in five games. They finished third in the tournament. Alaska advanced to the Finals of the Governor's Cup with Chambers at the helm but San Miguel, led by Lamont "The Helicopter" Strothers, defeated the Milkmen in six games despite Alaska getting an early 2–1 series lead.

In 2000, Jojo Lastimosa was traded to Pop Cola as part of the team's future plan to rebuild. Alaska won their 10th PBA title at the expense of Purefoods in the All-Filipino Cup. Purefoods won Game One of this series but the Milkmen won the next four games to win the title. The Milkmen then failed to enter the Finals of the Commissioner's Cup after they were eliminated by the Beermen in the semi-finals.

=== 2000–2022: Alaska Aces ===
As part of the league's move to strengthen its marketing, Alaska adopted a new moniker, the Alaska Aces. The name was chosen for its catchiness and as a reference to fighter pilots known as "aces".

==== 2001–02 seasons ====
Before the 2001 season, the Aces retooled their roster around their younger players. They traded Johnny Abarrientos and Poch Juinio to the Pop Cola Panthers for forward Ali Peek and guard Jon Ordonio. In the draft, Alaska used the fifth pick to draft Fil-Am John Arigo. The Aces also signed Duremdes to a reported 48 million peso deal for seven years. Then they traded Bong Hawkins to Tanduay for a draft pick. In the All-Filipino Cup, the Aces were eliminated in the quarterfinals by Abarrientos and Pop Cola. In the Commissioners Cup, a strong showing by Peek gave defending champion San Miguel a fight but still loss in five games of the semis. In the Governors Cup, Chambers retired three games into the season. In a simple ceremony, the Aces retired his #20 jersey, becoming the second player in team history to have his number retired. In that conference, they were eliminated in the quarterfinals by Pop Cola once again.

Duremdes was borrowed by the Philippine National Team in 2002 and Lastimosa made his return to Alaska. The Aces began the Governor's Cup with Ron Riley and Montreal Dobbins as imports, but after 6 games, Dobbins was replaced by James Head. Together, they advanced to the finals of the against Purefoods. The Aces led 2–0 in the seven-game series, but the TJ Hotdogs won the next three games. After Alaska tied it up in Game Six, Purefoods won Game seven to deny the Aces its 11th title. In the Commissioner's Cup, Ajani Williams and Chris Carrawell bannered the Aces but were eliminated by Talk N' Text in the semi-finals. Duremdes returned for the Aces in the All-Filipino Cup and they made it to the finals. After winning Game 1, the Aces lost the next three games to settle another runner-up finish.

==== 2002–03 season: Invitational Champs ====
In the 2003 PBA draft, Alaska held the first overall pick and selected De La Salle University star point guard Mike Cortez. They then shocked the league by trading Kenneth Duremdes to the Sta. Lucia Realtors for the fifth pick of the first round. This enabled Alaska to get Brandon Cablay. During the offseason, Lastimosa announced his retirement after playing 15 seasons in the league. He became one of the team's assistant coaches and his #6 jersey was retired by Alaska during halftime of their 2003 season opener.

In the All-Filipino Cup, Alaska failed in its bid to enter the Finals as they were eliminated by Talk 'N Text in a grueling five-game series. However, the Aces won the third-place trophy via a blowout in expense of the San Miguel Beermen. In the Invitational tournament, Alaska had to play in the qualifying round to enter the tournament. The Aces swept the elimination round, winning all four of its games, to make it to the semis. In a one-game showdown, Alaska defeated Red Bull Barako to face Coca-Cola in the Finals. The Tigers won Game One of the series, but the Aces won the next two games to win their 11th PBA title, this time with a different set of players. Brandon Cablay was named as Finals MVP, while Ali Peek won Best Player of the Conference honors. In the Reinforced Conference, Alaska struggled in the tournament and was eliminated by Duremdes and Sta. Lucia in the quarters.

==== 2003–04 Fiesta Conference ====
Alaska paraded former NBA journeyman Galen Young for the 2004 Fiesta Conference. The Aces placed second after the elimination round of the tournament. But, they failed to enter the finals of the said tournament winning only one game in three outings in the semi-finals.

==== 2004–05 season ====
In the 2004–05 season, the Aces managed to finished fourth in the qualifying round. After eliminating FedEx in the Wild-Card phase, they were swept by San Miguel in the quarters. During the tournament, Arigo and Peek were shipped to Coca-Cola for Jeffrey Cariaso and Reynel Hugnatan. Bong Hawkins also made his return to the Aces, reuniting him with Cariaso, assistant coach Jojo Lastimosa, and Cone. Alaska hired Leon Derricks for the Fiesta Conference. However, his inconsistent game led to his replacement by former Chicago Bull Dickey Simpkins. The addition of Simpkins helped Alaska climb into third place at the end of the classification round. The Aces faced Red Bull Thunder in the semis. A back injury sustained by Simpkins, after being elbowed in the back by Dorian Peña, prevented him from playing at full strength during the series. Former Alaska player Bryan Gahol hit the last second shot in Game three to eliminate Alaska from the tournament.

==== 2005–06 season ====
Prior to the start of the 2005–06 PBA season, the Aces built up their lineup by acquiring national team pool members, Tony dela Cruz and Rich Alvarez from the disbanding Shell Turbo Chargers. They also acquired the services of former Mobiline and Coca-Cola import Artemus "Tee" McClary for the Fiesta Conference. After the Aces placed second behind Team Pilipinas in the Brunei Sultan's Cup, with Dela Cruz playing for the said team, the team was considered as one of the top contenders to win the upcoming season. However, they went on a slide after a good start. After Alaska blowing a 28-point lead and losing to the Purefoods Chunkee Giants, the team went on a downhill since. With McClary's decline starting to show, he was eventually replaced by the 3-point shooting Odell Bradley who showed some impressive scoring outputs. However, Alaska still finished seventh in the classification phase with a 7–9 record. The Aces swept Sta. Lucia in a best-of-three matchup in the wildcard phase before being swept in a best-of-five affair by eventual champion Red Bull Barako.

Weeks before the start of the Philippine Cup, Alaska traded Brandon Cablay to San Miguel in exchange for veteran Nic Belasco. On May 8, 2006, they traded Don Allado to Talk 'N Text for guard Willie Miller, forward John Ferriols, & a 2006 first round pick. Alaska finished with a 9–7 record in the classifications, thus earning an outright berth in the quarterfinals. In the quarterfinals, the Aces defeated the Coca-Cola Tigers, with former Alaska star Johnny Abarrientos on the squad, 3–1. The opening game of the series saw Alaska winning on a last second three-pointer by Nic Belasco. In the semi-finals against top-seed Purefoods Chunkee Giants, the Aces led 3–1 and was a win away from a finals berth but failed to win all of the remaining games. Alaska would end the tournament on a winning note, capturing the third-place trophy with a 102–95 win over San Miguel, their 12th third-place finish in team history.

==== 2006–07 season: Fiesta Conference Champions ====
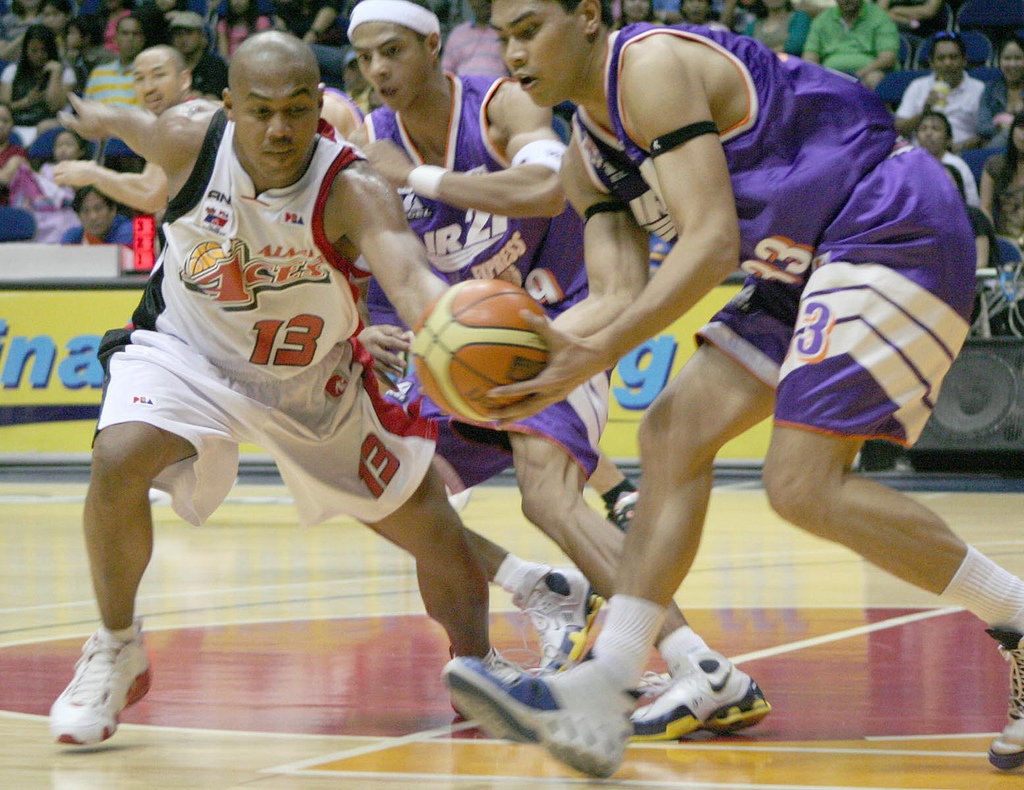
Willie Miller (#13) in 2007

Head coach Tim Cone signed a contract extension to remain with Alaska, erasing speculation of his possible dismissal. In the 2006 PBA Draft, Alaska selected Letran's Aaron Aban and UST's Christian Luanzon.

Alaska started the 2006–07 PBA Philippine Cup poorly but rebounded to finish with an 8–10 record for a wildcard berth. After losing in a last-second overtime thriller against Coca-Cola, and a win by Sta. Lucia on the next game date eliminated Alaska from contention despite winning their last game against Sta. Lucia.

Injuries to Reynel Hugnatan and Mike Cortez affected the team's play throughout the said conference.

However, Alaska started the 2007 PBA Fiesta Conference with a 7–4 card before the All-Star break, with Roselle Ellis as their import. Shooting Guard, Willie Miller provided a strong performance for the Aces during the tournament posting numerous 20 point-games.

The return of Cortez sparked a late surge by the team by finishing with a 12–6 record and beat Ginebra in a one-game playoff to earn an outright semifinals berth.

After eliminating the San Miguel Beermen in the semifinals via a 4–2 series win, the Aces entered the finals for a 19th time to meet the Talk 'N Text Phone Pals. Despite a 1–2 and a 2–3 deficit in the titular showdown, Miller, named the league's Most Valuable Player, erupted for 29 points to tie the series in Game 4 and recovered from a dismal performance in Game 5 with a sterling 37-point output in Game 6 to force a decider. The seventh game was a seesaw battle before Miller fired a go-ahead layup and a Reynel Hugnatan freethrow in the last two minutes to seal a 99–96 championship win for Alaska.

==== 2007–08 season ====
LA Tenorio in 2008

Alaska picked Adamson stalwart, Ken Bono, and University of Visayas Green Lancers starting center, JR "Baby Shaq" Quiñahan as the 6th and 7th overall picks of the 2007 PBA Draft along with second round selection Ardy Larong. In order to free up some cap spaces, the team traded veteran forward Nic Belasco to Welcoat in exchange for Junjun Cabatu while signing free agent Ariel Capus.

In the 2007–08 Philippine Cup, the Aces lost at the semis against Sta. Lucia.

Before the start of the Fiesta Conference, Alaska acquired former Blue Eagles LA Tenorio and Larry Fonacier in exchange for ace point guard Mike Cortez and 1st round draft pick Ken Bono. They also tapped former Chicago Bull and Talk 'N Text import Randy Holcomb as their reinforcement to help them defend the crown. Alaska, started slowly winning only 2 of their 6 matches including a 4-game losing streak. Then came a rumor that Holcomb would be replaced by former Milwaukee Buck Daniel Santiago. However, it was confirmed that the rumors were not true and they were not in negotiations with the Puerto Rico national team starting center. Alaska came on to a conference high 6-game winning streak and made their record to 8–6 and had a chance of getting a semi-final seat.

In their 2nd-round game against Magnolia, Alaska was trailing along the way until the final minute which they came in and even grabbed the lead, but Alaska's semi-final dream came to an end when a call by the referee with 0.3 seconds left caused them the game. Tied at 99 all, former Alaska Ace Mike Cortez split his freethrows to give Magnolia a one-point lead. However, Larry Fonacier's jumper went in front of the rim as time expired and Magnolia escaped with a nail-biting 100–99 win over the defending champions.

==== 2008–10 seasons: 13th title ====
In the 2008 Draft, Alaska drafted scoring guard Solomon Mercado at fifth in the first round and grabbing Mapúa star Kelvin dela Peña at fifteenth in the second round. A day after the draft, the team acquired 2007 first overall pick and team leading scorer Joe Devance from Rain or Shine (formerly Welcoat Dragons) in exchange for Mercado and wingman Eddie Laure.

On September 4, 2008, the team signed 2004 7th overall pick Ervin Sotto. While on September 22, 2008, Alaska traded Quiñahan to the Air21 Express in exchange for 2008 6th overall pick Mark Borboran. Meanwhile, the team also signed veteran 6–9 Eric Canlas through free agency.

The Aces started their campaign on their quest for their 4th All-Filipino crown on a high note including a 4–0 start. They struggled in the middle part of the conference but still remained the leader in the standings. Alaska finished as the number one team after the elimination round winning 12 games in 18 matches and was the first team to secure a seat in the Semifinals giving them a long rest. After three weeks of waiting, they faced the defending Philippine Cup champion Sta. Lucia Realtors, a re-match of last year's Semifinals which went to a seven-game grueling series. The Realtors swept the depleted-lineup of the Rain or Shine Elasto Painters in the Quarterfinals. The Aces beat the defending champion Realtors in six games to advance and arranged a Finals showdown with the Talk 'N Text Tropang Texters. They had a 2–0 lead first but Talk 'N Text tied the series 2–2. In Game 5, Alaska won 95–93 courtesy by Willie Miller's tough three-point shot. In Game 6, Talk 'N Text tied the series 3–3 to force a Game 7. In Game 7, they had a chance to win the title but the missed free throws during the crucial seconds of the game by Miller and Joe Devance gave Talk 'N Text the win and the title, 93–89.

In the 2009–10 Philippine Cup, Alaska started strong and finished in first place in the standings, earning them an automatic semi-final seat. Willie Miller led the Aces in scoring with LA Tenorio continued to blossom for the Aces. They swept Ginebra in the semi-finals and faced Purefoods for the championship, who defeated San Miguel in the semis. Despite their strong output during the eliminations, Purefoods swept them in the finals, including three straight game heart-breaking losses.

In the Fiesta Conference, Alaska paraded import Diamon Simpson. Simpson, who played for the Los Angeles D-Fenders, an NBA D-League team and affiliate of back-to-back NBA champion Los Angeles Lakers before coming to the PBA, was very impressive and fit perfectly into Tim Cone's Triangle System. He nearly averaged 30 points and 20 rebounds a game and made Alaska the favorites to win it all in the import-laden conference. In the middle of the conference, leading scorer Willie Miller was traded to the Barangay Ginebra Kings in exchange for high flyer Cyrus Baguio. It was stated by Miller's agent that Miller wanted out of Alaska before the season started. After the trade was approved and made, in a coincidence, Alaska's next game was against Ginebra. In that game, the Aces trailed most of the game until the fourth quarter, when Cyrus Baguio finally exploded for 14 points to lead Alaska to a come from behind win. The Aces put team captain Jeffrey Cariaso in the reserve list in what would have been his retirement but a few games later, Cariaso returned to play once more. Alaska also signed veteran guard Topex Robinson during the season.

Alaska met rival Talk N Text in the semi-finals. LA Tenorio was awarded as the Most Improved Player in the league. Former Alaska point guard Johnny Abarrientos announced his retirement after playing 15 seasons in the league. The Aces defeated the Tropang Texters in a grueling seven-game series despite being down 2–3. The Aces met top seed San Miguel Beermen led by best import Gabe Freeman in the finals. The Aces dominated the Beermen and won their 12th Championship in six games. LA Tenorio and Cyrus Baguio were named co-Finals MVPs of the series.

At the end of the season, Jeffrey Cariaso retired and Tony Dela Cruz was named the new captain of the team.

==== 2010–11 season: The franchise's 25th anniversary ====
Before the season began, the Aces celebrated their 25th anniversary as a PBA franchise on September 28, 2010. During the commemoration, they formally retired the jerseys of Bong Hawkins (#16) and Johnny Abarrientos (#14). Both players were instrumental for their grandslam finish in 1996. On draft day, they traded shooter Larry Fonacier to Talk 'N Text in exchange for the fourth overall pick which was used to pick former UE Warrior Elmer Espiritu. With Jeffrey Cariaso already retired, they traded their second pick in first round to Meralco for another former UE player Bonbon Custodio. They also drafted JRU's Marvin Hayes as #2 pick in the second round.

For the duration of the Philippine Cup, they sported their throwback early 1990s light uniform temporary replacing their current light jersey. They finished the conference with a 7–7 record. Thanks to Joe Devance's improved play, good enough for them to be qualified in the quarterfinals. However, they were defeated by Ginebra in a do-or-die five games series despite leading 2–0 and up by 20 in game 5.

In the 2011 Commissioner's Cup, they paraded former Chicago Bull Eddie Basden as their import. Before the conference started, the Aces played in Cebu for an Invitational Tournament that made them the champions in the said league. However, Basden failed to pass the height limit requirement for imports which was 6'4. They quickly replaced him with 2010 NBA D-League Slam Dunk Champion LD Williams. They also traded long time bruiser Reynel Hugnatan to Meralco for young guns Hans Thiele and Paolo Bugia, released Marvin Hayes and signed guard Don Dulay. Topex Robinson, who still has a live contract with Alaska, joined Tim Cone's crew as one of the assistant coaches of the team.

Before the start of the 2011 Governor's Cup, they traded rookie Elmer Espiritu to Air21 in exchange for swingman Wesley Gonzales. On May 27, 2011, Alaska was forced to let go of Joe Devance after the talented Fil-Am forward begged off. Team manager Joaqui Trillo, however, stressed Devance was guaranteed the maximum pay through the end of his current contract. They eventually decided to trade him to Air21 Express for Jay-R Reyes. On the next day, Commissioner Salud requested Air21 to add up another player or its 2011 first round pick as he finds the trade "uneven". The Express responded with the 2011 and 2012 second round picks making Salud nod in the deal. The Aces also signed PBA Veteran Aries Dimaunahan. In the third conference, they had a slow start, losing their first two games but quickly bounced back winning four of their last five games, thanks to import Jason Forte's hustle play. The team's improved play led by LA Tenorio and Cyrus Baguio plus newcomer Wesley Gonzales' "real game" started to pay off, and the Aces qualified to the step ladder semifinals. The Aces finished with 8 wins in 13 outings including the semifinals despite losing key players Cyrus Baguio and Wesley Gonzales to injuries. But due to the controversial quotient system, Alaska failed to enter the finals with Petron having the superior quotient despite with the same records with Ginebra and the Aces itself.

==== 2011–12 Tim Cone era ends; Joel Banal succeeds ====
The Aces released Paolo Bugia, Don Dulay and Mike Burtscher, while guard Aries Dimaunahan returned to Shopinas.com Clickers where his rights are based. In the 2011 PBA draft, Alaska picked former FEU main man and Smart-Gilas standout Mac Baracael at sixth overall in the first round. In the second round, the Aces have four picks and used it to get former Blue Eagle leading scorer Eric Salamat at the 13th, Fil-Am Julius Pasculado at the 14th, and big man Ariel Mepana at the 15th. The Aces also owned the 17th pick but decided to trade it to Meralco for its 2014 second round pick.

On September 1, 2011, Alaska team owner Wilfred Steven Uytengsu held a rare press conference announcing Tim Cone's departure as head coach of the Aces after spending 22 years at the helm with the team. He said that Cone left Alaska to seek opportunities outside of the organization. He was succeeded by his lead assistant Joel Banal, who inked a three-year deal to lead the team. In his first conference as the Aces' new tactician, the team struggled in the All-Filipino Cup and had one of their worst finishes in years, winning only three games out of fourteen outings. They recruited 6'10 Matt Haryasz out of Stanford University as their reinforcement for the Commissioner's Cup. However, Haryasz was replaced by returning import and Mexico national team member Adam Parada before the start of the conference. The Aces also signed swingman Niño Gelig to bolster their lineup. Gelig had been a former teammate of Cyrus Baguio and were known as the dynamic combo during their UST days in the UAAP as well as in the now-defunct PBL.

On April 16, 2012, Banal stepped down as coach. Alaska owner Wilfred Uytengsu appointed long-time assistant coach Luigi Trillo, son of the current PBA governor Joaqui Trillo to handle the team for the rest of the season. They also brought back Jason Forte as reinforcement in the Governor's Cup. They went on and finished 9th in the league winning only two of their nine outings. The Aces failed to enter the quarter-finals with the team having its worst finish in a season since it joined the league.

==== 2012–13 season: Arrival of Calvin Abueva; champions again ====
Having earned the second worst record the season before, Alaska was awarded with the second overall pick in the draft lottery. On August 19, 2012, at the PBA Rookie Draft, the Aces selected NCAA Season 87 MVP Calvin Abueva of the San Sebastian Stags as the second overall pick. As most of the analysts said that Abueva, who was monickered as "the Beast" due to his impressive basketball skills, had been the most talented player in the draft. Abueva leads the NCAA in points, rebounds and assists directory. While in the second round, the Aces snatched former UE Warrior point guard Raphy Reyes and swingman Karl Dehesa. They also retained head coach Luigi Trillo and hired Alex Compton, Louie Alas and reinstated Topex Robinson as assistant coaches. Leo Austria was supposed to join the Aces' coaching staff as well but focused first with his head coaching job at Adamson University, making him available for next year. Dickie Bachmann was promoted to assistant manager while Jojo Lastimosa was tasked to man the sports camp director post.

Two weeks after the draft, the Aces made another blockbuster deal involving four other teams. As a result, they sent point guard LA Tenorio to Ginebra and acquired JVee Casio, Dondon Hontiveros, and Ginebra's 2015 2nd Round Pick. They also signed second round draft pick Raphy Reyes to boost their back court and brought back veterans Nic Belasco and Eddie Laure, who helped the Aces win the championship last 2007. After the San Sebastian College-Recoletos Golden Stags bowed out at the hands of Letran Knights in the NCAA Final Four, Abueva signs with the Aces in a three-year max rookie deal.

The Aces managed to finish 5th in the standings with eight wins on fourteen meetings to qualify the quarterfinals. They swept 4th-seed Meralco Bolts, in two games and entered the semifinals to face defending champion Talk 'N Text. Many are surprised with the Aces' performance as they pushed the defending champions in six grueling games before losing.

In the Commissioner's Cup, Alaska tapped former University of Memphis Tiger Robert Dozier as their reinforcement. They also nabbed Aldrech Ramos from San Mig Coffee after trading Mac Baracael to Ginebra. Dozier fit perfectly well in the Aces' system and thanks to his brilliant performance plus support from local stars Cyrus Baguio, Sonny Thoss, JVee Casio, Calvin Abueva and sixth man Dondon Hontiveros, Alaska topped the standings with an 11–3 record at the end of the eliminations and gained twice to beat advantage in quarterfinal round. They beat Air21 in the quarterfinals to face San Mig Coffee in the semis, setting up an attempt to finally beat former Alaska long-time coach Tim Cone. San Mig won Game 1 on a Bowles game winner but Alaska regained the momentum as they won the last three games to advance to the Finals against Barangay Ginebra. They swept the Kings in three lopsided games to win the 2013 Commissioner's Cup trophy. This was the 14th championship for the Aces and the first one without their long-time coach, Tim Cone. Rob Dozier was the run-away Best Import of the Conference, while Sonny Thoss was minted the Finals MVP.

In the Governor's Cup, Alaska tapped former New Mexico State standout Wendell McKines as import. Though McKines was consistent in the tournament by averaging a 30 point-20-rebounds every game, Alaska struggled during the conference but was good enough to qualify in the Playoffs with four wins in nine outings. They faced San Mig Coffee, which has a twice-to-beat advantage. The Aces came back from a 15-point deficit in the first game to force a do-or-die match-up but lost in the second game, bowing out of the Governor's Cup. During the Finals, Alaska rookie Calvin Abueva was named the Rookie Of The Year and included in the PBA Mythical First Team. Guard Cyrus Baguio and Center Sonny Thoss was included in the Mythical Second Team while JVee Casio won the Sportsmanship Award.

On November 12, 2013, the PBA Press Corps awarded Luigi Trillo as the Coach of the Year for the 2012–13 Season beating Grand Slam coaches Norman Black of Talk N' Text and former Alaska head coach Tim Cone of the San Mig Coffee Mixers. Trillo steered Alaska from a lottery team in 2011–12 to a title contender last season. Rookie of the Year Calvin Abueva was named in the All-Rookie Team along with Petron Blaze Boosters' Junemar Fajardo, Meralco Bolts' Cliff Hodge, San Mig Coffee Mixers' Alex Mallari and hotshot Chris Tiu of the Rain or Shine Elasto Painters.

==== 2013–14 Season: Trillo Out, Compton In ====
Long-time Alaska Governor/Team Manager Joaqui Trillo announced his retirement effectively at the start of the 2013–14 PBA Season. Former Aces assistant coach Dickie Bachmann has been tapped as his replacement.

In the 2013 PBA Draft, Alaska used their 8th overall pick to select former Blue Eagle Ryan Buenafe, former FEU Tamaraw Chris "Ping" Exciminiano in the second round, and PBA D-League bigman Raymund Ilagan in the third round. The Aces traded their other second round pick to the Talk 'N Text Tropang Texters for a future second round pick as well. They also signed former ABL MVP Leo Avenido to bolster their lineup in the upcoming 2013–14 PBA Philippine Cup. The Aces managed to win 8 games in 14 outings and qualify for the playoffs as an eight seed and faced top-seeded Barangay Ginebra San Miguel, who has a twice-to-beat advantage. Alaska forced a do-or-die by taking Game 1 but fell short in Game 2, eliminating them in the process.

In the Commissioner's Cup, the Aces brought back reigning best import Robert Dozier, who helped Alaska snatch their 13th title the year before. They traded Aldrech Ramos to Air21 Express for bruiser Vic Manuel to beef up their frontline. The Aces had a 1–3 slow start but managed to win their remaining five games to earn the number 3 seed in the playoffs. They faced sixth seed San Mig Super Coffee Mixers in a best-of-three series. The Aces took Game 1 but lost Games 2 and 3 and again, they failed to enter the semifinals for the third straight conference.

Alaska tapped former NBA player Bill Walker, who suited up for the Boston Celtics and the New York Knicks as their reinforcement in the Governor's Cup. After splitting their first two games, Luigi Trillo stepped down as head coach of Alaska. Trillo, who was awarded as the PBA Coach of the Year in 2013, resigned because of "family reasons". With Trillo throwing the towel, team owner Wilfred Uytengsu appointed lead assistant Alex Compton as the team's new tactician. Alaska suffered its worst defeat in history, a 51-point deficit at the hands of the Rain or Shine Elasto Painters. Rumors sparkled that the team was being put on sale to newcomer NLEX Corp, who wanted to buy an existing franchise instead of starting from scratch. Team manager Dickie Bachmann shut down the rumors stating the team was "here to stay." Uytengsu also denied the rumors and stated that he was not selling the franchise with the second-most wins in the PBA. He called the reports as "silly and laughable". The following week, Alaska extended the contracts of main core players Cyrus Baguio, Sonny Thoss and JVee Casio for another three years. The Aces finished the conference with a 5–4 record making them the third seed and earning a twice-to-beat advantage in the playoffs. They eliminated crowd favorite Barangay Ginebra San Miguel in the quarterfinals, 92–81. The Aces entered the semifinals and faced the Rain or Shine Elasto Painters. Despite leading the series two games to one, the Aces lost the series in five grueling games and finished third place in the tournament.

==== 2014–15 Season: The birth of The Comeback Kids and #WeNotMe ====
In the 2014 PBA draft, Alaska used the 5th overall pick to select Filipino-Italian guard Chris Banchero, who led the San Miguel Beermen to a championship in the ABL, and in the second round, they drafted San Beda stalwart Rome dela Rosa. The Aces also traded two future second round picks to Global Port Batang Pier in exchange for former PBA MVP Eric Menk. In their preparations for the upcoming season, they hired Rob Beveridge, a well-known successful coach in the Australian Basketball League to improve the team's performance focusing on defense. After signing their rookies Banchero and Dela Rosa to their respective contracts, they also signed veteran swingman Josh Vanlandingham from the free agent market. They started the season 6–0 atop of the standings in the Philippine Cup but suffered their first loss at the hands of Barako Bull. After winning a road game against GlobalPort in Cagayan de Oro City, they were denied of an outright semi-finals berth after losing two crucial games against Barangay Ginebra and Rain or Shine, respectively. Yet, they still earn a twice-to-beat advantage in the Quarterfinals. After demolishing NLEX in their quarterfinal matchup, the Aces faced Meralco Bolts in the knockout phase and won the game in a blowout fashion to set a rematch with Rain or Shine Elasto Painters in a best-of-seven semi-finals series. They finished the series in six games to face San Miguel in the Finals for their 27th finals appearance. They battled the Beermen in seven gruelling games before eventually lost Game 7 by two points.

Alaska tapped D.J. Covington as their import for the Commissioner's Cup. After four games, he was replaced by Damion James. They also traded bruising forward Gabby Espinas to GlobalPort for defensive center Nonoy Baclao. Even with James as their reinforcement, the Aces could not come up with winning streaks, owing to injuries to key players Abueva, Casio, and Thoss. They recorded a 5–6 win loss record after the eliminations. Somehow, they punched a ticket to the Quarterfinals as the No. 6 seed after beating Barangay Ginebra in their last game, to set up a match with Purefoods, who eventually swept them in the Quarterfinal rounds.

In the Governors' Cup, the Aces acquired the services of Romeo Travis, LeBron James' childhood friend and high school teammate at St. Vincent-St. Mary. They won the first three games of the conference, but lost two of their next three games to Talk N'Text and NLEX, respectively. Since then, they won four straight to clinch the top spot in the elimination round with 8–3 win–loss record, although they dropped their last game to GlobalPort. They easily deposed Barangay Ginebra in the quarterfinal rounds to set up a semis showdown against Star Hotshots. They swept the Hotshots, 3–0 and earned a ticket to the Finals for their 28th finals appearance. They set up a rematch against San Miguel, who eventually swept them, 4–0.

==== 2015–18 seasons: Drive for 15th continues ====
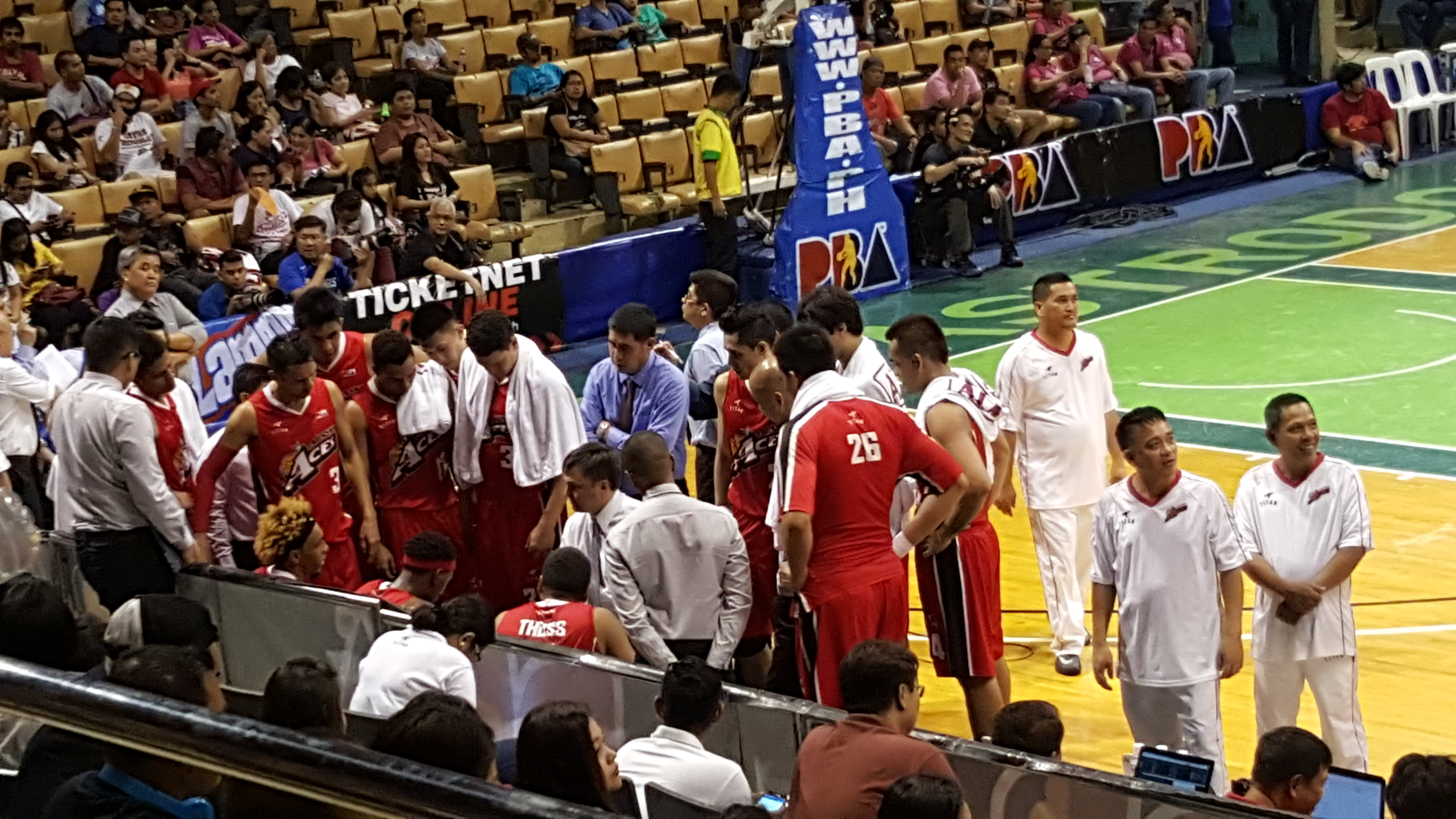
Alex Compton and the Aces during a timeout.

The Aces drafted Letran standout Kevin Racal with the 11th pick in the rookie draft, as well as big man Marion Magat and crafty guard Abel Galliguez. During the offseason, Alaska allowed Calvin Abueva, Sonny Thoss, Dondon Hontiveros and Coach Alex Compton join the Gilas Pilipinas 3.0 national team, who won silver medals in both the 2015 William Jones Cup and 2015 FIBA Asia Championship.

On November 12, 2015, The PBA franchise celebrated their 30th anniversary with the recognition night for the 30 greatest players in the team's history held in the Enderun College, Taguig.

Alaska was consistent all throughout the All-Filipino eliminations, thanks to their intact lineup, team play and suffocating defense, they won nine out of their eleven outings. The Aces earned the number one spot in the standings, hence, giving them an outright semifinals berth. Alaska faced the GlobalPort Batang Pier in the semi-finals. After losing the first game, the Aces won their next four outings to clinch the first seat in the 2015–16 PBA Philippine Cup Finals and set up last year's finals rematch against the San Miguel Beermen.

The Aces won the 1st 3 games of the series and was on the verge of winning the championship after leading by 11 points with less than 4 minutes remaining in the pivotal Game 4. From there the Aces would be denied the championship despite a 3–0 lead as the Beermen took the last four games and won the championship.

Alaska once again tapped former Best Import Robert Dozier for the Commissioner's Cup. However, Dozier got injured before the start of the season during practice. With their import sidelined by plantar fasciitis, backup reinforcement Shane Edwards filled in and provided good numbers and led the Aces to five wins in eight outings. Dozier returned three games before the end of the eliminations and the Aces finished third in the standings to qualify for the playoffs. Alaska beat Tropang TNT in the quarterfinals in a do-or-die best of three series. The Aces will look for a third consecutive PBA Finals trip as they face the Meralco Bolts in the semifinals. The Aces bested the Bolts in five grueling games to face the Rain or Shine Elasto Painters in the Finals. Alaska, hampered by injuries, missed the services of key players JVee Casio and Vic Manuel during the championship series. Despite being down by 0–3 in the finals, Alaska managed to forced the series in six games before losing their third consecutive finals.

The Aces tapped LaDontae Henton as their reinforcement for the Governor's Cup. Vic Manuel and JVee Casio returns for Alaska after healing off injuries. On July 14, 2016, after a six-year tenure with Alaska,Cyrus Baguio was traded to the Phoenix Fuel Masters for two second round picks. The Aces decided to trade Baguio due to the emergence of rookie Kevin Racal.

Alaska struggled at the start of the season winning only two matches in five outings even losing to an import-less team San Miguel but went on to a four-game winning streak. The team treated their final outings in the eliminations as "knock out games". On September 16, 2016, Banchero, again, extended his tenure with the Aces. This time, to a longer three-year deal. Terms were not disclosed. The Fil-Italian cager stated that it was an "easy decision" stating "he is very happy with Alaska." He credited the coaching staff and his teammates as the main reason he stayed with the team and hopes he will finish his career with Alaska. The Aces scored an important win in their last game of the eliminations in the season-ending conference to clinch the number six spot by beating the NLEX Road Warriors. Vic Manuel came back from his injury and contributed immediately and faced crowd darling Barangay Ginebra in the playoffs. However, the Aces failed to force a do-or-die game to advance in the semi-finals.

Alaska drafted former FEU bruiser and current Gilas Pilipinas pool member Carl Bryan Cruz during the 2016 PBA Special Draft. They started the 2016–17 PBA Philippine Cup with key players Sonny Thoss, Calvin Abueva and Noy Baclao in the injured list forcing Cruz, sophomore stretch player Jaypee Mendoza and Marion Magat playing at the center slot. Due to lack of size, the Aces lost their first two games and initiated a deal to send swing man Rome dela Rosa to Star Hotshots in exchange for former San Beda teammate big man Jake Pascual. Pascual immediately contributed to the team with his scrappy plays and defense and with Abueva and Manuel returning to top form, Alaska won its next three games. Despite finishing second in the standings and gaining a twice-to-beat advantage, the Aces, hampered by injuries, failed to enter the semi-finals when they lost two in a row to Barangay Ginebra.

In 2016–17, a week after their Philippine Cup campaign, Alaska traded back up point guard RJ Jazul to the Phoenix Fuel Masters in exchange for guard Simon Enciso.

In the 2018 Governor's Cup, they went up to the Finals, but lost to Magnolia Hotshots.

==== 2019–21 seasons: Sunset years ====
Midway through the 2019 season, at the end of the Commissioner's Cup, Compton stepped down as head coach, with Cariaso assuming the position.

On February 16, 2022, Alaska Milk Corporation (AMC) announced that the Alaska Aces will leave the PBA at the end of the 2021 Governors' Cup. This was due to a directive by FrieslandCampina, parent company of AMC. Alaska ended their last tournament with a loss to the NLEX Road Warriors in the quarterfinals. Immediately following their last game on March 19, 2022, a brief ceremony was held to mark the Alaska's departure from the PBA.

== Franchise's sale to Converge ICT ==
Several companies expressed interest to buy the Aces' franchise. This included Universal Canning, Inc. and Converge ICT which is associated to businessman Dennis Anthony Uy (not to be confused and also not related with namesake Dennis Uy who owned the Phoenix Super LPG Fuel Masters).

On March 23, 2022, the PBA announced the sale of the franchise to Converge ICT lock, stock and barrel with unanimous approval by the leagues' Board of Governors.

Converge retained the core of the Alaska Aces team (including the coaching staff) as part of the sale of the franchise within the ongoing season.

In the event the franchise was not sold within the ongoing season, the PBA would have placed the players in a dispersal draft.

== Mascot ==
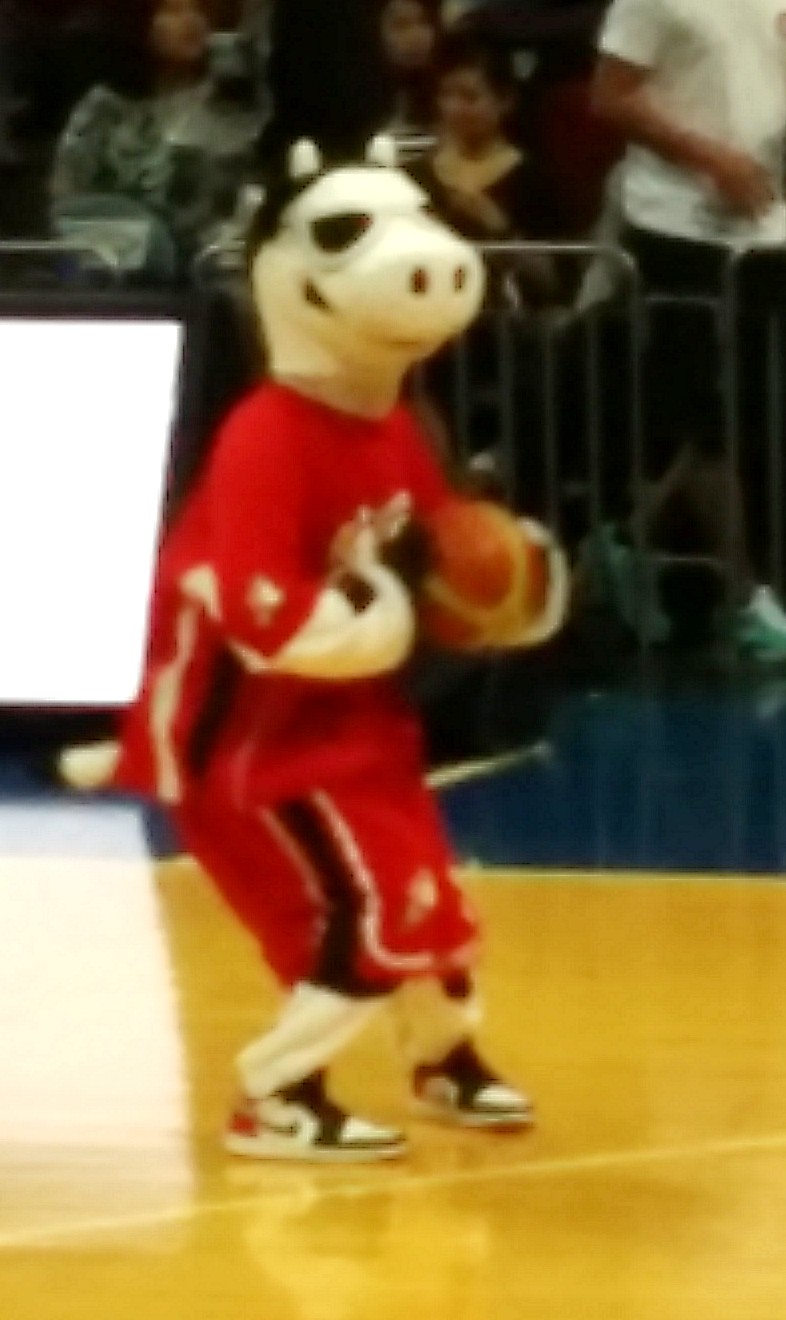
E. Cow doing a shootaround during the halftime break of the Aces' game against Barangay Ginebra.

E. Cow was the main mascot of the Alaska Aces. He was first introduced during the mid-1990s and was the longest tenured PBA mascot. His image was also used for Alaska Milk advertisements.

== Final roster ==
Alaska Aces roster
Players
Coaches

Pos.	#	POB	Name	Height	Weight	DOB (YYYY–MM–DD)	From
G	0	(Philippines)	RK Ilagan (R)	5 ft 7 in (1.70 m)	150 lb (68 kg)	1997–04–03	San Sebastian
G/F	1	(United States)	Robbie Herndon	6 ft 3 in (1.91 m)	180 lb (82 kg)	1993–07–16	San Francisco State
F/C	2	(Philippines)	Abu Tratter	6 ft 5 in (1.96 m)	215 lb (98 kg)	1993–01–09	De La Salle
G	3	(United States)	Michael DiGregorio	6 ft 1 in (1.85 m)	185 lb (84 kg)	1991–12–12	McKendree
G/F	5	(Canada)	Taylor Browne (R)	6 ft 3 in (1.91 m)	185 lb (84 kg)	1997–01–30	UBC
G	12	(United States)	Alec Stockton (R)	6 ft 2 in (1.88 m)	170 lb (77 kg)	1998–06–24	Far Eastern
G	13	(United States)	Maverick Ahanmisi	6 ft 2 in (1.88 m)	185 lb (84 kg)	1991–07–17	Minnesota
F/C	18	(Philippines)	Ben Adamos (R)	6 ft 7 in (2.01 m)	200 lb (91 kg)	1995–12–30	UPHSD
G	19	(Philippines)	Jaycee Marcelino	5 ft 9 in (1.75 m)		1995–10–19	Lyceum
G/F	21	(Philippines)	Jeron Teng (C)	6 ft 2 in (1.88 m)	185 lb (84 kg)	1994–03–21	De La Salle
G	24	(Philippines)	Mike Tolomia	5 ft 11 in (1.80 m)	170 lb (77 kg)	1993–01–06	Far Eastern
G	28	(Philippines)	Allyn Bulanadi (R)	6 ft 0 in (1.83 m)		1997–04–28	San Sebastian
F	31	(Philippines)	Rey Publico	6 ft 4 in (1.93 m)		1992–11–29	Letran
C	55	(Palestine)	Yousef Taha	6 ft 8 in (2.03 m)	231 lb (105 kg)	1988–07–08	Mapúa
F	61	(Philippines)	Kevin Racal	6 ft 3 in (1.91 m)	175 lb (79 kg)	1991–05–16	Letran
F/C	96	(Philippines)	Bryan Faundo	6 ft 6 in (1.98 m)	225 lb (102 kg)	1984–02–18	Letran

Head coach

- (United States) Jeffrey Cariaso

Assistant coach(es)

- (Philippines) Joe Silva (1st assistant)
- (Philippines) Danny Ildefonso
- (Philippines) Franco Atienza
- (Philippines) Monch Gavieres

Team manager

- (Philippines) Dickie Bachmann^{[a]}

Legend

- (C) Team captain
- (CI) Commissioner's Cup Import
- (GI) Governors' Cup Import
- (EI) EASL Import
- (DP) Unsigned draft pick
- (FA) Free agent
- (IN) Inactive
- (S) Suspended
- (R) Rookie
- Injured

Roster

- ^{a} also serves as Alaska's board governor.

== Season-by-season records ==
Records from the 2021 PBA season:

Conf.	Team name	Elimination round				Playoffs	
Conf.	Team name	Finish	W	L	PCT	Stage	Results
PHI	Alaska Aces	11th/12	3	8	.273	Did not qualify	
GOV	Alaska Aces	7th/12	6	5	.545	Quarterfinals	NLEX** def. Alaska in 2 games
Total elimination round			9	13	.409	0 Semifinals appearance	
Total playoffs			1	1	.500	0 Finals appearance	
Total 2021			10	14	.417	0 Championships	
Total franchise			997	831	.545	14 Championships	

*one-game playoffs
**team had the twice-to-beat advantage

== Awards ==
=== Individual awards ===
PBA Most Valuable Player	Finals MVP	PBA Best Player of the Conference
Johnny Abarrientos - 1996; Kenneth Duremdes - 1998; Willie Miller - 2006-07	Jojo Lastimosa - 1996 All-Filipino; Bong Hawkins - 1996 Commissioner's; Johnny Abarrientos - 1996 Governors', 1997 Governors'; Kenneth Duremdes - 1998 All-Filipino, 1998 Commissioner's; Poch Juinio - 2000 All-Filipino; Brandon Cablay - 2003 Invitational; Willie Miller - 2006-07 Fiesta; LA Tenorio & Cyrus Baguio - 2009-10 Fiesta; Sonny Thoss - 2012-13 Commissioner's	Bong Hawkins - 1996 Commissioner's; Johnny Abarrientos - 1997 Commissioner's; Kenneth Duremdes - 1998 Commissioner's, 2000 All-Filipino; Ali Peek - 2003 Invitational; Willie Miller - 2008-09 Philippine; Calvin Abueva - 2015-16 Commissioner's
PBA Rookie of the Year Award	PBA All-Defensive Team	PBA Mythical First Team
Eugene Quilban - 1991; Jeffrey Cariaso - 1995; Calvin Abueva - 2012-13	Ricky Relosa - 1986-1988; Elpidio Villamin - 1987-1990; Biboy Ravanes - 1988, 1991; Johnny Abarrientos - 1994, 1996–1997, 1999; Bong Hawkins - 1994; Jeffrey Cariaso - 1996-1997; Nic Belasco - 2005-06; Sonny Thoss - 2012-13; Chris Exciminiano - 2014-16; Calvin Abueva - 2014-15	Elpidio Villamin - 1987; Paul Alvarez - 1990; Jojo Lastimosa - 1991, 1996, 1998; Johnny Abarrientos - 1994-1999; Bong Hawkins - 1995-1996; Kenneth Duremdes - 1998, 2000; Ali Peek - 2001; Don Allado - 2002; Willie Miller - 2006-07; LA Tenorio - 2009-10; Sonny Thoss - 2009-11; Calvin Abueva - 2012–13, 2015–16
PBA Mythical Second Team	PBA Most Improved Player	PBA Sportsmanship Award
Ricky Relosa - 1987; Elpidio Villamin - 1988, 1990; Paul Alvarez - 1989; Bong Hawkins - 1994, 2000; Jojo Lastimosa - 1995, 1999; Jeffrey Cariaso - 1996; Kenneth Duremdes - 1999, 2001; John Arigo - 2003; Don Allado - 2003; Mike Cortez - 2005-06; Willie Miller - 2007-09; Sonny Thoss - 2007–08, 2011–14; Joe Devance - 2009-10; Cyrus Baguio - 2012-13; Calvin Abueva - 2014-15	Ricky Relosa - 1986; Elpidio Villamin - 1987; Bong Hawkins - 1994; Poch Juinio - 1996; Rob Duat - 2002; LA Tenorio - 2009-10	Tony Dela Cruz - 2005-06; Cyrus Baguio - 2009-10; Sonny Thoss - 2010-11; JVee Casio - 2011-13
PBA Best Import		
Sean Chambers - 1996 Governors'; Devin Davis - 1998 Commissioner's; Rosell Ellis - 2006-07 Fiesta; Robert Dozier - 2012-13 Commissioner's; Romeo Travis - 2014-15 Governors'; Mike Harris - 2017-18 Governors'		

=== PBA Press Corps Individual Awards ===
Executive of the Year	Baby Dalupan Coach of the Year	Defensive Player of the Year
Wilfred Uytengsu - 1998, 2009–10	Tim Cone - 1994, 1996; Luigi Trillo - 2012-13	
Bogs Adornado Comeback Player of the Year	Mr. Quality Minutes	All-Rookie Team
	Merwin Castelo - 1994; Jun Reyes - 1996; Rodney Santos - 1998-1999; Calvin Abueva - 2014-15; Vic Manuel - 2017-18	Sonny Thoss - 2004-05; Calvin Abueva - 2012-13; Chris Banchero - 2014-15; Jeron Teng - 2017-18; Abu Tratter - 2019; Barkley Eboña - 2020

=== All-Star Weekend ===
All Star MVP	Obstacle Challenge	Three-point Shootout	Slam Dunk Contest	All-Star Selection
Elmer Cabahug - 1989; Willie Miller - 2007	Rodney Santos - 1999; Willie Miller - 2007-2008	Rhoel Gomez- 1997	Brandon Cablay - 2003	1989: Paul Alvarez; Elmer Cabahug; Elpidio Villamin; 1990: Paul Alvarez; Elmer Cabahug; Ric-Ric Marata; 1991: Jojo Lastimosa; 1992: Paul Alvarez; Jojo Lastimosa; 1993: Bobby Jose; Jojo Lastimosa; 1994: Johnny Abarrientos; Bong Hawkins; Jojo Lastimosa; 1995: Johnny Abarrientos; Jeffrey Cariaso; Bong Hawkins; 1996: Johnny Abarrientos; Jeffrey Cariaso; Bong Hawkins; Jojo Lastimosa; 1997: Johnny Abarrientos; 1998: Devin Davis (import); 1999: Johnny Abarrientos; 2000: Johnny Abarrientos; Kenneth Duremdes; Bong Hawkins; Rodney Santos; 2001: Don Allado; John Arigo; Kenneth Duremdes; Ali Peek; 2003: Don Allado; John Arigo; Mike Cortez; 2004: Ali Peek; Sonny Thoss; 2005: Rich Alvarez; Jeffrey Cariaso; Tony dela Cruz; Reynel Hugnatan; Sonny Thoss; 2006: Nic Belasco; Willie Miller; Reynel Hugnatan; 2007: Tony dela Cruz; Willie Miller; Sonny Thoss; 2008: John Ferriols; Reynel Hugnatan; Willie Miller; Sonny Thoss; 2009: Rosell Ellis (import); John Ferriols; Reynel Hugnatan; Willie Miller; LA Tenorio; Sonny Thoss; 2010: Cyrus Baguio; Joe Devance; Reynel Hugnatan; Sonny Thoss; 2011: Cyrus Baguio; Joe Devance; LA Tenorio; Sonny Thoss; 2012: Mac Baracael; LA Tenorio; Sonny Thoss; 2013: Calvin Abueva; Cyrus Baguio; JVee Casio; Sonny Thoss; 2014: Calvin Abueva; Sonny Thoss; 2015: Calvin Abueva; Cyrus Baguio; Dondon Hontiveros; 2016: Calvin Abueva; 2017: Calvin Abueva; Carl Bryan Cruz; Dondon Hontiveros; Sonny Thoss; 2018: Calvin Abueva; Carl Bryan Cruz (did not play); Sonny Thoss; 2019: Chris Banchero

== Notable players ==
=== Members of the PBA's 25 greatest players ===
- Johnny Abarrientos – "The Flying A" played for team from 1993 to 2000; led Alaska to numerous PBA titles and was the 1996 PBA Most Valuable Player
- Bogs Adornado – played for Hills Bros. in the 1987 season; became the team's head coach after his retirement
- Kenneth Duremdes – "Captain Marbel" played for the team from 1998 to 2003; led Alaska to four PBA titles and was the 1998 PBA Most Valuable Player
- Abet Guidaben – played for the team from 1989 to 1990 before being traded to Pepsi for Harmon Codiñera.
- Jojo Lastimosa – "The 4th Quarter Man" "Mr.Clutch" "The Helicopter" led Alaska to nine PBA titles and was named to numerous Mythical Team selections,10-time PBA All-Star,1988 PBA Rookie of the Year and 1996 PBA All Filipino Cup Finals MVP.

=== Alaska Aces 30 greatest players ===
On November 12, 2015, the Alaska Aces celebrated its 30th anniversary.

- Johnny Abarrientos
- Calvin Abueva
- Paul Alvarez
- Cyrus Baguio
- Boy Cabahug
- Jeffrey Cariaso
- JV Casio
- Sean Chambers
- Mike Cortez
- Devin Davis
- Tony Dela Cruz
- Robert Dozier
- Kenneth Duremdes
- Rosell Ellis
- Bong Hawkins
- Dondon Hontiveros
- Reynel Hugnatan
- Poch Juinio
- Jojo Lastimosa
- Rey Lazaro
- Ric-Ric Marata
- Willie Miller
- Willie Pearson
- Ali Peek
- Eugene Quilban
- Biboy Ravanes
- Rodney Santos
- Diamon Simpson
- LA Tenorio
- Sonny Thoss
- Yoyoy Villamin

=== MVP awardee while still with the team ===
- Johnny Abarrientos – 1996
- Kenneth Duremdes – 1998
- Willie Miller – 2007

=== ROY awardee while still with the team ===
- Eugene Quilban – 1991
- Jeffrey Cariaso – 1995
- Calvin Abueva – 2013

=== Team captains ===
- Frankie Lim (1986–1987)
- William "Bogs" Adornado (1987–1988)
- Yoyoy Villamin (1988–1991)
- Jojo Lastimosa (1991–1999)
- Johnny Abarrientos (1993–2001)
- Kenneth Duremdes (2001–2003)
- John Arigo (2003–2004)
- Jeffrey Cariaso (2004–2010)
- Tony dela Cruz (2010–2016)
- Dondon Hontiveros (2013–2016, co-captain with Tony Dela Cruz)
- Calvin Abueva (2016–2018, co-captain with JVee Casio and RJ Jazul before Jazul left the team in 2017)
- RJ Jazul (2016–2017, was co-captain with JVee Casio and Calvin Abueva)
- JVee Casio (2016–2021)
- Jeron Teng (2021–2022)

=== Retired numbers ===
Alaska Aces retired numbers
N°	Player	Position	Tenure
6	Jojo Lastimosa	G	1991–2000; 2002–2003^{[a]}
7	Sonny Thoss	C	2004–2019^{[b]}
14	Johnny Abarrientos	G	1993–2001^{[c]}
16	Bong Hawkins	F	1993–2000; 2005–2006^{[c]}
20	Sean Chambers	F	1990–2001^{[d]}
22	Jeffrey Cariaso	G	1995–1997; 2004–2010^{[e]}
33	William "Bogs" Adornado	G	1987–1988^{[f]}

Alaska Aces honored numbers
N°	Player	Position	Tenure
30	Eric Menk	C	2014 – 2016 ^{[g]}
35	Tony dela Cruz	F	2005 – 2017 ^{[8]}

- ^{a} – retired during the opening of the 2003 season
- ^{b} – retired during halftime of the 2021 PBA Governors' Cup
- ^{c} – retired during the Alaska 25th anniversary reunion last September 27, 2010
- ^{d} – retired after Chambers announced his retirement in the 2001 Governor's Cup
- ^{e} – retired during the semifinals of the 2010 PBA Fiesta Conference
- ^{f} – retired during the opening ceremonies of the 1988 PBA season
- ^{g} – honored during halftime of the 2017 PBA Commissioner's Cup
- ^{h} – honored during halftime of the 2018 PBA Commissioner's Cup

== Coaches ==
- Tony Vasquez (1986)
- Cesar Jota (1986)
- Nat Canson (1987)
- Turo Valenzona (1987–1988)
- Bogs Adornado (1988–1989)
- Tim Cone (1989–2011)
- Joel Banal (2011–2012)
- Luigi Trillo (2012–2014)
- Alex Compton (2014–2019)
- Jeffrey Cariaso (2019–2022)

Preceded by (start)	PBA teams genealogies 1986−2022	Succeeded by Converge FiberXers

Awards and achievements
Preceded by Purefoods T.J. Hotdogs	PBA Third Conference Champions; 1991	Succeeded by Swift Mighty Meaties
Preceded by San Miguel Beermen	PBA Governors Cup Champions; 1994–1997	Succeeded by Formula Shell Zoom Masters
Preceded by Sunkist Orange Juicers; Purefoods Carne Norte Cowboys; Formula Shell Zoom Masters	PBA All-Filipino Cup Champions; 1996; 1998; 2000	Succeeded by Purefoods Corned Beef Cowboys; Shell Velocity; San Miguel Beermen
Preceded by Sunkist Orange Juicers; Gordon's Gin Boars; B-Meg Llamados	PBA Commissioner's Cup Champions; 1996; 1998; 2013	Succeeded by Gordon's Gin Boars; San Miguel Beermen; San Mig Super Coffee Mixers
Preceded by San Miguel Beermen (1989)	Grand Slam winners 1996	Succeeded by San Mig Super Coffee Mixers (2013–14)
Preceded by Great Taste Coffee Makers (1984)	PBA Invitational Conference Champions; 2003	Succeeded by (last)
Preceded by Red Bull Barako; San Miguel Beermen	PBA Fiesta Conference Champions; 2007; 2010	Succeeded by Barangay Ginebra Kings (last)
