= Robert Dozier =

American basketball player (born 1985)

Personal information
- Born: November 6, 1985 (age 40) Lithonia, Georgia, U.S.
- Listed height: 6 ft 9 in (2.06 m)
- Listed weight: 215 lb (98 kg)

Career information
- High school: Lithonia (Lithonia, Georgia); Laurinburg Institute (Laurinburg, North Carolina)
- College: Memphis (2005–2009)
- NBA draft: 2009: 2nd round, 60th overall pick
- Drafted by: Miami Heat
- Playing career: 2009–2022
- Position: Power forward

Career history
- 2009–2010: Kolossos Rhodes
- 2010–2011: PAOK Thessaloniki
- 2011–2012: Cholet Basket
- 2012–2013: Cajasol Sevilla
- 2013–2014: Alaska Aces
- 2014–2015: Al Shabab Dubai
- 2015: Le Mans Sarthe Basket
- 2016: Alaska Aces
- 2016–2018: San-en NeoPhoenix
- 2019: Phoenix Pulse Fuel Masters
- 2019–2020: San-en NeoPhoenix
- 2020–2021: Iwate Big Bulls
- 2021: Nagoya Diamond Dolphins
- 2022: Altiri Chiba

Career highlights
- PBA champion (2013 Commissioners'); Bobby Parks PBA Best Import of the Conference Award (2013 Commissioners')
- Stats at Basketball Reference

Robert Lorenzo Dozier Jr. (born November 6, 1985) is an American former professional basketball player.

== College career ==
In the 2007–08 season, Dozier started in all games with Memphis, along with the Memphis Tigers' future NBA players Derrick Rose, Chris Douglas-Roberts, Joey Dorsey, and Antonio Anderson. He was a key part in the Tigers' 2008 success, which ended in a loss to the Kansas Jayhawks in the championship game of the 2008 NCAA Tournament.

== Professional career ==
Dozier was the last player drafted in the 2009 NBA draft, selected 60th overall pick by the Miami Heat. He then signed a contract with the Greek League club Colossus Rhodes. In November 2010 he signed with PAOK B.C. In July 2011 he signed a one-year contract with Cholet Basket.

Dozier played for the Miami Heat in the 2012 NBA Summer League.

Dozier signed with the Miami Heat on September 27, 2012, but was waived by the team on October 21. Three weeks later, on November 7, he signed a one-month contract by Spanish squad Cajasol.

Dozier joined the Alaska Aces as its designated "import player" for the 2013 Commissioner's Cup season in the Philippine Basketball Association (PBA). Providing size and rebounding relief, he spurred an impressive postseason run for the Aces which culminated in a 3-game Finals sweep of the Barangay Ginebra Kings for the 2013 Commissioner's Cup Title. During Games 1 and 2 of the Finals, Dozier collected 42 combined rebounds and posted a game-high 27 points in the clincher while outdueling fellow American import Vernon Macklin in the championship round. He was named Best Import of Commissioners Cup on Game 3. He came back on the league for the same team at 2014 PBA Commissioner's Cup but they failed to defend their title.

In October 2014, Dozier signed with Al Shabab Dubai of United Arab Emirates for the 2014–15 season.

On October 23, 2015, Dozier signed with Le Mans Sarthe Basket of the French LNB Pro A. On December 28, he left Le Mans. On January 2, 2016, Dozier signed again with Alaska Aces as the team's import for the 2016 PBA Commissioner's Cup.

In August 2016, Dozier signed with SAN-EN NeoPhoenix of the Japanese B.League.

== See also ==
- List of NCAA Division I men's basketball players with 145 games played
