= 2016–17 Barangay Ginebra San Miguel season =

- Head coach: Tim Cone
- Owners: Ginebra San Miguel, Inc. (a San Miguel Corporation subsidiary)

Philippine Cup results
- Record: 6–5 (54.5%)
- Place: 7th
- Playoff finish: Runner-up (lost to San Miguel, 1–4)

Commissioner's Cup results
- Record: 9–2 (81.8%)
- Place: 1st
- Playoff finish: Semifinalist (lost to TNT, 1–3)

Governors' Cup results
- Record: 8–3 (72.7%)
- Place: 3rd
- Playoff finish: Champions (Defeated Meralco, 4–3)

Barangay Ginebra San Miguel seasons

The 2016–17 Barangay Ginebra San Miguel season was the 38th season of the franchise in the Philippine Basketball Association (PBA).

== Key dates ==
=== 2016 ===
- October 30: The 2016 PBA draft took place at Midtown Atrium, Robinson Place Manila.

== Draft picks ==
=== Special draft ===
Player	Position	Nationality	PBA D-League team	College
Kevin Ferrer	F	Philippines	Tanduay Light Rhum Masters	UST

=== Regular draft ===
Round	Pick	Player	Position	Nationality	PBA D-League team	College
2	3	Jammer Jamito	F	Philippines	AMA Online Education Titans	Saint Clare
2	9	Jericho De Guzman	C	Philippines	Z.C. Mindanao Aguilas	DLS-Benilde

== Roster ==
2016–17 Barangay Ginebra San Miguel roster
Players
Coaches

Pos.	#	POB	Name	Height	Weight	DOB (YYYY–MM–DD)	From
G/F	0	(Philippines)	Paolo Taha	6 ft 0 in (1.83 m)	180 lb (82 kg)	1990–12–05	St. Benilde
G	3	(United States)	Sol Mercado	6 ft 1 in (1.85 m)	200 lb (91 kg)	1984–05–06	Biola
G	5	(Philippines)	LA Tenorio	5 ft 8 in (1.73 m)	151 lb (68 kg)	1984–07–09	Ateneo
G	6	(Philippines)	Scottie Thompson	6 ft 1 in (1.85 m)	180 lb (82 kg)	1993–07–12	UPHSD
G	13	(Philippines)	Jayjay Helterbrand	5 ft 11 in (1.80 m)	170 lb (77 kg)	1976–10–14	Kentucky State
F	14	(Philippines)	Kevin Ferrer (R)	6 ft 4 in (1.93 m)	188 lb (85 kg)	1993–03–26	UST
C	15	(Philippines)	Jericho de Guzman (R)	6 ft 11 in (2.11 m)	245 lb (111 kg)	1989–10–19	St. Benilde
F	18	(Philippines)	Jammer Jamito (R)	6 ft 5 in (1.96 m)	190 lb (86 kg)	1990–09–01	St. Clare
C	20	(United States)	Greg Slaughter	7 ft 0 in (2.13 m)	258 lb (117 kg)	1988–05–19	Ateneo
F/C	23	(Philippines)	Raymond Aguilar	6 ft 5 in (1.96 m)	200 lb (91 kg)	1985–07–27	National-U
F/C	25	(Philippines)	Japeth Aguilar	6 ft 9 in (2.06 m)	235 lb (107 kg)	1987–01–25	Western Kentucky
F	27	(Philippines)	Jervy Cruz	6 ft 4 in (1.93 m)	220 lb (100 kg)	1986–09–09	UST
F	31	(Philippines)	Aljon Mariano	6 ft 3 in (1.91 m)	175 lb (79 kg)	1992–08–03	UST
F	38	(United States)	Joe Devance	6 ft 7 in (2.01 m)	225 lb (102 kg)	1982–02–19	UTEP
G	47	(Philippines)	Mark Caguioa (C)	6 ft 1 in (1.85 m)	185 lb (84 kg)	1979–11–19	Glendale CC (CA)
F	32	(United States)	Justin Brownlee (CI / GI)	6 ft 6 in (1.98 m)	220 lb (100 kg)	1988–04–23	St. John's
F	–	(Philippines)	Arthur dela Cruz (injured)	6 ft 4 in (1.93 m)	210 lb (95 kg)	1992–05–09	San Beda

Head coach

- (United States) Tim Cone

Assistant coach(es)

- (Philippines) Richard del Rosario (1st Assistant)
- (Philippines) Olsen Racela
- (Philippines) Freddie Abuda

Team manager

- (Philippines) Alfrancis Chua^{[a]}
- (Philippines) Raymond Rodriguez (Assistant)

Legend

- (C) Team captain
- (CI) Commissioner's Cup Import
- (GI) Governors' Cup Import
- (EI) EASL Import
- (DP) Unsigned draft pick
- (FA) Free agent
- (IN) Inactive
- (S) Suspended
- (R) Rookie
- Injured

Roster

- ^{a} Chua also serves as Barangay Ginebra's board governor.

== Philippine Cup ==
=== Eliminations ===
==== Standings ====
Pos	Team	W	L	PCT	GB	Qualification
1	San Miguel Beermen	10	1	.909	—	Twice-to-beat in the quarterfinals
2	Alaska Aces	7	4	.636 (Note: Head-to-head record: Alaska 1–0 Star)	3	Twice-to-beat in the quarterfinals
3	Star Hotshots	7	4	.636	3	Best-of-three quarterfinals
4	TNT KaTropa	6	5	.545 (Note: Head-to-head quotient: TNT 1.09, GlobalPort 1.00, Phoenix 0.96, Barangay Ginebra 0.94.)	4	Best-of-three quarterfinals
5	GlobalPort Batang Pier	6	5	.545	4	Best-of-three quarterfinals
6	Phoenix Fuel Masters	6	5	.545	4	Best-of-three quarterfinals
7	Barangay Ginebra San Miguel	6	5	.545	4	Twice-to-win in the quarterfinals
8	Rain or Shine Elasto Painters	5	6	.455 (Note: Eighth seed playoff: Rain or Shine 103–80 Blackwater)	5	Twice-to-win in the quarterfinals
9	Blackwater Elite	5	6	.455	5	
10	Mahindra Floodbuster	3	8	.273 (Note: Head-to-head record: Mahindra 1–0 Meralco)	7	
11	Meralco Bolts	3	8	.273	7	
12	NLEX Road Warriors	2	9	.182	8	

Source: PBA.ph

==== Game log ====
2016–17 PBA Philippine Cup game log
Total: 6–5
November: 0–1

Game	Date	Opponent	Score	High points	High rebounds	High assists	Location Attendance	Record
1	November 27	TNT	L 103–108	LA Tenorio (27)	Scottie Thompson (8)	Joe Devance (9)	Smart Araneta Coliseum	0–1

December: 3–2

Game	Date	Opponent	Score	High points	High rebounds	High assists	Location Attendance	Record
2	December 4	Rain or Shine	W 81–74	Japeth Aguilar (23)	Japeth Aguilar (13)	Scottie Thompson (7)	Smart Araneta Coliseum	1–1
3	December 11	GlobalPort	L 84–91	J. Aguilar, Tenorio (23)	Scottie Thompson (10)	LA Tenorio (8)	Smart Araneta Coliseum	1–2
4	December 16	Mahindra	W 89–70	Japeth Aguilar (15)	Japeth Aguilar (12)	Devance, Mercado, Thompson (5)	Smart Araneta Coliseum	2–2
5	December 18	Alaska	L 86–101	Kevin Ferrer (19)	Cruz, Thompson (7)	J. Aguilar, Mercado, Tenorio (3)	Smart Araneta Coliseum	2–3
6	December 25	Star	W 86–79	Japeth Aguilar (32)	Scottie Thompson (17)	Scottie Thompson (7)	Philippine Arena	3–3

January: 3–2

Game	Date	Opponent	Score	High points	High rebounds	High assists	Location Attendance	Record
7	January 8	San Miguel	L 70–72	Japeth Aguilar (17)	Japeth Aguilar (11)	LA Tenorio (4)	Smart Araneta Coliseum	3–4
8	January 14	Meralco	W 83–72	Joe Devance (19)	Scottie Thompson (16)	Scottie Thompson (7)	University of San Agustin Gym	4–4
9	January 20	Blackwater	W 99–90	Jervy Cruz (16)	Scottie Thompson (15)	Devance, Thompson (7)	Cuneta Astrodome	5–4
10	January 22	Phoenix	L 73–79	Caguioa, Tenorio (15)	Joe Devance (9)	four players (2)	PhilSports Arena	5–5
11	January 29	NLEX	W 90–80	LA Tenorio (30)	J. Aguilar, Tenorio (9)	Scottie Thompson (9)	Cuneta Astrodome	6–5

2016–17 schedule

=== Playoffs ===
==== Bracket ====
Quarterfinals
(#1 twice-to-beat)
1	San Miguel	98
8	Rain or Shine	91
(Best-of-3)
4	TNT	2
5	GlobalPort	0
(#2 twice-to-beat)
2	Alaska	81	97
7	Barangay Ginebra	85	108
(Best-of-3)
3	Star	2
6	Phoenix	0

Semifinals (Best-of-7)
1	San Miguel	4
4	TNT	3
7	Barangay Ginebra	4
3	Star	3

Finals (Best-of-7)
1	San Miguel	4
7	Barangay Ginebra	1

==== Game log ====
2017 PBA Philippine Cup playoffs game log
Total: 7–7
Quarterfinals: 2–0

Game	Date	Opponent	Score	High points	High rebounds	High assists	Location Attendance	Series
1	February 5	Alaska	W 85–81	LA Tenorio (16)	Japeth Aguilar (14)	Mercado, Tenorio (6)	Ynares Center	1–0
2	February 7	Alaska	W 108–97	LA Tenorio (31)	J. Aguilar, Thompson (9)	LA Tenorio (3)	Smart Araneta Coliseum	2–0

Semifinals: 4–3

Game	Date	Opponent	Score	High points	High rebounds	High assists	Location Attendance	Series
1	February 9	Star	L 74–78	Chris Ellis (12)	Scottie Thompson (10)	LA Tenorio (6)	Smart Araneta Coliseum	0–1
2	February 11	Star	L 89–91	Kevin Ferrer (25)	Japeth Aguilar (15)	Scottie Thompson (6)	Mall of Asia Arena	0–2
3	February 13	Star	W 73–62	Sol Mercado (16)	Japeth Aguilar (13)	Sol Mercado (6)	Mall of Asia Arena	1–2
4	February 15	Star	W 92–86	Jervy Cruz (21)	Scottie Thompson (14)	LA Tenorio (5)	Smart Araneta Coliseum	2–2
5	February 17	Star	L 80–89	Japeth Aguilar (13)	Ferrer, Mercado (5)	Chris Ellis (4)	Mall of Asia Arena	2–3
6	February 19	Star	W 91–67	Sol Mercado (21)	Japeth Aguilar (10)	LA Tenorio (5)	Smart Araneta Coliseum; 18,642	3–3
7	February 21	Star	W 89–76	Sol Mercado (23)	Scottie Thompson (9)	Mercado, Tenorio (5)	Mall of Asia Arena; 20,221	4–3

Finals: 1–4

Game	Date	Opponent	Score	High points	High rebounds	High assists	Location Attendance	Series
1	February 24	San Miguel	L 82–109	Chris Ellis (13)	Devance, Jamito (6)	Scottie Thompson (5)	Mall of Asia Arena	0–1
2	February 26	San Miguel	W 124–118 (OT)	Japeth Aguilar (23)	Scottie Thompson (18)	Mercado, Thompson (8)	Quezon Convention Center; 8,000	1–1
3	March 1	San Miguel	L 88–99	LA Tenorio (16)	J. Aguilar, Devance, Marcelo (7)	Devance, Tenorio (5)	Smart Araneta Coliseum; 16,773	1–2
4	March 3	San Miguel	L 85–94	Joe Devance (22)	Scottie Thompson (10)	Scottie Thompson (7)	Smart Araneta Coliseum; 17,146	1–3
5	March 5	San Miguel	L 85–91	Japeth Aguilar (26)	Japeth Aguilar (16)	Joe Devance (8)	Smart Araneta Coliseum; 20,217	1–4

2016–17 schedule

== Commissioner's Cup ==
=== Eliminations ===
==== Standings ====
Pos	Team	W	L	PCT	GB	Qualification
1	Barangay Ginebra San Miguel	9	2	.818 (Note: Head-to-head quotient: Barangay Ginebra 1.117, San Miguel 0.990, Star 0.903)	—	Twice-to-beat in the quarterfinals
2	San Miguel Beermen	9	2	.818	—	Twice-to-beat in the quarterfinals
3	Star Hotshots	9	2	.818	—	Best-of-three quarterfinals
4	TNT KaTropa	8	3	.727	1	Best-of-three quarterfinals
5	Meralco Bolts	7	4	.636	2	Best-of-three quarterfinals
6	Rain or Shine Elasto Painters	5	6	.455	4	Best-of-three quarterfinals
7	Phoenix Fuel Masters	4	7	.364 (Note: Head-to-head quotient: Phoenix 1.127, Alaska 1.116, GlobalPort 0.791; eighth seed playoff: GlobalPort 107–106 Alaska)	5	Twice-to-win in the quarterfinals
8	GlobalPort Batang Pier	4	7	.364	5	Twice-to-win in the quarterfinals
9	Alaska Aces	4	7	.364	5	
10	Mahindra Floodbuster	3	8	.273	6	
11	Blackwater Elite	2	9	.182 (Note: Head-to-head record: Blackwater 1–0 NLEX)	7	
12	NLEX Road Warriors	2	9	.182	7	

Source: PBA.ph

==== Game log ====
2017 PBA Commissioner's Cup game log
Total: 9–2
April: 4–1

Game	Date	Opponent	Score	High points	High rebounds	High assists	Location Attendance	Record
1	April 1	Phoenix	L 91–94	J. Aguilar, Devance (15)	Japeth Aguilar (8)	Scottie Thompson (7)	University of Southeastern Philippines Gym	0–1
2	April 5	GlobalPort	W 113–96	Justin Brownlee (29)	Japeth Aguilar (11)	Justin Brownlee (7)	Smart Araneta Coliseum	1–1
3	April 9	Star	W 113–98	Justin Brownlee (30)	Justin Brownlee (15)	Devance, Mercado (7)	Mall of Asia Arena	2–1
4	April 19	NLEX	W 101–92	Brownlee, Devance (18)	Justin Brownlee (13)	Brownlee, Tenorio, Thompson (7)	Cuneta Astrodome	3–1
5	April 23	TNT	W 107–89	Justin Brownlee (34)	Justin Brownlee (15)	Sol Mercado (7)	Smart Araneta Coliseum	4–1
All-Star Break

May: 4–1

Game	Date	Opponent	Score	High points	High rebounds	High assists	Location Attendance	Record
6	May 7	Alaska	W 103–102	Justin Brownlee (37)	Justin Brownlee (14)	Brownlee, Tenorio, Thompson (6)	Smart Araneta Coliseum	5–1
7	May 19	Rain or Shine	L 112–118	Justin Brownlee (38)	Brownlee, Thompson (8)	Scottie Thompson (8)	Cuneta Astrodome	5–2
8	May 21	San Miguel	W 107–99	Justin Brownlee (34)	Justin Brownlee (12)	LA Tenorio (8)	Mall of Asia Arena	6–2
9	May 26	Blackwater	W 96–82	Justin Brownlee (35)	Justin Brownlee (14)	Sol Mercado (6)	Alonte Sports Arena	7–2
10	May 28	Meralco	W 90–89	Brownlee, Tenorio (22)	Japeth Aguilar (13)	Joe Devance (6)	Ynares Center	8–2

June: 1–0

Game	Date	Opponent	Score	High points	High rebounds	High assists	Location Attendance	Record
11	June 2	Mahindra	W 94–80	Justin Brownlee (22)	Justin Brownlee (10)	Sol Mercado (6)	Smart Araneta Coliseum	9–2

2016–17 schedule

=== Playoffs ===
==== Bracket ====
Quarterfinals
(#1 twice-to-beat)
1	Barangay Ginebra	96
8	GlobalPort	85
(Best-of-3)
4	TNT	2
5	Meralco	1
(#2 twice-to-beat)
2	San Miguel	115
7	Phoenix	96
(Best-of-3)
3	Star	2
6	Rain or Shine	0

Semifinals (Best-of-5)
1	Barangay Ginebra	1
4	TNT	3
2	San Miguel	3
3	Star	1

Finals (Best-of-7)
4	TNT	2
2	San Miguel	4

==== Game log ====
2017 PBA Commissioner's Cup playoffs game log
Total: 2–3
Quarterfinals: 1–0

Game	Date	Opponent	Score	High points	High rebounds	High assists	Location Attendance	Series
1	June 6	GlobalPort	W 96–85	Justin Brownlee (39)	Scottie Thompson (12)	LA Tenorio (8)	Smart Araneta Coliseum	1–0

Semifinals: 1–3

Game	Date	Opponent	Score	High points	High rebounds	High assists	Location Attendance	Series
1	June 11	TNT	L 94–100	Justin Brownlee (24)	Justin Brownlee (14)	Justin Brownlee (6)	Mall of Asia Arena	0–1
2	June 13	TNT	L 103–107	Brownlee, Tenorio (22)	Justin Brownlee (12)	Scottie Thompson (9)	Mall of Asia Arena	0–2
3	June 15	TNT	W 125–101	Justin Brownlee (31)	Justin Brownlee (11)	Sol Mercado (5)	Smart Araneta Coliseum	1–2
4	June 17	TNT	L 109–122	Japeth Aguilar (31)	Justin Brownlee (15)	LA Tenorio (10)	Cuneta Astrodome	1–3

2016–17 schedule

== Governors' Cup ==
=== Eliminations ===
==== Standings ====
Pos	Team	W	L	PCT	GB	Qualification
1	Meralco Bolts	9	2	.818	—	Twice-to-beat in the quarterfinals
2	TNT KaTropa	8	3	.727 (Note: Head-to-head record: Talk 'N Text 1–0 Barangay Ginebra)	1	Twice-to-beat in the quarterfinals
3	Barangay Ginebra San Miguel	8	3	.727	1	Twice-to-beat in the quarterfinals
4	Star Hotshots	7	4	.636 (Note: Head to-head quotient: Star 1.04, NLEX 1.01, San Miguel 0.99, Rain or Shine 0.96)	2	Twice-to-beat in the quarterfinals
5	NLEX Road Warriors	7	4	.636	2	Twice-to-win in the quarterfinals
6	San Miguel Beermen	7	4	.636	2	Twice-to-win in the quarterfinals
7	Rain or Shine Elasto Painters	7	4	.636	2	Twice-to-win in the quarterfinals
8	Blackwater Elite	5	6	.455	4	Twice-to-win in the quarterfinals
9	Alaska Aces	3	8	.273 (Note: Head-to-head record: Alaska 1–0 GlobalPort)	6	
10	GlobalPort Batang Pier	3	8	.273	6	
11	Phoenix Fuel Masters	2	9	.182	7	
12	Kia Picanto	0	11	.000	9	

Source: PBA.ph

==== Game log ====
2017 PBA Governors' Cup game log
Total: 8–3
July: 1–1

Game	Date	Opponent	Score	High points	High rebounds	High assists	Location Attendance	Record
1	July 23	Meralco	L 78–93	LA Tenorio (16)	Greg Slaughter (14)	Japeth Aguilar (5)	Smart Araneta Coliseum	0–1
2	July 30	GlobalPort	W 124–108	LA Tenorio (29)	Justin Brownlee (12)	Scottie Thompson (9)	Smart Araneta Coliseum	1–1

August: 4–0

Game	Date	Opponent	Score	High points	High rebounds	High assists	Location Attendance	Record
3	August 2	Kia	W 120–99	Justin Brownlee (28)	Justin Brownlee (10)	Scottie Thompson (10)	Smart Araneta Coliseum	2–1
4	August 5	NLEX	W 110–97	Joe Devance (23)	Justin Brownlee (13)	Scottie Thompson (11)	Calasiao Sports Complex	3–1
5	August 26	Alaska	W 94–80	Justin Brownlee (22)	Greg Slaughter (13)	Scottie Thompson (10)	Hoops Dome	4–1
6	August 30	Phoenix	W 105–92	Justin Brownlee (24)	Justin Brownlee (17)	Sol Mercado (6)	Mall of Asia Arena	5–1

September: 3–2

Game	Date	Opponent	Score	High points	High rebounds	High assists	Location Attendance	Record
7	September 3	Star	W 105–101 (OT)	Justin Brownlee (33)	Joe Devance (11)	Joe Devance (8)	Smart Araneta Coliseum	6–1
8	September 8	Blackwater	W 98–81	Greg Slaughter (22)	Justin Brownlee (13)	Scottie Thompson (7)	Mall of Asia Arena	7–1
9	September 10	San Miguel	L 103–107	Japeth Aguilar (18)	Justin Brownlee (12)	Justin Brownlee (7)	Smart Araneta Coliseum	7–2
10	September 16	Rain or Shine	W 89–82	Justin Brownlee (28)	Greg Slaughter (13)	Mercado, Thompson (5)	Mall of Asia Arena	8–2
11	September 23	TNT	L 92–121	Justin Brownlee (28)	Justin Brownlee (14)	Brownlee, Tenorio (4)	Smart Araneta Coliseum	8–3

2016–17 schedule

=== Playoffs ===
==== Bracket ====
Quarterfinals (Top 4 twice-to-beat)
1	Meralco	91	104
8	Blackwater	92	96
4	Star	89
5	NLEX	77
2	TNT	102	118
7	Rain or Shine	106	114
3	Barangay Ginebra	104
6	San Miguel	84

Semifinals (Best-of-5)
1	Meralco	3
4	Star	0
2	TNT	1
3	Barangay Ginebra	3

Finals (Best-of-7)
1	Meralco	3
3	Barangay Ginebra	4

==== Game log ====
2017 PBA Governors' Cup playoffs game log
Total: 8–4
Quarterfinals: 1–0

Game	Date	Opponent	Score	High points	High rebounds	High assists	Location Attendance	Record
1	September 27	San Miguel	W 104–84	Justin Brownlee (37)	Scottie Thompson (13)	LA Tenorio (10)	Mall of Asia Arena	1–0

Semifinals: 3–1

Game	Date	Opponent	Score	High points	High rebounds	High assists	Location Attendance	Record
1	October 2	TNT	W 121–94	Justin Brownlee (21)	Brownlee, Mariano (8)	LA Tenorio (7)	Smart Araneta Coliseum	1–0
2	October 4	TNT	L 96–103	Justin Brownlee (25)	Justin Brownlee (10)	LA Tenorio (6)	Batangas City Coliseum	1–1
3	October 6	TNT	W 106–103	Joe Devance (20)	Justin Brownlee (13)	LA Tenorio (8)	Smart Araneta Coliseum	2–1
4	October 8	TNT	W 115–105	Justin Brownlee (46)	Justin Brownlee (10)	LA Tenorio (7)	Smart Araneta Coliseum	3–1

Finals: 4–3

Game	Date	Opponent	Score	High points	High rebounds	High assists	Location Attendance	Record
1	October 13	Meralco	W 102–87	Justin Brownlee (32)	Justin Brownlee (19)	Sol Mercado (8)	Quezon Convention Center	1–0
2	October 15	Meralco	W 86–76	Justin Brownlee (19)	Justin Brownlee (13)	Justin Brownlee (7)	Smart Araneta Coliseum; 16,159	2–0
3	October 18	Meralco	L 81–94	Justin Brownlee (15)	Justin Brownlee (11)	J. Aguilar, Devance (4)	Smart Araneta Coliseum	2–1
4	October 20	Meralco	L 83–85	Justin Brownlee (34)	Justin Brownlee (14)	Justin Brownlee (7)	Smart Araneta Coliseum; 16,164	2–2
5	October 22	Meralco	W 85–74	Justin Brownlee (20)	Greg Slaughter (16)	Justin Brownlee (5)	Philippine Arena; 36,445	3–2
6	October 25	Meralco	L 91–98	Justin Brownlee (23)	Justin Brownlee (9)	Brownlee, Thompson (4)	Philippine Arena; 53,642	3–3
7	October 27	Meralco	W 101–96	LA Tenorio (26)	Scottie Thompson (9)	J. Aguilar, Brownlee (5)	Philippine Arena; 54,086	4–3

2016–17 schedule

== Transactions ==
=== Trades ===
==== Pre-season ====
November
November 3, 2016	To Barangay Ginebra Paolo Taha	To Mahindra Dennice Villamor; Franklin Bonifacio

==== Governor's Cup ====
September
September 7, 2017	To Barangay Ginebra Raymond Aguilar; Arthur dela Cruz	To Blackwater Chris Ellis; Dave Marcelo

=== Rookie signings ===
Player	Number	Position	Date signed	Years	Amount	School/club team
Kevin Ferrer	14	Forward	November 14	3 Years	8.5 M	UST
Jericho De Guzman	15	Center				St. Benilde
Jammer Jamito	18	Forward				St. Claire

=== Recruited imports ===
Conference	Name	Country	Number	Debuted	Last game	Record
Commissioner's Cup	Justin Brownlee	(United States)	32	April 1 (vs. Phoenix)	June 17 (vs. TNT)	11–5
Governors' Cup	Justin Brownlee	(United States)	32	July 23 (vs. Meralco)	October 27 (vs. Meralco)	16–7

== Awards ==
Recipient	Award	Date awarded	Ref.
LA Tenorio	Commissioner's Cup Player of the Week	April 10, 2017	
LA Tenorio	Commissioner's Cup Player of the Week	April 24, 2017	
LA Tenorio	Commissioner's Cup Player of the Week	May 30, 2017	
LA Tenorio	Governors' Cup Player of the Week	July 31, 2017	
Joe Devance	Governors' Cup Player of the Week	August 8, 2017	
Greg Slaughter	Governors' Cup Best Player of the Conference	October 15, 2017	
Honors
Japeth Aguilar	All-Defensive Team	October 20, 2017	
Japeth Aguilar	First Mythical Team	October 20, 2017	
LA Tenorio	Second Mythical Team	October 20, 2017	
Joe Devance	Second Mythical Team	October 20, 2017	
