= 2016–17 Phoenix Fuel Masters season =

- Head coach: Ariel Vanguardia
- Owner: Phoenix Petroleum Philippines, Inc.

Philippine Cup results
- Record: 6–5 (54.5%)
- Place: 6th
- Playoff finish: Quarterfinalist (lost to Star, 0–2)

Commissioner's Cup results
- Record: 4–7 (36.4%)
- Place: 7th
- Playoff finish: Quarterfinalist (lost to San Miguel with twice-to-win disadvantage)

Governors' Cup results
- Record: 2–9 (18.2%)
- Place: 11th
- Playoff finish: Did not qualify

Phoenix Fuel Masters seasons

The 2016–17 Phoenix Fuel Masters season was the 2nd season of the franchise in the Philippine Basketball Association (PBA).

== Key dates ==
=== 2016 ===
- October 30: The 2016 PBA draft took place at Midtown Atrium, Robinson Place Manila.

== Draft picks ==
=== Special draft ===
Player	Position	Nationality	PBA D-League team	College
Matthew Wright	G	Canada	none	St. Bonaventure

=== Regular draft ===
Round	Pick	Player	Position	Nationality	PBA D-League team	College
2	2	Gelo Alolino	G	Philippines	Tanduay Light Rhum Masters	NU
2	10	Jeoffrey Javillonar	F	Philippines	Tanduay Light Rhum Masters	NU
3	16	Paolo Javelona	G	Philippines	BDO-National University	NU
3	18	Alejandrino Iñigo, Jr.	G	Philippines	Phoenix Accelerators	FEU

== Roster ==
2016–17 Phoenix Fuel Masters roster
Players
Coaches

Pos.	#	POB	Name	Height	Weight	DOB (YYYY–MM–DD)	From
G	1	(Philippines)	Gelo Alolino (R)	6 ft 0 in (1.83 m)	185 lb (84 kg)	1994–01–04	National-U
F	7	(Philippines)	JC Intal	6 ft 4 in (1.93 m)	185 lb (84 kg)	1983–11–18	Ateneo
G/F	8	(Philippines)	John Wilson	6 ft 2 in (1.88 m)	185 lb (84 kg)	1987–01–18	José Rizal
F	12	(Philippines)	Marvin Hayes	6 ft 2 in (1.88 m)	190 lb (86 kg)	1986–05–13	José Rizal
G/F	16	(Philippines)	Jeff Chan	6 ft 2 in (1.88 m)	185 lb (84 kg)	1983–02–11	Far Eastern
F/C	18	(Philippines)	Doug Kramer	6 ft 5 in (1.96 m)	235 lb (107 kg)	1983–07–10	Ateneo
G	22	(United States)	Karl Dehesa	6 ft 2 in (1.88 m)	185 lb (84 kg)	1987–05–24	Waldorf
G	26	(Philippines)	Chico Lanete	6 ft 0 in (1.83 m)	180 lb (82 kg)	1979–08–01	Lyceum
F	28	(United States)	Willy Wilson (C)	6 ft 3 in (1.91 m)	215 lb (98 kg)	1980–01–30	De La Salle
G	31	(Philippines)	RJ Jazul	5 ft 11 in (1.80 m)	170 lb (77 kg)	1986–04–11	Letran
F	33	(Philippines)	Dylan Ababou	6 ft 3 in (1.91 m)	185 lb (84 kg)	1986–12–07	UST
F/C	34	(Philippines)	Michael Miranda	6 ft 6 in (1.98 m)	210 lb (95 kg)	1990–12–12	San Sebastian
G/F	35	(Canada)	Matthew Wright (R)	6 ft 4 in (1.93 m)	200 lb (91 kg)	1992–03–07	St. Bonaventure
F	88	(Hong Kong)	Joseph Eriobu (R)	6 ft 4 in (1.93 m)	205 lb (93 kg)	1992–02–12	Mapúa

Head coach

- (Philippines) Ariel Vanguardia

Assistant coach(es)

- (Philippines) Justino Pinat (1st Assistant)
- (United States) Nic Belasco
- (Philippines) Caesar Polhen
- (United States) Will Voigt (Consultant)

Team manager

- (Philippines) Paolo Bugia

Legend

- (C) Team captain
- (CI) Commissioner's Cup Import
- (GI) Governors' Cup Import
- (EI) EASL Import
- (DP) Unsigned draft pick
- (FA) Free agent
- (IN) Inactive
- (S) Suspended
- (R) Rookie
- Injured

Roster

== Philippine Cup ==
=== Eliminations ===
==== Standings ====
Pos	Team	W	L	PCT	GB	Qualification
1	San Miguel Beermen	10	1	.909	—	Twice-to-beat in the quarterfinals
2	Alaska Aces	7	4	.636 (Note: Head-to-head record: Alaska 1–0 Star)	3	Twice-to-beat in the quarterfinals
3	Star Hotshots	7	4	.636	3	Best-of-three quarterfinals
4	TNT KaTropa	6	5	.545 (Note: Head-to-head quotient: TNT 1.09, GlobalPort 1.00, Phoenix 0.96, Barangay Ginebra 0.94.)	4	Best-of-three quarterfinals
5	GlobalPort Batang Pier	6	5	.545	4	Best-of-three quarterfinals
6	Phoenix Fuel Masters	6	5	.545	4	Best-of-three quarterfinals
7	Barangay Ginebra San Miguel	6	5	.545	4	Twice-to-win in the quarterfinals
8	Rain or Shine Elasto Painters	5	6	.455 (Note: Eighth seed playoff: Rain or Shine 103–80 Blackwater)	5	Twice-to-win in the quarterfinals
9	Blackwater Elite	5	6	.455	5	
10	Mahindra Floodbuster	3	8	.273 (Note: Head-to-head record: Mahindra 1–0 Meralco)	7	
11	Meralco Bolts	3	8	.273	7	
12	NLEX Road Warriors	2	9	.182	8	

Source: PBA.ph

==== Game log ====
2017 PBA Philippine Cup game log
Total: 6–5
November: 1–1

Game	Date	Opponent	Score	High points	High rebounds	High assists	Location Attendance	Record
1	November 23	Blackwater	L 87–94	Simon Enciso (25)	Willy Wilson (14)	Cyrus Baguio (5)	Smart Araneta Coliseum	0–1
2	November 30	San Miguel	W 92–85	JC Intal (22)	Willy Wilson (18)	Simon Enciso (9)	Ynares Center	1–1

December: 3–2

Game	Date	Opponent	Score	High points	High rebounds	High assists	Location Attendance	Record
3	December 4	Mahindra	W 114–104	JC Intal (24)	Prince Caperal (17)	Baguio, Enciso (5)	Smart Araneta Coliseum	2–1
4	December 10	Star	L 79–123	Simon Enciso (16)	Willy Wilson (7)	Enciso, W. Wilson (4)	Mall of Asia Arena	2–2
5	December 16	TNT	L 98–117	Mark Borboran (18)	Borboran, Caperal (6)	Simon Enciso (5)	Smart Araneta Coliseum	2–3
6	December 21	Meralco	W 94–90	Matthew Wright (22)	Borboran, Caperal, Wright (8)	Cyrus Baguio (10)	Filoil Flying V Centre	3–3
7	December 28	GlobalPort	W 101–99	Mark Borboran (23)	Matthew Wright (9)	Baguio, Wright (4)	Cuneta Astrodome	4–3

January: 2–2

Game	Date	Opponent	Score	High points	High rebounds	High assists	Location Attendance	Record
8	January 8	Rain or Shine	L 82–97	Matthew Wright (26)	Matthew Wright (12)	Enciso, Wright (5)	Smart Araneta Coliseum	4–4
9	January 18	NLEX	W 102–91	Simon Enciso (21)	Matthew Wright (12)	Matthew Wright (9)	Cuneta Astrodome	5–4
10	January 22	Barangay Ginebra	W 79–73	Matthew Wright (18)	Willy Wilson (12)	Matthew Wright (5)	PhilSports Arena	6–4
11	January 27	Alaska	L 85–106	Matthew Wright (18)	Matthew Wright (8)	Matthew Wright (4)	Cuneta Astrodome	6–5

2016–17 schedule

=== Playoffs ===
==== Bracket ====
Quarterfinals
(#1 twice-to-beat)
1	San Miguel	98
8	Rain or Shine	91
(Best-of-3)
4	TNT	2
5	GlobalPort	0
(#2 twice-to-beat)
2	Alaska	81	97
7	Barangay Ginebra	85	108
(Best-of-3)
3	Star	2
6	Phoenix	0

Semifinals (Best-of-7)
1	San Miguel	4
4	TNT	3
7	Barangay Ginebra	4
3	Star	3

Finals (Best-of-7)
1	San Miguel	4
7	Barangay Ginebra	1

==== Game log ====
2017 PBA Philippine Cup playoffs game log
Total: 0–2
Quarterfinals: 0–2

Game	Date	Opponent	Score	High points	High rebounds	High assists	Location Attendance	Series
1	February 4	Star	L 83–114	Matthew Wright (19)	Doug Kramer (12)	Dehesa, Intal (3)	Smart Araneta Coliseum	0–1
2	February 6	Star	L 71–91	Matthew Wright (24)	Willy Wilson (10)	JC Intal (4)	Smart Araneta Coliseum	0–2

2016–17 schedule

== Commissioner's Cup ==
=== Eliminations ===
==== Standings ====
Pos	Team	W	L	PCT	GB	Qualification
1	Barangay Ginebra San Miguel	9	2	.818 (Note: Head-to-head quotient: Barangay Ginebra 1.117, San Miguel 0.990, Star 0.903)	—	Twice-to-beat in the quarterfinals
2	San Miguel Beermen	9	2	.818	—	Twice-to-beat in the quarterfinals
3	Star Hotshots	9	2	.818	—	Best-of-three quarterfinals
4	TNT KaTropa	8	3	.727	1	Best-of-three quarterfinals
5	Meralco Bolts	7	4	.636	2	Best-of-three quarterfinals
6	Rain or Shine Elasto Painters	5	6	.455	4	Best-of-three quarterfinals
7	Phoenix Fuel Masters	4	7	.364 (Note: Head-to-head quotient: Phoenix 1.127, Alaska 1.116, GlobalPort 0.791; eighth seed playoff: GlobalPort 107–106 Alaska)	5	Twice-to-win in the quarterfinals
8	GlobalPort Batang Pier	4	7	.364	5	Twice-to-win in the quarterfinals
9	Alaska Aces	4	7	.364	5	
10	Mahindra Floodbuster	3	8	.273	6	
11	Blackwater Elite	2	9	.182 (Note: Head-to-head record: Blackwater 1–0 NLEX)	7	
12	NLEX Road Warriors	2	9	.182	7	

Source: PBA.ph

==== Game log ====
2017 PBA Commissioner's Cup game log
Total: 4–7
March: 1–2

Game	Date	Opponent	Score	High points	High rebounds	High assists	Location Attendance	Record
1	March 18	Blackwater	W 118–116 (2OT)	Eugene Phelps (53)	Eugene Phelps (21)	RJ Jazul (6)	Cuneta Astrodome	1–0
2	March 22	Star	L 82–101	Jameel McKay (34)	Jameel McKay (20)	RJ Jazul (5)	Smart Araneta Coliseum	1–1
3	March 26	TNT	L 109–134	Jameel McKay (31)	Jameel McKay (11)	JC Intal (5)	Ynares Center	1–2

April: 2–2

Game	Date	Opponent	Score	High points	High rebounds	High assists	Location Attendance	Record
4	April 1	Barangay Ginebra	W 94–91	Matthew Wright (27)	Jameel McKay (28)	Cyrus Baguio (5)	University of Southeastern Philippines Gym	2–2
5	April 7	San Miguel	L 88–110	Jameel McKay (21)	Jameel McKay (16)	Matthew Wright (7)	Mall of Asia Arena	2–3
6	April 12	Rain or Shine	L 94–96	Jameel McKay (27)	Jameel McKay (18)	Jameel McKay (6)	Smart Araneta Coliseum	2–4
7	April 21	Alaska	W 94–86	Jameel McKay (42)	Jameel McKay (22)	RJ Jazul (8)	Smart Araneta Coliseum	3–4
All-Star Break

May: 1–3

Game	Date	Opponent	Score	High points	High rebounds	High assists	Location Attendance	Record
8	May 3	Meralco	L 66–81	Jameel McKay (16)	Jameel McKay (16)	RJ Jazul (5)	Smart Araneta Coliseum	3–5
9	May 5	GlobalPort	W 84–72	Jameel McKay (22)	Jameel McKay (20)	six players (2)	Smart Araneta Coliseum	4–5
10	May 21	Mahindra	L 121–122 (OT)	Jameel McKay (18)	Jameel McKay (12)	Jameel McKay (7)	Mall of Asia Arena	4–6
11	May 27	NLEX	L 114–116	Matthew Wright (42)	Jameel McKay (14)	four players (4)	Ynares Center	4–7

2016–17 schedule

=== Playoffs ===
==== Bracket ====
Quarterfinals
(#1 twice-to-beat)
1	Barangay Ginebra	96
8	GlobalPort	85
(Best-of-3)
4	TNT	2
5	Meralco	1
(#2 twice-to-beat)
2	San Miguel	115
7	Phoenix	96
(Best-of-3)
3	Star	2
6	Rain or Shine	0

Semifinals (Best-of-5)
1	Barangay Ginebra	1
4	TNT	3
2	San Miguel	3
3	Star	1

Finals (Best-of-7)
4	TNT	2
2	San Miguel	4

==== Game log ====
2017 PBA Commissioner's Cup playoffs game log
Total: 0–1
Quarterfinals: 0–1

Game	Date	Opponent	Score	High points	High rebounds	High assists	Location Attendance	Series
1	June 6	San Miguel	L 96–115	Jameel McKay (20)	Jameel McKay (13)	Matthew Wright (7)	Smart Araneta Coliseum	0–1

2016–17 schedule

== Governors' Cup ==
=== Eliminations ===
==== Standings ====
Pos	Team	W	L	PCT	GB	Qualification
1	Meralco Bolts	9	2	.818	—	Twice-to-beat in the quarterfinals
2	TNT KaTropa	8	3	.727 (Note: Head-to-head record: Talk 'N Text 1–0 Barangay Ginebra)	1	Twice-to-beat in the quarterfinals
3	Barangay Ginebra San Miguel	8	3	.727	1	Twice-to-beat in the quarterfinals
4	Star Hotshots	7	4	.636 (Note: Head to-head quotient: Star 1.04, NLEX 1.01, San Miguel 0.99, Rain or Shine 0.96)	2	Twice-to-beat in the quarterfinals
5	NLEX Road Warriors	7	4	.636	2	Twice-to-win in the quarterfinals
6	San Miguel Beermen	7	4	.636	2	Twice-to-win in the quarterfinals
7	Rain or Shine Elasto Painters	7	4	.636	2	Twice-to-win in the quarterfinals
8	Blackwater Elite	5	6	.455	4	Twice-to-win in the quarterfinals
9	Alaska Aces	3	8	.273 (Note: Head-to-head record: Alaska 1–0 GlobalPort)	6	
10	GlobalPort Batang Pier	3	8	.273	6	
11	Phoenix Fuel Masters	2	9	.182	7	
12	Kia Picanto	0	11	.000	9	

Source: PBA.ph

==== Game log ====
2017 PBA Governors' Cup game log
Total: 2–9
July: 2–2

Game	Date	Opponent	Score	High points	High rebounds	High assists	Location Attendance	Record
1	July 19	Kia	W 118–105	Eugene Phelps (33)	Eugene Phelps (14)	three players (3)	Smart Araneta Coliseum	1–0
2	July 22	Alaska	W 95–93	Eugene Phelps (29)	Eugene Phelps (14)	RJ Jazul (5)	Mall of Asia Arena	2–0
3	July 26	GlobalPort	L 91–100	Eugene Phelps (32)	Eugene Phelps (17)	Eugene Phelps (5)	Smart Araneta Coliseum	2–1
4	July 30	NLEX	L 91–95	Eugene Phelps (31)	Eugene Phelps (18)	Eugene Phelps (6)	Smart Araneta Coliseum	2–2

August: 0–5

Game	Date	Opponent	Score	High points	High rebounds	High assists	Location Attendance	Record
5	August 6	Blackwater	L 86–92	Jazul, Phelps (13)	Eugene Phelps (17)	Willy Wilson (4)	Smart Araneta Coliseum	2–3
6	August 18	Meralco	L 104–107	Brandon Brown (38)	Brandon Brown (9)	RJ Jazul (6)	Smart Araneta Coliseum	2–4
7	August 23	Star	L 81–100	Brandon Brown (33)	Brandon Brown (23)	RJ Jazul (4)	Smart Araneta Coliseum	2–5
8	August 25	TNT	L 103–110	Brandon Brown (49)	Brandon Brown (19)	three players (5)	Smart Araneta Coliseum	2–6
9	August 30	Barangay Ginebra	L 92–105	Brandon Brown (26)	Brandon Brown (18)	RJ Jazul (8)	Mall of Asia Arena	2–7

September: 0–2

Game	Date	Opponent	Score	High points	High rebounds	High assists	Location Attendance	Record
10	September 13	Rain or Shine	L 111–116	Matthew Wright (36)	Brandon Brown (20)	Brandon Brown (4)	Ynares Center	2–8
11	September 20	San Miguel	L 107–109	Brandon Brown (30)	Brandon Brown (17)	Brown, Wright (4)	Ynares Center	2–9

2016–17 schedule

== Transactions ==
=== Free agency ===
Player	Date signed	Contract amount	Former team
Marvin Hayes	November 12, 2016	Not disclosed	GlobalPort Batang Pier
Karl Dehesa	January 31, 2017	Not disclosed	GlobalPort Batang Pier
Jeff Viernes	2017	Not disclosed	

=== Trades ===
==== Philippine Cup ====
February
February 18, 2017	To Phoenix RJ Jazul	To Alaska Simon Enciso
February 21, 2017	To Phoenix Joseph Eriobu	To Mahindra Prince Caperal

==== Governors' Cup ====
August
August 7, 2017	To Phoenix Jeff Chan	To Rain or Shine Mark Borboran Season 46 2nd-round pick	
August 15, 2017	To Phoenix Dylan Ababou; 2020 2nd round pick	To Globalport Karl Dehesa; 2019 first round pick	To NLEX Cyrus Baguio

=== Recruited imports ===
Conference	Name	Country	Number	Debuted	Last game	Record
Commissioner's Cup	Eugene Phelps	(United States)	14	March 18 (vs. Blackwater)	March 18 (vs. Blackwater)	1–0
Commissioner's Cup	Jameel McKay	(United States)	5	March 22 (vs. Star)	June 6 (vs. San Miguel)	3–8
Governors' Cup	Eugene Phelps	(United States)	4	July 19 (vs. Kia)	August 6 (vs. Blackwater)	2–3
Governors' Cup	Brandon Brown	(United States)	23	August 18 (vs. Meralco)	September 20 (vs. San Miguel)	0–6

== Awards ==
Recipient	Award	Date awarded	Ref.
JC Intal	Philippine Cup Player of the Week	December 4, 2016	
Matthew Wright	Philippine Cup Player of the Week	January 23, 2017	
Matthew Wright	All-Star Game Most Valuable Player (Mindanao leg)	April 26, 2017	
Matthew Wright	All-Star Game Most Valuable Player (Luzon leg)	April 28, 2017	
