= Simon Enciso =

Filipino-American basketball player (born 1991)

No. 0 – TNT Tropang 5G
- Position: Point guard / shooting guard
- League: PBA

Personal information
- Born: February 12, 1991 (age 35) San Francisco, California, U.S.
- Listed height: 5 ft 11 in (1.80 m)
- Listed weight: 185 lb (84 kg)

Career information
- High school: Terra Nova (Pacifica, California)
- College: Skyline College (2010–2012); Notre Dame de Namur (2012–2014)
- PBA draft: 2015: 2nd round, 17th overall pick
- Drafted by: Rain or Shine Elasto Painters
- Playing career: 2015–present

Career history
- 2015–2016: NLEX Road Warriors
- 2016–2017: Phoenix Fuel Masters
- 2017–2019: Alaska Aces
- 2020: TNT Tropang Giga
- 2021: Blackwater Bossing
- 2021–2025: San Miguel Beermen
- 2025–present: TNT Tropang 5G

Career highlights
- 2× PBA champion (2022 Philippine, 2023–24 Commissioner's)

Simon Nicholas Marquez Enciso (born February 12, 1991) is a Filipino-American professional basketball player for the TNT Tropang 5G of the Philippine Basketball Association (PBA).

== Amateur career ==
=== High school career ===
Enciso attended at Terra Nova High School in California, where he suited up for the Terra Nova HS Tigers. In his senior year in 2008–09, he averaged 18.6 points, 2.9 rebounds, 3.5 assists and 2.5 steals per game.

=== College career ===
Enciso played two seasons of basketball at Skyline College, and then he transferred to Notre Dame de Namur University in 2012. In his junior year at NDNU, he posted per game averages of 7.3 points, 1.9 rebounds, 1.8 assists, 31.5% 3PT FG percentage in 22 games he played (he averaged 24.3 minutes per game). His senior year saw an increase in his minutes and production, averaging 13.9 points, 4.15 assists, 40.5% FG percentage, 37.4% 3PT FG percentage and 35.1 minutes per game in 26 games (started 25 of them).

=== PBA D-League ===
Enciso applied for the 2014 NBA draft but was not drafted by any team. He decided to move to the Philippines and applied for the 2014 PBA D-League draft, where he was drafted in the third round by the Cebuana Lhuillier Gems.

== Professional career ==
Enciso was drafted in the second round by the Rain or Shine Elasto Painters with the 17th overall pick in the 2015 PBA draft. He was then traded to NLEX Road Warriors in exchange for a 2018 second-round pick.

In his PBA debut for the Road Warriors, he registered 15 points (from five three-pointers), three assists and three rebounds in 28 minutes.

On May 10, 2016, Enciso, along with Mark Borboran and a 2018 second-round pick, was traded to the Phoenix Fuel Masters for Mac Baracael and Emman Monfort.

On February 18, 2017, he was traded to the Alaska Aces in exchange for fellow guard RJ Jazul. On August 26, 2018, he registered a career-high 30 points and 9 three-pointers made in a 121–95 blowout win over the TNT Katropa.

On January 6, 2020, he was traded to the TNT KaTropa for Michael DiGregorio and a 2023 second-round draft pick.

On March 11, 2021, Enciso was traded to the Blackwater Bossing in a three-team trade involving Blackwater, TNT, and NLEX Road Warriors.

On September 28, 2021, he was traded to the Terrafirma Dyip for Rashawn McCarthy. On November 13, 2021, before appearing in a game for Terrafirma, he was traded to the San Miguel Beermen for Alex Cabagnot.

On April 8, 2025, Enciso signed with the TNT Tropang 5G.

== PBA career statistics ==
Legend
GP	Games played	MPG	Minutes per game	FG%	Field-goal percentage
3FG%	3-point field-goal percentage	4P%	4-point field-goal percentage	FT%	Free-throw percentage
RPG	Rebounds per game	APG	Assists per game	SPG	Steals per game
BPG	Blocks per game	PPG	Points per game	127	Career high

As of the end of 2024–25 season

=== Season-by-season averages ===
Year	Team	GP	MPG	FG%	3P%	4P%	FT%	RPG	APG	SPG	BPG	PPG
2015–16	NLEX	37	24.6	.369	.351	—	.727	1.7	2.8	.2	.1	7.3
2015–16	Phoenix	37	24.6	.369	.351	—	.727	1.7	2.8	.2	.1	7.3
2016–17	Phoenix	36	26.9	.329	.271	—	.429	2.0	3.6	.8	.0	8.4
2016–17	Alaska	36	26.9	.329	.271	—	.429	2.0	3.6	.8	.0	8.4
2017–18	Alaska	50	26.9	.390	.336	—	.744	1.9	3.6	.5	.1	8.9
2019	Alaska	36	30.3	.373	.333	—	.636	2.6	3.8	.8	.1	10.2
2020	TNT	22	31.7	.345	.319	—	.533	2.3	2.8	.7	.1	9.6
2021	Blackwater	19	27.0	.376	.301	—	.556	2.3	2.9	.3	—	9.3
2021	San Miguel	19	27.0	.376	.301	—	.556	2.3	2.9	.3	—	9.3
2022–23	San Miguel	59	26.5	.405	.348	—	.300	1.9	4.3	.7	.0	7.2
2023–24	San Miguel	30	13.3	.344	.356	—	—	.9	1.4	.3	.1	2.9
2024–25	San Miguel	33	16.6	.356	.356	.182	.688	1.6	1.8	.4	—	5.5
2024–25	TNT	33	16.6	.356	.356	.182	.688	1.6	1.8	.4	—	5.5
Career		322	25.0	.370	.328	.182	.597	1.9	3.2	.5	.0	7.7

== Personal life ==
Born in San Francisco, California to Filipino parents, Enciso dreamed of playing professional basketball in any country but had to fulfill his parents’ desire for him to get a degree before pursuing his career in the sport. He graduated with a degree in Kinesiology. He says he patterned his game after NBA stars Derrick Rose and Kyrie Irving.
