= 2016–17 Rain or Shine Elasto Painters season =

- Head coach: Caloy Garcia
- Owners: Asian Coatings Philippines, Inc.

Philippine Cup results
- Record: 5–6 (45.5%)
- Place: 8th
- Playoff finish: Quarterfinalist (lost to San Miguel with twice-to-win disadvantage)

Commissioner's Cup results
- Record: 5–6 (45.5%)
- Place: 6th
- Playoff finish: Quarterfinalist (lost to Star, 0–2)

Governors' Cup results
- Record: 7–4 (63.6%)
- Place: 7th
- Playoff finish: Quarterfinalist (lost to TNT with twice-to-win disadvantage)

Rain or Shine Elasto Painters seasons

The 2016–17 Rain or Shine Elasto Painters season was the 11th season of the franchise in the Philippine Basketball Association (PBA).

== Key dates ==
- October 30: The 2016 PBA draft took place at Midtown Atrium, Robinson Place Manila.

== Draft picks ==
=== Special draft ===
Player	Position	Nationality	PBA D-League team	College
Mike Tolomia	G	Philippines	Phoenix Accelerators	FEU

=== Regular draft ===
Rain or Shine passed in the regular draft. They originally owned one second round and three third round picks.

== Roster ==
2016–17 Rain or Shine Elasto Painters roster
Players
Coaches

Pos.	#	POB	Name	Height	Weight	DOB (YYYY–MM–DD)	From
F	5	(United States)	Gabe Norwood (C)	6 ft 6 in (1.98 m)	190 lb (86 kg)	1985–02–09	George Mason
G	8	(Philippines)	Ed Daquioag (R)	6 ft 0 in (1.83 m)	170 lb (77 kg)	1991–08–18	UST
G	9	(Philippines)	Jericho Cruz	6 ft 1 in (1.85 m)	190 lb (86 kg)	1990–10–11	Adamson
F	12	(Philippines)	Dexter Maiquez (R)	6 ft 3 in (1.91 m)	220 lb (100 kg)	1991–06–09	San Sebastian
G	13	(United States)	Maverick Ahanmisi	6 ft 2 in (1.88 m)	185 lb (84 kg)	1991–07–17	Minnesota
F/C	15	(Philippines)	Jewel Ponferada	6 ft 5 in (1.96 m)	211 lb (96 kg)	1988–07–08	National-U
F	16	(Philippines)	Mark Borboran	6 ft 4 in (1.93 m)	185 lb (84 kg)	1984–11–20	UE
G	17	(Philippines)	Chris Tiu	6 ft 0 in (1.83 m)	176 lb (80 kg)	1985–07–15	Ateneo
G/F	18	(Philippines)	James Yap	6 ft 2 in (1.88 m)	205 lb (93 kg)	1982–02–15	UE
F	19	(Philippines)	Don Trollano	6 ft 3 in (1.91 m)	182 lb (83 kg)	1992–01–07	Adamson
C	20	(Philippines)	Raymond Almazan	6 ft 8 in (2.03 m)	194 lb (88 kg)	1989–08–02	Letran
F	23	(Philippines)	Jay Washington	6 ft 7 in (2.01 m)	210 lb (95 kg)	1981–10–10	Eckerd
G	25	(Philippines)	Billy Ray Robles (R)	5 ft 10 in (1.78 m)	175 lb (79 kg)	1992–05–30	NISU
F/C	30	(Philippines)	Beau Belga	6 ft 6 in (1.98 m)	235 lb (107 kg)	1986–11–30	Philippine Christian
F	33	(Philippines)	Ronnie Matias	6 ft 4 in (1.93 m)	180 lb (82 kg)	1983–11–29	Manila
G	35	(United States)	Jerramy King (R)	5 ft 11 in (1.80 m)	165 lb (75 kg)	1990–09–26	Long Beach State

Head coach

- (Philippines) Caloy Garcia

Assistant coach(es)

- (Philippines) Mike Buendia (1st Assistant)
- (Philippines) Jolly Escobar
- (Philippines) Ricky Umayam
- (United States) Don Dulay
- (Philippines) Matthew Makalintal

Team manager

- (Philippines) Mamerto Mondragon
- (Philippines) Jay Legacion (Assistant)

Legend

- (C) Team captain
- (CI) Commissioner's Cup Import
- (GI) Governors' Cup Import
- (EI) EASL Import
- (DP) Unsigned draft pick
- (FA) Free agent
- (IN) Inactive
- (S) Suspended
- (R) Rookie
- Injured

Roster

== Philippine Cup ==
=== Eliminations ===
==== Standings ====
Pos	Team	W	L	PCT	GB	Qualification
1	San Miguel Beermen	10	1	.909	—	Twice-to-beat in the quarterfinals
2	Alaska Aces	7	4	.636 (Note: Head-to-head record: Alaska 1–0 Star)	3	Twice-to-beat in the quarterfinals
3	Star Hotshots	7	4	.636	3	Best-of-three quarterfinals
4	TNT KaTropa	6	5	.545 (Note: Head-to-head quotient: TNT 1.09, GlobalPort 1.00, Phoenix 0.96, Barangay Ginebra 0.94.)	4	Best-of-three quarterfinals
5	GlobalPort Batang Pier	6	5	.545	4	Best-of-three quarterfinals
6	Phoenix Fuel Masters	6	5	.545	4	Best-of-three quarterfinals
7	Barangay Ginebra San Miguel	6	5	.545	4	Twice-to-win in the quarterfinals
8	Rain or Shine Elasto Painters	5	6	.455 (Note: Eighth seed playoff: Rain or Shine 103–80 Blackwater)	5	Twice-to-win in the quarterfinals
9	Blackwater Elite	5	6	.455	5	
10	Mahindra Floodbuster	3	8	.273 (Note: Head-to-head record: Mahindra 1–0 Meralco)	7	
11	Meralco Bolts	3	8	.273	7	
12	NLEX Road Warriors	2	9	.182	8	

Source: PBA.ph

==== Game log ====
2017 PBA Philippine Cup game log
Total: 5–6
November: 2–0

Game	Date	Opponent	Score	High points	High rebounds	High assists	Location Attendance	Record
1	November 23	TNT	W 101–87	Jericho Cruz (18)	Raymond Almazan (12)	seven players (2)	Smart Araneta Coliseum	1–0
2	November 30	Mahindra	W 105–83	Jericho Cruz (15)	Beau Belga (8)	Ahanmisi, Cruz, Maiquez (4)	Ynares Center	2–0

December: 2–2

Game	Date	Opponent	Score	High points	High rebounds	High assists	Location Attendance	Record
3	December 4	Barangay Ginebra	L 74–81	Raymond Almazan (13)	Jay Washington (17)	Ahanmisi, Belga (3)	Smart Araneta Coliseum	2–1
4	December 9	Blackwater	W 107–93	James Yap (15)	Raymond Almazan (16)	Beau Belga (5)	Smart Araneta Coliseum	3–1
5	December 18	Star	L 91–99	Raymond Almazan (19)	Raymond Almazan (13)	Jeff Chan (5)	Smart Araneta Coliseum	3–2
6	December 23	NLEX	W 107–97	Jewel Ponferada (22)	Belga, Ponferada (9)	Maverick Ahanmisi (7)	PhilSports Arena	4–2

January: 1–3

Game	Date	Opponent	Score	High points	High rebounds	High assists	Location Attendance	Record
7	January 8	Phoenix	W 97–82	Jericho Cruz (21)	Jay Washington (11)	Beau Belga (4)	Smart Araneta Coliseum	5–2
8	January 13	San Miguel	L 101–107 (OT)	Beau Belga (14)	Jay Washington (6)	Ahanmisi, Norwood (6)	Mall of Asia Arena	5–3
9	January 20	Meralco	L 72–82	James Yap (17)	Gabe Norwood (8)	Gabe Norwood (4)	Cuneta Astrodome	5–4
10	January 29	GlobalPort	L 99–117	Jeff Chan (26)	Belga, Ponferada (9)	Beau Belga (5)	Cuneta Astrodome	5–5

February: 0–1

Game	Date	Opponent	Score	High points	High rebounds	High assists	Location Attendance	Record
11	February 1	Alaska	L 89–94	Norwood, Yap (16)	Belga, Norwood (8)	Chan, Cruz (4)	Cuneta Astrodome	5–6

2016–17 schedule

=== Playoffs ===
==== Bracket ====
Quarterfinals
(#1 twice-to-beat)
1	San Miguel	98
8	Rain or Shine	91
(Best-of-3)
4	TNT	2
5	GlobalPort	0
(#2 twice-to-beat)
2	Alaska	81	97
7	Barangay Ginebra	85	108
(Best-of-3)
3	Star	2
6	Phoenix	0

Semifinals (Best-of-7)
1	San Miguel	4
4	TNT	3
7	Barangay Ginebra	4
3	Star	3

Finals (Best-of-7)
1	San Miguel	4
7	Barangay Ginebra	1

==== Game log ====
2017 PBA Philippine Cup playoffs game log
Total: 1–1
8th seed playoff: 1–0

Game	Date	Opponent	Score	High points	High rebounds	High assists	Location Attendance	Series
1	February 3	Blackwater	W 103–80	Jay Washington (15)	Cruz (12)	Jeff Chan (6)	Smart Araneta Coliseum	1–0

Quarterfinals: 0–1

Game	Date	Opponent	Score	High points	High rebounds	High assists	Location Attendance	Series
1	February 5	San Miguel	L 91–98	Beau Belga (18)	Norwood, Washington (8)	Jeff Chan (4)	Ynares Center	0–1

2016–17 schedule

== Commissioner's Cup ==
=== Eliminations ===
==== Standings ====
Pos	Team	W	L	PCT	GB	Qualification
1	Barangay Ginebra San Miguel	9	2	.818 (Note: Head-to-head quotient: Barangay Ginebra 1.117, San Miguel 0.990, Star 0.903)	—	Twice-to-beat in the quarterfinals
2	San Miguel Beermen	9	2	.818	—	Twice-to-beat in the quarterfinals
3	Star Hotshots	9	2	.818	—	Best-of-three quarterfinals
4	TNT KaTropa	8	3	.727	1	Best-of-three quarterfinals
5	Meralco Bolts	7	4	.636	2	Best-of-three quarterfinals
6	Rain or Shine Elasto Painters	5	6	.455	4	Best-of-three quarterfinals
7	Phoenix Fuel Masters	4	7	.364 (Note: Head-to-head quotient: Phoenix 1.127, Alaska 1.116, GlobalPort 0.791; eighth seed playoff: GlobalPort 107–106 Alaska)	5	Twice-to-win in the quarterfinals
8	GlobalPort Batang Pier	4	7	.364	5	Twice-to-win in the quarterfinals
9	Alaska Aces	4	7	.364	5	
10	Mahindra Floodbuster	3	8	.273	6	
11	Blackwater Elite	2	9	.182 (Note: Head-to-head record: Blackwater 1–0 NLEX)	7	
12	NLEX Road Warriors	2	9	.182	7	

Source: PBA.ph

==== Game log ====
2017 PBA Commissioner's Cup game log
Total: 5–6
March: 3–1

Game	Date	Opponent	Score	High points	High rebounds	High assists	Location Attendance	Record
1	March 17	NLEX	W 113–105	James Yap (26)	Shawn Taggart (10)	Belga, Taggart (4)	Smart Araneta Coliseum	1–0
2	March 19	Mahindra	W 99–95 (OT)	Shawn Taggart (29)	Belga, Taggart (10)	Ahanmisi, Taggart (4)	Smart Araneta Coliseum	2–0
3	March 26	Blackwater	W 95–88	Shawn Taggart (26)	Shawn Taggart (12)	Belga, Cruz (4)	Ynares Center	3–0
4	March 31	Meralco	L 83–89	Shawn Taggart (27)	Shawn Taggart (13)	Chris Tiu (3)	Mall of Asia Arena	3–1

April: 1–2

Game	Date	Opponent	Score	High points	High rebounds	High assists	Location Attendance	Record
5	April 2	Alaska	L 102–105	Shawn Taggart (40)	Shawn Taggart (14)	Jeff Chan (5)	Smart Araneta Coliseum	3–2
6	April 12	Phoenix	W 96–94	Jeff Chan (24)	Shawn Taggart (17)	Shawn Taggart (5)	Smart Araneta Coliseum	4–2
7	April 22	San Miguel	L 98–111	Shawn Taggart (24)	Shawn Taggart (10)	four players (3)	Mall of Asia Arena	4–3
All-Star Break

May: 1–3

Game	Date	Opponent	Score	High points	High rebounds	High assists	Location Attendance	Record
8	May 6	Star	L 93–99	Chan, Taggart (20)	Jay Washington (11)	four players (2)	Batangas City Coliseum	4–4
9	May 19	Barangay Ginebra	W 118–112	Duke Crews (28)	Duke Crews (22)	Jeff Chan (4)	Cuneta Astrodome	5–4
10	May 26	GlobalPort	L 101–107	Duke Crews (23)	Duke Crews (17)	Jericho Cruz (6)	Alonte Sports Arena	5–5
11	May 28	TNT	L 102–105	James Yap (23)	Duke Crews (17)	Belga, Cruz (3)	Ynares Center	5–6

2016–17 schedule

=== Playoffs ===
==== Bracket ====
Quarterfinals
(#1 twice-to-beat)
1	Barangay Ginebra	96
8	GlobalPort	85
(Best-of-3)
4	TNT	2
5	Meralco	1
(#2 twice-to-beat)
2	San Miguel	115
7	Phoenix	96
(Best-of-3)
3	Star	2
6	Rain or Shine	0

Semifinals (Best-of-5)
1	Barangay Ginebra	1
4	TNT	3
2	San Miguel	3
3	Star	1

Finals (Best-of-7)
4	TNT	2
2	San Miguel	4

==== Game log ====
2017 PBA Commissioner's Cup playoffs game log
Total: 0–2
Quarterfinals: 0–2

Game	Date	Opponent	Score	High points	High rebounds	High assists	Location Attendance	Series
1	June 5	Star	L 82–118	Duke Crews (19)	Duke Crews (13)	Mike Tolomia (5)	Smart Araneta Coliseum	0–1
2	June 7	Star	L 69–84	Duke Crews (12)	Beau Belga (6)	Maverick Ahanmisi (4)	Smart Araneta Coliseum	0–2

2016–17 schedule

== Governors' Cup ==
=== Eliminations ===
==== Standings ====
Pos	Team	W	L	PCT	GB	Qualification
1	Meralco Bolts	9	2	.818	—	Twice-to-beat in the quarterfinals
2	TNT KaTropa	8	3	.727 (Note: Head-to-head record: Talk 'N Text 1–0 Barangay Ginebra)	1	Twice-to-beat in the quarterfinals
3	Barangay Ginebra San Miguel	8	3	.727	1	Twice-to-beat in the quarterfinals
4	Star Hotshots	7	4	.636 (Note: Head to-head quotient: Star 1.04, NLEX 1.01, San Miguel 0.99, Rain or Shine 0.96)	2	Twice-to-beat in the quarterfinals
5	NLEX Road Warriors	7	4	.636	2	Twice-to-win in the quarterfinals
6	San Miguel Beermen	7	4	.636	2	Twice-to-win in the quarterfinals
7	Rain or Shine Elasto Painters	7	4	.636	2	Twice-to-win in the quarterfinals
8	Blackwater Elite	5	6	.455	4	Twice-to-win in the quarterfinals
9	Alaska Aces	3	8	.273 (Note: Head-to-head record: Alaska 1–0 GlobalPort)	6	
10	GlobalPort Batang Pier	3	8	.273	6	
11	Phoenix Fuel Masters	2	9	.182	7	
12	Kia Picanto	0	11	.000	9	

Source: PBA.ph

==== Game log ====
2017 PBA Governors' Cup game log
Total: 7–4
July: 1–2

Game	Date	Opponent	Score	High points	High rebounds	High assists	Location Attendance	Record
1	July 21	GlobalPort	W 98–96	J.D. Weatherspoon (25)	J.D. Weatherspoon (15)	Maverick Ahanmisi (4)	Smart Araneta Coliseum	1–0
2	July 26	NLEX	L 114–122 (2OT)	J.D. Weatherspoon (20)	J.D. Weatherspoon (16)	Maverick Ahanmisi (7)	Smart Araneta Coliseum	1–1
3	July 29	Meralco	L 73–89	J.D. Weatherspoon (19)	J.D. Weatherspoon (13)	Maverick Ahanmisi (3)	Ynares Center	1–2

August: 3–0

Game	Date	Opponent	Score	High points	High rebounds	High assists	Location Attendance	Record
4	August 13	Kia	W 94–86	J'Nathan Bullock (20)	J'Nathan Bullock (10)	Chris Tiu (8)	Mall of Asia Arena	2–2
5	August 20	TNT	W 105–73	J'Nathan Bullock (20)	J'Nathan Bullock (14)	Chris Tiu (6)	Smart Araneta Coliseum	3–2
6	August 27	Star	W 92–88	Bullock, Cruz (18)	Raymond Almazan (14)	J'Nathan Bullock (5)	Smart Araneta Coliseum	4–2

September: 3–2

Game	Date	Opponent	Score	High points	High rebounds	High assists	Location Attendance	Record
7	September 6	San Miguel	L 96–103	J'Nathan Bullock (22)	J'Nathan Bullock (13)	J'Nathan Bullock (17)	Smart Araneta Coliseum	4–3
8	September 13	Phoenix	W 116–111	J'Nathan Bullock (33)	Raymond Almazan (11)	Maverick Ahanmisi (9)	Ynares Center	5–3
9	September 16	Barangay Ginebra	L 82–89	Raymond Almazan (20)	J'Nathan Bullock (11)	Beau Belga (7)	Mall of Asia Arena	5–4
10	September 20	Alaska	W 112–82	J'Nathan Bullock (14)	Norwood, Tiu (8)	Chris Tiu (5)	Ynares Center	6–4
11	September 23	Blackwater	W 122–98	J'Nathan Bullock (30)	Maverick Ahanmisi (9)	three players (5)	Smart Araneta Coliseum	7–4

2016–17 schedule

=== Playoffs ===
==== Bracket ====
Quarterfinals (Top 4 twice-to-beat)
1	Meralco	91	104
8	Blackwater	92	96
4	Star	89
5	NLEX	77
2	TNT	102	118
7	Rain or Shine	106	114
3	Barangay Ginebra	104
6	San Miguel	84

Semifinals (Best-of-5)
1	Meralco	3
4	Star	0
2	TNT	1
3	Barangay Ginebra	3

Finals (Best-of-7)
1	Meralco	3
3	Barangay Ginebra	4

==== Game log ====
2017 PBA Governors' Cup playoffs game log
Total: 1–1
Quarterfinals: 1–1

Game	Date	Opponent	Score	High points	High rebounds	High assists	Location Attendance	Record
1	September 27	TNT	W 106–102	J'Nathan Bullock (31)	J'Nathan Bullock (15)	Gabe Norwood (6)	Mall of Asia Arena	1–0
2	September 29	TNT	L 114–118	J'Nathan Bullock (30)	Maverick Ahanmisi (12)	Maverick Ahanmisi (8)	Smart Araneta Coliseum	1–1

2016–17 schedule

== Transactions ==
=== Free agency ===
Player	Date signed	Contract amount	Contract length	Former team
Billy Robles	2016	Not disclosed	Not disclosed	None

=== Trades ===
Off-season

Philippine Cup

==== Governors' Cup ====
August
August 7	To Rain or Shine: Ed Daquioag	To Meralco: Mike Tolomia
August 7	To Rain or Shine: Mark Borboran; 2020 2nd Round Pick (from Phoenix)	To Phoenix: Jeff Chan

=== Recruited imports ===
Conference	Name	Country	Number	Debuted	Last game	Record
Commissioner's Cup	Shawn Taggart	(United States)	7	March 17 (vs. NLEX)	May 6 (vs. Star)	4–4
Commissioner's Cup	Duke Crews	(United States)	2	May 19 (vs. Barangay Ginebra)	June 7 (vs. Star)	1–4
Governors' Cup	J.D. Weatherspoon	(United States)	24	July 21 (vs. GlobalPort)	July 29 (vs. Meralco)	1–2
Governors' Cup	J'Nathan Bullock	(United States)	4	August 13 (vs. Kia)	September 29 (vs. TNT)	7–3

== Awards ==
Recipient	Award	Date awarded	Ref.
James Yap	Commissioner's Cup Player of the Week	March 20, 2017	
Jeff Chan	Commissioner's Cup Player of the Week	April 17, 2017	
Jericho Cruz	Commissioner's Cup Player of the Week	May 22, 2017	
Chris Tiu	Governors' Cup Player of the Week	August 25, 2017	
Gabe Norwood	Sportsmanship Award	October 20, 2017	
Honors
Gabe Norwood	All-Defensive Team	October 20, 2017	
