= 2016–17 Alaska Aces season =

- Head coach: Alex Compton
- General manager: Dickie Bachmann
- Owner: Alaska Milk Corporation

Philippine Cup results
- Record: 7–4 (63.6%)
- Place: 2nd
- Playoff finish: Quarterfinalist (lost to Barangay Ginebra with twice-to-beat advantage)

Commissioner's Cup results
- Record: 4–7 (36.4%)
- Place: 9th
- Playoff finish: Did not qualify

Governors' Cup results
- Record: 3–8 (27.3%)
- Place: 9th
- Playoff finish: Did not qualify

Alaska Aces seasons

The 2016–17 Alaska Aces season was the 31st season of the franchise in the Philippine Basketball Association (PBA).

== Key dates ==
=== 2016 ===
- October 30: The 2016 PBA draft took place at Midtown Atrium, Robinson Place Manila.

== Draft picks ==
=== Special draft ===
Player	Position	Nationality	PBA D-League team	College
Carl Bryan Cruz	F	Philippines	Cafe France Bakers	FEU

=== Regular draft ===
Alaska passed in the regular draft. They originally owned one second round and two third round picks.

== Roster ==
2016–17 Alaska Aces roster
Players
Coaches

Pos.	#	POB	Name	Height	Weight	DOB (YYYY–MM–DD)	From
G	0	(United States)	Simon Enciso	5 ft 11 in (1.80 m)	185 lb (84 kg)	1991–02–12	Notre Dame de Namur
G	2	(United States)	Chris Banchero	6 ft 1 in (1.85 m)	175 lb (79 kg)	1989–01–24	Seattle Pacific
F	4	(Philippines)	Vic Manuel	6 ft 4 in (1.93 m)	201 lb (91 kg)	1987–06–18	PSBA
C	7	(Papua New Guinea)	Sonny Thoss	6 ft 7 in (2.01 m)	205 lb (93 kg)	1981–12–07	James Cook
F	8	(Philippines)	Calvin Abueva	6 ft 2 in (1.88 m)	209 lb (95 kg)	1988–02–04	San Sebastian
F/C	9	(Philippines)	Nonoy Baclao	6 ft 5 in (1.96 m)	190 lb (86 kg)	1987–06–15	Ateneo
F/C	10	(Philippines)	Marion Magat	6 ft 7 in (2.01 m)	180 lb (82 kg)	1989–10–22	National-U
F	11	(Philippines)	Jake Pascual	6 ft 4 in (1.93 m)	200 lb (91 kg)	1988–11–11	San Beda
G	17	(Philippines)	Chris Exciminiano	6 ft 0 in (1.83 m)	185 lb (84 kg)	1988–11–17	Far Eastern
F	18	(Philippines)	Jaypee Mendoza	6 ft 3 in (1.91 m)	188 lb (85 kg)	1990–11–09	San Beda
F	21	(Philippines)	Carl Bryan Cruz (R)	6 ft 3 in (1.91 m)	179 lb (81 kg)	1991–08–21	Far Eastern
G	23	(United States)	Abel Galliguez	5 ft 9 in (1.75 m)	175 lb (79 kg)	1990–04–14	John Brown
G/F	25	(Philippines)	Dondon Hontiveros	6 ft 3 in (1.91 m)	175 lb (79 kg)	1977–06–01	Cebu
F	35	(United States)	Tony dela Cruz (C)	6 ft 5 in (1.96 m)	209 lb (95 kg)	1978–08–24	UC Irvine
G	42	(Philippines)	JVee Casio	5 ft 10 in (1.78 m)	175 lb (79 kg)	1986–09–01	De La Salle
F	61	(Philippines)	Kevin Racal	6 ft 3 in (1.91 m)	175 lb (79 kg)	1991–05–16	Letran

Head coach

- (Philippines) Alex Compton

Assistant coach(es)

- (Philippines) Louie Alas (1st Assistant)
- (Philippines) Topex Robinson
- (Philippines) Monch Gavieres
- (Philippines) Franco Atienza
- (United States) Jeffrey Cariaso
- (Philippines) Paulo Layug

Team manager

- (Philippines) Richard Bachmann^{[a]}

Legend

- (C) Team captain
- (CI) Commissioner's Cup Import
- (GI) Governors' Cup Import
- (EI) EASL Import
- (DP) Unsigned draft pick
- (FA) Free agent
- (IN) Inactive
- (S) Suspended
- (R) Rookie
- Injured

Roster

- ^{a} also serves as Alaska's board governor.

== Philippine Cup ==
=== Eliminations ===
==== Standings ====
Pos	Team	W	L	PCT	GB	Qualification
1	San Miguel Beermen	10	1	.909	—	Twice-to-beat in the quarterfinals
2	Alaska Aces	7	4	.636 (Note: Head-to-head record: Alaska 1–0 Star)	3	Twice-to-beat in the quarterfinals
3	Star Hotshots	7	4	.636	3	Best-of-three quarterfinals
4	TNT KaTropa	6	5	.545 (Note: Head-to-head quotient: TNT 1.09, GlobalPort 1.00, Phoenix 0.96, Barangay Ginebra 0.94.)	4	Best-of-three quarterfinals
5	GlobalPort Batang Pier	6	5	.545	4	Best-of-three quarterfinals
6	Phoenix Fuel Masters	6	5	.545	4	Best-of-three quarterfinals
7	Barangay Ginebra San Miguel	6	5	.545	4	Twice-to-win in the quarterfinals
8	Rain or Shine Elasto Painters	5	6	.455 (Note: Eighth seed playoff: Rain or Shine 103–80 Blackwater)	5	Twice-to-win in the quarterfinals
9	Blackwater Elite	5	6	.455	5	
10	Mahindra Floodbuster	3	8	.273 (Note: Head-to-head record: Mahindra 1–0 Meralco)	7	
11	Meralco Bolts	3	8	.273	7	
12	NLEX Road Warriors	2	9	.182	8	

Source: PBA.ph

==== Game log ====
2017 PBA Philippine Cup game log
Total: 7–4
November: 0–1

Game	Date	Opponent	Score	High points	High rebounds	High assists	Location Attendance	Record
1	November 25	NLEX	L 97–99 (OT)	Carl Bryan Cruz (20)	Carl Bryan Cruz (14)	RJ Jazul (6)	Smart Araneta Coliseum	0–1

December : 3–2

Game	Date	Opponent	Score	High points	High rebounds	High assists	Location Attendance	Record
2	December 3	San Miguel	L 88–93	JVee Casio (20)	Carl Bryan Cruz (7)	Chris Banchero (9)	Smart Araneta Coliseum	0–2
3	December 7	GlobalPort	W 95–84	Calvin Abueva (22)	Calvin Abueva (11)	Chris Banchero (8)	Mall of Asia Arena	1–2
4	December 14	Meralco	W 81–79	Vic Manuel (22)	Vic Manuel (10)	Abueva, Banchero (5)	Smart Araneta Coliseum	2–2
5	December 18	Barangay Ginebra	W 101–86	RJ Jazul (16)	Jake Pascual (8)	Banchero, Galliguez (4)	Smart Araneta Coliseum	3–2
6	December 23	TNT	L 100–109	Calvin Abueva (18)	Calvin Abueva (12)	Calvin Abueva (4)	PhilSports Arena	3–3

January : 3–1

Game	Date	Opponent	Score	High points	High rebounds	High assists	Location Attendance	Record
7	January 11	Star	W 97–90 (OT)	Vic Manuel (25)	Calvin Abueva (9)	Chris Banchero (6)	Smart Araneta Coliseum	4–3
8	January 15	Blackwater	L 100–103	Abueva, Casio (23)	Calvin Abueva (14)	Casio, Jazul (5)	Smart Araneta Coliseum	4–4
9	January 22	Mahindra	W 107–91	Vic Manuel (20)	Calvin Abueva (10)	JVee Casio (6)	PhilSports Arena	5–4
10	January 27	Phoenix	W 106–85	Vic Manuel (21)	Vic Manuel (7)	Casio, Jazul (6)	Cuneta Astrodome	6–4

February : 1–0

Game	Date	Opponent	Score	High points	High rebounds	High assists	Location Attendance	Record
11	February 1	Rain or Shine	W 94–89	JVee Casio (25)	Vic Manuel (12)	five players (2)	Cuneta Astrodome	7–4

2016–17 schedule

=== Playoffs ===
==== Bracket ====
Quarterfinals
(#1 twice-to-beat)
1	San Miguel	98
8	Rain or Shine	91
(Best-of-3)
4	TNT	2
5	GlobalPort	0
(#2 twice-to-beat)
2	Alaska	81	97
7	Barangay Ginebra	85	108
(Best-of-3)
3	Star	2
6	Phoenix	0

Semifinals (Best-of-7)
1	San Miguel	4
4	TNT	3
7	Barangay Ginebra	4
3	Star	3

Finals (Best-of-7)
1	San Miguel	4
7	Barangay Ginebra	1

==== Game log ====
2017 PBA Philippine Cup playoffs game log
Total: 0–2
Quarterfinals: 0–2

Game	Date	Opponent	Score	High points	High rebounds	High assists	Location Attendance	Series
1	February 5	Barangay Ginebra	L 81–85	Calvin Abueva (20)	Calvin Abueva (10)	JVee Casio (5)	Ynares Center	0–1
2	February 7	Barangay Ginebra	L 97–108	Calvin Abueva (29)	Calvin Abueva (13)	JVee Casio (4)	Smart Araneta Coliseum	0–2

2016–17 schedule

== Commissioner's Cup ==
=== Eliminations ===
==== Standings ====
Pos	Team	W	L	PCT	GB	Qualification
1	Barangay Ginebra San Miguel	9	2	.818 (Note: Head-to-head quotient: Barangay Ginebra 1.117, San Miguel 0.990, Star 0.903)	—	Twice-to-beat in the quarterfinals
2	San Miguel Beermen	9	2	.818	—	Twice-to-beat in the quarterfinals
3	Star Hotshots	9	2	.818	—	Best-of-three quarterfinals
4	TNT KaTropa	8	3	.727	1	Best-of-three quarterfinals
5	Meralco Bolts	7	4	.636	2	Best-of-three quarterfinals
6	Rain or Shine Elasto Painters	5	6	.455	4	Best-of-three quarterfinals
7	Phoenix Fuel Masters	4	7	.364 (Note: Head-to-head quotient: Phoenix 1.127, Alaska 1.116, GlobalPort 0.791; eighth seed playoff: GlobalPort 107–106 Alaska)	5	Twice-to-win in the quarterfinals
8	GlobalPort Batang Pier	4	7	.364	5	Twice-to-win in the quarterfinals
9	Alaska Aces	4	7	.364	5	
10	Mahindra Floodbuster	3	8	.273	6	
11	Blackwater Elite	2	9	.182 (Note: Head-to-head record: Blackwater 1–0 NLEX)	7	
12	NLEX Road Warriors	2	9	.182	7	

Source: PBA.ph

==== Game log ====
2017 PBA Commissioner's Cup game log
Total: 4–7
March: 3–0

Game	Date	Opponent	Score	High points	High rebounds	High assists	Location Attendance	Record
1	March 18	GlobalPort	W 107–79	Cory Jefferson (28)	Cory Jefferson (14)	Simon Enciso (6)	Cuneta Astrodome	1–0
2	March 22	Blackwater	W 109–95	Cory Jefferson (28)	Cory Jefferson (15)	Simon Enciso (7)	Smart Araneta Coliseum	2–0
3	March 29	Mahindra	W 98–92	Cory Jefferson (30)	Cory Jefferson (11)	Simon Enciso (5)	Mall of Asia Arena	3–0

April : 1–2

Game	Date	Opponent	Score	High points	High rebounds	High assists	Location Attendance	Record
4	April 2	Rain or Shine	W 105–102	Cory Jefferson (41)	Cory Jefferson (13)	JVee Casio (8)	Smart Araneta Coliseum	4–0
5	April 8	Meralco	L 91–99	Cory Jefferson (32)	Cory Jefferson (13)	Simon Enciso (3)	Mall of Asia Arena	4–1
6	April 21	Phoenix	L 86–94	Cory Jefferson (31)	Cory Jefferson (13)	Simon Enciso (6)	Smart Araneta Coliseum	4–2
All-Star Break

May : 0–5

Game	Date	Opponent	Score	High points	High rebounds	High assists	Location Attendance	Record
7	May 7	Barangay Ginebra	L 102–103	Cory Jefferson (25)	Cory Jefferson (18)	Simon Enciso (10)	Smart Araneta Coliseum	4–3
8	May 20	TNT	L 110–119	Cory Jefferson (29)	Abueva, Jefferson (7)	Chris Banchero (5)	Ibalong Centrum for Recreation	4–4
9	May 24	NLEX	L 92–100	Cory Jefferson (36)	Cory Jefferson (20)	Banchero, Enciso (3)	Smart Araneta Coliseum	4–5
10	May 27	San Miguel	L 97–109	Cory Jefferson (23)	Cory Jefferson (13)	Chris Banchero (8)	Ynares Center	4–6
11	May 31	Star	L 98–102 (OT)	Calvin Abueva (22)	Cory Jefferson (13)	Chris Banchero (7)	Cuneta Astrodome	4–7

2016–17 schedule

=== Playoffs ===
==== Bracket ====
Quarterfinals
(#1 twice-to-beat)
1	Barangay Ginebra	96
8	GlobalPort	85
(Best-of-3)
4	TNT	2
5	Meralco	1
(#2 twice-to-beat)
2	San Miguel	115
7	Phoenix	96
(Best-of-3)
3	Star	2
6	Rain or Shine	0

Semifinals (Best-of-5)
1	Barangay Ginebra	1
4	TNT	3
2	San Miguel	3
3	Star	1

Finals (Best-of-7)
4	TNT	2
2	San Miguel	4

==== Game log ====
2017 PBA Commissioner's Cup playoffs game log
Total: 0–1
8th seed playoff: 0–1

Game	Date	Opponent	Score	High points	High rebounds	High assists	Location Attendance	Series
1	June 4	GlobalPort	L 106–107	Cory Jefferson (32)	Cory Jefferson (16)	Chris Exciminiano (4)	Mall of Asia Arena	0–1

2016–17 schedule

== Governors' Cup ==
=== Eliminations ===
==== Standings ====
Pos	Team	W	L	PCT	GB	Qualification
1	Meralco Bolts	9	2	.818	—	Twice-to-beat in the quarterfinals
2	TNT KaTropa	8	3	.727 (Note: Head-to-head record: Talk 'N Text 1–0 Barangay Ginebra)	1	Twice-to-beat in the quarterfinals
3	Barangay Ginebra San Miguel	8	3	.727	1	Twice-to-beat in the quarterfinals
4	Star Hotshots	7	4	.636 (Note: Head to-head quotient: Star 1.04, NLEX 1.01, San Miguel 0.99, Rain or Shine 0.96)	2	Twice-to-beat in the quarterfinals
5	NLEX Road Warriors	7	4	.636	2	Twice-to-win in the quarterfinals
6	San Miguel Beermen	7	4	.636	2	Twice-to-win in the quarterfinals
7	Rain or Shine Elasto Painters	7	4	.636	2	Twice-to-win in the quarterfinals
8	Blackwater Elite	5	6	.455	4	Twice-to-win in the quarterfinals
9	Alaska Aces	3	8	.273 (Note: Head-to-head record: Alaska 1–0 GlobalPort)	6	
10	GlobalPort Batang Pier	3	8	.273	6	
11	Phoenix Fuel Masters	2	9	.182	7	
12	Kia Picanto	0	11	.000	9	

Source: PBA.ph

==== Game log ====
2017 PBA Governors' Cup game log
Total: 3–8
July: 0–3

Game	Date	Opponent	Score	High points	High rebounds	High assists	Location Attendance	Record
1	July 19	NLEX	L 104–112	LaDontae Henton (27)	Calvin Abueva (14)	Chris Banchero (8)	Smart Araneta Coliseum	0–1
2	July 22	Phoenix	L 93–95	LaDontae Henton (30)	LaDontae Henton (10)	Abueva, Enciso (5)	Mall of Asia Arena	0–2
3	July 28	Star	L 92–101	LaDontae Henton (34)	Chris Banchero (7)	Chris Banchero (6)	Ynares Center	0–3

August : 0–3

Game	Date	Opponent	Score	High points	High rebounds	High assists	Location Attendance	Record
4	August 4	TNT	L 106–107	LaDontae Henton (42)	LaDontae Henton (22)	four players (2)	Smart Araneta Coliseum	0–4
5	August 23	Blackwater	L 106–111 (2OT)	LaDontae Henton (31)	LaDontae Henton (10)	Casio, Mendoza (6)	Smart Araneta Coliseum	0–5
6	August 26	Barangay Ginebra	L 80–94	Calvin Abueva (22)	Calvin Abueva (13)	JVee Casio (4)	Hoops Dome	0–6

September: 3–2

Game	Date	Opponent	Score	High points	High rebounds	High assists	Location Attendance	Record
7	September 2	San Miguel	W 90–79	LaDontae Henton (36)	LaDontae Henton (15)	JVee Casio (7)	Angeles University Foundation Sports Arena	1–6
8	September 8	GlobalPort	W 101–88	LaDontae Henton (36)	LaDontae Henton (21)	Casio, Enciso (5)	Mall of Asia Arena	2–6
9	September 10	Kia	W 102–94	Calvin Abueva (26)	Calvin Abueva (15)	Casio, Henton (7)	Smart Araneta Coliseum	3–6
10	September 15	Meralco	L 78–106	LaDontae Henton (23)	Calvin Abueva (11)	five players (2)	Smart Araneta Coliseum	3–7
11	September 20	Rain or Shine	L 82–112	LaDontae Henton (20)	LaDontae Henton (7)	Baclao, Enciso (4)	Ynares Center	3–8

2016–17 schedule

== Transactions ==
=== Recruited imports ===
Conference	Name	Country	Number	Debuted	Last game	Record
Commissioner's Cup	Cory Jefferson	(United States)	34	March 18 (vs. GlobalPort)	June 4 (vs. GlobalPort)	4–8
Governors' Cup	LaDontae Henton	(United States)	19	July 19 (vs. NLEX)	September 20 (vs. Rain or Shine)	3–8

== Awards ==
Recipient	Award	Date awarded	Ref.
Vic Manuel	Philippine Cup Player of the Week	December 19, 2016	
Sonny Thoss	Commissioner's Cup Player of the Week	April 3, 2017	
