= John Pinto (basketball) =

Filipino basketball player (born 1990)

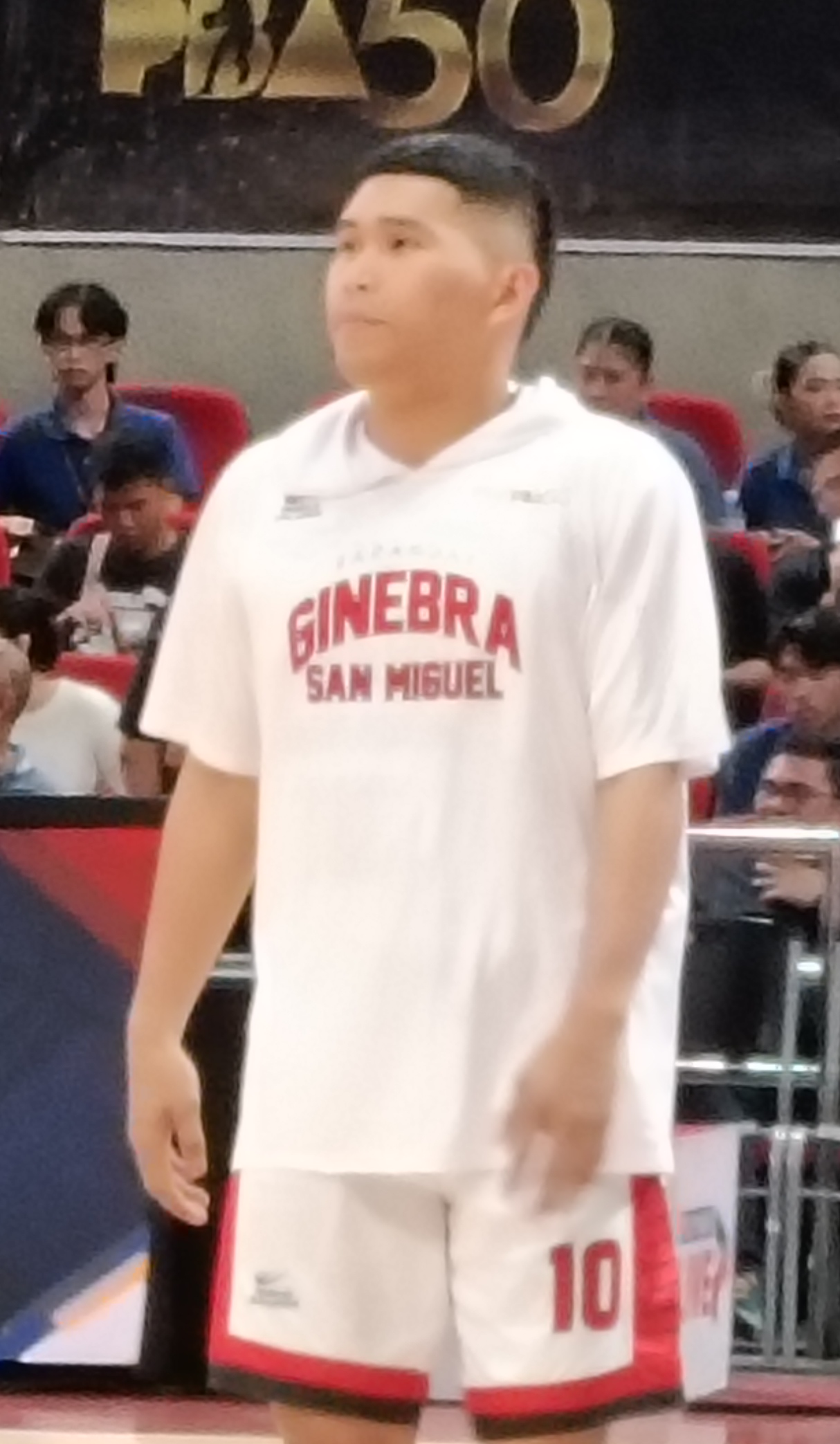
- Pinto in 2025

No. 10 – Barangay Ginebra San Miguel
- Position: Point guard / shooting guard
- League: PBA

Personal information
- Born: October 15, 1990 (age 36) Davao City, Philippines
- Listed height: 5 ft 11 in (1.80 m)
- Listed weight: 170 lb (77 kg)

Career information
- High school: Holy Child College of Davao (Davao City)
- College: Arellano
- PBA draft: 2014: 2nd round, 19th overall pick
- Drafted by: GlobalPort Batang Pier
- Playing career: 2014–present

Career history
- 2014–2015: GlobalPort Batang Pier
- 2015–2016: Mahindra Enforcer
- 2016–2018: Blackwater Elite
- 2019–2021: Meralco Bolts
- 2022–present: Barangay Ginebra San Miguel

Career highlights
- 3× PBA champion (2021 Governors', 2022–23 Commissioner's, 2026 Commissioner's); 2× PBA All-Star (2023, 2024)

Nard John "Nards" V. Pinto (born October 15, 1990) is a Filipino professional basketball player for the Barangay Ginebra San Miguel of the Philippine Basketball Association (PBA).

== Professional career ==
Pinto was drafted 19th overall by the GlobalPort Batang Pier in the 2014 PBA draft.

In 2015, he joined the Mahindra Enforcer.

In September 2016, he joined the Blackwater Elite after becoming an unrestricted free agent.

On January 7, 2019, he was traded to the Phoenix Pulse Fuel Masters for Joseph Eriobu. However, before appearing in a game with the Fuel Masters, on January 12, he was traded to the Meralco Bolts for Jason Ballesteros and a 2020 second-round pick. The day after, he signed a two-year contract extension with the Bolts.

On January 1, 2022, Pinto became an unrestricted free agent. On January 7, he signed a three-year deal with the Barangay Ginebra San Miguel after declining a contract extension with the Bolts.

== PBA career statistics ==
Legend
GP	Games played	MPG	Minutes per game	FG%	Field-goal percentage
3FG%	3-point field-goal percentage	4P%	4-point field-goal percentage	FT%	Free-throw percentage
RPG	Rebounds per game	APG	Assists per game	SPG	Steals per game
BPG	Blocks per game	PPG	Points per game	127	Career high

As of the end of 2024–25 season

=== Season-by-season averages ===
Year	Team	GP	MPG	FG%	3P%	4P%	FT%	RPG	APG	SPG	BPG	PPG
2014–15	GlobalPort	21	5.7	.355	.182	—	.286	1.4	.7	.2	—	1.2
2015–16	Mahindra	32	17.4	.391	.206	—	.643	2.6	2.6	.6	.1	3.9
2015–16	Blackwater	32	17.4	.391	.206	—	.643	2.6	2.6	.6	.1	3.9
2016–17	Blackwater	34	21.5	.424	.356	—	.520	3.1	3.4	.6	.1	6.3
2017–18	Blackwater	34	23.0	.485	.517	—	.605	3.2	4.3	1.0	.1	6.6
2019	Meralco	41	13.0	.357	.316	—	.731	1.6	1.3	.5	.0	3.5
2020	Meralco	17	10.3	.229	.125	—	.385	1.3	1.1	.4	—	1.8
2021	Meralco	40	22.9	.393	.342	—	.659	3.0	2.3	.7	.1	6.9
2021	Barangay Ginebra	40	22.9	.393	.342	—	.659	3.0	2.3	.7	.1	6.9
2022–23	Barangay Ginebra	51	16.5	.392	.330	—	.723	2.5	2.4	.7	.0	4.8
2023–24	Barangay Ginebra	30	14.4	.405	.400	—	.737	2.3	1.2	.4	.0	3.3
2024–25	Barangay Ginebra	42	7.5	.427	.395	—	.769	1.0	.9	.1	—	2.1
Career		342	15.8	.401	.344	—	.631	2.3	2.1	.5	.0	4.3
