= 2016–17 NLEX Road Warriors season =

- Head coach: Yeng Guiao
- Owners: Metro Pacific Investments Corporation (an MVP Group subsidiary)

Philippine Cup results
- Record: 2–9 (18.2%)
- Place: 12th
- Playoff finish: Did not qualify

Commissioner's Cup results
- Record: 2–9 (18.2%)
- Place: 12th
- Playoff finish: Did not qualify

Governors' Cup results
- Record: 7–4 (63.6%)
- Place: 5th
- Playoff finish: Quarterfinalist (lost to Star with twice-to-win disadvantage)

NLEX Road Warriors seasons

The 2016–17 NLEX Road Warriors season was the 3rd season of the franchise in the Philippine Basketball Association (PBA).

== Key dates ==
=== 2016 ===
- October 30: The 2016 PBA draft took place at Midtown Atrium, Robinson Place Manila.

== Draft picks ==
=== Special draft ===
Player	Position	Nationality	PBA D-League team	College
Alfonzo Gotladera	C/F	Philippines	Tanduay Light Rhum Masters	Ateneo

=== Regular draft ===
Round	Pick	Player	Position	Nationality	PBA D-League team	College
2	8	Reden Celda	G	Philippines	Tanduay Light Rhum Masters	NU

== Roster ==
2016–17 NLEX Road Warriors roster
Players
Coaches

Pos.	#	POB	Name	Height	Weight	DOB (YYYY–MM–DD)	From
G	1	(Philippines)	Emman Monfort	5 ft 7 in (1.70 m)	132 lb (60 kg)	1989–07–02	Ateneo
G	3	(Philippines)	Juami Tiongson	5 ft 10 in (1.78 m)	175 lb (79 kg)	1991–02–05	Ateneo
F	5	(Philippines)	Jansen Rios	6 ft 3 in (1.91 m)	185 lb (84 kg)	1991–10–28	Adamson
G	6	(Philippines)	Kevin Alas	6 ft 0 in (1.83 m)	175 lb (79 kg)	1991–11–13	Letran
G	8	(Philippines)	Cyrus Baguio	6 ft 2 in (1.88 m)	180 lb (82 kg)	1980–08–19	UST
G	9	(Philippines)	Carlo Lastimosa	6 ft 0 in (1.83 m)	182 lb (83 kg)	1990–09–03	St. Benilde
G	11	(Philippines)	Jonas Villanueva	6 ft 0 in (1.83 m)	170 lb (77 kg)	1983–03–31	Far Eastern
G/F	12	(Philippines)	Larry Fonacier	6 ft 2 in (1.88 m)	170 lb (77 kg)	1982–05–13	Ateneo
F/C	14	(Philippines)	Enrico Villanueva	6 ft 5 in (1.96 m)	210 lb (95 kg)	1980–06–23	Ateneo
C	16	(Philippines)	Raul Soyud	6 ft 5 in (1.96 m)	220 lb (100 kg)	1991–01–14	Philippines
F	17	(Philippines)	Kenneth Ighalo	6 ft 2 in (1.88 m)	175 lb (79 kg)	1989–01–11	Mapúa
C	19	(Philippines)	Rabeh Al-Hussaini	6 ft 7 in (2.01 m)	220 lb (100 kg)	1988–08–11	Ateneo
G/F	20	(United States)	Alex Mallari	6 ft 4 in (1.93 m)	176 lb (80 kg)	1987–03–26	Lewis–Clark State
F/C	21	(Philippines)	Alfonzo Gotladera (R)	6 ft 5 in (1.96 m)	203 lb (92 kg)	1992–02–16	Ateneo
F/C	37	(Philippines)	J. R. Quiñahan	6 ft 5 in (1.96 m)	235 lb (107 kg)	1984–05–08	Visayas
C	88	(Tonga)	Asi Taulava (C)	6 ft 8 in (2.03 m)	245 lb (111 kg)	1973–03–02	BYU–Hawaii

Head coach

- (Philippines) Yeng Guiao

Assistant coach(es)

- (Philippines) Adonis Tierra (1st Assistant)
- (Philippines) Jojo Lastimosa
- (Philippines) Sandy Arespacochaga
- (Philippines) Raymond Celis
- (Philippines) Claiford Arao
- (Philippines) Gino Manuel
- (Philippines) Jaime Serrano

Team manager

- (Philippines) Ronald Dulatre

Legend

- (C) Team captain
- (CI) Commissioner's Cup Import
- (GI) Governors' Cup Import
- (EI) EASL Import
- (DP) Unsigned draft pick
- (FA) Free agent
- (IN) Inactive
- (S) Suspended
- (R) Rookie
- Injured

Roster

== Philippine Cup ==
=== Eliminations ===
==== Standings ====
Pos	Team	W	L	PCT	GB	Qualification
1	San Miguel Beermen	10	1	.909	—	Twice-to-beat in the quarterfinals
2	Alaska Aces	7	4	.636 (Note: Head-to-head record: Alaska 1–0 Star)	3	Twice-to-beat in the quarterfinals
3	Star Hotshots	7	4	.636	3	Best-of-three quarterfinals
4	TNT KaTropa	6	5	.545 (Note: Head-to-head quotient: TNT 1.09, GlobalPort 1.00, Phoenix 0.96, Barangay Ginebra 0.94.)	4	Best-of-three quarterfinals
5	GlobalPort Batang Pier	6	5	.545	4	Best-of-three quarterfinals
6	Phoenix Fuel Masters	6	5	.545	4	Best-of-three quarterfinals
7	Barangay Ginebra San Miguel	6	5	.545	4	Twice-to-win in the quarterfinals
8	Rain or Shine Elasto Painters	5	6	.455 (Note: Eighth seed playoff: Rain or Shine 103–80 Blackwater)	5	Twice-to-win in the quarterfinals
9	Blackwater Elite	5	6	.455	5	
10	Mahindra Floodbuster	3	8	.273 (Note: Head-to-head record: Mahindra 1–0 Meralco)	7	
11	Meralco Bolts	3	8	.273	7	
12	NLEX Road Warriors	2	9	.182	8	

Source: PBA.ph

==== Game log ====
2017 PBA Philippine Cup game log
Total: 2–9
November: 1–0

Game	Date	Opponent	Score	High points	High rebounds	High assists	Location Attendance	Record
1	November 25	Alaska	W 99–97 (OT)	Sean Anthony (21)	Sean Anthony (14)	Jonas Villanueva (5)	Smart Araneta Coliseum	1–0

December: 0–5

Game	Date	Opponent	Score	High points	High rebounds	High assists	Location Attendance	Record
2	December 3	Meralco	L 93–106	Sean Anthony (15)	Anthony, Soyud (8)	Garvo Lanete (7)	Smart Araneta Coliseum	1–1
3	December 7	Star	L 75–99	Lastimosa, J. Villanueva (11)	Sean Anthony (6)	four players (2)	Mall of Asia Arena	1–2
4	December 14	Blackwater	L 85–96	Carlo Lastimosa (23)	Sean Anthony (11)	Kevin Alas (8)	Smart Araneta Coliseum	1–3
5	December 17	San Miguel	L 80–106	Alas, Guinto, J. Villanueva (12)	Sean Anthony (11)	Jonas Villanueva (5)	Xavier University Gym	1–4
6	December 23	Rain or Shine	L 97–107	Sean Anthony (22)	Sean Anthony (16)	Jonas Villanueva (6)	PhilSports Arena	1–5

January: 1–4

Game	Date	Opponent	Score	High points	High rebounds	High assists	Location Attendance	Record
7	January 7	TNT	W 110–98	Carlo Lastimosa (22)	Sean Anthony (13)	Jonas Villanueva (7)	Angeles University Foundation Sports Arena	2–5
8	January 13	GlobalPort	L 96–110	Carlo Lastimosa (19)	Raul Soyud (14)	Carlo Lastimosa (6)	Mall of Asia Arena	2–6
9	January 18	Phoenix	L 91–102	Sean Anthony (23)	Sean Anthony (8)	Jonas Villanueva (4)	Cuneta Astrodome	2–7
10	January 27	Mahindra	L 96–106	Eric Camson (17)	Bradwyn Guinto (7)	Emman Monfort (5)	Cuneta Astrodome	2–8
11	January 29	Barangay Ginebra	L 80–90	Alas, E. Villanueva (14)	Bradwyn Guinto (10)	Camson, Lanete (3)	Cuneta Astrodome	2–9

2016–17 schedule

== Commissioner's Cup ==
=== Eliminations ===
==== Standings ====
Pos	Team	W	L	PCT	GB	Qualification
1	Barangay Ginebra San Miguel	9	2	.818 (Note: Head-to-head quotient: Barangay Ginebra 1.117, San Miguel 0.990, Star 0.903)	—	Twice-to-beat in the quarterfinals
2	San Miguel Beermen	9	2	.818	—	Twice-to-beat in the quarterfinals
3	Star Hotshots	9	2	.818	—	Best-of-three quarterfinals
4	TNT KaTropa	8	3	.727	1	Best-of-three quarterfinals
5	Meralco Bolts	7	4	.636	2	Best-of-three quarterfinals
6	Rain or Shine Elasto Painters	5	6	.455	4	Best-of-three quarterfinals
7	Phoenix Fuel Masters	4	7	.364 (Note: Head-to-head quotient: Phoenix 1.127, Alaska 1.116, GlobalPort 0.791; eighth seed playoff: GlobalPort 107–106 Alaska)	5	Twice-to-win in the quarterfinals
8	GlobalPort Batang Pier	4	7	.364	5	Twice-to-win in the quarterfinals
9	Alaska Aces	4	7	.364	5	
10	Mahindra Floodbuster	3	8	.273	6	
11	Blackwater Elite	2	9	.182 (Note: Head-to-head record: Blackwater 1–0 NLEX)	7	
12	NLEX Road Warriors	2	9	.182	7	

Source: PBA.ph

==== Game log ====
2017 PBA Commissioner's Cup game log
Total: 2–9
March: 0–4

Game	Date	Opponent	Score	High points	High rebounds	High assists	Location Attendance	Record
1	March 17	Rain or Shine	L 105–113	Wayne Chism (27)	Wayne Chism (21)	Asi Taulava (4)	Smart Araneta Coliseum	0–1
2	March 19	Meralco	L 84–91	Wayne Chism (18)	Wayne Chism (17)	Sean Anthony (4)	Smart Araneta Coliseum	0–2
3	March 24	Mahindra	L 81–89	Wayne Chism (28)	Wayne Chism (21)	Jansen Rios (4)	Smart Araneta Coliseum	0–3
4	March 31	Star	L 103–105	Wayne Chism (33)	Wayne Chism (19)	Wayne Chism (5)	Smart Araneta Coliseum	0–4

April: 0–3

Game	Date	Opponent	Score	High points	High rebounds	High assists	Location Attendance	Record
5	April 7	TNT	L 121–126 (OT)	Wayne Chism (35)	Wayne Chism (21)	Jonas Villanueva (5)	Mall of Asia Arena	0–5
6	April 12	GlobalPort	L 82–85	Wayne Chism (29)	Wayne Chism (14)	Emman Monfort (4)	Smart Araneta Coliseum	0–6
7	April 19	Barangay Ginebra	L 92–101	Wayne Chism (16)	Wayne Chism (8)	Anthony, Monfort (3)	Cuneta Astrodome	0–7
All-Star Break

May: 2–2

Game	Date	Opponent	Score	High points	High rebounds	High assists	Location Attendance	Record
8	May 3	Blackwater	L 98–104	Kevin Alas (18)	Wayne Chism (15)	Chism, J. Villanueva (3)	Smart Araneta Coliseum	0–8
9	May 19	San Miguel	L 108–114	Wayne Chism (22)	Alas, Al-Hussaini, Mallari (7)	Kevin Alas (6)	Cuneta Astrodome	0–9
10	May 24	Alaska	W 100–92	Wayne Chism (22)	Alex Mallari (8)	Monfort, Quiñahan, Tiongson (4)	Smart Araneta Coliseum	1–9
11	May 27	Phoenix	W 116–114	Alex Mallari (22)	Wayne Chism (13)	Chism, Mallari (5)	Ynares Center	2–9

2016–17 schedule

== Governors' Cup ==
=== Eliminations ===
==== Standings ====
Pos	Team	W	L	PCT	GB	Qualification
1	Meralco Bolts	9	2	.818	—	Twice-to-beat in the quarterfinals
2	TNT KaTropa	8	3	.727 (Note: Head-to-head record: Talk 'N Text 1–0 Barangay Ginebra)	1	Twice-to-beat in the quarterfinals
3	Barangay Ginebra San Miguel	8	3	.727	1	Twice-to-beat in the quarterfinals
4	Star Hotshots	7	4	.636 (Note: Head to-head quotient: Star 1.04, NLEX 1.01, San Miguel 0.99, Rain or Shine 0.96)	2	Twice-to-beat in the quarterfinals
5	NLEX Road Warriors	7	4	.636	2	Twice-to-win in the quarterfinals
6	San Miguel Beermen	7	4	.636	2	Twice-to-win in the quarterfinals
7	Rain or Shine Elasto Painters	7	4	.636	2	Twice-to-win in the quarterfinals
8	Blackwater Elite	5	6	.455	4	Twice-to-win in the quarterfinals
9	Alaska Aces	3	8	.273 (Note: Head-to-head record: Alaska 1–0 GlobalPort)	6	
10	GlobalPort Batang Pier	3	8	.273	6	
11	Phoenix Fuel Masters	2	9	.182	7	
12	Kia Picanto	0	11	.000	9	

Source: PBA.ph

==== Game log ====
2017 PBA Governors' Cup game log
Total: 7–4
July: 4–0

Game	Date	Opponent	Score	High points	High rebounds	High assists	Location Attendance	Record
1	July 19	Alaska	W 112–104	Aaron Fuller (30)	Aaron Fuller (20)	Alas, Rios (4)	Smart Araneta Coliseum	1–0
2	July 22	Kia	W 100–93	Aaron Fuller (24)	Aaron Fuller (19)	Larry Fonacier (4)	Smart Araneta Coliseum	2–0
3	July 26	Rain or Shine	W 122–114 (2OT)	Aaron Fuller (33)	Aaron Fuller (20)	Larry Fonacier (7)	Smart Araneta Coliseum	3–0
4	July 30	Phoenix	W 95–91	Aaron Fuller (18)	Aaron Fuller (24)	Fonacier, Mallari (3)	Smart Araneta Coliseum	4–0

August: 2–2

Game	Date	Opponent	Score	High points	High rebounds	High assists	Location Attendance	Record
5	August 5	Barangay Ginebra	L 97–110	Aaron Fuller (20)	Aaron Fuller (17)	Alex Mallari (6)	Calasiao Sports Complex	4–1
6	August 13	Meralco	W 100–94	Aaron Fuller (25)	Aaron Fuller (18)	Kevin Alas (4)	Mall of Asia Arena	5–1
7	August 18	Blackwater	L 106–107	Kevin Alas (19)	Alas, Fuller (11)	Larry Fonacier (4)	Smart Araneta Coliseum	5–2
8	August 27	San Miguel	W 103–100	Aaron Fuller (26)	Aaron Fuller (22)	Alex Mallari (5)	Smart Araneta Coliseum	6–2

September: 1–2

Game	Date	Opponent	Score	High points	High rebounds	High assists	Location Attendance	Record
9	September 3	GlobalPort	W 109–99	Aaron Fuller (33)	Aaron Fuller (20)	Cyrus Baguio (5)	Smart Araneta Coliseum	7–2
10	September 13	TNT	L 107–112	Aaron Fuller (28)	Aaron Fuller (18)	Alas, Mallari (5)	Ynares Center	7–3
11	September 24	Star	L 93–101	Aaron Fuller (16)	Aaron Fuller (17)	Alas, Mallari (4)	Smart Araneta Coliseum	7–4

2016–17 schedule

=== Playoffs ===
==== Bracket ====
Quarterfinals (Top 4 twice-to-beat)
1	Meralco	91	104
8	Blackwater	92	96
4	Star	89
5	NLEX	77
2	TNT	102	118
7	Rain or Shine	106	114
3	Barangay Ginebra	104
6	San Miguel	84

Semifinals (Best-of-5)
1	Meralco	3
4	Star	0
2	TNT	1
3	Barangay Ginebra	3

Finals (Best-of-7)
1	Meralco	3
3	Barangay Ginebra	4

==== Game log ====
2017 PBA Governors' Cup playoffs game log
Total: 0–1
Quarterfinals: 0–1

Game	Date	Opponent	Score	High points	High rebounds	High assists	Location Attendance	Record
1	September 26	Star	L 77–89	Aaron Fuller (16)	Aaron Fuller (9)	Larry Fonacier (4)	Mall of Asia Arena	0–1

2016–17 schedule

== Transactions ==
=== Trades ===
==== Commissioner's Cup ====
March 2017
March 28	Three-team trade
March 28	To NLEX: Rabeh Al-Hussaini (from Meralco)	To Blackwater: 2017 Second Round pick (from NLEX)
March 28	To Meralco: 2018 Second Round pick (from Blackwater)
May 2017
May 6	Four-team trade
May 6	To NLEX: Larry Fonacier (from TNT); J.R. Quiñahan (from GlobalPort); 2017 Second Round pick (from Meralco, originally from Mahindra); 2019 Second Round pick (from GlobalPort)	To GlobalPort: Sean Anthony (from NLEX); Bradwyn Guinto (from NLEX); Jonathan Grey (from Meralco)
May 6	To TNT: Anthony Semerad (from GlobalPort); 2017 First Round Pick (from GlobalPort, originally from TNT)	To Meralco: Garvo Lanete (from NLEX)

=== Recruited imports ===
Conference	Name	Country	Number	Debuted	Last game	Record
Commissioner's Cup	Wayne Chism	(United States)	4	March 17 (vs. Rain or Shine)	May 27 (vs. Phoenix)	2–9
Governors' Cup	Aaron Fuller	(United States)	23	July 19 (vs. Alaska)	September 26 (vs. Star)	7–5

== Awards ==
Recipient	Award	Date awarded	Ref.
Kevin Alas	Governors' Cup Player of the Week	July 24, 2017	
Larry Fonacier	Governors' Cup Player of the Week	August 28, 2017	
Juami Tiongson	Governors' Cup Player of the Week	September 4, 2017	
