= 2016–17 Blackwater Elite season =

- Head coach: Leo Isaac
- Owners: Ever Bilena Cosmetics, Inc.

Philippine Cup results
- Record: 5–6 (45.5%)
- Place: 9th
- Playoff finish: Did not qualify

Commissioner's Cup results
- Record: 2–9 (18.2%)
- Place: 11th
- Playoff finish: Did not qualify

Governors' Cup results
- Record: 5–6 (45.5%)
- Place: 8th
- Playoff finish: Quarterfinalist (lost to Meralco with twice-to-win disadvantage)

Blackwater Elite seasons

The 2016–17 Blackwater Elite season was the 3rd season of the franchise in the Philippine Basketball Association (PBA).

== Key dates ==
=== 2016 ===
- October 30: The 2016 PBA draft took place at Midtown Atrium, Robinson Place Manila.

== Draft picks ==
=== Special draft ===
Player	Position	Nationality	PBA D-League team	College
Mac Belo	F	Philippines	Phoenix Accelerators	FEU

=== Regular draft ===
Round	Pick	Player	Position	Nationality	PBA D-League team	College
2	1	Raphael Banal	G	Philippines	Racal Tile Masters	Hope International
3	11	Tristan Perez	C/F	Philippines	BDO-National University	NU

== Roster ==
2016–17 Blackwater Elite roster
Players
Coaches

Pos.	#	POB	Name	Height	Weight	DOB (YYYY–MM–DD)	From
G	1	(United States)	Michael DiGregorio	6 ft 1 in (1.85 m)	185 lb (84 kg)	1990–12–12	McKendree
F	2	(Philippines)	Mac Belo (R)	6 ft 4 in (1.93 m)	185 lb (84 kg)	1993–02–12	Far Eastern
G	3	(Philippines)	Denok Miranda	5 ft 11 in (1.80 m)	195 lb (88 kg)	1982–07–14	Far Eastern
G	6	(Philippines)	Raphael Banal (R)	6 ft 2 in (1.88 m)	190 lb (86 kg)	1992–10–28	Hope International
C	7	(Philippines)	Poy Erram	6 ft 8 in (2.03 m)	227 lb (103 kg)	1989–07–07	Ateneo
F	9	(Philippines)	KG Canaleta	6 ft 6 in (1.98 m)	200 lb (91 kg)	1982–02–12	UE
G	10	(Philippines)	John Pinto	5 ft 10 in (1.78 m)	195 lb (88 kg)	1990–10–15	Arellano
G	12	(Philippines)	Roi Sumang	5 ft 8 in (1.73 m)	155 lb (70 kg)	1990–12–12	UE
F	15	(Philippines)	James Sena	6 ft 4 in (1.93 m)	225 lb (102 kg)	1988–08–31	José Rizal
F/C	17	(Philippines)	Chris Javier (R)	6 ft 4 in (1.93 m)	200 lb (91 kg)	1992–12–06	UE
G/F	18	(Philippines)	Allein Maliksi	6 ft 4 in (1.93 m)	180 lb (82 kg)	1987–09–18	UST
F/C	22	(Philippines)	Dave Marcelo	6 ft 5 in (1.96 m)	223 lb (101 kg)	1989–02–22	San Beda
F	26	(Philippines)	Reil Cervantes (C)	6 ft 4 in (1.93 m)	198 lb (90 kg)	1986–08–16	Far Eastern
G	30	(Philippines)	Mark Cruz	5 ft 6 in (1.68 m)	150 lb (68 kg)	1992–07–27	Letran

Head coach

- (Philippines) Leo Isaac

Assistant coach(es)

- (Philippines) Aris Dimaunahan (1st Assistant)
- (Philippines) Bong Ramos
- (Philippines) Rodil Sablan
- (Philippines) Patrick Aquino
- (Philippines) Junjie Ablan
- (United States) Vince Hizon (Consultant)

Team manager

- (Philippines) Johnson Martines

Legend

- (C) Team captain
- (CI) Commissioner's Cup Import
- (GI) Governors' Cup Import
- (EI) EASL Import
- (DP) Unsigned draft pick
- (FA) Free agent
- (IN) Inactive
- (S) Suspended
- (R) Rookie
- Injured

Roster

== Philippine Cup ==
=== Eliminations ===
==== Standings ====
Pos	Team	W	L	PCT	GB	Qualification
1	San Miguel Beermen	10	1	.909	—	Twice-to-beat in the quarterfinals
2	Alaska Aces	7	4	.636 (Note: Head-to-head record: Alaska 1–0 Star)	3	Twice-to-beat in the quarterfinals
3	Star Hotshots	7	4	.636	3	Best-of-three quarterfinals
4	TNT KaTropa	6	5	.545 (Note: Head-to-head quotient: TNT 1.09, GlobalPort 1.00, Phoenix 0.96, Barangay Ginebra 0.94.)	4	Best-of-three quarterfinals
5	GlobalPort Batang Pier	6	5	.545	4	Best-of-three quarterfinals
6	Phoenix Fuel Masters	6	5	.545	4	Best-of-three quarterfinals
7	Barangay Ginebra San Miguel	6	5	.545	4	Twice-to-win in the quarterfinals
8	Rain or Shine Elasto Painters	5	6	.455 (Note: Eighth seed playoff: Rain or Shine 103–80 Blackwater)	5	Twice-to-win in the quarterfinals
9	Blackwater Elite	5	6	.455	5	
10	Mahindra Floodbuster	3	8	.273 (Note: Head-to-head record: Mahindra 1–0 Meralco)	7	
11	Meralco Bolts	3	8	.273	7	
12	NLEX Road Warriors	2	9	.182	8	

Source: PBA.ph

==== Game log ====
2017 PBA Philippine Cup game log
Total: 5–6
November: 2–0

Game	Date	Opponent	Score	High points	High rebounds	High assists	Location Attendance	Record
1	November 23	Phoenix	W 94–87	Mac Belo (17)	Arthur dela Cruz (10)	John Pinto (7)	Smart Araneta Coliseum	1–0
2	November 27	Meralco	W 86–84	Mac Belo (25)	Raymond Aguilar (7)	Denok Miranda (7)	Smart Araneta Coliseum	2–0

December : 2–3

Game	Date	Opponent	Score	High points	High rebounds	High assists	Location Attendance	Record
3	December 2	TNT	L 92–99	Mac Belo (21)	Belo, dela Cruz (9)	dela Cruz, Pinto (6)	Smart Araneta Coliseum	2–1
4	December 9	Rain or Shine	L 93–107	Raymond Aguilar (15)	Mac Belo (9)	Denok Miranda (5)	Smart Araneta Coliseum	2–2
5	December 14	NLEX	W 96–85	Arthur dela Cruz (18)	John Pinto (13)	Belo, Buenafe (5)	Smart Araneta Coliseum	3–2
6	December 21	GlobalPort	W 99–91	Mac Belo (20)	Buenafe, Belo (6)	John Pinto (6)	Filoil Flying V Centre	4–2
7	December 25	Mahindra	L 93–97 (OT)	Arthur dela Cruz (18)	Mac Belo (9)	John Pinto (7)	Philippine Arena	4–3

January : 1–3

Game	Date	Opponent	Score	High points	High rebounds	High assists	Location Attendance	Record
8	January 6	San Miguel	L 93–118	Arthur dela Cruz (16)	John Pinto (10)	John Pinto (7)	Mall of Asia Arena	4–4
9	January 15	Alaska	W 103–100	Mac Belo (21)	Mac Belo (7)	John Pinto (5)	Smart Araneta Coliseum	5–4
10	January 20	Barangay Ginebra	L 90–99	Roi Sumang (20)	Arthur dela Cruz (12)	Arthur dela Cruz (5)	Cuneta Astrodome	5–5
11	January 25	Star	L 95–111	Arthur dela Cruz (23)	James Sena (11)	John Pinto (7)	Cuneta Astrodome	5–6

2016–17 schedule

=== Playoffs ===
==== Bracket ====
Quarterfinals
(#1 twice-to-beat)
1	San Miguel	98
8	Rain or Shine	91
(Best-of-3)
4	TNT	2
5	GlobalPort	0
(#2 twice-to-beat)
2	Alaska	81	97
7	Barangay Ginebra	85	108
(Best-of-3)
3	Star	2
6	Phoenix	0

Semifinals (Best-of-7)
1	San Miguel	4
4	TNT	3
7	Barangay Ginebra	4
3	Star	3

Finals (Best-of-7)
1	San Miguel	4
7	Barangay Ginebra	1

==== Game log ====
2017 PBA Philippine Cup playoffs game log
Total: 0–1
8th seed playoff: 0–1

Game	Date	Opponent	Score	High points	High rebounds	High assists	Location Attendance	Series
1	February 3	Rain or Shine	L 80–103	Arthur dela Cruz (20)	Arthur dela Cruz (9)	Buenafe, Pinto (4)	Smart Araneta Coliseum	0–1

2016–17 schedule

== Commissioner's Cup ==
=== Eliminations ===
==== Standings ====
Pos	Team	W	L	PCT	GB	Qualification
1	Barangay Ginebra San Miguel	9	2	.818 (Note: Head-to-head quotient: Barangay Ginebra 1.117, San Miguel 0.990, Star 0.903)	—	Twice-to-beat in the quarterfinals
2	San Miguel Beermen	9	2	.818	—	Twice-to-beat in the quarterfinals
3	Star Hotshots	9	2	.818	—	Best-of-three quarterfinals
4	TNT KaTropa	8	3	.727	1	Best-of-three quarterfinals
5	Meralco Bolts	7	4	.636	2	Best-of-three quarterfinals
6	Rain or Shine Elasto Painters	5	6	.455	4	Best-of-three quarterfinals
7	Phoenix Fuel Masters	4	7	.364 (Note: Head-to-head quotient: Phoenix 1.127, Alaska 1.116, GlobalPort 0.791; eighth seed playoff: GlobalPort 107–106 Alaska)	5	Twice-to-win in the quarterfinals
8	GlobalPort Batang Pier	4	7	.364	5	Twice-to-win in the quarterfinals
9	Alaska Aces	4	7	.364	5	
10	Mahindra Floodbuster	3	8	.273	6	
11	Blackwater Elite	2	9	.182 (Note: Head-to-head record: Blackwater 1–0 NLEX)	7	
12	NLEX Road Warriors	2	9	.182	7	

Source: PBA.ph

==== Game log ====
2017 PBA Commissioner's Cup game log
Total: 2–9
March: 0–4

Game	Date	Opponent	Score	High points	High rebounds	High assists	Location Attendance	Record
1	March 18	Phoenix	L 116–118 (2OT)	Greg Smith (37)	Greg Smith (30)	Roi Sumang (6)	Cuneta Astrodome	0–1
2	March 22	Alaska	L 95–109	Reil Cervantes (21)	Greg Smith (16)	Greg Smith (6)	Smart Araneta Coliseum	0–2
3	March 26	Rain or Shine	L 88–95	Greg Smith (34)	Greg Smith (20)	Roi Sumang (5)	Ynares Center	0–3
4	March 31	TNT	L 89–92	Greg Smith (22)	Greg Smith (31)	Smith, Sumang (3)	Smart Araneta Coliseum	0–4

April : 1–2

Game	Date	Opponent	Score	High points	High rebounds	High assists	Location Attendance	Record
5	April 8	GlobalPort	W 118–113	Greg Smith (40)	Greg Smith (19)	Pinto, Smith (4)	Mall of Asia Arena	1–4
6	April 16	Meralco	L 91–102	Greg Smith (19)	Greg Smith (14)	Pinto, Smith (7)	Smart Araneta Coliseum	1–5
7	April 22	Star	L 90–96	KG Canaleta (27)	Greg Smith (29)	John Pinto (7)	Mall of Asia Arena	1–6
All-Star Break

May : 1–3

Game	Date	Opponent	Score	High points	High rebounds	High assists	Location Attendance	Record
8	May 3	NLEX	W 104–98	Canaleta, Smith (24)	Greg Smith (18)	Greg Smith (7)	Smart Araneta Coliseum	2–6
9	May 7	Mahindra	L 87–96	Greg Smith (29)	Greg Smith (25)	Greg Smith (6)	Smart Araneta Coliseum	2–7
10	May 26	Barangay Ginebra	L 82–96	Greg Smith (35)	Greg Smith (14)	Cruz, Smith (6)	Alonte Sports Arena	2–8
11	May 31	San Miguel	L 113–124	Greg Smith (21)	Greg Smith (22)	Mark Cruz (6)	Cuneta Astrodome	2–9

2016–17 schedule

== Governors' Cup ==
=== Eliminations ===
==== Standings ====
Pos	Team	W	L	PCT	GB	Qualification
1	Meralco Bolts	9	2	.818	—	Twice-to-beat in the quarterfinals
2	TNT KaTropa	8	3	.727 (Note: Head-to-head record: Talk 'N Text 1–0 Barangay Ginebra)	1	Twice-to-beat in the quarterfinals
3	Barangay Ginebra San Miguel	8	3	.727	1	Twice-to-beat in the quarterfinals
4	Star Hotshots	7	4	.636 (Note: Head to-head quotient: Star 1.04, NLEX 1.01, San Miguel 0.99, Rain or Shine 0.96)	2	Twice-to-beat in the quarterfinals
5	NLEX Road Warriors	7	4	.636	2	Twice-to-win in the quarterfinals
6	San Miguel Beermen	7	4	.636	2	Twice-to-win in the quarterfinals
7	Rain or Shine Elasto Painters	7	4	.636	2	Twice-to-win in the quarterfinals
8	Blackwater Elite	5	6	.455	4	Twice-to-win in the quarterfinals
9	Alaska Aces	3	8	.273 (Note: Head-to-head record: Alaska 1–0 GlobalPort)	6	
10	GlobalPort Batang Pier	3	8	.273	6	
11	Phoenix Fuel Masters	2	9	.182	7	
12	Kia Picanto	0	11	.000	9	

Source: PBA.ph

==== Game log ====
2017 PBA Governors' Cup game log
Total: 5–6
July: 0–3

Game	Date	Opponent	Score	High points	High rebounds	High assists	Location Attendance	Record
1	July 19	Meralco	L 78–107	Trevis Simpson (25)	Trevis Simpson (8)	John Pinto (3)	Smart Araneta Coliseum	0–1
2	July 23	Star	L 86–103	Trevis Simpson (24)	John Paul Erram (15)	Trevis Simpson (2)	Smart Araneta Coliseum	0–2
3	July 29	San Miguel	L 93–118	Michael DiGregorio (18)	John Paul Erram (15)	Gamalinda, Sumang (4)	Ynares Center	0–3

August : 3–1

Game	Date	Opponent	Score	High points	High rebounds	High assists	Location Attendance	Record
4	August 6	Phoenix	W 92–86	Henry Walker (32)	Henry Walker (15)	Henry Walker (5)	Smart Araneta Coliseum	1–3
5	August 18	NLEX	W 107–106	Roi Sumang (32)	Henry Walker (15)	Henry Walker (6)	Smart Araneta Coliseum	2–3
6	August 23	Alaska	W 111–106 (2OT)	Henry Walker (35)	Henry Walker (32)	Cruz, Sumang (5)	Smart Araneta Coliseum	3–3
7	August 30	TNT	L 96–117	Henry Walker (33)	Henry Walker (18)	John Pinto (5)	Mall of Asia Arena	3–4

September: 2–2

Game	Date	Opponent	Score	High points	High rebounds	High assists	Location Attendance	Record
8	September 1	Kia	W 118–97	Henry Walker (25)	John Paul Erram (14)	Henry Walker (7)	Ynares Center	4–4
9	September 8	Barangay Ginebra	L 81–98	Henry Walker (26)	Henry Walker (17)	Roi Sumang (5)	Mall of Asia Arena	4–5
10	September 17	GlobalPort	W 118–107	Allein Maliksi (22)	Henry Walker (13)	Henry Walker (9)	Ynares Center	5–5
11	September 23	Rain or Shine	L 98–122	Allein Maliksi (29)	Henry Walker (13)	Henry Walker (5)	Smart Araneta Coliseum	5–6

2016–17 schedule

=== Playoffs ===
==== Bracket ====
Quarterfinals (Top 4 twice-to-beat)
1	Meralco	91	104
8	Blackwater	92	96
4	Star	89
5	NLEX	77
2	TNT	102	118
7	Rain or Shine	106	114
3	Barangay Ginebra	104
6	San Miguel	84

Semifinals (Best-of-5)
1	Meralco	3
4	Star	0
2	TNT	1
3	Barangay Ginebra	3

Finals (Best-of-7)
1	Meralco	3
3	Barangay Ginebra	4

==== Game log ====
2017 PBA Governors' Cup playoffs game log
Total: 1–1
Quarterfinals: 1–1

Game	Date	Opponent	Score	High points	High rebounds	High assists	Location Attendance	Record
1	September 26	Meralco	W 92–91	Henry Walker (30)	Henry Walker (18)	Henry Walker (6)	Mall of Asia Arena	1–0
2	September 28	Meralco	L 96–104	Henry Walker (34)	Henry Walker (16)	Roi Sumang (8)	Smart Araneta Coliseum	1–1

2016–17 schedule

== Transactions ==
=== Free agency ===
==== Addition ====
Player	Number	Position	Date Signed	Notes
Michael DiGregorio	1	Guard	February 20, 2017	
Mark Cruz	30	Point guard	March 29, 2017	

=== Trades ===
==== Off-season ====
November
October 26, 2016	To Blackwater James Forrester; 2016 2nd round pick	To NLEX Carlo Lastimosa
November 15, 2016	To Blackwater Dylan Ababou	To TNT Frank Golla

==== Commissioner's Cup ====
March
March 28, 2017	To Blackwater 2017 Second Round pick (from NLEX)	To Meralco 2018 Second Round pick (from Blackwater)	To NLEX Rabeh Al-Hussaini (from Meralco)

March 29, 2017	To Blackwater Niño Canaleta	To Globalport Dylan Ababou; James Forrester

==== Governors' Cup ====
November
September 10, 2017	To Blackwater Allein MaliksiChris Javier	To Star Bambam GamalindaKyle Pascual

=== Recruited imports ===
Conference	Name	Country	Number	Debuted	Last game	Record
Commissioner's Cup	Greg Smith	(United States)	4	March 18 (vs. Phoenix)	May 31 (vs. San Miguel)	2–9
Governors' Cup	Trevis Simpson	(United States)	24	July 21 (vs. Meralco)	July 29 (vs. San Miguel)	0–3
Governors' Cup	Henry Walker	(United States)	5	August 6 (vs. Phoenix)	September 28 (vs. Meralco)	6–4

== Awards ==
Recipient	Award	Date awarded	Ref.
Mac Belo	Philippine Cup Player of the Week	November 28, 2016	
Roi Sumang	Philippine Cup Player of the Week	January 16, 2017	
