= Brandon Brown (basketball, born 1985) =

American basketball player

Personal information
- Born: January 14, 1985 (age 41) New Orleans, Louisiana, U.S.
- Listed height: 6 ft 6 in (1.98 m)
- Listed weight: 242 lb (110 kg)

Career information
- High school: Sarah T. Reed (New Orleans, Louisiana)
- College: Mountain View (2006–2007); Holmes CC (2007–2008); CSUSB (2008–2009)
- Playing career: 2009–2022
- Position: Power forward / center

Career history
- 2009–2010: Šiauliai
- 2010: Sūduva
- 2010: Kotwica Kołobrzeg
- 2010: Vitória de Guimarães
- 2010: Saint-Vallier
- 2011: Fjölnir
- 2011: Halcones de Xalapa
- 2011–2012: Club Trouville
- 2012: Lanús
- 2012: Mavort Quito
- 2012–2013: Apollon Limassol
- 2013: SLUC Nancy
- 2013–2014: ASC Denain-Voltaire
- 2014–2015: Anwil Włocławek
- 2015–2016: Hapoel Gilboa Galil
- 2016: Aries Trikala
- 2016: Al-Ahli Jeddah
- 2016–2017: Istanbulspor Beylikduzu
- 2017: Phoenix Fuel Masters
- 2017–2018: Incheon ET Land Elephants
- 2018–2019: Jeonju KCC Egis
- 2019: Chongqing Huaxi International
- 2019–2020: Anyang KGC
- 2020: Al-Ahli
- 2020–2021: Suwon KT Sonicboom
- 2021: San Miguel Beermen
- 2022: Seoul SK Knights

Career highlights
- 2× Korean Basketball League Defensive Player of the Year (2018, 2019); All-Cypriot League Third Team (2013); Cypriot League All-Star (2013); CIBACOPA Champion (2011); CIBACOPA First Team (2011); CCAA tournament MVP (2009); CCAA tournament First Team (2009)

Brandon Phillip Brown (born January 14, 1985) is an American former basketball player. He played college basketball for Mountain View, Holmes CC and Cal State San Bernardino. Following his college career, he played professionally in Europe, South America and Asia.

== College career ==
Brown played college basketball at Mountain View, Holmes Community College and at Cal State San Bernardino, from 2006 to 2009.

== Professional career ==
He started his professional career with Šiauliai of the Lithuanian League. The same year he also played for Sūduva and Kotwica Kołobrzeg.

During the next 5 years, Brown has played in multiple teams such as Vitória de Guimarães, Fjölnir, Lanús, Apollon Limassol, SLUC Nancy, ASC Denain-Voltaire and Anwil Włocławek.

He started the 2015–16 season with Hapoel Gilboa Galil. On January 10, he signed with Aries Trikala of the Greek League. On April 24, he signed with Al-Ahli Jeddah of the Saudi Premier League.

On September 2, 2016, Brown joined Istanbulspor Beylikduzu of the TBL.

On October 28, 2017, Brown joined Incheon ET Land Elephants of the Korean Basketball League.

In May 2020, Brown Joined Al Ahli Bahrain in the Bahraini Basketball league, leading the team along with Dominic Sutton to win the first double in 22 years, winning the league and the domestic cup competition.

In November 2021, Brown signed with the San Miguel Beermen of the Philippine Basketball Association.
