= RJ Jazul =

Filipino basketball player

Ateneo Blue Eagles
- Title: Assistant coach
- League: UAAP

Personal information
- Born: April 11, 1986 (age 40) Pasay, Philippines
- Listed height: 5 ft 11 in (1.80 m)
- Listed weight: 170 lb (77 kg)

Career information
- High school: Letran (Manila)
- College: Letran
- PBA draft: 2010: 2nd round, 15th overall pick
- Drafted by: Alaska Aces
- Playing career: 2010–2025
- Position: Point guard / shooting guard
- Coaching career: 2026–present

Career history

Playing
- 2010–2011: Rain or Shine Elasto Painters
- 2011–2012: Shopinas.com Clickers / Air21 Express
- 2012–2017: Alaska Aces
- 2017–2025: Phoenix Pulse Fuel Masters / Phoenix Super LPG Fuel Masters / Phoenix Fuel Masters

Coaching
- 2026–present: Ateneo (assistant)

Career highlights
- PBA champion (2013 Commissioner's); PBA Mr. Quality Minutes (2020); NCAA Philippines champion (2005)

Rafael Joey Q. Jazul Jr. (born April 11, 1986) is a Filipino professional basketball player who last played for the Phoenix Fuel Masters of the Philippine Basketball Association (PBA). He was drafted 11th overall in the 2010 PBA draft by the Aces. He was then immediately sent to the Elasto Painters in exchange for Rain or Shine's 2nd-round pick in the 2011 PBA Draft. He is also a member of the Letran Knights team who won the NCAA title in 2005

He was awarded the Mr. Quality Minutes award for the 2020 PBA season.

== PBA career statistics ==
Legend
GP	Games played	MPG	Minutes per game	FG%	Field-goal percentage
3FG%	3-point field-goal percentage	4P%	4-point field-goal percentage	FT%	Free-throw percentage
RPG	Rebounds per game	APG	Assists per game	SPG	Steals per game
BPG	Blocks per game	PPG	Points per game	127	Career high

As of the end of 2025–26 season

=== Season-by-season averages ===
Year	Team	GP	MPG	FG%	3P%	4P%	FT%	RPG	APG	SPG	BPG	PPG
2010–11	Rain or Shine	35	13.3	.292	.312	—	.692	1.3	1.1	.3	.0	3.6
2011–12	Shopinas.com / Air21	32	23.4	.368	.373	—	.742	2.8	2.5	.6	—	8.2
2012–13	Alaska	54	18.1	.333	.347	—	.722	2.0	1.7	.5	—	5.6
2013–14	Alaska	44	19.4	.325	.272	—	.778	2.3	1.7	.6	.0	6.8
2014–15	Alaska	58	19.5	.356	.354	—	.797	2.6	1.4	.2	—	6.2
2015–16	Alaska	60	24.9	.366	.381	—	.821	2.7	2.7	.9	.0	10.0
2016–17	Alaska	36	29.6	.328	.312	—	.846	3.4	3.6	1.1	.0	9.6
2016–17	Phoenix	36	29.6	.328	.312	—	.846	3.4	3.6	1.1	.0	9.6
2017–18	Phoenix	36	24.6	.306	.294	—	.750	2.6	2.5	.9	.0	7.9
2019	Phoenix Pulse	39	25.4	.390	.340	—	.814	3.1	2.7	1.0	—	9.6
2020	Phoenix Super LPG	17	25.4	.360	.339	—	.824	2.3	2.1	.7	—	11.0
2021	Phoenix Super LPG	25	26.4	.341	.337	—	.761	2.9	2.2	.8	—	9.6
2022–23	Phoenix Super LPG	35	24.2	.321	.320	—	.793	2.2	2.4	.7	—	9.2
2023–24	Phoenix Super LPG / Phoenix	28	19.5	.395	.372	—	.803	2.1	1.7	.8	—	9.5
2024–25	Phoenix	33	18.1	.302	.294	.286	.794	1.5	1.7	.6	—	6.4
2025–26	Phoenix	9	7.3	.318	.353	.000	1.000	.6	.4	.1	—	2.3
Career		541	21.8	.344	.334	.267	.790	2.4	2.1	.7	.0	7.8
