= Shawn Taggart =

American basketball player

Personal information
- Born: March 26, 1985 (age 41) Richmond, Virginia, U.S.
- Listed height: 6 ft 9 in (2.06 m)
- Listed weight: 229 lb (104 kg)

Career information
- High school: Mount Zion Christian Academy (Durham, North Carolina)
- College: Iowa State (2005–2007); Memphis (2007–2009)
- NBA draft: 2009: undrafted
- Playing career: 2009–2017
- Position: Power forward / center

Career history
- 2009–2010: Ironi Nahariya
- 2010: Cáceres Ciudad del Baloncesto
- 2010: Henan Jiyuan
- 2010: CB Murcia
- 2011: Shanxi Zhongyu
- 2011–2012: Tenis E.Dagcilik Istanbul
- 2012: Springfield Armor
- 2013: Hapoel Gilboa Galil
- 2013–2016: Al Jaysh
- 2016: GlobalPort Batang Pier
- 2017: Rain or Shine Elasto Painters

Shawn Larell Taggart (born March 26, 1985) is an American former professional basketball player who last played for the Rain or Shine Elasto Painters of the Philippine Basketball Association (PBA).

As a junior power forward/center for the Memphis Tigers, he averaged 10.4 PPG and 7.6 RPG in the 2008–09 season. He was a member of the team as a sophomore when the Tigers went to the NCAA National Championship in 2008, which they lost in overtime to the Kansas Jayhawks.

Taggart signed an agent for the NBA draft, but went undrafted. Taggart competed in the 2009 NBA Summer League with the Toronto Raptors.

On November 6, 2012, Taggart joined the Springfield Armor. On January 7, 2013, he was traded to the Santa Cruz Warriors in exchange for Paul Carter. He was then waived by the Warriors on January 8.

In March 2016, Taggart was signed as the new import for GlobalPort Batang Pier of the Philippine Basketball Association in the 2016 PBA Commissioner's Cup, replacing Calvin Walner.

In March 2017, he was signed by the Rain or Shine Elasto Painters as their import for the 2017 PBA Commissioner's Cup.
