= Arthur dela Cruz =

Filipino basketball player

Arthur Dela Cruz
No. 18 – Ilagan Isabela Cowboys
- Position: Small forward / power forward
- League: MPBL

Personal information
- Born: May 9, 1992 (age 34) San Miguel, Bulacan, Philippines
- Listed height: 6 ft 4 in (1.93 m)
- Listed weight: 210 lb (95 kg)

Career information
- High school: San Beda (Taytay, Rizal)
- College: Ateneo (2010); San Beda (2012–2015)
- PBA draft: 2015: 1st round, 9th overall pick
- Drafted by: Blackwater Elite
- Playing career: 2015–present

Career history
- 2015–2017: Blackwater Elite
- 2017–2020: Barangay Ginebra San Miguel
- 2021–2023: NorthPort Batang Pier
- 2023–2024: Davao Occidental Tigers
- 2025–present: Ilagan Isabela Cowboys

Career highlights
- 2× PBA champion (2019 Governors', 2020 Philippine); PBA All-Rookie Team (2016); 3× MPBL All-Star (2024–2026); 3× NCAA Philippines champion (2012–2014); NCAA Philippines Finals MVP (2013); UAAP champion (2010)

Arthur A. Dela Cruz Jr. (born May 9, 1992) is a Filipino professional basketball player for the Ilagan Isabela Cowboys of the Maharlika Pilipinas Basketball League (MPBL).

== Early life ==
Dela Cruz started playing basketball when he was in 4th grade at St. Mary's Academy in Bulacan. It was his father, Arturo dela Cruz Sr., known as Art Dela Cruz, himself a former PBA player, who first introduced him to the sport. In high school, he played as power forward of the San Beda Red Cubs.

== College career ==
Dela Cruz first attended college at the Ateneo de Manila University for one year. He suited up for the Blue Eagles as a rookie in 2010 and played a key role in their campaign, when the Blue Eagles won the title that year. The following year, he returned to his high school alma mater, San Beda College, served one year of residency before finally seeing action for the Red Lions in 2012. Initially, he was a backup to Jake Pascual, but he took the starting "4" slot when Pascual already played out his college eligibility in 2013. In that same year, the Red Lions won their fourth straight title at the expense of Letran, when he was awarded the Finals MVP. In 2015, he led the Red Lions to the Finals once again, only to lose in three games at the expense of the Letran Knights. In his last collegiate game, he finished with a team-high 15 points on 8-of-12 shooting, 13 boards and was two assists shy of a triple-double, on top of two blocks and one steal in 34 minutes in the deciding Game Three.

== Professional career ==
Dela Cruz was picked ninth overall by the Blackwater Elite of the Philippine Basketball Association in the 2015 PBA draft. On October 30, 2015, he signed the two-year rookie deal with Blackwater.

On August 31, 2017, dela Cruz, along with Raymond Aguilar, was traded to the Barangay Ginebra San Miguel for Chris Ellis and Dave Marcelo.

On November 9, 2021, he was traded to the NorthPort Batang Pier for Sidney Onwubere. He became an unrestricted free agent after the 2022–23 PBA season.

== PBA career statistics ==
Legend
GP	Games played	MPG	Minutes per game
FG%	Field-goal percentage	3P%	3-point field-goal percentage	FT%	Free-throw percentage
RPG	Rebounds per game	APG	Assists per game	SPG	Steals per game
BPG	Blocks per game	PPG	Points per game	**Bold**	Career high

As of the end of 2022–23 season

=== Season-by-season averages ===
Year	Team	GP	MPG	FG%	3P%	FT%	RPG	APG	SPG	BPG	PPG
2015–16	Blackwater	**32**	26.2	**.506**	.220	.662	4.7	2.2	**1.7**	**.2**	11.8
2016–17	Blackwater	12	**31.1**	.497	.000	.682	**7.2**	**2.8**	1.3	.1	**14.3**
2017–18	Barangay Ginebra	2	9.9	.286	.000	.500	3.0	2.0	1.0	.0	2.5
2019	Barangay Ginebra	**32**	17.4	.500	**.235**	.719	3.0	1.4	.8	.1	6.3
2020	Barangay Ginebra	5	10.7	.286	.000	.600	2.0	.2	.2	.0	2.2
2022–23	NorthPort	19	9.0	.479	.000	**.857**	1.4	.6	.4	.0	3.1
Career		102	19.7	.494	.208	.691	3.7	1.6	1.0	.1	8.1

== Personal life ==
Dela Cruz is the son of former PBA player and former Terrafirma Dyip assistant coach Arturo dela Cruz. He took up AB in Communications in San Beda College and his long-term plan is to help his mother with their family business in Bulacan.

Preceded by Baser Amer	NCAA Men's Basketball Finals Most Valuable Player; 2013	Succeeded by Anthony Semerad
