= 2014–15 San Miguel Beermen season =

- Head coach: Leo Austria
- General manager: Gee Abanilla
- Owners: San Miguel Brewery, Inc. (a San Miguel Corporation subsidiary)

Philippine Cup results
- Record: 9–2 (81.8%)
- Place: 1st
- Playoff finish: Champions (Defeated Alaska, 4–3)

Commissioner's Cup results
- Record: 4–7 (36.4%)
- Place: 9th
- Playoff finish: eliminated

Governors' Cup results
- Record: 8–3 (72.7%)
- Place: 2nd
- Playoff finish: Champions (Defeated Alaska, 4-0)

San Miguel Beermen seasons

The 2014–15 San Miguel Beermen season was the 40th season of the franchise in the Philippine Basketball Association (PBA).

== Key dates ==
- August 2: Leo Austria was named as the head coach of the San Miguel Beermen. Coach Biboy Ravanes was demoted to assistant coach and active consultant Todd Purves will have a minimal role with the team.
- August 24: The 2014 PBA Draft took place in Midtown Atrium, Robinson Place Manila.

== Draft picks ==
Round	Pick	Player	Position	Nationality	PBA D-League team	College
1	3	Ronald Pascual	SF	Philippines	NLEX (D-League)	SSC

== Rosters ==
2014–15 San Miguel Beermen roster
Players
Coaches

Pos.	#	POB	Name	Height	Weight	DOB (YYYY–MM–DD)	From
G/F	3	(United States)	Chris Lutz	6 ft 3 in (1.91 m)	200 lb (91 kg)	1985-02-11	Marshall
F/C	4	(Philippines)	Jay-R Reyes	6 ft 7 in (2.01 m)	215 lb (98 kg)	1984-07-16	Philippines
G	5	(Philippines)	Alex Cabagnot	6 ft 0 in (1.83 m)	180 lb (82 kg)	1982-12-08	Hawaiʻi–Hilo
G	6	(United States)	Chris Ross	6 ft 1 in (1.85 m)	180 lb (82 kg)	1985-03-08	Marshall
G	11	(Philippines)	Jeric Fortuna	5 ft 8 in (1.73 m)	180 lb (82 kg)	1991-11-25	UST
G/F	13	(United States)	Marcio Lassiter	6 ft 3 in (1.91 m)	185 lb (84 kg)	1987-05-16	Cal State Fullerton
C	15	(Philippines)	June Mar Fajardo	6 ft 11 in (2.11 m)	268 lb (122 kg)	1989-11-17	Cebu
F	21	(Philippines)	Nelbert Omolon	6 ft 4 in (1.93 m)	185 lb (84 kg)	1980-06-30	Philippine Christian
F	23	(Philippines)	Ronald Pascual	6 ft 3 in (1.91 m)	190 lb (86 kg)	1988-06-23	San Sebastian
F	27	(Philippines)	Gabby Espinas	6 ft 4 in (1.93 m)	200 lb (91 kg)	1982-01-03	Philippine Christian
F	29	(Philippines)	Arwind Santos (C)	6 ft 4 in (1.93 m)	175 lb (79 kg)	1981-06-10	Far Eastern
F	33	(Australia)	David Semerad	6 ft 5 in (1.96 m)	220 lb (100 kg)	1991-04-25	San Beda
G/F	71	(Philippines)	Ronald Tubid	6 ft 1 in (1.85 m)	185 lb (84 kg)	1981-10-15	UE
C	95	(Philippines)	Yancy De Ocampo	6 ft 9 in (2.06 m)	225 lb (102 kg)	1980-03-11	Saint Francis of Assisi

Head coach

- (Philippines) Leo Austria (Lyceum)

Assistant coach(es)

- (Philippines) Peter Martin (San Sebastian)
- (Philippines) Biboy Ravanes (Cebu)
- (Philippines) Boyzie Zamar (UE)
- (Philippines) Dayong Mendoza
- (Philippines) Ato Agustin (Lyceum)
- (Philippines) Jorge Gallent (Far Eastern)
- (Philippines) Siot Tanquingcen (UST)

Team manager

- (Philippines) Gee Abanilla (De La Salle)

Legend

- (C) Team captain
- (CI) Commissioner's Cup Import
- (GI) Governors' Cup Import
- (EI) EASL Import
- (DP) Unsigned draft pick
- (FA) Free agent
- (IN) Inactive
- (S) Suspended
- (R) Rookie
- Injured

Roster

== Philippine Cup ==
=== Eliminations ===
==== Standings ====
Pos	Team	W	L	PCT	GB	Qualification
1	San Miguel Beermen	9	2	.818 (Note: Head-to-head record: San Miguel 1–0 Rain or Shine)	—	Advance to semifinals
2	Rain or Shine Elasto Painters	9	2	.818	—	Advance to semifinals
3	Alaska Aces	8	3	.727 (Note: Head-to-head record: Alaska 1–0 Talk 'N Text)	1	Twice-to-beat in the quarterfinals
4	Talk 'N Text Tropang Texters	8	3	.727	1	Twice-to-beat in the quarterfinals
5	Barangay Ginebra San Miguel	6	5	.545 (Note: Head-to-head quotient: Barangay Ginebra 1.07, Meralco 1.06, Purefoods Star 0.89)	3	Twice-to-beat in the quarterfinals
6	Meralco Bolts	6	5	.545	3	Twice-to-beat in the quarterfinals
7	Purefoods Star Hotshots	6	5	.545	3	Twice-to-win in the quarterfinals
8	GlobalPort Batang Pier	5	6	.455	4	Twice-to-win in the quarterfinals
9	Barako Bull Energy	4	7	.364 (Note: Head-to-head record: Barako Bull 1–0 NLEX)	5	Twice-to-win in the quarterfinals
10	NLEX Road Warriors	4	7	.364	5	Twice-to-win in the quarterfinals
11	Kia Sorento	1	10	.091	8	
12	Blackwater Elite	0	11	.000	9	

Source: PBA.ph

=== Playoffs ===
==== Bracket ====
Quarterfinals (1st phase) (Higher seeds twice-to-beat)
3	Alaska	82
10	NLEX	78
6	Meralco	77
7	Purefoods Star	65
4	Talk 'N Text	105
9	Barako Bull	76
5	Barangay Ginebra	95
8	GlobalPort	78

Quarterfinals (2nd phase) (Single elimination)
3	Alaska	87
6	Meralco	69
4	Talk N Text	83
5	Barangay Ginebra	67

Semifinals (Best-of-7)
2	Rain or Shine	2
3	Alaska	4
1	San Miguel	4
4	Talk N' Text	0

Finals (Best-of-7)
3	Alaska	3
1	San Miguel	4

== Commissioner's Cup ==
=== Eliminations ===
==== Standings ====
Pos	Team	W	L	PCT	GB	Qualification
1	Rain or Shine Elasto Painters	8	3	.727 (Note: Head-to-head quotient: Rain or Shine 1.025, Talk 'N Text 1.010, Purefoods 0.969)	—	Twice-to-beat in the quarterfinals
2	Talk 'N Text Tropang Texters	8	3	.727	—	Twice-to-beat in the quarterfinals
3	Purefoods Star Hotshots	8	3	.727	—	Best-of-three quarterfinals
4	NLEX Road Warriors	6	5	.545 (Note: Head-to-head record: NLEX 1–0 Meralco)	2	Best-of-three quarterfinals
5	Meralco Bolts	6	5	.545	2	Best-of-three quarterfinals
6	Alaska Aces	5	6	.455 (Note: Head-to-head quotient: Alaska 1.021, Barako Bull 1.019, Barangay Ginebra 0.960)	3	Best-of-three quarterfinals
7	Barako Bull Energy	5	6	.455	3	Twice-to-win in the quarterfinals
8	Barangay Ginebra San Miguel	5	6	.455	3	Twice-to-win in the quarterfinals
9	San Miguel Beermen	4	7	.364 (Note: Head-to-head quotient: San Miguel 1.011, GlobalPort 0.995, Kia 0.994)	4	
10	GlobalPort Batang Pier	4	7	.364	4	
11	Kia Carnival	4	7	.364	4	
12	Blackwater Elite	3	8	.273	5	

Source: PBA.ph

=== Playoffs ===
==== Bracket ====
Quarterfinals
(#1 twice-to-beat)
1	Rain or Shine	92
8	Barangay Ginebra	91
(Best-of-3)
4	NLEX	0
5	Meralco	2
(#2 twice-to-beat)
2	Talk 'N Text	127
7	Barako Bull	97
(Best-of-3)
3	Purefoods Star	2
6	Alaska	0

Semifinals (Best-of-5)
1	Rain or Shine	3
5	Meralco	0
2	Talk 'N Text	3
3	Purefoods Star	1

Finals (Best-of-7)
1	Rain or Shine	3
2	Talk 'N Text	4

== Governors' Cup ==
=== Eliminations ===
==== Standings ====
Pos	Team	W	L	PCT	GB	Qualification
1	Alaska Aces	8	3	.727 (Note: Head-to-head record: Alaska 1–0 San Miguel)	—	Twice-to-beat in the quarterfinals
2	San Miguel Beermen	8	3	.727	—	Twice-to-beat in the quarterfinals
3	Rain or Shine Elasto Painters	7	4	.636 (Note: Head-to-head record: Rain or Shine 1–0 GlobalPort)	1	Twice-to-beat in the quarterfinals
4	GlobalPort Batang Pier	7	4	.636	1	Twice-to-beat in the quarterfinals
5	Star Hotshots	6	5	.545 (Note: Head-to-head record: Barako Bull 1–0 Star)	2	Twice-to-win in the quarterfinals
6	Barako Bull Energy	6	5	.545	2	Twice-to-win in the quarterfinals
7	Meralco Bolts	5	6	.455 (Note: Head-to-head quotient: Meralco 1.13, Barangay Ginebra 1.00, Kia 0.95, Talk 'N Text 0.93)	3	Twice-to-win in the quarterfinals
8	Barangay Ginebra San Miguel	5	6	.455	3	Twice-to-win in the quarterfinals
9	Kia Carnival	5	6	.455	3	
10	Talk 'N Text Tropang Texters	5	6	.455	3	
11	NLEX Road Warriors	3	8	.273	5	
12	Blackwater Elite	1	10	.091	7	

Source: PBA.ph

=== Playoffs ===
==== Bracket ====
Quarterfinals (Top 4 twice-to-beat)
1	Alaska	114
8	Ginebra	108
4	GlobalPort	73	94
5	Star	126	101
2	San Miguel	99	102
7	Meralco	106	86
3	Rain or Shine	134**
6	Barako Bull	132

Semifinals (Best-of-5)
1	Alaska	3
5	Star	0
2	San Miguel	3
3	Rain or Shine	1

Finals (Best-of-7)
1	Alaska	0
2	San Miguel	4

*Game went into double overtime

== Transactions ==
=== Trades ===
==== Pre-season ====
July 25, 2014	To NLEX 2015 1st-round pick	To San Miguel 2016 1st-round pick

==== Draft day ====
August 24, 2014	To San Miguel Ronald Pascual (first-round pick, from Barako); 2016 first-round pick (from Barako)	To Barako Bull Jojo Duncil; Chico Lanete; Gab Banal (second-round pick, from San Miguel)

==== Philippine Cup ====
November 11, 2014	To San Miguel Jeric Fortuna	To Barako Bull Paolo Hubalde
December 10, 2014	To San Miguel Alex Cabagnot	To GlobalPort Sol Mercado; 2018 and 2019 second-round picks

==== Commissioner's Cup ====
February 3, 2015	To San Miguel JR Reyes (from Barangay Ginebra)	To Barako Bull Justin Chua (from San Miguel); 2017 1st-round pick (from San Miguel)	To Barangay Ginebra Dorian Peña (from Barako Bull); 2015 2nd-round pick (from Barako Bull)

April 6, 2015	To San Miguel Billy Mamaril (from Ginebra)	To Barako Bull Energy Rico Maierhofer
April 6, 2015	To San Miguel Yancy de Ocampo; Gabby Espinas	To GlobalPort Billy Mamaril; Doug Kramer

=== Recruited imports ===
Tournament	Name	Debuted	Last game	Record
Commissioner's Cup	Ronald Roberts	February 4 (vs Kia)	February 17 (vs Alaska)	0–4
Commissioner's Cup	Arizona Reid	February 21 (vs Meralco)	March 24 (vs GlobalPort)	4–3
Governors' Cup	Arizona Reid	May 6 (vs Kia)	July 17 (vs Alaska)	16–5
