= 2014–15 Talk 'N Text Tropang Texters season =

- Head coach: Jong Uichico
- General manager: Jimmy Alapag; Magnum Membrere (assistant)
- Owners: Smart Communications (an MVP Group subsidiary)

Philippine Cup results
- Record: 8–3 (72.7%)
- Place: 4th
- Playoff finish: Semifinalist (lost to San Miguel, 0–4)

Commissioner's Cup results
- Record: 8–3 (72.7%)
- Place: 2nd
- Playoff finish: Champions vs. Rain or Shine 4-3

Governors' Cup results
- Record: 5–6 (45.5%)
- Place: 10th
- Playoff finish: Did not qualify

Talk 'N Text Tropang Texters seasons

The 2014–15 Talk 'N Text Tropang Texters season was the 25th season of the franchise in the Philippine Basketball Association (PBA).

== Key dates ==
- July 9: Talk 'N Text Tropang Texters head coach Norman Black was moved to the Meralco Bolts, replacing Ryan Gregorio as head coach. Replacing Black in Talk 'N Text is assistant coach Jong Uichico.
- August 24: The 2014 PBA draft took place in Midtown Atrium, Robinson Place Manila.
- January 9, 2015: Jimmy Alapag formally announced his retirement during a press conference at the Smart Araneta Coliseum prior to the second game of the 2014–15 PBA Philippine Cup Finals between the Alaska Aces and the San Miguel Beermen.
- March 5: The team retired the jersey number of Jimmy Alapag during the All-Star Weekend, where he was also added as the 13th man of the South All-Stars.

== Draft picks ==
Round	Pick	Player	Position	Nationality	PBA D-League team	College
2	8	Harold Arboleda	F	Philippines	Jumbo Plastic Linoleum Giants	Perpetual

== Roster ==
2014–15 Talk 'N Text Tropang Texters roster
Players
Coaches

Pos.	#	POB	Name	Height	Weight	DOB (YYYY–MM–DD)	From
F	2	(Philippines)	Jay Washington	6 ft 7 in (2.01 m)	250 lb (113 kg)	1981-11-10	Eckerd
F	4	(United States)	Harvey Carey	6 ft 3 in (1.91 m)	240 lb (109 kg)	1979-03-18	Sonoma State
G	6	(Philippines)	Kevin Alas (injured) (R/IN)	6 ft 0 in (1.83 m)	175 lb (79 kg)	1991-11-13	Letran
G	9	(Philippines)	Robert Labagala	5 ft 7 in (1.70 m)	170 lb (77 kg)	1984-07-05	UE
G	10	(United States)	Ryan Jay Reyes	6 ft 2 in (1.88 m)	190 lb (86 kg)	1983-08-10	Cal State Fullerton
G	11	(Philippines)	Willie Miller	5 ft 11 in (1.80 m)	200 lb (91 kg)	1977-07-13	Letran
G/F	12	(Philippines)	Larry Fonacier	6 ft 2 in (1.88 m)	170 lb (77 kg)	1982-05-13	Ateneo
G	17	(Philippines)	Jayson Castro	5 ft 10 in (1.78 m)	185 lb (84 kg)	1986-06-30	Philippine Christian
F	21	(United States)	Kelly Williams	6 ft 6 in (1.98 m)	225 lb (102 kg)	1982-02-07	Oakland
G/F	22	(Philippines)	Matt Ganuelas-Rosser (R)	6 ft 4 in (1.93 m)	186 lb (84 kg)	1990-06-13	Cal Poly Pomona
F	23	(Philippines)	Elmer Espiritu (IN)	6 ft 4 in (1.93 m)	185 lb (84 kg)	1985-11-23	UE
F/C	24	(United States)	Robert Reyes	6 ft 6 in (1.98 m)	215 lb (98 kg)	1983-03-16	Flagler
F	33	(Philippines)	Ranidel De Ocampo (C)	6 ft 6 in (1.98 m)	225 lb (102 kg)	1981-12-08	Saint Francis of Assisi
F	42	(United States)	Danny Seigle	6 ft 8 in (2.03 m)	205 lb (93 kg)	1976-06-14	Wagner
F	51	(Philippines)	Aaron Aban	6 ft 3 in (1.91 m)	200 lb (91 kg)	1982-04-08	Letran

Head coach

- (Philippines) Jong Uichico (De La Salle)

Assistant coach(es)

- (Philippines) Nash Racela (De La Salle)
- (Philippines) Bong Ravena (UE)
- (Philippines) Jamike Jarin
- (Philippines) Josh Reyes (Far Eastern)

Team manager

- (United States) Jimmy Alapag (Cal State San Bernardino)
- (Philippines) Magnum Membrere (Ateneo) (Asst. Mgr.)

Legend

- (C) Team captain
- (CI) Commissioner's Cup Import
- (GI) Governors' Cup Import
- (EI) EASL Import
- (DP) Unsigned draft pick
- (FA) Free agent
- (IN) Inactive
- (S) Suspended
- (R) Rookie
- Injured

Roster

== Philippine Cup ==
=== Eliminations ===
==== Standings ====
Pos	Team	W	L	PCT	GB	Qualification
1	San Miguel Beermen	9	2	.818 (Note: Head-to-head record: San Miguel 1–0 Rain or Shine)	—	Advance to semifinals
2	Rain or Shine Elasto Painters	9	2	.818	—	Advance to semifinals
3	Alaska Aces	8	3	.727 (Note: Head-to-head record: Alaska 1–0 Talk 'N Text)	1	Twice-to-beat in the quarterfinals
4	Talk 'N Text Tropang Texters	8	3	.727	1	Twice-to-beat in the quarterfinals
5	Barangay Ginebra San Miguel	6	5	.545 (Note: Head-to-head quotient: Barangay Ginebra 1.07, Meralco 1.06, Purefoods Star 0.89)	3	Twice-to-beat in the quarterfinals
6	Meralco Bolts	6	5	.545	3	Twice-to-beat in the quarterfinals
7	Purefoods Star Hotshots	6	5	.545	3	Twice-to-win in the quarterfinals
8	GlobalPort Batang Pier	5	6	.455	4	Twice-to-win in the quarterfinals
9	Barako Bull Energy	4	7	.364 (Note: Head-to-head record: Barako Bull 1–0 NLEX)	5	Twice-to-win in the quarterfinals
10	NLEX Road Warriors	4	7	.364	5	Twice-to-win in the quarterfinals
11	Kia Sorento	1	10	.091	8	
12	Blackwater Elite	0	11	.000	9	

Source: PBA.ph

=== Playoffs ===
==== Bracket ====
Quarterfinals (1st phase) (Higher seeds twice-to-beat)
3	Alaska	82
10	NLEX	78
6	Meralco	77
7	Purefoods Star	65
4	Talk 'N Text	105
9	Barako Bull	76
5	Barangay Ginebra	95
8	GlobalPort	78

Quarterfinals (2nd phase) (Single elimination)
3	Alaska	87
6	Meralco	69
4	Talk N Text	83
5	Barangay Ginebra	67

Semifinals (Best-of-7)
2	Rain or Shine	2
3	Alaska	4
1	San Miguel	4
4	Talk N' Text	0

Finals (Best-of-7)
3	Alaska	3
1	San Miguel	4

== Commissioner's Cup ==
=== Eliminations ===
==== Standings ====
Pos	Team	W	L	PCT	GB	Qualification
1	Rain or Shine Elasto Painters	8	3	.727 (Note: Head-to-head quotient: Rain or Shine 1.025, Talk 'N Text 1.010, Purefoods 0.969)	—	Twice-to-beat in the quarterfinals
2	Talk 'N Text Tropang Texters	8	3	.727	—	Twice-to-beat in the quarterfinals
3	Purefoods Star Hotshots	8	3	.727	—	Best-of-three quarterfinals
4	NLEX Road Warriors	6	5	.545 (Note: Head-to-head record: NLEX 1–0 Meralco)	2	Best-of-three quarterfinals
5	Meralco Bolts	6	5	.545	2	Best-of-three quarterfinals
6	Alaska Aces	5	6	.455 (Note: Head-to-head quotient: Alaska 1.021, Barako Bull 1.019, Barangay Ginebra 0.960)	3	Best-of-three quarterfinals
7	Barako Bull Energy	5	6	.455	3	Twice-to-win in the quarterfinals
8	Barangay Ginebra San Miguel	5	6	.455	3	Twice-to-win in the quarterfinals
9	San Miguel Beermen	4	7	.364 (Note: Head-to-head quotient: San Miguel 1.011, GlobalPort 0.995, Kia 0.994)	4	
10	GlobalPort Batang Pier	4	7	.364	4	
11	Kia Carnival	4	7	.364	4	
12	Blackwater Elite	3	8	.273	5	

Source: PBA.ph

=== Playoffs ===
==== Bracket ====
Quarterfinals
(#1 twice-to-beat)
1	Rain or Shine	92
8	Barangay Ginebra	91
(Best-of-3)
4	NLEX	0
5	Meralco	2
(#2 twice-to-beat)
2	Talk 'N Text	127
7	Barako Bull	97
(Best-of-3)
3	Purefoods Star	2
6	Alaska	0

Semifinals (Best-of-5)
1	Rain or Shine	3
5	Meralco	0
2	Talk 'N Text	3
3	Purefoods Star	1

Finals (Best-of-7)
1	Rain or Shine	3
2	Talk 'N Text	4

== Governors' Cup ==
=== Eliminations ===
==== Standings ====
Pos	Team	W	L	PCT	GB	Qualification
1	Alaska Aces	8	3	.727 (Note: Head-to-head record: Alaska 1–0 San Miguel)	—	Twice-to-beat in the quarterfinals
2	San Miguel Beermen	8	3	.727	—	Twice-to-beat in the quarterfinals
3	Rain or Shine Elasto Painters	7	4	.636 (Note: Head-to-head record: Rain or Shine 1–0 GlobalPort)	1	Twice-to-beat in the quarterfinals
4	GlobalPort Batang Pier	7	4	.636	1	Twice-to-beat in the quarterfinals
5	Star Hotshots	6	5	.545 (Note: Head-to-head record: Barako Bull 1–0 Star)	2	Twice-to-win in the quarterfinals
6	Barako Bull Energy	6	5	.545	2	Twice-to-win in the quarterfinals
7	Meralco Bolts	5	6	.455 (Note: Head-to-head quotient: Meralco 1.13, Barangay Ginebra 1.00, Kia 0.95, Talk 'N Text 0.93)	3	Twice-to-win in the quarterfinals
8	Barangay Ginebra San Miguel	5	6	.455	3	Twice-to-win in the quarterfinals
9	Kia Carnival	5	6	.455	3	
10	Talk 'N Text Tropang Texters	5	6	.455	3	
11	NLEX Road Warriors	3	8	.273	5	
12	Blackwater Elite	1	10	.091	7	

Source: PBA.ph

==== Bracket ====
Quarterfinals (Top 4 twice-to-beat)
1	Alaska	114
8	Ginebra	108
4	GlobalPort	73	94
5	Star	126	101
2	San Miguel	99	102
7	Meralco	106	86
3	Rain or Shine	134**
6	Barako Bull	132

Semifinals (Best-of-5)
1	Alaska	3
5	Star	0
2	San Miguel	3
3	Rain or Shine	1

Finals (Best-of-7)
1	Alaska	0
2	San Miguel	4

*Game went into double overtime

== Transactions ==
=== Trades ===
==== Pre-season ====
September 22, 2014	To GlobalPort Nonoy Baclao and 2017 1st round pick (from Talk 'n Text)	To NLEX Harold Arboleda and 2018 2nd round pick (from Talk 'n Text via Globalport); 2016 2nd round pick (from Ginebra via GlobalPort)	To Talk 'N Text Jay Washington (from GlobalPort); Matt Ganuelas (from NLEX via GlobalPort)

October 2, 2014	To Rain or Shine 2015 & 2019 2nd round picks	To Talk 'N Text Larry Rodriguez

October 9, 2014	To Blackwater Larry Rodriguez and 2015 1st round pick (from Talk 'N Text)	To NLEX Niño Canaleta (from Talk 'N Text via Blackwater)	To Talk 'N Text Kevin Alas (from NLEX); 2015 1st round pick (from Blackwater)

=== Recruited imports ===
Tournament	Name	Debuted	Last game	Record
Commissioner's Cup	Richard Howell	January 28 (vs Rain or Shine)	February 15 (vs Ginebra)	4–1
Commissioner's Cup	Ivan Johnson	February 20 (vs NLEX)	April 29 (vs Rain or Shine)	12–6
Governors' Cup	Steffphon Pettigrew	May 10 (vs Barangay Ginebra)	June 19 (vs Kia)	5–6
Governors' Cup	(Jordan) Sam Daghles*	May 10 (vs Barangay Ginerba)	June 19 (vs Kia)	5–6

(* Asian import)
