= 2014–15 Alaska Aces season =

- Head coach: Alex Compton
- General manager: Dickie Bachmann
- Owner: Alaska Milk Corporation

Philippine Cup results
- Record: 8–3 (72.7%)
- Place: 3rd
- Playoff finish: Runner-up vs. San Miguel 3–4

Commissioner's Cup results
- Record: 5–6 (45.5%)
- Place: 6th
- Playoff finish: Quarterfinalist (lost to Purefoods Star in two games)

Governors' Cup results
- Record: 8–3 (72.7%)
- Place: 1st
- Playoff finish: Runner-up vs. San Miguel 0–4

Alaska Aces seasons

The 2014–15 Alaska Aces season was the 29th season of the franchise in the Philippine Basketball Association (PBA).

== Key dates ==
=== 2014 ===
- August 24: The 2014 PBA Draft took place in Midtown Atrium, Robinson Place Manila.

== Draft picks ==
Round	Pick	Player	Position	Nationality	PBA D-League team	College
1	5	Chris Banchero	G	United States	Boracay Rum Waves	SPU
2	1	Rome dela Rosa	F	Philippines	NLEX (D-League)	SBC
2	4	Junjun Alas	C	Philippines	Café France Bakers	Letran

== Roster ==
2014–15 Alaska Aces roster
Players
Coaches

Pos.	#	POB	Name	Height	Weight	DOB (YYYY–MM–DD)	From
G	2	(United States)	Chris Banchero (R)	6 ft 0 in (1.83 m)	185 lb (84 kg)	1989-01-24	Seattle Pacific
G/F	3	(Philippines)	Cyrus Baguio	6 ft 2 in (1.88 m)	180 lb (82 kg)	1980-08-19	UST
F	4	(Philippines)	Manuel, Vic	6 ft 5 in (1.96 m)	208 lb (94 kg)	1987-06-18	PSBA
C	7	(Papua New Guinea)	Sonny Thoss	6 ft 7 in (2.01 m)	205 lb (93 kg)	1981-12-07	James Cook
F	8	(Philippines)	Calvin Abueva	6 ft 3 in (1.91 m)	185 lb (84 kg)	1988-02-04	San Sebastian
F/C	9	(Philippines)	Nonoy Baclao	6 ft 6 in (1.98 m)	210 lb (95 kg)	1987-06-15	Ateneo
F	11	(United States)	Rome dela Rosa (R)	6 ft 3 in (1.91 m)	185 lb (84 kg)	1990-12-11	San Beda
G/F	15	(United States)	Josh Vanlandingham (IN)	6 ft 4 in (1.93 m)	205 lb (93 kg)	1984-01-22	Everett CC
G	17	(Philippines)	Ping Exciminiano	6 ft 0 in (1.83 m)	185 lb (84 kg)	1988-11-17	Far Eastern
F/C	21	(Philippines)	Paolo Bugia (IN)	6 ft 6 in (1.98 m)	215 lb (98 kg)	1981-01-19	Ateneo
G/F	25	(Philippines)	Dondon Hontiveros	6 ft 3 in (1.91 m)	180 lb (82 kg)	1977-06-01	Cebu
C	26	(Philippines)	Samigue Eman	6 ft 9 in (2.06 m)	260 lb (118 kg)	1982-03-12	Mindanao
F/C	30	(United States)	Eric Menk	6 ft 6 in (1.98 m)	250 lb (113 kg)	1974-08-24	Lake Superior State
G	31	(Philippines)	RJ Jazul	5 ft 11 in (1.80 m)	170 lb (77 kg)	1986-04-11	Letran
F	35	(United States)	Tony dela Cruz (C)	6 ft 5 in (1.96 m)	209 lb (95 kg)	1978-08-24	UC Irvine
G	42	(Philippines)	JVee Casio	5 ft 10 in (1.78 m)	200 lb (91 kg)	1986-09-01	De La Salle

Head coach

- (Philippines) Alex Compton (Cornell)

Assistant coach(es)

- (Philippines) Louie Alas (Adamson)
- (United States) Jeffrey Cariaso (Sonoma State)
- (Philippines) Topex Robinson (San Sebastian)
- (Philippines) Monch Gavieres (Letran)
- (Philippines) Franco Atienza

Team manager

- (Philippines) Dickie Bachmann^{[a]} (De La Salle)

Legend

- (C) Team captain
- (CI) Commissioner's Cup Import
- (GI) Governors' Cup Import
- (EI) EASL Import
- (DP) Unsigned draft pick
- (FA) Free agent
- (IN) Inactive
- (S) Suspended
- (R) Rookie
- Injured

Roster

- ^{a} also serves as Alaska's board governor.

== Philippine Cup ==
=== Eliminations ===
==== Standings ====
Pos	Team	W	L	PCT	GB	Qualification
1	San Miguel Beermen	9	2	.818 (Note: Head-to-head record: San Miguel 1–0 Rain or Shine)	—	Advance to semifinals
2	Rain or Shine Elasto Painters	9	2	.818	—	Advance to semifinals
3	Alaska Aces	8	3	.727 (Note: Head-to-head record: Alaska 1–0 Talk 'N Text)	1	Twice-to-beat in the quarterfinals
4	Talk 'N Text Tropang Texters	8	3	.727	1	Twice-to-beat in the quarterfinals
5	Barangay Ginebra San Miguel	6	5	.545 (Note: Head-to-head quotient: Barangay Ginebra 1.07, Meralco 1.06, Purefoods Star 0.89)	3	Twice-to-beat in the quarterfinals
6	Meralco Bolts	6	5	.545	3	Twice-to-beat in the quarterfinals
7	Purefoods Star Hotshots	6	5	.545	3	Twice-to-win in the quarterfinals
8	GlobalPort Batang Pier	5	6	.455	4	Twice-to-win in the quarterfinals
9	Barako Bull Energy	4	7	.364 (Note: Head-to-head record: Barako Bull 1–0 NLEX)	5	Twice-to-win in the quarterfinals
10	NLEX Road Warriors	4	7	.364	5	Twice-to-win in the quarterfinals
11	Kia Sorento	1	10	.091	8	
12	Blackwater Elite	0	11	.000	9	

Source: PBA.ph

==== Game log ====
2015 PBA Philippine Cup game log
October 2014

Game	Date	Opponent	Score	High points	High rebounds	High assists	Location Attendance	Record
1	October 22	Purefoods	93–73	Abueva (21)	Thoss (13)	Hontiveros (3)	Smart Araneta Coliseum	1–0
2	October 28	Talk 'N Text	100–98	Abueva (26)	Abueva (22)	Abueva (3)	Smart Araneta Coliseum	2–0
3	October 31	Meralco	105–64	Manuel (17)	three players (6)	Banchero (8)	Smart Araneta Coliseum	3–0

November 2014

Game	Date	Opponent	Score	High points	High rebounds	High assists	Location Attendance	Record
4	November 5	San Miguel	66–63	Baguio (13)	Abueva (18)	four players (2)	Smart Araneta Coliseum	4–0
5	November 11	Kia	85–75	Abueva (23)	Abueva (20)	Casio (5)	Cuneta Astrodome	5–0
6	November 14	Blackwater	69–56	Menk (14)	Abueva (18)	Abueva (5)	Smart Araneta Coliseum	6–0
7	November 19	Barako Bull Energy	78–85	Abueva (16)	Abueva (12)	Abueva (7)	Smart Araneta Coliseum	6–1
8	November 22	GlobalPort	87–84	Abueva (19)	Thoss (8)	Thoss, Casio (3)	Xavier University – Ateneo de Cagayan Gym, Cagayan de Oro	7–1
9	November 28	NLEX	90–84	Hontiveros (21)	Abueva (19)	Abueva (4)	Smart Araneta Coliseum	8–1

December 2014

Game	Date	Opponent	Score	High points	High rebounds	High assists	Location Attendance	Record
10	December 2	Ginebra					Mall of Asia Arena	
11	December 5	Rain or Shine					Smart Araneta Coliseum (tentative)	

2014–15 schedule

=== Playoffs ===
==== Bracket ====
Quarterfinals (1st phase) (Higher seeds twice-to-beat)
3	Alaska	82
10	NLEX	78
6	Meralco	77
7	Purefoods Star	65
4	Talk 'N Text	105
9	Barako Bull	76
5	Barangay Ginebra	95
8	GlobalPort	78

Quarterfinals (2nd phase) (Single elimination)
3	Alaska	87
6	Meralco	69
4	Talk N Text	83
5	Barangay Ginebra	67

Semifinals (Best-of-7)
2	Rain or Shine	2
3	Alaska	4
1	San Miguel	4
4	Talk N' Text	0

Finals (Best-of-7)
3	Alaska	3
1	San Miguel	4

== Commissioner's Cup ==
=== Eliminations ===
==== Standings ====
Pos	Team	W	L	PCT	GB	Qualification
1	Rain or Shine Elasto Painters	8	3	.727 (Note: Head-to-head quotient: Rain or Shine 1.025, Talk 'N Text 1.010, Purefoods 0.969)	—	Twice-to-beat in the quarterfinals
2	Talk 'N Text Tropang Texters	8	3	.727	—	Twice-to-beat in the quarterfinals
3	Purefoods Star Hotshots	8	3	.727	—	Best-of-three quarterfinals
4	NLEX Road Warriors	6	5	.545 (Note: Head-to-head record: NLEX 1–0 Meralco)	2	Best-of-three quarterfinals
5	Meralco Bolts	6	5	.545	2	Best-of-three quarterfinals
6	Alaska Aces	5	6	.455 (Note: Head-to-head quotient: Alaska 1.021, Barako Bull 1.019, Barangay Ginebra 0.960)	3	Best-of-three quarterfinals
7	Barako Bull Energy	5	6	.455	3	Twice-to-win in the quarterfinals
8	Barangay Ginebra San Miguel	5	6	.455	3	Twice-to-win in the quarterfinals
9	San Miguel Beermen	4	7	.364 (Note: Head-to-head quotient: San Miguel 1.011, GlobalPort 0.995, Kia 0.994)	4	
10	GlobalPort Batang Pier	4	7	.364	4	
11	Kia Carnival	4	7	.364	4	
12	Blackwater Elite	3	8	.273	5	

Source: PBA.ph

=== Playoffs ===
==== Bracket ====
Quarterfinals
(#1 twice-to-beat)
1	Rain or Shine	92
8	Barangay Ginebra	91
(Best-of-3)
4	NLEX	0
5	Meralco	2
(#2 twice-to-beat)
2	Talk 'N Text	127
7	Barako Bull	97
(Best-of-3)
3	Purefoods Star	2
6	Alaska	0

Semifinals (Best-of-5)
1	Rain or Shine	3
5	Meralco	0
2	Talk 'N Text	3
3	Purefoods Star	1

Finals (Best-of-7)
1	Rain or Shine	3
2	Talk 'N Text	4

== Governors' Cup ==
=== Eliminations ===
==== Standings ====
Pos	Team	W	L	PCT	GB	Qualification
1	Alaska Aces	8	3	.727 (Note: Head-to-head record: Alaska 1–0 San Miguel)	—	Twice-to-beat in the quarterfinals
2	San Miguel Beermen	8	3	.727	—	Twice-to-beat in the quarterfinals
3	Rain or Shine Elasto Painters	7	4	.636 (Note: Head-to-head record: Rain or Shine 1–0 GlobalPort)	1	Twice-to-beat in the quarterfinals
4	GlobalPort Batang Pier	7	4	.636	1	Twice-to-beat in the quarterfinals
5	Star Hotshots	6	5	.545 (Note: Head-to-head record: Barako Bull 1–0 Star)	2	Twice-to-win in the quarterfinals
6	Barako Bull Energy	6	5	.545	2	Twice-to-win in the quarterfinals
7	Meralco Bolts	5	6	.455 (Note: Head-to-head quotient: Meralco 1.13, Barangay Ginebra 1.00, Kia 0.95, Talk 'N Text 0.93)	3	Twice-to-win in the quarterfinals
8	Barangay Ginebra San Miguel	5	6	.455	3	Twice-to-win in the quarterfinals
9	Kia Carnival	5	6	.455	3	
10	Talk 'N Text Tropang Texters	5	6	.455	3	
11	NLEX Road Warriors	3	8	.273	5	
12	Blackwater Elite	1	10	.091	7	

Source: PBA.ph

==== Bracket ====
Quarterfinals (Top 4 twice-to-beat)
1	Alaska	114
8	Ginebra	108
4	GlobalPort	73	94
5	Star	126	101
2	San Miguel	99	102
7	Meralco	106	86
3	Rain or Shine	134**
6	Barako Bull	132

Semifinals (Best-of-5)
1	Alaska	3
5	Star	0
2	San Miguel	3
3	Rain or Shine	1

Finals (Best-of-7)
1	Alaska	0
2	San Miguel	4

*Game went into double overtime

== Transactions ==
=== Trades ===
Pre-draft

August 11, 2014	To Alaska Eric Menk	To GlobalPort 2014 second round picks (Prince Caperal, 17th overall) (John Pinto, 19th overall)

Commissioner's Cup

March 14, 2015	To Alaska Nonoy Baclao; Globalport's 2017 first round pick	To GlobalPort Gabby Espinas; Alaska's 2017 first round pick

=== Recruited imports ===
Tournament	Name	Debuted	Last game	Record
Commissioner's Cup	D.J. Covington	February 3 (vs Purefoods)	February 17 (vs San Miguel)	2–2
Commissioner's Cup	Damion James	February 20 (vs Rain or Shine)	March 27 (vs Purefoods, Semifinals)	3–6
Governors' Cup	Romeo Travis	May 5 (vs Blackwater)	July 17 (vs San Miguel, Finals)	12–7
