= 2014–15 PBA Philippine Cup finals =

Philippine sporting competition

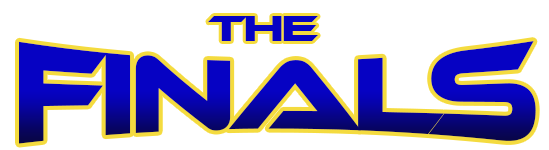
Team	Coach	Wins
(1) San Miguel Beermen	Leo Austria	4
(3) Alaska Aces	Alex Compton	3
- Dates: January 7–21, 2015
- MVP: Arwind Santos (San Miguel Beermen)
- Television: Local: Sports5; TV5; AksyonTV; Cignal PPV (HD); Fox Sports; International: AksyonTV International
- Announcers: See broadcast notes
- Radio network: DWFM (Radyo5)

Referees
- Game 1: J. Mariano, E. Aquino, N. Guevarra
- Game 2: A. Herrera, P. Balao, R. Gruta
- Game 3: N. Quilingen, E. Aquino, E. Tangkion
- Game 4: A. Herrera, N. Quillingen, N. Guevarra
- Game 5: A. Herrera, P. Balao, E. Tankion
- Game 6: A. Herrera, N. Quilingen, E. Tangkion
- Game 7: N. Quilingen, P. Balao, E. Tankion

PBA Philippine Cup finals chronology
- < 2013–14 2015–16 >

PBA finals chronology
- < 2014 Governors' 2015 Commissioner's >

The 2014–15 PBA Philippine Cup finals was the best-of-7 championship series of the 2014–15 PBA Philippine Cup, and the conclusion of the conference's playoffs. The San Miguel Beermen and the Alaska Aces competed for the 37th All-Filipino championship and the 113th overall championship contested by the league.

== Background ==
=== Road to the finals ===
San Miguel		Alaska
Finished 9–2 (0.818): Tied with Rain or Shine at 1st place	Elimination round	Finished 8–3 (0.727): Tied with Talk 'N Text at 3rd place
1.101 (1st place)	Tiebreaker*	1.020 (3rd place)
bye	Quarterfinals	First phase: Def. NLEX in one game Second phase: Def. Meralco, 87–69
Def. Talk 'N Text, 4–0 (best-of-seven)	Semifinals	Def. Rain or Shine, 4–2 (best-of-seven)

=== Head-to-head matchup ===
November 4, 2014

recap

San Miguel Beermen 63, Alaska Aces 66

Smart Araneta Coliseum, Quezon City

== Series summary ==
Team	Game 1*	Game 2	Game 3	Game 4	Game 5	Game 6	Game 7	Wins
San Miguel	82	100	70	88	93	76	80	4
Alaska	88	86	78	70	88	87	78	3
Venue	Araneta	Araneta	Araneta	Araneta	Araneta	Araneta	Araneta

*overtime

=== Game 1 ===
TV5

January 7
7:00pm

boxscore

San Miguel Beermen 82, Alaska Aces 88 (OT)
Scoring by quarter: 27–5, 18–26, 9–18, 20–25, Overtime: 8–14
Pts: Lutz 24; Rebs: Fajardo 17; Asts: Ross 7	Pts: Abueva 22; Rebs: Abueva 10; Asts: Banchero, Thoss 3
Alaska leads series, 1–0

Smart Araneta Coliseum, Quezon City
Referees: J. Mariano, E. Aquino, N. Guevarra

In the first quarter of Game One the San Miguel manage to have a double digit 27–5, but then on the second half of the game Alaska's Abueva and Hontiveros makes a scoring run to make a comeback. Then in overtime Alaska outscored the Beermen to steal Game One 88–82.

=== Game 2 ===
TV5

January 9
7:00pm

boxscore

San Miguel Beermen 100, Alaska Aces 86
Scoring by quarter: 32–28, 19–20, 21–22, 28–16
Pts: Santos 22; Rebs: Fajardo 12; Asts: Lutz, Ross 5	Pts: Thoss 16; Rebs: Abueva 9 Asts: Casio 3
Series tied, 1–1

Smart Araneta Coliseum, Quezon City
Referees: A. Herrera, P. Balao, R. Gruta

This is the physical game of the series featuring two Kapampangan superstars Arwind santos and Calvin Abueva. In the game Abueva elbowed Santos on the rebound, due to Santos blood he was forced to rest before coming back late in the third quarter to lead the Beermen to a scoring run and avoid Alaska's possible comeback.

=== Game 3 ===
TV5

January 11
5:00pm

boxscore

San Miguel Beermen 70, Alaska Aces 78
Scoring by quarter: 8–13, 27–14, 29–19, 6–32
Pts: Santos 20; Rebs: Santos 11; Asts: Cabagnot 4	Pts: Abueva 16; Rebs: Abueva 15; Asts: Abueva 5
Alaska leads series, 2–1

Smart Araneta Coliseum, Quezon City
Attendance: 13,785
Referees: N. Quillingen, E. Aquino, E. Tangkion

On Game Three SMB manage once again to manage big 20 or more points on three quarters, but the Aces prove again their resiliency to comeback outscoring the Beermen in fourth quarter 32–6.

=== Game 4 ===
TV5

January 14
7:00pm

boxscore

San Miguel Beermen 88, Alaska Aces 70
Scoring by quarter: 33–16, 16–10, 24–23, 15–21
Pts: Cabagnot 22; Rebs: Santos 14; Asts: Lutz 7	Pts: Abueva 22; Rebs: Abueva 7 Asts: Exciminiano, Casio 3
Series tied, 2–2

Smart Araneta Coliseum, Quezon City
Referees: A. Herrera, N. Quillingen, N. Guevarra

Prior to the start of Game Four June Mar Fajardo received his second straight Best Player of the Conference in Philippine Cup. Alex Cabagnot finally break his silence in the series tallying team high 22 points and gave the Beermen a dominant game once again.

=== Game 5 ===
TV5

January 16
7:00pm

boxscore

San Miguel Beermen 93, Alaska Aces 88
Scoring by quarter: 21–23, 20–18, 30–30, 22–17
Pts: Fajardo, Santos 19; Rebs: Fajardo 13; Asts: Cabagnot 8	Pts: Abueva 24; Rebs: Abueva 12; Asts: Banchero, Abueva 3
San Miguel leads series, 3–2

Smart Araneta Coliseum, Quezon City
Attendance: A. Herrera, P. Balao, E. Tankion

This game of this series was proved to be the closest scoring since the last four games, it was a see-saw battle the score was being tied after all three quarters. But on the fourth quarter the Beermen relied on their bench to make an opening scoring run on fourth quarter and win the game after great performances of Arwind Santos and June Mar Fajardo combining for 38 points and 10 blocks(19 points each and 5 blocks each). This also served as the first time the Beermen leads the series for pivotal 3–2 lead.

=== Game 6 ===
TV5

January 18
7:30pm

boxscore

San Miguel Beermen 76, Alaska Aces 87
Scoring by quarter: 23–17, 13–25, 20–21, 20–24
Pts: Santos 22; Rebs: Fajardo 13; Asts: Cabagnot 5	Pts: Hontiveros 18; Rebs: Thoss 9 Asts: Thoss, Manuel, Jazul 3
Series tied, 3–3

Smart Araneta Coliseum, Quezon City
Attendance: 14,259
Referees: A. Herrera, N. Quilingquen, E. Tangkion

The San Miguel once again manage to have double digit lead in the first quarter but then on the second to the fourth quarter the Alaska have controlled the whole behind a great performance from the former Beermen Dondon Hontiveros.

=== Game 7 ===
TV5

January 21
7:00pm

boxscore

San Miguel Beermen 80, Alaska Aces 78
Scoring by quarter: 21–12, 27–15, 14–32, 18–19
Pts: Santos 22; Rebs: Fajardo 25; Asts: Cabagnot 6	Pts: Abueva 23; Rebs: Abueva 15; Asts: Abueva, Exciminiano, Jazul 2
San Miguel wins series, 4–3

Smart Araneta Coliseum, Quezon City
Attendance: 22,511
Referees: N. Quilingen, P. Balao, E. Tankion

The San Miguel and Alaska battled for their third Game Seven of their other previous PBA finals meeting which Alaska winning twice of the two games seven meeting. This game was started in the first quarter by Fajardo's amazing euro step Sonny Thoss before the Beeremen lead the Aces a double digit point lead after great shooting from Arwind Santos. The San Miguel lead Alaska dominantly 48–27 at the half. But the Aces again proved their great comeback led by Calvin Abueva came close after third quarter 62–59, but on fourth quarter the Alaska steal the lead and lead as many as 6 points under 4 minutes remaining in the game 74–68. The Beeremen then make their own rally having 12–6 run then with one minute remaining in the game and the clock is winding down Arwind Santos makes a crucial three pointer with 43 seconds remaining in the game to push San Miguel lead back to one 79–78 then he grabbed also a crucial defensive rebound after Sonny Thoss missed a shot over Fajardo. In the one possession after Abueva missed a floater Ronald Tubid grabs a defensive rebound but call a time out that SMB doesn't have any more. Dondon Hontiveros then missed a crucial technical free throw, on the last play were San Miguel has the ball Chris Lutz inbound the ball to June Mar Fajardo who had been forced to a jumpball by Abueva. On the jumpball Abueva won the tip over Fajardo and the ball goes to Thoss who finds Jvee Casio for game winning three pointer but his shot missed before the buzzer sounded.

== Rosters ==
San Miguel Beermen roster
Players
Coaches

Pos.	#	POB	Name	Height	Weight	DOB (YYYY–MM–DD)	From
F	1	(Philippines)	Rico Maierhofer	6 ft 5 in (1.96 m)	175 lb (79 kg)	1985-11-04	De La Salle
SG	3	(United States)	Chris Lutz	6 ft 3 in (1.91 m)	200 lb (91 kg)	1985-02-11	Marshall
PG	5	(Philippines)	Alex Cabagnot	6 ft 0 in (1.83 m)	175 lb (79 kg)	1982-12-08	Hawaiʻi–Hilo
PG	6	(United States)	Chris Ross	6 ft 1 in (1.85 m)	180 lb (82 kg)	1985-03-08	Marshall
SG	13	(United States)	Marcio Lassiter	6 ft 3 in (1.91 m)	185 lb (84 kg)	1987-05-16	Cal State Fullerton
C	15	(Philippines)	June Mar Fajardo	6 ft 11 in (2.11 m)	270 lb (122 kg)	1989-11-17	Cebu
C	18	(Philippines)	Doug Kramer	6 ft 5 in (1.96 m)	235 lb (107 kg)	1983-07-10	Ateneo
SF	21	(Philippines)	Nelbert Omolon	6 ft 4 in (1.93 m)	185 lb (84 kg)	1980-06-30	Philippine Christian
G	23	(Philippines)	Ronald Pascual (R)	6 ft 3 in (1.91 m)	185 lb (84 kg)	1988-06-23	San Sebastian
PG	25	(Philippines)	Jeric Fortuna	5 ft 7 in (1.70 m)	170 lb (77 kg)	1991-11-25	UST
G/F	29	(Philippines)	Arwind Santos (C)	6 ft 4 in (1.93 m)	170 lb (77 kg)	1981-06-10	Far Eastern
F/C	33	(Australia)	David Semerad (R)	6 ft 5 in (1.96 m)	230 lb (104 kg)	1991-04-25	San Beda
F/C	41	(Philippines)	Justin Chua	6 ft 6 in (1.98 m)	232 lb (105 kg)	1989-07-13	Ateneo
SG	71	(Philippines)	Ronald Tubid	6 ft 0 in (1.83 m)	185 lb (84 kg)	1981-10-15	UE

Head coach

- (Philippines) Leo Austria (Lyceum)

Assistant coach(es)

- (Philippines) Biboy Ravanes (Cebu)
- (United States) John Todd Purves (consultant)
- (Philippines) Jorge Gallent
- (Philippines) Dayong Mendoza
- (Philippines) Riel Banaria
- (Philippines) Boyzie Zamar
- (Philippines) Peter Martin

Team manager

- (Philippines) Gee Abanilla (De La Salle)

Legend

- (C) Team captain
- (CI) Commissioner's Cup Import
- (GI) Governors' Cup Import
- (EI) EASL Import
- (DP) Unsigned draft pick
- (FA) Free agent
- (IN) Inactive
- (S) Suspended
- (R) Rookie
- Injured

Alaska Aces roster
Players
Coaches

Pos.	#	POB	Name	Height	Weight	DOB (YYYY–MM–DD)	From
C	1	(Philippines)	Samigue Eman	6 ft 10 in (2.08 m)	260 lb (118 kg)	1982-03-12	Mindanao
G	2	(United States)	Chris Banchero (R)	6 ft 1 in (1.85 m)	185 lb (84 kg)	1989-01-24	Seattle Pacific
G/F	3	(Philippines)	Cyrus Baguio	6 ft 2 in (1.88 m)	180 lb (82 kg)	1980-08-19	UST
C	7	(Papua New Guinea)	Sonny Thoss	6 ft 8 in (2.03 m)	205 lb (93 kg)	1981-12-07	James Cook
F	8	(Philippines)	Calvin Abueva	6 ft 2 in (1.88 m)	190 lb (86 kg)	1988-02-04	San Sebastian
G/F	11	(Philippines)	Rome dela Rosa (R)	6 ft 3 in (1.91 m)	180 lb (82 kg)	1990-12-11	San Beda
F	15	(Germany)	Josh Vanlandingham (IN)	6 ft 4 in (1.93 m)	205 lb (93 kg)	1984-01-22	Pacific Lutheran
G	17	(Philippines)	Chris Exciminiano	5 ft 11 in (1.80 m)	185 lb (84 kg)	1988-11-17	Far Eastern
PF	21	(Philippines)	Bugia, Paolo (IN)	6 ft 6 in (1.98 m)	215 lb (98 kg)	1981-01-19	Ateneo
PF	24	(Philippines)	Manuel, Vic	6 ft 4 in (1.93 m)	200 lb (91 kg)	1987-06-18	PSBA
G	25	(Philippines)	Dondon Hontiveros	6 ft 2 in (1.88 m)	170 lb (77 kg)	1977-06-01	Cebu
F	27	(Philippines)	Gabby Espinas (injured)	6 ft 4 in (1.93 m)	194 lb (88 kg)	1982-01-03	Philippine Christian
F/C	30	(United States)	Eric Menk	6 ft 7 in (2.01 m)	220 lb (100 kg)	1974-08-24	Lake Superior State
G	31	(Philippines)	RJ Jazul	5 ft 10 in (1.78 m)	170 lb (77 kg)	1986-04-11	Letran
F	35	(United States)	Tony dela Cruz (C)	6 ft 5 in (1.96 m)	178 lb (81 kg)	1978-08-24	UC Irvine
G	42	(Philippines)	JVee Casio	5 ft 9 in (1.75 m)	170 lb (77 kg)	1986-09-01	De La Salle

Head coach

- (United States) Alex Compton (Cornell)

Assistant coach(es)

- (Philippines) Louie Alas (Adamson)
- (Philippines) Topex Robinson (San Sebastian)
- (Philippines) Monch Gavieres

Team manager

- (Philippines) Dickie Bachmann^{[a]} (De La Salle)

Legend

- (C) Team captain
- (CI) Commissioner's Cup Import
- (GI) Governors' Cup Import
- (EI) EASL Import
- (DP) Unsigned draft pick
- (FA) Free agent
- (IN) Inactive
- (S) Suspended
- (R) Rookie
- Injured

Roster

- ^{a} also serves as Alaska's board governor.

== Broadcast notes ==
All of the games were aired live on TV5, AksyonTV and Fox Sports, except for Game 5 that was delayed at TV5 and AksyonTV due to the News5 coverage of Pope Francis's visit to the Philippines.

Game	Sports5			Fox Sports	
Game	Play-by-play	Analyst(s)	Courtside reporters	Play-by-play	Analyst(s)
Game 1	Magoo Marjon	Eric Reyes and Ali Peek	Rizza Diaz	Patricia Bermudez-Hizon	Charles Tiu
Game 2	Mico Halili	Quinito Henson and Richard del Rosario	Apple David	Nikko Ramos	Ronnie Magsanoc
Game 3	Charlie Cuna	Ryan Gregorio and Luigi Trillo	Erika Padilla	Mico Halili	Charles Tiu
Game 4	James Velazquez	Dominic Uy and Ronnie Magsanoc	Sel Guevara	Patricia Bermudez-Hizon	Vince Hizon
Game 5	Magoo Marjon	Andy Jao and Luigi Trillo	Rizza Diaz	Mico Halili	Kirk Long
Game 6	Mico Halili	Eric Reyes and Richard del Rosario	Sel Guevara	Nikko Ramos	Charles Tiu
Game 7	Magoo Marjon	Quinito Henson and Ronnie Magsanoc	Erika Padilla	Patricia Bermudez-Hizon	Vince Hizon

- Additional Game 7 crew:
  - Trophy presentation: Nikko Ramos
  - Dugout celebration interviewer: Sel Guevara
