= 2014–15 PBA season =

40th PBA season

- Duration: October 19, 2014 – July 17, 2015
- Teams: 12
- TV partner(s): Local: Sports5; TV5; AksyonTV; Fox Sports; International: AksyonTV International

2014 PBA draft
- Top draft pick: Stanley Pringle
- Picked by: GlobalPort Batang Pier
- Season MVP: June Mar Fajardo (San Miguel Beermen)
- Top scorer: Terrence Romeo (GlobalPort Batang Pier)
- Philippine Cup champions: San Miguel Beermen
- Philippine Cup runners-up: Alaska Aces
- Commissioner's Cup champions: Talk 'N Text Tropang Texters
- Commissioner's Cup runners-up: Rain or Shine Elasto Painters
- Governors' Cup champions: San Miguel Beermen
- Governors' Cup runners-up: Alaska Aces

Seasons
- ← 2013–14 2015–16 →

The 2014–15 PBA season was the 40th season of the Philippine Basketball Association (PBA). The season formally opened on October 19, 2014, and finished on July 17, 2015. The league continued to use the three-conference format, starting with the Philippine Cup. The Commissioner's Cup and the Governors' Cup were the second and third conferences for this season, respectively.

This was also the first season that the league had 12 regular teams. The two new teams were Kia Sorento and Blackwater Elite. Although the NLEX Road Warriors had been approved as an expansion team, their owners instead opted to buy the Air21 Express franchise.

The first event of the season was the 2014 PBA Expansion Draft in July, for expansion teams Blackwater Elite and Kia Sorento, followed by the 2014 PBA draft, held on August 24, 2014.

This season previously held the record for most games played overall in a season, having 257 games played throughout the whole year. It surpassed the previous record of 249 games, previously set during the 2012–13 season. This record was later broken the following season.

== Board of governors ==
=== Executive committee ===
- Chito Salud (Commissioner)
- Patrick Gregorio (Chairman, representing Talk 'N Text Tropang Texters)
- Robert Non (Vice-Chairman, representing San Miguel Beermen)
- Eric Arejola (Treasurer, representing GlobalPort Batang Pier)

== Teams ==
Team	Company	Governor	Alternate Governor
Alaska Aces	Alaska Milk Corporation	Richard Bachmann	
Barako Bull Energy	Energy Food and Drinks Inc.	Manny Alvarez	
Barangay Ginebra San Miguel	Ginebra San Miguel, Inc.	Alfrancis Chua	
Blackwater Elite	Ever Bilena Cosmetics, Inc.	Silliman Sy	Wilbert Loa
GlobalPort Batang Pier	Sultan 900 Capital, Inc.	Michael Romero	Nathaniel Romero / Erick Arejola
Kia Carnival	Columbian Autocar Corporation	Jose Alvarez	Ginia Domingo
Meralco Bolts	Manila Electric Company	Al Panlilio	Ryan Gregorio / Betty Siy-Yap
NLEX Road Warriors	Metro Pacific Investments Corporation	Ramoncito Fernandez	Rodrigo Franco / Christopher Lizo
Rain or Shine Elasto Painters	Asian Coatings Philippines, Inc.	Mamerto Mondragon	Edison Orbania
San Miguel Beermen	San Miguel Brewery, Inc.	Robert Huang	Robert Non
Star Hotshots	San Miguel Pure Foods Company, Inc.	Rene Pardo	
Talk 'N Text Tropang Texters	Smart Communications	Manuel V. Pangilinan	Victorico Vargas

== Arenas ==
Metro Manila venues of the PBA.
Provincial venues of the PBA that hosted one game day (red), and two or more game days (blue).

Like several Metro Manila-centric leagues, most games are held at arenas within Metro Manila, and sometimes, Antipolo. Games outside this area are called "out-of-town" games, and are usually played on Saturdays. Provincial arenas usually host one game, rarely two; these arenas typically host only once per season, but could return occasionally.

=== Main arenas ===
Arena	City
Cuneta Astrodome	Pasay
Filoil Flying V Centre	San Juan
Mall of Asia Arena	Pasay
PhilSports Arena	Pasig
Smart Araneta Coliseum	Quezon City
Ynares Center	Antipolo

=== Out-of-town arenas ===
Aside from games outside Metro Manila and Antipolo, the PBA played two games outside the Philippines, in Dubai. It was the second time the league held games in the United Arab Emirates.

Arena	City	Date	Match-up
Philippine Arena	Bocaue, Bulacan	October 19, 2014	Kia vs. Blackwater; Talk 'N Text vs. Barangay Ginebra
Quezon Convention Center	Lucena	October 25, 2014	Barangay Ginebra vs. Kia
Mindanao Civic Center Gymnasium	Tubod, Lanao del Norte	November 8, 2014	NLEX vs. San Miguel
Mindanao Civic Center Gymnasium	Tubod, Lanao del Norte	February 28, 2015	Kia vs. Blackwater
University of Southeastern Philippines Gym	Davao City	November 15, 2014	Barangay Ginebra vs. Meralco
University of Southeastern Philippines Gym	Davao City	March 14, 2015	Talk 'N Text vs. Purefoods Star
Xavier University – Ateneo de Cagayan Gym	Cagayan de Oro	November 22, 2014	Alaska vs. GlobalPort
Xavier University – Ateneo de Cagayan Gym	Cagayan de Oro	February 21, 2015	San Miguel vs. Meralco
Alonte Sports Arena	Biñan, Laguna	November 23, 2014	Talk 'N Text vs. Barako Bull; Meralco vs. San Mig
Alonte Sports Arena	Biñan, Laguna	November 29, 2014	Blackwater vs. Talk 'N Text
Alonte Sports Arena	Biñan, Laguna	February 1, 2015	Blackwater vs. Talk 'N Text; Barangay Ginebra vs. Barako Bull
Dipolog Sports Center	Dipolog, Zamboanga del Norte	February 14, 2015	Purefoods Star vs. Rain or Shine
Dipolog Sports Center	Dipolog, Zamboanga del Norte	May 16, 2015	Ginebra vs. Blackwater
Panabo Multi-purpose Tourism, Sports and Cultural Center	Panabo, Davao del Norte	March 21, 2015	Barangay Ginebra vs. GlobalPort
Panabo Multi-purpose Tourism, Sports and Cultural Center	Panabo, Davao del Norte	June 20, 2015	Alaska vs. San Miguel
Al Shabab Al Arabi Club Dubai	Dubai	May 21, 2015	GlobalPort vs. Rain or Shine
Al Shabab Al Arabi Club Dubai	Dubai	May 22, 2015	Barangay Ginebra vs. Rain or Shine
Angeles University Foundation Gym	Angeles City	May 30, 2015	Kia vs. Purefoods Star
La Salle Coliseum	Bacolod	June 6, 2015	Rain or Shine vs. Talk 'N Text

== Transactions ==
=== Player movement ===
- The expansion draft for incoming teams Blackwater Elite and Kia Sorento was held on July 18, 2014. Danny Ildefonso of the Meralco Bolts and Reil Cervantes of Barako Bull Energy were selected as the first picks of Blackwater and Kia respectively.

=== Retirement ===
- January 9, 2015: Jimmy Alapag formally announced his retirement during a press conference at the Smart Araneta Coliseum prior to the second game of the 2014–15 PBA Philippine Cup finals between the Alaska Aces and the San Miguel Beermen. However, he came out of retirement after nine months and played for two more seasons with the Meralco Bolts. He later retired for the second time during the end of the 2015–16 season.
- May 18, 2015: Kerby Raymundo officially announced his retirement.

=== Coaching changes ===
- July 9, 2014: Talk 'N Text Tropang Texters head coach Norman Black was moved to the Meralco Bolts, replacing Ryan Gregorio as head coach. Replacing Black in Talk 'N Text is assistant coach Jong Uichico.
- August 2, 2014: Leo Austria was named as the head coach of the San Miguel Beermen. Coach Biboy Ravanes was demoted to assistant coach and active consultant Todd Purves will have a minimal role with the team.
- October 18, 2014: Barako Bull Energy fired head coach Siot Tanquingcen. He was replaced by assistant coach Koy Banal
- November 27, 2014: GlobalPort Batang Pier appointed assistant coach Eric Gonzales as the team's interim head coach, while former head coach Pido Jarencio was reassigned as the team's consultant.
- January 5, 2015: Team manager Alfrancis Chua announced the reappointment of Ato Agustin as Ginebra head coach after two conferences with Jeffrey Cariaso. Cariaso was then hired by Alaska as an assistant coach.
- March 30, 2015: Barangay Ginebra San Miguel fired head coach Ato Agustin. He was replaced by assistant coach Frankie Lim.
- March 31, 2015: GlobalPort Batang Pier reinstated consultant Pido Jarencio as the team's head coach. Interim head coach Eric Gonzales was relegated as the assistant coach.

== Notable events ==
=== Pre-season ===
- The PBA's developmental league held its annual draft at the PBA office in Libis, Quezon City on September 15. Moala Tautuaa was selected by the Cagayan Valley Rising Suns as the first pick of the draft.
- Team officials of the San Mig Super Coffee Mixers announced that the team will be renamed as the Purefoods Star Hotshots starting this season's Philippine Cup.

=== Philippine Cup ===
- The league's opening ceremonies and the first two games of the elimination round at the Philippine Arena set the all-time indoor Philippine sports attendance record of 52,612.
- The Grand Slam championship ring ceremony of the Purefoods Star Hotshots (formerly known as the San Mig Super Coffee Mixers) was held on October 22, before the start of their game against the Alaska Aces.
- The Purefoods Star Hotshots retired the jersey numbers of Rey Evangelista (#7) and Jerry Codiñera (#44) on November 9, 2014, before their game against Barangay Ginebra San Miguel. The team also wore retro style jerseys with similarities from their 1988 uniforms.

=== Commissioner's Cup ===
- The Talk 'N Text Tropang Texters retired the jersey number of Jimmy Alapag during the halftime of the All-Star Game in Puerto Princesa Coliseum, Palawan on March 5, 2015, where he was added as the 13th man of the South All-Stars.
- Columbian Autocar Corporation (CAC) announced that they will change the moniker of their PBA team to Kia Carnival for the Commissioner's Cup.
- On February 15, 2015, Commissioner Chito Salud announced during a press conference at the Mall of Asia Arena that he will resign as the commissioner of the league at the end of the 2014-15 season for personal reasons. The board of governors, led by chairman Patrick Gregorio told the media that a replacement will be named before the end of the ongoing Commissioner's Cup. The replacement will be assigned as the deputy commissioner at the start of the Governors' Cup.
- During the board of governors meeting on March 7, 2015, they have decided to restructure the league and create the president/chief executive officer position to manage the league's marketing, expansion and business related matters. The commissioner position (which will also be the league's chief operating officer) will handle the game-related matters. Outgoing commissioner Chito Salud has been named as the league's first president/CEO.

=== Governors' Cup ===
- The Purefoods Star Hotshots silently dropped the "Purefoods" brand on their team name. The team will now be known as the "Star Hotshots". The team's new colors and uniforms debuted in their game against the NLEX Road Warriors last May 10.
- On May 14, Basketball Coaches Association of the Philippines (BCAP) president and former PBA coach Chito Narvasa was named as the 9th commissioner of the league, replacing Chito Salud at the end of the 2014-15 season.

== Liga ng Bayan ==
A set of preseason games named "Liga ng Bayan" was scheduled from September 12 to October 12 and were held on various cities around the country. The results of the games are as follows:

September 12

San Miguel Beermen 78, Rain or Shine Elasto Painters 77

Angeles University Foundation Sports Arena, Angeles City

October 4

Kia Sorento 77, Blackwater Elite 88

Alonte Sports Arena, Biñan, Laguna

October 4

San Mig Super Coffee Mixers 81, NLEX Road Warriors 84

Alonte Sports Arena, Biñan, Laguna

October 5

Barangay Ginebra San Miguel 79, Meralco Bolts 91

Panabo City Tourism, Cultural and Sports Center, Panabo, Davao del Norte

October 10

Alaska Aces 109, Barako Bull Energy 82

Puerto Princesa Coliseum, Puerto Princesa

October 11

Meralco Bolts 83, San Miguel Beermen 83

Blue Eagle Gym, Quezon City

October 12

Talk 'N Text Tropang Texters 78, GlobalPort Batang Pier 88

Ibalong Centrum for Recreation, Legazpi Albay

== Opening ceremonies ==
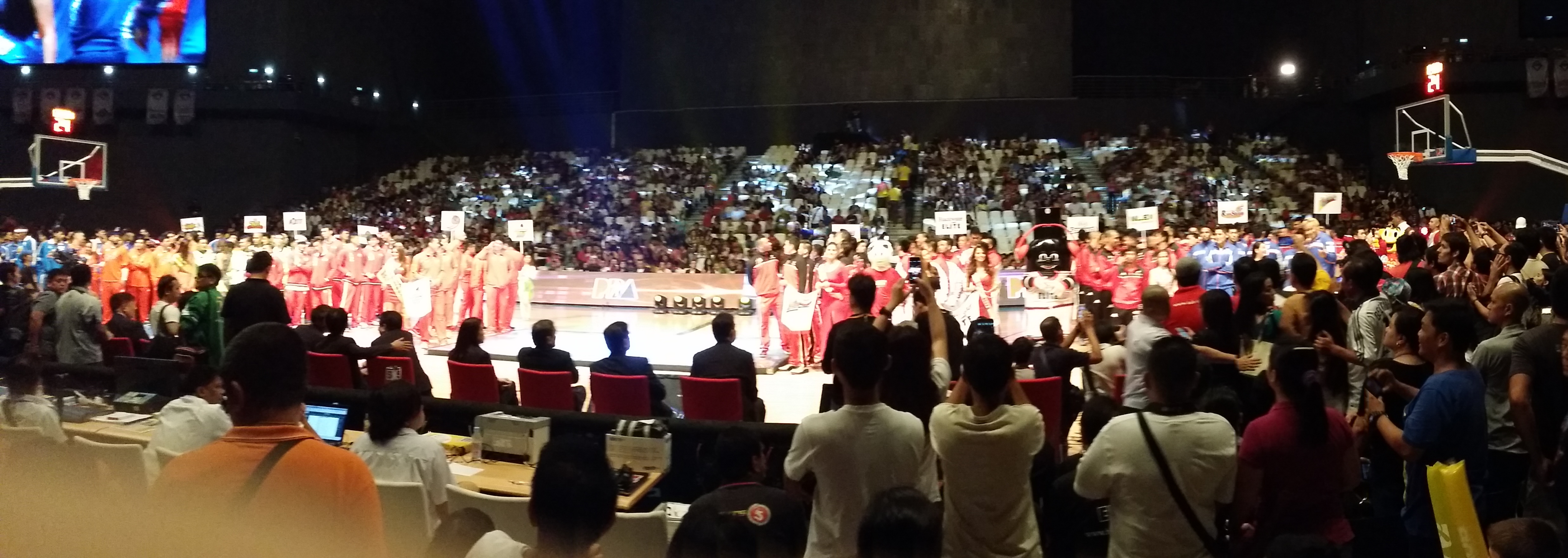
The parade of teams during the opening ceremonies of the 2014-15 PBA season at the Philippine Arena.

The opening ceremonies for this season was held at the Philippine Arena in Ciudad de Victoria, Bocaue, Bulacan on October 19, 2014. The first games of the Philippine Cup, Kia vs Blackwater and Barangay Ginebra vs Talk 'N Text immediately followed. The muses for the participating teams are as follows:

Team	Muse
Alaska Aces	Michele Gumabao
Barako Bull Energy	Nathalie den Dekker
Barangay Ginebra San Miguel	Ellen Adarna
Blackwater Elite	Sunshine Cruz; Annalie Forbes
GlobalPort Batang Pier	Rachel Daquis; Cha Cruz
Kia Sorento	Jinkee Pacquiao
Meralco Bolts	Ritz Azul
NLEX Road Warriors	Dianne Medina
Purefoods Star Hotshots	Mary Jean Lastimosa
Rain or Shine Elasto Painters	Glennifer Perido
San Miguel Beermen	Alice Dixson; Erica Adachi; Alaina Bergsma
Talk 'N Text Tropang Texters	Megan Young

== 2014–15 Philippine Cup ==
=== Elimination round ===
Pos	Team	W	L	PCT	GB	Qualification
1	San Miguel Beermen	9	2	.818 (Note: Head-to-head record: San Miguel 1–0 Rain or Shine)	—	Advance to semifinals
2	Rain or Shine Elasto Painters	9	2	.818	—	Advance to semifinals
3	Alaska Aces	8	3	.727 (Note: Head-to-head record: Alaska 1–0 Talk 'N Text)	1	Twice-to-beat in the quarterfinals
4	Talk 'N Text Tropang Texters	8	3	.727	1	Twice-to-beat in the quarterfinals
5	Barangay Ginebra San Miguel	6	5	.545 (Note: Head-to-head quotient: Barangay Ginebra 1.07, Meralco 1.06, Purefoods Star 0.89)	3	Twice-to-beat in the quarterfinals
6	Meralco Bolts	6	5	.545	3	Twice-to-beat in the quarterfinals
7	Purefoods Star Hotshots	6	5	.545	3	Twice-to-win in the quarterfinals
8	GlobalPort Batang Pier	5	6	.455	4	Twice-to-win in the quarterfinals
9	Barako Bull Energy	4	7	.364 (Note: Head-to-head record: Barako Bull 1–0 NLEX)	5	Twice-to-win in the quarterfinals
10	NLEX Road Warriors	4	7	.364	5	Twice-to-win in the quarterfinals
11	Kia Sorento	1	10	.091	8	
12	Blackwater Elite	0	11	.000	9	

Source: PBA.ph

=== Playoffs ===
Quarterfinals (1st phase) (Higher seeds twice-to-beat)
3	Alaska	82
10	NLEX	78
6	Meralco	77
7	Purefoods Star	65
4	Talk 'N Text	105
9	Barako Bull	76
5	Barangay Ginebra	95
8	GlobalPort	78

Quarterfinals (2nd phase) (Single elimination)
3	Alaska	87
6	Meralco	69
4	Talk N Text	83
5	Barangay Ginebra	67

Semifinals (Best-of-7)
2	Rain or Shine	2
3	Alaska	4
1	San Miguel	4
4	Talk N' Text	0

Finals (Best-of-7)
3	Alaska	3
1	San Miguel	4

==== Quarterfinals ====
===== 1st phase =====
Team 1	Series	Team 2	Game 1	Game 2
(3) Alaska Aces*	1–0	(10) NLEX Road Warriors	82–78	—
(4) Talk 'N Text Tropang Texters*	1–0	(9) Barako Bull Energy	105–76	—
(5) Barangay Ginebra San Miguel*	1–0	(8) GlobalPort Batang Pier	95–78	—
(6) Meralco Bolts*	1–0	(7) Purefoods Star Hotshots	77–65	—

*Team has twice-to-beat advantage. Team #1 only has to win once, while Team #2 has to win twice.

===== 2nd phase =====
Team 1	Score	Team 2
(3) Alaska Aces	87–69	(6) Meralco Bolts
(4) Talk 'N Text Tropang Texters	83–67	(5) Barangay Ginebra San Miguel

==== Semifinals ====
Team 1	Series	Team 2	Game 1	Game 2	Game 3	Game 4	Game 5	Game 6	Game 7
(1) San Miguel Beermen	4–0	(4) Talk 'N Text Tropang Texters	109–86	87–81	96–95	100–87	—	—	—
(2) Rain or Shine Elasto Painters	2–4	(3) Alaska Aces	80–87	102–95	78–94	98–91	88–93	76–79	—

==== Finals ====
Team 1	Series	Team 2	Game 1	Game 2	Game 3	Game 4	Game 5	Game 6	Game 7
(1) San Miguel Beermen	4–3	(3) Alaska Aces	82–88 (OT)	100–86	70–78	88–70	93–88	76–87	80–78

- Finals MVP: Arwind Santos (San Miguel Beermen)
- Best Player of the Conference: June Mar Fajardo (San Miguel Beermen)

== 2015 Commissioner's Cup ==
=== Elimination round ===
Pos	Team	W	L	PCT	GB	Qualification
1	Rain or Shine Elasto Painters	8	3	.727 (Note: Head-to-head quotient: Rain or Shine 1.025, Talk 'N Text 1.010, Purefoods 0.969)	—	Twice-to-beat in the quarterfinals
2	Talk 'N Text Tropang Texters	8	3	.727	—	Twice-to-beat in the quarterfinals
3	Purefoods Star Hotshots	8	3	.727	—	Best-of-three quarterfinals
4	NLEX Road Warriors	6	5	.545 (Note: Head-to-head record: NLEX 1–0 Meralco)	2	Best-of-three quarterfinals
5	Meralco Bolts	6	5	.545	2	Best-of-three quarterfinals
6	Alaska Aces	5	6	.455 (Note: Head-to-head quotient: Alaska 1.021, Barako Bull 1.019, Barangay Ginebra 0.960)	3	Best-of-three quarterfinals
7	Barako Bull Energy	5	6	.455	3	Twice-to-win in the quarterfinals
8	Barangay Ginebra San Miguel	5	6	.455	3	Twice-to-win in the quarterfinals
9	San Miguel Beermen	4	7	.364 (Note: Head-to-head quotient: San Miguel 1.011, GlobalPort 0.995, Kia 0.994)	4	
10	GlobalPort Batang Pier	4	7	.364	4	
11	Kia Carnival	4	7	.364	4	
12	Blackwater Elite	3	8	.273	5	

Source: PBA.ph

=== Playoffs ===
Quarterfinals
(#1 twice-to-beat)
1	Rain or Shine	92
8	Barangay Ginebra	91
(Best-of-3)
4	NLEX	0
5	Meralco	2
(#2 twice-to-beat)
2	Talk 'N Text	127
7	Barako Bull	97
(Best-of-3)
3	Purefoods Star	2
6	Alaska	0

Semifinals (Best-of-5)
1	Rain or Shine	3
5	Meralco	0
2	Talk 'N Text	3
3	Purefoods Star	1

Finals (Best-of-7)
1	Rain or Shine	3
2	Talk 'N Text	4

==== Quarterfinals ====
Team 1	Series	Team 2	Game 1	Game 2
(1) Rain or Shine Elasto Painters*	1–0	(8) Barangay Ginebra San Miguel	92–91	—
(2) Talk 'N Text Tropang Texters*	1–0	(7) Barako Bull Energy	127–97	—

Team 1	Series	Team 2	Game 1	Game 2	Game 3
(3) Purefoods Star Hotshots	2–0	(6) Alaska Aces	120–86	96–89	—
(4) NLEX Road Warriors	0–2	(5) Meralco Bolts	82–97	85–91 (OT)	—

*Team has twice-to-beat advantage. Team #1 only has to win once, while Team #2 has to win twice.

==== Semifinals ====
Team 1	Series	Team 2	Game 1	Game 2	Game 3	Game 4	Game 5
(1) Rain or Shine Elasto Painters	3–0	(5) Meralco Bolts	99–86	92–82	107–98	—	—
(2) Talk 'N Text Tropang Texters	3–1	(3) Purefoods Star Hotshots	94–100	93–77	111–107	79–66	—

==== Finals ====
Team 1	Series	Team 2	Game 1	Game 2	Game 3	Game 4	Game 5	Game 6	Game 7
(1) Rain or Shine Elasto Painters	3–4	(2) Talk 'N Text Tropang Texters	92–99	116–108	109–97	92–99	94–103	101–93	119–121 (2OT)

- Finals MVP: Ranidel de Ocampo (Talk 'N Text Tropang Texters)
- Best Player of the Conference: Jayson Castro (Talk 'N Text Tropang Texters)
- Bobby Parks Best Import of the Conference: Wayne Chism (Rain or Shine Elasto Painters)

== 2015 Governors' Cup ==
=== Elimination round ===
Pos	Team	W	L	PCT	GB	Qualification
1	Alaska Aces	8	3	.727 (Note: Head-to-head record: Alaska 1–0 San Miguel)	—	Twice-to-beat in the quarterfinals
2	San Miguel Beermen	8	3	.727	—	Twice-to-beat in the quarterfinals
3	Rain or Shine Elasto Painters	7	4	.636 (Note: Head-to-head record: Rain or Shine 1–0 GlobalPort)	1	Twice-to-beat in the quarterfinals
4	GlobalPort Batang Pier	7	4	.636	1	Twice-to-beat in the quarterfinals
5	Star Hotshots	6	5	.545 (Note: Head-to-head record: Barako Bull 1–0 Star)	2	Twice-to-win in the quarterfinals
6	Barako Bull Energy	6	5	.545	2	Twice-to-win in the quarterfinals
7	Meralco Bolts	5	6	.455 (Note: Head-to-head quotient: Meralco 1.13, Barangay Ginebra 1.00, Kia 0.95, Talk 'N Text 0.93)	3	Twice-to-win in the quarterfinals
8	Barangay Ginebra San Miguel	5	6	.455	3	Twice-to-win in the quarterfinals
9	Kia Carnival	5	6	.455	3	
10	Talk 'N Text Tropang Texters	5	6	.455	3	
11	NLEX Road Warriors	3	8	.273	5	
12	Blackwater Elite	1	10	.091	7	

Source: PBA.ph

=== Playoffs ===
Quarterfinals (Top 4 twice-to-beat)
1	Alaska	114
8	Ginebra	108
4	GlobalPort	73	94
5	Star	126	101
2	San Miguel	99	102
7	Meralco	106	86
3	Rain or Shine	134**
6	Barako Bull	132

Semifinals (Best-of-5)
1	Alaska	3
5	Star	0
2	San Miguel	3
3	Rain or Shine	1

Finals (Best-of-7)
1	Alaska	0
2	San Miguel	4

*Game went into double overtime

==== Quarterfinals ====
Team 1	Series	Team 2	Game 1	Game 2
(1) Alaska Aces*	1–0	(8) Barangay Ginebra San Miguel	114–108	—
(2) San Miguel Beermen*	1–1	(7) Meralco Bolts	99–106	102–86
(3) Rain or Shine Elasto Painters*	1–0	(6) Barako Bull Energy	134–132 (2OT)	—
(4) GlobalPort Batang Pier*	0–2	(5) Star Hotshots	73–126	94–101

*Team has twice-to-beat advantage. Team #1 only has to win once, while Team #2 has to win twice.

==== Semifinals ====
Team 1	Series	Team 2	Game 1	Game 2	Game 3	Game 4	Game 5
(1) Alaska Aces	3–0	(5) Star Hotshots	97–91	95–74	82–77	—	—
(2) San Miguel Beermen	3–1	(3) Rain or Shine Elasto Painters	101–95	110–113	114–108	117–110	—

==== Finals ====
Team 1	Series	Team 2	Game 1	Game 2	Game 3	Game 4	Game 5	Game 6	Game 7
(1) Alaska Aces	0–4	(2) San Miguel Beermen	78–108	95–103	89–96	81–91	—	—	—

- Finals MVP: June Mar Fajardo (San Miguel Beermen)
- Best Player of the Conference: June Mar Fajardo (San Miguel Beermen)
- Bobby Parks Best Import of the Conference: Romeo Travis (Alaska Aces)

== Individual awards ==
=== Leo Awards ===
- Most Valuable Player: June Mar Fajardo (San Miguel)
- Rookie of the Year: Stanley Pringle (GlobalPort)
- First Mythical Team:
  - Jayson Castro (Talk 'N Text)
  - Paul Lee (Rain or Shine)
  - Greg Slaughter (Barangay Ginebra)
  - June Mar Fajardo (San Miguel)
  - Arwind Santos (San Miguel)
- Second Mythical Team:
  - Stanley Pringle (GlobalPort)
  - Terrence Romeo (GlobalPort)
  - Asi Taulava (NLEX)
  - Ranidel de Ocampo (Talk 'N Text)
  - Calvin Abueva (Alaska)
- All-Defensive Team:
  - Chris Ross (San Miguel)
  - Chris Exciminiano (Alaska)
  - June Mar Fajardo (San Miguel)
  - Gabe Norwood (Rain or Shine)
  - Calvin Abueva (Alaska)
- Most Improved Player: Terrence Romeo (GlobalPort)
- Sportsmanship Award: June Mar Fajardo (San Miguel)

=== Awards given by the PBA Press Corps ===
- Defensive Player of the Year: June Mar Fajardo (San Miguel)
- Scoring Champion: Terrence Romeo (GlobalPort)
- Baby Dalupan Coach of the Year: Leo Austria (San Miguel)
- Mr. Quality Minutes: Calvin Abueva (Alaska)
- Bogs Adornado Comeback Player of the Year: Alex Cabagnot (San Miguel)
- Danny Floro Executive of the Year: Patrick Gregorio (Talk 'N Text)
- Order of Merit: Paul Lee (Rain or Shine)
- All-Rookie Team
  - Stanley Pringle (GlobalPort)
  - Chris Banchero (Alaska)
  - Jake Pascual (Barako Bull)
  - Matt Ganuelas-Rosser (Talk 'N Text)
  - Jericho Cruz (Rain or Shine)

== Cumulative standings ==
Pos	Team	Pld	W	L	PCT	Best finish
1	San Miguel Beermen	54	37	17	.685	Champions
2	Rain or Shine Elasto Painters	55	35	20	.636	Finalist
3	TNT Tropang Texters/Tropang TNT/TNT KaTropa	51	31	20	.608	Finalist
4	Alaska Aces	58	34	24	.586	Champions
5	Purefoods/Star Hotshots	45	25	20	.556	Semifinalist
6	Meralco Bolts	42	21	21	.500	Semifinalist
7	Barangay Ginebra San Miguel	37	17	20	.459	Quarterfinalist
8	GlobalPort Batang Pier	36	16	20	.444	Quarterfinalist
9	Barako Bull Energy	36	15	21	.417	Quarterfinalist
10	NLEX Road Warriors	36	13	23	.361	Quarterfinalist
11	Kia Sorento/Carnival	33	10	23	.303	Elimination round
12	Blackwater Elite	33	4	29	.121	Elimination round

=== Elimination rounds ===
Pos	Team	Pld	W	L	PCT
1	Rain or Shine Elasto Painters	33	24	9	.727
2	TNT Tropang Texters/Tropang TNT/TNT KaTropa	33	21	12	.636 (Note: Elimination round quotient: Talk 'N Text 1.047, Alaska 1.015, San Miguel 0.937)
3	Alaska Aces	33	21	12	.636
4	San Miguel Beermen	33	21	12	.636
5	Purefoods/Star Hotshots	33	20	13	.606
6	Meralco Bolts	33	17	16	.515
7	GlobalPort Batang Pier	33	16	17	.485 (Note: Elimination round head-to-head record: GlobalPort 2–1 Barangay Ginebra)
8	Barangay Ginebra San Miguel	33	16	17	.485
9	Barako Bull Energy	33	15	18	.455
10	NLEX Road Warriors	33	13	20	.394
11	Kia Sorento/Carnival	33	10	23	.303
12	Blackwater Elite	33	4	29	.121

=== Playoffs ===
Pos	Team	Pld	W	L
1	San Miguel Beermen	21	16	5
2	Alaska Aces	25	13	12
3	Rain or Shine Elasto Painters	22	11	11
4	TNT Tropang Texters/Tropang TNT/TNT KaTropa	18	10	8
5	Purefoods/Star Hotshots	12	5	7
6	Meralco Bolts	9	4	5
7	Barangay Ginebra San Miguel	4	1	3
8	NLEX Road Warriors	3	0	3
9	Barako Bull Energy	3	0	3
10	GlobalPort Batang Pier	3	0	3
11	Blackwater Elite	0	0	0
12	Kia Sorento/Carnival	0	0	0
