= 2014–15 Meralco Bolts season =

- Head coach: Norman Black
- General manager: Paolo Trillo
- Owners: Manila Electric Company (an MVP Group subsidiary)

Philippine Cup results
- Record: 6–5 (54.5%)
- Place: 6th
- Playoff finish: Quarterfinalist(lost to Alaska in the 2nd round)

Commissioner's Cup results
- Record: 6–5 (54.5%)
- Place: 5th
- Playoff finish: Semifinalist (lost to Rain or Shine, 0–3)

Governors' Cup results
- Record: 5–6 (45.5%)
- Place: 7th
- Playoff finish: Quarterfinalist (lost to San Miguel in two games with twice-to-win disadvantage

Meralco Bolts seasons

The 2014–15 Meralco Bolts season was the 5th season of the franchise in the Philippine Basketball Association (PBA).

== Key dates ==
- July 9: Talk 'N Text Tropang Texters head coach Norman Black was moved to the Meralco Bolts, replacing Ryan Gregorio as head coach.
- July 26: Former Alaska Aces coach Luigi Trillo was hired as assistant coach of the team.
- August 24: The 2014 PBA Draft will take place in Midtown Atrium, Robinson Place Manila.

== Draft picks ==
Round	Pick	Player	Position	Nationality	PBA D-League team	College
no draft picks

== Roster ==
2014–15 Meralco Bolts roster
Players
Coaches

Pos.	#	POB	Name	Height	Weight	DOB (YYYY–MM–DD)	From
G	1	(Philippines)	Simon Atkins	5 ft 11 in (1.80 m)	185 lb (84 kg)	1988-07-19	De La Salle
G	5	(Philippines)	Jai Reyes (IN)	5 ft 7 in (1.70 m)	150 lb (68 kg)	1987-02-25	Ateneo
F	7	(United States)	Cliff Hodge	6 ft 4 in (1.93 m)	195 lb (88 kg)	1988-02-03	Reedley
F	9	(Canada)	Sean Anthony	6 ft 4 in (1.93 m)	200 lb (91 kg)	1986-01-26	McGill
F/C	10	(Philippines)	Danny Ildefonso	6 ft 6 in (1.98 m)	230 lb (104 kg)	1976-12-08	National-U
G	11	(United States)	Mike Cortez	6 ft 0 in (1.83 m)	175 lb (79 kg)	1980-11-10	De La Salle
G/F	13	(Philippines)	Ryan Buenafe	6 ft 2 in (1.88 m)	225 lb (102 kg)	1990-02-01	Ateneo
F	15	(Philippines)	James Sena	6 ft 5 in (1.96 m)	226 lb (103 kg)	1988-08-31	José Rizal
G	17	(Philippines)	Anjo Caram	5 ft 7 in (1.70 m)	159 lb (72 kg)	1991-01-14	San Beda
F	20	(United States)	Jared Dillinger (C)	6 ft 4 in (1.93 m)	220 lb (100 kg)	1984-01-06	Hawaiʻi
F	21	(Philippines)	Reynel Hugnatan	6 ft 4 in (1.93 m)	210 lb (95 kg)	1978-11-03	Manila
F	22	(Philippines)	John Ferriols	6 ft 4 in (1.93 m)	205 lb (93 kg)	1974-09-09	USJ–R
F/C	23	(United States)	Kelly Nabong	6 ft 6 in (1.98 m)	230 lb (104 kg)	1988-11-17	SRJC
F	24	(Philippines)	Rey Guevarra	6 ft 3 in (1.91 m)	190 lb (86 kg)	1986-11-24	Letran
G	28	(Philippines)	Gary David	6 ft 2 in (1.88 m)	180 lb (82 kg)	1978-07-13	Lyceum
G/F	80	(Philippines)	Mark Macapagal (IN)	6 ft 2 in (1.88 m)	185 lb (84 kg)	1979-09-20	San Sebastian

Head coach

- (United States) Norman Black (Saint Joseph's)

Assistant coach(es)

- (Philippines) Ronnie Magsanoc (UP Diliman)
- (Philippines) Luigi Trillo (De La Salle)
- (Philippines) Patrick Fran (UST)
- (Philippines) Xavier Nunag (UP Diliman)
- (Philippines) Gene Afable (Ateneo)

Team manager

- (Philippines) Paolo Trillo (Ateneo)

Legend

- (C) Team captain
- (CI) Commissioner's Cup Import
- (GI) Governors' Cup Import
- (EI) EASL Import
- (DP) Unsigned draft pick
- (FA) Free agent
- (IN) Inactive
- (S) Suspended
- (R) Rookie
- Injured

Roster

== Philippine Cup ==
=== Eliminations ===
==== Standings ====
Pos	Team	W	L	PCT	GB	Qualification
1	San Miguel Beermen	9	2	.818 (Note: Head-to-head record: San Miguel 1–0 Rain or Shine)	—	Advance to semifinals
2	Rain or Shine Elasto Painters	9	2	.818	—	Advance to semifinals
3	Alaska Aces	8	3	.727 (Note: Head-to-head record: Alaska 1–0 Talk 'N Text)	1	Twice-to-beat in the quarterfinals
4	Talk 'N Text Tropang Texters	8	3	.727	1	Twice-to-beat in the quarterfinals
5	Barangay Ginebra San Miguel	6	5	.545 (Note: Head-to-head quotient: Barangay Ginebra 1.07, Meralco 1.06, Purefoods Star 0.89)	3	Twice-to-beat in the quarterfinals
6	Meralco Bolts	6	5	.545	3	Twice-to-beat in the quarterfinals
7	Purefoods Star Hotshots	6	5	.545	3	Twice-to-win in the quarterfinals
8	GlobalPort Batang Pier	5	6	.455	4	Twice-to-win in the quarterfinals
9	Barako Bull Energy	4	7	.364 (Note: Head-to-head record: Barako Bull 1–0 NLEX)	5	Twice-to-win in the quarterfinals
10	NLEX Road Warriors	4	7	.364	5	Twice-to-win in the quarterfinals
11	Kia Sorento	1	10	.091	8	
12	Blackwater Elite	0	11	.000	9	

Source: PBA.ph

=== Playoffs ===
==== Bracket ====
Quarterfinals (1st phase) (Higher seeds twice-to-beat)
3	Alaska	82
10	NLEX	78
6	Meralco	77
7	Purefoods Star	65
4	Talk 'N Text	105
9	Barako Bull	76
5	Barangay Ginebra	95
8	GlobalPort	78

Quarterfinals (2nd phase) (Single elimination)
3	Alaska	87
6	Meralco	69
4	Talk N Text	83
5	Barangay Ginebra	67

Semifinals (Best-of-7)
2	Rain or Shine	2
3	Alaska	4
1	San Miguel	4
4	Talk N' Text	0

Finals (Best-of-7)
3	Alaska	3
1	San Miguel	4

== Commissioner's Cup ==
=== Eliminations ===
==== Standings ====
Pos	Team	W	L	PCT	GB	Qualification
1	Rain or Shine Elasto Painters	8	3	.727 (Note: Head-to-head quotient: Rain or Shine 1.025, Talk 'N Text 1.010, Purefoods 0.969)	—	Twice-to-beat in the quarterfinals
2	Talk 'N Text Tropang Texters	8	3	.727	—	Twice-to-beat in the quarterfinals
3	Purefoods Star Hotshots	8	3	.727	—	Best-of-three quarterfinals
4	NLEX Road Warriors	6	5	.545 (Note: Head-to-head record: NLEX 1–0 Meralco)	2	Best-of-three quarterfinals
5	Meralco Bolts	6	5	.545	2	Best-of-three quarterfinals
6	Alaska Aces	5	6	.455 (Note: Head-to-head quotient: Alaska 1.021, Barako Bull 1.019, Barangay Ginebra 0.960)	3	Best-of-three quarterfinals
7	Barako Bull Energy	5	6	.455	3	Twice-to-win in the quarterfinals
8	Barangay Ginebra San Miguel	5	6	.455	3	Twice-to-win in the quarterfinals
9	San Miguel Beermen	4	7	.364 (Note: Head-to-head quotient: San Miguel 1.011, GlobalPort 0.995, Kia 0.994)	4	
10	GlobalPort Batang Pier	4	7	.364	4	
11	Kia Carnival	4	7	.364	4	
12	Blackwater Elite	3	8	.273	5	

Source: PBA.ph

=== Playoffs ===
==== Bracket ====
Quarterfinals
(#1 twice-to-beat)
1	Rain or Shine	92
8	Barangay Ginebra	91
(Best-of-3)
4	NLEX	0
5	Meralco	2
(#2 twice-to-beat)
2	Talk 'N Text	127
7	Barako Bull	97
(Best-of-3)
3	Purefoods Star	2
6	Alaska	0

Semifinals (Best-of-5)
1	Rain or Shine	3
5	Meralco	0
2	Talk 'N Text	3
3	Purefoods Star	1

Finals (Best-of-7)
1	Rain or Shine	3
2	Talk 'N Text	4

== Transactions ==
=== Trades ===
==== Pre-season ====
September 12, 2014	To Blackwater Sunday Salvacion; Jason Ballesteros (from Meralco)	To Meralco Sean Anthony (from NLEX via Blackwater)	To NLEX Juneric Baloria; 2016 & 2017 2nd round draft picks (from Blackwater)

=== Recruited imports ===
Tournament	Name	Debuted	Last game	Record
Commissioner's Cup	Josh Davis	January 27 (vs Barangay Ginebra)	April 5 (vs Rain or Shine)	8–7
Commissioner's Cup	No Import		April 7 (vs Rain or Shine)	0–1
Governors' Cup	Andre Emmett	May 5 (vs GlobalPort)	June 29 (vs San Miguel)	6–7
Governors' Cup	(Japan) Seiya Ando*	May 13 (vs NLEX)	June 29 (vs San Miguel)	5–6

(* Asian import)
