= List of Meralco Bolts seasons =

The Meralco Bolts joined the Philippine Basketball Association (PBA) in 2010 following the acquisition of the Sta. Lucia Realtors franchise of Sta. Lucia Realty and Development Corporation by the Manila Electric Company. The team began play in the 2010–11 PBA season.

== Records per conference ==
Conference champions	Conference runners-up	Conference semifinalists

Season	Conference	Team name	Elimination round						Playoffs	
Season	Conference	Team name	Finish	GP	W	L	PCT	GB	Stage	Results
2010-11	Philippine	Meralco Bolts	5th/10	14	7	7	.500	4	Quarterfinals	B-Meg Derby Ace 2, Meralco 0
2010-11	Commissioner's	Meralco Bolts	8th/10	9	3	6	.333	5	Did not qualify	
2010-11	Governors	Meralco Bolts	8th/9	8	3	5	.375	3	Did not qualify	
2011-12	Philippine	Meralco Bolts	6th/10	14	8	6	.571	2	Quarterfinals	Petron 2, Meralco 0
2011-12	Commissioner's	Meralco Bolts	6th/10	9	4	5	.444	3	6th-seed playoff Quarterfinals	Meralco 102, Powerade 98*; B-Meg 2, Meralco 1
2011-12	Governors	Meralco Bolts	6th/10	9	4	5	.444	4	6th-seed playoff Semifinals	Meralco 94, Powerade 86*; 6th overall (6–8), 2–3 in semifinals
2012-13	Philippine	Meralco Bolts	4th/10	14	8	6	.571	4	Quarterfinals	Alaska 2, Meralco 0
2012-13	Commissioner's	Meralco Bolts	5th/10	14	7	7	.500	4	Quarterfinals	San Mig Coffee 2, Meralco 1
2012-13	Governors'	Meralco Bolts	3rd/10	9	5	4	.556	3	Quarterfinals; Semifinals	Meralco** 86, Barako Bull 68; San Mig Coffee 3, Meralco 1
2013-14	Philippine	Meralco Bolts	9th/10	14	5	9	.357	6	8th-seed playoff	Alaska 94, Meralco 91*
2013-14	Commissioner's	Meralco Bolts	5th/10	9	5	4	.556	4	Quarterfinals	Rain or Shine 2, Meralco 1
2013-14	Governors'	Meralco Bolts	9th/10	9	3	6	.333	4	Did not qualify	
2014-15	Philippine	Meralco Bolts	6th/12	11	6	5	.545	3	Quarterfinals	1st phase: Meralco** 77, Purefoods 65; 2nd phase: Alaska 87, Meralco 69*
2014-15	Commissioner's	Meralco Bolts	5th/12	11	6	5	.545	2	Quarterfinals; Semifinals	Meralco 2, NLEX 0 Rain or Shine 3, Meralco 0
2014-15	Governors'	Meralco Bolts	7th/12	11	5	6	.455	3	Quarterfinals	San Miguel** def. Meralco in 2 games
2015-16	Philippine	Meralco Bolts	12th/12	11	1	10	.091	3	Did not qualify	
2015-16	Commissioner's	Meralco Bolts	2nd/12	11	8	3	.727	--	Quarterfinals; Semifinals	Meralco** 104, NLEX 97; Alaska 3, Meralco 2
2015-16	Governors'	Meralco Bolts	4th/12	11	6	5	.545	4	4th-seed playoff Quarterfinals; Semifinals; Finals	Meralco 104, Mahindra 99*; Meralco** 105, Mahindra 97; Meralco 3, TNT 1 Barangay Ginebra 4, Meralco 2
2016-17	Philippine	Meralco Bolts	11th/12	11	3	8	.273	7	Did not qualify	
2016-17	Commissioner's	Meralco Bolts	5th/12	11	7	4	.636	2	Quarterfinals	TNT 2, Meralco 1
2016-17	Governors'	Meralco Bolts	1st/12	11	9	2	.818	--	Quarterfinals; Semifinals; Finals	Meralco** def. Blackwater in 2 games Meralco 3, Star 0 Barangay Ginebra 4, Meralco 3
2017-18	Philippine	Meralco Bolts	11th/12	11	4	7	.364	4	Did not qualify	
2017-18	Commissioner's	Meralco Bolts	4th/12	11	7	4	.636	2	Quarterfinals	Barangay Ginebra 2, Meralco 0
2017-18	Governors'	Meralco Bolts	7th/12	11	5	6	.455	4	Quarterfinals; Semifinals	Meralco def. Phoenix** in 2 games Alaska 3, Meralco 1
2019	Philippine	Meralco Bolts	11th/12	11	3	8	.273	6	Did not qualify	
2019	Commissioner's	Meralco Bolts	9th/12	11	4	7	.364	6	8th-seed playoff	Alaska 88, Meralco 80*
2019	Governors'	Meralco Bolts	2nd/12	11	8	3	.727	--	Quarterfinals; Semifinals; Finals	Meralco** 94, Alaska 84; Meralco 3, TNT 2 Barangay Ginebra 4, Meralco 1
2020	Philippine	Meralco Bolts	5th/12	11	7	4	.636	1	Quarterfinals; Semifinals	Meralco def. San Miguel** in 2 games Barangay Ginebra 3, Meralco 2
2021	Philippine	Meralco Bolts	2nd/12	11	9	2	.818	1	Quarterfinals; Semifinals	Meralco** def. NLEX in 2 games Magnolia 4, Meralco 2
2021	Governors'	Meralco Bolts	4th/12	11	7	4	.636	2	Quarterfinals; Semifinals; Finals	Meralco** 100, San Miguel 85; Meralco 3, Magnolia 2 Barangay Ginebra 4, Meralco 2
2022–23	Philippine	Meralco Bolts	5th/12	11	7	4	.636	2	Quarterfinals; Semifinals	Meralco 2, Barangay Ginebra 1 San Miguel 4, Meralco 3
2022–23	Commissioner's	Meralco Bolts	10th/13	12	4	8	.364	6	Did not qualify	
2022–23	Governors'	Meralco Bolts	4th/12	11	7	4	.636	3	Quarterfinals; Semifinals	Meralco** 113, Magnolia 107 (OT); TNT 3, Meralco 1
2023–24	Commissioner's	Meralco Bolts	5th/12	13	8	3	.727	1	Quarterfinals	Phoenix Super LPG** def. Meralco in 2 games
2023–24	Philippine	Meralco Bolts	3rd/12	11	6	5	.545	4	Quarterfinals; Semifinals; Finals	Meralco 2, NLEX 0 Meralco 4, Barangay Ginebra 3 Meralco 4, San Miguel 2
2024–25	Governors'	Meralco Bolts	2nd in Group A	10	7	3	.700	1	Quarterfinals	Barangay Ginebra 3, Meralco 0
2024–25	Commissioner's	Meralco Bolts	5th/13	12	7	5	.583	2	Quarterfinals	Barangay Ginebra 2, Meralco 1
2024–25	Philippine	Meralco Bolts	8th/12	11	6	5	.545	2	Quarterfinals	San Miguel** 107, Meralco 97
Elimination round				419	219	200	.523	—	14 Semifinals appearances	
Playoffs				156	71	85	.455	—	5 Finals appearances	
Cumulative records				575	290	285	.504	—	1 championship	

*one-game playoffs
**team had the twice-to-beat advantage

== Records per season ==
PBA season	Team season	GP	W	L	PCT	Best finish
2010–11	2010–11	33	13	20	.394	Quarterfinalist
2011–12	2011–12	44	21	23	.477	Semifinalist
2012–13	2012–13	47	23	24	.489	Semifinalist
2013–14	2013–14	36	14	22	.389	Quarterfinalist
2014–15	2014–15	42	21	21	.500	Semifinalist
2015–16	2015–16	51	25	26	.490	Finalist
2016–17	2016–17	48	27	21	.563	Finalist
2017–18	2017–18	41	19	22	.463	Semifinalist
2019	2019	45	20	25	.444	Finalist
2020	2020	18	11	7	.611	Semifinalist
2021	2021	42	25	17	.595	Finalist
2022–23	2022–23	49	25	24	.510	Semifinalist
2023–24	2023–24	39	25	14	.641	Champions
2024–25	2024–25	40	21	19	.525	Quarterfinalist
Total		575	290	285	.504	1 Championship
