= 2015 PBA Governors' Cup finals =

Basketball tournament in the Philippines

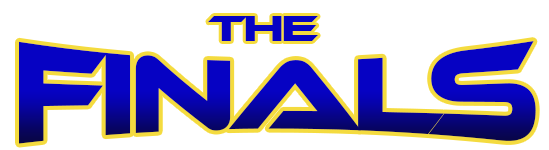
Team	Coach	Wins
(2) San Miguel Beermen	Leo Austria	4
(1) Alaska Aces	Alex Compton	0
- Dates: July 10–17, 2015
- MVP: June Mar Fajardo (San Miguel Beermen)
- Television: Local: Sports5; TV5; AksyonTV; Cignal PPV (HD); Fox Sports Asia; International: AksyonTV International
- Announcers: See broadcast notes
- Radio network: Radyo5

Referees
- Game 1: A. Herrera, P. Balao, J. Marabe
- Game 2: N. Quilingen, P. Balao, E. Tangkion
- Game 3: N. Quilingen, P. Balao, E. Tangkion
- Game 4: A. Herrera, E. Aquino, J. Mariano

PBA Governors' Cup finals chronology
- < 2014 2016 >

PBA finals chronology
- < 2015 Commissioner's 2015–16 Philippine >

The 2015 PBA Governors' Cup finals was the best-of-seven championship series of the 2015 PBA Governors' Cup, and the conclusion of the conference's playoffs. The Alaska Aces and the San Miguel Beermen competed for the 15th Governors' Cup championship and the 115th overall contested by the league. This also served as a finals rematch between the two teams, when San Miguel won the season's Philippine Cup championship in seven games.

The San Miguel Beermen swept Alaska in their best-of-seven series, four games to none, winning their 21st overall championship in the league.

== Background ==
=== Road to the finals ===
San Miguel		Alaska
Finished 8–3 (0.727)—Tied with Alaska at 1st place	Elimination round	Finished 8–3 (0.727)—Tied with San Miguel at 1st place
0.939 (2nd place)	Tiebreaker*	1.065 (1st place)
Def. Meralco in two games 99–106, 102–86 (twice-to-beat advantage)	Quarterfinals	Def. Barangay Ginebra in one game, 114–108 (twice-to-beat advantage)
Def. Rain or Shine, 3–1 (best-of-five)	Semifinals	Def. Star, 3–0 (best-of-five)

=== Head-to-head matchup ===
June 20
5:00 PM

Boxscore

Alaska Aces 82, San Miguel Beermen 77
Scoring by quarter: 23–10, 24–21, 18–28, 17–18
Pts: Travis 32; Rebs: Travis 10; Asts: Casio 4	Pts: Reid 17; Rebs: Fajardo, Reid 12; Asts: Reid 5

Panabo Multi-Purpose Tourism Cultural and Sports Center, Panabo City, Davao del Norte
Referees: A. Herrera, S. Pineda, R. Gruta

== Series summary ==
Team	Game 1	Game 2	Game 3	Game 4	Wins
San Miguel	108	103	96	91	4
Alaska	78	95	89	81	0
Venue	MOA	Araneta	Araneta	Araneta

=== Game 1 ===
July 10
7:00pm

boxscore

San Miguel Beermen 108, Alaska Aces 78
Scoring by quarter: 35–22, 19–19, 23–24, 31–13
Pts: Reid 32; Rebs: Fajardo 17; Asts: Reid 7	Pts: Travis 14; Rebs: Thoss 8 Asts: Travis 5
San Miguel leads series, 1–0

Mall of Asia Arena, Pasay
Referees: A. Herrera, P. Balao, J. Marabe

=== Game 2 ===
July 12
5:00pm

boxscore

San Miguel Beermen 103, Alaska Aces 95
Scoring by quarter: 28–24, 19–20, 26–29, 30–22
Pts: Reid 37; Rebs: Fajardo 14; Asts: Reid, Lutz 7	Pts: Travis 23; Rebs: Travis 11; Asts: Dela Rosa 4
San Miguel leads series, 2–0

Smart Araneta Coliseum, Quezon City
Referees: N. Quilingen, P. Balao, E. Tangkion

=== Game 3 ===
July 15
7:00pm

boxscore

San Miguel Beermen 96, Alaska Aces 89
Scoring by quarter: 25–21, 23–31, 28–25, 20–12
Pts: Reid 41; Rebs: Fajardo 19; Asts: Reid, Cabagnot, Fajardo, 3	Pts: Travis 17; Rebs: Travis 7 Asts: Travis, Casio, Thoss 3
San Miguel leads series, 3–0

Smart Araneta Coliseum, Quezon City
Referees: N. Quilingen, P. Balao, E. Tangkion

=== Game 4 ===
July 17
7:00pm

boxscore

San Miguel Beermen 91, Alaska Aces 81
Scoring by quarter: 18–17, 19–32, 33–16, 21–16
Pts: Reid 33; Rebs: Fajardo 21; Asts: Cabagnot 6	Pts: Abueva 22; Rebs: Abueva 16; Asts: Travis, Abueva, Banchero, Casio 3
San Miguel wins series, 4–0

Smart Araneta Coliseum, Quezon City
Attendance: 14,246
Referees: A. Herrera, E. Aquino, J. Mariano

== Rosters ==
San Miguel Beermen roster
Players
Coaches

Pos.	#	POB	Name	Height	Weight	DOB (YYYY–MM–DD)	From
G/F	3	(United States)	Chris Lutz	6 ft 4 in (1.93 m)	200 lb (91 kg)	1985-02-11	Marshall
F/C	4	(Philippines)	Jay-R Reyes	6 ft 7.5 in (2.02 m)	215 lb (98 kg)	1984-07-16	Philippines
G	5	(Philippines)	Alex Cabagnot	6 ft 0 in (1.83 m)	180 lb (82 kg)	1982-12-08	Hawaiʻi–Hilo
G	6	(United States)	Chris Ross	6 ft 3 in (1.91 m)	180 lb (82 kg)	1985-03-08	Marshall
G	11	(Philippines)	Jeric Fortuna	5 ft 9 in (1.75 m)	150 lb (68 kg)	1991-11-25	UST
G/F	13	(United States)	Marcio Lassiter	6 ft 4 in (1.93 m)	185 lb (84 kg)	1987-05-16	Cal State Fullerton
C	15	(Philippines)	June Mar Fajardo	6 ft 10 in (2.08 m)	270 lb (122 kg)	1989-11-17	Cebu
F	21	(Philippines)	Nelbert Omolon	6 ft 5 in (1.96 m)	185 lb (84 kg)	1980-06-30	Philippine Christian
F	23	(Philippines)	Ronald Pascual (R)	6 ft 3.5 in (1.92 m)	190 lb (86 kg)	1988-06-23	San Sebastian
F	27	(Philippines)	Gabby Espinas	6 ft 5 in (1.96 m)	200 lb (91 kg)	1982-01-03	Philippine Christian
F	29	(Philippines)	Arwind Santos (C)	6 ft 5 in (1.96 m)	175 lb (79 kg)	1981-06-10	Far Eastern
F	32	(United States)	Arizona Reid (I)	6 ft 4 in (1.93 m)	205 lb (93 kg)	1986-03-11	High Point
F	33	(Australia)	David Semerad (R)	6 ft 6 in (1.98 m)	230 lb (104 kg)	1991-04-25	San Beda
G/F	71	(Philippines)	Ronald Tubid	6 ft 1 in (1.85 m)	185 lb (84 kg)	1981-10-15	UE
C	95	(Philippines)	Yancy De Ocampo	6 ft 9 in (2.06 m)	235 lb (107 kg)	1980-03-11	Saint Francis of Assisi

Head coach

- (Philippines) Leo Austria (Lyceum)

Assistant coach(es)

- (Philippines) Peter Martin (San Sebastian)
- (Philippines) Biboy Ravanes (Cebu)
- (Philippines) Boyzie Zamar (UE)
- (Philippines) Dayong Mendoza
- (Philippines) Ato Agustin (Lyceum)
- (Philippines) Jorge Gallent (Far Eastern)

Team manager

- (Philippines) Gee Abanilla (De La Salle)

Legend

- (C) Team captain
- (CI) Commissioner's Cup Import
- (GI) Governors' Cup Import
- (EI) EASL Import
- (DP) Unsigned draft pick
- (FA) Free agent
- (IN) Inactive
- (S) Suspended
- (R) Rookie
- Injured

Alaska Aces roster
Players
Coaches

Pos.	#	POB	Name	Height	Weight	DOB (YYYY–MM–DD)	From
F	1	(United States)	Romeo Travis (I)	6 ft 5.5 in (1.97 m)	220 lb (100 kg)	1984-12-10	Akron
G	2	(United States)	Chris Banchero (R)	6 ft 0.25 in (1.84 m)	185 lb (84 kg)	1989-01-24	Seattle Pacific
G/F	3	(Philippines)	Cyrus Baguio	6 ft 2 in (1.88 m)	180 lb (82 kg)	1980-08-19	UST
F	4	(Philippines)	Manuel, Vic	6 ft 5 in (1.96 m)	200 lb (91 kg)	1987-06-18	PSBA
C	7	(Papua New Guinea)	Sonny Thoss	6 ft 8.5 in (2.04 m)	205 lb (93 kg)	1981-12-07	James Cook
F	8	(Philippines)	Calvin Abueva	6 ft 3 in (1.91 m)	190 lb (86 kg)	1988-02-04	San Sebastian
F/C	9	(Philippines)	Nonoy Baclao	6 ft 6 in (1.98 m)	210 lb (95 kg)	1987-06-15	Ateneo
G/F	11	(United States)	Rome dela Rosa (R)	6 ft 3 in (1.91 m)	180 lb (82 kg)	1990-12-11	San Beda
F	15	(United States)	Josh Vanlandingham (IN)	6 ft 5 in (1.96 m)	205 lb (93 kg)	1984-01-22	Everett CC
G	17	(Philippines)	Ping Exciminiano	6 ft 1 in (1.85 m)	185 lb (84 kg)	1988-11-17	Far Eastern
F/C	21	(Philippines)	Paolo Bugia (IN)	6 ft 5.75 in (1.97 m)	215 lb (98 kg)	1981-01-19	Ateneo
G/F	25	(Philippines)	Dondon Hontiveros	6 ft 2 in (1.88 m)	170 lb (77 kg)	1977-06-01	Cebu
C	26	(Philippines)	Samigue Eman	6 ft 10 in (2.08 m)	260 lb (118 kg)	1982-03-12	Mindanao
F/C	30	(United States)	Eric Menk	6 ft 6 in (1.98 m)	220 lb (100 kg)	1974-08-24	Lake Superior State
G	31	(Philippines)	RJ Jazul	5 ft 11 in (1.80 m)	170 lb (77 kg)	1986-04-11	Letran
F	35	(United States)	Tony dela Cruz (C)	6 ft 5 in (1.96 m)	178 lb (81 kg)	1978-08-24	UC Irvine
G	42	(Philippines)	JVee Casio	5 ft 11 in (1.80 m)	170 lb (77 kg)	1986-09-01	De La Salle

Head coach

- (Philippines) Alex Compton (Cornell)

Assistant coach(es)

- (Philippines) Louie Alas (Adamson)
- (United States) Jeffrey Cariaso (Sonoma State)
- (Philippines) Topex Robinson (San Sebastian)
- (Philippines) Monch Gavieres (Letran)
- (Philippines) Franco Atienza

Team manager

- (Philippines) Dickie Bachmann^{[a]} (De La Salle)

Legend

- (C) Team captain
- (CI) Commissioner's Cup Import
- (GI) Governors' Cup Import
- (EI) EASL Import
- (DP) Unsigned draft pick
- (FA) Free agent
- (IN) Inactive
- (S) Suspended
- (R) Rookie
- Injured

Roster

- ^{a} also serves as Alaska's board governor.

== Broadcast notes ==
Game	TV5 coverage			Fox Sports coverage	
Game	Play-by-play	Analyst(s)	Courtside reporters	Play-by-play	Analyst(s)
Game 1	Charlie Cuna	Ali Peek and Ryan Gregorio	Erika Padilla	no broadcast	
Game 2	Magoo Marjon	Quinito Henson and Dominic Uy	Rizza Diaz	Nicholas Nathanielsz	Charles Tiu
Game 3	Charlie Cuna	Andy Jao and Eric Reyes	Sel Guevara	Patricia Bermudez-Hizon	Vince Hizon
Game 4	Magoo Marjon	Dominic Uy and Richard del Rosario	Apple David	Jude Turcuato	Charles Tiu

- Additional Game 4 crew:
  - Trophy presentation: James Velasquez
  - Dugout interviewer: Apple David
