= Josh Vanlandingham =

Filipino-American basketball player

Personal information
- Born: January 22, 1984 (age 42) Snohomish, Washington, U.S.
- Listed height: 6 ft 4 in (1.93 m)
- Listed weight: 205 lb (93 kg)

Career information
- High school: Snohomish (Snohomish, Washington)
- College: Pacific Lutheran
- PBA draft: 2010: 1st round, 5th overall pick
- Drafted by: Rain or Shine Elasto Painters
- Playing career: 2010–2016
- Position: Small forward / shooting guard

Career history
- 2010–2011: Rain or Shine Elasto Painters
- 2011–2012: Powerade Tigers
- 2012–2013: GlobalPort Batang Pier
- 2014–2016: Alaska Aces

Joshua Thomas "Josh" Vanlandingham (born January 22, 1984) is an American-born Filipino-German former professional basketball player. He last played for the Alaska Aces of the Philippine Basketball Association (PBA). Born in Snohomish, Washington, he was drafted fifth overall in the 2010 PBA Draft.

== Professional career ==
=== Rain or Shine Elasto Painters ===
Vanlandingham was drafted fifth overall by Rain or Shine Elasto Painters in the 2010 PBA draft.

=== Powerade Tigers / GlobalPort Batang Pier ===
In 2011, he and Doug Kramer were traded to the Powerade Tigers in exchange for Norman Gonzales and J.R. Quiñahan.

=== Alaska Aces ===
On August 27, 2014, he was signed by the Alaska Aces.

== PBA career statistics ==
Legend
GP	Games played	MPG	Minutes per game
FG%	Field-goal percentage	3P%	3-point field-goal percentage	FT%	Free-throw percentage
RPG	Rebounds per game	APG	Assists per game	SPG	Steals per game
BPG	Blocks per game	PPG	Points per game	**Bold**	Career high

=== Season-by-season averages ===
Year	Team	GP	MPG	FG%	3P%	FT%	RPG	APG	SPG	BPG	PPG
2010–11	Rain or Shine	32	12.1	.383	.333	**.649**	1.6	.3	.1	.1	**5.0**
2011–12	Powerade	**48**	11.9	.361	.330	.643	**2.1**	**.7**	.2	**.2**	3.9
2012–13	GlobalPort	21	**14.1**	.375	.311	.500	1.9	.4	**.3**	.1	3.9
2014–15	Alaska	4	5.3	**.500**	**.500**	—	.3	.3	.0	.0	1.5
2015–16	Alaska	3	3.0	.000	.000	—	.7	.3	.0	.0	.0
Career		108	11.9	.371	.329	.638	1.8	.5	.2	.1	4.0
