= Chris Exciminiano =

Filipino basketball player

Personal information
- Born: November 17, 1988 (age 37) Olongapo, Philippines
- Listed height: 6 ft 0 in (1.83 m)
- Listed weight: 185 lb (84 kg)

Career information
- College: FEU
- PBA draft: 2013: 2nd round, 18th overall pick
- Drafted by: Alaska Aces
- Playing career: 2013–2025
- Position: Shooting guard

Career history
- 2013–2019: Alaska Aces
- 2019: Rain or Shine Elasto Painters
- 2021: KCS Computer Specialist–Mandaue
- 2021, 2024–2025: TNT Tropang Giga/5G

Career highlights
- 3× PBA champion (2021 Philippine, 2024 Governors', 2024–25 Commissioner's); 2× PBA All-Defensive Team (2015, 2016); Pilipinas VisMin Super Cup Visayas Leg champion (2021); Pilipinas VisMin Super Cup Finals MVP (2021)

Christopher "Ping" Exciminiano (born November 17, 1988) is a Filipino former professional basketball player. He played for three teams during his career in the Philippine Basketball Association (PBA).

== Early life ==
Exciminiano was born in Olongapo City to William Veins Green, a US Navy Serviceman who was once stationed in Subic, and Gina Exciminiano. His father abandoned them even before he was born. He has since not seen or met his dad until now but hopes to finally meeting him one day.

== College career ==
Exciminiano played collegiate basketball at FEU where he established himself as defensive stopper, while serving as backup to Terrence Romeo and RR Garcia. He also suited up for the Cagayan Rising Suns in the PBA Developmental League.

== Professional career ==
Exciminiano was selected 18th overall in the 2013 PBA draft by the Aces.

During his rookie season, he struggled to get some playing time as a third-string shooting guard to Cyrus Baguio and Dondon Hontiveros and was shuffled in an out of Alaska's active roster. However, in his sophomore season, he became one of coach Alex Compton's reliable energy guys off the bench as Alaska veered away from the triangle offense and adopted the fast-paced, full court-pressing system.

He was the unsung hero of the Aces' come-from-behind victory in the pivotal Game Five against Rain or Shine in their semi-final series, and would reprise the same role in another come-from-behind win in Game Three against San Miguel in the 2014–15 PBA Philippine Cup Finals.

In his third season, he continued to play significant minutes for the Aces, often assigned as the defensive stopper for the opposing scorers. He typified his role during the 2015–16 PBA Philippine Cup semifinals against GlobalPort when he was assigned to defend Terrence Romeo. His defensive stops were keys to winning the series.

On October 14, 2016, Exciminiano was recognized during the PBA Leo Awards Night as he was named to the PBA All-Defensive Team.

On August 16, 2019, Exciminiano, along with 2019 first-round pick, was traded to Rain or Shine Elasto Painters for Maverick Ahanmisi.

In February 2021, Exciminiano was signed by the TNT Tropang Giga to a one-year deal. A month later, with the blessing of TNT, he was signed up by the KCS Computer Specialist–Mandaue to play in the Visayas leg of the first season of the Pilipinas VisMin Super Cup.

On September 17, 2025, Exciminiano announced his retirement in his Instagram account.

== PBA career statistics ==
Legend
GP	Games played	MPG	Minutes per game	FG%	Field-goal percentage
3FG%	3-point field-goal percentage	4P%	4-point field-goal percentage	FT%	Free-throw percentage
RPG	Rebounds per game	APG	Assists per game	SPG	Steals per game
BPG	Blocks per game	PPG	Points per game	127	Career high

=== Season-by-season averages ===
Year	Team	GP	MPG	FG%	3P%	4P%	FT%	RPG	APG	SPG	BPG	PPG
2013–14	Alaska	11	9.6	.417	.368	—	.500	.6	.2	.6	.1	3.6
2014–15	Alaska	57	13.1	.521	.125	—	.488	1.3	.7	.8	.1	3.4
2015–16	Alaska	57	11.5	.433	.344	—	.621	1.7	1.0	.7	.0	3.5
2016–17	Alaska	33	16.5	.405	.264	—	.621	1.8	1.3	1.1	.2	4.6
2017–18	Alaska	50	14.8	.399	.241	—	.546	2.1	1.1	.8	.1	3.4
2019	Alaska	33	12.6	.345	.200	—	.500	2.0	.7	.8	.2	3.9
2019	Rain or Shine	33	12.6	.345	.200	—	.500	2.0	.7	.8	.2	3.9
2021	TNT	19	3.4	.350	.250	—	.500	.4	.2	.2	.1	1.0
2024–25	TNT	22	4.6	.235	.250	.375	.500	.1	.2	.1	—	1.3
Career		282	11.9	.414	.252	.375	.545	1.5	.8	.7	.1	3.3
