= Samigue Eman =

Filipino basketball player

Personal information
- Born: March 12, 1981 (age 45) Davao City, Philippines
- Listed height: 6 ft 9 in (2.06 m)
- Listed weight: 239 lb (108 kg)

Career information
- College: UMin
- PBA draft: 2007: 1st round, 2nd overall pick
- Drafted by: Magnolia Beverage Masters
- Playing career: 2007–2016
- Position: Center

Career history
- 2007–2010: San Miguel Beermen
- 2010–2016: Alaska Aces

Career highlights
- 3× PBA champion (2009 Fiesta, 2010 Fiesta, 2013 Commissioner's)

Samigue Eman (born March 12, 1981) is a Filipino former professional basketball player. He played for two teams during his career in the Philippine Basketball Association (PBA).

Eman was the 2nd overall draft pick of the Magnolia Beverage Masters in the 2007 PBA draft. In 2004, following his participation in the "Try-Outs ng Bayan" program, the University of Mindanao released Eman to join the Philippine National Men's team RP-Cebuana Lhuillier.

On his first two years and a conference with the San Miguel Beermen, he only played sporadically. But, after being acquired by the Aces during the 2010 PBA Fiesta Conference, he was able to showcase his skills as a rebounder and low-post defender and played more minutes. During the 2011–12 Philippine Cup and part of the Commissioner's Cup, he wore number 33, possibly given permission by Bogs Adornado.

== PBA career statistics ==
Legend
GP	Games played	MPG	Minutes per game
FG%	Field-goal percentage	3P%	3-point field-goal percentage	FT%	Free-throw percentage
RPG	Rebounds per game	APG	Assists per game	SPG	Steals per game
BPG	Blocks per game	PPG	Points per game	**Bold**	Career high

=== Season-by-season averages ===
Year	Team	GP	MPG	FG%	3P%	FT%	RPG	APG	SPG	BPG	PPG
2007–08	Magnolia	19	10.8	**.633**	—	**.688**	3.0	.2	.1	.7	**4.4**
2008–09	San Miguel	12	6.6	.500	—	.500	1.3	.0	.1	.7	1.1
2009–10	San Miguel	**42**	8.4	.508	—	.500	2.1	.2	.2	.4	2.1
2009–10	Alaska	**42**	8.4	.508	—	.500	2.1	.2	.2	.4	2.1
2010–11	Alaska	39	**12.1**	.405	—	.538	**3.8**	**.4**	.1	**.9**	3.3
2011–12	Alaska	35	9.3	.405	—	.500	2.9	.1	**.3**	.7	2.4
2012–13	Alaska	28	4.9	.433	—	.440	1.2	.2	.2	.3	1.3
2013–14	Alaska	20	5.9	.400	—	.455	1.6	.1	.1	.4	1.7
2014–15	Alaska	34	7.7	.314	—	.579	1.3	.2	.2	.5	1.3
2015–16	Alaska	17	5.2	.167	.000	.333	1.0	.1	**.3**	.5	.6
Career		246	8.3	.424	.000	.527	2.2	.2	.2	.6	2.1
