= Wayne Chism =

American basketball player (born 1987)

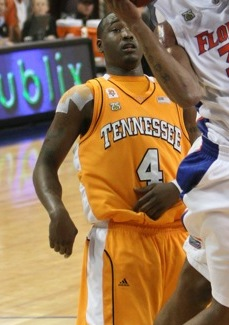

No. 2 – Al-Muharraq
- Position: Power forward / center
- League: Bahraini Premier League

Personal information
- Born: June 16, 1987 (age 39) Jackson, Tennessee, U.S.
- Listed height: 6 ft 9 in (2.06 m)
- Listed weight: 245 lb (111 kg)

Career information
- High school: Bolivar Central (Bolivar, Tennessee)
- College: Tennessee (2006–2010)
- NBA draft: 2010: undrafted
- Playing career: 2010–present

Career history
- 2010: Antalya Büyükşehir Belediyesi
- 2011: Fort Wayne Mad Ants
- 2011–2012: Alba Fehérvár
- 2012–2013: Aix Maurienne
- 2013–2014: Kaposvár
- 2014: Rain or Shine Elasto Painters
- 2014–2015: Hapoel Gilboa Galil
- 2015–2016: Rain or Shine Elasto Painters
- 2016–2017: Garzas de Plata Hidalgo
- 2017: NLEX Road Warriors
- 2017–2019: Manama
- 2018: Magnolia Hotshots
- 2019: Hekmeh BC
- 2019–2022: Al Wahda
- 2022–2023: Bahrain SC
- 2023–present: Al-Muharraq

Career highlights
- Bahrain League champion (2018); All-Bahrain League First Team (2018); PBA Best Import of the Conference (2015 Commissioner's); Hungarian League Import Player of the Year (2014); First-team All-SEC (2010); SEC Freshman of the Year (2007)

Devon Dwayne Lamont "Wayne" Chism (born June 16, 1987) is an American-Bahraini professional basketball player for Al-Muharraq of the Bahraini Premier League. He played college basketball for the Tennessee Volunteers.

== Career ==
Born in Jackson, Tennessee, Chism was the focus of the Volunteers' offense during his senior season. He averaged 12.6 ppg, 7.2 rpg, and 1.3 bpg, all team highs. He also led UT to its first Elite Eight appearance in school history, where they were defeated by the Michigan State Spartans by a final score of 70–69.

Chism was not selected in the 2010 NBA draft, but received summer league invitations from the New Jersey Nets and Sacramento Kings.

He played for Antalya BB in Turkey, but was released in December 2010. In January 2011, he signed to play with the Fort Wayne Mad Ants of the NBA D-League.

For the 2011–12 season, he signed with Albacomp of Hungary.

In July 2012, he signed with Aix Maurienne Savoie Basket of the French LNB Pro B for the 2012–13 season.

In October 2013, he returned to Hungary and signed with Kaposvári KK. In February 2014, he parted ways with Kaposvári.

In August 2014, he signed a one-year deal with Hapoel Gilboa Galil. On January 20, 2015, he was waived by the Israeli club.

In March 2014, Chism signed with the Rain or Shine Elasto Painters of the Philippine Basketball Association as the team's import for the 2014 PBA Commissioner's Cup.

In February 2015, he returned to Philippines for his second tour of duty as import for Rain or Shine Elasto Painters Chism led the Elasto Painters to a league-leading 8–3 win–loss record (a record they tied with Talk 'N Text) and to a finals stint before losing to Talk 'N Text in seven games. For his contributions to the team, Chism was awarded the Best Import of the Conference award at the end of the conference.

In November 2015, Chism signed to play and return to the Philippines for the third time, again playing for Rain or Shine as the team's import for the 2016 PBA Commissioner's Cup. However, on February 18, 2016, in a game against Meralco Bolts, he injured his hamstring, and was doubtful to play for the rest of the conference. Two days later, he was released by the team and was replaced by NBA veteran Antonie Wright.

In October 2016, Chism signed with Garzas de Plata Hidalgo of the Mexican LNBP.

In August 2017, Chism signed with Manama of the Bahraini Premier League.
