= Biboy Ravanes =

Filipino basketball player and coach

San Miguel Beermen
- Position: Assistant coach
- League: PBA

Personal information
- Born: 1959 (age 66–67) Cebu City
- Listed height: 6 ft 1 in (1.85 m)
- Listed weight: 185 lb (84 kg)

Career information
- College: University of Cebu
- Playing career: 1979–1998

Career history

Playing
- 1980–1985: Magnolia
- 1986–1987: Shell Oilers
- 1988–1991: Alaska Milkmen
- 1992–1994: San Miguel Beermen

Coaching
- 1998–1999: SocSarGen Marlins
- 2000–2001: Pop Cola Panthers (assistant)
- 2003–2004: Coca Cola Tigers (assistant)
- 2006–2014: Petron Blaze Boosters (assistant)
- 2014: San Miguel Beermen
- 2014–present: San Miguel Beermen (assistant)

Career highlights
- As player: 5× PBA champion (1982 Invitational, 1991 Third, 1992 All-Filipino, 1993 Governors', 1994 All-Filipino); 3× PBA All-Defensive Team (1987, 1988, 1991); As assistant coach: 16× PBA champion (2002 All-Filipino, 2003 Reinforced, 2009 Fiesta, 2011 Governors', 2014–15 Philippine, 2015 Governors', 2015–16 Philippine, 2016–17 Philippine, 2017 Commissioner's, 2017–18 Philippine, 2019 Philippine, 2019 Commissioner's, 2022 Philippine, 2023–24 Commissioner's, 2025 Philippine, 2025–26 Philippine)

Melchor "Biboy" Ravanes (born 1959) is a former Filipino professional basketball player and former head coach of the San Miguel Beermen in the Philippine Basketball Association (PBA). Prior to this, he was SMB's longtime assistant coach.

== Player profile ==
Ravanes was part of a wave of Cebuano cagers recruited by the squad, then known as San Miguel Braves in the MICAA. He was also a member of the franchise's first championship in 1979. Apart from the Beermen, he also saw action for Shell and Alaska in his career that spanned 16 seasons. A tenacious defender, he was named to the league's All-Defensive Team three times.

== Coaching career ==
Ravanes became an assistant coach for the Pop Cola Panthers under Chot Reyes in 2000, specifically for player relations. But when the Panthers sold to Coca-Cola and became Coca-Cola Tigers, he was retained on its inaugural season, until 2006, when national team head coach Chot Reyes, assistant coaches Nash Racela, and Aboy Castro joined San Miguel Beermen. He stayed on the Beermen even Reyes, Racela and Castro left for Talk 'N Text.

Ravanes become head coach of San Miguel Beermen, replacing Gee Abanilla, with Todd Purves as active consultant. After two conferences of winning standings but losing on playoffs, Ravanes and Purves was demoted and replaced by Leo Austria.

== Coaching record ==
=== PBA ===
Season	Team	Conference	GP	W	L	PCT	Finish	PG	W	L	PCT	Results
2013–14	San Miguel	Commissioner's Cup	9	7	2	.778	2nd	2	0	2	.000	Lost in the quarterfinals with twice to beat advantage
2013–14	San Miguel	Governors' Cup	9	5	4	.556	5th	1	0	1	.000	Lost in the quarterfinals without twice to beat advantage
Career Total			18	12	6	.666	Playoff Total	3	0	3	.000	0 championship
