= Chris Lutz =

Filipino-American basketball player

Personal information
- Born: February 11, 1985 (age 41) Illinois, United States
- Listed height: 6 ft 3 in (1.91 m)
- Listed weight: 200 lb (91 kg)

Career information
- High school: Trinity (Manchester, New Hampshire); Brewster Academy (Wolfeboro, New Hampshire)
- College: Purdue (2005–2007); Marshall (2008–2010)
- PBA draft: 2011: 1st round, 3rd overall pick
- Drafted by: Barako Bull Energy
- Playing career: 2011–2016
- Position: Shooting guard / small forward

Career history
- 2011–2016: Petron Blaze Boosters / San Miguel Beermen

Career highlights
- 3× PBA champion (2014–15 Philippine, 2015 Governors', 2015–16 Philippine); PBA All-Star (2012)

Christopher Ryan Lutz (born February 11, 1985) is a Filipino-American former professional basketball player. He last played for the San Miguel Beermen of the Philippine Basketball Association (PBA). Lutz grew up in Bedford, New Hampshire.

As a senior in Trinity High School in Manchester, New Hampshire, he averaged 20 points, 5 rebounds and 5 assists per game and was a 3-time member of the first team All-State Selection. To date, he is Trinity's all-time leading scorer with over 1,600 points.

After graduation from Trinity, Chris attended Brewster Academy in Wolfeboro, New Hampshire, as a postgraduate. At Brewster, Chris averaged 15.5 points per game and emerged as a top-level NCAA D1 recruit. He was an All-New England Prep School selection honoree. He signed a letter-of-intent with Purdue University in November 2004 after receiving interest from Columbia and Vanderbilt.

Playing the guard spot, Chris made it to the Big 10-All Freshmen Team in Purdue University. He then transferred and played for the Marshall University's Thundering Herd where he eventually became team captain.

He would later join the Philippine National Team, Smart Gilas and then the 2011 PBA Draft where he became the 3rd Overall Pick.

== PBA career ==
Lutz filed his application for the 2011 PBA draft in July 2011. And, on August 18, 2011, he was picked 3rd Overall by the Petron Blaze Boosters with whom he signed a 1-year contract in September of the same year.

His PBA debut on October 5, 2011, was quite impressive for a rookie. In the game versus B-Meg Llamados, which they won, Lutz chalked in 19 points, 6 rebounds, 3 assists, and 1 block.

The Meralco Bolts picked Lutz from the free agent pool and signed him in 2017. He never played for the team due to injuries.

== PBA career statistics ==
Legend
GP	Games played	MPG	Minutes per game
FG%	Field-goal percentage	3P%	3-point field-goal percentage	FT%	Free-throw percentage
RPG	Rebounds per game	APG	Assists per game	SPG	Steals per game
BPG	Blocks per game	PPG	Points per game	**Bold**	Career high

Correct as of October 1, 2016

=== Season-by-season averages ===
Year	Team	GP	MPG	FG%	3P%	FT%	RPG	APG	SPG	BPG	PPG
2011–12	Petron	32	**35.5**	.422	.302	.809	**3.4**	**3.5**	**1.1**	**.3**	**15.4**
2012–13	Petron	43	26.1	.395	.326	.783	3.1	**3.5**	.6	.1	8.4
2013–14	Petron / San Miguel	41	26.8	.359	.250	.738	3.0	3.1	.5	.1	8.6
2014–15	San Miguel	**54**	26.2	.405	.275	**.817**	2.8	2.4	.7	.1	7.6
2015–16	San Miguel	34	16.2	**.491**	**.333**	.467	1.5	1.3	.2	.0	3.6
Career		204	26.1	.405	.288	.776	2.8	2.8	.6	.1	8.5
