= 2015 PBA Commissioner's Cup finals =

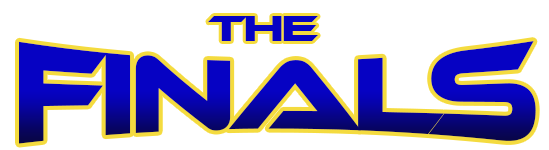
Team	Coach	Wins
(2) Talk 'N Text Tropang Texters	Jong Uichico	4
(1) Rain or Shine Elasto Painters	Yeng Guiao	3
- Dates: April 15–29, 2015
- MVP: Ranidel de Ocampo (Talk 'N Text Tropang Texters)
- Television: Local: Sports5; TV5; AksyonTV; Cignal PPV (HD); Fox Sports Asia; International: AksyonTV International
- Announcers: See broadcast notes
- Radio network: DWFM

Referees
- Game 1: P. Balao, N. Guevara, E. Tangkion
- Game 2: J. Mariano, N. Guevara, J. Marabe
- Game 3: A. Herrera, J. Mariano, J. Marabe
- Game 4: N. Quilingen, P. Balao, E. Tangkion
- Game 5: J. Mariano, P. Balao, J. Marabe
- Game 6: N. Guevara, A. Hererra, J. Marabe
- Game 7: A. Herrera, N. Guevara, E. Tankion

PBA Commissioner's Cup finals chronology
- < 2014 2016 >

PBA finals chronology
- < 2014–15 Philippine 2015 Governors' >

The 2015 Philippine Basketball Association (PBA) Commissioner's Cup finals was the best-of-seven championship series of the 2015 PBA Commissioner's Cup, and the conclusion of the conference's playoffs. Rain or Shine and Talk 'N Text competed for the 15th Commissioner's Cup championship and the 114th overall championship contested by the league.

== Background ==
=== Road to the finals ===
Talk 'N Text		Rain or Shine
Finished 8–3 (0.727)—Tied with Purefoods and Rain or Shine at 1st place	Elimination round	Finished 8–3 (0.727)—Tied with Purefoods and Talk 'N Text at 1st place
1.010 (2nd place)	Tiebreaker*	1.025 (1st place)
Def. Barako Bull, 127–97 (twice-to-beat advantage)	Quarterfinals	Def. Barangay Ginebra, 92–91 (twice-to-beat advantage)
Def. Purefoods Star, 3–1 (best-of-five)	Semifinals	Def. Meralco, 3–0 (best-of-five)

=== Head-to-head matchup ===
January 28

Talk 'N Text Tropang Texters 89, Rain or Shine Elasto Painters 86

Cuneta Astrodome, Pasay

== Series summary ==
Team	Game 1	Game 2	Game 3	Game 4	Game 5	Game 6	Game 7**	Wins
Talk 'N Text	99	108	97	99	103	93	121	4
Rain or Shine	92	116	109	92	94	101	119	3
Venue	MOA	Araneta	Araneta	Araneta	Araneta	Araneta	Araneta

*number of overtimes

=== Game 1 ===
April 15
7:00pm

boxscore

Talk 'N Text Tropang Texters 99, Rain or Shine Elasto Painters 92
Scoring by quarter: 28–23, 21–18, 27–29, 23–22
Pts: de Ocampo 24; Rebs: Johnson 12; Asts: Castro, Johnson 5	Pts: Chism 34; Rebs: Chism 15; Asts: Belga 5
Talk 'N Text leads series, 1–0

Mall of Asia Arena, Pasay
Referees: P. Balao, N. Guevarra, E. Tangkion

=== Game 2 ===
April 17
7:00pm

boxscore

Talk 'N Text Tropang Texters 108, Rain or Shine Elasto Painters 116
Scoring by quarter: 26–27, 36–22, 22–36, 24–31
Pts: Castro 44; Rebs: Johnson 12; Asts: de Ocampo 5	Pts: Chism 30; Rebs: Chism 13; Asts: Lee 4
Series tied, 1–1

Smart Araneta Coliseum, Quezon City
Referees: J. Mariano, N. Guevara, J. Marabe

=== Game 3 ===
April 19
5:00pm

boxscore

Talk 'N Text Tropang Texters 97, Rain or Shine Elasto Painters 109
Scoring by quarter: 26–32, 19–20, 20–32, 32–25
Pts: Johnson 30; Rebs: Johnson 14; Asts: Castro 4	Pts: Chism 32; Rebs: Chism 15; Asts: Lee, Norwood, Tiu 5
Rain or Shine leads series, 2–1

Smart Araneta Coliseum, Quezon City
Referees: A. Herrera, J. Mariano, J. Marabe

=== Game 4 ===
April 22
7:00pm

boxscore

Talk 'N Text Tropang Texters 99, Rain or Shine Elasto Painters 92
Scoring by quarter: 17–16, 25–25, 32–25, 25–26
Pts: de Ocampo 33; Rebs: Johnson 10; Asts: Castro 6	Pts: Tiu 21; Rebs: Almazan 10; Asts: Uyloan 4
Series tied, 2–2

Smart Araneta Coliseum, Quezon City
Referees: N. Quilingen, P. Balao, E. Tangkion

=== Game 5 ===
April 24
7:00pm

boxscore

Talk 'N Text Tropang Texters 103, Rain or Shine Elasto Painters 94
Scoring by quarter: 27–29, 29–13, 22–22, 25–30
Pts: de Ocampo, Johnson 27; Rebs: de Ocampo 8 Asts: Castro 9	Pts: Chism 25; Rebs: Chism 17; Asts: Tiu 6
Talk 'N Text leads series, 3–2

Smart Araneta Coliseum, Quezon City
Referees: J. Mariano, P. Balao, J. Marabe

=== Game 6 ===
April 26
5:00pm

boxscore

Talk 'N Text Tropang Texters 93, Rain or Shine Elasto Painters 101
Scoring by quarter: 18–23, 24–31, 29–22, 22–25
Pts: de Ocampo 21; Rebs: Washington 11; Asts: Castro 8	Pts: Chism, Almazan 18; Rebs: Chism 24; Asts: Lee 5
Series tied, 3–3

Smart Araneta Coliseum, Quezon City
Referees: N. Guevara, A. Hererra, J. Marabe

=== Game 7 ===
April 29
7:00pm

boxscore

Talk 'N Text Tropang Texters 121, Rain or Shine Elasto Painters 119 (2OT)
Scoring by quarter: 29–21, 21–21, 26–27, 21–28, Overtime: 9–9, 15–13
Pts: de Ocampo 34; Rebs: Johnson 11; Asts: Castro 12	Pts: Lee 38; Rebs: Chism 29; Asts: Norwood, Tiu 4
Talk 'N Text wins series, 4–3

Smart Araneta Coliseum, Quezon City
Referees: A. Herrera, N. Guevara, E. Tankion

== Rosters ==
Talk 'N Text Tropang Texters roster
Players
Coaches

Pos.	#	POB	Name	Height	Weight	DOB (YYYY–MM–DD)	From
C	2	(Philippines)	Jay Washington	6 ft 6 in (1.98 m)	210 lb (95 kg)	1981-11-10	Eckerd
PF	4	(United States)	Harvey Carey	6 ft 3 in (1.91 m)	210 lb (95 kg)	1979-03-18	Sonoma State
G	6	(Philippines)	Kevin Alas (R)	6 ft 2 in (1.88 m)	175 lb (79 kg)	1991-11-13	Letran
PG	9	(Philippines)	Robert Labagala	5 ft 6 in (1.68 m)	170 lb (77 kg)	1984-07-05	UE
SG	10	(Philippines)	Ryan Jay Reyes (injured) (IN)	6 ft 2 in (1.88 m)	190 lb (86 kg)	1983-08-10	Cal State Fullerton
C/G	11	(Philippines)	Willie Miller	5 ft 11 in (1.80 m)	200 lb (91 kg)	1977-07-13	Letran
G/F	12	(Philippines)	Larry Fonacier	6 ft 2 in (1.88 m)	170 lb (77 kg)	1982-05-13	Ateneo
PG	17	(Philippines)	Jayson Castro William	5 ft 11 in (1.80 m)	167 lb (76 kg)	1986-06-30	Philippine Christian
PF	21	(United States)	Kelly Williams	6 ft 7 in (2.01 m)	215 lb (98 kg)	1982-02-07	Oakland
G/F	22	(Philippines)	Matt Ganuelas-Rosser (R)	6 ft 5 in (1.96 m)	190 lb (86 kg)	1990-06-13	California (PA)
SF	23	(Philippines)	Elmer Espiritu	6 ft 4 in (1.93 m)	185 lb (84 kg)	1985-11-23	UE
C	24	(United States)	Robert Reyes	6 ft 6 in (1.98 m)	215 lb (98 kg)	1983-03-16	Flagler
PF	33	(Philippines)	Ranidel De Ocampo (C)	6 ft 6 in (1.98 m)	200 lb (91 kg)	1981-12-08	Saint Francis of Assisi
C	42	(United States)	Danny Seigle	6 ft 7 in (2.01 m)	215 lb (98 kg)	1976-06-14	Wagner
PF	44	(United States)	Ivan Johnson (I)	6 ft 8 in (2.03 m)	255 lb (116 kg)	1984-04-10	Cal State San Bernardino
SF	51	(Philippines)	Aaron Aban	6 ft 3 in (1.91 m)	200 lb (91 kg)	1982-04-08	Letran

Head coach

- (Philippines) Jong Uichico (De La Salle)

Assistant coach(es)

- (Philippines) Nash Racela
- (Philippines) Bong Ravena (UE)
- (Philippines) Joshua Reyes

Team manager

- (United States) Jimmy Alapag (Cal State San Bernardino)
- (Philippines) Magnum Membrere (Ateneo) (Asst. Mgr.)

Legend

- (C) Team captain
- (CI) Commissioner's Cup Import
- (GI) Governors' Cup Import
- (EI) EASL Import
- (DP) Unsigned draft pick
- (FA) Free agent
- (IN) Inactive
- (S) Suspended
- (R) Rookie
- Injured

Roster

Rain or Shine Elasto Painters roster
Players
Coaches

Pos.	#	POB	Name	Height	Weight	DOB (YYYY–MM–DD)	From
SG	1	(Philippines)	Jonathan Uyloan	6 ft 0 in (1.83 m)	185 lb (84 kg)	1983-11-23	Golden West
PF/C	2	(United States)	Wayne Chism (I)	6 ft 9 in (2.06 m)	220 lb (100 kg)	1987-06-16	Tennessee
PG	3	(Philippines)	Paul Lee	6 ft 0 in (1.83 m)	200 lb (91 kg)	1989-02-14	UE
SF	5	(United States)	Gabe Norwood	6 ft 6 in (1.98 m)	210 lb (95 kg)	1985-02-09	George Mason
SF	6	(Philippines)	Jireh Ibañes (C)	6 ft 3 in (1.91 m)	182 lb (83 kg)	1982-04-20	UP Diliman
SG	8	(Philippines)	Jeric Teng	6 ft 3 in (1.91 m)	182 lb (83 kg)	1991-03-18	UST
PG	9	(Philippines)	Jericho Cruz (R)	6 ft 1 in (1.85 m)	190 lb (86 kg)	1990-10-11	Adamson
PG	11	(Philippines)	Tyrone Tang	5 ft 7 in (1.70 m)	155 lb (70 kg)	1984-09-25	La Salle
SG	16	(Philippines)	Jeffrei Chan	6 ft 2 in (1.88 m)	170 lb (77 kg)	1983-02-11	Far Eastern
PG	17	(Philippines)	Chris Tiu	6 ft 0 in (1.83 m)	175 lb (79 kg)	1985-07-15	Ateneo
SG	18	(Philippines)	Ryan Araña	6 ft 1 in (1.85 m)	180 lb (82 kg)	1985-03-23	La Salle
PF	20	(Philippines)	Jervy Cruz	6 ft 5 in (1.96 m)	220 lb (100 kg)	1986-09-09	UST
C	30	(Philippines)	Beau Belga	6 ft 5 in (1.96 m)	285 lb (129 kg)	1985-11-30	Philippine Christian
C	48	(Philippines)	J.R. Quiñahan	6 ft 6 in (1.98 m)	295 lb (134 kg)	1984-05-08	Visayas
C	57	(Philippines)	Raymond Almazan	6 ft 8 in (2.03 m)	200 lb (91 kg)	1989-08-02	Letran

Head coach

- (Philippines) Yeng Guiao (UP Diliman)

Assistant coach(es)

- (Philippines) Caloy Garcia (St. Benilde)
- (Philippines) Mike Buendia
- (Philippines) Jay Legacion
- (Philippines) Matthew Makalintal
- (Philippines) Ricky Umayam

Team manager

- (Philippines) Mamerto Mondragon^{[a]}
- (Philippines) Boy Lapid (assistant)

Legend

- (C) Team captain
- (CI) Commissioner's Cup Import
- (GI) Governors' Cup Import
- (EI) EASL Import
- (DP) Unsigned draft pick
- (FA) Free agent
- (IN) Inactive
- (S) Suspended
- (R) Rookie
- Injured

- ^{a} also serves as Rain or Shine's board governor.

== Broadcast notes ==
Game	TV5 and AksyonTV Coverage			Fox Sports Coverage	
Game	Play-by-play	Analyst(s)	Courtside reporters	Play-by-play	Analyst(s)
Game 1	Charlie Cuna	Eric Reyes and Richard del Rosario	Rizza Diaz	Andrei Felix	Charles Tiu
Game 2	Magoo Marjon	Dominic Uy and Andy Jao	Erika Padilla	Andrei Felix	Ronnie Magsanoc
Game 3	Charlie Cuna	Ryan Gregorio and Ronnie Magsanoc	Sel Guevara	Jude Turcuato	Kirk Long
Game 4	Magoo Marjon	Quinito Henson and Luigi Trillo	Rizza Diaz	Shawn Weinstein	Charles Tiu
Game 5	Magoo Marjon	Eric Reyes and Richard del Rosario	Sel Guevara	Patricia Bermudez-Hizon	Charles Tiu
Game 6	Magoo Marjon	Dominic Uy and Ronnie Magsanoc	Erika Padilla	Jude Turcuato	Vince Hizon
Game 7	Charlie Cuna	Quinito Henson and Richard del Rosario	Rizza Diaz	Patricia Bermudez-Hizon	Charles Tiu

- Additional Game 7 crew:
  - Trophy presentation: Dominic Uy and Carla Lizardo
  - Dugout interviewer: Sel Guevara
