= NorthPort Batang Pier all-time roster =

The following is a list of players, both past and current, who appeared at least in one game for the NorthPort Batang Pier PBA franchise. Statistics are accurate as of the 2024 PBA Philippine Cup.

== Players ==
^	Denotes player who is currently on the Batang Pier roster								
^{+}	Denotes player who played as an import for the Batang Pier								
G	Guard	G/F	Guard-forward	F	Forward	F/C	Forward-center	C	Center

Player	Place of birth	Pos.	From	Yrs.	Seasons	Statistics					Ref.
Player	Place of birth	Pos.	From	Yrs.	Seasons	GP	MP	PTS	REB	AST	Ref.
Dylan Ababou	Philippines	G/F	UST	1	2017	10	105	40	17	0	
Aaron Aban	Philippines	G/F	Letran	1	2016–2017	16	249	64	40	6	
Alvin Abundo	Philippines	G	Centro Escolar	1	2022	3	6	1	3	0	
Val Acuña	Philippines	G/F	UE	1	2014	3	20	4	2	0	
Ben Adamos^	Philippines	F/C	UPHSD	1	2023–present	12	88	18	8	3	
Rommel Adducul	Philippines	C	San Sebastian	1	2012–2013	14	114	19	25	3	
Japeth Aguilar	Philippines	F/C	Western Kentucky	1	2013	14	393	148	94	18	
Rabeh Al-Hussaini	Philippines	C	Ateneo	1	2012	13	269	107	54	17	
Yousif Aljamal	Philippines	F	San Beda	1	2012–2013	7	87	19	18	3	
Chad Alonzo	Philippines	F	Adamson	1	2013–2014	7	74	7	16	1	
Mychal Ammons^{+}	United States	F	South Alabama	1	2019	6	228	113	81	13	
John Amores^	Philippines	G	José Rizal	1	2023–present	19	149	62	28	8	
Sean Anthony	Canada	F	McGill	4	2017–2021	94	2,986	1,439	757	337	
William Antonio	United States	G/F	Chaminade	1	2012–2013	17	208	62	35	15	
Ryan Araña	Philippines	G	De La Salle	3	2017–2019	50	568	156	113	47	
Jamel Artis^{+}	United States	G	Pittsburgh	1	2022	8	378	237	71	46	
John Apacible	Philippines	F	UE	1	2022	5	19	2	3	0	
MJ Ayaay	Philippines	G	Lyceum	2	2022–2023	35	323	103	49	25	
Nonoy Baclao	Philippines	F/C	Ateneo	1	2014–2015	16	220	32	51	3	
Christian Balagasay	Philippines	F/C	Letran	2	2023, 2023	12	82	13	12	2	
Jerrick Balanza	Philippines	G	Letran	2	2021–2022	50	862	279	99	81	
Gab Banal	Philippines	F	Mapúa	2	2015–2017	4	39	8	3	0	
Mac Baracael	Philippines	F	Far Eastern	1	2017–2018	8	168	62	16	11	
Robert Bolick	Philippines	G	San Beda	3	2019; 2021–2023	83	2,112	1,445	458	512	
Evan Brock^{+}	United States	F	Alabama	1	2014	9	381	242	168	22	
Ronjay Buenafe	Philippines	G	Emilio Aguinaldo	2	2014	40	718	266	91	30	
JR Buensuceso	Philippines	G	BYU–Hawaii	1	2013	3	10	1	1	30	
Allyn Bulanadi^	Philippines	G	San Sebastian	1	2023–present	16	190	118	20	20	
Alex Cabagnot	Philippines	G	Hawaiʻi–Hilo	1	2014	18	675	247	79	129	
Roider Cabrera	Philippines	F	Adamson	1	2014–2015	3	14	3	1	0	
JM Calma^	Philippines	C	San Sebastian	2	2022–present	51	963	362	260	33	
KG Canaleta	Philippines	F	UE	1	2016–2017	15	395	126	86	17	
Prince Caperal	Philippines	F/C	Arellano	3	2014–2015; 2022–2023	47	273	71	48	5	
Derrick Caracter^{+}	United States	F/C	UTEP	1	2015	3	120	61	43	5	
Mark Cardona	Philippines	G	De La Salle	1	2017	5	75	36	22	10	
Robby Celiz	Philippines	G	National-U	1	2017	5	11	0	1	1	
Jeff Chan^	Philippines	G	Far Eastern	2	2022–present	45	806	250	81	80	
Justin Chua	Philippines	F/C	Ateneo	1	2013–2014	20	278	96	63	12	
Mike Cortez	United States	G	De La Salle	1	2015–2016	35	814	242	110	74	
Alex Crisano	United States	F/C	Brooklyn	1	2012	5	18	0	4	4	
Jervy Cruz	Philippines	F	UST	3	2019–2021	35	464	167	135	21	
Marvin Cruz	Philippines	G	Philippines	1	2013	5	42	4	2	1	
Markeith Cummings^{+}	United States	F	Kennesaw State	1	2013	10	435	287	98	28	
Damie Cuntapay^	Philippines	F/C	San Beda	1	2024–present	9	90	29	11	5	
Bonbon Custodio	Philippines	G	UE	1	2014	9	84	22	16	7	
Jopher Custodio	Philippines	G	MLQU	1	2013–2014						
Gary David	Philippines	G	Lyceum	1	2012–2013	31	1,067	582	104	39	
Yancy de Ocampo	Philippines	F/C	Saint Francis of Assisi	1	2014–2015	12	245	61	60	19	
Arthur dela Cruz	Philippines	F	San Beda	1	2022–2023	19	170	58	26	11	
Karl Dehesa	United States	G	Waldorf	1	2017–2018	9	125	39	13	8	
Jason Deutchman	United States	F	San Diego State	1	2012–2013	22	474	152	119	13	
Clint Doliguez	Philippines	G/F	San Beda	1	2021–2022	17	89	23	17	6	
Chris Dumapig	Philippines	F/C	Southwestern-U	1	2022	1	2	0	1	0	
Jojo Duncil	Philippines	G	UST	1	2014–2015	2	23	0	0	0	
Nico Elorde	Philippines	G	Ateneo	4	2017–2021	101	2,030	508	270	300	
Russel Escoto	Philippines	F/C	Far Eastern	1	2019	15	159	55	36	10	
Gabby Espinas	Philippines	F	Philippine Christian	2	2015; 2018	18	197	57	49	11	
Jarrid Famous^{+}	United States	F/C	South Florida	1	2015	9	391	272	207	13	
Bryan Faundo	Philippines	F/C	Letran	1	2013	1	6	0	1	1	
Jeepy Faundo	Philippines	F/C	UST	1	2021	6	53	14	8	1	
Kevin Ferrer	Philippines	F	UST	4	2019–2022	63	1,500	574	225	87	
Cade Flores^	Australia	F	Arellano	1	2023–present	24	631	224	172	50	
Lervin Flores	Philippines	C	Arellano	2	2017–2019	34	209	66	79	5	
James Forrester	Canada	G/F	Arellano	1	2017	10	85	15	12	6	
Cameron Forte^{+}	United States	G/F	Portland State	1	2021	2	66	35	38	6	
Jeric Fortuna	Philippines	G	UST	2	2016; 2018	19	287	52	32	26	
Joseph Gabayni	Philippines	C	Lyceum	2	2017–2019	47	356	91	109	11	
RR Garcia	Philippines	G	Far Eastern	1	2013–2014	32	604	205	54	52	
Mike Glover^{+}	United States	F	USU Eastern	1	2016	9	342	231	126	24	
Jonathan Grey	Philippines	G/F	St. Benilde	4	2017–2021	78	1,176	541	155	84	
Rey Guevarra	Philippines	G/F	Letran	1	2012–2013	14	219	101	24	11	
Bradwyn Guinto	Philippines	F/C	San Sebastian	4	2017–2020	70	1,159	334	269	35	
Justin Harper^{+}	United States	F	Richmond	1	2017	4	164	103	46	4	
Marvin Hayes	Philippines	G/F	José Rizal	4	2013–2014; 2015–2016	41	505	118	91	23	
LeRoy Hickerson^{+}	United States	F	Cumberland University	1	2013	3	128	75	29	7	
Murphy Holloway^{+}	United States	F/C	Mississippi	1	2017	8	337	216	142	29	
Paulo Hubalde	Philippines	G	UE	1	2017	6	53	6	2	3	
Prince Ibeh^{+}	United Kingdom	C	Texas	2	2019; 2022	27	1,077	389	395	37	
Mark Isip	Philippines	F	Far Eastern	2	2014–2016	42	642	201	149	8	
Paolo Javelona	Philippines	G	National-U	1	2018	19	242	96	16	18	
Chris Javier	Philippines	F/C	UE	1	2022	6	47	12	10	1	
Keith Jensen	Philippines	F	NYU	2	2014–2016	62	1,416	398	212	66	
Venky Jois^{+}	Australia	F	Eastern Washington	1	2023–2024	11	453	263	166	62	
Michael Juico	Philippines	G	San Sebastian	1	2017–2018	12	73	23	6	2	
Reed Juntilla	Philippines	G	Visayas	1	2013	7	74	14	6	13	
Jerramy King	United States	G	Long Beach State	1	2019	16	143	38	26	8	
Doug Kramer	Philippines	C	Ateneo	2	2015–2016	51	978	267	318	21	
Omar Krayem^{+}	United States	G	Cal Baptist	1	2015	13	339	171	43	37	
Garvo Lanete	Philippines	G	San Beda	3	2019–2021	59	1,036	447	82	37	
C. J. Leslie^{+}	United States	F	NC State	1	2015	4	149	117	57	13	
Rudy Lingganay	Philippines	G	UE	2	2012–2014	43	539	139	62	44	
Dior Lowhorn^{+}	United States	F	San Francisco	1	2014	6	246	173	66	12	
Zavier Lucero^	United States	F	Philippines	1	2024–present	12	323	145	65	24	
Mark Macapagal	Philippines	G/F	San Sebastian	1	2014	17	305	97	28	15	
Rico Maierhofer	Philippines	F	De La Salle	2	2015–2017	51	620	138	236	39	
Jamie Malonzo	United States	F	De La Salle	2	2021–2022	35	1,241	524	321	81	
Billy Mamaril	Philippines	F/C	Bakersfield	3	2015–2017	83	1,422	305	283	66	
A. J. Mandani	Canada	G	Missouri S&T	1	2012–2013	29	451	147	62	51	
Sean Manganti	United States	F	Adamson	1	2020	11	204	50	32	17	
Vic Manuel	Philippines	F	PSBA	1	2012–2013	14	293	144	67	6	
Ronnie Matias	Philippines	G	Manila	1	2014	10	137	40	37	7	
Eric Menk	United States	F/C	Lake Superior State	1	2013–2014	24	411	119	132	24	
Sol Mercado	United States	G	Biola	2	2013–2014; 2014	35	1,281	557	146	218	
Willie Miller	Philippines	G	Letran	1	2012–2013	38	1,041	427	164	133	
Denok Miranda	Philippines	G	Far Eastern	1	2015	22	359	94	36	36	
Sylvester Morgan^{+}	United States	F/C	Georgia State	1	2013	5	187	88	75	7	
Joshua Munzon^	United States	G/F	Cal State LA	2	2023–present	35	959	387	110	91	
Kevin Murphy^{+}	United States	G/F	Tennessee Tech	1	2023	7	305	257	78	25	
Kelly Nabong	United States	F/C	SRJC	5	2013–2015; 2017–2018; 2020	73	1,546	508	430	82	
William Navarro^	Greece	F	Ateneo	2	2022, 2024–present	18	491	206	132	36	
Leo Najorda	Philippines	F	San Sebastian	1	2013–2014	6	79	23	14	4	
Patrick O'Bryant^{+}	United States	C	Bradley	1	2015	2	76	26	34	7	
Sidney Onwubere	Philippines	F	Emilio Aguinaldo	1	2021	13	360	125	77	15	
Philip Paniamogan	Philippines	G	José Rizal	1	2015–2016	7	27	10	4	5	
Brent Paraiso^	Philippines	G	Letran	1	2023–present	22	314	86	33	33	
Ronald Pascual	Philippines	F	San Sebastian	1	2016	2	4	0	2	0	
Dorian Peña	United States	C	Coppin State	1	2015–2016	15	84	9	19	1	
Mick Pennisi	Australia	C	Michigan State	1	2016–2017	21	277	78	52	9	
Von Pessumal	Philippines	G	Ateneo	1	2016–2017	25	367	126	53	11	
John Pinto	Philippines	G	Arellano	1	2014–2015	21	121	26	30	14	
Jewel Ponferada	Philippines	F/C	National-U	2	2013–2015	48	602	131	165	17	
Stanley Pringle	United States	G	Penn State	5	2014–2019	144	5,208	2,504	876	634	
Michael Qualls^{+}	United States	G	Arkansas	1	2019	11	501	353	142	42	
J. R. Quiñahan	Philippines	F/C	Visayas	2	2016–2017	21	584	223	134	47	
LA Revilla	Philippines	G	De La Salle	2	2013–2014; 2020	14	167	26	25	17	
Troy Rike	United States	F/C	National-U	1	2021–2022	24	326	90	65	7	
Terrence Romeo	Philippines	G	Far Eastern	5	2013–2018	132	4,232	2,685	462	486	
Kris Rosales^	United States	G	Hope International	1	2023–present	16	198	52	17	16	
Jessie Saitanan	Philippines	C	Mapúa	1	2016	2	2	2	0	0	
Kent Salado	Philippines	G	Arellano	2	2022–2023	24	198	68	36	31	
Nico Salva	Philippines	F	Ateneo	1	2013–2014	24	291	79	47	12	
Sunday Salvacion	Philippines	G	St. Benilde	1	2016	6	68	16	7	0	
Jondan Salvador	Philippines	F/C	St. Benilde	2	2012–2014	66	1,010	195	308	46	
Arwind Santos	Philippines	F	Far Eastern	2	2021–2023	33	1,069	410	251	48	
Julian Sargent	United States	G/F	De La Salle	1	2017–2018	19	301	78	47	15	
Anthony Semerad	Australia	F	San Beda	3	2014–2017	70	1,332	337	144	40	
Carlo Sharma	Philippines	F/C	De La Salle	1	2014–2015	3	17	6	3	0	
Walter Sharpe^{+}	United States	F	Mississippi State	1	2014	2	56	26	14	2	
Greg Slaughter	United States	C	Ateneo	1	2021	12	423	198	129	8	
Christian Standhardinger	Germany	F/C	Hawaiʻi	2	2019–2020	21	859	449	261	82	
Renzo Subido	Philippines	G	UST	3	2020–2022	22	285	80	16	30	
Roi Sumang	Philippines	G	UE	3	2015–2016; 2021–2023	60	1,070	143	142	176	
Dominique Sutton^{+}	United States	F	North Carolina Central	1	2016	2	81	52	26	10	
Shawn Taggart^{+}	United States	F/C	Memphis	1	2016	5	205	172	74	13	
Paolo Taha^	Philippines	G/F	St. Benilde	8	2014–2016; 2018–present	168	2,645	955	384	112	
Yousef Taha	Kuwait	C	Mapúa	4	2013; 2014; 2017–2018	25	191	82	137	12	
Moala Tautuaa	United States	F/C	Chadron State	2	2018–2019	53	1,683	732	447	159	
Jeric Teng	Philippines	G	UST	1	2017–2018	19	168	51	19	6	
Hans Thiele	Philippines	F/C	UE	1	2013	3	13	4	2	0	
Steve Thomas^{+}	United States	F/C	Middle Tennessee	1	2015	2	85	33	28	8	
Arvin Tolentino^	Philippines	F	Far Eastern	2	2022–present	47	1,555	869	266	108	
Jabril Trawick^{+}	United States	G/F	Georgetown	1	2017	1	16	3	2	2	
Josh Urbiztondo	United States	G	Fresno Pacific	1	2016–2017	9	71	9	8	9	
Jonathan Uyloan	Philippines	G	Golden West	1	2015–2016	21	258	74	18	20	
Arnold Van Opstal	Germany	C	De La Salle	1	2017–2018	2	7	2	2	0	
Josh Vanlandingham	United States	G	Pacific Lutheran	1	2012–2013	13	215	68	31	6	
Jeff Viernes	Philippines	G	St. Clare	1	2018	3	34	2	2	3	
Louie Vigil	Philippines	F	UST	1	2022–2023	10	54	16	12	5	
Enrico Villanueva	Philippines	F/C	Ateneo	1	2014	1	2	0	1	2	
Calvin Warner^{+}	United States	F	Jacksonville	1	2015	4	165	93	78	15	
Jay Washington	Philippines	F	Eckerd	3	2013–2014; 2015–2016	74	2,217	881	521	124	
Marcus Weathers^{+}	United States	F	SMU	1	2023	4	170	127	40	10	
Malcolm White^{+}	United States	F	LSU	1	2018	4	170	127	40	10	
Brian Williams^{+}	United States	C	Tennessee	1	2016	2	72	32	33	10	
Justin Williams^{+}	United States	F/C	Wyoming	1	2013	7	257	94	126	3	
Sean Williams^{+}	United States	F/C	Boston College	1	2017	3	103	51	45	5	
Rashad Woods^{+}	United States	F/C	Kent State	1	2018	11	464	297	112	39	
Mark Yee	Philippines	F	San Sebastian (Cavite)	2	2012–2014	50	615	190	145	27	
Joseph Yeo	Philippines	G	De La Salle	1	2015–2016	36	856	311	87	67	
Fran Yu^	Philippines	G	Letran	1	2023–present	24	419	154	36	74	
Paul Zamar^	Philippines	G	UE	2	2023–present	29	540	225	46	50	
