= 2015–16 Barako Bull Energy season =

- Head coach: Koy Banal
- General manager: Raymond Rodriguez
- Owners: Energy Food and Drinks, Inc.

Philippine Cup results
- Record: 5–6 (45.5%)
- Place: 8th
- Playoff finish: Quarterfinalist (lost to GlobalPort in one game with twice-to-win disadvantage in Phase 1)

Barako Bull Energy seasons

The 2015–16 Barako Bull Energy season was the 14th and final season of the franchise in the Philippine Basketball Association (PBA). After the Philippine Cup the franchise was sold to Phoenix Petroleum and renamed as the Phoenix Fuel Masters which played its first tournament in the Commissioner's Cup.

== Key dates ==
=== 2015 ===
- August 23: The 2015 PBA draft took place in Midtown Atrium, Robinson Place Manila.

=== 2016 ===
- January 20: The PBA approved the sale of the Barako Bull franchise to Phoenix Petroleum Philippines.

== Draft picks ==
Round	Pick	Player	Position	Nationality	PBA D-League team	College
2	19	Kris Rosales	SG	United States	Jumbo Plastic Linoleum Giants	Hope International
2	21	Michael Miranda	C	Philippines	Wang's Basketball Couriers	San Sebastian
3	27	Yutien Andrada	C	Philippines	Café France Bakers	DLSU
4	38	John Ray Alabanza	PF	Philippines	MJM M-Builders	UE

== Roster ==
2015–16 Barako Bull Energy roster
Players
Coaches

Pos.	#	POB	Name	Height	Weight	DOB (YYYY–MM–DD)	From
G/F	1	(Canada)	James Forrester	6 ft 2 in (1.88 m)	190 lb (86 kg)	1989–09–03	Arellano
G	2	(United States)	Josh Urbiztondo	6 ft 0 in (1.83 m)	185 lb (84 kg)	1983–02–27	Fresno Pacific
G	6	(Philippines)	Emman Monfort	5 ft 6 in (1.68 m)	132 lb (60 kg)	1989–07–02	Ateneo
F	7	(Philippines)	JC Intal (C)	6 ft 4 in (1.93 m)	185 lb (84 kg)	1983–11–18	Ateneo
G	8	(Philippines)	RR Garcia (injured)	5 ft 11 in (1.80 m)	165 lb (75 kg)	1990–01–12	Far Eastern
G	11	(Philippines)	Jeric Fortuna	5 ft 8 in (1.73 m)	170 lb (77 kg)	1991–11–25	UST
F/C	12	(Philippines)	Prince Caperal	6 ft 7 in (2.01 m)	230 lb (104 kg)	1993–06–12	Arellano
G	17	(Germany)	Jens Knuttel (IN)	5 ft 10 in (1.78 m)	169 lb (77 kg)	1989–09–17	Far Eastern
F/C	20	(Philippines)	Yutien Andrada (R)	6 ft 5 in (1.96 m)	203 lb (92 kg)	1990–11–18	De La Salle
G	26	(Philippines)	Chico Lanete	6 ft 0 in (1.83 m)	180 lb (82 kg)	1979–08–01	Lyceum
F	28	(United States)	Willy Wilson	6 ft 3 in (1.91 m)	215 lb (98 kg)	1980–01–30	De La Salle
F/C	34	(Philippines)	Michael Miranda (R)	6 ft 6 in (1.98 m)	210 lb (95 kg)	1990–12–12	San Sebastian
G	42	(Philippines)	Paul Sorongon	6 ft 1 in (1.85 m)	178 lb (81 kg)	1985–12–12	Philippines
F	45	(Philippines)	Mac Baracael	6 ft 4 in (1.93 m)	205 lb (93 kg)	1985–04–14	Far Eastern
C	88	(Australia)	Mick Pennisi	6 ft 9 in (2.06 m)	235 lb (107 kg)	1975–03–13	Eastern Michigan
F	91	(Philippines)	Rodney Brondial	6 ft 4 in (1.93 m)	210 lb (95 kg)	1990–11–20	Adamson

Head coach

- (Philippines) Koy Banal (Mapúa)

Assistant coach(es)

- (Philippines) Arturo Dela Cruz (San Sebastian)
- Jigs Mendoza (Philippines)
- (Philippines) Paolo Rivero (Adamson)

Team manager

- (Philippines) Raymond Rodriguez

Legend

- (C) Team captain
- (CI) Commissioner's Cup Import
- (GI) Governors' Cup Import
- (EI) EASL Import
- (DP) Unsigned draft pick
- (FA) Free agent
- (IN) Inactive
- (S) Suspended
- (R) Rookie
- Injured

Roster

== Philippine Cup ==
=== Eliminations ===
==== Standings ====
Pos	Team	W	L	PCT	GB	Qualification
1	Alaska Aces	9	2	.818 (Note: Head-to-head record: Alaska 1–0 San Miguel)	—	Advance to semifinals
2	San Miguel Beermen	9	2	.818	—	Advance to semifinals
3	Rain or Shine Elasto Painters	8	3	.727	1	Twice-to-beat in the quarterfinals
4	Barangay Ginebra San Miguel	7	4	.636 (Note: Head-to-head record: Barangay Ginebra 1–0 GlobalPort)	2	Twice-to-beat in the quarterfinals
5	GlobalPort Batang Pier	7	4	.636	2	Twice-to-beat in the quarterfinals
6	TNT Tropang Texters	6	5	.545	3	Twice-to-beat in the quarterfinals
7	NLEX Road Warriors	5	6	.455 (Note: Head-to-head record: NLEX 1–0 Barako Bull)	4	Twice-to-win in the quarterfinals
8	Barako Bull Energy	5	6	.455	4	Twice-to-win in the quarterfinals
9	Star Hotshots	4	7	.364	5	Twice-to-win in the quarterfinals
10	Blackwater Elite	3	8	.273	6	Twice-to-win in the quarterfinals
11	Mahindra Enforcer	2	9	.182	7	
12	Meralco Bolts	1	10	.091	8	

Source: PBA.ph

=== Playoffs ===
==== Bracket ====
Quarterfinals (1st phase) (Higher seeds twice-to-beat)
3	Rain or Shine	95
10	Blackwater	90
6	TNT	90
7	NLEX	88
4	Barangay Ginebra	92*
9	Star	89
5	GlobalPort	94
8	Barako Bull	85

Quarterfinals (2nd phase) (Single elimination)
3	Rain or Shine	104
6	TNT	89
4	Barangay Ginebra	83
5	GlobalPort	84*

Semifinals (Best-of-7)
2	San Miguel	4
3	Rain or Shine	2
1	Alaska	4
5	GlobalPort	1

Finals (Best-of-7)
2	San Miguel	4
1	Alaska	3

*Game went into overtime

== Transactions ==
=== Trades ===
Preseason

August 25, 2015	To Barako Bull Jens Knuttel; Emman Monfort; Josh Urbiztondo	To Barangay Ginebra Nico Salva; 2016 1st round pick
August 25, 2015	To Barako Bull Jeric Fortuna	To San Miguel Brian Heruela

September 17, 2015	To Barako Bull Ronald Pascual (from San Miguel)	To Rain or Shine 2016 2nd round pick (from Barako Bull)	To San Miguel Ryan Araña (from Rain or Shine via Barako Bull)

September 19, 2015
September 19, 2015	To Barako Bull Mick Pennisi	To Star 2017 2nd round pick
September 28, 2015	To Barako Bull Mac Baracael; Prince Caperal	To Barangay Ginebra Joe Devance (via Barako Bull)
September 28, 2015	To GlobalPort Dorian Peña	To Star Jake Pascual; Ronald Pascual
October 8, 2015	To Barako Bull 2016 second round pick	To Talk 'N Text Dylan Ababou
October 13, 2015	To Barako Bull Jervy Cruz	To GlobalPort Rico Maierhofer

Philippine Cup

November 16, 2015	To Barako Bull Rodney Brondial; 2018 2nd round pick	To Barangay Ginebra Jervy Cruz
