= 2015–16 Meralco Bolts season =

- Head coach: Norman Black
- General manager: Paolo Trillo
- Owners: Manila Electric Company (an MVP Group subsidiary)

Philippine Cup results
- Record: 1–10 (9.1%)
- Place: 12th
- Playoff finish: Did not qualify

Commissioner's Cup results
- Record: 8–3 (72.7%)
- Place: 2nd
- Playoff finish: Semifinals (lost to Alaska, 2–3)

Governors' Cup results
- Record: 6–5 (54.5%)
- Place: 4th
- Playoff finish: Runners-up (lost to Barangay Ginebra, 2–4)

Meralco Bolts seasons

The 2015–16 Meralco Bolts season was the 6th season of the franchise in the Philippine Basketball Association (PBA).

== Key dates ==
- August 23: The 2015 PBA draft took place in Midtown Atrium, Robinson Place Manila.

== Draft picks ==
Round	Pick	Player	Position	Nationality	PBA D-League team	College
1	4	Chris Newsome	SG/SF	United States	Hapee Fresh Fighters	ADMU
1	7	Baser Amer	PG	Philippines	Hapee Fresh Fighters	San Beda
3	29	Joseph Sedurifa	SG	Philippines	Café France Bakers	CEU

== Roster ==
2015–16 Meralco Bolts roster
Players
Coaches

Pos.	#	POB	Name	Height	Weight	DOB (YYYY–MM–DD)	From
F/C	0	(Philippines)	Bryan Faundo	6 ft 6 in (1.98 m)	225 lb (102 kg)	1984–02–18	Letran
G	1	(Philippines)	Simon Atkins (IN)	5 ft 11 in (1.80 m)	185 lb (84 kg)	1988–07–19	De La Salle
G	3	(United States)	Jimmy Alapag (C)	5 ft 9 in (1.75 m)	160 lb (73 kg)	1977–12–30	Cal State San Bernardino
F	7	(United States)	Cliff Hodge	6 ft 4 in (1.93 m)	195 lb (88 kg)	1988–02–03	Reedley
G	9	(Philippines)	Baser Amer (R)	6 ft 0 in (1.83 m)	170 lb (77 kg)	1992–09–29	San Beda
G	10	(Philippines)	Jonathan Uyloan	6 ft 0 in (1.83 m)	185 lb (84 kg)	1983–11–26	Golden West
G/F	11	(United States)	Chris Newsome (R)	6 ft 2 in (1.88 m)	190 lb (86 kg)	1990–06–25	Ateneo
G/F	13	(Philippines)	Ryan Buenafe	6 ft 2 in (1.88 m)	225 lb (102 kg)	1990–02–01	Ateneo
G	15	(Philippines)	Joseph Sedurifa (R / IN)	6 ft 1 in (1.85 m)	175 lb (79 kg)	1990–09–04	Centro Escolar
G	17	(Philippines)	Anjo Caram	5 ft 7 in (1.70 m)	159 lb (72 kg)	1991–01–14	San Beda
C	18	(Philippines)	Justin Chua	6 ft 5 in (1.96 m)	230 lb (104 kg)	1989–07–13	Ateneo
C	19	(Philippines)	Rabeh Al-Hussaini	6 ft 7 in (2.01 m)	220 lb (100 kg)	1988–08–11	Ateneo
F	20	(United States)	Jared Dillinger (injured)	6 ft 4 in (1.93 m)	220 lb (100 kg)	1984–01–06	Hawaiʻi
F	21	(Philippines)	Reynel Hugnatan	6 ft 4 in (1.93 m)	210 lb (95 kg)	1978–11–03	Manila
F	22	(Philippines)	John Ferriols (IN)	6 ft 4 in (1.93 m)	210 lb (95 kg)	1974–09–09	USJ–R
F/C	23	(United States)	Kelly Nabong	6 ft 6 in (1.98 m)	227 lb (103 kg)	1988–11–17	SRJC
F	24	(Philippines)	Rey Guevarra	6 ft 3 in (1.91 m)	190 lb (86 kg)	1986–11–24	Letran
F/C	25	(Philippines)	Ken Bono (IN)	6 ft 5 in (1.96 m)	280 lb (127 kg)	1984–07–19	Adamson

Head coach

- (United States) Norman Black

Assistant coach(es)

- (Philippines) Ronnie Magsanoc (1st Assistant)
- (Philippines) Luigi Trillo
- (Philippines) Patrick Fran
- (Philippines) Xavier Nunag
- (Philippines) Gene Afable
- (Philippines) Jamike Jarin

Team manager

- (Philippines) Paolo Trillo

Legend

- (C) Team captain
- (CI) Commissioner's Cup Import
- (GI) Governors' Cup Import
- (EI) EASL Import
- (DP) Unsigned draft pick
- (FA) Free agent
- (IN) Inactive
- (S) Suspended
- (R) Rookie
- Injured

Roster

== Philippine Cup ==
=== Eliminations ===
==== Standings ====
Pos	Team	W	L	PCT	GB	Qualification
1	Alaska Aces	9	2	.818 (Note: Head-to-head record: Alaska 1–0 San Miguel)	—	Advance to semifinals
2	San Miguel Beermen	9	2	.818	—	Advance to semifinals
3	Rain or Shine Elasto Painters	8	3	.727	1	Twice-to-beat in the quarterfinals
4	Barangay Ginebra San Miguel	7	4	.636 (Note: Head-to-head record: Barangay Ginebra 1–0 GlobalPort)	2	Twice-to-beat in the quarterfinals
5	GlobalPort Batang Pier	7	4	.636	2	Twice-to-beat in the quarterfinals
6	TNT Tropang Texters	6	5	.545	3	Twice-to-beat in the quarterfinals
7	NLEX Road Warriors	5	6	.455 (Note: Head-to-head record: NLEX 1–0 Barako Bull)	4	Twice-to-win in the quarterfinals
8	Barako Bull Energy	5	6	.455	4	Twice-to-win in the quarterfinals
9	Star Hotshots	4	7	.364	5	Twice-to-win in the quarterfinals
10	Blackwater Elite	3	8	.273	6	Twice-to-win in the quarterfinals
11	Mahindra Enforcer	2	9	.182	7	
12	Meralco Bolts	1	10	.091	8	

Source: PBA.ph

== Commissioner's Cup ==
=== Eliminations ===
==== Standings ====
Pos	Team	W	L	PCT	GB	Qualification
1	San Miguel Beermen	8	3	.727 (Note: Head-to-head record: San Miguel 1–0 Meralco)	—	Twice-to-beat in the quarterfinals
2	Meralco Bolts	8	3	.727	—	Twice-to-beat in the quarterfinals
3	Alaska Aces	7	4	.636 (Note: Head-to-head quotient: Alaska 1.18, Barangay Ginebra 1.03, Rain or Shine 0.84)	1	Best-of-three quarterfinals
4	Barangay Ginebra San Miguel	7	4	.636	1	Best-of-three quarterfinals
5	Rain or Shine Elasto Painters	7	4	.636	1	Best-of-three quarterfinals
6	Tropang TNT	6	5	.545	2	Best-of-three quarterfinals
7	NLEX Road Warriors	5	6	.455 (Note: Head-to-head record: NLEX 1–0 Star)	3	Twice-to-win in the quarterfinals
8	Star Hotshots	5	6	.455	3	Twice-to-win in the quarterfinals
9	Mahindra Enforcer	4	7	.364	4	
10	Blackwater Elite	3	8	.273 (Note: Head-to-head quotient: Blackwater 1.04, Phoenix 0.99, GlobalPort 0.98)	5	
11	Phoenix Fuel Masters	3	8	.273	5	
12	GlobalPort Batang Pier	3	8	.273	5	

Source: PBA.ph

=== Playoffs ===
==== Bracket ====
Quarterfinals
(#1 twice-to-beat)
1	San Miguel	99	103
8	Star	108	99
(Best-of-3)
4	Barangay Ginebra	0
5	Rain or Shine	2
(#2 twice-to-beat)
2	Meralco	104
7	NLEX	97
(Best-of-3)
3	Alaska	2
6	TNT	1

Semifinals (Best-of-5)
1	San Miguel	1
5	Rain or Shine	3
2	Meralco	2
3	Alaska	3

Finals (Best-of-7)
5	Rain or Shine	4
3	Alaska	2

== Governors' Cup ==
=== Eliminations ===
==== Standings ====
Pos	Team	W	L	PCT	GB	Qualification
1	TNT KaTropa	10	1	.909	—	Twice-to-beat in the quarterfinals
2	San Miguel Beermen	8	3	.727 (Note: Head-to-head record: San Miguel 1–0 Barangay Ginebra)	2	Twice-to-beat in the quarterfinals
3	Barangay Ginebra San Miguel	8	3	.727	2	Twice-to-beat in the quarterfinals
4	Meralco Bolts	6	5	.545 (Note: Head-to-head quotient: Meralco 1.039, Mahindra 1.017, Alaska 0.950; fourth seed playoff: Meralco 104–99 Mahindra)	4	Twice-to-beat in the quarterfinals
5	Mahindra Enforcer	6	5	.545	4	Twice-to-win in the quarterfinals
6	Alaska Aces	6	5	.545	4	Twice-to-win in the quarterfinals
7	NLEX Road Warriors	5	6	.455 (Note: Head-to-head quotient: NLEX 1.04, Rain or Shine 1.03, Phoenix 0.93; eighth seed playoff: Phoenix 105–94 Rain or Shine)	5	Twice-to-win in the quarterfinals
8	Phoenix Fuel Masters	5	6	.455	5	Twice-to-win in the quarterfinals
9	Rain or Shine Elasto Painters	5	6	.455	5	
10	GlobalPort Batang Pier	4	7	.364	6	
11	Star Hotshots	2	9	.182	8	
12	Blackwater Elite	1	10	.091	9	

Source: PBA.ph

==== Bracket ====
Quarterfinals (Top 4 twice-to-beat)
1	TNT	136
8	Phoenix	124
4	Meralco	105
5	Mahindra	82
2	San Miguel	114
7	NLEX	110
3	Barangay Ginebra	109
6	Alaska	104

Semifinals (Best-of-5)
1	TNT	1
4	Meralco	3
2	San Miguel	2
3	Barangay Ginebra	3

Finals (Best-of-7)
4	Meralco	2
3	Barangay Ginebra	4

=== Transactions ===
==== Trades ====
Off-season

August 7, 2015	To Blackwater Mike Cortez; James Sena (from Meralco)	To Meralco Jimmy Alapag (from Talk 'N Text via Blackwater)	To Talk 'N Text Larry Rodriguez (from Blackwater)
October 7, 2015	To Mahindra Juneric Baloria; 2016 and 2017 second-round picks (from NLEX)	To Meralco 2016 and 2017 second-round picks (from Mahindra)	To NLEX Sean Anthony (from Meralco via Mahindra)

Commissioner's Cup

March 17, 2016	Waived Gary David	Signings

=== Recruited imports ===
Tournament	Name	Debuted	Last game	Record
Commissioner's Cup	Arinze Onuaku	February 10 (vs. Star)	May 4 (vs. Alaska)	11–6
Governors' Cup	(United States) Allen Durham	July 15 (vs. Phoenix)	October 19 (vs. Ginebra)	13–10
Governors' Cup	(Iran) Mohammad Jamshidi*	July 15 (vs. Phoenix)	August 10 (vs. Rain or Shine)	3–2
