= 2015–16 TNT KaTropa season =

- Head coach: Jong Uichico
- General manager: Virgil Villavicencio; Magnum Membrere (assistant)
- Owners: Smart Communications (an MVP Group subsidiary)

Philippine Cup results
- Record: 6–5 (54.5%)
- Place: 6th
- Playoff finish: Quarterfinalist (lost to Rain or Shine in single-elimination Phase 2)

Commissioner's Cup results
- Record: 6–5 (54.5%)
- Place: 6th
- Playoff finish: Quarterfinalist; Lost to Alaska, 1–2)

Governors' Cup results
- Record: 10–1 (90.9%)
- Place: 1st
- Playoff finish: Semifinalist; Lost to Meralco, 1–3)

TNT KaTropa seasons

The 2015–16 TNT KaTropa season was the 26th season of the franchise in the Philippine Basketball Association (PBA). The team was known as the TNT Tropang Texters in the Philippine Cup, Tropang TNT in the Commissioner's Cup, and TNT KaTropa in the Governors' Cup.

== Key dates ==
- August 23: The 2015 PBA draft took place at Midtown Atrium, Robinson Place Manila.

== Draft picks ==
Round	Pick	Player	Position	Nationality	PBA D-League team	College
1	1	Moala Tautuaa	PF/C	United States	Cebuana Lhuillier Gems	Chadron State
3	31	Michole Sorela	C	Philippines	Hapee Fresh Fighters	San Beda
4	40	Joshua Cubillo	SG	United States	none	CSU Fullerton
5	47	Emilian Vargas	SG	Philippines	none	St. Claire Caloocan

== Roster ==
2015–16 TNT KaTropa roster
Players
Coaches

Pos.	#	POB	Name	Height	Weight	DOB (YYYY–MM–DD)	From
G	1	(United States)	Kris Rosales (R)	6 ft 0 in (1.83 m)	165 lb (75 kg)	1990–12–20	Hope International
F	4	(United States)	Harvey Carey	6 ft 3 in (1.91 m)	210 lb (95 kg)	1979–03–18	Sonoma State
G	5	(Philippines)	Jai Reyes	5 ft 7 in (1.70 m)	150 lb (68 kg)	1987–02–25	Ateneo
F	6	(Philippines)	Dylan Ababou	6 ft 3 in (1.91 m)	185 lb (84 kg)	1986–12–07	UST
F/C	7	(United States)	Moala Tautuaa (R)	6 ft 8 in (2.03 m)	245 lb (111 kg)	1989–04–30	Chadron State
G/F	8	(Philippines)	Alex Nuyles	6 ft 2 in (1.88 m)	199 lb (90 kg)	1989–07–05	Adamson
G	10	(Philippines)	Ryan Reyes	6 ft 2 in (1.88 m)	190 lb (86 kg)	1983–08–10	Cal State Fullerton
G/F	12	(Philippines)	Larry Fonacier	6 ft 2 in (1.88 m)	170 lb (77 kg)	1982–05–13	Ateneo
G	17	(Philippines)	Jayson Castro	5 ft 10 in (1.78 m)	185 lb (84 kg)	1986–06–30	Philippine Christian
F	18	(Philippines)	Troy Rosario (R)	6 ft 7 in (2.01 m)	200 lb (91 kg)	1992–01–20	National-U
F/C	21	(United States)	Kelly Williams	6 ft 6 in (1.98 m)	215 lb (98 kg)	1982–02–07	Oakland
G/F	22	(Philippines)	Matt Ganuelas-Rosser	6 ft 4 in (1.93 m)	190 lb (86 kg)	1990–06–13	Cal Poly Pomona
F	33	(Philippines)	Ranidel de Ocampo (C)	6 ft 6 in (1.98 m)	210 lb (95 kg)	1981–12–08	Saint Francis of Assisi
F	42	(United States)	Danny Seigle	6 ft 6 in (1.98 m)	205 lb (93 kg)	1976–06–14	Wagner
F	51	(Philippines)	Aaron Aban (IN)	6 ft 3 in (1.91 m)	200 lb (91 kg)	1982–04–08	Letran

Head coach

- (Philippines) Jong Uichico

Assistant coach(es)

- (Philippines) Nash Racela (1st Assistant)
- (Philippines) Bong Ravena
- (Philippines) Josh Reyes
- (Philippines) Arturo dela Cruz

Team manager

- (Philippines) Virgil Villavicencio
- (Philippines) Magnum Membrere (Assistant)

Legend

- (C) Team captain
- (CI) Commissioner's Cup Import
- (GI) Governors' Cup Import
- (EI) EASL Import
- (DP) Unsigned draft pick
- (FA) Free agent
- (IN) Inactive
- (S) Suspended
- (R) Rookie
- Injured

Roster

== Philippine Cup ==
=== Eliminations ===
==== Standings ====
Pos	Team	W	L	PCT	GB	Qualification
1	Alaska Aces	9	2	.818 (Note: Head-to-head record: Alaska 1–0 San Miguel)	—	Advance to semifinals
2	San Miguel Beermen	9	2	.818	—	Advance to semifinals
3	Rain or Shine Elasto Painters	8	3	.727	1	Twice-to-beat in the quarterfinals
4	Barangay Ginebra San Miguel	7	4	.636 (Note: Head-to-head record: Barangay Ginebra 1–0 GlobalPort)	2	Twice-to-beat in the quarterfinals
5	GlobalPort Batang Pier	7	4	.636	2	Twice-to-beat in the quarterfinals
6	TNT Tropang Texters	6	5	.545	3	Twice-to-beat in the quarterfinals
7	NLEX Road Warriors	5	6	.455 (Note: Head-to-head record: NLEX 1–0 Barako Bull)	4	Twice-to-win in the quarterfinals
8	Barako Bull Energy	5	6	.455	4	Twice-to-win in the quarterfinals
9	Star Hotshots	4	7	.364	5	Twice-to-win in the quarterfinals
10	Blackwater Elite	3	8	.273	6	Twice-to-win in the quarterfinals
11	Mahindra Enforcer	2	9	.182	7	
12	Meralco Bolts	1	10	.091	8	

Source: PBA.ph

=== Playoffs ===
==== Bracket ====
Quarterfinals (1st phase) (Higher seeds twice-to-beat)
3	Rain or Shine	95
10	Blackwater	90
6	TNT	90
7	NLEX	88
4	Barangay Ginebra	92*
9	Star	89
5	GlobalPort	94
8	Barako Bull	85

Quarterfinals (2nd phase) (Single elimination)
3	Rain or Shine	104
6	TNT	89
4	Barangay Ginebra	83
5	GlobalPort	84*

Semifinals (Best-of-7)
2	San Miguel	4
3	Rain or Shine	2
1	Alaska	4
5	GlobalPort	1

Finals (Best-of-7)
2	San Miguel	4
1	Alaska	3

*Game went into overtime

== Commissioner's Cup ==
=== Eliminations ===
==== Standings ====
Pos	Team	W	L	PCT	GB	Qualification
1	San Miguel Beermen	8	3	.727 (Note: Head-to-head record: San Miguel 1–0 Meralco)	—	Twice-to-beat in the quarterfinals
2	Meralco Bolts	8	3	.727	—	Twice-to-beat in the quarterfinals
3	Alaska Aces	7	4	.636 (Note: Head-to-head quotient: Alaska 1.18, Barangay Ginebra 1.03, Rain or Shine 0.84)	1	Best-of-three quarterfinals
4	Barangay Ginebra San Miguel	7	4	.636	1	Best-of-three quarterfinals
5	Rain or Shine Elasto Painters	7	4	.636	1	Best-of-three quarterfinals
6	Tropang TNT	6	5	.545	2	Best-of-three quarterfinals
7	NLEX Road Warriors	5	6	.455 (Note: Head-to-head record: NLEX 1–0 Star)	3	Twice-to-win in the quarterfinals
8	Star Hotshots	5	6	.455	3	Twice-to-win in the quarterfinals
9	Mahindra Enforcer	4	7	.364	4	
10	Blackwater Elite	3	8	.273 (Note: Head-to-head quotient: Blackwater 1.04, Phoenix 0.99, GlobalPort 0.98)	5	
11	Phoenix Fuel Masters	3	8	.273	5	
12	GlobalPort Batang Pier	3	8	.273	5	

Source: PBA.ph

=== Playoffs ===
==== Bracket ====
Quarterfinals
(#1 twice-to-beat)
1	San Miguel	99	103
8	Star	108	99
(Best-of-3)
4	Barangay Ginebra	0
5	Rain or Shine	2
(#2 twice-to-beat)
2	Meralco	104
7	NLEX	97
(Best-of-3)
3	Alaska	2
6	TNT	1

Semifinals (Best-of-5)
1	San Miguel	1
5	Rain or Shine	3
2	Meralco	2
3	Alaska	3

Finals (Best-of-7)
5	Rain or Shine	4
3	Alaska	2

== Governors' Cup ==
=== Eliminations ===
==== Standings ====
Pos	Team	W	L	PCT	GB	Qualification
1	TNT KaTropa	10	1	.909	—	Twice-to-beat in the quarterfinals
2	San Miguel Beermen	8	3	.727 (Note: Head-to-head record: San Miguel 1–0 Barangay Ginebra)	2	Twice-to-beat in the quarterfinals
3	Barangay Ginebra San Miguel	8	3	.727	2	Twice-to-beat in the quarterfinals
4	Meralco Bolts	6	5	.545 (Note: Head-to-head quotient: Meralco 1.039, Mahindra 1.017, Alaska 0.950; fourth seed playoff: Meralco 104–99 Mahindra)	4	Twice-to-beat in the quarterfinals
5	Mahindra Enforcer	6	5	.545	4	Twice-to-win in the quarterfinals
6	Alaska Aces	6	5	.545	4	Twice-to-win in the quarterfinals
7	NLEX Road Warriors	5	6	.455 (Note: Head-to-head quotient: NLEX 1.04, Rain or Shine 1.03, Phoenix 0.93; eighth seed playoff: Phoenix 105–94 Rain or Shine)	5	Twice-to-win in the quarterfinals
8	Phoenix Fuel Masters	5	6	.455	5	Twice-to-win in the quarterfinals
9	Rain or Shine Elasto Painters	5	6	.455	5	
10	GlobalPort Batang Pier	4	7	.364	6	
11	Star Hotshots	2	9	.182	8	
12	Blackwater Elite	1	10	.091	9	

Source: PBA.ph

==== Bracket ====
Quarterfinals (Top 4 twice-to-beat)
1	TNT	136
8	Phoenix	124
4	Meralco	105
5	Mahindra	82
2	San Miguel	114
7	NLEX	110
3	Barangay Ginebra	109
6	Alaska	104

Semifinals (Best-of-5)
1	TNT	1
4	Meralco	3
2	San Miguel	2
3	Barangay Ginebra	3

Finals (Best-of-7)
4	Meralco	2
3	Barangay Ginebra	4

== Transactions ==
=== Trades ===
Off-season

August 7, 2015	To Blackwater Mike Cortez and James Sena (from Meralco)	To Meralco Jimmy Alapag (from Talk 'N Text via Blackwater)	To Talk 'N Text Larry Rodriguez (from Blackwater)

August 24, 2015	To GlobalPort Jay Washington	To Talk 'N Text Dennis Miranda

August 25, 2015	To NLEX Kevin Alas (from Talk 'N Text via Mahindra)	To Mahindra Niño Canaleta and Aldrech Ramos (from NLEX); Robert Reyes (from Talk 'N Text)	To Talk 'N Text Troy Rosario (from Mahindra)

October 8, 2015	To Barako Bull 2016 second-round pick	To Talk 'N Text Dylan Ababou

=== Recruited imports ===
Tournament	Name	Debuted	Last game	Record
Commissioner's Cup	No Import	February 10 (vs. Blackwater), February 19 (vs. GlobalPort)		1–1
Commissioner's Cup	Ivan Johnson	February 13 (vs. Meralco)	February 13 (vs. Meralco)	0–1
Commissioner's Cup	David Simon	February 24 (vs. Alaska)	April 22 (vs. Alaska)	6–5
Governors' Cup	(United States) Mario Little	July 20 (vs. Rain or Shine)	August 3 (vs. NLEX)	4–0
Governors' Cup	(United States) Mychal Ammons	August 13 (vs. Blackwater)	October 3 (vs. Meralco)	8–4
Governors' Cup	(Syria) Michael Madanly*	July 20 (vs. Rain or Shine)	October 3 (vs. Meralco)	12–4
