= Jawhar Purdy =

Basketball player

Personal information
- Born: December 15, 1991 (age 34) Los Angeles, California, U.S.

Career information
- High school: Impact Basketball Academy (Las Vegas, NV) and Saugus High School (Santa Clarita, CA)
- College: California State University Stanislaus (2013-2014) and College of the Canyons (2011-2013)
- PBA draft: 2015: 5th round, 43rd overall pick
- Drafted by: Blackwater Elite
- Playing career: 2018–2018
- Position: Point guard / shooting guard

Career history
- 2018: Nakhon Pathom Mad Goat
- 2018: Kuala Lumpur Dragons

Career highlights
- California Collegiate Athletic Association Tournament Champion 2014 with California State University Stanislaus and Western State Conference Champion 2013 with College of the Canyons, FilSports Basketball Association Best Player of the Conference

Jawhar William dela Cruz Purdy (born December 15, 1991) is a Filipino-American former professional basketball player. He played college basketball at the California State University, Stanislaus (2013–2014) and College of the Canyons (2011–2013) and was drafted with the 1st pick of the fifth round in the 2015 PBA draft by the Blackwater Elite. He joined the Westports Malaysia Dragons in 2017 and was part of the team for the rest of 2017–18 ABL season. He also played for the AMA Titans in the PBA D-League.

== Personal life ==
Purdy was born in 1991 in Los Angeles to Fatima dela Cruz of Davao City, and William Purdy, a Jackson, Mississippi native. He completed his higher education at Saugus High School and completed his graduation in 2010.

== Career statistics ==
Year	Team	League	G	MIN	PTS	2FGP	3FGP	FT	RO	RD	RT	AS	PF	BS	ST	TO	RNK
2017–18	Westports MD	ASEAN-1	7	31.0	5.0	20.8%	19.0%	59.1%	0.6	1.7	2.3	3.3	2.7	0.0	0.7	1.1	1.9
2018	Mad Goat	THA-1	6	33.2	14.8	29.3%	29.5%	78.8%	1.2	4.5	5.7	6.5	3.0	0.0	1.7	2.0	16.8
