= 2015–16 PBA season =

41st PBA season

- Duration: October 21, 2015 – October 19, 2016
- Teams: 12
- TV partner(s): Local: Sports5; TV5; Fox Sports; Hyper (HD); PBA Rush (HD); International: AksyonTV International

2015 PBA draft
- Top draft pick: Moala Tautuaa
- Picked by: TNT Tropang Texters
- Season MVP: June Mar Fajardo (San Miguel Beermen)
- Top scorer: Terrence Romeo (GlobalPort Batang Pier)
- Philippine Cup champions: San Miguel Beermen
- Philippine Cup runners-up: Alaska Aces
- Commissioner's Cup champions: Rain or Shine Elasto Painters
- Commissioner's Cup runners-up: Alaska Aces
- Governors' Cup champions: Barangay Ginebra San Miguel
- Governors' Cup runners-up: Meralco Bolts

Seasons
- ← 2014–15 2016–17 →

The 2015–16 PBA season was the 41st season of the Philippine Basketball Association (PBA). The league continued to use the three-conference format, starting with the Philippine Cup. The Commissioner's Cup and the Governors' Cup were the second and third conferences of the season.

This season was also the first season of Chito Narvasa as the PBA commissioner when Chito Salud announced his resignation at the end of the 2014–15 season. Salud remained with the PBA as he was the new president and CEO of the league. However, on December 1, 2015, Salud announced his resignation as president and CEO of the PBA that took effect at the end of December 2015, passing both President and CEO positions to Narvasa.

The first event of the season was the 2015 PBA draft which was held on August 23.

This season currently holds the record for most games played in a season, having 266 games played throughout the whole year. It surpassed the previous record of 257 games, previously set during the previous season.

== Executive board ==
- Chito Narvasa (Commissioner/President/CEO)
- Robert Non (Chairman, representing San Miguel Beermen)
- Eric Arejola (Vice-chairman, representing GlobalPort Batang Pier)
- Ramoncito Fernandez (Treasurer, representing NLEX Road Warriors)

== Teams ==
Team	Company	Governor	Coach	Captain
Alaska Aces	Alaska Milk Corporation	Richard Bachmann	Alex Compton	Tony dela Cruz
Barako Bull Energy*	Energy Food and Drinks Inc.	Manny Alvarez	Koy Banal	JC Intal
Barangay Ginebra San Miguel	Ginebra San Miguel, Inc.	Alfrancis Chua	Tim Cone	Mark Caguioa
Blackwater Elite	Ever Bilena Cosmetics, Inc.	Silliman Sy	Leo Isaac	Reil Cervantes
GlobalPort Batang Pier	Sultan 900 Capital, Inc.	Eric Arejola	Johnedel Cardel	Billy Mamaril
Mahindra Enforcer	Columbian Autocar Corporation	Tomas Alvarez	Manny Pacquiao	Niño Canaleta
Meralco Bolts	Manila Electric Company	Al Panlilio	Norman Black	Jimmy Alapag
NLEX Road Warriors	Metro Pacific Investments Corporation	Ramoncito Fernandez	Boyet Fernandez	Asi Taulava
Phoenix Fuel Masters**	Phoenix Petroleum Philippines, Inc.	Dennis Uy	Ariel Vanguardia	Willy Wilson
Rain or Shine Elasto Painters	Asian Coatings Philippines, Inc.	Mamerto Mondragon	Yeng Guiao	Jireh Ibañes
San Miguel Beermen	San Miguel Brewery, Inc.	Robert Non	Leo Austria	Arwind Santos
Star Hotshots	San Miguel Pure Foods Company, Inc.	Rene Pardo	Jason Webb	Rafi Reavis
TNT KaTropa	Smart Communications	Victorico Vargas	Jong Uichico	Ranidel de Ocampo

* - Participated for the 2015–16 PBA Philippine Cup
** - Barako Bull was sold to Phoenix Petroleum in January 2016. Participated beginning the 2016 PBA Commissioner's Cup.

== Arenas ==
Metro Manila venues of the PBA.
Provincial venues of the PBA that hosted one game day (red), and two or more game days (blue).

Like several Metro Manila-centric leagues, most games are held at arenas within Metro Manila, and sometimes, Antipolo. Games outside this area are called "out-of-town" games, and are usually played on Saturdays. Provincial arenas usually host one game, rarely two; these arenas typically host only once per season, but could return occasionally.

=== Main arenas ===
Arena	City
Cuneta Astrodome	Pasay
Filoil Flying V Centre	San Juan
Mall of Asia Arena	Pasay
PhilSports Arena	Pasig
Smart Araneta Coliseum	Quezon City
Ynares Center	Antipolo

=== Out-of-town arenas ===
Aside from games outside Metro Manila and Antipolo, the PBA played two games outside the Philippines, in Dubai. It was the third time the league held games in the United Arab Emirates.

Arena	City	Date	Match-up
University of Southeastern Philippines Gym	Davao City	October 24, 2015	San Miguel vs. GlobalPort
University of Southeastern Philippines Gym	Davao City	April 2, 2016	Star vs. Alaska
Zabeel Stadium	(United Arab Emirates) Dubai	November 6, 2015	Mahindra vs. Alaska
Zabeel Stadium	(United Arab Emirates) Dubai	November 7, 2015	Alaska vs. Barangay Ginebra
Quezon Convention Center	Lucena	November 14, 2015	TNT vs. Star
Quezon Convention Center	Lucena	January 22, 2016	San Miguel vs. Alaska
Quezon Convention Center	Lucena	July 30, 2016	Barangay Ginebra vs. Meralco
Angeles University Foundation Gym	Angeles City	December 5, 2015	Barangay Ginebra vs. Blackwater
Alonte Sports Arena	Biñan, Laguna	February 20, 2016	Mahindra vs. San Miguel; NLEX vs. Star
Alonte Sports Arena	Biñan, Laguna	September 18, 2016	Blackwater vs. San Miguel; TNT vs. Barangay Ginebra
Ibalong Centrum for Recreation	Legazpi, Albay	March 5, 2016	San Miguel vs. Meralco
Ibalong Centrum for Recreation	Legazpi, Albay	August 27, 2016	Rain or Shine vs. GlobalPort
Panabo Multi-Purpose Tourism, Cultural, and Sports Center	Panabo, Davao del Norte	March 19, 2016	Barangay Ginebra vs. Phoenix
Panabo Multi-Purpose Tourism, Cultural, and Sports Center	Panabo, Davao del Norte	August 20, 2016	Alaska vs. Star
Puerto Princesa Coliseum	Puerto Princesa	April 9, 2016	TNT vs. Mahindra
Batangas City Coliseum	Batangas City	September 3, 2016	TNT vs. San Miguel

== Transactions ==
=== Retirement ===
- August 23, 2015: Danny Ildefonso officially announced his retirement after playing 17 seasons in the PBA.
- August 25, 2015: T.Y. Tang officially announced his retirement after playing 7 seasons in the PBA, all of them with the Rain or Shine franchise.
- October 14, 2015: Paul Artadi officially announced his retirement after playing 12 seasons in the PBA. His retirement was announced upon submitting his certificate of candidacy to run as councilor for San Juan in the 2016 elections.
- November 25, 2015: Don Allado officially announced his retirement after playing 16 seasons in the PBA.

=== Coaching changes ===
==== Offseason ====
- July 20, 2015: Barangay Ginebra San Miguel fired head coach Frankie Lim. He was replaced by Star Hotshots coach Tim Cone. Cone's assistant from Star, Richard del Rosario, joins him in his transfer to Ginebra, as well.
- July 20, 2015: Assistant coach Jason Webb was promoted as the head coach of the Star Hotshots.

==== Commissioner's Cup ====
- April 28, 2016: Coach Chito Victolero resigned as interim head coach of Manny Pacquiao of the Mahindra Enforcer.
- April 29, 2016: The Mahindra Enforcer appointed Chris Gavina as their first assistant coach to replace the interim head coach slot vacated by resigned Chito Victolero.
- May 31, 2016: The Phoenix Fuel Masters hired Ariel Vanguardia as replacement for head coach Koy Banal.

== Notable events ==
=== Pre-season ===
- July 16: Columbian Autocar Corporation (CAC) announced that they had changed their team name from Kia Carnival to Mahindra Enforcer.
- September 19: PBA Commissioner Chito Narvasa officially banned sportswriter Snow Badua from covering the league's activities due to his personal "baseless" attacks against Barangay Ginebra board governor Alfrancis Chua.
- October 14: The PBA Board, unanimously approved the memo that supported the Gilas Pilipinas in their participation in the Olympic qualifying tournament, that was held in July 2016, in lieu of this, 17 PBA players constituted the player pool of the Tab Baldwin-mentored national squad.
- October 14: The board of governors approved to adjust the league calendar to accommodate the preparation of the Philippines men's national basketball team for the 2016 FIBA World Olympic Qualifying Tournament. The Commissioner's Cup was extended until May 2016, then the league took a break for the duration of the qualifiers. The season's Governors' Cup will be held after the qualifiers and will finish around October 2016.
- The PBA launched their first 3x3 basketball tournament that catered for women's basketball players on October 23. Each active PBA team was represented by one women's team composed of four players. The women's 3x3 tournament games were to be played in between of the first and second games of the Wednesday and Friday gamedays.

=== Philippine Cup ===
- The Talk 'N Text Tropang Texters silently changed their name to TNT Tropang Texters. This is after their mother company, Talk 'N Text was rebranded as "TNT" last September 2015.
- PBA Commissioner Chito Narvasa imposed an indefinite ban to Mahindra team consultant Joe Lipa, after the latter accused Narvasa of issuing degrading remarks against Mahindra player-coach Manny Pacquiao during a press conference in Dubai. Narvasa made a mandatory summon over Lipa's remarks, but Lipa did not honor it.
- December 1: PBA President and CEO Chito Salud resigned from his post effective December 31. He was replaced by current PBA chairman Robert Non who took over as president and CEO until the board finds his replacement.
- During an out of town game between Barangay Ginebra San Miguel and Blackwater Elite at the AUF Gymnasium, Pampanga, Barangay Ginebra board governor Alfrancis Chua was seen using an e-cigarette while on the team's bench. Since the game was broadcast live on national television, the Department of Health, the Philippine Sports Commission and Angeles University Foundation officials requested the PBA to take action on prohibiting the use of e-cigarettes on the team bench. On December 13, 2015, PBA Commissioner Chito Narvasa issued a reprimand against Alfrancis Chua for the vaping incident.
- In the final eight seconds of the overtime period of the knockout quarterfinal game between Barangay Ginebra San Miguel and GlobalPort Batang Pier, review showed that Stanley Pringle held the ball for over 5 seconds, which would have resulted in a five-second violation, but no call was made. After the final buzzer, the Batang Pier already went to the dugout, but Ginebra stayed behind. Ginebra fans, which were more than half of the crowd, were left stunned along with players and the Ginebra coaching staff. Head coach Tim Cone immediately went to center court and pleaded with the referees for a call or a review of the final 8-second possession of Globalport. He then went to the scorer's table and signed the official scorecard, signifying the team's intent to file a protest with the game's result. He stayed mum after coming out of the dugout on whether they would actually file a protest. Under the league's rules, Barangay Ginebra had until 12 noon of December 28, 2015, to file a letter of protest together with a bond, which requires a minimum of P20,000.
- Barangay Ginebra did not send a formal protest to the PBA office as the 12 noon deadline lapsed on December 28. Commissioner Chito Narvasa said that the league summoned the four referees of the Ginebra-GlobalPort game, Edward Aquino, Rommel Gruta, Mardy Montoya and Bing Oliva, on December 29 and re-evaluated their performance during the quarterfinal game.
- According to the findings of the PBA technical committee on December 29, two violations were not called: the five-second ball-hogging violation and the backcourt violation committed by Stanley Pringle. Referees Edward Aquino and Rommel Gruta were therefore suspended for the rest of the Philippine Cup.
- A total of 16 technical fouls were called during Game 2 of the semifinals series between the Alaska Aces and the GlobalPort Batang Pier on January 6, 2016. An in-game scuffle started when Alaska's Calvin Abueva helped to lift Dondon Hontiveros and bumped GlobalPort's Jay Washington who was helping Anthony Semerad to stand up. Team officials from both sides tried to pacify the players, including commissioner Chito Narvasa. Alaska was assessed with 8 technicals (Abueva, Hontiveros, Manuel, team manager/governor Dickie Bachmann, head coach Alex Compton, and assistant coaches Louie Alas, Monch Gavieres and Jeffrey Cariaso) while GlobalPort got 5 technical fouls (Washington, Semerad, team governor Erick Arejola, head coach Pido Jarencio and team manager Bonnie Tan). Three more technical fouls were called against GlobalPort's Joseph Yeo, Dorian Peña, and Jay Washington on separate plays. The number of technical fouls for this game tied the record of most number of technical fouls called in a single game, tying the record set during a game between the Alaska Milkmen and the Shell Turbo Chargers on October 25, 1997.
- On January 7, a total of P91,200 in fines were slapped to Alaska and GlobalPort players and officials after the scuffle that happened during Game 2 of their semifinals series. Calvin Abueva got the highest fine with P41,600.
- Blackwater Elite women's basketball team consisting of Allana Lim, Camille Sambile, France Mae Cabinbin and Camilla Denise Escoto clinched the inaugural title of the PBA Dickies Women's 3-in-3 tournament in Finals Game 2 against Brgy. Ginebra San Miguel held last January 9, 2016.
- The PBA Board of Governors unanimously approve the sale of Barako Bull Energy's franchise to oil firm Phoenix Petroleum on January 20. In addition, the board also got the green light to Phoenix to play in the 2016 PBA Commissioner's Cup instead of waiting until the 2016–17 season. The new team was named Phoenix Fuel Masters.

=== Commissioner's Cup ===
- February 3: Tropang TNT's import Ivan Johnson was suspended for one game and fined P50,000 after an altercation with JP Erram and Frank Golla during their practice game against Blackwater on January 30.
- The TNT Tropang Texters silently changed their name to Tropang TNT. The team's new logo debuted on February 10 against Blackwater.
- February 13: Ivan Johnson was again fined P250,000 and slapped with a lifetime ban after cursing PBA commissioner Chito Narvasa as he was leaving the playing court after being ejected for incurring his second flagrant foul penalty one at the 2nd quarter of their game against Meralco. The decision was announced during the game's halftime break. The penalty was downgraded into a season ban and P150,000 after Johnson voluntarily appeared on February 17 before Commissioner Narvasa and personally apologized for the infraction during the TNT-Meralco game.
- February 23: Rhose Montreal, the league's Business Development Director since 2008 filed her resignation to the PBA Board of Governors effective immediately. Her resignation came on the heels of an investigative report from PBA-banned sportswriter Snow Badua, that questions the authenticity of Montreal's AB Philosophy diploma from the University of the Philippines. On March 7, the PBA Board decided to rehire Montreal as the Business Development Director of the league, for humanitarian reasons, after a lengthy discussion. PBA chairman Robert Non clarified in a press conference held on March 13 that Montreal was rehired on two conditions: she forfeited her benefits accumulated from 2008 until her resignation and was put on a 6-month probationary period.
- March 7: League commissioner Chito Narvasa appointed as the new CEO of the PBA, replacing officer-in-charge Robert Non. The President/CEO position was eventually dissolved before the start of the Governors' Cup.
- The league's Board of Governors through a board resolution requested the assistance of the National Bureau of Investigation to investigate on who leaked the scholastic records of their marketing director, Rhose Montreal to the media. All rank-and-file employees including Commissioner Chito Narvasa was subjected for investigation.
- March 31: The PBA issued a memorandum order that prevent players who have boy-cut hairdos to play in the PBA Women's 3x3 Basketball tournament, the memorandum has received negative feedback from the players and the Gabriela's women's group for being "discriminatory". Commissioner Narvasa defended the league's decision to ban boy-cut hairdos in the women's league.

=== Governors' Cup ===
- July 3: Gilbert Bulawan died after collapsing while on team practice with Blackwater Elite. He was declared dead on arrival at Capitol Medical Center in Quezon City, Philippines. He is the youngest and very first active player to die in the PBA.
- July 13: The PBA announced the inclusion of female referees in the league's referees pool starting this Governor's Cup, the first in league's history. Edith Botecario and Janine Nicandro, who both graduated in the PBA Referees Academy and once officiated PBA D-League games, became part of the referees that officiated the games. Nicandro was one of the three referees of the conference's first match-up between Meralco Bolts and Phoenix Fuel Masters on July 15, 2016, while Botecario officiated the game between Blackwater Elite and NLEX Road Warriors the following day.
- July 14: PBA-banned sportswriter Snow Badua reported that PBA Communications Director Willie Marcial-owned Chevrolet Trailblazer has illegally using a number 8 plate, a protocol license plate used only by members of the House of Representatives.
- The Phoenix Fuel Masters silently changed their team logo and color scheme. Their new uniforms and logo debuted on July 15.
- July 16: The Blackwater Elite retired the jersey number of Gilbert Bulawan (#11) before their game against the NLEX Road Warriors. The glass-encased jersey was presented to his wife, Dr. Icey Bulawan by team governor Siliman Sy and Reil Cervantes. As part of their tribute, the Elite will wear a black #11 patch on their jerseys and will dedicate the whole conference to Bulawan.
- The Tropang TNT silently changed their name to TNT Katropa. The team's new logo debuted on July 20 against Rain or Shine.
- August 21: Mark Cardona was rushed to the hospital after a suicide attempt. Cardona, who was a reserve player for the NLEX Road Warriors during that time, apparently tried to take his life by consuming a huge amount of prescription pills. A day prior on the incident, he made headlines in TV Patrol after his partner filed a complaint at a Quezon City police station for alleged domestic violence.
- October 6: PBA referee Edward Aquino was removed from the pool of referees as confirmed by the league's media bureau chief Willie Marcial. Two other referees, Rommel Gruta and Reynaldo Yante were relegated to the PBA D-League.
- October 9: During the game 2 of the finals series between the Meralco Bolts and the Barangay Ginebra San Miguel, Jimmy Alapag of the Bolts sank a three-pointer during the second quarter to surpass the 17-year record of 1,242 career triples made by Allan Caidic and become the all-time leader for most three-pointers made in a career.

== Rule changes ==
The PBA board approved the rule changes for implementation starting this season:

1. Deliberate foul – Any player who commits a foul against an opponent by going after the man instead of the ball but without intent to hurt shall be assessed with a deliberate foul which shall result in awarding of two free throws to the offended player plus ball possession to the offended player's team. No 3-minute sit out for the player who committed the deliberate foul. A deliberate foul committed in the last two minutes of the fourth quarter and overtime period(s) shall be subject to automatic video review.
2. Shot clock reset — The shot clock shall be reset to 14 seconds if the ball goes to the offensive team after a legal attempt.
3. Free throw — During a free throw, a player can only enter the free-throw lane ("restricted area") after the ball has hit the rim.
4. Landing spot rule
  1. Leaving a foot on the landing spot of a shooter – if without contact — Flagrant Foul Penalty 1 (FFP1) is called; two Free Throws are awarded; ball possession is retained by the team of offended player; and the offender is sent to the penalty box for three minutes for first offense. Second and subsequent offenses of players from the same team results in a five-minute penalty. A fine of at least Php 5,000.00 is assessed.
  2. Leaving a foot on the landing spot of a shooter – if with contact -Flagrant Foul Penalty 2 (FFP2) is called; two Free Throws are awarded; ball possession is retained by the team of offended player; and the offender is ejected from the game. A fine of at least Php 20,000.00 is assessed, whatever is the consequence of the contact and an automatic, minimum one-game suspension is imposed to the offender.
5. Review of goal tending violation under the last two minutes — Any goal tending violation called in the last two minutes of the fourth quarter and overtime period(s) shall be subject to automatic video review. When a foul is called on a shot and a player touches the ball, basket or backboard and there is a chance to score, even if the referees do not call a goal tending violation, it shall likewise be subject to automatic review if it occurred in the last two minutes of the fourth quarter and overtime period(s).

In addition, the league modified its shot clock rules, adopting a procedure similar to the NBA and Euroleague, featuring tenths of a second. The shot clock should also display the time remaining in the game. A portable shot clock that is capable of displaying tenths of a second and the time remaining in the game is temporarily installed if the in-venue shot clock is not capable to adopt the new shot clock rule or if the shot clock does not also display the game clock. The time the shot clock changes to tenths is determined by the venue and the brand of clock used. The Mall of Asia Arena uses the NBA and Euroleague rule (final five seconds) since its opening, as its Daktronics unit is the same model used by NBA (most venues, 2011–16) and Euroleague venues (Gran Canaria Arena). The Smart Araneta Coliseum's clock registers tenths in the final ten seconds.

== Opening ceremonies ==
The opening ceremonies for this season was held at the Mall of Asia Arena in Pasay on October 21, 2015. The first game of the Philippine Cup between the Star Hotshots and Rain or Shine Elasto Painters immediately followed. The opening was supposed to be held on October 18 at the Smart Araneta Coliseum in Quezon City but was suspended due to the onslaught of Typhoon Lando (international name: Koppu). This was the first time that the league cancelled its opening ceremonies due to bad weather.

The muses for the participating teams are as follows:

Team	Muse
Alaska Aces	Tara, Samantha, and Franchezka Borlain
Barako Bull Energy	Mika Reyes
Barangay Ginebra San Miguel	Arci Muñoz
Blackwater Elite	Max Collins
GlobalPort Batang Pier	Karylle
Mahindra Enforcer	Jasmine Fitzgerald
Meralco Bolts	Eula Caballero
NLEX Road Warriors	Ann Lorraine Colis
Rain or Shine Elasto Painters	Julee Ann Bourgoin
San Miguel Beermen	Alexa Micek and Rachel Daquis
Star Hotshots	Miss Global International 2015 candidates
TNT Tropang Texters	Alyssa Valdez

== 2015–16 PBA Philippine Cup ==
=== Elimination round ===
Pos	Team	W	L	PCT	GB	Qualification
1	Alaska Aces	9	2	.818 (Note: Head-to-head record: Alaska 1–0 San Miguel)	—	Advance to semifinals
2	San Miguel Beermen	9	2	.818	—	Advance to semifinals
3	Rain or Shine Elasto Painters	8	3	.727	1	Twice-to-beat in the quarterfinals
4	Barangay Ginebra San Miguel	7	4	.636 (Note: Head-to-head record: Barangay Ginebra 1–0 GlobalPort)	2	Twice-to-beat in the quarterfinals
5	GlobalPort Batang Pier	7	4	.636	2	Twice-to-beat in the quarterfinals
6	TNT Tropang Texters	6	5	.545	3	Twice-to-beat in the quarterfinals
7	NLEX Road Warriors	5	6	.455 (Note: Head-to-head record: NLEX 1–0 Barako Bull)	4	Twice-to-win in the quarterfinals
8	Barako Bull Energy	5	6	.455	4	Twice-to-win in the quarterfinals
9	Star Hotshots	4	7	.364	5	Twice-to-win in the quarterfinals
10	Blackwater Elite	3	8	.273	6	Twice-to-win in the quarterfinals
11	Mahindra Enforcer	2	9	.182	7	
12	Meralco Bolts	1	10	.091	8	

Source: PBA.ph

=== Playoffs ===
Quarterfinals (1st phase) (Higher seeds twice-to-beat)
3	Rain or Shine	95
10	Blackwater	90
6	TNT	90
7	NLEX	88
4	Barangay Ginebra	92*
9	Star	89
5	GlobalPort	94
8	Barako Bull	85

Quarterfinals (2nd phase) (Single elimination)
3	Rain or Shine	104
6	TNT	89
4	Barangay Ginebra	83
5	GlobalPort	84*

Semifinals (Best-of-7)
2	San Miguel	4
3	Rain or Shine	2
1	Alaska	4
5	GlobalPort	1

Finals (Best-of-7)
2	San Miguel	4
1	Alaska	3

*Game went into overtime

==== Quarterfinals ====
===== 1st phase =====
Team 1	Series	Team 2	Game 1	Game 2
(3) Rain or Shine Elasto Painters*	1–0	(10) Blackwater Elite	95–90	—
(4) Barangay Ginebra San Miguel*	1–0	(9) Star Hotshots	92–89 (OT)	—
(5) GlobalPort Batang Pier*	1–0	(8) Barako Bull Energy	94–85	—
(6) TNT Tropang Texters*	1–0	(7) NLEX Road Warriors	90–88	—

*Team has twice-to-beat advantage. Team #1 only has to win once, while Team #2 has to win twice.

===== 2nd phase =====
Team 1	Score	Team 2
(3) Rain or Shine Elasto Painters	104–89	(6) TNT Tropang Texters
(4) Barangay Ginebra San Miguel	83–84 (OT)	(5) GlobalPort Batang Pier

==== Semifinals ====
Team 1	Series	Team 2	Game 1	Game 2	Game 3	Game 4	Game 5	Game 6	Game 7
(1) Alaska Aces	4–1	(5) GlobalPort Batang Pier	93–107	100–76	82–69	109–84	118–89	—	—
(2) San Miguel Beermen	4–2	(3) Rain or Shine Elasto Painters	109–105	97–105	106–111	105–92	103–94	90–82	—

==== Finals ====
Team 1	Series	Team 2	Game 1	Game 2	Game 3	Game 4	Game 5	Game 6	Game 7
(1) Alaska Aces	3–4	(2) San Miguel Beermen	100–91	83–80	82–75	104–110 (OT)	73–86 (OT)	89–100	89–96

- Finals MVP: Chris Ross (San Miguel Beermen)
- Best Player of the Conference: June Mar Fajardo (San Miguel Beermen)

== 2016 PBA Commissioner's Cup ==
=== Elimination round ===
Pos	Team	W	L	PCT	GB	Qualification
1	San Miguel Beermen	8	3	.727 (Note: Head-to-head record: San Miguel 1–0 Meralco)	—	Twice-to-beat in the quarterfinals
2	Meralco Bolts	8	3	.727	—	Twice-to-beat in the quarterfinals
3	Alaska Aces	7	4	.636 (Note: Head-to-head quotient: Alaska 1.18, Barangay Ginebra 1.03, Rain or Shine 0.84)	1	Best-of-three quarterfinals
4	Barangay Ginebra San Miguel	7	4	.636	1	Best-of-three quarterfinals
5	Rain or Shine Elasto Painters	7	4	.636	1	Best-of-three quarterfinals
6	Tropang TNT	6	5	.545	2	Best-of-three quarterfinals
7	NLEX Road Warriors	5	6	.455 (Note: Head-to-head record: NLEX 1–0 Star)	3	Twice-to-win in the quarterfinals
8	Star Hotshots	5	6	.455	3	Twice-to-win in the quarterfinals
9	Mahindra Enforcer	4	7	.364	4	
10	Blackwater Elite	3	8	.273 (Note: Head-to-head quotient: Blackwater 1.04, Phoenix 0.99, GlobalPort 0.98)	5	
11	Phoenix Fuel Masters	3	8	.273	5	
12	GlobalPort Batang Pier	3	8	.273	5	

Source: PBA.ph

=== Playoffs ===
Quarterfinals
(#1 twice-to-beat)
1	San Miguel	99	103
8	Star	108	99
(Best-of-3)
4	Barangay Ginebra	0
5	Rain or Shine	2
(#2 twice-to-beat)
2	Meralco	104
7	NLEX	97
(Best-of-3)
3	Alaska	2
6	TNT	1

Semifinals (Best-of-5)
1	San Miguel	1
5	Rain or Shine	3
2	Meralco	2
3	Alaska	3

Finals (Best-of-7)
5	Rain or Shine	4
3	Alaska	2

==== Quarterfinals ====
Team 1	Series	Team 2	Game 1	Game 2
(1) San Miguel Beermen*	1–1	(8) Star Hotshots	99–108	103–99
(2) Meralco Bolts*	1–0	(7) NLEX Road Warriors	104–97	—

Team 1	Series	Team 2	Game 1	Game 2	Game 3
(3) Alaska Aces	2–1	(6) Tropang TNT	99–106	85–81	99–81
(4) Barangay Ginebra San Miguel	0–2	(5) Rain or Shine Elasto Painters	84–88	89–102	—

*Team has twice-to-beat advantage. Team #1 only has to win once, while Team #2 has to win twice.

==== Semifinals ====
Team 1	Series	Team 2	Game 1	Game 2	Game 3	Game 4	Game 5
(1) San Miguel Beermen	1–3	(5) Rain or Shine Elasto Painters	94–98	96–98	104–98	99–124	—
(2) Meralco Bolts	2–3	(3) Alaska Aces	94–97	92–87	72–92	86–70	70–76

==== Finals ====
Team 1	Series	Team 2	Game 1	Game 2	Game 3	Game 4	Game 5	Game 6	Game 7
(3) Alaska Aces	2–4	(5) Rain or Shine Elasto Painters	97–105	103–105	108–112	111–99	86–78	92–109	—

- Finals MVP: Paul Lee (Rain or Shine Elasto Painters)
- Best Player of the Conference: Calvin Abueva (Alaska Aces)
- Bobby Parks Best Import of the Conference: Arinze Onuaku (Meralco Bolts)

== 2016 PBA Governors' Cup ==
=== Elimination round ===
Pos	Team	W	L	PCT	GB	Qualification
1	TNT KaTropa	10	1	.909	—	Twice-to-beat in the quarterfinals
2	San Miguel Beermen	8	3	.727 (Note: Head-to-head record: San Miguel 1–0 Barangay Ginebra)	2	Twice-to-beat in the quarterfinals
3	Barangay Ginebra San Miguel	8	3	.727	2	Twice-to-beat in the quarterfinals
4	Meralco Bolts	6	5	.545 (Note: Head-to-head quotient: Meralco 1.039, Mahindra 1.017, Alaska 0.950; fourth seed playoff: Meralco 104–99 Mahindra)	4	Twice-to-beat in the quarterfinals
5	Mahindra Enforcer	6	5	.545	4	Twice-to-win in the quarterfinals
6	Alaska Aces	6	5	.545	4	Twice-to-win in the quarterfinals
7	NLEX Road Warriors	5	6	.455 (Note: Head-to-head quotient: NLEX 1.04, Rain or Shine 1.03, Phoenix 0.93; eighth seed playoff: Phoenix 105–94 Rain or Shine)	5	Twice-to-win in the quarterfinals
8	Phoenix Fuel Masters	5	6	.455	5	Twice-to-win in the quarterfinals
9	Rain or Shine Elasto Painters	5	6	.455	5	
10	GlobalPort Batang Pier	4	7	.364	6	
11	Star Hotshots	2	9	.182	8	
12	Blackwater Elite	1	10	.091	9	

Source: PBA.ph

=== Playoffs ===
Quarterfinals (Top 4 twice-to-beat)
1	TNT	136
8	Phoenix	124
4	Meralco	105
5	Mahindra	82
2	San Miguel	114
7	NLEX	110
3	Barangay Ginebra	109
6	Alaska	104

Semifinals (Best-of-5)
1	TNT	1
4	Meralco	3
2	San Miguel	2
3	Barangay Ginebra	3

Finals (Best-of-7)
4	Meralco	2
3	Barangay Ginebra	4

==== Quarterfinals ====
Team 1	Series	Team 2	Game 1	Game 2
(1) TNT KaTropa*	1–0	(8) Phoenix Fuel Masters	136–124	—
(2) San Miguel Beermen*	1–0	(7) NLEX Road Warriors	114–110	—
(3) Barangay Ginebra San Miguel*	1–0	(6) Alaska Aces	109–104	—
(4) Meralco Bolts*	1–0	(5) Mahindra Enforcer	105–82	—

*Team has twice-to-beat advantage. Team #1 only has to win once, while Team #2 has to win twice.

==== Semifinals ====
Team 1	Series	Team 2	Game 1	Game 2	Game 3	Game 4	Game 5
(1) TNT KaTropa	1–3	(4) Meralco Bolts	113–95	91–106	113–119	88–94	—
(2) San Miguel Beermen	2–3	(3) Barangay Ginebra San Miguel	108–115	95–92	96–97	101–72	92–117

==== Finals ====
Team 1	Series	Team 2	Game 1	Game 2	Game 3	Game 4	Game 5	Game 6	Game 7
(3) Barangay Ginebra San Miguel	4–2	(4) Meralco Bolts	109–114 (OT)	82–79	103–107	88–86	92–81	91–88	—

- Finals MVP: LA Tenorio (Barangay Ginebra)
- Best Player of the Conference: Jayson Castro (TNT KaTropa)
- Bobby Parks Best Import of the Conference: Allen Durham (Meralco Bolts)

== Individual awards ==
=== Leo Awards ===
- Most Valuable Player: June Mar Fajardo (San Miguel)
- Rookie of the Year: Chris Newsome (Meralco)
- First Mythical Team:
  - Jayson Castro (TNT)
  - Terrence Romeo (GlobalPort)
  - June Mar Fajardo (San Miguel)
  - Calvin Abueva (Alaska)
  - Arwind Santos (San Miguel)
- Second Mythical Team:
  - Alex Cabagnot (San Miguel)
  - LA Tenorio (Barangay Ginebra)
  - Asi Taulava (NLEX)
  - Japeth Aguilar (Barangay Ginebra)
  - Sean Anthony (NLEX)
- All-Defensive Team:
  - Chris Exciminiano (Alaska)
  - Chris Ross (San Miguel)
  - Marc Pingris (Star)
  - Japeth Aguilar (Barangay Ginebra)
  - Gabe Norwood (Rain or Shine)
- Most Improved Player: Jericho Cruz (Rain or Shine)
- Samboy Lim Sportsmanship Award: June Mar Fajardo (San Miguel)

=== Awards given by the PBA Press Corps ===
- Defensive Player of the Year: Chris Ross (San Miguel)
- Scoring Champion: Terrence Romeo (GlobalPort)
- Baby Dalupan Coach of the Year: Leo Austria (San Miguel)
- Mr. Quality Minutes: Jericho Cruz (Rain or Shine)
- Bogs Adornado Comeback Player of the Year: Paul Lee (Rain or Shine)
- Danny Floro Executive of the Year: Raymund Yu and Terry Que (Rain or Shine)
- Order of Merit: Jayson Castro (TNT)
- All-Rookie Team
  - Chris Newsome (Meralco)
  - Troy Rosario (TNT)
  - Scottie Thompson (Barangay Ginebra)
  - Arthur dela Cruz (Blackwater)
  - Maverick Ahanmisi (Rain or Shine)
- All-Interview Team
  - Yeng Guiao (Rain or Shine)
  - LA Tenorio (Ginebra)
  - Paul Lee (Rain or Shine)
  - Jimmy Alapag (Meralco)
  - Arwind Santos (San Miguel)
  - Asi Taulava (NLEX)

== Statistics ==
=== Individual statistical leaders ===
==== Local players ====
Category	Player	Team	Statistic
Points per game	Terrence Romeo	GlobalPort Batang Pier	25.4
Rebounds per game	June Mar Fajardo	San Miguel Beermen	12.2
Assists per game	Jayson Castro	TNT KaTropa	6.0
Steals per game	Chris Ross	San Miguel Beermen	1.9
Blocks per game	John Paul Erram	Blackwater Elite	1.9
Turnovers per game	Terrence Romeo	GlobalPort Batang Pier	3.7
Fouls per game	John Paul Erram	Blackwater Elite	4.3
Minutes per game	Stanley Pringle	GlobalPort Batang Pier	38.9
FG%	Bradwyn Guinto	Mahindra Enforcer	60.0%
FT%	Garvo Lanete	NLEX Road Warriors	97.1%
3FG%	Aldrech Ramos	Mahindra Enforcer	47.5%
Double-doubles	June Mar Fajardo	San Miguel Beermen	37
Triple-doubles	Scottie Thompson	Barangay Ginebra San Miguel	1

==== Import players ====
Category	Player	Team	Statistic	Conference played
Points per game	Tyler Wilkerson	San Miguel Beermen	36.6	Commissioner's
Rebounds per game	Kenny Adeleke	Phoenix Fuel Masters	20.5	Commissioner's
Assists per game	Allen Durham	Meralco Bolts	5.0	Governors'
Steals per game	Marqus Blakely	Star Hotshots	2.5	Governors'
Steals per game	Dominique Sutton	GlobalPort Batang Pier	2.5	Governors'
Blocks per game	David Simon	TNT KaTropa	2.7	Commissioner's
Turnovers per game	Josh Dollard	Rain or Shine Elasto Painters	5.7	Governors'
Fouls per game	Marqus Blakely	Star Hotshots	2.5	Governors'
Fouls per game	Marcus Simmons	Phoenix Fuel Masters	2.5	Governors'
Minutes per game	Tyler Wilkerson	San Miguel Beermen	43.0	Commissioner's
FG%	Brian Williams	GlobalPort Batang Pier	66.7%	Commissioner's
FT%	Arizona Reid	San Miguel Beermen	88.9%	Commissioner's and Governors'
3FG%	Robert Dozier	Alaska Aces	50.0%	Commissioner's
Double-doubles	Allen Durham	Meralco Bolts	22	Governors'
Triple-doubles	M. J. Rhett	Blackwater Elite	1	Commissioner's
Triple-doubles	Elijah Millsap	San Miguel Beermen	1	Governors'

=== Individual game highs ===
==== Local players ====
Category	Player	Team	Statistic	Conference
Points	June Mar Fajardo	San Miguel Beermen	43	Philippine
Rebounds	Greg Slaughter	Barangay Ginebra San Miguel	26	Philippine
Assists	Jayson Castro	TNT KaTropa	13	Governors'
Steals	Chris Ross	San Miguel Beermen	7	Philippine
Blocks	John Paul Erram	Blackwater Elite	7	Philippine
Three point field goals	Joseph Yeo	GlobalPort Batang Pier	9	Governors'

==== Import players ====
Category	Player	Team	Statistic	Conference
Points	Al Thornton	NLEX Road Warriors	69	Commissioner's
Rebounds	Arinze Onuaku	Meralco Bolts	30	Commissioner's
Assists	Allen Durham	Meralco Bolts	13	Governors'
Steals	Justin Brownlee	Barangay Ginebra San Miguel	6	Governors'
Blocks	David Simon	TNT KaTropa	5	Commissioner's
Blocks	Arinze Onuaku	Meralco Bolts	5	Commissioner's
Blocks	Eric Dawson	Blackwater Elite	5	Governors'
Three point field goals	Tyler Wilkerson	San Miguel Beermen	8	Commissioner's
Three point field goals	Michael Madanly	TNT KaTropa	8	Governors'
Three point field goals	Henry Walker	NLEX Road Warriors	8	Governors'

=== Team statistical leaders ===
Category	Team	Statistic
Points per game	Phoenix Fuel Masters	102.9
Rebounds per game	Barangay Ginebra San Miguel	49.8
Assists per game	Barangay Ginebra San Miguel	22.3
Steals per game	Alaska Aces	7.3
Blocks per game	San Miguel Beermen	4.9
Turnovers per game	Rain or Shine Elasto Painters	17.5
FG%	Meralco Bolts	45.3%
FT%	Mahindra Enforcer	74.8%
3FG%	Alaska Aces	35.2%

== Cumulative standings ==
- Note: Barako Bull Energy only competed during the Philippine Cup. The franchise was then bought and a new franchise, the Phoenix Fuel Masters, participated in the import-laden conferences. Their records are not combined since they are different franchises.

Pos	Team	Pld	W	L	PCT	Best finish
1	San Miguel Beermen	58	38	20	.655	Champions
2	Barangay Ginebra San Miguel	49	31	18	.633	Champions
3	Rain or Shine Elasto Painters	54	33	21	.611	Champions
4	TNT Tropang Texters / Tropang TNT / TNT KaTropa	43	26	17	.605	Semifinalist
5	Alaska Aces	60	36	24	.600	Finalist
6	Meralco Bolts	51	25	26	.490	Finalist
7	GlobalPort Batang Pier	40	17	23	.425	Semifinalist
8	NLEX Road Warriors	36	15	21	.417 (Note: Head-to-head record: NLEX 1–0 Barako Bull)	Quarterfinalist
9	Barako Bull Energy	12	5	7	.417	Quarterfinalist
10	Phoenix Fuel Masters	24	9	15	.375	Quarterfinalist
11	Mahindra Enforcer	35	12	23	.343	Quarterfinalist
12	Star Hotshots	36	12	24	.333	Quarterfinalist
13	Blackwater Elite	34	7	27	.206	Quarterfinalist

=== Elimination rounds ===
Pos	Team	Pld	W	L	PCT
1	San Miguel Beermen	33	25	8	.758
2	Alaska Aces	33	22	11	.667 (Note: Elimination round head-to-head: Alaska 4–2, TNT 3–3, Barangay Ginebra 2–4)
3	Barangay Ginebra San Miguel	33	22	11	.667
4	TNT Tropang Texters / Tropang TNT / TNT KaTropa	33	22	11	.667
5	Rain or Shine Elasto Painters	33	20	13	.606
6	Meralco Bolts	33	15	18	.455 (Note: Elimination round head-to-head: Meralco 2–1 (.667), Barako Bull 1–1 (.500), NLEX 1–3 (.333))
7	Barako Bull Energy	11	5	6	.455
8	NLEX Road Warriors	33	15	18	.455
9	GlobalPort Batang Pier	33	14	19	.424
10	Phoenix Fuel Masters	22	8	14	.364 (Note: Elimination round head-to-head: Phoenix 2–0 Mahindra)
11	Mahindra Enforcer	33	12	21	.364
12	Star Hotshots	33	11	22	.333
13	Blackwater Elite	33	7	26	.212

=== Playoffs ===
Pos	Team	Pld	W	L
1	Alaska Aces	27	14	13
2	Rain or Shine Elasto Painters	21	13	8
3	San Miguel Beermen	25	13	12
4	Meralco Bolts	18	10	8
5	Barangay Ginebra San Miguel	16	9	7
6	TNT Tropang Texters / Tropang TNT / TNT KaTropa	10	4	6
7	GlobalPort Batang Pier	7	3	4
8	Phoenix Fuel Masters	2	1	1
9	Star Hotshots	3	1	2
10	Barako Bull Energy	1	0	1
11	Blackwater Elite	1	0	1
12	Mahindra Enforcer	2	0	2
13	NLEX Road Warriors	3	0	3

== See also ==
- PBA Women's 3×3
