= Troy Rosario =

Filipino basketball player (born 1992)

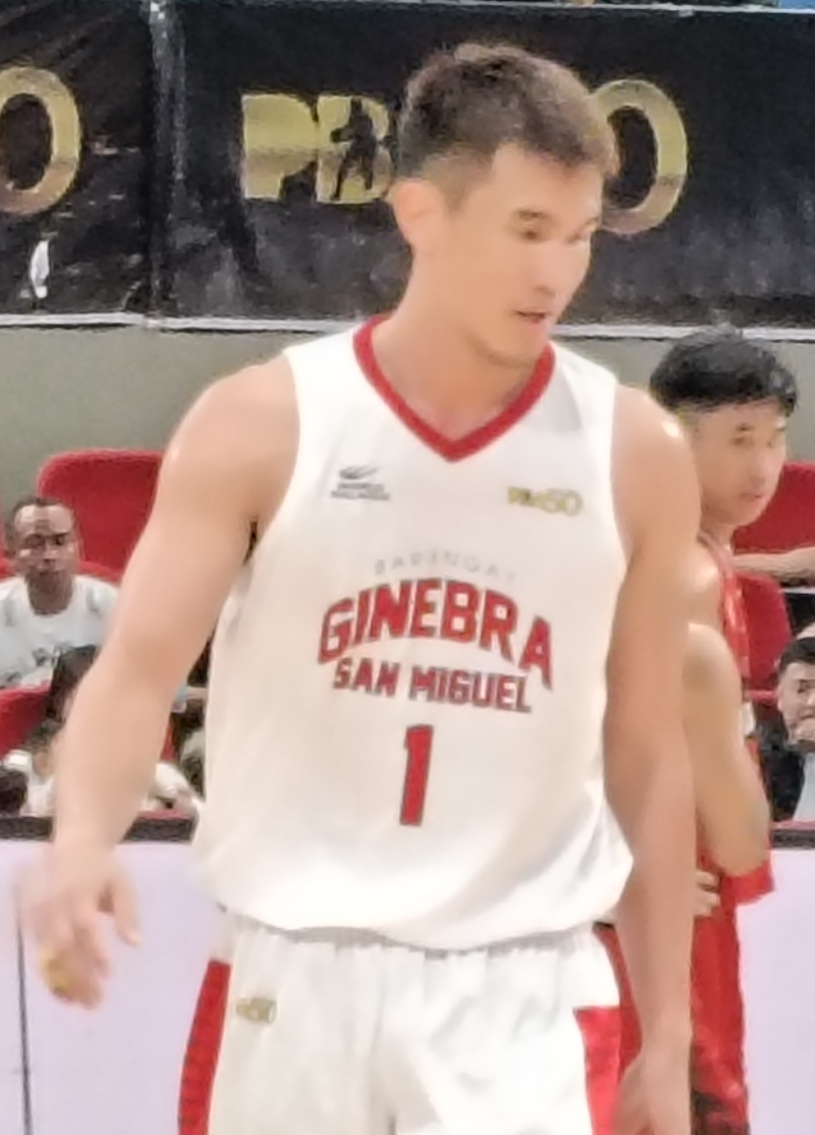
- Rosario with Barangay Ginebra San Miguel in 2025

No. 1 – Barangay Ginebra San Miguel
- Position: Power forward / center
- League: PBA

Personal information
- Born: January 20, 1992 (age 34) Mandaluyong, Philippines
- Listed height: 6 ft 7 in (2.01 m)
- Listed weight: 218 lb (99 kg)

Career information
- College: TIP (2009–2010); NU (2011–2014)
- PBA draft: 2015: 1st round, 2nd overall pick
- Drafted by: Mahindra Enforcer
- Playing career: 2015–present

Career history
- 2015–2022: TNT Tropang Texters/Tropang TNT/TNT KaTropa/TNT Tropang Giga
- 2022–2024: Blackwater Bossing
- 2024–present: Barangay Ginebra San Miguel

Career highlights
- 2× PBA champion (2021 Philippine, 2026 Commissioner's); 4× PBA All-Star (2016–2019); PBA All-Star Game MVP (2017 Mindanao); PBA Mythical Second Team (2019); PBA All-Rookie Team (2016); PBA D-League champion (2014–15 Aspirant's); UAAP champion (2014)

Jeth Troy Utanes Rosario (born January 20, 1992) is a Filipino professional basketball player for the Barangay Ginebra San Miguel of the Philippine Basketball Association (PBA).

== College and amateur career ==
Rosario played for two years at Technological Institute of the Philippines. He left TIP to focus on his stint for the RP Youth Team then-coached by NU Bulldogs coach Eric Altamirano. Then he suited for the NU Bulldogs after transferring from TIP. In his final season with the Bulldogs, he averaged 12.3 points and 8.6 rebounds per game, as his team made history by winning their first championship since 1954.

After his college career was over, Rosario suited up for the Hapee Fresh Fighters in the PBA D-League, where he teamed up with fellow college standouts and future draft batchmates Chris Newsome, Baser Amer, Scottie Thompson and Garvo Lanete. They won the 2015 Aspirants' Cup together.

== Professional career ==
=== TNT Tropang Giga franchise (2015–2022) ===
Rosario was drafted second overall by the Mahindra Enforcer in the 2015 PBA draft. Two days later, the Enforcers shipped his rights to the Talk 'N Text Tropang Texters via a complicated three-team which also involved TNT's sister team, NLEX Road Warriors. On August 27, 2015, both he and #1 pick Moala Tautuaa signed maximum three-year rookie contracts with the Talk 'N Text Tropang Texters worth ₱8.5 million.

=== Blackwater Bossing (2022–2024) ===
On September 19, 2022, Rosario was traded to the Blackwater Bossing in a three-team trade involving Blackwater, TNT, and NLEX Road Warriors. On October 3, 2024, Rosario became a free agent after his contract expired.

=== Barangay Ginebra San Miguel (2024–present) ===
On November 25, 2024, Rosario signed a three-year contract with the Barangay Ginebra San Miguel.

== Career statistics ==
Legend
GP	Games played	MPG	Minutes per game	FG%	Field-goal percentage
3FG%	3-point field-goal percentage	4P%	4-point field-goal percentage	FT%	Free-throw percentage
RPG	Rebounds per game	APG	Assists per game	SPG	Steals per game
BPG	Blocks per game	PPG	Points per game	127	Career high

=== PBA ===
As of the end of 2024–25 season

Year	Team	GP	MPG	FG%	3P%	4P%	FT%	RPG	APG	SPG	BPG	PPG
2015–16	TNT	39	25.7	.471	.365	—	.632	5.4	.8	.3	.2	11.9
2016–17	TNT	56	23.4	.445	.267	—	.704	6.0	1.0	.4	.4	9.8
2017–18	TNT	35	27.3	.463	.347	—	.615	7.1	1.0	.4	.4	12.7
2019	TNT	50	31.7	.489	.364	—	.657	5.5	1.1	.6	.2	15.4
2020	TNT	22	30.7	.356	.242	—	.633	7.4	1.9	.4	.4	10.9
2021	TNT	33	25.7	.482	.230	—	.681	6.4	.8	.3	.3	10.2
2022–23	TNT	30	26.2	.424	.262	—	.531	4.8	1.2	.2	.6	10.4
2022–23	Blackwater	30	26.2	.424	.262	—	.531	4.8	1.2	.2	.6	10.4
2023–24	Blackwater	20	30.7	.495	.407	—	.670	6.2	2.5	.8	.4	14.1
2024–25	Blackwater	56	30.7	.526	.253	.500	.632	6.1	1.8	.4	.3	11.4
2024–25	Barangay Ginebra	56	30.7	.526	.253	.500	.632	6.1	1.8	.4	.3	11.4
Career		341	27.9	.467	.312	.500	.645	6.0	1.3	.4	.3	11.8

=== UAAP ===
==== Elimination rounds ====
Year	Team	GP	MPG	FG%	3P%	FT%	RPG	APG	SPG	BPG	PPG
2012–13	NU	13	18.5	.413	.167	.625	3.9	.9	.1	.5	5.8
2013–14	NU	13	12.6	.404	.167	.688	2.8	.2	.2	.5	3.8
2014–15	NU	14	27.5	.458	.182	.615	8.4	2.4	.3	.6	11.3
Career		40	19.7	.437	.173	.632	5.1	1.2	.2	.5	7.1

==== Playoffs ====
Year	Team	GP	MPG	FG%	3P%	FT%	RPG	APG	SPG	BPG	PPG
2013–14	NU	2	8.5	.750	.000	.000	3.5	.5	.0	.5	3.0
2014–15	NU	6	29.7	.412	.182	.375	9.5	1.5	.2	.7	10.2
Career		8	24.4	.431	.182	.375	7.4	1.3	.1	.6	8.4

== International career ==
As a member of the Gilas Cadets, Rosario saw action in the 2015 Southeast Asian Games and the 2015 SEABA Championship, where his team won gold medals on both occasions. He was also included in the Gilas Pilipinas 3.0 pool that competed in the 2015 FIBA Asia Championship. He saw action in the 2015 William Jones Cup but did not make it to the Final 12 roster for 2015 FIBA Asia Championship.

== Player profile ==
Rosario has the build to play power forward or center, and is also mobile and athletic enough to be a small forward.

== Personal life ==
He is the older brother of CJ Rosario, a former member of the Arellano University's women's volleyball team, now playing professionally for the Petron Tri-Activ Spikers in the Philippine Super Liga. Like his younger sister, Rosario also played volleyball and has even represented Cagayan Valley in the Palarong Pambansa before converting to basketball.

Troy Rosario is married to Michelle Aguas. They have two daughters.
