= Kris Rosales =

Filipino-American basketball player

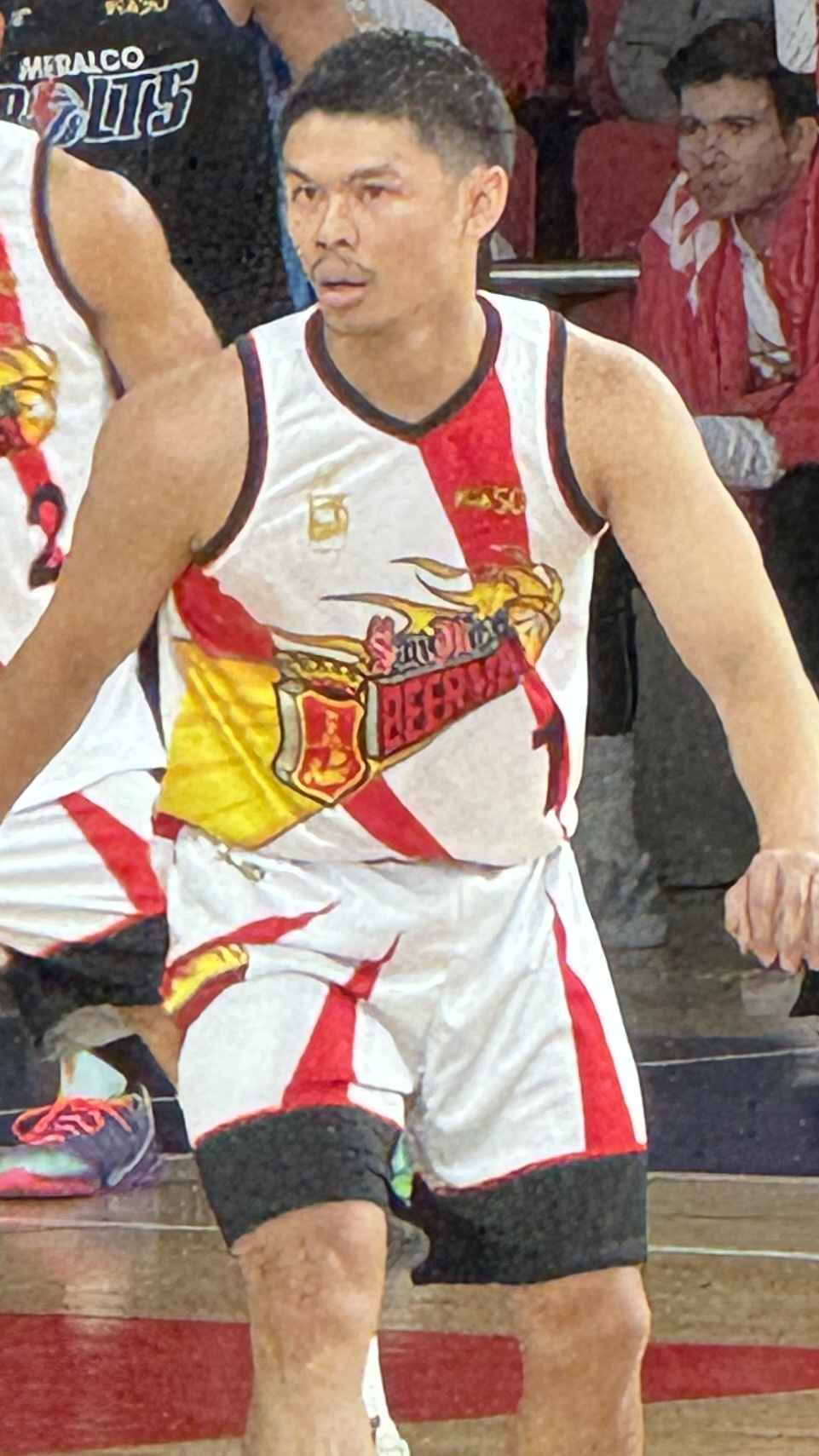
- Rosales with the San Miguel Beermen in 2026

No. 1 – San Miguel Beermen
- Position: Point guard
- League: PBA

Personal information
- Born: December 20, 1990 (age 35) Bellflower, California, U.S.
- Listed height: 6 ft 0 in (1.83 m)
- Listed weight: 165 lb (75 kg)

Career information
- High school: St. John Bosco (Bellflower, California)
- College: Hope International University (2009–2013)
- NBA draft: 2013: undrafted
- PBA draft: 2015: 2nd round, 19th overall pick
- Drafted by: Barako Bull Energy
- Playing career: 2015–present

Career history
- 2015: Singapore Slingers
- 2016–2017: TNT KaTropa
- 2019–2020: Rain or Shine Elasto Painters
- 2021–2023: NLEX Road Warriors
- 2023–2024: NorthPort Batang Pier
- 2024–present: San Miguel Beermen

Career highlights
- 2× PBA champion (2025 Philippine, 2025–26 Philippine)

Krismoir Sajise Rosales (born December 20, 1990) is a Filipino-American professional basketball player for the San Miguel Beermen of the Philippine Basketball Association (PBA). He was drafted 19th overall in the 2015 PBA draft by the Barako Bull Energy.

== Early life and amateur career ==
Rosales started playing basketball at the age of 4 in his backyard. His father, Nielon Rosales, built a basketball court for him and his older brother, Nayton. At the age of 7 he joined his first basketball league in the city of Bellflower, California. He played a year of junior varsity and three years of varsity basketball at St. John Bosco High School under Coach Chris Madigan. After graduating high school in 2009 he accepted a scholarship from coach Bill Czech to play at NAIA Division 1 school at Hope International University in Fullerton, California.

== College career ==
In Rosales' freshman year, he played in all 30 games with 28 starts for the Royals. He scored a season high 26 points against San Diego Christian Hawks. He missed a triple double by two rebounds with 10 points, 10 assists, and 8 rebounds in season finale against Biola. They were in last place that season.

As a sophomore, Rosales led the team with 1.7 steals per game and placed 4th in the entire GSAC steals leaderboard. He scored a season high 24 points against the Concordia Golden Eagles a game after scoring 23 points against Westmont. He then grabbed a career high nine rebounds in the season finale against the Trinity Christian Trolls.

In his junior year, Rosales started all 30 games. He was in the top 5 for the entire GSAC in assists, steals, and minutes per game. He also set new career-highs in points and assists with 30 and 12 respectively in different games.

In 2013, Rosales became Hope's first Golden State Athletic Conference Player of the Year, and the first Royal in the program's then-near 60-year history to receive first-team National Association of Intercollegiate Athletics honors. They also qualified for the NAIA National Tournament that season. He finished his college career as Hope International's eighth-leading scorer and one of three players in the program's history with more than 1,500 points and 400 assists.

== Professional career ==
Rosales worked out for the Toronto Raptors twice, once in Fullerton and the other in Los Angeles. He also worked out for the Sacramento Kings at a local high school in Sacramento. He also worked out with the Los Angeles Clippers at their practice facility and a day later he flew to New Jersey to work out with the Brooklyn Nets at their facility.

=== PBA D-League ===
On October 30, 2014, after going undrafted in the 2013 NBA D-League Draft and a hardluck campaign to make it to the NBA D-League, Rosales made his PBA D-League debut as the part of Jumbo Plastic Linoleum Giants. He helped the Giants to win their game against Bread Story−LPU Smashing Bakers with a score of 79–74. Rosales also played for Tanduay Light Rhum Masters for four games in the 2015 PBA D-League Foundation Cup but his team felt short at the quarterfinals.

=== ABL ===
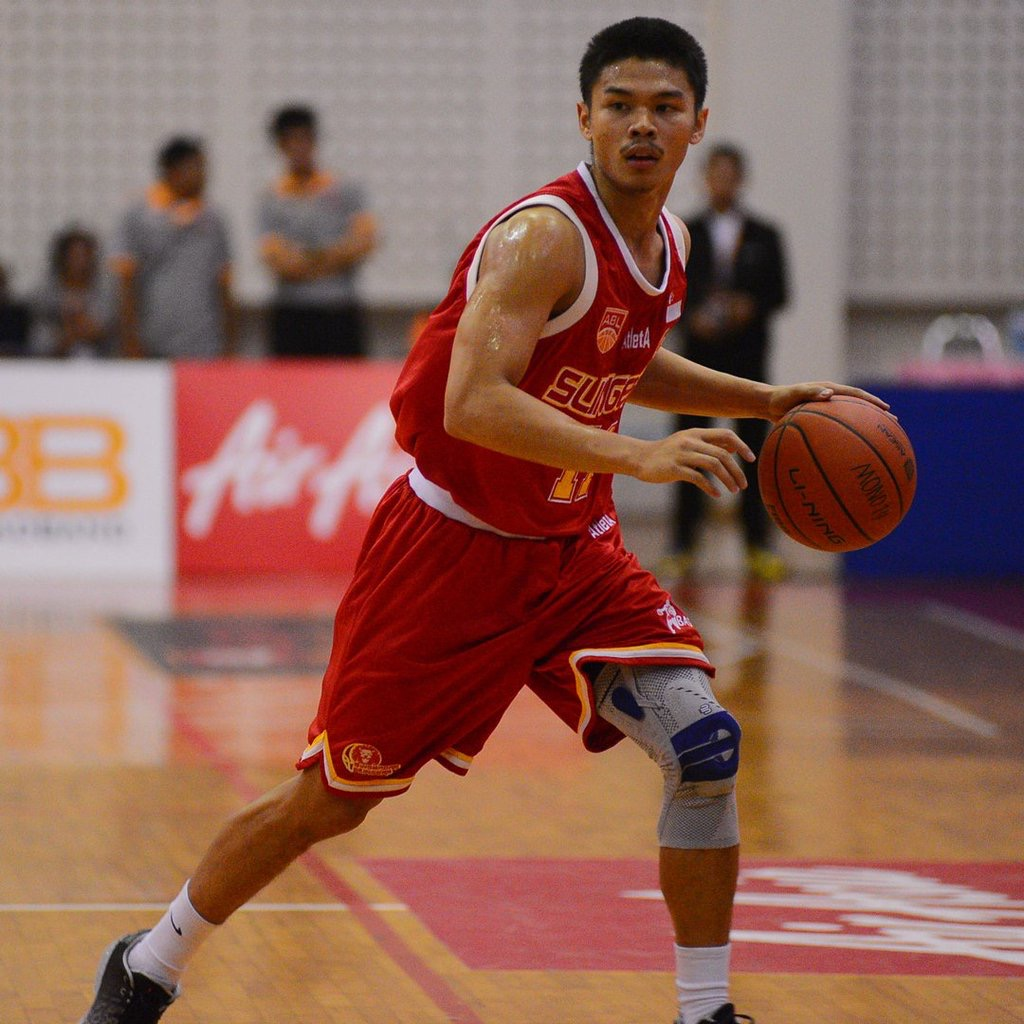
Rosales with the Singapore Slingers in 2015

In 2015 Rosales was recruited by the Singapore Slingers of the ASEAN Basketball League (ABL) where he led the Slingers to a runner-up finish. He was awarded Player of the Week after finishing with 20 points on 50% from the field, 5 rebounds, 5 assists, and a steal in a win over the Saigon Heat. He averaged 10 points, 3.2 assists, and 1.4 steals per game during the ABL's regular season.

=== PBA ===
Rosales was drafted 7th in the second round and 19th overall by the Barako Bull Energy also known now as the Phoenix Fuel Masters during the 2015 PBA draft. The Fuel Masters were unable to sign him due to the team's heavy guard rotation.

==== TNT Katropa ====
Rosales then signed a 2 1/2-year deal with the TNT Katropa after his stint in the ABL. In just his second career PBA game, Rosales recorded 13 points on 4 for 8 shooting from the field in just 22 minutes of playing time.

In his sophomore season, Rosales scored 15 points in a loss to the NLEX Road Warriors. He also took part in the Obstacle Challenge during the 2017 PBA All-Star Week. He scored 15 points once again as he temporarily became a starter with Jayson Castro busy with national team duties. That season, TNT made it to the 2017 Commissioner's Cup Finals. In Game 5, he had a PBA career-high 16 points off the bench, but TNT still lost to the San Miguel Beermen. San Miguel clinched the Finals the following game. In the Governors' Cup, he injured his knee and was declared out for the rest of the season.

==== Rain or Shine Elasto Painters ====
Rosales was then traded along with Sidney Onwubere and a 2018 first-round pick in exchange for Jericho Cruz. After two surgeries, he was able to play for Rain or Shine. He helped RoS win its fourth straight game in the 2019 Philippine Cup with his 16 points. In that year's Governors' Cup, he had 18 points, three rebounds and three steals in a loss to NLEX.

In the 2020 Philippine Cup, Rosales had 15 points and six rebounds in their first win of the season, which was against San Miguel. He then had a team-high 14 points and eight rebounds in a loss to the Magnolia Hotshots. After the season, it was announced that Rain or Shine would not be renewing his contract.

==== NLEX Road Warriors ====
Rosales took to coaching basketball for fourth graders while staying in shape while he was unsigned. He was then signed by the NLEX Road Warriors. He was expected to fill in for Kiefer Ravena, who had left the team to play in Japan, and be a backcourt partner for Kevin Alas. In his NLEX debut, he had nine points, three rebounds, and three assists in 19 minutes of a win over SMB. He dislocated his pinky against the Meralco Bolts, but he was still cleared to play. In a win over the Blackwater Elite, he matched his PBA career-high of 18 points while also giving four assists and two steals.

The following season, Rosales had a PBA career-high 29 points on seven threes, but NLEX still lost to the Converge FiberXers. He missed Game 1 of their Philippine Cup quarterfinal against Magnolia due to health and safety protocols. He then missed some games in that year's Commissioner's Cup due to a calf strain, including the debut of his new coach Frankie Lim. Against the Bay Area Dragons, he had 12 points as the Dragons beat them by 20 points.

==== NorthPort Batang Pier ====
On December 11, 2023, Rosales was traded to the NorthPort Batang Pier in a three-team trade involving NorthPort, NLEX, and San Miguel Beermen. On June 7, 2024, he signed a one-year contract extension with the Batang Pier.

==== San Miguel Beermen ====
On August 5, 2024, Rosales was picked up by the San Miguel Beermen after he was released by NorthPort.

== Career statistics ==
Legend
GP	Games played	MPG	Minutes per game	FG%	Field-goal percentage
3FG%	3-point field-goal percentage	4P%	4-point field-goal percentage	FT%	Free-throw percentage
RPG	Rebounds per game	APG	Assists per game	SPG	Steals per game
BPG	Blocks per game	PPG	Points per game	127	Career high

=== PBA ===
As of the end of 2025–26 season

Year	Team	GP	MPG	FG%	3P%	4P%	FT%	RPG	APG	SPG	BPG	PPG
2015–16	TNT	16	17.3	.397	.375	—	.871	1.9	2.9	.4	—	5.7
2016–17	TNT	43	14.5	.446	.370	—	.674	1.3	1.2	.2	.0	5.2
2019	Rain or Shine	45	18.2	.339	.301	—	.735	2.1	1.5	.6	.0	4.7
2020	Rain or Shine	12	18.9	.307	.226	—	.750	4.0	1.8	.4	.1	5.2
2021	NLEX	17	19.6	.444	.419	—	.850	2.2	1.9	1.3	.1	7.2
2022–23	NLEX	34	22.8	.377	.293	—	.558	2.4	2.5	.6	.1	7.6
2023–24	NLEX	23	16.7	.398	.311	—	.763	1.3	1.8	.6	.0	5.8
2023–24	NorthPort	23	16.7	.398	.311	—	.763	1.3	1.8	.6	.0	5.8
2024–25	San Miguel	43	12.3	.391	.353	.000	.789	1.1	1.4	.5	—	3.8
2025–26	San Miguel	31	11.2	.378	.294	.143	.647	1.0	1.2	.4	.1	3.3
Career		264	16.3	.386	.324	.100	.724	1.7	1.7	.5	.0	5.2

=== College ===
Year	Team	GP	GS	FG%	3P%	FT%	RPG	APG	SPG	BPG	PPG
2009-10	Hope International	30	28	.414	.162	.656	3.9	2.4	1.5	.1	11.0
2010-11	Hope International	33	32	.478	.333	.696	3.2	2.3	1.7	.1	11.8
2011-12	Hope International	30	30	.421	.407	.754	4.6	4.0	2.0	.2	12.6
2012-13	Hope International	33	33	.457	.267	.711	4.2	4.4	2.0	.3	13.4
Career		126	123	.444	.302	.706	3.9	3.3	1.8	.2	12.2

== Personal life ==
In 2020, Rosales started the Creative Hoop Project, a small business that combines his other interests, basketball, skating, and coffee.

Rosales is married to Hillary Brown, who was his girlfriend for 14 years. His brother-in-law Jared Brown is set to play for the Ateneo Blue Eagles.
