= Moala Tautuaa =

Filipino basketball player (born 1989)

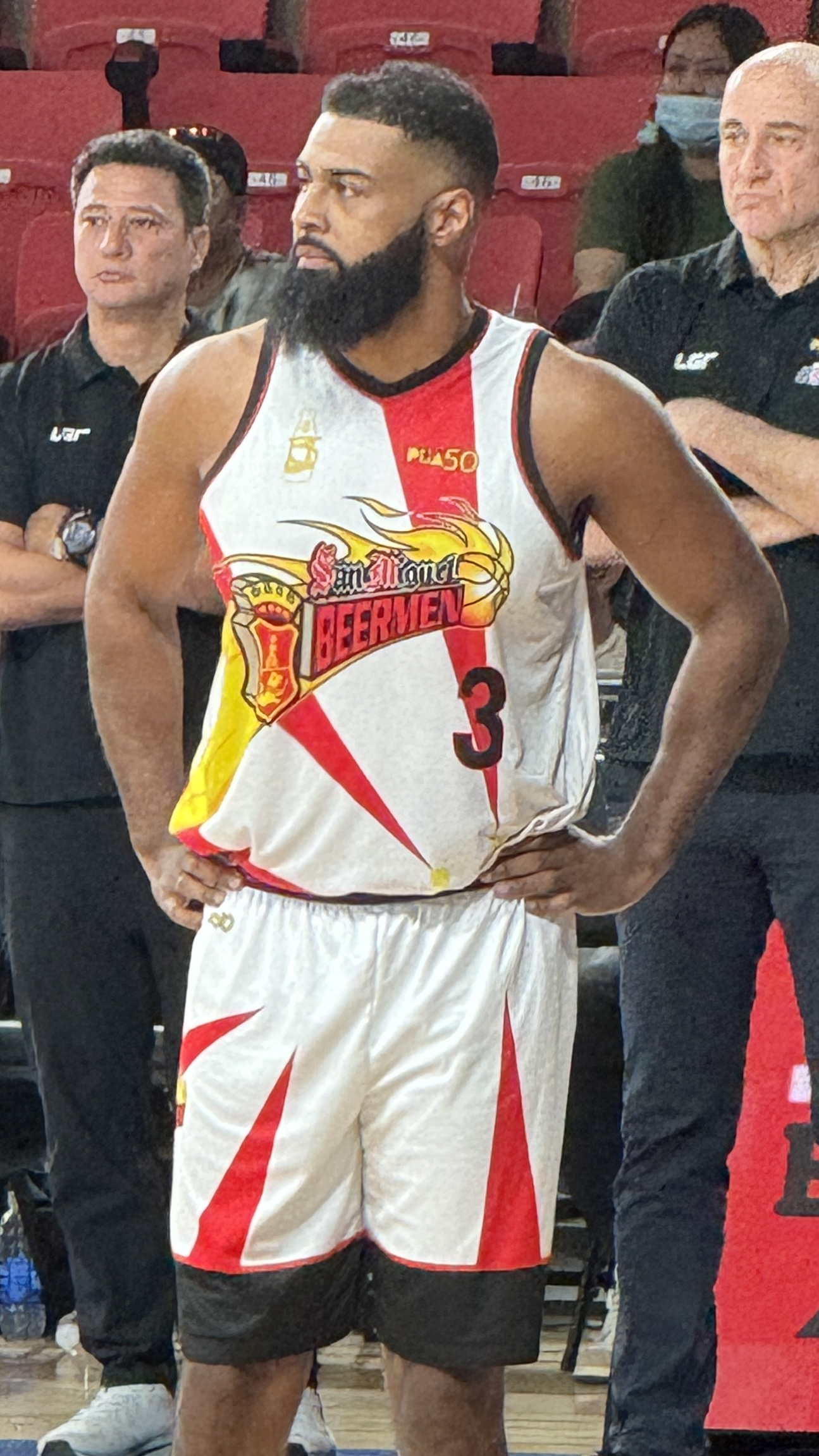
- Tautuaa with the San Miguel Beermen in 2026

No. 3 – San Miguel Beermen
- Position: Center / power forward
- League: PBA

Personal information
- Born: April 30, 1989 (age 37) San Mateo, California, U.S.
- Listed height: 6 ft 8 in (2.03 m)
- Listed weight: 245 lb (111 kg)

Career information
- High school: Claremont (Claremont, California)
- College: Chadron State (2008–2012)
- NBA draft: 2012: undrafted
- PBA draft: 2015: 1st round1st overall
- Drafted by: Talk 'N Text Tropang Texters
- Playing career: 2012–present

Career history
- 2012–2014: Westports Malaysia Dragons
- 2015–2018: TNT Tropang Texters / Tropang TNT / TNT KaTropa
- 2018–2019: NorthPort Batang Pier
- 2019–present: San Miguel Beermen

Career highlights
- 4× PBA champion (2022 Philippine, 2023–24 Commissioner's, 2025 Philippine, 2025–26 Philippine); PBA Most Improved Player (2019); PBA All-Star (2017)
Medals
Men's basketball
Philippines
SEA Games
Silver medal – second place	2021 Hanoi	Team
William Jones Cup
Silver medal – second place	2015 Taipei	Team
Men's 3x3 basketball
Philippines
SEA Games
Gold medal – first place	2019 Philippines	Team

Moala Delvalle Tautuaa Jr. (born April 30, 1989) is an American born Filipino-Tongan professional basketball player for the San Miguel Beermen of the Philippine Basketball Association (PBA). He was drafted first overall by the TNT Tropang Texters in the 2015 PBA draft.

== High school and college career ==
Tautuaa attended high school at Claremont High School in Claremont, California. In his senior year at Claremont High, he averaged 21 points and seven rebounds per game.

He suited up for Chadron State College, an NCAA Division II school. He led the CSC Eagles in scoring with 12.9 points a game and rebounding with 5.6 per game in his senior year. His 63.5 percent field goal percentage led the team and ranked second in the Rocky Mountain Athletic Conference. During his career at CSC, he shot 62.6 percent (426–681) from the field to break the old mark of 61.9 percent that Elijah Collins set during 2001–05. He finished with 1,160 points, tying him for 17th all-time at CSC.

== Professional career ==
=== ABL / PBA D-League ===
He applied for the 2012 NBA draft but went undrafted. He then decided to resume his basketball career by playing as an import for the Westports Malaysia Dragons in the ASEAN Basketball League. Initially discovered by former PBA player Pongky Alolor, he was introduced to KL Dragons' head coach Ariel Vanguardia during the latter's visit to San Francisco and was recruited to join the team. He became teammates and friends with PBA player Justin Melton. He averaged 15.6 points, 7.6 rebounds and 0.6 block for the Dragons, who started off the 2014 season with a 2–1 win–loss record.

After his stint in the ABL, he processed his citizenship papers at the Bureau of Immigration of the Philippines to prove his Filipino lineage and applied for the 2014 PBA D-League Draft, where he was drafted first overall by Cagayan Rising Suns. He helped the Suns reach the Finals against the powerhouse Hapee Fresh Fighters. He was then signed by the Cebuana Lhuillier Gems into a one-conference contract, where he spent the remainder of the season. He was the 2015 PBA D-League Foundation Cup MVP while playing for Cebuana Lhuillier and took them to the semifinals.

=== PBA ===
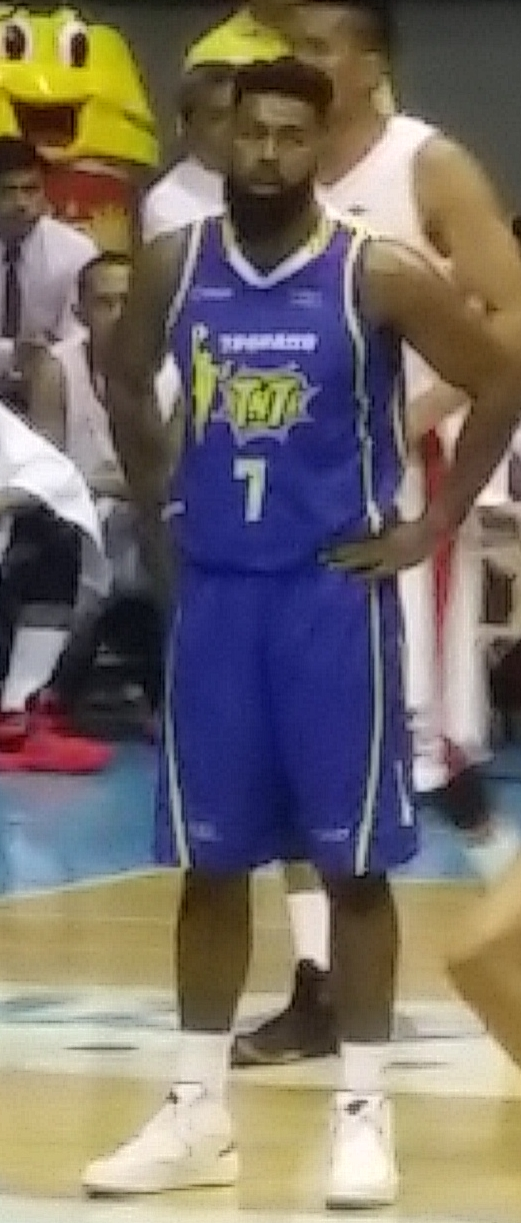
Tautuaa with TNT in 2016

After spending a season in the D-League, he applied, along with 16 other Fil-Foreigners, for the 2015 PBA draft, according to the list released by the PBA on August 10, 2015. He, along with former NU Bulldog Troy Rosario, was the consensus top pick leading to the draft day.

On August 23, 2015, he was drafted 1st overall by the TNT Tropang Texters in the rookie draft. On August 27, 2015, both he and newly acquired #2 pick Troy Rosario signed maximum three-year rookie contracts with Talk 'N Text worth ₱ 8.5 million.

== PBA career statistics ==
Legend
GP	Games played	MPG	Minutes per game	FG%	Field-goal percentage
3FG%	3-point field-goal percentage	4P%	4-point field-goal percentage	FT%	Free-throw percentage
RPG	Rebounds per game	APG	Assists per game	SPG	Steals per game
BPG	Blocks per game	PPG	Points per game	127	Career high

As of the end of 2025–26 season

=== Season-by-season averages ===
Year	Team	GP	MPG	FG%	3P%	4P%	FT%	RPG	APG	SPG	BPG	PPG
2015–16	TNT	41	17.6	.541	.289	—	.600	4.1	1.2	.4	.2	8.9
2016–17	TNT	59	17.3	.519	.152	—	.563	4.7	.8	.3	.2	7.9
2017–18	TNT	34	25.5	.500	.290	—	.649	8.1	1.9	.5	.4	9.8
2017–18	GlobalPort / NorthPort	34	25.5	.500	.290	—	.649	8.1	1.9	.5	.4	9.8
2019	NorthPort	38	31.2	.499	.321	—	.670	7.5	2.9	.7	.2	14.0
2019	San Miguel	38	31.2	.499	.321	—	.670	7.5	2.9	.7	.2	14.0
2020	San Miguel	13	35.2	.602	.333	—	.600	8.1	2.5	.9	.5	18.6
2021	San Miguel	32	19.1	.507	.293	—	.686	4.6	.8	.3	.4	9.0
2022–23	San Miguel	50	20.0	.559	.378	—	.542	4.9	1.5	.4	.2	8.9
2023–24	San Miguel	43	18.2	.500	.372	—	.597	4.2	1.0	.4	.5	6.4
2024–25	San Miguel	49	16.4	.464	.240	.000	.739	3.4	.9	.3	.4	5.8
2025–26	San Miguel	53	17.4	.467	.348	.000	.673	4.2	1.2	.4	.4	6.6
Career		412	20.3	.513	.304	.000	.624	5.0	1.4	.4	.3	8.7

== International career ==
In 2015, Tautuaa joined the Gilas Pilipinas 3.0 training pool as a practice player and went with the entire team to Estonia to participate in a pocket tournament. He also saw action in the 2015 William Jones Cup where Gilas won the silver medal.

He would only be eligible to play for any FIBA sanctioned tournament as an alternate naturalized player since he was not able to secure his Philippine passport before he turned 16 years old.

== Player profile ==
Tautuaa is considered a stretch "five" with ball-handling skills, range, passing abilities as well as someone who can rack up points, rebounds, assists, and blocks. Additionally, he is known for his dunks, putbacks, ability to chase down loose balls, and basketball IQ.

== Personal life ==
Tautuaa's father is Moala Sr. from the Pacific Island nation of Tonga, while his mother is Romanita (née Del Valle), a Filipina, who hails from Taguig. He earned a degree in criminal justice, and can also speak Tagalog. He is often teased with the nickname "Pebbles".
