= Snow Badua =

Filipino sports journalist

1st Commissioner of the MPBL
- In office August 29, 2017 – November 22, 2017
- Succeeded by: Kenneth Duremdes

Personal details
- Born: Edmund Pineda Badua; April 22, 1977 (age 48)

Edmund "Snow" Pineda Badua (born April 22, 1977) is a Filipino sports journalist writing articles for Spin.ph. He is also the founder of "PTV Sports", a nightly sports newscast aired on PTV which served as his home network from March 2006 to January 2015. Badua also served as the first commissioner of the Maharlika Pilipinas Basketball League (MPBL) in 2017. He was succeeded by Kenneth Duremdes before the league's inaugural season began. Starting June 2025, Badua will host Snow Bomb on the Bilyonaryo News Channel.

== Career history ==
In the late 1990s, he was a DJ for 101.5 Big Sound FM Cabanatuan under his on-air name "John Patrick". On March 6, 2006, Badua joined PTV (which is NBN, by the time) and he created what have been the number one sports newscast in the country, NBN Sports. He do multi-tasking skills for the one-hour sports newscast, acts as a head writer, reporter, host, cameraman and editor. He also covered field reports for the NBN News team.

Within the years, the show also joined by co-hosts Saleema Refran, Jasmin Romero, Meg Siozon, Dennis Guillermo, Flor Perez, Dennis Principe, Ycah Montes, Nicole Ramos and Michelle Gavagan with reporters Robert Belen, JP Palileo, Christabel de Leon, Keisha Halili and Arianne Mallare and DZSR reporters Rick Yap Santos, Cecile Quimlat, Judith Caringal, Anne Camua-Vinas and Ria Arevalo and producing segments including Homecourt, Inside I-Sports and I-Sports, which is the interactive portion where hosts reading questions via text, e-mail and social media, and taking calls to the viewers. Several years back, PTV Sports awarded as one of the child-friendly shows by Anak TV.

Due to his "spin-bomb" reports on PTV Sports (then named as Teledyaryo Sports and NBN Sports), he was hired by Spin.ph as their contributing writer in December 2012, his first article was about the decline of offer of Ian Sangalang to become part of the Smart Gilas 2.0. Every now and then, Snow writes articles for the website, majority covering the Philippine Basketball Association and the fights of Manny Pacquiao.

On January 6, 2015, he filed the resignation letter to his home network due to the irresponsible acts against their sports division manager, Alberto Marbella including the giving away cash prizes to his staff on their Christmas party, except Badua, the use of the office's revolving fund for his personal use and his contract with TV5 as consultant for sports coverage, within the mandatory hours of being the sports manager of PTV (gross misconduct). Few weeks after Badua's resignation, Hajji Kaamino later joined Dennis and Meg in the program and Badua continued to posting articles for Spin.ph and PBA.inquirer.net.

In 2016, Badua exposed the alleged fake diploma of PBA marketing consultant Rhose Montreal, originally posted on his website. Montreal on her resume, claimed that she is a cum laude graduate of AB Philosophy in the University of the Philippines Diliman, and adding further in this issue is that Montreal's undergraduate diploma issued in 1994 has no UP seal and the duplicated signature of former UP president Onofre Corpuz. Montreal tendered her resignation as the league's business consultant after a meeting of the PBA Board of Governors on February 24, 2016.

In August 2017, Badua became the first commissioner of the Pacquiao-founded Maharlika Pilipinas Basketball League (MPBL). He would later be succeeded by Kenneth Duremdes in November that same year, before the league's first season kicked off.

In 2025, Badua will host Snow Bomb, a sports-focused program which will air on the Bilyonaryo News Channel starting June 20.

== Controversies ==
During the staging of Stage 13 of Ronda Pilipinas 2012, Badua went on a fistfight on the starting line against V-Mobile cycling coach Arjuna Saulo. The latter accused Badua for being such biased in the reportage, in favor of another squad. It was later the management of Ronda Pilipinas, imposed a ban between Badua and Saulo to participate in the activities of RP, but Badua's ban later withdrawn.

On September 19, 2015, newly appointed PBA commissioner Chito Narvasa imposed an indefinite ban to Badua and refrained him from covering any of the league's activities. Any players and coaches that will be interviewed to him will also be penalized. This was after his "not factual" and "baseless" reportage on Barangay Ginebra San Miguel team manager Alfrancis Chua over the confession of Pacific Xtreme Combat round girl Abby Poblador as the "mistress" of Chua that led into malicious and irresponsible actions on Chua, started on his interview with Mo Twister on his radio program. Supporters of Badua, then tweeted with a hashtag #OneForSnow, in support of Badua himself and protesting against the ban implemented by the newly appointed PBA commissioner.

On his interview on HardBall of ANC, Badua said that he never texted and called Narvasa himself. PBA President and CEO, Chito Salud, supported the decision, but it clarified that it fosters no ill will with mediamen.
