= 2015 PBA draft =

Player selection in Philippine basketball

General information
- Date: August 23, 2015
- Time: 2:00 pm (PHT)
- Location: Robinsons Place Manila
- Network: Sports5 (TV5, Sports5.ph)

Overview
- League: Philippine Basketball Association
- First selection: Moala Tautuaa (Talk 'N Text Tropang Texters)

The 2015 Philippine Basketball Association (PBA) rookie draft was an event which allows teams to draft players from the amateur ranks. The event was held at the Midtown Atrium, Robinsons Place Manila on August 23, 2015. From this draft on, the league abandoned its lottery system after the controversies that surrounded the previous year's draft. Instead, the league determined the drafting order based on the performance of the member teams for the 2014–15 season, with the worst team picking first.

== Draft order ==
The draft order was determined based from the overall performance of the teams from the previous season. The Philippine Cup final ranking comprises 40% of the points, while the rankings of the Commissioner's and Governors' Cups will comprise 30% each.

Draft order	Team	Final ranking			Total
Draft order	Team	PHIL	COM	GOV	Total
1st	Blackwater Elite	12th	12th	12th	12.0
2nd	Mahindra Enforcer	11th	11th	9th	10.4
3rd	NLEX Road Warriors	10th	5th	11th	8.8
4th	GlobalPort Batang Pier	8th	10th	5th	7.7
5th	Barako Bull Energy	9th	7th	6th	7.5
6th	Barangay Ginebra San Miguel	5th	8th	8th	6.8
7th	Meralco Bolts	6th	4th	7th	5.7
8th	Star Hotshots	7th	3rd	4th	4.9
9th	Talk 'N Text Tropang Texters	4th	1st	10th	4.9
10th	San Miguel Beermen	1st	9th	1st	3.4
11th	Alaska Aces	2nd	6th	2nd	3.2
12th	Rain or Shine Elasto Painters	3rd	2nd	3rd	2.7

== Draft ==
PG	Point guard	SG	Shooting guard	SF	Small forward	PF	Power forward	C	Center	*	Mythical team member	^{#}	All-Star

=== 1st round ===
Round	Pick	Player	Pos.	Country of birth*	Team	PBA D-League team	College
1	1	#Moala Tautuaa	C/PF	United States	Talk 'N Text Tropang Texters (from Blackwater) ^{[a]}	Cebuana Lhuillier Gems	Chadron State
1	2	*Troy Rosario	PF/C	Philippines	Mahindra Enforcer	Hapee Fresh Fighters	NU
1	3	#Maverick Ahanmisi	PG/SG	United States	Rain or Shine Elasto Painters (from NLEX) ^{[b]}	Cafe France Bakers	Minnesota
1	4	*Chris Newsome	SG/SF	United States	Meralco Bolts (from GlobalPort) ^{[c]}	Hapee Fresh Fighters	Ateneo
1	5	*Scottie Thompson	SG/PG	Philippines	Barangay Ginebra San Miguel (from Barako Bull) ^{[d]}	Hapee Fresh Fighters	Perpetual Help
1	6	Garvo Lanete	SG	Philippines	NLEX Road Warriors (from Ginebra) ^{[e]}	Hapee Fresh Fighters	San Beda
1	7	#Baser Amer	PG	Philippines	Meralco Bolts	Hapee Fresh Fighters	San Beda
1	8	#Norbert Torres	C/PF	Canada	Star Hotshots	Cebuana Lhuillier Gems	La Salle
1	9	Arthur dela Cruz	SF/PF	Philippines	Blackwater Elite (from Talk 'N Text) ^{[f]}	Hapee Fresh Fighters	San Beda
1	10	#Glenn Khobuntin	SF/PF	Philippines	NLEX Road Warriors (from San Miguel) ^{[g]}	Jumbo Plastic Linoleum Giants	NU
1	11	Kevin Racal	SF	Philippines	Alaska Aces	Hog's Breath Cafe Razorbacks	Letran
1	12	Josan Nimes	SF	Philippines	Rain or Shine Elasto Painters	Cafe France Bakers	Mapúa

=== 2nd round ===
Round	Pick	Player	Pos.	Country of birth*	Team	PBA D-League team	College
2	1	#Almond Vosotros	PG/SG	Philippines	Blackwater Elite	Cebuana Lhuillier Gems	La Salle
2	2	#Bradwyn Guinto	C	Philippines	Mahindra Enforcer	Cebuana Lhuillier Gems	SSC-R
2	3	#Don Trollano	SF	Philippines	Rain or Shine Elasto Painters (from NLEX) ^{[h]}	Cagayan Rising Suns	Adamson
2	4	Aljon Mariano	SF/PF	Philippines	Barangay Ginebra San Miguel (from GlobalPort via Barako Bull) ^{[i]}	Tanduay Light Rhum Masters	UST
2	5	Simon Enciso	PG/SG	Philippines	Rain or Shine Elasto Painters (from Barako Bull and GlobalPort) ^{[j]}	Cebuana Lhuillier Gems	Notre Dame de Namur
2	6	Marion Magat	C	Philippines	Alaska Aces (from Ginebra) ^{[k]}	Jumbo Plastic Linoleum Giants	NU
2	7	Kris Rosales	PG	United States	Barako Bull Energy (from Star) ^{[l]}	Jumbo Plastic Linoleum Giants	Hope International
2	8	Jaypee Mendoza	SF	Philippines	Alaska Aces (from Talk 'N Text) ^{[m]}	Hapee Fresh Fighters	San Beda
2	9	Michael Miranda	C	Philippines	Barako Bull Energy (from San Miguel) ^{[n]}	Wang's Basketball Couriers	San Sebastian
2	10	Abel Galliguez	PG	United States	Alaska Aces	Cagayan Rising Suns	John Brown

(Rain or Shine passed. Their first of two unused picks originally belonged to Meralco.^{[o]})

=== 3rd round ===
Round	Pick	Player	Pos.	Country of birth*	Team	PBA D-League team	College
3	1	Jason Melano	PF/SF	Philippines	Blackwater Elite	Cagayan Rising Suns	St. Francis of Assisi
3	2	Leo de Vera	SF/PF	United States	Mahindra Enforcer	Tanduay Light Rhum Masters	SSC-R
3	3	Jansen Rios	SF	Philippines	NLEX Road Warriors	LiverMarin Guardians	Adamson
3	4	Roi Sumang	PG	Philippines	GlobalPort Batang Pier	Tanduay Light Rhum Masters	UE
3	5	Yutien Andrada	C	Philippines	Barako Bull Energy	Café France Bakers	La Salle
3	6	Dennice Villamor	PF/SF	Philippines	Barangay Ginebra San Miguel	Jumbo Plastic Linoleum Giants	NU
3	7	Joseph Sedurifa	SG	Philippines	Meralco Bolts	Café France Bakers	CEU
3	8	Mark Cruz	PG	Philippines	Star Hotshots	Jumbo Plastic Linoleum Giants	Letran
3	9	Michole Sorela	PF/C	Philippines	Talk 'N Text Tropang Texters	Hapee Fresh Fighters	San Beda
3	10	Michael Mabulac	PF/C	Philippines	San Miguel Beermen	Cagayan Rising Suns	JRU
3	11	Nico Elorde	PG	Philippines	Alaska Aces	Hapee Fresh Fighters	Ateneo

=== 4th round ===
Round	Pick	Player	Pos.	Country of birth*	Team	PBA D-League team	College
4	1	Keith Agovida	SF	Philippines	Blackwater Elite	KeraMix Mixers	Arellano
4	2	Michael DiGregorio	SG	United States	Mahindra Enforcer	KeraMix Mixers	McKendree
4	3	Jerramy King	SG/PG	United States	NLEX Road Warriors	AMA Computer University Titans	Cal State Long Beach
4	4	Ryan Wetherell	SG/SF	United States	GlobalPort Batang Pier	none	Southern California
4	5	John Ray Alabanza	PF/C	Philippines	Barako Bull Energy	MJM M-Builders	UE
4	6	Samboy de Leon	SF	Philippines	Star Hotshots	Cafe France Bakers	CEU
4	7	Joshua Cubillo	SG	United States	Talk 'N Text Tropang Texters	AMA University	Cal State Fullerton
4	8	Andretti Stevens	PG	Philippines	San Miguel Beermen	Erase XFoliant Erasers	Mapúa
4	9	Robin Roño	PG	Philippines	Alaska Aces	Tanduay Light Rhum Masters	NU

(Ginebra and Meralco passed.)

=== 5th round ===
Round	Pick	Player	Pos.	Country of birth*	Team	PBA D-League team	College
5	1	Jawhar Purdy	SG/PG	United States	Blackwater Elite	Wang's Basketball Couriers	Cal State Stanislaus
5	2	Alexander Austria	PG	United States	Mahindra Enforcer	Cagayan Rising Suns	San Francisco State
5	3	Alfred Batino	C/PF	Philippines	NLEX Road Warriors	Cafe France Bakers	CEU
5	4	Bong Galanza	SG	Philippines	GlobalPort Batang Pier	Cafe France Bakers	UE
5	5	Emilian Vargas	SG	Philippines	Talk 'N Text Tropang Texters	None	St. Claire of Caloocan

(Barako Bull, Star, San Miguel, Alaska passed.)

=== 6th round ===
Round	Pick	Player	Pos.	Country of birth*	Team	PBA D-League team	College
6	1	Christian Palma	SF/SG	Philippines	Blackwater Elite	Cagayan Rising Suns	Arellano
6	2	Roberto Hainga	C/PF	Philippines	Mahindra Enforcer	MP Hotel Warriors	UST
6	3	Edgar Tanuan, Jr.	SF	Philippines	NLEX Road Warriors	None	FEU

(GlobalPort and Talk 'N Text passed.)

=== 7th round ===
Round	Pick	Player	Pos.	Country of birth*	Team	PBA D-League team	College
7	1	Alvin Abundo	PG	Philippines	Blackwater Elite	Café France Bakers	CEU
7	2	Michael Abad	C/PF	Philippines	Mahindra Enforcer	LiverMarin Guardians	Mapúa
7	3	Arvin Vitug	PG	Philippines	NLEX Road Warriors	EA Regen Meds	SSC-R

=== 8th round ===
Round	Pick	Player	Pos.	Country of birth*	Team	PBA D-League team	College
8	1	Randy Dilay	SG	United States	Blackwater Elite	Tanduay Light Rhum Masters	Dominican U

(Mahindra and NLEX passed.)

== Trades involving draft picks ==
=== Pre-draft trades ===
- ^{a} On October 9, 2014, Talk 'N Text acquired a first round pick from Blackwater in a three-team trade with NLEX.
- ^{b} On October 4, 2014, Rain or Shine acquired a 2015 first round pick from NLEX in exchange for the draft rights to Kevin Alas.
- ^{c} On January 31, 2013, Meralco acquired a 2015 first round pick, Rey Guevarra, Vic Manuel, and Josh Vanlandingham from GlobalPort in exchange for Sol Mercado, Kelly Nabong, Jaypee Belencion, and Yousif Aljamal.
- ^{d} On March 31, 2015, Ginebra acquired a first round pick from Barako Bull in exchange for James Forrester and Dylan Ababou.
- ^{e} On July 25, 2014, NLEX acquired a 2015 first round pick from Ginebra in exchange for Joseph Yeo.
- ^{f} On October 9, 2014, Blackwater acquired Larry Rodriguez and a first round pick from Talk 'N Text in a three-team trade with NLEX.
- ^{g} On July 25, 2014, NLEX acquired a 2015 first round pick from San Miguel in exchange for a 2016 first round pick.
- ^{h}
- ^{i} On February 3, 2015, Ginebra acquired a second round pick and Dorian Peña from Barako Bull in a three-team trade with San Miguel. Previously, the Energy acquired the pick and RR Garcia on June 24, 2014, from GlobalPort in exchange for Keith Jensen.
- ^{j} On August 18, 2015, Rain or Shine acquired a second round pick and Jewel Ponferada from GlobalPort in exchange for Jervy Cruz. Previously, the Batang Pier acquired the pick and Ronjay Buenafe on June 4, 2014, from Barako Bull in exchange for Nico Salva and Bonbon Custodio.
- ^{k} On August 31, 2012, Alaska acquired JVee Casio and a 2015 second round pick from Ginebra in exchange for LA Tenorio in a five-team trade with Barako Bull, GlobalPort, and Petron (San Miguel).
- ^{l} On September 6, 2011, Barako Bull acquired a second round pick and Don Allado from Star (as B-Meg) in a three-team trade with Shopinas.com/Air21 (NLEX).
- ^{m} On November 3, 2013, Alaska acquired a 2015 second round pick from Talk 'N Text in exchange for the draft rights to John Paul Erram (see 2013 PBA draft).
- ^{n} On December 10, 2014, San Miguel acquired Dennis Miranda and a 2015 second round pick from Barako Bull in exchange for Sol Mercado.
- ^{o} On August 19, 2012, Rain or Shine acquired a 2015 second round pick from Meralco in exchange for the draft rights to Kelly Nabong.

=== Draft-day trades ===
Note: No trades were allowed during the draft day as requested by incoming commissioner Chito Narvasa.

== Undrafted players ==
Name	College	PBA D-League team
Eric Acuña	St. Clare	
Alex Almario	JRU	Jumbo Plastic
Junar Arce	PCU	
Carlo Gatmaitan	St. Claire	
Jonathan Grey*	CSB	
Dale Hodges	U of Canberra	
Jul-Ashri Ignacio	NU	Livermarin
Eric Miraflores	UE	Wang's
Mark Montuano	Informatics	Wang's
Adrian Santos	UE	Tanduay

Note: *Backed out due to not playing in the PBA D-League; eventually drafted in 2016 by Meralco.
