= 2015–16 San Miguel Beermen season =

- Head coach: Leo Austria
- Owner(s): San Miguel Brewery, Inc. (a San Miguel Corporation subsidiary)

Philippine Cup results
- Record: 9–2 (81.8%)
- Place: 2nd
- Playoff finish: Champions (Defeated Alaska, 4–3)

Commissioner's Cup results
- Record: 8–3 (72.7%)
- Place: 1st
- Playoff finish: Semifinalist (lost to Rain or Shine, 1–3)

Governors' Cup results
- Record: 8–3 (72.7%)
- Place: 2nd
- Playoff finish: Semifinalist (lost to Barangay Ginebra, 2–3)

San Miguel Beermen seasons

The 2015–16 San Miguel Beermen season was the 41st season of the franchise in the Philippine Basketball Association (PBA).

== Key dates ==
- August 23: The 2015 PBA draft took place at Midtown Atrium, Robinson Place Manila.

== Draft picks ==
Round	Pick	Player	Position	Nationality	PBA D-League team	College
3	32	Michael Mabulac	PF	Philippines	Cagayan Rising Suns	SSC-R
4	41	Andretti Stevens	SG	Philippines	Erase Xfoliant Erasers	Mapúa

== Roster ==
2015–16 San Miguel Beermen roster
Players
Coaches

Pos.	#	POB	Name	Height	Weight	DOB (YYYY–MM–DD)	From
G	1	(Philippines)	Brian Heruela	5 ft 10 in (1.78 m)	195 lb (88 kg)	1989–04–13	Cebu
G/F	3	(United States)	Chris Lutz	6 ft 3 in (1.91 m)	215 lb (98 kg)	1985–02–11	Marshall
F/C	4	(Philippines)	Jay-R Reyes	6 ft 7 in (2.01 m)	225 lb (102 kg)	1984–07–16	UP Diliman
G	5	(Philippines)	Alex Cabagnot	6 ft 0 in (1.83 m)	185 lb (84 kg)	1982–12–08	Hawaiʻi–Hilo
G	6	(United States)	Chris Ross	6 ft 1 in (1.85 m)	180 lb (82 kg)	1985–03–08	Marshall
G/F	13	(United States)	Marcio Lassiter	6 ft 2 in (1.88 m)	185 lb (84 kg)	1987–05–16	Cal State Fullerton
C	15	(Philippines)	June Mar Fajardo	6 ft 11 in (2.11 m)	268 lb (122 kg)	1989–11–17	Cebu
G	18	(Philippines)	Ryan Araña	6 ft 1 in (1.85 m)	180 lb (82 kg)	1983–03–23	De La Salle
G	20	(Philippines)	Gary David	6 ft 1 in (1.85 m)	180 lb (82 kg)	1978–07–13	Lyceum
F	27	(Philippines)	Gabby Espinas	6 ft 4 in (1.93 m)	208 lb (94 kg)	1982–01–03	Philippine Christian
F	28	(Philippines)	Michael Mabulac (R)	6 ft 4 in (1.93 m)	218 lb (99 kg)	1991–10–31	José Rizal
F	29	(Philippines)	Arwind Santos (C)	6 ft 4 in (1.93 m)	175 lb (79 kg)	1981–06–10	Far Eastern
F	33	(Australia)	David Semerad	6 ft 4 in (1.93 m)	220 lb (100 kg)	1991–04–25	San Beda
G/F	71	(Philippines)	Ronald Tubid	6 ft 1 in (1.85 m)	185 lb (84 kg)	1981–10–15	UE
C	95	(Philippines)	Yancy de Ocampo	6 ft 8 in (2.03 m)	245 lb (111 kg)	1980–03–11	Saint Francis of Assisi

Head coach

- (Philippines) Leo Austria

Assistant coach(es)

- (Philippines) Peter Martin (1st Assistant)
- (Philippines) Biboy Ravanes
- (Philippines) Dayong Mendoza
- (Philippines) Boyzie Zamar
- (Philippines) Renato Agustin
- (Philippines) Jorge Gallent

Team manager

- (Philippines) Gelacio Abanilla
- (Philippines) Daniel Henares (Assistant)

Legend

- (C) Team captain
- (CI) Commissioner's Cup Import
- (GI) Governors' Cup Import
- (EI) EASL Import
- (DP) Unsigned draft pick
- (FA) Free agent
- (IN) Inactive
- (S) Suspended
- (R) Rookie
- Injured

Roster

== Philippine Cup ==
=== Transactions ===
==== Trades ====
August 25, 2015	To Barako Bull Jeric Fortuna	To San Miguel Brian Heruela

September 24, 2015	To Barako Bull Ronald Pascual (from San Miguel)	To Rain or Shine 2016 2nd round pick (from Barako Bull)	To San Miguel Ryan Araña (from Rain or Shine via Barako Bull)

==== Activation ====
November 10, 2015	Activated Michael Mabulac (rookie)	Relegated to Team's Injured/Reserved list David Semerad

=== Eliminations ===
==== Standings ====
Pos	Team	W	L	PCT	GB	Qualification
1	Alaska Aces	9	2	.818 (Note: Head-to-head record: Alaska 1–0 San Miguel)	—	Advance to semifinals
2	San Miguel Beermen	9	2	.818	—	Advance to semifinals
3	Rain or Shine Elasto Painters	8	3	.727	1	Twice-to-beat in the quarterfinals
4	Barangay Ginebra San Miguel	7	4	.636 (Note: Head-to-head record: Barangay Ginebra 1–0 GlobalPort)	2	Twice-to-beat in the quarterfinals
5	GlobalPort Batang Pier	7	4	.636	2	Twice-to-beat in the quarterfinals
6	TNT Tropang Texters	6	5	.545	3	Twice-to-beat in the quarterfinals
7	NLEX Road Warriors	5	6	.455 (Note: Head-to-head record: NLEX 1–0 Barako Bull)	4	Twice-to-win in the quarterfinals
8	Barako Bull Energy	5	6	.455	4	Twice-to-win in the quarterfinals
9	Star Hotshots	4	7	.364	5	Twice-to-win in the quarterfinals
10	Blackwater Elite	3	8	.273	6	Twice-to-win in the quarterfinals
11	Mahindra Enforcer	2	9	.182	7	
12	Meralco Bolts	1	10	.091	8	

Source: PBA.ph

==== Game log ====
2015–16 PBA Philippine Cup game log
Total: 9–2
October: 2–0

Game	Date	Opponent	Score	High points	High rebounds	High assists	Location Attendance	Record
1	October 24	GlobalPort	W 97–86	June Mar Fajardo (21)	June Mar Fajardo (17)	Alex Cabagnot (8)	University of Southeastern Philippines Gym	1–0
2	October 28	Meralco	W 101–85	Alex Cabagnot (18)	June Mar Fajardo (12)	Marcio Lassiter (5)	Smart Araneta Coliseum	2–0

November : 4–1

Game	Date	Opponent	Score	High points	High rebounds	High assists	Location Attendance	Record
3	November 4	Rain or Shine	L 84–99	Alex Cabagnot (16)	June Mar Fajardo (10)	Alex Cabagnot (4)	Mall of Asia Arena	2–1
4	November 11	Blackwater	W 93–83	Fajardo, Lassiter (20)	June Mar Fajardo (13)	Marcio Lassiter (5)	Philsports Arena	3–1
5	November 15	Ginebra	W 100–82	Arwind Santos (24)	June Mar Fajardo (14)	Chris Ross (8)	Philsports Arena	4–1
6	November 22	Barako Bull	W 106–105	June Mar Fajardo (28)	June Mar Fajardo (20)	Alex Cabagnot (8)	Ynares Center	5–1
7	November 28	Star	W 101–90	June Mar Fajardo (27)	June Mar Fajardo (16)	Alex Cabagnot (5)	Mall of Asia Arena	6–1

December : 3–1

Game	Date	Opponent	Score	High points	High rebounds	High assists	Location Attendance	Record
8	December 2	Mahindra	W 102–86	June Mar Fajardo (35)	June Mar Fajardo (12)	Brian Heruela (5)	Smart Araneta Coliseum	7–1
9	December 9	NLEX	W 88–80 (OT)	Cabagnot, de Ocampo (17)	Yancy de Ocampo (12)	Heruela, Ross (4)	Cuneta Astrodome	8–1
10	December 12	TNT	W 97–84	Arwind Santos (30)	June Mar Fajardo (15)	Alex Cabagnot (6)	Smart Araneta Coliseum	9–1
11	December 16	Alaska	L 97–103	June Mar Fajardo (43)	June Mar Fajardo (20)	Cabagnot, Lutz (5)	Smart Araneta Coliseum	9–2

2015–16 schedule

=== Playoffs ===
==== Bracket ====
Quarterfinals (1st phase)
(#3 twice to beat)
3	Rain or Shine	95
10	Blackwater	90
(#6 twice to beat)
6	TNT	90
7	NLEX	88
(#4 twice to beat)
4	Barangay Ginebra	92*
9	Star	89
(#5 twice to beat)
5	GlobalPort	94
8	Barako Bull	85

Quarterfinals (2nd phase) (single elimination)
3	Rain or Shine	104
6	TNT	89
4	Barangay Ginebra	83
5	GlobalPort	84*

Semifinals (best-of-7)
2	San Miguel	4
3	Rain or Shine	2
1	Alaska	4
5	GlobalPort	1

Finals (best-of-7)
2	San Miguel	4
1	Alaska	3

*Game went into overtime

==== Game log ====
2015–16 PBA Philippine Cup playoffs game log
Total: 8–5
Semifinals: 4–2

Game	Date	Opponent	Score	High points	High rebounds	High assists	Location Attendance	Series
1	January 5	Rain or Shine	W 109–105	June Mar Fajardo (36)	June Mar Fajardo (18)	Arwind Santos (5)	Mall of Asia Arena	1–0
2	January 7	Rain or Shine	L 97–105	June Mar Fajardo (38)	June Mar Fajardo (17)	Marcio Lassiter (4)	Smart Araneta Coliseum	1–1
3	January 9	Rain or Shine	L 106–111	June Mar Fajardo (40)	June Mar Fajardo (20)	Alex Cabagnot (6)	Smart Araneta Coliseum	1–2
4	January 11	Rain or Shine	W 105–92	June Mar Fajardo (33)	June Mar Fajardo (15)	Fajardo, Lassiter, Ross (3)	Smart Araneta Coliseum	2–2
5	January 13	Rain or Shine	W 103–94	June Mar Fajardo (27)	June Mar Fajardo (12)	Alex Cabagnot (6)	Smart Araneta Coliseum	3–2
6	January 15	Rain or Shine	W 90–82	Marcio Lassiter (22)	Arwind Santos (19)	Chris Ross (6)	Smart Araneta Coliseum	4–2

Finals: 4–3

Game	Date	Opponent	Score	High points	High rebounds	High assists	Location Attendance	Series
1	January 17	Alaska	L 91–100	Alex Cabagnot (20)	Gabby Espinas (8)	Cabagnot, Ross (4)	Smart Araneta Coliseum	0–1
2	January 19	Alaska	L 80–83	Alex Cabagnot (23)	Yancy de Ocampo (14)	Marcio Lassiter (3)	Smart Araneta Coliseum	0–2
3	January 22	Alaska	L 75–82	Jay-R Reyes (13)	Arwind Santos (9)	Alex Cabagnot (5)	Quezon Convention Center	0–3
4	January 24	Alaska	W 110–104 (OT)	Marcio Lassiter (26)	Gabby Espinas (14)	Chris Ross (9)	PhilSports Arena	1–3
5	January 27	Alaska	W 86–73 (OT)	Arwind Santos (22)	Arwind Santos (16)	Chris Ross (7)	Smart Araneta Coliseum	2–3
6	January 29	Alaska	W 100–89	Marcio Lassiter (26)	Arwind Santos (15)	de Ocampo, Lutz, Ross (3)	Smart Araneta Coliseum; 12,626	3–3
7	February 3	Alaska	W 96–89	Fajardo, Ross (21)	June Mar Fajardo (15)	Cabagnot, Ross (5)	Mall of Asia Arena; 23,616	4–3

2015–16 schedule

== Commissioner's Cup ==
=== Transactions ===
==== Signings ====
===== Local player =====
Player	Pos	Signed	Contract Amount	Contract Length	Former Team	Ref
(Philippines) Gary David	SG	April 7	2 M	6 mos.	Meralco	

===== Import =====
Name	Country	Number	Debuted	Last game	Record
Tyler Wilkerson	(United States)	32	February 20 (vs. Mahindra)	April 26 (vs. Rain or Shine)	9–6
Arizona Reid	(United States)	32	May 1 (vs. Rain or Shine)	May 1 (vs. Rain or Shine)	0–1

==== Activation ====
March 1, 2016	Activated Michael Mabulac	Relegated to Team's Injured/Reserved list Ronald Tubid

April 1, 2016	Ronald Tubid	Nelbert Omolon

April 8, 2016	Gary David	Michael Mabulac

==== Free Agency ====
April 8, 2016	Dropped to the team's Unrestricted free agent list Nelbert Omolon

=== Eliminations ===
==== Standings ====
Pos	Team	W	L	PCT	GB	Qualification
1	San Miguel Beermen	8	3	.727 (Note: Head-to-head record: San Miguel 1–0 Meralco)	—	Twice-to-beat in the quarterfinals
2	Meralco Bolts	8	3	.727	—	Twice-to-beat in the quarterfinals
3	Alaska Aces	7	4	.636 (Note: Head-to-head quotient: Alaska 1.18, Barangay Ginebra 1.03, Rain or Shine 0.84)	1	Best-of-three quarterfinals
4	Barangay Ginebra San Miguel	7	4	.636	1	Best-of-three quarterfinals
5	Rain or Shine Elasto Painters	7	4	.636	1	Best-of-three quarterfinals
6	Tropang TNT	6	5	.545	2	Best-of-three quarterfinals
7	NLEX Road Warriors	5	6	.455 (Note: Head-to-head record: NLEX 1–0 Star)	3	Twice-to-win in the quarterfinals
8	Star Hotshots	5	6	.455	3	Twice-to-win in the quarterfinals
9	Mahindra Enforcer	4	7	.364	4	
10	Blackwater Elite	3	8	.273 (Note: Head-to-head quotient: Blackwater 1.04, Phoenix 0.99, GlobalPort 0.98)	5	
11	Phoenix Fuel Masters	3	8	.273	5	
12	GlobalPort Batang Pier	3	8	.273	5	

Source: PBA.ph

==== Game log ====
2016 PBA Commissioner's Cup game log
Total: 8–3
February: 1–1

Game	Date	Opponent	Score	High points	High rebounds	High assists	Location Attendance	Record
1	February 20	Mahindra	L 96–102	Tyler Wilkerson (29)	Tyler Wilkerson (12)	Chris Ross (6)	Alonte Sports Arena	0–1
2	February 26	GlobalPort	W 120–109	Tyler Wilkerson (52)	Tyler Wilkerson (11)	Chris Ross (9)	Smart Araneta Coliseum	1–1

March : 4–1

Game	Date	Opponent	Score	High points	High rebounds	High assists	Location Attendance	Record
3	March 2	Blackwater	W 108–96	Tyler Wilkerson (35)	Tyler Wilkerson (17)	Lassiter, Santos (3)	Ynares Center	2–1
4	March 5	Meralco	W 94–86	Tyler Wilkerson (27)	June Mar Fajardo (16)	Alex Cabagnot (4)	Ibalong Centrum for Recreation	3–1
5	March 11	Rain or Shine	L 105–108	Tyler Wilkerson (33)	Tyler Wilkerson (10)	Chris Ross (5)	Smart Araneta Coliseum	3–2
6	March 16	Alaska	W 116–96	Tyler Wilkerson (32)	Tyler Wilkerson (14)	Chris Ross (12)	Smart Araneta Coliseum	4–2
7	March 27	Star	W 117–98	Tyler Wilkerson (44)	Tyler Wilkerson (17)	Chris Ross (10)	Smart Araneta Coliseum	5–2

April : 3–1

Game	Date	Opponent	Score	High points	High rebounds	High assists	Location Attendance	Record
8	April 3	Ginebra	L 84–110	Tyler Wilkerson (20)	Tyler Wilkerson (16)	Chris Ross (5)	Smart Araneta Coliseum	5–3
9	April 5	NLEX	W 131–127 (3OT)	Tyler Wilkerson (58)	June Mar Fajardo (16)	Alex Cabagnot (12)	Smart Araneta Coliseum	6–3
10	April 10	Phoenix	W 121–109	Tyler Wilkerson (40)	Tyler Wilkerson (19)	Chris Ross (12)	Smart Araneta Coliseum	7–3
11	April 15	TNT	W 104–98	Tyler Wilkerson (36)	Tyler Wilkerson (15)	Chris Ross (8)	Smart Araneta Coliseum	8–3

2015–16 schedule

=== Playoffs ===
==== Bracket ====
Quarterfinals
(#1 twice-to-beat)
1	San Miguel	99	103
8	Star	108	99
(best-of-3)
4	Barangay Ginebra	0
5	Rain or Shine	2
(#2 twice-to-beat)
2	Meralco	104
7	NLEX	97
(best-of-3)
3	Alaska	2
6	TNT	1

Semifinals (best-of-5)
1	San Miguel	1
5	Rain or Shine	3
2	Meralco	2
3	Alaska	3

Finals (best-of-7)
5	Rain or Shine	4
3	Alaska	2

==== Game log ====
2016 PBA Commissioner's Cup playoffs game log
Total: 2–4
Quarterfinals: 1–1

Game	Date	Opponent	Score	High points	High rebounds	High assists	Location Attendance	Series
1	April 18	Star	L 99–108	June Mar Fajardo (24)	Tyler Wilkerson (14)	Alex Cabagnot (5)	Smart Araneta Coliseum	0–1
2	April 20	Star	W 103–99	Tyler Wilkerson (46)	Tyler Wilkerson (17)	Chris Ross (5)	Smart Araneta Coliseum	1–1

Semifinals: 1–3

Game	Date	Opponent	Score	High points	High rebounds	High assists	Location Attendance	Series
1	April 24	Rain or Shine	L 94–98	Tyler Wilkerson (40)	June Mar Fajardo (13)	Arwind Santos (4)	Smart Araneta Coliseum	0–1
2	April 26	Rain or Shine	L 96–98	Tyler Wilkerson (35)	Tyler Wilkerson (18)	Chris Ross (7)	Smart Araneta Coliseum	0–2
3	April 28	Rain or Shine	W 104–98	Marcio Lassiter (30)	June Mar Fajardo (9)	Chris Ross (12)	PhilSports Arena	1–2
4	May 1	Rain or Shine	L 99–124	Arizona Reid (25)	Arizona Reid (17)	Alex Cabagnot (8)	Smart Araneta Coliseum	1–3

2015–16 schedule

== Governors' Cup ==
=== Transactions ===
==== Signings ====
===== Import =====
Name	Country	Number	Debuted	Last game	Record
Arizona Reid	(United States)	32	July 17 (vs. Phoenix)	August 19 (vs. GlobalPort)	4–2
Mike Singletary	(United States)	7	August 31 (vs. Meralco)	September 10 (vs. Rain or Shine)	2–1
Elijah Millsap	(United States)	7	September 18 (vs. Blackwater)	October 4 (vs. Barangay Ginebra)	4–3
Mahmoud Abdeen	(Jordan)	0	September 3 (vs. TNT)	September 21 (vs. Blackwater)	2–1

=== Eliminations ===
==== Standings ====
Pos	Team	W	L	PCT	GB	Qualification
1	TNT KaTropa	10	1	.909	—	Twice-to-beat in the quarterfinals
2	San Miguel Beermen	8	3	.727 (Note: Head-to-head record: Barangay Ginebra 1–0 San Miguel)	2	Twice-to-beat in the quarterfinals
3	Barangay Ginebra San Miguel	8	3	.727	2	Twice-to-beat in the quarterfinals
4	Meralco Bolts	6	5	.545 (Note: Head-to-head quotient: Meralco 1.039, Mahindra 1.017, Alaska 0.950; fourth seed playoff: Meralco 104–99 Mahindra)	4	Twice-to-beat in the quarterfinals
5	Mahindra Enforcer	6	5	.545	4	Twice-to-win in the quarterfinals
6	Alaska Aces	6	5	.545	4	Twice-to-win in the quarterfinals
7	NLEX Road Warriors	5	6	.455 (Note: Head-to-head quotient: NLEX 1.04, Rain or Shine 1.03, Phoenix 0.93; eighth seed playoff: Phoenix 105–94 Rain or Shine)	5	Twice-to-win in the quarterfinals
8	Phoenix Fuel Masters	5	6	.455	5	Twice-to-win in the quarterfinals
9	Rain or Shine Elasto Painters	5	6	.455	5	
10	GlobalPort Batang Pier	4	7	.364	6	
11	Star Hotshots	2	9	.182	8	
12	Blackwater Elite	1	10	.091	9	

Source: PBA.ph

==== Game log ====
2016 PBA Governors' Cup game log
Total: 8–3
July: 3–1

Game	Date	Opponent	Score	High points	High rebounds	High assists	Location Attendance	Record
1	July 17	Phoenix	W 124–113	Arizona Reid (41)	June Mar Fajardo (11)	Marcio Lassiter (6)	Smart Araneta Coliseum	1–0
2	July 22	NLEX	W 94–93	Arizona Reid (23)	Arizona Reid (11)	Chris Ross (6)	Smart Araneta Coliseum	2–0
3	July 27	Mahindra	L 103–105	Arizona Reid (43)	Arizona Reid (11)	Alex Cabagnot (5)	Smart Araneta Coliseum	2–1
4	July 31	Star	W 109–100	Arizona Reid (34)	June Mar Fajardo (13)	Arizona Reid (11)	Smart Araneta Coliseum	3–1

August : 3–1

Game	Date	Opponent	Score	High points	High rebounds	High assists	Location Attendance	Record
5	August 14	Ginebra	W 111–105 (2OT)	Arizona Reid (26)	June Mar Fajardo (17)	Reid, Ross (5)	Mall of Asia Arena; 12,423	4–1
6	August 19	GlobalPort	L 92–98	Arizona Reid (41)	Arizona Reid (15)	Marcio Lassiter (5)	Ynares Center	4–2
7	August 24	Alaska	W 106–103	June Mar Fajardo (37)	June Mar Fajardo (14)	Chris Ross (9)	Smart Araneta Coliseum	5–2
8	August 31	Meralco	W 110–106	June Mar Fajardo (24)	Mike Singletary (20)	Chris Ross (6)	Smart Araneta Coliseum	6–2

September: 2–1

Game	Date	Opponent	Score	High points	High rebounds	High assists	Location Attendance	Record
9	September 3	TNT	L 85–105	June Mar Fajardo (20)	June Mar Fajardo (13)	Marcio Lassiter (4)	Batangas City Coliseum	6–3
10	September 10	Rain or Shine	W 82–75	Mike Singletary (23)	Fajardo, Singletary (12)	Mike Singletary (4)	Mall of Asia Arena	7–3
11	September 18	Blackwater	W 107–101	Elijah Millsap (25)	Elijah Millsap (14)	Chris Ross (6)	Alonte Sports Arena	8–3

2015–16 schedule

=== Playoffs ===
==== Bracket ====
Quarterfinals
(#1 twice to beat)
1	TNT	136
8	Phoenix	124
(#4 twice to beat)
4	Meralco	105
5	Mahindra	82
(#2 twice to beat)
2	San Miguel	114
7	NLEX	110
(#3 twice to beat)
3	Barangay Ginebra	109
6	Alaska	104

Semifinals (Best-of-5)
1	TNT	1
4	Meralco	3
2	San Miguel	2
3	Barangay Ginebra	3

Finals (Best-of-7)
4	Meralco	2
3	Barangay Ginebra	4

==== Game log ====
2016 PBA Governors' Cup playoffs game log
Total: 3–3
Quarterfinals: 1–0

Game	Date	Opponent	Score	High points	High rebounds	High assists	Location Attendance	Series
1	September 22	NLEX	W 114–110	Elijah Millsap (39)	June Mar Fajardo (13)	June Mar Fajardo (5)	Smart Araneta Coliseum	1–0

Semifinals: 2–3

Game	Date	Opponent	Score	High points	High rebounds	High assists	Location Attendance	Series
1	September 26	Ginebra	L 108–115	Elijah Millsap (29)	June Mar Fajardo (15)	Elijah Millsap (11)	Smart Araneta Coliseum	0–1
2	September 28	Ginebra	W 95–92	Elijah Millsap (25)	June Mar Fajardo (23)	Alex Cabagnot (8)	Smart Araneta Coliseum	1–1
3	September 30	Ginebra	L 96–97	Elijah Millsap (24)	Fajardo, Millsap (12)	Alex Cabagnot (6)	Smart Araneta Coliseum	1–2
4	October 2	Ginebra	W 101–72	Marcio Lassiter (25)	Elijah Millsap (17)	Chris Ross (5)	Smart Araneta Coliseum; 22,196	2–2
5	October 4	Ginebra	L 92–117	Arwind Santos (24)	June Mar Fajardo (12)	Alex Cabagnot (6)	Smart Araneta Coliseum; 20,374	2–3

2015–16 schedule

== Statistics ==
Legend
GP	Games played	GS	Games started	MPG	Minutes per game
FGM	Field-goal made	FGA	Field-goal attempts	FG%	Field-goal percentage
3PM	3-point field-goal made	3PA	3-point field-goal attempts	3P%	3-point field-goal percentage
FTM	Free-throw made	FTA	Free-throw attempts	FT%	Free-throw percentage
RPG	Rebounds per game	APG	Assists per game	SPG	Steals per game
BPG	Blocks per game	TOT	Turnovers per game	PPG	Points per game

=== Philippine Cup ===
Player	GP	GS	MPG	FGM	FGA	FG%	3PM	3PA	3FG%	FTM	FTA	FT%	RPG	APG	SPG	BPG	TOT	PPG
Brian Heruela	17	0	8.5	14	45	.311	3	12	.250	7	12	.583	1.28	1.17	0.67	0.00	0.72	2.11
Chris Lutz	24	15	18.8	51	97	.526	4	13	.308	5	12	.417	1.88	1.46	0.21	0.00	0.96	4.62
Jay-R Reyes	19	1	7.5	16	43	.372	2	5	.400	12	20	.600	2.26	0.16	0.16	0.26	0.63	2.42
Alex Cabagnot	24	22	31.8	115	301	.382	37	129	.287	63	86	.733	3.42	4.04	1.12	0.08	1.50	13.75
Chris Ross	24	8	24.3	50	146	.342	12	51	.235	34	46	.739	3.29	3.88	1.67	0.38	1.92	6.08
Marcio Lassiter	22	10	30.6	101	246	.411	46	121	.380	50	60	.833	4.45	2.05	1.00	0.50	2.32	13.55
June Mar Fajardo	20	17	34.8	185	319	.580	0	2	.000	122	183	.667	13.90	1.50	0.60	1.90	3.95	24.60
Ryan Araña	23	2	11.8	26	72	.361	4	16	.250	5	11	.455	2.39	1.04	0.17	0.04	1.09	2.65
Nelbert Omolon	7	0	5.29	4	10	.400	0	0	.000	0	1	.000	0.71	0.00	0.14	0.00	0.71	1.14
Gabby Espinas	23	2	15.8	58	110	.527	3	6	.500	38	60	.633	4.35	0.43	0.22	0.35	1.30	6.83
Michael Mabulac	2	0	2.3	0	2	.000	0	0	.000	1	2	.500	1.00	0.00	0.00	0.00	1.00	0.50
Arwind Santos	24	24	35.6	126	356	.354	49	183	.268	35	43	.814	9.42	2.08	1.08	1.83	2.29	14.00
David Semerad	2	0	2.50	0	0	.000	0	0	.000	0	0	.000	0.00	0.00	0.00	0.00	0.50	0.00
Ronald Tubid	24	15	23.9	65	174	.374	29	102	.284	34	44	.773	3.92	0.75	0.33	0.12	1.12	8.04
Yancy de Ocampo	20	4	12.5	32	73	.438	8	19	.421	25	30	.833	4.10	0.95	0.10	0.35	1.00	4.85

=== Commissioner's Cup ===
Player	GP	GS	MPG	FGM	FGA	FG%	3PM	3PA	3FG%	FTM	FTA	FT%	RPG	APG	SPG	BPG	TOT	PPG
Brian Heruela	9	0	6.4	5	17	.294	1	8	.125	2	2	1.000	0.89	1.00	0.33	0.00	0.67	1.44
Chris Lutz	11	1	9.6	5	19	.263	0	0	.000	2	3	.667	0.45	0.82	0.09	0.09	0.64	1.09
Jay-R Reyes	9	3	8.7	5	18	.278	0	3	.000	2	4	.500	2.11	0.56	0.11	0.11	0.67	1.33
Alex Cabagnot	16	9	31.4	77	187	.412	33	94	.351	34	46	.739	3.88	3.94	0.56	0.19	1.94	13.81
Chris Ross	17	11	30.6	47	108	.435	7	34	.206	45	60	.750	4.12	6.35	2.29	0.18	2.24	8.59
Marcio Lassiter	17	16	36.1	84	205	.410	56	132	.424	27	36	.750	4.12	2.82	1.12	0.29	1.88	14.76
June Mar Fajardo	15	11	30.4	82	149	.550	0	0	.000	49	79	.620	9.20	0.87	0.33	0.73	2.13	14.20
Ryan Araña	13	1	10.0	12	26	.462	3	6	.500	4	6	.667	0.92	0.38	0.38	0.08	0.62	2.38
Gary David*	6	0	9.2	9	17	.529	5	8	.625	0	0	.000	0.83	0.17	0.00	0.00	0.83	3.83
Nelbert Omolon	1	0	6.0	0	0	.000	0	0	.000	0	0	.000	1.00	0.00	0.00	0.00	0.00	0.00
Gabby Espinas	16	1	14.8	30	53	.566	1	3	.333	20	24	.833	3.12	0.44	0.12	0.12	0.38	5.06
Michael Mabulac	3	0	1.0	2	4	.500	0	0	.000	0	0	.000	0.00	0.00	0.00	0.00	0.33	1.33
Arwind Santos	15	3	27.3	56	148	.378	31	106	.292	15	23	.652	4.60	1.20	0.13	1.13	1.00	10.53
Arizona Reid	1	1	38.0	12	31	.387	0	6	.000	1	2	.500	17.00	5.00	1.00	0.00	5.00	25.00
Tyler Wilkerson	15	15	43.1	187	388	.482	48	136	.353	127	168	.756	14.27	2.67	1.40	2.07	4.33	36.60
David Semerad	10	8	9.6	6	18	.333	0	0	.000	2	4	.500	1.70	0.20	0.10	0.00	0.20	1.40
Ronald Tubid	11	3	9.0	6	26	.231	4	16	.250	6	8	.750	1.27	0.45	0.36	0.00	0.45	2.00
Yancy de Ocampo	11	0	9.6	5	24	.208	1	10	.100	5	8	.625	2.09	0.36	0.09	0.27	0.27	1.45

*Stats after being acquired by the Beermen in an in-season transaction.

=== Governors' Cup ===
Player	GP	GS	MPG	FGM	FGA	FG%	3PM	3PA	3FG%	FTM	FTA	FT%	RPG	APG	SPG	BPG	TOT	PPG
Mahmoud Abdeen	3	0	13.7	4	17	.235	3	10	.300	0	2	.000	1.67	2.33	0.67	0.00	1.00	3.67
Brian Heruela	10	0	6.7	9	21	.429	5	10	.500	1	2	.500	1.00	0.70	0.10	0.10	0.40	2.40
Chris Lutz	0	0	0.0	0	0	.000	0	0	.000	0	0	.000	0.00	0.00	0.00	0.00	0.00	0.00
Jay-R Reyes	11	3	6.5	10	17	.588	3	5	.600	2	6	.333	1.36	0.09	0.00	0.09	0.09	2.27
Alex Cabagnot	16	15	34.9	86	200	.430	34	81	.420	43	56	.768	3.69	3.81	1.06	0.12	2.06	15.56
Chris Ross	16	7	24.1	32	84	.381	3	22	.136	12	19	.632	3.44	4.44	2.00	0.25	2.31	4.94
Elijah Millsap	7	7	38.1	59	159	.371	23	65	.354	32	50	.640	11.71	4.57	1.43	0.86	3.86	24.71
Mike Singletary	3	3	39.3	21	54	.389	2	14	.143	18	31	.581	13.00	3.67	1.00	1.00	3.67	20.67
Marcio Lassiter	17	14	34.5	66	154	.429	43	100	.430	8	11	.727	4.06	2.88	0.88	0.65	2.00	10.76
June Mar Fajardo	17	14	35.7	117	201	.582	0	1	.000	87	130	.669	12.88	1.47	0.41	1.35	3.24	18.88
Ryan Araña	12	0	9.0	10	27	.370	5	10	.500	3	7	.427	1.17	0.17	0.17	0.08	0.67	2.33
Gary David	11	1	11.6	20	49	.408	7	24	.292	6	10	.600	1.27	0.18	0.00	0.09	0.45	4.82
Gabby Espinas	8	0	7.5	6	11	.545	1	1	1.000	4	6	.667	1.25	0.38	0.38	0.00	0.62	2.12
Michael Mabulac	2	0	1.5	1	1	1.000	0	0	.000	0	0	.000	0.00	0.00	0.00	0.00	0.00	1.00
Arwind Santos	13	11	32.1	63	147	.429	27	84	.321	24	26	.923	6.92	2.08	0.69	1.46	1.23	13.62
Arizona Reid	6	6	43.5	80	171	.468	17	57	.298	31	34	.912	11.17	4.50	1.67	0.33	3.50	34.67
David Semerad	8	0	5.3	1	3	.333	0	0	.000	0	2	.000	1.62	0.12	0.12	0.00	0.25	0.25
Ronald Tubid	17	3	16.4	27	86	.314	21	59	.356	9	11	.818	2.82	0.53	0.29	0.12	0.65	4.94
Yancy de Ocampo	13	0	10.2	13	32	.406	3	13	.231	0	1	.000	2.77	0.62	0.15	0.31	0.77	2.23
