= 2015–16 Blackwater Elite season =

- Head coach: Leo Isaac
- Owners: Ever Bilena Cosmetics, Inc.

Philippine Cup results
- Record: 3–8 (27.3%)
- Place: 10th
- Playoff finish: Quarterfinalist (lost to Rain or Shine in one game with twice-to-win disadvantage in Phase 1)

Commissioner's Cup results
- Record: 3–8 (27.3%)
- Place: 10th
- Playoff finish: Did not qualify

Governors' Cup results
- Record: 1–10 (9.1%)
- Place: 12th
- Playoff finish: Did not qualify

Blackwater Elite seasons

The 2015–16 Blackwater Elite season was the 2nd season of the franchise in the Philippine Basketball Association (PBA).

== Key dates ==
=== 2015 ===
- August 23: The 2015 PBA draft took place in Midtown Atrium, Robinson Place Manila.

== Draft picks ==
Round	Pick	Player	Position	Nationality	PBA D-League team	College
1	9	Arthur dela Cruz	SF	Philippines	Hapee Fresh Fighters	San Beda
2	13	Almond Vosotros	SG	Philippines	Cebuana Lhuillier Gems	DLSU
3	23	Jason Melano	SF	Philippines	Cagayan Valley Rising Suns	St. Francis of Assisi
4	34	Keith Agovida	SF	Philippines	Keramix Mixers	Arellano
5	43	Jawhar Purdy	SG	United States	Wang's Basketball Couriers	Cal State Stanislaus
6	48	Christian Palma	SF	Philippines	Cagayan Valley Rising Suns	Arellano
7	51	Mon Abundo	PG	Philippines	Café France Bakers	CEU
8	54	Randy Dilay	SG	United States	Tanduay Light Rhum Masters	Dominican (IL)

== Roster ==
2015–16 Blackwater Elite roster
Players
Coaches

Pos.	#	POB	Name	Height	Weight	DOB (YYYY–MM–DD)	From
G	1	(Philippines)	Jerick Cañada (IN)	5 ft 8 in (1.73 m)	156 lb (71 kg)	1988–05–27	Adamson
G	2	(Philippines)	Denok Miranda	5 ft 11 in (1.80 m)	195 lb (88 kg)	1982–07–14	Far Eastern
G	4	(Philippines)	Raphy Reyes	5 ft 10 in (1.78 m)	165 lb (75 kg)	1987–12–01	UE
G	5	(Philippines)	Juami Tiongson	5 ft 10 in (1.78 m)	175 lb (79 kg)	1991–02–05	Ateneo
G	6	(Philippines)	Carlo Lastimosa	6 ft 0 in (1.83 m)	182 lb (83 kg)	1990–09–03	St. Benilde
C	7	(Philippines)	Poy Erram (injured)	6 ft 8 in (2.03 m)	227 lb (103 kg)	1989–07–07	Ateneo
G	8	(Philippines)	John Pinto	5 ft 10 in (1.78 m)	195 lb (88 kg)	1990–10–15	Arellano
G	12	(Philippines)	Roi Sumang	5 ft 8 in (1.73 m)	155 lb (70 kg)	1990–12–12	UE
F	15	(Philippines)	James Sena	6 ft 5 in (1.96 m)	225 lb (102 kg)	1988–08–31	José Rizal
F	16	(Philippines)	Jason Melano	6 ft 3 in (1.91 m)	190 lb (86 kg)	1990–10–18	Saint Francis of Assisi
F/C	17	(Philippines)	Frank Golla	6 ft 4 in (1.93 m)	290 lb (132 kg)	1990–01–17	Ateneo
F	21	(Philippines)	Riego Gamalinda	6 ft 3 in (1.91 m)	184 lb (83 kg)	1986–05–25	San Beda
F	25	(Philippines)	Arthur dela Cruz	6 ft 4 in (1.93 m)	210 lb (95 kg)	1992–05–09	San Beda
F	26	(Philippines)	Reil Cervantes (C)	6 ft 4 in (1.93 m)	198 lb (90 kg)	1986–08–16	Far Eastern
F	27	(Philippines)	Jaymo Eguilos	6 ft 5 in (1.96 m)	204 lb (93 kg)	1986–08–27	Far Eastern
F/C	32	(United States)	Kyle Pascual	6 ft 6 in (1.98 m)	210 lb (95 kg)	1990–04–13	San Beda
G	36	(Australia)	Scott O'Mara (IN)	6 ft 0 in (1.83 m)	200 lb (91 kg)	1991–01–13	Dandenong Rangers
F	–	(Philippines)	Ronald Pascual (IN)	6 ft 3 in (1.91 m)	196 lb (89 kg)	1988–06–23	San Sebastian

Head coach

- (Philippines) Leo Isaac

Assistant coach(es)

- (Philippines) Aris Dimaunahan (1st Assistant)
- (Philippines) Rodil Sablan
- (Philippines) Bong Ramos
- (Philippines) Patrick Aquino
- (Philippines) Junjie Ablan
- (Philippines) Tylon Darjuan

Team manager

- (Philippines) Johnson Martines

Legend

- (C) Team captain
- (CI) Commissioner's Cup Import
- (GI) Governors' Cup Import
- (EI) EASL Import
- (DP) Unsigned draft pick
- (FA) Free agent
- (IN) Inactive
- (S) Suspended
- (R) Rookie
- Injured

Roster

== Philippine Cup ==
=== Eliminations ===
==== Standings ====
Pos	Team	W	L	PCT	GB	Qualification
1	Alaska Aces	9	2	.818 (Note: Head-to-head record: Alaska 1–0 San Miguel)	—	Advance to semifinals
2	San Miguel Beermen	9	2	.818	—	Advance to semifinals
3	Rain or Shine Elasto Painters	8	3	.727	1	Twice-to-beat in the quarterfinals
4	Barangay Ginebra San Miguel	7	4	.636 (Note: Head-to-head record: Barangay Ginebra 1–0 GlobalPort)	2	Twice-to-beat in the quarterfinals
5	GlobalPort Batang Pier	7	4	.636	2	Twice-to-beat in the quarterfinals
6	TNT Tropang Texters	6	5	.545	3	Twice-to-beat in the quarterfinals
7	NLEX Road Warriors	5	6	.455 (Note: Head-to-head record: NLEX 1–0 Barako Bull)	4	Twice-to-win in the quarterfinals
8	Barako Bull Energy	5	6	.455	4	Twice-to-win in the quarterfinals
9	Star Hotshots	4	7	.364	5	Twice-to-win in the quarterfinals
10	Blackwater Elite	3	8	.273	6	Twice-to-win in the quarterfinals
11	Mahindra Enforcer	2	9	.182	7	
12	Meralco Bolts	1	10	.091	8	

Source: PBA.ph

=== Playoffs ===
==== Bracket ====
Quarterfinals (1st phase) (Higher seeds twice-to-beat)
3	Rain or Shine	95
10	Blackwater	90
6	TNT	90
7	NLEX	88
4	Barangay Ginebra	92*
9	Star	89
5	GlobalPort	94
8	Barako Bull	85

Quarterfinals (2nd phase) (Single elimination)
3	Rain or Shine	104
6	TNT	89
4	Barangay Ginebra	83
5	GlobalPort	84*

Semifinals (Best-of-7)
2	San Miguel	4
3	Rain or Shine	2
1	Alaska	4
5	GlobalPort	1

Finals (Best-of-7)
2	San Miguel	4
1	Alaska	3

*Game went into overtime

== Commissioner's Cup ==
=== Eliminations ===
==== Standings ====
Pos	Team	W	L	PCT	GB	Qualification
1	San Miguel Beermen	8	3	.727 (Note: Head-to-head record: San Miguel 1–0 Meralco)	—	Twice-to-beat in the quarterfinals
2	Meralco Bolts	8	3	.727	—	Twice-to-beat in the quarterfinals
3	Alaska Aces	7	4	.636 (Note: Head-to-head quotient: Alaska 1.18, Barangay Ginebra 1.03, Rain or Shine 0.84)	1	Best-of-three quarterfinals
4	Barangay Ginebra San Miguel	7	4	.636	1	Best-of-three quarterfinals
5	Rain or Shine Elasto Painters	7	4	.636	1	Best-of-three quarterfinals
6	Tropang TNT	6	5	.545	2	Best-of-three quarterfinals
7	NLEX Road Warriors	5	6	.455 (Note: Head-to-head record: NLEX 1–0 Star)	3	Twice-to-win in the quarterfinals
8	Star Hotshots	5	6	.455	3	Twice-to-win in the quarterfinals
9	Mahindra Enforcer	4	7	.364	4	
10	Blackwater Elite	3	8	.273 (Note: Head-to-head quotient: Blackwater 1.04, Phoenix 0.99, GlobalPort 0.98)	5	
11	Phoenix Fuel Masters	3	8	.273	5	
12	GlobalPort Batang Pier	3	8	.273	5	

Source: PBA.ph

== Governors' Cup ==
=== Eliminations ===
==== Standings ====
Pos	Team	W	L	PCT	GB	Qualification
1	TNT KaTropa	10	1	.909	—	Twice-to-beat in the quarterfinals
2	San Miguel Beermen	8	3	.727 (Note: Head-to-head record: San Miguel 1–0 Barangay Ginebra)	2	Twice-to-beat in the quarterfinals
3	Barangay Ginebra San Miguel	8	3	.727	2	Twice-to-beat in the quarterfinals
4	Meralco Bolts	6	5	.545 (Note: Head-to-head quotient: Meralco 1.039, Mahindra 1.017, Alaska 0.950; fourth seed playoff: Meralco 104–99 Mahindra)	4	Twice-to-beat in the quarterfinals
5	Mahindra Enforcer	6	5	.545	4	Twice-to-win in the quarterfinals
6	Alaska Aces	6	5	.545	4	Twice-to-win in the quarterfinals
7	NLEX Road Warriors	5	6	.455 (Note: Head-to-head quotient: NLEX 1.04, Rain or Shine 1.03, Phoenix 0.93; eighth seed playoff: Phoenix 105–94 Rain or Shine)	5	Twice-to-win in the quarterfinals
8	Phoenix Fuel Masters	5	6	.455	5	Twice-to-win in the quarterfinals
9	Rain or Shine Elasto Painters	5	6	.455	5	
10	GlobalPort Batang Pier	4	7	.364	6	
11	Star Hotshots	2	9	.182	8	
12	Blackwater Elite	1	10	.091	9	

Source: PBA.ph

== Transactions ==
=== Free agent signings ===
Player	Contract length	Date signed	Former team
Denok Miranda	One-conference	August 15, 2016	TNT Katropa

=== Trades ===
Off-season

August 7, 2015	To Blackwater Mike Cortez; James Sena (from Meralco)	To Meralco Jimmy Alapag (from Talk 'N Text via Blackwater)	To Talk 'N Text Larry Rodriguez (from Blackwater)

Commissioner's Cup

March 20, 2016	To Blackwater Kyle Pascual	To Mahindra Jason Ballesteros

May 11, 2016
To Blackwater

Roi Sumang (from GlobalPort)
To GlobalPort

Karl Dehesa (from Mahindra)

Ronald Pascual (from Star)

Yousef Taha (from Star)

To Phoenix

Simon Enciso (from NLEX)

Mark Borboran (from NLEX)

Mark Cruz (from Star)

Norbert Torres (from Star)

Jonathan Uyloan (from GlobalPort)

To Star

RR Garcia (from Phoenix)

Rodney Brondial (from Phoenix)

Keith Jensen (from GlobalPort)

To Mahindra

Keith Agovida (from Blackwater)

Paolo Taha (from GlobalPort)

To NLEX

Mac Baracael (from Phoenix)

Emman Monfort (from Phoenix)

2018 second rounder (from Phoenix)

Governors' Cup

September 1, 2016	To Blackwater Ronald Pascual	To GlobalPort Mike Cortez

=== Recruited imports ===
Tournament	Name	Debuted	Last game	Record
Commissioner's Cup	M. J. Rhett	February 10 (vs. TNT)	April 10 (vs. Rain or Shine)	3–8
Governors' Cup	(United States) Eric Dawson	July 16 (vs. NLEX)	August 21 (vs. Mahindra)	1–5
Governors' Cup	No regular import	August 17 (vs. Meralco), August 28 (vs. Alaska)		0–2
Governors' Cup	(United States) Keala King	September 7 (vs. Phoenix)	September 18 (vs. San Miguel)	0–3
Governors' Cup	(Palestine) Imad Qahwash*	July 29 (vs. Rain or Shine)	August 28 (vs. Alaska)	0–6
