= 2015–16 Star Hotshots season =

- Head coach: Jason Webb
- Owners: San Miguel-Pure Foods Co., Inc. (a San Miguel Corporation subsidiary)

Philippine Cup results
- Record: 4–7 (36.4%)
- Place: 9th
- Playoff finish: Quarterfinalist (lost to Ginebra in one game with twice-to-win disadvantage in Phase 1)

Commissioner's Cup results
- Record: 5–6 (45.5%)
- Place: 8th
- Playoff finish: Quarterfinalist (lost to San Miguel in two games with twice-to-win disadvantage)

Governors' Cup results
- Record: 2–9 (18.2%)
- Place: 11th
- Playoff finish: Did not qualify

Star Hotshots seasons

The 2015–16 Star Hotshots season was the 28th season of the franchise in the Philippine Basketball Association (PBA).

== Key dates ==
- July 20: Assistant coach Jason Webb was promoted as the head coach of the Star Hotshots.
- August 23: The 2015 PBA draft took place in Midtown Atrium, Robinson Place Manila.

== Draft picks ==
Round	Pick	Player	Position	Nationality	PBA D-League team	College
1	8	Norbert Torres	C	Canada	Cebuana Lhuillier Gems	DLSU
3	30	Mark Cruz	PG	Philippines	Jumbo Plastic Linoleum Giants	Letran
4	39	Rodel de Leon	SF	Philippines	Cafe France Bakers	CEU

== Roster ==
2015–16 Star Hotshots roster
Players
Coaches

Pos.	#	POB	Name	Height	Weight	DOB (YYYY–MM–DD)	From
G	2	(Philippines)	Justin Melton	5 ft 11 in (1.80 m)	163 lb (74 kg)	1987–04–07	Mount Olive
C	4	(United States)	Rafi Reavis (C)	6 ft 8 in (2.03 m)	210 lb (95 kg)	1977–07–26	Coppin State
G	8	(Philippines)	Peter June Simon	6 ft 0 in (1.83 m)	180 lb (82 kg)	1980–06–01	Mindanao
F	9	(Philippines)	Jake Pascual	6 ft 4 in (1.93 m)	200 lb (91 kg)	1988–11–11	San Beda
F/C	10	(Philippines)	Ian Sangalang	6 ft 7 in (2.01 m)	212 lb (96 kg)	1991–12–20	San Sebastian
G/F	11	(United States)	Alex Mallari	6 ft 4 in (1.93 m)	176 lb (80 kg)	1987–03–26	Lewis–Clark State
G	12	(Philippines)	R.R. Garcia	5 ft 11 in (1.80 m)	165 lb (75 kg)	1990–01–12	Far Eastern
G	14	(Philippines)	Mark Barroca	5 ft 10 in (1.78 m)	170 lb (77 kg)	1986–04–25	Far Eastern
F	15	(Philippines)	Marc Pingris	6 ft 4 in (1.93 m)	210 lb (95 kg)	1981–10–16	Far Eastern
G/F	18	(Philippines)	James Yap	6 ft 2 in (1.88 m)	205 lb (93 kg)	1982–02–15	UE
F	19	(Philippines)	Jerwin Gaco	6 ft 4 in (1.93 m)	180 lb (82 kg)	1981–01–17	De La Salle
G/F	22	(Philippines)	Allein Maliksi	6 ft 4 in (1.93 m)	180 lb (82 kg)	1987–09–18	UST
F	32	(United States)	Keith Jensen (IN)	6 ft 5 in (1.96 m)	209 lb (95 kg)	1988–01–07	NYU
F	91	(Philippines)	Rodney Brondial	6 ft 4 in (1.93 m)	210 lb (95 kg)	1990–11–20	Adamson

Head coach

- (Philippines) Jason Webb

Assistant coach(es)

- (Philippines) Johnny Abarrientos (1st Assistant)
- (Philippines) Mon Jose
- (Philippines) Tony Boy Espinosa
- (Philippines) Juno Sauler

Team manager

- (Philippines) Alvin Patrimonio

Legend

- (C) Team captain
- (CI) Commissioner's Cup Import
- (GI) Governors' Cup Import
- (EI) EASL Import
- (DP) Unsigned draft pick
- (FA) Free agent
- (IN) Inactive
- (S) Suspended
- (R) Rookie
- Injured

Roster

== Philippine Cup ==
=== Eliminations ===
==== Standings ====
Pos	Team	W	L	PCT	GB	Qualification
1	Alaska Aces	9	2	.818 (Note: Head-to-head record: Alaska 1–0 San Miguel)	—	Advance to semifinals
2	San Miguel Beermen	9	2	.818	—	Advance to semifinals
3	Rain or Shine Elasto Painters	8	3	.727	1	Twice-to-beat in the quarterfinals
4	Barangay Ginebra San Miguel	7	4	.636 (Note: Head-to-head record: Barangay Ginebra 1–0 GlobalPort)	2	Twice-to-beat in the quarterfinals
5	GlobalPort Batang Pier	7	4	.636	2	Twice-to-beat in the quarterfinals
6	TNT Tropang Texters	6	5	.545	3	Twice-to-beat in the quarterfinals
7	NLEX Road Warriors	5	6	.455 (Note: Head-to-head record: NLEX 1–0 Barako Bull)	4	Twice-to-win in the quarterfinals
8	Barako Bull Energy	5	6	.455	4	Twice-to-win in the quarterfinals
9	Star Hotshots	4	7	.364	5	Twice-to-win in the quarterfinals
10	Blackwater Elite	3	8	.273	6	Twice-to-win in the quarterfinals
11	Mahindra Enforcer	2	9	.182	7	
12	Meralco Bolts	1	10	.091	8	

Source: PBA.ph

=== Playoffs ===
==== Bracket ====
Quarterfinals (1st phase) (Higher seeds twice-to-beat)
3	Rain or Shine	95
10	Blackwater	90
6	TNT	90
7	NLEX	88
4	Barangay Ginebra	92*
9	Star	89
5	GlobalPort	94
8	Barako Bull	85

Quarterfinals (2nd phase) (Single elimination)
3	Rain or Shine	104
6	TNT	89
4	Barangay Ginebra	83
5	GlobalPort	84*

Semifinals (Best-of-7)
2	San Miguel	4
3	Rain or Shine	2
1	Alaska	4
5	GlobalPort	1

Finals (Best-of-7)
2	San Miguel	4
1	Alaska	3

*Game went into overtime

== Commissioner's Cup ==
=== Eliminations ===
==== Standings ====
Pos	Team	W	L	PCT	GB	Qualification
1	San Miguel Beermen	8	3	.727 (Note: Head-to-head record: San Miguel 1–0 Meralco)	—	Twice-to-beat in the quarterfinals
2	Meralco Bolts	8	3	.727	—	Twice-to-beat in the quarterfinals
3	Alaska Aces	7	4	.636 (Note: Head-to-head quotient: Alaska 1.18, Barangay Ginebra 1.03, Rain or Shine 0.84)	1	Best-of-three quarterfinals
4	Barangay Ginebra San Miguel	7	4	.636	1	Best-of-three quarterfinals
5	Rain or Shine Elasto Painters	7	4	.636	1	Best-of-three quarterfinals
6	Tropang TNT	6	5	.545	2	Best-of-three quarterfinals
7	NLEX Road Warriors	5	6	.455 (Note: Head-to-head record: NLEX 1–0 Star)	3	Twice-to-win in the quarterfinals
8	Star Hotshots	5	6	.455	3	Twice-to-win in the quarterfinals
9	Mahindra Enforcer	4	7	.364	4	
10	Blackwater Elite	3	8	.273 (Note: Head-to-head quotient: Blackwater 1.04, Phoenix 0.99, GlobalPort 0.98)	5	
11	Phoenix Fuel Masters	3	8	.273	5	
12	GlobalPort Batang Pier	3	8	.273	5	

Source: PBA.ph

=== Playoffs ===
==== Bracket ====
Quarterfinals
(#1 twice-to-beat)
1	San Miguel	99	103
8	Star	108	99
(Best-of-3)
4	Barangay Ginebra	0
5	Rain or Shine	2
(#2 twice-to-beat)
2	Meralco	104
7	NLEX	97
(Best-of-3)
3	Alaska	2
6	TNT	1

Semifinals (Best-of-5)
1	San Miguel	1
5	Rain or Shine	3
2	Meralco	2
3	Alaska	3

Finals (Best-of-7)
5	Rain or Shine	4
3	Alaska	2

== Governors' Cup ==
=== Eliminations ===
==== Standings ====
Pos	Team	W	L	PCT	GB	Qualification
1	TNT KaTropa	10	1	.909	—	Twice-to-beat in the quarterfinals
2	San Miguel Beermen	8	3	.727 (Note: Head-to-head record: San Miguel 1–0 Barangay Ginebra)	2	Twice-to-beat in the quarterfinals
3	Barangay Ginebra San Miguel	8	3	.727	2	Twice-to-beat in the quarterfinals
4	Meralco Bolts	6	5	.545 (Note: Head-to-head quotient: Meralco 1.039, Mahindra 1.017, Alaska 0.950; fourth seed playoff: Meralco 104–99 Mahindra)	4	Twice-to-beat in the quarterfinals
5	Mahindra Enforcer	6	5	.545	4	Twice-to-win in the quarterfinals
6	Alaska Aces	6	5	.545	4	Twice-to-win in the quarterfinals
7	NLEX Road Warriors	5	6	.455 (Note: Head-to-head quotient: NLEX 1.04, Rain or Shine 1.03, Phoenix 0.93; eighth seed playoff: Phoenix 105–94 Rain or Shine)	5	Twice-to-win in the quarterfinals
8	Phoenix Fuel Masters	5	6	.455	5	Twice-to-win in the quarterfinals
9	Rain or Shine Elasto Painters	5	6	.455	5	
10	GlobalPort Batang Pier	4	7	.364	6	
11	Star Hotshots	2	9	.182	8	
12	Blackwater Elite	1	10	.091	9	

Source: PBA.ph

== Transactions ==
=== Trades ===
Off-season

September 19, 2015

To Barako Bull

Mick Pennisi
To Star

2017 2nd round pick

September 28, 2015

To Barangay Ginebra

Joe Devance (via Barako Bull)
To Barako Bull

Mac Baracael
Prince Caperal
To Star

Ronald Pascual
Jake Pascual
To GlobalPort

Dorian Peña

Governor's Cup

October 13, 2016
October 13, 2016	To Star Paul Lee	To Rain or Shine James Yap

=== Recruited imports ===
Tournament	Name	Debuted	Last game	Record
Commissioner's Cup	Denzel Bowles	February 10 (vs. Meralco)	February 28 (vs. Ginebra)	1–4
Commissioner's Cup	Ricardo Ratliffe	March 6 (vs. TNT)	April 20 (vs. San Miguel)	5–3
Governors' Cup	(United States) Marqus Blakely	July 15 (vs. Mahindra)	July 31 (vs. San Miguel)	1–3
Governors' Cup	(United States) Joel Wright	August 12 (vs. NLEX)	September 16 (vs. Rain or Shine)	1–6
