= 2015–16 Barangay Ginebra San Miguel season =

- Head coach: Tim Cone
- Owner: Ginebra San Miguel, Inc.

Philippine Cup results
- Record: 7–4 (63.6%)
- Place: 4th
- Playoff finish: Quarterfinalist (lost to GlobalPort in single-elimination Phase 2)

Commissioner's Cup results
- Record: 7–4 (63.6%)
- Place: 4th
- Playoff finish: Quarterfinalist (lost to Rain or Shine, 0–2)

Governors' Cup results
- Record: 8–3 (72.7%)
- Place: 3rd
- Playoff finish: Champions (def. Meralco, 4–2)

Barangay Ginebra San Miguel seasons

The 2015–16 Barangay Ginebra San Miguel season was the 37th season of the franchise in the Philippine Basketball Association (PBA).

== Key dates ==
=== 2015 ===
- August 23: The 2015 PBA draft took place in Midtown Atrium, Robinson Place Manila.

== Draft picks ==
| Round | Pick | Player | Position | Nationality | PBA D-League team | College |
|---|---|---|---|---|---|---|
| 1 | 5 | Scottie Thompson | SG | Philippines | Hapee Fresh Fighters | Perpetual Help |
| 2 | 16 | Aljon Mariano | SF | Philippines | Tanduay Light Rhum Masters | UST |
| 3 | 28 | Dennice Villamor | SF | Philippines | Jumbo Plastic Linoleum Giants | NU |

== Roster ==
2015–16 Barangay Ginebra San Miguel roster
Players
Coaches

| Pos. | # | POB | Name | Height | Weight | DOB (YYYY–MM–DD) | From |
|---|---|---|---|---|---|---|---|
| G | 0 | (United States) | Franklin Bonifacio | 6 ft 2 in (1.88 m) | 180 lb (82 kg) | 1990–03–01 | Las Positas |
| G | 3 | (United States) | Sol Mercado | 6 ft 1 in (1.85 m) | 200 lb (91 kg) | 1984–05–06 | Biola |
| G | 5 | (Philippines) | LA Tenorio | 5 ft 8 in (1.73 m) | 151 lb (68 kg) | 1984–07–09 | Ateneo |
| G | 6 | (Philippines) | Scottie Thompson | 6 ft 1 in (1.85 m) | 180 lb (82 kg) | 1993–07–12 | UPHSD |
| F/C | 10 | (Philippines) | Dave Marcelo | 6 ft 4 in (1.93 m) | 223 lb (101 kg) | 1989–02–22 | San Beda |
| G | 13 | (Philippines) | Jayjay Helterbrand | 5 ft 11 in (1.80 m) | 170 lb (77 kg) | 1976–10–14 | Kentucky |
| F | 14 | (Philippines) | Nico Salva | 6 ft 3 in (1.91 m) | 194 lb (88 kg) | 1990–03–08 | Ateneo |
| F | 19 | (Philippines) | Dennice Villamor | 6 ft 4 in (1.93 m) | 195 lb (88 kg) | 1990–07–01 | National-U |
| C | 20 | (United States) | Greg Slaughter (injured) | 7 ft 0 in (2.13 m) | 258 lb (117 kg) | 1988–05–19 | Ateneo |
| F/C | 25 | (Philippines) | Japeth Aguilar | 6 ft 9 in (2.06 m) | 235 lb (107 kg) | 1987–01–25 | Western Kentucky |
| F | 27 | (Philippines) | Jervy Cruz | 6 ft 3 in (1.91 m) | 220 lb (100 kg) | 1986–09–09 | UST |
| F | 31 | (Philippines) | Aljon Mariano | 6 ft 3 in (1.91 m) | 175 lb (79 kg) | 1992–08–03 | UST |
| F | 34 | (United States) | Chris Ellis | 6 ft 5 in (1.96 m) | 185 lb (84 kg) | 1988–12–05 | Mary Hardin–Baylor |
| F | 38 | (United States) | Joe Devance | 6 ft 7 in (2.01 m) | 225 lb (102 kg) | 1982–02–19 | UTEP |
| G | 47 | (Philippines) | Mark Caguioa (C) | 6 ft 1 in (1.85 m) | 185 lb (84 kg) | 1979–11–19 | Glendale CC (CA) |
| F | 12 | (United States) | Othyus Jeffers (CI) | 6 ft 5 in (1.96 m) | 200 lb (91 kg) | 1985–08–05 | Robert Morris (IL) |
| F | 11 | (United States) | Paul Harris (GI) | 6 ft 5 in (1.96 m) | 230 lb (104 kg) | 1986–10–15 | Syracuse |
| F | 32 | (United States) | Justin Brownlee (GI) | 6 ft 6 in (1.98 m) | 220 lb (100 kg) | 1988–04–23 | St. John's |

Head coach

- (United States) Tim Cone

Assistant coach(es)

- (Philippines) Richard del Rosario (1st Assistant)
- (Philippines) Olsen Racela
- (Philippines) Freddie Abuda

Team manager

- (Philippines) Alfrancis Chua^{[a]}
- (Philippines) Raymond Rodriguez (Assistant)

Legend

- (C) Team captain
- (CI) Commissioner's Cup Import
- (GI) Governors' Cup Import
- (EI) EASL Import
- (DP) Unsigned draft pick
- (FA) Free agent
- (IN) Inactive
- (S) Suspended
- (R) Rookie
- Injured

Roster

- ^{a} Chua also serves as Barangay Ginebra's board governor.

== Depth chart ==
| Pos. | Starting 5 | Bench 1 | Bench 2 | Bench 3 |
|---|---|---|---|---|
| C | Greg Slaughter | Dave Marcelo |
| PF | Japeth Aguilar | Joe Devance | Jervy Cruz | Dennice Villamor |
| SF | Chris Ellis | Aljon Mariano | Nico Salva |
| SG | Scottie Thompson | Mark Caguioa | Franklin Bonifacio |
| PG | LA Tenorio | Sol Mercado | Jayjay Helterbrand |

== Philippine Cup ==
=== Eliminations ===
==== Game log ====
2015–16 PBA Philippine Cup game log
October

| Game | Date | Opponent | Score | High points | High rebounds | High assists | Location Attendance | Record |
|---|---|---|---|---|---|---|---|---|
| 1 | October 25 | Star Hotshots | 86–78 | Slaughter (28) | Slaughter (16) | Thompson (6) | Smart Araneta Coliseum | 0–1 |
| 2 | October 31 | Barako Bull Energy | 82–79 | Slaughter (27) | Slaughter (26) | Slaughter(4) | Mall of Asia Arena | 0–2 |

November

| Game | Date | Opponent | Score | High points | High rebounds | High assists | Location Attendance | Record |
|---|---|---|---|---|---|---|---|---|
| 3 | November 7 | Alaska Aces | 93–92 | Slaughter (27) | Slaughter (19) | RJ Jazul (10) | Al Wasl, Dubai | 1–2 |
| 4 | November 15 | San Miguel Beermen | 100–82 | Arwind Santos (24) | Junemar Fajardo (14) | Chris Ross (8) | Philsports Arena | 1–3 |

2015–16 schedule

==== Bracket ====
Quarterfinals (1st phase) (Higher seeds twice-to-beat)
3 | Rain or Shine | 95
10 | Blackwater | 90
6 | TNT | 90
7 | NLEX | 88
4 | Barangay Ginebra | 92*
9 | Star | 89
5 | GlobalPort | 94
8 | Barako Bull | 85

Quarterfinals (2nd phase) (Single elimination)
3 | Rain or Shine | 104
6 | TNT | 89
4 | Barangay Ginebra | 83
5 | GlobalPort | 84*

Semifinals (Best-of-7)
2 | San Miguel | 4
3 | Rain or Shine | 2
1 | Alaska | 4
5 | GlobalPort | 1

Finals (Best-of-7)
2 | San Miguel | 4
1 | Alaska | 3

*Game went into overtime

== Commissioner's Cup ==
=== Eliminations ===
==== Standings ====
| Pos | Team | W | L | PCT | GB | Qualification |
|---|---|---|---|---|---|---|
| 1 | San Miguel Beermen | 8 | 3 | .727 (Note: Head-to-head record: San Miguel 1–0 Meralco) | — | Twice-to-beat in the quarterfinals |
| 2 | Meralco Bolts | 8 | 3 | .727 | — | Twice-to-beat in the quarterfinals |
| 3 | Alaska Aces | 7 | 4 | .636 (Note: Head-to-head quotient: Alaska 1.18, Barangay Ginebra 1.03, Rain or Shine 0.84) | 1 | Best-of-three quarterfinals |
| 4 | Barangay Ginebra San Miguel | 7 | 4 | .636 | 1 | Best-of-three quarterfinals |
| 5 | Rain or Shine Elasto Painters | 7 | 4 | .636 | 1 | Best-of-three quarterfinals |
| 6 | Tropang TNT | 6 | 5 | .545 | 2 | Best-of-three quarterfinals |
| 7 | NLEX Road Warriors | 5 | 6 | .455 (Note: Head-to-head record: NLEX 1–0 Star) | 3 | Twice-to-win in the quarterfinals |
| 8 | Star Hotshots | 5 | 6 | .455 | 3 | Twice-to-win in the quarterfinals |
| 9 | Mahindra Enforcer | 4 | 7 | .364 | 4 | |
| 10 | Blackwater Elite | 3 | 8 | .273 (Note: Head-to-head quotient: Blackwater 1.04, Phoenix 0.99, GlobalPort 0.98) | 5 | |
| 11 | Phoenix Fuel Masters | 3 | 8 | .273 | 5 | |
| 12 | GlobalPort Batang Pier | 3 | 8 | .273 | 5 | |

Source: PBA.ph

=== Playoffs ===
==== Bracket ====
Quarterfinals
(#1 twice-to-beat)
1 | San Miguel | 99 | 103
8 | Star | 108 | 99
(Best-of-3)
4 | Barangay Ginebra | 0
5 | Rain or Shine | 2
(#2 twice-to-beat)
2 | Meralco | 104
7 | NLEX | 97
(Best-of-3)
3 | Alaska | 2
6 | TNT | 1

Semifinals (Best-of-5)
1 | San Miguel | 1
5 | Rain or Shine | 3
2 | Meralco | 2
3 | Alaska | 3

Finals (Best-of-7)
5 | Rain or Shine | 4
3 | Alaska | 2

== Governors' Cup ==
=== Eliminations ===
==== Standings ====
| Pos | Team | W | L | PCT | GB | Qualification |
|---|---|---|---|---|---|---|
| 1 | TNT KaTropa | 10 | 1 | .909 | — | Twice-to-beat in the quarterfinals |
| 2 | San Miguel Beermen | 8 | 3 | .727 (Note: Head-to-head record: San Miguel 1–0 Barangay Ginebra) | 2 | Twice-to-beat in the quarterfinals |
| 3 | Barangay Ginebra San Miguel | 8 | 3 | .727 | 2 | Twice-to-beat in the quarterfinals |
| 4 | Meralco Bolts | 6 | 5 | .545 (Note: Head-to-head quotient: Meralco 1.039, Mahindra 1.017, Alaska 0.950; fourth seed playoff: Meralco 104–99 Mahindra) | 4 | Twice-to-beat in the quarterfinals |
| 5 | Mahindra Enforcer | 6 | 5 | .545 | 4 | Twice-to-win in the quarterfinals |
| 6 | Alaska Aces | 6 | 5 | .545 | 4 | Twice-to-win in the quarterfinals |
| 7 | NLEX Road Warriors | 5 | 6 | .455 (Note: Head-to-head quotient: NLEX 1.04, Rain or Shine 1.03, Phoenix 0.93; eighth seed playoff: Phoenix 105–94 Rain or Shine) | 5 | Twice-to-win in the quarterfinals |
| 8 | Phoenix Fuel Masters | 5 | 6 | .455 | 5 | Twice-to-win in the quarterfinals |
| 9 | Rain or Shine Elasto Painters | 5 | 6 | .455 | 5 | |
| 10 | GlobalPort Batang Pier | 4 | 7 | .364 | 6 | |
| 11 | Star Hotshots | 2 | 9 | .182 | 8 | |
| 12 | Blackwater Elite | 1 | 10 | .091 | 9 | |

Source: PBA.ph

==== Game log ====
2016 PBA Governors' Cup game log
July

| Game | Date | Opponent | Score | High points | High rebounds | High assists | Location Attendance | Record |
|---|---|---|---|---|---|---|---|---|
| 1 | July 16 | GlobalPort | 93–81 | Aguilar (22) | Harris (10) | Devance (6) | Mall of Asia Arena | 1–0 |
| 2 | July 24 | Alaska | 100–109(OT) | | | | Smart Araneta Coliseum | 1–1 |
| 3 | July 27 | NLEX | 85–72 | | | | Smart Araneta Coliseum | 2–1 |
| 4 | July 30 | Meralco | 107–93 | | | | Lucena City | 3–1 |

August

| Game | Date | Opponent | Score | High points | High rebounds | High assists | Location Attendance | Record |
|---|---|---|---|---|---|---|---|---|
| 5 | August 10 | Blackwater | 107–95 | | | | Smart Araneta Coliseum | 4–1 |
| 6 | August 14 | San Miguel | 105–111(2OT) | | | | Mall of Asia Arena | 4–2 |
| 7 | August 21 | Rain Or Shine | 101–87 | | | | Smart Araneta Coliseum | 5–2 |
| 8 | August 28 | Star | 116–103 | | | | Smart Araneta Coliseum | 6–2 |

September

| Game | Date | Opponent | Score | High points | High rebounds | High assists | Location Attendance | Record |
|---|---|---|---|---|---|---|---|---|
| 9 | September 9 | Mahindra | 93–86 | | | | Smart Araneta Coliseum | 7–2 |
| 10 | September 14 | Phoenix | 97–86 | | | | Ynares Center | 8–2 |
| 11 | September 18 | TNT | 92–104 | | | | Laguna | 8–3 |

2015–16 schedule

== Playoffs ==
=== Bracket ===
Quarterfinals (Top 4 twice-to-beat)
1 | TNT | 136
8 | Phoenix | 124
4 | Meralco | 105
5 | Mahindra | 82
2 | San Miguel | 114
7 | NLEX | 110
3 | Barangay Ginebra | 109
6 | Alaska | 104

Semifinals (Best-of-5)
1 | TNT | 1
4 | Meralco | 3
2 | San Miguel | 2
3 | Barangay Ginebra | 3

Finals (Best-of-7)
4 | Meralco | 2
3 | Barangay Ginebra | 4

== Transactions ==
=== Trades ===
Preseason

| August 25, 2015 | To Barako Bull Jens Knuttel; Emman Monfort; Josh Urbiztondo | To Barangay Ginebra Nico Salva; 2016 1st round pick |

| September 28, 2015 | To Barako Bull Energy Mac Baracael; Prince Caperal | To Barangay Ginebra San Miguel Joe Devance (via Barako Bull) |
| September 28, 2015 | To GlobalPort Dorian Peña | To Star Hotshots Jake Pascual; Ronald Pascual |

Philippine Cup

| November 16, 2015 | To Barako Bull Rodney Brondial; 2018 2nd round pick | To Barangay Ginebra Jervey Cruz |

=== Recruited imports ===
| Tournament | Name | Debuted | Last game | Record |
|---|---|---|---|---|
| Commissioner's Cup | (United States) Othyus Jeffers | February 12 (vs. NLEX) | April 19 (vs. Rain or Shine) | 7–6 |
| Governors' Cup | (United States) Paul Harris | July 16 (vs. GlobalPort) | July 16 (vs. GlobalPort) | 1–0 |
| Governors' Cup | (United States) Justin Brownlee | July 24 (vs. Alaska) | October 19 (vs. Meralco) | 15–7 |
