= Arizona Reid =

American basketball player

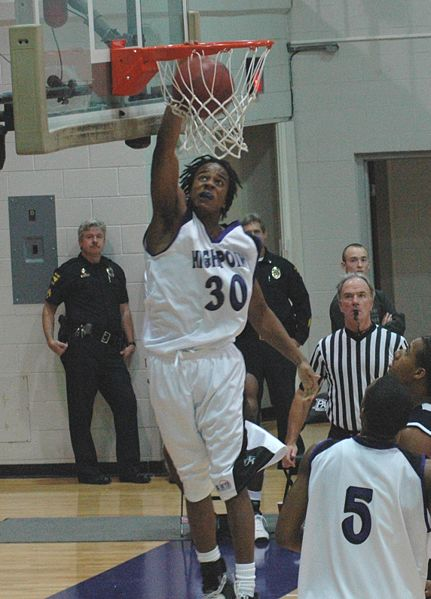
- Reid playing for High Point in 2007

Personal information
- Born: March 11, 1986 (age 40) Gaffney, South Carolina, U.S.
- Listed height: 6 ft 5 in (1.96 m)
- Listed weight: 205 lb (93 kg)

Career information
- High school: Gaffney (Gaffney, South Carolina)
- College: High Point (2004–2008)
- NBA draft: 2008: undrafted
- Playing career: 2008–2023
- Position: Small forward / power forward

Career history
- 2008–2009: Geneva Devils
- 2009–2010: Korihait
- 2010: Cairns Taipans
- 2010: Al-Riyadi Beirut
- 2010–2011: Monthey
- 2011: Rain or Shine Elasto Painters
- 2011–2012: Mitteldeutscher BC
- 2012–2013: Fribourg Olympic
- 2013: Rain or Shine Elasto Painters
- 2013: Cherkaski Mavpy
- 2013–2014: Al-Nahda Al-Kohbar
- 2014: Rain or Shine Elasto Painters
- 2014–2015: Verviers-Pepinster
- 2015: San Miguel Beermen
- 2015–2016: Pilipinas MX3 Kings
- 2016: San Miguel Beermen
- 2016: Urartu
- 2016–2017: ESSM Le Portel
- 2017–2018: Leuven Bears
- 2018: San Miguel Beermen
- 2018–2019: Monthey
- 2019–2020: Elitzur Eito Ashkelon
- 2023: Bangkok Tigers

Career highlights
- PBA champion (2015 Governors'); 2× PBA Best Import of the Conference (2011 Governors', 2014 Governors'); German ProA MVP (2012); Lebanese League champion (2010); Arab Club champion (2010); 2× Big South Player of the Year (2007, 2008)

Arizona "AZ" Reid III (born March 11, 1986) is an American former professional basketball player. He was the 2006–07 Big South Conference Player of the Year, 2007–08 Preseason Player of the Year, and the 2007–08 Big South Conference Player of the Year.

== Family ==
He is the son of Arizona Reid Jr. and Tressa Smith. AZ has three brothers (Jarron Reid, Tyson Miller and Tyshone Reid) and two sisters (Kesha Smith and Tyshennia Reid). His cousin, Roosevelt Dawkins played basketball at College of Charleston.

Reid came to High Point from Gaffney, South Carolina, where he was a four-year varsity player at Gaffney High School and was featured in numerous basketball magazines, such as SLAM. Notable high school teammates include NFL wide receiver Sidney Rice, who played for the University of South Carolina, made the Pro Bowl in 2009 with the Minnesota Vikings, and won the Super Bowl in 2013 with the Seahawks, as well as Donald Sims, a standout player at Appalachian State University.

== College ==
A 6'5" power forward for the Panthers, Reid is undersized and relies on his drive to get to the boards over players that have been a half a foot taller than him.

In the 2007–2008 season, he became the first player in Big South history to reach the 1,800 point/900 rebound club. On February 18, 2008, Reid became the all-time leader rebound leader in Big South Conference history when he grabbed his third rebound against Coastal Carolina. Days later he joined an elite NCAA club of 2,000 points and 1,000 rebounds in a collegiate career. At the close of the 2007-08 basketball season, Reid is only one of fewer than 100 men's players to ever achieve these milestones together.

On February 24, 2007, in High Point's final regular season game, Reid finished with a career-high matching 32 points and a personal best 25 rebounds vs. Virginia Military Institute. The 25 boards set a new Big South Conference single game record, previously held by Charleston Southern’s Tony Fairley (1987) and Coastal Carolina University’s Moses Sonko (earlier that season). It was also an HPU program Division I record. Reid finished the 2006–07 season with a league leading 13 double-doubles.

Arizona led High Point to a school record 22–10 season with his 21.6 points per game and 9.6 rebounds per game during the 2006-07 regular season.

He ranked first in the BSC in rebounds and is the second leading scorer, averaging 21 points and 9 rebounds per game. Reid was one of only two players in the nation to average 21 points and 9 rebounds. (The other player was Kevin Durant)

Monday February 26, 2007 Arizona Reid was named the 2006-07 Big South Conference Player if the Year. (He received 21 first-place votes from the panel and 283 total points.)

=== Senior year ===
Reid captured Big South Conference Player of the Year laurels for the second time and became the third student to win the prize in consecutive seasons. He also garnered First Team All-Big South honors for the third straight year and was named Second Team All-District 5 by the NABC and first-team All-State by NCCSIA. The league's career rebounding leader (1,013), Reid became the 97th student in college basketball history and the first Big South performer to reach 2,000 points and 1,000 rebounds in a career. Reid led the conference in rebounds (11.0 rpg.) and ranked second in scoring (23.9 ppg.). He stands sixth nationally in both categories. Reid was a first team All-State selection in 2006-07 as well. Reid finished his career as the Big South's fourth ranked career scorer and he ends his historic HPU career with 2,069 points. He was also the first Conference performer to average over 20 points and 10 rebounds per game.

AZ Reid was invited to play in the Portsmouth Invitational Tournament (P.I.T.), he led his team K&D Round's Landscaping to a 3rd-place finish.

On May 3, 2008, Reid graduated from High Point University with a Bachelor of Science degree in Recreation Management.

== Professional career ==
On August 24, 2008, Reid signed a contract to play professional basketball in Italy with Pallacanestro Varese without playing any games.

In December 2008, he signed a contract to play in Switzerland with Geneva Devils.

In August 2009, he signed a contract to play in Finland with Korihait.

On August 10, 2010, it was announced Reid had signed to play for the Cairns Taipans in Australia for the 2010–11 season. However, a month later, he was sacked by the Taipans after he was charged with drink-driving.

On September 24, 2010, he signed a contract to play professional basketball in Lebanon with Sporting Al Riyadi Beirut playing 6 matches.

At the end of 2010 he returned to Switzerland to play the rest of the season with BBC Monthey.

Reid joined the Rain or Shine Elasto Painters of the Philippine Basketball Association, the first and oldest professional basketball league in Asia, as an import for the 2011 Governors Cup. He was awarded as the best import of the conference even though Rain or Shine did not make the finals.

In 2012, he returned to Switzerland to play for Benetton Fribourg Olympic.

In 2014, he returned to the PBA and he was awarded as the Bobby Parks Best Import of the Conference. He lift the Rain or Shine Elasto Painters to the finals.

On July 9, 2014, he signed with VOO Wolves Verviers-Pepinster of Belgium for the 2014–15 season. In February 2015, he left Pepinster and signed with San Miguel Beermen of Philippines.

On July 17, 2015, Reid finally got his first PBA Championship trophy (as a Beermen) after 4 years playing in the PBA. He helped the Beermen win via a 4–0 sweep against the Alaska Aces in the 2015 Governor's Cup Finals. It was San Miguel's second crown of the 2015 season and 21st in total franchise history.

In October 2015, Reid officially joined Pacquiao Powervit Pilipinas Aguilas (now the Pilipinas MX3 Kings) as an import in the ASEAN Basketball League (ABL) which is set to start on Oct. 27, 2015. In February 2016, he was replaced by Will Creekmore.

In April 2016, Reid returned to San Miguel as the team's import, replacing Tyler Wilkerson. He played only one game for the team in the 2016 PBA Commissioner's Cup: a 99–124 loss against the Rain or Shine Elasto Painters in the 2016 PBA Commissioner's Cup semifinals, which ended his team's conference. However, Reid would return to the team for the 2016 PBA Governors' Cup as the team's import once again. He returned for the third time in July 2018 as the team's import for the 2018 PBA Governors' Cup.

On November 7, 2017, Reid signed with Leuven Bears. Reid averaged 14 points and 6.9 rebounds per game in Belgium. He signed with San Miguel again on August 9, 2018.

On October 26, 2018, Reid returned to Monthey for a second stint. In 27 games played for Monthey, he averaged 17.5 points, 7.8 rebounds, 3.0 assists and 1.1 steals per game.

On August 18, 2019, Reid signed with Elitzur Eito Ashkelon of the Israeli National League for the 2019–20 season.

== PBA career statistics ==
Legend
GP	Games played	MPG	Minutes per game
FG%	Field-goal percentage	3P%	3-point field-goal percentage	FT%	Free-throw percentage
RPG	Rebounds per game	APG	Assists per game	SPG	Steals per game
BPG	Blocks per game	PPG	Points per game	**Bold**	Career high

Year	Team	GP	MPG	FG%	3P%	FT%	RPG	APG	SPG	BPG	PPG
2010–11	Rain or Shine	12	39.6	.468	.259	.667	**15.4**	4.2	1.0	0.5	28.7
2012–13	Rain or Shine	14	37.8	**.479**	.250	.655	14.0	4.1	**0.7**	0.5	**30.4**
2013–14	Rain or Shine	20	38.1	.462	**.342**	**.748**	12.6	3.8	1.3	**0.6**	29.1
2014–15	San Miguel	**28**	**42.0**	.445	.326	.650	9.9	**5.0**	**1.5**	0.4	29.6
Career		74	39.7	.460	.311	.683	12.3	4.4	1.2	0.5	29.5

Source: PBA-Online

== See also ==
- List of NCAA Division I men's basketball players with 2000 points and 1000 rebounds
