= Brian Heruela =

Filipino-American basketball player

Mindoro Tamaraws
- Position: Point guard
- League: MPBL

Personal information
- Born: April 13, 1989 (age 37) Cebu City, Philippines
- Listed height: 5 ft 10 in (1.78 m)
- Listed weight: 195 lb (88 kg)

Career information
- High school: UV (Cebu City)
- College: UC
- PBA draft: 2014: 3rd round, 26th overall pick
- Drafted by: Blackwater Elite
- Playing career: 2014–present

Career history
- 2014–2015: Blackwater Elite
- 2015–2018: San Miguel Beermen
- 2019: TNT KaTropa
- 2019: Blackwater Elite
- 2020: Phoenix Super LPG Fuel Masters
- 2021–2025: TNT Tropang Giga/5G
- 2026: Cebu Greats
- 2026–present: Mindoro Tamaraws

Career highlights
- 7× PBA champion (2015–16 Philippine, 2016–17 Philippine, 2017 Commissioner's, 2017–18 Philippine, 2021 Philippine, 2024 Governors', 2024–25 Commissioner's); 2× CESAFI Champion (2010–2011); 2× CESAFI Mythical Team Member (2010–2011)

Quinton Brian Heruela (born April 13, 1989) is a Filipino-American professional basketball player for the Mindoro Tamaraws of the Maharlika Pilipinas Basketball League (MPBL). He was the 26th pick in the 2014 PBA draft by Blackwater.

== College and amateur career ==
Heruela played for the University of Cebu Webmasters in the Cebu Schools Athletic Foundation, Inc. (CESAFI), winning back-to-back championships in 2010 and 2011 playing alongside future San Miguel Beermen teammate June Mar Fajardo. Heruela also participated in the 2011 Universiade while with the Webmasters.

Before entering the PBA, he played in the PBA D-League. In 2014, he even became one of the candidates for the Aspirants' Cup MVP award by posting near triple-double numbers.

== Professional career ==
=== Blackwater Elite (2014–2015) ===
Heruela was drafted by the Blackwater Elite in 2014 PBA draft. He started his rookie season on Blackwater's reserve list. After getting cut from the team, he returned to the D-League. Blackwater gave him a call after that, and he returned to the team. In his first game, he had five points, seven rebounds, five assists, two blocks, a steal and seven turnovers in over 30 minutes of action. He scored 19 points in a loss to Barako Bull Energy.

In the 2015 Commissioner's Cup, Heruela led the team's locals in scoring and assists, which made him one of the biggest "steals" in the 2014 draft. He also had a career-high 27 points in a win against the KIA Carnival that conference. He also participated in the Obstacle Challenge during the 2015 All-Star Weekend.

=== San Miguel Beermen (2015–2018) ===
On July 2, 2015, Brian Heruela was traded by the Blackwater Elite to the Barako Bull Energy in exchange for Carlo Lastimosa. However, on August 25, 2015, Heruela was traded by the Barako Bull Energy to the San Miguel Beermen for Jeric Fortuna, reuniting him with his former college teammate at University of Cebu, June Mar Fajardo. He became the backup point guard in SMB's rotation. He still found ways to contribute, such as when he got a rare start in a win over the GlobalPort Batang Pier in the 2016–17 Philippine Cup. In the 2017 Commissioner's Cup Finals, he was instrumental in limiting TNT's Jayson Castro. He won 2 championships that season.

In a 2017–18 Philippine Cup win over Globalport, Heruela had a career-high six steals and 17 points as he stepped up with guard Alex Cabagnot out with a foot injury. He, along with the SMB bench, also stepped up in the Finals, as SMB eventually won its 4th straight All-Filipino Cup.

=== TNT KaTropa (2018–2019) ===
On December 19, 2018, Heruela, along with David Semerad and a 2020 1st-round pick, was traded to the TNT Katropa in exchange for Terrence Romeo. He debuted with 14 points and two steals in a loss to the Beermen. In the 2019 Commissioner's Cup playoffs, he defended Ginebra's star scorer Stanley Pringle while contributing with his three-point shooting on offense to help TNT advance to the Finals. In Game 1 of the Finals, which was against his former team SMB, he had a highlight block on San Miguel import Chris McCullough, and helped TNT win that game. In Game 2 however, he missed two crucial free throws that allowed the Beermen to send the game to overtime where they won. TNT eventually lost the Finals in six games. He revealed that he injured his right shoulder during the Finals, which caused him to miss some games the following conference.

=== Return to Blackwater Elite (2019) ===
On October 19, 2019, he was traded back to the Blackwater Elite in exchange for Michael DiGregorio. He debuted with three assists in a loss to the Rain or Shine Elasto Painters.

=== Phoenix Super LPG Fuel Masters (2020) ===
On January 16, 2020, the Elite traded Heruela to the Phoenix Super LPG Fuel Masters in exchange for Ron Dennison. He then signed a one-year deal with them. He had 15 points and seven rebounds to go along with his 4 out of 6 output from threes in a win over his former team Blackwater.

=== Return to TNT (2021–2025) ===
On February 23, 2021, Heruela, along with three future draft picks, was traded to the Alaska Aces for Vic Manuel and two draft picks. However, he didn't sign with Alaska and signed with TNT instead, making a return to the franchise he last played for in 2019. In Game 3 of the 2021 Philippine Cup Finals against the Magnolia Hotshots, he was called for fouling Paul Lee on a three-point attempt, despite not being near Lee's shooting hand or landing spot. Magnolia eventually won that game. The referee who called the foul on him was not allowed to officiate again the rest of the Finals. TNT still won the Philippine Cup, their sixth All-Filipino title.

The following season, TNT reached the All-Filipino Finals once again, but TNT failed to defend its title, losing it to the Beermen. Heruela then missed the Governors' Cup due to a foot injury with "cartilage defects".

=== Cebu Greats (2026) ===
In April 2026, Heruela entered regional basketball, joining his hometown Cebu Greats in the Maharlika Pilipinas Basketball League.

== PBA career statistics ==
Legend
GP	Games played	MPG	Minutes per game	FG%	Field-goal percentage
3FG%	3-point field-goal percentage	4P%	4-point field-goal percentage	FT%	Free-throw percentage
RPG	Rebounds per game	APG	Assists per game	SPG	Steals per game
BPG	Blocks per game	PPG	Points per game	127	Career high

As of the end of 2024–25 season

=== Season-by-season averages ===
Year	Team	GP	MPG	FG%	3P%	4P%	FT%	RPG	APG	SPG	BPG	PPG
2014–15	Blackwater	26	33.2	.431	.203	—	.617	4.9	5.2	1.5	.3	10.6
2015–16	San Miguel	37	7.4	.337	.300	—	.625	1.1	1.0	.4	.0	2.0
2016–17	San Miguel	40	8.5	.361	.257	—	.684	1.4	.9	.4	.1	2.1
2017–18	San Miguel	47	9.8	.380	.319	—	.759	1.7	1.4	.6	.2	3.2
2019	TNT	44	20.3	.347	.286	—	.558	2.7	2.3	1.1	.2	4.6
2019	Blackwater	44	20.3	.347	.286	—	.558	2.7	2.3	1.1	.2	4.6
2020	Phoenix Super LPG	17	19.9	.398	.341	—	.524	2.9	2.1	.8	.2	5.4
2021	TNT	36	13.8	.367	.313	—	.250	1.8	1.1	.7	.1	2.8
2022–23	TNT	13	15.4	.316	.222	—	.750	3.0	1.7	.9	.1	2.4
2023–24	TNT	23	11.8	.375	.355	—	.571	1.2	1.5	.3	.1	2.5
2024–25	TNT	59	10.5	.310	.220	.000	.750	1.6	1.0	.5	—	1.4
Career		342	13.9	.372	.281	.000	.617	2.0	1.7	.7	.1	3.4

== Personal life ==
Heruela is known in the PBA for his hairstyles. While he was still with SMB, he wore cornrows, with his teammates also joining in on the trend. During the 2019 Commissioner's Cup Finals, he drew comparisons to Toronto guard Fred VanVleet, not just for their similar play and impacts on their teams, but also because of their similar beards.
