= 2017 PBA Commissioner's Cup finals =

Philippine Basketball tournament

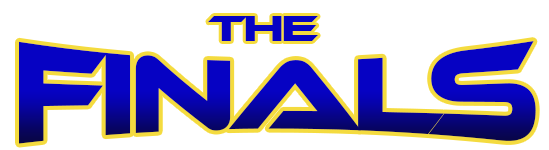
| Team | Coach | Wins |
|---|---|---|
| (2) San Miguel Beermen | Leo Austria | 4 |
| (4) TNT KaTropa | Nash Racela | 2 |
- Dates: June 21 – July 2, 2017
- MVP: Alex Cabagnot (San Miguel Beermen)
- Television: Local: Sports5; TV5; PBA Rush (HD); International: AksyonTV International
- Announcers: see Broadcast notes
- Radio network: Radyo5 (DWFM)
- Announcers: see Broadcast notes

Referees
- Game 1: P. Balao, S. Pineda, R. Yante, M. Montoya
- Game 2: N. Quilinguen, J. Mariano, R. Gruta, B. Oliva
- Game 3: P. Balao, E. Tangkion, M. Montoya, M. Flordeliza
- Game 4: J. Mariano, S. Pineda, B. Oliva, M. Lasaga
- Game 5: P. Balao, N. Guevarra, R. Yante, M. Orioste
- Game 6: N. Quilinguen, E. Tangkion, R. Gruta, B. Oliva

PBA Commissioner's Cup finals chronology
- < 2016 2018 >

PBA finals chronology
- < 2016–17 Philippine 2017 Governors' >

The 2017 Philippine Basketball Association (PBA) Commissioner's Cup finals was the best-of-7 championship series of the 2017 PBA Commissioner's Cup and the conclusion of the conference's playoffs. The San Miguel Beermen and the TNT KaTropa competed for the 17th Commissioner's Cup championship and the 120th overall championship contested by the league.

== Background ==
San Miguel, coming off a title in the 2016–17 Philippine Cup, signed international veteran Charles Rhodes as their import. Alongside Rhodes, leading the way for them were three-time MVP June Mar Fajardo and the guard duo of Alex Cabagnot and Chris Ross, who were both in the running for the Best Player of the Conference award. This was San Miguel's first Commissioner's Cup finals appearance in 16 years.

TNT, on the other hand, accomplished a semifinal appearance in first-year head coach Nash Racela's debut conference. They signed Denzel Bowles as their import, who had led the then B-Meg Llamados to the 2012 Commissioner's Cup title. Leading the way for TNT was Jayson Castro, alongside a young core of RR Pogoy (a rookie second among the team's locals in scoring), Troy Rosario, and Moala Tautuaa. Throughout the elimination round, TNT changed their import three times as Bowles was swapped for Lou Amundson, then Donté Greene, before settling on Joshua Smith. As the fourth seed, they defeated the Meralco Bolts and Barangay Ginebra for their first finals appearance since 2015. However, Smith suffered a foot injury in the semifinals, putting his health in question for the finals.

=== Road to the finals ===
| San Miguel Beermen | | TNT KaTropa |
|---|---|---|
| Finished 9–2 (.818): Tied with Barangay Ginebra and Star at 1st place | Elimination round | Finished 8–3 (.727): 4th place |
| 1–1 (2nd place) | Tiebreaker* | bye |
| Def. Phoenix in one game, 115–96 (twice-to-beat advantage) | Quarterfinals | Def. Meralco, 2–1 |
| Def. Star, 3–1 | Semifinals | Def. Barangay Ginebra, 3–1 |

=== Head-to-head matchup ===
May 5
7:00 PM

Box score

TNT KaTropa 112, San Miguel Beermen 103
Scoring by quarter: 27–16, 26–26, 26–28, 33–33
| Pts: Greene 41; Rebs: Greene 21; Asts: Greene, Rosales 4 | Pts: Rhodes 43; Rebs: Cabagnot, Rhodes 8 Asts: Ross 10 |

Smart Araneta Coliseum, Quezon City
Referees: P. Balao, N. Guevarra, R. Gruta, R. Yante

== Series summary ==
| Game | Date | Venue | Winner | Result |
|---|---|---|---|---|
| Game 1 | June 21 | Smart Araneta Coliseum | TNT | 104–102 |
| Game 2 | June 23 | Smart Araneta Coliseum | San Miguel | 102–88 |
| Game 3 | June 25 | Smart Araneta Coliseum | San Miguel | 109–97 |
| Game 4 | June 28 | Smart Araneta Coliseum | TNT | 102–97 |
| Game 5 | June 30 | Smart Araneta Coliseum | San Miguel | 111–102 |
| Game 6 | July 2 | Smart Araneta Coliseum | San Miguel | 115–91 |

== Game summaries ==
=== Game 1 ===
June 21
7:00pm

Box score

San Miguel Beermen 102, TNT KaTropa 104
Scoring by quarter: 31–24, 20–32, 22–19, 29–29
| Pts: Rhodes 31; Rebs: Fajardo, Rhodes 13; Asts: Ross 12 | Pts: Pogoy 27; Rebs: Castro, Smith 9 Asts: Castro 10 |
TNT leads series, 1–0

Smart Araneta Coliseum, Quezon City
Referees: P. Balao, S. Pineda, R. Yante, M. Montoya

=== Game 2 ===
June 23
7:00pm

Box score

San Miguel Beermen 102, TNT KaTropa 88
Scoring by quarter: 24–32, 28–11, 38–19, 12–26
| Pts: Fajardo 22; Rebs: Fajardo, Rhodes 11; Asts: Ross 9 | Pts: Castro 14; Rebs: Tautuaa, Williams 7 Asts: Smith 5 |
Series tied, 1–1

Smart Araneta Coliseum, Quezon City
Referees: N. Quilinguen, J. Mariano, R. Gruta, B. Oliva

=== Game 3 ===
June 25
6:30pm

Box score

San Miguel Beermen 109, TNT KaTropa 97
Scoring by quarter: 23–23, 23–24, 33–25, 30–25
| Pts: Cabagnot 28; Rebs: Rhodes 20; Asts: Lassiter 7 | Pts: Garcia 19; Rebs: Smith 14; Asts: Garcia 4 |
San Miguel leads, 2–1

Smart Araneta Coliseum, Quezon City
Referees: P. Balao, E. Tangkion, M. Montoya, M. Flordeliza

=== Game 4 ===
June 28
7:00pm

Box score

San Miguel Beermen 97, TNT KaTropa 102
Scoring by quarter: 24–27, 23–22, 29–24, 21–29
| Pts: Rhodes 22; Rebs: Fajardo 9 Asts: Cabagnot 5 | Pts: Smith 20; Rebs: Smith 15; Asts: Reyes 4 |
Series tied, 2–2

Smart Araneta Coliseum, Quezon City
Referees: J. Mariano, S. Pineda, B. Oliva, M. Lasaga

Prior to the game, San Miguel's Chris Ross was awarded his first Best Player of the Conference award, beating his teammate Alex Cabagnot and TNT's Jayson Castro, to the award.

=== Game 5 ===
June 30
7:00pm

Box score

San Miguel Beermen 111, TNT KaTropa 102
Scoring by quarter: 29–26, 17–35, 36–18, 29–23
| Pts: Cabagnot 28; Rebs: Rhodes 14; Asts: Ross 11 | Pts: de Ocampo 19; Rebs: Rosario, Smith 7 Asts: Castro 12 |
San Miguel leads, 3–2

Smart Araneta Coliseum, Quezon City
Referees: P. Balao, N. Guevarra, R. Yante, M. Orioste

=== Game 6 ===
July 2
6:30pm

Box score

San Miguel Beermen 115, TNT KaTropa 91
Scoring by quarter: 37–26, 25–16, 32–27, 21–22
| Pts: Rhodes 30; Rebs: Cabagnot 12; Asts: Cabagnot 11 | Pts: Rosario 21; Rebs: Williams 8 Asts: five players 2 |
San Miguel wins series, 4–2

Smart Araneta Coliseum, Quezon City
Referees: N. Quilinguen, E. Tangkion, R. Gruta, B. Oliva

== Rosters ==
San Miguel Beermen roster
Players
Coaches

| Pos. | # | POB | Name | Height | Weight | DOB (YYYY–MM–DD) | From |
|---|---|---|---|---|---|---|---|
| F/C | 0 | (United States) | Charles Rhodes (I) | 6 ft 9 in (2.06 m) | 240 lb (109 kg) | 1985–06–25 | Mississippi State |
| G | 1 | (Philippines) | Brian Heruela | 5 ft 10 in (1.78 m) | 195 lb (88 kg) | 1989–04–13 | Cebu |
| G | 2 | (United States) | Rashawn McCarthy (R) | 6 ft 0 in (1.83 m) | 175 lb (79 kg) | 1989–09–10 | SUNY–Old Westbury |
| F/C | 4 | (Philippines) | Jay-R Reyes | 6 ft 7 in (2.01 m) | 225 lb (102 kg) | 1984–07–16 | UP Diliman |
| G | 5 | (Philippines) | Alex Cabagnot | 6 ft 0 in (1.83 m) | 185 lb (84 kg) | 1982–12–08 | Hawaiʻi–Hilo |
| G | 6 | (United States) | Chris Ross | 6 ft 2 in (1.88 m) | 180 lb (82 kg) | 1985–03–09 | Marshall |
| C | 7 | (Germany) | Arnold Van Opstal (R) | 6 ft 9 in (2.06 m) | 220 lb (100 kg) | 1991–12–15 | De La Salle |
| G/F | 13 | (United States) | Marcio Lassiter | 6 ft 2 in (1.88 m) | 185 lb (84 kg) | 1987–05–16 | Cal State Fullerton |
| C | 15 | (Philippines) | June Mar Fajardo | 6 ft 11 in (2.11 m) | 268 lb (122 kg) | 1989–11–17 | Cebu |
| G/F | 22 | (Philippines) | Matt Ganuelas-Rosser (IN) | 6 ft 5 in (1.96 m) | 186 lb (84 kg) | 1990–06–13 | Cal Poly Pomona |
| G/F | 23 | (Philippines) | Keith Agovida | 6 ft 2 in (1.88 m) | 170 lb (77 kg) | 1990–02–14 | Arellano |
| F | 27 | (Philippines) | Gabby Espinas | 6 ft 4 in (1.93 m) | 208 lb (94 kg) | 1982–01–03 | Philippine Christian |
| F | 28 | (Philippines) | Michael Mabulac (IN) | 6 ft 4 in (1.93 m) | 218 lb (99 kg) | 1991–10–31 | José Rizal |
| F | 29 | (Philippines) | Arwind Santos (C) | 6 ft 4 in (1.93 m) | 175 lb (79 kg) | 1981–06–10 | Far Eastern |
| F | 33 | (Australia) | David Semerad | 6 ft 4 in (1.93 m) | 220 lb (100 kg) | 1991–04–25 | San Beda |
| G/F | 71 | (Philippines) | Ronald Tubid | 6 ft 1 in (1.85 m) | 185 lb (84 kg) | 1981–10–15 | UE |
| C | 95 | (Philippines) | Yancy de Ocampo | 6 ft 9 in (2.06 m) | 245 lb (111 kg) | 1980–03–11 | Saint Francis of Assisi |

Head coach

- (Philippines) Leo Austria

Assistant coach(es)

- (Philippines) Peter Martin (1st Assistant)
- (Philippines) Biboy Ravanes
- (Philippines) Dayong Mendoza
- (Philippines) Boyzie Zamar
- (Philippines) Renato Agustin
- (Philippines) Jorge Gallent

Team manager

- (Philippines) Gelacio Abanilla
- (Philippines) Daniel Henares (Assistant)

Legend

- (C) Team captain
- (CI) Commissioner's Cup Import
- (GI) Governors' Cup Import
- (EI) EASL Import
- (DP) Unsigned draft pick
- (FA) Free agent
- (IN) Inactive
- (S) Suspended
- (R) Rookie
- Injured

Roster

TNT KaTropa roster
Players
Coaches

| Pos. | # | POB | Name | Height | Weight | DOB (YYYY–MM–DD) | From |
|---|---|---|---|---|---|---|---|
| G | 1 | (United States) | Kris Rosales | 6 ft 0 in (1.83 m) | 165 lb (75 kg) | 1990–12–20 | Hope International |
| F/C | 2 | (Philippines) | Frank Golla | 6 ft 5 in (1.96 m) | 290 lb (132 kg) | 1990–01–17 | Ateneo |
| F | 4 | (United States) | Harvey Carey | 6 ft 3 in (1.91 m) | 210 lb (95 kg) | 1979–03–18 | Sonoma State |
| G/F | 6 | (Philippines) | Alex Nuyles | 6 ft 2 in (1.88 m) | 199 lb (90 kg) | 1989–07–05 | Adamson |
| F/C | 7 | (United States) | Moala Tautuaa | 6 ft 8 in (2.03 m) | 245 lb (111 kg) | 1989–04–30 | Chadron State |
| G | 8 | (Philippines) | RR Garcia | 5 ft 11 in (1.80 m) | 165 lb (75 kg) | 1990–01–12 | Far Eastern |
| G | 9 | (Philippines) | Levi Hernandez (R) | 6 ft 1 in (1.85 m) | 190 lb (86 kg) | 1990–03–09 | Arellano |
| G | 10 | (Philippines) | Ryan Reyes | 6 ft 2 in (1.88 m) | 190 lb (86 kg) | 1983–08–10 | Cal State Fullerton |
| F | 14 | (Australia) | Anthony Semerad | 6 ft 4 in (1.93 m) | 220 lb (100 kg) | 1991–04–25 | San Beda |
| G/F | 16 | (Philippines) | Roger Pogoy (R) | 6 ft 2 in (1.88 m) | 180 lb (82 kg) | 1992–06–16 | Far Eastern |
| G | 17 | (Philippines) | Jayson Castro | 5 ft 10 in (1.78 m) | 185 lb (84 kg) | 1986–06–30 | Philippine Christian |
| F/C | 18 | (Philippines) | Troy Rosario | 6 ft 7 in (2.01 m) | 200 lb (91 kg) | 1992–01–20 | National-U |
| F/C | 21 | (United States) | Kelly Williams | 6 ft 6 in (1.98 m) | 215 lb (98 kg) | 1982–02–07 | Oakland |
| G | 25 | (Philippines) | Alfrancis Tamsi (R) | 6 ft 1 in (1.85 m) | 158 lb (72 kg) | 1992–03–25 | Far Eastern |
| F | 33 | (Philippines) | Ranidel de Ocampo (C) | 6 ft 6 in (1.98 m) | 210 lb (95 kg) | 1981–12–08 | Saint Francis of Assisi |
| C | 34 | (United States) | Joshua Smith (I) | 6 ft 10 in (2.08 m) | 350 lb (159 kg) | 1992–05–14 | Georgetown |

Head coach

- (Philippines) Nash Racela

Assistant coach(es)

- (Philippines) Joshua Reyes (1st Assistant)
- (Philippines) Bong Ravena
- (Philippines) Gilbert Lao
- (United States) Alton Lister

Team manager

- (Philippines) Virgil Villavicencio
- (Philippines) Magnum Membrere (Assistant)

Legend

- (C) Team captain
- (CI) Commissioner's Cup Import
- (GI) Governors' Cup Import
- (EI) EASL Import
- (DP) Unsigned draft pick
- (FA) Free agent
- (IN) Inactive
- (S) Suspended
- (R) Rookie
- Injured

Roster

== Broadcast notes ==
The Philippine Cup Finals was aired on TV5 with simulcasts on PBA Rush (both in standard and high definition). TV5's radio arm, Radyo5 provided the radio play-by-play coverage.

Sports5 also provided online livestreaming via their official YouTube account using the TV5 feed.

The PBA Rush broadcast provided English-language coverage of the Finals.

| Game | Sports5 | | | PBA Rush (English) | | |
| Game | Play-by-play | Analyst(s) | Courtside reporters | Play-by-play | Analyst(s) | Courtside reporters |
|---|---|---|---|---|---|---|
| Game 1 | Magoo Marjon | Andy Jao and Yeng Guiao | Rizza Diaz | Jutt Sulit | Ali Peek | Apple David |
| Game 2 | Anthony Suntay | Andy Jao and Ryan Gregorio | Selina Dagdag | Chiqui Reyes | Charles Tiu | Chino Lui Pio |
| Game 3 | Sev Sarmenta | Ryan Gregorio and Dominic Uy | Sel Guevara | James Velasquez | Don Allado | Carla Lizardo |
| Game 4 | Charlie Cuna | Eric Reyes and Jason Webb | Rizza Diaz | Jutt Sulit | Chuck Araneta | Mara Aquino |
| Game 5 | Sev Sarmenta | Andy Jao and Ryan Gregorio | Selina Dagdag | Carlo Pamintuan | Jong Uichico | Apple David |
| Game 6 | Magoo Marjon | Dominic Uy and Yeng Guiao | Rizza Diaz | Chiqui Reyes | Jong Uichico | Chino Lui Pio |

- Additional Game 6 crew:
  - Trophy presentation: James Velasquez
  - Dugout celebration interviewer: Sel Guevara
