= Keith Agovida =

Filipino basketball player (born 1990)

Free agent
- Position: Shooting guard / small forward

Personal information
- Born: February 14, 1990 (age 36) Casiguran, Aurora, Philippines
- Listed height: 6 ft 2 in (1.88 m)
- Listed weight: 170 lb (77 kg)

Career information
- High school: JRU (Mandaluyong)
- College: Arellano
- PBA draft: 2015: 4th round, 34th overall pick
- Drafted by: Blackwater Elite
- Playing career: 2015–present

Career history
- 2015–2016: Blackwater Elite
- 2016: Mahindra Enforcer
- 2016–2018: San Miguel Beermen
- 2019–2020: Columbian Dyip / Terrafirma Dyip
- 2021–2023: Davao Occidental Tigers
- 2023: Makati OKBet Kings
- 2024: Rizal Golden Coolers
- 2024: Davao Occidental Tigers
- 2025: San Juan Knights / Kings

Career highlights
- 3× PBA champion (2016–17 Philippine, 2017 Commissioner's, 2017–18 Philippine); PSL champion (2022)

Keith Jasper Moral Agovida (born February 14, 1990) is a Filipino professional basketball former player for the San Juan Knights franchise of the Maharlika Pilipinas Basketball League (MPBL) and Pilipinas Super League (PSL). He was drafted 34th overall by Blackwater Elite in the 2015 PBA draft.

== High school career ==
In 2007, Agovida was the NCAA Juniors Rookie of the Year and Defensive Player of the Year. The following season, he had 37 points and 15 rebounds in a win against the CSB–LSGH Greenies. Then, he scored a career high 82 points for the JRU Light Bombers in a win over the Malayan Red Robins, becoming the NCAA's highest scorer. They lost their final elimination round game to the San Sebastian Staglets in overtime, as he managed just 21 points in their final game. They lost to the Letran Squires in the playoffs. He finished his season by winning MVP, Most Improved Player, the Defensive Player of the Year and a spot in the elite Mythical First Team.

In 2009, Agovida was invited to the Nike Elite Camp in 2009 along with other high school standouts and future PBA draft batchmates. Later that year, his record of most points scored in NCAA history was broken by his teammate Joshua Saret, who had 89 points. He also had a quadruple-double, as aside from his high total of points, he also had 11 rebounds, 12 assists and 13 steals.

== College career ==
He was unable to play for De La Salle and National University because of his academic performance. He then played for the Arellano Chiefs under Coach Koy Banal. In Season 89, he hit two clutch free throws that led to a win over the senior team of his high school, the JRU Heavy Bombers.

In Season 90, he scored 22 points to go with his 10 rebounds in a win over the UPHSD Altas. In a close win over the Letran Knights, he scored eight points in the fourth quarter that helped Arellano get the win. He had 19 points and 10 rebounds in their rematch with Letran which they won once again, eliminating the Knights from playoff contention. Against San Beda, he had 17 points. In their rematch with San Beda for the first seed, he committed an unsportsmanlike foul in that game, and faced suspension. Arellano went on to lose that game. He was not suspended. Arellano met San Beda in that year's finals, and lost to them. He then graduated from college.

== Professional career ==
=== Blackwater Elite ===
Agovida was drafted 34th overall by Blackwater Elite in the 2015 PBA draft. He had applied for the previous draft, but backed out. In his PBA debut, he had 15 points, but lost to the NLEX Road Warriors. He had nine points, six rebounds, four assists, two steals and one block in 20 minutes of a win over the Meralco Bolts.

=== Mahindra Enforcer ===
In 2016, Agovida was traded to the Mahindra Enforcer for Roi Sumang, who had just been traded from the Globalport Batang Pier. He scored 11 points in the second half to help upset the Alaska Aces.

=== San Miguel Beermen ===
In November 2016, Agovida, along with RR Garcia, were traded by Mahindra to the San Miguel Beermen in exchange for Ryan Araña along with a 2018 1st-round pick in a three-team trade. He won two championships during the 2016–17 season, even though he had little to no playing time. He was almost included in a trade that would have sent him back to Mahindra (now known as the Kia Picanto) in exchange for the first overall pick in the 2017 PBA Draft. But the trade pushed through without him. He won one more championship with SMB when they repeated as Philippine Cup champions in 2018.

=== Terrafirma Dyip ===
In 2018, Agovida was traded to the Columbian Dyip in exchange for Ronald Tubid. He last played for them in the 2020 Philippine Cup.

=== Davao Occidental Tigers (2021–2023) ===
In 2021, Agovida was signed by the Davao Occidental Tigers. During the FilBasket Subic Championship, he scored 18 in a rout of the Muntinlupa Defenders. They made it to the semifinals, as he missed a free throw that could have won them a spot in the Finals.

The Tigers then moved to the PSL. Davao won the conference championship.

He is set to play for them once again as the rebranded Davao Pilipinas represent the Philippines in the ASEAN Basketball League (ABL). However, those plans fell through and the Zamboanga Valientes became the new Philippine representatives for the ABL.

== PBA career statistics ==
Legend
GP	Games played	MPG	Minutes per game
FG%	Field-goal percentage	3P%	3-point field-goal percentage	FT%	Free-throw percentage
RPG	Rebounds per game	APG	Assists per game	SPG	Steals per game
BPG	Blocks per game	PPG	Points per game	**Bold**	Career high

As of the end of 2020 season

=== Season-by-season averages ===
Year	Team	GP	MPG	FG%	3P%	FT%	RPG	APG	SPG	BPG	PPG
2015–16	Blackwater	**26**	**10.2**	**.434**	**.167**	.824	**2.0**	**.9**	**.3**	**.2**	**3.9**
2015–16	Mahindra	**26**	**10.2**	**.434**	**.167**	.824	**2.0**	**.9**	**.3**	**.2**	**3.9**
2016–17	San Miguel	23	6.9	.375	.000	.500	1.4	.4	.2	**.2**	1.7
2017–18	San Miguel	6	1.7	.000	—	**1.000**	.7	.0	.0	**.2**	.3
2019	Columbian	20	8.5	.400	.000	.400	1.9	.7	.2	**.2**	2.2
2020	Terrafirma	7	5.5	.250	.000	—	.7	.0	.0	.1	.3
Career		82	7.8	.405	.063	.632	1.6	.6	.2	.2	2.3
