= 2016–17 PBA Philippine Cup finals =

Basketball cup finals

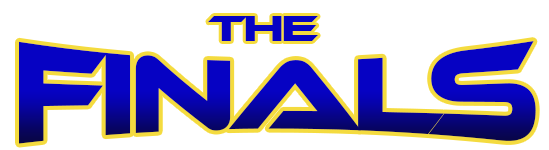
Team	Coach	Wins
(1) San Miguel Beermen	Leo Austria	4
(7) Barangay Ginebra San Miguel	Tim Cone	1
- Dates: February 24 – March 5, 2017
- MVP: Chris Ross (San Miguel Beermen)
- Television: Local: Sports5; TV5; PBA Rush (HD); International: AksyonTV International
- Announcers: see Broadcast notes
- Radio network: Radyo5 (DWFM)
- Announcers: see Broadcast notes

PBA Philippine Cup finals chronology
- < 2015–16 2017–18 >

PBA finals chronology
- < 2016 Governors' 2017 Commissioner's >

The 2016–17 Philippine Basketball Association (PBA) Philippine Cup finals was the best-of-7 championship series of the 2016–17 PBA Philippine Cup, and the conclusion of the conference's playoffs. The San Miguel Beermen and Barangay Ginebra San Miguel competed for the 39th Philippine Cup championship and the 119th overall championship contested by the league.

The championship series was also the 5th time (first since the 2009 Fiesta Conference finals) that the two teams met in the finals.

San Miguel won the finals series, four games to one, winning their third straight Philippine Cup championship. The Beermen will also have permanent possession of the second version of the Jun Bernardino Trophy.

== Background ==
=== San Miguel Beermen ===
San Miguel is the defending champions of the Philippine Cup for the past two seasons and they are gunning for their third straight Philippine Cup championship. A third straight championship will enable them to keep permanent possession of the Jun Bernardino Trophy.

The Beermen finished the elimination round with a 10–1 record, losing only to the Phoenix Fuel Masters. Their elimination round record assured them of the twice-to-beat advantage into the quarterfinals. They beat the Rain or Shine Elasto Painters, 98–91, to advance to the semifinals facing TNT KaTropa. TNT incidentally was the first team to have permanent possession of the Jun Bernardino Trophy after winning three straight Philippine Cup championships from 2011 to 2013.

San Miguel and TNT endured a seven-game semifinals series, with the Beermen winning the pivotal seventh game, 96–83.

=== Barangay Ginebra San Miguel ===
Barangay Ginebra struggled in the first part of the elimination round and finished with a 6–5 record. Due to inferior quotient, the Gin Kings got the 7th seed, having a twice-to-win disadvantage going into the quarterfinals. The faced the Alaska Aces and won two straight games in order for them to advance to the semifinals. The Gin Kings were up against rival Star Hotshots on a Manila Clasico semifinal series. Star won the first two games before Ginebra won the next two games, eventually tying the series, 2–2. In Game 5, Star once again won and Ginebra was on a verge of elimination. Ginebra was able to force a do-or-die seventh game after winning Game 6. Barangay Ginebra eventually won Game 7, 89–76.

The Gin Kings played four do-or-die games (two in the quarterfinals against Alaska and two against Star) before reaching the finals for the second consecutive time since they won the Governors' Cup a season ago.

=== Road to the finals ===
San Miguel Beermen		Barangay Ginebra San Miguel
Finished 10–1 (.909): 1st place	Elimination round	Finished 6–5 (.545): Tied with TNT, GlobalPort and Phoenix at 4th place
bye	Tiebreaker*	.94 (7th place)
Def. Rain or Shine in one game, 98–91 (twice-to-beat advantage)	Quarterfinals	Def. Alaska in two games, 85–81 and 108–97 (twice-to-win disadvantage)
Def. TNT, 4–3	Semifinals	Def. Star, 4–3

=== Elimination round matchup ===
January 8
6:45 PM

Box score

San Miguel Beermen 72, Barangay Ginebra San Miguel 70
Scoring by quarter: 15–17, 17–14, 21–18, 19–21
Pts: Cabagnot 16; Rebs: Lassiter 13; Asts: Lassiter 4	Pts: Aguilar 17; Rebs: Aguilar 11; Asts: Tenorio 4

Smart Araneta Coliseum, Quezon City
Referees: P. Balao, J. Mariano, B. Oliva, J. Nicandro

== Series summary ==
Game	Date	Venue	Winner	Result
Game 1	Friday, February 24	Mall of Asia Arena	San Miguel	109–82
Game 2	Sunday, February 26	Quezon Convention Center	Barangay Ginebra	124–118 (OT)
Game 3	Wednesday, March 1	Smart Araneta Coliseum	San Miguel	99–88
Game 4	Friday, March 3	Smart Araneta Coliseum	San Miguel	94–85
Game 5	Sunday, March 5	Smart Araneta Coliseum	San Miguel	91–85

== Game summaries ==
=== Game 1 ===
Sports5

February 24
7:00pm

Stats

San Miguel Beermen 109, Barangay Ginebra San Miguel 82
Scoring by quarter: 35–12, 25–27, 29–17, 20–26
Pts: Fajardo, Ross 17; Rebs: Fajardo 8 Asts: Ross 8	Pts: Ellis 13; Rebs: Devance, Jamito 6 Asts: Thompson 5
San Miguel leads series, 1–0

Mall of Asia Arena, Pasay

After Ginebra took a 2–1 lead, San Miguel had a 16–0 run and finished the first quarter with a double digit lead, 35–12. The Beermen then pushed the lead as much as 36 points in one point of the game. Ginebra tried to orchestrate a run of their own but they cannot decrease the lead to 25 points, despite the absence of the Beermen's starters in the fourth quarter. Alex Cabagnot, Chris Ross and June Mar Fajardo scored in double figures in the first half.

=== Game 2 ===
Sports5

February 26
6:30pm

Stats

San Miguel Beermen 118, Barangay Ginebra San Miguel 124 (OT)
Scoring by quarter: 20–28, 23–39, 39–18, 28–25, Overtime: 8–14
Pts: Santos 23; Rebs: Santos 15; Asts: Ross 11	Pts: Aguilar 23; Rebs: Thompson 18; Asts: Mercado, Thompson 8
Series tied, 1–1

Quezon Convention Center, Lucena, Quezon
Attendance: 8,000

Ginebra was able to pull ahead in the first half of the game, leading by as much as 26 points in the second quarter. San Miguel started their own run at the start of the third quarter. During the scoring run, Marcio Lassiter was given a technical foul and eventually ejected after taunting Sol Mercado upon making a three-point shot. Lassiter was earlier called for a flagrant foul on Kevin Ferrer in the first half.

Nevertheless, San Miguel was able to pull back out and decrease the lead to three points, 85–82, going into the fourth quarter. The Beermen were able to tie the game via a three-point shot from Arwind Santos, 106-all, with 48 seconds remaining in regulation. Japeth Aguilar responded with two free throws shots to give Ginebra a two-point lead. After a San Miguel timeout, Gabby Espinas uncorks a three-point shot, giving them a one-point lead. Ginebra had a chance to regain the lead when Aguilar tried a three-point shot but missed. The Gin Kings were forced to foul Ronald Tubid who split his charity shots. With 3.2 seconds remaining and Ginebra with possession, Joe Devance drove to the basket and missed his layup with Arwind Santos defending the basket. Devance got the rebound and made a follow-up basket before the buzzer sounded to force the game into overtime.

In the extension period, Ginebra made an 8–2 run with three minutes remaining but San Miguel had a 6–0 run from two three point field goals from Ronald Tubid, tying the game again 118-all with 1:40 remaining. Ginebra eventually pulled away with the victory following the scoring run led by Aguilar, Scottie Thompson and Sol Mercado.

=== Game 3 ===
Sports5

March 1
7:00pm

Stats

San Miguel Beermen 99, Barangay Ginebra San Miguel 88
Scoring by quarter: 19–24, 25–25, 25–17, 30–22
Pts: Ross 24; Rebs: Fajardo 18; Asts: Ross 8	Pts: Tenorio 16; Rebs: three players 7 each Asts: Devance, Tenorio 5
San Miguel leads series, 2–1

Smart Araneta Coliseum, Quezon City
Attendance: 16,773

Ginebra was able to take the lead most in the first half, reaching by as much as 12 points early in the second quarter. San Miguel erased the lead and tied the game at 58-all by the third quarter. The lead went back and forth into the fourth quarter until the Beermen closed out the game with a 12–0 run starting at the 5 minute mark of the game.

=== Game 4 ===
Sports5

March 3
7:00pm

Stats

San Miguel Beermen 94, Barangay Ginebra San Miguel 85
Scoring by quarter: 30–18, 25–16, 21–29, 18–22
Pts: Fajardo, Lassiter 20; Rebs: Fajardo 13; Asts: Ross 9	Pts: Devance 22; Rebs: Thompson 10; Asts: Thompson 7
San Miguel leads series, 3–1

Smart Araneta Coliseum, Quezon City
Attendance: 17,146

Prior the game, Beermen's center June Mar Fajardo was awarded his fifth Best Player of the Conference award, tying the record of former Beermen Danny Ildefonso.

San Miguel pulled out in the first five minutes of the game with a 20–2 run. The lead reached up to 26 points in the third quarter. A late game run was orchestrated by Ginebra in the fourth quarter, decreasing the lead to 9 points, 92–83 into the last two minutes of the game. Turnovers by Joe Devance and Mark Caguioa halted a possible Ginebra comeback.

=== Game 5 ===
Sports5

March 5
6:30pm

Stats

San Miguel Beermen 91, Barangay Ginebra San Miguel 85
Scoring by quarter: 27–21, 24–20, 12–20, 28–24
Pts: Fajardo, Santos 21; Rebs: Ross, Santos 8 Asts: Ross 10	Pts: Aguilar 26; Rebs: Aguilar 16; Asts: Devance 8
San Miguel wins series, 4–1

Smart Araneta Coliseum, Quezon City
Attendance: 20,217

San Miguel led most of the game for the first three quarters. Barangay Ginebra was able to decrease the lead to one point, 84–83 after a three-point basket from LA Tenorio, with 2:28 remaining in the game. The Beermen pulled away with the victory after a 7–0 run led by June Mar Fajardo, Chris Ross and Arwind Santos. San Miguel won their third straight Philippine Cup championship in five games.

Chris Ross won the finals MVP award, with finals averages of 17.2 points, 5.2 rebounds, 9.2 assists and 1.8 steals per game.

== Rosters ==
San Miguel Beermen roster
Players
Coaches

Pos.	#	POB	Name	Height	Weight	DOB (YYYY–MM–DD)	From
G	1	(Philippines)	Brian Heruela	5 ft 10 in (1.78 m)	195 lb (88 kg)	1989–04–13	Cebu
G	2	(United States)	Rashawn McCarthy (R)	6 ft 0 in (1.83 m)	175 lb (79 kg)	1989–09–10	SUNY–Old Westbury
F/C	4	(Philippines)	Jay-R Reyes	6 ft 7 in (2.01 m)	225 lb (102 kg)	1984–07–16	UP Diliman
G	5	(Philippines)	Alex Cabagnot	6 ft 0 in (1.83 m)	185 lb (84 kg)	1982–12–08	Hawaiʻi–Hilo
G	6	(United States)	Chris Ross	6 ft 1 in (1.85 m)	180 lb (82 kg)	1985–03–09	Marshall
C	7	(Germany)	Arnold Van Opstal (R)	6 ft 9 in (2.06 m)	220 lb (100 kg)	1991–12–15	De La Salle
G	12	(Philippines)	RR Garcia	5 ft 11 in (1.80 m)	165 lb (75 kg)	1990–01–12	Far Eastern
G/F	13	(United States)	Marcio Lassiter	6 ft 2 in (1.88 m)	185 lb (84 kg)	1987–05–16	Cal State Fullerton
C	15	(Philippines)	June Mar Fajardo	6 ft 11 in (2.11 m)	268 lb (122 kg)	1989–11–17	Cebu
G/F	23	(Philippines)	Keith Agovida	6 ft 2 in (1.88 m)	170 lb (77 kg)	1990–02–14	Arellano
F	27	(Philippines)	Gabby Espinas	6 ft 4 in (1.93 m)	208 lb (94 kg)	1982–01–03	Philippine Christian
F	28	(Philippines)	Michael Mabulac	6 ft 4 in (1.93 m)	218 lb (99 kg)	1991–10–31	José Rizal
F	29	(Philippines)	Arwind Santos (C)	6 ft 4 in (1.93 m)	175 lb (79 kg)	1981–06–10	Far Eastern
F	33	(Australia)	David Semerad (injured)	6 ft 4 in (1.93 m)	220 lb (100 kg)	1991–04–25	San Beda
G/F	71	(Philippines)	Ronald Tubid	6 ft 1 in (1.85 m)	185 lb (84 kg)	1981–10–15	UE
C	95	(Philippines)	Yancy de Ocampo	6 ft 9 in (2.06 m)	245 lb (111 kg)	1980–03–11	Saint Francis of Assisi

Head coach

- (Philippines) Leo Austria

Assistant coach(es)

- (Philippines) Peter Martin (1st Assistant)
- (Philippines) Biboy Ravanes
- (Philippines) Dayong Mendoza
- (Philippines) Boyzie Zamar
- (Philippines) Renato Agustin
- (Philippines) Jorge Gallent

Team manager

- (Philippines) Gelacio Abanilla
- (Philippines) Daniel Henares (Assistant)

Legend

- (C) Team captain
- (CI) Commissioner's Cup Import
- (GI) Governors' Cup Import
- (EI) EASL Import
- (DP) Unsigned draft pick
- (FA) Free agent
- (IN) Inactive
- (S) Suspended
- (R) Rookie
- Injured

Roster

Barangay Ginebra San Miguel roster
Players
Coaches

Pos.	#	POB	Name	Height	Weight	DOB (YYYY–MM–DD)	From
G	0	(Philippines)	Paolo Taha	6 ft 0 in (1.83 m)	180 lb (82 kg)	1990–12–05	St. Benilde
G	3	(United States)	Sol Mercado	6 ft 1 in (1.85 m)	200 lb (91 kg)	1984–05–06	Biola
G	5	(Philippines)	LA Tenorio	5 ft 8 in (1.73 m)	151 lb (68 kg)	1984–07–09	Ateneo
G	6	(Philippines)	Scottie Thompson	6 ft 1 in (1.85 m)	180 lb (82 kg)	1993–07–12	UPHSD
F/C	10	(Philippines)	Dave Marcelo	6 ft 4 in (1.93 m)	223 lb (101 kg)	1989–02–22	San Beda
G	13	(Philippines)	Jayjay Helterbrand	5 ft 11 in (1.80 m)	170 lb (77 kg)	1976–10–14	Kentucky State
F	14	(Philippines)	Kevin Ferrer (R)	6 ft 4 in (1.93 m)	200 lb (91 kg)	1993–03–26	UST
C	15	(Philippines)	Jericho de Guzman (R)	6 ft 11 in (2.11 m)	245 lb (111 kg)	1989–10–19	St. Benilde
F/C	18	(Philippines)	Jammer Jamito (R)	6 ft 5 in (1.96 m)	190 lb (86 kg)	1990–09–01	St. Clare
C	20	(United States)	Greg Slaughter (injured)	7 ft 0 in (2.13 m)	258 lb (117 kg)	1988–05–19	Ateneo
F/C	25	(Philippines)	Japeth Aguilar	6 ft 9 in (2.06 m)	235 lb (107 kg)	1987–01–25	Western Kentucky
F	27	(Philippines)	Jervy Cruz	6 ft 3 in (1.91 m)	220 lb (100 kg)	1986–09–09	UST
F	31	(Philippines)	Aljon Mariano	6 ft 3 in (1.91 m)	175 lb (79 kg)	1992–08–03	UST
G/F	34	(United States)	Chris Ellis	6 ft 5 in (1.96 m)	185 lb (84 kg)	1988–12–05	Mary Hardin–Baylor
F	38	(United States)	Joe Devance	6 ft 7 in (2.01 m)	225 lb (102 kg)	1982–02–19	UTEP
G	47	(Philippines)	Mark Caguioa (C)	6 ft 1 in (1.85 m)	185 lb (84 kg)	1979–11–19	Glendale CC (CA)

Head coach

- (United States) Tim Cone

Assistant coach(es)

- (Philippines) Richard del Rosario (1st Assistant)
- (Philippines) Olsen Racela
- (Philippines) Freddie Abuda

Team manager

- (Philippines) Alfrancis Chua^{[a]}
- (Philippines) Raymond Rodriguez (Assistant)

Legend

- (C) Team captain
- (CI) Commissioner's Cup Import
- (GI) Governors' Cup Import
- (EI) EASL Import
- (DP) Unsigned draft pick
- (FA) Free agent
- (IN) Inactive
- (S) Suspended
- (R) Rookie
- Injured

Roster

- ^{a} Chua also serves as Barangay Ginebra's board governor.

== Broadcast notes ==
The Philippine Cup finals was aired on TV5 with simulcasts on PBA Rush (both in standard and high definition). TV5's radio arm, Radyo5 currently provides the radio play-by-play coverage.

Sports5 provided online livestreaming via their official YouTube account using the TV5 feed.

The PBA Rush broadcast provided English-language coverage of the finals.

Game	Sports5			PBA Rush (English)		
Game	Play-by-play	Analyst(s)	Courtside reporters	Play-by-play	Analyst(s)	Courtside reporters
Game 1	Magoo Marjon	Eric Reyes and Norman Black	Rizza Diaz	Jutt Sulit	Ali Peek	Apple David
Game 2	Sev Sarmenta	Andy Jao	Erika Padilla	Carlo Pamintuan	Vince Hizon	none
Game 3	Anthony Suntay	Quinito Henson and Ryan Gregorio	Sel Guevara	Chiqui Reyes	Jong Uichico	Chino Lui Pio
Game 4	Charlie Cuna	Dominic Uy and Ryan Gregorio	Rizza Diaz	Aaron Atayde	Don Allado	Mara Aquino
Game 5	Magoo Marjon	Andy Jao and Norman Black	Erika Padilla	James Velasquez	Charles Tiu	Carla Lizardo

- Additional Game 5 crew:
  - Trophy presentation: Aaron Atayde
  - Dugout celebration interviewer: Sel Guevara
