= David Semerad =

Filipino basketball player

Personal information
- Born: April 25, 1991 (age 35) Australia
- Listed height: 6 ft 4 in (1.93 m)
- Listed weight: 230 lb (104 kg)

Career information
- High school: John Paul College (Brisbane, Queensland)
- College: San Beda
- PBA draft: 2014: 1st round, 10th overall pick
- Drafted by: Barako Bull Energy
- Playing career: 2014–2023
- Position: Power forward / center

Career history
- 2014–2018: San Miguel Beermen
- 2019–2020: TNT KaTropa/Tropang Giga
- 2021: Blackwater Bossing
- 2023: Santa Rosa Laguna Lions

Career highlights
- 6× PBA champion (2014–15 Philippine, 2015 Governors', 2015–16 Philippine, 2016–17 Philippine, 2017 Commissioner's, 2017–18 Philippine); 4× NCAA Philippines champion (2010, 2011, 2013, 2014)

David John David Semerad (born April 25, 1991) is an Australian-born Filipino professional basketball player who last played for the Santa Rosa Laguna Lions of the Pilipinas Super League (PSL). He is also a model and TV host. His twin brother, Anthony, who was his teammate in San Beda is also a professional basketball player for the NLEX Road Warriors.

The Semerad twins were born to a Czech father and Filipina mother from Pampanga and raised in Australia. They both studied at San Beda College, taking up Business Marketing.

== College career ==
The Semerad twins were first recruited by San Beda in 2009. In their first three years with the Red Lions, the brothers were part of a team that had one Finals appearance, a historical 18–0 season, and two back-to-back championships.

In late 2011, they both left the team due to a falling out with the coaching staff, and opted to play for the Ateneo de Manila University Blue Eagles in the UAAP. Despite having to sit out two seasons before becoming eligible, the twins were actively practicing with the Blue Eagles, and participated in off-season tournaments such as the Father Martin's Summer Cup as part of Ateneo's Team B. After sitting out one season, they decided to go back to San Beda, and sent a reconciliation letter to Rev. Fr. Rector-President Aloysius Maranan for the San Beda Community. With them back in the fold, they won back-to-back titles in NCAA Seasons 89 and 90.

== Professional career ==
Semerad was picked 10th overall by Barako Bull in the 2014 PBA draft. However, he went to San Miguel Beermen after Barako Bull Energy released him immediately after a week.

On December 18, 2018, Semerad was traded, along with Brian Heruela and 2020 1st-round pick to TNT Katropa in exchange for Terrence Romeo.

== Personal life ==
Semerad has a son and a daughter with Gwen Zamora. They were married in France on February 13, 2021.

== PBA career statistics ==
Legend
GP	Games played	MPG	Minutes per game
FG%	Field-goal percentage	3P%	3-point field-goal percentage	FT%	Free-throw percentage
RPG	Rebounds per game	APG	Assists per game	SPG	Steals per game
BPG	Blocks per game	PPG	Points per game	**Bold**	Career high

As of the end of 2021 season

=== Season-by-season averages ===
Year	Team	GP	MPG	FG%	3P%	FT%	RPG	APG	SPG	BPG	PPG
2014–15	San Miguel	28	5.7	.442	—	**.842**	1.6	.1	.0	.0	**1.9**
2015–16	San Miguel	21	6.8	.333	—	.333	1.4	.1	.1	.0	.8
2016–17	San Miguel	13	5.5	.200	—	.667	1.3	.2	.1	.0	.6
2017–18	San Miguel	10	4.8	.222	—	.500	1.6	.0	.0	.1	.6
2019	TNT	**30**	5.8	**.565**	—	.429	1.5	.2	.2	.1	1.1
2020	TNT	19	9.8	.435	**.250**	.333	2.3	.4	**.4**	.2	1.2
2021	Blackwater	5	**14.4**	.250	.000	.500	**3.4**	**.8**	**.4**	**.6**	1.0
Career		126	6.8	.394	.167	.588	1.7	.2	.2	.1	1.1

== Showbiz career ==
David, with his twin brother, Anthony, are currently managed by Arnold Vegafria's ALV Talent Circuit. They have since dabbled into hosting, the most recent was with Lucy Torres in TV5's weekly dance show Celebrity Dance Battle in 2014.

Aside from being basketball players, the twins also moonlight as models, endorsing signature brands such as Bench and Sperry.

In 2011, they both entered as houseguests in ABS-CBN reality show Pinoy Big Brother: Unlimited as part of the PBB's Double Trouble twist. They entered as fake Czech Big Brother Housemates, Antonik and Imerich Novak.

== Filmography ==
=== Television ===
Year	Title	Role	Network
2011	Pinoy Big Brother: Unlimited	Houseguest	ABS-CBN
2014	Celebrity Dance Battle	Co-host	TV5
