= Keith Jensen =

Filipino-American basketball player

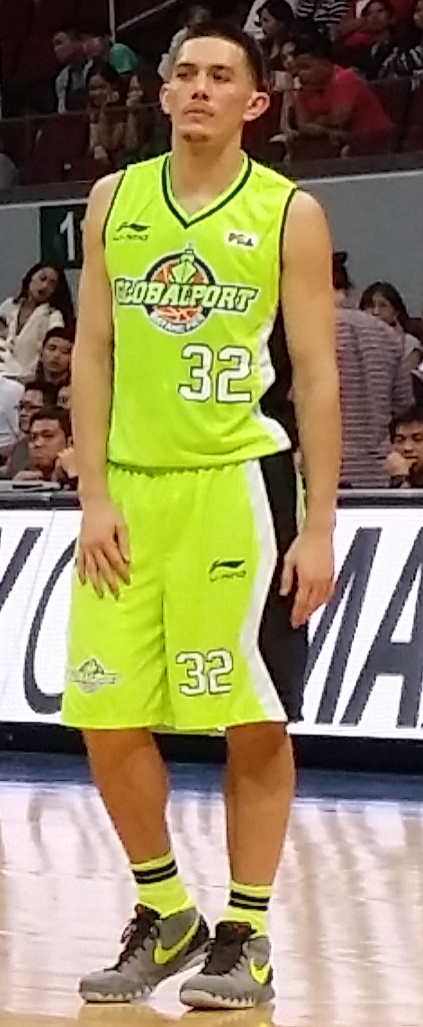

Personal information
- Born: June 7, 1988 (age 38) San Francisco, California, U.S.
- Listed height: 6 ft 4 in (1.93 m)
- Listed weight: 190 lb (86 kg)

Career information
- High school: Rancho Bernardo (San Diego, California)
- College: NYU (2006–2010)
- PBA draft: 2012: 1st round, 8th overall pick
- Drafted by: Barangay Ginebra San Miguel
- Playing career: 2012–2018
- Position: Small forward

Career history
- 2012–2013: Barangay Ginebra San Miguel
- 2013–2014: Barako Bull Energy Cola
- 2014–2016: GlobalPort Batang Pier
- 2018: CLS Knights Indonesia

Charles Keith Reyes Jensen (born June 7, 1988) is a Filipino-American former basketball player.

== Professional career ==
=== PBA ===
Jensen was selected 8th overall in the 2012 PBA draft by Barangay Ginebra San Miguel. In his Ginebra debut, he contributed 13 points on 5-of-7 from the field shooting. As losses started to pile up for Ginebra, he soon found himself losing minutes in the rotation to Rico Maierhofer, Willy Wilson, and Rudy Hatfield.

Jensen would later be traded in the season from Ginebra to Barako Bull for Josh Urbiztondo.

On June 20, 2014, Keith Jensen was traded to GlobalPort Batang Pier in exchange for RR Garcia. He scored a career-high 21 points on 8-of-13 shooting in 28 minutes in a win over the Rain or Shine Elasto Painters.

On May 11, 2016, Jensen was traded to the Star Hotshots along with Jonathan Uyloan for center Yousef Taha and for Sophomore Ronald Pascual. However, Jensen did not play a single game for the Hotshots, and on July 30, 2016, he announced that he will be leaving the team to go home to San Diego, where Jensen explains that he will address some personal matters.

=== ABL ===
On February 1, 2018, Jensen was signed by ASEAN Basketball League (ABL) club CLS Knights Indonesia, replacing Rudy Lingganay as the team's ASEAN Heritage Import. He debuted with 18 points in 25 minutes off the bench in a win over Westsports Malaysia Dragons.

== Career statistics ==
Legend
GP	Games played	MPG	Minutes per game
FG%	Field-goal percentage	3P%	3-point field-goal percentage	FT%	Free-throw percentage
RPG	Rebounds per game	APG	Assists per game	SPG	Steals per game
BPG	Blocks per game	PPG	Points per game	**Bold**	Career high

=== PBA season-by-season averages ===
Year	Team	GP	MPG	FG%	3P%	FT%	RPG	APG	SPG	BPG	PPG
2012–13	Barangay Ginebra / Barako Bull	31	12.6	.364	.242	.562	2.1	.5	.1	.1	3.1
2013–14	Barako Bull	32	16.3	**.478**	**.383**	.684	1.9	1.0	.2	.1	6.0
2014–15	GlobalPort	**34**	20.9	.410	.284	.500	**3.5**	.9	.4	.2	6.0
2015–16	GlobalPort	28	**25.0**	.353	.270	**.705**	3.4	**1.3**	**1.0**	**.6**	**6.9**
Career		125	18.6	.402	.299	.642	2.7	.9	.4	.2	5.5

=== ABL ===
Year	Team	GP	MPG	FG%	3P%	FT%	RPG	APG	SPG	BPG	PPG
2017–18	CLS	8	29.9	.430	.333	.400	3.8	1.3	1.0	.8	10.2
Career		8	29.9	.430	.333	.400	3.8	1.3	1.0	.8	10.2

== Personal life ==
Jensen was born to an American father and a Filipino mother from Guadalupe Nuevo. After retiring, he became a mental skills trainer, and set up The Mental Skills Dojo, which teaches business professionals, and athletes at every level. He is also Mental Skills Director for a basketball academy called Team Esface.
