= Tyler Wilkerson =

American basketball player (born 1988)

Personal information
- Born: July 25, 1988 (age 38) Lexington, Kentucky, U.S.
- Listed height: 6 ft 8 in (2.03 m)
- Listed weight: 240 lb (109 kg)

Career information
- High school: Lafayette (Lexington, Kentucky)
- College: Marshall (2006–2010)
- NBA draft: 2010: undrafted
- Playing career: 2010–2024
- Position: Power forward

Career history
- 2010–2011: Hapoel Gilboa Galil
- 2011–2012: Maccabi Haifa
- 2012–2013: Austin Toros
- 2013–2014: Jeonju KCC Egis
- 2014: Vaqueros de Bayamón
- 2014: Guizhou White Tigers
- 2014–2015: Jeonju KCC Egis
- 2015: Piratas de Quebradillas
- 2015: Guizhou White Tigers
- 2016: San Miguel Beermen
- 2016: Shaanxi Wolves
- 2016–2017: Al Shabab
- 2017: Gallitos de Isabela
- 2017: Caciques de Humacao
- 2017–2020: Al Sharjah
- 2021: US Monastir
- 2021: Shabab Al Ahli Club
- 2023–2024: Al-Muharraq SC
- 2024: Broncos de Caracas
- 2024: Cocodrilos de Caracas

Tyler Wilkerson (born July 25, 1988) is an American professional basketball player who last played for Cocodrilos de Caracas of the Superliga Profesional de Baloncesto. He played college basketball at Marshall University.

== Professional career ==
In 2010, he signed with Hapoel Gilboa Galil of Israel. In March 2011, he moved to Maccabi Haifa for the rest of the 2010–11 season. He later re-signed with Maccabi for the 2011–12 season.

Wilkerson joined the San Antonio Spurs for the 2012 NBA Summer League. On September 20, 2012, he signed with the Spurs. However, he was waived on October 11. In November 2012, he was acquired by the Austin Toros.

On August 29, 2013, Wilkerson's rights were acquired by the Delaware 87ers in the 2013 NBA Development League Expansion Draft. He later joined Jeonju KCC Egis of South Korea for the 2013–14 season.

In 2014, he signed with the Guizhou White Tigers of the NBL.

On January 24, 2015, he signed with Piratas de Quebradillas of the Baloncesto Superior Nacional (BSN).

In February 2016, Wilkerson joined the San Miguel Beermen (PBA) to play as an import for the 2016 Commissioner's Cup Conference that started the same month.

In June 2016, Wilkerson signed in China with the Shaanxi Wolves for the 2016 NBL season.
