= Ronald Pascual =

Filipino basketball player

Personal information
- Born: June 23, 1988 (age 38) Mexico, Pampanga, Philippines
- Listed height: 6 ft 3 in (1.91 m)
- Listed weight: 190 lb (86 kg)

Career information
- High school: Adamson (Manila)
- College: San Sebastian
- PBA draft: 2014: 1st round, 3rd overall pick
- Drafted by: Barako Bull Energy
- Playing career: 2014–2018, 2021
- Position: Small forward / shooting guard

Career history
- 2014–2015: San Miguel Beermen
- 2015–2016: Star Hotshots
- 2016: GlobalPort Batang Pier
- 2016: Blackwater Elite
- 2017–2018: Alaska Aces
- 2021: Pampanga Delta

Career highlights
- 2× PBA champion (2015 Philippine, 2015 Governors'); PBA D-League champion (2011 Foundation)

Ronald Lozada Pascual (born June 23, 1988) is a Filipino former professional basketball player. He was drafted third overall by the Barako Bull Energy in the 2014 PBA draft.

== Early life ==
Pascual started playing basketball at age 11, but he was a varsity volleyball player until he was in his second year of high school. It was this experience that taught him the proper way to use his legs when jumping.

He was discovered by former NU Women's basketball coach Benjie Navarro, who brought him to Adamson University.

== College career ==
After spending one year as an aspirant, head coach Jimwell Gican, elevated him to the UAAP juniors team entering his final year in high school. Unfortunately for him, he tore the anterior cruciate ligament on his right knee during summer practice, thus forcing him to sit out an entire year.

He spent a year in Adamson's Team B during his first year in college and recalls that experience as one of the hardest times in his life. Because of this, he returned to the comforts of home in an effort to rediscover his confidence by playing in inter-barangay leagues. Back in Pampanga, he received a call from none other than the lead assistant coach of San Sebastian, Alan Trinidad who asked him to participate in the basketball camp of then Mayor Dennis Pineda in Lubao, Pampanga. Pineda then took him in his stable, along with Calvin Abueva and Ian Sangalang, and together, they formed an alliance in San Sebastian called "Pinatubo Trio". They won their only NCAA championship together in 2009 under head coach and fellow Kapampangan, Ato Agustin. Two years later, the same triumvirate won the first PBA D-League Championship in 2011.

== Professional career ==
Pascual was supposed to apply for the 2012 PBA draft, but he pulled out at the last minute due to nagging injuries. Instead, he decided to play for the NLEX Road Warriors in the D-League where he was one of the members of this star-studded team that dominated the D-League and went to the finals for 7 straight conferences in four seasons, winning 6 of them. Finally, he decided to join the 2014 PBA draft in a last-minute decision upon the advice of his longtime patron Dennis Pineda.

He was eventually drafted by San Miguel as no. 3 overall, in a team fully loaded with swingmen in its rotation.

On September 28, 2015, Pascual, together with Jake Pascual, was among the six players who was traded in a four-team deal that sent them to the Star Hotshots. In early 2016, Pascual did not report to the team's practices for a month and has not been seen since December 2015. However, just one day after an article was published in Spin.ph about his missing, it was reported that he came back to the Hotshots' practice, with Star team governor Rene Pardo citing that Pascual had a recurring fever and was unable to communicate with the team officials after his two cell phones were stolen in his car.

== PBA career statistics ==
Legend
GP	Games played	MPG	Minutes per game
FG%	Field-goal percentage	3P%	3-point field-goal percentage	FT%	Free-throw percentage
RPG	Rebounds per game	APG	Assists per game	SPG	Steals per game
BPG	Blocks per game	PPG	Points per game	**Bold**	Career high

Correct as of January 21, 2026

=== Season-by-season averages ===
Year	Team	GP	MPG	FG%	3P%	FT%	RPG	APG	SPG	BPG	PPG
2014–15	San Miguel	**23**	**12.1**	.394	.340	.250	**2.0**	.6	.2	.2	3.2
2015–16	Star	11	7.2	.333	.400	**.800**	1.6	.4	**.4**	.0	2.0
2015–16	GlobalPort	2	2.0	.000	.000	.000	1.0	.0	.0	.0	.0
2016–17	Blackwater	1	4.1	.000	.000	.000	.0	.0	.0	.0	.0
2017–18	Alaska Aces	12	10.5	**.444**	**.433**	.750	1.7	**.8**	.2	**.3**	**4.0**
Career		49	10.8	.366	.356	.667	2.1	.6	.3	.1	3.4
