= UAAP Season 73 men's basketball tournament =

Basketball competition in the Philippines

UAAP Season 73
- Host school: De La Salle University
Men's Finals	G1	G2	Wins
FEU Tamaraws	49	62	0
Ateneo Blue Eagles	72	65	2
- Duration: September 25–30, 2010
- Arena(s): Araneta Coliseum
- Finals MVP: Ryan Buenafe
- Winning coach: Norman Black (3rd title)
- Semifinalists: Adamson Soaring Falcons; De La Salle Green Archers
- TV network(s): ABS-CBN, Studio 23, The Filipino Channel, Balls HD

The UAAP Season 73 men's basketball tournament is the University Athletic Association of the Philippines (UAAP)'s men's basketball tournament for the 2010–11 season.

The Ateneo Blue Eagles won against the FEU Tamaraws in the finals, winning in two games. Ateneo blew out FEU in the first game, and hanged on in the second game to clinch their third consecutive title. Ryan Buenafe, who scored a crucial three-point shot late in Game 2, was named Finals MVP. In the semifinals, FEU defeated the De La Salle Green Archers in overtime on their semifinal match-up, while Ateneo blew out the Adamson Falcons in the other semifinal.

The UP Fighting Maroons finished the season with no victories for the second time in four years; their coach Aboy Castro went on leave after incurring their second consecutive loss, and new coach Boyet Fernandez led the team to twelve more defeats to end the season with a 0–14 record. Fernandez tendered his courtesy resignation to university officials after the last game of the season

Sophomore Ryan Roose "RR" Garcia and freshman Terrence Romeo, both from FEU, were named most valuable player and rookie of the year, respectively.

== Teams ==
Team	School	Coach
Adamson Soaring Falcons	Adamson University	Leo Austria
Ateneo Blue Eagles	Ateneo de Manila University	Norman Black
De La Salle Green Archers	De La Salle University	Dindo Pumaren
FEU Tamaraws	Far Eastern University	Glenn Capacio
NU Bulldogs	National University	Eric Gonzales
UE Red Warriors	University of the East	Lawrence Chongson
UP Fighting Maroons	University of the Philippines Diliman	Boyet Fernandez
UST Growling Tigers	University of Santo Tomas	Pido Jarencio

=== Coaching changes ===
Coaching changes
Team	Old coach	Reason	New coach	Old position
Preseason
La Salle	Franz Pumaren	Resigned	Dindo Pumaren	La Salle assistant coach
NU	Manny Dandan	Fired	Eric Gonzales	NU assistant coach
During the season
UP	Aboy Castro	Filed indefinite leave of absence	Boyet Fernandez	UP consultant

== Preseason ==
Two teams entered the season with new coaches.

After missing the semifinals for the first time, Franz Pumaren resigned as head coach of the De La Salle Green Archers, after which he announced his intention to run for Congressman of Quezon City's 3rd district. His brother, assistant coach Dindo Pumaren and former head coach of the UE Red Warriors is his replacement.

The NU Bulldogs terminated head coach Manny Dandan's contract after leading the team to a 3–11 finish the previous year. Meanwhile, the Manila Bulletin reported that UST Growling Tigers head coach Pido Jarencio was fired, although the university later issued a statement that he is remaining as head coach until at least January 2011. NU was reportedly wooing Jarencio to be their head coach, although NU clarified that it was only a rumor. NU ultimately decided to promote assistant coach Eric Gonzales as the new head coach, with advice from new consultant Eric Altamirano.

In preseason warmup tournaments, the FEU Tamaraws was defeated by NCAA champion San Sebastian Stags 79–78 in the Filoil Flying V First Five Preseason Invitational Cup final, while the Ateneo Blue Eagles defeated the Mapua Cardinals in the Father Martin's Cup final, 68–64.

Prior to the season, FEU and defending champion Ateneo were ranked the teams to beat; UE were targeting for a championship, and La Salle was low-key as Pumaren touted his roster as the "youngest in the season." Jarencio remained modest as UST was ranked eighth (last). Adamson and NU aimed to be recognized as "contenders." UP coach Aboy Castro commented that while general consensus dictates that Ateneo and FEU were locked in the top two spots, "it will be tough to get into the 3rd and 4th slot." Furthermore, Finals will be aired in ABS-CBN Channel 2.

== Elimination round ==
Most games were held at the Araneta Coliseum in Quezon City and the PhilSports Arena in Pasig, with a single gameday played at Filoil Flying V Arena in San Juan.

=== Team standings ===
Pos	Team	W	L	PCT	GB	Qualification
1	FEU Tamaraws	12	2	.857	—	Twice-to-beat in the semifinals
2	Ateneo Blue Eagles	10	4	.714	2	Twice-to-beat in the semifinals
3	Adamson Soaring Falcons	9	5	.643	3	Twice-to-win in the semifinals
4	De La Salle Green Archers (H)	8	6	.571	4	Twice-to-win in the semifinals
5	NU Bulldogs	7	7	.500	5	
6	UE Red Warriors	6	8	.429	6	
7	UST Growling Tigers	4	10	.286	8	
8	UP Fighting Maroons	0	14	.000	12	

Source: ABS-CBN Sports
Rules for classification: 1) winning percentage; 2) if tied for #2 or #4, one-game playoff; 3) head-to-head record; 4) head-to-head point differential; 5) overall point differential
(H) Hosts

=== Match-up results ===
	Round 1							Round 2						
Team ╲ Game	1	2	3	4	5	6	7	8	9	10	11	12	13	14
Adamson	NU school colors	Ateneo school colors	UP school colors	UST school colors	FEU school colors	UE school colors	La Salle school colors	FEU school colors	UST school colors	UE school colors	UP school colors	Ateneo school colors	NU school colors	La Salle school colors
Ateneo	FEU school colors	Adamson school colors	UST school colors	La Salle school colors	NU school colors	UP school colors	UE school colors	UP school colors	NU school colors	La Salle school colors	UE school colors	Adamson school colors	UST school colors	FEU school colors
La Salle	UP school colors	NU school colors	UE school colors	Ateneo school colors	FEU school colors	UST school colors	Adamson school colors	NU school colors	UP school colors	Ateneo school colors	FEU school colors	UST school colors	UE school colors	Adamson school colors
FEU	Ateneo school colors	NU school colors	UE school colors	UP school colors	La Salle school colors	Adamson school colors	UST school colors	Adamson school colors	UE school colors	UST school colors	La Salle school colors	NU school colors	UP school colors	Ateneo school colors
NU	Adamson school colors	La Salle school colors	FEU school colors	UE school colors	UST school colors	Ateneo school colors	UP school colors	La Salle school colors	Ateneo school colors	UP school colors	UE school colors	FEU school colors	Adamson school colors	UST school colors
UE	UST school colors	La Salle school colors	FEU school colors	NU school colors	UP school colors	Adamson school colors	Ateneo school colors	UST school colors	FEU school colors	Adamson school colors	Ateneo school colors	NU school colors	La Salle school colors	UP school colors
UP	La Salle school colors	Adamson school colors	UST school colors	FEU school colors	UE school colors	Ateneo school colors	NU school colors	Ateneo school colors	La Salle school colors	NU school colors	Adamson school colors	UST school colors	FEU school colors	UE school colors
UST	UE school colors	Ateneo school colors	UP school colors	Adamson school colors	NU school colors	La Salle school colors	FEU school colors	UE school colors	Adamson school colors	FEU school colors	UP school colors	La Salle school colors	Ateneo school colors	NU school colors

= Win; = OT win; = Loss; = OT loss

=== Results ===
Team	AdU	ADMU	DLSU	FEU	NU	UE	UP	UST
Adamson Soaring Falcons		66–69	70–68	65–74	60–54	69–56	66–59	75–71
Ateneo Blue Eagles	55–52		63–66	69–72	82–65	80–73	78–53	68–56
De La Salle Green Archers	64–69	57–74		80–84**	55–59	82–63	80–62	61–53
FEU Tamaraws	63–64	74–72	66–80		76–72	91–81	94–70	65–57
NU Bulldogs	62–59	49–69	56–59	62–77		70–63	70–66	58–59
UE Red Warriors	71–63	62–60	80–74	77–83*	68–69		59–54	67–80
UP Fighting Maroons	51–74	59–75	63–84	48–70	59–61	61–67		81–87*
UST Growling Tigers	76–81**	77–81	69–78	76–67	54–62	65–75	68–66	

Legend: Blue = left column team win; Red = top row team win.
Matches with lighter background shading were decided after overtime.

=== First round ===
After the opening ceremonies hosted by La Salle, their varsity team blew out UP in the opening game, reminiscent of the opening game blow out during the 2007 tournament where State U finished with a 0–14 record. In the second game, UST won over UE, on what was said to be an upset win over last year's runners-up. Adamson won over NU the next day, and what was rated to be an early match-up of the top two teams, FEU won over Ateneo in a tight contest. FEU won their next six games, sweeping the elimination round; Ateneo on the other hand, after winning another tight game against Adamson, finished second after the first round; their own other loss coming from their arch rivals La Salle, in which the Green Archers capitalized on Kirk Long going to the bench in the final minutes after fouling out. The referees of the Adamson-Ateneo game were later suspended for errant calls that cost Adamson the game.

Adamson came back after their loss against Ateneo and won two straight against UP and UST. After the loss to Adamson, UP head coach Aboy Castro filed for an indefinite leave of absence from the squad; team consultant Boyet Fernandez was then appointed as interim head coach. On UP's next game, UST was saved by Jeric Fortuna's three-point shots to force overtime and defeat UP.

UE was unable to secure wins against FEU and NU, while the Bulldogs also suffered a loss against the Tamaraws, before winning against UE. They were beaten anew by UST in another close game, while the Tigers themselves lost to the Green Archers and Tamaraws to cap off their first round with a 3–4 record. UP was still unable to win against UE (which won their first game of the season against them) and Ateneo.

La Salle ended their first round with two-point loss against Adamson, which made the Falcons within striking distance from FEU and Ateneo in the standings. Ateneo finished the first round with a triumph against last year's Finals nemesis UE in a close game until the Eagles pulled away late in the fourth quarter.

=== Second round ===
The Tigers opened the second round with another loss, this time against UE; this led to the two teams being tied with 3–5 records. In the next game, Adamson cut FEU's 7-game winning streak with a one-point loss against Adamson. This assured that there will be no "stepladder" format during the playoffs. Ateneo extended their three-game winning streak to four games after a blowout win against the Fighting Maroons; UP then had a record of 0–8.

La Salle split their season series against NU with a win to move past the .500 barrier. FEU was brought to another close game, this time against UE, but the Tamaraws were able to defeat the Red Warriors via overtime to notch their first second round win. Off from their win against FEU, Adamson needed two overtime periods to win over UST. The loss effectively close the door for a semifinal appearance for the Tigers.

La Salle and Ateneo had similar wins against UP and NU, respectively, with La Salle winning by 21 points while Ateneo won by twenty.

Off from their win against FEU, and a double-overtime win against UST, Adamson was upset by UE, which by then had two wins in nine games. FEU won over UST, which then had lost five consecutive games, to remain first and clinch the first semifinal berth. Adamson then won against UP, their 11th consecutive loss. The Red Warriors, which had to win all of their remaining games to have shot at the Final Four, shocked Ateneo in what could be a start of an improbable playoff run.

NU won over UP by two points after a controversial non-call by the referees. Fighting Maroon Mark Juruena had earlier been called for five consecutive lane violations with UP trailing by two points with 1.2 seconds left; UP coach Boyet Fernandez instructed Juruena to deliberately cross the lane while NU's Jewel Ponferrada was attempting his free-throw hoping to tempt NU to do the same act and force a double lane violation (subsequently a jump ball at center court, the possession arrow rule is suspended during the last two minutes of a game); the referees did not call the violation and UP coach Fernandez rushed to commissioner Badolato afterward to plead his case. In their rivalry game against Ateneo, La Salle came up short as Ateneo won, 74–57.

UST extended UP's woes with another close game, and ended their own five-game losing streak. Off from a loss against Ateneo, La Salle had an upset win against FEU. In what was an elimination game for UE if they lose, UE had their two-game winning run snapped by NU, which then eliminated the Red Warriors from contention.

With their last 25 games against Ateneo all losing efforts, Adamson had to win against the Eagles in order to have a realistic chance for a twice-to-beat advantage; however, Ateneo held on to the win, but not after Jumbo Escueta was ejected when a patch fell off his shorts, rendering his uniform dissimilar to his teammates. With the win, Ateneo clinched a semifinals berth.

FEU won against NU, while La Salle outlasted UST to remain in the top two teams in the standings. In a last-ditch attempt to secure at least a playoff for a twice-to-beat advantage, La Salle was beaten by also-ran UE; Adamson also suffered the same fate, losing to NU to clinch FEU and Ateneo the twice-to-win advantages. FEU then won against UP, their thirteenth loss in the season, and Ateneo won over UST to set up a virtual game for the #1 seed.

UST ended the season with another loss, this time against NU. This placed NU on the .500 mark, and gave UST coach Pido Jarencio his worst finish as a UAAP head coach. In a virtual playoff for the #3 seed, Adamson won by five points to relegate La Salle to the #4 seed. UE ended the season in a two-game winning streak, beating UP. UP finished the season winless, and had their 18th consecutive loss, including games from the previous season. FEU won over Ateneo after Terrence Romeo and RR Garcia scored on a deciding 8–0 run to lead FEU to victory.

== Bracket ==
Semifinals (Top 2 twice-to-beat)
1	FEU	69*
4	La Salle	59
2	Ateneo	68
3	Adamson	55

Finals (Best-of-three playoff)
1	FEU	49	62
2	Ateneo	72	65

*Overtime

== Semifinals ==
FEU and Ateneo have the twice-to-beat advantage. They only have to win once, while their opponents, twice, to progress.

=== FEU vs. La Salle ===
Studio 23

September 16
4:00 p.m.

FEU Tamaraws	69–59 (OT)	De La Salle Green Archers
Scoring by quarter: 20–12, 6–20, 14–12, 15–11, Overtime: 14–4
Pts: Romeo, Sanga 12 each Rebs: Reil Cervantes 19; Asts: Aldrech Ramos 3		Pts: Joshua Webb 15; Rebs: Maui Villanueva 13; Asts: Simon Atkins 4
FEU wins series in one game

Araneta Coliseum, Quezon City

=== Ateneo vs. Adamson ===
Studio 23

September 19
4:00 p.m.

Ateneo Blue Eagles	68–55	Adamson Soaring Falcons
Scoring by quarter: 22–12, 17–17, 21–13, 8–13
Pts: Emman Monfort 22; Rebs: Ryan Buenafe 9 Asts: Eric Salamat 5		Pts: Lester Alvarez 11; Rebs: Lionel Manyara 8 Asts: Alvarez, Canada 2 each
Ateneo wins series in one game

Araneta Coliseum, Quezon City

== Finals ==
ABS-CBN

September 25
4:30 p.m.

FEU Tamaraws	49–72	Ateneo Blue Eagles
Scoring by quarter: 8–26, 13–16, 17–18, 11–12
Pts: RR Garcia 11; Rebs: Aldrech Ramos 11; Asts: RR Garcia 3		Pts: Kirk Long 14; Rebs: Nico Salva 9 Asts: Eric Salamat 6

Araneta Coliseum, Quezon City
Attendance: 16,834

Studio 23

September 30
3:30 p.m.

FEU Tamaraws	62–65	Ateneo Blue Eagles
Scoring by quarter: 22–13, 9–17, 19–22, 12–13
Pts: Reil Cervantes 15; Rebs: Reil Cervantes 10; Asts: RR Garcia 6		Pts: Ryan Buenafe 23; Rebs: 3 players, 6 each Asts: Monfort, Salamat 3 each
Ateneo wins series 2–0

Araneta Coliseum, Quezon City
Attendance: 17,215

- Finals Most Valuable Player: Ryan Buenafe (Ateneo Blue Eagles)

== Controversies ==
Commissioner Ato Badolato suspended the three referees who officiated the Ateneo–Adamson first round game for two games on unspecified "bad calls." Ateneo won that game 69–66.

Badolato also suspended three players for a single game each for incurring their second unsportsmanlike fouls in the season:

- Reil Cervantes of FEU for clotheslining Paul Lee of UE
- Alvin Padilla of UP for elbowing Ateneo's Arthur dela Cruz.
- Glenn Khobuntin of NU for tripping La Salle's Sam Marata.

Badolato further suspended two referees of the NU–UP second round game, and Alvin Padilla of UP for hurling invectives at the officials. Padilla received a one-game suspension, while the referees received suspensions for two play-dates for poor performance; referee Glenn Cornelio was previously suspended as being part of the officiating crew of the Ateneo–Adamson second round game. UP placed the result of the game under protest for the referees' judgment call on UP's lane violation and on a non-call on NU's Emmanuel Mbe's supposedly goal-tending of UP's Alvin Padlla's three-point shot.

== Awards ==
The UAAP awarded the outstanding players of the season prior to Game 2 of the Finals at the Araneta Coliseum.

- Most Valuable Player: RR Garcia (FEU Tamaraws)
- Rookie of the Year: Terrence Romeo (FEU Tamaraws)
- Mythical Five:
  - RR Garcia (FEU Tamaraws)
  - Emmanuel Mbe (NU Bulldogs)
  - Aldrech Ramos (FEU Tamaraws)
  - Paul Lee (UE Red Warriors)
  - Kenneth Acibar (UE Red Warriors)

== Broadcast notes ==
Studio 23 carried all games live, except for the 1st game of the finals where it was aired live by ABS-CBN in its terrestrial television channel for the first time. ABS-CBN would have aired the third game but the Ateneo Blue Eagles already won the finals series during the second game. SkyCable Channel 166 (Balls HD) aired the finals series on high definition live, with Balls SD airing the replays. The Filipino Channel broadcast the series outside the Philippines.

Game	Play-by-play	Analyst	Courtside reporters	TV ratings	
Game	Play-by-play	Analyst	Courtside reporters	AGB Mega Manila	Kantar Media-TNS National
FEU–La Salle men's semifinal	Eric Tipan	Marco Benitez	Stephanie Sy and Erin Torrejon	NA	NA
Ateneo–Adamson men's semifinal	Boom Gonzalez	TJ Manotoc	Jessica Mendoza and Job de Leon	NA	NA
Finals, Game 1	Eric Tipan	TJ Manotoc	Jessica Mendoza and Stephanie Sy	3.5%, 7th	9.7%, 7th
Finals, Game 2	Boom Gonzalez	TJ Manotoc	Jessica Mendoza and Stephanie Sy	NA	NA

Preceded by Season 72 (2009)	UAAP basketball seasons Season 73 (2010) basketball	Succeeded by Season 74 (2011)
