= UAAP Season 73 basketball tournaments =

Basketball competition in the Philippines

UAAP Season 73
- Host school: De La Salle University
Men's Finals	G1	G2	Wins
FEU Tamaraws	49	62	0
Ateneo Blue Eagles	72	65	2
- Duration: September 25–30, 2010
- Arena(s): Araneta Coliseum
- Finals MVP: Ryan Buenafe
- Winning coach: Norman Black (3rd title)
- Semifinalists: Adamson Soaring Falcons; De La Salle Green Archers
- TV network(s): ABS-CBN, Studio 23, The Filipino Channel, Balls HD
Women's Finals	G1	G2	Wins
FEU Lady Tamaraws	69	54	0
Adamson Lady Falcons	75	56	2
- Duration: September 25–30, 2010
- Arena(s): Araneta Coliseum
- Finals MVP: Analyn Almazan
- Winning coach: Emily Vega
- Semifinalists: De La Salle Lady Archers; UST Tigresses
Juniors' Finals	G1	G2	G3	Wins
Ateneo Blue Eaglets	71	76	76	2+1
UST Tiger Cubs	77	66	59	1
- Duration: September 14–19, 2010
- Arena(s): Filoil Flying V Arena (Game 1); Araneta Coliseum (Games 2 & 3)
- Finals MVP: Kiefer Ravena
- Winning coach: Jamike Jarin (8th title)
- Semifinalists: NUNS Bullpups; Zobel Junior Archers
- TV network(s): Studio 23, The Filipino Channel, Balls HD

The University Athletic Association of the Philippines Season 73 basketball tournaments are the basketball events of UAAP's 2010–11 season. The basketball season began on July 10, 2010 at the Araneta Coliseum in Quezon City with an opening ceremony hosted by De La Salle University, followed by a couple of men's basketball games. Hosts De La Salle Green Archers defeated the UP Fighting Maroons, and the UST Growling Tigers defeated the UE Red Warriors in the last game of the day.

Ato Badolato, former head coach of the San Beda Red Cubs, was named commissioner for basketball for the 2010 season.

== Results ==
=== Juniors ===
The Juniors were the first of the three basketball tournaments to be finished. The Ateneo Blue Eaglets forced the step ladder format, putting themselves directly into the finals. Four other teams battled it out for the one spot left in the finals, with UST triumphing after beating out La Salle, 74–60. Since Ateneo cleared the eliminations, they were given an automatic 1–0 lead in the finals series. However, UST tied it up with a 77–71 win. Ateneo then continued on to sweep the next two games, 76–66 in game 2, and 76–59 in game 3. This was the Juniors' 17th title, and 3rd consecutive championship.

=== Women ===
Second-seed Adamson Lady Falcons has advanced to the finals with a win over the UST Lady Tigresses, 72–59. However, fourth-seed La Salle Lady Archers edged out first-seed FEU Lady Tamaraws to extend the series, where the winner will advance and face Adamson. FEU won the knockout match to set up a finals showdown with Adamson.

=== Men ===
First-seed FEU Tamaraws advanced to the finals after beating the De La Salle Green Archers in overtime, 69–59. They faced off against the defending champion Ateneo Blue Eagles, who blew past the Adamson Falcons, 68–55. Ateneo started off with an outstanding win, sweeping the Tamaraws by 23 points in game one (72–49), which was the lowest output by a team in the finals since UAAP Season 61, by the same school. The Tamaraws looked ahead for a comeback, being only down by one point, 56–57, in the last 3 minutes of the 4th quarter. However. the Blue Eagles managed to distance, with 2 successive baskets, and a good free throw. FEU scored 3 successful free throws to go up 59–61 against the Ateneans, at the final minute of the championship. However, with a critical hold by Ateneo, Ryan Buenafe pulled off a three-point shot to give Ateneo a 64–59 lead while heading into the final 20 seconds of the game. FEU managed to score just one more three-pointer, but still went down, 62–65. The Ateneo Blue Eagles became the fifth successful team to achieve 3 consecutive championships, and capture their 6th championship title.

=== Finals MVP ===
In Game 2, Ryan Buenafe delivered a season high of 23 points, and a critical three-point shot that lead to the championship. He was named Finals MVP.

== Men's tournament ==
=== Teams ===
Team	University	Coach
Adamson Soaring Falcons	Adamson University (AdU)	(Philippines) Leo Austria
Ateneo Blue Eagles	Ateneo de Manila University (ADMU)	(United States) Norman Black
De La Salle Green Archers	De La Salle University (DLSU)	(Philippines) Dindo Pumaren
FEU Tamaraws	Far Eastern University (FEU)	(Philippines) Glenn Capacio
NU Bulldogs	National University (NU)	(Philippines) Eric Gonzales
UE Red Warriors	University of the East (UE)	(Philippines) Lawrence Chongson
UP Fighting Maroons	University of the Philippines Diliman (UP)	(Philippines) Boyet Fernandez
UST Growling Tigers	University of Santo Tomas (UST)	(Philippines) Pido Jarencio

=== Elimination round ===
Most games were held at the Araneta Coliseum in Quezon City and the PhilSports Arena in Pasig, with a single gameday played at Filoil Flying V Arena in San Juan.

==== Team standings ====
Pos	Team	W	L	PCT	GB	Qualification
1	FEU Tamaraws	12	2	.857	—	Twice-to-beat in the semifinals
2	Ateneo Blue Eagles	10	4	.714	2	Twice-to-beat in the semifinals
3	Adamson Soaring Falcons	9	5	.643	3	Twice-to-win in the semifinals
4	De La Salle Green Archers (H)	8	6	.571	4	Twice-to-win in the semifinals
5	NU Bulldogs	7	7	.500	5	
6	UE Red Warriors	6	8	.429	6	
7	UST Growling Tigers	4	10	.286	8	
8	UP Fighting Maroons	0	14	.000	12	

Source: ABS-CBN Sports
Rules for classification: 1) winning percentage; 2) if tied for #2 or #4, one-game playoff; 3) head-to-head record; 4) head-to-head point differential; 5) overall point differential
(H) Hosts

==== Match-up results ====
	Round 1							Round 2						
Team ╲ Game	1	2	3	4	5	6	7	8	9	10	11	12	13	14
Adamson	NU school colors	Ateneo school colors	UP school colors	UST school colors	FEU school colors	UE school colors	La Salle school colors	FEU school colors	UST school colors	UE school colors	UP school colors	Ateneo school colors	NU school colors	La Salle school colors
Ateneo	FEU school colors	Adamson school colors	UST school colors	La Salle school colors	NU school colors	UP school colors	UE school colors	UP school colors	NU school colors	La Salle school colors	UE school colors	Adamson school colors	UST school colors	FEU school colors
La Salle	UP school colors	NU school colors	UE school colors	Ateneo school colors	FEU school colors	UST school colors	Adamson school colors	NU school colors	UP school colors	Ateneo school colors	FEU school colors	UST school colors	UE school colors	Adamson school colors
FEU	Ateneo school colors	NU school colors	UE school colors	UP school colors	La Salle school colors	Adamson school colors	UST school colors	Adamson school colors	UE school colors	UST school colors	La Salle school colors	NU school colors	UP school colors	Ateneo school colors
NU	Adamson school colors	La Salle school colors	FEU school colors	UE school colors	UST school colors	Ateneo school colors	UP school colors	La Salle school colors	Ateneo school colors	UP school colors	UE school colors	FEU school colors	Adamson school colors	UST school colors
UE	UST school colors	La Salle school colors	FEU school colors	NU school colors	UP school colors	Adamson school colors	Ateneo school colors	UST school colors	FEU school colors	Adamson school colors	Ateneo school colors	NU school colors	La Salle school colors	UP school colors
UP	La Salle school colors	Adamson school colors	UST school colors	FEU school colors	UE school colors	Ateneo school colors	NU school colors	Ateneo school colors	La Salle school colors	NU school colors	Adamson school colors	UST school colors	FEU school colors	UE school colors
UST	UE school colors	Ateneo school colors	UP school colors	Adamson school colors	NU school colors	La Salle school colors	FEU school colors	UE school colors	Adamson school colors	FEU school colors	UP school colors	La Salle school colors	Ateneo school colors	NU school colors

= Win; = OT win; = Loss; = OT loss

=== Bracket ===
Semifinals (Top 2 twice-to-beat)
1	FEU	69*
4	La Salle	59
2	Ateneo	68
3	Adamson	55

Finals (Best-of-three playoff)
1	FEU	49	62
2	Ateneo	72	65

*Overtime

=== Semifinals ===
==== (1) FEU vs. (4) La Salle ====
Studio 23

September 16

FEU Tamaraws	69–59 (OT)	De La Salle Green Archers
FEU wins series in one game

Araneta Coliseum, Quezon City

==== (2) Ateneo vs. (3) Adamson ====
Studio 23

September 19

Ateneo Blue Eagles	68–55	Adamson Soaring Falcons
Ateneo wins series in one game

Araneta Coliseum, Quezon City

=== Finals ===
ABS-CBN

September 25

FEU Tamaraws	49–72	Ateneo Blue Eagles

Araneta Coliseum, Quezon City

Studio 23

September 30

FEU Tamaraws	62–65	Ateneo Blue Eagles
Ateneo wins series 2–0

Araneta Coliseum, Quezon City

- Finals Most Valuable Player: Ryan Buenafe (Ateneo Blue Eagles)

=== Awards ===
UAAP Season 73 men's basketball champions
Ateneo Blue Eagles
Sixth title, third consecutive title

- Most Valuable Player: RR Garcia (FEU Tamaraws)
- Rookie of the Year: Terrence Romeo (FEU Tamaraws)

== Women's tournament ==
=== Elimination round ===
==== Team standings ====
Pos	Team	W	L	PCT	GB	Qualification
1	FEU Lady Tamaraws	13	1	.929	—	Twice-to-beat in the semifinals
2	Adamson Lady Falcons	13	1	.929	—	Twice-to-beat in the semifinals
3	UST Tigresses	9	5	.643	4	Twice-to-win in the semifinals
4	De La Salle Lady Archers	9	5	.643	4	Twice-to-win in the semifinals
5	NU Lady Bulldogs (H)	4	10	.286	9	
6	UP Lady Maroons	4	10	.286	9	
7	Ateneo Lady Eagles	4	10	.286	9	
8	UE Lady Warriors	0	14	.000	13	

Source: ABS-CBN Sports
Rules for classification: 1) winning percentage; 2) if tied for #2 or #4, one-game playoff; 3) head-to-head record; 4) head-to-head point differential; 5) overall point differential
(H) Hosts

==== Match-up results ====
	Round 1							Round 2						
Team ╲ Game	1	2	3	4	5	6	7	8	9	10	11	12	13	14
Adamson	La Salle school colors	UP school colors	UST school colors	Ateneo school colors	NU school colors	UE school colors	FEU school colors	La Salle school colors	Ateneo school colors	NU school colors	UE school colors	UST school colors	UP school colors	FEU school colors
Ateneo	UE school colors	FEU school colors	NU school colors	Adamson school colors	UST school colors	La Salle school colors	UP school colors	UP school colors	Adamson school colors	UST school colors	FEU school colors	UE school colors	La Salle school colors	NU school colors
La Salle	Adamson school colors	NU school colors	FEU school colors	UE school colors	UP school colors	Ateneo school colors	UST school colors	Adamson school colors	UP school colors	UE school colors	NU school colors	FEU school colors	Ateneo school colors	UST school colors
FEU	UST school colors	Ateneo school colors	La Salle school colors	NU school colors	UE school colors	UP school colors	Adamson school colors	UST school colors	NU school colors	UP school colors	Ateneo school colors	La Salle school colors	UE school colors	Adamson school colors
NU	UP school colors	La Salle school colors	Ateneo school colors	FEU school colors	Adamson school colors	UST school colors	UE school colors	UE school colors	FEU school colors	Adamson school colors	La Salle school colors	UP school colors	UST school colors	Ateneo school colors
UE	Ateneo school colors	UST school colors	UP school colors	La Salle school colors	FEU school colors	Adamson school colors	NU school colors	NU school colors	UST school colors	La Salle school colors	Adamson school colors	Ateneo school colors	FEU school colors	UP school colors
UP	NU school colors	Adamson school colors	UE school colors	UST school colors	La Salle school colors	FEU school colors	Ateneo school colors	Ateneo school colors	La Salle school colors	FEU school colors	UST school colors	NU school colors	Adamson school colors	UE school colors
UST	FEU school colors	UE school colors	Adamson school colors	UP school colors	Ateneo school colors	NU school colors	La Salle school colors	FEU school colors	UE school colors	Ateneo school colors	UP school colors	Adamson school colors	NU school colors	La Salle school colors

= Win; = OT win; = Loss; = OT loss

=== Bracket ===
Semifinals (Top 2 twice-to-beat)
1	FEU	61	65
4	La Salle	64	35
2	Adamson	72
3	UST	59

Finals (Best-of-three playoff)
1	FEU	69	54
2	Adamson	75	56

=== Semifinals ===
==== (1) FEU vs. (4) La Salle ====
September 18

FEU Lady Tamaraws	61–64	De La Salle Lady Archers

Filoil Flying V Arena, San Juan

September 21

FEU Lady Tamaraws	65–35	De La Salle Lady Archers
FEU wins series in two games

Filoil Flying V Arena, San Juan

==== (2) Adamson vs. (3) UST ====
September 18

Adamson Lady Falcons	72–59	UST Tigresses
Adamson wins series in one game

Filoil Flying V Arena, San Juan

=== Finals ===
September 25

FEU Lady Tamaraws	69–75	Adamson Lady Falcons

Araneta Coliseum, Quezon City

September 30

FEU Lady Tamaraws	54–56	Adamson Lady Falcons
Adamson wins series 2–0

Araneta Coliseum, Quezon City

- Finals Most Valuable Player: Analyn Almazan (Adamson Lady Falcons)

=== Awards ===
UAAP Season 73 women's basketball champions
Adamson Lady Falcons
Sixth title

- Most Valuable Player: Analyn Almazan (Adamson Lady Falcons)
- Rookie of the Year: Aracelie Abaca (De La Salle Lady Archers)

== Juniors' tournament ==
=== Elimination round ===
==== Team standings ====
Pos	Team	W	L	PCT	GB	Qualification
1	Ateneo Blue Eaglets	14	0	1.000	—	Thrice-to-beat in the Finals (Note: As Ateneo won all of their elimination round games, the stepladder format will be used instead of the regular Final Four format.)
2	UST Tiger Cubs	10	4	.714 (Note: Second-seed playoff: UST 65–58 NU)	4	Twice-to-beat in stepladder round 2
3	NUNS Bullpups (H)	10	4	.714	4	Proceed to stepladder round 1
4	Zobel Junior Archers	7	7	.500 (Note: Fourth-seed playoff: La Salle 66–60 FEU)	7	Proceed to stepladder round 1
5	FEU–D Baby Tamaraws	7	7	.500	7	
6	Adamson Baby Falcons	6	8	.429	8	
7	UE Junior Red Warriors	2	12	.143	12	
8	UPIS Junior Fighting Maroons	0	14	.000	14	

Source: ABS-CBN Sports
Rules for classification: 1) winning percentage; 2) if tied for #2 or #4, one-game playoff; 3) head-to-head record; 4) head-to-head point differential; 5) overall point differential
(H) Hosts

==== Match-up results ====
	Round 1							Round 2						
Team ╲ Game	1	2	3	4	5	6	7	8	9	10	11	12	13	14
Adamson	UP school colors	La Salle school colors	NU school colors	Ateneo school colors	FEU school colors	UST school colors	UE school colors	NU school colors	FEU school colors	Ateneo school colors	La Salle school colors	UP school colors	UE school colors	UST school colors
Ateneo	UST school colors	UE school colors	FEU school colors	Adamson school colors	NU school colors	UP school colors	La Salle school colors	UST school colors	UE school colors	Adamson school colors	UP school colors	La Salle school colors	FEU school colors	NU school colors
DLSZ	FEU school colors	Adamson school colors	UST school colors	NU school colors	UP school colors	UE school colors	Ateneo school colors	UE school colors	UST school colors	UP school colors	Adamson school colors	Ateneo school colors	NU school colors	FEU school colors
FEU–FERN	La Salle school colors	UP school colors	Ateneo school colors	UE school colors	Adamson school colors	NU school colors	UST school colors	UP school colors	Adamson school colors	UE school colors	UST school colors	NU school colors	Ateneo school colors	La Salle school colors
NSNU	UE school colors	UST school colors	Adamson school colors	La Salle school colors	Ateneo school colors	FEU school colors	UP school colors	Adamson school colors	UP school colors	UST school colors	UE school colors	FEU school colors	La Salle school colors	Ateneo school colors
UE	NU school colors	Ateneo school colors	UP school colors	FEU school colors	UST school colors	La Salle school colors	Adamson school colors	La Salle school colors	Ateneo school colors	FEU school colors	NU school colors	UST school colors	Adamson school colors	UP school colors
UPIS	Adamson school colors	FEU school colors	UE school colors	UST school colors	La Salle school colors	Ateneo school colors	NU school colors	FEU school colors	NU school colors	La Salle school colors	Ateneo school colors	Adamson school colors	UST school colors	UE school colors
UST	Ateneo school colors	NU school colors	La Salle school colors	UP school colors	UE school colors	Adamson school colors	FEU school colors	Ateneo school colors	La Salle school colors	NU school colors	FEU school colors	UE school colors	UP school colors	Adamson school colors

= Win; = OT win; = Loss; = OT loss

=== Fourth seed playoff ===
September 5

4th seed

FEU–D Baby Tamaraws	60–66	Zobel Junior Archers
DLSZ advances to the Final Four

Filoil Flying V Arena, San Juan

=== Second seed playoff ===
September 5

2nd seed

NUNS Bullpups	58–65	UST Tiger Cubs
UST wins the twice–to–beat advantage

Filoil Flying V Arena, San Juan

=== Bracket ===
Stepladder round 1 (Single-elimination)
3	NU	54
4	La Salle	57

Stepladder round 2 (No. 2 twice-to-beat)
2	UST	74
4	La Salle	60

Finals (No. 1 thrice-to-beat)
1	Ateneo	71	76	76
2	UST	77	66	59

=== Stepladder semifinals ===
==== (3) NU vs. (4) DLSZ ====
This is a single-elimination game.

September 7

NUNS Bullpups	54–57	Zobel Junior Archers
DLSZ advances to the stepladder semifinals round 2

Filoil Flying V Arena, San Juan

==== (2) UST vs. (4) DLSZ ====
UST has the twice-to-beat advantage, where they only have to win once, while their opponents twice, to progress.

September 11

UST Tiger Cubs	74–60	Zobel Junior Archers
UST wins series in one game

Filoil Flying V Arena, San Juan

=== Finals ===
Ateneo has to win two times, while their opponent has to win three times.

September 14

Ateneo Blue Eaglets	71–77	UST Tiger Cubs

Filoil Flying V Arena, San Juan

September 16

Ateneo Blue Eaglets	76–66	UST Tiger Cubs

Araneta Coliseum, Quezon City

September 19

Ateneo Blue Eaglets	76–59	UST Tiger Cubs
Ateneo wins series in three games

Araneta Coliseum, Quezon City

- Finals Most Valuable Player: Kiefer Ravena (Ateneo Blue Eaglets)

=== Awards ===
UAAP Season 73 juniors' basketball champions
Ateneo Blue Eaglets
17th title, third consecutive title

- Most Valuable Player: Kevin Ferrer (UST Tiger Cubs)
- Rookie of the Year: Roque Estoce (NUNS Bullpups)

== See also ==
- NCAA Season 86 basketball tournaments

Preceded by Season 72 (2009)	UAAP basketball seasons Season 73 (2010)	Succeeded by Season 74 (2011)
