= 2010 UST Growling Tigers basketball team =

Philippine college basketball season

2010 UST Growling Tigers men's basketball

Record
- Elims rank: #7
- Final rank: #7
- 2010 record: 4–10
- Head coach: Pido Jarencio (5th season)
- Assistant coaches: Senen Dueñas; Emmanuel Calipes
- Captain: AC Marquez (3rd season)

The 2010 UST Growling Tigers men's basketball team represented University of Santo Tomas in the 73rd season of the University Athletic Association of the Philippines. The men's basketball tournament for the school year 2010-11 began on July 10, 2010 and the host school for the season was De La Salle University.

UST finished seventh at the end of the double round-robin eliminations. They won four games against ten losses, giving head coach Pido Jarencio his worst win–loss record in the UAAP.

They had an average winning margin of 3.0 points and an average losing margin of 7.7 points.

Two of their games went into overtime. The first was an 87–81 win over the UP Fighting Maroons in the first round, and the other was a 76–81 double-overtime loss to the Adamson Falcons in the second round.

The Tigers tied Adamson's 2008 record of most three-point shots made in a game which they did twice, both in the first round. They made 16 three-point shots in their overtime win against UP and then repeated the feat against Adamson for a 55.2 field goal percentage.

== Roster ==
UST Growling Tigers roster
Players
Coaches

Pos.	No.	Nat.	Name	Height	Year	High School
SF	5	(Philippines)	Kim Kaizen Lo	6'1" (1.85m)	1st	St. Jude Catholic School
PG	6	(Philippines)	Edcor Marata	5'10" (1.78m)	1st	University of the Visayas
PG	7	(Philippines)	Jeric Marco Fortuna	5'7" (1.7m)	3rd	De La Salle Santiago Zobel School
PF	8	(Philippines)	Carmelo Afuang	6'4" (1.93m)	3rd	San Beda College–Rizal
SG	9	(Philippines)	Clark Daniel Oliver Bautista	5'9" (1.75m)	3rd	Benedictine International School
SF	10	(Philippines)	Aljon Mariano	6'3" (1.91m)	2nd	San Beda College–Rizal
PF	11	(Philippines)	Andre Charles Marquez (C)	6'3" (1.91m)	3rd	La Salle Greenhills
PF	12	(United States)	Christopher Camus	6'4" (1.93m)	4th	Sunny Hills High School
C	13	(Philippines)	Paulo Lorenzo Pe	6'4" (1.93m)	1st	Ateneo de Manila
C	14	(Philippines)	Vincent Roberto Tinte	6'7" (2.01m)	1st	Urdaneta City National High School
SG	16	(Philippines)	Jeric Allen Teng	6'2" (1.88m)	2nd	Xavier School
SG	17	(Philippines)	Fritz Harmon Delgado	6'0" (1.83m)	1st	San Sebastian College-Recoletos
SF	18	(Philippines)	Eduardo Daquioag, Jr.	6'1" (1.85m)	1st	RTU Laboratory High School
SG	19	(Philippines)	Eduardo Aytona, Jr.	5'10" (1.78m)	2nd	University of Santo Tomas
C	20	(Philippines)	Kenneth Mamaril	6'5" (1.96m)	1st	San Sebastian College-Recoletos
PG	21	(Philippines)	Jackson Wong	5'10" (1.78m)	2nd	Philippine Academy of Sakya-Manila

Head coach

- (Philippines) Alfredo Jarencio

Assistant coach(es)

- Senen Dueñas
- Emmanuel Calipes
- Ma. Genevieve Francisco
- Rodil Sablan

Strength & conditioning coach(es)

- Yi Ming Liu

Team manager

- Clarence Aytona
- Timmy Chong
- Rudy Yu

Legend

- (C) Team captain
- Injured

- Roster

=== Depth chart ===
Pos.	Starting 5	Bench 1	Bench 2
C	Pe	Mamaril	Tinte
PF	Camus	Afuang	Marquez
SF	Mariano	Daquioag	Lo
SG	Teng	Bautista	Marata
PG	Fortuna	Aytona	Wong

== Roster changes ==
The Growling Tigers have lost Season 72 MVP and scoring leader Dylan Ababou as well as Khasim Mirza and Allein Maliksi to graduation, while Tiger Cubs and incoming college freshmen Kyle Neypes and Cedric Labing-isa, both of whom were shoo-ins to the UST Senior team decided to join the rival NU Bulldogs.

This year's roster includes Season 72 Rookie of the Year Jeric Teng, three-point specialists Jeric Fortuna and Tata Bautista, and big man Chris Camus among a handful of veterans. Nearly half of the roster are rookies with Ilocos Norte standout Ed Daquioag who was a former high school teammate of Bautista and Cebuano guard Pipoy Marata, who was named NBTC's Most Outstanding Player leading the pack.

=== Subtractions ===
Pos.	No.	Nat.	Player	Height	Year	High school	Notes
C	5	(Philippines)	Darell John Green	6' 3"	2nd	Colegio de San Juan de Letran	Academic deficiencies
SF	6	(Philippines)	Dylan Simon Ababou	6' 3"	5th	Siena College of Quezon City	Graduated
SF	13	(United Arab Emirates)	Hadi Rushdy	6' 2"	2nd	Colegio San Agustin – Makati	Academic deficiencies
SF	14	(Philippines)	Khasim Ali Mirza	6' 4"	5th	La Salle College Antipolo	Graduated
SG	17	(Philippines)	Aljohn Gil Ungria	6' 1"	2nd	Colegio de San Lorenzo	Relegated to Team B
PF	18	(Philippines)	Allein Gail Maliksi	6' 4"	4th	Camarin High School	Graduated
SG	20	(Philippines)	Andrew Joseph Felix	5' 11"	2nd	PAREF Southridge School	Academic deficiencies
SF	21	(Philippines)	Marco Martin Cam	6' 0"	2nd	San Sebastian College-Recoletos	Transferred to College of Saint Benilde

=== Additions ===
Pos.	No.	Nat.	Player	Height	Year	High school	Notes
SF	5	(Philippines)	Kim Kaizen Lo	6' 1"	1st	St. Jude Catholic School	Rookie
PG	6	(Philippines)	Edcor Marata	5' 10"	1st	University of the Visayas	Rookie
C	13	(Philippines)	Paulo Lorenzo Pe	6' 4"	1st	Ateneo de Manila	Rookie
C	14	(Philippines)	Vincent Roberto Tinte	6' 7"	1st	Urdaneta City National High School	Transferred from Far Eastern University
SG	17	(Philippines)	Fritz Harmon Delgado	6' 0"	1st	San Sebastian College-Recoletos	Rookie
SF	18	(Philippines)	Eduardo Daquioag, Jr.	6' 1"	1st	RTU Laboratory High School	Rookie
C	20	(Philippines)	Kenneth Mamaril	6' 5"	1st	San Sebastian College-Recoletos	Promoted from Team B
PG	21	(Philippines)	Jackson Wong	5' 10"	2nd	Philippine Academy of Sakya-Manila	Returning from Season 71

== Schedule and results ==
=== Preseason tournaments ===
In October 2009, speculations that head coach Pido Jarencio had been fired began to surface. This was related to the past unsuccessful seasons that followed their 2006 championship. Manila Bulletin had written an article about it on October 5, but the school's Institute of Physical Education and Athletics officials, namely Director Fr. Ermito de Sagon and Assistant Director Mrs. Felicitas Francisco were quick to dismiss them as rumors. Jarencio's live contract will expire in March 2010 and from then officials will make an assessment of his tenure. The coach himself dismissed the rumor during an interview in July. He had confirmed receiving offers from the NU Bulldogs, but also said that he "never thought of leaving UST unless they didn't want him there anymore."

Jarencio's contract was extended to December 2010.

According to Jarencio, "UST did not join the major preseason games for fear that it would affect the morale of the players." Another reason for skipping the summer tournaments was the problems that they encountered in recruiting players. UST Tiger Cubs standouts Neypes and Labing-isa have decided to play for National University after graduation and are currently undergoing residency. Neypes was actually included in the Bulldogs' roster when they competed in the 2010 Filoil Preseason Cup.

Preseason game log

2010 Millennium Basketball League–Open Basketball championship: 1–4
Game	Date • Time	Opponent	Result	Record	High points	High rebounds	High assists	Location
1	Apr 9	Foscon Ship Management	L 80–83	0–1	Teng (18)			Lyceum Gym; Manila
2	Apr 17	Lyceum Pirates	W 88–85	1–1	Fortuna (20)			Lyceum Gym; Manila
3	Apr 22	Forward Taguig	L 83–92	1–2	Bautista (39)			Lyceum Gym; Manila
4	May 20	MLQU Stallions	L 96–98	1–3	Teng (23)			Tiger City Gym; Mandaluyong
5	May 26	Foscon Ship Management	L 65–75	1–4	Fortuna (24)			Aquinas Gym; San Juan

(#) Tournament seedings in parentheses.
All times are in UTC+08:00.

=== UAAP games ===
Elimination games were played in a double round-robin format and all of UST's games were aired on Studio 23 and Balls.

UAAP Season 73 game log

Elimination round: 4–10
Game	Date • Time	Opponent	Result	Record	High points	High rebounds	High assists	Location
1	Jul 10 • 4:00 pm	UE Red Warriors	W 80–67	1–0	Teng (15)	Camus (15)	Fortuna (4)	Araneta Coliseum; Quezon City
2	Jul 18 • 2:00 pm	Ateneo Blue Eagles	L 56–68	1–1	Bautista (11)	Camus (10)	Fortuna (3)	PhilSports Arena; Pasig
3	Jul 22 • 2:00 pm	UP Fighting Maroons	W 87–81^{OT}	2–1	Fortuna (29)	Tied (6)	Daquioag (4)	Araneta Coliseum; Quezon City
4	Jul 25 • 4:00 pm	Adamson Soaring Falcons	L 71–75	2–2	Teng (23)	Camus (12)	Tied (6)	PhilSports Arena; Pasig
5	Jul 29 • 4:00 pm	NU Bulldogs	W 59–58	3–2	Afuang (15)	Camus (7)	Fortuna (9)	Araneta Coliseum; Quezon City
6	Aug 1 • 4:00 pm	De La Salle Green Archers	L 53–61	3–3	Bautista (18)	Fortuna (7)	Tied (5)	PhilSports Arena; Pasig
7	Aug 7 • 4:00 pm	FEU Tamaraws; End of R1 of eliminations	L 57–65	3–4	Camus (16)	Camus (14)	Fortuna (7)	The Arena; San Juan
8	Aug 12 • 2:00 pm	UE Red Warriors	L 65–75	3–5	Fortuna (14)	Afuang (11)	Bautista (3)	Araneta Coliseum; Quezon City
9	Aug 15 • 4:00 pm	Adamson Soaring Falcons	L 76–81^{2OT}	3–6	Camus (17)	Camus (14)	Tied (2)	PhilSports Arena; Pasig
10	Aug 21 • 4:00 pm	FEU Tamaraws	L 67–76	3–7	Fortuna (12)	Afuang (9)	Fortuna (7)	PhilSports Arena; Pasig
11	Aug 28 • 2:00 pm	UP Fighting Maroons	W 68–66	4–7	Teng (17)	Afuang (8)	Fortuna (4)	Araneta Coliseum; Quezon City
12	Sep 2 • 4:00 pm	De La Salle Green Archers	L 69–78	4–8	Afuang (19)	Camus (9)	Fortuna (5)	Araneta Coliseum; Quezon City
13	Sep 5 • 4:00 pm	Ateneo Blue Eagles	L 77–81	4–9	Teng (23)	Afuang (9)	Fortuna (8)	Araneta Coliseum; Quezon City
14	Sep 9 • 2:00 pm	NU Bulldogs; End of R2 of eliminations	L 54–62	4–10	Teng (20)	Pe (9)	Tied (3)	Araneta Coliseum; Quezon City

(#) Tournament seedings in parentheses.
All times are in UTC+08:00.
Source: inboundPASS

== UAAP statistics ==
Player	GP	GS	MPG	FGM	FGA	FG%	3PM	3PA	3P%	FTM	FTA	FT%	RPG	APG	SPG	BPG	TOV	PPG
Jeric Teng	14		29.4	63	173	36.4	26	77	33.8	29	42	69.0	4.3	1.9	0.8	0.1	2.7	12.9
Tata Bautista	14		21.1	47	131	35.9	40	111	36.0	22	30	73.3	1.3	1.2	0.6	0.1	1.3	11.1
Jeric Fortuna	14		33.2	55	157	35.0	22	66	33.3	13	18	72.2	3.6	4.7	1.1	0.1	3.1	10.4
Chris Camus	14		31.7	56	141	39.7	4	18	22.2	14	33	42.4	8.9	1.6	1.1	0.7	1.9	9.3
Melo Afuang	14		24.9	47	102	46.1	1	7	14.3	22	31	71.0	6.4	0.8	0.6	0.4	2.1	8.4
Aljon Mariano	14		19.4	42	87	48.3	14	28	50.0	10	19	52.6	3.0	0.9	0.2	0.4	1.9	7.7
Paolo Pe	14		21.1	21	51	41.2	0	1	0.0	5	15	33.3	3.7	0.4	0.2	0.4	1.2	3.3
Ed Daquioag	14		9.2	14	36	38.9	4	17	23.5	6	12	50.0	1.4	0.9	0.6	0.0	0.9	2.7
Eddie Aytona	12		4.8	3	12	25.0	0	2	0.0	2	2	100.0	0.3	0.1	0.0	0.0	0.5	0.7
Pipoy Marata	6		2.8	2	3	66.7	0	0	0.0	0	0	0.0	0.3	0.0	0.0	0.0	0.8	0.7
Kenneth Mamaril	12		2.7	2	3	66.7	0	0	0.0	0	0	0.0	0.6	0.8	0.0	0.2	0.5	0.3
Vince Tinte	8		2.9	1	2	50.0	0	0	0.0	0	0	0.0	0.8	0.1	0.0	0.1	0.0	0.3
Kim Lo	11		4.2	0	7	0.0	0	0	0.0	0	0	0.0	0.6	0.4	0.0	0.1	0.2	0.0
Jackson Wong	8		2.4	0	0	0.0	0	0	0.0	0	0	0.0	0.4	0.0	0.0	0.0	0.9	0.0
AC Marquez	5		4.0	0	3	0.0	0	0	0.0	0	0	0.0	0.6	0.0	0.0	0.0	0.0	0.0
Total	14		41.1	353	908	38.9	111	327	33.9	123	200	61.5	34.9	12.8	5.3	2.5	16.9	67.1
Opponents	14		41.1	369	865	42.6	66	253	26.1	189	307	61.6	38.7	15.6	5.6	3.8	16.7	71.0

Legend
GP	Games played	GS	Games started	MPG	Minutes per game
FGM	Field-goal made	FGA	Field-goal attempts	FG%	Field-goal percentage
3PM	3-point field-goal made	3PA	3-point field-goal attempts	3P%	3-point field-goal percentage
FTM	Free-throw made	FTA	Free-throw attempts	FT%	Free-throw percentage
RPG	Rebounds per game	APG	Assists per game	SPG	Steals per game
BPG	Blocks per game	TOV	Turnovers per game	PPG	Points per game

Source: inboundPASS

== Aftermath ==
Because the Growling Tigers did not participate in any major preseason tournaments, they were not scouted by the other UAAP schools and were able to pull off wins early in the first round of eliminations. They were even third in the standings at 3–2 at one point late in the first round.

Like the other UST Growling Tigers teams, the 2010 squad had heavily relied on their three-point shooting, and when their shots had failed to connect, the losses began to pile up, mostly on double-digit deficits.

According to head coach Pido Jarencio, this team was more of a stop-gap in preparation for the university's quadricentennial celebration. "Some of the players I recruited are really made for 2011." One of the players that he was referring to was incoming Cameroonian rookie Karim Abdul who had undergone a one year residency and will be able to suit up for the Tigers next season to beef up the team's short front line.

Jarencio who has a deep pool of players from the Team B training team, has plans for a major revamp on the current team. "If nothing happens (to UST) next year, I will exit the team," added the coach.
