= Southern City Colleges =

Private college in Zamboanga City, Philippines

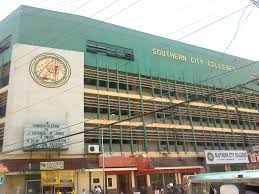
- Former names: Southern Academy (1946–1952); Southern College of Commerce (1952–1962)
- Motto: Triumph in Tenacity
- Type: Private Non-sectarian
- Established: 1946
- President: Edwin M. Caliolio
- Location: Zamboanga City, Philippines; 6°54′17″N 122°04′49″E
- Campus: Central Campus: Pilar Street, Zamboanga City West Campus: San Jose Gusu, Zamboanga City East Campus: Divisoria, Zamboanga City
- Colours: Green; Golden Yellow
- Mascot: SCC Bulldogs
- Website: www.scci.edu.ph
- Location in Mindanao Location in the Philippines

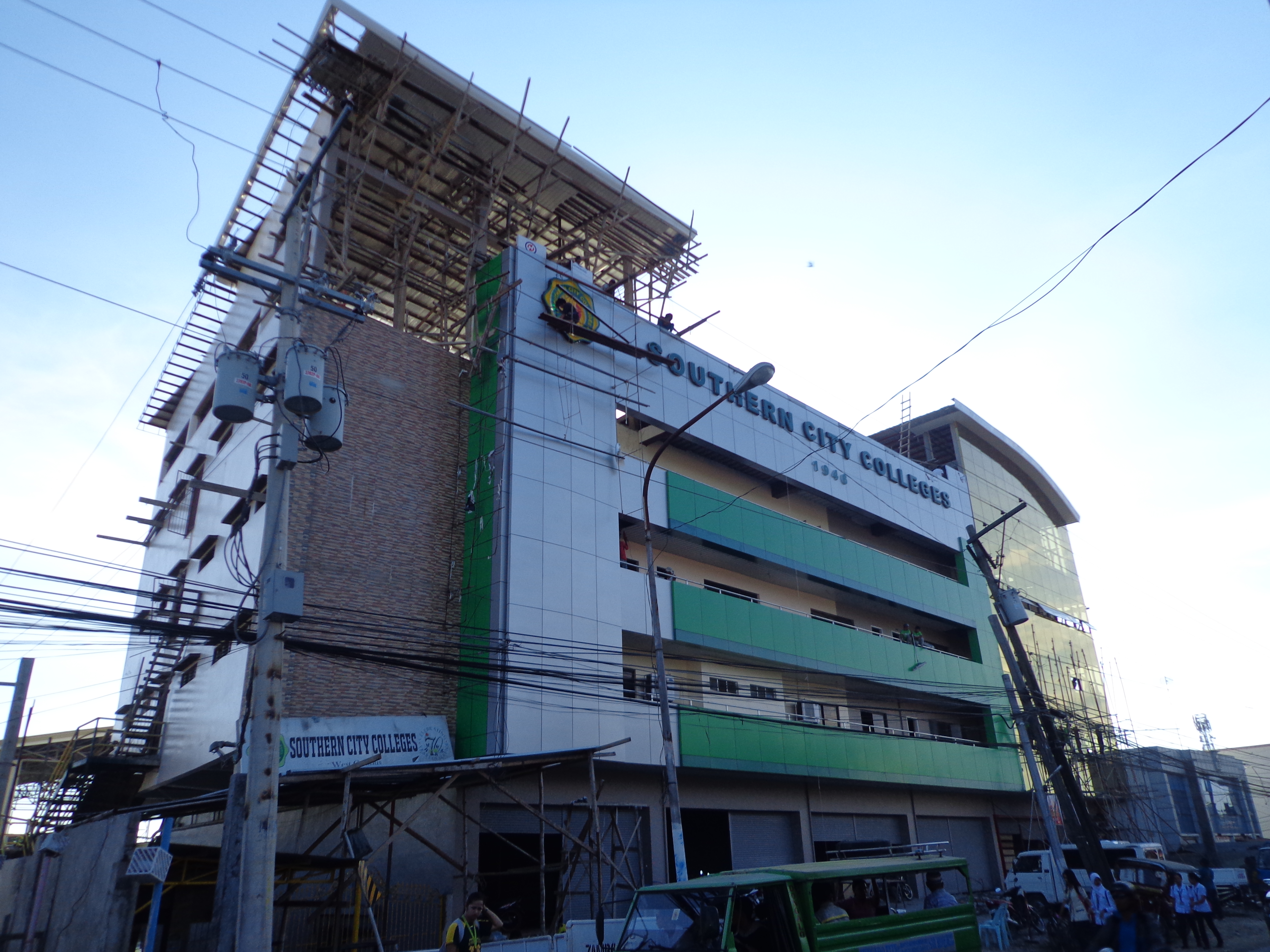
The Aracelie F. Caliolio Learning Resource Center which is currently under construction.

Southern City Colleges is a private non-sectarian college in Zamboanga City. It was founded on December 8, 1946, by Francisco M. Caliolio, Sr. and his wife, Arecelie F. Caliolio. The institution is now managed by their grandchildren and is headed by Edwin M. Caliolio as its president. It was once established as Southern Academy in 1946, then renamed as Southern College of Commerce in 1952 and as Southern City Colleges in 1962.

It presently has three campuses, namely the Central Campus, the West Campus (the former MEIN College) and the East Campus, all located in Zamboanga City.

== Notable persons ==
- Mr. Edwin Caliolio - was awarded with a Command Plaque, Academe Sector.
- Abdulmaid Muin - An alumnus to the college who is now the Philippine ambassador to East Timor.
- Ryan Roose B. "RR" Garcia - a PBA basketball player for TNT KaTropa, once played for the school's basketball team.
- Rudy B. Lingganay Jr. - a PBA basketball player for NLEX Road Warriors.
- Chico A. Lanete - a PBA basketball player for Phoenix Fuel Masters.
