= Ryan Buenafe =

Filipino basketball player

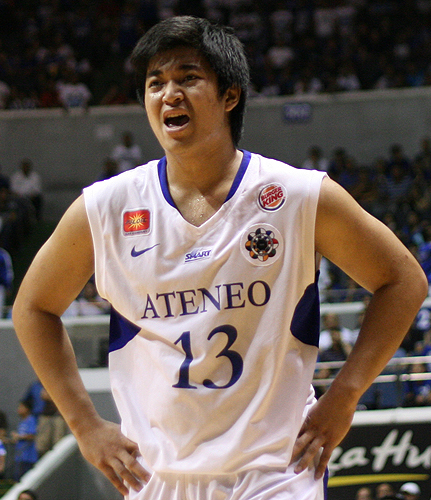
- Buenafe in 2010

Personal information
- Born: February 1, 1990 (age 36) Pasay, Philippines
- Listed height: 6 ft 2 in (1.88 m)
- Listed weight: 225 lb (102 kg)

Career information
- High school: San Sebastian (Manila)
- College: Ateneo (2008–2012)
- PBA draft: 2013: 1st round, 8th overall pick
- Drafted by: Alaska Aces
- Playing career: 2013–2021
- Position: Shooting guard / small forward

Career history
- 2013–2014: Alaska Aces
- 2014–2017: Meralco Bolts
- 2018: Laguna Heroes
- 2018–2020: Zamboanga Valientes
- 2021: Siquijor Mystics

Career highlights
- 4× UAAP champion (2008–2010, 2012); 2× UNIGAMES champion (2008, 2009); Nike Summer League champion (2008); PCCL champion (2009); UAAP Rookie of the Year (2008); UAAP All-Rookie Team (2008); UAAP Finals MVP (2010)

Ryan Clarence Buenafe (born February 1, 1990) is a Filipino former professional basketball player. From a highly touted high school basketball career with the San Sebastian College–Recoletos Staglets, Buenafe played college basketball for the Ateneo de Manila University Blue Eagles of the University Athletic Association of the Philippines (UAAP) from 2008 to 2012. He was selected 8th overall in the 2013 PBA draft by the Alaska Aces.

As a member of the Siquijor Mystics, Buenafe was involved in a controversial 2021 Pilipinas VisMin Super Cup game against the Lapu-Lapu City Heroes. The scandal caused the Pilipinas VisMin Super Cup to impose a lifetime ban on the members of Siquijor, including Buenafe. In October 2021, after a six-month investigation, the Philippine Games and Amusements Board revoked Buenafe's professional license, along with other members of the Mystics, effectively barring them from playing professional basketball in the Philippines.

== PBA career statistics ==
Legend
GP	Games played	MPG	Minutes per game
FG%	Field-goal percentage	3P%	3-point field-goal percentage	FT%	Free-throw percentage
RPG	Rebounds per game	APG	Assists per game	SPG	Steals per game
BPG	Blocks per game	PPG	Points per game	**Bold**	Career high

=== Season-by-season averages ===
Year	Team	GP	MPG	FG%	3P%	FT%	RPG	APG	SPG	BPG	PPG
2013–14	Alaska	9	7.1	**.500**	**.667**	.250	1.0	.1	.0	.0	1.9
2014–15	Meralco	14	**10.0**	.333	.286	.500	**2.8**	.4	.2	.0	2.1
2015–16	Meralco	**28**	8.5	.381	.353	**.842**	1.1	**.8**	**.5**	**.1**	**2.7**
Career		51	8.7	.381	.370	.667	1.5	.5	.3	.0	2.4
