= RR Garcia =

Filipino basketball player (born 1990)

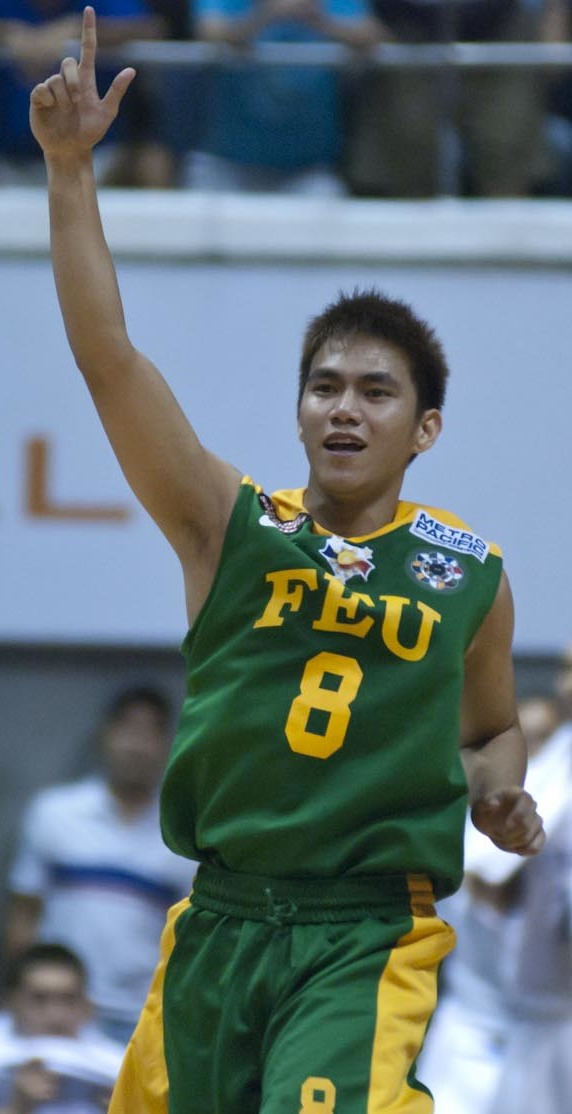
- Garcia in 2010

No. 1 – Titan Ultra Giant Risers
- Position: Point guard / Assistant coach
- League: PBA

Personal information
- Born: January 12, 1990 (age 36) Zamboanga City, Philippines
- Listed height: 5 ft 11 in (1.80 m)
- Listed weight: 165 lb (75 kg)

Career information
- High school: Southern City Colleges (Zamboanga City)
- College: FEU
- PBA draft: 2013: 1st round, 6th overall pick
- Drafted by: Barako Bull Energy Cola
- Playing career: 2013–present

Career history

Playing
- 2013–2014: GlobalPort Batang Pier
- 2014–2016: Barako Bull Energy
- 2016: Phoenix Fuel Masters
- 2016: Star Hotshots
- 2016–2017: San Miguel Beermen
- 2017–2018: TNT KaTropa
- 2019–2025: Phoenix Pulse Fuel Masters / Phoenix Super LPG Fuel Masters / Phoenix Fuel Masters
- 2026–present: Titan Ultra Giant Risers

Coaching
- 2026–present: Lyceum (assistant)

Career highlights
- PBA champion (2016–17 Philippine); 3× PBA All-Star (2016, 2017, 2018); UAAP Most Valuable Player (2010); UAAP Mythical Five (2010)

Ryan Roose B. Garcia (born January 12, 1990) is a Filipino professional basketball player for the Titan Ultra Giant Risers of the Philippine Basketball Association (PBA) and is currently an Assistant Coach for the Lyceum Pirates for the National Collegiate Athletic Association (Philippines) (NCAA). He was selected 6th overall in the 2013 PBA draft by the Barako Bull Energy Cola.

== Early life ==
Garcia learned how to play basketball at the age of eight. In his first year of high school, he won the MVP award while playing for Southern City Colleges in his hometown of Zamboanga City.

== College career ==
Garcia played for the FEU Tamaraws of the University Athletic Association of the Philippines (UAAP) after trying out for other schools such as San Beda and Letran. He also wanted to play for FEU because of the success of Zamboangueños there, including Jens Knuttel and Mark Barroca. He first spent a year in their Team B as he was on the RP Youth Team, and active national team members were not allowed to play in the UAAP.

In his rookie season, he won a Player of the Week award for helping FEU secure a slot in the Final Four with 25 points and 17 points in wins over the Adamson Soaring Falcons and the UP Fighting Maroons. In the Final Four, they lost twice to the UE Red Warriors.

Garcia started out his sophomore season by tying his career-high of 25 points in a win over Ateneo. From there, the Tamaraws started the season 5–0. A win over the UST Growling Tigers in which he led with 22 points, four rebounds, and four assists gave the Tamaraws a sweep of the first round. As the top seed, FEU made the Finals, but lost to the Ateneo Blue Eagles. For that season, he was the league's MVP, the first point guard to win the award since Johnny Abarrientos in 1991, also a former Tamaraw. After he won the award, San Beda and other schools tried to recruit him to their teams, but he decided to stay with FEU.

In a Season 74 loss to Adamson, Garcia scored 20 points. In a loss to UP, he scored 17 points. Despite the loss, they remained in second place. They almost beat Ateneo twice in back to back games, but lost both of those games. He then tied his career-high in a rematch with UP, scoring 14 of his 25 points in the clutch as FEU got a come-from-behind win. Once again, FEU faced Ateneo in the Finals. In Game 1, he contributed eight assists, but only scored six points as FEU lost. They then lost Game 2, and Ateneo won the championship once again.

In the offseason, Garcia played for the NLEX Road Warriors, playing a key role in the semifinals and helping NLEX win the 2011 PBA D-League Aspirants Cup. In a win over UST, he produced 21 points, five rebounds, seven assists, and made all four of his triples and the game-winning layup. After starting with four straight wins, they got their first loss against the NU Bulldogs. In their rematch, he made the game-winning lay-up. However, the win was protested by NU, who claimed that Garcia's shot didn't count as the buzzer already sounded when he shot the ball. The UAAP Board of Trustees ordered a rematch between FEU and NU. In that rematch, NU won, which forced a three-way tie for the final two slots in the Final Four. FEU then lost a play-off for the final slot to the DLSU Green Archers, and he missed the Final Four for the first time in his collegiate career.

In a game against UE, Garcia was slapped with an unsportsmanlike foul for throwing the ball at a UE player. FEU started out the season with a sweep of the first round, then lost two straight games. He was then suspended for a game after picking up another unsportsmanlike foul, in which he swung an elbow at a DLSU player. In the playoffs, FEU lost to DLSU.

In his stint with FEU, he was one of the team's top players and led the Tamaraws along with his backcourt partner Terrence Romeo and big man Aldrech Ramos. However, he did not win a championship with the Tamaraws.

== Professional career ==
=== GlobalPort Batang Pier ===
Garcia was selected by GlobalPort Batang Pier sixth overall in the 2013 PBA draft, who sent Denok Miranda to Barako Bull Energy for the pick. Most coaches rated him as the best point guard in the draft. Being picked by GlobalPort reunited him with Romeo, who was selected right before him in that same draft, and was his backcourt partner at FEU. They both got max contracts of P8.5 million for three years.

In his debut against the Petron Blaze Boosters, Garcia scored only four points in 18 minutes. He then scored 20 points in a loss to Barangay Ginebra. In a win over the Rain or Shine Elasto Painters, he scored 13 points and made two three-pointers.

=== Barako Bull ===
On June 20, 2014, Garcia was traded to Barako Bull Energy in exchange for Keith Jensen. In a 2014–15 Philippine Cup game against his former team, he limited Romeo to just nine points as he scored 12 points, but Barako lost that game. Against the Blackwater Elite, he led the team in scoring with 16 points as they picked up the win. In a win over NLEX that guaranteed Barako a spot in the playoffs, he scored 22 points and made clutch plays. In the playoffs, they were eliminated in the first round by the Talk 'N Text Tropang Texters. On May 31, 2015, in a Commissioner's Cup win over Rain or Shine, he scored a season-high 26 points as Barako started with a franchise-best record of 5–1. For that performance, he won a Player of the Week award, the fourth player from Barako to win that award that conference after JC Intal, Dylan Ababou and Joseph Yeo.

In the 2015–16 Philippine Cup, after losing their first game of the season, Garcia scored 10 of his 16 points in the fourth quarter to lead Barako to their first win of the conference. He then scored 16 of his 26 points in the fourth quarter as they won over the Mahindra Enforcer. However, he then suffered a shoulder injury as he was scoring 22 points against Talk 'N Text, which the team was still able to win. Due to the injury, he was not able to play in Barako's next games, including their quarterfinal match against GlobalPort.

=== Phoenix Fuel Masters ===
Before the start of the 2016 Commissioner's Cup, Phoenix Petroleum bought the team, and Barako became known as the Phoenix Fuel Masters. In the franchise's first-ever win, against the NLEX Road Warriors, Garcia scored a career-high 33 points with six assists and two steals. They then lost three straight games before getting another win over Mahindra in which he scored 22 points on four triples. In their next game against Ginebra, he scored 23 points, nine assists, six rebounds, and two clutch three-pointers, but they lost to a game-winning shot by LA Tenorio. In Phoenix's last game of the conference, he led the team with 21 points, four rebounds, and six assists, but they lost to GlobalPort, and didn't qualify for the playoffs.

=== Star Hotshots ===
On May 11, 2016, Garcia was traded to the Star Hotshots along with Rodney Brondial for two rookies Mark Cruz and Norbert Torres along with veteran Jonathan Uyloan. In an overtime win over GlobalPort, he scored 26 points on 11-for-13 shooting, including the game-tying layup with 8.6 seconds remaining in regulation. For that performance, he earned a Player of the Week award. That season, he got his first PBA All-Star appearance.

=== San Miguel Beermen ===
On November 3, 2016, Garcia was traded to the Mahindra Floodbuster along with Alex Mallari in exchange for Aldrech Ramos & Mahindra's 2017 2nd-round pick, and then Mahindra dealt RR Garcia along with Keith Agovida to the San Miguel Beermen in exchange for Ryan Araña & SMB's 2018 1st-round pick. In a win over the Alaska Aces, he contributed 13 points and a clutch steal. On his 27th birthday, he scored 17 points on four triples, with three rebounds and two assists in a win over Rain or Shine. In the Beermen's quarterfinal match against Rain or Shine, he led with 25 points on 7-of-11 shooting, with 5-of-7 shooting from three, and also contributed three rebounds and two assists. With the win, he got into the semifinals for the first time in his PBA career. In the semis, he couldn't play as he contracted the flu. In the 2016–17 Philippine Cup Finals, he aggravated a shoulder injury as the Beermen won him his first championship.

=== TNT KaTropa ===
On April 24, 2017, Garcia was traded by the San Miguel Beermen to the TNT KaTropa in exchange for Matt Ganuelas-Rosser. In his winning debut for the KaTropa against the Beermen, he scored 12 points with two rebounds and three assists. He played a key role for them in their 2017 Commissioner's Cup playoffs, helping them reach the Finals. There, they lost to the Beermen in six games.

In his season debut in a win over Alaska in the 2017–18 Philippine Cup, Garcia scored 11 points. He then scored five clutch points in the final 90 seconds of their game against the KIA Picanto for TNT to get the win. That season, he reunited with Romeo when he was traded to TNT. He was also an All-Star once again, helping his team win over Gilas Pilipinas. However, before the start of the 2019 season, TNT dropped him from their regular roster.

=== Return to Phoenix ===
Garcia attempted to return to the PBA with Rain or Shine, playing for them in a tune-up game. However, he wasn't signed by Rain or Shine for the 2019 Governors' Cup. Instead, he was signed by Phoenix. In his first game back with them, he had nine points, three rebounds, three assists, and a steal in a loss to NLEX. Against the Meralco Bolts, he scored 10 points. He then made 14 points, three assists, two rebounds, a block and also made the game-winning basket against Rain or Shine. He ended his season with 17 points and four rebounds in a win over Blackwater.

Phoenix re-signed Garcia for the 2020 Philippine Cup. He scored 12 points in a win over the Hotshots. At the end of their season, he was given a two-year contract.

Garcia scored a conference-high 18 points in a win over Rain or Shine during the 2021 Philippine Cup. In the Governors' Cup, he scored a conference-high 19 points as he helped Phoenix get into the quarterfinals with a win over the Batang Pier. There, they were eliminated by the Hotshots.

In the 2022 Commissioner's Cup, Garcia started the conference with 13 points in a win over Blackwater. He led the team with 20 points in a 51-point win over the Terrafirma Dyip that secured Phoenix a slot in the quarterfinals. However, he missed the quarterfinals as he was placed under the league's health and safety protocols. In the Governors' Cup, he scored 18 points in a loss to TNT. He then led the team with 17 points in a win over Rain or Shine. At the end of the season, he was given a one-year deal.

== PBA career statistics ==
Legend
GP	Games played	MPG	Minutes per game	FG%	Field-goal percentage
3FG%	3-point field-goal percentage	4P%	4-point field-goal percentage	FT%	Free-throw percentage
RPG	Rebounds per game	APG	Assists per game	SPG	Steals per game
BPG	Blocks per game	PPG	Points per game	127	Career high

As of the end of 2024–25 season

=== Season-by-season averages ===
Year	Team	GP	MPG	FG%	3P%	4P%	FT%	RPG	APG	SPG	BPG	PPG
2013–14	GlobalPort	32	18.9	.346	.306	—	.786	1.7	1.6	.3	—	6.4
2013–14	Barako Bull	32	18.9	.346	.306	—	.786	1.7	1.6	.3	—	6.4
2014–15	Barako Bull	36	25.5	.421	.286	—	.667	2.7	1.8	.7	.1	9.7
2015–16	Barako Bull	30	29.7	.428	.338	—	.793	3.1	2.7	.5	.1	14.6
2015–16	Phoenix	30	29.7	.428	.338	—	.793	3.1	2.7	.5	.1	14.6
2015–16	Star	30	29.7	.428	.338	—	.793	3.1	2.7	.5	.1	14.6
2016–17	San Miguel	41	19.8	.357	.320	—	.828	1.7	2.2	.3	.0	7.8
2016–17	TNT	41	19.8	.357	.320	—	.828	1.7	2.2	.3	.0	7.8
2017–18	TNT	32	14.8	.322	.184	—	.788	1.5	2.2	.3	.0	4.8
2019	Phoenix Pulse	10	23.5	.440	.276	—	.333	2.3	2.0	.4	.3	7.6
2020	Phoenix Super LPG	17	16.4	.413	.395	—	.706	2.1	1.8	.4	.1	6.2
2021	Phoenix Super LPG	25	17.1	.402	.348	—	.625	2.1	2.1	.4	.1	5.6
2022–23	Phoenix Super LPG	35	10.7	.371	.310	—	.912	1.3	1.6	.2	.0	4.2
2023–24	Phoenix Super LPG / Phoenix	22	9.8	.432	.348	—	1.000	1.0	1.4	.2	.1	3.9
2024–25	Phoenix	32	13.4	.416	.303	.321	.762	2.0	1.5	.3	.1	5.9
2025–26	Phoenix	10	12.1	.435	.364	.267	1.000	1.8	2.2	.3	.1	5.4
2025–26	Titan Ultra	10	12.1	.435	.364	.267	1.000	1.8	2.2	.3	.1	5.4
Career		322	17.9	.392	.309	.302	.777	1.9	1.9	.4	.1	7.0

== National team career ==
Garcia played for the RP Youth Team in the 2008 FIBA Asia Under-18 Championship. He helped rally the team from a 10-point deficit in the fourth quarter to an upset win over the hosts Iran. They finished the tournament with a win over Lebanon in which he scored 14 points, and the team finished in seventh place.

In 2011, Garcia was a member of the Philippine team that won the gold medal in the 2011 SEA Games basketball tournament.

== Philanthropy ==
In 2012, Garcia, along with other college basketball players and celebrities participated in a charity basketball game for victims of Typhoon Sendong. The following year, he appeared in a charity basketball game for those affected by the Zamboanga City crisis.
