= UAAP Season 73 =

- "Where Heroes Are Made"
- Host school: De La Salle University

Overall
- Seniors: University of Santo Tomas
- Juniors: University of Santo Tomas

Seniors' champions
Sport		Men	Women
Basketball		Ateneo	Adamson
Volleyball		UST	La Salle
Chess		FEU	La Salle
Table tennis		UST	FEU
Taekwondo		La Salle	UST
Judo		Ateneo	UST
Swimming		UP	UP
Beach Volleyball		FEU	Adamson
Track and field		FEU	FEU
Football		UP	FEU
Fencing		UP	UE
Tennis		UST	La Salle
Badminton		UST	FEU
Baseball		UST	N/A
Softball		N/A	Adamson
- Cheerdance: UP (Ex - Coed)
- Street dance: La Salle (Ex - Coed)

Juniors' champions
Sport		Boys	Girls
Basketball		Ateneo	N/A
Volleyball		UE	La Salle
Chess		FEU	
Table tennis		UE	
Taekwondo		UST	
Judo		Ateneo	
Swimming		Ateneo	UST
Beach Volleyball		UP	
Track and field		FEU	
Football		UE	
- (NT) = No tournament; (DS) = Demonstration Sport; (Ex) = Exhibition;

UAAP Season 73 is the 2010–2011 athletic year of the University Athletic Association of the Philippines. It was hosted by De La Salle University. The men's basketball and the women's volleyball tournaments were aired by ABS-CBN Channel 2 and Studio 23 (the men's basketball events was simulcast over DZRJ-AM) for the eleventh consecutive year following the renewal of the contract for the broadcast of the games. The opening ceremonies were held on July 10, 2010 with the opening game pitting the season host and the UP Fighting Maroons.

== Basketball ==
The UAAP Season 73 basketball tournament began on July 10, 2010 at the Araneta Coliseum in Cubao, Quezon City. The tournament host was De La Salle University and tournament commissioner was Edmundo "Ato" Badolato.

=== Seniors division ===
==== Men's tournament ====
===== Elimination round =====
Pos	Team	W	L	PCT	GB	Qualification
1	FEU Tamaraws	12	2	.857	—	Twice-to-beat in the semifinals
2	Ateneo Blue Eagles	10	4	.714	2	Twice-to-beat in the semifinals
3	Adamson Soaring Falcons	9	5	.643	3	Twice-to-win in the semifinals
4	De La Salle Green Archers (H)	8	6	.571	4	Twice-to-win in the semifinals
5	NU Bulldogs	7	7	.500	5	
6	UE Red Warriors	6	8	.429	6	
7	UST Growling Tigers	4	10	.286	8	
8	UP Fighting Maroons	0	14	.000	12	

Source: ABS-CBN Sports
Rules for classification: 1) winning percentage; 2) if tied for #2 or #4, one-game playoff; 3) head-to-head record; 4) head-to-head point differential; 5) overall point differential
(H) Hosts

===== Playoffs =====
Semifinals (Top 2 twice-to-beat)
1	FEU	69*
4	La Salle	59
2	Ateneo	68
3	Adamson	55

Finals (Best-of-three playoff)
1	FEU	49	62
2	Ateneo	72	65

*Overtime

===== Awards =====
- Most Valuable Player: RR Garcia (FEU Tamaraws)
- Rookie of the Year: Terrence Romeo (FEU Tamaraws)

==== Women's tournament ====
===== Elimination round =====
Pos	Team	W	L	PCT	GB	Qualification
1	FEU Lady Tamaraws	13	1	.929	—	Twice-to-beat in the semifinals
2	Adamson Lady Falcons	13	1	.929	—	Twice-to-beat in the semifinals
3	UST Growling Tigresses	9	5	.643	4	Twice-to-win in the semifinals
4	De La Salle Lady Archers	9	5	.643	4	Twice-to-win in the semifinals
5	NU Lady Bulldogs (H)	4	10	.286	9	
6	UP Lady Maroons	4	10	.286	9	
7	Ateneo Lady Eagles	4	10	.286	9	
8	UE Lady Warriors	0	14	.000	13	

Source: ABS-CBN Sports
Rules for classification: 1) winning percentage; 2) if tied for #2 or #4, one-game playoff; 3) head-to-head record; 4) head-to-head point differential; 5) overall point differential
(H) Hosts

===== Playoffs =====
Semifinals (Top 2 twice-to-beat)
1	FEU	61	65
4	La Salle	64	35
2	Adamson	72
3	UST	59

Finals (Best-of-three playoff)
1	FEU	69	54
2	Adamson	75	56

===== Awards =====
- Most Valuable Player:
- Rookie of the Year:

=== Juniors division ===
==== Elimination round ====
Pos	Team	W	L	PCT	GB	Qualification
1	Ateneo Blue Eaglets	14	0	1.000	—	Thrice-to-beat in the Finals (Note: As Ateneo won all of their elimination round games, the stepladder format will be used instead of the regular Final Four format.)
2	UST Tiger Cubs	10	4	.714 (Note: Second-seed playoff: UST 65–58 NU)	4	Twice-to-beat in stepladder round 2
3	NUNS Bullpups (H)	10	4	.714	4	Proceed to stepladder round 1
4	Zobel Junior Archers	7	7	.500 (Note: Fourth-seed playoff: La Salle 66–60 FEU)	7	Proceed to stepladder round 1
5	FEU–D Baby Tamaraws	7	7	.500	7	
6	Adamson Baby Falcons	6	8	.429	8	
7	UE Junior Red Warriors	2	12	.143	12	
8	UPIS Junior Fighting Maroons	0	14	.000	14	

Source: ABS-CBN Sports
Rules for classification: 1) winning percentage; 2) if tied for #2 or #4, one-game playoff; 3) head-to-head record; 4) head-to-head point differential; 5) overall point differential
(H) Hosts

==== Playoffs ====
Stepladder round 1 (Single-elimination)
3	NU	54
4	La Salle	57

Stepladder round 2 (No. 2 twice-to-beat)
2	UST	74
4	La Salle	60

Finals (No. 1 thrice-to-beat)
1	Ateneo	71	76	76
2	UST	77	66	59

==== Awards ====
- Most Valuable Player:
- Rookie of the Year:

== Volleyball ==
=== Seniors division ===
==== Men's tournament ====
===== Elimination round =====
Pos	Team	Pld	W	L	Pts	SW	SL	SR	SPW	SPL	SPR	Qualification
1	UST Growling Tigers	14	13	1	27	41	7	5.857	1178	896	1.315	Twice-to-beat in the semifinals
2	FEU Tamaraws	14	13	1	27	40	10	4.000	1196	1005	1.190	Twice-to-beat in the semifinals
3	UP Fighting Maroons	14	8	6	22	30	21	1.429	1157	1091	1.060	Twice-to-win in the semifinals
4	De La Salle Green Archers (H)	14	8	6	22	29	22	1.318	1143	1085	1.053	Twice-to-win in the semifinals
5	Adamson Soaring Falcons	14	6	8	20	22	26	0.846	1051	1077	0.976	
6	Ateneo Blue Eagles	14	4	10	18	16	33	0.485	998	1114	0.896	
7	NU Bulldogs	14	3	11	17	15	38	0.395	1085	1244	0.872	
8	UE Red Warriors	14	1	13	15	5	41	0.122	831	1127	0.737	

(H) Host

===== Playoffs =====
Semifinals (Nos. 1 & 2 have twice-to-beat advantage)
1	**UST**	**3**
4	La Salle	2
2	**FEU**	**3**
3	UP	0

Finals (Best-of-three series)
1	**UST**	**3**	**3**
2	FEU	1	0

===== Awards =====
- Most Valuable Player:
- Rookie of the Year:

==== Women's tournament ====
===== Elimination round =====
Pos	Team	Pld	W	L	Pts	SW	SL	SR	SPW	SPL	SPR	Qualification
1	De La Salle Lady Archers (H)	14	13	1	27	39	7	5.571	1051	779	1.349	Twice-to-beat in the semifinals
2	UST Growling Tigresses	14	10	4	24	34	20	1.700	1212	1010	1.200	Twice-to-beat in the semifinals
3	Adamson Lady Falcons	14	9	5	23	31	21	1.476	1124	1077	1.044	Twice-to-win in the semifinals
4	Ateneo Lady Eagles	14	8	6	22	29	19	1.526	1057	958	1.103	Twice-to-win in the semifinals
5	NU Lady Bulldogs	14	5	9	19	22	31	0.710	1079	1125	0.959	
6	FEU Lady Tamaraws	14	5	9	19	22	35	0.629	1125	1237	0.909	
7	UP Lady Maroons	14	3	11	17	15	37	0.405	973	1203	0.809	
8	UE Lady Warriors	14	3	11	17	14	36	0.389	898	1130	0.795	

(H) Host

===== Playoffs =====
Semifinals (Nos. 1 & 2 have twice-to-beat advantage)
1	**La Salle**	**3**
4	Ateneo	2
2	**UST**	**3**
3	Adamson	1

Finals (Best-of-three series)
1	**La Salle**	**3**	**3**
2	UST	2	0

===== Awards =====
- Most Valuable Player: Jacqueline Alarca (De La Salle University)
- Rookie of the Year: Ma. Mikaela Esperanza (De La Salle University)

=== Juniors division ===
==== Boys' tournament ====
With UE sweeping the elimination round, they were declared automatic champions and the playoffs were scrapped.

===== Elimination round =====
Rank	Team	W	L	PCT	GB
1st place, gold medalist(s)	UE Junior Red Warriors	10	0	1.000	--
2nd place, silver medalist(s)	UST Tiger Cubs	8	2	.800	2
3rd place, bronze medalist(s)	NUNS Bullpups	6	4	.600	4
4	**Zobel Junior Archers**				
5	Ateneo Blue Eaglets				
6	UPIS Junior Fighting Maroons				

Host team in boldface.

===== Awards =====
- Most Valuable Player: Kim Gerald Relcopan (UE Junior Red Warriors)
- Rookie of the Year: Edward Camposano (UE Junior Red Warriors)

==== Girls' tournament ====
With De La Salle sweeping the elimination round, they were declared automatic champions and the playoffs were scrapped.

===== Elimination round =====
Rank	Team	W	L	PCT	GB
1st place, gold medalist(s)	**Zobel Junior Archers**	6	0	1.000	--
2nd place, silver medalist(s)	UE Junior Lady Warriors	4	2	.667	2
3rd place, bronze medalist(s)	UPIS Junior Lady Maroons	2	4	.333	4
4	UST Junior Tigresses	0	6	.000	6

Host team in boldface.

===== Awards =====
- Most Valuable Player: Kim Kianna Dy (Zobel Junior Lady Archers)
- Rookie of the Year: Alessandra Isabel Narciso (Zobel Junior Lady Archers)

== Beach Volleyball ==
=== Men's tournament ===
==== Elimination round ====
Team	W	L	GB
FEU Tamaraws	7	0	--
Adamson Soaring Falcons	5	2	2.0
UST Growling Tigers	5	2	2.0
UP Fighting Maroons	4	3	3.0
**De La Salle Green Archers**	3	4	4.0
UE Red Warriors	2	5	5.0
Ateneo Blue Eagles	1	6	6.0
NU Bulldogs	1	6	6.0

Host team is boldfaced.

Qualified to the semifinals
Qualified to the fourth-seed playoff

==== Playoffs ====
First round Knockout game
3	**UST**	**2**
4	UP	1

Semifinal
2	Adamson	1
3	**UST**	**2**

=== Women's tournament ===
==== Elimination round ====
Team	W	L	GB
Adamson Lady Falcons	7	0	--
FEU Lady Tamaraws	5	2	2.0
UST Growling Tigresses	5	2	2.0
**De La Salle Lady Archers**	3	4	4.0
UE Lady Warriors	3	4	4.0
Ateneo Blue Eagles	2	5	5.0
UP Lady Maroons	2	5	5.0
NU Lady Bulldogs	1	6	6.0

Host team in boldface.

Qualified to the semifinals
Qualified to the fourth-seed playoff

==== Playoffs ====
First round Knockout game
3	UST	1
4	**La Salle**	**2**

Semifinal
2	FEU	1
4	**La Salle**	**2**

== Football ==
The UAAP Football will open on January 16, 2011. Games will be played at the Ateneo de Manila University Erenchun and Ocampo Fields.

=== Men's tournament ===
==== Elimination round ====
===== Team standings =====
Team	Pld	W	D	L	GF	GA	GD	Pts
UP Fighting Maroons	10	9	1	0	14	2	+12	28
UST Growling Tigers	10	6	2	2	20	8	+12	20
De La Salle Green Archers	10	4	4	2	15	7	+8	16
UE Red Warriors	10	2	4	4	6	9	−3	10
FEU Tamaraws	10	1	2	7	11	21	−10	5
Ateneo Blue Eagles	10	0	3	7	2	21	−19	3

Qualified to the Finals with the twice-to-beat advantage
Qualified to the Finals

===== Match-up results =====
	Round 1					Round 2				
Team ╲ Game	1	2	3	4	5	6	7	8	9	10
Ateneo	La Salle school colors	UP school colors	FEU school colors	UST school colors	UE school colors	UP school colors	UE school colors	La Salle school colors	FEU school colors	UST school colors
La Salle	Ateneo school colors	UST school colors	UE school colors	FEU school colors	UP school colors	FEU school colors	UST school colors	Ateneo school colors	UE school colors	UP school colors
FEU	UP school colors	UE school colors	Ateneo school colors	La Salle school colors	UST school colors	La Salle school colors	UP school colors	UST school colors	Ateneo school colors	UE school colors
UE	UST school colors	FEU school colors	La Salle school colors	UP school colors	Ateneo school colors	UST school colors	Ateneo school colors	UP school colors	La Salle school colors	FEU school colors
UP	FEU school colors	Ateneo school colors	UST school colors	UE school colors	La Salle school colors	Ateneo school colors	FEU school colors	UE school colors	UST school colors	La Salle school colors
UST	UE school colors	La Salle school colors	UP school colors	Ateneo school colors	FEU school colors	UE school colors	La Salle school colors	FEU school colors	UP school colors	Ateneo school colors

= Win; = Draw; = Loss

==== Finals ====
February 27
2:00 PM

UP Fighting Maroons	2–1	UST Growling Tigers
Aryee 31'; Valmayor 51'		Clarino 60' (pen.)

Erenchun Field, Ateneo de Manila University, Quezon City

UP wins series in one game.

==== Awards ====
- Most Valuable Player: Stephen Ralph Permanes (UP Fighting Maroons)
- Rookie of the Year: Gerardo Valmayor (UP Fighting Maroons)
- Best Striker: Gerardo Valmayor (UP Fighting Maroons)
- Best Midfielder: Shinmar Felongco (UST Growling Tigers)
- Best Defender: Deo Segunial (UP Fighting Maroons)
- Best Goalkeeper: Patrick Deyto (De La Salle Green Archers)
- Fair Play Award: De La Salle Green Archers

=== Women's tournament ===
==== Elimination round ====
===== Team standings =====
Team	Pld	W	D	L	GF	GA	GD	Pts
UST Growling Tigresses	8	5	1	2	10	4	+6	16
FEU Lady Tamaraws	8	5	1	2	7	2	+5	16
De La Salle Lady Archers	8	3	2	3	3	5	−2	11
Ateneo Lady Eagles	8	1	3	4	2	7	−5	6
UP Lady Maroons	8	1	3	4	6	11	−5	6

Qualified to the Finals

===== Match-up results =====
	Round 1				Round 2			
Team ╲ Game	1	2	3	4	5	6	7	8
Ateneo	UST school colors	FEU school colors	La Salle school colors	UP school colors	La Salle school colors	UST school colors	FEU school colors	UP school colors
La Salle	UP school colors	UST school colors	Ateneo school colors	FEU school colors	Ateneo school colors	UST school colors	FEU school colors	UP school colors
FEU	UP school colors	UST school colors	Ateneo school colors	La Salle school colors	UP school colors	La Salle school colors	Ateneo school colors	UST school colors
UP	FEU school colors	La Salle school colors	UST school colors	Ateneo school colors	UST school colors	FEU school colors	La Salle school colors	Ateneo school colors
UST	Ateneo school colors	FEU school colors	La Salle school colors	UP school colors	UP school colors	La Salle school colors	Ateneo school colors	FEU school colors

= Win; = Draw; = Loss

==== Finals ====
The women's football finals series is a best-of-three series; all matches must have a winner. If a match is tied at the end of full-time, a 30-minute extra time will be played, and if still tied, five rounds of penalty shootout shall be held, and if still tied, a sudden-death penalty shootout shall be held.

February 27
9:00 AM

UST Growling Tigresses	0–0 (a.e.t.)	FEU Lady Tamaraws
Penalties
Rivilla (penalty missed); Barruga (penalty missed); Luna (penalty missed); Artillaga (penalty missed)	0–2	(penalty scored) Sabanal; (penalty scored) Omictin

Erenchun Field, Ateneo de Manila University, Quezon City
March 3
2:00 PM

UST Growling Tigresses	1–0	FEU Lady Tamaraws
Barruga 15'		(yellow card) Mercado

Erenchun Field, Ateneo de Manila University, Quezon City
March 6
2:00 PM

UST Growling Tigresses	0–1	FEU Lady Tamaraws
		Fado 16'

Erenchun Field, Ateneo de Manila University, Quezon City

FEU wins series 2–1.

==== Awards ====
- Most Valuable Player: Frea Fado (FEU Lady Tamaraws)
- Rookie of the Year: Pearl Anjanette Aguilar (UST Growling Tigresses)
- Best Striker: Marianne Narciso (UST Growling Tigresses)
- Best Midfielder: Loreta Ladero (FEU Lady Tamaraws)
- Best Defender: Mara Kristia Sabanal (FEU Lady Tamaraws)
- Best Goalkeeper: Zipporah Luna (UST Growling Tigresses)
- Fair Play Award: Ateneo Blue Eagles

== Baseball ==
The UAAP Baseball officially opened November 28, 2010. Games were played at the Rizal Memorial Baseball Stadium. With UST sweeping the elimination round, they were declared automatic champions and the playoffs were scrapped.

=== Men's tournament ===
==== Elimination round ====
===== Team standings =====
Rank	Team	W	L	GB
1st place, gold medalist(s)	UST Growling Tigers	10	0	--
2nd place, silver medalist(s)	NU Bulldogs	6	4	4
3rd place, bronze medalist(s)	Adamson Soaring Falcons	4	6	6
4	Ateneo Blue Eagles	4	6	6
5	UP Fighting Maroons	3	7	7
6	**De La Salle Green Archers**	3	7	7

Host team in boldface.

===== Match-up results =====
	Round 1					Round 2				
Team ╲ Game	1	2	3	4	5	6	7	8	9	10
Adamson	Ateneo school colors	UST school colors	La Salle school colors	UP school colors	NU school colors	Ateneo school colors	NU school colors	UP school colors	UST school colors	La Salle school colors
Ateneo	Adamson school colors	La Salle school colors	NU school colors	UST school colors	UP school colors	Adamson school colors	La Salle school colors	UST school colors	NU school colors	UP school colors
La Salle	UP school colors	Ateneo school colors	Adamson school colors	NU school colors	UST school colors	UST school colors	Ateneo school colors	NU school colors	UP school colors	Adamson school colors
NU	UST school colors	UP school colors	Ateneo school colors	La Salle school colors	Adamson school colors	UP school colors	Adamson school colors	La Salle school colors	Ateneo school colors	UST school colors
UP	La Salle school colors	NU school colors	UST school colors	Adamson school colors	Ateneo school colors	NU school colors	UST school colors	Adamson school colors	La Salle school colors	Ateneo school colors
UST	NU school colors	Adamson school colors	UP school colors	Ateneo school colors	La Salle school colors	La Salle school colors	UP school colors	Ateneo school colors	Adamson school colors	NU school colors

= Win; = Loss

== Softball ==
The UAAP Softball officially opened December 1, 2010. Games were played at the UP Softball Field. With Adamson sweeping the elimination round, they were declared automatic champions and the playoffs were scrapped.

=== Women's tournament ===
==== Elimination round ====
===== Team standings =====
Rank	Team	W	L	GB
1st place, gold medalist(s)	Adamson Lady Falcons	10	0	--
2nd place, silver medalist(s)	UE Lady Warriors	8	2	2
3rd place, bronze medalist(s)	UST Growling Tigresses	6	4	4
4	UP Lady Maroons	3	7	7
5	Ateneo Lady Eagles	2	8	8
6	**De La Salle Lady Archers**	1	9	9

Host team in boldface.

===== Match-up results =====
	Round 1					Round 2				
Team ╲ Game	1	2	3	4	5	6	7	8	9	10
Adamson	Ateneo school colors	UP school colors	La Salle school colors	UE school colors	UST school colors	La Salle school colors	Ateneo school colors	UST school colors	UP school colors	UE school colors
Ateneo	Adamson school colors	UST school colors	UP school colors	La Salle school colors	UE school colors	UE school colors	Adamson school colors	UP school colors	La Salle school colors	UST school colors
La Salle	UST school colors	UE school colors	Adamson school colors	Ateneo school colors	UP school colors	Adamson school colors	UST school colors	UE school colors	Ateneo school colors	UP school colors
UE	UP school colors	La Salle school colors	UST school colors	Adamson school colors	Ateneo school colors	Ateneo school colors	UP school colors	La Salle school colors	UST school colors	Adamson school colors
UP	UE school colors	Adamson school colors	Ateneo school colors	UST school colors	La Salle school colors	UST school colors	UE school colors	Ateneo school colors	Adamson school colors	La Salle school colors
UST	La Salle school colors	Ateneo school colors	UE school colors	UP school colors	Adamson school colors	UP school colors	La Salle school colors	Adamson school colors	UE school colors	Ateneo school colors

= Win; = Loss

== Badminton ==
=== Seniors division ===
==== Men's tournament ====
===== Elimination round =====
====== Team standings ======
Rank (Final)	Team	W	L	PCT
1st place, gold medalist(s)	UST Growling Tigers	7	0	1.000
2nd place, silver medalist(s)	Ateneo Blue Eagles	6	1	.857
4	**De La Salle Green Archers**	5	2	.714
3rd place, bronze medalist(s)	NU Bulldogs	4	3	.571
5	UP Fighting Maroons	3	4	.429
6	FEU Tamaraws	1	5	.167
7	UE Red Warriors	1	5	.167
8	Adamson Soaring Falcons	0	7	.000

Season host is boldfaced.

Qualified to the semifinals

==== Women's tournament ====
===== Elimination round =====
====== Team standings ======
Rank (Final)	Team	W	L	PCT
2nd place, silver medalist(s)	**De La Salle Lady Archers**	7	0	1.000
3rd place, bronze medalist(s)	UE Lady Warriors	6	1	.857
1st place, gold medalist(s)	FEU Lady Tamaraws	5	2	.714
4	UST Growling Tigresses	4	3	.571
5	UP Lady Maroons	3	4	.428
6	Adamson Lady Falcons	2	5	.285
7	Ateneo Lady Eagles	1	6	.167
8	NU Lady Bulldogs	0	7	.000

Season host is boldfaced.

Qualified to the semifinals

== Judo ==
The UAAP Judo Championships was held on October 9–10, 2010 at Filoil Flying V Arena in San Juan City. It was a two-day tournament.

=== Seniors division ===
==== Men's tournament ====
Rank	Team	Medals				Points
Rank	Team	1st place, gold medalist(s)	2nd place, silver medalist(s)	3rd place, bronze medalist(s)	**Total**	Points
1st place, gold medalist(s)	Ateneo	4	3	2	9	57
2nd place, silver medalist(s)	UST	3	1	2	6	39
3rd place, bronze medalist(s)	**La Salle**					24
4	UP					
5	UE					
6	Adamson					

Season host in boldface.

==== Women's tournament ====
Rank	Team	Medals				Points
Rank	Team	1st place, gold medalist(s)	2nd place, silver medalist(s)	3rd place, bronze medalist(s)	**Total**	Points
1st place, gold medalist(s)	UST	4	0	1	5	42
2nd place, silver medalist(s)	UP					35
3rd place, bronze medalist(s)	**La Salle**					
4	UE					
5	Ateneo					
6	Adamson					

Season host in boldface.

=== Juniors division ===
==== Boys' tournament ====
Rank	Team	Medals				Points
Rank	Team	1st place, gold medalist(s)	2nd place, silver medalist(s)	3rd place, bronze medalist(s)	**Total**	Points
1st place, gold medalist(s)	Ateneo					
2nd place, silver medalist(s)	UST					
3rd place, bronze medalist(s)	**La Salle**					
4	UE					
5	UP					

Season host in boldface.

== Chess ==
The UAAP Season 73 chess tournament started on January 8, 2011, Saturday, at the Far Eastern University New Tech Mini Auditorium.

=== Seniors division ===
==== Men's tournament ====
Rank	Team	Points
1st place, gold medalist(s)	FEU Tamaraws	46.5
2nd place, silver medalist(s)	UST Growling Tigers	36.5
3rd place, bronze medalist(s)	Adamson Soaring Falcons	30.0
4	UP Fighting Maroons	
5	Ateneo Blue Eagles	
6	UE Red Warriors	
7	NU Bulldogs	
8	**De La Salle Green Archers**	

Season host in boldface.

===== Awards =====
- Most Valuable Player: Sheider Nebato (FEU Tamaraws)

==== Women's tournament ====
Rank	Team	Points
1st place, gold medalist(s)	**De La Salle Lady Archers**	45.0
2nd place, silver medalist(s)	UST Growling Tigresses	
3rd place, bronze medalist(s)	FEU Lady Tamaraws	
4	UP Lady Maroons	
5	NU Lady Bulldogs	
6	Ateneo Lady Eagles	
7	UE Lady Warriors	
8	Adamson Lady Falcons	

Season host in boldface.

===== Awards =====
- Most Valuable Player: Jodilyn Fronda (De La Salle Lady Archers)

=== Juniors division ===
==== Boys' tournament ====
Rank	Team	Points
1st place, gold medalist(s)	FEU–D Baby Tamaraws	40.5
?	Adamson Baby Falcons	
?	NUNS Bullpups	
?	Ateneo Blue Eaglets	
?	UST Tiger Cubs	
?	UE Junior Red Warriors	
?	**Zobel Junior Archers**	

Season host in boldface.

===== Awards =====
- Most Valuable Player: Jerald Docena (FEU–D Baby Tamaraws)

== Swimming ==
The UAAP Season 73 Swimming Championships started on September 23 at the Trace Aquatics Centre in Los Baños, Laguna. Four titles were disputed in the swimming championships namely: the men's division, the women's division, the boys' division, and the girls' division.

Team ranking is determined by a point system, similar to that of the overall championship. The points given are based on the swimmer's/team's finish in the finals of an event, which include only the top eight finishers from the preliminaries. The gold medalist(s) receive 15 points, silver gets 12, bronze has 10. The following points: 8, 6, 4, 2 and 1 are given to the rest of the participating swimmers/teams according to their order of finish.

=== Seniors division ===
==== Men's tournament ====
Rank	Team	Medals				Points
Rank	Team	1st place, gold medalist(s)	2nd place, silver medalist(s)	3rd place, bronze medalist(s)	**Total**	Points
1st place, gold medalist(s)	UP	5	5	4	14	**201**
2nd place, silver medalist(s)	UST	3	4	5	12	**194**
3rd place, bronze medalist(s)	Ateneo	8	6	7	21	**186**
4	**La Salle**	6	7	5	18	**169**
5	UE	0	0	1	1	**21**

Host team in boldface.

==== Women's tournament ====
Rank	Team	Medals				Points
Rank	Team	1st place, gold medalist(s)	2nd place, silver medalist(s)	3rd place, bronze medalist(s)	**Total**	Points
1st place, gold medalist(s)	UP	4	7	9	20	**263**
2nd place, silver medalist(s)	Ateneo	16	7	4	27	**249**
3rd place, bronze medalist(s)	**La Salle**	1	6	7	14	**169**
4	UST	0	1	1	2	**41**
5	UE	0	0	0	0	**9**

Host team in boldface.

=== Juniors division ===
==== Boys' tournament ====
Rank	Team	Medals				Points
Rank	Team	1st place, gold medalist(s)	2nd place, silver medalist(s)	3rd place, bronze medalist(s)	**Total**	Points
1st place, gold medalist(s)	Ateneo					
2nd place, silver medalist(s)	UST					
3rd place, bronze medalist(s)	**La Salle**					
4	UE					
5	UP					

Host team in boldface.

==== Girls' tournament ====
Rank	Team	Medals				Points
Rank	Team	1st place, gold medalist(s)	2nd place, silver medalist(s)	3rd place, bronze medalist(s)	**Total**	Points
1st place, gold medalist(s)	UST					
2nd place, silver medalist(s)	UE					
3rd place, bronze medalist(s)	**DLSZ**					
4	UPIS					

Host team in boldface.

== Exhibition events ==
=== Cheerdance ===
The UAAP Cheerdance Competition was held on September 12, 2010 at the Araneta Coliseum in Quezon City. The event was covered live by Studio 23 and was hosted by Boom Gonzalez and the various UAAP courtside reporters. Cheer dance competition is an exhibition event. Points for the general championship are not awarded to the participants.

Rank	Order	Pep squad	Score	Percentage
1st place, gold medalist(s)	6th	UP Pep Squad	440.9	88.18
2nd place, silver medalist(s)	5th	FEU Cheering Squad	421.4	84.28
3rd place, bronze medalist(s)	2nd	UST Salinggawi Dance Troupe	407.5	81.50
4	4th	Ateneo Blue Babble Battalion	393.2	78.64
5	3rd	**DLSU Animo Squad**	375.3	75.06
6	1st	UE Pep Squad	361.0	72.20
7	8th	NU Pep Squad	357.9	71.58
8	7th	Adamson Pep Squad	354.6	70.92

Host team in boldface. "Order" refers to order of performance.

- Stunner awardee: Nikka de Dios (La Salle)

=== Street dance ===
The 1st UAAP Street Dance Competition will be held on March 12, 2011 at the Araneta Coliseum in Quezon City. The event will coincide with the awarding ceremony for this season's UAAP. Street dance competition is an exhibition event. Points for the general championship are not awarded to the participants.

Rank	Order	Team	Score
1st place, gold medalist(s)	6th	**La Salle Dance Company – Street**	91.00
2nd place, silver medalist(s)	1st	UP Street Dance Club	88.30
3rd place, bronze medalist(s)	2nd	Company of Ateneo Dancers	86.70
4	8th	UE Silanganan Dance Troupe	83.67
5	7th	UST Salinggawi Dance Troupe	76.83
6	4th	FEU Cheering Squad	72.17
7	3rd	Company of Adamson Street Dance	70.83
8	5th	NU Dance Crew	64.75

Host team in boldface. "Order" refers to order of performance.

== General championship summary ==
The general champion is determined by a point system. The system gives 15 points to the champion team of a UAAP event, 12 to the runner-up, and 10 to the third placer. The following points: 8, 6, 4, 2 and 1 are given to the rest of the participating teams according to their order of finish.

=== Medals table ===
==== Seniors' division ====
Rank	Team	Gold	Silver	Bronze	Total
1	University of Santo Tomas	7	10	5	22
2	Far Eastern University	7	4	3	14
3	De La Salle University*	4	6	6	16
4	University of the Philippines Diliman	4	1	3	8
5	Adamson University	3	0	5	8
6	Ateneo de Manila University	2	4	3	9
7	University of the East	1	2	2	5
8	National University	0	1	1	2
Totals (8 entries)		**28**	**28**	**28**	**84**

* Host nation (Season host); General champions
Notes: Results are final.

==== Juniors' division ====
Rank	Team	Gold	Silver	Bronze	Total
1	Ateneo de Manila University	3	3	0	6
1	University of the East	3	3	0	6
3	University of Santo Tomas	2	4	3	9
4	Far Eastern University–FERN College	2	0	1	3
5	De La Salle Zobel*	1	0	5	6
6	UP Integrated School	1	0	1	2
7	National University	0	1	2	3
8	Adamson University	0	1	0	1
Totals (8 entries)		**12**	**12**	**12**	**36**

* Host nation (Season host); General champions
Notes: Results are final.

=== General championship tally ===
==== Seniors' division ====
		Basketball		Volleyball (indoor)		Volleyball (beach)		Swimming		Chess		Tennis		Table tennis		Badminton		Taekwondo		Judo		Baseball	Softball	Football		Athletics		Fencing		Total		
Rank	Team	M	W	M	W	M	W	M	W	M	W	M	W	M	W	M	W	M	W	M	W	M	W	M	W	M	W	M	W	M	W	Overall
1	UST	2	10	15	12	12	8	12	8	12	12	15	8	15	10	15	8	12	15	12	15	15	10	12	12	10	12	10	4	169	144	313
2	La Salle **(H)**	8	8	8	15	6	12	8	10	1	15	12	15	12	12	8	12	15	10	10	10	4	4	10	10	6	6	4	12	112	151	263
3	UP	1	4	10	2	8	2	15	15	8	8	8	10	8	8	6	6	10	8	8	12	6	8	15	6	4	4	15	6	122	99	221
4	FEU	12	12	12	4	15	10	—	—	15	10	—	—	10	15	2	15	8	12	—	—	—	—	6	15	15	15	8	8	103	116	219
5	Ateneo	15	2	4	8	2	4	10	12	6	4	10	12	2	6	12	2	6	4	15	6	8	6	4	8	8	8	12	10	114	92	206
6	UE	4	1	1	1	4	6	6	6	4	2	6	—	6	—	4	10	4	6	6	8	—	12	8	—	12	10	6	15	71	77	148
7	Adamson	10	15	6	10	10	15	—	—	10	1	—	—	—	—	1	4	—	—	4	4	10	15	—	—	—	—	—	—	51	64	115
8	NU	6	6	2	6	1	1	—	—	2	6	—	—	4	4	10	1	—	—	—	—	12	—	—	—	—	—	—	—	37	24	61

(H) Season host; = Champion; = Runner-up; = Third place; — = No team.
Notes: Results are final.

==== Juniors' division ====
		Basketball	Volleyball (indoor)		Swimming		Chess	Table tennis	Taekwondo	Judo	Football	Athletics	Fencing	Total				
Rank	Team	B	B	G	B	G	C	B	B	B	B	B	B	B	G	C	K	Overall
1	UST	12	12	8	12	15	4	10	15	12	8	10	10	101	23	4	0	128
2	UE	2	15	12	8	12	6	15	12	8	—	8	15	83	24	6	0	113
3	Ateneo	15	6	—	15	—	8	6	8	15	12	12	12	101	0	8	0	109
4	DLSZ **(H)**	10	8	15	10	10	2	2	6	10	10	6	—	62	25	2	0	89
5	UPIS	1	4	10	6	8	—	4	—	6	—	15	8	44	18	0	0	62
6	FEU–FERN	6	—	—	—	—	15	—	10	—	15	—	—	31	0	15	0	46
7	NU	8	10	—	—	—	10	12	—	—	—	—	—	30	0	10	0	40
8	Adamson	4	—	—	—	—	12	8	—	—	—	4	—	16	0	12	0	28

(H) Season host; = Champion; = Runner-up; = Third place; — = No team.
Notes: Results are final.

== Individual awards ==
- Athlete of the Year:
  - Seniors: Maria Camille Manalo (UST Growling Tigresses)
  - Juniors: Sabrina Ingrid Illustra (UE Junior Lady Warriors)

== See also ==
- NCAA Season 86
