= FEU Tamaraws basketball =

FEU Tamaraws
2026 FEU Tamaraws basketball team
- University: Far Eastern University
- Founded: Early 20th century
- History: FEU Tamaraws (1930s–present)
- Head coach: Sean Chambers (3rd season)
- Location: Pasong Tamo, Diliman, Quezon City
- Nickname: Tamaraws
- Colors: Green and Gold

UAAP Champion (20)
- 1938; 1939; 1947; 1950; 1956; 1961; 1972; 1973; 1976; 1979; 1980; 1981; 1983; 1991; 1992; 1997; 2003; 2004; 2005; 2015

PCCL Champion (3)
- 2004; 2005; 2015

FEU Tamaraws are the collegiate basketball varsity team of the Far Eastern University (FEU). FEU currently holds the record of winning the most number of championships (20 championships) in the men's basketball division of the University Athletic Association of the Philippines. FEU also appeared in the Philippine Collegiate Championship finals four times, and was able to win back to back championships in 2004 and 2005. The team originally played in the NCAA from 1929 to 1936 and was one of its founding members.

While the main campus of FEU is in Sampaloc, Manila, the basketball team is now based in FEU Diliman in Diliman, Quezon City.

== History ==
=== Williams, Capacio and the 1980s ===
1981 MVP Anthony Williams led the Tams to its first three-peat, from 1979 to 1981, including a back to back 12-0 eliminations sweep in 1980 and 1981. The unbeaten Tamaraws played the rival UE Warriors in the 1981 UAAP Finals. UE rookie Allan Caidic, missed two free throws and FEU captured their third straight title and the most coveted three-peat to give the Tams its 12th overall title. FEU did not make it to the finals in 1982, but the team was able to come back in 1983, led by season MVP Glenn Capacio to their fourth title in five years. Johnny Abarrientos joined the seniors team two years after leading the Baby Tamaraws to its juniors' basketball title. Victor Pablo along with Abarrientos led the Tams back to the finals after six years, matching with the DLSU Archers, a team who just joined the league couple of years back out of NCAA. The Archers were victorious, with Eddie Viaplana's three pointer with sixteen seconds remaining sealed the Archers' first UAAP title with the score of 74–69.

=== Magtulis, Oliver, Manabat and Mendoza late 1990s ===
FEU won championships in the early 1990s led by Abarrientos and Pablo. Saw the triumvirate of Ronald Magtulis, Michael Oliver and Anastacio Mendoza in 94 and 95 though they did not won the championship but they were in the final 4. The last championship in the late 1990s came in 1997 with the trio of Magtulis, Oliver and Mendoza, defensive stopper Manabat and three-point assassin Edwin Bacani against the Maui Roca-led Green Archers.

=== Arwind Santos era ===
Arwind Santos started his UAAP career in 2002 alongside future PBA standouts Mark Isip and Dennis Miranda. The Tamaraws failed to make it to the Final Four that year after losing to the Cyrus Baguio-led UST for the last Final Four slot, though Santos won season's Rookie of the Year award. In Season 66, it was a quick turn around for the Tamaraws, who had their core intact with key players Rhagnee Sinco, Gerald Jones, Cesar Catli, the emergence of Arwind Santos and James Zablan returning from injury, FEU dominated the eliminations and gained the top two seed. The Tamaraws defeated the James Yap-led UE Red Warriors in the final four. They garnered their first title in six seasons with a sweep against the Ateneo Blue Eagles via two lopsided games. Santos won the season MVP for the first time in his college career on his third year with the Tamaraws, and was selected to the mythical team together with Miranda. That same year, the team tried to defend its title, but the Tamaraws lost to the Archers in a three-game series despite leading by a point in the final seconds when Green Archer sharpshooter JVee Casio nailed a three-pointer with two seconds left. Without any remaining timeouts for both teams, Jeff Chan was forced to do a Hail Mary shot from the half court and hit only the front rim as time expires.

With Miranda's departure in 2005, rookie point guard Jonas Villanueva filled in for his role. Santos came back for his final year despite issues that he would be entering the PBA draft. With the core of Santos, big man Mark Isip, RJ Rizada, Villanueva and Chan, FEU, once again, were picked by analysts as title favorites prior to the season. The Tamaraws swept the first round eliminations and won twelve of their fourteen outings overall to claim the number one spot in the Final Four. FEU breezed past the UE Red Warriors via blowout and advanced to the Finals for three straight years where they faced their long time rivals, De La Salle Green Archers, once again in the championship. In game one, FEU, trailed most of the game but key reserve Elder Saldua led the charge in the first three quarters to keep the Tamaraws close enough for a comeback. Arwind Santos, made some key plays including five straight points in the final forty-nine seconds to complete a 75–73 comeback win in game one. When the final buzzer sounded, Controversy surrounded Santos and Green Archers assistant manager Manny Salgado when the latter struck the former after having some words with Green Archer forward Joseph Yeo that bought heat between the two players because of an in tensed classic game. After an investigation, Salgado was banned by the UAAP for life despite issuing a public apology. Another classic game occurred in game two but the Tamaraws held on when the Archers tried to take the lead and extend the series. Villanueva sealed the championship for FEU after making a crucial free throw with a few seconds left and Isip blocked a Junjun Cabatu desperate three-pointer and the Tamaraws won its 18th title overall after a sweep against the DLSU Archers, 73–71. Later that year, with the controversies surrounding the Archers, the UAAP decided to award the title to the Tamaraws after De La Salle University admitted that they have ineligible players from UAAP Season 67 in which they won the championship. Thus, it gave FEU the three-peat from 2003 to 2005.

The Santos-led Tamaraws also won back-to-back championships in the PCCL during 2004 and 2005 beating the UE Red Warriors and San Sebastian Stags respectively, making them the best collegiate team in the Philippines.

=== Post-Santos era, roster overhaul ===
With Santos, Isip and Rizada departing due to graduation, the Tamaraws were expected to defend their championship with Chan and Villanueva returning for their final playing year. Rookie Mac Baracael was also expected to fill Santos' shoes for the team. With DLSU suspended for the whole Season 69, every team will only play 12 games. The defending champions had a slow start losing their first four games but managed to win four straight. But FEU finished the season winning only a single game in their final four games and failed to enter the Final Four.

Due to the team's dismal performance in Season 69, FEU has planned to bring the Baby Tamaraws core of Socrates Rivera, Mark Lopez, Aldrech Ramos and Ian Sanggalang to represent the men's basketball team for Season 70 but Rivera and Lopez decided to play for the UP Fighting Maroons and Sanggalang went to San Sebastian-Recoletos. This prompted the school to elevate most of its players from Team B along with Ramos and Baby Tamaraws key holdovers JR Cawaling and Jens Knuttel. Mac Baracael, JR Guerilla and Benedict Fernandez are the only players left from last year's team. Lead assistant Glenn Capacio took over the reins from Bert Flores in the off-season. The Tamaraws had a rough start in the first round but managed to win four games in seven outings. In the middle of the season, Guerilla was caught selling his game that lead to his dismissal from the team. They forced a playoff for the 4th Final Four spot against UST but lost and for the second straight year, FEU failed to qualify in the Final Four and JR Cawaling was named the Rookie of the Year.

In Season 71, FEU emerged as a "dark horse" team in the tournament. With point guard Mark Barroca's emergence, the team had a 2–1 start until Mac Baracael was shot by an unknown by-stander outside the campus. Rumors swirl that Baracael denied to "sell his game" as the reason why the incident happened. Even with Baracael out, FEU continued their run. Thanks to Barroca, Benedict Fernandez, big man Reil Cervantes and Aldrech Ramos' improved play, the team was recognized as a title contender for the season. Baracael returned after 5 games and the Tamaraws finished 3rd in the standings with a 10–4 record. The Tamaraws returned and faced the DLSU Green Archers in the Final Four with a twice-to-beat disadvantage but failed to force a do-or-die game.

FEU hosted Season 72 and the plan was the team to capture the title. With Mac Baracael and Benedict Fernandez graduating, the Tamaraws recruited scorer RR Garcia to boost its back court rotation. The Tamaraws emerged as champions during the Pre-Season tournament sponsored by Fil-Oil Flying V with Garcia taking home the MVP trophy. FEU finished with an 11–3 record only losing their games to UE and Ateneo including the battle for the number 1 seed. Entering the Final Four, Mark Barroca was suddenly removed from the team's roster. It was unclear what was the reason for Barroca's departure but reports said that the playmaker was involved in game-fixing issues in which he denied. The Barroca-less Tamaraws played the Paul Lee-led UE Red Warriors as the number two seed but was defeated twice and finished in 3rd place in the tournament once again.

=== Terrence Romeo era, championship pursuits ===
FEU recruited Baby Tamaraws superstar Terrence Romeo and gave the Tamaraws a solid back court that helped the team earn a trip to the finals. FEU defeated DLSU, 69–59 in overtime to enter the Finals. Ateneo and FEU met in the championship, which rekindled its match up dating back in 2003. Ateneo won that time, including a 72-49 blow out during the first game, and a hard-fought second game with Ryan Buenafe's three pointer late in the fourth quarter ended FEU's title hopes. RR Garcia was named the Season MVP and Romeo took home the Rookie of the Year honors.

In Season 74, The Tamaraws hired former coach Bert Flores after Glenn Capacio called it quits. They also recruited former Baby Tamaraws and RP Youth players Mike Tolomia and athletic big man Russel Escoto. FEU finished third and a final four slot with a 9–5 record. They were matched with Adamson, their first post season match up since the final four era started. Though Adamson carries a twice to beat advantage, FEU's post season experience put them back to the finals against the Ateneo Blue Eagles, their third finals match up in eight years. Ateneo would sweep the series, giving them their fourth straight title.

Cervantes decided not to come back in Season 75 which resulted as a lost season for the Tamaraws. Despite winning their first four games, FEU did not make it to the Final Four. It was a string of losses for the Tams as they lost three straight games to end their season; the first being with the Archers when they are guaranteed to have a twice to beat advantage with a win. The second was against the Bulldogs' 84–81 victory in overtime after a controversial 77–75 win was ordered to be re-played by the UAAP Boards because of the "inconclusive and unclear" video evidence of RR Garcia's buzzer beating layup. Another loss came from the hands of the Archers, when they battled for a fourth-seed playoffs. The Tams led as many as ten points in the fourth quarter with six minutes to go but came up short to earn a final spot in the Final Four.

In Season 76, FEU made a major revamp with their roster and coaching personnel. The Tamaraws hired former San Beda Red Lions coach Nash Racela and assigned former mentor Bert Flores as the team's consultant. FEU great Johnny Abarrientos was retained as assistant coach while former UST King Tiger Gilbert Lao and Josh Reyes were added as Racela's deputies. The team dropped Arvie Bringas and added Josh Aguilon, Christian Lee Yu and Jason Delfinado who were key players from last season's Juniors Champions FEU-FERN Baby Tamaraws. The team has planned to build the team around Jerie Pingoy but the Juniors MVP, who led the Baby Tamaraws to the championship decided to go to Ateneo and served the then-2-year residency rule. FEU lost Russel Escoto to a knee injury occurred during their game in the PBA D-League. The Tamaraws swept the first round but struggled in the second round. The Tamaraws managed to finish with a 10–4 record and they qualified in the Final Four where they faced the DLSU Green Archers as the third seed but lost to them again for the battle for the number two seed. Terrence Romeo was named the Season 76 Most Valuable Player. In their Final Four showdown against the Green Archers, the Tamaraws led most of the game. However, they couldn't stop a furious fourth quarter rally from DLSU and they were eliminated with a score of 71–68. FEU finished third overall in the tournament. Romeo surprised the Tams as he declared that he will join the rookie draft despite promising to return to FEU after bowing out of the Final Four.

=== Back to championship form and defending the crown ===
The Tamaraws were expected to struggle in Season 77 with the exit of Romeo and Russel Escoto missing the remainder of the season due to injury but they managed to adjust during the off-season. With Romeo gone, role players like Tolomia, Mac Belo, team captain Carl Bryan Cruz and RR Pogoy got the opportunity to step up to fill the void left by Garcia and Romeo when it comes to scoring. It seemed to be the team had a good chemistry and the results were unexpected and surprised the basketball analysts. Achie Inigo and Francis Tamsi also stepped up. FEU managed to win 10 games in 14 outings and settled for a second-place finish and faced the De La Salle Green Archers in the Final Four. La Salle forced a do-or-die semifinal when they defeated the Tamaraws 94–73 in the first game but in Game 2 winner-take-all match, Mac Belo drained a three-pointer as the buzzer expired and the Tamaraws advanced to the Finals, 67–64. FEU faced the National University Bulldogs for the championship. Russel Escoto returned but had limited minutes. They managed to win Game 1, 75-70 but Alfred Aroga, Troy Rosario and Gelo Alolino were too much to handle and they succumbed Games 2 (62-47) and 3 (75-59) for the Bulldogs to win the championship. Mac Belo was included in the Mythical Team. It was FEU's third 1st runner-up finishes in 4 years.

Before the start of Season 78, the Tamaraws were picked by the analysts to win the championship because of their intact line up and experience with only Carl Cruz being subtracted from the roster and the team showing good chemistry during the pre-season tournament. New additions Monbert Arong will provide scoring and defense off the bench while big man Prince Orizu who plays center, gives FEU a complete lineup that can match some of the schools who have big imports. FEU lacked size in Season 77 acted as the main reason they lost in the finals with NU's Alfred Aroga dominating the paint. With Tolomia, Belo, Escoto, Pogoy, Inigo, and Tamsi playing their last year for the team, the Tamaraws started strong and were very consistent up until the end of the eliminations losing only to the league-leading UST Growling Tigers twice and defending champion NU Bulldogs. FEU also had a big game in their last match of the eliminations and let their bench players play all throughout but still managed to defeat the De La Salle Green Archers that kissed their Final Four hopes goodbye. They finished 11-3 along with league-leader UST and placed second in the standings due to quotient rules. FEU faced the Ateneo Blue Eagles in the Final Four and knocked them out in the first game via another Mac Belo put-in buzzer. The Tamaraws met the UST Growling Tigers in the Finals. FEU won the first game via 75-64 blowout. On Game 2, UST tied the series via Kevin Ferrer's 28-point performance in the third quarter that led to a 62–56 win. Come the do-or-die game, the Tamaraws went on a late run in the last two minutes and route to a 67-62 come-from-behind win to claim the title that they last achieved in UAAP Season 68. Mac Belo was named UAAP Finals MVP and it was coach Nash Racela's first title ever since he took over the reins in Season 76.

The Tamaraws reclaimed the crown in the then-PCCL National Collegiate Championship after they beat the CESAFI Champions University of San Carlos in the semi-finals. Due to scheduling conflicts, they were crowned co-champions with the NCAA Season 91 1st runner-up San Beda Red Lions.

With Tolomia, Tamsi, Achie Inigo, Pogoy graduating, the Tamaraws lost most of their core players that helped the team bring the title back to Morayta. Before the season started, the UAAP Board were planning to approve the age limit of 24 years for the players to be eligible to play in the league and decided to dump the "seven-year window" thus making key players Mac Belo and Russel Escoto possible on returning to play for one more year. Coach Nash Racela and Athletic Director Mark Molina was open to the idea of their return but stated it is "up to them and we will welcome them in open arms" if they wanted to play for their alma mater for one more year. Both Escoto and Belo are candidates being eyed to the Gilas National Pool. However the board backed out of the plan since it created "issues" with other schools and programs. Belo and Escoto decided not to return and focused on the upcoming 2016 PBA Draft.

However, FEU won big in the off-season by acquiring the services of former Ateneo Blue Eagles prized players, Season 77 Rookie of the Year Arvin Tolentino and 2014 Juniors Finals MVP Hubert Cani. Both players were temporarily cut from Ateneo because of not meeting the school's grade standards but rumors sparkled that both complained of lack of playing time and both decided to move on from Katipunan to Morayta. Tolentino and Cani are serving a one-year residency and will be able to play in Season 80. Currently, they are assigned to FEU Team B and has been playing in commercial leagues.

The Tamaraws faced a great challenge in Season 79. Some analysts and even from the FEU camp itself, have doubts that the Tamaraws would have a hard time defending their crown since most of the core players have graduated and half of the team being newcomers. However, FEU has proven that they are still title contenders. After only winning two games in their first four outings, they finished the first round with a three-game winning streak to snatch the solo second slot in the standings with five wins against two defeats. On October 19, 2016, it was reported that head coach Nash Racela was tasked to handle TNT KaTropa in the PBA. Thus, he will be stepping down after Season 79 as UAAP coaches are not allowed to handle a professional team and a collegiate club at the same time although he will remain as a team's consultant. The Tamaraws struggled in the second round but finished with nine wins against five defeats to claim the third spot in the Final Four. They faced a twice-to-beat disadvantage against Ateneo and even forced a do-or-die match but Ron Dennison's shot was a half second late to win the match in Game 2.

On December 20, 2016, the FEU Tamaraws has announced that Nash's brother, Olsen Racela will be the new head coach of the team.

=== Championship pursuits, present ===
Olsen Racela took over the reins over his brother, Nash starting Season 80. With veterans Raymar Jose and Monbert Arong graduating, prized recruits Arvin Tolentino and Hubert Cani became eligible to fill their role. Despite also losing the Holmqvist brothers, who opted to return home in New Zealand, the Tamaraws remained contenders with new cagers Alec Stockton, Jasper Parker and RJ Ramirez bolstering their back court. Veterans Wendel Comboy, Barkley Ebona, Axel Inigo and captain Ron Dennison stepped up and FEU managed to qualify with a 7–7 record, enough to be included in the Final Four. They gave the eventual champions Ateneo Blue Eagles a scare and forced a do-or-die game but bruiser Isaac Go provided clutch shots to escape the Tamaraws in an overtime thriller.

In Season 81, FEU managed to keep their core intact with the exception of RJ Ramirez and Richard Escoto. Ken Tuffin was named the new captain of the team. The Tamaraws were able to win eight outings and set up a do or die matchup against the De La Salle Green Archers for the final slot in the Final Four. The Archers looked to oust the Tamaraws holding a four-point lead in the final two minutes but FEU got the best of the cagers from Taft. Thanks to the heroics of Arvin Tolentino, who nailed the game winning three pointer with 3.1 seconds remaining and the double double performance of Barkley Ebona. FEU escaped with a 71–70 victory and eliminated La Salle in the playoff picture. However, Ateneo proved too much for the Tamaraws in the Final Four, 80-61 and failed to force a do-or-die game.

For Season 82, the goal is the same for coach Olsen and the boys, qualify in the Final Four and win a championship. Veteran Wendel Comboy graduated and with new recruits Patrick Tchuente and former baby Tams Ljay Gonzales as their new on-court general, FEU kept up with the other contenders in the UAAP. With UP's emergence as a championship pursuing squad and Ateneo, who swept the elimination round, as the powerhouse of the league, the Tamaraws managed to finish in third place and qualify in the Final Four step ladder format. However, despite finishing ahead of UST, the Tamaraws did not gain a twice-to-beat advantage, in which the Tigers used as their trump card and defeated FEU in their match up, 81–71.

Due to the COVID-19 pandemic, Season 83 of the UAAP was cancelled. Alec Stockton and Ken Tuffin, whose eligibility were extended due to the situation, decided to leave the team to try their luck in the pros. At the present time, there were plans that the league will open the season in April 2021.

== Rivalries ==
UE Red Warriors

Crosstown rivals UE and FEU, aside from being at the same metro area, have the most number of championships, with FEU winning 20 while UE has 18 to tie it with UST. The last postseason meeting between the two took place at the Araneta Coliseum on September 24, 2009, as UE drove their way to the finals via upset with the score of 78–72.

DLSU Green Archers

Since 1994, these two teams have met in the postseason nine times, which five of them were in the finals with FEU leading the series three games to two after the 2004 DLSU title being given to FEU, to learn that two of DLSU players were ineligible to play. Another DLSU title was handed to FEU in 1991 when a player who got disqualified in the game was seen on the court for six seconds which resulted to a protest. DLSU did not show up to a replay ordered by the UAAP Boards and was later awarded FEU the trophy.

== Season-by-season records ==
	Champion
	Runner-up
	Third-place
DNQ	Did not qualify
*	Trophy was given to FEU

Year	GP	W	L	PCT	Results
Alfredo Amador (1992-1996)
1992	14	11	3	.786	Won over La Salle in a play-off, 101–87; Won over Adamson in the Finals, 2–0
1993	14	8	6	.571	UST was awarded as champions after a 14–0 sweep during eliminations
1994	12	7	5	.583	Lost to La Salle in the semifinals 63-65
1995	14	9	5	.643	Lost to UST in the semifinals 765 –65, 68-74
1996	14	4	10	.286	DNQ
1992-96	68	39	29	.573	
Danny Gavieres (1997-1999)
1997	14	11	3	.786	Won over UP in the semifinals 69–70, 70–69; Won over La Salle in the Finals 2–0
1998	14	11	3	.786	Won over UE in the semifinals 68–81, 83–61; lost to La Salle in the Finals 0–2
1999	14	9	5	.643	Lost to La Salle in the semifinals 69-91
1997-99	42	31	11	.738	
Koy Banal (2000-2004)
2000	14	9	5	.643	Won over Ateneo in the semifinals 61–60, 75–67; lost to La Salle in the Finals 0–2
2001	14	8	6	.571	Lost to Ateneo in the semifinals 63-67
2002	14	6	8	.429	DNQ
2003	14	11	3	.786	Won over UE in the semifinals 67–63; Won over Ateneo in the Finals 2–0
2004	14	11	3	.786	Won over UE in the semifinals 71–64; lost to La Salle in the Finals 1-2*
2000-04	70	45	25	.643	
Bert Flores (2005-2006)
2005	14	12	2	.857	Won over UE in the semifinals 78–57; Won over La Salle in the Finals 2–0
2006	12	5	7	.417	DNQ
2005-06	26	17	9	.653	
Glenn Capacio (2007-2010)
2007	14	8	6	.571	Lost to UST in the 4th-seed playoff 69-80
2008	14	10	4	.714	Lost to La Salle in the semifinals 62-67
2009	14	11	3	.786	Lost to UE in the semifinals 74–84, 72-78
2010	14	12	2	.857	Won over La Salle in the semifinals 69–59(OT); lost to Ateneo in the Finals 0–2
2007-10	56	41	15	.732	
Bert Flores (2011-2012)
2011	14	9	5	.643	Won over Adamson in the semifinals 59–49, 78–74; lost to Ateneo in the Finals 0–2
2012	14	9	5	.643	Lost to La Salle in the 4th-seed playoff 66-69
2011-12	54	35	19	.648	
Nash Racela (2012–2016)
2013	14	10	4	.714	Lost to La Salle in the semifinals 68-71
2014	14	10	4	.714	Won over La Salle in the semifinals, 73–94, 67–64; Lost to NU in the Finals, 1–2
2015	14	11	3	.786	Won over Ateneo in the semifinals, 76–74; Won over UST in the Finals, 2–1
2016	14	9	5	.643	Lost to Ateneo in the semifinals 62–61, 68-69(OT)
2013-16	56	40	16	.714	
Olsen Racela (2016–2022)
2017	14	7	7	.500	Lost to Ateneo in the semifinals 80–67, 84-88 (OT)
2018	14	8	6	.571	Won over La Salle in the 4th-seed playoff, 71–70. Lost to Ateneo in the semifinals, 61-80
2019	14	8	6	.571	Lost to UST in the first round, 71–81
2020	—	—	—	—	Cancelled due to the COVID-19 pandemic
2021	14	7	7	.500	Lost to Ateneo in the semifinals 72–85
2022	14	5	9	.358	DNQ
2017-22	70	35	35	.500	
Denok Miranda (2023–2024)
2023	14	3	11	.214	DNQ
Sean Chambers (2024–)
2024	14	5	9	.357	DNQ
2025	14	7	7	.500	DNQ
Eliminations	430	269	161	.626	22 Final Four appearances
Postseason	64	31	33	.484	11 Finals appearances
Total	480	297	183	.618	6 Championships

== Retired numbers ==
FEU Tamaraws retired numbers
N°	Player	Position	Tenure
19	Arwind Santos	F	2002–2005
14	Johnny Abarrientos	G	1989–1992

== Team accomplishments ==
UAAP Championships
1938, 1939, 1947, 1950, 1956, 1961, 1972, 1973, 1976, 1979, 1980, 1981, 1983, 1988, 1991, 1992, 1997, 2003, 2004, 2005, 2015
UAAP Final Four appearances
1994, 1995, 1997, 1998, 1999, 2000, 2001, 2003, 2004, 2005, 2008, 2009, 2010, 2011, 2013, 2014, 2015, 2016, 2017, 2018, 2019, 2021
PCCL Championships
2004, 2005, 2015

=== Claimed UAAP titles ===
The Tams appeared 11 times in the finals

== Current roster ==
FEU Tamaraws roster
Players
Coaches

Pos.	No.	Nat.	Name	Height	Year	High School
G	3	(Philippines)	Jorick Kyle Bautista (C)	5'11" (1.8m)	5th	Far Eastern University-Diliman
G/F	4	(Philippines)	Aicen Macapagal	6'5" (1.96m)	2nd	Far Eastern University-Diliman
G	5	(Philippines)	Jedrick Dennis Daa	6'2" (1.88m)	3rd	Far Eastern University-Diliman
F	6	(Philippines)	Wilhalm Lawrence Cabonilas	6'5" (1.96m)	1st	Far Eastern University-Diliman
G	9	(Philippines)	Kier Paolo Galvez	5'11" (1.8m)	2nd	St. Jerome School of Novaliches
G/F	10	(Philippines)	Rojan Montemayor	6'3" (1.91m)	5th	University of Santo Tomas
G	13	(Philippines)	Janrey Pasaol	5'11" (1.8m)	4th	Far Eastern University-Diliman
G	18	(United States)	Elias Gish	6'6" (1.98m)	1st	Monterey High School
G	21	(Japan)	Adam Nakai	6'3" (1.91m)	3rd	Santa Teresa High School
F	25	(Philippines)	Mark Burgos	6'5" (1.96m)	1st	Gerona Junior College
G	27	(Philippines)	Yosef Rañeses	6'0" (1.83m)	1st	Hope Christian High School
G/F	31	(Philippines)	Kirby Mongcopa	6'4" (1.93m)	2nd	Far Eastern University-Diliman
C	33	(Senegal)	Montell Anthony Shelton	6'9" (2.06m)	1st	North Harbour High School
C	35	(The Gambia)	Mohamed Konateh	6'10" (2.08m)	4th	Senegal
F	41	(Philippines)	Sam Hall	5'11" (1.8m)	1st	Far Eastern University-Diliman
G/F	72	(Philippines)	Luke Felipe	6'4" (1.93m)	2nd	Far Eastern University-Diliman
G/F	77	(Philippines)	Stephen Cabigting	6'1" (1.85m)	1st	Desert Oasis High School

Head coach

- (United States) Sean Chambers

Assistant coach(es)

- (Philippines) Richie Ticzon (Lead Assistant Coach)
- (Philippines) Gabby Severino
- (Philippines) Bert Flores
- (Philippines) Mike Reyes
- (Philippines) Johnny Abarrientos
- (Philippines) Mac Belo
- (Philippines) Cholo Añonuevo
- (Philippines) Nicolo Pili
- (Philippines) MJ Guardino
- (Philippines) Jeff Chan
- (Philippines) Mark Isip
- (Philippines) Arwind Santos

Team manager

- (Philippines) Antonio R. Montinola

Legend

- (C) Team captain
- Injured

== Awards and honors ==
Rookie of the Year

- Mark Victoria - 1996
- Leo Avenido - 1999
- Arwind Santos - 2002
- JR Cawaling - 2007
- Terrence Romeo - 2010
- Veejay Pre - 2024

Most Valuable Player

- Joselino Roa - 1961
- Anthony Williams - 1981
- Glenn Capacio - 1983
- Johnny Abarrientos - 1991
- Arwind Santos - 2004, 2005
- RR Garcia - 2010
- Terrence Romeo - 2013
- Janrey Pasaol - 2025

Finals MVP

- Romy Diaz - 1961
- Nestor Echano - 1988, 1992
- Arwind Santos - 2003, 2005
- Mac Belo - 2015

Defensive Player of the Year

- Arwind Santos - 2004, 2005

Sportsmanship Award

- Jeff Chan - 2006

Mythical team members

- Francisco Santos - 1954
- David Ligeralde - 1954
- Bayani Amador - 1954
- Victor Pablo - 1989, 1991
- Andy de Guzman - 1989
- Johnny Abarrientos - 1991
- Celino Cruz - 1999
- Leo Avenido - 2001
- Dennis Miranda - 2004
- Arwind Santos - 2003, 2004, 2005
- Mark Isip - 2005
- Jeff Chan - 2006
- RR Garcia - 2010
- Aldrech Ramos - 2009, 2010, 2011
- Terrence Romeo - 2012, 2013
- Mac Belo - 2014
- Raymar Jose - 2016
- LJ Gonzales - 2023
- Mo Konateh - 2024
- Janrey Pasaol - 2025

Mythical Second Team members

- Antonio Relosa - 1954
- Celino Cruz - 2001

Retired numbers

- 14
- 19

PBA 25th Anniversary All-Time Team

- Johnny Abarrientos

== International competitions ==
FEU Tamaraws in international competitions
Player	Country	Year	Competition	Location	Placement
Manolet Araneta	(Philippines)	1948	1948 Olympics	London	12th
Bayani Amador	(Philippines)	1954	1954 Asian Games	Manila	Gold
Bayani Amador	(Philippines)	1954	1954 World Championship	Rio de Janeiro	Bronze
Joselino Roa	(Philippines)	1962	1962 Asian Games	Jakarta	Gold
Glenn Capacio	(Philippines)	1987	1987 Southeast Asian Games	Jakarta	Gold
Johnny Abarrientos	(Philippines)	1998	1998 Asian Games	Bangkok	Bronze
Arwind Santos	(Philippines)	2009	2009 FIBA Asia Championship	Tianjin	8th
Mark Barroca	(Philippines)	2011	2011 FIBA Asia Championship	Wuhan	4th
RR Garcia	(Philippines)	2011	2011 Southeast Asian Games	Jakarta	Gold
Jeffrei Chan	(Philippines)	2012	2012 FIBA Asia Cup	Tokyo	4th
Jeffrei Chan	(Philippines)	2012	2012 William Jones Cup	Taiwan	Gold
Jeffrei Chan	(Philippines)	2013	2013 FIBA Asia Championship	Manila	Silver
Jeffrei Chan	(Philippines)	2014	2014 FIBA World Cup	Spain	21st
Mac Belo	(Philippines)	2013	2013 Southeast Asian Games	Naypyidaw	Gold
Mac Belo	(Philippines)	2015	2015 Southeast Asian Games	Singapore	Gold
Terrence Romeo	(Philippines)	2015	2015 William Jones Cup	Taiwan	Silver
Aldrech Ramos	(Philippines)	2015	2015 William Jones Cup	Taiwan	Silver
Terrence Romeo	(Philippines)	2015	2015 FIBA Asia Championship	Changsia	Silver

Arturo Valenzona 1964 national team to the Yokohama pre Olympics (eliminated)
