= Leo Austria =

Filipino basketball player and coach

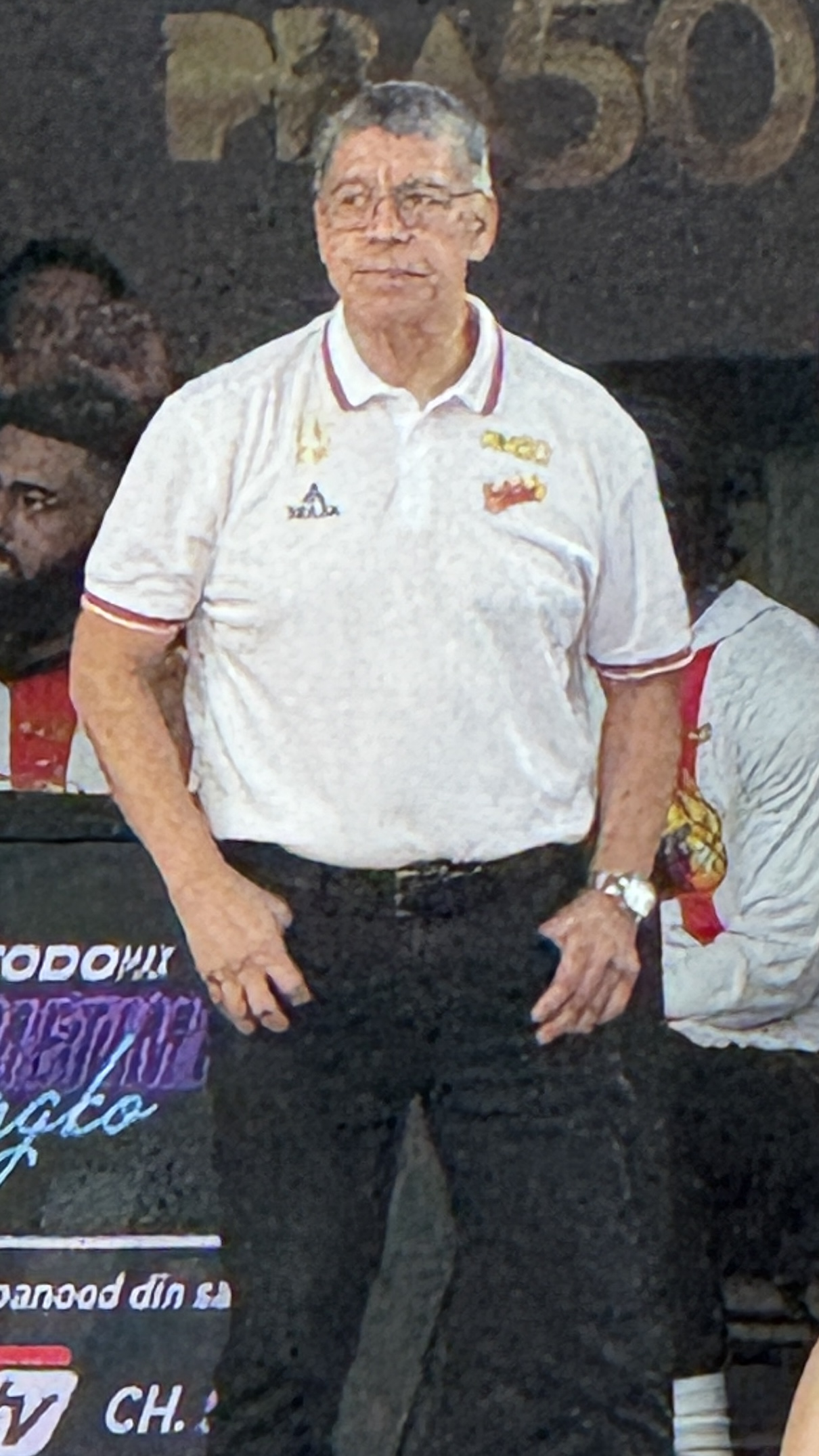
- Austria in 2026

San Miguel Beermen
- Position: Head coach
- League: PBA

Personal information
- Born: March 14, 1958 (age 68) Sariaya, Quezon, Philippines
- Listed height: 5 ft 10 in (1.78 m)

Career information
- College: Lyceum
- PBA draft: 1985: 4th round
- Drafted by: Shell Azodrin Bugbusters
- Playing career: 1985–1993

Career history

Playing
- 1985–1991: Formula Shell
- 1992–1993: Pepsi
- 1999: Chowking Fastfood Kings

Coaching
- 1998–2002: Chowking Fastfood Kings/Shark Energy Drink Power Boosters
- 2002–2004: Welcoat Paintmasters
- 2004–2005: Shell Turbo Chargers
- 2005: Adamson
- 2006: Welcoat Paintmasters
- 2006–2008: Welcoat Dragons
- 2008–2013: Adamson
- 2012–2013: San Miguel Beermen (ABL)
- 2014–2022; 2024–present: San Miguel Beermen
- 2023–2024: San Miguel Beermen (consultant)

Career highlights
- As coach: 11× PBA champion (2014–15 Philippine, 2015 Governors', 2015–16 Philippine, 2016–17 Philippine, 2017 Commissioner's, 2017–18 Philippine, 2019 Philippine, 2019 Commissioner's, 2022 Philippine, 2025 Philippine, 2025–26 Philippine); 4× PBA Baby Dalupan Coach of the Year (2015–2017, 2019); 5× PBA All-Star Game head coach (2015–2018, 2026); 3× PBL Champion (2001 Challenge, 2002 Alaxan-Challenge, 2003 Challenge); ABL Coach of the Year (2013); ABL champion (2013); As consultant: PBA champion (2023–24 Commissioner's); As player: PBA champion (1990 First Conference); PBA Rookie of the Year (1985); 1988 Quezon Medalya ng Karangalan Award for Sports; PABL Most Valuable Player (1984 Ambassador's)

Leovino Austria (born March 14, 1958) is a Filipino professional basketball coach and former player who is the head coach of the San Miguel Beermen of the Philippine Basketball Association (PBA). He previously coached the team from 2014 to 2022, leading the team to nine PBA championships out of the ten Finals appearances. He also served as head consultant of the Beermen.

== Playing career ==
Austria played his college basketball for the Lyceum of the Philippines University while also suiting up in the commercial Philippine Amateur Basketball League via Masagana 99. In 1984, he was named the Most Valuable Player of the Ambassador's Cup before joining the PBA.

In 1985, a new team Formula Shell drafted him, aside from nabbing fellow PABL standout Sonny Cabatu in the said draft. He made a quick impact for the new but veteran laden Shell squad and won the Rookie of the Year honors at season's end. His average of 3.9 points per game for that season marked the lowest average for a Rookie of the Year awardee up to that time. During his stint at Shell, he played backup point guard for Bernie Fabiosa, Al Solis, then Ronnie Magsanoc. He later played for Pepsi and was out of the league after the 1993 season. In 394 games played, he averaged 4.5 points a ballgame. He was known for his three-point shooting.

In 1988, he was awarded the Quezon Medalya ng Karangalan Award for Sports. The QMK Award is given to outstanding Quezonians who excelled in their chosen fields. In 1999, he suited up for a few games as a playing coach for his team Chowking due to injuries of his point guards.

== Coaching career ==
=== Philippine Basketball League ===
Austria's first coaching stint was for Chowking during the late 90s. During those days, he steered Chowking to numerous semifinal appearances but were unable to clinch a finals appearance against powerhouse and PBA-bound team Tanduay, Red Bull, and Welcoat.

After Chowking was renamed as Shark Energy Drink in 2000, he led the team to two titles in four finals matches against Welcoat from 2000 to 2002. He coached a team led by Chester Tolomia, Roger Yap, Ervin Sotto, and Gilbert Malabanan.

In late 2002, he moved to former rival Welcoat Paints as its new head coach after returning from a one conference absence. With a star-studded lineup of Rommel Adducul, Paul Artadi, Eddie Laure, Ronald Tubid, and Marc Pingris, he led the Paintmasters to the 2002 PBL Challenge Cup championship over Dazz in a three-game sweep.

He later led Welcoat to a runner-up finish in 2003 with James Yap as one of its star players.

=== Shell Turbo Chargers ===
In 2004, Shell dismissed American head coach John Moran and named Austria as its new head coach, 19 years after starting his PBA career with the said team. During his only season with the Turbo Chargers, he coached a young but talented team of Tony dela Cruz, Ronald Tubid, Rookie of the Year Rich Alvarez, Billy Mamaril, and Roger Yap to two semifinal appearances and a third-place finish in the 2005 PBA Fiesta Conference. However, Shell disbanded after the 2004–2005 season. He then returned to the amateur ranks.

=== Adamson Falcons ===
In 2006, Austria was named head coach of the Adamson Falcons in the UAAP replacing Mel Alas after a disappointing 3-11 stint. With him at the helm, the Falcons made their first-ever Final Four appearance since the format was introduced. However, they were eliminated by the Ateneo Blue Eagles in a closely fought semifinals. He coached the team until in 2013, following a dismal UAAP Season 76 campaign, he resigned. In seven seasons serving as Adamson's tactician, he piled up an overall win–loss record of 40–56, including three trips to the Final Four in Seasons 69, 73 and 74.

=== Rain or Shine Elasto Painters/Welcoat Dragons ===
In 2006, Welcoat bought the Shell franchise to join the PBA as its 10th member. With this development, Austria was renamed head coach of the Welbest franchise, this time carrying the banner of Rain or Shine Elasto Painters in preparation for their PBA debut. The Painters placed third in the 2006 PBL Unity Cup in the team's final conference.

He was formally named as the head coach of the Welcoat Dragons in the PBA. But after two seasons with the team, in 2008, he resigned as head coach citing that the management wanted a new direction. His former assistant Caloy Garcia took over his spot.

=== San Miguel Beermen (ABL) ===
Austria coached the San Miguel Beermen in the ABL where he was awarded as the Coach of the Year in 2013 and helped the team win the championship that same year.

=== San Miguel Beermen in the PBA ===
In 2014, Austria renewed his ties with the San Miguel franchise by signing a one-year deal to be the head coach of the Beermen. He won his first championship with SMB as a PBA head coach after defeating the Alaska Aces in seven games of the 2014–15 PBA Philippine Cup Finals. But in the Commissioner's Cup the Beermen failed to qualify in the playoffs. However, in the season ending tournament of the Governor's Cup he was able to steer the Beermen to another championship once again against the Aces this time in a sweep.

Austria later coached the team to seven more championships out of the next eight Finals appearances, which started with the 2015–16 PBA Philippine Cup Finals, in which they came back from an 0–3 deficit. When the Beermen lost to the Barangay Ginebra San Miguel in the 2018 PBA Commissioner's Cup Finals, it was the team's first Finals loss under Austria.

== Personal life ==
Austria is married to his wife Nanette. Nanette had a kidney transplant on the afternoon Austria won the 2018 PBA Philippine Cup. They have three kids, including Bacon, a basketball player himself. Bacon won the 2013 PBA D-League Foundation Cup with Blackwater Sports a day after his father won the 2013 ABL finals with the San Miguel Beermen. Father and son have previously been on opposing teams in the UAAP, with Leo coaching Adamson, and Bacon playing for Ateneo.

== Coaching record ==
=== Professional record ===
Season	Team	Conference	Elims./Clas. round					Playoffs				
Season	Team	Conference	GP	W	L	PCT	Finish	GP	W	L	PCT	Results
2004–05	Shell	Philippine Cup	18	12	6	.667	3rd	4	0	4	.000	Lost in third-place playoff
2004–05	Shell	Fiesta	18	7	11	.389	9th	8	5	3	.625	Won in third-place playoff
2006–07	Welcoat	Philippine Cup	18	3	15	.167	10th	0				Did not qualify
2006–07	Welcoat	Fiesta	18	4	14	.222	10th	0				Did not qualify
2007–08	Welcoat	Philippine Cup	18	4	14	.222	10th	0				Did not qualify
2013	SMB	ABL	22	19	3	.863	1st	7	6	1	.857	Won the finals
2014–15	San Miguel	Philippine Cup	11	9	2	.818	1st	11	8	3	.727	Won the finals
2014–15	San Miguel	Commissioner's Cup	11	4	7	.364	9th	0				Did not qualify
2014–15	San Miguel	Governors' Cup	11	8	3	.727	1st	10	8	2	.800	Won the finals
2015–16	San Miguel	Philippine Cup	11	9	2	.818	2nd	13	8	5	.615	Won the finals
2015–16	San Miguel	Commissioner's Cup	11	8	3	.727	1st	6	2	4	.333	Lost in the semifinals
2015–16	San Miguel	Governors' Cup	11	8	3	.727	2nd	6	3	3	.500	Lost in the semifinals
2016–17	San Miguel	Philippine Cup	11	10	1	.909	1st	13	9	4	.694	Won the finals
2016–17	San Miguel	Commissioner's Cup	11	9	2	.818	2nd	11	8	3	.727	Won the finals
2016–17	San Miguel	Governors' Cup	11	7	4	.636	6th	1	0	1	.000	Lost the quarterfinals
2017–18	San Miguel	Philippine Cup	11	8	3	.727	1st	11	9	2	.818	Won the finals
2017–18	San Miguel	Commissioner's Cup	11	6	5	.545	6th	12	7	5	.583	Lost the finals
2017–18	San Miguel	Governors' Cup	11	6	5	.545	6th	1	0	1	.000	Lost the quarterfinals
2019	San Miguel	Philippine Cup	11	7	4	.636	5th	16	11	5	.688	Won the finals
2019	San Miguel	Commissioner's Cup	11	5	6	.455	7th	12	9	3	.750	Won the finals
2019	San Miguel	Governors' Cup	11	6	5	.545	6th	1	0	1	.000	Lost the quarterfinals
Totals			277	159	118	.574		143	93	50	.650	9 championships

=== Collegiate record ===
Season	Team	Eliminations					Playoffs				
Season	Team	GP	W	L	PCT	Finish	PG	W	L	PCT	Results
2006	AdU	12	6	6	.500	4th	2	0	2	.000	Semifinals
2008	AdU	14	3	11	.214	7th	—	—	—	—	Eliminated
2009	AdU	14	5	9	.358	5th	—	—	—	—	Eliminated
2010	AdU	14	9	5	.643	3rd	1	0	1	.000	Semifinals
2011	AdU	14	10	4	.714	2nd	2	0	2	.000	Semifinals
2012	AdU	14	3	11	.214	6th	—	—	—	—	Eliminated
2013	AdU	14	4	10	.286	7th	—	—	—	—	Eliminated
Totals		96	40	56	.417		5	0	5	.000	0 championship

Preceded by Unknown	Chowking/Shark head coach 1990s–2002	Succeeded by Jing Ruiz
Preceded by Junel Baculi	Welcoat/Rain or Shine PBL franchise head coach 2002–2004	Succeeded by Caloy Garcia
Preceded by John Moran	Shell Turbo Chargers head coach 2004–2005	Succeeded by Final
Preceded by Caloy Garcia	Welcoat/Rain or Shine PBL franchise head coach 2006	Succeeded by Final
Preceded by Mel Alas	Adamson Falcons head coach 2006	Succeeded by Bogs Adornado
Preceded by First	Welcoat Dragons head coach 2006–2008	Succeeded by Caloy Garcia
Preceded by Bogs Adornado	Adamson Falcons head coach 2008–2013	Succeeded by Kenneth Duremdes
Preceded by Bobby Parks	San Miguel Beermen (ABL) head coach 2012–2013	Succeeded by Final
Preceded by Biboy Ravanes	San Miguel Beermen head coach 2014–present	Succeeded by (incumbent)
