= 2004–05 Shell Turbo Chargers season =

- Head coach: John Moran; Leo Austria

Fiesta Conference (Transition) results
- Record: 7–12 (36.8%)
- Place: 8th
- Playoff finish: Wildcard

Philippine Cup results
- Record: 15–12 (55.6%)
- Place: 4th
- Playoff finish: Semifinals

Fiesta Conference results
- Record: 13–14 (48.1%)
- Place: 3rd
- Playoff finish: Semifinals

Shell Turbo Chargers seasons

The 2004–2005 Shell Turbo Chargers season was the 20th and final season of the franchise in the Philippine Basketball Association (PBA).

== Draft picks ==
Round	Pick	Player	Nationality	College
1	1	Rich Alvarez	Philippines	Ateneo de Manila
2	12	Carlo Sharma	Philippines	De La Salle

== Transactions ==
Transactions
Kalani Ferreria ^{Rookie free agent signed}
Billy Mamaril ^{Acquired from Purefoods when they traded Eddie Laure and their 7th pick in the rookie draft}
Ervin Sotto ^{Acquired from Purefoods in September 2004 when they traded Mike Hrabak}
Roger Yap ^{Acquired from FedEx in the 2004–05 Philippine Cup when they traded their first round pick in the 2005 rookie draft}
Celino Cruz ^{Signed in the 2004–05 Philippine Cup}
Marlon Legaspi ^{Signed in the 2004–05 Philippine Cup}

== Occurrences ==
American John Moran was named Shell's new head coach starting the season, replacing Perry Ronquillo, Moran was signed to a six-month contract but on March 22, he was sacked by Shell management after the Turbo Chargers tallied a 1–5 won-loss record, Moran was succeeded by former Shell cager Leo Austria.

== Roster ==
2004–05 Shell Turbo Chargers roster
Players

Pos.	#	POB	Name	Height	Weight	DOB (YYYY–MM–DD)	From
G	1	(Philippines)	Celino Cruz	5 ft 9 in (1.75 m)			Far Eastern
F	2	(Philippines)	Billy Mamaril	6 ft 6 in (1.98 m)			Bakersfield
F	3	(United States)	Chris Jackson	6 ft 4 in (1.93 m)			San Bernardino Valley
F	6	(Philippines)	Edwin Bacani (M)	6 ft 3 in (1.91 m)			Far Eastern
G	7	(Philippines)	Rensy Bajar	5 ft 10 in (1.78 m)			San Beda
G/F	8	(Philippines)	Ronald Tubid	6 ft 1 in (1.85 m)			UE
G	9	(Philippines)	Chris Calaguio	6 ft 2 in (1.88 m)			Letran
F	10	(Philippines)	Rich Alvarez	6 ft 4 in (1.93 m)			Ateneo
G	11	(Philippines)	Kalani Ferreria	6 ft 3 in (1.91 m)
G	12	(Philippines)	Porferio Marzan	6 ft 2 in (1.88 m)			Baguio
G	13	(Philippines)	Roger Yap	6 ft 1 in (1.85 m)			USJ–R
F	16	(Philippines)	Adonis Santa Maria	6 ft 5 in (1.96 m)			De La Salle
F/C	27	(Philippines)	Carlo Sharma	6 ft 6 in (1.98 m)			De La Salle
F/C	29	(Philippines)	Marlon Legaspi	6 ft 5 in (1.96 m)			MLQU
F/C	30	(Philippines)	Ervin Sotto	6 ft 7 in (2.01 m)			Saint Francis of Assisi
G	35	(United States)	Tony Dela Cruz	6 ft 4 in (1.93 m)			UC Irvine

Coaches
Head coach
- (Philippines) Leo Austria
Assistant(s)
- (Philippines) Bogs Adornado

Legend
- (DP) Unsigned draft pick
- (FA) Free agent
- (S) Suspended
- (M) Moved to Coca-Cola
- Injured

== Philippine Cup ==
=== Game log ===
2004–05 PBA Philippine Cup game log
October

Game	Date	Opponent	Score	High points	High rebounds	High assists	Location Attendance	Record
1	October 6	Coca Cola	83–91	Tubid (15)			Araneta Coliseum	0–1
2	October 12	Red Bull	93–86	Alvarez (27)			Cagayan de Oro	1–1
3	October 15	Sta.Lucia	84–78	Dela Cruz (24)			Philsports Arena	2–1
4	October 20	San Miguel	70–67	Tubid (18)			Araneta Coliseum	3–1
5	October 24	Brgy.Ginebra	86–81	Dela Cruz (28)			Araneta Coliseum	4–1
6	October 28	Alaska	80–78 OT	Mamaril (16)			Iloilo City	5–1

November

Game	Date	Opponent	Score	High points	High rebounds	High assists	Location Attendance	Record
7	November 3	Talk 'N Text					Araneta Coliseum	5–2
8	November 10	Red Bull	90–94				Araneta Coliseum	5–3
10	November 17	FedEx	101–99				Araneta Coliseum	6–4

December

Game	Date	Opponent	Score	High points	High rebounds	High assists	Location Attendance	Record
14	December 1	Alaska	89–85	Dela Cruz (24)			Araneta Coliseum	9–5
15	December 5	Sta. Lucia	84–83	Dela Cruz (27)			Araneta Coliseum	10–5
16	December 9	Brgy.Ginebra					Urdaneta City	10–6
17	December 15	Talk 'N Text	103–98	Tubid (28)			Araneta Coliseum	11–6
18	December 19	FedEx	90–85	Calaguio (28)			Makati Coliseum	12–6

2004–05 schedule

== Recruited imports ==
Tournament	Name	#	Height	From	GP
2004 PBA Fiesta Conference	Marek Ondera	21	6 ft 7 in (2.01 m)	California-Irvine	
2004 PBA Fiesta Conference	Jameel Watkins	40	6 ft 10 in (2.08 m)	Georgetown University	
2005 PBA Fiesta Conference	Wesley Wilson	33	6 ft 11 in (2.11 m)	Georgetown University	10
2005 PBA Fiesta Conference	Melvin Robinson	50	7 ft 0 in (2.13 m)	Saint Louis University	4
2005 PBA Fiesta Conference	Ajani Williams	21	6 ft 10 in (2.08 m)	Eastern Michigan	13

^{GP – Games played}
