= 2004–05 Purefoods Tender Juicy Hotdogs season =

- Head coach: Ryan Gregorio
- General manager: Rene Pardo (January – February 7, 2004); Ed Cordero
- Owner: San Miguel-Purefoods

Fiesta Conference (Transition) results
- Record: 4–14 (22.2%)
- Place: 10th
- Playoff finish: Wildcard (lost to Coke in one game)

Philippine Cup results
- Record: 9–9 (50%)
- Place: 6th
- Playoff finish: Quarterfinals (lost to Shell in the Quarterfinals, 1–2)

Fiesta Conference results
- Record: 7–11 (38.9%)
- Place: 9th
- Playoff finish: Quarterfinals (lost to Shell in the Quarterfinals, 2–0)

Purefoods Tender Juicy Hotdogs seasons

The 2004–2005 Purefoods Tender Juicy Hotdogs season was the 17th season of the franchise in the Philippine Basketball Association (PBA) and 4th season under the ownership of San Miguel Corporation.

== Draft picks ==
Round	Pick	Player	Nationality	College
1	2	James Yap	Philippines	UE
1	7	Ervin Sotto	Philippines	St. Francis of Assisi
2	11	Paul Artadi	Philippines	UE

== Occurrences ==
On February 7, 2004, Rene Pardo promoted as team governor of the team. He was replaced by Ed Cordero.

Upon celebrating his 38th birthday in November 2004, Purefoods power forward and four-time MVP Alvin Patrimonio called it quits and retired from active competition a month after the opening of the PBA's 2004–05 season, ending a storied 16-year career and becoming one of the few players to have spent his whole pro career playing for only one team. Patrimonio's last full conference was in the transition tournament called Fiesta Conference earlier in the year.

== Roster ==
2004–05 Purefoods Tender Juicy Hotdogs roster
Players

Pos.	#	POB	Name	Height	Weight	DOB (YYYY–MM–DD)	From
G	1	(Philippines)	Peter June Simon	6 ft 1 in (1.85 m)			Mindanao
F	2	(Philippines)	Richard Yee	6 ft 4 in (1.93 m)			UST
G	3	(Philippines)	Tony Boy Espinosa	5 ft 7 in (1.70 m)			De La Salle
G	4	(Philippines)	Paul Artadi	5 ft 9 in (1.75 m)			UE
G	6	(Philippines)	Gilbert Demape (M)	6 ft 1 in (1.85 m)			Cebu Tech
F	7	(Philippines)	Rey Evangelista	6 ft 3 in (1.91 m)			UST
F/C	9	(Philippines)	Jun Limpot	6 ft 5 in (1.96 m)			De La Salle
F	11	(Philippines)	Eddie Laure	6 ft 3 in (1.91 m)			Adamson
F	16	(Philippines)	Alvin Patrimonio (C)	6 ft 3 in (1.91 m)			Mapúa
G/F	18	(Philippines)	James Yap	6 ft 3 in (1.91 m)			UE
C	21	(Philippines)	Kerby Raymundo	6 ft 6 in (1.98 m)			Letran
G	25	(United States)	Rob Johnson	6 ft 0 in (1.83 m)
G	40	(Philippines)	Noy Castillo	6 ft 0 in (1.83 m)			The Citadel
C	41	(Philippines)	Zaldy Realubit	6 ft 6 in (1.98 m)			USJ–R
F	54	(United States)	Mike Hrabak	6 ft 6 in (1.98 m)			Central Arizona

Coaches
Head coach
- (Philippines) Ryan Gregorio
Assistant(s)
- (Philippines) Ronnie Magsanoc

Legend
- (DP) Unsigned draft pick
- (FA) Free agent
- (S) Suspended
- (M) Moved to Sta.Lucia
- Injured

== Philippine Cup ==
=== Game log ===
2005 PBA Philippine Cup game log
October

Game	Date	Opponent	Score	High points	High rebounds	High assists	Location Attendance	Record
1	October 6	Brgy.Ginebra	104–87	Castillo (22)			Araneta Coliseum	1–0
2	October 10	Coca Cola	78–76	Raymundo (22)			Araneta Coliseum	2–0
3	October 15	Red Bull	81–101	Raymundo (21)			Philsports Arena	2–1
4	October 19	Talk 'N Text	87–101				Dumaguete	2–2
5	October 22	Sta.Lucia	89–87	Castillo (20) Limpot (20)			Philsports Arena	3–2
6	October 29	FedEx	98–102				Araneta Coliseum	3–3

December

Game	Date	Opponent	Score	High points	High rebounds	High assists	Location Attendance	Record
13	December 2	Coca Cola	82–76	Raymundo (17)			Lipa City	7–6
14	December 8	San Miguel	86–93	Raymundo (20)			Philsports Arena	7–7
15	December 10	Sta.Lucia	89–91				Araneta Coliseum	7–8
16	December 14	Red Bull	92–88	Castillo (19)			Cavite City	8–8
17	December 17	Alaska	70–86	Limpot (15)			Ynares Center	8–9
18	December 22	FedEx	112–110	Simon (23)			Philsports Arena	9–9

2004–05 schedule

== Transactions ==
=== Trades ===
Traded	to	For
Eddie Laure; 7th overall pick, 2004	Shell Turbo Chargers ^{2004}	Billy Mamaril
Jun Limpot	Barangay Ginebra Kings ^{2004}	Andy Seigle; Rodney Santos
Ervin Sotto	Shell Turbo Chargers ^{2004}	Michael Hrabak

=== Additions ===
Player	Signed	Former team
Peter June Simon	2004	drafted by Sta. Lucia Realtors
Tonyboy Espinosa	2004–05 Philippine Cup	Free Agent
Zaldy Realubit	2004–05 Philippine Cup	Free Agent

=== Recruited imports ===
Tournament	Name	#	Height	From	GP
2004 PBA Fiesta Conference	Lenny Cooke		6 ft 6 in (1.98 m)	Northern Valley	1
2004 PBA Fiesta Conference	Reggie Butler	55	6 ft 9 in (2.06 m)	Xavier University	2
2004 PBA Fiesta Conference	Eddie Elisma	2	6 ft 8 in (2.03 m)	Georgia Tech	8
2004 PBA Fiesta Conference	Tyrone Washington	42	6 ft 9 in (2.06 m)	Mississippi State	3
2004 PBA Fiesta Conference	Joe Zaletel		6 ft 7 in (2.01 m)	Arizona State	3
2004 PBA Fiesta Conference	James Head		6 ft 7 in (2.01 m)	Eastern Michigan	1
2005 PBA Fiesta Conference	Antonio Smith		6 ft 8 in (2.03 m)	Michigan State	11
2005 PBA Fiesta Conference	Lorenzo Coleman		7 ft 1 in (2.16 m)	Tennessee Tech	7
2005 PBA Fiesta Conference	Marcus Melvin	54	6 ft 8 in (2.03 m)	North Carolina State	5

^{GP – Games played}
