= James Yap =

Filipino basketball player and politician

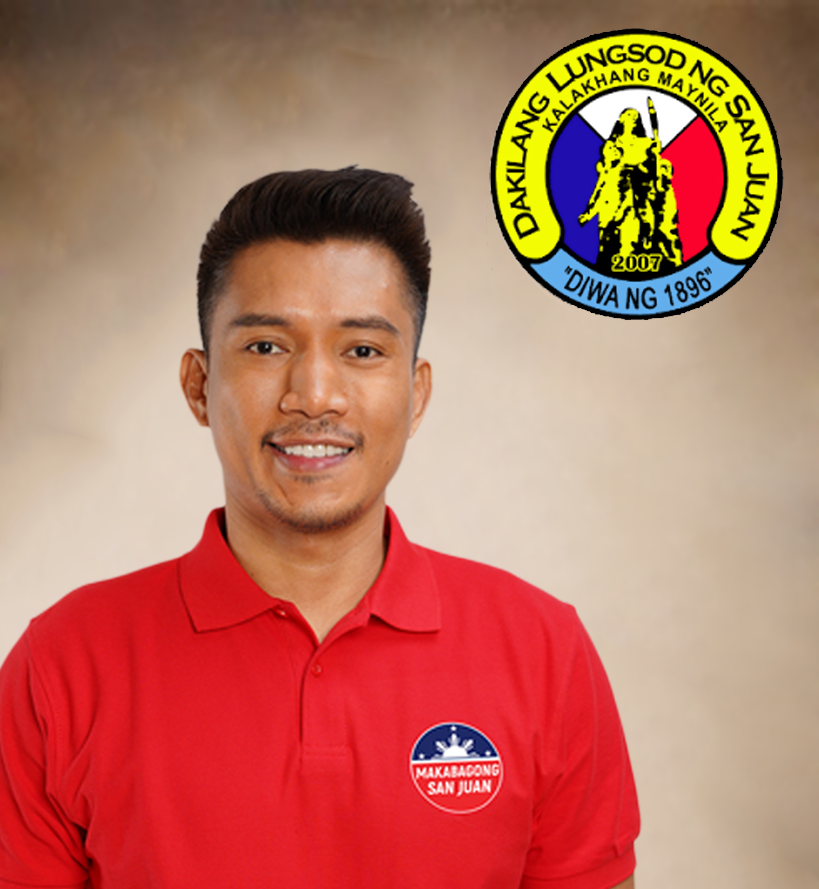
- Official portrait, 2022

Member of the San Juan City Council from the 1st district
- Incumbent
- Assumed office June 30, 2022

Personal details
- Born: James Carlos Agravante Yap; February 15, 1982 (age 44) Escalante, Negros Occidental, Philippines
- Party: PFP (2024–present)
- Other political affiliations: PDP–Laban (2021–2024)
- Spouse: Kris Aquino (m. 2005; ann. 2012)
- Children: 3 (including Bimby)
- Basketball career

Free agent
- Position: Shooting guard / small forward

Personal information
- Listed height: 6 ft 2 in (1.88 m)
- Listed weight: 192 lb (87 kg)

Career information
- High school: Bacolod Tay Tung High School; Iloilo Central Commercial High School (Iloilo City)
- College: UE
- PBA draft: 2004: 1st round, 2nd overall pick
- Drafted by: Purefoods Tender Juicy Hotdogs
- Playing career: 2004–present
- Number: 18, 15

Career history
- 2004–2016: Star Hotshots
- 2016–2021, 2023–2024: Rain or Shine Elasto Painters
- 2024: Blackwater Bossing

Career highlights
- 7× PBA champion (2005–06 Philippine, 2009–10 Philippine, 2012 Commissioner's, 2013 Governors' 2013–14 Philippine, 2014 Commissioner's, 2014 Governors'); 4× PBA Finals MVP (2009–10 Philippine, 2012 Commissioner's, 2014 Commissioner's, 2014 Governors'); 2× PBA Most Valuable Player (2006, 2010); PBA Best Player of the Conference (2009–10 Philippine); 18× PBA All-Star (2004–2019, 2023, 2024); PBA All-Star Game MVP (2012); 3× PBA Mythical First Team (2006, 2010, 2012); PBA Mythical Second Team (2011); PBA All-Rookie Team (2005); 2× PBA Three-Point Shootout champion (2009, 2018); PBA Scoring Champion (2009); 50 Greatest Players in PBA History (2015 selection); 2× PBL Mythical First Team (2003, 2004); UAAP Most Valuable Player (2003); 2× UAAP Mythical Five (2002, 2003)

James Carlos Agravante Yap Sr. (born February 15, 1982) is a Filipino professional basketball player and politician who last played for the Blackwater Bossing of the Philippine Basketball Association (PBA). Known by his nickname Big Game James, he is widely regarded as one of the greatest players to ever play in the PBA.

Yap spent his high school career initially with Bacolod Tay Tung High School before moving to Iloilo Central Commercial High School. In college, he spent his entire college career with the University of the East, playing for the Red Warriors. He won the MVP award in Season 66 (2003) and was part of two Mythical Five teams. During this time he also played in the Philippine Basketball League.

In 2004, Yap was selected second overall by the Star Hotshots in the 2004 PBA draft. He spent twelve years with the Purefoods franchise before being sent to the Rain or Shine Elasto Painters in 2016 in a blockbuster trade. He played for Rain or Shine for eight years, though he took a break in 2022 as he began to get into politics. In 2024, he moved to the Blackwater Bossing, and has since yet to return.

In politics, he is currently serving as the city councilor for San Juan, where he has assumed office since 2022.

== Amateur career ==
=== Private Schools Athletic Association (PRISAA) ===
Yap was born in Escalante, Negros Occidental. As a child, Yap already showed athleticism playing football, baseball, and track and field until high school. Growing up, he looked up to one of the most prolific players in the history of Philippine Basketball, Samboy Lim.

Yap emerged to be one of the most promising basketball stars in the Iloilo/Negros region back in the late 1990s. Early on that decade, he played for the Bacolod Tay Tung High School and made his mark. He was transferred to Iloilo Central Commercial High School, displaying his skills. Manila Standard. Along the way, he sparked his team to three consecutive Iloilo PRISAA titles.

=== University Athletic Association of the Philippines (UAAP) ===
Instead, Yap went on to play at the collegiate level where he polished his skills. He played for the UE Red Warriors under former national team coach Boysie Zamar. In 2002, known for his quick-release shooting and all-around presence, he, alongside Paul Artadi and Ronald Tubid, brought the Red Warriors to the Final Four after years of absence. However, second seed University of the East lost to a dramatic semifinal series as they faced the Ateneo Blue Eagles the eventual champions. Nevertheless, Yap established himself as one of the most prolific scorers averaging more than 20 points per game in just his third year in the league.

In the same year, he led UE to the first Bantay Bata Crossover Cup, exacting a sweet revenge against Ateneo in the finals. A month after, he again led UE to the inaugural Collegiate Champions League crown, beating FEU.

In the 66th season of UAAP, Yap led the Red Warriors to the Final Four for the second straight time as he topped his teammates in points and rebounding, and closed second to Artadi in overall efficiency rating. Eventually in the semifinals series, the Warriors lost to a much more defense-orchestrated team, the Far Eastern University Tamaraws led by tactician coach Koy Banal and star player Arwind Santos. Nevertheless, Yap was named as the Most Valuable Player from coaches, players, and media votes. In the same year, he, along with incourt partner Paul Artadi, was teamed up with other UAAP and PBL counterparts to lead the Philippines in the 2003 Southeast Asian Games to a gold medal finish and was eventually honored by Philippines Sportswriter Association as the best basketball player in the amateurs alongside the best player in the professional level, Asi Taulava.

=== Philippine Basketball League ===
Yap played in the Philippine Basketball League from 2001 to 2004. In 2001, he played for the ICTSI-La Salle Archers forming a backcourt tandem with Mike Cortez that almost had their team beating the veteran-laden Shark Energy Drink in the finals. In 2002, along with Mark Cardona and Joseph Yeo, he helped put the Archers in the playoffs against the Blu Detergent Kings. In 2003, he had to sit out the whole conference after ICTSI refused to sign his release papers to make him eligible to play for Sunkist-Pampanga. In 2004, Yap signed up for one conference with the Welcoat Paintmasters, teaming up with the comebacking Jojo Tangkay, leading them to a runner-up finish. He and Tangkay lost to PJ Simon of the Fash team for the MVP plum.

== PBA career ==
=== Star Hotshots (2004–2016) ===
==== Rookie season (2004–05) ====
Yap entered the 2004 PBA draft, and was selected as the second overall pick by the Purefoods Tender Juicy Giants. The Giants were coming off a disappointing 2003 season, after failing to enter the quarterfinals of the three conferences. They ended the season with a dismal 9–27 win loss card (a franchise low). Their best player, Alvin Patrimonio, announced his retirement in November 2004, after playing his entire career with the team. During his rookie season, Yap mostly came off the bench. Bothered by an ailing shoulder, Yap had a slow start in the 2004–05 season but later on, he improved as he had numerous games where he scored 20 or more points. By the end of the season, he averaged 12.48 points per game (ppg), 4.70 rebounds per game (rpg) and 1.03 assists per game (apg) in 26.9 minutes per game (mpg). However, Purefoods failed to get past the quarterfinal round against the Shell Turbo Chargers. Despite leading all rookies in scoring, Yap eventually lost to Rich Alvarez in the Rookie of the Year award race.

==== First MVP award (2005–06) ====
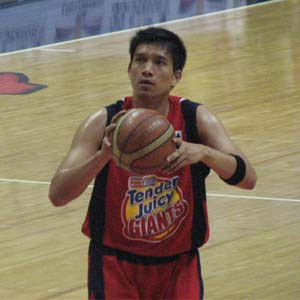
James Yap shooting a free throw in 2008

In the 2005–06 season, Yap received more playing time and began to show more of his abilities as a talented young guard. In the 2005–06 Fiesta Conference, Yap was 4th in the statistical race, behind at the end of the semifinals series, while the Giants finished 4–2 at the series conclusion.

In the classification round of the 2006 Philippine Cup, the Chunkee Giants finished with a 12–4 record. In the first round of the all-Filipino Cup, Yap recorded 34 points against the Sta. Lucia Realtors then had a career-high 37 points to beat the Barangay Ginebra Kings. Near the end of the round, he played an important role in the win against the powerhouse team Talk 'N Text. The victory put the Purefoods team in a first-place finish in the classification phase, earning them an outright semifinals berth for the second consecutive time. After the accumulation of player statistics at the end of the semis, Yap edged out teammate Kerby Raymundo and Red Bull's Enrico Villanueva for the Philippine Basketball Association Most Valuable Player award by recording averages of 17.60 ppg, 4.35 rpg, 1.18 apg and 1.19 steals per game (spg) in 36.4 mpg. This made him, at 24 years of age, the fifth youngest player, and second sophomore to have won the individual award. He was the statistical leader and garnered more than 7000 combined votes from players, the 4-man committee, and the media, almost 5000 votes ahead of the rest of the candidates. Yap was the first Purefoods player since Alvin Patrimonio to win the MVP award. He was also named to the Mythical First Team alongside teammates Raymundo and Roger Yap, and on-court rivals Enrico Villanueva and Lordy Tugade.

==== Ups and downs (2006–09) ====
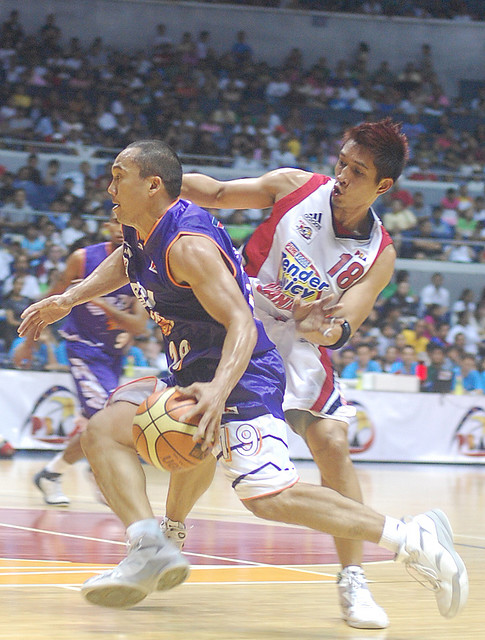
Yap defending Air21's Wynne Arboleda

Yap played in 41 games during the 2006–07 season. He averaged 19.71 ppg, 1.76 apg, 4.22 rpg and 0.63 steals per game while playing an average of 38.39 mpg. On June 1, 2007, Yap scored a career-high 41 points in a 109–97 win over the Welcoat Paints, leading Purefoods to a spot in the wildcard phase of the 2007 PBA Fiesta Conference playoffs. He scored six of the Giants' 11 3-pointers. In the following game against the Coca-Cola Tigers, he scored 40 points as Purefoods lost 100–97, thus being eliminated from the Conference. Despite failing to deliver the win for his team, Yap's efforts equaled former PBA player Nelson Asaytono's record of scoring 40+ points in back-to-back games.

Purefoods had renamed its team to the Tender Juicy Giants for the 2007 PBA Fiesta Conference.

The Giants then had a 7–0 start at the 2007–08 Philippine Cup with Yap having a banner conference. Purefoods eventually clinched the semifinals berth and the No. 1 seed after defeating the Coca-Cola Tigers. In the semifinals, the Giants were up against Red Bull, the winner over the Magnolia Beverage Masters in the quarterfinals series. In game 4, Yap injured his groin in the first quarter after scoring ten points and did not return to the game. Purefoods, now without Yap, ultimately lost the game in overtime, 97–88. After the injury to Yap, Purefoods coach Ryan Gregorio announced prior to Game 5 that the former UE standout would be day-to-day. However, Yap started on Game 5 and helped his team nail a one-point victory, 96–95. After being outscored in the following match, 123–97, Yap led Purefoods to win the series in 7 games, and finally clinch their 12th AFC finals stint (the most by any team in history) against Sta. Lucia Realtors. The Giants lost a controversial 7-game series with Yap serving a suspension in game 5 after the Giants had come back a 0–2 deficit to tie the series at 2–2. They managed to level the series at 3–3 thanks to a classic fourth quarter performance by Yap, who made 5 of 6 three-point attempts and scored 20 points in the fourth quarter. In Game 7 Purefoods struggled in the third quarter with key players in foul trouble, and wasn't able to rally with Sta. Lucia's offence. In the end it was Sta. Lucia who made the crucial shots down the stretch and won the game 100–88.

By the end of the 2007–2008 season, Yap averaged 21.32 ppg, 1.58 apg, 4.06 rpg, 0.76 spg and 0.24 blocks per game (bpg) in 37 minutes playing time.

The 2008–2009 season saw the team playing only 37 games, their lowest in the James Yap-era while failing to advance to the semifinal round of the two conferences played for the season, the Philippine Cup and the Fiesta Conference. In the Philippine Cup, the team posted an 8–10 card to enter the wild-card phase where they were bundled out by the Air21 team 94–82 in the first pair of knockout games. On the other hand, in the Fiesta Conference, the team posted a 7–7 card where it reached the quarterfinals only to be booted out by the Rain or Shine team, 2–1. Notwithstanding, Yap again posted good numbers by averaging 18.08 ppg, 1.61 apg, 4.33 rpg in 35 minutes playing time.

During the 2009 PBA All-Star Weekend at the Araneta Coliseum, Yap scored 21 points to defeat San Miguel Beermen guard Dondon Hontiveros and Burger King Whoppers guard Gary David in the Three-Point Shootout contest.

==== Second MVP award (2009–10) ====
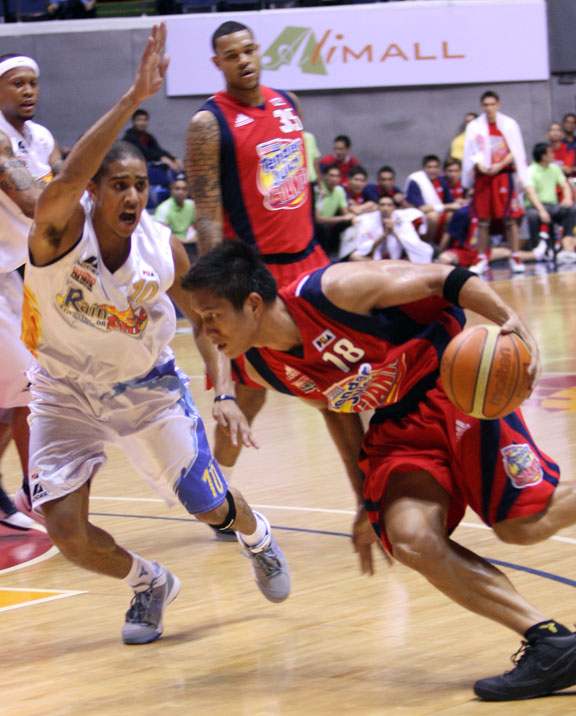
Yap defended by Rain or Shine's Gabe Norwood in 2009

The 2009–10 Philippine Cup started on October 11, 2009. Purefoods finished third in the elimination round with a 12–6 record, outlasted the Rain or Shine Elasto Painters in the quarterfinals in five games, and defeated the No. 2 seed and sister team San Miguel Beermen in six games after trailing the series 1–2. In the finals, Purefoods swept Alaska, 4–0, to be crowned 2009–2010 PBA Philippine Cup champions. During their series against the Aces in the finals, Yap scored 24, 32, 14, and 18 points respectively. For leading his team to this incredible feat, Yap was named Best Player of the Conference (BPC), as well as Finals MVP. He also won his second MVP award, for the 2009–2010 PBA season with averages of 17.98 ppg, 3.50 rpg, 2.02 apg and 0.64 spg while playing almost 34 minutes per ball game. Yap was lauded for winning the award despite numerous distractions he had to deal with off the court. During his acceptance speech, Yap tearfully dedicated his latest trophy to his son Baby James.

During the 2009–10 season, Yap was selected to his 7th All-Star Game appearance. In March 2011, via fan voting, he was voted to his 7th consecutive PBA All-Star Game; Yap collected the most votes with 28, 444 to become the starting guard for the South team.

Starting the 2010 Fiesta Conference, the team changed its name from Purefoods Tender Juicy Giants to B-Meg Derby Ace Llamados. The end of the season, however, marked the departure of coach Ryan Gregorio, who left the Llamados after seven years and signed a deal with PBA returnee Meralco Bolts. Gregorio was succeeded by his assistant and multi-titled Philippine Basketball League coach Jorge Gallent.

==== Defeats and return to glory (2010–2013) ====
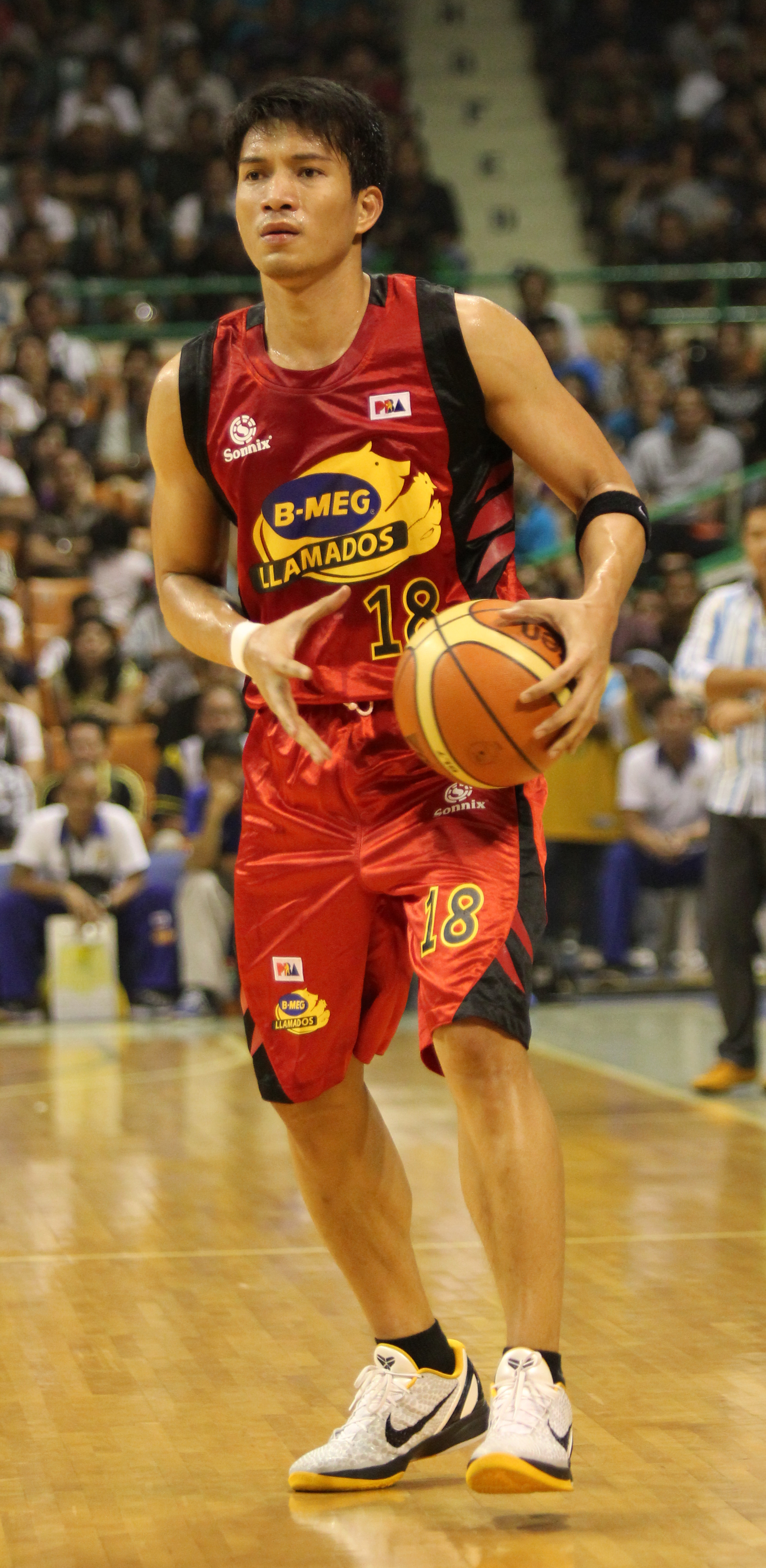
Yap with B-Meg Llamados in 2011

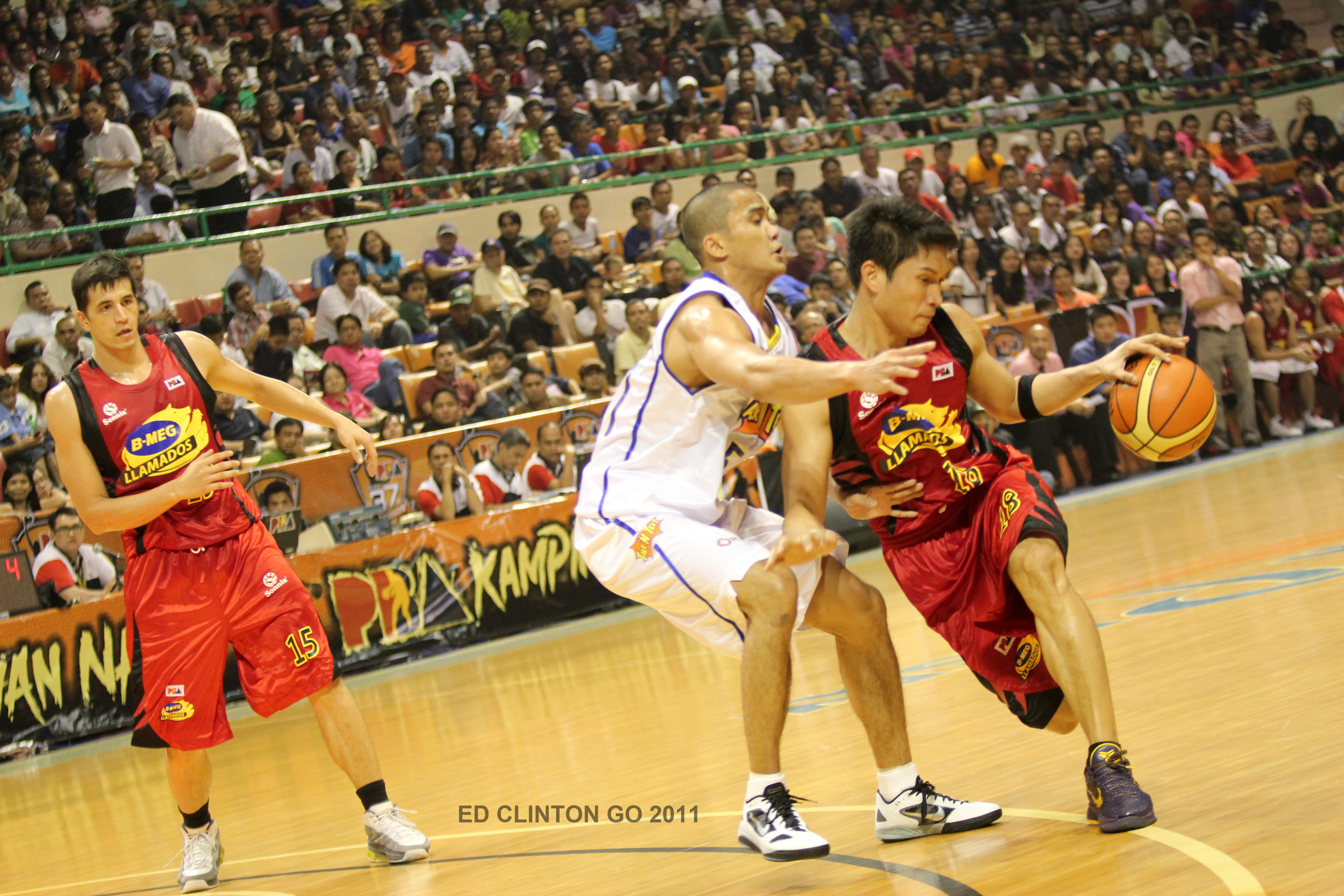
James Yap playing offensively against Aaron Aban of Talk 'N Text Tropang Texters

With Yap's contract expiring in September 2010, B-Meg offered him a three-year deal with an option for the player to extend it for another two years once the second season of the new deal ended. A few weeks before the beginning of the 2010–11 season, it was announced that Yap would be re-signing with B-Meg. The Llamados entered the 2010–11 PBA Philippine Cup as defending champions. In the first round of the tournament, the former University of the East standout averaged 15.1 points per game, while the team ended the Classification Phase with a record of 7–7. The two-time MVP and Peter June Simon led the team to the quarterfinals, in which B-Meg scored back-to-back wins against the Meralco Bolts. For the series, Yap averaged 22.0 points, as the Llamados defeated Meralco in two games. Following this series, the Llamados found themselves on a collision course with the Talk 'N Text Tropang Texters in the semifinals. In a losing effort in Game 1 (B-Meg lost 91–98), Yap recorded a personal conference-high of 36 points. Yap suffered breathing difficulties and struggled with his shooting in Game 2, scoring 13 points in 31 minutes, but still played a main role and came up with a game-winning steal in the final seconds of the last quarter that gave B-Meg an 88–87 victory. The Tropang Texters won Game 3, but the defending champions tied the series 2–2 in Game 4 with a 98–93 win, despite a late rally by TNT in the fourth quarter. Talk N' Text would eventually defeat the Llamados in Game 5 (97–83) and Game 6 (89–72), thus eliminating the defending champions from the tournament. Yap averaged 18.75 ppg, 1.77 apg, 4.30 rpg and 0.60 spg in 36 minutes playing time.

The 2011 PBA Commissioner's Cup, the second conference of the season, began on February 18, 2011. After compiling a 0–2 record in the first two games of the elimination round, the Llamados broke their losing streak with a 121–92 win against the Air21 Express. In the following game against the Barangay Ginebra Kings on March 6, Yap recorded 25 points and grabbed 10 rebounds as B-Meg won 89–96; it was Yap's first double-double since the 2006 Philippine Cup. The two-time MVP was also named Player of the Week from February 28 to March 6. On March 13, 2011, Yap injured his calf in a 91–97 loss against the Alaska Aces. He missed the following four games of the elimination round against Meralco, Smart Gilas, San Miguel and Talk N' Text. The Llamados were eventually eliminated in the first round of the Commissioner's Cup with a 4–5 record. The team's quest for a championship in the 2010–11 season was ended when they were eliminated in the semifinals of the 2011 PBA Governors Cup. Nonetheless, at the end of the season, Yap was selected to the PBA Mythical Second Team.

In the offseason, two weeks after resigning as head coach of the Alaska Aces, Tim Cone was appointed as the new head coach of the Llamados, replacing Jorge Gallent. With a new offensive scheme being enforced by Cone, the triangle offense, the Llamados started the 2011–12 season with a 2–4 record in their first 6 matches of the 2011–12 PBA Philippine Cup. On October 29, 2011, in a closely fought game against Barako Bull, Yap hit a critical 3-pointer to tie the game 79–79 with 1.8 seconds left in the fourth period which sent the match into overtime. However, the Energy ultimately defeated B-Meg 87–84. After B-Meg struggled to win back-to-back games, Yap led the Llamados to an 8-game winning streak in the elimination round of the conference, thus earning them a top stop in the team standings and a twice-to-beat advantage. He was also named the PBA Player of the Week twice. In the quarterfinals B-Meg faced the 8th seeded Powerade Tigers. In an upset, they were eliminated by the Tigers in two games, as they lost 88–97 and 131–123 respectively. It was only the third time in PBA history that the lowest seed eliminated the top seed in the quarterfinals.

Following the upset in the All-Filipino Cup, B-Meg started the 2012 Commissioner's Cup strong with a 6–3 record and a second place-finish in the first round following a 96–94 win against the Powerade Tigers. Expected to lead his team, Yap struggled with his shooting and his performance declined as he averaged 12.9 points and 3.6 rebounds. He was subsequently diagnosed with a sprained ankle but still played an important role for his team. After losing 84–93 in a seeding playoff against Ginebra (the Kings also finished the elimination round with a 6–3 record) for the 2nd spot, in which Yap scored 18 points but was held scoreless in the last quarter, the Llamados found themselves pitted in the quarterfinals against the Meralco Bolts. In April, Yap was named as the starting guard for the Veterans teams for the 2012 All Star Game. In a hardly fought series B-Meg was able to resurge after losing Game 1 and eliminated the Bolts in 3 games, to enter the semifinals against Ginebra. On April 13, 2012, in the first quarter of Game 2, Yap hit his 700th career three-point field goal. The Llamados won the series 3–1, to earn a finals slot against Talk N' Text. On May 6, 2012, the Llamados won the 2012 PBA Commissioner's Cup championship 4–3, and Yap was named Finals MVP.

Yap was a starter for the Veterans squad in the 2012 PBA All-Star Game, where he shared with Dylan Ababou the distinction of holding the highest-scoring individual performance in the history of the game after dropping 44 points. Yap was also adjudged as All-Star Game MVP.

The B-Meg Llamados booked a ticket to the 2012 PBA Governors' Cup finals against the Rain or Shine Elasto Painters, after beating Ginebra 74–72, via a Peter June Simon game-winner. B-Meg dropped their first game 91–80, but the resilient Llamados bounced back and defeated Rain or Shine 85–80 in Game 2, where James Yap was named Best Player of the Game after a 24-point, 9-rebound performance. But B-Meg suffered two straight losses, 93–84 and 94–89 respectively, as Rain or Shine led the series 3–1. But in Game 5, James Yap retaliated with a conference-high 30 points to lead B-meg to a 91–81 victory. Yap dedicated his performance to his former mother-in-law, the late former President Corazon Aquino. Yap then chipped in 20 points in the crucial Game 6, as B-meg won in convincing fashion, 97–81, to tie the series at 3–3. With Game 7 at hand, B-Meg aimed to become just the fourth team in PBA history to come back from a 1–3 deficit in the finals – a feat they had previously accomplished in 2006. They also looked to grab their first back-to-back championships in franchise history. However, the Rain or Shine Elasto Painters fought hard in Game 7 and defeated B-Meg, 83–76 despite Yap's 23-point performance. B-Meg missed crucial shots during crunch time, and import Marqus Blakely fouled out of the game early in the fourth period. At season's end, Yap was selected to the PBA Mythical First Team.

For the 2012–13 season, the Llamados renamed their team as the San Mig Coffee Mixers. The team finished second in the elimination round of the 2012–13 Philippine Cup with a 10–4 win–loss card. The Mixers then faced the Petron Blaze Boosters in the quarterfinals with a twice-to-beat advantage, managing to win 92–87 as the game went into overtime. The victory earned San Mig a place in the semifinals against Rain or Shine. On December 21, Yap led his team to a 106–82 victory in Game 2 over the Elasto Painters as he scored 34 points including 7 triples in 47 minutes of play, to help equalize the series 1–1. In the following matches, however, Yap struggled with his shooting and failed to bring the Mixers to the finals as San Mig lost the series 2–4. After starting the 2013 Commissioner's Cup 0–3, the Mixers acquired returning import Denzel Bowles, in a move to improve the team's results. On March 20, Yap scored his 800th career three-pointer in an 82–87 loss against the Air21 Express. With the help of Yap and Bowles' performances, San Mig ended the classification phase with a record of 8–6, fourth overall in the standings, which gave them an outright quarterfinal slot. The Mixers lost their first game 85–88, with Yap facing back problems as he scored 8 points in 25 minutes. After being held to 7 points in Game 2, Yap bounced back in Game 3 as he scored 20 points in a 90–82 victory to help his team win the series 2–1, sending themselves to the semifinals against the Alaska Aces. However, San Mig failed to reach the finals as the team was ousted by the Aces in three games. The Mixers ended second in the elimination round of the 2013 PBA Governors' Cup, behind the Petron Blaze Boosters. With a twice to beat advantage, San Mig eliminated the Alaska Aces in two games in the quarterfinals; the team then ousted the Meralco Bolts in the semifinals and faced the Boosters in the finals. The Mixers went on to win the series in seven games, giving Yap his 4th title with the team.

==== The Grand Slam (2013–2014) ====
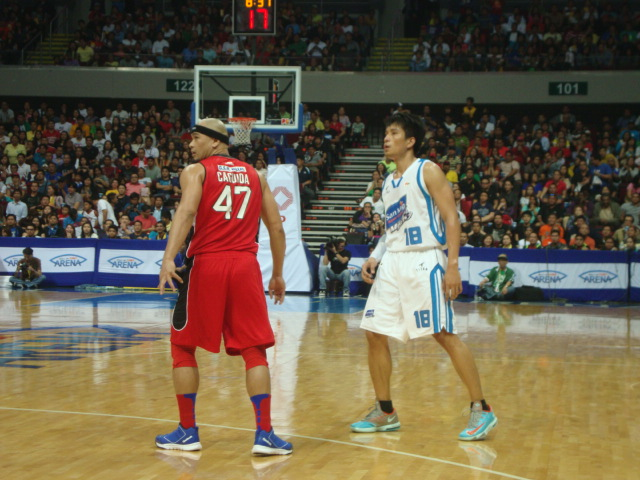
Yap standing beside Mark Caguioa in 2014

The San Mig Coffee Mixers had a slow start in the 2013-14 season; they went 3–7 in the first 10 games of the 2013–14 Philippine Cup and fell 9th in the team standings. However, the team managed to score 4 consecutive wins to end the first round in 5th position. San Mig edged out Talk N' Text 2–1 in the quarterfinals, advancing to the best-of-7 semifinals against Barangay Ginebra San Miguel. After missing a game tying three-pointer in the last few seconds of Game 4, Yap gave the Mixers a 3–2 lead, making a game-winning triple in a 79–76 win. In the crucial Game 7, Yap made dominant clutch plays to lead the team to a 110–87 victory and helping San Mig advance to the finals against Rain or Shine; he scored seven three-pointers and finished the game with 30 points. In the finals, Yap led the San Mig Coffee Mixers to the championship over Rain or Shine, 4–2, after winning Game 6, 93–87. Yap averaged a team-high 13.83 ppg and added averages of 4.33 rpg, 0.50 apg, 0.83 spg and 0.67 bpg.

In the 2014 Commissioner's Cup, Yap and the San Mig Super Coffee team started like a house on fire by winning their first 3 games. However, the team only managed to win another game in their last 6 elimination games as they finished with a 4–5 record, good for 6th place. Due to the team's poor record, they were drawn to face the Alaska Aces in the best-of-three quarterfinal series. After losing the first game to the Aces, the team rebounded to win games 2 and 3 to enter the semifinals against upstart Air 21 Express in a best-of-five affair. In the semifinal series, the Mixers again lost Game 1 to the Express, 103–100 behind the splendid play of forward Sean Anthony. However, in a virtual repeat of their semifinal series against Barangay Ginebra in the Philippine Cup, the Mixers totally dominated the Express in the deciding Game 5 of their series, 99–83, to enter the finals against the undefeated Talk 'N Text Tropang Texters. San Mig Super Coffee drew first blood in the finals with a 15-point victory in Game 1 of the finals, 95–80, in the process snapping the 13–0 romp of the TNT team. After the Tropang Texters evened the series 1–1 with an 86–76 victory in Game 2, San Mig regained the upper hand in the series with a nail-biting 77–75 win in Game 3 from a clutch corner shot by Yap over the outstretched arms of Texters defender, Kelly Williams. The team finished off the Tropang Texters in Game 4 with a 100–91 fightback to win their 3rd straight championship thus joining a select group of PBA teams to win the golden treble. Yap was named the PBA Commissioner's Cup Press Corps Finals MVP.

In April 2014, Yap was voted by fans to start in his 11th All-Star game. He led the PBA All-Stars with 14 points but the team ultimately succumbed to a 93–101 defeat against Gilas Pilipinas.

With the objective of winning a rare Grand Slam, the San Mig Coffee Mixers entered the 2014 Governors' Cup as defending champions, having won the previous year. They ended the elimination round in 4th place with a 5–4 record and clinched a twice to beat advantage in the quarterfinals, where they defeated the returning San Miguel Beermen 97–90. In the semifinals they battled Talk and Text in a best-of-5 series. On June 25, 2014, the two-time MVP scored his 900th career three-point field goal in Game 4 of the semifinals against the Tropang Texters. San Mig prevailed over Talk and Text 3–2, to set up a rematch against Rain or Shine in the 2014 Governors' Cup finals. It was also their fourth straight finals appearance. The Mixers earned a historic grand slam by defeating the Elasto Painters in five games. Despite playing limited minutes and averaging career lows in most statistical categories for much of the season, in the finals, Yap further proved his reputation as a "clutch player" and helped his team win with many crucial shots in multiple games. This championship completed a rare four-peat for the Mixers, as they also won the 2013 PBA Governor's Cup. With such achievement, the Yap-Pingris-Simon trio broke the record for most championships in franchise history with 7, surpassing Alvin Patrimonio's previous record of 6. With the championship in the 2013–14 Governor's Cup, San Mig Coffee recorded the first back-to-back Governor's Cup crowns in 14 years, the first four-peat in 17 years and of course the elusive and rare Grand Slam in 18 years. Yap also received the 2014 Governor's Cup Finals MVP Award with an average of 16.8 ppg (the team-high), his second consecutive Finals MVP award. He ended the season with average of 12.0 points, 37.1 percent shooting, 4.2 rebounds and 1.3 assists.

==== Chasing the title (2014–2016) ====
Starting the 2014–15 season, the San Mig Coffee Mixers was renamed as the Purefoods Star Hotshots. The 2014–15 Philippine Cup, first conference of the season, started in October 2014. On November 23, 2014, Yap became the PBA's 20th all-time scoring leader, surpassing Jeffrey Cariaso (8,935) in a 77–74 win against the Meralco Bolts. In December, Yap was honored as one of the 40 greatest players in PBA history. The Purefoods Star Hotshots struggled in the first games of the Philippine Cup but eventually clinched the quarterfinals with a twice-to-win disadvantage, as they were relegated to seventh place after the elimination round; the team's quest to defend the title ended on December 11, 2014, when they were eliminated by the Meralco Bolts in the first game of the quarterfinals, 77–65. It was the first in 5 times the Hotshots lost a playoff's series to the Bolts.

Purefoods started the 2015 PBA Commissioner's Cup well, going undefeated in their first 4 games. Due to his performances, Yap was elected Player of the Week from February 23 to March 1. The Hotshots took their spot in the quarterfinals by defeating their last opponents Barako Bull Energy and Meralco Bolts, but fell in ranking due to a quotient system and were not given a twice to beat advantage. They faced the Alaska Aces in a best-of-3 series in the quarterfinals, and bagged the semifinals slot by winning two consecutive games. The team faced Talk 'N Text in the semifinals. The Hotshots were able to win Game 1, 94–100, but lost the series as Talk 'N Text won the following 3 matches.

The 2015 PBA Governors' Cup began in May 2015. The franchise was renamed, this time as the Star Hotshots. On May 30, 2015, Yap scored a season-high 23 points against the Kia Sorento, leading his team to an 80–89 win. With a quest to defend their last title, the Hotshots ended the elimination round with a 6–5 record and reached the quarterfinals, where they faced the GlobalPort Batang Pier. The latter was able to clinch a twice to beat in the quarterfinals.

Yap finished the 2014–15 season averaging 11.8 points in 27.9 minutes per game, the lowest since his debut back in 2004.

=== Rain or Shine Elasto Painters (2016–2024) ===
On October 13, 2016, James Yap was sent to Rain or Shine Elasto Painters on a blockbuster trade in exchange for star point guard Paul Lee that led to a shocking reaction from the basketball fans and journalists. The deal was sealed in a meeting between Rain or Shine governor Mert Mondragon and Star officials led by team manager Alvin Patrimonio after Paul Lee and the Elasto Painters failed to lock down a three-year contract extension deal.

In his very first game with the Elasto Painters on November 30, 2016, Yap made two 3-point shots to become the 6th player with at least 1,000 3-point conversions joining Jimmy Alapag, Allan Caidic, Ronnie Magsanoc, Dondon Hontiveros, and Al Solis. However, with his second conversion for the game, he moved to solo 5th in the all-time list with 1,001. As of March 5, 2017, Hontiveros had made 1,133 3-point shots while Yap had 1,020.

On May 25, 2018, during the Luzon leg of the 2018 PBA All-Star Week held in Batangas City, Yap won his second 3-point Shootout trophy after scoring 24 points in the final round outlasting up-and-coming players Stanley Pringle of Globalport and TNT's Terrence Romeo who scored 21 and 16 points respectively. His first 3-point crown was in 2009.

In the 2018 PBA Commissioner's Cup, Yap towed the team to its first-ever semifinal appearance under coach Caloy Garcia where he had a career resurgence winning two Best Player of the Game citations, the first during their quarterfinal series-clinching victory over Globalport where he scored 27 points marked by 7 three-pointers made and the second during Game 2 of their semifinal series with eventual champions Barangay Ginebra San Miguel where he scored 18 points with 3 rebounds.

In March 2019, Yap was voted to his 16th All-Star Game, all as a starter, for the South Team where he will be reunited with former Purefoods Hotdogs teammates PJ Simon and Marc Pingris after his trade to the Rain or Shine team opposite Lee in 2016. His inclusion in the 2019 All-Star Game was continued proof that Yap is still the PBA's biggest star despite his long years in the league.

In the 2019 PBA Philippine Cup, Yap's resurgence is in full display through the team's first eight games as he leads Rain or Shine in scoring with 14.75 points per game, alongside averages of 2.88 rebounds, 1.63 assists, and 0.75 steals. Additionally, Yap won Player of the Week honors for the period February 5–13, 2019 by leading ROS to a 3–0 record on the way to a league-leading 7–1 overall record.

In the 2020 PBA Philippine Cup, Yap moved into a tie for third place in the All-time List for Most 3-point shots converted with 1,171 after going 4/7 in Rain or Shine's game against the TNT Tropang Giga on November 10, 2020. He won Player of the Game honors in this game, an 80–74 victory, that completed the quarterfinal cast of the Philippine Cup PBA Bubble. In their last game in the eliminations against the Phoenix Fuel Masters held on November 11, 2020, Yap drilled a 3-pointer at the 10:58 mark of the third quarter as he officially broke his tie with former PBA great Magsanoc for sole third place in the all-time list as he now has 1,172 3-PT conversions.

On January 23, 2022, Yap signed a contract extension with the team until the end of the 2021 season, but did not play a game as he was officially on a leave of absence due to him pursuing politics.

On January 6, 2023, he officially rejoined Rain or Shine as he signed a one-conference contract. On January 22, he scored 14 points on his first game back since 2021 in a loss to the Meralco Bolts. He was named an All-Star for a record-tying 17th time during the 2023 PBA All-Star Weekend.

On September 26, 2023, he signed another one-conference contract with the team. He was formally released by the team on January 29, 2024.

=== Blackwater Bossing (2024) ===
On February 9, 2024, Yap signed a one-year contract with the Blackwater Bossing.

== PBA career statistics ==
Legend
GP	Games played	MPG	Minutes per game
FG%	Field-goal percentage	3P%	3-point field-goal percentage	FT%	Free-throw percentage
RPG	Rebounds per game	APG	Assists per game	SPG	Steals per game
BPG	Blocks per game	PPG	Points per game	**Bold**	Career high

As of the end of 2023–24 season

Led the league

=== Season-by-season averages ===
Year	Team	GP	MPG	FG%	3P%	FT%	RPG	APG	SPG	BPG	PPG
2004–05	Purefoods	63	27.0	.389	.277	.782	**4.7**	1.0	.5	.3	12.5
2005–06	Purefoods	57	36.4	.400	.343	.780	4.4	1.2	**1.2**	**.4**	17.6
2006–07	Purefoods	41	**38.4**	.405	.340	.781	4.2	1.8	.6	**.4**	19.7
2007–08	Purefoods	50	37.0	.396	.359	**.802**	4.1	1.6	.8	.2	**21.3**
2008–09	Purefoods	36	35.0	.400	.308	.720	4.3	1.6	.8	.3	18.1
2009–10	Purefoods / B-Meg Derby Ace	64	33.9	.396	.302	.701	3.5	2.0	.6	.2	18.0
2010–11	B-Meg Derby Ace	40	36.1	.382	.292	.716	4.3	1.8	.6	**.4**	18.8
2011–12	B-Meg	62	35.2	.381	.296	.683	**4.7**	**2.2**	.5	.3	16.7
2012–13	San Mig Coffee	62	30.8	.358	.294	.644	4.5	1.6	.6	.1	13.3
2013–14	San Mig Super Coffee	**67**	28.5	.371	.308	.655	4.2	1.3	.4	.2	12.0
2014–15	Purefoods / Star	41	27.5	.411	.329	.626	2.8	1.1	.2	.1	11.8
2015–16	Star	29	26.8	.363	.299	.720	2.9	1.3	.2	.1	11.6
2016–17	Rain or Shine	35	20.7	.367	.314	.703	2.9	1.0	.4	.1	9.8
2017–18	Rain or Shine	36	20.6	.390	.363	.735	2.7	1.0	.4	.2	10.3
2019	Rain or Shine	33	22.3	.368	.314	.729	3.2	1.5	.5	.1	11.4
2020	Rain or Shine	11	18.3	.319	.214	.571	2.2	.9	.4	.1	7.2
2021	Rain or Shine	7	16.7	**.431**	.261	.357	2.0	.1	.1	—	7.9
2022–23	Rain or Shine	10	10.0	.396	.286	.667	1.7	.1	—	.1	5.2
2023–24	Rain or Shine	9	8.8	.342	**.476**	.167	1.2	.1	—	.1	4.1
2023–24	Blackwater	9	8.8	.342	**.476**	.167	1.2	.1	—	.1	4.1
Career		753	30.1	.386	.315	.717	3.8	1.4	.6	.2	14.6

== National team career ==
Yap is a many-time member of the RP Basketball Team. Yap was a member of the Philippine National Team that played at the 2003 Southeast Asian Games where they won the basketball gold. He was also a member of the national team that participated at the 2009 FIBA Asia Championship where he played 8 of the 9 games posting averages of 9.3 ppg (74 total points), 2.6 rpg (21 total rebounds) and 0.9 assists (7 total assists). The team ended up in 8th place. In the 2009 Southeast Asia Basketball Association (SEABA) Championships, Yap was a member of the Powerade-Team Pilipinas that won the said tournament, beating Indonesia in the finals, 98–68.

Yap declined the invitation to join the Smart Gilas 2.0 National Team Program including other SMC players like Arwind Santos, Marc Pingris and Alex Cabagnot because of personal reasons.

In 2018, Yap was chosen by coach Yeng Guiao to be part of the Philippine National Team that would play in the 2018 Asian Games to be held at Indonesia alongside five other teammates from his Rain or Shine team in the PBA.

== Player profile ==
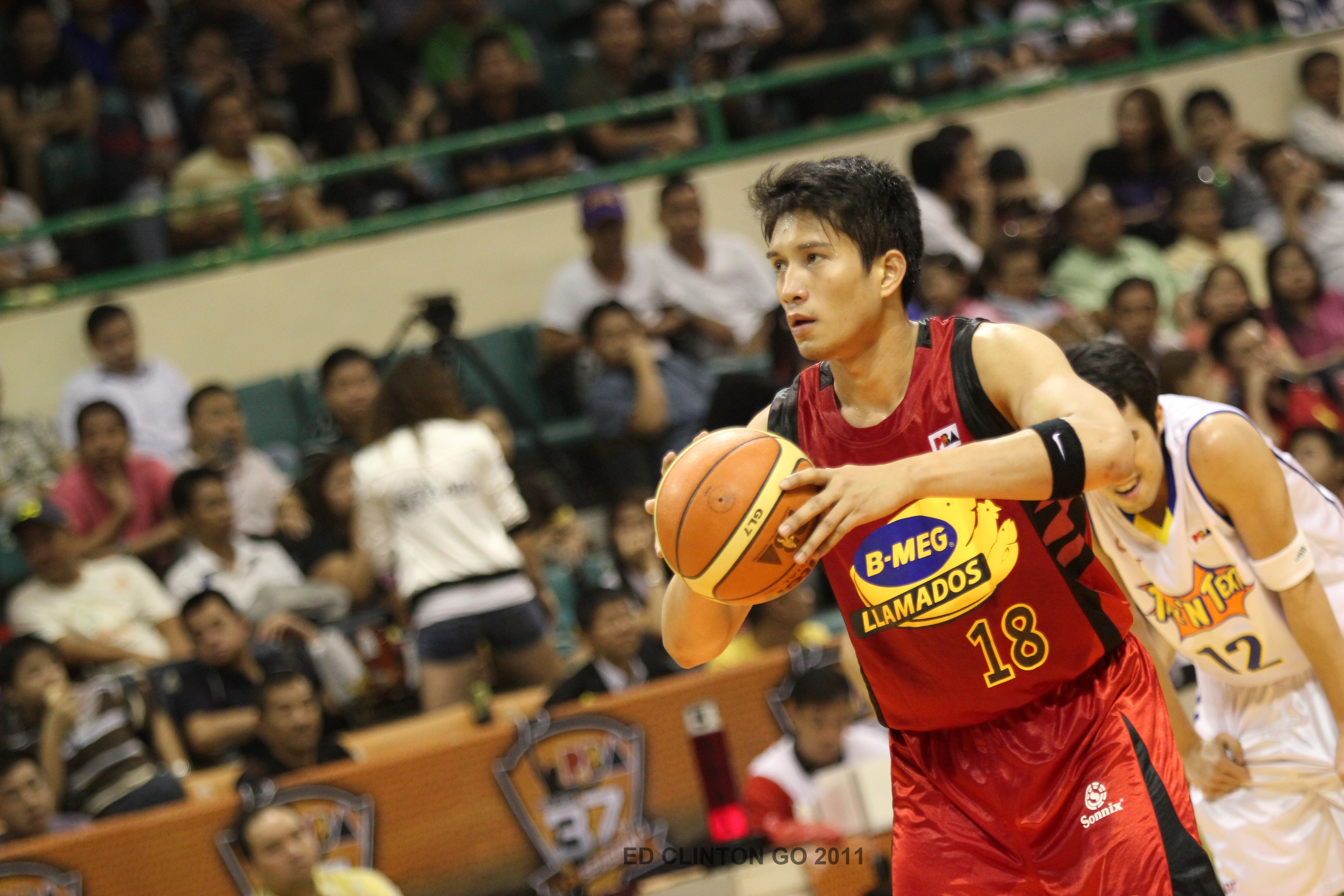
Yap preparing to shoot a free throw in 2012.

Standing at 6 feet 3 inches (1.91 m), Yap plays the shooting guard position, but is also capable of playing small forward. Yap is a player who constantly attacks the basket and is known for his ability to convert difficult layups. He is known for his ability to create shots for himself and is a competent three-point shooter.

In the early part of his career, Yap was considered just a scorer and was rarely seen playing defense. In recent years, aside from his abilities on offense, he has established himself as a standout defender and greatly improved his defense and rebounding. Known by the nickname "Big Game James", Yap has also been noted being one of the premier clutch performers in the PBA, after making many crucial shots during clutch time. His killer crossovers and explosiveness to the basket has earned him the nickname "Man with a Million Moves". Coach Tim Cone has listed Yap as one of the best players he has ever handled, explaining: "I got lot of favorites, but yeah, James of course is one of my favorites. James comes through more than anybody else (when the game demands it). That’s what makes him special, the ability not to get too high or too low. He plays at level of calmness I've never seen in a player before."

== Political career ==
In the 2022 elections, Yap ran for the city council (Sangguniang Panlungsod) of San Juan, Metro Manila. Along with his former Purefoods teammates Paul Artadi and Don Allado, they ran under the ticket of incumbent reelectionist mayor Francis Zamora. Running under PDP–Laban (national party) and Team Makabagong San Juan (local party), Yap garnered 21,427 votes, ranking fourth in the 1st district's six seats. Yap, Artadi, Allado, Zamora, and Ervic Vijandre, all basketball players, were all elected and were dubbed the San Juan "first five," a reference to the starting lineup in basketball.

In 2025, he will run for re-election, this time under Partido Federal ng Pilipinas.

== Personal life ==
Yap is the son of Carlos and Annie Agravante-Yap, the latter of which also originated from Escalante, Negros Occidental.

Yap's first marriage was with actress Kris Aquino. In 2006, both have admitted to having been married as early as mid-2005; the actual date of their marriage was July 10 under civil rites kept unknown to the public. On April 19, 2007, Yap's first son, Bimby Aquino Yap, was born at the Makati Medical Center in Makati. On June 26, 2010, Kris Aquino announced that she had separated from Yap, citing personal reasons. Yap had a second child with a previous undisclosed girlfriend.

Yap is currently in a relationship with Italian Michela Cazzola, with whom he has a son (his third), born on August 8, 2016, in Manila. They had met in late 2011 but did not start dating until August 2012, when they went to Italy together. Yap and Cazzola are practising Catholics and they have baptized their son in the Catholic faith.
