= Baby Dalupan PBA Coach of the Year award =

The Baby Dalupan Philippine Basketball Association (PBA) Coach of the Year Award is an annual Philippine Basketball Association (PBA) award given since the 1993 PBA season. The winner receives the Baby Dalupan Trophy, which is named since 1995 in honor of Dalupan, who won 15 championships in the PBA and led the Crispa Redmanizers to win its first Grand Slam in 1976. Unlike the traditional player awards, which is given by the league, this citation is awarded by the PBA Press Corps.

Since its inception, the award has been given to 13 different coaches. Chot Reyes of TNT Tropang 5G will be receiving his record-extending seventh Coach of the Year award from the PBA Press Corps (PBAPC).

== List of awardees ==
^	Denotes head coach who is still active in the PBA
*	Elected to the PBA Hall of Fame as a coach
*^	Active PBA head coach who has been elected to the PBA Hall of Fame

Season	Coach	Nationality	Team
1993	Chot Reyes^	Philippines	Purefoods TJ Hotdogs
1994	Tim Cone^	United States	Alaska Milkmen
1995	Derrick Pumaren	Philippines	Sunkist Orange Juicers
1996	Tim Cone (2)	United States	Alaska Milkmen
1997	Ron Jacobs	United States	San Miguel Beermen
1998	Perry Ronquillo	Philippines	Formula Shell Zoom Masters
1999	Perry Ronquillo (2)	Philippines	Formula Shell Zoom Masters
2000	Jong Uichico^	Philippines	San Miguel Beermen
2001	Yeng Guiao^	Philippines	Batang Red Bull Thunder
2002	Chot Reyes^ (2)	Philippines	Coca Cola Tigers
2002	Ryan Gregorio	Philippines	Purefoods Tender Juicy Hotdogs
2003	Chot Reyes^ (3)	Philippines	Coca Cola Tigers
2004–05	Siot Tanquincen	Philippines	Barangay Ginebra Kings
2005–06	Ryan Gregorio (2)	Philippines	Purefoods Chunkee Giants
2006–07	Jong Uichico^ (2)	Philippines	Barangay Ginebra Kings
2007–08	Boyet Fernandez	Philippines	Sta. Lucia Realtors
2008–09	Chot Reyes^ (4)	Philippines	Talk 'N Text Tropang Texters
2009–10	Ryan Gregorio (3)	Philippines	B-Meg Derby Ace Llamados
2010–11	Chot Reyes^ (5)	Philippines	Talk 'N Text Tropang Texters
2011–12	Yeng Guiao^ (2)	Philippines	Rain or Shine Elasto Painters
2012–13	Luigi Trillo^	Philippines	Alaska Aces
2013–14	Tim Cone^ (3)	United States	San Mig Super Coffee Mixers
2014–15	Leo Austria^	Philippines	San Miguel Beermen
2015–16	Leo Austria^ (2)	Philippines	San Miguel Beermen
2016–17	Leo Austria^ (3)	Philippines	San Miguel Beermen
2017–18	Chito Victolero	Philippines	Magnolia Hotshots
2019	Leo Austria^ (4)	Philippines	San Miguel Beermen
2020 (Note: The 2020 season only had one conference. A different award, named "Outstanding Coach of the Bubble" was given to Cone.)	Tim Cone^ (4)	Philippines	Barangay Ginebra San Miguel
2021	Chot Reyes^ (6)	Philippines	TNT Tropang Giga
2022–23	Tim Cone^ (5)	Philippines	Barangay Ginebra San Miguel
2023–24	Luigi Trillo^ (2)	Philippines	Meralco Bolts
2023–24	Gene Afable^	Philippines	Meralco Bolts
2023–24	Reynel Hugnatan^	Philippines	Meralco Bolts
2023–24	Sandro Soriano^	Philippines	Meralco Bolts
2023–24	Nenad Vučinić^	Serbia / New Zealand	Meralco Bolts
2023–24	Norman Black^	Philippines	Meralco Bolts
2024–25	Chot Reyes^ (7)	Philippines	TNT Tropang 5G

== Multiple time winners ==
Total	Coach
7	Chot Reyes
5	Tim Cone
4	Leo Austria
3	Ryan Gregorio
2	Yeng Guiao
2	Perry Ronquillo
2	Jong Uichico
