= Onchie dela Cruz =

Filipino basketball player

Onchie Dela Cruz
Personal information
- Born: November 27 Tondo, Manila
- Listed height: 5 ft 11 in (1.80 m)

Career information
- College: PCU
- PBA draft: 1985: 1st round2nd
- Drafted by: Tanduay Rhum Makers
- Playing career: 1985–1994
- Position: Point guard
- Number: 9

Career history
- 1985–1987: Tanduay Rhum Makers
- 1988–1989: Shell Rimula X Diesel Oilers
- 1989–1992: Presto Tivolis / Tivoli Milk Masters / Presto Ice Cream
- 1993–1994: Shell Rimula X
Medals
Men's basketball
Representing Philippines
SEA Games
Gold medal – first place	1983 Singapore	Team
Gold medal – first place	1993 Singapore	Team

Ramon "Onchie" Dela Cruz (born November 27) is a retired Filipino professional basketball player in the Philippine Basketball Association (PBA).

He also took acting roles in various Filipino movies and jobs in the United States, and is now into vlogging mostly in Mega Manila streets, catering to former players and related topics.

== Career ==
After some amateur stints, Dela Cruz began his 10-year professional career as the 2nd overall pick of the Tanduay Rhum Makers in the 1985 PBA Draft. He would later leave Tanduay and play for two other teams in separate years.

Dela Cruz was a four-time PBA champion, played for the Philippine flag, and won gold twice in the Southeast Asian Games.

Dela Cruz was a rough player and, according to him, Jaworski and Rudy Distrito can be likened to him as "enforcers" in the league.
