= John Moran (basketball) =

American basketball coach

Personal information
- Born: 1945/1946

Career history

Coaching
- 1990–1999: Indiana (assistant)
- 2004: Shell Turbo Chargers

John Moran is an American coach who was notable for serving as head coach of Shell Turbo Chargers in the PBA.

== Coaching career ==
A former assistant of Bob Knight at Indiana, Moran was hired as head coach of Shell Turbo Chargers in the PBA, replacing Perry Ronquillo. But due to Basketball Coaches Association of the Philippines' skepticism of hiring non-Filipino coaches for the league, Moran's appointment was expected to be under protest, but the association let Moran coach NBA.

In his PBA coaching career, Moran was noted for benching its rookie Rich Alvarez and only winning once out of first five games. He was later fired and replaced by Leo Austria. Even though, some league key people like Tim Cone and Asi Taulava applauded Moran's offensive system.

After Shell stint, he was rumored to be a consultant for some PBA teams, but it did not materialized.

Moran quoted the following about his offensive system when he was coaching Shell:

I think it’s a system that can make the Philippine team easily beat Korea and Japan. If you’re selfish, you can’t play in that style. In the NBA (National Basketball Association), players have gotten to be too selfish and that’s why they struggle in international competitions against teams like Argentina and Yugoslavia.
