= 1985 PBA draft =

Player selection in Philippine basketball

Overview
- League: Philippine Basketball Association
- First selection: Sonny Cabatu (Shell Azodrin)

The 1985 Philippine Basketball Association (PBA) rookie draft was an event at which teams drafted players from the amateur ranks.

== Round 1 ==
| Pick | Player | Country of origin* | PBA team | College |
|---|---|---|---|---|
| 1 | Sonny Cabatu | Philippines | Shell Azodrin | PSBA |
| 2 | Ramon Dela Cruz | Philippines | Tanduay Rhum | Philippine Christian |
| 3 | Teodicio Alfarero | Philippines | Magnolia Ice Cream | De La Salle |
| 4 | Ranulfo Robles | Philippines | Manila Beer | Letran |
| 5 | Reynaldo Perez | Philippines | Ginebra San Miguel | Mapua |
| 6 | Leandro Isaac | Philippines | Great Taste Coffee | Mapua |

== Round 2 ==
| Pick | Player | Country of origin* | PBA team | College |
|---|---|---|---|---|
| 1 | Romeo Ang | Philippines | Shell Azodrin | Letran |
| 2 | Aldo Perez | Philippines | Manila Beer | De La Salle |

== Round 3 ==
| Pick | Player | Country of origin* | PBA team | College |
|---|---|---|---|---|
| 1 | Menardo Jubinal | Philippines | Shell Azodrin | Mapua |

== Round 4 ==
| Pick | Player | Country of origin* | PBA team | College |
|---|---|---|---|---|
| 1 | Leo Austria | Philippines | Shell Azodrin | Lyceum |

== Round 5 ==
| Pick | Player | Country of origin* | PBA team | College |
|---|---|---|---|---|
| 1 | Manuel Marquez | Philippines | Shell Azodrin | San Beda |

== Undrafted players ==
- Ramon Aquino
- Jerome Cueto
- Ramon Cui
- Artemio Gancayco
- Jesus Ramirez
- Rodel Sy
- Ramon Samson
