= Rene Pardo =

Filipino basketball executive

Career highlights
- As executive: 9× PBA champion (2002 Governors', 2006 Philippine, 2009–10 Philippine, 2012 Commissioner's, 2013 Governors', 2014 Philippine, 2014 Commissioner's, 2014 Governors', 2018 Governors')

Rene Pardo is a Filipino basketball executive. He has served as the board governor for the Magnolia Hotshots, also known as Purefoods, in the PBA since 2004 until 2025, after being replaced by assistant coach Jason Webb. He was the former team manager of the Hotshots from 1999 until 2004.

For the 2010–11 season, Pardo served as the Chairman of the Board of Governors.
