= 1990 PBA expansion draft =

Overview
- League: Philippine Basketball Association
- Expansion teams: Pepsi Hotshots; Pop Cola Sizzlers

The 1990 PBA expansion draft was the first expansion draft of the Philippine Basketball Association (PBA). The draft was held before the start of the 1990 PBA season, so that the newly founded teams Pepsi Hotshots and Pop Cola Sizzlers could acquire players for the upcoming season. A "protect 9" scheme was implemented for the draft, meaning that the six existing PBA teams can protect up to nine players in their rosters and will unconditionally release three players to the expansion pool.

== Key ==
Pos.	G	F	C
Position	Guard	Forward	Center

== Selections ==
Pick	Player	Pos.	Nationality	Team	Previous team	PBA years^{[a]}
1	Tonichi Yturri	C	Philippines	Pepsi Hotshots	San Miguel Beermen	4
2	Elmer Reyes	F	Philippines	Pop Cola Sizzlers	San Miguel Beermen	4
3	Jeffrey Graves	F/C	United States	Pepsi Hotshots	San Miguel Beermen	4
4	Cayetano Salazar	C/F	Philippines	Pop Cola Sizzlers	Añejo Rum 65ers	3
5	Ricky Relosa	F/C	Philippines	Pepsi Hotshots	Alaska Air Force	8
6	Pido Jarencio	G	Philippines	Pop Cola Sizzlers	Purefoods Hotdogs	4
7	Joey Loyzaga	G/F	Philippines	Pepsi Hotshots	Añejo Rum 65ers	6
8	Sonny Cabatu	C	Philippines	Pop Cola Sizzlers	Purefoods Hotdogs	5
9	Harmon Codiñera	C/F	Philippines	Pepsi Hotshots	Añejo Rum 65ers	3
10	Fernando Garcia	G/F	Philippines	Pop Cola Sizzlers	Añejo Rum 65ers	1
11	Alejo Alolor	G/F	Philippines	Pepsi Hotshots	Purefoods Hotdogs	9

== Notes ==
- ^{a} Number of years played in the PBA prior to the draft
