= Rich Alvarez =

Filipino basketball player (born 1980)

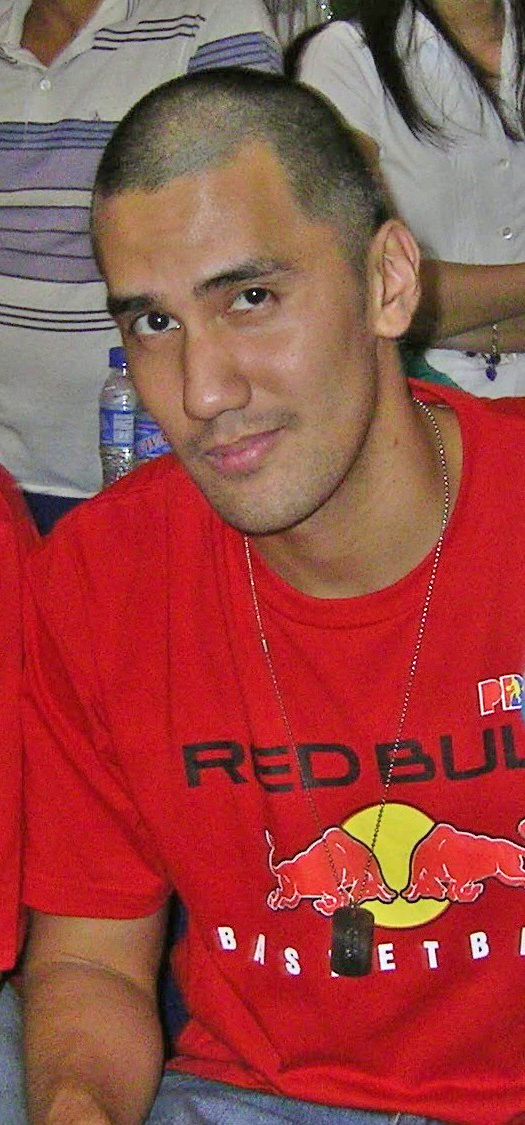
- Alvarez in 2007

Macau Giant Pandas
- Title: Assistant coach
- League: PBA

Personal information
- Born: October 30, 1980 (age 46) Yokosuka, Kanagawa, Japan
- Listed height: 6 ft 4 in (1.93 m)
- Listed weight: 210 lb (95 kg)

Career information
- High school: Nile C. Kinnick High School (Yokohama)
- College: Ateneo
- PBA draft: 2004: 1st round1st overall
- Drafted by: Shell Turbo Chargers
- Playing career: 2004–2016
- Position: Power forward
- Number: 21, 10, 11, 40, 32
- Coaching career: 2016–present

Career history

Playing
- 2004–2005: Shell Turbo Chargers
- 2005–2006: Alaska Aces
- 2006–2008: Red Bull Barako
- 2008–2009: Purefoods Tender Juicy Giants
- 2009–2010: Barangay Ginebra Kings
- 2010: Air21 Express
- 2010–2013: Talk 'N Text Tropang Texters
- 2014–2016: Kia Sorento / Kia Carnival / Mahindra Enforcer

Coaching
- 2016–2018: Mahindra Floodbuster / Kia Picanto (assistant)
- 2019–2020: GenSan Warriors
- 2021: Phoenix Super LPG Fuel Masters (assistant)
- 2021–2022: Rain or Shine Elasto Painters (assistant)
- 2023: GenSan Warriors
- 2025: Basilan Starhorse (assistant)
- 2026–present: Macau Black Bears / Black Knights / Giant Pandas (assistant)

Career highlights
- 4× PBA champion (2011 Philippine, 2011 Commissioner's, 2012 Philippine, 2013 Philippine); PBA All-Star (2004); PBA All-Defensive Team (2005); PBA Rookie of the Year (2005); PBA All-Rookie Team (2005); 2002 PBL Mythical First Team; UAAP champion (2002); 2× UAAP Most Valuable Player (2000, 2001); 4× UAAP Mythical Five (2000, 2001, 2002, 2003); UAAP Defensive Player of the Year (2000)

Richard Alvarez (born October 30, 1980) is a Japanese-born Filipino professional basketball coach and former player who is an assistant coach for the Macau Giant Pandas of the Philippine Basketball Association (PBA). He played his whole career in the Philippine Basketball Association (PBA). He was the first overall pick of 2004 PBA draft by the Shell Turbo Chargers.

== Early life and college career ==
Alvarez grew up in Yokosuka, Japan where he first played for the Nile C. Kinnick High School Basketball Varsity Squad. Shortly, after finishing high school, he flew to the Philippines and attended at Ateneo de Manila University where he became a pivotal part of the Blue Eagles basketball squad. At Ateneo, he was known for his tenacity and hustle plays. Thus, as a sophomore in 2000, he won the coveted UAAP MVP award, beating the likes of King Archer Mike Cortez, fellow Blue Eagle Enrico Villanueva and UST's Cyrus Baguio.

The following year in 2001, he won his second UAAP MVP plum. However, the team still failed to win the championship as the Green Archers established their dynasty in the collegiate ranks courtesy of winning their fourth-straight UAAP championship.

Finally, in 2002, with a stellar supporting cast composed of LA Tenorio, Larry Fonacier, Wesley Gonzales and Gec Chia, he anchored the Blue Eagles to win the title against the heavily favored Green Archers, their first title since 1988.

While in the amateur ranks, he also played for several teams in the Philippine Basketball League, such as Hapee-Nenaco/FASH and Pioneer Insurance. He was also a member of the Philippine national team that competed in the 2003 SEA Games.

== PBA career ==
Alvarez was drafted first overall by Shell Turbo Chargers in the 2004 PBA Draft, ahead of former college rival James Yap. He played his first PBA game on the team's second game after former coach John Moran benched him in the first game. He thought that Alvarez was not yet ready to play, but when Leo Austria took over the team's coaching duties, his game status went up and won the Rookie of the Year honors at season's end. In his rookie season, he averaged 8.8 points and 6.4 rebounds in 72 games.

As the Shell franchise was about to take a leave of absence from the league, he was traded to the Alaska Aces along with Tony dela Cruz, where he struggled in his only appearance with the team during the 2005-06 PBA Fiesta Conference. Prior to the start of the 2006 PBA Philippine Cup, he was traded to the Red Bull Barako in exchange for two 1st-round picks, reuniting him with some of his former teammates in college.

In 2008, he was traded again, this time to Purefoods in exchange for Barako's 2011 first-round pick.

The following year, he was involved into a blockbuster multi-player deal that sent him to the Ginebra Kings.

In 2010, he was traded again, along with Doug Kramer, to Air21 in exchange for Yancy de Ocampo.

As his contract with Air21 expired, he signed with Talk 'N Text prior to start of the 2010–11 PBA season. Initially, he was only signed to a one-conference contract. However, with his valuable contributions off the bench, he stayed with the Tropang Texters until the 2012–13 PBA season. In his last year with the team, he only averaged career-low numbers of 0.4 point, 1.1 rebounds and 0.2 assist in just 20 games.

=== Kia ===
After his stint with Talk 'N Text, he found himself without a team for the entire 2013–14 season. However, when the news broke out that three franchises KIA, Blackwater, and NLEX were accepted as expansion teams in the PBA, he immediately joined the tryouts of Team Kia, and he's out to prove he can still compete. His competitiveness and renewed fervor rewarded him of a spot at Kia Sorento for the upcoming 2014–15 PBA season.

== PBA career statistics ==
Legend
GP	Games played	MPG	Minutes per game
FG%	Field-goal percentage	3P%	3-point field-goal percentage	FT%	Free-throw percentage
RPG	Rebounds per game	APG	Assists per game	SPG	Steals per game
BPG	Blocks per game	PPG	Points per game	**Bold**	Career high

=== Season-by-season averages ===
Year	Team	GP	MPG	FG%	3P%	FT%	RPG	APG	SPG	BPG	PPG
2004–05	Shell	**72**	**28.5**	.419	.331	.542	6.4	**2.4**	**.9**	**.4**	**8.8**
2005–06	Alaska	21	18.5	.364	.154	.550	3.8	1.3	.4	.0	4.3
2005–06	Red Bull	24	15.2	.309	.300	.560	3.4	1.1	.7	.2	3.9
2006–07	Red Bull	55	18.9	**.498**	.167	.585	**10.6**	1.1	.4	.3	5.5
2007–08	Red Bull	23	23.0	.370	.250	.636	3.4	1.1	.7	**.4**	6.6
2008–09	Red Bull	35	17.9	.352	.267	.630	4.1	.7	.4	.3	3.2
2008–09	Purefoods	35	17.9	.352	.267	.630	4.1	.7	.4	.3	3.2
2009–10	Barangay Ginebra	38	14.6	.330	.000	.704	3.0	1.0	.4	.2	2.8
2009–10	Air21	38	14.6	.330	.000	.704	3.0	1.0	.4	.2	2.8
2010–11	Talk 'N Text	34	6.7	.400	—	.667	1.8	.3	.3	.0	1.2
2011–12	Talk 'N Text	22	6.0	.375	—	.455	1.3	.2	.3	.1	.8
2012–13	Talk 'N Text	20	4.2	.308	—	.500	1.1	.2	.1	.1	.5
2014–15	Kia	33	13.2	.405	**.400**	.625	2.9	.8	.6	.3	2.6
2015–16	Mahindra	10	8.5	.250	—	**1.000**	1.7	.4	.3	.1	.8
Career		387	16.8	.404	.276	.588	4.6	1.1	.5	.2	4.3

== Personal life ==
Alvarez began dating R&B singer, Kyla (real name Melanie Calumpad) in 2005. After six years of dating, he proposed in January 2011. Their wedding took place on November 28, 2011. Their son, Toby Elsiah, was born on May 5, 2013.
