= Tony dela Cruz =

Filipino-American basketball player (born 1978)

Personal information
- Born: August 24, 1978 (age 48) West Covina, California, U.S.
- Listed height: 6 ft 5 in (1.96 m)
- Listed weight: 209 lb (95 kg)

Career information
- High school: Carson (Carson, California)
- College: UC Irvine (1996–1998)
- PBA draft: 1999: Direct Hire
- Drafted by: Shell Velocity
- Playing career: 1999–2017
- Position: Small forward / power forward
- Coaching career: 2017–2021

Career history

Playing
- 1999–2005: Shell Velocity / Shell Turbo Chargers
- 2005–2017: Alaska Aces

Coaching
- 2017–2021: Alaska Aces (Assistant)

Career highlights
- 3× PBA champion (2007 Fiesta, 2010 Fiesta, 2013 Commissioner's); PBA Mythical Second Team (2005); PBA Shooting Stars champion (2006); PBA Sportsmanship Awardee (2006); 4x PBA All-Star (2004–2007)

Anthony Bryan Davis dela Cruz (born August 24, 1978) is a Filipino-American former professional basketball player and coach. He played majority of his career for the Alaska Aces of the Philippine Basketball Association (PBA), where he also served as an assistant coach after his playing career. He is also a former member of the RP National Basketball Team.

Born in West Covina, California, Dela Cruz had a stint in the US NCAA and was named as Shell's direct hire recruit in 1999. He became a legitimate PBA All-Star player with the Shell Turbo Chargers and was dealt to the Aces prior to Shell's exit from the PBA before the start of the 2005–2006 season. Following the retirement of former player and now Blackwater Bossing head coach Jeffrey Cariaso in 2010, dela Cruz was named Alaska's team captain.

== Early life and career ==
Dela Cruz was born in West Covina, California, as the middle child with an older sister and a younger sister. His Filipino father was an accountant while his American mother is a former bank analyst. He grew up in Carson, learned basketball at Carson High and then played two years at UC Irvine. In his final season with the UC Irvine Anteaters, he didn't score a point and was only able to attempt one field goal.

== Professional career ==
=== Shell Velocity / Shell Turbo Chargers ===
Dela Cruz joined the 1999 PBA Draft. On December 30, 1999, he was chosen as the Shell Turbo Chargers' Fil-Am direct hire. He signed a three-year deal with the team. In a 2001 Governors' Cup game against the Pop Cola Panthers, he scored seven of his nine points in the fourth quarter and made a clutch steal off Johnny Abarrientos to seal the win.

Dela Cruz gradually increased his scoring in his early seasons, from 6.2 points in 2002, to 14.5 points per game in 2003. During the 2003 All-Filipino Cup, he scored a career-high 32 points in a loss to the Batang Red Bull Thunder. Although they didn't make the playoffs for the conference, he was given a two-year contract worth at least 6.5 million. In 2004, Dela Cruz scored a season-high 28 points in a win over Red Bull. He also added seven rebounds, five assists, and three steals to his totals in that win. He also got to play in his first All-Star game as a replacement for Jeffrey Cariaso.

In the 2004–05 Philippine Cup, Dela Cruz scored 24 points in a win over the Sta. Lucia Realtors. That was their second win of the conference, the team's first winning streak since the 2002 Governors' Cup and it also gave them a 2–1 start to the conference. In that conference, he averaged 18.5 points, won four Player of the Week awards and nearly led Shell to the finals before they were swept by the Talk 'N Text Phone Pals. At the end of the conference, he was given a three-and-a-half-year contract worth P15 million. During the 2005 Fiesta Conference, he, along with 20 other Fil-Ams, were suspended for failure to submit authenticated documents. He was able to return to the team during the playoffs, with his team in the ninth seed. In Game 2 of their wildcard series against fourth seed Sta Lucia, he missed two free throws with 7.5 seconds remaining, but made up for it on defense by pressuring Boyet Fernandez and Shell completed the upset. At the end of the season, he was included on the Mythical Second Team. He was also in the running for the Most Improved Player Award, but lost to Enrico Villanueva.

=== Alaska Aces ===
==== 2005–2007 ====
On August 3, 2005, Dela Cruz was traded to the Alaska Aces along with Rich Alvarez for Rob Duat and Eugene Tejada, as Shell took a leave of absence from the league. Management wanted to trade for him due to his versatility in their system. In a 2005–06 Fiesta Conference game against Red Bull, he made a game-tying three pointer with 4.2 seconds remaining, but then Red Bull import Quemont Greer split his free throws, and that was enough for Alaska to lose the game. He then had a double-double of 16 points and 10 rebounds in a win over the Barangay Ginebra Kings. In a 2006–07 Philippine Cup win over Ginebra, he made clutch free throws that sealed Alaska into fourth place in the standings with a record of 9–7. For the 2005–06 season, he was awarded the PBA's Sportsmanship Award.

In a 2006–07 Philippine Cup win over Red Bull, Dela Cruz scored 18 points to lead Alaska. He then scored 20 points in a win over the Welcoat Dragons. Against the Coca-Cola Tigers, he scored 12 points, but missed a floater in overtime and Coca-Cola's Dennis Miranda made the game-winning three-pointer, which also gave Alaska an 8–11 record. For the 2007 Fiesta Conference, he wasn't able to compete with the team due to being called up for national team duty. Despite his absence, Alaska was able to win the championship.

==== 2007–2010 ====
Dela Cruz started the 2007–08 Philippine Cup with 13 points in a loss to Talk 'N Text. A month later, he scored 16 points in a win over Welcoat. He then scored a season-high 31 points in a loss to Red Bull.

During a 2008–09 Philippine Cup win over the San Miguel Beermen, Dela Cruz scored 15 points. In a win over the Air21 Express, he scored 15 points as they secured the first seed. They reached the finals in that conference, and in Game 1, he contributed 14 points as Alaska won first. However, they would go on to lose the series in seven games. In the 2009 Fiesta Conference, he scored a season-high 20 points in an Alaska win over the Purefoods Tender Juicy Giants. The win was also Tim Cone's 602nd career win, which made him the all-time winningest coach in PBA history.

In a win over Purefoods, Dela Cruz scored eight of his 12 points in the clutch. In a semifinal game against Ginebra during the 2009–10 Philippine Cup, he had a double-double of 16 rebounds and 14 points. From there, they made it to the finals, they were swept by Purefoods. For the 2010 Fiesta Conference, they were motivated to win Alaska its 13th title, as the father of team owner Wilfred Steven Uytengsu Jr. had died, and team captain Jeffrey Cariaso was set to retire at the end of the season. In the playoffs, they fought off Ginebra in the quarterfinals, 3–2, and Talk ‘N Text in the semis, 4–3, to get back into the finals. For Game 6, he was diagnosed with sore eyes and couldn't play. Despite his absence, the team was still able to win the title over San Miguel. At the end of the season, he took over the role of team captain.

==== 2010–2013 ====
During the 2011–12 Philippine Cup, Dela Cruz had his best scoring game in the last four seasons with 23 points on 9-of-17 shooting from the field along with eight rebounds. That season, he suffered a slipped disc injury, which put him out of action until the 2012 Governors' Cup.

In a Game 1 win of their 2012–13 Philippine Cup quarterfinals against the Meralco Bolts, Dela Cruz contributed 13 points as he stepped up for Abueva, who had been ejected from the game. In the 2013 Commissioner's Cup, they beat the San Mig Coffee Mixers 3–1 in the semis. They went on to sweep Ginebra 3–0 to win Alaska its 14th title. In their 2013 Governors' Cup quarterfinals series against the Coffee Mixers, he had more fouls than points, yet Alaska was able to extend the series to a do-or-die game. San Mig eliminated them the following game.

==== 2013–2017 ====
In the 2014–15 Philippine Cup, Alaska reached the finals once again. However, they lost to the Beermen in seven games. In a 2015 Commissioner's Cup game against Meralco, although Dela Cruz didn't score any points, he contributed five rebounds, two blocks, two assists, and one steal in 23 minutes while also limiting Meralco import Andre Emmett to just 24 points on 7-of-24 shooting.

During the 2015–16 Philippine Cup finals, Alaska had a 3–0 lead, yet the Beermen won the next four games to deny Alaska another title. The following conference, the 2016 Commissioner's Cup, Dela Cruz contributed eight points in Game 3 of their playoff match against the Tropang TNT to get Alaska into the semis. In that series, he averaged 6.7 points in 18 minutes. From there, Alaska reached the finals once again, but this time were defeated by the Rain or Shine Elasto Painters 4–2.

In a 2016–17 Philippine Cup loss to the Beermen, Dela Cruz had 15 points. On July 22, 2017, he became the 80th player to score 5,000 points. At the end of the 2016–17 season, he retired. In his final game, a loss to Rain or Shine, he had 12 points on 4-of-7 shooting, six rebounds, and one block without a single turnover. He was never called for a technical foul in his entire career. On June 11, 2018, Alaska honored him with a tribute.

== Career statistics ==
Legend
GP	Games played	MPG	Minutes per game
FG%	Field-goal percentage	3P%	3-point field-goal percentage	FT%	Free-throw percentage
RPG	Rebounds per game	APG	Assists per game	SPG	Steals per game
BPG	Blocks per game	PPG	Points per game	**Bold**	Career high

=== PBA season-by-season averages ===
Year	Team	GP	MPG	FG%	3P%	FT%	RPG	APG	SPG	BPG	PPG
2000	Shell	16	17.2	.329	.200	.833	2.9	.8	.2	.3	4.0
2001	Shell	37	14.5	.374	.250	.611	2.5	.6	.4	.1	3.4
2002	Shell	32	21.3	.422	.295	.684	4.0	1.0	.6	.3	6.2
2003	Shell	35	34.3	.443	**.417**	.716	6.7	2.1	**1.3**	.3	14.5
2004–05	Shell	**71**	**36.7**	.422	.295	.734	6.1	**2.6**	.9	.5	**16.0**
2005–06	Alaska	49	29.5	.394	.167	.760	4.6	1.5	.8	.3	10.1
2006–07	Alaska	21	34.0	**.444**	.111	.667	**7.7**	2.1	.7	.5	11.8
2007–08	Alaska	47	24.5	.407	.363	.796	4.3	.8	.9	.4	8.2
2008–09	Alaska	42	29.1	.432	.403	.729	5.6	1.7	.8	.5	8.7
2009–10	Alaska	61	29.1	.440	.296	.778	5.1	1.7	.8	.4	8.2
2010–11	Alaska	41	27.0	.427	.286	.891	4.7	1.5	1.0	**.6**	7.8
2011–12	Alaska	19	27.9	.397	.222	.727	4.7	1.3	.6	.4	6.6
2012–13	Alaska	54	18.9	.377	.231	**.894**	3.4	1.0	.7	.4	3.4
2013–14	Alaska	42	14.4	.345	.250	.500	2.7	.6	.4	.1	1.6
2014–15	Alaska	52	13.0	.379	.125	.375	2.1	.7	.3	.1	1.6
2015–16	Alaska	43	9.9	.413	.316	.833	2.1	.5	.4	.1	2.4
Career		662	24.1	.416	.308	.743	4.3	1.3	.7	.3	7.4

=== College ===
Year	Team	GP	GS	MPG	FG%	3P%	FT%	RPG	APG	SPG	BPG	PPG
1996–97	UC Irvine	26	0	**12.1**	**.286**	**.429**	**.143**	**1.2**	**.4**	**.2**	**.1**	**.8**
1997–98	UC Irvine	8	0		.000	.000	.000	.5	.0	.0	.0	.0
Career		34	0	12.1	.286	.000	.578	1.1	.3	.2	.1	.8

== National team career ==
In 2004, Dela Cruz made his debut for the Philippine men's national team in the Global Hoops Summit. He also played for the team in that year's Jones Cup.

In 2007, Dela Cruz suffered an ankle injury during the team's campaign in the 2007 FIBA Asia Champions Cup. Due to the injury, he wasn't able to compete in the Southeast Asia Basketball Association (SEABA) men's championship. He was one of the final cuts for the 2007 FIBA Asia Championship, but was a reserve for that team.

== Post-playing career ==
In 2012, while recuperating from an injury, Dela Cruz became an assistant coach under Luigi Trillo for the Cebuana Lhuillier Gems. Soon after retiring from playing, he, along with Eric Altamirano, Danny Ildefonso, and Sean Chambers, joined Alaska's coaching staff under Alex Compton. He left the coaching staff in 2021 to return to the US.

Aside from coaching with Alaska, Dela Cruz also coached high school boys and girls. In 2016, he was one of the assistant coaches for the SLAM Rising Stars Classic, a tournament of the 24 best high school prospects in the country. The following year, he became the head coach. He also coached young boys and girls through the Jr. NBA program.

In 2019, Dela Cruz became an analyst for PBA Rush. He was also one of the analysts for TV5's coverage of SEA Games basketball. He also speaks in motivational seminars as a life coach.

== Personal life ==
Dela Cruz was married to Julie Primero. They have three children, Maya, Marley and Mary Jane. In 2016, Primero filed a divorce lawsuit against him. He is now married to Isabella 'Belay' Fernando, who is currently the team administrator of the Philippines women's national football team.

Dela Cruz is open about his mental health struggles, as he suffers from stress and depression, which he has talked about in motivational seminars. He used to self-medicate, and often drank alcohol. He would also entertain suicidal thoughts, and nearly ended his life in 2013. After that attempt, he opened up about his struggles and began seeing a psychiatrist.
