= Philippine Basketball Association draft =

Annual draft of Basketball players

The Philippine Basketball Association draft is an annual Philippine Basketball Association (PBA) event dating back to 1985 in which the league's teams can draft eligible prospects seeking to join the league. Each team has one draft pick per round to select players and the draft lasts for as many rounds as needed until all teams have passed their selection.

The draft usually takes place between October and December, during the league's off-season. During the early to mid-2020s, due to the COVID-19 pandemic affecting the league's schedule, the draft is scheduled towards the earlier or middle part of the year. No player may sign with any PBA team until he has been eligible for at least one draft.

== Eligibility ==
All players have to be natural-born Filipinos. Persons who chose Philippine citizenship by the age of maturity are considered as natural-born citizens.

The following are the eligibility requirements for local players:

- Entrants who are at least 22 years old on the day of the draft must be at least four years removed from high school or have played one year of college basketball;
- Entrants between the ages of 19 and 21 years must have had at least two years of college education;
- All entrants must be at least 5 feet 6 inches (1.68 m) in height.

Eligibility requirements for Filipino-descended foreigner entrants (Filipino-foreigners) are similar to the locals but with some additions:

- All Filipino-foreigner entrants must be a holder of a Philippine passport.
- All Filipino-foreigner entrants must have previously played professional basketball elsewhere and is not under contract with other teams.

Players who apply for the draft in the fourth or fifth year of eligibility will instead be assigned to a lottery separate from the draft proper. Foreign players, or imports, don't enter the PBA draft. Instead, they are signed directly by teams and only play in conferences which allow imports, such as the Commissioner's Cup and Governors' Cup. Naturalized citizens are classified as imports.

Beginning with the 2027 PBA draft, players who have existing contracts with teams from other leagues cannot declare for the draft. The new condition came as more players were drafted from the Maharlika Pilipinas Basketball League, whose season runs from March to December, and were required to fulfill their contracts with MPBL teams before joining the PBA.

=== Historical requirements ===
From 2015 to 2019, all entrants were also required to play at least seven games across two PBA D-League conferences. Anyone who played for the Philippines men's national basketball team was exempted from this rule and was automatically eligible for the draft. Starting with the PBA season 46 draft in 2021, this requirement was abolished for all players.

Until the season 46 draft, all Filipino-foreigner entrants must have had documents from the Department of Justice and the Bureau of Immigration proving their Philippine citizenship. This clause was repealed later in November that year, abolishing the rule as of the PBA season 47 draft in 2022.

== Order ==
The draft order is determined by the teams' final rankings within each conference from the previous season, with rankings from the Philippine Cup having heavier weight than the import-laden Commissioner's and Governors' Cups. Teams pick in ascending order of the weighted cumulative rankings, with the team with the lowest cumulative ranking picking first while the team with the highest cumulative ranking picking last. The draft order can also change if teams choose to trade their first- or second-round picks to another team.

=== Number of rounds ===
From 1985 to 2004 and since 2011, the PBA draft consists of a minimum of two rounds where teams are required to pick. The draft can go past the second round, but from the third round onwards, teams have the option to pass. Doing so opts the team out for the remainder of the draft. Once all teams have passed, the draft is finished and all undrafted players become free agents.

From 2005 to 2010, the association limited the draft to only two rounds with no selections beyong that point. This restriction was attributed to an agreement between the PBA and the Philippine Basketball League (PBL), which also included a development fee to the PBL team from which the player was drafted. This was removed in 2011 as the PBL had folded, and amateur players played in the PBA D-League instead.

Occasionally, Gilas Pilipinas players may be placed in a special Gilas draft. In 2016, the Gilas draft was held as the first round of that year's draft, but in all drafts since that have the Gilas draft, it is held as a separate round from the draft proper.

=== Draft lottery ===
Before 2015, a draft lottery determined which team gets the first overall draft pick. The lottery involved the two teams with the worst cumulative rankings from the previous season. The team with the worst cumulative ranking had a 2 in 3 chance of clinching the first pick while the second-worst only got a 1 in 3 chance. The lottery was usually held prior to the finals of the final conference of the season. It was abandoned after the controversies that aroused during the lottery for the first pick of the 2014 draft.

== Expansion draft ==
There have been three expansion drafts in the league's history. The first was in 1990, in which the new teams Pepsi Hotshots and the Pop Cola Sizzlers selected up to six players from the expansion pool, which is made up of three players from each of the six existing franchises. The second was in 2000, when newcomers Batang Red Bull Energizers selected players from the draft.

An expansion draft for new teams Blackwater Elite and Kia Sorento was held on July 18, 2014, so that both team can form its rosters for the 2014–15 season. The 10 existing PBA franchises protected up to 12 players in their roster. Two time MVP Danny Ildefonso of the Meralco Bolts was selected as the first pick of the expansion draft by Blackwater, followed by Reil Cervantes of Barako Bull by Kia.

=== Carry-over amateurs ===
If a new franchise also has an existing franchise from an amateur league (from the Philippine Basketball League before 2011 and the PBA D-League afterwards), the franchise, upon approval from the PBA's Board of Governors, may be given an incentive of selecting players from their amateur team to be directly elevated to their PBA team. This was last given to the Welcoat Dragons, who elevated three players from their PBL team.

== List of first overall picks ==
^	Denotes players who have been selected to the Mythical Team
*	Elected to the PBA Hall of Fame
Player (in italic text)	Rookie of the Year
PPG	Points per game (Note: All statistics are taken from the players' respective rookie season unless otherwise noted.)
APG	Assists per game
RPG	Rebounds per game

Flags indicate the country where the player competed as college student-athletes; all players are Filipinos until proven otherwise, like Sonny Alvarado's case where he fled the country as his citizenship was being questioned.

Draft	Player	Selected by	College	Draft venue	PBA rookie statistics			Ref.
Draft	Player	Selected by	College	Draft venue	PPG	RPG	APG	Ref.
1985	Sonny Cabatu	Shell	(Philippines) PSBA (Note: Cabatu previously played for University of Northern Philippines and University of Baguio before PSBA.)		5.2	4.83	0.53	
1986	Rey Cuenco^	Alaska	(Philippines) Arellano		5.4	3.59	0.62	
1987	Allan Caidic*	Great Taste	(Philippines) UE		16.6	3.27	1.9	
1988	Jack Tanuan	Purefoods	(Philippines) FEU		2.6	2.24	0.52	
1989	Benjie Paras* (Note: Paras also won the Most Valuable Player award, the only player as of 2026 to win the award on his rookie year.)	Shell	(Philippines) UP Diliman		25.8	12.98	2.05	
1990	Peter Jao	Great Taste	(Philippines) USJ-R	The Ultra, Pasig	7.8	2.13	1.25	
1991	Alejandro Araneta	Alaska	(Philippines) Ateneo	The Ultra, Pasig	5.2	3.89	0.49	
1992	Vergel Meneses^	Presto-Tivoli	(Philippines) JRC	The Ultra, Pasig	17.69	2.15	1.59	
1993	Jun Limpot^	Sta. Lucia	(Philippines) De La Salle	The Peninsula, Makati	20.6	8.09	2.27	
1994	Noli Locsin^	Tondeña	(Philippines) De La Salle (Note: Locsin studied at St. Benilde while he was playing for De La Salle.)	Manila Hyatt Hotel, Manila	18.5	8.78	2.9	
1995	Dennis Espino^	Sta. Lucia	(Philippines) UST	New World Makati Hotel, Makati	14.7	6.34	1.23	
1996	Marlou Aquino^	Ginebra	(Philippines) Adamson	New World Makati Hotel, Makati	17.9	8.39	1.82	
1997	Andy Seigle	Mobiline	(United States) New Orleans	Glorietta Activity Center, Makati	13.5	9.93	2.29	
1998	Danny Ildefonso^	San Miguel	(Philippines) NU	Glorietta Activity Center, Makati	11.6	5.04	1.58	
1999	Sonny Alvarado^	Tanduay	(United States) Texas	Glorietta Activity Center, Makati	22.9	13.13	3.9	
2000	Paolo Mendoza	Sta. Lucia	(Philippines) UP Diliman	Glorietta Activity Center, Makati	8.0	2.45	2.13	
2001	Willie Miller^	Red Bull	(Philippines) Letran	Glorietta Activity Center, Makati	7.6	2.76	2.29	
2002	Yancy De Ocampo^	FedEx	(Philippines) St. Francis	Glorietta Activity Center, Makati	7.0	5.58	0.36	
2003	Mike Cortez^	Alaska	(Philippines) De La Salle	Glorietta Activity Center, Makati	11.4	4.41	4.2	
2004	Rich Alvarez	Shell	(Philippines) Ateneo	Glorietta Activity Center, Makati	8.8	6.39	2.4	
2005	Jay Washington^	Air21	(United States) Eckerd	Sta. Lucia East Grand Mall, Cainta	5.3	3.66	0.94	
2006	Kelly Williams^	Sta. Lucia	(United States) Oakland	Market! Market!, Taguig	17.3	9.56	1.69	
2007	Joe Devance^	Welcoat	(United States) UTEP	Market! Market!, Taguig	13.6	6.5	1.1	
2008	Gabe Norwood^	Rain or Shine	(United States) George Mason	Market! Market!, Taguig	11.5	7.95	3.27	
2009	Japeth Aguilar^	Burger King	(United States) Western Kentucky (Note: Aguilar played for Ateneo de Manila before playing for WKU.)	Market! Market!, Taguig	10.0	9.0	2.0	
2010	Nonoy Baclao	Air21	(Philippines) Ateneo	Market! Market!, Taguig	3.4	5.2	1.1	
2011	JVee Casio	Powerade	(Philippines) De La Salle	Robinsons Place Manila, Manila	11.9	3.1	6.4	
2012	June Mar Fajardo^	Petron	(Philippines) UC	Robinsons Place Manila, Manila	12.1	9.3	0.6	
2013	Greg Slaughter^	Barangay Ginebra	(Philippines) Ateneo (Note: Slaughter played for the University of the Visayas before playing for Ateneo.)	Robinsons Place Manila, Manila	14.6	10.1	1.5	
2014	Stanley Pringle^	GlobalPort	(United States) Penn State	Robinsons Place Manila, Manila	14.0	5.9	3.8	
2015	Moala Tautuaa	Talk 'N Text	(United States) Chadron State	Robinsons Place Manila, Manila	8.93	4.1	1.24	
2016	No first overall pick (Note: The 2016 draft was composed of two pools: the Gilas pool, which consists of players reserved for the Philippines internationals, and the regular pool. The pick order for the Gilas draft was not revealed and the regular draft started on the second round. Raphael Banal (Hope International University) was selected by Blackwater Elite as the first pick of the regular draft.)			Robinsons Place Manila, Manila	—N/a	—N/a	—N/a	
2017	Christian Standhardinger	San Miguel	(United States) Hawaii	Robinsons Place Manila, Manila	16.59	9.26	1.56	
2018	CJ Perez^	Columbian	(Philippines) Lyceum	Robinsons Place Manila, Manila	20.8	7.39	3.36	
2019	Roosevelt Adams (Note: The 2019 draft was composed of two drafts: the Gilas special draft, which consists of five players reserved for the Philippines national team, and the regular draft. Isaac Go (Ateneo) was selected as the first pick in the special draft. Adams (College of Idaho) was selected by Columbian Dyip as the first pick of the regular draft.)	Columbian	(United States) College of Idaho	Robinsons Place Manila, Manila	10.33	8.11	0.89	
2021 (S46) (Note: Due to the COVID-19 pandemic, the 2020 and succeeding drafts have been held, and its picks were exercised, one year later.)	Joshua Munzon	Terrafirma (Note: The 46th season draft was also composed of two drafts: the Gilas special draft, which consists of players reserved for the Philippines, and the regular draft. Jordan Heading (California Baptist) was selected as the first pick in the special draft. Joshua Munzon (Cal State Los Angeles) was selected by Terrafirma Dyip as the first pick of the regular draft.)	(United States) Cal State Los Angeles	TV5 Media Center, Mandaluyong (draft held via conference call)	19.0	4.33	3.17	
2022 (S47)	Brandon Ganuelas-Rosser	Blackwater	(United States) UC Riverside	Robinsons Place Manila, Manila	12.7	5.7	1.0	
2023 (S48)	Stephen Holt	Terrafirma	(United States) Saint Mary's	Market! Market!, Taguig	17.0	6.9	5.5	
2024 (S49)	Justine Baltazar	Converge	(Philippines) De La Salle	Glorietta Activity Center, Makati	12.2	10.1	2.2	
2025 (S50)	Geo Chiu	Terrafirma	(Philippines) Ateneo	SM Mall of Asia, Pasay				

== By school ==
School	Total
Ateneo	6
De La Salle	4
UP Diliman	2
Others	1 each
