= Perry Ronquillo =

Filipino basketball coach

Personal information
- Born: August 2, 1965 (age 61)

Career information
- College: De La Salle
- Coaching career: 1992–2003

Career history

Coaching
- 1992–1994: Burger Machine
- 1996–1997: Ateneo
- 1995–1998: Formula Shell (assistant)
- 1998–2003: Shell Turbo Chargers/Formula Shell

Career highlights
- As head coach: 2× PBA champion (1998 Governors', 1999 All-Filipino); 2× PBA Coach of the Year (1998, 1999); PBL champion (1993 President Ramos Cup); As player: 2× UAAP champion (1989, 1990)

Perry Ronquillo (born August 2, 1965) is a Filipino former basketball coach. He is now a school teacher in the United States.

== Playing career ==
He played for De La Salle Green Archers under head coach Derrick Pumaren, and won 2 UAAP championships together with PBA future stars Jun Limpot, Dindo Pumaren, future Benilde coach Dong Vergeire, future San Miguel Beermen manager Gee Abanilla, Joey Santamaria, Terrafirma Dyip coach Johnedel Cardel, Tim Cone's brother-in-law Eddie Viaplana and future PBA assistant coach Richard del Rosario.

== Coaching career ==
He coached the Ateneo Blue Eagles for 2 seasons from 1996 until 1997.

He took over as head coach when Chito Narvasa left, and led Formula Shell Turbo Chargers to two consecutive championships becoming the only coach to successively win the Baby Dalupan PBA Coach of the Year trophy in 1998 and 1999.

== Personal life ==
Perry formerly worked as a cash office retail specialist in California.
