= Sonny Cabatu =

Filipino basketball player

Santiago Cabatu Sr.
Personal information
- Born: October 10, 1960 (age 66) Cabugao, Ilocos Sur, Philippines
- Listed height: 6 ft 5 in (1.96 m)
- Listed weight: 205 lb (93 kg)

Career information
- College: UNP; PSBA
- PBA draft: 1985: 1st round1st overall
- Drafted by: Shell Azodrin Bugbusters
- Playing career: 1985–1999
- Position: Center / power forward
- Number: 5, 55

Career history
- 1985-1987: Shell Azodrin Bugbusters
- 1988: Great Taste Milkmasters
- 1989, 1997: Purefoods Hotdogs
- 1990-1991: Diet Sarsi Sizzlers
- 1992-1995: Ginebra San Miguel
- 1998: Cagayan de Oro Nuggets
- 1999: Pasig-Rizal Pirates

Career highlights
- PBA champion (1997 All-Filipino); 3x PABL champion (1984 Ambassador's, 1984 President's, 1984 Invitational's); 2x PABL Most Valuable Player (1984 President's, 1984 Invitational's)
Medals
Men's basketball
Representing Philippines
SEA Games
Gold medal – first place	1983 Singapore	Team

Santiago "Sonny" Cabatu Sr. (born October 10, 1960) is a Filipino retired professional basketball player in the Philippine Basketball Association and was the first draft pick of the league in 1985. He is also the father of current Philippine Patriots player Junjun Cabatu. He also played for the Cagayan de Oro Nuggets and Pasig-Rizal Pirates in the Metropolitan Basketball Association.

== Amateur career ==
Cabatu started his basketball career at the University of Northern Philippines from 1977-1979. Later in 1979, he transferred to the University of Baguio where as a UB Cardinal, he was recruited by Coach Nic Jorge to play for Masagana 99 in 1980. During his stint with M-99, Sonny also enrolled at PSBA and played for the Jaguars in the MUCAA. From Masagana, he has played for Filsyn and Presto in the MICAA. In 1982, he was a member of Crispa's Paul Jordan team under coach Nat Canson, which won the Interclub basketball crown.

In 1984, Cabatu was part of the Development Bank of Rizal team that won the championship of the PABL Ambassador's Cup. After Bank of Rizal disbanded, Sonny went to the national team selection, coached by Larry Albano and sponsored by Country Fair Hotdogs, which competed in the Jones Cup tournament in Taipei. He joined ESQ Marketing midway in the PABL second conference and Sonny made history by winning the Most Valuable Player (MVP) award twice in a row with ESQ capturing the second and third conference championships.

== National team career ==
Cabatu has been a national player twice with the Philippine team to the 1982 Asian Games in New Delhi, India, coached by Nat Canson, and the 1983 Southeast Asian Games in Singapore under coach Larry Albano.

== PBA career ==
Being the professional league's first-ever number one draft pick in 1985, Cabatu was a starting center for newcomer Shell Azodrin. He became a journeyman throughout his pro career, moving to Great Taste and then to Purefoods after three seasons with Shell. In 1990, he was taken by expansion franchise Pop Cola from the expansion pool. Cabatu was traded to Ginebra in 1992 and played four seasons with the ballclub. He was signed by Purefoods as a temporary replacement for the injured Reuben dela Rosa in the 1997 PBA season and at age 36, he finally won his first PBA championship after 12 seasons as the Purefoods Corned Beef Cowboys captured the All-Filipino crown that year.
