= Shell Turbo Chargers =

Philippine basketball team

- Founded: 1985
- Dissolved: 2005
- History: Shell Azodrin Bugbusters (1985); Pilipinas Shell Oilers (1986); Shell Helix Oilers (1986, 1988, 1993); Formula Shell Spark Aiders (1986–1987); Shell Azocord Super Bugbusters (1987); Shell Rimula X Diesel Oilers (1988); Formula Shell Zoom Masters (1989–1990, 1995–1999); Shell Rimula X (1990–1993, 1994–1995); Formula Shell Gas Kings (1995); Shell Velocity (1999–2000); Shell Turbo Chargers (2000–2005)
- Team colors: Green, yellow, black, white
- Company: Shell Pilipinas Corporation
- Head coaches: Freddie Webb, Ed Ocampo, Joe Lipa, Dante Silverio, Arlene Rodriguez, Rino Salazar, Chito Narvasa, Perry Ronquillo, John Moran, Leo Austria, Bobby Parks
- Ownership: Shell Pilipinas Corporation
- Championships: 4 championships 1990 First Conference; 1992 First Conference; 1998 Governors'; 1999 All-Filipino 9 finals appearances
- Retired numbers: 1 (14)
Light uniform	Dark uniform	Alternate

The Shell Turbo Chargers were a Philippine Basketball Association team from 1985 to 2005. It won four PBA championships, two from 1998 to 1999. Shell sold its franchise to PBL team Welcoat Paints in February 2006.

Aside from being known as the Turbo Chargers, Shell was also known as Shell Azodrin Bugbusters, Shell Azocord Super Bugbusters, Shell Oilers, Shell Rimula X, Formula Shell Zoom Masters, Shell Helix Oilers and Shell Velocity.

== History ==
Pilipinas Shell Petroleum Corporation acquired the franchise of the famed Crispa Redmanizers in 1985 for a reported sum of two million pesos. In its debut season, the team was known as Shell Azodrin Bugbusters under head coach Freddie Webb, with several Crispa players, including Philip Cezar and Bernie Fabiosa, in addition to a former Crispa Redmanizer William "Bogs" Adornado from Great Taste and Rey Lazaro from Yco-Tanduay forming its roster. They also had the number one draft pick, Sonny Cabatu, the first ever top overall draft choice in league history. Shell got its first All Filipino finals berth against Great Taste when they defeated Ginebra in a rubber match.

The following season in 1986, Shell carried the name Pilipinas Shell Oilers, Shell Helix and Formula Shell Spark Aiders, respectively, with Olympian Ed Ocampo taking over from Freddie Webb, who resigned as Shell coach midway in the semifinals of the first conference. Shell remained a hard-luck team with national coach Joe Lipa becoming Shell's third coach in 1987 3rd conference, as the team was now known as Shell Azocord Super Bugbusters.

The team's rise to fame came during the late-1980s when they were bannered by two U.P. Diliman standouts Ronnie Magsanoc and Benjie Paras to solidify Shell as one of the more popular teams in the pro league. Former Toyota mentor Dante Silverio was also responsible for transforming Shell to a championship-caliber ballclub with back-to-back runner-up finishes.

Paras is also the only PBA player to win the Rookie of the Year and the coveted Most Valuable Player plum in the same season when the center won it all in 1989.

In the 1990 PBA Open Conference, Shell won its first-ever PBA championship defeating crowd-favorite Añejo Rhum 4–2. But the series was marred by Añejo's infamous walkout in the sixth and final game of the series to award the Shell the win in Game six and the series clincher. At that time, Shell was reinforced by import Bobby Parks, who holds seven Best Import Awards in his PBA career, most of them with the Shell franchise.

A year later, Shell suffered one of the biggest collapses in PBA finals history during the 1991 PBA First Conference, when they blew a 3–1 series lead in the series eventually losing to Ginebra in seven games on a Rudy Distrito game-winner.

Shell won the 1992 PBA First Conference crown but waited six years (20 conferences) before winning another PBA crown, by capturing the 1998 Governor's Cup. They defeated the Mobiline Phone Pals in seven games.

Their final championship came during the 1999 PBA All-Filipino Conference defeating heavy favorite Tanduay Rhum in six games. Shell was bannered by Paras, Gerry Esplana, Victor Pablo, Chris Jackson and Noy Castillo as one of their primary players under head coach Perry Ronquilio.

1999 also became a banner year for Paras, who won his second Most Valuable Player award in his career, despite the arrival of several talented Filipino-foreigner players during the same season. However, injuries in the next three seasons forced Paras to retire after the 2003 season.

Shell suffered several slumps in the next four seasons (2000-2003) before resurfacing during the 2004-2005 season as one of the contenders for the PBA crown. Under head coach Leo Austria (who won the Rookie of the Year honors in 1985 as a player for Shell), the Turbo Chargers placed fourth in the PBA Philippine Cup and third in the season-ending 2005 PBA Fiesta Conference.

== Disbandment ==
During the 2004-05 PBA season, Shell was rumored to be disbanding after the season because its mother company, Royal Dutch Shell in the Netherlands believed it was no longer feasible to continue maintaining its PBA team.

It was believed that port company Harbour Centre was planning to purchase the rights of the Shell franchise. However, both parties did not come into an agreement as Harbour Centre was offering less than what Shell wanted. On August 3, 2005, Shell announced that it was taking a leave of absence from the league. Before the announcement, Shell traded away most of its players. Tony Dela Cruz and Rich Alvarez were dealt to the Alaska Aces while Ronald Tubid was sent to the Air21 Express. The remaining members of the team were selected through the dispersal draft.

Shell was given a six-month deadline for the team to either return to the league in the next PBA season or sell the team to a prospective buyer. In January 2006, PBL powerhouse Welcoat Paints acquired the franchise for and entered the league in the 2006-07 PBA season.

== Awards ==
=== Individual awards ===
PBA Most Valuable Player	Finals MVP	PBA Best Player of the Conference
Benjie Paras - 1989, 1999	Benjie Paras - 1998 Governors'; Gerry Esplana - 1999 All-Filipino	Benjie Paras - 1999 Commissioner's
PBA Rookie of the Year Award	PBA All-Defensive Team	PBA Mythical First Team
Leo Austria - 1985; Benjie Paras - 1989; Rich Alvarez - 2004-05	Philip Cezar - 1985-1986; Biboy Ravanes - 1987; Chris Jackson - 1998-2002; Rich Alvarez - 2004-05	Bogs Adornado - 1985; Benjie Paras - 1989-1991, 1995, 1999; Ronnie Magsanoc - 1990
PBA Mythical Second Team	PBA Most Improved Player	PBA Sportsmanship Award
Philip Cezar - 1985; Ronnie Magsanoc - 1989, 1991-1992; Benjie Paras - 1992, 1994, 1996; Victor Pablo - 1998; Tony Dela Cruz - 2004-05	Mark Telan - 2000	
PBA Best Import		
Bobby Parks - 1988 Reinforced, 1989 Open, 1990 First, 1990 Third, 1991 First, 1992 First; Kenny Redfield - 1996 Commissioner's		

=== PBA Press Corps Individual Awards ===
Executive of the Year	Baby Dalupan Coach of the Year	Defensive Player of the Year
	Perry Ronquillo - 1998-1999	Chris Jackson - 1998-1999, 2001
Bogs Adornado Comeback Player of the Year	Mr. Quality Minutes	All-Rookie Team
Richie Ticzon - 1996; Benjie Paras - 1999	Jun Marzan - 1995; Ronald Tubid - 2004-05	Rich Alvarez - 2004-05

=== All-Star Weekend ===
All Star MVP	All-Star Selection
Benjie Paras - 1994, 1999	1989: Romeo dela Rosa; Ronnie Magsanoc; Benjie Paras; Arnie Tuadles; 1990: Ronnie Magsanoc; Benjie Paras; 1991: Romeo dela Rosa; Ronnie Magsanoc; Benjie Paras; 1992: Ronnie Magsanoc; Benjie Paras; 1993: Ronnie Magsanoc; 1994: Abet Guidaben; Ronnie Magsanoc; Benjie Paras; 1995: Ronnie Magsanoc; Benjie Paras; 1996: Benjie Paras; 1997: Jojo Lim; 1998: John Best; Victor Pablo; 1999: Noy Castillo; Gerry Esplana; Victor Pablo - did not play; Benjie Paras; 2000: Benjie Paras; Mark Telan; 2001: Chris Jackson; 2003: Chris Jackson; 2004: Rich Alvarez; Ronald Tubid
Three-point Shootout	Slam Dunk Contest
Ric-Ric Marata - 1994; Joey Guanio - 1995; Ronald Tubid - 2004	Benjie Paras & Elmer Lago - 1995

== Notable players ==
=== PBA 25 greatest players ===
- William "Bogs" Adornado #33 - played for Shell in its inaugural year
- Philip Cezar #81 & #18 - "The Sultan of Swat"/"The Scholar"/"Mr. Stretch"/"King Philip" played for Shell in its inaugural year
- Bernie Fabiosa #51 & #15- "The Sultan of Swipe"/"Fabulous" played for Shell in its inaugural year
- Abet Guidaben #41 - final team he played before ending his PBA career
- Freddie Hubalde #10 - played for Shell in 1989.
- Ronnie Magsanoc #5 - "The Point Laureate"/"The Navigator" led Shell to two championships, many time All-Star and Mythical team selections
- Benjie Paras #14 - "The Tower of Power" is a 2-time PBA MVP, only player to win the Rookie of the Year and Most Valuable Player in the same season (1989)

=== Other notable players ===
- Dennis Abbatuan #42
- Paul Alvarez #21
- Romeo Ang #10
- Rich Alvarez #10 - 2004-05 Rookie of the Year
- Eric Altamirano #11
- Leo Austria #13 - 1985 Rookie of the Year
- Gido Babilonia #25
- Edwin Bacani #6
- Cris Bade #19 & #10
- Rensy Bajar #7
- Estong Ballesteros #16
- Richard Bognot #24
- Sonny Cabatu #5
- Chris Calaguio #9
- Erick Canlas #16
- Johnedel Cardel #6
- Noy Castillo #4
- Benny Cheng #16
- Pat Codinera
- Tim Coloso #32
- Ed Cordero #3
- Arturo Cristobal #7
- Celino Cruz #1
- Rey Cuenco #9, #25 & #18
- Arthur del Rosario #34
- Onchie dela Cruz #7, #9 & #8
- Tony dela Cruz #35
- Romeo dela Rosa #12
- Allan delos Reyes #16
- Tito Demetrio
- Joel Dualan #19
- Ed Ducut #19
- Brixter Encarnacion #5
- Jolly Escobar #32
- Itoy Esguerra #16
- Carlo Espiritu #77
- Gerry Esplana #30
- Kalani Ferreria #11
- Aris Franco #9
- Allan Garrido #21
- Eric Gascon #9
- Joey Guanio #6
- Abet Gutierrez #3
- Dennis Harrison #1
- Leopoldo Herrera #14
- Mike Hrabak #32
- Freddie Hubalde #19 & #10
- Leo Isaac #9
- Chris Jackson #3
- Elmer Lago #20
- Epoy Jalmasco #6
- Jimmy Javier+ #52
- Menardo Jubinal #11
- Eddie Laure #11
- Rey Lazaro #12
- Marlon Legaspi #29
- Frankie Lim #22
- Alejandro Lim #8
- Joey Loyzaga #17
- Ronnie Lucero #31
- Erwin Luna #11
- Billy Mamaril #2
- Romy Mamaril #4
- Jimmy Manansala #11 & #1
- Manuel Marquez #17 & #71
- Jojo Martin #10
- Porferio Marzan #12
- Ricric Marata #23
- Jay Mendoza #9
- Peter Naron #11
- Romulo Orillosa #28, #22, #68 & #15
- Victor Pablo #33
- Willie Pearson #33
- Giovanni Pineda #24
- Aldo Perez #26
- Jay Ramirez #2
- Biboy Ravanes #6
- Ricky Relosa #15
- Arnorld Rodriguez #6
- Jing Ruiz #8
- Mark Telan #13
- Richie Ticzon #10
- Arnie Tuadles #11
- Calvin Tuadles #33
- Terry Saldaña #17
- Rommel Santos #00 & #31
- Carlo Sharma #27
- Dale Singson #15
- Rainier Sison #18
- Ervin Sotto #30
- Adonis Sta. Maria #16
- Ronald Tubid #8
- Manny Victorino #1
- Rob Wainwright #5 & #33
- Roger Yap #13

=== Imports ===
- Rich Adams #40
- Dwight Anderson #0
- Vincent Askew #30
- George Banks
- Jarvis Basnight #2
- John Best #4 & #25
- Tim Breaux #15
- James Brewer #15
- Luther Burks #21
- Steve Burtt #15
- Howard Carter #32
- Michael Clarke #30
- Steve Colter #30
- Dell Demps #23
- Kevin Graham #32
- Stewart Granger #1
- Derek Grimm #42
- Andy Grosvenor #24
- Carl Harris #12
- Joaquin Hawkins #4
- Johnny Jackson
- Askia Jones #24
- Jamal Kendrick #19
- Jerome Lane #35
- Terrence Lewis #22
- Durand Macklin #40
- Jarvis Matthews
- Jason Matthews #5
- Tharon Mayes #25
- Kenny McClary #33
- Rodney Monroe #23
- Michael Morrison #7 & #2
- John Morton #23
- Lester Neal #24
- Marek Ondera #21
- Bobby Parks #22 & #2
- Dwayne Randall #30
- Kenny Redfield #3
- Fred Reynolds #32
- Melvin Robinson #50
- Lester Rowe #24
- Derrick Rowlands #44
- Dexter Shouse #14 & #21
- Calvin Talford #25
- Calvin Thompson #35
- Kelvin Upshaw #7
- Jameel Watkins #40
- Sedric Webber #23
- Brian Wethers #25
- Ajani Williams #21
- Dennis Williams #20
- Donald Williams #21
- Kevin Williams #7
- Nantambu Willingham #4
- Westly Wilson #33
- Tremaine Wingfield #7
- Perry Young #50

== Coaches ==
- Freddie Webb
- Ed Ocampo
- Joe Lipa
- Dante Silverio
- Arlene Rodriguez
- Rino Salazar
- Chito Narvasa
- Perry Ronquillo
- John Moran
- Leo Austria
- Bobby Parks

== General Managers ==
- Ernesto Inocencio
- Charlie Favis
- Ramon (Mao) Vergel De Dios
- Jimmy Ayson
- Bobby Villarosa
- Bobby Kanapi

Preceded by Crispa Redmanizers	PBA teams genealogies 1985-2005	Succeeded by Welcoat Dragons
