= 1993 PBA Governors' Cup =

- Duration: September 26 – December 14, 1993
- TV partner(s): Vintage Sports (PTV)

Finals
- Champions: San Miguel Beermen
- Runners-up: Swift Mighty Meaty Hotdogs

Awards
- Best Import: Kenny Travis (San Miguel Beermen)

PBA Governors' Cup chronology
- 1994 >

PBA conference chronology
- < 1993 Commissioner's 1994 All-Filipino >

The 1993 Philippine Basketball Association (PBA) Governors' Cup was the third and last conference of the 1993 PBA season. It started on September 26 and ended on December 14, 1993. The tournament is an import-laden format, which requires an import or a pure-foreign player for each team. The tournament features a handicapping rule which allows teams that failed to reach the semifinals for the last two conference to have an import with a 6'6" height limit. The other teams will be allowed with a 6'3" import.

== Format ==
The following format will be observed for the duration of the conference:

- The teams were divided into 2 groups.

Group A:

1. Purefoods TJ Hotdogs
2. San Miguel Beermen
3. Shell Helix Oilers
4. Sta. Lucia Realtors

Group B:

1. Alaska Milkmen
2. Ginebra San Miguel
3. Pepsi Mega Bottlers
4. Swift Mighty Meaty Hotdogs

- Teams in a group will play against each other twice and against teams in the other group once; 10 games per team; Teams are then seeded by basis on win–loss records. Ties are broken among point differentials of the tied teams. Standings will be determined in one league table; teams do not qualify by basis of groupings.
- The top five teams after the eliminations will advance to the semifinals.
- Semifinals will be two round robin affairs with the remaining teams. Results from the elimination round will be carried over. A playoff incentive for a finals berth will be given to the team that will win five of their eight semifinal games.
- The top two teams (or the top team and the winner of the playoff incentive) will face each other in a best-of-seven championship series. The next two teams will play for the best-of-five series for third place.

== Elimination round ==
=== Team standings ===
Pos	Team	W	L	PCT	GB	Qualification
1	San Miguel Beermen	8	2	.800	—	Semifinal round
2	Swift Mighty Meaty Hotdogs	7	3	.700	1	Semifinal round
3	Purefoods Tender Juicy Hotdogs	7	3	.700	1	Semifinal round
4	Pepsi Mega Bottlers	7	3	.700	1	Semifinal round
5	Sta. Lucia Realtors	5	5	.500	3	Semifinal round
6	Alaska Milkmen	4	6	.400	4	
7	Shell Helix Oilers	1	9	.100	7	
8	Ginebra San Miguel	1	9	.100	7	

== Semifinal round ==
=== Team standings ===
Overall standings
Pos	Team	W	L	PCT	GB	Qualification
1	San Miguel Beermen	13	5	.722	—	Advance to the finals (Note: If a team outside the top two teams wins at least five semifinal round games, then it and the second-placed team will playoff for the last finals berth; otherwise, the top 2 teams qualify outright.)
2	Swift Mighty Meaty Hotdogs	11	7	.611 (Note: Second seed playoff: Swift 124–122 Pepsi (2OT))	2	Guaranteed finals berth playoff
3	Pepsi Mega Bottlers	11	7	.611	2	Proceed to third-place playoffs
4	Sta. Lucia Realtors	10	8	.556	3	Qualify to finals berth playoff
5	Purefoods Tender Juicy Hotdogs	9	9	.500	4	

Notes:

Semifinal round standings
Pos	Team	W	L	Qualification
1	San Miguel Beermen	5	3	
2	Sta. Lucia Realtors	5	3	Qualify to finals berth playoff (Note: San Miguel advanced to the finals as the #1 seeded team; finals berth playoff: Swift 130–124 Sta. Lucia)
3	Swift Mighty Meaty Hotdogs	4	4	
4	Pepsi Mega Bottlers	4	4	
5	Purefoods Tender Juicy Hotdogs	2	6	

Notes:

San Miguel qualified for the finals outright after topping the semifinals; Sta. Lucia won five semifinal games to earn themselves a playoff for the other finals berth. However, Swift and Pepsi were tied for the #2 seed. This meant that Sta. Lucia's opponent for the finals berth playoff has to be determined first. The losers of the two playoff games will play for third place.

== Second seed playoff ==
Vintage

November 30

recap

Swift Mighty Meaty Hotdogs 124, Pepsi Mega Bottlers 122 (2OT)

Cuneta Astrodome, Pasay

== Finals berth playoff ==
Vintage

December 3

recap

Swift Mighty Meaty Hotdogs 130, Sta. Lucia Realtors 124

Cuneta Astrodome, Pasay

== Third place playoffs ==
Vintage

December 5

Pepsi Mega Bottlers 79, Sta. Lucia Realtors 93

Cuneta Astrodome, Pasay

Vintage

December 7

recap

Pepsi Mega Bottlers 94, Sta. Lucia Realtors 114

Cuneta Astrodome, Pasay

Vintage

December 10

recap

Pepsi Mega Bottlers 107, Sta. Lucia Realtors 116
Sta.Lucia wins series, 3–0

Cuneta Astrodome, Pasay

== Finals ==
Vintage

December 5

San Miguel Beermen 140, Swift Mighty Meaty Hotdogs 138 (2OT)

Cuneta Astrodome, Pasay

Vintage

December 7

San Miguel Beermen 109, Swift Mighty Meaty Hotdogs 122

Cuneta Astrodome, Pasay

Vintage

December 10

San Miguel Beermen 124, Swift Mighty Meaty Hotdogs 110 (OT)

Cuneta Astrodome, Pasay

Vintage

December 12

San Miguel Beermen 109, Swift Mighty Meaty Hotdogs 104

Cuneta Astrodome, Pasay

Vintage

December 14

San Miguel Beermen 91, Swift Mighty Meaty Hotdogs 89
San Miguel wins series, 4–1

Cuneta Astrodome, Pasay
