= 1993 PBA All-Filipino Cup =

Basketball tournament in the Philippines

- Duration: February 28 – May 18, 1993
- TV partner(s): Vintage Sports (PTV)

Finals
- Champions: Coney Island Ice Cream Stars
- Runners-up: San Miguel Beermen

PBA All-Filipino Cup chronology
- < 1992 1994 >

PBA conference chronology
- < 1992 Third 1993 Commissioner's >

The 1993 Philippine Basketball Association (PBA) All-Filipino Cup was the first conference of the 1993 PBA season. It started on February 28 and ended on May 18, 1993. The tournament is an All-Filipino format, which doesn't require an import or a pure-foreign player for each team.

== Format ==
The following format will be observed for the duration of the conference:

- The teams were divided into 2 groups.

Group A:

1. Coney Island Ice Cream Stars
2. San Miguel Beermen
3. Shell Rimula X
4. Sta. Lucia Realtors

Group B:

1. Alaska Milkmen
2. Ginebra San Miguel
3. 7-Up Uncolas
4. Swift Mighty Meaty Hotdogs

- Teams in a group will play against each other twice and against teams in the other group once; 10 games per team; Teams are then seeded by basis on win–loss records. Ties are broken among point differentials of the tied teams. Standings will be determined in one league table; teams do not qualify by basis of groupings.
- The top five teams after the eliminations will advance to the quarterfinals.
- Quarterfinals will be a single round robin affairs with the remaining five teams. The team with the worst record will be eliminated.
- The four remaining teams will have a best of five semifinal series.
  - SF1: #1 vs. #4
  - SF2: #2 vs. #3
- Best-of-five third-place playoff: losers of the semifinals
- Best-of-seven finals: winners of the semifinals

== Elimination round ==
=== Team standings ===
Pos	Team	W	L	PCT	GB	Qualification
1	San Miguel Beermen	8	2	.800	—	Quarterfinal round
2	Sta. Lucia Realtors	6	4	.600	2	Quarterfinal round
3	Coney Island Ice Cream Stars	6	4	.600	2	Quarterfinal round
4	Swift Mighty Meaty Hotdogs	6	4	.600	2	Quarterfinal round
5	Ginebra San Miguel	5	5	.500	3	Quarterfinal round
6	Alaska Milkmen	4	6	.400	4	
7	7-Up Uncolas	3	7	.300	5	
8	Shell Rimula X	2	8	.200	6	

== Quarterfinal round ==
=== Team standings ===
Pos	Team	W	L	PCT	GB	Qualification
1	San Miguel Beermen	10	4	.714 (Note: Head-to-head record: San Miguel 1–1 Swift; San Miguel +3, Swift −3)	—	Semifinals
2	Swift Mighty Meaty Hotdogs	10	4	.714	—	Semifinals
3	Coney Island Ice Cream Stars	9	5	.643	1	Semifinals
4	Sta. Lucia Realtors	7	7	.500	3	Semifinals
5	Ginebra San Miguel	5	9	.357	5	

=== Results ===
Vintage

April 13

recap

Swift Mighty Meaty Hotdogs 102, Coney Island Ice Cream Stars 96

Cuneta Astrodome, Pasay

Vintage

April 13

Sta. Lucia Realtors 93, Ginebra San Miguel 86

Cuneta Astrodome, Pasay

Vintage

April 16

recap

San Miguel Beermen 119, Ginebra San Miguel 107

Cuneta Astrodome, Pasay

Vintage

April 16

Swift Mighty Meaty Hotdogs 128, Sta. Lucia Realtors 97

Cuneta Astrodome, Pasay

Vintage

April 18

recap

Coney Island Ice Cream Stars 101, Sta. Lucia Realtors 92

Cuneta Astrodome, Pasay

Vintage

April 18

Swift Mighty Meaty Hotdogs 104, San Miguel Beermen 93

Cuneta Astrodome, Pasay

Vintage

April 20

recap

San Miguel Beermen 112, Sta. Lucia Realtors 103

Cuneta Astrodome, Pasay

Vintage

April 20

Coney Island Ice Cream Stars 118, Ginebra San Miguel 105

Cuneta Astrodome, Pasay

Vintage

April 23

recap

Swift Mighty Meaty Hotdogs 109, Ginebra San Miguel 102

Cuneta Astrodome, Pasay

Vintage

April 23

Coney Island Ice Cream Stars 116, San Miguel Beermen 106

Cuneta Astrodome, Pasay

== Bracket ==
Semifinals (Best-of-5)
1	San Miguel	3
4	Sta. Lucia	1
2	Swift	0
3	Coney Island	3

Finals (Best-of-7)
1	San Miguel	2
3	Coney Island	4
Third place playoffs (Best-of-5)
2	Swift	3
4	Sta. Lucia	1

== Semifinals ==
=== (1) San Miguel vs. (4) Sta. Lucia ===
Vintage

April 25

San Miguel Beermen 90, Sta. Lucia Realtors 91

Cuneta Astrodome, Pasay

The realtors completed a stirring comeback from 15 points down in the final five minutes, rookie Max Delantes soared high for a tip-in and then glided in for a fastbreaking layup with a foul from Ato Agustin in the last 20 seconds.

Vintage

April 27

San Miguel Beermen 86, Sta. Lucia Realtors 83

Cuneta Astrodome, Pasay

Hector Calma, Agustin and Allan Caidic took turns in keeping the Beermen intact in the face of the realtors' rally from deficits of as many as 12 points.

Vintage

April 30

San Miguel Beermen 112, Sta. Lucia Realtors 102

Cuneta Astrodome, Pasay

Caidic sizzled with 31 of his 37 points in the second half, as "The Triggerman" unloaded three triples in the third quarter that saw the Beermen taking a 71–61 lead from a 43-all count at halftime.

Vintage

May 2

San Miguel Beermen 121, Sta. Lucia Realtors 105
San Miguel wins series, 3–1

Cuneta Astrodome, Pasay

=== (2) Swift vs. (3) Coney Island ===
Vintage

April 25

~~Swift Mighty Meaty Hotdogs 49, Coney Island Ice Cream Stars 49~~

Cuneta Astrodome, Pasay

Game was canceled due to a brownout experienced in the venue.

Vintage

April 27

Swift Mighty Meaty Hotdogs 86, Coney Island Ice Cream Stars 97

Cuneta Astrodome, Pasay

Coney Island took their first sizeable lead of 10 points, 72–62, going into the final period. Alvin Patrimonio pumped in 22 of his 31 points in the second half.

Vintage

April 30

Swift Mighty Meaty Hotdogs 97, Coney Island Ice Cream Stars 101 (OT)

Cuneta Astrodome, Pasay

Patrimonio knocked in an off-balance jumper with 36.8 seconds left, giving the Stars a 100–97 cushion in the extension period, and completed his heroics by tapping the ball from a driving Nelson Asaytono with six seconds remaining. The stars fell by as many as 20 points in the third period.

Vintage

May 2

Swift Mighty Meaty Hotdogs 126, Coney Island Ice Cream Stars 127 (2OT)
Coney Island wins series, 3–0

Cuneta Astrodome, Pasay

Dindo Pumaren scored six of Coney Island's last eight points in the second overtime as the Stars repulses the Mighty Meaties, despite the absence of Abe King, who was serving a one-game suspension, and Patrimonio, who was ejected with still nine minutes left in the second quarter after figuring in a scuffle with Swift forward Eric Reyes.

== Third place playoffs ==
Vintage

May 7

Swift Mighty Meaty Hotdogs 126, Sta. Lucia Realtors 103

Cuneta Astrodome, Pasay

Vintage

May 9

Swift Mighty Meaty Hotdogs 130, Sta. Lucia Realtors 116

Cuneta Astrodome, Pasay

Vintage

May 11

Swift Mighty Meaty Hotdogs 101, Sta. Lucia Realtors 110

Cuneta Astrodome, Pasay

Vintage

May 14

Swift Mighty Meaties 121, Sta. Lucia Realtors 104
Swift wins series, 3–1

Cuneta Astrodome, Pasay

== Finals ==
Vintage

May 7

San Miguel Beermen 100, Coney Island Ice Cream Stars 90

Cuneta Astrodome, Pasay

Vintage

May 9

San Miguel Beermen 95, Coney Island Ice Cream Stars 104

Cuneta Astrodome, Pasay

Vintage

May 11

San Miguel Beermen 88, Coney Island Ice Cream Stars 94

Cuneta Astrodome, Pasay

Vintage

May 14

San Miguel Beermen 95, Coney Island Ice Cream Stars 96

Cuneta Astrodome, Pasay

Vintage

May 16

San Miguel Beermen 106, Coney Island Ice Cream Stars 91

Cuneta Astrodome, Pasay

Vintage

May 18

San Miguel Beermen 96, Coney Island Ice Cream Stars 99 (OT)
Coney Island wins series, 4–2

Cuneta Astrodome, Pasay
