= 1993 PBA Commissioner's Cup =

- Duration: June 13 - September 7, 1993
- TV partner(s): Vintage Sports (PTV)

Finals
- Champions: Swift Mighty Meaty Hotdogs
- Runners-up: Purefoods Oodles

Awards
- Best Import: Ronnie Thompkins (Swift Mighty Meaty Hotdogs)

PBA Commissioner's Cup chronology
- 1994 >

PBA conference chronology
- < 1993 All-Filipino 1993 Governors' >

The 1993 Philippine Basketball Association (PBA) Commissioner's Cup was the second conference of the 1993 season. It started on June 13 and ended on September 7, 1993. The import-spiced tournament was named after the Commissioner's office when the league change its season-format starting with the All-Filipino as the year's opening show.

== Format ==
The following format will be observed for the duration of the conference:

- The teams were divided into 2 groups.

Group A:

1. Purefoods Oodles
2. San Miguel Beermen
3. Shell Helix Oilers
4. Sta. Lucia Realtors

Group B:

1. Alaska Milkmen
2. Ginebra San Miguel
3. 7-Up Uncolas
4. Swift Mighty Meaty Hotdogs

- Teams in a group will play against each other once and against teams in the other group twice; 11 games per team; Teams are then seeded by basis on win–loss records. Ties are broken among point differentials of the tied teams. Standings will be determined in one league table; teams do not qualify by basis of groupings.
- The top five teams after the eliminations will advance to the semifinals.
- Semifinals will be two round robin affairs with the remaining teams. Results from the elimination round will be carried over. A playoff incentive for a finals berth will be given to the team that will win at least five of their eight semifinal games.
- The top two teams (or the top team and the winner of the playoff incentive) will face each other in a best-of-seven championship series. The next two teams will qualify for a best-of-five playoff for third place.

== Elimination round ==
=== Team standings ===
Pos	Team	W	L	PCT	GB	Qualification
1	Swift Mighty Meaty Hotdogs	9	2	.818	—	Semifinal round
2	Purefoods Oodles	8	3	.727	1	Semifinal round
3	San Miguel Beermen	7	4	.636	2	Semifinal round
4	Shell Helix Oilers	7	4	.636	2	Semifinal round
5	Alaska Milkmen	6	5	.545	3	Semifinal round
6	Ginebra San Miguel	3	8	.273	6	
7	7-Up Uncolas	3	8	.273	6	
8	Sta. Lucia Realtors	1	10	.091	8	

== Semifinal round ==
=== Team standings ===
- Cumulative standings

Pos	Team	W	L	PCT	GB	Qualification
1	Swift Mighty Meaty Hotdogs	15	4	.789	—	Advance to the finals
2	Purefoods Oodles	11	8	.579 (Note: Second-seed playoff: Purefoods 119–101 San Miguel)	4	Advance to the finals
3	San Miguel Beermen	11	8	.579	4	Proceed to third-place playoffs
4	Shell Helix Oilers	10	9	.526 (Note: Head-to-head record: Shell 3–1 Alaska)	5	Proceed to third-place playoffs
5	Alaska Milkmen	10	9	.526	5	

Notes:
- Semifinal round standings:

Pos	Team	W	L
1	Swift Mighty Meaty Hotdogs	6	2
2	San Miguel Beermen	4	4
3	Alaska Milkmen	4	4
4	Purefoods Oodles	3	5
5	Shell Helix Oilers	3	5

== Second seed playoff ==
Vintage

August 24

Purefoods Oodles 119, San Miguel Beermen 101

Cuneta Astrodome, Pasay

== Third place playoffs ==
Vintage

August 27

San Miguel Beermen 133, Shell Helix Oilers 114

Cuneta Astrodome, Pasay

Vintage

August 29

San Miguel Beermen 106, Shell Helix Oilers 100

Cuneta Astrodome, Pasay

Vintage

August 31

San Miguel Beermen 122, Shell Helix Oilers 123

Cuneta Astrodome, Pasay

Vintage

September 3

San Miguel Beermen 134, Shell Helix Oilers 111
San Miguel wins series, 3–1

Cuneta Astrodome, Pasay

== Finals ==
Vintage

August 27

Swift Mighty Meaty Hotdogs 100, Purefoods Oodles 93

Cuneta Astrodome, Pasay

Vintage

August 29

Swift Mighty Meaty Hotdogs 92, Purefoods Oodles 117

Cuneta Astrodome, Pasay

Vintage

August 31

Swift Mighty Meaty Hotdogs 102, Purefoods Oodles 92

Cuneta Astrodome, Pasay

Vintage

September 3

Swift Mighty Meaty Hotdogs 112, Purefoods Oodles 102

Cuneta Astrodome, Pasay

Vintage

September 5

Swift Mighty Meaty Hotdogs 112, Purefoods Oodles 134

Cuneta Astrodome, Pasay

Vintage

September 7

Swift Mighty Meaty Hotdogs 108, Purefoods Oodles 99
Swift wins series, 4–2

Cuneta Astrodome, Pasay
