= Zaldy Realubit =

Filipino basketball player

Personal information
- Born: February 18, 1967 (age 59) Nasipit, Agusan, Philippines
- Listed height: 6 ft 6 in (1.98 m)

Career information
- High school: Northwestern Agusan College (Nasipit, Agusan del Norte)
- College: USJ–R
- PBA draft: 1989: 1st round, 3rd overall pick
- Drafted by: Presto Ice Cream
- Playing career: 1989–2005

Career history

Playing
- 1989–1992: Presto Ice Cream
- 1993: Sta. Lucia Realtors
- 1993–2000: Swift Mighty Meaties / Sunkist Orange Juicers/Bottlers
- 2000–2001: Tanduay Rhum Masters
- 2002: FedEx Express
- 2004–2005: Purefoods

Coaching
- 2015: Pilipinas Aguilas

Career highlights
- 4× PBA champion (1990 All-Filipino, 1993 Commissioner's, 1995 All-Filipino, 1995 Commissioner's); 3× PBA All-Star (1989, 1991, 1992)
Medals
Men's basketball
Representing Philippines
Asian Games
Silver medal – second place	1990 Beijing	Team
SEA Games
Gold medal – first place	1987 Jakarta	Team

Zaldy Realubit (born February 18, 1967) is a Filipino retired professional basketball player who is the current head of operations of the Maharlika Pilipinas Basketball League. He also was the head coach of the Pilipinas Aguilas.

== College and amateur career ==
Realubit hails from Nasipit, Agusan del Norte. He completed his high school at the Northwestern Agusan College but it was at the University of San Jose–Recoletos where he got hooked into basketball under coach Yayoy Alcoseba. Realubit went on to play for Mama's Love in the Philippine Basketball League (PABL) from 1984 to 1985 and RFM-Swifts in his final two years in the amateur league and has blossomed into a fine center.

== Professional career ==
=== Presto ===
Realubit turned professional in 1989 when he was drafted by Presto Ice Cream with the 3rd pick. He played a key role in the franchise' sixth and final championship during the 1990 PBA All-Filipino Conference Finals. Realubit's performance earned him a berth for the all-pro Philippine team to the 1990 Asian Games as a replacement for Jerry Codiñera.

=== Swift / Sunkist ===
After Presto's disbandment at the end of the 1992 PBA season, Realubit moved to newcomer Sta. Lucia Realtors but was traded along with Vergel Meneses to Swift in the following conference. His stint with Swift was highly successful, culminating in Realubit winning three championships with the team, and playing there for six years.

=== Tanduay / FedEx ===
During the 2000 Governors' Cup, Realubit was traded to the Tanduay Rhum Masters in exchange for two second-round picks. In his debut with Tanduay, he made the game-winning follow-up basket in their match against the defending champions San Miguel Beermen. He then followed it up by scoring a career-high 12 points to go along with 13 rebounds in their next win, and was rewarded with a Player of the Week award.

=== Purefoods ===
After leaving FedEx, he signed with the Purefoods Tender Juicy Hotdogs for the 2004–05 season. He played 14 games for the franchise, and retired thereafter.

== International career ==
Realubit first played for the national team in 1986, when he played under coach Joe Lipa. He made it to the RP youth team in early 1987 that placed second to China in the ABC Youth championships held in Manila and sooner with the Philippine men's national team that same year. Realubit also played for the Philippines in the 1990 Asian Games, where they won the silver medal behind China.

== Coaching career ==
Realubit first ventured into coaching after he was selected to coach the Pacquiao Powervit Pilipinas Aguilas that would compete in the 2015–16 ABL season. His stint with the team did not last long, after he resigned just barely two weeks after the season started. He said internal problems, like unpaid wages and player treatment, within the team led to his resignation.

== PBA career statistics ==
Legend
GP	Games played	MPG	Minutes per game
FG%	Field-goal percentage	3P%	3-point field-goal percentage	FT%	Free-throw percentage
RPG	Rebounds per game	APG	Assists per game	SPG	Steals per game
BPG	Blocks per game	PPG	Points per game	**Bold**	Career high

=== Season-by-season averages ===
Year	Team	GP	MPG	FG%	3P%	FT%	RPG	APG	SPG	BPG	PPG
1989	Presto	50	18.1	.514	—	.657	6.1	.3	.1	1.1	7.6
1990	Presto	63	21.1	.547	—	.606	6.2	.4	.1	.5	6.0
1991	Presto / Tivoli	46	30.5	.553	.000	.640	8.8	.7	.1	**1.2**	9.2
1992	Presto	40	—	.525	—	.707	7.2	.7	.1	1.0	8.6
1993	Sta. Lucia	22	**32.6**	.560	—	.591	**11.1**	1.1	.1	.6	9.0
1993	Swift	48	24.8	.560	—	.577	5.7	.7	.1	.6	7.1
1994	Swift	64	21.5	.493	**.667**	.646	5.0	.5	.1	.5	5.6
1995	Sunkist	**71**	18.8	.538	.250	**.760**	4.7	.4	.1	.5	5.0
1996	Sunkist	38	30.1	**.604**	.000	.652	7.9	.4	**.2**	.9	**9.6**
1997	Pop Cola	38	27.8	.600	.000	.722	6.2	.8	**.2**	.7	7.8
1998	Pop Cola	50	17.6	.566	.000	.587	3.6	.6	.1	.4	4.7
1999	Pop Cola	18	23.9	.404	—	.500	5.0	**1.3**	**.2**	.5	4.4
2000	Pop Cola	36	19.5	.321	.000	.643	4.1	.4	.0	.3	2.7
2000	Tanduay	36	19.5	.321	.000	.643	4.1	.4	.0	.3	2.7
2001	Tanduay	34	23.8	.497	—	.656	4.5	.5	**.2**	.3	5.2
2002	FedEx	18	11.1	.171	.143	.733	2.3	.3	.0	.2	1.4
2004–05	Purefoods	14	5.9	.294	—	.500	1.2	.1	.0	.2	.9
Career		650	21.1	.528	.174	.650	5.7	.5	.1	.6	6.2
