= 1993 Alaska Milkmen season =

- Head coach: Tim Cone
- General manager: Joaqui Trillo
- Owner: Fred Uytengsu

All Filipino Cup results
- Record: 4–6 (40%)
- Place: 6th
- Playoff finish: N/A

Commissioner's Cup results
- Record: 10–9 (52.6%)
- Place: 5th
- Playoff finish: Semifinals

Governors Cup results
- Record: 4–6 (40%)
- Place: 6th
- Playoff finish: Eliminated

Alaska Milkmen seasons

The 1993 Alaska Milkmen season was the 8th season of the franchise in the Philippine Basketball Association (PBA).

== Draft picks ==
Round	Pick	Player	College
1	3	Johnny Abarrientos	FEU
1	6	Johnedel Cardel	La Salle
1	8	Richard Bachmann	La Salle

== Summary ==
Alaska lost their first game of the season to Swift, but got an impressive showing from promising rookies Johnny Abarrientos and Johnedel Cardel. The Milkmen had an even 4-4 won-loss card when they were beaten by Sta.Lucia and ousted from the next round by Swift in the All-Filipino Cup. It was the third straight time the Milkmen failed to make past the eliminations.

In the Commissioner's Cup, Alaska's original import choice Richard Coffey, who spent one season with the Minnesota Timberwolves in the NBA, was slated to come, but then decided to back out. Winston Crite, their import from last season, declined to return and Alaska had to settle for Kenny Battle, a first round pick of the Detroit Pistons in 1989 and had stops with four NBA teams. Battle led Alaska all the way into the last day of the semifinal round on August 22 when the Milkmen were locked in a four-way race in a playoff for the second finals berth along with Shell, San Miguel and Purefoods. All four teams carry a 10-8 won-loss card. Alaska lost to Purefoods Oodles, 80-105, in their do-or-die game.

Resident import Sean Chambers played three games for Alaska in the Governor's Cup, leading the Milkmen to an opening day 102-98 win against Ginebra on September 26. The Milkmen lost their next two games and Chambers, hurting on his foot, temporarily given his spot to his recommended Rodney Fuller, who was below six feet and was replaced by Rodney Monroe after four games. Monroe played one game in Alaska's 87-91 loss to Purefoods in Iloilo City on October 23 and a contract dispute led to Monroe leaving. Sean Chambers was back from the injured list and scored a career-high 63 points upon his return as Alaska defeated Ginebra, 130-117 on October 26. The Milkmen were eliminated from the semifinal round when they lost to Swift, 97-100, in their last game on November 2.

== Roster ==
1993 Alaska Milkmen roster
Players

Pos.	#	POB	Name	Height	Weight	DOB (YYYY–MM–DD)	From
G	5	(Philippines)	Gilbert Reyes	5 ft 8 in (1.73 m)			Ateneo
G/F	6	(Philippines)	Jojo Lastimosa	6 ft 0 in (1.83 m)			USJ–R
G	7	(Philippines)	Roehl Gomez	6 ft 0 in (1.83 m)			Cebu
F	9	(Philippines)	Johnedel Cardel	6 ft 0 in (1.83 m)			De La Salle
F	10	(Philippines)	Nandy Garcia	6 ft 2 in (1.88 m)			Adamson
G	12	(Philippines)	Allen Sasan	5 ft 11 in (1.80 m)			Cebu
G	14	(Philippines)	Johnny Abarrientos	5 ft 8 in (1.73 m)			Far Eastern
F	16	(Philippines)	Bong Hawkins	6 ft 3 in (1.91 m)			UPHSD
F	29	(Philippines)	Josel Angeles	6 ft 3 in (1.91 m)			Lyceum
C	32	(Philippines)	Dickie Bachmann	6 ft 5 in (1.96 m)			De La Salle
F/C	34	(Philippines)	Stevenson Solomon	6 ft 4 in (1.93 m)			San Sebastian
C	50	(Philippines)	Alex Araneta	6 ft 6 in (1.98 m)			Ateneo
F	54	(Philippines)	Dondon Ampalayo	6 ft 3 in (1.91 m)			USJ–R

Coaches

Head coach

- (United States) Tim Cone

Assistant coach(es)

- (Philippines) Joel Banal
- (Philippines) Aric del Rosario

Team manager

- (Philippines) Joaquin Trillo

Legend

- (C) Team captain
- Injured

== Transactions ==
=== Trades ===
June 1993	To Sta. Lucia Paul Alvarez	To Alaska Bong Hawkins
August 1993	To Ginebra Bobby Jose	To Alaska Dondon Ampalayo

=== Additions ===
Player	Signed	Former team
Josel Angeles	Off-season	San Miguel
Hernani Demigillo	Off-season	Purefoods

=== Subtractions ===
Player	Signed	New team
Hernani Demigillo	June 1993	Sta. Lucia Realtors

=== Recruited imports ===
Name	Tournament	No.	Pos.	Ht.	College	Duration
Kenny Battle	Commissioner's Cup	3	Forward-Center	6"5'	University of Illinois	June 15 to August 22
Sean Chambers	Governors Cup	20	Forward	6"1'	Cal Poly San Luis Obispo	September 26-October 3, October 26-November 2
Rodney Fuller	Governors Cup	15	Guard-Forward	6"0'	CSU Stanislaus	October 8-19
Rodney Monroe	Governors Cup		Guard	6"1'	North Carolina State	October 23 (one game)
