= Vergel Meneses =

Filipino basketball player

The Honorable Vergel Meneses
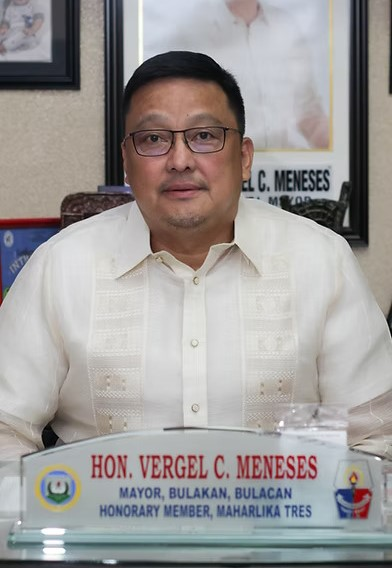
- Official portrait, 2022

Mayor of Bulakan
- Incumbent
- Assumed office June 30, 2019
- Vice Mayor: Patrick Meneses (2019–2022); Aika Sanchez (2022–2025); Aron Ronald Cruz (2025–present)
- Preceded by: Patrick Meneses

Personal details
- Born: January 14, 1969 (age 57) Malolos, Bulacan, Philippines
- Party: NPC (2024–present)
- Other political affiliations: PDP–Laban (2018–2024); Independent (2015–2018)
- Occupation: Athlete, politician
- Basketball career

Personal information
- Listed height: 6 ft 3 in (1.91 m)
- Listed weight: 195 lb (88 kg)

Career information
- College: JRC
- PBA draft: 1992: 1st round1st overall
- Drafted by: Presto Ice Cream
- Playing career: 1992–2006
- Position: Shooting guard / small forward

Career history

Playing
- 1992–1993: Presto Ice Cream
- 1993: Sta. Lucia Realtors
- 1993–1999: Swift Mighty Meaty/Sunkist Orange Juice/Pop Cola Panthers
- 1999–2002: Barangay Ginebra Kings
- 2002–2004: FedEx Express
- 2004–2006: Red Bull Barako
- 2006: Talk 'N Text Phone Pals

Coaching
- 2009–2018: JRU

Career highlights
- 3x PBA champion (1993 Commissioner's, 1995 All-Filipino, 1995 Commissioner's); PBA Most Valuable Player (1995); PBA Most Improved Player (1993); 3x PBA Best Player of the Conference (1994 Governors', 1995 All-Filipino, 1995 Commissioner's); 4x PBA All-Star Game Most Valuable Player (1995, 1998, 2000, 2003); 2x PBA Mythical First Team (1994, 1995); 1x PBA Mythical Second Team (1993); 11× PBA All-Star (1992, 1993, 1994, 1995, 1996, 1997, 1998, 1999, 2000, 2003, 2004); 2x PBA Slam Dunk Champion (1992–1993); PBA Scoring Champion (1996); 50 Greatest Players in PBA History (2000 selection); No. 18 retired by Air21 Express

Vergel Corpuz Meneses (born January 14, 1969) is a retired Filipino professional basketball player and a politician, serving as mayor of the municipality of Bulakan, Bulacan. He previously played in the Philippine Basketball Association for 15 seasons. Known as "The Aerial Voyager" during his playing days, he is also a former PBA Most Valuable Player and a many-time member of the Philippine national team. He was also named to the PBA 25th Anniversary Team.

Meneses then served as the head coach for the JRU Heavy Bombers of the NCAA Philippines from 2009 to 2018. He had played for them in the 1980s. Although they had little success during his playing days, as head coach, he led them to five semifinal appearances.

Meneses entered politics during the 2010s. He first ran for vice mayor of Bulacan, but lost in 2016. He then won three straight terms as mayor of Bulakan.

== Early life and education ==
Meneses learned how to play basketball when he was five years old from his father, who organized barangay basketball leagues. His father offered him ₱100 for every shot he made. He then discovered his talent for dunking and became popular in barangay leagues in Malolos, Bulacan.

In the 1980s, Meneses attended seminary at the Immaculate Conception Seminary in Guiguinto, Bulacan.

== Amateur career ==
In 1986, Meneses began playing for the JRU Heavy Bombers in the National Collegiate Athletic Association (NCAA). In his freshman year, he averaged 22 points per game. He was then invited to compete in the 1987 Philippine Amateur Basketball League (PABL) slam dunk contest, which he won over PABL players, boosting his profile. He played for them until 1989, but was not able to win a championship in his time there.

Meneses continued his amateur career in the PABL. He played for the RFM-Swift Hotdogs. In 1991, Meneses applied for the PBA draft.

== Professional career ==
=== Presto (1992–1993) ===
Meneses was selected first overall by Presto in the 1992 PBA draft. In his first season in the league, during that year's All-Star Weekend, he became the first PBA rookie to win the first-ever Slam Dunk Contest, edging fellow rookie Bong Ravena. He was second in statistical points for Rookie of the Year honors, losing out to Ravena.

=== Sta. Lucia Realtors (1993) ===
In 1992, before the start of the 1993 season, Sta. Lucia Realty acquired the franchise, renaming the team as the Sta. Lucia Realtors. Meneses only played for them in the All-Filipino Cup, contributing to their playoff run as one of the top teams that conference.

=== Swift / Sunkist / Pop Cola (1993–1999) ===
Before the start of the 1993 Commissioner's Cup, Meneses and Zaldy Realubit were dealt to the Swift Mighty Meaty Hotdogs for Jack Tanuan, Ric-Ric Marata and a first round draft pick. This was a reunion for both Meneses and Realubit as they had played for the franchise back when it was still a PABL team. They made it to the finals that conference, where they won in six games over the Purefoods Oodles. He was also named Most Improved Player that season.

During the 1994 All-Filipino Cup, Swift was struggling to get wins. Meneses and the team then made a pact that if they lost another game, they would all shave their heads. They went on to win five straight games and make the semifinals before a loss forced them all to shave their heads. He was an All-Star that season.

In 1995, Meneses led the team, now known as Sunkist, to the All-Filipino Cup finals, where they faced the Alaska Aces. In Game 7, he made a three-pointer then an assist to Yoyoy Villamin to send the game into overtime, where Sunkist was able to clinch the championship. They then won the Commissioner's Cup, putting them in position to complete a Grand Slam. However, in the Governors' Cup, they were eliminated in the semifinals by the Formula Shell Zoom Masters. They won third place in that conference. He won league MVP that season, with a career-high average of 20 points, as well as 3.3 rebounds and 5.4 assists per game.

In 1996, Meneses signed a five-year, ₱28 million contract extension which made him one of the richest players in the league. He made the All-Star team once again in that year and in 1997, playing for the Veterans team that lost both times to the Rookies-Sophomores team.

As a member of the Centennial Team in 1998, Meneses got to play in the All-Star Game. During the Cebu leg, despite having several drinks the morning before the game, he was able to win his second All-Star Game MVP.

During the 1999 All-Filipino Cup, Meneses led all scorers with a career-high 34 points in a win over the Tanduay Gold Rhum Masters.

=== Barangay Ginebra Kings (1999–2002) ===
In the late 90s, Meneses was traded to the Barangay Ginebra Kings for Noli Locsin. In his time with Ginebra, he became a mentor to Mark Caguioa.

In 2002, Meneses expressed his intention to leave the team. Ginebra began looking for offers for Meneses, as they also wanted to offload his salary. He rarely played for the team during the 2002 Commissioner's Cup.

=== FedEx Express (2002–2004) ===
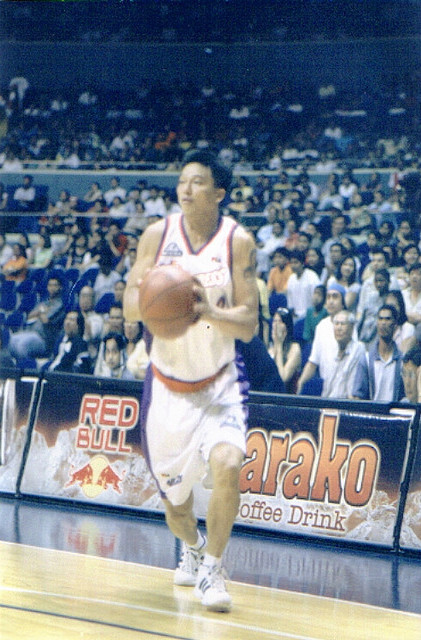
Meneses with Air21

On July 26, 2002, Meneses was traded to the FedEx Express for a 2003 first round pick. He was then signed to a ₱500,000 max contract for two years. Held scoreless in his first game with the team, he then made his veteran presence felt with five points in a clutch win over Sta. Lucia. During the All-Filipino Cup, he scored 34 points in a loss to Purefoods. However, they failed to make the playoffs.

Before the start of the 2003 All-Filipino Cup, Meneses suffered a knee injury which caused him to come off the bench for FedEx's first two games, which were both losses. He then got back into shape, averaging 19 points in his next two games to even out their record to 2–2 while earning a Player of the Week citation. After suffering from a flu before their game against Shell, he scored a season-high 30 points with eight assists for their third straight win, which earned him another Player of the Week award. He was able to win three Player of the Week awards during that conference. Against Purefoods, he made the game-winning assist to Jerry Codiñera that sealed their slot in the quarterfinals while eliminating Purefoods from making the playoffs. During the conference, he was named an All-Star starter that year. He went on to score 27 points during the game, as well as make the game-winning assist to Kenneth Duremdes, capturing his fourth All-Star Game MVP. After the All-Star game, they took on Sta. Lucia, Alaska, and the San Miguel Beermen in the quarterfinal round. During the quarterfinal round, he played through a hamstring injury. That season, he led them in scoring with 15.9 points and was tied for first on the team in assists with 3.0 assists alongside Egay Billones. They were able to win six more games than the previous season overall, and finished sixth overall in win-loss percentage.

During the 2004 Fiesta Conference, Meneses was voted in as an All-Star starter for the North team. He had the second-highest votes among all players.

=== Red Bull Barako (2004–2006) ===
Before the start of the revised 2004–05 season, Meneses was traded by FedEx to the Red Bull Barako in exchange for Homer Se. Reuniting with Yeng Guiao, he then signed with Red Bull for a one-and-a-half year deal. He signed this contract intending for it to be his last contract. However, he missed two months due to back problems. He made his return during the wildcard phase of the Philippine Cup, but Red Bull could not make the quarterfinals. They were able to bounce back the following conference, the Fiesta Conference, and defeat the grand slam-seeking Ginebra in the wild-card round to make the quarterfinals. In Game 2 of the quarterfinals against Alaska, he scored seven of his 10 points in the fourth quarter to force a do-or-die Game 3. Red Bull went on to win that series and make the semifinals. At the start of the 2005–06 season, he found himself on Red Bull's reserve list to make way for Red Bull's young talents.

=== Talk 'N Text Phone Pals (2006) ===
In 2006, Meneses reunited with his former coach Derrick Pumaren with the Talk 'N Text Phone Pals. Playing only eight games with them in the 2006 Philippine Cup, he served in a backup role. He then retired that year. For his career, he finished with career totals of 9,453 points, 1,896 rebounds, and 2,129 assists in 590 games while amassing 19,135 minutes of playing time. He averaged 16 points, 3.2 rebounds, and 3.6 assists per game, making the PBA's 5,000 points and 2,000 assists clubs.

== National team career ==
In 1989, Meneses joined the Under-19 RP Youth Team. He was a member of the team that played in the 1989 Asian Youth Championship held in Manila where the team copped the bronze medal. They then competed in the 1989 SEA Games, where they lost in the final to Malaysia to finish with a silver medal. As an amateur, he played in the 1991 SEA Games. In the final against Thailand, he made a bank shot over two defenders to seal the gold medal for the Philippines.

In 1998, Meneses was part of the Centennial Team that went on to win the 1998 Jones Cup and a bronze medal in the 1998 Asian Games.

== Player profile ==
Meneses was known for his athleticism, able to pull off acrobatic moves to the basket similar to Samboy Lim. In his prime, he was seen as the best isolation scorer in the league. He was also a capable shooter, could score from the post, and could also find open teammates. With his versatility, he could play three positions, including both forward positions and as a center. He was often relied on by his teams for crucial points when games became close.

== Coaching career ==
Meneses first gained coaching experience as an assistant coach of Allan Gregorio for the Burger King team in the PBL in 2009. Later that year, he was appointed as the head coach for the JRU Heavy Bombers. In his first few years he had Derrick Pumaren as his consultant. He made his first Final Four appearance as a coach in 2011.

While coaching JRU, Meneses also became the head coach of the EA Regen Med Regens in the PBA D-League. On August 1, 2013, while continuing to handle JRU, Meneses officially joined the coaching staff of the Air21 Express, formerly known as the FedEx Express, as an assistant coach under Franz Pumaren. Later that year, Air21 retired his #18 jersey during halftime of their game against Barangay Ginebra San Miguel.

In 2014, he was able to lead JRU back into the Final Four. They were eliminated by the Arellano Chiefs that season. After missing the Final Four in 2016, they made it back a year later. In what would be his last season, 2018, they failed to make the playoffs and finished with a 3–15 record. In 2019, he stepped down as head coach to focus on his mayoral campaign.

== Mayoralty ==
Meneses first ran for vice mayor of Bulakan in 2016 as an independent candidate. He lost to incumbent vice mayor Berting Bituin by less than 3,000 votes.

In 2019, Meneses ran for mayor of Bulakan. He won by more than 7,000 votes over his relative Piccolo Meneses. During his first term, the New Manila International Airport began construction. He also led a proactive response to the COVID-19 pandemic, strictly implementing quarantine protocols and distributing food packs.

In 2022, Meneses ran for another term as mayor. In his second term, he implemented a business one stop shop for his constituents.

In 2025, Meneses ran for his third and final term as mayor. He won by more than 6,000 votes.

== Personal life ==
Meneses has two daughters, Via and Roni. Roni, the younger of the two, competed in the 2021 Miss Philippines Earth beauty pageant and currently serving as councilor of Bulakan. He has a brother, Vic, who he played alongside in college. His niece, Ria Meneses, is a volleyball player. He also became a wedding godfather of PBA player Allein Maliksi.

Though not a strict vegetarian, Meneses said he limits himself to a cup of rice every meal and prefers to eat fruits and vegetables. After retiring in 2006, he also kept in shape by playing in exhibition games. He also played with Wang's Basketball, a commercial team, alongside Locsin, Manny Victorino, and Maliksi.

In 2020, while serving as mayor of Bulakan, he tested positive for COVID-19. He was asymptomatic and underwent self-isolation.

== PBA career statistics ==
Legend
GP	Games played	MPG	Minutes per game
FG%	Field-goal percentage	3P%	3-point field-goal percentage	FT%	Free-throw percentage
RPG	Rebounds per game	APG	Assists per game	SPG	Steals per game
BPG	Blocks per game	PPG	Points per game	**Bold**	Career high

Year	Team	GP	MPG	FG%	3P%	FT%	RPG	APG	SPG	BPG	PPG
1992	Presto	39	26.10	.511	.304	.802	2.15	1.59	0.21	0.62	17.69
1993	Sta. Lucia	22	36.82	.538	.333	.822	3.18	3.55	0.27	0.73	18.55
1993	Swift	50	29.74	.583	.305	.762	2.54	2.74	0.22	**0.74**	15.30
1994	Swift	**71**	36.46	**.552**	.209	**.820**	**4.59**	3.10	0.18	0.52	19.56
1995	Sunkist	70	36.93	.500	.325	.788	3.34	5.41	0.31	0.60	**20.03**
1996	Sunkist	37	**39.81**	.469	.275	.764	4.00	**6.65**	**0.70**	0.46	19.59
1997	Pop Cola	38	35.68	.473	**.345**	.782	3.63	5.13	0.42	0.68	17.08
1998	Pop Cola	30	36.60	.484	.280	.698	3.20	4.33	0.33	0.47	17.63
1999	Ginebra	32	38.41	.413	.212	.686	3.66	4.38	0.41	0.31	16.72
2000	Ginebra	32	34.00	.328	.262	.619	3.53	3.38	0.31	0.19	13.34
2001	Ginebra	49	29.71	.407	.322	.674	3.14	3.20	0.27	0.37	11.18
2002	Ginebra/FedEx	22	24.86	.445	.344	.792	2.55	1.86	0.18	0.09	12.41
2003	FedEx	39	29.64	.392	.223	.638	2.82	2.97	0.26	0.41	15.87
2004–05	FedEx/Red Bull	51	22.49	.422	.331	.584	2.02	2.12	0.22	0.10	9.29
2005–06	Talk 'N Text	8	12.00	.300	.143	.500	2.50	1.50	0.12	0.00	2.50
Career		590	32.43	.470	.287	.749	3.21	3.61	0.29	0.46	16.02

== Collegiate record ==
Season	Team	Eliminations					Playoffs				
Season	Team	Finish	GP	W	L	PCT	PG	W	L	PCT	Results
2010	JRU	3rd	16	12	4	.750	2	1	1	.500	Stepladder round 2
2011	JRU	4th	18	9	9	.500	1	0	1	.000	Semifinals
2012	JRU	5th	18	10	8	.556	1	0	1	.000	4th-seed playoff
2013	JRU	8th	18	6	12	.333	–	–	–	–	Eliminated
2014	JRU	3rd	18	12	6	.667	2	1	1	.500	Semifinals
2015	JRU	4th	18	12	6	.667	2	0	2	.000	Semifinals
2016	JRU	5th	18	9	9	.500	–	–	–	–	Eliminated
2017	JRU	3rd	18	11	7	.622	1	0	1	.000	Stepladder round 1
2018	JRU	10th	18	3	15	.167	–	–	–	–	Eliminated
Totals			160	84	76	.525	9	2	7	.222	0 championships

== Achievements ==
=== Philippine Basketball Association ===
- PBA Commissioner's Cup champion (1993, 1995) and PBA All-Filipino Cup champion (1995)
- Most Valuable Player (1995)
- 3-time Best Player of the Conference (1994 Governors Cup, 1995 All-Filipino Cup, 1995 Commissioners Cup)
- 2-time Mythical First Team Selection (1994, 1995)
- Mythical Second Team Selection (1993)
- 4-time All-Star Game MVP (1995, 1998, 2000, 2003)
- 11-time All-Star (1992, 1993, 1994, 1995, 1996, 1997, 1998, 2000, 2003, 2004; in 1999, he was voted as a starter but failed to play due to an injury)
- Most Improved Player (1993)
- 2-time Slam Dunk Champion (1992, 1993)
- PRO Basketball Player of the Year (PSA Awards and SCOOP Awards in 1995)
- Member of the PBA's 25, 40, and 50 Greatest Players
- Member, 5,000 point club
- Member, 2,000-assists club
- President's Award (2022)

=== Philippine Basketball League ===
- Member of the PBL's 12 Greatest Legacy Team (2000)
- Member of the PBL's Top 20 Players of All-Time (2003)
- PABL Slam Dunk champion (1987)

=== Philippine national team ===
- 1989 Asian Youth Championship, Bronze Medal (Manila, Philippines)
- 1989 South East Asian Games, Runner-up (Kuala Lumpur, Malaysia)
- 1991 South East Asian Games, Champion (Manila, Philippines)
- 1998 William Jones Cup, Champion (Taipei, Taiwan)
- 1998 Asian Games, Bronze Medal (Bangkok, Thailand)
