= Jun Limpot =

Filipino basketball player

Personal information
- Born: December 14, 1971 (age 54) Surigao del Sur, Philippines
- Listed height: 6 ft 6 in (1.98 m)

Career information
- College: De La Salle
- PBA draft: 1993: 1st round1st overall
- Drafted by: Sta. Lucia Realtors
- Playing career: 1993–2007
- Position: Power forward / center
- Number: 72, 9
- Coaching career: 2016–2022

Career history

Playing
- 1993–1999: Sta. Lucia Realtors
- 2000–2003: Barangay Ginebra Kings
- 2004–2007: Purefoods Chunkee/TJ Giants

Coaching
- 2013–2022: De La Salle (assistant)

Career highlights
- As player: PBA champion (2006 Philippine); 2x PBA Mythical Second Team (1993, 1997); PBA All-Defensive Team (1993); 5x PBA All-Star (1993–1995, 1999, 2004); PBA Rookie of the Year (1993); PBA Scoring Champion (1994); 2x UAAP Champion (1989, 1990); 3x UAAP Most Valuable Player (1989, 1990, 1992); As coach: UAAP champions (2013, 2016)

Zandro P. Limpot Jr. (born December 14, 1971), also known as Jun Limpot, is a Filipino former professional basketball player in the Philippine Basketball Association (PBA).

== Playing career ==
As a De La Salle Green Archer, Limpot led his team to two UAAP basketball titles (1989 and 1990). He shares the record of being a 3-time UAAP Most Valuable Player.

He then played for Magnolia Ice Cream in the PBL for four years from 1989 to 1993. He led the team to four conference championships and he won a PBL Most Valuable Player Award in the process.

Aside from that, he also was part of the national basketball team of the Philippines that won the Gold Medal at the 1991 Manila SEA Games. This then led Limpot to be the PBA's most sought-after amateur in the 1993 PBA Draft.

He was drafted 1st overall by the Sta. Lucia Realtors, where he averaged 20.6 points, 8.1 rebounds, 2.3 assists and 1.6 blocks in 39.8 minutes per game as a rookie. Limpot was the Rookie of the Year and spent 7 years with the Sta. Lucia franchise before being traded to the Barangay Ginebra Kings in 2000 for Marlou Aquino.

He was also a member of the national basketball team of the Philippines that participated at the 1998 Asian Games.

In 2004, he was traded to the Purefoods TJ Hotdogs where he won his only PBA championship in 2006. He then retired at the end of the 2006-07 season.

== PBA career statistics ==
Legend
GP	Games played	MPG	Minutes per game
FG%	Field-goal percentage	3P%	3-point field-goal percentage	FT%	Free-throw percentage
RPG	Rebounds per game	APG	Assists per game	SPG	Steals per game
BPG	Blocks per game	PPG	Points per game	**Bold**	Career high

=== Season-by-season averages ===
Year	Team	GP	MPG	FG%	3P%	FT%	RPG	APG	SPG	BPG	PPG
1993	Sta. Lucia	**55**	39.8	.514	.214	.760	8.1	2.3	.6	1.6	20.6
1994	Sta. Lucia	39	41.0	.475	.346	.830	7.6	**3.1**	.4	**1.8**	**22.0**
1995	Sta. Lucia	48	37.8	**.520**	.139	.806	6.5	1.8	.6	1.2	19.8
1996	Sta. Lucia	31	37.4	.512	.125	.778	6.5	1.5	.5	.9	18.1
1997	Sta. Lucia	**55**	38.4	.504	.250	.865	6.8	2.5	.6	.7	20.3
1998	Sta. Lucia	33	41.6	.427	.281	.856	**8.2**	2.6	**.7**	.7	18.9
1999	Sta. Lucia	38	39.4	.450	.207	.767	7.3	1.9	**.7**	.8	15.5
2000	Barangay Ginebra	36	**41.9**	.426	.348	.751	6.6	1.8	.3	.4	16.5
2001	Barangay Ginebra	52	40.5	.486	.300	.856	6.2	2.4	.5	.7	16.0
2002	Barangay Ginebra	19	26.7	.424	.385	**.875**	4.3	1.5	.2	.1	10.9
2003	Barangay Ginebra	31	31.5	.450	**.407**	.873	5.5	1.1	.3	.3	15.5
2004–05	Purefoods	53	25.6	.436	.250	.800	4.1	1.2	.2	.2	11.7
2005–06	Purefoods	42	15.9	.477	.105	.789	2.2	.3	.2	.2	6.1
2006–07	Purefoods	26	17.1	.472	.286	.818	2.0	.8	.2	.2	7.4
Career		558	34.6	.476	.262	.814	6.0	1.8	.4	.8	20.3

== Personal life ==
Limpot is married to Adrianne Escudero.
