= 1993 Sta. Lucia Realtors season =

- Head coach: Nat Canson
- Owner: Zipporah Realty

All Filipino Cup results
- Record: 9–13 (40.9%)
- Place: 4th
- Playoff finish: Semifinals

Commissioner's Cup results
- Record: 1–10 (9.1%)
- Place: 8th
- Playoff finish: Eliminated

Governor's Cup results
- Record: 13–9 (59.1%)
- Place: 3rd
- Playoff finish: Semifinals

Sta. Lucia Realtors seasons

The 1993 Sta. Lucia Realtors season was the 1st season of the franchise in the Philippine Basketball Association (PBA).

== Draft picks ==
Round	Pick	Player	College
1	1	Zandro Limpot	La Salle
3	17	Max Delantes	University of Visayas

== New team ==
The Sta. Lucia Realtors, a realty firm who had a basketball team that won two titles in the Philippine Basketball League (PBL), formalized its entry to the pro league by taking over the defunct Presto franchise. The new ballclub absorbed five players from Presto: Gerry Esplana, Bong Hawkins, Peter Jao, Vergel Meneses and Zaldy Realubit. The Realtors got the biggest catch in the amateur draft, choosing multi-titled national team player Zandro "Jun" Limpot from De La Salle in the UAAP, and Magnolia in the PBL as the number one overall pick. They also acquired another national team member, Boyet Fernandez, who played for the ballclub in the amateurs, but was originally picked by Swift in the annual draft.

== Notable dates ==
February 28: Sta. Lucia defeated the Benjie Paras-less Shell Turbo Chargers in a rousing debut, 112-91, in the opening game of the season at the newly built Cuneta Astrodome.

March 7: The Realtors scored their third victory without a loss by upsetting the highly favored San Miguel Beermen, 88-80.

March 12: Sta.Lucia remained unbeaten in the All-Filipino Cup with their fourth win against 7-Up, winning by one point, 95-94.

November 9: The Realtors outlasted the San Miguel Beermen, 135-129, in a triple-overtime for their second straight win in the Governors Cup semifinals. Sta. Lucia rookie Jun Limpot played a total of 60 minutes.

November 14: Sta. Lucia completed their first round semifinal assignment by winning over Purefoods for the first time in the season, 123-116.

November 21: The Realtors clinched the win-five incentive and a playoff for the second finals berth by repeating over Purefoods, 120-117.

== Award ==
Top draft pick Zandro Limpot was honored as the season's Rookie of the Year.

== Roster ==
1993 Sta. Lucia Realtors roster
Players

Pos.	#	POB	Name	Height	Weight	DOB (YYYY–MM–DD)	From
G/F	8	(Philippines)	Peter Jao	5 ft 11 in (1.80 m)			USJ–R
C	9 & 72	(Philippines)	Jun Limpot	6 ft 5 in (1.96 m)			De La Salle
G	11	(Philippines)	Boyet Fernandez	5 ft 9 in (1.75 m)			San Agustin
G	14	(Philippines)	Gerry Esplana	6 ft 0 in (1.83 m)			Far Eastern
C	15	(Philippines)	Hernani Demigillo	6 ft 5 in (1.96 m)			San Sebastian
G/F	17	(Philippines)	Edgar Macaraya	5 ft 10 in (1.78 m)			San Sebastian
G/F	22	(Philippines)	Ricky Cui	6 ft 2 in (1.88 m)			Lyceum
G	23	(Philippines)	Ric-Ric Marata	5 ft 8 in (1.73 m)			Southwestern-U
G	27	(Philippines)	Melchor Teves	6 ft 2 in (1.88 m)			San Sebastian
F	30	(Philippines)	Paul Alvarez	6 ft 0 in (1.83 m)			San Sebastian
C	41	(Philippines)	Jack Tanuan	6 ft 5 in (1.96 m)			Far Eastern
F	50	(Philippines)	Maximo Delantes	6 ft 2 in (1.88 m)			Visayas
F	62	(Philippines)	Alejandro De Guzman	6 ft 2 in (1.88 m)			Far Eastern
F/C	93	(Philippines)	Vilmer Banares	6 ft 3 in (1.91 m)			UE

Coaches

Head coach

- (Philippines) Nat Canson

Assistant coach(es)

- (Philippines) Joshua Villapando
- (Philippines) Adonis Tierra

Team manager

- (Philippines) Buddy Encarnado

Legend

- (C) Team captain
- Injured

== Transactions ==
=== Trades ===
June 1993	To Swift #18 Vergel Meneses, #35 Zaldy Realubit	To Sta. Lucia Andy De Guzman, Jack Tanuan, Ric-Ric Marata
June 1993	To Alaska #12 Bong Hawkins	To Sta. Lucia Paul Alvarez

=== Additions ===
Player	Signed	Former team
Vilmer Banares	June 1993	Swift
Hernani Demigillo	June 1993	Alaska

=== Subtractions ===
Player	Signed	New team
#13 Peter Aguilar	June 1993	Shell
#20 Rudy Enterina	October 1993	Ginebra

=== Recruited imports ===
Name	Tournament	No.	Pos.	Ht.	College	Duration
Mike McGee	Commissioner's Cup	4	Center-forward	6"5'	University of Michigan	June 13-29
Nikita Wilson	Commissioner's Cup	30 & 34	Center-forward	6"4'	Louisiana State University	July 2-30
Terrance Bailey	Governors Cup	11	Forward-guard	6"1'	Wagner College	September 26 (one game)
Lambert Shell	Governors Cup	42	Guard-forward	6"2'	University of Bridgeport	October 1 to December 10
