= Olsen Racela =

Filipino basketball player and coach

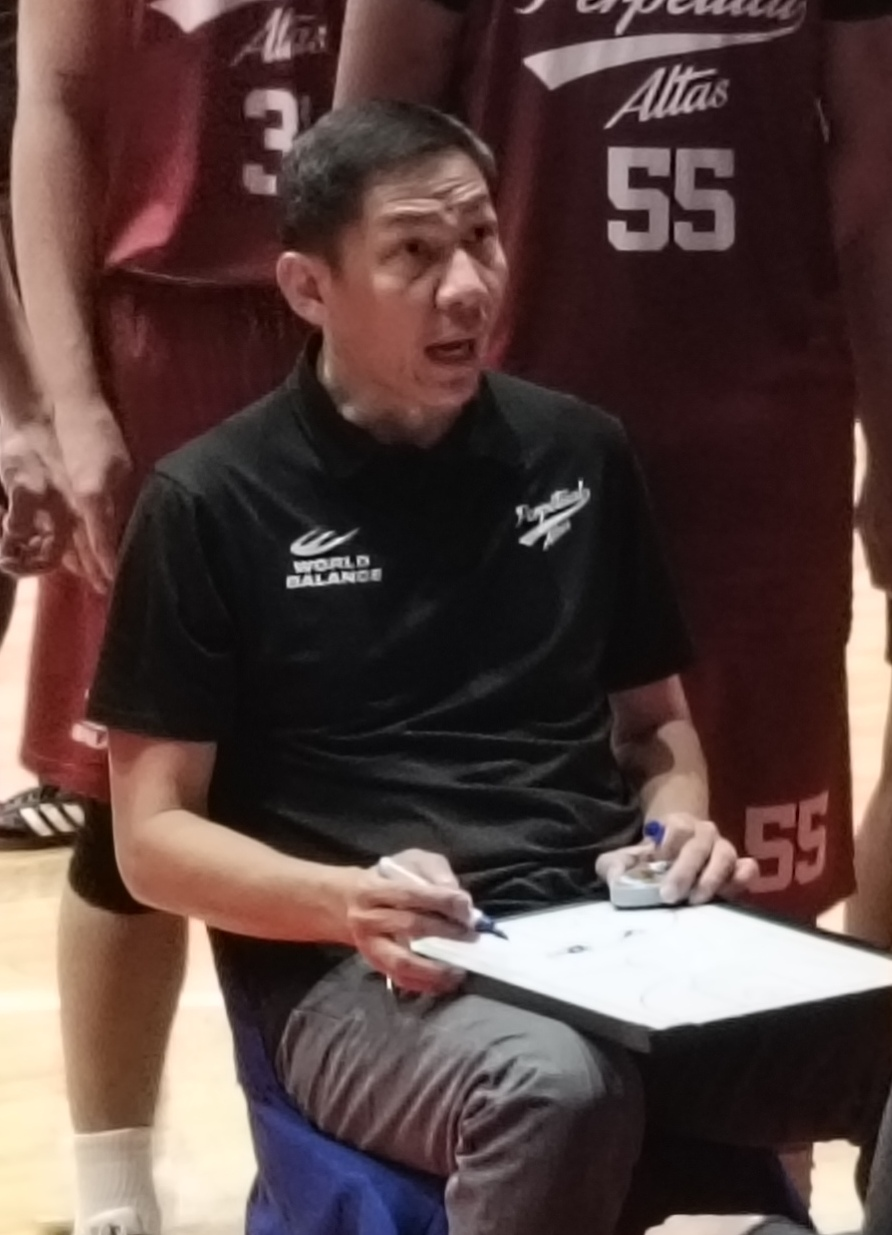
- Racela in 2025

Perpetual Altas
- Title: Head coach
- League: NCAA

Personal information
- Born: November 1, 1970 (age 56) Quezon City, Philippines
- Listed height: 5 ft 11 in (1.80 m)
- Listed weight: 165 lb (75 kg)

Career information
- College: Ateneo
- PBA draft: 1993: 2nd round, 12th overall pick
- Drafted by: Coney Island Ice Cream Stars
- Playing career: 1993–2011
- Position: Point guard
- Number: 17
- Coaching career: 2011–present

Career history

Playing
- 1993–1996: Coney Island Ice Cream Stars/Purefoods Oodles Flavor Noodles/Purefoods Tender Juicy Hotdogs/Purefoods Corned Beef Cowboys
- 1997–2011: San Miguel Beermen/Magnolia Beverage Masters

Coaching
- 2011–2012: San Miguel Beermen/Petron Blaze Boosters (assistant)
- 2012–2013: Petron Blaze Boosters
- 2013–2014: San Mig Coffee Mixers/San Mig Super Coffee Mixers (assistant)
- 2014–present: Barangay Ginebra San Miguel (assistant)
- 2016–2022: FEU
- 2024–present: Perpetual

Career highlights
- As player: 9× PBA champion (1993 All-Filipino, 1994 Commissioner's, 1999 Commissioner's, 1999 Governors', 2000 Commissioner's, 2000 Governors', 2001 All-Filipino, 2005 Fiesta, 2009 Fiesta); 6× PBA All-Star (2000, 2001, 2003–2006); 2× PBA Mythical First Team (2000, 2001); 3× PBA Mythical Second Team (1998, 1999, 2004-05); PBA Mr. Quality Minutes (1993); No. 17 retired by the San Miguel Beermen; 2× UAAP Champion (1987, 1988); As assistant coach: 11× PBA champion coach (2013 Governors', 2013–14 Philippine, 2014 Commissioner's, 2016 Governors', 2017 Governors', 2018 Commissioner's, 2019 Governors', 2020 Philippine, 2021 Governors', 2022–23 Commissioner's, 2026 Commissioner's); As head coach: Father Martin Cup Summer Tournament Champion (2019)
Medals
Men's basketball
Representing Philippines
Asian Games
Bronze medal – third place	1998 Bangkok	Team
William Jones Cup
Gold medal – first place	1998 Taipei	Team

Rodericko Cesar "Olsen" Escueta Racela (born November 1, 1970) is a Filipino coach and former player. He is both the head coach for the Perpetual Altas in the NCAA, and is an assistant coach for the Barangay Ginebra San Miguel of the Philippine Basketball Association (PBA). He played for 18 seasons during his PBA career. He was also a notable member of the Philippine national basketball team on many occasions.

== Early life ==
Olsen Racela, born on November 1 in Quezon City, Philippines, was so named because he was born on All Saint's Day (his brother Nash was born on Bonifacio Day). As a young boy, he started playing basketball early in his life. It was just a simple game for Olsen back then, which consisted of a couple of shots through a hoop in his old neighborhood. Among his brothers, he proved to have the prodigious basketball skills which gave him a spot in Ateneo de Manila University's varsity team.

== Amateur career ==
Racela played for the Ateneo Blue Eagles in a backup role to Jun Reyes and was a member of the Blue Eagles team that won the UAAP title in 1988. He also played in the Philippine Amateur Basketball League and the RP Youth Team.

== PBA career ==
=== Purefoods ===
In 1993, Racela was selected 14th by Purefoods in the 1993 PBA Rookie Draft. From 1993 to 1996, he played the backup role to Dindo Pumaren and won two titles with the Purefoods franchise under a limited role with the team.

=== San Miguel Beermen ===
In 1997, Racela was traded to the San Miguel Beermen for merely two second round picks for the succeeding three years beginning 1998. This became the turnaround of his young career. Under new San Miguel head coach Ron Jacobs, Racela's skills were noticed under a rebuilding Beermen squad of Nelson Asaytono, Freddie Abuda and Mike Mustre.

In 1998, Racela's game would improve and was rewarded with a spot on the Tim Cone-coached Philippine Centennial Team that took home a bronze medal in the 1998 Asian Games in Bangkok, Thailand. A season later, with Racela as its top point guard, San Miguel became the league's new dynasty under Jong Uichico, winning five titles from 1999 to 2001.

=== 2002 Busan Asiad ===
He made his second stint in the national team in 2002 for the Asian Games in Busan, South Korea. With Racela as point guard, the Nationals made it all the way through the semifinals against host South Korea. In the final minute, Racela scored a three-pointer to give the Philippines the lead. However, after recovering the possession and was fouled, he missed two crucial free throws that could have given the country a four-point lead. Instead, Lee Sang Min's buzzer-beating triple gave the Koreans a dramatic 69-68 victory. Some argued that the blame rested on Jong Uichico's coaching strategy in which he did not set up a plan to ease Racela's pressure from the 15 foot line.

Despite the missed free-throws, Racela continued to shine in his point guard duties with San Miguel. In 2004, he dished his 2,000th career assist and was the starting point guard when the Beermen won another title in the 2005 PBA Fiesta Conference.

Starting in the 2007-08 All Filipino Conference, Racela occasionally played off the bench in preparation for his retirement and later life as an assistant coach.

On August 11, 2010, Racela became the fifth player alongside Ramon Fernandez, Robert Jaworski, Abet Guidaben & Philip Cezar to play at least 900 games in the PBA.

=== League's oldest active player and retirement ===
After PBA legend Johnny Abarrientos announced his retirement, Racela played for another season with San Miguel. He turned 40 on November 1, 2010, and was the senior statesman of the PBA during that season. He announced his retirement on January 28, 2011, at the Araneta Coliseum at the start of Game 4 of the finals. He had played the entire finals series before he hanged up his #17 jersey in which Talk 'N Text Tropang Texters subdued San Miguel Beermen in 6 games.

== PBA career statistics ==
Legend
GP	Games played	MPG	Minutes per game
FG%	Field-goal percentage	3P%	3-point field-goal percentage	FT%	Free-throw percentage
RPG	Rebounds per game	APG	Assists per game	SPG	Steals per game
BPG	Blocks per game	PPG	Points per game	**Bold**	Career high

=== Season-by-season averages ===
Year	Team	GP	MPG	FG%	3P%	FT%	RPG	APG	SPG	BPG	PPG
1993	Coney Island / Purefoods	43	8.3	**.514**	.333	.700	.9	1.3	.4	.1	3.4
1994	Coney Island / Purefoods	62	15.6	.479	**.444**	.661	.9	1.5	.4	.1	3.7
1995	Purefoods	59	24.8	.502	.222	.851	1.7	3.1	**1.2**	.1	6.7
1996	Purefoods	58	22.6	.454	.115	.795	1.5	3.0	.8	.1	6.4
1997	San Miguel	62	**40.0**	.439	.316	.876	1.8	4.7	.7	.1	**11.4**
1998	San Miguel	49	38.2	.455	.292	.847	2.8	4.5	1.1	**.2**	8.8
1999	San Miguel	53	34.2	.399	.233	.843	2.3	3.6	.8	.1	7.3
2000	San Miguel	58	32.9	.461	.383	.839	2.3	3.0	.6	.1	9.6
2001	San Miguel	70	34.3	.395	.381	.871	2.2	2.8	.8	.0	10.9
2002	San Miguel	12	26.2	.384	.294	.800	1.9	4.6	.9	**.2**	9.7
2003	San Miguel	50	32.5	.417	.373	.865	**3.0**	4.8	1.1	.1	10.8
2004–05	San Miguel	**78**	34.0	.398	.354	.827	2.2	**5.3**	1.1	.1	**11.4**
2005–06	San Miguel	43	32.6	.367	.305	.863	2.7	4.3	1.1	.1	8.3
2006–07	San Miguel	62	26.3	.373	.286	.872	2.3	3.5	1.0	.1	8.5
2007–08	Magnolia	47	20.0	.426	.391	**.912**	1.6	2.5	.6	.1	6.3
2008–09	San Miguel	56	20.0	.387	.327	.828	1.9	3.2	.6	.0	6.0
2009–10	San Miguel	39	11.0	.393	.328	.833	.8	1.2	.6	.0	3.2
2010–11	San Miguel	24	12.0	.344	.303	.875	.8	1.7	.3	.0	3.0
Career		925	27.0	.419	.334	.841	1.9	3.3	.8	.1	7.8

== Coaching career ==
On December 20, 2016, FEU announced the hiring of Racela as the head coach of the FEU Tamaraws men's basketball team in the UAAP. He replaced his brother Nash, who was appointed as the head coach of the PBA team TNT Katropa. This also serves as his first head coaching job in a varsity basketball team.

Racela left FEU in 2022. Racela coached the Tamaraws to four semifinals appearances in his first four years, and ended with a 37–39 record. In his fifth year, the Tamaraws missed the playoffs.

The Perpetual Atlas appointed him as head coach in 2024. The Altas missed the playoffs in Racela's first season with them. In the next season, the Altas secured the number one seed for the first time in 21 years at the top of Group A with a 9-4 record in the eliminations. They missed the finals but secured the third place against the Benilde Blazers

== Coaching record ==
=== Collegiate record ===
Season	Team	Elimination round					Playoffs				
Season	Team	GP	W	L	PCT	Finish	GP	W	L	PCT	Results
2017	FEU	14	7	7	.500	4th/8	2	1	1	.500	Lost in the semifinals
2018	FEU	14	8	6	.571	4th/8	2	1	1	.500	Lost in the semifinals
2019	FEU	14	8	6	.571	3rd/8	1	0	1	.000	Lost in the stepladder round 1
2020	FEU	Season cancelled									
2021	FEU	14	7	7	.500	4th/8	1	0	1	.000	Lost in the semifinals
2022	FEU	14	5	9	.358	7th/8	—	—	—	—	Did not qualify
2024	UPHSD	18	7	11	.388	8th/10	—	—	—	—	Did not qualify
2025	UPHSD	13	9	4	.692	1st/5th	4	2	2	.500	Lost in the semifinals
Totals		101	51	50	.505	—	10	4	6	.400	0 championships

=== PBA ===
Season	Team	Conference	Elims./Clas. round					Playoffs				
Season	Team	Conference	GP	W	L	PCT	Finish	PG	W	L	PCT	Results
2012–13	Petron	Philippine Cup	14	6	8	.429	7th	1	0	1	.000	Quarterfinals
2012–13	Petron	Commissioner's Cup	14	8	6	.571	3rd	2	0	2	.000	Quarterfinals
Career Total			28	14	14	.500	—	3	0	3	.000	0 championships

== Personal life ==
Racela's nickname was based on the day of his birth as it was during All-Saints Day.

His brother, Raoul Cesar or Nash Racela, is currently the head coach of the Adamson Soaring Falcons and the former head coach of the FEU Tamaraws who were champions in the UAAP. Nash also coached the Batangas Blades in the Metropolitan Basketball Association. Olsen has 3 children namely Ryan, Raya, and Rafa.

He is a cousin of former Blue Eagle and San Beda head coach Yuri Escueta.

== Basketball career ==
=== School leagues ===
- 1984: Ateneo de Manila - PAYA Aspirants
- 1985: Ateneo de Manila - PAYA Juniors
- 1986 Ateneo de Manila - UAAP Juniors
- 1987-1992: Ateneo de Manila - UAAP Seniors

=== Philippine Basketball League ===
- 1989: Crispa Redmanizers
- 1990-1991: A&W Rootbeers
- 1992: Pop Cola

=== Philippine Basketball Association ===
- 1993–1996: Purefoods Tender Juicy Hotdogs
- 1997–2011: San Miguel Beermen

=== National teams ===
- 1987 Asian Youth 18 years and below, Qatar
- 1989 ABC Under-18 Championship, Manila
- 1998 Asian Games, Thailand
- 1998 Jones Cup, Taipei
- 2002 Asian Games, Busan, South Korea

== Awards and achievements ==
=== Philippine Basketball Association ===
- 1993 Mr. Quality Minutes
- 1998-1999 2-time Mythical Second Team
- 2000-2001 2-time Mythical First Team
- 2000-01, 2003–04, 2006 5-time All-Star
- 2002-2003 Mythical Second team
- 2004 21st member of 2000-Assist Club
- 2010 5th member of 900 Games club

Preceded by Nash Racela	FEU Tamaraws men's basketball head coach 2017–2022	Succeeded by Denok Miranda
Preceded by Myk Saguiguit	Perpetual Help Altas men's basketball head coach 2024–present	Succeeded by incumbent
