= 1993 Ginebra San Miguel season =

- Head coach: Robert Jaworski
- General manager: Bernabe Navarro
- Owner: La Tondeña Distillers, Inc.

All Filipino Cup results
- Record: 5–9 (35.7%)
- Place: 5th
- Playoff finish: Quarterfinals

Commissioner's Cup results
- Record: 3–8 (27.3%)
- Place: 6th
- Playoff finish: Eliminated

Governors Cup results
- Record: 1–9 (10%)
- Place: 7th
- Playoff finish: Eliminated

Ginebra San Miguel seasons

The 1993 Ginebra San Miguel season was the 15th season of the franchise in the Philippine Basketball Association (PBA).

== Draft pick ==
Round	Pick	Player	College
1	2	Victor Pablo	FEU

== Summary ==
The Ginebras won their first game of the season by defeating 7-Up in the main game of the opening twinbill in the league's new home at Cuneta Astrodome. The Gins would lose five in a row and then won their last four games of the eliminations in the All-Filipino Cup to make it to the quarterfinal round where they dropped all their four matches.

Brian Gilgeous was Ginebra's first choice for their import in the Commissioner's Cup, he was sent home even before the second conference started. Coming in to replace him is Tony Massop, the number one draft pick in the Continental Basketball League in 1991. After leading the Gins to two victories in four games, Massop refused to play in their next game upon discovering that a certain import Eric Meeks, a recommendee by retired Ginebra cager Francis Arnaiz, was present and brought in secretly to try out for the team. Massop left and packed his bags as the Gins played the San Miguel Beermen without an import and were fined P50,000. Brian Shorter plane in and played four games, but after a lackluster performance in Ginebra's 91–97 loss to winless Sta.Lucia Realtors in Dumaguete City on July 17, Shorter left the squad without giving notice, sources said he was reprimanded by coach Jaworski after the game, prompting him to sneak out of the country. Ginebra was almost out of contention for a semis berth when they played their last two games with their fifth reinforcement Benny Bolton, who used his Islam name Benjamin Muhammad.

In the Governor's Cup, Darryl McDonald was found to be over the height limit. Terry Thames arrived and measured just in time for Ginebra's first game against Alaska. Thames was impressive in scoring 40 points despite the Gins’ 98–102 loss to the Milkmen. They won their next game against Shell Helix, 109–101 in Davao City on October 2, but lost their remaining eight assignments in the eliminations for a dismal season.

== Roster ==
1993 Ginebra San Miguel roster
Players

Pos.	#	POB	Name	Height	Weight	DOB (YYYY–MM–DD)	From
C	1	(Philippines)	Manny Victorino	6 ft 5 in (1.96 m)			JRC
C	5	(Philippines)	Sonny Cabatu	6 ft 5 in (1.96 m)			PSBA
G	7	(Philippines)	Robert Jaworski	6 ft 1 in (1.85 m)			UE
G/F	8	(Philippines)	Silverio Palad	6 ft 2 in (1.88 m)			UST
F	9	(Philippines)	Macky De Joya	6 ft 3 in (1.91 m)			San Beda
G/F	11	(Philippines)	Jayvee Gayoso	6 ft 0 in (1.83 m)			Ateneo
F	12	(Philippines)	Dante Gonzalgo	6 ft 1 in (1.85 m)			Lyceum
G	17	(Philippines)	Emilio Chuatico	6 ft 0 in (1.83 m)			Ateneo
G/F	20	(Philippines)	Pat Codiñera	6 ft 2 in (1.88 m)			Far Eastern
G/F	22	(Philippines)	Alejo Alolor	6 ft 1 in (1.85 m)			Visayas
G	24	(Philippines)	Rudy Enterina	6 ft 0 in (1.83 m)			Visayas
G	25	(Philippines)	Pido Jarencio	5 ft 9 in (1.75 m)			UST
F	33	(Philippines)	Bobby Jose	6 ft 3 in (1.91 m)			UST
G/F	41	(Philippines)	Chito Loyzaga	6 ft 2 in (1.88 m)			San Beda

Coaches

Head coach

- (Philippines) Robert Jaworski

Assistant coach(es)

- (Philippines) Arlene Rodriguez
- (Philippines) Philip Cezar

Team manager

- (Philippines) Bernabe Navarro

Legend

- (C) Team captain
- Injured

== Transactions ==
=== Trades ===
Off-season	To 7-Up Victor Pablo ^{2nd overall pick in the rookie draft}	To Ginebra Manny Victorino
August 1993	To Alaska #54 Dondon Ampalayo	To Ginebra Bobby Jose

=== Additions ===
Player	Signed	Former team
Alejo Alolor	Off-season	7-Up
Pat Codiñera	Off-season	N/A
Rudy Enterina	September 1993	Sta.Lucia

=== Recruited imports ===
Name	Tournament	No.	Pos.	Ht.	College	Duration
Tony Massop	Commissioner's Cup	34	Center-Forward	6”5’	Kansas State	June 13–29
Brian Shorter	Commissioner's Cup	43	Center-Forward	6”4’	University of Pittsburgh	July 9–17
Benjamin Muhammad	Commissioner's Cup	21	Center-Forward	6”6’	NC State	July 23–27
Terry Thames	Governors Cup	23	Guard-Forward	6”0’	Southern University	September 26 to November 2
