= Nat Canson =

Filipino basketball player and coach

Personal information
- Born: December 12, 1940 (age 85)

Career information
- College: UE

Career history

Coaching
- 1983–1984: San Miguel Beermen
- 1987: Hills Bros. Coffee Kings
- 1988–199X: Pelita Jaya
- –: Sta. Lucia Realtors
- 1997–?: Agfa
- 200X–2012: Satria Muda
- 2012: Indonesia U18
- 2012–2014: Pelita Jaya

Career highlights
- As head coach: NBL Indonesia Coach of the Year (2011); PABL champion (1985 Challenge)
Medals
Head coach Philippines
SEA Games
Silver medal – second place	1979 Jakarta	Team

Nathaniel Canson (born December 12, 1940) is a Filipino former basketball player and coach.

== Playing career ==
Canson played for the UE Red Warriors of the University of the East.

== Coaching career ==
=== Club ===
Canson was coach for San Miguel Beer in the Philippine Basketball Association (PBA) in 1983–1984. He then handled the ESQ Merchants the following year in the PABL Challenge to Champions.

Later, he returned to the PBA, becoming coach of Hills Bros. in early 1987, replacing Tony Vasquez. He resigned around September of the same year, to focus on his coaching role with the Sta. Lucia Realtors of the then Philippine Amateur Basketball League (PABL).

Canson became coach of the Pelita Jaya in 1988 upon recommendation of player Bong Ramos. He led the team to two Indonesian national championships, and mentored the squad which took part in the 1992 William Jones Cup in Taiwan.

He then coached Sta. Lucia again, which has moved to the PBA.

In 1997, Canson became coach of Agfa of the Philippine Basketball League.

He later returned to Indonesia to coach Satria Muda.

In late 2012, Canson returned to Pelita Jaya and coached until 2014.

=== National team ===
Canson was coach of the Philippine national team which finished as fourth place in the 1982 Asian Games in New Delhi. In 2012, Canson was appointed coach of the Indonesian under-18 team, replacing William McCammon.
