= 1993 Swift Mighty Meaty Hotdogs season =

- Head coach: Yeng Guiao
- General manager: Elmer Yanga
- Owner: RFM Corporation

All Filipino Cup results
- Record: 13–8 (61.9%)
- Place: 3rd
- Playoff finish: Semifinals

Commissioner's Cup results
- Record: 19–6 (76%)
- Place: 1st
- Playoff finish: Champions

Governor's Cup results
- Record: 14–11 (56%)
- Place: 2nd
- Playoff finish: Runner-up

Swift Mighty Meaty Hotdogs seasons

The 1993 Swift Mighty Meaty Hotdogs season was the 4th season of the franchise in the Philippine Basketball Association (PBA).

== Draft picks ==
Round	Pick	Player
2	12	Vilmer Banares
3		Teddy Monasterio

== 2nd PBA title ==
Swift found the right import in Ronnie Thompkins after sending home their original choice, Ledell Eackles, a starter from the Washington Bullets in the NBA, who was overweight when he came to this team. The Mighty Meaties won their first six games in the Commissioner's Cup, and emerged with the best record in the eliminations, with nine wins and two losses. Swift made it to the finals with the conference-best 15-4 won-loss slate. They won their second PBA crown with a 4-2 series victory over Purefoods Oodles, stopping their corporate rival's bid for a second straight crown of the season and exacting revenge over the team that beat them in the All-Filipino finals two years ago.

== Runner-up finish ==
The Mighty Meaties struggled early in the Governors Cup elimination round by dropping three of their first five games, with most of the blame on import Tony Harris. Swift were able to regain their winning ways and won their last five games for a 7-3 won-loss record. The semifinal round was a roller-coaster ride for the Mighty Meaties, losing and winning each time in their outings. They won their last game against Purefoods, 114-112 on November 26, to earn a playoff for a finals berth.

Swift had to go through two sudden-death playoffs against Pepsi Mega and Sta. Lucia to enter the finals against San Miguel Beermen. The Mighty Meaties, who lost all three of their previous matches with the Beermen going into the championship series, were beaten in five games.

== Notable dates ==
March 2: Nelson Asaytono scored 46 points as Swift won their first game of the season with a 113-103 win over Alaska Milk.

June 27: In the battle of unbeaten teams, Swift defeated Shell Helix for their fourth win in a row, 124-116.

July 18: In a highly-anticipated match-up, the Mighty Meaties scored an easy 132-108 win over Purefoods Oodles for their seventh win in eight games. The Oodles before the game were coming off a six-game winning streak since the arrival of their import Carey Scurry.

September 28: Tony Harris scored 74 points to lead Swift to a 124-107 win over Pepsi Mega.

== Occurrences ==
On July 25, the Swift Mighty Meaties beat Shell Helix Oilers, 118-117 in overtime on Terry Saldaña's last-second basket. That game featured a rumble and players banished from the playing court during the second quarter. The ugly incident started when Shell forward Ricky Relosa hit Swift import Ronnie Thompkins in the nape during a scuffle underneath the Swift basket and a brief chase ensued. The five players ejected for their involvement in the brawl were Relosa and Mulong Orillosa of Shell, and Ronnie Thompkins, Zaldy Realubit and Cadel Mosqueda of Swift.

== Awards ==
- Ronnie Thompkins won Best Import honors in the Commissioner's Cup.
- Vergel Meneses was voted Commissioner's Cup finals MVP. The Aerial Voyager was also named the season's Most Improved Player.

== Roster ==
1993 Swift Mighty Meaty Hotdogs roster
Players

Pos.	#	POB	Name	Height	Weight	DOB (YYYY–MM–DD)	From
G	8	(Philippines)	Al Solis	5 ft 11 in (1.80 m)			Visayas
F	10	(Philippines)	Eric Reyes	6 ft 4 in (1.93 m)			Ateneo
F	11	(Philippines)	Nelson Asaytono	6 ft 3 in (1.91 m)			Manila
C	12	(Philippines)	Bonel Balingit	6 ft 9 in (2.06 m)			Visayas
F	13	(Philippines)	Elpidio Villamin	6 ft 2 in (1.88 m)
G	14	(Philippines)	Rudy Distrito	5 ft 11 in (1.80 m)			UE
G	15	(Philippines)	Juancho Estrada	5 ft 11 in (1.80 m)			Adamson
G	16	(Philippines)	Marcelino Albarillo	5 ft 10 in (1.78 m)			Mindanao
F	17	(Philippines)	Terry Saldaña	6 ft 3 in (1.91 m)			Letran
F	18	(Philippines)	Vergel Meneses	6 ft 3 in (1.91 m)			José Rizal
F	24	(Philippines)	Richard Bognot (injured)	6 ft 3 in (1.91 m)
C	35	(Philippines)	Zaldy Realubit	6 ft 6 in (1.98 m)			USJ-R
F/C	48	(Philippines)	Cadel Mosqueda	6 ft 3 in (1.91 m)			Arellano

Coaches

Head coach

- (Philippines) Yeng Guiao

Assistant coach(es)

- (Philippines) Roehl Nadurata
- (Philippines) Arturo Valenzona

Legend

- (C) Team captain
- Injured

== Transactions ==
=== Additions ===
Player	Signed	Former team
Vilmer Banares	Off-season	N/A
Cadel Mosqueda	Off-season	Presto
Teroy Albarillo	June 1993	N/A

=== Trades ===
June 1993	To Sta. Lucia Realtors #26 Andy De Guzman, #41 Jack Tanuan, #23 Ric-Ric Marata	To Swift Vergel Meneses, Zaldy Realubit

=== Subtractions ===
Player	Signed	New team
#16 Vilmer Banares	June 1993	Sta. Lucia Realtors

=== Recruited imports ===
Name	Conference	No.	Pos.	Ht.	College	Duration
Ronnie Thompkins	Commissioner's Cup	44	Center-forward	6"5'	Fort Hays State University	June 15 to September 7
Tony Harris	Governors Cup	22	Guard	6"2'	University of New Orleans	September 28 to December 14
