= 1993 PBA season =

19th PBA season

- Duration: February 28 – December 14, 1993
- Teams: 8
- TV partner: Vintage Sports (PTV)

1993 PBA Draft
- Top draft pick: Jun Limpot
- Picked by: Sta. Lucia Realtors
- Season MVP: Alvin Patrimonio (Purefoods TJ Hotdogs)
- All-Filipino Cup champions: Coney Island Ice Cream Stars
- All-Filipino Cup runners-up: San Miguel Beermen
- Commissioner's Cup champions: Swift Mighty Meaty Hotdogs
- Commissioner's Cup runners-up: Purefoods Oodles
- Governors Cup champions: San Miguel Beermen
- Governors Cup runners-up: Swift Mighty Meaty Hotdogs

Seasons
- ← 1992 1994 →

The 1993 PBA season was the 19th season of the Philippine Basketball Association (PBA).

== Board of governors ==
=== Executive committee ===
- Reynaldo G. Marquez (Commissioner)
- Luis Lorenzo, Sr. (Chairman, representing Pepsi Mega Hotshots)
- Wilfred Steven Uytengsu, representing Alaska Milkmen)
- Nazario L. Avedaño (Treasurer, representing San Miguel Beermen)

=== Teams ===
Team	Company	Governor
Alaska Milkmen	General Milling Corporation	Wilfred Steven Uytengsu
Ginebra San Miguel	La Tondeña Distillers, Inc.	Bernabe Navarro, Jr.
Pepsi Mega Hotshots	Pepsi-Cola Products Philippines, Inc.	Luis Lorenzo, Sr.
Purefoods Hotdogs	Purefoods Corporation	Renato Buhain
San Miguel Beermen	San Miguel Corporation	Nazario Avendaño
Shell Helix Ultra	Pilipinas Shell Petroleum Corporation	Edgardo Veron Cruz
Sta. Lucia Realtors	Consolidated Foods Corporation	Vicente Santos
Swift Mighty Meaties	Republic Flour Mills Corporation	Elmer Yanga

== Season highlights ==
- The league moves to its new home, the Cuneta Astrodome in Pasay.
- The PBA unveils their new logo during the opening ceremonies on February 28. The logo was chosen from more than 2000 entries in a nationwide contest held on January, following the theme "It's more than just basketball". The winning logo design was created by a professional graphic designer from Manila, Oscar de Castro (www.oscardecastro.ca) who is now based in Winnipeg, Manitoba, Canada. The logo would debut on the uniforms at the beginning of the season's Governors' Cup.
- The league changes their playdates from Tuesdays, Thursdays and Sundays to Tuesdays, Fridays and Sundays. The move of their second weekly playdate from Thursday to Friday is to attract weekend crowds.
- Sta. Lucia Realtors made its debut in the league, parading top draft pick Zandro "Jun" Limpot and former players from the Presto franchise led by Vergel Meneses.
- Benjie Paras was unable to come in terms with his team Shell Rimula X at the start of the season as he declared that he wanted to be traded to Ginebra San Miguel, he was not able to play in the All-Filipino Conference. A settlement was reached before the start of the Second Conference.
- The All-Filipino Cup became the opening conference of the season, Coney Island Ice Cream Stars (formerly Purefoods TJ Hotdogs) defeated the San Miguel Beermen for the title. Coney Island coach Vincent "Chot" Reyes made history as the first coach to claim a PBA crown in his maiden season with the team.
- The Second Conference was renamed Commissioner's Cup, corporate rivals Purefoods and Swift Mighty Meaties faced off for the second time in the finals with Swift snagging their second championship behind the exploits of best import Ronnie Thompkins. The said conference was also full of blockbuster trades that saw several players traded to other teams.
- The Third Conference was named after the PBA Board of Governors and was called Governor's Cup. The San Miguel Beermen surpassed the defunct Toyota ballclub as the second winningest team, capturing their 10th title by defeating Swift Mighty Meaties, who were led by the returning high-scoring import Tony Harris.
- Purefoods forward Alvin Patrimonio won his second Most Valuable Player (MVP) award in three years in a hotly-contested race between him and teammate Jerry Codiñera for the coveted award.

== Opening ceremonies ==
The muses for the participating teams are as follows:

Team	Muse
Alaska Milkmen	Sadie Callahan
Coney Island Ice Cream Stars	Bea Lucero
Ginebra San Miguel	Hazel Huelvas
San Miguel Beermen	Donita Rose
7-Up Uncolas	Rosanna Escudero
Shell Rimula X	Liza Berroya and Janine Barredo
Sta. Lucia Realtors	Ruffa Gutierrez and Apols Gutierrez
Swift Mighty Meaty Hotdogs	Gelli de Belen

== Champions ==
- All-Filipino Cup: Coney Island Ice Cream Stars
- Commissioner's Cup: Swift Mighty Meaty Hotdogs
- Governors Cup: San Miguel Beermen
- Team with best win–loss percentage: San Miguel Beermen (46–25, .648)
- Best Team of the Year: San Miguel Beermen (4th)

== All-Filipino Cup ==
=== Elimination round ===
Pos	Team	W	L	PCT	GB	Qualification
1	San Miguel Beermen	8	2	.800	—	Quarterfinal round
2	Sta. Lucia Realtors	6	4	.600	2	Quarterfinal round
3	Coney Island Ice Cream Stars	6	4	.600	2	Quarterfinal round
4	Swift Mighty Meaty Hotdogs	6	4	.600	2	Quarterfinal round
5	Ginebra San Miguel	5	5	.500	3	Quarterfinal round
6	Alaska Milkmen	4	6	.400	4	
7	7-Up Uncolas	3	7	.300	5	
8	Shell Rimula X	2	8	.200	6	

=== Quarterfinal round ===
Pos	Team	W	L	PCT	GB	Qualification
1	San Miguel Beermen	10	4	.714 (Note: Head-to-head record: San Miguel 1–1 Swift; San Miguel +3, Swift −3)	—	Semifinals
2	Swift Mighty Meaty Hotdogs	10	4	.714	—	Semifinals
3	Coney Island Ice Cream Stars	9	5	.643	1	Semifinals
4	Sta. Lucia Realtors	7	7	.500	3	Semifinals
5	Ginebra San Miguel	5	9	.357	5	

=== Playoffs ===
Semifinals (Best-of-5)
1	San Miguel	3
4	Sta. Lucia	1
2	Swift	0
3	Coney Island	3

Finals (Best-of-7)
1	San Miguel	2
3	Coney Island	4
Third place playoffs (Best-of-5)
2	Swift	3
4	Sta. Lucia	1

==== Semifinals ====
Team 1	Series	Team 2	Game 1	Game 2	Game 3	Game 4	Game 5
(1) San Miguel Beermen	3–1	(4) Sta. Lucia Realtors	90–91	86–83	112–102	121–105	—
(2) Swift Mighty Meaty Hotdogs	3–1	(3) Coney Island Ice Cream Stars	86–97	97–101 (OT)	126–127 (2OT)	—	—

==== Third place playoffs ====
Team 1	Series	Team 2	Game 1	Game 2	Game 3	Game 4	Game 5
(2) Swift Mighty Meaty Hotdogs	3–1	(4) Sta. Lucia Realtors	126–103	130–116	101–110	121–104	—

==== Finals ====
Team 1	Series	Team 2	Game 1	Game 2	Game 3	Game 4	Game 5	Game 6	Game 7
(1) San Miguel Beermen	2–4	(3) Coney Island Ice Cream Stars	100–90	95–104	88–94	95–96	106–91	96–99 (OT)	—

== Commissioner's Cup ==
=== Elimination round ===
Pos	Team	W	L	PCT	GB	Qualification
1	Swift Mighty Meaty Hotdogs	9	2	.818	—	Semifinal round
2	Purefoods Oodles	8	3	.727	1	Semifinal round
3	San Miguel Beermen	7	4	.636	2	Semifinal round
4	Shell Helix Oilers	7	4	.636	2	Semifinal round
5	Alaska Milkmen	6	5	.545	3	Semifinal round
6	Ginebra San Miguel	3	8	.273	6	
7	7-Up Uncolas	3	8	.273	6	
8	Sta. Lucia Realtors	1	10	.091	8	

=== Semifinal round ===
- Cumulative standings

Pos	Team	W	L	PCT	GB	Qualification
1	Swift Mighty Meaty Hotdogs	15	4	.789	—	Advance to the finals
2	Purefoods Oodles	11	8	.579 (Note: Second-seed playoff: Purefoods 119–101 San Miguel)	4	Advance to the finals
3	San Miguel Beermen	11	8	.579	4	Proceed to third-place playoffs
4	Shell Helix Oilers	10	9	.526 (Note: Head-to-head record: Shell 3–1 Alaska)	5	Proceed to third-place playoffs
5	Alaska Milkmen	10	9	.526	5	

Notes:
- Semifinal round standings:

Pos	Team	W	L
1	Swift Mighty Meaty Hotdogs	6	2
2	San Miguel Beermen	4	4
3	Alaska Milkmen	4	4
4	Purefoods Oodles	3	5
5	Shell Helix Oilers	3	5

=== Third place playoffs ===
Team 1	Series	Team 2	Game 1	Game 2	Game 3	Game 4	Game 5
(3) San Miguel Beermen	3–1	(4) Shell Helix Oilers	133–114	106–100	122–123	134–111	—

=== Finals ===
Team 1	Series	Team 2	Game 1	Game 2	Game 3	Game 4	Game 5	Game 6	Game 7
(1) Swift Mighty Meaty Hotdogs	4–2	(2) Purefoods Oodles	100–93	92–117	102–92	112–102	112–134	108–99	—

- Best Import of the Conference: Ronnie Thompkins (Swift)

== Governors' Cup ==
=== Elimination round ===
Pos	Team	W	L	PCT	GB	Qualification
1	San Miguel Beermen	8	2	.800	—	Semifinal round
2	Swift Mighty Meaty Hotdogs	7	3	.700	1	Semifinal round
3	Purefoods Tender Juicy Hotdogs	7	3	.700	1	Semifinal round
4	Pepsi Mega Bottlers	7	3	.700	1	Semifinal round
5	Sta. Lucia Realtors	5	5	.500	3	Semifinal round
6	Alaska Milkmen	4	6	.400	4	
7	Shell Helix Oilers	1	9	.100	7	
8	Ginebra San Miguel	1	9	.100	7	

=== Semifinal round ===
Overall standings
Pos	Team	W	L	PCT	GB	Qualification
1	San Miguel Beermen	13	5	.722	—	Advance to the finals (Note: If a team outside the top two teams wins at least five semifinal round games, then it and the second-placed team will playoff for the last finals berth; otherwise, the top 2 teams qualify outright.)
2	Swift Mighty Meaty Hotdogs	11	7	.611 (Note: Second seed playoff: Swift 124–122 Pepsi (2OT))	2	Guaranteed finals berth playoff
3	Pepsi Mega Bottlers	11	7	.611	2	Proceed to third-place playoffs
4	Sta. Lucia Realtors	10	8	.556	3	Qualify to finals berth playoff
5	Purefoods Tender Juicy Hotdogs	9	9	.500	4	

Notes:

Semifinal round standings
Pos	Team	W	L	Qualification
1	San Miguel Beermen	5	3	
2	Sta. Lucia Realtors	5	3	Qualify to finals berth playoff (Note: San Miguel advanced to the finals as the #1 seeded team; finals berth playoff: Swift 130–124 Sta. Lucia)
3	Swift Mighty Meaty Hotdogs	4	4	
4	Pepsi Mega Bottlers	4	4	
5	Purefoods Tender Juicy Hotdogs	2	6	

=== Third place playoffs ===
Team 1	Series	Team 2	Game 1	Game 2	Game 3	Game 4	Game 5
(3) Pepsi Mega Bottlers	0–3	(4) Sta. Lucia Realtors	79–93	94–114	107–116	—	—

=== Finals ===
Team 1	Series	Team 2	Game 1	Game 2	Game 3	Game 4	Game 5	Game 6	Game 7
(1) San Miguel Beermen	4–1	(2) Swift Mighty Meaty Hotdogs	140–138 (2OT)	109–122	124–110 (OT)	109–104	91–89	—	—

- Best Import of the Conference: Kenny Travis (San Miguel)

== Awards ==
- Most Valuable Player: Alvin Patrimonio (Purefoods)
- Rookie of the Year: Jun Limpot (Sta. Lucia)
- Sportsmanship Award: Samboy Lim (San Miguel)
- Most Improved Player: Vergel Meneses (Swift)
- Coach of the Year: Chot Reyes (Purefoods)
- Defensive Player of the Year: Alvin Teng (San Miguel)
- Mythical Five:
  - Alfonso Solis (Swift)
  - Ato Agustin (San Miguel)
  - Jerry Codiñera (Purefoods)
  - Alvin Patrimonio (Purefoods)
  - Nelson Asaytono (Swift)
- Mythical Second Team:
  - Allan Caidic (San Miguel)
  - Samboy Lim (San Miguel)
  - Jun Limpot (Sta. Lucia)
  - Vergel Meneses (Swift)
  - Alvin Teng (San Miguel)
- All Defensive Team:
  - Jerry Codiñera (Purefoods)
  - Glenn Capacio (Purefoods)
  - Alvin Teng (San Miguel)
  - Arturo dela Cruz (San Miguel)
  - Jun Limpot (Sta. Lucia)

=== Awards given by the PBA Press Corps ===
- Mr. Quality Minutes: Olsen Racela (Purefoods)
- Humanitarian/Citizenship Award: Chito Loyzaga (Ginebra)
- Comeback Player of the Year: Paul Alvarez (Sta. Lucia)
- Mr. Clutch: Alfonso Solis (Swift)
- Role Player of the Year: Glenn Capacio (Purefoods)
- Newsmaker of the Year: Alvin Patrimonio (Purefoods)
- Referee of the Year: Ernesto de Leon

== Cumulative standings ==
Pos	Team	Pld	W	L	PCT	Best finish
1	San Miguel Beermen	71	46	25	.648	Champions
2	Swift Mighty Meaty Hotdogs	71	46	25	.648	Champions
3	Coney Island Ice Cream Stars/Purefoods Oodles/Tender Juicy Hotdogs	67	39	28	.582	Champions
4	Alaska Milkmen	39	18	21	.462	Semifinalist
5	Sta. Lucia Realtors	55	23	32	.418	Third place
6	7-Up Uncolas/Pepsi Mega Bottlers	43	17	26	.395	Semifinalist
7	Shell Rimula X/Helix Oilers	43	14	29	.326	Semifinalist
8	Ginebra San Miguel	35	9	26	.257	Semifinalist

=== Elimination round ===
Pos	Team	Pld	W	L	PCT
1	San Miguel Beermen	31	23	8	.742
2	Swift Mighty Meaty Hotdogs	31	22	9	.710
3	Coney Island Ice Cream Stars/Purefoods Oodles/Tender Juicy Hotdogs	31	21	10	.677
4	Alaska Milkmen	31	14	17	.452
5	7-Up Uncolas/Pepsi Mega Bottlers	31	13	18	.419
6	Sta. Lucia Realtors	31	12	19	.387
7	Shell Rimula X/Helix Oilers	31	10	21	.323
8	Ginebra San Miguel	31	9	22	.290

=== Playoffs ===
Pos	Team	Pld	W	L
1	Swift Mighty Meaty Hotdogs	40	24	16
2	San Miguel Beermen	40	23	17
3	Coney Island Ice Cream Stars/Purefoods Oodles/Tender Juicy Hotdogs	36	18	18
4	Sta. Lucia Realtors	24	11	13
5	7-Up Uncolas/Pepsi Mega Bottlers	12	4	8
6	Shell Rimula X/Helix Oilers	12	4	8
7	Alaska Milkmen	8	4	4
8	Ginebra San Miguel	4	0	4
