= 1993 Shell Helix Oilers season =

- Head coach: Rino Salazar
- General Manager: Charlie Favis
- Owner(s): Pilipinas Shell

All Filipino Cup results
- Record: 2–8 (20%)
- Place: 8th
- Playoff finish: N/A

Commissioner's Cup results
- Record: 11–12 (47.8%)
- Place: 4th
- Playoff finish: Semifinals

Governor's Cup results
- Record: 1–9 (10%)
- Place: 8th
- Playoff finish: N/A

Shell Helix Oilers seasons

The 1993 Shell Helix Oilers season was the 9th season of the franchise in the Philippine Basketball Association (PBA). Known as Shell Rimula X in the All-Filipino Cup.

== Draft picks ==
Round	Pick	Player	College
2	10	Saturnino Garrido	La Salle
3		Allan delos Reyes	University of Visayas

== Occurrences ==
Before the start of the season, Shell's main man Benjie Paras wanted out of his contract and signified his intentions to join his team's arch rival Ginebra San Miguel. The Shell management declined Ginebra's offer of two trade options. As it turn out, Paras skip the whole All-Filipino Cup tournament and the team suffered without their top center. The Turbo Chargers finish last by winning only two out of their 10 games in the eliminations.

After holding out for six months, Benjie Paras finally decided to signed up with Shell and played his first game in the second conference.

Forward Ricky Relosa was suspended for the rest of the conference during the Commissioner's Cup when on the July 25 Shell-Swift encounter, he punched Swift import Ronnie Thompkins on the nape which provoked Thompkins and he chase Relosa all the way to the Shell bench and a brawl ensued.

== Notable dates ==
June 13: Seven-time best import Bobby Parks was back anew as Shell opened their title-retention bid with an 85-84 squeaker past Seven-Up. Benjie Paras canned two free throws that gave Shell an 85-82 cushion with time down to 12.6 seconds.

June 18: Shell Helix romped to a 98-89 win over Ginebra as the dreaded trio of Parks, Paras and Magsanoc combined for 56 points. The Oilers starved off the Gins' late-game rally for their second win in the Commissioner's Cup.

== Roster ==
1993 Shell Helix Oilers roster
Players

Pos.	#	POB	Name	Height	Weight	DOB (YYYY–MM–DD)	From
G	5	(Philippines)	Ronnie Magsanoc	5 ft 9 in (1.75 m)			UP Diliman
G	9	(Philippines)	Leo Isaac	6 ft 1 in (1.85 m)			Mapúa
F	10	(Philippines)	Jojo Martin	6 ft 3 in (1.91 m)			NCBA
G	11	(Philippines)	Eric Altamirano	5 ft 11 in (1.80 m)			UP Diliman
F	12	(Philippines)	Romeo Dela Rosa	6 ft 2 in (1.88 m)			Southwestern-U
C	14	(Philippines)	Benjie Paras	6 ft 5 in (1.96 m)			UP Diliman
F/C	15	(Philippines)	Ricky Relosa	6 ft 3 in (1.91 m)			Mapúa
F	16	(Philippines)	Allan Delos Reyes	6 ft 2 in (1.88 m)			San Sebastian
G	17	(Philippines)	Joey Loyzaga	6 ft 0 in (1.83 m)			San Beda
G	21	(Philippines)	Saturnino Garrido	5 ft 11 in (1.80 m)			San Sebastian
C	25 & 18	(Philippines)	Rey Cuenco	6 ft 4 in (1.93 m)			De La Salle Araneta
F	28	(Philippines)	Mulong Orillosa	6 ft 2 in (1.88 m)			Adamson
C	32	(Philippines)	Jolly Escobar	6 ft 5 in (1.96 m)			UE
C	41	(Philippines)	Abet Guidaben	6 ft 5 in (1.96 m)			USJ–R

Coaches

Head coach

- (Philippines) Rino Salazar

Assistant coach(es)

- (Philippines) Manuel Pineda
- (Philippines) Cris Calilan

Team manager

- (Philippines) Charlie Favis

Legend

- (C) Team captain
- Injured

== Transactions ==
=== Short-term contracts ===
NAME	#	POS	HT	COLLEGE
Anthony Poblador	20	Center	6"6'	De La Salle
Peter Aguilar	4	Center-Forward	6"6'	Trinity
Onchie Dela Cruz	8	Guard	5"11'	PCU

=== Additions ===
Player	Signed	Former team
Abet Guidaben	September 1993	7-Up

=== Recruited imports ===
Name	Tournament	No.	Pos.	Ht.	College	Duration
Bobby Parks	Commissioner's Cup	22	Forward	6"3'	Memphis State	June 13 to September 3
Mike Morrison	Governors Cup	2	Guard-Forward	6"2'	Loyola University Maryland	September 28 to October 10
Calvin Talford	Governors Cup		Guard-Forward	6"2'	ETSU	October 15 to November 5
