= 1993 San Miguel Beermen season =

- Head coach: Norman Black
- Owner: San Miguel Corporation

All Filipino Cup results
- Record: 15–9 (62.5%)
- Place: 2nd
- Playoff finish: Runner-up

Commissioner's Cup results
- Record: 14–10 (58.3%)
- Place: 3rd
- Playoff finish: Semifinals

Governor's Cup results
- Record: 17–6 (73.9%)
- Place: 1st
- Playoff finish: Champions

San Miguel Beermen seasons

The 1993 San Miguel Beermen season was the 19th season of the franchise in the Philippine Basketball Association (PBA).

== Draft picks ==
Round	Pick	Player
2	15	Rodolfo Abad
3		Nicasio Serafica

== Runner-up finish ==
The entry of Allan Caidic to the lineup of San Miguel Beermen reunites him with his former NCC teammates Samboy Lim, Hector Calma, Franz Pumaren and Yves Dignadice. Along with last season's Most Valuable Player (MVP) Ato Agustin, the Beermen now formed a threesome combo with Caidic, Lim and Agustin and were installed as heavy favorites to bag the All-Filipino crown.

On March 2, Allan Caidic debut in San Miguel uniform as the star studded Beermen prevailed over Coney Island (formerly Purefoods), 106–98. As expected, San Miguel finish on top of the eliminations with eight wins and two defeats, losing only to newcomer Sta.Lucia Realtors and to Coney Island in the last playing date of the elimination round. The Beermen are tied with Swift after the round-robin quarterfinals among five teams with 10 wins and four losses. They advanced into the final playoffs with Coney Island by winning over Sta.Lucia Realtors, three games to one, in their best-of-five semifinal series. In the All-Filipino Cup championship rematch, the Beermen lost in six games to the equally talented Coney Island Ice Cream Stars.

== 10th PBA title ==
Kenny Travis return for the Governor's Cup and scored 49 points in San Miguel's 129–107 win over Sta.Lucia in the opening game on September 26. The Beermen nip Swift, 112–110, in their next game on October 1 in an early clash of top favorites. San Miguel finish with the best record in the eliminations with eight wins and two losses, they dropped their first two games in the semifinals, but won their next four assignments and assured itself of a first finals berth with their 12th win in 16 games, winning over Swift for the third time in the conference, 95–89 on November 23.

San Miguel battled the Swift Mighty Meaties, who were looking for their second straight title in the season, for the Governor's Cup crown. Behind eventual best import winner Kenny Travis, which got the better of his match-up with the high-scoring Tony Harris, the Beermen surprisingly won the finals series in just five games and clinch their 10th PBA title.

== Roster ==
1993 San Miguel Beermen roster
Players

Pos.	#	POB	Name	Height	Weight	DOB (YYYY–MM–DD)	From
G/F	1	(Philippines)	Bong Ravena	6 ft 1 in (1.85 m)			UE
C	4	(Philippines)	Julian Tomacruz	6 ft 6 in (1.98 m)			UST
G	5	(Philippines)	Franz Pumaren	5 ft 9 in (1.75 m)			De La Salle
G	6	(Philippines)	Ato Agustin	5 ft 11 in (1.80 m)			Lyceum
G	7	(Philippines)	Rodolfo Abad	6 ft 0 in (1.83 m)			Southwestern-U
F	8	(Philippines)	Allan Caidic	6 ft 2 in (1.88 m)			UE
F	9	(Philippines)	Samboy Lim	6 ft 0 in (1.83 m)			Letran
F/C	10	(Philippines)	Alvin Teng	6 ft 4 in (1.93 m)			Arellano
G/F	11	(Philippines)	Biboy Ravanes	6 ft 0 in (1.83 m)			Cebu
F/C	12	(Philippines)	Yves Dignadice	6 ft 4 in (1.93 m)			STI WNU
G	14	(Philippines)	Hector Calma	5 ft 9 in (1.75 m)			Adamson
F	18	(Philippines)	Art Dela Cruz	6 ft 2 in (1.88 m)			San Sebastian
C	19	(Philippines)	Ramon Fernandez	6 ft 4 in (1.93 m)			San Carlos
C	20	(Philippines)	Adriano Polistico	6 ft 7 in (2.01 m)			Letran

Coaches

Head coach

- (United States) Norman Black

Assistant coach(es)

- (Philippines) Jong Uichico
- (Philippines) Pilo Pumaren

Team manager

- (Philippines) Eddie Veneracion

Legend

- (C) Team captain
- Injured

== Transactions ==
=== Additions ===
Player	Signed	Former team
Allan Caidic	Off-season	Presto
Adriano Polistico	Off-season	Alaska
Rodolfo Abad	June 1993	N/A

=== Recruited imports ===
Name	Conference	No.	Pos.	Ht.	College	Duration
Pat Durham	Commissioner's Cup	23	Center-Forward	6"5'	Colorado State University	June 15 to September 3
Kenny Travis	Governors Cup	21	Guard-Forward	6"1'	New Mexico State University	September 26 to December 14
