= 1993 PBA draft =

Player selection in Philippine basketball

General information
- Date: January 17, 1993
- Time: 4:00 pm
- Location: Rigodon Ballroom, The Peninsula Manila, Makati
- Network: Vintage Sports on PTV

Overview
- League: Philippine Basketball Association
- First selection: Jun Limpot (Sta. Lucia Realtors)

The 1993 Philippine Basketball Association (PBA) rookie draft was an event at which teams drafted players from the amateur ranks. It was held on January 17, 1993, at the Rigodon Ballroom of the Manila Peninsula.

== Round 1 ==
Pick	Player	Country of origin*	PBA team	College
1	Zandro Limpot Jr.	Philippines	Sta. Lucia Realtors	De La Salle
2	Victor Pablo	Philippines	Ginebra San Miguel	Far Eastern
3	Johnny Abarrientos	Philippines	Alaska Milkmen	Far Eastern
4	Dwight Lago	Philippines	Coney Island Ice Cream Stars	De La Salle
5	Benito Cheng	Philippines	Coney Island Ice Cream Stars	Mapua
6	Johnedel Cardel	Philippines	Alaska Milkmen	De La Salle
7	Teodorico Fernandez III	Philippines	Swift Mighty Meaties	San Agustin
8	Richard Bachmann	Philippines	Alaska Milkmen	De La Salle

== Round 2 ==
Pick	Player	Country of origin*	PBA team	College
9	Michael Mustre	Philippines	Sta. Lucia Realtors	Letran
10	Saturnino Allan Garrido	Philippines	Shell Helix	San Sebastian
11	Freddie Abuda	Philippines	Coney Island Ice Cream Stars	Cebu
12	Vilmer Banares	Philippines	Swift Mighty Meaties	East
13	Felix Duhig	Philippines	Alaska Milkmen	CIT
14	Roderico Racela	Philippines	Coney Island Ice Cream Stars	Ateneo de Manila
15	Rodolfo Abad	Philippines	San Miguel Beermen	Southwestern

== Round 3 ==
Pick	Player	Country of origin*	PBA team	College
	Max Delantes	Philippines	Sta. Lucia Realtors	Visayas
	Allan delos Reyes	Philippines	Shell Helix	San Sebastian
	Victor Villarias	Philippines	Coney Island Ice Cream Stars	East
	Jack Santiago	Philippines	7-Up Bottlers	Mapua
	Nicasio Serafica	Philippines	San Miguel Beermen	Southwestern
	Teddy Monasterio	Philippines	Swift Mighty Meaties	De La Salle

== Round 4 ==
Pick	Player	Country of origin*	PBA team	College
	Gelacio Abanilla	Philippines	7-Up Bottlers	De La Salle
	Mar Anthony Magada	Philippines	Swift Mighty Meaties	Trinity (Quezon City)

== Round 5 ==
Pick	Player	Country of origin*	PBA team	College
	Romeo Baquiao	Philippines	Swift Mighty Meaties	

== Round 6 ==
Pick	Player	Country of origin*	PBA team	College
	Emmanuel Bonleon	Philippines	Swift Mighty Meaties	

== Round 7 ==
Pick	Player	Country of origin*	PBA team	College
	Eugenio Reyes	Philippines	Swift Mighty Meaties	EARIST

== Notes ==
- Victor Pablo, the second overall pick, was later traded by Ginebra to Seven Up, in exchange for center Manny Victorino, when Pablo held up in contract negotiations.
- The Draft reached the seventh round with Swift Mighty Meaties choosing three more players including an EARIST cager Eugenio Reyes.
- Purefoods' pick Victor Villarias' elder brother Vernie was a first-round pick by the Hotdogs two years earlier; this was the only instance in Purefoods' history that brothers were selected in the two separate drafts.

== Sources ==
- "Sta. Lucia set to pick Limpot in PBA draft," The Philippine Star, January 17, 1993
- "Sta. Lucia confident of signing Limpot," The Philippine Star, January 18, 1993
- "Pablo-Victorino trade eyed; more transfers likely," The Philippine Star, January 24, 1993
