= 1993 Pepsi Mega Bottlers season =

- Head coach: Derrick Pumaren
- General manager: Steve Watson
- Owner: Pepsi Philippines

All Filipino Cup results
- Record: 3–7 (30%)
- Place: 7th
- Playoff finish: N/A

Commissioner's Cup results
- Record: 3–8 (27.3%)
- Place: 7th
- Playoff finish: N/A

Governors Cup results
- Record: 11–11 (50%)
- Place: 4th
- Playoff finish: Semifinals

Pepsi Mega Bottlers seasons

The 1993 Pepsi Mega Bottlers season was the 4th season of the franchise in the Philippine Basketball Association (PBA). Known as 7-Up Uncolas in the All-Filipino Cup and Commissioner's Cup.

== Draft picks ==
Round	Pick	Player
3		Gerardo Santiago
4		Gelacio Abanilla

== Notable dates ==
June 18: Seven-Up defeated Sta.Lucia, 101–99, for its first win in the Commissioners Cup after losing to Shell Helix in their first game. Ludovico Valenciano completed an assist by Kenny Redfield with a fraction of a second left.

November 28: Pepsi Mega forge two playoffs among three teams for the right to face San Miguel Beermen for the Governors Cup finals with a come-from-behind 96–93 triumph over Purefoods. Kenny Redfield put together his 11th triple-double game of 48 points, 16 rebounds and 11 assists.

== Occurrences ==
The Mega Bottlers import Anthony Martin scored 40 points in his debut in the Governor's Cup, a 107–124 loss by Pepsi to Swift. Martin fractured his thumb in practice and coach Derrick Pumaren was left with no choice but to shipped Martin home after just one game and recalled Kenny Redfield, who was also their import in the Commissioner's Cup.

== Roster ==
1993 Pepsi Mega Bottlers roster
Players

Pos.	#	POB	Name	Height	Weight	DOB (YYYY–MM–DD)	From
G/F	3	(Philippines)	Romeo Lopez	6 ft 0 in (1.83 m)			Angeles
G	7	(Philippines)	Eugene Quilban	5 ft 7 in (1.70 m)			San Sebastian
F	8	(Philippines)	Roberto Jabar	6 ft 0 in (1.83 m)			Southwestern-U
G/F	9	(Philippines)	Naning Valenciano	6 ft 2 in (1.88 m)			USLS
F	14	(Philippines)	Larry Villanil	6 ft 1 in (1.85 m)			USPF
F/C	15	(Philippines)	Joey Santamaria	6 ft 3 in (1.91 m)			De La Salle
F	17	(Philippines)	Jeffrey Graves	6 ft 3 in (1.91 m)			Angeles
C	25	(Philippines)	Gido Babilonia	6 ft 6 in (1.98 m)			UST
F	27	(Philippines)	Django Rivera	6 ft 2 in (1.88 m)			San Sebastian
F/C	33	(Philippines)	Victor Pablo	6 ft 3 in (1.91 m)			Far Eastern
F	50	(Philippines)	Nap Hatton	6 ft 1 in (1.85 m)			San Sebastian
G	58	(Philippines)	Leo Austria	5 ft 11 in (1.80 m)			Lyceum

Coaches

Head coach

- (Philippines) Derrick Pumaren

Assistant coach(es)

- (Philippines) Gabby Velasco

Legend

- (C) Team captain
- Injured

== Transactions ==
=== Trades ===
Off-season	To Ginebra Manny Victorino	To 7-Up Victor Pablo ^{2nd overall pick from Ginebra}

=== Additions ===
Player	Signed	Former team
Jeffrey Graves	Off-season	San Miguel
Romeo Lopez	Off-season	San Miguel
Django Rivera	Off-season	N/A
Joey Santamaria	Off-season	Purefoods
Larry Villanil	Off-season	Ginebra

=== Subtractions ===
Player	Signed	New team
#32 Abet Guidaben	September 1993	Shell

=== Recruited imports ===
Name	Tournament	No.	Pos.	Ht.	College	Duration
Kenny Redfield	Commissioner's Cup; Governors Cup	35	Forward	6"5'	Michigan State University	June 13-July 27; October 3-December 10
Anthony Martin	Governors Cup		Center-Forward	6"5'	University of Oklahoma	September 28 (one game)
