= 1993 Coney Island Ice Cream Stars season =

- Head coach: Chot Reyes
- General manager: Domingo Panganiban
- Owner: Purefoods Corporation

All Filipino Cup results
- Record: 16–7 (69.6%)
- Place: 1st
- Playoff finish: Champions

Commissioner's Cup results
- Record: 14–12 (53.8%)
- Place: 2nd
- Playoff finish: Runner-up

Governor's Cup results
- Record: 9–9 (50%)
- Place: 5th
- Playoff finish: Semifinals

Coney Island Ice Cream Stars seasons

The 1993 Coney Island Ice Cream Stars season was the 6th season of the franchise in the Philippine Basketball Association (PBA). It changed its team name to Purefoods Oodles Flavor Noodles in the Commissioner's Cup and returned to Purefoods Tender Juicy Hotdogs in the Governor's Cup.

== Draft picks ==
Round	Pick	Player	College
1	4	Dwight Lago	De La Salle
1	5	Benito Cheng	Mapua
2	11	Olsen Racela	Ateneo de Manila
2	14	Freddie Abuda	University of Cebu

== 3rd PBA title ==
Coney Island won the All-Filipino Cup trophy by defeating the powerhouse San Miguel Beermen, four games to two, in the best-of-seven series. Coach Chot Reyes became the first rookie coach to steer his team to a title. The finals victory was the first by the Purefoods franchise over the Beermen in the championship series.

== Runner-up finish ==
Purefoods lost their first two games in the Commissioner's Cup with Anthony Dewayne Jones as their import. Jones was replaced by Carey Scurry, who led the Oodles to eight wins out of nine games he played. Starting the semifinal round, the Oodles decided to replace Scurry with Ronnie Grandison, who scored only nine points in his PBA debut as Purefoods lost to Swift, 88–90 on August 1. The Oodles had to beat Alaska in the last day of the semifinals to earn a playoff for a finals berth. The Oodles defeated the San Miguel Beermen, 119–101, in the knockout game and advance to the finals for the second time in the season. They lost their bid for a second straight championship when they bowed to Ronnie Thompkins-powered Swift Mighty Meaties in six games for the Commissioner's Cup title.

== Awards ==
- Alvin Patrimonio won his second Most Valuable Player (MVP) trophy in three years.
- Jerry Codiñera and Alvin Patrimonio were named in the Mythical first team selection.

== Roster ==
1993 Purefoods Tender Juicy Hotdogs roster
Players

Pos.	#	POB	Name	Height	Weight	DOB (YYYY–MM–DD)	From
F/C	5 & 6	(Philippines)	Abe King	6 ft 3 in (1.91 m)			San Beda
F	6 & 5	(Philippines)	Joey Guanio	6 ft 1 in (1.85 m)			UP Diliman
F	8	(Philippines)	Freddie Abuda	6 ft 4 in (1.93 m)			Cebu
G/F	9	(Philippines)	Boy Cabahug	5 ft 11 in (1.80 m)			Visayas
G	10	(Philippines)	Dindo Pumaren	5 ft 9 in (1.75 m)			De La Salle
G/F	12	(Philippines)	Glenn Capacio	6 ft 1 in (1.85 m)			Far Eastern
C	14	(Philippines)	Kevin Ramas	6 ft 5 in (1.96 m)			Mapúa
F	15	(Philippines)	Dwight Lago	6 ft 3 in (1.91 m)			De La Salle
F	16	(Philippines)	Alvin Patrimonio	6 ft 3 in (1.91 m)			Mapúa
G	17	(Philippines)	Olsen Racela	5 ft 11 in (1.80 m)			Ateneo
F	18	(Philippines)	Benny Cheng	6 ft 3 in (1.91 m)			Mapúa
G	22	(Philippines)	Frankie Lim	5 ft 11 in (1.80 m)			San Beda
C	44	(Philippines)	Jerry Codinera	6 ft 5 in (1.96 m)			UE

Coaches

Head coach

- (Philippines) Chot Reyes

Assistant coach(es)

- (Philippines) Chito Narvasa

Legend

- (C) Team captain
- Injured

== Transactions ==
=== Additions ===
Player	Signed	Former team
Abe King	Off-season	Presto
Frankie Lim	Off-season	Alaska

=== Recruited imports ===
Name	Tournament	No.	Pos.	Ht.	College	Duration
Anthony Jones	Commissioner's Cup	2	Center-Forward	6”5’	Oral Roberts University	June 15–20
Carey Scurry	Commissioner's Cup	7	Center-Forward	6”7’	Long Island University	June 25 to July 27
Ronnie Grandison	Commissioner's Cup	21	Forward-Center	6”6’	University of New Orleans	August 1 to September 7
Tharon Mayes	Governors Cup	25	Guard-Forward	6”3’	Florida State University	September 28 to November 28

== Win–loss record ==
Season Rank	GP	Win	Lost	Pct.
3rd Overall	67	39	28	0.582
