= Sta. Lucia Realtors =

- Founded: 1993 (PBA)
- Withdrew: 2010
- History: Sta. Lucia Realtors (1993–2010)
- Team colors: Green, orange, white
- Company: Sta. Lucia Realty and Development Corporation
- Board governor: Buddy Encarnado
- Head coaches: see Coaches section
- Ownership: Exequiel Robles
- Championships: PBA: 2 championships 2001 Governors'; 2007–08 Philippine; 3 finals appearances PBL (3); *1990 Philippine Cup; *1992 Maharlika Cup; *1994 Reinforced Conference
Light uniform	Dark uniform

The Sta. Lucia Realtors were a professional basketball team in the Philippine Basketball Association (PBA) from 1993 to 2010. They previously played in the Philippine Basketball League (PBL) from 1987 to 1992.

In 2015, a new Sta. Lucia Realtors team debuted in the inaugural conference of the Pilipinas Commercial Basketball League (PCBL).

== History ==
The Sta. Lucia Realtors began in the Philippine Amateur Basketball League (PABL) in 1986 PABL Filipino Cup, when it played as ESQ-Sta. Lucia, in partnership with ESQ Marketing. The following season, ESQ Marketing left the league and Sta. Lucia played as the Sta. Lucia Realtors. The PABL was renamed the Philippine Basketball League (PBL) in 1990. The Realtors won two PBL championships - the 1990 PBL Philippine Cup and the 1991–1992 PBL Maharlika Cup.

The franchise transferred to the Philippine Basketball Association (PBA) by acquiring the franchise of Great Taste/Presto in 1992 and debuted in the 1993 season.

Sta. Lucia Realtors' logo from 1993 to 2000

Prior to their PBA debut, the franchise was left with a few holdovers from the old Presto lineup including Vergel Meneses, Bong Hawkins (later traded to Swift and Alaska, respectively), and Gerry Esplana. Other players who joined the team within the season (through trades and free agent signings) were Bong Alvarez, Ric Ric Marata, Jack Tanuan and Johnedel Cardel.

Sta. Lucia had the top pick in the draft and selected amateur star Zandro "Jun" Limpot of De La Salle University-Manila. With Limpot carrying the new Sta. Lucia team for the 1993 season, the Realtors managed to surprise everyone with a semi-finals appearance that led to a fourth-place finish in the All-Filipino Cup. Limpot was named as the Rookie of the Year after the season.

One of Sta. Lucia's first imports was Lambert Shell, who played during the Commissioner's Cup. The team's head coach during its first few years was former PBA coach Nat Canson.

=== Limpot/Espino tandem ===
In 1995, Sta. Lucia selected University of Santo Tomas star Dennis Espino as their first round draft pick. But his PBA debut was further delayed after suffering a nose injury during an exhibition game held in the Middle East.

Filipino-American Chris Jackson and Jose Francisco were also acquired in the 1995 draft, veteran shooter Romy dela Rosa later joined the team (via trade in 1994 for Bong Alvarez) to form a solid squad to complement Limpot and Espino.

Espino managed to return to Sta. Lucia late in the season. The Realtors then copped a third-place trophy in the Governor's Cup.

Two more third-place finishes were collected by Sta. Lucia during the 1995 All-Filipino and Commissioner's Cups, with Frederick Pea as import. From 1996, Sta. Lucia captured another third-place finish in the Commissioner's Cup with Adonis Tierra as head coach.

Sta. Lucia's best year was in 1997 when the Realtors finished third in the All-Filipino Cup, and fourth in the Commissioner's Cup and Governor's Cup. The Realtors had Jason Webb as the third overall pick in the 1997 PBA draft and Chot Reyes calling the shots.

Reyes left the team in 1998, replacing him was Derrick Pumaren, Limpot's former coach at La Salle and Magnolia in the PABL. Esplana and Jackson were later traded to Formula Shell for Ronnie Magsanoc. It was at this time when Magsanoc hit his 1,000 career three-pointer. The Realtors entered the semis of the All-Filipino Cup, but were defeated by San Miguel in a do-or-die match for the last finals berth.

The Realtors struggled in the Commissioner's Cup with Ronnie Coleman, brother of then-Philadelphia 76ers forward Derrick Coleman, missing the quarterfinals. Espino and Limpot were later loaned to the Philippine Centennial Team and the Realtors continued to struggle in the Governor's Cup.

In 1999, Limpot and Espino returned for Sta. Lucia but lost Romy dela Rosa to the Metropolitan Basketball Association. The Realtors then added former MBA star and 1992 PBA MVP Ato Agustin with Tierra returning as the head coach. Still, the Realtors placed dead last in the All-Filipino Cup.

Fil-American Robert Parker and his college teammate Kwan Johnson joined the team in the 1999 Commissioner's Cup. The addition of both Parker and Johnson revived the franchise and eventually led to a fourth-place finish in the tournament. However, Parker, along with several other Filipino-American rookies, was targeted by jealous and insecure players and league personalities, and were accused of being Fil-shams. He left the Philippines afterwards out of frustration caused by the issue, and other off the court troubles involving female celebrities, leaving Johnson as Sta. Lucia's import for the Governor's Cup. Sta. Lucia owner Exy Robles and the Realtors management were charged by the government for hiring Parker. The charges were later dropped, as it was proven that the player indeed had legitimate Filipino lineage.

The departure of Parker left the Realtors to a struggling performance in the season-ending Governor's Cup. Johnson was eventually replaced by Joe Temple during the course of the tournament.

=== First championship ===
Before the 2000 season, Limpot was traded to the Barangay Ginebra Kings for Marlou Aquino, to solidify the big man position of the team. Former grand slam-winning coach Norman Black took over as Sta. Lucia's new coach. They also had the number-one pick in the draft and took University of the Philippines guard Paolo Mendoza. The Realtors made it to the quarterfinals of the All-Filipino Cup.

In the Commissioner's Cup, Ansu Sesay was signed by Sta. Lucia as an import. After placing second in the eliminations, they made it to the championship series for the first time in franchise history, only to lose to the talented San Miguel Beermen in five games. Sesay was named as Best Import of the said tournament.

With Joe Temple as import for the Governor's Cup, the Realtors did not make it past the quarterfinals. The same results can be said to the 2001 All-Filipino Cup and Commissioner's Cup.

However, in the Governor's Cup, Sta. Lucia signed Damian Owens as import, and the Realtors quickly dominated the tournament to secure their second finals appearance against the heavily favored San Miguel team.

After both teams split their series in Game Four, the Realtors won both Games 5 and 6. Game Six was tightly contested. After San Miguel import Lamont Strothers tied the game at 72 with an off-balanced runner, Chris Tan hit a 24-foot three-pointer with three seconds remaining to give Sta. Lucia the lead for good. The Game 6 win gave them their first-ever PBA championship with a 75–72 win and a 4–2 series victory.

Owens was then awarded the Best Import of the Conference while Gerard Francisco received the Finals Most Valuable Player award.

=== Decline ===
In 2002, Sta. Lucia was not able to return to the finals in each of the three conferences, thus failing to defend their Governor's Cup crown. After the season, Norman Black announced his resignation as head coach of Sta. Lucia, replacing him with former Tanduay mentor and Black's chief assistant Alfrancis Chua.

Even with the vast array of talent present in his squad, Chua failed to produce a championship in his tenure as the Realtors' coach.

During the 2003 PBA draft, Sta. Lucia shocked everyone by trading their fifth overall pick to Alaska for 1998 MVP and the Aces' star player Kenneth Duremdes. With Duremdes joining Aquino and Espino, the Realtors became one of the favorites to win any of the three conferences in the 29th season.

However, Sta. Lucia placed fourth in the All-Filipino, did not qualify for the special PBA Invitational tournament, and placed another fourth-place finish in the Reinforced Conference. Espino and Aquino, however, made it to the Mythical Team during the annual awards.

In the 2004 PBA Fiesta Conference, with former Purefoods import Derrick Brown as reinforcement, the Realtors blew a double-digit lead to lose to eventual champion Barangay Ginebra Kings in the wildcard knockout phase of the tournament. This caught the ire of Chua, who even brought the whole team to the Commissioner's Office to protest the way officiating was handled.

The Realtors were again eliminated in the wildcard phase of the 2004–2005 Philippine Cup after they were swept by San Miguel. In the 2005 Fiesta Conference, Sta. Lucia blew a twice-to-beat advantage in the wildcard phase and was eliminated by the soon departing Shell Turbo Chargers. Former Cincinnati Bearcat Ryan Fletcher was the Sta. Lucia import during the conference.

In the 2005 PBA draft, Sta. Lucia used the second-overall pick to draft point guard Alex Cabagnot. Cabagnot had a solid performance in the 2005–2006 Fiesta Conference, along with former PBL refugee Chester Tolomia, but Sta. Lucia only managed to finish seventh in the classification phase. The Realtors were swept by Alaska in the quarterfinals, losing the two games by huge margins.

The Realtors finished with a 4–12 record in the classification phase of the Philippine Cup. The Realtors then played in the wildcard playoff phase. However, the Realtors won only one game during the wildcard phase and bowed out of the tournament with a 1–2 record, defeating Talk 'N Text in their final game of the season.

=== 2006–07 season ===
In the off-season, the Sta. Lucia management had a big dispute with their ace point guard Alex Cabagnot, after the latter returned to the United States before a scheduled postseason team meeting. After months of failing to communicate with the team, and also playing for a Los Angeles-based summer league squad, the team handed out an indefinite suspension. But Cabagnot has since mended fences with the Realtors management and was able to play during the season.

During the 2006 PBA draft, the Realtors selected Filipino-American Kelly Williams as its first overall pick in the draft. They also nabbed Mark Isip as sixth overall and Mark Magsumbol as 13th overall in the said draft.

In the Philippine Cup, Sta Lucia was able to pull off a surprising start in the conference, due to great performances by their young player such as Williams, Cabagnot and veterans Marlou Aquino, Dennis Espino, and Kenneth Duremdes. However, a late slump followed a one-game playoff loss to Purefoods that relegated the Realtors to the wildcard phase. Despite a 1–2 win–loss record, Sta. Lucia was able to gain a berth in a knockout game due to their superior record in both the classification and wildcard phase. The Realtors defeated the Air21 Express 121–118 to advance to the quarterfinals for the first time since the 2003 Reinforced Conference. However, Sta Lucia lost 3–1 to Red Bull in the five-game series despite a Game 1 victory.

After the tournament, Alfrancis Chua was relieved of his duties as head coach and was moved to a position as team consultant. He was replaced by assistant coach Boyet Fernandez.

The Realtors paraded Rock Winston as import for the 2006–2007 Fiesta Conference. Sta. Lucia then dealt Kenneth Duremdes, Alex Cabagnot, and Ricky Calimag to Coca-Cola for Denok Miranda, Manny Ramos, and a 2008 second round draft pick. Later in the tournament, they replaced Winston for Jamaal Williams. They went 2–6 with Williams and got booted out in the wild card phase of the tournament by the San Miguel Beermen.

=== 2007–08 season and Sscond championship ===
The Realtors underwent a major overhaul in their roster. Nurse Coach Boyet Fernandez retained only sic players from the previous roster and went on to tap undiscovered talent on the rookie free agent pool. Fernandez decided to get deserving players who have not got the chance to play in the PBA. The Realtors got Ryan Reyes, a standout from the PBL, and John Paul Limpo, from Malolos, Bulacan in the draft. Sta. Lucia also obtained the services of Dennis Daa, Christian Coronel, and Philip Butel from the rookie free agent pool. The team also added former Green Archer Joseph Yeo.

Sta. Lucia ended the elimination round of the All-Filipino Cup with 8 straight wins to get one of the two outright semi-finals slots along with the Purefoods Tender Juicy Giants. In the semifinals that reached the maximum seven games, the Realtors relied on Kelly Williams and Ryan Reyes to barge into their first Philippine Cup finals berth by beating the Alaska Aces. They further shocked PBA aficionados by winning the championship series in seven games against the number one seed Purefoods Tender Juicy Giants to win the 2007–08 PBA Philippine Cup, the second championship title of the franchise since entering the league in 1993. PCU stalwart Nelbert Omolon gunned for 40 points to beat the Air21 Express in their last elimination game. Sta. Lucia won the first automatic semifinal berth and cruised through the playoffs, beating Alaska in the semifinal. The real challenge from the young Realtors team came in the finals when they went 2–0 but lost two straight games. The series went down to the deciding Game 7, with Sta. Lucia winning the game and the series against Purefoods. Kelly Williams was named Conference MVP while Dennis Espino was the Finals MVP.

=== 2009–10 season ===
Due to insufficient funds, Sta. Lucia was forced to make alterations in their roster. They traded Dennis Miranda to San Miguel Beermen for a draft pick and Dennis Espino to Coca-Cola Tigers for Jason Misolas and two second-round draft picks. They signed free agents Josh Urbiztondo, Chris Pacana and Ardy Larong to fill in the slots. Coach Boyet Fernandez was said to be very unhappy of losing their two powerhouse players. On May 13, 2010, after a long trade speculations, Sta. Lucia finally traded Kelly Williams, Ryan Reyes and Charles Waters to Talk n' Text exchange for Nic Belasco, Ali Peek, Pong Escobal, and Ogie Menor and Yousif Aljamal via Barako Bull. Sta Lucia team owner Buddy Encarnado was very sad of releasing their two powerhouse players again. Because of struggling mid-season, the Coca-Cola Tigers acquired former No. 1 pick Paolo Mendoza exchange for rookie Chris Ross.

=== Disbandment ===
In June 2010, there were reports that Meralco expressed interest in joining the PBA and intends to buy either Sta. Lucia's or Barako Bull's franchise after both teams unloaded most of their major players. After Barako Bull informed the board that they intend to stay with the league for the 2010–11 season, Sta. Lucia filed a "leave of absence". On August 10, the PBA board finally approved the sale of the Sta. Lucia franchise to Meralco. It is also announced that Ryan Gregorio will be its head coach.

== "Pure-Filipino" policy ==
Sta. Lucia had a policy of fielding all pure-Filipino lineup, which meant for the team to acquire only those players who have no foreign blood. This was criticized by many PBA fans because of Sta. Lucia's reluctance to improve their team. Some blamed center Marlou Aquino for this implementation. Aquino is a staunch opponent against fake Fil-foreign players that have invaded the PBA since the arrival of Asi Taulava, Eric Menk and others in 1999, in which he had appeared in several Senate committee hearings in the past.

Another conflict is the case of Alex Cabagnot. Cabagnot is considered by many as a Filipino-American after spending his high school and collegiate studies in the United States. However, the PBA listed him as a local player since he was born in the Philippines to Filipino parents. He was the Sta. Lucia Realtors' second overall pick in the 2005 PBA draft.

This policy was later scrapped after the team drafted Filipino-American Kelly Williams in the 2006 PBA draft.

== Final roster ==
Sta. Lucia Realtors roster
Players
Coaches

Pos.	#	POB	Name	Height	Weight	DOB (YYYY–MM–DD)	From
F	1	(United States)	Nic Belasco	6 ft 6 in (1.98 m)	210 lb (95 kg)		Notre Dame (MD)
G	2	(United States)	Joshua Urbiztondo	5 ft 11 in (1.80 m)	180 lb (82 kg)		Fresno Pacific
F	3	(Philippines)	Nelbert Omolon	6 ft 3 in (1.91 m)	185 lb (84 kg)		Philippine Christian
F	5	(Philippines)	Gabby Espinas	6 ft 4 in (1.93 m)	194 lb (88 kg)		Philippine Christian
G	6	(Philippines)	Chris Ross	5 ft 11 in (1.80 m)	170 lb (77 kg)		Marshall
F	7	(Philippines)	Kelvin Gregorio	6 ft 3 in (1.91 m)	190 lb (86 kg)		UE
G	9	(Philippines)	Bonbon Custodio	5 ft 11 in (1.80 m)	165 lb (75 kg)		UE
F	11	(Philippines)	Yousif Aljamal	6 ft 4 in (1.93 m)	205 lb (93 kg)		San Beda
C	13	(Philippines)	Marlou Aquino	6 ft 9 in (2.06 m)	240 lb (109 kg)		Adamson
F	15	(Philippines)	Jason Misolas	6 ft 4 in (1.93 m)	200 lb (91 kg)		Letran
G	18	(Philippines)	Pong Escobal	5 ft 11 in (1.80 m)	180 lb (82 kg)		San Beda
G	22	(United States)	Chris Pacana	6 ft 0 in (1.83 m)	175 lb (79 kg)		Saint Francis of Assisi
G	24	(Philippines)	Donbel Belano	5 ft 8 in (1.73 m)	178 lb (81 kg)		Visayas
G/F	33	(Philippines)	Rogemar Menor	6 ft 2 in (1.88 m)	190 lb (86 kg)		San Beda
F/C	34	(United States)	Ali Peek	6 ft 4 in (1.93 m)	240 lb (109 kg)		Saint Mary's

Head coach

- (Philippines) Boyet Fernandez (CSA–Bacolod)

Assistant coach(es)

- (Philippines) Adonis Tierra (José Rizal)
- (Philippines) Cholo Martin (San Beda)

Legend

- (C) Team captain
- (CI) Commissioner's Cup Import
- (GI) Governors' Cup Import
- (EI) EASL Import
- (DP) Unsigned draft pick
- (FA) Free agent
- (IN) Inactive
- (S) Suspended
- (R) Rookie
- Injured

== Season-by-season records ==
Records from the last three seasons:

Season	Conference	Elim./clas. round				Playoffs	
Season	Conference	Finish	W	L	%	Stage	Results
Sta. Lucia Realtors
2007–2008	Philippine Cup	2nd	12	6	.667	Semifinals; Finals	Sta. Lucia 4, Alaska 3 Sta. Lucia 4, Purefoods 3
2007–2008	Fiesta Conference	9th	7	11	.389	1st wildcard round 2nd wildcard round Quarterfinals	Sta. Lucia 99, Alaska 86*; Sta. Lucia 111, Talk 'N Text 96*; Barangay Ginebra 2, Sta. Lucia 0
2008–2009	Philippine Cup	5th	10	8	.556	Quarterfinals; Semifinals; 3rd-place playoff	Sta. Lucia 2, Rain or Shine 0 Alaska 4, Sta. Lucia 2 Sta. Lucia 100, San Miguel 97 (OT)*
2008–2009	Fiesta Conference	5th	7	7	.500	Wildcard phase Quarterfinals	Sta. Lucia 94, Coca-Cola 88; Burger King 2, Sta. Lucia 1
2009–2010	Philippine Cup	6th	10	8	.556	1st wildcard round	Rain or Shine 90, Sta. Lucia 86*
2009–2010	Fiesta Conference	8th	5	13	.278	1st wildcard round	Coca-Cola 100, Sta. Lucia 84*
Elimination/classification round			51	54	.486	4 post-wildcard appearances	
Playoffs			17	17	.500	1 championship	

*one-game playoffs

== Awards ==
=== Individual awards ===
PBA Most Valuable Player	Finals MVP	PBA Best Player of the Conference
Kelly Williams (2007-08)	Gerard Francisco (2001 Governors'); Dennis Espino (2007-08 Philippine)	Kelly Williams (2007-08 Philippine)
PBA Rookie of the Year	PBA All-Defensive Team	PBA Mythical First Team
Jun Limpot (1993); Kelly Williams (2006-07); Ryan Reyes (2007-08)	Jun Limpot (1993); Chris Jackson (1995, 1996); Marlou Aquino (2001, 2003); Dennis Espino (2001, 2004-05); Nelbert Omolon (2006-07); Ryan Reyes (2007-08); Kelly Williams (2007-08)	Dennis Espino (2001, 2003); Kelly Williams (2006-07, 2007-08)
PBA Mythical Second Team	PBA Sportsmanship Award	PBA Best Import
Jun Limpot (1993, 1997); Marlou Aquino (2000, 2003); Nelbert Omolon (2007-08); Kelly Williams (2008-09)	Paolo Mendoza (2002); Ryan Reyes (2008-09)	Ansu Sesay (2000 Commissioner's); Damian Owens (2001 Governors')

=== PBA Press Corps individual awards ===
Executive of the Year	Baby Dalupan of the Year	Defensive Player of the Year
Buddy Encarnado (2000, 2007-08)	Boyet Fernandez (2007-08)	Dennis Espino (2004-05)
Bogs Adornado Comeback Player of the Year	All-Rookie Team	
Paul Alvarez (1993)	Kelly Williams (2006-07); Ryan Reyes (2007-08); Josh Urbiztondo (2009-10)	

=== All-Star Weekend ===
Obstacle Challenge	Slam Dunk Contest
Rob Johnson (2003, 2004)	Rob Parker (1999); Kelly Williams (2008)

== Players of note ==
=== PBA 40 greatest players ===
- Marlou Aquino #13
- Kenneth Duremdes #19
- Ronnie Magsanoc #5
- Kelly Williams #21

=== Other notable players ===
- Francis Adriano
- Donbel Belano
- Philip Butel
- Alex Cabagnot
- Boy Cabahug
- Aramis Calpito
- Christian Coronel
- Gabby Cui
- Dennis Daa
- Angelo David
- Andy De Guzman
- Richard del Rosario
- Romeo dela Rosa
- Maximo Delantes
- Gilbert Demape
- Dennis Espino
- Gerald Esplana
- Noynoy Falcasantos
- Boyet Fernandez
- Gerald Francisco
- Jose Francisco
- Arnold Gamboa
- Norman Gonzales
- Roberto Jabar
- Chris Jackson
- Peter Jao
- Jun Limpot
- Edgar Macaraya
- Gilbert Mamaklay
- Jojo Martin
- Paolo Mendoza
- Vergel Meneses
- Dennis Miranda
- Nelbert Omolon
- Michael Orquillas
- Marvin Ortiguerra
- Ali Peek
- Eugene Quilban
- Ryan Reyes
- Omanzie Rodriguez
- Jack Santiago
- Chris Tan
- Hercules Tangkay
- Melchor Teves
- Chito Victolero
- Rob Wainwright
- Jason Webb
- Joseph Yeo

== Coaches ==
=== PABL ===
- Nemie Villegas (1987–1989)
- Francis Rodriguez (1989–1992)

=== PBA ===
- Nat Canson (1993–1995)
- Adonis Tierra (1996–1997, 1999)
- Chot Reyes (1997)
- Derrick Pumaren (1998)
- Norman Black (2000–2002)
- Alfrancis Chua (2003–2007)
- Boyet Fernandez (2007–2010)

== See also ==
- Sta. Lucia Realtors (PCBL)
- Sta. Lucia Lady Realtors (PSL volleyball team)
- Pasig Sta. Lucia Realtors (MPBL)

Preceded by Great Taste Coffee Makers	PBA teams genealogies 1993–2010	Succeeded by Meralco Bolts
Preceded by San Miguel Beermen	PBA Governors Cup Champions; 2001	Succeeded by Purefoods TJ Hotdogs
Preceded by Barangay Ginebra Kings	PBA Philippine Cup Champions; 2007–2008	Succeeded by Talk 'N Text Tropang Texters
