= San Miguel Beermen =

Philippine professional basketball team

- 2025–26 San Miguel Beermen season
- Founded: 1975
- History: Royal Tru-Orange (1975–1980); Gold Eagle Beermen (1984); Magnolia Ice Cream Makers (1985, 1987); Magnolia Quench Plus (1985); Magnolia Cheese Makers (1986); Magnolia Beverage Masters (2007–08); Petron Blaze Boosters (2011–2014); San Miguel Beermen (1981–1983, 1987–2007, 2008–2011, 2014–present)
- Team colors: Red, black, white
- Company: San Miguel Brewery
- Board governor: Robert Non
- Team manager: Gee Abanilla; Daniel Henares (assistant)
- Head coach: Leo Austria
- Team captain: June Mar Fajardo
- Ownership: Ramon S. Ang
- Championships: 31 championships List: 1979 Open 1982 Invitational 1987 Reinforced 1988 Open 1988 Reinforced 1989 Open 1989 All-Filipino 1989 Reinforced 1992 All-Filipino 1993 Governors' 1994 All-Filipino 1999 Commissioner's 1999 Governors' 2000 Commissioner's 2000 Governors' 2001 All-Filipino 2005 Fiesta 2009 Fiesta 2011 Governors' 2014–15 Philippine 2015 Governors' 2015–16 Philippine 2016–17 Philippine 2017 Commissioner's 2017–18 Philippine 2019 Philippine 2019 Commissioner's 2022 Philippine 2023–24 Commissioner's 2025 Philippine 2025–26 Philippine 47 Finals appearances
- Retired numbers: 7 (8, 9, 12, 14, 17, 19, 29)
Light jersey	Dark jersey

The San Miguel Beermen (colloquially known as SMB) are a Philippine professional basketball team owned by the San Miguel Corporation. The team competes in the Philippine Basketball Association (PBA) and is the only active founding member, operating in the league since 1975.

The team won its first two championships at the 1979 Open Conferance and the 1982 Invitational, but had their first successful run from 1987 to 1994 with nine titles under head coach Norman Black with Ramon Fernandez and Ato Agustin. In the 1989 season, this run included the first-ever Grand Slam in league history, followed by another six titles from 1999 to 2001 with Jong Uichico at the helm and Danny Ildefonso, Danny Seigle, and Olsen Racela leading the roster.

The team's success slowed in the early 2000's. Uichico left in 2006, and the team rotated between multiple head coaches. They won three titles between 2002 and 2014. In 2014, the team signed Leo Austria as head coach, and together with a roster led by June Mar Fajardo, Arwind Santos, and Alex Cabagnot, the team returned to its dominant form by winning 12 titles since 2015. During that run, the team won five straight Philippine Cups from 2015 to 2019; the team kept permanent possession of the Jun Bernardino Trophy for the first three wins, becoming the second team to do so after the Talk 'N Text Tropang Texters (now TNT Tropang 5G) in 2013. During this streak, in the 2015–16 Philippine Cup Finals, the team became the first professional basketball team in history to overcome a 3–0 series deficit to win a best-of-seven playoff series.

The San Miguel Beermen are the most successful team in the PBA with 31 championships and over 1,400 all-time wins, more than any other team in the league. They are also one of three teams under the SMC umbrella along with Barangay Ginebra San Miguel and the Magnolia Chicken Timplados Hotshots.

== History ==
=== Background ===
Before the PBA, San Miguel had a basketball team in the Manila Industrial and Commercial Athletic Association (MICAA). The MICAA was a multi-sport league similar to collegiate leagues such as the UAAP and the NCAA, but basketball became the popular sport.

The San Miguel Braves (or the Greenshirts) never won a MICAA title but they did figure in the championship three times. In the 1970s, San Miguel won two National Seniors titles in 1973 and 1976. The 1973 champion team were composed of Manny Paner, David Regullano, Estoy Estrada, Yoyong Martirez and Ramon Fernandez, who later that year joined a new MICAA team Toyota Comets.

San Miguel was one of the nine companies which formed the first professional basketball league outside of the United States known as the Philippine Basketball Association in 1975.

=== 1975–1986: First decade ===
==== 1975–1980: Royal Tru-Orange era ====
With the formation of the PBA, San Miguel retained its MICAA ballclub but their PBA team will carry the name Royal Tru Orange, then a soft drink brand owned by San Miguel. The Orangemen placed fourth in all three conferences of the PBA's first season. The team was bannered by center Manny Paner, forward Estoy Estrada and point guard Yoyong Martirez. Both Paner and Estrada made it to the Mythical Team in the league's inaugural season.

Royal had its first best finish of third place in the 1976 second conference as they paraded the high-scoring Carl Bird as one of their imports. Bird was the league's first 70-point man as he scored 73 points in RTO's 165–129 win over N-Rich on October 12, 1976, only to be broken two weeks after by 7-Up's Harry Rogers.

The Orangemen would suffer their worst seasons in the next two years with Manny Paner moving out upon becoming the first PBA player to be offered a lucrative contract by Presto Ice Cream and he signed with the team in the 1977 PBA season. Estoy Estrada left to join the Toyota Tamaraws in the following year in 1978. Olympian Edgardo Ocampo replaced coach Ignacio Ramos at the RTO bench at the start of the season.

In 1979, Royal Tru-Orange finally made it to the top during the Open Conference. The team had two of their tallest players playing together – 6'9 Otto Moore and 6'7 Larry Pounds. They faced Toyota in the second conference finals and won the best of five title series in four games, becoming the second team after U/Tex Wranglers to break the Crispa-Toyota stranglehold as far as winning championships. Moore and Pounds were backstopped by a crew made up of Visayan cagers like Yoyong Martirez, Marlowe Jacutin and Jess Migalbin, along with Tony Torrente, Rudy Lalota and Leonardo Paguntalan.

==== 1980–1983: First San Miguel Beermen era ====
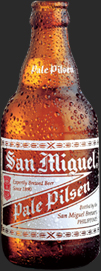
In 1981, the team was renamed to San Miguel Beermen for the first time. It is named after San Miguel Beer, the team's namesake product for most of its history since.

When coach Tommy Manotoc replaced Ed Ocampo as the team's head coach beginning the 1981 season, the ball club were back in the final four since their title-conquest in 1979. The Beermen had former U/Tex imports James Robinson and Aaron James and placed fourth in the 1981 PBA Open.

The following year in 1982, San Miguel had one of their best seasons with two finals trips. The Beermen acquired three players from the defunct CDCP quintet during the pre-season; Renato Lobo, Anthony Dasalla and the returning Manny Paner. The team also signed former Tefilin import Norman Black as their import for the season. San Miguel almost won the first conference crown as they led 3–2 in the best of seven title series against Toyota Super Corollas but lost in seven games. The Beermen bounce back a month later by winning the Asian Invitational championship, defeating Crispa Redmanizers, two games to one, in the best of three series. That team remains as the only squad the multi-titled Crispa never beat in a PBA finale. One of SMB's rookies, Marte Saldana, won Rookie of the year honors at the end of the season.

Manotoc moved to Crispa in 1983 and replacing him in the Beermen bench is former national coach Nat Canson.

==== 1984: Gold Eagle Beermen era ====
The team was renamed as Gold Eagle Beermen for the 1984 season. The SMC ballclub had found a corporate rival with the entry of Asia Brewery's Beer Hausen Brewmasters, which had taken over the disbanded Toyota franchise. Despite Gold Eagle acquiring the services of Toyota's top forward Abe King and signing two rookies; Joey Loyzaga and Dante Gonzalgo, the team placed second to last at the bottom of the cumulative team standings.

==== 1985–1986: First Magnolia era ====
In 1985, the franchise carried another name as Magnolia Ice Cream (Magnolia was then a division of San Miguel Corporation), a name SMC first used with their team in the Philippine Amateur Basketball League (PABL). Former import Norman Black returned to the squad and this time, he was not only their import but as the team's playing coach. The Ice Cream Makers made it to the Open Conference finals against powerhouse Great Taste Coffee Makers and lost in six games. In the Reinforced Conference, the team became known as Magnolia Quench Plus. The Thirst Quenchers were booted out of the semifinals by Great Taste in a playoff game.

The franchise filed for a leave of absence from the league after the 1985 season. In the aftermath of the People Power Revolution, San Miguel Corporation chairman Danding Cojuangco fled the country.

At the start of the 1986 season, some Magnolia players were absorbed by different teams, newcomer Alaska Milkmen acquired three from Magnolia and signed Norman Black to a one-year contract. After a two-conference leave, the SMC franchise returned in the third conference and were known as Magnolia Cheese. The new lineup consisted of eight players from the former NCC team; Hector Calma, Samboy Lim, Yves Dignadice, Franz Pumaren, Elmer Reyes, Alfie Almario, Pido Jarencio and Tonichi Yturri. Only Manny Paner was the only holdover from the previous Magnolia team. They also signed two players straight from the amateur ranks; Alvin Teng and Jeffrey Graves.

=== 1987–1994: The Ramon Fernandez era ===
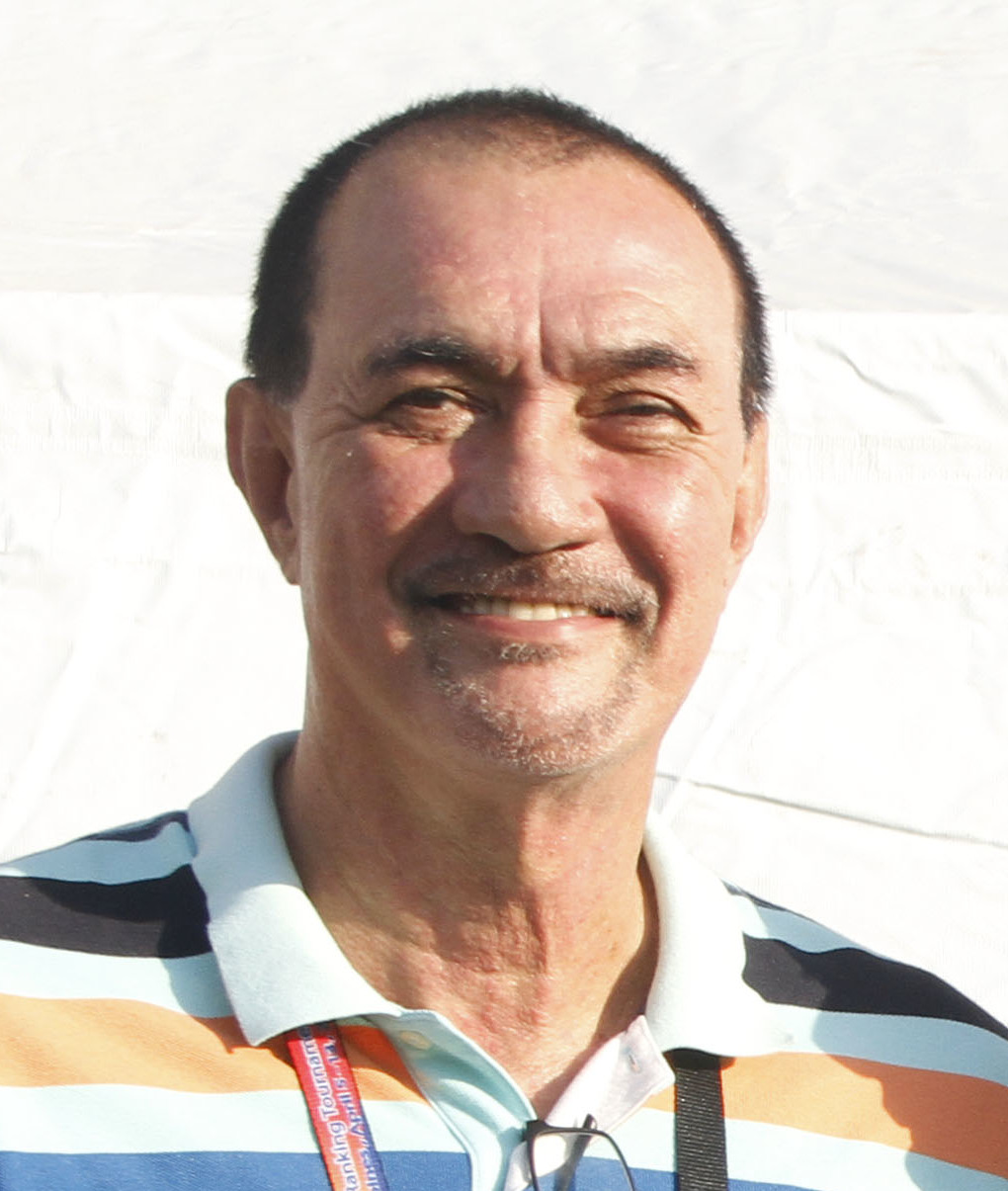
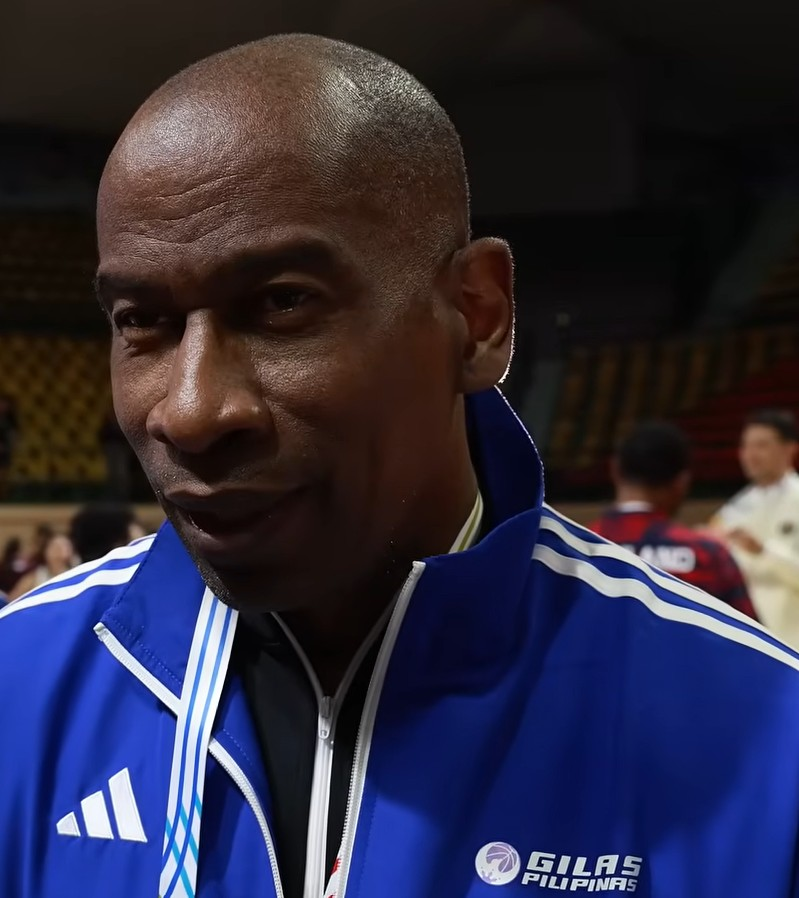
Following the signings of Ramon Fernandez (left) as a player-coach in 1997 and the acquisition of Norman Black (right) a year later, the Beermen became dominant during the late 1980s and early 1990s with nine championships during that span.

==== 1987: The return of the Beermen under Norman Black ====
In 1987, league pioneer Abet Guidaben was acquired by Magnolia, along with Ricky Cui from the disbanded Manila Beer. Playing-coach Norman Black was back in the helm for the Ice Cream Makers and led the team to third-place finishes in the first and second conferences.

The team reverted to its old name San Miguel Beer in the 1987 Reinforced Conference. They wore green and white colours instead of traditional red and white jerseys they used in the early 1980s. They got an import: Bobby Parks from Memphis State University. Parks led the Beermen to its third PBA title, defeating Hills Bros. Center Abet Guidaben won his second Most Valuable Player award

==== 1988–1994: Ramon Fernandez joins the Beermen and the Grand Slam ====
San Miguel acquired Ricardo Brown from Great Taste through an offer sheet beginning the 1988 PBA season and they continued their winning ways by capturing the Open Conference crown, defeating newcomer Purefoods Hotdogs, who were aiming for a cinderella finish, in a classic, seven-game series. After placing fourth in the All-Filipino Conference, the Beermen traded Abet Guidaben to Purefoods for Ramon Fernandez. The trade was executed in the height of a disagreement between Fernandez and the Purefoods management.

The Beermen with Norman Black and Michael Phelps as their imports, won another championship and retains the Reinforced Conference title by defeating the Bobby Parks led-Shell Rimula-X in five games. Ramon Fernandez won his fourth Most Valuable Player Award at the end of the season.

In 1989, the Beermen added two rookies in their lineup whom the team drafted during the pre-season, shooting-guard Renato Agustin and forward Bobby Jose.

The All-Filipino Conference finals between San Miguel and Purefoods Hotdogs featured local players competing for the All-Filipino title. San Miguel included Ramon Fernandez, while Purefoods featured Alvin Patrimonio, Jojo Lastimosa, and Jerry Codinera. The series also featured a matchup between coaches Norman Black and Baby Dalupan. San Miguel won the series in six games after losing Game One. San Miguel won the All-Filipino title on September 3, 1989, outscoring Purefoods in the final quarter, 43–32, for a 128–109 victory. The win occurred three days after San Miguel lost Game Five in overtime.

Only one conference was left to achieve the grandslam and San Miguel brought in Keith Smart as their import for the Third Conference. After five games in the eliminations, Smart was replaced by Ennis Whatley. The Beermen defeated sister team Añejo Rum 65 that has a high-scoring import in Carlos Briggs, four games to one, in the Reinforced Conference finals as they completed a three-conference sweep, becoming the third team to capture the PBA grandslam.

Entering the new decade, the San Miguel Beermen failed to defend all their titles in the 1990 PBA season. During the third conference when four of their starters along with coach Norman Black missed the first few games due to their commitment in the all-pro national team. The team never recovered upon their return and San Miguel was eliminated for the first time in the semifinals since rejoining the league in 1986.

It wasn't until 1992 when the Beermen would win another championship, defeating Purefoods TJ Hotdogs in another classic seven-game series for the All-Filipino crown. In the first conference that year, the Beermen made a return trip to the finals but were beaten by Shell Rimula X in five games.

The 1993 season turned out to be another fruitful year for San Miguel. The 'triggerman' Allan Caidic from the disbanded Presto franchise was happy to rejoin some of his former NCC teammates at San Miguel and they were labeled anew as the team to beat in the All-Filipino Conference (AFC became the first conference of the season), what with the deadly trio of Caidic, Samboy Lim and 1992 season MVP Ato Agustin. The Beermen went on to play their old rival Purefoods, renamed Coney Island Ice Cream Stars, for the All-Filipino title. Alvin Patrimonio, playing at his peak and aching to get back at their two-time All-Filipino tormentors, led the Stars to victory and the Beermen were outclassed in six games.

San Miguel didn't go home empty-handed in 1993 as they capture the third conference crown, known as Governors Cup, at the expense of the Tony Harris-led Swift Mighty Meaties. The Beermen became the first back-to-back champions in the 1990s by regaining the All-Filipino title the following year in 1994, reversing the outcome against defending champion Coney Island, winning in six games. The title-victory earned San Miguel the right to represent the country in the basketball competition in the 1994 Asian Games in Hiroshima, Japan. Injuries among the players hounded the team for the rest of the season.

=== 1995–1997: Decline and Norman Black's departure ===
In 1995, San Miguel was struggling to maintain its ranks as among the best teams in the league with Sunkist and Alaska dominating at the time. All superstars Allan Caidic, Samboy Lim, Ato Agustin were injured and to cover the scoring gap Alvin Teng was traded to Seven Up for Gido Babilonia and Victor Pablo after All Filipino Conference. Acquired Freddie Abuda from Purefoods, drafted Lou Regidor, Mike Mustre, Matt Makalintal, Gilbert Castillo and Bryant Punzalan. Though the beermen didn't prosper on first two conferences but in Governors' Conference with Kenny Travis back as import San Miguel broke Sunkist's dream of a grandslam by entering the finals of the Governors' Cup, only to lose to Alaska in a seven-game showdown.

San Miguel's struggles would continue in 1996, the team finished third in the All-Filipino while nabbing fourth in the season-ending Governors' Cup. Early in the year, San Miguel traded Ato Agustin to Sunkist for known-scorer Nelson Asaytono and traded Victor Pablo to Shell for Paul "Mr. Excitement" Alvarez. The third conference saw the arrival of Lamont Strothers to the PBA.

After the 1996 season, Norman Black left the team and became the head coach of Mobiline. Replacing him was former NCC coach Ron Jacobs. Before the 1997 season began, controversy surrounded the hiring of Ron Jacobs, due to objections by the Basketball Coaches Association of the Philippines (BCAP). The BCAP believed that it endangered the chance of local coaches to enter the PBA. But, Jacobs remained coach of San Miguel for the league's 23rd season.

With San Miguel in a sort of a rebuilding mode, Jacobs was able to mold young players like Olsen Racela who was acquired from Purefoods, Mike Mustre as well as veterans Asaytono, "Mr. Excitement" Bong Alvarez, Dignadice and Art dela Cruz into a strong team each conference. San Miguel won third place in all three conferences of the '97 campaign. The Beermen failed to enter the finals in the Commissioner's and Governors' Cups, respectively, losing in two do-or-die games against Gordon's Gin and Purefoods. Jeff Ward was the import during the second conference while Larry Robinson played for SMB in the third conference.

Asaytono was a candidate to win the Most Valuable Player Award but lost to Purefoods' Alvin Patrimonio.

=== 1998–2013: The Danny Ildefonso era ===
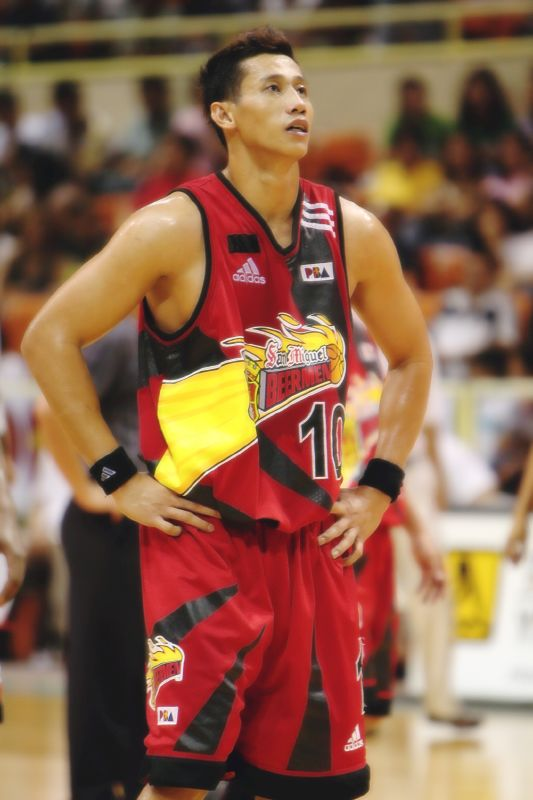
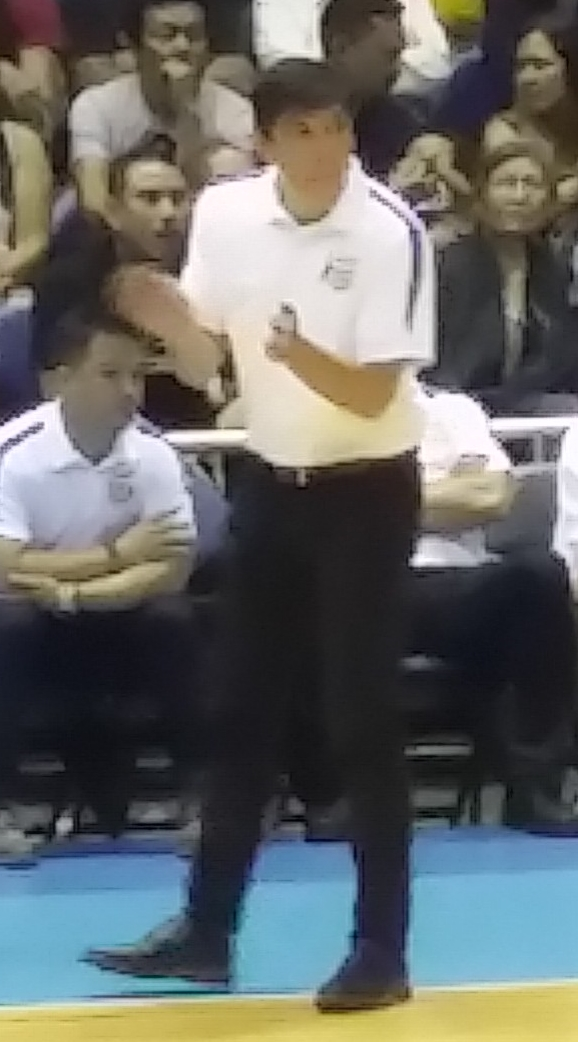
SMB acquired Danny Ildefonso (left) in 1998 while Jong Uichico was appointed head coach in the following off-season. The two would become key figures in the team's return to its winning prowess at the turn of the millennium.

==== 1998: Return to form ====
For the 1998 season, San Miguel drafted Noy Castillo as the second overall pick in the draft. But, Castillo was quickly shipped to Shell in exchange for National University standout Danny Ildefonso.

The Beermen made a strong showing in the All-Filipino Cup but lost to Alaska in the Finals in seven games. In the Commissioner's Cup, San Miguel brought back Strothers to replace Jeff Ward during the tournament. SMB made its return to the finals but was defeated by the Milkmen in the rematch of the All-Filipino Cup, this time in six games.

After the conference, Racela was loaned to the PBA Centennial team. As incentive, all PBA teams were allowed to hire two imports in the Governors' Cup. Strothers and Robinson teamed up for San Miguel, but with their height disadvantage against other teams, the Beermen failed to either win the special Centennial Cup or the season-ending Governors' Cup.

Ron Jacobs resigned after two seasons with the Beermen. His assistant coach and former NCC protégé Jong Uichico took over as head coach.

==== 1999–2001: Jong Uichico's arrival ====
New coach Jong Uichico began his first season with San Miguel in 1999. As part of the PBA's new rule to allow each team one direct-hire Filipino-foreigner, San Miguel acquired the services of Danny Seigle, younger brother of then Mobiline center Andy Seigle, to bolster the team along with former Pop Cola guard Boybits Victoria.

However, San Miguel struggled in the All-Filipino Cup and was eliminated in the quarterfinals by Formula Shell. One of their finest moments was during a match against Mobiline and star center Asi Taulava. San Miguel's 67–66 squeaker on Asaytono's two clutch free-throws handed the Phone Pals its first defeat after winning their first seven games.

In the Commissioner's Cup, San Miguel tapped former Mobiline import Terquin Mott. Mott, a known temperamental player during his first stint in the league, molded well with his local teammates as San Miguel was able to make a strong showing in the elimination round. San Miguel also parted way with Asaytono, shipping him to Pop Cola for Nic Belasco and Dwight Lago. The Beermen upset the defending champion Alaska Milkmen in the semis to enter the Finals against All-Filipino winner Formula Shell with Benjie Paras and import John Best. San Miguel won the first two games of the series before Shell tied the series at 2–2. But the Beermen won the last two games to win their 12th PBA crown and their first in five years.

In the Governors' Cup, San Miguel brought back Strothers as the Beermen cruised into the Finals of the said tournament against Alaska. The Milkmen even led the series at 2–1 but San Miguel was able to win the last three games to win their second straight championship in six games.

Seigle was named as the Rookie of the Year at season's end and also threatened to beat Paras for the MVP plum, but the "Tower of Power" won the 1999 MVP award.

San Miguel failed to win the 2000 All-Filipino Cup by finishing fourth in the tournament. The Beermen, however, defended the Commissioner's Cup trophy, with NBA veteran Stephen Howard on the lineup, defeating Sta. Lucia. In the Governors' Cup, with Strothers back, they defeated Purefoods in five games for their 15th PBA title. Danny Ildefonso won his first Most Valuable Player Award at the end of the season.

In 2001, they were favorites to win the All-Filipino Cup and San Miguel did so to enter the finals against sister team Barangay Ginebra and prized rookie Mark Caguioa. After the series was tied at 2–2, SMB survived in overtime to win Game Five and blew out the Kings in Game Six to capture their first All-Filipino title in seven years.

San Miguel was now favored to win the grand slam, but the young Batang Red Bull Thunder upset SMB in the finals of the Commissioner's Cup in six games while the Sta. Lucia Realtors, behind former SMB mentor Norman Black defeated his former club 4–2 in the season-ending Governors' Cup.

Ildefonso, meanwhile won his second consecutive MVP in 2001. Some observers though believed that it was Danny Seigle who deserved to win the award.

==== 2002–2006: The later Jong Uichico years ====
Ildefonso, Racela, newly acquired Dondon Hontiveros, Seigle and coach Jong Uichico concentrated their time with the RP National team in the 2002 season. Meanwhile, San Miguel was left with only Dorian Peña and Boybits Victoria on the team. San Miguel fielded in Strothers and later former NBA veteran Mario Bennett for the Governors' Cup. After the Beermen finished eighth in the elimination round, SMB upset the Talk 'N Text Phone Pals in the quarterfinals but was eliminated by Alaska in the semi-finals and finished fourth in the tournament. Strothers announced his retirement after the tournament.

In the Commissioner's Cup, San Miguel took Shea Seals and Art Long as import. But the temperamental Long got into a dirty scuffle with Red Bull import Antonio Lang during a game despite San Miguel finishing fourth after the elimination phase. Terquin Mott replaced Long before the end of the eliminations. After eliminating Coca-Cola in the quarters, Red Bull eliminated them in the semis before finishing third.

In the All-Filipino, San Miguel was decimated by Danny Seigle's injury with the national team. Racela, Ildefonso and Hontiveros returned for San Miguel but they were eliminated by Coca-Cola in the semis to finished third for the second-straight conference.

San Miguel returned in the 2003 on a bright note. After the elimination round of the All-Filipino, they finished first in Group A to qualify for the quarterfinals phase of the tournament. But the Beermen failed to enter the semis after finishing 1–2 in the single-round robin format. Their great finish in the All-Filipino helped the Beermen qualify for the Invitational tournament, but San Miguel failed to advance to the semis.

In the first Reinforced Conference in more than a decade, San Miguel fielded in several lemon imports before settling on former Sta. Lucia import Kwan Johnson. After a 0–5 start, San Miguel went 10–3 the rest of the way to enter the Finals, but lost in seven games to the Coca-Cola Tigers.

San Miguel was once again favorites to win championships in the 2004–05 season. Art Long made his return as import for San Miguel in the 2004 Fiesta Conference, a transition tournament. Long and the Beermen powered its way to a 9–0 start before finishing the tournament in first place after the eliminations. But once again, San Miguel failed to enter the semis after a 1–2 record in the quarterfinals.

In the 2004–2005 Philippine Cup (formerly the All-Filipino Cup), the Beermen finished the classification phase with an even 9–9 record. In the quarterfinals, San Miguel swept the Sta. Lucia Realtors in a three-game series. Then, the Beermen also swept Alaska in the quarterfinals. In the semis against sister rival Barangay Ginebra, the Beermen took a 2–1 series in the best-of-five affair but the Kings won the next two games to win the series, that capped with Rodney Santos' game-winner in the deciding game. The Beermen then beat Shell to cop third-place in the tournament.

Chris Burgess was San Miguel's import for the 2005 Fiesta Conference. San Miguel finished the classification phase in second place to gain an outright semi-finals berth. Midway to the semis, Burgess was replaced by Ace Custis and became an effective replacement for San Miguel. The Beermen eliminated Red Bull in the semi-finals to enter the Finals against the Talk 'N Text Phone Pals. The Beermen defeated the Phone Pals 4–1 to give the team its 17th PBA title in team history and ended its four-year title drought; it was also the first time in their last six championships that they've won a title with Danny Seigle as a non-factor in the playoffs. He was injured for almost the entire semi-finals and played only in Game 5 of the Finals. It was Jong Uichico's sixth PBA crown as coach.

After their performance a year ago, San Miguel was heavily favored in the 2005–06 Fiesta Conference to defend their crown. They added import Rico Hill to bolster the lineup along with former Shell Turbo Charger Chris Calaguio.

But SMB's high expectations became a disappointment. The Beermen started off with a 0–4 record before winning a game against the Air21 Express in Aklan. Hill was replaced by Kwan Johnson but the Beermen lost four more games to fall to 1–8. But the Beermen won the next five games; Johnson was suffering an injury and was temporarily replaced by Kevin Freeman. The Beermen finished with a 6–10 card and eighth place in the nine-team classification phase.

Johnson returned in time for San Miguel against ten-sister team Coca-Cola in the survivor round. The Beermen had a twice to beat edge, but the Tigers won the first encounter on January 6. A day later, Ildefonso's game-winner propelled the Beermen to the next round. In the Wildcard phase against the Express, they ended up losing in three games.

Before the start of the 2006 PBA Philippine Cup, San Miguel traded its veteran forward Nic Belasco to the Alaska Aces for guard Brandon Cablay. In a separate move, the Beermen acquired Wesley Gonzales from the Air21 Express and shipped Eugene Tejada to sister team Purefoods. The Express was supposed to send Homer Se to Purefoods but failed to pass his physical test, and was returned to the Air21 squad. The Cablay trade was seen as a preparation for the possible retirement of point guard Olsen Racela.

After a 1–2 start in the tournament, the Beermen won the next eight games before finishing with an 11–5 record. Their second place tally sent the Beermen to an outright semifinals berth, a huge improvement from their disappointing run in the Fiesta Conference. The Beermen's surge also saw Danny Seigle's numerous scoring outburst, norming 20 points in almost all of the games he played during the conference.

However, in the semifinals, they were upset by the Red Bull Barako in seven games. San Miguel won Games 2, 4 and the sixth game to level the matchup to a seventh game. However, in Game 7, the Beermen lost on a last second shot by Junthy Valenzuela, eliminating them from the tournament. In a one-game matchup for third place, San Miguel lost to Alaska 102–95 to finish fourth in the 2006 Philippine Cup.

==== 2007–2009: The early post-Uichico years and a brief name change ====
In the offseason, the San Miguel Corporation moved national team head coach Chot Reyes to the Beermen as its head coach while sending Jong Uichico to coach the Barangay Ginebra Kings. In the 2006 PBA Rookie Draft, the Beermen selected LA Tenorio (fourth overall pick) and Gabby Espinas (fifth overall pick) in one of the rare incidents in which San Miguel drafted players from the rookie draft.

After a 0–3 start in the tournament plus the injuries of Seigle and Ildefonso, the Beermen received Rommel Adducul and Lordy Tugade from Ginebra and Red Bull, respectively, in a three-team trade. This led to San Miguel winning 13 of the next 15 games to finished with a 13–5 record and an outright semifinals berth.

In the semis, the Beermen defeated Red Bull in seven games that was highlighted by the physical encounters of both squad in the series which also involved Red Bull's head man Yeng Guiao. In the Finals, after leading the series 2–0 the Beermen were beaten by the Barangay Ginebra Kings in six games.

In the recent 2007 Fiesta Conference, Chot Reyes took a leave to form and coach the national basketball team for the FIBA Asia Championships. For a few games, Biboy Ravanes was hired as the team's interim coach but soon San Miguel faltered to a slow start.

Soon, former Ginebra head coach and assistant coach Siot Tanquingcen was moved to the Beermen to be its interim tactician. However, fortunes didn't change as they suffered to a horrible 0–6 start and later 2–8 after fielding imports Vidal Messiah and Paul McMillan.

But then, San Miguel soon won eight games with the arrival of the team's third import, former Alaska Ace Galen Young. SMB wound up with a 10–8 win–loss card to end the elimination round, only to lose to Alaska in the eliminations, and to Air21 in a knockout match for the second outright quarterfinals berth.

At this time, the Beermen shipped Rommel Adducul to Red Bull for prized center Enrico Villanueva in a controversial trade which also involved sister team Purefoods, which snagged Adducul after trading reserve Don Camaso.

SMB was relegated to the wild-card playoffs but beat Sta. Lucia in the first knockout game of the phase and then pulled off the first of what was dubbed as the "Beeracle Run" over Coca-Cola in which they came back from a four-point deficit with 12 seconds to go to advance against Ginebra in the quarters.

There, the Beermen exacted revenge on the Barangay Ginebra Kings by beating them in three full games. The Beermen entered the Fiesta Conference semifinals only to lose to Alaska in six hard fought games and placed fourth in a loss to Red Bull for the consolation third-place trophy.

After 20 years of carrying the San Miguel name, the San Miguel Corporation radically changed the team name to Magnolia Beverage Masters starting the 2007–08 PBA season.

Prior to the change, they named Tanquingcen as coach while they acquired Larry Fonacier from Red Bull. In the 2007 PBA draft, Samigue Eman and Jonas Villanueva were taken in the first round.

Former first over-all pick Mike Cortez and Ken Bono were dealt by Alaska for Beverage Masters LA Tenorio and Larry Fonacier in a blockbuster trade.

In what could be one of the biggest single-day trade in PBA history, Magnolia acquired Marc Pingris from Purefoods in exchange for a future draft pick.

In 2008, the team again reverted to its old name, the San Miguel Beermen.

In the 2008 PBA draft, the team used its 3rd pick in the 1st round to select 5-foot-11 point guard Jayson Castro, then traded Jayson Castro to Talk 'N Text for the 6-foot-7 guard/forward Jay Washington. They also drafted 5-foot-11 point guard Bonbon Custodio using their 8th pick in the 1st round. They have also acquired 6-foot-9 center Mick Pennisi from Red Bull in exchange for their 2010 1st round draft pick.

In the Philippine Cup the team managed to have the 6th seed and they managed to beat the Crowd favorite Barangay Ginebra Kings but eventually lost to semifinals to the Talk 'N Text Tropang Texters.

In their first game in the 2009 Fiesta Conference they played without an import but managed to beat the Alaska Aces, and with the Acquisition of Albany Patroons Gabe Freeman as their import they managed to win 8 consecutive games and had the best league record. And they gained an outright semis spot beating Burger King in 6 games as they march to the finals to claim their 18th title by beating the Barangay Ginebra Kings in 7 crucial games.

==== 2009–2011: Santos and Cabagnot's arrival ====
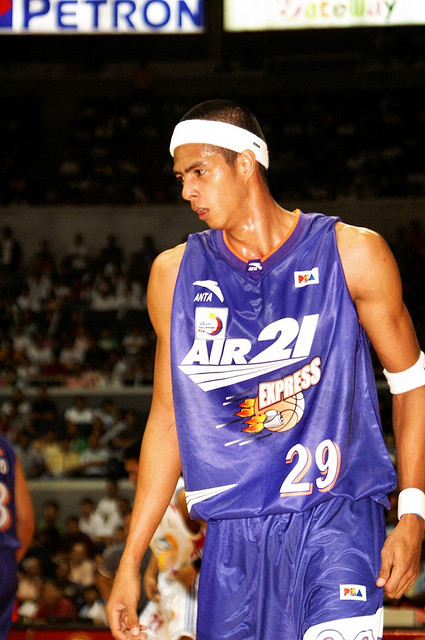
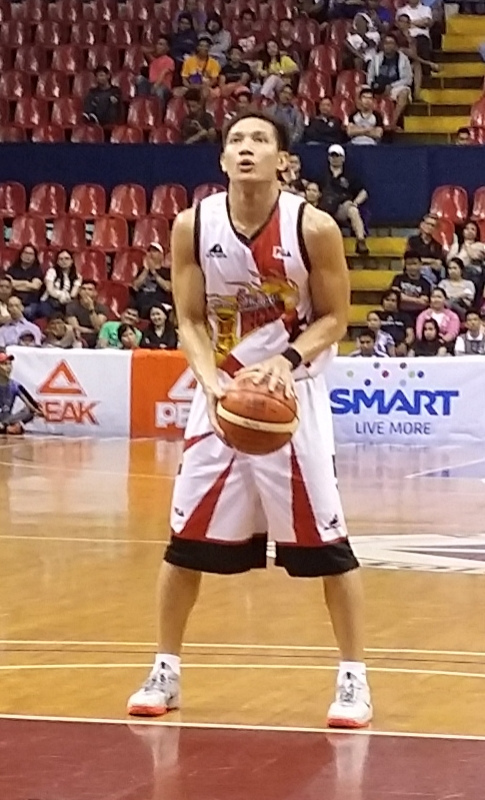
Arwind Santos (left) and Alex Cabagnot (right) were acquired by SMB in 2009 and 2010, respectively, becoming key players for the team throughout the 2010s.

If the San Miguel Beermen was a powerhouse team last season, the team became stronger with their new acquisition of players for the upcoming season. They acquired Arwind Santos from the Burger King in exchange for Marc Pingris, Ken Bono and a future draft pick. They drafted JRU stalwart James Sena in the annual draft. They received FEU standout Dennis Miranda from the Sta. Lucia Realtors in replace for a future draft pick.

The Beermen clinch the 1st outright semis slot but they lost to their sister team the Purefoods Tender Juicy Giants in 6 games (4–2). They top the Kings for the Battle for 3rd place.

In preparation for the coming Fiesta Conference, the Beermen took a shake on their roster. They traded Mike Cortez to Air21 Express in exchange for Alex Cabagnot. Then traded Bonbon Custodio to Sta. Lucia Realtors for Joseph Yeo.

The Beermen lost to Talk 'N Text Tropang Texters in game 6 of the PBA Philippine Cup on February 4, 2011. This is the first finals stint of coach Ato Agustin.

On March 2, 2011, the San Miguel Beermen has finally closed a deal with the Air21 Express with the approval of Commissioner Chito Salud. On this trade, the Beermen shifted Paul Artadi, Danny Seigle, Cebuano Hot Shot Dondon Hontiveros and Dorian Pena to the Express in exchange for three draft rookie draft picks Nonoy Baclao, Rabeh Al-Hussaini and Rey Guevarra. This trade is the revised proposed trade of the Beermen which initially involved Joseph Yeo, Danny Seigle and Mick Pennisi in exchange for the said top rookie picks. This has not been approved by Commissioner Chito Salud until this revised trade came in.

After the trade, they were eliminated and finish 9th place with 2 wins and 7 losses, the worst in franchise history.

==== 2011–2013: The Petronovela and assembling the Death Five ====
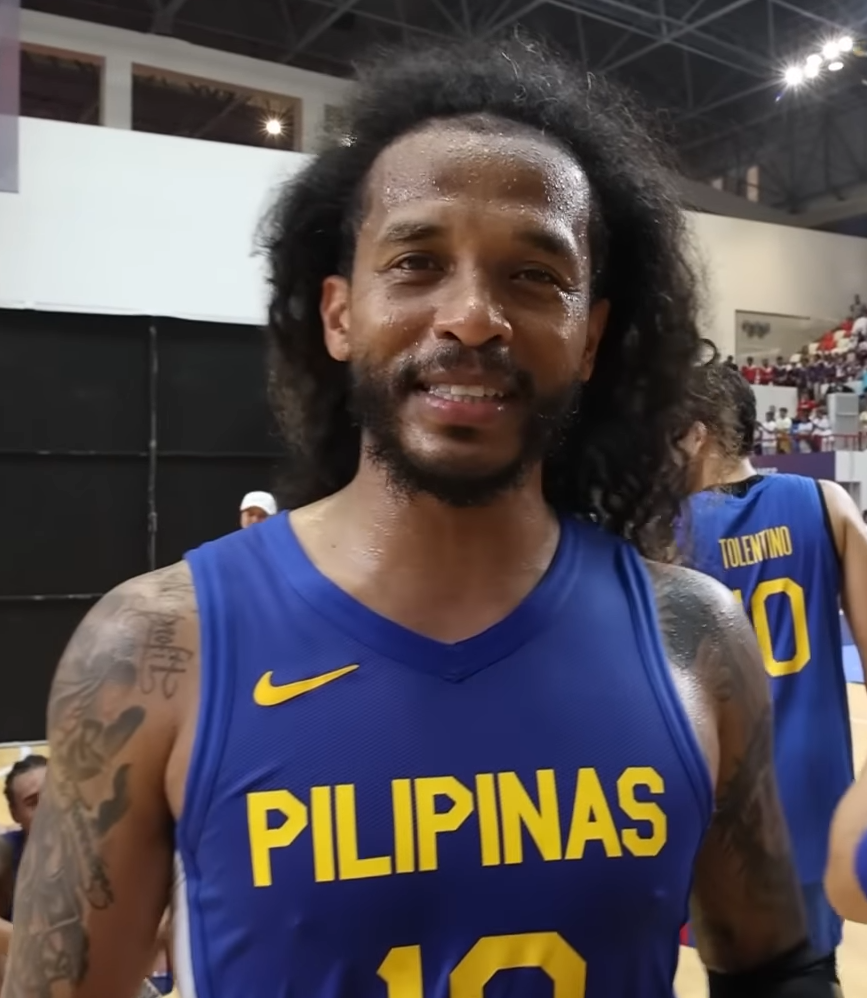
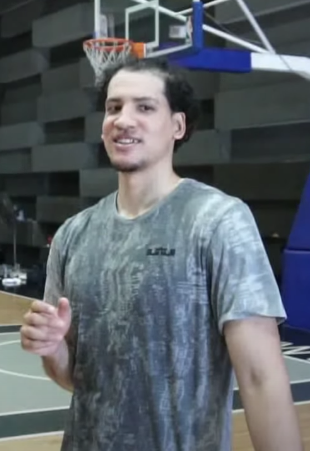
During the Petron era, SMB added Chris Ross (left), Marcio Lassiter (right), and June Mar Fajardo to complete the "Death Five" alongside Santos and Cabagnot.

In March 2011, San Miguel Corporation (SMC) announced that the franchise shall be playing under the name Petron Blaze Boosters, beginning the 2011 PBA Governors' Cup. SMC had acquired majority control of Petron Corporation in December 2010.

After a bad record last conference, they had reached the PBA Finals against the Talk 'N Text Tropang Texters. Even though they had several injured players, they managed to defeat TNT, who were aiming for a rare Grand Slam, in seven games, with Arwind Santos being named as the Finals MVP in his honors.

The Petron Blaze Boosters made some changes in their line-up for the 2011 PBA draft; the Boosters acquired #3 pick Chris Lutz together with Dondon Hontiveros and Carlo Sharma from the Barako Bull Energy. In exchange, Barako Bull Energy received the services of #8 pick Allein Maliksi, Sunday Salvacion, Mick Pennisi and future draft picks.

Having the first overall pick of the 2012 PBA draft, they picked June Mar Fajardo from the University of Cebu. Fajardo has played with the San Miguel Beermen in the ASEAN Basketball League prior to him being drafted.

In 2013, Ronald Tubid was involved in a 5-team, 10-player trade that sent him to Petron Blaze Boosters. The Boosters acquired Barako Bull Tubid while giving away Jojo Duncil and Fil-Am rookie Alex Mallari and Petron's 2014 first round pick. Before the start of the Governors' Cup, Petron traded Jay Washington to Globalport in exchange for Jason Deutchman and 2014 two 2nd round picks, and Dorian Pena plus 2013 2nd round pick to Barako Bull for Doug Kramer.

In September 2013, Petron and Air21 Express completed a deal that sent Joseph Yeo to the Express for Mark Isip.

Petron acquired Chris Ross from GlobalPort Batang Pier in exchange for Denok Miranda. The trade was approved by Comm. Salud on October 30, 2013.

Petron traded Mark Isip together with Magi Sison for 5th overall pick of Barako. Petron traded its 5th pick (originally from Barako) to Globalport for Yousef Taha.

=== 2014–present: The June Mar Fajardo era ===
==== 2014: Fajardo's rise to prominence ====
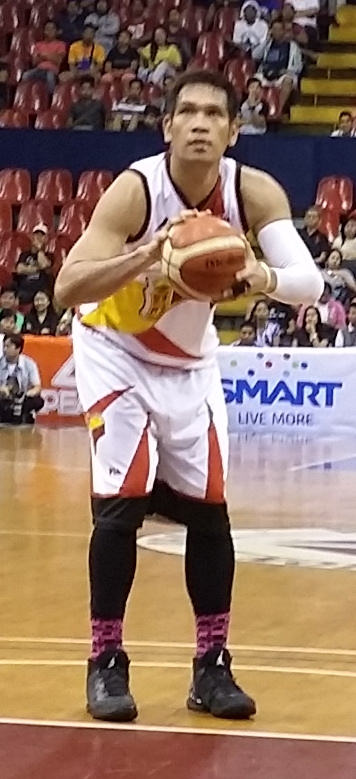
The centerpiece of the "Death Five", June Mar Fajardo led the team to 12 championships as of 2026, evolving into one of the league's greatest players.

On January 13, 2014, SMC President Ramon S. Ang announced that the Petron Blaze Boosters will revert its name back to San Miguel Beermen starting the 2014 PBA Commissioner's Cup, in time for the 25th anniversary of the team's 1989 PBA Grand Slam season. In line with the name change, they also made personnel movements. They elevated longtime assistant coach Biboy Ravanes as head coach and John Todd Purves as active consultant. On February 18, 2014, they traded Alex Cabagnot to GlobalPort for Sol Mercado, and acquired Rico Maierhofer from Barako Bull via a complex seven player trade. Assistant coaches Siot Tanquincen and Leo Austria were let go by the organization as part of the coaching rigodon.

On April 29, 2014, the San Miguel Beermen traded young big man Yousef Taha for GlobalPort Batang Pier's rookie big man, Justin Chua.

After Luigi Trillo resigned with their main rival Alaska Aces, Beermen Governor Robert Non was offered Trillo to be the new head coach to replace Biboy Ravanes. But that time the Beermen offered him, Trillo was already talking with the Meralco Bolts.

==== 2014–2019: Leo Austria's arrival and the Philippine Cup five-peat ====
Winning victory of the San Miguel Beermen during Game 6 of the 2015–16 PBA Philippine Cup Finals at the Smart Araneta Coliseum on January 29, 2016.

The Beermen made some changes with their coaching staff during the off-season. Leo Austria was brought back to the SMC organization and appointed as the new head coach of the team. Biboy Ravanes returned to his old role as assistant coach but Todd Purves was demoted and given minimal role as consultant. They finished as the first seed in the 2014–15 PBA Philippine Cup eliminations with a 9–2 record and earned an outright semis berth. Before the semifinals, Commissioner Salud approved the trade that sent back Sol Mercado to GlobalPort in a straight-swap with Alex Cabagnot. With Cabagnot back in the fold, San Miguel established the infamous "Death Five" along with Chris Ross, Arwind Santos, Marcio Lassiter and June Mar Fajardo which is widely considered as arguably the greatest and most successful starting five in league history. The Beermen swept the Talk 'N Text Tropang Texters in the semifinals. San Miguel then clinched their first Philippine Cup championship in 14 years by beating the Alaska Aces in seven games, for their 20th crown overall. Santos was named Finals MVP.

Coming off a championship run and due to lack of preparation, the Beermen started the 2015 PBA Commissioner's Cup conference winless with four straight losses. Injuries to Cabagnot (hamstring) and Santos (knee contusion) only made matters worse. They decided to let go of import Ronald Roberts and brought in reigning Best Import Arizona Reid after the latter got his release from Rain or Shine. The Beermen missed the playoffs entirely after finishing the conference as the ninth seed with a disappointing 4–7 record.

Still with Reid as their reinforcement, the Beermen bounced back and triumphed once again against Alaska by sweeping them in the Finals of the season-ending Governors' Cup with June Mar Fajardo winning his first Finals MVP.

In the 2015–16 PBA Philippine Cup, the Beermen once again finished the conference with a 9–2 record, this time as a second seed which assured them of a semifinals spot. In the semifinals, the Beermen defeated Rain or Shine and advanced to the Finals despite losing Fajardo in the series-clinching win in Game 6 due to a left knee injury. With Fajardo out, they faced Alaska for the second consecutive season in the Finals and fell into a 0–3 hole against the vengeful Aces. After winning Game 4 in overtime, Fajardo made a return in Game 5 and notched another win in the series. With their star center back even for limited minutes, San Miguel successfully completed their comeback in Game 7 and officially became the first professional basketball team in the world ever to come back from a 0–3 deficit to win a best-of-seven playoff series which was dubbed as the "Beeracle." Chris Ross was named Finals MVP.

The Beermen signed Tyler Wilkerson as their import for the 2016 PBA Commissioner's Cup. He helped the team record an 8–3 win–loss slate in the eliminations and finish as the first seed going into the playoffs. Days later after being down 0–2 to Rain or Shine Elasto Painters in the semis, an off-court drama has unfolded inside the San Miguel locker room after Wilkerson walked out of the team's post-game huddle. He was overheard saying, “Take me back to America. I want to go home.” The management eventually decided to let go of Wilkerson and play an All-Filipino squad in game 3, which they survived to stave off elimination. Wilkerson was substituted by their former import Arizona Reid as a last-minute replacement in the middle of the semifinals. The Beermen lost to the eventual champions Elasto Painters in Game 4.

Finishing as the top seed once again, the Beermen faced a familiar foe in TNT KaTropa in the semifinals and beat them in seven games. San Miguel seized their third straight Philippine Cup title as they defeated Barangay Ginebra in five games to capture the second-ever Perpetual Trophy in league history. The organization was able to permanently keep the 2013 version of the Jun Bernandino Trophy in the process.

The Beermen hired reinfocement Charles Rhodes for their 2017 PBA Commissioner's Cup campaign. With the help of Rhodes who eventually crowned as Best Import of the conference, the Beermen finally won their first Commissioner's Cup title in 17 years after conquering archrival TNT in six games.

In their quest for the franchise's second grand slam after winning the first two conferences, San Miguel was eliminated by Barangay Ginebra in the quarterfinals of the 2017 PBA Governors' Cup with a twice-to-win disadvantage after finishing as the sixth seed.

During the 2017 draft, San Miguel selected Filipino-German big man Christian Standhardinger as their first overall pick. In the 2017–18 Philippine Cup, they defeated the Magnolia Hotshots in five games en route to their fourth straight Philippine Cup title. However in the Commissioner's Cup, they were dethroned by Barangay Ginebra in six games which marks Coach Leo Austria's first loss in the Finals as San Miguel's head coach. The Beermen then failed to reach the Governors' Cup Finals later that year after losing to the Alaska Aces in the quarterfinals.

San Miguel further bolstered its roster by acquiring three-time scoring champion and guard Terrence Romeo in a trade with TNT. The Beermen continued their dominance in the All-Filipino conference as they faced Magnolia once again in a Finals rematch in the 2019 PBA Philippine Cup. The Beermen outlasted the Hotshots and won the series with the slimmest of margins in Game 7, clinching their record-breaking fifth consecutive Philippine Cup title.

After finishing as the seventh seed, the Beermen rewrote history books once again as they became the lowest-seeded team to win a championship after defeating the top-seeded TNT KaTropa in the six-game Commissioner's Cup Finals. During the Governors' Cup, the team parted ways with Standhardinger by trading him to GlobalPort for 2015 first overall pick Moala Tautuaa. The Beermen again fell short of securing the grand slam in the season-ending conference as they lost in the quarterfinals to eventual champions Barangay Ginebra.

==== 2020–2022: The final years of the Death Five ====
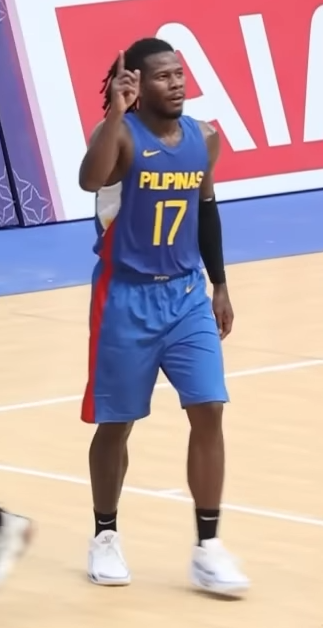
CJ Perez helped in maintaining SMB's power as the "Death Five" era came to a close.

In the next two seasons, San Miguel failed to reach the Finals as injuries plagued the team. Six-time MVP June Mar Fajardo suffered a complete fracture on his right tibia before the start of the 2020 PBA season which caused him to miss the entire season. Terrence Romeo was also sidelined due to a shoulder injury. The short-handed Beermen were ousted by Meralco in the quarterfinals of the Philippine Cup that ended their five-year reign as champions.

At the start of the 2021 PBA season, the Beermen acquired two-time scoring champion and 2019 Rookie of the Year CJ Perez in a blockbuster trade. With a recovering Fajardo back, they failed to recapture the Philippine Cup as they lost to TNT in seven games in the semifinals. In a shocking move, they traded away their longest-tenured player in former MVP Arwind Santos to Northport for forward Vic Manuel. The Beermen continued dismantling their so-called "Death Five" by sending their long-time star guard Alex Cabagnot to Terrafirma for Simon Enciso. During the 2021 PBA Governors' Cup, the team finished as the fifth seed as they were booted out once again by Meralco in the quarterfinals for the second consecutive season.

With a rejuvenated Fajardo back in full health, the Beermen topped the 2022 PBA Philippine Cup eliminations with a 9–2 record. In the semifinals, they exacted revenge against Meralco as they vanquished them in seven games for their first Finals appearance in three seasons. They went on to defeat TNT in a well-fought seven games series in the Finals to reclaim the Philippine Cup title, three years after their historic five-peat in 2019. Solidifying his successful comeback from injury, Fajardo nabbed his record-tying fourth Finals MVP.

== Current roster ==
San Miguel Beermen roster
Players
Coaches

Pos.	#	POB	Name	Height	Weight	DOB (YYYY–MM–DD)	From
G	1	(United States)	Kris Rosales	6 ft 0 in (1.83 m)	165 lb (75 kg)	1990–12–20	Hope International
F	2	(Philippines)	Don Trollano	6 ft 3 in (1.91 m)	182 lb (83 kg)	1992–01–07	Adamson
F/C	3	(United States)	Moala Tautuaa	6 ft 8 in (2.03 m)	245 lb (111 kg)	1989–04–30	Chadron State
G	6	(United States)	Chris Ross	6 ft 1 in (1.85 m)	180 lb (82 kg)	1985–03–09	Marshall
G	7	(United States)	Jerrick Ahanmisi	6 ft 1 in (1.85 m)	185 lb (84 kg)	1997–10–16	Adamson
F	11	(Sweden)	Andreas Cahilig	6 ft 5 in (1.96 m)	190 lb (86 kg)	1991–01–22	EARIST
G/F	13	(United States)	Marcio Lassiter	6 ft 2 in (1.88 m)	185 lb (84 kg)	1987–05–16	Cal State Fullerton
C	15	(Philippines)	June Mar Fajardo	6 ft 10 in (2.08 m)	268 lb (122 kg)	1989–11–17	Cebu
G	18	(Philippines)	Paolo Hernandez	6 ft 0 in (1.83 m)	196 lb (89 kg)	1999–01–09	Mapúa
G/F	21	(Philippines)	Jeron Teng	6 ft 2 in (1.88 m)	185 lb (84 kg)	1994–03–21	De La Salle
C	22	(Philippines)	JM Calma	6 ft 6 in (1.98 m)	193 lb (88 kg)	1997–12–02	San Sebastian
G/F	23	(Australia)	Royce Mantua (R)	6 ft 4 in (1.93 m)		2002–04–12	Adamson
G	39	(Philippines)	Jericho Cruz	6 ft 1 in (1.85 m)	190 lb (86 kg)	1990–10–11	Adamson
G/F	77	(Hong Kong)	CJ Perez	6 ft 2 in (1.88 m)	185 lb (84 kg)	1993–11–17	Lyceum
F	91	(Philippines)	Rodney Brondial	6 ft 5 in (1.96 m)	210 lb (95 kg)	1990–11–20	Adamson

Head coach

- (Philippines) Leo Austria

Assistant coach(es)

- (Philippines) Peter Martin (1st assistant)
- (Philippines) Ato Agustin
- (Philippines) Dayong Mendoza
- (Philippines) Biboy Ravanes
- (United States) Chris Ross
- (Philippines) Boyzie Zamar
- (Philippines) Jorge Gallent (consultant)

Team manager

- (Philippines) Gee Abanilla
- (Philippines) Daniel Henares (assistant)

Legend

- (C) Team captain
- (CI) Commissioner's Cup Import
- (GI) Governors' Cup Import
- (EI) EASL Import
- (DP) Unsigned draft pick
- (FA) Free agent
- (IN) Inactive
- (S) Suspended
- (R) Rookie
- Injured

Roster

== Season-by-season records ==
List of the last five conferences completed by the San Miguel franchise. For the full-season history, see List of San Miguel Beermen seasons.

Note: GP = Games played, W = Wins, L = Losses, W–L% = Winning percentage

Season	Conference	GP	W	L	W–L%	Finish	Playoffs
2024–25	Commissioner's	12	5	7	.417	10th	Did not qualify
2024–25	Philippine	11	8	3	.727	1st	PBA champions, won vs. TNT, 4–2
2025–26	Philippine	11	9	2	.818	1st	PBA champions, won vs. TNT, 4–2
2025–26	Commissioner's	12	7	5	.583	6th	Lost in quarterfinals vs. Rain or Shine**, 104–113
2025–26	Governors' Cup	12	9	3	.750	2nd (Group A)	Lost in quarterfinals vs. Barangay Ginebra, 2–3
An asterisk (*) indicates one-game playoff; two asterisks (**) indicates team with twice-to-beat advantage

== Awards ==
=== Individual awards ===
PBA Most Valuable Player	Finals MVP	PBA Best Player of the Conference
Abet Guidaben – 1987; Ramon Fernandez – 1988; Ato Agustin – 1992; Danny Ildefonso – 2000, 2001; Arwind Santos – 2012–13; June Mar Fajardo – 2013–2019, 2022–2025	Danny Seigle – 1999 Commissioner's, 1999 Governors', 2000 Governors', 2001 All-Filipino; Danny Ildefonso – 1999 Governors', 2000 Commissioner's, 2004–05 Fiesta; Jonas Villanueva – 2008–09 Fiesta; Arwind Santos – 2010–11 Governors', 2014–15 Philippine; June Mar Fajardo – 2014–15 Governors', 2017–18 Philippine, 2019 Philippine, 2022–23 Philippine; Chris Ross – 2015–16 Philippine, 2016–17 Philippine; Alex Cabagnot – 2016–17 Commissioner's; Terrence Romeo – 2019 Commissioner's; CJ Perez – 2023–24 Commissioner's; Jericho Cruz – 2025 Philippine	Allan Caidic – 1995 Governors'; Nelson Asaytono – 1997 All-Filipino, 1998 All-Filipino; Danny Seigle – 1999 Governors', 2005–06 Philippine; Danny Ildefonso – 2000 Commissioner's, 2000 Governors', 2001 All-Filipino, 2001 Commissioner's, 2001 Governors'; Jay Washington – 2009–10 Fiesta Conference, 2010–11 Philippine; Arwind Santos – 2010–11 Governors', 2012–13 Governors'; June Mar Fajardo – 2013–14 Philippine, 2014–15 Philippine, 2014–15 Governors', 2015–16 Philippine, 2016–17 Philippine, 2017–18 Philippine, 2017–18 Commissioner's, 2019 Philippine, 2022–23 Philippine, 2024 Philippine, 2024 Governors', 2025 Philippine, 2025–26 Philippine; Chris Ross – 2016–17 Commissioner's; CJ Perez – 2023–24 Commissioner's
PBA Rookie of the Year Award	PBA All-Defensive Team	PBA Mythical First Team
Marte Saldaña – 1982; Bong Ravena – 1992; Danny Ildefonso – 1998; Danny Seigle – 1999; Rabeh Al-Hussaini – 2010–11	Alvin Teng – 1989–1994; Art dela Cruz – 1992–1993, 1995; Freddie Abuda – 1997–2000; Dorian Peña – 2005–06; Arwind Santos – 2009–2013; Marcio Lassiter – 2012–13; June Mar Fajardo – 2013–15, 2016–19, 2022–2025; Chris Ross – 2014–2021	Manny Paner – 1975; Ernesto Estrada – 1975; Abet Guidaben – 1987; Hector Calma – 1987–1989; Ricardo Brown – 1988; Ramon Fernandez – 1988–1989, 1991–1992; Ato Agustin – 1992–1994; Allan Caidic – 1995; Nelson Asaytono – 1997; Danny Seigle – 1999–2001; Olsen Racela – 2000–2001; Danny Ildefonso – 2000–2001; Nic Belasco – 2004–05; Dorian Peña – 2004–05, 2006–07; Jay Washington – 2008–10; Arwind Santos – 2009–2013, 2014–2017; June Mar Fajardo – 2013–2019, 2021, 2022–2025; Alex Cabagnot – 2016–17; Chris Ross – 2016–17; Marcio Lassiter – 2017–18; CJ Perez – 2022–2025
PBA Mythical Second Team	PBA Most Improved Player	PBA Sportsmanship Award
Elmer Reyes – 1989; Alvin Teng – 1989, 1991–1993; Ramon Fernandez – 1990; Samboy Lim – 1990, 1993; Ato Agustin – 1991; Allan Caidic – 1993–1994; Nelson Asaytono – 1996, 1998; Mike Mustre – 1998; Olsen Racela – 1998–1999, 2004–05; Danny Ildefonso – 1998–1999, 2006–07; Nic Belasco – 2001–2002; Danny Seigle – 2005–06; Dorian Peña – 2005–06; Dondon Hontiveros – 2008–09; Jay Washington – 2010–11; June Mar Fajardo – 2012–13; Alex Cabagnot – 2012–13, 2015–16; Arwind Santos – 2017–18; CJ Perez – 2021	Alvin Teng – 1988; Ato Agustin – 1991; Jonas Villanueva – 2008–09; June Mar Fajardo – 2013–14; Chris Ross – 2016–17; Moala Tautuaa – 2019	Samboy Lim – 1993; Freddie Abuda – 1997–1998, 2000; Dondon Hontiveros – 2004–05; June Mar Fajardo – 2014–16
PBA Best Import		
Norman Black – 1982 Reinforced Filipino, 1985 Open; Bobby Parks – 1987 Reinforced; Kenny Travis – 1993 Governors'; Jeff Ward – 1997 Commissioner's; Larry Robinson – 1997 Governors'; Terquin Mott – 1999 Commissioner's; Lamont Strothers – 1999 Governors'; Gabe Freeman – 2008–09 Fiesta, 2009–10 Fiesta; Charles Rhodes – 2016–17 Commissioner's		

=== PBA Press Corps Individual Awards ===
Executive of the Year	Baby Dalupan Coach of the Year	Defensive Player of the Year
Danding Cojuangco – 2008–09; Ramon S. Ang – 2013–14, 2016–17	Ron Jacobs – 1997; Jong Uichico – 2000; Leo Austria – 2014–17, 2019	Alvin Teng – 1993; Art Dela Cruz- 1995; Freddie Abuda – 1997, 2000; Arwind Santos – 2010–11; June Mar Fajardo – 2014–15; Chris Ross – 2015–17
Bogs Adornado Comeback Player of the Year	Mr. Quality Minutes	All-Rookie Team
Paul Alvarez – 1997; Danny Seigle – 2005–06; Mike Cortez – 2008–09; Danny Ildefonso – 2010–11; Marcio Lassiter – 2012–13; Alex Cabagnot – 2014–15; June Mar Fajardo – 2021	Paul Alvarez – 1997; Boybits Victoria – 2000; Chris Calaguio – 2006–07; Terrence Romeo – 2019; Jericho Cruz – 2022–23	LA Tenorio – 2006–07; Bonbon Custodio – 2008–09; Rabeh Al-Hussaini – 2010–11; Nonoy Baclao – 2010–11; Marcio Lassiter – 2011–12; June Mar Fajardo – 2012–13; Christian Standhardinger – 2017–18

=== All-Star Weekend ===
All Star MVP	Obstacle Challenge	Three-point Shootout	Slam Dunk Contest	All-Star Selection
Samboy Lim – 1990; Alvin Teng – 1992; Allan Caidic – 1993; Danny Ildefonso – 2001; Arwind Santos – 2013, 2019; Alex Cabagnot – 2016	Ato Agustin – 1994; Matt Makalintal – 1995; Jonas Villanueva – 2010; Jeric Fortuna – 2015	Dondon Hontiveros – 2007	Joey Mente – 2001	1989: Hector Calma; Yves Dignadice; Ramon Fernandez; Bobby Jose; Samboy Lim; Elmer Reyes; 1990: Hector Calma; Yves Dignadice; Ramon Fernandez; Samboy Lim; 1991: Ato Agustin; Ramon Fernandez; Alvin Teng; 1992: Ato Agustin; Samboy Lim; Alvin Teng; 1993: Ato Agustin; Allan Caidic; Hector Calma; Yves Dignadice; Ramon Fernandez; Samboy Lim; Alvin Teng; 1994: Ato Agustin; Allan Caidic; Ramon Fernandez; Franz Pumaren; 1995: Ato Agustin; Allan Caidic; 1996: Paul Alvarez; Nelson Asaytono; Samboy Lim; 1997: Nelson Asaytono; Mike Mustre; 1998: Nelson Asaytono; 1999: Danny Ildefonso; 2000: Danny Ildefonso; Olsen Racela; Danny Seigle; 2001: Danny Ildefonso; Danny Seigle; 2003: Nic Belasco; Dondon Hontiveros; Danny Ildefonso; Olsen Racela; 2004: Dondon Hontiveros; Olsen Racela; Dale Singson; 2005: Brandon Cablay; Dondon Hontiveros; Danny Seigle; 2006: Dondon Hontiveros; Danny Ildefonso; Dorian Peña; Olsen Racela; Danny Seigle; 2007: Rommel Adducul; Dondon Hontiveros; Danny Ildefonso; Danny Seigle; 2008: Dondon Hontiveros; Marc Pingris; Lordy Tugade; 2009: Gabe Freeman (import); Dondon Hontiveros; Danny Ildefonso; Dorian Peña; Mick Pennisi; Marc Pingris; Jay Washington; 2010: Dondon Hontiveros; Arwind Santos; 2011: Rabeh Al-Hussaini; Alex Cabagnot; Arwind Santos; Jay Washington; 2012: Alex Cabagnot; Marcio Lassiter; Arwind Santos; 2013: Alex Cabagnot; June Mar Fajardo; Marcio Lassiter; Arwind Santos; Jay Washington; 2014: June Mar Fajardo; Marcio Lassiter; Arwind Santos; 2015: June Mar Fajardo; Arwind Santos; 2016: Alex Cabagnot; June Mar Fajardo; Chris Ross; 2017: Alex Cabagnot; June Mar Fajardo; Marcio Lassiter; Chris Ross; Arwind Santos; Ronald Tubid; Arnold Van Opstal; 2018: Alex Cabagnot; June Mar Fajardo; Marcio Lassiter; Chris Ross; Arwind Santos; 2019: Alex Cabagnot; June Mar Fajardo; Marcio Lassiter; Terrence Romeo; Chris Ross; Arwind Santos; 2023: June Mar Fajardo (did not play); Marcio Lassiter; CJ Perez; 2024: June Mar Fajardo; Marcio Lassiter; CJ Perez; Terrence Romeo; Don Trollano; 2026: Jericho Cruz (did not play); June Mar Fajardo; CJ Perez; Don Trollano

== Notable players ==
=== Members of the PBA's Greatest Players ===
- Ato Agustin – "The Atom Bomb" named 1991 PBA Most Improved Player & 1992 PBA MVP. Played for eight seasons with San Miguel, including the 1989 Grand Slam team. Served as the head coach from 2010–2012 and assistant coach since 2015.
- Ricardo Brown – "The Quick Brown Fox" acquired by the team from Great Taste and played his final playing years with the team, the PBA's All-Time leader in average points with 23.1 ppg in his whole career.
- Allan Caidic – "The Triggerman" acquired in 1993 from the disbanding Presto Ice Cream. He is the 1995 Governor's Cup Best Player of the Conference, 1995 Scoring Champion and 1993 All-Star Game MVP. He played six seasons with the team and later became playing assistant coach.
- Hector Calma – "The Director" was a key point guard of the team during their glory years in the late-1980s. He served once as a Team Manager.
- Ramon Fernandez – "El Presidente"/"The Franchise" acquired from Purefoods in 1988. Won the 1988 PBA MVP with San Miguel. He is also the all-time leader in points, rebounds, blocks and free throws. He played six seasons and was a member of the 1989 Grand Slam team.
- Abet Guidaben – named 1987 PBA MVP as a member of the team
- Danny Ildefonso- known as "The Demolition Man" or "Lakay". 2-time PBA MVP, 5-time Best Player of Conference, 3-time Finals MVP, 2001 All-Star MVP and 1998 Rookie of the Year.
- Avelino "Samboy" Lim – "The Skywalker"/"The Dragon" played his whole career with San Miguel and was known for his fearless drives to the basket that often leads to injuries. 1990 All-Star Game MVP and 1993 Sportsmanship Awardee. He is also a member of the 1989 Grand Slam team. He is one of the most popular figures in franchise history.
- Lim Eng Beng – played for San Miguel from 1982 to 1983.
- Manny Paner – played for the team during the Royal Tru-Orange years and also during the Magnolia years.
- Benjie Paras – "The Tower of Power" made a short comeback in the PBA with the team in 2003.
- Marc Pingris – played for San Miguel from 2008 to 2009.
- Arwind Santos – best known as "The Spiderman" of the PBA and also the 2013 PBA MVP, 2x All-Star MVP and 2x Finals MVP. Played for San Miguel from 2009 to 2021 and member of the "Death Five".

=== Other players ===
Other notable players
- Freddie Abuda- "the Scavenger" is a 4-time Defensive Team member & 2-time Defensive Player of the Year in 1997 & 2000. He is the current assistant coach of the team.
- Rommel Adducul -"The General"
- Kiko Adriano
- Alfie Almario – team captain of the 1989 Grand Slam team.
- Paul Alvarez- "Mr. Excitement"
- Nelson Asaytono- "the Bull" / "the Dynamo"
- Vegildo "Gido" Babilonia- Became the team's starting center in 1995, following Ramon Fernandez' retirement.
- Noli Banate
- Nic Belasco
- Alex Cabagnot (2014–2021) – 2017 Commissioner's Cup Finals MVP, member of the "Death Five"
- Brandon Cablay
- Ricky Cui – A member of the 1989 Grand Slam team, one of the two acquisitions from the disbanded Manila Beer team in 1987.
- Anthony Dasalla – Best remembered for the punching incident with Billy Ray Bates in the San Miguel-Crispa game in 1983.
- Yancy de Ocampo (2015–2019)
- Art dela Cruz, Sr.- 3-time Defensive Team member & 1995 Defensive Player of the Year.
- Yves Dignadice- member of the 1989 Grand Slam team, known defensive stopper, played 13 seasons with the beermen from 1986–1998.
- Rudy Distrito – "the destroyer", played for Gold Eagle/Magnolia in 1984–85.
- Rob Duat
- Gabby Espinas (2015–2018)
- Ernesto "Estoy" Estrada
- Chip Engelland- member of the 1985 San Miguel team that had won the 1985 Jones Cup, known in the PBA as the "Machine Gun", played 3 seasons with the beermen from 1984–1996.
- Rudy Distrito – "the destroyer", played for Gold Eagle/Magnolia in 1984–85.
- Larry Fonacier (2007–2008)
- Bryan Gahol
- Arnold Gamboa
- Dante Gonzalgo – "the Bicol Express" played for Gold Eagle/Magnolia in 1984–85.
- Jeffrey Graves – member of the 1989 Grand Slam team.
- Brian Heruela (2015–2018)
- (United States) (Puerto Rico) John Holland
- Dondon Hontiveros- "The Cebuano Hotshot" – 2004–05 PBA Sportsmanship Award, 2007 PBA 3-Point Shootout Champion
- Alfredo "Pido" Jarencio- "the Fireman"
- Robert "Bobby" Jose- "the Firecracker" was a member of the 1989 Grand Slam team. A PBA All Star during his rookie year.
- Doug Kramer (2013–2015)
- Abe King- "the Chairman of the Board", although played only one season, was considered the team's franchise player in 1984.
- Dwight Lago
- Rudy Lalota
- Federico "Bokyo" Lauchengco
- Renato "Etok" Lobo
- Joey Loyzaga – one of the two Loyzaga brothers, and son of the "Great Difference" Caloy Loyzaga.
- Chris Lutz (2011–2017)
- Yoyong Martirez – By 1982, one of the only 13 loyalist cagers who started on one team since the birth of the PBA in 1975.
- Joey Mente
- Jess Migalbin
- Dennis Miranda (2009–2013)
- Mike Mustre
- Leo Paguntalan
- Dorian Peña (2012–2013)
- Mick Pennisi (2008–2011)
- Dong Polistico – Played his final five seasons with the Beermen as back-up center.
- Franz Pumaren- "the Missile" was member of the 1989 Grand Slam team.
- Olsen Racela – "Rah-Rah" was the 1993 Mr. Quality Minutes, 4th member of 900 games club, 21st member of 2,000 assists club, 6-time mythical five, 3-time most improved player, 5-time all-star, Current head coach of RP U-16 men's basketball team, Current assistant coach of the team.
- Melchor "Biboy" Ravanes – played for San Miguel from 1980–1985 and return to the ballclub in 1992, currently the head coach of the team.
- Ferdinand "Bong" Ravena- 1992 PBA Rookie of the Year, spent two seasons with the beermen, often played reliever to the more established stars of the team.
- Dave Regullano
- Elmer Reyes – "Marco Polo" was member of the 1989 Grand Slam team.
- Marte Saldaña – "The Mighty Mite" was the 1982 PBA Rookie of the Year, a member of the 1982 champion team.
- Joey Santamaria
- Danny Seigle – 1999 PBA Rookie of the year, along with two-time MVP Danny Ildefonso, formed a fearsome combination, that led to the team's late 90s and early 2000 dynasty.
- Dale Singson
- Christian Standhardinger(2018–2019)
- Siot Tanquingcen – Former Head Coach of San Miguel Beermen.
- Alvin Teng- "Robocop" was the 1988 PBA Most Improved Player, a member of the 1989 Grand Slam team, the 1993 PBA All Star MVP & 1993 PBA Defensive Player of the Year and a 4-time Defensive Team member, also the father of Jeric who played for the Rain or Shine Elasto Painters and Jeron who played for the De La Salle Green Archers of the UAAP.
- Lewis Alfred Tenorio (2006–2008)
- Billy Thompson
- Tony Torrente
- Lordy Tugade
- Boybits Victoria
- Elpidio "Yoyoy" Villamin – "The Bicolano Superman"
- Enrico Villanueva – "The Raging Bull"
- Jonas Villanueva (2008–2009)
- Joseph Yeo – PBA Most Improved Player and 2009 PBA Fiesta Conference Finals MVP
- Willy Wilson
- Tonichi Yturri- member of the 1989 Grand Slam team.
Imports
- Mahmoud Abdeen
- Renaldo Balkman
- Eddie Basden
- Mario Bennett
- John Best
- Carl Bird
- Norman Black
- Josh Boone
- Terik Bridgeman
- Brandon Brown
- Ira Brown
- Chris Burgess
- Rick Calloway
- Nate Carter
- Cedric Ceballos
- Derrick Chievous
- Ace Custis
- Pat Durham
- Marcus Faison
- Nick Fazekas
- Gabriel Freeman
- Anthony Grundy
- Frank Gugliotta
- Rico Hill
- Stephen Howard
- Kwan Johnson
- Nate Johnson
- Kevin Jones
- Donnie Ray Koonce
- Art Long
- Amal McCaskill
- Chris McCullough
- Will McDonald
- Wendell McKines
- Elijah Millsap
- Otto Moore
- Richard Morton
- Andrew Moten
- Terquin Mott
- Kevin Murphy
- Shabazz Muhammad
- Bobby Parks
- Michael Phelps
- Larry Pounds
- Lester Prosper
- Larry Robinson
- Arizona Reid
- Charles Rhodes
- Ronald Roberts
- Shea Seals
- Henry Sims
- Michael Singletary
- Keith Smart
- Lamont Strothers
- Kenny Travis
- Jeff Ward
- Jameel Watkins
- Terrence Watson
- Ennis Whatley
- Tyler Wilkerson
- Chris Williams
- Reggie Williams
- Bubba Wilson
- Ricky Wilson
- Jeremy Wise
- Joe Wylie
- Galen Young
- Dez Wells
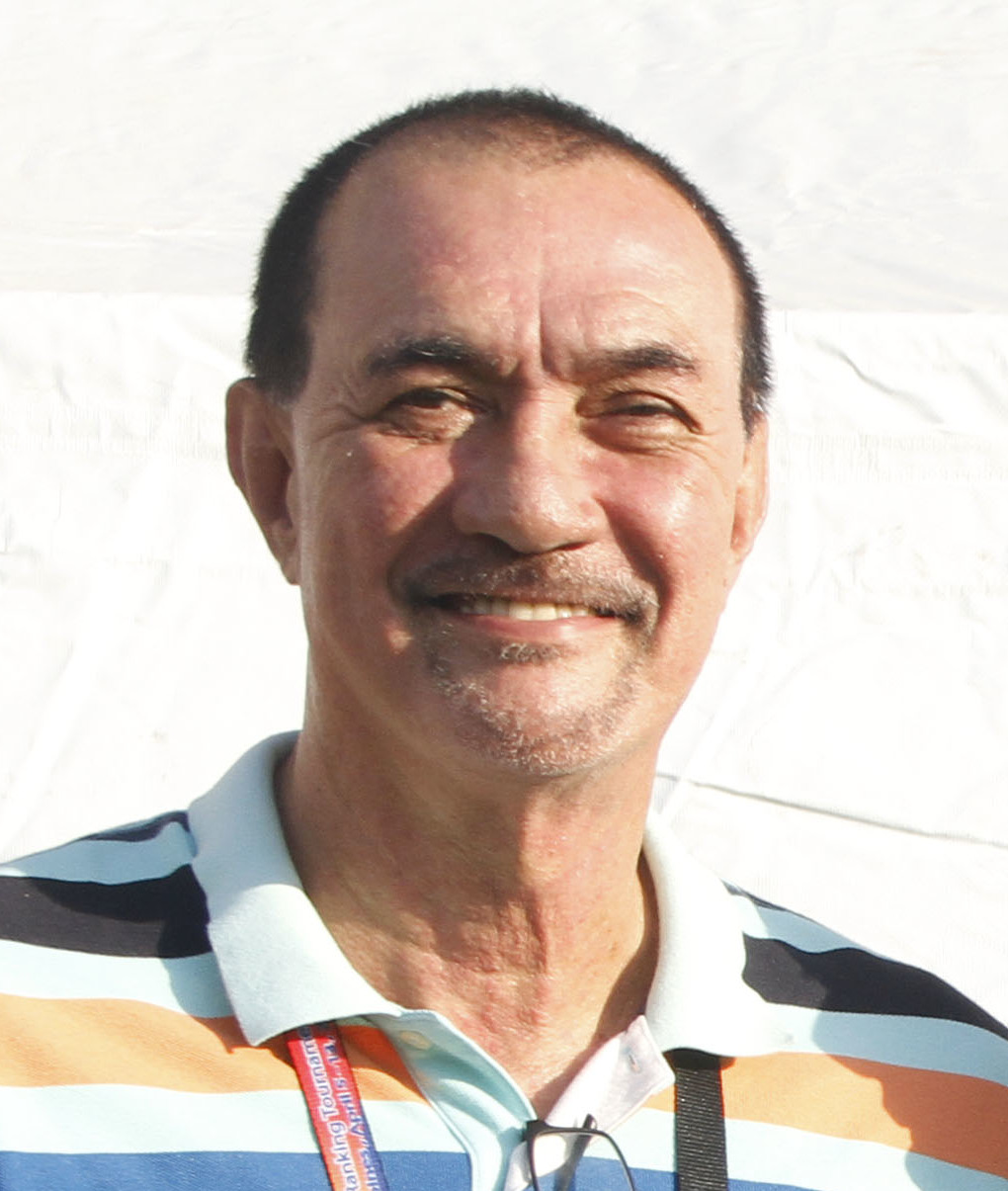
Ramon Fernandez

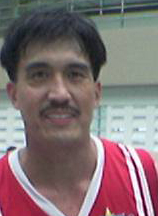
Samboy Lim

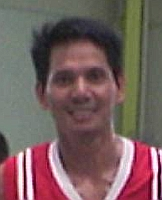
Hector Calma

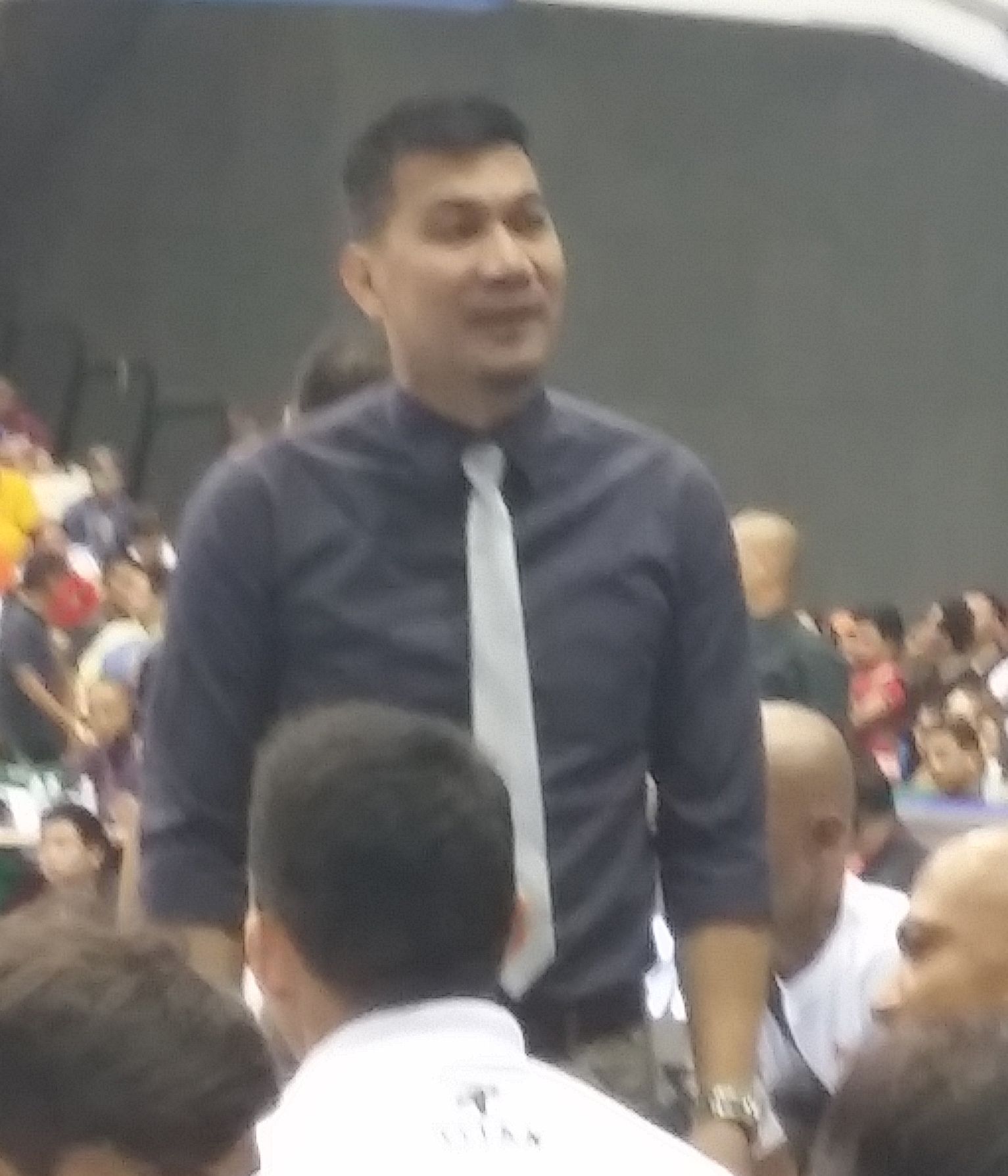
Ato Agustin

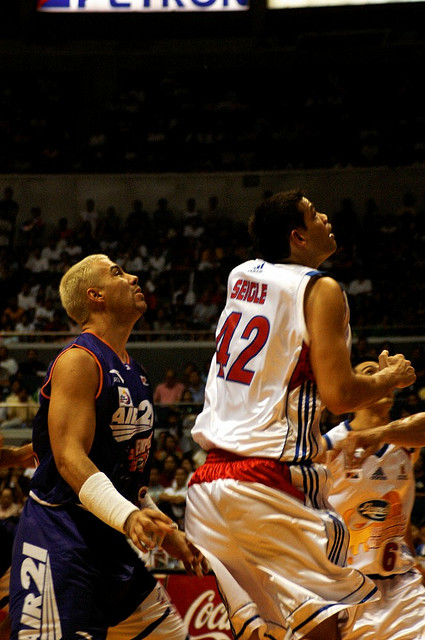
Danny Seigle

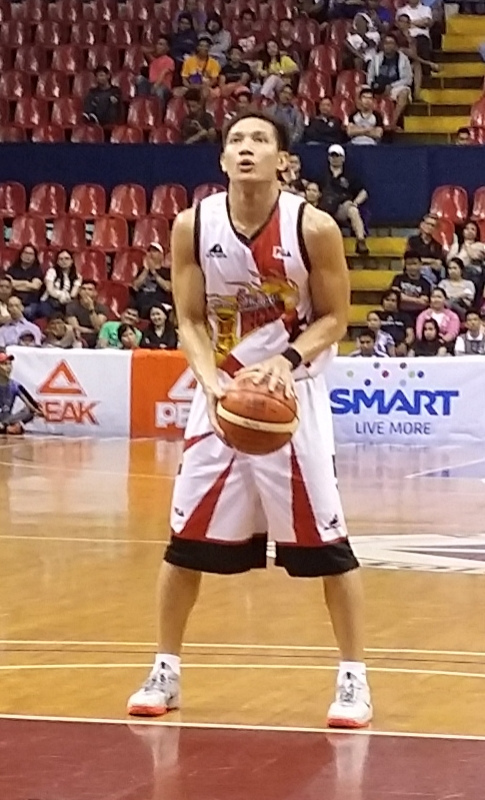
Alex Cabagnot

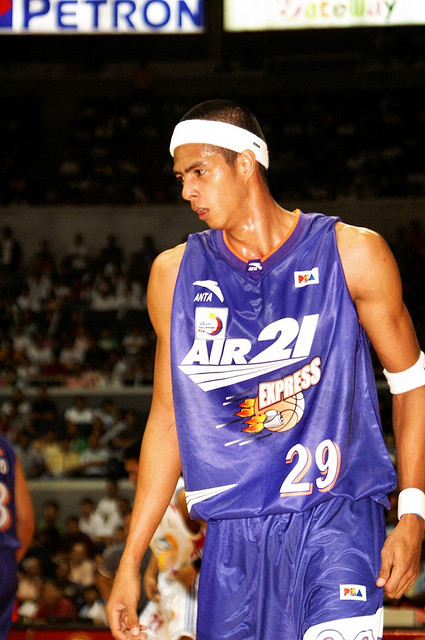
Arwind Santos

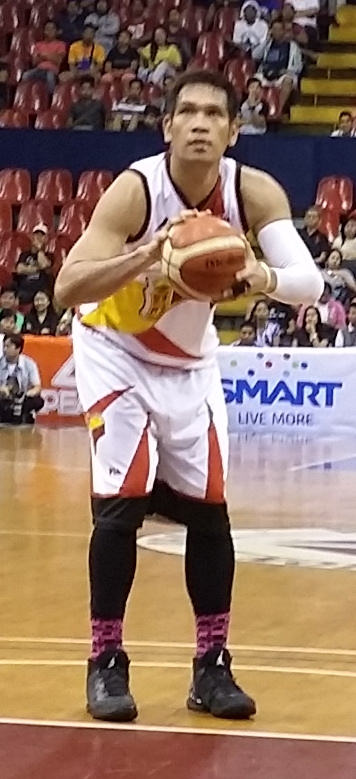
June Mar Fajardo

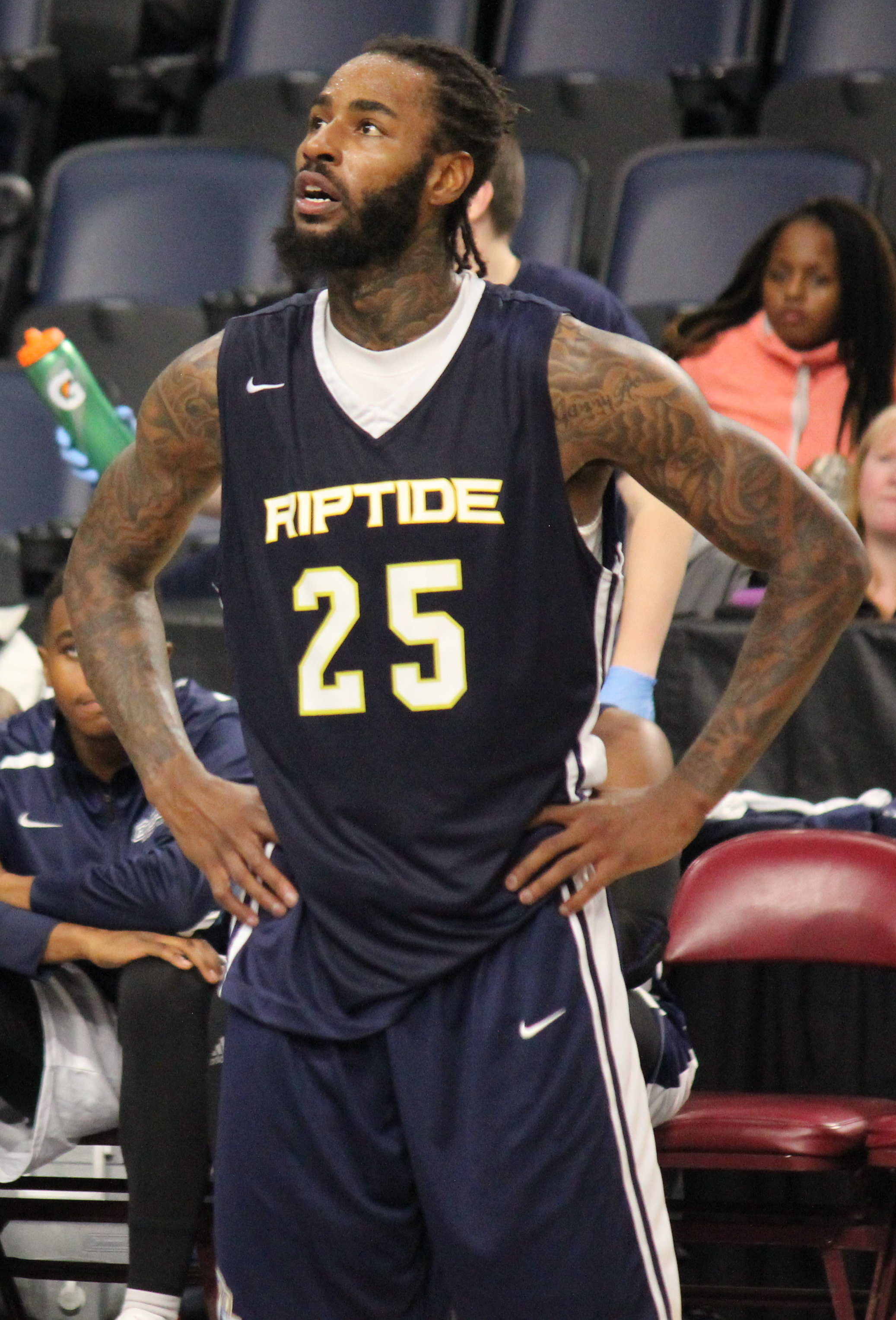
Gabe Freeman

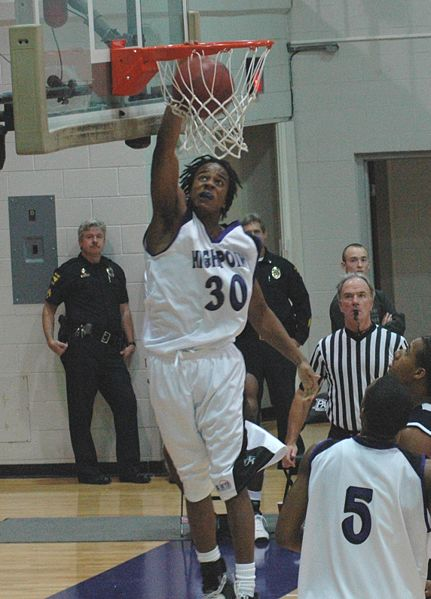
Arizona Reid

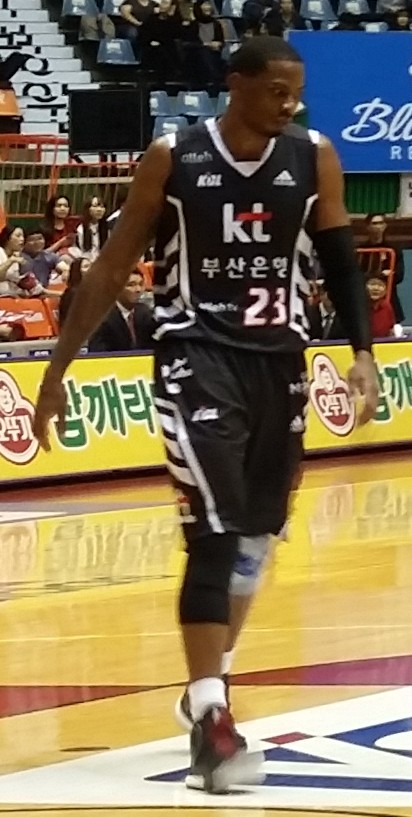
Charles Rhodes

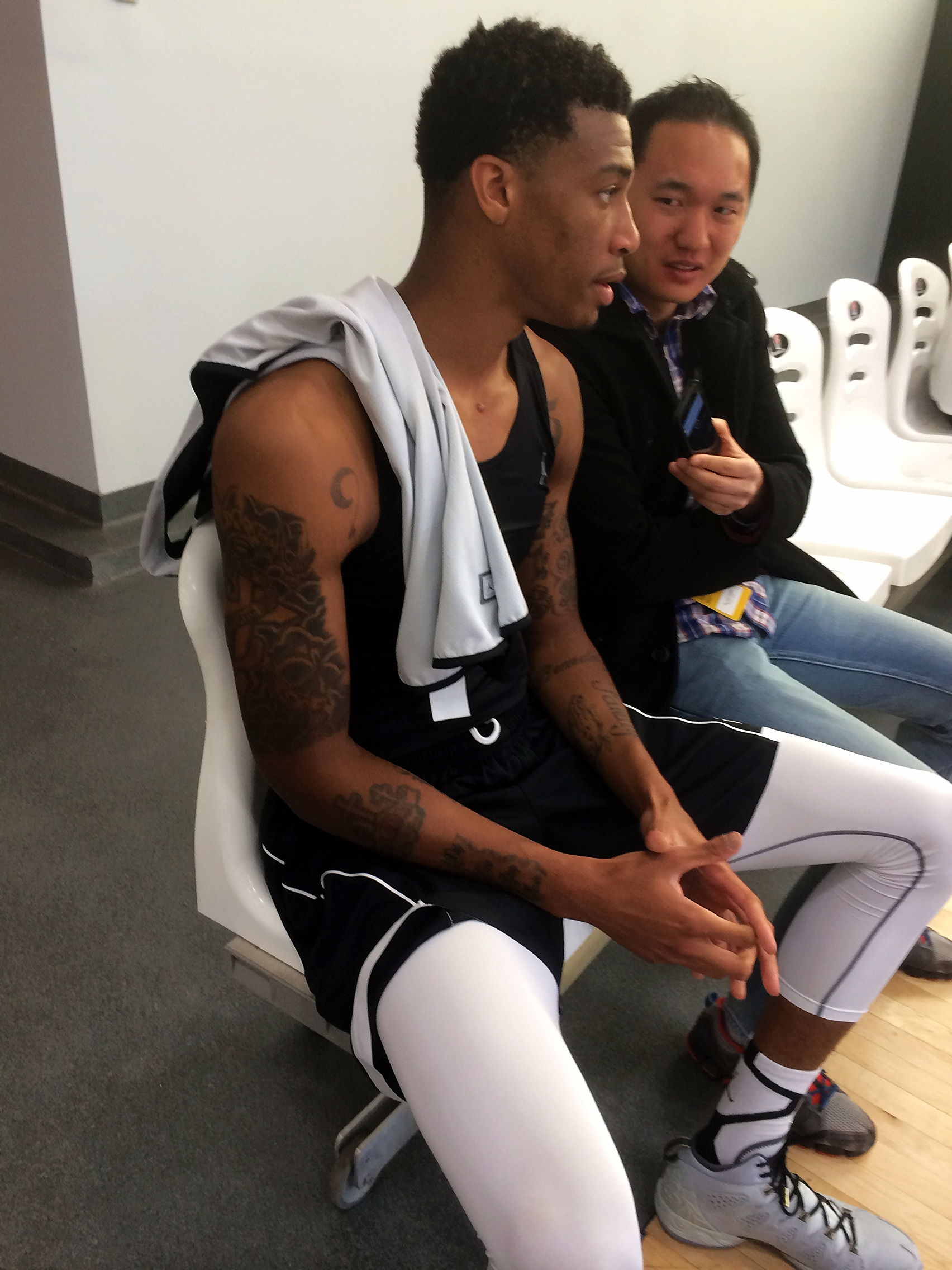
Chris McCullough

== Hall of Famers and retired numbers ==
=== PBA Hall of Famers ===
San Miguel Beermen PBA Hall of Famers
Player/Coach	Position	Seasons w/ San Miguel	Year of Induction
(Philippines) Ramon Fernandez	C-PF	1988–1994	2005
(Philippines) Abet Guidaben	C-PF	1987–1988	2005
(United States) Norman Black	C-PF	1982 (Import), 1985 (Import), 1985–1996 (coach)	2007
(United States) Ron Jacobs	–	1997–1998 (coach)	2007
(Philippines) Danding Cojuangco	–	Team Owner (San Miguel Beermen, Barangay Ginebra San Miguel, Magnolia Hotshots)	2007
(Philippines) Allan Caidic	SG	1993–1998	2009
(Philippines) Samboy Lim	SG/SF	1988–1997	2009
(Philippines) Hector Calma	PG	1986–1994	2009
(Philippines) Tommy Manotoc	–	1981–1982 (coach)	2011
(Philippines) Lim Eng Beng	PG/SG	1983	2013

=== Retired numbers ===
The retired numbers of San Miguel Beermen were previously hanging in the rafters of the Ynares Sports Arena, when it served as the home of ABL's San Miguel Beermen in 2013.

San Miguel Beermen retired numbers
N°	Nat.	Player	Position	Tenure
8	(Philippines)	Allan Caidic	G	1993–1998^{[a]}
9	(Philippines)	Samboy Lim	G	1987–1997^{[d]}
12	(Philippines)	Yves Dignadice	F/C	1987–1997^{[d]}
14	(Philippines)	Hector Calma	G	1986–1994^{[d]}
17	(Philippines)	Olsen Racela	G	1997–2011^{[b]}
19	(Philippines)	Ramon Fernandez	C	1988–1995^{[c]}
29	(Philippines)	Arwind Santos	F	2009–2021^{[e]}

- ^{a} – retired during the 2000 PBA season after announcing Caidic's retirement. Jersey number retired together with Barangay Ginebra San Miguel
- ^{b} – retired during the 2010–11 PBA season
- ^{c} – retired during the 1995 PBA season
- ^{d} – numbers unofficially retired
- ^{e} – retired during the 2023–24 PBA season

== Front office ==
=== Coaches ===
San Miguel Beermen Head Coaches 1975–present
#	Name	Start	End	Regular Season				Playoffs				Best Finish	Achievements
#	Name	Start	End	GC	W	L	Win%	GC	W	L	Win%	Best Finish	Achievements
1	Ignacio Ramos	1975	1977				–				–		
2	Edgardo Ocampo	1978	1980				–				–	Champions	
3	Tommy Manotoc	1981	1982				–				–	Champions	
4	Nat Canson	1983	1984				–				–		
5	Derrick Pumaren	1986					–				–		
6	Norman Black	1985		34	17	17	.500	20	9	11	.450	Finalist	
6	Norman Black	1987	1996				–				–	Champions	
7	Ron Jacobs	1997	1998				–				–	Finalist	
8	Jong Uichico	1999	2006				–				–	Champions	
9	Chot Reyes	2006	2007	36	23	13	.639	25	12	13	.480	Finalist	
10	Siot Tanquincen	2002					–				–	Champions	
10	Siot Tanquincen	2007	2010	118	76	42	.644	64	30	34	.469	Champions	
11	Ato Agustin	2010	2012	63	35	28	.556	39	17	22	.436	Champions	
12	Olsen Racela	2012	2013	37	22	15	.595	15	7	8	.467	Semifinals	
13	Gee Abanilla	2013	2014	32	22	10	.688	10	3	7	.300	Finals	
14	Biboy Ravanes	2007		0	0	0	–	0	0	0	–	Eliminations	
14	Biboy Ravanes	2014		18	13	5	.722	3	0	3	.000	Quarterfinals	
15	Leo Austria	2014	2022	99	72	27	.727	61	38	23	.623	Champions	PBA Coach of the Year (2015, 2016, 2017, 2019)
16	Jorge Gallent	2022	present				–				–		

Team Manager	Assistant Team Manager	Team Consultant
Samboy Lim; Hector Calma (2006–2013); Siot Tanquingcen (2013); Gee Abanilla (2013–present)	Daniel Henares	John Todd Purves (2013–2014)
Team Governor	Alternate Governor	Assistant coaches
Roberto Huang	Ely Capacio✝; Hector Calma (2013); Robert Non (2014–present)	Ato Agustin (2015–present); Jorge Gallent; Peter Martin; Biboy Ravanes; Boyzie Zamar; Dayong Mendoza; Leo Austria; Olsen Racela (2010–2012)

== See also ==
- San Miguel Beermen draft history
- San Miguel Beermen (ABL)
- Petron Blaze Spikers
