= 1980 Great Taste Discoverers season =

- Head coach: Alfonso "Boy" Marquez
- Owner: CFC Corporation

Open Conference results
- Record: 13–14 (48.1%)
- Place: 4th
- Playoff finish: Semifinals

Invitational Championship results
- Record: 0–0
- Place: N/A
- Playoff finish: N/A

All Filipino Conference results
- Record: 1–11 (8.3%)
- Place: N/A
- Playoff finish: N/A

Great Taste Discoverers seasons

The 1980 Great Taste Discoverers season was the 6th season of the franchise in the Philippine Basketball Association (PBA). The team was known as Presto Fun Drinks in the All-Filipino Conference.

== Transactions ==
ADDITIONS
Ernesto Estrada ^{Acquired from Toyota}
Adriano Papa ^{Acquired from defunct Filmanbank}

== Summary ==
In the Open Conference, the Discoverers had returning import Jim Hearns, who saw action for the team last season, being paired with 6-11 Lewis Brown, a Milwaukee Bucks' draftee and the tallest among the crop of imports. Great Taste won eight of their nine games in the first round of elimination phase and losing only to Toyota Tamaraws. Great Taste finish second behind Toyota in the team standings after 18 games with 13 wins and five losses. In the semifinal round, the Discoverers lost all their six assignments and were swept in three games by Crispa Walk Tall Jeans in their series for third place.

The CFC ballclub known as Presto Fun Drinks in the All-Filipino Conference have lost all their nine outings in the one-round eliminations as the franchise set a season record for the longest losing streak by any PBA team at 18 games.

== Win–loss record vs opponents ==
Teams	Win	Loss	1st (Open)	3rd (All-Filipino)
Galleon Shippers	1	3	1-1	0-2
Gilbey’s Gin	1	2	1-1	0-1
Honda	3	1	2-0	1-1
Royal / San Miguel	2	1	2-0	0-1
Tanduay	2	1	2-0	0-1
Tefilin	2	2	2-0	0-2
Toyota Tamaraws	0	5	0-4	0-1
U-Tex Wranglers	2	3	2-2	0-1
Walk Tall / Crispa	1	7	1-6	0-1
Total	14	25	13-14	1-11

== Roster ==
Great Taste Discoverers roster
Players
Coaches

Pos.	No.	Nat.	Name	Ht.	Wt.
F/C	5	(Philippines)	Manny Paner	6 ft 2 in (1.88 m)		Visayas
F	8	(Philippines)	Jacinto Chua	6 ft 0 in (1.83 m)		Far Eastern
G	9	(Philippines)	Leonardo Aranzaso	5 ft 12 in (1.83 m)		Adamson
F	10	(Philippines)	Valerio Delos Santos	6 ft 2 in (1.88 m)		Far Eastern
F/C	11	(Philippines)	Florendo Ritualo	6 ft 3 in (1.91 m)		Baguio
F/C	13	(Philippines)	Danilo Pribhdas	6 ft 3 in (1.91 m)		PCC
G	14	(Philippines)	Danilo Basilan	5 ft 9 in (1.75 m)		Southwestern-U
F	15	(Philippines)	Israel Catacutan	6 ft 2 in (1.88 m)		NCBA
G	16	(Philippines)	Johnny Revilla	5 ft 11 in (1.80 m)		UE
G	20	(Philippines)	Reynaldo Franco	5 ft 9 in (1.75 m)		UE
C	24	(United States)	Lewis Brown (I)	6 ft 11 in (2.11 m)		UNLV
F	33	(United States)	Jim Hearns (I)	6 ft 5 in (1.96 m)		Marymount (KS)
F	44	(Philippines)	Ernesto Estrada	5 ft 11 in (1.80 m)		Visayas
F	55	(Philippines)	Adriano Papa	5 ft 11 in (1.80 m)		National-U
C	56	(Philippines)	Aurelio Clariño	6 ft 2 in (1.88 m)		Adamson

Head coach

- (Philippines) Alfonso Marquez

Assistant coach(es)

- (Philippines) Jimmy Mariano

Legend

- (C) Team captain
- (I) Import
- Injured
