= San Miguel Beermen draft history =

The San Miguel Beermen participated in the first ever PBA draft in 1985, selecting Teddy Alfarero as the first be drafted by them at 3rd overall. They then didn't draft for three years. They returned in 1989 by selecting Bobby Jose and Ato Agustin.

In 2012, they drafted June Mar Fajardo with the #1 overall pick. He would go on to win multiple MVPs and championships with the Beermen. In 2017, they made a controversial trade for the #1 pick with the Columbian Dyip. With the pick, they selected Christian Standhardinger.

== Selections ==
Basketball positions
PG	Point guard
SG	Shooting guard
SF	Small forward
PF	Power forward
C	Center

Draft	Round	Pick	Player	Place of birth	Position	School	Ref
1985	1	3	Teddy Alfarero	Philippines	F/C	La Salle	
1986	Left the league						
1987	Waived rights to draft pool						
1988	No draft picks						
1989	1	6	Bobby Jose	Philippines	F	UST	
1989	2	11	Ato Agustin	Philippines	G	Lyceum	
1990	1	8	Edgardo Postanes	Philippines		Far Eastern	
1990	2	16	Romeo Lopez	Philippines		Arellano	
1990	3	22	Josel Angeles	Philippines		Lyceum	
1991	1	4	Arthur dela Cruz Sr.	Philippines	F	San Sebastian College	
1992	1	5	Bong Ravena	Philippines	G	East	
1992	2	13	Julian Rabbi Tomacruz	Philippines		UST	
1993	2	15	Rodolfo Abad	Philippines		Southwestern	
1993	3	20	Nicasio Serafica	Philippines		Southwestern	
1994	2	15	Mike Otto	Philippines		Far Eastern	
1995	1	5	Bryant Punsalan	Philippines		Far Eastern	
1995	2	13	Matthew Makalintal	Philippines		St. Benilde	
1995	3	20	Silver Villafuerte	Philippines			
1996	1	5	Marcelino Morelos	Philippines		UE	
1996	1	6	Gilbert Castillo	Philippines	F	Letran	
1996	2	13	Roel Bravo	Philippines		Manila	
1997	2	11	Ronilo Padilla	Philippines		UC	
1998	1	2	Noy Castillo	United States	F/C	Citadel	
1998	1	5	William Antonio	United States	G/F	Chaminade	
1998	2	13	Oscar Simon	Philippines		UM	
1999	Direct Hire		Danny Seigle	United States	F	Wagner	
1999	3	21	Rommel Daep	Philippines		San Sebastian	
1999	3	22	Victor Pambuan	Philippines		Ohlone	
2000	Direct Hire		Dorian Peña	United States	F/C	Coppin State	
2000	1	7	Ronaldo Carmona Jr.	Philippines		UPHSD	
2000	3	24	Jojo Castillo	Philippines			
2000	4	31	Noel David	Philippines			
2001	1	10	Joey Mente	Philippines	G	Lyceum	
2001	2	19	Jomar Tierra	Philippines	G	Lyceum	
2001	3	30	Jeremy Anciete	Philippines		North Park	
2001	4	38	Calijohn Orfrecio	Philippines		DLSU	
2001	5	45	Allen Patrimonio	Philippines	F	DLSU	
2001	5	46	Isagani Malindog	Philippines		NU	
2002	2	18	Alvin Castro	Philippines	F	DLSU	
2003	1	8	Marlon Legazpi	Philippines	C	MLQU	
2003	2	18	Arnold Calo	Philippines	F	MLQU	
2004	No draft picks						
2005	1	8	Paolo Hubalde	Philippines	G	UE	
2006	1	4	LA Tenorio	Philippines	G	Ateneo	
2006	1	5	Gabby Espinas	Philippines	F	PCU	
2007	1	2	Samigue Eman	Philippines	C	U of Mindanao	
2007	1	9	Jonas Villanueva	Philippines	G	FEU	
2008	1	8	Bonbon Custodio	Philippines	G	UE	
2009	1	9	James Sena	Philippines	F/C	JRU	
2010	No draft picks						
2011	1	3	Allein Maliksi	Philippines	G/F	UST	
2011	3	23	Filemon Fernandez	United States	PG/SG	Orange Coast	
2011	4	24	Gerald Lapus	Philippines	SF/PF	Arellano	
2012	1	1	June Mar Fajardo	Philippines	C	UC	
2012	1	3	Alex Mallari	United States	G/F	Lewis-Clark	
2012	3	25	Mark Sarangay	Philippines	F/C	Mapua	
2013	3	25	Sam Marata	Philippines	SG	UP	
2013	4	34	Nate Matute	United States	SG	JRU	
2014	2	22	Gab Banal	Philippines	SF	Mapua	
2015	3	32	Michael Mabulac	Philippines	PF	JRU	
2015	4	41	Andretti Stevens	Philippines	PG/SG	Mapua	
2016	Special draft		Arnold Van Opstal	Germany	C	DLSU	
2016	2	6	Rashawn McCarthy	United States	PG/SG	SUNY–Old Westbury	
2016	3	14	Jovit Dela Cruz	Philippines	PG	SSC-R	
2017	1	1	Christian Standhardinger	Germany	F/C	Hawaii	
2017	2	17	Louie Vigil	Philippines	G/F	UST	
2017	3	34	Jerome Ortega	Philippines	G	AMA	
2017	4	41	Joseph Nalos	Philippines	G/F	Adamson	
2018	3	31	Ryan Monteclaro	Philippines	G	Adamson	
2019	3	35	Travis Thompson	United States	G	Alaska Anchorage	
2019	4	42	Daniel de Guzman	Philippines	F	NEUST	
2019	5	45	Von Tambeling	Philippines	G/F	Letran	
2020	3	32	Allen Enriquez	Philippines	F	Arellano	
2020	4	42	Mohammad Salim	Philippines	F	National U	
2020	5	51	Gregory Flor	Philippines	G	PMMA	
2020	6	58	Jeffrey Manday	Philippines	G	Sta. Ana de Victorias	
2020	7	60	Luis Abaca	Philippines	G	St. Benilde	
2021	3	33	Jerwyn Guinto	Australia	F	Lyceum	
2021	4	41	Lyndon Colina	Philippines	G	USPF	
2021	5	49	John Gonzaga	Philippines	G	San Sebastian	
2021	6	52	CJ Cadua	United States	G	EAC	
2022	3	35	Troy Mallillin	Philippines	F	Ateneo	
2022	4	46	Jayson Apolonio	Philippines	F	Letran	
2022	5	57	Ichie Altamirano	Philippines	G	SSC-R	
2022	6	64	John Gob	Philippines	F/C	UP	
2022	7	69	Jayvee dela Cruz	Philippines	G	UC	
2022	8	73	Jamel Ramos	United States	G	Reed HS	
2022	9	76	Kyt Jimenez	Saudi Arabia	G	Perpetual	

=== Notes ===
1.All players entering the draft are Filipinos until proven otherwise.
