= Ernesto Estrada (basketball) =

Filipino basketball player (1949–2015)

Personal information
- Born: November 7, 1949
- Died: May 16, 2015 (aged 65) Los Angeles, California
- Listed height: 5 ft 11 in (1.80 m)

Career information
- College: UV
- Playing career: 1975–1982
- Position: Small forward
- Number: 5

Career history
- 1975–1977: Royal Tru-Orange
- 1978–1979: Toyota
- 1980–1981: Great Taste/Presto
- 1982: Mariwasa-Honda

Ernesto "Estoy" Estrada (November 7, 1949 – May 16, 2015) was a Filipino basketball player. A feared outside shooter, Estrada played for San Miguel Corporation in the amateurs and spent eight seasons in the Philippine Basketball Association from 1975 to 1982 with Royal Tru-Orange, Toyota, where he was part of two championships in 1978, Great Taste and Mariwasa-Honda. Estrada averaged 19.6 points per game in a total of 289 games played and made it once to the PBA Mythical team.
