= 1985 PBA Reinforced Conference finals =

Philippine basketball tournament

Team	Coach	Wins
Northern (NCC)	Ron Jacobs	4
Manila Beer Brewmasters	Edgardo Ocampo	0
- Dates: November 21–28, 1985
- Television: Vintage Sports (MBS)
- Radio network: DZRP/DZFM

PBA Reinforced Conference finals chronology
- 1986 >

The 1985 PBA Reinforced Conference finals was the best-of-7 basketball championship series of the 1985 PBA Reinforced Conference, and the conclusion of the conference playoffs. The Northern Cement basketball team and Manila Beer Brewmasters played for the 32nd championship contested by the league.

Northern (NCC) scored the first ever 4–0 sweep in a best-of-seven championship series against Manila Beer and became the second guest squad to win a PBA title.

== Qualification ==
Manila Beer		Northern
Finished 9–3 (.750), 1st	Eliminations	Finished 7–5 (.583), tied for 2nd
Bye	Tiebreaker	Lost to Ginebra, 96–99
Bye	Quarterfinals	Finished 9–6 (.600), 1st
Finished 4–2 (.667), 1st	Semifinals	Finished 3–3 (.500), tied for 2nd
Bye	Tiebreaker	Defeated Great Taste, 123–107

== Series scoring summary ==
Team	Game 1	Game 2	Game 3	Game 4	Wins
Northern	139	133	130	138	4
Manila Beer	102	117	113	106	0
Venue	ULTRA	ULTRA	ULTRA	ULTRA

== Games summary ==
=== Game 1 ===
Vintage

November 21

Northern (NCC) 139, Manila Beer Brewmasters 102
Scoring by quarter: 27–21, 32–30, 38–20, 42–31
Pts: Jeff Moore 53	Pts: Francois Wise 28

The ULTRA, Pasig

NCC blew the game wide open in the third period on Jeff Moore's perimeter shooting, hitting from all angles as he mocked every defense thrown at him by the Brewmasters. Northern took a commanding 26-point lead going into the final quarter as Moore continued his shooting spree in the fourth period where NCC got their biggest lead of 40 points at 121–81.

=== Game 2 ===
Vintage

November 24

Northern (NCC) 133, Manila Beer Brewmasters 117
Scoring by quarter: 27–30, 29–26, 35–31, 42–30
Pts: Jeff Moore 28 Hector Calma 26	Pts: Francois Wise 37 Gary Vargas 28

The ULTRA, Pasig

From a 56-all deadlock at halftime, the Brewmasters opened the third period with a 13–0 run to take a 69–56 lead. The Nationals bounced back and even grabbed the upper hand at the end of the third quarter at 91–87. In the final period, NCC pulled away and got their biggest lead at 120–97. Four NCC players scored more than 20 points in the game.

=== Game 3 ===
Vintage

November 26

Northern (NCC) 130, Manila Beer Brewmasters 113
Scoring by quarter: 23–25, 28–20, 28–24, 51–44
Pts: Dennis Still 31 Allan Caidic 25	Pts: Francois Wise 43 Atoy Co 26

The ULTRA, Pasig

NCC led by 10 points after three quarters, 79–69. The Nationals began piling up points in the fourth period and pulled away, 106–86, with four minutes to go.

=== Game 4 ===
Vintage

November 28

Northern (NCC) 138, Manila Beer Brewmasters 106
Scoring by quarter: 34–25, 26–26, 39–20, 39–35
Pts: Jeff Moore 41	Pts: Francois Wise 40 Ed Cordero 29
Northern wins series, 4–0

The ULTRA, Pasig

Similar to the series opener, Northern put on a show in a big third quarter explosion with Jeff Moore, Samboy Lim, Hector Calma and Dennis Still all scoring at will and the team shooting at a high field goal. NCC was up by 28 points, 99–71, entering the final quarter. The Brewmasters were totally outclass as coach Ron Jacobs pulled out his starters with about six minutes remaining and the second stringers, particularly Alfie Almario, was still nailing three-pointers to stretch their lead to 38 points at 125–87.

1985 PBA Reinforced Conference Champions

Northern Consolidated (NCC)
First title

== Rosters ==
Northern Cement roster
Players
Coaches

Pos.	No.	Nat.	Name	Ht.	Wt.
F	4	(Philippines)	Alfie Almario	6 ft 3 in (1.91 m)		De La Salle
G	5	(Philippines)	Franz Pumaren	5 ft 9 in (1.75 m)		De La Salle
F	7	(Philippines)	Elmer Reyes	6 ft 1 in (1.85 m)		San Beda
F	8	(Philippines)	Allan Caidic	6 ft 2 in (1.88 m)		UE
F	9	(Philippines)	Samboy Lim	6 ft 0 in (1.83 m)		Letran
C	11	(Philippines)	Tonichi Yturri	6 ft 5 in (1.96 m)		De La Salle
F	12	(Philippines)	Yves Dignadice	6 ft 4 in (1.93 m)		STI WNU
C	13	(United States)	Dennis Still	6 ft 8 in (2.03 m)		Loyola Marymount
G	14	(Philippines)	Hector Calma	5 ft 8 in (1.73 m)		Adamson
F	15	(United States)	Jeffrey Moore	6 ft 3 in (1.91 m)		Loyola (MD)
G	16	(Philippines)	Pido Jarencio	5 ft 10 in (1.78 m)		UST
C	18	(Philippines)	Jerry Codinera	6 ft 5 in (1.96 m)		UE
F	20	(Philippines)	Benjie Gutierrez	6 ft 1 in (1.85 m)		UST

Head coach

- (United States) Ron Jacobs

Assistant coach(es)

- (Philippines) Cris Calilan
- (Philippines) Pilo Pumaren

Legend

- (C) Team captain
- Injured

Manila Beer roster
Players
Coaches

Pos.	No.	Nat.	Name	Ht.	Wt.
G/F	3	(Philippines)	Edgardo Cordero	6 ft 3 in (1.91 m)		UST
F/C	5	(United States)	Francois Wise (I)	6 ft 5 in (1.96 m)		Long Beach State
G	6	(Philippines)	Fortunato Co, Jr	6 ft 0 in (1.83 m)		Mapúa
F	9	(Philippines)	Rodolfo Lalota	6 ft 3 in (1.91 m)		Mapúa
G/F	11	(Philippines)	Gary Vargas	6 ft 2 in (1.88 m)		PSBA
F	13	(Philippines)	Elpidio Villamin	6 ft 2 in (1.88 m)		Far Eastern
F	14	(Philippines)	Leopoldo Herrera	6 ft 3 in (1.91 m)		Wesleyan Philippines
F	16	(Philippines)	Angelito Esguerra	6 ft 2 in (1.88 m)		Letran
G	17	(Philippines)	Eduardo Mendoza	6 ft 0 in (1.83 m)		Visayas
G	22	(Philippines)	Matthew Gaston	6 ft 1 in (1.85 m)		Ateneo
G	24	(Philippines)	Ramon Cruz	5 ft 11 in (1.80 m)		UE
G/F	32	(Philippines)	Timoteo Coloso	6 ft 2 in (1.88 m)		Letran
C	55	(Philippines)	Abet Guidaben	6 ft 5 in (1.96 m)		USJ–R

Head coach

- (Philippines) Edgardo Ocampo

Assistant coach(es)

- (Philippines) Loreto Carbonell

Legend

- (C) Team captain
- (I) Import
- Injured

== Broadcast notes ==
Game	Play-by-play	Analyst
Game 1	Pinggoy Pengson	Norman Black
Game 2	Pinggoy Pengson	Steve Kattan
Game 3	Joe Cantada	Joaquin Henson
Game 4	Joe Cantada	Norman Black
