= Ron Jacobs (basketball) =

American basketball coach (1942–2015)

Personal information
- Born: December 27, 1942 Marion, North Carolina, U.S.
- Died: December 24, 2015 (aged 72) Makati, Philippines

Career information
- College: USC

Career history

Coaching
- 1979–1980: Loyola Marymount
- 1981–1986: Northern Cement
- 1997–1998: San Miguel Beermen
- 2000–2001: Barangay Ginebra Kings (assistant)

Career highlights
- PBA champion (1985 Reinforced); PBA Coach of the Year (1997); PBA Hall of Fame (2007); WCAC Coach of the Year (1980)
Medals
Men's basketball
Head coach for Philippines
ABC Championship
Gold medal – first place	1985 Kuala Lumpur	Team
ABC Under-18 Asian Championship
Gold medal – first place	1982 Manila	Team
SEA Asian Games
Gold medal – first place	1985 Bangkok	Team
William Jones Cup
Gold medal – first place	1981 Taipei	Team
Gold medal – first place	1985 Taipei	Team (Note: The team played under the banner "San Miguel Beer".)

Ronald Jacobs (December 27, 1942 – December 24, 2015) was an American basketball coach. Jacobs was head coach of the men's basketball team of Loyola Marymount University. After turning the program around in just one season, he was invited by Filipino businessman Danding Cojuangco to coach the Philippines men's national basketball team. Jacobs brought the Philippines back to prominence in basketball during the 1980s. He revolutionized the way basketball was played in the Philippines. He raised the level of technology in playing the game and turned every contest into a learning experience by showing how to win with science, hard work, team play and discipline.

== Career ==
=== Loyola Marymount ===
Jacobs was named West Coast Conference Coach of the Year for piloting the Loyola Marymount's basketball varsity to the NCAA Tournament in 1980. He had turned the program around in just a season from a lowly 5-21 pushover to a legitimate contender.

Jacobs became an overnight hero at the Loyola Marymount campus in Los Angeles and there emerged a popular clamor for him to take over as athletic director. This did not sit well with some in the school's Board of Trustees. Jacobs eventually left the university, exasperated by the politics that smeared his name.

=== Philippines ===
As Jacobs reassessed his future, an invitation to visit Manila fell on his lap. Ambassador Eduardo "Danding" Cojuangco, Jr. was appointed project director for basketball by Ferdinand Marcos. Having effectively sidelined then FIBA and BAP President Gonzalo "Lito" Puyat, Cojuangco sent BAP secretary-general Honesto Mayoralgo to the US to look for an American coach who could reinvigorate the sport in the Philippines. Mayoralgo was an Ateneo graduate who tapped his contacts in Jesuit schools to seek recommendations and was pointed at Jacobs' direction.

Jacobs came to the Philippines in 1980 along with another NCAA coach Ben Lindsey. Cojuangco, willing to give any amount just to get any of the two coaches, was to choose who among the two top-notch coaches he would hire to run the state of affairs of Philippine basketball. The jockeying for the position intensified so deeply that the two coaches, once good friends, eventually ended up bitter at each other. Jacobs allegedly threw negative statements behind Lindsey's back and he eventually earned Cojuangco's job for the coveted and lucrative position. Lindsey left the Philippines in a huff, fueling speculations, and Jacobs stayed behind.

==== Philippine men's national team (1981 to 1986) ====
Jacobs's first task was to improve the quality of basketball in the Philippines. After watching some Philippine Basketball Association games, he came up with the idea of naturalizing American collegiate players as Filipinos, to pass basketball technology to Filipino cagers.

Jacobs formed his first team in 1981; it had eight American players (Steve Schall, Steve Lingerfelter, Bruce Webster, Willie Polk, Eddie Joe Chavez, Jeff Moore, Dennis Still and Michael Antoine), two Filipino-Americans (Willie Pearson and Ricky Brown) and two local players (both from San Beda - JB Yango and Frankie Lim). The starting unit for that team included the 7'0 Steve Schall, the 6'8 Dennis Still, the 6'3 Jeff Moore, the 6'1 Eddie Joe Chavez and the 6'0 Ricky Brown. Steve Lingerfelter, at 6'9, was Schall's backup at the slot while Willie Pearson similarly languished at the bench. This team was sent to the 1981 William Jones Cup tournament where they beat a solid American team made up of US NCAA Division I collegiate players by more than 20 points in the finals and an average winning margin of more than 30 points against the others. The 1981 team encountered a backlash as Filipinos found it hard to accept the victory as the Americans were the ones responsible for the victory, with Yango and Lim being fielded sparingly. Jacobs eventually threw his program out of the window when Cojuangco feared the non-acceptance of the Filipinos.

Jacobs' next project was to retain the gold medal in the 1981 SEA Games. Noting the lack of competition, Jacobs decided to field former UE Red Warriors coach Pilo Pumaren instead as coach and gave him enough leeway to run the team. This 1981 team was made up mostly of MICAA and National Seniors players like Ricky Relosa, Bokyo Lauchengco, Itoy Esguerra, Ed Cordero, among others. The gold medal was won with President Marcos himself watching at the Rizal Memorial Coliseum, witnessing the near brawl from the solid kick made by Itoy Esguerra in the face of a Malaysian opponent in the finals.

Jacobs, for the first time, was to handle a national team consisting entirely of Filipino players for the 1982 Asian Youth title. In 1980, the Philippines lost to China - a bitter setback since the Philippines won the first 5 stagings of the tournament. The 1980 team included players like Zaldy Latoza, Elpidio Villamin, Bay Cristobal, Rey Lazaro among others and handled by Turo Valenzona. Jacobs decided to get players mostly from La Salle. This move by Jacobs drew raised eyebrows from the local basketball community as after all, Jacobs was closely associated with then La Salle coach Filomeno "Pilo" Pumaren. Jacobs choices were less talented, less athletic and unknown players in the collegiate ranks like La Salle players Jun Tan, Jong Uichico, Teddy Alfarero, Derrick Pumaren, Rey Cuenco of Arellano University and Alfie Almario. The only deserving players in Jacobs' list, as far as Philippine basketball leaders then were concerned, were Hector Calma of Adamson University, Louie Brill and Elmer Reyes of San Beda College. It was contended that the team Jacobs formed was weak since dominant collegiate players like Joey Loyzaga, Terry Saldaña and Sonny Cabatu were left out. Another criticism was that all players selected were above 19 years of age - the Asian Youth were only for players who were 19 years old and below. Hector Calma was reportedly a ripe 23 years old already by then. No team from 1970 to 1984 fielded in a legitimate lineup, and only when the media reported this in 1987 did the Philippines under Joe Lipa field a legitimate Youth team made up of Benjie Paras, Nelson Asaytono, Bong Alvarez, Eric Reyes, Jun Reyes, Bobby Jose among others.

Even with the criticisms, the RP Youth team mangled the opposition heading towards the semifinals where met South Korea. This was the game Jacobs feared the most, especially since South Korea was bannering the very young but promising rookie Hur Jae. The Philippines won the game, 77-74, which featured a mini-brawl with the usual taunts and threats. The team was to meet China, who won over Japan, in the finals. In the finals, the Philippine side featured Alfie Almario's timely sniping from the outside, Hector Calma's masterful quarterbacking, and Teddy Alfarero's matching up well against China's star forward Wang Libin. The Philippines won the game 74-63 with Imelda Marcos and an overflow crowd of 25,000 in the Araneta Coliseum witnessing the game. Appreciation and the heart of the Filipino fans fell most on Calma and Almario. During the awarding ceremony, Imelda Marcos went to Calma and Almario and gave both players a hug with kisses on both sides of cheeks that drew an emotional applause from the crowd.

In 1983, Jacobs decided to retain the services of Jeff Moore and Dennis Still, owing to the lack of big men that the country faced. Having read through the FIBA rules where naturalized players can only play after 3 years of residency, he immediately submitted Moore and Still's application for naturalization. He then sought for a shooter in the US to provide the outside sock and eventually train the likes of budding shooters like Allan Caidic of UE, Pido Jarencio of UST, Jojo Lastimosa of Ateneo, and Ato Agustin of Lyceum. He recruited Arthur "Chip" Engelland of Duke University, who would be eligible to play by 1987 for the national team.

In 1984, the Philippines, under Jacobs, played in the ABC tournament held in Qatar. They won their first three games in the eliminations only to be forfeited because of the ineligibility of Engelland, Moore and Still. Howls of protest from the team did not prosper despite the initial assurance made by the ABC, eventually raising the suspicion that the Philippine team was set up to lose via technicality. The team went down 0-3 and the American members were barred from playing. The team didn't qualify for the quarterfinals and ended up in the classification round, where they beat the remaining rivals convincingly despite playing only their 9 Filipino players. Hence, they became the only team in the history of the ABC to have won all its games in the tournament but ended up 9th overall.

In the latter part of 1984, the Philippines won the Asian Interclub title to earn the right to play in the 1985 Intercontinental Cup to be held in Girona, Spain. The Philippines, playing as the Northern Consolidated Cement basketball team featuring Moore, Engelland and Still, went up against the Golden Eagles from the USA representing North America, CA Monte Líbano, representing Brazil (bannered by the De Souza brothers, wily point guard Milton Setrini, and the eminent Oscar Schmidt) representing South America, Banco di Roma Virtus (featuring Dino Meneghin) of Italy and Košarkaški klub Cibona featuring Drazen Petrovic for Europe. The Philippine NCC team lost to Cibona of Zagreb 111-86 in the first game and on the Second day lost to the Golden Eagles of the USA 81-73. In the third game, they lost by a solitary point against the Brazilians, 78-77. But in the Fourth game, the Philippine NCC team toppled the Italians by more than 19 points, 98-79. Reports from Girona said that the team won the hearts of the Spanish basketball fans as they saw the smallest basketball team in the World Cup for Champion Clubs play competitively against taller opponents from Europe and America. Ron Jacobs later admitted that he did not instill in his players' minds to give their best for the World Cup for Champion Clubs, as they treated the tournament as just part of their preparation for the coming Asian Basketball Confederation Championships.

In 1985, an even bigger victory came in the William Jones Cup in Taiwan. Ranked 4th overall, the Philippine team wasn't expected to do well, especially since the Americans were represented by solid NCAA Division I players like Harold Pressley, Joe Wolf, Kenny Gattison, Kevin Henderson, Jay Bilas and Tommy Amaker and coached by Purdue's Gene Keady, fresh from being awarded 1984 NCAA national coach of the year and Big 10 Coach of the year. Keady was assisted on the bench by Bruce Weber, his assistant at Purdue that would later become a decorated coach himself. But Jacobs' boys pulled off one surprise after another as Moore worked like a horse, Engelland was at his pinpoint accuracy best, Calma was at his prime handling the court generalship role, and the tandem of Samboy Lim and Allan Caidic doing wonders both inside and outside. In the finals, the team found itself to be in a dilemma, as center Dennis Still was hobbled by a bum knee while Jeff Moore encountered some back problems. But showing true guts and courage, the two players overcame the odds, and, with Engelland sniping away from the outside with 42 points and Lim, Caidic and Franz Pumaren doing equal damage from the arc, the SMB team won against the Americans overtime of the final, 108-100. Tommy Amaker didn't know what hit him - he was astonished how Calma outran and outfoxed him all throughout the game. It came to a point when the foreign press described Calma as the "point guard whiz" from the Philippines while being astonished by Samboy Lim's high-flying and daredevil ways. Jacobs in an interview said "I thought the American team that beat us in the Interclub World Tourney was weaker than the American team we beat in the Jones Cup finals". In saying those words, Jacobs meant that they could have won two successive trophies if only they treated the World Interclub tourney seriously.

With the momentum on their side, Jacobs' team their last pre-ABC tournament in the Philippine Basketball Association's Reinforced Conference, with each team featuring one import with a maximum height of 6'5. In one semifinals tiff held at the ULTRA, Jacobs' went up against Robert Jaworski's Ginebra San Miguel in what may be considered as one of the best PBA games of all time. Ginebra lost Robert Jaworski via a busted lip midway in the second quarter on account of a wayward elbow from Moore that forced him to rush to the emergency room of the nearby Medical City in Pasig. Given up for lost, the Philippine team ran roughshod against the Gins minus their leader. When Jaworski came back to the coliseum with less than 8 minutes left in the 4th canto, the crowd erupted seeing the Big J with a bandage on his upper lip. The Big J entered the game, his team behind 15 points. The crowd was already in a frenzy by then, and every Ginebra shot was punctuated by heavy cheering matched only by every NCC missed shot. The game ended with Ginebra winning and Jacobs shaking his head in disbelief.

However, this did not stop Jacobs' wards in their drive for the championship. Having topped the semifinals round, they earned the first seat in the finals and waited for the winner of the Manila Beer-Ginebra series. They dethroned Great Taste Coffee in the semifinals. Jacobs secretly longed to have Manila Beer in the finals, knowing fully well how difficult to go up against a Ginebra team with the crowd behind them. Similarly, Jacobs had difficulty finding an antidote to Michael Hackett, unlike Manila Beer's Francois Wise who Still can dominate one-on-one. Manila Beer beat Ginebra in sudden death to barge into the finals. It was a rout - Jacobs led a 4-0 sweep, including a 32-point victory in the last game, 138-106 - regarded as the most lopsided finals ever in PBA history.

In December 1985, the ABC Championship was held in Kuala Lumpur, Malaysia with the Philippines as favorites to win the championship alongside China. In the semifinals, the Philippine team demolished China to earn the right to meet South Korea in the finals. The team finally regained its ABC Championship, last won in 1973 when the tournament was in Manila, on January 5, 1986, with Samboy Lim and Allan Caidic leading in the scoring end.

As early as 1985, Jacobs was already mapping out a grand plan to ensure continuity with his system. Knowing fully well that Still and Moore were already in their 30s, he eyed Benjie Paras and Alvin Patrimonio to take over the slots left by Still and Moore. Engelland, on the other hand, was relatively younger and was already honing Allan Caidic, Naning Valenciano and Pido Jarencio's shooting skills. Jacobs was also expecting Jojo Lastimosa to take over the slot to be vacated by Engelland in the future.

Then the People Power Revolution took place in February 1986 that forced the departure of Cojuangco. Jacobs suddenly found himself without a job as the BAP under Puyat regained control of Philippine basketball fiefdom. Jacobs left for the US but later returned sometime in 1994.

==== PBA (1994–2002) ====
In the 1994 Asian Games held in Hiroshima, the Philippine national team was composed mainly of players from the 1994 PBA All-Filipino champions San Miguel Beer. Coach Norman Black backstopped a team featuring Allan Caidic, Ato Agustin, Dong Polistico, Alvin Teng, Hector Calma plus three players from Purefoods (Alvin Patrimonio, Jerry Codinera, Rey Evangelista), 1 player from Alaska (Johnny Abarrientos) and 2 topnotch amateurs (Marlou Aquino and Kenneth Duremdes). Jacobs was sent by Cojuangco to provide advice to Black. Jacobs was seen in one game in the semifinals, where Jacobs and Quinito Henson almost came to blows with Norman Black as the latter despised the two's incessant interference in his coaching. Eventually, this team ended up 4th place and out of the medal race in the tournament.

Black was then eased out of the San Miguel Beer bench to give way to Jacobs, who was given the reins in 1997. Jacobs handled a moribund San Miguel team that had only Nelson Asaytono as his offensive weapon. In that only season as head coach, Jacobs piloted SMB to two third-place finishes - an outstanding feat especially considering the lineup that the Beermen possessed.

In 1998, the Basketball Coaches Association of the Philippines (BCAP) under Chito Narvasa petitioned to the Department of Labor and Employment (DOLE) that Ron Jacobs had no right to coach a PBA team, being a foreigner. The DOLE agreed and Jacobs was made a consultant and gave the coaching job to his protege Jong Uichico. A few weeks after, Jacobs was being contemplated upon by then PBA Commissioner Jun Bernardino to handle the 1998 Centennial team that was tasked to win the gold at the 1998 Asian Games in Thailand. Again, the BCAP stepped in and protested Jacobs' pending appointment. Bernardino instead appointed Alaska coach Tim Cone to handle the reins of the national team, who copped a bronze medal.

In 2000, Jacobs later served as an assistant coach and consultant of Ginebra. Buf that time, he also sometimes plays consultant to San Miguel.

==== Philippine men's national team (2002) ====
In 2002, Bernardino formally appointed Jacobs to handle the national team to play in the 2002 Asian Games. Armed with a blueprint designed to earn the gold medal, Jacobs proposed having two national team selections made up of 24 of the most outstanding PBA players to go up against PBA teams with import reinforcements. While many questioned Jacobs' preference to play in the PBA (which was to revert to amateur rules during the time), no one doubted what Jacobs had in mind for he was the only one who understood what he was doing. But Jacobs suffered a near-fatal stroke, and the coaching mantle was eventually turned over to Uichico who was earlier appointed as Jacobs' chief second and scout. The fourth place standing in the Asian Games ended up as being one of the biggest disappointments in Philippine sports in year 2002.

== Protégés ==
Today, several of Jacobs disciples are coaching or occupying front office jobs in Philippine basketball:

- Binky Favis - former assistant coach of Barangay Ginebra Kings and former head coach of Coca Cola Tigers.
- Siot Tanquincen - former University of Santo Tomas guard and Jacobs scout who won two titles as Ginebra San Miguel coach and one title with his former team, the San Miguel Beermen. Formerly served as an assistant coach for De La Salle Green Archers of the UAAP.
- Eric Altamirano - former head coach of the National University Bulldogs in the UAAP which he led to a championship in Season 77 in 2014. He is the former lead assistant coach of the Alaska Aces in the PBA.
- Allan Caidic - "The Triggerman", one of PBA's all-time three-point leaders, former assistant coach and former head coach of the Barangay Ginebra Kings. Also briefly served for De La Salle Green Archers as an assistant coach.
- Tonichi Yturri - former assistant coach of Adamson Soaring Falcons; former head coach of the Cebu Gems (MBA), the Benilde Blazers (NCAA) and Harbour Centre (PBL.
- Hector Calma - former team manager and star player of the San Miguel Beermen.
- Samboy Lim - "The Skywalker" former player of the San Miguel Beermen and team manager of the Barangay Ginebra Kings.
- Pido Jarencio - "The Fireman" champion coach of the UST Tigers in the 2006 UAAP and current head coach of NorthPort Batang Pier.
- Franz Pumaren - Former head coach of the De La Salle Green Archers, Adamson Soaring Falcons (UAAP) and Magnolia (PBL). Led the Green Archers to 4 straight UAAP titles.
- Jun Tan - head coach in the Cebu ranks and the former of the Granny Goose Tortillos (PBL).
- Jong Uichico - former head coach of the Talk N' Text Tropang Texters. He also led the San Miguel Beermen to six titles from 1999-2006 and Barangay Ginebra San Miguel to two titles from 2006-2008. Currently, the lead assistant of Philippines.
- Louie Brill - team captain of RP Youth and tournament MVP 1982. Commissioner and founder of the Fil-Am Basketball League (FABL) of Maryland. Trains Filipino American youths to compete in yearly Inter-State Basketball Tournament. Played for Ron Jacobs with NCC. Won two championships with the San Beda Red Lions 1977-78.

== Coaching record ==
=== PBA record ===
Season	Team	Conference	Elims./Clas. round					Playoffs				
Season	Team	Conference	GP	W	L	PCT	Finish	PG	W	L	PCT	Results
1984	Northern Cement	First All-Filipino	14	11	3	.786	1st	11	5	6	.454	Third Placer
1984	Northern Cement	Second All-Filipino	11	8	3	.727	2nd	11	6	5	.545	Lost on the Third Place Playoff
1985	Northern Cement	Open	12	7	5	.583	3rd	12	7	5	.583	Third Placer
1985	Northern Cement	Reinforced	12	7	5	.583	4th	13	9	4	.692	Won PBA Championship
1997	San Miguel	All-Filipino Cup	14	7	7	.500	4th	9	4	5	.444	Lost in the Third Place Playoff
1997	San Miguel	Commissioner's Cup	10	6	4	.600	2nd	10	6	4	.600	Lost in the Third Place Playoff
1997	San Miguel	Governor's Cup	13	9	5	.643	1st	6	3	3	.500	Third Placer
1998	San Miguel	All-Filipino Cup	11	7	4	.636	1st	17	12	5	.706	Lost in the finals
1998	San Miguel	Commissioner's Cup	11	6	5	.545	3rd	10	6	4	.600	Lost in the finals
1998	San Miguel	Governor's Cup	15	9	6	.600	3rd	10	4	6	.400	Lost in the third-place playoff
Career total			124	77	47	.621	Playoff total	109	62	47	.569	1 championship

== Later life and death ==
On December 22, 2001, Jacobs suffered a stroke while driving home to his apartment in Pasig. Jacobs became bedridden, unable to speak and walk. For the remainder of his life, he continued to live in the Philippines with his wife, Menen.

Jacobs died on the evening of December 24, 2015, in Makati, three days short of his 73rd birthday from complications of the stroke he suffered 14 years prior.

Preceded by First	NCC Basketball Program Head Coach; 1980-1986	Succeeded by Disbanded
