= 1987 PBA Reinforced Conference finals =

Basketball competition in the Philippines

Team	Coach	Wins
San Miguel Beermen	Norman Black	4
Hills Bros. Coffee Kings	Arturo Valenzona	1
- Dates: December 3–13, 1987
- Television: Vintage Sports (PTV)
- Radio network: DZSR

Referees
- Game 1: G. Ledezma, B. dela Cruz, A. Bartolome
- Game 2: G. Ledesma, A. dela Cruz, R. Gamad
- Game 3: G. Ledesma, M. Felipe, R. Gamad
- Game 5: G. Ledesma, A. dela Cruz, R. Gamad

PBA Reinforced Conference finals chronology
- < 1986 1988 >

The 1987 PBA Reinforced Conference finals was the best-of-7 series basketball championship of the 1987 PBA Reinforced Conference, and the conclusion of the conference playoffs. The San Miguel Beermen and Hills Bros. Coffee Kings played for the 38th championship contested by the league.

San Miguel Beermen wins their third PBA title and its first championship in five years, defeating Hills Bros. Coffee Kings in their finals series, 4 games to 1.

== Qualification ==
San Miguel		Hills Bros.
Finished 6–4 (.600), tied for 2nd	Eliminations	Finished 6–4 (.600), tied for 2nd
Finished 13–5 (.722), 1st	Semifinals	Finished 10–8 (.556), tied for 2nd
Finished 13–5 (.722), 1st	Tiebreaker	Won against Ginebra, 89–87

== Series scoring summary ==
Team	Game 1	Game 2	Game 3	Game 4	Game 5	Wins
San Miguel	97	123	114	113	96	4
Hills Bros.	110	100	92	105	86	1
Venue	ULTRA	ULTRA	ULTRA	ULTRA	ULTRA

== Games summary ==
=== Game 1 ===
Vintage

December 3
7:20 pm

San Miguel Beermen 97, Hills Bros. Coffee Kings 110
Scoring by quarter: 29–23, 19–25, 23–29, 26–33
Pts: Bobby Parks 27	Pts: Slaughter 39 Villamin 34
Hills Bros. leads series, 1–0

The ULTRA, Pasig, Metro Manila
Referees: G. Ledezma, B. dela Cruz, A. Bartolome

The Coffee Kings squeeze out the best from import Jose Slaughter and Yoyoy Villamin, who scored 34 points, the highest for a local in this conference, to roll back San Miguel Beermen. Slaughter refused to succumb to the pressure when the Beermen threatened at 95–98 in the closing two minutes. Four straight points from Slaughter and charities by Frankie Lim and Tim Coloso sealed the win, 105–95, with 28 seconds to go.

=== Game 2 ===
Vintage

December 6
6:20 pm

San Miguel Beermen 123, Hills Bros. Coffee Kings 100
Scoring by quarter: 26–25, 33–17, 27–26, 37–32
Pts: Bobby Parks 38	Pts: Jose Slaughter 36
Series tied, 1–1

The ULTRA, Pasig, Metro Manila
Referees: G. Ledesma, A. dela Cruz, R. Gamad

Down 26–27, the Beermen immediately blazed away from all angles to open up a 50–36 lead before taking the first 24 minutes of play at 59–42. Bobby Parks and Abet Guidaben combined to stretch the lead to 22 points in the third quarter at 77–55.

=== Game 3 ===
Vintage

December 8
7:20 pm

San Miguel Beermen 114, Hills Bros. Coffee Kings 92
Scoring by quarter: 31–28, 27–11, 29–19, 27–34
Pts: Bobby Parks 43	Pts: Jose Slaughter 27
San Miguel leads series, 2–1

The ULTRA, Pasig, Metro Manila
Referees: G. Ledesma, M. Felipe, R. Gamad

The Beermen limited the Coffee Kings to only 11 points in the second quarter en route to a 58–39 halftime lead. Hills Bros badly missed the services of Marte Saldana on a twisted left knee ligament, Ricky Relosa on a left hand bone fracture and Bogs Adornado. Coffee Kings coach Arturo Valenzona had to field in seldom used Teddy Alfarero, Dennis Abbatuan and Adonis Tierra. There was no stopping the Beermen as they led by as many as 31 points, 87–56.

=== Game 4 ===
Vintage

December 10
7:20 pm

San Miguel Beermen 113, Hills Bros. Coffee Kings 105
San Miguel leads series, 3–1

The ULTRA, Pasig, Metro Manila

Ricky Relosa suited up for Game four but the Coffee Kings efforts were not enough in stopping the Beermen from taking a 3–1 series lead. Hills Bros was in the thick of the fight until the final minute of the ballgame.

=== Game 5 ===
Vintage

December 13
6:20 pm

San Miguel Beermen 96, Hills Bros. Coffee Kings 86
Scoring by quarter: 32–21, 22–23, 19–24, 23–18
Pts: Bobby Parks 30	Pts: Jose Slaughter 32
San Miguel wins series, 4–1

The ULTRA, Pasig, Metro Manila
Referees: G. Ledesma, A. dela Cruz, R. Gamad

Hector Calma, Bobby Parks and Abet Guidaben combined to open up a 30–18 lead before the Beermen took the half at 50–44. The Coffee Kings, undaunted by injuries to their key men, refused to give up easily and levelled the count five times, the last at 75-all, but the Beermen unloaded a crippling 17–2 blast to break the backs of the Coffee Kings and led, 92–77, with 2:23 to go. Bobby Parks put on the final icing of their title triumph with a buzzer-beating jumper.

1987 PBA Reinforced Conference Champions

San Miguel Beermen
Third title

== Rosters ==
San Miguel Beermen roster
Players
Coaches

Pos.	No.	Nat.	Name	Ht.	Wt.
F	4	(Philippines)	Elmer Reyes	6 ft 1 in (1.85 m)		San Beda
G	5	(Philippines)	Franz Pumaren	5 ft 9 in (1.75 m)		De La Salle
G	6	(Philippines)	Pido Jarencio	5 ft 10 in (1.78 m)		UST
G	7	(Philippines)	Alfie Almario	6 ft 0 in (1.83 m)		De La Salle
F	9	(Philippines)	Samboy Lim	6 ft 0 in (1.83 m)		Letran
F	10	(Philippines)	Alvin Teng	6 ft 4 in (1.93 m)		Arellano
C	11	(Philippines)	Tonichi Yturri	6 ft 5 in (1.96 m)		De La Salle
F	12	(Philippines)	Yves Dignadice	6 ft 4 in (1.93 m)		STI WNU
G	14	(Philippines)	Hector Calma	5 ft 9 in (1.75 m)		Adamson
F	15	(Philippines)	Ricardo Cui	6 ft 3 in (1.91 m)		Lyceum
F	17	(Philippines)	Jeffrey Graves	6 ft 3 in (1.91 m)		Angeles
G/F	22	(United States)	Bobby Parks (I)	6 ft 3 in (1.91 m)		Memphis
C	32	(Philippines)	Abet Guidaben	6 ft 5 in (1.96 m)		USJ–R

Head coach

- (United States) Norman Black

Assistant coach(es)

- (Philippines) Derrick Pumaren

Legend

- (C) Team captain
- (I) Import
- Injured

Hills Bros. Coffee Kings roster
Players
Coaches

Pos.	No.	Nat.	Name	Ht.	Wt.
F	2	(Philippines)	Alejo Alolor	6 ft 1 in (1.85 m)		Visayas
G	4	(Philippines)	Frankie Lim	5 ft 11 in (1.80 m)		San Beda
G	7	(Philippines)	Marte Saldaña	5 ft 11 in (1.80 m)		Far Eastern
F	9	(Philippines)	Naning Valenciano	6 ft 1 in (1.85 m)		USLS
C	12	(Philippines)	Teddy Alfarero	6 ft 4 in (1.93 m)		De La Salle
F	13	(Philippines)	Elpidio Villamin	6 ft 3 in (1.91 m)
F	15	(Philippines)	Ricky Relosa	6 ft 3 in (1.91 m)		Mapúa
G/F	21	(United States)	Jose Slaughter (I)	6 ft 3 in (1.91 m)		Portland
F	22	(Philippines)	Dennis Abbatuan	6 ft 2 in (1.88 m)		José Rizal
G	26	(Philippines)	Adonis Tierra	5 ft 9 in (1.75 m)		FEATI
G	32	(Philippines)	Tim Coloso	6 ft 2 in (1.88 m)		Letran
F	33	(Philippines)	Bogs Adornado	6 ft 1 in (1.85 m)		UST

Head coach

- (Philippines) Arturo Valenzona

Assistant coach(es)

- (Philippines) Cholo Martin

Legend

- (C) Team captain
- (I) Import
- Injured

== Broadcast notes ==
Game	Play-by-play	Analyst
Game 1	Pinggoy Pengson	Andy Jao
Game 2	Joe Cantada	Quinito Henson
Game 3	Sev Sarmenta	Joaqui Trillo
Game 4		
Game 5		
