= 1988 PBA Reinforced Conference finals =

Philippine basketball tournament

Team	Coach	Wins
San Miguel Beermen	Norman Black	4
Shell Rimula X Oilers	Dante Silverio	1
- Dates: December 4–13, 1988
- Television: Vintage Sports (PTV)
- Radio network: DZSR

Referees
- Game 1: G. Ledesma, D. Bayais, E. de Leon
- Game 2: G. Ledesma, A. Bartolome, R. Hines
- Game 5: G. Ledesma, A. Bartolome, E. de Leon

PBA Reinforced Conference finals chronology
- < 1987 1989 >

The 1988 PBA Reinforced Conference finals was the best-of-7 series basketball championship of the 1988 PBA Reinforced Conference, and the conclusion of the conference's playoffs. The San Miguel Beermen and Shell Rimula X Diesel Oilers played for the 41st championship contested by the league.

The San Miguel Beermen easily retains the Reinforced Conference title with a 4–1 series victory over Shell Rimula X Diesel Oilers and claim their 5th PBA crown.

== Qualification ==
San Miguel		Shell
Finished 7–3 (.700), tied for 1st	Eliminations	Finished 5–5 (.500), tied for 2nd
Finished 13–5 (.722), 1st	Semifinals	Finished 11–7 (.611), 2nd

== Series scoring summary ==
Team	Game 1	Game 2	Game 3	Game 4	Game 5	Wins
San Miguel	134	119	126	144	151	4
Shell	111	111	137	119	142	1
Venue	ULTRA	ULTRA	ULTRA	ULTRA	ULTRA

== Games summary ==
=== Game 1 ===
Vintage

December 4
6:20 pm

San Miguel Beermen 134, Shell Rimula X 111
Scoring by quarter: 30–27, 25–33, 30–27, 49–24
Pts: Norman Black 39 Michael Phelps 39	Pts: Derrick Rowland 42
San Miguel leads series, 1–0

The ULTRA, Pasig, Metro Manila
Referees: G. Ledesma, D. Bayais, E. de Leon

Shell battled defending champion San Miguel for most of the first three quarters before falling apart in the fourth, enabling the Beermen to win by a rout, the key factor in the opening game was the explosive performance of Franz Pumaren, who came off the bench because of the foul trouble of Hector Calma going into the final quarter.

=== Game 2 ===
Vintage

December 6
7:20 pm

San Miguel Beermen 119, Shell Rimula X 111
Scoring by quarter: 31–26, 32–31, 25–27, 31–27
Pts: Michael Phelps 39	Pts: Derrick Rowland 36
San Miguel leads series, 2–0

The ULTRA, Pasig, Metro Manila
Referees: G. Ledesma, A. Bartolome, R. Hines

An 11–1 burst by the Beermen in the final two minutes gave them a 2–0 edge in the series, a rash of errors by Shell in the last 1:25 caused their downfall, after battling San Miguel to 11 deadlocks, lose steam in the homestretch and failed to keep their composure by taking a couple of bad shots.

=== Game 3 ===
Vintage

December 8
7:20 pm

San Miguel Beermen 126, Shell Rimula X 137
Scoring by quarter: 20–30, 33–37, 46–32, 27–38
Pts: Norman Black 39 Samboy Lim 28	Pts: Derrick Rowland 38 Bobby Parks 37
San Miguel leads series, 2–1

The ULTRA, Pasig, Metro Manila

Shell raced to an early 17-point lead and with the score at 73–61 in favor of the Diesel Oilers, Jay Ramirez suffered a nasty fall when he pulled down Samboy Lim who landed on top of Ramirez as the rookie banged the back of his head against the hardcourt and had to be carried out on a stretcher. Just when Shell looked sure of a victory, Samboy Lim cut loose to rally the Beermen back and tied the count at 99-all at the end of the third quarter. San Miguel import Michael Phelps fouled out trying to stop Derrick Rowland with Shell on top, 115–111.

=== Game 4 ===
Vintage

December 11
6:20 pm

San Miguel Beermen 144, Shell Rimula X 119
Scoring by quarter: 36–26, 32–34, 32–25, 44–34
Pts: Norman Black 41	Pts: Bobby Parks 36
San Miguel leads series, 3–1

The ULTRA, Pasig, Metro Manila

San Miguel established a big lead early, the third quarter saw Shell mount an uprising that brought them within a couple of baskets of the Beermen until Samboy Lim, who had been fantastic throughout the series, engineered a counter-rally that gave them a dominating 100–85 lead going into the last 12 minutes. Rookie Jay Ramirez was slapped off a deliberate foul on Samboy Lim with some 43 seconds remaining in the game when Samboy apparently got hit on the teeth by Jay's elbow, causing him to bleed in the mouth.

=== Game 5 ===
Vintage

December 13
6:30 pm

San Miguel Beermen 151, Shell Rimula X 142
Scoring by quarter: 30–33, 34–37, 41–29, 46–43
Pts: Norman Black 42	Pts: Bobby Parks 56 Derrick Rowland 42
San Miguel wins series, 4–1

The ULTRA, Pasig, Metro Manila
Referees: G. Ledesma, A. Bartolome, E. de Leon

Shell took the first two quarters until Samboy Lim once more led his team to a double-digit margin from a 64–70 halftime deficit to a 105–99 San Miguel advantage at the end of the third period. Shell coach Dante Silverio, visibly upset over the poor officiating, was irked when confetti rained down on Shell's frontcourt with 1:11 left to play, the Beermen on top, 145–134. There were only 36 seconds before the final buzzer and the score, 147–138 for San Miguel, when Silverio summoned his players to walk out and immediately leave the playing arena and go back to their locker room, PBA Vice Chairman Jose Ibazeta, who was seated on the San Miguel bench, went to Silverio and tried to convince him to return to the court and apologized for what happened; after some prodding, Silverio acceded to their request of coming back to finish the game, the clock was set back to 1:11 and the count at 145–134 for San Miguel, the Oilers went back with coach Dante Silverio leading the way.

1988 PBA Reinforced Conference Champions

San Miguel Beermen
Fifth title

== Awards ==
- Sports Columnist Organization of the Philippines (SCOOP) Finals Most Outstanding local player: Samboy Lim ( Average 22.2 pts, 4.4 rebs, 2.8 assists in the finals series)
- Sports Columnist Organization of the Philippines (SCOOP) Finals Most Outstanding import: Norman Black

== Rosters ==
San Miguel Beermen roster
Players
Coaches

Pos.	No.	Nat.	Name	Ht.	Wt.
F	4	(Philippines)	Elmer Reyes	6 ft 1 in (1.85 m)		San Beda
G	5	(Philippines)	Franz Pumaren	5 ft 9 in (1.75 m)		De La Salle
G	7	(Philippines)	Alfie Almario	6 ft 0 in (1.83 m)		De La Salle
F	9	(Philippines)	Samboy Lim	6 ft 0 in (1.83 m)		Letran
F	10	(Philippines)	Alvin Teng	6 ft 4 in (1.93 m)		Arellano
C	11	(Philippines)	Tonichi Yturri	6 ft 5 in (1.96 m)		De La Salle
F	12	(Philippines)	Yves Dignadice	6 ft 4 in (1.93 m)		STI WNU
G	14	(Philippines)	Hector Calma	5 ft 9 in (1.75 m)		Adamson
F	15	(Philippines)	Ricardo Cui	6 ft 3 in (1.91 m)		Lyceum
F	17	(Philippines)	Jeffrey Graves	6 ft 3 in (1.91 m)		Angeles
C	19	(Philippines)	Ramon Fernandez	6 ft 4 in (1.93 m)		San Carlos
F/C	24	(United States)	Norman Black (I)	6 ft 5 in (1.96 m)		Saint Joseph's
G/F	25	(United States)	Michael Phelps (I)	6 ft 3 in (1.91 m)		Alcorn State

Head coach

- (United States) Norman Black

Assistant coach(es)

- (Philippines) Derrick Pumaren

Legend

- (C) Team captain
- (I) Import
- Injured

Shell Rimula X roster
Players
Coaches

Pos.	No.	Nat.	Name	Ht.	Wt.
C	1	(Philippines)	Manny Victorino	6 ft 5 in (1.96 m)		José Rizal
F	2	(Philippines)	Jay Ramirez	6 ft 2 in (1.88 m)		Visayas
F	3	(Philippines)	Edgardo Cordero	6 ft 3 in (1.91 m)		UST
G	5	(Philippines)	Ronnie Magsanoc	5 ft 9 in (1.75 m)		UP Diliman
G	7	(Philippines)	Ramon Dela Cruz	5 ft 11 in (1.80 m)		Philippine Christian
F/C	9	(Philippines)	Rey Cuenco	6 ft 4 in (1.93 m)		De La Salle Araneta
G	10	(Philippines)	Romeo Ang	6 ft 1 in (1.85 m)		Letran
G	11	(Philippines)	Jaime Manansala	5 ft 11 in (1.80 m)		UE
F	12	(Philippines)	Victor Sanchez	6 ft 2 in (1.88 m)		Mapúa
G	13	(Philippines)	Leo Austria	5 ft 10 in (1.78 m)		Lyceum
F	14	(Philippines)	Leopoldo Herrera	6 ft 2 in (1.88 m)		Wesleyan Philippines
F	16	(Philippines)	Angelito Esguerra	6 ft 1 in (1.85 m)		Letran
G/F	19	(Philippines)	Freddie Hubalde	6 ft 1 in (1.85 m)		Mapúa
F	22	(United States)	Bobby Parks (I)	6 ft 3 in (1.91 m)		Memphis
F/C	44	(United States)	Derrick Rowland (I)	6 ft 5 in (1.96 m)		SUNY Potsdam

Head coach

- (Philippines) Dante Silverio

Assistant coach(es)

- (Philippines) Arlene Rodriguez

Legend

- (C) Team captain
- (I) Import
- Injured

== Broadcast notes ==
Game	Play-by-play	Analyst
Game 1		
Game 2		
Game 3		
Game 4	Joe Cantada	Quinito Henson
Game 5	Sev Sarmenta	Andy Jao
