= 1989 PBA Open Conference finals =

Team	Coach	Wins
San Miguel Beermen	Norman Black	4
Formula Shell Zoom Masters	Dante Silverio	1
- Dates: May 11–21, 1989
- Television: Vintage Sports (PTV)
- Radio network: DZSR

PBA Open Conference finals chronology
- < 1988

The 1989 PBA Open Conference finals was the best-of-7 series basketball championship of the 1989 PBA Open Conference, and the conclusion of the conference's playoffs. The San Miguel Beermen and Formula Shell Zoom Masters played for the 42nd championship contested by the league. The finals series serves as a rematch between these two teams that battled in the Third Conference finals last season.

The San Miguel Beermen repeated against the Formula Shell Zoom Masters in a similar 4–1 conquest and retains the PBA Open Conference crown.

== Qualification ==
San Miguel		Shell
Finished 10–0 (1.000), 1st	Eliminations	Finished 5–5 (.500), tied for 2nd
Finished 14–4 (.778), 1st	Semifinals	Finished 10–8 (.556), 2nd

== Series scoring summary ==
Team	Game 1	Game 2	Game 3	Game 4	Game 5	Wins
San Miguel	146	114	130	104	123	4
Formula Shell	132	107	124	115	105	1
Venue	ULTRA	ULTRA	ULTRA	ULTRA	ULTRA

== Games summary ==
=== Game 1 ===
Vintage

May 11
7:30 pm

boxscores

San Miguel Beermen 146, Formula Shell Zoom Masters 132
Scoring by quarter: 33–20, 34–30, 50–32, 29–50
Pts: Ramon Fernandez 36	Pts: Bobby Parks 39 Benjie Paras 34
San Miguel leads series, 1–0

The ULTRA, Pasig, Metro Manila

Ramon Fernandez played superb, aside from 36 points, dishing out a lot of brilliant assists that sparked the Beermen's breakaway from the very first quarter, the Zoom Masters fell behind by as much as 39 points going into the last quarter.

=== Game 2 ===
Vintage

May 14
6:30 pm

boxscores

San Miguel Beermen 114, Formula Shell Zoom Masters 107
Scoring by quarter: 25–19, 30–25, 27–32, 32–31
Pts: Michael Phelps 28	Pts: Bobby Parks 50
San Miguel leads series, 2–0

The ULTRA, Pasig, Metro Manila

Shell remained in the fight until the last minute, the Zoom Masters cut down every sizable lead of the Beermen, Fernandez lead his team in hanging tough whenever the Zoom Masters threatened with repeated rallies.

=== Game 3 ===
Vintage

May 16
7:30 pm

San Miguel Beermen 130, Formula Shell Zoom Masters 124
Scoring by quarter: 36–31, 27–30, 39–39, 28–24
Pts: Michael Phelps 33	Pts: Bobby Parks 54
San Miguel leads series, 3–0

The ULTRA, Pasig, Metro Manila

The Zoom Masters were up by four, 124–120, with about two minutes left, a spate of errors and bad plays saw them blank the rest of the way in a 10–0 blast by San Miguel in the endgame, Bobby Parks committed a lane violation on the inbound play, with the Beermen on top, 125–124.

=== Game 4 ===
Vintage

May 18
6:30 pm

San Miguel Beermen 104, Formula Shell Zoom Masters 115
Scoring by quarter: 26–29, 24–32, 26–33, 28–21
Pts: Michael Phelps 46	Pts: Bobby Parks 46 Benjie Paras 27
San Miguel leads series, 3–1

The ULTRA, Pasig, Metro Manila

Capitalizing on the absence of four-time MVP Ramon Fernandez, who was sideline due to a right, wrist sprain, the Zoom Masters leaned on the heroics of Benjie Paras and Bobby Parks to prevent a series shutout. From a 61–50 halftime lead, the Shell Zoom Masters doubled the margin and got their biggest lead at 80–57 midway in the third period.

=== Game 5 ===
Vintage

May 21
6:30 pm

San Miguel Beermen 123, Formula Shell Zoom Masters 105
Scoring by quarter: 22–24, 27–22, 32–29, 42–30
Pts: Michael Phelps 31	Pts: Bobby Parks 30
San Miguel wins series, 4–1

The ULTRA, Pasig, Metro Manila

After keeping Shell at bay for three quarters, San Miguel broke the game wide open in the final period in a scintillating display of teamwork and hardcourt brilliance. The Zoom Masters made a gallant stand but ran out of gas and could not stop the highly charged Beermen from winning the title.

1989 PBA Open Conference Champions

San Miguel Beermen
Sixth title

== Awards ==
SCOOP Most Outstanding Local player in the finals series: Hector Calma (San Miguel Beer)

== Rosters ==
San Miguel Beermen roster
Players
Coaches

Pos.	No.	Nat.	Name	Ht.	Wt.
F	4	(Philippines)	Elmer Reyes	6 ft 1 in (1.85 m)		San Beda
G	5	(Philippines)	Franz Pumaren	5 ft 9 in (1.75 m)		De La Salle
G	6	(Philippines)	Ato Agustin	5 ft 11 in (1.80 m)		Lyceum
G	7	(Philippines)	Alfie Almario	6 ft 0 in (1.83 m)		De La Salle
F	8	(Philippines)	Bobby Jose	6 ft 3 in (1.91 m)		UST
F	9	(Philippines)	Samboy Lim	6 ft 0 in (1.83 m)		Letran
F	10	(Philippines)	Alvin Teng	6 ft 4 in (1.93 m)		Arellano
C	11	(Philippines)	Tonichi Yturri	6 ft 5 in (1.96 m)		De La Salle
F	12	(Philippines)	Yves Dignadice	6 ft 4 in (1.93 m)		STI WNU
G	14	(Philippines)	Hector Calma	5 ft 9 in (1.75 m)		Adamson
F	15	(Philippines)	Ricardo Cui	6 ft 3 in (1.91 m)		Lyceum
F	17	(Philippines)	Jeffrey Graves	6 ft 3 in (1.91 m)		Angeles
C	19	(Philippines)	Ramon Fernandez	6 ft 4 in (1.93 m)		San Carlos
G/F	25	(United States)	Michael Phelps (I)	6 ft 3 in (1.91 m)		Alcorn State

Head coach

- (United States) Norman Black

Assistant coach(es)

- (Philippines) Derrick Pumaren

Legend

- (C) Team captain
- (I) Import
- Injured

Formula Shell Zoom Masters roster
Players
Coaches

Pos.	No.	Nat.	Name	Ht.	Wt.
G	1	(Philippines)	Jaime Manansala	5 ft 11 in (1.80 m)		UE
F	2	(Philippines)	Jay Ramirez	6 ft 2 in (1.88 m)		Visayas
G	5	(Philippines)	Ronnie Magsanoc	5 ft 9 in (1.75 m)		UP Diliman
F	8	(Philippines)	Jerry Ruiz	6 ft 2 in (1.88 m)		Letran
G	9	(Philippines)	Ramon Dela Cruz	5 ft 11 in (1.80 m)		Philippine Christian
G/F	10	(Philippines)	Freddie Hubalde	6 ft 1 in (1.85 m)		Mapúa
F	11	(Philippines)	Arnie Tuadles	6 ft 2 in (1.88 m)		Visayas
F	12	(Philippines)	Romeo Dela Rosa	6 ft 2 in (1.88 m)		Southwestern-U
G	13	(Philippines)	Leo Austria	5 ft 10 in (1.78 m)		Lyceum
C	14	(Philippines)	Benjie Paras	6 ft 5 in (1.96 m)		UP Diliman
F	22	(United States)	Bobby Parks (I)	6 ft 3 in (1.91 m)		Memphis
G/F	32	(Philippines)	Timoteo Coloso	6 ft 2 in (1.88 m)		Letran
G	33	(Philippines)	Calvin Tuadles	5 ft 11 in (1.80 m)		Southwestern-U

Head coach

- (Philippines) Dante Silverio

Assistant coach(es)

- (Philippines) Arlene Rodriguez

Legend

- (C) Team captain
- (I) Import
- Injured

== Broadcast notes ==
Game	Play-by-play	Analyst	Courtside reporters
Game 1	Joe Cantada	Joaqui Trillo	
Game 2	Sev Sarmenta	Andy Jao	
Game 3	Joe Cantada	Joaqui Trillo	
Game 4	Sev Sarmenta	Andy Jao	
Game 5	Ed Picson	Quinito Henson	Romy Kintanar and Ronnie Nathanielsz
