= 1989 PBA All-Filipino Conference finals =

Basketball championship

| Team | Coach | Wins |
|---|---|---|
| San Miguel Beermen | Norman Black | 4 |
| Purefoods Hotdogs | Baby Dalupan | 2 |
- Dates: August 22 – September 3, 1989
- Television: Vintage Sports (PTV)
- Radio network: DZSR

Referees
- Game 1: G. Ledesma, E. de Leon, R. Hines
- Game 2: G. Ledesma, I. Valera, R. Hines
- Game 3: G. Ledesma, D. Bayais, R. Hines
- Game 6: D. Bayais, E. de Leon, S. Cordero

PBA All-Filipino Conference finals chronology
- < 1988 1990 >

The 1989 PBA Fiesta All-Filipino Conference finals was the best-of-7 series basketball championship of the 1989 PBA All-Filipino Conference, and the conclusion of the conference's playoffs. The San Miguel Beermen and Purefoods Hotdogs played for the 43rd championship contested by the league. This is the first All-Filipino finals series that will be competed in a best-of-seven format.

San Miguel Beermen won their first All-Filipino crown and seventh PBA title with a 4–2 series victory against the Purefoods Hotdogs. The Beermen had won five of the last six conferences and are now getting close towards their bid for a possible grandslam.

== Qualification ==
| Purefoods | | San Miguel |
|---|---|---|
| Finished 9–2 (.818), 1st | Eliminations | Finished 8–3 (.727), 2nd |
| Finished 14–5 (.737), 1st | Semifinals | Finished 12–7 (.632), 2nd |

== Series scoring summary ==
| Team | Game 1 | Game 2 | Game 3 | Game 4 | Game 5 | Game 6 | Wins |
|---|---|---|---|---|---|---|---|
| San Miguel | 112 | 119 | 122 | 119 | 136 | 128 | 4 |
| Purefoods | 120 | 111 | 109 | 113 | 142 | 109 | 2 |
| Venue | ULTRA | ULTRA | ULTRA | ULTRA | ULTRA | ULTRA |

== Games summary ==
=== Game 1 ===
Vintage

August 22
7:20 pm

San Miguel Beermen 112, Purefoods Hotdogs 120
Scoring by quarter: 35–25, 19–36, 24–32, 34–27
| Pts: Ramon Fernandez 23 | Pts: Jerry Codiñera 30 |
Purefoods leads series, 1–0

The ULTRA, Pasig, Metro Manila
Referees: G. Ledesma, E. de Leon, R. Hines

The Hotdogs caught fire in the third quarter and had their largest lead of 15 points as Nelson Asaytono strung up 10 of his 12 points during that period, Lastimosa, Solis, Capacio and Alolor took turns hitting from the perimeter to propel Purefoods to seven 15-point spreads, the last at 114–99, 3:26 remaining, San Miguel tried desperately to overhaul the Purefoods lead as Ramon Fernandez, Yves Dignadice and Bobby Jose caught fire to close the gap, 108–114.

=== Game 2 ===
Vintage

August 24
7:20 pm

San Miguel Beermen 119, Purefoods Hotdogs 111
Scoring by quarter: 25–20, 32–20, 27–34, 35–37
| Pts: Ramon Fernandez 30 | Pts: Alvin Patrimonio 32 |
Series tied, 1–1

The ULTRA, Pasig, Metro Manila
Referees: G. Ledesma, I. Valera, R. Hines

San Miguel led by as much as 18 in the second quarter, 55–37, but the Hotdogs managed to come back from that deficit to close in at 55–61, the Beermen stretch their lead back to 15 at 80–65, Ramon Fernandez outplayed Jerry Codinera in the closing four minutes to preserve the Beermen's triumph.

=== Game 3 ===
Vintage

August 27
6:20 pm

San Miguel Beermen 122, Purefoods Hotdogs 109
Scoring by quarter: 30–19, 18–30, 30–30, 44–30
| Pts: Ramon Fernandez 26 | Pts: Jerry Codiñera 24 |
San Miguel leads series, 2–1

The ULTRA, Pasig, Metro Manila
Referees: G. Ledesma, D. Bayais, R. Hines

Purefoods open up leads of 69–58 and 73–63 in the third quarter when Glenn Capacio and Jojo Lastimosa started hitting from the outside, Hector Calma and Samboy Lim presided over a late third quarter onslaught as the Beermen wrest the lead at 76–75, Ramon Fernandez and Ato Agustin sizzled in the final period, from an 86-all count, an 11–1 run by the Beermen gave them a 97–87 advantage and never look back, the Hotdogs big men fouled out one by one in the final two minutes.

=== Game 4 ===
Vintage

August 29
7:20 pm

San Miguel Beermen 119, Purefoods Hotdogs 113
Scoring by quarter: 22–29, 30–26, 36–26, 31–32
San Miguel leads series, 3–1

The ULTRA, Pasig, Metro Manila

Trailing by five early in the third period at 56–61, an 18–0 blast by San Miguel put them on top by 13 at 74–61, the Beermen keep answering every baskets the Hotdogs made for several 10-point leads in the fourth quarter until the final three minutes when Purefoods came up with a 9–2 spurt to inch closer at 113–110, rookie Ato Agustin went strong to the hoop and scored to give the Beermen a five-point edge.

=== Game 5 ===
Vintage

August 31
7:20 pm

San Miguel Beermen 136, Purefoods Hotdogs 142 (OT)
Scoring by quarter: 32–34, 35–26, 24–29, 31–33, Overtime: 14–20
| Pts: Alvin Patrimonio 37 |
San Miguel leads series, 3–2

The ULTRA, Pasig, Metro Manila
Referees: G. Ledesma, I. Valera, R. Hines

Alvin Patrimonio was held scoreless in the first two quarters, San Miguel opened the third quarter with a ten straight points to up their lead to 17 at 77–60, the Hotdogs slowly came back as Patrimonio finally began to find his range, Purefoods was down by only two, 89–91, going into the last 12 minutes, the Hotdogs got their first taste of the lead in a long while at 95–94, as game five reached its down-to-the-wire finish, Purefoods led by seven, 116–109, when Samboy Lim spearheaded a 9–1 San Miguel attack to regain the upper hand at 118–117, with the score tied at 120-all, only few seconds remaining, Tonichi Yturri scored on a perfect assists pass, on the resume play, Jojo Lastimosa was fouled with 10 ticks left, Lastimosa converted his two free throws to tie the count at 122-all, the game went into overtime, San Miguel last tasted the lead at 129–128 on Bobby Jose's triple but Patrimonio, Asaytono and Capacio orchestrate a strong 12–5 finishing kick as San Miguel key players fouled out in succession. Alvin Patrimonio finish with a series-high 37 points.

=== Game 6 ===
Vintage

September 3
6:30 pm

San Miguel Beermen 128, Purefoods Hotdogs 109
Scoring by quarter: 26–30, 31–18, 28–29, 43–32
| Pts: Elmer Reyes 25 | Pts: Alvin Patrimonio 31 |
San Miguel wins series, 4–2

The ULTRA, Pasig, Metro Manila
Referees: D. Bayais, E. de Leon, S. Cordero

The Hotdogs were able to take the first quarter at 30–26. Hector Calma, Renato Agustin, Bobby Jose and Alvin Teng came up with an 8–0 bomb starting the second quarter to give San Miguel a 34–30 advantage. At the end of the first 24 minutes of play, the Beermen enjoyed a nine-point spread at 57–48.

Early in the fourth quarter, a three-point play by Samboy Lim off Jojo Lastimosa gave San Miguel a 12-point margin at 90–78. The Beermen padded their lead to 21 points on an 11–0 blitz, starring Samboy Lim and Ramon Fernandez to put them beyond reach, 101–80, with 7:09 remaining in the game. The Hotdogs were held to no more than three points in the first five minutes of the final quarter.

Purefoods gamely fought back, capitalizing on several miscues by the Beermen to cut the deficit to 13 points, 93–106 on a 6–0 run, time down to 4:24. That was the last hurrah for Purefoods as Elmer Reyes did the finishing job by touching off another 8–0 salvo that all but broke the backs of the Hotdogs, 114–93.

1989 PBA Fiesta All-Filipino Conference champions

San Miguel Beermen
Seventh title

== Rosters ==
San Miguel Beermen roster
Players
Coaches

| Pos. | # | POB | Name | Height | Weight | DOB (YYYY–MM–DD) | From |
|---|---|---|---|---|---|---|---|
| F | 4 | (Philippines) | Elmer Reyes | 6 ft 1 in (1.85 m) | 170 lb (77 kg) | | San Beda |
| G | 5 | (Philippines) | Franz Pumaren | 5 ft 9 in (1.75 m) | 165 lb (75 kg) | | De La Salle |
| G | 6 | (Philippines) | Ato Agustin | 5 ft 11 in (1.80 m) | 165 lb (75 kg) | | Lyceum |
| F | 7 | (Philippines) | Alfie Almario | 6 ft 2 in (1.88 m) | 200 lb (91 kg) | | De La Salle |
| F | 8 | (Philippines) | Bobby Jose | 6 ft 3 in (1.91 m) | 192 lb (87 kg) | | UST |
| F | 9 | (Philippines) | Samboy Lim | 6 ft 0 in (1.83 m) | 180 lb (82 kg) | | Letran |
| F | 10 | (Philippines) | Alvin Teng | 6 ft 4 in (1.93 m) | 187 lb (85 kg) | | Arellano |
| C | 11 | (Philippines) | Tonichi Yturri | 6 ft 6 in (1.98 m) | 185 lb (84 kg) | | De La Salle |
| F | 12 | (Philippines) | Yves Dignadice | 6 ft 4 in (1.93 m) | 210 lb (95 kg) | | STI WNU |
| G | 14 | (Philippines) | Hector Calma | 5 ft 8 in (1.73 m) | 155 lb (70 kg) | | Adamson |
| F | 15 | (Philippines) | Ricky Cui | 6 ft 3 in (1.91 m) | 170 lb (77 kg) | | Lyceum |
| F | 17 | (Philippines) | Jeffrey Graves | 6 ft 3 in (1.91 m) | 187 lb (85 kg) | | Angeles |
| F/C | 19 | (Philippines) | Ramon Fernandez | 6 ft 4 in (1.93 m) | 174 lb (79 kg) | | San Carlos |

Head coach

- (United States) Norman Black

Assistant coach(es)

- (Philippines) Derrick Pumaren

Legend

- (C) Team captain
- (CI) Commissioner's Cup Import
- (GI) Governors' Cup Import
- (EI) EASL Import
- (DP) Unsigned draft pick
- (FA) Free agent
- (IN) Inactive
- (S) Suspended
- (R) Rookie
- Injured

Purefoods Hotdogs roster
Players
Coaches

| Pos. | # | POB | Name | Height | Weight | DOB (YYYY–MM–DD) | From |
|---|---|---|---|---|---|---|---|
| G/F | 2 | (Philippines) | Alejo Alolor | 6 ft 1 in (1.85 m) | 160 lb (73 kg) | | Visayas |
| C | 5 | (Philippines) | Sonny Cabatu | 6 ft 5 in (1.96 m) | 205 lb (93 kg) | | PSBA |
| G | 6 | (Philippines) | Jojo Lastimosa | 6 ft 1 in (1.85 m) | 180 lb (82 kg) | | USJ–R |
| G | 7 | (Philippines) | Tony Dela Cerna | 6 ft 0 in (1.83 m) | 170 lb (77 kg) | | Baguio |
| G | 8 | (Philippines) | Al Solis | 5 ft 11 in (1.80 m) | 180 lb (82 kg) | | Visayas |
| F | 9 | (Philippines) | Naning Valenciano | 6 ft 1 in (1.85 m) | 185 lb (84 kg) | | USLS |
| G | 10 | (Philippines) | Dindo Pumaren | 5 ft 9 in (1.75 m) | 170 lb (77 kg) | | De La Salle |
| F | 11 | (Philippines) | Nelson Asaytono | 6 ft 3 in (1.91 m) | 220 lb (100 kg) | | Manila |
| G | 12 | (Philippines) | Glenn Capacio | 6 ft 1 in (1.85 m) | 185 lb (84 kg) | | Far Eastern |
| C | 14 | (Philippines) | Jack Tanuan | 6 ft 5 in (1.96 m) | 215 lb (98 kg) | | Far Eastern |
| F | 16 | (Philippines) | Alvin Patrimonio | 6 ft 3 in (1.91 m) | 215 lb (98 kg) | | Mapúa |
| G | 25 | (Philippines) | Pido Jarencio | 5 ft 10 in (1.78 m) | 170 lb (77 kg) | | UST |
| C | 44 | (Philippines) | Jerry Codiñera | 6 ft 5 in (1.96 m) | 245 lb (111 kg) | | UE |

Head coach

- (Philippines) Baby Dalupan

Assistant coach(es)

- (Philippines) Cris Calilan
- (Philippines) Ely Capacio

Legend

- (C) Team captain
- (CI) Commissioner's Cup Import
- (GI) Governors' Cup Import
- (EI) EASL Import
- (DP) Unsigned draft pick
- (FA) Free agent
- (IN) Inactive
- (S) Suspended
- (R) Rookie
- Injured

== Broadcast notes ==
| Game | Play-by-play | Analyst |
|---|---|---|
| Game 1 | Joe Cantada | Joaqui Trillo |
| Game 2 | Ed Picson | Joaqui Trillo |
| Game 3 | Joe Cantada | Quinito Henson |
| Game 4 | Sev Sarmenta | Andy Jao |
| Game 5 | Joe Cantada | Joaqui Trillo |
| Game 6 | Sev Sarmenta | Andy Jao |
