= Elmer Reyes =

Filipino retired basketball player

Personal information
- Born: December 3, 1958 (age 67)
- Listed height: 6 ft 1 in (1.85 m)
- Listed weight: 170 lb (77 kg)

Career information
- College: San Beda
- Position: Small forward

Career history
- –: Presto
- 1984–1985: Northern Cement
- 1987–1989: San Miguel Beermen
- 1990: Pop Cola Panthers
- 1991–1992: Purefoods Tender Juicy Hotdogs

Career highlights
- As player: 8× PBA champion (1985 Reinforced, 1987 Reinforced, 1988 Open, 1988 Reinforced, 1989 Open, 1989 All-Filipino, 1989 Reinforced, 1991 All-Filipino); 2x William Jones Cup champion (1981, 1985)
Medals
Men's basketball
Representing Philippines
ABC Championship
Gold medal – first place	1985 Kuala Lumpur	Team
FIBA Asia Club Championship
Gold medal – first place	1984 Ipoh	Team
Asian Games
Bronze medal – third place	1986 Seoul	Team
SEA Games
Gold medal – first place	1981 Manila	Team
Gold medal – first place	1983 Singapore	Team
Gold medal – first place	1985 Bangkok	Team

Elmer Reyes is a Filipino former professional basketball player.

== Career ==
=== College ===
Pre-1980s, Reyes played for the San Beda Red Lions in the National Collegiate Athletic Association helping the team win two consecutive titles.

=== Club ===
==== Presto ====
Reyes played for the Presto in the now-defunct Manila Industrial and Commercial Athletic Association.

==== Northern Cement ====
He would be part of the Philippines national team which played as a club under the name Northern Cement. This includes the 1981 William Jones Cup in Taiwan which Northern Cement won. Northern Cement with Reyes also bagged the 1984 Asian Basketball Club Championship title earning them a berth in the 1985 FIBA Club World Cup.

Reyes would be part of the team's guest team participation in the Philippine Basketball Association from 1984 to 1985. They became the first locally-based guest team to win a title when they became the champions of the 1985 Reinforced Conference.

Additionally Northern Cement competed under the club name "San Miguel" in the 1985 William Jones Cup which it also won.

==== San Miguel, Pop Cola, and Purefoods ====
From 1987 to 1989, Reyes played for franchise PBA team, San Miguel Beermen helping them win six conference titles. In 1990, he moved to expansion team Pop Cola Panthers. Reyes would then move to Purefoods Tender Juicy Hotdogs helping them win the 1991 All-Filipino Conference title. He would retire in 1992.

=== National team ===
Reyes would train with the Philippines national team as early as 1980 under the Northern Cement program of sports patron Danding Cojuangco. His debut would be in the 1981 SEA Games in Manila where the team clinched a gold.

As part of the under-18 youth team, Reyes would help the team win the 1982 ABC Under-18 Championship title, also at home.

This was followed by SEA Games golds in the 1983 edition in Singapore and 1985 edition in Bangkok. The team won a title at the 1985 ABC Championship in Kuala Lumpur and consequentially a berth in the 1986 FIBA World Championship in Spain, although the team withdrew due to the People Power Revolution. Reyes last stint with the Philippines was in the 1986 Asian Games where the team bagged a bronze.

== Personal life ==
His son Raphy Reyes is also a professional basketball player.
