= Mike Phelps =

American basketball player (born 1961)

Personal information
- Born: October 3, 1961 (age 65) Vicksburg, Mississippi, U.S.
- Listed height: 6 ft 4 in (1.93 m)
- Listed weight: 180 lb (82 kg)

Career information
- High school: Vicksburg (Vicksburg, Mississippi)
- College: Alcorn State (1981–1985)
- NBA draft: 1985: 7th round, 144th overall pick
- Drafted by: Seattle SuperSonics
- Position: Shooting guard
- Number: 25, 14

Career history
- 1985–1987: Seattle SuperSonics
- 1987-1988: Wyoming Wildcatters
- 1988: Los Angeles Clippers
- 1988: San Miguel Beermen
- 1988-1989: Pensacola Tornados
- 1989: San Miguel Beermen
- 1989-1990: Santa Barbara Islanders
- 1990: San Miguel Beermen
- 1990-1991: Sioux Falls Skyforce

Career highlights
- 2× PBA champion (1988 Reinforced, 1989 Open); SWAC Player of the Year (1985)
- Stats at NBA.com
- Stats at Basketball Reference

Michael Phelps (born October 3, 1961) is an American former professional basketball player. Born in Vicksburg, Mississippi, he attended Alcorn State University and was selected in the 7th round of the 1985 NBA draft by the Seattle SuperSonics.

Phelps played with the Sonics from 1985-87 for 130 total games. He later signed with the Los Angeles Clippers in 1988 but played in only 2 games.

He later took his talents overseas and found success in the Philippine Basketball Association where he played for the San Miguel Beermen, helping them win two conference championships in 1988 and 1989. The latter became the first of three consecutive conference titles the team will win that year to accomplish the Grand Slam title run becoming only the second team in the league to do so. Phelps played in one more conference with the team in 1990 but they failed to qualify for the semi-finals.

Phelps also played in the Continental Basketball Association (CBA) for the Wyoming Wildcatters (1987-88), the Pensacola Tornados (1988-89), the Santa Barbara Islanders (1989-90), and the Sioux Falls Skyforce (1990-91).

After retiring from basketball, Phelps and his wife, Patricia, settled back in Vicksburg to raise their two sons.. He is the first and only NBA player from Vicksburg, Missisippi. He was formally honored by his hometown when he was inducted into the Vicksburg Warren School District Athletic Hall of Fame in August 2017..

== Career statistics ==
Legend
GP	Games played	GS	Games started	MPG	Minutes per game
FG%	Field goal percentage	3P%	3-point field goal percentage	FT%	Free throw percentage
RPG	Rebounds per game	APG	Assists per game	SPG	Steals per game
BPG	Blocks per game	PPG	Points per game	**Bold**	Career high

=== NBA ===
==== Regular season ====
Year	Team	GP	GS	MPG	FG%	3P%	FT%	RPG	APG	SPG	BPG	PPG
1985–86	Seattle	**70**	**18**	**12.6**	.409	.083	.595	**1.3**	1.0	.6	.0	4.0
1986–87	Seattle	60	6	7.8	.426	**.100**	.705	.8	1.1	.4	.0	3.0
1987–88	L.A. Clippers	2	0	11.5	**.429**	–	**.750**	1.0	**1.5**	**2.5**	.0	**4.5**
Career		132	24	10.4	.416	.091	.639	1.1	1.0	.5	.0	3.6
