= Franz Pumaren =

Filipino basketball player, coach, and politician

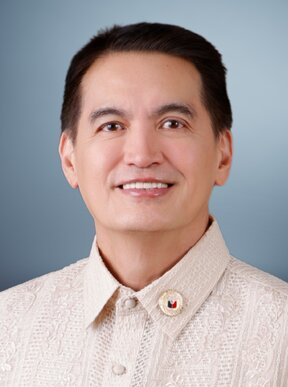
- Official portrait, 2026

Member of the House of Representatives from the Quezon City's 3rd district
- Incumbent
- Assumed office June 30, 2022
- Preceded by: Allan Benedict Reyes

Member of the Quezon City Council from the 3rd District
- In office June 30, 2013 – June 30, 2022
- In office June 30, 2001 – June 30, 2010
- In office June 30, 1992 – June 30, 1998

Personal details
- Born: Franz Santos Pumaren; February 5, 1962 (age 64) Ermita, Manila, Philippines
- Party: NUP (2018–present); SBP (local party; 2018–present)
- Other political affiliations: NPC (1992–1998; 2004–2018); LAMMP (1998); LDP (2001–03); Aksyon (2003–04)
- Parent: Pilo Pumaren (father)
- Relatives: Derrick Pumaren (brother); Dindo Pumaren (brother)
- Basketball career

Personal information
- Listed height: 5 ft 9 in (1.75 m)
- Listed weight: 165 lb (75 kg)

Career information
- College: De La Salle
- PBA draft: 1986:
- Playing career: 1985–1998
- Position: Point guard
- Number: 5
- Coaching career: 1998–2021

Career history

Playing
- 1985: Northern Cement
- 1986–1997: San Miguel Beermen
- 1997–1998: Mobiline Cellulars

Coaching
- 1998–1999: Pop Cola Bottlers/800s (assistant)
- 1998–2009: De La Salle
- 2000–2002: Sta. Lucia Realtors (assistant)
- 2011–2014: Air21 Express
- 2015–2021: Adamson
- 2016–2017: GlobalPort Batang Pier

Career highlights
- As player: 10× PBA champion (1985 Reinforced, 1987 Reinforced, 1988 Open, 1988 Reinforced, 1989 Open, 1989 All-Filipino, 1989 Reinforced, 1992 All-Filipino, 1993 Governors', 1994 All-Filipino); PBA Grand Slam champion (1989); As head coach: 5× UAAP champion (1998–2001, 2007); PCCL champion (2008); 2× Filoil Flying V Preseason Cup champion (2006-2007); As assistant coach: PBA champion (2001 Governors')
Medals
Men's basketball
Representing Philippines
ABC Championship
Gold medal – first place	1985 Kuala Lumpur	Team
SEA Games
Gold medal – first place	1981 Manila	Team
Gold medal – first place	1985 Bangkok	Team

Franz Santos Pumaren (born February 5, 1962) is a Filipino former professional basketball player, coach and politician who is serving as the representative for Quezon City's 3rd district. He played college ball for De La Salle University before playing professional basketball in the Philippine Basketball Association (PBA). He is also the former coach of the Adamson Falcons in the UAAP.

== Basketball career ==
Pumaren played most of his professional career for the San Miguel Beermen where he won 9 championships with the team which also included the 1989 Grand Slam. He also played for the Mobiline Cellulars.

Pumaren formerly coached the De La Salle Green Archers from 1998 to 2009 where he led them to five men's basketball championships including a four-peat from 1998 to 2001, and his final championship with the team in 2007. As a coach for the Archers, he was known for implementing the full court press defense on opposing teams.

Pumaren is the head coach of the Air21 Express in the PBA, starting at the 2011-12 PBA season.

In December 2015, Pumaren appointed as the head coach of the Adamson Falcons men's basketball team in the UAAP, replacing Mike Fermin who was named as the assistant coach.·

Months after his appointment as Adamson's head coach, Pumaren joined the GlobalPort Batang Pier coaching staff as a head consultant of the team.

== Political career ==
Pumaren is also a politician from the 3rd District of Quezon City. The district includes the Araneta Coliseum, where majority of the PBA and UAAP games are held, and the campus of the Ateneo de Manila University, the rival of his alma mater, De La Salle University.

He first served as councilor for three consecutive terms from 2001 to 2010. He then resigned as La Salle coach in order to run for the 3rd district's seat in the House of Representatives. However, he lost to fellow councilor Jorge "Bolet" Banal Jr., coming at third behind defeated incumbent Matias Defensor Jr. with 28% of the vote.

He returned to the Quezon City Council when he was elected in 2013. He was re-elected in 2016 and 2019. He ran for representative at the 3rd district for the second time in 2022 under the ticket of Mayor Joy Belmonte, successfully defeating incumbent representative Allan Benedict Reyes. On July 26, 2022, Pumaren was named as one of the Deputy Majority Leaders of the House of Representatives in the 19th Congress of the Philippines.

== Coaching record ==
=== Collegiate record ===
Season	Team	PG	W	L	PCT	Finish	PG	PW	PL	PCT	Results
1998	DLSU	14	13	1	.929	1st	4	3	1	.750	Champion
1999	DLSU	14	11	3	.786	1st	5	4	1	.800	Champion
2000	DLSU	14	12	2	.857	1st	3	3	0	.1000	Champion
2001	DLSU	14	12	2	.857	1st	4	3	1	.750	Champion
2002	DLSU	14	13	1	.929	1st	4	2	2	.500	Runner-Up
2003	DLSU	14	7^{a}	7^{a}	.500^{a}	4th^{a}	1^{a}	0^{a}	1^{a}	.000^{a}	Semifinals^{a}
2004	DLSU	14	10^{a}	4^{a}	.714^{a}	2nd^{a}	4^{a}	2^{a}	2^{a}	.500^{a}	Champion^{a}
2005	DLSU	14	10^{a}	4^{a}	.714^{a}	2nd^{a}	3^{a}	1^{a}	2^{a}	.333^{a}	Runner-Up^{a}
2006	DLSU		—	—	—	—	—	—	—	—	Suspended
2007	DLSU	14	9	5	.643	2nd	5	4	1	.800	Champion
2008	DLSU	14	10	4	.714	2nd	4	2	2	.500	Runner-Up
2009	DLSU	14	5	9	.358	6th	—	—	—	—	Eliminated
2016	AdU	14	8	6	.571	4th	1	0	1	.000	Semifinals
2017	AdU	14	9	5	.643	3rd	1	0	1	.000	Semifinals
2018	AdU	14	10	4	.714	2nd	2	0	2	.000	Semifinals
2019	AdU	14	4	10	.286	6th	—	—	—	—	Eliminated
Totals		210	116	52	.690		33	21	12	.636	5 championships

^{a}La Salle's wins were later forfeited after La Salle admitted it fielded two ineligible players. Their 2004 championship was given to FEU. All of the following records were void and not counted.

=== Professional record ===
Season	Team	Conference	Elimination round					Playoffs				
Season	Team	Conference	GP	W	L	PCT	Finish	GP	W	L	PCT	Results
2011–12	Shopinas.com/Air21	Philippine	14	0	14	.000	10th	—	—	—	—	Eliminated
2011–12	Shopinas.com/Air21	Commissioner's	9	3	6	.333	10th	—	—	—	—	Eliminated
2011–12	Shopinas.com/Air21	Governors	9	2	7	.222	10th	—	—	—	—	Eliminated
2012–13	Air21	Philippine	14	5	9	.357	8th	1	0	1	.000	Quarterfinals
2012–13	Air21	Commissioner's	14	6	8	.429	8th	1	0	1	.000	Quarterfinals
2012–13	Air21	Governors	9	3	6	.333	10th	—	—	—	—	Eliminated
2013–14	Air21	Philippine	14	3	11	.214	10th	—	—	—	—	Eliminated
2013–14	Air21	Commissioner's	9	3	6	.333	7th	7	4	3	.571	Semifinals
2013–14	Air21	Governors	9	5	4	.556	7th	1	0	1	.000	Quarterfinals
2016–17	GlobalPort	Philippine	11	6	5	.545	5th	2	0	2	.000	Quarterfinals
2016–17	GlobalPort	Commissioner's	11	4	7	.364	8th	2	1	1	.500	Quarterfinals
2016–17	GlobalPort	Governors	11	3	8	.273	10th	—	—	—	—	Eliminated
Totals			134	43	91	.320	Totals	14	5	9	.357	0 championship

House of Representatives of the Philippines
Preceded by Allan Benedict Reyes	Member of the House of Representatives from Quezon City's 3rd district 2022–present	Incumbent
Sporting positions
Preceded by Jong Uichico	De La Salle Green Archers basketball head coach 1998–2009	Succeeded by Dindo Pumaren
Preceded by Mike Fermin	Adamson Soaring Falcons basketball head coach 2016–2021	Succeeded by Nash Racela
