= Francois Wise =

American basketball player (born 1958)

Personal information
- Born: May 15, 1958 (age 68)
- Listed height: 6 ft 6 in (1.98 m)
- Listed weight: 220 lb (100 kg)

Career information
- High school: Balboa (San Francisco, California)
- College: Long Beach State (1976–1980)
- NBA draft: 1980: 4th round, 81st overall pick
- Drafted by: Washington Bullets
- Position: Power forward
- Number: 5, 32

Career history
- 1981–1982: U-Tex Wranglers
- 1982: Detroit Spirits
- 1983: Tanduay Rhum Makers
- 1985: Manila Beer Brewmasters
- 1987: Hills Bros. Coffee Kings
- Stats at Basketball Reference

Francois Wise (born May 15, 1958) is a retired American basketball player. He played four years for the varsity 49ers at Long Beach State in California. He was picked by the Washington Bullets on the fourth round of the 1980 NBA draft and was the 81st selection overall. Wise survived the Bullets rookie tryout and made the club's final 22-man roster. He was waived two weeks before the campaign started.

Wise performed in several summer leagues prior to reporting at the Bullets tryouts camp. He was listed in the 13-man lineup of coach Nate Lewis in the eight team San Francisco summer pro basketball league competitions held at Potrero Recreational Center from June 23 – August 14, 1980. Wise also played for the Lakers quintet in the Joe Weakley's Run, Shoot and Dunk recreational league that summer and performed in the league's all-star game, joining such stars as Larry Pounds, Kenny Tyler, Bulls rookie James Wilkes, Reggie Theus, Freeman Williams and Michael Cooper. His elder brother is Willie Wise, who played seven years in the defunct American Basketball Association and two seasons in the NBA.

He had overseas stints, mostly playing in the Philippines for the Philippine Basketball Association from 1981 to 1983, and again in 1985 and 1987. He also played in Mexico and also for the Detroit Spirits in the Continental Basketball Association. Wise joined the U/Tex Wranglers in 1981 upon the invitation of the team's coach Glenn McDonald. Wise later played for the Tanduay franchise and scored 74 points in a game on 10 August 1983. He also played for the Manila Beer and Hills Bros franchises. In a 118-game PBA career over five years, Wise averaged 36.7 points, 15.0 rebounds and 5.0 assists.

After his playing years, Wise spent 33 years as a police officer with the Los Angeles Police Department before retiring in February 2020. His son, Eric, also played as a PBA import for Barako Bull in the 2014 season.
