= Jeff Moore (basketball) =

American basketball player (1966-2022)

Personal information
- Born: March 15, 1966
- Died: November 29, 2022 (aged 56)
- Listed height: 6 ft 7 in (2.01 m)
- Listed weight: 220 lb (100 kg)

Career information
- College: Auburn (1984–1988)
- NBA draft: 1988: 3rd round, 58th overall pick
- Drafted by: Charlotte Hornets
- Position: Power forward / center

Career highlights
- Second-team All-SEC (1987)
- Stats at Basketball Reference

Jeff Moore (March 15, 1966) was an American basketball player. He was drafted by the Charlotte Hornets in the third round of 1988 NBA draft. He played his collegiate career for the Auburn Tigers men's basketball team from 1984 to 1988.

== College career ==
In his four seasons at Auburn, Moore was a two-time All-SEC player after taking over the starting center job following the departure of Charles Barkley to the NBA. He played in the NCAA tournament in each of his four seasons and left the school as its second all-time leader in rebounds with 950 and eight on the all-time scoring list with 1,549 career points.

== Professional career ==
Moore was drafted by the Charlotte Hornets in the third round of the 1988 NBA draft. On August 17, he signed a contract with the Hornets but was waived by the team on October 31, 1988, before the start of the regular season.

== Personal life and death ==
Moore died on November 29, 2022.
