= Hector Calma =

Filipino basketball player (born 1960)

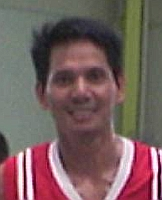
- Calma in 2004

Personal information
- Born: March 2, 1960 (age 66) Santa Ana, Pampanga, Philippines
- Listed height: 5 ft 8 in (1.73 m)
- Listed weight: 155 lb (70 kg)

Career information
- College: Adamson
- Playing career: 1985–1994
- Position: Point guard

Career history

Playing
- 1985: Northern Consolidated Cement
- 1986–94: Magnolia Cheese Makers/San Miguel Beermen

Coaching
- 2001: Pop Cola Panthers (assistant)

Career highlights
- As player: 9× PBA champion (1987 Reinforced, 1988 Open, 1988 Reinforced, 1989 Open, All-Filipino, 1989 Reinforced, 1992 All-Filipino, 1993 Governors', 1994 All-Filipino); 3× PBA All-Star (1989, 1990, 1993); 3x PBA Mythical First Team member; 50 Greatest Players in PBA History (2000 selection); As executive: 5× PBA champion (2002 All-Filipino, 2003 Reinforced, 2006-07 Philippine, 2009 Fiesta 2011 Governors')
Medals
Men's Basketball
Representing Philippines
ABC Championship
Gold medal – first place	1985 Kuala Lumpur	Team
FIBA Asia Club Championship
Gold medal – first place	1984 Ipoh	Team
Asian Games
Silver medal – second place	1990 Beijing	Team
SEA Games
Gold medal – first place	1983 Singapore	Team
Gold medal – first place	1985 Bangkok	Team

Hector Calma (born March 2, 1960) is a Filipino former professional basketball player. At 5 feet and 8 inches, he played at the point guard position and was most notably associated with the San Miguel Beer team of the Philippine Basketball Association (PBA).

== Collegiate and pre-PBA career ==
Calma first became known on the collegiate basketball scene as a point guard of the Adamson Falcons, which played in the UAAP. Calma was a member of the Adamson team which in 1977 captured for the first time the UAAP Men's Basketball Championship, a feat which the university has yet to accomplish again. Calma attained further prominence as a member of the national team which qualified for several international tournaments during the 1980s, under the patronage of Danding Cojuangco and the guidance of coach Ron Jacobs. He was at the helm of the 1982 squad that captured the Asian Youth Championship of that year, beating China in the finals. In 1985, with Calma starting at point guard, the national team unexpectedly captured the William Jones Cup, beating out in the process a highly regarded American team composed of NCAA Division I players and coached by Purdue's Gene Keady. The following year, the Philippine national team would win the Asian Basketball Confederation Championship for the first time since 1973.

During that period, his widely reported relationship with the swimmer (and future TV host) Christine Jacob also kept his name in the public eye. Calma eventually married Ines Ortiz, a former employee of the San Miguel public relations office.

== Professional career ==
=== Northern Cement ===
In 1985, the national team, under the banner of Northern Consolidated Cement, competed as a guest team in the PBA, winning the 1985 PBA Reinforced Conference. This marked Calma's first appearance in the PBA, albeit as an amateur playing with a guest team.

=== San Miguel ===
Calma's formal professional basketball career began at the age of 26 in the 1986 PBA Open Conference when he, along with several of his national teammates, were absorbed by San Miguel Beer when it rejoined the PBA under the name Magnolia Cheese after a brief period of disbandment. Within a year, the renamed San Miguel Beer, coached by Norman Black, would win its first PBA Championship with Calma starting at point guard.

From 1987 to 1989, San Miguel would win 6 of 7 PBA conference championships, including the coveted Grand Slam in 1989. Calma was not known for his scoring, but his skills as a playmaker sparked the SMB offense during those storied years. He was also voted 3X Finals MVP on their Grand Slam success. In a team that featured explosive scorers such as Samboy Lim, Ricardo Brown, and Ramon Fernandez, Calma's playmaking skills was highly regarded. As a result, Calma was named three times to the PBA Mythical First Team, in 1987, 1988, and 1989. During those 3 years, Calma posted average of 10.6 points (on 50.3% shooting) and 5.3 assists per game. Yet as the 1990 official PBA Annual noted, "Numbers just can't fully-determine this little guy's true worth - he just creates so many offensive situations which most often draw the line between victory and defeat."

After the FIBA allowed in 1989 the participation of professional basketball players in international competitions, Calma was recruited twice to rejoin the Philippine National Team. Calma played in the 1990 and 1994 teams that participated in the Asian Games, the 1990 team capturing the silver medal.

=== Retirement ===
Calma's career faded in the 1990s with the emergence of younger point guards such as Ronnie Magsanoc and Johnny Abarrientos. Adding to this were the injuries he sustained both from his collegiate and professional years. Alongside teammate Ramon Fernandez, he decided to leave basketball as both players announced their retirement before the start of the 1995 season of the PBA.

== Managerial career ==
After his retirement, Calma became involved in the front office of the Coca-Cola Tigers from 2002 to 2006, and the San Miguel Beermen. He served as the team manager of the Beermen until the end of 2013.

In 2000, Calma was named to the PBA's 25th Anniversary All-Time Team. He was joined in that honor by two of his teammates from the SMB Grand Slam team, Ramon Fernandez and Samboy Lim

== Personal life ==
His son, Andres, is a motorsports rider, having won a championship title in the Vios Cup Season 2 in 2015.

== See also ==
- Philippine Basketball Association
- Philippine national basketball team
- San Miguel Beermen
- History of Philippine Basketball
- PBA's 25th Anniversary All-Time Team
- Ron Jacobs

== Notes ==
Preceded by First	Coca-Cola Tigers Team Manager; 2005–2006	Succeeded by Allan Caidic
Preceded by Samboy Lim	San Miguel Beermen Team Manager; 2006–2013	Succeeded by Siot Tanquingcen
