= Alfie Almario =

Filipino basketball player

Alfred Joseph P. Almario
Personal information
- Born: April 12, 1963 Cebu City, Philippines
- Died: October 3, 2001 (aged 38) Ramon, Isabela, Philippines
- Listed height: 6 ft 2 in (1.88 m)
- Listed weight: 200 lb (91 kg)

Career information
- College: De La Salle
- Drafted by: Magnolia Cheese Makers
- Playing career: 1986–1990
- Position: Small forward / power forward
- Number: 7

Career history
- 1986–1990: San Miguel Beermen
Medals
Men's basketball
Representing Philippines
ABC Championship
Gold medal – first place	1985 Kuala Lumpur	Team
SEA Games
Gold medal – first place	1983 Singapore	Team

Alfie Almario (April 12, 1963 – October 3, 2001) was a Filipino former professional basketball player in the Philippine Basketball Association (PBA).

== Career ==
Almario played collegiate basketball at DLSU and was one of the vital cogs of Northern Consolidated Cement squad which later became the core of the San Miguel Beermen.

He was noted as the Triggerman of the RP Youth team that crushed China for the ABC youth championship at the Araneta Coliseum in 1982. Among his teammates in the team were Hector Calma, Leo Austria, Derrick Pumaren, Jong Uichico, Elmer Reyes, Jun Tan, the late Teddy Alfarero and the late Rey Cuenco. He was also part of the national team that captured the internationally acclaimed Jones Cup in 1985.

He then played for the San Miguel Beermen from 1986 to 1990, averaging 4.6 ppg under coach Norman Black, and was a member of the 1989 Grand Slam team. He retired from basketball in 1990 to concentrate on coaching and golf.

== Death ==
Almario died of a heart attack on October 3, 2001, while visiting his fish farm in Ramon, Isabela.
