= 1991 PBA All-Filipino Conference =

- Duration: June 9 - September 1, 1991
- TV partner(s): Vintage Sports (PTV)

Finals
- Champions: Purefoods TJ Hotdogs
- Runners-up: Diet Sarsi Sizzlers

PBA All-Filipino Conference chronology
- < 1990 1992 >

PBA conference chronology
- < 1991 First 1991 Third >

The 1991 Philippine Basketball Association (PBA) All-Filipino Conference was the second conference of the 1991 PBA season. It started on June 9 and ended on September 1, 1991. The tournament is an All-Filipino format, which doesn't require an import or a pure-foreign player for each team.

== Format ==
The following format will be observed for the duration of the conference:

- The teams were divided into 2 groups.

Group A:

1. Ginebra San Miguel
2. Pepsi Hotshots
3. Tivoli Full Cream Milk
4. San Miguel Beermen

Group B:

1. Alaska Milkmen
2. Shell Rimula X Turbo Chargers
3. Purefoods TJ Hotdogs
4. Diet Sarsi Sizzlers

- Teams in a group will play against each other once and against teams in the other group twice; 11 games per team; Teams are then seeded by basis on win–loss records. Ties are broken among point differentials of the tied teams. Standings will be determined in one league table; teams do not qualify by basis of groupings.
- The top five teams after the eliminations will advance to the semifinals.
- Semifinals will be two round robin affairs with the remaining five teams. Results from the eliminations will be carried over. A playoff incentive for a finals berth will be given to the team that will win at least five of their eight semifinal games.
- The top two teams (or the top team and the winner of the playoff incentive) will face each other in a best-of-five championship series. The next two teams (or the loser of the playoff incentive and the fourth seeded team) dispute the third-place trophy in a best of three playoff.

== Elimination round ==
=== Team standings ===
Pos	Team	W	L	PCT	GB	Qualification
1	Diet Sarsi Sizzlers	8	3	.727	—	Semifinal round
2	Purefoods Tender Juicy Hotdogs	7	4	.636	1	Semifinal round
3	San Miguel Beermen	6	5	.545	2	Semifinal round
4	Tivoli Milkmasters	6	5	.545	2	Semifinal round
5	Alaska Milkmen	6	5	.545	2	Semifinal round
6	Ginebra San Miguel	4	7	.364	4	
7	Shell Rimula X	4	7	.364	4	
8	Pepsi Hotshots	3	8	.273	5	

== Semifinal round ==
=== Team standings ===
Overall standings
Pos	Team	W	L	PCT	GB	Qualification
1	Purefoods Tender Juicy Hotdogs	12	7	.632 (Note: Head-to-head differential: Purefoods +2, Diet Sarsi −2)	—	Advance to the finals (Note: If a team outside the top two teams wins at least five semifinal round games, then it and the second-placed team will playoff for the last finals berth; otherwise, the top 2 teams qualify outright.)
2	Diet Sarsi Sizzlers	12	7	.632	—	Guaranteed finals berth playoff
3	San Miguel Beermen	11	8	.579	1	Qualify to finals berth playoff
4	Alaska Milkmen	10	9	.526	2	Proceed to third place playoffs
5	Tivoli Milkmasters	8	11	.421	4	

Notes:

Semifinal round standings
Pos	Team	W	L	Qualification
1	San Miguel Beermen	5	3	Qualify to finals berth playoff (Note: Purefoods advanced to the finals outright as #1 seeded team; finals berth playoff: Diet Sarsi 100–95 San Miguel)
2	Purefoods Tender Juicy Hotdogs	5	3	
3	Alaska Milkmen	4	4	
4	Diet Sarsi Sizzlers	4	4	
5	Tivoli Milkmasters	2	6	

== Finals berth playoff ==
Vintage

August 20

Diet Sarsi Sizzlers 100, San Miguel Beermen 95

The ULTRA, Pasig

== Third place playoffs ==
Vintage

August 22

San Miguel Beermen 99, Alaska Milkmen 101

The ULTRA, Pasig

Vintage

August 25

San Miguel Beermen 106, Alaska Milkmen 96

The ULTRA, Pasig

Vintage

August 27

San Miguel Beermen 93, Alaska Milkmen 108
Alaska wins series, 2–1

The ULTRA, Pasig

== Finals ==
Vintage

August 22

Purefoods TJ Hotdogs 107, Diet Sarsi Sizzlers 111

The ULTRA, Pasig

Vintage

August 25

Purefoods TJ Hotdogs 112, Diet Sarsi Sizzlers 102

The ULTRA, Pasig

Vintage

August 27

Purefoods TJ Hotdogs 105, Diet Sarsi Sizzlers 109

The ULTRA, Pasig

Vintage

August 29

Purefoods TJ Hotdogs 115, Diet Sarsi Sizzlers 105

The ULTRA, Pasig

Vintage

September 1

Purefoods TJ Hotdogs 107, Diet Sarsi Sizzlers 100
Purefoods wins series, 3–2

The ULTRA, Pasig
