= 1991 PBA First Conference =

- Duration: February 17 – May 19, 1991
- TV partner(s): Vintage Sports (PTV)

Finals
- Champions: Ginebra San Miguel
- Runners-up: Shell Rimula X

Awards
- Best Import: Bobby Parks (Shell Rimula X)

PBA First Conference chronology
- < 1990 1992 >

PBA conference chronology
- < 1990 Third 1991 All-Filipino >

The 1991 Philippine Basketball Association (PBA) First Conference was the opening conference of the 1991 PBA season. It started on February 17 and ended on May 19, 1991. The tournament allows one-import each per team.

== Format ==
The following format will be observed for the duration of the conference:

- The teams were divided into 2 groups.

Group A:

1. Ginebra San Miguel
2. Pepsi Hotshots
3. Presto Tivoli Ice Cream
4. San Miguel Beermen

Group B:

1. Alaska Milkmen
2. Shell Rimula X Turbo Chargers
3. Purefoods Hotdogs
4. Diet Sarsi Sizzlers

- Teams in a group will play against each other once and against teams in the other group twice; 11 games per team; Teams are then seeded by basis on win–loss records. Ties are broken among point differentials of the tied teams. Standings will be determined in one league table; teams do not qualify by basis of groupings.
- The top five teams after the eliminations will advance to the semifinals.
- Semifinals will be two round robin affairs with the remaining teams. Results from the elimination round will be carried over. A playoff incentive for a finals berth will be given to the team that will win at least five of their eight semifinal games.
- The top two teams (or the top team and the winner of the playoff incentive) will face each other in a best-of-seven championship series. The next two teams will qualify for a best-of-five playoff for third place.

== Elimination round ==
=== Team standings ===
Pos	Team	W	L	PCT	GB	Qualification
1	Shell Rimula X	8	3	.727	—	Semifinal round
2	San Miguel Beermen	7	4	.636	1	Semifinal round
3	Purefoods Tender Juicy Hotdogs	6	5	.545	2	Semifinal round
4	Diet Sarsi Sizzlers	6	5	.545	2	Semifinal round
5	Ginebra San Miguel	5	6	.455	3	Semifinal round
6	Presto Tivolis	4	7	.364	4	
7	Alaska Milkmen	4	7	.364	4	
8	Pepsi Hotshots	4	7	.364	4	

== Semifinal round ==
=== Team standings ===
Overall standings
Pos	Team	W	L	PCT	GB	Qualification
1	Shell Rimula X	12	7	.632 (Note: Head-to-head record: Shell 3–1 Ginebra)	—	Advance to the finals
2	Ginebra San Miguel	12	7	.632	—	Advance to the finals
3	Purefoods Tender Juicy Hotdogs	10	9	.526	2	Proceed to third place playoffs
4	Diet Sarsi Sizzlers	9	10	.474 (Note: Head-to-head record: Diet Sarsi 3–1 San Miguel)	3	Proceed to third place playoffs
5	San Miguel Beermen	9	10	.474	3	

Notes:

Semifinal round standings
Pos	Team	W	L
1	Ginebra San Miguel	7	1
2	Shell Rimula X	4	4
3	Purefoods Tender Juicy Hotdogs	4	4
4	Diet Sarsi Sizzlers	3	5
5	San Miguel Beermen	2	6

== Third place playoffs ==
Vintage

May 5

Purefoods Tender Juicy Hotdogs 113, Diet Sarsi Sizzlers 133

The ULTRA, Pasig

Vintage

May 7

Purefoods Tender Juicy Hotdogs 124, Diet Sarsi Sizzlers 147

The ULTRA, Pasig

Vintage

May 9

Purefoods Tender Juicy Hotdogs 122, Diet Sarsi Sizzlers 131
Diet Sarsi wins series, 3–0

The ULTRA, Pasig

== Finals ==
Vintage

May 5

Ginebra San Miguel 109, Shell Rimula X 114

The ULTRA, Pasig

Vintage

May 7

Ginebra San Miguel 125, Shell Rimula X 114 (OT)

The ULTRA, Pasig

Vintage

May 9

Ginebra San Miguel 113, Shell Rimula X 120

The ULTRA, Pasig

Vintage

May 12

Ginebra San Miguel 125, Shell Rimula X 127 (OT)

The ULTRA, Pasig

Vintage

May 14

Ginebra San Miguel 116, Shell Rimula X 90

The ULTRA, Pasig

Vintage

May 16

Ginebra San Miguel 123, Shell Rimula X 119

The ULTRA, Pasig

Vintage

May 19

Ginebra San Miguel 104, Shell Rimula X 102
Ginebra wins series, 4–3

The ULTRA, Pasig
