= 1991 PBA Third Conference =

Philippines basketball tournament

- Duration: September 15 – December 15, 1991
- TV partner(s): Vintage Sports (PTV)

Finals
- Champions: Alaska Milkmen
- Runners-up: Ginebra San Miguel

Awards
- Best Import: Wes Matthews (Ginebra San Miguel)

PBA Third Conference chronology
- < 1990 1992 >

PBA conference chronology
- < 1991 All-Filipino 1992 First >

The 1991 Philippine Basketball Association (PBA) Third Conference was the last conference of the 1991 PBA season. It started on September 15 and ended on December 15, 1991. The tournament allows one import with a height limit of 6'1" each per team.

== Format ==
The following format will be observed for the duration of the conference:

- The teams were divided into 2 groups.

Group A:

1. Ginebra San Miguel
2. Pepsi Hotshots
3. Tivoli Milkmasters
4. San Miguel Beermen

Group B:

1. Alaska Milkmen
2. Shell Rimula X
3. Purefoods TJ Hotdogs
4. Swift Mighty Meaty Hotdogs

- Teams in a group will play against each other once and against teams in the other group twice; 11 games per team; Teams are then seeded on the basis on win–loss records. Ties are broken among point differentials of the tied teams. Standings will be determined in one league table; teams do not qualify based on groupings.
- The top five teams after the eliminations will advance to the semifinals.
- The Semifinals will be two round-robin affairs with the remaining five teams. Results from the eliminations will be carried over. A playoff incentive for a finals berth will be given to the team that will win at least five of their eight semifinal games.
- The top two teams in the semifinals advance to the best of five finals. The next two teams dispute the third-place trophy in a best-of-three playoff.

== Elimination round ==
=== Team standings ===
Pos	Team	W	L	PCT	GB	Qualification
1	Pepsi Hotshots	8	3	.727	—	Semifinal round
2	Alaska Milkmen	7	4	.636	1	Semifinal round
3	Ginebra San Miguel	7	4	.636	1	Semifinal round
4	San Miguel Beermen	6	5	.545	2	Semifinal round
5	Tivoli Milkmasters	6	5	.545	2	Semifinal round
6	Shell Rimula X	4	7	.364	4	
7	Swify Mighty Meaty Hotdogs	4	7	.364	4	
8	Purefoods Tender Juicy Hotdogs	2	9	.182	6	

== Semifinal round ==
=== Team standings ===
Overall standings
Pos	Team	W	L	PCT	GB	Qualification
1	Alaska Milkmen	12	7	.632 (Note: Head-to-head record: Alaska 2–1 Ginebra)	—	Advance to the Finals
2	Ginebra San Miguel	12	7	.632	—	Advance to the Finals
3	Pepsi Hotshots	11	8	.579	1	Proceed to third place playoffs
4	San Miguel Beermen	10	9	.526	2	Proceed to third place playoffs
5	Tivoli Milkmasters	9	10	.474	3	

Notes:

Semifinal round standings
Pos	Team	W	L
1	Alaska Milkmen	5	3
2	Ginebra San Miguel	5	3
3	San Miguel Beermen	4	4
4	Pepsi Hotshots	3	5
5	Tivoli Milkmasters	3	5

== Third place playoffs ==
Vintage

December 8

Pepsi Hotshots 116, San Miguel Beermen 119

The ULTRA, Pasig

Vintage

December 10

Pepsi Hotshots 109, San Miguel Beermen 105

The ULTRA, Pasig

Vintage

December 12

Pepsi Hotshots 109, San Miguel Beermen 114
San Miguel wins series, 2–1

The ULTRA, Pasig

== Finals ==
Vintage

December 8

Alaska Milkmen 93, Ginebra San Miguel 92

The ULTRA, Pasig

Vintage

December 10

Alaska Milkmen 105, Ginebra San Miguel 107

The ULTRA, Pasig

Vintage

December 12

Alaska Milkmen 122, Ginebra San Miguel 103

The ULTRA, Pasig

Vintage

December 15

Alaska Milkmen 99, Ginebra San Miguel 90
Alaska wins series, 3–1

The ULTRA, Pasig
