= List of Philippine Basketball Association conferences =

This is a list of Philippine Basketball Association (PBA) conferences. Conferences are tournaments within a season, as opposed to the North American usage where a conference is a grouping of teams. If a team wins all of the conferences in a season, it is said that they have won a Grand Slam.

== Types of conferences ==
As of the 2024–25 season, there is a total of 137 conferences/tournaments held by the PBA since 1975. It was further broken down into three categories:

- All Filipino conferences - only players with Filipino citizenship are allowed to compete. (46 tournaments as of 2024–25 season)
- Import-laden conferences - players with other citizenship/nationality are allowed to compete, with teams usually limited with one non-Filipino on their active lineup. (91 tournaments as of 2024–25 season)
- Special tournaments - teams may or may not include imports but championships won don't count to the championship tally.

=== Active tournaments ===
- All-Filipino Conference/All-Filipino Cup/Philippine Cup - San Miguel Beermen
- Commissioner's Cup - TNT Tropang Giga
- Governors' Cup - TNT Tropang Giga

=== Inactive tournaments ===
- All-Philippine Championship - Crispa Redmanizers (1976)
- Reinforced Filipino - Crispa Redmanizers (1983)
- Fiesta - Alaska Aces (2010)
- Open - San Miguel Beermen (1989)
- Reinforced - Coca-Cola Tigers (2003)
- First Conference - Shell Rimula X (1992)
- Third Conference - Swift Mighty Meaties (1992)
- Invitational - Alaska Aces (2003)

=== Special tournaments ===
- PBA-IBA- Añejo Rum 65ers (1988)
- Centennial - Mobiline Phone Pals (1998)

== Number of conferences ==
There had always been three conferences in a PBA season. The exceptions are:

- 1981 PBA season had two conferences due to Manila's hosting of the 1981 Southeast Asian Games.
- 1998 PBA season had four conferences due to the celebration of the centennial of the Philippine Declaration of Independence.
- There were two conferences from 2004 to 2010 due to modification of the season format from three conferences to two, and from changing the season calendar from January or February–December to October–July. To do this, there was a transitional 2004 PBA Fiesta Conference. The association reverted to three conferences for the 2010–11 PBA season.
- 2020 PBA season had one conference due to the COVID-19 pandemic in the Philippines.
- 2021 PBA season had two conferences due to the COVID-19 pandemic in the Philippines.
- 2023–24 PBA season had two conferences due to the Philippines' hosting of the 2023 FIBA Basketball World Cup and the 19th Asian Games in China in 2023.

== List of conferences ==
=== 1970s ===
- 1975 PBA season
  - 1975 PBA First Conference (Note: The first and second conferences of the 1975 and 1976 seasons were officially named as All-Filipino Conference and Open Conference respectively. The All-Filipino Conference was reclassified in the 2010s as an import-laced tournament since the league gave teams the option to hire foreign players or "imports". Both tournaments were renamed as First and Second Conference since the 2001 edition of Hardcourt, the official PBA Annual.)
  - 1975 PBA Second Conference
  - 1975 PBA All-Philippine Championship
- 1976 PBA season
  - 1976 PBA First Conference
  - 1976 PBA Second Conference
  - 1976 PBA All-Philippine Championship
- 1977 PBA season
  - 1977 PBA All-Filipino Conference
  - 1977 PBA Open Conference
  - 1977 PBA Invitational championship
- 1978 PBA season
  - 1978 PBA All-Filipino Conference
  - 1978 PBA Open Conference
  - 1978 PBA Invitational championship
- 1979 PBA season
  - 1979 PBA All-Filipino Conference
  - 1979 PBA Open Conference
  - 1979 PBA Invitational championship

=== 1980s ===
- 1980 PBA season
  - 1980 PBA Open Conference
  - 1980 PBA Invitational championship
  - 1980 PBA All-Filipino Conference
- 1981 PBA season
  - 1981 PBA Open Conference
  - 1981 PBA Reinforced Filipino Conference
- 1982 PBA season
  - 1982 PBA Reinforced Filipino Conference
  - 1982 PBA Invitational championship
  - 1982 PBA Open Conference
- 1983 PBA season
  - 1983 PBA All-Filipino Conference
  - 1983 PBA Reinforced Filipino Conference
  - 1983 PBA Open Conference
- 1984 PBA season
  - 1984 PBA First All-Filipino Conference
  - 1984 PBA Second All-Filipino Conference
  - 1984 PBA Invitational championship
- 1985 PBA season
  - 1985 PBA Open Conference
  - 1985 PBA All-Filipino Conference
  - 1985 PBA Reinforced Conference
- 1986 PBA season
  - 1986 PBA Reinforced Conference
  - 1986 PBA All-Filipino Conference
  - 1986 PBA Open Conference
- 1987 PBA season
  - 1987 PBA Open Conference
  - 1987 PBA All-Filipino Conference
  - 1987 PBA Reinforced Conference
- 1988 PBA season
  - 1988 PBA Open Conference
  - 1988 PBA All-Filipino Conference
  - 1988 PBA Reinforced Conference
- 1989 PBA season
  - 1989 PBA Open Conference
  - 1989 PBA All-Filipino Conference
  - 1989 PBA Reinforced Conference

=== 1990s ===
- 1990 PBA season
  - 1990 PBA First Conference
  - 1990 PBA All-Filipino Conference
  - 1990 PBA Third Conference
- 1991 PBA season
  - 1991 PBA First Conference
  - 1991 PBA All-Filipino Conference
  - 1991 PBA Third Conference
- 1992 PBA season
  - 1992 PBA First Conference
  - 1992 PBA All-Filipino Conference
  - 1992 PBA Third Conference
- 1993 PBA season
  - 1993 PBA All-Filipino Cup
  - 1993 PBA Commissioner's Cup
  - 1993 PBA Governors' Cup
- 1994 PBA season
  - 1994 PBA All-Filipino Cup
  - 1994 PBA Commissioner's Cup
  - 1994 PBA Governors' Cup
- 1995 PBA season
  - 1995 PBA All-Filipino Cup
  - 1995 PBA Commissioner's Cup
  - 1995 PBA Governors' Cup
- 1996 PBA season
  - 1996 PBA All-Filipino Cup
  - 1996 PBA Commissioner's Cup
  - 1996 PBA Governors' Cup
- 1997 PBA season
  - 1997 PBA All-Filipino Cup
  - 1997 PBA Commissioner's Cup
  - 1997 PBA Governors' Cup
- 1998 PBA season
  - 1998 PBA All-Filipino Cup
  - 1998 PBA Commissioner's Cup
  - 1998 PBA Centennial Cup
  - 1998 PBA Governors' Cup
- 1999 PBA season
  - 1999 PBA All-Filipino Cup
  - 1999 PBA Commissioner's Cup
  - 1999 PBA Governors' Cup

=== 2000s ===
- 2000 PBA season
  - 2000 PBA All-Filipino Cup
  - 2000 PBA Commissioner's Cup
  - 2000 PBA Governors' Cup
- 2001 PBA season
  - 2001 PBA All-Filipino Cup
  - 2001 PBA Commissioner's Cup
  - 2001 PBA Governors' Cup
- 2002 PBA season
  - 2002 PBA Governors' Cup
  - 2002 PBA Commissioner's Cup
  - 2002 PBA All-Filipino Cup
- 2003 PBA season
  - 2003 PBA All-Filipino Cup
  - 2003 PBA Invitational Cup
  - 2003 PBA Reinforced Conference
- 2004 PBA Fiesta Conference
- 2004–05 PBA season
  - 2004–05 PBA Philippine Cup
  - 2005 PBA Fiesta Conference
- 2005–06 PBA season
  - 2005–06 PBA Fiesta Conference
  - 2006 PBA Philippine Cup
- 2006–07 PBA season
  - 2006–07 PBA Philippine Cup
  - 2007 PBA Fiesta Conference
- 2007–08 PBA season
  - 2007–08 PBA Philippine Cup
  - 2008 PBA Fiesta Conference
- 2008–09 PBA season
  - 2008–09 PBA Philippine Cup
  - 2009 PBA Fiesta Conference

=== 2010s ===
- 2009–10 PBA season
  - 2009–10 PBA Philippine Cup
  - 2010 PBA Fiesta Conference
- 2010–11 PBA season
  - 2010–11 PBA Philippine Cup
  - 2011 PBA Commissioner's Cup
  - 2011 PBA Governors' Cup
- 2011–12 PBA season
  - 2011–12 PBA Philippine Cup
  - 2012 PBA Commissioner's Cup
  - 2012 PBA Governors' Cup
- 2012–13 PBA season
  - 2012–13 PBA Philippine Cup
  - 2013 PBA Commissioner's Cup
  - 2013 PBA Governors' Cup
- 2013–14 PBA season
  - 2013–14 PBA Philippine Cup
  - 2014 PBA Commissioner's Cup
  - 2014 PBA Governors' Cup
- 2014–15 PBA season
  - 2014–15 PBA Philippine Cup
  - 2015 PBA Commissioner's Cup
  - 2015 PBA Governors' Cup
- 2015–16 PBA season
  - 2015–16 PBA Philippine Cup
  - 2016 PBA Commissioner's Cup
  - 2016 PBA Governors' Cup
- 2016–17 PBA season
  - 2016–17 PBA Philippine Cup
  - 2017 PBA Commissioner's Cup
  - 2017 PBA Governors' Cup
- 2017–18 PBA season
  - 2017–18 PBA Philippine Cup
  - 2018 PBA Commissioner's Cup
  - 2018 PBA Governors' Cup
- 2019 PBA season
  - 2019 PBA Philippine Cup
  - 2019 PBA Commissioner's Cup
  - 2019 PBA Governors' Cup

=== 2020s ===
- 2020 PBA season
  - 2020 PBA Philippine Cup
- 2021 PBA season
  - 2021 PBA Philippine Cup
  - 2021 PBA Governors' Cup
- 2022–23 PBA season
  - 2022 PBA Philippine Cup
  - 2022–23 PBA Commissioner's Cup
  - 2023 PBA Governors' Cup
- 2023–24 PBA season
  - 2023–24 PBA Commissioner's Cup
  - 2024 PBA Philippine Cup
- 2024–25 PBA season
  - 2024 PBA Governors' Cup
  - 2024–25 PBA Commissioner's Cup
  - 2025 PBA Philippine Cup
