= PBA Third Conference =

Tournament information
- Location: varies per season
- Month played: varies per played
- Established: 1990
- Final year: 1992
- Format: See tournament format

Final champion
- Swift Mighty Meaty Hotdogs (1st title)

The PBA Third Conference was a tournament of the Philippine Basketball Association (PBA) from 1990 to 1992. These conferences often featured one or two foreign players, also known as "imports", for each competing team

== History ==
The first third conference began on September 30, 1990, with each team featuring two imports. This would be the only Third Conference with two imports. It saw the Purefoods Hotdogs coming back from a 0–2 deficit in the finals against the Alaska Aces to win their first title.

During the 1991 Third Conference, Allan Caidic scored 79 points in a win Barangay Ginebra, the most by a Filipino basketball player in league history. Ginebra also lost to Alaska in the finals, 1–3.

The 1992 Third Conference was a memorable one, as it saw Swift import Tony Harris score a PBA-record 105 points in a win over Ginebra on October 10, 1992. In the finals, Swift faced the 7-Up Bottlers, making this the first time two expansion teams faced each other in the PBA finals. Swift went on to sweep the finals.

== PBA Third Conference results ==
Season	Champion	Runner-up	Series	Details
1990	Purefoods	Alaska	3–2	Details
1991	Alaska	Ginebra	3–1	Details
1992	Swift	7-Up	4–0	Details

== Best Import of the Conference ==
Season	Best import (Team)
1990	(United States) Bobby Parks (Shell)
1991	(United States) Wes Matthews (Ginebra)
1992	(United States) Tony Harris (Swift)
