= Athletic conference =

Collection of sports teams

The logo of the Atlantic 10 Conference, a collegiate athletic conference

An athletic conference is a collection of sports teams which play competitively against each other in a sports league. In many cases conferences are subdivided into smaller divisions, with the best teams competing at successively higher levels. Conferences often, but not always, include teams from a common geographic region.

== Australian rules football ==
The AFL Women's competition used a non-geographic conference system in 2019 and 2020. The league was divided into two conferences, based on ladder position in the previous season. Not every team could play each other due to the limited number of rounds, so conferences were introduced so that teams were only measured against the teams they played. The system was controversial because it allowed some weak teams to make finals, and strong teams from the other conference missed out on finals. It was because of this that the conference system was removed for the 2021 season.

== United States and Canada ==
=== Professional sports ===
In the United States and Canada, the National Hockey League (NHL) and National Basketball Association (NBA) are divided into Eastern (NHL, NBA) and Western (NHL, NBA) Conferences, with multiple divisions within each conference (two in each NHL conference, three in each NBA conference). In both leagues, a total of sixteen teams (eight from each conference) qualify for the league's postseason playoffs. In the NHL, since the 2013–14 season, the top 3 in each division are guaranteed to qualify and division winners are awarded the highest seeds, meaning they will have home-ice advantage in a given round, with the two best remaining teams in each conference receiving wild card spots. In the NBA, starting with the 2015–16 season, the playoff spots go to the eight top teams in each conference by overall record, with home-court advantage in each playoff series based solely on record. Major League Soccer (MLS) also divides itself into an Eastern and Western Conference, though it does not have divisions within them; it too allocates an equal number of teams from each conference to play for its MLS Cup Playoffs (since 2019, this has been seven teams each).

The National Football League (NFL) is divided into an American Football Conference (AFC) and a National Football Conference (NFC). Both conferences have 16 teams, and each conference is divided into 4 divisions of 4 teams each. These conferences, for the most part, derive from the fact that they were once separate organizations: the original National Football League and the 1960s American Football League; the two entities merged in 1970, with each league forming the basis of the NFC and AFC respectively. The NFL allocates seven teams from each conference for the NFL playoffs; the four division winners (guaranteed one of the top four seeds, based on winning percentage), and the three best-non division winners, also known as wild cards.

Major League Baseball (MLB) does not use the word "conference." Instead, it is divided into two separate leagues which are identical to the conferences listed above in all but name (which, although their operations have been integrated via the Commissioner of Baseball in modern times, were originally separately managed organizations with an intense rivalry). These are the American League (AL) and National League (NL), with 15 teams each. Each league is divided into the Eastern (AL, NL), Central (AL, NL), and Western (AL, NL) divisions, with all six divisions having 5 teams each. Each league produces six teams for postseason play, with each division winner also guaranteed one of the top three seeds, even if their record is lower than the league's top wild card teams.

In all five sports, the champion of one conference (or league in MLB's case) plays the champion of the other conference for the final round championship, this is guaranteed to occur because the rules for the playoffs require play to be exclusively within the conference/league in all rounds before the final round, leaving only two teams for the finals (one from each conference/league) and the records of teams outside a conference/league are ignored, which can allow teams with inferior records to make the playoffs while teams in the other conference with better records do not get in. An extreme example of this has occurred five times in the NFL, when the 2010 Seattle Seahawks, 2014 Carolina Panthers, 2020 Washington Football Team, 2022 Tampa Bay Buccaneers and 2025 Carolina Panthers reached the playoffs by winning their respective divisions despite losing records (7–9 for the Seahawks and Washington, 7–8–1 for the 2014 Panthers, 8–9 for the Buccaneers and 2025 Panthers). These are the only teams ever to qualify for the playoffs with losing records in seasons that were not shortened by strikes (as in 1982, which was shortened from 16 to 9 games). In addition, a team's regular season schedule is weighted towards more games against other teams within their own division and to a lesser extent their own conference; NBA and NHL teams play at least two games (one at each home arena) against every other team in their league in a regular season, MLB teams play at least one 3-game series against every other team (as of the 2023 season), but the NFL teams do not.

=== Collegiate sports ===
In college sports, the terms "league," "conference" and (generally at lower levels) "athletic association" can be used interchangeably to refer to a group of teams (generally eight to twelve colleges or universities, and occasionally as high as eighteen) that regularly play against each other within a national governing body, the most significant of which is the National Collegiate Athletic Association (NCAA). Most of these groups (including the "Power Four" conferences that are primary partners in the College Football Playoff) refer to themselves as conferences, although the Horizon League, Ivy League, Patriot League, Pioneer League and Summit League use the word "league" instead, and another conference calls itself the Coastal Athletic Association. The NCAA itself is divided into divisions and subdivisions based on athletic scholarship eligibility, which can lead to redundancy when these conferences also have divisions of their own.

== England and Wales ==
In English association football, the top level of non-League football—i.e., the level below the Premier League and the three tiers that make up the English Football League (EFL)—was known as the Football Conference from the 1986–87 season through the end of the 2014–15 season. In turn, from 2004, the Conference was divided into three leagues—Conference Premier, at the fifth tier of the English football pyramid, and Conference North and Conference South, which made up the sixth tier. Starting with the 2015–16 season, the Football Conference and its component leagues were renamed. The Football Conference and Conference Premier were both renamed "National League", and the two regional leagues were renamed National League North and National League South.

This does not strictly meet the definition indicated in the previous sections of this article, as each individual league mentioned in this section is a separate competition. The only times that teams from different leagues compete against one another in meaningful matches are in knockout cup competitions, such as the FA Cup (open to teams from all levels), the EFL Cup (open only to teams from the Premier League and the English Football League), and the FA Trophy (open only to teams in the broader definition of the National League, plus the two tiers below it).

== Russia ==
The Kontinental Hockey League has a Western Conference and an Eastern Conference. This is similar to the NHL's conferences in North America.

== Rugby union ==
=== Super Rugby ===
In rugby union, Super Rugby is the highest level of provincial competition in Australia, New Zealand and South Africa, the highest domestic level in Japan, and the only professional domestic level in Argentina. From the creation of Super Rugby in 1996 through 2015, only Australia, New Zealand and South Africa participated; the competition added teams in the latter two countries in 2016. Since the 2011 season, it has operated on a conference system.

From 2011 through to 2015, the competition had one conference based in each of its three founding countries. The winner of each conference received a playoff spot, as did the three next best teams overall. With the addition of Argentina's Jaguares and Japan's Sunwolves for 2016, plus a sixth franchise for South Africa, the competition reorganised into a new four-conference system. In 2016 and 2017, Australia and New Zealand formed separate conferences within an Australasian group; the South African teams were joined by the Jaguares and Sunwolves in a "South African" group, with that group also being divided into two conferences. The winner of each conference continued to receive a playoff spot, with additional berths going to the next three best Australasian teams and the next best team of the South African group.

For 2018, Super Rugby will revert to a 15-team format, following the dropping of two teams from South Africa and one from Australia. The new format features three conferences—Australia, New Zealand and South Africa, each with five teams; the Sunwolves will join the Australian conference and the Jaguares will play in the South African conference. The conference winners will continue to receive playoff berths, with additional berths going to the top five teams in the overall competition table that were not already qualified.

=== United Rugby Championship ===
In the same sport, Pro14, now known as the United Rugby Championship, adopted a conference system effective in 2017–18, following the addition of the two South African teams dropped from Super Rugby. The competition split into two conferences, each featuring two teams from Ireland and Wales, plus single teams from Italy, Scotland and South Africa. Following the league season, the teams that top each conference table received berths in the semifinals, with the next two teams in each conference playing off for semifinal berths.

After the 2020–21 season, South Africa fully aligned its club rugby structure with that of Europe. The then-existing Pro14 franchises from South Africa were replaced by the country's four Super Rugby franchises, which moved into Pro14 and led to the competition's rebranding as the United Rugby Championship. For the first season under the URC name in 2021–22, the competition reorganized into four regionally based pools, though no longer using the word "conference". Three of the pools are made up of teams from one country—Ireland, South Africa, and Wales. The fourth features the teams from Italy and Scotland. Each regional pool competes for a secondary trophy called a "shield" (Irish, Scottish/Italian, South African, Welsh), with the overall league table used to determine playoff participants. The winner of each shield, however, is assured a place in the following year's European Rugby Champions Cup regardless of its overall league position.

== Philippines ==
The now defunct Manila Industrial and Commercial Athletic Association, where teams are represented by companies instead of geographical entities, and there are multiple tournaments held sequentially in a season, a conference refers to a single tournament. This has since been carried over by other leagues, such as the Philippine Basketball Association (PBA), which has its own conferences, the Philippine Super Liga, the Premier Volleyball League, the PBA D-League, and formerly the Philippine Basketball League.

The term "conference" referring to a single tournament does not apply if there's only one tournament in a season, such as in the case of the college sports leagues, the Philippine Football League, and the Maharlika Pilipinas Basketball League.

== See also ==
- Division (sport)
- List of college athletic conferences in the United States
- Outline of sports
- Regulation of sport
- Sports league
