= 1991 San Miguel Beermen season =

- Head coach: Norman Black
- General Manager: Eddie Veneracion
- Owner(s): San Miguel Corporation

First Conference results
- Record: 9–10 (47.4%)
- Place: 5th
- Playoff finish: Semifinals

All-Filipino Conference results
- Record: 12–11 (52.2%)
- Place: 4th
- Playoff finish: Semifinals

Third Conference results
- Record: 12–10 (54.5%)
- Place: 3rd
- Playoff finish: Semifinals

San Miguel Beermen seasons

The 1991 San Miguel Beermen season was the 17th season of the franchise in the Philippine Basketball Association (PBA).

== Draft pick ==
Round	Pick	Player	Details
1	4	Arthur dela Cruz	Signed

== Notable dates ==
March 19: Import Ricky Wilson, who also came in last season's third conference as a replacement, torched the hoops with 57 points as San Miguel snapped the Ginebras' two-game winning run with a 112-109 victory. The Beermen improved to four wins and three losses while Ginebra dropped to three victories against four defeats.

July 2: San Miguel Beermen pull off an easy 102-91 triumph over Alaska that sent them two games closer to a semifinal seat in the All-Filipino Conference.

September 22: Import Andrew Moten scored 69 points and hitting 12 triples to lead the Beermen to their second victory in the Third Conference, a 125-123 win over Shell on Ato Agustin's last-second basket.

October 13: Ato Agustin's jumper with a second remaining lift San Miguel to a 126-124 win over Swift as the Beermen tied the Mighty Meaties in the standings with an even four wins and four losses. New Import Larry Robbins topscored for the Beermen with 54 points.

October 27: San Miguel avoided playoff complications and booked the fourth semifinals seat of the Third Conference with their sixth win in 11 games on a hassle-free 138-132 victory over also-ran Purefoods Tender Juicy Hotdogs.

November 10: Jay Taylor, the fourth Beermen import to arrived, sizzled with 72 points in leading San Miguel to a 141-128 win over Tivoli Milk at the close of the first round of the semifinals. The Beermen moved two games ahead of the Milkmasters with their eight victory in 15 games.

== Occurrences ==
In San Miguel's third outing in the Third Conference against Alaska, Import Andrew Moten blew his top on the physical defense put up by the Milkmen over him and deserted his team during the halftime break, he later return to finish the game. Moten's emotional outburst resulted to the Beermen's 92-111 loss to Alaska. Moten lambasted league officials and was immediately sent home by San Miguel management to protect their image, he was promptly banned by the PBA thereafter.

== Roster ==
1991 San Miguel Beermen roster
Players

Pos.	#	POB	Name	Height	Weight	DOB (YYYY–MM–DD)	From
G	5	(Philippines)	Franz Pumaren	5 ft 9 in (1.75 m)			De La Salle
G	6	(Philippines)	Ato Agustin	5 ft 11 in (1.80 m)			Lyceum
F	8	(Philippines)	Bobby Jose	6 ft 3 in (1.91 m)			UST
F/C	10	(Philippines)	Alvin Teng	6 ft 4 in (1.93 m)			Arellano
C	11	(Philippines)	Joseph Pelaez	6 ft 5 in (1.96 m)			Manila
F/C	12	(Philippines)	Yves Dignadice	6 ft 4 in (1.93 m)			STI WNU
G	14	(Philippines)	Hector Calma	5 ft 9 in (1.75 m)			Adamson
F	15 & 18	(Philippines)	Art Dela Cruz	6 ft 2 in (1.88 m)			San Sebastian
G/F	16	(Philippines)	Romeo Lopez	6 ft 0 in (1.83 m)			Angeles
F	17	(Philippines)	Jeffrey Graves	6 ft 3 in (1.91 m)			Angeles
C	19	(Philippines)	Ramon Fernandez	6 ft 4 in (1.93 m)			San Carlos
F	22	(Philippines)	Edgardo Postanes	6 ft 1 in (1.85 m)			Far Eastern
F	29	(Philippines)	Josel Angeles	6 ft 3 in (1.91 m)			Lyceum

Coaches

Head coach

- (United States) Norman Black

Assistant coach(es)

- (Philippines) Filomeno Pumaren

Team manager

- (Philippines) Eddie Veneracion

Legend

- (C) Team captain
- Injured

== Transactions ==
=== Additions ===
Player	Signed	Former team
Jeffrey Graves	Off-season	Pepsi
Joseph Pelaez	June 1991	Pop-Cola

=== Rookie free agents ===
Player	Signed	Former team
Romeo Lopez	June 1991	N/A

=== Recruited imports ===
Name	Conference	No.	Pos.	Ht.	College	Duration
Eric Brown	First Conference	32	Center-Forward	6"4'	University of Miami	February 17 to March 3
Ricky Wilson	First Conference	16	Center-Forward	6"3'	George Mason University	March 7 to May 2
Andrew Moten	Third Conference	1	Guard	5"11'	University of Florida	September 17–24
John Taft	Third Conference	23	Forward-Guard	6"1'	Marshall University	September 29 to October 5
Larry Robbins	Third Conference	24	Forward-Guard	6"1'	Kent State University	October 13–31
Jay Taylor	Third Conference	24	Forward-Guard	6"1'	Eastern Illinois University	November 3 to December 12
