= 1991 PBA season =

17th PBA season

- Duration: February 17 – December 15, 1991
- Teams: 8
- TV partner: Vintage Sports (PTV)

1991 PBA Draft
- Top draft pick: Alejandro Araneta
- Picked by: Alaska Milkmen
- Season MVP: Alvin Patrimonio (Purefoods TJ Hotdogs)
- First Conference champions: Ginebra San Miguel
- First Conference runners-up: Shell Rimula X
- All-Filipino Conference champions: Purefoods TJ Hotdogs
- All-Filipino Conference runners-up: Diet Sarsi Sizzlers
- Third Conference champions: Alaska Milkmen
- Third Conference runners-up: Ginebra San Miguel

Seasons
- ← 1990 1992 →

The 1991 PBA season was the 17th season of the Philippine Basketball Association (PBA).

== Board of governors ==
=== Executive committee ===
- Rodrigo L. Salud (Commissioner)
- Luis Lorenzo, Sr. (Chairman, representing Pepsi Hotshots)
- Wilfred Steven Uytengsu (Vice Chairman, representing Alaska Milkmen)
- Lance Gokongwei (Treasurer, representing Presto Tivolis)

=== Teams ===
Team	Company	Governor
Alaska Milkmen	General Milling Corporation	Wilfred Steven Uytengsu
Ginebra San Miguel	La Tondeña Distillers, Inc.	Carlos Palanca III
Pepsi Hotshots	Pepsi-Cola Products Philippines, Inc.	Luis Lorenzo, Sr.
Diet Sarsi	Republic Flour Mills Corporation	Elmer Yanga
Presto Tivolis	Consolidated Foods Corporation	Lance Gokongwei
Purefoods Hotdogs	Purefoods Corporation	Renato Buhain
San Miguel Beermen	San Miguel Corporation	Nazario Avendaño
Shell Rimula X	Pilipinas Shell Petroleum Corporation	Ric Lara

== Season highlights ==
- The PBA Rookie draft was aired on TV live for the first time in league history.
- A PBA-China exhibition series took place during the pre-season from January 27 – February 3. The three PBA champions last year played the Liaoning basketball team which boast of three Beijing Asian Games veterans in a four-game series. Presto and Shell won over Liaoning but the Chinese cagers prevail against Purefoods in their third outing. Finally, a PBA All-Star selection won over Liaoning in their final assignment.
- Vintage sports commentator Joe Cantada covered his final game on TV during the April 9 replay of the controversial Shell-Purefoods game that took place on March 17.
- An era in Philippine Basketball ended on April 21 when Virgilio "Baby" Dalupan resigned as head coach of Purefoods Hotdogs. Dalupan cited his difference with management as the reason for his resignation.
- On May 19, Ginebra San Miguel made history in the PBA record books as the first team to come back from a 1–3 series deficit and beat Shell Rimula-X in game 7 of the best-of-seven 1st conference championship showdown. Rudy Distrito made a difficult baseline fadeaway shot against two Shell defenders with one second remaining to give Ginebra their third PBA title.
- After the contract of Alvin Patrimonio with Purefoods expired in June, Pepsi Hotshots offered Patrimonio a P 25.3 million salary and a benefits package for 5 1/2 years, Purefoods matched Pepsi's multi-million peso contract to retain Patrimonio's services.
- Due to numerous players requesting megabuck deals, the league initiated a "salary cap" starting the 1992 season. Swift, Shell, Alaska, Tivoli, Pepsi and Ginebra will have a P12 million cap while Purefoods and San Miguel will have a cap of P15 million.
- Alvin Patrimonio of Purefoods won the season's Most Valuable Player award. The PBA Awards Night took place on December 19 at the ULTRA and it was billed as "Pasasalamat".
- By the end of the season, Rudy Salud resigned as the commissioner of the league.

== Opening ceremonies ==
The muses for the participating teams are as follows:

Team	Muse
Alaska Milkmen	Christine Jacob
Diet Sarsi Sizzlers	Gretchen Barretto
Ginebra San Miguel	Shireen Ledesma
Pepsi Hotshots	Emily Artadi
Presto Tivolis	Carmi Matic and Jane Ashley
Purefoods Hotdogs	Sofia Zobel
San Miguel Beermen	Nanette Medved
Shell Rimula X	Jennifer Pingree and Maricel Laxa

== Champions ==
- First Conference: Ginebra San Miguel
- All-Filipino Conference: Purefoods Tender Juicy Hotdogs
- Third Conference: Alaska Milkmen
- Team with best win–loss percentage: Alaska Milkmen (31–25, .554)
- Best Team of the Year: Ginebra San Miguel (1st)

== First Conference ==
=== Elimination round ===
Pos	Team	W	L	PCT	GB	Qualification
1	Shell Rimula X	8	3	.727	—	Semifinal round
2	San Miguel Beermen	7	4	.636	1	Semifinal round
3	Purefoods Tender Juicy Hotdogs	6	5	.545	2	Semifinal round
4	Diet Sarsi Sizzlers	6	5	.545	2	Semifinal round
5	Ginebra San Miguel	5	6	.455	3	Semifinal round
6	Presto Tivolis	4	7	.364	4	
7	Alaska Milkmen	4	7	.364	4	
8	Pepsi Hotshots	4	7	.364	4	

=== Semifinal round ===
Overall standings
Pos	Team	W	L	PCT	GB	Qualification
1	Shell Rimula X	12	7	.632 (Note: Head-to-head record: Shell 3–1 Ginebra)	—	Advance to the finals
2	Ginebra San Miguel	12	7	.632	—	Advance to the finals
3	Purefoods Tender Juicy Hotdogs	10	9	.526	2	Proceed to third place playoffs
4	Diet Sarsi Sizzlers	9	10	.474 (Note: Head-to-head record: Diet Sarsi 3–1 San Miguel)	3	Proceed to third place playoffs
5	San Miguel Beermen	9	10	.474	3	

Notes:

Semifinal round standings
Pos	Team	W	L
1	Ginebra San Miguel	7	1
2	Shell Rimula X	4	4
3	Purefoods Tender Juicy Hotdogs	4	4
4	Diet Sarsi Sizzlers	3	5
5	San Miguel Beermen	2	6

=== Third place playoffs ===
Team 1	Series	Team 2	Game 1	Game 2	Game 3	Game 4	Game 5
(3) Purefoods Tender Juicy Hotdogs	0–3	(4) Diet Sarsi Sizzlers	113–133	124–147	122–131	—	—

=== Finals ===
Team 1	Series	Team 2	Game 1	Game 2	Game 3	Game 4	Game 5	Game 6	Game 7
(1) Shell Rimula X	3–4	(2) Ginebra San Miguel	114–109	114–125 (OT)	120–113	127–125 (OT)	90–116	119–123	102–104

- Best Import of the Conference: Bobby Parks (Shell)

== All-Filipino Conference ==
=== Elimination round ===
Pos	Team	W	L	PCT	GB	Qualification
1	Diet Sarsi Sizzlers	8	3	.727	—	Semifinal round
2	Purefoods Tender Juicy Hotdogs	7	4	.636	1	Semifinal round
3	San Miguel Beermen	6	5	.545	2	Semifinal round
4	Tivoli Milkmasters	6	5	.545	2	Semifinal round
5	Alaska Milkmen	6	5	.545	2	Semifinal round
6	Ginebra San Miguel	4	7	.364	4	
7	Shell Rimula X	4	7	.364	4	
8	Pepsi Hotshots	3	8	.273	5	

=== Semifinal round ===
Overall standings
Pos	Team	W	L	PCT	GB	Qualification
1	Purefoods Tender Juicy Hotdogs	12	7	.632 (Note: Head-to-head differential: Purefoods +2, Diet Sarsi −2)	—	Advance to the finals (Note: If a team outside the top two teams wins at least five semifinal round games, then it and the second-placed team will playoff for the last finals berth; otherwise, the top 2 teams qualify outright.)
2	Diet Sarsi Sizzlers	12	7	.632	—	Guaranteed finals berth playoff
3	San Miguel Beermen	11	8	.579	1	Qualify to finals berth playoff
4	Alaska Milkmen	10	9	.526	2	Proceed to third place playoffs
5	Tivoli Milkmasters	8	11	.421	4	

Notes:

Semifinal round standings
Pos	Team	W	L	Qualification
1	San Miguel Beermen	5	3	Qualify to finals berth playoff (Note: Purefoods advanced to the finals outright as #1 seeded team; finals berth playoff: Diet Sarsi 100–95 San Miguel)
2	Purefoods Tender Juicy Hotdogs	5	3	
3	Alaska Milkmen	4	4	
4	Diet Sarsi Sizzlers	4	4	
5	Tivoli Milkmasters	2	6	

=== Third place playoffs ===
Team 1	Series	Team 2	Game 1	Game 2	Game 3
(3) San Miguel Beermen	1–2	(4) Alaska Milkmen	99–101	106–96	93–108

=== Finals ===
Team 1	Series	Team 2	Game 1	Game 2	Game 3	Game 4	Game 5
(1) Purefoods Tender Juicy Hotdogs	3–2	(2) Diet Sarsi Sizzlers	107–111	112–102	105–109	115–105	107–100

== Third Conference ==
=== Elimination round ===
Pos	Team	W	L	PCT	GB	Qualification
1	Pepsi Hotshots	8	3	.727	—	Semifinal round
2	Alaska Milkmen	7	4	.636	1	Semifinal round
3	Ginebra San Miguel	7	4	.636	1	Semifinal round
4	San Miguel Beermen	6	5	.545	2	Semifinal round
5	Tivoli Milkmasters	6	5	.545	2	Semifinal round
6	Shell Rimula X	4	7	.364	4	
7	Swify Mighty Meaty Hotdogs	4	7	.364	4	
8	Purefoods Tender Juicy Hotdogs	2	9	.182	6	

=== Semifinal round ===
Overall standings
Pos	Team	W	L	PCT	GB	Qualification
1	Alaska Milkmen	12	7	.632 (Note: Head-to-head record: Alaska 2–1 Ginebra)	—	Advance to the Finals
2	Ginebra San Miguel	12	7	.632	—	Advance to the Finals
3	Pepsi Hotshots	11	8	.579	1	Proceed to third place playoffs
4	San Miguel Beermen	10	9	.526	2	Proceed to third place playoffs
5	Tivoli Milkmasters	9	10	.474	3	

Notes:

Semifinal round standings
Pos	Team	W	L
1	Alaska Milkmen	5	3
2	Ginebra San Miguel	5	3
3	San Miguel Beermen	4	4
4	Pepsi Hotshots	3	5
5	Tivoli Milkmasters	3	5

=== Third place playoffs ===
Team 1	Series	Team 2	Game 1	Game 2	Game 3
(3) Pepsi Hotshots	1–2	(4) San Miguel Beermen	116–119	109–105	109–114

=== Finals ===
Team 1	Series	Team 2	Game 1	Game 2	Game 3	Game 4	Game 5
(1) Alaska Milkmen	3–1	(2) Ginebra San Miguel	93–92	105–107	122–103	99–90	—

- Best Import of the Conference: Wes Matthews (Ginebra)

== Awards ==
- Most Valuable Player: Alvin Patrimonio (Purefoods)
- Rookie of the Year: Eugene Quilban (Alaska)
- Most Improved Player: Ato Agustin (San Miguel)
- Mythical Five:
  - Jojo Lastimosa (Alaska)
  - Allan Caidic (Tivoli)
  - Ramon Fernandez (San Miguel)
  - Alvin Patrimonio (Purefoods)
  - Benjie Paras (Shell)
- Mythical Second Team:
  - Ronnie Magsanoc (Shell)
  - Ato Agustin (San Miguel)
  - Jerry Codiñera (Purefoods)
  - Alvin Teng (San Miguel)
  - Elpidio Villamin (Sarsi/Swift)
- All-Defensive Team:
  - Jerry Codiñera (Purefoods)
  - Glenn Capacio (Purefoods)
  - Alvin Teng (San Miguel)
  - Biboy Ravanes (Alaska)
  - Chito Loyzaga (Ginebra)

== Cumulative standings ==
Pos	Team	Pld	W	L	PCT	Best finish
1	Alaska Milkmen	56	31	25	.554	Champions
2	Ginebra San Miguel	60	33	27	.550	Champions
3	Diet Sarsi Sizzlers/Swift Mighty Meaty Hotdogs	58	31	27	.534	Finalist
4	San Miguel Beermen	64	33	31	.516	Third place
5	Shell Rimula X	48	23	25	.479	Finalist
6	Purefoods Tender Juicy Hotdogs	57	27	30	.474	Champions
7	Pepsi Hotshots/7-Up Uncolas	44	19	25	.432	Semifinalist
8	Presto Tivolis/Tivoli Milkmasters	49	21	28	.429	Semifinalist

=== Elimination round ===
Pos	Team	Pld	W	L	PCT
1	San Miguel Beermen	33	19	14	.576
2	Diet Sarsi Sizzlers/Swift Mighty Meaty Hotdogs	33	18	15	.545
3	Alaska Milkmen	33	17	16	.515
4	Ginebra San Miguel	33	16	17	.485
5	Presto Tivolis/Tivoli Milkmasters	33	16	17	.485
6	Shell Rimula X	33	16	17	.485
7	Purefoods Tender Juicy Hotdogs	33	15	18	.455
8	Pepsi Hotshots/7-Up Uncolas	33	15	18	.455

=== Playoffs ===
Pos	Team	Pld	W	L
1	Ginebra San Miguel	27	17	10
2	Alaska Milkmen	23	14	9
3	San Miguel Beermen	31	14	17
4	Diet Sarsi Sizzlers/Swift Mighty Meaty Hotdogs	25	13	12
5	Purefoods Tender Juicy Hotdogs	24	12	12
6	Shell Rimula X	15	7	8
7	Presto Tivolis/Tivoli Milkmasters	16	5	11
8	Pepsi Hotshots/7-Up Uncolas	11	4	7
