= 1991 Swift Mighty Meaty Hotdogs season =

- Head coach: Yeng Guiao
- General manager: Elmer Yanga
- Owners: Cosmos Bottling Corporation (A subsidiary of RFM Corporation)

First Conference results
- Record: 12–10 (54.5%)
- Place: 3rd
- Playoff finish: Semifinals

All-Filipino Conference results
- Record: 15–10 (60%)
- Place: 2nd
- Playoff finish: Finals

Third Conference results
- Record: 4–7 (36.4%)
- Place: 7th
- Playoff finish: Eliminated

Swift Mighty Meaty Hotdogs seasons

The 1991 Swift Mighty Meaty Hotdogs season was the 2nd season of the franchise in the Philippine Basketball Association (PBA). Known as the Diet Sarsi Sizzlers in the First and All-Filipino Conference.

== Draft pick ==
Round	Pick	Player	Details
2		Django Rivera	Unsigned

== Occurrences ==
Sizzlers' former import Lewis Lloyd replaces Kenny Sanders after Diet Sarsi lost their first game, 83–98 to Presto Tivoli. Lloyd led his team to one victory before getting injured and was replaced by Bernard Thompson.

On April 14, the Sizzlers signed up Purefoods' back-up center Jack Tanuan, whose contract with the Hotdogs expired a week before.

The PBA office fined the RFM franchise P50,000 and Purefoods forward Alvin Patrimonio P10,000 for tampering a contract.

Beginning the Third Conference, Diet Sarsi change its team name to Swift Mighty Meaty Hotdogs, a brand the RFM Company has been carrying during their amateur days.

== Notable dates ==
March 7: Diet Sarsi snapped a four-game winning run of erstwhile unbeaten Purefoods in a 103–96 win. Al Solis, a former hotdogs who played a big role in their last year's title-conquest, hit a jumper off a foul by Elmer Reyes and completed a three-point play to give Sarsi a six-point cushion with 2:39 left in the game.

July 4: The Sizzlers raise their won-loss record to six wins and one defeat and on top of the standings in the All-Filipino Conference, dealing Purefoods its first loss in five games by winning over the Tender Juicy Hotdogs, 102–98.

July 14: Al Solis pumped-in a running shot that banked off the board and went in to lift Diet Sarsi to a 105–104 triumph over San Miguel Beermen. Solis had taken possession at midcourt from Yoyoy Villamin who was hounded by Romy Lopez at the baseline. Then the Sarsi guard, who was still 25 meters from the goal, dribbled past Renato Agustin and heaved that shot from about 23 feet, erasing a 102–104 deficit and giving them their seventh win in nine games. Solis' last-second three-pointer spoiled a career-high 44-point production by Beermen' Ato Agustin. San Miguel put the game under protest as coach Norman Black contested that the clock didn't move when Solis received the inbound pass, but the Beermen later decided not to file a protest and accepted their second loss from the Sizzlers.

== Runner-up finish ==
In only their fifth conference so far, Diet Sarsi makes it to the finals for the first time. The Sizzlers defeated San Miguel Beermen, 100–95, in a playoff game on August 20 as they'll face corporate rival Purefoods for the All-Filipino crown.

The Sizzlers took a 2–1 series lead and a win away from winning their first title, the Tender Juicy Hotdogs came back to win the last two games to finally ended their frustrations on winning the elusive All-Filipino championship.

== Roster ==
1991 Swift Mighty Meaty Hotdogs roster
Players

Pos.	#	POB	Name	Height	Weight	DOB (YYYY–MM–DD)	From
C	5	(Philippines)	Sonny Cabatu	6 ft 5 in (1.96 m)			PSBA
G/F	6	(Philippines)	Ricardo Cui	6 ft 3 in (1.91 m)			Lyceum
G/F	7	(Philippines)	Edgar Macaraya	6 ft 0 in (1.83 m)			San Sebastian
G	8	(Philippines)	Al Solis	5 ft 11 in (1.80 m)			Visayas
F/C	13	(Philippines)	Elpidio Villamin	6 ft 2 in (1.88 m)
G	14	(Philippines)	Joey Loyzaga	6 ft 1 in (1.85 m)			San Beda
F	17	(Philippines)	Terry Saldaña	6 ft 3 in (1.91 m)			Letran
G	23	(Philippines)	Ric-Ric Marata	5 ft 8 in (1.73 m)			Southwestern-U
G	25	(Philippines)	Pido Jarencio	5 ft 10 in (1.78 m)			UST
F	26	(Philippines)	Andy De Guzman	6 ft 2 in (1.88 m)			Far Eastern
C	41	(Philippines)	Jack Tanuan	6 ft 5 in (1.96 m)			Far Eastern
G	51	(Philippines)	Bernie Fabiosa	5 ft 8 in (1.73 m)			UE

Coaches

Head coach

- (Philippines) Yeng Guiao

Assistant coach(es)

- (Philippines) Roehl Nadurata
- (Philippines) Arturo Valenzona

Legend

- (C) Team captain
- Injured

== Transactions ==
=== Trades ===
Off-season	To Alaska Milkmen Elmer Reyes	To Diet Sarsi Elpidio Villamin

Off season	To Alaska Milkmen Nap Hatton	To Diet Sarsi Ricardo Marata

=== Additions ===
Name	Deal Information	Former team
Al Solis	Offered a two-year package worth 2.8 million contract which Purefoods didn't match	Purefoods
Edgar Macaraya	Rookie Free Agent	N/A
Jack Tanuan	Signed upon his end of contract with Purefoods in April 1991	Purefoods
Bernie Fabiosa	Signed in the All-Filipino Conference	Purefoods

=== Subtractions ===
NAME	#	POS	HT	COLLEGE	REASON
Joseph Pelaez	11	C	6"5'	University of Manila	Release by Sarsi upon signing Jack Tanuan

=== Recruited imports ===
Name	Conference	No.	Pos.	Ht.	College	Duration
Kenny Sanders	First Conference	33	Center-Forward	6"4'	George Mason University	February 19 (one game)
Lewis Lloyd	First Conference	32	Center-Forward	6"4'	Drake University	February 24 (one game)
Bernard Thompson	First Conference	34	Center-Forward	6"4'	Fresno State University	March 3 to May 9
Kelvin Upshaw	Third Conference	77	Guard	6"1'	University of Utah	September 15 to October 29
