= 1991 Pepsi Hotshots season =

- Head coach: Derrick Pumaren
- General manager: Steve Watson
- Owner: Pepsi Philippines

First Conference results
- Record: 4–7 (36.4%)
- Place: 6th
- Playoff finish: N/A

All-Filipino Conference results
- Record: 3–8 (27.3%)
- Place: 8th
- Playoff finish: N/A

Third Conference results
- Record: 12–10 (54.5%)
- Place: 4th
- Playoff finish: Semifinals

Pepsi Hotshots seasons

The 1991 Pepsi Hotshots season was the 2nd season of the franchise in the Philippine Basketball Association (PBA).

== Draft pick ==
Round	Pick	Player	Details
2		Juancho Estrada	Unsigned

== Occurrences ==
Pepsi Cola tendered an offer sheet to Purefoods forward Alvin Patrimonio, a five-year worth P25.3 million contract, which Purefoods expectedly matched, making Alvin Patrimonio the highest paid basketball player in the PBA.

== Notable dates ==
March 21: Pepsi eked out a 131-129 win over Presto Tivoli which felt robbed of a strong chances in overtime when a referee's call decided the outcome of the game. Abet Guidaben sank two free throws with no time left on a foul slapped on Presto import Dwayne McClain. The Hotshots' win was their fourth in eight games as this was their first back-to-back victories in franchise history.

July 9: Abet Guidaben's go-ahead basket with eight seconds to go lift Pepsi to a repeat 107-106 overtime win over Shell for only their second victory in eight games in the All-Filipino Conference.

July 13: Pepsi stays alive in contention for a semifinal seat with a 99-88 win over Purefoods in Sta.Cruz, Laguna. The victory raised their record to three wins and six losses.

October 3: Import Perry McDonald led Pepsi to their second straight victory after they lost their first two games in the Third Conference. The Hotshots fashioned out a 144-130 win over Swift Mighty Meaties.

October 27: Pepsi Hotshots beats Shell Rimula-X, 117-107, at the close of the elimination round for the conference-best eight wins and three losses. The Hotshots ride high on a six-game winning streak, the longest in franchise' two-year history, Pepsi won eight of their last nine games since Perry McDonald arrived to replace Donald Petties.

== Roster ==
1991 Pepsi Hotshots roster
Players

Pos.	#	POB	Name	Height	Weight	DOB (YYYY–MM–DD)	From
C	1	(Philippines)	Manny Victorino	6 ft 5 in (1.96 m)			José Rizal
G/F	2	(Philippines)	Alejo Alolor	6 ft 1 in (1.85 m)			Visayas
G	4	(Philippines)	Eric Altamirano	5 ft 11 in (1.80 m)			UP Diliman
G	5	(Philippines)	Gilbert Reyes	5 ft 8 in (1.73 m)			Ateneo
G	7	(Philippines)	Mark Anthony Tallo	5 ft 6 in (1.68 m)			SWU
G	8	(Philippines)	Rey Yncierto	6 ft 0 in (1.83 m)			Cebu
G/F	9	(Philippines)	Ludovico Valenciano	6 ft 2 in (1.88 m)			USLS
G	10	(Philippines)	Carlito Mejos	5 ft 11 in (1.80 m)			Visayas
C	11	(Philippines)	Tonichi Yturri	6 ft 5 in (1.96 m)			De La Salle
F	15	(Philippines)	Salvador Ramos	6 ft 3 in (1.91 m)			Letran
C	23	(Philippines)	Abet Guidaben	6 ft 5 in (1.96 m)			USJ–R
F	29	(Philippines)	Bernardo Carpio	6 ft 3 in (1.91 m)			Ateneo
F	30	(Philippines)	Dennis Abbatuan	6 ft 2 in (1.88 m)			José Rizal
G	42	(Philippines)	Willie Generalao	5 ft 8 in (1.73 m)			Visayas

Coaches

Head coach

- (Philippines) Derrick Pumaren

Assistant coach(es)

- (Philippines) Gabby Velasco

Legend

- (C) Team captain
- Injured

== Transactions ==
=== Trades ===
Off-season	To Presto Tivoli 2nd overall pick (Rookie draft)	To Pepsi Hotshots Manny Victorino

Off season	To Presto Tivoli Cadel Mosqueda	To Pepsi Hotshots Bernardo Carpio

=== Additions ===
Name	Deal Information	Former team
Willie Generalao	Acquired via free agency	Presto Tivoli
Ludovico Valenciano	Acquired from Purefoods in a trade with Jun Tan, whom they got from Sarsi	Purefoods
Eric Altamirano	Acquired from Alaska by giving up their first round pick next year	Alaska
Mark Anthony Tallo	Rookie free agent signed in the Third Conference	N/A

=== Recruited imports ===
Name	Conference	No.	Pos.	Ht.	College	Duration
Lanard Copeland	First Conference	21	Forward	6"5'	Georgia State	February 17 to April 7
Donald Petties	Third Conference	3	Forward	6"4'	University of Wisconsin	September 15-19
Perry McDonald	Third Conference	20	Center	6"4'	Georgetown University	September 24 to December 12
