= 1991 Alaska Milkmen season =

- Head coach: Tim Cone
- General manager: Joaqui Trillo
- Owner: Fred Uytengsu

First Conference results
- Record: 4–7 (36.4%)
- Place: 8th
- Playoff finish: Eliminated

All-Filipino Conference results
- Record: 12–10 (54.5%)
- Place: 3rd
- Playoff finish: Semifinals

Third Conference results
- Record: 15–8 (65.2%)
- Place: 1st
- Playoff finish: Finals

Alaska Milkmen seasons

The 1991 Alaska Milkmen season was the 6th season of the franchise in the Philippine Basketball Association (PBA).

== Draft picks ==
Round	Pick	Player	Details
1	1	Alejandro Araneta	Signed
1	3	Eugene Quilban	Signed
2		Rosedendo Gomez	Signed

== Notable dates ==
March 26: Alaska narrowly escape with a 100-99 squeaker over San Miguel Beermen for their second straight win and only their third victory in nine games as the Milkmen are in a must-win situation to stay in contention for a semifinals berth.

June 18: The Milkmen nip Diet Sarsi, 97-96, on Frankie Lim's triple in the last three seconds for their third straight win in the All-Filipino Conference.

June 25: Trailing by 13 points going into the fourth period, the Milkmen bounced back to deal the Tivoli Milkmasters their third straight setback, 99-94, as Alaska remains unbeaten with their fourth win in a row.

October 17: Alaska nip Swift, 108-106, for their seventh win in nine games as they dealt the Mighty Meaties their third straight setback.

== First title ==
Sean Chambers was back anew for the Third Conference and "Mr.Excitement" Paul Alvarez was ready to play and rejoined his new teammates. The Milkmen were on top in Group B after the elimination round with seven wins and four losses. Alaska split their first four games in the semifinals and looks headed for another disappointing finish in search for their first championship as they were lagging behind Ginebra and Pepsi Hotshots in the standings, but just as quickly, the Milkmen bounced back with victories over Tivoli Milk and Ginebra San Miguel.

On November 21, Alaska Milk sealed a championship showdown with Ginebra by defeating San Miguel Beermen, 94-80, in the last scheduled date of the semifinal round for their 12th win in 19 games. Alaska won their first-ever PBA title with a 3-1 series victory over Ginebra San Miguel in the best-of-five series.

== Awards ==
- Eugene Quilban was named the season's Rookie of the year.
- Import Sean Chambers became the second recipient of the Mr.100% award.

== Roster ==
1991 Alaska Milkmen roster
Players

Pos.	#	POB	Name	Height	Weight	DOB (YYYY–MM–DD)	From
C	4	(Philippines)	Peter Aguilar	6 ft 5 in (1.96 m)			TUA
G/F	6	(Philippines)	Biboy Ravanes	6 ft 0 in (1.83 m)			Cebu
G	7	(Philippines)	Roehl Gomez	6 ft 0 in (1.83 m)			Cebu
F	8	(Philippines)	Nandy Garcia	6 ft 2 in (1.88 m)			Adamson
G/F	9	(Philippines)	Jojo Lastimosa	6 ft 0 in (1.83 m)			USJ–R
C	10	(Philippines)	Adriano Polistico	6 ft 7 in (2.01 m)			Letran
G	11	(Philippines)	Eugene Quilban	5 ft 7 in (1.70 m)			San Sebastian
F	12	(Philippines)	Eton Navarro	6 ft 0 in (1.83 m)			San Sebastian
C	14	(Philippines)	Alex Araneta	6 ft 6 in (1.98 m)			Ateneo
C	16	(Philippines)	Macario Torres	6 ft 4 in (1.93 m)			Far Eastern
F	20	(United States)	Sean Chambers (I)	6 ft 1 in (1.85 m)			Cal Poly
G	22	(Philippines)	Frankie Lim	5 ft 10 in (1.78 m)			San Beda
F	23	(Philippines)	Paul Alvarez	6 ft 0 in (1.83 m)			San Sebastian
F	55	(Philippines)	Nap Hatton	6 ft 1 in (1.85 m)			San Sebastian

Coaches

Head coach

- (United States) Tim Cone

Assistant coach(es)

- (Philippines) Chot Reyes
- (Philippines) Aric del Rosario

Team manager

- (Philippines) Joaquin Trillo

Legend

- (C) Team captain
- (I) Import
- Injured

== Transactions ==
=== Trades ===
Off-season	To Purefoods Boy Cabahug	To Alaska Milkmen Jojo Lastimosa
Off-season	To Diet Sarsi Ric-Ric Marata	To Alaska Milkmen Napoleon Hatton

=== Additions ===
Player	Signed	Former team
Fernando Garcia	Off-season	Sarsi
Peter Aguilar	Off-season	Añejo Rum 65
Francisco Navarro ^{rookie}	June 1991	N/A

=== Subtractions ===
Player	Signed	New team
Harmon Codiñera	March 1991	Purefoods
