= 1991 Ginebra San Miguel season =

- Head coach: Robert Jaworski
- General Manager: Bernabe Navarro
- Owner(s): La Tondeña Distillers, Inc.

First Conference results
- Record: 16–10 (61.5%)
- Place: 1st
- Playoff finish: Champions

All-Filipino Conference results
- Record: 4–7 (36.4%)
- Place: 7th
- Playoff finish: Eliminated

Third Conference results
- Record: 13–10 (56.5%)
- Place: 2nd
- Playoff finish: Runner-up

Ginebra San Miguel seasons

The 1991 Ginebra San Miguel season was the 13th season of the franchise in the Philippine Basketball Association (PBA).

== Draft pick ==
| Round | Pick | Player | Details |
|---|---|---|---|
| 1 | 5 | Jayvee Gayoso | Signed |

== 3rd Championship ==
Formerly the Añejo Rum 65ers, the La Tondeña ballclub returns to its old brand name Ginebra San Miguel beginning the season. In the First Conference, the Ginebras were in danger of being eliminated going into their last two games in the elimination round. In a must-win situation, Ginebra beat Purefoods, 137-133 on April 2, and Alaska, 123-117 on April 7, to advance into the semifinals with five wins and six losses and at the bottom of the five-team semis cast.

After losing their first semifinal assignment to Shell, 120-121 on April 11, the never-say-die Ginebras racked up seven straight victories to march to the finals rematch with arch-rivals Shell Turbo Chargers. Ginebra San Miguel made history by coming back from a 1-3 series deficit to take the last three games and win the championship, highlighted by Rudy Distrito's winning shot in the last five seconds of the thrilling Game Seven with the score tied at 102-all.

== Runner-up finish ==
Ginebra signed up Wes Matthews, a member of the 1987-88 NBA World Champions Los Angeles Lakers, as their import in the Third Conference. Matthews led the team to seven wins and four losses in the elimination round. The Ginebras won their first five semifinal games for a return trip to the finals, this time playing against the Alaska Milkmen. Ginebra lost in four games to Alaska in the best-of-five title series with rumors abound possible changes in their lineup next season following the reduced playing time of some of their key players in Game four finals loss.

== Occurrences ==
Assistant coach Rino Salazar accepted the offer to coach Shell beginning the Third Conference and in his place, Ginebra hired Shell's former coach Arlene Rodriguez, whom Salazar replaced on the Turbo Chargers' bench.

== Notable dates ==
March 10: Ginebra snapped out of a three-game losing skein as new import Jervis Cole sizzled for 41 points and 19 rebounds, capping his brilliant stint when he canned-in two free throws with two seconds left in lifting the Gins to a 110-109 win over Presto Tivoli. Cole is the third Ginebra import to arrived after Ron Davis (three games) and William Alexander (one game).

April 21: The Ginebras came back from 19 points down in the fourth quarter and behind the plays of Dondon Ampalayo and import Jervis Cole, a final 9-1 blast gave the Gins a dramatic 126-125 come-from-behind victory over Diet Sarsi after trailing 117-124 with only 32 seconds left in the game. The win put Ginebra in a triple-tie at second place with Sarsi and Purefoods at the end of the first round of the semifinals.

May 2: Ginebra led 16-0 over importless-Purefoods early in the first quarter and never look back in a 126-108 victory to set the stage for an explosive finals grudge rematch opposite last year's championship rival Shell Rimula-X Turbo Chargers.

May 14: In Game five of the First Conference finals with Shell leading the series, three games to one, a 30-0 blast in the fourth quarter silence the Turbo Chargers for some five minutes and allowed Ginebra to turn a close game into a rout, pulling away with a 116-90 victory and stays alive in the finals series.

May 19: Rudy Distrito caught a pinpoint inbound pass from Sonny Jaworski and then delivered on a drive with one second left that lifted the Gins to a 104-102 win over Shell in Game Seven for the First Conference championship as they completed a remarkable comeback in the playoffs and bag their third PBA title.

June 29: Ginebra beats Alaska, 75-68, in a low-scoring contest in the out-of-town game in Baguio City for their second win in five games in the All-Filipino Conference. The Milkmen's 68-point total broke the previous all-time low of 69 points made by Presto back in 1981.

July 7: The Ginebras rode on the heroics of playing-coach Sonny Jaworski's fired-up game and pinpoint passing in the fourth quarter with Dondon Ampalayo hitting a basket from close range as Ginebra pulled a 104-103 win over league-leading Diet Sarsi. The Gins, which trailed by as many as 11 points, improved to three wins and four losses. The Sizzlers' defeat dropped their win–loss standings to 6-2.

October 6: With both teams carrying an identical two wins and two loss slate, Ginebra prevailed over Pepsi Hotshots, 117-112, in a match where Ginebra playing-coach Sonny Jaworski was ejected from two technical fouls and Pepsi import Perry McDonald being given a technical just as the game was about to end. Jaworski fouled a driving Abet Guidaben, who fell down and then confronted the Ginebra playing coach, McDonald intervened by grabbing the Big J's nape.

October 31: Ginebra San Miguel repeated over Pepsi Hotshots, 114-111, at the start of the semifinal round of the Third Conference as they halted the six-game winning streak of the Hotshots and tied them on top of the standings with eight wins and four losses.

November 12: At the start of the second round in the semifinals, Ginebra defeated Pepsi for the third time in the conference, 123-120. The score was tied at 120-all with only few seconds remaining and ball possession for the Hotshots, Ginebra import Wes Matthews stole the ball from Willie Generalao and then let go of a 35-footer that swished the net with one second left. The victory gave the Gins their seventh straight win since their last two games in the eliminations and their 12th victory in 16 games, assuring them of one of the two finals berth.

== Roster ==
1991 Ginebra San Miguel roster
Players

| Pos. | # | POB | Name | Height | Weight | DOB (YYYY–MM–DD) | From |
|---|---|---|---|---|---|---|---|
| F | 6 | (Philippines) | Dondon Ampalayo | 6 ft 3 in (1.91 m) | | | USJ–R |
| G | 7 | (Philippines) | Robert Jaworski | 6 ft 1 in (1.85 m) | | | UE |
| G/F | 8 | (Philippines) | Silverio Palad | 6 ft 2 in (1.88 m) | | | UST |
| G | 9 | (Philippines) | Leo Isaac | 6 ft 1 in (1.85 m) | | | Mapúa |
| C | 10 | (Philippines) | Anthony Poblador | 6 ft 6 in (1.98 m) | | | De La Salle |
| G/F | 11 | (Philippines) | Jayvee Gayoso | 6 ft 1 in (1.85 m) | | | Ateneo |
| F | 12 | (Philippines) | Dante Gonzalgo | 6 ft 2 in (1.88 m) | | | Lyceum |
| F | 14 | (Philippines) | Larry Villanil | 6 ft 1 in (1.85 m) | | | Visayas |
| C | 15 | (Philippines) | Rey Cuenco | 6 ft 4 in (1.93 m) | | | GAUF |
| G | 17 | (Philippines) | Rudy Distrito | 5 ft 11 in (1.80 m) | | | UE |
| F | 18 | (Philippines) | Philip Cezar | 6 ft 3 in (1.91 m) | | | JRC |
| G/F | 41 | (Philippines) | Chito Loyzaga | 6 ft 2 in (1.88 m) | | | San Beda |

Coaches

Head coach

- (Philippines) Robert Jaworski

Assistant coach(es)

- (Philippines) Arlene Rodriguez
- (Philippines) Rino Salazar

Team manager

- (Philippines) Bernabe Navarro

Legend

- (C) Team captain
- Injured

== Transactions ==
=== Rookie free agents ===
| Player | Signed | Former team |
| Silverio Palad | Off-season | N/A |
| Anthony Poblador | Off-season | N/A |

=== Recruited imports ===
| Name | Conference | No. | Pos. | Ht. | College | Duration |
|---|---|---|---|---|---|---|
| Ronald Davis | First Conference | 2 | Center | 6'5" | Arizona State University | February 19–28 |
| William Alexander | First Conference | | Guard-Forward | 6'5" | | March 5 (one game) |
| Jervis Cole | First Conference | 32 | Forward | 6'5" | Fresno State University | March 10 to May 19 |
| Wes Matthews | Third Conference | 1 | Guard | 6'1" | University of Wisconsin | September 15 to December 15 |
