= 1991 Shell Rimula X season =

- Head coach: Arlene Rodriguez; Rino Salazar
- General Manager: Charlie Favis
- Owner(s): Pilipinas Shell

First Conference results
- Record: 15–11 (57.7%)
- Place: 2nd
- Playoff finish: Finals

All-Filipino Conference results
- Record: 4–7 (36.4%)
- Place: 6th
- Playoff finish: N/A

Third Conference results
- Record: 4–7 (36.4%)
- Place: 6th
- Playoff finish: N/A

Shell Rimula X seasons

The 1991 Shell Rimula X season was the 7th season of the franchise in the Philippine Basketball Association (PBA).

== Draft picks ==
Round	Pick	Player	Details
1	7	Ronald Lucero	Signed, played only two games
2		MacDonald De Joya	Unsigned, free agent

== Runner-up finish ==
The defending champions in the First Conference with five-time best import Bobby Parks back anew as expected finish on top of the eliminations with eight wins and three losses. Shell clinch the first finals berth on April 23 with its 12th win in 16 outings, a 141–124 victory over Diet Sarsi. The Turbo Chargers dropped their last three semifinal matches entering the championship rematch with Ginebra San Miguel.

Shell won Game one, halting the Ginebras' seven-game win streak in the semifinals and the first four games of the title-series went the same pattern as last year with the Turbo Chargers winning Games three and four to take a 3–1 lead in the best-of-seven series. In Game five, Shell was leading 85–80 in the first four minutes of the final quarter when Ginebra unleashed a 30–0 bomb to win going away and with the momentum on Ginebra's side, Shell lost Game six and the final game of the series.

== Occurrences ==
The Turbo Chargers went down to one victory and six losses during the All-Filipino Conference and coach Arlene Rodriguez' contract was not renewed. The team's trainer Hercules Callanta took over from Rodriguez in their remaining assignments.

Ginebra assistant coach Rino Salazar accepted the offer of Shell to become their new head coach beginning the Third Conference.

== Notable dates ==
July 11: Shell romped off with a convincing 105–96 win over Alaska Milk for only their second win in eight outings in the All-Filipino Conference.

September 29: After losing their first three games in the Third Conference, the Turbo Chargers finally gave their new coach Rino Salazar his first win, a 104–92 victory over Alaska Milkmen.

October 20: Shell blew a 21-point lead early in the final quarter but recovered in time to turn back Ginebra San Miguel, 126–120, and keep its slim, semifinal hopes alive. Michael Morrison, who was actually Shell's original choice for an import but was unavailable before the conference started, scored 39 points as he combined with Benjie Paras and Romy Dela Rosa for 94 points out of Shell's total output of 126.

== Roster ==
1991 Shell Rimula X roster
Players

Pos.	#	POB	Name	Height	Weight	DOB (YYYY–MM–DD)	From
G/F	2	(Philippines)	Jay Ramirez	6 ft 2 in (1.88 m)			Visayas
C	4	(Philippines)	Romulo Mamaril	6 ft 6 in (1.98 m)			Mapúa
G	5	(Philippines)	Ronnie Magsanoc	5 ft 9 in (1.75 m)			UP Diliman
F	8	(Philippines)	Jerry Ruiz	6 ft 2 in (1.88 m)			Letran
F	10	(Philippines)	Jojo Martin	6 ft 3 in (1.91 m)			NCBA
F	12	(Philippines)	Romeo Dela Rosa	6 ft 2 in (1.88 m)			Southwestern-U
G	13	(Philippines)	Leo Austria	5 ft 10 in (1.78 m)			Lyceum
C	14	(Philippines)	Benjie Paras	6 ft 5 in (1.96 m)			UP Diliman
F/C	15	(Philippines)	Ricky Relosa	6 ft 3 in (1.91 m)			Mapúa
F	24	(Philippines)	Richard Bognot	6 ft 3 in (1.91 m)
C	25	(Philippines)	Gido Babilonia	6 ft 6 in (1.98 m)			UST
G	33	(Philippines)	Calvin Tuadles	5 ft 11 in (1.80 m)			Southwestern-U
F	71	(Philippines)	Manuel Marquez	6 ft 2 in (1.88 m)			San Beda

Coaches

Head coach

- (Philippines) Arlene Rodriguez
- (Philippines) Rino Salazar (3rd Conference)

Assistant coach(es)

- (Philippines) Herc Callanta
- (Philippines) Manuel Pineda (3rd Conference)

Team manager

- (Philippines) Charlie Favis

Legend

- (C) Team captain
- Injured

== Transactions ==
=== Additions ===
Player	Signed	Former team
Gido Babilonia	Off-season	Purefoods
Romulo Mamaril	Off-season	Añejo Rum 65
Ricky Relosa	June 1991	Pepsi
Manuel Marquez	June 1991	Presto Tivoli

=== Recruited imports ===
Name	Conference	No.	Pos.	Ht.	College	Duration
Bobby Parks	First Conference	22	Forward	6"3'	Memphis State University	February 17 to May 19
Luther Burks	Third Conference	21	Guard	6"2'	Oklahoma City University	September 17 to October 8
Mike Morrison	Third Conference	7	Guard-Forward	6"2'	Loyola College, Maryland	October 17–27
