= 1991 Purefoods Tender Juicy Hotdogs season =

- Head coach: Baby Dalupan (1st Conference); Ely Capacio
- General manager: Domingo Panganiban
- Owner: Purefoods Corporation

First Conference results
- Record: 10–12 (45.5%)
- Place: 4th
- Playoff finish: Semifinals

All-Filipino Conference results
- Record: 15–9 (62.5%)
- Place: 1st
- Playoff finish: Champions

Third Conference results
- Record: 2–9 (18.2%)
- Place: 8th
- Playoff finish: Eliminated

Purefoods Tender Juicy Hotdogs seasons

The 1991 Purefoods Tender Juicy Hotdogs season was the 4th season of the franchise in the Philippine Basketball Association (PBA).

== Draft picks ==
Round	Pick	Player	Details
1	6	Rudy Enterina	Signed
2		Joey Santamaria	Signed

== Occurrences ==
The March 17 game between Purefoods and Shell was put under protest when Hotdogs import Richard Hollis converted on a follow-up shot as time expired giving the Hotdogs a one-point win, 124-123. The controversial match was ordered to be replayed and scheduled on April 9.

When Purefoods defeated Pepsi Hotshots, 105-95 in Cabanatuan City on March 23, a fistfight occurred between guards Dindo Pumaren and Jun Reyes of Pepsi with only 1:30 left in the game. It was further aggravated when hotdogs rookie Joey Santamaria entered the fray.

Following a 107-124 loss to Shell during the first round of the semifinals in the First Conference on April 18, coach Baby Dalupan has submitted his resignation, citing indifferences with the Purefoods management as his reason for quitting the team. Assistant coach Ely Capacio took over the vacant spot left by the league's winningest coach.

Import Richard Hollis left the team unnoticed prior to their must-win situation against Ginebra San Miguel during the last playing date of the semifinals in the First Conference on May 2. It was the second time in Purefoods history that an import deserted them in an all-important game.

Pepsi Cola tendered an offer sheet amounting to P25.3 million for the services of Hotdogs' forward Alvin Patrimonio, whose contract expired on June 30. The Purefoods management matched Pepsi's tempting offer, making Alvin Patrimonio the highest paid cager in the league.

== Championship ==
The Purefoods Tender Juicy Hotdogs won their first All-Filipino crown over corporate rival Diet Sarsi. The finals victory was the Hotdogs' second title in the last three conferences.

== Awards ==
- Alvin Patrimonio won the Most Valuable Player trophy.
- Jerry Codiñera made it to the Mythical second team and he and Glenn Capacio were named to the All-defensive team.

== Roster ==
1991 Purefoods Tender Juicy Hotdogs roster
Players

Pos.	#	POB	Name	Height	Weight	DOB (YYYY–MM–DD)	From
G/F	4	(Philippines)	Elmer Reyes	6 ft 1 in (1.85 m)			San Beda
G/F	9	(Philippines)	Boy Cabahug	5 ft 11 in (1.80 m)			Visayas
G	10	(Philippines)	Dindo Pumaren	5 ft 9 in (1.75 m)			De La Salle
F	11	(Philippines)	Nelson Asaytono	6 ft 3 in (1.91 m)			Manila
G/F	12	(Philippines)	Glenn Capacio	6 ft 1 in (1.85 m)			Far Eastern
F/C	15	(Philippines)	Joey Santamaria	6 ft 3 in (1.91 m)			De La Salle
F	16	(Philippines)	Alvin Patrimonio	6 ft 3 in (1.91 m)			Mapúa
G	17	(Philippines)	Leoncio Tan	6 ft 0 in (1.83 m)			De La Salle
G	24	(Philippines)	Rudy Enterina	6 ft 0 in (1.83 m)			Visayas
F	31	(Philippines)	Harmon Codinera	6 ft 4 in (1.93 m)			Far Eastern
C	44	(Philippines)	Jerry Codinera	6 ft 5 in (1.96 m)			UE

Coaches

Head coach

- (Philippines) Ely Capacio

Assistant coach(es)

- (Philippines) Cris Calilan

Legend

- (C) Team captain
- Injured

== Transactions ==
=== Trades ===
Off-season	To Alaska Milkmen Jojo Lastimosa	To Purefoods Boy Cabahug
Off-season	To Alaska Milkmen First overall pick (Rookie draft)	To Purefoods Elmer Reyes

=== Additions ===
Player	Signed	Former team
Leoncio Tan, Jr	Off-season	Sarsi
Harmon Codiñera	June 1991	Alaska

=== Subtractions ===
Player	Signed	New team
Jack Tanuan	April 1991	Diet Sarsi

=== Recruited imports ===
Name	Conference	No.	Pos.	Ht.	College	Duration
Richard Hollis	First Conference	00	Guard-Forward	6"4'	University of Houston	February 17 to April 30
Darryl Johnson	Third Conference	3	Guard	6"1'	Michigan State University	September 17–24
Sedric Toney	Third Conference	3	Guard-Forward	6"2'	University of Dayton	October 1–27

== Win–loss record ==
Season Rank	GP	Win	Lost	Pct.
6th Overall	57	27	30	0.474
