= 1991 Tivoli Milkmasters season =

1991 Tivoli Milk Masters season
- Head coach: Jimmy Mariano
- Owner: CFC Corporation

First Conference results
- Record: 4–7 (36.4%)
- Place: 7th
- Playoff finish: Eliminated

All-Filipino Conference results
- Record: 8–11 (42.1%)
- Place: 5th
- Playoff finish: Semifinals

Third Conference results
- Record: 9–10 (47.4%)
- Place: 5th
- Playoff finish: Semifinals

Tivoli Milk Masters seasons

The 1991 Tivoli Milk Masters season was the 17th season of the franchise in the Philippine Basketball Association (PBA). Formerly known as Presto Tivoli Ice Cream in the First Conference.

== Draft picks ==
Round	Pick	Player	Details
1	2	Rene Hawkins	Signed
1	8	Teofano Tiu Jr	Unsigned

== Notable dates ==
March 19: The Tivolis break out of a four-game losing slump with a 119–113 victory over Diet Sarsi.

March 26: Presto scored its fourth win in nine games in a 122–116 victory against Purefoods Hotdogs.

== Scoring record ==
April 4: Import Dwayne McClain scored 74 points in the Tivolis' 117–118 loss to Alaska Milk.

November 21: Allan Caidic achieved a milestone when he surpassed the record for most points by a local player in scoring 79 points in Tivoli's 162–149 win over Ginebra San Miguel, Caidic made 37 points in the second quarter alone and tallied 42 in the second half to break his previous record of 41 points shared with once teammate Ricardo Brown. The Milkmasters dropped out of contention in the Third Conference after losing their first five semifinal assignments. They won their last three outings, highlighted by the 79-point output of Allan Caidic in their last game of the season.

== Roster ==
Tivoli Milk roster
Players
Coaches

Pos.	No.	Nat.	Name	Ht.	Wt.
C	4	(Philippines)	Teddy Alfarero	6 ft 4 in (1.93 m)		De La Salle
G/F	5	(Philippines)	Peter Jao	6 ft 0 in (1.83 m)		USJ–R
F/C	6	(Philippines)	Abe King	6 ft 3 in (1.91 m)		San Beda
G	7	(Philippines)	Arturo Cristobal	6 ft 1 in (1.85 m)		Far Eastern
F	8	(Philippines)	Allan Caidic	6 ft 2 in (1.88 m)		UE
G	9	(Philippines)	Onchie Dela Cruz	5 ft 10 in (1.78 m)		Philippine Christian
F	11	(Philippines)	Arnie Tuadles	6 ft 2 in (1.88 m)		Visayas
F/C	12	(Philippines)	Cadel Mosqueda	6 ft 3 in (1.91 m)		Arellano
G	14	(Philippines)	Gerry Esplana	5 ft 10 in (1.78 m)		Far Eastern
C	15	(Philippines)	Hernani Demigillo	6 ft 5 in (1.96 m)		San Sebastian
F	16	(Philippines)	Bong Hawkins	6 ft 3 in (1.91 m)		UPHSD
G/F	17	(Philippines)	Padim Israel	6 ft 3 in (1.91 m)		Ateneo
C	28	(Philippines)	Zaldy Realubit	6 ft 5 in (1.96 m)		USJ–R

Head coach

- (Philippines) Jimmy Mariano

Assistant coach(es)

- (Philippines) Bong Go
- (Philippines) Nap Flores

Team manager

- (Philippines) Ignacio Gotao

Legend

- (C) Team captain
- Injured

== Transactions ==
=== Trades ===
Off-season	To Pepsi Hotshots Bernardo Carpio	To Presto Tivoli Cadel Mosqueda

=== Additions ===
Player	Signed	Former team
Arturo Cristobal	Off-season	Purefoods
Teddy Alfarero	June 1991	N/A

=== Recruited imports ===
Name	Conference	No.	Pos.	Ht.	College	Duration
Dwayne McClain	First Conference	44	Center-Forward	6"4'	Villanova University	February 19 to April 7
Terrance Bailey	Third Conference	21	Forward-Guard	6"1'	Wagner College	September 17 to November 21
