= 1995 Sunkist Orange Juicers season =

- Head coach: Derrick Pumaren
- General manager: Elmer Yanga
- Owner: RFM Corporation

All Filipino Cup results
- Record: 7–3 (70%)
- Place: 1st
- Playoff finish: Champions (def. Alaska)

Commissioner's Cup results
- Record: 9–1 (90%)
- Place: 1st
- Playoff finish: Champions (def. Alaska)

Governor's Cup results
- Record: 8–2 (80%)
- Place: 1st
- Playoff finish: Semifinals, Third Placer (def. Formula Shell)

Sunkist Orange Juicers seasons

The 1995 Sunkist Orange Juicers season was the 6th season of the franchise in the Philippine Basketball Association (PBA).

== Draft picks ==
Round	Pick	Player	College
1	3	Kenneth Duremdes	Adamson
2		Alejandro Paguinto	FEU

== Summary ==
In the All-Filipino Cup, Sunkist finished on top of the standings with a 7-3 won-loss slate. The Juicers won six of their eight games in the semifinals to advance into the championship playoffs. They battled the Alaska Milkmen for the All-Filipino Cup title in a finals rematch; the two teams had previously fought in the championship in last season's Governors Cup, where Alaska won in six games. Sunkist this time prevailed in a hard-fought seven-game series. Vergel Meneses played the hero's role in the deciding Game Seven. The Juicers were down by four, 69-73, with 25.4 seconds remaining in regulation, and Meneses buried a triple to cut Alaska's lead to a point. The game went into overtime and Sunkist won, 87-78, as the Juicers captured their first All-Filipino title and third overall crown. Sunkist lost Rudy Distrito after Game Four of the finals series when he committed a horrendous shove on a driving Jeffrey Cariaso. Distrito was banned by the PBA for the rest of the season.

Sunkist brought in former Purefoods import Ronnie Grandison in the Commissioners Cup. The Orange Juicers were unbeaten with nine straight victories, but failed to complete a 10-game sweep when they lost to Purefoods Tender Juicy Hotdogs, 81-91, on the last playing date of the eliminations on July 18. Sunkist arranged a best-of-five semifinal series encounter with fourth-seeded Purefoods by winning their last game in the quarterfinals against Formula Shell, 106-103 on August 8. Going up against their two-time tormentors in the conference who were slightly favored, Sunkist won Game One, 85-83, on Meneses' buzzer-beating jump shot. The series went into a deciding fifth game where the Juicers led by as much as 16 points in the fourth quarter and starved off repeated rallies by the Hotdogs to win, 105-99, and set the stage for the third straight Sunkist-Alaska finale. The Orange Juicers won for the second time in a finals series against the Alaska Milkmen, four games to two, to keep their Grandslam hopes alive.

In the Governor's Cup, Sunkist had gotten an impressive reinforcement in Stevin Smith, nickname "Hedake", he often hit clutch treys in the closing seconds of some of the Orange Juicers' exciting wins, particularly their elimination game against Alaska and in their first game in the semifinal round against Formula Shell. The Orange Juicers lost three crucial games towards the end of the semifinals, with Shell pulling off a 113-103 win that ended the Juicers' Grandslam bid. Sunkist placed third in the Governors Cup.

== Notable dates ==
June 11: Sunkist Orange Juicers unleashed its offensive power in the second quarter and went on to trample Purefoods Hotdogs, 104-98. Former Hotdog import Ronnie Grandison topscored for Sunkist with 27 points and 18 rebounds.

June 23: Boybits Victoria hit a fadeaway jumper from the right flank with 22.1 seconds left as Sunkist escaped with a come-from-behind 98-95 victory over Shell for its fourth straight victory.

June 25: Sunkist stays unbeaten and zoomed to their fifth straight win and on top of the Commissioners Cup standings as they demolished All-Filipino rival Alaska Milkmen, 103-87.

October 31: Stevin Smith rose to another level in the last 90 seconds, beating Johnny Abarrientos in a one-on-one duel down the stretch by burying a buzzer-beating three-pointer from the left flank with 1.9 seconds left to give Sunkist a thrilling 101-100 triumph over Alaska Milkmen.

November 12: Stevin Smith again found a way out for Sunkist as he buried a game-deciding three-pointer with 16.1 seconds to play that nipped Formula Shell, 98-96 in overtime.

== Awards ==
- Vergel Meneses bag the season's Most Valuable Player (MVP) award. The Aerial Voyager has also won Best Player of the Conference honors in both the All-Filipino and Commissioner's Cups and was the MVP of the PBA All-Star game, his first of a record-setting four MVP awards.
- Ronnie Grandison was voted the Commissioner's Cup Best Import.
- Stevin Smith was voted the Governor's Cup Best Import.

== Roster ==
1995 Sunkist Orange Juicers roster
Players

Pos.	#	POB	Name	Height	Weight	DOB (YYYY–MM–DD)	From
C	4	(Philippines)	Bonel Balingit	6 ft 9 in (2.06 m)			Visayas
G	8	(Philippines)	Al Solis	5 ft 11 in (1.80 m)			Visayas
G/F	9	(Philippines)	Boybits Victoria	5 ft 11 in (1.80 m)			San Beda
F	10	(Philippines)	Enrique Reyes	6 ft 3 in (1.91 m)			Ateneo
F	11	(Philippines)	Nelson Asaytono	6 ft 3 in (1.91 m)			Manila
F/C	13	(Philippines)	Elpidio Villamin	6 ft 2 in (1.88 m)			Far Eastern
G	14	(Philippines)	Rudy Distrito	5 ft 11 in (1.80 m)			UE
G	16	(Philippines)	Marcelino Albarillo	5 ft 9 in (1.75 m)			Mindanao
C	17	(Philippines)	Alejandro Paguinto	6 ft 5 in (1.96 m)			Far Eastern
F	18	(Philippines)	Vergel Meneses	6 ft 3 in (1.91 m)			José Rizal
F	19	(Philippines)	Kenneth Duremdes	6 ft 3 in (1.91 m)			Adamson
G	23	(Philippines)	Ricardo Marata	5 ft 9 in (1.75 m)			Southwestern-U
C	35	(Philippines)	Zaldy Realubit	6 ft 5 in (1.96 m)			USJ–R

Coaches

Head coach

- (Philippines) Derrick Pumaren

Assistant coach(es)

- (Philippines) Gabby Velasco
- (Philippines) Arturo Valenzona

Legend

- (C) Team captain
- Injured

== Transactions ==
=== Additions ===
Player	Signed	Former team
Ric-Ric Marata	Off-season	Shell

=== Recruited imports ===
IMPORT	Conference	No.	Pos.	Ht.	College	Duration
Ronnie Grandison	Commissioner's Cup	31	Forward	6"5'	UNO	June 11 to September 5
Stevin Smith	Governors Cup	2	Guard	6"0'	Arizona State	October 1 to December 12
