= 1995 PBA Governors' Cup =

1995 PBA Governors Cup
- Duration: September 29 – December 19, 1995
- TV partner(s): Vintage Sports (PTV)

Finals
- Champions: Alaska Milkmen
- Runners-up: San Miguel Beermen

Awards
- Best Player: Allan Caidic (San Miguel Beermen)
- Best Import: Stevin Smith (Sunkist Orange Juicers)

PBA Governors Cup chronology
- < 1994 1996 >

PBA conference chronology
- < 1995 Commissioner's 1996 All-Filipino >

The 1995 Philippine Basketball Association (PBA) Governors Cup was the third and last conference of the 1995 PBA season. It started on September 29 and ended on December 19, 1995. The tournament is an import-laden format, which requires an import or a pure-foreign player for each team.

== Format ==
The following format will be observed for the duration of the conference:

- The teams were divided into 2 groups.

Group A:

1. Pepsi Mega Bottlers
2. Purefoods TJ Hotdogs
3. San Miguel Beermen
4. Sunkist Orange Juicers

Group B:

1. Alaska Milkmen
2. Formula Shell Zoom Masters
3. Ginebra San Miguel
4. Sta. Lucia Realtors

- Teams in a group will play against each other once and against teams in the other group twice; 10 games per team; Teams are then seeded by basis on win–loss records. Ties are broken among point differentials of the tied teams. Standings will be determined in one league table; teams do not qualify by basis of groupings.
- The top five teams after the eliminations will advance to the semifinals.
- Semifinals will be two round robin affairs with the remaining five teams. Results from the eliminations will be carried over. A playoff incentive for a finals berth will be given to the team that will win at least five of their eight semifinal games.
- The top two teams (or the top team and the winner of the playoff incentive) will face each other in a best-of-seven championship series. The next two teams (or the loser of the playoff incentive and the fourth seeded team) dispute the third-place trophy in a best-of-three series.

== Elimination round ==
=== Team standings ===
Pos	Team	W	L	PCT	GB	Qualification
1	Sunkist Orange Juicers	8	2	.800	—	Semifinal round
2	Purefoods Tender Juicy Hotdogs	7	3	.700	1	Semifinal round
3	Alaska Milkmen	7	3	.700	1	Semifinal round
4	San Miguel Beermen	6	4	.600	2	Semifinal round
5	Formula Shell Zoom Masters	6	4	.600	2	Semifinal round
6	Sta. Lucia Realtors	4	6	.400	4	
7	Pepsi Mega Bottlers	2	8	.200	6	
8	Ginebra San Miguel	0	10	.000	8	

== Semifinal round ==
=== Team standings ===
Overall standings
Pos	Team	W	L	PCT	GB	Qualification
1	Alaska Milkmen	13	5	.722	—	Advance to the Finals
2	San Miguel Beermen	12	6	.667	1	Advance to the Finals
3	Sunkist Orange Juicers	11	7	.611	2	Proceed to third place playoffs
4	Formula Shell Zoom Masters	9	9	.500 (Note: Head-to-head record: Shell 2–1 Purefoods)	4	Proceed to third place playoffs
5	Purefoods Tender Juicy Hotdogs	9	9	.500	4	

Notes:

Semifinal round standings
Pos	Team	W	L
1	Alaska Milkmen	6	2
2	San Miguel Beermen	6	2
3	Sunkist Orange Juicers	3	5
4	Formula Shell Zoom Masters	3	5
5	Purefoods Tender Juicy Hotdogs	2	6

== Third place playoffs ==
Vintage

December 5

Sunkist Orange Juicers 107, Formula Shell Zoom Masters 97

Cuneta Astrodome, Pasay

Vintage

December 8

Sunkist Orange Juicers 107, Formula Shell Zoom Masters 114

Araneta Coliseum, Quezon City

Vintage

December 12

Sunkist Orange Juicers 110, Formula Shell Zoom Masters 92
Sunkist wins series, 2–1

Cuneta Astrodome, Pasay

== Finals ==
Vintage

December 5

Alaska Milkmen 93, San Miguel Beermen 85

Cuneta Astrodome, Pasay

Vintage

December 8

Alaska Milkmen 90, San Miguel Beermen 102

Araneta Coliseum, Quezon City

Vintage

December 10

Alaska Milkmen 110, San Miguel Beermen 96

Cuneta Astrodome, Pasay

Vintage

December 12

Alaska Milkmen 100, San Miguel Beermen 108

Cuneta Astrodome, Pasay

Vintage

December 15

Alaska Milkmen 110, San Miguel Beermen 117 (2OT)

Araneta Coliseum, Quezon City

Vintage

December 17

Alaska Milkmen 94, San Miguel Beermen 86

Cuneta Astrodome, Pasay

Vintage

December 19

Alaska Milkmen 99, San Miguel Beermen 86
Alaska wins series, 4–3

Cuneta Astrodome, Pasay
