= 1995 PBA All-Filipino Cup =

- Duration: February 19 – May 21, 1995
- TV partner(s): Vintage Sports (PTV)

Finals
- Champions: Sunkist Orange Juicers
- Runners-up: Alaska Milkmen

Awards
- Best Player: Vergel Meneses (Sunkist Orange Juicers)

PBA All-Filipino Cup chronology
- < 1994 1996 >

PBA conference chronology
- < 1994 Governors' 1995 Commissioner's >

The 1995 Philippine Basketball Association (PBA) All-Filipino Cup was the first conference of the 1995 PBA season. It started on February 19 and ended on May 21, 1995. The tournament is an All-Filipino format, which doesn't require an import or a pure-foreign player for each team.

== Format ==
The following format will be observed for the duration of the conference:

- The teams were divided into 2 groups.

Group A:

1. Ginebra San Miguel
2. Purefoods TJ Hotdogs
3. Shell Rimula X Turbo Chargers
4. Sunkist Orange Juicers

Group B:

1. Alaska Milkmen
2. Pepsi Mega Bottlers
3. San Miguel Beermen
4. Sta. Lucia Realtors

- Teams in a group will play against each other twice and against teams in the other group once; 10 games per team; Teams are then seeded by basis on win–loss records. Ties are broken among point differentials of the tied teams. Standings will be determined in one league table; teams do not qualify by basis of groupings.
- The top five teams after the eliminations will advance to the semifinals.
- Semifinals will be two round robin affairs with the remaining teams. Results from the elimination round will be carried over. A playoff incentive for a finals berth will be given to the team that will win at least five of their eight semifinal games.
- The top two teams (or the top team and the winner of the playoff incentive) will face each other in a best-of-seven championship series. The next two teams will qualify for a best-of-three playoff for third place.

== Elimination round ==
=== Team standings ===
Pos	Team	W	L	PCT	GB	Qualification
1	Sunkist Orange Juicers	7	3	.700	—	Semifinal round
2	Shell Rimula X Turbo Chargers	6	4	.600	1	Semifinal round
3	Alaska Milkmen	5	5	.500	2	Semifinal round
4	Sta. Lucia Realtors	5	5	.500	2	Semifinal round
5	Purefoods Tender Juicy Hotdogs	5	5	.500	2	Semifinal round
6	San Miguel Beermen	4	6	.400	3	
7	Pepsi Mega Bottlers	4	6	.400	3	
8	Ginebra San Miguel	4	6	.400	3	

== Semifinals ==
=== Team standings ===
Overall standings
Pos	Team	W	L	PCT	GB	Qualification
1	Sunkist Orange Juicers	13	5	.722	—	Advance to the finals (Note: If a team outside the top two teams wins at least five semifinal round games, then it and the second-placed team will playoff for the last finals berth; otherwise, the top 2 teams qualify outright.)
2	Alaska Milkmen	10	8	.556 (Note: Head-to-head record: Alaska 2–1 Purefoods)	3	Guaranteed finals berth playoff
3	Purefoods Tender Juicy Hotdogs	10	8	.556	3	Qualify to finals berth playoff
4	Sta. Lucia Realtors	9	9	.500	4	Proceed to third-place playoffs
5	Shell Rimula X Turbo Chargers	6	12	.333	7	

Notes:

Semifinal round standings
Pos	Team	W	L	Qualification
1	Sunkist Orange Juicers	6	2	
2	Alaska Milkmen	5	3	
3	Purefoods Tender Juicy Hotdogs	5	3	Qualify to finals berth playoff (Note: Sunkist advanced to the finals as #1 seeded team, Alaska qualified to the finals berth playoff as #2 seeded team; finals berth playoff: Alaska 115–89 Purefoods)
4	Sta. Lucia Realtors	4	4	
5	Shell Rimula X Turbo Chargers	0	8	

== Finals berth playoff ==
Vintage

May 5

Alaska Milkmen 115, Purefoods TJ Hotdogs 89

Araneta Coliseum, Quezon City

== Third place playoffs ==
Vintage

May 7

Purefoods TJ Hotdogs 89, Sta. Lucia Realtors 90

Cuneta Astrodome, Pasay

Vintage

May 9

Purefoods TJ Hotdogs 87, Sta. Lucia Realtors 89
Sta.Lucia wins series, 2–0

Cuneta Astrodome, Pasay

== Finals ==
Vintage

May 7

Sunkist Orange Juicers 104, Alaska Milkmen 110

Cuneta Astrodome, Pasay

Vintage

May 9

Sunkist Orange Juicers 92, Alaska Milkmen 85

Cuneta Astrodome, Pasay

Vintage

May 12

Sunkist Orange Juicers 98, Alaska Milkmen 92

Araneta Coliseum, Quezon City

Vintage

May 14

Sunkist Orange Juicers 88, Alaska Milkmen 94

Cuneta Astrodome, Pasay

Vintage

May 16

Sunkist Orange Juicers 95, Alaska Milkmen 90

Cuneta Astrodome, Pasay

Vintage

May 19

Sunkist Orange Juicers 86, Alaska Milkmen 92

Cuneta Astrodome, Pasay

Vintage

May 21

Sunkist Orange Juicers 87, Alaska Milkmen 78 (OT)
Sunkist wins series, 4–3

Cuneta Astrodome, Pasay
