= 1995 PBA Commissioner's Cup =

- Duration: June 9 - September 5, 1995
- TV partner(s): Vintage Sports (PTV)

Finals
- Champions: Sunkist Orange Juicers
- Runners-up: Alaska Milkmen

Awards
- Best Player: Vergel Meneses (Sunkist Orange Juicers)
- Best Import: Ronnie Grandison (Sunkist Orange Juicers)

PBA Commissioner's Cup chronology
- < 1994 1996 >

PBA conference chronology
- < 1995 All-Filipino 1995 Governors' >

The 1995 Philippine Basketball Association (PBA) Commissioner's Cup was the second conference of the 1995 PBA season. It started on June 9 and ended on September 5, 1995. The tournament is an import-laden format, which requires an import or a pure-foreign player for each team.

== Format ==
The following format will be observed for the duration of the conference:

- The teams were divided into 2 groups.

Group A:

1. Alaska Milkmen
2. Ginebra San Miguel
3. San Miguel Beermen
4. Sta. Lucia Realtors

Group B:

1. Pepsi Mega Bottlers
2. Purefoods TJ Hotdogs
3. Formula Shell Gas Kings
4. Sunkist Orange Juicers

- Teams in a group will play against each other twice and against teams in the other group once; 10 games per team; Teams are then seeded by basis on win–loss records. Ties are broken among point differentials of the tied teams. Standings will be determined in one league table; teams do not qualify by basis of groupings.
- The top six teams after the eliminations will advance to the quarterfinals.
- Quarterfinals will be a single round robin affairs with the remaining teams. Results from the elimination round will be carried over.
- The top four teams will advance to a best-of-five semifinal round.
  - SF1: #1 vs. #4
  - SF2: #2 vs. #3
- Best-of-three third-place playoff: losers of the semifinals
- Best-of-seven finals: winners of the semifinals

== Elimination round ==
=== Team standings ===
Pos	Team	W	L	PCT	GB	Qualification
1	Sunkist Orange Juicers	9	1	.900	—	Quarterfinal round
2	Sta. Lucia Realtors	8	2	.800	1	Quarterfinal round
3	Alaska Milkmen	7	3	.700	2	Quarterfinal round
4	Purefoods Tender Juicy Hotdogs	6	4	.600	3	Quarterfinal round
5	San Miguel Beermen	6	4	.600	3	Quarterfinal round
6	Formula Shell Gas Kings	2	8	.200	7	Quarterfinal round
7	Pepsi Mega Bottlers	1	9	.100	8	
8	Ginebra San Miguel	1	9	.100	8	

== Quarterfinal round ==
=== Team standings ===
Pos	Team	W	L	PCT	GB	Qualification
1	Sunkist Orange Juicers	12	3	.800	—	Semifinals
2	Sta. Lucia Realtors	10	5	.667 (Note: Head-to-head record: Sta. Lucia 3–0 Alaska)	2	Semifinals
3	Alaska Milkmen	10	5	.667	2	Semifinals
4	Purefoods Tender Juicy Hotdogs	9	6	.600	3	Semifinals
5	San Miguel Beermen	8	7	.533	4	
6	Formula Shell Gas Kings	4	11	.267	8	

== Bracket ==
Semifinals (Best-of-5)
1	Sunkist	3
4	Purefoods	2
2	Sta. Lucia	0
3	Alaska	3

Finals (Best-of-7)
1	Sunkist	4
3	Alaska	2
Third place playoffs (Best-of-3)
4	Purefoods	0
2	Sta. Lucia	2

== Semifinals ==
=== (1) Sunkist vs. (4) Purefoods ===
Vintage

August 11

Sunkist Orange Juicers 85, Purefoods TJ Hotdogs 83

Araneta Coliseum, Quezon City

Vintage

August 13

Sunkist Orange Juicers 85, Purefoods TJ Hotdogs 92

Cuneta Astrodome, Pasay

Vintage

August 15

Sunkist Orange Juicers 100, Purefoods TJ Hotdogs 97

Cuneta Astrodome, Pasay

Vintage

August 18

recap

Sunkist Orange Juicers 80, Purefoods TJ Hotdogs 101

Araneta Coliseum, Quezon City

Vintage

August 20

recap

Sunkist Orange Juicers 105, Purefoods TJ Hotdogs 99
Sunkist wins series, 3–2

Cuneta Astrodome, Pasay

=== (2) Sta. Lucia vs. (3) Alaska ===
Vintage

August 11

recap

Sta. Lucia Realtors 91, Alaska Milkmen 107

Araneta Coliseum, Quezon City

Vintage

August 13

Sta. Lucia Realtors 110, Alaska Milkmen 114

Cuneta Astrodome, Pasay

Vintage

August 15

Sta. Lucia Realtors 94, Alaska Milkmen 99
Alaska wins series, 3–0

Cuneta Astrodome, Pasay

== Third place playoffs ==
Vintage

August 25

Sta. Lucia Realtors 99, Purefoods TJ Hotdogs 88

Cuneta Astrodome, Pasay

Vintage

August 27

Sta. Lucia Realtors 101, Purefoods TJ Hotdogs 89
Sta. Lucia wins series, 2–0

Cuneta Astrodome, Pasay

== Finals ==
Vintage

August 25

Sunkist Orange Juicers 112, Alaska Milkmen 106 (OT)

Cuneta Astrodome, Pasay

Vintage

August 27

Sunkist Orange Juicers 99, Alaska Milkmen 105

Cuneta Astrodome, Pasay

Vintage

August 29

Sunkist Orange Juicers 99, Alaska Milkmen 87

Araneta Coliseum, Quezon City

Vintage

September 1

Sunkist Orange Juicers 95, Alaska Milkmen 93

Araneta Coliseum, Quezon City

Vintage

September 3

Sunkist Orange Juicers 93, Alaska Milkmen 114

Cuneta Astrodome, Pasay

Vintage

September 5

Sunkist Orange Juicers 106, Alaska Milkmen 87
Sunkist wins series, 4–2

Cuneta Astrodome, Pasay
