= Boybits Victoria =

Filipino basketball player (died 2023)

Personal information
- Born: May 9, 1972
- Died: March 1, 2023 (aged 50) Pasay, Philippines

Career information
- High school: San Beda (Manila)
- College: San Beda
- PBA draft: 1994: 1st round, 3rd overall pick
- Drafted by: Swift Mighty Meaties
- Playing career: 1994–2001
- Position: Point guard

Career history

Playing
- 1994–1998: Swift Mighty Meaties / Sunkist Orange Juicers / Pop Cola Bottlers
- 1999–2001: San Miguel Beermen

Coaching
- 2004–2006: San Miguel Beermen (assistant)

Career highlights
- As player: 7× PBA champion (1995 All-Filipino, 1995 Commissioner's, 1999 Commissioner's, 1999 Governors', 2000 Commissioner's, 2000 Governors', 2001 All-Filipino); PBA Rookie of the Year (1994); PBA Mr. Quality Minutes (2000); As assistant coach: PBA champion (2005 Fiesta)

Emmanuel "Boybits" Victoria Jr. (1972/1973 – March 1, 2023) was a Filipino professional basketball player.

== Career ==
Victoria played for the RFM and San Miguel franchise teams when he was plying in the Philippine Basketball Association (PBA). Prior to entering the PBA, he was a player for the San Beda Red Lions in college.

=== Swift and Sunkist ===
Victoria entered the PBA through the 1994 draft where he was selected by the RFM franchise team, then-named the Swift Mighty Meaties (later Sunkist Orange Juicers/Bottlers), as the third overall pick. He helped the team clinch the 1995 All-Filipino and Commissioner's Cup titles.

Due to poor relations with coach Norman Black, Victoria forced the team (now the Pop Cola Bottlers) to trade him to another team.

=== San Miguel ===
Victoria was acquired by the San Miguel Beermen in 1998 under coach Jong Uichico, where he fulfilled the role as backup to Olsen Racela. He was part of the team until 2001. During his stay, San Miguel clinched five PBA titles.

== PBA career statistics ==
Legend
GP	Games played	MPG	Minutes per game
FG%	Field-goal percentage	3P%	3-point field-goal percentage	FT%	Free-throw percentage
RPG	Rebounds per game	APG	Assists per game	SPG	Steals per game
BPG	Blocks per game	PPG	Points per game	**Bold**	Career high

=== Season-by-season averages ===
Year	Team	GP	MPG	FG%	3P%	FT%	RPG	APG	SPG	BPG	PPG
1994	Swift	71	24.8	.445	.315	.804	2.0	2.9	**1.0**	**.4**	9.9
1995	Sunkist	**72**	29.1	**.448**	**.380**	.851	2.3	4.3	.8	**.4**	9.4
1996	Sunkist	27	30.9	.356	.302	.645	3.0	4.7	.7	.2	9.5
1997	Pop Cola	38	**31.6**	.388	.302	.744	**3.7**	**5.4**	.8	.3	**10.3**
1998	Pop Cola	48	25.5	.367	.324	.755	2.6	3.7	.9	.3	8.3
1999	San Miguel	54	19.4	.333	.296	.714	1.9	2.0	.6	.1	5.8
2000	San Miguel	58	15.9	.375	.360	.651	1.7	1.6	.6	.1	6.3
2001	San Miguel	57	13.1	.287	.270	**.861**	1.4	1.2	.3	.0	4.0
Career		425	23.1	.388	.321	.767	2.2	3.1	.7	.2	7.8

== Later life and death ==
Victoria turned to coaching and later as an analyst of PBA games for radio and television broadcast. He also became head of sales of Victoria Sports, a Quezon City-based indoor sports club.

In 2009, he ran for councilor in the 1st District of Taguig in the 2010 elections under the Nacionalista Party, but lost.

Victoria was diagnosed with a Guillain–Barré syndrome, an autoimmune disorder, in 2018. His condition improved after spending weeks confined in a hospital. He suffered a heart attack on February 14, 2023, and he was discovered to have an acute myocardial infarction. Victoria died on March 1, 2023, after another heart attack while at the San Juan de Dios Hospital in Pasay, Philippines. He was 50.
