= Kenneth Duremdes =

Filipino basketball player and MPBL president

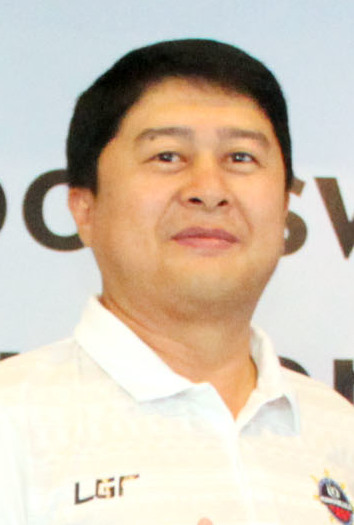
- Duremdes in 2019

President of the MPBL
- Incumbent
- Assumed office January 17, 2026

2nd Commissioner of the MPBL
- In office November 22, 2017 – January 17, 2026
- Preceded by: Snow Badua
- Succeeded by: Emmerson Oreta

Personal details
- Born: Kenneth Celera Duremdes; January 31, 1974 (age 52) Koronadal, South Cotabato, Philippines
- Education: Adamson University
- Basketball career

Personal information
- Listed height: 6 ft 3 in (1.91 m)
- Listed weight: 190 lb (86 kg)

Career information
- College: Adamson
- PBA draft: 1995: 1st round, 3rd overall pick
- Drafted by: Sunkist Orange Juicers
- Playing career: 1995–2008
- Position: Shooting guard / small forward
- Number: 19
- Coaching career: 2008–2014

Career history

Playing
- 1995–1997: Sunkist Orange Juicers
- 1997–2002: Alaska Aces
- 2003–2007: Sta. Lucia Realtors
- 2007–2008: Coca-Cola Tigers

Coaching
- 2007–2008: Powerade Tigers (assistant)
- 2008–2009: Powerade Tigers
- 2012–2013: Adamson (assistant)
- 2014: Adamson

Career highlights
- 6× PBA champion (1995 All-Filipino, 1995 Commissioner's, 1997 Governors', 1998 All-Filipino, 1998 Commissioner's, 2000 All-Filipino); 2× PBA Finals MVP (1998 All-Filipino, 1998 Commissioner's); PBA Most Valuable Player (1998); 2× PBA Best Player of the Conference (1998 Commissioner's, 2000 All-Filipino); 9× PBA All-Star (1995–2001, 2003, 2004); PBA All-Star Game MVP (1996); 2× PBA Mythical First Team (1998, 2000); 3× PBA Mythical Second Team (1996, 1999, 2001); PBA Two-Ball Competition Co-Champion (w/ Johnny Abarrientos) (1999); 50 Greatest Players in PBA History (2000 selection)
Medals
Men's basketball
Representing Philippines
Asian Games
Bronze medal – third place	1998 Bangkok	Team
William Jones Cup
Gold medal – first place	1998 Taipei	Team

Kenneth Celera Duremdes (born January 31, 1974) is a Filipino retired professional basketball player who serves as the president of the Maharlika Pilipinas Basketball League (MPBL). Nicknamed as "Captain Marbel", Duremdes played in the Philippine Basketball Association (PBA) from 1995 to 2008. He is a six-time PBA champion, a two-time Finals MVP, a one-time MVP in 1998, and a former member of the Philippine national basketball team.

== Amateur career ==
Duremdes played for Adamson University in the UAAP during the mid-90s and was touted as one of the future PBA superstars. He also played in the Philippine Basketball League where he had solid credentials.

One of Adamson University's greatest players, Duremdes immediately gave basketball fans a glimpse of his talent, earning Rookie of the Year honors with Burger Machine back in 1993 in the PBL.

Under the tutelage of coach Perry Ronquillo, Duremdes turned from a raw cager into a fearless slasher, and was instrumental in giving Burger Machine a championship in 1994. After two years with the PBL, Duremdes moved on to the PBA and was picked third overall in the 1995 draft.

== PBA career ==
=== Sunkist and Pop Cola ===
In 1995, Duremdes was selected by the Sunkist Orange Juicers as the 3rd overall in the rookie draft. His team won the PBA All-Filipino and the PBA Commissioner's Cup conference titles despite playing a limited role behind 1995 MVP Vergel Meneses, Bonel Balingit, Nelson Asaytono and Boybits Victoria.

However, Duremdes was on the bench for most of his time with the then-renamed Pop Cola 800s despite the departure of Asaytono from the team. After languishing on the bench, Pop Cola traded him and Jack Tanuan to Alaska for Dwight Lago and Boyet Fernandez.

=== Alaska Milkmen ===
After his arrival with the 1996 Grandslam champions, Duremdes' career took a big rise. He had a strong showing with the Milkmen's Governors Cup title conquest of Purefoods.

In 1998, Duremdes led Alaska to the All-Filipino and Commissioner's Cup titles during the said year. He also won the Commissioner's Cup Best Player honors. Before leading the Philippines to a bronze-medal finish in the 1998 Asian Games in Bangkok, Duremdes was named as the league's Most Valuable Player at age 24.

He continued to have MVP numbers from 1999–2000, in which he led the Milkmen to the 2000 All-Filipino title. After becoming a free agent, he signed a reported 48 million peso to stay with the Aces in 2001, despite offers from teams such as the Mobiline Phone Pals. With Alaska focusing itself on rebuilding the team, Duremdes became the top man for the Aces along with young players John Arigo and Ali Peek. In 2002, he again played for the country in the Busan Asian Games, becoming one of the most notable players on the squad. However, the squad failed to win a medal in the said event. Duremdes then led Alaska to a runner-up finish in the season-ending All-Filipino Conference.

In 2000, he became a member of the PBA's 25 Greatest Player's List, the youngest of the group.

=== Sta. Lucia Realtors ===
In 2003, Duremdes was surprisingly traded from Alaska to the Sta. Lucia Realtors for a future first round pick (which turned out to be Brandon Cablay). The trade stunned everyone in attendance and made the Realtors one of the formidable contenders to win a PBA crown with the trio of Duremdes, Marlou Aquino and Dennis Espino. Despite big numbers in his first season with Sta. Lucia, he failed to lead the squad to a single championship. However, in the 2003 All-Star Game, he led the Commissioner's All-Star in a win over the Governor's team after scoring a buzzer-beating layup in the final seconds.

Injuries hampered Duremdes in the 2004 Fiesta Conference but he still played in the All-Star Game. He only played for 47 games that year as several nagging injuries affected him. Duremdes saw action in the TM Legends Game, pitting several members of the PBA's 25 Greatest Players. In the 2005-2006 season, Duremdes saw limited action due to injuries, as well as his limited playing minutes. In last Philippine Cup, he led all scorers with 22 points-per-game.

=== Coca-Cola Tigers ===
In 2007, Duremdes was traded to Coca-Cola along with Alex Cabagnot and Ricky Calimag for Manny Ramos and Dennis Miranda. And in 2008, he was named as the head coach of the Coca-Cola Tigers, ending his career as a basketball player.

On March 23, 2012, before a game between Alaska and Powerade, the Tigers retired his jersey. They went on to lose to the Aces in overtime, 102–100, despite having a 16-point lead.

== Coaching career ==
Duremdes was hired by his college alma mater Adamson University as the head coach of its basketball team, replacing Leo Austria, who decided not to renew his contract with the Falcons. The team manager of the Adamson Falcons confirmed the choice of Duremdes as the Falcons' new head coach. Following a dismal campaign in Season 77 (finished 8th in the standings, 1-13 win–loss record), Duremdes was fired by the team management citing a "need for full-time mentor" for the young Falcon team. He was replaced by one of his assistants, Michael A. Fermin who played for UP Fighting Maroons in the early 1990s.

== National team career ==
In 1994, he was included in the national team that played in the Hiroshima Asian Games.

In 1998, Duremdes was again named to the Philippine Centennial Team for the Bangkok Asian Games. He had outstanding numbers against teams from Asia and led the country to a bronze-medal finish. The country also won the Jones Cup in Taiwan the same year. He led all scorers in the 1998 Asian Games and the 1998 Jones cup averaging 11.9 point per game and 17.3 point per game, respectively.

In 2002, Duremdes once again took part in the national team that played in the Busan Asian Games.

== PBA career statistics ==
Legend
GP	Games played	MPG	Minutes per game
FG%	Field-goal percentage	3P%	3-point field-goal percentage	FT%	Free-throw percentage
RPG	Rebounds per game	APG	Assists per game	SPG	Steals per game
BPG	Blocks per game	PPG	Points per game	**Bold**	Career high

=== Season-by-season averages ===
Year	Team	GP	MPG	FG%	3P%	FT%	RPG	APG	SPG	BPG	PPG
1995	Sunkist	**65**	17.9	.482	.244	.716	1.9	1.4	.2	.4	8.0
1996	Sunkist	37	19.2	.453	.320	.671	2.0	1.4	.3	.4	8.5
1997	Pop Cola	46	22.5	.470	.237	.663	2.8	1.5	.3	.6	10.3
1997	Alaska	46	22.5	.470	.237	.663	2.8	1.5	.3	.6	10.3
1998	Alaska	51	38.4	**.496**	**.417**	.738	5.1	3.3	.6	**1.1**	15.7
1999	Alaska	56	39.0	.466	.299	.821	5.1	3.5	.7	**1.1**	16.6
2000	Alaska	49	38.1	.469	.331	**.855**	5.8	**5.8**	.7	.8	16.3
2001	Alaska	46	**39.4**	.431	.326	.778	5.5	5.5	.5	.3	16.6
2002	Alaska	16	33.0	.438	.329	.763	4.6	4.9	**1.3**	.6	14.6
2003	Sta. Lucia	37	38.6	.424	.347	.776	**7.4**	3.6	.8	.8	**19.8**
2004–05	Sta. Lucia	47	33.0	.402	.290	.750	5.3	3.1	.7	.7	16.5
2005–06	Sta. Lucia	21	24.0	.465	.406	.720	3.5	3.3	.3	.6	13.0
2006–07	Sta. Lucia	41	18.4	.402	.350	.696	2.8	1.7	.3	.3	8.7
2006–07	Coca-Cola	41	18.4	.402	.350	.696	2.8	1.7	.3	.3	8.7
2007–08	Coca-Cola	15	17.6	.385	.211	.750	2.5	1.7	.2	.1	6.6
Career		527	29.9	.450	.326	.759	4.2	3.1	.5	.6	13.4

== Achievements ==
=== Philippine Basketball Association ===
- 1998 and 2000 Mythical First Team
- 1998 Most Valuable Player
- 1996, 1999 and 2001 Mythical Second Team
- 1998 Commissioner's Cup Best Player of the Conference
- 1998 All-Filipino Cup and 1998 Commissioner's Cup Finals Most Valuable Player
- 2000 All-Filipino Cup Best Player of the Conference
- 1996 All-Star Game Most Valuable Player
- 9-time All-Star
- PBA's 500 Three-Point Club Member
- PBA's 25 Greatest Players Member

=== Philippine Basketball League ===
- PBL's 20 Greatest Players Member
- 1993 Most Valuable Player

=== Philippine national team ===
- 1998 Asian Games Bronze Medalist
- 1998 Jones Cup Champion Centennial Team

== Coaching record ==
=== UAAP ===
Season	Team	GP	W	L	PCT	Finish	PG	PW	PL	PCT	Results
2014	AdU	14	1	13	.071	8th	–	–	–	–	Eliminated
Totals		14	1	13	.071		0	0	0	.000	0 championships

=== PBA ===
Season	Team	Conference	GP	W	L	PCT	Finish	GP	W	L	PCT	Results
2008–09	Coke	Philippine Cup	18	7	11	.389	9th	1	0	1	.000	Lost in wildcard round
2008–09	Coke	Fiesta	14	6	8	.429	8th	1	0	1	.000	Lost in wildcard round
2009–10	Coke	Philippine Cup	9	1	8	.111	–	–	–	–	–	(Replaced)
Career Total			41	14	27	.341	Playoff Total	2	0	2	.000	0 championships

== Personal life ==
Kenneth Duremdes married Vanessa Cariaga in 1993 at the Manila City Hall, and the ceremony was officiated by Reverend Jesus Mesa before witnesses Manolita San Luis and Nora Atienzo. Duremdes contracted a second marriage with Theresa Ibasco in 1996. Cariaga filed a bigamy lawsuit against him. Thereafter, he filed an annulment of marriage case which was later dismissed by a Quezon City regional trial court, Branch 255. The ruling was affirmed on October 21, 2008, by the Philippine Court of Appeals' 9th division.

In November 2017, Duremdes was named commissioner of the upstart Maharlika Pilipinas Basketball League, succeeding Snow Badua, where he would since oversee the league's first seven seasons of play from 2018 to 2025. On January 17, 2026, he was promoted to league president, with Emmerson Oreta succeeding Duremdes as league commissioner.
