= Victor Pablo =

Filipino basketball player

UP Fighting Maroons
- Title: Assistant coach
- League: UAAP

Personal information
- Born: August 8, 1970 (age 56)
- Listed height: 6 ft 4 in (1.93 m)
- Listed weight: 200 lb (91 kg)

Career information
- College: FEU
- PBA draft: 1993: 1st round, 2nd overall pick
- Drafted by: Ginebra San Miguel
- Playing career: 1993–2008
- Position: Small forward
- Number: 33
- Coaching career: 2011–present

Career history

Playing
- 1993–1994: Pepsi Mega Bottlers
- 1995: San Miguel Beermen
- 1995–1999: Formula Shell Zoom Masters
- 2000–2007: Talk 'N Text Tropang Texters
- 2008: Barangay Ginebra Kings

Coaching
- 2011–2026: FEU (assistant)
- 2026–present: UP (assistant)

Career highlights
- 4× PBA champion (1998 Governors', 1999 All-Filipino, 2003 All-Filipino, 2008 Fiesta); 4× PBA All-Star (1993, 1994, 1998, 1999); PBA Mythical First Team (2002); PBA Mythical Second Team (1998); PBA Slam Dunk Champion (1994)

Victor Pablo (born August 8, 1970) is a retired Filipino professional basketball player in the Philippine Basketball Association (PBA).

== Playing career ==
A former king Tamaraw at Far Eastern University, Pablo was the second overall pick in the 1993 PBA draft. He was drafted by Ginebra San Miguel but failed to reach an agreement with the Gins and was subsequently traded to Pepsi in exchange for center Manny Victorino. At Pepsi, he rejoined coach Derrick Pumaren, his former coach at Triple-V Foodmasters during his PBL days.

After two seasons with the Mega Bottlers, Pablo would be involved in two trades in the 1995 PBA season, first with Alvin Teng, whom San Miguel dealt to Pepsi to acquire Pablo and towards the end of the 1995 PBA Governors' Cup eliminations, he was traded by the Beermen to Formula Shell for Paul Alvarez.

In 1998, Pablo was one of the final cuts in coach Tim Cone's Philippine Centennial Team. Vic made up for the non-inclusion to the Asian Games squad by having an outstanding season with Formula Shell. He earned his first PBA championship in a six-year career when Shell won the season-ending Governors Cup.

He was traded to Mobiline Phone Pals for Mark Telan at the beginning of the new millennium. In 2003, finally free from injuries, Pablo stepped up big and helped the Phone Pals win their first title in the All-Filipino Cup Championship.

Pablo was later on traded to Barangay Ginebra Kings in 2008, where he finally got to play for the team that drafted him. He won a championship ring for the Kings during the Fiesta Conference. After his one season stint w/ Ginebra, he decided to call it quits.

== Coaching career ==
Pablo later served as one of the assistant coaches for the FEU Tamaraws.

== Personal life ==
His daughter, Ira, worked as a courtside reporter for PBA in 2022.

== PBA career statistics ==
Legend
| GP | Games played | MPG | Minutes per game |
| FG% | Field-goal percentage | 3P% | 3-point field-goal percentage | FT% | Free-throw percentage |
| RPG | Rebounds per game | APG | Assists per game | SPG | Steals per game |
| BPG | Blocks per game | PPG | Points per game | **Bold** | Career high |

=== Season-by-season averages ===
| Year | Team | GP | MPG | FG% | 3P% | FT% | RPG | APG | SPG | BPG | PPG |
|---|---|---|---|---|---|---|---|---|---|---|---|
| 1993 | 7-Up / Pepsi | 43 | 34.0 | .494 | .222 | .810 | 6.6 | 1.3 | .1 | .7 | 13.5 |
| 1994 | Pepsi | 38 | 29.4 | **.511** | .318 | .715 | 4.8 | 1.1 | .1 | .3 | 13.2 |
| 1995 | San Miguel | 33 | 20.8 | .493 | .286 | .703 | 3.4 | .9 | .0 | .5 | 9.4 |
| 1995 | Formula Shell | 13 | 29.7 | .445 | .400 | .733 | 5.3 | 1.2 | .2 | .2 | 9.4 |
| 1996 | Formula Shell | 63 | 31.0 | .487 | .000 | .756 | 5.8 | 1.3 | .2 | .6 | 12.1 |
| 1997 | Formula Shell | 46 | 39.5 | .473 | .125 | .812 | 7.2 | 2.6 | **.4** | .7 | 17.4 |
| 1998 | Formula Shell | 61 | 32.4 | .469 | .357 | .771 | 5.7 | 2.0 | .3 | **.8** | 11.6 |
| 1999 | Formula Shell / Shell | 55 | **40.3** | .454 | .304 | .793 | 6.1 | 1.7 | .2 | **.8** | 15.3 |
| 2000 | Mobiline | 24 | — | .435 | .361 | .777 | **9.9** | **2.8** | .3 | .7 | **19.8** |
| 2001 | Mobiline / Talk 'N Text | 31 | 33.0 | .403 | .204 | .750 | 4.7 | 1.5 | .2 | .6 | 9.7 |
| 2002 | Talk 'N Text | 47 | 23.1 | .412 | **.452** | .737 | 4.8 | 1.1 | .2 | .4 | 8.1 |
| 2003 | Talk 'N Text | 46 | 26.7 | .394 | .321 | .768 | 4.5 | 1.5 | **.4** | .6 | 9.2 |
| 2004–05 | Talk 'N Text | **75** | 31.2 | .451 | .324 | .804 | 6.4 | .9 | .2 | .2 | 11.4 |
| 2005–06 | Talk 'N Text | 33 | 22.4 | .428 | .383 | .722 | 3.2 | .8 | .2 | .2 | 8.9 |
| 2006–07 | Talk 'N Text | 43 | 12.2 | .339 | .250 | **.889** | 1.9 | .5 | .0 | .2 | 2.4 |
| 2007–08 | Barangay Ginebra | 10 | 7.9 | .391 | .250 | — | 1.8 | .2 | .0 | .0 | 2.0 |
| Career | | 661 | 30.2 | .457 | .330 | .771 | 5.3 | 1.4 | .2 | .5 | 11.3 |
