= Gabby Velasco =

Filipino basketball coach

Career information
- College: De La Salle
- Coaching career: 1989–2022

Career history

Coaching
- 1989–1991: De La Salle (assistant)
- 1990–1994: Pepsi Mega (assistant)
- 1992: De La Salle
- 1994–1997: Sunkist Orange Bottlers (assistant)
- 1998–1999: Welcoat Paints
- 1998–2012: St. Francis
- 2013–2016: Benilde
- 2018–2019: CEU (assistant)
- 2021–2022: De La Salle (assistant)

Career highlights
- As head coach: 5x NCRAA champions (2000, 2001, 2002, 2003, 2005); As assistant coach: 2x PBA champion (1995 All-Filipino, 1995 Commissioner's); 2x UAAP champion (1989, 1990)

Gabby Velasco is a Filipino former professional basketball coach.

== Career ==
Velasco was notable working alongside Derrick Pumaren as his assistant, and he played for him when La Salle is still in NCAA in 1986. They worked together on La Salle, Pepsi Mega and Sunkist, when they almost won a Grand Slam in 1995.

He coached La Salle in 1992, Saint Francis of Assisi College from 1998 to 2012, when they won five championship. Some of the championships are led by De Ocampo brothers (Ranidel and Yancy).

He then coached the Benilde Blazers, but his former success did not repeat. Then, he reunited with Pumaren in CEU Scorpions as an assistant again. He returned again in La Salle in Pumaren's return until 2022.

== Coaching record ==
=== Collegiate record ===
Season	Team	Eliminations					Playoffs				
Season	Team	GP	W	L	PCT	Finish	GP	W	L	PCT	Results
1992	DLSU	14	11	3	.786	3rd	—	—	—	—	Eliminated
2013	CSB	18	5	13	.278	9th	—	—	—	—	Eliminated
2014	CSB	18	11	7	.611	5th	—	—	—	—	Eliminated
2015	CSB	18	5	13	.278	8th	—	—	—	—	Eliminated
2016	CSB	18	1	17	.056	10th	—	—	—	—	Eliminated
Totals		86	33	53	.425	—	0	0	0	.000	0 championships
