= 1995 PBA Governors' Cup finals =

Basketball competition in the Philippines

1995 PBA Governors Cup finals
| Team | Coach | Wins |
|---|---|---|
| Alaska Milkmen | Tim Cone | 4 |
| San Miguel Beermen | Norman Black | 3 |
- Dates: December 5–19, 1995
- Television: Vintage Sports (PTV)
- Radio network: DZRH

PBA Governors Cup finals chronology
- < 1994 1996 >

PBA finals chronology
- < 1995 Commissioner's 1996 All-Filipino >

The 1995 PBA Governors Cup finals was the best-of-7 championship series of the 1995 PBA Governors Cup and the conclusion of the conference's playoffs. The San Miguel Beermen and the Alaska Milkmen played for the 62nd championship contested by the league.

The Alaska Milkmen retains the Governor's Cup title and ending frustrations of two bridesmaid finishes during the season, defeating the San Miguel Beermen in a seven-game series, winning the last two games.

== Qualification ==
| Alaska | | San Miguel |
|---|---|---|
| Finished 7–3 (.700), tied for 2nd | Eliminations | Finished 6–4 (.600), tied for 3rd |
| Finished 13–5 (.722), 1st | Semifinals | Finished 12–6 (.667), 2nd |

== Series scoring summary ==
| Team | Game 1 | Game 2 | Game 3 | Game 4 | Game 5 | Game 6 | Game 7 | Wins |
|---|---|---|---|---|---|---|---|---|
| Alaska | 93 | 90 | 110 | 100 | 110 | 94 | 99 | 4 |
| San Miguel | 85 | 102 | 96 | 108 | 117 | 86 | 86 | 3 |
| Venue | Cuneta | Araneta | Cuneta | Cuneta | Araneta | Cuneta | Cuneta |

== Games summary ==
=== Game 1 ===
Vintage

December 5

recap

Alaska Milkmen 93, San Miguel Beermen 85
| Pts: Sean Chambers 25 | Pts: Kenny Travis 37 |
Alaska leads series, 1–0

Cuneta Astrodome, Pasay

Alaska outscored San Miguel, 25 to 13 in the final period. Allan Caidic buried his only triple for the game to move the Beermen ahead, 75–69, but the Milkmen countered with a 10–0 run to put them on top, 79–75. Sean Chambers led Alaska with 25 points and his defense on Caidic held the triggerman to just five points on a 2-of-9 shooting.

=== Game 2 ===
Vintage

December 8

recap

Alaska Milkmen 90, San Miguel Beermen 102
| Pts: Sean Chambers 23 | Pts: Kenny Travis 43 |
Series tied, 1–1

Araneta Coliseum, Quezon City

Paul Alvarez teamed up with Gido Babilonia in a crucial 7–2 run that snapped the final 88-all tie. Alvarez led the Beermen's rally from nine points down in the third quarter. Alaska scored just 12 points in the fourth quarter as Sean Chambers was held scoreless by the hustling San Miguel defense.

=== Game 3 ===
Vintage

December 10

recap

Alaska Milkmen 110, San Miguel Beermen 96
| Pts: Sean Chambers 38 | Pts: Kenny Travis 21 Allan Caidic 21 |
Alaska leads series, 2–1

Cuneta Astrodome, Pasay

Alaska exploited every fumble, error and missed San Miguel committed in the third quarter to fuel a breakaway and rout the Beermen. The Milkmen led by as many as 34 points midway in the fourth quarter.

=== Game 4 ===
Vintage

December 12

recap

Alaska Milkmen 100, San Miguel Beermen 108
| Pts: Bong Hawkins 27 | Pts: Kenny Travis 34 Allan Caidic 28 |
Series tied, 2–2

Cuneta Astrodome, Pasay

Allan Caidic played his best game of the series, poured in 28 points and fired three of his six three-pointers in the third period, a short jumper by Paul Alvarez gave the Beermen its biggest lead, 99–84 with 7:33 remaining.

=== Game 5 ===
Vintage

December 15

recap

Alaska Milkmen 110, San Miguel Beermen 117 (2OT)
| Pts: Sean Chambers 25 | Pts: Kenny Travis 48 Allan Caidic 33 |
San Miguel leads series, 3–2

Araneta Coliseum, Quezon City

Kenny Travis scored nine of his 48 points in the second overtime, Travis snapped the final tie at 110-all with his seventh triple with 1:07 left and gave San Miguel the lead for good. The Beermen missed two chances of putting away the Milkmen in regulation and the first extra period. Sean Chambers follow up on Abarrientos layup with 8.7 seconds left in regulation tied the game at 94-all, Jojo Lastimosa's triple with 31 seconds left in the first overtime tied it again at 103-all.

=== Game 6 ===
Vintage

December 17

recap

Alaska Milkmen 94, San Miguel Beermen 86
| Pts: Sean Chambers 35 | Pts: Kenny Travis 36 |
Series tied, 3–3

Cuneta Astrodome, Pasay

Alaska rallied from 16 points down in the first half and from a 41–53 halftime deficit. The Milkmen outscored the Beermen, 28–10 in the third quarter to take a 69–63 lead going into the final 12 minutes. Jojo Lastimosa and Jeffrey Cariaso combined for 13 points that broke a 74-all deadlock and gave the Milkmen their biggest lead, 90–79, with time down to 1:37.

=== Game 7 ===
Vintage

December 19

recap

Alaska Milkmen 99, San Miguel Beermen 86
Scoring by quarter: 31–22, 19–23, 20–24, 29–17
| Pts: Sean Chambers 28 | Pts: Kenny Travis 27 |
Alaska wins series, 4–3.

Cuneta Astrodome, Pasay

Alaska trailed by four points, the last at 75–79 with eight minutes to go in the final quarter when they held the Beermen to a single free throw for five minutes to put the game away, Jojo Lastimosa bury a triple as the Milkmen regain the upper hand at 80–79, jumpers from the right flank by Bong Hawkins and Johnny Abarrientos gave Alaska an 89–80 lead with 1:36 left.

1995 PBA Governors Cup Champions

Alaska Milkmen
Third title

== Rosters ==
Alaska Milkmen roster
Players

| Pos. | # | POB | Name | Height | Weight | DOB (YYYY–MM–DD) | From |
|---|---|---|---|---|---|---|---|
| G/F | 4 | (Philippines) | Merwin Castelo | 6 ft 2 in (1.88 m) | | | San Beda |
| G | 5 | (Philippines) | Gilbert Reyes | 5 ft 8 in (1.73 m) | | | Ateneo |
| G/F | 6 | (Philippines) | Jojo Lastimosa (C) | 6 ft 1 in (1.85 m) | | | USJ–R |
| G | 7 | (Philippines) | Roehl Gomez | 6 ft 0 in (1.83 m) | | | Cebu |
| C | 12 | (Philippines) | Dickie Bachmann | 6 ft 5 in (1.96 m) | | | De La Salle |
| G | 14 | (Philippines) | Johnny Abarrientos | 5 ft 8 in (1.73 m) | | | Far Eastern |
| F | 16 | (Philippines) | Bong Hawkins | 6 ft 3 in (1.91 m) | | | UPHSD |
| F | 20 | (United States) | Sean Chambers (I) | 6 ft 1 in (1.85 m) | | | Cal Poly |
| G/F | 22 | (Philippines) | Jeffrey Cariaso | 6 ft 2 in (1.88 m) | | | Sonoma State |
| C | 24 | (Philippines) | Cris Bolado | 6 ft 7 in (2.01 m) | | | National-U |
| F/C | 31 | (Philippines) | Giovanni Pineda | 6 ft 6 in (1.98 m) | | | Adamson |
| C | 32 | (Philippines) | Poch Juinio | 6 ft 5 in (1.96 m) | | | Philippines |
| C | 50 | (Philippines) | Alex Araneta | 6 ft 6 in (1.98 m) | | | Ateneo |
| F | 54 | (Philippines) | Dondon Ampalayo | 6 ft 3 in (1.91 m) | | | USJ–R |

Coaches
Head coach
- (United States) Tim Cone
Assistant(s)
- (Philippines) Joel Banal
- (Philippines) Aric del Rosario

Legend
- (DP) Unsigned draft pick
- (FA) Free agent
- (S) Suspended
- (I) Import
- Injured

San Miguel Beermen roster
Players

| Pos. | # | POB | Name | Height | Weight | DOB (YYYY–MM–DD) | From |
|---|---|---|---|---|---|---|---|
| G | 5 | (Philippines) | Franz Pumaren | 5 ft 9 in (1.75 m) | | | De La Salle |
| G | 6 | (Philippines) | Ato Agustin | 5 ft 11 in (1.80 m) | | | Lyceum |
| G | 7 | (Philippines) | Mike Mustre | 6 ft 0 in (1.83 m) | | | Letran |
| F | 8 | (Philippines) | Allan Caidic | 6 ft 2 in (1.88 m) | | | UE |
| C | 10 | (Philippines) | Adriano Polistico | 6 ft 7 in (2.01 m) | | | Letran |
| G | 11 | (Philippines) | Matthew Makalintal | 5 ft 9 in (1.75 m) | | | St. Benilde |
| F | 12 | (Philippines) | Yves Dignadice | 6 ft 4 in (1.93 m) | | | STI WNU |
| C | 15 | (Philippines) | Bryant Punzalan | 6 ft 6 in (1.98 m) | | | Far Eastern |
| G | 16 | (Philippines) | Rudolf Belmonte | 5 ft 11 in (1.80 m) | | | UST |
| F | 18 | (Philippines) | Art Dela Cruz | 6 ft 2 in (1.88 m) | | | San Sebastian |
| G/F | 21 | (United States) | Kenny Travis (I) | 6 ft 1 in (1.85 m) | | | New Mexico State |
| F | 23 | (Philippines) | Paul Alvarez | 6 ft 1 in (1.85 m) | | | San Sebastian |
| F/C | 25 | (Philippines) | Freddie Abuda | 6 ft 4 in (1.93 m) | | | Cebu |
| C | 52 | (Philippines) | Gido Babilonia | 6 ft 6 in (1.98 m) | | | UST |

Coaches
Head coach
- (United States) Norman Black
Assistant(s)
- (Philippines) Jong Uichico
- (Philippines) Filomeno Pumaren

Legend
- (DP) Unsigned draft pick
- (FA) Free agent
- (S) Suspended
- (I) Import
- Injured

== Broadcast notes ==
| Game | Play-by-play | Analyst | Courtside Reporter |
|---|---|---|---|
| Game 1 | Ed Picson | Quinito Henson | |
| Game 2 | Sev Sarmenta | Andy Jao | |
| Game 3 | Noli Eala | Andy Jao | |
| Game 4 | Ed Picson | Andy Jao | |
| Game 5 | Sev Sarmenta | Quinito Henson | |
| Game 6 | Ed Picson | Andy Jao | |
| Game 7 | Sev Sarmenta | Andy Jao | Ronnie Nathanielsz, Anthony Suntay and Butch Maniego |
