= 1995 PBA All-Filipino Cup finals =

Basketball cup finals

Team	Coach	Wins
Sunkist Orange Juicers	Derrick Pumaren	4
Alaska Milkmen	Tim Cone	3
- Dates: May 7–21, 1995
- MVP: Vergel Meneses
- Television: Vintage Sports (PTV)
- Radio network: DZRH

PBA All-Filipino Cup finals chronology
- < 1994 1996 >

PBA finals chronology
- < 1994 Governors 1995 Commissioner's >

The 1995 PBA All-Filipino Cup finals was the best-of-7 series basketball championship of the 1995 PBA All-Filipino Cup, and the conclusion of the conference playoffs. The Sunkist Orange Juicers and Alaska Milkmen played for the 60th championship contested by the league.

Sunkist Orange Juicers won over Alaska Milkmen in a seven-game series for their third PBA title. The Juicers became the 8th team to win the All-Filipino crown.

== Qualification ==
Sunkist		Alaska
Finished 7–3 (.700), 1st	Eliminations	Finished 5–5 (.500), tied for 3rd
Finished 13–5 (.722), 1st	Semifinals	Finished 10–8 (.556), tied for 2nd
Finished 13–5 (.722), 1st	Playoff	Won against Purefoods, 115–89

== Series scoring summary ==
Team	Game 1	Game 2	Game 3	Game 4	Game 5	Game 6	Game 7	Wins
Sunkist	104	92	98	88	95	86	87	4
Alaska	110	85	92	94	90	92	78	3
Venue	Cuneta	Cuneta	Araneta	Cuneta	Cuneta	Cuneta	Cuneta

== Games summary ==
=== Game 1 ===
Vintage

May 7

recap

Sunkist Orange Juicers 104, Alaska Milkmen 110
Pts: Vergel Meneses 24	Pts: Jojo Lastimosa 34
Alaska leads series, 1–0

Cuneta Astrodome, Pasay

Alaska rallied from 12 points down and held Sunkist scoreless in the last 1:28. Jojo Lastimosa, who finish with 34 points, Abarrientos, Hawkins and rookie Jeffrey Cariaso knock in the Milkmen's last eight points to seal the come-from-behind win.

=== Game 2 ===
Vintage

May 9

recap

Sunkist Orange Juicers 92, Alaska Milkmen 85
Pts: Vergel Meneses 20	Pts: Johnny Abarrientos 24
Series tied, 1–1

Cuneta Astrodome, Pasay

Nelson Asaytono led a fourth quarter assault as he struck for six points in a 10–2 blast by the Juicers starting the final period that turned a slim 70–68 lead to an 80–70 advantage. The Milkmen did not score for more than five minutes during the Juicers' run.

=== Game 3 ===
Vintage

May 12

recap

Sunkist Orange Juicers 98, Alaska Milkmen 92
Pts: Bonel Balingit 22	Pts: Jeffrey Cariaso 20
Sunkist leads series, 2–1

Araneta Coliseum, Quezon City

Bonel Balingit banged in a career-high 22 points, poured in 14 of his points in the decisive fourth quarter as the Juicers, who trailed by as many as 14 points in the third period, came back to outscore the Milkmen, 32–18 in the final 12 minutes.

=== Game 4 ===
Vintage

May 14

recap

Sunkist Orange Juicers 88, Alaska Milkmen 94
Pts: Vergel Meneses 36	Pts: Jojo Lastimosa 33
Series tied, 2–2

Cuneta Astrodome, Pasay

Jeffrey Cariaso scored 11 of Alaska's last 13 points and broke the final tie at 81-all with a driving layup, Sunkist' Rudy Distrito committed a flagrant foul on Cariaso when he hit the rookie's back on the way down from a layup, sending him crashing to the floor. Vergel Meneses, who won best player of the conference, had a strong third quarter, scoring the Juicer's first 16 points with three triples.

=== Game 5 ===
Vintage

May 16

recap

Sunkist Orange Juicers 95, Alaska Milkmen 90
Pts: Vergel Meneses 31	Pts: Bong Hawkins 28
Sunkist leads series, 3–2

Cuneta Astrodome, Pasay

Sunkist led by as much as 22 points, the last at 80–58. Bong Hawkins scored 24 of his 28 points in the second half as he combined with Johnny Abarrientos to bring the milkmen to within two, 87–89 with only 1:26 left. Juicers' guard Ricric Marata struck inside with a layup and Bonel Balingit's short stab and a foul off Alaska's Poch Juinio gave Sunkist a 93–87 edge.

=== Game 6 ===
Vintage

May 19

recap

Sunkist Orange Juicers 86, Alaska Milkmen 92
Pts: Meneses 16 Asaytono 16	Pts: Abarrientos 21
Series tied, 3–3

Cuneta Astrodome, Pasay

Alaska held down Vergel Meneses to only 16 points while Johnny Abarrientos poured in 19 of his 21 points in the second half, most of them in the third quarter run, a Poch Juinio follow up on a Lastimosa miss gave Alaska an 85–74 lead with only 1:15 left.

=== Game 7 ===
Vintage

May 21

recap

Sunkist Orange Juicers 87, Alaska Milkmen 78 (OT)
Pts: Vergel Meneses 18	Pts: Jeffrey Cariaso 24
Sunkist wins series, 4–3

Cuneta Astrodome, Pasay

Bonel Balingit and Ricric Marata knock in nine of Sunkist' 13 points in overtime as the Juicers held on to beat Alaska and hand coach Derrick Pumaren his first PBA title. Vergel Meneses sank in a clutch triple with time winding down in regulation after the Milkmen battled back from 13 points to take a 73–69 lead. Yoyoy Villamin scored on a Meneses assist to tie the count at 74-all with 10 seconds left, Johnny Abarrientos missed on a short jumper inside the paint as Alaska blew a chance to win the game outright.

1995 PBA All-Filipino Cup Champions

Sunkist Orange Juicers
Third title

== Occurrences ==
Sunkist' Rudy Distrito was sacked by the PBA for the rest of the season for nudging Jeffrey Cariaso in mid air during Game 4. An incident also took place in that game involving a bodyguard of Alaska team owner Wilfred Uytengsu, who harassed Distrito and Vergel Meneses following Distrito's dangerous foul on Jeffrey Cariaso.

== Rosters ==
Sunkist Orange Juicers roster
Players
Coaches

Pos.	No.	Nat.	Name	Ht.	Wt.
C	4	(Philippines)	Bonel Balingit	6 ft 9 in (2.06 m)		Visayas
G	8	(Philippines)	Al Solis	5 ft 11 in (1.80 m)		Visayas
G	9	(Philippines)	Boybits Victoria	5 ft 11 in (1.80 m)		San Beda
F	10	(Philippines)	Enrique Reyes	6 ft 4 in (1.93 m)		Ateneo
F	11	(Philippines)	Nelson Asaytono	6 ft 3 in (1.91 m)		Manila
F	13	(Philippines)	Elpidio Villamin	6 ft 2 in (1.88 m)
G	14	(Philippines)	Rudy Distrito	5 ft 11 in (1.80 m)		UE
G	16	(Philippines)	Marcelino Albarillo	5 ft 10 in (1.78 m)		Mindanao
F	18	(Philippines)	Vergel Meneses	6 ft 3 in (1.91 m)		José Rizal
F	19	(Philippines)	Kenneth Duremdes	6 ft 3 in (1.91 m)		Adamson
G	23	(Philippines)	Ricardo Marata	5 ft 9 in (1.75 m)		Southwestern-U
C	35	(Philippines)	Zaldy Realubit	6 ft 6 in (1.98 m)		USJ–R

Head coach

- (Philippines) Derrick Pumaren

Assistant coach(es)

- (Philippines) Gabby Velasco

Legend

- (C) Team captain
- Injured

Alaska Milkmen roster
Players
Coaches

Pos.	No.	Nat.	Name	Ht.	Wt.	Age
G/F	4	(Philippines)	Merwin Castelo	6 ft 2 in (1.88 m)			San Beda
G	5	(Philippines)	Gilbert Reyes	5 ft 8 in (1.73 m)			Ateneo
G/F	6	(Philippines)	Jojo Lastimosa	6 ft 1 in (1.85 m)			USJ–R
G	7	(Philippines)	Roehl Gomez	6 ft 0 in (1.83 m)			Cebu
C	12	(Philippines)	Dickie Bachmann	6 ft 5 in (1.96 m)			De La Salle
G	14	(Philippines)	Johnny Abarrientos	5 ft 8 in (1.73 m)			Far Eastern
F	16	(Philippines)	Bong Hawkins	6 ft 3 in (1.91 m)			UPHSD
G/F	22	(Philippines)	Jeffrey Cariaso	6 ft 2 in (1.88 m)			Sonoma State
C	24	(Philippines)	Cris Bolado	6 ft 7 in (2.01 m)			National-U
F/C	31	(Philippines)	Giovanni Pineda	6 ft 6 in (1.98 m)			Adamson
C	32	(Philippines)	Poch Juinio	6 ft 5 in (1.96 m)			UP Diliman
C	50	(Philippines)	Alex Araneta	6 ft 6 in (1.98 m)			Ateneo
F	54	(Philippines)	Dondon Ampalayo	6 ft 3 in (1.91 m)			USJ–R

Head coach

- (United States) Tim Cone

Assistant coach(es)

- (Philippines) Joel Banal
- (Philippines) Aric del Rosario

Legend

- (C) Team captain
- Injured

== Broadcast notes ==
Game	Play-by-play	Analyst	Courtside reporters
Game 1			
Game 2	Ed Picson	Quinito Henson	Anthony Suntay and Romy Kintanar
Game 3			
Game 4			
Game 5			
Game 6			
Game 7	Ed Picson	Andy Jao	
