= 1995 PBA Commissioner's Cup finals =

Basketball championship

Team	Coach	Wins
Sunkist Orange Juicers	Derrick Pumaren	4
Alaska Milkmen	Tim Cone	2
- Dates: August 25 – September 5, 1995
- Television: Vintage Sports (PTV)
- Radio network: DZRH

PBA Commissioner's Cup finals chronology
- < 1994 1996 >

PBA finals chronology
- < 1995 All-Filipino 1995 Governors' >

The 1995 PBA Commissioner's Cup finals was the best-of-7 championship series of the 1995 PBA Commissioner's Cup, and the conclusion of the conference playoffs. The Sunkist Orange Juicers and the Alaska Milkmen played for the 61st championship contested by the league.

The Alaska Milkmen and Sunkist Orange Juicers clash in the PBA finals for the third straight conference, living up to their billing as the rivalry of the mid-1990s. Sunkist repeated over Alaska for their second straight crown of the season and fourth title overall as the Orange Juicers bolster its bid towards the Grandslam.

== Qualification ==
Sunkist		Alaska
Finished 9–1 (.900), 1st	Eliminations	Finished 7–3 (.700), 3rd
Finished 12–3 (.800), 1st	Quarterfinals	Finished 10–5 (.667), tied for 2nd
defeated Purefoods, 3-2	Best-of-5 semifinals	defeated Sta. Lucia, 3-0

== Series scoring summary ==
Team	Game 1	Game 2	Game 3	Game 4	Game 5	Game 6	Wins
Sunkist	112	99	99	95	93	106	4
Alaska	106	105	87	93	114	87	2
Venue	Cuneta	Cuneta	Araneta	Araneta	Cuneta	Cuneta

== Games summary ==
=== Game 1 ===
Vintage

August 25

Sunkist Orange Juicers 112, Alaska Milkmen 106 (OT)
Pts: Grandison 30 Asaytono 26	Pts: Hamilton 37
Sunkist leads series, 1-0

Cuneta Astrodome, Pasay

Alaska led 96-88 going into the final 3:13 of regulation but a 6-0 roll by Sunkist capped by a three-pointer from Boybits Victoria cut the lead to two, 96-94 with two minutes left. Vergel Meneses scored two short jumpers, the last over Merwin Castelo with 46.2 seconds remaining, to tie the count and forces overtime at 98-all. Meneses team up with Nelson Asaytono and Ronnie Grandison in the extra period as the Juicers unleashed a 9-4 spurt that gave them a 107-102 advantage with time down to 2:02.

=== Game 2 ===
Vintage

August 27

Sunkist Orange Juicers 99, Alaska Milkmen 105
Pts: Ronnie Grandison 19	Pts: Derrick Hamilton 44
Series tied, 1-1

Cuneta Astrodome, Pasay

The Milkmen led by as many as 19 points in the first half but foul trouble on big men Cris Bolado, Bong Hawkins and import Derrick Hamilton allowed the Juicers to come within a point, 92-91, a final 11-2 burst capped by a two-handed back dunk by Hamilton gave Alaska a 103-93 lead with only 33.6 seconds left. Hamilton finished the game with 44 points and 12 rebounds.

=== Game 3 ===
Vintage

August 29

Sunkist Orange Juicers 99, Alaska Milkmen 87
Pts: Nelson Asaytono 27	Pts: Derrick Hamilton 29
Sunkist leads series, 2-1

Araneta Coliseum, Quezon City

With Alaska guard Johnny Abarrientos sideline with a bruised right thigh, Sunkist turned to Nelson Asaytono for the crucial baskets in the last 1:26 to thwart the milkmen's final rally. The Juicers led by 17 points, 54-37, at the start of the third quarter, but the milkmen rallied to within four points, 85-89 with 1:43 left, despite Abarrientos' absence.

=== Game 4 ===
Vintage

September 1

Sunkist Orange Juicers 95, Alaska Milkmen 93
Sunkist leads series, 3-1

Araneta Coliseum, Quezon City

=== Game 5 ===
Vintage

September 3

Sunkist Orange Juicers 93, Alaska Milkmen 114
Sunkist leads series, 3-2

Cuneta Astrodome, Pasay

=== Game 6 ===
Vintage

September 5

Sunkist Orange Juicers 106, Alaska Milkmen 87
Sunkist wins series, 4-2

Cuneta Astrodome, Pasay

Sunkist came in full battle gear and right from the first half took a commanding 16-point lead at 52-36. The Milkmen gave the Juicers a scare in the third quarter but after several miscues, the Orange Juicers regained composure to upend an impending rally.

1995 PBA Commissioners Cup Champions

Sunkist Orange Juicers
Fourth title

== Rosters ==
Sunkist Orange Juicers roster
Players
Coaches

Pos.	No.	Nat.	Name	Ht.	Wt.	Age
C	4	(Philippines)	Bonel Balingit	6 ft 9 in (2.06 m)			Visayas
G	8	(Philippines)	Al Solis	5 ft 11 in (1.80 m)			Visayas
G	9	(Philippines)	Boybits Victoria	5 ft 11 in (1.80 m)			San Beda
F	10	(Philippines)	Enrique Reyes	6 ft 4 in (1.93 m)			Ateneo
F	11	(Philippines)	Nelson Asaytono	6 ft 3 in (1.91 m)			Manila
F	13	(Philippines)	Elpidio Villamin	6 ft 2 in (1.88 m)
G	16	(Philippines)	Teroy Albarillo	5 ft 10 in (1.78 m)			Mindanao
F	18	(Philippines)	Vergel Meneses	6 ft 3 in (1.91 m)			José Rizal
F	19	(Philippines)	Kenneth Duremdes	6 ft 3 in (1.91 m)			Adamson
G	23	(Philippines)	Ricardo Marata	5 ft 9 in (1.75 m)			Southwestern-U
F	31	(United States)	Ronnie Grandison (I)	6 ft 6 in (1.98 m)			LSU New Orleans
C	35	(Philippines)	Zaldy Realubit	6 ft 6 in (1.98 m)			USJ–R

Head coach

- (Philippines) Derrick Pumaren

Assistant coach(es)

- (Philippines) Gabby Velasco

Legend

- (C) Team captain
- (I) Import
- Injured

Alaska Milkmen roster
Players
Coaches

Pos.	No.	Nat.	Name	Ht.	Wt.
F	3	(United States)	Derrick Hamilton (I)	6 ft 7 in (2.01 m)	225 lb (102 kg)	Southern Miss
G/F	4	(Philippines)	Merwin Castelo	6 ft 2 in (1.88 m)		San Beda
G	5	(Philippines)	Gilbert Reyes	5 ft 8 in (1.73 m)		Ateneo
G/F	6	(Philippines)	Jojo Lastimosa	6 ft 1 in (1.85 m)		USJ–R
G	7	(Philippines)	Roehl Gomez	6 ft 0 in (1.83 m)		Cebu
C	12	(Philippines)	Dickie Bachmann	6 ft 5 in (1.96 m)		De La Salle
G	14	(Philippines)	Johnny Abarrientos	5 ft 8 in (1.73 m)		Far Eastern
F	16	(Philippines)	Bong Hawkins	6 ft 3 in (1.91 m)		UPHSD
G/F	22	(Philippines)	Jeffrey Cariaso	6 ft 2 in (1.88 m)		Sonoma State
C	24	(Philippines)	Cris Bolado	6 ft 7 in (2.01 m)		National-U
F/C	31	(Philippines)	Giovanni Pineda	6 ft 6 in (1.98 m)		Adamson
C	32	(Philippines)	Poch Juinio	6 ft 5 in (1.96 m)		UP Diliman
C	50	(Philippines)	Alex Araneta	6 ft 6 in (1.98 m)		Ateneo
F	54	(Philippines)	Dondon Ampalayo	6 ft 3 in (1.91 m)		USJ–R

Head coach

- (United States) Tim Cone

Assistant coach(es)

- (Philippines) Joel Banal
- (Philippines) Aric del Rosario

Legend

- (C) Team captain
- (I) Import
- Injured

== Broadcast notes ==
Game	Play-by-play	Analyst	Courtside reporters
Game 1	Sev Sarmenta	Andy Jao	Anthony Suntay and Butch Maniego
Game 2	Noli Eala	Quinito Henson	
Game 3	Ed Picson	Andy Jao	Anthony Suntay and Butch Maniego
Game 4	Sev Sarmenta	Quinito Henson	Anthony Suntay and Butch Maniego
Game 5	Noli Eala	Andy Jao	
Game 6	Sev Sarmenta	Quinito Henson	Anthony Suntay and Butch Maniego
