= 1995 Pepsi Mega Bottlers season =

- Head coach: Yeng Guiao
- General manager: Dindo Raymundo
- Owner: Pepsi Philippines

All Filipino Cup results
- Record: 4–6 (40%)
- Place: 8th
- Playoff finish: N/A

Commissioner's Cup results
- Record: 1–9 (10%)
- Place: 8th
- Playoff finish: N/A

Governors Cup results
- Record: 2–8 (20%)
- Place: 7th
- Playoff finish: N/A

Pepsi Mega Bottlers seasons

The 1995 Pepsi Mega Bottlers season was the 6th season of the franchise in the Philippine Basketball Association (PBA).

== 1995 PBA draft ==
Round	Pick	Player	College
3		Armoni Llagas	San Sebastian
4		Ponce Anthony Castelo	De La Salle
5		Ronald Peña	Letran

== Summary ==
The Bottlers won their first two games of the season, upsetting Alaska Milkmen, 99-93 in overtime on February 21, followed by a 94-80 win over San Miguel on February 28. The Mega Bottlers had four wins and two losses when they lost their last four games and were eliminated from the All-Filipino Cup semifinal race along with San Miguel Beermen and Ginebra.

Bob McCann, who played for three NBA teams spread over three years, was Pepsi's import in the Commissioners Cup. He scored 44 points in leading the Bottlers to a 91-87 win over Formula Shell in the opening game on June 9, spoiling the debut of the much-hype Shell reinforcement Jarvis Matthews. The Bottlers lost all their remaining games with McCann being replaced by Kelbey Stuckey in their last three assignments.

Donnie Seale played two games in which Pepsi narrowly lost to Shell and Purefoods, Seale was sent home in favor of Gregory Guy, who lasted three games and also didn't impressed the coaching staff. Replacing Greg Guy was Derrick Canada. On October 15, Pepsi Mega won over Ginebra San Miguel, 112-106, in a match-up between the league's two doormat teams. The Bottlers close out their season campaign by winning their last game against Sta.Lucia Realtors, 97-91 on November 10.

== Roster ==
1995 Pepsi Mega Bottlers roster
Players

Pos.	#	POB	Name	Height	Weight	DOB (YYYY–MM–DD)	From
F	2	(Philippines)	Dwight Lago	6 ft 3 in (1.91 m)			De La Salle
G/F	3	(Philippines)	Romeo Lopez	6 ft 1 in (1.85 m)			Angeles
G	7	(Philippines)	Eugene Quilban	5 ft 7 in (1.70 m)			San Sebastian
F/C	8	(Philippines)	Alvin Teng	6 ft 4 in (1.93 m)			Arellano
G/F	9	(Philippines)	Boy Cabahug	5 ft 11 in (1.80 m)			Visayas
G	10	(Philippines)	Dindo Pumaren	5 ft 9 in (1.75 m)			De La Salle
G	11	(Philippines)	Saturnino Garrido	5 ft 11 in (1.80 m)			San Sebastian
F	14	(Philippines)	Larry Villanil	6 ft 0 in (1.83 m)			USPF
F/C	15	(Philippines)	Joey Santamaria	6 ft 3 in (1.91 m)			De La Salle
C	17	(Philippines)	Kevin Ramas	6 ft 4 in (1.93 m)			Mapúa
C	18	(Philippines)	Rey Cuenco	6 ft 4 in (1.93 m)			De La Salle Araneta
F	32	(Philippines)	Bobby Jose	6 ft 3 in (1.91 m)			UST
F/C	88	(Philippines)	Cadel Mosqueda	6 ft 3 in (1.91 m)			Arellano

Coaches

Head coach

- (Philippines) Yeng Guiao

Assistant coach(es)

- (Philippines) Bong Go
- (Philippines) Roehl Nadurata

Legend

- (C) Team captain
- Injured

== Transactions ==
=== Trades ===
Off-season	To San Miguel Victor Pablo	To Pepsi Alvin Teng
Off-season	To San Miguel Gido Babilonia	To Pepsi Kevin Ramas

=== Additions ===
Player	Signed	Former team
Saturnino Garrido	Off-season	Shell
Bobby Jose	March 1995	Ginebra

=== Recruited imports ===
IMPORT	Conference	No.	Pos.	Ht.	College	Duration
Bob McCann	Commissioner's Cup	30	Center	6"5'	Morehead State	June 9 to July 4
Kelbey Stuckey	Commissioner's Cup	4	Forward	6"5'	Missouri State	July 9-16
Donnie Seale	Governors' Cup		Guard	6"2'	North Carolina State	September 29 to October 6
Greg Guy	Governors' Cup		Guard	5"10'	UTPA	October 8-15
Derrick Canada	Governors' Cup	5	Guard	6"2'	West Point	October 20 to November 10
