= Eric Reyes (basketball) =

Filipino basketball player & analyst (born 1967)

Personal information
- Born: December 24, 1967 (age 58)
- Listed height: 6 ft 3 in (1.91 m)
- Listed weight: 205 lb (93 kg)

Career information
- College: Ateneo
- PBA draft: 1992: 1st round, 6th overall pick
- Drafted by: Swift Migthy Meaty
- Playing career: 1995–2002
- Position: Small forward / Power forward
- Number: 10, 24, 14,

Career history
- 1992–1996: Sunkist Orange Juicers
- 1997–2000: Mobiline Phone Pals
- 2001–2002: Alaska Aces

Career highlights
- 4x PBA champion (1992 Third Conference, 1993 Commissioner's, 1995 All-Filipino, 1995 Commissioner's); 2× UAAP champion (1987, 1988)

Enrique "Eric" Reyes (born December 24, 1967) is a Filipino former basketball player who served as a game analyst on PBA on One Sports.

== Playing career ==
Reyes played with Danny Francisco, Chot Reyes' brother Jun and future PBA star Olsen Racela in Ateneo Blue Eagles, and won championship against Jerry Codiñera-led UE in 1987 and Dindo Pumaren-led La Salle in 1988. In PBA, he played for Sunkist, Mobiline, and Alaska.

== Personal life ==
Reyes joined a running competition called ING 20-A Race To Build 20 Homes. Reyes has a son named Gab who playing for Purefoods/Magnolia Hotshots' Batang PBA division.

Reyes also working for TV and radio coverages of PBA.
