= 1995 Sta. Lucia Realtors season =

- Head coach: Nat Canson
- Owner(s): Sta. Lucia Realty and Development Corporation

All Filipino Cup results
- Record: 11–9 (55%)
- Place: 3rd
- Playoff finish: Semifinals

Commissioner's Cup results
- Record: 12–8 (60%)
- Place: 3rd
- Playoff finish: Semifinals

Governor's Cup results
- Record: 4–6 (40%)
- Place: 6th
- Playoff finish: N/A

Sta. Lucia Realtors seasons

The 1995 Sta. Lucia Realtors season was the 3rd season of the franchise in the Philippine Basketball Association (PBA).

== Draft picks ==
Round	Pick	Player	College
1	1	Dennis Espino	UST
3		Ferdinand Pastor	Cebu Doctors
4		Jose Francisco	FEU

== Occurrences ==
During the off-season, the Sta.Lucia Realtors match the P 28.8 million, five-year offer sheet by Pepsi Mega to Jun Limpot, making the former La Salle Green Archer the highest paid local player in the PBA.

Sta.Lucia was fined by the PBA office for the below-par showing of the team in the last day of the eliminations of the All-Filipino Cup on April 7 wherein the Realtors lost to Alaska Milkmen which ousted three other teams hoping to create a four-way tie for the fifth and last semifinals berth had Sta.Lucia won.

== Summary ==
On March 24, top draft pick Dennis Espino finally debut in leading the Realtors to a 95–91 win over San Miguel in the out-of-town game in Tuguegarao. Sta.Lucia enters the semifinal round with five wins and five losses, the Realtors were a win away from earning a finals playoff berth via win five games in the semifinals but they lost to Purefoods, 90–92, in their last game on April 30 and were booted out from the finals race. Sta.Lucia placed third with a two-game sweep over Purefoods in their best-of-three series.

After original choice Clifford Reed was sent home and never got a chance to play in the Commissioners Cup, Antoine Davison came as a late replacement and played poorly, scoring only 14 points despite the Realtors winning over Alaska in overtime, 101–97, in their first game on June 11, Davison lasted just one game and was replaced by Sam Mack, who also played only one game and left, leaving the Realtors importless in their next two games. Sta.Lucia finally got the right import in Frederick Pea and since his arrival, the Realtors won six straight games to finish second with eight wins and two losses, a game behind Sunkist after the eliminations. Sta.Lucia were tied with Alaska at 10 wins and five loss after the quarterfinal round. Both teams were seeded number two and three and will play against each other in the best-of-five semifinals. The Realtors were swept in three games by the Milkmen. Sta.Lucia placed third with another two-game sweep over Purefoods in their series for third place.

Coach Nat Canson brought in former North Carolina State's Kelsey Weems as their import but Weems left even before the Governors Cup started after he figured in a spat with Gerald Esplana. Coming in was Robert Francis Allen, a Canadian national player whose stint in the PBA was his first overseas assignment. The Realtors were four wins and five losses going into their last game in the eliminations on November 10, hoping to create at least a tie for the fifth semifinals berth if San Miguel losses in the second game of the doubleheader, but Sta.Lucia were upset and eliminated by also-ran Pepsi Mega, 91–97, with Robert Allen skipping the game due to an injury.

== Roster ==
1995 Sta. Lucia Realtors roster
Players

Pos.	#	POB	Name	Height	Weight	DOB (YYYY–MM–DD)	From
G/F	3	(United States)	Chris Jackson	6 ft 4 in (1.93 m)			San Bernardino Valley
F	8	(Philippines)	Roberto Jabar	6 ft 2 in (1.88 m)			Southwestern-U
G/F	9	(Philippines)	Ludovico Valenciano	6 ft 1 in (1.85 m)			USLS
G	10	(Philippines)	Boyet Fernandez	5 ft 8 in (1.73 m)			San Agustin
G	11	(Philippines)	Ferdinand Pastor	6 ft 1 in (1.85 m)			Cebu Doctors
F	12	(Philippines)	Jose Francisco	6 ft 1 in (1.85 m)			Far Eastern
F	13	(Philippines)	Johnedel Cardel	6 ft 0 in (1.83 m)			De La Salle
G	14	(Philippines)	Gerry Esplana	5 ft 11 in (1.80 m)			Far Eastern
F	15	(Philippines)	Expedito Falcasantos	6 ft 4 in (1.93 m)			Cebu
C	16	(Philippines)	Dennis Espino	6 ft 6 in (1.98 m)			UST
G	27	(Philippines)	Melchor Teves	6 ft 3 in (1.91 m)			San Sebastian
F	57	(Philippines)	Romeo Dela Rosa	6 ft 2 in (1.88 m)			Southwestern-U
F	62	(Philippines)	Alejandro De Guzman	6 ft 3 in (1.91 m)			Far Eastern
C	72	(Philippines)	Jun Limpot	6 ft 5 in (1.96 m)			De La Salle

Coaches

Head coach

- (Philippines) Nat Canson

Assistant coach(es)

- (Philippines) Ricardo Cui
- (Philippines) Adonis Tierra

Team manager

- (Philippines) Buddy Encarnado

Legend

- (C) Team captain
- Injured

== Transactions ==
=== Additions ===
Player	Signed	Former team
Johnedel Cardel	Off-season	Alaska
Ludovico Valenciano	Off-season	Pepsi

=== Trades ===
Off-season	To Purefoods Jack Tanuan	To Sta. Lucia Chris Jackson ^{4th overall pick from Purefoods}

=== Recruited imports ===
IMPORT	Conference	No.	Pos.	Ht.	College	Duration
Antoine Davison	Commissioner's Cup	2	Forward-Center	6"5'	Pfeiffer College	June 11 (one game)
Sam Mack	Commissioner's Cup	23	Forward	6"6'	University of Houston	June 16 (one game)
Frederick Pea	Commissioner's Cup	5	Forward	6"6'	USF	June 27 to August 27
Robert Allen	Governors' Cup	44	Guard	6"1'	UTPA	October 1 to November 10
