= Elpidio Villamin =

Filipino basketball player (born 1958)

Elpidio "Yoyoy" Villamin
Personal information
- Born: November 7, 1958 (age 68) Labo, Camarines Norte, Philippines
- Listed height: 6 ft 3 in (1.91 m)
- Listed weight: 188 lb (85 kg)

Career information
- College: FEU
- Playing career: 1981–2000
- Position: Forward / center
- Number: 12, 13

Career history
- 1981–1984: Crispa Redmanizers
- 1985–1986: Manila Beer Brewmasters
- 1987–1990: Alaska Milkmen
- 1991–1995: Swift Mighty Meaties
- 1996–1997: Pepsi Mega Bottlers
- 1998: San Miguel Beermen
- 1999–2000: Iloilo Megavoltz

Career highlights
- 9x PBA champion (1981 Reinforced, 1983 All-Filipino, 1983 Reinforced Filipino, 1983 Open, 1984 First All-Filipino, 1992 Third, 1993 Commissioner's, 1995 All-Filipino, 1995 Commissioner's); PBA Comeback Player of the Year (1995); 3x PBA All-Star (1989 - 1991); PBA Mythical 1st Team (1987); 3x PBA Mythical 2nd Team (1988, 1990 - 1991); 50 Greatest Players in PBA History (2025 selection); 7x PBA All-Defensive Team (1985 - 1990, 1995); PBA Grand Slam champion (1983)

Elpidio "Yoyoy" Villamin (born November 7, 1958, in Labo, Camarines Norte, Philippines), is a retired Filipino professional basketball player in the Philippine Basketball Association (PBA).

Standing 6'3" on a muscular frame, Villamin earned the moniker "Bicolano Superman" because of his strong inside game and ability to dominate on both ends of the court. He played for Solid Mills and later, Asia Pacific Finance Corporation (APCOR) in the MICAA, where he distinguished himself as a valuable "big man" playing both center and forward positions.

== PBA career ==
Villamin was one of the five players recruited by the Crispa Redmanizers during the final conference of the 1981 PBA season. In 1983, he was Crispa's leading offensive rebounder in the All-Filipino while finishing the conference third overall in rebounds. After five seasons, Yoyoy became the fourth player in the PBA "Protected-list", meaning he could not play alongside top centers Ramon Fernandez, Abet Guidaben and Manny Victorino on the same team. In his first season with Hills Bros Coffee Kings in 1987, Villamin finished second in the MVP race to Abet Guidaben, the eventual MVP winner, but his performance merited the award from the Philippine Sportswriters Association (PSA) and Sports Columnists Organization of the Philippines (SCOOP) as their Most Outstanding Pro player of the year in 1987. It was also during this phenomenal season that Villamin came to be known as the other half of Alaska's twin-tower combination known as the "Bruise Brothers" alongside another tough defensive big man Ricky Relosa.

A knee injury slowed him down in later years, starting with his stint with Diet Sarsi, after Alaska dropped him from their lineup beginning the 1991 season, opting for younger players in a major revamp. He played his final year in the PBA at age 40, one of the very few players to play in the pro league in their 40s, and briefly saw action in the Metropolitan Basketball Association for the Iloilo Megavoltz along with Joey Mente, Vince Hizon, Dong Polistico, Jojo Lim, Dominic Uy and other.
