= 1995 Alaska Milkmen season =

- Head coach: Tim Cone
- General manager: Joaqui Trillo
- Owner: Wilfred Steven Uytengsu

All-Filipino Cup results
- Record: 14–12 (53.8%)
- Place: 2nd
- Playoff finish: Finals

Commissioner's Cup results
- Record: 15–9 (62.5%)
- Place: 2nd
- Playoff finish: Finals

Governors Cup results
- Record: 17–8 (68%)
- Place: 1st
- Playoff finish: Champions (def. San Miguel 4–3)

Alaska Milkmen seasons

The 1995 Alaska Milkmen season was the 10th season of the franchise in the Philippine Basketball Association (PBA).

== Draft picks ==
Round	Pick	Player	College
1	6	Jeffrey Cariaso	Sonoma State
1	8	Giovanni Pineda	Adamson University

== Summary ==
The Milkmen started their season by losing their first four games and were the last team to enter the semifinal round by winning their last four remaining matches in the eliminations for a five-win, five-loss card. In the semifinals, Alaska earn a playoff for a second finals berth via win-five of eight games, following a 102–92 win over Purefoods on the last day of the semifinal round on May 2. Three nights later on May 5, Alaska finally ended Purefoods' run of seven consecutive finals appearance in the All-Filipino tournament with a 115–89 rout. The Milkmen played the Sunkist Orange Juicers (formerly Swift last season) for the second straight time in a championship series, this time for the All-Filipino Cup crown. Their title series went all the way to a Game Seven and Alaska was so close of repeating as champions if not for Vergel Meneses' heroics in the regulation period, the deciding game went into overtime and the Milkmen lost to the Juicers, 78–87.

Alaska was able to secure the services of Derrick Hamilton, who last played for the Pepsi Hotshots back in 1990, as their import in the Commissioners Cup. After scoring just 21 points in his debut where the Milkmen lost to Sta.Lucia, 97–101 in overtime, Hamilton bounces back to score 40 points in his next game as Alaska scored its first win against his former team Pepsi Mega, 113–106 on June 13. The Milkmen raced to four wins and two losses and handed San Miguel Beermen their first loss in five games in a 102–101 win on June 27. The Milkmen finish third behind Sunkist and Sta.Lucia after the eliminations. In the one-round quarterfinals, Alaska and Sta.Lucia ended up tied with 10 wins and five losses and they played each other in the best-of-five semifinal series. The Realtors had beaten the Milkmen in three meetings in the conference prior to their series but Alaska surprisingly had an easier time scoring a 3–0 sweep and march into their fourth straight finals appearance. They went on to play the Sunkist Orange Juicers for the third consecutive time in a championship series. Alaska ended up bridesmaid for the second straight conference by losing to Sunkist in six games.

Sean Chambers returns anew and the Alaska Milkmen are ready to defend the title they won from last season. The Grandslam-seeking Sunkist and Alaska were on top of the standings after the eliminations and looks headed for a fourth encounter in the championship round. On November 14, the Milkmen gave the Orange Juicers their worst defeat in the semifinals in a 115–91 win. Two weeks later on November 28 with the first finals berth at stake, Alaska repeated over Sunkist, 111–105, for their 13th victory in 17 games and advances into their fifth straight finals stint dating back to last season's Commissioners Cup. The Milkmen watch the Juicers stumbled and lost their last three semifinal outings while giving the San Miguel Beermen a free ride to the championship series. Alaska retains the Governors Cup title and avoid finishing bridesmaid in all three conferences of the season by winning the last two games in a 4–3 series triumph over San Miguel Beermen, taking the deciding seventh game by 13 points.

== Roster ==
1995 Alaska Milkmen roster
Players

Pos.	#	POB	Name	Height	Weight	DOB (YYYY–MM–DD)	From
G	4	(Philippines)	Merwin Castelo	6 ft 2 in (1.88 m)			San Beda
G	5	(Philippines)	Gilbert Reyes	5 ft 8 in (1.73 m)			Ateneo
G/F	6	(Philippines)	Jojo Lastimosa	6 ft 0 in (1.83 m)			USJ–R
G	7	(Philippines)	Roehl Gomez	6 ft 1 in (1.85 m)			Cebu
C	12	(Philippines)	Dickie Bachmann	6 ft 5 in (1.96 m)			De La Salle
G	14	(Philippines)	Johnny Abarrientos	5 ft 8 in (1.73 m)			Far Eastern
F	16	(Philippines)	Bong Hawkins	6 ft 3 in (1.91 m)			UPHSD
G/F	22	(Philippines)	Jeffrey Cariaso	6 ft 2 in (1.88 m)			Sonoma State
C	24	(Philippines)	Cris Bolado	6 ft 7 in (2.01 m)			National-U
C	31	(Philippines)	Giovanni Pineda	6 ft 5 in (1.96 m)			Adamson
C	32	(Philippines)	Poch Juinio	6 ft 5 in (1.96 m)			UP Diliman
C	50	(Philippines)	Alex Araneta	6 ft 6 in (1.98 m)			Ateneo
F	54	(Philippines)	Dondon Ampalayo	6 ft 3 in (1.91 m)			USJ–R

Coaches

Head coach

- (United States) Tim Cone

Assistant coach(es)

- (Philippines) Joel Banal
- (Philippines) Aric del Rosario

Team manager

- (Philippines) Joaquin Trillo

Legend

- (C) Team captain
- Injured

=== Recruited imports ===
IMPORT	Conference	No.	Pos.	Ht.	College	Duration
Derrick Hamilton	Commissioner's Cup	3	Center-Forward	6"5'	USM	June 11 to September 5
Sean Chambers	Governors Cup	20	Forward	6"1'	Cal Poly San Luis Obispo	October 1 to December 19
