= Bonel Balingit =

Filipino basketball player

Personal information
- Born: November 30, 1967 (age 58) Kapatagan, Lanao del Norte, Philippines
- Listed height: 6 ft 9 in (2.06 m)
- Listed weight: 300 lb (136 kg)

Career information
- College: UV
- PBA draft: 1992: 2nd round, 11th overall pick
- Drafted by: Swift Mighty Meaty Hotdogs
- Playing career: 1992–2002
- Position: Center
- Number: 12, 4

Career history
- 1992–1998: Swift Mighty Meaties/Sunkist Orange Juicers/Pop Cola
- 1999–2000: San Juan Knights (MBA)
- 2001: Tanduay Rhum Masters
- 2002: Purefoods TJ Hotdogs

Career highlights
- 5× PBA champion (1992 Third, 1993 Commissioner's, 1995 All-Filipino, 1995 Commissioner's, 2002 Governors'); PBA Most Improved Player (1995)

Bonel Palahang Balingit (born November 30, 1967), also known as the Gentle Giant and Man-Mountain, is a Filipino retired professional basketball player who played as a center.

== Basketball career ==
Bonel played for the University of the Visayas and then joined Magnolia Ice Cream in the PBL. He turn pro in 1992 and was drafted in the second round and 11th overall by the Swift Mighty Meaty Hotdogs in the 1992 PBA draft. Balingit spent all of his first seven PBA seasons with the RFM franchise and was handled by coaches Yeng Guiao, Derrick Pumaren and Norman Black. He was part of the ballclub's four championships from 1992 to 1995 and won Most Improved Player honors in the 1995 PBA season.

Balingit moved to the Metropolitan Basketball Association beginning the 1999 season and played for the San Juan Knights. He returned to the PBA in 2001, playing for Tanduay Rhum Masters and have suited up for Purefoods TJ Hotdogs in his final playing career.

== Acting career ==
During his playing years, Balingit also dabbled into acting, appearing in TV sitcoms and comedy films. Currently, he stars in his own sitcom “Higans Tols The Wind”, produced by DotTv Studios.

== Political career ==
Balingit ran for a seat in the Cebu City Council as Councilor for Cebu City South, both in 2016 under the Liberal Party and in 2025 under Kilusang Bagong Lipunan, but were defeated.
