= Kenny Travis =

American basketball player

Personal information
- Born: February 6, 1965 (age 61) Fresno, California, U.S.
- Listed height: 6 ft 2 in (1.88 m)
- Listed weight: 175 lb (79 kg)

Career information
- High school: Edison (Fresno, California)
- College: Fresno City (1983–1985); New Mexico State (1985–1987)
- NBA draft: 1987: 6th round, 115th overall pick
- Drafted by: Los Angeles Lakers
- Position: Guard / forward
- Number: 21

Career history
- 1988: Fresno Flames (WBL)
- 1988: Purefoods Hotdogs (PBA)
- 1992–1995: San Miguel Beermen (PBA)

Career highlights
- PBA champion (1993 Governors')
- Stats at Basketball Reference

Kenny Travis (born February 6, 1965) is an American former professional basketball player.

== Career ==
A junior college standout, Travis played two years at New Mexico State from the 1985–86 to 1986–87 season. In his final year, he averaged 20.2 points, 7.3 rebounds, 2.6 assists and 1.8 steals with a 46.4% hit from the three-point range. Those statistics convinced the Los Angeles Lakers to choose him in the sixth round of the 1987 NBA draft.

Travis played for the Fresno Flames in the World Basketball League in the summer of 1988. He later played in the Philippine Basketball Association that same year, and spent four more seasons in the PBA from 1992 to 1995, while playing for San Miguel Beermen.
