= 1995 Purefoods Tender Juicy Hotdogs season =

- Head coach: Chot Reyes
- General manager: Teddy Dimayuga
- Owner: Purefoods Corporation

All Filipino Cup results
- Record: 10–11 (47.6%)
- Place: 4th
- Playoff finish: Semifinals

Commissioner's Cup results
- Record: 11–11 (50%)
- Place: 4th
- Playoff finish: Semifinals

Governors Cup results
- Record: 9–9 (50%)
- Place: 5th
- Playoff finish: Semifinals

Purefoods Tender Juicy Hotdogs seasons

The 1995 Purefoods Tender Juicy Hotdogs season was the 8th season of the franchise in the Philippine Basketball Association (PBA).

== Draft picks ==
Round	Pick	Player	College
1	7	Edmund Reyes	UST
2		Alejandro Lim	Visayas

== Summary ==
The Purefoods Tender Juicy Hotdogs were looking forward to their eight straight finals appearance in the All-Filipino Cup. They clinch a playoff for the second finals berth on April 30, escaping with a 92-90 win over Sta.Lucia for their 10th win in 17 games and eliminating the Realtors from the finals race. Two days later, the Hotdogs were forced into a sudden-death playoff by Alaska Milkmen. On May 5, Purefoods lost to Alaska in the knockout game via 89-115 rout and were booted out in the All-Filipino finals for the first time since joining the league in 1988. The Hotdogs were swept in two games by Sta.Lucia Realtors in their best-of-three series for third place.

Last year's best import awardee Kenny Redfield, who led the Hotdogs to a championship, was not available on time and Purefoods had to settle for Adrian Branch as their import in their first three games in the Commissioners Cup. Branch debut with 40 points in the Hotdogs' 98-104 loss to Sunkist on June 11. Winless in three starts, Kenny Redfield returns and replaces Branch. Redfield led the Hotdogs to their first win against Pepsi Mega, 92-84 in Cabanatuan City on June 24. Purefoods won five of their next six games in the elimination round and handed the Sunkist Orange Juicers their first loss after nine straight wins in a 91-81 victory on the final day of the elimination round on July 18.

In the six-team, carry-over quarterfinals, Purefoods started out with two straight wins and then lost their next two outings before making it to the final four by eliminating San Miguel Beermen, 104-103 in overtime on August 6. In the best-of-five semifinal series against Sunkist Orange Juicers, the Hotdogs forces a deciding fifth game by coming back from 15 points down early in the second quarter of Game four to win by a big margin in the final period. In Game five, Purefoods trailed by 16 points with less than six minutes left in the fourth quarter but they battled back to close the gap within three points before eventually losing to Sunkist, 99-105. The Hotdogs missed out a finals stint for the second straight conference in the season and this marks the first time in franchise history.

Former San Miguel import Jay Taylor, who last played in 1992, was Purefoods' reinforcement in the Governors Cup. The Hotdogs placed second in the eliminations and tied with Alaska Milkmen at seven wins and three losses and a game behind leader Sunkist Orange Juicers. Taylor played in their first four games in the semifinals in which they lost three of their outings that hurt their chances. Taylor was replaced by Gerrod Abram, who could only lead the team to one win in four games he played as Purefoods bowed out in fifth place and missing all three championships contested in the year.

== Notable dates ==
March 14: The Hotdogs' defense held Pepsi Mega to a lowest output in a 73-58 win. It was their third victory in five games in the All-Filipino Cup. Purefoods reset the lowest winning score with their total while Pepsi's anemic field goal shooting produced the lowest losing total.

March 28: In another show of defensive prowess, Purefoods held San Miguel Beermen to the second-lowest point total of 67 points on the way to an 80-67 victory.

July 25: Purefoods started their campaign in the single-round quarterfinals on a right track and a stern defense allowed the defending Commissioners Cup champions to escape with an 83-81 victory over Sta.Lucia Realtors.

July 28: Purefoods dealt Sunkist with a second consecutive loss in the 85-80 victory. The Hotdogs improved their slate to eight victories against four losses.

== Roster ==
1995 Purefoods Tender Juicy Hotdogs roster
Players

Pos.	#	POB	Name	Height	Weight	DOB (YYYY–MM–DD)	From
F	1	(Philippines)	Bong Ravena	6 ft 1 in (1.85 m)			UE
F/C	5	(Philippines)	Edmund Reyes	6 ft 3 in (1.91 m)			UST
F	7	(Philippines)	Rey Evangelista	6 ft 3 in (1.91 m)			UST
G	8	(Philippines)	Nonoy Chuatico	6 ft 1 in (1.85 m)			Ateneo
F	9	(Philippines)	Peter Naron	6 ft 3 in (1.91 m)			Visayas
F	10	(Philippines)	Jojo Martin	6 ft 3 in (1.91 m)			NCBA
G	11	(Philippines)	Richie Ticzon	5 ft 8 in (1.73 m)			Ateneo
G/F	12	(Philippines)	Glenn Capacio	6 ft 1 in (1.85 m)			Far Eastern
F	16	(Philippines)	Alvin Patrimonio	6 ft 3 in (1.91 m)			Mapúa
G	17	(Philippines)	Olsen Racela	5 ft 11 in (1.80 m)			Ateneo
F	19	(Philippines)	Jojo Lim	6 ft 3 in (1.91 m)			Visayas
C	41	(Philippines)	Jack Tanuan	6 ft 5 in (1.96 m)			Far Eastern
C	44	(Philippines)	Jerry Codinera	6 ft 5 in (1.96 m)			UE

Coaches

Head coach

- (Philippines) Chot Reyes

Assistant coach(es)

- (Philippines) Eric Altamirano

Legend

- (C) Team captain
- Injured

== Transactions ==
=== Trades ===
Off-season	To Sta. Lucia Realtors Chris Jackson ^{4th overall pick from Purefoods}	To Purefoods Jack Tanuan

Off-season	To Ginebra Vince Hizon	To Purefoods Emilio Chuatico

=== Additions ===
Player	Signed	Former team
Joselito Martin	Off-season	Shell

=== Recruited imports ===
IMPORT	Conference	No.	Pos.	Ht.	College	Duration
Adrian Branch	Commissioner's Cup	24	Forward	6”6’	University of Maryland	June 11–20
Kenny Redfield	Commissioner's Cup	3	Forward	6"5'	Michigan State	June 24 to August 20
Jay Taylor	Governors Cup	24	Forward-Guard	6"1'	Eastern Illinois	September 29 to November 19
Gerrod Abram	Governors Cup	23	Guard	6”1’	Boston University	November 24 to December 1
