= 1995 Ginebra San Miguel season =

- Head coach: Robert Jaworski
- General Manager: Francisco Villaruz
- Owner(s): La Tondeña Distillers, Inc.

All-Filipino Cup results
- Record: 4–6 (40%)
- Place: 6th
- Playoff finish: N/A

Commissioner's Cup results
- Record: 1–9 (10%)
- Place: 7th
- Playoff finish: N/A

Governors Cup results
- Record: 0–10 (0%)
- Place: 8th
- Playoff finish: N/A

Ginebra San Miguel seasons

The 1995 Ginebra San Miguel season was the 17th season of the franchise in the Philippine Basketball Association (PBA).

== Draft picks ==
Round	Pick	Player	College
1	2	Edward Joseph Feihl	Adamson
2	10	Robert Jaworski, Jr.	Ateneo de Manila

== Summary ==
Ginebra bowed to Shell Rimula-X, 88-100, in the opening game of the season on February 19. The Gins lost their first three outings but found success during their out-of-town matches by winning against Shell, 129-120 on March 5 in Cabanatuan City, and Pepsi, 106-95 in San Fernando, Pampanga on March 11. The Ginebras won their last game in the eliminations over Purefoods, 106-86 on April 7, but were eliminated in the All-Filipino Cup semifinals along with San Miguel Beermen and Pepsi Mega. All three teams finish with four wins and six losses.

Former Detroit Piston Isaiah Morris was Ginebra's import in the Commissioners Cup, the Ginebras won just once in the eliminations against Pepsi Mega, 122-116, in their third game on June 18 where Morris scored 50 points. The Gins lost their last seven matches for a dismal 1-9 won-loss slate. Morris played six games and was replaced by Darryl Prue, who played three games and with one assignment left for Ginebra in the elimination round, Prue was sent home and coming in was Alexander Coles, who was somehow impressive in the only game he played, a 106-112 Ginebra loss to Sta.Lucia on July 16. Coles later wowed the fans in the slam dunk contest during the All-Star Weekend.

In the Governors Cup, Andre Hardy played three games and was replaced by Antonio Madison. Ginebra went winless in 10 games in the elimination round and lost their last 17 games for a forgettable campaign, an overall season record of five wins and 25 losses, the worst in their franchise history.

== Roster ==
1995 Ginebra San Miguel roster
Players

Pos.	#	POB	Name	Height	Weight	DOB (YYYY–MM–DD)	From
C	5	(Philippines)	Sonny Cabatu	6 ft 5 in (1.96 m)			PSBA
F	6	(Philippines)	Noli Locsin	6 ft 3 in (1.91 m)			De La Salle
G	7	(Philippines)	Robert Jaworski	6 ft 0 in (1.83 m)			UE
F	9	(Philippines)	Macky De Joya	6 ft 3 in (1.91 m)			San Beda
G/F	11	(Philippines)	Jayvee Gayoso	6 ft 2 in (1.88 m)			Ateneo
G/F	12	(Philippines)	Vince Hizon	6 ft 2 in (1.88 m)			Ateneo
F/C	16	(Philippines)	Benito Cheng	6 ft 3 in (1.91 m)			Mapúa
F/C	18	(Philippines)	Wilmer Ong	6 ft 4 in (1.93 m)			USLS
F/C	19	(Philippines)	Stevenson Solomon	6 ft 4 in (1.93 m)			San Sebastian
G	25	(Philippines)	Pido Jarencio	5 ft 9 in (1.75 m)			UST
C	32	(Philippines)	EJ Feihl	7 ft 0 in (2.13 m)			Adamson
G	45	(Philippines)	Leo Isaac	6 ft 1 in (1.85 m)			Mapúa

Coaches

Head coach

- (Philippines) Robert Jaworski

Assistant coach(es)

- (Philippines) Rino Salazar
- (Philippines) Philip Cezar

Team manager

- (Philippines) Francisco Villaruz

Legend

- (C) Team captain
- Injured

== Transactions ==
=== Additions ===
Player	Signed	Former team
Leo Isaac	Off-season	Free agent
Stevenson Solomon	Off-season	Alaska

=== Trades ===
Off-season	To Purefoods Emilio Chuatico	To Ginebra Vince Hizon

=== Subtractions ===
Player	Signed	New team
#33 Bobby Jose	March 1995	Pepsi Mega

=== Recruited imports ===
IMPORT	Conference	No.	Pos.	Ht.	College	Duration
Isaiah Morris	Commissioner's Cup	35	Forward-Center	6"6'	University of Arkansas	June 9–27
Darryl Prue	Commissioner's Cup	24	Forward	6”6’	West Virginia	July 1–9
Alexander Coles	Commissioner's Cup	21	Forward-Center	6”6’	University of Delaware	July 16 (one game)
Andre Hardy	Governors Cup	23	Guard	6"2'	Clarke University	September 29 to October 7
Antonio Madison	Governors Cup	3	Guard	6"2'	UNO	October 13 to November 10
