= Ronnie Grandison =

American basketball player (born 1964)

Personal information
- Born: July 6, 1964 (age 62) Los Angeles, California, U.S.
- Listed height: 6 ft 6 in (1.98 m)
- Listed weight: 215 lb (98 kg)

Career information
- High school: St. Bernard (Los Angeles, California)
- College: UC Irvine (1982–1984); New Orleans (1985–1987)
- NBA draft: 1987: 5th round, 100th overall pick
- Drafted by: Denver Nuggets
- Playing career: 1987–2001
- Position: Power forward
- Number: 31, 35, 54, 20

Career history
- 1987–1988: Rochester Flyers
- 1988–1989: Boston Celtics
- 1991: Omaha Racers
- 1991–1992: Charlotte Hornets
- 1992: Omaha Racers
- 1992–1993: Rochester Renegade
- 1993: Purefoods Oodles
- 1993: Llíria
- 1993–1994: Rochester Renegade
- 1994: New York Knicks
- 1994–1995: Rapid City Thrillers
- 1995: Sunkist Orange Juicers
- 1995–1996: Miami Heat
- 1996: Atlanta Hawks
- 1996: Omaha Racers
- 1996: New York Knicks
- 1996–1997: Omaha Racers
- 1998: La Crosse Bobcats
- 1999–2000: Cincinnati Stuff
- 2000–2001: Rockford Lightning

Career highlights
- PBA champion (1995 Commissioner's); CBA Most Valuable Player (1994); 2× All-CBA First Team (1992, 1994); CBA All-Defensive Team (1994)
- Stats at NBA.com
- Stats at Basketball Reference

Ron Calvin Grandison (born July 6, 1964) is a former basketball player, who attended the University of California, Irvine and the University of New Orleans. He was the MVP and team captain as a college junior and senior. He was selected in the fifth round of the 1987 NBA draft, 100th pick overall, by the Denver Nuggets.

Grandison played in the NBA intermittently in all together 4 seasons (1988–1996), for five teams: Boston Celtics to which he was signed as a free agent on 11/27/1988. He was a strong rebounder and a solid defender. Played two seasons in the Continental Basketball Association. Charlotte Hornets, New York Knicks (two stints), Miami Heat and Atlanta Hawks, averaging 2.4 points per game. He was known primarily as a hard working player and a defensive specialist. Grandison made 4 career three point shots, all as a member of the Miami Heat during the 1995–96 season.

Grandison played in the Continental Basketball Association (CBA) for the Rochester Flyers, Omaha Racers, Rochester Renegade, Rapid City Thrillers, La Crosse Bobcats and Rockford Lightning from 1987 to 2001. He was selected as the CBA Most Valuable Player in 1994 and named to the All-CBA First Team in 1992 and 1994 and All-Defensive Team in 1994.

== Career statistics ==
Legend
GP	Games played	GS	Games started	MPG	Minutes per game
FG%	Field goal percentage	3P%	3-point field goal percentage	FT%	Free throw percentage
RPG	Rebounds per game	APG	Assists per game	SPG	Steals per game
BPG	Blocks per game	PPG	Points per game	**Bold**	Career high

=== NBA ===
==== Regular season ====
Year	Team	GP	GS	MPG	FG%	3P%	FT%	RPG	APG	SPG	BPG	PPG
1988–89	Boston	**72**	0	7.3	.415	.000	**.738**	1.3	.6	.3	.0	2.5
1991–92	Chicago	3	0	8.3	**.500**	—	.600	**3.7**	.3	.3	**.3**	**3.3**
1994–95	New York	2	0	4.0	.250	—	—	2.5	**1.0**	.0	.0	1.0
1995–96	Miami	18	**3**	**13.1**	.333	**.308**	.684	2.0	.6	.4	.1	2.4
1995–96	Atlanta	4	0	4.8	**.500**	.000	—	1.5	.3	.0	.0	1.0
1995–96	New York	6	0	9.5	.467	—	.667	2.2	.3	**.7**	.2	3.0
Career		105	3	8.3	.404	.167	.713	1.6	.6	.3	.1	2.4

==== Playoffs ====
Year	Team	GP	GS	MPG	FG%	3P%	FT%	RPG	APG	SPG	BPG	PPG
1996	New York	2	0	1.5	.000	.000	.000	.0	.0	.0	.0	.0
