= 1995 San Miguel Beermen season =

- Head coach: Norman Black
- Owner: San Miguel Corporation

All Filipino Cup results
- Record: 4–6 (40%)
- Place: 7th
- Playoff finish: N/A

Commissioner's Cup results
- Record: 8–7 (53.3%)
- Place: 5th
- Playoff finish: Quarterfinals

Governors Cup results
- Record: 15–10 (60%)
- Place: 2nd
- Playoff finish: Finals

San Miguel Beermen seasons

The 1995 San Miguel Beermen season was the 21st season of the franchise in the Philippine Basketball Association (PBA).

== Draft picks ==
Round	Pick	Player	College
1	5	Bryant Punzalan	FEU
2		Matthew Makalintal	Saint Benilde

== Retirement ==
Ramon Fernandez, who spent his last seven seasons with San Miguel Beer and one of the only three remaining pioneers in the PBA and the league's winningest cager with 19 titles, retired from active playing after 20 seasons at age 41.

Point guard Hector Calma, who's been with San Miguel since returning to the league in 1986 and was a key factor in the Beermen's Grandslam conquest in 1989, also decided to retire as he was saddled with injuries for most of the 1994 season.

Melchor Ravanes, who played for San Miguel from 1980 to 1985 and returned to the team from 1992 to 1994, decided to retire too and call it quits after 15 seasons.

== Summary ==
The defending All-Filipino champions beat Ginebra, 90–87, in their first game as the league returns to the Araneta Coliseum on February 24 after a decade. The Beermen had a hard time scoring victories with new acquisitions in their lineup. San Miguel defeated Pepsi Mega, 95–82, in their last game in the eliminations on April 4 for their fourth win in 10 games. The Beermen were ousted from the semifinals along with Ginebra and Pepsi.

Import John Best led the Beermen to four straight victories in the Commissioners Cup. San Miguel enters the quarterfinal round with six wins and four losses, the Beermen blew a chance to make it to the best-of-five semifinals when they lost to Purefoods, 103–104 in overtime, in their do-or-die battle on August 6 as both teams carry an 8-6 won-loss card on the last day of the quarterfinals. It was the first time the Beermen placed no higher than fourth in the first two conferences of the season since returning in 1986.

Kenny Travis is the Beermen's reinforcement in the season-ending conference for the fourth straight year. During the ongoing eliminations, a trade took place when San Miguel gave up pre-season acquisition Victor Pablo to Shell in exchange for Paul Alvarez. From a 6-4 won-loss slate in the eliminations, the Beermen advances in the Governors Cup finals on December 3 with the help of Formula Shell upsetting grandslam-seeking Sunkist Orange Juicers earlier in the first game, the Beermen easily won over their finals opponent Alaska Milkmen, 103–87, in the second game for their 12th win in 18 games and winning six of their eight semifinal assignments.

In the championship series between the last two Governors Cup titlist, San Miguel led three games to two and one win away from winning the crown. The Beermen were up by 16 points in the second quarter of Game Six but the Milkmen battled back in the second half to win the ballgame. In the deciding Game Seven, the Beermen were leading by four points with less than six minutes remaining in the fourth period but they went on to lose by 13 points, 86–99, as the Alaska Milkmen were able to retain the title they won from last season.

== Roster ==
1995 San Miguel Beermen roster
Players

Pos.	#	POB	Name	Height	Weight	DOB (YYYY–MM–DD)	From
G	5	(Philippines)	Franz Pumaren	5 ft 9 in (1.75 m)			De La Salle
G	6	(Philippines)	Ato Agustin	5 ft 11 in (1.80 m)			Lyceum
G	7	(Philippines)	Mike Mustre	6 ft 0 in (1.83 m)			Letran
F	8	(Philippines)	Allan Caidic	6 ft 2 in (1.88 m)			UE
C	10	(Philippines)	Adriano Polistico	6 ft 7 in (2.01 m)			Letran
G	11	(Philippines)	Matthew Makalintal	5 ft 8 in (1.73 m)			St. Benilde
F/C	12	(Philippines)	Yves Dignadice	6 ft 4 in (1.93 m)			STI WNU
C	15	(Philippines)	Bryant Punzalan	6 ft 5 in (1.96 m)			Far Eastern
G	16	(Philippines)	Rudolf Belmonte	6 ft 1 in (1.85 m)			UST
F	18	(Philippines)	Art Dela Cruz	6 ft 2 in (1.88 m)			San Sebastian
G	22	(Philippines)	Lou Regidor (injured)	5 ft 10 in (1.78 m)			San Carlos
F	23	(Philippines)	Paul Alvarez	6 ft 0 in (1.83 m)			San Sebastian
F/C	25	(Philippines)	Freddie Abuda	6 ft 4 in (1.93 m)			Cebu
C	52	(Philippines)	Gido Babilonia	6 ft 5 in (1.96 m)			UST

Coaches
Head coach
- (United States) Norman Black
Assistant(s)
- (Philippines) Jong Uichico
- (Philippines) Filomeno Pumaren

Legend
- (DP) Unsigned draft pick
- (FA) Free agent
- (S) Suspended
- Injured

== Transactions ==
=== Additions ===
Player	Signed	Deal Information
Mike Mustre	Off-season	Rookie free agent
Lou Regidor	Off-season	Draft rights acquired from Ginebra

=== Trades ===
Off-season	To Pepsi Alvin Teng	To San Miguel Beermen Victor Pablo
Off-season	To Pepsi Kevin Ramas	To San Miguel Beermen Gido Babilonia

=== Late-season trade ===
October 1995	To Formula Shell Victor Pablo	To San Miguel Beermen Paul Alvarez

=== Recruited imports ===
IMPORT	Conference	No.	Pos.	Ht.	College	Duration
John Best	Commissioner's Cup	21	Forward-Center	6"4'	Tennessee Tech	June 9 to August 6
Kenny Travis	Governors Cup	21	Guard-Forward	6"1'	New Mexico State	October 1 to December 19
