= Stevin Smith =

American basketball player (b. 1972)

Personal information
- Born: January 24, 1972 (age 54) Dallas, Texas, U.S.
- Listed height: 6 ft 0 in (1.83 m)
- Listed weight: 195 lb (88 kg)

Career information
- High school: H. Grady Spruce (Dallas, Texas)
- College: Arizona State (1990–1994)
- NBA draft: 1994: undrafted
- Playing career: 1994–2008
- Position: Shooting guard/Point Guard
- Number: 1

Career history
- 1994: Somontano Huesca
- 1994–1995: Grand Rapids Hoops
- 1995: Sunkist Orange Juicers
- 1995–1996: Grand Rapids Hoops
- 1996–1997: Sioux Falls Skyforce
- 1997: Dallas Mavericks
- 1997–1998: Olympique Antibes
- 1998–1999: Kuşadası
- 2000–2001: Olympique Antibes
- 2001–2002: SLUC Nancy
- 2002–2003: ASVEL Villeurbanne
- 2003–2004: Ironi Nahariya
- 2004–2006: Dynamo Moscow Region
- 2006–2007: Scafati Basket
- 2007–2008: Lukoil Academic

Career highlights
- CBA champion (1996); All-CBA Second Team (1997); CBA All-Rookie Second Team (1995); 2× First-team All-Pac-10 (1993, 1994)
- Stats at NBA.com
- Stats at Basketball Reference
Medals
Men's basketball
Representing United States
FIBA U21 World Championship
| Gold medal – first place | 1993 Valladolid | National team |

Stevin L. "Hedake" Smith (born January 24, 1972) is an American former professional basketball player, who is also known for his involvement in the 1994 Arizona State point-shaving scandal.

== Early life ==
Smith was born in Dallas, Texas, the only son of Eunice Smith. He was an outstanding high school basketball player. He played at Arizona State University under head coach Bill Frieder. His "Hedake" nickname originally came from his mother, who called her rambunctious child "Headache", but had to shorten the spelling for a personalized license plate.

== College career ==
Stevin "Hedake" Smith played point guard for Arizona State University from 1991 through 1994, and was a two-time All-Pac-10 selection. However, he also became involved in the 1994 Arizona State point-shaving scandal along with ASU teammate Isaac Burton. Smith would bet on his own games that he was fixing and received $20,000 for shaving points in the game against Oregon State on January 28, 1994. He was arrested in the summer of 1997, and in December 1997, Smith and Burton pleaded guilty to conspiracy charges, admitting to taking bribes to fix four games in 1994 Smith was sentenced to one year and one day in prison.

Smith holds the Arizona State career records for most three-point shots attempted and most three-point shots made.

== Professional basketball career ==
After failing to make an NBA team after leaving college in 1994, Smith took his game overseas, playing for the Spanish team Somontano Huesca during the 1994–95 season. He also played for the Grand Rapids Mackers of the Continental Basketball Association (CBA) and was selected to the CBA All-Rookie Team in 1995. Over the next four years, Smith played for teams in the Philippines, Turkey, France and in the CBA. He won a CBA championship with the Sioux Falls Skyforce in 1996. He was selected to the All-CBA Second Team in 1997.

During the 1997 NBA season, Smith signed two consecutive 10-day contracts with the Dallas Mavericks, and received his only NBA playing time. He played 60 minutes over eight games, scoring 14 points for a 1.8 per-game average.

After his release from prison in 2000, Smith returned to Europe and his professional basketball career, playing for three different teams based in France from 2001 to 2003, in the Israeli League in 2004 and for Dynamo Moscow in Russia for two seasons until 2006. In 2006–07, Smith joined Legea Scafati of the Italian Serie A league.

== Post-playing career ==
Stevin Smith later became the Vice President of the N.O.W. Program, a mentoring program for young people in the Dallas area. Additionally, Smith now educates student-athletes at NCAA colleges on his experience, working with gambling harm awareness education provider EPIC Global Solutions to deliver sessions in college settings.

== In popular culture ==
Smith is the subject of an episode of the 2021 Netflix documentary series Bad Sport.
