= 1995 Formula Shell Zoom Masters season =

- Head coach: Chito Narvasa
- General Manager: Vergel de Dios
- Owner(s): Pilipinas Shell

All Filipino Cup results
- Record: 6–12 (33.3%)
- Place: 5th
- Playoff finish: Semifinals

Commissioner's Cup results
- Record: 4–11 (26.7%)
- Place: 6th
- Playoff finish: Quarterfinals

Governor's Cup results
- Record: 10–11 (47.6%)
- Place: 4th
- Playoff finish: Semifinals

Formula Shell Zoom Masters seasons

The 1995 Formula Shell Zoom Masters season was the 11th season of the franchise in the Philippine Basketball Association (PBA). Known as Shell Rimula X in the All-Filipino Cup and Formula Shell Gas Kings in the Commissioner's Cup.

== Draft picks ==
Round	Pick	Player	College
2		Elmer Lago	De La Salle
3		Carlo Espiritu	Letran

== Summary ==
Shell Rimula X scored a 100–88 victory over Ginebra San Miguel in the lone game at the start of the PBA's 21st season on February 19, Paul Alvarez dished out an impressive performance in giving new Shell coach Chito Narvasa his first win. The Turbo Chargers won their first three outings before losing to Ginebra in Cabanatuan City on March 5. Shell finish second and a game behind Sunkist with six wins and four losses at the end of the All-Filipino Cup eliminations. In the semifinal round, Shell dropped to fifth place and didn't win any single game in their eight semifinal assignments.

Import Jarvis Basnight, who was supposed to play for Shell last year but was found to be a shade over the limit, finally got a chance to play in the PBA when the league decided to raise the height limit among imports to 6–7, Basnight used his mother's maiden name "Matthews" and played only one game, scoring 23 points in Shell's 87–91 loss to Pepsi Mega at the start of the Commissioners Cup on June 9. He was replaced by Kenny McCleary in the Gas Kings' next game. McCleary led Shell to their first victory in five games by winning against Ginebra San Miguel, 97–95 on June 25, to finally snapped out of a 13-game losing streak, counting their last game in the eliminations and eight semifinal games during the All-Filipino Cup. McCleary played nine games and was sent home in favor of the tried and tested Bobby Parks at the start of the single-round quarterfinals. The Gas Kings carry a 2-8 won-loss slate with no chance of making it to the final four semifinals.

Rodney Monroe, who played one game for Alaska in 1993, was Shell's import for the Governors Cup. The Gas Kings makes it to the semifinals by winning their last two outings in the eliminations for a 6-4 won-loss card. Shell was already out of contention for the finals berth when they pulled off a 113–103 win over Sunkist in the last day of the semifinals on December 3, ending the Orange Juicers' quest for a Grandslam season. Formula Shell places fourth in the season-ending conference which is their best finish since the 1993 Commissioners Cup.

== Notable dates ==
March 11: Ronnie Magsanoc drilled in 15 fourth quarter points to lead Shell Rimula-X to a 100-81 romp over San Miguel Beermen in San Fernando, Pampanga.

November 5: Ronnie Magsanoc's three-pointer with 1:24 to play triggered a whirlwind windup by Formula Shell as it stayed alive for a semifinals berth by blasting Purefoods Hotdogs, 111–98.

== Occurrences ==
During the Governors Cup, a week left before the end of the elimination round, the Gas Kings traded Paul Alvarez to San Miguel for Victor Pablo.

In Shell's 90–88 win over San Miguel on November 7, which booked the Gas Kings a semifinals seat in the Governors Cup, Beermen forward Art Dela Cruz was ejected from the ballgame for elbowing Shell import Rodney Monroe with 3:53 left in the third quarter, a total of P 53,000 fines were slapped on both teams from the players, team officials and utility personnel who left their benches to join the melee.

== Roster ==
1995 Formula Shell Zoom Masters roster
Players

Pos.	#	POB	Name	Height	Weight	DOB (YYYY–MM–DD)	From
G	5	(Philippines)	Ronnie Magsanoc	5 ft 9 in (1.75 m)			UP Diliman
F	6	(Philippines)	Joey Guanio	6 ft 2 in (1.88 m)			UP Diliman
G/F	9	(Philippines)	Henrico Gascon	6 ft 3 in (1.91 m)			Far Eastern
F	10	(Philippines)	Cris Bade	6 ft 3 in (1.91 m)			San Sebastian
F	12	(Philippines)	Porferio Marzan	6 ft 1 in (1.85 m)			Baguio
C	14	(Philippines)	Benjie Paras	6 ft 5 in (1.96 m)			UP Diliman
F	17	(Philippines)	Terry Saldaña	6 ft 3 in (1.91 m)			Letran
G	20	(Philippines)	Elmer Lago	6 ft 2 in (1.88 m)			De La Salle
G	22	(Philippines)	Frankie Lim	6 ft 0 in (1.83 m)			San Beda
C	32	(Philippines)	Jolly Escobar	6 ft 5 in (1.96 m)			UE
F/C	33	(Philippines)	Victor Pablo	6 ft 3 in (1.91 m)			Far Eastern
C	41	(Philippines)	Abet Guidaben	6 ft 5 in (1.96 m)			USJ–R
F	68	(Philippines)	Romulo Orillosa	6 ft 2 in (1.88 m)			Adamson
F	77	(Philippines)	Carlo Espiritu	6 ft 2 in (1.88 m)			Letran
G/F		(Philippines)	Pat Codiñera	6 ft 3 in (1.91 m)			Far Eastern

Coaches

Head coach

- (Philippines) Chito Narvasa

Assistant coach(es)

- (Philippines) Perry Ronquillo

Team manager

- (Philippines) Vergel de Dios

Legend

- (C) Team captain
- Injured

== Transactions ==
=== Additions ===
Player	Signed	Former team
Frankie Lim	Off-season	Purefoods
Porferio Marzan	Off-season	Tondeña 65

=== Trades ===
October 1995	To San Miguel Beermen Paul Alvarez	To Formula Shell Victor Pablo

=== Recruited imports ===
IMPORT	Conference	No.	Pos.	Ht.	College	Duration
Jarvis Matthews	Commissioner's Cup	2	Forward	6”6’	UNLV	June 9 (one game)
Kenneth McCleary	Commissioner's Cup	33	Center	6”6’	University of Florida	June 16 to July 14
Bobby Parks	Commissioner's Cup	22	Forward	6”3’	Memphis State	July 28 to August 8
Rodney Monroe	Governors Cup	23	Guard	6”1’	North Carolina State	September 29 to December 12
