= 1995 PBA season =

21st PBA season

- Duration: February 19 – December 19, 1995
- Teams: 8
- TV partner: Vintage Sports (PTV)

1995 PBA Draft
- Top draft pick: Dennis Espino
- Picked by: Sta. Lucia Realtors
- Season MVP: Vergel Meneses (Sunkist Orange Juicers)
- All-Filipino Cup champions: Sunkist Orange Juicers
- All-Filipino Cup runners-up: Alaska Milkmen
- Commissioner's Cup champions: Sunkist Orange Juicers
- Commissioner's Cup runners-up: Alaska Milkmen
- Governors Cup champions: Alaska Milkmen
- Governors Cup runners-up: San Miguel Beermen

Seasons
- ← 1994 1996 →

The 1995 PBA season was the 21st season of the Philippine Basketball Association (PBA).

== Season highlights ==
- Ramon Fernandez, one of the remaining pioneer players in the league announced his retirement on February 17. His #19 jersey was retired by the San Miguel Beermen in a ceremony held at the San Miguel Corporation offices in Mandaluyong.
- The league returned to the Araneta Coliseum after a decade of absence with the scheduled games on Friday being held at the Big Dome.
- The PBA All-star game returned to its old format of Veterans vs Rookies/Sophomores/Juniors team, also the All-Star event was moved in the month of July with the first-ever PBA fans day held at the Araneta Coliseum a week before the annual all-star game.
- A mid-1990s rivalry was born between the Sunkist Orange Juicers and the Alaska Milkmen, the two teams battled in two memorable finals for the season. The Orange Juicers had won the first two conferences but failed in its bid to win the Grandslam with the Alaska Milkmen taking home the Third Conference trophy.
- Vergel Meneses of Sunkist was the season's best, winning the prestigious MVP Award as well as the All-Star MVP and Best Player of the Conference in the Juicers' two straight championships.

== Rule changes ==
The PBA board approved the rule changes for implementation starting this season:

- The shot clock was reduced to 24 seconds from the previous 25 second limit. The 25 second shot clock was implemented since the league started in 1975 due to a limitation of the shot clock used at the Araneta Coliseum where it can only be set in 5 second intervals.
- The first two minutes of each quarter will be played in "running time". The clock will only be stopped on fouls and violations.
- Teams will now have six 90-second regular timeouts and one 20-second timeout for the eliminations and semifinals.
- Substitutions during free throw situations are only allowed before the last free throw attempt.
- Foul shooters are allowed to shoot their first free throw even if the other players are not yet in position in the lines bordering the painted area.

== Opening ceremonies ==
The muses for the participating teams are as follows:

Team	Muse
Alaska Milkmen	Tet Legacion
Ginebra San Miguel	Charlene Gonzales
Pepsi Mega Bottlers	Anna Gonzales
Purefoods Tender Juicy Hotdogs	Roselle Nava
San Miguel Beermen	Shiela Lang and Gil Baltazar
Shell Rimula X Turbo Chargers	Cesca La'O
Sta. Lucia Realtors	Sheila Marie Dizon (Ms.Tourism)
Sunkist Orange Juicers	Sheryl Cruz

== Champions ==
- All-Filipino Cup: Sunkist Orange Juicers
- Commissioner's Cup: Sunkist Orange Juicers
- Governor's Cup: Alaska Milkmen
- Team with best win–loss percentage: Sunkist Orange Juicers (49–23, .681)
- Best Team of the Year: Sunkist Orange Juicers (1st & Final)

== All-Filipino Cup ==
=== Elimination round ===
Pos	Team	W	L	PCT	GB	Qualification
1	Sunkist Orange Juicers	7	3	.700	—	Semifinal round
2	Shell Rimula X Turbo Chargers	6	4	.600	1	Semifinal round
3	Alaska Milkmen	5	5	.500	2	Semifinal round
4	Sta. Lucia Realtors	5	5	.500	2	Semifinal round
5	Purefoods Tender Juicy Hotdogs	5	5	.500	2	Semifinal round
6	San Miguel Beermen	4	6	.400	3	
7	Pepsi Mega Bottlers	4	6	.400	3	
8	Ginebra San Miguel	4	6	.400	3	

=== Semifinal round ===
Overall standings
Pos	Team	W	L	PCT	GB	Qualification
1	Sunkist Orange Juicers	13	5	.722	—	Advance to the finals (Note: If a team outside the top two teams wins at least five semifinal round games, then it and the second-placed team will playoff for the last finals berth; otherwise, the top 2 teams qualify outright.)
2	Alaska Milkmen	10	8	.556 (Note: Head-to-head record: Alaska 2–1 Purefoods)	3	Guaranteed finals berth playoff
3	Purefoods Tender Juicy Hotdogs	10	8	.556	3	Qualify to finals berth playoff
4	Sta. Lucia Realtors	9	9	.500	4	Proceed to third-place playoffs
5	Shell Rimula X Turbo Chargers	6	12	.333	7	

Notes:

Semifinal round standings
Pos	Team	W	L	Qualification
1	Sunkist Orange Juicers	6	2	
2	Alaska Milkmen	5	3	
3	Purefoods Tender Juicy Hotdogs	5	3	Qualify to finals berth playoff (Note: Sunkist advanced to the finals as #1 seeded team, Alaska qualified to the finals berth playoff as #2 seeded team; finals berth playoff: Alaska 115–89 Purefoods)
4	Sta. Lucia Realtors	4	4	
5	Shell Rimula X Turbo Chargers	0	8	

=== Third place playoffs ===
Team 1	Series	Team 2	Game 1	Game 2	Game 3
(3) Purefoods Tender Juicy Hotdogs	0–2	(4) Sta. Lucia Realtors	89–90	87–89	—

=== Finals ===
Team 1	Series	Team 2	Game 1	Game 2	Game 3	Game 4	Game 5	Game 6	Game 7
(1) Sunkist Orange Juicers	4–3	(2) Alaska Milkmen	104–110	92–85	98–92	88–94	95–90	86–92	87–78 (OT)

- Best Player of the Conference: Vergel Meneses (Sunkist)

== Commissioner's Cup ==
=== Elimination round ===
Pos	Team	W	L	PCT	GB	Qualification
1	Sunkist Orange Juicers	9	1	.900	—	Quarterfinal round
2	Sta. Lucia Realtors	8	2	.800	1	Quarterfinal round
3	Alaska Milkmen	7	3	.700	2	Quarterfinal round
4	Purefoods Tender Juicy Hotdogs	6	4	.600	3	Quarterfinal round
5	San Miguel Beermen	6	4	.600	3	Quarterfinal round
6	Formula Shell Gas Kings	2	8	.200	7	Quarterfinal round
7	Pepsi Mega Bottlers	1	9	.100	8	
8	Ginebra San Miguel	1	9	.100	8	

=== Quarterfinal round ===
Pos	Team	W	L	PCT	GB	Qualification
1	Sunkist Orange Juicers	12	3	.800	—	Semifinals
2	Sta. Lucia Realtors	10	5	.667 (Note: Head-to-head record: Sta. Lucia 3–0 Alaska)	2	Semifinals
3	Alaska Milkmen	10	5	.667	2	Semifinals
4	Purefoods Tender Juicy Hotdogs	9	6	.600	3	Semifinals
5	San Miguel Beermen	8	7	.533	4	
6	Formula Shell Gas Kings	4	11	.267	8	

=== Playoffs ===
Semifinals (Best-of-5)
1	Sunkist	3
4	Purefoods	2
2	Sta. Lucia	0
3	Alaska	3

Finals (Best-of-7)
1	Sunkist	4
3	Alaska	2
Third place playoffs (Best-of-3)
4	Purefoods	0
2	Sta. Lucia	2

==== Semifinals ====
Team 1	Series	Team 2	Game 1	Game 2	Game 3	Game 4	Game 5
(1) Sunkist Orange Juicers	3–0	(4) Purefoods Tender Juicy Hotdogs	85–83	85–92	100–97	80–101	105–99
(2) Sta. Lucia Realtors	3–1	(3) Alaska Milkmen	91–107	110–114	94–99	—	—

==== Third place playoffs ====
Team 1	Series	Team 2	Game 1	Game 2	Game 3
(2) Sta. Lucia Realtors	2–0	(4) Purefoods Tender Juicy Hotdogs	99–88	101–89	—

==== Finals ====
Team 1	Series	Team 2	Game 1	Game 2	Game 3	Game 4	Game 5	Game 6	Game 7
(1) Sunkist Orange Juicers	4–2	(3) Alaska Milkmen	112–106 (OT)	99–105	99–87	95–93	93–114	106–87	—

- Best Player of the Conference: Vergel Meneses (Sunkist)
- Best Import of the Conference: Ronnie Grandison (Sunkist)

== Governors' Cup ==
=== Elimination round ===
Pos	Team	W	L	PCT	GB	Qualification
1	Sunkist Orange Juicers	8	2	.800	—	Semifinal round
2	Purefoods Tender Juicy Hotdogs	7	3	.700	1	Semifinal round
3	Alaska Milkmen	7	3	.700	1	Semifinal round
4	San Miguel Beermen	6	4	.600	2	Semifinal round
5	Formula Shell Zoom Masters	6	4	.600	2	Semifinal round
6	Sta. Lucia Realtors	4	6	.400	4	
7	Pepsi Mega Bottlers	2	8	.200	6	
8	Ginebra San Miguel	0	10	.000	8	

=== Semifinal round ===
Overall standings
Pos	Team	W	L	PCT	GB	Qualification
1	Alaska Milkmen	13	5	.722	—	Advance to the Finals
2	San Miguel Beermen	12	6	.667	1	Advance to the Finals
3	Sunkist Orange Juicers	11	7	.611	2	Proceed to third place playoffs
4	Formula Shell Zoom Masters	9	9	.500 (Note: Head-to-head record: Shell 2–1 Purefoods)	4	Proceed to third place playoffs
5	Purefoods Tender Juicy Hotdogs	9	9	.500	4	

Notes:

Semifinal round standings
Pos	Team	W	L
1	Alaska Milkmen	6	2
2	San Miguel Beermen	6	2
3	Sunkist Orange Juicers	3	5
4	Formula Shell Zoom Masters	3	5
5	Purefoods Tender Juicy Hotdogs	2	6

=== Third place playoffs ===
Team 1	Series	Team 2	Game 1	Game 2	Game 3
(3) Sunkist Orange Juicers	2–1	(4) Formula Shell Zoom Masters	107–97	107–114	110–92

=== Finals ===
Team 1	Series	Team 2	Game 1	Game 2	Game 3	Game 4	Game 5	Game 6	Game 7
(1) Alaska Milkmen	4–3	(2) San Miguel Beermen	93–85	90–102	110–96	100–108	110–117 (2OT)	94–86	99–86

- Best Player of the Conference: Allan Caidic (San Miguel)
- Best Import of the Conference: Stevin Smith (Sunkist)

== Awards ==
- Most Valuable Player: Vergel Meneses (Sunkist)
- Rookie of the Year: Jeffrey Cariaso (Alaska)
- Sportsmanship Award: Rey Evangelista (Purefoods)
- Most Improved Player: Bonel Balingit (Sunkist)
- Defensive Player of the Year: Art dela Cruz (San Miguel)
- Mythical Five:
  - Johnny Abarrientos (Alaska)
  - Bong Hawkins (Alaska)
  - Allan Caidic (San Miguel)
  - Benjie Paras (Shell)
  - Vergel Meneses (Sunkist)
- Mythical Second Team:
  - Boybits Victoria (Sunkist)
  - Jojo Lastimosa (Alaska)
  - Bonel Balingit (Sunkist)
  - Alvin Patrimonio (Purefoods)
  - Nelson Asaytono (Sunkist)
- All Defensive Team:
  - Jerry Codiñera (Purefoods)
  - Glenn Capacio (Purefoods)
  - Chris Jackson (Sta. Lucia)
  - Elpidio Villamin (Sunkist)
  - Art dela Cruz (San Miguel)

=== Awards given by the PBA Press Corps ===
- Coach of the Year: Derrick Pumaren (Sunkist)
- Mr. Quality Minutes: Porfirio "Jun" Marzan (Shell)
- Executive of the Year: Elmer Yanga (Swift)
- Comeback Player of the Year: Elpidio Villamin (Sunkist)
- Referee of the Year: Ernesto de Leon

== Board of Governors ==
- Emilio Bernardino (Commissioner)
- Ruben Cleofe (Secretary)
- Jose Concepcion III (Chairman, Republic Flour Mills Corp.)
- Teodoro Dimayuga (Vice-Chairman, Purefoods Corp.)
- Nazario Avendaño (Treasurer, San Miguel Corp.)
- Wilfred Steven Uytengsu (General Milling Corp.)
- Eliseo Santiago (Pilipinas Shell Petroleum Corp.)
- Vicente Santos (Sta. Lucia Realty and Development, Inc)
- Luis Lorenzo, Sr (Pepsi Cola Products Philippines, Inc)
- Bernabe Navarro (La Tondeña Distillers, Inc)

== Cumulative standings ==
Pos	Team	Pld	W	L	PCT	Best finish
1	Sunkist Orange Juicers	72	49	23	.681	Champions
2	Alaska Milkmen	75	46	29	.613	Champions
3	San Miguel Beermen	50	27	23	.540	Finalist
4	Sta. Lucia Realtors	49	26	23	.531	Third place
5	Purefoods Tender Juicy Hotdogs	60	30	30	.500	Semifinalist
6	Shell Rimula X Turbo Chargers / Formula Shell Gas Kings / Zoom Masters	52	19	33	.365	Semifinalist
7	Pepsi Mega Bottlers	30	7	23	.233	Elimination round
8	Ginebra San Miguel	30	5	25	.167	Elimination round

=== Elimination round ===
Pos	Team	Pld	W	L	PCT
1	Sunkist Orange Juicers	30	24	6	.800
2	Alaska Milkmen	30	19	11	.633
3	Purefoods Tender Juicy Hotdogs	30	18	12	.600
4	Sta. Lucia Realtors	30	17	13	.567
5	San Miguel Beermen	30	16	14	.533
6	Shell Rimula X Turbo Chargers / Formula Shell Gas Kings / Zoom Masters	30	14	16	.467
7	Pepsi Mega Bottlers	30	7	23	.233
8	Ginebra San Miguel	30	5	25	.167

=== Playoffs ===
Pos	Team	Pld	W	L
1	Alaska Milkmen	45	27	18
2	Sunkist Orange Juicers	42	25	17
3	Purefoods Tender Juicy Hotdogs	30	12	18
4	San Miguel Beermen	20	11	9
5	Sta. Lucia Realtors	19	9	10
6	Shell Rimula X Turbo Chargers / Formula Shell Gas Kings / Zoom Masters	22	5	17
7	Ginebra San Miguel	0	0	0
8	Pepsi Mega Bottlers	0	0	0
