= Pop Cola Panthers =

Philippine basketball team owned by RFM Corporation

- Founded: 1990
- Dissolved: Sold in 2001
- History: Pop Cola Sizzlers (1990, 1997); Sarsi Sizzlers (1990); Diet Sarsi Sizzlers (1991); Swift Mighty Meaty Hotdogs (1991–1993); Swift Mighty Meaties (1994); Sunkist Orange Juicers (1995–1996, 2000); Sunkist Orange Bottlers (1996); Pop Cola Bottlers (1997); Pop Cola 800s (1998–2000); Pop Cola Panthers (2000–2001); Swift Panthers (2000)
- Team colors: Swift, Diet Sarsi and Pop Cola; Blue, Red, White Sunkist; Orange, Blue, White
- Company: RFM Corporation
- Head coach: Yeng Guiao, Derrick Pumaren, Turo Valenzona, Norman Black, Chot Reyes
- Ownership: Jose Ma. "Joey" A. Concepcion III
- Championships: 4 championships 1992 Third Conference; 1993 Commissioner's; 1995 All-Filipino; 1995 Commissioner's 7 Finals Appearances
Light uniform	Dark uniform

The Pop Cola Panthers were a professional basketball team that played in the Philippine Basketball Association from 1990-2001. The franchise was owned by RFM Corporation. In 2001, when RFM Corporation sold its entire stake in Cosmos Bottling Corporation to Coca-Cola Bottlers Philippines, Inc. (CCBPI), the PBA franchise was included in the transaction. Upon ownership by CCBPI, the PBA franchise renamed the Coca-Cola Tigers beginning the 2002 PBA season and was considered as an expansion team.

The franchise also played under the names Pop Cola/Diet Sarsi Sizzlers, Swift Mighty Meaty Hotdogs, Swift Mighty Meaties, Sunkist Orange Juicers/Bottlers and Pop Cola 800s.

== History ==
Pop Cola was one of two expansion franchises to enter the league in the 1990 season, joining softdrink rival Pepsi-Cola, increasing the number of member teams in the pro league to eight.

In their 12-year stint in the PBA, they were known as the Pop Cola Sizzlers, Sarsi, Swift Mighty Meaty, Sunkist Orange Juicers, Sunkist Orange Bottlers and Pop Cola 800s. The team has used the Pop Cola name from 1997 until their final season in the PBA in 2001, although the team was known as Sunkist in the 2000 Commissioners Cup and was known as the Swift Panthers for the first few games of the 2001 Governors Cup. Their first finals appearance came in 1991 All-Filipino, as Diet Sarsi, lost to corporate rival Purefoods TJ Hotdogs, 3 games to 2 in a Best of Five finals series. The team's first PBA title came in 1992, when Swift defeated 7-Up four games-to-none to win the PBA Third Conference under head coach Yeng Guiao.

The franchise also fielded one of the dominant imports in PBA history in Tony Harris, who scored a PBA record 105 points for Swift when they defeated Ginebra 151–147 in a game held in Iloilo City on October 10, 1992.

In 1993, Swift traded Jack Tanuan, Ricric Marata and Andy De Guzman for Sta. Lucia in exchange for their former players in their PABL days, Vergel Meneses and Zaldy Realubit, and this gave Swift its second championship in the newly called Commissioners Cup, gaining revenge over their business rival, Purefoods Oodles, 4 games to 2, the Hotdogs were powered by best import Ronnie Thompkins. the team was title-less the following season in which head coach Yeng Guiao decided to moved over to Pepsi Mega, and Derek Pumaren taking over the coaching chores, Swift made it to the finals in the season-ending Governor's Cup, losing to Alaska in six games.

The 1995 season became a banner year for the team. Under the name Sunkist Orange Juicers, the team almost achieved a rare back-to-back winning the All-Filipino and Commissioner's Cup titles before finishing third overall in the season-ending Governor's Cup. The team was bannered by season MVP Vergel Meneses, Bonel Balingit, Boybits Victoria, Kenneth Duremdes and Rudy Distrito (who was banned in 1995 for his infamous hard foul on Alaska rookie Jeffrey Cariaso during the All-Filipino finals series).

Sunkist/Pop Cola suffered hard times in the 1996 and 1997 seasons before their fortunes changed in 1998 when the team won a few third-place finishes under head coach Norman Black, who even played one game during the Commissioner's Cup to lead the 800s to a third-place finish in the said tournament.

Pop Cola suffered two more losing seasons in 1999 and 2000 seasons but had a decent run in their final PBA season in 2001 under head coach Chot Reyes, copping third place honors in the All-Filipino Conference.

The franchise ended when RFM Corporation sold its PBA franchise to Coca-Cola Bottlers Philippines, Inc. (CCBPI), in connection to its sale of Cosmos Bottling Corporation to CCBPI in 2001.

== Awards ==
=== Individual awards ===
PBA Most Valuable Player	Finals MVP	PBA Best Player of the Conference
Vergel Meneses - 1995		Vergel Meneses - 1994 Governors', 1995 All-Filipino, 1995 Commissioner's
PBA Rookie of the Year Award	PBA All-Defensive Team	PBA Mythical First Team
	Elpidio Villamin - 1995	Nelson Asaytono - 1992–1993; Al Solis - 1992–1993; Vergel Meneses - 1994–1995
PBA Mythical Second Team	PBA Most Improved Player	PBA Sportsmanship Award
Elpidio Villamin - 1991; Vergel Meneses - 1993; Nelson Asaytono - 1994–1995; Boybits Victoria - 1994–1995; Bonel Balingit - 1995; Rudy Hatfield - 2001	Vergel Meneses - 1993; Bonel Balingit - 1995	
PBA Best Import		
Tony Harris - 1992 Third; Ronnie Thompkins - 1993 Commissioner's; Ronnie Grandison - 1995 Commissioner's; Stevin Smith - 1995 Governors'		

=== PBA Press Corps Individual Awards ===
Executive of the Year	Baby Dalupan Coach of the Year	Defensive Player of the Year
Elmer Yanga - 1993–1995	Derrick Pumaren - 1995	
Bogs Adornado Comeback Player of the Year	Mr. Quality Minutes	All-Rookie Team
Elpidio Villamin - 1995		

=== All-Star Weekend ===
All Star MVP	Obstacle Challenge	Three-point Shootout	Slam Dunk Contest
Vergel Meneses - 1995, 1998; Kenneth Duremdes - 1996	Jack Santiago - 1996	Ric-Ric Marata - 1996; Jasper Ocampo - 1998–1999	Vergel Meneses - 1993

== Notable players ==
=== PBA's 25 greatest players ===
- Ato Agustin - "The Atomic Bomb"
- Johnny Abarrientos #14 - "The Flying A"
- Kenneth Duremdes - "Captain Marbel"
- Bernie Fabiosa #51 - "The Sultan of Swipe" played his final year in the league with the team in 1991.
- Jojo Lastimosa - "Jolas"
- Vergel Meneses - "The Aerial Voyager"

=== Other notable players ===
- William Antonio
- Nelson Asaytono
- Bonel Balingit
- Nic Belasco
- Sonny Cabatu
- Andy De Guzman
- Rudy Distrito
- Boyet Fernandez
- Pido Jarencio
- Dwight Lago
- Joey Loyzaga
- Ric-Ric Marata
- Ali Peek
- Zaldy Realubit
- Elmer Reyes
- Eric Reyes
- Terry Saldaña
- Al Solis
- Jack Tanuan
- Boybits Victoria
- Elpidio Villamin
- Jasper Ocampo

=== Imports ===
- Michael Anderson
- Dexter Boney
- David Booth
- Marques Bragg
- Norris Coleman
- Jevon Crudup
- Jay Edwards
- Harold Ellis
- Rosell Ellis
- Sherell Ford
- Tremaine Fowlkes
- Paul Graham
- Ronnie Grandison
- Sean Green
- Tony Harris
- Shawn Harvey
- David Henderson
- Sean Higgins
- Byron Houston
- Alfredrick Hughes
- Herb Jones
- Marcus Liberty
- Lewis Lloyd
- Cedric McCullough
- Lester Neal
- Victor Page
- Galen Robinson
- Stan Rose
- Kenny Sanders
- Jason Sasser
- Stevin Smith
- Carl Thomas
- Ronnie Thompkins
- Bernard Thompson
- Marcus Timmons
- Kelvin Upshaw
- Jamie Watson
- Bryatt Vann

Preceded by (start)	PBA teams genealogies 1990-2001	Succeeded by Coca-Cola Tigers
