= 1994 PBA Commissioner's Cup =

- Duration: June 17 – September 9, 1994
- TV partner(s): Vintage Sports (PTV)

Finals
- Champions: Purefoods TJ Hotdogs
- Runners-up: Alaska Milkmen

Awards
- Best Player: Alvin Patrimonio (Purefoods TJ Hotdogs)
- Best Import: Kenny Redfield (Purefoods TJ Hotdogs)

PBA Commissioner's Cup chronology
- < 1993 1995 >

PBA conference chronology
- < 1994 All-Filipino 1994 Governors' >

The 1994 Philippine Basketball Association (PBA) Commissioner's Cup was the second conference of the 1994 PBA season. It started on June 17 and ended on September 9, 1994. The tournament is an import-laden format, which requires an import or a pure-foreign player for each team.

== Format ==
The following format will be observed for the duration of the conference:

- The teams were divided into 2 groups.

Group A:

1. Purefoods TJ Hotdogs
2. San Miguel Beermen
3. Sta. Lucia Realtors
4. Tondeña 65 Rhum Masters

Group B:

1. Alaska Milkmen
2. Pepsi Mega Bottlers
3. Shell Rimula X
4. Swift Mighty Meaty Hotdogs

- Teams in a group will play against each other once and against teams in the other group twice; 11 games per team; Teams are then seeded by basis on win–loss records. Ties are broken among point differentials of the tied teams. Standings will be determined in one league table; teams do not qualify by basis of groupings.
- The top five teams after the eliminations will advance to the semifinals.
- Semifinals will be two round robin affairs with the remaining teams. Results from the elimination round will be carried over. A playoff incentive for a finals berth will be given to the team that will win at least five of their eight semifinal games.
- The top two teams (or the top team and the winner of the playoff incentive) will face each other in a best-of-seven championship series. The next two teams will qualify for a best-of-five playoff for third place.

== Elimination round ==
=== Team standings ===
Pos	Team	W	L	PCT	GB	Qualification
1	Alaska Milkmen	9	2	.818	—	Semifinal round
2	Purefoods Tender Juicy Hotdogs	7	4	.636	2	Semifinal round
3	San Miguel Beermen	6	5	.545	3	Semifinal round
4	Swift Mighty Meaties	6	5	.545	3	Semifinal round
5	Shell Rimula X Turbo Chargers	6	5	.545	3	Semifinal round
6	Tondeña 65 Rhum Masters	5	6	.455	4	
7	Sta. Lucia Realtors	3	8	.273	6	
8	Pepsi Mega Bottlers	2	9	.182	7	

== Semifinal round ==
=== Team standings ===
Overall standings
Pos	Team	W	L	PCT	GB	Qualification
1	Alaska Milkmen	14	5	.737	—	Advance to the finals
2	Purefoods Tender Juicy Hotdogs	13	6	.684	1	Advance to the finals
3	Swift Mighty Meaties	10	9	.526	4	Proceed to third-place playoffs
4	San Miguel Beermen	9	10	.474	5	Proceed to third-place playoffs
5	Shell Rimula X Turbo Chargers	8	11	.421	6	

Semifinal round standings
Pos	Team	W	L
1	Purefoods Tender Juicy Hotdogs	6	2
2	Alaska Milkmen	5	3
3	Swift Mighty Meaties	4	4
4	San Miguel Beermen	3	5
5	Shell Rimula X Turbo Chargers	2	6

== Third place playoffs ==
Vintage

August 30

Swift Mighty Meaty Hotdogs def by, San Miguel Beermen
San Miguel forfeits series in favor of Swift

Cuneta Astrodome, Pasay

After winning Game 1 of their series for third place against Swift on August 30, the San Miguel Beermen forfeited the third-place trophy to the Mighty Meaties and requested the PBA for them to carry the national colors for the remaining games as part of their preparation for the upcoming Asian Games. Amateur standouts Marlou Aquino, Kenneth Duremdes, Dennis Espino, Jeffrey Cariaso and E.J. Feihl joined the team.

== Philippine national team tune-up series ==
Vintage

September 2

RP Team-San Miguel 100, Swift Mighty Meaty Hotdogs 103

Cuneta Astrodome, Pasay

Vintage

September 4

RP Team-San Miguel 111, Swift Mighty Meaty Hotdogs 104

Cuneta Astrodome, Pasay

Vintage

September 6

RP Team-San Miguel 79, Swift Mighty Meaty Hotdogs 83

Cuneta Astrodome, Pasay

Vintage

September 9

RP Team-San Miguel 83, Swift Mighty Meaty Hotdogs 82

Cuneta Astrodome, Pasay

RP-San Miguel split four games with Swift, and played Shell for their last tune-up game.

== Finals ==
Vintage

August 30

Purefoods TJ Hotdogs 97, Alaska Milkmen 92

Cuneta Astrodome, Pasay

Vintage

September 2

Purefoods TJ Hotdogs 84, Alaska Milkmen 79

Cuneta Astrodome, Pasay

Vintage

September 4

Purefoods TJ Hotdogs 92, Alaska Milkmen 89

Cuneta Astrodome, Pasay

Vintage

September 6

Purefoods TJ Hotdogs 90, Alaska Milkmen 91

Cuneta Astrodome, Pasay

Vintage

September 9

Purefoods TJ Hotdogs 94, Alaska Milkmen 79
Purefoods wins series, 4–1

Cuneta Astrodome, Pasay
