= 1994 PBA All-Filipino Cup =

- Duration: March 6 – May 27, 1994
- TV partner(s): Vintage Sports (PTV)

Finals
- Champions: San Miguel Beermen
- Runners-up: Coney Island Ice Cream Stars

Awards
- Best Player: Jerry Codiñera (Coney Island Ice Cream Stars)

PBA All-Filipino Cup chronology
- < 1993 1995 >

PBA conference chronology
- < 1993 Governors' 1994 Commissioner's >

The 1994 Philippine Basketball Association (PBA) All-Filipino Cup was the first conference of the 1994 PBA season. It started on March 6 and ended on May 27, 1994. The tournament is an All-Filipino format, which doesn't require an import or a pure-foreign player for each team.

== Format ==
The following format will be observed for the duration of the conference:

- The teams were divided into 2 groups.

Group A:

1. Coney Island Ice Cream Stars
2. Sta. Lucia Realtors
3. Tondeña 65 Rhum Masters
4. San Miguel Beermen

Group B:

1. Alaska Milkmen
2. Swift Mighty Meaty Hotdogs
3. Shell Rimula X Turbo Chargers
4. Pepsi Mega Bottlers

- Teams in a group will play against each other twice and against teams in the other group once; 10 games per team; Teams are then seeded by basis on win–loss records. Ties are broken among point differentials of the tied teams. Standings will be determined in one league table; teams do not qualify by basis of groupings.
- The top five teams after the eliminations will advance to the semifinals.
- Semifinals will be two round robin affairs with the remaining teams. Results from the elimination round will be carried over. A playoff incentive for a finals berth will be given to the team that will win at least five of their eight semifinal games.
- The top two teams (or the top team and the winner of the playoff incentive) will face each other in a best-of-seven championship series. The next two teams will qualify for a best-of-five playoff for third place.

== Elimination round ==
=== Team standings ===
Pos	Team	W	L	PCT	GB	Qualification
1	San Miguel Beermen	8	2	.800	—	Semifinal round
2	Coney Island Ice Cream Stars	7	3	.700	1	Semifinal round
3	Alaska Milkmen	6	4	.600	2	Semifinal round
4	Sta. Lucia Realtors	6	4	.600	2	Semifinal round
5	Swift Mighty Meaties	5	5	.500	3	Semifinal round
6	Shell Rimula X Turbo Chargers	3	7	.300	5	
7	Pepsi Mega Bottlers	3	7	.300	5	
8	Tondeña 65 Rhum Masters	2	8	.200	6	

== Semifinal round ==
=== Team standings ===
- Cumulative standings

Overall standings
Pos	Team	W	L	PCT	GB	Qualification
1	San Miguel Beermen	12	6	.667 (Note: Head-to-head record: San Miguel 2–2 Coney Island; San Miguel +19, Coney Island −19)	—	Advance to the finals (Note: If a team outside the top two teams wins at least five semifinal round games, then it and the second-placed team will playoff for the last finals berth; otherwise, the top 2 teams qualify outright.)
2	Coney Island Ice Cream Stars	12	6	.667	—	Guaranteed finals berth playoff
3	Swift Mighty Meaties	11	7	.611	1	Qualify to finals berth playoff
4	Alaska Milkmen	10	8	.556	2	Proceed to third-place playoffs
5	Sta. Lucia Realtors	7	11	.389	5	

Notes:

Semifinal round standings
Pos	Team	W	L	Qualification
1	Swift Mighty Meaties	6	2	Qualify to finals berth playoff (Note: Coney Island qualified to the finals berth playoff as #2 seeded team; finals berth playoff: Coney Island 86–74 Swift)
2	Coney Island Ice Cream Stars	5	3	
3	San Miguel Beermen	4	4	
4	Alaska Milkmen	4	4	
5	Sta. Lucia Realtors	1	7	

== Finals berth playoff ==
Vintage

May 13

Coney Island Ice Cream Stars 86, Swift Mighty Meaty Hotdogs 74

Cuneta Astrodome, Pasay

== Third place playoffs ==
Vintage

May 15

Swift Mighty Meaty Hotdogs 93, Alaska Milkmen 97

Cuneta Astrodome, Pasay

Vintage

May 17

Swift Mighty Meaty Hotdogs 105, Alaska Milkmen 102

Cuneta Astrodome, Pasay

Vintage

May 20

Swift Mighty Meaty Hotdogs 115, Alaska Milkmen 118 (OT)

Cuneta Astrodome, Pasay

Vintage

May 22

Swift Mighty Meaty Hotdogs 87, Alaska Milkmen 84

Cuneta Astrodome, Pasay

Vintage

May 24

Swift Mighty Meaty Hotdogs 76, Alaska Milkmen 90
Alaska wins series, 3–2

Cuneta Astrodome, Pasay

== Finals ==
Vintage

May 15

San Miguel Beermen 95, Coney Island Ice Cream Stars 99

Cuneta Astrodome, Pasay

Vintage

May 17

San Miguel Beermen 108, Coney Island Ice Cream Stars 95

Cuneta Astrodome, Pasay

Vintage

May 20

San Miguel Beermen 87, Coney Island Ice Cream Stars 77

Cuneta Astrodome, Pasay

Vintage

May 22

San Miguel Beermen 93, Coney Island Ice Cream Stars 84

Cuneta Astrodome, Pasay

Vintage

May 24

San Miguel Beermen 86, Coney Island Ice Cream Stars 97

Cuneta Astrodome, Pasay

Vintage

May 27

San Miguel Beermen 85, Coney Island Ice Cream Stars 74
San Miguel wins series, 4–2

Cuneta Astrodome, Pasay
