= 1994 PBA Governors' Cup =

1994 PBA Governors Cup
- Duration: September 27 – December 18, 1994
- TV partner(s): Vintage Sports (PTV)

Finals
- Champions: Alaska Milkmen
- Runners-up: Swift Mighty Meaties

Awards
- Best Player: Vergel Meneses (Swift Mighty Meaties)
- Best Import: Ronnie Coleman (Pepsi Mega Bottlers)

PBA Governors Cup chronology
- < 1993 1995 >

PBA conference chronology
- < 1994 Commissioner's 1995 All-Filipino >

The 1994 Philippine Basketball Association (PBA) Governors Cup was the third conference of the 1994 PBA season. It started on September 27 and ended on December 18, 1994. The tournament had an import-laden format, requiring an import or a pure-foreign player for each team.

The two champions in the first two conferences were seeded in the semifinal round by virtue of San Miguel Beer representing the Philippine national team in the Hiroshima Asian Games and Commissioner's Cup champion Purefoods Tender Juicy Hotdogs lending three of its key players to the national quintet.

== Format ==
The following format will be observed for the duration of the conference:

- Double-round robin eliminations among 6 teams; total of 10 games; teams are then seeded by basis on win–loss records.
- The top four teams qualified in the semifinal round along with the two-seeded teams in the semifinals; San Miguel Beer and Purefoods.
- Semifinals will be two round robin affairs with standings back to zero.
- The top two teams in the semifinals advance to the best-of-seven finals. The last two teams dispute the third-place trophy in a best-of-five playoff.

== Elimination round ==
=== Team standings ===
Pos	Team	W	L	PCT	GB	Qualification
1	Pepsi Mega Bottlers	7	3	.700	—	Semifinal round
2	Alaska Milkmen	6	4	.600	1	Semifinal round
3	Swift Mighty Meaties	6	4	.600	1	Semifinal round
4	Shell Rimula X Turbo Chargers	5	5	.500 (Note: Semifinal berth playoff: Shell 125–123 Tondeña 65 (OT))	2	Semifinal round
5	Tondeña 65 Rhum Masters	5	5	.500	2	
6	Sta. Lucia Realtors	1	5	.167	4	

Source: Manila Standard

== Semifinal berth playoff ==
Vintage

October 30

recap

Shell Rimula X Turbo Chargers 125, Tondeña 65 Rhum Masters 123 (OT)

Cuneta Astrodome, Pasay

== Semifinals ==
=== Team standings ===
Pos	Team	W	L	PCT	GB	Qualification
1	Alaska Milkmen	7	3	.700	—	Advance to the Finals
2	Swift Mighty Meaties	7	3	.700	—	Advance to the Finals
3	Pepsi Mega Bottlers	5	5	.500	2	Proceed to third-place playoffs
4	Purefoods Tender Juicy Hotdogs	4	6	.400	3	Proceed to third-place playoffs
5	San Miguel Beermen	4	6	.400	3	
6	Shell Rimula X Turbo Chargers	3	7	.300	4	

== Third place playoffs ==
Vintage

December 6

Pepsi Mega Bottlers 91, Purefoods TJ Hotdogs 102

Cuneta Astrodome, Pasay

Vintage

December 9

Pepsi Mega Bottlers 105, Purefoods TJ Hotdogs 102

Cuneta Astrodome, Pasay

Vintage

December 13

Pepsi Mega Bottlers 119, Purefoods TJ Hotdogs 105

Cuneta Astrodome, Pasay

Vintage

December 16

Pepsi Mega Bottlers 110, Purefoods TJ Hotdogs 105
Pepsi Mega wins series, 3–1

Cuneta Astrodome, Pasay

== Finals ==
Vintage

December 6

Alaska Milkmen 85, Swift Mighty Meaty Hotdogs 89

Cuneta Astrodome, Pasay

Vintage

December 9

Alaska Milkmen 119, Swift Mighty Meaty Hotdogs 111

Cuneta Astrodome, Pasay

Vintage

December 11

Alaska Milkmen 92, Swift Mighty Meaty Hotdogs 87

Cuneta Astrodome, Pasay

Vintage

December 13

Alaska Milkmen 90, Swift Mighty Meaty Hotdogs 85

Cuneta Astrodome, Pasay

Vintage

December 16

Alaska Milkmen 108, Swift Mighty Meaty Hotdogs 123

Cuneta Astrodome, Pasay

Vintage

December 18

Alaska Milkmen 114, Swift Mighty Meaty Hotdogs 92
Alaska wins series, 4–2

Cuneta Astrodome, Pasay
