= 1994 PBA Governors' Cup finals =

Basketball tournament

1994 PBA Governors Cup finals
Team	Coach	Wins
Alaska Milkmen	Tim Cone	4
Swift Mighty Meaty Hotdogs	Derrick Pumaren	2
- Dates: December 6–18, 1994
- Television: Vintage Sports (PTV)
- Radio network: DZRH

PBA Governors Cup finals chronology
- < 1993 1995 >

PBA finals chronology
- < 1994 Commissioner's 1995 All-Filipino >

The 1994 PBA Governors Cup finals was the best-of-7 championship series of the 1994 PBA Governors Cup, and the conclusion of the conference playoffs. The Alaska Milkmen and Swift Mighty Meaty Hotdogs played for the 59th championship contested by the league.

The Alaska Milkmen won their 2nd PBA title with a 4–2 series victory over the Swift Mighty Meaty Hotdogs.

== Qualification ==
Alaska		Swift
Finished 6–4 (.600), tied for 2nd	Eliminations	Finished 6–4 (.600), tied for 2nd
Finished 7–3 (.700), tied for 1st	Semifinals	Finished 7–3 (.700), tied for 1st

== Series scoring summary ==
Team	Game 1	Game 2	Game 3	Game 4	Game 5	Game 6	Wins
Alaska	85	119	92	90	108	114	4
Swift	89	111	87	85	123	92	2
Venue	Cuneta	Cuneta	Cuneta	Cuneta	Cuneta	Cuneta

== Games summary ==
=== Game 1 ===
Vintage

December 6

Alaska Milkmen 85, Swift Mighty Meaty Hotdogs 89
Pts: Sean Chambers 28	Pts: Vergel Meneses 24
Swift leads series, 1–0

Cuneta Astrodome, Pasay

The Meaties without enforcer Rudy Distrito, who is serving a five-game suspension, held an imposing 77–61 spread in the fourth quarter and despite blowing a 16-point lead, hang tough when the Milkmen with Johnny Abarrientos orchestrating the plays, came to within 85–86, only to falter in the end.

=== Game 2 ===
Vintage

December 9

Alaska Milkmen 119, Swift Mighty Meaty Hotdogs 111
Pts: Sean Chambers 37 Bong Hawkins 27	Pts: Herb Jones 38
Series tied, 1–1

Cuneta Astrodome, Pasay

=== Game 3 ===
Vintage

December 11

Alaska Milkmen 92, Swift Mighty Meaty Hotdogs 87
Scoring by quarter: 27–21, 21–34, 22–16, 22–16
Pts: Sean Chambers 24	Pts: Nelson Asaytono 26
Alaska leads series, 2–1

Cuneta Astrodome, Pasay

Alaska played hard-nosed defense, strangled the meaties in the endgame. Alex Araneta nearly lost the ball but scored to shove the Milkmen ahead, 86–84. After Swift was forced into a turnover, Sean Chambers' running shot pushed Alaska on top by four with less than a minute remaining. The Mighty Meaties opened a 12-point lead early in the third quarter at 60–48, but the Milkmen battled back and were only trailing by a point, 70–71, going into the final period.

=== Game 4 ===
Vintage

December 13

Alaska Milkmen 90, Swift Mighty Meaty Hotdogs 85
Pts: Sean Chambers 36	Pts: Herb Jones 28
Alaska leads series, 3–1

Cuneta Astrodome, Pasay

In almost a repeat of Game three, a 12–4 tear by Alaska in the last five minutes iced Swift's downfall.

=== Game 5 ===
Vintage

December 16

Alaska Milkmen 108, Swift Mighty Meaty Hotdogs 123
Scoring by quarter: 32–24, 26–45, 29–24, 21–30
Pts: Sean Chambers 26	Pts: Vergel Meneses 28
Alaska leads series, 3–2

Cuneta Astrodome, Pasay

Alaska took an early 24–12 lead in the first quarter. The Meaties banked on a big second quarter as Rudy Distrito ignited a 9–0 blast that allowed Swift to equalized at 42-all and later turn the tables in the next five minutes in a 16–6 run to take a 58–48 lead, a near free-for-all happened with 30.7 seconds left in the second quarter, Swift leading, 66–55, as Jojo Lastimosa reacted on a hard foul by Swift import Herb Jones that sent him crashing to the floor, action was halted for nearly five minutes and play was resumed after technical fouls were slapped on Jones, Bonel Balingit and Roehl Gomez. The Milkmen came back in the third period to cut the deficit to four, 80–84, but Swift immediately responded to the uprising as Vergel Meneses and Nelson Asaytono went to work and the Meaties opened leads of 19 points, 108–89 in the fourth quarter.

=== Game 6 ===
Vintage

December 18

Alaska Milkmen 114, Swift Mighty Meaty Hotdogs 92
Scoring by quarter: 29–16, 25–31, 24–16, 36–29
Pts: Sean Chambers 38	Pts: Vergel Meneses 26
Alaska wins series, 4–2

Cuneta Astrodome, Pasay

Swift came back from 17 points down in the first quarter to take a 63–62 lead on a short stab by import Herb Jones midway in the third period that turned out to be the Meaties' last taste of the lead as Alaska launched a decisive 16–0 run that broke their backs as the Milkmen zoomed to a 78–63 advantage at the end of the third quarter.

1994 PBA Governors Cup Champions

Alaska Milkmen
Second title

== Rosters ==
Alaska Milkmen roster
Players
Coaches

Pos.	No.	Nat.	Name	Ht.	Wt.
G/F	4	(Philippines)	Merwin Castelo	6 ft 2 in (1.88 m)		San Beda
G	5	(Philippines)	Gilbert Reyes	5 ft 8 in (1.73 m)		Ateneo
G/F	6	(Philippines)	Jojo Lastimosa	6 ft 1 in (1.85 m)		USJ–R
G	7	(Philippines)	Roehl Gomez	6 ft 0 in (1.83 m)		Cebu
G/F	9	(Philippines)	Johnedel Cardel	6 ft 0 in (1.83 m)		De La Salle
C	12	(Philippines)	Dickie Bachmann	6 ft 5 in (1.96 m)		De La Salle
G	14	(Philippines)	Johnny Abarrientos	5 ft 8 in (1.73 m)		Far Eastern
F	16	(Philippines)	Bong Hawkins	6 ft 3 in (1.91 m)		UPHSD
G/F	20	(United States)	Sean Chambers (I)	6 ft 1 in (1.85 m)		Cal Poly
C	24	(Philippines)	Cris Bolado	6 ft 7 in (2.01 m)		National-U
C	32	(Philippines)	Poch Juinio	6 ft 5 in (1.96 m)		UP Diliman
F	34	(Philippines)	Stevenson Solomon	6 ft 4 in (1.93 m)		San Sebastian
C	50	(Philippines)	Alex Araneta	6 ft 6 in (1.98 m)		Ateneo
F	54	(Philippines)	Dondon Ampalayo	6 ft 3 in (1.91 m)		USJ–R

Head coach

- (United States) Tim Cone

Assistant coach(es)

- (Philippines) Joel Banal
- (Philippines) Aric del Rosario

Legend

- (C) Team captain
- (I) Import
- Injured

Swift Mighty Meaties roster
Players
Coaches

Pos.	No.	Nat.	Name	Ht.	Wt.
C	4	(Philippines)	Bonel Balingit	6 ft 9 in (2.06 m)		Visayas
G	8	(Philippines)	Al Solis	5 ft 11 in (1.80 m)		Visayas
G	9	(Philippines)	Boybits Victoria	5 ft 11 in (1.80 m)		San Beda
F	10	(Philippines)	Enrique Reyes	6 ft 4 in (1.93 m)		Ateneo
F	11	(Philippines)	Nelson Asaytono	6 ft 3 in (1.91 m)		Manila
F	13	(Philippines)	Elpidio Villamin	6 ft 2 in (1.88 m)
G	14	(Philippines)	Rudy Distrito	5 ft 11 in (1.80 m)		UE
G	15	(Philippines)	Juancho Estrada	5 ft 11 in (1.80 m)		Adamson
G	16	(Philippines)	Teroy Albarillo	5 ft 10 in (1.78 m)		Mindanao
F	18	(Philippines)	Vergel Meneses	6 ft 3 in (1.91 m)		José Rizal
F	24	(Philippines)	Richard Bognot	6 ft 4 in (1.93 m)
G/F	34	(United States)	Herb Jones (I)	6 ft 2 in (1.88 m)		Cincinnati
C	35	(Philippines)	Zaldy Realubit	6 ft 6 in (1.98 m)		USJ–R

Head coach

- (Philippines) Derrick Pumaren

Assistant coach(es)

- (Philippines) Gabby Velasco

Legend

- (C) Team captain
- (I) Import
- Injured

== Broadcast notes ==
Game	Play-by-play	Analyst
Game 1	Sev Sarmenta	Andy Jao
Game 2		
Game 3		
Game 4		
Game 5		
Game 6		
