= Derrick Pumaren =

Filipino basketball coach

Akari Sparks
- Position: Head coach
- League: WMPBL

Career information
- College: UE
- Coaching career: 1983–present

Career history

Coaching
- 1983–1990: Magnolia/Lagerlite
- 1986–1991: De La Salle
- 1985; 1987–1989: San Miguel Beermen (assistant)
- 1986: Tanduay Rhum Makers (assistant)
- 1986: Magnolia Cheese Makers
- 1989: Philippines
- 1991–1992: Triple-V Foodmasters
- 1990–1994: Pepsi Hotshots/7-Up Uncolas
- 1994–1997: Sunkist Orange Juicers/Pop Cola Bottlers
- 1997: Mobiline Phone Pals (assistant/co-head coach)
- 1998: Sta. Lucia Realtors
- 1999–2000: Purefoods Tender Juicy Hotdogs
- 2001: Tanduay Rhum Masters
- 2002–2003: FedEx Express
- 2004–2008: UE (team consultant)
- 2006–2008: Talk 'N Text Phone Pals
- 2008–2014: Hong Kong (team consultant)
- 2014–2017: UE
- 2018–2019: CEU
- 2020–2022: De La Salle
- 2025–present: Akari Sparks

Career highlights
- As head coach: 2× PBA champion (1995 All-Filipino, 1995 Commissioner's Cup); PBA Coach of the Year (1995); 3× PBA All-Star Game head coach (1993, 1995, 1998); WMPBL champion (2026); 2× UAAP champion (1989, 1990); 9× PBL champion (1986 Founder's Cup, 1987 Maharlika Cup, 1988 Freedom Cup, 1989 Invitational Cup, 1989 Maharlika Cup, 1990 Maharlika Cup, 1991 Challenge Cup, 1991–92 Philippine Cup, 1992 Invitational Cup); PBA D-League champion (2022 Aspirants'); As assistant coach: 7× PBA champion (1986 Reinforced, 1986 All-Filipino, 1987 Reinforced, 1988 Open, 1988 Reinforced, 1989 Open, 1989 All-Filipino, 1989 Reinforced); Grand Slam champion (1989); As player: UAAP champion (1978)
Medals
Men's basketball
Head coach for Philippines
SEA Games
Silver medal – second place	1989 Kuala Lumpur	Team

Frederick "Derrick" Santos Pumaren is a Filipino basketball head coach for Akari Sparks in the Women's Maharlika Pilipinas Basketball League (WMPBL). He coached several teams in the UAAP, PBA, and PBL.

== Playing career ==
=== Collegiate career ===
Pumaren was a member of the UE Red Warriors 1978 championship team.

== Coaching career ==
=== Magnolia (PBL) head coach (1983–1990) ===
As an assistant, Pumaren led the Magnolia to six Philippine Amateur Basketball League championship.

=== Assistant coach (1985–1989) ===
Pumaren was hired an assistant coach for San Miguel Beermen led by then import-coach Norman Black. When the People Power Revolution occurred and the Beermen was left the league for a while, he worked for Tanduay Rhum Makers under coach Arturo Valenzona and won back-to-back championship in 1987, but lost in the third conference and spoiled their chance to swipe the prestigious Grand Slam. He returned as an assistant coach in 1987. When Norman Black returned, this time as a full-time head coach, Pumaren helped the Beermen win four championships, including the 1989 grand slam.

=== Magnolia head coach (1986) ===
In 1986, the Magnolia/SMB returned to the league in the last conference of the season. Pumaren was appointed as head coach, but placed last in the standings.

=== La Salle (1986–1991) ===
Pumaren became the head coach for the De La Salle Green Archers in the UAAP from 1986 to the early 90s, piloting the team to its first UAAP finals appearance in 1988, and first championship in 1989 and repeating in 1990. He also called the shots for the 1991 La Salle team in a controversial UAAP championship game win over FEU in 1991.

=== Philippine team (1989) ===
Pumaren led the Philippine team (RP-5) into a silver finish against Malaysia at the 1989 Kuala Lumpur Southeast Asian Games.

=== Triple-V (1991–1992) ===
Pumaren led Triple-V Restaurant to three PABL championships.

=== Pepsi (1990–1994) ===
Pumaren was hired by Pepsi Hotshots to replace legendary PBA head coach Ed Ocampo. Pumaren led his team to a finals appearance in 1992 PBA Third Conference finals as 7Up Uncolas, but they were swept by Swift.

=== Sunkist Orange Juicers and success (1995–1996) ===
Pumaren was hired as head coach of the Swift Mighty Meaties/Hotdogs, which in 1995 changed its name to Sunkist Orange Juicers. He led his team to two championships (defeating Alaska Milkmen in both finals series), but lost in the last conference. He won Coach of the Year (COY) Award in the same season. However, in 1996, the success was not repeated, even assisted by legendary coach Turo Valenzona.

=== Co-coach at Mobiline (1997) ===
Pumaren was hired as co-coach for Mobiline Phone Pals with Tommy Manotoc. But their partnership did not bear any championship appearance.

=== Sta. Lucia Realtors (1998) ===
He replaced Chot Reyes as head coach of the Sta. Lucia Realtors. He led the team to a semi-finals appearance in 1998 PBA All-Filipino Cup.

=== Purefoods (1999–2000) ===
He replaced future PBA Commissioner Chito Narvasa as Purefoods head coach. He traded "Defense Minister" Jerry Codiñera to the Mobiline Phone Pals to get the 6'9 center Andy Seigle. In 2000, Pumaren led Purefoods to two finals appearances, first in the All-Filipino Cup and then in the Governors' Cup.

=== Tanduay and FedEx (2001–2003) ===
Pumaren coached the Tanduay Rhum Masters in its last season in the league. When Bert Lina acquired the team, Pumaren and some players were carried over to the FedEx Express.

In 2003, he was sacked and replaced by Bonnie Garcia.

=== Consultant for UE (2004–2008) ===
When his brother Dindo Pumaren was hired as head coach of UE Red Warriors, Pumaren was hired as team consultant. He helped the team reach the Final Four in 2004, 2005, 2006, and 2008. He also helped them get a 14-0 elimination sweep that gave them to chance to skip the Final Four and advance to the finals in 2007, but were swept by the returning De La Salle Green Archers (who had been suspended the previous year) in the finals, led by their brother Franz Pumaren.

=== Talk 'N Text (2006–2008) ===
Pumaren was hired by Talk 'N Text Phone Pals in 2005–06 season as a consultant, and later became head coach in the 2006 Philippine Cup. He led his team to the 2007 PBA Fiesta Conference finals, but lost to Alaska Aces, led by ex Phone Pals player Willie Miller. After the finals appearance, they suffered some losses which led to rumors of team management firing him and his staff. After a meeting with the players, it was decided to defer the decision until after the next tournament, the 2008 PBA Fiesta Conference. Pumaren was later replaced by Chot Reyes.

=== Hong Kong (2008–2014) ===
Pumaren served as team consultant to Hong Kong.

=== UE (2014–2017) ===
Pumaren was hired by UE Red Warriors as head coach, and led his team to a 4th seed playoff game against the eventual champions NU Bulldogs, but lost. UE struggled and did not qualify for the next seasons, which led him to resign.

=== CEU Scorpions (2018–2019) ===
Pumaren was hired by CEU Scorpions as head coach, and led his team to a better performance in the Universities and Colleges Basketball League, but once lost to Olivarez College in a semi-final game. At the 2019 PBA D-League Aspirants' Cup, he led the Scorpions to be a great performing team, but lost to Ateneo Blue Eagles three games to one.

=== Return to La Salle (2020–2022) ===
In 2020, Pumaren returned as head coach for the De La Salle Green Archers in the UAAP, replacing Gian Nazario. In December 2022, La Salle opted not to renew Pumaren's contract.

=== Discovery–Rizal/Akari Sparks (2025–) ===
Pumaren joined the Discovery Perlas Rizal of the Women's Maharlika Pilipinas Basketball League (WMPBL) 2025 regular season. This is his first time coaching a women's team. Discovery Perlas reached the finals, but New Zealand Bluefire–Batangas won the inaugural WMPBL title.

In the 2026 season, the team renamed themselves as Akari Sparks with Pumaren remaining coach. He led the team's return to the finals but Akari defeated the defending champions Bluefire in the finals and won their first ever WMPBL title.

This led to them earning a berth in the 2026 Women's Basketball League Asia in India. Pumaren guided the team to a fifth place finish.

== Coaching record ==
=== Collegiate record ===
Season	Team	Elimination round					Playoffs				
Season	Team	GP	W	L	PCT	Finish	GP	W	L	PCT	Results
1986	DLSU	14	4	10	.286	6th	–	–	–	–	Eliminated
1987	DLSU	14	6	8	.429	5th	–	–	–	–	Eliminated
1988	DLSU	14	11	3	.786	2nd	1	0	1	.000	Runner-up
1989	DLSU	14	11	3	.786	2nd	2	2	0	1.000	Champions
1990	DLSU	14	11	3	.786	1st	2	1	1	1.000	Champions
1991	DLSU	14	12	2	.857	1st	2	1	1	.500	Forfeited^{a}
2014	UE	14	9	5	.643	5th	1	0	1	.000	4th-seed playoff
2015	UE	14	6	8	.429	6th	–	–	–	–	Eliminated
2016	UE	14	3	11	.214	7th	–	–	–	–	Eliminated
2017	UE	14	3	11	.214	7th	–	–	–	–	Eliminated
2021	DLSU	14	9	5	.643	3rd	2	1	1	.500	Semifinals
2022	DLSU	14	7	7	.500	5th	1	0	1	.000	4th-seed playoff
Totals		84	37	47	.440		9	4	5	.444	2 championships

^{a}Won UAAP Championship but forfeited and the 1991 title was later awarded to FEU

=== Professional record ===
Season	Conference	Team	Elimination/classification round					Playoffs				
Season	Conference	Team	GP	W	L	PCT	Finish	GP	W	L	PCT	Results
1991	First	Pepsi	11	4	7	.364	8th	—	—	—	—	Eliminated
1991	All-Filipino	Pepsi	11	3	8	.273	8th	—	—	—	—	Eliminated
1991	Third	Pepsi	11	8	3	.727	1st	11	4	7	.363	Fourth place
1992	First	7-Up	11	4	7	.364	7th	—	—	—	—	Eliminated
1992	All-Filipino	7-Up	10	6	4	.600	4th	12	6	6	.500	Fourth place
1992	Third	7-Up	11	7	4	.636	2nd	13	6	7	.461	Runner-up
1993	All-Filipino Cup	Pepsi	10	3	7	.300	7th	—	—	—	—	Eliminated
1993	Commissioner's Cup	Pepsi	11	3	8	.273	7th	—	—	—	—	Eliminated
1993	Governors' Cup	Pepsi	10	7	3	.700	4th	11	4	7	.363	Fourth place
1994	All-Filipino Cup	Pepsi	10	3	7	.300	7th	—	—	—	—	Eliminated
1994	Commissioner's Cup	Pepsi	11	2	9	.182	8th	—	—	—	—	Eliminated
1994	Governors' Cup	Swift	10	6	4	.600	3rd	15	8	7	.533	Runner-up
1995	All-Filipino Cup	Sunkist	10	7	3	.700	1st	15	10	5	.667	Champions
1995	Commissioner's Cup	Sunkist	10	9	1	.900	1st	16	10	6	.625	Champions
1995	Governors' Cup	Sunkist	10	8	2	.800	1st	11	5	6	.454	Third place
1996	All-Filipino Cup	Sunkist	14	4	10	.400	7th	—	—	—	—	Eliminated
1996	Commissioner's Cup	Sunkist	10	5	5	.500	6th	1	0	1	.000	Semifinal playoff
1996	Governors' Cup	Sunkist	11	5	6	.455	5th	2	1	1	.500	Quarterfinals
1998	All-Filipino Cup	Sta. Lucia	11	5	6	.455	3rd	12	7	5	.583	Fourth place
1998	Commissioner's Cup	Sta. Lucia	11	4	7	.364	8th	—	—	—	—	Eliminated
1998	Centennial Cup	Sta. Lucia	8	1	7	.125	8th	—	—	—	—	Eliminated
1998	Governors' Cup	Sta. Lucia	7	5	2	.714	7th	—	—	—	—	Eliminated
1999	All-Filipino Cup	Purefoods	16	7	9	.438	7th	2	1	1	.500	Quarterfinals
1999	Commissioner's Cup	Purefoods	8	3	5	.375	7th	2	1	1	.500	Quarterfinals
1999	Governors' Cup	Purefoods	8	7	1	.875	1st	5	1	4	.200	Fourth place
2000	All-Filipino Cup	Purefoods	14	8	6	.571	4th	11	5	6	.454	Runner-up
2000	Commissioner's Cup	Purefoods	9	4	5	.444	5th	1	0	1	.000	Quarterfinals
2000	Governors' Cup	Purefoods	9	5	4	.556	4th	11	5	6	.454	Runner-up
2001	All-Filipino Cup	Tanduay	14	5	9	.357	9th	—	—	—	—	Eliminated
2001	Commissioner's Cup	Tanduay	9	3	6	.333	7th	1	0	1	.000	Quarterfinals
2001	Governors' Cup	Tanduay	13	5	8	.385	9th	—	—	—	—	Eliminated
2002	Governors' Cup	FedEx	11	6	5	.545	5th	1	0	1	.000	Quarterfinals
2002	Commissioner's Cup	FedEx	10	6	4	.600	6th	2	1	1	.500	Quarterfinals
2002	All-Filipino Cup	FedEx	9	1	8	.111	10th	—	—	—	—	Eliminated
2003	All-Filipino Cup	FedEx	18	10	8	.556	2nd (B)	3	1	2	.333	Quarterfinals
2003	Invitational	FedEx	4	3	1	.750	1st (A)	2	1	1	.500	Third place
2003	Reinforced	FedEx	13	5	8	.385	2nd (A)	2	0	2	.000	Quarterfinals
2005–06	Philippine Cup	Talk 'N Text	16	6	10	.374	8th	3	1	2	.333	Quarterfinals
2006–07	Philippine Cup	Talk 'N Text	18	10	8	.556	4th	11	6	5	.545	Third place
2006–07	Fiesta	Talk 'N Text	18	11	7	.611	4th	16	9	7	.563	Runner-up
2007–08	Philippine Cup	Talk 'N Text	18	9	9	.500	6th	1	0	1	.000	First wildcard round
2007–08	Fiesta	Talk 'N Text	18	9	9	.500	7th	2	1	1	.500	Second wildcard round
Totals			476	232	250	.487		195	94	101	.482	2 championships

=== National team record ===
Tournament	Team	GP	W	L	PCT	Finish	Results
1989 SEA Games	Philippines	4	3	1	.750	2nd	(silver) Silver medal

== The Pumaren family ==
- His father is Pilo Pumaren (former UE Red Warrior), who served as an assistant coach under Norman Black for the San Miguel Beermen. He also played for the UE Red Warriors.
- He has two younger brothers who were both PBA players whom he had coached: Franz Pumaren (former La Salle Green Archer), who played for the San Miguel Beermen and Mobiline Phone Pals. He later inherited Derrick's head coaching duties in the UAAP and the PBL. Franz won the most college basketball titles in the modern era (post-EDSA). The youngest brother is Dindo Pumaren, who won multiple championships with the Purefoods TJ Hotdogs and Pepsi, former head coach of the UE Red Warriors and DLSU Green Archers in the UAAP. Dindo is considered one of the game's greatest point guards, along with Olsen Racela and Ronnie Magsanoc.

Preceded by first	Magnolia/Lagerlite head coach 1983–1991	Succeeded by Franz Pumaren
Preceded by Joaqui Trillo (NCAA)	La Salle Green Archers head coach 1986–1991	Succeeded by Gabby Velasco
Preceded by Nat Canson (first stint)	Magnolia Cheese head coach 1986	Succeeded by Norman Black
Preceded by Ed Ocampo; Norman Black; Joel Banal	Talk 'N Text/Mobiline/Pepsi head coach 1993–1994; 1997; 2006–2008	Succeeded by Yeng Guiao; Tommy Manotoc; Chot Reyes
Preceded by Yeng Guiao	Sunkist/Swift/Pop Cola head coach 1995–1996	Succeeded by Turo Valenzona
Preceded by Chot Reyes	Sta. Lucia Realtors head coach 1998	Succeeded by Adonis Tierra
Preceded by Chito Narvasa	Purefoods TJ Hotdogs head coach 1999–2000	Succeeded by Eric Altamirano
Preceded by Alfrancis Chua	Tanduay Rhum Masters head coach 2001	Succeeded by Final
Preceded by first	FedEx Express head coach 2002–2003	Succeeded by Bonnie Garcia
Preceded by Boysie Zamar	UE Red Warriors head coach 2014–2017	Succeeded by Joe Silva
Preceded by Gian Nazario	La Salle Green Archers head coach 2020–2022	Succeeded by Topex Robinson
