= 2015 FEU Tamaraws basketball team =

American college basketball season

2015 FEU Tamaraws men's basketball

PCCL National Champions

UAAP Season 78 Men's Basketball, Champions
- Conference: UAAP
- Record: 14–4 (11–3 Elimination Round)
- Head coach: Nash Racela (3rd year)
- Assistant coach: Eric Gonzales, Josh Reyes, Gilbert Lao, and Johnny Abarrientos
- Captain: Rey Mark Belo

The 2015 FEU Tamaraws Men's Basketball team represented Far Eastern University during the University Athletic Association of the Philippines' 78th season in men's basketball division. The Tamaraws were led by their third year coach Nash Racela.

The Tamaraws won the UAAP Season 78 finals after defeating the UST Growling Tigers in 3 games, their first title since 2005 and 20th title overall. It was also the final season for 6 players, namely Mike Tolomia, Mike Belo, Roger Pogoy, Russel Escoto, Achie Inigo and Alfrancis Tamsi.

== Off season ==
=== Departures ===
Name	Number	Pos.	Height	Weight	Year	Hometown	Notes
Carl Bryan Cruz	4	PF	6'3"	185	5th	Quezon City	Graduated
Aurel Jason David	11	PG	5'8"	145	1st	Vancouver	Returned to Vancouver
Jeson Delfinado	9	SG	5'11"	155	2nd	Davao City	Relegated to Team B
Augus Denila	11	PG			1st	Iloilo City	Relegated to Team B
Anthony Hargrove	15	C	6'5"	210	3rd	Newark, New Jersey	Graduated
Joel Christian Lee Yu	20	SG	5'9"	155	2nd	Cebu City	Relegated to Team B
Reeve Ugsang	21	PF	6'4"	180	1st	Baybay, Leyte	Transferred to SWU

== Roster ==
FEU Tamaraws roster
Players
Coaches

Pos.	No.	Nat.	Name	Height	Year	High School
PG	4	(United States)	Trinidad, Jose Allen C.	5'9" (1.75m)	1st	Orange Coast
SG	5	(Philippines)	Tamsi, Francis M.	6'0" (1.83m)	4th	Bohol Institute of Technology - Jagna
F/C	6	(Philippines)	Jose, Raymar A.	6'4" (1.93m)	4th	Arellano
SG	7	(Philippines)	Dennison, Ron Marvis C.	5'9" (1.75m)	3rd	UV
PF	8	(Philippines)	Escoto, Russel	6'5" (1.96m)	4th	FEU Diliman
PF	9	(Philippines)	Ebona, Kevin Barkley C.	6'4" (1.93m)	1st	Cebu-IT
PG	10	(Philippines)	Comboy III, Wendelino T.	6'0" (1.83m)	1st	FEU Diliman
SF	11	(Norway)	Holmqvist, Steve S.	6'3" (1.91m)	1st	–
F	12	(Philippines)	Belo, Rey Mark G. (C)	6'4" (1.93m)	4th	SMA-Midsayap
SG	13	(Philippines)	Tolomia, Mike S.	5'11" (1.8m)	5th	FEU Diliman
SG	15	(Philippines)	Arong, Monbert D.	5'11" (1.8m)	1st	USP
SF	16	(Philippines)	Pogoy, Roger Ray	6'2" (1.88m)	5th	Cebu
C	17	(Nigeria)	Orizu, Prince I.	6'8" (2.03m)	2nd	Ikeja HS
PG	18	(Philippines)	Iñigo, Achie	5'9" (1.75m)	4th	Letran
C	20	(Norway)	Holmqvist, Ken S.	6'10" (2.08m)	1st	–
F	21	(Philippines)	Escoto, Richard D.	6'3" (1.91m)	2nd	FEU Diliman

Head coach

- (Philippines) Nash Racela

Assistant coach(es)

- (Philippines) Johnny Abarrientos
- (Philippines) Joshua Vincent Reyes
- (Philippines) Eric Gonzales
- (Philippines) Gilbert Lao
- (Philippines) Richard Anthony Ticzon

Team manager

- (Philippines) Mark Molina
- (Philippines) Anton Montinola

Legend

- (C) Team captain
- Injured

=== Rotation ===
Pos.	Starting 5	Bench 1	Bench 2	Bench 3
C	Prince Orizu	Raymar Jose	Ken Holmqvist
PF	Russel Escoto	Richard Escoto	Kevin Barkley Ebona
SF	Rey Mark Belo	Roger Ray Pogoy	Steve Holmqvist
SG	Ron Dennison	Monbert Arong	Francis Tamsi	Wendelino Comboy
PG	Mike Tolomia	Achie Inigo	Joe Allen Trinidad

=== Players' statistics ===
Player	GP	MPG	PPG	RPG	APG	SPG	BPG
Rey Mark Belo	12	26.17	13.33	6.17	2.42	0.58	1.08
Mike Tolomia	12	24.83	12.42	5.08	4.42	0.17	0.17
Roger Ray Pogoy	12	20.17	11.00	3.83	1.67	0.58	1.08
Raymar Jose	12	21.33	8.08	8.83	1.08	0.25	0
Russel Escoto	12	20.08	6.92	5	0.58	0.17	0.83
Achie Iñigo	12	21.08	5.58	3.25	2.33	0.5	0.33
Monbert Arong	12	15.83	5.5	3.33	0.92	0.08	0.08
Price Orizu	12	14.42	4.25	4.75	0.00	0.00	0.83
Francis Tamsi	12	11.08	4.25	0.92	0.42	0.67	0.08
Joe Allen Trinidad	12	6.42	1.33	0.75	0.92	0.08	0.00
Ron Dennison	10	9.30	1.30	1.50	0.60	0.00	0.20
Richard Escoto	12	6.75	1.25	1.25	0.17	0.08	0.17
Wendelino Comboy III	7	3.14	0.57	0.86	0.14	0.00	0.00
Ken Holmqvist	7	2.43	0.43	0.71	0.00	0.00	0.00
Kevin Barkley Ebona	-	-	-	-	-	-	-
Steve Holmqvist	-	-	-	-	-	-	-

Source: PBA-Online.net

== Schedule ==
Date time, TV	Rank^{#}	Opponent^{#}	Result	Record	High points	High rebounds	High assists	Site (attendance) city, state
UAAP Season 78 First Round
September 6*; 4:00 pm		Ateneo	W 88–64	1-0	19 – Pogoy	10 – Jose	6 – Tolomia	Mall of Asia Arena; Pasay, Philippines
September 9*; 4:00 pm		UST	L 71-72	1-1	17 – Belo	10 – Jose	5 – Tolomia	Smart Araneta Coliseum; Quezon City, Philippines
September 13*; 4:00 pm		La Salle	W 93-75	2-1	20 – Tolomia	9 – Orizu	5 – Tolomia	Mall of Asia Arena; Pasay, Philippines
September 20*; 4:00 pm		State U	W 75-58	3-1	11 – Tied	13 – Jose	4 – Tied	Smart Araneta Coliseum; Quezon City, Philippines
September 23*; 2:00 pm		UE	W 92-81	4-1	24 – Belo	11 – Jose	8 – Tolomia	Mall of Asia Arena; Pasay, Philippines
September 27*; 4:00 pm		Adamson	W 64-60	5-1	11 – Russel Escoto	10 – Belo	– -	Smart Araneta Coliseum; Quezon City, Philippines
October 7*; 4:00 pm		National	W 64-60	6-1	19 – Tolomia	– -	– -	Smart Araneta Coliseum; Quezon City, Philippines
UAAP Season 78 Second Round
October 11*; 11:00 am		Ateneo	W 66-61	7-1	12 – Belo	13 – Jose	3 – Inigo	Smart Araneta Coliseum; Quezon City, Philippines
October 14*; 4:00 pm		State U	W 68-57	8-1	17 – Pogoy	12 – Belo	3 – Tolomia	Smart Araneta Coliseum; Quezon City, Philippines
October 11*; 4:00 pm		UE	W 71-67	9-1	16 – Belo	8 – Pogoy	– -	Smart Araneta Coliseum; Quezon City, Philippines
October 28*; 4:00 pm		Adamson	W 82-69	10-1	13 – Russel Escoto	7 – Jose	– -	Smart Araneta Coliseum; Quezon City, Philippines
November 7*; 4:00 pm		UST	L 76-85	10-2	17 – Tolomia	9 – Belo	3 – Inigo	Smart Araneta Coliseum; Quezon City, Philippines
November 14*; 4:00 pm		NU	L 68-70	10-3	23 – Tolomia	12 – Orizu	5 – Inigo	Mall of Asia Arena; Pasay, Philippines
November 18*; 4:00 pm		La Salle	W 71-68	11-3	13 – Arong	16 – Orizu	2 – Tied	Smart Araneta Coliseum; Quezon City, Philippines
UAAP Season 78 Final Four
November 21*; 3:00 pm		Ateneo	W 76-74	1-0	16 – Pogoy	9 – Belo	2 – Tied	Smart Araneta Coliseum; Quezon City, Philippines
UAAP Season 78 Finals
November 25*; 4:00 pm		UST	W 75-64	1-0	15 – Pogoy	13 – Belo	3 – Tied	Mall of Asia Arena; Pasay, Philippines
November 28*; 4:00 pm		UST	L 56-62	1-1	16 – Belo	11 – Belo	6 – Tolomia	Smart Araneta Coliseum; Quezon City, Philippines
December 2*; 4:00 pm		UST	W 67-62	2-1	23 – Belo	8 – Belo and Escoto	3 – Tolomia	Mall of Asia Arena; Pasay, Philippines
*Non-conference game. ^{#}Rankings from AP Poll. (#) Tournament seedings in parentheses. All times are in Philippine Time.
