= Pumaren =

Pumaren is a surname. Notable people with the surname include:

- Derrick Pumaren, Filipino basketball coach
- Franz Pumaren (born 1963), Filipino basketball player and coach
