= UAAP Season 52 men's basketball tournament =

Basketball competition in the Philippines

1989 UAAP season
Men's Finals	G1	G2	Wins
FEU Tamaraws	83	69	0+1
De La Salle Green Archers	90	74	2
- Duration: October 15, 1989
- Arena(s): Rizal Memorial Coliseum
- Winning coach: Derrick Pumaren
- TV network(s): IBC-13

The 1989 UAAP men's basketball tournament was the 52nd year of the men's tournament of the University Athletic Association of the Philippines (UAAP)'s basketball championship. De La Salle University won their first UAAP crown at the expense of FEU Tamaraws.

== Elimination round ==
Tournament format:

- Double round robin; the two teams with the best records advance Finals:
  - The #1 seed will only need to win once to clinch the championship.
  - The #2 seed has to win twice to clinch the championship.

Pos	Team	W	L	Pts	Qualification
1	FEU Tamaraws	12	2	26	Twice-to-beat in the Finals
2	De La Salle Green Archers	11	3	25	Twice-to-win in the Finals
3	UE Red Warriors	9	5	23	
4	Ateneo Blue Eagles	8	6	22	
5	UP Fighting Maroons	8	6	22	
6	Adamson Falcons	6	8	20	
7	UST Glowing Goldies	2	12	16	
8	NU Bulldogs	0	14	14	

=== First round results ===
Date	First game	Second game	Third game	Fourth game	Venue
July 23 recap	FEU 93 UP 74	La Salle 88 UST 69	Ateneo 85 NU 72	UE 92 Adamson 91	Araneta Coliseum
July 30 recap	Ateneo 81 UST 78	Adamson 88 UP 71	FEU 97 NU 65	La Salle 81 UE 80	Rizal Coliseum
August 4 recap	FEU 102 Ateneo 92	UE 104 UST 75	Adamson 79 NU 78	La Salle 78 UP 69	Rizal Coliseum
August 13 recap	UE 107 Ateneo 90	Adamson 112 FEU 110 OT	La Salle 94 NU 65	UP 123 UST 81	Rizal Coliseum
August 17 recap	UST 84 NU 79	Ateneo 74 Adamson 71	UP 92 UE 71	La Salle 111 FEU 101	Rizal Coliseum
August 20 recap	La Salle 91 Adamson 89	UE 76 NU 74	UP 84 Ateneo 71	FEU 101 UST 90	Rizal Coliseum
August 27 recap	La Salle 77 Ateneo 69	UP 97 NU 84	FEU 97 UE 95	Adamson 115 UST 72	Rizal Coliseum

De La Salle University won their first nine games before losing to arch rival Ateneo Blue Eagles, 61-67 on September 17, playing without national team players Jun Limpot and Johnedel Cardel.

FEU Tamaraws and De La Salle Green Archers were tied at 11 wins and two losses going into the final playing date. The Tamaraws edged the Green Archers, 78-77, on free throws by Andy De Guzman as FEU is one win away from winning the crown.

== Finals ==
October 12

FEU Tamaraws	83–90 (OT)	De La Salle Green Archers

Rizal Memorial Coliseum, Manila

The Tamaraws narrowly missed winning Game one of the finals as they were dragged into overtime before yielding. Andy de Guzman of FEU knotted the count at 77-all with 19 seconds left in regulation period.

October 15

FEU Tamaraws	69–74	De La Salle Green Archers

Rizal Memorial Coliseum, Manila

The Archers trailed by six points, 47-53, when a 13-1 run gave La Salle a 60-54 advantage. The Tamaraws came within 67-71, on two free throws by rookie playmaker Johnny Abarrientos, but Green Archer Eddie Viaplana hit a three-pointer to iced the game, 74-67 for La Salle, with 35 seconds remaining.

== See also ==
- NCAA Season 65 basketball tournaments

Preceded by Season 51 (1988)	UAAP basketball seasons Season 52 (1989)	Succeeded by Season 53 (1990)
