= 1994 Tondeña 65 Rum Masters season =

- Head coach: Robert Jaworski
- General Manager: Bernabe Navarro
- Owner(s): La Tondeña Distillers, Inc.

All-Filipino Cup results
- Record: 2–8 (20%)
- Place: 8th
- Playoff finish: Eliminated

Commissioner's Cup results
- Record: 5–6 (45.5%)
- Place: 6th
- Playoff finish: Eliminated

Governors Cup results
- Record: 5–6 (45.5%)
- Place: 7th
- Playoff finish: Eliminated

Tondeña 65 Rum Masters seasons

The 1994 Tondeña 65 Rum Masters season was the 16th season of the franchise in the Philippine Basketball Association (PBA). Formerly known as Ginebra San Miguel.

== Draft picks ==
| Round | Pick | Player | College |
|---|---|---|---|
| 1 | 1 | Noli Locsin | La Salle |
| 2 | 9 | Wilmer Ong | Saint La Salle |
| 5 | 26 | Porferio Marzan | University of Baguio |

== Notable dates ==
April 5: Tondeña 65 escaped with an 89-87 victory over Shell Rimula X for their first win of the season after six straight losses and a 14-game losing streak dating back from the Governor's Cup of last year. Jayvee Gayoso topscored for the team with 32 points.

April 10: Top draftee Noli Locsin banged in a night-high 34 points, including 14 in the last quarter as he led Tondeña to a 107-98 victory over Alaska for their second win in eight games to keep their hopes alive in a bid for the last semifinals slot.

July 17: Tondeña import Mitchell Wiggins scored a season-high 78 points as the Rhum Masters defeated Sta.Lucia Realtors in Overtime, 150-148.

October 16: Tondeña whipped Sta.Lucia, 131-123, to stay alive in its hunt for the elusive semifinals berth in the Governor’s Cup. Rhum Masters import Steve Hood finished the game with a high of 67 points.

== Roster ==
1994 Tondeña 65 Rum Masters roster
Players

| Pos. | # | POB | Name | Height | Weight | DOB (YYYY–MM–DD) | From |
|---|---|---|---|---|---|---|---|
| G/F | 2 | (Philippines) | Alejo Alolor | 6 ft 1 in (1.85 m) | | | Visayas |
| C | 5 | (Philippines) | Sonny Cabatu | 6 ft 5 in (1.96 m) | | | PSBA |
| F | 6 | (Philippines) | Noli Locsin | 6 ft 3 in (1.91 m) | | | De La Salle |
| G | 7 | (Philippines) | Robert Jaworski | 6 ft 1 in (1.85 m) | | | UE |
| F | 8 | (Philippines) | Porferio Marzan | 6 ft 1 in (1.85 m) | | | Baguio |
| F | 9 | (Philippines) | Macky De Joya | 6 ft 3 in (1.91 m) | | | San Beda |
| G/F | 11 | (Philippines) | Jayvee Gayoso | 6 ft 0 in (1.83 m) | | | Ateneo |
| G | 14 | (Philippines) | Joey Loyzaga | 6 ft 1 in (1.85 m) | | | San Beda |
| F/C | 16 | (Philippines) | Benito Cheng | 6 ft 3 in (1.91 m) | | | Mapúa |
| G | 17 | (Philippines) | Emilio Chuatico | 6 ft 0 in (1.83 m) | | | Ateneo |
| C | 18 | (Philippines) | Wilmer Ong | 6 ft 4 in (1.93 m) | | | USLS |
| G | 25 | (Philippines) | Pido Jarencio | 5 ft 9 in (1.75 m) | | | UST |
| F | 33 | (Philippines) | Bobby Jose | 6 ft 3 in (1.91 m) | | | UST |

Coaches

Head coach

- (Philippines) Robert Jaworski

Assistant coach(es)

- (Philippines) Arlene Rodriguez
- (Philippines) Philip Cezar

Team manager

- (Philippines) Bernabe Navarro

Legend

- (C) Team captain
- Injured

== Transactions ==
=== Trades ===
| Off-season | To Coney Island Manny Victorino | To Tondeña 65 Benito Cheng |

=== Additions ===
| Player | Signed | Former team |
| Joey Loyzaga | Off-season | Shell |

=== Recruited imports ===
| Name | Tournament | No. | Pos. | Ht. | College | Duration |
|---|---|---|---|---|---|---|
| Darrin Mayo | Commissioner's Cup | 34 | Center | 6"5' | Alabama State | June 17–26 |
| Mitchell Wiggins | Commissioner's Cup | 23 | Guard | 6”4’ | Florida State | July 5–31 |
| Marlin Kimbrew | Governors Cup | 30 | Forward-Center | 6"3' | | September 27 (one game) |
| Steve Hood | Governors Cup | 44 | Guard | 6"3' | James Madison | September 30 to October 30 |
