= 1994 San Miguel Beermen season =

- Head coach: Norman Black
- General manager: Eddie Veneracion
- Owner: San Miguel Corporation

All Filipino Cup results
- Record: 16–8 (66.7%)
- Place: 1st
- Playoff finish: Champions

Commissioner's Cup results
- Record: 11–12 (47.8%)
- Place: 4th
- Playoff finish: Semifinals

Governor's Cup results
- Record: 4–6 (40%)
- Place: 5th
- Playoff finish: Semifinals

San Miguel Beermen seasons

The 1994 San Miguel Beermen season was the 20th season of the franchise in the Philippine Basketball Association (PBA).

== Draft picks ==
Round	Pick	Player	College
2	15	Mike Otto	FEU

== 11th championship ==
San Miguel won their first three games of the season and had the best won-loss record in the eliminations of the All-Filipino Cup, with eight wins and two losses. The Beermen made it to the finals first and went on to play the Coney Island Ice Cream Stars for the All-Filipino Cup crown, as the two teams battled for the All-Filipino supremacy for the third straight year. San Miguel regained the championship over the defending champions Coney Island, winning in six games to become the first team in the 1990s era to win two consecutive titles since the same San Miguel team won the Grandslam in 1989. An added incentive to their finals victory was the right to represent the Philippines for the Asian Games basketball gold, as well as being seeded into the semifinal round of the season-ending Governor's Cup.

== Occurrences ==
After winning over the Swift Mighty Meaties in Game One of their series for third place in the Commissioner's Cup, the San Miguel Beermen forfeited the third-place trophy and requested the PBA to allow them to carry the national team colors for the remaining games as part of their tune-up in preparation for the upcoming Hiroshima Asian Games in October. The Beermen began playing with amateur cagers Marlou Aquino, Dennis Espino, Kenneth Duremdes, Jeffrey Cariaso, Edward Joseph Feihl and Bryant Punzalan joining the Philippine team.

== Roster ==
1994 San Miguel Beermen roster
Players

Pos.	#	POB	Name	Height	Weight	DOB (YYYY–MM–DD)	From
G	5	(Philippines)	Franz Pumaren	5 ft 9 in (1.75 m)			De La Salle
G	6	(Philippines)	Ato Agustin	5 ft 11 in (1.80 m)			Lyceum
F	8	(Philippines)	Allan Caidic	6 ft 2 in (1.88 m)			UE
F	9	(Philippines)	Samboy Lim	6 ft 0 in (1.83 m)			Letran
F/C	10	(Philippines)	Alvin Teng	6 ft 4 in (1.93 m)			Arellano
G/F	11	(Philippines)	Biboy Ravanes	6 ft 0 in (1.83 m)			Cebu
F/C	12	(Philippines)	Yves Dignadice	6 ft 4 in (1.93 m)			STI WNU
G	14	(Philippines)	Hector Calma	5 ft 9 in (1.75 m)			Adamson
G	16	(Philippines)	Rudolf Belmonte	5 ft 11 in (1.80 m)			UST
C	17	(Philippines)	Kevin Ramas	6 ft 5 in (1.96 m)			Mapúa
F	18	(Philippines)	Art Dela Cruz	6 ft 2 in (1.88 m)			San Sebastian
C	19	(Philippines)	Ramon Fernandez	6 ft 4 in (1.93 m)			San Carlos
C	20	(Philippines)	Adriano Polistico	6 ft 7 in (2.01 m)			Letran
F/C	25	(Philippines)	Freddie Abuda	6 ft 3 in (1.91 m)			Cebu

Coaches

Head coach

- (United States) Norman Black

Assistant coach(es)

- (Philippines) Pilo Pumaren
- (Philippines) Jong Uichico

Legend

- (C) Team captain
- Injured

== Transactions ==
=== Trades ===
Off-season	To Coney Island Bong Ravena	To San Miguel Beermen Kevin Ramas

=== Additions ===
Player	Signed	Former team
Rudolf Belmonte	June 1994	N/A
Freddie Abuda	November 1994	Purefoods

=== Recruited imports ===
Name	Tournament	No.	Pos.	Ht.	College	Duration
Billy Thompson	Commissioner's Cup	7	Forward	6"5'	University of Louisville	June 17–21
Billy Martin	Commissioner's Cup	7	Forward	6"5'	Georgetown University	June 28 to August 5
Eric Martin	Commissioner's Cup	4	Forward-Ccnter	6"5'	University of Cincinnati	August 9–26
Kenny Travis	Governors' Cup	21	Guard-forward	6"1'	New Mexico State	October 29 to December 4

== Asian Games ==
1994 Philippines Asian Games basketball team
- 1994 Asian Games: 4th place
Uniform
Uniform

The 1994 Philippines men's national basketball team competed in the 1994 Asian Games. The team placed fourth, behind host team Japan.

Pos	No.	Player	PBA team
PF	4	Alvin Patrimonio	Purefoods Hotdogs
PG	5	Franz Pumaren	San Miguel Beermen
PG	6	Ato Agustin	San Miguel Beermen
SF/PF	7	Rey Evangelista	Purefoods Hotdogs
G/F	8	Allan Caidic	San Miguel Beermen
G/F	9	Kenneth Duremdes	Burger Machine (PBL)
PF	10	Alvin Teng	San Miguel Beermen
C	11	Dong Polistico	San Miguel Beermen
PG	12	Johnny Abarrientos	Alaska Milkmen
C	13	Marlou Aquino	Otto Shoes (PBL)
PG	14	Hector Calma	San Miguel Beermen
C	15	Jerry Codinera	Purefoods Hotdogs
