= 1999 PBA All-Star Weekend =

Rookies-Sophomores	Veterans
85	91
- Date: August 8, 1999
- Venue: Philsports Arena, Pasig, Metro Manila
- MVP: Benjie Paras (Formula Shell)
- Network: PBA on Vintage Sports

The 1999 PBA All-Star Weekend is the annual all-star weekend of the Philippine Basketball Association (PBA). The events were held from August 6–8, 1999.

== Skills Challenge winners ==
- Slam Dunk Competition: Robert Parker of Sta.Lucia
- Buzzerbeater event co-champions: Bal David of Brgy.Ginebra and Rodney Santos of Alaska
- Three-Point Shootout: Jasper Ocampo of Pop Cola (defeated Roehl Gomez of Alaska, 17-8)
- Two-Ball Competition: Johnny Abarrientos and Kenneth Duremdes of Alaska won over the San Miguel pair of Dwight Lago and Robert Duat, 38-30

== All-Star Game ==
=== Rosters ===
Veterans

- Benjie Paras
- Kenneth Duremdes
- Johnny Abarrientos
- Alvin Patrimonio
- Jerry Codiñera
- Marlou Aquino
- Bal David
- Noli Locsin
- Jun Limpot
- Dennis Espino
- Jeffrey Cariaso
- Gerald Esplana
- Coach: Tim Cone
- Originally, Vergel Meneses and Victor Pablo were selected, but were replaced by Jerry Codiñera and Gerald Esplana because of injuries.

Rookies/Sophomores

- Jason Webb
- Eric Menk
- Sonny Alvarado
- Danny Ildefonso
- Danny Seigle
- Alvarado Segova
- Andy Seigle
- Ali Peek
- Robert Parker
- Noy Castillo
- Patrick Fran
- Asi Taulava
- Coach: Alfrancis Chua

=== Game ===
VTV

August 8

Veterans 91, Rookies-Sophomores-Juniors 85

Philsports Arena, Pasig

Benjie Paras bag his second All-Star MVP honors, leading the Veterans to a 91-85 victory over the RSJ quintet. The 1999 Edition of the PBA All-Star game is said to be one of the best All-star game ever played, and it became more of a personal battle for the Veterans team of homegrown talents in proving to be better than the Fil-Americans, when the emergence of Fil-Ams dominating the league was a hot topic that year.
