= UAAP Season 53 men's basketball tournament =

Basketball competition in the Philippines

1990 UAAP Season
Men's Finals	1	2	Wins
De La Salle Green Archers	71	78	1+1
UE Red Warriors	80	74	1
- Duration: October 1990
- Arena(s): Araneta Coliseum
- Finals MVP: Dwight Lago
- Winning coach: Derrick Pumaren
- TV network(s): Vintage Television
Juniors' Finals	1	Wins
Adamson Baby Falcons		1
Ateneo Blue Eaglets		0
- Duration: October, 1990
- Arena(s): Loyola Center
- Winning coach: Charlie Dy

UAAP Season 53 is the 1990–91 athletic year of the University Athletic Association of the Philippines.

== Men's basketball ==
The UAAP men's basketball competition opens on July 28 at the Ninoy Aquino Stadium after the opening ceremonies were twice postponed.

=== Elimination round ===
Pos	Team	W	L	Pts	Qualification
1	De La Salle Green Archers (Note: La Salle forfeited three wins after Noli Locsin, who participated on those games, was found by the UAAP Board to have been ineligible to play this season.)	11	3	25	Twice-to-beat in the Finals
2	UE Red Warriors (H)	9	5	23 (Note: Second-seed playoff: UE 80–78 Ateneo)	Twice-to-win in the Finals
3	Ateneo Blue Eagles	9	5	23	
4	UST Glowing Goldies	8	6	22	
5	FEU Tamaraws	8	6	22	
6	Adamson Falcons	6	8	20	
7	UP Fighting Maroons	4	10	18	
8	NU Bulldogs	1	13	15	

Source: ABS-CBN Sports
Rules for classification: 1) tournament points; 2) if tied for #2, one-game playoff; 3) head-to-head record; 4) head-to-head point differential; 5) overall point differential
(H) Hosts
Notes:

Defending seniors champion De La Salle University swept the first round of eliminations with seven straight victories. The Green Archers, however, saw their first three victories being reversed to a loss, when the UAAP board, via a 5–1 vote, ruled that Green Archer Noli Locsin had not completed the required one-year residency in La Salle and its therefore ineligible to play this season. Locsin saw action in their games against the Bulldogs, the Falcons and Glowing Goldies. La Salle fell to four wins and three losses, the UST Glowing Goldies, who were beaten by the Green Archers, 80–90, assumed the leadership with a 7–0 win–loss card. National University, who were routed by De La Salle, 61–91, on opening day last July 28, finally broke into a win column. The Green Archers did preserved their 64–57 conquest of arch rivals Ateneo Blue Eagles.

UST Glowing Goldies raced to an 8–0 win–loss record, following their 101–89 win over NU Bulldogs at the start of the second round. The UP Maroons handed the Goldies their first loss with a 75–66 victory on September 8.

After the two-round eliminations, De La Salle took the first finals seat with an 11–3 win–loss card. The UE Warriors and Ateneo Blue Eagles dispute the second finals berth on October 4 at the Araneta Coliseum. The Eagles of Ateneo coach Chot Reyes failed to make it another classic Ateneo-La Salle encounter following the Eagles' hairline 78–80 setback to the Warriors. The UST Glowing Goldies, after eight wins in a row, lost their last six matches with Edward Joseph Feihl sitting out and missed majority of UST's game in the second round as he was sidelined with an infection.

=== Finals ===
La Salle need to only win once to retain the title, the UE Warriors, who lost to the Green Archers twice in the eliminations, 91–93 in overtime and 74–76, had to win twice in order to capture the UAAP crown.

October

De La Salle Green Archers	71–80	UE Red Warriors

Araneta Coliseum, Quezon City

October

De La Salle Green Archers	78–74	UE Red Warriors
La Salle wins series in two games

Araneta Coliseum, Quezon City

== Juniors' basketball ==
=== Elimination round ===
Pos	Team	W	L	Pts	Qualification
1	Adamson Baby Falcons	13	1	27	Twice-to-beat in the Finals
2	Ateneo Blue Eaglets	12	2	26	Twice-to-win in the Finals
3	FEU Baby Tamaraws	9	5	23	
4	UST Nuggets	8	6	22	
5	UE Pages	6	8	20	
6	DLSZ Green Bengals	5	9	19	
7	UPIS Junior Maroons	2	12	16	
8	NU Bullpups	1	13	15	

Rules for classification: 1) tournament points; 2) if tied for #2, one-game playoff; 3) head-to-head record; 4) head-to-head point differential; 5) overall point differential

Adamson Baby Falcons outclassed Ateneo Blue Eaglets, 79–67, on the final day of the eliminations on September 29 at the Loyola Center to finish with a 13-win, 1-loss record. The Baby Falcons advanced to the playoffs with a twice-to-beat advantage over the second-seeded Eaglets, needing to beat Ateneo only once to clinch their third straight title.

== Overall Championship race ==
=== Juniors' Division ===
Rank	School	Points
1st	-	-
2nd	-	-
3rd	-	-
4th	-	-
5th	-	-
6th	-	-
7th	-	-
8th	-	-

=== Seniors' Division ===
Rank	School	Points
1st	-	-
2nd	-	-
3rd	-	-
4th	-	-
5th	-	-
6th	-	-
7th	-	-
8th	-	-

== See also ==
- NCAA Season 66 basketball tournaments
