= Rey Evangelista =

Filipino basketball player (born 1971)

The Honorable Rey Evangelista

Member of the Ormoc City Council from the Lone district
- In office June 30, 2022 – June 30, 2025

Personal details
- Born: December 28, 1971 (age 54) Ormoc City, Leyte, Philippines
- Party: PDP–Laban (2021–present)
- Basketball career

Personal information
- Listed height: 6 ft 4 in (1.93 m)
- Listed weight: 190 lb (86 kg)

Career information
- College: UST
- PBA draft: 1994: 1st round, 2nd overall pick
- Drafted by: Coney Island Ice Cream Stars
- Playing career: 1994–2008
- Position: Small forward
- Number: 7

Career history

Playing
- 1994–2008: Purefoods

Coaching
- 2008–2010: B-Meg Derby Ace Llamados (assistant)

Career highlights
- As player: 4x PBA champion (1994 Commissioner's, 1997 All-Filipino, 2002 Governors', 2006 Philippine); PBA Best Player of the Conference (2002 Governors'); 5x PBA All-Star (1994–1998); PBA Mythical Second Team (2002); 3x PBA All-Defensive Team (2000–2002); 3x PBA Sportsmanship Award (1995, 1999, 2001); No. 7 retired by Purefoods; PBL champion (1993 Maharlika); PBL Most Valuable Player (1993 Maharlika); As assistant coach: PBA champion (2009–10 Philippine)

Rey Fran Evangelista (born December 28, 1971) is a Filipino retired professional basketball player who played for Purefoods franchise in the Philippine Basketball Association during his entire career. He was a one-time Best Player of the Conference awardee in 2002. He was known as a great defensive player and a left-handed shooter. He is now a politician who serving as a city councilor for Ormoc City.

== Player profile ==
Rey hails from Ormoc, Leyte. He started out as a volleyball player during his high school days at St. Peter's College. He shifted to basketball because people noticed he is a high leaper and is also good at positional plays. Rey completed a course in Agribusiness at the Visayan State College of Agriculture and played for the VSCA team that was crowned champion of the State Colleges and Universities Athletic Association Region 8 meet.

He tried out at University of Santo Tomas and made it to the Glowing Goldies lineup under coach Aric del Rosario. Rey is a masteral student at UST and a cousin of UST's big boy Raymond Fran. He saw action for Nikon Home Appliances in the Philippine Basketball League in 1993 and turn pro in the following year.

Rey was the second overall pick in the 1994 PBA draft, chosen by Purefoods TJ Hotdogs. In his first season, Rey was the only rookie included in the Philippine team that went to Hiroshima, Japan for the Asian Games. Most fans and the PBA press corps believes he should be the season's rookie of the year and Rey had a lot of sympathizers when his name was not called during the PBA annual awards night. He spent all of his 14 seasons in the PBA with the Purefoods franchise and retired from active playing in 2008.

== PBA career statistics ==
Legend
GP	Games played	MPG	Minutes per game
FG%	Field-goal percentage	3P%	3-point field-goal percentage	FT%	Free-throw percentage
RPG	Rebounds per game	APG	Assists per game	SPG	Steals per game
BPG	Blocks per game	PPG	Points per game	**Bold**	Career high

=== Season-by-season averages ===
Year	Team	GP	MPG	FG%	3P%	FT%	RPG	APG	SPG	BPG	PPG
1994	Coney Island / Purefoods	58	28.8	.487	.000	.747	5.5	1.5	.6	.6	9.6
1995	Purefoods	61	28.4	.528	.000	**.792**	4.6	1.8	.3	.5	8.0
1996	Purefoods	57	26.2	.519	**.500**	.595	5.4	1.4	.7	.4	7.2
1997	Purefoods	63	23.4	.495	.000	.650	4.5	.9	.5	.3	7.2
1998	Purefoods	59	25.2	**.552**	.167	.707	4.4	1.5	.6	.3	7.0
1999	Purefoods	41	**36.2**	.508	.333	.644	6.9	2.0	.9	**.7**	9.1
2000	Purefoods	55	31.8	.414	.250	.719	**7.5**	1.6	.8	.5	7.0
2001	Purefoods	44	35.5	.503	.000	.714	7.1	2.1	**1.1**	.4	**10.3**
2002	Purefoods	42	27.4	.386	.341	.694	4.1	**2.6**	.7	.2	7.3
2003	Purefoods	25	27.2	.279	.460	.579	5.9	1.4	1.0	.2	8.0
2004–05	Purefoods	**64**	24.2	.433	.247	.672	5.2	1.3	.7	.1	6.3
2005–06	Purefoods	27	16.7	.386	.333	.756	3.8	1.0	.6	.2	3.9
2006–07	Purefoods	41	19.6	.454	.143	.699	4.4	.8	.4	.1	5.4
2007–08	Purefoods	28	10.5	.508	.400	.545	2.6	.4	.4	.0	2.9
Career		665	26.4	.466	.313	.693	5.2	1.5	.7	.3	7.3
