= Noli Locsin =

Filipino basketball player (born 1971)

Personal information
- Born: October 19, 1971 (age 55) Bacolod, Philippines
- Listed height: 6 ft 3 in (1.91 m)
- Listed weight: 215 lb (98 kg)

Career information
- College: De La Salle
- PBA draft: 1994: 1st round1st overall
- Drafted by: Tondeña 65 Rhum Masters
- Playing career: 1994–2005
- Position: Power forward / small forward
- Number: 6

Career history
- 1994–1999: Tondeña 65 Rhum Masters / Ginebra San Miguel / Gordon's Gin Boars / Barangay Ginebra Kings
- 1999–2000: Pop Cola 800s / Sunkist Orange Juicers / Pop Cola Panthers
- 2001: Tanduay Rhum Masters
- 2002: Batang Red Bull Thunder
- 2003: Talk 'N Text Phone Pals
- 2004–2005: Sta. Lucia Realtors
- 2005: Alaska Aces

Career highlights
- 2× PBA champion (1997 Commissioner's, 2002 Commissioner's); 5× PBA All-Star (1994–1997, 1999); 2× PBA Mythical Second Team (1996, 1997); PBA All-Star Weekend Slam Dunk Contest champion (1996)

Luis Manuel Bespejo Locsin (born October 19, 1971), better known as Noli Locsin, is a Filipino retired professional basketball player. Dubbed as "The Tank", He is best known for his playing years with the Ginebra San Miguel franchise in the Philippine Basketball Association (PBA).

== Playing career ==
Locsin played for the RP Youth team in 1990 before suiting up for back-to-back UAAP titlist De La Salle Green Archers. He had a brief stint with Triple-V Foodmasters in the Philippine Basketball League prior to its disbandment and then played for Nikon Electric Fan which completed a cinderella finish in the PBL.

In the 1994 PBA draft, the Tondeña 65 Rhum Masters (now Barangay Ginebra San Miguel) used their first pick on Noli Locsin. During his subsequent rookie season, he was the team's leading scorer and the league's leading local rebounder with averages of 18.5 points, 8.8 rebounds, 2.9 assists in 34.9 minutes, despite Tondeña 65 winning just 12 of their 32 games in the 1994 season.

Playing for player-coach Robert Jaworski's "never-say-die" system, he flourished playing power forward while being undersized at only 6-3 without being able to develop outside shooting. A consistent low post threat, Locsin closed the size gap with his strength and skill although he began to fade out as soon as he parted ways with Jaworski. Before the arrival of Fil-Ams in the PBA, Locsin was considered one of the top bruisers of his time in a time when it was rare for a Filipino player with his bulk to move as quick and leap as he did. Locsin was then traded to Pop Cola in the mid-season in 1999 for Vergel Meneses. He drifted to other PBA teams such as Tanduay and Red Bull before retiring.

== PBA career statistics ==
Legend
GP	Games played	MPG	Minutes per game
FG%	Field-goal percentage	3P%	3-point field-goal percentage	FT%	Free-throw percentage
RPG	Rebounds per game	APG	Assists per game	SPG	Steals per game
BPG	Blocks per game	PPG	Points per game	**Bold**	Career high

=== Season-by-season averages ===
Year	Team	GP	MPG	FG%	3P%	FT%	RPG	APG	SPG	BPG	PPG
1994	Tondeña	32	34.9	**.532**	.222	.617	8.8	**2.9**	**.8**	**.8**	**18.5**
1995	Ginebra	29	36.3	.499	.111	**.684**	**10.6**	2.6	.4	.7	17.6
1996	Ginebra	64	32.5	.530	.222	.636	7.1	2.5	.7	.5	15.5
1997	Gordon's Gin	**66**	32.5	.504	.188	.682	7.5	2.8	.6	.3	13.1
1998	Gordon's Gin / Ginebra	31	28.1	.514	.167	.634	5.6	2.3	**.8**	.5	11.4
1999	Barangay Ginebra	39	**38.4**	.458	**.333**	.500	7.9	2.8	.4	.6	13.9
1999	Pop Cola	39	**38.4**	.458	**.333**	.500	7.9	2.8	.4	.6	13.9
2000	Pop Cola / Sunkist	34	33.2	.446	.222	.532	5.2	2.8	.3	.5	8.5
2001	Tanduay	37	26.0	.473	.000	.519	6.1	1.2	.4	.4	8.1
2002	Red Bull	32	9.6	.437	.000	.500	1.6	.7	.2	.1	2.9
2003	Talk 'N Text	26	8.2	.424	.000	.500	2.0	.6	.1	.0	3.1
2004–05	Sta. Lucia	24	10.5	.350	—	.316	2.2	.6	.2	.0	2.6
2004–05	Alaska	24	10.5	.350	—	.316	2.2	.6	.2	.0	2.6
Career		413	28.2	.493	.200	.614	6.2	2.1	.5	.4	11.3
