= Cris Bade =

Retired Filipino basketball player

Personal information
- Listed height: 6 ft 3 in (1.91 m)

Career information
- College: San Sebastian
- PBA draft: 1994: 2nd round, 14th overall pick
- Drafted by: Shell Helix
- Position: Forward

Career history
- ~1993: Otto Shoes
- 1994–1995: Shell Rimula X / Formula Shell
- 1998–1999: Davao Eagles; Socsargen Marlins; Pangasinan Waves
- 1999–2001: Laguna Lakers
Medals
Men's basketball
Philippines
SEA Games
Gold medal – first place	1993 Singapore	Team

Cris Bade is a retired Filipino basketball player who played for Shell Helix from 1994 to 1995.

== Career ==
=== College ===
Cris Bade played college basketball for the San Sebastian Stags in the National Collegiate Athletic Association (NCAA).

=== Club ===
Cris Bade played in the Philippine Basketball League (PBL) and was with Otto Shoes in 1993.

Bade was selected by Shell Helix in the 1994 draft of the Philippine Basketball Association and was the 12th overall pick. He went on to play for two seasons.

He later joined the Metropolitan Basketball Association. He first joined the Davao Eagles for the inaugural 1998 season. He also later suited for the Socsargen Marlins and the Pangasinan Waves before joining the Laguna Lakers in July 1999. He played for the Lakers until 2001.

=== National team ===
Bade played for the Philippine national team which won the gold medal in the 1993 SEA Games in Singapore. This was despite challenges in forming a squad due to a dispute between the PBL and the Basketball Association of the Philippines.

== Personal life ==
Bade raised a family in the United States after his retirement. He married with a woman named Lalanie with whom he has two daughters including Gabi who also became a basketball player.
