= 1994 Sta. Lucia Realtors season =

- Head coach: Nat Canson
- Owner: Sta. Lucia Realty and Development Corporation

All Filipino Cup results
- Record: 7–11 (38.9%)
- Place: 5th
- Playoff finish: Semifinals

Commissioner's Cup results
- Record: 3–8 (27.3%)
- Place: 7th
- Playoff finish: N/A

Governor's Cup results
- Record: 1–9 (10%)
- Place: 8th
- Playoff finish: N/A

Sta. Lucia Realtors seasons

The 1994 Sta. Lucia Realtors season was the 2nd season of the franchise in the Philippine Basketball Association (PBA).

== Draft picks ==
Round	Pick	Player	College
1	7	Expedito Falcasantos	University of Cebu
3	19	Vidal Librada	USJ-R
4	24	Ramon Singson	UST

== Notable dates ==
March 6: The Sta.Lucia Realtors pulled off a 111-108 victory over Tondeña 65 in the opening game of the league's 20th season.

March 22: The Realtors scored their fourth win against San Miguel and handed the beermen their first loss in four games in a 103-93 victory as Jun Limpot scored 35 points.

March 26: In the out-of-town game in Sta.Cruz, Laguna, the Realtors scored their fifth victory in six starts as they repeated over Tondeña 65 Rhum Masters, 110-105.

July 10: Sta.Lucia toppled an importless Swift Mighty Meaties, 109-98, to claim their first victory in six games. The defending champions Swift, unbeaten before the game with six straight wins, played without import Ronnie Thompkins, who is serving the second of his two-game suspension.

== Roster ==
1994 Sta. Lucia Realtors roster
Players

Pos.	#	POB	Name	Height	Weight	DOB (YYYY–MM–DD)	From
F	5	(Philippines)	Expedito Falcasantos	6 ft 4 in (1.93 m)			Cebu
F/C	9	(Philippines)	Vidal Librada	6 ft 2 in (1.88 m)			USJ–R
G/F	11	(Philippines)	Peter Jao	5 ft 11 in (1.80 m)			USJ–R
F	12	(Philippines)	Romeo Dela Rosa	6 ft 2 in (1.88 m)			Southwestern-U
G	14	(Philippines)	Gerry Esplana	6 ft 0 in (1.83 m)			Far Eastern
F	18	(Philippines)	Roberto Jabar	6 ft 0 in (1.83 m)			Southwestern-U
G	19	(Philippines)	Boyet Fernandez	5 ft 9 in (1.75 m)			San Agustin
G/F	21	(Philippines)	Victor Villarias	6 ft 1 in (1.85 m)			UE
G	27	(Philippines)	Melchor Teves	6 ft 2 in (1.88 m)			San Sebastian
C	41	(Philippines)	Jack Tanuan	6 ft 5 in (1.96 m)			Far Eastern
G	44	(Philippines)	Ramon Singson	6 ft 0 in (1.83 m)			UST
F	50	(Philippines)	Maximo Delantes	6 ft 2 in (1.88 m)			Visayas
F	62	(Philippines)	Alejandro De Guzman	6 ft 2 in (1.88 m)			Far Eastern
C	72	(Philippines)	Jun Limpot	6 ft 5 in (1.96 m)			De La Salle

Coaches

Head coach

- (Philippines) Nat Canson

Assistant coach(es)

- (Philippines) Joshua Villapando
- (Philippines) Adonis Tierra

Team manager

- (Philippines) Buddy Encarnado

Legend

- (C) Team captain
- Injured

== Transactions ==
=== Trades ===
Off-season	To Shell Paul Alvarez	To Sta. Lucia Romeo Dela Rosa

=== Additions ===
Player	Signed	Former team
Victor Villarias	Off-season	N/A
Roberto Jabar	Off-season	Pepsi Mega

=== Recruited imports ===
Name	Tournament	No.	Pos.	Ht.	College	Duration
Chris Ward	Commissioner's Cup	00	Forward	6"5'	Texas Christian	June 19 (one game)
Louis Ely	Commissioner's Cup	33	Center-Forward	6"5'	University of Wisconsin	June 24-28
Lambert Shell	Commissioner's Cup; Governors Cup	42	Guard-Forward	6"2'	University of Bridgeport	July 3-August 2 September 27-October 25
