= 1994 Purefoods Tender Juicy Hotdogs season =

- Head coach: Chot Reyes
- General manager: Teddy Dimayuga
- Owner: Purefoods Corporation

All Filipino Cup results
- Record: 15–10 (60%)
- Place: 2nd
- Playoff finish: Runner-up

Commissioner's Cup results
- Record: 17–7 (70.8%)
- Place: 1st
- Playoff finish: Champions

Governors Cup results
- Record: 5–9 (35.7%)
- Place: 4th
- Playoff finish: Semifinals

Purefoods Tender Juicy Hotdogs seasons

The 1994 Purefoods Tender Juicy Hotdogs season, known as Coney Island Ice Cream Stars in the All-Filipino Cup, was the 7th season of the franchise in the Philippine Basketball Association (PBA).

== Draft picks ==
Round	Pick	Player	College
1	2	Rey Evangelista	UST
1	8	Vince Hizon	Ateneo de Manila
2	14	Peter Naron	University of Visayas

== Notable dates ==
March 8: The defending All-Filipino champions opened their season by hanging tough in the final 5.1 seconds to pull off a 111-109 victory over Swift. Alvin Patrimonio's lone free throw and Jerry Codiñera's block on Nelson Asaytono as the buzzer sounded save the Ice Cream Stars from a reversal after the Mighty Meaties threatened at 109-110 on rookie Boybits Victoria's three-pointer.

April 10: Coney Island subdued San Miguel Beermen, 97-95, for their sixth win in nine games in the All-Filipino Cup. The victory moved them up close to the leading Beermen, who fell to six wins and two losses which is the same slate of surprise team Sta.Lucia Realtors.

== 7th straight All-Filipino finals stint ==
Coney Island advances to the All-Filipino Cup finals for the seventh straight year after defeating Swift in a playoff game. They battled the San Miguel Beermen for the third consecutive time for All-Filipino supremacy. The Stars lost to the Beermen in six games.

== 4th championship ==
Returning to Purefoods Tender Juicy Hotdogs in the Commissioner's Cup, the Hotdogs were reinforced by former Pepsi import Kenny Redfield. Purefoods makes it to the finals against Alaska Milkmen where the Hotdogs scored a 4-1 series victory to win their fourth PBA crown.

== Awards ==
- Alvin Patrimonio wins his third Most Valuable Player (MVP) Award, becoming the first player to win back-to-back MVPs since William "Bogs" Adornado of Crispa did it in the first two years of the PBA in 1975-1976.
- Jerry Codinera and Alvin Patrimonio were named in the Mythical Team first five selection.
- Kenny Redfield was voted the Commissioner's Cup Best Import.

== Roster ==
1994 Purefoods Tender Juicy Hotdogs roster
Players

Pos.	#	POB	Name	Height	Weight	DOB (YYYY–MM–DD)	From
G/F	1	(Philippines)	Bong Ravena	6 ft 2 in (1.88 m)			UE
F/C	6	(Philippines)	Abe King	6 ft 3 in (1.91 m)			San Beda
F	7	(Philippines)	Rey Evangelista	6 ft 3 in (1.91 m)			UST
F	9	(Philippines)	Peter Naron	6 ft 3 in (1.91 m)			Visayas
G	11	(Philippines)	Richie Ticzon	5 ft 8 in (1.73 m)			Ateneo
G/F	12	(Philippines)	Glenn Capacio	6 ft 1 in (1.85 m)			Far Eastern
F	16	(Philippines)	Alvin Patrimonio	6 ft 3 in (1.91 m)			Mapúa
G	17	(Philippines)	Olsen Racela	5 ft 11 in (1.80 m)			Ateneo
G	22	(Philippines)	Frankie Lim	6 ft 0 in (1.83 m)			San Beda
G/F	25	(Philippines)	Vince Hizon	6 ft 2 in (1.88 m)			Ateneo
C	33	(Philippines)	Manny Victorino	6 ft 5 in (1.96 m)			José Rizal
C	44	(Philippines)	Jerry Codinera	6 ft 5 in (1.96 m)			UE

Coaches

Head coach

- (Philippines) Chot Reyes

Assistant coach(es)

- (Philippines) Chito Narvasa

Legend

- (C) Team captain
- Injured

== Transactions ==
=== Trades ===
Off-season	To San Miguel Beermen Kevin Ramas	To Coney Island Bong Ravena
Off-season	To Tondeña 65 Benito Cheng	To Coney Island Manny Victorino
Off-season	To Pepsi Dindo Pumaren	To Coney Island Richie Ticzon ^{4th overall pick from Pepsi}

=== Subtractions ===
Player	Signed	New team
#8 Freddie Abuda	November 1994	San Miguel Beermen

=== Recruited imports ===
Name	Tournament	No.	Pos.	Ht.	College	Duration
Kenny Redfield	Commissioner's Cup	3	Forward	6”5’	Michigan State University	June 19 to September 9
Byron Irvin	Governors Cup	21	Guard	6”5’	University of Missouri	November 5–8
Leon Wood	Governors Cup	32	Guard	6”3’	Cal State-Fullerton	November 13 to December 16

== Win–loss record ==
Season Rank	GP	Win	Lost	Pct.
2nd Overall	63	37	26	0.587
