= 1994 Shell Rimula X season =

- Head coach: Rino Salazar; Joe Lipa
- General manager: Vergel de Dios
- Owner: Pilipinas Shell

All Filipino Cup results
- Record: 3–7 (30%)
- Place: 6th
- Playoff finish: Eliminated

Commissioner's Cup results
- Record: 8–11 (42.1%)
- Place: 5th
- Playoff finish: Semifinals

Governor's Cup results
- Record: 9–12 (42.9%)
- Place: 6th
- Playoff finish: Semifinals

Shell Rimula X seasons

The 1994 Shell Rimula X season was the 10th season of the franchise in the Philippine Basketball Association (PBA).

== Draft picks ==
Round	Pick	Player	College
2	10	Enrico Gascon	FEU
2	12	Crizaldo Bade	San Sebastian
3	18	Eric Quiday	UPHSD

== Occurrences ==
After a dismal performance by the team in the All-Filipino, coach Rino Salazar was replaced by former Shell mentor Joe Lipa beginning the Commissioner’s Cup.

On July 31, Seven-time best import Bobby Parks was accused of deliberately throwing games after Shell lost to San Miguel in overtime by one point in their last outing in the eliminations of the Commissioners Cup. Shell’s loss to the Beermen eliminated Toñdena 65, who were hoping to gain a tie with San Miguel and a playoff for the last semifinals berth. Bobby Parks didn’t finish the whole conference for the first time in his eight PBA seasons. He was replaced by Jerome Lane starting the Commissioners Cup semifinal round.

In the Governor's Cup, Shell’s original choice Guy Taylor was unimpressive in their exhibition match against Pepsi Mega in Subic and was sent home in favor of Carl Ray Harris.

== Roster ==
1994 Shell Rimula X roster
Players

Pos.	#	POB	Name	Height	Weight	DOB (YYYY–MM–DD)	From
G	5	(Philippines)	Ronnie Magsanoc	5 ft 9 in (1.75 m)			UP Diliman
F	6	(Philippines)	Joey Guanio	6 ft 0 in (1.83 m)			UP Diliman
G	8	(Philippines)	Onchie Dela Cruz	5 ft 11 in (1.80 m)			Philippine Christian
G/F	9	(Philippines)	Enrico Gascon	6 ft 2 in (1.88 m)			Far Eastern
F	10	(Philippines)	Jojo Martin	6 ft 3 in (1.91 m)			NCBA
PG	11	(Philippines)	Eric Altamirano	5 ft 11 in (1.80 m)			UP Diliman
C	14	(Philippines)	Benjie Paras	6 ft 5 in (1.96 m)			UP Diliman
F	16	(Philippines)	Allan Delos Reyes	6 ft 2 in (1.88 m)			San Sebastian
F	17	(Philippines)	Terry Saldaña	6 ft 3 in (1.91 m)			Letran
F	19	(Philippines)	Cris Bade	6 ft 2 in (1.88 m)			San Sebastian
F	21	(Philippines)	Paul Alvarez	6 ft 0 in (1.83 m)			San Sebastian
F	22	(Philippines)	Mulong Orillosa	6 ft 2 in (1.88 m)			Adamson
G	23	(Philippines)	Ric-Ric Marata	5 ft 8 in (1.73 m)			Southwestern-U
F/C	32	(Philippines)	Jolly Escobar	6 ft 5 in (1.96 m)			UE
C	41	(Philippines)	Abet Guidaben	6 ft 5 in (1.96 m)			USJ–R

Coaches

Head coach

- (Philippines) Rino Salazar (All-Filipino Cup)
- (Philippines) Joe Lipa

Assistant coach(es)

- (Philippines) Cris Calilan (All-Filipino Cup)
- (Philippines) Nemie Villegas

Team manager

- (Philippines) Vergel de Dios

Legend

- (C) Team captain
- Injured

== Transactions ==
=== Trades ===
Off-season	To Sta. Lucia Realtors Romeo Dela Rosa	To Shell Paul Alvarez

=== Additions ===
Player	Signed	Former team
Terry Saldaña	Off-season	Swift
Ric-Ric Marata	Off-season	Sta.Lucia
Joey Guanio	Off-season	Purefoods

=== Recruited imports ===
Name	Tournament	No.	Pos.	Ht.	College	Duration
Bobby Parks	Commissioner's Cup	22	Forward	6"3'	Memphis State	June 17 to July 31
Jerome Lane	Commissioner's Cup	35	Forward	6"4'	University of Pittsburgh	August 7-26
Carl Harris	Governors Cup	12	Guard	6"2'	Fresno State	September 27 to October 16
Mike Morrison	Governors Cup	2	Guard-Forward	6"2'	Loyola College, Maryland	October 23 to November 6
Dell Demps	Governors Cup	23	Guard-Forward	6"2'	University of the Pacific	November 8-11
Terrence Lewis	Governors Cup	22	Guard	6"2'	Washington State	November 18 to December 2
