= 1994 Pepsi Mega Bottlers season =

- Head coach: Derrick Pumaren; Yeng Guiao
- General manager: Steve Watson; Orly Castelo (Governors Cup)
- Owner: Pepsi Philippines

All Filipino Cup results
- Record: 3–7 (30%)
- Place: 7th
- Playoff finish: N/A

Commissioner's Cup results
- Record: 2–9 (18.2%)
- Place: 8th
- Playoff finish: N/A

Governors Cup results
- Record: 15–9 (62.5%)
- Place: 3rd
- Playoff finish: Semifinals

Pepsi Mega Bottlers seasons

The 1994 Pepsi Mega Bottlers season was the 5th season of the franchise in the Philippine Basketball Association (PBA).

== Draft picks ==
Round	Pick	Player	College
1	4	Richie Ticzon	Ateneo de Manila

== Occurrences ==
Former Swift coach Yeng Guiao becomes Pepsi Mega's third head coach starting the Governors Cup, Guiao replaces Derrick Pumaren, who went over to the RFM franchise as both teams swapped coaches.

== Notable dates ==
September 27: Gido Babilonia sink a bankshot with 3.7 seconds left to lift Pepsi Mega to a 117–116 win over Sta.Lucia as the Bottlers finally win its first game in the conference after four long years at the start of the Governors Cup. The last time Pepsi won a first game was in the first conference of their maiden season in 1990 against then-fellow expansion team Pop Cola.

October 18: Pepsi Mega trounced Sta.Lucia, 104–96, for its sixth win in eight starts and the victory formalized their entry into the semifinals.

October 29: Elmer Cabahug drilled in a running three-pointer as time ran out to lift Pepsi Mega to a stunning 110–109 victory over defending champion San Miguel Beermen that reeled off the semifinal round of the PBA Governors Cup in Iloilo City.

== Award ==
Ronnie Coleman was voted the Governor's Cup Best Import, leading the Mega Bottlers to a third-place finish in the season-ending conference.

== Roster ==
1994 Pepsi Mega Bottlers roster
Players

Pos.	#	POB	Name	Height	Weight	DOB (YYYY–MM–DD)	From
F	2	(Philippines)	Dwight Lago	6 ft 2 in (1.88 m)			De La Salle
G/F	3	(Philippines)	Romeo Lopez	6 ft 0 in (1.83 m)			Angeles
G/F	4	(Philippines)	Boy Cabahug	5 ft 11 in (1.80 m)			Visayas
G	7	(Philippines)	Eugene Quilban	5 ft 7 in (1.70 m)			San Sebastian
G/F	9	(Philippines)	Naning Valenciano	6 ft 2 in (1.88 m)			USLS
G	10	(Philippines)	Dindo Pumaren	5 ft 9 in (1.75 m)			De La Salle
F	14	(Philippines)	Larry Villanil	6 ft 1 in (1.85 m)			USPF
F/C	15	(Philippines)	Joey Santamaria	6 ft 3 in (1.91 m)			De La Salle
C	18	(Philippines)	Rey Cuenco	6 ft 5 in (1.96 m)			De La Salle Araneta
C	25	(Philippines)	Gido Babilonia	6 ft 6 in (1.98 m)			UST
F/C	33	(Philippines)	Victor Pablo	6 ft 3 in (1.91 m)			Far Eastern
F/C	84 & 88	(Philippines)	Cadel Mosqueda	6 ft 3 in (1.91 m)			Arellano

Coaches

Head coach

- (Philippines) Yeng Guiao

Assistant coach(es)

- (Philippines) Roehl Nadurata
- (Philippines) Bong Go

Legend

- (C) Team captain
- Injured

== Transactions ==
=== Trades ===
Off-season	To Coney Island Richie Ticzon ^{Pepsi's draft pick}	To Pepsi Dindo Pumaren

=== Additions ===
Player	Signed	Former team
Boy Cabahug	Off-season	Purefoods
Dwight Lago	Off-season	Purefoods
Rey Cuenco	Off-season	Shell
Cadel Mosqueda	Off-season	Swift

=== Recruited imports ===
Name	Tournament	No.	Pos.	Ht.	College	Duration
Kevin Holland	Commissioner's Cup	5	Forward-Center	6"5'	DePaul University	June 17 to July 31
Ronnie Coleman	Governors Cup	24	Center	6"4'	University of Southern California	September 27 to December 16
