= 1994 PBA season =

20th PBA season

- Duration: March 6 – December 18, 1994
- Teams: 8
- TV partner: Vintage Sports (PTV)

1994 PBA Draft
- Top draft pick: Noli Locsin
- Picked by: Tondeña 65 Rhum Masters
- Season MVP: Alvin Patrimonio (Purefoods TJ Hotdogs)
- All-Filipino Cup champions: San Miguel Beermen
- All-Filipino Cup runners-up: Coney Island Ice Cream Stars
- Commissioner's Cup champions: Purefoods TJ Hotdogs
- Commissioner's Cup runners-up: Alaska Milkmen
- Governors Cup champions: Alaska Milkmen
- Governors Cup runners-up: Swift Mighty Meaties

Seasons
- ← 1993 1995 →

The 1994 PBA season was the 20th season of the Philippine Basketball Association (PBA).

== Season highlights ==
- PBA Commissioner Rey Marquez steps down and Deputy Commissioner Jun Bernardino succeeded Marquez as the new PBA Commissioner.
- The PBA has decided to send the All-Filipino Cup champions to the Hiroshima Asian Games in their continuing support to help the country in its quest to win the Asian basketball gold.
- The San Miguel Beermen earned the right to represent team Philippines by winning the All-Filipino championship over Coney Island. Amateur standouts Marlou Aquino, Kenneth Duremdes, Dennis Espino, Edward Feihl and Jeffrey Cariaso join the RP-San Miguel team.
- With injuries still hounding the San Miguel-RP Team in their preparation, Purefoods' stalwarts Alvin Patrimonio and Jerry Codiñera, who led the hotdogs to the Commissioner's Cup title, volunteered to play for the Philippine flag, the PBA change its original format in the Governor's Cup, as Purefoods Tender Juicy Hotdogs were seeded, along with San Miguel in the semifinal round, the league gave national coach Norman Black a free hand to pick one more player from Purefoods and he chooses rookie Rey Evangelista, the Alaska Milkmen also release Johnny Abarrientos to the national team with no conditions, three of the five amateur cagers practicing with the team, Dennis Espino, Edward Feihl and Jeffrey Cariaso were dropped from the roster.
- The Philippine Team salvaged fourth place, losing their final game against Japan for the bronze medal.
- Purefoods forward Alvin Patrimonio became the first back-to-back winner of the Most Valuable Player (MVP) award since William Adornado won it during the league's first two seasons. Patrimonio won his third MVP trophy, tying Bogs Adornado' three MVP awards.

== Opening ceremonies ==
The muses for the participating teams are as follows:

Team	Muse
Alaska Milkmen	
Coney Island Ice Cream Stars	Mikee Cojuangco
Pepsi Mega Bottlers	
San Miguel Beermen	
Shell Rimula X Turbo Chargers	
Sta. Lucia Realtors	
Swift Mighty Meaty Hotdogs	
Tondeña 65 Rhum Masters	Anjanette Abayari

== Champions ==
- All-Filipino Cup: San Miguel Beermen
- Commissioner's Cup: Purefoods TJ Hotdogs
- Governors Cup: Alaska Milkmen
- Team with best win–loss percentage: Alaska Milkmen (45–28, .616)
- Best Team of the Year: Purefoods TJ Hotdogs (2nd)

== All-Filipino Cup ==
=== Elimination round ===
Pos	Team	W	L	PCT	GB	Qualification
1	San Miguel Beermen	8	2	.800	—	Semifinal round
2	Coney Island Ice Cream Stars	7	3	.700	1	Semifinal round
3	Alaska Milkmen	6	4	.600	2	Semifinal round
4	Sta. Lucia Realtors	6	4	.600	2	Semifinal round
5	Swift Mighty Meaties	5	5	.500	3	Semifinal round
6	Shell Rimula X Turbo Chargers	3	7	.300	5	
7	Pepsi Mega Bottlers	3	7	.300	5	
8	Tondeña 65 Rhum Masters	2	8	.200	6	

=== Semifinal round ===
- Cumulative standings

Overall standings
Pos	Team	W	L	PCT	GB	Qualification
1	San Miguel Beermen	12	6	.667 (Note: Head-to-head record: San Miguel 2–2 Coney Island; San Miguel +19, Coney Island −19)	—	Advance to the finals (Note: If a team outside the top two teams wins at least five semifinal round games, then it and the second-placed team will playoff for the last finals berth; otherwise, the top 2 teams qualify outright.)
2	Coney Island Ice Cream Stars	12	6	.667	—	Guaranteed finals berth playoff
3	Swift Mighty Meaties	11	7	.611	1	Qualify to finals berth playoff
4	Alaska Milkmen	10	8	.556	2	Proceed to third-place playoffs
5	Sta. Lucia Realtors	7	11	.389	5	

Notes:

Semifinal round standings
Pos	Team	W	L	Qualification
1	Swift Mighty Meaties	6	2	Qualify to finals berth playoff (Note: Coney Island qualified to the finals berth playoff as #2 seeded team; finals berth playoff: Coney Island 86–74 Swift)
2	Coney Island Ice Cream Stars	5	3	
3	San Miguel Beermen	4	4	
4	Alaska Milkmen	4	4	
5	Sta. Lucia Realtors	1	7	

=== Third place playoffs ===
Team 1	Series	Team 2	Game 1	Game 2	Game 3	Game 4	Game 5
(3) Swift Mighty Meaties	2–3	(4) Alaska Milkmen	93–97	105–102	115–118 (OT)	87–84	76–90

=== Finals ===
Team 1	Series	Team 2	Game 1	Game 2	Game 3	Game 4	Game 5	Game 6	Game 7
(1) San Miguel Beermen	4–2	(2) Coney Island Ice Cream Stars	95–99	108–95	87–77	93–84	86–97	85–74	—

- Best Player of the Conference: Jerry Codiñera (Coney Island)

== Commissioner's Cup ==
=== Elimination round ===
Pos	Team	W	L	PCT	GB	Qualification
1	Alaska Milkmen	9	2	.818	—	Semifinal round
2	Purefoods Tender Juicy Hotdogs	7	4	.636	2	Semifinal round
3	San Miguel Beermen	6	5	.545	3	Semifinal round
4	Swift Mighty Meaties	6	5	.545	3	Semifinal round
5	Shell Rimula X Turbo Chargers	6	5	.545	3	Semifinal round
6	Tondeña 65 Rhum Masters	5	6	.455	4	
7	Sta. Lucia Realtors	3	8	.273	6	
8	Pepsi Mega Bottlers	2	9	.182	7	

=== Semifinal round ===
Overall standings
Pos	Team	W	L	PCT	GB	Qualification
1	Alaska Milkmen	14	5	.737	—	Advance to the finals
2	Purefoods Tender Juicy Hotdogs	13	6	.684	1	Advance to the finals
3	Swift Mighty Meaties	10	9	.526	4	Proceed to third-place playoffs
4	San Miguel Beermen	9	10	.474	5	Proceed to third-place playoffs
5	Shell Rimula X Turbo Chargers	8	11	.421	6	

Semifinal round standings
Pos	Team	W	L
1	Purefoods Tender Juicy Hotdogs	6	2
2	Alaska Milkmen	5	3
3	Swift Mighty Meaties	4	4
4	San Miguel Beermen	3	5
5	Shell Rimula X Turbo Chargers	2	6

=== Third place playoffs ===
- San Miguel Beermen forfeited third place in favor of the Swift Mighty Meaties.

=== Finals ===
Team 1	Series	Team 2	Game 1	Game 2	Game 3	Game 4	Game 5	Game 6	Game 7
(1) Alaska Milkmen	1–4	(2) Purefoods Tender Juicy Hotdogs	92–97	79–84	89–92	91–90	79–94	—	—

- Best Player of the Conference: Alvin Patrimonio (Purefoods)
- Best Import of the Conference: Ken Redfield (Purefoods)

== Governors' Cup ==
=== Elimination round ===
Pos	Team	W	L	PCT	GB	Qualification
1	Pepsi Mega Bottlers	7	3	.700	—	Semifinal round
2	Alaska Milkmen	6	4	.600	1	Semifinal round
3	Swift Mighty Meaties	6	4	.600	1	Semifinal round
4	Shell Rimula X Turbo Chargers	5	5	.500 (Note: Semifinal berth playoff: Shell 125–123 Tondeña 65 (OT))	2	Semifinal round
5	Tondeña 65 Rhum Masters	5	5	.500	2	
6	Sta. Lucia Realtors	1	5	.167	4	

Source: Manila Standard

=== Semifinal round ===
Pos	Team	W	L	PCT	GB	Qualification
1	Alaska Milkmen	7	3	.700	—	Advance to the Finals
2	Swift Mighty Meaties	7	3	.700	—	Advance to the Finals
3	Pepsi Mega Bottlers	5	5	.500	2	Proceed to third-place playoffs
4	Purefoods Tender Juicy Hotdogs	4	6	.400	3	Proceed to third-place playoffs
5	San Miguel Beermen	4	6	.400	3	
6	Shell Rimula X Turbo Chargers	3	7	.300	4	

=== Third place playoffs ===
Team 1	Series	Team 2	Game 1	Game 2	Game 3	Game 4	Game 5
(3) Pepsi Mega Bottlers	3–1	(4) Purefoods Tender Juicy Hotdogs	91–102	105–102	119–105	110–105	—

=== Finals ===
Team 1	Series	Team 2	Game 1	Game 2	Game 3	Game 4	Game 5	Game 6	Game 7
(1) Alaska Milkmen	4–1	(2) Swift Mighty Meaties	85–89	119–111	92–87	90–85	108–123	114–92	—

- Best Player of the Conference: Vergel Meneses (Sunkist)
- Best Import of the Conference: Ronnie Coleman (Pepsi)

== Awards ==
- Most Valuable Player: Alvin Patrimonio (Purefoods)
- Rookie of the Year: Boybits Victoria (Swift)
- Sportsmanship Award: Jerry Codiñera (Purefoods)
- Most Improved Player: Bong Hawkins (Alaska)
- Defensive Player of the Year: Jerry Codiñera (Purefoods)
- Mythical Five:
  - Johnny Abarrientos (Alaska)
  - Ato Agustin (San Miguel)
  - Jerry Codiñera (Purefoods)
  - Alvin Patrimonio (Purefoods)
  - Vergel Meneses (Swift)
- Mythical Second Team:
  - Boybits Victoria (Sunkist)
  - Allan Caidic (San Miguel)
  - Benjie Paras (Shell)
  - Bong Hawkins (Alaska)
  - Nelson Asaytono (Swift)
- All Defensive Team:
  - Jerry Codiñera (Purefoods)
  - Glenn Capacio (Purefoods)
  - Johnny Abarrientos (Alaska)
  - Alvin Teng (San Miguel)
  - Bong Hawkins (Alaska)

=== Awards given by the PBA Press Corps ===
- Coach of the Year: Tim Cone (Alaska)
- Mr. Quality Minutes: Merwin Castelo (Alaska)
- Executive of the Year: Elmer Yanga (Swift)
- Special Award (Outstanding Freshman Season): Rey Evangelista
- Referee of the Year: Ernesto de Leon

== Board of Governors ==
- Jun Bernardino (Commissioner)
- Ruben Cleofe (Secretary)
- Wilfred Steven Uytengsu (chairman, General Milling Corp.)
- Jose Concepcion III (Vice-chairman, Republic Flour Mills Corp.)
- Nazario Avendaño (Treasurer, San Miguel Corp.)
- Renato Buhain (Purefoods Corp.)
- Edgardo Viron Cruz (Pilipinas Shell Petroleum Corp.)
- Vicente Santos (Sta. Lucia Realty and Development, Inc)
- Moro Lorenzo (Pepsi Cola Products Philippines, Inc)
- Bernabe Navarro (La Tondeña Distillers, Inc)

== Cumulative standings ==
Pos	Team	Pld	W	L	PCT	Best finish
1	Alaska Milkmen	72	45	27	.625	Champions
2	Coney Island Ice Cream Stars / Purefoods TJ Hotdogs	63	37	26	.587	Champions
3	San Miguel Beermen	54	30	24	.556	Champions
4	Swift Mighty Meaties	69	37	32	.536	Finalist
5	Pepsi Mega Bottlers	45	20	25	.444	Third place
6	Shell Rimula X	50	20	30	.400	Semifinalist
7	Tondeña 65 Rhum Masters	32	12	20	.375	Elimination round
8	Sta. Lucia Realtors	39	11	28	.282	Semifinalist

=== Elimination round ===
Pos	Team	Pld	W	L	PCT
1	Alaska Milkmen	31	21	10	.677
2	Coney Island Ice Cream Stars / Purefoods TJ Hotdogs	21	14	7	.667
3	San Miguel Beermen	21	14	7	.667
4	Swift Mighty Meaties	31	17	14	.548
5	Shell Rimula X	31	14	17	.452
6	Pepsi Mega Bottlers	31	12	19	.387
7	Tondeña 65 Rhum Masters	31	12	19	.387
8	Sta. Lucia Realtors	31	10	21	.323

=== Playoffs ===
Pos	Team	Pld	W	L
1	Alaska Milkmen	41	24	17
2	Coney Island Ice Cream Stars / Purefoods TJ Hotdogs	42	23	19
3	Swift Mighty Meaties	38	20	18
4	San Miguel Beermen	33	16	17
5	Pepsi Mega Bottlers	14	8	6
6	Shell Rimula X	19	6	13
7	Sta. Lucia Realtors	8	1	7
8	Tondeña 65 Rhum Masters	1	0	1
