= Johnny Abarrientos =

Filipino basketball player and coach

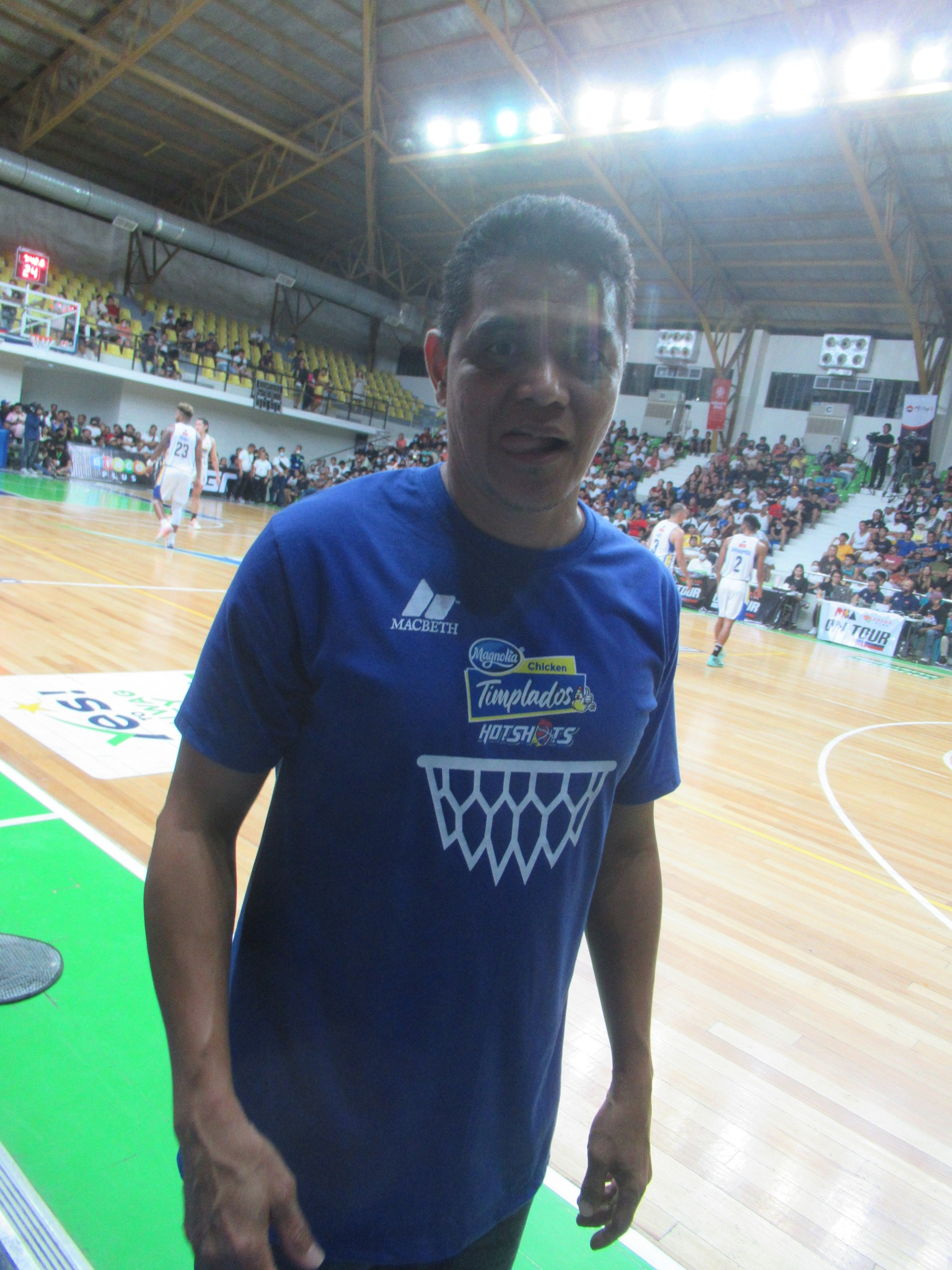
- Abarrientos in 2023

Barangay Ginebra San Miguel
- Title: Assistant coach
- League: PBA

Personal information
- Born: July 17, 1970 (age 56) Naga, Camarines Sur, Philippines
- Listed height: 5 ft 8 in (1.73 m)
- Listed weight: 161 lb (73 kg)

Career information
- High school: NCBA; FEU Diliman (Quezon City)
- College: FEU
- PBA draft: 1993: 1st round, 3rd overall pick
- Drafted by: Alaska Milkmen
- Playing career: 1993–2010
- Position: Point guard
- Coaching career: 2007–present

Career history

Playing
- 1993–2001: Alaska Aces
- 2001: Pop Cola Panthers
- 2002–2006: Coca-Cola Tigers
- 2006–2010: Barangay Ginebra Kings

Coaching
- 2007–2011: Barangay Ginebra Kings (assistant)
- 2011–present: Far Eastern University (assistant)
- 2011–2025: Magnolia Chicken Timplados Hotshots (assistant)
- 2025–present: Barangay Ginebra San Miguel (assistant)

Career highlights
- As player: 12x PBA champion (1994 Governors', 1995 Governors', 1996 All-Filipino, 1996 Commissioner's, 1996 Governors', 1997 Governors', 1998 All-Filipino, 1998 Commissioner's, 2000 All-Filipino, 2002 All-Filipino, 2003 Reinforced, 2007 Philippine); PBA Most Valuable Player (1996); PBA Best Player of the Conference (1997 Commissioner's); 2x PBA Finals Most Valuable Player (1996 Governors', 1997 Governors'); 6x PBA Mythical First Team (1994-1999); PBA Mythical Second Team (2003); 7× PBA All-Star (1994, 1995, 1996, 1997, 1998, 1999, 2001); 5x PBA All-Defensive Team (1994, 1996-1997, 1999, 2005); PBA Two-Ball Competition Co-Champion (w/ Kenneth Duremdes; 1999); PBA Grand Slam champion (1996); 50 Greatest Players in PBA History (2000 selection); PBA All-time leader in career steals; 2× UAAP champion (1991, 1992); UAAP Most Valuable Player (1991); UAAP Rookie of the Year (1989); 4× PBL champion (1990 Challenge, 1991 Maharlika, 1992 Philippine, 1992 Invitational); 3× PBL MVP (1990 Challenge, 1991 Challenge, 1992 Invitational); No. 14 retired by the Alaska Aces; No. 14 retired by the FEU Tamaraws; As assistant coach: 7x PBA champion coach (2012 Commissioner's, 2013 Governors', 2014 Philippine, 2014 Commissioner's, 2014 Governors', 2018 Governors', 2026 Commissioner's); PCCL champion (2015); UAAP champions (2015)

Johnny Abarrientos (born July 17, 1970) is a Filipino retired professional basketball player in the Philippine Basketball Association (PBA). He was also a many-time member of the Philippine National team, and was the 1996 PBA Most Valuable Player, becoming the shortest player to win the league's highest individual award. He is known by many as the Flying A when he started playing for the Alaska Milkmen in 1993. He is currently an assistant coach for the Barangay Ginebra San Miguel and for the FEU Tamaraws.

In college, Abarrientos played for FEU. He won Rookie of the Year in 1989 then led FEU to back-to-back titles in 1991 (as the league MVP) and in 1992. He then continued his amateur career in the semi-professional Philippine Basketball League, where he won four titles and three MVPs.

Abarrientos was then selected third overall in the 1993 PBA Draft by Alaska. He helped Alaska win nine championships, including a grand slam in 1996. He then won one title with the Pop Cola Panthers in 2002 and two titles with Ginebra in 2003 and 2007. He retired as the PBA's all-time leader in steals and has his #14 jersey retired by Alaska.

== Early life ==
Abarrientos was born the seventh of nine children and one of five boys. He would watch his older brothers (who were all point guards) play basketball in small commercial leagues as their water boy. Inspired by them, he started playing basketball as well, and led his high school, NCBA, to a league championship.

Abarrientos then successfully tried out for the FEU Baby Tamaraws. He led them to a University Athletic Association of the Philippines (UAAP) juniors title in 1987, their first in 12 years. When it was time to consider colleges, he considered transferring to Ateneo as it was his dream school. He decided against it as it would be too risky. However, he almost quit schooling as his family could not afford to pay for his studies until FEU gave him a scholarship. Still, his father, Johnny Sr., did not want him to play basketball.

== Amateur career ==
Abarrientos played college basketball for the FEU Tamaraws, impressing fans with his dribbling skills and playmaking abilities. During his first year with FEU, he hid the fact that he was playing for FEU from his father. As he became more popular and the team became successful, he could no longer hide it from his father. He eventually confessed to him and offered him a ticket to watch him play in the finals. The whole family came to watch him in the finals. Although they lost the Season 52 finals to DLSU, he won the Rookie of the Year award.

Alongside future pro Victor Pablo, Abarrientos led the Tamaraws to back-to-back UAAP crowns in 1991 and 1992. He also won the UAAP MVP award in 1991. When the league lowered the age requirement from 23 years old to 21, this opened the door for him to enter the PBA. His #14 jersey was retired years later by FEU on July 6, 2011.

Abarrientos also played in the semi-professional Philippine Basketball League for the Crispa Redmanizers and Triple-V while still with FEU before jumping ship to the PBA. With Crispa, he became the first player in the PBL to record a triple-double with 17 points, 10 rebounds, and 10 assists.

== Professional career ==
=== Alaska Aces (1993–2001) ===
The Alaska Milkmen selected Abarrientos third overall in the 1993 PBA Draft. Coach Tim Cone was convinced that he would be the future of their point guard position. Alaska then dropped Frankie Lim, a key member of its first champion team, to make room for Abarrientos. He showed impressive performances in his rookie season.

From 1994 to 1998, Abarrientos led Alaska to nine PBA titles, including the grand slam winning 1996 season. He was named as the Most Valuable Player during the same season, averaging 14.6 points, 4.9 rebounds, 5.4 assists, and 1.4 steals and becoming the first guard to win the award.

In 1997, talks of Abarrientos' potential participation in the NBA came when Charlotte Hornets scout Joe Bettancourt offered Abarrientos a contract to participate in the Hornets' pre-season camp. However, talks stalled out after Bettancourt sold his shares in his agency with Charlotte and Abarrientos was never called back. In 1997, Abarrientos averaged a career high 16.7 points and a league-leading 8.6 assists per game. He also won the Best Player of the Conference award in the Commissioner's Cup.

Two years later, Abarrientos was named in the PBA's 25 Greatest Players of All-Time as part of the league's anniversary on April 9, 2000. During the same year, Abarrientos' career started to diminish despite the Aces winning the All-Filipino Cup crown. In what would be his last season with Alaska, he averaged 7.9 points, 4.2 rebounds, 5.0 assists, and 35 minutes in 43 games. After the season, Abarrientos and Poch Juinio were swapped to the Pop Cola Panthers for Ali Peek and Jon Ordonio.

=== Pop Cola Panthers (2001) ===
Abarrientos was tasked with improving Pop Cola's play, which had put them at the bottom of the league standings in previous seasons. He put on a decent performance in his only season with the Panthers in 2001. With Rudy Hatfield and former Alaska teammates Lastimosa and Juinio around, they led Pop Cola to a third-place finish in the All-Filipino Cup. For the season, he averaged 9.6 points in 44 games for Pop Cola.

=== Coca-Cola Tigers (2002–2006) ===
After the year, Pop Cola was bought by the San Miguel Corporation and was renamed as the Coca-Cola Tigers. Prior to joining the Tigers in 2002, Abarrientos was part of the RP Training Pool for the Busan Asian Games but was later cut. He later returned to lead Coca-Cola to a third-place finish in the Governor's Cup. In the All-Filipino, he led his team to the finals against Alaska. After he scored 20 points in the first half of Game 1, he left the game with a double facial fracture and was sidelined for the rest of the series. The Tigers went on to win the crown 3–1 over his former team. He then went underwent successful surgery, but required months of therapy and almost made him consider retiring.

In 2003, Abarrientos and his team led the Tigers to the 2003 Reinforced Conference title. By the 2004–05 season, injuries and decline had hampered Abarrientos and he saw his minutes diminished. In the 2005–06 season, Abarrientos shared point guard duties with fellow FEU alumni Dennis Miranda, a rookie, and Dale Singson.

=== Barangay Ginebra Kings (2006–2010) ===
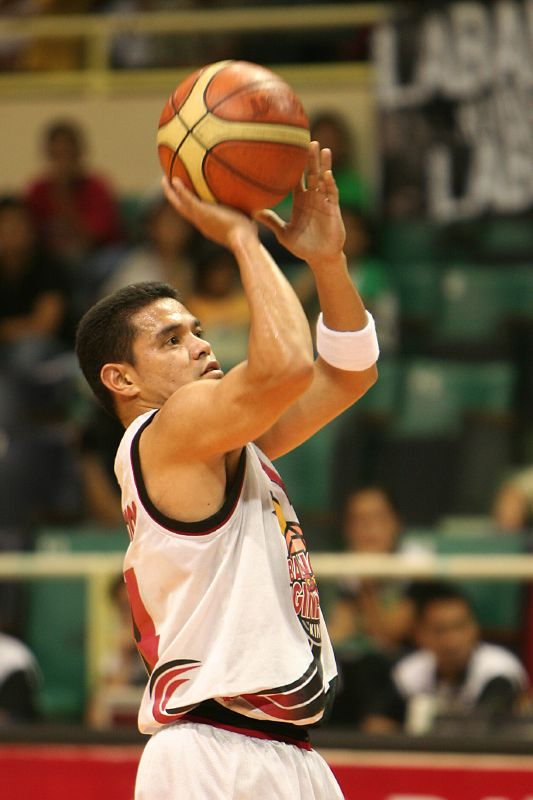
Abarrientos with Ginebra in 2007

Two weeks before the start of the PBA season, the Coca-Cola Tigers released Abarrientos. Five days after his release, Abarrientos was signed by Coke's sister team Ginebra to a contract for the 2006–07 season after none of the non-SMC teams showed interest in signing him.

He played reserve role to lead point guard and 2009 Most Valuable Player Jayjay Helterbrand, as his court generalship gave additional factor in the Kings' line-up. The Flying A made a memorable moment when he surpassed Ramon Fernandez as the all-time leader in steals on February 5, 2007, as Ginebra defeated the Talk 'N Text Phone Pals and won their semis matchup, 4–2. Ginebra would go on to win the 2006-07 Philippine Cup against San Miguel, 4–2, with Abarrientos hitting a three-pointer in a crucial stretch of the final game.

Afterwards, Abarrientos went into semi-retirement, serving in the coaching staff of Ginebra. Before the 2009–10 PBA season started, he announced his retirement, ending his very successful 16 years in the PBA. But, during the KFC Philippine Cup 2009-10 of the PBA, when Celino Cruz, Jayjay Helterbrand and Mark Caguioa got injured, head coach Jong Uichico brought back Abarrientos to the active roster as their point guard.

== National team career ==
In 1989, Abarrientos was considered for the Philippines' youth team. However, he did not make the final 12 for that year's SEA Games and the Philippines lost out on a gold medal. Two years later, with the 1991 SEA Games being held in Manila, he got his chance. Although he injured both his ankles in the semifinals, he was still able to help the Philippines reclaim the gold medal.

During his second season in the PBA, Abarrientos was included in the RP National team bound for the 1994 Asian Games.

Abarrientos was then named to the Centennial Team by Tim Cone, who was still coaching him at Alaska at the time. The team went on to win the bronze medal in the 1998 Asian Games.

In 2002, Abarrientos was part of the RP Training Pool for the Busan Asian Games but was later cut.

== PBA career statistics ==
Legend
GP	Games played	MPG	Minutes per game
FG%	Field-goal percentage	3P%	3-point field-goal percentage	FT%	Free-throw percentage
RPG	Rebounds per game	APG	Assists per game	SPG	Steals per game
BPG	Blocks per game	PPG	Points per game	**Bold**	Career high

=== Season-by-season averages ===
Year	Team	GP	MPG	FG%	3P%	FT%	RPG	APG	SPG	BPG	PPG
1993	Alaska	52	35.9	.489	.304	.801	4.8	**6.6**	**2.7**	.0	16.1
1994	Alaska	68	37.2	.458	.329	.843	4.3	6.1	1.8	.1	15.8
1995	Alaska	**74**	38.0	.453	.295	.878	4.1	5.6	1.8	.1	16.0
1996	Alaska	71	37.7	.437	.230	.864	4.9	5.4	1.4	**.2**	14.6
1997	Alaska	60	**40.1**	.508	.333	.879	4.6	6.0	2.2	.0	**16.7**
1998	Alaska	49	38.6	.457	.315	.922	**5.0**	5.0	2.1	.0	13.1
1999	Alaska	53	38.1	.429	.312	.860	4.8	4.5	1.9	.1	12.8
2000	Alaska	43	35.0	.381	.233	.785	4.2	5.1	1.8	.1	7.9
2001	Pop Cola	44	33.2	.357	.248	.859	4.0	4.2	1.7	.0	9.6
2002	Coca-Cola	31	24.4	.396	.367	.774	3.5	3.5	1.5	.1	8.1
2003	Coca-Cola	51	26.0	.371	.292	.746	3.2	4.6	1.7	.1	7.4
2004–05	Coca-Cola	65	30.0	.346	.312	.824	3.9	6.3	2.5	.0	7.5
2005–06	Coca-Cola	31	19.4	.370	.342	.684	2.4	3.5	1.0	.0	6.5
2006–07	Barangay Ginebra	43	19.6	.360	.327	.878	3.2	3.1	1.4	.0	5.3
2007–08	Barangay Ginebra	5	6.6	.273	.250	—	.2	1.0	.2	.0	1.6
2008–09	Barangay Ginebra	1	13.0	**.750**	**.500**	**1.000**	.0	2.0	.0	.0	8.0
2009–10	Barangay Ginebra	14	16.6	.383	.190	.833	1.9	2.9	1.2	.0	3.9
Career		742	33.0	.429	.303	.850	4.1	5.1	1.8	.1	11.6

== Retirement and coaching career ==
After Abarrientos was elevated as assistant coach of the Barangay Ginebra Kings, he was invited by Alaska management for the Alaska 25th Anniversary Reunion as a result of their triumphant title conquest in the 2010 PBA Fiesta Conference against the San Miguel Beermen. In that occasion, Alaska management decided to retire his #14 jersey because of his contributions to the team including his 1996 Grand Slam conquest and his MVP award during that same year.

In 2011, for the 37th season of the PBA, Abarrientos joined the B-Meg Llamados as an assistant coach, together with former teammate Jeffrey Cariaso, to help their former coach Tim Cone install his triangle offense in the B-Meg squad. They won four titles together, including a grand slam. When Cone left for Ginebra, he stayed with the team. He won one more title with them in 2018 during the 2018 Governors' Cup with Chito Victolero as head coach.

In the middle of a March 2023 game against the Converge FiberXers, Abarrientos gestured with a middle finger at the opponent's African-American import Jamaal Franklin. Abarrientos was later criticized by many fans for racism and the league fined him ₱10,000.

In 2025, after 14 years with the B-Meg / Purefoods / Magnolia franchise, Abarrientos joined the coaching staff of Ginebra, still led by Cone. At Ginebra, he got the opportunity to coach his nephew, RJ.

Since 2011, Abarrientos has been an assistant coach at his alma mater, FEU.

== Personal life ==
Abarrientos is married and they have three children together. His nephew RJ also became a PBA player. Johnny helped raise him after RJ's father died while he was in high school. Johnny's uncle, Virgilio "Haba-Haba" Abarrientos, was also a PBA player.

While he was playing, Abarrientos bred fighting cocks as a side business. He also owned a farm.

== Major accomplishments ==
- UAAP Champion
- 1996 PBA MVP
- 12-Time PBA Champion
- Three-Time Member of the RP National Team
- PBA All Time Leaders in Steals (1,302)
