= Richie Ticzon =

Filipino basketball player and coach

Richard Anthony M. Ticzon
FEU Tamaraws
- Title: Assistant coach
- League: UAAP

Personal information
- Born: September 8, 1971 (age 55) Pasig, Rizal, Philippines
- Listed height: 5 ft 8 in (1.73 m)
- Listed weight: 160 lb (73 kg)

Career information
- College: Ateneo
- PBA draft: 1994: 1st round, 4th overall pick
- Drafted by: Pepsi Mega Hotshots
- Playing career: 1994–2002
- Position: Point guard
- Number: 11
- Coaching career: 2005–present

Career history

Playing
- 1994–1995: Coney Island/Purefoods
- 1996–1998: Formula Shell Zoom Masters
- 1999–2000: Cagayan de Oro Amigos
- 2001–2002: Alaska Aces

Coaching
- 2005–2006: San Miguel Beermen (assistant)
- 2006–2009: Coca-Cola Tigers (assistant)
- 2014: GlobalPort Batang Pier (interim)
- 2015–2018: FEU (assistant)
- 2018–2019: Navotas Clutch
- 2023–present: Quezon Huskers (assistant)
- 2025–present: FEU (assistant)

Career highlights
- As player: 2x PBA champion (1994 Commissioner's, 1998 Governors'); PBA Comeback Player of the Year (1996); PBA Obstacle/Buzzer-Beater Contest Co-Winner with Ato Agustin (1994); As assistant coach: PCCL champion (2015); UAAP champion (2015)

Richard Anthony Ticzon (born September 8, 1971 in Pasig) is a Filipino former professional basketball player and coach. Nicknamed the Velvet Touch for his outside shooting, Ticzon played college ball at the Ateneo de Manila University.

== Playing career ==
He was selected fourth overall by Pepsi Mega in the 1994 PBA draft. Ticzon was immediately traded to Purefoods along with second round picks in 1995 and 1996 for Dindo Pumaren and Dwight Lago. At Purefoods, he was reunited with his Ateneo coach, Chot Reyes. He showed his worth during the Commissioner's Cup finals against Alaska Milkmen by banging in treys propelling Purefoods' late rallies and finishing kicks.

Beginning the 1996 season, Ticzon had trouble finding a team at the start of the year before hooking up with Shell in what could easily be the comeback story of the year. He went on to star in the team's surprise finals stint in the Commissioner's Cup, scoring a triple that tied the count with 10.5 seconds to go in the knockout game against Ginebra San Miguel and his game-winning fadeaway jumper late in Game Six of the finals against Alaska was one of the year's highlight plays. The comeback kid of the 1996 season made the most prolific season of his pro career as a starter for coach Chito Narvasa. With veteran Gerry Esplana arriving in the 1998 season following a trade, Richie's minutes on the playing court suffered a decline.

In 1999, the former Ateneo scoring machine has gotten his release to play in the MBA via the Cagayan de Oro Amigos. He was then signed up by the Alaska Aces in 2001.

== Coaching career ==
Ticzon would later turn to coaching after his playing years were over. He became an assistant coach at FEU, and would later serve as assistant to coach Junel Baculi at GlobalPort. Despite his lack of head coaching experience, team owner Mikee Romero installed him as the interim head coach for the Batang Pier after the team fired Baculi just a week before the start of the 2013-14 PBA season. In his only conference with the team, he compiled a 5-9 win–loss record and helped them reach the All-Filipino Conference quarterfinals as a seventh-seed team. He was then replaced by Pido Jarencio before the start of the next conference.

=== PBA ===
Team	Season	Conference										
Team	Season	Conference	GP	W	L	PCT	Finish	PG	W	L	PCT	Results
GlobalPort	2013–14	Philippine Cup	14	5	9	.357	7th	1	0	1	.000	Lost in the quarterfinals with twice to beat disadvantage
Career Total			14	5	9	.357	Playoff Total	1	0	1	.000	0 championship
