= 1994 Alaska Milkmen season =

- Head coach: Tim Cone
- General manager: Joaqui Trillo
- Owner: Wilfred Steven Uytengsu

All-Filipino Cup results
- Record: 13–10 (56.5%)
- Place: 3rd
- Playoff finish: Semifinals

Commissioner's Cup results
- Record: 15–9 (62.5%)
- Place: 2nd
- Playoff finish: Finals

Governors Cup results
- Record: 17–9 (65.4%)
- Place: 1st
- Playoff finish: Champions

Alaska Milkmen seasons

The 1994 Alaska Milkmen season was the 9th season of the franchise in the Philippine Basketball Association (PBA).

== Draft picks ==
Round	Pick	Player	College
1	5	Edward Juinio	UP
1	6	Merwin Castelo	San Beda College
2	13	Cris Bolado	NU

== Notable dates ==
March 6: The Milkmen unravelled an array of quality rookies in their first win of the regular season as they clipped Shell Rimula-X, 119–95, in the second game of the opening double-header. The win was Alaska's 11th straight after sweeping all their pre-season games, including the Guam Invitationals.

July 19: Alaska weathered a brief uprising by Swift late in the third quarter and leaned on import Marques Bragg and playmaker Johnny Abarrientos in the final period to post a 94–84 victory and put the Milkmen on top of the Commissioners Cup standings with their sixth triumph in eight games.

== Finals' return ==
After three seasons and a total of seven conferences on non-finals appearance, the Alaska Milkmen return to the championship series in the Commissioner's Cup. Their import, the imposing Marques Bragg, help the Milkmen top the eliminations with nine wins and two losses and emerge with the league-best 14-5 won-loss record after the semifinal round. Alaska lost to Purefoods Tender Juicy Hotdogs in the title series in five games.

== 2nd championship ==
For the first time in five years, the Milkmen gambled on a new import Sean Gay in the third conference instead of Sean Chambers. Alaska lost two of their first three games in the Governor's Cup with Gay and the team decided to bring back old-hand Chambers to replace him.

The Milkmen for the second straight conference are back in the championship round, this time against the Swift Mighty Meaties, Sean Chambers led Alaska to their second PBA title by winning over Swift in six games.

== Roster ==
1994 Alaska Milkmen roster
Players

Pos.	#	POB	Name	Height	Weight	DOB (YYYY–MM–DD)	From
G/F	4	(Philippines)	Merwin Castelo	6 ft 2 in (1.88 m)			San Beda
G	5	(Philippines)	Gilbert Reyes	5 ft 8 in (1.73 m)			Ateneo
G/F	6	(Philippines)	Jojo Lastimosa	6 ft 1 in (1.85 m)			USJ–R
G	7	(Philippines)	Roehl Gomez	6 ft 0 in (1.83 m)			Cebu
G/F	9	(Philippines)	Johnedel Cardel	6 ft 0 in (1.83 m)			De La Salle
C	12	(Philippines)	Dickie Bachmann	6 ft 5 in (1.96 m)			De La Salle
G	14	(Philippines)	Johnny Abarrientos	5 ft 8 in (1.73 m)			Far Eastern
F	16	(Philippines)	Bong Hawkins	6 ft 3 in (1.91 m)			UPHSD
C	24	(Philippines)	Cris Bolado	6 ft 7 in (2.01 m)			National-U
C	32	(Philippines)	Poch Juinio	6 ft 5 in (1.96 m)			UP Diliman
F	34	(Philippines)	Stevenson Solomon	6 ft 4 in (1.93 m)			San Sebastian
C	50	(Philippines)	Alex Araneta	6 ft 6 in (1.98 m)			Ateneo
F	54	(Philippines)	Dondon Ampalayo	6 ft 3 in (1.91 m)			USJ–R

Coaches

Head coach

- (United States) Tim Cone

Assistant coach(es)

- (Philippines) Joel Banal
- (Philippines) Aric del Rosario

Team manager

- (Philippines) Joaquin Trillo

Legend

- (C) Team captain
- Injured

=== Recruited imports ===
Name	Tournament	No.	Pos.	Ht.	College	Duration
Marques Bragg	Commissioner's Cup	25	Forward-Center	6"5'	Providence College	June 19 to September 9
Sean Gay	Governors Cup	13	Guard-Forward	6"1'	Texas Tech University	September 29 to October 4
Sean Chambers	Governors Cup	20	Forward	6"1'	Cal Poly San Luis Obispo	October 7 to December 18
