= 1994 Swift Mighty Meaties season =

- Head coach: Yeng Guiao; Derrick Pumaren (Governors' Cup)
- General manager: Elmer Yanga
- Owner: RFM Corporation

All Filipino Cup results
- Record: 13–11 (54.2%)
- Place: 4th
- Playoff finish: Semifinals

Commissioner's Cup results
- Record: 12–11 (52.2%)
- Place: 3rd
- Playoff finish: Semifinals

Governor's Cup results
- Record: 15–11 (57.7%)
- Place: 2nd
- Playoff finish: Runner-up

Swift Mighty Meaties seasons

The 1994 Swift Mighty Meaties season was the 5th season of the franchise in the Philippine Basketball Association (PBA).

== Draft picks ==
Round	Pick	Player	College
1	3	Emmanuel Victoria	San Beda

== Occurrences ==
When Swift lost to Coney Island, 89–101, at the start of the semifinal round of the All-Filipino Cup on April 19, the players and coaching staff feel bad about the loss and vowed to shaved their heads if they lose again, the Swift players responded as the Mighty Meaties won five in a row to clinch a playoff for the finals berth. On May 6, the San Miguel Beermen ended their winning streak with a 97–87 victory. In their last semifinal outing against Coney Island on May 8, the Swift players and coaching staff showed up in bald-headed and scored a 92–84 victory over the Ice Cream Stars.

The defending Commissioner's Cup champions bring back Ronnie Thompkins and he led Swift to four straight wins until he got suspended for two games in an incident involving him and Pepsi Mega's Rey Cuenco.

Swift lost two of their first three games in the Commissioner's Cup semifinals with Thompkins being injured and was replaced following Swift's loss to San Miguel on August 9. Thompkins' replacement was Stan Rose, a 1993 CBA first-round draft pick. Rose played only one game and scored 31 points in Swift's 105–103 win over Shell, he was sent home in favor of their former import Bernard Thompson.

Coach Yeng Guiao resigned from his coaching position with Swift after the Commissioner's Cup and moved over to the Pepsi Mega camp as both teams swapped coaches. Pepsi Mega coach Derrick Pumaren becomes the new head coach of Swift beginning the Governor's Cup.

== Notable dates ==
July 3: Swift rolled over lackluster Pepsi Mega, 96–90, and jumped to the solo lead in the Commissioner's Cup with their fourth straight victory. Import Ronnie Thompkins registered the first triple-double of the conference with 21 points, 14 rebounds and 16 assists.

July 5: With import Ronnie Thompkins serving the first of his two-game suspensions, the defending champions rose to the occasion in carving out a 108–106 win over Tondeña 65 Rhum that showed up with the sweet-shooting new import Mitchell Wiggins, who debut with 62 points but hardly got local support. The victory by Swift preserve an unblemished slate of five wins without a loss.

October 14: Import Jay Edwards scored 69 points and shot 13 triples as Swift defeated Tondeña 65 Rhum, 135–124.

== Runner-up finish ==
Swift had enlisted the services of Jay Edwards as their import in the Governor's Cup. Edwards played six games and put in fine numbers. However, the ballclub decided to replace him with Herb Jones. The Mighty Meaties played the Alaska Milkmen in the Governor's Cup finals and they lost in the championship series in six games.

== Roster ==
1994 Swift Mighty Meaties roster
Players

Pos.	#	POB	Name	Height	Weight	DOB (YYYY–MM–DD)	From
C	4	(Philippines)	Bonel Balingit	6 ft 9 in (2.06 m)			Visayas
G	8	(Philippines)	Al Solis	5 ft 11 in (1.80 m)			Visayas
G	9	(Philippines)	Boybits Victoria	5 ft 11 in (1.80 m)			San Beda
F	10	(Philippines)	Enrique Reyes	6 ft 4 in (1.93 m)			Ateneo
F	11	(Philippines)	Nelson Asaytono	6 ft 3 in (1.91 m)			Manila
F	13	(Philippines)	Elpidio Villamin	6 ft 2 in (1.88 m)
G	14	(Philippines)	Rudy Distrito	5 ft 11 in (1.80 m)			UE
G	15	(Philippines)	Juancho Estrada	5 ft 11 in (1.80 m)			Adamson
G	16	(Philippines)	Teroy Albarillo	5 ft 10 in (1.78 m)			Mindanao
F	18	(Philippines)	Vergel Meneses	6 ft 3 in (1.91 m)			José Rizal
F	24	(Philippines)	Richard Bognot	6 ft 4 in (1.93 m)
C	35	(Philippines)	Zaldy Realubit	6 ft 6 in (1.98 m)			USJ–R

Coaches

Head coach

- (Philippines) Derrick Pumaren

Assistant coach(es)

- (Philippines) Gabby Velasco
- (Philippines) Arturo Valenzona

Legend

- (C) Team captain
- Injured

=== Recruited imports ===
Name	Tournament	No.	Pos.	Ht.	College	Duration
Ronnie Thompkins	Commissioner's Cup	44	Center-Forward	6"5'	Fort Hays State	June 19 to August 9
Stan Rose	Commissioner's Cup	3	Forward	6"4'	Weber State	August 14 (one game)
Bernard Thompson	Commissioner's Cup	34	Center-Forward	6"4'	Fresno State	August 19–26
Jay Edwards	Governors Cup	3	Guard	6"3'	University of Indiana	September 29 to October 14
Herb Jones	Governors Cup	34	Forward-Center	6"2'	University of Cincinnati	October 16 to December 18
