= 1994 PBA draft =

Player selection in Philippine basketball

General information
- Date: January 16, 1994
- Location: Crystal Ballroom, Hyatt Hotel, Manila
- Network: Vintage Sports on PTV

Overview
- League: Philippine Basketball Association
- First selection: Noli Locsin (Tondeña 65)

The 1994 Philippine Basketball Association (PBA) rookie draft was an event at which teams drafted players from the amateur ranks. It was held on January 16, 1994, at the Crystal Ballroom of the Hyatt Hotel in Manila.

== Round 1 ==
Pick	Player	Country of origin*	PBA team	College
1	Manuel Luis Locsin	Philippines	Tondeña 65 Rhum	De La Salle
2	Reynaldo Evangelista	Philippines	Coney Island Ice Cream Stars	Santo Tomas
3	Emmanuel Victoria Jr.	Philippines	Swift Mighty Meaties	San Beda
4	Richard Ticzon	Philippines	Pepsi Mega Hotshots	Ateneo de Manila
5	Edward Juinio	Philippines	Alaska Milkmen	UP Diliman
6	Merwin Castelo	Philippines	Alaska Milkmen	San Beda
7	Expedito Falcasantos	Philippines	Sta. Lucia Realtors	Cebu Central
8	Vicente Hizon	Philippines	Coney Island Ice Cream Stars	Ateneo de Manila

== Round 2 ==
Pick	Player	Country of origin*	PBA team	College
9	Wilmer Ong	Philippines	Tondeña 65 Rhum	Saint La Salle
10	Henrico Gascon	Philippines	Shell Helix	Far Eastern
11	Jesus Baglayon	Philippines	Sta. Lucia Realtors	
12	Cris Bade	Philippines	Shell Helix	San Sebastian
13	Cris Bolado	Philippines	Alaska Milkmen	National
14	Peter Naron	Philippines	Coney Island Ice Cream Stars	Visayas
15	Mike Otto	Philippines	San Miguel Beermen	Far Eastern
16	Rudolf Belmonte	Philippines	Swift Mighty Meaties	Santo Tomas

== Round 3 ==
Pick	Player	Country of origin*	PBA team	College
17	Jonas Mariano	Philippines	Tondeña 65 Rhum	De La Salle
18	Eric Quiday	Philippines	Shell Helix	Perpetual Help
19	Vidal Labrada	Philippines	Sta. Lucia Realtors	San Jose-Recoletos
20	Beltran Reyes	Philippines	Coney Island Ice Cream Stars	Santo Tomas
21	Alfredo Mislang	Philippines	Swift Mighty Meaties	Perpetual Help

== Round 4 ==
Pick	Player	Country of origin*	PBA team	College
22	Renato Cabaluna	Philippines	Tondeña 65 Rum	Santo Tomas
23	Octavio Marasigan	Philippines	Shell Helix	Mapúa
24	Ramon Singson	Philippines	Sta. Lucia Realtors	Santo Tomas
25	Genesis Sasuman	Philippines	Swift Mighty Meaties	Letran

== Round 5 ==
Pick	Player	Country of origin*	PBA team	College
26	Porfirio Marzan	Philippines	Tondeña 65 Rum	Baguio
27	Arnold Padaong	Philippines	Shell Helix	Far Eastern

== Notes ==
- Amateur standouts Marlou Aquino and Edward Joseph Feihl, both of Adamson University, withdrew their applications.
- Pepsi's rights to Richard Anthony Ticzon, including second-round draft picks in the 1995 and 1996 drafts, were traded to Purefoods for Dindo Pumaren and Dwight Lago.
- In another draft day trade, Pepsi traded its second round rights to Shell for Rey Cuenco.

== Sources ==
- "Ballclubs stunned by Feihl, Aquino decision," The Philippine Star, January 6, 1994.
- "Ginebra starts new build-up with Locsin," The Philippine Star, January 17, 1994.
