= Virgil Villavicencio =

Filipino basketball player

NLEX Road Warriors
- Position: Senior consultant
- League: PBA

Career information
- College: De La Salle
- Coaching career: 1989–1996; 2003–2005

Career history

Coaching
- 1989–1993: Ateneo HS
- 1991–1992: Triple-V Foodmasters
- 1993–1996: De La Salle
- 1994: Philippines
- 2003–2005: Talk 'N Text Phone Pals (assistant)

Career highlights
- As head coach: Metro Manila Basketball League champion (1989–1993); As assistant coach: PBA champion (2003 All-Filipino); 3× PBL Champion (1991 Challenge Cup, 1991-1992 Philippine Cup, 1992 Invitational Cup); As executive: PBA champion (2008–09 Philippine); As player: NCAA champion (1974–75)

Virgil Vargas Villavicencio is a Filipino former collegiate basketball player and coach. He is the current senior consultant of the NLEX Road Warriors in the Philippine Basketball Association. Villavicencio is also a former head coach of the La Salle Green Archers in the UAAP and led the team to consecutive runner-up finishes in 1994 and 1995.

== Basketball career ==
Villavicencio played for the La Salle Green Archers in the collegiate ranks between 1972 and 1976, and was part of the 1974-75 NCAA championship-winning team, alongside former PBA legend Lim Eng Beng.

== Coaching career ==
Villavicencio coached the Ateneo Blue Eaglets high school basketball team to five consecutive titles in the Metro Manila Basketball League (1989–1993) and four consecutive runner-up spots in the UAAP Juniors Division (1989–1992). In 1993, he was appointed head coach of the La Salle Green Archers, and in his first year guided the team to a third-place finish in a tournament dominated by the UST. In the next season, 1994-95, he led the team even closer to the title, as they won the first of a three-game Final series against UST, before losing the second game by 14 points and then the deciding game by a single point. He repeated this feat in the next season, as La Salle again beat UST in the first game of the finals, only to lose the second game by four points and the third game by three points to finish runner-up for the second season running.

He coached the Philippines national basketball team at the 1994 SEABA Championship where the team which had Allen Patrimonio, Rensy Bajar, Gerard Francisco, Romel Adducul and Joel Villanueva among its roster finished fourth.

Alongside his collegiate coaching duties, Villavicencio was assistant coach of the Triple-V team in the Philippine Basketball League, helping them to championships in the 1991 and 1992 seasons. In 1995, he coached the Philippine youth national basketball team at the 13th Asian Youth Basket Ball Championship.

After this, Villavicencio moved on to the Philippine Basketball Association, where he was assistant coach of Talk 'N Text (then known as the Phone Pals) as they won the 2003 All-Filipino Cup. The team continued to perform well, finishing third in the transitional 2004 conference and reaching the finals of the 2004-05 Philippine Cup only to lose 4-2 to Barangay Ginebra Kings. Villavicencio left the coaching staff in 2005 but returned to Talk 'N Text as part of the management team in 2008 until 2010, when he was assigned to Meralco Bolts. He served as Bolts' manager until 2014. He was later reassigned in 2015, and stepped down after winning many championships and replaced by Gabby Cui in 2019.

== Coaching record ==
=== Collegiate record ===
Season	Team	Eliminations					Playoffs				
Season	Team	GP	W	L	PCT	Finish	GP	W	L	PCT	Results
1993	DLSU	14	8	6	.571	3rd	—	—	—	—	Third^{a}
1994	DLSU	12	10	2	.833	1st	4	2	2	.500	Runner-Up
1995	DLSU	14	10	4	.714	2nd	4	2	2	.500	Runner-Up
Totals		40	28	12	.700		8	4	4	.500	0 championships

^{a}As UST swept the regular season and automatically declared champion the Archers ended up as 3rd place

Preceded by Gabby Velasco	De La Salle Green Archers men's basketball head coach 1993-1995	Succeeded by Jong Uichico
