= List of restaurant chains in the Philippines =

This is a list of notable restaurant chains in the Philippines. A restaurant chain is a set of related restaurants with the same name in many different locations that are either under shared corporate ownership (e.g., McDonald's in the United States) or franchising agreements. Typically, the restaurants within a chain are built to a standard format through architectural prototype development and offer a standard menu and/or services.

== Current chains ==
Restaurant chain	Type	Year started (Note: For restaurant chains originating outside the Philippines, "Year started" refers to the year of introduction (i.e., opening of first-ever branch) in the Philippines.)	Owned by (Note: Data indicated below mostly refers to the latest business / franchise owner)	Background / Notes
1st Colonial Grill	Casual dining	2004	24K Foods Corporation	
24 Chicken	Fast food	2017		
Amber	Fast food	1988	Amber Golden Chain of Restaurants	
Andok's	Fast food	1985		
Angel's Pizza	Casual dining	2009		
The Aristocrat Restaurant	Casual dining	1936		
Army Navy	Mexican fast food	2009		Opened its first store in Tagaytay City
Avocadoria	Desserts	2019		
Bacolod Chicken Inasal	Casual dining	1993	Beaming Dreams Corporation	
Black Scoop Cafe	Coffee chain	2018		
Bonchon	Korean cuisine	2010	Scott Tan	Korean fried chicken restaurant
Bo's Coffee	Coffee chain	1996		
Botejyu	Japanese cuisine	2016	Viva International Food and Restaurants	
Buddy's	Casual dining	1985		Filipino restaurant specializing in Pancit Lucban
Burger King	Fast food	1997	Jollibee Foods Corporation	American-based multinational chain of hamburger fast food restaurants.
Burger Machine	Fast Food	1981	Gilmore Food Corporation	
Cabalen	Buffet	1986	Cabalen Group of Companies	
California Pizza Kitchen	Casual dining, American/Italian	1999	Pi Co., Inc.	
ChaYi	Tea shop	2024	Winchell Tan	Specializes in authentic Chinese tea bases (such as Da Hong Pao and Pu'er) and modern tea lattes using rock sugar.
Chili's	Casual dining, American/Tex-Mex cuisine	1996	Am‑Phil Group	
Chooks-to-Go	Fast food	2008	Bounty Fresh Group Holdings Inc.	Originally established as rotisserie chicken business in 2008. Opened first dine-in restaurant in November 2021
Chowking	Chinese cuisine	1985	Jollibee Foods Corporation	
Classic Savory	Casual dining	1950	Ramon C. Tan	
Congo Grille	Casual dining	1999	Congo Grille Bar & Restaurant	
Conti's Bakeshop & Restaurant	Casual dining	1997		
Dairy Queen	Desserts		Philippine Pizza, Inc.	
Dencio's	Casual dining	1991	Max's Group	
Din Tai Fung	Chinese cuisine	2015	The Moment Group	
Eng Bee Tin	Deli	1912		
Fruitas Fresh	Juice bar	2000	Fruitas Holdings	
Gerry's Grill	Casual dining	1997	Gerry Apolinario	
Goldilocks Bakeshop	Bakery	1966		
Graceland	Fast food	1972	Graceland Food Industries, Inc.	
Greenwich Pizza	Italian cuisine	1971	Jollibee Foods Corporation	
Jamba Juice	Fast food	2011	Max's Group	
Jollibee	Fast food	1978	Jollibee Foods Corporation	Fast food which serves American-influenced Filipino cuisine. An offshoot of a Magnolia ice cream parlor franchise established by Tony Tan Caktiong in 1975.
Kenny Rogers Roasters	Casual dining	1995	Epicurean Partners Exchange Inc.	
KFC	Fast food	1967	RAMCAR Food Group	American fast food chain owned by Yum! Brands
Krispy Kreme	Fast food	2006	Max's Group	
Kuya J Restaurant	Casual dining	2013	Kuya J Group Holdings Inc.	
L.C. Big Mak	Fast food	1984	L.C. Big Mak Burger Inc.	
Lido Cocina Tsina	Casual dining	1936	Panciteria Lido Chinese Cuisine Co.	
Ling Nam	Fast food	1950	Fruitas Holdings	
Mang Inasal	Fast food	2003	Jollibee Foods Corporation	
Max's Restaurant	Casual dining	1945	Max's Group	
McDonald's	Fast food	1981	Golden Arches Development Corporation	American fast food chain. Master franchise in the Philippines is owned by a local company associated with George Yang.
Mixue Ice Cream & Tea		2023		Chinese-based ice cream and frozen dessert shop.
Orange Brutus	Fast food	1980	Brutus Food Systems Inc.	One of first fastfood burger chain in Cebu
Pancake House	Casual dining	1974	Max's Group	
Peri-Peri Chicken	Casual dining	2005		
Pizza Hut	Casual dining		Philippine Pizza, Inc.	
Popeyes	Fast food	2019		Multinational chain of fried chicken fast food restaurants founded by Al Copeland. Closed its Philippine branches in 2007 due to a conflict with its local franchise holder, but reopened seven stores in 2019.
Potato Corner	French fries	1992		
Red Ribbon Bakeshop	Bakery	1979	Jollibee Foods Corporation	
S&R New York Style Pizza	Casual dining	2006		
Samgyupsalamat	Korean barbeque	2012		Unlimited K-BBQ chain
Serenitea	Milk Tea chain	2008		
Shake Shack	Fast food	2019	SSI Group Inc.	American fast casual restaurant chain based in New York City. Opened its first branch in the Philippines on May 10, 2019, in Bonifacio High Street, Bonifacio Global City.
Shakey's Pizza	Casual dining	1975		First pizza chain in the United States. It began in the country under the ownership of San Miguel Corporation.
Shawarma Shack	Shawarma	2015		
Sizzlin' Steak	Casual dining		Max's Group	
Starbucks	Coffee chain	1997	Rustan Coffee Corporation	Opened its first store in the Philippines at Ayala Avenue in December 1997
Taco Bell	Fast food		Philippine Pizza, Inc.	
Teriyaki Boy	Casual dining	2001	Max's Group	
Tokyo Tokyo	Fast food	1985	RAMCAR Food Group, One Food Group	
Tropical Hut	Fast food	1962	Mercury Group of Companies	
Tsurumaru Udon X Tempura	Fast food	2019	Cabalen Group of Restaurants	Japanese fast food restaurant owned by Fujio Foods System (FFS) Co., Ltd., Inc.
Vikings	Buffet	2011		
Wendy's	Fast food	1983	Manny Pangilinan	
Wild Flour Restaurant	Casual dining	2012	Wildflour Hospitality Group	
Wolfgang's Steakhouse	Steakhouse	2016	Excello Restaurant Management Group	
Yellow Cab Pizza	Fast food	2001	Max's Group	

== Former chains ==
- A&W Restaurants - defunct in 2004
- Burger Machine – now a food stall chain
- Cindy's - established Tarlac 1972, fastfood chain defunct by 2000s
- Go Nuts Donuts - defunct in 2020
- IHOP - introduced 2014, local branches closed in 2022
- Manong Pepe's - Jollibee Food Corporation venture into low cost carinderia style fast food. First store opened in 2007 and all stores closed down in 2011
- Teddy's Bigger Burgers

== See also ==
- List of Filipino restaurants
