= 1991 in Philippine television =

The following is a list of events affecting Philippine television in 1991. Events listed include television show debuts, finales, cancellations, and channel launches, closures, and rebrandings, as well as information about controversies and carriage disputes.

== Events ==
- May 15 – ABS-CBN launches Maalaala Mo Kaya.
- June 12 - Coverage of the 1991 eruption of Mount Pinatubo is aired on all television stations, ABS-CBN's coverage promotes DOMSAT simulcasts to millions nationwide.
- August 24 - Regal Rejoicing at 18 commemorates Regal Films' 18th anniversary in the movie production industry.
- August 28 - Radio Mindanao Network's first television station, DXHB-TV Channel 8 in Cagayan de Oro, begins regular broadcasts to viewers in this city.
- November 24 – December 8: ABS-CBN, PTV, New Vision 9 and Islands TV 13 broadcasts nationwide the live events of the 1991 Southeast Asian Games.

== Premieres ==
| Date | Show |
|---|---|
| January 16 | Abangan ang Susunod Na Kabanata on ABS-CBN 2 |
| February 11 | Kape at Balita on GMA 7 |
| February 18 | Teysi ng Tahanan on ABS-CBN 2 |
| May 2 | Islands Newsbreak on Islands TV 13 |
| May 15 | Maalaala Mo Kaya on ABS-CBN 2 |
| June 13 | Computer Kid on Islands TV 13 |
| October 9 | Bahay at Buhay on Islands TV 13 |
| October 18 | Oras ng Katotohanan on Islands TV 13 |
| October 19 | Himig at Sayaw on PTV 4 |

=== Unknown ===
- Isabel, Sugo ng Birhen on ABS-CBN 2
- Ready, Get Set, Go! on ABS-CBN 2
- Business and Leisure on ABS-CBN 2
- Options on ABS-CBN 2
- Batibot on ABS-CBN 2
- Eh Kasi Bata! on ABS-CBN 2
- Ikaw ang Humatol on Islands TV 13
- No Nonsense! on Islands TV 13
- Bistek on Islands TV 13
- Magic Kamison on Islands TV 13
- Four Da Boys on Islands TV 13
- The Jazz Show on Islands TV 13
- Super Games on Islands TV 13
- The Hour of Truth on Islands TV 13
- Chairman and Friends at Faces on Islands TV 13
- Islands Gamemasters on Islands TV 13
- TVJ: Television's Jesters on Islands TV 13
- R.S.V.P. on GMA 7
- Face to Face on GMA 7
- Yan si Mommy on GMA 7
- Bhoy on PTV 4
- Concert at the Park on PTV 4
- Pack Park Presents on PTV 4
- Business Class on New Vision 9
- Cebu on New Vision 9
- Davao: Ang Gintong Pag-Asa on New Vision 9
- Purungtong on New Vision 9
- Ready na Direk! on New Vision 9
- Sports Review on New Vision 9
- Hour of Truth with Rev. Apollo C. Quiboloy on Islands TV 13
- Ewoks on ABS-CBN 2
- Captain N: The Game Master on ABS-CBN 2
- Beverly Hills, 90210 on ABS-CBN 2
- Over My Dead Body on ABS-CBN 2
- Jiraiya on ABS-CBN 2
- Koseidon on ABS-CBN 2

== Returning or renamed programs ==
| Show | Last aired | Retitled as/Season/Notes | Channel | Return date |
|---|---|---|---|---|
| Philippine Basketball League | 1990 (PTV; season 8: "Philippine Cup") | Same (season 9: "Maharlika Cup") | Islands TV 13 | February 9 |
| Philippine Basketball Association | 1990 (season 16: "Third Conference") | Same (season 17: "First Conference") | PTV | February 17 |
| Philippine Basketball League | 1991 (season 9: "Maharlika Cup") | Same (season 9: "Challenge Cup") | Islands TV 13 | May 18 |
| Philippine Basketball Association | 1991 (season 17: "First Conference") | Same (season 17: "All-Filipino Conference") | PTV | June 10 |
| University Athletic Association of the Philippines | 1991 | Same (season 54) | New Vision 9 | July 20 |
| National Collegiate Athletic Association | 1991 (PTV) | Same (season 67) | Islands TV 13 | August 3 |
| Philippine Basketball Association | 1991 (season 17: "All-Filipino Conference") | Same (season 17: "Third Conference") | PTV | September 15 |
| National Basketball Association | 1991 | Same (1991–92 season) | GMA | November |
| Philippine Basketball League | 1991 (season 9: "Challenge Cup") | Same (season 10: "Philippine Cup") | Islands TV 13 | December 7 |

== Programs transferring networks ==
| Date | Show | No. of seasons | Moved from | Moved to |
|---|---|---|---|---|
| February 9 | Philippine Basketball League | 9 | PTV | Islands TV 13 |
| August 3 | National Collegiate Athletic Association | 67 | PTV | Islands TV 13 |
| Unknown | Batibot | —N/a | New Vision 9 / PTV | ABS-CBN |
| Unknown | Concert at the Park | —N/a | GMA | PTV |

== Finales ==
- May 3:
  - Ang Manok ni San Pedro on Islands TV 13
  - Ula ang Batang Gubat on Islands TV 13

=== Unknown ===
- Chika Chika Chicks on ABS-CBN 2
- Discovery Drama Theater on ABS-CBN 2
- Small Brothers on ABS-CBN 2
- Tonight with Dick and Carmi on ABS-CBN 2
- It Bulingit on ABS-CBN 2
- Bahay Kalinga on ABS-CBN 2
- Agring-Agri on Islands TV 13
- 24 Oras on Islands TV 13
- Regal Shocker on Islands TV 13
- Seiko TV Presents on Islands TV 13
- Computer Man on Islands TV 13
- Computer Kid on Islands TV 13
- Magic Kamison on Islands TV 13
- Mongolian Barbecue on Islands TV 13
- Chairman and Friends at Faces on Islands TV 13
- The Jazz Show on Islands TV 13
- Super Games on Islands TV 13
- Takeshi's Castle on Islands TV 13
- Try God on Islands TV 13
- Cine Pinoy on Islands TV 13
- Concert at the Park on GMA 7
- The Penthouse Party on GMA 7
- Pandakekoks on GMA 7
- Good Morning Showbiz on GMA 7
- On the Spot on GMA 7
- Family 3 + 1 on GMA 7
- Shaider on ABS-CBN 2
- Yamara! A Fashionable Judo Girl on GMA 7
- Kiterestu on ABS-CBN 2
- The Bugs Bunny Show on ABS-CBN 2
- Family Ties on ABS-CBN 2
- Over My Dead Body on ABS-CBN 2
- Perfect Strangers on ABS-CBN 2
- Spielban on Islands TV 13
- Metalders on ABS-CBN 2
- Juspion on GMA 7
- Batibot on PTV 4
- Love Me Doods on PTV 4
- Batibot on New Vision 9
- Dear Manilyn on New Vision 9
- Hoy! on New Vision 9
- Isyung Pinoy on New Vision 9
- Starzan on New Vision 9

== Births ==
- February 11 - Lovi Poe, actress
- February 21 - Almira Francisco, actress, singer and TV Host
- February 27 - Errol Abalayan, actor
- March 18 - Rowell Capino, actor, dancer and TV Host
- March 21 - Maichel Fideles, actor, dancer and TV Host
- May 3 - Bela Padilla, actress
- May 15 - Gerald Santos, Filipino actor and singer
- May 17 - Elle Ramirez, actress
- May 28 - Beauty Gonzalez, actress and model
- June 16 - Ryan Bang, actor and comedian
- June 22 - Michael Jim Polancos, comedian
- July 1 - Kim Molina, actress
- July 19 - Arny Ross, actress
- August 13 – Kazel Kinouchi, actress
- August 19 - Nathan Lopez, actor
- August 26 –
  - Wil Dasovich, model and vlogger
  - Miguel Estenzo, actor
- August 26 - Haley Dasovich, model and vlogger
- September 6 - Klarisse de Guzman, singer
- September 26 – Angelo Pasco, actor
- September 27 - Ynna Asistio, actress
- November 25 - Martin del Rosario, actor
- December 4 - Phoebe Walker, actress and model
- December 29 - Tin Patrimonio, Tennis player and model

== See also ==
- 1991 in television
