= S. crispa =

S. crispa may refer to:

- Saussurea crispa, a snow lotus species in the genus Saussurea
- Schomburgkia crispa, a large sized, hot growing plant species
- Sophronitis crispa, an orchid species
- Sparassis crispa, a mushroom species
- Stellaria crispa, a chickweed species

== See also ==
- Crispa (disambiguation)
