= 1993 UST Growling Tigers basketball team =

Basketball team in 1993

1993 UST Growling Tigers men's basketball

UAAP Season 56 champions

Record
- Elims rank: #1
- Final rank: #1
- 1993 record: Automatic champions (14–0 elims)
- Head coach: Aric del Rosario (7th season)
- Assistant coaches: Boy Ascue; Binky Favis
- Captain: Patrick Fran (5th season)

The 1993 UST Growling Tigers men's basketball team represented University of Santo Tomas in the 56th season of the University Athletic Association of the Philippines. The men's basketball tournament for the school year 1993–94 began on July 17, 1993, and the host school for the season was Far Eastern University.

The Tigers went undefeated with a 14–0 record, in the year that was supposedly the first time that the Final Four semifinal playoff format was to take place in the UAAP tournament. Existing league rules stipulated that a team that wins all their games in the double round-robin eliminations is declared automatic champion, making UST the winners for the first time since their shared championship with the UE Red Warriors in 1967.

They had an average winning margin of 15.8 points with five blowout wins over the Ateneo Blue Eagles, the NU Bulldogs, and the UP Fighting Maroons. UST won twice over Ateneo by 27 and 28 points in each elimination rounds. They also defeated NU in both rounds with deficits of 31 and 27 points, and had a 32-point lead in their win against UP in the second round.

Dennis Espino was named Season MVP, and together with Rey Evangelista and team captain Patrick Fran, they were selected to the Mythical first team. Udoy Belmonte was included in the second team.

== Roster ==
UST Growling Tigers roster
Players
Coaches

Pos.	No.	Nat.	Name	Height	Year	High School
SF	4	(Philippines)	Francisco Guinto	6'3" (1.91m)	1st	–
PF	5	(Philippines)	Edmund Reyes	6'3" (1.91m)	4th	Good Shepherd Academy
SG	6	(Philippines)	Lester Andrew del Rosario	5'11" (1.8m)	2nd	University of Santo Tomas
PF	7	(Philippines)	Reynaldo Evangelista	6'4" (1.93m)	5th	St. Peter’s College of Ormoc
SG	8	(Philippines)	Patrick Roy Fran (C)	6'0" (1.83m)	5th	Aquinas School
SG	9	(Philippines)	Rudolf Belmonte	5'11" (1.8m)	5th	San Beda College
SF	10	(Philippines)	Alexander Tan	6'2" (1.88m)	2nd	–
PG	11	(Philippines)	Bal David, Jr.	5'9" (1.75m)	2nd	University of Santo Tomas
SG	13	(Philippines)	Danilo Abugan	6'1" (1.85m)	2nd	–
PG	14	(Philippines)	Bethune Tanquingcen	5'9" (1.75m)	4th	Philippine Cultural High School
C	15	(Philippines)	Christopher Cantonjos	6'6" (1.98m)	1st	Colegio de San Juan de Letran
C	16	(Philippines)	Dennis Espino	6'6" (1.98m)	4th	Holy Angel University
SF	17	(Philippines)	Generoso Tengco, Jr.	6'0" (1.83m)	4th	University of Santo Tomas
PG	18	(Philippines)	Rizaldy Ramos	5'9" (1.75m)	5th	Mapúa Institute of Technology

Head coach

- (Philippines) Januario del Rosario

Assistant coach(es)

- Angel Ascue
- Vincent Kenneth Favis

Team manager

- Benito Lim
- Timmy Koh Teng Chong

Legend

- (C) Team captain
- Injured

- Roster

=== Depth chart ===
Pos.	Starting 5	Bench 1	Bench 2
C	Espino	Cantonjos
PF	Evangelista	Reyes	Tan
SF	Tengco	Guinto	Del Rosario
SG	Belmonte	Fran	Abugan
PG	David	Tanquingcen	Ramos

== Roster changes ==
The Tigers' starting point guard Binky Favis and national team members Rene Cabaluna and Jay Torres have already graduated and are replaced by two rookies, a transferee, and a returning player. UST has managed to recruit point guard Taddy Ramos from the Mapúa Cardinals, the 1991 NCAA champions for a one-and-done season. The 6-6 center Chris Cantonjos, out of the Letran Knights juniors basketball team was scouted by the Tigers' assistant coach Mady Tabora during one of his PBL team's tune-up games. Tabora, who was the coach of the Burger Machine team invited Cantonjos to try out with UST and is now included in this season's lineup.

=== Subtractions ===
Pos.	No.	Nat.	Player	Height	Year	High school	Notes
SG	10	(Philippines)	Romel David	5' 10"	2nd	Mapúa Institute of Technology	Academic deficiencies
PG	18	(Philippines)	Vincent Kenneth Favis	5' 11"	4th	La Salle Greenhills	Graduated
PF		(Philippines)	Joaquin Dindo Torres	6' 4"	5th	University of Santo Tomas	Graduated
PF		(Philippines)	Renato Cabaluna	6' 3"	5th	University of Santo Tomas	Graduated
PF		(Philippines)	Ernesto Ballesteros	6' 4"	2nd	Mapúa Institute of Technology	Academic deficiencies

=== Additions ===
Pos.	No.	Nat.	Player	Height	Year	High school	Notes
SF	4	(Philippines)	Francisco Guinto	6' 3"	1st		Rookie
SG	13	(Philippines)	Danilo Abugan	6' 1"	2nd		Returning from Season 54
C	15	(Philippines)	Christopher Cantonjos	6' 6"	1st	Colegio de San Juan de Letran	Rookie
PG	18	(Philippines)	Rizaldy Ramos	5' 9"	5th	Mapúa Institute of Technology	Transferred from Mapúa Institute of Technology

== Coaching staff ==
Assistant coach and team trainer Mady Tabora died from a heart attack in the offseason while on vacation in his hometown in Cebu City. The former Glowing Goldie who was also the head coach of UST's high school basketball team was replaced by the recently graduated Binky Favis as Aric del Rosario's deputy.

== Schedule and results ==
=== Preseason tournaments ===
Preseason game log

1993 Philippine Commercial Basketball League–Invitational Tournament: 5–1
Game	Date • Time	Opponent	Result	Record	High points	High rebounds	High assists	Location
1	Apr 13	San Sebastian Stags	W 97–87	1–0	Belmonte (39)			Malolos Gym; Bulacan
2	Apr 16	Merville	W 68–67	2–0	Fran (17)			FEU Gym; Manila
3	Apr 17	San Juan	L 63–71	2–1	Simolde (11)			La Salle Gym; Mandaluyong
4	Apr 22	Don Bosco Tondo	W 92–61	3–1	Del Rosario (20)			FEU Gym; Manila
5	May 18	De La Salle Green Archers	W 79–59	4–1	Fran (17)			UST Gym; Manila
6	May 21	FEU Tamaraws	W 89–69	5–1				La Salle Gym; Mandaluyong

1993 FCBL Senior Invitational: 2–3
Game	Date • Time	Opponent	Result	Record	High points	High rebounds	High assists	Location
1	May 13	Letran Knights	L 74–77	0–1	Cantonjos (15)			Arellano Legarda Gym Manila
2	May 16	De La Salle Green Archers	W 65–56	1–1	Evangelista (17)			Arellano Legarda Gym Manila
3	May 18	San Beda Red Lions	L 66–73	1–2	Espino (23)			Arellano Legarda Gym Manila
4	May 23	Mapúa Cardinals	L 71–79	1–3	Fran (20)			Arellano Legarda Gym Manila
5	May 25	Letran Knights	W 90–87	2–3	Fran (20)			Arellano Legarda Gym Manila

(#) Tournament seedings in parentheses.
All times are in UTC+08:00.

=== UAAP games ===
Elimination games were played in a double round-robin format. All games were aired on RPN 9 by Silverstar Sports.

UAAP Season 56 game log

Elimination round: 14–0
Game	Date • Time	Opponent	Result	Record	High points	High rebounds	High assists	Location
1	Jul 17 • 3:00 pm	Ateneo Blue Eagles	W 93–66	1–0	Espino (21)	Belmonte (8)		Araneta Coliseum; Quezon City
2	Jul 24	De La Salle Green Archers	W 80–70	2–0	Belmonte (29)	Espino (11)		Loyola Center; Quezon City
3	Jul 27	NU Bulldogs	W 107–76	3–0				Loyola Center; Quezon City
4	Jul 31	Adamson Soaring Falcons	W 85–78	4–0	Espino (27)	Reyes		Loyola Center; Quezon City
5	Aug 7	FEU Tamaraws	W 78–66	5–0				Loyola Center; Quezon City
6	Aug 10	UP Fighting Maroons	W 87–76	6–0				Loyola Center; Quezon City
7	Aug 14	UE Red Warriors; End of R1 of eliminations	W 82–77	7–0				Loyola Center; Quezon City
8	Aug 22	NU Bulldogs	W 99–72	8–0	Espino (24)			Loyola Center; Quezon City
9	Aug 25	UE Red Warriors	W 73–68	9–0				Loyola Center; Quezon City
10	Aug 29	UP Fighting Maroons	W 93–61	10–0				Loyola Center; Quezon City
11	Sep 1	Ateneo Blue Eagles	W 113–85	11–0				Loyola Center; Quezon City
12	Sep 4 • 5:30 pm	FEU Tamaraws	W 66–58	12–0	Fran (13)			Loyola Center; Quezon City
13	Sep 11 • 3:15 pm	De La Salle Green Archers	W 95–84	13–0	Espino (22)			Loyola Center; Quezon City
14	Sep 18	Adamson Falcons; End of R2 of eliminations	W 75–68	14–0	Belmonte (23)			Araneta Coliseum; Quezon City

(#) Tournament seedings in parentheses.
All times are in UTC+08:00.
Source: SPIN.ph

=== Postseason tournament ===
Postseason game log

1994 UAAP Invitational Cup: 3–2
Game	Date • Time	Opponent	Result	Record	High points	High rebounds	High assists	Location
1	Jan 22 • 12:00 pm	De La Salle Green Archers	W 68–57	1–0	Reyes (18)			Loyola Center; Quezon City
2	Jan 23 • 4:30 pm	FEU Tamaraws	L 66–71	1–1	Reyes (22)			Loyola Center; Quezon City
3	Jan 26 • 3:00 pm	Ateneo Blue Eagles	W 66–47	2–1	Tan (13)			Loyola Center; Quezon City
4	Jan 29 • 3:00 pm	Adamson Soaring Falcons	L 72–73	2–2	R. David (20)			Loyola Center; Quezon City
5	Jan 30 • 3:00 pm	NU Bulldogs	W 80–70	3–2	Tied (15)			Loyola Center; Quezon City

(#) Tournament seedings in parentheses.
All times are in UTC+08:00.

== Awards ==
Name	Award	Date	Ref.
Team	UAAP champions	18 Sep 1993	
Dennis Espino	Season MVP	18 Sep 1993	
Dennis Espino	Mythical first team	18 Sep 1993	
Rey Evangelista	Mythical first team	18 Sep 1993	
Patrick Fran	Mythical first team	18 Sep 1993	
Rudolf Belmonte	Mythical second team	18 Sep 1993	

== Players drafted into the PBA ==
Rey Evangelista was chosen second overall in the 1994 PBA draft by the Chot Reyes-led Coney Island Ice Cream Stars team on January 16, 1994. Udoy Belmonte also got selected in the same rookie draft and was picked 16th overall in the second round by the Yeng Guiao-coached Swift Mighty Meaties team. Patrick Fran and Siot Tanquingcen, meanwhile applied for the 1996 PBA draft on January 21, 1996, with Fran getting picked in the second round by the Purefoods TJ Hotdogs and Tanquingcen going undrafted. The Sunkist Orange Bottlers, however, signed Tanquingcen late in the 1996 PBA season to a one-month contract to replace the injured Boybits Victoria.

Year	Round	Pick	Overall	Player	PBA team
1994	1	2	2	Rey Evangelista	Coney Island Ice Cream Stars
1994	2	8	16	Rudolf Belmonte	Swift Mighty Meaties
1996	2	2	10	Patrick Fran	Purefoods TJ Hotdogs
1996	Signed as a rookie free agent			Siot Tanquingcen	Sunkist Orange Bottlers
