= Crispa =

Crispa may refer to:

- Crispa (elm cultivar), a slow-growing tree
- Crispa, a clothing brand
- Crispa Redmanizers, a basketball team
- Crispa 400, a basketball team
- Crispa, a peppermint cultivar
- Margery Ruth Crisp, a cryptic crossword setter

CRISPA may refer to:

- University of Warsaw Library#Crispa

== See also ==
- CRISPR (Clustered regularly interspaced short palindromic repeats), segments of prokaryotic DNA
