= Max's Restaurant =

Philippine restaurant chain

- Product type: Restaurant chain
- Current owner: Max's Group
- Country: Philippines
- Introduced: October 1945; 81 years ago
- Markets: Philippines, Middle East, North America
- Website: www.maxschicken.com
- Founders: Maximo Gimenez; Mercedes Gimenez; Ruby Trota; Claro Trota; Felipa Sanvictores
- Headquarters: Makati, Metro Manila, Philippines

Max's Restaurant, sometimes known as Max's of Manila or simply Max's (locally [ˈmaksɪs, -sɛs]), is a Philippine-based multinational restaurant chain which serves their founding fried chicken recipe along with other Filipino dishes. It is owned and operated by the Max's Group.

== History ==
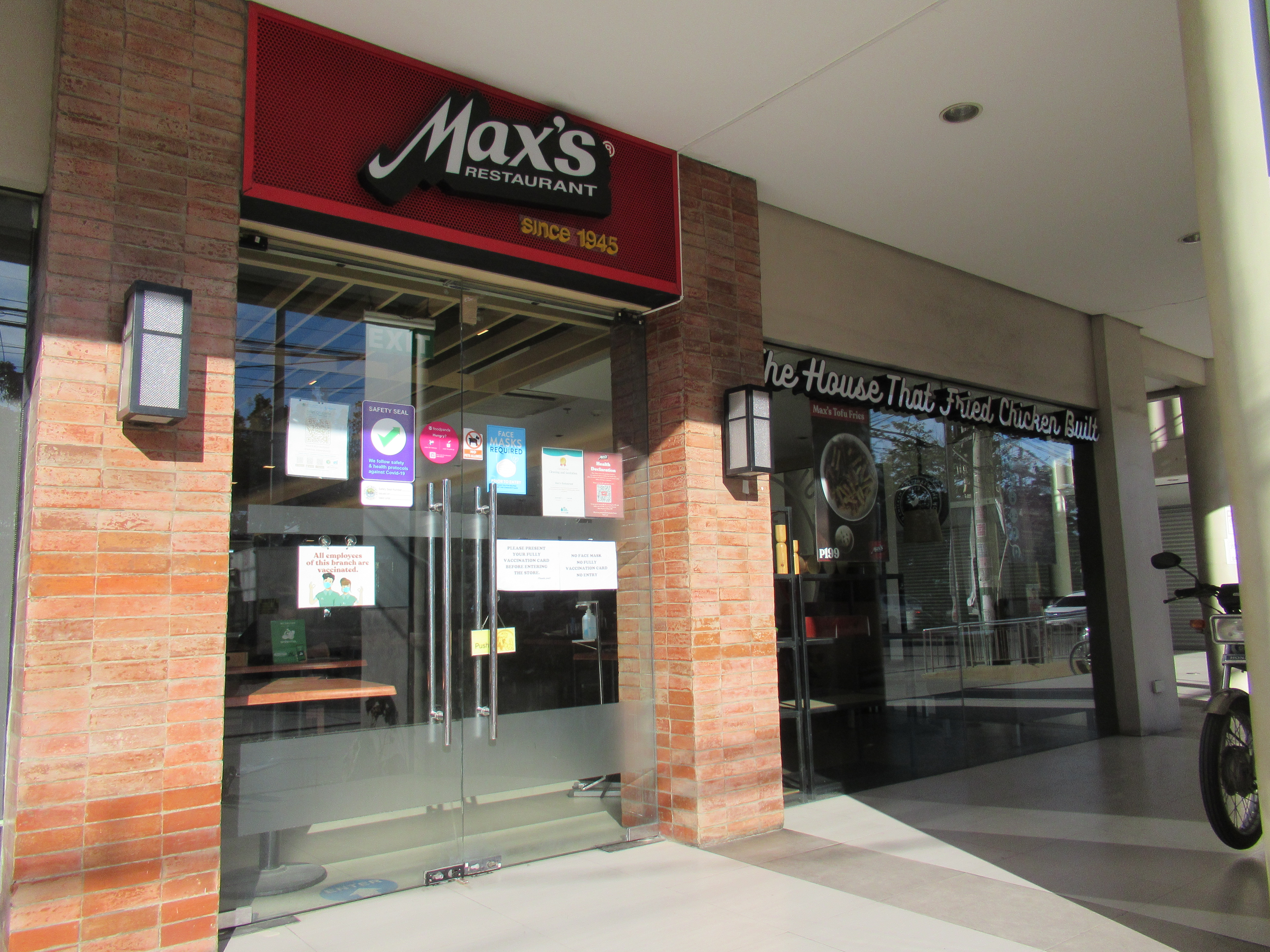
Max's Restaurant in Malolos, Bulacan

Max's Restaurant was first established in October 1945, shortly after World War II, by Maximo Gimenez, a Stanford-educated teacher. Gimenez befriended the American occupation troops stationed in Quezon City, who regularly paid visits to Maximo's home for drinks; the troops later insisted that they pay for the food and beverages being served, prompting Maximo to open a café where the servicemen could be served meals. It opened its first restaurant at 21 South F Street (now Scout Tuason), Barrio Obrero (now Barangay Laging Handa), Quezon City.

Gimenez decided to open a café which initially consisted of chicken, steak and drinks. He was joined by his wife Mercedes, sister-in-law Felipa Serrano Sanvictores, his niece Ruby Trota who managed the kitchen, and her husband Claro. Ruby managed the kitchen and created a chicken recipe which proved to be popular to the G.I.s stationed in the city and later to the public who have heard of Ruby's recipe.

Max's Restaurant later expanded in Metro Manila, Luzon, Cebu and to the United States, Canada, Kuwait and the United Arab Emirates, with plans of opening branches in other countries.

The company that manages Max's Restaurant, Max's Group, also currently operates Pancake House, Dencio's, Kabisera, Teriyaki Boy, Sizzlin' Steak, Le Coeur De France, Maple, Yellow Cab, Singkit, and The Chicken Rice Shop.

== Locations ==
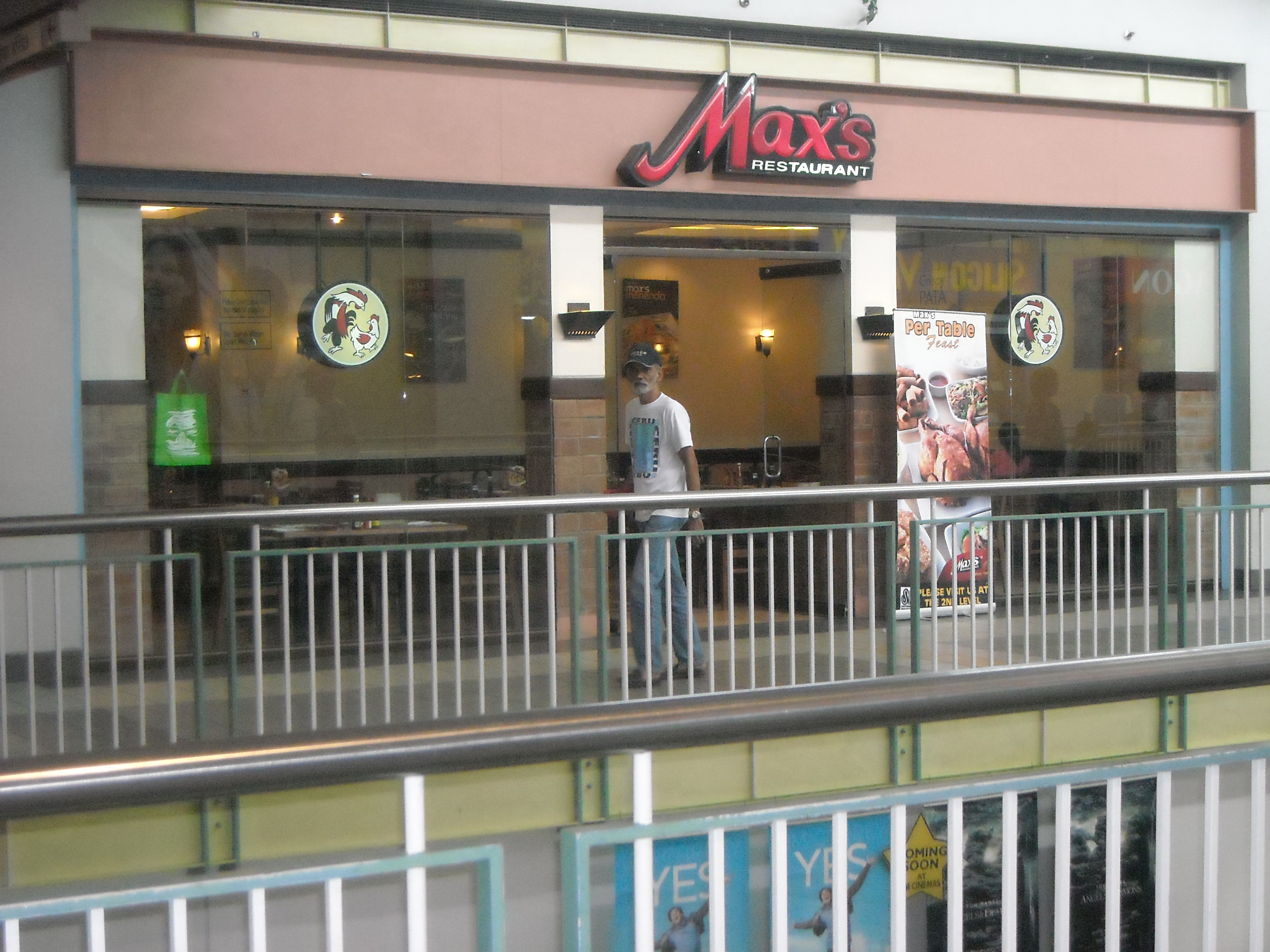
Max's Restaurant at SM City Pampanga

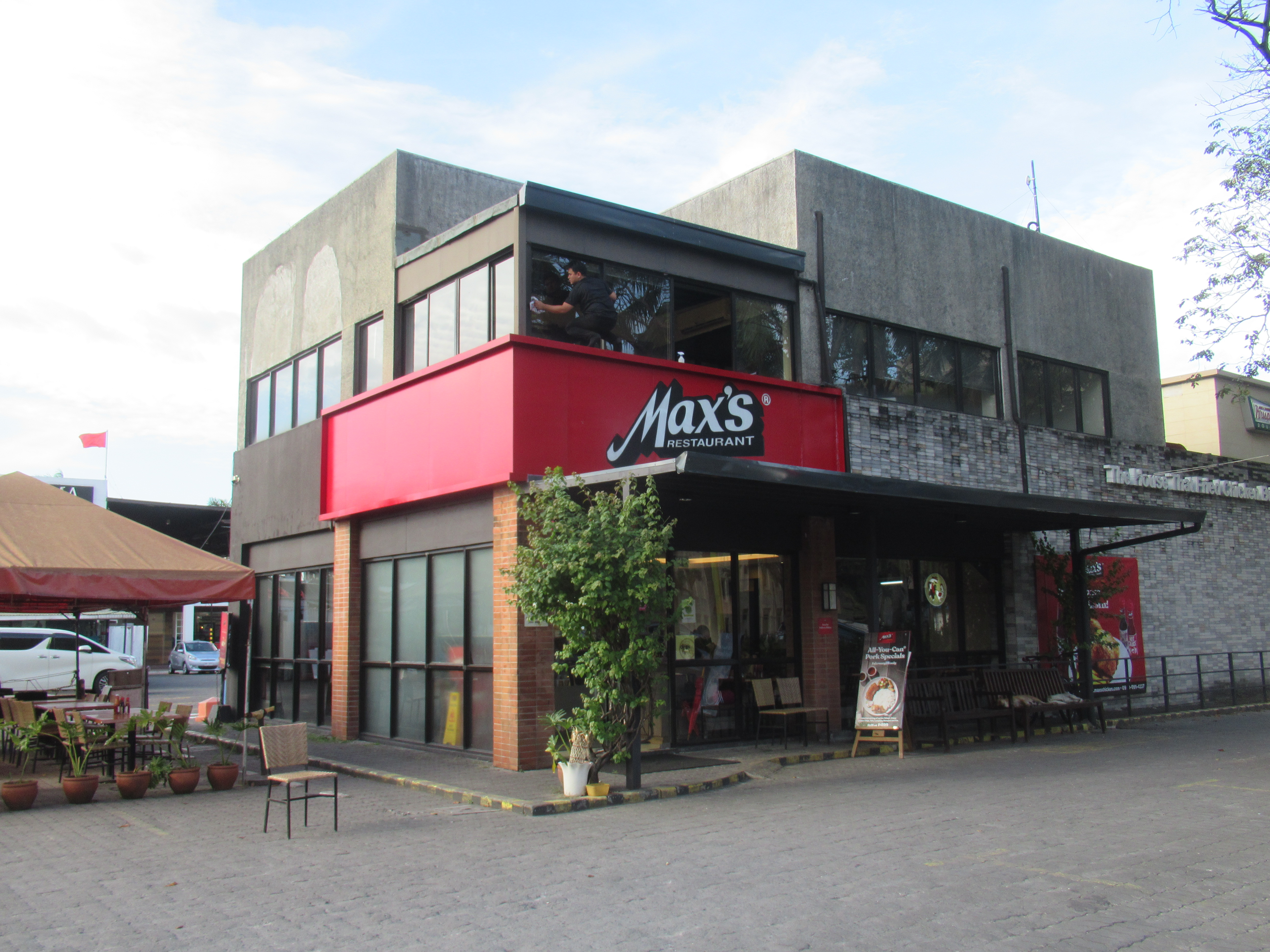
Max's Restaurant in Manila

Max's Restaurant has over 170 branches in the Philippines. The chain also has branches in the U.S. states of California, Hawaii, New Jersey, Nevada, New York, Illinois, Texas and Washington. It has five locations in Canada in Toronto, Ontario, Vancouver, British Columbia, Edmonton, Alberta, Winnipeg, Manitoba, and Calgary, Alberta. In 2016, Max's opened in Salmiya, Kuwait; a new location was opened in Woodside, New York in May 2022.

== Products ==
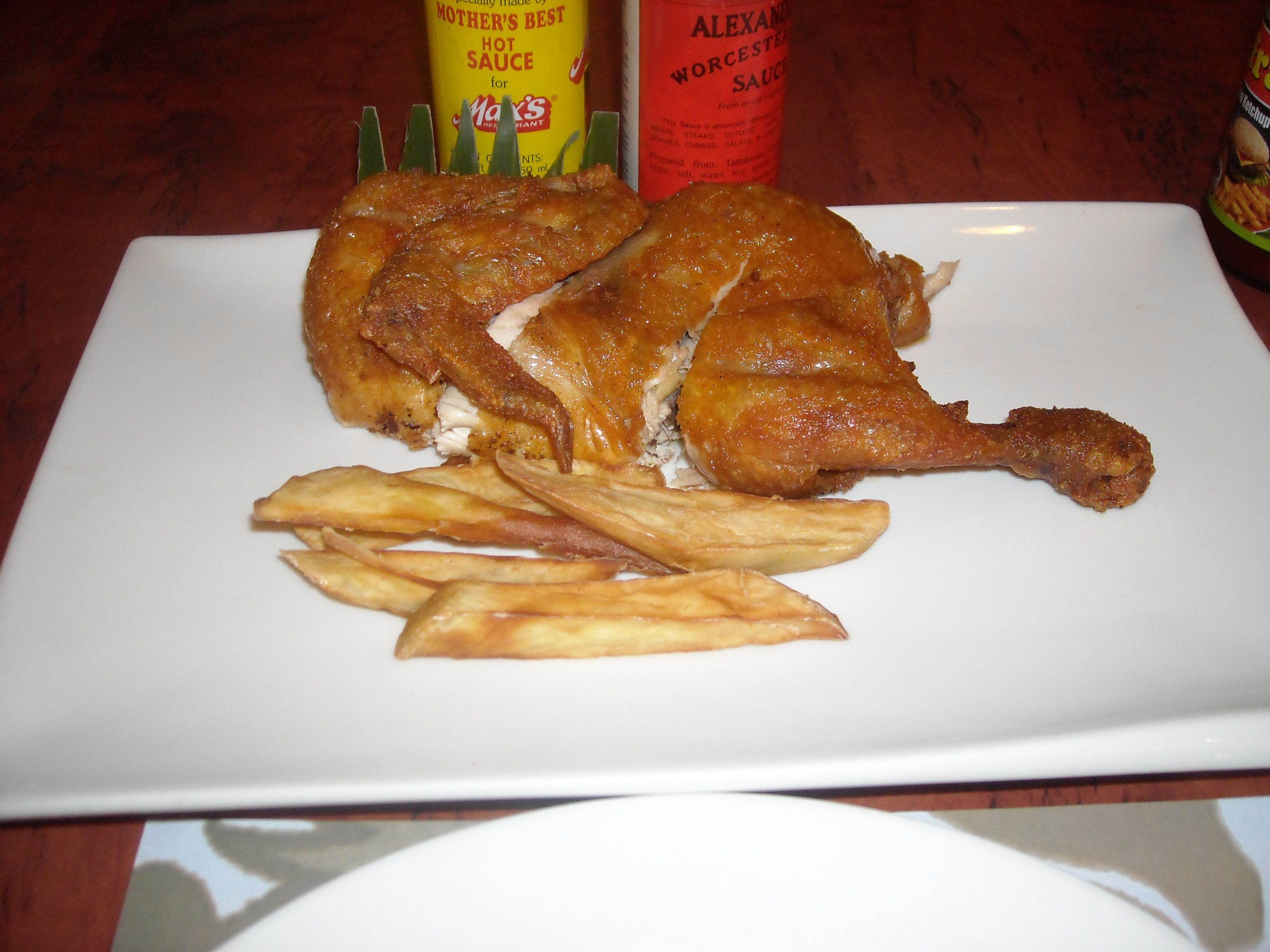
Max fried chicken served with sweet potato fries

The restaurant's signature dish is its fried chicken. Max's Chicken also offers traditional Filipino dishes such as kare-kare, sinigang, lumpia, lechon, pancit, and silog.

== Marketing ==
In earlier television and cinema advertisements, Max's Restaurant usually marketed itself as a place for Filipino families to get together. In 1993, it also established its slogan "Sarap to the bones!" (lit. transl. "Delicious to the bones!").

from April to June 2004, a popular series of television advertisements, entitled "Forever Yours" told the story of a Max's employee who was the childhood love of a popular TV celebrity, played by Piolo Pascual, their endorser from 2002 to 2011. The series showed the two characters as children, then as adults accidentally meeting at Max's. The denouement of the story is when the celebrity recognizes the employee from their childhood. This commercial became so popular that it launched the showbiz career of Isabel Oli, the model who played the employee.

Aside from its advertising, the story of how Max's Restaurant started has entered into popular culture. It was portrayed in the episode "Sino si Max?" (lit. transl. "Who is Max?") of the long-running Filipino drama anthology Maalaala Mo Kaya. Some of their other celebrity endorsers were Gary Valenciano (1996–1999) and Coco Martin (who also worked as a waiter of the restaurant in 2001, at their branch in Fairview; 2012–2014).

== See also ==
- List of fast-food chicken restaurants
- List of Filipino restaurants
- List of Philippine restaurant chains
