= Triple-V Foodmasters =

- Leagues: Philippine Basketball League
- Founded: 1991
- History: Triple-V Foodmasters 1991-1992
- Team colors: White, red
- Head coach: Derrick Pumaren
- Championships: PBL (3): *1991 Challenge Cup; *1991-1992 Philippine Cup; *1992 Invitational Cup

The Triple-V Foodmasters is a former Philippine Basketball League (PBL) team which lasted two years in the premier amateur league from 1991-1992.

== Championships ==
Triple-V won their first PBL title in only their second participated tournament in the import-flavored Challenge Cup, the Foodmasters defeated defending champion Crispa 400, 3 games to 1.

They repeated as back-to-back champions in the following year as they overcame a tough challenge by Sta. Lucia Realtors in winning the Philippine Cup title in a five-game series. They lost to the same Realtors in the championship via sweep in the following conference.

In the last offering of the 1992 PBL season called Invitational Cup, Triple-V drafted three players from the disbanded Crispa White Cement squad, they are Johnny Abarrientos, Felix Duhig and Freddie Abuda, and they took in Michael Mustre from A & W Hamburgers, which also sought a leave of absence from the league. Triple-V won their third title in the last four conferences and scored a similar 3-0 sweep and exact revenge over championship rival Sta.Lucia Realtors.

== Roster list ==
- Johnny Abarrientos
- Dennis Abbatuan
- Freddie Abuda
- Arthur Ayson
- Patrick Belardo
- Ronnie Cahanding
- Edison Cubacub
- Rafael Dinglasan
- Jolly Escobar
- Tonyboy Espinosa
- Noynoy Falcasantos
- Dwight Lago
- Noli Locsin
- Gil Lumberio
- Mike Mustre
- Victor Pablo
- Arnold Polonio
- Django Rivera
- Allen Sasan
- Eddie Viaplana
- Vernie Villarias
- Vic Villarias

== See also ==
- 1991-92 Philippine Basketball League season
