= 1991 in television =

1991 in television may refer to:

- 1991 in American television for television-related events in the United States.
- 1991 in Australian television for television-related events in Australia.
- 1991 in Belgian television for television-related events in Belgium.
- 1991 in Brazilian television for television-related events in Brazil.
- 1991 in British television for television-related events in the United Kingdom.
  - 1991 in Scottish television for television-related events in Scotland.
- 1991 in Canadian television for television-related events in Canada.
- 1991 in Danish television for television-related events in Denmark.
- 1991 in Dutch television for television-related events in the Netherlands.
- 1991 in Estonian television for television-related events in Estonia.
- 1991 in German television for television-related events in Germany.
- 1991 in Irish television for television-related events in the Republic of Ireland.
- 1991 in Italian television for television-related events in Italy.
- 1991 in Japanese television for television-related events in Japan.
- 1991 in New Zealand television for television-related events in New Zealand.
- 1991 in Philippine television for television-related events in the Philippines.
- 1991 in Spanish television for television-related events in Spain.
- 1991 in Swedish television for television-related events in Sweden.
