= NLEX Road Warriors =

Philippine professional basketball team

- 2025–26 NLEX Road Warriors season
- Founded: 2014
- History: NLEX Road Warriors (2014–present)
- Team colors: Blue, orange, neon orange, white
- Company: NLEX Corporation
- Board governor: Ronald Dulatre
- Team manager: Ronald Dulatre
- Head coach: Jimmy Alapag
- Team captain: Robert Bolick
- Ownership: Manuel V. Pangilinan
- Retired numbers: 1 (88)

The NLEX Road Warriors is a professional basketball team owned by NLEX Corporation, a subsidiary of Metro Pacific Investments, playing in the Philippine Basketball Association (PBA) since the 2014–2015 season.

The Road Warriors began in the PBA Developmental League (PBA D-League) as one of its founding teams, winning a total of six championships. The franchise transferred to the PBA after the Manila North Tollways Corporation (a subsidiary of Metro Pacific Investments Corporation) acquired the PBA franchise of the Air21 Express in June 2014. It is one of three PBA teams currently under the control of businessman Manuel V. Pangilinan (the other teams are the TNT Tropang 5G and the Meralco Bolts).

== History ==
=== PBA D-League ===
From 2011 to 2014, the Road Warriors were the dominant team in the PBA D-League, setting a record six championships in the seven conferences that it participated.

=== Getting into the PBA ===
In March 2014, Manila North Tollways Corporation (MNTC) submitted its letter of intent to join the PBA as an expansion team. On April 10, the PBA Board of Governors unanimously approved MNTC's expansion team application together Ever Bilena Cosmetics' Blackwater Elite and Columbian Autocar Corporation's Kia Sorento. All three teams would join the league starting with the 2014–15 season. However, MNTC alongside Even Bilena weren't allowed to carry-over their existing PBA D-League teams due to Columbian not having an existing team in the minor league. This meant that all three expansion teams would have to build their rosters from the ground up via the expansion draft, rookie draft, and free agency.

While Columbian and Ever Bilena have paid their respective franchise fees, MNTC requested for an extension, as they were studying whether to enter the PBA as an expansion team or acquire an existing PBA franchise. On June 17, MNTC announced that it was having negotiations with an undisclosed team to acquire their franchise, a team that they would reveal after their elimination from the 2014 PBA Governors' Cup playoffs. Days later, the team was revealed to be the Air21 Express, owned by the Lina Group of Companies. On June 23, MNTC reached an agreement to acquire the Express from the Lina Group. The sale was approved during the regular monthly meeting of the board of governors, paving the way for the sale of the franchise to MNTC. This also meant that the team won't participate in the expansion draft and instead acquire all of Air21 Express' assets.

=== 2014–2016: Early seasons ===
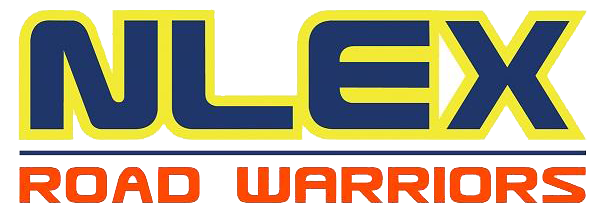
NLEX Road Warriors logo from 2014 to 2017

In their first-ever draft in 2014, NLEX used their fourth pick to select Matt Ganuelas-Rosser from their own PBA D-League team. During the pre-season. the team acquired KG Canaleta from the Talk 'N Text Tropang Texters in exchange for Kevin Alas as part of a larger trade with the Blackwater Elite.

In their first conference, the 2014–15 PBA Philippine Cup, NLEX finished 10th with a 4–7 record, meaning they have to win back-to-back games over twice-to-beat advantage holders Alaska Aces in the first quarterfinal round. The team lost to Alaska in the first game, eliminating NLEX from the playoffs. The team saw improvement in the 2015 PBA Commissioner's Cup. With the help of former NBA player Al Thornton, NLEX improved to fourth in the eliminations with a 6–5 record. They would lose to the Meralco Bolts in two games. However, in the following Governors' Cup, the team finished 11th and failed to make the playoffs.

In the 2015 PBA draft, NLEX used their two first-round picks to select Garvo Lanete and Glenn Khobuntin at sixth and tenth, respectively. During the off-season, the team made a series of trades which saw the Road Warriors acquire Sean Anthony from the Meralco Bolts and two young players in Simon Enciso and the returning Kevin Alas.

NLEX saw better results in their second season, coincidentally finishing 7th with a 5–6 record in all three conferences. Despite that, the team failed to get past the quarterfinals season-long, losing to the TNT Tropang Texters in the Philippine Cup, Meralco in the Commissioner's Cup, and the San Miguel Beermen in the Governors' Cup.

=== 2016–2023: The stars collide ===
==== 2016–2020: The Alas and Quiñahan era begins, Yeng Guiao takes charge ====
Ahead of the 2016–17 season, NLEX took a big step with the hiring of multi-titled coach Yeng Guiao, who joined the team as head coach following a successful stint handling the Rain or Shine Elasto Painters. Guiao also became NLEX's general manager. Despite Guiao's presence, his first two conferences under NLEX were dismal, finishing in 12th place in both the Philippine Cup and Commissioner's Cup. During the Commissioner's Cup, however, the team was part of a four-team trade, which saw J. R. Quiñahan and Larry Fonacier join the Road Warriors while Sean Anthony, Bradwyn Guinto, and Garvo Lanete were traded away to other teams. With their new acquisitions, the team saw a big improvement in the 2016 PBA Governors' Cup, which saw NLEX finish with their best record yet at 7–4. Despite that, the team finished fifth and later lost to twice-to-beat advantage holders Star Hotshots in the first game of the quarterfinals.

NLEX had the second pick of the 2017 PBA draft. The team used this pick to select Ateneo Blue Eagles standout Kiefer Ravena. The Road Warriors continued to show improvement during the 2017–18 PBA Philippine Cup. After finishing sixth in eliminations, the team managed to upset the third-seeded Alaska Aces in a two-game sweep to finally get over the quarterfinals hump and advance to their first-ever semifinals. Despite putting a tough fight, the team eventually lost to the Magnolia Hotshots Pambansang Manok in six games of the best-of-seven series. After falling once more to 11th in the Commissioner's Cup, the team returned to the playoffs in the succeeding Governors' Cup following an eighth-place finish. The team lost to Barangay Ginebra San Miguel in one game. During the season, NLEX also got a taste of international basketball when they, alongside the Blackwater Elite, represented the Philippines in the 2018 Super 8 tournament hosted by the Asia League (now known as the East Asia Super League) in Macau.

NLEX were once again in possession of two first-round draft picks during the 2018 PBA draft. They first selected Paul Desiderio with the fourth pick followed Abu Tratter with the seventh pick. However, the team ended up trading both players to Blackwater as part of a three-team trade in which the Road Warriors got Poy Erram from Blackwater and Philip Paredes from the TNT KaTropa. The first two conferences did not turn out well for NLEX, starting with a ninth-place finish in the Philippine Cup where they lost in the eighth-seed playoff to Alaska while in the Commissioner's Cup, they found themselves in dead last once more after recording just two wins. But in the Governors' Cup, NLEX turned their poor performances around in a big way. The team finished at the top of the elimination round table with an 8–3 record, giving the team twice-to-beat advantage against their quarterfinals opponent, the NorthPort Batang Pier. Unfortunately, NLEX suffered a major upset as NorthPort beat them in two back-to-back games, including a triple-overtime thriller in game 2, to eliminate the Road Warriors out of the playoffs.

During the 2019 PBA draft, the team first selected Matt Nieto with the third pick of the special round before proceeding to select Mike Ayonayon with the third pick of the regular draft. In the 2020 PBA season, and in conjunction, the 2020 PBA Philippine Cup, NLEX finished in 9th, failing to re-enter the playoffs.

==== 2021–2023: Young talent steps in and Yeng Guiao's departure ====
During the PBA season 46 draft, NLEX selected Tzaddy Rangel with the third pick of the special draft before selecting Calvin Oftana third overall in the regular draft. During the off-season, the team also made a trade with the Blackwater Bossing which saw them land Don Trollano. In the 2021 PBA Philippine Cup, the team finished 7th and were eliminated by advantage holders Meralco Bolts in two games. The following Governors' Cup saw NLEX rise in the standings. Despite losing Kiefer Ravena, who was released by the team to allow him to play in the Japanese B.League, with the help of the team's imports in K. J. McDaniels and Cameron Clark during the later part of the conference, NLEX finished 2nd in the elimination round with an 8–3 record. In the quarterfinals, the Road Warriors eliminated the Alaska Aces in what ended up being the last hurrah for the latter team. The team advanced to the semifinals for the first time since 2018 when they fell to Barangay Ginebra San Miguel.

For the PBA season 47 draft, NLEX selected Tyrus Hill with the seventh overall pick, but then traded him just two days later alongside David Murrell to the newly established Converge FiberXers for their first-round pick in season 48 (2023). The team finished 6th in the 2022 PBA Philippine Cup, where they lost to the Magnolia Chicken Timplados Hotshots in three games of the best-of-three series. After this conference, on September 2, 2022, Yeng Guiao left the Road Warriors after failing to come to terms with a contract extension. He would end up reuniting with the Rain or Shine Elasto Painters.

The start of the post-Guiao era saw a major three-team trade which saw Calvin Oftana and Raul Soyud moving to the TNT Tropang Giga, and in return, NLEX acquired Brandon Ganuelas-Rosser from the Blackwater Bossing. In the 2022–23 PBA Commissioner's Cup, the team's first conference without Guiao, the team finished 9th with a 5–7 record, and coincidentally ended up tied with the 8th-place Guiao-led lasto Painters in the eighth-seed playoff. NLEX weren't able to beat their former head coach in the playoff game and didn't make the quarterfinals. Ahead of the Governors' Cup, NLEX was part of another three-team trade, this time sending Justin Chua and Paul Varilla to TNT, and from the Phoenix Super LPG Fuel Masters, brought Jake Pascual to the team as well as a familiar face in Sean Anthony. Alongside their foreign reinforcements, Jonathon Simmons and later Wayne Selden Jr., team saw improvement in the Governors' Cup, going back to the 6th position with a 6–5 record. The Road Warriors lost the Bolts in a quarterfinals sweep.

In the PBA season 48 draft, NLEX selected Richie Rodger with the seventh pick. In free agency, NLEX signed Robbie Herndon, originally from the San Miguel Beermen, and re-signed Kevin Alas. However, J. R. Quiñahan had his contract in NLEX after being involved in a brawl during an exhibition game he took part in without the team's approval.

=== 2023–present: The Robert Bolick and Kevin Alas era ===
During the 2023–24 PBA Commissioner's Cup, NLEX were once again part of a three-team trade, which sent Don Trollano to the San Miguel Beermen and Kris Rosales to the NorthPort Batang Pier, while the Road Warriors got Robert Bolick as part of the package, whose rights were with NorthPort while he was playing the second division of Japan's B.League. Despite Bolick's arrival, NLEX failed to make the playoffs in the conference. Ahead of the succeeding 2024 PBA Philippine Cup, NLEX engaged in yet another three-team trade, where they sent Brandon Ganuelas-Rosser to the TNT Tropang Giga while also acquiring Ato Ular and veteran Yousef Taha from the Blackwater Bossing. This time around, NLEX did reach the quarterfinals of the Philippine Cup, finishing 6th in eliminations, but were once again swept by the eventual champion Meralco Bolts in two games.

In the PBA season 49 draft, NLEX used their sixth overall pick to select Jonnel Policarpio. After a pair of middling results in the two import-laden conferences, the team once again made a jump in the standings in the 2025 PBA Philippine Cup. With an 8–3 record, the Road Warriors clinched the second seed and twice-to-beat advantage in the playoffs. Unfortunately, the team wasn't able to make use of their advantage, as they lost to the Rain or Shine Elasto Painters in both games.

In the PBA season 50 draft, the team selected Ljay Gonzales with the fifth pick.

== Current roster ==
NLEX Road Warriors roster
Players
Coaches

Pos.	#	POB	Name	Height	Weight	DOB (YYYY–MM–DD)	From
G	0	(Philippines)	Evan Nelle	5 ft 11 in (1.80 m)		1998–06–08	De La Salle
C	2	(Philippines)	Michael Miranda (FA)	6 ft 7 in (2.01 m)	210 lb (95 kg)	1990–12–12	San Sebastian
G	3	(Philippines)	Baser Amer (FA)	6 ft 0 in (1.83 m)	170 lb (77 kg)	1992–09–29	San Beda
C	4	(Philippines)	Lorenz Capulong (R)	6 ft 6 in (1.98 m)		2000–10–27	Arellano
F	5	(Philippines)	Arvin Gamboa (R)	6 ft 4 in (1.93 m)		1997–09–13	Mapúa
F	6	(Philippines)	Enoch Valdez	6 ft 2 in (1.88 m)	178 lb (81 kg)	2000–05–26	Lyceum
G	7	(Philippines)	Kevin Alas	6 ft 0 in (1.83 m)	175 lb (79 kg)	1991–11–13	Letran
G	8	(Philippines)	Robert Bolick	6 ft 1 in (1.85 m)	178 lb (81 kg)	1995–09–13	San Beda
F	9	(Philippines)	Dominick Fajardo	6 ft 0 in (1.83 m)	220 lb (100 kg)	1993–10–25	Bulacan State
G/F	10	(New Zealand)	Richie Rodger	6 ft 2 in (1.88 m)	211 lb (96 kg)	1997–01–27	UE
G/F	11	(United States)	Robbie Herndon (IN)	6 ft 3 in (1.91 m)	180 lb (82 kg)	1993–07–16	San Francisco State
G	12	(Philippines)	Matt Nieto	6 ft 1 in (1.85 m)	160 lb (73 kg)	1997–05–31	Ateneo
G	13	(Philippines)	Ljay Gonzales (R)	5 ft 11 in (1.80 m)		1998–12–19	Far Eastern
G/F	14	(United States)	Schonny Winston	6 ft 4 in (1.93 m)	190 lb (86 kg)	1998–07–22	De La Salle
F/C	15	(Canada)	Brandon Ramirez	6 ft 5 in (1.96 m)		1997–10–29	York
F	16	(Philippines)	Kevin Racal	6 ft 3 in (1.91 m)	175 lb (79 kg)	1991–05–16	Letran
F/C	18	(Philippines)	JB Bahio	6 ft 5 in (1.96 m)		1998–05–23	San Beda
C	20	(Philippines)	Dave Marcelo	6 ft 5 in (1.96 m)	223 lb (101 kg)	1989–02–22	San Beda
F	23	(United States)	Deonte Burton (GI)	6 ft 4 in (1.93 m)	240 lb (109 kg)	1994–01–31	Iowa State
F	33	(Australia)	Anthony Semerad	6 ft 4 in (1.93 m)	230 lb (104 kg)	1991–04–25	San Beda
G	77	(Philippines)	Xyrus Torres	6 ft 0 in (1.83 m)		2000–09–23	Far Eastern

Head coach

- (United States) Jimmy Alapag

Assistant coach(es)

- (Philippines) Borgie Hermida (1st assistant)
- (Philippines) Jong Uichico
- (Philippines) Woody Co
- (Philippines) Anton Escolin
- (Philippines) Melo Lim
- (Philippines) Emman Monfort
- (Philippines) JB Sison
- (Philippines) Adonis Tierra
- (Philippines) Virgil Villavicencio (consultant)

Team manager

- (Philippines) Ronald Dulatre

Legend

- (C) Team captain
- (CI) Commissioner's Cup Import
- (GI) Governors' Cup Import
- (EI) EASL Import
- (DP) Unsigned draft pick
- (FA) Free agent
- (IN) Inactive
- (S) Suspended
- (R) Rookie
- Injured

Roster

== Head coaches ==
Name	Start	End	Seasons	Overall record				Best finish
Name	Start	End	Seasons	W	L	PCT	G	Best finish
Boyet Fernandez	2014	2016	2	28	44	.389	72	Quarterfinals
Yeng Guiao	2016	2022	6	71	96	.425	167	Semifinals
Frankie Lim	2022	2024	2	23	28	.451	51	Quarterfinals
Jong Uichico	2024	2026	2	36	30	.545	66	Quarterfinals

== Season-by-season records ==
List of the last five conferences completed by the NLEX Road Warriors. For the full-season history, see List of NLEX Road Warriors seasons.

Note: GP = Games played, W = Wins, L = Losses, W–L% = Winning percentage

Season	Conference	GP	W	L	W–L%	Finish	Playoffs
2024–25	Governors'	10	5	5	.500	4th (Group B)	Lost in quarterfinals vs. TNT, 1–3
2024–25	Commissioner's	12	6	6	.500	9th	Lost in eighth seed playoff vs. Magnolia, 81–112
2024–25	Philippine	11	8	3	.727	2nd	Lost in quarterfinals vs. Rain or Shine in two games
2025–26	Philippine	11	6	5	.545	8th	Lost in quarterfinals vs. San Miguel**, 94–101
2025–26	Commissioner's	12	10	2	.833	1st	Lost in quarterfinals vs. TNT in two games
An asterisk (*) indicates one-game playoff; two asterisks (**) indicate team with twice-to-beat advantage

== Awards ==
=== Individual awards ===
PBA Mythical First Team
- Robert Bolick (2024-25)
PBA Mythical Second Team
- Sean Anthony (2015-16)
- Asi Taulava (2014-15, 2015-16)
PBA Sportsmanship Award
- Kevin Alas (2021, 2022-23)

=== PBA Press Corps Individual Awards ===
All-Rookie Team
- Calvin Oftana (2021)
- Brandon Ganuelas-Rosser (2022-23)

=== All-Star Weekend ===
All-Star MVP
- Robert Bolick – (2024)
Obstacle Challenge
- Dave Marcelo – (2024)
All - Star Selection

2015

- Asi Taulava

2016

- Asi Taulava

2017

- Rabeh Al-Hussaini
- Alfonzo Gotladera
- Bradwyn Guinto
- Glenn Khobuntin
- Carlo Lastimosa
- Asi Taulava

2018

- Cyrus Baguio
- Emman Monfort
- Kiefer Ravena
- J.R. Quiñahan
- Asi Taulava

2019

- John Paul Erram
- Asi Taulava

2023

- Kevin Alas

2024

- Robert Bolick

2026

- JB Bahio
- Robert Bolick

=== Retired numbers ===
NLEX Road Warriors retired numbers
N°	Player	Position	Tenure
88	Asi Taulava	C	2014–2023 (Note: Jersey number retired during Taulava's final PBA game)

== See also ==
- NLEX Road Warriors draft history
