= Cabalen =

Philippine restaurant chain

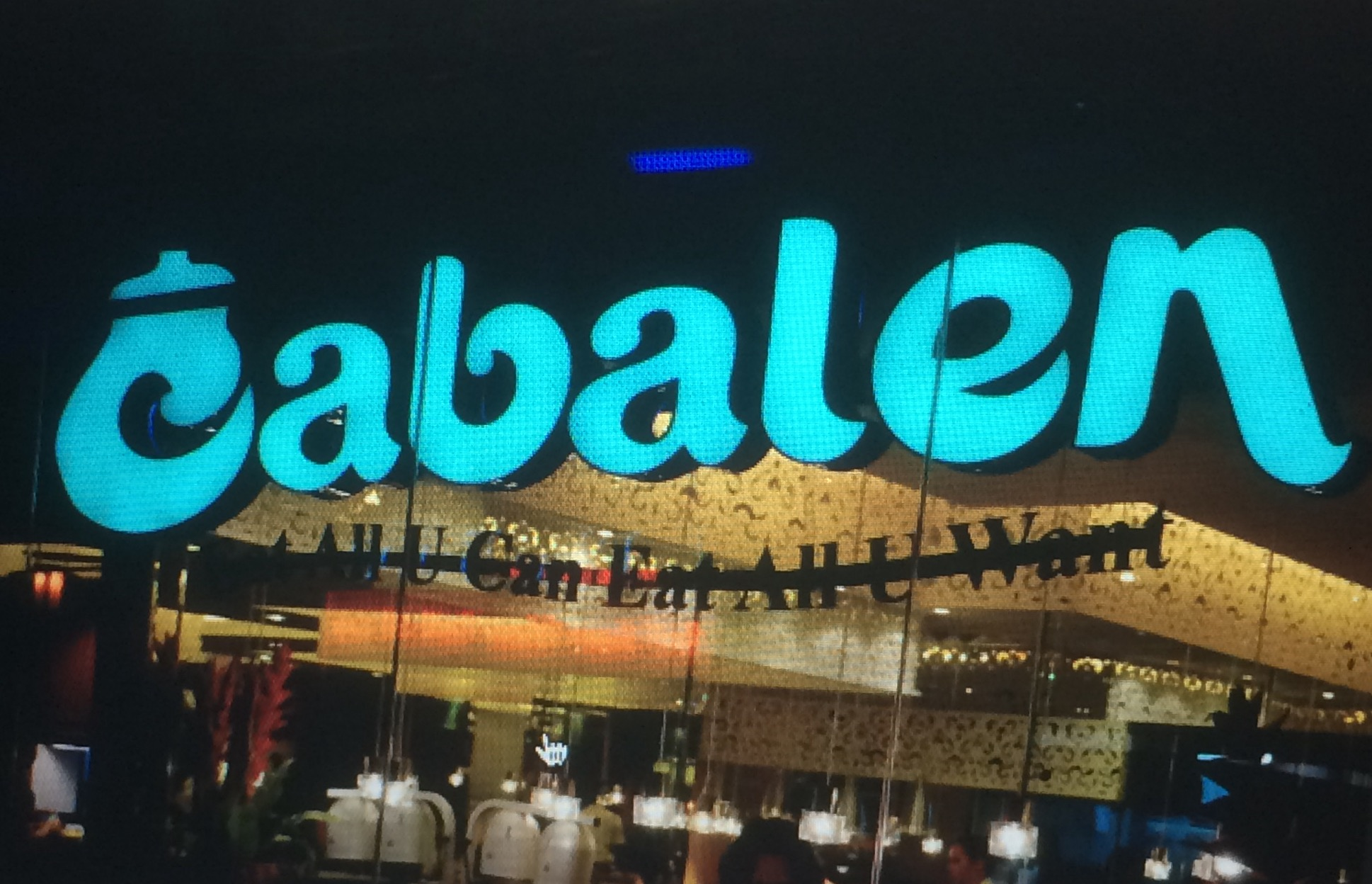
- Company type: Private
- Industry: Restaurant
- Founded: 1986; 40 years ago in Quezon City, Philippines
- Founders: Maritel Nievera
- Headquarters: Quezon City, Philippines
- Number of locations: 37 (36 local, 1 overseas)
- Area served: Philippines (Metro Manila, Luzon, Cebu); United States
- Key people: Maritel Nievera (President)
- Products: Filipino cuisine Asian cuisine
- Website: cabalen.ph/cabalen

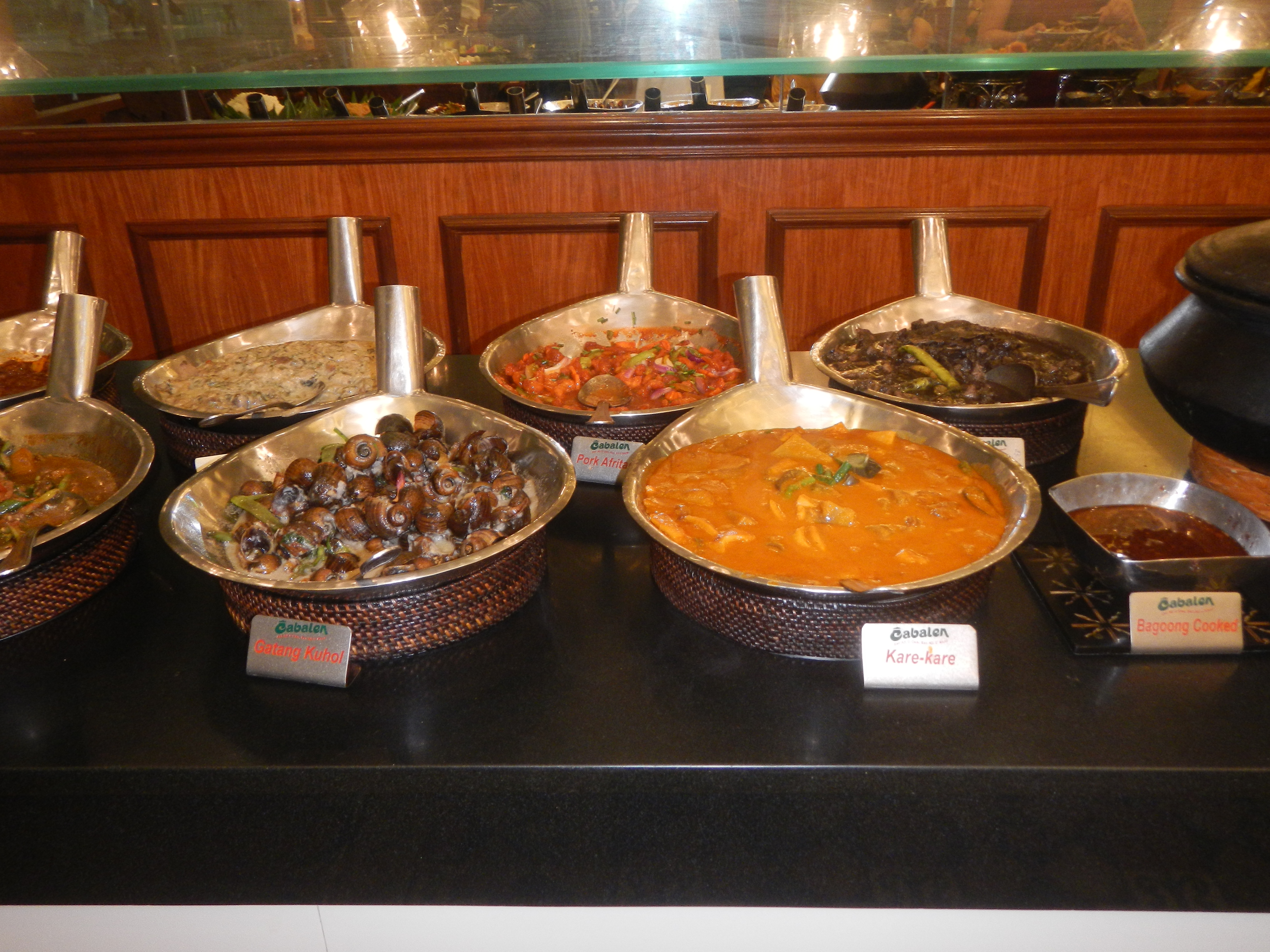
Buffet featuring Gatang Kuhol (snails), Kare-kare and other Filipino delicacies.

Cabalen is a Philippine buffet restaurant chain primarily serving traditional Filipino entrees heavy on influences from the Pampanga region of Central Luzon, as well as dishes from Filipino, Thai, and Japanese cuisines. However, most of the meals are from Kapampangan cuisine. Most of the chain's restaurants are located in Metro Manila, with one restaurant located in Cebu province and a single unit in the United States. Some of the locations are franchised operations. Many locations are situated within shopping malls.

== History ==
Cabalen, which literally translates to "a fellow Kapampangan", is a group of casual - fine dining restaurants known for authentic Kapampangan dishes and different Filipino specialties, originating from Pampanga, such as Gatang Kohol (snails in coconut milk), betuteng tugak (stuffed frog), kamaru (crickets), adobong pugo (quail) and balut (developing bird embryo). These factors contributed to the eventual birth of Cabalen, the Kapampangan specialty restaurants.

Cabalen family started in 1974 in San Fernando, Pampanga as a small Bahay Pasalubong Restaurant selling specialty food dishes, then grew into a restaurant called "Ituro Mo, Iluto Ko". In 1986, the first Cabalen Eat-all-you-Can, Eat-all-you-Want Restaurant was opened on West Avenue in Quezon City that led to the expansion to more outlets.

The first location outside of Luzon was opened in Cebu City on the island of Cebu in August 2009. This location also serves local Cebuano dishes.

In September 2010, Cabalen began to provide the Asian Buffet in addition to the Filipino Buffet at their three largest locations in the shopping malls at Glorietta, TriNoma, and SM Mall of Asia, all located in Metro Manila.

A few famous customers include Gloria M. Arroyo, Joseph Estrada, Panfilo Lacson, Sharon Cuneta, Imelda Marcos, Kris Aquino, Raul Roco, Boots Anson-Roa, Claudine Barretto, and Butz Aquino. Cabalen has also catered to many official functions in locations such as the Malacañang Palace.

== Fare ==
Typical dishes include bopis (lungs), Gatang Kohol (snails in coconut milk), Ensalata Ampalaya (a bitter gourd with garlic and ginger), and laing (a root vegetable in coconut milk). There is also pork, beef, and fish stews, as well as Chinese influenced fried lumpia, pinakbet (vegetables), and adobo (traditional barbeque). Cabalen is also known for purveying delicacies such as betuteng tugak (stuffed frog), kamaru (crickets), adobong pugo (quail) and balut (developing bird embryo).

== Branch locations ==
Cabalen has a total of 17 branches in the Philippines and 1 branch internationally, in the United States. It is not so commonly known that there are two types of Cabalen restaurants, the All-Filipino Buffet (which has 15 locations) and the Asian Buffet (which has 3 locations).

In May 2013, the first and only overseas location was opened in San Bruno, California, in the United States.

== See also ==
- List of buffet restaurants
- List of companies of the Philippines
- List of Philippine restaurant chains
