= NLEX Road Warriors draft history =

The NLEX Road Warriors first participated in the Philippine Basketball Association (PBA) Draft on August 24, 2014, two month before their first PBA season. The Road Warriors bought the franchise of the Air21 Express in 2014. NLEX received the rights for all of the Air21's players and its previous draft pick transactions.

Matt Ganuelas-Rosser became the team's first draft choice, the 4th pick in the 2014 PBA Draft. Their highest selection has been at 2nd overall, with which they've selected Kiefer Ravena.

== Selections ==
Basketball positions
PG	Point guard
SG	Shooting guard
SF	Small forward
PF	Power forward
C	Center

Draft	Round	Pick	Player	Pos.	Country of birth*	PBA D-League team	College
2014	1	4	Matt Ganuelas-Rosser	G	Philippines	NLEX (D-League)	CSPU
2015	1	6	Garvo Lanete	SG	Philippines	Hapee Fresh Fighters	San Beda
2015	1	10	Glenn Khobuntin	SF	Philippines	Jumbo Plastic Linoleum Giants	NU
2015	3	25	Jansen Rios	SF	Philippines	LiverMarin Guardians	Adamson
2015	4	36	Jerramy King	SG	United States	AMA Computer University Titans	Cal State Long Beach
2015	5	45	Alfred Batino	C	Philippines	Café France Bakers	CEU
2015	6	50	Edgar Tanuan, Jr.	SF	Philippines	—N/a	FEU
2015	7	53	Arvin Vitug	PG	Philippines	EA Regen Meds	SSC-R
2016	Special draft		Alfonzo Gotladera	C/F	Philippines	Tanduay Light Rhum Masters	Ateneo
2016	2	8	Reden Celda	G	Philippines	Tanduay Light Rhum Masters	NU
2017	1	2	Kiefer Ravena	G	Philippines	—N/a	Ateneo
2017	2	13	John Grospe	F	Philippines	JRU Heavy Bombers	JRU
2017	3	26	Gabriel Dagongon	G	Philippines	Racal Tile Masters	Perpetual
2017	4	37	Felux Apreku	F	Israel	Racal Tile Masters	Letran
2018	1	4	Paul Desiderio	G	Philippines	Go for Gold	UP
2018	1	7	Abu Tratter	C	Philippines	Marinerong Pilipino Skippers	De La Salle
2018	2	16	Kris Porter	F	Philippines	Go for Gold	Ateneo
2018	3	29	Kyles Lao	G	Philippines	AMA	UP
2018	4	38	Dan Wong	G	United States	Go for Gold	Ateneo
2019	Special draft		Matt Nieto	G	Philippines	Cignal-Ateneo	Ateneo
2019	1	3	Mike Ayonayon	G	Philippines	Marinerong Pilipino Skippers	PCU
2019	2	15	Will McAloney	F	Philippines	Marinerong Pilipino Skippers	San Carlos
2019	2	20	AC Soberano	G	Philippines	Cignal HD Hawkeyes - San Beda	San Beda
2019	3	27	Gelo Vito	F/C	Philippines	Wang's Basketball Couriers	UP
2019	4	38	Jayvee Marcelino	G	Philippines	Zark's Jawbreakers - LPU	LPU
2019	5	43	Jeramer Cabanag	G	Philippines	—N/a	San Beda
Season 46	Gilas draft		Tzaddy Rangel	C	Philippines	—N/a	National U
Season 46	1	3	Calvin Oftana	F	Philippines	Cignal HD Hawkeyes - San Beda	San Beda
Season 46	2	20	David Murrell	G/F	United States	—N/a	Cypress College / UP
Season 46	3	28	Antonio Bonsubre	F/C	Philippines	—N/a	San Beda
Season 46	4	39	Jose Presbitero	G/F	Philippines	Cignal HD Hawkeyes - San Beda	San Beda
Season 46	5	49	Joseph Alcantara	G	Philippines	—N/a	La Consolacion
Season 47	1	7	Tyrus Hill	F	United States	—N/a	De La Salle
Season 47	2	21	Chester Saldua	F	United States	—N/a	PCU
Season 47	3	31	Levi dela Cruz	G	Philippines	—N/a	Arellano
Season 48	1	7	Richie Rodger	G	New Zealand	—N/a	UE
Season 48	2	18	Enoch Valdez	G	Philippines	—N/a	Lyceum
Season 48	2	21	Jhan Nermal	F	Philippines	—N/a	West Negros
Season 48	3	30	Dominick Fajardo	F	Philippines	—N/a	Bulacan State
Season 48	4	41	Francis Giussani	G/F	Qatar	—N/a	Enderun
Season 48	5	52	Lorenzo Navarro	G	Philippines	—N/a	Lyceum
Season 49
Season 49	1	6	Jonnel Policarpio	F	Philippines	—N/a	De La Salle
Season 49	2	18	Brandon Ramirez	F	Canada	—N/a	York
Season 49	3	30	Xyrus Torres	G	Philippines	—N/a	FEU
Season 49	4	40	Denzel Wong	G	Philippines	—N/a	Asia Pacific
Season 49	5	47	Adrian Partosa	F	Philippines	—N/a	Benilde

=== Notes ===
1.All players entering the draft are Filipinos until proven otherwise.
