= Yellow Cab Pizza =

Pizza restaurant chain based in the Philippines

Yellow Cab Pizza Co.
- Type: Subsidiary
- Industry: Restaurants
- Founded: April 2001; 25 years ago
- Founders: Eric Puno; Henry Lee; Albert Tan
- Headquarters: Makati, Philippines
- Number of locations: over 200 (2023)
- Products: Pizza, sandwiches, pasta, fried chicken, desserts
- Number of employees: 1,500
- Parent: Max's Group Inc.
- Website: www.yellowcabpizzana.com

Yellow Cab Pizza Co. is a pizza restaurant chain based in the Philippines. Yellow Cab Pizza is currently owned by Max's Group, which also owns the local fried chicken chain Max's Restaurant. Because of having "yellow cab" in its name, many people thought of the chain as a taxi business; however, the name is a reference to the way it frequently uses the colors black and yellow, a pattern seen on New York City taxicabs.

== History ==
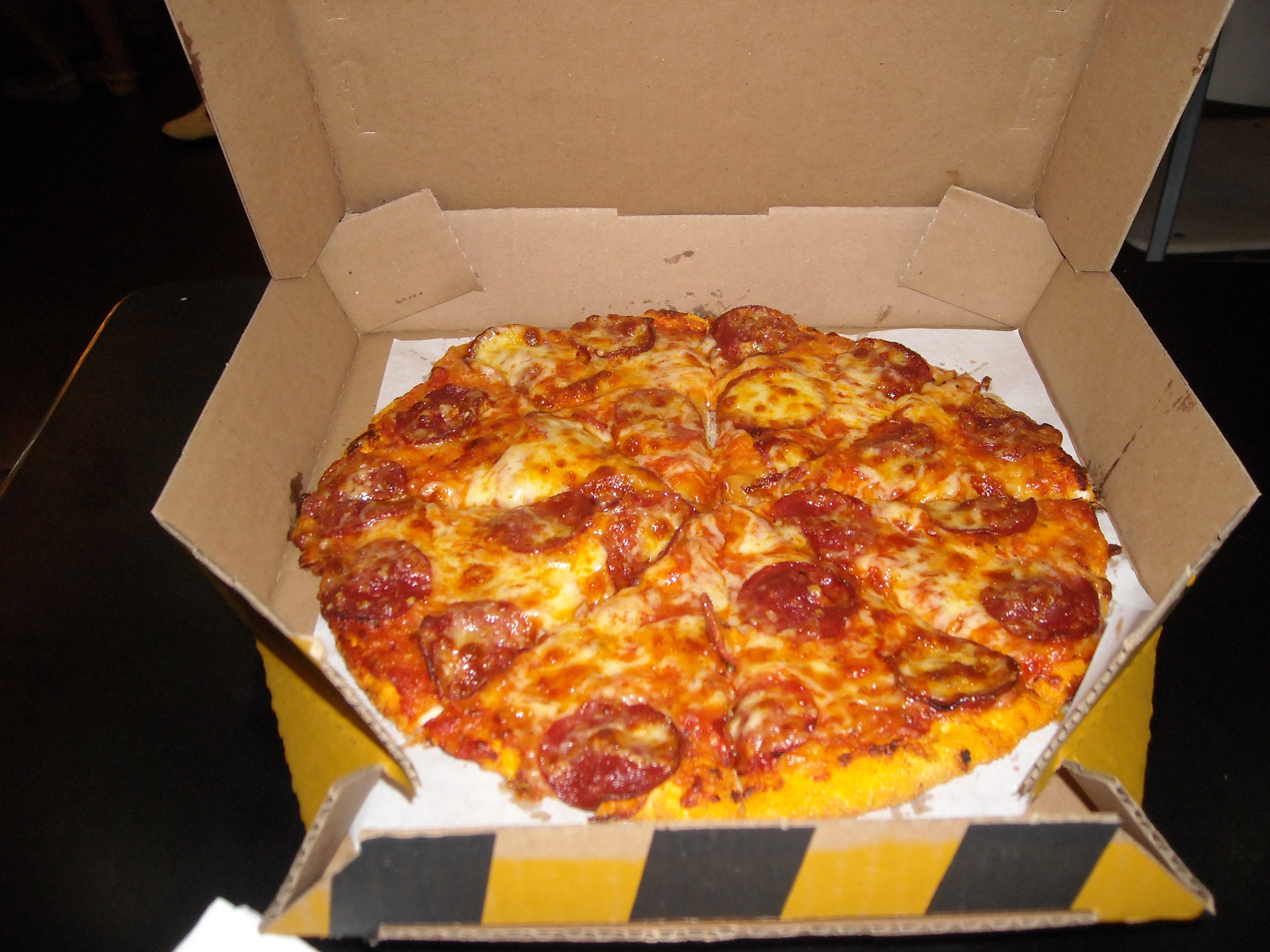
The NY Classic Pepperoni pizza, one of Yellow Cab's trademark dishes

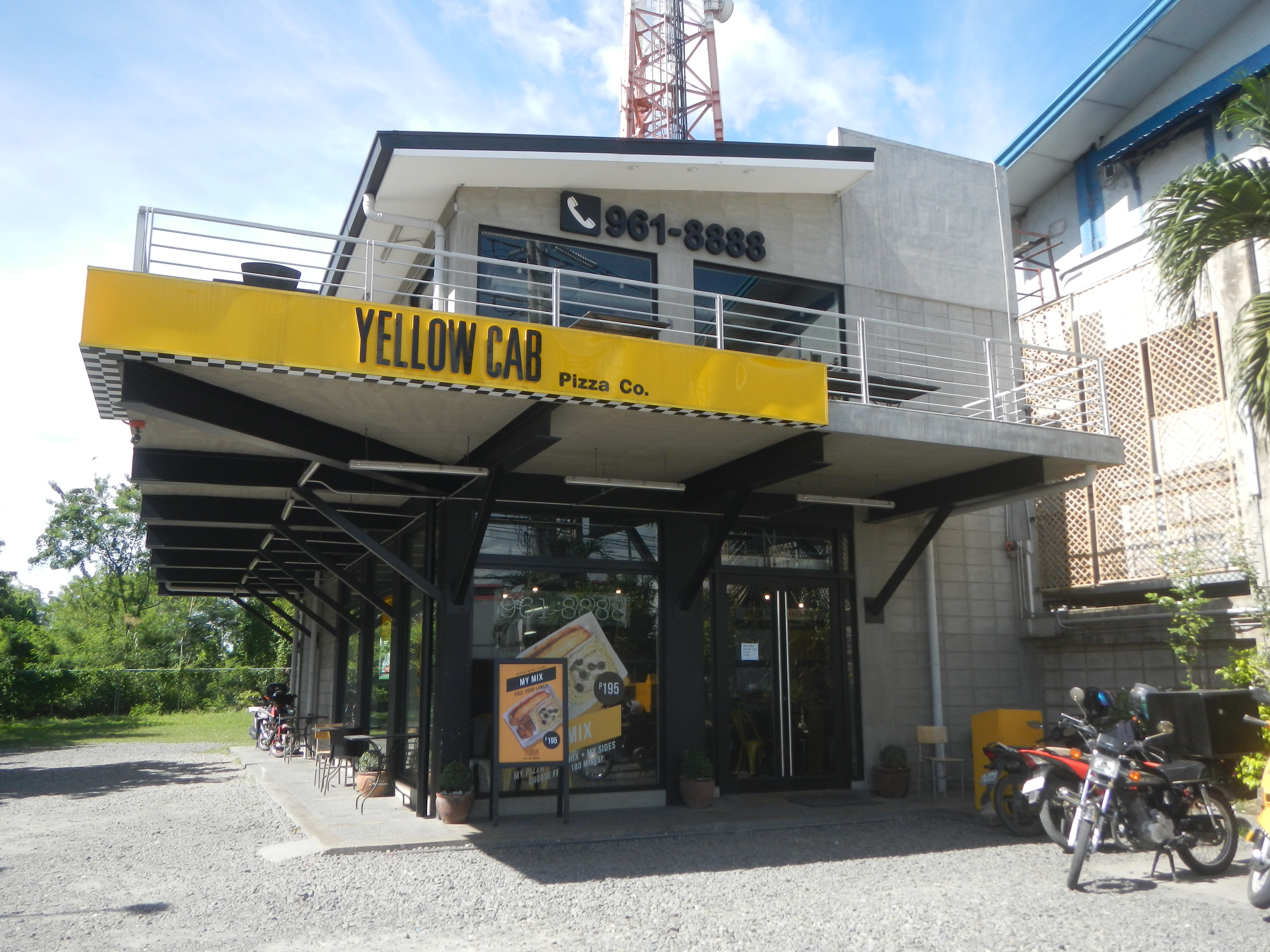
A Yellow Cab branch in San Fernando, Pampanga

The first branch of Yellow Cab Pizza Co. opened along Makati Avenue in Makati in April 2001. It was founded by Eric Puno, Henry Lee and Albert Tan.

=== Expansion ===
In November 2016, Max's Group Inc. (MGI), owner of the Yellow Cab Pizza brand, signed a development agreement deal with the Qatar-based franchise operator Silver Group to open 22 stores in Kuwait, Bahrain and Oman over the coming five years, beginning in January 2017. The agreement is the seventh overseas franchise contract signed by MGI in 2016.

In January 2017, the first Yellow Cab Pizza restaurant opened in the United States. The restaurant, with an address of 801 Dillingham Boulevard along Alakawa Street, Honolulu, Hawaii, is located in a small strip center that's part of the Costco Iwilei complex; the location is next to a Max's Restaurant.

In February 2017, MGI signed a development agreement with the Blue Star Food Corporation in Vietnam to establish at least 12 Yellow Cab stores around the country.

== Location ==
Yellow Cab Pizza currently operates 159 branches in the Philippines and numbers in overseas, including branches in Cambodia, China, Oman, Qatar, Saudi Arabia, Singapore (closed after March 2025), the United Arab Emirates, the United States, and Vietnam.

== Organization ==
Yellow Cab formerly operates a sister restaurant called Army Navy Burger Burrito. The latter was not included in the sale of Yellow Cab to Max's Group, and has spun off as a separate company.

== Involvement in sports ==
=== Motorsports ===
Yellow Cab Pizza also sponsors a team that participates in auto racing. Members of the team include actor Ryan Agoncillo and Alex Perez, who has won three racing titles. One of the chain's founders, Eric Puno, is a fan of racing.

They endorse contestants in motorcycle racing. Among them is Glenn Aguilar, an 11-time national champion.

=== Involvement in football ===
Yellow Cab Pizza is also one of the sponsors of United Football League Division 1 Club Kaya F.C. Members of the club are Azkals players Alexander Borromeo, Chris Greatwich, OJ Porteria, and Kenshiro Daniels.

== Lawsuit ==
In 2008, Yellow Cab Pizza filed a suit against Green Cab Pizza Haus (later Green Avenue Pizza) for using a logo very similar to theirs. The case ended in Yellow Cab's favor and as a result, their competitor was forced to pay a total of ₱400,000.
