= UAAP Season 56 =

University sports season

- Host school: Far Eastern University

Overall
- Seniors: University of Santo Tomas

Seniors' champions
Sport		Men	Women
Basketball		UST	Adamson

Juniors' champions
Sport		Boys	Girls
Basketball		Adamson	N/A
- (NT) = No tournament; (DS) = Demonstration Sport; (Ex) = Exhibition;

UAAP Season 56 is the 1993–1994 season of the University Athletic Association of the Philippines, which was hosted by the Far Eastern University.

It was the coverage by Silverstar Sports aired on New Vision 9 channel 9.

== Men's basketball ==
The University of Santo Tomas (UST) Growling Tigers, headed by a young Dennis Espino swept the elimination round to clinch their first championship since 1967. The Final Four format was supposed to be in its first year of application but since the rules stipulated that once a team wins all of their elimination round games, the postseason is scrapped and that team is declared the automatic champion.

=== Elimination round ===
Pos	Team	W	L	Pts	Final result
1	UST Growling Tigers (C)	14	0	28	Champions (Note: As UST won all of their elimination round games, they were named automatic champions, the playoffs were no longer held, and teams were ranked by elimination round finish.)
2	Adamson Falcons	11	3	25	
3	De La Salle Green Archers	8	6	22	
4	FEU Tamaraws (H)	8	6	22	
5	UE Red Warriors	6	8	20	
6	Ateneo Blue Eagles	6	8	20	
7	UP Fighting Maroons	3	11	17	
8	NU Bulldogs	1	13	15	

(C) Champions; (H) Hosts

=== UST's sweep ===
July 16

Ateneo Blue Eagles	66–93	UST Growling Tigers

Araneta Coliseum, Quezon City

July 24

De La Salle Green Archers	70–80	UST Growling Tigers

Loyola Center, Quezon City

July 27

NU Bulldogs	76–107	UST Growling Tigers

Loyola Center, Quezon City

July 31

Adamson Falcons	78–85	UST Growling Tigers

Loyola Center, Quezon City

August 7

FEU Tamaraws	66–78	UST Growling Tigers

Loyola Center, Quezon City

August 10

UP Fighting Maroons	76–87	UST Growling Tigers

Loyola Center, Quezon City

August 14

UE Red Warriors	77–82	UST Growling Tigers

Loyola Center, Quezon City

August 22

NU Bulldogs	72–99	UST Growling Tigers

Loyola Center, Quezon City

August 25

UE Red Warriors	68–73	UST Growling Tigers

Loyola Center, Quezon City

August 29

UP Fighting Maroons	61–93	UST Growling Tigers

Loyola Center, Quezon City

September 1

Ateneo Blue Eagles	85–113	UST Growling Tigers

Loyola Center, Quezon City

September 4

FEU Tamaraws	58–66	UST Growling Tigers

Loyola Center, Quezon City

September 11

De La Salle Green Archers	84–95	UST Growling Tigers

Loyola Center, Quezon City

September 18

Adamson Falcons	68–75	UST Growling Tigers

Araneta Coliseum, Quezon City
