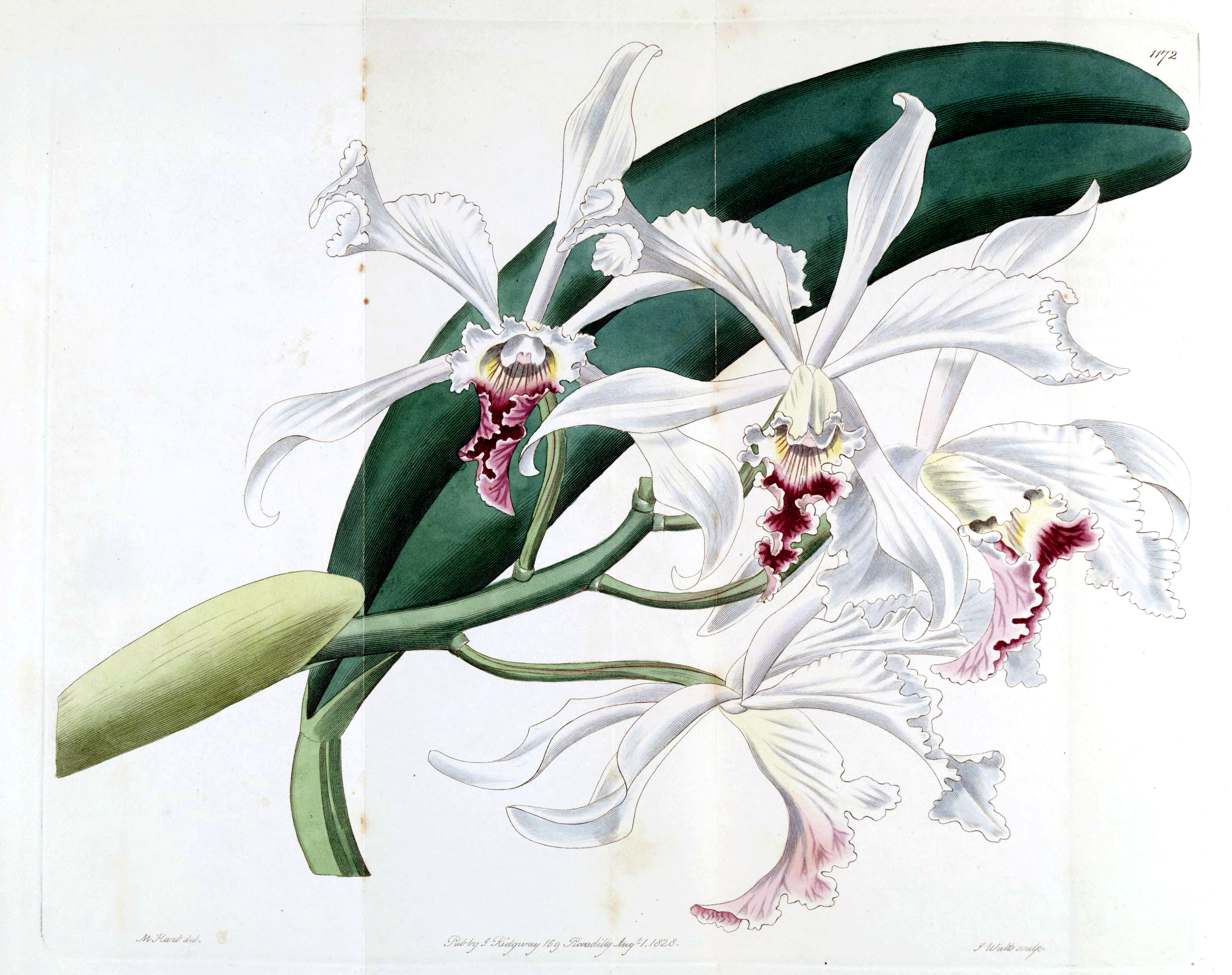
- Illustration of Cattleya crispa

Scientific classification
- Kingdom: Plantae
- Clade: Tracheophytes
- Clade: Angiosperms
- Clade: Monocots
- Order: Asparagales
- Family: Orchidaceae
- Subfamily: Epidendroideae
- Genus: Cattleya
- Subgenus: Cattleya subg. Cattleya
- Section: Cattleya sect. Crispae
- Species: C. crispa

Binomial name
- Cattleya crispa Lindl.

Synonyms
- Bletia crispa (Lindl.) Rchb.f.; Brasilaelia crispa (Lindl.) Campacci; Cattleya reflexa Parm. ex Rchb.f.; Chironella crispa (Lindl.) Braem; Hadrolaelia crispa (Lindl.) Chiron & V.P.Castro; Laelia crispa (Lindl.) Rchb.f.; Sophronitis crispa (Lindl.) Van den Berg & M.W.Chase

= Cattleya crispa =

Species of orchid

Cattleya crispa is a species of orchid indigenous to the Tijuca Mountains north of Rio de Janeiro, Brazil, noted for its crisped and ruffled petals and lip. It is the type species for both the subgenus Cattleya subg. Crispae and its section Cattleya sect. Crispae.

Prior to 2000, C. crispa had long been placed in the genus Laelia because it had eight pollinia, instead of the four found in Cattleya labiata, the type species of the genus Cattleya. In 2000, the "Brazilian Laelias" (including L. crispa) were transferred to the genus Sophronitis. In 2008, the entire genus Sophronitis was sunk into the genus Cattleya, and S. crispa was given its original name of C. crispa.
