= Crispa (clothing brand) =

Shirt brand

- Product type: Shirt
- Current owner: VNF and Sons, Inc.
- Country: Philippines
- Introduced: 1948
- Previous owners: P. Floro & Sons, Inc.; Star Textiles, Inc.
- Website: crispa.ph

Crispa is a Philippine brand of shirts.

== Background ==
Crispa was established in 1948 as a department store chain by the spouses Pablo and Crisanta Floro. The name is a portmanteau of the couple's first names and was later also used for its textile manufacturing business.

The brand gained a good reputation by the 1970s with its line of T-shirts, coinciding with the success of its basketball team, the Crispa Redmanizers. The basketball team was established in 1956 by Valeriano "Danny" Floro, one of the sons of the Floro couple.

The original Crispa shirts and underwear were made purely from cotton and underwent a mechanical process called "Redmanization" to make the cloth dimensionally stable and more resilient to unwanted shrinking after washing. Crispa's garment and textile products were marketed as "Redmanized", "shrunk-to-fit". Crispa would discontinue its manufacturing and retail businesses, as well as disband its basketball team, following the decline of the Floro business enterprises by the late-1980s.

During the mid-2000s, the Crispa brand was briefly revived by Star Textiles, Inc. with a line of shirts similar to the original line.

In 2020, VNF and Sons, Inc., owned by certain grandchildren of Danny Floro, revived the Crispa brand with the introduction of a new line of T-shirts.

== See also ==
- Crispa 400
