= RPN 9 =

RPN 9 may refer to:

- Radio Philippines Network, a Philippine television network owned by Government Communications Group
- Three RPN's regional stations broadcasting on channel 9, including:
  - DZKB-TV, Manila (RPN's flagship TV station)
  - DXWW-TV, Davao
