= 1991–92 Philippine Basketball League season =

1991-92 PBL season
- Duration: December 7, 1991 – December 19, 1992
- Teams: 9
- TV partner: IBC
- Season MVP: Marlou Aquino; Jun Limpot; Johnny Abarrientos
- Philippine Cup champions: Triple-V Foodmasters
- Philippine Cup runners-up: Sta.Lucia Realtors
- Maharlika Cup champions: Sta. Lucia Realtors
- Maharlika Cup runners-up: Triple-V Foodmasters
- Invitational Cup champions: Triple-V Foodmasters
- Invitational Cup runners-up: Sta.Lucia Realtors

Seasons

The 1991-92 PBL season was the 10th season of the Philippine Basketball League (PBL).

== Occurrences ==
- After two conferences of the season, three teams simultaneously disbanded their franchise, these are A&W Pioneer, Crispa White Cement and RC Cola. Two new teams; Serg's Candies and JCT-Evertex, were accepted as probationary members starting the Invitational Cup on October 24, 1992.
- A PBL-Selection participated in the Jones Cup tournament in Taipei.

== Philippine Cup ==
Qualified for semifinals

Team Standings	Win	Loss	PCT
A&W Pioneer	12	4	.750
Triple-V Foodmasters	11	5	.687
New Pop Cola	11	5	.687
Sta. Lucia Realtors	9	7	.562
Crispa White Cement	9	7	.562
Casino Rubbing Alcohol	6	10	.375
RC Cola	5	11	.312
Magnolia Ice Cream	5	11	.312
Burger Machine	4	12	.250

Sta.Lucia defeated Crispa, 81-62, in a playoff on January 21 for last semifinals berth.

The Realtors and the Triple-V Foodmasters came out on top after the double-round semifinals and will play in the championship. Triple-V won their second straight PBL title, defeating the defending Philippine Cup champions Sta.Lucia Realtors by coming back from a 1-2 series deficit to win the last two games.

Team	Game 1 (Feb.8)	Game 2 (Feb.10)	Game 3 (Feb.12)	Game 4 (Feb.15)	Game 5 (Feb.17)	Wins
Triple-V	63	77	73	95	81	3
Sta.Lucia	86	70	76	90	67	2
Venue	NAS	NAS	NAS	NAS	NAS

== Maharlika Cup ==
Qualified for semifinals

Team Standings	Win	Loss	PCT
Sta. Lucia Realtors	12	4	.750
Triple-V Foodmasters	12	4	.750
Magnolia Ice Cream	9	7	.562
Crispa White Cement	9	7	.562
Burger Machine	8	8	.500
Casino Rubbing Alcohol	8	8	.500
A&W Pioneer	6	10	.375
RC Cola	5	11	.312
New Pop Cola	3	13	.188

Six teams advances into the semifinal round. The final standings after the double-round semifinals: Sta.Lucia (19-7), Triple-V (17-9), Magnolia (16-10), Crispa (14-12), Burger Machine (12-14), and Casino (11-15).

Triple-V and Sta.Lucia once again played in the finals. The Sta.Lucia Realtors this time completed a 3-0 sweep and exact revenge over the Foodmasters for the Maharlika Cup title. The Realtors won their 2nd PBL crown while the Foodmasters lost in a finals series for the first time.

Team	Game 1 (July 6)	Game 2 (July 8)	Game 3 (July 11)	Wins
Sta.Lucia	78	76	85	3
Triple-V	71	71	69	0
Venue	RMC	RMC	RMC

== Invitational Cup ==
Qualified for finals
Qualified for finals playoff

#	Semifinal standings	Cumulative				Playoff
#	Semifinal standings	W	L	PCT	GB	Playoff
1	Triple-V Foodmasters	8	2	.800	–-	
2	Sta. Lucia Realtors	6	4	.600	2	
3	Casino Rubbing Alcohol	6	4	.600	2	
4	Burger Machine	5	5	.500	3	
5	Atlanta PVC Pipes	4	6	.400	4	
6	JCT-Evertex	1	9	.100	7	

Five local teams make it to the semifinal round beginning on November 28. The semifinalists' won-loss records in the eliminations will not be carried over and they will start from scratch in order to accommodate guest entry Atlanta Fil-Am, a bunch of Fil-Am cagers from the States, led by the returning Eddie Joe Chavez, who played for the Philippine team under coach Ron Jacobs in the 1981 Jones Cup and among others, Jeffrey Cariaso from Sonoma State and Frank McKinney from University of Hawaii. Four local players beefed up the Atlanta squad coached by disc jockey Bobby Ante.

Triple-V advances in the finals first by beating Sta.Lucia, 73-71, on the last playing date of the semifinal round on December 12, forcing the Realtors in a playoff with Casino Rubbing Alcohol. The Realtors prevailed over the Alcohol Distillers, 63-51, in their knockout game two days later.

For the third time in a year, Triple-V and Sta.Lucia will battle for the PBL championship. The Foodmasters, which acquired Johnny Abarrientos from the disbanded Crispa at the start of the conference, got back over the Realtors via 3-0 sweep in the Invitational Cup finals.

Team	Game 1 (Dec.16)	Game 2 (Dec.18)	Game 3 (Dec.19)	Wins
Triple-V	87	80	78	3
Sta.Lucia	73	72	68	0
Venue	RMC	RMC	RMC
