= 1991 Philippine Basketball League season =

1991 PBL season
- Duration: February 9 - July 24, 1991
- Teams: 8 + 1
- TV partner: Islands TV-13
- Season MVP: Stevenson Solomon; Johnny Abarrientos
- Maharlika Cup champions: Crispa 400
- Maharlika Cup runners-up: Mama's Love
- Challenge Cup champions: Triple-V Foodmasters
- Challenge Cup runners-up: Crispa 400

Seasons
- ← 1990 1991-92 →

The 1991 season of the Philippine Basketball League (PBL).

== Occurrences ==
- The league decided to have only two conferences and the next season will start later in the year to give way for the UAAP and NCAA games.
- A PBL All-Star game was held with the South All-Stars, coach by Roberto Manalili, swept their series against the North All-Stars of coach William Adornado.
- Ogie Narvasa was the new PBL Commissioner starting the second conference of the season called Challenge Cup.

== New teams ==
Two new teams join the league, they are the Triple-V Saisaki Restaurant Group and RC Cola. Burger City takes a conference-leave while Philips Sardines transfer its franchise to A&W Rootbears.

== Maharlika Cup ==
Qualified for semifinals

Team Standings	Win	Loss	PCT
Crispa 400	9	5	.642
Triple-V Foodmasters	9	5	.642
Mama's Love	8	6	.571
Sta. Lucia Realtors	7	7	.500
A & W Rootbears	7	7	.500
Magnolia Ice Cream	6	8	.429
Swift Hotdogs	6	8	.429
RC Cola	4	10	.285

The season opens on February 9. After the double-round eliminations, Magnolia defeated Swift, 80–76, in a playoff game on March 27 for the sixth and last semifinals berth.

Crispa 400 and Cebu's Mama's Love, in their second finals appearance since 1985, played in the championship. The Crispa 400s wins their 2nd PBL title in a 3–1 series victory. After losing Game One, 78–91, the 400s came back to take the next three games and clinch the crown. In a riotous second game which Crispa won, 99–95, the Powder Makers rallied from 21 points down to within two points with 24 seconds left but a bad call from the referee prompted fans from Cebu-based squad to react furiously and started pelting the court and in the process halting play for nearly 20 minutes.

Crispa coach William "Bogs" Adornado, who took over the coaching position from Fortunato "Atoy" Co at the start of the season, won his first title as a mentor. Among his players are Johnny Abarrientos, Victor Pablo, Felix Duhig, Saturnino Garrido, Alejandro Lim, Kevin Ramas, Maximo Delantes, Roberto Jabar, Gil Lumberio, Victor Villarias and Edward Joseph Feihl.

Mama's Love's Stevenson Solomon emerged as the league's leading rebounder and was adjudged Most Valuable Player.

Team	Game 1 (April 20)	Game 2 (April 22)	Game 3 (April 24)	Game 4 (April 27)	Wins
Crispa 400	78	99	92	109	3
Mama's Love	91	95	81	94	1
Venue	NAS	NAS	NAS	NAS

== Challenge Cup ==
Qualified for finals

#	Semifinal Standings	Cumulative				SF	
#	Semifinal Standings	W	L	PCT	GB	W	L
1	Crispa 400	16	6	.727	–-	3	3
2	Triple-V Foodmasters	15	7	.681	1	4	2
3	Sta.Lucia Realtors	15	7	.681	1	4	2
4	Swift Hotdogs	9	13	.410	7	1	5

The import-laced tournament reeled off on May 18 at the Loyola Center in Katipunan Avenue, Quezon City, under new PBL Commissioner Atty. Gregorio "Ogie" Narvasa. The respective teams' imports were Mark Anthony Tillmon of Crispa 400s, who played for the Utah Jazz in the NBA, another NBA veteran Trent Jackson of Sta.Lucia, played one month for the Milwaukee Bucks in 1989, Hollman Harley of Mama's Love, Joey Johnson of Triple-V, Patrick Thompkins of Swift Hotdogs, Johnny Bell of the returning Burger Machine (formerly Burger City), Dominique Stephens of RC Cola, Melvin Reid of A&W Hamburger, and Richard Morgan of Magnolia Ice Cream.

Imports defections hurt the tournament, first to leave was Crispa's Mark Tillmon, who was replaced by Perry Bromwell, then Triple-V's Joey Johnson, who was replaced by Tyrone Pitts. Swift's Patrick Thompkins left the Hotdogs before a playoff with Burger Machine for a semifinal berth. Swift later pick a 6-3 Fil-American guard Mateo Caimol, reportedly a two-time MVP for an NCAA Division III school Erskine College of South Carolina, as his replacement. Sta.Lucia's Trent Jackson led the Realtors to a playoff for the second finals berth against Triple-V but decided to leave before the game and the Realtors lost to the Foodmasters, 81–88.

Triple-V in only their second conference, joined the ranks of champions by beating the Crispa 400s in the best-of-five finals series, 3 games to 1. The Foodmasters won Game One, behind import Tyrone Pitts, who scored 34 points as against Crispa's Perry Bromwell's only 10 points. In Game Two, Triple-V took a commanding 2–0 lead with a 106–98 victory behind once again on the explosive performance of Pitts, scoring 41 points. Crispa's proud legacy gave them a victory in the third game and avoided a possible sweep. In the title-clinching Game Four, regulation ended at 78-all, and in the extension period with the rule first-to-score seven points, the Foodmasters scored seven points first to win, 85–78, and in the process wrapped up its first championship. Triple-V coach Derrick Pumaren led his second PBL team to a title after numerous championships with Magnolia, the Triple-V roster includes Verne Villarias, Allen Sasan, Jolly Escobar, Arthur Ayson, Ronald Cahanding, Dwight Lago and Django Rivera.

Team	Game 1 (July 17)	Game 2 (July 20)	Game 3 (July 22)	Game 4 (July 24)	Wins
Triple-V	89	106	89	85	3
Crispa	83	98	96	78	1
Venue	Loyola Center	Loyola Center	Loyola Center	Loyola Center
