= Max's Group =

Philippine restaurant company

- Company type: Public
- Traded as: PSE: MAXS
- Industry: Restaurants
- Founded: 1954; 72 years ago
- Headquarters: Makati, Metro Manila, Philippines
- Area served: Philippines, United States, United Arab Emirates and Canada
- Key people: Sharon Fuentebella (Chairperson); Robert Trota (President and CEO)
- Revenue: ▲ ₱7.64 billion (2021)
- Net income: ▲ ₱450.98 million (2021)
- Total assets: ▼ ₱14.71 billion (2021)
- Total equity: ▲ ₱4.45 billion (2021)
- Website: www.maxsgroupinc.com

Max's Group, Inc. (locally [ˈmaksɪs]), formerly the Max's Group of Companies, is a restaurant company in the Philippines.

== History ==
The Max's Group foundation is linked to the establishment of Max's of Manila in 1954 by grandmother Maxima Cruz and grandchild Richard Cruz in their home serving primarily to American soldiers. which would become the first outlet of the core restaurant brand of the Max's Group. For years up to around 50 branches were run by family members until Max's restaurant became open for franchising. The first franchised outlet opened in 1997 at the Harrison Plaza in Manila.

The Max's Group started acquiring rights to become the master franchise of foreign brands in the Philippines in 2006, first introducing Krispy Kreme in the country that year. The group also later introduced Jamba Juice.

In 2014, the Max's Group entered the Philippine Stock Exchange through a backdoor listing through Pancake House Inc. gaining control of the latter's brands which include the Pancake House, Teriyaki Boy and Yellow Cab Pizza.

To aid its domestic and international operations, the Max's Group began to acquire Singaporean management firm Global Mac Services in 2015.

The group in May 2018 announced its plan for a further shift to the franchising model within the next five years in a bid to boost the company's growth. At that time 69 of the Max's Group shares are owned by the company while the rest are largely owned by its franchise stores.

In November 2024, the Group's third-quarter net income dropped to 68.3%. In a strategic management of its store network it decided on closures from 657 to 626 branches during the 3 quarters of the year.

== Brands ==
- Max's Restaurant – a multinational Filipino restaurant chain serving mainly Filipino dishes.
- Max's Corner Bakery – a bakery chain owned by Max's Restaurant.
- Yellow Cab Pizza – an NYC-themed pizzeria chain.
- Pancake House – a pancake house chain.
- Teriyaki Boy – a Japanese restaurant chain.
- Sizzlin' Steak – a steakhouse chain.
- Dencio's – a Filipino restaurant chain serving traditional and modern Filipino dishes.
- Krispy Kreme
- Jamba Juice

== See also ==
- Jollibee Foods Corporation
