= 1990 Philippine Basketball League season =

1990 PBL season
- Duration: March 31 – December 19, 1990
- Teams: 7 + 1
- TV partner: PTV
- Season MVP: Jun Limpot; Johnny Abarrientos; Eugene Quilban
- Maharlika Cup champions: Magnolia Ice Cream
- Maharlika Cup runners-up: Philips Sardines
- Challenge Cup champions: Crispa 400
- Challenge Cup runners-up: Philips Sardines
- Philippine Cup champions: Sta. Lucia Realtors
- Philippine Cup runners-up: Burger City

Seasons
- ← 1989 1991 →

The 1990 season of the Philippine Basketball League (PBL).

== New era ==
Under New Commissioner Andy Jao, the Philippine Amateur Basketball League (PABL) starting the new decade will now serve as a farm league to the Professional Philippine Basketball Association (PBA). The Word "Amateur" was dropped and the league was renamed Philippine Basketball League (PBL).

== Rule changes ==
- Games were now played under professional rules. The PBL will be playing four quarters of 12 minutes per period, instead of two halves of 20 minutes.
- The use of two referees, and three free throws awarding a player fouled while attempting from the rainbow territory.
- Each team is entitled five timeouts instead of four as in the old practice, instead of seven team fouls, six gets the team into penalty situation. Only man defense will be allowed, players fouled during penalty situation will be automatically awarded two free throws, eliminating one-and-one and the right to wave.
- A unique rule the PBL implemented was the way an extension is decided, instead of a five-minute extra period, winners will be decided by a tie-breaker, awarding victory to the team that first scored seven points in the extension. According to Commissioner Andy Jao, who apparently was inspired by tennis rules on tie-break, this will eliminate multiple extensions that tend to prolong the game.

== All-star game ==
A PBL All-star game serve as a fitting preliminary game for the much awaited PBA All-star game on June 3 at the ULTRA. Standout PBL players were divided into two teams and the respective coaches were Derek Pumaren and Francis Rodriguez. The North team with players coming from Luzon were composed of Eric Reyes, Eugene Quilban, Joey Guanio, Victor Pablo, Vergel Meneses, Johnedel Cardel, Rene Hawkins, Johnny Abarrientos, Jayvee Gayoso and Arthur dela Cruz. The South team from Visayas and Mindanao had Bonel Balingit, Mark Anthony Tallo, Emilio Chuatico, Edgar Macaraya, Jun Limpot, Bong Ravena, Allen Sasan, Jun Jabar and Cebu sensation Felix Duhig. The Northerners won the exhibition match, 107-102. Named Most Valuable Player of the game was Eugene Quilban of Sta.Lucia Realty.

== Maharlika Cup ==
| Qualified for semifinals |

| Team Standings | Win | Loss | PCT |
|---|---|---|---|
| Magnolia Ice Cream | 9 | 3 | .750 |
| Sta.Lucia Realtors | 8 | 4 | .667 |
| Philips Sardines | 8 | 4 | .667 |
| Crispa 400 | 6 | 6 | .500 |
| Burger City | 6 | 6 | .500 |
| Agfa Color XRG | 3 | 9 | .250 |
| Sarsi Bottlers | 3 | 9 | .250 |

Magnolia Ice Cream and Philips Sardines Canners went on to play in the championship, the Ice Cream Makers retains the Maharlika Cup title with a 3-1 series victory. In Game four, regulation play ended at 89-all, the "first to score seven" rule in the extension period had Magnolia ahead, 95-93, Johnedel Cardel of the Ice Cream Makers was unaware that his team needed only a point to win, he flicked in a triple that swished the net and sent the Magnolia supporters into a frenzied celebration.

| Team | Game 1 (May 12) | Game 2 (May 16) | Game 3 (May 19) | Game 4 (May 22) | Wins |
|---|---|---|---|---|---|
| Magnolia | 83 | W | 90 | 98 OT | 3 |
| Philips | 80 | L | 91 | 93 | 1 |
| Venue | NAS | NAS | NAS | NAS |

== Challenge Cup ==
| Qualified for semifinals |

| Team Standings | Win | Loss | PCT |
|---|---|---|---|
| Crispa 400 | 10 | 2 | .833 |
| Philips Sardines | 9 | 3 | .750 |
| Sta.Lucia Realtors | 7 | 5 | .583 |
| Magnolia Ice Cream | 6 | 6 | .500 |
| Agfa Color XRG | 5 | 7 | .417 |
| Sarsi Bottlers | 3 | 9 | .250 |
| Burger City | 2 | 10 | .250 |

The PBL Challenge Cup opens on May 27, the league brought in Imports standing no taller than 6-3 for the first time in an effort to spike interest and draw the crowds to watch the games. The Reinforcements were Andy Grosvenor of Philips Sardines, a former Shell import in the PBA, Junie Lewis of Agfa Colors, a second round draft pick by the Utah Jazz last year, Sean "Popeye" Paulfrey of Sarsi, Daniel Boney of Crispa, Tony Tucker of Sta.Lucia, Tye "Sky" King of Burger City and Brent Carmichael of Magnolia, the smallest among the imports.

In the eliminations, the Philips Sardines Canners went unbeaten for nine games before losing their last three assignments. Three imports were replaced by their respective teams, James Burkley replaces Tucker at Sta.Lucia, Derek Lockhart came in for Tye King at Burger City, and Crispa paraded Derek Taylor at the start of the second round.

After the one-round semifinals among six teams, Crispa (15-2) and Philips (11-5) made it to the championship round. Magnolia (8-8) and Sta.Lucia (8-9) dispute third place. Agfa and Sarsi ended up with 7-10 and 5-12 won-loss slates.

Crispa 400 completed a 14-game winning streak and a 3-0 finals sweep over highly touted Philips Sardines Canners. Crispa import Derek Taylor and tournament MVP Johnny Abarrientos were responsible for the 400s' resurgence. Crispa easily took the first two games of the finals series and when Philips import Andy Grosvenor left for Game three, the 400s clinch the championship in a 106-99 victory. Coach Atoy Co won his first title as a full-time mentor.

| Team | Game 1 (July 7) | Game 2 (July 9) | Game 3 (July 11) | Wins |
|---|---|---|---|---|
| Crispa 400 | 97 | 107 | 106 | 3 |
| Philips | 87 | 88 | 99 | 0 |
| Venue | RMC | RMC | RMC |

== Philippine Cup ==
| Qualified for semifinals |

| Team Standings | Win | Loss | PCT |
|---|---|---|---|
| Sta.Lucia Realtors | 10 | 2 | .833 |
| Burger City | 8 | 4 | .667 |
| Crispa 400 | 8 | 4 | .667 |
| Magnolia Ice Cream | 5 | 7 | .417 |
| Swift Hotdogs | 5 | 7 | .417 |
| Philips Sardines | 4 | 8 | .333 |
| Mama's Love | 2 | 10 | .250 |

Agfa Colors didn't participate in the season-ending conference, Sarsi Bottlers were renamed Swift Hotdogs and returning to PBL action is Cebu-based Mama's Love, which placed last in the seven-team field and were eliminated. After the two-round semifinals, the Sta.Lucia Realtors clinch the first finals berth with a 16-6 won-loss card, Burger City and Crispa were tied at second with 14-8. Burger City makes it to the finals for the first time, following a 90-79 victory over Crispa in their knockout game on December 10.

Sta.Lucia Realtors finally ended frustrations of bridesmaid finishes by winning the Philippine Cup title, defeating Burger City, 94-83 in Game four, for a 3-1 series victory. The Burger Masters avoided a sweep by winning the third game, 82-81, on Rafael Dinglasan's buzzer-beating triple.

| Team | Game 1 (Dec 12) | Game 2 (Dec 15) | Game 3 (Dec 17) | Game 4 (Dec 19) | Wins |
|---|---|---|---|---|---|
| Sta.Lucia | 105 | 87 | 81 | 94 | 3 |
| Burger City | 83 | 69 | 82 | 83 | 1 |
| Venue | RMC | RMC | RMC | RMC |
