= Dencio's =

Restaurant group based in the Philippines

Dencio's Bar and Grill
- Company type: Wholly owned subsidiary
- Industry: Restaurants
- Founded: 1991; 35 years ago in Quezon City, Philippines
- Founders: Dennis Nakpil; Dennis Mariano Jr.
- Headquarters: Makati, Philippines
- Number of locations: 30
- Key people: Martin P. Lorenzo (CEO)
- Products: Philippine cuisine
- Revenue: ₱249 million ▼ (2007)
- Net income: ₱60 million ▲ (2008)
- Parent: Max's Group Inc. (formerly Pancake House Inc.)
- Website: www.dencios.com.ph

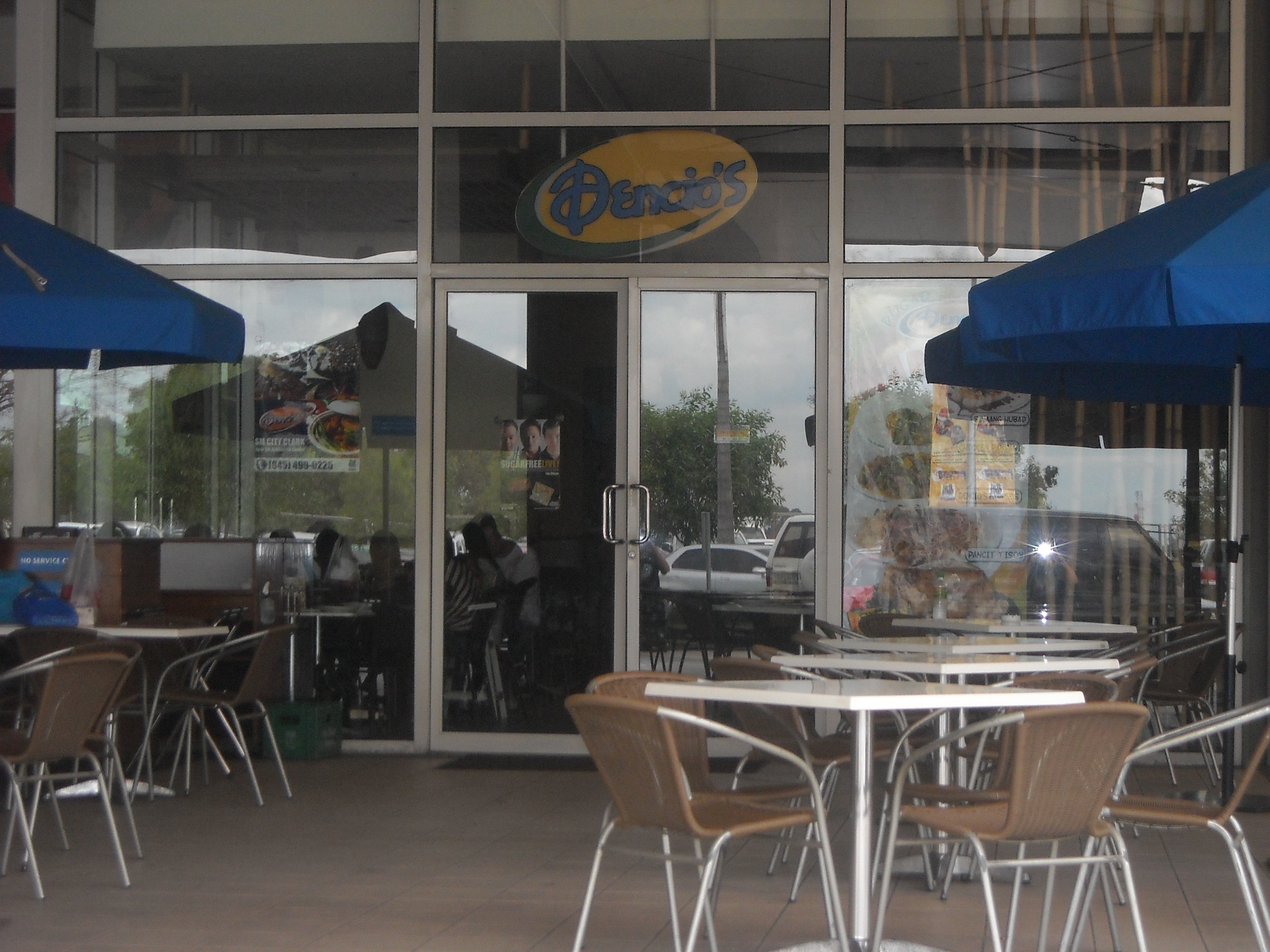
A Dencio's branch at SM City Clark, Angeles City.

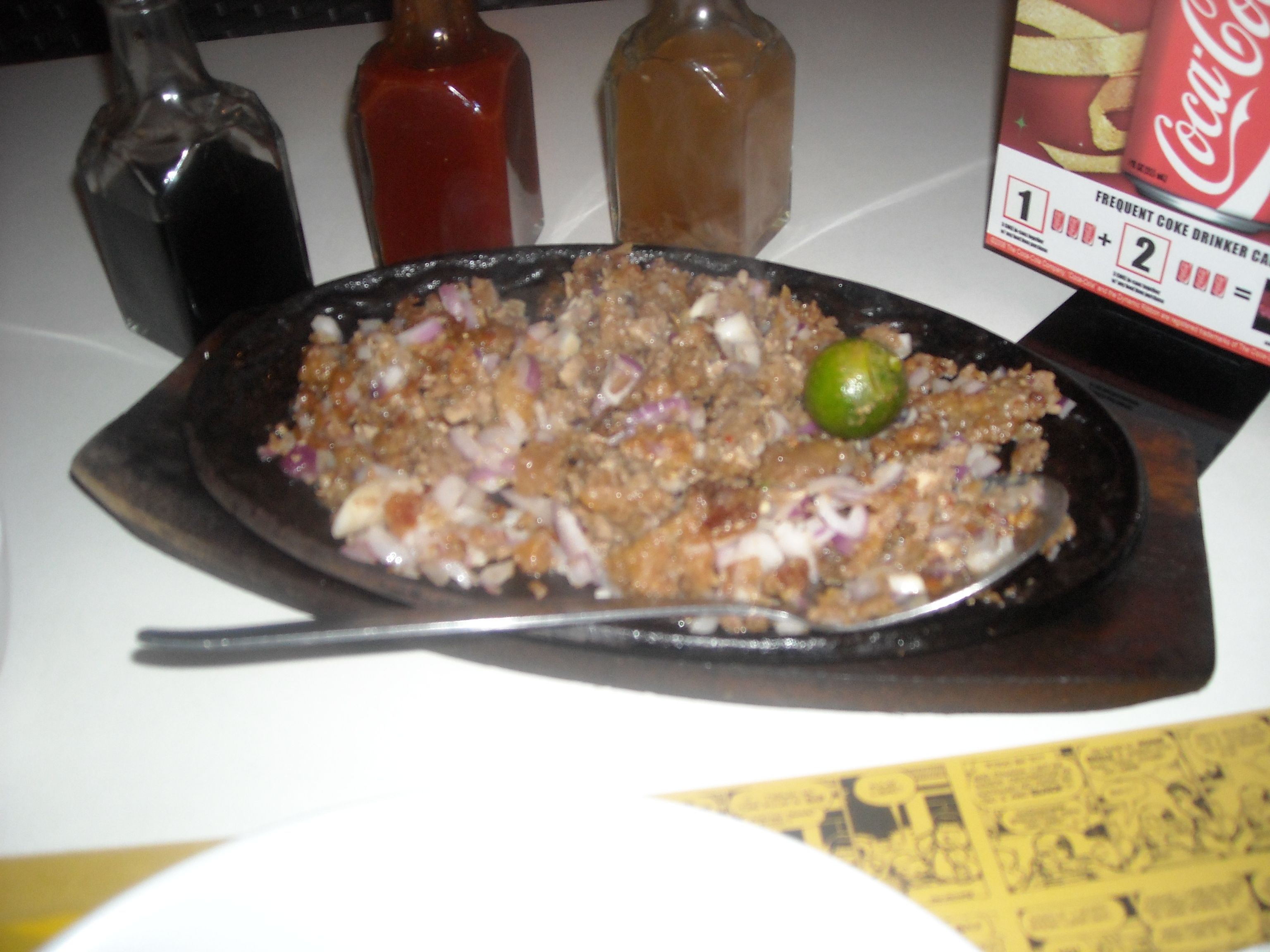
Sisig served on a hot plate.

Dencio's Bar and Grill, simply referred to as Dencio's, is a group of restaurants based in the Philippines.

== History ==
Dennis Nakpil and Dennis Mariano Jr. thought of creating a restaurant that emphasizes certain Philippine traditions. Their principle was "bringing the BARRIO into the metropolis." Thus, they opened one in Quezon City in 1991. They named it Dencio's. Dencio is a Philippine variant of Dennis, the name of the two founders.

In 2004, Dencio's was purchased by Pancake House, Inc. (now Max's Group, Inc.) for ₱160 million. To buy the chain, almost all that money (₱150 million or 93.75% of the price) had to be borrowed from banks.

== Pugad Dencio's ==
Some characters from Pugad Baboy, a famous comic strip in the Philippines, are portrayed in Dencio's ads and menus. This was a concept proposed by two officials of the chain. It was believed though that the comic characters and the restaurant chain make a more perceived image of the local table custom. They call this Pugad Dencio's. This form of advertisement also goes with a song which is performed by rock band Sugarfree.
