= Crispa 400 =

- Leagues: MICAA (1977-1981); PBL (1989-1992)
- Founded: 1975
- Location: Philippines
- Team colors: Forest green, white, gold
- Head coach: MICAA: Filomeno Pumaren; Narciso Bernardo ✝ PBL: Arturo Valenzona; Fortunato Co, Jr. William Adornado
- Ownership: Valeriano "Danny" L. Floro ✝
- Championships: PBL (2): *1990 Challenge Cup; *1991 Maharlika Cup
Light	Dark

Crispa 400 was the name of two amateur basketball teams owned by P. Floro and Sons, Inc. that played in the Manila Industrial and Commercial Athletic Association (MICAA) from 1977 to 1981 and the Philippine Basketball League (PBL) from 1989 to 1992, respectively. The name Crispa 400 refers to a line of T-shirts manufactured by the Floro company.

The first team maintained Crispa's presence in amateur basketball following the transfer of the original Crispa franchise to the Philippine Basketball Association in 1975. It disbanded with the demise of the MICAA in 1982.

In 1986, Crispa returned to the commercial basketball scene by joining the National Seniors tournament early that year. The players that made up the new Crispa team included Glenn Capacio, Eric Altamirano and Jack Tanuan, who would all become members of the national team for the 1986 Asian Games, and among others; Ato Agustin, Jeffrey Graves and Adriano Polistico. The team was coached by Arturo Valenzona. In October 1986, Crispa would merge with the Lhuillier Jewelers ballclub that won the PABL First Conference championship and the team became known as Crispa-Lhuillier.

Crispa joined the PABL in 1989, winning two titles, and disbanded in 1992. Two years later, a Chinese selection playing as a guest team in the PBL was sponsored by Crispa.

Crispa's basketball prime mover, Valeriano "Danny" Floro, died on February 24, 1995.

== MICAA (1977–1981) ==
- Team names: Crispa Swingers / Crispa 400 / Walk Tall Jeans / Crispa 400 Redmanizers
- Coach: Narciso Bernardo

=== Notable players ===
- Uldarico Acuña
- Pedro Alfaro
- Jose Arguelles
- Antonio Azurin
- Edgardo Baldomero
- Conrado Banal
- Noli Banate
- Henry Brodett
- Rolando Cariño
- Jose Bernardo "Joy" Carpio
- Edgardo Cordero
- Juanito dela Cruz
- Victor Dalupan
- Rudy Distrito
- Angelito Esguerra
- Reynaldo Gomez
- Dante Gonzalgo
- Edgar Guidaben
- Filomeno Gulfin
- Leo Isaac
- Federico "Padim" Israel
- Jimmy Javier
- Renato Kabigting
- Eugene Leaño
- Ludolfo Ludovice
- Roberto Manalaysay
- Francisco Maristela
- Kenneth McMurray
- Abito Orcullo
- Abelardo Ortiz
- Wilfredo Paez
- Jose Salas
- Alfredo Serafica
- Gregorio Rastrullo
- Steve Watson
- Edmund Yee

== PBL (1989-1992) ==
- Team names: Crispa Redmanizers / Crispa 400 / Crispa White Cement
- Coaches: Arturo Valenzona (1989), Fortunato Co, Jr (1990), Bogs Adornado (1991–1992).
- Team Manager: Antonio Uichico

=== Rosters (years played) ===
- Alejo Alolor (1989) (played one conference before returning to the PBA)
- Daniel Arango (1989)
- Pat Codiñera (1989–1990)
- Rolando Cruz (1989–1990)
- Bernie Fabiosa (1989) (played two conferences before returning to the PBA)
- Saturnino Garrido (1989–1991)
- Napoleon Hatton (1989)
- Roberto Jabar (1989–1992)
- Oscar Latoreno (1989)
- Sixto Mondarte (1989–1990)
- Victor Pablo (1989–1991)
- Joseph Pelaez (1989)
- Aldo Perez (1989)
- Johnny Abarrientos (1989–1992) (started playing in the 3rd conference of 1989 season)
- Gene Afable (1989–1990) (started playing in the 3rd conference of 1989 season)
- Olsen Racela (1989–1990) (started playing in the 3rd conference of 1989 season)
- Ramil Basa (1990)
- Maximo Delantes (1990–1991)
- Felix Duhig (1990–1992)
- Rene Hawkins (1990)
- Allen Sasan (1990)
- Julian Tomacruz (1990)
- Jose Villarama (1990)
- Victor Villarias (1990–1991)
- Rudy Enterina (1990)
- Kevin Ramas (1990–1992) (started playing in the 3rd conference of 1990 season)
- Albert David (1991–1992)
- Nestor Echano (1991–1992)
- Estelito Epondulan (1991–1992)
- Edward Joseph Feihl (1991)
- Alejandro Lim (1991)
- Gil Lumberio (1991)
- Romulo Orillosa (1991–1992)
- Giovanni Pineda (1992)
- Eric Quiday (1991–1992)
