= Burger Machine =

Philippine restaurant chain

- Industry: Fast food
- Founded: 1981; 44 years ago
- Headquarters: Philippines
- Parent: Gilmore Food Corporation

Burger Machine is a Filipino chain of fast-food restaurants owned by the Burger Machine Holdings Corporation, a sub-company of the Philippine-based Gilmore Food Corporation.

The chain is notable for its outdoor stalls commonly located along streets and gas stations with 24/7 service and affordable prices.

== History ==
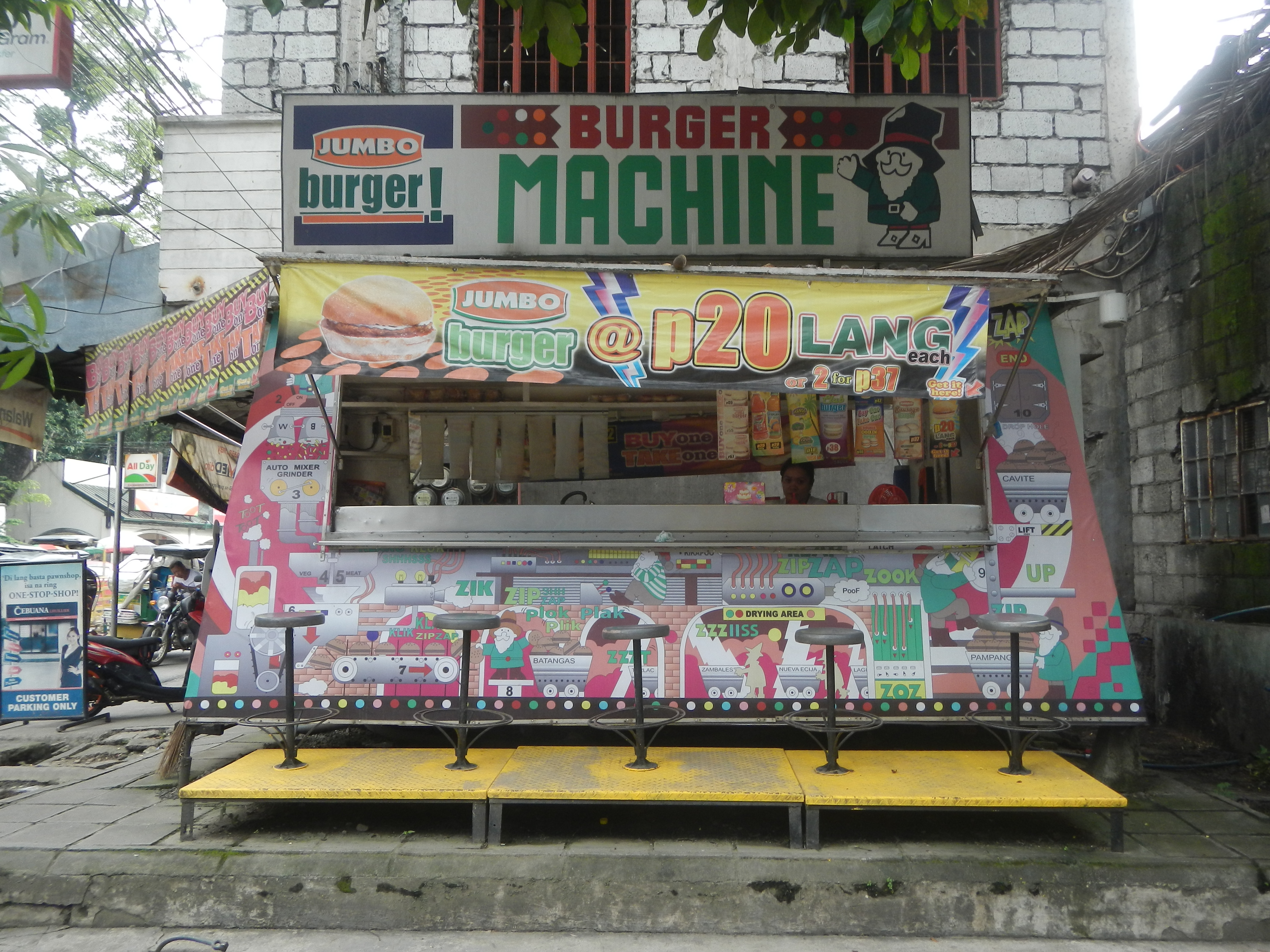
A typical Burger Machine stand in Baliwag

Burger Machine was established in 1981 by Fe Esperanza S. Rodriguez and a sister who both planned to turn two old small buses into mobile stores, an idea they adapted from America. It was their fondness for hamburgers that inspired them to make a business that would serve for the masses.

Its first store was opened at a Caltex gasoline station at the intersection of EDSA and Julia Vargas Avenue in Mandaluyong, Metro Manila. Currently, the Caltex gas station no longer exists as the area was developed into SM Megamall. The EDSA outlet was followed with a second store further north at the intersection of Aurora Boulevard and Gilmore Avenue in Quezon City. The first two stores operated with a capital of ₱40,000 with nearly two dozen employees and 24/7 service. This earned Burger Machine the nickname of "the burger that never sleeps."

A year later, a third store was opened. The company was nationally recognized. In June 1988, the company established six food plazas in areas such as Timog, Cubao, Tandang Sora Avenue, Makati, Padre Faura and Marikina.

In 1990, a corporate office along EDSA was opened and was called the EDSA Business Unit. It was also in this year when the Food and Nutrition Research Institute of the Department of Science and Technology confirmed their burgers as “source of the most nutrients in terms of peso value compared to other leading hamburger chains.” Through the years, Burger Machine launched dozens of branches including stalls and full-scale fast food restaurants. But during the Asian Financial Crisis of the 90's, the company saw more struggles and was forced to close down several branches and restaurants.

The company is also dubbed "the National Burger Stand of the Philippines." As of 2011, Burger Machine has 1,000+ outlets across the country.

== Branding ==
One distinctive character associated with the company is the dwarf which appears on every outlet. For a number of years it had been unnamed. Later in 1988, it was given one, Burger Bart through a name contest.

Graphic designer/visual communicator Zeus Paredes coined the name "BURGER MACHINE" and designed the original logo and graphics on the mobile stores.

The business was widely advertised on television in the mid-1990s. Among those who helped promote it include the Philippines' late master rapper Francis Magalona and iconic band The Eraserheads.

== Permit controversy ==
In 2007, it was revealed that a majority of Burger Machine's stores in Quezon City have been operating without business licenses. Because of this, the Quezon City Market Development and Administration Department gave them 15 days to go with the demands lest Burger Machine as well as its parent Gilmore would undergo such consequences, specifically having those stores closed.

== See also ==
- List of hamburger restaurants
