= 1989 in Philippine television =

The following is a list of events effecting Philippine television in 1989. Events listed include television show debuts, finales, cancellations, and channel launches, closures and rebrandings, as well as information about controversies and carriage disputes.

== Events ==
- January 16: Davao City hosts a localized TV Patrol edition with the launch of TV Patrol Mindanao.
- February 18: Eat Bulaga! premiered on ABS-CBN and was staged at Araneta Coliseum, with a TV special titled Eat... Bulaga!: Moving On.
- March 17: Lunch Date celebrated their 3rd anniversary, with big-named stars guesting. They also unveiled the new theme song of the show.
- September: ABS-CBN makes history with satellite broadcasts to Filipinos living in the Northern Mariana Islands and Guam, the first overseas broadcasts for a Philippine television network via satellite relay.
- September 23: Tito, Vic and Joey celebrated the 10th anniversary of Eat Bulaga! with another TV special staged at Araneta Coliseum.
- October 8: Radio Philippines Network is relaunched as the New Vision 9 network with its tagline "The Future", while RPN remains its corporate name, its news service is rebranded as News9.
- December 1–9: Coverage of the 1989 Philippine coup attempt airs on all stations, with ABS-CBN making one of the first nationwide via satellite news coverages ever made.

== Premieres ==
Date	Show
January 15	Tawag ng Tanghalan (season 3) on ABS-CBN 2
January 16	TV Patrol Mindanao on ABS-CBN TV-4 Davao
February 16	Okay Ka, Fairy Ko! on ABS-CBN 2
February 16	Campus Break on IBC 13
February 18	Budoy on ABS-CBN 2
February 18	Eat Bulaga! on ABS-CBN 2
February 18	Coney Reyes on Camera on ABS-CBN 2
February 18	She-Ra: Princess of Power on ABS-CBN 2
February 18	Pinoy Fantasy on ABS-CBN 2
February 18	Tagalog Movie Greats on ABS-CBN 2
February 19	Discovery Drama Theatre on ABS-CBN 2
February 20	Student Canteen on RPN 9
February 20	Agila on ABS-CBN 2
February 20	Mga Kasaysayan sa Likod ng TV Patrol on ABS-CBN 2
March 13	PTV Newsbreak on PTV 4
March 27	The Maricel Drama Special on ABS-CBN 2
July 11	The Wonder Years on GMA 7
August 14	Cafe Bravo on ABS-CBN 2
August 20	Mel & Jay on ABS-CBN 2
September 4	El Corazon de Oro on IBC 13
October 9	The Hour Updates on New Vision 9
November 27	Anna Luna on ABS-CBN 2
November 27	Bantay Balita on IBC 13
November 27	Headline Trese on IBC 13
December 1	Superstar: The Legend on IBC 13
December 3	Sa Linggo nAPO Sila on ABS-CBN 2

=== Unknown ===
- Dobol Trobol on RPN 9
- Blotter on RPN 9
- Isip Pinoy on RPN 9
- Correctionals on RPN 9
- Hilda Drama Specials on RPN 9
- Basta Barkada on RPN 9
- Bubog sa Puso on ABS-CBN 2
- Sta. Zita at si Mary Rose on ABS-CBN 2
- Del Monte Kitchenomics on ABS-CBN 2
- Seiko TV Presents on ABS-CBN 2
- Ellas A.D. on ABS-CBN 2
- Cooking Atbp on ABS-CBN 2
- Cooking It Up with Nora on ABS-CBN 2
- Aiko Drama Special on IBC 13
- Regal Shocker on IBC 13
- 13, 14, 15 on IBC 13
- Chikiting Patrol on IBC 13
- Kalatog Pa Rin on IBC 13
- Motoring Today on IBC 13
- Movietime on IBC 13
- OK ka'tol on IBC 13
- Pelikula sa Trese on IBC 13
- Regal Family on IBC 13
- Saint Peregrine: TV Sunday Mass on IBC 13
- Viva Spotlight on GMA 7
- A Little Night of Music on GMA 7
- Family 3 + 1 on GMA 7
- Pabuenas sa Siete on GMA 7
- Issues and Answers on GMA 7
- Bulilit on GMA 7
- Word of Hope on GMA 7
- Yamara! A Fashionable Judo Girl on GMA 7
- Kiteretsu on ABS-CBN 2
- Transformers on IBC 13
- Garfield and Friends on ABS-CBN 2
- The Comic Strip on RPN 9
- Voltes V on IBC 13
- Woody Woodpecker on IBC 13
- Jayce and the Wheeled Warriors on GMA 7
- She-Ra: Princess of Power on ABS-CBN 2
- Thundercats on GMA 7
- Teenage Mutant Ninja Turtles on IBC 13
- Maskman on ABS-CBN 2
- Daimos on ABS-CBN 2
- Murphy Brown on ABS-CBN 2
- Spielban on ABS-CBN 2
- A Dangerous Life on GMA 7
- Saved by the Bell on GMA 7
- The Wonder Years on GMA 7

== Returning or renamed programs ==
Show	Last aired	Retitled as/Season/Notes	Channel	Return date
Tawag ng Tanghalan	1988	Same (season 3)	ABS-CBN	January 15
Student Canteen	1986 (GMA)	Same	RPN (now New Vision 9)	February 20
Philippine Basketball Association	1988 (season 14: "Reinforced Conference")	Same (season 15: "Open Conference")	PTV	March 5
Philippine Amateur Basketball League	1988 (season 6: "Maharlika Cup")	Same (season 7: "Invitational Cup")	PTV	March 26
Philippine Amateur Basketball League	1989 (season 7: "Invitational Cup")	Same (season 7: "Freedom Cup")	PTV	June
Philippine Basketball Association	1989 (season 15: "Open Conference")	Same (season 15: "All-Filipino Conference")	PTV	June 18
University Athletic Association of the Philippines	1989 (IBC)	Same (season 52)	RPN (now New Vision 9)	July
National Collegiate Athletic Association	1989	Same (season 65)	PTV	July 30
Philippine Basketball Association	1989 (season 15: "All-Filipino Conference")	Same (season 15: "Reinforced Conference")	PTV	October 1
Philippine Amateur Basketball League	1989 (season 7: "Freedom Cup")	Same (season 7: "Maharlika Cup")	PTV	October
National Basketball Association	1989	Same (1989–90 season)	GMA	November
Superstar	1989 (RPN)	Superstar: The Legend	IBC	December 1

== Programs transferring networks ==
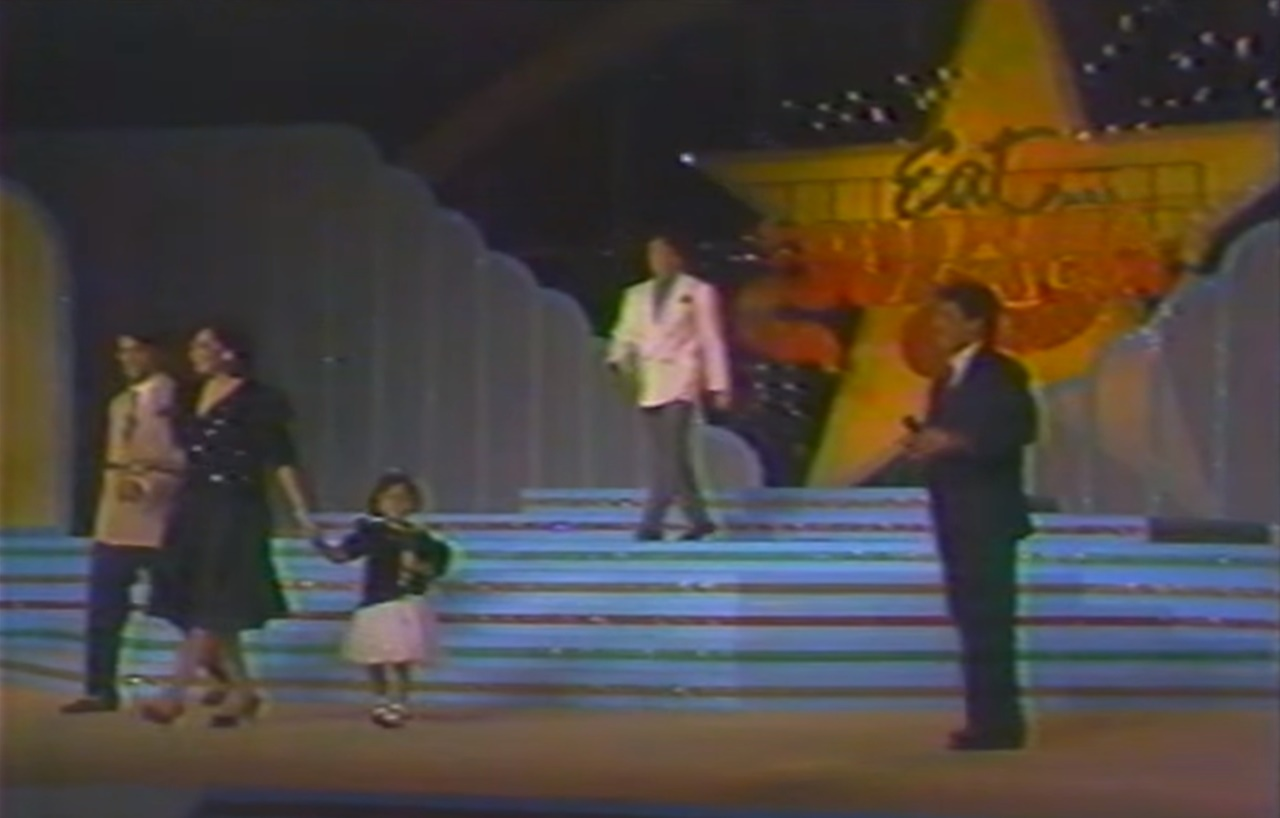
18 February 1989: Eat... Bulaga! hosts (L-R) Vic Sotto, Coney Reyes, Aiza Seguerra, Joey de Leon and Tito Sotto on the TV special "Eat... Bulaga!: Moving On", marking the show's transfer from RPN 9 to ABS-CBN 2

Date	Show	No. of seasons	Moved from	Moved to
February 16	Okay Ka, Fairy Ko!	—N/a	IBC	ABS-CBN
February 18	Eat... Bulaga!	—N/a	RPN (now New Vision 9)	ABS-CBN
February 20	Student Canteen	—N/a	GMA	RPN (now New Vision 9)
February 20	Agila	—N/a	RPN (now New Vision 9)	ABS-CBN
February 25	Coney Reyes on Camera	—N/a	RPN (now New Vision 9)	ABS-CBN
July	University Athletic Association of the Philippines	—N/a	IBC	RPN (now New Vision 9)
December 1	Superstar	—N/a	RPN (now New Vision 9)	IBC (as Superstar: The Legend)
Unknown	Seiko TV Presents	—N/a	RPN (now New Vision 9)	ABS-CBN
Unknown	Chikiting Patrol	—N/a	ABS-CBN	IBC
Unknown	Voltes V	—N/a	RPN (now New Vision 9)	IBC
Unknown	Pinoy Wrestling	—N/a	PTV	IBC
Unknown	Regal Shocker	—N/a	GMA	IBC

== Finales ==
- February 9:
  - Okay Ka, Fairy Ko! on IBC 13
  - Viva Blockbusters on ABS-CBN 2
- February 11: Coney Reyes on Camera on RPN 9
- February 16: Apple Pie, Patis, Pate, Atbp. on RPN 9
- February 17:
  - Afternoon Delight on ABS-CBN 2
  - Eat Bulaga! on RPN 9
  - Agila on RPN 9
- March 20: Maricel Regal Drama Special on ABS-CBN 2
- August 20: GMA Saturday/Sunday Report on GMA 7
- October 1: Superstar on RPN 9
- October 8: RPN NewsBreak on New Vision 9
- November 24:
  - Balita sa IBC on IBC 13
  - Balita sa IBC: Huling Ulat on IBC 13
- November 26: Tawag ng Tanghalan (season 3) on ABS-CBN 2

=== Unknown ===
- Banyuhayon on RPN 9
- Dobol Trobol on RPN 9
- Kaluskos-Musmos on RPN 9
- Seiko TV Presents on RPN 9
- Lutong Bahay on RPN 9
- Voltes V on RPN 9
- Golpe de Gulo on GMA 7
- Bubog sa Puso on ABS-CBN 2
- Regal Drama Presents on ABS-CBN 2
- Pinoy Fantasy on ABS-CBN 2
- Budoy on ABS-CBN 2
- Let's Go Crazy with Jack & Joey on ABS-CBN 2
- Dina on ABS-CBN 2
- Morning Treats on ABS-CBN 2
- Not So Late Night With Edu on ABS-CBN 2
- Manila, Manila on ABS-CBN 2
- Chikiting Patrol on ABS-CBN 2
- Sitak ni Jack on IBC 13
- T.O.D.A.S.: Television's Outrageously Delightful All-Star Show on IBC 13
- Pinoy Thriller on IBC 13
- Kalatog Pa Rin on IBC 13
- Pinoy Wrestling on IBC 13
- Cine Pinoy on IBC 13
- Pelikula sa Trese on IBC 13
- Regal Juvenile on IBC 13
- Regal Theater on IBC 13
- Funfare on IBC 13
- Tic Tac Boom on IBC 13
- Regal Shocker on GMA 7
- U.F.O.: Urbano, Felissa & Others on GMA 7
- Date a Star on GMA 7
- Someone's on Your Side on GMA 7
- Transformers on IBC 13
- Voltron on IBC 13
- Garfield and Friends on ABS-CBN 2
- The Comic Strip on RPN 9
- Woody Woodpecker on IBC 13
- Jayce and the Wheeled Warriors on GMA 7
- She-Ra: Princess of Power on ABS-CBN 2
- Thundercats on GMA 7
- Teenage Mutant Ninja Turtles on IBC 13
- Goggle V on ABS-CBN 2
- Denjiman on ABS-CBN 2
- Kidsongs on ABS-CBN 2
- The Young and the Restless on ABS-CBN 2
- A Dangerous Life on GMA 7
- ALF on GMA 7
- The Facts of Life on GMA 7
- Tele-Aralan ng Kakayahan on PTV 4

== Births ==
- January 9 - Fely Irvine
- January 12 - Arci Muñoz, Filipina actress and commercial model
- January 20 - Isabella Isa Fabregas, marketing assistant and singer
- January 22 -
  - Rich Asuncion, actress
  - RJ Padilla, actor
- January 25 - Yasmien Kurdi, actress, singer and mother
- January 29 - Dawn Chang, member of Girltrends
- February 5 - Cristine Reyes, Filipina actress
- February 13 - Kenneth Ken Punzalan, actor and dancer
- March 3 - Sef Cadayona, actor
- March 7 - Gerald Anderson (Born Gerald Randolph Opsima Anderson Jr.), Filipino American actor (The Former Loveteam of Kim Chiu in 4 years "2006-2010" and Sarah Geronimo in 1 year "2011-2012" and Former Relationship of Maja Salvador in 2 years In their Break-up "2013-2015").
- March 17 - Kirby de Jesus
- April 2 - Danita Paner, Filipina singer and actress
- April 3 – Gian Carlos, actor and TV Host
- April 10 - Dex Quindoza, actor
- April 21 – Marice Ice Martinez, broadcaster
- April 26 – Nikko Ramos, Filipino DJ of Magic 89.9 and presenter basketball of UAAP on S+A of ABS-CBN Sports.
- May 2 – Tina Marasigan, TV personality
- May 17 - Kris Bernal, actress
- May 27 - Yam Concepcion, Filipina actress
- May 31 - Ailyn Luna, former actress
- July 12 - Xian Lim (Born Alexander Xian Cruz Lim Uy), Chinese-Filipino actor, singer and host (The former Loveteam of Kim Chiu as "KimXi")
- July 20 - Rayver Cruz, Filipino actor and Dancer
- August 9 - Miko Raval (born Kevin Michael Raval), actor, basketball player and model
- August 18 - Nikki Bacolod, singer and actress
- August 21 - Marvin Barrameda, actor and Host
- August 22 - Chariz Solomon, actress
- September 21 - Jef Gaitan, actress
- September 27 - Robi Domingo, actor
- October 2 - Janine Gutierrez, actress
- November 5 – Enchong Dee (Born Ernest Lorenzo Velasquez-Dee) (Younger Brother of AJ Dee), actor and former De La Salle Green Archers swimmer
- November 6 - Shaina Magdayao, actress
- November 12 - Gino M. Santos, director and producer
- November 15 - Jona Viray, singer
- November 20 - Edgar Allan Guzman, actor
- November 21 - Ejay Falcon, (Born Ejay Lasap Falcon) (Big Win Placer of Pinoy Big Brother in 2008), actor and TV Host
- November 22 - Valerie Weigmann, actress, TV Host and Beauty Queen
- November 26 - Angeline Quinto, actress and singer
- December 11 - Sam Pinto, actress
- December 15 - Coraleen Waddell, actress and commercial model.
- December 26 - Jennica Garcia, actress

== See also ==
- 1989 in television
