= Johnedel Cardel =

Filipino basketball player and coach

Personal information
- Born: June 6, 1970 (age 56) Mandaluyong, Rizal, Philippines
- Listed height: 6 ft 1 in (1.85 m)
- Listed weight: 180 lb (82 kg)

Career information
- High school: JRC (Mandaluyong)
- College: De La Salle; San Sebastian
- PBA draft: 1993: 1st round, 6th overall pick
- Drafted by: Alaska Milkmen
- Playing career: 1993–2002
- Position: Shooting guard
- Coaching career: 2012–present

Career history

Playing
- 1993–1994: Alaska Milkmen
- 1995–1996: Sta. Lucia Realtors
- 1997: Formula Shell
- 1998–2001: Negros Slashers
- 2002: Olongapo Volunteers

Coaching
- 2012–2017: GlobalPort Batang Pier (assistant)
- 2016: GlobalPort Batang Pier
- 2018–2024: Columbian/Terrafirma Dyip
- 2025: Titan Ultra Giant Risers

Career highlights
- As player: PBA champion (1994 Governors'); 2× UAAP champion (1989, 1990); 6× PBL champion (1986 Founder's Cup, 1987 Maharlika Cup, 1988 Freedom Cup, 1989 Invitational Cup, 1989 Maharlika Cup, 1990 Maharlika Cup)

Johnedel Cardel (born June 6, 1970) is a Filipino former professional basketball player who was the former head coach of the Titan Ultra Giant Risers of the Philippine Basketball Association (PBA). He is also the former head coach of the Terrafirma Dyip. He also played in the Metropolitan Basketball Association.

== Collegiate / amateur career ==
Cardel first played for the Jose Rizal College Light Bombers in the NCAA during his high school days and was a reliever on the San Sebastian team in College. He became one of the more popular players playing for De La Salle Green Archers in the Ateneo-La Salle UAAP championship in 1988. Cardel was a member of the back-to-back UAAP champion De La Salle in 1989–1990.

He also saw action for the national team, first in the ABC 17-and-under team in Doha, Qatar, then he played for the RP Youth team in the ABC Youth cagefest in Manila in January 1989 and finally with the men's national team for the SEA Games and ABC Championships that same year.

Together with Green Archer teammate Jun Limpot, they played for Magnolia Ice Cream in the Philippine Basketball League and winning numerous championships.

== PBA / MBA career ==
Cardel turn pro in 1993 and was drafted by Alaska Milk as the sixth overall pick. He won one championship with Alaska in 1994 PBA Governors Cup. He moved to Sta. Lucia Realtors in the next two seasons before playing for Formula Shell in his final PBA year in 1997. He signed up with the Negros Slashers in the MBA in their inaugural season. Cardel helped the Slashers to three Southern Conference titles (1998, 2000 and 2001) but was unable to lead them to the overall MBA championship during his stay. In 2002 he signed up with the Olongapo Volunteers but was unable to finish the season due to the league shutdown.
