= 1993 PBA Commissioner's Cup finals =

Basketball tournament

Team	Coach	Wins
Swift Mighty Meaty Hotdogs	Yeng Guiao	4
Purefoods Oodles	Chot Reyes	2
- Dates: August 27 – September 7, 1993
- Television: Vintage Sports (PTV)
- Radio network: DZAM

PBA Commissioner's Cup finals chronology
- 1994 >

PBA finals chronology
- < 1993 All-Filipino 1993 Governors >

The 1993 PBA Commissioner's Cup finals was the best-of-7 championship series of the 1993 PBA Commissioner's Cup, and the conclusion of the conference playoffs. Corporate rivals Purefoods and Swift played in the finals for the second time in two years and for the 55th championship contested by the league.

Swift Mighty Meaty Hotdogs wins their second PBA title with a 4-2 series victory against the Purefoods Oodles.

== Qualification ==
Swift		Purefoods
Finished 9–2 (.818), 1st	Eliminations	Finished 8–3 (.727), 2nd
Finished 15–4 (.789), 1st	Semifinals	Finished 11–8 (.579), tied for 2nd
Finished 15–4 (.789), 1st	Playoff	Won against San Miguel, 119-101

== Series scoring summary ==
Team	Game 1	Game 2	Game 3	Game 4	Game 5	Game 6	Wins
Swift	100	92	102	112	112	108	4
Purefoods	93	117	92	102	134	99	2
Venue	Cuneta	Cuneta	Cuneta	Cuneta	Cuneta	Cuneta

== Games summary ==
=== Game 1 ===
Vintage

August 27

Swift Mighty Meaty Hotdogs 100, Purefoods Oodles 93
Scoring by quarter: 17-18, 27-15, 25-24, 31-36
Pts: Nelson Asaytono 23	Pts: Patrimonio 34 Grandison 33
Swift leads series, 1-0

Cuneta Astrodome, Pasay

Swift looks headed for a runaway victory when they led by 17 points, 80-63, halfway in the fourth quarter. Alvin Patrimonio ignited a rally for the Oodles, his three-point play off Ronnie Thompkins pull them within six at 81-87. Five straight points by Al Solis which started with a triple starved off the Oodles' rallies even as Patrimonio answered with his own triple to cut the lead of the Meaties again to six, 86-92. The Oodles failed to execute on their next play in a last attempt to close the gap.

=== Game 2 ===
Vintage

August 29

Swift Mighty Meaty Hotdogs 92, Purefoods Oodles 117
Pts: Ronnie Thompkins 33	Pts: Ronnie Grandison 32
Series tied, 1-1

Cuneta Astrodome, Pasay

In an amazing display of offensive power, Purefoods Oodles' hot-shooting and near-perfect field goal at the start of the fourth quarter blew the game wide open as they leads by as much as 29 points. Down 49-56 early in the third quarter, a 14-4 blast gave the Oodles a 63-60 lead, after a timeout by Swift and a basket, another run by Purefoods saw them led 79-65 after three quarters. Ronnie Thompkins open the fourth period with a basket but the Ooodles countered with a 12-0 bomb to put the game away, 91-67.

=== Game 3 ===
Vintage

August 31

Swift Mighty Meaty Hotdogs 102, Purefoods Oodles 92
Scoring by quarter: 32-14, 19-23, 22-25, 29-30
Pts: Ronnie Thompkins 38	Pts: Ronnie Grandison 30
Swift leads series, 2-1

Cuneta Astrodome, Pasay

Swift import Ronnie Thompkins went to work early as the Meaties surge to a 30-9 lead in the first quarter, the closest the Oodles came within was three, 77-80 in the fourth quarter. Al Solis' triple gave Swift an 85-78 lead and Ronnie Thompkins' follow-up dunk completed an 8-1 run to give them a 10-point advantage, 88-78.

=== Game 4 ===
Vintage

September 3

Swift Mighty Meaty Hotdogs 112, Purefoods Oodles 102
Scoring by quarter: 24-34, 24-15, 35-27, 29-26
Pts: Ronnie Thompkins 37
Swift leads series, 3-1

Cuneta Astrodome, Pasay

After uneventful first two quarters, Vergel Meneses took charge in the second half, a three-point play started a run that gave Swift an 83-74 lead with less than a minute remaining in the third quarter. The Meaties were up by 11 points in the final period, the last at 103-92 when an 8-0 blast by Purefoods with two triples put them to within three, 103-100, a series of miscues, hurried shots and errors by the Oodles resulted to Swift countering with a 7-0 run that ice the ballgame at 110-100.

=== Game 5 ===
Vintage

September 5

Swift Mighty Meaty Hotdogs 112, Purefoods Oodles 134
Pts: Ronnie Thompkins 47	Pts: Ronnie Grandison 37
Swift leads series, 3-2

Cuneta Astrodome, Pasay

From a 59-58 halftime score in favor of the Oodles, a basket by Swift turned out to be their last taste of the lead for the night, an 11-0 blast by the Oodles gave them a 10-point advantage. Purefoods went up by 21 points late in the third quarter, 98-77 on a three-point play by Ronnie Grandison. The Meaties came closest at 89-102 when Glenn Capacio converted on a triple as the Oodles scored on every opportunity to extend the series to a sixth game.

=== Game 6 ===
Vintage

September 7

Swift Mighty Meaty Hotdogs 108, Purefoods Oodles 99
Scoring by quarter: 26-24, 26-26, 27-25, 29-24
Pts: Ronnie Thompkins 42	Pts: Ronnie Grandison 26
Swift wins series, 4-2

Cuneta Astrodome, Pasay

The series-clinching win was a see-saw battle, it was close for the last time at 87-86 in favor of Swift. After a timeout, the Meaties scored six straight points for a 93-86 lead. Going into the final minutes with the score at 95-91 for Swift, Jerry Codinera was fouled and poked in the eye by Rudy Distrito. Affected by his vision, Codinera missed two crucial free throws. In a breakaway run, Rudy Distrito converted on a basket and a deliberate foul from Dindo Pumaren, who was also poked in the eye by Distrito. With a bonus free throw plus ball possession, the Meaties were up by seven and Nelson Asaytono scored on a follow-up to give them a 100-91 lead for good.

1993 PBA Commissioners Cup Champions

Swift Mighty Meaty Hotdogs
Second title

== Rosters ==
Swift Mighty Meaties roster
Players
Coaches

Pos.	No.	Nat.	Name	Ht.	Wt.
G	8	(Philippines)	Al Solis	5 ft 11 in (1.80 m)		Visayas
F	10	(Philippines)	Eric Reyes	6 ft 4 in (1.93 m)		Ateneo
F	11	(Philippines)	Nelson Asaytono	6 ft 3 in (1.91 m)		Manila
C	12	(Philippines)	Bonel Balingit	6 ft 9 in (2.06 m)		Visayas
F	13	(Philippines)	Elpidio Villamin	6 ft 2 in (1.88 m)
G	14	(Philippines)	Rudy Distrito	5 ft 11 in (1.80 m)		UE
G	15	(Philippines)	Juancho Estrada	5 ft 11 in (1.80 m)		Adamson
G	16	(Philippines)	Marcelino Albarillo	5 ft 10 in (1.78 m)		Mindanao
F	17	(Philippines)	Terry Saldaña	6 ft 3 in (1.91 m)		Letran
F	18	(Philippines)	Vergel Meneses	6 ft 3 in (1.91 m)		José Rizal
C	35	(Philippines)	Zaldy Realubit	6 ft 6 in (1.98 m)		USJ–R
F/C	44	(United States)	Ronnie Thompkins (I)	6 ft 5 in (1.96 m)		Fort Hays State
F	48	(Philippines)	Cadel Mosqueda	6 ft 3 in (1.91 m)		Arellano

Head coach

- (Philippines) Yeng Guiao

Assistant coach(es)

- (Philippines) Roehl Nadurata
- (Philippines) Bong Go

Legend

- (C) Team captain
- (I) Import
- Injured

Purefoods Oodles roster
Players
Coaches

Pos.	No.	Nat.	Name	Ht.	Wt.
F	5	(Philippines)	Abe King	6 ft 3 in (1.91 m)		San Beda
G	6	(Philippines)	Joey Guanio	6 ft 1 in (1.85 m)		UP Diliman
G	9	(Philippines)	Boy Cabahug	5 ft 11 in (1.80 m)		Visayas
G	10	(Philippines)	Dindo Pumaren	5 ft 9 in (1.75 m)		De La Salle
G	12	(Philippines)	Glenn Capacio	6 ft 1 in (1.85 m)		Far Eastern
C	14	(Philippines)	Kevin Ramas	6 ft 5 in (1.96 m)		Mapúa
F	15	(Philippines)	Dwight Lago	6 ft 3 in (1.91 m)		De La Salle
F	16	(Philippines)	Alvin Patrimonio	6 ft 3 in (1.91 m)		Mapúa
G	17	(Philippines)	Olsen Racela	5 ft 11 in (1.80 m)		Ateneo
F	18	(Philippines)	Benito Cheng	6 ft 3 in (1.91 m)		Mapúa
F	21	(United States)	Ronnie Grandison (I)	6 ft 5 in (1.96 m)		LSU New Orleans
G	22	(Philippines)	Frankie Lim	5 ft 11 in (1.80 m)		San Beda
C	44	(Philippines)	Jerry Codinera	6 ft 5 in (1.96 m)		UE

Head coach

- (Philippines) Chot Reyes

Assistant coach(es)

- (Philippines) Chito Narvasa

Legend

- (C) Team captain
- (I) Import
- Injured

== Broadcast notes ==
Game	Play-by-play	Analyst
Game 1		
Game 2		
Game 3		
Game 4	Jimmy Javier	Quinito Henson
Game 5		
Game 6		
