= 1993 PBA All-Filipino Cup finals =

Professional basketball competition

Team	Coach	Wins
Coney Island Ice Cream Stars	Chot Reyes	4
San Miguel Beermen	Norman Black	2
- Dates: May 7–18, 1993
- Television: Vintage Sports (PTV)
- Radio network: DZAM

Referees
- Game 2: B. Chua, L. Valera, V. Bartolome
- Game 3: E. de Leon, S. Cordero, V. De Dios
- Game 4: G. Ledesma, B. Chua, A. Bartolome
- Game 6: G. Ledesma, B. Chua, S. Coredro

PBA All-Filipino Cup finals chronology
- < 1992 1994 >

PBA finals chronology
- < 1992 Third 1993 Commissioner's >

The 1993 PBA All-Filipino Cup finals was the best-of-7 championship series of the 1993 Philippine Basketball Association All-Filipino Cup, and the conclusion of the conference playoffs. The San Miguel Beermen and Coney Island Ice Cream Stars played for the 54th championship contested by the league.

Coney Island Ice Cream Stars wins their third PBA title in a 4–2 series victory over the San Miguel Beermen.

== Qualification ==
San Miguel		Coney Island
Finished 8–2 (.800), 1st	Eliminations	Finished 6–4 (.600), tied for 2nd
Finished 10–4 (.714), tied for 1st	Quarterfinals	Finished 9–5 (.643), 2nd
defeated Sta. Lucia, 3–1	Semifinal round	defeated Swift, 3–0

== Series scoring summary ==
Team	Game 1	Game 2	Game 3	Game 4	Game 5	Game 6	Wins
Coney Island	90	104	94	96	91	99	4
San Miguel	100	95	88	95	106	96	2
Venue	Cuneta	Cuneta	Cuneta	Cuneta	Cuneta	Cuneta

== Games summary ==
=== Game 1 ===
Vintage

May 7

Coney Island Ice Cream Stars 90, San Miguel Beermen 100
Scoring by quarter: 31–28, 23–19, 18–24, 18–29
San Miguel leads series, 1–0

Cuneta Astrodome, Pasay

The Ice Cream Stars led by 13 points, 52–39 in the second quarter and settled for a 54–47 halftime lead. The Beermen opened the third quarter with eight straight points and grab the upper hand, 55–54. The Stars fought the Beermen throughout the fourth period until Allan Caidic buried a triple that broke an 83-all standoff and started an 11–2 run by San Miguel with Samboy Lim blocking Jerry Codinera's shot and Ato Agustin scoring underneath to give them a 94–85 lead. Coney Island coach Chot Reyes then pulled his starters in dismay.

=== Game 2 ===
Vintage

May 9

Coney Island Ice Cream Stars 104, San Miguel Beermen 95
Scoring by quarter: 17–18, 40–23, 24–35, 23–19
Pts: Alvin Patrimonio 21 Jerry Codiñera 21; Rebs: Jerry Codiñera 16; Asts: Frankie Lim 7	Pts: Samboy Lim 21; Rebs: Art dela Cruz 11; Asts: Ato Agustin 5
Series tied, 1–1

Cuneta Astrodome, Pasay
Referees: B. Chua, L. Valera, V. Bartolome

Coney Island raced to a 16-point lead at halftime, 57–41. The Beermen rallied to within a point, 84–85 in the final quarter, a jumper by Alvin Patrimonio and a tip-in by Abe King bailed the stars out of trouble with time down to 3:54, the Stars on top, 97–92. Abe King accounted for a crucial three offensive rebounds to snap whatever momentum the Beermen had.

=== Game 3 ===
Vintage

May 11

Coney Island Ice Cream Stars 94, San Miguel Beermen 88
Scoring by quarter: 17–17, 26–22, 34–28, 17–21
Pts: Alvin Patrimonio 29; Rebs: Alvin Patrimonio 11; Asts: Dindo Pumaren 8	Pts: Allan Caidic 29; Rebs: Alvin Teng 12; Asts: Samboy Lim, 2 others, 3
Coney Island leads series, 2–1

Cuneta Astrodome, Pasay
Referees: E. de Leon, S. Cordero, V. De Dios

Alvin Patrimonio scored 14 of his 29 points in the third quarter as the Stars opened leads of as many as 13 points, 75–62, Patrimonio teamed up with Jerry Codiñera and Glenn Capacio at endgame to repulse numerous rallies by the Beermen, which threatened for the last time at 85–88. Patrimonio single-handedly do it all for Coney Island and scored often on double or triple-teaming defense thrown at him and was unstoppable for the night.

=== Game 4 ===
Vintage

May 14

Coney Island Ice Cream Stars 96, San Miguel Beermen 95
Scoring by quarter: 19–23, 19–26, 33–24, 25–22
Pts: Alvin Patrimonio 37	Pts: Ramon Fernandez 18
Coney Island leads series, 3–1

Cuneta Astrodome, Pasay
Referees: G. Ledesma, B. Chua, A. Bartolome

San Miguel had their biggest lead at 64–48 when a 19–2 run by the Stars, behind Alvin Patrimonio, Boy Cabahug and Jerry Codinera, seized the upper hand for Coney Island at 67–66. In the final quarter, the Beermen were protecting a three-point edge, 95–92, when four straight points by the Stars with Alvin Patrimonio converting on the game's final basket with still two minutes left. Ramon Fernandez missed two crucial free throws and as time was winding down, Yves Dignadice forces a turnover on Patrimonio and a final possession for the Beermen, Ato Agustin missed on a side jumper as time expired.

=== Game 5 ===
Vintage

May 16

Coney Island Ice Cream Stars 91, San Miguel Beermen 106
Scoring by quarter: 17–19, 16–26, 30–27, 28–34
Pts: Alvin Patrimonio 20; Rebs: Alvin Patrimonio 15; Asts: Frankie Lim 5	Pts: Allan Caidic 31; Rebs: Dong Polistico 11; Asts: Ato Agustin 5
Coney Island leads series, 3–2

Cuneta Astrodome, Pasay

The Beermen went up by 15 points, 67–52 in the third quarter when the Stars came back again with a 9–0 run, ignited by a three-pointer from Boy Cabahug. Twice the Ice Cream Stars close to within six points, the last at 63–69, Samboy Lim hit a long three-pointer from midcourt as the buzzer sounded ending the third quarter for San Miguel at 72–63 and stopped the furious rally of Coney Island. The Beermen then scored seven straight points at the start of the fourth period and began pulling away.

=== Game 6 ===
Vintage

May 18

Coney Island Ice Cream Stars 99, San Miguel Beermen 96 (OT)
Scoring by quarter: 14–29, 26–16, 25–33, 25–12, Overtime: 9–6
Pts: Alvin Patrimonio 31; Rebs: Alvin Patrimonio 8	Pts: Allan Caidic 31; Rebs: Alvin Teng 10
Coney Island wins series, 4–2

Cuneta Astrodome, Pasay
Referees: G. Ledesma, B. Chua, S. Coredro

The Beermen took a huge 18-point lead, 27–9 in the first quarter, the Ice Cream Stars were able to cut the deficit down to four points, 35–39 in the second period but fell again in the third quarter as San Miguel looks set to extend the series into a seventh game after leading by 15 points, 84–69 in the fourth quarter, a 10–0 blast by Coney Island close the gap to within five, after Alvin Patrimonio's shot was nullified by the referee and Hector Calma of San Miguel completing a layup, Patrimonio orchestrated another 7–0 attack by the Stars to tie the count at 86-all. The game went into overtime at 90-all on Boy Cabahug's jumper with five seconds to go in regulation.

In the extension period, Patrimonio gave the Stars their first taste of the lead and Dindo Pumaren's fastbreak layup opened a four-point cushion, 98–94 with only 30 seconds left. The Beermen had a chance to tie again after converting two points and an error by the Stars but they failed to execute on the return play, Boy Cabahug was fouled with three seconds left, sinking his first charity but missed the second, the Beermen could not make a final attempt as time expired.

1993 PBA All-Filipino Cup Champions

Coney Island Ice Cream Stars
Third title

== Rosters ==
Coney Island Ice Cream Stars roster
Players

Pos.	#	POB	Name	Height	Weight	DOB (YYYY–MM–DD)	From
F	5	(Philippines)	Abe King	6 ft 3 in (1.91 m)			San Beda
G	6	(Philippines)	Joey Guanio	6 ft 1 in (1.85 m)			UP Diliman
F	8	(Philippines)	Freddie Abuda (injured)	6 ft 4 in (1.93 m)			Cebu
G	9	(Philippines)	Boy Cabahug	5 ft 11 in (1.80 m)			Visayas
G	10	(Philippines)	Dindo Pumaren	5 ft 9 in (1.75 m)			De La Salle
G	12	(Philippines)	Glenn Capacio	6 ft 1 in (1.85 m)			Far Eastern
C	14	(Philippines)	Kevin Ramas	6 ft 5 in (1.96 m)			Mapúa
F	15	(Philippines)	Dwight Lago	6 ft 3 in (1.91 m)			De La Salle
F	16	(Philippines)	Alvin Patrimonio	6 ft 3 in (1.91 m)			Mapúa
G	17	(Philippines)	Olsen Racela	5 ft 11 in (1.80 m)			Ateneo
F	18	(Philippines)	Benny Cheng	6 ft 3 in (1.91 m)			Mapúa
G	22	(Philippines)	Frankie Lim	5 ft 11 in (1.80 m)			San Beda
C	44	(Philippines)	Jerry Codinera	6 ft 5 in (1.96 m)			UE

Coaches

Head coach

- (Philippines) Chot Reyes

Assistant coach(es)

- (Philippines) Chito Narvasa

Legend

- (C) Team captain
- Injured

San Miguel Beermen roster
Players

Pos.	#	POB	Name	Height	Weight	DOB (YYYY–MM–DD)	From
G/F	1	(Philippines)	Bong Ravena	6 ft 1 in (1.85 m)			UE
G	5	(Philippines)	Franz Pumaren	5 ft 9 in (1.75 m)			De La Salle
G	6	(Philippines)	Ato Agustin	5 ft 11 in (1.80 m)			Lyceum
F	8	(Philippines)	Allan Caidic	6 ft 2 in (1.88 m)			UE
F	9	(Philippines)	Samboy Lim	6 ft 0 in (1.83 m)			Letran
F	10	(Philippines)	Alvin Teng	6 ft 4 in (1.93 m)			Arellano
G	11	(Philippines)	Biboy Ravanes	6 ft 0 in (1.83 m)			Cebu
F	12	(Philippines)	Yves Dignadice	6 ft 4 in (1.93 m)			STI WNU
G	14	(Philippines)	Hector Calma	5 ft 9 in (1.75 m)			Adamson
F	18	(Philippines)	Art Dela Cruz	6 ft 2 in (1.88 m)			San Sebastian
F/C	19	(Philippines)	Ramon Fernandez	6 ft 4 in (1.93 m)			San Carlos
C	20	(Philippines)	Adriano Polistico	6 ft 7 in (2.01 m)			Letran

Coaches

Head coach

- (United States) Norman Black

Assistant coach(es)

- (Philippines) Jong Uichico
- (Philippines) Filo Pumaren

Legend

- (C) Team captain
- Injured

== Broadcast notes ==
Game	Play-by-play	Analyst
Game 1	Sev Sarmenta	Andy Jao
Game 2	Ed Picson	Quinito Henson
Game 3	Sev Sarmenta	Andy Jao
Game 4	Sev Sarmenta	Quinito Henson
Game 5	Sev Sarmenta	Andy Jao
Game 6	Sev Sarmenta	Quinito Henson
