= 1994 PBA Commissioner's Cup finals =

Team	Coach	Wins
Purefoods TJ Hotdogs	Chot Reyes	4
Alaska Milkmen	Tim Cone	1
- Dates: August 30 – September 9, 1994
- Television: Vintage Sports (PTV)
- Radio network: DZRH

PBA Commissioner's Cup finals chronology
- < 1993 1995 >

PBA finals chronology
- < 1994 All-Filipino 1994 Governors' >

The 1994 PBA Commissioner's Cup finals was the best-of-7 championship series of the 1994 PBA Commissioner's Cup, and the conclusion of the conference playoffs. The Purefoods TJ Hotdogs and Alaska Milkmen played for the 58th championship contested by the league.

Purefoods Tender Juicy Hotdogs wins their 4th PBA title with a 4–1 series victory over the Alaska Milkmen.

== Qualification ==
Alaska		Purefoods
Finished 9–2 (.818), 1st	Eliminations	Finished 7–4 (.636), 2nd
Finished 14–5 (.737), 1st	Semifinals	Finished 13–6 (.684), 2nd

== Series scoring summary ==
Team	Game 1	Game 2	Game 3	Game 4	Game 5	Wins
Purefoods	97	84	92	90	94	4
Alaska	92	79	89	91	79	1
Venue	Cuneta	Cuneta	Cuneta	Cuneta	Cuneta

== Games summary ==
=== Game 1 ===
Vintage

August 30

Purefoods TJ Hotdogs 97, Alaska Milkmen 92
Pts: Kenny Redfield 37

Cuneta Astrodome, Pasay

=== Game 2 ===
Vintage

September 2

Purefoods TJ Hotdogs 84, Alaska Milkmen 79
Scoring by quarter: 20-22, 25-25, 20-26, 19-6
Pts: Kenny Redfield 27	Pts: Marques Bragg 25

Cuneta Astrodome, Pasay

Down by 12 points at least twice in the first three quarters, Purefoods limited Alaska to a record-low six points in the final period. The Milkmen were up, 73–65, starting the fourth quarter.

=== Game 3 ===
Vintage

September 4

Purefoods TJ Hotdogs 92, Alaska Milkmen 89
Scoring by quarter: 23-22, 26-19, 23-24, 20-24
Pts: Kenny Redfield 22	Pts: Marques Bragg 36

Cuneta Astrodome, Pasay

Purefoods held Alaska scoreless for more than two minutes while unleashing a 7–0 run. Kenny Redfield's triple late in the game dashed the Milkmen's hopes of pulling out their first victory in the series.

=== Game 4 ===
Vintage

September 6

Purefoods TJ Hotdogs 90, Alaska Milkmen 91
Scoring by quarter: 22-20, 16-31, 30-18, 22-22
Pts: Alvin Patrimonio 28	Pts: Marques Bragg 26

Cuneta Astrodome, Pasay

Glenn Capacio missed a game-tying free throw with 3.7 seconds left as Alaska averted a Purefoods' sweep with a one-point victory. The Milkmen grabbed their biggest lead in the third quarter at 60–45, but Capacio and Kenny Redfield, hitting from the three-point arc, led the Hotdogs' comeback to pull abreast at 84-all with 3:30 to go, the Milkmen scored six straight points to erect a 90–84 lead in the last 1:52. Alvin Patrimonio connected with his own trey and Redfield scored on a drive as the Hotdogs close to within a point, 89–90.

=== Game 5 ===
Vintage

September 9

Purefoods TJ Hotdogs 94, Alaska Milkmen 79
Scoring by quarter: 24-28, 29-21, 20-17, 21-13
Purefoods wins series, 4-1

Cuneta Astrodome, Pasay

Glenn Capacio sizzled hot in the fourth quarter, knocking in six straight points to capped an 11-2 Hotdogs' rampage that broke the game wide open at 88–75. Kenny Redfield started the breakaway with a triple from a 77-73 count in the middle of the final period.

1994 PBA Commissioners Cup Champions

Purefoods Tender Juicy Hotdogs
Fourth title

== Rosters ==
Purefoods Tender Juicy Hotdogs roster
Players

Pos.	#	POB	Name	Height	Weight	DOB (YYYY–MM–DD)	From
G/F	1	(Philippines)	Bong Ravena	6 ft 1 in (1.85 m)			UE
F	3	(United States)	Kenny Redfield (I)	6 ft 5 in (1.96 m)			Michigan State
F	6	(Philippines)	Abe King	6 ft 3 in (1.91 m)			San Beda
F	7	(Philippines)	Rey Evangelista	6 ft 3 in (1.91 m)			UST
F	8	(Philippines)	Freddie Abuda	6 ft 4 in (1.93 m)			Cebu
F	9	(Philippines)	Peter Naron	6 ft 3 in (1.91 m)			Visayas
G	11	(Philippines)	Richie Ticzon	5 ft 8 in (1.73 m)			Ateneo
G	12	(Philippines)	Glenn Capacio	6 ft 1 in (1.85 m)			Far Eastern
F	16	(Philippines)	Alvin Patrimonio	6 ft 3 in (1.91 m)			Mapúa
G	17	(Philippines)	Olsen Racela	5 ft 9 in (1.75 m)			Ateneo
G	22	(Philippines)	Frankie Lim	5 ft 11 in (1.80 m)			San Beda
G	25	(Philippines)	Vince Hizon	6 ft 2 in (1.88 m)			Ateneo
C	33	(Philippines)	Manny Victorino	6 ft 5 in (1.96 m)			José Rizal
C	44	(Philippines)	Jerry Codinera	6 ft 5 in (1.96 m)			UE

Coaches

Head coach

- (Philippines) Chot Reyes

Assistant coach(es)

- (Philippines) Chito Narvasa

Legend

- (C) Team captain
- (I) Import
- Injured

Alaska Milkmen roster
Players

Pos.	#	POB	Name	Height	Weight	DOB (YYYY–MM–DD)	From
G/F	4	(Philippines)	Merwin Castelo	6 ft 2 in (1.88 m)			San Beda
G	5	(Philippines)	Gilbert Reyes	5 ft 8 in (1.73 m)			Ateneo
G/F	6	(Philippines)	Jojo Lastimosa	6 ft 1 in (1.85 m)			USJ–R
G	7	(Philippines)	Roehl Gomez	6 ft 0 in (1.83 m)			Cebu
G/F	9	(Philippines)	Johnedel Cardel	6 ft 0 in (1.83 m)			De La Salle
C	12	(Philippines)	Dickie Bachmann	6 ft 5 in (1.96 m)			De La Salle
G	14	(Philippines)	Johnny Abarrientos	5 ft 8 in (1.73 m)			Far Eastern
F	16	(Philippines)	Bong Hawkins	6 ft 3 in (1.91 m)			UPHSD
C	24	(Philippines)	Cris Bolado	6 ft 7 in (2.01 m)			National-U
F	25	(United States)	Marques Bragg (I)	6 ft 5 in (1.96 m)			Providence
C	32	(Philippines)	Poch Juinio	6 ft 5 in (1.96 m)			UP Diliman
F	34	(Philippines)	Stevenson Solomon	6 ft 4 in (1.93 m)			San Sebastian
C	50	(Philippines)	Alex Araneta	6 ft 6 in (1.98 m)			Ateneo
F	54	(Philippines)	Dondon Ampalayo	6 ft 3 in (1.91 m)			USJ–R

Coaches

Head coach

- (United States) Tim Cone

Assistant coach(es)

- (Philippines) Joel Banal
- (Philippines) Aric del Rosario

Legend

- (C) Team captain
- (I) Import
- Injured

== Broadcast notes ==
Game	Play-by-play	Analyst
Game 1		
Game 2		
Game 3		
Game 4		
Game 5		
