= 1994 PBA All-Filipino Cup finals =

Basketball cup finals

Team	Coach	Wins
San Miguel Beermen	Norman Black	4
Coney Island Ice Cream Stars	Chot Reyes	2
- Dates: May 15–27, 1994
- Television: Vintage Sports (PTV)
- Radio network: DZRH

PBA All-Filipino Cup finals chronology
- < 1993 1995 >

PBA finals chronology
- < 1993 Governors 1994 Commissioner's >

The 1994 PBA All-Filipino Cup finals was the best-of-7 championship series of the 1994 PBA All-Filipino Cup, and the conclusion of the conference playoffs. The San Miguel Beermen and Coney Island Ice Cream Stars played for the 57th championship contested by the league. A trip to Hiroshima, Japan, for the Asian Games in September is at stake for the winner to represent the Country in basketball competition.

San Miguel Beermen won their 11th league crown and earn the right by winning against defending champion Coney Island Ice Cream Stars in six games, avenging their last season's All-Filipino Cup finals loss to this same team as the Beermen became the first back-to-back champions in the 1990s era.

== Qualification ==
San Miguel		Coney Island
Finished 8–2 (.800), 1st	Eliminations	Finished 7–3 (.700), 2nd
Finished 12–6 (.667), tied for 1st	Semifinals	Finished 12–6 (.667), tied for 1st
Finished 12–6 (.667), tied for 1st	Playoff	Won against Swift, 86–74

== Series scoring summary ==
Team	Game 1	Game 2	Game 3	Game 4	Game 5	Game 6	Wins
San Miguel	95	108	87	93	86	85	4
Coney Island	99	95	77	84	97	74	2
Venue	Cuneta	Cuneta	Cuneta	Cuneta	Cuneta	Cuneta

== Games summary ==
=== Game 1 ===
Vintage

May 15

San Miguel Beermen 95, Coney Island Ice Cream Stars 99
Scoring by quarter: 23–22, 30–22, 21–27, 21–28
Pts: Allan Caidic 41	Pts: Alvin Patrimonio 27
Coney Island leads series, 1–0

Cuneta Astrodome, Pasay

Rookie Richie Ticzon buried back-to-back triples in a 16–2 run by the Ice Cream Stars that erased a 78–71 San Miguel lead early in the fourth period to an 87–80 Coney Island advantage, Alvin Patrimonio and Jerry Codinera played well without relief in the second half, together with rookie Rey Evangelista, delivered the points, mostly within the shaded lane, Allan Caidic fired 41 points, seven triples with two four-point plays, except for Ato Agustin, the Beermen didn't get ample support from the rest of Caidic's teammates.

=== Game 2 ===
Vintage

May 17

San Miguel Beermen 108, Coney Island Ice Cream Stars 95
Pts: Allan Caidic 26
Series tied, 1–1

Cuneta Astrodome, Pasay

Allan Caidic scored 27 points and the Beermen, behind Yves Dignadice's 10 boards and Dong Polistico's clogging the lanes, held the upper hand in rebounds, 38–31, and predictably prevailed, a rotating double team was clamped on Alvin Patrimonio, while the rest of the Ice Cream Stars were hounded by the relentless defensive pressure applied by the Beermen.

=== Game 3 ===
Vintage

May 20

San Miguel Beermen 87, Coney Island Ice Cream Stars 77
Pts: Allan Caidic 29	Pts: Alvin Patrimonio 26
San Miguel leads series, 2–1

Cuneta Astrodome, Pasay

Coney Island was leading, 65–61 in the fourth period when the Beermen unleashed a 12–0 bomb as the Stars went scoreless in a long while, Allan Caidic and Ato Agustin hit with unerring accuracy, Caidic's trey gave San Miguel a 10-point advantage at 80–70.

=== Game 4 ===
Vintage

May 22

San Miguel Beermen 93, Coney Island Ice Cream Stars 84
Pts: Ato Agustin 21	Pts: Alvin Patrimonio 33
San Miguel leads series, 3–1

Cuneta Astrodome, Pasay

Trailing 69–72 entering the fourth quarter, the Beermen held Coney Island to only 12 points in the final period, with Allan Caidic and Ato Agustin again doing the scoring, both teams played rugged defense with many elbows, trippings, Alvin Patrimonio's face was badly hurt when he was hit by Ramon Fernandez' shoulder.

=== Game 5 ===
Vintage

May 24

San Miguel Beermen 86, Coney Island Ice Cream Stars 97
Pts: Allan Caidic 23	Pts: Alvin Patrimonio 22
San Miguel leads series, 3–2

Cuneta Astrodome, Pasay

Alvin Patrimonio poured all of his 22 points in the second half while Vince Hizon chipped in three triples that enable the Ice Cream Stars to pull away and extend the series.

=== Game 6 ===
Vintage

May 27

San Miguel Beermen 85, Coney Island Ice Cream Stars 74
Scoring by quarter: 23–18, 22–14, 19–23, 21–19
Pts: Allan Caidic 33	Pts: Alvin Patrimonio 24
San Miguel wins series, 4–2

Cuneta Astrodome, Pasay

San Miguel stormed quickly and established their biggest lead of 17 points, 39–22 in the second quarter. The Ice Cream Stars, from a 32–45 halftime deficit, threatened to within five points late in the third period at 50–55, but Ramon Fernandez anchored a 9–2 counterattack to give the Beermen a 64–52 lead. Allan Caidic's trey put San Miguel up by 11 at 69–58 in the fourth quarter, Yves Dignadice scored four crucial points at close range in the last four minutes for a 76–68 Beermen advantage. Alvin Patrimonio went hard for the basket to cut the deficit again to five points at 72–77. On San Miguel's possession, Alvin Teng was a recipient of a perfect pass and scored underneath for a safe 79–72 lead with less than two minutes left.

1994 PBA All-Filipino Cup Champions

San Miguel Beermen
11th title

== Rosters ==
San Miguel Beermen roster
Players

Pos.	#	POB	Name	Height	Weight	DOB (YYYY–MM–DD)	From
G	5	(Philippines)	Franz Pumaren	5 ft 9 in (1.75 m)			De La Salle
G	6	(Philippines)	Ato Agustin	5 ft 11 in (1.80 m)			Lyceum
F	8	(Philippines)	Allan Caidic	6 ft 2 in (1.88 m)			UE
F	10	(Philippines)	Alvin Teng	6 ft 4 in (1.93 m)			Arellano
G	11	(Philippines)	Biboy Ravanes	6 ft 0 in (1.83 m)			Cebu
F	12	(Philippines)	Yves Dignadice	6 ft 4 in (1.93 m)			STI WNU
G	14	(Philippines)	Hector Calma	5 ft 9 in (1.75 m)			Adamson
G	16	(Philippines)	Rudolf Belmonte	5 ft 11 in (1.80 m)			UST
C	17	(Philippines)	Kevin Ramas	6 ft 5 in (1.96 m)			Mapúa
F	18	(Philippines)	Art Dela Cruz	6 ft 2 in (1.88 m)			San Sebastian
F/C	19	(Philippines)	Ramon Fernandez	6 ft 4 in (1.93 m)			San Carlos
C	20	(Philippines)	Adriano Polistico	6 ft 7 in (2.01 m)			Letran

Coaches

Head coach

- (United States) Norman Black

Assistant coach(es)

- (Philippines) Pilo Pumaren
- (Philippines) Jong Uichico

Legend

- (C) Team captain
- Injured

Coney Island Ice Cream Stars roster
Players

Pos.	#	POB	Name	Height	Weight	DOB (YYYY–MM–DD)	From
G/F	1	(Philippines)	Bong Ravena	6 ft 1 in (1.85 m)			UE
F	7	(Philippines)	Rey Evangelista	6 ft 3 in (1.91 m)			UST
F	8	(Philippines)	Freddie Abuda	6 ft 4 in (1.93 m)			Cebu
F	9	(Philippines)	Peter Naron	6 ft 3 in (1.91 m)			Visayas
G	11	(Philippines)	Richie Ticzon	5 ft 8 in (1.73 m)			Ateneo
G	12	(Philippines)	Glenn Capacio	6 ft 1 in (1.85 m)			Far Eastern
F	16	(Philippines)	Alvin Patrimonio	6 ft 3 in (1.91 m)			Mapúa
G	17	(Philippines)	Olsen Racela	5 ft 11 in (1.80 m)			Ateneo
G	22	(Philippines)	Frankie Lim	5 ft 11 in (1.80 m)			San Beda
G	25	(Philippines)	Vince Hizon	6 ft 2 in (1.88 m)			Ateneo
C	33	(Philippines)	Manny Victorino	6 ft 5 in (1.96 m)			José Rizal
C	44	(Philippines)	Jerry Codinera	6 ft 5 in (1.96 m)			UE

Coaches

Head coach

- (Philippines) Chot Reyes

Assistant coach(es)

- (Philippines) Chito Narvasa

Legend

- (C) Team captain
- Injured

== Broadcast notes ==
Game	Play-by-play	Analyst
Game 1	Sev Sarmenta	Andy Jao
Game 2		
Game 3	Sev Sarmenta	Andy Jao
Game 4		
Game 5	Sev Sarmenta	Andy Jao
Game 6	Ed Picson	Quinito Henson
