= 1986 Philippine Amateur Basketball League season =

1986 PABL season
- Duration: May 3 – December 17, 1986
- Teams: 8
- TV partner: PTV
- Invitational champions: Lhuillier Jewelers
- Invitational runners-up: Hope Cigarettes
- Founder's Cup champions: Magnolia Ice Cream
- Founder's Cup runners-up: ESQ Marketing
- Filipino Cup champions: YCO Shine Masters
- Filipino Cup runners-up: ESQ-Sta. Lucia

Seasons
- ← 1985 1987 →

The 1986 PABL season is the fourth season of the Philippine Amateur Basketball League (PABL).

== Notable achievements ==
The ESQ Merchants, carrying the colors of Pasig Giants, won the Asian Inter-city basketball tournament in Jakarta, Indonesia, by lording over commercial squads from Brunei, Singapore, Tokyo, Kuala Lumpur and host Jakarta, they scored a clean six-game sweep and ending the South Korea's four-year dominance in the Asian intercity cagefest by downing the Tigers from Seoul, 104–101 in overtime. Former Arellano stalwart Jojo Martin was later adjudged Most Valuable Player. Among the other members of the team were Hernani Demigillo, Gerardo Ramos, Jerome Cueto, Joel Santos, Tony Dela Cerna and Edgar Macaraya, who took over the offensive chores vacated by Allan Caidic.

== Invitational Cup ==
The Invitational First Conference features commercial ballclubs and collegiate schools divided into two groups, barely a few weeks before the tournament started, teams started knocking on the PABL door as efforts to solicit team sponsorship rose to a fever pitch, the participating teams were down to only four, ESQ Marketing, RFM-Swifts, Mama's Love and newcomer Lhuillier Jewelers of Cebu when the league had a board meeting in early March. Last year's challenge the champions titlist Army Jungle Fighters of coach Charlie Badion and another new member Hope Cigarettes to be handled by Arturo Valenzona, came in as last minute entries. Two collegiate squads comprises the 8-team field in Division I, De La Salle University and the University of the Philippines, originally assigned to the second division but has been moved on the request of coach Joe Lipa and will play under the banner of Converse-Milkland.

Division II were consist of UE Warriors, UST Glowing Goldies, Ateneo Blue Eagles, San Sebastian College, Letran Knights, Perpetual Help College, University of Manila and NCBA.

Noteworthy among the players from their respective teams were Samboy Lim, Jojo Lastimosa, Al Solis, Jun Tan, Peter Aguilar, Peter Jao and Jesus Ramirez of Lhuillier. Allan Caidic, Edgar Macaraya, Jojo Villapando, Hernani Demigillo and Alvin Teng of ESQ Merchants. Zaldy Realubit and Yves Dignadice of Mama's Love. Renato Agustin, Glenn Capacio, Leo Isaac, Edgar Tanuan, Adriano Polistico and Jeffrey Graves of Hope. Ronnie Magsanoc, Duane Salvaterra and a 17-year-old rookie Benjie Paras of Converse/Milkland.

After a one-round eliminations, Lhuillier were unbeaten with seven straight wins, the Jewelers were joined by RFM-Swift's (tied with ESQ at 4–3) in the semifinals. ESQ Marketing and Hope Cigarettes made it by topping the quarterfinal round against the two other teams, La Salle and Army.

Lhuillier and Hope stood out in the semifinal round and will play in the best-of-five Division I championship. The Jewelers with assistant coach Alfredo Enriquez, a former PBA backcourt man, calling the shots from regular coach Raul "Yayoy" Alcoseba, who is serving a one-year suspension imposed on him by the Basketball Association of the Philippines (BAP) for leading University of San Jose-Recoletos' walkout during the National Students basketball championships last year in Naga City, won the finals series, 3 games to 1.

=== (Division I title) ===
Team	Game 1	Game 2	Game 3	Game 4	Wins
Lhuillier	86	104 OT	100	86	3
Hope	88	100	94	78	1
Venue	RMC	RMC	RMC	RMC

== Founder's Cup ==
ESQ Marketing, RFM-Swift's and Mama's Love were the only remaining teams from the Invitationals that will play in the PABL Second Conference called Founder's Cup. Three teams will make a comeback and they were Magnolia Ice Cream of coach Derrick Pumaren, formerly known as Lagelite Beermen in last season's Invitational tournament, the Country Fair Hotdogs of coach Larry Mumar, and Fuji Soy Sauce, both of which saw action in last year's Challenge the Champions. Purefoods Corporation, a giant food company, became the newest member to join the basketball scene, the Food Experts will be handled by former Masagana 99 mentor Domingo Panganiban.

Magnolia Ice Cream with a star-studded lineup composed of national team players Allan Caidic, Elmer Reyes and Jerry Codinera, swept all their six assignments in the eliminations, they were followed by ESQ Merchants with four wins and two losses and completing the semifinal cast were Mama's Love and Purefoods, which beat corporate rival RFM-Swift's on the last day of the elimination schedule, Fuji Soy Sauce were tied with Mama's Love and Purefoods with three wins and three losses each but were eliminated via quotient.

In the one-round semifinals, the Ice Cream Makers remained unbeaten and continue to dominate as they enter into the championship round along with ESQ Marketing. Magnolia scored a 3–0 sweep over the Hector Calma-led ESQ Merchants in the best-of-five finals series to complete a perfect 12-game tournament sweep.

Team	Game 1	Game 2	Game 3	Wins
Magnolia	103	90	76	3
ESQ	66	84	67	0
Venue	RMC	RMC	RMC

== Filipino Cup ==
The Third Conference known as "Filipino Cup" is dedicated to the countless brave souls who took part in the People Power Revolution, it opens on October 18 with the usual parade of competing teams with their muses and the giving of plaques of appreciation to members of the 1936 Berlin Olympics, 1951 Asian Games, 1954 World Basketball Championships, Gold medalists in the Seoul Asiad and the Philippine national team which took the bronze medal in the 10th Asian games.

The league marked the return of Crispa and YCO ballclubs to the amateur scene. Crispa combined forces with the Lhuillier quintet while YCO, the most dominant team in the 1950s and 1960s, decided to build its nucleus from the now-defunct Fuji Soy Sauce squad and has enlisted such players as Asian gamers Edgar Tanuan, Alvin Patrimonio and Eric Altamirano. Other teams with massive player transfers are Jojo Lastimosa and Harmon Codiñera seeing action for Crispa-Lhuillier, together with Peter Aguilar, Al Solis and new recruit Arthur Dela Cruz, San Sebastian's prized slotman in the NCAA. Magnolia had Allan Caidic, Nelson Asaytono, Jerry Codiñera, Dindo Pumaren, David Zamar and Benjie Gutierrez. Purefoods boasts of Cayetano Salazar of NCAA champion Letran, Salvador Ramos, George Ella and Loreto Manaog. RFM-Swift's were led by former Mama's love stalwart Elmer Cabahug, Anthony Mendoza, Alex Regis and former pro Jerry Pingoy. Nat Canson's ESQ Merchants, now known as ESQ-Sta. Lucia Realty, had Jojo Villapando, Tony Dela Cerna, Edgar Macaraya, Hernani Demegillo, former pro Lawrence Merced and slippery guard Jerry Gonzales. Newcomer Philips Sardines of national coach Joe Lipa had the UP Maroons tandem of Benjie Paras and Ronnie Magsanoc. Guest team Golden Dragon of Taiwan will see action in the semifinals.

The YCO Shine Masters, coach by Egay Gomez and led by Alvin Patrimonio, won the Filipino Cup title via 3–0 sweep over ESQ-Sta.Lucia. Crispa-Lhuillier takes third place with a 2–1 series win over Magnolia Ice Cream.

Team	Game 1	Game 2	Game 3	Wins
YCO	100	107	95	3
ESQ-Sta.Lucia	90	98	90	0
Venue	RMC	RMC	RMC
