= YCO Shine Masters =

- Leagues: PABL (1986-1987)
- Founded: 1986
- Location: Philippines
- Team colors: Red, green and white
- Head coach: Egay Gomez
- Championships: PABL (2): *1986 Filipino Cup; *1987 Freedom Cup

The YCO Shine Masters were a Philippine Basketball League (then known as the Philippine Amateur Basketball League (PABL) team that played for three conferences through the 1986 and 1987 seasons, winning two PABL titles. The ballclub was owned by the Elizalde Group of Companies, which also owned its predecessor team, the YCO Painters and the original Tanduay franchise in the PBA.

The Shine Masters became the first commercial team of Alvin Patrimonio. He appeared in a TV commercial endorsing the YCO Paint Product in 1986.

The Shine Masters formed a strong line-up in their three conference appearance. YCO won the 1986 PABL Third Conference Crown, known as Filipino Cup, at the expense of ESQ-Sta.Lucia Realty. Alvin Patrimonio was voted Conference MVP. Other players in that maiden lineup were Ato Agustin and Andy De Guzman. The following year, the Shine Masters would meet RFM-Swift Hotdogs twice for the championship, losing the first time when the Hotdogs benefited for getting top players like Jojo Lastimosa and Nelson Asaytono from eliminated teams. YCO gained a measure of revenge over RFM-Swift's the following conference via 3–0 sweep.

The team was disbanded ahead of the Tanduay team, brought about by the financial difficulties of its corporate parent. Afterwards, Patrimonio and teammate Glenn Capacio moved to RFM-Swift.

== List of YCO players ==
- Ato Agustin
- Eric Altamirano
- Josel Angeles
- Glenn Capacio
- Andy de Guzman
- Nandy Garcia
- Mar Anthony Magada
- Ronnie Magsanoc
- Loreto Manaog
- Jaime Mariquit
- Alvin Patrimonio
- Adriano Polistico
- Edgardo Roque Jr.
- Enerito Sebial
- Jack Tanuan
- Joel Valle
- Arturo Versoza Jr
- Jerome Capacio

== See also ==
- List of Philippine Basketball League champions
