= 1987 Philippine Amateur Basketball League season =

1987 PABL season
- Duration: March 7 – December 18, 1987
- Teams: 8 + 2
- Season MVP: Alvin Patrimonio
- International Invitational Cup champions: RFM-Swift Hotdogs
- International Invitational Cup runners-up: YCO Shine Masters
- Freedom Cup champions: YCO Shine Masters
- Freedom Cup runners-up: RFM-Swift Hotdogs
- Maharlika Cup champions: Magnolia Ice Cream
- Maharlika Cup runners-up: RFM-Swift Hotdogs

Seasons
- ← 1986 1988 →

The 1987 PABL season is the fifth season of the Philippine Amateur Basketball League (PABL).

== International Invitational Cup ==
Qualified for semifinals

Team Standings	Win	Loss	Coach
YCO Shine Masters	5	2	Edgardo Gomez
RFM-Swift Hotdogs	4	3	Yeng Guiao
Purefoods Food Masters	4	3	Domingo Panganiban
Philips Sardines	4	3	Joe Lipa
Magnolia Juice Drinks	4	3	Derrick Pumaren
Lhuillier-Converse	4	3	Raul Alcoseba
Sta. Lucia Realtors	2	5	Cholo Martin
Lady's Choice	1	6	Nic Jorge

The First Conference opens on March 7. The participating teams were Filipino Cup champion YCO Shine Masters, Magnolia Juice Drinks, RFM-Swifts, Lhuillier-Converse, Purefoods, Sta.Lucia Realty, Philips Sardines and newcomer Lady's Choice. The format is a one-round eliminations among eight teams with the top four making it to the semifinals at the end of preliminary round. YCO took the first semifinals berth with a 5-2 won-loss record, five other teams ended up with a 4-3 card. Purefoods, Philips and Swift Hotdogs made it to the next round by way of superior quotient over Magnolia and Lhuillier-Converse.

Three foreign clubs were guest teams seeded into the semifinal round, they are the Hyundai Motors of South Korea, led by hotshot Lee Chung Hee, Golden Dragon of Taiwan and the Pacific All-stars, a tall team featuring top American servicemen in the Asia-Pacific region. Local teams beef up their roster by adding reinforcements from the ousted squads. RFM-Swifts and YCO arranged a best-of-three championship showdown by topping the semifinal round with identical 5-1 won-loss slates, Philips Sardines (4-2) and Golden Dragon of Taiwan (3-3 in a tie with Hyundai) dispute third place honors, Purefoods was 1-5 and winless Clark (Pacific) All-stars at 0-6.

RFM-Swifts under coach Yeng Guiao, who called the shots for the hotdogs only for this tournament, won their first PABL title with a two-game sweep off YCO Shine Masters. Golden Dragon of Taiwan won third place via higher point difference following a victory over Philips that tied their series at one game apiece. Jojo Lastimosa of Lhuillier-Converse, who was a guest player of Swifts in the semifinals, won the Most Outstanding Local Player Award. Also cited as Most Outstanding Foreign Player was Korean Lee Chung Hee of Hyundai, he scored a tournament-high of 66 points in Hyundai's 110-111 loss to Philips Sardines on March 23.

April 3

boxscores

RFM-Swift Hotdogs 112, YCO Shine Masters 111

Rizal Memorial Coliseum, Manila

April 4

RFM-Swift Hotdogs 108, YCO Shine Masters 106
RFM-Swift's wins series, 2-0

Rizal Memorial Coliseum, Manila

=== International Invitational Cup Awards ===
- Most Outstanding Local Player: Jojo Lastimosa (RFM-Swift)
- Most Outstanding Foreign Player: Lee Chung-hee (Hyundai)

== Freedom Cup ==
Qualified for quarterfinals

Team Standings	Win	Loss	PCT
RFM-Swift Hotdogs	7	2	.778
Magnolia Juice Drinks	6	3	.667
YCO Shine Masters	5	4	.555
Lhuillier-Converse	5	4	.555
MIESCOR Builders	5	4	.555
Sta. Lucia Realtors	4	5	.444
Purefoods Food Masters	4	5	.444
Philips Sardines	3	6	.333
Mama's Love	3	6	.333
Lady's Choice	3	6	.333

The Second Conference called Freedom Cup started on May 16 at the ULTRA. Cebu-based Mama's Love and the newly formed MIESCOR Builders from Manila Electric Company, a power in major basketball in the early 1970s before Martial Law, joined the eight other ballclubs, raising the participating teams to 10. After the one-round eliminations, RFM-Swifts with new coach Chito Afable, were on top of the team standings with seven wins and two losses, followed by Magnolia Juice Drinks (6-3), national senior's champion Lhuillier-Converse, MIESCOR and YCO were all tied with five wins and four losses. Sta.Lucia and Purefoods dispute the last quarterfinals seat, the Realtors prevail over the Food Masters, 93-89 on June 8.

The six-team quarterfinal round had their carry-over records minus the results of their games against the other four teams eliminated. RFM-Swifts will have a 4-1 card, MIESCOR with three wins and two losses, Magnolia, Lhuillier, YCO and Sta. Lucia with two wins and three losses. Swifts and MIESCOR, both with six wins and four losses, makes it to the four-team semifinal round, along with YCO (tied with Magnolia and Sta. Lucia at 5-5 but made it via quotient system), Lhuillier-Converse were eliminated at 3-7. The Juice Drink Makers completed the cast with a 92-83 win over the Realtors in their playoff on June 24.

In the two-round semifinals, RFM-Swifts and YCO finish with identical 4-2 won-loss slates and will have a repeat title-clash. Magnolia (3-3) and MIESCOR (1-5) will play for third place. The YCO Shine Masters exact revenge over RFM-Swifts, which had no outside help this time, via 3-0 sweep in their best-of-five finals series. Magnolia won third place despite losing the third game against the Builders as they led their own series, two games to one.

July 6

boxscores

YCO Shine Masters 115, RFM-Swift Hotdogs 82

ULTRA, Pasig

July 8

boxscores

YCO Shine Masters 105, RFM-Swift Hotdogs 101

ULTRA, Pasig

July 10

YCO Shine Masters 86, RFM-Swift Hotdogs 81
YCO wins series, 3-0

ULTRA, Pasig

== Philippine Cup ==
A special tournament called Philippine Cup was held from August 3 to 10, featuring the Philippine men's national team, coach by Joe Lipa and sponsored by Philips Sardines, a PABL selection carrying the brand Rebisco, the US NCAA Selection sponsored by Swifts, Shanghai from China and a team from Egypt.

The US NCAA all-stars and the PABL-Philips played in the best-of-three finals following the nationals' 95-83 win over the Americans. Swift's-USA, PABL-Philips and Egypt ended the round with similar 3-1 slates but the Filipinos took the second finals slot over the Egyptians via a better FIBA goal average. Swift's-USA won the Philippine Cup title with a 2-1 series victory over PABL-Philips. After losing Game One in a fight-marred game, the Americans won the next two games by a big margin over the RP nationals.

August 8

Swift-USA All-Stars 81, PABL-Philips 83

Rizal Memorial Coliseum, Manila

August 9

boxscores

Swift-USA All-Stars 91, PABL-Philips 70

Rizal Memorial Coliseum, Manila

August 10

Swift-USA All-Stars 107, PABL-Philips 76
Swift's-USA wins series, 2-1

Rizal Memorial Coliseum, Manila

== Maharlika Cup ==
Qualified for outright semifinals

Team Standings	Win	Loss	PCT
Lhuillier-Converse	9	3	.750
RFM-Swift Hotdogs	8	4	.667
Magnolia Ice Cream	7	5	.583
Philips Sardines	6	6	.500
Sta. Lucia Realtors	5	7	.417
Purefoods Food Masters	5	7	.417
MIESCOR Builders	2	10	.250

Following the disbandment of YCO Shine Masters and Lady's Choice and with Mama's Love not taking part of the league's last offering of the season, seven teams were left to play in the Maharlika Cup which opens on October 10. After the two-round eliminations, the team standings were Lhuillier-Converse (9-3), Swift Hotdogs (8-4), Magnolia Ice Cream (7-5), Philips (6-6), Sta.Lucia and Purefoods (5-7), and MIESCOR (2-10).

The last four lower-seeded teams played in a two-round quarterfinals to determine three other semifinalists. Sta.Lucia finish with five wins and one loss, followed by MIESCOR with three wins and three losses, Philips and Purefoods, both with two wins and four losses, played in a sudden-death playoff on November 28, Philips won the match, 85-79.

Magnolia and Swift advances into the championship with a 4-1 won-loss record in the one-round semifinals. The rest of the standings were Lhuillier-Converse (3-2), Philips Sardines (2-3), Sta.Lucia and MIESCOR (1-4). Magnolia Ice Cream won their second league title with a 3-1 series win over RFM-Swift Hotdogs, which had new acquisitions Alvin Patrimonio and Glenn Capacio from the disbanded YCO ballclub. Lhuillier-Converse placed third with a similar 3-1 win over Philips Sardines in their own series.

December 11

boxscores

Magnolia Ice Cream 97, RFM-Swifts Hotdogs 84

Rizal Memorial Coliseum, Manila

December 14

boxscores

Magnolia Ice Cream 91, RFM-Swifts Hotdogs 95

Rizal Memorial Coliseum, Manila

December 16

boxscores

Magnolia Ice Cream 107, RFM-Swifts Hotdogs 95

Rizal Memorial Coliseum, Manila

December 18

Magnolia Ice Cream 108, RFM-Swifts Hotdogs 105
Magnolia wins series, 3-1

Rizal Memorial Coliseum, Manila

== Occurrences ==
Game One of the Philippine Cup Finals between the USA Selection (Swift) and the RP Men's National team (PABL-Philips) were triggered by a melee that spilled all over the court with only 30 seconds left in the ballgame, the nationals on top, 83-81, both benches emptied in a five-minute player fight with spectators joining the free-for-all. USA coach Jerry Webber call for a walkout and the nationals were awarded the win by forfeiture.

Game four of the Maharlika Cup finals between Magnolia and Swift was halted for 15 minutes and with only 1:52 left in the ballgame. The Hotdogs walkout because they felt short-changed by the game officials, irate fans pelted the hardcourt with debris and softdrink bottles, it took a while before Swift coach Arturo Valenzona and his boys were persuaded to finish the game.

== Individual awards ==
- Mythical First Team (Maharlika Cup):
- Jerry Codinera (Magnolia) (SCOOP's Most Outstanding Player)
- Alvin Patrimonio (RFM-Swift)
- Ato Agustin (RFM-Swift)
- Dindo Pumaren (Magnolia)
- Jojo Lastimosa (Lhuillier-Converse)
- Season's Most Valuable Player (MVP): Alvin Patrimonio (YCO/Swift)
- Mythical First Team:
- Alvin Patrimonio (YCO/Swift)
- Jerry Codinera (Magnolia)
- Glenn Capacio (YCO/Swift)
- Jojo Lastimosa (Lhuillier-Converse)
- Ronnie Magsanoc (YCO/Philips)
