= 1988 Philippine Amateur Basketball League season =

1988 PABL season
- Duration: March 19 – December 22, 1988
- Teams: 9
- TV partner: PTV
- Season MVP: Benjie Paras; Benjie Paras
- International Invitational Cup champions: RFM-Swift Hotdogs
- International Invitational Cup runners-up: Philips Sardines
- Freedom Cup champions: Magnolia Ice Cream
- Freedom Cup runners-up: Sta. Lucia Realtors
- Maharlika Cup champions: Philips Sardines
- Maharlika Cup runners-up: Magnolia Ice Cream

Seasons
- 1987 1989

The 1988 PABL season is the sixth season of the Philippine Amateur Basketball League (PABL).

== Notable achievements ==
The Swift-PABL selection won the 3rd Asian Interclub basketball tournament held in Jakarta, Indonesia from April 9–18. Among the teams who participated were Samsung Electronics of Korea, Pandan Jaya of Malaysia, Asaba Club of Indonesia, Liaoning of China, Armed Forces of Singapore, and Orthodox of Jordan. Swift-PABL, coached by Nat Canson, defeated title-favorite Liaoning of China, 84–69, in the finale to complete a seven-game sweep.

The players of the Swift-PABL selection were honored during the opening ceremonies of the International Invitational Cup semifinal round. Among those who received their plaques of recognition were Gilbert Reyes, Ric-Ric Marata, Ato Agustin, Paul Alvarez, Nelson Asaytono, Peter Aguilar and Hernani Demigillo.

== International Invitational Cup ==
Team Standings	Win	Loss	Coach
RFM-Swift Hotdogs	6	2	Arturo Valenzona
Philips Sardines	6	2	Joe Lipa
Sta. Lucia Realtors	5	3	Nat Canson
Mama's Love	5	3	Roberto Manalili
Magnolia Ice Cream	5	3	Derrick Pumaren
Purefoods Food Makers	3	5	Domingo Panganiban
Converse All-Stars	3	5	Jun Celis
Agfa Color Films	3	5	Eddie Reyes
AFPSLAI Troopers	0	8	

The season opens on March 19. PBA superstar Robert Jaworski and Representative Freddie Webb were the guest of honors in the opening ceremonies. The Prelims determined the top three local teams, National Open champion RFM-Swifts and Philips Sardines are tied with six wins and two losses. Sta.Lucia Realtors, Mama's Love and Magnolia Ice Cream were at second place with similar 5-3 won-loss cards. In a playoff game to determine the third outright semifinal seat, the Realtors drew bye, Mama's Love beat Magnolia, 85-73 on April 18, and on the following day on April 19, Sta.Lucia advances outright with a 93-91 win over Mama's Love.

The six remaining teams battle for the last two semifinal slots and at the end of the single round, Magnolia Ice Cream made it 5-0 while Purefoods took the last ticket at 4-1. In the penultimate day of the eliminations, Agfa Colors default its game against Converse because its head coach did not bother to read the new schedule handed to him. The Color Specialists protested the default and when the decision of the board was handed the next day, Agfa was squaring off with Purefoods and upon learning the protest was turned down, Agfa coach Eddie Reyes pulled out his first stringers to deliberately lose the game. Converse coach Jun Celis protested the action of Agfa, the All-Stars finish with three wins and two losses and had a chance to tie Purefoods had Agfa played its heart out.

Three seeded foreign teams participated in the semifinal round, Isuzu Motors of Japan, which had two 6-9 Americans; Ted Young and Dale Roberts, a sixth-round draftee of the Detroit Pistons in 1984, in the lineup. University of British Columbia representing Canada and Pelita Jaya of Indonesia, which had Daryl Smith and Gerardo Ramos as imports.

RFM-Swift's and Philips Sardines went on to play in the Best-of-three title series. The Hotdogs defeated the Sardine Masters, two games to one, winning the deciding third game in overtime, 99-93. Ricric Marata's jumper with 10 seconds left in regulation tied the count at 85-all and send the game into an extension period. Ric-Ric Marata and Alvin Patrimonio combined to spell the difference in the five-minute extension. Benjie Paras of Philips Sardines was named the tournament's reigning Most Valuable Player.

Team	Game 1 (May 5)	Game 2 (May 6)	Game 3 (May 7)	Wins
RFM-Swift's	83	88	99 OT	2
Philips	80	96	93	1
Venue	RMC	RMC	RMC

== Freedom Cup ==
Mama's Love decided not to participate in the second conference. The six teams which made it to the semifinal round were Philips Sardines, Agfa Colors and Converse, the three teams which topped the eliminations to make it outright, joining them were RFM-Swifts, Magnolia and Sta.Lucia. In a one-round semifinals, Magnolia clinch the first finals berth with a 4-1 won-loss card, routing Swifts, 117-95, in their last assignment. The Sta.Lucia Realtors, which won their first three semis outing, took the other seat and will play the Ice Cream Makers in the finals.

Sta.Lucia with new coach Nemie Villegas, replacing Nat Canson at the start of the Freedom Cup, won the first game of the title series, 96-80. The Ice Cream Makers, who haven't beaten the Realtors in all four previous meetings, took the second game, 111-107, to tie the series and send the championship to a winner-take-all match. In the third and final game, Magnolia escaped with an 87-86 victory over Sta.Lucia to capture their third PABL title in a 2-1 series victory.

Team	Game 1 (June 25)	Game 2 (June 27)	Game 3 (June 29)	Wins
Magnolia	80	111	87	2
Sta.Lucia	96	107	86	1
Venue	RMC	RMC	RMC

== Maharlika Cup ==
Team Standings	Win	Loss	Coach
RFM-Swift Hotdogs	6	1	Arturo Valenzona
Magnolia Ice Cream	5	2	Derrick Pumaren
Sta. Lucia Realtors	5	2	Nemie Villegas
Philips Sardines	3	4	Joe Lipa
CAC Power Blocks	3	4	Arleo Magtibay
Agfa Color Films	3	4	Edgardo Gomez
Burger City	2	5	Manuel Pineda
Silver Horizon	1	6	Romy Bacani

The third conference opens on October 15 at the Rizal Memorial Coliseum with newcomers Burger City, Silver Horizon and the returning Concrete Aggregates Corporation. During the opening rites, the Board decided to adopt the theme "Unity For Sports Development". The eight participating teams play a single-round prelims with the top four advancing to the semifinal round, the next four teams will be joined by Shakey's-Baguio and Marsman Estate Plantation of Davao in another single round to determined the last two teams qualifying in the semis. McDonald's of Taiwan is the lone guest foreign squad and will be seeded in the semifinals.

RFM-Swift Hotdogs were on top of the team standings after the eliminations with six wins and one loss, followed by Magnolia and Sta.Lucia, tied with five wins and two losses. Philips Sardines makes it outright with an 86-73 win against Concrete Aggregates in a playoff game on November 12.

In the next round, Concrete Aggregates withdrew because of a depleted line-up, leaving only five teams to dispute the last two slots. Shakey's-Baguio enters the semifinal round and Burger City completed the cast with a 73-72 playoff win over Agfa Color Films on December 1.

Magnolia Ice Cream and Philips Sardine Canners advances into the championship round with similar 5-1 won-loss record in the semifinals. Philips beat Magnolia, 93-83, on the last playing date on December 14 to close the door on the finals' hopes of McDonald's/Taipei. Philips Sardines won their first-ever PABL crown, blowing out defending champion Magnolia Ice Cream in the final half of a decisive 103-86 victory in Game three and a 2-1 series win. As expected, Benjie Paras of Philips was the runaway MVP winner.

Team	Game 1 (Dec 19)	Game 2 (Dec 20)	Game 3 (Dec 22)	Wins
Philips	96 OT	84	103	2
Magnolia	95	90	86	1
Venue	RMC	RMC	RMC

== Controversies ==
Five teams namely Purefoods, Agfa Colors, Converse, Philips Sardines and AFPSLAI troopers, tried to form a breakaway group during the months of July with a so-called National Amateur Basketball Association (NABA) as they were against the leadership of PABL chairman Joey Concepcion. BAP President Gonzalo "Lito" Puyat has spoken he cannot sanction the supposed new league.
