= 1988 PBA draft =

Player selection in Philippine basketball

General information
- Date: February 29, 1988

Overview
- League: Philippine Basketball Association
- First selection: Edgar Tanuan (Purefoods)

The 1988 Philippine Basketball Association (PBA) rookie draft was an event at which teams drafted players from the amateur ranks. The draft was held on February 29, 1988.

== Round 1 ==
Pick	Player	Country of origin*	PBA team	College
1	Jack Tanuan	Philippines	Purefoods Hotdogs	Far Eastern
2	Ronnie Magsanoc	Philippines	Shell Helix	UP Diliman
3	Anthony Poblador	Philippines	Ginebra San Miguel	De La Salle
4	Adriano Polistico	Philippines	Alaska Milk	Letran
5	Eric Altamirano	Philippines	Great Taste Instant Milk	UP Diliman

== Round 2 ==
Pick	Player	Country of origin*	PBA team	College
1	Joel Santos	Philippines	Purefoods Hotdogs	San Beda
2	Aurelio Jalmasco	Philippines	Shell Helix	FEATI
3	Reynaldo Yncierto	Philippines	Alaska Milk	Cebu Central
4	Demetrio Antonio	Philippines	Shell Helix	

== Undrafted players ==
- Leoncio Tan, Jr
- Joseph Uichico

== Direct-hire rookies ==
The PBA's newest ballclub Purefoods Hotdogs signed Glenn Capacio from FEU, Jerry Codiñera from UE, Jojo Lastimosa from San Jose-Recoletos and Alvin Patrimonio from Mapua as direct rookie free agents.
