= Jack Tanuan =

Filipino basketball player

Personal information
- Born: July 23, 1965 Davao City, Philippines
- Died: April 4, 2002 (aged 36) Quezon City, Philippines
- Listed height: 6 ft 5 in (1.96 m)
- Listed weight: 215 lb (98 kg)

Career information
- College: FEU
- PBA draft: 1988: 1st round1st overall
- Drafted by: Purefoods Hotdogs
- Playing career: 1988–2000
- Position: Power forward / center
- Number: 14, 41

Career history
- 1988–1991: Purefoods Hotdogs
- 1991–1993: Diet Sarsi/Swift Mighty Meaties
- 1993–1994: Sta. Lucia Realtors
- 1995: Purefoods Tender Juicy Hotdogs
- 1996: Mobiline Cellulars
- 1997: Pop Cola Bottlers
- 1997: Alaska Milkmen
- 1998–2000: Negros Slashers
Medals
Men's basketball
Representing Philippines
Asian Games
Bronze medal – third place	1986 Seoul	Team

Edgardo "Jack" Tanuan (July 23, 1965 – April 4, 2002) was a Filipino professional basketball player in the Philippine Basketball Association (PBA).

== College / Amateur career ==
Tanuan played college basketball at Far Eastern University in the UAAP. In the Philippine Amateur Basketball League, Jack saw action for Hope Cigarettes, YCO Shine Masters and MIESCOR. He was part of the Philippine national team that took home the bronze medal during the 1986 Asian Games in Seoul, Korea.

== Professional career ==
He was drafted first overall by newcomer Purefoods Hotdogs in the 1988 PBA draft. He primarily served as backup to Ramon Fernandez and Jerry Codiñera in his rookie year. Under coach Baby Dalupan, Big Jack was a revelation in the 1990 All-Filipino Conference but still could not find his place with Purefoods, averaging only nine minutes per game.

Midway in the first conference of the 1991 PBA season, Tanuan was lured away by Swift Mighty Meaties from Purefoods through the offer sheet. His scoring average increased from 3.8 points per game to 11.6 an outing with Swift. Before the start of the second conference of the 1993 PBA season, Tanuan was traded by Swift to Sta.Lucia Realtors for Zaldy Realubit.

Jack played back-up to Jun Limpot at Sta.Lucia. He returned to Purefoods Hotdogs in 1995 and became a journeyman in the next two seasons, playing for Pepsi/Mobiline and returning as well with Pop Cola. Tanuan was traded in late-1997 to Alaska Milkmen, along with Kenneth Duremdes, and he won his last PBA title with the Milkmen in the 1997 PBA Governors Cup.

He later moved to the newly formed league MBA via the Negros Slashers.

== Illness and death ==
Tanuan succumbed to a lingering kidney ailment on April 4, 2002. He had been in and out of the hospital for some time and was last confined at the New Era Hospital in Quezon City, battling a kidney disease that ended his career in 2000.
