= 1989 in German television =

This is a list of German television related events from 1989.

== Events ==
- 31 March - Nino de Angelo is selected to represent Germany at the 1989 Eurovision Song Contest with his song "Flieger". He is selected to be the thirty-fourth German Eurovision entry during Ein Lied für Lausanne held at the German Theatre in Munich.
- 9 November - ZDF's heute and ARD's Tagesschau, both widely viewed across East Germany, broadcast news of the impending fall of the Berlin Wall.

== Debuts ==
=== Domestic ===
- 4 January - Peter Strohm (1989–1996) (ARD)
- 12 March - Molle mit Korn (1989) (ARD)
- 30 March - Rivalen der Rennbahn (1989) (ZDF)
- 11 April - Forsthaus Falkenau (1989–2013) (ZDF)
- 12 November - Die schnelle Gerdi, first season (1989) (ZDF)

=== International ===
- 31 March - (United States) The Real Ghostbusters (1986–1991) (Sat. 1)
- 8 April - (United States) DuckTales (1987–1990) (Das Erste)
- 30 April - (United States) Ghostbusters (1986) (Tele 5)
- 14 May - (United States) BraveStarr (1987–1988) (Tele 5)
- 27 August - (Netherlands) The Bluffers (1986) (Tele 5)
- 9 October - (Australia) Neighbours (1985–present) (Sat. 1)
- 22 November - (United Kingdom) Doctor Who (1963-1989, 2005–present) (RTL Television)

=== Armed Forces Network ===
- (United States) Shining Time Station (1989-1993, 1995)

=== BFBS ===
- 8 February - (United Kingdom) Round the Bend (1989–1991)
- 1 March - (United Kingdom) Press Gang (1989–1993)
- 13 April - (United Kingdom) Mike and Angelo (1989–2000)
- 13 April - (United Kingdom) Children's Ward (1989–2000)
- 14 April - (United Kingdom) Woof! (1989–1997)
- 26 April - (United Kingdom) TUGS (1989)
- 28 April - (United Kingdom) Windfalls (1989)
- 28 May - (United Kingdom) The Beiderbecke Connection (1988)
- 29 May - (United Kingdom) / (Australia) The Heroes (1989)
- 1 June - (United Kingdom) Grim Tales (1989–1991)
- 29 September - (United Kingdom) / (United States) The Ghost of Faffner Hall (1989)
- 2 October - (United Kingdom) Bodger & Badger (1989–1999)
- 30 October - (United Kingdom) Bangers and Mash (1989)
- 30 November - (United Kingdom) The Riddlers (1989–1998)
- (United Kingdom) Barney (1988–1989)
- (Australia) Home and Away (1988–present)
- (United Kingdom) Huxley Pig (1989–1990)
- (United Kingdom) When Will I Be Famous? (1989)

== Television shows ==
=== 1950s ===
- Tagesschau (1952–present)

=== 1960s ===
- heute (1963-present)

=== 1970s ===
- heute-journal (1978-present)
- Tagesthemen (1978-present)

=== 1980s ===
- Wetten, dass..? (1981-2014)
- Lindenstraße (1985–present)

== Networks and services ==
=== Launches ===
Network	Type	Launch date	Notes	Source
ProSieben	Cable television	1 January		
Eurosport 1	Cable television	5 February		

=== Conversions and rebrandings ===
Old network name	New network name	Type	Conversion Date	Notes	Source
Nord 3	N3	Cable television	Unknown		

== Deaths ==
Date	Name	Age	Cinematic Credibility
11 January	Wolfgang Mascher	41	German actor
