= RFM-Swift Hotdogs =

RFM-Swift's
- Leagues: PABL/PBL (1983-1996)
- Founded: 1983
- Location: Philippines
- Team colors: Red, blue and white
- Head coach: Jun Noel; Virgil Villavicencio; Yeng Guiao; Boy Afable; Arturo Valenzona; Roehl Nadurata; Alfredo Amador
- Championships: PABL (3): *1987 International Invitational Cup; *1988 International Invitational Cup; *1989 Freedom Cup

RFM-Swift Hotdogs is a former basketball team of the now defunct Philippine Basketball League in which the ballclub played in the league's inaugural season in 1983 until the disbandment of the franchise in 1996. The company, Republic Flour Mills (RFM), through owner and then PABL chairman Joey Concepcion III, is known to be supportive of amateur basketball and sponsoring the national team during the late-1980s.

RFM won three PABL championships from 1987 to 1989, first with coach Yeng Guiao and with borrowed players Jojo Lastimosa and Peter Aguilar from Converse-Lhuillier and Nelson Asaytono from Magnolia, reinforcing the squad. The team won their first championship in the 1987 First Conference. The Hotdogs retain the crown the following season, this time under coach Arturo Valenzona and with Alvin Patrimonio as their franchise player, winning his last amateur title. RFM-Swift's has also won the National Open title in March of that year.

In the 1989 PABL Second Conference called Freedom Cup, RFM known as Swift Squeeze Juice Drinks with coach Yeng Guiao returning from the bench, won their third title behind the likes of Eugene Quilban, Vergel Meneses, Andy De Guzman and Bong Ravena.

Most of the PBA stars have played for RFM-Swift's in the PABL, including PBA greats Alvin Patrimonio, Ato Agustin and Vergel Meneses. When the company decided to make its entry into the pro league as one of the expansion franchise in 1990. The amateur team was retained but the once powerhouse and glamour ballclub somewhat lost its luster in the 1990s era. They used team names such as Sarsi, Pop Cola, New Pop Cola, Rica Hotdogs and Carol-Anns and didn't figure in a championship berth.

== Players who won a title with Swift ==
Players	1987 International Invitational	1988 International Invitational	1989 Freedom Cup
Peter Aguilar	✓	✓	
Renato Agustin	✓	✓	
Demetrio Antonio	✓		
Nelson Asaytono	✓		
Junel Baculi	✓		
Richard Bognot	✓	✓	✓
Elmer Cabahug	✓	✓	
Jerome Cueto	✓	✓	✓
Alejandro de Guzman			✓
Menardo Jubinal	✓		
Jojo Lastimosa	✓		
Romeo Lopez	✓		
Loreto Manaog		✓	
Ricardo Marata	✓	✓	
Richard Mendoza	✓		
Vergel Meneses			✓
Cadel Mosqueda	✓	✓	✓
Victor Pablo		✓	
Alvin Patrimonio		✓	
Joseph Pelaez	✓	✓	
Eugene Quilban			✓
Bong Ravena			✓
Zaldy Realubit	✓	✓	
Alex Regis	✓		
Django Rivera			✓
Melchor Teves			✓
Teofano Tiu			✓
Ariel Tizon	✓		✓
Ferdinand Santos			✓
Reynaldo Yncierto		✓	

== See also ==
- List of Philippine Basketball League champions
