= Molle mit Korn =

- Country of origin: Germany

Molle mit Korn is a German television series.

== See also ==
- List of German television series
