= Dong Polistico =

Filipino retired basketball player

Personal information
- Born: April 8, 1967
- Died: August 10, 2022 (aged 55) Governor Generoso, Davao Oriental
- Listed height: 6 ft 7 in (2.01 m)
- Listed weight: 230 lb (104 kg)

Career information
- College: Letran
- PBA draft: 1989: 1st round, 4th overall pick
- Drafted by: Alaska Air Force
- Playing career: 1989–1997
- Position: Center
- Number: 10, 20

Career history
- 1989–1992: Alaska Milkmen
- 1993–1997: San Miguel Beermen

Career highlights
- 2× PBA champion (1991 Third Conference, 1994 All-Filipino; NCAA seniors champion (1984)

Adriano "Dong" Polistico (April 8, 1967 – August 10, 2022) was a Filipino basketball player. While playing professionally, he was known for being an enforcer in defense.

== Playing career ==
A Letran Knight and an NCAA champion in 1984, Polistico was drafted by Alaska Air Force in the 1989, and played for the team until 1992.

In 1993, he started played for San Miguel Beermen under Norman Black. In 1994, when they won the All-Filipino title, the Beermen was tasked to represent the Philippines at 1994 Asian Games basketball, but lost to host Japan on bronze medal game. He played for Beermen until 1997.

== Personal life ==
Polistico died on August 10, 2022, due to heart attack at Governor Generoso, Davao Oriental.
