= Ric-Ric Marata =

Filipino basketball player

Ricardo "Ric-Ric" Marata
Personal information
- Born: December 21, 1964 Alamada, Cotabato, Philippines
- Died: April 17, 2010 (aged 45) New York City, New York, U.S.
- Listed height: 5 ft 7 in (1.70 m)
- Listed weight: 145 lb (66 kg)

Career information
- College: SWU
- PBA draft: 1989: 2nd round, 10th overall pick
- Drafted by: Alaska Air Force
- Playing career: 1989–1997
- Position: Point guard

Career history
- 1989–1990: Alaska Air Force
- 1991–1993: Diet Sarsi Sizzlers/Swift Mighty Meaties
- 1993: Sta. Lucia Realtors
- 1994: Shell Rimula X
- 1995–1997: Sunkist Orange Juicers/Pop Cola Bottlers

Career highlights
- PBA All-Star (1990)

Ricardo "Ric-Ric" Marata (December 21, 1964 – April 17, 2010) was a Filipino former professional basketball player in the Philippine Basketball Association (PBA).

== Basketball career ==
Ric-ric played three years for Southwestern University under coach Bobby Inoferio and was discovered by the Cebu ballclub Mama's Love. After four years of playing in the PABL and winning two championships with RFM-Swift Hotdogs, Marata turn pro in 1989 and was drafted by the Alaska Milkmen, together with his long-time backcourt partner Boy Cabahug. Ric-ric plays back-up point guard to Frankie Lim at Alaska for two seasons.

He was acquired by Diet Sarsi, his former amateur ballclub, in a pre-season trade in 1991, he won one championship with the RFM franchise before being shipped to Sta.Lucia Realtors beginning the second conference of the 1993 PBA season. As a Realtor, Marata got his break during the Governors Cup semifinals when starter Gerald Esplana was unable to complete the season due to an injury. Marata was surprisingly dropped by Sta. Lucia at the end of the season.

After another forgettable season, this time with Shell in 1994 where he lasted two conferences with the Turbo Chargers as reliever to Ronnie Magsanoc, Ric-ric got his third tour of duty with the RFM ballclub now named Sunkist Orange Juicers, he won two straight championships with the team. He stayed on for two seasons and played alongside his brother Romulo Marata in his final year in the PBA. Ric-ric found no takers by the end of the 1997 PBA season.

Marata played a total of nine seasons and averaged 6.8 points, 2.9 assists, 1.7 rebounds and 0.96 steals over 397 career games.

== Personal life ==
He is the fifth of eleven kids by parents Nehemias Marata and Aning Rilosas. He is the uncle of present PBA star Cyrus Baguio.

== Death ==
In the early morning of April 17, 2010 in New York, Marata died due to complications from intestinal surgery. He is survived by wife Chato and children Ricardo Jr., Janika and Nikko.
