= Superstar (Philippine TV program) =

- Also known as: Superstar: The Legend (1989–1990); Superstar: Beyond Time (1994–1995)
- Genre: Musical variety show
- Created by: Radio Philippines Network
- Presented by: Nora Aunor
- Country of origin: Philippines
- Original languages: Filipino, English

Production
- Production locations: Live Studio 2, RPN Studio, Broadcast City, Quezon City
- Running time: 90 minutes

Original release
- Network: RPN; IBC
- Release: 1970 – October 1, 1989

Superstar is a Philippine television variety show broadcast by RPN and IBC. Hosted by Nora Aunor, it aired from 1970 to October 1, 1989 and was the longest-running musical variety show on Philippine primetime television, airing for 22 years.

== Hosts ==
=== Main Host ===
- Nora Aunor†

=== Co-hosts ===
- German Moreno† (1975–1989)
- Cherie Gil† (1984–1989)
- Jaclyn Jose† (1987–1989)
- Susan Africa (1987—1989)
- Jograd de la Torre (1987–1989)

== Critical response ==
In 1987, Henry C. Tejero of the Manila Standard named the series as the best musical variety show of 1987, stating that over the years, the series became "a compendium of musical and visual styles in local television. Superstar is the chronicle of Aunor's rise and fall and ultimate apotheosis as The Phenomenon."

== See also ==
- Radio Philippines Network
- Nora Aunor
- List of programs previously broadcast by Radio Philippines Network
