= Egay Gomez =

Filipino basketball player and coach

Personal information
- Born: August 14, 1942
- Died: October 15, 2015 (aged 73)

Career information
- College: JRC
- Playing career: 1966–1977
- Coaching career: 1989–1996

Career history

Playing
- 1966–1975: YCO Painters
- 1975–1976: U/Tex Wranglers
- 1977: YCO Painters

Coaching
- 1986–1987: YCO Painters
- 1987: Tanduay Rhum Makers (assistant)
- 1989–1996: JRC

Career highlights
- As player: NCAA champion (1963, 1964)

Edgardo "Egay" Gomez (August 14, 1942 – October 31, 2015) was a Filipino basketball player and coach.

== Playing career ==
Gomez played basketball for Jose Rizal College (JRC, now Jose Rizal University or JRU) in the National Collegiate Athletic Association (Philippines) (NCAA), first as a high schooler in the juniors' division, then as a college student in the seniors' division. In high school, He played for JRC Light Bombers from 1960 to 1962; he scored 42 points in one game as a high schooler. After two years in the junior ranks, he spent three seasons with JRC's college team, the JRC Heavy Bombers. Egay teamed up with Rene Canent and his school was the NCAA champion in 1963 and 1964.

He played as forward-center. He is best remembered as “Go-Go-Gomez”, named by broadcaster Willie Hernandez in the 1960s.

From 1966 to 1975, Egay played for the YCO Painters. At the start of the Philippine Basketball Association (PBA), he played for two years with the U-Tex Wranglers and spent his last season playing for San Miguel (then known as Royal Tru-Orange) in 1977.

== Coaching career ==
Egay coached teams that included the Trinity Stallions and Jose Rizal College in the NCAA. When the YCO ballclub decided to return to basketball in the Philippine Amateur Basketball League in 1986, Egay became the coach of his former team. He coached the Shine Masters to two PABL titles and later on became assistant coach to Ely Capacio for Tanduay in the PBA during the final conference of the Elizalde ballclub.
