= 1989 Philippine Amateur Basketball League season =

1989 PABL season
- Duration: March 26 – December 23, 1989
- Teams: 7 + 3
- TV partner: PTV
- Season MVP: Peter Jao
- Invitational Cup champions: Magnolia Ice Cream
- Invitational Cup runners-up: Sta. Lucia Realtors
- Freedom Cup champions: Swift Squeeze Juice Drinks
- Freedom Cup runners-up: Sta.Lucia Realtors
- Maharlika Cup champions: Magnolia Ice Cream
- Maharlika Cup runners-up: Sta. Lucia Realtors

Seasons
- ← 1988 1990 →

The 1989 PABL season is the 7th season of the Philippine Amateur Basketball League (PABL).

== Invitational Cup ==
The first conference opens on March 26. The participating teams were defending champion Swift Squeeze Juice Drinks, National seniors champion Magnolia Ice Cream, Sta.Lucia Realtors, Philips Sardines, Agfa Color Films, Burger City and the storied Crispa Redmanizers, who were making a comeback from the basketball scene after a five-year absence.

Three teams played as guest squads; El Rancho Meat Loaf of Cebu, composed of a selection from the Visayas, Asia Overseas Transport and Dansei Groom Shop.

Qualified for semifinals

Team Standings	Win	Loss	PCT
Magnolia Ice Cream	9	0	1.000
Swift Squeeze	6	3	.667
Crispa Redmanizers	6	3	.667
Philips Sardines	5	4	.555
Burger City	5	4	.555
Sta.Lucia Realtors	4	5	.444
Asia Overseas Transport	4	5	.444
Agfa Color Films	3	6	.333
El Rancho	2	7	.222
Dansei Groom Shop	1	8	.111

Magnolia swept the eliminations with a perfect 9-0 won-loss card, followed by Crispa and Swift Squeeze with six wins and three losses, Burger City and Philips with five wins and four losses, and Sta.Lucia and Asia Overseas Transport at four wins and five losses. Seven teams enter the semifinal round and were joined by the seeded Tera Electronics of Taipei, the lone foreign squad.

The Sta.Lucia Realtors surprisingly advances first in the best-of-three finals series. Magnolia Ice Cream Makers struggled early in the semifinals and had to beat Crispa Redmanizers in the sudden-death playoff that decoded the second finalist. Magnolia completed a two-game sweep over Sta.Lucia to win their fourth PABL title. Crispa finished a strong third place via similar two-game sweep over Burger City in their inaugural PABL conference.

May 15

Magnolia Ice Cream 76, Sta. Lucia Realtors 70

Ninoy Aquino Stadium, Manila

May 19

Magnolia Ice Cream 105, Sta. Lucia Realtors 96
Magnolia wins series, 2-0

Ninoy Aquino Stadium, Manila

== Freedom Cup ==
Qualified for semifinals

Team Standings	Win	Loss	PCT
Burger City	7	2	.778
Sta.Lucia Realtors	7	2	.778
Swift Squeeze	6	3	.667
Philips Sardines	6	3	.667
Crispa Redmanizers	6	3	.667
Magnolia Ice Cream	5	4	.555
Pampanga All-Stars	3	6	.333
Marsman-Davao	3	6	.333
Agfa Color Films	2	7	.222
United Bicolanos	0	9	.000

Three guest squads once again joined the seven regular members, these are the Pampanga Selection, United Bicolanos and Marsman of Davao. Six teams makes it to the semifinal round, Burger City and Sta.Lucia were tied on top with a 7-2 won-loss slates, Swifts, Philips and Crispa were a game behind at six wins and three losses, Magnolia takes the 6th and last slot with five wins and four losses.

The one-round semifinals saw three teams; Sta.Lucia, Swift and Magnolia finished with identical 4-1 won-loss slates. Sta.Lucia makes it to the finals via higher quotient. Swift Squeeze and Magnolia battled in a playoff on July 10 and the Juice Drinks won, 116–99, to face the Realtors for the championship.

Swift Squeeze Juice Drinks, behind the likes of Vergel Meneses, Eugene Quilban, Andy De Guzman and national youth standout Bong Ravena, frustrated Sta.Lucia Realty in the finals for the second time in the season, scoring a 2–0 sweep in their best-of-three title series.

July 12

Swift Squeeze Juice Drinks 105, Sta. Lucia Realtors 88

Rizal Memorial Coliseum, Manila

July 13

Swift Squeeze Juice Drinks 97, Sta. Lucia Realtors 88
Swift wins series, 2-0

Rizal Memorial Coliseum, Manila

== Maharlika Cup ==
After the two-round eliminations among the seven regular members, Pop Cola (formerly Swift Squeeze), Magnolia, Crispa and Sta.Lucia advances in the semifinal round. El Rancho of Cebu and NBA Bacolod qualified in the Maharlika Cup semifinals as they top the San Miguel Beer Corporate Cup, a Division II tournament put up by the league that is playing simultaneously outside Metro Manila while the third conference was ongoing. Other provincial teams includes the Pampanga All-Stars, Pepsi-Mindanao, Shakey's-Baguio, Bicol-Kaypee and KABAKA-Manila. However, NBA Bacolod begged off to come to Manila because of the Political situation that happen in December.

Magnolia Ice Cream defeated Sta.Lucia, two games to one, in the finals as the Realtors finish bridesmaid in all three conferences of the season.

December 19

Magnolia Ice Cream 90, Sta. Lucia Realtors 91

Rizal Memorial Coliseum, Manila

December 21

Magnolia Ice Cream 106, Sta. Lucia Realtors 90

Rizal Memorial Coliseum, Manila

December 23

Magnolia Ice Cream 80, Sta. Lucia Realtors 78
Magnolia wins series, 2-1

Rizal Memorial Coliseum, Manila

== Records & Trivias ==
- On June 3, 1989, at the Ninoy Aquino Stadium, the Burger City-Agfa Color encounter had taken a record four overtimes and all of two hours and 45 minutes to complete, ushering the Freedom Cup. Stevenson Solomon tipped in a miss by teammate Arthur Ayson as time expired and lift Burger City past Agfa, 120–119.
- The whole season marks the first time in five years that regular guest ballclub, Cebu-based Mama's Love didn't participate in any of the three conferences. The seven regular ballclubs remain intact and no team disbanded or a new team that entered in the middle of the season.

== Notable events ==
- Sta. Lucia Realtors captures their first crown and it had to occur on foreign soil with reinforcements from other teams. They defeated the Korean Development Bank, 90–85 on July 30, to sweep the fourth Independence Cup basketball tournament in Jakarta. Eugene Quilban, on loan from Swift, was voted MVP.
- A PABL selection participated in the Qatar Friendship basketball tournament in Doha starting the second week of November. The PABL selection qualify into the semifinal round and finished third place.

== Occurrences ==
- Philips Sardines forfeited their last three semifinal games in the Invitational Cup, citing lousy officiating that led to their walkout and forfeiture of their remaining assignments.
- Schedules during the semifinals of the Maharlika Cup went disarray, first with the brownouts, then the Gintong Alay ordered the closure of the games at the Rizal Memorial Coliseum due to the PABL's failure to settle accounts. League officials, led by technical committee Lauro Mumar and PABL chairman Oscar Villadolid worked overtime to put back the scheduled games or look for an alternative venue.
