= Alvin Patrimonio =

Filipino basketball player

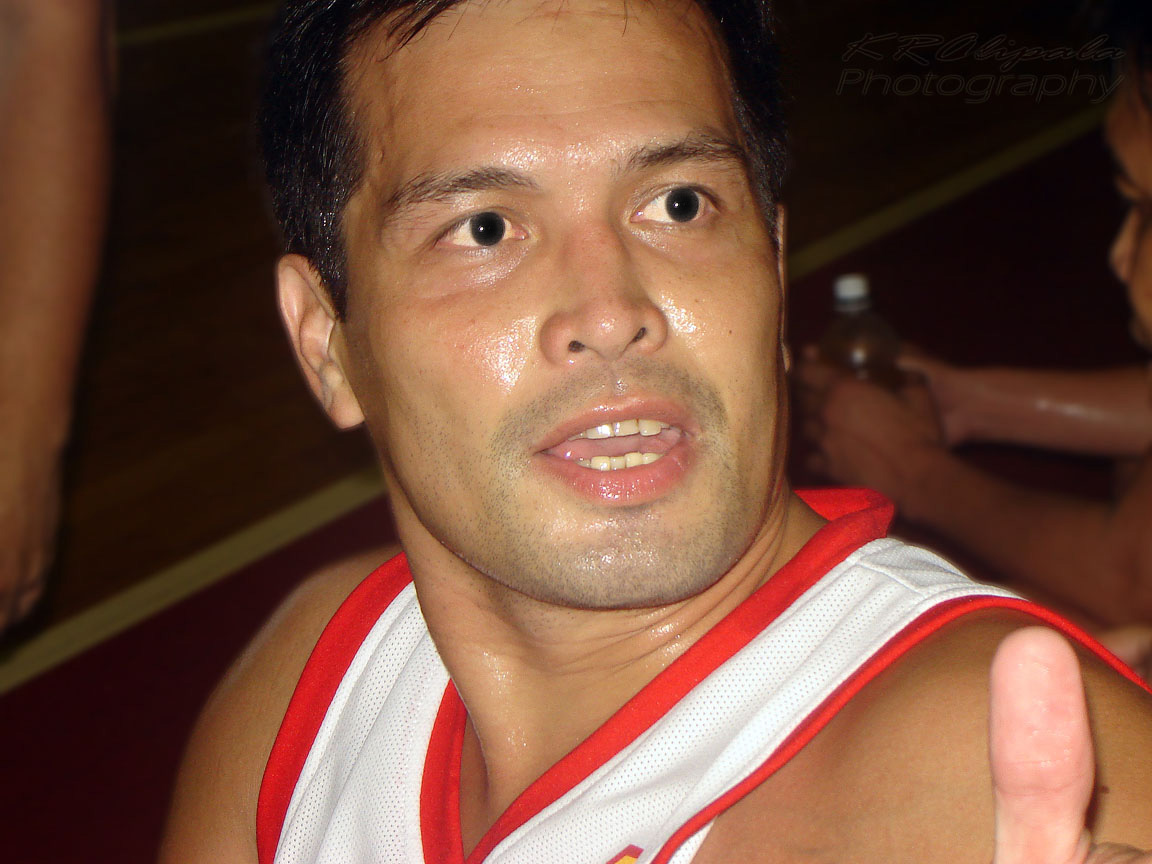
- Patrimonio in 2008

Personal details
- Born: November 17, 1966 (age 59) Quezon City, Philippines
- Party: Lakas–CMD
- Basketball career

Magnolia Chicken Timplados Hotshots
- Title: Team manager
- League: PBA

Personal information
- Listed height: 6 ft 3 in (1.91 m)
- Listed weight: 215 lb (98 kg)

Career information
- College: Mapúa
- PBA draft: 1988: direct hire
- Drafted by: Purefoods Hotdogs
- Playing career: 1988–2004
- Position: Power forward

Career history

Playing
- 1988–2004: Purefoods Hotdogs

Career highlights
- As player: 6x PBA champion (1990 Third, 1991 All-Filipino, 1993 All-Filipino, 1994 Commissioner's, 1997 All-Filipino, 2002 Governors'); 4x PBA Most Valuable Player (1991, 1993, 1994, 1997); 10x PBA Mythical First Team (1989–1994, 1996–1998, 2000); PBA Mythical Second Team (1995); 3x PBA Best Player of the Conference (1994 Commissioner's Cup, 1996 All-Filipino Cup, 1997 Governors' Cup); PBA Press Corps Newsmaker of the Year (1993); PBA All-Star Game Most Valuable Player (1991); 12× PBA All-Star (1989, 1990, 1991, 1992, 1993, 1995, 1996, 1997, 1998, 1999, 2000, 2001); 50 Greatest Players in PBA History (2000 selection); 3× PBA Scoring Champion (1992–1993, 1998); No. 16 retired by Magnolia Hotshots; 2x NCAA Philippines Most Valuable Player (1985, 1986); 3x PABL champion (1986 Filipino, 1987 Freedom, 1988 International Invitational); As executive: 8x PBA champion (2006 Philippine, 2009–10 Philippine, 2012 Commissioner's, 2013 Governors', 2013–14 Philippine, 2014 Commissioner's, 2014 Governors', 2018 Governors'); Grand Slam champion (2013–14)
Medals
Men's basketball
Representing Philippines
Asian Games
Bronze medal – third place	1986 Seoul	Team
Silver medal – second place	1990 Beijing	Team
Bronze medal – third place	1998 Bangkok	Team
SEA Games
Gold medal – first place	1987 Jakarta	Team
William Jones Cup
Gold medal – first place	1998 Taipei	Team

Alvin Dale Vergara Patrimonio (born November 17, 1966) is a Filipino retired professional basketball player from the Philippine Basketball Association and is the current team manager for the Magnolia Hotshots.

Patrimonio holds several PBA records including most consecutive games played (596); third most points scored in history (15,091); fourth most rebounds grabbed in history (more than 6,000) and second-most PBA Most Valuable Player awards (4, tied with Ramon Fernandez). He is also the second player after Bogs Adornado to win back-to-back MVP awards in 1993 and 1994, and also the second player to win three Best Player of the Conference award after Vergel Meneses. He also shares the distinction of having played the most Asian Games (4) with 1990 PBA MVP Allan Caidic.

He played his entire career with the Purefoods franchise and won six championships, mostly in the All-Filipino Conference championships with three.

He also was a part of the 1998 Philippine Centennial Team.

== Amateur career ==
Patrimonio, looking for an opportunity to play basketball, transferred to the Intramuros-based Mapúa Institute of Technology. There, he pursued a degree in Civil Engineering and saw action for the Mapúa Cardinals in the NCAA playing as the team's center from 1983 to 1986. He won the NCAA Most Valuable Player award back-to-back in 1985 and 1986 despite not leading the school to a championship.

Patrimonio first played for YCO Shine Masters in the Philippine Basketball League, now the PBA D-League). He moved to RFM-Swifts when the Elizalde ballclub disbanded after winning two championships in three conferences from 1986-87. Patrimonio had a two-conference stint with the Swift Hotdogs and won a title before joining the PBA in the middle of the 1988 season.

== National team career ==
Patrimonio has seen action for the Philippine national team many times in his playing career. Together with Allan Caidic, he shares the record of seeing action for the Asian Games four consecutive times in 1986, 1990, 1994 and 1998.

In the 1986 Asian Games, he was part of the all-amateur Philippine national team that was coached by Joe Lipa. The national team won the bronze medal after beating Jordan, 83-81. It finished third behind China and South Korea.

In the 1990 Asian Games, he was part of an all-PBA Philippine national team that was coached by Robert Jaworski. It was the first time that professional basketball players competed in the said event. It won the silver medal. It finished second after losing the Gold Medal Game to eventual champion China, 90-74.

In the 1994 Asian Games, he was part of the San Miguel Beer team that was sent to represent the Philippines compete in the Men's Basketball tournament. The team was coached by Norman Black. The national team lost the Bronze Medal Game to Japan, 79-76.

In the 1998 Asian Games, he was part of an all-PBA Philippine national team also known as the Philippine Centennial Team. The team was coached by Tim Cone. It won the bronze medal after beating Kazakhstan, 73-68. The same team also won the 1998 William Jones Cup after beating Chinese Taipei in the championship game, 82-72.

In 2000, he was part of the all-PBA All-Stars Select Team that represented the Philippines in the FIBA Asia All-Star Extravaganza. The said team was coached by Tim Cone.

== PBA career ==
Patrimonio entered the PBA in 1988 alongside the Rookie of the Year Jojo Lastimosa, many-time Mythical Team and Best Defensive Team member Jerry Codiñera and perennial Best Defensive Team member Glenn Capacio.

He was the subject of a controversy between Swift, his PABL team, and Purefoods, the team who drafted him. Both happen to be corporate rivals. There was a dispute between the two franchises which delayed his entry to the PBA. This ruined his chances of winning the Rookie of the Year award.

He stands at 6'3" and primarily played at the power forward position in the professional league. He also played the center position in his collegiate and amateur days. His style of play was said to be comparable to Karl Malone, characterized by rugged physical play punctuated by finesse maneuvers. His known trademark was the spin move to the low post which he utilized to great effect due to his exceptional pivoting skills.

In 1991, he signed a 5-year 25 million peso offer sheet from cellar-dwelling PBA ballclub Pepsi Hotshots which was matched by his mother ballclub Purefoods TJ Hotdogs. Patrimonio's new contract ushered the era of the multi-millionaire players. He justified this contract by winning the 1991, 1993 and 1994 Most Valuable Player awards of the PBA and leading the team to three conference championships. At the end of the contract, he managed to win his fourth Most Valuable Player award in the 1997 season, thus tying the all-time record.

Over time, his dominance in the post meant that he was accorded an automatic double or triple-team whenever he had possession in the low block. This led to the gradual adjustment of his game as he advanced in his career, showing superior playmaking abilities from passing out of multiple defenders at the post.

At the latter stage of his lengthy career, he also developed an accurate 3 point shot, and in 1998 he even led the league in 3 point FG percentage. With these added skills, he rounded out his playing days manning the small forward position.

In 2004, 16 years after playing in the pro league, he announced his retirement to concentrate more on his duties as the current team manager of the Purefoods franchise in the PBA. He ended his career as the league's third highest point scorer with 15,091, behind Ramon Fernandez and Abet Guidaben with 18,996 and 15,775 points respectively. He was also the fourth-ranked all-time rebounder in PBA history with more than 6,000 boards.

On November 26, 2005, he played in the Legends 3-Point Shootout during the PBA All-Star in Laoag, Ilocos Norte. The game saw Patrimonio sink the very last money ball to prop the Legends, also composed of Ronnie Magsanoc and Frankie Lim, to a 41-39 win over the young Turks of Jimmy Alapag, Ren-Ren Ritualo, and Dondon Hontiveros.

== Coaching career ==
In 2016, the NU Bulldogs men's basketball team tapped Patrimonio as part of the coaching staff.

== Hall of Fame ==
Patrimonio was inducted to the PBA Hall of Fame in 2011. Other honorees for the class of 2011 were Billy Ray Bates, Freddie Hubalde, Tommy Manotoc, Mariano Yenko, Tito Eduque and Bobong Velez. They were the fourth group of individuals that was honored by the league.

== PBA career statistics ==
Legend
GP	Games played	MPG	Minutes per game
FG%	Field-goal percentage	3P%	3-point field-goal percentage	FT%	Free-throw percentage
RPG	Rebounds per game	APG	Assists per game	SPG	Steals per game
BPG	Blocks per game	PPG	Points per game	**Bold**	Career high

Year	Team	GP	MPG	FG%	3P%	FT%	RPG	APG	SPG	BPG	PPG
1988	Purefoods	33	33.1	.592	.000	.860	8.8	1.6	.2	1.0	17.2
1989	Purefoods	65	34.9	.593	.000	.855	**10.7**	2.3	.3	1.2	19.9
1990	Purefoods	54	34.1	**.622**	.273	.849	7.6	2.2	.2	.9	19.4
1991	Purefoods	56	38.9	.609	**.667**	.833	9.0	2.8	.3	**1.3**	21.8
1992	Purefoods	56	**42.0**	.589	.250	.871	10.0	**3.3**	.2	1.1	**25.2**
1993	Coney Island / Purefoods	**67**	38.0	.566	.390	.833	8.9	2.9	.4	.7	21.6
1994	Coney Island / Purefoods	63	38.4	.522	.317	.867	8.3	2.5	.4	1.1	19.8
1995	Purefoods	61	39.0	.556	.370	.871	7.9	2.3	.3	.7	20.9
1996	Purefoods	60	37.1	.490	.289	.860	7.3	2.7	.5	.5	17.6
1997	Purefoods	63	40.2	.513	.513	.837	7.5	2.7	.4	.5	20.3
1998	Purefoods	34	40.1	.451	.333	.878	6.2	2.7	**.6**	.7	19.1
1999	Purefoods	41	40.1	.446	.381	.867	6.0	3.0	**.6**	.3	16.7
2000	Purefoods	55	36.8	.439	.323	.857	5.3	2.1	.5	.3	12.8
2001	Purefoods	45	38.3	.443	.376	.908	4.4	2.0	.3	.1	12.9
2002	Purefoods	43	21.9	.446	.412	.868	2.6	1.2	.1	.1	8.0
2003	Purefoods	36	18.2	.373	.328	.909	2.3	1.0	.1	.1	4.9
2004–05	Purefoods	25	12.4	.452	.553	**1.000**	1.8	.6	.1	.1	4.2
Career		857	35.6	.531	.375	.858	7.2	2.4	.3	.7	17.6

== Accomplishments and records ==
=== Career PBA highlights ===
- Most Valuable Player in 1991, 1993, 1994, and 1997
- Mythical First Team Selection in 1989, 1990, 1991, 1992, 1993, 1994, 1996, 1997, 1998, and 2000
- Mythical Second Team Selection in 1995
- Best Player of the Conference in 1994 Commissioner's Cup, 1996 All-Filipino Cup, and 1997 Governor's Cup
- PBA Press Corps Newsmaker of the Year in 1993
- 12-time PBA All-Star
- Most Valuable Player of the 1991 PBA All-Star Game
- 25 PBA Greatest Players Member
- PBA 5,000 Points Club Member
- PBA 10,000 Points Club Member
- PBA 15,000 Points Club Member
- PBA Third Conference champions (1990)
- PBA All-Filipino Cup champions (1991, 1993, 1997)
- PBA Commissioner's Cup champions (1994)
- PBA Governor's Cup champions (2002)

=== International career highlights ===
- 1986 Asian Games bronze medalist
- 1990 Asian Games silver medalist
- 1994 Asian Games, fourth place
- 1998 William Jones Cup (champions)
- 1998 Asian Games bronze medalist
- 2000 PBA All-Stars versus the Asia Basketball Select Team

=== PBA records ===
- Second-most MVP awards (4, tied with Ramon Fernandez)
- Most consecutive games played (596)
- One of eight players to play at least 800 games

== Off the court ==
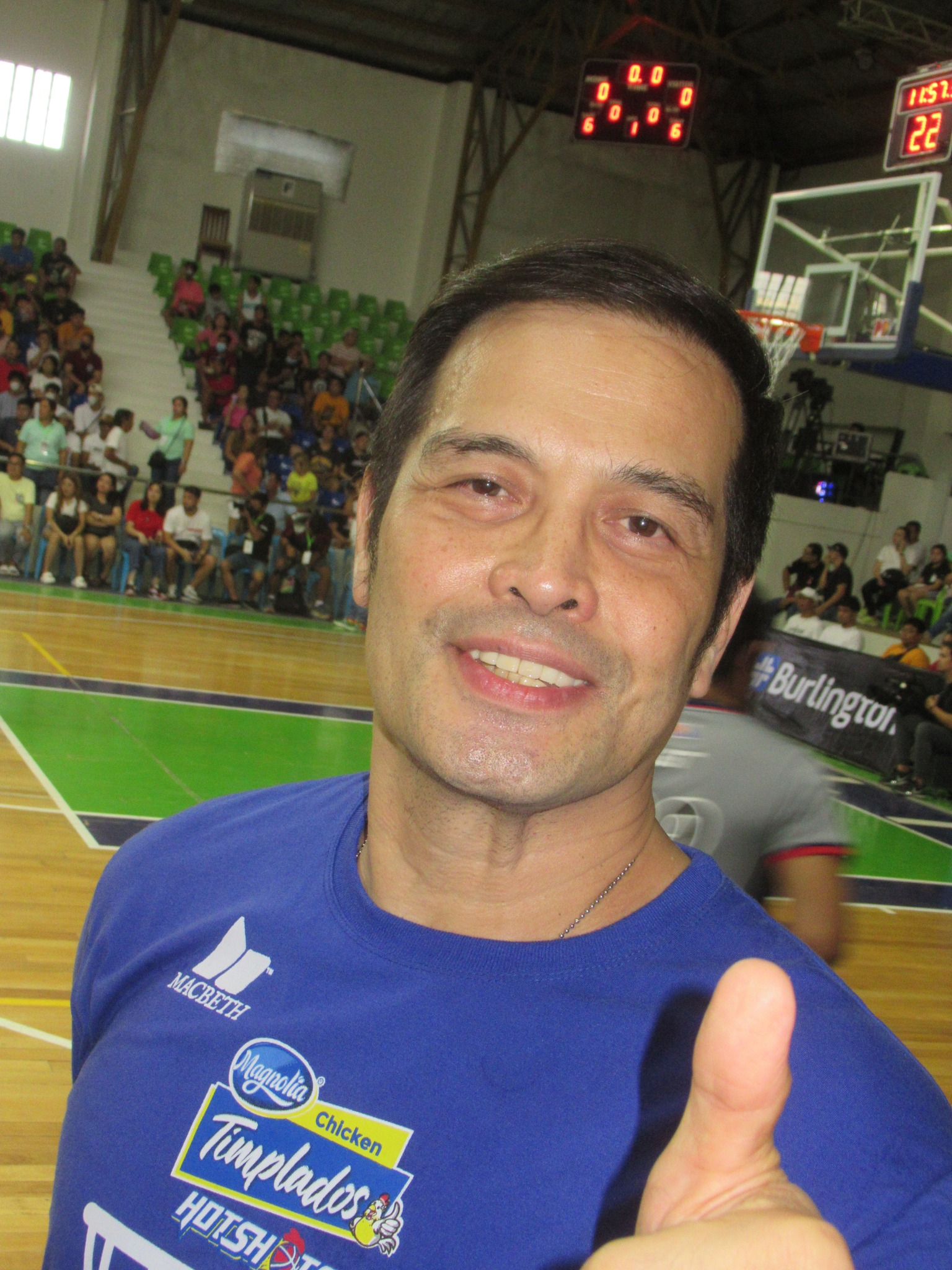
Patrimonio in 2023

=== Personal life ===
Patrimonio currently lives in Cainta, Rizal, together with his wife, makeup artist Cindy Conwi, and their four children Angelo, Christine, Clarice and Asher. Angelo embarked on a career in local showbiz, but put it on hold to be able to finish his culinary arts degree at the College of Saint Benilde in Manila.

Alvin Patrimonio married his wife in 1989.

Christine, who both played with Clarice, for the NU Bulldogs Tennis Team in the UAAP is making her name in the local women's tennis circuit and is also looking into having a showbiz career. She was one of the former housemates of Pinoy Big Brother: Unlimited. She is a commercial model and her Creamsilk TVC was shown in April 2011.

Clarice on the other hand has 2 international championships in tennis. She is currently ranked 130th in the world of Juniors Tennis and turned professional in 2012. She won the women's division title in the recently concluded 34th PCA Open Tennis Championship last September 2015, also she took part in the National Team for Tennis in the 2015 SEA Games for Women's Singles category but did not advance through the semifinals.

Patrimonio has one grandson from Clarice, with her partner Ateneo de Manila University Blue Eagle center Jobe Nkemakolam.

=== Acting career ===
During his playing years in the PBA, Patrimonio found time to do movies. He first appeared as guest in the Mars Ravelo classic Bondying which starred retired PBA player Jimmy Santos. Then he was launched together with Jerry Codiñera and Paul Alvarez in the film Last Two Minutes in 1990. The movie was a top-grosser at the box-office and spawned a sitcom of the same title aired over PTV. He was also paired with Maricel Soriano in the remake of the Robert Jaworski / Nora Aunor film Dobol Dribol in 1992 and did Tasya Fantasya opposite Kris Aquino in 1994. In 2009, Alvin once more tried the showbiz waters when he guest starred in the indie film Dalaw with actress Katrina Halili.

=== Political career ===
Patrimonio is running for mayor of Cainta in 2022, under Lakas–CMD.

== Endorsements ==
He is also an endorser of many products such as Purefoods, Swatch, Lipovitan, Kaypee Shoes (during his first few years as a pro player), Nike, etc. He appeared in a political ad campaign for Senator Manny Villar. Alvin and his daughters are also endorsers for New San Jose Builders Inc.
