= Glenn Capacio =

Filipino basketball player and coach

NU Bulldogs
- Title: Assistant coach
- League: UAAP

Personal information
- Born: May 15, 1964 (age 62) Palo, Leyte
- Listed height: 6 ft 1 in (1.85 m)
- Listed weight: 185 lb (84 kg)

Career information
- High school: Leyte Institute of Technology (Tacloban)
- College: FEU
- PBA draft: 1988: Direct hire
- Drafted by: Purefoods Hotdogs
- Playing career: 1988–2001
- Position: Shooting guard / small forward
- Coaching career: 2005–present

Career history

Playing
- 1988–1996: Purefoods Hotdogs
- 1997–2000: Mobiline Phone Pals
- 2001: Batang Red Bull Energizers

Coaching
- 2005–2006: FEU (assistant)
- 2007–2010: FEU
- 2009–2012: AirAsia Philippine Patriots
- 2012–2013: GlobalPort Batang Pier
- 2013–2014: GlobalPort Batang Pier (assistant)
- 2014–2015: Kia Sorento (assistant)
- 2014: Lyceum (assistant)
- 2015, 2018: Letran (assistant)
- 2016–2018: De La Salle (assistant)
- 2019–2024: JRU (assistant)
- 2020–present: NU (assistant)
- 2025–present: Ilagan Isabela Cowboys (assistant)
- 2026: Converge FiberXers (assistant)

Career highlights
- As player: 5× PBA champion (1990 Third, 1991 All-Filipino, 1993 All-Filipino, 1994 Commissioner's, 2001 Commissioner's); PBA Comeback Player of the Year (1998); 8x PBA All-Defensive Team (1989-1995, 1998); PBA All-Star (1995); UAAP champion (1983); UAAP MVP (1983); As head coach: ABL champion (2010); As assistant coach: AsiaBasket champion (2024 International); 2× UAAP champion (2005, 2016); NCAA Philippines champion (2015)
Medals
Men's basketball
Representing Philippines
Asian Games
Bronze medal – third place	1986 Seoul	Team
SEA Games
Gold medal – first place	1987 Jakarta	Team

Glenn Capacio (born May 15, 1964, in Palo, Leyte) is a Filipino retired professional basketball player in the Philippine Basketball Association (PBA) and the former head coach of PBA team GlobalPort Batang Pier and was also the former head coach of the FEU Tamaraws from 2007 to 2010.

== College and amateur career ==
Capacio was the FEU Tamaraws' skipper during the 1983 UAAP season and the most dependable performer for rookie coach Bong Chua. He started his basketball career at Far Eastern University under coach Arturo Valenzona for two years and a year under coach Chee Poblete. He studied at Leyte Institute of Technology during high school and later moved to Manila and joined the Trinity College team for a year until graduation before moving on to FEU. Glenn's commercial basketball club experience includes playing for YCO Shine Masters and RFM-Swift Hotdogs in the PABL.

Capacio also saw action for the national team under coach Joe Lipa in the 1986 Asian Games and the 1987 Jones Cup, ABC championships and SEA Games.

== PBA career ==
Beginning the 1997 season, Capacio was traded by Purefoods to Mobiline for Cadel Mosqueda, reportedly to free up room in the team's salary cap. He played a key role in Mobiline's drive to two finals appearance in the following year during the Centennial Cup and Governors Cup. Capacio regained a spot in the All-defensive team and bagged the Comeback Player of the Year award from the PBA Press Corps by the end of the 1998 PBA season.

He was an eight-time member of the All-Defensive Team and a member of the 5,000 point club, its 43rd, when he achieved the milestone on November 27, 1998. Capacio was signed by new team Batang Red Bull in 2000 to play quality minutes off the bench but an injury-plagued season with the Thunder lead him to retirement, playing just five games in his final year in 2001.

== Coaching career ==
Capacio first started his coaching career after being hired by his college alma mater, the FEU Tamaraws, to coach its basketball team in 2007. He led the team to the Final Four in three of his four years with the team losing the semifinals in his next two years(2008 & 2009) and losing to the Ateneo Blue Eagles in the 2010 finals.

Capacio left FEU to coach the AirAsia Philippine Patriots of the fledgling ASEAN Basketball League (ABL) and leading the team to the title in the league's first season.

In 2012, the Patriots franchise folded after team owner Mikee Romero had his franchise application to the PBA accepted. Capacio took over as the interim head coach for the team. In January 2013, the team announced that it hired Junel Baculi as their permanent head coach. Capacio was relegated to being the first assistant coach of the team.

After the 2013–14 season, Capacio signed with expansion team Kia Sorento as one of their assistant coaches expected to fill the void whenever head coach Manny Pacquiao is unable to attend to the team. After players Alex Nuyles and Mike Burtscher voiced out to social media their frustration to the team, Capacio decided to follow suit. Capacio said that he was unduly terminated by the team because of his failure to attend team meetings. He also said that he was fired as early as January 2015, and with 18 months still left in his contract, the team offered to buy out only three months of his contract, to which he refused. He has since filed a case against the team.

After an uneventful stint with Kia, Capacio decided to go back to the college ranks, where he served as an assistant coach under Aldin Ayo for the Letran Knights of the NCAA Philippines that won the basketball title in 2015.

After Ayo was tapped to be the head coach of the De La Salle Green Archers of the UAAP, he, along with other members of the coaching staff, followed. He won another title there, his first in the UAAP as a coach.

== Coaching record ==
=== Collegiate record ===
Season	Team	GP	W	L	PCT	Finish	PG	PW	PL	PPCT	Results
2007	FEU	14	8	6	.571	5th	1	0	1	.000	4th-seed playoff
2008	FEU	14	10	4	.714	3rd	2	0	2	.000	Semifinals
2009	FEU	14	11	3	.786	2nd	2	0	2	.000	Semifinals
2010	FEU	14	12	2	.857	1st	3	1	2	.333	Finals
Totals		56	41	15	.732		8	1	7	.125	0 championships

=== Professional record ===
Season	Conference	Team	Elimination round					Playoffs				
Season	Conference	Team	GP	W	L	PCT	Finish	PG	W	L	PCT	Results
2012–13	Philippine Cup	GlobalPort	14	1	13	.071	10th	—	—	—	—	Eliminated
Career Total			14	1	13	.071	Playoff Total	0	0	0	.000	0 championships

== Personal ==
He has three brothers who play basketball with the eldest, Ely Capacio, being a national team player and played for Tanduay in the PBA.

His son, Gwynne Matthew, played college basketball for the Ateneo Blue Eagles.
