= Harvey Carey =

Filipino-American basketball player

Personal information
- Born: March 18, 1979 (age 47) San Francisco, California, U.S.
- Listed height: 6 ft 3 in (1.91 m)
- Listed weight: 210 lb (95 kg)

Career information
- High school: Burton Academic High School (San Francisco)
- College: Skyline Junior College (1997–1999); Sonoma State (1999–2002)
- PBA draft: 2003: 1st round, 4th overall pick
- Drafted by: Talk 'N Text Phone Pals
- Playing career: 2003–2020
- Position: Power forward / small forward
- Number: 4

Career history
- 2003–2020: Talk 'N Text Phone Pals / Talk 'N Text Tropang Texters / TNT Tropang Texters / Tropang TNT / TNT KaTropa / TNT Tropang Giga

Career highlights
- 7× PBA champion (2003 All-Filipino, 2009 Philippine, 2011 Philippine, 2011 Commissioner's, 2012 Philippine, 2013 Philippine, 2015 Commissioner's); PBA All-Star (2011); PBA Mythical Second Team (2003); PBA All-Defensive Team (2007); No. 4 retired by the TNT Tropang Giga

Harvey Nicklos Miguel Carey (born March 18, 1979) is a Filipino-American former professional basketball player. He spent his entire career with the TNT Tropang Giga in the Philippine Basketball Association (PBA).

== High school career ==
Carey didn't play basketball until he was in high school, as his first sport was baseball. In his senior year, he led Burton Academic High School to a Division II Academic Athletic Association City Championship. To this day, it is the only championship in their program's history. He also averaged 18 points per game, won San Francisco's public school player of the year honors, and was a first-team all-state selection.

== College career ==
Carey first played at Skyline Junior College, where he won the team awards of Most Improved Player and Best Defense in his time there. He then played at Division II Sonoma State University.

== Professional career ==
=== TNT Franchise (2003–2020) ===
==== 2003: Rookie season ====
Carey was drafted fourth overall by the Talk 'N Text Phone Pals in the 2003 PBA Draft. Several picks later, Talk 'N Text selected Jimmy Alapag at 10th. In his first conference, the All-Filipino Cup, he led all rookies in rebounding while averaging nine points a game. Talk 'N Text made it to their first All-Filipino Cup Finals that season, and were able to win it all. For the Reinforced Conference, they finished in third place. Aside from winning a championship in his rookie season, he was also on the Mythical Second Team, averaging 10.7 points and 8.5 rebounds while Alapag was named Rookie of the Year and Mythical First Team, and teammate Asi Taulava was named MVP.

==== 2005–08 season: All-Defensive team ====
In a win over the Air21 Express during the 2006 Philippine Cup, Carey scored a career-high 30 points while also grabbing 19 rebounds. The following season, he was on the All-Defensive Team, averaging 7.6 rebounds.

During the 2007–08 season, Carey and Macmac Cardona committed a flagrant foul on Jojo Tangkay in their match against the Welcoat Dragons. The two were thrown out of the game. Carey was then given a two-game suspension while Cardona was suspended for one game as both had to pay a P20,000 fine.

==== 2008–10 seasons: Start of Philippine Cup dominance ====
In Game 6 of their 2008–09 Philippine Cup semifinals, Carey pulled down a personal-best 22 rebounds as they advanced to the Finals. There they won over the Alaska Aces in seven games, overcoming a 3–2 series deficit to do so. He also helped them prevent a 3–0 series lead earlier in the series with 11 points and a game-high 14 rebounds in their Game 3 win.

Against the Rain or Shine Elasto Painters during the 2009–10 Philippine Cup, Carey scored 14 points all in the fourth quarter, but they still lost despite also holding a lead as high as 20 points. That conference, they were not able to defend their title as they were eliminated by Barangay Ginebra in the first round of the playoffs. In the 2010 Fiesta Conference, Talk 'N Text finished in third place, as they defeated the Derby Ace Llamados in the third-place playoff with Carey's 24 points and 13 rebounds.

==== 2010–11: Near Grand Slam and All-Star season ====
To begin the 2010–11 season, Carey led with 17 points and 17 rebounds in a win over the B-Meg Llamados. He then followed it up with 20 points, 14 rebounds, and three assists in a win over the Beermen to claim the first Player of the Week award of the season. He then contributed 13 points off the bench to give Talk 'N Text the win over the Air21 Express and claim the first seed. Talk 'N Text went on to win the Philippine Cup championship that year, with Alapag and Jayson Castro as co-MVPs. He became an All-Star reserve that season, scoring eight points.

==== 2011–13 seasons: Three straight Philippine Cup titles ====
With Alapag, Kelly Williams, and Ranidel de Ocampo still resting from national team duties at the start of the season, Carey stepped up with 28 points and 14 rebounds in a win over Rain or Shine. For his performance, he was awarded Player of the Week. He then led Talk 'N Text with 25 points and 15 rebounds, but they still lost to B-Meg. Against the Petron Blaze Boosters, with Talk 'N Text down 78–76, he had the opportunity to make two free throws. He made the first and missed the second, but it was rebounded by teammate Japeth Aguilar, who made a three-point play off the miss to get Talk 'N Text the 80–78 win and more importantly a twice-to-beat advantage for the playoffs. They returned to the Philippine Cup Finals, where they beat the Powerade Tigers in five games. He and five other players were out to start the Governors' Cup. However, he was still injured by the time Talk 'N Text made the semifinals.

During the 2012–13 Philippine Cup, Carey became the 38th player in the league to make the elite 2,000 defensive rebounds club. Once again, Talk 'N Text reached the Finals against Rain or Shine with the opportunity to win their third straight Philippine Cup title. This time they swept Rain or Shine in four games, giving Carey and Alapag their fifth All-Filipino title as a duo.

==== 2013–14 season ====
In a 2013–14 Philippine Cup win over Alaska, Carey scored 10 of his 15 points in the fourth quarter. He then had a double-double of 10 points and 14 rebounds in a win over the GlobalPort Batang Pier. In a win over Rain or Shine, he led the team in rebounding as he grabbed 15 of the franchise's season-high 64 rebounds. In the Commissioner's Cup, they started 5–0 with a win over the Meralco Bolts in which he had 11 points and six rebounds.

==== 2014–15 season: Final conference alongside Alapag and last championship ====
In a win over Meralco, he grabbed seven points, 14 rebounds and had two crucial blocks, giving them their third straight win of the 2014–15 Philippine Cup conference. He was more aggressive in scoring during that conference, with as Kelly Williams was injured. This culminated in a season-high 24 points with 10 rebounds in their loss to GlobalPort. Against Purefoods Star Hotshots, he scored four straight points in the clutch to help Talk 'N Text take the win. In the playoffs, they were eliminated by the Beermen. That would be the last conference Carey played alongside Alapag, as he would retire a few months later. In the Commissioner's Cup Finals, they were able to win in double overtime of Game 7 to claim their seventh championship.

==== 2015–2020 seasons ====
In the offseason, Carey re-signed with Talk 'N Text for two more years. He scored 11 points in a win over the NLEX Road Warriors during the 2016 Commissioner's Cup. In a Game 3 semifinals loss to Ginebra during the 2017 Commissioner's Cup, he scored 11 points.

During the 2019 season, Carey became the third player to play more than 700 games with only one ballclub, a mark only Alvin Patrimonio and Mark Caguioa have reached. They made the Commissioner's Cup Finals that season, in which he, Castro, and Williams faced Alapag once again, who was an assistant coach for the Beermen at the time. Alapag's side won the championship over them in six games.

In 2020, Carey announced that his 17th season in the league would be his final season. In his final season in the league, he averaged less than a point and 1.8 rebounds per game, playing spot minutes as TNT reached the 2020 Philippine Cup Finals. On February 1, 2021, he announced his retirement from professional basketball. On June 28, 2023, the TNT Tropang Giga retired his jersey number 4, the second TNT player to be given that honor after Alapag. His jersey was retired after import Matt Mobley wore it in 2022 and Alapag commented on social media that Carey's number should have been retired.

== Player profile ==
Carey is known as a role player, bringing energy and making hustle plays when on the court. Although he is undersized for the power forward position at 6'3", he is known as a capable rebounder. He once led the league in rebounding, and is a member of the PBA's 2,000 defensive rebounds and 1,000 offensive rebounds clubs.

Although not known for his scoring, Carey can fill that role when needed, especially when teammates are unavailable or injured. He can score without plays being designed for him. In his last two years in the league, he developed his mid-range jumper, becoming a capable shooter from midrange.

== PBA career statistics ==
Legend
GP	Games played	MPG	Minutes per game
FG%	Field-goal percentage	3P%	3-point field-goal percentage	FT%	Free-throw percentage
RPG	Rebounds per game	APG	Assists per game	SPG	Steals per game
BPG	Blocks per game	PPG	Points per game	**Bold**	Career high

=== Season-by-season averages ===
Year	Team	GP	MPG	FG%	3P%	FT%	RPG	APG	SPG	BPG	PPG
2003	Talk 'N Text	56	29.6	.487	.083	.507	8.5	1.3	**.7**	.3	10.7
2004–05	Talk 'N Text	27	19.4	.513	.000	.500	4.7	1.0	.3	.0	6.7
2005–06	Talk 'N Text	41	23.6	.514	.000	.505	7.2	.7	.5	.6	7.7
2006–07	Talk 'N Text	62	**30.8**	**.580**	.000	.523	7.6	1.5	.4	.2	**11.4**
2007–08	Talk 'N Text	34	24.1	.401	.000	.587	4.7	**1.7**	.5	.4	5.6
2008–09	Talk 'N Text	46	30.2	.545	.000	.604	**9.7**	**1.7**	.3	**.8**	8.6
2009–10	Talk 'N Text	46	26.9	.562	.000	.579	8.2	1.6	.5	.4	10.8
2010–11	Talk 'N Text	**65**	21.8	.476	.000	.639	8.0	1.4	.3	.3	8.5
2011–12	Talk 'N Text	45	18.3	.445	.200	.648	6.3	1.0	.2	.2	6.4
2012–13	Talk 'N Text	55	13.8	.419	.000	.804	4.6	.6	.3	.1	3.8
2013–14	Talk 'N Text	47	15.7	.406	—	.542	4.8	.5	.2	.3	3.7
2014–15	Talk 'N Text	46	16.0	.446	.000	.608	5.4	.5	.3	.4	4.2
2015–16	TNT	39	13.7	.450	—	.569	5.3	.7	.2	.4	3.9
2016–17	TNT	47	9.7	.478	—	.674	3.3	.5	.2	.2	2.5
2017–18	TNT	36	8.9	.347	**.333**	.618	2.6	.4	.2	.3	2.1
2019	TNT	25	6.2	.345	.000	**1.000**	1.9	.3	.1	.2	.9
2020	TNT	11	6.9	.400	.000	.500	1.8	.8	.0	.0	.8
Career		728	19.9	.492	.074	.579	6.1	1.0	.3	.3	6.4

== Post-retirement ==
After retiring, Carey became a PE teacher and assistant coach for the varsity basketball team of Sacred Heart Cathedral Preparatory. He also helps in recruiting Filipino-American players to play for the Philippines men's national basketball team.

== Personal life ==
Carey is married to a Pampanga native with two sons, Trey and Harlem. His mother is a Filipina who worked at a post office for 20 years while his father was a bus driver for 30 years. He has a sister, Danielle.
