= List of Barako Bull Energy Boosters seasons =

Legend
Champion

Runner-up

Semifinalist

This is a list of seasons by the Barako Bull Energy Boosters of the Philippine Basketball Association.

== Three-conference era ==
Season	Conference	Team name	Overall record			Finals
Season	Conference	Team name	W	L	%	Finals
2000	All-Filipino Cup	Batang Red Bull Energizers	3	11	.214	
2000	Commissioner's Cup	Batang Red Bull Energizers	3	6	.333	
2000	Governors Cup	Batang Red Bull Energizers	10	5	.667	
2001	All-Filipino Cup	Red Bull Thunder	8	8	.500	
2001	Commissioner's Cup	Red Bull Thunder	14	7	.667	Red Bull 4, San Miguel 2
2001	Governors Cup	Red Bull Thunder	6	8	.429	
2002	Governors Cup	Red Bull Thunder	8	8	.500	
2002	Commissioner's Cup	Red Bull Thunder	15	7	.582	Red Bull 4, Talk 'N Text 3
2002	All-Filipino Cup	Red Bull Thunder	10	4	.592	
2003	All-Filipino Cup	Red Bull Thunder	15	6	.714	
2003	Invitational Conference	Red Bull Barako	3	3	.500	
2003	Reinforced Conference	Red Bull Barako	12	4	.750	
Overall record			107	77	.583	2 championships

== Two-conference era ==
Season	Conference	Team name	Elimination/classification round						Playoffs	
Season	Conference	Team name	Finish	GP	W	L	PCT	GB	Stage	Results
(2004)	Fiesta Conference	Red Bull Barako	5th/10	18	10	8	.556	5	Wildcard phase Quarterfinals; Semifinals; Finals	Red Bull 83, Shell 82*; 2nd in Group A (2–1); Red Bull 2, Coca-Cola 1 Barangay Ginebra 3, Red Bull 1
2004-05	Philippine Cup	Red Bull Barako	10th/10	18	6	12	.333	6	Did not qualify	
2004-05	Fiesta Conference	Red Bull Barako	6th/10	18	9	9	.500	3	Wildcard phase Quarterfinals; Semifinals; 3rd-place playoff	Red Bull 2, Barangay Ginebra 0 Red Bull 2, Alaska 1 San Miguel 3, Red Bull 2 Shell 102, Red Bull 86*
2005-06	Fiesta Conference	Red Bull Barako	3rd/9	16	9	7	.563	1	2nd-seed playoff Quarterfinals; Semifinals; Finals	Barangay Ginebra 109, Red Bull 102*; Red Bull 3, Alaska 0 Red Bull 4, Barangay Ginebra 3 Red Bull 4, Purefoods 2
2005-06	Philippine Cup	Red Bull Barako	3rd/9	16	9	7	.563	3	Quarterfinals; Semifinals; Finals	Red Bull 3, Barangay Ginebra 2 Red Bull 4, San Miguel 3 Purefoods 4, Red Bull 2
2006-07	Philippine Cup	Red Bull Barako	3rd/10	18	11	7	.611	2	Quarterfinals; Semifinals; 3rd-place playoff	Red Bull 3, Sta. Lucia 1 San Miguel 4, Red Bull 3 Talk 'N Text 124, Red Bull 111*
2006-07	Fiesta Conference	Red Bull Barako	1st/10	18	13	5	.722	--	Semifinals; 3rd-place playoff	Talk 'N Text 4, Red Bull 2 Red Bull 103, San Miguel 96*
2007-08	Philippine Cup	Red Bull Barako	4th/10	18	11	7	.611	1	Quarterfinals; Semifinals; 3rd-place playoff	Red Bull 2, Magnolia 0 Purefoods 4, Red Bull 3 Red Bull 125, Alaska 104*
2007-08	Fiesta Conference	Red Bull Barako	2nd/10	18	11	7	.611	1	Semifinals; 3rd-place playoff	Barangay Ginebra 4, Red Bull 0 Red Bull 102, Magnolia 90*
2008-09	Philippine Cup	Red Bull Barako	10th/10	18	5	13	.278	7	Did not qualify	
2008-09	Fiesta Conference	Barako Bull Energy Boosters	10th/10	14	2	12	.143	9	Wildcard phase	Rain or Shine** 96, Barako Bull 88
2009-10	Philippine Cup	Barako Bull Energy Boosters	10th/10	18	3	15	.167	10	Did not qualify	
2009-10	Fiesta Conference	Barako Energy Coffee Masters	10th/10	18	3	15	.167	12	Did not qualify	
Elimination/classification round				226	102	124	.451	—	8 post-wildcard appearances	
Playoffs				93	48	45	.516	—	3 Finals appearances	
Cumulative totals				319	150	169	.470	—	1 championship	

*one-game playoffs
**team had twice-to-beat advantage

== Three-conference era ==
Season	Conference	Team name	Elimination round						Playoffs	
Season	Conference	Team name	Finish	GP	W	L	PCT	GB	Stage	Results
2010-11	Philippine Cup	Barako Bull Energy Boosters	10th/10	14	3	11	.214	8	Did not qualify	
Elimination round				14	3	11	.214	—	0 semifinal appearances	
Playoffs				0	0	0	--	—	0 Finals appearances	
Cumulative records				14	3	11	.214	—	0 championships	

*one-game playoffs
**team had the twice-to-beat advantage

== Cumulative records ==
Era	GP	W	L	PCT
Three-conference era (1975-2003)	179	104	75	.581
Two-conference era (2004-2010)	319	150	169	.470
Three-conference era (2010)	14	3	11	.214
Total	515	258	257	.501
