= 2003 Talk 'N Text Phone Pals season =

- Head coach: Paul Woolpert; Joel Banal; Ariel Vanguardia (interim basis in last 2 conferences)
- General manager: Frankie Lim
- Owners: Smart Communications (an MVP Group subsidiary)

All-Filipino Cup results
- Record: 19–13 (59.4%)
- Place: 1st
- Playoff finish: Champions

Invitational Cup results
- Record: 3–1 (75%)
- Place: N/A
- Playoff finish: N/A

Reinforced Conference results
- Record: 9–10 (47.4%)
- Place: 3rd
- Playoff finish: Semis (lost to Coca Cola)

Talk 'N Text Phone Pals seasons

The 2003 Talk 'N Text Phone Pals season was the 14th season of the franchise in the Philippine Basketball Association (PBA) and third season under the management of Smart Communications.

== Transactions ==
Players Added

Via Draft

- Jimmy Alapag
- Harvey Carey
- William Villa

Via Free Agency

- Angelo David (From Sta. Lucia Realtors; Both teams agreed to share obligations on contract of the player)
- Jonathan De Guzman (Drafted by Purefoods in 2001)
- Expedito Falcasantos (From Sta. Lucia Realtors)
- Jojo Manalo (From Coca Cola Tigers)
Players Lost

Via Free Agency

- Don Camaso (To Alaska)
- Alex Crisano (To Barangay Ginebra Kings)

Via Trade

- Gilbert Demape (To Purefoods and their 6th pick; acquired the Hotdogs' number 4 pick)

== Occurrences ==
February 27: PBA Suspends Asi Taulava for two games after he was found to have traces of Marijuana during a mandated test conducted by league physician Ben Salud.

April 12: Phone Pals coach Paul Woolpert was fired by the management and named assistant coach Joel Banal as his interim replacement.

May 6: Forward Norman Gonzales was also tested positive of banned substance, he was the fifth player to be suspended indefinitely by the PBA and was ordered to undergo a six-month rehabilitation.

August 15: Talk 'N Text acting head coach Ariel Vanguardia, who took over from Joel Banal, when the latter decided to honor his commitment with the Ateneo Blue Eagles in the UAAP, was slapped with a five-game suspension and a P50,000 fine while the team P250,000 in a game-sham that took place on August 13 when the Phone Pals tried to extend a winning ballgame against Red Bull in overtime by deliberately shooting on the Barako's goal, Talk 'N Text representative to the PBA board Ricky Vargas said the team will appeal the five-game suspension to Commissioner Noli Eala since the Phone Pals cannot hire an interim coach for five games starting the Third Conference.

== Championship ==
The Talk 'N Text Phone Pals won their first championship in the All-Filipino Cup by defeating the defending champions Coca Cola Tigers. The Phone Pals lost the first two games of the series but won the next four to clinch their first title in 13 years, not counting the 1998 Centennial Cup triumph. Asi Taulava was voted finals MVP of the series.

== Awards ==
- Asi Taulava won the coveted Most Valuable Player (MVP) Award, aside from winning the Best Player of the Conference in the All-Filipino Cup.
- Jimmy Alapag won the Rookie of the Year honors.

== Roster ==
2003 Talk 'N Text Phone Pals roster
Players

Pos.	#	POB	Name	Height	Weight	DOB (YYYY–MM–DD)	From
F	00	(United States)	William Villa	6 ft 2 in (1.88 m)			BYU–Hawaii
G	1	(Philippines)	Bong Ravena	6 ft 1 in (1.85 m)			UE
G	3	(United States)	Jimmy Alapag	5 ft 9 in (1.75 m)			Cal State San Bernardino
F	4	(United States)	Harvey Carey	6 ft 3 in (1.91 m)			Sonoma State
F	6	(Philippines)	Noli Locsin	6 ft 3 in (1.91 m)			De La Salle
G	8	(Philippines)	Patrick Fran	6 ft 0 in (1.83 m)			UST
F	13	(Philippines)	Mark Telan	6 ft 6 in (1.98 m)			De La Salle
F	15	(Philippines)	Expedito Falcasantos	6 ft 4 in (1.93 m)			Cebu
F	19	(Philippines)	Norman Gonzales	6 ft 4 in (1.93 m)			San Beda
F	21	(United States)	Damian Cantrell (I)	6 ft 4 in (1.93 m)			San Francisco
G/F	28	(Philippines)	Jojo Manalo	6 ft 2 in (1.88 m)			UPHSD
F	33	(Philippines)	Victor Pablo	6 ft 4 in (1.93 m)			Far Eastern
C	38	(Philippines)	Angelo David	6 ft 6 in (1.98 m)			Far Eastern
G	42	(Philippines)	Donbel Belano	5 ft 8 in (1.73 m)			Visayas
C	88	(Tonga)	Asi Taulava	6 ft 9 in (2.06 m)			BYU–Hawaii
G	99	(Philippines)	Jonathan De Guzman	5 ft 11 in (1.80 m)			Adamson

Coaches

Head coach

- (Philippines) Joel Banal

Assistant coach(es)

- (Philippines) Ariel Vanguardia
- (Philippines) Virgil Villavicencio
- (Philippines) Aric del Rosario

Legend

- (C) Team captain
- (I) Import
- Injured

== Game results ==
=== All-Filipino Cup ===
Date	Opponent	Score	Top scorer	Venue	Location
February 26	Shell	74–77		Philsports Arena	Pasig
March 2	Alaska	78–96	Alapag (24 pts)	Araneta Coliseum	Quezon City
March 9	San Miguel	83–79	Ravena (21 pts)	Araneta Coliseum	Quezon City
March 14	Sta.Lucia	72–71	Alapag (16 pts)	Philsports Arena	Pasig
March 21 (Ordered replay)	Brgy.Ginebra	117–122 2OT	Alapag (40 pts)	Araneta Coliseum	Quezon City
March 26	Shell	104–92	Taulava (46 pts)	Makati Coliseum	Makati City
March 29	Red Bull	88–94	Taulava (27 pts)		Cebu City
April 2	Purefoods	83–85		Philsports Arena	Pasig
April 9	FedEX	93–86 OT	Taulava (38 pts)	Philsports Arena	Pasig
April 12	Coca-Cola	78–79			San Fernando, Pampanga
April 16	Sta.Lucia	84–77		Philsports Arena	Pasig
April 22 (Replay)	Brgy.Ginebra	90–87	Alapag (26 pts)	Araneta Coliseum	Quezon City
April 25	Red Bull			Philsports Arena	Pasig
April 30	Alaska	89–88		Makati Coliseum	Makati City
May 4	Coca-Cola	91–87	Taulava (30 pts)	Araneta Coliseum	Quezon City
May 9	FedEx	105–116		Philsports Arena	Pasig
May 11	Brgy.Ginebra	82–99	Alapag (21 pts)	Araneta Coliseum	Quezon City
May 21	Purefoods			Philsports Arena	Pasig
May 28	San Miguel	102–106	Taulava (31 pts)	Philsports Arena	Pasig

Win
Win via OT
loss
loss via OT
