= 2003 PBA draft =

Player selection in Philippine basketball

General information
- Date(s): January 12, 2003
- Time: 3:00 pm
- Location: Glorietta Activity Center, Makati
- Network(s): NBN/IBC

Overview
- League: Philippine Basketball Association
- First selection: Mike Cortez (Alaska Aces)

The 2003 Philippine Basketball Association (PBA) rookie draft was an event at which teams drafted players from the amateur ranks. It was held on January 12, 2003, at the Glorietta Activity Center at Makati.

== Round 1 ==
*	Mythical team member	^{#}	All-star

Pick	Player	Country of origin*	PBA team	College
1	Mike Cortez*	Philippines	Alaska Aces (from FedEx)	De La Salle
2	Rommel Adducul*	Philippines	Barangay Ginebra Kings	San Sebastian
3	Eddie Laure	Philippines	Shell Turbo Chargers	Adamson
4	Harvey Carey*	United States	Talk 'N Text Tropang Texters	Sonoma State
5	Brandon Cablay^{#}	United States	Alaska Aces(from Sta. Lucia Realtors)	Vanguard
6	Billy Mamaril^{#}	United States	Purefoods Tender Juicy Hotdogs	Bakersfield
7	Enrico Villanueva*	Philippines	Red Bull Thunder	Ateneo de Manila
8	Marlon Legaspi	Philippines	San Miguel Beermen	MLQU
9	Reynel Hugnatan^{#}	Philippines	Coca-Cola Tigers	Manila
10	Jimmy Alapag*	United States	Talk 'N Text Tropang Texters (from Alaska Aces)	Cal State San Bernardino

== Round 2 ==
*	Mythical team member	^{#}	All-star

Pick	Player	Country of origin*	PBA team	College
11	Sunday Salvacion^{#}	Philippines	Barangay Ginebra Kings	St. Benilde
12	John Ferriols^{#}	Philippines	FedEx Express	San Jose
13	Adonis Sta. Maria	Philippines	Shell Turbo Chargers	La Salle-Manila
14	Cyrus Baguio*	Philippines	Red Bull Thunder	UST
15	Eugene Tejada	United States	Sta. Lucia Realtors (traded to Alaska Aces)	Chabot
16	Ronald Tubid^{#}	Philippines	Shell Turbo Chargers	East
17	Rysal Castro	Philippines	Red Bull Thunder	Far Eastern
18	Arnold Calo	Philippines	San Miguel Beermen	MLQU
19	Vincent San Diego	Philippines	Red Bull Thunder	La Salle-Manila
20	Leo Bat-Og	Philippines	Alaska Aces (traded to Sta. Lucia)	UNO-R

== Round 3 ==
Pick	Player	Country of origin*	PBA team	College
21	Bruce Dacia	Philippines	FedEx Express	Visayas
22	Rob Johnson	United States	Barangay Ginebra Kings	Bellevue
23	Ralph Rivera	Philippines	Shell Turbo Chargers	San Beda
24	Jenkins Mesina	Philippines	Purefoods Tender Juicy Hotdogs	UP Diliman
25	Ariel Capus	Philippines	Sta. Lucia Realtors	Jose Rizal University
26	William Kahi Villa	United States	Talk 'N Text Tropang Texters	BYU-Hawaii
27	Dustin Coloso	Philippines	Red Bull Thunder	Kean
28	Gec Chia	Philippines	Coca-Cola Tigers	Ateneo de Manila
29	Stephen Padilla	Philippines	Alaska Aces	Visayas

San Miguel passed in this round.

== Round 4 ==
Pick	Player	Country of origin*	PBA team	College
30	Kalani Ferreria	United States	FedEx Express	Moorpark
31	Dennis Madrid	Philippines	Shell Turbo Chargers	Adamson
32	Jerry Jaca	Philippines	Purefoods Tender Juicy Hotdogs	CIT
33	Richard Hardin	Philippines	Talk 'N Text Tropang Texters	Fort Hays State
34	Clarence Cole	United States	Red Bull Thunder	Santa Ana (CA)
35	Jeffrey Sanders	Philippines	Coca-Cola Tigers	TIP
36	Sunny Margate	Philippines	Alaska Aces	Skyline (CA)

Ginebra and Sta. Lucia passed in this round.

== Round 5 ==
Pick	Player	Country of origin*	PBA team	College
37	Mike Bravo	Philippines	FedEx Express	UP Diliman
38	Joseph Dominguez	Philippines	Purefoods Tender Juicy Hotdogs	Winnipeg
39	Ramil Ferma	Philippines	Red Bull Thunder	New Era University

Shell, Talk N' Text, Coke and Alaska passed in this round

== Round 6 ==
Pick	Player	Country of origin*	PBA team	College
40	Sanley de Castro	Philippines	Purefoods Tender Juicy Hotdogs	LA Harbor
