= 2004–05 Talk 'N Text Phone Pals season =

- Head coach: Joel Banal
- General manager: Frankie Lim
- Owners: Smart Communications (an MVP Group subsidiary)

Fiesta Conference (Transition) results
- Record: 17–9 (65.4%)
- Place: 3rd
- Playoff finish: Semifinals

Philippine Cup results
- Record: 18–10 (64.3%)
- Place: 2nd
- Playoff finish: Runner-up

Fiesta Conference results
- Record: 16–11 (59.3%)
- Place: 2nd
- Playoff finish: Runner-up

Talk 'N Text Phone Pals seasons

The 2004–2005 Talk 'N Text Phone Pals season was the 15th season of the franchise in the Philippine Basketball Association (PBA).

== Transactions ==
Transactions
Yancy De Ocampo ^{Acquired from FedEx in exchange for a first round pick}
Niño Gelig ^{Drafted rookie}
Willie Miller ^{Acquired from Red Bull via trade}
Allan Salangsang ^{Rookie free agent signed}
Don Camaso ^{Signed in the 2004–05 Philippine Cup}

== Occurrences ==
Game one of the 2004–05 Philippine Cup finals won by Talk 'N Text, 89–71 over the Barangay Ginebra Kings on January 30, were placed under protest when the Phone Pals violated the PBA's suspension on Asi Taulava which the board refused to lift despite a recent Quezon City court ruling ordering the PBA to reinstate the Phone Pals' top player, the league forfeited the series opener in favor of Barangay Ginebra.

== Roster ==
2004–05 Talk 'N Text Phone Pals roster
Players

Pos.	#	POB	Name	Height	Weight	DOB (YYYY–MM–DD)	From
G	1	(Philippines)	Bong Ravena	6 ft 1 in (1.85 m)			UE
G	3	(United States)	Jimmy Alapag	5 ft 9 in (1.75 m)			Cal State San Bernardino
F	4	(United States)	Harvey Carey	6 ft 3 in (1.91 m)			Sonoma State
G	8	(Philippines)	Patrick Fran	6 ft 0 in (1.83 m)			UST
G	11	(Philippines)	Willie Miller	5 ft 10 in (1.78 m)			Letran
F	13	(Philippines)	Mark Telan	6 ft 6 in (1.98 m)			De La Salle
G/F	14	(Philippines)	Niño Gelig	6 ft 2 in (1.88 m)			UST
C	18	(Philippines)	Yancy De Ocampo	6 ft 9 in (2.06 m)			Saint Francis of Assisi
F	20	(Philippines)	Don Camaso	6 ft 6 in (1.98 m)			Metro Manila Colleges
F	24	(Philippines)	Allan Salangsang	6 ft 5 in (1.96 m)			Letran
F	33	(Philippines)	Victor Pablo	6 ft 4 in (1.93 m)			Far Eastern
G	42	(Philippines)	Donbel Belano	5 ft 8 in (1.73 m)			Visayas
C	88	(Tonga)	Asi Taulava	6 ft 9 in (2.06 m)			BYU–Hawaii
G	99	(Philippines)	Jonathan De Guzman	5 ft 11 in (1.80 m)			Adamson
F	00	(United States)	Kahi Villa	6 ft 2 in (1.88 m)			BYU–Hawaii

Coaches

Head coach

- (Philippines) Joel Banal

Assistant coach(es)

- (Philippines) Ariel Vanguardia
- (Philippines) Virgil Villavicencio

Legend

- (C) Team captain
- Injured

== Philippine Cup ==
=== Game log ===
2005 PBA Philippine Cup game log
October

Game	Date	Opponent	Score	High points	High rebounds	High assists	Location Attendance	Record
1	October 3	San Miguel	93–89	Telan (20)			Araneta Coliseum	1–0
2	October 8	Alaska	94–86	Miller (22)			Makati Coliseum	2–0
3	October 13	FedEx	119–98	Taulava (22)			Araneta Coliseum	3–0
4	October 19	Purefoods	109–87	Miller (26)			Dumaguete	4–0
5	October 22	Coca Cola	96–77	Pablo (27)			Philsports Arena	5–0
6	October 27	Brgy.Ginebra	80–91	Miller (17)			Araneta Coliseum	5–1

November

Game	Date	Opponent	Score	High points	High rebounds	High assists	Location Attendance	Record
7	November 3	Shell	80–63				Araneta Coliseum	6–1
8	November 9	FedEx	103–93				Ormoc City	7–1
9	November 14	Purefoods	94–86	Miller (22)			Araneta Coliseum	8–1
10	November 18	Alaska	97–84				Cebu City	9–1
11	November 24	Red Bull	98–80				Cuneta Astrodome	10–1
12	November 30	Sta.Lucia	102–104	Miller (27)			Puerto Princesa	10–2

December

Game	Date	Opponent	Score	High points	High rebounds	High assists	Location Attendance	Record
13	December 5	Coca Cola	81–93	Telan (16)			Araneta Coliseum	10–3
14	December 8	Red Bull	96–105	Telan (26)			Philsports Arena	10–4
15	December 10	San Miguel	97–82	Telan (23)			Araneta Coliseum	11–4
16	December 15	Shell	98–103	Pablo (18)			Araneta Coliseum	11–5
17	December 19	Sta.Lucia	102–83	Alapag (20) De Ocampo (20)			Makati Coliseum	12–5
18	December 25	Brgy.Ginebra	102–108	Alapag (39)			Cuneta Astrodome	12–6

2004–05 schedule

== Recruited imports ==
Tournament	Name	#	Height	From	GP
2004 PBA Fiesta Conference	Randy Holcomb	23	6 ft 8 in (2.03 m)	San Diego State	6
2004 PBA Fiesta Conference	Jerald Honeycutt	40	6 ft 8 in (2.03 m)	Tulane University	20
2005 PBA Fiesta Conference	Jerald Honeycutt	40	6 ft 8 in (2.03 m)	Tulane University	22
2005 PBA Fiesta Conference	Earl Ike	50	6 ft 8 in (2.03 m)	Montevallo University	2
2005 PBA Fiesta Conference	Noel Felix		6 ft 8 in (2.03 m)	Fresno State	3

^{GP – Games played}
