= Ariel Vanguardia =

Filipino basketball coach (born 1972)

Vanguard Lions
- Position: Assistant coach
- League: Pacific West Conference

Personal information
- Born: September 29, 1972 (age 54)

Career information
- High school: Letran Calamba (Calamba, Laguna)
- College: De La Salle – Team B

Career history

Coaching
- 1998–1999: Manila Metrostars (assistant)
- 1998–1999: Benilde (assistant)
- 2000–2006: Mobiline/Talk 'N Text Phone Pals (assistant)
- 2003: Talk 'N Text Phone Pals (interim)
- 2006–2009: JRU
- 2009–2010: Barako Bull Energy Boosters (assistant)
- 2011–2016: Westports Malaysia Dragons
- 2016: Blu Star Detergent Dragons (consultant)
- 2016–2017: Phoenix Fuel Masters
- 2021–2023: Blackwater Bossing (interim)
- 2024: Manila Batang Sampaloc
- 2025–present: Vanguard University (assistant)

Career highlights
- As head coach: ABL Coach of the Year (2014); ABL champion (2015); As assistant coach: PBA champion (2003 All-Filipino)

Ariel Vanguardia (born September 29, 1972) is a Filipino professional basketball coach who currently serves as the assistant coach for the Vanguard Lions of the Pacific West Conference.

== Early life and education ==
Hailing from Calamba, Laguna, Ariel Vanguardia was born on September 29, 1972. Vanguardia attended the De La Salle University where he obtained a degree in business management. He played for the team B of the De La Salle Green Archers and was a contributor for the school paper, The LaSallian.

He briefly managed a printing press shop and a video rental store in 1996 until he began focusing on coaching.

== Coaching career ==
=== Assistant ===
Vanguardia formerly served as an assistant coach for Benilde Blazers under Adriano Go.

He served as an assistant coach for Talk 'N Text Phone Pals, and served as an interim when Joel Banal was coaching Ateneo. Vanguardia's tenure as interim marred of playing controversy, including players of the Phone Pals who intentionally playing or not scoring points.

=== JRU Heavy Bombers ===
He served as head coach of JRU Heavy Bombers, and led them into a finals appearance in 2008. But due to a final four fail in 2009, he was replaced by Vergel Meneses.

After coaching Bombers, he served as an assistant for Barako Bull from 2009 to 2010.

=== Westports Malaysia Dragons ===
He previously coached the Westports Malaysia Dragons in the Asean Basketball League, where he won the team's first championship in 2016. On May 31, 2016, it was announced that he was appointed to his first PBA head coaching job as coach of the PBA team Phoenix Fuel Masters, replacing Koy Banal.

=== Blu Detergent Dragons ===
He also took over as team consultant of Blu Star Detergent Dragons, a team composed of the players of the Dragons in the 2016 PBA D-League Foundation Cup.

=== Blackwater Bossing ===
In 2021, he was hired by Blackwater Bossing as their head coach, replacing Nash Racela but for interim basis. He was replaced by Jefferey Cariaso in 2023.

=== Assistant for Atlanta Hawks ===
For the 2024 NBA Summer League, Vanguardia became part of the Atlanta Hawks as an assistant coach and scout.

=== Vanguard Lions ===
Vanguardia was named part of the staff of the Vanguard Lions for the 2025–26 season.

== Coaching record ==
=== Collegiate record ===
Season	Team	Elimination round					Playoffs				
Season	Team	Finish	GP	W	L	PCT	PG	W	L	PCT	Results
2006	JRU	7th	14	4	10	.286	—	—	—	—	Eliminated
2007	JRU	3rd	14	7	5	.583	1	0	1	.000	Semifinals
2008	JRU	2nd	14	9	5	.643	6	4	2	.667	Finals
2009	JRU	3rd	18	15	3	.833	2	1	1	.500	Semifinals
Totals			58	35	23	.603	9	5	4	.555	0 championships

=== Professional ===
Season	Conference	Team	GP	W	L	PCT	Finish	PG	W	L	PCT	Results
2003	Invitational	Talk 'N Text	4	3	1	.750	3rd	—	—	—	—	Eliminated
2003	Reinforced	Talk 'N Text	13	7	6	.538	4th (Group B)	7	3	4	.429	Third place
2012		Westports Malaysia Dragons	21	11	10	.524	4th	3	1	2	.333	Semifinals
2013		Westports Malaysia Dragons	22	12	10	.545	3rd	3	0	3	.000	Semifinals
2014		Westports Malaysia Dragons	20	15	5	.750	1st	4	2	2	.500	Finals
2015–16		Westports Malaysia Dragons	20	16	4	.800	1st	7	5	2	.714	Champions
2015–16	Governors'	Phoenix	11	5	6	.455	8th	1	0	1	.000	Quarterfinals
2016–17	Philippine	Phoenix	11	6	5	.545	6th	2	0	2	.000	Quarterfinals
2016–17	Commissioner's Cup	Phoenix	11	4	7	.364	7th	1	0	1	.000	Quarterfinals
2016–17	Governors'	Phoenix	11	2	9	.182	9th	—	—	—	—	Eliminated
2021	Philippine	Blackwater	11	0	11	.000	12th	—	—	—	—	Eliminated
2021	Governors'	Blackwater	11	1	10	.538	12th	—	—	—	—	Eliminated
2022–23	Philippine	Blackwater	11	5	6	.455	8th	1	0	1	.000	Quarterfinals
2022–23	Commissioner's	Blackwater	12	3	9	.250	12th	—	—	—	—	Eliminated
2022–23	Governors'	Blackwater	11	1	10	.091	12th	—	—	—	—	Eliminated
PBA total			117	37	80	.316	Playoff Total	12	3	9	.250	1 ABL championship
ABL total			83	54	29	.651	Playoff Total	17	8	9	.471	0 PBA championships
Career total			200	91	109	.455	Playoff Total	29	11	18	.379	1 championship
