= Jimmy Alapag =

Filipino-American basketball player and coach (born 1977)

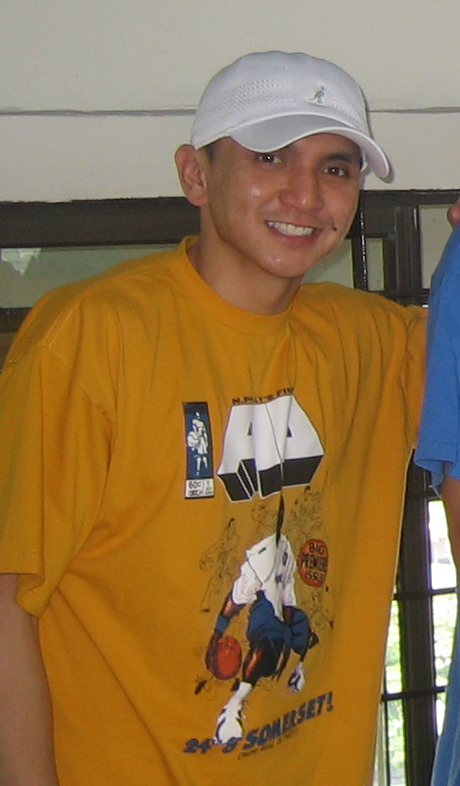
- Alapag in 2006

NLEX Road Warriors
- Title: Head coach
- League: PBA

Personal information
- Born: December 30, 1977 (age 48) San Bernardino, California, U.S.
- Listed height: 5 ft 9 in (1.75 m)
- Listed weight: 160 lb (73 kg)

Career information
- High school: Upland (Upland, California)
- College: University of La Verne (1996–1997); Santa Ana College (1997–1998); Cal State San Bernardino (1998–2000)
- PBA draft: 2003: 1st round, 10th overall pick
- Drafted by: Talk 'N Text Phone Pals
- Playing career: 2003–2016
- Position: Point guard
- Number: 3, 4, 6, 7, and 17
- Coaching career: 2015–present

Career history

Playing
- 2003–2015: Talk 'N Text Tropang Texters
- 2015–2016: Meralco Bolts

Coaching
- 2015: Philippines (assistant)
- 2016–2017: Meralco Bolts (assistant)
- 2017: Philippines (assistant)
- 2017–2020: San Miguel Alab Pilipinas
- 2019–2020: San Miguel Beermen (assistant)
- 2019: Philippines (assistant)
- 2021–2023: Stockton Kings (assistant)
- 2023–2026: Sacramento Kings (player development coach)
- 2026–present: NLEX Road Warriors

Career highlights
- As player: 6× PBA champion (2003 All-Filipino, 2009 Philippine, 2011 Philippine, 2011 Commissioner's, 2012 Philippine, 2013 Philippine); 2× PBA Finals MVP (2011 Philippine, 2011 Commissioner's); PBA Most Valuable Player (2011); PBA Best Player of the Conference (2011 Commissioner's); 11× PBA All-Star (2003–2011, 2014, 2015); PBA All-Star Game MVP (2004); 3× PBA Mythical First Team (2003, 2005, 2011); PBA Rookie of the Year (2003); PBA Order of Merit (2010); 2× PBA 3-Point Shootout champion (2003, 2005); 50 Greatest Players in PBA History (2015 selection); No. 3 retired by the TNT Tropang Giga; As head coach: ABL champion (2018); As assistant coach: 2× PBA champion (2019 Philippine, 2019 Commissioner's); As executive: PBA champion (2015 Commissioner's)
Medals
Men's basketball
Philippines
FIBA Asia Championship
Silver medal – second place	2013 Manila	Team
William Jones Cup
Bronze medal – third place	2007 Taipei	Team
Silver medal – second place	2015 Taipei	Team
Assistant coach for Philippines
SEABA Championship
Gold medal – first place	2015 Singapore	Team
Gold medal – first place	2017 Quezon City	Team
SEA Games
Gold medal – first place	2017 Kuala Lumpur	Team
Gold medal – first place	2019 Philippines	Team

Jim Olmedo Alapag (born December 30, 1977) is a Filipino-American professional basketball coach and former player. He serves as a head coach for the NLEX Road Warriors of the Philippine Basketball Association (PBA). He is nicknamed "the Mighty Mouse" and "the Captain".

== Early life and amateur career ==
Alapag is the youngest of six siblings, and his parents are both Filipino immigrants from Leyte. He was born and raised in San Bernardino, California. He said his greatest influence in playing basketball was his father and older brother Crispin. He started playing basketball at the age of 3. In high school, he was only 4'9" in his freshman year. He almost quit basketball in his second year, but his high school coach convinced him to keep working. In his senior year at Upland High, he averaged 15 points and nine assists.

He first played collegiate basketball at the University of La Verne. He then transferred to a junior college and thereafter transferred to California State University, San Bernardino. He established himself as a clutch three-point shooter for Cal-State San Bernardino. In 2002, he had his first crack of Philippine basketball when he was invited by then-national team coach Jong Uichico to try out for the Philippine National Team bound for 2002 Asian Games in Busan, South Korea. He made the team but missed documents and a hand injury kept him from playing.

== Professional career ==
=== Talk 'N Text Tropang Texters ===
==== 2003: Rookie season ====
Alapag was selected 10th overall pick in the 2003 PBA draft by the Talk 'N Text Phone Pals and was considered the "steal of the draft". A hand injury had lowered his draft stock. He then signed a contract worth P11 million. In a game against Ginebra, he was selected for his first All-Star game and also won the Three-Point shootout during that year's All-Star Weekend. Later on, Alapag and slotman Asi Taulava led the Phone Pals to the All-Filipino Cup Championship by beating the Coca-Cola Tigers in the finals, after overcoming the 0–2 deficit to the Tigers and winning the last four games in the series to capture its first ever title. In the Reinforced Conference, they finished in 3rd place overall after being swept in the semifinals. At the end of the 2003 season, he won the Rookie of the Year award by a huge margin after averaging 14.5 points, 7.02 assists and 6.54 rebounds per outing while shooting 35.4 percent from the three-point region.

==== 2004–05 season ====
In the 2004–05 PBA season, Alapag won his second mythical first team selection and co-MVP honors with teammate Taulava in the All-Star Game held in Cebu. He also scored his career-high of 39 points in a Christmas Day loss. He also led the Phone Pals to two straight finals appearances but failed to win another championship against the Barangay Ginebra Kings in the Philippine Cup and against San Miguel Beermen in the Fiesta Conference.

==== 2005–2008 seasons ====
In a win over San Miguel during the 2005 Fiesta Conference, Alapag had 12 assists. He then missed consecutive three pointers in the last 17 seconds of a game against Red Bull Barako that led to Talk 'N Text falling to third place. Talk 'N Text fell to the Air21 Express in the quarterfinals.

Talk 'N Text then started the 2006–07 Philippine Cup with three straight wins, with their third coming against the Welcoat Dragons from an all-around performance from Alapag, who had eight assists, seven points, three rebounds and one steal. That conference, they lost in the semifinals to Ginebra. In the Fiesta Conference, they made it all the way to the finals, where they lost to the Alaska Aces in seven games.

Talk 'N Text then started the 2007–08 Philippine Cup with a record of 2–1, with their second coming against Ginebra from a 17-point performance from Alapag. Later that season, they lost to Air21, in which he missed a game-tying three pointer in the final seconds of the game. Several days later, he lost his running mate Taulava in a trade with Coca-Cola, but gained a new frontcourt partner in Ali Peek. Talk 'N Text fell to the wildcard phase after finishing the conference 9–9. They were eliminated by Coca-Cola in that phase. During the 2008 Fiesta Conference, he had 25 points in a win over Air21. He finished 2nd in the league in assists with 5.9 a game.

==== 2008–2011 seasons ====
Talk 'N Text would reload in the offseason with top rookies Jared Dilinger and Jayson Castro. They would win their first game of the season against Coca-Cola, in which Alapag hit a clutch free throw after the Tigers called too many timeouts. Against the Purefoods Tender Juicy Giants, he had a costly turnover off a pass to Renren Ritualo with 30 seconds left in the game. This left enough time for Purefoods guard Chico Lanete to make the game-winning shot, and give Talk 'N Text their third straight loss. Later that conference, he scored 20 points in a win over SMB. Talk 'N Text reached the 2008–09 PBA Philippine Cup finals, where he would add another championship ring by helping the Tropang Texters vanquish the Aces in a seven-game series. He was then named as one of the starters for the 2009 PBA All-Star Games. In the Fiesta Conference, he led the league in assists with 6.3 a game.

In a 2009–10 Philippine Cup win over Coca-Cola, Alapag had 21 points, three rebounds, and three assists. He then had a season-high 25 points, with 10 of those points coming in the midst of a 21–0 blast from TNT, as they overcame a 15-point deficit in the last eight minutes of the game to get the comeback win over Barako. He then made a game-winning layup against SMB as TNT closed the elimination round with a record of 11–7. They were eliminated by Ginebra in five games, which included TNT forfeiting Game 4 after what they perceived to be biased officiating in favor of Ginebra. Later that season, he was selected to be part of the Three Point Shootout and the All-Star Game during the 2010 All-Star Weekend. In the second round of the Fiesta Conference eliminations, he became the 23rd player in league history to total more than 2000 assists. He was also awarded Player of the Week along with his teammate Kelly Williams, who TNT had acquired midway through the conference. He got another Player of the Week award several weeks later as Talk 'N Text won 13 straight games and an automatic semifinals berth. They lost in the semis to Alaska led by import Diamon Simpson.

Alapag scored 27 points in a win over SMB as they took the early lead in the standings of the 2010 Philippine Cup with 2–0. He then had a season-high 33 points with 10 assists in a win over Barako, earning himself a Player of the Week award. He then led Talk 'N Text to another championship in the 2010–11 PBA Philippine Cup finals against San Miguel after beating the Beermen 4 games to 2 and shared the Finals MVP honors with Castro. During the 2011 Commissioner's Cup playoffs, he had a bout with fever. He recovered enough to send Talk 'N Text past the semis against Air21. In the 2011 PBA Commissioner's Cup finals, he once again led the Tropang Texters to their back-to-back championships, this time against Brgy. Ginebra, with him and Castro again both awarded as co-finals MVP. He was then selected once again to take part in both the All-Star Game and the Three Point Shootout during the 2011 All-Star Weekend. His team made it again in the 2011 PBA Governors' Cup finals only to lose to the Petron Blaze Boosters in seven games. At season's end, he was minted as the season's Most Valuable Player, beating the likes of Arwind Santos and Mark Caguioa in the MVP race.

==== 2011–2015 seasons and retirement ====
Alapag, along with Williams and Ranidel De Ocampo, missed the start of Talk 'N Text's season as they were given rest by the team after coming off a 4th place stint in the FIBA Asia Cup 2011. His rest lasted until November, as he also dealt with calf and ankle injuries. He made his debut during the 2011–12 PBA Philippine Cup, in which he had 15 points and 11 assists, but cramped out in the last 4:40 of the game and had to watch his team lose to the B-Meg Derby Ace Llamados. He became the fourth player with 900 threes in a win over Alaska while scoring 21 points. In the playoffs, Alapag helped Talk 'N Text beat their nemesis, Petron Blaze in seven games after overcoming a 1–3 deficit in their best-of-seven semi-final series. The series also saw him drop 29 points, 10 assists, and seven rebounds in Game 6. In the finals, his team successfully defended the Philippine Cup trophy by beating the Gary David-led Powerade Tigers, four games to one. In the 2012 PBA Commissioner's Cup, he helped the Tropang Texters advance to the finals against Barako despite dealing with his father being diagnosed with cancer and his brother suffering a stroke. There, they went against the Llamados, only to lose the series in seven games.

Alapag suffered a calf strain during the 2012–13 Philippine Cup, but recovered in time to guide Talk 'N Text to a 3–0 start. He then led Talk 'N Text to a 29-point victory over the San Mig Coffee Mixers with 19 points, four rebounds, and five assists. The following game, he scored 18 points with six assists, assuring the Tropang Texters of an automatic semifinals seat. These performances off the bench earned him a Player of the Week award. In the semis, he helped Talk 'N Text get past Alaska in six games. In the finals he led the Tropang Texters' sweep of the Rain or Shine Elasto Painters four games to none, retaining the Philippine Cup for the third time (they also took permanent possession of the Jun Bernardino Trophy). He dedicated the championship to his father, who had recovered from his cancer. While practicing with the Philippine national team, he injured his calf, which ruled him out for Game 3 of their Commissioner's Cup series against Ginebra, and limited his playing time in Game 5. Ginebra went on to finish the series in five gruelling games. After his stint with the national team and spending time in the US, he rejoined the team during the Governors' Cup. They had their worst loss of the season against Petron, who beat them 131–96. They then lost to Ginebra for the final playoff spot. This was Talk 'N Text's first time not making the playoffs since the 2009 Fiesta Conference.

During the 2013–14 Philippine Cup, Alapag became the 9th player with at least 3,000 assists when he got six assists with his 17 points in a win over the GlobalPort Batang Pier. They ended the conference elimination round with the fourth seed, which was low for a team chasing a four-peat in the Philippine Cup. They were knocked out by eventual champions San Mig Coffee. In the Commissioner's Cup, they started the conference with two straight wins and claimed the solo lead. They finished the elimination round with a perfect record of 9–0. They then defeated Ginebra in the quarterfinals and swept Rain or Shine in the semis. In Game 1 of the finals, he had more turnovers (five) than points (three), which led to Talk 'N Text's winning streak ending. He continued struggling in Game 3, and Talk 'N Text lost the series in Game 4. In the Governors' Cup, he led the team with 15 points and five assists in a win over Rain or Shine. He then had a conference-high 18 points on five triples in a win over the Beermen. In the best-of-five semis, they were down 0–2 to San Mig Coffee. The Tropang Texters rallied to win Games 3 and 4, before losing in Game 5.

Before the start of the 2014–15 season, Alapag signed a one-year deal to stay with Talk 'N Text. As he was coming off national team duty, Talk 'N Text allowed him to recover. He made his season debut in a win over the Kia Sorento. He had 14 points on four treys, four assists, and two steals in a win over Barako. On December 3, 2014 it was announced that he had made the PBA's "40 Greatest Players" list. On December 23, 2014, he passed Ronnie Magsanoc to move to No. 2 behind Allan Caidic in the all-time three-point list with 1,172 three point field goals made. He only played limited minutes in the playoffs to give way to the other guards on the team. They were eliminated by the Beermen in the semis.

On January 9, 2015, Alapag formally announced his retirement during a press conference at the Smart Araneta Coliseum prior to the second game of the 2014–15 PBA Philippine Cup finals between the Aces and the Beermen. He competed in the Three Point Shootout one last time. His #3 jersey was retired by Talk 'N Text on March 8, 2015, during the halftime of the 2015 PBA All-Star Game. For his supposed final PBA game, he played for the South All-Star Team for 2015 PBA All Star, where he scored 12 points and dished out 17 assists.

Alapag served as the Gilas Pilipinas assistant coach and served as the Tropang Texters' team manager. He was also appointed as a member of the FIBA Players Commission which he served from 2014 to 2019. He was also part of the team that made a bid for the Philippines to host the 2019 FIBA World Cup.

=== Meralco Bolts ===
==== Coming out of retirement and return to basketball ====
On August 7, 2015, Alapag came out of retirement and was traded by the Talk 'N Text Tropang Texters to the Blackwater Elite in exchange for Larry Rodriguez and then to the Meralco Bolts for Mike Cortez and James Sena. He signed a two-year deal with the Meralco Bolts worth P10.08 million. As one of Meralco's veterans, he mentored rookies Baser Amer and Chris Newsome, and third-year guard Anjo Caram.

==== 2015–16 season ====
Alapag made his season debut for Meralco with six points and eight assists in a loss to SMB. He sat out several games during the 2015–16 Philippine Cup due to a rib injury. In a game against the Mahindra Enforcer, he had a chance to send the game into overtime, but his three-point shot was blocked by LA Revilla. He had eight assists in a loss to Alaska, which tied him with Willie Generalao for fifth all-time in assists. In a matchup against Terrence Romeo of GlobalPort, he scored 15 of his 18 points in the fourth quarter, but Romeo had a game-high 33 points and the win. Meralco finished the conference with a lowly 1–10 record.

Alapag then missed two games of the Commissioner's Cup due to a pulled hamstring, but Meralco was able to start the season 4–0. Meralco was able to clinch one of the twice-to beat incentives in a win over Alaska, in which he had 16 points on eight-of-ten shooting from the free throw line. Meralco made it to the semis, where they faced Alaska. In Game 3, he had 12 points and four assists, but Alaska blew them out. He then had a hand injury in Meralco's do or die Game 5, and the Bolts went on to fall short in that game, ending their conference.

In the Governors' Cup, Meralco made it to the playoffs, where they faced TNT in the semis, his former team. In Game 2, Alapag scored 16 points off the bench (with 12 coming in the fourth quarter) and four assists as Meralco tied the series. They took the series lead in Game 3, in which he had 17 points on three triples. Meralco closed out the series in Game 4, making it to the finals for the first time in franchise history. In the finals, they faced Ginebra. In a Game 1 win, he scored 13 points (with 10 in the fourth quarter) and made a clutch triple that not only gave Meralco the lead, but also tied him with Caidic on the all-time three-pointers made list. He officially broke Caidic's record on October 9, 2016 in Game 2, but Meralco lost that game. In Game 3, he and Meralco veteran Reynel Hugnatan combined for seven treys in the fourth quarter that led to Meralco taking the series lead. However, Ginebra won the championship in Game 6.

==== Formal retirement in the PBA ====
On November 3, 2016, Alapag announced in a YouTube video by Alaska Aces player Eric Menk that he will no longer play for the Meralco Bolts in the 2016–17 PBA season hence his formal retirement in the PBA at the age of 39, after playing for 13 years for the Talk N' Text and Meralco teams.

== Coaching career ==
=== Gilas Pilipinas, Talk 'N Text, Meralco, and San Miguel ===
After retiring from international basketball, Alapag was quickly tapped by then-Gilas Pilipinas head coach Tab Baldwin as one of the team's assistant coaches. Alapag also served as the team manager for the Talk 'N Text Tropang Texters. He left those positions once he unretired for the Meralco Bolts.

After the 2015–16 season, Alapag became an assistant coach for Meralco. He also became an assistant coach for Gilas Pilipinas once again, this time under Chot Reyes. He was also an assistant coach for the Gilas team that competed in the 2019 SEA Games under Coach Tim Cone.

In 2019, Alapag became one of the assistant coaches for the San Miguel Beermen.

=== Alab Pilipinas ===
On August 12, 2017, Alapag announced through his Instagram account that he will be the new head coach for Alab Pilipinas of the ASEAN Basketball League. This was Alapag's first major coaching role since his retirement from basketball. He coached his team to the finals, defeating the Mono Vampire Basketball Club of Thailand in five games, and winning his first ABL championship.

In his second season, they failed to defend their title, falling to the Hong Kong Eastern Long Lions in the playoffs.

In his third season, Alab had a 10–6 record before the ABL season was canceled due to the COVID-19 pandemic. He then left for the US.

=== Sacramento and Stockton Kings ===
In 2019, Alapag reached out to the Sacramento Kings' general manager Vlade Divac for a coaching opportunity. Divac offered him a position to help coach the Summer League squad, which he accepted.

He didn't coach the next season due to the Stockton Kings not fielding a G-League team for that season, but returned the next season to be an assistant coach for the Sacramento Kings' Summer League team, where they won the 2021 Summer League championship. He was then named as an assistant coach for the Stockton Kings following their successful Summer League campaign.

In August 2023, Alapag was promoted to become the Sacramento Kings' player development coach. He left his role on April 15, 2026.

=== NLEX ===
On June 29, 2026, Alapag signed as the head coach of the NLEX Road Warriors, succeeding Jong Uichico. He is set to make his head coaching debut in the PBA at the 2026 Governors' Cup.

== National team career ==
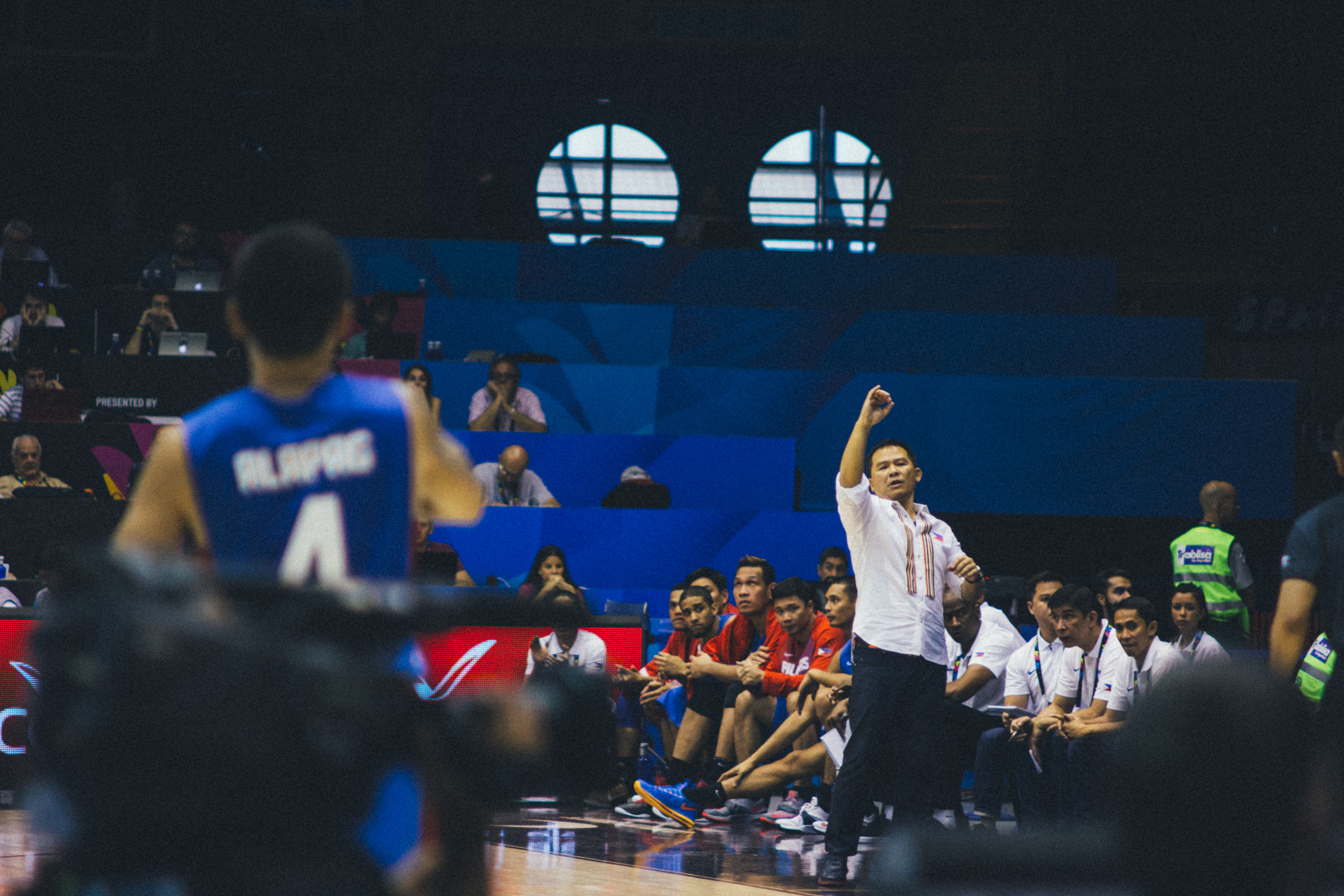
Alapag (left) at the 2014 FIBA Basketball World Cup.

Alapag first saw action for the Philippines national team in the 2007 FIBA Asia Championship in Tokushima, Japan where they finished 9th overall. He wasn't chosen by Coach Yeng Guiao for the 2009 FIBA Asia Championship. He returned to action in the FIBA Asia Cup 2011 in Wuhan, China, where this time, he helped guide a young Gilas Pilipinas to the top 4. In 2013, he helped Gilas win a silver medal in the FIBA Asia championship, qualifying them for the 2014 FIBA World Cup, with him hitting a clutch three-pointer in their game against South Korea.

Alapag played at the 2014 FIBA Basketball World Cup stint in Spain. He helped his team to win its first World Cup victory for the first time in 40 years, in beating Senegal with his 18 points. He also hit four three-pointers in the clutch to nearly steal a win against Argentina, who were ranked #3 in the world at the time. Despite his announcement of retiring from the national team after playing in the World Cup, he accepted another offer after Jayson Castro was declared unable to play for the Asian Games in Incheon. During the tournament, the national team was expected to win gold because of their performance in the World Cup, but they lost three games in a row against Iran, Qatar, and the host, South Korea, respectively. At the end of the tournament, he retired from international basketball.

== PBA career statistics ==
Legend
GP	Games played	MPG	Minutes per game
FG%	Field-goal percentage	3P%	3-point field-goal percentage	FT%	Free-throw percentage
RPG	Rebounds per game	APG	Assists per game	SPG	Steals per game
BPG	Blocks per game	PPG	Points per game	**Bold**	Career high

=== Season-by-season averages ===
Year	Team	GP	MPG	FG%	3P%	FT%	RPG	APG	SPG	BPG	PPG
2003	Talk 'N Text	54	**37.6**	.222	.354	.753	**6.5**	7.0	**.9**	.0	14.5
2004–05	Talk 'N Text	**77**	34.0	.407	.360	.764	5.5	5.8	.6	.0	14.3
2005–06	Talk 'N Text	41	35.2	.382	.335	.786	5.4	**8.1**	.6	.0	13.1
2006–07	Talk 'N Text	28	31.2	.420	.347	.741	4.9	6.9	.5	.0	11.5
2007–08	Talk 'N Text	39	30.8	.421	.361	.797	6.0	5.9	.6	.0	13.5
2008–09	Talk 'N Text	46	31.8	.412	.406	.823	3.8	5.0	.7	.0	**14.9**
2009–10	Talk 'N Text	47	32.1	.333	.360	.826	2.6	6.5	.5	.0	14.0
2010–11	Talk 'N Text	63	30.3	.379	.349	.841	2.9	5.4	.5	.0	12.4
2011–12	Talk 'N Text	52	28.1	.383	.348	.769	2.4	5.5	.3	.0	10.7
2012–13	Talk 'N Text	49	26.4	.396	.370	.878	1.9	4.8	.4	.0	10.2
2013–14	Talk 'N Text	46	25.6	.380	.324	.896	2.1	4.5	.3	.0	8.3
2014–15	Talk 'N Text	12	15.3	**.543**	**.485**	**.929**	2.2	2.3	.6	.0	6.6
2015–16	Meralco	47	22.5	.410	.367	.833	1.6	4.0	.4	.0	7.5
Career		601	30.3	.374	.360	.803	3.8	5.7	.5	.0	12.1

== Playing style ==
Jimmy Alapag earned recognition for his clutch three-point shooting, playmaking, and late-game decision-making. He leveraged his speed and agility to overcome his size disadvantage against defenders. Known for an impressive 40-inch vertical leap early in his career, he recorded only one dunk during his time in the PBA. Beyond his athletic skills, his communication, strong work ethic, and mentorship of younger players established him as a highly respected leader on and off the court.

== Personal life ==
Alapag's parents are Filipino immigrants Crispin and Aurora Alapag. He's the youngest of six siblings. He considers his father as well as his elder brother Crispin Jr. as his two greatest influences in basketball.

In August 2010, Alapag married Filipina actress Lari Jean “LJ” Moreno, the daughter of Ruel Ricafort and Debra Lacsamana, Alma Moreno's sister. Her sibling is Francis Ricafort. Officiant Pastor Robert Johnson performed the sunset christian wedding at the Catalina Terrace of Surf and Sand Resort in Laguna Beach, California. They were blessed with three children, Ian Maximus (whom they adopted), Keona Skye, and Calen Asher. In 2023, they welcomed their fourth child, Cayson Amory. They run a YouTube channel, Alapag Family Fun, which currently is close to 200,000 subscribers. In 2019, they were baptized before they moved to the US in 2020.
