= 2005–06 Talk 'N Text Phone Pals season =

- Head coach: Joel Banal; Derrick Pumaren (Philippine Cup)
- General Manager: Frankie Lim; Virgil Villavicencio (assistant)
- Owner(s): Smart Communications (an MVP Group subsidiary)

Fiesta Conference results
- Record: 12–10 (54.5%)
- Place: 5th
- Playoff finish: Quarterfinals

Philippine Cup results
- Record: 6–13 (31.6%)
- Place: 8th
- Playoff finish: Wildcard

Talk 'N Text Phone Pals seasons

The 2005–06 Talk 'N Text Phone Pals season was the 16th season of the franchise in the Philippine Basketball Association (PBA).

== Key dates ==
- August 14: The 2005 PBA Draft took place in Sta. Lucia East Grand Mall, Cainta, Rizal.
- February 12, 2006: Derrick Pumaren was officially appointed as new Phone Pals' coach replacing Joel Banal. Pumaren served as consultant for the first conference.

== Draft picks ==
Round	Pick	Player	Height	Position	Nationality	College
2	18	Mark Macapagal	6'2"	Guard	Philippines	San Sebastian

== Roster ==
2005–06 Talk 'N Text Phone Pals roster
Players

Pos.	#	POB	Name	Height	Weight	DOB (YYYY–MM–DD)	From
G	3	(United States)	Jimmy Alapag	5 ft 9 in (1.75 m)	160 lb (73 kg)	1977-12-30	Cal State San Bernardino
F	4	(United States)	Harvey Carey	6 ft 3 in (1.91 m)	210 lb (95 kg)	1979-03-18	Sonoma State
F/C	7	(United States)	Jay Washington	6 ft 7 in (2.01 m)	220 lb (100 kg)	1981-11-10	Eckerd
F	8	(Philippines)	Vergel Meneses	6 ft 3 in (1.91 m)	195 lb (88 kg)	1969-01-14	José Rizal
G	13	(Philippines)	Anton Villoria	5 ft 11 in (1.80 m)			Letran
SG	14	(Philippines)	Renren Ritualo	6 ft 0 in (1.83 m)	178 lb (81 kg)	1979-06-14	De La Salle
C	15	(Philippines)	Chris Cantonjos	6 ft 6 in (1.98 m)	197 lb (89 kg)	1974-09-22	UST
G	17	(Philippines)	Mark Cardona	6 ft 1 in (1.85 m)	180 lb (82 kg)	1981-11-03	De La Salle
F/C	32	(Philippines)	Poch Juinio	6 ft 5 in (1.96 m)	215 lb (98 kg)	1973-05-25	UP Diliman
F	33	(Philippines)	Victor Pablo	6 ft 4 in (1.93 m)	200 lb (91 kg)	1970-08-08	Far Eastern
F/C	41	(Philippines)	Don Allado	6 ft 6 in (1.98 m)	225 lb (102 kg)	1977-06-10	De La Salle
G	42	(Philippines)	Donbel Belano	5 ft 8 in (1.73 m)	178 lb (81 kg)	1976-12-24	Visayas
C	88	(Tonga)	Asi Taulava	6 ft 9 in (2.06 m)	245 lb (111 kg)	1973-03-02	BYU–Hawaii
G		(Philippines)	Patrick Fran	6 ft 0 in (1.83 m)	175 lb (79 kg)	1973-04-13	UST
F	8	(United States)	Darvin Ham (I)	6 ft 7 in (2.01 m)	240 lb (109 kg)	1973-07-23	Texas Tech
F	21	(United States)	Damian Cantrell (I)	6 ft 5 in (1.96 m)	233 lb (106 kg)	1976-05-17	San Francisco

Coaches

Head coach

- (Philippines) Derrick Pumaren

Assistant coach(es)

- (Philippines) Franz Pumaren
- (Philippines) Bong Ramos
- (United States) Dan Rose (conditioning)
- (Philippines) Agustin Tiongco
- (Philippines) Tonichi Yturri

Legend

- (C) Team captain
- (I) Import
- Injured

== Fiesta Conference ==
=== Game log ===
2006 PBA Fiesta Conference game log
October

Game	Date	Opponent	Score	High points	High rebounds	High assists	Location Attendance	Record
1	October 7	San Miguel	74–66	Cantrell (18)			Ynares Center	1–0
2	October 12	Air21	109–91	Cantrell (25)			Ynares Center	2–0
3	October 19	Sta. Lucia	87–80				Araneta Coliseum	3–0
4	October 21	San Miguel	82–81	Alapag (23)			Araneta Coliseum	4–0
5	October 26	Brgy.Ginebra	94–100				Araneta Coliseum	4–1
6	October 30	Purefoods	96–82	Cantrell, Pablo (17)			Araneta Coliseum	5–1

November

Game	Date	Opponent	Score	High points	High rebounds	High assists	Location Attendance	Record
7	November 4	Air21	88–90	Cantrell (26)			Ynares Center	5–2
8	November 6	Alaska	101–79	Cantrell (19)			Araneta Coliseum	6–2
9	November 12	Sta.Lucia	97–100	Cantrell, 2 others (20)			Zamboanga City	6–3
10	November 18	Red Bull	89–91	Cantrell (21)			Ynares Center	6–4
11	November 20	Red Bull	92–99	Cantrell (21)			Cuneta Astrodome	6–5

December

Game	Date	Opponent	Score	High points	High rebounds	High assists	Location Attendance	Record
12	December 7	Purefoods	93–89 OT				Ynares Center	7–5
13	December 11	Coca Cola	67–73	Taulava (13)			Ynares Center	7–6
14	December 17	Alaska	92–84	Cantrell (26)			Balanga, Bataan	8–6
15	December 21	Brgy.Ginebra	92–97	Cantrell (21)			Cuneta Astrodome	8–7
16	December 23	San Miguel	94–73				Cuneta Astrodome	9–7

2005–06 schedule

== Transactions ==
=== Pre-season ===
Players Added

Via Free Agency

- Leo Avenido (From Coca Cola Tigers)

Via Trade

- Jay Washington (From Air21 Express)
- Mark Cardona (From Air21 Express)
Players Lost

Via Trade

- Yancy De Ocampo (To Air21 Express)
- Patrick Fran (To Air21 Express)

=== Additions ===
Player	Signed	Former team
Chris Cantonjos	March 2006	
John Ferriols	March 2006	Air21 Express
Poch Juinio	March 2006	Coca Cola Tigers
Vergel Meneses	March 2006	Red Bull Barako
Anton Villoria	March 2006	San Miguel Beermen

=== Subtractions ===
Player	Signed	New team
Niño Gelig	N/A	

=== Trades ===
March, 2006	To Talk 'N Text John Ferriols	To Air21 Express Mark Telan
May 8, 2006	To Talk 'N Text Don Allado	To Alaska Aces Willie Miller, John Ferriols
May 8, 2006	To Talk 'N Text Renren Ritualo, Patrick Fran	To Air21 Express Leo Avenido
