= 2003 PBA Invitational championship =

- Duration: July 27 – August 23, 2003
- TV partner(s): NBN/IBC

Finals
- Champions: Alaska Aces
- Runners-up: Coca Cola Tigers

Awards
- Best Player: Ali Peek (Alaska Aces)
- Finals MVP: Brandon Cablay (Alaska Aces)

PBA Invitational championship chronology
- < 1984

PBA conference chronology
- < 2003 All-Filipino 2003 Reinforced >

The 2003 Philippine Basketball Association (PBA) Samsung-Invitational championship, was the second conference of the 2003 PBA season. It started on July 27 and ended on August 23, 2003. The tournament features three guest foreign teams from Korea, China and Yugoslavia along with the Philippine national team.

The Alaska Aces captured their 11th PBA title by beating the Coca Cola Tigers, 2-1, in their best-of-three finals series.

Brandon Cablay won on his first Finals MVP in Invitational Cup championship.

== Qualification ==
=== PBA Philippine Cup ===
- Top 5 teams qualify outright
- Bottom 5 teams proceed to last chance qualifying via Mabuhay Cup

Pos	Team	W	L	PCT	GB	Qualification
1	Batang Red Bull Thunder	14	4	.778	—	Qualify to Invitational tournament
2	San Miguel Beermen	12	6	.667	2	Qualify to Invitational tournament
3	Coca-Cola Tigers	11	7	.611	3	Qualify to Invitational tournament
4	Talk 'N Text Phone Pals	10	8	.556	4	Qualify to Invitational tournament
5	FedEx Express	10	8	.556	4	Qualify to Invitational tournament
6	Alaska Aces	9	9	.500	5	Proceed to Mabuhay Cup
7	Sta. Lucia Realtors	8	10	.444	6	Proceed to Mabuhay Cup
8	Barangay Ginebra Kings	6	12	.333	8	Proceed to Mabuhay Cup
9	Shell Turbo Chargers	5	13	.278	9	Proceed to Mabuhay Cup
10	Purefoods TJ Hotdogs	5	13	.278	9	Proceed to Mabuhay Cup

Source: PBA.ph

=== Samsung-PBA Mabuhay Cup ===
The Samsung-PBA Mabuhay Cup was the one-round robin between the five lower seeded teams based on their won-loss records in the elimination round of the All-Filipino Cup to determine the sixth and last qualifying team for the PBA second conference Invitationals.

The Alaska Aces made it as the sixth entry by defeating Barangay Ginebra Kings on July 20 at the Cuneta Astrodome for a perfect 4-0 slate.

Pos	Team	W	L	PCT	GB	Qualification
1	Alaska Aces	4	0	1.000	—	Qualify to Invitational tournament
2	Barangay Ginebra Kings	2	2	.500	2	
3	Sta. Lucia Realtors	2	2	.500	2	
4	Shell Turbo Chargers	2	2	.500	2	
5	Purefoods TJ Hotdogs	0	4	.000	4	

Source: PBA.ph

== Elimination round ==
=== Group A ===
Red Bull gained the last slot in the crossover semis on August 13 at the Cuneta Astrodome in a bizarre ending, Talk 'N Text, which won 88-87, needed to win 8 points, went to the extent of shooting to the Red Bull's goal while enjoying the lead in the closing seconds to possibly force an overtime.

Pos	Team	W	L	PCT	GB	Qualification
1	FedEx Express	3	1	.750 (Note: Head-to-head quotient: FedEx 1.032, Red Bull 1.025, Talk 'N Text 0.949)	—	Semifinals
2	Red Bull Barako	3	1	.750	—	Semifinals
3	Talk 'N Text Phone Pals	3	1	.750	—	
4	KK Novi Sad (Yugoslavia) (G)	1	3	.250	2	
5	Yonsei University (South Korea) (G)	0	4	.000	3	

Source: PBA.ph
(G) Guests
Notes:

NBN/IBC

July 27

recap

Red Bull Barako 106, Yonsei University 96

Cuneta Astrodome, Pasay

NBN/IBC

July 30

recap

FedEx Express 98, KK Novi Sad 81

Cuneta Astrodome, Pasay

NBN/IBC

August 1

Talk 'N Text Phone Pals 121, Yonsei University 112

Cuneta Astrodome, Pasay

NBN/IBC

August 2

Red Bull Barako 75, FedEx Express 70

Cuneta Astrodome, Pasay

NBN/IBC

August 3

Talk 'N Text Phone Pals 110, KK Novi Sad 89

Cuneta Astrodome, Pasay

NBN/IBC

August 6

recap

FedEx Express 93, Yonsei University 90

Cuneta Astrodome, Pasay

NBN/IBC

August 8

Red Bull Barako 103, KK Novi Sad 93

Cuneta Astrodome, Pasay

NBN/IBC

August 9

recap

FedEx Express 91, Talk 'N Text Phone Pals 81

Cuneta Astrodome, Pasay

NBN/IBC

August 10

KK Novi Sad 100, Yonsei University 88

Cuneta Astrodome, Pasay

NBN/IBC

August 13

Talk 'N Text Phone Pals 88, Red Bull Barako 87

Cuneta Astrodome, Pasay

=== Group B ===
Pos	Team	W	L	PCT	GB	Qualification
1	Alaska Aces	4	0	1.000	—	Semifinals
2	Coca-Cola Tigers	3	1	.750	1	Semifinals
3	San Miguel Beermen	2	2	.500	2	
4	Cebuana Lhuillier (Philippine national team) (G)	1	3	.250	3	
5	Magnolia-Jilin (China) (G)	0	4	.000	4	

Source: PBA.ph
(G) Guests

NBN/IBC

July 27

San Miguel Beermen 95, Cebuana Lhuillier 55

Cuneta Astrodome, Pasay

NBN/IBC

July 30

Alaska Aces 97, Magnolia-Jilin 82

Cuneta Astrodome, Pasay

NBN/IBC

August 1

recap

Coca Cola Tigers 98, San Miguel Beermen 93

Cuneta Astrodome, Pasay

NBN/IBC

August 2

recap

Cebuana Lhuillier 114, Magnolia-Jilin 91

Cuneta Astrodome, Pasay

NBN/IBC

August 3

recap

Alaska Aces 81, Coca Cola Tigers 78

Cuneta Astrodome, Pasay

NBN/IBC

August 6

San Miguel Beermen 114, Magnolia-Jilin 98

Cuneta Astrodome, Pasay

NBN/IBC

August 8

recap

Alaska Aces 87, Cebuana Lhuillier 82

Cuneta Astrodome, Pasay

NBN/IBC

August 9

Coca Cola Tigers 98, Magnolia-Jilin 63

Cuneta Astrodome, Pasay

NBN/IBC

August 10

recap

Alaska Aces 87, San Miguel Beermen 72

Cuneta Astrodome, Pasay

NBN/IBC

August 13

recap

Coca Cola Tigers 91, Cebuana Lhuillier 83

Cuneta Astrodome, Pasay

== Bracket ==
Semifinals (Single elimination)
A1	FedEx	83
B2	Coca-Cola	91
B1	Alaska	95
A2	Red Bull	87

Finals (Best-of-3)
B2	Coca-Cola	1
B1	Alaska	2
Third-place playoff
A1	FedEx	99
A2	Red Bull	84

== Semifinals ==
NBN/IBC

August 15

recap

Coca Cola Tigers 91, FedEx Express 83

Ynares Center, Antipolo

NBN/IBC

August 15

Alaska Aces 95, Red Bull Barako 87

Ynares Center, Antipolo

== Third place playoff ==
NBN/IBC

August 17

recap

FedEx Express 99, Red Bull Barako 84

Cuneta Astrodome, Pasay

== Finals ==
2003 PBA Invitational championship finals
Team	Coach	Wins
Alaska Aces	Tim Cone	2
Coca-Cola Tigers	Chot Reyes	1
- Dates: August 17–30, 2003
- MVP: Brandon Cablay
- Television: NBN/IBC

PBA Invitational championship finals chronology
- < 1984

PBA finals chronology
- < 2003 All-Filipino 2003 Reinforced >

The 2003 Philippine Basketball Association (PBA) Invitational Conference finals was the best-of-3 basketball championship series of the 2003 PBA Invitational Conference, and the conclusion of the conference's playoffs. Alaska Aces and Coca-Cola Tigers played for the 85th championship contested by the league.

Alaska Aces won their 11th championship.

=== Series scoring summary ===
The following scoring summary is written in a line score format, except that the quarter numbers are replaced by game numbers.

Team	Game 1	Game 2	Game 3	Wins
Alaska	81	76†	91	2
Coca-Cola	94	78	86	1

† denotes the number of overtimes

=== Scores ===
NBN/IBC

August 17

Alaska Aces 81, Coca Cola Tigers 94

Cuneta Astrodome, Pasay

NBN/IBC

August 20

Alaska Aces 78, Coca Cola Tigers 76 (OT)

Cuneta Astrodome, Pasay

NBN/IBC

August 23

Alaska Aces 91, Coca Cola Tigers 86
Alaska wins series, 2–1

PhilSports Arena, Pasig

Brandon Lee Cablay held the Aces together with timely hits then sparked a fiery Alaska windup as the Tigers came back from 16 points down to even lead twice early in the last quarter. Cablay nailed a three-pointer that tied the count for the final time at 70-all and added back-to-back baskets that finally doomed the Tigers, 84-74, with 2:24 left in the game. The 6-foot Cablay was adjudged as the first rookie Finals MVP since Danny Seigle with San Miguel back in 1999.
