= Asi Taulava =

Filipino-Tongan basketball player

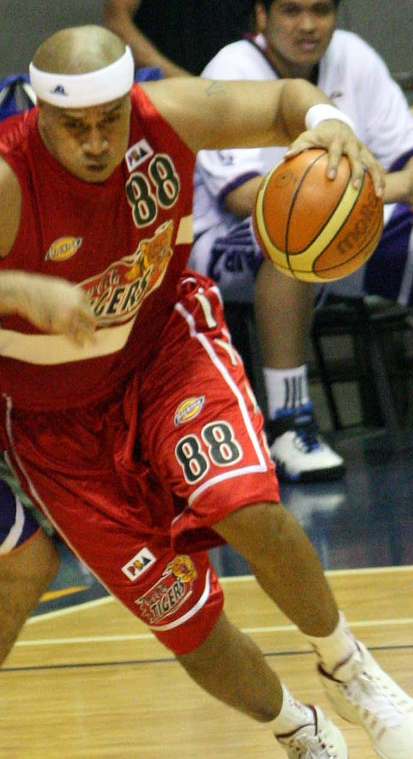
- Asi with the Coca-Cola Tigers in 2010

Personal information
- Born: March 2, 1973 (age 53) Nukuʻalofa, Tonga
- Listed height: 6 ft 9 in (2.06 m)
- Listed weight: 245 lb (111 kg)

Career information
- College: BYU–Hawaii
- PBA draft: 1998: Direct Hire
- Drafted by: Mobiline Phone Pals
- Playing career: 1997–2023
- Position: Center

Career history
- 1997–1999: Blu Detergent Kings
- 1999–2007: Mobiline Phone Pals / Talk 'N Text Phone Pals
- 2007–2010: Coca–Cola Tigers
- 2010–2012: Meralco Bolts
- 2012–2013: San Miguel Beermen (ABL)
- 2013–2014: Air21 Express
- 2014–2023: NLEX Road Warriors

Career highlights
- PBA champion (2003 All-Filipino); PBA Finals MVP (2003 All-Filipino); PBA Most Valuable Player (2003); 17× PBA All-Star (1999, 2001, 2003–2012, 2015–2019); 2× PBA All-Star Game MVP (2004, 2006); 4× PBA Mythical First Team (2003, 2008, 2009, 2014); 4× PBA Mythical Second Team (2002, 2010, 2015, 2016); PBA Best Player of the Conference (2003 All-Filipino); 3× PBA All-Defensive Team (2003, 2008, 2009); PBA Comeback Player of the Year (2014); 2× PBA scoring champion (2002, 2003); 50 Greatest Players in PBA History (2015 selection); ABL Most Valuable Player (2013); No. 88 retired by the NLEX Road Warriors

Pauliasi Taulava (born March 2, 1973) is a Tongan-born Filipino former professional basketball player in the Philippine Basketball Association (PBA).

Standing 6 ft 9 in (2.06 m) tall and weighing 245 pounds (111 kg), Taulava is considered by many to be one of the greatest and most dominant Filipino basketball players to ever play the center position in the PBA. Throughout his 24-year career in the league, Taulava has used his size and strength to overpower opponents for points and rebounds. He is also a many-time member of the Philippine national team in international competitions.

Following his career in the PBL, Taulava entered the PBA in 1999, when he was directly hired by the Mobiline Phone Pals. With his performance, he quickly emerged as one of the top centers in the league, even winning the 2003 MVP award. After eight years with Talk N' Text, he was traded to the Coca-Cola Tigers where he played until 2010. He was later traded to the Meralco Bolts, leading the team for two seasons with his presence and style. In 2012, Taulava decided to leave the PBA to play for the San Miguel Beermen in the ABL. After a brief stint in the league, he returned to the PBA in 2013, where he signed for the Air21 Express.

Taulava's individual accolades include the 2003 MVP award, two All-Star Game MVP awards and the 2013 ABL MVP award.

However, Taulava is also one of the most controversial figures in Philippine basketball due to his numerous issues about his citizenship since he arrived in the local basketball scene in 1997.

He is also known for his dyed hair, although he has also shaved his head bald numerous times in the past. His moniker is "The Rock".

Taulava is also a brand ambassador of the sports clothing brand Under Armour Philippines.

== Philippine Basketball League ==
In 1997 Taulava, a 6 foot 9 inch center from Tonga, along with several Filipino-foreign cagers bannered Blu Detergent in the PBL, where he showed some promise. In 1998, Blu management included Taulava to their roster in the PBL Centennial Cup.

Asi emerged as one of the top players in the league, alongside Tanduay rival Eric Menk. The two had a rivalry of sorts when both players matched-up in two games between Blu and Tanduay.

Taulava led the Detergent Kings and Tia Marias to the semi-finals but failed to lead his team in the finals due to severe bleeding and insomnia.

== PBA career ==
=== Talk 'N Text Phone Pals (1999–2007) ===
He was directly hired by the Mobiline Phone Pals to boost up their frontline. From 1999 to 2002, he was only able to lead the team to a single finals stint which happened during the 2002 Commissioner's Cup, ending as runners-up.

2003 was a fruitful year for Taulava when he led the Phone Pals to the All-Filipino Championship while being named as the Best Player of the Conference. At season's end, he became the first Fil-foreign cager since Great Taste's Ricardo Brown in 1985 to win the Most Valuable Player Award.

In 2004, they ended in third place. Taulava, along with teammate Jimmy Alapag, was named as the co-MVP of the All-Star Game held in Cebu City.

During the 2004–05 PBA season, the Department of Justice announced that Taulava and five other Fil-foreign cagers have irregular documents. PBA commissioner Noli Eala indefinitely suspended him and some of the other players. But even without Taulava, the Phone Pals were still able to have a good elimination round record of 12–6. Later, a series of controversies rocked during the course of the Philippine Cup finals as the Phone Pals lost in five games. In the Fiesta Conference, he led them again to the finals but still lost to the San Miguel Beermen in game five.

During the 2005 off-season, Taulava played for Team Pilipinas in the William Jones Cup and the Brunei Cup tournaments.

During the 2005-06 PBA season, Taulava was named MVP of the All-Star Game held in Cagayan de Oro in 2006 as he led the South All-Stars to a 122–120 win over the North All-Stars.

In 2006–2007, the Phone Pals reached the semi-finals during the Philippine Cup but lost to the Barangay Ginebra Kings in six games. On the following conference, the team reached the finals despite his absence. However, they were still not able to get the crown against the Alaska Aces.

=== Coca-Cola Tigers (2007–2010) ===
On December 5, 2007, In the middle of 2007–2008 Philippine Cup, he was traded to the Coca-Cola Tigers in exchange for Ali Peek and the Tigers 2008 first round pick, who turned out to be Jared Dillinger. Asi's numbers and style of play was then rejuvenated with the new team, lifting the Tigers from wildcard to quarterfinals, but eventually losing to Alaska, 2–0.

In the 2007–2008 season, Taulava averaged 13.5 points, 1.9 assists, 12.5 rebounds, 0.4 steals and 0.6 blocks per game.

On March 29, 2008, in an out-of-town game in Panabo City, Davao del Norte, Taulava tossed in seven points, including a short stab with 11:11 left in the third quarter which made him the 58th member of the PBA's 5,000-point club.

Taulava made his 12th PBA All-Star appearance in the 2010 PBA All-Star Weekend, as he played in the All-Star Game at the Puerto Princesa Coliseum in Palawan. The 2003 MVP awardee was part of the South team’s First 5 alongside Kelly Williams, Eric Menk, Cyrus Baguio, and James Yap. They eventually lost the game against the North All-Stars, 133–130.

=== Meralco Bolts (2010–2012) ===
On September 22, 2010, he was traded to the expansion team Meralco Bolts in exchange for Jason Misolas and Khasim Mirza as part of a three-team deal with the Barako Bull Energy Boosters. When asked upon the center's arrival to the new team, coach Ryan Gregorio said: "Asi (Taulava) is a great welcome addition for us. We definitely need size since it is only Marlou (Aquino) who’s our legitimate center." He also added: "His addition certainly deepens our rotation up front. I am very happy that we got him (Taulava). With him on the team, it improves our team in a flash. Like I said before, if we can fast-track things, we will. This is a big development for us." However, after the departure of Marlou Aquino to the Barako Bull Energy Boosters, Taulava became Meralco's only center.

Taulava made his 2010–11 season debut for the Bolts on October 3, 2010, against the Barangay Ginebra Kings, wearing the number 55 instead of his more common number 88. The Filipino-Tongan player recorded 7 points and 8 rebounds in his first game with Meralco. His first double-double came twelve days after, as he scored 15 points and grabbed 14 rebounds in an 84–92 loss against his former team Talk N' Text.

Meralco opened the 2011 PBA Commissioner's Cup with a game against the Barangay Ginebra Kings on February 18, 2011. In his first game of the year, Taulava recorded a season high with 23 points and 10 rebounds but the Bolts eventually lost to Ginebra, 115–98.

He chose to wear the number 5 because it is also the number he wore in his recent stints at international competitions.

In the 2010–11 season, Taulava was not conceded full playing time and averaged career lows in almost every major statistical category, but still proved to be one of the focal points of Meralco's offense. He improved his numbers in the following season.

After leading the Bolts for two seasons, he decided to leave the organization and declined a two-year contract extension worth maximum salary. Taulava went to play for the San Miguel Beermen instead in the ABL. In 2013, he won the ABL Most Valuable Player award.

=== Air21 Express / NLEX Road Warriors (2013–2023) ===
Following a brief stint in the ABL, Taulava signed for the Air21 Express to play the 2013 PBA Governors' Cup, making him the oldest active PBA player at 40 years old. He made his debut on September 13, 2013, against his former team Talk N' Text, where he scored 7 points and led his team to a 106–102 victory.

Due to Air21 being unable to reach the playoffs of the 2013 Governor's Cup, Taulava finished the 2012–13 season with only 3 games.

In his second season with Air21, Taulava saw more action in the league. Express was eliminated in the first round of the 2013–14 Philippine Cup with a dismal 3–11 record. Taulava led Air21 to the quarterfinals of the 2014 Commissioner's Cup where they met the San Miguel Beermen. In a surprising upset, Air21 made their first semifinals appearance in franchise history, after beating the second-seeded Beermen with the knockout game ending in two overtimes. However, they were beaten by the eventual champions San Mig Super Coffee Mixers in their semifinals series that extended to Game 5. The 2003 MVP also led his team to the quarterfinals of the 2014 Governors' Cup, where they were ousted by Rain or Shine. The 41-year-old Taulava was averaging his most minutes (37.7) in five years and took on a much more significant role than in previous years. As a result, his numbers and style of play also were revived by his time in Air21 where he averaged 14.7 points, 12.3 rebounds, and 2.0 assists. His strong performance during the season also made him one of the candidates for the MVP award, which was ultimately won by June Mar Fajardo. At the season's end, Taulava was given the Comeback Player of the Year award.

Bothered by financial problems, the Air21 Express was acquired by expansion team NLEX Road Warriors before the start of the 2014–15 season. In August 2014, the 2003 MVP was also signed a two-year, maximum salary deal worth P10 million.

On October 14, 2016, Taulava was recognized during the PBA Leo Awards Night as he was named to the PBA Mythical Second Team.

After the 2022–23 season, Taulava retired from professional basketball. On December 8, 2023, NLEX announced that the team will retire Taulava's jersey number 88 in a game scheduled on December 13 against the TNT Tropang Giga, where Taulava formerly played. On December 12, he was activated by the team, making him eligible to play for one final game. On December 13, he started the game against TNT and played for almost two minutes before being subbed out for the rest of the game. In the process, he played his 24th season in the PBA, breaking the previous record he shared with Robert Jaworski. Taulava also became the second player in the PBA at the age of 50 after Jaworski. During halftime of the same game, his jersey number was officially retired.

== PBA career statistics ==
Legend
| GP | Games played | MPG | Minutes per game |
| FG% | Field-goal percentage | 3P% | 3-point field-goal percentage | FT% | Free-throw percentage |
| RPG | Rebounds per game | APG | Assists per game | SPG | Steals per game |
| BPG | Blocks per game | PPG | Points per game | **Bold** | Career high |

=== Season-by-season averages ===
| Year | Team | GP | MPG | FG% | 3P% | FT% | RPG | APG | SPG | BPG | PPG |
|---|---|---|---|---|---|---|---|---|---|---|---|
| 1999 | Mobiline | 37 | **43.1** | .459 | .000 | .604 | 12.0 | 3.3 | .5 | .8 | 17.7 |
| 2000 | Mobiline | 12 | 40.6 | .524 | — | .569 | **13.8** | 3.5 | **1.0** | .4 | 21.5 |
| 2001 | Mobiline / Talk 'N Text | 22 | 39.1 | .452 | .200 | .631 | 12.8 | 1.5 | .5 | **1.3** | 19.9 |
| 2002 | Talk 'N Text | 10 | 37.3 | .430 | .000 | .747 | 11.3 | **5.4** | .8 | 1.2 | 21.3 |
| 2003 | Talk 'N Text | **54** | 42.2 | .493 | .254 | .544 | 13.7 | 3.6 | .4 | **1.3** | **23.4** |
| 2004–05 | Talk 'N Text | 34 | 37.5 | .554 | .378 | .667 | 11.1 | 2.0 | .7 | .8 | 20.2 |
| 2005–06 | Talk 'N Text | 41 | 35.1 | .491 | .125 | .455 | 13.0 | 1.6 | .5 | 1.1 | 14.9 |
| 2006–07 | Talk 'N Text | 29 | 31.3 | .534 | .000 | .617 | 10.9 | 2.1 | .1 | .8 | 16.6 |
| 2007–08 | Talk 'N Text | 45 | 32.0 | .448 | .250 | .490 | 12.5 | 1.9 | .4 | .5 | 13.5 |
| 2007–08 | Coca-Cola | 45 | 32.0 | .448 | .250 | .490 | 12.5 | 1.9 | .4 | .5 | 13.5 |
| 2008–09 | Coca-Cola | 32 | 36.7 | .439 | .308 | .552 | 12.8 | 3.0 | .4 | .5 | 16.9 |
| 2009–10 | Coca-Cola | 31 | 32.1 | .369 | .000 | .591 | 11.5 | 3.1 | .2 | .3 | 11.2 |
| 2010–11 | Meralco | 31 | 23.0 | .481 | — | .495 | 7.9 | .7 | .2 | .5 | 7.5 |
| 2011–12 | Meralco | 44 | 26.3 | .535 | — | .586 | 8.7 | .6 | .4 | .7 | 8.2 |
| 2012–13 | Air21 | 3 | 36.0 | .524 | — | .286 | 12.7 | 3.7 | .0 | **1.3** | 9.3 |
| 2013–14 | Air21 | 40 | 37.7 | .469 | .000 | .595 | 12.4 | 2.0 | .5 | .6 | 14.8 |
| 2014–15 | NLEX | 36 | 32.2 | .490 | .000 | .658 | 9.9 | 1.9 | .3 | .3 | 13.9 |
| 2015–16 | NLEX | 35 | 31.8 | .473 | .000 | .624 | 10.1 | 2.1 | .5 | .3 | 13.9 |
| 2016–17 | NLEX | 31 | 10.3 | .441 | .250 | .667 | 3.0 | .7 | .2 | .2 | 3.5 |
| 2017–18 | NLEX | 32 | 7.8 | .405 | .304 | .500 | 2.5 | .6 | .2 | .3 | 2.7 |
| 2019 | NLEX | 20 | 8.3 | .286 | .207 | **.833** | 3.1 | .5 | .3 | .3 | 2.0 |
| 2020 | NLEX | 3 | 8.7 | .556 | .400 | .333 | 2.0 | .7 | .0 | 1.0 | 4.3 |
| 2021 | NLEX | 1 | 2.2 | **1.000** | **1.000** | — | 2.0 | .0 | .0 | .0 | 3.0 |
| 2022–23 | NLEX | 1 | 5.1 | .000 | .000 | — | .0 | .0 | .0 | .0 | .0 |
| 2023–24 | NLEX | 1 | 1.9 | — | — | — | 1.0 | .0 | .0 | .0 | .0 |
| Career | | 625 | 31.0 | .475 | .246 | .576 | 10.3 | 2.0 | .4 | .7 | 13.7 |

== National team career ==
In 2002, Taulava played for Team Philippines in the 2002 Asian Games in Busan, Korea. Taulava showed promise during the said tournament in as Center but had a hard time guarding Chinese center, Yao Ming. In the end, the Philippines went home without a medal after suffering a harsh defeat in the semifinals against host Korea and even losing the bronze medal against Kazakhstan.

In 2005, Taulava was added in the Team Pilipinas Training Pool of Chot Reyes. He was part of the country's third-place finish in the William Jones Cup tournament behind Passing Lane Sports of the United States and host, Chinese Taipei. Taulava also led Team Pilipinas to the championship of the 5th Brunei Sultan Cup.

In 2006, Taulava participated in the team's 110–102 victory over the Dennis Rodman-led American team on May 1.

In 2007, Taulava was once again a national team member in 2007 FIBA Asia Championship in Japan. Despite Taulava's tremendous performance as Center, the team failed to pass the preliminary round, which was considered the "group of death", winning only one game against China and losing to eventual champion Iran and Jordan.

In 2008, he was again listed under the RP Training Pool under Coach Yeng Guiao.

In 2010, he played for the Smart Gilas during the Stankovic Cup Asia Tournament helping the team to a 4th-place finish.

Along with Kelly Williams, Taulava was granted the permission to play for Smart Gilas for the 2010 Asian Games in November. The team eventually reached 6th place in the tournament. In January 2011, Taulava declared his availability for Smart Gilas to represent the country at the 2011 FIBA Asia Championship, held in Wuhan, China. The 2003 MVP also said: "I’ll make all the necessary sacrifice for Team Pilipinas and our country. Let’s all unite for flag and country and make 2011 a year for Philippine basketball." In August 2011, Taulava joined the Smart Gilas Team for the 2011 William Jones Cup; in the preliminary round of the tournament, the Philippine team compiled a promising 5–2 record, before being eliminated in the semifinals by Iran. On August 9, 2011, during a game against Malaysia, Taulava got involved in an altercation with Yoong Jing Kwaan. The episode happened in the third quarter of the match; with less than 20 seconds remaining in the period, Taulava suddenly went down on the floor in pain after Yoong Jing Kwaan grabbed and squeezed his private parts. The Fil-Tongan then stood up, chased the Malaysian player and hit him twice in the head. The two were later tossed out with 7.4 seconds left in the period. Smart Gilas eventually won, 86–68. Taulava would later apologize for his actions.

In 2011, Taulava retired from international competitions after the stint at the 2011 FIBA Asia Championship. Taulava has been a member of the Philippines men's national basketball team since 2002.

In 2015, he returned to international competitions. He played for the national team at the 2015 FIBA Asia Championship where the Philippines took home the silver.

In 2018, he was part of the 12-man line-up of the Philippines men's basketball team for the 2018 Asian Games at Jakarta and Palembang, Indonesia. He played with Fil-Am NBA star Jordan Clarkson and finish fifth overall.

== Awards and accomplishments ==
=== PBA ===
- PBA Champion (2003 All-Filipino)
- PBA Finals MVP (2003 All-Filipino)
- 2003 PBA Most Valuable Player
- 2004 PBA All-Stars Game Most Valuable Player (shared with Jimmy Alapag)
- 2009 Defensive Player of the Year
- All-Filipino Best Player of the Conference (2003)
- Reinforced Finals MVP (2003)
- All-Star MVP (2006–2007)
- Member, PBA 5,000 point club
- 2009 PBA PBA All-Defensive Team
- 2003 PBA PBA All-Defensive Team
- 2003 Mythical First Team
- 2008 Mythical First Team
- 2009 Mythical First Team
- 2002 Mythical Second Team

=== International ===
- 2002 Philippines-Chinese Taipei Basketball Series
- 2002 Philippines-Qatar Basketball Series
- 2002 Philippines-Melbourne Tigers Basketball Series
- 2002 Four Nations Invitational Tournament (Italy), 3rd place
- 2002 Asian Games, 4th place
- 2005 William Jones Cup, 3rd place (Bronze)
- 2005 Brunei Cup champions
- 2006 Philippines-Lebanon Basketball Series
- 2006 Brunei Cup champions
- 2007 FIBA Asia Champions Cup
- 2007 SEABA champions
- 2007 William Jones Cup, 3rd place (Bronze)
- 2007 Four Nations Invitational Tournament (Philippines) champions
- 2007 Philippines-Kuwait Basketball Series
- 2007 FIBA Asia Championship, 9th place
- 2009 Philippines-Australian Great White Sharks Basketball Series
- 2009 Philippines-PBA All-Star Exhibition Series
- 2009 SEABA champions
- 2011 Smart Ultimate All-Star Challenge (Smart Gilas)
- 2011 William Jones Cup, 3rd place (Bronze)
- 2013 ASEAN Basketball League MVP
- 2015 William Jones Cup, 2nd place (Silver)
- 2015 FIBA Asia Championship, 2nd place (Silver)
- 2018 Asian Games, 5th place

== Controversy ==
Taulava's citizenship has been questioned ever since he arrived in the PBL in 1998. A government scrutiny from 1999 to 2000 about the alleged number of fake Fil-foreign cagers led to his deportation in April 2000. Taulava proved his citizenship when he returned to the country in 2001. Three years later, his name became a subject of DOJ's scrutiny on the said issue that led to his indefinite suspension in the PBA.

It is claimed that Taulava's mother, Pauline Hernandez Mateeaki, was born in the Samar Province. However, the documents are said to be inaccurate. Some reports even claim Hernandez was born in Tonga. While Taulava is now cleared by the Justice Department, it remains to be seen if his citizenship will be questioned again in the near future.
