= 2003 PBA All-Filipino Cup finals =

Basketball cup finals

Team	Coach	Wins
Talk 'N Text Phone Pals	Joel Banal	4
Coca Cola Tigers	Chot Reyes	2
- Dates: July 2–13, 2003
- MVP: Asi Taulava
- Television: NBN/IBC
- Radio network: Radyo PBA

PBA All-Filipino Cup finals chronology
- < 2002 2004–05 >

PBA finals chronology
- < 2002 All-Filipino 2003 Invitational >

The 2003 Samsung-PBA All-Filipino Cup finals was the best-of-7 basketball championship series of the 2003 PBA All-Filipino Cup and the conclusion of the conference's playoffs. The Talk 'N Text Phone Pals and Coca Cola Tigers played for the 84th championship contested by the league.

Talk 'N Text Phone Pals overcame a 0–2 overhaul and wins their first-ever PBA title in 13 years, (not counting the 1998 PBA Centennial Cup) winning four straight over the defending champions Coca Cola Tigers in a 4–2 series victory.

== Series scoring summary ==
Team	Game 1	Game 2	Game 3	Game 4	Game 5	Game 6	Wins
Talk 'N Text	79	89	67	99	97	78	4
Coca Cola	93	92	59	91	92	76	2

== Games summary ==
=== Game 1 ===
NBN/IBC

July 2

recap

Talk 'N Text Phone Pals 79, Coca Cola Tigers 93
Coca Cola leads series, 1–0

Cuneta Astrodome, Pasay

Down by 17 at 46–63, the Phone Pals came back to trailed within five at 64–69 as Asi Taulava and Felix Belano starred in a key run stretch, but Coca Cola stopped the Talk 'N Text rally with Jeffrey Cariaso hitting 13 of his 19 points in the fourth quarter.

=== Game 2 ===
NBN/IBC

July 4

recap

Talk 'N Text Phone Pals 89, Coca Cola Tigers 92
Pts: Asi Taulava 40
Coca Cola leads series, 2–0

Araneta Coliseum, Quezon City

=== Game 3 ===
NBN/IBC

July 6

recap

Talk 'N Text Phone Pals 67, Coca Cola Tigers 59
Scoring by quarter: 17–13, 19–20, 15–8, 16–18
Pts: Asi Taulava 20	Pts: Rafi Reavis 16
Coca Cola leads series, 2–1

Araneta Coliseum, Quezon City

Bong Ravena drained a short jumper and converted two pressure-packed free throws that neutralized a comeback by the Tigers. Both teams fared poorly from the perimeter.

=== Game 4 ===
NBN/IBC

July 9

recap

Talk 'N Text Phone Pals 99, Coca Cola Tigers 91
Pts: Jimmy Alapag 27
Series tied, 2–2

Araneta Coliseum, Quezon City

=== Game 5 ===
NBN/IBC

July 11

Talk 'N Text Phone Pals 97, Coca Cola Tigers 92 (OT)
Scoring by quarter: 23–15, 17–26, 21–20, 20–20, Overtime: 16–11
Pts: Asi Taulava 26	Pts: Rudy Hatfield 23
Talk 'N Text leads series, 3–2

Araneta Coliseum, Quezon City

Talk 'N Text came back from a 9-point deficit midway in the final quarter, a triple by Bong Ravena tied the game at 79-all, Asi Taulava shoved the Phone Pals ahead with two free throws, 81–79, with 32 seconds to go, Ato Morano's twisting layup with 20 seconds left tied the count at 81-all, the game went into overtime after Morano's potential game-winner rimmed out at the buzzer. In the extension period, the Tigers took an 87–81 advantage on Johnny Abarrientos' back-to-back jumpers and assist, a 13–2 run by the Phone Pals bucked a sizzling Coca Cola start in overtime, clutch hits by Victor Pablo and Patrick Fran gave Talk 'N Text a 94–89 lead.

=== Game 6 ===
NBN/IBC

July 13

Talk 'N Text Phone Pals 78, Coca Cola Tigers 76
Scoring by quarter: 12–23, 18–21, 22–14, 26–18
Pts: Asi Taulava 25	Pts: Johnny Abarrientos 20
Talk 'N Text wins series, 4–2

Cuneta Astrodome, Pasay

The Tigers led by as many as 14 points before the Phone Pals tied the game for the first time at 58-all early in the last quarter, Coca Cola led for the last time at 71–68 when a three-pointer by Bong Ravena tied the count, Asi Taulava broke the deadlock with a short jumper and then Jimmy Alapag unloaded another triple after a free throw by Ato Morano as Talk 'N Text opened up a 76–72 lead in the last 43 seconds, two free throws by Johnny Abarrientos followed by two charity misses by Taulava and another free throw by Rudy Hatfield pulled the Tigers within one, 75–76, with 29 seconds to go, Taulava finally made his second free throw with 13 seconds left and Ravena contributed another to seal the win, 78–75, after Morano missed a hurried three-point attempt.

2003 PBA All-Filipino Cup Champions

Talk 'N Text Phone Pals
1st title

== Rosters ==
Talk 'N Text Phone Pals roster
Players

Pos.	#	POB	Name	Height	Weight	DOB (YYYY–MM–DD)	From
F	00	(United States)	William Villa	6 ft 2 in (1.88 m)			BYU–Hawaii
G	1	(Philippines)	Bong Ravena	6 ft 1 in (1.85 m)			UE
G	3	(United States)	Jimmy Alapag	5 ft 9 in (1.75 m)			Cal State San Bernardino
F	4	(United States)	Harvey Carey	6 ft 3 in (1.91 m)			Sonoma State
G	8	(Philippines)	Patrick Fran	6 ft 0 in (1.83 m)			UST
F	13	(Philippines)	Mark Telan	6 ft 6 in (1.98 m)			De La Salle
F	15	(Philippines)	Expedito Falcasantos	6 ft 4 in (1.93 m)			Cebu
F	19	(Philippines)	Norman Gonzales	6 ft 4 in (1.93 m)			San Beda
G/F	28	(Philippines)	Jojo Manalo	6 ft 2 in (1.88 m)			UPHSD
F	33	(Philippines)	Victor Pablo	6 ft 4 in (1.93 m)			Far Eastern
C	38	(Philippines)	Angelo David	6 ft 6 in (1.98 m)			Far Eastern
G	42	(Philippines)	Donbel Belano	5 ft 8 in (1.73 m)			Visayas
C	88	(Tonga)	Asi Taulava	6 ft 9 in (2.06 m)			BYU–Hawaii

Coaches

Head coach

- (Philippines) Joel Banal

Assistant coach(es)

- (Philippines) Ariel Vanguardia
- (Philippines) Virgil Villavicencio
- (Philippines) Aric del Rosario

Legend

- (C) Team captain
- Injured

Coca-Cola Tigers roster
Players

Pos.	#	POB	Name	Height	Weight	DOB (YYYY–MM–DD)	From
F	4	(United States)	Rafi Reavis	6 ft 6 in (1.98 m)			Coppin State
G	5	(United States)	Rob Wainwright	6 ft 5 in (1.96 m)			Solano CC
G	10	(Philippines)	Ato Morano	6 ft 0 in (1.83 m)			San Beda
G	14	(Philippines)	Johnny Abarrientos	5 ft 8 in (1.73 m)			Far Eastern
F	16	(Philippines)	Bong Hawkins	6 ft 4 in (1.93 m)			UPHSD
G	18	(Philippines)	Leo Avenido	6 ft 2 in (1.88 m)			Far Eastern
F	21	(Philippines)	Reynel Hugnatan	6 ft 3 in (1.91 m)			Manila
G	22	(United States)	Jeffrey Cariaso	6 ft 2 in (1.88 m)			Sonoma State
C	24	(Philippines)	Cris Bolado	6 ft 7 in (2.01 m)			National-U
F	25	(Philippines)	Freddie Abuda	6 ft 4 in (1.93 m)			Cebu
G	31	(United States)	William Antonio	6 ft 3 in (1.91 m)			Chaminade
C	32	(Philippines)	Poch Juinio	6 ft 5 in (1.96 m)			Philippines
F	99	(United States)	Rudy Hatfield	6 ft 3 in (1.91 m)			UM–Dearborn

Coaches

Head coach

- (Philippines) Chot Reyes

Assistant coach(es)

- (Philippines) Nash Racela
- (Philippines) Biboy Ravanes
- (Philippines) Binky Favis
- (Philippines) Aboy Castro
- (Philippines) Mike Reyes

Legend

- (C) Team captain
- Injured

== Broadcast notes ==
Game	Play-by-play	Analyst	Courtside Reporters
Game 1			
Game 2			
Game 3			
Game 4			
Game 5			
Game 6	Sev Sarmenta	Quinito Henson	TJ Manotoc and Paolo Trillo
