= 2003 PBA All-Filipino Cup =

- Duration: February 23 – July 13, 2003
- TV partner(s): NBN/IBC

Finals
- Champions: Talk 'N Text Phone Pals
- Runners-up: Coca Cola Tigers

Awards
- Best Player: Asi Taulava (Talk 'N Text Phone Pals)
- Finals MVP: Asi Taulava (Talk 'N Text Phone Pals)

PBA All-Filipino Cup chronology
- < 2002 2004–05 >

PBA conference chronology
- < 2002 All-Filipino 2003 Invitational >

The 2003 Philippine Basketball Association (PBA) All-Filipino Cup, or known as the 2003 Samsung-PBA All-Filipino Cup for sponsorship reasons, was the first conference of the 2003 PBA season. It started on February 23 and ended on July 13, 2003. The tournament is an All-Filipino format, which doesn't require an import or a pure-foreign player for each team.

== Format ==
The following format will be observed for the duration of the conference:

- The teams were divided into 2 groups.

Group A:

1. Alaska Aces
2. FedEx Express
3. Purefoods TJ Hotdogs
4. San Miguel Beermen
5. Sta. Lucia Realtors

Group B:

1. Barangay Ginebra Kings
2. Coca-Cola Tigers
3. Red Bull Thunder
4. Shell Turbo Chargers
5. Talk 'N Text Phone Pals

- Teams were divided into two groups but will play a two-round eliminations; 18 games per team; Teams are then seeded by basis on win–loss records. Ties are broken among point differentials of the tied teams.
- The top four teams per group will qualify to the quarterfinals
- Quarterfinals will be a single round robin affair within the groups. Results from the elimination will not be carried over.
- The top two teams per group will qualify to the semifinal round.
- Best-of-five semifinals:
  - SF1: A1 vs. B2
  - SF2: B1 vs. A2
- Third-place playoff: losers of the semifinals
- Best-of-seven finals: winners of the semifinals

== Elimination round ==
=== Group A ===
Pos	Team	W	L	PCT	GB	Qualification
1	San Miguel Beermen	12	6	.667	—	Quarterfinal round
2	FedEx Express	10	8	.556	2	Quarterfinal round
3	Alaska Aces	9	9	.500	3	Quarterfinal round
4	Sta. Lucia Realtors	8	10	.444	4	Quarterfinal round
5	Purefoods TJ Hotdogs	5	13	.278	7	

Source: PBA.ph

=== Group B ===
Pos	Team	W	L	PCT	GB	Qualification
1	Batang Red Bull Thunder	14	4	.778	—	Quarterfinal round
2	Coca-Cola Tigers	11	7	.611	3	Quarterfinal round
3	Talk 'N Text Phone Pals	10	8	.556	4	Quarterfinal round
4	Barangay Ginebra Kings	6	12	.333	8	Quarterfinal round
5	Shell Turbo Chargers	5	13	.278	9	

Source: PBA.ph

Batang Red Bull won 10 of their first 11 games of the season. The Thunder were on a nine-game winning streak before suffering back-to-back losses to Talk 'N Text and FedEx.

== Quarterfinal round ==
=== Group A ===
Pos	Team	W	L	PCT	GB	Qualification
1	Alaska Aces	2	1	.667 (Note: Head-to-head record: Alaska 1–1 Sta. Lucia (Alaska +5))	—	Semifinals
2	Sta. Lucia Realtors	2	1	.667	—	Semifinals
3	San Miguel Beermen	1	2	.333 (Note: Head-to-head record: FedEx 1–1 San Miguel (San Miguel +1))	1	
4	FedEx Express	1	2	.333	1	

Source: PBA.ph
Notes:

Alaska beat Sta.Lucia, 75-66, and the Aces got a free ride to the semifinals from the San Miguel Beermen, which beat FedEx, 96-87. The Express were hoping to create a possible three-way tie.

=== Group B ===
Pos	Team	W	L	PCT	GB	Qualification
1	Coca-Cola Tigers	3	0	1.000	—	Semifinals
2	Talk 'N Text Phone Pals	2	1	.667	1	Semifinals
3	Batang Red Bull Thunder	1	2	.333	2	
4	Barangay Ginebra Kings	0	3	.000	3	

Source: PBA.ph

Talk 'N Text and Coca Cola advances to the semifinals, the Phone Pals defeated Barangay Ginebra, 99-86, while the Tigers nip Batang Red Bull, the team with the best record in the eliminations, 80-79.

== Bracket ==
Semifinals (Best-of-5)
A1	Alaska	2
B2	Talk 'N Text	3
B1	Coca-Cola	3
A2	Sta. Lucia	1

Finals (Best-of-7)
B2	Talk 'N Text	4
B1	Coca-Cola	2
Third-place playoff
A1	Alaska	102
A2	Sta. Lucia	79

== Semifinals ==
=== (A1) Alaska vs. (B2) Talk 'N Text ===
NBN/IBC

June 20

recap

Alaska Aces 109, Talk 'N Text Phone Pals 115 (OT)

PhilSports Arena, Pasig

NBN/IBC

June 22

recap

Alaska Aces 86, Talk 'N Text Phone Pals 77

Araneta Coliseum, Quezon City

NBN/IBC

June 25

recap

Alaska Aces 74, Talk 'N Text Phone Pals 87

PhilSports Arena, Pasig

NBN/IBC

June 27

recap

Alaska Aces 87, Talk 'N Text Phone Pals 86 (OT)

PhilSports Arena, Pasig

NBN/IBC

June 29

recap

Alaska Aces 88, Talk 'N Text Phone Pals 92
Talk 'N Text wins series, 3–2

Araneta Coliseum, Quezon City

=== (B1) Coca Cola vs. (A2) Sta. Lucia ===
NBN/IBC

June 20

Coca Cola Tigers 85, Sta. Lucia Realtors 70

PhilSports Arena, Pasig

NBN/IBC

June 22

Coca Cola Tigers 87, Sta. Lucia Realtors 90

Araneta Coliseum, Quezon City

NBN/IBC

June 25

Coca Cola Tigers 94, Sta. Lucia Realtors 80

PhilSports Arena, Pasig

NBN/IBC

June 27

Coca Cola Tigers 99, Sta. Lucia Realtors 93
Coca Cola wins series, 3–1

PhilSports Arena, Pasig

== Third place playoff ==
NBN/IBC

July 2

Alaska Aces 102, Sta. Lucia Realtors 79

Cuneta Astrodome, Pasay

== Finals ==
NBN/IBC

July 2

Coca Cola Tigers 93, Talk 'N Text Phone Pals 79

Cuneta Astrodome, Pasay

NBN/IBC

July 4

Coca Cola Tigers 92, Talk 'N Text Phone Pals 89

Araneta Coliseum, Quezon City

NBN/IBC

July 6

Coca Cola Tigers 59, Talk 'N Text Phone Pals 67

Araneta Coliseum, Quezon City

NBN/IBC

July 9

Coca Cola Tigers 91, Talk 'N Text Phone Pals 99

Araneta Coliseum, Quezon City

NBN/IBC

July 11

Coca Cola Tigers 92, Talk 'N Text Phone Pals 97 (OT)

Araneta Coliseum, Quezon City

NBN/IBC

July 13

Coca Cola Tigers 76, Talk 'N Text Phone Pals 78
Talk 'N Text wins series, 4–2

Cuneta Astrodome, Pasay
