= 2003 PBA season =

29th PBA season

- Duration: February 23 – December 14, 2003
- Teams: 10
- TV partner(s): Local: NBN, IBC; International: The Filipino Channel

2003 PBA Draft
- Top draft pick: Mike Cortez
- Picked by: Alaska Aces
- Season MVP: Asi Taulava (Talk 'N Text Phone Pals)
- All-Filipino Cup champions: Talk 'N Text Phone Pals
- All-Filipino Cup runners-up: Coca Cola Tigers
- Invitational Cup champions: Alaska Aces
- Invitational Cup runners-up: Coca Cola Tigers
- Reinforced Conference champions: Coca-Cola Tigers
- Reinforced Conference runners-up: San Miguel Beermen

Seasons
- ← 2002 2004-05 →

The 2003 PBA season was the 29th season of the Philippine Basketball Association (PBA).

== Board of governors ==
=== Executive committee ===
- Jose Emmanuel M. Eala (Commissioner)
- Casiano Cabalan Jr. (Chairman, representing Barangay Ginebra Kings)
- Manuel M. Encarnado (Vice-Chairman, representing Sta. Lucia Realtors)
- Angelito Alvarez (Treasurer, representing FedEx Express)

=== Teams ===
Team	Company	Governor	Alternate Governor
Alaska Aces	Alaska Milk Corporation	Wilfred Steven Uytengsu	Joaquin Trillo
Barangay Ginebra Kings	La Tondeña Distillers, Inc.	Casiano Cabalan Jr	Ira Daniel Maniquis
Batang Red Bull Thunder	Photokina Marketing Corporation	George Chua	Manuel Mendoza
Coca Cola Tigers	Coca-Cola Bottlers Philippines, Inc.	Jesse Macias	
FedEx Express	Airfrieght 2100, Inc.	Angelito Alvarez	Alberto Lina
Purefoods TJ Hotdogs	Purefoods Corporation	Francisco Alejo III	Rene Pardo
Sta. Lucia Realtors	Sta. Lucia Realty and Development Corporation	Manuel Encarnado	Ariel Magno
San Miguel Beermen	San Miguel Brewery, Inc.	Alberto Malapit	Ely Capacio
Shell Turbo Chargers	Pilipinas Shell Petroleum Corporation	Roberto Kanapi	
Talk 'N Text Phone Pals	Philippine Long Distance Telephone Company	Ricky Vargas	Al Panlilio

== Opening ceremonies ==
The muses for the participating teams are as follows:

Team	Muse
Alaska Aces	Michelle Quizon
Batang Red Bull Thunder	Four Binibining Pilipinas-Miss World
Barangay Ginebra Kings	Aubrey Miles
Coca-Cola Tigers	Zorayda Ruth Andam
FedEx Express	Sandra Seifert
Purefoods TJ Hotdogs	Maxene Magalona
San Miguel Beermen	Apreal Tolentino
Shell Turbo Chargers	Phoemela Baranda
Sta. Lucia Realtors	Cindy Kurleto
Talk 'N Text Phone Pals	Mika Lim

== Notable occurrences ==
- The NBN/IBC consortium took over the league's TV coverage after winning the TV rights over the league's TV partner Viva Television in December 2002.
- Noli Eala became the league's sixth commissioner after Jun Bernardino retired at the end of the 2002 season.
- The league reintroduced the Invitational Championship and the Reinforced Conference.
- The league reverted their rules of playing 12-minute quarters and the use of the 6.75 m (22.1 feet) three point line. The eight-second backcourt rule was retained. In 2002, the league adopted all of the FIBA basketball rules to prepare the players that will play for the Asian Games in Busan.
- The Talk 'N Text Phone Pals filed a game protest on their match against the Barangay Ginebra Kings on March 21 and questioned the nullification of a possible game-winning shot of Asi Taulava with 0.2 seconds remaining in the first overtime. Barangay Ginebra eventually won the match, 122–117 in the second overtime. On March 26, PBA commissioner Noli Eala ordered to replay the game on April 22. All game statistics from the nullified game, including the 45-point, 18-rebound explosion of Eric Menk of Barangay Ginebra, and the 40-point, 14-assist output of Jimmy Alapag of Talk 'N Text will be removed from the PBA records. The replay was won by Talk 'N Text, 90–87.
- The league's greatest rivalry; the Crispa Redmanizers and Toyota Tamaraws clash in a reunion game coinciding the league's All-Star Weekend at the Araneta Coliseum. The Toyota Tamaraws won, 65–61.
- The NBN/IBC consortium and the PBA contested the placement of logos of Beam Toothpaste at the Araneta Coliseum's basketball flooring. The advertisement placements were done between the Araneta Coliseum and Nelson Macaraig's Jonels Promotion. A same agreement was done by Jonels Promotion for the PhilSports Arena weeks after. The league considered this as "backdoor advertising" as Macaraig did not enter an agreement with the PBA to put Beam's logos in the league's main playing venues and threatened the management of both venues that they will not hold their games at Araneta Coliseum and PhilSports Arena unless both will remove the Beam Toothpaste advertisements.
- An estafa case was filed against Nelson Macaraig and Jonels Promotion after Macaraig issued a bounced check for P5 million for payment for the Beam Toothpaste advertisements at the Araneta Coliseum and PhilSports Arena.
- Commissioner Noli Eala sanctioned the Talk 'N Text Phone Pals with a P250,000 fine, for shooting at their opponent's basket at the closing seconds of their match against Red Bull Barako on August 13, 2003. Talk 'N Text was leading with one point 88-87 and wanted to force the game to overtime since Talk 'N Text needed to win at least eight points to enter the playoffs. Talk 'N Text coach Ariel Vanguardia was separately fined with P50,000 and suspended for five games.
- A random drug testing was initiated by the league and two players were suspended for testing positive in illegal substance: Alex Crisano of the Barangay Ginebra Kings and Jimwell Torion of Red Bull Barako.

== 2003 PBA All-Filipino Cup ==
=== Elimination round ===
==== Group A ====
Pos	Team	W	L	PCT	GB	Qualification
1	San Miguel Beermen	12	6	.667	—	Quarterfinal round
2	FedEx Express	10	8	.556	2	Quarterfinal round
3	Alaska Aces	9	9	.500	3	Quarterfinal round
4	Sta. Lucia Realtors	8	10	.444	4	Quarterfinal round
5	Purefoods TJ Hotdogs	5	13	.278	7	

Source: PBA.ph

==== Group B ====
Pos	Team	W	L	PCT	GB	Qualification
1	Batang Red Bull Thunder	14	4	.778	—	Quarterfinal round
2	Coca-Cola Tigers	11	7	.611	3	Quarterfinal round
3	Talk 'N Text Phone Pals	10	8	.556	4	Quarterfinal round
4	Barangay Ginebra Kings	6	12	.333	8	Quarterfinal round
5	Shell Turbo Chargers	5	13	.278	9	

Source: PBA.ph

=== Quarterfinal round ===
==== Group A ====
Pos	Team	W	L	PCT	GB	Qualification
1	Alaska Aces	2	1	.667 (Note: Head-to-head record: Alaska 1–1 Sta. Lucia (Alaska +5))	—	Semifinals
2	Sta. Lucia Realtors	2	1	.667	—	Semifinals
3	San Miguel Beermen	1	2	.333 (Note: Head-to-head record: FedEx 1–1 San Miguel (San Miguel +1))	1	
4	FedEx Express	1	2	.333	1	

Source: PBA.ph

==== Group B ====
Pos	Team	W	L	PCT	GB	Qualification
1	Coca-Cola Tigers	3	0	1.000	—	Semifinals
2	Talk 'N Text Phone Pals	2	1	.667	1	Semifinals
3	Batang Red Bull Thunder	1	2	.333	2	
4	Barangay Ginebra Kings	0	3	.000	3	

Source: PBA.ph

=== Playoffs ===
Semifinals (Best-of-5)
A1	Alaska	2
B2	Talk 'N Text	3
B1	Coca-Cola	3
A2	Sta. Lucia	1

Finals (Best-of-7)
B2	Talk 'N Text	4
B1	Coca-Cola	2
Third-place playoff
A1	Alaska	102
A2	Sta. Lucia	79

==== Semifinals ====
Team 1	Series	Team 2	Game 1	Game 2	Game 3	Game 4	Game 5
(A1) Alaska Aces	3–1	(B2) Talk 'N Text Phone Pals	109–115 (OT)	86–77	74–87	87–86 (OT)	88–92
(B1) Coca-Cola Tigers	3–1	(A2) Sta. Lucia Realtors	85–70	87–90	94–80	99–93	—

==== Third place playoff ====
Team 1	Score	Team 2
(A1) Alaska Aces	102–70	(A2) Sta. Lucia Realtors

==== Finals ====
Team 1	Series	Team 2	Game 1	Game 2	Game 3	Game 4	Game 5	Game 6	Game 7
(B1) Coca-Cola Tigers	2–4	(B2) Talk 'N Text Phone Pals	93–79	92–89	59–67	91–99	92–97 (OT)	76–78	—

== 2003 PBA Invitational championship ==
=== Qualification ===
==== PBA Philippine Cup ====
Combined standings from the 2002 PBA All-Filipino Cup:

- Top 5 teams qualify outright
- Bottom 5 teams proceed to last-chance qualifying Mabuhay Cup

Pos	Team	W	L	PCT	GB	Qualification
1	Batang Red Bull Thunder	14	4	.778	—	Qualify to Invitational tournament
2	San Miguel Beermen	12	6	.667	2	Qualify to Invitational tournament
3	Coca-Cola Tigers	11	7	.611	3	Qualify to Invitational tournament
4	Talk 'N Text Phone Pals	10	8	.556	4	Qualify to Invitational tournament
5	FedEx Express	10	8	.556	4	Qualify to Invitational tournament
6	Alaska Aces	9	9	.500	5	Proceed to Mabuhay Cup
7	Sta. Lucia Realtors	8	10	.444	6	Proceed to Mabuhay Cup
8	Barangay Ginebra Kings	6	12	.333	8	Proceed to Mabuhay Cup
9	Shell Turbo Chargers	5	13	.278	9	Proceed to Mabuhay Cup
10	Purefoods TJ Hotdogs	5	13	.278	9	Proceed to Mabuhay Cup

Source: PBA.ph

==== PBA-Samsung Mabuhay Cup ====
Pos	Team	W	L	PCT	GB	Qualification
1	Alaska Aces	4	0	1.000	—	Qualify to Invitational tournament
2	Barangay Ginebra Kings	2	2	.500	2	
3	Sta. Lucia Realtors	2	2	.500	2	
4	Shell Turbo Chargers	2	2	.500	2	
5	Purefoods TJ Hotdogs	0	4	.000	4	

Source: PBA.ph

=== Elimination round ===
==== Group A ====
Pos	Team	W	L	PCT	GB	Qualification
1	FedEx Express	3	1	.750 (Note: Head-to-head quotient: FedEx 1.032, Red Bull 1.025, Talk 'N Text 0.949)	—	Semifinals
2	Red Bull Barako	3	1	.750	—	Semifinals
3	Talk 'N Text Phone Pals	3	1	.750	—	
4	KK Novi Sad (Yugoslavia) (G)	1	3	.250	2	
5	Yonsei University (South Korea) (G)	0	4	.000	3	

Source: PBA.ph
(G) Guests

==== Group B ====
Pos	Team	W	L	PCT	GB	Qualification
1	Alaska Aces	4	0	1.000	—	Semifinals
2	Coca-Cola Tigers	3	1	.750	1	Semifinals
3	San Miguel Beermen	2	2	.500	2	
4	Cebuana Lhuillier (Philippine national team) (G)	1	3	.250	3	
5	Magnolia-Jilin (China) (G)	0	4	.000	4	

Source: PBA.ph
(G) Guests

=== Playoffs ===
Semifinals (Single elimination)
A1	FedEx	83
B2	Coca-Cola	91
B1	Alaska	95
A2	Red Bull	87

Finals (Best-of-3)
B2	Coca-Cola	1
B1	Alaska	2
Third-place playoff
A1	FedEx	99
A2	Red Bull	84

=== Finals ===
Team 1	Series	Team 2	Game 1	Game 2	Game 3
(B1) Alaska Aces	2–1	(B2) Coca-Cola Tigers	81–94	78–76 (OT)	91–86

== 2003 PBA Reinforced Conference ==
=== Elimination round ===
==== Group A ====
Pos	Team	W	L	PCT	GB	Qualification
1	Sta. Lucia Realtors	8	5	.615	—	Quarterfinals
2	FedEx Express	5	8	.385	3	Quarterfinals
3	San Miguel Beermen	5	8	.385	3	Quarterfinals
4	Alaska Aces	4	9	.308 (Note: Fourth-seed playoff: Alaska 93–88 Purefoods)	4	Quarterfinals
5	Purefoods TJ Hotdogs	4	9	.308	4	

Source: PBA.ph

==== Group B ====
Pos	Team	W	L	PCT	GB	Qualification
1	Red Bull Barako	11	2	.846	—	Quarterfinals
2	Coca-Cola Tigers	11	2	.846	—	Quarterfinals
3	Barangay Ginebra Kings	7	6	.538	4	Quarterfinals
4	Talk 'N Text Phone Pals	7	6	.538	4	Quarterfinals
5	Shell Turbo Chargers	3	10	.231	8	

Source: PBA.ph

=== Playoffs ===
Quarterfinals (Best-of-3)
A1	Sta. Lucia	2
A4	Alaska	1
A2	FedEx	0
A3	San Miguel	2
B1	Red Bull	1
B4	Talk 'N Text	2
B2	Coca-Cola	2
B3	Barangay Ginebra	1

Semifinals (Best-of-5)
A1	Sta. Lucia	0
A3	San Miguel	3
B4	Talk 'N Text	0
B2	Coca-Cola	3

Finals (Best-of-7)
A3	San Miguel	3
B2	Coca-Cola	4
Third place
B4	Talk 'N Text	123
A1	Sta. Lucia	106

==== Quarterfinals ====
Team 1	Series	Team 2	Game 1	Game 2	Game 3
(A1) Sta. Lucia Realtors	2–1	(A4) Alaska Aces	88–79	84–95	88–86
(B1) Red Bull Barako	1–2	(B4) Talk 'N Text Phone Pals	116–120	99–80	81–95
(A2) FedEx Express	0–2	(A3) San Miguel Beermen	92–97	90–100	—
(B2) Coca-Cola Tigers	2–1	(B3) Barangay Ginebra Kings	94–104	85–77	92–86

==== Semifinals ====
Team 1	Series	Team 2	Game 1	Game 2	Game 3	Game 4	Game 5
(A1) Sta. Lucia Realtors	0–3	(A3) San Miguel Beermen	88–109	86–101	96–110	—	—
(B2) Coca-Cola Tigers	3–0	(B4) Talk 'N Text Phone Pals	86–73	109–105	101–81	—	—

==== Third place playoff ====
Team 1	Score	Team 2
(A1) Sta. Lucia Realtors	106–123	(B4) Talk 'N Text Phone Pals

==== Finals ====
Team 1	Series	Team 2	Game 1	Game 2	Game 3	Game 4	Game 5	Game 6	Game 7
(B2) Coca-Cola Tigers	4–3	(A3) San Miguel Beermen	81–84	103–79	81–86	87–84	86–84	80–85	92–84

== Awards ==
- Most Valuable Player: Asi Taulava (Talk 'N Text)
- Rookie of the Year: Jimmy Alapag (Talk 'N Text)
- Sportsmanship Award: Patrick Fran
- Most Improved Player: Rafi Reavis (Coca-Cola)
- Defensive Player of the Year: Rudy Hatfield (Coca-Cola)
- Mythical Five
  - Asi Taulava (Talk 'N Text)
  - Jimmy Alapag (Talk 'N Text)
  - Jeffrey Cariaso (Coca-Cola)
  - Rudy Hatfield (Coca-Cola)
  - Dennis Espino (Sta. Lucia)
- Mythical Second Team
  - Johnny Abarrientos (Coca-Cola)
  - Harvey Carey (Talk 'N Text)
  - Marlou Aquino (Sta. Lucia)
  - John Arigo (Alaska)
  - Don Allado (Alaska)
- All Defensive Team
  - Asi Taulava (Talk 'N Text)
  - Rudy Hatfield (Coca-Cola)
  - Marlou Aquino (Sta. Lucia)
  - Patrick Fran (Talk 'N Text)
  - Willie Miller (Red Bull)
- Gawad Emerson Coseteng Lifetime Achievement Award: Leo Prieto

=== Awards given by PBA Press Corps ===
- Coach of the Year: Chot Reyes (Coca-Cola)
- Mr. Quality Minutes: Renren Ritualo (Fedex)
- Referee of the Year: Ogie Bernarte
- Darling of the Media: Asi Taulava (Talk 'N Text)

== Cumulative standings ==
Pos	Team	Pld	W	L	PCT	Best finish
1	Batang Red Bull Thunder	43	30	13	.698	Semifinalist
2	Coca-Cola Tigers	65	44	21	.677	Champions
3	Talk 'N Text Phone Pals	56	32	24	.571	Champions
4	Alaska Aces	56	31	25	.554	Champions
5	San Miguel Beermen	51	28	23	.549	Finalist
6	FedEx Express	43	21	22	.488	Third place
7	Sta. Lucia Realtors	50	23	27	.460	Semifinalist
8	Barangay Ginebra Kings	41	16	25	.390	Quarterfinalist
9	Shell Turbo Chargers	35	10	25	.286	Elimination round
10	Purefoods TJ Hotdogs	36	9	27	.250	Elimination round
11	KK Novi Sad (G)	4	1	3	.250	Elimination round
12	Cebuana Lhuillier (G)	4	1	3	.250	Elimination round
13	Yonsei University (G)	4	0	4	.000	Elimination round
14	Magnolia-Jilin (G)	4	0	4	.000	Elimination round

(G) Guests

=== Elimination round ===
- The Mabuhay Cup records are treated as if they're elimination round games.

Pos	Team	Pld	W	L	PCT
1	Batang Red Bull Thunder	35	28	7	.800
2	Coca-Cola Tigers	35	25	10	.714
3	Alaska Aces	39	21	18	.538
4	Talk 'N Text Phone Pals	35	20	15	.571
5	San Miguel Beermen	35	19	16	.543
6	FedEx Express	35	18	17	.514
7	Sta. Lucia Realtors	35	18	17	.514
8	Barangay Ginebra Kings	35	15	20	.429
9	Shell Turbo Chargers	35	10	25	.286
10	Purefoods TJ Hotdogs	35	9	26	.257
11	KK Novi Sad (G)	4	1	3	.250
12	Cebuana Lhuillier (G)	4	1	3	.250
13	Yonsei University (G)	4	0	4	.000
14	Magnolia-Jilin (G)	4	0	4	.000

(G) Guests

=== Playoffs ===
Pos	Team	Pld	W	L
1	Coca-Cola Tigers	30	19	11
2	Talk 'N Text Phone Pals	21	12	9
3	Alaska Aces	17	10	7
4	San Miguel Beermen	16	9	7
5	Sta. Lucia Realtors	15	5	10
6	FedEx Express	8	3	5
7	Batang Red Bull Thunder	8	2	6
8	Barangay Ginebra Kings	6	1	5
9	Purefoods TJ Hotdogs	1	0	1
10	Shell Turbo Chargers	0	0	0
11	KK Novi Sad (G)	0	0	0
12	Cebuana Lhuillier (G)	0	0	0
13	Yonsei University (G)	0	0	0
14	Magnolia-Jilin (G)	0	0	0

(G) Guests
