= 2003 PBA Reinforced Conference =

Philippine basketball tournament

- Duration: August 30 – December 14, 2003
- TV partner(s): NBN/IBC

Finals
- Champions: Coca Cola Tigers
- Runners-up: San Miguel Beermen

Awards
- Best Player: Rudy Hatfield (Coca Cola Tigers)
- Best Import: Artemus McClary (Coca Cola Tigers)
- Finals MVP: Jeffrey Cariaso (Coca Cola Tigers)

PBA Reinforced Conference chronology
- < 1989

PBA conference chronology
- < 2003 Invitational 2004 Fiesta >

The 2003 Philippine Basketball Association (PBA) PBA Reinforced Conference, or known as the 2003 Samsung-PBA Reinforced Conference, was the third conference of the 2003 PBA season. It started on August 30 and ended on December 14, 2003. The tournament requires an import or a pure-foreign player for each team.

== Format ==
The following format will be observed for the duration of the conference:

- The teams were divided into 2 groups.

Group A:

1. Alaska Aces
2. FedEx Express
3. Purefoods TJ Hotdogs
4. San Miguel Beermen
5. Sta. Lucia Realtors

Group B:

1. Barangay Ginebra Kings
2. Coca-Cola Tigers
3. Red Bull Barako
4. Shell Turbo Chargers
5. Talk 'N Text Phone Pals

- Teams in a group will play each other twice and in the other group once; 13 games per team; Teams are then seeded by basis on win–loss records. Ties are broken among point differentials of the tied teams.
- The top four teams per group will qualify to the quarterfinal round.
- Best-of-three quarterfinal pairings:
- G1: #1 vs. #4 / #2 vs. #3
- G2: #1 vs. #4 / #2 vs. #3
- The two winners in each group will play in the Best-of-five semifinals.
- The two remaining teams that came out on top in their respective group will play in the Best-of-seven championship series. Losers of the semifinal series will battle for a one-game playoff for third place.

== Imports ==
The following is the list of imports with the replacement imports being highlighted. GP is the number of games played in the conference.

Team	Name	GP	Debut	Game Result (Total points)
Alaska Aces	(United States) Chris Carrawell	3	September 3 vs Sta.Lucia	78-82 loss (17 pts)
Alaska Aces	(United States) Isaac Fontaine	14	September 17 vs Purefoods	97-91 win (38 pts)
Barangay Ginebra Kings	(United States) Ricky Price	9	August 31 vs SMB	85-82 win
Barangay Ginebra Kings	(United States) Rosell Ellis	7	October 15 vs TNT	95-90 win (25 pts)
Red Bull Barako	(United States) Ramel Lloyd	3	August 30 vs FedEx in Baguio City	100-92 win (43 pts)
Red Bull Barako	(United States) Scott Burrell	13	September 14 vs Sta.Lucia	89-74 win (19 pts)
Coca Cola Tigers	(United States) Artemus McClary	25	September 3 vs Purefoods	97-87 win
FedEx Express	(United States) Terrence Shannon	15	August 30 vs Red Bull in Baguio City	92-100 loss (29 pts)
Purefoods TJ Hotdogs	(United States) Harold Arceneaux	6	September 3 vs Coca-Cola	87-97 loss
Purefoods TJ Hotdogs	(United States) Lenny Cooke	8	October 3 vs FedEx	105-121 loss (49 pts)
San Miguel Beermen	(United States) Shea Seals	3	September 5 vs FedEx	76-84 loss (14 pts)
San Miguel Beermen	(United States) Eric Dailey	1	September 12 vs Purefoods	76-77 loss
San Miguel Beermen	(United States) Kwan Johnson	18	September 26 vs Purefoods	85-73 win (26 pts)
San Miguel Beermen	(United States) Cedric Ceballos	1	December 5 vs Coca-Cola (finals game 3)	86-81 win (11 pts)
Shell Turbo Chargers	(United States) Sedric Webber	4	August 31 vs TNT	114-101 win (28 pts)
Shell Turbo Chargers	(United States) Tim Breaux	1	September 27 vs Brgy.Ginebra in Calape, Bohol	96-110 loss (10 pts)
Shell Turbo Chargers	(United States) Jamal Kendrick	6	October 1 vs SMB	
Sta. Lucia Realtors	(United States) Nate James	8	September 3 vs Alaska	82-78 win (31 pts)
Sta. Lucia Realtors	(United States) Damian Owens	5	October 12 vs Purefoods	93-84 win
Sta. Lucia Realtors	(United States) Raymond Tutt	5	November 12 vs Alaska	88-79 win (19 pts)
Talk 'N Text Phone Pals	(United States) Damian Cantrell	20	August 31 vs Shell	101-114 loss (34 pts)

== Elimination round ==
Qualified for quarterfinals

=== Group A ===
Pos	Team	W	L	PCT	GB	Qualification
1	Sta. Lucia Realtors	8	5	.615	—	Quarterfinals
2	FedEx Express	5	8	.385	3	Quarterfinals
3	San Miguel Beermen	5	8	.385	3	Quarterfinals
4	Alaska Aces	4	9	.308 (Note: Fourth-seed playoff: Alaska 93–88 Purefoods)	4	Quarterfinals
5	Purefoods TJ Hotdogs	4	9	.308	4	

Source: PBA.ph

==== Fourth seed playoff ====
NBN/IBC

November 7

recap

Alaska Aces 93, Purefoods TJ Hotdogs 88

Cuneta Astrodome, Pasay

=== Group B ===
Pos	Team	W	L	PCT	GB	Qualification
1	Red Bull Barako	11	2	.846	—	Quarterfinals
2	Coca-Cola Tigers	11	2	.846	—	Quarterfinals
3	Barangay Ginebra Kings	7	6	.538	4	Quarterfinals
4	Talk 'N Text Phone Pals	7	6	.538	4	Quarterfinals
5	Shell Turbo Chargers	3	10	.231	8	

Source: PBA.ph

Red Bull had one win and two losses in their first three games with Ramel Lloyd as their import. When Scott Burrell, an eight-year NBA veteran and member of the 1998 NBA champion Chicago Bulls, came in to replaced Lloyd, the Barakos went on a 10-game winning streak and finish on top of Group B standings in a tie with Coca-Cola.

== Bracket ==
Quarterfinals (Best-of-3)
A1	Sta. Lucia	2
A4	Alaska	1
A2	FedEx	0
A3	San Miguel	2
B1	Red Bull	1
B4	Talk 'N Text	2
B2	Coca-Cola	2
B3	Barangay Ginebra	1

Semifinals (Best-of-5)
A1	Sta. Lucia	0
A3	San Miguel	3
B4	Talk 'N Text	0
B2	Coca-Cola	3

Finals (Best-of-7)
A3	San Miguel	3
B2	Coca-Cola	4
Third place
B4	Talk 'N Text	123
A1	Sta. Lucia	106

== Quarterfinals ==
=== (A1) Sta. Lucia vs (A4) Alaska ===
NBN/IBC

November 12

recap

Sta. Lucia Realtors 88, Alaska Aces 79

PhilSports Arena, Pasig

NBN/IBC

November 16

Sta. Lucia Realtors 84, Alaska Aces 95

Araneta Coliseum, Quezon City

NBN/IBC

November 21

recap

Sta. Lucia Realtors 88, Alaska Aces 86
Sta.Lucia wins series, 2–1

Araneta Coliseum, Quezon City

=== (B1) Red Bull vs. (B4) Talk 'N Text ===
NBN/IBC

November 9

recap

Red Bull Barako 116, Talk 'N Text Phone Pals 120

Araneta Coliseum, Quezon City

NBN/IBC

November 14

Red Bull Barako 99, Talk 'N Text Phone Pals 80

Cuneta Astrodome, Pasay

NBN/IBC

November 19

recap

Red Bull Barako 81, Talk 'N Text Phone Pals 95
Talk 'N Text wins series, 2–1

PhilSports Arena, Pasig

=== (A2) FedEx vs. (A3) San Miguel ===
NBN/IBC

November 12

FedEx Express 92, San Miguel Beermen 97

PhilSports Arena, Pasig

NBN/IBC

November 16

recap

FedEx Express 90, San Miguel Beermen 100
San Miguel wins series, 2–0

Araneta Coliseum, Quezon City

=== (B2) Coca Cola vs. (B3) Barangay Ginebra ===
NBN/IBC

November 9

Coca Cola Tigers 94, Barangay Ginebra Kings 104

Araneta Coliseum, Quezon City

NBN/IBC

November 14

recap

Coca Cola Tigers 85, Barangay Ginebra Kings 77

Cuneta Astrodome, Pasay

NBN/IBC

November 19

Coca Cola Tigers 92, Barangay Ginebra Kings 86
Coca Cola wins series, 2–1

PhilSports Arena, Pasig

== Semifinals ==
=== (A1) Sta. Lucia vs. (A3) San Miguel ===
NBN/IBC

November 23

Sta. Lucia Realtors 88, San Miguel Beermen 109

Araneta Coliseum, Quezon City

NBN/IBC

November 26

recap

Sta. Lucia Realtors 86, San Miguel Beermen 101

Philsports Arena, Pasig

NBN/IBC

November 28

Sta. Lucia Realtors 96, San Miguel Beermen 110
San Miguel wins series, 3–0

Cuneta Astrodome, Pasay

=== (B2) Coca Cola vs. (B4) Talk 'N Text ===
NBN/IBC

November 23

recap

Coca Cola Tigers 88, Talk 'N Text Phone Pals 73

Araneta Coliseum, Quezon City

NBN/IBC

November 26

Coca Cola Tigers 109, Talk 'N Text Phone Pals 105

Philsports Arena, Pasig

NBN/IBC

November 28

recap

Coca Cola Tigers 101, Talk 'N Text Phone Pals 81
Coca-Cola wins series, 3–0

Cuneta Astrodome, Pasay

== Third place playoff ==
NBN/IBC

November 30

Sta. Lucia Realtors 106, Talk 'N Text Phone Pals 123

Araneta Coliseum, Quezon City

== Finals ==
NBN/IBC

November 30

Coca Cola Tigers 81, San Miguel Beermen 84

Araneta Coliseum, Quezon City

NBN/IBC

December 3

Coca Cola Tigers 103, San Miguel Beermen 79

Araneta Coliseum, Quezon City

NBN/IBC

December 5

Coca Cola Tigers 81, San Miguel Beermen 86

Araneta Coliseum, Quezon City

NBN/IBC

December 7

Coca Cola Tigers 87, San Miguel Beermen 84

Araneta Coliseum, Quezon City

NBN/IBC

December 10

Coca Cola Tigers 86, San Miguel Beermen 84

Cuneta Astrodome, Pasay

NBN/IBC

December 12

Coca Cola Tigers 80, San Miguel Beermen 85

Philsports Arena, Pasig

NBN/IBC

December 14

Coca Cola Tigers 92, San Miguel Beermen 84
Coca Cola wins series, 4–3

Araneta Coliseum, Quezon City
