= PBA on NBN/IBC =

Branding used for PBA telecasts on NBN and IBC in the Philippines

- Genre: PBA game telecasts
- Presented by: various PBA on NBN/IBC commentators
- Country of origin: Philippines
- Original languages: Filipino (NBN); English (NBN and IBC)
- No. of episodes: 245

Production
- Production locations: i-Sports Office, Makati; NBN Studios, Quezon City
- Camera setup: Multiple-camera setup
- Running time: 150 minutes or until game ends
- Production company: Summit Sports

Original release
- Network: NBN; IBC
- Release: February 23 – December 14, 2003

Related
- PBA on Viva TV; PBA on ABC; PBA on MBS

PBA on NBN and PBA on IBC is a Philippine television sports presentation show broadcast by NBN and IBC. It aired from February 23 to December 14, 2003. The consist of branding used for presentation of Philippine Basketball Association games produced by Summit Sports.

== Overview ==
The consortium of NBN and IBC took over the league's TV coverage after winning the TV rights over the league's longtime TV partner Vintage Television on November 8, 2002. The league considered the NBN-IBC bid because they can provide a wider coverage of the games not only in Metro Manila but also throughout the provinces. The consortium signed an agreement to the PBA to cover the games for three years, paying the league for almost P670 million. NBN began airing the PBA games with the opening of the 2003 PBA season on February 23, 2003, while IBC first aired the PBA games on March 16, 2003. The first week's ratings of the games over NBN were negligible when compared to those of IBC which had telecast the games for several years, while even the two networks combined ratings were way below those of Viva TV in 2002. The use of two networks to broadcast the PBA also led to an experiment during the first few months of the season where NBN and IBC would air separate telecasts of a game aimed at different audiences, NBN's broadcasts were more traditionally styled, while IBC's broadcasts were aimed at a younger audience, utilizing a separate pool of younger personalities. The format was eventually dropped and replaced with straight simulcasts later on in the season.

Due to allegations by IBC that NBN had not paid close to 30 million pesos in rights fees, IBC stopped broadcasting PBA games at the end of October 2003. NBN would continue on until the finals of the 2003 Reinforced Conference. The PBA gave the consortium a formal notice on December 1, 2003, to settle their debts of unpaid rights fees, that reached up to P134 million, plus the P60 million penalty due to the stoppage of IBC to simulcast the league's games, else their contract will be terminated. A bid would be held for a new contract, where the Associated Broadcasting Company (now TV5 Network, Inc.) was awarded the broadcast rights for the league beginning in the 2004 season.

== Commentators ==
=== Play-by-play ===
NBN's time/score graphic during the 2003 Reinforced Conference Finals.

- Sandi Geronimo
- Mico Halili
- TJ Manotoc
- Boom Gonzales
- Carlo Del Carmen
- Sev Sarmenta
- Vitto Lazatin
- Noel Zarate
- Paolo Trillo

=== Analyst ===
- Norman Black
- Ramon Fernandez
- Jayvee Gayoso
- Vic Ycasiano
- Andrew Cruz
- Dominic Uy
- Danny Francisco
- Quinito Henson
- Leo Isaac
- Yeng Guiao

=== Courtside Reporters ===
- Patricia Bermudez-Hizon
- Jannelle So
- Mabel Reyes
- Chiqui Roa-Puno
- Lala Roque
- Paolo Trillo
- Mark Zambrano

== See also ==
- Philippine Basketball Association
- List of programs broadcast by People's Television Network

Preceded by PBA on Viva TV	PBA TV coverage partners 2003	Succeeded by PBA on ABC
