= 2001 PBA Governors' Cup =

- Duration: September 8 – December 16, 2001
- TV partner(s): Viva TV on IBC

Finals
- Champions: Sta. Lucia Realtors
- Runners-up: San Miguel Beermen

Awards
- Best Player: Danny Ildefonso (San Miguel Beermen)
- Best Import: Damian Owens (Sta. Lucia Realtors)
- Finals MVP: Gerald Francisco (Sta. Lucia Realtors)

PBA Governors' Cup chronology
- < 2000 2002 >

PBA conference chronology
- < 2001 Commissioner's 2002 Governors' >

The 2001 Philippine Basketball Association (PBA) Governors' Cup was the third conference of the 2001 PBA season. It started on September 8 and ended on December 16. The tournament is an import-laden format, which requires an import or a pure-foreign player for each team.

== Format ==
The following format will be observed for the duration of the conference:

- The teams were divided into 2 groups.

Group A:

1. Alaska Aces
2. Batang Red Bull Thunder
3. Purefoods TJ Hotdogs
4. Shell Turbo Chargers
5. Sta. Lucia Realtors

Group B:

1. Barangay Ginebra Kings
2. Pop Cola Panthers
3. San Miguel Beermen
4. Talk 'N Text Phone Pals
5. Tanduay Rhum Masters

- Teams in a group will play against each other twice and against teams in the other group once; 13 games per team.
- The top eight teams after the eliminations will advance to the quarterfinals.
- Quarterfinals:
  - Top four teams will have a twice-to-beat advantage against their opponent.
  - QF1: #1 vs. #8
  - QF2: #2 vs. #7
  - QF3: #3 vs. #6
  - QF4: #4 vs. #5
- Best-of-five semifinals:
  - SF1: QF1 vs. QF4
  - SF2: QF2 vs. QF3
- Third-place playoff: losers of the semifinals
- Best-of-seven finals: winners of the semifinals

== Imports ==
The following is the list of imports with the replacement imports being highlighted. GP is the number of games played in the conference.

Team	Name	GP
Alaska Aces	(United States) Sean Chambers	3
Alaska Aces	(United States) Dexter Boney	4
Alaska Aces	(United States) Ron Riley	7
Barangay Ginebra Kings	(United States) Mark Jones	11
Barangay Ginebra Kings	(United States) Bubba Wells	4
Batang Red Bull Thunder	(United States) Raymond Tutt	14
Pop Cola Panthers	(United States) Rosell Ellis	20
Purefoods TJ Hotdogs	(United States) Derrick Brown	13
San Miguel Beermen	(United States) Lamont Strothers	23
Shell Turbo Chargers	(United States) Askia Jones	19
Sta. Lucia Realtors	(United States) Damian Owens	25
Talk 'N Text Phone Pals	(United States) Brandon Williams	13
Talk 'N Text Phone Pals	(United States) Todd Bernard	1
Tanduay Rhum Masters	(United States) Maurice Bell	2
Tanduay Rhum Masters	(United States) Billy Thomas	10

== Elimination round ==
=== Team standings ===
Pos	Team	W	L	PCT	GB	Qualification
1	Shell Turbo Chargers	8	5	.615 (Note: Head-to-head record: Shell 1–1 Sta. Lucia; Shell +10, Sta. Lucia −10)	—	Twice-to-beat in the quarterfinals
2	Sta. Lucia Realtors	8	5	.615	—	Twice-to-beat in the quarterfinals
3	Pop Cola Panthers	7	6	.538 (Note: Head-to-head record: Pop Cola 3–1, San Miguel 2–2, Talk 'N Text 1–3)	1	Twice-to-beat in the quarterfinals
4	San Miguel Beermen	7	6	.538	1	Twice-to-beat in the quarterfinals
5	Talk 'N Text Phone Pals	7	6	.538	1	Twice-to-win in the quarterfinals
6	Alaska Aces	6	7	.462 (Note: Head-to-head differential: Alaska +10, Red Bull +9, Barangay Ginebra −19)	2	Twice-to-win in the quarterfinals
7	Batang Red Bull Thunder	6	7	.462	2	Twice-to-win in the quarterfinals
8	Barangay Ginebra Kings	6	7	.462	2	Twice-to-win in the quarterfinals
9	Tanduay Rhum Masters	5	8	.385 (Note: Head-to-head record: Tanduay 1–0 Purefoods)	3	
10	Purefoods TJ Hotdogs	5	8	.385	3	

Source: PBA.ph

== Bracket ==
Quarterfinals (Top 4 twice-to-beat)
1	Shell	75	106
8	Ginebra	97	87
4	San Miguel	77
5	Talk 'N Text	63
2	Sta. Lucia	97
7	Red Bull	93
3	Pop Cola	88
6	Alaska	78

Semifinals (Best-of-5)
1	Shell	0
4	San Miguel	3
2	Sta. Lucia	3
3	Pop Cola	2

Finals (Best-of-7)
4	San Miguel	2
2	Sta. Lucia	4
Third-place playoff
1	Shell	96
3	Pop Cola	87

== Quarterfinals ==
=== (1) Shell vs. (8) Barangay Ginebra ===
Viva TV

November 16

recap

Shell Turbo Chargers 75, Barangay Ginebra Kings 97

Philsports Arena, Pasig

Viva TV

November 21

recap

Shell Turbo Chargers 106, Barangay Ginebra Kings 87
Shell wins series in two games

Philsports Arena, Pasig

=== (2) Sta. Lucia vs. (7) Red Bull ===
Viva TV

November 18

recap

Sta. Lucia Realtors 97, Batang Red Bull Thunder 93
Sta. Lucia wins series in one game

Araneta Coliseum, Quezon City

=== (3) Pop Cola vs. (6) Alaska ===
Viva TV

November 18

Pop Cola Panthers 88, Alaska Aces 78
Pop Cola wins series in one game

Araneta Coliseum, Quezon City

=== (4) San Miguel vs. (5) Talk 'N Text ===
Viva TV

November 16

San Miguel Beermen 77, Talk 'N Text Phone Pals 63
San Miguel wins series in one game

Philsports Arena, Pasig

== Semifinals ==
=== (1) Shell vs. (4) San Miguel ===
Viva TV

November 23

Shell Turbo Chargers 84, San Miguel Beermen 89

Ynares Center, Antipolo

Viva TV

November 25

recap

Shell Turbo Chargers 70, San Miguel Beermen 83

Araneta Coliseum, Quezon City

Viva TV

November 28

recap

Shell Turbo Chargers 88, San Miguel Beermen 92 (OT)
San Miguel wins series, 3–0

Philsports Arena, Pasig

=== (2) Sta. Lucia vs. (3) Pop Cola ===
Viva TV

November 23

recap

Sta. Lucia Realtors 75, Pop Cola Panthers 76

Ynares Center, Antipolo

Viva TV

November 25

Sta. Lucia Realtors 76, Pop Cola Panthers 69

Araneta Coliseum, Quezon City

Viva TV

November 28

Sta. Lucia Realtors 76, Pop Cola Panthers 86

Philsports Arena, Pasig

Viva TV

November 30

recap

Sta. Lucia Realtors 97, Pop Cola Panthers 80

Ynares Center, Antipolo

Viva TV

December 2

recap

Sta. Lucia Realtors 86, Pop Cola Panthers 74
Sta.Lucia wins series, 3–2

Araneta Coliseum, Quezon City

== Third place playoff ==
Viva TV

December 5

Shell Turbo Chargers 96, Pop Cola Panthers 87

Araneta Coliseum, Quezon City

== Finals ==
Viva TV

December 5

Sta. Lucia Realtors 86, San Miguel Beermen 80

Araneta Coliseum, Quezon City

Viva TV

December 7

Sta. Lucia Realtors 78, San Miguel Beermen 86

Philsports Arena, Pasig

Viva TV

December 9

Sta. Lucia Realtors 83, San Miguel Beermen 74

Araneta Coliseum, Quezon City

Viva TV

December 12

Sta. Lucia Realtors 73, San Miguel Beermen 106

Philsports Arena, Pasig

Viva TV

December 14

Sta. Lucia Realtors 85, San Miguel Beermen 71

Araneta Coliseum, Quezon City

Viva TV

December 16

Sta. Lucia Realtors 75, San Miguel Beermen 72
Sta. Lucia wins series, 4–2

Araneta Coliseum, Quezon City
