= 2001 PBA draft =

Player selection in Philippine basketball

General information
- Date(s): January 14, 2001
- Time: 3:00 pm
- Location: Glorietta Activity Center, Makati
- Network(s): Viva TV on IBC

Overview
- League: Philippine Basketball Association
- First selection: Willie Miller (Red Bull Thunder)

The 2001 Philippine Basketball Association (PBA) rookie draft was an event at which teams drafted players from the amateur ranks. It was held on January 14, 2001, at the Glorietta Activity Center at Makati.

== Round 1 ==
*	Mythical team member	^{#}	All-star

Pick	Player	Country of origin*	PBA team	College
1	Willie Miller*	Philippines	Red Bull Thunder	Letran
2	Mike Hrabak	United States	Shell Turbo Chargers	Central Arizona
3	Mark Caguioa*	Philippines	Barangay Ginebra Kings	Glendale
4	Gilbert Demape	Philippines	Mobiline Phone Pals	Cebu Tech
5	John Arigo^{#}	United States	Alaska Aces	North Florida
6	Francis Adriano	Philippines	Sta. Lucia Realtors	Far Eastern / PSBA
7	Norman Gonzales	Philippines	Mobiline Phone Pals	San Beda
8	Marvin Ortiguerra	Philippines	Sta. Lucia Realtors	Santo Tomas
9	Roger Yap*	Philippines	Purefoods Tender Juicy Hotdogs	San Jose
10	Joey Mente	Philippines	San Miguel Beermen	Lyceum

== Round 2 ==
Pick	Player	Country of origin*	PBA team	College
11	Oliver Agapito	Philippines	Tanduay Rhum Masters	St. Benilde
12	Anton Villoria	Philippines	Red Bull Thunder	Letran
13	Marlon Basco	Philippines	Barangay Ginebra Kings	Luzon Colleges
14	Jovy Sese	Philippines	Pop Cola Panthers	Manila
15	Ricky Calimag	Philippines	Tanduay Rhum Masters	San Beda
16	Jojo Tangkay	Philippines	Sta. Lucia Realtors	Southwestern
17	Charles de Jesus	United States	Tanduay Rhum Masters	Western Wyoming
18	Kenny Evans	United States	Alaska Aces	San Francisco State
19	Jomar Tierra	Philippines	San Miguel Beermen	East
20	Ato Morano	Philippines	Pop Cola Panthers	San Beda

== Round 3 ==
Pick	Player	Country of origin*	PBA team	College
21	Dave Bautista	Philippines	Red Bull Thunder	Angeles University Foundation
22	Fernan Dino Manuel	Philippines	Shell Turbo Chargers	San Beda College
23	Marlon Piodo	Philippines	Barangay Ginebra Kings	San Jose
24	Ramon Jose	Philippines	Pop Cola Panthers	De La Salle
25	June Longalong	Philippines	Mobiline Phone Pals	Perpetual Help
26	Michael Almonte	Philippines	Sta. Lucia Realtors	San Jose
27	Allan Salangsang	Philippines	Tanduay Rhum Masters	Letran
28	Michael Garcia	Philippines	Alaska Aces	Letran
29	Paul Guerrero	Philippines	Purefoods Tender Juicy Hotdogs	Letran
30	Jeremy Anciete	United States	San Miguel Beermen	North Park

== Round 4 ==
Pick	Player	Country of origin*	PBA team	College
31	Dominic Uy	Philippines	Tanduay Rhum Masters	De La Salle
32	Maoi Roca	Philippines	Tanduay Rhum Masters	De La Salle
33	Rolando Basilides	Philippines	Pop Cola Panthers	San Sebastian
34	Ryan Bernardo	Philippines	Mobiline Phone Pals	Santo Tomas
35	Francis Zamora	Philippines	Sta. Lucia Realtors	De La Salle
36	Jay Magat	Philippines	Tanduay Rhum Masters	PSBA
37	Jonathan de Guzman	Philippines	Purefoods Tender Juicy Hotdogs	Adamson
38	Calijohn Orfrecio	Philippines	San Miguel Beermen	De La Salle

== Round 5 ==
*	Mythical team member	^{#}	All-star

Pick	Player	Country of origin*	PBA team	College
39	David Friedhof	United States	Tanduay Rhum Masters	Apple Valley High School
40	Arvin Adovo	Philippines	Shell Turbo Chargers	Santo Tomas
41	Joshua Lambert	United States	Pop Cola Panthers	Air Force
42	Jerald Ybañes	Philippines	Mobiline Phone Pals	East
43	Peter June Simon^{#}	Philippines	Sta. Lucia Realtors	University of Mindanao
44	Topex Robinson	Philippines	Tanduay Rhum Masters	San Sebastian
45	Allen Patrimonio	Philippines	San Miguel Beermen	De La Salle
46	Isagani Malindog	Philippines	San Miguel Beermen	National

== Round 6 ==
Pick	Player	Country of origin*	PBA team	College
47	Robert Joseph Villareal	Philippines	Mobiline Phone Pals	University of the East Caloocan
48	Leode Garcia	Philippines	Sta. Lucia Realtors	San Jose

== Note ==
*All players are Filipinos until proven otherwise.
