= 2009–10 Rain or Shine Elasto Painters season =

- Head coach: Caloy Garcia

Philippine Cup results
- Record: 4–14 (22.2%)
- Place: 9th
- Playoff finish: Quarterfinals (by Purefoods 3–2)

Fiesta Conference results
- Record: 9–9 (50%)
- Place: 5th (tied)
- Playoff finish: Quarterfinals (by B-Meg Derby Ace 3–2)

Rain or Shine Elasto Painters seasons

The 2009–10 Rain or Shine Elasto Painters season was the 4th season of the franchise in the Philippine Basketball Association (PBA).

== Key dates ==
- August 2: The 2009 PBA Draft took place in Fort Bonifacio, Taguig.

== Draft picks ==
Round	Pick	Player	Height	Position	Nationality	College
1	5	Jervy Cruz	6 ft. 3 in.	Power forward	Philippines	UST
2	15	Marcy Arellano	5 ft. 9 in.	Point guard	Philippines	UE

== Roster ==
2009–10 Rain or Shine Elasto Painters roster
Players

Pos.	#	POB	Name	Height	Weight	DOB (YYYY–MM–DD)	From
G	1	(Philippines)	Tyrone Tang	5 ft 7 in (1.70 m)	135 lb (61 kg)		De La Salle
G	3	(United States)	Solomon Mercado	6 ft 0 in (1.83 m)	195 lb (88 kg)		Biola
G/F	6	(Philippines)	Jireh Ibañes	6 ft 3 in (1.91 m)	182 lb (83 kg)		UP Diliman
F	7	(Philippines)	Jam Alfad	6 ft 3 in (1.91 m)			San Sebastian
F/C	8	(Philippines)	Jay-R Reyes	6 ft 7 in (2.01 m)	215 lb (98 kg)		UP Diliman
G/F	9	(Philippines)	Jeffrei Chan	6 ft 2 in (1.88 m)	185 lb (84 kg)		Far Eastern
G/F	10	(United States)	Gabe Norwood	6 ft 5 in (1.96 m)	190 lb (86 kg)		George Mason
G	11	(United States)	Don Dulay	5 ft 8 in (1.73 m)	150 lb (68 kg)		El Camino
G	14	(Philippines)	Marcy Arellano	5 ft 9 in (1.75 m)	188 lb (85 kg)		UE
G	18	(Philippines)	Ryan Araña	6 ft 1 in (1.85 m)	180 lb (82 kg)		De La Salle
F	20	(Philippines)	Jervy Cruz	6 ft 3 in (1.91 m)	220 lb (100 kg)		UST
F/C	22	(Philippines)	Mark Telan	6 ft 7 in (2.01 m)	210 lb (95 kg)		De La Salle
F	30	(Philippines)	Allan Salangsang	6 ft 5 in (1.96 m)			Letran
F/C	41	(Philippines)	Mike Hrabak	6 ft 7 in (2.01 m)	215 lb (98 kg)		Central Arizona
F	65	(Philippines)	Eddie Laure	6 ft 4 in (1.93 m)	195 lb (88 kg)		Adamson

Coaches
Head coach
- (Philippines) Caloy Garcia (St. Benilde)
Assistant(s)
- (Philippines) Richard del Rosario (De La Salle)
- (Philippines) Mike Buendia
- (Philippines) Jay Legacion

Legend
- (DP) Unsigned draft pick
- (FA) Free agent
- (S) Suspended
- Injured

== Philippine Cup ==
=== Eliminations ===
==== Standings ====
Pos	Team	W	L	PCT	GB	Qualification
1	Alaska Aces	13	5	.722 (Note: Head-to-head record: Alaska 2–0 San Miguel)	—	Advance to semifinals
2	San Miguel Beermen	13	5	.722	—	Advance to semifinals
3	Purefoods Tender Juicy Giants	12	6	.667 (Note: Head-to-head record: Purefoods 1–1 Barangay Ginebra; Purefoods 0, Barangay Ginebra 0; overall point differential: Purefoods +85, Barangay Ginebra +75)	1	Advance to quarterfinals
4	Barangay Ginebra Kings	12	6	.667	1	Advance to quarterfinals
5	Talk 'N Text Tropang Texters	11	7	.611	2	Advance to quarterfinals
6	Sta. Lucia Realtors	10	8	.556	3	Advance to wildcard round
7	Coca-Cola Tigers	6	12	.333 (Note: Head-to-head record: Burger King 1–1, Coca-Cola; Burger King +10, Coca-Cola −10)	7	Advance to wildcard round
8	Burger King Whoppers	6	12	.333	7	Advance to wildcard round
9	Rain or Shine Elasto Painters	4	14	.222	9	Advance to wildcard round
10	Barako Bull Energy Boosters	3	15	.167	10	
—	Smart Gilas (G)	3	6	.333	5.5	Guest team (Note: Smart Gilas's results do not count in the standings.)

Source: PBA.ph
(G) Guests

==== Game log ====
===== Eliminations =====
2010 PBA Philippine Cup game log
October

Game	Date	Opponent	Score	High points	High rebounds	High assists	Location Attendance	Record
1	October 16	Talk 'N Text	76–85	Cruz, Telan (14)	Telan (20)	Norwood (4)	Araneta Coliseum	0–1
2	October 21	Sta. Lucia	90–95	Araña (19)	Norwood (9)	Tang (5)	Cuneta Astrodome	0–2
3	October 24	Burger King	89–91	Araña (25)	Reyes (14)	Norwood (6)	Gingoog, Misamis Oriental	0–3
4	October 28	Barako Bull	81–89	Norwood (17)	Norwood (7)	Norwood (5)	Araneta Coliseum	0–4

November

Game	Date	Opponent	Score	High points	High rebounds	High assists	Location Attendance	Record
5	November 4	San Miguel	77–93	Norwood, Chan (14)	Laure (11)	Tang (5)	Araneta Coliseum	0–5
6	November 8	Barangay Ginebra	77–86	Reyes, Cruz (14)	Reyes (8)	Mercado (4)	Araneta Coliseum	0–6
7	November 13	Alaska	86–81	Araña (21)	Reyes (13)	Norwood (6)	Ynares Center	1–6
8	November 15	Purefoods	69–103	Araña (20)	Reyes (6)	Norwood (3)	Araneta Coliseum	1–7
9	November 20	Smart Gilas*	87–96				Araneta Coliseum	
10	November 25	Coca Cola	92–84	Mercado (24)	Chan, Telan (6)	Mercado (8)	Araneta Coliseum	2–7

December

Game	Date	Opponent	Score	High points	High rebounds	High assists	Location Attendance	Record
11	December 2	Talk 'N Text	95–93	Araña (20)	Reyes (12)	Chan (5)	Araneta Coliseum	3–7
12	December 6	Burger King	99–101	Norwood (25)	Reyes, Araña (8)	Tang (6)	Araneta Coliseum	3–8
13	December 12	Barangay Ginebra	97–101	Norwood (22)	Cruz (10)	Norwood (7)	Tacloban City	3–9
14	December 18	San Miguel	90–104	Araña (17)	Reyes (12)	Mercado (4)	Araneta Coliseum	3–10
15	December 23	Barako Bull	88–72	Mercado (24)	Chan, Norwood (8)	Mercado (8)	Cuneta Astrodome	4–10

January

Game	Date	Opponent	Score	High points	High rebounds	High assists	Location Attendance	Record
17	January 6	Sta. Lucia	91–95	Norwood (18)	Norwood, 2 others (8)	Mercado (8)	Araneta Coliseum	4–11
18	January 10	Purefoods	88–101	Norwood (29)	Norwood (7)	Mercado (8)	Araneta Coliseum	4–12
19	January 15	Coca Cola	83–105	Norwood, 2 others (14)	Mercado (8)	Norwood, Mercado (6)	Araneta Coliseum	4–13
16	January 22	Alaska	94–95	Mercado (35)	Cruz (9)	Mercado, Araña (3)	Ynares Center	4–14

2009–10 schedule

===== Playoffs =====
2010 PBA Philippine Cup playoffs game log
Wildcard

Game	Date	Opponent	Score	High points	High rebounds	High assists	Location Attendance	Record
1	January 24	Sta. Lucia	90–86	Mercado (18)	Mercado, Chan (7)	Araña (5)	Ynares Center	1–0
2	January 27	Coca Cola	99–84	Mercado (28)	Laure (6)	Mercado (8)	Ynares Center	2–0

Quarterfinals

Game	Date	Opponent	Score	High points	High rebounds	High assists	Location Attendance	Record
1	January 29	Purefoods	85–90	Araña (19)	Reyes (10)	Norwood (6)	Araneta Coliseum	0–1
2	January 31	Purefoods	94–95	Mercado (26)	Norwood (16)	Chan (5)	Araneta Coliseum	0–2
3	February 3	Purefoods	95–92	Chan (17)	Norwood, Cruz (7)	Chan (6)	Araneta Coliseum	1–2
4	February 5	Purefoods	103–100	Mercado (24)	Reyes (12)	Mercado (8)	Araneta Coliseum	2–2
5	February 7	Purefoods	85–95				Araneta Coliseum	2–3

2009–10 schedule

== Fiesta Conference ==
=== Eliminations ===
==== Standings ====
Pos	Team	W	L	PCT	GB	Qualification
1	Talk 'N Text Tropang Texters	15	3	.833	—	Advance to semifinals
2	San Miguel Beermen	13	5	.722 (Note: Second seed playoff: San Miguel 88, Derby Ace 83)	2	Advance to semifinals
3	Derby Ace Llamados	13	5	.722	2	Advance to quarterfinals
4	Alaska Aces	11	7	.611	4	Advance to quarterfinals
5	Barangay Ginebra Kings	9	9	.500 (Note: Fifth seed playoff: Barangay Ginebra 115, Rain or Shine 88)	6	Advance to quarterfinals
6	Rain or Shine Elasto Painters	9	9	.500	6	Advance to wildcard round
7	Coca-Cola Tigers	8	10	.444	7	Advance to wildcard round
8	Sta. Lucia Realtors	5	13	.278	10	Advance to wildcard round
9	Air21 Express	4	14	.222	11	Advance to wildcard round
10	Barako Energy Coffee Masters	3	15	.167	12	

Source: PBA.ph

== Transactions ==
=== Pre-season ===
Rain or Shine Elasto Painters

Players Added

Via Draft

- Jervy Cruz
- Marcy Arellano

Via Free Agency

- Nur Jam Alfad
- Mike Dizon
- Mark Telan (From Coca-Cola)

Via Trade

- Jeffrei Chan (From Barako Bull)
- Mike Hrabak (From Barako Bull)
Players Lost

Via Free Agency

- Mark Andaya
- Mark Isip
- Rob Wainwright

Via Retirement

- Gherome Ejercito
- Denver Lopez

=== Imports recruited ===
Team	Player	Debuted	Final
Rain or Shine Elasto Painters	Jai Lewis (1/2)	March 26, 2010	June 18, 2010
Rain or Shine Elasto Painters	Rod Nealy (2/2)	June 25, 2010	July 18, 2010
