= 2003 Sta. Lucia Realtors season =

- Head coach: Alfrancis Chua
- Owner(s): Sta. Lucia Land

All-Filipino Cup results
- Record: 11–15 (42.3%)
- Place: 4th
- Playoff finish: Semis (lost to Coca Cola)

Mabuhay Cup results
- Record: 2–2 (50%)
- Place: N/A
- Playoff finish: N/A

Reinforced Conference results
- Record: 10–10 (50%)
- Place: 4th
- Playoff finish: Semis (lost to SMB)

Sta. Lucia Realtors seasons

The 2003 Sta. Lucia Realtors season was the 11th season of the franchise in the Philippine Basketball Association (PBA).

== Transactions ==
Players added

Via free agency

- Wilmer Ong (from Brgy.Ginebra)
- Paeng Santos (undrafted in 2001)
- Jomar Tierra (drafted by San Miguel in 2001)
- Jason Webb (returning player; last played for Tanduay in 2001)
- Allan Yu (last played for Tanduay in 2001)

Via trade

- Leo Bat-Og (drafted by Alaska; the Realtors traded their pick Eugene Tejada in exchange)
- Kenneth Duremdes (from Alaska; acquired during draft day, gave up their 5th pick in the 1st and 2nd rounds)
Players lost

Via free agency

- Angelo David (to Talk 'N Text)
- Richard Del Rosario (to Alaska)
- Gherome Ejercito (to FedEx)
- Expedito Falcasantos (to Talk 'N Text)
- Marvin Ortiguerra (to FedEx)
- Omanzie Rodriguez (to FedEx)

== Occurrences ==
Assistant coach Alfrancis Chua was appointed as the new head coach of Sta.Lucia at the start of the season, Chua replaces Norman Black, whose contract wasn't renewed.

In the Reinforced Conference, import Nate James led the Realtors to five wins in eight games he played until an injury forces Sta.Lucia to bring back Damian Owens. Starting the best-of-three quarterfinal series against Alaska, the Realtors tapped former Red Bull import Ray Tutt as Owens' replacement when Owens himself is nursing a leg injury.

== Roster ==
2003 Sta. Lucia Realtors roster
Players

Pos.	#	POB	Name	Height	Weight	DOB (YYYY–MM–DD)	From
G	1	(Philippines)	Jason Webb	6 ft 0 in (1.83 m)			De La Salle
F	5	(Philippines)	Allan Yu	6 ft 2 in (1.88 m)			MLQU
G	8	(Philippines)	Paolo Mendoza	5 ft 11 in (1.80 m)			Philippines
G	9	(Philippines)	Francis Adriano	6 ft 0 in (1.83 m)			Far Eastern
G	10	(Philippines)	Chris Tan	6 ft 1 in (1.85 m)			De La Salle
F	11	(Philippines)	Gerard Francisco	6 ft 3 in (1.91 m)			UST
C	13	(Philippines)	Marlou Aquino	6 ft 9 in (2.06 m)			Adamson
G	15	(Philippines)	Paeng Santos	6 ft 2 in (1.88 m)			UE
F/C	16	(Philippines)	Dennis Espino	6 ft 6 in (1.98 m)			UST
C	18	(Philippines)	Wilmer Ong	6 ft 4 in (1.93 m)			USLS
G/F	19	(Philippines)	Kenneth Duremdes	6 ft 3 in (1.91 m)			Adamson
F	21	(Philippines)	Leo Bat-Og	6 ft 4 in (1.93 m)
G		(Philippines)	Jomar Tierra	6 ft 0 in (1.83 m)			UE
G	62	(Philippines)	Ercito Victolero	5 ft 11 in (1.80 m)			Mapúa
G		(United States)	Nate James (I)	6 ft 3 in (1.91 m)			Duke
G/F	24	(United States)	Damian Owens (I)	6 ft 4 in (1.93 m)			West Virginia
G		(United States)	Raymond Tutt (I)	6 ft 2 in (1.88 m)

Coaches
Head coach
- (Philippines) Alfrancis Chua
Assistant(s)
- (Philippines) Adonis Tierra
- (Philippines) Cholo Martin

Legend
- (DP) Unsigned draft pick
- (FA) Free agent
- (S) Suspended
- (I) Import
- Injured

== Game results ==
=== All-Filipino Cup ===
Date	Opponent	Score	Top scorer	Venue	Location
February 23	Alaska	82–91	Duremdes (26 pts)	Araneta Coliseum	Quezon City
March 1	Brgy.Ginebra	82–89			Baguio City
March 7	FedEx	81–71		Ynares Center	Antipolo City
March 12	Red Bull	83–92		Philsports Arena	Pasig
March 14	Talk 'N Text	71–72	Aquino (25 pts)	Philsports Arena	Pasig
March 23	Purefoods	68–59		Araneta Coliseum	Quezon City
March 28	Brgy.Ginebra	103–97		Araneta Coliseum	Quezon City
April 2	Shell	79–69	Duremdes (29 pts)	Philsports Arena	Pasig
April 6	Coca-Cola	84–82	Duremdes (23 pts)	Philsports Arena	Pasig
April 11	San Miguel	77–80 OT		Makati Coliseum	Makati City
April 16	Talk 'N Text	77–84		Philsports Arena	Pasig
April 23	Alaska	94–90	Duremdes (25 pts)	Philsports Arena	Pasig
April 27	Purefoods	75–71	Aquino (22 pts)	Araneta Coliseum	Quezon City
May 3	San Miguel	70–81			Puerto Princesa, Palawan
May 7	Red Bull	95–89		Philsports Arena	Pasig
May 11	Shell	73–78		Araneta Coliseum	Quezon City
May 18	FedEx	75–76		Araneta Coliseum	Quezon City
May 23	Coca-Cola	76–98		Makati Coliseum	Makati City

Win
Win via OT
loss
loss via OT
