= Francis Adriano =

Filipino basketball player

Personal information
- Born: September 24, 1975 (age 51) Pasig, Philippines
- Listed height: 6 ft 2 in (1.88 m)
- Listed weight: 170 lb (77 kg)

Career information
- College: PSBA; FEU (1997)
- PBA draft: 2001: 1st round, 6th overall pick
- Drafted by: Sta. Lucia Realtors
- Playing career: 1998–2014, 2019–2020
- Position: Shooting guard

Career history
- 1998–2000: Pasig Blue/Pasig-Rizal Pirates
- 2001–2005: Sta. Lucia Realtors
- 2005–2007: San Miguel Beermen
- 2007–2008: Red Bull Barako
- 2009–2010: Brunei Barracudas
- 2010–2011: Satria Muda Britama Indonesia
- 2012: AirAsia Philippine Patriots
- 2019–2020: Pasig Sta. Lucia Realtors

Career highlights
- 2× PBA champion (2001 Governors', 2005 Fiesta); UAAP champion (1997)

Francis Adriano (born September 24, 1975) is a Filipino former professional basketball player. Drafted 6th overall by Sta. Lucia in 2001, he started his pro career with the now-defunct Metropolitan Basketball Association. He also played in the Philippine Basketball Association, ASEAN Basketball League, and Maharlika Pilipinas Basketball League.

== College career ==
Adriano first played college basketball for PSBA in the NCRAA. He then transferred to the FEU Tamaraws in the UAAP for one season in 1997. He debuted with 15 points, three rebounds, two assists, and a steal in a win over the Adamson Soaring Falcons. Against the De La Salle Green Archers, he had 31 points, eight rebounds, three assists, and six steals. FEU made the finals that year where in Game One, he made go-ahead baskets for FEU to take the win. The Tamaraws then took Game 2 to win the UAAP championship.

== Professional career ==
=== Pasig Blue / Pasig-Rizal Pirates (1998–2000) ===
In 1998, Adriano was recruited by coach Joel Banal to play for the Pasig Pirates in the now-defunct Metropolitan Basketball Association (MBA). They reached the MBA semifinals five straight times. In 2001, he applied for the PBA draft.

=== Sta. Lucia Realtors (2001–2005) ===
Adriano joined the Sta. Lucia Realtors as the sixth overall pick in the 2001 draft. He was among four MBA veterans who were selected in the first round. In the Governors' Cup elimination round, he scored 12 points in an overtime win over the Alaska Aces. In the quarterfinals, he scored five straight points in the last 39 seconds of the game that sealed Sta. Lucia's entry into the semifinals. Sta. Lucia went on to win the title in that conference, making this his first championship.

In 2003, Sta. Lucia were eliminated in the semifinals of the 2003 All-Filipino Cup. In the Reinforced Conference, Adriano helped Sta. Lucia secure first place in their group in the elimination round with an 8–5 record.

Adriano's contract was renewed in 2004, but expired the following year, making him a free agent.

=== San Miguel Beermen (2005–2007) ===
Adriano then played for the San Miguel Beermen. They won the 2005 Fiesta Conference, with Adriano contributing with quality minutes off the bench.

=== Red Bull Barako (2007–2008) ===
In 2007, Adriano and Brandon Cablay were traded to Red Bull Barako for Larry Fonacier. His career high of 29 points came with Red Bull in Game Six of the 2007–08 PBA Philippine Cup semifinals during a 123–97 win against the Purefoods Tender Juicy Giants. Purefoods eventually eliminated them in Game 7. They were able to finish in third place for the conference by beating the Aces in the third-place game. He was released in 2008.

=== Brunei Barracudas (2009–2010) ===
In 2009, Adriano joined the Brunei Barracudas in the ASEAN Basketball League (ABL). Led by Filipino head coach Bong Ramos, Adriano joined Leo Avenido and Don Camaso as the team's Asian imports.

=== Satria Muda Britama Indonesia (2010–2011) ===
On September 28, 2010, Adriano teamed up with Camaso and Mario Wuysang at Satria Muda Britama Indonesia, Indonesia's ABL team for the 2010–11 season. He had 20 points and 14 rebounds in a win over the Philippine Patriots.

=== AirAsia Philippine Patriots (2012) ===
In 2012, Adriano joined the AirAsia Philippine Patriots. The Patriots lost in the semifinals to the Indonesia Warriors.

=== Pasig Sta. Lucia Realtors (2019–2020) ===
From 2014 to 2019, Adriano played in the charity league UNTV Cup and in various semi-professional leagues and exhibition games. Before the start of the 2019–20 MPBL season, it was announced that Adriano would be joining the Pasig Sta. Lucia Realtors in the Maharlika Pilipinas Basketball League.

== Personal life ==
Adriano has a daughter, Cheska, and a son, Francis II. His sister, Aurora "AA" Adriano, played for the Philippine women's national basketball team then became a player-coach for the women's national handball team.

== PBA career statistics ==
Legend
GP	Games played	MPG	Minutes per game
FG%	Field-goal percentage	3P%	3-point field-goal percentage	FT%	Free-throw percentage
RPG	Rebounds per game	APG	Assists per game	SPG	Steals per game
BPG	Blocks per game	PPG	Points per game	**Bold**	Career high

=== Season-by-season averages ===
Year	Team	GP	MPG	FG%	3P%	FT%	RPG	APG	SPG	BPG	PPG
2001	Sta. Lucia	32	18.3	.423	.271	**.673**	2.4	.8	.5	.0	6.3
2002	Sta. Lucia	15	10.0	**.528**	**.462**	.467	1.3	.3	.1	.0	3.4
2003	Sta. Lucia	**47**	**19.0**	.419	.253	.667	**3.0**	1.0	**.8**	.0	**6.9**
2004–05	Sta. Lucia	37	12.5	.388	.282	.605	1.8	1.0	.6	**.1**	3.7
2004–05	San Miguel	37	12.5	.388	.282	.605	1.8	1.0	.6	**.1**	3.7
2005–06	San Miguel	27	12.3	.506	.333	.235	2.3	.5	.3	.0	3.9
2006–07	Alaska	22	5.7	.292	.250	.538	.8	.2	.1	.0	1.6
2007–08	Red Bull	37	18.1	.408	.268	.542	3.0	**1.4**	.5	**.1**	6.5
Career		217	15.2	.435	.277	.569	2.4	.9	.5	.0	5.3
