= 2003 Shell Turbo Chargers season =

- Head coach: Perry Ronquillo
- Owner(s): Pilipinas Shell Petroleum Corp.

All-Filipino Cup results
- Record: 5–13 (27.8%)
- Place: N/A
- Playoff finish: N/A

Mabuhay Cup results
- Record: 2–2 (50%)
- Place: N/A
- Playoff finish: N/A

Reinforced Conference results
- Record: 3–10 (23.1%)
- Place: N/A
- Playoff finish: N/A

Shell Turbo Chargers seasons

The 2003 Shell Turbo Chargers season was the 19th season of the franchise in the Philippine Basketball Association (PBA).

== Occurrences ==
During halftime of Shell's second game of the season against Purefoods, the Turbo Chargers retire the number 14 jersey of their franchise player Benjie Paras, who owns the distinction of being the only rookie-MVP in PBA history.

Returning import Sedric Webber could only play four games in the Reinforced Conference where Shell scored two victories, he fractured his right ankle and watched helplessly on the sidelines when the Turbo Chargers absorbed their third setback against Talk 'N Text. Former Houston Rocket Tim Breaux replaces Webber in their next game against Barangay Ginebra in Calape, Bohol and he played only one game after Shell lost to the Gin Kings. Jamal Kendrick, a veteran of the Lebanon league, plane in for Shell's next game against San Miguel on October 1.

== Roster ==
2003 Shell Turbo Chargers roster
Players

Pos.	#	POB	Name	Height	Weight	DOB (YYYY–MM–DD)	From
F	3	(United States)	Chris Jackson	6 ft 4 in (1.93 m)			San Bernardino Valley
F	6	(Philippines)	Edwin Bacani	6 ft 3 in (1.91 m)			Far Eastern
G	7	(Philippines)	Rensy Bajar	5 ft 10 in (1.78 m)			San Beda
G/F	8	(Philippines)	Ronald Tubid	6 ft 1 in (1.85 m)			UE
G	9	(Philippines)	Chris Calaguio	6 ft 2 in (1.88 m)			Letran
F	11	(Philippines)	Eddie Laure	6 ft 3 in (1.91 m)			Adamson
G	12	(Philippines)	Porferio Marzan	6 ft 2 in (1.88 m)			Baguio
F	16	(Philippines)	Frederick Canlas	6 ft 7 in (2.01 m)			Saint Francis of Assisi
G/F	18	(Philippines)	Reinier Sison	6 ft 1 in (1.85 m)			Ateneo
F	19	(Philippines)	Adonis Santa Maria	6 ft 5 in (1.96 m)			De La Salle
F	32	(Philippines)	Mike Hrabak	6 ft 6 in (1.98 m)			Central Arizona
G	35	(United States)	Tony Dela Cruz	6 ft 4 in (1.93 m)			UC Irvine
G	50	(Philippines)	Dale Singson	6 ft 0 in (1.83 m)			UST
G/F	23	(United States)	Sedric Webber (I)	6 ft 4 in (1.93 m)			College of Charleston
F	15	(United States)	Tim Breaux (I)	6 ft 4 in (1.93 m)			Wyoming
F	19	(United States)	Jamal Kendrick (I)	6 ft 4 in (1.93 m)			Baylor

Coaches
Head coach
- (Philippines) Perry Ronquillo
Assistant(s)
- (Philippines) Joey Guanio
- (Philippines) Jonas Mendoza

Legend
- (DP) Unsigned draft pick
- (FA) Free agent
- (S) Suspended
- (I) Import
- Injured

== Game results ==
=== All-Filipino Cup ===
Date	Opponent	Score	Top scorer	Venue	Location
February 26	Talk 'N Text	77–74		Philsports Arena	Pasig
March 2	Purefoods	69–78		Araneta Coliseum	Quezon City
March 5	Coca-Cola	92–103	Hrabak (23 pts)	Philsports Arena	Pasig
March 9	Alaska	80–85		Araneta Coliseum	Quezon City
March 19	FedEx	92–98	Laure (27 pts)	Philsports Arena	Pasig
March 22	San Miguel	81–89			Dumaguete City
March 26	Talk 'N Text	92–104		Makati Coliseum	Makati City
April 2	Sta.Lucia	69–79		Philsports Arena	Pasig
April 6	Red Bull			Philsports Arena	Pasig
April 11	Purefoods	68–65		Makati Coliseum	Makati City
April 20	Brgy.Ginebra	71–76		Araneta Coliseum	Quezon City
April 25	FedEx	80–65	Singson (19 pts)	Philsports Arena	Pasig
April 30	Coca-Cola	81–95		Makati Coliseum	Makati City
May 4	Alaska	89–83		Araneta Coliseum	Quezon City
May 11	Sta.Lucia	78–73		Araneta Coliseum	Quezon City
May 16	San Miguel	58–76		Ynares Center	Antipolo City
May 21	Red Bull	104–108	Dela Cruz (32 pts)	Philsports Arena	Pasig
May 25	Brgy.Ginebra	64–69		Araneta Coliseum	Quezon City

Win
Win via OT
loss
loss via OT
