= Mike Hrabak =

Filipino-Turkish basketball player

Personal information
- Born: August 27, 1979 (age 47) Angeles City, Philippines
- Listed height: 6 ft 7 in (2.01 m)
- Listed weight: 215 lb (98 kg)

Career information
- College: Central Arizona College
- PBA draft: 2001: 1st round, 2nd overall pick
- Drafted by: Shell Turbo Chargers
- Playing career: 2001–2010
- Position: Small forward / power forward

Career history
- 2001–2003: Shell Turbo Chargers
- 2004–2005: Purefoods TJ Hotdogs
- 2005–2009: Barako Bull Energy Boosters
- 2009–2010: Rain or Shine Elasto Painters

Career highlights
- PBA champion (2005-06 Fiesta); PBA Comeback Player of the Year (2008)

Michael Allen Pasana Hrabak (born August 27, 1979) is a Filipino-Turkish former professional basketball player. He last played for the Rain or Shine Elasto Painters of the Philippine Basketball Association (PBA). He was drafted second overall by Shell in 2001.

== Player Profile ==
A 6ft 7in forward, Hrabak is an accomplished three point shooter, interior defender and versatile scorer. He once scored 17 points in just one quarter in a game against the Talk 'N Text Phone Pals. In the 2007-08 PBA season, he led the league in three point field goal percentage. In 2009, he was again traded to his fourth team, Rain or Shine.

== PBA career statistics ==
Legend
| GP | Games played | MPG | Minutes per game |
| FG% | Field-goal percentage | 3P% | 3-point field-goal percentage | FT% | Free-throw percentage |
| RPG | Rebounds per game | APG | Assists per game | SPG | Steals per game |
| BPG | Blocks per game | PPG | Points per game | **Bold** | Career high |

=== Season-by-season averages ===
| Year | Team | GP | MPG | FG% | 3P% | FT% | RPG | APG | SPG | BPG | PPG |
|---|---|---|---|---|---|---|---|---|---|---|---|
| 2001 | Shell | **51** | 25.1 | .423 | .354 | **.827** | 4.1 | .9 | .1 | .7 | **8.7** |
| 2002 | Shell | 30 | 20.6 | .427 | .385 | .571 | 3.3 | 1.0 | .3 | .8 | 6.5 |
| 2003 | Shell | 31 | 23.3 | .410 | .327 | .727 | 4.2 | .8 | .3 | .7 | 6.8 |
| 2004–05 | Purefoods | 37 | 17.8 | .458 | .364 | .667 | 3.5 | **1.5** | **.5** | .5 | 5.1 |
| 2005–06 | Red Bull | 22 | 10.1 | .340 | .429 | .000 | 1.8 | .4 | .1 | .6 | 1.9 |
| 2006–07 | Red Bull | 26 | 17.7 | **.496** | .391 | .818 | 3.2 | .8 | .1 | .7 | 6.3 |
| 2007–08 | Red Bull | 48 | **27.4** | .437 | .429 | .700 | **5.3** | 1.3 | .3 | **1.3** | 7.8 |
| 2008–09 | Red Bull / Barako Bull | 33 | 19.1 | .327 | .366 | .667 | 2.9 | .6 | .2 | 1.1 | 3.0 |
| 2009–10 | Rain or Shine | 45 | 19.8 | .455 | **.455** | .538 | 2.2 | .6 | .2 | .8 | 4.9 |
| Career | | 323 | 21.0 | .428 | .401 | .713 | 3.5 | .9 | .2 | .8 | 6.0 |
