= 2001 Talk 'N Text Phone Pals season =

- Head coach: Louie Alas
- General manager: Frankie Lim
- Owners: Pilipino Telephone Corporation, Smart Communications (an MVP Group subsidiary)

All-Filipino results
- Record: 7–9 (43.8%)
- Place: 8th seed
- Playoff finish: Quarterfinals (lost to Shell in two games)

Commissioner's Cup results
- Record: 3–6 (33.3%)
- Place: N/A
- Playoff finish: N/A

Governors' Cup results
- Record: 8–10 (44.4%)
- Place: 5th seed
- Playoff finish: Semifinals

Talk 'N Text Phone Pals seasons

The 2001 Mobiline Phone Pals season was the 12th season of the franchise in the Philippine Basketball Association (PBA). The team became known as Talk 'N Text Phone Pals beginning the Governor's Cup.

== Transactions ==
Players Added

Via Draft

- Gilbert Demape
- Norman Gonzales
- June Longalong
Players Lost

Via Free Agency

- Jose Francisco
- Al Solis (To Batang Red Bull Thunder)
- Eric Reyes (To Alaska Aces)

== Occurrences ==
Asi Taulava return to the team on June 22 upon being cleared to play again in the PBA and along with their returning import Todd Bernard, who came in to replace Jerod Ward.

Mobiline was renamed Talk 'N Text Phone Pals starting the Governor's Cup, when Smart Communications absorbed the operations of Pilipino Telephone Corporation.

== Roster ==
2001 Talk 'N Text Phone Pals roster
Players

Pos.	#	POB	Name	Height	Weight	DOB (YYYY–MM–DD)	From
G	1	(Philippines)	Bong Ravena	6 ft 1 in (1.85 m)			UE
C	5	(Philippines)	Gido Babilonia	6 ft 5 in (1.96 m)			UST
G	6	(Philippines)	Gilbert Demape	6 ft 1 in (1.85 m)			Cebu Tech
G	9	(Philippines)	Gherome Ejercito	6 ft 2 in (1.88 m)			Adamson
G	17	(Philippines)	Patrick Fran	6 ft 0 in (1.83 m)			UST
F	20	(Philippines)	Don Camaso	6 ft 6 in (1.98 m)			Metro Manila Colleges
F	23	(Philippines)	June Longalong	6 ft 3 in (1.91 m)			UPHSD
F	28	(Philippines)	Norman Gonzales	6 ft 4 in (1.93 m)			San Beda
F	29	(Philippines)	Josel Angeles	6 ft 2 in (1.88 m)			Lyceum
F	33	(Philippines)	Victor Pablo	6 ft 4 in (1.93 m)			Far Eastern
F/C	44	(Philippines)	Jerry Codinera	6 ft 5 in (1.96 m)			UE
C	55	(Tonga)	Asi Taulava	6 ft 9 in (2.06 m)			BYU–Hawaii
F/C	81	(Philippines)	Gabby Cui	6 ft 4 in (1.93 m)			Ateneo
F		(United States)	Jerod Ward (C)	6 ft 5 in (1.96 m)			Michigan
F		(United States)	Todd Bernard (C/G)	6 ft 3 in (1.91 m)			Fresno State
G		(United States)	Brandon Williams (G)	6 ft 3 in (1.91 m)			Davidson

Coaches
Head coach
- (Philippines) Louie Alas
Assistant(s)
- (Philippines) Aric del Rosario
- (Philippines) Ariel Vanguardia
- (Philippines) Bong Go

Legend
- (DP) Unsigned draft pick
- (FA) Free agent
- (S) Suspended
- (C) Commissioner's Cup Import
- (G) Governor's Cup Import
- Injured

^{Team Manager: Frankie Lim}

== Eliminations (Won games) ==
DATE	OPPONENT	SCORE	VENUE (Location)
February 7	Pop Cola	79–72	Philsports Arena
February 24	San Miguel	83–71	San Fernando, Pampanga
March 11	Purefoods	76–73	Araneta Coliseum
March 16	Tanduay	85–76	Araneta Coliseum
March 18	Sta.Lucia	57–53	Ynares Center
April 1	Shell	77–54	Araneta Coliseum
June 6	Brgy.Ginebra	93–87	Philsports Arena
June 17	Shell	84–71	Araneta Coliseum
July 6	Tanduay	94–89 *OT	Ynares Canter
September 9	Shell	92–90	Araneta Coliseum
September 16	Purefoods	99–91	Cuneta Astrodome
September 21	Alaska	87–84	Araneta Coliseum
September 26	San Miguel	88–83	Philsports Arena
October 7	Sta.Lucia	81–80	Philsports Arena
October 12	Brgy.Ginebra	81–78	Cuneta Astrodome
October 19	Tanduay	86–76	Cuneta Astrodome

All-Filipino Cup Commissioner's Cup Governor's Cup
