= 2004–05 Sta. Lucia Realtors season =

- Head coach: Alfrancis Chua
- Owner: Sta. Lucia Realty and Development Corporation

Fiesta Conference (Transition) results
- Record: 8–11 (42.1%)
- Place: 7th
- Playoff finish: Wildcard

Philippine Cup results
- Record: 6–14 (30%)
- Place: 8th
- Playoff finish: Wildcard

Fiesta Conference results
- Record: 10–10 (50%)
- Place: 7th
- Playoff finish: Wildcard

Sta. Lucia Realtors seasons

The 2004–2005 Sta. Lucia Realtors season was the 12th season of the franchise in the Philippine Basketball Association (PBA).

== Draft picks ==
Round	Pick	Player	Nationality	College
1	8	Nelbert Omolon	Philippines	PCU
2	13	Kim Valenzuela	United States	Cuyamaca
2	17	Ronald Cuan	Philippines	La Salle

== Roster ==
2004–05 Sta. Lucia Realtors roster
Players

Pos.	#	POB	Name	Height	Weight	DOB (YYYY–MM–DD)	From
G	1	(Philippines)	Ronald Cuan	5 ft 11 in (1.80 m)			De La Salle
G	2	(Philippines)	Joseph Gumatay	5 ft 10 in (1.78 m)			Philippines
F	3	(Philippines)	Nelbert Omolon	6 ft 4 in (1.93 m)			Philippine Christian
F	6	(Philippines)	Noli Locsin	6 ft 3 in (1.91 m)			De La Salle
G	8	(Philippines)	Paolo Mendoza	5 ft 11 in (1.80 m)			Philippines
G	10	(Philippines)	Boyet Fernandez	5 ft 8 in (1.73 m)			San Agustin
F	11	(Philippines)	Gerard Francisco	6 ft 3 in (1.91 m)			UST
C	13	(Philippines)	Marlou Aquino	6 ft 9 in (2.06 m)			Adamson
G	15	(Philippines)	Paeng Santos	6 ft 2 in (1.88 m)			UE
F/C	16	(Philippines)	Dennis Espino (C)	6 ft 6 in (1.98 m)			UST
F	17	(Philippines)	Chester Tolomia	6 ft 2 in (1.88 m)			UPHSD
C	18	(Philippines)	Wilmer Ong	6 ft 4 in (1.93 m)			USLS
G/F	19	(Philippines)	Kenneth Duremdes	6 ft 3 in (1.91 m)			Adamson
F	24	(Philippines)	Ricky Calimag	6 ft 3 in (1.91 m)			San Beda
F	28	(Philippines)	Norman Gonzales	6 ft 4 in (1.93 m)			San Beda
C	34	(Philippines)	Oliver Agapito	6 ft 6 in (1.98 m)			St. Benilde
G	45	(Philippines)	Gilbert Demape	6 ft 1 in (1.85 m)			Cebu Tech
G	62	(Philippines)	Ercito Victolero	5 ft 11 in (1.80 m)			Mapúa

Coaches
Head coach
- (Philippines) Alfrancis Chua
Assistant(s)
- (Philippines) Boyet Fernandez
- (Philippines) Adonis Tierra
- (Philippines) Cholo Martin

Legend
- (DP) Unsigned draft pick
- (FA) Free agent
- (S) Suspended
- Injured

== Philippine Cup ==
=== Game log ===
2005 PBA Philippine Cup game log
October

Game	Date	Opponent	Score	High points	High rebounds	High assists	Location Attendance	Record
1	October 7	San Miguel	73–79				Zamboanga City	0–1
2	October 10	Brgy.Ginebra	84–88	Espino (22)			Araneta Coliseum	0–2
3	October 15	Shell	78–84	Duremdes (18) Espino (18)			Philsports Arena	0–3
4	October 22	Purefoods	87–89	Duremdes (37)			Philsports Arena	0–4
5	October 26	Red Bull	118–124 (3OT)				Bacolod	0–5

November

Game	Date	Opponent	Score	High points	High rebounds	High assists	Location Attendance	Record
6	November 3	Alaska					Araneta Coliseum	0–6
7	November 7	Coca Cola	86–69				Araneta Coliseum	1–6
8	November 12	FedEx	124-118	Mendoza (35)			Cuneta Astrodome	2–6
9	November 16	Brgy.Ginebra	79–85				Cavite City	2–7
10	November 19	San Miguel	74–95					2–8
11	November 24	Coca Cola	98–92	Duremdes (24)	Espino (8)	Espino (6)	Araneta Coliseum	3–8
12	November 30	Talk 'N Text	104–102	Duremdes (34) Aquino (29)			Puerto Princesa	4–8

December

Game	Date	Opponent	Score	High points	High rebounds	High assists	Location Attendance	Record
13	December 5	Shell	83–84	Aquino (23)			Araneta Coliseum	4–9
14	December 10	Purefoods	91–89				Araneta Coliseum	5–9
15	December 15	FedEx	104–114				Araneta Coliseum	5–10
16	December 19	Talk 'N Text	83–102	Espino (23)			Makati Coliseum	5–11
17	December 22	Red Bull	105–84	Duremdes (27)			Philsports Arena	6–11

January

Game	Date	Opponent	Score	High points	High rebounds	High assists	Location Attendance	Record
18	January 5	Alaska	95–105	Duremdes (29)			Philsports Arena	6–12

2004–05 schedule

== Transactions ==
=== Additions ===
Player	Signed	Former team
Norman Gonzales	2004 Fiesta	Talk 'N Text
Noli Locsin	2004 Fiesta	Talk 'N Text
Ogie Gumatay	2004–05 Philippine Cup	
Boyet Fernandez	2004–05 Philippine Cup	Purefoods
Ricky Calimag	2005 Fiesta	
Oliver Agapito	2005 Fiesta	Red Bull Barako
Gilbert Demape	2005 Fiesta	Purefoods TJ Hotdogs
Chester Tolomia	2005 Fiesta	

=== Subtractions ===
Player	Signed	New team
Chris Tan		
Francis Adriano	2005 Fiesta	San Miguel Beermen

== Recruited imports ==
Tournament	Name	#	Height	From	GP
2004 PBA Fiesta Conference	Lamayn Wilson		6 ft 8 in (2.03 m)	Troy State	3
2004 PBA Fiesta Conference	Derrick Brown	32	6 ft 3 in (1.91 m)	Providence College	16
2005 PBA Fiesta Conference	Richard Jeter		6 ft 6 in (1.98 m)	Atlanta Metro	1
2005 PBA Fiesta Conference	Raheim Brown	23	6 ft 10 in (2.08 m)	Florida Atlantic	5
2005 PBA Fiesta Conference	Ryan Fletcher	42	6 ft 7 in (2.01 m)	University of Cincinnati	14

^{GP – Games played}
