= Norman Gonzales =

Filipino basketball player

Personal information
- Born: May 21, 1976 (age 50) Magalang, Pampanga, Philippines
- Listed height: 6 ft 4 in (1.93 m)
- Listed weight: 200 lb (91 kg)

Career information
- College: San Beda
- PBA draft: 2001: 1st round, 7th overall pick
- Drafted by: Mobiline Phone Pals
- Playing career: 1998–2020
- Position: Small forward / power forward

Career history
- 1998: Pampanga Dragons
- 1999–2000: Cagayan de Oro Amigos
- 2001–2003: Talk 'N Text Phone Pals
- 2004–2009: Sta. Lucia Realtors
- 2009–2011: Powerade Tigers
- 2013: San Miguel Beermen
- 2013: Saigon Heat
- 2019–2020: SocSarGen / Sarangani Marlins

Career highlights
- 2x PBA champion (2003 All-Filipino, 2007–08 Philippine)

Norman P. Gonzales (born May 21, 1976) is a Filipino former professional basketball player. He was drafted seventh overall by Mobiline in the 2001 PBA Draft.

== Professional career ==
Gonzales is among the league’s toughest sixth man since he entered the league in 2001. He was known for producing big points, sometimes double-double during his amateur days and while he was playing in the defunct MBA, a regional-based professional league in the Philippines when he played in the two MBA teams, the Pampanga Dragons (he was part of the championship team) and the Cagayan de Oro Amigos. Known also as a good defensive stopper inside and outside, Gonzales spent his first two years with Talk 'N Text. In 2003, he was suspended for failing a random drug test, and along with 5 other players filed a lawsuit with the league attempting to regain playing status. He later signed up as a free agent with Sta. Lucia. Gonzales proved his innocence and continuously improved his game especially when Sta. Lucia team governor Buddy Encarnado gave him another chance to redeem his sinking career in 2004.

=== Coca-Cola Tigers ===
On August 27, 2009, he was signed by the Coca-Cola Tigers as a free agent where he became one of their reliable role players.

=== Rain or Shine Elasto Painters ===
He along with J.R. Quiñahan and two future draft picks were traded to the Rain or Shine Elasto Painters for Doug Kramer and Josh Vanlandingham. However, he was not given a contract and was released days after.

=== Saigon Heat ===
After a short stint with the San Miguel Beermen at the beginning of the 2013 ABL season, Gonzales joined the Saigon Heat with only a handful of games left in the same season.

=== Blackwater Sports ===
He was picked up by Blackwater Sports in 2014 PBA Expansion Draft.

=== National team ===
Gonzales represented the national team in the 2005 Southeast Asian Games, where the team won gold.

== PBA career statistics ==
Legend
GP	Games played	MPG	Minutes per game
FG%	Field-goal percentage	3P%	3-point field-goal percentage	FT%	Free-throw percentage
RPG	Rebounds per game	APG	Assists per game	SPG	Steals per game
BPG	Blocks per game	PPG	Points per game	**Bold**	Career high

=== Season-by-season averages ===
Year	Team	GP	MPG	FG%	3P%	FT%	RPG	APG	SPG	BPG	PPG
2001	Mobiline / Talk 'N Text	34	17.2	.449	–	.684	3.2	.4	.4	.2	3.6
2002	Talk 'N Text	18	9.7	**.468**	.200	.750	1.6	.3	.2	.1	3.2
2003	Talk 'N Text	14	**18.4**	.279	.303	.654	3.9	.4	.4	**.3**	5.4
2004–05	Sta. Lucia	49	14.5	.382	.261	.650	4.2	.4	.4	.2	2.9
2005–06	Sta. Lucia	27	16.9	.424	.362	.568	4.5	.4	.3	**.3**	5.7
2006–07	Sta. Lucia	44	15.5	.400	.330	.754	3.5	.3	.3	.2	5.7
2007–08	Sta. Lucia	**50**	10.9	.372	.278	.780	1.9	.3	.5	.0	3.5
2008–09	Sta. Lucia	44	17.6	.427	.355	**.803**	4.2	.4	**.6**	.1	**6.6**
2009–10	Coca-Cola	36	15.7	.461	.356	.658	3.8	**.6**	**.6**	.2	6.4
2010–11	Powerade	28	16.6	.405	**.405**	.737	**4.6**	**.6**	.1	.1	5.2
Career		344	15.2	.408	.335	.709	3.6	.4	.4	.2	4.8
