= Richard del Rosario =

Filipino basketball player (born 1970)

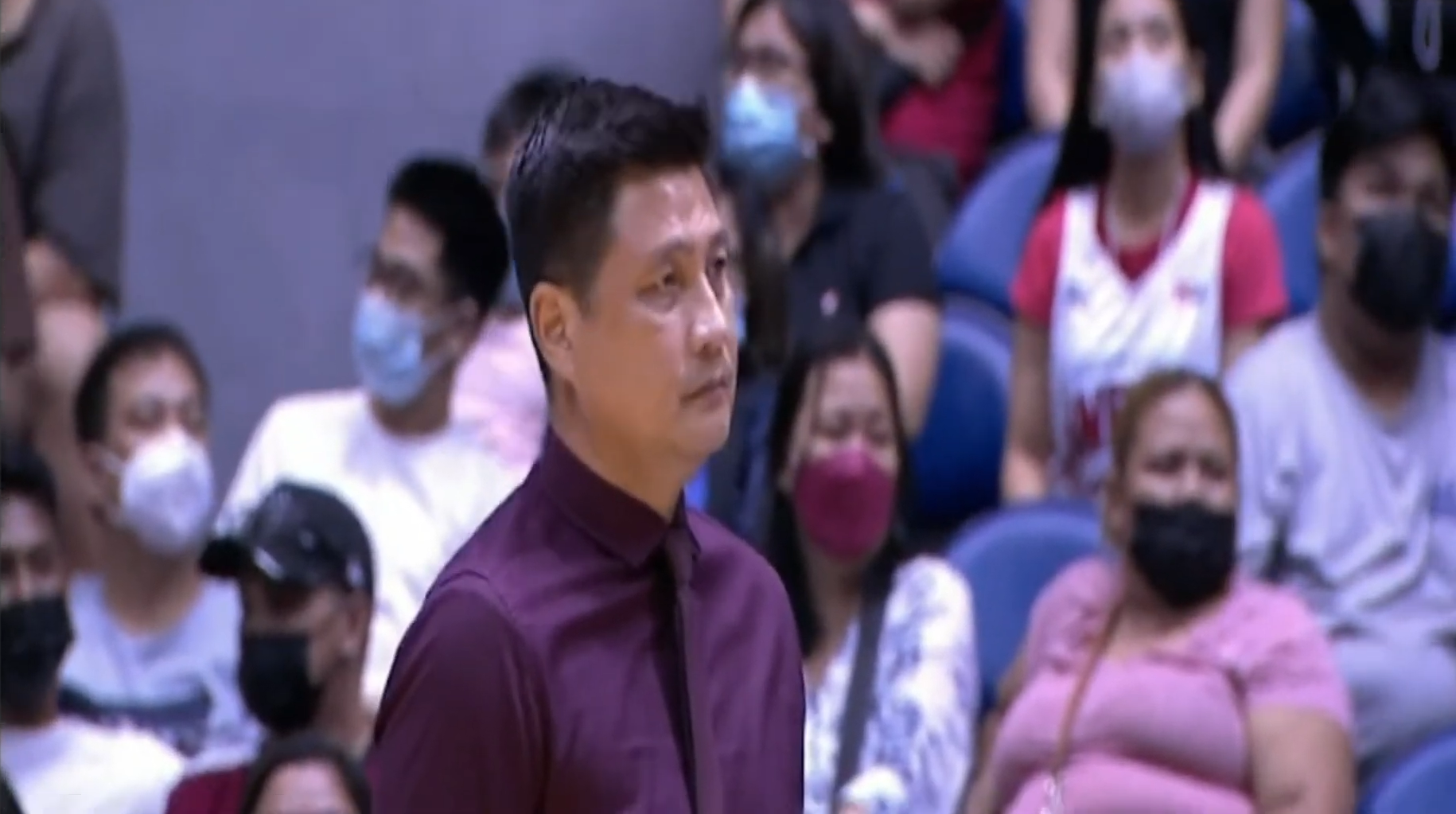

Barangay Ginebra San Miguel
- Title: Assistant coach
- League: PBA

Personal information
- Born: August 25, 1970 (age 56) Philippines
- Listed height: 6 ft 5 in (1.96 m)
- Listed weight: 215 lb (98 kg)

Career information
- College: De La Salle
- PBA draft: 1996: 2nd round, 9th overall pick
- Drafted by: Purefoods Tender Juicy Hotdogs
- Playing career: 1996–2004
- Position: Power forward / center
- Coaching career: 2005–present

Career history

Playing
- 1996–1997: Mobiline Phone Pals
- 1998–2002: Sta. Lucia Realtors
- 2003: Alaska Aces

Coaching
- 2005–2008: Benilde (assistant)
- 2008–2010: Rain or Shine Elasto Painters (assistant)
- 2009–2013: Benilde
- 2010–2015: B-Meg Derby Ace Llamados/B-Meg Llamados/San Mig Coffee Mixers/San Mig Super Coffee Mixers/Star Hotshots (assistant)
- 2015–present: Barangay Ginebra San Miguel (assistant)
- 2024–present: Perpetual (assistant)

Career highlights
- As player: PBA champion (2001 Governors'); 2× UAAP champion (1989, 1990); As assistant coach: 13× PBA champion (2012 Commissioner's, 2013 Governors', 2013–14 Philippine, 2014 Commissioner's, 2014 Governors', 2016 Governors', 2017 Governors', 2018 Commissioner's, 2019 Governors', 2020 Philippine, 2021 Governors', 2022–23 Commissioner's, 2026 Commissioner's); Grand Slam champion (2013–14)
Medals
Men's basketball
Assistant coach for Philippines
Southeast Asian Games
Gold medal – first place	2019 Manila	Team
Asian Games
Gold medal – first place	2022 Hangzhou	Team

Richard del Rosario (born August 25, 1970) is a Filipino former basketball player who is currently serving as an assistant coach for both the Barangay Ginebra San Miguel of the Philippine Basketball Association (PBA) and the Perpetual Altas in the NCAA. He was drafted in 2nd round by Purefoods Tender Juicy Hotdogs, traded to Mobiline Phone Pals, and played also for Sta. Lucia Realtors and Alaska Aces.

== Playing career ==
=== Early career ===
Del Rosario played for De La Salle Green Archers in the UAAP. His notable teammates were PBA future stars Jun Limpot, Dindo Pumaren, future Benilde coach Dong Vergeire, Joey Santamaria, Terrafirma Dyip coach Johnedel Cardel, Tim Cone's brother-in-law Eddie Viaplana and future PBA Coach of the Year Perry Ronquillo.

=== Professional career ===
He was selected by Purefoods Tender Juicy Hotdogs then-coached by Chot Reyes, but was traded to the Mobiline Phone Pals. He was a part of 2001 Sta. Lucia team that defeated San Miguel Beermen in the Finals. He also played for Alaska Aces when he was traded in 2003, but only for four games.

In 2003, his career was ended by a car accident.

== Coaching career ==
Del Rosario served as an assistant coach for Caloy Garcia and Gee Abanilla for Benilde Blazers, and later served as the team's coach. He also served as an assistant coach for Rain or Shine Elasto Painters, and Star Hotshots, and Barangay Ginebra San Miguel. In 2024, at the appointment of his Ginebra coaching staff colleague Olsen Racela as Perpetual head coach, he was chosen with Scottie Thompson to be an assistant coach of the team.

== Managerial career ==
After the appointment of Tim Cone as head coach of Philippine basketball team, Del Rosario was appointed as its new manager.

== Coaching record ==
=== Collegiate record ===
Season	Team	GP	W	L	PCT	Finish	PG	PW	PL	PCT	Results
2009	CSB	18	6	12	.333	8th	–	–	–	–	Eliminated
2010	CSB	18	5	11	.313	7th	–	–	–	–	Eliminated
2011	CSB	18	6	12	.333	8th	–	–	–	–	Eliminated
2012	CSB	18	5	13	.278	9th	–	–	–	–	Eliminated
Totals		70	22	48	.314		0	0	0	.000	0 championships

== Commentary career ==
Del Rosario has worked for the ABC, Solar Sports, and One Sports coverages of the PBA.

== Personal life ==
Del Rosario married Yvonne Ruiz, who like him, studied at La Salle. They have two sons and one daughter. His elder son Paolo is a sports commentator as well, working for One Sports.

Preceded by Gee Abanilla	Benidle/CSB Blazers head coach 2009–2012	Succeeded by Gabby Velasco
