= 2001 Purefoods Tender Juicy Hotdogs season =

- Head coach: Eric Altamirano
- General manager: Rene Pardo
- Owner: San Miguel Purefoods

All-Filipino Cup results
- Record: 8–8 (50%)
- Place: 4th seed
- Playoff finish: QF (lost to Brgy.Ginebra)

Commissioner's Cup results
- Record: 9–7 (56.3%)
- Place: 2nd seed
- Playoff finish: Semis (lost to Red Bull)

Governors Cup results
- Record: 5–8 (38.5%)
- Place: N/A
- Playoff finish: N/A

Purefoods Tender Juicy Hotdogs seasons

The 2001 Purefoods Tender Juicy Hotdogs season was the 14th season of the franchise in the Philippine Basketball Association (PBA). This is their first season under new management, San Miguel Corporation

== Transactions ==
Players Added

Via Draft

- Roger Yap
- Paul Guerrero
- Dino Manuel (Originally pick by Shell Turbo Chargers)

Via Free Agency

- Mark Victoria (From Pop Cola)
- Ronnie Magsanoc
- Jolly Escobar
Players Lost

Via Free Agency

- Jessie Cabanayan
- Braulio Lim

Via Trade

- Dindo Pumaren (Shipped to Tanduay Rhum Masters in favor of a future draft pick)

== Occurrences ==
Coach Eric Altamirano returns to the Purefoods bench as their head coach at the beginning of the season. Altamirano brings along Ryan Gregorio as his assistant coach. He replaces Derrick Pumaren, who decided to move to another team and will handle the coaching chores for Tanduay Rhum Masters.

== Roster ==
2001 Purefoods Tender Juicy Hotdogs roster
Players

Pos.	#	POB	Name	Height	Weight	DOB (YYYY–MM–DD)	From
F	2	(Philippines)	Richard Yee	6 ft 4 in (1.93 m)			UST
G	5	(Philippines)	Ronnie Magsanoc	5 ft 9 in (1.75 m)			Philippines
G	6	(Philippines)	Boyet Fernandez	5 ft 8 in (1.73 m)			San Agustin
F	7	(Philippines)	Rey Evangelista	6 ft 3 in (1.91 m)			UST
C	11	(Philippines)	Edward Joseph Feihl	7 ft 1 in (2.16 m)			Adamson
G	13	(Philippines)	Roger Yap	6 ft 1 in (1.85 m)			USJ–R
F	16	(Philippines)	Alvin Patrimonio	6 ft 3 in (1.91 m)			Mapúa
F	18	(Philippines)	Paul Guerrero	6 ft 4 in (1.93 m)			Letran
F	19	(Philippines)	Mark Stevens Victoria	6 ft 3 in (1.91 m)			Far Eastern
F/C		(Philippines)	Dino Manuel	6 ft 5 in (1.96 m)			San Beda
G	24	(Philippines)	Rommel Daep	6 ft 2 in (1.88 m)			San Sebastian
F	34	(Philippines)	Jolly Escobar	6 ft 5 in (1.96 m)			UE
G	40	(United States)	Noy Castillo	6 ft 0 in (1.83 m)			The Citadel
C	52	(United States)	Andy Seigle	6 ft 9 in (2.06 m)			LSU New Orleans
F/C	15	(United States)	David Wood (C)	6 ft 7 in (2.01 m)			Nevada
G/F	32	(United States)	Derrick Brown (G)	6 ft 3 in (1.91 m)			Providence
G	10	(Philippines)	Dindo Pumaren (M)	5 ft 9 in (1.75 m)			De La Salle

Coaches
Head coach
- (Philippines) Eric Altamirano
Assistant(s)
- (Philippines) Ryan Gregorio

Legend
- (DP) Unsigned draft pick
- (FA) Free agent
- (S) Suspended
- (C) Commissioner's Cup import
  - (G) Governor's Cup import
  - (M) Moved to Tanduay
- Injured

^{Team Manager: Rene Pardo}

== Eliminations (Won games) ==
DATE	OPPONENT	SCORE	VENUE (Location)
January 31	Tanduay	75-66	Philsports Arena
February 4	Alaska	95-77	Araneta Coliseum
February 21	Sta.Lucia	77-63	Philsports Arena
March 16	Sta.Lucia	74-66	Araneta Coliseum
March 21	Red Bull	86-79	Philsports Arena
March 25	San Miguel	79-71	Araneta Coliseum
March 30	Brgy.Ginebra	85-78	Philsports Arena
April 6	Shell	81-72	Araneta Coliseum
June 15	Sta.Lucia	65-54	Philsports Arena
June 22	Pop Cola	89-82	Philsports Arena
June 27	Shell	97-79	Philsports Arena
June 30	Mobiline	94-89 *OT	Cuneta Astrodome
July 4	Alaska	85-76	Philsports Arena
July 18	Red Bull	85-75	Philsports Arena
September 8	Alaska		Ynares Center
September 21	Brgy.Ginebra	106-102	Araneta Coliseum
October 3	Red Bull	92-82	Araneta Coliseum
October 31	Sta.Lucia	127-118 *2OT	Philsports Arena
November 14	Red Bull	123-112	Philsports Arena

All-Filipino Cup Commissioner's Cup Governor's Cup
