= 2001 Pop Cola Panthers season =

- Head coach: Chot Reyes
- General manager: Elmer Yanga

All-Filipino Cup results
- Record: 11–10 (52.4%)
- Place: 3rd seed
- Playoff finish: Semis (lost to SMB)

Commissioner's Cup results
- Record: 3–7 (30%)
- Place: N/A
- Playoff finish: N/A

Governors' Cup results
- Record: 9–10 (47.4%)
- Place: 3rd seed
- Playoff finish: Semifinals

Pop Cola Panthers seasons

The 2001 Pop Cola Panthers season was the 12th and final season of the franchise in the Philippine Basketball Association (PBA).

== Transactions ==
Players Added

Via Draft

- Renato Morano
- Ramon Jose

Via Free Agency

- Allan Gamboa (Pop Cola's pick last year, elevated to the roster spot)
- Cris Bolado (From Red Bull)

Via Trade

- Johnny Abarrientos (From Alaska Aces)
- Poch Juinio (From Alaska Aces)
- Pido Jarencio (From Tanduay Rhum Masters)
- Rudy Hatfield (From Tanduay Rhum Masters)
Players Lost

Via Free Agency

- Henry Fernandez (To San Miguel Beermen)
- Mark Victoria (To Purefoods TJ Hotdogs)

Via Trade

- Ali Peek (To Alaska Aces)
- Jon Ordonio (To Alaska Aces)
- Wynne Arboleda (To Tanduay Rhum Masters)
- Noli Locsin (To Tanduay Rhum Masters)

== Occurrences ==
Pop Cola played their first three games in the Governor's Cup under the brand name "Swift", which the franchise last used back in 1994, known as Swift Panthers, they scored their first win over Red Bull, then revert to Pop Cola in their fourth game.

The Pop Cola ballclub was disbanded the following season after the PBA franchise was sold by RFM Corporation to Coca-Cola Bottlers Philippines, Inc. (CCBPI), in connection with the sale of Cosmos Bottling Corporation to CCBPI.

== Roster ==
2001 Pop Cola Panthers roster
Players

Pos.	#	POB	Name	Height	Weight	DOB (YYYY–MM–DD)	From
G	6	(Philippines)	Jojo Lastimosa	6 ft 0 in (1.83 m)			USJ–R
G	10	(Philippines)	Renato Morano	6 ft 0 in (1.83 m)			San Beda
F	11	(Philippines)	Nelson Asaytono	6 ft 3 in (1.91 m)			Manila
F	12	(Philippines)	Allan Gamboa	6 ft 5 in (1.96 m)			Philippines
G	14	(Philippines)	Johnny Abarrientos	5 ft 8 in (1.73 m)			Far Eastern
F	16	(Philippines)	Estong Ballesteros	6 ft 3 in (1.91 m)			UST
G	22	(Philippines)	Mon Jose	6 ft 0 in (1.83 m)			De La Salle
C	24	(Philippines)	Cris Bolado	6 ft 7 in (2.01 m)			National-U
G	25	(Philippines)	Pido Jarencio	5 ft 10 in (1.78 m)			UST
C	32	(Philippines)	Poch Juinio	6 ft 5 in (1.96 m)			Philippines
G	34	(United States)	William Antonio	6 ft 3 in (1.91 m)			Chaminade
F	99	(United States)	Rudy Hatfield	6 ft 3 in (1.91 m)			UM–Dearborn
F	33	(United States)	Jason Sasser (C)	6 ft 4 in (1.93 m)			Texas Tech
G		(United States)	Jamie Watson (C)	6 ft 3 in (1.91 m)			South Carolina
SF	26	(United States)	Rosell Ellis (G)	6 ft 3 in (1.91 m)			McNeese State

Coaches
Head coach
- (Philippines) Chot Reyes
Assistant(s)
- (Philippines) Hector Calma
- (Philippines) Binky Favis
- (Philippines) Biboy Ravanes
- (Philippines) Mike Reyes

Legend
- (DP) Unsigned draft pick
- (FA) Free agent
- (S) Suspended
- (C) Commissioner's Cup import
- (G) Governor's Cup import
- Injured

^{Team Manager: Elmer Yanga}

== Eliminations (Won games) ==
DATE	OPPONENT	SCORE	VENUE (Location)
February 2	Red Bull	88–77	Philsports Arena
February 16	Purefoods	96–92	Philsports Arena
February 21	Shell	75–67	Philsports Arena
March 10	Sta.Lucia	72–69	Laoag City
March 14	Brgy.Ginebra	100–84	Philsports Arena
March 25	Tanduay	82–75	Araneta Coliseum
April 1	Alaska	93–90	Araneta Coliseum
April 6	Brgy.Ginebra	92–90	Araneta Coliseum
June 13	Shell	75-68	Ynares Center
June 16	Tanduay	99–88	Ormoc City
June 27	Mobiline	82–79	Philsports Arena
September 19	Red Bull	83–80	Araneta Coliseum
September 22	San Miguel	96–95 *OT	Ynares Center
September 28	Tanduay	94–76	Araneta Coliseum
October 3	Talk 'N Text	80–74	Araneta Coliseum
October 21	Purefoods	85–84	Araneta Coliseum
October 28	Brgy.Ginebra	83–71	Araneta Coliseum
November 11	Talk 'N Text	84–62	Araneta Coliseum

All-Filipino Cup Commissioner's Cup Governor's Cup
