= 2001 Tanduay Rhum Masters season =

- Head coach: Derrick Pumaren
- General manager: Chito Bugia
- Owner: Lucio "Bong" Tan Jr.

All-Filipino Cup results
- Record: 5–9 (35.7%)
- Place: N/A
- Playoff finish: N/A

Commissioner's Cup results
- Record: 4–7 (36.4%)
- Place: 7th seed
- Playoff finish: QF (lost to Purefoods)

Governor's Cup results
- Record: 5–8 (38.5%)
- Place: N/A
- Playoff finish: N/A

Tanduay Rhum Masters seasons

The 2001 Tanduay Rhum Masters season was the 3rd and final season of the franchise in the Philippine Basketball Association (PBA).

== Transactions ==
Players Added

Via Draft

- Oliver Agapito
- Ricky Calimag
- David Friedhof

Via Free Agency

- Bonel Balingit (From the MBA)
- Rommel Santos (From Shell Turbo Chargers)

Via Trade

- Bong Hawkins (From Alaska Aces in exchange for a future draft pick)
- Wynne Arboleda (From Pop Cola Panthers)
- Noli Locsin (From Pop Cola Panthers)
- Dindo Pumaren (From Purefoods TJ Hotdogs on March 7)
Players Lost

Via Free Agency

- Jorge Gallent
- Jaime Gayoso
- Bobby Jose
- Jomer Rubi

Via Trade

- Rudy Hatfield (To Pop Cola Panthers)
- Pido Jarencio (To Pop Cola Panthers)

== Occurrences ==
Purefoods coach Derrick Pumaren didn't renew his contract with the Hotdogs and has moved over to become the new head coach of Tanduay Rhum Masters, replacing Alfrancis Chua.

During the off-season, Tanduay tendered an offer sheet to the league's two-time MVP, San Miguel center Danny Ildefonso. The contract stipulated P96 million in 16 years which was met by stiff criticisms from the PBA Commissioner's Office. The Rhum Masters were ordered to rework the deal but instead of coming up with a revised offer sheet, Tanduay simply gave up in their bid to get Ildefonso.

Purefoods guard Dindo Pumaren, who played eight games with the Hotdogs during the All-Filipino Cup, was acquired by Tanduay upon his desire to play alongside his brother-coach, Purefoods shipped him to the Rhum Masters in favor of a future trade pick.

Fil-Am Eric Menk was not allowed to play in the first two conferences as he awaits a confirmation from the Department of Justice regarding his status.

Tanduay sold its franchise to Airfreight 2100 the following year, giving away their top players first by trading them to other teams.

== Roster ==
Tanduay Rhum Masters roster
Players

Pos.	#	POB	Name	Height	Weight	DOB (YYYY–MM–DD)	From
C	3	(Philippines)	Bonel Balingit	6 ft 9 in (2.06 m)			Visayas
F	5	(Philippines)	Allan Yu	6 ft 2 in (1.88 m)			MLQU
F	6	(Philippines)	Noli Locsin	6 ft 3 in (1.91 m)			De La Salle
G	7	(Philippines)	Dondon Hontiveros	6 ft 2 in (1.88 m)			Cebu
G	10	(Philippines)	Dindo Pumaren	5 ft 9 in (1.75 m)			De La Salle
G	19	(Philippines)	Wynne Arboleda	5 ft 11 in (1.80 m)			MLQU
F	18	(Philippines)	Ricky Calimag	6 ft 3 in (1.91 m)			San Beda
F	21	(United States)	David Friedhof	6 ft 3 in (1.91 m)
C	22	(Philippines)	Oliver Agapito	6 ft 6 in (1.98 m)			St. Benilde
G	28	(United States)	Jeffrey Cariaso	6 ft 2 in (1.88 m)			Sonoma State
F	30 & 16	(Philippines)	Bong Hawkins	6 ft 4 in (1.93 m)			UPHSD
F/C	30	(United States)	Eric Menk	6 ft 6 in (1.98 m)			Lake Superior State
G	32	(Philippines)	Rommel Santos	5 ft 11 in (1.80 m)			Staten Island
C	33	(Philippines)	Chris Cantonjos	6 ft 6 in (1.98 m)			UST
C	35	(Philippines)	Zaldy Realubit	6 ft 6 in (1.98 m)			USJ–R
G	80 & 1	(Philippines)	Jason Webb	6 ft 2 in (1.88 m)			De La Salle
F	33	(United States)	Kevin Freeman (C)	6 ft 5 in (1.96 m)			Connecticut
G	4	(United States)	Maurice Bell (G)	6 ft 2 in (1.88 m)			Louisiana–Monroe
G	12	(United States)	Billy Thomas (G)	6 ft 2 in (1.88 m)			Kansas

Coaches
Head coach
- (Philippines) Derrick Pumaren
Assistant(s)
- (Philippines) Gee Abanilla
- (Philippines) Agustin Tiongco
- (Philippines) Lawrence Chongson

Legend
- (DP) Unsigned draft pick
- (FA) Free agent
- (S) Suspended
- (C) Commissioner's Cup import
- (G) Governor's Cup import
- Injured

^{Team Manager: Chito Bugia}

== Eliminations (Won games) ==
DATE	OPPONENT	SCORE	VENUE (Location)
February 9	Sta.Lucia	76–62	Philsports Arena
February 23	Red Bull	71–66	Ynares Center
March 4	Sta.Lucia	88–85	Philsports Arena
March 21	Alaska	90–84	Philsports Arena
April 4	San Miguel	92–79	Philsports Arena
June 8	Sta.Lucia	83–76	Philsports Arena
June 24	Alaska	87–81	Araneta Coliseum
July 11	Purefoods	83–77	Philsports Arena
September 14	Swift	96–93	Philsports Arena
October 10	Purefoods	114–89	Araneta Coliseum
October 24	Shell	81–78	Philsports Arena
November 2	San Miguel	92–90 *OT	Cuneta Astrodome
November 7	Talk 'N Text	99–82	Araneta Coliseum

All-Filipino Cup Commissioner's Cup Governor's Cup
