= 2001 Sta. Lucia Realtors season =

- Head coach: Norman Black
- General Manager: Buddy Encarnado
- Owner: Sta. Lucia Realty and Development Corporation

All-Filipino Cup results
- Record: 4–10 (28.6%)
- Place: N/A
- Playoff finish: N/A

Commissioner's Cup results
- Record: 5–5 (50%)
- Place: 5th seed
- Playoff finish: QF (lost to Alaska)

Governor's Cup results
- Record: 17–7 (70.8%)
- Place: 2nd seed
- Playoff finish: Champions

Sta. Lucia Realtors seasons

The 2001 Sta.Lucia Realtors season was the 9th season of the franchise in the Philippine Basketball Association (PBA).

== Transactions ==
Players Added

Via Draft

- Francis Adriano
- Marvin Ortiguerra
- Jojo Tangkay

Via Free Agency

- Donbel Belano (Drafted by Pop Cola in 1999; previously played in the MBA)
Players Lost

Via Free Agency

- Benito Cheng (To Shell Turbo Chargers)
- Ronnie Magsanoc (To Purefoods TJ Hotdogs)
- Anastacio Mendoza
- Rob Wainwright (To Shell Turbo Chargers)

== Championship ==
The Sta.Lucia Realtors advances to the finals for only the second time in their nine-year history during the Governor's Cup, the Realtors won five straight wins in the semifinal round and enters into the championship round against the defending champion San Miguel Beermen.

With Damian Owens as their import, the Sta.Lucia Realtors won the Governor's Cup title with a 4-2 series victory over the San Miguel Beermen and captured their first PBA championship in eight years since joining the league in 1993. Shooting guard Chris Tan provided the winning triple with three seconds to go in the title-clinching 75-72 win in Game Six on December 16.

== Roster ==
2001 Sta. Lucia Realtors roster
Players

Pos.	#	POB	Name	Height	Weight	DOB (YYYY–MM–DD)	From
G	1	(Philippines)	Chris Tan	6 ft 1 in (1.85 m)	199 lb (90 kg)		De La Salle
G	4	(Philippines)	Gerardo Santiago	5 ft 10 in (1.78 m)	175 lb (79 kg)		Mapúa
C	7	(Philippines)	Richard del Rosario	6 ft 5 in (1.96 m)	215 lb (98 kg)		De La Salle
G	8	(Philippines)	Paolo Mendoza	5 ft 11 in (1.80 m)	165 lb (75 kg)		Philippines
G	9	(Philippines)	Francis Adriano	6 ft 0 in (1.83 m)	170 lb (77 kg)		Far Eastern
G	10	(Philippines)	Jercules Tangkay	6 ft 0 in (1.83 m)	168 lb (76 kg)		Southwestern-U
G/F	11	(Philippines)	Gerard Francisco	6 ft 3 in (1.91 m)	210 lb (95 kg)		UST
C	13	(Philippines)	Marlou Aquino	6 ft 9 in (2.06 m)	215 lb (98 kg)		Adamson
F	15	(Philippines)	Expedito Falcasantos	6 ft 4 in (1.93 m)	180 lb (82 kg)		Cebu
F/C	16	(Philippines)	Dennis Espino	6 ft 6 in (1.98 m)	215 lb (98 kg)		UST
F	17	(Philippines)	Michael Orquillas	6 ft 2 in (1.88 m)	170 lb (77 kg)		Cebu
C	18	(Philippines)	Marvin Ortiguerra	6 ft 5 in (1.96 m)	210 lb (95 kg)		UST
C	38	(Philippines)	Angelo David	6 ft 6 in (1.98 m)	200 lb (91 kg)		Far Eastern
G	42	(Philippines)	Donbel Belano	5 ft 8 in (1.73 m)	178 lb (81 kg)		Visayas
F	2	(United States)	Ansu Sesay (C)	6 ft 7 in (2.01 m)	225 lb (102 kg)		Mississippi
G	24	(United States)	Damian Owens (C/G)	6 ft 4 in (1.93 m)	215 lb (98 kg)		West Virginia

Coaches
Head coach
- (Philippines) Norman Black
Assistant(s)
- (Philippines) Adonis Tierra
- (Philippines) Franz Pumaren
- (Philippines) Alfrancis Chua

Legend
- (DP) Unsigned draft pick
- (FA) Free agent
- (S) Suspended
- (C) Commissioner's Cup import
- (G) Governor's Cup import
- Injured

^{Team Manager: Buddy Encarnado}

== Eliminations (Won games) ==
DATE	OPPONENT	SCORE	VENUE (Location)
February 14	Brgy.Ginebra	80-68	Philsports Arena
February 28	Mobiline	71-69	Philsports Arena
March 24	Red Bull	95-85	Malolos, Bulacan
April 11	Pop Cola	79-64	Ynares Center
June 3	Pop Cola	95-86	Araneta Coliseum
June 23	Brgy.Ginebra	85-84	San Fernando, Pampanga
June 29	San Miguel	91-88	Philsports Arena
July 4	Shell	78-69	Philsports Arena
July 18	Mobiline	81-77	Philsports Arena
September 8	Swift	84-78	Ynares Center
September 12	Red Bull	96-77	Philsports Arena
September 19	Tanduay	92-78	Araneta Coliseum
September 23	Shell	109-96	Philsports Arena
September 30	Alaska	103-98	Ynares Center
October 5	Brgy.Ginebra	121-118 *OT	Araneta Coliseum
October 13	Purefoods	97-91	Bago, Negros
October 26	Alaska	100-99 *OT	Philsports Arena

All-Filipino Cup Commissioner's Cup Governor's Cup
