= 2001 Barangay Ginebra Kings season =

- Head coach: Allan Caidic
- General manager: Ira Maniquis
- Owner: Ginebra San Miguel

All-Filipino Cup results
- Record: 14–13 (51.9%)
- Place: 5th seed
- Playoff finish: Runner-up

Commissioner's Cup results
- Record: 4–6 (40%)
- Place: 6th seed
- Playoff finish: QF (lost to Red Bull)

Governors Cup results
- Record: 6–7 (46.2%)
- Place: 8th seed
- Playoff finish: QF (Lost to Shell)

Barangay Ginebra Kings seasons

The 2001 Barangay Ginebra Kings season was the 23rd season of the franchise in the Philippine Basketball Association (PBA).

== Finals stint ==
Barangay Ginebra Kings made a return trip to the PBA championship for the first time since 1997, marking their first appearance in the post-Sonny Jaworski era. They faced off against their sister team, the San Miguel Beermen, in the 2001 All-Filipino Cup finals. The Kings reached the finals by narrowly defeating the Purefoods Tender Juicy Hotdogs in the quarterfinal, winning both games by a one-point margin. In the semifinals, they won their best-of-five series against the Shell Turbo Chargers, three games to two. Ginebra center Jun Limpot made his first finals appearance after eight years, while Vergel Meneses returned to the PBA finals for the first time since his days with Sunkist in 1995. However, the Barangay Ginebra Kings lost to the San Miguel Beermen in six games.

== Awards ==
Mark Caguioa was named the season's Rookie of the Year (ROY).

== Roster ==
2001 Barangay Ginebra Kings roster
Players

Pos.	#	POB	Name	Height	Weight	DOB (YYYY–MM–DD)	From
G	1	(Philippines)	Bal David	5 ft 9 in (1.75 m)			UST
F	2	(Philippines)	Vergel Meneses	6 ft 2 in (1.88 m)			José Rizal
G/F	3	(Philippines)	Elmer Lago	6 ft 2 in (1.88 m)			De La Salle
G	4	(Philippines)	Merwin Castelo	6 ft 2 in (1.88 m)			San Beda
F/C	9	(Philippines)	Jun Limpot	6 ft 6 in (1.98 m)			De La Salle
G	13	(Philippines)	Jayjay Helterbrand	6 ft 0 in (1.83 m)			Kentucky State
C	14	(Philippines)	Aramis Calpito	6 ft 5 in (1.96 m)			San Sebastian
C	18	(Philippines)	Wilmer Ong	6 ft 4 in (1.93 m)			USLS
C	31	(Philippines)	Marlon Basco	6 ft 6 in (1.98 m)			Luzon
F	33	(Philippines)	Teodoro Valera	6 ft 2 in (1.88 m)			UST
F	35	(Philippines)	Marlon Piodo	6 ft 5 in (1.96 m)			USJ-R
C	43	(United States)	Alex Crisano	6 ft 7 in (2.01 m)			Brooklyn
F	44	(Philippines)	Ronald Magtulis	6 ft 3 in (1.91 m)			Far Eastern
G	47	(Philippines)	Mark Caguioa	6 ft 0 in (1.83 m)			Glendale CC (CA)
C	24	(United States)	Ryan Fletcher (C)	6 ft 7 in (2.01 m)			Cincinnati
F	40	(United States)	Jerald Honeycutt (C)	6 ft 5 in (1.96 m)			Tulane
F		(United States)	Mark Jones (G)	6 ft 3 in (1.91 m)			Central Florida
G	6	(United States)	Bubba Wells (G)	6 ft 2 in (1.88 m)			Austin Peay

Coaches
Head coach
- (Philippines) Allan Caidic
Assistant(s)
- (Philippines) Cris Calilan
- (United States) Ron Jacobs

Legend
- (DP) Unsigned draft pick
- (FA) Free agent
- (S) Suspended
- (C) Commissioner's Cup import
- (G) Governor's Cup import
- Injured

== Eliminations (won games) ==
Date	Opponent	Score	Venue (location)
February 3	Tanduay	84–72	Urdaneta, Pangasinan
February 9	Alaska	63–55	Philsports Arena
February 18	Mobiline	78–69	Araneta Coliseum
February 25	Purefoods	75–73	Araneta Coliseum
March 9	Tanduay	87–76	Philsports Arena
March 23	Mobiline	77–70	Araneta Coliseum
April 11	Red Bull	101–74	Ynares Center
June 10	Purefoods	82–78	Araneta Coliseum
June 20	Tanduay	96–82	Philsports Arena
June 29	Alaska	96–83	Philsports Arena
July 6	Pop Cola	83–80	Ynares Center
September 9	Tanduay	99–96	Araneta Coliseum
September 26	Alaska	103–101	Philsports Arena
September 30	San Miguel	97–92 OT	Ynares Center
October 17	Pop Cola	105–92	Philsports Arena
November 2	Talk 'N Text		Cuneta Astrodome
November 9	Tanduay	88–85	Philsports Arena

All-Filipino Cup Commissioner's Cup Governor's Cup
