= Damian Owens =

American basketball player

Personal information
- Born: September 21, 1976 (age 50) Washington, D.C., U.S.
- Listed height: 6 ft 6 in (1.98 m)
- Listed weight: 215 lb (98 kg)

Career information
- High school: Bowie (Bowie, Maryland)
- College: West Virginia (1994–1998)
- NBA draft: 1998: undrafted
- Position: Forward

Career history
- 1998: Connecticut Skyhawks
- 1998–2000: Connecticut Pride
- 2000: Oklahoma Storm
- 2000–2001: Trenton Shooting Stars
- 2001: Maryland Mustangs
- 2001: Sta. Lucia Realtors
- 2001–2002: Gary Steelheads
- 2003: Sta. Lucia Realtors
- 2003–2004: Sioux Falls Skyforce

Career highlights
- PBA champion (2001 Governors'); PBA Best Import (2001 Governors'); CBA champion (1999); All-CBA Second Team (2000); CBA All-Defensive Team (2000); CBA All-Rookie Team (1999); First-team All-Big East (1998); 2× Third-team All-Big East (1996, 1997); Big East Defensive Player of the Year (1998)

Damian Antonio Owens (born September 21, 1976) is an American former professional basketball player. He played college basketball for the West Virginia Mountaineers. Owens played professionally in minor leagues in the United States and overseas in the Philippines. He won a Continental Basketball Association (CBA) championship in 1999 and the Philippine Basketball Association (PBA) Governors' Cup in 2001.

== Early life ==
Owens was born in Washington, D.C., and raised in Seat Pleasant, Maryland. He grew up playing basketball and football. Owens attended Bowie High School. His high school basketball coach, Tom Hendershot, was a graduate of West Virginia University and alerted the coaching staff of his alma mater to Owens. He decided to commit after being recruited by West Virginia assistant coach Dereck Whittenburg who was from his hometown.

== College career ==
Owens was a four-year starter for the West Virginia Mountaineers from 1994 to 1998. He averaged double figures in scoring every season he played. Owens led the team in rebounding as a freshman and sophomore. He was the first West Virginia player to be named to the All-Big East Conference first-team in 1998 after he was selected to the third-team in 1996 and 1997. Owens was chosen as the Big East Defensive Player of the Year in 1998. He was inducted in the WVU Sports Hall of Fame in 2016.

== Professional career ==
Owens played professionally for 10 seasons. He played in the United States Basketball League (USBL), Continental Basketball Association (CBA) and the International Basketball League (IBL) from 1998 to 2004. Owens was named to the All-CBA Second Team in 2000, the CBA All-Defensive team in 2000 and the CBA All-Rookie Team in 1999. He won an CBA championship with the Connecticut Pride in 1999. He attended training camp with the Portland Trail Blazers of the National Basketball Association (NBA) in 1999.

Owens played for the Sta. Lucia Realtors of the Philippine Basketball Association (PBA) in 2001 and 2003. He won the 2001 PBA Governors' Cup with the Realtors. Owens was chosen as the PBA Best Import of the Conference in the Governors' Cup in 2001.
