= 2001 Red Bull Thunder season =

- Head coach: Yeng Guiao
- General manager: Tony Chua
- Owner: Tony Chua

All-Filipino Cup results
- Record: 8–8 (50%)
- Place: 7th seed
- Playoff finish: QF (lost to SMB)

Commissioner's Cup results
- Record: 14–7 (66.7%)
- Place: 3rd seed
- Playoff finish: Champions

Governors Cup results
- Record: 6–8 (42.9%)
- Place: N/A
- Playoff finish: N/A

Red Bull Thunder seasons

The 2001 Red Bull Thunder season was the 2nd season of the franchise in the Philippine Basketball Association (PBA).

== Transactions ==
Players added

Via draft

- Willie Miller
- Anton Villoria

Via free agency

- Lowell Briones (From the MBA)
- Jay Mendoza (From Shell Turbo Chargers)
- Al Solis (From Mobiline; played 12 games in the All-Filipino Cup before moving to MBA)
Players lost

Via free agency

- Cris Bolado (To Pop Cola Panthers)

== Championship ==
In only their second year of participation and fifth conference so far, the Batang Red Bull Thunder have already won a PBA title. Behind Best Import Antonio Lang, the Thunder upset the highly favored San Miguel Beermen, winners of five of the last six conferences, with a 4–2 series victory in the Commissioner's Cup finals. Red Bull coach Yeng Guiao won his third championship as a head coach and his first since 1993.

== Roster ==
2001 Red Bull Thunder roster
Players

Pos.	#	POB	Name	Height	Weight	DOB (YYYY–MM–DD)	From
G	3	(Philippines)	Jimwell Torion	5 ft 9 in (1.75 m)			SCSIT
F	4	(United States)	Davonn Harp	6 ft 4 in (1.93 m)			Kutztown
G	6	(Philippines)	Ato Agustin	5 ft 11 in (1.80 m)			Lyceum
F	7	(Australia)	Mick Pennisi	6 ft 9 in (2.06 m)			Eastern Michigan
F	28 & 8	(Philippines)	Lowell Briones	6 ft 3 in (1.91 m)			Visayas
F	9	(Philippines)	Jay Mendoza	6 ft 3 in (1.91 m)			Mapúa
F	10	(Philippines)	Junthy Valenzuela	6 ft 2 in (1.88 m)			SCSIT
G	11	(Philippines)	Willie Miller	5 ft 10 in (1.78 m)			Letran
G	12	(Philippines)	Glenn Capacio	6 ft 0 in (1.83 m)			Far Eastern
G	13	(Philippines)	Anton Villoria	5 ft 11 in (1.80 m)			Letran
F	14	(Philippines)	Bernard Tanpua	6 ft 3 in (1.91 m)			UPHSD
F	15	(Philippines)	Lordy Tugade	6 ft 3 in (1.91 m)			National-U
F	20	(Philippines)	Edmund Reyes	6 ft 3 in (1.91 m)			UST
C	21	(Philippines)	Kerby Raymundo	6 ft 6 in (1.98 m)			Letran
G		(Philippines)	Al Solis	6 ft 0 in (1.83 m)			Visayas
F	42	(United States)	Antonio Lang (C)	6 ft 7 in (2.01 m)			Duke
G	23	(United States)	Raymond Tutt (G)	6 ft 2 in (1.88 m)

Coaches

Head coach

- (Philippines) Yeng Guiao

Assistant coach(es)

- (Philippines) Roehl Nadurata

Legend

- (C) Team captain
- (C) Commissioner's Cup Import
  - (G) Governor's Cup Import
- Injured

^{Team Manager: Tony Chua and Andy Jao}

== Eliminations (won games) ==
DATE	OPPONENT	SCORE	VENUE (Location)
February 7	Shell	76–60	Philsports Arena
February 11	Mobiline	80–68	Araneta Coliseum
February 16	Alaska	73-72	Philsports Arena
February 28	San Miguel	78–76	Philsports Arena
March 3	Brgy.Ginebra	79–72	Iloilo City
March 9	Shell	65–58	Philsports Arena
April 4	Sta.Lucia	87–84	Philsports Arena
June 10	Mobiline	97-92	Araneta Coliseum
June 15	Brgy.Ginebra	111–98	Philsports Arena
June 24	Shell	94-82	Araneta Coliseum
July 1	Pop Cola	95–79	Araneta Coliseum
July 8	Sta.Lucia	95–88	Araneta Coliseum
July 13	Tanduay	104–98	Philsports Arena
September 23	Tanduay	108–93	Philsports Arena
September 29	Talk 'N Text	99–85	Dumaguete
October 14	Shell	68–62	Ynares Center
October 19	Sta.Lucia	101–94	Cuneta Astrodome
October 24	Brgy.Ginebra	93–72	Philsports Arena
November 7	San Miguel	86–81	Araneta Coliseum

All-Filipino Cup Commissioner's Cup Governor's Cup
