= 2001 Shell Turbo Chargers season =

- Head coach: Perry Ronquillo
- General Manager: Bobby Villarosa

All-Filipino Cup results
- Record: 12–10 (54.5%)
- Place: 1st seed
- Playoff finish: Semis (lost to Brgy.Ginebra)

Commissioner's Cup results
- Record: 3–7 (30%)
- Place: N/A
- Playoff finish: N/A

Governor's Cup results
- Record: 11–9 (55%)
- Place: 1st seed
- Playoff finish: Semifinals

Shell Turbo Chargers seasons

The 2001 Shell Turbo Chargers season was the 17th season of the franchise in the Philippine Basketball Association (PBA).

== Transactions ==
Players Added

Via Draft

- Mike Hrabak

Via Free Agency

- Benito Cheng (From Sta. Lucia Realtors)
- Alejandro Lim (Return to the team)
- Rob Wainwright (From Sta. Lucia Realtors)
Players Lost

Via Free Agency

- Jay Mendoza (To Red Bull Thunder)
- Rommel Santos (To Tanduay Rhum Masters)

== Roster ==
2001 Shell Turbo Chargers roster
Players

Pos.	#	POB	Name	Height	Weight	DOB (YYYY–MM–DD)	From
F	3	(United States)	Chris Jackson	6 ft 4 in (1.93 m)	210 lb (95 kg)		San Bernardino Valley
G	5	(United States)	Rob Wainwright	6 ft 5 in (1.96 m)	195 lb (88 kg)		Solano CC
F	8	(Philippines)	Alejandro Lim	6 ft 4 in (1.93 m)	186 lb (84 kg)		Visayas
G	12	(Philippines)	Porferio Marzan	6 ft 2 in (1.88 m)	180 lb (82 kg)		Baguio
F	13	(Philippines)	Mark Telan	6 ft 7 in (2.01 m)	210 lb (95 kg)		De La Salle
C	14	(Philippines)	Benjie Paras	6 ft 5 in (1.96 m)	215 lb (98 kg)		Philippines
F	16	(Philippines)	Benito Cheng	6 ft 3 in (1.91 m)	200 lb (91 kg)		Mapúa
F	19	(Philippines)	Joel Dualan	6 ft 3 in (1.91 m)	240 lb (109 kg)		Manila
G	30	(Philippines)	Gerry Esplana	6 ft 0 in (1.83 m)	180 lb (82 kg)		Far Eastern
F	32	(Philippines)	Mike Hrabak	6 ft 6 in (1.98 m)	220 lb (100 kg)		Central Arizona
C	34	(Philippines)	Art Del Rosario	6 ft 5 in (1.96 m)	228 lb (103 kg)
G	35	(United States)	Tony Dela Cruz	6 ft 5 in (1.96 m)	205 lb (93 kg)		UC Irvine
G	50	(Philippines)	Dale Singson	6 ft 0 in (1.83 m)	184 lb (83 kg)		UST
F	4	(United States)	Joaquin Hawkins (C)	6 ft 4 in (1.93 m)	205 lb (93 kg)		Long Beach State
F	7	(United States)	Tremaine Wingfield (C)	6 ft 5 in (1.96 m)	224 lb (102 kg)		Texas
F	24	(United States)	Askia Jones (G)	6 ft 3 in (1.91 m)	200 lb (91 kg)		Kansas State

Coaches
Head coach
- (Philippines) Perry Ronquillo
Assistant(s)
- (Philippines) Joey Guanio

Legend
- (DP) Unsigned draft pick
- (FA) Free agent
- (S) Suspended
- (C) Commissioner's Cup import
- (G) Governor's Cup import
- Injured

== Eliminations (Won games) ==
DATE	OPPONENT	SCORE	VENUE (Location)
February 2	Mobiline	68–59	Philsports Arena
February 10	Purefoods	77–67	Lipa, Batangas
February 14	Tanduay	93–86	Philsports Arena
February 23	Alaska	76–71	Ynares Center
March 2	Tanduay	91–75	Philsports Arena
March 14	San Miguel	80–73 *OT	Philsports Arena
March 18	Brgy.Ginebra	75–68	Ynares Center
March 23	Pop Cola	81–79	Araneta Coliseum
March 28	Sta.Lucia	82–72	Philsports Arena
June 3	Tanduay	74–67	Araneta Coliseum
July 8	Alaska	83–66	Araneta Coliseum
July 15	Brgy.Ginebra	85–72	Ynares Center
September 14	Alaska	99–81	Philsports Arena
September 28	Purefoods	95–94	Araneta Coliseum
October 5	Pop Cola	90–83	Araneta Coliseum
October 7	San Miguel	95–85	Philsports Arena
October 20	Brgy.Ginebra	82–67	Balanga, Bataan
October 28	Red Bull	86–71	Araneta Coliseum
November 4	Sta.Lucia	111–88	Araneta Coliseum
November 9	Purefoods	96–83	Philsports Arena

All-Filipino Cup Commissioner's Cup Governor's Cup
