= 2001 Alaska Aces season =

- Head coach: Tim Cone
- General manager: Joaqui Trillo
- Owner: Wilfred Uytengsu

All-Filipino Cup results
- Record: 8–8 (50%)
- Place: 6th seed
- Playoff finish: QF (lost to Pop Cola)

Commissioner's Cup results
- Record: 9–7 (56.3%)
- Place: 4th seed
- Playoff finish: Semis (lost to SMB)

Governors Cup results
- Record: 9–10 (47.4%)
- Place: 6th seed
- Playoff finish: Semifinals

Alaska Aces seasons

The 2001 Alaska Aces season was the 16th season of the franchise in the Philippine Basketball Association (PBA).

== Transactions ==
Players Added

Via Draft

- John Arigo
- Kenny Evans

Via Free Agency

- Eric Reyes (From Mobiline Phone Pals)
- Richie Ticzon (From the MBA)

Via Trade

- Jon Ordonio (From Pop Cola Panthers)
- Ali Peek (From Pop Cola Panthers)
Players Lost

Via Trade

- Johnny Abarrientos (To Pop Cola Panthers)
- Poch Juinio (To Pop Cola Panthers)
- Bong Hawkins (To Tanduay Rhum Masters for a future draft pick)

== Occurrences ==
Former best import awardee and the league's second recipient of the Mr.100% award, Sean Chambers, the winningest PBA import, announced his retirement after three games into the Governor's Cup, Chambers came in as a replacement for Terrance Badgett during the Commissioner's Cup and led the Aces to the semifinal round.

== Roster ==
2001 Alaska Aces roster
Players

Pos.	#	POB	Name	Height	Weight	DOB (YYYY–MM–DD)	From
F	3	(Philippines)	Glen Peter Yap	6 ft 3 in (1.91 m)			Adamson
G	4	(United States)	Kenny Evans	6 ft 2 in (1.88 m)			San Francisco State
G	7	(United States)	Jon Ordonio	6 ft 2 in (1.88 m)			Master's
C	8	(Philippines)	Don Allado	6 ft 6 in (1.98 m)			De La Salle
G	9	(Philippines)	Rodney Santos	6 ft 1 in (1.85 m)			San Sebastian
F	10	(Philippines)	Eric Reyes	6 ft 3 in (1.91 m)			Ateneo
G	11	(Philippines)	Richie Ticzon	5 ft 8 in (1.73 m)			Ateneo
C	17	(Philippines)	Kevin Ramas	6 ft 6 in (1.98 m)			Mapúa
G/F	19	(Philippines)	Kenneth Duremdes	6 ft 3 in (1.91 m)			Adamson
F	21	(Philippines)	Bryan Gahol	6 ft 4 in (1.93 m)			Philippines
C	22	(United States)	James Walkvist	6 ft 9 in (2.06 m)
G/F	31	(United States)	John Arigo	6 ft 5 in (1.96 m)			Tampa
F	34 & 2	(United States)	Ali Peek	6 ft 4 in (1.93 m)			Saint Mary's
F	32	(United States)	Terrance Badgett (C)	6 ft 4 in (1.93 m)			Nebraska
F	20	(United States)	Sean Chambers (C/G)	6 ft 0 in (1.83 m)			Cal Poly
G		(United States)	Dexter Boney (G)	6 ft 2 in (1.88 m)			UNLV
G		(United States)	Ron Riley (G)	6 ft 2 in (1.88 m)			Arizona State

Coaches
Head coach
- (United States) Tim Cone
Assistant(s)
- (Philippines) Gilbert Reyes
- (Philippines) Dickie Bachmann
- (Philippines) Luigi Trillo

Legend
- (DP) Unsigned draft pick
- (FA) Free agent
- (S) Suspended
- (C) Commissioner's Cup Import
  - (G) Governor's Cup Import
- Injured

^{Team Manager: Joaquin Trillo}

== Eliminations (Won games) ==
DATE	OPPONENT	SCORE	VENUE (Location)
January 28	Sta.Lucia	91–84	Araneta Coliseum
February 25	Pop Cola	100–92	Araneta Coliseum
March 2	Purefoods	84–71	Philsports Arena
March 7	Mobiline	73–71	Ynares Center
March 11	Red Bull	95–76	Araneta Coliseum
March 28	Mobiline	74–63	Philsports Arena
April 8	Tanduay	87–82	Araneta Coliseum
June 2	Red Bull	84–81	Balanga, Bataan
June 8	Pop Cola	99–96	Philsports Arena
June 13	San Miguel	94–84	Ynares Center
June 20	Sta.Lucia	99–94	Philsports Arena
July 15	Mobiline	101–67	Ynares Center
October 6	Tanduay	96–92 OT	Cebu City
October 10	Red Bull	86–81	Araneta Coliseum
October 17	Purefoods	108–102	Philsports Arena
October 31	Red Bull	98–91	Philsports Arena
November 4	Pop Cola	85–75	Araneta Coliseum
November 14	Shell	86–68	Philsports Arena

All-Filipino Cup Commissioner's Cup Governor's Cup
