= Roger Yap =

Filipino basketball player

USJ-R Jaguars
- Title: Head coach
- League: CESAFI

Personal information
- Born: August 3, 1977 (age 49) Cebu, Philippines
- Listed height: 6 ft 0 in (1.83 m)
- Listed weight: 170 lb (77 kg)

Career information
- College: USJ–R
- PBA draft: 2001: 1st round, 9th overall pick
- Drafted by: Purefoods Tender Juicy Hotdogs
- Playing career: 2001–2013; 2018–2019
- Position: Point guard / shooting guard
- Coaching career: 2026–present

Career history

Playing
- 2001–2002: Purefoods Tender Juicy Hotdogs
- 2003–2004: FedEx Express
- 2004–2005: Shell Turbo Chargers
- 2005–2012: Purefoods Tender Juicy Hotdogs/B-Meg Llamados
- 2012: San Miguel Beermen
- 2012–2013: Barako Bull Energy
- 2018–2019: Manila Stars

Coaching
- 2026–present: USJ-R Jaguars

Career highlights
- 4x PBA All-Star (2005–2007, 2010); PBA Mythical First Team 2005–06; PBA Mythical Second Team 2009–10; PBA All-Defensive Team 2009–10; PBL Most Valuable Player (2000 Chairman's)

Rogelio "Roger" Yap (born August 3, 1977) is a Filipino former professional basketball player and head coach who is currently the head coach of the University of San Jose–Recoletos (USJ-R) Jaguars of the Cebu Schools Athletic Foundation Inc. (CESAFI).

Yap played college basketball for the University of San Jose–Recoletos in Cebu City before making a name for himself in the Philippine Basketball League (PBL), winning the PBL Most Valuable Player award in 2000. Yap was then drafted by the Purefoods Tender Juicy Hotdogs of the Philippine Basketball Association (PBA) with the ninth overall pick in the 2001 PBA draft. Yap spent twelve years in the PBA, becoming a three-time PBA champion and a four-time PBA All-Star. In addition, Yap also had stints in the ASEAN Basketball League (ABL) and the Maharlika Pilipinas Basketball League (MPBL).

== Statistics ==
Legend
GP	Games played	MPG	Minutes per game
FG%	Field-goal percentage	3P%	3-point field-goal percentage	FT%	Free-throw percentage
RPG	Rebounds per game	APG	Assists per game	SPG	Steals per game
BPG	Blocks per game	PPG	Points per game	**Bold**	Career high

Correct as of February 18, 2017

=== Season ===
Year	Team	GP	MPG	FG%	3P%	FT%	RPG	APG	SPG	BPG	PPG
2001	Purefoods	33	26.0	.369	.160	.419	1.8	.7	.8	.1	3.7
2002	Purefoods	35	16.4	.336	.240	.586	2.1	2.3	.5	.1	3.7
2003	FedEx	41	22.3	.409	**.351**	.780	2.9	2.5	**1.7**	.2	7.1
2004-05	Shell	**71**	24.2	.432	.302	.713	3.7	3.6	1.2	.3	9.0
2005-06	Purefoods	57	**28.5**	.361	.230	.631	4.2	**4.0**	1.6	.2	7.1
2006-07	Purefoods	38	26.8	.407	.233	.622	3.2	3.0	1.1	.3	7.1
2007-08	Purefoods	48	28.0	.399	.234	.639	**4.8**	3.8	1.2	.3	7.5
2008-09	Purefoods	28	22.3	.316	.190	.756	3.9	2.9	1.1	.2	4.9
2009-10	Purefoods/B-Meg Derby Ace	64	27.4	.411	.328	.731	4.6	**4.0**	1.0	**.4**	**10.0**
2010-11	B-Meg	39	28.4	.355	.200	.779	4.0	**4.0**	1.2	.3	7.0
2011-12	B-Meg	20	19.6	.447	.200	**.808**	3.1	2.5	.5	.2	4.6
2012-13	Barako Bull	15	19.4	**.465**	.294	.704	2.8	1.8	.6	.3	6.0
Career		489	25.0	.394	.266	.689	3.6	3.2	1.1	.3	7.1
