= Oliver Agapito =

Filipino basketball player

Personal information
- Born: October 6, 1973 (age 53) Puerto Princesa, Philippines
- Listed height: 6 ft 6 in (1.98 m)
- Listed weight: 210 lb (95 kg)

Career information
- College: De La Salle; Benilde
- PBA draft: 2001: 2nd round, 11th overall pick
- Drafted by: Tanduay Rhum Masters
- Playing career: 2001–2006
- Position: Center

Victor Oliver Agapito (born October 6, 1973) is a Filipino former professional basketball player in the Philippine Basketball Association (PBA). He also briefly played in the Metropolitan Basketball Association.
