= 2001 San Miguel Beermen season =

- Head coach: Jong Uichico
- General manager: Robert Non
- Owner: San Miguel Corporation

All-Filipino Cup results
- Record: 17–9 (65.4%)
- Place: 2nd seed
- Playoff finish: Champions

Commissioner's Cup results
- Record: 12–8 (60%)
- Place: 1st seed
- Playoff finish: Runner-up

Governors Cup results
- Record: 13–12 (52%)
- Place: 4th seed
- Playoff finish: Runner-up

San Miguel Beermen seasons

The 2001 San Miguel Beermen season was the 27th season of the franchise in the Philippine Basketball Association (PBA).

== Transactions ==
Players Added

Via Draft

- Joey Mente

Via Free Agency

- Henry Fernandez (From Pop Cola)
- Arnold Gamboa (Comebacking SMB player, last played in the MBA)
- Dorian Peña (Signed on April 11, recruited from the MBA)
Players Lost

Via Free Agency

- June Carmona
- Ronilo Padilla

Via Retirement

- Arturo dela Cruz

== Championship (finals stint) ==
The San Miguel Beermen contested for all three championships of the season. The Beermen won their 16th PBA title in the All-Filipino Cup by defeating Barangay Ginebra Kings in six games as they are now winners of five of the last six conferences.

In the Commissioner's Cup, San Miguel advances to the finals by winning over Alaska Aces, three games to two, in their best-of-five semifinal series. As the odds-on favorite against sophomore team Batang Red Bull, who were making their first trip to the championship, the defending champion Beermen were surprisingly upset by the Thunder in six games. It was coach Jong Uichico's first loss in the PBA finals since handling the Beermen at the start of the 1999 season.

San Miguel was back in the finals for the fifth straight conference in the season-ending Governor's Cup with import Lamont Strothers returning to help the Beermen defend the crown they won the past two seasons. San Miguel make it to the semifinals with a seven wins and six loss tied with Pop Cola Panthers. Starting the semifinal round, San Miguel and Shell Turbo Chargers battled it out for the second finals berth after the Sta. Lucia Realtors advances first. On December 2, the Beermen outlasted Shell in overtime, 92-88, for their third straight finals appearance, via played the Sta.Lucia Realtors for the second time in the championship of the 2000 era. The Beermen lost to the Realtors in six games and placed runner-up in the last two conferences of the 2001 season.

== Award ==
Danny Ildefonso won the Most Valuable Player trophy for the second straight time and becoming the third PBA player to win back-to-back MVP honors, joining William "Bogs" Adornado (1975–1976) and Alvin Patrimonio (1993–1994).

== Roster ==
2001 San Miguel Beermen roster
Players

Pos.	#	POB	Name	Height	Weight	DOB (YYYY–MM–DD)	From
G	1	(Philippines)	Emmanuel Victoria	5 ft 10 in (1.78 m)			San Beda
C	3	(United States)	Nic Belasco	6 ft 6 in (1.98 m)			Notre Dame (OH)
C	6	(United States)	Dorian Peña	6 ft 6 in (1.98 m)			Coppin State
F	7	(Philippines)	Michael Mustre	6 ft 1 in (1.85 m)			Letran
F/C	10	(Philippines)	Danny Ildefonso	6 ft 6 in (1.98 m)			National-U
F	15	(Philippines)	Dwight Lago	6 ft 3 in (1.91 m)			De La Salle
G	17	(Philippines)	Olsen Racela	5 ft 10 in (1.78 m)			Ateneo
G	21	(Philippines)	Joey Mente	5 ft 11 in (1.80 m)			Lyceum
F/C	22	(Philippines)	Arnold Gamboa	6 ft 6 in (1.98 m)			Far Eastern
F	25	(Philippines)	Freddie Abuda	6 ft 4 in (1.93 m)			Visayas
F		(Philippines)	Henry Fernandez	6 ft 1 in (1.85 m)			Visayas
F	32	(United States)	Rob Duat	6 ft 4 in (1.93 m)			Menlo
F	42	(United States)	Danny Seigle	6 ft 6 in (1.98 m)			Wagner
F	24	(United States)	Nate Johnson (C)	6 ft 5 in (1.96 m)			Louisville
G	33	(United States)	Lamont Strothers (G)	6 ft 2 in (1.88 m)			Christopher Newport

Coaches
Head coach
- (Philippines) Jong Uichico
Assistant(s)
- (Philippines) Siot Tanquingcen
- (Philippines) Arturo Dela Cruz

Legend
- (DP) Unsigned draft pick
- (FA) Free agent
- (S) Suspended
- (C) Commissioner's Cup import
- (G) Governor's Cup import
- Injured

== Eliminations (won games) ==
DATE	OPPONENT	SCORE	VENUE (Location)
January 31	Brgy.Ginebra	92–88	Philsports Arena
February 4	Sta.Lucia	89–76	Araneta Coliseum
February 11	Pop Cola	85–79	Araneta Coliseum
February 18	Tanduay	96–79	Araneta Coliseum
March 4	Pop Cola	78–63	Philsports Arena
March 7	Purefoods	90–84 *OT	Ynares Center
March 17	Alaska	85–75	Bago
March 30	Red Bull	78–76	Philsports Arena
April 8	Mobiline	67–66	Araneta Coliseum
June 6	Purefoods	100–80	Philsports Arena
June 9	Shell	81–73	Malolos, Bulacan
June 17	Red Bull	87–83	Araneta Coliseum
June 22	Mobiline	92–73	Philsports Arena
July 1	Tanduay	95–83	Araneta Coliseum
July 11	Brgy.Ginebra	101–92	Philsports Arena
July 13	Pop Cola	107–76	Philsports Arena
September 12	Purefoods	114–91	Philsports Arena
September 16	Brgy.Ginebra	97–82	Cuneta Astrodome
October 12	Pop Cola	86–84	Cuneta Astrodome
October 14	Tanduay	85–79	Ynares Center
October 21	Alaska	71–64	Araneta Coliseum
October 26	Talk 'N Text	79–75	Philsports Arena
November 11	Sta.Lucia	81–76	Araneta Coliseum

All-Filipino Cup Commissioner's Cup Governor's Cup
