= Central Arizona College =

Public community college in Arizona, U.S.

Coordinates: 32.9557438°N 111.6526577°W

- Other name: CAC
- Motto: Learn more, earn more.
- Type: Public community college
- Established: 1969; 57 years ago
- Academic affiliations: Space-grant
- President: Lisa Rhine
- Students: 10,231 (total 2015-2016 enrollment)
- Location: Near Coolidge, Arizona, U.S.
- Campus: Signal Peak Campus, Aravaipa Campus, Superstition Mountain Campus, Maricopa Campus, San Tan Campus, Casa Grande Center, Corporate Center
- Colors: Green and gold
- Mascots: Vaqueros and Vaqueras
- Website: www.centralaz.edu

Central Arizona College (CAC) is a public community college near Coolidge, Arizona. CAC serves the population of Pinal County.

== History and campus ==
Central Arizona College was founded in 1969.

With five campuses and three centers located throughout the county, campuses include: Signal Peak, located in Coolidge, Arizona, Aravaipa, located in Winkelman, Arizona, Superstition Mountain, located in Apache Junction, Arizona, Maricopa, located in Maricopa, Arizona, and San Tan, located in San Tan Valley, Arizona. The three centers include The Casa Grande and Corporate Centers, located in Casa Grande, Arizona and the Florence Center, located in Florence, Arizona.

== Organization and administration ==
Jacquelyn Elliott became President/CEO of Central Arizona College on July 1, 2016.

== Academics ==
The college offers an array of academic degrees and certificates, career training and personal enrichment classes. Online and university transfer courses along with continuing education classes and workshops are also offered, providing learning opportunities for community members.

== Sports ==
The mascot for Central Arizona is the Vaquero/Vaquera for women's teams (vaquero/a is Spanish for cowboy). Their colors are gold and green. They participate in the National Junior College Athletic Association, the Arizona Community College Athletic Conference, and the Western States Football League. CAC competes in Division 1 in the NJCAA. The Vaqueros have won 39 National Titles. CAC fields 10 intercollegiate teams, five for men and five for women. Men's sports at Central Arizona College include baseball, basketball, cross country, track and field and rodeo. The Vaqueras women compete in basketball, softball, and cross country, track and field and rodeo.

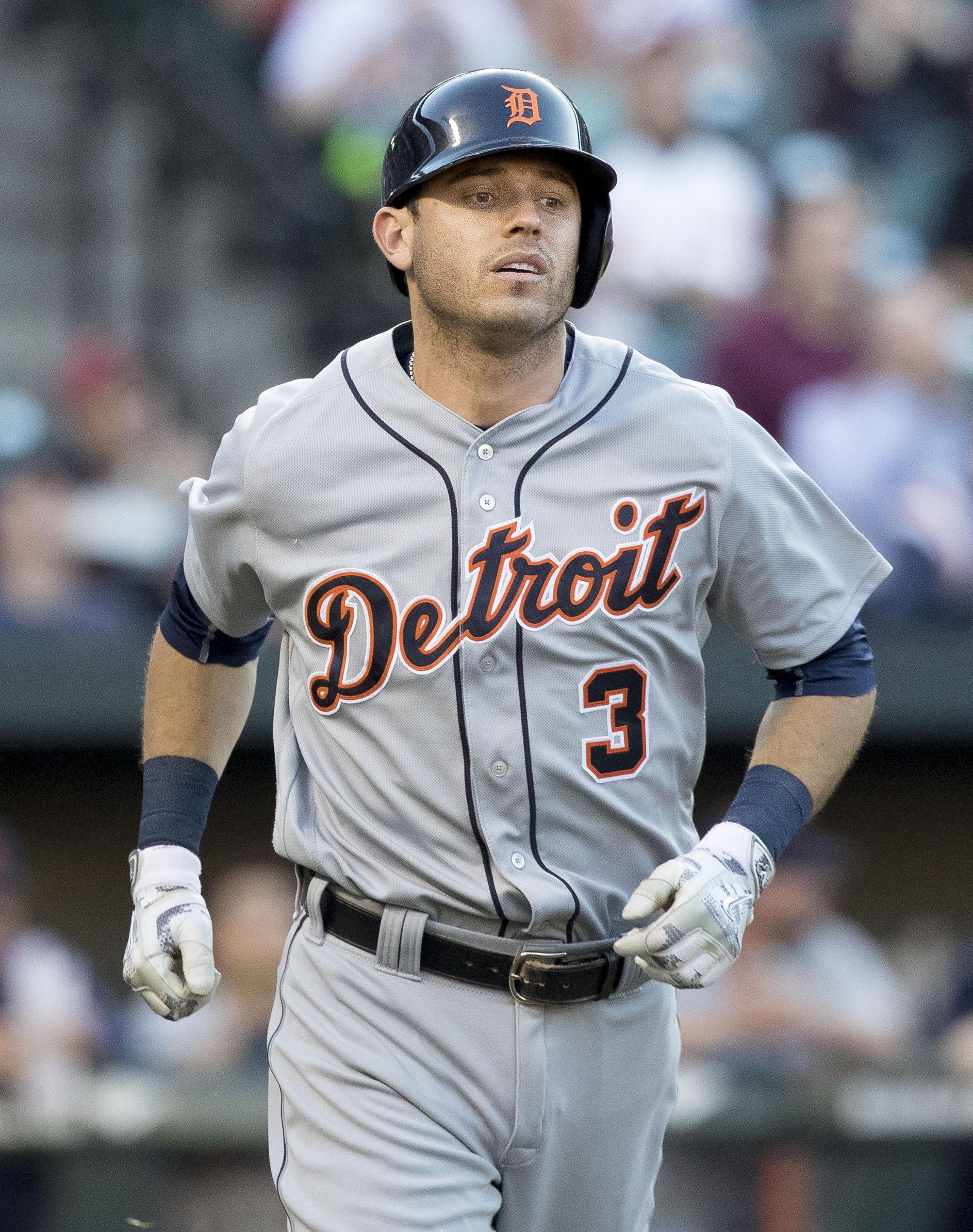
Ian Kinsler

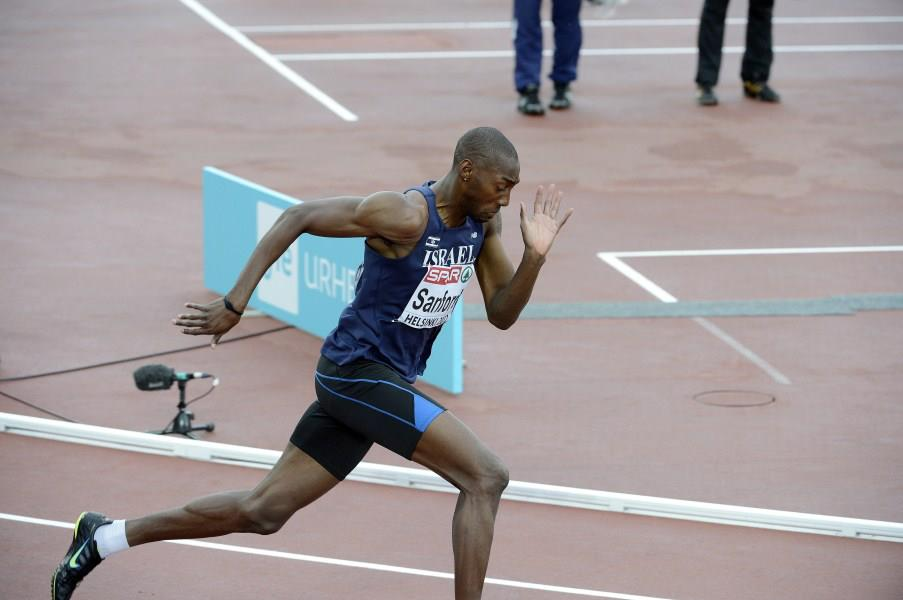
Donald Sanford

== Notable alumni ==
- Tony Barnette, professional baseball player
- Matt Brase, professional basketball coach
- Brent Gaff, professional baseball player
- Scott Hairston, professional baseball
- Rich Harden, professional baseball player
- Mike Hrabak, professional basketball player
- Zepherinus Joseph, runner
- Ian Kinsler, professional baseball player
- Todd Kohlhepp, convicted serial killer
- Bob Lacey, professional baseball player
- Obed Mutanya, distance runner
- Matt Pagnozzi, professional baseball player
- Tom Pagnozzi, professional baseball player
- Bridget Pettis, professional basketball player
- Donald Sanford, American-Israeli Olympic sprinter
- TJ Shope, member of the Arizona House of Representatives
- Josh Spence, professional baseball player
- Dan Wheeler, professional baseball player
- Matt Wilkinson, professional baseball player
