= 2001 PBA season =

27th PBA season

- Duration: January 28 – December 16, 2001
- Teams: 10
- TV partner: Viva TV (IBC)

2001 PBA Draft
- Top draft pick: Willie Miller
- Picked by: Batang Red Bull Thunder
- Season MVP: Danny Ildefonso (San Miguel Beermen)
- All-Filipino Cup champions: San Miguel Beermen
- All-Filipino Cup runners-up: Barangay Ginebra Kings
- Commissioner's Cup champions: Batang Red Bull Thunder
- Commissioner's Cup runners-up: San Miguel Beermen
- Governors Cup champions: Sta. Lucia Realtors
- Governors Cup runners-up: San Miguel Beermen

Seasons
- ← 2000 2002 →

The 2001 PBA season was the 27th season of the Philippine Basketball Association (PBA).

== Board of governors ==
=== Executive committee ===
- Emilio Bernardino, Jr. (Commissioner)
- Ignatius Yenko (Chairman, representing Mobiline Phone Pals)
- Francisco Alejo III (Vice-Chairman, representing Purefoods TJ Hotdogs)
- Jose Ma. Concepcion III (Treasurer, representing Pop Cola Panthers)

=== Teams ===
Team	Company	Governor	Alternate Governor
Alaska Aces	Alaska Milk Corporation	Wilfred Steven Uytengsu	Joaquin Trillo
Barangay Ginebra Kings	La Tondeña Distillers, Inc.	Casiano Cabalan Jr.	Ira Daniel Maniquis
Mobiline Phone Pals	Philippine Long Distance Telephone Company	Ignatius Yengko	Deobrah Anne Tan
Pop Cola Panthers	Republic Flour Mills Corporation	Jose Ma. Concepcion III	Elmer Yanga
Purefoods TJ Hotdogs	Purefoods Corporation	Francisco Alejo III	
Red Bull Thunder	Energy Food and Drinks Inc.	Salvador Cusipag, Jr.	
Sta. Lucia Realtors	Sta. Lucia Realty and Development Corporation	Manuel Encarnado	
San Miguel Beermen	San Miguel Brewery, Inc.	Alberto Villa-Abrille, Jr.	Alberto Manlapit
Shell Turbo Chargers	Pilipinas Shell Petroleum Corporation	Reynaldo Gamboa	
Tanduay Rhum Masters	Basic Holdings Corporation	Lucio Tan Jr.	David De Joya

== Notable occurrences ==
- Due to the aftermath of the Second EDSA Revolution, the uncertainty of opening a new PBA season became imminent were unsure if they will still continue in taking part of the league. Likewise, it was then not known who will be in charge of the PBA's main venue, the ULTRA and Viva TV TV network partner IBC. The league eventually opened its season at The ULTRA on January 28 and was aired on PTV.
- During the pre-season, Tanduay made soundwaves in the PBA when they dangled Danny Ildefonso of corporate rival San Miguel Beermen a whopping 16-year, 96 million peso offersheet. The league though, nullified the said deal since it was believed that the offersheet violated the team's salary cap.
- Danny Ildefonso of San Miguel became the third player to win the Most Valuable Player (MVP) award for two straight seasons, Ildefonso also sets a record by sweeping the season's Best Player of the Conference award, his unprecedented feat started in 2000 when he emerged as the award winner in the Commissioner's and Governors' Cups, his BPC wins surpassed the three apiece won by Vergel Meneses and Alvin Patrimonio.
- Purefoods' Alvin Patrimonio became the first player to suit up for 500 straight games
- Alaska import Sean Chambers hung up his number 20 jersey after 13 years in a highly emotional retirement ceremony.
- The corporate sale of Purefoods, including its PBA franchise, to San Miguel Corporation at the end of the year was eventually approved by the Board of Governors, the Hotdogs became the third team under the San Miguel corporate umbrella.
- Paul Asi Taulava and Eric Menk, two fil-foreign players, returned to their respective ballclubs, Taulava reunited with the Phone Pals around mid-year while Menk suited up for Tanduay a little later.
- In a stunning move in late December, Tanduay shipped Eric Menk, Dondon Hontiveros, Bonel Balingit and Chris Cantonjos to other teams as a prelude to Tanduay's subsequent sale of its franchise to FedEx, the delivery firm, for P 75 million.

== Opening ceremonies ==
The muses for the participating teams are as follows:

Team	Muse
Alaska Aces	Vanessa Garcia
Batang Red Bull Thunder	Sandra Seifert and Josephine Bonizado
Barangay Ginebra Kings	Geneva Cruz
Pop Cola Panthers	Ruffa Mae Quinto
Mobiline Phone Pals	Patricia Javier
Purefoods TJ Hotdogs	Antoinette Taus
San Miguel Beermen	Phoemela Baranda
Shell Turbo Chargers	Pia Guanio
Sta. Lucia Realtors	Marielle Lopez and Jeremie Antiporda
Tanduay Rhum Masters	Janna Victoria

== 2001 PBA All-Filipino Cup ==
=== Elimination round ===
Pos	Team	W	L	PCT	GB	Qualification
1	Shell Turbo Chargers	9	5	.643 (Note: Head-to-head record: Shell 1–0 San Miguel)	—	Twice-to-beat in the quarterfinals
2	San Miguel Beermen	9	5	.643	—	Twice-to-beat in the quarterfinals
3	Pop Cola Panthers	8	6	.571 (Note: Head-to-head record: Pop Cola 1–0 Purefoods)	1	Twice-to-beat in the quarterfinals
4	Purefoods TJ Hotdogs	8	6	.571	1	Twice-to-beat in the quarterfinals
5	Barangay Ginebra Kings	7	7	.500 (Note: Head-to-head record: Barangay Ginebra 2–0, Alaska 1–1, Red Bull 0–2)	2	Twice-to-win in the quarterfinals
6	Alaska Aces	7	7	.500	2	Twice-to-win in the quarterfinals
7	Batang Red Bull Thunder	7	7	.500	2	Twice-to-win in the quarterfinals
8	Mobiline Phone Pals	6	8	.429	3	Twice-to-win in the quarterfinals
9	Tanduay Rhum Masters	5	9	.357	4	
10	Sta. Lucia Realtors	4	10	.286	5	

Source: PBA.ph

=== Playoffs ===
Quarterfinals (Top 4 twice-to-beat)
1	Shell	72	80
8	Mobiline	76	69
4	Purefoods	76	69
5	Ginebra	77	70
2	San Miguel	73	84
7	Red Bull	85	82
3	Pop Cola	71	74
6	Alaska	78	65

Semifinals (Best-of-5)
1	Shell	2
5	Ginebra	3
2	San Miguel	3
3	Pop Cola	1

Finals (Best-of-7)
5	Ginebra	2
2	San Miguel	4
Third place playoff
1	Shell	75
3	Pop Cola	83

==== Quarterfinals ====
Team 1	Series	Team 2	Game 1	Game 2
(1) Shell Turbo Chargers*	1–1	(8) Mobiline Phone Pals	72–76	80–69
(2) San Miguel Beermen*	1–1	(7) Red Bull Thunder	73–85	84–82
(3) Pop Cola Panthers*	1–1	(6) Alaska Aces	71–78	74–65
(4) Purefoods TJ Hotdogs*	0–2	(5) Barangay Ginebra Kings	76–77	69–70

*Team has twice-to-beat advantage. Team 1 only has to win once, while Team 2 has to win twice.

==== Semifinals ====
Team 1	Series	Team 2	Game 1	Game 2	Game 3	Game 4	Game 5
(1) Shell Turbo Chargers	2–3	(5) Barangay Ginebra Kings	78–90	72–74	113–87	78–67	66–75
(2) San Miguel Beermen	3–1	(3) Pop Cola Panthers	64–73	81–66	82–75	91–78	—

==== Third place playoff ====
Team 1	Score	Team 2
(1) Shell Turbo Chargers	75–83	(3) Pop Cola Panthers

==== Finals ====
Team 1	Series	Team 2	Game 1	Game 2	Game 3	Game 4	Game 5	Game 6	Game 7
(2) San Miguel Beermen	4–2	(5) Barangay Ginebra Kings	81–75	89–72	80–82	64–80	98–95 (OT)	95–75	—

== 2001 PBA Commissioner's Cup ==
=== Elimination round ===
Pos	Team	W	L	PCT	GB	Qualification
1	San Miguel Beermen	7	2	.778	—	Twice-to-beat in the quarterfinals
2	Purefoods TJ Hotdogs	6	3	.667 (Note: Head-to-head record: Purefoods 85–75 Red Bull)	1	Twice-to-beat in the quarterfinals
3	Batang Red Bull Thunder	6	3	.667	1	Twice-to-beat in the quarterfinals
4	Alaska Aces	5	4	.556 (Note: Head-to-head record: Alaska 99–94 Sta. Lucia)	2	Twice-to-beat in the quarterfinals
5	Sta. Lucia Realtors	5	4	.556	2	Twice-to-win in the quarterfinals
6	Barangay Ginebra Kings	4	5	.444	3	Twice-to-win in the quarterfinals
7	Tanduay Rhum Masters	3	6	.333 (Note: Head-to-head differential: Pop Cola +21, Mobiline +15, Shell −13, Tanduay −23; seventh-seed playoff: Tanduay 88–82 Pop Cola; eighth-seed playoff: Mobiline 71–56 Shell)	4	Twice-to-win in the quarterfinals
8	Mobiline Phone Pals	3	6	.333	4	Twice-to-win in the quarterfinals
9	Shell Turbo Chargers	3	6	.333	4	
10	Pop Cola Panthers	3	6	.333	4	

Source: PBA.ph

=== Playoffs ===
Quarterfinals (Top 4 twice-to-beat)
1	San Miguel	81
8	Mobiline	71
4	Alaska	78
5	Sta. Lucia	68
2	Purefoods	82
7	Tanduay	74
3	Red Bull	82
6	Brgy. Ginebra	70

Semifinals (Best-of-5)
1	San Miguel	3
4	Alaska	2
2	Purefoods	2
3	Red Bull	3

Finals (Best-of-7)
1	San Miguel	2
3	Red Bull	4
Third-place playoff
2	Purefoods	89
4	Alaska	96

==== Quarterfinals ====
Team 1	Series	Team 2	Game 1	Game 2
(1) San Miguel Beermen*	1–0	(8) Mobiline Phone Pals	81–71	—
(2) Purefoods TJ Hotdogs*	1–0	(7) Tanduay Rhum Masters	82–74	—
(3) Batang Red Bull Thunder*	1–0	(6) Barangay Ginebra Kings	82–70	—
(4) Alaska Aces*	1–0	(5) Sta. Lucia Realtors	78–68	—

*Team has twice-to-beat advantage. Team 1 only has to win once, while Team 2 has to win twice.

==== Semifinals ====
Team 1	Series	Team 2	Game 1	Game 2	Game 3	Game 4	Game 5
(1) San Miguel Beermen	3–2	(4) Alaska Aces	66–75	78–71	80–74	91–96 (OT)	83–71
(2) Purefoods TJ Hotdogs	2–3	(3) Batang Red Bull Thunder	91–75	76–95	84–100	77–75	77–87

==== Third place playoff ====
Team 1	Score	Team 2
(2) Purefoods TJ Hotdogs	89–96	(4) Alaska Aces

==== Finals ====
Team 1	Series	Team 2	Game 1	Game 2	Game 3	Game 4	Game 5	Game 6	Game 7
(1) San Miguel Beermen	2–4	(3) Batang Red Bull Thunder	78–80	86–92	100–91	88–72	77–79	69–75	—

== 2001 PBA Governors' Cup ==
=== Elimination round ===
Pos	Team	W	L	PCT	GB	Qualification
1	Shell Turbo Chargers	8	5	.615 (Note: Head-to-head record: Shell 1–1 Sta. Lucia; Shell +10, Sta. Lucia −10)	—	Twice-to-beat in the quarterfinals
2	Sta. Lucia Realtors	8	5	.615	—	Twice-to-beat in the quarterfinals
3	Pop Cola Panthers	7	6	.538 (Note: Head-to-head record: Pop Cola 3–1, San Miguel 2–2, Talk 'N Text 1–3)	1	Twice-to-beat in the quarterfinals
4	San Miguel Beermen	7	6	.538	1	Twice-to-beat in the quarterfinals
5	Talk 'N Text Phone Pals	7	6	.538	1	Twice-to-win in the quarterfinals
6	Alaska Aces	6	7	.462 (Note: Head-to-head differential: Alaska +10, Red Bull +9, Barangay Ginebra −19)	2	Twice-to-win in the quarterfinals
7	Batang Red Bull Thunder	6	7	.462	2	Twice-to-win in the quarterfinals
8	Barangay Ginebra Kings	6	7	.462	2	Twice-to-win in the quarterfinals
9	Tanduay Rhum Masters	5	8	.385 (Note: Head-to-head record: Tanduay 1–0 Purefoods)	3	
10	Purefoods TJ Hotdogs	5	8	.385	3	

Source: PBA.ph

=== Playoffs ===
Quarterfinals (Top 4 twice-to-beat)
1	Shell	75	106
8	Ginebra	97	87
4	San Miguel	77
5	Talk 'N Text	63
2	Sta. Lucia	97
7	Red Bull	93
3	Pop Cola	88
6	Alaska	78

Semifinals (Best-of-5)
1	Shell	0
4	San Miguel	3
2	Sta. Lucia	3
3	Pop Cola	2

Finals (Best-of-7)
4	San Miguel	2
2	Sta. Lucia	4
Third-place playoff
1	Shell	96
3	Pop Cola	87

==== Quarterfinals ====
Team 1	Series	Team 2	Game 1	Game 2
(1) Shell Turbo Chargers*	1–1	(8) Barangay Ginebra Kings	75–97	106–87
(2) Sta. Lucia Realtors*	1–0	(7) Batang Red Bull Thunder	97–93	—
(3) Pop Cola Panthers*	1–0	(6) Alaska Aces	88–78	—
(4) San Miguel Beermen*	1–0	(5) Talk 'N Text Phone Pals	77–63	—

*Team has twice-to-beat advantage. Team 1 only has to win once, while Team 2 has to win twice.

==== Semifinals ====
Team 1	Series	Team 2	Game 1	Game 2	Game 3	Game 4	Game 5
(1) Shell Turbo Chargers	0–3	(4) San Miguel Beermen	84–89	70–83	88–92 (OT)	—	—
(2) Sta. Lucia Realtors	3–2	(3) Pop Cola Panthers	75–76	76–69	76–86	97–80	86–74

==== Third place playoff ====
Team 1	Score	Team 2
(1) Shell Turbo Chargers	96–87	(3) Pop Cola Panthers

==== Finals ====
Team 1	Series	Team 2	Game 1	Game 2	Game 3	Game 4	Game 5	Game 6	Game 7
(2) Sta. Lucia Realtors	4–2	(4) San Miguel Beermen	86–80	78–86	83–74	73–106	85–71	75–72	—

== Awards ==
- Most Valuable Player: Danny Ildefonso (San Miguel)
- Rookie of the Year: Mark Caguioa (Barangay Ginebra)
- Sportsmanship Award: Rey Evangelista (Purefoods)
- Most Improved Player: Noy Castillo (Purefoods)
- Defensive Player of the Year: Chris Jackson (Shell)
- Mythical Five
  - Danny Ildefonso (San Miguel)
  - Danny Seigle (San Miguel)
  - Olsen Racela (San Miguel)
  - Dennis Espino (Sta. Lucia)
  - Ali Peek (Alaska)
- Mythical Second Team
  - Noy Castillo (Purefoods)
  - Kenneth Duremdes (Alaska)
  - Nic Belasco (San Miguel)
  - Rudy Hatfield (Pop Cola)
  - Davonn Harp (Red Bull)
- All Defensive Team
  - Chris Jackson (Shell)
  - Dennis Espino (Sta. Lucia)
  - Marlou Aquino (Sta. Lucia)
  - Rey Evangelista (Purefoods)
  - Patrick Fran (Mobiline/Talk 'N Text)

=== Awards given by the PBA Press Corps ===
- Coach of the Year: Yeng Guiao (Red Bull)
- Mr. Quality Minutes: Mark Caguioa (Barangay Ginebra)
- Executive of the Year: Sonny Barios (PBA executive director)
- Referee of the Year: Ernie de Leon

== Cumulative standings ==
Pos	Team	Pld	W	L	PCT	Best finish
1	San Miguel Beermen	70	43	27	.614	Champions
2	Batang Red Bull Thunder	51	28	23	.549	Champions
3	Sta. Lucia Realtors	49	25	24	.510	Champions
4	Alaska Aces	46	23	23	.500	Third place
5	Shell Turbo Chargers	51	25	26	.490	Third place
6	Purefoods TJ Hotdogs	45	22	23	.489	Semifinalist
7	Barangay Ginebra Kings	52	25	27	.481	Finalist
8	Pop Cola Panthers	51	24	27	.471	Third place
9	Mobiline/Talk 'N Text Phone Pals	42	18	24	.429	Quarterfinalist
10	Tanduay Rhum Masters	37	14	23	.378	Quarterfinalist

=== Elimination round ===
Pos	Team	Pld	W	L	PCT
1	San Miguel Beermen	36	23	13	.639
2	Shell Turbo Chargers	36	20	16	.556
3	Purefoods TJ Hotdogs	36	19	17	.528
4	Batang Red Bull Thunder	36	19	17	.528
5	Alaska Aces	36	18	18	.500
6	Pop Cola Panthers	36	18	18	.500
7	Sta. Lucia Realtors	36	17	19	.472
8	Barangay Ginebra Kings	36	17	19	.472
9	Mobiline/Talk 'N Text Phone Pals	36	16	20	.444
10	Tanduay Rhum Masters	36	13	23	.361

=== Playoffs ===
Pos	Team	Pld	W	L
1	San Miguel Beermen	34	20	14
2	Batang Red Bull Thunder	15	9	6
3	Sta. Lucia Realtors	13	8	5
4	Barangay Ginebra Kings	16	8	8
5	Pop Cola Panthers	15	6	9
6	Alaska Aces	10	5	5
7	Shell Turbo Chargers	15	5	10
8	Purefoods TJ Hotdogs	9	3	6
9	Mobiline/Talk 'N Text Phone Pals	5	2	3
10	Tanduay Rhum Masters	2	1	1
