= 1999 MBA Season =

1999 Metropolitan Basketball Association Season
- Sport: Basketball
- Duration: February 7 - December 8, 1999
- Games: 30
- Teams: 15
- TV partner(s): ABS-CBN; Studio 23; PTV (during the playoffs and the finals)
- League champions: Manila Metrostars
- Runners-up: Cebu Gems
- Season MVP: Alex Compton

Seasons
- ← 1998 2000 →

The 1999 MBA season was the second season of the Metropolitan Basketball Association. The season started on February 7, 1999 and concluded on December 8, 1999 when the Manila Metrostars defeated the Cebu Gems in six games in the 1999 MBA National Finals.

This season saw the league expand to 15 teams, with the San Juan Knights, Nueva Ecija Patriots and Surigao Miners as expansion teams.

== Teams ==
=== Northern Conference ===
Division 1

- Pampanga Dragons
- Manila Metrostars
- Pangasinan Waves
- Nueva Ecija Patriots

Division 2

- Laguna Lakers
- Pasig Rizal Pirates
- Batangas Blades
- San Juan Knights

=== Southern Conference ===
Division 1

- Negros Slashers
- Cebu Gems
- Iloilo Megavoltz

Division 2

- Davao Eagles
- Socsargen Marlins
- Cagayan de Oro Amigos
- Surigao Miners

== Standings ==
Northern Conference
Division	Team	GP	W	L	PCT	Head coach
Division I	Manila Metrostars	30	26	4	.867	Louie Alas
Division I	Pampanga Dragons	30	16	14	.533	Aric del Rosario / Romy Lopez
Division I	Nueva Ecija Patriots	30	7	23	.233	Nemie Villegas
Division I	Pangasinan Waves	30	5	25	.167	Chot Reyes / Robert Sison
Division II	Pasig Rizal Pirates	30	23	7	.767	Joel Banal
Division II	San Juan Knights	30	20	10	.667	Philip Cezar
Division II	Laguna Lakers	30	16	14	.533	—
Division II	Batangas Blades	30	12	18	.400	Bong Ramos

Southern Conference
Division	Team	GP	W	L	PCT	Head coach
Division I	Negros Slashers	30	19	11	.633	Jun Noel
Division I	Cebu Gems	30	18	12	.600	Tonichi Yturri
Division I	Iloilo Megavoltz	30	17	13	.567	Danny Gavieres
Division II	Davao Eagles	30	20	10	.667	Francis Rodriguez
Division II	Socsargen Marlins	30	10	20	.333	Biboy Ravanes
Division II	Cagayan de Oro Amigos	30	10	20	.333	—
Division II	Surigao Miners	30	6	24	.200	Bo Perasol

== Playoffs ==
Team	W-L	PCT.	Finish
Manila Metrostars	12-6	.667	MBA Champions
Iloilo Megavoltz	8-6	.571	
Cebu Gems	11-9	.550	MBA Runner Up
Pasig-Rizal Pirates	7-6	.538	
San Juan Knights	5-6	.455	
Davao Eagles	3-4	.429	
Pampanga Dragons	4-6	.400	
SocSarGen Marlins	2-4	.333	
Laguna Lakers	1-2	.333	
Batangas Blades	1-2	.333	
Cagayan de Oro Amigos	1-2	.333	
Negros Slashers	1-3	.250	
