= 2000 MBA Season =

2000 Metropolitan Basketball Association Season
- Sport: Basketball
- Duration: February 13 - November 25, 2000
- Games: 26
- Teams: 14
- TV partner(s): ABS-CBN; Studio 23
- League champions: San Juan Knights
- Runners-up: Negros Slashers
- Season MVP: Rommel Adducul

Seasons
- ← 1999 2001 →

The 2000 MBA season was the third season of the Metropolitan Basketball Association. The season began on February 13, 2000 and concluded on November 25, 2000 when the San Juan Knights defeated the Negros Slashers in six games of the 2000 MBA National Finals.

The season saw the league contract to 14 teams, with the Pangasinan Waves folding.

== Teams ==
=== Northern Conference ===
- Pampanga Dragons
- Manila Metrostars
- Nueva Ecija Patriots
- Laguna Lakers
- Pasig Rizal Pirates
- Batangas Blades
- San Juan Knights

=== Southern Conference ===
- Negros Slashers
- Cebu Gems
- Iloilo Megavoltz
- Davao Eagles
- Socsargen Marlins
- Cagayan de Oro Amigos
- Surigao Warriors

== Regular Season Standings ==
Northern Conference
Team	W	L	PCT.
San Juan Knights	18	8	.692
Pasig-Rizal Pirates	18	8	.692
Laguna Lakers	17	9	.654
Manila Metrostars	17	9	.654
Pampanga Dragons	12	14	.462
Batangas Blades	12	14	.462
Nueva Ecija Patriots	10	16	.385

Southern Conference
Team	W	L	PCT.
Cebu Gems	17	9	.654
Davao Eagles	17	9	.654
Negros Slashers	15	11	.577
Iloilo Megavoltz	10	16	.385
Cagayan de Oro Amigos	7	19	.269
Socsargen Marlins	7	19	.269
Surigao Warriors	5	21	.192

== The Crossover ==
The Crossover tournament started on February 13 and ended on June 17. With the San Juan Knights defeating the Laguna Lakers 2-0 in the first ever crossover tournament champions.

Northern Conference
Team	W	L
Laguna Lakers	12	2
San Juan Knights	11	3
Pasig-Rizal Pirates	9	5
Pampanga Dragons	9	5
Manila Metrostars	8	6
Batangas Blades	8	6
Nueva Ecija Patriots	5	9

Southern Conference
Team	W	L
Davao Eagles	8	6
Negros Slashers	8	6
Cebu Gems	7	7
Iloilo Megavoltz	4	10
Cagayan de Oro Amigos	4	10
Socsargen Marlins	3	11
Surigao Warriors	2	12

=== The Crossover Playoffs ===
The Crossover Semifinals
1	Laguna	106
4	Pampanga	96
3	Pasig-Rizal	62
2	San Juan	69

The Crossover Finals
Laguna	0
San Juan	2

== Intra-Conference Challenge ==
The Intra-Conference Challenge started on June 24 and concluded on October 11. When the Cebu Gems claim the title sweeping the Manila Metrostars in the Finals.

Northern Conference
Team	W	L
Manila Metrostars	9	3
Pasig-Rizal Pirates	9	3
San Juan Knights	7	5
Laguna Lakers	5	7
Nueva Ecija Patriots	5	7
Batangas Blades	4	8
Pampanga Dragons	3	9

Southern Conference
Team	W	L
Cebu Gems	10	2
Davao Eagles	9	3
Negros Slashers	7	5
Iloilo Megavoltz	6	6
Socsargen Marlins	4	8
Cagayan de Oro Amigos	3	9
Surigao Warriors	3	9

=== Intra-Conference Challenge Playoffs ===
Intra-Conference Challenge Semifinals
1	Cebu	87
4	Pasig-Rizal	76
3	Davao	89
2	Manila	109

Intra-Conference Challenge Finals
Cebu	2
Manila	0

== 2000 National Playoffs ==
National Playoffs (best-of-3)
1	San Juan	2
4	Laguna	0
2	Pasig	0
3	Manila	2
1	Cebu	2
4	Iloilo	1
2	Davao	0
3	Negros	2

Conference Finals (best-of-5)
1	San Juan	3
3	Manila	1
1	Cebu	1
3	Negros	3

MBA National Finals (best-of-7)
1	San Juan	4
3	Negros	2
