= 1998 MBA Season =

1998 Metropolitan Basketball Association Season
- Sport: Basketball
- Duration: March 7 - October 31, 1998
- Games: 22
- Teams: 12
- TV partner(s): ABS-CBN; Studio 23; Sarimanok News Network
- League champions: Pampanga Dragons
- Runners-up: Negros Slashers
- Season MVP: John Ferriols

Seasons
- 1999 →

The 1998 MBA season was the inaugural season of the Metropolitan Basketball Association. The MBA played its first game on March 7, 1998, at the Don Narciso Ramos Sports Complex in Lingayen, Pangasinan. and ended on October 31. The Playoffs began on August 26 and ended on October 31, 1998 when the Pampanga Dragons defeated the Negros Slashers in five games in the 1998 MBA National Finals.

== Teams ==
=== Northern Conference ===
- Pampanga Dragons
- Manila Metrostars
- Laguna Lakers
- Pasig Blue Pirates
- Pangasinan Presidents
- Batangas Blades

=== Southern Conference ===
- Negros Slashers
- Cebu Gems
- Davao Eagles
- Socsargen Marlins
- Cagayan de Oro Nuggets
- Iloilo Volts

== Standings ==
Northern Conference
Team	W	L	PCT.
Pampanga Dragons	14	8	.636
Laguna Lakers	14	8	.636
Pasig Blue Pirates	13	9	.591
Manila Metrostars	12	10	.545
Batangas Blades	10	12	.455
Pangasinan Presidents	6	15	.286

Southern Conference
Team	W	L	PCT.
Davao Eagles	14	8	.636
Negros Slashers	13	9	.591
Socsargen Marlins	11	11	.500
Cebu Gems	10	12	.455
Cagayan de Oro Nuggets	8	13	.381
Iloilo Volts	6	16	.273

== Semifinals ==
Pos	Team	W	L	PCT	Status
1	Pampanga Dragons	4	2	.667	Conference Finals
2	Manila Metrostars	4	3	.571	Conference Finals
3	Laguna Lakers	3	4	.429	Eliminated
4	Pasig Blue Pirates	2	4	.333	Eliminated

Updated to match(es) played on unknown. Source:

Pos	Team	W	L	PCT	Status
1	Negros Slashers	5	1	.833	Conference Finals
2	Cebu Gems	4	2	.667	Conference Finals
3	Davao Eagles	3	3	.500	Eliminated
4	Socsargen Marlins	0	6	.000	Eliminated

Updated to match(es) played on unknown. Source:

== Playoffs ==
MBA Conference Finals
1	Pampanga	4
4	Manila	2
3	Cebu	3
2	Negros	4

MBA National Finals
Pampanga	4
Negros	1

== 1998 MBA National Finals ==
October 17 Pampanga 95-94 OT Negros ; Pampanga Leads 1–0

October 18 Pampanga 86-92 Negros ; Tied 1–1

October 21 Negros 91-99 Pampanga ; Pampanga Leads 2–1

October 28 Negros 97-118 Pampanga ; Pampanga Leads 3–1

October 31 Negros 85-89 Pampanga ; Pampanga Wins 4–1
