= 2001 MBA Season =

2001 Metropolitan Basketball Association Season
- Sport: Basketball
- Duration: June 3 - December 19, 2001
- Games: 28
- Teams: 8
- TV partner(s): ABS-CBN; PTV/NBN
- First Phase champions: Andok's San Juan Knights
- First Phase runners-up: Negros Slashers
- Second Phase champions: LBC-Batangas Blades
- Second Phase runners-up: Negros Slashers

Seasons
- ← 2000 2002 →

The 2001 MBA Season was the fourth season of the Metropolitan Basketball Association. The season began on June 3, 2001 with a new format akin its rival Philippine Basketball Association. The league used a two conferences starting with the First Phase and ending with Second Phase Nationals. The Andok's San Juan Knights won the First Phase championship defeating the Negros Slashers in 3–1 on August 24, 2001. The Second Phase concluded on December 19, 2001 where the LBC-Batangas Blades again defeating Negros for the championship 3-1.

6 Teams have folded from the league: Cagayan de Oro Amigos, Iloilo Megavoltz, LBC-Manila Metrostars, Pampanga Dragons, Pasig-Rizal Pirates and Surigao Warriors. Which brought to a league low 8 teams participating in the season since its start in 1998.

The league was also broadcast by ABS-CBN Sports for the fourth and final season as a exclusive broadcast contract for the league as aired over PTV (later renanamed the National Broadcasting Network) but because of UAAP coverage was prioritized exclusively broadcast on Studio 23 for the 64th season.

== Teams ==
=== Northern Conference ===
- Nueva Ecija Patriots
- FedEx Laguna Lakers
- LBC Batangas Blades
- Andok's San Juan Knights

=== Southern Conference ===
- Negros Slashers
- Cebuana Lhuiller Gems
- TPG Davao Eagles
- SocSarGen/Taguig Marlins

== First Phase ==
Northern Conference
Team	W-L	Playoffs
LBC-Batangas Blades	11-3	1-2
Andok's San Juan Knights	10-4	6-2
FedEx Laguna Lakers	7-7	0-1
Nueva Ecija Patriots	3-11	

Southern Conference
Team	W-L	Playoffs
Negros Slashers	10-4	3-3
Cebuana Lhuiller Gems	10-4	0-2
TPG Davao Eagles	3-11	
SocSarGen/Taguig Marlins	2-12	

== Phase Two "Nationals" ==
Northern Conference
Team	W-L	Playoffs
LBC-Batangas Blades	11-3	6-2
FedEx Laguna Lakers	11-3	0-2
Andok's San Juan Knights	9-5	3-3
Nueva Ecija Patriots	3-11	

Southern Conference
Team	W-L	Playoffs
Negros Slashers	10-4	4-5
Cebuana Lhuiller Gems	5-9	4-3
TPG Davao Eagles	4-10	0-2
SocSarGen/Taguig Marlins	3-11	

=== 2001 National Playoffs ===
National Playoffs (best-of-3)
LBC-Batangas (bye)
FedEx Laguna	0
Andok's San Juan	2
Negros (bye)
Cebuana Lhuiller	2
TPG Davao	0

Conference Finals (best-of-5)
LBC-Batangas	3
Andok's San Juan	1
Negros	3
Cebuana Lhuiller	2

2001 MBA National Finals (best-of-5)
1	LBC-Batangas	3
3	Negros	1
