= 2002 MBA Season =

2002 Metropolitan Basketball Association Season
- Sport: Basketball
- Duration: April 6 - July 26, 2002
- Games: 15-16
- Teams: 9
- TV partner: Silverstar Sports (NBN)
- First Phase champions: RCPI-Negros Slashers
- First Phase runners-up: LBC-Batangas Blades

Seasons
- ← 2001

The 2002 MBA Season was the fifth and final season of the Metropolitan Basketball Association. The season started on April 6, 2002. The First Phase concluded with the RCPI-Negros Slashers winning their first title over the LBC-Batangas Blades in a 3–0 sweep. league would fold halfway the Second Phase on July 26, 2002, due to the high expenses in funding a regional basketball league, with ABS-CBN also withdrawing the funding for the league before the start of the season but Silverstar Communications Inc. took over for the league's official broadcast for the season. Several players went to the semi-professional Philippine Basketball League en route to the PBA.

== Teams ==
=== Northern Conference ===
- Sunkist-Pampanga Stars
- Osaka Pangasinan Waves
- LBC-Batangas Blades
- Olongapo Volunteers/Gilbey's-Olongapo Volunteers

=== Southern Conference ===
- RCPI Negros Slashers
- Cebuana Lhuiller Gems
- Professional Davao Eagles
- Casino Cagayan de Oro Amigos

== First Conference ==
Northern Conference
Team	W	L
Olongapo Volunteers	7	3
LBC Batangas Blades	6	4
Osaka Pangasinan Waves	5	5
Sunkist-Pampanga Stars	1	9

Southern Conference
Team	W	L
RCPI Negros Slashers	7	3
Professional Davao Eagles	6	4
Cebuana Lhuillier Gems	6	4
Casino Cagayan De Oro Amigos	2	8

=== First Conference Playoffs ===
Quarterfinals
1	Olongapo	75
4	LBC Batangas	76
3	RCPI Negros	93
2	Professional Davao	90

First Conference Finals
LBC Batangas	0
RCPI Negros	2

== Second Phase " The Nationals" ==
The league would fold during the season on July 26, 2002. Thus cancelling the conference and thus marked the end of the MBA.

Northern Conference
Team	W	L
Gilbey's-Olongapo Volunteers	4	2
LBC-Batangas Blades	4	2
Sunkist-Pampanga Stars	2	3
Osaka Pangasinan Waves	1	4

Southern Conference
Team	W	L
Professional Davao Eagles	4	1
Casino Cagayan De Oro Amigos	3	2
Cebuana Lhuiller Gems	2	3
RCPI-Negros Slashers	1	4
