= 2001 MBA finals =

2001 edition of Metropolitan Basketball Association National Finals

Team	Coach	Wins
LBC-Batangas Blades	Nash Racela	3
Negros Slashers	Robert Sison	1
- Dates: December 12–19, 2001
- MVP: Eddie Laure
- Northern finals: Blades defeated Andok's-San Juan Knights
- Southern finals: Slashers defeated Cebuana Lhuillier Gems

The 2001 MBA Finals (or the 2001 MBA National Finals) was the championship round of the Metropolitan Basketball Association (MBA)'s 2001 season, and the conclusion of the season's playoffs in second phase.

== Series summary ==
Game	Date	Road team	Result	Home team
Game 1	December 12	Negros Slashers	84–87 (0–1)	LBC-Batangas Blades
Game 2	December 14	Negros Slashers	74–85 (0–2)	LBC-Batangas Blades
Game 3	December 16	LBC-Batangas Blades	71–80 (2–1)	Negros Slashers
Game 4	December 19	LBC-Batangas Blades	94–75 (3–1)	Negros Slashers

=== Game 1 ===
Studio 23

December 12

Negros Slashers 84, LBC-Batangas Blades 87
Blades leads the series, 1–0

La Salle Centrum, Batangas

1999 titlist Manila Metrostars members Rommel Adducul, Alex Compton and Peter Martin started out hot that seated LBC-Batangas comfortably on top, 54–31, at halftime. But the Blades turned cold, as the Slashers starting to come-back led by John Ferriols, who shot a one-handed fallaway shot capped a string of runs that put the Slashers back in the game, that also made Slashers lead 80–76. But Eddie Laure stepped up to score five of the Blades’ next seven points, foiling the three-time Southern Conference champions’ rally with an 87–84 victory.

=== Game 2 ===
Studio 23

December 14

Negros Slashers 74, LBC-Batangas Blades 85
Blades leads the series, 2–0

Mail and More Arena, Manila

Due to the Blades' tough defense, 25-9 first quarter spree, they only held the Slashers to only three points in the last seven minutes of fourth quarter to seal an 85–74 victory. Alex Compton scored 25 points, six rebounds, two assists and one shot block, while Tony Boy Espinosa, who with Laure anchored Batangas’ win in the opener, actually keyed the team's decisive 17–3 run midway in the fourth that turned a 68–71 deficit into a rousing victory. With Compton at the firing end, the Blades surged to a and were still comfortably on top entering the fourth quarter, 68–54. A basket each by Ferriols, the league’s MVP in 1998, and Johnedel Cardel against Adducul’s inside stab put Negros within, 84-85. But Espinosa secured the win for the Blades by sinking two pressure-packed charities.

=== Game 3 ===
Studio 23

December 16

LBC-Batangas Blades 71, Negros Slashers 80
Blades leads the series, 2–1

University of Saint La Salle Gym, Bacolod

Slashers, led by Dino Aldeguer's 15 points with Reynel Hugnatan's 20 rebounds brings a fourth quarter run that secured Slashers' win and prevent a sweep by Blades.

=== Game 4 ===
Studio 23

December 19

LBC-Batangas Blades 94, Negros Slashers 75
Blades leads the series, 3–1

University of Saint La Salle Gym, Bacolod

With Espinosa and Rommel Adducul on the firing end, the Blades roared to a 26–17 lead in the first quarter while Compton joined in spearheading the Blades’ breakaway in the early going, hitting the treys and knocking in jump shots from the perimeter and underneath as the visiting squad roared to a 50-28 bulge at the turn. With the three and help from Ralph Rivera, Bladed was lifted to a 47–23 lead. Espinosa erupted for 21 points, including 17 in the first two quarters that set the tone for the rout.

Blades then thwarted the Slashers’ repeated rallies in the fourth period to humble their more experienced rivals on their first championship appearance and kept the Northern Conference tradition of winning all four MBA diadems with a 94–75 victory and bag the MBA national crown.
