= Eddie Laure =

Filipino basketball player (born 1977)

The Honorable Eddie B. Laure
- Born: Eddie Bicoy Laure; June 6, 1977 (age 49); Dipolog, Zamboanga del Norte, Philippines
- Other name: Cenon
- Occupations: Athlete, politician
- Height: 6 ft 3 in (191 cm)
- Political party: PDP-Laban
- Spouse: Jovie Cruz
- Children: 4 (including EJ and Eya)

Member, Sangguniang Bayan of Katipunan, Zamboanga del Norte
- In office June 30, 2022 – June 30, 2025
- Basketball career

Personal information
- Born: June 6, 1977 (age 49) Dipolog, Zamboanga del Norte, Philippines
- Listed height: 6 ft 3 in (1.91 m)
- Listed weight: 195 lb (88 kg)

Career information
- College: Adamson
- PBA draft: 2003: 1st round, 3rd overall pick
- Drafted by: Shell Turbo Chargers
- Playing career: 1998–2015
- Position: Small forward
- Coaching career: 2016–2019

Career history

Playing
- 1998–2002: Batangas/LBC-Batangas Blades
- 2003: Shell Turbo Chargers
- 2004–2006: Purefoods Tender Juicy Hotdogs
- 2006–2008: Alaska Aces
- 2008–2010: Rain or Shine Elasto Painters
- 2010–2011: Powerade Tigers
- 2011–2012: Philippine Patriots
- 2012–2014: Alaska Aces
- 2014–2015: Blackwater Elite
- 2015: Mahindra Enforcer

Coaching
- 2016–2019: UST (women) (assistant)
- 2018–2019: Laguna Heroes (assistant)

Career highlights
- MBA champion (2001); MBA Most Valuable Player (2001); MBA Mythical First Team (2001); MBA Mythical Second Team (2000); MBA Rookie of the Year (1998); MBA Scoring champion (2001)

Eddie Bicoy Laure (born July 6, 1977) is a Filipino former professional basketball player, coach and politician. Known by many as The Dominator and more recently, The Bounty Hunter for his daring and stunning ability to search and get loose balls on the court, he is a former MBA MVP.

== Amateur career ==
Laure played for the Adamson Falcons in the UAAP from 1994 to 1997 alongside future PBA superstars Kenneth Duremdes and Marlou Aquino. He also played in the PBL during his time prior to the pro ranks, winning an MVP once.

== Professional career ==
=== Metropolitan Basketball Association ===
In 1998, Laure joined the Batangas Blades in the newly formed professional Metropolitan Basketball Association. Despite playing for the Blades teams from 1998 to 2000, Laure was the cornerstone of the franchise, playing in several All-Star games and the Mythical Team award.

In 2001, he was later joined by former Manila Metrostars players Rommel Adducul and Alex Compton to lead Batangas to their only MBA National Championship over the Negros Slashers. Laure was later named the Most Valuable Player of the 2001 season and the last player in MBA history to win the award before its closure in 2002.

=== Short return to the PBL ===
After the MBA's demise, Laure joined the Welcoat Paintmasters in the 2002 PBL Challenge Cup. Laure played with a team of Rommel Adducul, Ronald Tubid, Marc Pingris, and Ervin Sotto.

Laure was named in the Mythical Five of the said tournament and the Paintmasters won the title via a 3–0 sweep over Dazz Dishwashing. Laure then opted to turn pro again in 2003.

=== Philippine Basketball Association ===
In 2003, Laure was selected third overall by the Shell Turbo Chargers in the PBA Draft. He had a decent rookie campaign with Shell posting double figures in points but was unable to lead the Turbo Chargers to a respectable record.

He was traded in 2004 to Purefoods for Billy Mamaril but struggled in his stint with the TJ Hotdogs while nursing a knee injury. The 6'4 forward played for just 24 games in the 2004–05 season, and hardly a factor on offense but had a few games where he shone on the defensive end.

In the 2005–06 season, he joined the Alaska Aces and was a key contributor off the bench. Due to the injury of Reynel Hugnatan, he was given significant playing time. Along with Hugnatan, Laure was also joined by John Ferriols, a fellow former MBA MVP, in a trio of former MBA superstars in the Alaska fold.

24 hours after the 2008 Rookie Draft proper, he was traded to his former PBL team, the Rain or Shine Elasto Painters, together with fifth overall pick Solomon Mercado for former No. 1 pick, Joe Devance, and two future second round picks.

In the off-season of 2010, he was traded to the Powerade Tigers together with Rain or Shine's 1st round pick in 2011 in exchange for Larry Rodriguez.

He also has a stint with the AirAsia Philippine Patriots in the ABL in 2011.

Prior to the start of the 2012–13 PBA season, he then re-signed with the Alaska Aces for his second stint with the team. His veteran presence provided leadership to the young guns.

He was relegated to the reserved injured list for the entire 2013–14 season, and was placed in the dispersal pool at season's end. He was picked by Blackwater Elite during the 2014 PBA Expansion Draft.

== PBA career statistics ==
Legend
GP	Games played	MPG	Minutes per game
FG%	Field-goal percentage	3P%	3-point field-goal percentage	FT%	Free-throw percentage
RPG	Rebounds per game	APG	Assists per game	SPG	Steals per game
BPG	Blocks per game	PPG	Points per game	**Bold**	Career high

=== Season-by-season averages ===
Year	Team	GP	MPG	FG%	3P%	FT%	RPG	APG	SPG	BPG	PPG
2003	Shell	33	**23.4**	.456	.147	.766	**5.2**	**1.0**	.4	.3	**11.1**
2004–05	Purefoods	36	14.2	.417	.182	.667	2.9	.7	.3	**.4**	4.9
2005–06	Purefoods	6	2.8	.286	—	.000	.0	.0	.0	.0	.7
2005–06	Alaska	18	6.1	.324	—	.750	1.7	.7	.3	.2	1.8
2006–07	Alaska	**52**	13.6	**.474**	**.391**	**.789**	3.5	.8	.3	.3	5.5
2007–08	Alaska	29	8.1	.420	.368	.778	2.0	.3	.1	.2	3.1
2008–09	Rain or Shine	37	14.6	.377	.344	.766	3.5	.6	.4	.2	6.0
2009–10	Rain or Shine	45	15.8	.436	.328	.776	3.2	.5	.3	.3	6.0
2010–11	Powerade	17	12.0	.422	.389	.750	3.4	.6	.3	**.4**	4.3
2012–13	Alaska	11	3.1	.400	.000	—	.4	.0	.0	.0	1.1
2013–14	Alaska	1	1.0	.000	—	—	1.0	.0	.0	.0	.0
2014–15	Blackwater	32	18.9	.392	.273	.706	3.5	.8	**.5**	.3	4.8
2015–16	Mahindra	8	9.3	.276	.000	.500	1.6	.5	.4	**.4**	2.3
Career		325	13.9	.424	.317	.753	3.1	.6	.3	.3	5.2

== Coaching career ==
In November 2016, Laure formally ended his playing career in the PBA, after 13 years, to concentrate on his new job as the assistant coach of the UST Golden Tigresses women's varsity basketball team in the UAAP.

== Political career ==
In the 2022 local elections, Laure ran for a seat in the Sangguniang Bayan of the municipality of Katipunan, Zamboanga del Norte under the Partido Demokratiko Pilipino-Lakas ng Bayan or PDP-Laban. He won in the said election and served for one term from June 30, 2022 to June 30, 2025.

== Personal life ==
He and Jovie have two daughters, Ennajie (EJ) and Ejiya (Eya), and two sons, Echo and Fofo. Ennajie currently plays for the Nxled Chameleons in the Premier Volleyball League after she played for the Chery Tiggo Crossovers for two years, and Ejiya currently plays for the Alas Pilipinas Women's Volleyball Team. Their older son, Echo, plays for the UST Tiger Cubs.

Preceded by Rommel Adducul	MBA Most Valuable Player; 2001	Succeeded by None
