= Boyzie Zamar =

Filipino basketball coach

San Miguel Beermen
- Position: Assistant coach
- League: PBA

Personal information
- Born: December 30, 1966 (age 59)

Career information
- High school: CPU (Iloilo City)
- College: UE
- PBA draft: 1990: 4th round, 25th overall pick
- Drafted by: Alaska Air Force
- Coaching career: 1999–present

Career history

Coaching
- 1999–2001: Manila Metrostars (assistant)
- 2000: Manila Metrostars
- 2001: Soccsargen Marlins
- 2001–2003: UE
- 2001; 2005: Philippines
- 2012–2015: Cebuana Lhuillier Gems
- 2012–2013: UE
- 2014–present: San Miguel Beermen (assistant)
- 2021–2024: San Miguel Beermen 3x3

Career highlights
- As head coach: Filoil EcoOil Preseason Cup champion (2013); As assistant coach: 12× PBA champion (2014–15 Philippine, 2015 Governors', 2015–16 Philippine, 2016–17 Philippine, 2017 Commissioner's, 2017–18 Philippine, 2019 Philippine, 2019 Commissioner's, 2022 Philippine, 2023–24 Commissioner's, 2025 Philippine, 2025–26 Philippine); MBA champion (1999)
Medals
Men's basketball
Head Coach for Philippines
SEABA Championship
Gold medal – first place	2001 Manila	Team
SEA Games
Gold medal – first place	2001 Kuala Lumpur	Team

David "Boyzie" Zamar (sometimes misspelled as Boysie or Boycie) (born December 30, 1966) is a Filipino basketball coach who currently serves as an assistant coach of San Miguel Beermen. He is the father of former UE Red Warrior and former Beermen Paul Zamar.

== Career ==
Zamar worked as an assistant coach to Louie Alas at the Manila Metrostars, that time the team was led by their stars Rommel Adducul and future PBA coach Alex Compton. He was appointed as Philippine national team head coach, and led the team to gold medals in 2001 SEABA Championship and 2001 Southeast Asian Games.

He served as the head coach of Soccsargen Marlins. After the MBA folded in 2002, he later coached the then James Yap-led UE Red Warriors. They brought the team to the second seed and a final four appearance but was defeated by Ateneo. He coached the team until 2003.

He intended to once again coach the Philippine team in 2005 Southeast Asian Games, where the Philippines is also the host, but the team was suspended by FIBA.

He returned to coach UE once more and later became an assistant coach for the San Miguel Beermen He returned to head coaching on the Beermen's 3x3 team.

== Coaching record ==
=== Collegiate ===
Season	Team	Finish	W	L	PCT	PG	PW	PL	PPCT	Results
2001	UE	5th	7	7	.500	1	0	1	.000	4th seed playoffs
2002	UE	2nd	10	4	.714	2	0	2	.000	Semifinals
2003	UE	3rd	11	3	.786	1	0	1	.000	Semifinals
2012	UE	7th	2	5	.143	–	–	–	–	Eliminated
2013	UE	6th	7	7	.500	–	–	–	–	Eliminated
Totals			37	26	.587	3	0	3	.000	0 championship

Preceded by Angelito Esguerra	UE Red Warriors men's basketball head coach 2001-2003	Succeeded by Dindo Pumaren
Preceded by Jerry Codinera	UE Red Warriors men's basketball head coach 2012-2013	Succeeded by Derrick Pumaren
