= Tonichi Yturri =

Filipino basketball player and coach

Personal information
- Born: January 5, 1963 (age 63)
- Listed height: 6 ft 6 in (1.98 m)
- Listed weight: 185 lb (84 kg)

Career information
- College: De La Salle
- Playing career: 1989–1992
- Position: Center
- Number: 11
- Coaching career: 1999–2022

Career history

Playing
- 1986–1989: San Miguel Beermen
- 1990–1991: Pepsi Cola
- 1992: Ginebra San Miguel

Coaching
- 1997: Mobiline Phone Pals (assistant)
- 1999–2002: Cebu Gems
- 2002–2006: Cebuana Lhullier Gems
- 2006–2008: Talk 'N Text Phone Pals (assistant)
- 2004–2005: Benilde
- 2015–2022: Adamson (assistant)

Career highlights
- As player: 6× PBA champion (1987 Reinforced, 1988 Open, 1988 Reinforced, 1989 Open, 1989 All-Filipino, 1989 Reinforced); Grand Slam champion (1989)
Medals
Men's basketball
Representing Philippines
ABC Championship
Gold medal – first place	1985 Kuala Lumpur	Team
SEA Games
Gold medal – first place	1985 Bangkok	Team

Jose Antonio "Tonichi" Yturri (born January 5, 1963), is a retired Filipino professional basketball player and former collegiate coach.

== Career ==
=== Playing career ===
Yturri suited for De La Salle Green Archers, and played for the Northern Cement-Philippine national team and won a gold in 1985 ABC Championship in Kuala Lumpur, Malaysia. With him, the team composed of Allan Caidic, Samboy Lim, Hector Calma, Franz Pumaren, Yves Dignadice, Elmer Reyes, Alfie Almario, Jerry Codinera, Pido Jarencio, Benjie Gutierrez and naturalized players Jeff Moore and Dennis Still.

=== Coaching career ===
Yturri served as an assistant coach for Mobiline Phone Pals in 1997, but replaced when Norman Black was replaced. He served as head coach of Cebu Gems. They reached finals in 1999, but lost to Manila Metrostars led by Alex Compton and Rommel Adducul. He also coached in PBL team Cebuana Lhullier, and Benilde Blazers. He also served as an assistant coach for Talk 'N Text Phone Pals under Derrick Pumaren.

He also served as an assistant coach with former teammate and Derrick Pumaren's brother Franz at Adamson.

== Coaching record ==
Season	Team	GP	W	L	PCT	Finish	GP	W	L	PCT	Results
2005	Benilde	14	2	12	.143	8th	—	—	—	—	Eliminated
Totals		14	12	2	.143		0	0	0	.000	0 championships

== Acting ==
He appeared on a FPJ movie May Isang Tsuper ng Taxi.
