= Chris Tan =

Filipino retired basketball player and coach

Personal information
- Born: January 14, 1975 (age 51)
- Listed height: 6 ft 2 in (1.88 m)
- Listed weight: 199 lb (90 kg)

Career information
- College: De La Salle
- PBA draft: 2000:
- Playing career: 1998–2003
- Position: Guard
- Number: 1, 10
- Coaching career: 2017–2020

Career history

Playing
- 1998: Batangas Blades
- 1999: Cebu Gems
- 2000–2003: Sta. Lucia Realtors

Coaching
- 2017–2020: Meralco Bolts (assistant)

Career highlights
- As player: PBA champion (2001 Governors')

Christopher "Chris" Tan is a Filipino retired professional basketball player and coach.

== Career ==
A former De La Salle Green Archer, Tan played for Batangas Blades, Cebu Gems and Sta. Lucia Realtors.

In Realtors, he played under his step-father Norman Black.

Tan also served as an assistant to Black at Meralco Bolts from 2017 until 2020.

== Personal life ==
He is married to actress, TV host, beauty queen, comedienne, television personality, host and entrepreneur Sherilyn Reyes on December 17, 2003. His children include Ryle Paolo and Anya Sabrina.
