= Jeff Sanders =

American basketball player (born 1966)

Personal information
- Born: January 14, 1966 (age 60) Augusta, Georgia, U.S.
- Listed height: 6 ft 8 in (2.03 m)
- Listed weight: 225 lb (102 kg)

Career information
- High school: T. W. Josey (Augusta, Georgia)
- College: Georgia Southern (1985–1989)
- NBA draft: 1989: 1st round, 20th overall pick
- Drafted by: Chicago Bulls
- Playing career: 1989–2002
- Position: Small forward
- Number: 42, 20, 34

Career history
- 1989–1990: Chicago Bulls
- 1990–1991: Albany Patroons
- 1991: Charlotte Hornets
- 1991: Albany Patroons
- 1991–1992: Grand Rapids Hoops
- 1992: Fort Wayne Fury
- 1992: Atlanta Hawks
- 1992–1993: Grupo Libro Valladolid
- 1993–1994: Estudiantes Caja Postal
- 1994: Fort Wayne Fury
- 1994–1995: Teorematour Roma
- 1995: Baloncesto Salamanca
- 1995–1996: Fórum Filatélico
- 1996–1998: Kombassan Konya
- 1998–1999: Batangas Blades
- 1999–2000: Fenerbahçe
- 2000–2002: Rockford Lightning

Career highlights
- All-CBA First Team (2002); Metropolitan Basketball Association champion (1999); Metropolitan Basketball Association All-Star First-Team (1999); 2× TAAC Player of the Year (1988, 1989); 2× First-team All-TAAC (1988, 1989)
- Stats at NBA.com
- Stats at Basketball Reference

Jeffery Raynard Sanders (born January 14, 1966) is an American former professional basketball player who was selected by the Chicago Bulls in the first round (20th pick overall) of the 1989 NBA draft. Sanders played for the Bulls, Charlotte Hornets and Atlanta Hawks in four NBA seasons. In his NBA career, he appeared in 55 games and scored a total of 112 points. He played collegiately at Georgia Southern University. He also played for Fenerbahçe and Kombassan Konyaspor in Turkey.

He also appeared in the now defunct Metropolitan Basketball Association in the Philippines, as an import for the Batangas Blades, where he was listed as one of the league's top players. He also made an All-Star appearance for the 1998–1999 season and was a key contributor in the team's 1999 championship.

Sanders played for the Rockford Lightning of the Continental Basketball Association (CBA) during the 2001–02 season and was selected to the All-CBA First Team.

== Career statistics ==
Legend
GP	Games played	GS	Games started	MPG	Minutes per game
FG%	Field goal percentage	3P%	3-point field goal percentage	FT%	Free throw percentage
RPG	Rebounds per game	APG	Assists per game	SPG	Steals per game
BPG	Blocks per game	PPG	Points per game	**Bold**	Career high

=== NBA ===
Year	Team	GP	GS	MPG	FG%	3P%	FT%	RPG	APG	SPG	BPG	PPG
1989–90	Chicago	**31**	0	5.9	.325	–	.500	1.3	.3	.1	.1	.9
1990–91	Charlotte	3	0	**14.3**	.429	–	.500	**3.0**	.3	.3	**.3**	**4.3**
1991–92	Atlanta	12	0	9.8	**.444**	–	**.778**	2.2	.8	**.4**	**.3**	3.9
1992–93	Atlanta	9	0	13.3	.400	–	.500	.7	**.9**	.1	.1	2.7
Career		55	0	8.4	.395	.000	609	1.9	.5	.3	.2	2.0

==== Playoffs ====
Year	Team	GP	GS	MPG	FG%	3P%	FT%	RPG	APG	SPG	BPG	PPG
1989	Chicago	3	0	1.0	1.000	–	–	–	–	–	–	0.7
Career		3	0	1.0	1.000	.000	.000	.0	.0	.0	.0	0.7
