= Olongapo Volunteers =

- Leagues: MBA (2002)
- Founded: 2002
- History: Olongapo Volunteers/Gilbey's-Olongapo Volunteers; 2002
- Location: Olongapo City, Zambales, Philippines
- Team colors: red and white, blue, yellow and white
- Head coach: Junel Baculi

The Olongapo Volunteers were a professional basketball team in the Metropolitan Basketball Association in 2002. In its only season in the league, the Volunteers made the semifinals of the tournament.

== History ==
In 2002, the Olongapo Volunteers became the eighth member of the MBA after the departure of the Nueva Ecija Patriots. The team was managed by Mayor Katherine Gordon and later, by Senator Richard Gordon.

Junel Baculi, who steered Hapee Toothpaste and Welcoat to PBL titles was hired as the head coach and nabbed several former PBA veterans such as Johnadel Cardel, Joel Dualan, Henry Fernandez as well as former PBL veterans Eugene Tan, Kerwin McCoy, Brixter Encarnacion and Calijohn Orfecio. Fil-am Jeff Flowers was also signed by the expansion ballclub.

In the MBA First Conference, Olongapo held the best record in the Northern Conference with a 7–3 record, and a home game in the semifinals against the LBC-Batangas Blades. However, the Blades escaped with a 76–75 victory to advance to the championship round against the eventual champions the RCPI-Negros Slashers.

Olongapo was renamed as the Gilbey's-Olongapo Volunteers, but the league folded in the middle of the second conference.

== Roster ==
- Bob Allen
- Jerome Barbosa
- Johnedel Cardel
- Joel Dualan
- Brixter Encarnacion
- Henry Fernandez
- Jeffrey Flowers
- Julius Gonzales
- Bernard Gozon
- Kerwin McCoy
- Calijohn Orfrecio
- Allen Glenn Patrimonio
- Topex Robinson
- Eugene Tan
- Ricky Vinoya
