= Metropolitan Basketball Association =

Defunct professional basketball league in the Philippines (1998–2002)

- Most recent season or competition: 2002 MBA Season
- Sport: Basketball
- Founded: March 7, 1998; 28 years ago
- Folded: July 26, 2002; 24 years ago
- Commissioner: Ramon Fernandez (first); Chito Loyzaga (last)
- No. of teams: 16 (total)
- Country: Philippines
- Last champions: RCPI-Negros Slashers (1st title)
- Most titles: 5 teams (1 title each)
- Broadcasters: ABS-CBN; NBN

The Metropolitan Basketball Association (MBA), also shortened as Metroball, was a professional basketball league in the Philippines that ran for five seasons from 1998 until 2002.

The MBA was established to rival the Philippine Basketball Association (PBA). The MBA contained between 8 and 15 teams which represented cities and provinces who played at home and away. Initially, the league was divided into two conferences: the Northern Conference for teams based in Luzon and the Southern Conference for teams based in Visayas and Mindanao. At the end of each season, the champions of each conference faced each other at the MBA National Finals to determine the league champion. Later, the MBA allowed companies to sponsor teams and attach their brand to the teams' names—and by the final season, used a three-conference format. The MBA's rules also differed slightly from the basic rules of basketball.

Each of the five seasons had a different champion: the Pampanga Dragons, Manila Metrostars, San Juan Knights, Batangas Blades, and Negros Slashers. The Negros Slashers had the most finals appearances, with four. The Northern Conference produced the most champions, with four, while the Southern Conference produced only one. A total of sixteen teams have competed in the MBA.

MBA games were broadcast on ABS-CBN Corporation's television networks from 1998 until 2001 when it moved to the state-run NBN-4 under the production of Silverstar Communications. The MBA folded in July 2002 due to high costs of maintaining the league and ABS-CBN's withdrawal of support.

== History ==
The MBA played its first game on March 7, 1998, at the Don Narciso Ramos Sports Complex in Lingayen, Pangasinan. The MBA was widely viewed as broadcast giant ABS-CBN's attempt to undermine the Philippine Basketball Association (PBA) after failing on its bid to acquire broadcasting rights for the 1998 season. Prior to the start of the MBA's inaugural season, the league had successfully poached PBA free agents for talent in order to compete.

Metroball allowed foreigners to play for their teams, not requiring Philippine passports of them, nor requiring those foreigners to have Filipino blood. All the league required was that these players be born in the Philippines.

As a direct result of this practice, the MBA and its foreign-born players began attracting attention away from the PBA, forcing the more-established league to escalate their own players' salaries and practically sidelining its rookie draft through a "direct hiring" process of foreign citizens with Filipino descent which the elder league approved in the 1998 off-season. This allowed PBA teams like the Mobiline Phone Pals and Tanduay Rhum Masters to negotiate directly with MBA players or prospects (like Asi Taulava and Sonny Alvarado) for their services.

The MBA folded on July 26, 2002, due to high expenses of funding a regional basketball league, and ABS-CBN withdrawing its funding for the league. In its immediate aftermath, the displaced players went to the semi-professional Philippine Basketball League en route to the PBA.

== Format ==
The MBA had a format similar to that of North America's National Basketball Association (NBA). The teams were divided into two conferences: the Northern Conference composed of Luzon-based teams, and the Southern Conference composed of Visayas- and Mindanao-based teams. The season concluded with the MBA National Finals, where the champions of both conferences face off to determine the season champions.

After the league adapted a semi-commercial format, in which teams are sponsored by companies, several methods were used to in determining the champion. In their final season, they have adapted a three-conference format, similar with the PBA.

== Teams ==
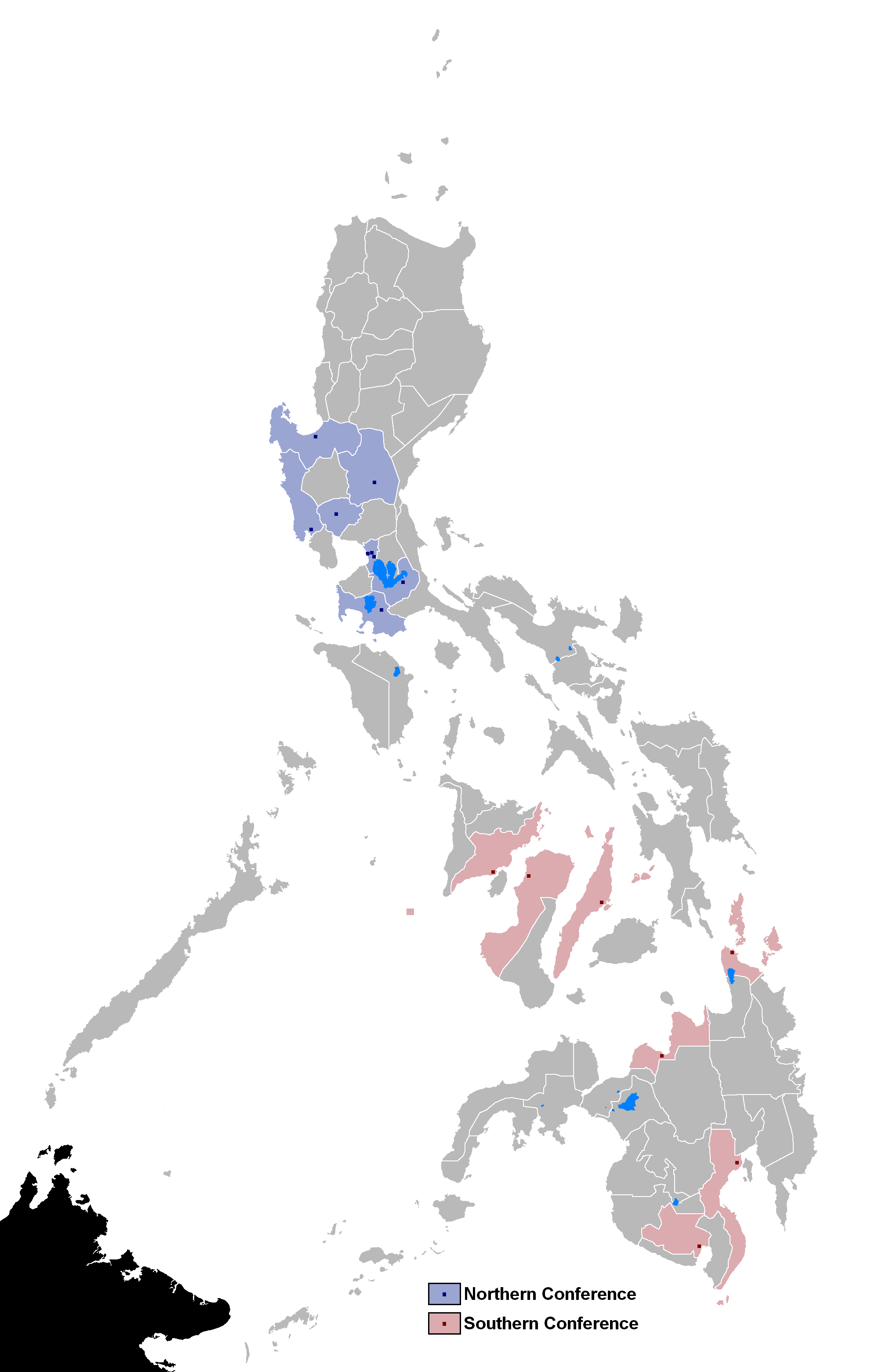
Location of the teams.

=== Northern Conference ===
- Batangas Blades (1998–2002; team merged with Manila in 2001, known as LBC-Batangas Blades)
- Laguna Lakers (1998–2001; team abandoned the league after their owners FedEx joined the PBA in 2002)
- Manila Metrostars (1998–2001; team merged with Batangas in 2001)
- Nueva Ecija Patriots (1999–2001)
- Olongapo Volunteers (2002) (team renamed as Gilbey's-Olongapo Volunteers in 2002)
- Pampanga Dragons (also known as Pampanga Stars) (1998–2000; 2002)
- Pangasinan Waves (also known as Pangasinan Presidents) (1998–1999; 2002)
- Pasig-Rizal Pirates (1998–2000) (also known as Pasig Blue Pirates in 1998)
- San Juan Knights (1999–2001) (team renamed as Andok's-San Juan Knights in 2001)

=== Southern Conference ===
- Cebu Gems (1998–2002; team renamed as the Cebuana Lhullier Gems in 2001)
- Davao Eagles (1998–2002)(TPG /Professional Davao Eagles) (2002)
- Cagayan de Oro Amigos (also known as Cagayan de Oro Nuggets) (1998–2000; 2002)
- Iloilo Megavoltz (also known as Iloilo Volts) (1998–2000)
- Negros Slashers (Bacolod) (1998–2002; team renamed as the RCPI-Negros Slashers in 2002)
- SocSarGen Marlins (1998–2001; team renamed as the Socsargen-Taguig Marlins in 2001 when the team relocated to Taguig)
- Surigao Miners/Warriors (1999–2000)

Teams	1998	1999	2000	2001	2002
Batangas Blades / LBC-Batangas Blades	✓	✓	✓	✓	✓
Cagayan de Oro Nuggets/Amigos / Casino-CDO Amigos	✓	✓	✓		✓
Cebu Gems / Cebuana Lhuillier Gems	✓	✓	✓	✓	✓
Davao Eagles / Professional Davao Eagles	✓	✓	✓	✓	✓
Iloilo Volts/Megavoltz	✓	✓	✓		
Laguna Lakers / FedEx-Laguna Lakers	✓	✓	✓	✓	
Manila Metrostars / LBC-Manila Metrostars	✓	✓	✓		
Negros Slashers / RCPI-Negros Slashers	✓	✓	✓	✓	✓
Nueva Ecija Patriots		✓	✓	✓	
Gilbey's-Olongapo Volunteers					✓
Pampanga Dragons / Sunkist-Pampanga Stars	✓	✓	✓		✓
Pangasinan Presidents / Osaka Pangasinan Waves	✓	✓			✓
Pasig Blue Pirates/Pasig-Rizal Pirates	✓	✓	✓		
San Juan Knights / Andok's-San Juan Knights		✓	✓	✓	
SocSarGen Marlins / Taguig Marlins	✓	✓	✓	✓	
Surigao Miners/Warriors		✓	✓		

== Involvement with the national team ==
During its existence, the MBA lent some players or teams to represent the country in various regional competitions.

- 1998 — Pangasinan Presidents – 1998 ABC Champions Cup Malaysia.
- 1999 — Manila Metrostars – 1999 SEA Games Brunei.
- 1999 — Laguna Lakers – FIBA Asia Cup Japan.
- 1999 — Iloilo Megavolts – William Jones Cup.
- 1999 — Pasig-Rizal Pirates – 1999 ABC Champions Cup Lebanon.
- 2000 — Laguna Lakers – William Jones Cup.
- 2001 — FedEx-Laguna Lakers – William Jones Cup.
- 2001 — MBA Dream Team – SEABA Championship and 2001 SEA Games Malaysia.
- 2002 — MBA All Star – William Jones Cup.

== Coaches ==
- Louie Alas (Manila, 1999)
- Junel Baculi (Olongapo, 2002)
- Joel Banal (Pasig-Rizal, 1998–2000)
- Rolly Buenaflor (Negros, 1998)
- Philip Cezar (San Juan, 1999–2001)
- Chot Reyes (Pangasinan, 1998–1999)
- Lawrence Chongson (Pangasinan, 2002)
- Ricky Dandan (Manila, 1998)
- Aric del Rosario (Pampanga, 1998–1999)
- Binky Favis (Batangas, 1998–1999)
- Bonnie Garcia (Laguna, 1998–1999, 2001 / Pampanga, 2000)
- Danny Gavieres (Iloilo, 1999–2000)
- Willie Generalao (Socsargen, 2000)
- Bong Go (Davao, 2002)
- Jimmy Mariano (Surigao, 2000)
- Jun Noel (Negros, 1998–1999 / Davao, 2001)
- Nash Racela (Batangas, 2000–2002)
- Bong Ramos (Batangas, 2000)
- Biboy Ravanes (Socsargen, 1998–1999)
- Chot Reyes (Pangasinan, 1999)
- Mike Reyes (Iloilo, 1998)
- Arlene Rodriguez (Cagayan de Oro, 1999)
- Francis Rodriguez (Davao, 1998–2000)
- Robert Sison (Pangasinan, 1999 / Negros, 2000–2001)
- Leoncio Tan Jr. (Cebu, 1998)
- Joe Lipa (Nueva Ecija, 1999–2001)
- Allan Trinidad (Nueva Ecija, 2000 / Pampanga, 2002)
- Dong Vergeire (Pangasinan, 1998)
- Jojo Villa (Nueva Ecija, 2000)
- Jojo Villapando (Negros, 2002)
- Nemie Villegas (Nueva Ecija, 2000)
- Vic Ycasiano (Cagayan de Oro, 2002)
- Tonichi Yturri (Cebu, 1998–2002)
- David Zamar (Cagayan de Oro, 1998–1999 / Manila, 2000)

== Venues ==
- Araullo University Centrum-Cabanatuan
- Blue Eagle Gym
- Cebu Coliseum
- CEU Centrodome
- Centrum in De La Salle-Lipa
- General Santos City Gym
- Mail & More Complex-San Andres
- Mandaue City Sports Complex
- Mindanao Polytechnic State College-CDO
- Narciso Ramos Sports Complex
- Calasiao Sports Complex
- Dagupan City People's Astrodome
- De Venecia Sports Complex, San Fabian, Pangasinan
- Pampanga Convention Center
- Pasig Sports Complex
- Philsports Arena
- Rizal Memorial Coliseum
- Rizal Memorial College Stadium
- San Fernando Sports Complex
- San Juan Gym
- San Luis Sports Complex
- Tinga Gym-Taguig
- University of San Agustin Gym-Iloilo city
- University of St. La Salle Gym-Bacolod
- Urios Gym-Butuan
- Ynares Center

== Rules ==
The MBA generally followed the basic rules of basketball but had a set of its differences compared to the PBA:

1. The shot clock was reduced to 23 seconds, as opposed to the NBA and PBA's 24 seconds.
2. The time limit for a team to advance the ball over the center line was reduced to eight seconds, as opposed to both the NBA and PBA's 10 seconds. The PBA later adopted the 8-second limit in 2004, two years after the MBA disbanded.
3. Free-three – An option to trade a player's two free throws for a free three (one attempt at the three-point arc above the free throw line, worth three points if successfully made) at the last two minutes of the fourth quarter. This option was later made available at any time during the game by 1999.
4. One-for-one situation – There were two penalty situations in the MBA: first, if a squad incurs five team fouls, the fouled player needed to successfully make the first free throw before getting the second. Two free throws were only guaranteed to a player fouled in the act of shooting if a squad incurred seven team fouls or more.
5. Blitz Three – Introduced in 2001, any field goal converted within four seconds of a change of possession was worth three points. A red siren is installed at the backboard to indicate the Blitz Period.
6. Foreigners were allowed to play in the league, provided that the player is born in the Philippines.

== MBA Most Valuable Players ==
Season	Player	Team	College
1998	John Ferriols	Negros	USJ-R
1999	Alex Compton	Manila	Cornell
2000	Rommel Adducul	Manila	SSC-R
2001	Eddie Laure	LBC-Batangas	Adamson

== MBA Champions ==
Teams in bold won the MBA National Championship.

Season	Northern Conference	Southern Conference	Series
1998	**Pampanga Dragons**	Negros Slashers	4–1
1999	**Manila Metrostars**	Cebu Gems	4–2
2000	**San Juan Knights**	Negros Slashers	4–2
2001 First Phase	**Andok's-San Juan Knights**	Negros Slashers	3-1
2001 Second Phase	**LBC-Batangas Blades**	Negros Slashers	3–1
2002	LBC-Batangas Blades	**RCPI-Negros Slashers**	0–3

- October 31, 1998: Pampanga Dragons emerge as the first MBA champions, winning against Negros Slashers in five games. The Dragons clinch the national championship following an 89–85 victory in Game Five at the San Fernando Sports Complex.
- December 8, 1999: Manila Metrostars rout the Cebu Gems, 101–83 in Game Six, before a hometown crowd at the Mail & More Sports Complex in San Andres and crowned themselves the 1999 MBA national champions.
- November 25, 2000: San Juan Knights defeated Negros Slashers, 104–91 in Game Six, at the packed San Juan Gym for their first MBA national title since becoming one of the three new teams last season.
- August 24, 2001: Andok's-San Juan is champions anew in the MBA first phase tournament, scoring a 3-1 series win over Negros Slashers, the same team they beat in the national finals last year. The Knights outscored the Slashers, 30-15 in the final quarter, for a 103-90 victory.
- December 19, 2001: LBC-Batangas Blades captured their first MBA crown in the second phase of the 2001 season, beating hard-luck Negros Slashers, 94–75 in Game Four, for a 3–1 series victory.
- June 1, 2002: After four runner-up finishes, RCPI-Negros finally win their first MBA title. The Slashers completed a three-game sweep off LBC-Batangas Blades. Winning Slashers coach Jojo Villapando now joined the elite list of MBA champion coaches.

== Commissioners ==
- Ramon Fernandez (1998–1999)
- Gregorio "Ogie" Narvasa II (2000–2001)
- Severino "Butch" Antonio (2001)
- Joaquin "Chito" Loyzaga (2002)

== Rivalries ==
- Manila-Cebu – Seen as a rivalry of two basketball hotbeds in the Philippines. Both teams played the first MBA game on March 7, 1998, in Pangasinan with Metrostars defeating the Gems. Manila and Cebu also entangled in a regular season match in August 1999 which saw Manila escape with a nail-biting win that preserved their record 23-game winning streak. Manila later defeated Cebu in the 1999 MBA National Finals. Cebu bounced back, defeating Manila to win the 2000 MBA Interconference tournament.
- Negros-Cebu – A rivalry of both teams from the Visayas region, and also in the MBA Visayas Division. The Slashers defeated the Gems 4–3 in the 1998 MBA Southern Conference Finals, after Negros trailed 1–3 in the series. The Gems bounced back in the 1999 Southern Conference semis by defeating the Slashers. A game during the series was halted and restarted a week later, due to physical play and fan behavior. Negros bounced back in 2000, defeating Cebu in the Southern finals.
- Davao-Cebu – A Southern Conference rivalry, had a game in 1998 halted due to physical play while fans pelted the court with debris.
- Pasig-San Juan – A Northern Conference rivalry between both nearby Metro Manila cities. Probably the most intense rivalry in MBA history, with games being halted with fights from both players on the court and rival fans in attendance. Pasig-Rizal defeated San Juan to win the 1999 MBA Northern Conference Two title and also eliminated the Knights in the 1999 Northern Conference semifinals.

== Trivia ==
- The Manila Metrostars set a league record in 1999 by winning 22 consecutive games only to be halted by the Negros Slashers during the elimination round, en route to a 26–4 record and the MBA National Championship. The record was also seen by many as the most in Philippine professional basketball history, breaking the PBA's Crispa Redmanizers' record of 21 consecutive victories in 1983.
- 8-second rule, standard in professional and original used of MBA started in 1998.
- Felix Belano of the Davao Eagles was the only player to record a quadruple-double in MBA history (if a player records a double-figure numbers in four categories such as points, rebounds, assists, blocks or steals) during a game against the Nueva Ecija Patriots in 1999. Belano later had a stint with the Talk 'N Text Phone Pals of the PBA.
- Peter Martin made the first shot in the history of the MBA when his Manila Metrostars they faced the Cebu Gems in the opening of the league in 1998.
- Chris Clay of Laguna Lakers was holds of 19/19 free throw in 2001 season.
- The SocSarGen Marlins became the first team to register a win in the first double-header of the league in 1998. Max Delantes led the way for the Marlins.
- Stephen Padilla holds the record for most 3-point shots made with 10 as he scores 40 points with a 10/10 from the 3-point arc in 2001.
- John Ferriols was the first MVP of the tournament while Alex Compton was the first American player to be named MVP of the MBA in 1999.
- In 1999, the Manila Metrostars became the first MBA team to banner a team at the 1999 Southeast Asian Games in Brunei. They made it before winning the national championship over the Cebu Gems. Coach Louie Alas led the RP Team (now Team Gilas Pilipinas) to win the gold medal by beating Thailand. The majority of the line-up were the players from the Metrostars led by Adducul and Camaso and recruited some players from other teams.
- The Pasig Pirates and San Juan Knights were revived as expansion teams of the Manny Pacquiao-founded Maharlika Pilipinas Basketball League (MPBL) in 2018. A year later in 2019, the SocSarGen Marlins were rechristened as the Soccsksargen Marlins, later renamed as the Sarangani Marlins.

== Media coverage ==
Metropolitan Basketball Association
- Country of origin: Philippines
- Original languages: Filipino; English

Production
- Camera setup: Multiple-camera setup
- Running time: 150 minutes+
- Production companies: ABS-CBN Sports; ABS-CBN Regional Network Group (1998-2001); Silverstar Communications (2002)

Original release
- Network: ABS-CBN (Finals only); Studio 23 (now S+A); Sarimanok News Network (now ABS-CBN News Channel); PTV/NBN; The Filipino Channel (Internationally)
- Release: March 7, 1998 – July 26, 2002

The MBA on ABS-CBN was a branding for presentation of the Metropolitan Basketball Association games by the ABS-CBN Sports. The MBA on ABS-CBN premiered on March 7, 1998, when the league inaugurated its first season, and ended on December 19, 2001.

State-owned NBN-4 officially took over the coverage in the ill-fated 2002 season with the game telecasts being produced by Silverstar Communications.

=== Commentators ===
==== Play-by-play ====
- Mico Halili (1998–2001)
- Sev Sarmenta (1998–2002)
- Bill Velasco (1998–2002)
- Bob Novales (1998–2001)
- Jimmy Javier (2002)
- Noel Zarate (2002)

==== Color ====
- Butch Maniego (1998–2002)
- Freddie Webb (1998–2001)
- Danny Francisco (1998–2002)
- Chot Reyes (1998)
- Edwin Khu (1999)
- Binky Favis (1999)
- Randy Sacdalan (2000–2002)
- Mark Molina (2000–2001)
- Vic Ycasiano (2002)

==== Courtside reporters ====
- Mico Halili (1998)
- Bobby Yan (1998–2001)
- Alex Santos (1998–2001)
- Ira Panganiban (1998–2001)
- Pia Gonzales (1998–2001)
- Joseph Barrios (1998)
- Lexi Schulze (1999–2001)
- Trisha Heslet (2000–2001)
- Pia Arcangel (2001)
- George Rocha (2001–2002)
- JC Gonzales (2000–2001)
- Dyan Castillejo (1998–2000)
- Ria Tanjuatco-Trillo (1999–2001)
- TJ Manotoc (2000)

== See also ==
- Maharlika Pilipinas Basketball League
