= Peter Martin (basketball) =

Filipino former basketball player and coach

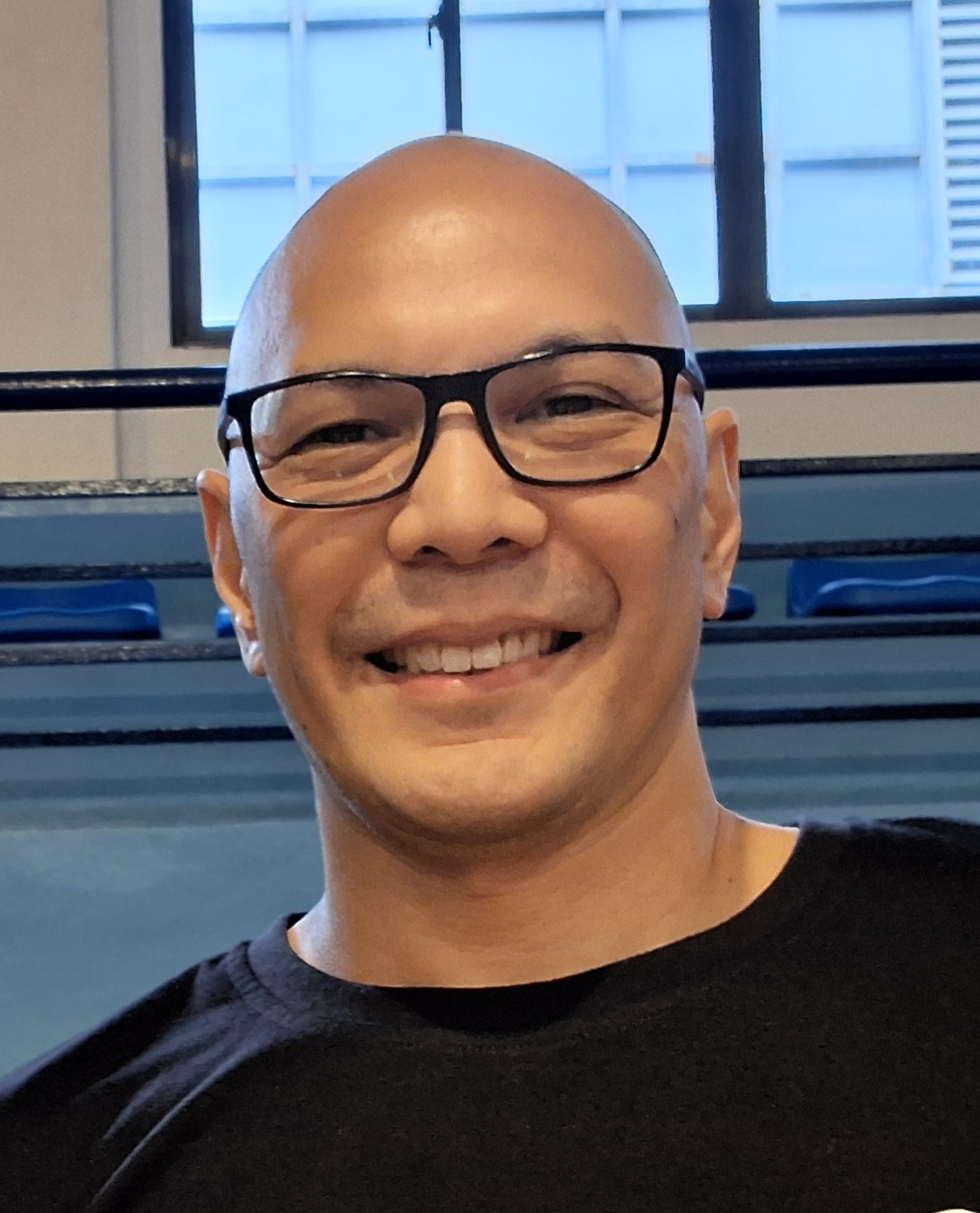
- Martin in 2026

San Miguel Beermen
- Title: Assistant coach
- League: PBA

Personal information
- Born: November 8, 1968 (age 58)
- Listed height: 6 ft 3 in (1.91 m)
- Listed weight: 200 lb (91 kg)

Career information
- College: San Sebastian
- PBA draft: 1996: 1st round, 6th overall pick
- Drafted by: Pepsi Mega
- Playing career: 1996–2001
- Position: Small forward / Power forward
- Number: 21, 45
- Coaching career: 2012–present

Career history

Playing
- 1996–1997: Mobilne Phone Pals
- 1997: Pop Cola 800s
- 1998–2000: Manila Metrostars
- 2001: Batangas Blades

Coaching
- 2012–2013: San Miguel Beermen (ABL) (assistant)
- 2014–present: San Miguel Beermen (assistant)
- 2024–present: UST (assistant)

Career highlights
- As player: MBA champion (1999, 2001); As assistant coach: 12× PBA champion (2014–15 Philippine, 2015 Governors', 2015–16 Philippine, 2016–17 Philippine, 2017 Commissioner's, 2017–18 Philippine, 2019 Philippine, 2019 Commissioner's, 2022 Philippine, 2023–24 Commissioner's, 2025 Philippine, 2025–26 Philippine); ABL champion (2013)

Peter Martin (born November 8, 1968) is a Filipino former basketball player and coach currently serving for San Miguel Beermen.

== Career ==
=== Playing ===
Martin played for San Sebastian Stags in college, and in professional teams like Mobiline Phone Pals, Pop Cola, and Manila Metrostars.

=== Coaching ===
Martin was hired as an assistant coach of San Miguel Beermen in 2014. He was assigned as lead assistant when Leo Austria was appointed as head coach.

In 2024, he was hired by UST Growling Tigers as their assistant coach.

== Personal life ==
In 2021, he suffered a torn Achilles tendon and underwent surgery.
