= Gabby Cui =

Filipino basketball player and executive (born 1973)

Personal information
- Born: May 20, 1973 (age 53)
- Listed height: 6 ft 4 in (1.93 m)
- Listed weight: 210 lb (95 kg)

Career information
- College: Ateneo
- PBA draft: 1997: 1st round, 6th overall pick
- Drafted by: Sta. Lucia Realtors
- Playing career: 1997–2002
- Position: Center / Power forward
- Number: 81

Career history
- 1997: Sta. Lucia Realtors
- 1998; 2000–2002: Mobiline Phone Pals
- 1999–2000: Pampanga Dragons

Career highlights
- As player: PBA champion (1998 PBA Centennial Cup); As executive: PBA champion (2021 Philippine)

Gabriel Marco Cui (born May 20, 1973) is a Filipino basketball player and executive who formerly served as the manager of TNT Tropang Giga.

== Career ==
Cui played for Sta. Lucia Realtors, Mobiline Phone Pals, and Pampanga Dragons.

Cui served as the team manager of TNT Tropang Giga from 2019. He returned to corporate work at PLDT in 2022, and was replaced by Jojo Lastimosa. He also served as the manager of Philippine national basketball team in 2019.
