= Adriano Go =

Filipino basketball coach

Bong Go
Personal information
- Born: May 8, 1950
- Died: December 26, 2016 (aged 66)
- Coaching career: 1974–2016

Career history

Coaching
- 1974–1975: Ateneo de Davao
- 1975–1977: Ateneo (assistant)
- 1975–1976: Philippines under 19 (assistant)
- 1977: Philippines (assistant)
- 1978–1979: Ateneo de Davao
- 1980–1981: Galleon Shippers (assistant)
- 1984–1985: Taraji Sports Club
- 1987–1992: Great Taste Coffee Makers (assistant)
- 1989: Presto Ice Cream (interim)
- 1993–1994: Swift Mighty Meaty (assistant)
- 1994–1997: Mobiline Phone Pals (assistant)
- 1994–1996: Perpetual
- 1998: Purefoods Tender Juicy Hotdogs (assistant)
- 1998–1999: Benilde
- 1999–2002: Talk 'N Phone Pals (assistant)
- 2002: Davao Eagles
- 2002: Ateneo de Davao HS (women)
- 2003–2004: Montana Pawnshop
- 2003–2005: Philippines (under-19)
- 2005–2008: Makati Hope HS

Career highlights
- As head coach: National Intercollegiate Basketball champion (1974); Jubli-Perak Cup champion (1992); As assistant coach: 3× PBA champion (1987 All-Filipino, 1990 All-Filipino, 1993 Commissioner's Cup); 2× NCAA men's champion (1975, 1976)

Adriano "Bong" Go (May 8, 1950 – December 26, 2016) was a Filipino basketball coach.

== Career ==
Go started his career at Ateneo de Davao's basketball team. He also served as assistant coach for Ateneo de Manila Blue Eagles basketball, Philippines national youth basketball team, Philippine seniors basketball team, Galleon Shippers, Great Taste Coffee Makers, Swift Mighty Meaty, Purefoods Tender Juicy Hotdogs, and Talk 'N Text Phone Pals. He served as head coach for Taraji Sports Club in Saudi Arabia, Perpetual Help Rizal, Benilde Blazers, Davao Eagles, Ateneo de Davao's girl's high school team, Montana Pawnshop in PBL, Philippine Youth Team and Makati Hope high school team.

== Death ==
Go died of stroke on December 26, 2016.
