= Davao Eagles =

- Leagues: MBA (1998-2002)
- Founded: 1998
- History: Davao Eagles; 1998–2001; TPG /Professional Davao Eagles; 2001-2002
- Arena: Rizal Memorial College Stadium
- Location: Davao City
- Team colors
- Head coach: Francis Rodriguez; Jun Noel; Bong Go

The Davao Eagles were a professional basketball team of the now-defunct Metropolitan Basketball Association from 1998 to 2002. The team was owned by Anthony del Rosario. The ballclub choose to be named 'Eagles' because the city is the home of the Philippine Eagle. In the MBA's final two years, the team became known as TPG-Davao or Professional Davao Eagles.

== History ==
=== First season ===
The Eagles were handled by former national team coach Francis Rodriguez. The players includes Rodriguez' former wards at San Sebastian College during the 1980s; Eugene Quilban, Allan Garrido, Melchor Teves and Armoni Llagas. Two players, Rafael Santos and Jomar Tierra, were with Rodriguez' UE Warriors, while Lou Regidor and Aldrin Barola were under Rodriguez at Oriental Battery in the Philippine Basketball League.

Davao started out the inaugural season with five straight victories, with three of its wins, two by buzzer beaters and one via overtime against Manila, 90–86. The Eagles stunned Batangas Blades, 84–83, on the last second triple by Rafael Santos, and pulled an 82–80 win over Pasig Blue Pirates on Eugene Quilban's last second triple.

The team finished with the best record in the Southern Conference during the regular season with 14 wins as against eight losses.

=== Next two seasons (1999-2000) ===
In 1999, during the pre-season, the Eagles no longer had Eugene Quilban in the lineup as he had joined Sta. Lucia Realtors in the PBA. Filling in his shoes was one-time PBL's Most Valuable Player Bong Marata. Helping out Marata in the playing chores was Cebuano cager Felix Belano, who played for Chowking in the PBL last season and was actually drafted by Purefoods in the PBA's annual draft but failed to make it to the team's roster.

On June 2, 1999, the Davao Eagles were crowned the Southern Conference Mindanao division champions following a smashing 89-75 conquest of SocSarGen Marlins at the RMC gym.

In the MBA's third season in 2000, Davao finished second and a game behind Cebu Gems in the Southern Conference with nine wins and three losses. Davao were swept by Negros Slashers in the best-of-three semifinal series.

=== Final two years (2001-2002) ===
On October 1, 2001, the team entered a partnership with The Professionals Group (TPG). The deal is similar to other mergers of MBA teams and their corporate sponsors. Under coach Jun Noel, Davao ended up with 3 wins and 11 losses in the 2001 MBA first phase conference. The Eagles finished with four wins and ten losses in the second phase and were swept in two games by the Cebuana Lhuillier Gems in the semifinals.

== Roster lists (1998-2002) ==
- Peter Aguilar
- Cris Bade
- Aldrin Barola
- Donbel Belano
- Arvin Bonleon
- Richie Cabrera
- Chris De Jesus
- Jonjit Duremdes
- Allan Garrido
- Paul Guerrero
- Egay Ignacio
- Armoni Llagas
- Randy Lopez
- Billy Mamaril
- Mike Manigo
- Romulo Marata
- Jun Paguinto
- Marlon Piodo
- Eugene Quilban
- Lou Regidor
- Jondan Salvador
- Rafael Santos
- Genesis Sasuman
- Peter June Simon
- Stevenson Solomon
- Melchor Teves
- Jomar Tierra
- Ariel Tizon
- Cid White
- Glenn Peter Yap
- Dennis Concha
