= Pampanga Dragons =

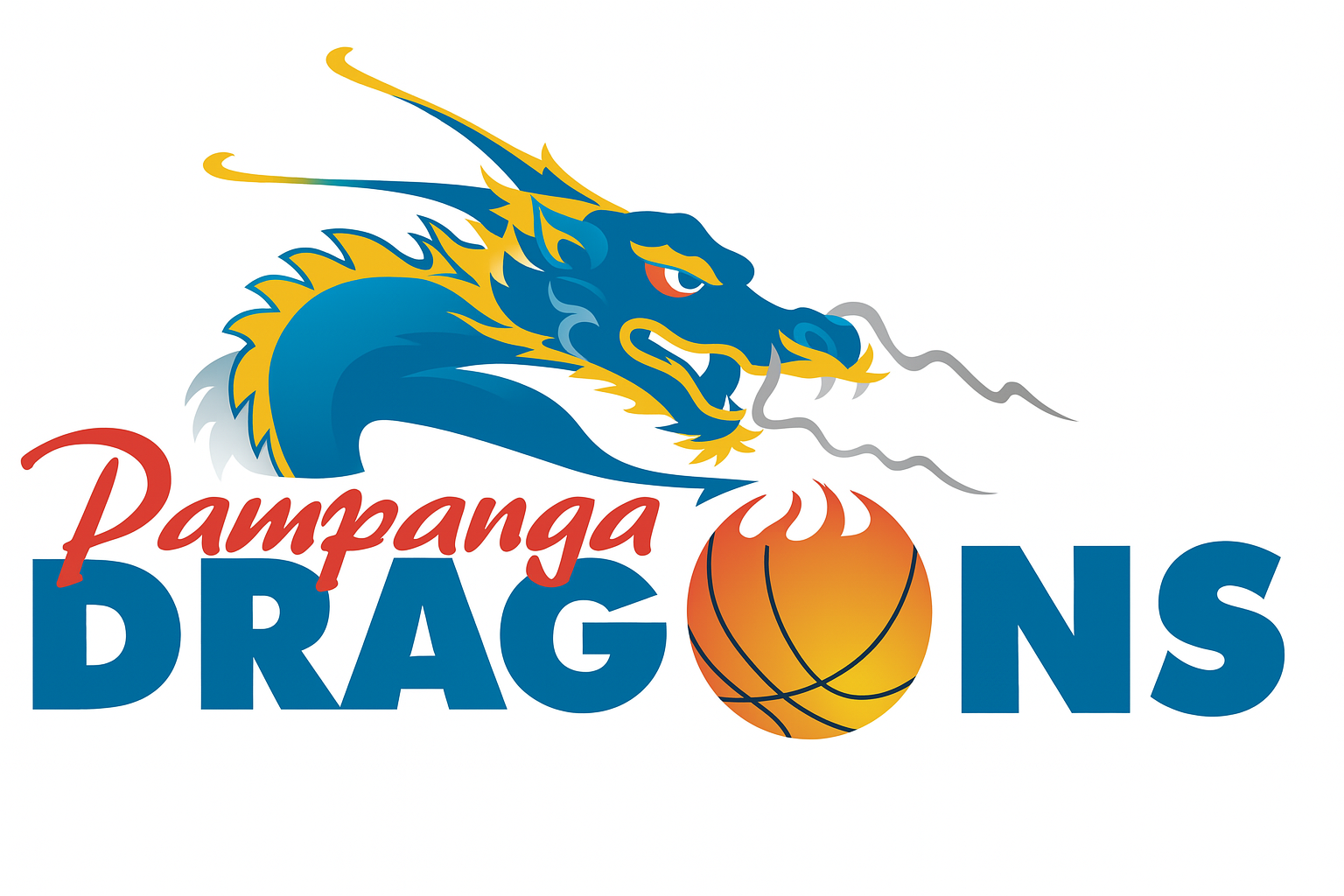
- Leagues: MBA (1998-2002)
- Founded: 1998
- History: Pampanga Dragons; 1998–2000; Pampanga Stars; 2002
- Arena: San Fernando Sports Complex; Pampanga Convention Center
- Location: San Fernando, Pampanga
- Team colors
- Head coach: Aric del Rosario
- Championships: 1 MBA National Championship

The Pampanga Dragons were a professional basketball team of the now-defunct Metropolitan Basketball Association from 1998 to 2000 and in 2002 as Pampanga Stars. The team was owned by Jose Antonio Gonzales II and was named Dragons because the father and son pair of Tony and Anton Gonzales owned Mondragon Industries.

== History ==
The Pampanga Dragons took early leadership during the infant stage of the Metropolitan league, winning their first four games with Ato Agustin, a one-time PBA Most Valuable Player, averaging 25.2 points per game in their four straight victories before a sprain ankle kept him out in the Dragons' 73-78 loss to Manila Metrostars prior to the Holy Week break for their first loss in five games.

=== First league champion ===
The Pampanga Dragons were the first MBA national champions in the inaugural season in 1998, the Dragons defeated the Negros Slashers, four games to one, in the national finals. Ato Agustin's two charities with only three seconds to go, sealed an 89-85 victory in Game five. Among the rosters in the champion team of coach Aric del Rosario, aside from Agustin, were Gherome Ejercito, Ato Morano, Udoy Belmonte, Andy de Guzman, Norman Gonzales, 6-5 Angelo David and 6-foot-4 bruiser Dave Bautista.

=== Next two seasons (1999-2000) ===
Though Pampanga acquired the services of PBA's "Mr. Excitement" Bong Alvarez in 1999 it lost some key players during the off-season: Bryant Punzalan (to SocSarGen Marlins), Norman Gonzales (to Cagayan de Oro Amigos), and Gherome Ejercito to new team (San Juan Knights). The team also lost Ato Agustin as he went back to the PBA playing for Sta. Lucia Realtors. The Dragons fell to hard times during the 2000 MBA season, forcing Dragons owner Anton Gonzales to file a leave of absence beginning the following year.

=== Return as Pampanga Stars in 2002 ===
They make a comeback in the 2002 MBA season as Sunkist-Pampanga Stars, this time under coach Allan Trinidad

== Roster lists ==
- Angelo "Noliboy" Pangan (RIP)
- Ariel L. Reyes
- Renato Agustin
- Paul Alvarez
- Ernesto Ballesteros
- Billy Bansil
- Dave Bautista
- Rudolf Belmonte
- Celino Cruz
- Gabby Cui
- Angelo David
- Andy de Guzman
- Jonathan de Guzman
- Lester del Rosario
- Gherome Ejercito
- Ariel Garcia
- Junel Mendiola
- Rolof Liangco
- Renato Morano
- Aldrin Morante
- Mar Morelos
- Michael Otto
- Roland Pascual
- Ramon Pido
- Bryant Punzalan
- JayJay Robles
- Paeng Santos
- Vince John Santos
- Siot Tanquingcen
- Eric Gascon
- Joel Dungca

=== Team Manager ===
- Gil Cortez
