= Alex Compton =

Filipino-American former basketball player and former coach

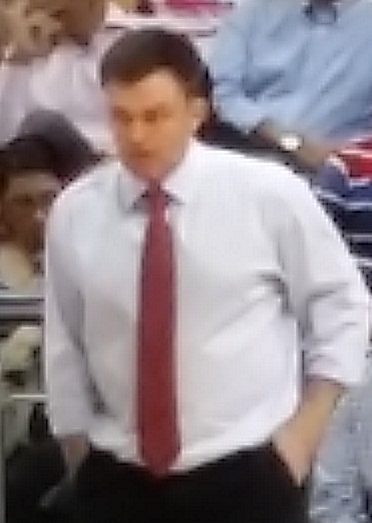
- Compton in 2014

Personal information
- Born: March 16, 1974 (age 52) Makati, Philippines
- Listed height: 5 ft 11 in (1.80 m)
- Listed weight: 175 lb (79 kg)

Career information
- High school: Madison West (Madison, Wisconsin)
- College: Saint Joseph's (1992–1994); Cornell (1995–1997)
- Playing career: 1998–2008
- Number: 44
- Coaching career: 2006–2019

Career history

Playing
- 1998–2000: Manila Metrostars
- 2001: Batangas Blades
- 2002: LBC-Batangas Blades
- 2003: Sunkist-UST Tigers
- 2004–2005: Montaña Pawnshop Jewels
- 2006–2008: Welcoat Dragons

Coaching
- 2006–2009: Welcoat Dragons/Rain or Shine Elasto Painters (assistant)
- 2009–2012: Coca-Cola Tigers / Powerade Tigers (assistant)
- 2012–2014: Alaska Aces (assistant)
- 2014–2019: Alaska Aces

Career highlights
- As player: 2× MBA champion (1999, 2001); MBA Most Valuable Player (1999); All-MBA (1999, 2001); PBL champion (2004-05 Open Championship's); PBL Finals MVP (2004-05 Open Championship's); PBL Mythical Second Team (2003-04 Platinum, 2006 Unity); PBL Sportsmanship Award (2002-03 Challenge); As assistant coach: PBA champion (2013 Commissioner's)
Medals
Men's basketball
Assistant coach for Philippines
FIBA Asia Championship
Silver medal – second place	2015 Changsha	Team
William Jones Cup
Silver medal – second place	2015 Taipei	National Team

Alexander M. Compton (born March 16, 1974) is a Philippine-born American retired basketball player and coach. He also served as the head coach of the Alaska Aces of the Philippine Basketball Association (PBA).

== Early life and college career ==
Born in Makati in the Philippines, Compton and his family spent a year in northeastern Thailand when he was ten years old. His parents, both Southeast Asian Studies scholars, were researchers there.

Compton moved to Madison from Ithaca, New York in 1988, when his parents began working at the University of Wisconsin. He was a starting guard on the 1992 Madison West High School basketball squad. There he helped lead the school's only state championship team since 1945. In recognition of his prep basketball career, he was inducted into the Wisconsin Basketball Coaches Association Hall of Fame in 2023. After high school, he played for St. Joseph's University and Cornell University.

Although Compton dreamed of playing in a foreign league, he had no clue how to get into one until his junior year at Cornell. When a coach heard that he was born in the Philippines, he told Compton that he could play on a team in the Philippine Basketball Association (PBA). He found an agent, who arranged for him to join a team in July 1997, after graduation.

== Playing career ==
Compton played four seasons in the defunct Metropolitan Basketball Association with the Manila Metrostars and the Batangas Blades. He won the 1999 MBA Most Valuable Player award when the Metrostars won the national title, and won another championship with the Blades in 2001.

By the time the MBA folded in 2002, Compton was a fixture in Philippine basketball and fully assimilated into the culture. However, he still could not play in the PBA due to the league's eligibility rules, which do not allow naturalized Filipino citizens to play. Instead, he appeared on television as a basketball analyst, but was finally allowed to play for a short period of time for the Welcoat Dragons in the PBA.

Compton also got an exception from the Philippine Basketball League. He played for the Sunkist-UST Tigers and the Montaña Pawnshop Jewels from 2003 to 2005. He led the Jewels to its only PBL crown in the 2005 PBL Open Championship.

== Coaching career ==
=== Being an assistant ===
In the 2006–07 PBA Philippine Cup, Compton was hired as one of the assistant coaches of the Dragons before being allowed by the PBA to play as the team's second import for the 2007 and 2008 PBA Fiesta Conference, his only PBA appearance as a player. He was elevated to the assistant head coaching position with the Rain or Shine Elasto Painters from 2006 to 2009.

He then moved over to Powerade Tigers as assistant to Bo Perasol until its last conference in 2012.

After the Powerade franchise was sold to GlobalPort, he became an assistant to Luigi Trillo of Alaska. He helped the squad win the 2013 PBA Commissioner's Cup, their 14th title and the first in the post-Tim Cone era. During this time, he also received offers to become the head coach for the Ateneo Blue Eagles and the GlobalPort Batang Pier.

=== Alaska ===
Two games into the 2014 PBA Governors' Cup, Compton was appointed the head coach of Alaska Aces, replacing Luigi Trillo. In his first head coaching stint, he led the Aces to the semi-finals, losing to Rain or Shine in full five games.

In the following season, Compton together with his former coach at Metrostars Louie Alas, the team abandoned triangle offense in favor of fast paced offense with combination of full court press defensive system. Those are used because the utilization of guards in the bench rotation, plus citing innovation at international scene. Also, the hybrid system got positive reaction from the players, especially from their star Calvin Abueva.

With the hybrid system is played, it helped them to steer the Aces to the 2014–15 Philippine Cup finals where he went up against coach Leo Austria, who had been his head coach when they were still with Welcoat. Alaska went on to lose to the San Miguel Beermen in seven hard-fought games. He then got to coach the South All-Stars during the 2015 All-Star Weekend. He also guided the Aces to the 2015 Governors' Cup finals only to be swept by the Beermen in four games. In a rematch of the previous season's Philippine Cup finals, the Beermen once again beat the Alaska Aces in 7 games, completing the Beermen's historic comeback from down 0–3 to win the series. Alaska returned to the finals once again in the 2015 Commissioner's Cup, where they lost 4–2 to Rain or Shine.

In 2018, Compton led Alaska to another finals appearance, where they lost to the Magnolia Hotshots. He resigned as coach in 2019 and was replaced by another Alaska franchise legend Jeffrey Cariaso.

== National team ==
In 2015, Compton was invited by Philippines men's national basketball team head coach Tab Baldwin to be one of his coaching staff as assistant coach. He helped the national team to win two silver medals from 2015 William Jones Cup and 2015 FIBA Asia Championship respectively.

Compton officially returned to the program in early 2020. In October of that year, he left the program, returning to the US to be with family.

== Career statistics ==
=== College ===
Legend
GP	Games played	MPG	Minutes per game
FG%	Field-goal percentage	3P%	3-point field-goal percentage	FT%	Free-throw percentage
RPG	Rebounds per game	APG	Assists per game	SPG	Steals per game
BPG	Blocks per game	PPG	Points per game	**Bold**	Career high

Season	Team	GP	GS	MPG	FG%	3P%	FT%	RPG	APG	SPG	BPG	PPG
1992–93	St. Joseph's	19	0	2.7	.421	.364	.833	.3	.2	.1	.0	1.3
1993–94	St. Joseph's	19	0	4.4	.438	.250	**1.000**	.3	.5	.2	.0	1.4
1995–96	Cornell	26	19	24.8	.374	.363	.867	**2.6**	2.7	1.0	**.1**	11.2
1996–97	Cornell	**26**	**25**	**35.7**	**.464**	**.425**	.852	2.5	**3.5**	**1.1**	.0	**11.9**
Overall		90	44	19.0	.417	.388	.869	1.6	1.9	.7	.0	7.2

== Head coaching record ==
=== Professional ===
Team	Season	Conference	G	W	L	PCT	Finish	PG	PW	PL	P-PCT	Result
Alaska	2013–14	Governors' Cup	7	4	3	.571	3rd	6	3	3	.500	Lost in the semifinals
Alaska	2014–15	Philippine Cup	11	8	3	.727	3rd	15	10	5	.667	Lost in the finals
Alaska	2014–15	Commissioner's Cup	11	5	6	.455	6th	2	0	2	.000	Lost in the quarterfinals
Alaska	2014–15	Governors' Cup	11	8	3	.727	1st	8	4	4	.500	Lost in the finals
Alaska	2015–16	Philippine Cup	11	9	2	.818	3rd	12	7	5	.583	Lost in the finals
Alaska	2015–16	Commissioner's Cup	11	7	4	.636	3rd	14	7	7	.500	Lost in the finals
Alaska	2015–16	Governors' Cup	11	6	5	.545	6th	1	0	1	.000	Lost in the quarterfinals with twice-to-win disadvantage
Alaska	2016–17	Philippine Cup	11	7	4	.636	2nd	2	0	2	.000	Lost in the quarterfinals with twice-to-beat advantage
Alaska	2016–17	Commissioner's Cup	11	4	7	.364	9th	—	—	—	—	Missed playoffs
Alaska	2016–17	Governors' Cup	11	3	8	.273	9th	—	—	—	—	Missed playoffs
Alaska	2017–18	Philippine Cup	11	7	4	.636	3rd	2	0	2	.000	Lost in the quarterfinals
Alaska	2017–18	Commissioner's Cup	11	8	3	.727	2nd	5	2	3	.400	Lost in the semifinals
Alaska	2017–18	Governors' Cup	11	8	3	.727	3rd	11	6	5	.545	Lost in the finals
Alaska	2019	Philippine Cup	11	4	7	.364	8th	1	0	1	.000	Lost in the quarterfinals with twice-to-win disadvantage
Alaska	2019	Commissioner's Cup	11	4	7	.364	8th	2	1	1	.500	Lost in the quarterfinals with twice-to-win disadvantage
Career Total			161	92	69	.571	Playoff Total	81	40	41	.494	0 PBA championship

== Commentary ==
Compton started being a color commentator in PBA on NBN/IBC. He was notably did it in 2005 for UAAP Basketball coverages of ABS-CBN Sports with Sev Sarmenta. After that, he also served as a color commentator for PBA coverages in 2009 for Solar TV and returned to commentary in 2016 PBA Governors' Cup Finals on TV5. In 2019, he was a commentator for PBA Rush.

== Personal life ==
Compton is currently married to a Filipina, model Michelle Astudillo. They have two sons and a daughter. As of 2025, Compton is based in Wisconsin and is now a book author writing self-help books for parents who have sports-inclined children.

Compton is fluent in Filipino. He also appeared on Coffee Mate commercials in early 2000s, where he has some Tagalog lines.

Preceded by John Ferriols	MBA Most Valuable Player; 1999	Succeeded by Rommel Adducul
