= Nueva Ecija Patriots =

- Leagues: MBA (1999-2001)
- Founded: 1999
- History: Nueva Ecija Patriots; 1999-2001
- Arena: Araullo University Gym
- Location: Nueva Ecija, Philippines
- Team colors: green, kelly green and white
- Head coach: Joe Lipa

The Nueva Ecija Patriots were a professional basketball team in the now-defunct Metropolitan Basketball Association from 1999 to 2001. The Patriots were derived from the province's origin during the Philippine revolution against the Spanish colonial rule in the late 19th century.

== History ==
In 1999, the MBA added three more franchises to increase their number of clubs to 15 with Nueva Ecija, San Juan, Metro Manila and Surigao. Under former national team coach Joe Lipa, the Patriots will parade Fil-American Alex Crisano, who played in Cortez High School back in the United States and was a slamdunk champion in a Filipino community in New York. Former Letran Knight Willie Miller, who at that time had an existing contract playing for Tanduay Rhum in the Philippine Basketball League. Aside from Crisano and Miller, there is the youthful Rensy Bajar, Julius Vinuya, three-point specialist John Verrayo, Ferdinand Ninoc, the Chaneco brothers Joel and Jerome and comebacking cagers Ramil Cruz and Dodong Postanes. The Patriots played their home games in Araullo University Gym.

The Patriots lost in the first-ever match against fellow expansion team San Juan Knights at the Cuneta Astrodome. The Patriots struggled throughout the 1999 season despite Miller ranking among the top 10 leaders in scoring, Crisano was later traded to the Pangasinan Waves as they held the third-worst record in the league at 7–23 win-loss slate.

In 2000, Nueva Ecija improved its record by three games but missed the playoffs for the second straight year with a 10–16 record. A year later, Miller left the team to join the Philippine Basketball Association. The Patriots went 3–11 both phases of the tournament.

After the season, the Patriots ceased operations and did not return for the 2002 season.

== 1999 Roster ==
Nueva Ecija Patriots roster
Players
Coaches

Pos.	No.	Nat.	Name	Ht.	Wt.
G	1	(Philippines)	Willie Miller	5 ft 11 in (1.80 m)
F	3	(Philippines)	Ramil Cruz	6 ft 2 in (1.88 m)
F	4	(Philippines)	John Verayo	6 ft 3 in (1.91 m)
G	7	(Philippines)	Rensy Bajar	5 ft 9 in (1.75 m)
F	8	(Philippines)	Edgar Postanes	6 ft 2 in (1.88 m)
F	9	(Philippines)	John Velasco	6 ft 3 in (1.91 m)
G	10	(Philippines)	Ferdinand Minoc	6 ft 1 in (1.85 m)
F	15	(Philippines)	Joel Chaneco	6 ft 2 in (1.88 m)
G	18	(Philippines)	Jerome Chaneco	5 ft 11 in (1.80 m)
C	21	(Philippines)	Julius Binuya	6 ft 5 in (1.96 m)
F	25	(Philippines)	Joel Gaspar	6 ft 1 in (1.85 m)
F	30	(United States)	Cid White	6 ft 3 in (1.91 m)
C	43	(United States)	Alex Crisano	6 ft 7 in (2.01 m)

Head coach

- Joe Lipa

Assistant coach(es)

- Nemie Villegas
- Jose Bernardo Yango
- Dino Ponce-Enrile

Legend

- (C) Team captain
- Injured

== Other notable players ==
- Bob Allen
- Francis Aquino
- Billy Bansil
- Dave Bautista
- Oliver Bunyi
- Bernard de Guia
- Andy de Guzman
- Jonathan de Guzman
- Ariel Garcia
- Eric Gascon
- Rolof Liangco
- Matthew Makalintal
- Cornelio "Sonny" Manucat
- Bryant Punsalan
- Dexter Racho
