= Rommel Adducul =

Filipino basketball player and coach

Adamson Soaring Falcons
- Title: Assistant coach
- League: UAAP

Personal information
- Born: April 21, 1976 (age 50) Tuguegarao, Cagayan, Philippines
- Listed height: 6 ft 6 in (1.98 m)
- Listed weight: 230 lb (104 kg)

Career information
- College: San Sebastian
- PBA draft: 2003: 1st round, 2nd overall pick
- Drafted by: Barangay Ginebra Kings
- Playing career: 1998–2013
- Position: Center
- Number: 10, 17, 82
- Coaching career: 2013–present

Career history

Playing
- 1998–2000: Manila Metrostars
- 2001: LBC-Batangas Blades
- 2002: Osaka-Pangasinan Waves
- 2003–2006: Barangay Ginebra Kings
- 2006–2007: San Miguel Beermen
- 2007–2011: Purefoods Tender Juicy Giants / B-Meg Derby Ace Llamados
- 2011–2012: Powerade Tigers
- 2012–2013: GlobalPort Batang Pier

Coaching
- 2013–2014: GlobalPort Batang Pier (assistant)
- 2014–2020: Lyceum (assistant)
- 2019–2021: Blackwater Elite / Blackwater Bossing (assistant)
- 2021–present: Adamson (assistant)

Career highlights
- as player: 3x PBA champion (2004 Fiesta, 2005 Philippine, 2010 Philippine); 4x PBA All-Star (2004–2007); PBA Mythical Second Team (2004–05); 3x FIBA Asian All-Star (1997, 1998, 2000); FIBA Asia Club Championship Mythical Five Selection (2005); 2x MBA champion (1999, 2001); MBA Most Valuable Player (2000); 4x NCAA Philippines champion (1994, 1995, 1996, 1997); 2x NCAA Philippines Most Valuable Player (1996, 1997); NCAA Philippines Rookie of the Year (1994); PBL champion (2002-03 Challenge); 2x PBL Most Valuable Player (1997 Makati Mayor's, 2002-03 Challenge); PBL Finals MVP (2002-03 Challenge); 3× PBL Mythical First Team (1997 Makati Mayor's,1997-98 All-Filipino, 2002-03 Challenge); PBL 20 Greatest Players of All-Time (2003); as assistant coach: AsiaBasket champion (2025 International)

Rommel Adducul (born April 21, 1976) is a Filipino former professional basketball player who currently serves as an assistant coach for the Adamson Soaring Falcons of the UAAP.

== Career ==
In college, Adducul, a three-time Most Valuable Player, led the San Sebastian Stags to five consecutive NCAA basketball championships from 1993 to 1997. He won the NCAA Seniors Most valuable Player (MVP) back-to-back from 1996 and 1997.

At the same time, he was a star in the Philippine Basketball League playing for the defunct Chowking Food Masters, his UAAP counterpart at that time and later Arch-rival was Danny Ildefonso.

In 1998, Adducul joined the Philippines' second professional league, the now defunct Metropolitan Basketball Association. In 1999, he led the Manila Metrostars to a championship together with American Alex Compton, and was awarded with the Play-off MVP and the Finals MVP. In 2000, Adducul was named MBA Most Valuable Player. In 2001, the Metrostars merged with the Batangas Blades and the coalition team won that year's championship. Unfortunately, the league did not last long and Adducul ended his career in the MBA with the Pangasinan Waves in 2002.

Adducul is a many-time member of the Philippine national basketball team. In 1994, he played for the Philippines at the 19-and-under FIBA Asia Championship. Then, he led the country to four consecutive Southeast Asia Basketball Association championships (1998–2001). He also led the national team to three consecutive South East Asian Games gold medals (1997, 1999, 2001). Adducul is a three-time member of the FIBA Asia All-Star Selection (1997, 1998, 2000) and in 2000, he led the All-Star team against the Philippine Basketball Association All-Stars.

At the same year, he returned briefly in the Philippine Basketball League and won that year's MVP award.

In 2003, he was drafted 2nd overall by the Barangay Ginebra Kings in the Philippine Basketball Association (PBA). He won two consecutive championships with the Kings in the 2004 and 2005 PBA seasons.

In October 2006, he was traded to the San Miguel Beermen in a three-way trade involving the Gin Kings and the Red Bull Barako.

In May 2007, he was traded to Red Bull in exchange for Enrico Villanueva.

After two days of trading him to the Barako, Adducul was shipped to the Purefoods Tender Juicy Giants for Don Camaso where he won his third and final championship during the 2010 Philippine Cup. He went on to finish his pro career playing for the Powerade Tigers and the GlobalPort Batang Pier.

== PBA career statistics ==
Legend
| GP | Games played | MPG | Minutes per game |
| FG% | Field-goal percentage | 3P% | 3-point field-goal percentage | FT% | Free-throw percentage |
| RPG | Rebounds per game | APG | Assists per game | SPG | Steals per game |
| BPG | Blocks per game | PPG | Points per game | **Bold** | Career high |

=== Season-by-season averages ===
| Year | Team | GP | MPG | FG% | 3P% | FT% | RPG | APG | SPG | BPG | PPG |
|---|---|---|---|---|---|---|---|---|---|---|---|
| 2003 | Barangay Ginebra | 40 | **28.4** | .479 | — | .448 | 8.4 | **1.1** | **.4** | .7 | 8.1 |
| 2004–05 | Barangay Ginebra | **74** | 25.6 | .499 | .000 | .373 | 8.1 | **1.1** | .3 | .8 | **9.3** |
| 2005–06 | Barangay Ginebra | 34 | 27.0 | .469 | .000 | .474 | **8.5** | **1.1** | .2 | **.9** | 8.9 |
| 2006–07 | Barangay Ginebra | 49 | 16.2 | .469 | .000 | .495 | 5.6 | .8 | .2 | .6 | 5.0 |
| 2006–07 | San Miguel | 49 | 16.2 | .469 | .000 | .495 | 5.6 | .8 | .2 | .6 | 5.0 |
| 2006–07 | Purefoods | 49 | 16.2 | .469 | .000 | .495 | 5.6 | .8 | .2 | .6 | 5.0 |
| 2007–08 | Purefoods | 32 | 21.2 | **.520** | — | .470 | 7.1 | .5 | .2 | .8 | 6.0 |
| 2008–09 | Purefoods | 14 | 13.6 | .500 | — | **.615** | 2.9 | .4 | .1 | .1 | 3.3 |
| 2009–10 | Purefoods / B-Meg Derby Ace | 32 | 6.9 | .365 | — | .480 | 1.7 | .1 | .0 | .2 | 1.6 |
| 2010–11 | B-Meg Derby Ace | 27 | 8.9 | .435 | — | .267 | 2.9 | .2 | .1 | .3 | 2.1 |
| 2011–12 | Powerade | 40 | 15.6 | .444 | .000 | .360 | 4.0 | .6 | .3 | .7 | 3.5 |
| 2012–13 | GlobalPort | 14 | 8.1 | .450 | — | .500 | 1.8 | .2 | .1 | .1 | 1.4 |
| Career | | 356 | 13.6 | .479 | .000 | .432 | 5.9 | .7 | .2 | .6 | 5.8 |

== Personal life ==
Adducul was diagnosed with nasopharynx cancer. This condition prevented him from playing in the 2008 PBA Fiesta Conference to undergo chemotherapy, but has since returned. On May 3 Startalk, Romel said in an interview: "Right now, I'm doing fine because I see the improvement [from the chemo], the mass is shrinking; The radiation, 35 sessions, five times a week. The chemo is 6 cycles. I have my third cycle on Thursday, and after two more weeks I'll be finished with my last cycle which is three sessions. One week in the hospital...it's really hard but I have to do it."

== Awards and achievements ==
=== Collegiate achievements ===
- 1994 NCAA Basketball Champions
- 1995 NCAA Basketball Champions
- 1996 NCAA Basketball Champions
- 1997 NCAA Basketball Champions
- ×2 NCAA Basketball Most Valuable Player (1996, 1997)
- 1994–1997 NCAA Basketball Mythical 5

=== PBL achievements ===
- 1997 PBL Makati Mayor's Cup Most Valuable Player
- 2002 PBL Challenge Cup Most Valuable Player
- 2002 PBL Challenge Finals Most Valuable Player
- Philippine Basketball League Top 20 Greatest Players of all time (2003)

=== MBA achievements ===
- 1999 MBA Champions
- 2001 MBA Champions
- 1998 MBA Defensive Player of the Year
- 1999 MBA Defensive Player of the Year
- 1999 MBA Play-off Most Valuable Player
- 1999 MBA Finals Most Valuable Player
- 2000 MBA Most Valuable Player
- 2001 MBA Finals Most Valuable Player
- 2000 MBA Intra-Con Challenge finalists
- 1998–2002 MBA Star Player Of The Year

=== PBA achievements ===
- 2004 PBA Gran Matador Fiesta Conference Champions
- 2005 PBA Philippine Cup Champions
- 2006–2007 PBA Philippine Cup finalists
- PBA Mythical Second Team Selection (2004–05)

=== International career highlights ===
Club and Country

- 1994 19-and-under FIBA Asia Championship
- 1997 FIBA Asia Championship, 9th place
  - Emirates Sportsmanship Award
  - 1997 FIBA Asian All-Star Games
  - 1997 FIBA Asian All-Star Sportsmanship Award
- 1997 South East Asian Games champions
- 1998 South East Asia Basketball Association champions
- 1998 FIBA Asian All-Star Extravaganza
- 1999 South East Asia Basketball Association champions
  - South East Asia Basketball Association Most Valuable Player (1999)
- 1999 Ramadan Basketball Tournament
- 1999 South East Asian Games champions
- 2000 South East Asia Club Championship champions
  - South East Asia Basketball Association Club Championship Most Valuable Player (2000)
- 2000 South East Asia Basketball Association champions
- 2000 FIBA Asian All-Star Extravaganza
- 2001 South East Asia Basketball Association champions
- 2001 South East Asian Games champions
- 2002 William Jones Cup, 5th place
- 2002 Shell Rimula Brunei Cup champions
  - Shell Rimula Brunei Cup Most Valuable Player (2002)
- 2002 Super Kung Sheung International Basketball Invitation Championship champions
  - Nike Best Shooter Award (2002)
- 2002 Yunnan International Tournament Honghe Cup Grand Prix
- 2005 FIBA Asia Champions Cup, 5th place
  - FIBA Asia Champions Cup Mythical Five Selection (2005)
- 2005 Las Vegas Global Hoops Summit
- 2005 William Jones Cup, 3rd place
- 2005 Shell Rimula Brunei Cup champions
- 2006 Shell Rimula Brunei Cup
- 2007 Bahrain-Philippines Goodwill Games champions

== See also ==
- Philippine national basketball team

| Preceded by Alex Compton | MBA Most Valuable Player; 2000 | Succeeded by Eddie Laure |
