= Pangasinan Presidents =

Defunct basketball team based in Pangasinan, Philippines

- Leagues: MBA (1998–1999; 2002)
- Founded: 1998
- History: Pangasinan Presidents (1998–1999); Pangasinan Waves (1999 & 2002)
- Arena: Don Narciso Ramos Sports Complex and Dagupan City People's Astrodome
- Location: Pangasinan, Philippines
- Team colors: Red, Blue and yellow
- Head coach: Dong Vergeire; Chot Reyes

The Pangasinan Presidents were a professional basketball team in the now-defunct Metropolitan Basketball Association from 1998 to 1999. The Presidents' name is derived from President Fidel V. Ramos, who hailed from Pangasinan. The team owner is Tim Orbos, a brother of then-Pangasinan Governor Oscar Orbos. Later at the mid of 1999 season, the Presidents renamed to Waves to Markable the bigwaves saw at the Lingayen Gulf. Pangasinan team is one of the 12 original teams of the MBA.

== Pangasinan Presidents 1998 - 1999 ==
- March 7, 1998, the 1st ever game of MBA and hosted at the Don Narciso Ramos Gym in Pangasinan home court of Pangasinan Presidents.
- By mid season, as low in standing. They traded Ato Morano to Pampanga Dragons at Ralph Rivera to Batangas Blades.
- 1999 season, as low standing, Presidents trade and got Alex Crisano, Fil-am from Nueva Ecija Patriots, at changed team name from Presidents to Waves.

== Pangasinan Waves 1999 ==
- Mid 1999, Pangasinan Presidents changed name to Pangasinan Waves and got Alex Crisano from Nueva Ecija.
- And the team absents in 2000 season at 2001 season.

== Osaka-Pangasinan Waves 2002 ==
- 2002 season, Pangasinan Waves return to MBA with sponsor Osaka Iridulogy and Tanduay. After Tanduay sale francise in PBA to Fedex-Laguna Lakers.

== Record ==
Season	Conference	Team	Elimination/Classification round					Playoffs				
Season	Conference	Team	GP	W	L	PCT	Finish	PG	W	L	PCT	Result
1998	Northern Conference	Pangasinan Presidents	21	6	15	—	12th	—	—	—	—	Eliminated
1999	Northern Conference	Pangasinan Presidents	30	5	25	—	15th	—	—	—	—	Eliminated
2002	1st Conference	Osaka-Pangasinan Waves	10	5	5	—	4th	—	—	—	—	Eliminated
2002	National Conference	Osaka-Pangasinan Waves	5	1	4	—	7th	—	—	—	—	Eliminated
Career total			65	17	45		Playoff total	0	0	0	0	0 MBA championships
