= John Ferriols =

Filipino basketball player

Blackwater Bossing
- Title: Assistant coach
- League: PBA

Personal information
- Born: September 9, 1974 (age 52) Davao City, Philippines
- Listed height: 6 ft 4 in (1.93 m)
- Listed weight: 205 lb (93 kg)

Career information
- College: USJ–R
- PBA draft: 2003: 2nd round, 12th overall pick
- Drafted by: FedEx Express
- Playing career: 1998–2017
- Position: Power forward
- Coaching career: 2025–present

Career history

Playing
- 1998–2002: Negros/RCPI-Negros Slashers
- 2003–2006: FedEx Express
- 2006: Talk 'N Text Phone Pals
- 2006–2010: Alaska Aces
- 2010: Barangay Ginebra Kings
- 2010–2011: Rain or Shine Elasto Painters
- 2011–2012: B-Meg Llamados
- 2011–2012: San Miguel Beermen (ABL)
- 2012–2014: Talk 'N Text Tropang Texters
- 2014–2017: Meralco Bolts

Coaching
- 2025: Mindoro Tamaraws (assistant)
- 2025–present: Blackwater Bossing (assistant)
- 2026–present: San Sebastian (assistant)

Career highlights
- 2× PBA champion (2007 Fiesta, 2012–13 Philippine); MBA champion (2002); MBA Most Valuable Player (1998); 4× PBA All-Star (2004–2005, 2008–2009)

Hubert John B. Ferriols (born September 9, 1974 in Davao City, Philippines) is a Filipino professional basketball coach and former player who is an assistant coach for the Blackwater Bossing of the Philippine Basketball Association (PBA). Ferriols was a former star in the defunct Metropolitan Basketball Association (MBA), after which he spent fourteen years in the Philippine Basketball Association (PBA).

== Professional career ==
=== Metropolitan Basketball Association (MBA) ===
Ferriols started his career with the Negros Slashers of the now-defunct Metropolitan Basketball Association (MBA). Ferriols was declared as the league's MVP in the league's inaugural season. He led the Slashers to its only title in the MBA during the 2002 season, MBA's final season. He played for five years with the Slashers, from the league's establishment to its folding in 2002. In the MBA, Ferriols was one of the league's star players and became the face of the Slashers franchise.

=== Philippine Basketball Association (PBA) ===
After the MBA folded, Ferriols entered the Philippine Basketball Association (PBA). He was drafted by the FedEx Express twelfth overall in the 2003 PBA draft.

Ferriols has played for eight teams in the PBA. He started his career with the Air21 Express and then with Talk 'N Text Phone Pals.

While playing for the Alaska Aces, he was provided sufficient playing time, and improved with the coaching of Tim Cone.

Ferriols was signed by the Barangay Ginebra Kings for the 2010 PBA Fiesta Conference. After he was waived by Barangay Ginebra, the Rain or Shine Elasto Painters then signed him.

In September 2011, before the start of 2011–12 PBA season, Ferriols was signed by B-Meg Llamados.

In 2012, Ferriols was signed by Talk 'N Text Tropang Texters. However, his contract was not renewed by Talk 'N Text and was released during the 2013–14 season.

In 2014, Ferriols was signed as a free agent by the Meralco Bolts.

=== ASEAN Basketball League ===
Ferriols was signed by San Miguel Beermen of the ASEAN Basketball League (ABL) for the 2012 ABL season.

== PBA career statistics ==
Legend
GP	Games played	MPG	Minutes per game
FG%	Field-goal percentage	3P%	3-point field-goal percentage	FT%	Free-throw percentage
RPG	Rebounds per game	APG	Assists per game	SPG	Steals per game
BPG	Blocks per game	PPG	Points per game	**Bold**	Career high

Correct as October 19, 2016

=== Season-by-season averages ===
Year	Team	GP	MPG	FG%	3P%	FT%	RPG	APG	SPG	BPG	PPG
2003	FedEx	42	22.4	.486	.000	.525	6.2	.9	.6	**.6**	8.5
2004–05	FedEx	**59**	**26.2**	.476	.000	.585	**7.1**	**1.5**	**.7**	.4	**10.8**
2005–06	Air21 / Talk 'N Text	32	11.9	.436	.000	.569	3.8	.4	.2	.2	5.2
2005–06	Alaska	28	16.7	.443	.000	.485	5.3	.6	.3	.3	5.9
2006–07	Alaska	51	20.0	.492	.000	.536	6.4	1.2	.4	.2	8.2
2007–08	Alaska	46	19.7	.504	.000	.646	6.4	1.1	.4	.2	7.5
2008–09	Alaska	45	14.1	.470	.000	.673	3.9	1.0	.3	.1	4.6
2009–10	Alaska / Burger King	27	10.4	**.700**	.000	.722	2.2	.9	.0	.1	2.6
2010–11	Barangay Ginebra / Rain or Shine	27	9.6	.454	.000	.636	2.5	.5	.1	.2	3.4
2011–12	B-Meg	6	5.0	.600	.000	.667	1.3	.2	.3	.3	2.3
2012–13	Talk 'N Text	26	6.2	.500	.000	.643	2.0	.2	.1	.1	2.2
2013–14	Talk 'N Text	6	4.3	.500	.000	**1.000**	1.5	.2	.0	.0	1.5
2014–15	Meralco	32	9.7	.526	.000	.643	1.8	.5	.3	.1	2.8
2015–16	Meralco	12	6.1	.588	.000	.000	1.5	.3	.2	.1	1.7
Career		439	16.0	.484	.000	.586	4.6	.9	.3	.2	6.0
