= Sarangani Marlins =

Professional basketball team in Sarangani, Philippines

- 2026 Sarangani Marlins season
- Leagues: MBA (1998–2001); MPBL (2019–present); Chooks-to-Go Pilipinas 3x3 (formerly)
- Founded: 1998; 28 years ago (first incarnation); 2019; 7 years ago (first incarnation)
- History: SocSarGen Marlins; 1998–2001; SocSarGen-Taguig Marlins; 2001; Soccsksargen Marlins; 2019; Sarangani Marlins; 2019–2024, 2026–present Sarangani Gripper Motorcycle Tire; 2025
- Arena: Sarangani Capitol Gymnasium (last used in 2023)
- Location: Alabel, Sarangani
- Team colors
- Main sponsor: 10Act Sports
- Head coach: John Kallos

The Sarangani Marlins (also known as Sarangani Marlins-10Act) is a Philippine professional basketball team based in Alabel, Sarangani. The team competes in the Maharlika Pilipinas Basketball League (MPBL) as a member of the league's South Division. The team most recently played its home games at Sarangani Capitol Gymnasium.

The team's first incarnation was founded in 1998 as a charter team of the Metropolitan Basketball Association (MBA). The team was known as the SocSarGen Marlins, then became the SocSarGen-Taguig Marlins in 2001 Second Phase upon relocating to Taguig. The Marlins then returned for the MPBL in the 2019–20 season, going by the Soccsksargen Marlins as a nod to its original incarnation. Amidst a restructuring due to the team's game-fixing scandal in 2019, the team's name was changed to its current form.

The Marlins are one of five teams based in Mindanao and one of two based in the Soccsksargen region, the other being the GenSan Warriors.

== History ==
=== First incarnation (1998–2001) ===
The SocSarGen Marlins were able to reach the quarterfinals in the MBA's inaugural season. The Marlins were bannered by veteran PBA campaigners Maximo Delantes and Teroy Albarillo. SocSarGen finished its regular season record with 11 wins as against 11 losses, good for fourth spot in the Southern Conference. The Marlins' cager Maximo Delantes figured prominently in the MVP race but couldn't make it to the MBA mythical five due to his team's poor performance in each of the playoffs.

Coach Biboy Ravanes was replaced by fellow ex-pro Willie Generalao at the Marlins' bench at the start of the 2000 MBA season. SocSarGen was fifth in the standings in the Southern Conference with four wins and eight losses.

In 2001, the team relocated to Taguig and became the SocSarGen-Taguig Marlins in the second phase conference. The Marlins finished last in both phases of the 2001 MBA season with a combined record of five wins and 23 losses.

=== Second incarnation (2019–present) ===
In the 2019, the Marlins returned to the basketball scene with the Maharlika Pilipinas Basketball League. The team was also relocated back to Mindanao, this time in the Soccsksargen region, joining the GenSan Warriors, which joined the league in the previous season. Heading into the 2019–20 season, the team was named the Soccsksargen Marlins, a nod to its original name and having a full regional scope.

On November 4, 2019, the team was suspended due to game-fixing allegations. Management of the team had to be turned over and the team would later be renamed the Sarangani Marlins. The team, however, finished with only one win out of 30 games, the win came against Quezon City. With a .033 win percentage, the Marlins hold the worst record in league history.

In the 2021 MPBL Invitational, the team was drawn into Group C, but failed to make the playoff tournament, only getting one win against Muntinlupa. The team would make a push in the 2022 season, with players like Kit Jimenez, the team was able to finish with the third-best record in the South Division with a 16-5 record. Jimenez would also record the league's first quaruple-double late in the regular season. The Marlins would unfortunately lose in an upset against sixth-seeded Rizal in the First Round of the 2022 playoffs.

For the 2023 season, Jeff Viernes would join the team. Viernes then recorded the league's first 50-point game in a win against Nueva Ecija.

For the 2025 season, the team changed their name as the Sarangani Gripper Motorcycle Tires due to sponsorship reason.

For the 2026 season, the team reverted back the name as the Sarangani Marlins.

== Current roster ==
Sarangani Marlins roster
Players

Pos.	No.	Name	Height	Weight	DOB	From
G	1	John Carlos Escalambre	6 ft 0 in (1.83 m)			UST
F	8	Danny Marilao	6 ft 2 in (1.88 m)			San Lorenzo
G	9	Leland Reuben Estacio	6 ft 2 in (1.88 m)			UST
F	10	CJ Tan (HG)	6 ft 2 in (1.88 m)			UST
G/F	11	Paul Sanga	6 ft 4 in (1.93 m)		1987–04–21	Far Eastern
G	12	Migs Pascual	5 ft 10 in (1.78 m)		2001–07–24	San Sebastian
F/C	13	Coy Alves	6 ft 6 in (1.98 m)		1996–01–30	DLSU–Dasma
G	14	Jerie Pingoy	5 ft 9 in (1.75 m)	170 lb (77 kg)	1994–12–19	Adamson
F	15	Ralph Tansingco	6 ft 4 in (1.93 m)			Lyceum
G	18	Alex Desoyo	5 ft 9 in (1.75 m)			San Sebastian
G	19	John Cantimbuhan	5 ft 10 in (1.78 m)
F	21	Benjie Jimenez	6 ft 2 in (1.88 m)			OLFU
C	22	Tzaddy Rangel	6 ft 7 in (2.01 m)		1996–12–22	National-U
G/F	23	Vhasma Jordan Gatus	6 ft 2 in (1.88 m)			San Lorenzo
G	24	Carl Bryan Lacap	5 ft 11 in (1.80 m)			Mapúa
G/F	25	Ahron Decano	5 ft 11 in (1.80 m)			Mapúa
G	26	Tricky Peromingan (HG)	5 ft 11 in (1.80 m)			Adamson
G	28	Jose Julio Escalambre	5 ft 10 in (1.78 m)			Adamson
G	30	Charles Callano	5 ft 7 in (1.70 m)			San Lorenzo
C	32	Ken Brilliantes	6 ft 6 in (1.98 m)		2000–06–07	Letran
F	52	Larce Christian Sunga	6 ft 4 in (1.93 m)		1999–05–26	Arellano
F	77	Andre Duremdes (HG)	6 ft 4 in (1.93 m)			UST

Coaches

Head coach

- John Kallos

Assistant coach(es)

- Jon Corbarrubias
- Jhon Labrador
- Josphua Inocentes
- Jeffrey Cleofas
- Bonnie Garcia
- Nolet Boringot
- Norlan Boringot
- Gilbert Cole
- Laurence Lopez

Team manager

- Andrew Belarmino

Legend

- (HG) Homegrown
- (FF) Filipino-foreigner
- (EA) EASL player
- (RS) Reserve player
- (S) Suspended
- Injured

- Roster – via Genius Sports
Updated as of: June 22, 2026

=== Head coaches ===
Sarangani Marlins head coaches
#	Name	Start	End	Achievements	Ref.
	Biboy Ravanes	1998	1999	—	
2	Willie Generalao	1999	2001	—	
3	Boyzie Zamar	2000	2001	—	
4	Francis Rodriguez	2001	2001	—	
5	Biboy Simon	2019	2019	—	
6	Bong Melocoton	2019	2019	—	
7	Manuel Torralba, Jr	2019	2019–20	—	
8	John Kallos	2021	2025	—	
9	Ronnie Dojillo	2025	2025	—	
10	John Kallos	2026	2026	—	
11	Gilbert Cole	2026	current	—	

== Notable players ==
=== Individual award winners ===
MPBL Rookie of the Year

- Kyt Jimenez – 2022

=== MPBL All-Star Day ===
All-Star selections

- Pari Llagas – 2020
- Kyt Jimenez – 2022
- Ryan Sual – 2024

=== PBA players ===
Ex-PBA players

- Paul Alvarez (returned to PBA)
- Gabby Espinas
- Norman Gonzales
- Marvin Hayes
- Jeff Viernes

Drafted to PBA

- Kyt Jimenez – 76th overall, season 48

== Season-by-season records ==
League champions
Division champions
Qualified for playoffs
Best regular season record

=== Metropolitan Basketball Association ===
Season	GP	Win	Lost	Pct.
1998	22	11	11	.500
1999	30	10	20	.333
2000				
2001 – First Phase				
2001 – Second Phase				

=== Maharlika Pilipinas Basketball League ===
Records as of the 2026 MPBL season:

Season	Regular season							Playoffs	
Season	Division	Finish	GP	W	L	PCT	GB	Stage	Results
Sarangani Marlins
2019–20; Lakan Season	South	15th	30	1	29	.033	25	Did not qualify	
2022	South	3rd	21	16	5	.762	2	Division quarterfinals	lost vs. Rizal, 0–2
2023	South	10th	28	11	17	.393	12	Did not qualify	
2024	South	12th	28	5	23	.179	16	Did not qualify	
Sarangani Gripper Motorcycle Tire
2025	South	11th	29	10	19	.345	15	Did not qualify	
Sarangani Marlins
2026	South	11th	25	3	22	.120	18	Did not qualify	
All-time regular season record			132	36	96	.273		1 playoff appearance	
All-time playoff record			2	0	2	.000		0 Finals appearances	
All-time overall record			134	36	98	.252		0 championships	
