= Cebu Gems =

- Leagues: MBA (1998–2002)
- Founded: 1998
- History: Cebu Gems; 1998–2001; Cebuana Lhuillier Gems; 2001–2002
- Arena: Cebu Coliseum (1998–2002)
- Location: Cebu City, Philippines
- Team colors: Dark green, navy blue, yellow, white
- Head coach: Leoncio Tan Jr. Tonichi Yturri

The Cebu Gems, also known as Cebuana Lhuillier Gems, were a professional basketball team in the now-defunct Metropolitan Basketball Association from 1998 to 2002. The team was owned by Jean Henri Lhuillier and played its home games at the Cebu Coliseum.

== History ==
=== Cebu Gems (MBA, 1998–2000) ===
The Gems had former national player Leoncio Tan, Jr as their first coach. He was replaced by former PBA player Tonichi Yturri during the inaugural season of the Metropolitan Basketball Association in 1998. Yturri would remain coach of the Cebu Gems until the final MBA season in 2002. Among the players in their first season were Michael Manigo, a 5'7" guard out of Cebu Doctors College, Dondon Hontiveros who won the MBA Discovery of the year award, Rob Wainwright, Rob Duat, Chris Tan, Chris Mendoza, Jan Montalbo, Stephen Padilla and Rudy Enterina. The Gems were able to take the Negros Slashers to a seventh game in the Southern Conference finals.

The following year, the Gems added the likes of Homer Se and Edwin Manabat to the lineup. They lost to Iloilo Megavoltz for the Visayas division title. With the acquisition of Matt Mitchell and Kenny Evans, the Gems made it to the national finals against the Manila Metrostars. Cebu lost in six games to Manila.

In 2000, the Gems finished on top of the Southern Conference with 10 wins and two losses. They lost to Negros Slashers, three games to one, in the finals for the Southern Conference title.

=== Cebuana Lhuillier (2001–2002) ===
The team was now known as Cebuana Lhuillier Gems. In the first phase of the 2001 MBA season, the Gems finished the eliminations with 10 wins and four losses, tied with Andok's-San Juan Knights and Negros Slashers. They lost to Negros via two-game sweep in the semifinal series. They lost again to Negros, this time in five games for the Southern Conference title in the MBA second phase tournament.

== 1999 roster ==
1999 Cebu Gems roster
Players
Coaches

Pos.	No.	Nat.	Name	Ht.	Wt.
F	1	(Philippines)	Chris Tan	6 ft 1 in (1.85 m)
F	2	(Philippines)	Richard Caliao	6 ft 3 in (1.91 m)
G	4	(Philippines)	Michael Manigo	5 ft 9 in (1.75 m)
F	5	(United States)	Rob Wainwright	6 ft 5 in (1.96 m)
C	6	(Philippines)	Homer Se	6 ft 5 in (1.96 m)
G	7	(Philippines)	Dondon Hontiveros	6 ft 2 in (1.88 m)
G	8	(Philippines)	Juvanille Yu	6 ft 0 in (1.83 m)
G	9	(Philippines)	Stephen Padilla	5 ft 10 in (1.78 m)
F	12	(Philippines)	Leode Garcia	6 ft 3 in (1.91 m)
C	15	(Philippines)	Nilo Quirante	6 ft 4 in (1.93 m)
F	16	(Philippines)	Michael Almonte	6 ft 3 in (1.91 m)
C	19	(Philippines)	Jan Montalbo	6 ft 4 in (1.93 m)
F	21	(Philippines)	Edwin Manabat	6 ft 3 in (1.91 m)
F	31	(Philippines)	Giovanni Pineda	6 ft 6 in (1.98 m)
F/C	34	(United States)	Matt Mitchell	6 ft 7 in (2.01 m)

Head coach

- Jose Antonio Yturri (La Salle Manila)

Assistant coach(es)

- Hilario Villanil
- Glenn Yusingco

Legend

- (C) Team captain
- Injured

== Other notable players ==
- Rob Duat
- Chris Mendoza
- Rudy Enterina
- Matt Mitchell
- Kenny Evans
- Chris de Jesus
- Roy Lura
- Marc Pingris
