= Negros Slashers =

- Leagues: MBA (1998–2002)
- Founded: 1998
- History: Negros Slashers; 1998–2001; RCPI-Negros Slashes; 2002
- Arena: La Salle Coliseum
- Location: Bacolod, Negros Occidental, Philippines
- Team colors: Navy blue, Light blue, White and Red
- President: Oscar Bascon, Babes Alvarez
- Head coach: Rolly Buenaflor (1998), Junel Baculi (1998), Jun Noel (1998–2001), Robert Sison (2001–2002), Jojo Villapando (2002)
- Championships: 1 (2002)

The Negros Slashers, also known as the RCPI-Negros Slashers, were a professional basketball team in the Metropolitan Basketball Association from 1998 to 2002. The team enjoyed considerable success, winning the MBA National Championship in 2002, the last season of the league. The team was based in Bacolod, Negros Occidental.

== History ==
=== 1998: inaugural season ===
The team was named "Slashers" based on the cane knives' slashing motion used by itinerant sugar workers to cut sugarcane stalks. Bacolod businessmen Oscar "Dodong" Bascon and Babes Alvarez painstakingly formed the team composed of amateur standouts, mostly from the Visayas-Mindanao leagues and former professional players from the Philippine Basketball Association. Ronnie "DJ" Dejarlo was the first player to sign a contract with the team. Among the players that formed the team were Maui Huelar, Erwin Framo, Johnedel Cardel, John Ferriols, Allen Sasan and Jack Tanuan. Negrense Rolly Buenaflor was named as head coach.

The Negros Slashers played their first two games on the road against the Batangas Blades and Manila Metrostars, losing on both occasions. Rolly Buenaflor was relieved of head coaching duties shortly after and was replaced by Junel Baculi. Tragedy struck the team on the eve of their third game in Cebu City when their main player, DJ Dejarlo, was found dead in hotel room due to pancreatitis. Fueled by Dejarlo's unexpected death, the Slashers won their first game against eventual archrival Cebu Gems. Since then, the Slashers found their winning ways and became one of Southern Conference's formidable teams. But Baculi left the team before the second round of eliminations and was replaced by Cebuano coach Jun Noel. The team also signed up Palarong Pambansa standouts Reynel Hugnatan, Ryan Gamboa and Leo Bat-og to bolster their frontline.

They were able to barge in the National Playoffs and faced the Cebu Gems in the first Southern Conference Finals, marred by numerous fan incidents on and off court. They won the series 4-3 and went on to face the Pampanga Dragons. But luck worn out on them as the more experienced Dragons (bannered by former PBA MVP Ato Agustin) won the first MBA National Championship. Negros Slashers team captain John Ferriols was named the inaugural season's Most Valuable Player.

The Negros Slashers were grouped together with the Cebu Gems, Iloilo Volts, Davao Eagles, Socsargen Marlins and Cagayan de Oro Nuggets in the Southern Conference division.

=== 1999: Sophomore Season Jinx ===
Things looked rosy for the Negros Slashers after winning the Southern Conference crown and finishing runner-up to MBA National Champions Pampanga Dragons. They got the right to host the first MBA All Star game which pitted teams from the North Conference against teams from the Southern Conference. John Ferriols, Jack Tanuan and Johnedel Cardel proudly represented the Slashers for the South team. During the offseason, the management held tryouts for MBA players who were released by their mother teams. Among the new recruits for the Slashers were center Mike Otto, former Iloilo Volts forward Judge Primero, former PBA veterans Romy dela Rosa and Roel Bravo. Former Pangasinan Presidents head coach Robert Sison was also hired as the team's assistant coach for Jun Noel.

The second season opened for the Slashers with them hosting the opening ceremonies for the Southern Conference in Bacolod City. However, they were beaten by the new-look Iloilo Megavoltz (headlined by new recruit Vince Hizon) in their first game for the new season. But the Slashers quickly bounced back by winning successive games against their closest rivals. With the Visayas division title at stake, the Slashers tried to qualify for a finals berth but were beaten to it by rivals Cebu Gems and Iloilo Megavoltz, who eventually won the Visayas division crown.

During the season's second round of elimination, the Slashers roster underwent a major revamp following the exit of star center Jack Tanuan, who suffered a kidney disease which left him blind in the right eye. The Slashers management traded back-up center Mike Otto to Pasig Rizal Pirates in exchange for bruiser Lito Aguilar, promoted back-up center Reynel Hugnatan to starter status, and recruited 2 Fil-foreigners in 6-1 combo guard Dean Labayen (who was originally scheduled to play for Barangay Ginebra in the PBA) and 6-8 center Dorian Pena. Both players traced their roots to Negros Occidental. But Labayen only played until the first game of the semifinal round as the Bureau of Immigration cracked down on Fil-foreigner players who were found to be fake or lacking work documents.

The new-look Slashers were able to bamboozle their way through the elimination round but momentum slipped for them when they faced their archrivals the Cebu Gems in the semifinals. The Gems paraded 6-9 Fil-Am Matt Mitchell as counterpart to Pena. The bigger and more skilled Mitchell teamed up with Cebu's main gunner Dondon Hontiveros to lead the Gems against the Slashers en route to the Southern Conference Finals vs the Iloilo Megavoltz.

=== 2000–2001: Return to the Finals ===
With the Slashers losing their Southern Conference title to their bitter rivals, they released Lito Aguilar, hometown players Nonoy Sayon and Ryan Gamboa, Dean Labayen and Dorian Pena, during the offseason. They signed up Dennis Madrid, Ruben dela Rosa, Cid White from Nueva Ecija Patriots, and Alvin Teng from the Laguna Lakers.

A controversial coaching change happened midway in the first round of eliminations when the long-time coach Jun Noel was replaced by assistant Robert Sison. Although the change was welcomed by most Negros fans, there was a rejection coming from one of the disgruntled owners of the franchise. The conflict was resolved when Sison started winning games with the team.

The Slashers were able to avenge the bitter defeat they experienced in the recent Southern Conference Finals against the Cebu Gems. The Slashers faced a tall team in San Juan Knights in the 3rd MBA National Finals, but despite possessing quickness, they were overpowered by the Knights in six games.

Prior to the season, the Slashers were merged with the Iloilo Megavoltz as part of the league's streamlining operations. As the Megavoltz team disbanded, the Slashers were able to sign up its former player Michael Almonte. The team also released Alvin Teng. The decision was made owing to his sub-par performance during Game 4 of the MBA Championship Series against the San Juan Knights.

The team relied heavily on its regular rotation of Ferriols, Cardel, Huelar, Bat-og, Hugnatan, brothers Romy and Ruben dela Rosa, White and newly acquired Dino Aldeguer. Just like the previous season, the Slashers handily won the Southern Conference Championship, this time against the TPG-Davao Eagles. In their third trip to the MBA National Finals, the Slashers faced the LBC Batangas Blades, but lost in four games.

=== 2002: MBA Crossover Champions/National Champions, final season ===
In 2002, TV broadcast partner ABS-CBN withdrew its support and funding for the league. As a result, the league had to be commercialized, allowing teams to look for sponsors. Negros Slashers found one in remittance company RCPI and was renamed the RCPI Negros Slashers, barely 2 weeks before the season started. Robert Sison resigned as head coach and was replaced by Joshua Villapando. The roster underwent a major revamp as long-time Negros Slasher Johnedel Cardel left the team. New faces in the team included Carlito Espiritu, Jose Francisco, Tyrone Bautista and 6'10" Vincent San Diego.

The Slashers became the dominant team in a league that was reeling from heavy financial losses. It was able to capture the MBA first conference title (dubbed as Crossover Conference) where they exacted revenge on their rival in last year's National Finals, the Batangas Blades. At the same time, their championship was dedicated to former player Jack Tanuan who died on April 4, 2002, after battling a kidney disease.

The league stopped operations on July 26, 2002. There was no MBA National Champion declared for the season, the Crossover Conference championship won by Negros Slashers was considered an official MBA title.

== 1999 roster ==
Negros Slashers roster
Players
Coaches

Pos.	No.	Nat.	Name	Ht.	Wt.
G	3	(Philippines)	Johnedel Cardel	5 ft 11 in (1.80 m)
G	4	(Philippines)	Richard Cabrera	6 ft 1 in (1.85 m)
G	14	(Philippines)	John Philip Lim	5 ft 7 in (1.70 m)
G	9	(Philippines)	Ruel Bravo	5 ft 8 in (1.73 m)
G	10	(Philippines)	Erwin Framo	6 ft 1 in (1.85 m)
G	15	(Philippines)	Manuel Huelar	5 ft 10 in (1.78 m)
F	18	(Philippines)	Leo Bat-Og	6 ft 4 in (1.93 m)
C	21	(Philippines)	Reynel Hugnatan	6 ft 4 in (1.93 m)
F	22	(Philippines)	John Ferriols	6 ft 4 in (1.93 m)
C	29	(Philippines)	Michael Otto	6 ft 5 in (1.96 m)
C	41	(Philippines)	Jack Tanuan	6 ft 5 in (1.96 m)
F	57	(Philippines)	Romeo dela Rosa	6 ft 2 in (1.88 m)

Head coach

- Agripino Noel

Assistant coach(es)

- Rolly Buenaflor

Legend

- (C) Team captain
- Injured

== Other notable players ==
- Michael Almonte
- Ronnie Dejarlo†
- Reuben dela Rosa
- Dean Labayen
- Dennis Madrid
- Mike Manigo
- Dorian Peña
- Judge Primero
- Eulo Regala
- Aldrich Reyes
- Cid White #4
- James Yap
- Carlito Espiritu

=== Retired numbers ===
- 7 - DJ Dejarlo
- 41 - Jack Tanuan
