= Batangas Blades =

- Leagues: MBA (1998–2002); PBL (2002–2003)
- Founded: 1998
- Dissolved: 2003
- History: Batangas Blades; 1998–2001; LBC-Batangas Blades; 2001–2003
- Arena: De La Salle Lipa SENTRUM; 1998–2001; Lipa City Convention Center; 2001
- Location: Batangas, Philippines
- Team colors: Black, red, yellow and white
- Head coach: Nash Racela
- Championships: 1 MBA National Championship

The Batangas Blades (or the LBC-Batangas Blades) were a professional basketball team of the now-defunct Metropolitan Basketball Association from 1998 to 2002.

Its moniker was taken from the province's popularity in making Balisong (a Filipino-made knife). It also played for a short time in the Philippine Basketball League after the MBA folded in 2002.

The team played its home games at the De La Salle Lipa SENTRUM from 1998 to 2001 and at the Lipa City Convention Center in 2002. The PBL version of the Blades also played a number of games at both venues. To compensate the loss of the Manila Metrostars after both clubs' merger, the Blades played a few home games in Manila's Mail and More Sports Complex (now San Andres Gym).

== History ==
=== Metropolitan Basketball Association ===
==== 1998-2000 ====
In 1998, the Metropolitan Basketball Association was formed as a regional-based professional league which also challenged the commercial Philippine Basketball Association. The Blades were paraded in their first season by former Adamson Falcons players Eddie Laure, Dennis Madrid, former La Salle Green Archer and part-time comedian Maui Roca and Jeff Sanders. The Blades were owned by delivery giant LBC of Santi Araneta.

Laure became the Blades' star player but the team had a disappointing 10-12 win-loss slate despite a late push for the playoffs. Despite Ralph Rivera and Fil-Am Stephen Antonio's arrival in 1999, the Blades went 12-18 and lost in three games to the San Juan Knights in the Northern Conference Wild-Card series.

In 2000, Batangas missed the playoffs with a 12-14 record.

==== 2001-2002: Batangas-Manila merger ====
In 2001, the Blades and the 1999 MBA National Champion Manila Metrostars were merged into a single team, retaining the Batangas Blades name. With the merger, the team became a stronger squad with Eddie Laure, Jeffrey Sanders and Metrostar superstars 2000 MBA MVP Rommel Adducul and Alex Compton. They also added LBC to its team name, making it the LBC-Batangas Blades.

The Blades became the team to beat in the Northern Conference, compiling an 11–3 win–loss record in the first phase of the MBA season, but lost to the Andok's-San Juan Knights in the playoffs. During the second phase of the tournament, which was for the MBA National Championship, the Blades recorded another 11-3 record but this time edged the Knights 3-1 in the Northern Finals to enter their first finals appearance in history. The Blades defeated the Negros Slashers, 3-1 to win their first MBA national title. Laure was named as the MVP of the 2001 season.

In the 2002 season, Batangas lost Adducul to the returning Pangasinan Waves but made its return trip to the finals after scoring a huge upset over the top team in the North, the Olongapo Volunteers, in a one-game match for the finals spot. The Blades then lost to the Slashers via a three-game sweep in the First Conference of the season. The MBA National tournament was played but was later discounted due to the folding of the MBA.

=== Philippine Basketball League ===
After the closure of the MBA, Batangas joined the amateur commercial league Philippine Basketball League. The team had Alex Compton and Jeff Sanders, but did not have the old Blades squad they had in the MBA as Laure played for the Welcoat Paintmasters. Instead, the team added some amateur players on their squad such as St. Benilde Blazers tandem of Al Magpayo and Ronald Capati and NU Bulldog Froilan Baguion. The team did retain the LBC-Batangas Blades name as the team placed fourth in the 2002 PBL Challenge Cup. In the 2003 PBL Unity Cup, the Blades did not make it to the semifinals, as the team disbanded for good.

=== Uniforms ===
In 1998, the Blades was the first game uniform design the colors were red, black and white it also contains the Blades logo with LBC script logo in the left during the first season. In 1999, the Blades was another replaced by the Blades script logo. By 2000 season the Blades was the road uniform it was color black, it was Batangas with LBC logo in the lower until early 2001. In 2001, the Blades was contains the LBC logo with the logo in the left until moves to the PBL in 2003.

=== Home Arenas ===
- Sentrum (1998-2001)
- Lipa City Convention Center (2002-2003)

== 1999 Roster ==
Batangas Blades roster
Players
Coaches

Pos.	No.	Nat.	Name	Ht.	Wt.
F	1	(Philippines)	Tyrone Bautista	6 ft 2 in (1.88 m)
F	2	(Philippines)	Cornelio Manucat	6 ft 0 in (1.83 m)
F	5	(Philippines)	Juan Augusto Ramirez	6 ft 3 in (1.91 m)
G	6	(Philippines)	Ralph Emerson Rivera	6 ft 0 in (1.83 m)
G	9	(Philippines)	Dennis Madrid	5 ft 9 in (1.75 m)
F	11	(Philippines)	Eddie Laure	6 ft 3 in (1.91 m)
F	12	(Philippines)	Maoi Roca	6 ft 4 in (1.93 m)
G	14	(Philippines)	Matthew Makalintal	5 ft 8 in (1.73 m)
F	15	(Philippines)	Bernard de Guia	6 ft 3 in (1.91 m)
F	17	(United States)	Jeffrey Sanders	6 ft 3 in (1.91 m)
C	22	(Philippines)	Arnold Gamboa	6 ft 6 in (1.98 m)
F	28	(Philippines)	Terry Saldana	6 ft 3 in (1.91 m)

Head coach

- Salvador Ramos

Assistant coach(es)

- Raoul Cesar Racela
- Eric Gonzales

Legend

- (C) Team captain
- Injured

== Other notable players ==
- Rommel Adducul
- Oliver Agapito
- Stephen Antonio
- Rudolf Belmonte
- Alex Compton
- Chris Corbin
- Jayson Cuevas
- Rommel David
- Jonjit Duremdes
- Tony Boy Espinosa
- Peter Martin
- Henry Ong
- Jonathan "Chu-Chu" Serrano
- Radel Mapalad
