= Manila Metrostars =

- Leagues: MBA (1998-2001)
- Founded: 1998
- Folded: 2001
- History: Manila Metrostars; 1998-2001
- Arena: Mail and More Arena
- Location: Manila, Philippines
- Team colors: blue, navy blue and white
- Championships: 1 MBA National Championship

The Manila Metrostars were a professional basketball team in the now-defunct Metropolitan Basketball Association from 1998 to 2001. The team was the 1999 MBA National Champions and holds the MBA record of winning 22 consecutive games during the said season. The team was merged with the Batangas Blades in the 2001 season. In 1998, the Metrostars played home games at numerous venues such as the Ninoy Aquino Stadium, the Ateneo Blue Eagle Gym, Rizal Memorial Coliseum and a host of others before playing permanently at the Mail and More Arena (now San Andres Gym).

== History ==
In 1998, the Metropolitan Basketball Association was formed as a regional-based professional league which also challenged the commercial Philippine Basketball Association (PBA). The Metrostars made a major steal when they acquired two-time NCAA MVP Rommel Adducul straight out of the San Sebastian College - Recoletos, who most assumed would join the PBA. The team then built around him with shooting guard Alex Compton, an American citizen who was born in the Philippines. Others on that team included ex-PBA veterans Peter Martin, Frechie Ang, Ruben Dela Rosa and former Far Eastern University star Nestor Echano.

In their inaugural season, the Metrostars were coached by Ricky Dandan but lost to the eventual champion Pampanga Dragons in the Northern Conference Finals, 4–2. In 1999, Letran Knights head coach Louie Alas took over the reins as head coach while adding former PBL and Cebu native Gilbert Demape. The Metrostars had an early 4–2 record, but went on an unprecedented 22-game winning run before finishing the elimination phase with a 26–4 record. The Metrostars dethroned the Dragons in the Northern semis before beating the Pasig-Rizal Pirates in the Northern Conference finals. In the National Finals against the Cebu Gems, the Metrostars won their only MBA National title, 4–2. One of the memorable games during the series was a three-overtime shootout between Compton and Cebu's Dondon Hontiveros before Manila won the game on the road. Compton was named as the 1999 league MVP and Alas won Coach of the Year.

The Metrostars failed to defend their MBA crown in 2000 as they lost to the San Juan Knights in the Northern Conference Finals. In 2001, the Metrostars and the Batangas Blades agreed on a merger, retaining the Blades name. This eliminated the Manila Metrostars franchise as Adducul (the MVP of the 2000 season), Compton and a few holdovers from the squad joined the Blades.

== Uniforms ==
In 1998, the Metrostars was the first official game uniforms the color was blue green, red and white contains the team logo during the inaugural season of the league. In 1999, the team replaced by blue, navy blue and white contains the logo were used their won the National Championship team in that jerseys. From year 2000 season, the Metrostars was used the alternate jersey with LBC logo and also the team logo in the left that was used before the merger with Batangas Blades in 2001.

== Home arenas ==
- Ninoy Aquino Stadium (1998)
- Rizal Memorial Coliseum (1998)
- Mail and More Arena (now San Andres Gym) (1999–2000)
- Blue Eagle Gym (1998–2000)

== Notable players ==
- Rommel Adducul
- Freche Ang
- Jojo Brines
- Augustus Ceasar Brown
- Don Camaso
- Nonoy Chuatico
- Joel Co
- Alex Compton
- Reuben dela Rosa
- Gilbert Demape
- Nestor Echano
- Erwin Framo
- Nandy Garcia
- Alrich Jareño
- Jasper Javier
- June Longalong
- Dino Manuel
- Peter Martin
- Cadel Mosqueda
- Lino Ong
- Jonathan "Chuchu" Serrano
- Chito Victolero

Coaching Staff:

- Ricky Dandan
- Louie Alas
- Nonoy Chuatico
- Alan Altamirano
- Ariel Vanguardia
- Cesar Pohlen
- Boyzie Zamar
- Aldrin Cruz
