= Bill Bayno =

American basketball coach (born 1962)

APR
- Title: Assistant coach
- League: BAL; RBL

Personal information
- Born: May 18, 1962 (age 64) Goshen, New York, U.S.
- Listed height: 6 ft 2 in (1.88 m)

Career information
- High school: John S. Burke Catholic (Goshen, New York)
- College: UMass (1980–1982); Sacred Heart (1982–1985)
- Position: Guard
- Coaching career: 1985–present

Career history

Coaching
- 1985–1986: Seton Hall (assistant)
- 1986–1987: Kansas (assistant)
- 1987–1988: Baptist College (assistant)
- 1988–1995: UMass (assistant)
- 1995–2000: UNLV
- 2000–2001: Phoenix Eclipse
- 2001–2002: Talk 'N Text Phone Pals
- 2002–2003: Yakima Sun Kings
- 2005–2008: Portland Trail Blazers (assistant)
- 2008–2009: Loyola Marymount
- 2009–2011: Portland Trail Blazers (assistant)
- 2011–2013: Minnesota Timberwolves (assistant)
- 2013–2015: Toronto Raptors (assistant)
- 2016–2021: Indiana Pacers (assistant)
- 2021–2023: Detroit Pistons (assistant)
- 2024–present: APR (assistant)

Career highlights
- As head coach: CBA champion (2003); WAC tournament champion (1998); MWC regular season champion (2000); MWC tournament champion (2000); MWC Coach of the Year (2000)

Bill Bayno (born May 18, 1962) is an American basketball coach, who currently serves as assistant coach for the APR of the Rwanda Basketball League (RBL). He was the men's basketball head coach at Loyola Marymount University from 2008 to 2009, resigning for medical reasons. He was also the head coach of the UNLV Runnin' Rebels men's basketball team from 1995 through 2000.

== Early life and playing career ==
Bayno grew up in Goshen, New York, where he was an all-county, all-city and Daily News all-star selection in basketball at John S. Burke Catholic High School. His father, Joe Bayno, was head basketball coach at Burke. He graduated in 1980 and went on to play guard for the University of Massachusetts under coaches Ray Wilson and Tom McLaughlin from 1980 to 1982.

He transferred to Sacred Heart University where he helped the Pioneers to two Division II tournaments and earned selection as a Division II All-American. After graduating in 1985, Bayno was invited to rookie camp with the NBA's New York Knicks as a free agent, but did not make the team.

== Early coaching career ==
After graduating from Sacred Heart, Bayno had written 100 form letters to coaches throughout the country, asking for a chance to work as a graduate assistant. P. J. Carlesimo, who had met Bayno working summer basketball camps, was the only one who responded with an offer. Bayno served as a graduate assistant under Carleismo at Seton Hall for the 1985–86 season. He was responsible for underclass recruiting and served as co-director of the Pirate Basketball School. Bayno then served during the 1986–87 season as a graduate assistant coach at Kansas under head coach Larry Brown.

Bayno earned his first job as a full-time assistant coach at Baptist College, now known as Charleston Southern. Working under head coach Gary Edwards, Bayno helped lead the Buccaneers to a 17–12 record.

Bayno moved on after the season, returning to UMass where he served as assistant coach from 1988 to 1995 under head coach John Calipari. He played a key role in the team's rise to national prominence. During Bayno's tenure the Minutemen made five consecutive trips to the NCAA Tournament and advanced to the 1995 regional finals. A year after his departure, UMass reached the Final Four in 1996.

== UNLV ==
On March 30, 1995, at age 32, Bayno was hired to succeed Tim Grgurich as the men's head coach at UNLV with an annual salary of $600,000. Bayno had a successful career there, with the Runnin' Rebels earning NCAA Tournament bids in 1998 and 2000, and winning four conference championships. During his tenure, Bayno's UNLV teams logged a 94–65 record, making him the third-winningest coach in the school's history.

In 1996–97, Bayno's second season at the helm, the Rebels went 22–10 and reached the third round of the 1997 NIT, which marked the program's first postseason appearance since the 1992–93 season. The 22 wins more than doubled his first season's win total and were the most at UNLV since 1991–92. Following the season, UNLV signed Bayno to a new five-year contract through the 2002–03 season.

However, in 2000 UNLV was subject to NCAA sanctions for recruiting violations. The penalties included a one-year team suspension from the 2000–01 postseason, and the basketball program was placed on probation for four years. The allegations focused on the 1996 and 1997 recruitment of Lamar Odom, who the NCAA determined had received $5,400 in cash and improper benefits from David Chapman, a Las Vegas-area dentist and UNLV booster who was also a friend of Bayno. Odom was ultimately denied admission and went on to play for Rhode Island for one year before jumping to the NBA.

Although the NCAA's report did not implicate Bayno, and he denied any involvement in or knowledge of the transgressions, he was nonetheless fired by UNLV on December 12, 2000. School officials cited a provision in his contract that stated he could be fired if he knew about any NCAA violations. The NCAA officially cleared Bayno of any wrongdoing, and he sued the university for money owed him for the balance of the 2000–01 season and the final two years on his contract. He eventually received a $400,000 out-of-court settlement. His attorney was Steve Owens who had also defended Missouri's basketball coach Norm Stewart in an NCAA investigation.

== Post-UNLV career ==
After leaving UNLV, Bayno coached the Phoenix Eclipse of the American Basketball Association, the Talk 'N Text Phone Pals of the Philippine Basketball Association, and the Yakima Sun Kings of the Continental Basketball Association, leading the Sun Kings to the CBA championship in 2003.

During his one-year stint in the Philippines, Bayno was fined a league-record $6,000 for his public allegations of game-fixing against the four teams that finished at the top of the PBA standings. All four teams shared common ownership.

In 2005, former Portland Trail Blazers coach Maurice Cheeks was fired by the team, and Tim Grgurich, who was then the Trail Blazers' assistant coach for player development, quit the team in protest. Interim Blazers head coach Kevin Pritchard, whom Bayno had coached and mentored while at Kansas, hired Bayno for the position—the second time in Bayno's career that he had served as Grgurich's replacement.

Before the 2008–09 college basketball season, Bayno accepted the head coaching position at Loyola Marymount University in Los Angeles, California. In January 2009, the Loyola Marymount University athletic department announced that Bayno had resigned from the program due to health issues, and would be replaced by interim coach Max Good. In February 2009, Bayno rejoined the Trail Blazers as an assistant coach under Nate McMillan.

On September 15, 2011, Bayno joined the Minnesota Timberwolves coaching staff under head coach Rick Adelman. In July 2013, Bayno joined the Toronto Raptors coaching staff under head coach Dwane Casey.

On June 27, 2016, Bayno was hired by the Indiana Pacers as an assistant coach. He resigned in February 2021 due to health issues. On June 15, 2021, Bayno was hired by the Detroit Pistons as an assistant coach.

In December 2023, Bayno was hired by Rwandan club APR as an assistant coach under Maz Trakh.

== Head coaching record ==
=== College ===
Record table
Season	Team	Overall	Conference	Standing	Postseason
UNLV Runnin' Rebels (Big West Conference) (1995–1996)
1995–96	UNLV	10–16	7–11	9th	
UNLV Runnin' Rebels (Western Athletic Conference) (1996–1999)
1996–97	UNLV	22–10	11–5	3rd (Pacific)	NIT Quarterfinal
1997–98	UNLV	20–13	7–7	5th (Mountain)	NCAA Division I First Round
1998–99	UNLV	16–13	9–5	1st (Mountain)	NIT First Round
UNLV Runnin' Rebels (Mountain West Conference) (1999–2000)
1999–00	UNLV	23–8	10–4	T–1st	NCAA Division I First Round
2000–01	UNLV	3–4	0–0		
UNLV:		94–60	44–32		
Loyola Marymount Lions (West Coast Conference) (2008–2009)
2008–09	Loyola Marymount	0–3	0–0		
Loyola Marymount:		0–3	0–0		
Total:		94–63			
National champion Postseason invitational champion Conference regular season champion Conference regular season and conference tournament champion Division regular season champion Division regular season and conference tournament champion Conference tournament champion

=== Philippine Basketball Association record ===
Season	Team	Conference	Elims./Clas. round					Playoffs				
Season	Team	Conference	GP	W	L	PCT	Finish	PG	W	L	PCT	Results
2002	TNT	Governors Cup	11	9	2	.818	1st	2	0	2	.000	Lost to San Miguel in quarterfinals with twice-to-beat advantage
2002	TNT	Commissioner's Cup	10	5	5	.500	7th	14	8	6	.571	Lost to Red Bull in finals
Career Total			21	14	7	.666	Playoff Total	16	8	8	.500	0 championship
