= 2002 PBA Governors' Cup =

- Duration: February 10 – May 26, 2002
- TV partner(s): Viva TV on IBC

Finals
- Champions: Purefoods TJ Hotdogs
- Runners-up: Alaska Aces

Awards
- Best Player: Rey Evangelista (Purefoods TJ Hotdogs)
- Best Import: Derrick Brown (Purefoods TJ Hotdogs)
- Finals MVP: Kerby Raymundo (Purefoods TJ Hotdogs)

PBA Governors' Cup chronology
- < 2001 2011 >

PBA conference chronology
- < 2001 Governors' 2002 Commissioner's >

The 2002 Philippine Basketball Association (PBA) Governors' Cup, also known as the 2002 Samsung-PBA Governors' Cup for sponsorship reasons, was the first conference of the 2002 PBA season. It started on February 10 and ended on May 26, 2002. The tournament requires two imports per each team.

== Rule changes ==
To prepare the national team for the upcoming 2002 Asian Games in Busan, South Korea, the following FIBA rules were adopted for this conference:

- Zone defense will be allowed.
- Total time of the game would be reduced to 40 minutes, 10-minute quarters.
- The time allowed for an offensive team to cross the halfcourt line was reduced from 10 to eight seconds.

In addition, the pool of the national team was distributed into two teams: the Selecta-RP team and the Hapee-RP team.

== Imports ==
Each team were allowed two imports. The first line in the table are the original reinforcements of the teams. Below the name are the replacement of the import above. Same with the third replacement that is also highlighted with a different color. GP is the number of games played.

Team	Name	GP	Name	GP
Alaska Aces	Muntrelle Dobbins	7	Ron Riley	24
Alaska Aces	James Head	17		
Barangay Ginebra Kings	Bubba Wells	3	Jarrod Gee	11
Barangay Ginebra Kings	Desmond Ferguson	3		
Barangay Ginebra Kings	Bryan Green	5		
Batang Red Bull Thunder	Joe Bunn	11	Julius Nwosu	10
Batang Red Bull Thunder	Sean Lampley	1	Antonio Lang	2
Coca Cola Tigers	Fred Williams	4	Rosell Ellis	18
Coca Cola Tigers	Ron Hale	14		
FedEx Express	Rodrick Rhodes	2	Jermaine Walker	12
FedEx Express	Tim Moore	10		
Purefoods TJ Hotdogs	Leonard White	11	Derrick Brown	24
Purefoods TJ Hotdogs	Kelvin Price	13		
San Miguel Beermen	Keith Hill	2	Lamont Strothers	19
San Miguel Beermen	Mario Bennett	17		
Shell Turbo Chargers	Derrick Grimm	3	Askia Jones	11
Shell Turbo Chargers	Nantambu Willingham	7		
Shell Turbo Chargers	Cedric Webber	1		
Sta. Lucia Realtors	Lelan McDougal	3	Johnny Taylor	1
Sta. Lucia Realtors	Mark Davis	9	Victor Thomas	11
Talk 'N Text Phone Pals	Jerald Honeycutt	13	Richie Frahm	13

== Elimination round ==
=== Team standings ===
Pos	Team	W	L	PCT	GB	Qualification
1	Talk 'N Text Phone Pals	9	2	.818	—	Twice-to-beat in the quarterfinals
2	Coca-Cola Tigers	8	3	.727 (Note: Head-to-head record: Coca-Cola 1–0 Purefoods)	1	Twice-to-beat in the quarterfinals
3	Purefoods TJ Hotdogs	8	3	.727	1	Twice-to-beat in the quarterfinals
4	Alaska Aces	6	5	.545 (Note: Head-to-head differential: Alaska +9, FedEx +6, Red Bull −15)	3	Twice-to-beat in the quarterfinals
5	FedEx Express	6	5	.545	3	Twice-to-win in the quarterfinals
6	Batang Red Bull Thunder	6	5	.545	3	Twice-to-win in the quarterfinals
7	Sta. Lucia Realtors	5	6	.455 (Note: Head-to-head record: Sta. Lucia 1–0 San Miguel)	4	Twice-to-win in the quarterfinals
8	San Miguel Beermen	5	6	.455	4	Twice-to-win in the quarterfinals
9	RP-Hapee Toothpaste (G)	4	7	.364 (Note: Head-to-head record: Hapee 1–0 Selecta)	5	
10	RP-Selecta Ice Cream (G)	4	7	.364	5	
11	Barangay Ginebra Kings	3	8	.273	6	
12	Shell Turbo Chargers	2	9	.182	7	

Source: PBA.ph
(G) Guests

== Bracket ==
Quarterfinals (Top 4 twice-to-beat)
1	Talk 'N Text	70	70
8	San Miguel	79	81
4	Alaska	74
5	FedEx	71
2	Coca Cola	75
7	Sta. Lucia	65
3	Purefoods	82
6	Red Bull	77

Semifinals (Best-of-5)
8	San Miguel	2
4	Alaska	3
2	Coca Cola	2
3	Purefoods	3

Finals (Best-of-7)
4	Alaska	3
3	Purefoods	4
Third place playoff
8	San Miguel	63
2	Coca Cola	75

== Quarterfinals ==
=== (1) Talk 'N Text vs. (8) San Miguel ===
Viva TV

April 23

recap

Talk 'N Text Phone Pals 70, San Miguel Beermen 79

Cuneta Astrodome, Pasay

Viva TV

April 28

recap

Talk 'N Text Phone Pals 70, San Miguel Beermen 81
San Miguel wins series in two games

Araneta Coliseum, Quezon City

=== (2) Coca-Cola vs. (7) Sta. Lucia ===
Viva TV

April 27

recap

Coca Cola Tigers 75, Sta. Lucia Realtors 65
Coca-Cola wins series in one game

Araneta Coliseum, Quezon City

=== (3) Purefoods vs. (6) Red Bull ===
Viva TV

April 27

Purefoods TJ Hotdogs 82, Batang Red Bull Thunder 77
Purefoods wins series in one game

Araneta Coliseum, Quezon City

=== (4) Alaska vs. (5) FedEx ===
Viva TV

April 25

recap

Alaska Aces 74, FedEx Express 71
Alaska wins series in one game

Philsports Arena, Pasig

== Semifinals ==
=== (2) Purefoods vs. (3) Coca-Cola ===
Viva TV

April 30

Purefoods TJ Hotdogs 89, Coca Cola Tigers 86

Cuneta Astrodome, Pasay

Viva TV

May 2

Purefoods TJ Hotdogs 84, Coca Cola Tigers 75

Philsports Arena, Pasig

Viva TV

May 5

recap

Purefoods TJ Hotdogs 72, Coca Cola Tigers 77

Araneta Coliseum, Quezon City

Viva TV

May 7

Purefoods TJ Hotdogs 59, Coca Cola Tigers 64

Araneta Coliseum, Quezon City

Viva TV

May 9

recap

Purefoods TJ Hotdogs 78, Coca Cola Tigers 75
Purefoods wins series, 3–2

Philsports Arena, Pasig

=== (4) Alaska vs. (8) San Miguel ===
Viva TV

April 30

Alaska Aces 66, San Miguel Beermen 72

Cuneta Astrodome, Pasay

Viva TV

May 2

recap

Alaska Aces 67, San Miguel Beermen 63 (OT)

Philsports Arena, Pasig

Viva TV

May 5

Alaska Aces 61, San Miguel Beermen 68

Araneta Coliseum, Quezon City

Viva TV

May 7

recap

Alaska Aces 74, San Miguel Beermen 63

Araneta Coliseum, Quezon City

Viva TV

May 9

Alaska Aces 65, San Miguel Beermen 62
Alaska wins series, 3–2

Philsports Arena, Pasig

== Third place playoff ==
Viva TV

May 12

Coca Cola Tigers 75, San Miguel Beermen 63

Araneta Coliseum, Quezon City

== Finals ==
Viva TV

May 12

Purefoods TJ Hotdogs 73, Alaska Aces 79

Araneta Coliseum, Quezon City

Viva TV

May 14

Purefoods TJ Hotdogs 102, Alaska Aces 106 (2OT)

Araneta Coliseum, Quezon City

Viva TV

May 16

Purefoods TJ Hotdogs 80, Alaska Aces 66

Araneta Coliseum, Quezon City

Viva TV

May 19

Purefoods TJ Hotdogs 82, Alaska Aces 76

Araneta Coliseum, Quezon City

Viva TV

May 21

Purefoods TJ Hotdogs 84, Alaska Aces 72

Araneta Coliseum, Quezon City

Viva TV

May 23

Purefoods TJ Hotdogs 78, Alaska Aces 85

Araneta Coliseum, Quezon City

Viva TV

May 26

Purefoods TJ Hotdogs 91, Alaska Aces 76
Purefoods wins series, 4–3

Araneta Coliseum, Quezon City
