= Chris Calaguio =

Filipino basketball player (born 1975)

Personal information
- Born: December 26, 1975 (age 50) Makati, Philippines
- Listed height: 6 ft 2 in (1.88 m)
- Listed weight: 185 lb (84 kg)

Career information
- High school: San Beda (Manila)
- College: Letran
- PBA draft: 2002: 1st round, 4th overall pick
- Drafted by: Shell Turbo Chargers
- Playing career: 1999–2019
- Position: Shooting guard / small forward

Career history
- 1999–2001: San Juan Knights
- 2002–2005: Shell Turbo Chargers
- 2005–2010: San Miguel Beermen / Magnolia Beverage Masters
- 2019: Marikina Shoemasters

Career highlights
- PBA champion (2009 Fiesta); PBA All-Star (2003); PBA Mr. Quality Minutes (2007); NCAA champion (1998); NCAA Most Valuable Player (1998); NCAA Mythical Five (1998); MBA champion

Christian Jay Calaguio (born December 26, 1975, in Makati, Philippines) is a Filipino former professional basketball player. He last played for the San Miguel Beermen in the Philippine Basketball Association (PBA). He is a former San Beda Red Cub cager and was one of the star players of the Colegio de San Juan de Letran Knights during his college days in the National Collegiate Athletic Association. After playing for the Knights, he went on to play in the defunct Metropolitan Basketball Association as a member of the San Juan Knights.

After the MBA disbanded in 2002, he played for the Shell Turbo Chargers and then with the San Miguel Beermen, where he ended up via the dispersal draft after Shell disbanded as well in 2005.

== High school and college career ==
Calaguio starred for the San Beda Red Cubs in high school, before graduating in 1994. He played under Coach Ato Badolato.

Calaguio then played for the Letran Knights in college, which were the rivals of San Beda. He teamed up with Kerby Raymundo and Aldin Ayo under Coach Louie Alas, and started over Willie Miller. In 1998, he got MVP honors and the championship.

== Professional career ==
=== San Juan Knights (1999–2001) ===
Calaguio first played for the San Juan Knights in the Metropolitan Basketball Association (MBA), where he teamed up with Chito Victolero. In 2000, he won a championship with them.

=== Shell Turbo Chargers (2002–2005) ===
In December 2001, Calaguio applied for the draft. He was drafted fourth overall in the 2002 PBA Draft by the Shell Turbo Chargers. He was then signed to the PBA rookie max of P200,000 per month and P300,000 up to 2005. During the 2002 Governors' Cup, he was loaned to RP-Selecta Ice Cream, along with his teammate Chris Jackson.

In the 2003 All-Filipino Cup, Calaguio exploded with 27 points including a triple with 9.6 seconds remaining as Shell downed the Sta. Lucia Realtors, 78-73, for its fifth win. He was also an All-Star that season, as he replaced Johnny Abarrientos who suffered an injury. He also participated in the PBA's King of the Hardcourt One-on-One showdown, a mini-tournament.

Calaguio then missed some games during the 2004 Fiesta Conference due to a sprained ankle. They made the quarterfinals that conference in an upset over Sta. Lucia, with him making four three-pointers. Shell then left the PBA after that conference.

=== San Miguel Beermen / Magnolia Beverage Masters (2005–2010) ===
After Shell left the PBA, Calaguio was traded for the San Miguel Beermen's Joey Mente. He won the Mr. Quality Minutes award in 2007. However, he became a practice player when San Miguel brought in rookie Bonbon Custodio. Still he was able to win a championship with the Beermen in 2009.

=== Marikina Shoemasters (2019) ===
In 2019, Calaguio got an offer to come out of retirement and play for the Marikina Shoemasters in the Maharlika Pilipinas Basketball League (MPBL). He was able to play 10 games for them. He had 17 points in a loss to the Pampanga Giant Green Lanterns, and 13 points in a win over Navotas Uni-Pak Sardines.

== Coaching career ==
In 2014, Calaguio and fellow PBA ex-pro Jun Marzan became the coaches of Ednas School, a school in Dagupan, Pangasinan. In 2015, they became the coaches for the varsity team of the Philippine College of Science and Technology. In two years, the school became Private Schools Athletic Association (PRISAA) champions in Region I. Calaguio also got to coach Rhenz Abando, and was instrumental in bringing him to UST.

== National team career ==
In 2001, Calaguio was part of the Philippine national team that competed in the fourth edition of the South East Asia Basketball Association (SEABA) men’s basketball championships. That team won that tournament. He also played in that year's SEA Games, and won a gold medal there.

The following year, Calaguio was named to the national team pool for the 2002 Asian Games.

== Personal life ==
Calaguio has a son, Kurt, who is currently studying in Thailand.

== Career statistics ==
Legend
GP	Games played	MPG	Minutes per game
FG%	Field-goal percentage	3P%	3-point field-goal percentage	FT%	Free-throw percentage
RPG	Rebounds per game	APG	Assists per game	SPG	Steals per game
BPG	Blocks per game	PPG	Points per game	**Bold**	Career high

=== PBA ===
Year	Team	GP	MPG	FG%	3P%	FT%	RPG	APG	SPG	BPG	PPG
2002	Shell	20	25.6	.364	.386	.636	2.7	2.3	**.5**	.1	9.0
2003	Shell	35	**31.5**	.392	.305	**.789**	3.1	**2.5**	**.5**	.0	**13.9**
2004–05	Shell	**63**	23.6	.392	.250	.716	**2.8**	1.7	**.5**	.0	9.6
2005–06	San Miguel	43	17.5	**.483**	**.411**	.658	1.7	.9	.3	**.1**	6.3
2006–07	San Miguel	59	20.8	.427	.405	.735	2.0	1.1	.4	.0	8.8
2007–08	Magnolia	24	12.7	.312	.277	.733	1.2	.7	.2	**.1**	2.7
2008–09	San Miguel	17	6.4	.444	.379	.667	.8	.5	.1	.0	3.7
2009–10	San Miguel	6	2.5	.143	.000	.500	.3	.2	.0	.0	0.5
Career		267	20.6	.405	.346	.727	2.1	1.4	.4	0.0	8.2

=== MPBL ===
Year	Team	GP	MPG	FG%	3P%	FT%	RPG	APG	SPG	BPG	PPG
2017–18	Marikina Shoemasters	10	14.1	.380	.367	.864	1.7	1.0	.5	.0	6.8
Career		10	14.1	.380	.367	.864	1.7	1.0	.5	.0	6.8
