= 2002 FedEx Express season =

- Head coach: Derrick Pumaren
- General manager: Lito Alvarez
- Owners: Bert Lina; FedEx Philippines

Governors' Cup results
- Record: 6–10 (37.5%)
- Place: 5th seed
- Playoff finish: Semifinals

Commissioner's Cup results
- Record: 7–5 (58.3%)
- Place: 6th seed
- Playoff finish: QF (lost to Alaska)

All-Filipino Cup results
- Record: 1–8 (11.1%)
- Place: N/A
- Playoff finish: N/A

FedEx Express seasons

The 2002 FedEx Express season was the 1st season of the franchise in the Philippine Basketball Association (PBA).

== Draft picks ==
Round	Pick	Player	Nationality	College
1	1	Yancy De Ocampo	Philippines	Saint Francis
1	8	Renren Ritaulo	Philippines	La Salle Manila
4	27	John Victorio	Philippines	UNLV
5	24	Jerome Barbosa	Philippines	San Sebastian Recoletos
5	37	Edrick Ferrer	Philippines	UP Diliman
6	39	Francis Aquino	Philippines	
7	4	Paolo Malonzo	Philippines	New Era

== New team ==
FEDEX-Airfreight 2100 buy out the Tanduay Rhum franchise before the 2002 PBA season started. Team Owner Bert Lina, emphasizing that his company is the biggest courier company in the world, aims to make a big splash in its initial season. The newest ballclub absorbed four players from the defunct Tanduay and went for the biggest catch by choosing 6–8 Yancy De Ocampo from the multi-titled PBL ballclub Welcoat House Paints as the number one overall pick in the 2002 PBA draft. FedEx also took in De Ocampo's Welcoat teammate Renren Ritualo at eight overall. Coach Derrick Pumaren, who was the last coach of Tanduay Rhum Masters, will handle the coaching job for FedEx.

== Occurrences ==
Former Tanduay forward Bong Hawkins was among those absorbed by FedEx during the off-season, but a controversy sparked when Hawkins wanted to have the same terms of the salary he had with Tanduay while the FedEx management wanted to negotiate a new contract. Hawkins was later shipped to his former team Alaska. The management pay him about Php 4.2 Million, even Hawkins was not playing for the FedEx in 2003.

== Roster ==
2002 FedEx Express roster
Players

Pos.	#	POB	Name	Height	Weight	DOB (YYYY–MM–DD)	From
G	3	(Philippines)	Egay Billones	5 ft 9 in (1.75 m)			Centro Escolar Las Piñas
C	5	(Philippines)	Gido Babilonia	6 ft 5 in (1.96 m)			UST
F	8	(Philippines)	Vergel Meneses (A)	6 ft 2 in (1.88 m)			José Rizal
G	10	(Philippines)	Dindo Pumaren	5 ft 9 in (1.75 m)			De La Salle
G	14	(Philippines)	Renren Ritualo	6 ft 0 in (1.83 m)			De La Salle
F/C	18	(Philippines)	Yancy De Ocampo	6 ft 8 in (2.03 m)			Saint Francis of Assisi
G	19	(Philippines)	Wynne Arboleda	5 ft 11 in (1.80 m)			MLQU
F	21	(United States)	David Friedhof	6 ft 3 in (1.91 m)
F	23	(Philippines)	Paul Alvarez (M)	6 ft 0 in (1.83 m)			San Sebastian
G	26	(Philippines)	Biboy Simon	6 ft 0 in (1.83 m)			Manila
F	31	(Philippines)	Ryan Bernardo	6 ft 4 in (1.93 m)			UST
F	20	(Philippines)	Danny Capobres	6 ft 3 in (1.91 m)			Lyceum
C	41	(Philippines)	Zaldy Realubit	6 ft 6 in (1.98 m)			USJ–R
F/C	44	(Philippines)	Jerry Codinera	6 ft 5 in (1.96 m)			UE
F/C		(United States)	Tim Moore (G)	6 ft 7 in (2.01 m)			Houston
F	12	(United States)	Rodrick Rhodes (G)	6 ft 5 in (1.96 m)			USC
F	2	(United States)	Jermaine Walker (G/C)	6 ft 5 in (1.96 m)			Miami (FL)
G	21	(United States)	Jeremy Robinson (C)	6 ft 2 in (1.88 m)
F/C	40	(United States)	Frantz Pierre-Louis (C)	6 ft 8 in (2.03 m)			Wagner

Coaches
Head coach
- (Philippines) Derrick Pumaren
Assistant(s)
- (Philippines) Gee Abanilla
- (Philippines) Agustin Tiongco

Legend
- (DP) Unsigned draft pick
- (FA) Free agent
- (S) Suspended
- (G) Governor's Cup import
- (C) Commissioner's Cup import
- (A) Acquired
  (M) Moved to TNT
- Injured

== Eliminations (Won games) ==
Date	Opponent	Score	Venue (Location)
February 23	Shell	70–64	Cuneta Astrodome
March 1	Sta.Lucia	93–83	Caruncho Gym (Pasig)
March 10	Alaska	83–69	Ynares Center
March 23	Brgy.Ginebra	79–78	Ynares Center
April 5	Purefoods	89–75	Ynares Center
April 11	RP-Hapee	75–71	Makati Coliseum
June 29	Shell	93–84	Cuneta Astrodome
July 13	RP-Selecta	94–87	Cuneta Astrodome
July 25	Purefoods	85–76	Caruncho Gym (Pasig)
August 2	Sta.Lucia	92–90	Philsports Arena
August 6	Red Bull	92–90	Philsports Arena
August 10	Brgy.Ginebra	107–91	Philsports Arena
November 23	Sta.Lucia	90–83	Cuneta Astrodome

Governor's Cup
Commissioner's Cup
All-Filipino Cup

== Transactions ==
=== Trades ===
July 2002	To FedEx Express Vergel Meneses	To Barangay Ginebra Kings Future draft picks

=== Additions ===
Player	Signed	Former team
Paul Alvarez	Off-season	MBA
Gido Babilonia	Off-season	Talk 'N Text Phone Pals
Ryan Bernardo	Off-season	Free agent (Drafted by Mobiline/TNT in 2001)
Egay Billones	Off-season	Free agent (Drafted by Ginebra in 2000)
Danny Capobres	Off-season	(Pick by Talk 'N Text in the rookie draft)
Jerry Codiñera	Off-season	Talk 'N Text Phone Pals
Biboy Simon	Off-season	MBA

== Subtractions ==
Player	Signed	New team
Paul Alvarez	Mid-season	Talk 'N Text Phone Pals
