= 2002 PBA Commissioner's Cup =

Second conference of the 2002 PBA season

- Duration: June 16 – September 20, 2002
- TV partner(s): Viva TV on IBC

Finals
- Champions: Batang Red Bull Thunder
- Runners-up: Talk 'N Text Phone Pals

Awards
- Best Player: Davonn Harp (Batang Red Bull Thunder)
- Best Import: Jerald Honeycutt (Talk 'N Text Phone Pals)
- Finals MVP: Willie Miller (Batang Red Bull Thunder)

PBA Commissioner's Cup chronology
- < 2001 2011 >

PBA conference chronology
- < 2002 Governors' 2002 All-Filipino >

The 2002 Philippine Basketball Association (PBA) Samsung–PBA Commissioner's Cup was the second conference of the 2002 PBA season. It started on June 16 and ended on September 20, 2002. The tournament requires two imports per each team.

== Format ==
The following format will be observed for the duration of the conference:

- One-round robin eliminations; 10 games per team; Teams are then seeded by basis on win–loss records.
- The top eight teams after the eliminations will advance to the quarterfinals.
- Quarterfinals:
  - Top four teams will have a twice-to-beat advantage against their opponent.
  - QF1: #1 vs. #8
  - QF2: #2 vs. #7
  - QF3: #3 vs. #6
  - QF4: #4 vs. #5
- Best-of-five semifinals:
  - SF1: QF1 vs. QF4
  - SF2: QF2 vs. QF3
- Third-place playoff: losers of the semifinals
- Best-of-seven finals: winners of the semifinals

== List of imports ==
Each team were allowed two imports. The first line in the table are the original reinforcements of the teams. Below the name are the replacement of the import above. Same with the third replacement that is also highlighted with a different color. GP is the number of games played.

Team	Name	GP	Name	GP
Alaska Aces	Ajani Williams	18	Chris Carawell	18
Barangay Ginebra Kings	Silas Mills	4	Ben Davis	10
Barangay Ginebra Kings	Isaac Spencer	5		
Batang Red Bull Thunder	Antonio Lang	18	Julius Nwosu	22
Batang Red Bull Thunder	Sean Lampley	4		
Coca Cola Tigers	Bryant Basemore	8	Ron Hale	12
Coca Cola Tigers	Torraye Braggs	3		
Coca Cola Tigers	Carlos Daniel	1		
FedEx Express	Jeremy Robinson	1	Jermaine Walker	12
FedEx Express	Frantz Pierre-Louis	11		
Purefoods TJ Hotdogs	Kelvin Price	5	Gabe Muoneke	6
Purefoods TJ Hotdogs	Chris Morris	5	Warren Rosegreen	4
San Miguel Beermen	Jermaine Tate	1	Damon Flint	2
San Miguel Beermen	Art Long	9	Shea Seals	15
San Miguel Beermen	Terquin Mott	7		
Shell Velocity	Cedric Webber	6	Askia Jones	2
Shell Velocity	George Banks	5	Johnny Jackson	9
Sta. Lucia Realtors	Willie Farley	3	Stephen Howard	12
Sta. Lucia Realtors	Chris Clay	9		
Talk 'N Text Phone Pals	Danny Johnson	8	Jerald Honeycutt	24
Talk 'N Text Phone Pals	Pete Mickeal	16		

== Elimination round ==
=== Team standings ===
Pos	Team	W	L	PCT	GB	Qualification
1	Batang Red Bull Thunder	7	3	.700 (Note: Head-to-head record: Red Bull 1–0 Sta. Lucia)	—	Twice-to-beat in the quarterfinals
2	Sta. Lucia Realtors	7	3	.700	—	Twice-to-beat in the quarterfinals
3	Alaska Aces	6	4	.600 (Note: Head-to-head record: Alaska 3–0, San Miguel 2–1, Coca-Cola 1–2, FedEx 0–3)	1	Twice-to-beat in the quarterfinals
4	San Miguel Beermen	6	4	.600	1	Twice-to-beat in the quarterfinals
5	Coca-Cola Tigers	6	4	.600	1	Twice-to-win in the quarterfinals
6	FedEx Express	6	4	.600	1	Twice-to-win in the quarterfinals
7	Talk 'N Text Phone Pals	5	5	.500	2	Twice-to-win in the quarterfinals
8	Shell Velocity	4	6	.400	3	Twice-to-win in the quarterfinals
9	RP-Selecta Ice Cream (G)	3	7	.300 (Note: Head-to-head record: Selecta 1–0 Purefoods)	4	
10	Purefoods TJ Hotdogs	3	7	.300	4	
11	Barangay Ginebra Kings	2	8	.200	5	

Source: PBA.ph
(G) Guests

== Bracket ==
Quarterfinals (Top 4 twice-to-beat)
1	Red Bull	73
8	Shell	54
4	San Miguel	80	90*
5	Coca-Cola	84	84
2	Sta. Lucia	79	70
7	Talk 'N Text	87	80
3	Alaska	76	82
6	FedEx	79	67

Semifinals (Best-of-5)
1	Red Bull	3
4	San Miguel	1
7	Talk 'N Text	3
3	Alaska	2

Finals (Best-of-7)
1	Red Bull	4
7	Talk 'N Text	3
Third-place playoff
4	San Miguel	88
3	Alaska	85

*Overtime

== Quarterfinals ==
In each match-up, the lower-seeded team has to win twice, while the higher-seeded team only once, to progress.

=== (1) Red Bull vs. (8) Shell ===
Viva TV

August 13

recap

Batang Red Bull Thunder 73, Shell Turbo Chargers 54
Red Bull wins series in one game

Cuneta Astrodome, Pasay

=== (2) Sta. Lucia vs. (7) Talk 'N Text ===
Viva TV

August 17

recap

Sta. Lucia Realtors 79, Talk 'N Text Phone Pals 87

Ynares Center, Antipolo

Viva TV

August 18

Sta. Lucia Realtors 70, Talk 'N Text Phone Pals 80
Talk 'N Text wins series in two games

Araneta Coliseum, Quezon City

=== (3) Alaska vs. (6) FedEx ===
Viva TV

August 17

Alaska Aces 76, FedEx Express 79

Ynares Center, Antipolo

Viva TV

August 21

recap

Alaska Aces 82, FedEx Express 67
Alaska wins series in two games

Philsports Arena, Pasig

=== (4) San Miguel vs. (5) Coca-Cola ===
Viva TV

August 15

recap

San Miguel Beermen 80, Coca-Cola Tigers 84

Philsports Arena, Pasig

Viva TV

August 18

recap

San Miguel Beermen 90, Coca-Cola Tigers 84 (OT)
San Miguel wins series in two games

Araneta Coliseum, Quezon City

== Semifinals ==
=== (1) Red Bull vs. (4) San Miguel ===
Viva TV

August 23

Batang Red Bull Thunder 72, San Miguel Beermen 68

Ynares Center, Antipolo

Viva TV

August 25

recap

Batang Red Bull Thunder 83, San Miguel Beermen 80

Araneta Coliseum, Quezon City

Viva TV

August 28

Batang Red Bull Thunder 68, San Miguel Beermen 102

Philsports Arena, Pasig

Viva TV

August 30

recap

Batang Red Bull Thunder 85, San Miguel Beermen 80
Red Bull wins series, 3–1

Cuneta Astrodome, Pasay

=== (3) Alaska vs. (7) Talk 'N Text ===
Viva TV

August 23

recap

Alaska Aces 78, Talk 'N Text Phone Pals 82

Ynares Center, Antipolo

Viva TV

August 25

Alaska Aces 79, Talk 'N Text Phone Pals 87

Araneta Coliseum, Quezon City

Viva TV

August 28

recap

Alaska Aces 84, Talk 'N Text Phone Pals 81

Philsports Arena, Pasig

Viva TV

August 30

Alaska Aces 82, Talk 'N Text Phone Pals 76

Cuneta Astrodome, Pasay

Viva TV

September 1

recap

Alaska Aces 73, Talk 'N Text Phone Pals 89
Talk 'N Text wins series, 3–2

Araneta Coliseum, Quezon City

== Third place playoff ==
Viva TV

September 6

Alaska Aces 85, San Miguel Beermen 88

Cuneta Astrodome, Pasay

== Finals ==
Viva TV

September 6

Batang Red Bull Thunder 100, Talk 'N Text Phone Pals 102

Cuneta Astrodome, Pasay

Viva TV

September 8

Batang Red Bull Thunder 96, Talk 'N Text Phone Pals 86

Araneta Coliseum, Quezon City

Viva TV

September 11

Batang Red Bull Thunder 71, Talk 'N Text Phone Pals 80

Araneta Coliseum, Quezon City

Viva TV

September 13

Batang Red Bull Thunder 89, Talk 'N Text Phone Pals 81

Cuneta Astrodome, Pasay

Viva TV

September 15

Batang Red Bull Thunder 55, Talk 'N Text Phone Pals 77

Araneta Coliseum, Quezon City

Viva TV

September 18

Batang Red Bull Thunder 86, Talk 'N Text Phone Pals 78

Philsports Arena, Pasig

Viva TV

September 20

Batang Red Bull Thunder 67, Talk 'N Text Phone Pals 60
Red Bull wins series, 4–3

Araneta Coliseum, Quezon City
