= Paul Woolpert =

American basketball coach and scout

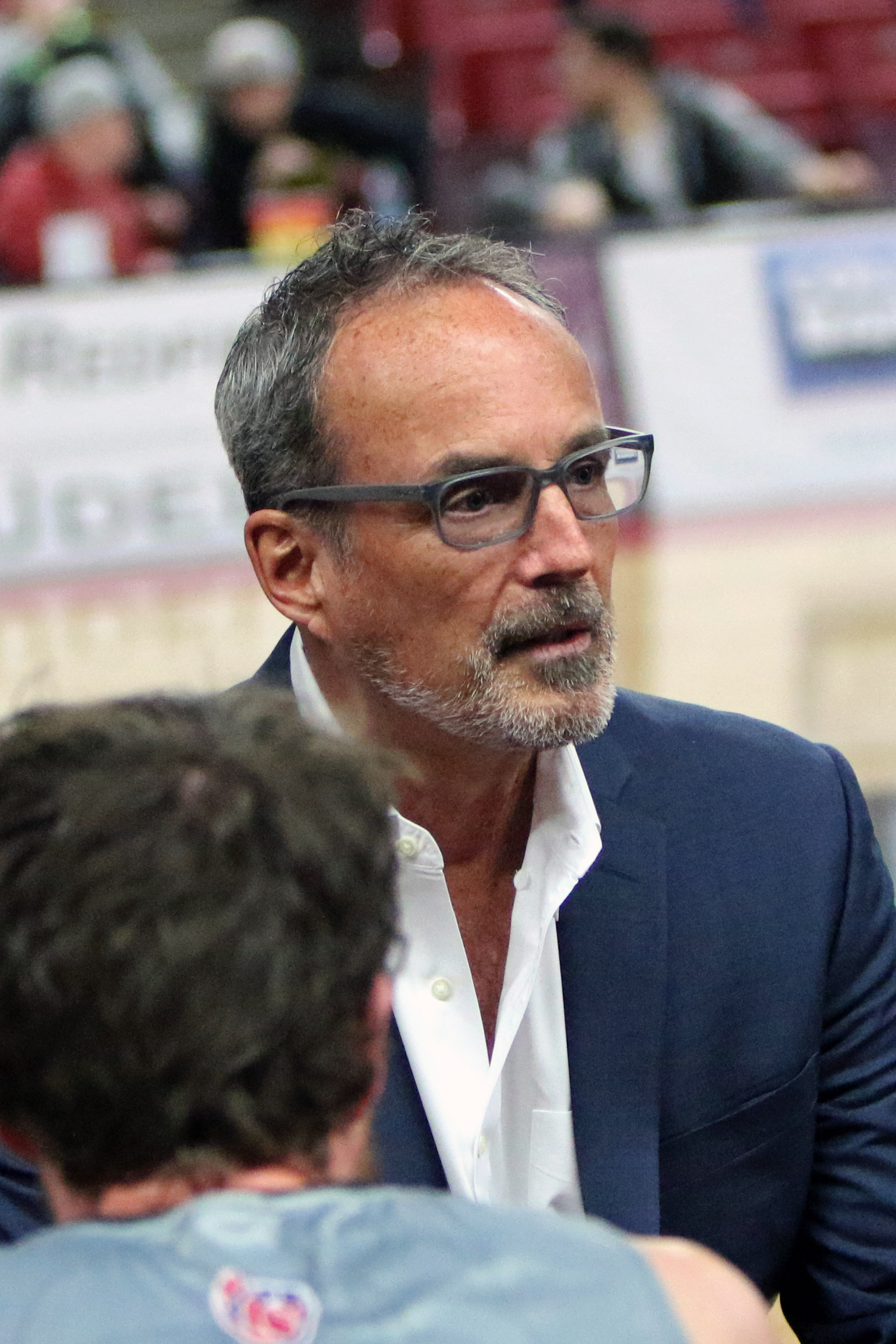
- Woolpert in April 2019

Career information
- College: Peninsula College; University of Portland
- Coaching career: 1994–present

Career history

Coaching
- 1994–1995: Yakima Sun Kings (assistant)
- 1995–1996: Sioux Falls Skyforce (assistant)
- 1996–1998: Yakima Sun Kings (assistant)
- 1998–2001: Yakima Sun Kings
- 2001–2002: Sioux Falls Skyforce
- 2002–2003: Talk 'N Text Phone Pals
- 2004–2008: Yakima Sun Kings
- 2008–2009: Tulsa 66ers
- 2011–2013: Townsville Crocodiles
- 2014–2015: Perth Wildcats (assistant)
- 2015–2017: Los Angeles D-Fenders (assistant)
- 2018–2019: Yakima SunKings
- 2019: Perth Wildcats (assistant)

Career highlights
- As head coach: NAPB champion (2018); 3× CBA champion (2000, 2006, 2007); 2× CBA Coach of the Year (2007, 2008); As assistant coach: 2× CBA champion (1995, 1996)

Paul Woolpert is an American basketball coach and scout. He was the head coach of the Yakima Sun Kings in the Continental Basketball Association (CBA) for seven non-consecutive years (1998–2001, 2004–2008). He was named CBA Coach of the Year in 2007 and 2008. He led the Sun Kings to three CBA Championships (2000, 2006, 2007). A new Yakima Sun Kings team was founded in 2017 and Woolpert was hired as head coach. The team won the North American Premier Basketball (NAPB) Championship in 2018. He was fired during the 2019 NAPB Championship Series.

Woolpert was also head coach of the Sioux Falls Skyforce of the CBA (2001–02), the Talk 'N Text Phone Pals of the Philippine Basketball Association (2003), the Tulsa 66ers of the NBA D-League (2008–09) and the Townsville Crocodiles of the National Basketball League (2011–13).

== Coaching career ==
Woolpert went to Peninsula College in Port Angeles, Washington and later transferred to the University of Portland, where he was a student assistant coach for the men's basketball team.

Woolpert got his start as a scout and video coordinator for the Seattle SuperSonics in 1986, remaining in the role until 1994. From 1995 to 2004, Woolpert served as a scout for the Portland Trail Blazers. Woolpert also coached in other capacities while maintaining those responsibilities, spending time as an assistant coach with the Sioux Falls Skyforce and the Yakima Sun Kings. Woolpert was promoted to head coach of the Sun Kings prior to the 1998 season, winning his first CBA Championship in 2000. Yakima enjoyed continued success with Woolpert at the helm, winning the CBA Championship in 2006 and 2007, while setting a CBA record for winning percentage, finishing the 2007–08 season with a 43–5 record (.895).

After serving as head coach of the Tulsa 66ers in 2008–09, Woolpert moved to Australia where he spent two seasons as the head coach of the Townsville Crocodiles.

In 2014–15, Woolpert served as the Perth Wildcats' lead assistant coach.

In August 2015, Woolpert was named an assistant coach for the Los Angeles D-fenders of the NBA Development League.

In October 2017, Woolpert rejoined the rebooted Yakima SunKings as its head coach and general manager ahead of the 2018 NAPB season. The SunKings went on to win NAPB championship in 2018. In 2019, Woolpert led the SunKings to the championships series, where he was released mid series by the owner following a Facebook post made by Woolpert asking for funds to bring his entire roster to the final championship game.

In July 2019, Woolpert was reappointed as lead assistant of the Perth Wildcats. However, he parted ways with the Wildcats on October 23, 2019, to return to the United States for family reasons.

== Coaching record ==
=== PBA record ===
Season	Team	Conference	Elims./Clas. round					Playoffs				
Season	Team	Conference	GP	W	L	PCT	Finish	PG	W	L	PCT	Results
2002	TNT	All-Filipino Cup	9	5	4	.556	4th	1	0	1	.000	Lost to Alaska in one-game quarterfinals
2003	TNT	All-Filipino	9	4	5	.444	-	Fired				
Career Total			18	9	9	.500	Playoff Total	1	0	1	.000	0 championship

=== NBA Developmental League ===
Team	Year	G	W	L	W–L%	Finish	PG	PW	PL	PW–L%	Result
Tulsa	2008–09	50	15	35	.300	5th in Southwest	—	—	—	—	Missed playoffs
Career		50	15	30	.333		—	—	—	—	
