= Donbel Belano =

Filipino basketball player and coach

Personal information
- Born: December 24, 1976 (age 49) Tagum, Davao del Norte, Philippines
- Listed height: 5 ft 10 in (1.78 m)
- Listed weight: 178 lb (81 kg)

Career information
- College: UV
- PBA draft: 1999: 1st round14th
- Drafted by: Pop Cola Panthers
- Playing career: 1999–2010
- Position: Point guard
- Number: 42
- Coaching career: 2011–present

Career history

Playing
- 1999–2000: Davao Eagles
- 2001–2002: Sta. Lucia Realtors
- 2002–2009: Talk 'N Text Phone Pals
- 2009–2010: Barako Bull Energy Boosters
- 2010: Sta. Lucia Realtors

Coaching
- 2011–2014: UV Green Lancers
- 2025: CIT-U Wildcats

Career highlights
- As player: 2× PBA champion (2001 Governors', 2003 All-Filipino); As head coach: CESAFI champion (2013)

Felix "Donbel" Belano (born December 24, 1976) is a Filipino former professional basketball player and coach.

Belano played college basketball for the UV Green Lancers. He started his professional career with the Davao Eagles of the Metropolitan Basketball Association (MBA). In the 1999 season, he tallied a quadruple-double and was named Rookie of the Year. He then played in the Philippine Basketball Association (PBA), notably with Talk 'N Text where he played for seven seasons (2002 to 2008–09) and won two championships: the 2001 Governors' Cup and 2003 All-Filipino Cup. The other PBA teams he played for were the Sta. Lucia Realtors and Barako Bull.

After retiring from playing, Belano went into coaching, including a stint with his alma mater, the UV Green Lancers, for three years. He led them to the Cebu Schools Athletic Foundation, Inc. (CESAFI) title in 2013.

He is the first player in Philippine professional basketball to achieve a quadruple-double in a game and was the only player to do so before Kyt Jimenez in 2022.

== Playing career ==
Belano started his professional basketball career with the Davao Eagles in the Metropolitan Basketball Association.

On August 14, 1999, he earned the distinction as the first player to record a quadruple-double in the annals of Philippine basketball during a game against Willie Miller-led Nueva Ecija Patriots, when he tallied 17 points, 11 rebounds, 11 assists and 10 steals. With this feat, he changed his jersey number from 9 to 42. He was named the rookie of the year in the 1999 season. It would be the only such quadruple-double until Kyt Jimenez of the Sarangani Marlins did it in the Maharlika Pilipinas Basketball League during the 2022 season.

He was drafted 14th overall by Pop Cola in the 1999 PBA Draft but did not play a single game with the franchise. In 2001, he signed with Sta. Lucia Realtors as a free agent. In May 2002, he was traded to Talk 'N Text for Gherome Ejercito.

His stint with the Talk 'N Text would be the most remarkable in his career. During Game 7 of the 2007 PBA Fiesta Conference finals against the Alaska Aces, he had a shot that would have taken the lead and possibly bring home the trophy for the Phone Pals. At the end of the season 2009, he was left unsigned. Before the start of the 2010 season, he was signed by the Barako Bull Energy Boosters. Then, before the Fiesta Conference, he was acquired by the Sta. Lucia Realtors and played with the team until it disbanded.

After Sta. Lucia's disbandment and eventual sale to Meralco, with no team to sign up with, he decided to retire.

== Coaching career ==
Belano served as the head coach of his alma mater, the University of the Visayas Green Lancers in the CESAFI. He helped the Green Lancers win the title against the SWU Cobras in 2013 after being down 0–2 of their best-of-five series. After losing to the USC Warriors during the final four, he was fired at the end of the 2014 CESAFI season.

Belano has pioneered the Outstanding Basketball Enhancement for the Youth, otherwise known as OBEY, which offers PBA-based basketball training to private institutions in Cebu, trailblazing basketball sport as a career path of choice for the new generation of K-12 learners.

== PBA career statistics ==
Legend
GP	Games played	MPG	Minutes per game
FG%	Field-goal percentage	3P%	3-point field-goal percentage	FT%	Free-throw percentage
RPG	Rebounds per game	APG	Assists per game	SPG	Steals per game
BPG	Blocks per game	PPG	Points per game	**Bold**	Career high

=== Season-by-season averages ===
Year	Team	GP	MPG	FG%	3P%	FT%	RPG	APG	SPG	BPG	PPG
2001	Sta. Lucia	48	21.1	.352	.314	**.755**	2.7	2.1	.9	.0	**6.7**
2002	Sta. Lucia	37	13.4	.343	.233	.667	1.4	1.3	.3	.0	3.5
2002	Talk 'N Text	37	13.4	.343	.233	.667	1.4	1.3	.3	.0	3.5
2003	Talk 'N Text	53	14.0	.347	.291	.708	1.6	2.1	.7	.0	4.3
2004–05	Talk 'N Text	**79**	16.0	.391	.259	.673	1.7	2.0	.7	**.1**	5.1
2005–06	Talk 'N Text	28	18.8	**.412**	**.370**	.674	2.1	2.0	.8	**.1**	7.5
2006–07	Talk 'N Text	62	**24.3**	.375	.311	.547	**3.0**	**3.3**	**1.1**	.0	6.7
2007–08	Talk 'N Text	33	16.2	.409	.306	.625	1.9	2.2	.7	**.1**	4.7
2009–10	Barako Bull	28	17.4	.381	.306	.533	1.8	2.1	.5	.1	4.3
2009–10	Sta. Lucia	28	17.4	.381	.306	.533	1.8	2.1	.5	.1	4.3
Career		368	17.9	.375	.300	.650	2.1	2.2	.7	**.1**	5.4

== Personal life ==
He is married to Liza May Viajante, a pediatrician, with whom he has four children, Patrick Yuan Emmanuel, Andrei Siegdon Nathanael, Damian Felix Zuriel, and Marquita Dawn Felicia. They now reside in Cebu City.

Preceded by Boy Cabahug	UV Green Lancers men's basketball head coach 2011-2014	Succeeded by Gary Cortes
