= 2002 Sta. Lucia Realtors season =

- Head coach: Norman Black
- Owner: Sta. Lucia Realty and Development Corporation

Governor's Cup results
- Record: 5–6 (45.5%)
- Place: N/A
- Playoff finish: N/A

Commissioner's Cup results
- Record: 7–5 (58.3%)
- Place: 2nd seed
- Playoff finish: QF (lost to TNT)

All-Filipino Cup results
- Record: 4–6 (40%)
- Place: 6th seed
- Playoff finish: QF (lost to Coca Cola)

Sta. Lucia Realtors seasons

The 2002 Sta. Lucia Realtors season was the 10th season of the franchise in the Philippine Basketball Association (PBA).

== Transactions ==
Players Added

Via Draft

- Omanzie Rodriguez
- Chito Victolero

Via Trade

- Gherome Ejercito (From Talk 'N Text Phone Pals in May 2002)
Players Lost

Via Free Agency

- Jercules Tangkay (To Talk 'N Text Phone Pals)

Via Trade

- Donbel Belano (To Talk 'N Text Phone Pals in May 2002)

== Occurrences ==
The Realtors had two of its players chosen in the Philippine national team training pool divided into two groups during the Governor's Cup, Dennis Espino for RP-Selecta Ice Cream and Marlou Aquino for RP-Hapee Toothpaste.

In the Commissioner's Cup, the Realtors signed Chris Clay, a Fil-American who was with the RP training pool and formerly of Pangasinan Waves from the Metropolitan Basketball Association (MBA) to replace one of their imports, Willie Farley.

== Roster ==
2002 Sta. Lucia Realtors roster
Players

Pos.	#	POB	Name	Height	Weight	DOB (YYYY–MM–DD)	From
F/C	6	(Philippines)	Omanzie Rodriguez	6 ft 6 in (1.98 m)			Mapúa
C	7	(Philippines)	Richard del Rosario	6 ft 5 in (1.96 m)			De La Salle
G	8	(Philippines)	Paolo Mendoza	5 ft 11 in (1.80 m)			Philippines
F	9	(Philippines)	Gerard Francisco	6 ft 3 in (1.91 m)			UST
G	10	(Philippines)	Chris Tan	6 ft 1 in (1.85 m)			De La Salle
G	11	(Philippines)	Francis Adriano	6 ft 0 in (1.83 m)			Far Eastern
C	13	(Philippines)	Marlou Aquino	6 ft 9 in (2.06 m)			Adamson
G	14	(Philippines)	Gherome Ejercito (Acquired)	6 ft 2 in (1.88 m)			Adamson
F	15	(Philippines)	Expedito Falcasantos	6 ft 4 in (1.93 m)			Cebu
F/C	16	(Philippines)	Dennis Espino	6 ft 6 in (1.98 m)			UST
C	29	(Philippines)	Marvin Ortiguerra	6 ft 4 in (1.93 m)			UST
C	38	(Philippines)	Angelo David	6 ft 6 in (1.98 m)			Far Eastern
F	53	(Philippines)	Michael Orquillas	6 ft 2 in (1.88 m)			Cebu
G	62	(Philippines)	Chito Victolero	5 ft 11 in (1.80 m)			Mapúa
F	25	(United States)	Victor Thomas (G)	6 ft 7 in (2.01 m)			La Salle
G/F	3	(United States)	Lelan McDougal (G)	6 ft 3 in (1.91 m)			UC Santa Barbara
F	4	(United States)	Davis, Mark (G)	6 ft 7 in (2.01 m)			Texas Tech
F/C	21	(United States)	Johnny Taylor (G)	6 ft 8 in (2.03 m)			Chattanooga
G/F	2	(United States)	Willie Farley (C)	6 ft 5 in (1.96 m)			Fresno State
F	20	(United States)	Chris Clay (C)	6 ft 8 in (2.03 m)
G/F	21	(United States)	Howard, Stephen (C)	6 ft 7 in (2.01 m)			DePaul
G	42	(Philippines)	Donbel Belano (T)	5 ft 8 in (1.73 m)			Visayas

Coaches
Head coach
- (United States) Norman Black
Assistant(s)
- (Philippines) Adonis Tierra
- (Philippines) Franz Pumaren
- (Philippines) Alfrancis Chua

Legend
- (DP) Unsigned draft pick
- (FA) Free agent
- (S) Suspended
- (G) Governor's Cup import
- (C) Commissioner's Cup import
- (T) Traded
- Injured

== Eliminations (Won games) ==
Date	Opponent	Score	Venue (Location)
February 23	Brgy.Ginebra	75–72	Cuneta Astrodome
March 12	RP-Selecta	61–55	Philsports Arena
March 24	Coca-Cola	87–86	Araneta Coliseum
April 2	Alaska	80–71	Philsports Arena
April 7	San Miguel	73–65	Araneta Coliseum
June 21	Purefoods	90–75	Ynares Center
July 7	RP-Selecta	66–62	Araneta Coliseum
July 12	Brgy.Ginebra	89–76	(Dumaguete City)
July 23	Alaska	74–61	Philsports Arena
July 27	Coca-Cola	69–63	Ynares Center
August 4	Shell	73–66	Araneta Coliseum
August 11	San Miguel	74–65	Araneta Coliseum
October 25	Talk 'N Text	70–67	Cuneta Astrodome
November 10	Shell	65–57	Araneta Coliseum
November 27	Purefoods	68–64	Philsports Arena
December 4	San Miguel	68–65	Philsports Arena

Governor's Cup
Commissioner's Cup
All-Filipino Cup
