= 2002 Coca-Cola Tigers season =

- Head coach: Chot Reyes
- General manager: Hector Calma
- Owner: Coca-Cola Bottlers Philippines, Inc.

Governors' Cup results
- Record: 12–6 (66.7%)
- Place: 2nd seed
- Playoff finish: Semifinals

Commissioner's Cup results
- Record: 7–5 (58.3%)
- Place: 5th seed
- Playoff finish: QF (lost to SMB)

All-Filipino Cup results
- Record: 12–5 (70.6%)
- Place: 3rd seed
- Playoff finish: Champions

Coca-Cola Tigers seasons

The 2002 Coca-Cola Tigers season was the 1st season of the franchise in the Philippine Basketball Association (PBA).

== New team ==
Formerly the Pop Cola Panthers, RFM Corporation sold its entire stake in softdrink unit Cosmos Bottling Corporation and its PBA franchise to Coca-Cola Bottlers Philippines, Inc. The team was renamed Coca-Cola Tigers as a new ballclub. Records of the Pop Cola Panthers were not retained.

== Transactions ==
Players Added

Via Draft

- All five players drafted

Via Free Agency

- Freddie Abuda (From San Miguel Beermen; originally traded to Tanduay)
- Lowell Briones (From Batang Red Bull Thunder)
- Jeffrey Cariaso (From Tanduay Rhum Masters)
- Jovie Sese (Pick by Pop Cola last year)
- Absorbed 8 players from Pop Cola

== Occurrences ==
Key players Rudy Hatfield and Jeffrey Cariaso serve time for the national team in the first two conferences. Three other Tigers, rookie Rafi Reavis and center Poch Juinio played for RP-Selecta while Johnny Abarrientos played for RP-Hapee during the Governor's Cup.

== Championship ==
The Coca Cola Tigers made history by becoming the first team to win a PBA title in its maiden season as they captured the season-ending All-Filipino Cup crown over the Alaska Aces, three games to one. The Tigers won their first championship on a historic night on Christmas Day with a 78-63 victory in Game four of the finals.

== Roster ==
2002 Coca-Cola Tigers roster
Players

Pos.	#	POB	Name	Height	Weight	DOB (YYYY–MM–DD)	From
G/F	3	(Philippines)	Jojo Manalo	6 ft 2 in (1.88 m)			UPHSD
C	4	(United States)	Rafi Reavis	6 ft 8 in (2.03 m)			Coppin State
F	8	(Philippines)	Lowell Briones	6 ft 3 in (1.91 m)			Visayas
C	9	(Philippines)	Gilbert Lao	6 ft 8 in (2.03 m)			UST
G	10	(Philippines)	Renato Morano	6 ft 0 in (1.83 m)			San Beda
F	12	(Philippines)	Allan Gamboa	6 ft 5 in (1.96 m)			Philippines
G	14	(Philippines)	Johnny Abarrientos	5 ft 8 in (1.73 m)			Far Eastern
F	15	(Philippines)	Jason Misolas	6 ft 3 in (1.91 m)			Letran
F	16	(Philippines)	Estong Ballesteros	6 ft 3 in (1.91 m)			UST
G	18	(Philippines)	Leo Avenido	6 ft 2 in (1.88 m)			Far Eastern
G	22	(United States)	Jeffrey Cariaso	6 ft 2 in (1.88 m)			Sonoma State
C	24	(Philippines)	Cris Bolado	6 ft 7 in (2.01 m)			National-U
F	25	(Philippines)	Freddie Abuda	6 ft 4 in (1.93 m)			Cebu
C		(Philippines)	Jovie Sese	6 ft 6 in (1.98 m)			MLQU
G	31	(United States)	William Antonio	6 ft 3 in (1.91 m)			Chaminade
C	32	(Philippines)	Poch Juinio	6 ft 5 in (1.96 m)			Philippines
F	99	(United States)	Rudy Hatfield	6 ft 3 in (1.91 m)			UM–Dearborn
G	26	(United States)	Rosell Ellis (G)	6 ft 3 in (1.91 m)			McNeese State
F	22	(United States)	Fred Williams (G)	6 ft 8 in (2.03 m)			UAB
F	22	(United States)	Ron Hale (G/C)	6 ft 7 in (2.01 m)			Florida State
F/C		(United States)	Bryant Basemore (C)	6 ft 8 in (2.03 m)			Fort Hays State
F	21	(United States)	Torraye Braggs (C)	6 ft 7 in (2.01 m)			Xavier
F	21	(United States)	Carlos Daniel (C)	6 ft 6 in (1.98 m)			Washington State

Coaches
Head coach
- (Philippines) Chot Reyes
Assistant(s)
- (Philippines) Biboy Ravanes
- (Philippines) Binky Favis
- (Philippines) Aboy Castro
- (Philippines) Mike Reyes

Legend
- (DP) Unsigned draft pick
- (FA) Free agent
- (S) Suspended
- (G) Governor's Cup Import
- (C) Commissioner's Cup Import
- Injured

== Eliminations (Won games) ==
Date	Opponent	Score	Venue (Location)
February 10	FedEx	66-62	Araneta Coliseum
February 22	San Miguel	85-79	Ynares Center
March 3	Purefoods	89-69	Philsports Arena
March 9	Brgy.Ginebra	82-74	Cuneta Astrodome
March 16	Alaska	79-53	Cuneta Astrodome
April 4	Red Bull	96-77	Makati Coliseum
April 7	RP-Selecta	70-66	Araneta Coliseum
April 14	Talk 'N Text	95-90	Araneta Coliseum
June 18	FedEx	110-82	Cuneta Astrodome
June 22	Shell	78-70	Cuneta Astrodome
July 4	Brgy.Ginebra	70-65	Cuneta Astrodome
July 9	Purefoods	91-72	Cuneta Astrodome
July 19	Talk 'N Text	94-91	Cuneta Astrodome
August 8	RP-Selecta	74-62	Cuneta Astrodome
October 27	Shell	80-52	Araneta Coliseum
November 3	Purefoods	83-58	Araneta Coliseum
November 8	Brgy.Ginebra	85-63	Cuneta Astrodome
November 13	FedEx	75-69	Philsports Arena
November 20	Sta.Lucia	67-53	Cuneta Astrodome
November 29	Talk 'N Text	92-84	Cuneta Astrodome

Governor's Cup
Commissioner's Cup
All-Filipino Cup
