= 2002 Barangay Ginebra Kings season =

- Head coach: Cris Calilan; Allan Caidic (All-Filipino Cup)
- General Manager: Ira Maniquis
- Owner(s): Danding Cojuangco

Governor's Cup results
- Record: 3–8 (27.3%)
- Place: N/A
- Playoff finish: N/A

Commissioner's Cup results
- Record: 2–8 (20%)
- Place: N/A
- Playoff finish: N/A

All-Filipino Cup results
- Record: 3–7 (30%)
- Place: N/A
- Playoff finish: N/A

Barangay Ginebra Kings seasons

The 2002 Barangay Ginebra Kings season was the 24th season of the franchise in the Philippine Basketball Association (PBA).

== Occurrences ==
Eric Menk was one of the 15 players chosen by national coach Jong Uichico to play for the Philippine men's basketball team in the 2002 Asian Games in Busan, South Korea. Ginebra head coach Allan Caidic was named among the national team's assistant coaches and taking over from the Ginebra bench to call the shots is assistant coach Cris Calilan.

== Transactions ==
Players Added

Via Draft

- Gilbert Malabanan
- Chester Tolomia

Via Trade

- Eric Menk (From Tanduay in exchange for 2 players and 2 future draft picks)
- James Walkvist (From Alaska Aces in June 2002)
Players Lost

Via Trade

- Alex Crisano (To Talk 'N Text; part of the Menk deal which originally shipped him to Tanduay)
- Vergel Meneses (To FedEx Express in July 2002 in exchange for future draft picks, thus Ginebra regain the 2003 first round pick it traded to Tanduay for Eric Menk – in which FedEx inherited when it bought the franchise.)
- EJ Feihl (To Alaska Aces in June 2002)

== Roster ==
2002 Barangay Ginebra Kings roster
Players

Pos.	#	POB	Name	Height	Weight	DOB (YYYY–MM–DD)	From
G	1	(Philippines)	Bal David	5 ft 9 in (1.75 m)			UST
G/F	3	(Philippines)	Elmer Lago (RA)	6 ft 2 in (1.88 m)			De La Salle
F/C	9	(Philippines)	Jun Limpot	6 ft 5 in (1.96 m)			De La Salle
G	13	(Philippines)	Jayjay Helterbrand	6 ft 0 in (1.83 m)			Kentucky State
C	14	(Philippines)	Aramis Calpito	6 ft 5 in (1.96 m)			San Sebastian
G	15	(Philippines)	Edward Naron	6 ft 1 in (1.85 m)			Visayas
F	17	(Philippines)	Chester Tolomia	6 ft 2 in (1.88 m)			UPHSD
C	18	(Philippines)	Wilmer Ong	6 ft 4 in (1.93 m)			USLS
F	19	(Philippines)	Gilbert Malabanan	6 ft 4 in (1.93 m)			UPHSD
C	22	(United States)	James Walkvist (A)	6 ft 10 in (2.08 m)
C	30	(Philippines)	Eric Menk	6 ft 6 in (1.98 m)			Lake Superior State
C	31	(Philippines)	Marlon Basco	6 ft 5 in (1.96 m)
F	33	(Philippines)	Teodoro Valera	6 ft 2 in (1.88 m)			UST
F	35	(Philippines)	Marlon Piodo	6 ft 5 in (1.96 m)			USJ–R
F	44	(Philippines)	Ronald Magtulis	6 ft 3 in (1.91 m)			Far Eastern
G	47	(Philippines)	Mark Caguioa	6 ft 0 in (1.83 m)			Glendale CC (CA)
F	10	(United States)	Jarrod Gee (G)	6 ft 7 in (2.01 m)			Illinois
G/F	6	(United States)	Bubba Wells (G)	6 ft 5 in (1.96 m)			Austin Peay
F	5	(United States)	Desmond Ferguson (G)	6 ft 7 in (2.01 m)			Detroit Mercy
G	6	(United States)	Bryan Green (G)	6 ft 2 in (1.88 m)			Nevada
F/C	21	(United States)	Ben Davis (C)	6 ft 9 in (2.06 m)			Arizona
F	11	(United States)	Silas Mills (C)	6 ft 7 in (2.01 m)			Utah
G/F	5	(United States)	Isaac Spencer (C)	6 ft 6 in (1.98 m)			Murray State
F	2	(Philippines)	Vergel Meneses (T)	6 ft 2 in (1.88 m)			José Rizal
C	32	(Philippines)	Edward Joseph Feihl (T/*)	7 ft 1 in (2.16 m)			Adamson

Coaches
Head coach
- (Philippines) Allan Caidic
Assistant(s)
- (Philippines) Bong Ramos
- (Philippines) George Ella
- (Philippines) Cris Calilan

Legend
- (DP) Unsigned draft pick
- (FA) Free agent
- (S) Suspended
- (G) Governor's Cup imports
- (C) Commissioner's Cup imports
- *(A) Acquired via trade
  - (T) Traded
  - (RA) Re-Acquired from TNT
  - (*) Listed in the line-up
- Injured

== Eliminations (Won games) ==
Date	Opponent	Score	Venue (Location)
March 2	Shell	80–72	Cuneta Astrodome
April 6	RP-Hapee	75–69	Philsports Arena
April 14	Red Bull	98–90	Araneta Coliseum
June 21	RP-Selecta	85–81	Ynares Center
July 7	Talk 'N Text	74–63	Araneta Coliseum
October 26	San Miguel	68–62	(Balanga, Bataan)
October 30	Sta.Lucia	74–70	Ynares Center
November 17	FedEx	84–65	Araneta Coliseum

Governor's Cup
Commissioner's Cup
All-Filipino Cup
