= 2002 Purefoods Tender Juicy Hotdogs season =

- Head coach: Ryan Gregorio; Eric Altamirano (All-Filipino Cup)
- General manager: Rene Pardo

Governor's Cup results
- Record: 16–8 (66.7%)
- Place: 3rd seed
- Playoff finish: Champions

Commissioner's Cup results
- Record: 3–7 (30%)
- Place: N/A
- Playoff finish: N/A

All-Filipino Cup results
- Record: 4–7 (36.4%)
- Place: 8th
- Playoff finish: QF (lost to Red Bull)

Purefoods Tender Juicy Hotdogs seasons

The 2002 Purefoods Tender Juicy Hotdogs season was the 15th season of the franchise in the Philippine Basketball Association (PBA).

== Transactions ==
Players Added

Via draft

- Junel Mendiola

Via Trade

- Bonel Balingit (From defunct Tanduay Rhum Masters)
- Chris Cantonjos (From defunct Tanduay Rhum Masters)
- Kerby Raymundo (From Red Bull)
Players Lost

Via Free Agency

- Rommel Daep
- Dino Manuel

Via Trade

- EJ Feihl (To Barangay Ginebra Kings for a future draft)

== Championship ==
The Purefoods Tender Juicy Hotdogs celebrated their sixth PBA championship and the first in five years by winning the Governor's Cup title over the Alaska Aces in a seven-game series after losing the first two games. Purefoods' finals victory was the first for the team under the new company owner in San Miguel Corporation. Interim coach Ryan Gregorio won his first title as a mentor.

== Roster ==
2002 Purefoods Tender Juicy Hotdogs roster
Players

Pos.	#	POB	Name	Height	Weight	DOB (YYYY–MM–DD)	From
F	2	(Philippines)	Richard Yee	6 ft 4 in (1.93 m)			UST
C	3	(Philippines)	Bonel Balingit	6 ft 9 in (2.06 m)			Visayas
G	5	(Philippines)	Ronnie Magsanoc	5 ft 9 in (1.75 m)			Philippines
G	6	(Philippines)	Boyet Fernandez	5 ft 8 in (1.73 m)			San Agustin
F	7	(Philippines)	Rey Evangelista	6 ft 3 in (1.91 m)			UST
F	10	(Philippines)	Marc Steven Victoria	6 ft 3 in (1.91 m)			Far Eastern
G	13	(Philippines)	Roger Yap	6 ft 1 in (1.85 m)			USJ–R
G	14	(Philippines)	Junel Mendiola	6 ft 1 in (1.85 m)			PSBA
F	16	(Philippines)	Alvin Patrimonio	6 ft 3 in (1.91 m)			Mapúa
F	18	(Philippines)	Paul Guerrero	6 ft 4 in (1.93 m)			Letran
C	21	(Philippines)	Kerby Raymundo	6 ft 6 in (1.98 m)			Letran
C	33	(Philippines)	Chris Cantonjos	6 ft 6 in (1.98 m)			UST
F	34	(Philippines)	Jolly Escobar	6 ft 5 in (1.96 m)			UE
G	40	(United States)	Noy Castillo	6 ft 0 in (1.83 m)			The Citadel
C	52	(United States)	Andy Seigle	6 ft 9 in (2.06 m)			LSU New Orleans
G	32	(United States)	Derrick Brown (G)	6 ft 3 in (1.91 m)			Providence
G/F	35	(United States)	Leonard White (G)	6 ft 5 in (1.96 m)			Southern
F	9	(United States)	Kelvin Price (G/C)	6 ft 8 in (2.03 m)			Charlotte
F	35	(Niger)	Gabe Muoneke (C)	6 ft 7 in (2.01 m)			Texas
F	34	(United States)	Chris Morris (C)	6 ft 8 in (2.03 m)			Auburn
G/F	42	(United States)	Warren Rosegreen (C)	6 ft 6 in (1.98 m)			UNLV

Coaches
Head coach
- (Philippines) Eric Altamirano
Assistant(s)
- (Philippines) Ryan Gregorio
- (Philippines) Ramon Jose

Legend
- (DP) Unsigned draft pick
- (FA) Free agent
- (S) Suspended
- (G) Governor's Cup import
- (C) Commissioner's Cup import
- Injured

== Eliminations (Won games) ==
Date	Opponent	Score	Venue (Location)
February 16	Talk 'N Text	92–89	Araneta Coliseum
February 19	Brgy.Ginebra	60–58	Philsports Arena
February 24	Alaska	79–74	Philsports Arena
March 8	RP-Selecta	89–72	(Balanga, Bataan)
March 14	San Miguel	72–70	Makati Coliseum
March 19	Shell	92–87	Cuneta Astrodome
March 24	RP-Hapee	107–77	Araneta Coliseum
April 13	Sta.Lucia	87–76	Philsports Arena
June 25	Brgy.Ginebra	83–78	Cuneta Astrodome
August 3	Red Bull	91–84	Cuneta Astrodome
August 10	Shell	79–75	Philsports Arena
October 20	Brgy.Ginebra	71–63	Araneta Coliseum
October 25	FedEx	85–82	Cuneta Astrodome
November 13	Alaska	62–56	Philsports Arena

Governor's Cup
Commissioner's Cup
All-Filipino Cup
