= Willie Miller (basketball) =

Filipino basketball player (born 1977)

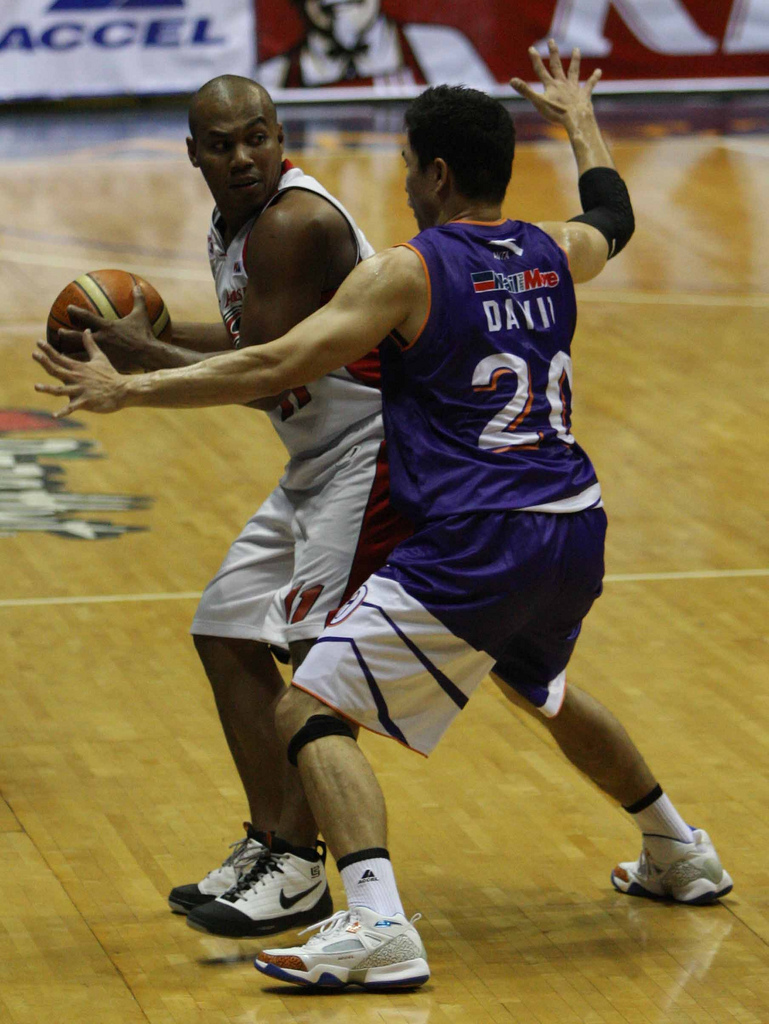
- Miller (left) with the Alaska Aces in 2008

Converge FiberXers
- Title: Assistant coach
- League: PBA

Personal information
- Born: July 13, 1977 (age 49) Olongapo, Philippines
- Listed height: 5 ft 11 in (1.80 m)
- Listed weight: 200 lb (91 kg)

Career information
- College: Letran
- PBA draft: 2001: 1st round, 1st overall pick
- Drafted by: Batang Red Bull Thunder
- Playing career: 1999–2016
- Position: Point guard / shooting guard
- Coaching career: 2023–present

Career history

Playing
- 1999–2000: Nueva Ecija Patriots
- 2001–2003: Batang Red Bull Thunder
- 2004–2006: Talk 'N Text Phone Pals
- 2006–2010: Alaska Aces
- 2010–2011: Barangay Ginebra Kings
- 2011–2012: Barako Bull Energy
- 2012–2013: GlobalPort Batang Pier
- 2013–2014: Barako Bull Energy
- 2015: Talk N' Text Tropang Texters
- 2015–2016: Pilipinas MX3 Kings

Coaching
- 2023–present: Converge FiberXers (assistant)
- 2025: Letran HS

Career highlights
- 4× PBA champion (2001 Commissioner's, 2002 Commissioner's, 2007 Fiesta, 2015 Commissioner's); 2× PBA Finals Most Valuable Player (2002 Commissioner's, 2007 Fiesta); 2× PBA Most Valuable Player (2002, 2007); 2× PBA Best Player of the Conference (2005 Fiesta, 2009 Philippine); 9× PBA All-Star Game (2001, 2003–2004, 2006–2011); 3× PBA Mythical First Team (2002, 2005, 2007); 2× PBA Mythical Second Team (2008, 2009); PBA All-Defensive Team (2003); PBA All-Star Co-Finals Most Valuable Player (2007); 2× PBA Obstacle Challenge champion (2006, 2008); PBA Trick Shot Challenge champion (2006); PBA Motolite Pangmatagalan Player of the Year (2009); PBA Sportsmanship Award (2014); 50 Greatest Players in PBA History (2015 selection); NCAA Rookie of the Year (1995)

Willie V. Miller Jr. (born July 13, 1977) is a Filipino professional basketball coach and former player who currently serves as an assistant coach for the Converge FiberXers of the Philippine Basketball Association (PBA). A versatile guard, he primarily played as a point guard but was also capable of playing the shooting guard position. Miller last played professionally for the Pilipinas MX3 Kings in the ASEAN Basketball League. He has started at the point guard position but also played the shooting guard position. Widely regarded as one of the greatest guards in PBA history, he won four PBA championships and two PBA Most Valuable Player Awards.

Miller played college basketball for Letran, where he was widely touted by the national media as a future PBA superstar. After graduating, he was selected with the first overall by the Thunder in the 2001 PBA draft. He led the franchise to two PBA championships before being traded to the Alaska Aces where he captured another title. Miller later added a fourth championship with Talk N' Text Tropang Texters.

== Collegiate career ==
Miller played collegiate basketball for the Letran Knights in the NCAA.

== Professional career ==
=== Metropolitan Basketball Association ===
In 1999, Miller began to play for the expansion Nueva Ecija Patriots of the MBA. He was ranked second in the league, scoring a 23.6 average a contest, and made it to the MBA First Five. However, the Patriots won only five games in his first season.

Nueva Ecija did not make it to the playoffs, as the team ranked among the worst teams in the league during the 2000 season.

=== Philippine Basketball Association ===
==== Red Bull (2001–2003) ====
In 2001, Miller opted out of the MBA to join the PBA Rookie Draft. Batang Red Bull Thunder, with the top overall pick in the draft, selected Miller as the first pick, despite speculations of possibly choosing Filipino-American player John Arigo.

In his first season, Miller was playing the backup role to Jimwell Torion at point guard but was able to contribute solid numbers in his PBA debut. He played in Red Bull's 2001 Commissioners Cup championship upset of the San Miguel Beermen. In Game 5, he made a last-second block on Beermen import Nate Johnson to preserve the Thunder's victory, and a 3–2 series lead.

===== 2002: MVP year =====
Fortunes change 2002, despite playing sparingly with Torion, Junthy Valenzuela and Lordy Tugade, Miller played a huge role for Red Bull. After the RP-Hapee Training Pool in which Red Bull achieved an overtime win over the Nationals, Miller's performances, alongside the play of teammate Davonn Harp, led to Red Bull's second PBA title in the 2002 Commissioners Cup.

He continued his play all the way to the All-Filipino Cup. At season's end, he was selected to the PBA Mythical Team and won the PBA Most Valuable Player Award, the only player in league history to win the award with a scoring average below 10 points a contest. Miller beat teammate Harp for the award.

Miller continued to play his usual performances in the 2003, making it to the Mythical Team for the second straight season.

==== Talk 'N Text (2004–2006) ====
In the 2004 offseason, Miller was traded by Red Bull to the Talk 'N Text Phone Pals in a one-sided deal. The transaction paved way for a strong backcourt duo between him and 2003 Rookie of the Year Jimmy Alapag while playing alongside 2003 MVP Asi Taulava and veterans Vic Pablo, Mark Telan, and rookie Harvey Carey.

During the 2004-05 PBA season, the Phone Pals played in two of the three finals appearances, with Miller playing big roles for the Phone Pals. However, losses to Barangay Ginebra and San Miguel denied Talk 'N Text a championship.

However, Miller played big games for the Phone Pals. He was instrumental in Talk 'N Text's come-from-behind win over Ginebra in Game 4 of the 2004-05 PBA Philippine Cup finals and in a losing effort scoring 32 points in Game 6.

He was named the 2005 PBA Fiesta Conference Best Player after another strong performance leading Talk 'N Text to the best record during the tournament.

At season's end, he was named to the Mythical Team joining Alapag on the spot.

==== Alaska Aces (2006–2010) ====
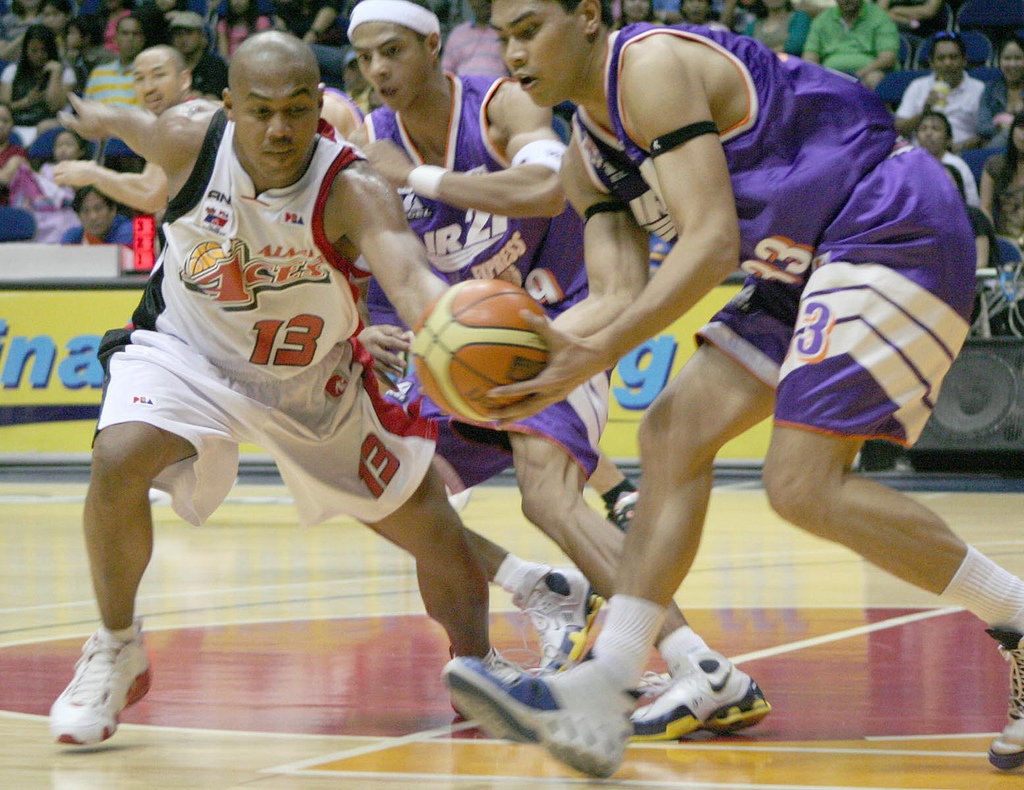
Miller contesting the ball with Air21's Ranidel de Ocampo

Willie once again played in the 2005–06 season. At the middle of the 2006 Philippine Cup, Miller was traded to the Alaska Aces as part of a trade with the Phone Pals.

This time, Miller's backcourt partner would be Mike Cortez and with them, Jeffrey Cariaso, Sonny Thoss, and Reynel Hugnatan, the Aces took third-place honors during the conference after falling a game short against Purefoods for a finals berth.

In the 2006-07 Philippine Cup, Miller led Alaska in numerous categories for the Aces.

In the 2007 Fiesta Conference, he led the Alaska Aces with the help of 2007 PBA Fiesta Conference Best Import Rossell Ellis to the championships once again after 5 years. The Alaska Aces won the championship against Talk 'N Text in seven games, despite being down 3–2 in the series, making it the club's 12th title. He also received the PBA Most Valuable Player once again in that season, as well as the PBA Finals MVP.

In the 08-09 PBA Philippine Cup All-Filipino Conference, Miller won his second best player of the conference award, with his team achieving the best record in the eliminations, and eventually moving on to the championship round. There, Miller averaged 15.7 points, 4.6 rebounds, and 6.5 assists. In Game 2, with Alaska down 84–89 with less than 7 minutes to play, he scored six points in a 16–0 run that eventually won them the game. Miller scored 15 points in Game 5, including a three-pointer with 8.7 seconds remaining. The Aces lost to the Talk 'N Text Tropang Texters in game seven, with Miller missing two free throws in the final 16 seconds.

==== Barangay Ginebra Kings (2010–2011) ====
===== 2010 Fiesta =====
In the middle of the Fiesta Conference, Alaska traded him to Ginebra in exchange for Cyrus Baguio who wanted to have more minutes. On his debut with the Kings, they lost to his former team. Ultimately, they ended their season in the quarterfinals to the Aces.

===== 2010-2011 Philippine Cup =====
Ginebra amassed a 10-4 card but it was only enough for 3rd place. They won against Alaska 2–1 with a 0–1 deficit, while trailing 20 points in the first quarter of game 3. But Miller was just limited to 2 points in game 1, and 1 point in game 3.

===== 2011 Commissioner's and Governors Cup =====
As the season went through, Miller's minutes winded down due to the rising of then rookies John Wilson and Robert Labagala as well as the return of Mark Caguioa's superstar game. Before the start of the playoffs of the third conference, he got traded to the then Air21 Express who were looking for a guard that could help Dondon Hontiveros.

==== Barako Bull Energy (2011–2012) ====
Miller joined the Air21 Express before the start of the 2011–2012 season. The Express renamed its team to Barako Bull Energy after the sale of the majority share of the Energy Food and Drinks, a subsidiary of Photokina Marketing that exclusively distributed Red Bull Energy Drink to the Philippines to the Lina Group of Companies.

==== GlobalPort Batang Pier (2012–2013) ====
Miller was involved in the biggest trade during the off-season before the 2012–13 season which sent him first to Barangay Ginebra before landing to GlobalPort.

==== Barako Bull Energy (2013–2014) ====
He was back in Barako Bull's arms again after he was traded in the offseason for center Enrico Villanueva. He was let go by the team after his contract expired last season and he contemplated retirement.

==== Return to Talk 'N Text (2015) ====
He agreed to terms with the Talk 'N Text Tropang Texters, a franchise he played several seasons for in the past. He won one Commissioner's Cup title with the Texters.

=== ASEAN Basketball League ===
==== Pilipinas MX3 Kings (2015–2016) ====
He agreed to terms with the Pacquiao Powervit Pilipinas Aguilas (which was later renamed to Pilipinas MX3 Kings) before the season start, a team which plays in the ASEAN Basketball League. He scored 12 points in his ABL debut.

== Coaching career ==
In November 2023, Miller was hired as an assistant coach of Converge FiberXers. In May 2024, Miller was named head coach of the Letran Squires, his alma mater's high school team, replacing Allen Ricardo, who was then named head coach of the Letran Knights, the college team. Miller led the Squires to a semifinals appearance, then left the team on the next season due to policy with Converge in regards to concurrent employment. Mller stayed as a consultant.

== International career ==
Miller was chosen by head coach Chot Reyes to play for the RP Training Pool in 2005. He played well for the Philippines in the FIBA Asia tournament and participated in the William Jones Cup in Taiwan, when the country finished third. However, Miller played only three games after suffering an injury and was replaced by Denok Miranda.

In 2006, Miller played for the team in a Qatar Invitational tournament along with the two-game exhibition against the Lebanon national basketball team.

In 2008, he was again included in the RP Training Pool under former coach, Yeng Guiao.

He was among the 12 players for Team Pilipinas that played in the 2009 FIBA Asia Championship.

== PBA career statistics ==
Legend
GP	Games played	MPG	Minutes per game
FG%	Field-goal percentage	3P%	3-point field-goal percentage	FT%	Free-throw percentage
RPG	Rebounds per game	APG	Assists per game	SPG	Steals per game
BPG	Blocks per game	PPG	Points per game	**Bold**	Career high

=== Season-by-season averages ===
Year	Team	GP	MPG	FG%	3P%	FT%	RPG	APG	SPG	BPG	PPG
2001	Red Bull	51	20.5	.416	.279	.759	2.8	2.3	.8	.1	7.7
2002	Red Bull	47	25.9	.414	.306	.705	3.6	3.6	1.0	**.2**	9.7
2003	Red Bull	43	30.0	.444	.329	.792	4.5	3.1	**1.4**	**.2**	14.2
2004–05	Talk 'N Text	**80**	35.4	.384	.324	.763	**5.9**	4.7	1.3	**.2**	16.1
2005–06	Talk 'N Text	48	31.1	.372	.338	.684	4.6	3.3	.8	.0	12.4
2005–06	Alaska	48	31.1	.372	.338	.684	4.6	3.3	.8	.0	12.4
2006–07	Alaska	53	**37.7**	.447	.353	.661	4.7	**5.2**	.8	.1	19.1
2007–08	Alaska	46	36.2	**.452**	.353	.719	5.2	4.5	1.1	.1	**20.7**
2008–09	Alaska	47	36.0	.399	.335	.663	5.4	4.8	.7	.1	16.5
2009–10	Alaska	49	30.6	.407	.349	.712	5.0	4.0	.7	.1	13.6
2009–10	Barangay Ginebra	49	30.6	.407	.349	.712	5.0	4.0	.7	.1	13.6
2010–11	Barangay Ginebra	49	26.9	.403	**.354**	.707	4.0	2.8	.6	.0	10.9
2011–12	Barako Bull	42	35.2	.434	.309	.752	4.5	4.3	1.0	.1	14.9
2012–13	GlobalPort	38	27.1	.378	.319	.693	4.3	3.5	.4	.1	11.2
2013–14	Barako Bull	33	23.9	.393	.273	.600	3.8	3.0	.3	.0	9.2
2014–15	Talk 'N Text	17	14.5	.366	.309	**.800**	1.7	1.8	.3	.0	4.8
Career		643	30.5	.411	.331	.716	4.5	3.8	.9	.1	13.5

== Coaching record ==
=== High school ===
Season	Team	Elimination round					Playoffs				
Season	Team	Finish	GP	W	L	PCT	GP	W	L	PCT	Results
2025	CSJL	2nd/9	9	6	3	.667	2	0	2	.000	Semifinals
