= 2002 Talk 'N Text Phone Pals season =

- Head coach: Louie Alas; Bill Bayno; Paul Woolpert
- General manager: Frankie Lim
- Owners: Smart Communications (an MVP Group subsidiary)

Governor's Cup results
- Record: 11–7 (61.1%)
- Place: 1st seed
- Playoff finish: Semifinals

Commissioner's Cup results
- Record: 13–10 (56.5%)
- Place: 7th seed
- Playoff finish: Runner-up

All-Filipino Cup results
- Record: 5–5 (50%)
- Place: 4th seed
- Playoff finish: QF (lost to Alaska)

Talk 'N Text Phone Pals seasons

The 2002 Talk 'N Text Phone Pals season was the 13th season of the franchise in the Philippine Basketball Association (PBA).

== Transactions ==
Players Added

Via Free Agency

- Alex Crisano (From Barangay Ginebra Kings)
- Kenny Evans (From Alaska Aces)
- Elmer Lago (From Barangay Ginebra Kings)
- Mark Telan (From Shell Turbo Chargers)
- Paul Alvarez (From FedEx Express in October 2002)
- Jercules Tangkay (Signed in October 2002; last played for Sta.Lucia)

Via Trade

- Donbel Belano (From Sta. Lucia Realtors in May 2002)
Players Lost

Via Free Agency

- Gido Babilonia (To FedEx Express)
- Jerry Codiñera (To FedEx Express)

Via Trade

- Gherome Ejercito (To Sta. Lucia Realtors in May 2002)

== Occurrences ==
Center Asi Taulava and guard Patrick Fran played for Philippine-Selecta team while forward Celedon Camaso played for Philippine-Hapee during the Governor's Cup. Taulava was among the 15 players chosen to play for the national team, Fran and Camaso went back to their mother ballclub starting the Commissioner's Cup.

Talk 'N Text coach Bill Bayno was fined by the PBA for lambasting the league and its commissioner for being a San Miguel Corporation-run league. For two conferences, the former University of Las Vegas coach has caused quite a stir with accusations and comments that cost him over P250,000 in record fines.

Starting the All-Filipino Cup, Talk 'N Text has tapped another American coach Paul Woolpert to replace Bill Bayno, who abandoned the Phone Pals after a short but controversial stint in the league.

== Finals stint ==
The Talk 'N Text Phone Pals reach the Commissioner's Cup finals opposite defending champion Batang Red Bull by winning over the Alaska Aces, three games to two, in their best-of-five semifinal series. The Phone Pals led in the finals series all throughout until the last two games which Red Bull won to successfully defend their Commissioner's Cup title.

== Roster ==
2002 Talk 'N Text Phone Pals roster
Players

Pos.	#	POB	Name	Height	Weight	DOB (YYYY–MM–DD)	From
G	1	(Philippines)	Bong Ravena	6 ft 1 in (1.85 m)			UE
G	2	(Philippines)	Jercules Tangkay (NA)	6 ft 0 in (1.83 m)			Southwestern-U
G/F	3	(Philippines)	Elmer Lago (M)	6 ft 2 in (1.88 m)			De La Salle
G	4	(United States)	Kenny Evans	6 ft 0 in (1.83 m)			San Francisco State
G	6	(Philippines)	Gilbert Demape	6 ft 1 in (1.85 m)			Cebu Tech
G	8	(Philippines)	Patrick Fran	6 ft 0 in (1.83 m)			UST
F	13	(Philippines)	Mark Telan	6 ft 6 in (1.98 m)			De La Salle
F	19	(Philippines)	Norman Gonzales	6 ft 4 in (1.93 m)			San Beda
F	20	(Philippines)	Don Camaso	6 ft 6 in (1.98 m)			Metro Manila Colleges
F	23	(Philippines)	Paul Alvarez (NA)	6 ft 0 in (1.83 m)			San Sebastian
F	33	(Philippines)	Victor Pablo	6 ft 4 in (1.93 m)			Far Eastern
G	42	(Philippines)	Donbel Belano (A)	5 ft 8 in (1.73 m)			Visayas
C	43	(United States)	Alex Crisano	6 ft 5 in (1.96 m)			Brooklyn
F/C	81	(Philippines)	Gabby Cui	6 ft 4 in (1.93 m)			Ateneo
C	88	(Tonga)	Asi Taulava	6 ft 9 in (2.06 m)			BYU–Hawaii
G/F	24	(United States)	Richie Frahm (G)	6 ft 5 in (1.96 m)			Gonzaga
F/C	40	(United States)	Jerald Honeycutt (G/C)	6 ft 8 in (2.03 m)			Tulane
G	5	(United States)	Danny Johnson (C)	6 ft 3 in (1.91 m)			Charleston (WV)
F	32	(United States)	Pete Mickeal (C)	6 ft 7 in (2.01 m)			Cincinnati
G	9	(Philippines)	Gherome Ejercito (T)	6 ft 2 in (1.88 m)			Adamson

Coaches
Head coach
- (United States) Bill Bayno
- (United States) Paul Woolpert
Assistant(s)
- (Philippines) Joel Banal
- (Philippines) Aric del Rosario
- (Philippines) Ariel Vanguardia
- (Philippines) Bong Go

Legend
- (DP) Unsigned draft pick
- (FA) Free agent
- (S) Suspended
- (G) Governor's Cup Import
- (C) Commissioner's Cup Import
- **(A) Acquired via trade
    - (T) Traded
    - (M) Moved to Ginebra
    - (NA) Newly-acquired in the AFC
- Injured

== Eliminations (Won games) ==
Date	Opponent	Score	Venue (Location)
February 22	RP-Hapee	95–62	Ynares Center
February 28	San Miguel	82–81	Makati Coliseum
March 7	Sta. Lucia	98–96	Makati Coliseum
March 16	Brgy. Ginebra	87–82	Cuneta Astrodome
March 23	RP-Selecta	83–76	Ynares Center
March 31	Shell	93–86	Araneta Coliseum
April 6	Alaska	84–67	Philsports Arena
April 9	Red Bull	98–90	Cuneta Astrodome
April 20	FedEx	101–90	Philsports Arena
June 16	Shell	89–72	Araneta Coliseum
June 22	FedEx	96–90	Cuneta Astrodome
June 27	Sta. Lucia	83–71	Cuneta Astrodome
July 14	Purefoods	109–92	Ynares Center
August 11	Alaska	80–76	Araneta Coliseum
October 30	FedEx	69–64	Ynares Center
November 9	Purefoods	78–75	Centennial Arena (Laoag City)
November 15	Red Bull	77–67	Ynares Center
November 24	Alaska	73–66	Araneta Coliseum
December 1	Brgy. Ginebra	86–65	Araneta Coliseum

Governor's Cup
Commissioner's Cup
All-Filipino Cup
