= 2002 Shell Turbo Chargers season =

- Head coach: Perry Ronquillo

Governor's Cup results
- Record: 2–9 (18.2%)
- Place: N/A
- Playoff finish: N/A

Commissioner's Cup results
- Record: 4–7 (36.4%)
- Place: 8th seed
- Playoff finish: QF (lost to Red Bull)

All-Filipino Cup results
- Record: 4–6 (40%)
- Place: 7th seed
- Playoff finish: QF (lost to San Miguel)

Shell Turbo Chargers seasons

The 2002 Shell Turbo Chargers season was the 18th season of the franchise in the Philippine Basketball Association (PBA).

== Transactions ==
Players Added

Via Draft

- All five players drafted
Players Lost

Via Free Agency

- Benito Cheng
- Joel Dualan
- Mark Telan (To Talk 'N Text Phone Pals)

== Summary ==
The Shell Turbo Chargers find it hard to score victories after another for the 2002 season. After winning over Coca-Cola, 90–82 on February 17, the Turbo Chargers lost eight in a row and bowed out of contention in the Governor's Cup, they won their last game against Sta.Lucia, 95–76, on the last day of eliminations on April 21.

They lost their first three assignments during the Commissioner's Cup but made it through the quarterfinal round as the 8th seeded team and were ousted by Batang Red Bull. With center Benjie Paras sitting out for most of their games during the season, Shell continued its back-to-back quarterfinal round in the All-Filipino Cup, the Turbo Chargers lost to San Miguel Beermen in one game.

== Roster ==
2002 Shell Turbo Chargers roster
Players

Pos.	#	POB	Name	Height	Weight	DOB (YYYY–MM–DD)	From
F	3	(United States)	Chris Jackson	6 ft 4 in (1.93 m)			San Bernardino
F	6	(Philippines)	Edwin Bacani	6 ft 3 in (1.91 m)			Far Eastern
G	7	(Philippines)	Rensy Bajar	5 ft 10 in (1.78 m)			San Beda
F	8	(Philippines)	Alejandro Lim	6 ft 4 in (1.93 m)			Visayas
G	9	(Philippines)	Chris Calaguio	6 ft 2 in (1.88 m)			Letran
G	12	(Philippines)	Porferio Marzan	6 ft 2 in (1.88 m)			University of Baguio
C	14	(Philippines)	Benjie Paras	6 ft 5 in (1.96 m)			Philippines
F	16	(Philippines)	Frederick Canlas	6 ft 7 in (2.01 m)			Saint Francis of Assisi
G/F	18	(Philippines)	Reinier Sison	6 ft 1 in (1.85 m)			Ateneo
G	30	(Philippines)	Gerry Esplana	6 ft 0 in (1.83 m)			Far Eastern
F	32	(Philippines)	Mike Hrabak	6 ft 6 in (1.98 m)			Central Arizona
G	33	(United States)	Rob Wainwright	6 ft 5 in (1.96 m)			Solano Community College
C	34	(Philippines)	Art Del Rosario	6 ft 5 in (1.96 m)
G	35	(United States)	Tony Dela Cruz	6 ft 4 in (1.93 m)			UC Irvine
G	50	(Philippines)	Dale Singson	6 ft 0 in (1.83 m)			UST
F	24	(United States)	Askia Jones (G/C)	6 ft 3 in (1.91 m)			Kansas State
F/C	4	(United States)	Nantambu Willingham (G)	6 ft 8 in (2.03 m)			University of Connecticut
F/C	42	(United States)	Derek Grimm (G)	6 ft 9 in (2.06 m)			University of Missouri
F	23	(United States)	Cedric Webber (G/C)	6 ft 6 in (1.98 m)			University of Charleston
F		(United States)	Johnny Jackson (C)	6 ft 7 in (2.01 m)			University of Mississippi
F		(United States)	George Banks (C)	6 ft 7 in (2.01 m)			Texas- El Paso

Coaches
Head coach
- (Philippines) Perry Ronquillo
Assistant(s)
- (Philippines) Joey Guanio
- (Philippines) Jonas Mendoza

Legend
- (DP) Unsigned draft pick
- (FA) Free agent
- (S) Suspended
- (G) Governor's Cup imports
- (C) Commissioner's Cup imports
- Injured

== Eliminations (Won games) ==
Date	Opponent	Score	Venue (Location)
February 17	Coca-Cola	90–82	Araneta Coliseum
April 21	Sta.Lucia	95–76	Araneta Coliseum
July 6	Red Bull	82–81	Araneta Coliseum
July 13	Alaska	78–76	Cuneta Astrodome
July 18	RP-Selecta	61–57	Caruncho Gym (Pasig)
August 1	Brgy.Ginebra	72–71	Philsports Arena
November 6	Talk 'N Text	67–64	Cuneta Astrodome
November 15	Brgy.Ginebra	71–65	Ynares Center
November 27	FedEx	76–75	Philsports Arena
December 4	Purefoods	77–71	Philsports Arena

Governor's Cup
Commissioner's Cup
All-Filipino Cup
