= 2002 Red Bull Thunder season =

- Head coach: Yeng Guiao
- General Manager: Tony Chua
- Owner: Tony Chua

Governor's Cup results
- Record: 8–8 (50%)
- Place: 6th seed
- Playoff finish: Semifinals

Commissioner's Cup results
- Record: 15–7 (68.2%)
- Place: 1st seed
- Playoff finish: Champions (def. Talk 'N Text 4-3)

All-Filipino Cup results
- Record: 10–4 (71.4%)
- Place: 1st seed
- Playoff finish: Semis (lost to Alaska)

Red Bull Thunder seasons

The 2002 Red Bull Thunder season was the 3rd season of the franchise in the Philippine Basketball Association (PBA).

== Occurrences ==
Fil-foreigners Davonn Harp and Mick Pennissi were selected as aspirants for the National team in the coming Busan Asian Games in South Korea. Both players were on loan to the Philippine-Hapee toothpaste training squad during the season's first offing.

== Championship ==
Last year's Commissioner's Cup Best Import Tony Lang came back and teamed up with fellow returnee Julius Nwosu to help Batang Red Bull retain the title they won last season. The Thunder reached the finals against Talk 'N Text Phone Pals. After four games and the series tied at two games apiece, Lang was accused of game-fixing and was replaced by NBA veteran Sean Lampley.

Batang Red Bull won their second PBA title in three years by defeating the Talk 'N Text Phone Pals in seven games. The Thunder overcame a 2-3 series deficit by taking the last two games to successfully defend the Commissioner's Cup crown.

== Transactions ==
Players Added

Via Draft

- Homer Se

Via Free Agency

- Oliver Agapito (From defunct Tanduay Rhum Masters)
- Nelson Asaytono (Signed in March 2002; from defunct Pop Cola Panthers)
- Vince Hizon (Last played in the MBA)
- Noli Locsin (From defunct Tanduay Rhum Masters)
- Erwin Velez (Drafted by Mobiline in 2000)
Players Lost

Via Free Agency

- Lowell Briones (To Coca Cola Tigers)

Via Trade

- Kerby Raymundo (To Purefoods TJ Hotdogs for next year's 1st and 2nd round picks)

== Roster ==
2002 Red Bull Thunder roster
Players

Pos.	#	POB	Name	Height	Weight	DOB (YYYY–MM–DD)	From
G	3	(Philippines)	Jimwell Torion	5 ft 9 in (1.75 m)			SCSIT
F	4	(United States)	Davonn Harp	6 ft 4 in (1.93 m)			Kutztown
F	6	(Philippines)	Noli Locsin	6 ft 3 in (1.91 m)			De La Salle
F	7	(Australia)	Mick Pennisi	6 ft 9 in (2.06 m)			Eastern Michigan
F	8	(Philippines)	Nelson Asaytono	6 ft 3 in (1.91 m)			Manila
F	9	(Philippines)	Jay Mendoza	6 ft 3 in (1.91 m)			Mapúa
F	10	(Philippines)	Junthy Valenzuela	6 ft 2 in (1.88 m)			SCSIT
G	11	(Philippines)	Willie Miller	5 ft 10 in (1.78 m)			Letran
G/F	12	(Philippines)	Vince Hizon	6 ft 2 in (1.88 m)			Ateneo
G	13	(Philippines)	Anton Villoria	5 ft 11 in (1.80 m)			Letran
F	15	(Philippines)	Lordy Tugade	6 ft 3 in (1.91 m)			National-U
F	16	(Philippines)	Homer Se	6 ft 5 in (1.96 m)			San Sebastian
F	19	(Philippines)	Erwin Velez	6 ft 3 in (1.91 m)			Letran
F	20	(Philippines)	Edmund Reyes	6 ft 3 in (1.91 m)			UST
C	22	(Philippines)	Oliver Agapito	6 ft 6 in (1.98 m)			St. Benilde
F	45	(United States)	Joe Bunn (G)	6 ft 3 in (1.91 m)			Phillips
F	99	(United States)	Julius Nwosu (G/C)	6 ft 8 in (2.03 m)			Liberty
F	42	(United States)	Antonio Lang (G/C)	6 ft 8 in (2.03 m)			Duke
F	21 & 88	(United States)	Sean Lampley (G/C)	6 ft 7 in (2.01 m)			California

Coaches

Head coach

- (Philippines) Yeng Guiao

Assistant coach(es)

- (Philippines) Roehl Nadurata
- (Philippines) Rudolf Hines
- (Philippines) Gil Lumberio
- (Philippines) Andy Jao

Legend

- (C) Team captain
- (G) Governor's Cup Import
- Injured

== Eliminations (Won games) ==
Date	Opponent	Score	Venue (Location)
February 12	Shell	94-81	Philsports Arena
February 17	FedEx	107-99	Araneta Coliseum
February 24	RP-Selecta	80-69	Philsports Arena
March 9	RP-Hapee	90-82	Cuneta Astrodome
March 17	Sta.Lucia	91-85	Araneta Coliseum
April 20	Purefoods	93-77	Philsports Arena
June 16	Brgy.Ginebra	81-69	Araneta Coliseum
June 23	Alaska	85-77	Araneta Coliseum
June 30	Sta.Lucia	66-62	Araneta Coliseum
July 11	San Miguel	78-73	Cuneta Astrodome
July 14	Coca Cola	72-60	Ynares Center
July 26	RP-Selecta	75-51	Ynares Center
July 28	Talk 'N Text	92-80	Araneta Coliseum
October 23	Coca Cola	76-70	Philsports Arena
October 27	Alaska	59-57	Araneta Coliseum
November 6	Sta.Lucia	66-58	Cuneta Astrodome
November 10	San Miguel	75-74 OT	Araneta Coliseum
November 20	Purefoods	96-66	Cuneta Astrodome
November 23	Shell	82-65	Cuneta Astrodome
November 29	Brgy.Ginebra	84-67	Cuneta Astrodome
December 1	FedEx	80-77	Araneta Coliseum

Governor's Cup
Commissioner's Cup
All-Filipino Cup
