= RP-Selecta Ice Cream =

2002 RP-Selecta Ice Cream season
- Head coach: Allan Caidic

Governors' Cup results
- Record: 4–7 (36.4%)
- Place: N/A
- Playoff finish: N/A

RP-Selecta Ice Cream seasons

The 2002 Philippine Team-Selecta Ice Cream is one of the two teams which sponsored a national pool that played in the 2002 PBA Governors' Cup as part of the league's continued support to the Philippine men's national basketball team that will compete in the 2002 Asian Games in Busan, South Korea. A total of 30 players were picked and divided into two groups.

National team coach Jong Uichico serves as the monitoring body on the overall progress of the two training squads. The 15-man lineup was finalized after the Governors' Cup and played in the Commissioner's Cup as one team and still under the sponsorship of Selecta.

== Roster ==
RP-Selecta Ice Cream roster
Players
Coaches

Pos.	No.	Nat.	Name	Ht.	Wt.
G		(United States)	Jimmy Alapag	5 ft 9 in (1.75 m)
G	9	(Philippines)	Chris Calaguio	6 ft 2 in (1.88 m)		Shell Turbo Chargers
F		(United States)	Chris Clay	6 ft 8 in (2.03 m)
G/F	19	(Philippines)	Kenneth Duremdes	6 ft 3 in (1.91 m)		Alaska Aces (PBA)
F/C	16	(Philippines)	Dennis Espino	6 ft 6 in (1.98 m)		Sta. Lucia Realtors
F/C		(United States)	Jeffrey Flowers	6 ft 9 in (2.06 m)
G	8	(Philippines)	Patrick Fran	6 ft 0 in (1.83 m)		Talk 'N Text Tropang Texters
G	7	(Philippines)	Dondon Hontiveros	6 ft 2 in (1.88 m)		San Miguel Beermen
F	3	(United States)	Chris Jackson	6 ft 4 in (1.93 m)		Shell Turbo Chargers
C	32	(Philippines)	Poch Juinio	6 ft 5 in (1.96 m)		Coca Cola Tigers
C	30	(United States)	Eric Menk	6 ft 6 in (1.98 m)		Barangay Ginebra Kings
F	2	(United States)	Ali Peek	6 ft 4 in (1.93 m)		Alaska Aces (PBA)
G	17	(Philippines)	Olsen Racela	5 ft 10 in (1.78 m)		San Miguel Beermen
C	4	(United States)	Rafi Reavis	6 ft 8 in (2.03 m)		Coca Cola Tigers
C	55	(United States)	Asi Taulava	6 ft 9 in (2.06 m)		Talk 'N Text Phone Pals

Head coach

- Allan Caidic

Legend

- (C) Team captain
- Injured
