= 2002 PBA season =

28th PBA season

- Duration: February 10 – December 25, 2002
- Teams: 10
- TV partner(s): Local: Viva TV (IBC); International: The Filipino Channel

2002 PBA Draft
- Top draft pick: Yancy de Ocampo
- Picked by: FedEx Express
- Season MVP: Willie Miller (Batang Red Bull Thunder)
- Governors Cup champions: Purefoods TJ Hotdogs
- Governors Cup runners-up: Alaska Aces
- Commissioner's Cup champions: Batang Red Bull Thunder
- Commissioner's Cup runners-up: Talk 'N Text Phone Pals
- All-Filipino Cup champions: Coca-Cola Tigers
- All-Filipino Cup runners-up: Alaska Aces

Seasons
- ← 2001 2003 →

The 2002 PBA season was the 28th season of the Philippine Basketball Association (PBA).

== Board of governors ==
=== Executive committee ===
- Emilio Bernardino, Jr. (Commissioner)
- Francisco Alejo III (Chairman, representing Purefoods TJ Hotdogs)
- Casiano Cabalan Jr. (Vice-Chairman, representing Barangay Ginebra Kings)
- Angelito Alvarez (Treasurer, representing FedEx Express)

=== Teams ===
Team	Company	Governor	Alternate Governor
Alaska Aces	Alaska Milk Corporation	Wilfred Steven Uytengsu	Joaquin Trillo
Barangay Ginebra Kings	La Tondeña Distillers, Inc.	Casiano Cabalan Jr.	Ira Daniel Maniquis
Batang Red Bull Thunder	Photokina Marketing Corporation	George Chua	Manuel Mendoza
Coca Cola Tigers	Coca-Cola Bottlers Philippines, Inc.	Jose Bayani Baylon	Emmanuel Puno
FedEx Express	Airfreight 2100, Inc.	Angelito Alvarez	
Purefoods TJ Hotdogs	Purefoods Corporation	Francisco Alejo III	Ely Capacio
Sta. Lucia Realtors	Sta. Lucia Realty and Development Corporation	Manuel Encarnado	Ariel Magno
San Miguel Beermen	San Miguel Brewery, Inc.	Alberto Malapit	
Shell Turbo Chargers	Pilipinas Shell Petroleum Corporation	Roberto Kanapi	
Talk 'N Text Phone Pals	Philippine Long Distance Telephone Company	Victorico Vargas	Al Panlilio

== Notable occurrences ==
- The league revised its season calendar to accommodate the participation of its players for the upcoming 2002 Asian Games. The Governors' Cup became the first conference of the season while the All-Filipino became the third and final conference.
- The pool for the national team were divided into two teams: Selecta-RP and Hapee-RP. Both teams participated for the Governors' Cup. The teams were later merged to form the final lineup of the national team in the Commissioner's Cup, retaining the Selecta-RP branding.
- Talk 'N Text coach Bill Bayno was fined PHP200,000 after publicly criticizing the league and its official. This came after Bayno branded the league as "San Miguel Basketball Association" and charged the league officials are favoring the four SMC-owned teams (San Miguel Beermen, Barangay Ginebra Kings, Coca Cola Tigers and Purefoods TJ Hotdogs).
- This was the last season in which the Commissioner's and Governors Cup were disputed before the tournaments were reinstated in the 2010–11 season. They were replaced in 2003 by the Invitational and Reinforced Conferences in 2003, and eventually the Fiesta Conference in 2004 after the league reduced the number of conferences in a PBA season to two.

== Opening ceremonies ==
The muses for the participating teams are as follows:

Team	Muse
Alaska Aces	Pia Guanio
Batang Red Bull Thunder	Assunta de Rossi and Alessandra de Rossi
Barangay Ginebra Kings	Rica Peralejo
Coca-Cola Tigers	Thalia Parks and Yeng Serrano
FedEx Express	Patricia Coronado
Purefoods TJ Hotdogs	Zorayda Andam
San Miguel Beermen	Anna Shire
Shell Turbo Chargers	LJ Moreno
Sta. Lucia Realtors	Juliet Duncan
Talk 'N Text Phone Pals	Cheska Garcia

== 2002 PBA Governors' Cup ==
=== Elimination round ===
Pos	Team	W	L	PCT	GB	Qualification
1	Talk 'N Text Phone Pals	9	2	.818	—	Twice-to-beat in the quarterfinals
2	Coca-Cola Tigers	8	3	.727 (Note: Head-to-head record: Coca-Cola 1–0 Purefoods)	1	Twice-to-beat in the quarterfinals
3	Purefoods TJ Hotdogs	8	3	.727	1	Twice-to-beat in the quarterfinals
4	Alaska Aces	6	5	.545 (Note: Head-to-head differential: Alaska +9, FedEx +6, Red Bull −15)	3	Twice-to-beat in the quarterfinals
5	FedEx Express	6	5	.545	3	Twice-to-win in the quarterfinals
6	Batang Red Bull Thunder	6	5	.545	3	Twice-to-win in the quarterfinals
7	Sta. Lucia Realtors	5	6	.455 (Note: Head-to-head record: Sta. Lucia 1–0 San Miguel)	4	Twice-to-win in the quarterfinals
8	San Miguel Beermen	5	6	.455	4	Twice-to-win in the quarterfinals
9	RP-Hapee Toothpaste (G)	4	7	.364 (Note: Head-to-head record: Hapee 1–0 Selecta)	5	
10	RP-Selecta Ice Cream (G)	4	7	.364	5	
11	Barangay Ginebra Kings	3	8	.273	6	
12	Shell Turbo Chargers	2	9	.182	7	

Source: PBA.ph
(G) Guests

=== Playoffs ===
Quarterfinals (Top 4 twice-to-beat)
1	Talk 'N Text	70	70
8	San Miguel	79	81
4	Alaska	74
5	FedEx	71
2	Coca Cola	75
7	Sta. Lucia	65
3	Purefoods	82
6	Red Bull	77

Semifinals (Best-of-5)
8	San Miguel	2
4	Alaska	3
2	Coca Cola	2
3	Purefoods	3

Finals (Best-of-7)
4	Alaska	3
3	Purefoods	4
Third place playoff
8	San Miguel	63
2	Coca Cola	75

==== Quarterfinals ====
Team 1	Series	Team 2	Game 1	Game 2
(1) Talk 'N Text Phone Pals*	0–2	(8) San Miguel Beermen	70–79	70–81
(2) Coca-Cola Tigers*	1–0	(7) Sta. Lucia Realtors	75–65	—
(3) Purefoods TJ Hotdogs*	1–0	(6) Batang Red Bull Thunder	82–77	—
(4) Alaska Aces*	1–0	(5) FedEx Express	74–71	—

*Team has twice-to-beat advantage. Team 1 only has to win once, while Team 2 has to win twice.

==== Semifinals ====
Team 1	Series	Team 2	Game 1	Game 2	Game 3	Game 4	Game 5
(2) Purefoods TJ Hotdogs	3–2	(3) Coca-Cola Tigers	89–86	84–75	72–77	59–64	78–75
(4) Alaska Aces	3–2	(8) San Miguel Beermen	66–72	67–63 (OT)	61–68	74–63	65–62

==== Third place playoff ====
Team 1	Score	Team 2
(3) Coca-Cola Tigers	75–63	(8) San Miguel Beermen

==== Finals ====
Team 1	Series	Team 2	Game 1	Game 2	Game 3	Game 4	Game 5	Game 6	Game 7
(3) Purefoods TJ Hotdogs	4–3	(4) Alaska Aces	73–79	102–106 (2OT)	80–66	82–76	84–72	78–85	91–76

== 2002 PBA Commissioner's Cup ==
=== Elimination round ===
Pos	Team	W	L	PCT	GB	Qualification
1	Batang Red Bull Thunder	7	3	.700 (Note: Head-to-head record: Red Bull 1–0 Sta. Lucia)	—	Twice-to-beat in the quarterfinals
2	Sta. Lucia Realtors	7	3	.700	—	Twice-to-beat in the quarterfinals
3	Alaska Aces	6	4	.600 (Note: Head-to-head record: Alaska 3–0, San Miguel 2–1, Coca-Cola 1–2, FedEx 0–3)	1	Twice-to-beat in the quarterfinals
4	San Miguel Beermen	6	4	.600	1	Twice-to-beat in the quarterfinals
5	Coca-Cola Tigers	6	4	.600	1	Twice-to-win in the quarterfinals
6	FedEx Express	6	4	.600	1	Twice-to-win in the quarterfinals
7	Talk 'N Text Phone Pals	5	5	.500	2	Twice-to-win in the quarterfinals
8	Shell Velocity	4	6	.400	3	Twice-to-win in the quarterfinals
9	RP-Selecta Ice Cream (G)	3	7	.300 (Note: Head-to-head record: Selecta 1–0 Purefoods)	4	
10	Purefoods TJ Hotdogs	3	7	.300	4	
11	Barangay Ginebra Kings	2	8	.200	5	

Source: PBA.ph
(G) Guests

=== Playoffs ===
Quarterfinals (Top 4 twice-to-beat)
1	Red Bull	73
8	Shell	54
4	San Miguel	80	90*
5	Coca-Cola	84	84
2	Sta. Lucia	79	70
7	Talk 'N Text	87	80
3	Alaska	76	82
6	FedEx	79	67

Semifinals (Best-of-5)
1	Red Bull	3
4	San Miguel	1
7	Talk 'N Text	3
3	Alaska	2

Finals (Best-of-7)
1	Red Bull	4
7	Talk 'N Text	3
Third-place playoff
4	San Miguel	88
3	Alaska	85

*Overtime

==== Quarterfinals ====
Team 1	Series	Team 2	Game 1	Game 2
(1) Batang Red Bull Thunder*	1–0	(8) Shell Turbo Chargers	73–54	—
(2) Sta. Lucia Realtors*	0–2	(7) Talk 'N Text Phone Pals	79–87	70–80
(3) Alaska Aces*	1–1	(6) FedEx Express	76–79	82–67
(4) San Miguel Beermen*	1–1	(5) Coca-Cola Tigers	80–84	90–84 (OT)

*Team has twice-to-beat advantage. Team 1 only has to win once, while Team 2 has to win twice.

==== Semifinals ====
Team 1	Series	Team 2	Game 1	Game 2	Game 3	Game 4	Game 5
(1) Batang Red Bull Thunder	3–1	(4) San Miguel Beermen	72–68	83–80	68–102	85–80	—
(3) Alaska Aces	3–2	(7) Talk 'N Text Phone Pals	78–82	79–87	84–81	82–76	73–89

==== Third place playoff ====
Team 1	Score	Team 2
(3) Alaska Aces	85–88	(4) San Miguel Beermen

==== Finals ====
Team 1	Series	Team 2	Game 1	Game 2	Game 3	Game 4	Game 5	Game 6	Game 7
(1) Batang Red Bull Thunder	4–3	(7) Talk 'N Text Phone Pals	100–102	96–86	71–80	89–81	55–77	86–78	67–60

== 2002 PBA All-Filipino Cup ==
=== Elimination round ===
Pos	Team	W	L	PCT	GB	Qualification
1	Batang Red Bull Thunder	8	1	.889	—	Advance to semifinals
2	San Miguel Beermen	6	3	.667 (Note: Head-to-head record: San Miguel 1–0 Coca-Cola)	2	Advance to semifinals
3	Coca-Cola Tigers	6	3	.667	2	Advance to quarterfinals
4	Talk 'N Text Phone Pals	5	4	.556 (Note: Head-to-head record: Alaska 1–0 Talk 'N Text)	3	Advance to quarterfinals
5	Alaska Aces	5	4	.556	3	Advance to quarterfinals
6	Sta. Lucia Realtors	4	5	.444 (Note: Sixth-seed playoff: Sta. Lucia 70–69 Shell)	4	Advance to quarterfinals
7	Shell Velocity	4	5	.444	4	
8	Purefoods TJ Hotdogs	3	6	.333 (Note: Head-to-head record: Barangay Ginebra 1–0 Purefoods)	5	
9	Barangay Ginebra Kings	3	6	.333	5	
10	FedEx Express	1	8	.111	7	

Source: PBA.ph

=== Playoffs ===
Quarterfinals (Single elimination)
4	Talk 'N Text	63
5	Alaska	82
3	Coca-Cola	64
6	Sta. Lucia	61

Semifinals (Best-of-3)
1	Red Bull	1
5	Alaska	2
2	San Miguel	1
3	Coca-Cola	2

Finals (Best-of-5)
5	Alaska	1
3	Coca-Cola	3
Third place
1	Red Bull	81
2	San Miguel	83

==== Quarterfinals ====
Team 1	Score	Team 2
(3) Coca-Cola Tigers	64–61	(6) Sta. Lucia Realtors
(4) Talk 'N Text Phone Pals	63–82	(5) Alaska Aces

==== Semifinals ====
Team 1	Series	Team 2	Game 1	Game 2	Game 3
(1) Red Bull Thunder	1–2	(5) Alaska Aces	79–70	68–83	71–80
(2) Coca-Cola Tigers	2–1	(3) San Miguel Beermen	62–76	74–62	62–74

==== Third place playoff ====
Team 1	Score	Team 2
(1) Red Bull Thunder	81–83	(2) San Miguel Beermen

==== Finals ====
Team 1	Series	Team 2	Game 1	Game 2	Game 3	Game 4	Game 5
(3) Coca-Cola Tigers	3–1	(5) Alaska Aces	67–70	72–69 (OT)	62–60 (OT)	78–63	—

== Awards ==
- Most Valuable Player: Willie Miller (Red Bull)
- Rookie of the Year: Ren-Ren Ritualo (FedEx)
- Sportsmanship Award: Paolo Mendoza (Sta. Lucia)
- Most Improved Player: Rob Duat (Alaska)
- Defensive Player of the Year: Davonn Harp (Red Bull)
- Mythical Five
  - Willie Miller (Red Bull)
  - Davonn Harp (Red Bull)
  - Jeffrey Cariaso (Coca-Cola)
  - Victor Pablo (Talk 'N Text)
  - Don Allado (Alaska)
- Mythical Second Team
  - Asi Taulava (Talk 'N Text)
  - Gilbert Demape (Talk 'N Text)
  - Nic Belasco (San Miguel)
  - Kerby Raymundo (Purefoods)
  - Rey Evangelista (Purefoods)
- All Defensive Team
  - Davonn Harp (Red Bull)
  - Chris Jackson (Shell)
  - Rudy Hatfield (Coca-Cola)
  - Jeffrey Cariaso (Coca-Cola)
  - Rey Evangelista (Purefoods)

=== Awards given by the PBA Press Corps ===
- Coach of the Year: Ryan Gregorio (Purefoods)
- Mr. Quality Minutes: Ato Morano (Coca-Cola)
- Executive of the Year: George C. Chua (Red Bull)
- Comeback Player of the Year: Ronnie Magsanoc (Purefoods)
- Referee of the Year: Mario Montiel

== Cumulative standings ==
Pos	Team	Pld	W	L	PCT	Best finish
1	Coca-Cola Tigers	47	31	16	.660	Champions
2	Batang Red Bull Thunder	47	30	17	.638	Champions
3	Talk 'N Text Phone Pals	47	27	20	.574	Finalist
4	San Miguel Beermen	49	26	23	.531	Third place
5	Alaska Aces	59	31	28	.525	Finalist
6	Purefoods TJ Hotdogs	43	22	21	.512	Champions
7	Sta. Lucia Realtors	35	17	18	.486	Quarterfinalist
8	FedEx Express	33	14	19	.424	Quarterfinalist
9	RP-Hapee Toothpaste (G)	11	4	7	.364	Elimination round
10	Shell Turbo Chargers	32	10	22	.313	Quarterfinalist
11	Barangay Ginebra Kings	30	8	22	.267	Elimination round
12	RP-Selecta Ice Cream (G)	21	7	14	.333	Elimination round

(G) Guests

=== Elimination round ===
Pos	Team	Pld	W	L	PCT
1	Batang Red Bull Thunder	30	21	9	.700
2	Coca-Cola Tigers	30	20	10	.667
3	Talk 'N Text Phone Pals	30	19	11	.633
4	Alaska Aces	30	17	13	.567 (Note: Elimination round head-to-head: Alaska 2–1 San Miguel)
5	San Miguel Beermen	30	17	13	.567
6	Sta. Lucia Realtors	30	16	14	.533
7	Purefoods TJ Hotdogs	30	14	16	.467
8	FedEx Express	30	13	17	.433
9	RP-Hapee Toothpaste (G)	11	4	7	.364
10	Shell Turbo Chargers	30	10	20	.333
11	RP-Selecta Ice Cream (G)	21	7	14	.333
12	Barangay Ginebra Kings	30	8	22	.267

(G) Guests

=== Playoffs ===
Pos	Team	Pld	W	L
1	Alaska Aces	29	14	15
2	Coca-Cola Tigers	17	10	7
3	San Miguel Beermen	19	10	9
4	Batang Red Bull Thunder	17	9	8
5	Purefoods TJ Hotdogs	13	8	5
6	Talk 'N Text Phone Pals	17	8	9
7	FedEx Express	3	1	2
8	Sta. Lucia Realotrs	5	1	4
9	Shell Turbo Chargers	2	0	2
10	Barangay Ginebra Kings	0	0	0
