= 2002 Alaska Aces season =

- Head coach: Tim Cone
- General Manager: Joaqui Trillo
- Owner(s): Fred Uytengsu

Governor's Cup results
- Record: 15–9 (62.5%)
- Place: 4th seed
- Playoff finish: Runner-up

Commissioner's Cup results
- Record: 9–9 (50%)
- Place: 3rd seed
- Playoff finish: Semis (lost to TNT)

All-Filipino Cup results
- Record: 9–8 (52.9%)
- Place: 5th seed
- Playoff finish: Runner-up

Alaska Aces seasons

The 2002 Alaska Aces season was the 17th season of the franchise in the Philippine Basketball Association (PBA).

== Transactions ==
Players Added

Via Draft

- Miguel Noble

Via Free Agency

- Jojo Lastimosa (From defunct Pop Cola Panthers)
- Philip Newton (Undrafted rookie)
- Alvin Teng

Via Trade

- Robert Duat (From San Miguel Beermen in June 2002)
- EJ Feihl (From Barangay Ginebra Kings in June 2002)
Players Lost

Via Free Agency

- Kenny Evans (To Talk 'N Text Phone Pals)

Via Trade

- Bryan Gahol (To San Miguel Beermen in June 2002)
- James Walkvist (To Barangay Ginebra Kings in June 2002)

== Finals stint ==
The Alaska Aces made it to the finals twice in the 2002 season, they lost to Purefoods TJ Hotdogs in seven games for the Governor's Cup title. After placing fourth in the Commissioner's Cup, the Aces reach the All-Filipino Cup finals with a 2–1 series win over top-seeded Red Bull Thunder in their best-of-three semifinals. Alaska went on to play the Coca-Cola Tigers in the championship, the Aces lost in four games to the first-year ballclub in the best-of-five finals series.

== Roster ==
2002 Alaska Aces roster
Players

Pos.	#	POB	Name	Height	Weight	DOB (YYYY–MM–DD)	From
G	1	(United States)	Philip Newton	6 ft 2 in (1.88 m)
F	2	(United States)	Ali Peek	6 ft 4 in (1.93 m)			Saint Mary's
F	3	(Philippines)	Glen Peter Yap	6 ft 3 in (1.91 m)			Adamson
F	5	(United States)	Rob Duat (A)	6 ft 4 in (1.93 m)			Menlo
G	6	(Philippines)	Jojo Lastimosa	6 ft 0 in (1.83 m)			USJ–R
G	7	(United States)	Jon Ordonio	6 ft 2 in (1.88 m)			Master's
C	8	(Philippines)	Don Allado	6 ft 6 in (1.98 m)			De La Salle
G	9	(Philippines)	Rodney Santos	6 ft 1 in (1.85 m)			San Sebastian
F	10	(Philippines)	Eric Reyes	6 ft 3 in (1.91 m)			Ateneo
G	11	(Philippines)	Richie Ticzon	5 ft 8 in (1.73 m)			Ateneo
F	18	(Philippines)	Alvin Teng	6 ft 4 in (1.93 m)			Arellano
G/F	19	(Philippines)	Kenneth Duremdes	6 ft 3 in (1.91 m)			Adamson
F	31	(United States)	John Arigo	6 ft 4 in (1.93 m)			Tampa
C	32	(Philippines)	EJ Feihl (A)	7 ft 1 in (2.16 m)			Adamson
F	41	(United States)	Miguel Noble	6 ft 5 in (1.96 m)			Utica
F	32	(United States)	Ron Riley (G)	6 ft 5 in (1.96 m)			Arizona State
F	5	(United States)	James Head (G)	6 ft 7 in (2.01 m)			Eastern Michigan
F/C	42	(United States)	Muntrelle Dobbins (G)	6 ft 6 in (1.98 m)			Little Rock
G/F	23	(United States)	Chris Carawell (C)	6 ft 4 in (1.93 m)			Duke
F/C	3	(United States)	Ajani Williams (C)	6 ft 10 in (2.08 m)			Eastern Michigan
F	21	(Philippines)	Bryan Gahol (T)	6 ft 4 in (1.93 m)			Philippines
C	22	(United States)	James Walkvist (T)	6 ft 10 in (2.08 m)

Coaches
Head coach
- (United States) Tim Cone
Assistant(s)
- (Philippines) Dickie Bachmann
- (Philippines) Gilbert Reyes
- (Philippines) Luigi Trillo

Legend
- (DP) Unsigned draft pick
- (FA) Free agent
- (S) Suspended
- (G) Governor's Cup imports
  (C) Commissioner's Cup imports
  (A) Acquired via trade
  (T) Traded
- Injured

== Eliminations (Won games) ==
Date	Opponent	Score	Venue (Location)
February 15	Brgy.Ginebra	68-63	Centrodome (Malolos, Bulacan)
February 21	RP-Selecta	56-52	Makati Coliseum
March 2	Red Bull	81-58	Cuneta Astrodome
March 21	RP-Hapee	68-61	Makati Coliseum
April 13	Shell	83-55	Philsports Arena
April 21	San Miguel	74-58	Araneta Coliseum
June 20	San Miguel	77-69	Cuneta Astrodome
June 30	Purefoods	83-79	Araneta Coliseum
July 6	FedEx	82-73	Araneta Coliseum
July 27	Brgy.Ginebra	80-63	Ynares Center
August 2	Coca-Cola	73-72	Philsports Arena
August 4	RP-Selecta	84-59	Araneta Coliseum
October 23	Shell	69-67	Philsports Arena
November 8	FedEx	85-84	Cuneta Astrodome
November 16	Coca-Cola	85-68	(Dumaguete City)
November 22	Brgy.Ginebra	79-75	Philsports Arena
November 30	Sta.Lucia	67-57	Ynares Center

Governor's Cup
Commissioner's Cup
All-Filipino Cup
