= 2002 San Miguel Beermen season =

- Head coach: Siot Tanquingcen; Jong Uichico
- General manager: Robert Non
- Owner: San Miguel Corporation

Governor's Cup results
- Record: 5–6 (45.5%)
- Place: N/A
- Playoff finish: N/A

Commissioner's Cup results
- Record: 9–8 (52.9%)
- Place: 4th seed
- Playoff finish: Semis (lost to Red Bull)

All-Filipino Cup results
- Record: 9–5 (64.3%)
- Place: 2nd seed
- Playoff finish: Semis (lost to Coca-Cola)

San Miguel Beermen seasons

The 2002 San Miguel Beermen season was the 28th season of the franchise in the Philippine Basketball Association (PBA).

== Transactions ==
Players Added

Via draft

- Alvin Castro

Via trade

- Bryan Gahol (From Alaska Aces in June 2002)
- Dondon Hontiveros (From defunct Tanduay Rhum Masters)
Players Lost

Via Free Agency

- Freddie Abuda (To Coca Cola Tigers; originally traded to Tanduay)

Via Trade

- Robert Duat (To Alaska Aces in June 2002)

== National team ==
Four members of the San Miguel Beermen namely Danny Seigle, Olsen Racela, two-time MVP Danny Ildefonso and newly acquired Dondon Hontiveros from the defunct Tanduay ballclub were chosen to comprised the 15-man lineup of the Philippine national team that will participate in the Asian Games in Busan, South Korea in October. SMB coach Jong Uichico was given the tasks to handle the nationals. Assistant coach Siot Tanquingcen takes over the coaching chores of the Beermen on an interim basis. During the Governor's Cup, Danny Seigle, Olsen Racela and Dondon Hontiveros played for Philippine team-Selecta while Danny Ildefonso played for Philippine team-Hapee Toothpaste.

== Occurrences ==
The July 11 game between San Miguel and Red Bull at the Cuneta Astrodome had a bench-clearing incident in which 13 players of San Miguel and 11 from Red Bull were fined P10,000 by the Commissioner's office, the melee started during the third quarter when Beermen import Art Long threw a punch on Red Bull import Tony Lang, who retaliated with a shove, both imports were thrown out and when Lang was ushered out, he confronted the SMB import upon entering the locker room but was stopped by a female security officer.

Danny Seigle never played a single game for the Beermen in the season after his stint with the national training pool when he suffered a torn right Achilles tendon.

== Roster ==
2002 San Miguel Beermen roster
Players

Pos.	#	POB	Name	Height	Weight	DOB (YYYY–MM–DD)	From
G	1	(Philippines)	Emmanuel Victoria	5 ft 10 in (1.78 m)			San Beda
F	2	(Philippines)	Bryan Gahol (A)	6 ft 4 in (1.93 m)			Philippines
F	3	(United States)	Nic Belasco	6 ft 4 in (1.93 m)			Notre Dame (OH)
C	4	(United States)	Dorian Peña	6 ft 6 in (1.98 m)			Coppin State
C	5	(Philippines)	Ronilo Padilla	6 ft 5 in (1.96 m)			Cebu
F	7	(Philippines)	Michael Mustre	6 ft 1 in (1.85 m)			Letran
F/C	10	(Philippines)	Danny Ildefonso	6 ft 6 in (1.98 m)			National-U
F	15	(Philippines)	Dwight Lago	6 ft 3 in (1.91 m)			De La Salle
G	17	(Philippines)	Olsen Racela	5 ft 10 in (1.78 m)			Ateneo
G	21	(Philippines)	Joey Mente	5 ft 10 in (1.78 m)			Lyceum
F/C	22	(Philippines)	Arnold Gamboa	6 ft 6 in (1.98 m)			Far Eastern
G	31	(Philippines)	Alvin Castro	6 ft 3 in (1.91 m)			De La Salle
G	34	(Philippines)	Dondon Hontiveros	6 ft 2 in (1.88 m)			Cebu
F/C	44	(Philippines)	June Carmona	6 ft 6 in (1.98 m)			UPHSD
G	6 & 42	(United States)	Lamont Strothers (G)	6 ft 2 in (1.88 m)			Christopher Newport
F	40	(United States)	Mario Bennett (G)	6 ft 6 in (1.98 m)			Arizona State
F/C	26	(United States)	Keith Hill (G)	6 ft 9 in (2.06 m)			Shippensburg
C	30	(United States)	Jermaine Tate (C)	6 ft 9 in (2.06 m)			Cincinnati
G/F	23	(United States)	Damon Flint (C)	6 ft 5 in (1.96 m)			Cincinnati
G/F	32	(United States)	Shea Seals (C)	6 ft 5 in (1.96 m)			Tulsa
F/C	00	(United States)	Art Long (C)	6 ft 9 in (2.06 m)			Cincinnati
F	40	(United States)	Terquin Mott (C)	6 ft 8 in (2.03 m)			Coppin State
F	32	(United States)	Robert Duat (Traded)	6 ft 4 in (1.93 m)			Menlo

Coaches
Head coach
- (Philippines) Jong Uichico
Assistant(s)
- (Philippines) Siot Tanquingcen
- (Philippines) Arturo dela Cruz

Legend
- (DP) Unsigned draft pick
- (FA) Free agent
- (S) Suspended
- (G) Governor's Cup import
- (C) Commissioner's Cup import
- (A) Acquired via trade
- Injured

== Eliminations (Won games) ==
Date	Opponent	Score	Venue (Location)
March 5	FedEx	79–75	Philsports Arena
March 10	Shell	76–72	Ynares Center
March 22	Red Bull	89–67	(Lipa City, Batangas)
March 31	Brgy.Ginebra	74–56	Araneta Coliseum
April 16	RP-Hapee	76–67	Philsports Arena
June 29	Coca Cola	83–75	Cuneta Astrodome
July 5	Purefoods	81–58	(Iloilo City)
July 16	Brgy.Ginebra	93–82	Cuneta Astrodome
July 26	Shell	93–70	Ynares Center
July 28	FedEx	85–73	Araneta Coliseum
August 3	Talk 'N Text	84–72	Cuneta Astrodome
October 20	FedEx	94–71	Araneta Coliseum
November 3	Alaska	64–63	Araneta Coliseum
November 17	Purefoods	81–66	Araneta Coliseum
November 22	Talk 'N Text	82–79 OT	Philsports Arena
November 24	Coca Cola	94–86 2OT	Araneta Coliseum
November 30	Shell	62–54	Ynares Center

Governor's Cup
Commissioner's Cup
All-Filipino Cup
