= List of Philippine Basketball League champions =

The Philippine Basketball League awards a championship trophy (or cup) to the winning team at the end of each tournament.

== Champions by season ==
Years	Date	Conference	Champion	Runner-up
1983	May 6-June 6	Dry-Run Cup	De La Salle Green Archers	Maisagana
1983	October-December 9	Founder's Cup	Arellano Flaming Arrows	Bank of Rizal
1984	January 29-April 13	Ambassador's Cup	Bank of Rizal	Masagana 99
1984	June 30-October 10	President's Cup	ESQ Marketing	Masagana 99
1984	November 10-December 26	Invitationals	ESQ Marketing	Rizal Provincial Athletic Club
1985	April 14-June 7	Invitationals	ESQ Marketing	Lagerlite Beer
1985	October 5-December 2	Challenge to Champions	Army Jungle Fighters	Mama's Love
1986	May 3-July 12	Invitational Cup	Lhuillier Jewelers	Hope Cigarettes
1986	August-September 8	Founder's Cup	Magnolia Ice Cream	ESQ Marketing
1986	October 18-December 17	Filipino Cup	YCO Shine Masters	ESQ-Sta.Lucia
1987	March 7-April 4	International Invitational Cup	RFM-Swift's	YCO Shine Masters
1987	May-July 10	Freedom Cup	YCO Shine Masters	RFM-Swifts
1987	August 3-10	Philippine Cup	Swift-USA All Stars*	PABL-Philips (RP Team)
1987	October 10-December 18	Maharlika Cup	Magnolia Ice Cream	RFM-Swifts
1988	March 19-May 7	International Invitational Cup	RFM-Swift's	Philips Sardines
1988	May-June 29	Freedom Cup	Magnolia Ice Cream	Sta.Lucia Realtors
1988	October 15-December 22	Maharlika Cup	Philips Sardines	Magnolia Ice Cream
1989	March 26-May 19	Invitational Cup	Magnolia Ice Cream	Sta.Lucia Realtors
1989	June-July 13	Freedom Cup	Swift Squeeze Juice Drinks	Sta.Lucia Realtors
1989	October-December	Maharlika Cup	Magnolia Ice Cream	Sta.Lucia Realtors
1990	March 31-May 22	Maharlika Cup	Magnolia Ice Cream	Philips Sardines
1990	May 27-July 11	Challenge Cup	Crispa 400	Philips Sardines
1990	October-December 19	Philippine Cup	Sta. Lucia Realtors	Burger City
1991	February 9-April 27	Maharlika Cup	Crispa 400	Mama's Love
1991	May 18-July 24	Challenge Cup	Triple-V Foodmasters	Crispa 400
1991-92	December 7-February 17	Philippine Cup	Triple-V Foodmasters	Sta.Lucia Realtors
1991-92	April-July 11	Maharlika Cup	Sta. Lucia Realtors	Triple-V Restaurant
1991-92	October 24-December 19	Invitational Cup	Triple-V Foodmasters	Sta.Lucia Realtors
1993	March 27-June 8	Maharlika Cup	Nikon Home Appliances	Burger Machine
1993	October 16-December 22	President Fidel V. Ramos Cup	Burger Machine	Instafood
1994	February 13-March 26	International Invitational Cup	Casino Rubbing Alcohol	Nikon Electric Fan
1994	April 30-July 2	Reinforced Conference	Otto Shoes	Burger Machine
1994	October 15-December 19	Invitational Cup	Instafood Mealmasters	Otto Shoes
1995-96	March 4-May 10	Reinforced Conference	Stag Pale Pilseners	Red Bull Energy Drink
1995-96	May 20-July 8	All-Filipino Cup	Stag Pale Pilseners	Casino Rubbing Alcohol
1995-96	October 23-January 9	Danny Floro Cup	Stag Pale Pilseners	Red Bull Energy Drink
1996	March 16-May 8	Import Reinforced	Hapee Toothpaste	Stag Pale Pilseners
1996	June 14-July 12	All-Filipino Cup	Agfa HDC Films	Stag Pale Pilseners
1996	October 16-December 14	Danny Floro Cup	Stag Pale Pilseners	Springmaid
1997-98	March 8-June 5	Makati Mayor's Cup	Tanduay Gold Rhum	Dazz Dishwashing Paste
1997-98	October 25-January 17	All-Filipino Cup	Tanduay Gold Rhum	Agfa HDC Films
1998-99	April 18-July 6	1st Yakult-Centennial Cup	Tanduay Centennial Rhum	Batang Red Bull
1998-99	October 17-January 21	2nd Yakult-Centennial Cup	Dr. J Rubbing Alcohol	Tanduay Gold Rhum
1999-00	March 13-July 1	1st Yakult-Challenge Cup	Welcoat House Paints	Red Bull Energy Drink
1999-00	October 23-January 31	2nd Yakult-Challenge Cup	Welcoat House Paints	ANA Water Dispenser
2000-01	March 25-June 27	Chairman's Cup	Welcoat House Paints	Shark Energy Drink
2000-01	November 4-February 17	Challenge Cup	Shark Energy Drink	Welcoat Paints
2000-01	March 24-June 21	Alaxan-Chairman's Cup	Welcoat House Paints	Shark Energy Drink
2001-02	November 3-February 7	Alaxan-Challenge Cup	Shark Energy Drink	Welcoat Paints
2001-02	April 3-June 24	Chairman's Cup	Hapee-Nenaco-Ateneo de Manila Blue Eagles	Blu Sun Power
2002-03	November 4-January 27	Challenge Cup	Welcoat Paint Masters	Dazz Dishwashing
2002-03	March 23-June 19	Sunkist-Unity Cup	Hapee Toothpaste	Viva Mineral Water
2003-04	November 8-February 7	Platinum Cup	Fash Liquid Detergent	Welcoat Paints
2003-04	March 28-June 19	Unity Cup	Viva Mineral Water-FEU	Welcoat Paints
2004-05	October 23-February 10	Open Championships	Montaña Pawnshop Jewels	Welcoat Paints
2004-05	April 5-June 16	Unity Cup	Welcoat Paint Masters	Montaña Pawnshop
2005-06	October 29-February 16	Heroes Cup	Magnolia Ice Cream Wizards	Rain or Shine
2005-06	March 25-June 17	Unity Cup	Harbour Centre Port Masters	Toyota-Otis Sparks
2006-07	November 11-February 17	Silver Cup	Harbour Centre Port Masters	Hapee Toothpaste
2006-07	April 17-June 14	Unity Cup	Harbour Centre Batang Pier	Cebuana Lhuillier
2007-08	October 20-December 30	V-Go Extreme Energy Drink Cup	Harbour Centre Batang Pier	Hapee Toothpaste
2007-08	February 23-May 28	Lipovitan Amino Sports Drink Cup	Harbour Centre Batang Pier	Hapee Toothpaste
2008-09	November 8-February 10	PG Flex Linoleum Cup	Harbour Centre Batang Pier	Magnolia Purewater
2008-09	April 14-June 4	PG Flex Unity Cup	Oracle Residences	Pharex Generix
2010	February 16-March 27	PG Flex-Erase Placenta Open Cup	Excel Roof 25ers	Pharex B-Complex

== Champions by franchise ==
Franchise	Championships	Last championship
Magnolia Ice Cream / Instafood	7	1994 Invitational Cup
Stag Pale Pilsen / Tanduay Gold Rhum Masters	7	1998 First Centennial Cup
Harbour Centre Batang Pier / Oracle Residences	7	2009 Unity Cup
Welcoat Paintmasters	6	2005 Unity Cup
ESQ Marketing	3	1985 Invitationals
RFM-Swift Hotdogs	3	1989 Freedom Cup
Triple-V Foodmasters	3	1992 Invitational Cup
Sta. Lucia Realtors / Otto Shoes	3	1994 Reinforced Conference
Hapee Toothpaste / Fash Liquid Detergent	3	2003-04 Platinum Cup
YCO Shine Masters	2	1987 Freedom Cup
Crispa 400	2	1991 Maharlika Cup
Shark Energy Drink	2	2001-02 Challenge Cup
Viva Mineral Water-FEU / Magnolia Ice Cream-FEU	2	2005-06 Heroes Cup
De La Salle University	1	PABL's first tournament
Arellano University	1	1983 Founder's Cup
Development Bank of Rizal	1	1984 Ambassador's Cup
Army Jungle Fighters	1	1985 Challenge to Champions
Lhuillier Jewelers	1	1986 Invitational Cup
Philips Sardines	1	1988 Maharlika Cup
Nikon Home Appliances	1	1993 Maharlika Cup
Burger Machine	1	1993 President Ramos Cup
Casino Rubbing Alcohol	1	1994 International Invitational Cup
Agfa HDC Films	1	1996 All-Filipino Cup
Doctor J Rubbing Alcohol	1	1998-99 Second Centennial Cup
Ateneo-Hapee-NENACO	1	2002 Chairman's Cup
Montaña Pawnshop	1	2004-05 Open Championship
Excel Roof	1	2010 Placenta Open Cup

Notes:

- The original Magnolia franchise disbanded after the 1995-96 season. The second incarnation of Magnolia thru Viva Mineral Water, which joined the league in 2003, won two championships under coach Koy Banal. Their title victory in 2004 was referred as "first".
- For some reason, the Otto Shoes ballclub's roots was traced to Sta.Lucia, but the Realtors was considered a different team from the ESQ Merchants, whom they completely took over at the start of the 1987 PABL season.
- Ateneo-Hapee's title victory was not counted to that of Hapee Toothpaste' three championships.

== Most Valuable Players ==
Year	Name
1983: League's dry-run	Ludovico Valenciano (La Salle)
1983 Founder's Cup	Manuel Marquez (Bank of Rizal)
1984 Ambassador's Cup	Leo Austria (Masagana 99)
1984 President's Cup	Sonny Cabatu (ESQ)
1984 Invitationals	Sonny Cabatu (ESQ)
1985 Invitationals	Jojo Lastimosa (Mama's Love)
1985 Challenge to Champions	Jerry Codinera (UE)
1987 Season MVP	Alvin Patrimonio (Swift)
1988 International Cup	Benjie Paras (Philips)
1988 Maharlika Cup	Benjie Paras (Philips)
1989 Maharlika Cup	Peter Jao (Sta. Lucia)
1990 Maharlika Cup	Jun Limpot (Magnolia)
1990 Challenge Cup	Johnny Abarrientos (Crispa)
1990 Philippine Cup	Eugene Quilban (Sta. Lucia)
1991 Maharlika Cup	Stevenson Solomon (Mama's Love)
1991 Challenge Cup	Johnny Abarrientos (Crispa)
1991-92 Philippine Cup	Marlou Aquino (Sta. Lucia)
1992 Maharlika Cup	Jun Limpot (Magnolia)
1992 Invitational Cup	Johnny Abarrientos (Triple V)
1993 Maharlika Cup	Rey Evangelista (Nikon)
1993 Pres. Fidel V. Ramos Cup	Dennis Espino (Instafood)
1994 International Invitational	Jeffrey Cariaso (Nikon)
1994 Import Reinforced	Marlou Aquino (Otto)
1994 Invitational	Dennis Espino (Instafood)
1995 Import Reinforced	Marlou Aquino (Stag)
1995 All-Filipino Cup	Marlou Aquino (Stag)
1995-96 Danny Floro Cup	Marlou Aquino (Stag)
1996 Import Reinforced	Jason Webb (Stag)
1996 All-Filipino Cup	Bong Marata (Super Power Battery)
1996 Danny Floro Cup	Genesis Sasuman (Chowking)
1997 Makati Mayor's Cup	Rommel Adducul (Chowking)
1997-98 All Filipino Cup	Eric Menk (Tanduay)
1998 Yakult-Centennial Cup	Eric Menk (Tanduay)
1998-99 2nd Yakult-Centennial Cup	Eric Menk (Tanduay)
1999 Yakult-Challenge Cup	Don Allado (Welcoat)
1999-2000 2nd Yakult-Challenge Cup	Paolo Mendoza (Ana Water Dispenser)
2000 Chairman's Cup	Roger Yap (Shark Energy)
2000-01 Challenge Cup	Ren-Ren Ritualo (Welcoat)
2001 Alaxan-Chairman's Cup	Chester Tolomia (Shark Energy)
2001-02 Alaxan-Challenge Cup	Yancy de Ocampo (Welcoat)
2002 Chairman's Cup	Enrico Villanueva (Hapee-Nenaco-Ateneo)
2002-03 Challenge Cup	Rommel Adducul (Welcoat)
2003 Sunkist-Unity Cup	Gary David (Montaña)
2003-04 Platinum Cup	Peter June Simon (Fash Liquid Detergent)
2004 Unity Cup	Arwind Santos (Viva Mineral Water)
2004-05 Open Championship	Jondan Salvador (Montaña)
2005 Unity Cup	Mark Cardona (Harbour Centre)
2005-06 Heroes Cup	Jojo Tangkay (Rain or Shine)
2006 Unity Cup	Joe Devance (Toyota Otis)
2006-07 Silver Cup	Jayson Castro (Hapee Toothpaste-PCU)
2007 Unity Cup	Jayson Castro (Harbour Centre)
2007 V-Go Extreme Energy Drink Cup	No MVP*
2008 Lipovitan Amino Sports Drink Cup	No MVP*

- No MVP was awarded during this conference only a Finals MVP for this conference. League started to name season MVP in the 2007-08 season. In 2008-09 season, the league handed out awards for the Best Player of the Conference, similar to the Philippine Basketball Association.

=== Season Most Valuable Players ===
Year	Name
2007-08	Jayson Castro (Harbour Centre)
2008-09	Chris Ross (Pharex Bidang Generix)

=== Best Player of the Conference ===
2008-09 PG Flex Linoleum Cup	Paul Lee (Bacchus Energy Drink)
2009 PG Flex Unity Cup	Chris Ross (Pharex Bidang Generix)
2010 PG Flex-Erase Placenta Cup	Vic Manuel (Pharex B-Complex)

== Finals Most Valuable Players ==
Year	Name
2000 Chairman's Cup	Ren-Ren Ritualo (Welcoat)
2000-01 Challenge Cup	Roger Yap (Shark)
2001 Alaxan-Chairman's Cup	Jojo Manalo (Welcoat)
2001-02 Alaxan-Challenge Cup	Warren Ybañez (Shark)
2002 Chairman's Cup	Enrico Villanueva (Ateneo-Hapee-Nenaco)
2002-03 Challenge Cup	Rommel Adducul (Welcoat) / Ronald Tubid (Welcoat)
2003 Sunkist-Unity Cup	Allan Salangsang (Hapee Toothpaste)
2003-04 Platinum Cup	Peter June Simon (Fash)
2004 Unity Cup	Warren Ybañez (Viva Mineral Water-FEU)
2004-05 Open Championships	Alex Compton (Montaña)
2005 Unity Cup	Jay Washington (Welcoat)
2005-06 Heroes Cup	Kelly Williams (Magnolia Ice Cream)
2006 Unity Cup	LA Tenorio (Harbour Centre)
2006-07 Silver Cup	Chico Lanete (Harbour Centre)
2007 Unity Cup	Chico Lanete (Harbour Centre)
2007 V-Go Extreme Energy Drink Cup	Tyrone Tang (Harbour Centre)
2008 Lipovitan Amino Sports Drink Cup	Jayson Castro (Harbour Centre)
2008-09 PG Flex Linoleum Cup	Mark Barroca (Harbour Centre)
2009 PG Flex Unity Cup	Chris Timberlake (Oracle Residences)
2010 PG Flex-Erase Placenta Cup	Calvin Abueva (Excel Roof 25ers)

== Champions by coach ==
Coach	Championships	Champion teams handled
Derrick Pumaren	9	Magnolia Ice Cream, Triple-V
Alfrancis Chua	7	Stag Pale Pilsen / Tanduay Gold Rhum Masters
Junel Baculi	7	Welcoat Paints, Hapee Toothpaste
Jorge Gallent	6	Harbour Centre
Leo Austria	3	Shark Energy Drink, Welcoat Paints
Joe Lipa	3	ESQ Marketing, Philips Sardines
Egay Gomez	2	YCO Shine Masters
Yeng Guiao	2	RFM-Swift Hotdogs
Francis Rodriguez	2	Sta. Lucia Realtors, Instafood
Adonis Tierra	2	Sta. Lucia Realtors, Otto Shoes
Koy Banal	2	Viva Mineral Water-FEU / Magnolia Ice Cream-FEU

PABL / PBL coaches with one championship:

- Ron Jacobs (De La Salle)
- Loreto Carbonell (Arellano University)
- Nemie Villegas (Bank of Rizal)
- Chuck Barreiro (ESQ)
- Carlos Badion (Army)
- Alfredo Enriquez (Lhuillier)
- Arturo Valenzona (Swift)
- Fortunato Co, Jr (Crispa)
- Bogs Adornado (Crispa)
- Orly Castelo (Nikon)
- Perry Ronquillo (Burger Machine)
- Willie Generalao (Casino)
- Jimmy Mariano (Agfa)
- Leo Isaac (Doctor J Rubbing Alcohol)
- Joel Banal (Ateneo-Hapee-Nenaco)
- Robert Sison (Montaña)
- Caloy Garcia (Welcoat)
- Glenn Capacio (Oracle)
- Ato Agustin (Excel Roof)
