= 2006–07 Philippine Basketball League season =

2006–07 PBL season
- Duration: November 11, 2006 – June 14, 2007
- Teams: 9
- TV partner: ABS-CBN Sports (Studio 23)
- Season MVP: Jayson Castro; Jayson Castro
- Silver Cup champions: Harbour Centre Batang Pier
- Silver Cup runners-up: Hapee-PCU Teethmasters
- Unity Cup champions: Harbour Centre Batang Pier
- Unity Cup runners-up: Cebuana Lhuillier-Pera Padala

Seasons
- ← 2005-06 2007-08 →

The 2006–07 season of the Philippine Basketball League (PBL).

== 2006-07 Silver Cup ==
Team Standings	Win	Loss	Coach
Harbour Centre Portmasters	7	3	Jorge Gallent
Hapee-PCU Teethmasters	7	3	Jun Noel
Mail and More Comets	7	3	Lawrence Chongson
Toyota-Otis Sparks	7	3	Louie Alas
Henkel-Sista Super Sealers	6	4	Caloy Garcia
Cebuana Lhuillier-Pera Padala	4	6	Luigi Trillo
Teletech Titans	4	6	Jerry Codiñera
Magnolia Ice Cream Spinners	3	7	Koy Banal
Kettle Korn-UST	0	10	Pido Jarencio

=== Hapee-PCU vs Mail and More (Best-of-five semis) ===
February 1

Hapee-PCU 81, Mail and More Comets 67

Emilio Aguinaldo College Gym, Manila

February 3

Hapee-PCU 81, Mail and More Comets 65

The Arena in San Juan, San Juan City

February 6

Hapee-PCU 62, Mail and More Comets 78

Olivarez Sports Center, Parañaque

February 8

Hapee-PCU 88, Mail and More Comets 75
Hapee wins series, 3–1

Olivarez Sports Center, Parañaque

=== Harbour vs Toyota-Otis (Best-of-five semis) ===
February 1

Harbour Centre Batang Pier 77, Toyota-Otis Sparks 84

Emilio Aguinaldo College Gym, Manila

February 3

Harbour Centre Batang Pier 80, Toyota-Otis Sparks 74

The Arena in San Juan, San Juan City

February 6

Harbour Centre Batang Pier 60, Toyota-Otis Sparks 73

Olivarez Sports Center, Parañaque

February 8

Harbour Centre Batang Pier 86, Toyota-Otis Sparks 83

Olivarez Sports Center, Parañaque

February 10

Harbour Centre Batang Pier 92, Toyota-Otis Sparks 81
Harbour wins series, 3–2

Olivarez Sports Center, Parañaque

=== Silver Cup finals ===
February 13

Harbour Centre Batang Pier 84, Hapee-PCU 80

Olivarez Sports Center, Parañaque

February 15

Harbour Centre Batang Pier 63, Hapee-PCU 61

Emilio Aguinaldo College Gym, Manila

February 17

Harbour Centre Batang Pier 86, Hapee-PCU 73
Harbour wins series, 3–0

The Arena in San Juan, San Juan City

The Port Masters leaned on the red-hot shooting of Jonathan Fernandez, who finished with 23 points as he fueled Harbour's two decisive breakaways - the last one in the final six minutes where he clustered two straight triples that finally took the fight out of the Teeth Masters, 69-51. Chico Lanete, the hero in Games 1 and 3, provided the needed firepower while Al Vergara created the plays for the team.

=== Silver Cup Awards ===
- Most Valuable Player: Jayson Castro (Hapee)
- Finals MVP: Chico Lanete (Harbour)
- Fantastic Freshman Award: Mark Borboran (Hapee)
- Heart of a Champion Award: Marvin Cruz (Toyota-Otis)
- Defensive Stopper Award: Elmer Espiritu (Mail & More)
- Quantum Leap Award: Patrick Cabahug (Toyota-Otis)
- Instant Impact Award: Bonbon Custodio (Magnolia)
- Academic All-Star Award: JC Intal (Harbour) & Nestor David (Mail & More)
- Mythical First Team
  - Jayson Castro (Hapee)
  - Marvin Cruz (Toyota-Otis)
  - JR Quiñahan (Mail & More)
  - Larry Rodriguez (Hapee)
  - Dennis Daa (Toyota-Otis)
- Mythical Second Team
  - Mark Borboran (Hapee)
  - Patrick Cabahug (Toyota-Otis)
  - Chico Lanete (Harbour)
  - JC Intal (Harbour)
  - Kelvin Gregorio (Henkel Sista)

== 2007 Unity Cup ==
Team Standings	Win	Loss
Cebuana Lhuillier-Pera Padala	10	2
Harbour Centre Batang Pier	9	3
Henkel-Sista Super Sealers	6	6
Toyota-Balintawak Road Kings	5	7
Burger King Whoopers	5	7
San Miguel-Magnolia Beverage Masters	4	8
Dazz 'Sang Patak Kitchen Specialist	3	9

^{Note: Ariel Vanguardia replaces Louie Alas as Toyota coach}

=== Unity Cup Finals ===
June 9

Harbour Centre Batang Pier 84, Cebuana Lhuillier 78

The Arena in San Juan, San Juan City

June 12

Harbour Centre Batang Pier 90, Cebuana Lhuillier 75

Olivarez Sports Center, Parañaque

June 14

Harbour Centre Batang Pier 90, Cebuana Lhuillier 75
Harbour wins series, 3-0

Olivarez Sports Center, Parañaque

After being held to a close game in the first three quarters, Jayson Castro and JC Intal combined to lead a fiery breakaway that saw Harbour took a 75-60 lead with 5:58 remaining. Castro and Chico Lanete, the series' finals MVP, each scored 18 points, while Ryan Araña and JC Intal chipped in 15 markers apiece.

=== Unity Cup Awards ===
- Most Valuable Player: Jayson Castro (Harbour)
- Finals MVP: Chico Lanete (Harbour)
- Defensive Stopper Award: Josh Urbiztondo (Burger King)
- Quantum Leap Award: Lawrence Bonus (Henkel Sista)
- True Gentleman Award: Jonas Villanueva (Magnolia)
- Instant Impact Award: Mike Bravo (Burger King)
- Academic All-Star Award: Jonas Villanueva (Magnolia) & Kris Robles (Henkel Sista)
- Fantastic Freshman Award: Ryan Reyes (Henkel Sista)
- Mythical First Team
  - Jayson Castro (Harbour)
  - Ken Bono (Cebuana-Lhuillier)
  - Doug Kramer (Cebuana-Lhuillier)
  - Chico Lanete (Harbour)
  - Dennis Daa (Toyota-Balintawak)
- Mythical Second Team
  - Ronjay Buenafe (Burger King)
  - Macky Escalona (Cebuana-Lhuillier)
  - Chad Alonzo (Harbour)
  - Patrick Cabahug (Toyota-Balintawak)
  - JR Quiñahan (Burger King)
