= 2004–05 Philippine Basketball League season =

2004–05 PBL season
- Duration: October 23, 2004 – June 16, 2005
- Teams: 8
- TV partner: ABS-CBN Sports (Studio 23)
- Season MVP: Jondan Salvador; Mark Cardona
- Open Championship champions: Montaña Jewels
- Open Championship runners-up: Welcoat Paints
- Unity Cup champions: Welcoat Paints
- Unity Cup runners-up: Montaña Jewels

Seasons
- ← 2003-04 2005-06 →

The 2004–05 season of the Philippine Basketball League (PBL).

== 2004-05 Open Championships ==
Team Standings	Win	Loss	Head coach
Magnolia Ice Cream-FEU	11	3	Koy Banal
Montaña Jewels	10	4	Robert Sison
Granny Goose	9	5	Jun Tan
Welcoat Paints	7	7	Caloy Garcia
ICTSI-La Salle	6	8	Gee Abanilla / Franz Pumaren
Toyota Otis-Letran	6	8	Louie Alas
Addict Mobile-Ateneo	5	9	
Air Philippines	2	12	Lawrence Chongson

=== Montaña vs Granny Goose (Best-of-three semis) ===
January 22

Montaña Jewels 74, Granny Goose 66

UST Gym, España, Manila

January 25

boxscores

Montaña Jewels 67, Granny Goose 63
Montaña wins series, 2–0

Makati Coliseum, Makati

=== Magnolia vs Welcoat (Best-of-three semis) ===
January 22

Magnolia Ice Cream-FEU 61, Welcoat Paints 54

UST Gym, España, Manila

January 25

Magnolia Ice Cream-FEU 64, Welcoat Paints 69

Makati Coliseum, Makati

January 27

boxscores

Magnolia Ice Cream-FEU 61, Welcoat Paints 67
Welcoat wins series, 2–1

Makati Coliseum, Makati

=== Open finals ===
February 1

Montaña Jewels 65, Welcoat Paints 73

Makati Coliseum, Makati

February 3

Montaña Jewels 55, Welcoat Paints 48

Makati Coliseum, Makati

February 5

Montaña Jewels 77, Welcoat Paints 67

Makati Coliseum, Makati

February 8

Montaña Jewels 77, Welcoat Paints 80

Makati Coliseum, Makati

February 10

Montaña Jewels 79, Welcoat Paints 65
Montaña wins series, 3–2

Makati Coliseum, Makati

Montaña won their first-ever PBL title by blasting the Welcoat Paintmasters, 79-65, in the deciding fifth game of their series, the Jewels leaned on another shooting performance from finals MVP Alex Compton, who finish with a game-high 26 points, and also got gritty plays from veteran playmaker Froilan Baguion, who shot 13 points and pulled off three steals. Leo Najorda led Welcoat's charge with 20 points while Welcoat star Anthony Washington struggled offensively for the second straight game after stellar performances early in the finals series.

== Individual awards (Open) ==
- Most Valuable Player: Jondan Salvador (Montaña)
- Finals MVP: Alex Compton (Montaña)
- Fantastic Freshman Award: Jay Washington (Welcoat)
- Scoring Sensation Plum: Mark Cardona (ICTSI-La Salle)
- Defensive Stopper Award: JR Quiñahan (Granny Goose)
- Mr. Intangible: Eugene Tan (Welcoat)
- True Gentleman: Jenkins Mesina (Addict Mobile-Ateneo)
- Instant Impact: Al Vergara (Montaña)
- Mythical Five
  - Jondan Salvador (Montaña)
  - Jay Washington (Welcoat)
  - Arwind Santos (Magnolia)
  - JR Quiñahan (Granny Goose)
  - Mark Cardona (ICTSI-La Salle)
- Mythical Second Team
  - Warren Ybañez (Magnolia)
  - Denok Miranda (Magnolia)
  - Marvin Ortiguerra (Welcoat)
  - Al Magpayo (Montaña)
  - Ariel Capus (Montaña)

== 2005 Unity Cup ==
Team Standings	Win	Loss	Head coach
Montaña Pawnshop	9	2	Robert Sison
Harbour Centre	8	3	Tonichi Yturri
Welcoat Paints-St.Benilde	8	3	Caloy Garcia
Magnolia Ice Cream Wizards	6	5	Koy Banal
Toyota Otis-Letran	6	5	Louie Alas
Granny Goose Kornets	5	6	Jun Tan
Bacchus Energy Drink	2	9	
Negros Navigation-San Beda	0	11	Nash Racela

In a double-playoff game on May 24, Magnolia beat Toyota, 81–76, to clinch 4th-seed. Welcoat beat Harbour, 92–87, for 2nd-seed.

In the twice-to-beat advantage in the quarterfinal round on May 26, sixth-seeded Granny Goose forces a knockout game against third-seeded Harbour, 78–76. Magnolia advances in the final four, repeating over fifth-seeded Toyota-Otis, 66–53.

On May 28, Granny Goose eliminates Harbour with a 75–60 win.

=== Semifinal series ===
May 31

boxscores

Montaña Pawnshop 64, Granny Goose 58

JCSGO Gym, 15th Avenue, Cubao, Quezon City

May 31

Magnolia Ice Cream 75, Welcoat Paints 62

JCSGO Gym, 15th Avenue, Cubao, Quezon City

June 2

boxscores

Welcoat Paints 76, Magnolia Ice Cream 65

Pasig Sports Center, Pasig

June 2

Granny Goose 65, Montaña Pawnshop 61

Pasig Sports Center, Pasig

June 4

boxscores

Montaña Pawnshop 56, Granny Goose 54

JCSGO Gym, 15th Avenue, Cubao, Quezon City

June 4

Magnolia Ice Cream 80, Welcoat Paints 72

JCSGO Gym, 15th Avenue, Cubao, Quezon City

June 7

boxscores

Welcoat Paints 70, Magnolia Ice Cream 67

Pasig Sports Center, Pasig

Top-seeded teams' Montaña and Welcoat needed just two wins in the series to enter the finals while Magnolia and Granny Goose must win three games.

=== Unity Cup finals ===
June 9

Welcoat Paints 82, Montaña Pawnshop 80

Cuneta Astrodome, Pasay

June 11

Welcoat Paints 65, Montaña Pawnshop 62

Cuneta Astrodome, Pasay

June 14

Welcoat Paints 73, Montaña Pawnshop 89

Cuneta Astrodome, Pasay

June 16

Welcoat Paints 98, Montaña Pawnshop 80
Welcoat wins series, 3-1

Cuneta Astrodome, Pasay

After a string of runner-up finishes, Welcoat Paints collected the PBL Unity Cup championship with a 98-80 victory over Montaña in Game 4 for a 3-1 series victory. Finals MVP Jay Washington pumped in 25 points and grabbed 12 rebounds to lead the Paintmasters to their first title since 2002.

== Unity Cup awards ==
- Most Valuable Player: Mark Cardona (Harbour)
- Fantastic Freshman Award: Paolo Orbeta (Welcoat)
- Finals MVP: Jay Washington (Welcoat)
- Scoring Sensation Plum: Mark Cardona (Harbour)
- Defensive Stopper Award: Dennis Concha (Granny Goose)
- True Gentleman: Jay Coching (Welcoat)
- Instant Impact: Reed Juntilla (Montaña)
- Academic All-Star Award: Paolo Orbeta (Welcoat) & Raymond Dula (Toyota-Otis)
- Mythical Five
  - Mark Cardona (Harbour)
  - Jay Washington (Welcoat)
  - Arwind Santos (Magnolia)
  - JR Quiñahan (Granny Goose)
  - Jondan Salvador (Montaña)
- Mythical Second Team
  - LA Tenorio (Harbour)
  - Denok Miranda (Magnolia)
  - Leo Najorda (Welcoat)
  - Yousif Aljamal (Nenaco)
  - Froilan Baguion (Montaña)
