= 2005–06 Philippine Basketball League season =

2005–06 PBL season
- Duration: October 29, 2005 – June 17, 2006
- Teams: 8
- TV partner: ABS-CBN Sports (Studio 23)
- Top draft pick: Larry Rodriguez (PMI)
- Picked by: Montana Pawnshop
- Season MVP: Jojo Tangkay; Joe Devance
- Heroes Cup champions: Magnolia Ice Cream Wizards
- Heroes Cup runners-up: Rain or Shine
- Unity Cup champions: Harbour Centre
- Unity Cup runners-up: Toyota-Otis

Seasons
- ← 2004-05 2006-07 →

The 2005–06 season of the Philippine Basketball League (PBL).

== 2005-06 Heroes Cup ==
| Qualified for semifinals |
| Qualified for quarterfinals |

| # | Team Standings | W | L | PCT | GB |
|---|---|---|---|---|---|
| 1 | Rain or Shine | 8 | 3 | .727 | -- |
| 2 | Magnolia Dairy Ice Cream | 7 | 4 | .636 | 1 |
| 3 | Granny Goose | 6 | 5 | .545 | 2 |
| 4 | Harbour Centre | 6 | 5 | .545 | 2 |
| 5 | Hapee Toothpaste | 6 | 5 | .545 | 2 |
| 6 | Montana Pawnshop | 5 | 6 | .455 | 3 |
| 7 | Far Eastern Insurance | 3 | 8 | .273 | 5 |
| 8 | Toyota-Otis Sparks | 3 | 8 | .273 | 5 |

Magnolia and Rain or Shine makes it to the finals via two-game sweep in their best-of-three semifinal series against Granny Goose and Harbour respectively, the Wizards won over Tortillos, 98-97 in overtime in Game One and repeated with another double overtime win in the second game, 92-86. The Painters edged Harbour, 69-67, in their semifinals opener, and they wrapped up the series with a 69-59 triumph in Game Two.

=== Finals ===
Studio 23

February 2

recap

Magnolia Ice Cream 68, Rain or Shine 70 (OT)

San Andres Gym, Malate, Manila

Studio 23

February 5

recap

Magnolia Ice Cream 73, Rain or Shine 75

San Andres Gym, Malate, Manila

Studio 23

February 9

Magnolia Ice Cream 80, Rain or Shine 70

San Andres Gym, Malate, Manila

Studio 23

February 12

Magnolia Ice Cream 61, Rain or Shine 57

San Andres Gym, Malate, Manila

Studio 23

February 16

Magnolia Ice Cream 75, Rain or Shine 60
Magnolia wins series, 3–2

San Andres Gym, Malate, Manila

Magnolia overcame a 0-2 series deficit, the Wizards pulled away from a 56-all deadlock in the final three minutes of the deciding fifth game, a 9-0 run, with Arwind Santos hitting a triple, gave Magnolia a 65-56 advantage with 1:23 remaining, the Painters remain scoreless and allowed the Wizards to pad their lead to 16 points, 73-57. Kelly Williams of Magnolia was voted the finals MVP.

=== Individual awards ===
- Heroes Cup
- Most Valuable Player: Jojo Tangkay (Rain or Shine)
- Finals MVP: Kelly Williams (Magnolia)
- Defensive Stopper Award: Robb Reyes (Harbour Centre)
- Quantum Leap Award: JR Reyes (Rain or Shine)
- True Gentleman Award: Yousif Aljamal (Rain or Shine)
- Instant Impact Award: Jeff Chan (Magnolia)
- Academic All-Star Award: Toti Almeda (Granny Goose)
- Fantastic Freshman Award: Mark Moreno (Hapee-PCU)
- Mythical First Team:
- Jojo Tangkay (Rain or Shine)
- Jayson Castro (Hapee-PCU)
- Kelly Williams (Magnolia)
- Arwind Santos (Magnolia)
- JR Reyes (Rain or Shine)
- Mythical Second Team:
- Joseph Yeo (Harbour Centre)
- Robb Reyes (Harbour Centre)
- Joe Devance (Toyota-Otis)
- Gabby Espinas (Hapee-PCU)
- Robert Sanz (Hapee-PCU)

== 2006 Unity Cup ==
| Qualified for semifinals |
| Qualified for quarterfinals |

| # | Team Standings | W | L | PCT | GB |
|---|---|---|---|---|---|
| 1 | Toyota-Otis Sparks | 10 | 4 | .714 | -- |
| 2 | Montana Pawnshop Jewels | 10 | 4 | .714 | -- |
| 3 | Granny Goose | 8 | 6 | .571 | 2 |
| 4 | Rain or Shine | 8 | 6 | .571 | 2 |
| 5 | Magnolia Ice Cream Spinners | 6 | 8 | .429 | 4 |
| 6 | Harbour Centre | 6 | 8 | .429 | 4 |
| 7 | Hapee-PCU Teeth Sparkles | 4 | 10 | .285 | 6 |
| 8 | Teletech Titans | 4 | 10 | .285 | 6 |

Sixth-seeded Harbour advances to the finals with a 3-1 series win over Montaña. In the other semifinal series, Toyota-Otis scored a 3-0 sweep over defending champion Rain or Shine.

=== Finals ===
Studio 23

June 8

recap

Harbour Centre 51, Toyota-Otis Sparks 68

Olivarez Sports Center, Parañaque

Studio 23

June 10

recap

Harbour Centre 78, Toyota-Otis Sparks 63

Olivarez Sports Center, Parañaque

Studio 23

June 13

recap

Harbour Centre 80, Toyota-Otis Sparks 83

Olivarez Sports Center, Parañaque

Studio 23

June 15

recap

Harbour Centre 73, Toyota-Otis Sparks 55

Olivarez Sports Center, Parañaque

Studio 23

June 17

Harbour Centre 73, Toyota-Otis Sparks 66
Harbour Centre wins series, 3-2

Olivarez Sports Center, Parañaque

Joseph Yeo fired seven three-pointers and scored a game-high 28 points as Harbour captured its first PBL title. The Portmasters drilled in 36 points from the three-point area and five of those triples came in the opening of the fourth period that opened up a 68-57 lead against the Sparks heading into the final 4:50. LA Tenorio of Harbour Centre was awarded with the finals MVP.

=== Individual awards ===
- Unity Cup
- Most Valuable Player: Joe Devance (Toyota-Otis)
- Finals MVP: LA Tenorio (Harbour Centre)
- Defensive Stopper Award: Jireh Ibañes (Granny Goose)
- Quantum Leap Award: Ken Bono (Montaña)
- True Gentleman Award: JV Casion (Toyota-Otis)
- Instant Impact Award: Alfie Grijaldo (Granny Goose)
- Academic All-Star Award: LA Tenorio (Harbour Centre)
- Fantastic Freshman Award: Larry Rodriguez (Montaña)
- Mythical First Team:
- Jayson Castro (Hapee-PCU)
- J.R. Quiñahan (Granny Goose)
- Joe Devance (Toyota-Otis)
- Jojo Tangkay (Rain or Shine)
- Kelly Williams (Magnolia Ice Cream)
- Mythical Second Team:
- Arwind Santos (Magnolia Ice Cream)
- Marvin Ortiguerra (Rain or Shine)
- Alex Compton (Montana)
- Ken Bono (Montana)
- Al Magpayo (Montana)
