= Caloy Garcia =

Filipino basketball coach

Rain or Shine Elasto Painters
- Position: Assistant coach / Head of basketball operations
- League: PBA

Personal information
- Born: March 18, 1975 (age 51) Philippines

Career information
- College: Benilde
- Coaching career: 2002–present

Career history

Coaching
- 2002–2004: Welcoat/Rain or Shine (PBL) (assistant)
- 2004–2006: Welcoat/Rain or Shine (PBL)
- 2005–2007: Benilde
- 2006–2008: Welcoat Dragons (assistant)
- 2008–2010: Rain or Shine Elasto Painters
- 2010–2016: Rain or Shine Elasto Painters (assistant)
- 2013–2014: Letran
- 2016–2020: Rain or Shine Elasto Painters
- 2021–2022: Rain or Shine Elasto Painters (consultant)
- 2022–present: Rain or Shine Elasto Painters (assistant)
- 2023–present: De La Salle (assistant)

Career highlights
- As head coach: PBA All-Star Game head coach (2019); PBL champion (2005 Unity Cup); As assistant coach: 2× PBA champion (2011 Governors', 2016 Commissioner's); 2× PBA D-League champion (2023 Aspirants' Cup, 2024 Aspirants' Cup); AsiaBasket champion (2025 College Campus Tour); 2× UAAP champion (2023, 2025); PBL champion (2002-03 Challenge Cup)

Carlos Jose "Caloy" Garcia (born March 18, 1975) is a Filipino professional basketball coach and former TV host. He is an assistant coach for the Rain or Shine Elasto Painters of the Philippine Basketball Association (PBA) and the De La Salle Green Archers (UAAP).

== Early life ==
Caloy Garcia was born to a Spanish father who is from Málaga and a Filipino mother. He studied at De La Salle-College of Saint Benilde and briefly played for the Dazz Dishwashing Paste in the PBL. He is a cousin of San Miguel Beermen head coach Jorge Gallent, also a Benildean. He assisted Garcia in the De La Salle-College of Saint Benilde and the Welcoat Paintmasters prior to his winning run with the Harbour Centre Batang Pier.

He was one of the male hosts of Sunday noontime variety show, GMA Supershow.

== Coaching career ==
=== Welcoat assistant (PBL) ===
He assisted Leo Austria in the Welcoat Paintmasters from 2002 to 2004.

=== Welcoat/Rain or Shine ===
He was the head coach of the Welcoat Paintmasters from 2005 up to its last year in 2006. He even led them to a PBL title (Unity Cup) in 2005 defeating the Monataña Pawnshop, 3–1.

=== CSB Blazers coach ===
He was hired in 2005 to replace Tonichi Ytturi as head coach of the Benilde Blazers. Under him, he produced NCAA MVP Jay Sagad. Later, he led them to 5–9, 3–11, and 1–11 records respectively. He was later replaced by Gee Abanilla.

=== Welcoat assistant ===
He again assisted Leo Austria in the Welcoat Paintmasters from 2006 to 2008. Austria then resigned after the Philippine Cup.

=== Welcoat/Rain or Shine ===
He was hired as an interim coach of the Dragons and eventually the team's head coach in 2008. After being eliminated by the San Miguel Beermen during the quarterfinals of the 2010–11 Philippine Cup, Rain or Shine announced that Garcia will be replaced by Yeng Guiao as head coach. Garcia will slide down as the head assistant coach of the team.

=== Letran Knights ===
Upon the resignation of Louie Alas, Garcia was chosen to become the head coach of the Colegio de San Juan de Letran Knights. He will start coaching Letran during the 2013–2014 NCAA season. He led the Knights into the finals, when they lost to San Beda Red Lions.

=== La Salle assistant ===
In January 2023, Garcia was selected by Topex Robinson as his lead assistant coach for the De La Salle Green Archers in the University Athletic Association of the Philippines (UAAP). Under Robinson and Garcia, the Green Archers made their first UAAP finals appearance since 2017 and won the championship, ending a seven-year title drought.

== Personal life ==
He is a cousin of professional footballers and Philippine internationals Angel Guirado and Juan Luis Guirado. Garcia is also the uncle of actress Coleen Garcia.

== Coaching record ==
=== Collegiate record ===
Season	Team	GP	W	L	PCT	Finish	PG	W	L	PCT	Results
2005	CSB	14	5	9	.357	6th	—	—	—	—	Eliminated
2006	CSB	14	3	11	.214	8th	—	—	—	—	Eliminated
2007	CSB	12	1	11	.083	7th	—	—	—	—	Eliminated
2013	CSJL	18	14	4	.777	2nd	4	2	2	.500	Finals
2014	CSJL	18	9	9	.500	6th	—	—	—	—	Eliminated
Totals		76	32	44	.421		4	2	2	.500	0 championships

=== Professional record ===
Season	Team	Conference	Elimination round					Playoffs				
Season	Team	Conference	PG	W	L	PCT	Finish	PG	W	L	PCT	Results
2007–08	Welcoat	Fiesta	18	4	14	.222	10th	—	—	—	—	Eliminated
2008–09	Rain or Shine	Philippine Cup	18	10	8	.556	4th	2	0	2	.000	Quarterfinals
2008–09	Rain or Shine	Fiesta	14	8	6	.571	3rd	10	5	5	.500	Fourth place
2009–10	Rain or Shine	Philippine Cup	18	4	14	.222	9th	7	3	4	.428	Quarterfinals
2009–10	Rain or Shine	Fiesta	18	9	9	.500	6th	7	3	4	.428	Quarterfinals
2010–11	Rain or Shine	Philippine Cup	14	5	9	.357	8th	1	0	1	.000	Quarterfinals
2016–17	Rain or Shine	Philippine Cup	11	5	6	.455	8th	2	1	1	.500	Quarterfinals
2016–17	Rain or Shine	Commissioner's	11	5	6	.455	6th	2	0	2	.000	Quarterfinals
2016–17	Rain or Shine	Governors'	11	7	4	.636	4th	2	1	1	.500	Quarterfinals
2017–18	Rain or Shine	Philippine Cup	11	6	5	.545	8th	2	0	2	.000	Quarterfinals
2017–18	Rain or Shine	Commissioner's	11	9	2	.818	1st	6	2	4	.333	Semifinals
2017–18	Rain or Shine	Governors'	11	3	8	.273	10th	—	—	—	—	Eliminated
2019	Rain or Shine	Philippine Cup	11	8	3	.727	2nd	8	4	4	.500	Semifinals
2019	Rain or Shine	Commissioner's	11	5	6	.455	6th	7	3	4	.429	Semifinals
2019	Rain or Shine	Governors'	11	4	7	.364	9th	—	—	—	—	Eliminated
2020	Rain or Shine	Philippine Cup	11	6	5	.545	8th	1	0	1	.000	Quarterfinals
Totals			210	98	112	.466	Playoff totals	57	22	35	.386	0 championships

Preceded by Leo Austria	Welcoat/Rain or Shine head coach 2004-2006	Succeeded by final (moved to PBA)
Preceded by Tonichi Yturri	CSB Blazers seniors' basketball head coach 2005-2007	Succeeded by Gee Abanilla
Preceded by Leo Austria	Rain or Shine Elasto Painters head coach 2008-2010	Succeeded by Yeng Guiao
Preceded by Louie Alas	Letran Knights head coach 2013-2014	Succeeded by Aldin Ayo
Preceded by Yeng Guiao	Rain or Shine Elasto Painters head coach 2016-2020	Succeeded by Chris Gavina
