= 2003–04 Philippine Basketball League season =

2003–04 PBL season
- Duration: November 8, 2003 – June 19, 2004
- Teams: 8
- TV partner: ABS-CBN Sports (Studio 23)
- Season MVP: Peter June Simon; Arwind Santos
- Platinum Cup champions: Fash Liquid Detergent
- Platinum Cup runners-up: Welcoat Paints
- Unity Cup champions: Viva Mineral Water-FEU
- Unity Cup runners-up: Welcoat Paints

Seasons
- ← 2002-03 2004-05 →

The 2003–04 season of the Philippine Basketball League (PBL).

== New theme ==
The Philippine Basketball League (PBL), in partnership with the giant network ABS-CBN through Studio 23 and ABS-CBN Sports presentation of the league, adopted a new slogan "Ito ang tunay na ligang bayan".

== 2003-04 Platinum Cup ==
| Team Standings | Win | Loss | Head coach |
|---|---|---|---|
| Welcoat Paints | 9 | 3 | Leo Austria |
| Sunkist-UST | 8 | 4 | Aric del Rosario |
| Fash Liquid Detergent | 7 | 5 | Junel Baculi |
| Blu Star Detergent | 7 | 5 | Leo Isaac |
| Montaña Pawnshop | 5 | 7 | Bong Go |
| Viva Mineral Water-FEU | 4 | 8 | Koy Banal |
| ICTSI-La Salle | 2 | 10 | Franz Pumaren |

=== Finals ===
January 29

Fash Liquid Detergent 60, Welcoat Paints 78

Makati Coliseum, Makati

January 31

recap

Fash Liquid Detergent 84, Welcoat Paints 80 (2OT)

San Juan Gym, San Juan City

February 3

Fash Liquid Detergent 53, Welcoat Paints 60

Pasig Sports Center, Pasig

February 5

recap

Fash Liquid Detergent 72, Welcoat Paints 64

Pasig Sports Center, Pasig

February 7

Fash Liquid Detergent 61, Welcoat Paints 55
Fash wins series, 3-2

Philsports Arena, Pasig

Fash (formerly Hapee) leaned on a couple of three-pointers by Larry Fonacier in the last quarter of the deciding fifth game to down Welcoat Paints and clinch the championship. Fash coach Junel Baculi now match former Stag coach Alfrancis Chua as the winningest mentor in the PBL with seven titles.

=== Platinum Cup awards ===
- Most Valuable Player: Peter June Simon (Fash)
- Newcomer Award: Jemal Vizcarra (Sunkist-UST)
- Most Improved Award: Niño Gelig (Fash)
- Sudden Impact: Dondon Villamin (Sunkist-UST)
- Mythical Five
  - Peter June Simon (Fash)
  - Rich Alvarez (Fash)
  - James Yap (Welcoat)
  - Jercules Tangkay (Welcoat)
  - Ervin Sotto (Welcoat)
- Mythical Second Team
  - Alex Compton (Sunkist-UST)
  - Allan Salangsang (Fash)
  - Marc Pingris (Welcoat)
  - Paul Artadi (Welcoat)
  - Willy Wilson (Welcoat)

== 2004 Unity Cup ==
| Team Standings | Win | Loss | PCT |
|---|---|---|---|
| Viva Mineral Water-FEU | 9 | 1 | .900 |
| Welcoat Paints | 6 | 4 | .600 |
| Hapee Toothpaste | 5 | 5 | .500 |
| Toyota Otis-Letran | 4 | 6 | .400 |
| Montaña Pawnshop | 4 | 6 | .400 |
| Sunkist-UST | 4 | 6 | .400 |
| Blu Star Detergent | 4 | 6 | .400 |
| Lee Pipes-Ateneo | 4 | 6 | .400 |

=== Finals ===
June 12

Viva Mineral Water 59, Welcoat Paints 54 (OT)

Pasig Sports Center, Pasig

June 15

recap

Viva Mineral Water 35, Welcoat Paints 52

Pasig Sports Center, Pasig

June 17

recap

Viva Mineral Water 66, Welcoat Paints 64

Pasig Sports Center, Pasig

June 19

Viva Mineral Water 60, Welcoat Paints 55
Viva-FEU wins series, 3-1

Pasig Sports Center, Pasig

Viva Mineral Water-FEU wins their first championship since joining the league in this same conference last year, where they lost to Hapee after taking a 2-1 series lead in the finals. Welcoat threatened to extend the series by taking an eight-point lead, 43-35, midway in the third quarter, but the Water Force ended their scoring drought with eight unanswered points for a 43-all deadlock entering the final period.

=== Unity Cup Awards ===
- Most Valuable Player: Arwind Santos (Viva-FEU)
- Top Newcomer: Boyet Bautista (Toyota-Otis)
- Sudden Impact Award: Aaron Aban (Toyota-Otis)
- Sportsmanship Award: Chester Tolomia (Welcoat)
- Consistency Award: Eric Dela Cuesta (Blu Star)
- Most Improved Award: Ronjay Enrile (Toyota-Otis)
- Mythical First Team
  - Jercules Tangkay (Welcoat)
  - Chester Tolomia (Welcoat)
  - Arwind Santos (Viva-FEU)
  - Dennis Miranda (Viva-FEU)
  - Mark Isip (Viva-FEU)
- Mythical Second Team
  - Ronjay Enrile (Toyota-Otis)
  - Warren Ybañez (Viva-FEU)
  - Marvin Ortiguerra (Viva-FEU)
  - Jason Misolas (Nenaco)
  - Mark Macapagal (Hapee)

== Occurrences ==
PBL Commissioner Chino Trinidad resign unexpectedly at halftime of Game three of Fash-Welcoat finals series, Trinidad admitted his frustration and displeasure on a display of defiance by Welcoat players following the choice of Fash' Peter June Simon as MVP over Welcoat' Jercules Tangkay. Deputy commissioner Tommy Ong was named interim chief of the league.
