= Neil Rañeses =

Filipino basketball player

Personal information
- Born: March 1, 1981 (age 45) Cebu, Philippines
- Listed height: 6 ft 4 in (1.93 m)
- Listed weight: 190 lb (86 kg)

Career information
- College: UV
- PBA draft: 2005: 1st round, 11th overall pick
- Drafted by: Coca-Cola Tigers
- Playing career: 2005–2007
- Position: Small forward / power forward

Career history
- 2005–2007: Coca-Cola Tigers

Career highlights
- 3× CESAFI champion (2001–2003); CESAFI MVP (2002); PBL Mythical Second Team (2007–08 Season)

Neil Rañeses (born March 1, 1981, in Cebu, Philippines) is a Filipino former professional basketball player.

He previously played in the Philippine Basketball Association with the Coca-Cola Tigers, the same team that drafted him 11th overall in the 2005 PBA draft. He also had stints in the amateur Philippine Basketball League, the most recent being with the Magnolia Purewater Wizards.
