= Boyet Bautista =

Filipino basketball player

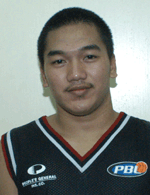

Personal information
- Born: April 22, 1981 (age 45) Pasay, Philippines
- Listed height: 5 ft 5 in (1.65 m)
- Listed weight: 160 lb (73 kg)

Career information
- High school: Letran (Manila)
- College: Letran
- PBA draft: 2006: 1st round9th overall
- Drafted by: Purefoods Chunkee Giants
- Playing career: 2006–2021
- Position: Point guard

Career history
- 2006: Toyota-Otis-Letran
- 2006: Harbour Centre Batang Pier
- 2006–07: Purefoods Chunkee Giants
- ?: Chang Thailand Slammers
- 2018–2019: Pasig Pirates
- 2021: Makati FSD Blazers

Boyet Bautista is a Filipino former professional basketball player. Bautista played high school and collegiate basketball for the Knights of the Colegio de San Juan de Letran. He had a stint with Toyota Otis-Letran in the Philippine Basketball League, and later with the Purefoods Tender Juicy Giants of the Philippine Basketball Association, before returning to the PBL.

== Amateur career ==
=== Letran Squires ===
Bautista joined the Letran Squires basketball team in 2000, forming a formidable lineup which made them a force to reckon in the NCAA Juniors division. Teaming up with then MVP Ronjay Enrile, Ira Buyco, Billy Ray Anabo, Mark Balneg and Wilbert Soriano the Squires swept the elimination round with a 14–0 record and give them an automatic trip to the Juniors finals with a twice-to-beat advantage. In the finals, they faced the (now inactive) Mapua Red Robins led by Jeff Martin and company. However, their dreams of a perfect season took a turn for the worse, as the Squires were beaten in the finals twice. Four of the team's starters, including Bautista, suffered cramps during the crucial stretches of the deciding Game 2.

=== Letran Knights ===
When Bautista graduated from high school, he stayed in Letran with the hope of leading the school to a championship in the NCAA Seniors division. He made it to the team in 2002 and, as the team's starting point guard, gave Letran two championships in 2003 and 2005.

=== Philippine Basketball League ===
When Toyota-Otis and Letran made a partnership to send the Knights in the PBL, he and superstar teammate Ronjay Enrile became founding stars of the team. In the 2006 PBL Unity Cup, he led Toyota to its first PBL championship appearance thanks to a solid supporting cast including then MVP, Joe Devance. The Knights lost to Harbour Centre Port Masters 3-2 led by very close friend LA Tenorio and Joseph Yeo.

== Professional career ==
=== Philippine Basketball Association ===
During the 2006 PBA Draft, he was drafted 9th overall by Purefoods.

=== RP Team ===
Boyet Bautista was also included in the National Team that won the Philippines a gold medal at the Southeast Asian Games in Thailand in December 2007.

=== UNTV Cup ===
Before he joined the UNTV Cup, Bautista was played in an invitational tourney in Jeddah, Saudi Arabia. In 2015, Bautista played for the AFP Cavaliers men's basketball team in the UNTV Cup Season 4. He was named as part of the Mythical Five selection. Bautista was one of the major contributors of the team where they moved up to the finals of Season 4 and later clinched the championship title beating PNP Responders in the three-game finals series. He was named as the Finals MVP.
