= Snak King =

Snack product manufacturer

- Type: Corporation
- Industry: Snack food manufacturer
- Founded: 1978
- Headquarters: City of Industry, CA, U.S.
- Key people: Barry C. Levin, Chairman/CEO
- Revenue: Undisclosed
- Number of employees: 950
- Website: snakking.com

Snak King is a privately owned snack food manufacturer founded in 1978, headquartered in Industry, California. Snak King manufactures potato chips, tortilla chips, nuts, popcorn and other snacks under private label as well its own proprietary brand names . The company is one of the largest manufacturers of snack foods in the United States, employing about 950 people and operating more than 600,000 square feet of manufacturing and warehouse space.

In December 2011, Snak King acquired C.J. Vitner Company, a Chicago based manufacturer and distributor of snack foods.

== History ==
Snak King was established in 1978 by three investor groups—a pork rind manufacturer, a distributor and a manufacturing facility. One of the investors at the time was Mike Levin, father of the current chairman and chief executive officer, Barry Levin. Barry Levin joined the company in 1979 and shortly thereafter purchased a one-third interest in the company. He purchased the remaining two-thirds over the next five years.

In 1982, Snak King moved from its original 1200-square-foot facility in downtown Los Angeles to a 50,000-square-foot facility. That year, the company introduced its El Sabroso brand. In 1984, it added popcorn and caramel corn, then expanded into cheese puffs and cheese curls. In 1994, the company relocated to Industry, California. In 2000, Snak King acquired the corn chip, popcorn and extruded snack lines of the West Coast-based Granny Goose snack label.

In October 2004, rainfall triggered a massive roof collapse at its manufacturing and distribution facility, which took the company three years to rebuild at a cost of more than $30 million.

Its acquisition of Vitner's in 2011 nearly doubled Snak King's work force and floor space. Founded in 1926, Vitner's produces potato chips, tortilla chips, extruded puffs and curls, and other snack foods under its own brand name as well as private labels. Vitner's distributes to more than 20 states from its distribution centers in Chicago and Elk Grove Village, Illinois, and Merrillville, Indiana.

== Brands ==
- El Sabroso
- Granny Goose
- Jensen's Orchard
- Nutibles
- The Whole Earth

== Awards ==
In 2006, Snak King received the ”Excellence in Business-Manufacturing” award from the Los Angeles Business Journal as well as the Snack Manufacturer of the Year award from Snack Food & Wholesale Bakery.

In 2007, Barry Levin was honored by Ernst & Young as the “Entrepreneur of the Year”.

In 2008, the executive team at Snak King received Snack Food & Wholesale Bakery's Executives of the Year award.

In 2011, Levin received the California State Small Business Person of the Year award and was one of 18 Small Business “Champions of Change” who met with representatives of the White House Administration.

In 2013, Snak King received the Business of the Year Award from the San Gabriel Valley Economic Partnership.
