= Arwind Santos =

Filipino basketball player (born 1981)

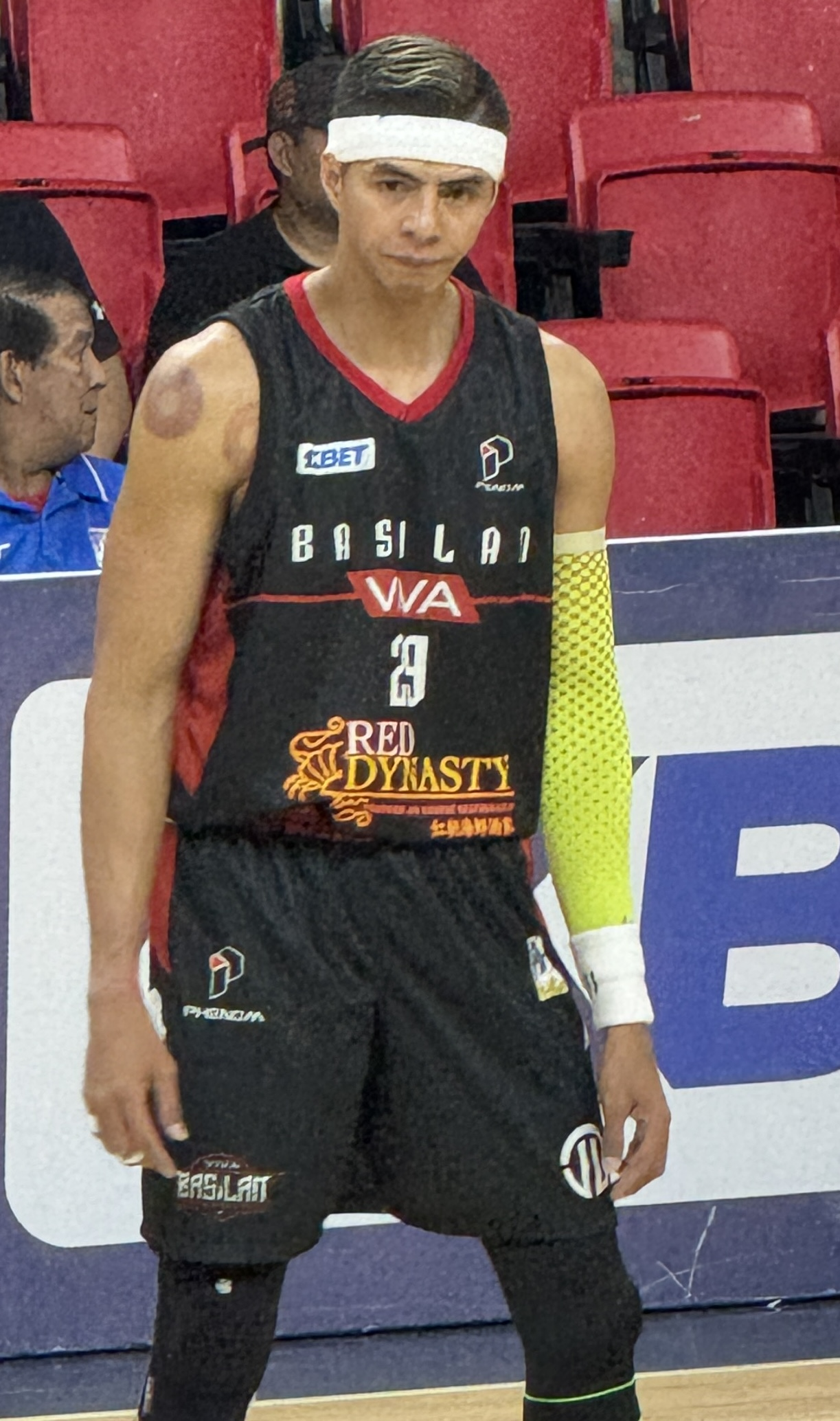
- Santos with the Basilan Viva Portmasters in 2025

Personal information
- Born: June 10, 1981 (age 45) Angeles City, Philippines
- Listed height: 6 ft 4 in (1.93 m)
- Listed weight: 175 lb (79 kg)

Career information
- High school: Lubao Institute (Lubao, Pampanga)
- College: FEU
- PBA draft: 2006: 1st round, 2nd overall pick
- Drafted by: Air21 Express
- Playing career: 2006–present
- Position: Power forward / small forward
- Coaching career: 2017–2017

Career history

Playing
- 2006–2009: Air21 Express / Burger King Titans/Whoppers
- 2009–2021: Petron Blaze Boosters / San Miguel Beermen
- 2021–2023: NorthPort Batang Pier
- 2023–2025: Pampanga Giant Lanterns
- 2025: Basilan Viva Portmasters/Starhorse

Coaching
- 2017: FEU (assistant)

Career highlights
- 9× PBA champion (2011 Governors', 2014–15 Philippine, 2015 Governors', 2015–16 Philippine, 2016–17 Philippine, 2017 Commissioner's, 2017–18 Philippine, 2019 Philippine, 2019 Commissioner's); 2× PBA Finals MVP (2011 Governors', 2014–15 Philippine); PBA Most Valuable Player (2013); 2× PBA Best Player of the Conference (2011 Governors', 2013 Governors'); 12× PBA All-Star (2008–2015, 2017–2019, 2023); 2× PBA All-Star Game MVP (2013, 2019); 10× PBA Mythical First Team (2008–2013, 2015–2017, 2021); 2× PBA Mythical Second Team (2007, 2018); 3x PBA Defensive Player of the Year (2008, 2011, 2021); 8× PBA All-Defensive Team (2007–2013, 2021); PBA All-Rookie Team (2007); PBA Order of Merit (2009); PBA Blitz Game MVP (2007); 50 Greatest Players in PBA History (2015 selection); PBA 10,000 Point Club; No. 29 retired by the San Miguel Beermen; MPBL champion (2023); 2x PBL champion (2004 Unity, 2005-06 Heroes); PBL Most Valuable Player (2004 Unity); 4x PBL Mythical First Team (2004 Unity, 2004-05 Open Championship, 2005 Unity, 2005-06 Heroes); PBL Mythical Second Team (2006 Unity); CLRAA champion; 3× UAAP champion (2003–2005); 2× UAAP Most Valuable Player (2004, 2005); 2× UAAP Finals Most Valuable Player (2003, 2005); 3× UAAP Mythical First Team (2003–2005); 2× UAAP Defensive Player of the Year (2004, 2005); UAAP Rookie of the Year (2002); No. 19 retired by the FEU Tamaraws

Arwind Anaya Santos (Tagalog: [ˈsantos]; born June 10, 1981) is a Filipino professional basketball player who last played for the Basilan Starhorse of the Maharlika Pilipinas Basketball League (MPBL).

== Amateur career ==
=== High school career ===
Born in Angeles City, Philippines, Santos played for Lubao Institute during his high school career and won the West Central Zone Championship. In 2000, he became well known during zonal competitions because of his hard work on the basketball court. He was then included in the line up of RQP (Rodolfo Q. Pineda) Team, a local ball club in Lubao under the supervision of Dennis 'Delta' Pineda, who is also a supporter of San Sebastian College-Recoletos Stags and the one responsible for landing the Pinatubo Trio composed of Calvin Abueva, Ronald Pascual and Ian Sangalang in the NCAA. Pineda helped him in college and landed him a spot in the FEU Tamaraws men's basketball team.

=== College career ===
Santos arrived at the UAAP scene in 2002 with the FEU Tamaraws where he won Rookie of the Year honors. With the Tamaraws struggling to enter the final four, he was still able to put up a decent performance. One of the highlights of his freshman year was a game-tying three against the eventual champion Ateneo Blue Eagles.

In 2003, he led the Tamaraws to the UAAP title for the first time in six seasons, sweeping the Blue Eagles in the process. He was a candidate to win the Most Valuable Player Award, but was beaten by University of the East star James Yap. However, by leading the Tamaraws to the title, he was named Finals MVP. He was also named Defensive Player of the Year and was part of the Mythical Five together with season MVP Yap, Rich Alvarez, Paul Artadi, and Reynaldo Mendoza.

He would win the Most Valuable Player award the next season (2004) but the Tamaraws lost to the De La Salle Green Archers in three crucial games. However, with the controversy that surrounded the Archers, the title was then awarded to FEU. He also made it to the UAAP Mythical Five alongside Mark Cardona, LA Tenorio, Paolo Bugia and Dennis Miranda.

In his last year (2005) in the UAAP, he again led the team to the title by sweeping the Green Archers in an anticipated championship rematch against La Salle, thereby giving the Tamaraws a three-peat from 2003 to 2005. He was awarded Season MVP and Finals MVP for that season, and was also named to the Mythical Five with Mark Isip, Tenorio, Edwin Asoro and Joseph Yeo.

He is one of the only two players in the FEU Tamaraws that had his jersey (#19) retired. The other one was Johnny Abarrientos.

=== Philippine Basketball League ===
In 2003, Santos made his PBL debut for Viva Mineral Water, a team composed of fellow FEU teammates. After a slow start, he led the Water Force all the way to the PBL Unity Cup finals, where they lost in five games to Hapee Toothpaste.

In 2004, he led Viva to its first PBL crown defeating Welcoat Paints in the 2004 Unity Cup. He was adjudged PBL MVP of the tournament and was part of the 2004 Mythical Five alongside former PBA players Jojo Tangkay and Chester Tolomia and teammates Miranda and Isip. In 2006, he led Magnolia Ice Cream to the PBL Heroes Cup title, coming back from 0–2 deficit to defeat Welcoat Paints. In the PBL Unity Cup, Magnolia made an early exit. However, he still made the Mythical Second Team in his final PBL conference.

== Professional career ==
=== Air21 Express / Burger King Titans/Whoppers (2006–2009) ===
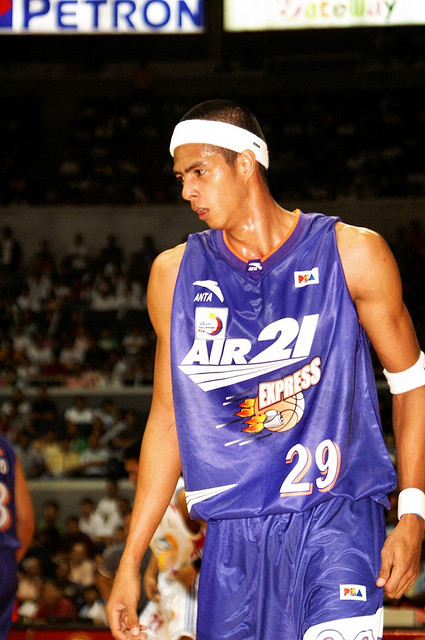
Santos with Air21 in 2007

In the 2006 PBA draft, Santos was selected second overall by the Air21 Express. He later signed a deal to play his first three seasons with the team, playing alongside Ranidel de Ocampo, Yancy de Ocampo, and KG Canaleta. He chose to wear the number 29 since his usual number 19 was already worn by Wynne Arboleda.

He ranked first among rookies in scoring during the Philippine Cup and almost led the Express to a quarterfinals appearance only to lose against the Sta. Lucia Realtors in a knockout match.

Santos was one of the leading contenders for the Rookie of the Year honors at the season's end with the likes of Sta. Lucia's Kelly Williams and Welcoat's Jay-R Reyes as among the possible winners. Williams eventually won the ROY award. But Santos was part of the All-Rookie Team together with Williams, Jay-R Reyes, Jireh Ibañes and LA Tenorio.

=== Petron Blaze Boosters / San Miguel Beermen (2009–2021) ===
During the off season Arwind Santos finally got his wish to play for the San Miguel Beermen, the winningest team in the history of the Philippine Basketball Association. None among the officials confirmed the trade although a highly placed source revealed that Santos was shipped to the Beermen in exchange for 6'5" power forward Marc Pingris, 6'6" sophomore center Ken Bono and San Miguel's 2010 first-round pick.

In the first round of the 2010–11 Philippine Cup, San Miguel compiled an 11–3 record while Santos averaged 16.6 points per game. In the 2011 PBA Governors Cup, he was awarded with the Best Player of the Conference. He also led his team to an improbable championship in the Governor's Cup conference over the highly favored Talk 'N Text team who were aiming to complete a rare grand slam. In so doing, he was named the Phoenix Fuels-PBA Press Corps Finals MVP.

In the 2011–12 season, Santos led Petron Blaze Boosters to a pair of semifinal showings in the PBA Philippine Cup and PBA Governors Cup in a rather disappointing season for him and the team that led to speculations that coach Agustin is now on the way out.

In the 2012–13 season, Santos led the Petron Blaze Boosters to a runner-up finish in the season-ending Governors Cup against the San Mig Coffee Mixers in a series that went the distance, 3–4. While his team lost the championship, Santos won his second BPC award in the season-ending Governor's Cup by edging out teammates June Mar Fajardo and Alex Cabagnot. He won his first-ever MVP award with a total of 2,840 points beating out Barangay Ginebra's LA Tenorio (2,819) and Talk N' Text's Jayson Castro (1,682). He also made it to the Mythical First Team for the sixth straight year and the All-Defensive Team for the seventh straight year. During the season, Santos also claimed the All-Star MVP alongside Jeff Chan.

In the Philippine Cup of the 2014–15 PBA season, Santos led the San Miguel Beermen to the championship alongside current MVP June Mar Fajardo in a grueling 7-game series against the Alaska Aces. For his consistent play in the finals, Santos was named the Petron Sprint 4T Finals MVP, his second Finals MVP award.

On October 14, 2016, Santos was recognized during the PBA Leo Awards Night as he was named to the PBA Mythcial First Team.

During the second quarter of game five of the 2019 PBA Commissioner's Cup finals, after TNT player Terrence Jones committed a foul, Santos made "monkey" gestures addressing Jones at the bench of San Miguel. Initially he refused to apologize stating "I’m going to apologize? No. It depends on him. If he was annoyed, he’s a real monkey." PBA commissioner Willie Marcial sanctioned Santos with a ₱200,000 fine, 100 hours of community service and to undergo counseling on equality and racial discrimination. Santos later issued an apology via his Instagram and Twitter account.

=== NorthPort Batang Pier (2021–2023) ===
On November 8, 2021, after 12 years with the Beermen, Santos was traded to NorthPort Batang Pier for Vic Manuel. On May 19, 2022, Santos signed a one-year extension with the team.

Santos also became the oldest to win Defensive Player of the Year when he won it for the third time in his career. Aside from winning the DPOY for the 2021 season, he also was part of the Mythical First Team and member of the All-Defensive team during the Leo Awards. On July 2, 2022, he became the newest member of the PBA's 10,000 Point Club when he made a fadeaway baseline jumper in the third quarter against his former team.

=== Pampanga Giant Lanterns (2023–2024) ===
Santos was among the players listed as part of the Pampanga Giant Lanterns' roster ahead of the 2023 MPBL season. However, he would continue to be with NorthPort for the PBA on Tour. On October 5, 2023, it was announced that Santos would make his debut in the Maharlika Pilipinas Basketball League with the team for the first game of their 2023 playoffs campaign. The Lanterns would go on to win the 2023 MPBL finals, giving Santos his tenth professional league championship.

In 2024, Santos negotiated his return to the PBA and rejoin the San Miguel Beermen. However, he aborted the plan due to "complications" as Northport still owns contractual rights over him. Instead in May 2024, San Miguel retired his No. 29 jersey.

After being unlisted in Pampanga's initial 2024 roster, Santos rejoined the Giant Lanterns for a second season on July 1, 2024. However he did not play for the rest of the year as the Lanterns defended their title.

=== Basilan Starhorse (2025) ===
The Basilan Starhorse announced that they have signed Santos in February 2025, marking his MPBL return.

In October 2025, after the South Division quarterfinals game between Basilan and the GenSan Warriors, Santos was fined and indefinitelly suspended for hitting GenSan's Tonton Bringas in the face. Santos insist he was just responding in kind to Bringas' alleged dirty plays and was exasperated on why no penalty was imposed to who he believed provoked the incident. Basilan backed Santos and urged MPBL a "fair review" of the incident.

== PBA career statistics ==
Legend
GP	Games played	MPG	Minutes per game
FG%	Field-goal percentage	3P%	3-point field-goal percentage	FT%	Free-throw percentage
RPG	Rebounds per game	APG	Assists per game	SPG	Steals per game
BPG	Blocks per game	PPG	Points per game	**Bold**	Career high

As of the end of 2022–23 season

=== Season-by-season averages ===
Year	Team	GP	MPG	FG%	3P%	FT%	RPG	APG	SPG	BPG	PPG
2006–07	Air21	44	29.0	.424	.274	.752	8.3	.9	.8	1.2	14.2
2007–08	Air21	51	34.3	.430	.250	.704	9.6	1.7	**1.2**	1.5	16.3
2008–09	Air21 / Burger King	44	31.7	.406	.274	.708	7.8	1.2	**1.2**	1.1	**16.7**
2009–10	San Miguel	55	31.4	**.480**	.226	.675	7.9	1.3	1.1	1.3	14.6
2010–11	San Miguel / Petron	56	**36.3**	.429	.266	.702	**10.7**	1.2	1.0	1.3	15.3
2011–12	Petron	46	33.5	.455	.267	.690	**10.7**	1.3	.9	1.4	15.0
2012–13	Petron	52	31.0	.430	.197	.636	8.5	1.2	1.0	1.0	12.5
2013–14	Petron / San Miguel	42	36.0	.436	.274	.683	8.6	**1.9**	1.0	1.1	15.1
2014–15	San Miguel	54	31.9	.406	.306	.680	7.1	1.4	.8	1.2	12.5
2015–16	San Miguel	52	32.3	.376	.287	**.804**	7.4	1.8	.7	1.5	12.9
2016–17	San Miguel	**58**	31.0	.436	.327	.728	7.1	1.5	.7	1.2	14.1
2017–18	San Miguel	57	31.8	.417	.316	.699	7.1	**1.9**	**1.2**	**1.7**	13.6
2019	San Miguel	57	28.1	.347	.287	.700	6.0	1.6	.6	1.2	9.6
2020	San Miguel	13	35.7	.415	**.368**	.611	9.5	1.8	1.1	1.0	12.4
2021	San Miguel	32	36.2	.424	.317	.706	8.8	1.7	.8	1.5	14.2
2021	NorthPort	32	36.2	.424	.317	.706	8.8	1.7	.8	1.5	14.2
2022–23	NorthPort	21	28.5	.345	.207	.727	6.7	1.3	.8	1.2	9.6
Career		734	32.3	.420	.282	.703	8.2	1.5	.9	1.3	13.8

== National team career ==
He also suited up for the Philippine National Team a couple of times under coach Chot Reyes in 2006 with the likes of LA Tenorio and Joseph Yeo and competed in the 28th Jones Cup but didn't make it to the final line up in 2007. In 2009, he was included to the Powerade Team Pilipinas under Coach Yeng Guiao wherein the team landed 8th overall in the 2009 FIBA Asia Championship.

In August 2010, Santos, along with other PBA players, was considered as a possible reinforcement for Smart Gilas, as the developmental Philippine national basketball team was looking to make the squad more competitive. The NBA Generations team featured NBA legends Dominique Wilkins, Tim Hardaway, Vlade Divac and Robert Horry and coached by NBA six-time MVP and Hall of Famer Kareem Abdul-Jabbar. Making up the PBA All-Stars line-up were PBA legends Alvin Patrimonio, Allan Caidic, Ronnie Magsanoc, Benjie Paras and Kenneth Duremdes and active players Santos, Wynne Arboleda, Japeth Aguilar, Dondon Hontiveros, Jay-R Reyes, Marc Pingris, Enrico Villanueva, Sonny Thoss, Willie Miller and Joseph Yeo.

In 2012, Santos was listed to the 16-man pool requested by Chot Reyes to be included in the Smart Gilas Pilipinas 2.0. He was unable to sign the commitment letter due to the Petron management's disapproval.

== Personal life ==
Santos married Karyn Maye Umayam and started living together in Sampaloc, Manila. On December 9, 2005, Umayam gave birth to their first child but barely a month after, Santos left his wife and child. When Umayan found out that Santos was living with Ivette Iza Gavieres, daughter of his former FEU coach Danny Gavieres, who was pregnant, she decided to go back to her parents' house in Batangas City.

Arwind Santos is known as the first player in the Bawal Judgmental! segment of variety show Eat Bulaga! to perfect the game and win a total of at least ₱50,000.

== Honors and achievements ==
=== UAAP ===
- Rookie of the Year
  - 65th UAAP season
- 2-Time UAAP Most Valuable Player
  - 67th UAAP season
  - 68th UAAP season
- 2-Time UAAP Finals Most Valuable Player
  - 66th UAAP season
  - 68th UAAP season
- 3-Time Mythical First Five Member
  - 66th UAAP season
  - 67th UAAP season
  - 68th UAAP season

=== PBL ===
- 1-Time PBL Most Valuable Player
  - 2004 PBL Unity Cup
- 1-Time PBL Mythical First Team Member
  - 2004 PBL Unity Cup
- 1-Time PBL Mythical Second Team Member
  - 2006 PBL Unity Cup

=== PBA ===
- 1-Time PBA Most Valuable Player
  - 2012–2013 PBA Season
- 11-Time PBA Mythical First Team Member
  - 2007–2008 PBA Season
  - 2008–2009 PBA Season
  - 2009–2010 PBA Season
  - 2010–2011 PBA Season
  - 2011–2012 PBA Season
  - 2012–2013 PBA Season
  - 2014–2015 PBA Season
  - 2015–2016 PBA Season
  - 2016–2017 PBA Season
  - 2017–2018 PBA Season
  - 2020–2021 PBA Season
- 8-Time PBA All Defensive Team Member
  - 2006–2007 PBA Season
  - 2007–2008 PBA Season
  - 2008–2009 PBA Season
  - 2009–2010 PBA Season
  - 2010–2011 PBA Season
  - 2011–2012 PBA Season
  - 2012–2013 PBA Season
  - 2020–2021 PBA Season
- 12-Time PBA All-Star
  - 2007–2008 PBA Season
  - 2008–2009 PBA Season
  - 2009–2010 PBA Season
  - 2010–2011 PBA Season
  - 2011–2012 PBA Season
  - 2012–2013 PBA Season
  - 2013–2014 PBA Season
  - 2014–2015 PBA Season
  - 2016–2017 PBA Season
  - 2017–2018 PBA Season
  - 2018–2019 PBA Season
  - 2022–2023 PBA Season
- 3-Time PBA Defensive Player of the Year
  - 2007–2008 PBA Season
  - 2010–2011 PBA Season
  - 2020–2021 PBA Season
- 3-Time PBA Mythical Second Team Member
  - 2006–2007 PBA Season
  - 2017–2018 PBA Season
  - 2018–2019 PBA Season
- PBA All Rookie Team Member
  - 2006–2007 PBA Season
- 2-Time Best Player Of The Conference
  - 2010–2011 Governor's Cup
  - 2012–2013 Governor's Cup
- 2-Time PBA Finals MVP
  - 2011 Governor's Cup
  - 2014–2015 Philippine Cup
- 1-Time PBA Blitz Game MVP
  - 2007 PBA Rookie-Sophomore Blitz Game
- 2-Time PBA All Star Game MVP
  - 2013 PBA All Star Game
  - 2019 PBA All Star Game

=== MPBL ===
- Champion
  - 2023 MPBL Season
