= Mail and More Comets =

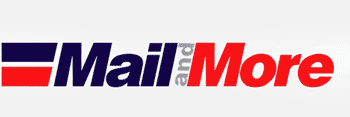
- Leagues: Philippine Basketball League
- Founded: 2006
- History: Mail and More Comets; 2006-2007; Burger King Whoppers; 2007-2008; Burger King Stunners; 2008-2009
- Location: Philippines
- Team colors: Red,White
- President: Joey Lina
- Head coach: Allan Gregorio
- Website: PBL website
Home	Away

The Mail and More Comets is a basketball team that played in the Philippine Basketball League and is owned by Lina Group of Companies

== Final roster ==
Mail and More Comets
Head coach: Allan Gregorio
SG	1	J.R. Tecson	San Beda
PF	2	Vic Manuel	PSBA
G	3	Christian Luanzon	Santo Tomas
PG	5	Chico Tirona	San Beda
SF	6	Bam Gamalinda	San Beda
C	8	Jason Ballesteros	San Sebastian
PF	9	Jake Pascual	San Beda
PF	10	Jayson Nocom	Jose Rizal
SG	11	Nicho Pupos	ACSAT
C	12	Dave Marcelo	San Beda
C	13	Brian Ilad	De La Salle
PF	14	Jay-R Taganas	San Beda
SF	15	Ogie Menor	San Beda
PG	16	Borgie Hermida	San Beda
PG	18	Marcy Arellano	East
G	20	Nestor David	UP- Diliman
G	21	Abby Santos	UP- Diliman
SF	45	Marnel Baracael	Far Eastern
(C) - Captain, (IN) - Inactive Player			Mail and More Comets

Other people

- Assistant coaches: Jerry Codiñera, Vergel Meneses, Gino Manuel, Mark Herrera, Mark Jomalesa
- Support Staff: Andrew Marcelito Cesar, Eugene Tantuan
- Team manager: Patrick Gregorio
- Owners: Manny V. Pangilinan, Bert Lina, Ricky Vargas, Lito Alvarez

== Former players and coaches ==
- Doug Kramer
- Lawrence Chongson (coach)
- Macky Escalona
- JR Quinahan
- Ronjay Buenafe
- Jerby del Rosario
- Mike Bravo
- Elmer Espiritu
