= Harbour Centre Batang Pier =

- Leagues: PBL
- Founded: 2004
- Folded: 2009
- History: Harbour Centre Port Masters; 2004–2007; Harbour Centre Batang Pier; 2007–2009; Oracle Residences Titans; 2009
- Location: Philippines
- Head coach: Glenn Capacio
- Championships: PBL (7): *2006 Unity Cup; *2006-07 Silver Cup; *2007 Unity Cup; *2007 V-Go Extreme Cup; *2008 Lipovitan Amino Cup; *2008-09 PG Flex Linoleum Cup; *2009 PG Flex Unity Cup; SEABA (1): 2007 Champions Cup
- Website: PBL website
Home	Away

The Harbour Centre Batang Pier was a basketball team playing in the Philippine Basketball League (PBL) and was owned by Mikee Romero. In the PBL, they are tied for the most championships won in league history. The team was known the Oracle Residences Titans during their final season in 2009.

== History ==
Harbour Centre hired Jorge Gallent as their head coach. With him leading the team, Harbour Centre won six straight championships. They first won the 2006 Unity Cup and the 2006–2007 Silver Cup. Harbour Centre then changed its moniker to the Batang Pier and won four more titles.

In 2009, the franchise became known as the Oracle Residences Titans, as Romero retired the Harbour Centre name. They also hired a new coach, Glenn Capacio. They then won the league's final championship that year, its seventh. This tied them with Magnolia Ice Cream / Instafood and Stag Pale Pilsen / Tanduay Gold for most championships in PBL history.

== Final roster ==
Oracle Residences Titans
Head coach: Glenn Capacio
G	3	Jason Nocom +	JRU
G	4	Mark Barroca	FEU
(S)	5	Eric Suguitan	ACSAT
(R)	6	Jun Tanuan	FEU
G	7	Benedict Fernandez	FEU
C	8	Edwin Asoro	NU
PG	9	Robert Labagala	UE
G	10	Rico Maierhofer	La Salle
G	11	Paul Sanga	FEU
C	12	Aldrech Ramos	FEU
G	13	Chris Timberlake	North Florida
F	14	Jens Knuttel	FEU
F	15	JR Cawaling	FEU
(S)	16	Jerwin Gaco	La Salle
(S)	18	RJ Jazul	Letran
(S)	20	Nick Stephens
F	21	Floyd Dedicatoria	JRU
F	23	Reil Cervantes	FEU
F	24	John Marion Wilson	JRU
(R)	33	Angelus John Raymundo	UE
F	37	Veejay Serios	UP Diliman
(R)	39	Von Harry Lanete	Visayas
C	45	Marnel Baracael	FEU
(C) – Captain, (S) – Suspended, (R) – Reserve			Oracle Residences

Other people

- Assistant coaches: Ryan Dy, Allan Gamboa, Lord Nino Albar
- Consultant: Junel Baculi
- Trainer: Senen Duenas
- Team Physicians: Dr. Chris Cruz, Dr. Ireneo "IBY" Bautista
- Physical Therapist: Dr. Chris Cruz, Dr. Ireneo "IBY" Bautista
- Support Staff: Ruben de Asis, Tano Hanopol, Jun Tenerife, Miguel Dy Frayres
- Team manager: Erick Arejola
- Assistant Team manager: Albert Tirona
- Owner: Michael Romero

== Notable players and coaches ==
- Marcy Arellano
- Jason Ballesteros
- Paolo Bugia
- Mark Cardona
- Gabby Espinas
- JC Intal
- Chico Lanete
- Solomon Mercado
- Derrick Pumaren (consultant)
- Dindo Pumaren (coach; predecessor of Jorge Gallent)
- Rob Reyes
- LA Tenorio
- Joseph Yeo
- Tonichi Yturri (coach and team manager)
- Tyrone Tang
- Jayson Castro
- Boyet Bautista
- Al Vergara
- Jorge Gallent (coach, 2004–2009)
- Josh Urbiztondo

== Finals Most Valuable Players ==
Harbour Centre's championship would not be possible if not for some key players that stepped up when they were needed the most.

LA Tenorio - Tenorio played for Harbour during the 2006 championship where they were the lowest seed to win a championship. He led Batang Pier along with La Salle Standout Joseph Yeo against Toyota Otis.

Chico Lanete - Chico proved his ability when he led Harbour to their 2nd and 3rd crown. Known as a reliable scorer he guided Batang Pier past their opponents in the Finals. Lanete is a back to back Finals MVP

TY Tang - After leading La Salle to a championship, Tang later played for Harbour against the previously undefeated Happee team led by Gabe Norwood. Harbour trailed by 19 points during the game, but forced overtime. In overtime, Tang made two three-point field goals that contributed to Harbour winning the championship, the team's fourth title.

Jayson Castro - Jayson Castro the 3 time PBL MVP scored 30 points as they once again defeated Hapee led by Norwood. Castro used his quick speed as he mocked all the guards thrown at him. He had an unstoppable performance all series long.

Mark Barocca - Mark Barocca despite being a rookie this FEU star cannot be underestimated. Barocca despite a bad first half, exploded in the 4th quarter as he scored in Harbour's run. Barocca is the last Finals MVP of Harbour Centre before changing the franchise name to Oracle Residences.

Chris Timberlake - Chris Timberlake led Oracle to their seventh straight title and their last, Timberlake is the last Finals MVP for Harbour Centre/ Oracle franchise.
