= Hapee Fresh Fighters =

Philippine basketball team

- League: PBL (1994–2010); PBA D-League (2014–2015)
- Founded: 1994
- Folded: 2015
- History: Kutitap Cavity Fighters (1994–1996); Hapee Cavity Fighters (1996–1997); Dazz Dishwashing Paste (1997–2002); Hapee-Nenaco-Ateneo (2002); Fash Liquid Detergent (2003–2004); Hapee-PCU Dolphins (2005–2006); Dazz 'Sang Patak (2006–2007); Hapee Complete Protectors (2007–2008); Licealiz Shampoo Hair Doctors (2008-2009); Hapee Fresh Fighters (2014–2015)
- Team colors: Yellow, Black, White
- Company: Lamoiyan Corporation
- Head coach: Ronnie Magsanoc
- Ownership: Dr. Cecilio K. Pedro
- Championships: PBL (3): *1996 Import Reinforced; *2003 Sunkist-Unity Cup; *2003-04 Platinum Cup FIBA Asia (1): *1996 Champions Cup; PBA D-League (1): *2014–15 Aspirants'
Home	Away

The Hapee Fresh Fighters was a basketball team owned by Lamoiyan Corporation that played in the PBA Developmental League (PBA D-League).

The franchise began in the Philippine Basketball League where they won three titles from 1994 until the league became dormant in 2010. The franchise was revived in 2014 when it took over the franchise of the NLEX Road Warriors in the PBA D-League. The team forged a school tie-up with San Beda College for its participation in the PBA D-League.

The team also played in the ABC Champions Cup winning the 1996 edition.

== History ==
=== PBL ===
Behind Chinese import Ma Jian and locals Biboy Simon, Erwin Framo, Joel Dualan, and Leo Austria, Hapee won its first PBL title. They also got to represent the Philippines in the 1996 ABC Champions Cup. With the help of PBA imports Bobby Parks and Tony Harris, Hapee was able to win the country its fourth ABC Champions title.

In 2002, Dazz signed PJ Simon, an ex-pro from the Davao Eagles in the Metropolitan Basketball Association. In his first conference with the team, the 2002–03 PBL Challenge Cup, he led them to a finals appearance. He led them to two championships in the 2003 Unity Cup and 2004 Platinum Cup, and was awarded league MVP in 2004. Throughout the 2000s, Hapee had several more runner-up finishes.

=== PBA D-League ===
In 2014, Lamoiyan Corporation announced that Hapee would be entering the PBA D-League in partnership with San Beda College for the 2014–15 Aspirants' Cup. It took over the franchise of the NLEX Road Warriors, who had moved on to the PBA. Former San Beda head coach Ronnie Magsanoc was announced as this team's head coach. The roster was composed of San Beda players, Kirk Long and Chris Newsome from Ateneo, Arnold Van Opstal from DLSU, veteran Marvin Hayes, Bobby Ray Parks Jr. and Troy Rosario from NU, and NCAA MVP Scottie Thompson.

In the Aspirants' Cup, Hapee finished second in the standings behind the unbeaten Cagayan Valley Rising Suns. They beat Cagayan in the finals. Parks was named as the Aspirants' Cup MVP. In the Foundation Cup, they made it to the finals once again, but this time they lost to the Café France Bakers.

== Final roster ==
Hapee Fresh Fighters roster
Players

Pos.	#	POB	Name	Height	Weight	DOB (YYYY–MM–DD)	From
G/F	1	(United States)	Chris Newsome	6 ft 2 in (1.88 m)			Ateneo
PG	3	(Philippines)	Baser Amer	6 ft 0 in (1.83 m)			San Beda
PG	4	(Philippines)	Ryusei Koga	5 ft 8 in (1.73 m)			San Beda
C	5	(Philippines)	Troy Rosario	6 ft 7 in (2.01 m)			National-U
G	6	(Philippines)	Earl Thompson	6 ft 0 in (1.83 m)			UPHSD
C	7	(Germany)	Arnold Van Opstal	6 ft 7 in (2.01 m)			De La Salle
F	8	(Philippines)	Jaypee Mendoza	6 ft 4 in (1.93 m)			San Beda
C	10	(Nigeria)	Ola Adeogun	6 ft 9 in (2.06 m)			San Beda
F	12	(United States)	Kirk Long	6 ft 2 in (1.88 m)			Ateneo
G	13	(Philippines)	Garvo Lanete	6 ft 1 in (1.85 m)			San Beda
F	17	(Philippines)	Micole Sorela	6 ft 4 in (1.93 m)			San Beda
F	18	(Philippines)	Arthur dela Cruz	6 ft 4 in (1.93 m)			San Beda
G/F	21	(Philippines)	Ray-Ray Parks	6 ft 4 in (1.93 m)			National-U
F	29	(Philippines)	Marvin Hayes	6 ft 2 in (1.88 m)			José Rizal

Coaches
Head coach
- (Philippines) Ronnie Magsanoc (UP)
Assistant(s)
- (Philippines) Xavier Nunag (UP)
- (Philippines) Benjie Paras (UP)

Legend
- (DP) Unsigned draft pick
- (FA) Free agent
- (S) Suspended
- Injured

== Notable players ==
- Rich Alvarez
- Mark Borboran
- Jayson Castro
- Larry Fonacier
- Caloy Garcia
- Reed Juntilla
- Gabe Norwood
- Larry Rodriguez
- Enrico Villanueva
- Cyrus Baguio
- Gec Chia
- Peter June Simon
- Jervy Cruz
- Gabby Espinas
- LA Tenorio
- John Ferriols
- Beau Belga
- Chris Tiu
- JVee Casio
- Francis Mercado
- Joel Dualan
- Eugene Tan
- Jesus Ramon Pido
- Leo Austria
- Ronilo Padilla
- Erwin Framo
- Frechie Ang
- Jovie Sese
- Aldrich Jareño
- Biboy Simon
- JC Intal
- Chris Newsome
- Troy Rosario
- Baser Amer
- Arthur dela Cruz
- Ola Adeogun
- Arnold Van Opstal
- Bobby Ray Parks Jr.
- Garvo Lanete
- Ma Jian
- Bobby Parks
- Tony Harris
