= Jorge Gallent =

Filipino basketball player and coach

San Miguel Beermen
- Position: Team consultant
- League: PBA

Personal information
- Born: June 18, 1968 (age 58)
- Listed height: 6 ft 2 in (1.88 m)

Career information
- College: FEU
- Coaching career: 2004–present

Career history

Playing
- 1992: A&W Root Beer
- 1995–1998: Stag Pale Pilseners
- 1999: Tanduay Rhum Masters

Coaching
- 2004–2009: Harbour Centre Batang Pier
- 2007–2008: San Sebastian
- 2009: Air21 Express (assistant)
- 2009–2010: B-Meg Derby Ace Llamados (assistant)
- 2010–2011: B-Meg Derby Ace Llamados
- 2011–2014: Barangay Ginebra San Miguel (assistant)
- 2014–2023: Petron Blaze Boosters / San Miguel Beermen (assistant)
- 2023–2024: San Miguel Beermen
- 2024–present: San Miguel Beermen (consultant)

Career highlights
- As player: 7× PBL champion (1995 Reinforced, 1995 All-Filipino, 1995–96 Danny Floro, 1996 Danny Floro, 1997 Makati Mayor's, 1997–98 All Filipino, 1998 First Centennial); As head coach: PBA champion (2023–24 Commissioner's); PBA All-Star Game head coach (2024); 6× PBL champion (2006 Unity, 2006–07 Silver, 2007 Unity, 2007 V-Go, 2008 Amino Sports, 2008–09 Sports PG Flex Linoleum); As assistant coach: 10× PBA champion (2009–10 Philippine, 2014–15 Philippine, 2015 Governors', 2015–16 Philippine, 2016–17 Philippine, 2017 Commissioner's, 2017–18 Philippine, 2019 Philippine, 2019 Commissioner's, 2022 Philippine); As team consultant: 2× PBA champion (2025 Philippine, 2025–26 Philippine)

Jorge Gallent (born June 18, 1968) is a Filipino professional basketball coach and former player. He serves as the consultant for the San Miguel Beermen of the Philippine Basketball Association (PBA).

== Collegiate career ==
Gallent participated in the University Athletic Association of the Philippines for the FEU Tamaraws Men's Basketball team but it ended as the result of a motorcycle accident and lost his right eye in 1988 in Alabang Hills. He then shifted into non contact sports and became a topnotch junior golfer.

== Development league ==
In the Philippine Basketball League, Gallent saw action for the A&W Root Beer team in 1992. He was also part of the Stag Pale Pilsen grandslam team. He would serve as an assistant coach for the Welcoat Paintmasters. His head coaching break came with Harbour Centre Batang Pier as a replacement for Dindo Pumaren. He guided the team into winning 6 titles.

== PBA career ==
Gallent played briefly for the Tanduay Rhum Masters during the 1999 PBA season under Alfrancis Chua. He started his PBA coaching profession as the Air21 Express assistant to Yeng Guiao during the professional league's 34th season. He then transferred to B-Meg Derby Ace Llamados the same season as part of the coaching staff of Ryan Gregorio. Gallent was eventually selected as the Llamados head coach with Gregorio's departure to the Meralco Bolts at the end of 2009–10 PBA season.

== Coaching career ==
B-Meg Derby Ace Llamados started the 2010–11 PBA season without three starters Kerby Raymundo, Marc Pingris and Rafi Reavis because of injuries. While star player James Yap slowly recovered from a nose operation which led to 3-straight loses for Gallent's team. Gallent's first win as head coach came against former coach Ryan Gregorio with a 75–71 conquest of Meralco Bolts.

Under Gallent's watch, The Llamados recovered and streaked to consecutive wins in the elimination round with vastly improved plays, showcasing their talent and cohesion even without the injured frontliners.

In the middle of 2023 PBA Commissioner's Cup, Gallent was appointed as San Miguel Beermen's interim coach, while Leo Austria was restricted for medical reasons. He guided the team to sweep the last four games of the elimination round and sweeping the quarterfinals. He returned as assistant coach when Austria returned. He was officially appointed as team's head coach for the next conference.

== Coaching record ==
=== Collegiate record ===
Season	Team	GP	W	L	PCT	Finish	PG	PW	PL	PCT	Results
2007	SSC-R	12	4	8	.333	6th	—	—	—	—	Eliminated
2008	SSC-R	14	9	5	.643	5th	2	0	2	.000	4th-seed playoff
Totals		26	13	13	.500		2	0	2	.000	0 championships

=== Professional record ===
Season	Team	Conference	G	W	L	PCT	Finish	PG	W	L	PCT	Results
2010–11	B-Meg	Philippine	14	7	7	.500	4th	8	4	4	.500	Semifinals
2010–11	B-Meg	Commissioner's	9	4	5	.444	7th	—	—	—	—	Eliminated
2010–11	B-Meg	Governors'	8	4	4	.500	6th	5	1	4	.200	Semifinals
2022–23	San Miguel	Commissioner's	4	4	0	1.000	5th	6	3	3	.500	(interim)
2022–23	San Miguel	Governors'	11	9	2	.818	2nd	4	1	3	.250	Semifinals
Totals			46	28	18	.608	Playoff Total	23	9	14	.255	0 championships
