= 2002–03 Philippine Basketball League season =

2002–03 PBL season
- Duration: November 4, 2002 – June 19, 2003
- Teams: 9
- TV partner: Solar Sports (NBN)
- Season MVP: Rommel Adducul; Gary David
- Challenge Cup champions: Welcoat Paints
- Challenge Cup runners-up: Dazz
- Sunkist-Unity Cup champions: Hapee Toothpaste
- Sunkist-Unity Cup runners-up: Viva Mineral Water

Seasons
- ← 2001-02 2003-04 →

The 2002–03 season of the Philippine Basketball League (PBL).

== 2002-03 Challenge Cup ==
=== Team standings ===
Group A	Win	Loss	Coach
Welcoat Paints	9	2	Leo Austria
Dazz Dishwashing	7	4	Junel Baculi
Blu Detergent	7	4	Leo Isaac
LBC-Batangas	7	4	Nash Racela

Group B	Win	Loss	Coach
ICTSI-La Salle	8	4	Franz Pumaren
Montaña Jewels	6	6	Ronnie Dojillo
John-O	5	7	Dong Vergeire
Cheeseballs-Shark	3	9	Jing Ruiz / Philip Cezar
Sunkist-Pampanga	2	10	Boyzie Zamar

Welcoat Paintmasters is the top team in the eliminations and will enjoy a twice-to-beat advantage against the fourth finisher in the crossover semis. Welcoat will meet the winner of ICTSI and LBC-Batangas. Blu Detergent and Dazz finished with identical 7-4 won-loss cards and will play in the other crossover semis.

=== Crossover semifinals ===
January 13

recap

ICTSI-La Salle 79, LBC-Batangas 39

Pasig Sports Center, Pasig

January 13

Dazz 85, Blu Detergent 83 (OT)

Pasig Sports Center, Pasig

January 16

recap

LBC-Batangas 91, ICTSI-La Salle 84

Makati Coliseum, Makati

January 18

Welcoat Paints 84, LBC-Batangas 65

Pasig Sports Center, Pasig

January 18

Dazz 73, Blu Detergent 65

Pasig Sports Center, Pasig

Welcoat and Dazz had a twice-to-beat advantage against the two other semifinalist and they made it to the championship round.

=== Finals ===
January 23

recap

Welcoat Paints 77, Dazz 68 (OT)

Quezon Convention Center, Lucena City

January 25

recap

Welcoat Paints 65, Dazz 63

La Salle Centrum, Lipa City

January 27

Welcoat Paints 80, Dazz 71 (OT)
Welcoat wins series, 3-0

Pasig Sports Center, Pasig

Comebacking Welcoat Paintmasters completed a three-game sweep over Dazz. Coach Leo Austria now won three PBL titles, two of which came when he was a Shark Energy Drink mentor. The Welcoat franchise won their fifth PBL championship, and all their series victories were via sweeps.

=== Individual awards ===
- Most Valuable Player: Rommel Adducul (Welcoat)
- Sportsmanship Award: Alex Compton (LBC-Batangas)
- Most Improved Player Award: Paul Artadi (Welcoat)
- Top Newcomer: Mark Cardona (ICTSI-La Salle)
- Finals MVP: Rommel Adducul and Ronald Tubid (Welcoat)
- Mythical First Team
  - Rommel Adducul (Welcoat)
  - Eddie Laure (Welcoat)
  - Ronald Tubid (Welcoat)
  - Aries Dimaunahan (Blu)
  - Mark Cardona (ICTSI-La Salle)

== 2003 Sunkist-Unity Cup ==
Semifinal standings	Win	Loss	PCT
Hapee Toothpaste	5	1	.833
Viva Mineral Water	4	2	.667
Montaña Jewels	3	3	.500
John-O	0	6	.000

Two new teams joined the league, replacing Cheeseballs-Shark and Sunkist-Pampanga, these are Viva Mineral Water, coach by Koy Banal, and Nutrilicious, handled by Monel Kallos.

Hapee (formerly Dazz) and Viva Mineral Water advances to the championship after the double-round semifinals among the top four teams in the eliminations.

=== Finals ===
June 7

recap

Hapee Toothpaste 57, Viva Mineral Water 64

Quezon Convention Center, Lucena City

June 10

recap

Hapee Toothpaste 52, Viva Mineral Water 43

Pasig Sports Center, Pasig

June 14

recap

Hapee Toothpaste 56, Viva Mineral Water 58

Pasig Sports Center, Pasig

June 17

recap

Hapee Toothpaste 80, Viva Mineral Water 65

Pasig Sports Center, Pasig

June 19

Hapee Toothpaste 64, Viva Mineral Water 62
Hapee wins series, 3-2

Pasig Sports Center, Pasig

Hapee Toothpaste won their first title since the 1996 Reinforced Conference, denying Viva Mineral Water a championship in their very first try. Hapee mentor Junel Baculi won his sixth title as a coach.
