= Jayson Castro =

Filipino basketball player (born 1986)

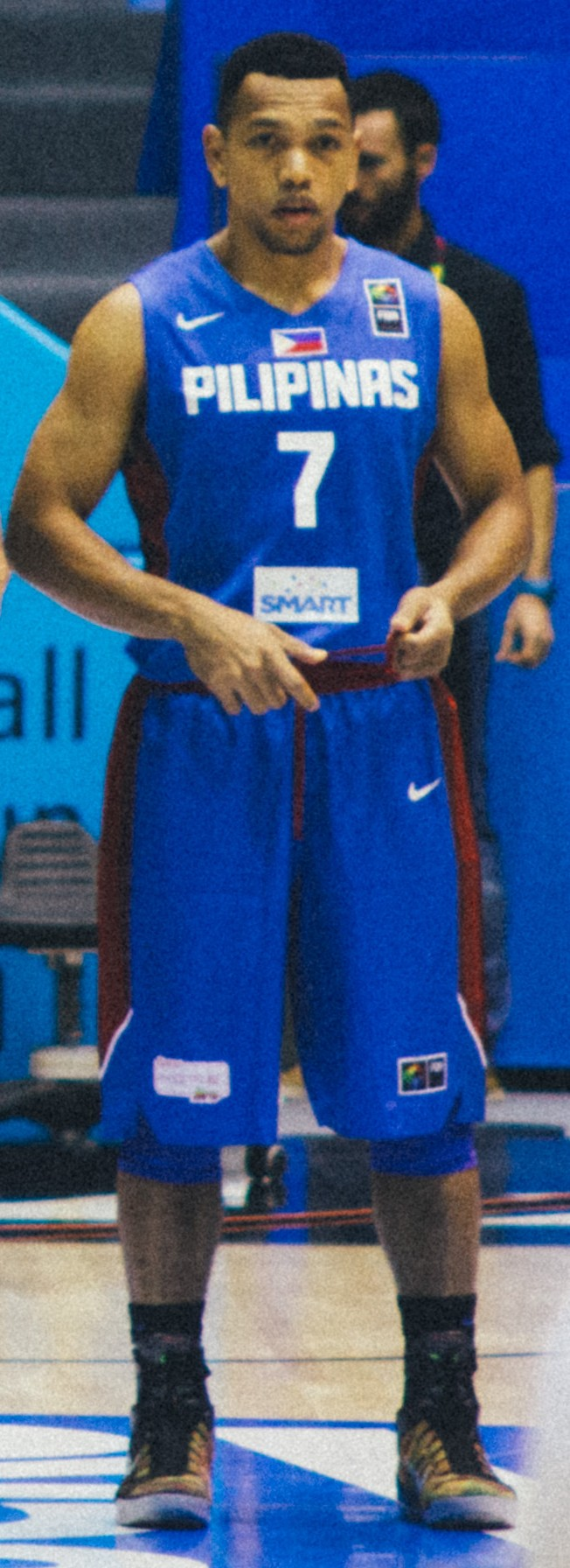
- Castro during 2014 FIBA World Cup

No. 17 – TNT Tropang 5G
- Position: Point guard
- League: PBA

Personal information
- Born: June 30, 1986 (age 40) Bacolor, Pampanga, Philippines
- Listed height: 5 ft 10 in (1.78 m)
- Listed weight: 185 lb (84 kg)

Career information
- High school: DHVSU (Bacolor, Pampanga)
- College: PCU
- PBA draft: 2008: 1st round, 3rd overall pick
- Drafted by: Talk 'N Text Tropang Texters
- Playing career: 2008–present

Career history
- 2008–present: Talk 'N Text Tropang Texters/TNT Tropang Texters/Tropang TNT/TNT KaTropa/TNT Tropang Giga/TNT Tropang 5G

Career highlights
- 10× PBA champion (2008–09 Philippine, 2010–11 Philippine, 2011 Commissioner's, 2011–12 Philippine, 2013 Philippine, 2015 Commissioner's, 2021 Philippine, 2023 Governors', 2024 Governors', 2024–25 Commissioner's); 3× PBA Finals MVP (2010–11 Philippine, 2011 Commissioner's, 2024 Governors'); 5× PBA Best Player of the Conference (2012–13 Philippine, 2014 Commissioner's, 2015 Commissioner's, 2016 Governors', 2019 Commissioners'); 9× PBA All-Star (2013–2019, 2023, 2024); 5× PBA Mythical First Team (2013–2016, 2019); 3× PBA Mythical Second Team (2011, 2012, 2017); 2× PBA Order of Merit (2016, 2023); PBA scoring champion (2014); PBA Most Improved Player (2011); 2× PBA Mr. Quality Minutes (2009, 2011); 50 Greatest Players in PBA History (2015 selection); NCAA Philippines champion (2004); 3× NCAA Philippines Mythical First Team (2004, 2005, 2006); 3× PBL champion (2007 Unity, 2007-08 V-Go Extreme, 2008 Lipovitan Amino); 3× PBL Most Valuable Player (2006-07 Silver, 2007 Unity, 2007-08 Season); PBL Finals MVP (2008 Lipovitan Amino Sports Drink Cup); 5× PBL Mythical First Team (2005-06 Heroes, 2006 Unity, 2006-07 Silver, 2007 Unity, 2007-08 Season); PBL Showcase Skills Challenge champion (2007); 2× FIBA Asia Championship All-Star Selection (2013, 2015); William Jones Cup Mythical Five (2015); Brunei Cup MVP (2008)

Jayson Castro William (born June 30, 1986) is a Filipino professional basketball player for the TNT Tropang 5G of the Philippine Basketball Association (PBA). His moniker is "The Blur" for his speed.

He played for the Philippine Christian University Dolphins in the National Collegiate Athletic Association, Philippine Basketball League teams Hapee-PCU Teeth Protectors and Harbour Centre Batang Pier.

== Amateur career ==
=== High school career ===
Originally from neighboring Betis, Guagua, Castro was a part of the high school basketball team of Don Honorio Ventura State University in Bacolor. Castro was the only player from his class to play college basketball, with Philippine Christian University (PCU) in Manila.

=== College career ===
Castro first played for the PCU Dolphins in the NCAA at the 2003 season as a 5'10" point guard. The Dolphins were not able to clinch a Final Four berth, finishing with a 5–9 record.

In the 2004 season, PCU was able to make a turnaround with Castro, Gabby Espinas and Robert Sanz at the helm, denying Letran a back-to-back championship run. Holding twice to beat advantage, the Dolphins needed an extra game that went into overtime to enter the finals. In the championship series against the University of Perpetual Help, the Dolphins swept the best-of-3 finals series to win their first NCAA championship.

In the 2005 season, the Dolphins made another Final Four appearance, beating Mapúa on their way to the Finals where they met Letran once again. The Dolphins won Game 1 with Castro scoring a game-high 20 points, however the Dolphins were beaten by Letran in the next two games, losing the championship.

In the 2006 season, Castro was named one of the Mythical 5; he and Espinas led PCU to a third consecutive Finals appearance, this time against San Beda College. Despite Castro scoring a team-high 16 points, the Dolphins were defeated by the Red Lions on Game 1. Castro's teammates stepped up on Game 2 to force a deciding game. In the third game, with PCU trailing by a point in the dying seconds, Castro passed off the game-winning shot to Beau Belga who missed his jumper to lose the championship for PCU. The Dolphins would be suspended the following year after irregularities on their junior team, thus ending Castro's collegiate career.

=== Philippine Basketball League ===
==== Addict Mobile ====
Castro was signed with the AMP Mobile Phone team, where he was a backup to LA Tenorio. His PCU teammates Gabby Espinas and Rob Sanz, remained in the Philippine Basketball League. They were joined by the Ateneo Blue Eagles team, including Paolo Bugia, LA Tenorio, and Magnum Membrere.

==== Harbour Centre Port Masters ====
Both Castro and Tenorio played for the Port Masters, with Castro remaining backup to LA Tenorio. He played with Mac Cardona and his former PCU teammates Gabby Espinas, Rob Sanz, Beau Belga, and Joel Solis.

==== Hapee PCU Teeth Masters ====
Castro then transferred to Hapee PCU. He remained with the team for a season with Gabby Espinas, Rob Sanz, Joel Solis, Mark Moreño and others. Hapee PCU had a disastrous season.

==== Hapee-PCU Teeth Sparklers ====
After PCU's championship, Lamoiyan Corporation sponsored the core of that team to participate in the PBL as the Hapee-PCU Teeth Sparklers. The Sparklers entered the Finals against the Harbour Centre Batang Pier and were defeated. Hapee made several more playoff runs but were beaten either by Harbour Centre or by Toyota-Otis (ironically mostly composed of Letran players).

In the midst of Jayson Castro's third season at Hapee, he was acquired by Junel Baculi, his coach in PCU, to join the RP team with Marvin Cruz, JC Intal, Ryan Araña, Chad Alonzo, and Beau Belga, with 2 imports. They claimed the SEABA 2006 club championship crown.

In the middle of the 2nd season and 3rd season, he was again acquired. He was with Gabe Norwood, Beau Belga, Chad Alonzo, Eugene Tan, Patrick Cabahug, and Jeff Chan. They reached the finals but lost the SEABA 2007 club championship crown.

==== Return to Harbour Centre ====
When PCU was suspended, Castro transferred to Harbour Centre and won 2 championships with them. After 2 conferences of sterling performances, Castro was named as the PBL 2007 Most Valuable Player. In the next season, Castro and the Batang Pier met Hapee, this time led by Filipino-American Gabe Norwood in both of the season's finals and beat them. Castro was adjudged as the MVP anew, beating Norwood. Proving himself to be a deserving grandslam MVP, he edged Reed Juntilla, Ken Bono, and Norwood in the race.

== Professional career ==
=== Singapore Slingers ===
Castro signed with the Singapore Slingers during a televised ceremony in May 2008, and was supposed to be the first Filipino player in the National Basketball League, Australia's top-level professional basketball competition. However, about a month before the start of the season, the Slingers withdrew permanently from the NBL citing excessive transport costs to Australia.

=== Talk 'N Text / TNT ===
During his championship career with the Singapore Slingers, he decided to leave the team and joined the PBA. He sent an application to the Philippine Basketball Association enabling him to be included in the draft class of the 2008 PBA Draft at Market! Market! in Bonifacio Global City, Taguig. Castro was selected as the third overall pick of the Talk 'N Text Tropang Texters courtesy of a trade that sent superstar Jay Washington to the San Miguel Beermen in exchange for the third pick that turned out to be Castro.

Recently he was awarded by the PSA to be part of the Nation's brightest stars together with Manny Pacquiao, Manny Pangilinan, Manny Villar, Kelly Williams, Nonito Donaire, Wesley So and Willy Wang. He was also awarded by the PBA to be the Mr. Quality Minutes Player of the year beating Joseph Yeo. He averaged 9.1 points, 3.5 rebounds, 3.9 assists and 1.4 steals in the 2008–09 PBA season.

The season's No. 3 draft pick was No. 7 in assists (3.9), No. 9 in assist-to-turnover ratio (1.8)

Talk N' Text won the championship against the San Miguel Beermen (4–2). He and Jimmy Alapag were titled as co-Finals MVPs.

Talk N' Text won back to back championships in the 2011 Commissioner's Cup against another San Miguel Corporation franchise the Barangay Ginebra Kings. Castro was named the Finals MVP and co-siding again with Jimmy Alapag for two consecutive conferences.

In 2015, Castro captured his sixth title with the Talk 'N Text franchise and PBA career after winning the 2015 PBA Commissioner's Cup title against Rain or Shine Elasto Painters.

On October 14, 2016, Castro was recognized during the PBA Leo Awards Night as he was named to the PBA Mythcial First Team.

== Career statistics ==
=== PBA ===
Legend
GP	Games played	MPG	Minutes per game	FG%	Field-goal percentage
3FG%	3-point field-goal percentage	4P%	4-point field-goal percentage	FT%	Free-throw percentage
RPG	Rebounds per game	APG	Assists per game	SPG	Steals per game
BPG	Blocks per game	PPG	Points per game	127	Career high

As of the end of 2024–25 season

Led the league

==== Season-by-season averages ====
Year	Team	GP	MPG	FG%	3P%	4P%	FT%	RPG	APG	SPG	BPG	PPG
2008–09	Talk 'N Text	46	24.0	.439	.330	—	.860	3.4	4.0	1.1	.3	10.0
2009–10	Talk 'N Text	48	25.3	.447	.329	—	.640	3.7	3.7	.8	.3	10.0
2010–11	Talk 'N Text	61	25.1	.382	.304	—	.757	3.9	4.1	1.0	.2	11.9
2011–12	Talk 'N Text	56	28.9	.415	.363	—	.710	3.9	3.9	.9	.1	14.7
2012–13	Talk 'N Text	53	27.8	.403	.321	—	.731	4.4	3.7	.8	.1	14.5
2013–14	Talk 'N Text	49	29.4	.404	.369	—	.788	4.0	4.2	.9	.2	16.8
2014–15	Talk 'N Text	48	32.7	.446	.420	—	.729	4.1	5.4	1.2	.2	18.5
2015–16	TNT	41	31.6	.421	.342	—	.753	4.0	6.1	1.1	.4	20.3
2016–17	TNT	54	29.9	.440	.316	—	.802	4.1	6.2	1.2	.4	16.8
2017–18	TNT	33	28.3	.388	.342	—	.844	4.5	5.6	1.4	.5	14.8
2019	TNT	51	34.7	.394	.317	—	.828	4.6	6.1	1.7	.5	15.2
2020	TNT	19	28.1	.438	.278	—	.745	3.5	5.1	1.5	.2	15.2
2021	TNT	37	24.0	.419	.286	—	.861	3.1	3.7	1.1	.3	11.0
2022–23	TNT	53	24.8	.457	.365	—	.798	3.5	3.9	1.1	.2	12.4
2023–24	TNT	22	25.1	.458	.388	—	.738	3.4	4.6	.8	.1	13.1
2024–25	TNT	35	21.2	.433	.340	.500	.764	2.6	3.6	1.0	.1	9.5
Career		706	27.8	.420	.344	.500	.769	3.9	4.6	1.1	.3	14.1

=== National team ===
Year	Team	GP	MPG	FG%	3P%	FT%	RPG	APG	SPG	BPG	PPG
2013 FIBA Asia Championship	Philippines	9	20.8	.641	.466	.941	3.3	3.0	0.7	0.2	11.8
2014 FIBA Basketball World Cup	Philippines	4	17.2	.421	.457	.833	1.2	1.2	0.5	0.0	6.5
2015 William Jones Cup	Philippines	6	24.0	.543	.344	.692	3.2	4.2	2.2	0.0	13.3
2015 FIBA Asia Championship	Philippines	9	24.4	.519	.467	.850	3.2	2.6	1.0	0.0	16.7

== National team career ==
=== Youth team ===
Castro was in the roster of the Philippine basketball youth team in 2004.

=== 2007 Southeast Asian Games ===
Castro was a part of the Philippine national team in the 2007 Southeast Asian Games basketball tournament. The Philippines won the gold medal without losing a game.

=== 2013 FIBA Asia Championship ===
Jayson Castro was part of the Philippine team who won the silver medal in the 2013 FIBA Asia Championship. He was part of the FIBA Asia Mythical Team.

Castro averaged better than 11 points in nine games for Gilas Pilipinas. He was brilliant in the last two games, scoring 17 points in the semifinal victory over South Korea and 18 in the gold medal game against Iran.

=== 2015 FIBA Asia Championship ===
Jayson Castro once again proved to be the Asia's best point guard after he was named to the Mythical Five for the second straight FIBA Asia Championship.

He has been the Gilas Pilipinas main gunner in the tournament, with his partnership with player Andray Blatche proving to be a strong duo on the offensive end.

The Philippines finished 2nd in the 2015 FIBA Asia Championship.

=== 2016 Men's Olympic Basketball Qualifier–Manila ===
Castro was among the players who made it into the Final 12 roster of Gilas Pilipinas for the Men's Olympic Basketball Qualifying Tournament held in Manila.

After the team bowed out of the competition, Castro announced on his Instagram photo that he will retire from his international career, citing the game against New Zealand will be the final game of his stint with the national basketball team.

== Honors and achievements ==
- 2004–2006 NCAA Mythical 5 Selection
- 2006–07 PBL Mythical 5 Selection
- 2006–07 PBL Most Valuable Player
- 2006–2007 PBL Showcase Skills Challenge Champion
- 2007–08 PBL Mythical 5 Selection
- 2007–2008 PBL Unity Cup Most Valuable Player
- 2007–08 PBL Silver Cup Most Valuable Player
- 2008 Brunei Cup Most Valuable Player
- 2008 Malaysia Basketball League Most Valuable Player playing for the Singapore Slingers
- 2009 Sports Digest PSA Fetes Nation's Brightest Stars Awardee
- 2009 PBA Mr. Quality Player of the Year
- 2010–2011 Philippine Cup Finals MVP
- 2010–2011 Commissioner's Cup Finals MVP
- 2010–2011 Mythical Second Team Selection
- 2010–2011 PBA Most Improved Player
- 2012–2013 Philippine Cup – Best Player of the Conference
- 2012–2013 PBA First Mythical Team
- 2014 Commissioner's Cup Best Player of the Conference
- 2015 Commissioner's Cup Best Player of the Conference
- 2013 FIBA Asia Championship Mythical All-Star Selection – Best Point Guard in Asia
- 2015 William Jones Cup Mythical Five
- 2015 FIBA Asia Championship Mythical All-Star Selection
