= Granny Goose =

American snack food brand (1946–)

- Product type: Snack foods
- Current owner: Snak King
- Country: United States
- Introduced: 1946
- Markets: United States
- Previous owners: Matthew Barr (1946–1948); Del Monte Foods (1966-1980); GF Industries Inc. (1980-1995); Keith Kim (1995–2000),

Granny Goose is an American brand of potato chips and other snack foods.

== History ==
Granny Goose Foods, Inc. was founded in Oakland, California, by Matthew Barr in 1946. In 1993, the company acquired the Laura Scudder brand from Borden, Inc., but due to intense competition from PepsiCo's Frito-Lay and Anheuser-Busch's Eagle Snacks could not make a profit. The entire company was put up for sale in 1995 by its parent company G.F. Industries, Inc..

In 2000, the company moved most of its operations from its corporate headquarters in Oakland to Kaysville, Utah. That same year, Snak King acquired Granny Goose's corn chip, tortilla chip, popcorn, potato chip and extruded snack lines.

The Granny Goose potato chip line is produced by Shearer's Foods under license from Snak King. Granny Goose products can be readily found in the Western United States.

In the Philippines, Granny Goose was known for its Tortillos and Kornets corn-based snacks manufactured by General Milling Corporation (GMC) under license from Granny Goose Foods Inc. since 1982. GMC would later acquire the trademark rights for the Philippines. In May 10, 2008, Universal Robina Corporation acquired the Granny Goose snack business of GMC.

== Mascot and advertising ==
Its logo and mascot, also named Granny Goose, is an anthropomorphic cartoon goose. In a series of television commercials first aired in the 1960s, the company's spokesperson, who self-identified as "Granny Goose", was portrayed by actor Philip Carey as an ultra-masculine tough guy, depicted in the commercials as such manly stereotypes as a cowboy or a James Bond-style spy.

== Products ==
- Original Potato Chips
- Dip Potato Chips
- Sour Cream & Onion Potato Chips
- BBQ Potato Chips
- Onion Rings
- Corn Chips
- White Corn Tortilla Strips
- Restaurant Style Tortilla Chips
- Nacho Cheese Tortilla Chips
- Butter Popcorn
- Kettle Corn
- Cheese Popcorn
- Caramel Corn
- Jalapeño Cheddar Popcorn
- Cheese Puffs
- Cheese Nibbles
- Blazin' Hot Cheese Nibbles
- Ring Pretzels (discontinued)
- Tortillos (Philippines)
- Kornets (Philippines, discontinued)

== See also ==
- Pringles
- Junk food
