= Koy Banal =

Filipino basketball coach

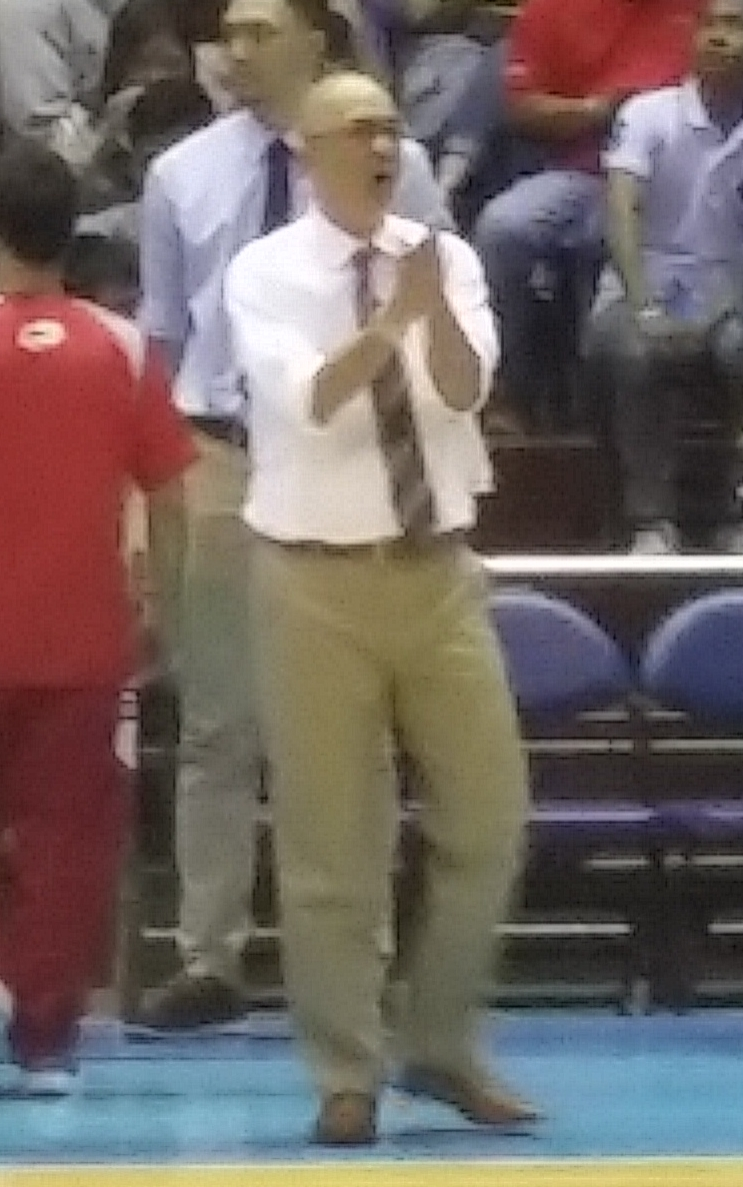

Career information
- College: San Beda
- Playing career: 1998–2016

Career history

Coaching
- 1998–1999: Pasig Pirates (assistant)
- 2000–2004: FEU
- 2004–2009: Magnolia Purewater Wizards
- 2005–2006: San Beda
- 2006–2012: B-Meg Llamados (assistant)
- 2011–2013: Arellano
- 2013–2014: Petron Blaze Boosters (assistant)
- 2014–2016: Barako Bull Energy
- 2016: Phoenix Fuel Masters

Career highlights
- As head coach: 2× UAAP champion (2003, 2004*); NCAA Philippines champion (2006); NCAA Philippines Coach of the Year (2006); As assistant coach: 2× PBA champion (2009–10 Philippine, 2012 Commissioner's)

Enrico "Koy" Banal, is a Filipino former professional basketball coach.

== Coaching career ==
Played as a Red Lion in his college days, Banal has had extensive head coaching experience in the collegiate and amateur ranks. He called the shots for the PSBA Jaguars in the late 90s with ex-pro Warren Ybañez as his main man. From 2000-2004, he was the head coach of the FEU Tamaraws in the UAAP, bannered by future PBA MVP Arwind Santos, Denok Miranda, Mark Isip, Cesar Catli. He won two championships for FEU from 2003 to 2004 (Due to La Salle's ineligible players which led them to give up the 2004 championship trophy due to the scandal that leaked out the following year and forfeiting all their wins from 2003-2005).

Midway through the 2005 NCAA season, he was hired as head coach of his alma mater, San Beda Red Lions, and in 2006, he guided the team to their first championship after 28 years. He was awarded as Coach of the Year. Citing differences with the management, he was unceremoniously dumped as head coach of the Red Lions in 2007.

He then jumped to the pros as an assistant coach to Ryan Gregorio at Purefoods, and back in the collegiate ranks in 2011, coaching Arellano University. After his stint at Arellano in 2013, he was appointed assistant coach to Siot Tanquincen and was then promoted to head coach a day before the start of the 2014-15 PBA season replacing Tanquincen. On May 31, 2016, Banal was fired by the Phoenix Fuel Masters after rumors emerged that Banal was going to return to one of the teams San Miguel Corporation owned (Barangay Ginebra San Miguel, San Miguel Beermen, and Star Hotshots). He was replaced by former Westports Malaysia Dragons Ariel Vanguardia.

To this date, he is one of only a handful of coaches to win championships in both UAAP and NCAA.

== Coaching record ==
=== Collegiate record ===
Season	Team	Elimination round					Playoffs				
Season	Team	GP	W	L	PCT	Finish	GP	W	L	PCT	Results
2000	FEU	14	9	5	.643	3rd	4	2	2	.500	Runners-up
2001	FEU	14	8	6	.571	3rd	1	0	1	.000	Semifinals
2002	FEU	14	6	8	.429	5th	—	—	—	—	Eliminated
2003	FEU	14	11	3	.786	2nd	4	4	0	1.000	Champions
2004	FEU	14	11	3	.786	1st	4	2	2	.500	Champions^{a}
2005	SBC	7	3	4	.429	7th	—	—	—	—	Eliminated
2006	SBC	14	13	1	.929	1st	4	3	1	.750	Champions
2012	AU	18	6	12	.333	8th	—	—	—	—	Eliminated
2013	AU	18	8	10	.444	6th	—	—	—	—	Eliminated
Totals		127	75	52	.590	—	17	11	6	.647	3 championships

^{a}Won over UE in the semifinals, lost to La Salle in the finals. The 2004 championship was later awarded to FEU by technicality.

=== PBA ===
Season	Conference	Team	Elimination round					Playoffs				
Season	Conference	Team	GP	W	L	PCT	Finish	GP	W	L	PCT	Results
2014–15	Philippine Cup	Barako Bull	11	4	7	.364	9th	1	0	1	.000	Quarterfinals (1st phase)
2014–15	Commissioner's Cup	Barako Bull	11	5	6	.455	7th	1	0	1	.000	Quarterfinals
2014–15	Governors' Cup	Barako Bull	11	6	5	.545	6th	1	0	1	.000	Quarterfinals
2015–16	Philippine Cup	Barako Bull	11	5	6	.455	8th	1	0	1	.000	Quarterfinals (1st phase)
2015–16	Commissioner's Cup	Phoenix	11	3	8	.273	11th	–	–	–	–	Eliminated
Career total			55	23	32	.418	Playoff total	4	0	4	.000	0 championship

== Personal life ==
Banal is the younger brother of former PBA, UAAP and NCAA coach Joel Banal and has a son Jonathan Banal, a former point guard for the Mapúa Cardinals in the NCAA.

Preceded by Danny Gavieres	FEU Tamaraws men's basketball head coach 2000–2004	Succeeded by Bert Flores
Preceded by Nash Racela	San Beda Red Lions men's basketball head coach 2005–2006	Succeeded by Frankie Lim
Preceded by Leo Isaac	Arellano Chiefs men's basketball head coach 2011–2013	Succeeded by Jerry Codiñera
Preceded by Siot Tanquincen	Barako Bull Energy Head Coach; 2014–2016	Succeeded by team renamed as Phoenix Fuel Masters
