= Jojo Tangkay =

Filipino basketball player (born 1976)

Personal information
- Born: November 26, 1976 (age 49) Aloguinsan, Cebu, Philippines
- Listed height: 6 ft 2 in (1.88 m)
- Listed weight: 190 lb (86 kg)

Career information
- College: Southwestern University
- PBA draft: 2001: 1st round, 16th overall pick
- Drafted by: Sta. Lucia Realtors
- Playing career: 2001–2008, 2018–2021
- Position: Shooting guard

Career history
- 2001: Sta. Lucia Realtors
- 2002: Talk N' Text Phone Pals
- 2006–2008: Welcoat Dragons
- 2018–2019: Basilan Steel
- 2021: ARQ Builders–Lapu-Lapu City Heroes

Career highlights
- PBA champion (2001 Governors'); MPBL All-Star (2019); PBL champion (2005 Unity); PBL Most Valuable Player (2005-06 Heroes); 4× PBL Mythical First Team (2003-04 Platinum, 2004 Unity, 2005-06 Heroes, 2006 Unity)

Jercules "Jojo" Tangkay (born November 26, 1976) is a Filipino former professional basketball player. He was drafted 16th overall by the Sta. Lucia Realtors in the 2001 PBA draft.

== Career ==
Tangkay made the roster of Southwestern University Cobras on his freshman year after he offered to try out with them. He became the Cebu Amateurs Athletic Association's MVP in 2000. He was drafted 16th overall by Sta. Lucia Realtors in 2001. However, his height hindered his development and affected his playing time with the team. In 2002, he was signed by the Talk 'N Text Phone Pals, but only played 14 games before he was released.

Disappointed by his failure to make a breakthrough in the PBA, Tangkay signed a contract with Welcoat Paint Masters in the Philippine Basketball League to resurrect his career. He became one of the league's superstars and earned two MVP awards.

When Welcoat acquired the PBA's Shell franchise in 2006, he was re-signed for a new contract to play in the PBA after a great season with them in the semi-professional league. In 2008, he was waived by the team.

He played with M. Lhuillier Cebu Ninos of Liga Pilipinas.
