= Toyota-Otis Sparks =

- Leagues: Philippine Basketball League
- Founded: 2004
- Dissolved: 2010
- History: Toyota Otis-Letran; 2004-2006; Toyota Balintawak Road Kings; 2006-2008; Toyota Otis Sparks; 2008-2010
- Location: Philippines
- Team colors: Red, White, Navy blue
Home	Away

The Toyota-Otis Sparks were a basketball team in the Philippine Basketball League from 2004 until the league became dormant after 2010. The team was owned by Toyota Otis, Inc., a Toyota automotive dealership based in Manila.

== History ==
In 2003, R.A. Oben Holdings, Inc., headed by Reginaldo "Rey" Oben, acquired the Nutri-licious franchise. It was then announced that Toyota Otis-Letran would be the Philippine Basketball League's eighth team for the 2004 season and the first in league history to be affiliated with an NCAA school. Their first team was composed of Letran Knights players Ronjay Enrile, Joanthan Aldave, Aaron Aban and Boyet Bautista, who had just won the Season 79 title.

== Final roster ==
Toyota-Tigers
Head coach: Ariel Vanguardia
SF	2	Mark Canlas	Santo Tomas
PG	4	John Quioc	De La Salle Calunbang
G	6	John Gran	San Lorenzo
PG	1	Julian Ross Bermejo	San Sebastian
PF	8	Erick Rodriguez	San Juan de Letran
C	21	Eric Garcia	De La Salle
F	12	Ryan Dela Cruz	EAC
F	24	Floyd Dedicatoria	Jose Rizal
C	5	Jason Pascual	Mapua
SF	18	Mark Meneses	De La Salle
F	19	Jonathan Aldave	San Juan de Letran
G	20	RJ Jazul	San Juan de Letran
G	24	John Sala	CEU
C	30	James Garcia	AMA
(C) - Captain, (I) - Import, (R) - Reserve			Toyota-Otis Sparks

Other people

- Assistant coaches: Lito F. Vergara, Franco A. Atienza, John A. Aquino
- Trainer: Giner Reyes
- Physical Therapist: Rey M. Rasalan
- Team manager: Jun Santos
- Board Representative: Virgilio F. Garcia

== Former coaches and players ==
- Louie Alas (2004–2006, coach)
- Mark Andaya
- Joe Devance
- Johnathan Aldave
- Boyet Bautista
- Ronjay Enrile
