= Magnolia Purewater Wizards =

- Leagues: Philippine Basketball League
- Founded: 1983
- History: Lagerlite Beermen; 1985; Magnolia Ice Cream; 1983-1984, 1986-1992; Instafood Meal Masters; 1993-1994; Magnolia Cheezee Spread; 1995-1996; Wilkins Distilled Drinking Water; 1998; Viva Mineral Water; 2004; FEU-Magnolia Ice Cream Wizards; 2004-2006; Magnolia Ice Cream Spinners; 2006-2007; San Miguel-Magnolia Beverage Masters; 2007; San Mig Coffee Kings; 2007-2008; Magnolia Purewater Wizards; 2008-2009
- Location: Philippines
- Team colors: Blue, White
- Head coach: Enrico Banal
- Championships: PBL (9): *1986 Founder's Cup; *1987 Maharlika Cup; *1988 Freedom Cup; *1989 Invitational Cup; *1989 Maharlika Cup; *1990 Maharlika Cup; *1994 Invitational Cup; *2004 Unity Cup; *2005-2006 Heroes Cup
- Website: PBL website
Home	Away

The Magnolia Purewater Wizards was the final name of a basketball franchise owned by San Miguel Corporation (SMC) that played in the Philippine Basketball League from 1983 to 2009. It played under various brand names owned by SMC - Lagerlite (1985), Magnolia Ice Cream (1983–1984, 1986–1992, 2004–2007), Instafood (1993–1994), Magnolia Cheezee Spread (1995–1996), Wilkins (1998), Viva (2004), Magnolia Beverage (2007), San Mig Coffee (2007–2008) and Magnolia PureWater (2008–2009).

== Current roster ==
Magnolia Purewater Wizards
Head coach: Enrico Banal
G	0	John Paul Alcaraz	Letran
G	1	Leo Losentes	St. Francis of Assisi
G	3	Edwin Torres
F	6	Al Magpayo	St. Benilde
SF	7	Mark Balneg	Letran
F	10	Eder John Saldua	FEU
G	11	Liztian Amparado	PCU
F	12	Marvin Hayes	JRU
C	13	Ford Arao	Ateneo
F	14	Khasim Mirza	UST
F	15	Neil Pascual	Mapua
C	17	Chester Taylor	UST
PG	18	Marcy Arellano	UE
F	23	Ogie Menor	San Beda
F	24	Mel Gile	UST
F	25	Neil Raneses	Visayas
F	33	Dylan Ababou	UST
(C) - Captain, (I) - Import			Magnolia Purewater Wizards

Other people

- Assistant coaches: Chito Victolero , Beaujing Acot, Joel Anthony Co, Manny Capales, Rey Evangelista
- Utilities: Terry Sanchez, Manuel Vilbar, Ruel Lopes, Abraham Lagare
- Physical Therapist: Benjamin Palarca
- Team manager: Peter Martin
- Governor Representative: Joaquin Loyzaga

== Notable coaches ==
- Derrick Pumaren (1983–1990)
- Franz Pumaren (1991–1992)
- Francis Rodriguez (1993–1994)
- Jong Uichico (1994–1996)
- Arlene Rodriguez (1998)
- Koy Banal (2004–2009)
