= Philippine Basketball League =

Semi-professional Filipino basketball league

- Sport: Basketball
- Founded: May 6, 1983
- Folded: 2011
- Motto: The Future Is Now; The Faster League; Where The Future Begins; Ito Ang Tunay na Ligang Bayan
- Country: Philippines

The Philippine Basketball League (PBL) was a commercial semi-professional basketball league in the Philippines. The league was composed of several commercial teams with several collegiate and provincial stars.

== History ==
The PBL was formed on May 6, 1983, a brainchild of San Miguel Corporation chairman Danding Cojuangco, under its original name the Philippine Amateur Basketball League (PABL). It was the successor of the defunct Manila Industrial and Commercial Athletic Association (MICAA), which folded during the early-1980s. During the inaugural PABL tournament, 37 teams divided into four divisions from collegiate and commercial ranks participated in the tournament that was played in the historic Rizal Memorial Coliseum. De La Salle University emerged champion in the league's dry-run.

Towards the end of 1983, 16 teams founded the PABL and the league held its first official tourney, the Founder's Cup. Arellano University was the champion of the tournament. During their second year in 1984, three PABL tournaments were held: the Ambassador's Cup won by Development Bank of Rizal, the President's Cup and the Invitationals, the two latter won by ESQ Marketing.

In 1985, the PABL scored a big breakthrough. Faced with an economic crisis, the league was able to get the sponsorship of San Miguel Corporation. Eighteen teams joined the 1st SMC-sponsored Invitationals with ESQ Marketing winning its third straight title against a strong Lagerlite crew. With the tremendous success of the tournament, San Miguel again agreed to be the sole sponsor of the second PABL conference that year, won by Army Jungle Fighters, dubbed as the "Challenge to Champions", Sixteen teams saw action. The cast included 12 commercial teams and 4 collegiate squads especially the NCAA and UAAP champions, San Sebastian College and University of the East.

In the 1990s, the league was renamed as the Philippine Basketball League under Andy Jao, who would later return to the broadcasting panel of the PBA coverage on Vintage Sports. Jao's replacement, Charlie Favis later adopted a new theme, calling the PBL as the "faster league". Yeng Guiao replaced Favis, when Guiao left the coaching ranks. The league gained early success with the dominance of the Tanduay Rhum Masters, the arrival of Eric Menk and Asi Taulava, and the holding PBL games at the air-conditioned Makati Coliseum.

In 2000, former Vintage Sports commentator Chino Trinidad replaced Guiao, when the commissioner resigned to coach Red Bull in the Philippine Basketball Association, the country's premier professional basketball league. The PBL's popularity grew, inviting commercial teams bannered by single collegiate teams, and the league also gained a stable broadcast partner in Studio 23 (now S+A). In 2007, PBL broke away from Studio 23 and signed an agreement with cable channel Basketball TV to broadcast the games. Chino Trinidad announced in March 2010 that he would be retiring as commissioner of the PBL and said he would be focusing his career as correspondent of GMA Network. Eventually, Trinidad left GMA in 2023.

Through an agreement between the PBL and the Liga Pilipinas, a joint tournament was held in June 2010. The agreement was made as dry-run of a proposed "Developmental League", which was initiated by the Philippine Basketball Association, just like NBA's D-League. The tournament was to be named "Tournament of the Philippines". Tournament of the Philippines started June 9, 2010, and used the Liga Pilipinas' home-and-away leg format with 9 teams involved, 3 from the PBL and 6 from Liga Pilipinas. M.Lhuillier Kwarta Padala-Cebu Ninos became the 1st (and last) TOP champions by defeating Misamis Oriental Meteors, 3–2. After the tournament, merger talks between the 2 leagues went sour and were put off for good. The Philippine Basketball Association then announced that they would organize instead the "PBA Developmental League", or the PBA D-League, on their own after merger talks between PBL and Liga Pilipinas failed.

In 2011, the PBL's board of governors named Nolan Bernardino, son of former PBA commissioner Emilio "Jun" Bernardino, as the new PBL commissioner, while Sports Vision, the company behind the success of Shakey's V-League, was named as the group that would handle PBL's day-to-day operations. However, the league experienced great difficulty finding six teams for the 2011 opening tournament when four of the teams that had earlier confirmed their participation jumped ship to the PBA D-League, namely Pharex, Agri Nurture-FCA, Cafe France and Cobra Energy Drink. PBL Commissioner Nolan Bernardino said he had already been informed of the matter and that he respected the transferring teams' decisions. This resulted in the PBL being disbanded.

== PABL teams in the 1980s ==
- Boogie Jeans / Boogie Barnes
- Cine Suerte
- Customs - MCDC
- Davao All-Stars
- De La Salle Green Archers
- Fariñas Transit
- Glenmore Shoes
- Helsinki Shirtwear
- Maisagana Corn Growers
- Manhattan Shirts / Country Fair Foodmakers
- Roxas Security Corporation (ROSECOR)
- Sampaguita Garments
- Southern Textile Mills
- Arellano Flaming Arrows
- Development Bank of Rizal
- ESQ Marketing / ESQ - Sta. Lucia
- Magnolia Ice Cream / Lagerlite Beer / Magnolia Juice Drink
- Masagana 99
- Perpetual Savings Bank / Bayside
- RFM-Swift Hotdogs / Swift Squeeze Juice Drinks
- Coal Fields
- CF Sharp
- Army Jungle Fighters
- Concrete Aggregates Corp. / CAC Power Blocks
- Equipment Research Development Corporation (ERDC)
- Imperial Textile Mills
- Crispa - Arellano
- Golden Rice Cereals
- Rizal Provincial Athletic Club / Rizal Athletic Club
- Mama's Love
- Philippine Youth Health and Sports (PYHS) / Fuji Soy Sauce
- Adamson Soaring Falcons
- FEU Tamaraws
- NU Bulldogs
- San Beda Red Lions
- San Sebastian Stags
- UP Fighting Maroons / Converse - Milkland
- UST Growling Tigers
- Ateneo Blue Eagles
- UE Red Warriors
- Letran Knights
- Perpetual Altas
- UM Hawks
- NCBA Wildcats
- Hope Cigarettes
- Lhuillier Jewelers / Crispa - Lhuillier / Converse - Lhuillier
- Purefoods Food Experts
- Philips Sardines
- Sta. Lucia Realtors
- YCO Shine Masters
- MIESCOR Builders
- Converse All-Stars
- Lady's Choice
- AFPSLAI Troopers
- Agfa Color Films
- Burger City
- Crispa Redmanizers
- Silver Horizon
- Shakey's - Baguio
- Pampanga All-Stars
- United Bicolanos
- Marsman Plantation - Davao
- El Rancho Meat Loaf - Cebu
- Asia Overseas Transport
- Dansei Groom Shop

=== Notable Guest Teams ===
- Golden Dragon (Taiwan)
  (1986 Filipino Cup, 1987 International Invitational Cup)
- Hyundai Motors (South Korea)
  (1987 International Invitational Cup)
- Clark Pacific All-Stars
  (1987 International Invitational Cup)
- RFM-Swift - US NCAA All-Stars
  (1987 Philippine Cup Champions)
- Philips Sardines-RP Team
  (1987 Philippine Cup 1st Runner-Up)
- Shanghai (China)
  (1987 Philippine Cup)
- Egypt
  (1987 Philippine Cup)
- Isuzu Motors (Japan)
  (1988 International Invitational Cup)
- University of British Columbia (Canada)
  (1988 International Invitational Cup)
- Pelita Jaya (Indonesia)
  (1988 International Invitational Cup)
- McDonald's (Taiwan)
  (1988 Maharlika Cup)
- Tera Electronics (Taiwan)
  (1989 Invitational Cup)

== PBL teams in the 1990s ==
- Agfa Color XRG / Red Bull Energy Drink / Agfa HDC Film / Batang Red Bull
- Burger City / Burger Machine
- Crispa 400 / Crispa White Cement
- Magnolia Ice Cream / Instafood Mealmasters / Magnolia Cheezee Spread
- Philips Sardines / A&W Rootbears / A&W Hamburger Pioneers
- Sta. Lucia Realtors / Otto Shoes
- Sarsi Bottlers / Swift Hotdogs / New Pop Cola / Rica Hotdogs / Carol Ann's Snack Masters
- Mama's Love / Casino Rubbing Alcohol
- RC Cola
- Triple-V Foodmasters
- Serg's Candies
- JCT-Evertex
- Nikon Home Appliances / Nikon Electric Fan
- Chowking Fastfood Kings / Chowking Oriental Fastfood
- Kutitap Cavity Fighters / Hapee Toothpaste / Dazz Dishwashing Liquid
- Stag Pale Pilseners / Tanduay Rhum Masters / Tanduay Centennial Rhum / Colt 45
- Ramcar Oriental Battery / Super Power Battery
- Welcoat Paints
- Springmaid Flak Eliminators / Springmaid Toothbrush
- AMA Cybertigers
- Wilkins Mineral Water
- Doctor J Rubbing Alcohol - ANA Water Dispenser
- Zest-O Juice Drink
- Kendi Mint
- Chaz Perfume
- Blu Detergent
- Paralux Auto Paints
- Boom Laundry Master
- Montaña Jewels

=== Notable Guest Teams ===
- Atlanta PVC Pipes - Fil-Am Selection
  (1992 Invitational Cup)
- Cebuana Lhuillier - Fil-Am California
  (1994 International Invitational Cup)
- Yakult - China
  (1994 International Invitational Cup)
- Boysen Paints - Industrial Bank of Korea
  (1995 International Invitational Cup)
- Budweiser Kings (Guam)
  (1995 International Invitational Cup)
- Hapee Toothpaste - Ozeta Club (Slovakia)
  (1995 International Invitational Cup)

=== Selection teams ===
- Andok's – PBL selection team which won the 1995 ABC Champions Cup.

== PBL teams in the 2000s ==
- ANA Freezers
- Blu Detergent Kings / GIV Beauty Soap / Blu Sun Power
- Dazz Dishwashing Gel / Hapee Toothpaste / Kutitap Toothpaste / Fash Liquid Detergent / Hapee-PCU Teeth Sparklers / Hapee Complete Protectors / Licealiz Shampoo Hair Doctors
- Montaña Pawnshop Jewels
- Shark Energy Drink Power Boosters / Regent Cheese Balls - Shark
- Welcoat Paintmasters / Rain or Shine Elasto Painters / Welcoat Paints-St. Benilde
- Ateneo-Hapee-Nenaco / Addict Mobile - Ateneo / Lee Pipes - Ateneo / Ateneo - Pioneer Insurance
- ICTSI - La Salle / Osaka Iridology - La Salle
- Bingo Pilipino Milyonaryo
- PharmaQuick
- John O Juzz / John O Senators
- LBC - Batangas Blades
- Kettle Korn - UST Pop Kings / Sunkist - UST
- Sunkist Juice Drink - Pampanga
- Nutrilicious Juicers
- Toyota-Otis Sparks - Letran / Toyota-Balintawak Road Kings
- Granny Goose Tortillos
- Air Philippines
- Harbour Centre Batang Pier / Oracle Residences
- Negros Navigation - San Beda
- Bacchus Energy Drink Raiders / Cobra Energy Drink Iron Men
- Far Eastern Insurance
- Mail and More Comets / Burger King Whoppers / Burger King Stunners
- TeleTech Titans
- Henkel Sista Super Sealers
- Cebuana Lhuillier Pera Padala Moneymen
- Pharex Bidang Generix / ASCOF Lagundi Cough Busters
- Viva Mineral Water - FEU / Magnolia Ice Cream - FEU / San Miguel-Magnolia Beverage Masters / San Mig Coffee Kings / Magnolia Purewater Wizards
- Philippines men's national basketball team
- Philippines men's national under-18 basketball team
  (Burlington-RP Youth Team)
  (Nokia-RP Youth Team)
- Noosa Shoes Stars
- Pharex B-Complex - UP Fighting Maroons
- AddMix Transformers - Adamson Soaring Falcons
- Excel Roof 25ers - San Sebastian Stags
- Agri Nurture Inc. - FCA Cultivators
- Fern-C Ferntastics
- Cossack Blue Spirits - UE Red Warriors

== Media ==
Beginning the 2007 season, the PBL games were seen on Basketball TV (a channel of the Solar family of cable networks) after several years of being shown on UHF television station Studio 23. Games were televised every Tuesdays, Thursdays, and Saturdays from 5-9 pm Philippine time plus rebroadcasts on BTV in the wee hours of the morning. RPN also had a delayed telecast of Tuesday's second game, but this was moved to IBC on Saturdays, until the season-ending 2008 Lipovitan Amino Sports Cup. The coverage eventually returned to RPN named as C/S 9. The telecast of the games were live but the other games were delayed subject to prior coverage of the games until 2010.

Prior to BTV, previous broadcasters included ABS-CBN Corporation, People's Television Network, Silverstar Sports, Solar Sports and Vintage Television, as the games were usually put on airtime slots. With ABS-CBN, the league initially forged a deal in 2003 as a blocktimer, then in 2004 renewed ties to make ABS-CBN Sports its official TV producer/coverer and Studio 23 its official carrying station of the games.

DZSR Sports Radio 918 kHz, a government station, had been airing the PBL games on radio since the start of the PABL back in the mid-1980s.

In 2002, the league opened its official website, myPBL.com, powered by E-Highway. In 2007, the website transferred to a new address at PhilippineBasketballLeague.org with the alternate address, PBL.org.ph. These sites are now defunct.

== Broadcast partners of the PBL ==
- PTV 4=NBN 4 (1986–1990, 1995–1999, 2000–2003)
- Islands TV 13/IBC 13 (1991–1994, 1999–2000)
- Solar Sports (2002–2003)
- Studio 23 (2003–2007)
- Basketball TV (2007–2010)

== The PBL and the Philippine Basketball Association ==
The Philippine Basketball Association, the premier basketball league in the country, has a special relationship with the PBL; several teams in the PBL are owned by companies also having PBA teams (such as San Miguel Corporation's PBL team is San Mig Coffee, with SMC also owning 3 PBA teams). The PBL is also one of the leagues where the PBA gets their players. Even quite a few successful PBL teams transferred to the PBA (although a system of promotion and relegation is not practiced in the Philippines), such as Purefoods, Sta. Lucia, Red Bull, and Welcoat.

== Commissioners ==
- Jose "Joe" Pavia (1983–1984)
- Mauricio Martelino (1985–1989)
- Andy Jao (1990–1991)
- Ogie Narvasa (1991–1993)
- Philip Juico (1993–1994)
- Charlie Favis (1994–1996)
- Yeng Guiao (1997–2000)
- Chino Trinidad (2000–2010)
- Nolan Bernardino (2011)

== See also ==
- Women's Philippine Basketball League
- PBA D-League
