= 2011 PBA Governors' Cup finals =

Basketball championship series

2011 PBA Governors Cup finals
| Team | Coach | Wins |
|---|---|---|
| (2) Petron Blaze | Ato Agustin | 4 |
| (1) Talk 'N Text | Chot Reyes | 3 |
- Dates: August 7–21, 2011
- MVP: Arwind Santos (Petron Blaze)
- Television: Solar Sports (Studio 23), BTV
- Announcers: See broadcast notes
- Radio network: DZRJ-AM

Referees
- Game 1: A. Herrera, J. Mariano, R. Yante
- Game 2: N. Quilinguen, P. Balao, J. Mariano
- Game 3: A. Herrera, J. Mariano, R. Yante
- Game 4: N. Quilinguen, P. Balao, S. Pineda
- Game 5: P. Balao, J. Mariano, R. Yante
- Game 6: N. Quilinguen, S. Pineda, R. Yante
- Game 7: A. Herrera, S. Pineda, R. Yante

PBA Governors Cup finals chronology
- < 2002 2012 >

PBA finals chronology
- < 2011 Commissioner's 2011–12 Philippine >

The 2011 PBA Governors Cup finals was the best-of-7 championship series of the 2011 PBA Governors Cup, and the conclusion of the conference's playoffs. The Petron Blaze Boosters defeated the Talk 'N Text Tropang Texters in seven games to win their 19th Philippine Basketball Association (PBA) championship and prevented Talk 'N Text from winning the Grand Slam. Arwind Santos was named the finals MVP.

== Background ==
=== Road to the finals ===
| Petron Blaze | | Talk 'N Text |
|---|---|---|
| Finished 5–3 (0.625)—Tied for 2nd* | Elimination round | Finished 6–2 (0.750)—1st |
| Finished 8–5 (0.625)—Tied for 2nd** | Semifinals | Finished 9–4 (0.692)—1st |

*+10 in overall point differential over Alaska's +5 and Barangay Ginebra's −15
**+13 in overall point differential over Alaska's +6 and Barangay Ginebra's −19

The Talk 'N Text Tropang Texters were the first team to clinch a finals berth after defeating the Barangay Ginebra Kings on July 31 with a game to spare. The Petron Blaze Boosters, which will advance to the finals with a win over Talk 'N Text and a Ginebra win over the Rain or Shine Elasto Painters, blew out the Texters on August 5, while Ginebra defeated Rain or Shine on the following game. Petron was tied for second place with Ginebra and the Alaska Aces but advanced due to a superior quotient. However, several fans were dismayed over the quotient system, arguing that playoff games should have been held instead of determining finalists via the quotient system. Petron were seen as the underdog in the finals as they had lost four key players to injuries while Talk 'N Text has a deep lineup.

Talk 'N Text, which has won the first two championships of the season, is seeking to win the first Grand Slam since 1996 PBA season when the Alaska won all three conference championships.

== Series summary ==
| Team | Game 1 | Game 2 | Game 3 | Game 4 | Game 5 | Game 6 | Game 7 | Wins |
|---|---|---|---|---|---|---|---|---|
| Petron Blaze | 89 | 85 | 105 | 105 | 93 | 78 | 85 | 4 |
| Talk 'N Text | 88 | 103 | 132 | 83 | 80 | 104 | 73 | 3 |
| Venue | Araneta | Tubod | Araneta | Araneta | Araneta | Araneta | Araneta |

=== Game 1 ===
Solar

August 7
7:00 p.m.

boxscores

Petron Blaze Boosters 89, Talk 'N Text Tropang Texters 88
Scoring by quarter: 32–40, 19–15, 16–19, 22–14
| Pts: Sunday Salvacion 19; Rebs: Anthony Grundy 13; Asts: Anthony Grundy 12 | Pts: Jimmy Alapag 18; Rebs: Kelly Williams 9 Asts: Jimmy Alapag 7 |
Petron Blaze leads series, 1–0

Smart Araneta Coliseum, Quezon City
Referees: A. Herrera, J. Mariano, R. Yante

Talk 'N Text was leading by a point when they turned the ball over on an inbound pass. Petron's Arwind Santos, who had 12 points in the game, stole the ball and passed it to Danny Ildefonso in a fastbreak attempt. Ildefonso scored on a lay-up to give Petron the lead with 17.4 seconds remaining. On their offensive set, Jimmy Alapag found Ryan Reyes underneath the basket who scored with 10.1 seconds left. Anthony Grundy waited for the final seconds then was doubled; he passed the ball to Ildefonso who scored a 15-foot jump shot to give Petron an upset Game 1 win. The highlight of the game was Mark Yee's foul on Anthony Grundy, when he grabbed Grundy's behind twice before the officials called for a foul.

=== Game 2 ===
Solar

August 10
7:00 p.m.

boxscores

Petron Blaze Boosters 85, Talk 'N Text Tropang Texters 103
Scoring by quarter: 27–19, 21–22, 17–30, 20–32
| Pts: Santos 29; Rebs: Santos 15; Asts: Grundy 8 | Pts: Castro 24; Rebs: Williams 9 Asts: Reynolds 7 |
Series tied, 1–1

Mindanao Civic Center Gymnasium, Tubod, Lanao del Norte
Referees: N. Quilinguen, P. Balao, J. Mariano

In a game held at Tubod, Lanao del Norte, Ali Peek and Mark Yee from Talk 'N Text and Petron's Jojo Duncil were ejected after figuring in a melee at the middle of the second quarter. Petron, which was leading up to that point, relinquished the lead and effectively lost the game in the third quarter when the Texters started a scoring run, thus tying the series at 1–all.

=== Game 3 ===
Solar

August 12
7:00 p.m.

boxscores

Petron Blaze Boosters 105, Talk 'N Text Tropang Texters 132
Scoring by quarter: 24–24, 28–39, 18–40, 35–29
| Pts: Grundy 26; Rebs: Salvacion, Santos 7 Asts: Grundy 4 | Pts: Castro 23; Rebs: Fonacier 7 Asts: Castro 10 |
Talk 'N Text leads series, 2–1

Smart Araneta Coliseum, Quezon City
Referees: A. Herrera, J. Mariano, R. Yante

Prior to the game, Petron's Arwind Santos was named Best Player of the Conference, while Rain or Shine's Arizona Reid was awarded as the Best Import. Santos nosed out Mark Caguioa, Jayson Castro, Sonny Thoss, James Yap and Solomon Mercado, while Reid's closest competitor was Alaska's Jason Forte.

Petron was leading 20–9 when Castro and Larry Fonacier scored majority of their points in the first half to help Talk 'N Text pull away. Castro scored 21 of his 23 points in the first half, while Fonacier scored all of his 16 points in the opening half. The Texters, who had a 67% field goal percentage, even led by 41 points at the beginning of the fourth quarter. Talk 'N Text coach Chot Reyes revealed in the post-game press conference that Petron coach Ato Agustin challenged him to a fistfight after the game. Agustin denied that he challenged Reyes to a fistfight but the Talk 'N Text coach insisted he heard Agustin challenging him.

=== Game 4 ===
Solar

August 14
7:30 p.m.

boxscores

Petron Blaze Boosters 105, Talk 'N Text Tropang Texters 83
Scoring by quarter: 23–29, 30–21, 33–12, 19–21
| Pts: Santos 20; Rebs: Santos 14; Asts: Grundy 8 | Pts: Castro 17; Rebs: Williams 8 Asts: Castro 6 |
Series tied, 2–2

Smart Araneta Coliseum, Quezon City
Referees: N. Quilinguen, P. Balao, S. Pineda

In the annual awards ceremony held prior to the game, Talk 'N Text's Jimmy Alapag defeated Petron's Arwind Santos in the Most Valuable Player race, while Petron's injured center Rabeh Al-Hussaini was named Rookie of the Year.

While at the first half, both teams never led by a big margin, Petron had a 31–8 run at the beginning of the third quarter to post their largest margin of the series at 84–58. In that run, Grundy scored 11 of his 16 points, meanwhile Alex Cabagnot scored 16 points in the game, while Santos scored 20 points, an improvement over his three-point performance in Game 3.

=== Game 5 ===
Solar

August 17
7:00 p.m.

boxscores

Petron Blaze Boosters 93, Talk 'N Text Tropang Texters 80
Scoring by quarter: 19–9, 28–29, 26–20, 20–22
| Pts: Grundy 26; Rebs: Santos 14; Asts: Grundy 6 | Pts: Reyes 14; Rebs: Peek 10; Asts: de Ocampo 6 |
Petron Blaze leads series, 3–2

Smart Araneta Coliseum, Quezon City
Referees: P. Balao, J. Mariano, R. Yante

Prior to the game, Jayson Castro was sidelined due to an injury to his medial collateral ligament (MCL). Petron led 47–38 at the first half, then maintaining the 11-point lead at halftime. Ryan Reyes and Jimmy Alapag had poor games, scoring eight points each while Scottie Reynolds only scored three points, while his Petron counterpart Anthony Grundy posted a game-high 26 points. Alapag, who had only two turnovers in the finals, turned the ball over three times in the game.

=== Game 6 ===
Solar

August 19
7:00 p.m.

boxscores

Petron Blaze Boosters 78, Talk 'N Text Tropang Texters 104
Scoring by quarter: 23–31, 20–24, 15–23, 20–26
| Pts: Santos 19; Rebs: Santos 14; Asts: Cabagnot 8 | Pts: de Ocampo 21; Rebs: Baker 11; Asts: Alapag 10 |
Series tied, 3–3

Smart Araneta Coliseum, Quezon City
Referees: N. Quilinguen, S. Pineda, R. Yante

Prior to the game, Talk 'N Text reactivated their original import Maurice Baker, replacing Scottie Reynolds who had been ineffective against the Boosters.

Jayson Castro, who was earlier ruled out in the rest of the series due to an MCL injury, was fielded in by Talk 'N Text in a game-time decision. Castro hit his first six shots, ending the game with 19 points, six rebounds and six assists. Maurice Baker held Grundy to five points and a scoreless first half, while he scored 18 points to help the Texters tie the series for the final time.

=== Game 7 ===
Solar

August 21
7:00 p.m.

boxscores

Petron Blaze Boosters 85, Talk 'N Text Tropang Texters 73
Scoring by quarter: 28–17, 12–17, 24–19, 21–20
| Pts: Grundy 26; Rebs: Santos 16; Asts: Cabagnot 8 | Pts: Baker 22; Rebs: Baker 10; Asts: Baker, Castro 3 each |
Petron Blaze wins series, 4–3

Smart Araneta Coliseum, Quezon City
Attendance: 16,928
Referees: A. Herrera, S. Pineda, R. Yante

Petron had a 27–13 lead at the first period, with Dennis Miranda scoring the game's first seven points, followed by the rest of Petron's starting lineup to score all 28 first quarter points. In the second quarter, Ranidel de Ocampo and Maurice Baker scored nine and eight points respectively, to help cut the deficit to six at halftime. Baker scored on four free-throws: the first two after Jojo Duncil was called for flagrant foul, and another two from Sunday Salvacion's hard foul on the next play; the Texters had a chance to cut the lead even further but Santos denied de Ocampo's dunk at the buzzer. Talk 'N Text would not get close the rest of the way: the game was virtually won by Petron when Santos dunked in the final minute to post an eight-point lead, denying Talk 'N Text of a grand slam. Santos was named finals MVP, and Agustin is the second coach to win a championship after being an MVP as a player, after Robert Jaworski.

A similar feat of this would happen 14 years later when the now San Miguel Beermen defeated the now TNT Tropang 5G in the 2025 Philippine Cup Finals, thus denying TNT a Grand Slam again.

== Rosters ==
Note: Scottie Reynolds played for Talk 'N Text for Games 1 to 5. Maurice Baker, the team's import until the eliminations replaced him for Games 6 and 7.

Talk 'N Text Tropang Texters roster
Players
Coaches

| Pos. | # | POB | Name | Height | Weight | DOB (YYYY–MM–DD) | From |
|---|---|---|---|---|---|---|---|
| G | 1 | (United States) | Maurice Baker (I) | 6 ft 1 in (1.85 m) | 198 lb (90 kg) | | Oklahoma State |
| G | 2 | (United States) | Scottie Reynolds (I) | 6 ft 2 in (1.88 m) | 190 lb (86 kg) | | Villanova |
| G | 3 | (United States) | Jimmy Alapag (C) | 5 ft 9 in (1.75 m) | 160 lb (73 kg) | | Cal State San Bernardino |
| F | 4 | (United States) | Harvey Carey | 6 ft 3 in (1.91 m) | 210 lb (95 kg) | | Sonoma State |
| G | 10 | (United States) | Ryan Reyes | 6 ft 2 in (1.88 m) | 190 lb (86 kg) | | Cal State Fullerton |
| G/F | 12 | (Philippines) | Larry Fonacier | 6 ft 2 in (1.88 m) | 170 lb (77 kg) | | Ateneo |
| G | 17 | (Philippines) | Jayson Castro | 5 ft 11 in (1.80 m) | 167 lb (76 kg) | | Philippine Christian |
| F | 20 | (United States) | Jared Dillinger | 6 ft 5 in (1.96 m) | 220 lb (100 kg) | | Hawaiʻi |
| F | 21 | (United States) | Kelly Williams | 6 ft 7 in (2.01 m) | 215 lb (98 kg) | | Oakland |
| G | 27 | (Philippines) | Emmerson Oreta | 6 ft 1 in (1.85 m) | 180 lb (82 kg) | | UST |
| G/F | 28 | (Philippines) | Mark Yee | 6 ft 2 in (1.88 m) | 170 lb (77 kg) | | San Sebastian (Cavite) |
| F/C | 33 | (Philippines) | Ranidel De Ocampo | 6 ft 6 in (1.98 m) | 200 lb (91 kg) | | Saint Francis of Assisi |
| C | 34 | (United States) | Ali Peek | 6 ft 4 in (1.93 m) | 240 lb (109 kg) | | Saint Mary's |
| F | 40 | (Japan) | Rich Alvarez | 6 ft 4 in (1.93 m) | 200 lb (91 kg) | | Ateneo |
| F | 51 | (Philippines) | Aaron Aban | 6 ft 3 in (1.91 m) | 200 lb (91 kg) | | Letran |
| C | 98 | (Philippines) | Gilbert Lao | 6 ft 6 in (1.98 m) | 210 lb (95 kg) | | UST |

Head coach

- (Philippines) Chot Reyes (Ateneo)

Assistant coach(es)

- (United States) Norman Black (Saint Joseph's)
- (Philippines) Jamike Jarin (Ateneo)
- (Philippines) Nash Racela (Ateneo)
- (Philippines) Bong Ravena (UE)
- (Philippines) Jaime Macayan (UE)

Legend

- (C) Team captain
- (CI) Commissioner's Cup Import
- (GI) Governors' Cup Import
- (EI) EASL Import
- (DP) Unsigned draft pick
- (FA) Free agent
- (IN) Inactive
- (S) Suspended
- (R) Rookie
- Injured

Petron Blaze Boosters roster
Players
Coaches

| Pos. | # | POB | Name | Height | Weight | DOB (YYYY–MM–DD) | From |
|---|---|---|---|---|---|---|---|
| G | 1 | (Philippines) | Paolo Hubalde | 5 ft 10 in (1.78 m) | 170 lb (77 kg) | | UE |
| G | 2 | (Philippines) | Dennis Miranda | 5 ft 11 in (1.80 m) | 185 lb (84 kg) | | Far Eastern |
| G/F | 3 | (Philippines) | Lordy Tugade (injured) | 6 ft 3 in (1.91 m) | 185 lb (84 kg) | | National-U |
| G | 5 | (Philippines) | Alex Cabagnot | 6 ft 0 in (1.83 m) | 165 lb (75 kg) | | Hawaiʻi–Hilo |
| G/F | 6 | (Philippines) | Rey Guevarra (R) | 6 ft 4 in (1.93 m) | 175 lb (79 kg) | | Letran |
| F | 7 | (Philippines) | Nonoy Baclao (R) | 6 ft 6 in (1.98 m) | 210 lb (95 kg) | | Ateneo |
| F/C | 10 | (Philippines) | Danny Ildefonso (C) | 6 ft 5 in (1.96 m) | 210 lb (95 kg) | | National-U |
| C | 11 | (Philippines) | Rabeh Al-Hussaini (injured) (R) | 6 ft 7 in (2.01 m) | 210 lb (95 kg) | | Ateneo |
| G | 16 | (United States) | Anthony Grundy (I) | 6 ft 3 in (1.91 m) | 185 lb (84 kg) | | NC State |
| G | 18 | (Philippines) | Joseph Yeo (injured) | 6 ft 2 in (1.88 m) | 170 lb (77 kg) | | De La Salle |
| F | 23 | (United States) | Jay Washington (injured) | 6 ft 7 in (2.01 m) | 225 lb (102 kg) | | Eckerd |
| G | 24 | (Philippines) | Jojo Duncil | 6 ft 1 in (1.85 m) | 172 lb (78 kg) | | UST |
| F | 29 | (Philippines) | Arwind Santos | 6 ft 4 in (1.93 m) | 170 lb (77 kg) | | Far Eastern |
| F/C | 34 | (Australia) | Mick Pennisi | 6 ft 9 in (2.06 m) | 235 lb (107 kg) | | Eastern Michigan |
| F | 80 | (Philippines) | Sunday Salvacion | 6 ft 3 in (1.91 m) | 190 lb (86 kg) | | St. Benilde |

Head coach

- (Philippines) Ato Agustin (Lyceum)

Assistant coach(es)

- (Philippines) Gee Abanilla (De La Salle)
- (Philippines) Pido Jarencio (UST)
- (Philippines) Freddie Abuda (Cebu)
- (Philippines) Biboy Ravanes (Cebu)
- (Philippines) Olsen Racela (Ateneo)
- (United States) Bobby Parks (Memphis)

Legend

- (C) Team captain
- (CI) Commissioner's Cup Import
- (GI) Governors' Cup Import
- (EI) EASL Import
- (DP) Unsigned draft pick
- (FA) Free agent
- (IN) Inactive
- (S) Suspended
- (R) Rookie
- Injured

== Broadcast notes ==
The finals series were the last PBA games produced by Solar Sports as TV5 Sports was awarded the broadcast rights for the 2011–12 season.

| Game | Play-by-play | Analyst(s) | Courtside reporters |
|---|---|---|---|
| Game 1 | Mico Halili | Quinito Henson | Jinno Rufino and Magoo Marjon |
| Game 2 | Chiqui Reyes | Jason Webb | none |
| Game 3 | Sev Sarmenta | Andy Jao | Patricia Bermudez-Hizon and Mica Abesamis |
| Game 4 | Richard del Rosario | Jason Webb | Cesca Litton and Dominic Uy |
| Game 5 | Mico Halili | Ronnie Magsanoc | Chiqui Reyes and Mica Abesamis |
| Game 6 | Sev Sarmenta | Alex Compton | Magoo Marjon and Jinno Rufino |
| Game 7 | Sev Sarmenta | Andy Jao and Quinito Henson | Dominic Uy and Chiqui Reyes |
