= 2015–16 ABL season =

- League: ASEAN Basketball League
- Sport: Basketball
- Duration: 27 October 2015 – 21 February 2016
- Number of games: 60
- Number of teams: 6
- TV partner(s): (Indonesia) JakTV (Malaysia) TV1 (Philippines) Basketball TV (Singapore) SuperSports (Thailand) True Sport, Mono 29 TV (Vietnam) HTV pan-Asia: Fox Sports Asia

ABL season
- Season MVP: Local MVP: Wong Wei Long (Singapore Slingers); ASEAN/Heritage Import MVP: Matthew Wright (Westports Malaysia Dragons); World Import MVP: Reggie Johnson (Westports Malaysia Dragons); Finals MVP: Jason Brickman (Westports Malaysia Dragons)

2016 ABL finals
- Champions: Westports Malaysia Dragons
- Runners-up: Singapore Slingers

ABL seasons
- ← 2014 2016–17 →

The 2015–16 ASEAN Basketball League season was the sixth season of competition of the ASEAN Basketball League (ABL). The regular season started on 27 October 2015 and ended on 21 February 2016. Two Indonesian teams, the Indonesia Warriors and Laskar Dreya South Sumatra did not return to the league.

The Westports Malaysia Dragons defeated first-time finalist Singapore Slingers in the finals, earning the Dragons its first ever championship in franchise history since joining the league in 2009.

== Teams ==
Team	Location	Arena	Head coach
Hi-Tech Bangkok City	Bangkok	Thai-Japanese Stadium Gym 1 Hi-Tech Gym	(Philippines) Jerry Ruiz
Mono Vampire Basketball Club	Bangkok	Mono Vampire Gym; Chulalongkorn University Gymnasium; Sripatum University Stadium	(Thailand) Soontornpong Mawintorn
Pilipinas MX3 Kings	San Juan, Metro Manila	USEP Gymnasium (former arena); San Juan Gym; Malolos Convention Center	(Philippines) Jack Santiago
Saigon Heat	Ho Chi Minh City	CIS Arena	(United Kingdom) Anthony Garbelotto
Singapore Slingers	Singapore	OCBC Arena	(Singapore) Neo Beng Siang
Westports Malaysia Dragons	Kuala Lumpur	MABA Stadium	(Philippines) Ariel Vanguardia

== Imports ==
The following is the list of imports, which had played for their respective teams at least once. In the left are the World Imports, and in the right are the ASEAN/Heritage Imports. Flags indicate the citizenship/s the player holds.

Team	World Import(s)	ASEAN/Heritage Import(s)
Hi-Tech Bangkok City	(United States) Christien Charles (United States) Steven Thomas	(United States) (Thailand) Tyler Lamb (United States) (Israel) (Thailand) Freddie Goldstein
Mono Vampire Basketball Club	(United States) Anthony McClain (United States) Cleveland Melvin (United States) Michael Fey (United States) Quincy Okolie (United States) Paul Butorac	(Philippines) Froilan Baguion (Philippines) Leo Avenido
Pilipinas MX3 Kings	(United States) Will Creekmore (United States) Michael Fey (United States) Arizona Reid (United States) Nakiea Miller (Sierra Leone) Charles Mammie	(United States) (Philippines) Jerramy King (United States) (Philippines) Alli Austria
Saigon Heat	(United States) Lenny Daniel (United States) Paul Williams (United States) Will Creekmore	(United States) (Vietnam) David Arnold (United States) (Thailand) Moses Morgan
Singapore Slingers	(United States) Xavier Alexander (United States) Justin Aronel Howard	(United States) (Philippines) Kris Rosales
Westports Malaysia Dragons	(United States) Reggie Johnson (United States) Calvin Godfrey	(United States) (Philippines) Jason Brickman (Philippines) (Canada) Matthew Wright

== Standings ==
Pos	Team	Pld	W	L	PF	PA	PD	PCT	GB	Qualification
1	Westports Malaysia Dragons	20	16	4	1878	1612	+266	.800 (Note: Malaysia wins tiebreaker via head-to-head goal average (1.01 vs. 0.98); both teams had identical 2–2 head-to-head records against each other.)	—	Qualified for the playoffs
2	Singapore Slingers	20	16	4	1607	1434	+173	.800	—	Qualified for the playoffs
3	(Thailand) Hi-Tech Bangkok City	20	14	6	1666	1601	+65	.700	2	Qualified for the playoffs
4	(Vietnam) Saigon Heat	20	9	11	1593	1705	−112	.450	7	Qualified for the playoffs
5	(Thailand) Mono Vampire Basketball Club	20	3	17	1561	1722	−161	.150	13	Eliminated
6	(Philippines) Pilipinas MX3 Kings	20	2	18	1514	1745	−231	.100	14	Eliminated

Source: ASEANBasketballLeague.com

== Results ==
- Score of the home team is listed first.
- In case where a game went into overtime, the number of asterisks denotes the number of overtime periods played.

=== First and second round ===
Home \ Away	HBC	MNV	MX3	SGH	SIN	WMD
Bangkok City		80–74	100–66	88–71	83–74	79–83
Mono Vampire	68–78		76–74	70–74	69–97	81–94
Pilipinas	64–86	79–78		88–103	62–70	74–99
Saigon	70–74	78–73	68–88		74–86	92–100*
Singapore	83–80	72–66	63–57*	84–69		88–85
Malaysia	77–71	68–64	107–82	109–60	84–79	

Legend: Blue = home team win; Red = away team win.
Matches with lighter background shading were decided after overtime.

=== Third and fourth round ===
Home \ Away	HBC	MNV	MX3	SGH	SIN	WMD
Bangkok City		77–65	95–89	88–82	65–84	89–108
Mono Vampire	104–107*		101–82	99–100	74–93	98–115
Pilipinas	67–71	81–85		80–84	67–86	91–105
Saigon	94–90	90–79	84–79		60–62	91–82
Singapore	75–83	73–65	80–58	100–73		80–89
Malaysia	79–83	110–72	103–86	86–76	71–78	

Legend: Blue = home team win; Red = away team win.
Matches with lighter background shading were decided after overtime.

== Playoffs ==
Semifinals
1	Malaysia	2
4	Saigon	0
2	Singapore	2
3	Bangkok City	1

Finals
1	Malaysia	3
2	Singapore	2

=== Semifinals ===
==== Malaysia vs. Saigon ====
27 February

Westports Malaysia Dragons	84–68	Saigon Heat

MABA Stadium, Kuala Lumpur

5 March

Saigon Heat	76–89	Westports Malaysia Dragons
Malaysia wins series 2–0

CIS Arena, Saigon

==== Singapore vs. Bangkok City ====
29 February
15:00

Singapore Slingers	70–73	Hi-Tech Bangkok City

OCBC Arena, Singapore

5 March

Hi-Tech Bangkok City	66–95	Singapore Slingers

Thai-Japanese Stadium, Bangkok

7 March

Singapore Slingers	68–60	Hi-Tech Bangkok City
Singapore wins series 2–1

OCBC Arena, Singapore

=== Finals ===
12 March

Westports Malaysia Dragons	80–84	Singapore Slingers

MABA Stadium, Kuala Lumpur

14 March

Westports Malaysia Dragons	83–67	Singapore Slingers

MABA Stadium, Kuala Lumpur

19 March

Singapore Slingers	72–90	Westports Malaysia Dragons

OCBC Arena, Singapore

21 March

Singapore Slingers	75–73	Westports Malaysia Dragons

OCBC Arena, Singapore

26 March

Westports Malaysia Dragons	77–65	Singapore Slingers
Malaysia wins series 3–2

MABA Stadium, Kuala Lumpur

== Awards ==
The awarding ceremony was held before the game 2 of the ABL finals on March 13, 2016 held at the MABA Stadium, Kuala Lumpur, Malaysia.

- ASEAN Heritage MVP: Matthew Wright (Westports Malaysia Dragons)
- World Import MVP: Reggie Johnson (Westports Malaysia Dragons)
- Local MVP: Wong Wei Long (Singapore Slingers)
- Defensive Player of the Year: Christien Charles (Hi-Tech Bangkok City)
- Coach of the Year: Neo Beng Siang (Singapore Slingers)

=== Players of the week ===
Week	Player	Ref.
27 Oct. – 3 Nov.	Jason Brickman (Westports Malaysia Dragons)	
4 Nov. – 10 Nov.	Christien Charles (Hi-Tech Bangkok City)	
11 Nov. – 17 Nov.	Calvin Godfrey (Westports Malaysia Dragons)	
18 Nov. – 23 Nov.	Justin Howard (Singapore Slingers)	
24 Nov. – 30 Nov.	Moses Morgan (Saigon Heat)	
1 Dec. – 7 Dec.	Freddie Goldstein (Hi-Tech Bangkok City)	
8 Dec. – 15 Dec.	Anthony McClain (Mono Vampire Basketball Club)	
16 Dec. – 23 Dec.	Will Creekmore (Saigon Heat)	
6 Jan. – 13 Jan.	Wu Qingde (Singapore Slingers)	
14 Jan. – 19 Jan.	Wu Qingde (Singapore Slingers)	
20 Jan. – 26 Jan.	Calvin Godfrey (Westports Malaysia Dragons)	
27 Jan. – 2. Feb.	Kris Rosales (Singapore Slingers)	
3 Feb. – 9. Feb	Christien Charles Hi-Tech Bangkok City	
10. Feb – 16. Feb	Jason Brickman (Westports Malaysia Dragons)	
17 Feb. – 22. Feb	Matthew Wright (Westports Malaysia Dragons)	
