= 2012–13 GlobalPort Batang Pier season =

- Head coach: Glenn Capacio September – December 2012; Junel Baculi January 2013 – present
- General manager: Benedict Manalo
- Owners: Sultan 900 Capital, Inc.

Philippine Cup results
- Record: 1–13 (7.1%)
- Place: 10th
- Playoff finish: Did not qualify

Commissioner's Cup results
- Record: 2–12 (14.3%)
- Place: 10th
- Playoff finish: did not qualify

Governors' Cup results
- Record: 4–5 (44.4%)
- Place: 5th
- Playoff finish: Quarterfinalist (defeated by Rain or Shine in one game)

GlobalPort Batang Pier seasons

The 2012–13 GlobalPort Batang Pier season was the 1st season of the franchise in the Philippine Basketball Association (PBA). The team took over the Powerade Tigers after its sale to Sultan 900 Capital. Although it did not qualify for the Philippine or Commissioner's Cups, it was a quarterfinalist for the Governors' Cup.

== Key dates ==
- July 30: Coca-Cola Bottlers Philippines, owner of the Powerade Tigers, sent a letter to the PBA Commissioner's office informing it that the franchise would be sold to Sultan 900 Capital (owned by businessman Mikee Romero) for PHP100 million, with an additional PHP10 million franchise-application fee to the PBA. Under league rules, the sale required approval by two-thirds of the PBA board of governors. The board unanimously approved the purchase at a special board meeting August 17, and the team's name changed to GlobalPort Batang Pier.
- August 17: After the sale's approval, coach Bo Perasol asked to be released from his contract and Glenn Capacio was appointed interim coach.
- August 19: The 2012 PBA Draft took place at Robinson's Midtown Mall in Manila.
- January 3: Junel Baculi was appointed head coach, with Glenn Capacio assistant coach.

== Draft picks ==
Round	Pick	Player	Position	Nationality	College
1	9	Vic Manuel	F	Philippines	PSBA
1	10	Jason Deutchman	F/C	United States	San Diego State
2	4	A. J. Mandani	G	Canada	Missouri S&T
3	6	Mark Acosta	F/C	Philippines	Mapúa
4	3	Jan Colina	F	Philippines	Adamson
5	1	V. J. Serios	F	Philippines	State

== Roster ==
2012–13 GlobalPort Batang Pier roster
Players
Coaches

Pos.	#	POB	Name	Height	Weight	DOB (YYYY–MM–DD)	From
G	0	(Canada)	AJ Mandani (R)	5 ft 11 in (1.80 m)	185 lb (84 kg)		Missouri S&T
PG	3	(United States)	Solomon Mercado	6 ft 0 in (1.83 m)	185 lb (84 kg)		Biola
PG	4	(Philippines)	Rudy Lingganay	5 ft 10 in (1.78 m)	170 lb (77 kg)		UE
F/C	5	(Philippines)	Jondan Salvador	6 ft 4 in (1.93 m)	210 lb (95 kg)		St. Benilde
F	7	(Philippines)	Chad Alonzo	6 ft 4 in (1.93 m)	209 lb (95 kg)		Adamson
G	11	(Philippines)	Willie Miller	5 ft 11 in (1.80 m)	180 lb (82 kg)		Letran
G/F	12	(Philippines)	Marvin Hayes (R)	6 ft 2 in (1.88 m)	190 lb (86 kg)		José Rizal
G/F	14	(Philippines)	Mark Yee	6 ft 3 in (1.91 m)	170 lb (77 kg)		San Sebastian (Cavite)
PF	15	(Philippines)	Bryan Faundo	6 ft 4 in (1.93 m)	200 lb (91 kg)		Letran
F	16	(Philippines)	Jaypee Belencion (R)	6 ft 2 in (1.88 m)	176 lb (80 kg)		Letran
F	18	(Philippines)	Jay Washington	6 ft 7 in (2.01 m)	220 lb (100 kg)		Eckerd
SG	20	(Philippines)	Gary David	6 ft 2 in (1.88 m)	170 lb (77 kg)		Lyceum
G	21	(Philippines)	JR Buensuceso (R)	5 ft 9 in (1.75 m)	165 lb (75 kg)		BYU–Hawaii
F/C	23	(Philippines)	Kelly Nabong (R)	6 ft 7 in (2.01 m)	220 lb (100 kg)		SRJC
C	26	(Kuwait)	Yousef Taha	6 ft 8 in (2.03 m)	220 lb (100 kg)		North Lake
C	43	(United States)	Alex Crisano	6 ft 7 in (2.01 m)	240 lb (109 kg)		Brooklyn

Head coach

- (Philippines) Junel Baculi (Mapúa)

Assistant coach(es)

- (Philippines) Glenn Capacio (Far Eastern)
- (Philippines) Johnedel Cardel (De La Salle)
- (Philippines) Ricky Dandan (UP Diliman)
- (Philippines) Rommel Adducul (San Sebastian)
- (Philippines) Louie Gonzales

Team manager

- (Philippines) Benedict Manalo

Legend

- (C) Team captain
- (CI) Commissioner's Cup Import
- (GI) Governors' Cup Import
- (EI) EASL Import
- (DP) Unsigned draft pick
- (FA) Free agent
- (IN) Inactive
- (S) Suspended
- (R) Rookie
- Injured

== Philippine Cup ==
=== Eliminations ===
==== Standings ====
Pos	Team	W	L	PCT	GB	Qualification
1	Talk 'N Text Tropang Texters	12	2	.857	—	Twice-to-beat in the quarterfinals
2	San Mig Coffee Mixers	10	4	.714	2	Twice-to-beat in the quarterfinals
3	Rain or Shine Elasto Painters	9	5	.643	3	Best-of-three quarterfinals
4	Meralco Bolts	8	6	.571 (Note: Head-to-head record: Alaska 1–1 Meralco (Meralco +4))	4	Best-of-three quarterfinals
5	Alaska Aces	8	6	.571	4	Best-of-three quarterfinals
6	Barangay Ginebra San Miguel	7	7	.500	5	Best-of-three quarterfinals
7	Petron Blaze Boosters	6	8	.429	6	Twice-to-win in the quarterfinals
8	Air21 Express	5	9	.357	7	Twice-to-win in the quarterfinals
9	Barako Bull Energy Cola	4	10	.286	8	
10	GlobalPort Batang Pier	1	13	.071	11	

Source: PBA.ph

==== Game log ====
2013 PBA Philippine Cup game log
October

Game	Date	Opponent	Score	High points	High rebounds	High assists	Location Attendance	Record	
1	September 30	Barangay Ginebra	90–110	Miller (26)	Deutchman (6)	Miller (5)	Smart Araneta Coliseum	0–1	Boxscore
2	October 7	Air21	81–88	Miller (22)	Salvador (8)	Mandani (5)	Smart Araneta Coliseum	0–2	Boxscore
3	October 12	Talk 'N Text	103–108	Miller (22)	Miller, Salvador (7)	Miller (9)	Smart Araneta Coliseum	0–3	Boxscore
4	October 17	Meralco	105–104	Miller (33)	Miller (11)	Mandani, Salvador (4)	Mall of Asia Arena	1–3	Boxscore
5	October 20	Rain or Shine	83–94	Deutchman (18)	Miller (11)	Mandani (6)	Ynares Center	1–4	Boxscore
6	October 26	Petron Blaze	98–110	Manuel (23)	Manuel (10)	Miller (7)	Smart Araneta Coliseum	1–5	Boxscore
7	October 31	San Mig Coffee	78–82	Miller (19)	Miller, Manuel (10)	Miller (5)	Smart Araneta Coliseum	1–6	Boxscore

November

Game	Date	Opponent	Score	High points	High rebounds	High assists	Location Attendance	Record	
8	November 4	Barako Bull	95–94	Yee (20)	Yee (7)	Miller (8)	Smart Araneta Coliseum	1–7	Boxscore
9	November 9	Barangay Ginebra	79–81	David (27)	Deutchman (10)	Vergara (9)	Cuneta Astrodome	1–8	Boxscore
10	November 18	Petron Blaze	81–110	Guevarra (14)	Hussaini, Salvador (6)	David, Hussaini, Antonio, Miller (2)	Smart Araneta Coliseum	1–9	Boxscore
11	November 23	Meralco	92–101	David (33)	Salvador (16)	Miller (14)	Smart Araneta Coliseum	1–10	Boxscore

December

Game	Date	Opponent	Score	High points	High rebounds	High assists	Location Attendance	Record	
12	December 1	Alaska	95–101	Miller (22)	Salvador (10)	Miller (6)	Dipolog	1–11	Boxscore
13	December 5	Air21	92–113	Hussaini (20)	Manuel (9)	Miller (6)	Smart Araneta Coliseum	1–12	Boxscore
14	December 7	San Mig Coffee	96–107	David (22)	Deutchman, Salvador, Miller (8)	Miller (7)	Mall of Asia Arena	1–13	Boxscore

2012–13 schedule

== Commissioner's Cup ==
=== Eliminations ===
==== Standings ====
Pos	Team	W	L	PCT	GB	Qualification
1	Alaska Aces	11	3	.786	—	Twice-to-beat in the quarterfinals
2	Rain or Shine Elasto Painters	9	5	.643	2	Twice-to-beat in the quarterfinals
3	Petron Blaze Boosters	8	6	.571 (Note: Head-to-head record: Petron 2–0 San Mig)	3	Best-of-three quarterfinals
4	San Mig Coffee Mixers	8	6	.571	3	Best-of-three quarterfinals
5	Meralco Bolts	7	7	.500 (Note: Head-to-head quotient: Meralco 1.01, TNT 1.00, Barangay Ginebra 0.99)	4	Best-of-three quarterfinals
6	Talk 'N Text Tropang Texters	7	7	.500	4	Best-of-three quarterfinals
7	Barangay Ginebra San Miguel	7	7	.500	4	Twice-to-win in the quarterfinals
8	Air21 Express	6	8	.429	5	Twice-to-win in the quarterfinals
9	Barako Bull Energy Cola	5	9	.357	6	
10	GlobalPort Batang Pier	2	12	.143	9	

Source: PBA.ph

==== Game log ====
2013 PBA Commissioner's Cup game log
February

Game	Date	Opponent	Score	High points	High rebounds	High assists	Location Attendance	Record	
1	February 8	Petron Blaze	94–92	David (28)	Williams (15)	Mercado (11)	Smart Araneta Coliseum	1–0	boxscore
2	February 10	Barako Bull	88–98 (OT)	Aguilar (23)	Williams (27)	Mercado (16)	Smart Araneta Coliseum	1–1	boxscore
3	February 15	Barangay Ginebra	89–80	Williams (23)	Williams (23)	Mercado (13)	Smart Araneta Coliseum	2–1	boxscore
4	February 20	Talk 'N Text	79–99	Williams, David (19)	Williams (15)	Mercado (4)	Smart Araneta Coliseum	2–2	boxscore
5	February 24	Meralco	89–90	David (27)	Williams (13)	Mercado (9)	Smart Araneta Coliseum	2–3	boxscore

March

Game	Date	Opponent	Score	High points	High rebounds	High assists	Location Attendance	Record	
6	March 2	San Mig Coffee	84–91	David (27)	Williams (23)	Mercado (6)	Naga, Camarines Sur	2–4	boxscore
7	March 8	Rain or Shine	95–103	David (23)	Aguilar, Williams (10)	Mercado (8)	Smart Araneta Coliseum	2–5	boxscore
8	March 10	Air21	94–106	Sharpe (24)	Sharpe (9)	Mercado (6)	Smart Araneta Coliseum	2–6	boxscore
9	March 17	Alaska					Smart Araneta Coliseum		

2012–13 schedule

== Governors' Cup ==
=== Eliminations ===
==== Standings ====
Pos	Team	W	L	PCT	GB	Qualification
1	Petron Blaze Boosters	8	1	.889	—	Twice-to-beat in the quarterfinals
2	San Mig Coffee Mixers	6	3	.667	2	Twice-to-beat in the quarterfinals
3	Meralco Bolts	5	4	.556 (Note: Head-to-head record: Meralco 1–0 Rain or Shine)	3	Twice-to-beat in the quarterfinals
4	Rain or Shine Elasto Painters	5	4	.556	3	Twice-to-beat in the quarterfinals
5	GlobalPort Batang Pier	4	5	.444 (Note: Head-to-head quotient: GlobalPort 1.01, Barako Bull 1.00, Alaska 0.99)	4	Twice-to-win in the quarterfinals
6	Barako Bull Energy	4	5	.444	4	Twice-to-win in the quarterfinals
7	Alaska Aces	4	5	.444	4	Twice-to-win in the quarterfinals
8	Barangay Ginebra San Miguel	3	6	.333 (Note: Head-to-head quotient: Talk 'N Text 1.05, Barangay Ginebra 1.00, Air21 0.96; eighth seed playoff: Barangay Ginebra 110–102 Talk 'N Text)	5	Twice-to-win in the quarterfinals
9	Talk 'N Text Tropang Texters	3	6	.333	5	
10	Air21 Express	3	6	.333	5	

Source: PBA.ph

== Transactions ==
=== Trades ===
==== Pre-season ====
August 20, 2012	To GlobalPort; Val Acuña; 2012 1st round pick (Vic Manuel)	To B-Meg; Sean Anthony

August 31, 2012	To GlobalPort; Willie Miller; 2014 1st-round pick	To Alaska; JV Casio

==== Commissioner's Cup ====
January 31, 2013	To GlobalPort; Japeth Aguilar	To Talk 'N Text; Rabeh Al-Hussaini

January 31, 2013	To GlobalPort; Sol Mercado; Kelly Nabong; JP Belencion; Yousif Aljamal	To Meralco; Rey Guevarra; Vic Manuel; Josh Vanlandingham; 2015 1st-round pick

June 10, 2013	To GlobalPort; 2013 1st round pick (from Barangay Ginebra via Talk 'N Text and Barako Bull); Yousef Taha	To Barangay Ginebra; Japeth Aguilar

June 10, 2013	To GlobalPort; Jay Washington	To Petron Blaze; Jason Deutchman; 2016 and 2017 2nd-round picks

=== Governors' Cup ===
October 11, 2013	To GlobalPort; Chris Ross; Chris Timberlake; 2016 and 2017 2nd-round picks	To Meralco; Gary David; AJ Mandani

=== Recruited imports ===
Tournament	Name	Debuted	Last game	Record
Commissioner's Cup	Justin Williams	February 8 (vs. Petron)	March 8 (vs. Rain or Shine)	2–5
Commissioner's Cup	Walter Sharpe	March 10 (vs. Air21)	March 17 (vs. Alaska)	0–2
Commissioner's Cup	Sylvester Morgan	March 23 (vs. Air21)	April 14 (vs. Barako Bull)	0–5
Governors' Cup	Markeith Cummings	August 14 (vs. Air21)	September 26 (vs. Rain or Shine)	4–6
