= Yousif Aljamal =

Filipino basketball player (born 1983)

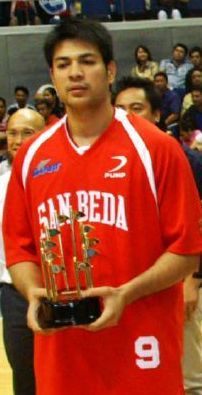
- Aljamal in 2007

Personal information
- Born: June 14, 1983 (age 43) Santa Rita, Pampanga, Philippines
- Listed height: 6 ft 4 in (1.93 m)
- Listed weight: 190 lb (86 kg)

Career information
- College: San Beda
- PBA draft: 2007: 1st round, 8th overall pick
- Drafted by: Air21 Express
- Playing career: 2007–2013
- Position: Small forward / power forward

Career history
- 2007–2009: Talk 'N Text Tropang Texters
- 2009–2010: Barako Bull Energy Boosters
- 2010: Sta. Lucia Realtors
- 2010–2012: Meralco Bolts
- 2012–2013: GlobalPort Batang Pier

Career highlights
- PBA champion (2008–09 Philippine); 2× NCAA champion (2006, 2007); NCAA Finals Most Valuable Player (2006); NCAA Mythical Team (2007)

Yousif B. Aljamal Jr. (born June 14, 1983) is a Filipino former professional basketball player from Pampanga. He played for five teams during his career in the Philippine Basketball Association (PBA). He is also a former NCAA Most Valuable Player for its 82nd season with the San Beda Red Lions.

== College career ==
In 2004, Aljamal tried out for the San Beda Red Lions and made the team. He enrolled in a marketing and communications course. As a rookie in NCAA Season 80, he led San Beda to a 7–7 record in the elimination rounds. San Beda made it back to the Final Four that season for the first time in seven years, defeating the Mapúa Cardinals to secure the last slot. By Season 81 he was seen as a MVP contender.

In Season 82, alongside a highly-touted recruiting class from San Beda's junior team and rookie foreign student-athlete Sam Ekwe, Aljamal led San Beda to its first title since 1978 with a 13–1 record in the elimination rounds and by beating the PCU Dolphins. In the game-clinching Game 3, he scored 23 points to win Finals MVP. For the season, he finished with averages of 13.4 points, 8.1 rebounds, and 1.1 assists in 26.8 minutes.

=== NCAA suspension and second championship (2007) ===
Aljamal returned for one more season with San Beda in 2007 alongside an intact core. He led San Beda to four straight wins in its opening week, which earned him Player of the Week honors. From there, San Beda qualified for the Final Four once again.

During Season 83, Aljamal applied for the PBA draft. However, he and San Beda had not sought clearance from the NCAA and as a result was suspended. Initially the suspension was for the rest of the season but was softened to only for the rest of the elimination round. Leo Najorda had also been suspended in 2005 for a similar reason. San Beda then went to court as they claimed that there was no clear policy on securing approval from the league to apply for the PBA. The Manila Regional Trial Court then issued a temporary restraining order (TRO) on the NCAA clearing the way for Aljamal to return. A week later, San Beda decided to withdraw the case and not play Aljamal for San Beda's last two games of the elimination rounds. The NCAA then made a rule to suspend any school that would take them to court, and in 2018, CJ Perez would be also suspended during the finals for not notifying the league of his draft plans.

Aljamal returned in time for the Final Four. With him, San Beda swept the Letran Knights in the finals for its second straight title.

== Professional career ==
=== Talk 'N Text Tropang Texters (2007–2009) ===
Aljamal was selected eighth overall by the Air21 Express in the 2007 PBA Draft, but due to a pre-draft day trade, he was sent to the Talk 'N Text Tropang Texters. He was on the team that won the 2008–09 Philippine Cup.

=== Barako Bull Energy Boosters (2009–2010) ===
Before the start of the 2009–10 season, Aljamal, Gilbert Lao, and Gec Chia were traded to the Barako Bull Energy Boosters in exchange for a first round draft pick. In the 2009–10 Philippine Cup, he debuted with 18 points in a loss to the Alaska Aces.

=== Sta. Lucia Realtors (2010) ===
On May 13, 2010, during the Fiesta Conference, Aljamal was involved in a nine-player, three-team trade that sent him to the Sta. Lucia Realtors.

=== Meralco Bolts (2010–2012) ===
On August 11, 2010, Sta. Lucia was sold to Meralco, with them keeping the rights to Sta. Lucia's players and changing the team's name to the Meralco Bolts. Aljamal played for Meralco in their first-ever game, making him one of Meralco's earliest players.

=== GlobalPort Batang Pier ===
On January 31, 2013, Aljamal, Kelly Nabong, Sol Mercado, and Jaypee Belencion were traded to the GlobalPort Batang Pier for Rey Guevarra, Vic Manuel, Josh Vanlandingham and GlobalPort's 2015 first round pick.

== PBA career statistics ==
Legend
GP	Games played	MPG	Minutes per game
FG%	Field-goal percentage	3P%	3-point field-goal percentage	FT%	Free-throw percentage
RPG	Rebounds per game	APG	Assists per game	SPG	Steals per game
BPG	Blocks per game	PPG	Points per game	**Bold**	Career high

=== Season-by-season averages ===
Year	Team	GP	MPG	FG%	3P%	FT%	RPG	APG	SPG	BPG	PPG
2007–08	Talk 'N Text	25	12.5	.286	.242	.625	2.3	**.6**	.0	.0	3.4
2008–09	Talk 'N Text	33	5.7	**.400**	**.367**	**.857**	1.0	.1	.2	.0	2.1
2009–10	Barako Bull	**36**	**20.3**	.390	.281	.744	**4.6**	**.6**	**.5**	.1	**9.6**
2009–10	Sta. Lucia	**36**	**20.3**	.390	.281	.744	**4.6**	**.6**	**.5**	.1	**9.6**
2010–11	Meralco	20	9.7	.319	.250	.333	1.7	.4	.2	.2	2.6
2011–12	Meralco	3	5.7	.333	.000	—	1.3	.3	.3	.0	2.0
2012–13	GlobalPort	7	12.4	.310	.125	—	2.6	.4	.0	**.3**	2.7
Career		124	12.3	.360	.269	.717	2.5	.4	.2	.1	4.7
