= Carlo Sharma =

Filipino basketball player (born 1980)

Personal information
- Born: September 20, 1980 (age 46) Makati, Philippines
- Listed height: 6 ft 6 in (1.98 m)
- Listed weight: 236 lb (107 kg)

Career information
- High school: Paco Catholic School (Manila)
- College: De La Salle
- PBA draft: 2004: 2nd round, 12th overall pick
- Drafted by: Shell Turbo Chargers
- Playing career: 2004–2015
- Position: Power forward / center

Career history
- 2004–2005: Shell Turbo Chargers
- 2006–2009: Red Bull Barako
- 2009–2011: Burger King Whoppers / Air21 Express
- 2011–2012: Petron Blaze Boosters
- 2012–2013: Meralco Bolts
- 2014: Air21 Express
- 2014–2015: GlobalPort Batang Pier
- 2015: Pacquiao Powervit Pilipinas Aguilas / Pilipinas MX3 Kings (ABL)

Career highlights
- UAAP champion (2001)

Ram Carlo T. Sharma (born September 20, 1980, in Makati, Philippines) is a former professional basketball player who last played for the Pilipinas MX3 Kings in the ASEAN Basketball League. He was drafted by Shell twelfth overall in the 2004 PBA draft.

== College career ==
In 2001, Sharma joined the De La Salle University, which was coming off its third straight championship with a rookie class that included Joseph Yeo, and eventual Rookie of the Year Mark Cardona. In his rookie season, he played a vital role for the De La Salle Green Archers as their defensive anchor. That season, the Archers made the finals against the Ateneo Blue Eagles. In Game 1, he threw a punch at Ateneo player Rich Alvarez, but the referees did not call the foul. The UAAP technical committee then suspended him for a game. With him out and nearly the entire team not feeling well due to a virus, the Eagles took Game 2, forcing a do-or-die Game 3. He returned in Game 3, in which he had 22 points and 14 rebounds, and the Archers won their fourth straight championship. He also limited Ateneo's star center Enrico Villanueva to just five points.

The following year, the Archers won their first 11 games of Season 65, including a win over the UE Red Warriors in which he had 24 points and 12 rebounds. They had an opportunity to sweep all the elimination rounds, but they lost their last game to Ateneo. They faced Ateneo once again, but this time Ateneo beat them in three games.

The 2003 season saw him, Yeo and Cardona become the veterans of the team. That season they fell to Ateneo once again, this time in the Final Four. After that season, he declared for the PBA Draft.

== Professional career ==
=== Shell Turbo Chargers ===
In the PBA rookie camp, Sharma impressed scouts by showcasing his ability to hit mid-range jumpers and score from inside. He was drafted by the defunct Shell Turbo Chargers in the 2004 PBA draft, along with Ateneo rival Rich Alvarez. He was rarely used by the team that had Billy Mamaril, Tony dela Cruz and former defensive player awardee Chris Jackson, as they came close to getting into the 2004–05 PBA Philippine Cup finals.

=== Red Bull ===
With Shell leaving the PBA, Sharma and his Shell teammates were placed into a dispersal draft. He was signed by the Coca-Cola Tigers. However, he didn't get to play a game for them.

Sharma was then signed by the Red Bull Barako during the 2006–07 PBA season. In a win over the Sta. Lucia Realtors, he scored six straight points to lead a 10–4 run that sealed the win. In a game against Talk 'N Text Phone Pals, he got into a fight with Asi Taulava, which led to the coaches of both teams getting involved as well. He was fined P1,000 for his actions. In a rematch with Sta. Lucia, he scored 13 points. His game became more solid under Yeng Guiao, and he gained more minutes when the Barako traded away Enrico Villanueva. For his performance, he became a candidate for the Most Improved Player Award which Gary David eventually won. Sharma averaged 8.8 points per game and 6.1 rebounds per game in 21 minutes that season.

The following season, Sharma contributed to a Red Bull team that finished in 3rd place in the 2007–08 Philippine Cup. Before the start of the Fiesta Conference semifinals, he suffered a nasty cut on the leg in a freak accident at home. Although they didn't make the finals, Red Bull still got third place in a win over the Magnolia Beverage Masters. In that win, he was ejected from the game for throwing the ball at a referee.

=== Burger King / Air21 ===
On May 29, 2009, Barako Bull traded Sharma to the Air21 Express (then known as the Burger King Whoppers) in exchange for Chad Alonzo. In a win over Sta. Lucia, he had 12 points off the bench.

The 2010–11 season saw Sharma get to play with his half-brother Rabeh Al-Hussaini, who was picked by Air21 in the 2010 PBA Draft. In their first win of the 2010–11 Philippine Cup which was over the B-Meg Llamados, he scored nine points and hit two clutch free throws in the last 30 seconds of the game. He then scored 13 points in a win over Barako Bull. Al-Hussaini's time with Air21 was short-lived as he was traded to Petron.

=== Petron Blaze Boosters ===
After two and a half seasons with the Express, Sharma, Dondon Hontiveros and the third pick in the 2011 PBA draft (which turned to be Chris Lutz) were traded to the Petron Blaze Boosters for Mick Pennisi, Sunday Salvacion and the eight pick in the 2011 draft (which turned out to be Allein Maliksi). The trade reunited him with Al-Hussaini. In a win over B-Meg during the 2011–12 Philippine Cup, he had 15 points. He also got to participate in the Blue vs Green: Dream Game, a rematch of former De La Salle players against former Ateneo players sponsored by the PBA for charity.

=== Meralco Bolts ===
During the 2012 Commissioner's Cup, Sharma and Celino Cruz were traded for Dorian Peña. However, he didn't get to play for Barako.

Before the start of the 2012–13 season, Sharma and Sunday Salvacion were traded for Jason Ballesteros. That season, he got to play once again in the Blue vs Green: Dream Game.

=== Return to Air21 ===
During the 2013 Governor's Cup, Sharma, Vic Manuel, and Meralco's 2016 second-round pick were traded for Noy Baclao and John Wilson. In a loss to Barako, he had 12 points.

=== GlobalPort Batang Pier ===
In 2014, Sharma and Ronnie Matias were traded for Enrico Villanueva.

=== Pacquiao Powervit Pilipinas Aguilas / Pilipinas MX3 Kings ===
In October 2015, Sharma was signed by the Pacquiao Powervit Pilipinas Aguilas (now the Pilipinas MX3 Kings) of the ABL to play as one of the team's local players. He got to score nine points in a loss to the Singapore Slingers. However, on November the same year, he was released by the team after a roster overhaul.

== Personal life ==
Sharma is the half-brother of former UAAP MVP Rabeh Al-Hussaini, whom he got to be teammates with.

Sharma's daughter Fifi is a former DLSU Lady Spiker and current Akari Charger and National Volleyball Team member who plays the middle blocker position. His son Ram plays basketball in the Philippines' United Basketball League (UBL).
