= Hubalde =

Hubalde is a surname. Notable people with the surname include:

- Freddie Hubalde (born 1953), Filipino basketball player
- Paulo Hubalde (born 1981), Filipino basketball player
