= Andrian Celada =

Filipino basketball player

Personal information
- Born: February 23, 1987 (age 39) Polangui, Albay, Philippines
- Listed height: 6 ft 3 in (1.91 m)
- Listed weight: 154 lb (70 kg)

Career information
- High school: Arellano (Manila)
- College: Arellano
- PBA draft: 2012: Undrafted
- Playing career: 2015–2022
- Position: Power forward / small forward

Career history
- 2015: Pacquiao Powervit Pilipinas Aguilas / Pilipinas MX3 Kings
- 2018: Valenzuela Classic
- 2018–2019: Manila Stars
- 2019–2020: Nueva Ecija MiGuard / Rice Vanguards
- 2020: Makabayan Warriors
- 2021: ALZA Alayon Zamboanga
- 2021: Rizal Golden Coolers
- 2022: Quezon City MG
- 2022: Imus Bandera
- 2022–2023: Manila CityStars / Stars
- 2022: Pegasus Brunei

Andrian Salvador Celada (born February 23, 1987) is a Filipino former professional basketball player. Celada played college basketball for the Arellano Chiefs of the NCAA Philippines. He was undrafted in the 2012 PBA draft.

In 2015, the Pacquiao Powervit Pilipinas Aguilas (now the Pilipinas MX3 Kings) of the ABL signed him to play for the team for the 2015–16 season.

In December 2015, Celada, along with Emmerson Oreta, Chad Alonzo, Sunday Salvacion, Jondan Salvador, and Charles Mammie, were released by the Pilipinas MX3 Kings after a roster overhaul by the team. Later in March 2016, Celada signs as the player for Mighty Sports in the Pilipinas Commercial Basketball League.
