= Sam Marata =

Filipino basketball player (born 1991)

Personal information
- Born: June 28, 1991 (age 35) Quezon City, Philippines
- Listed height: 6 ft 2 in (1.88 m)
- Listed weight: 198 lb (90 kg)

Career information
- High school: UPIS (Quezon City)
- College: De La Salle (2009–2012); UP (2013)
- PBA draft: 2013: 3rd round, 25th overall pick
- Drafted by: Petron Blaze Boosters
- Playing career: 2013–2016
- Position: Shooting guard

Career history
- 2013–2014: Petron Blaze Boosters / San Miguel Beermen
- 2015–2016: Pacquiao Powervit Pilipinas Aguilas / Pilipinas MX3 Kings

Samuel Joseph Marata (born June 28, 1991) is a Filipino former professional basketball player. He last played for the Pilipinas MX3 Kings of the ASEAN Basketball League. He was selected 25th overall in the 2013 PBA draft by the Petron Blaze Boosters.

== College / amateur career ==
Marata initially attended at Reedley International School, but later on, he transferred to University of the Philippines Integrated School (UPIS), where he became a standout and was awarded as the UAAP Season 70 Juniors MVP. After his high school career ended, he was recruited by DLSU but had to sit out for a year owing to UAAP's residency rules for student-athlete transferring from one UAAP member school to another. After serving his one-year residency, he made the Green Archers' line up for UAAP Season 72. He had his most fruitful outing as a Green Archer during his sophomore year, he averaged 7.3 points, 1.4 assists, and 25% shooting percentage from the three-point area in 16 minutes of play, while establishing himself as a reliable outside shooter. His numbers, however, saw a dip the following year. In UAAP Season 74, he averaged just five points and a 15% outside shooting clip in 17 minutes of play. He failed to make the team's line up for Season 75, citing academic problems. He decided to leave La Salle and returned to his high school alma mater at UP. After fulfilling his residency requirements, he made it to the Fighting Maroons' lineup for Season 76.

While in college, he played for the Blackwater Sports in the PBA Developmental League.

== Professional career ==
=== Petron Blaze Boosters/San Miguel Beermen (2013–2014) ===
Marata was taken 25th overall in the third round by Petron Blaze Bosters during the 2013 PBA draft.

=== Pacquiao Powervit Pilipinas Aguilas / Pilipinas MX3 Kings (2015–2016) ===
In October 2015, Marata, along with 17 other players, were signed by the Pacquiao Powervit Pilipinas Aguilas (now the Pilipinas MX3 Kings) of the ABL to play for the team for the 2015-16 season.
