= A. J. Mandani =

Filipino-Canadian basketball player (born 1987)

Personal information
- Born: February 27, 1987 (age 39) Mississauga, Ontario, Canada
- Listed height: 5 ft 11 in (1.80 m)
- Listed weight: 185 lb (84 kg)

Career information
- High school: Ascension of Our Lord (Mississauga, Ontario)
- College: South Suburban College (2006–2008); Missouri S&T (2008–2010)
- PBA draft: 2012: 2nd round, 14th overall pick
- Drafted by: GlobalPort Batang Pier
- Playing career: 2012–2020
- Position: Point guard / shooting guard

Career history
- 2012–2013: GlobalPort Batang Pier
- 2013–2014: Meralco Bolts
- 2016: Mahindra Enforcer
- 2017: Singapore Slingers
- 2018: TGE
- 2019–2020: Caloocan Supremos
- 2020: CLS Knights Indonesia

Alfred Jordan "A. J." Mandani (born February 27, 1987) is a Filipino-Canadian former basketball player. He was selected 14th overall in the 2012 PBA draft by the GlobalPort Batang Pier.

Mandani was traded to the Bolts in 2013 alongside Gary David for Chris Ross, Chris Timberlake and two second-round draft picks.

== PBA career statistics ==
Legend
GP	Games played	MPG	Minutes per game
FG%	Field-goal percentage	3P%	3-point field-goal percentage	FT%	Free-throw percentage
RPG	Rebounds per game	APG	Assists per game	SPG	Steals per game
BPG	Blocks per game	PPG	Points per game	**Bold**	Career high

=== Season-by-season averages ===
Year	Team	GP	MPG	FG%	3P%	FT%	RPG	APG	SPG	BPG	PPG
2012–13	GlobalPort	**29**	15.5	**.492**	.211	**.676**	2.1	1.8	**.3**	.0	**5.1**
2013–14	Meralco	7	10.9	.348	**.500**	.500	1.6	.6	.0	.0	3.1
2015–16	Mahindra	2	**18.0**	.000	.000	—	**2.5**	**3.0**	.0	.0	.0
Career		38	14.7	.453	.269	.650	2.1	1.6	.3	.0	4.5
