= Chad Alonzo =

Filipino basketball player

Personal information
- Born: July 29, 1983 (age 43) Caloocan, Philippines
- Listed height: 6 ft 4 in (1.93 m)
- Listed weight: 209 lb (95 kg)

Career information
- College: Adamson
- PBA draft: 2006: Undrafted
- Drafted by: Purefoods Tender Juicy Giants
- Playing career: 2008-2015, 2018–present
- Position: Small forward / power forward

Career history
- 2008–2009: Purefoods Tender Juicy Giants
- 2009: Burger King Whoppers
- 2009–2011: Barako Bull Energy Boosters
- 2013: GlobalPort Batang Pier
- 2014: Kia Sorento / Kia Carnival
- 2015: Pacquiao Powervit Pilipinas Aguilas / Pilipinas MX3 Kings
- 2018: Valenzuela Classic
- 2018–2019: Bacoor City Strikers
- 2019–2020: Imus Bandera
- 2021–2022: Makati FSD Blazers / AFP-FSD Makati Cavaliers
- 2022–2023: Bacoor City Strikers
- 2023: Muntinlupa Cagers
- 2024–2025: Rizal Golden Coolers

Career highlights
- PBL champion (2008 Lipovitan Amino); PBL Mythical First Team (2007-08 season)

Richard Hernando Alonzo is a Filipino professional basketball player who last played for the Rizal Golden Coolers of the Maharlika Pilipinas Basketball League (MPBL).

He was an undrafted player signed by the Purefoods Tender Juicy Giants in 2008 before being traded to Burger King. Burger King traded Richard Alonzo to Barako Bull for Carlo Sharma.

In 2015, Alonzo was signed by the Pacquiao Powervit Pilipinas Aguilas (later the Pilipinas MX3 Kings) of the ASEAN Basketball League (ABL) as one of the team's local players after being left unsigned by Kia. However, in December 2015, Alonzo, along with Emmerson Oreta, Charles Mammie, Sunday Salvacion, Jondan Salvador, and Andrian Celada were released by the Pilipinas MX3 Kings after a roster overhaul.

== PBA career statistics ==
Legend
GP	Games played	MPG	Minutes per game
FG%	Field-goal percentage	3P%	3-point field-goal percentage	FT%	Free-throw percentage
RPG	Rebounds per game	APG	Assists per game	SPG	Steals per game
BPG	Blocks per game	PPG	Points per game	**Bold**	Career high

=== Season-by-season averages ===
Year	Team	GP	MPG	FG%	3P%	FT%	RPG	APG	SPG	BPG	PPG
2008–09	Purefoods	19	9.9	**.471**	.000	.545	2.8	.3	.2	.2	2.8
2008–09	Burger King	19	9.9	**.471**	.000	.545	2.8	.3	.2	.2	2.8
2009–10	Barako Bull / Barako Energy Coffee	**34**	**22.6**	.453	**.250**	.667	**6.4**	**1.1**	**.5**	.3	**7.2**
2010–11	Barako Bull	11	11.9	.410	—	.643	2.9	1.0	**.5**	**.4**	3.7
2012–13	GlobalPort	7	10.6	.286	—	**.750**	2.3	.1	.1	.0	1.0
2014–15	Kia	6	13.8	.273	.000	.250	3.0	.8	.3	.2	1.2
Career		77	16.2	.441	.143	.640	4.4	.8	.4	.2	4.6
