= Jason Deutchman =

Filipino-American basketball player

Personal information
- Born: September 27, 1986 (age 40) Los Angeles, California, U.S.
- Listed height: 6 ft 6 in (1.98 m)
- Listed weight: 215 lb (98 kg)

Career information
- College: San Diego State (2008–2010)
- PBA draft: 2012: 1st round, 10th overall pick
- Drafted by: GlobalPort Batang Pier
- Playing career: 2012–2017
- Position: Small forward / power forward

Career history
- 2012–2013: GlobalPort Batang Pier
- 2013–2014: Petron Blaze Boosters / San Miguel Beermen
- 2014–2015: Barako Bull Energy
- 2015: Kia Carnival / Mahindra Enforcer
- 2015–2016: Pilipinas MX3 Kings
- 2016–2017: Mahindra Floodbuster / Kia Picanto

Jason Bryan Ticse Deutchman (born September 27, 1986) is a Filipino-American former basketball player. He last played for the Kia Picanto of the Philippine Basketball Association (PBA). He was selected 10th overall in the 2012 PBA draft by the GlobalPort Batang Pier.

== Professional career ==
Midway through his rookie season, Deutchman was traded from the Batang Pier to the Petron Blaze Boosters as part of a three team trade that also sent Japeth Aguilar to Barangay Ginebra as well as sending Jay Washington and Yousef Taha to GlobalPort.

On February 18, 2014, he was traded, along with the Beermen's second-round picks in 2016 and 2017 to Barako Bull in exchange for Rico Maierhofer.

In December 2015, Deutchman was signed by the Pilipinas MX3 Kings of the ABL.

== PBA career statistics ==
Legend
GP	Games played	MPG	Minutes per game
FG%	Field-goal percentage	3P%	3-point field-goal percentage	FT%	Free-throw percentage
RPG	Rebounds per game	APG	Assists per game	SPG	Steals per game
BPG	Blocks per game	PPG	Points per game	**Bold**	Career high

=== Season-by-season averages ===
Year	Team	GP	MPG	FG%	3P%	FT%	RPG	APG	SPG	BPG	PPG
2012–13	GlobalPort / Petron Blaze	31	16.8	.380	.330	.733	7.2	.5	.7	.4	10.3
2013–14	Petron Blaze / Barako Bull	21	8.0	.310	.300	.588	2.0	.4	.3	.1	3.8
2014–15	Barako Bull / Kia	10	13.1	.410	.350	.750	4.6	.6	.2	.1	8.1
Career		62	13.2	.366	.323	.697	4.6	.5	.5	.3	7.4
