= Jerramy King =

Filipino-American basketball player

Personal information
- Born: September 26, 1990 (age 36) La Cañada Flintridge, California
- Listed height: 5 ft 11 in (1.80 m)
- Listed weight: 165 lb (75 kg)

Career information
- High school: Crespi (Los Angeles, California); Kent Prep (Kent, Connecticut)
- College: Long Beach State (2009–2011); Cal State East Bay (2013–2014)
- NBA draft: 2014: undrafted
- PBA draft: 2015: 4th round, 36th overall pick
- Drafted by: NLEX Road Warriors
- Playing career: 2015–2019
- Position: Point guard

Career history
- 2015–2016: Pacquiao Powervit Pilipinas Aguilas / Pilipinas MX3 Kings
- 2017–2018: Rain or Shine Elasto Painters
- 2018–2019: Columbian Dyip
- 2019: NorthPort Batang Pier

Jerramy Francis Dinsay King is a Filipino-American former professional basketball player. He last played for the NorthPort Batang Pier of the Philippine Basketball Association (PBA).

In October 2015, King was signed by the Pacquiao Powervit Pilipinas Aguilas (now the Pilipinas MX3 Kings) where he was one of the two Heritage Import, the other being Alli Austria.
