= San Juan Gym =

Public indoor arena in Metro Manila, Philippines

- Interactive map of San Juan Gym
- Location: San Juan, Metro Manila, Philippines
- Coordinates: 14°36′23″N 121°01′21″E
- Owner: San Juan city government
- Operator: San Juan city government
- Capacity: 2,000
- Public transit: J. Ruiz

Tenants
- Pilipinas MX3 Kings (ABL) (2015); San Juan Knights (MBA) (2000–01); AirAsia Philippine Patriots (ABL) (2012); FlipTop (2012–16)

The San Juan Gymnasium is an indoor sporting arena in San Juan, Metro Manila, Philippines.

The arena was home to the Pilipinas MX3 Kings of the ASEAN Basketball League (ABL) and has played host to a number of basketball games of the Philippine Basketball League and the now-defunct Metropolitan Basketball Association.

== History ==
Since 2016, back when he was a mayoral candidate, Francis Zamora had plans to build a new sports complex. In 2024, as mayor, he announced that the San Juan Gym would be demolished later that year to make way for the sports complex. In 2025, the San Juan local government broke ground for the city's Makabagong San Juan Sports Center.

== Events ==
=== Basketball ===
San Juan Gym served as the home court of the first incarnation of the San Juan Knights in the MBA. The AirAsia Philippine Patriots used the arena for some of its games during the 2012 ASEAN Basketball League season. It was also home to the Pilipinas MX3 Kings in their only season during the 2015–16 ABL season.

It also hosted PBL games in the 2000s. In 2010, the national finals of the NBTC League were held at the San Juan Gym. During the 2010s, the arena hosted PBA D-League matches, NCAA juniors basketball games, and UNTV Cup games. During the 2020s, it hosted NBL games. It also hosted high school and youth basketball tournaments.

=== Other sporting events ===
The gym used to hold boxing events. It was used as the venue of the PBF flyweight championship in 2010. It was also used as the venue for the Philippine Youth bantamweight fight in 2023, which was shown on Manny Pacquiao Presents: Blow By Blow.

In 2005, it was used as the venue for fencing matches during the 2005 SEA Games.

=== Political ===
The gymnasium was often used by the mayor of San Juan for various activities such as mass weddings, distribution of school supplies, medical missions, etc. San Juan Gym also served as a source of revenue for the San Juan local government as they collected rental fees. In 2001, it was where the canvassing of election returns was held for San Juan during that year's general elections. In 2016, Vice Mayor Francis Zamora declared his intention to run as Mayor of San Juan at a gathering held in San Juan Gym.

The arena was also used as an evacuation center and had different purposes in different crises. In 2020, it was converted into a COVID-19 swab testing facility. In 2024, it was used as a temporary hospital when the San Juan District Hospital got flooded.

=== Entertainment events ===
The FlipTop Battle League commonly used the arena during championship tournaments.

Preceded by first venue	Home of the San Juan Knights; 2000–2001	Succeeded by Playtime Filoil Centre
