= Leo Najorda =

Filipino basketball player (born 1982)

Personal information
- Born: February 16, 1982 (age 44) Bangui, Ilocos Norte, Philippines
- Listed height: 6 ft 3 in (1.91 m)
- Listed weight: 190 lb (86 kg)

Career information
- College: San Sebastian
- PBA draft: 2005: 1st round, 9th overall pick
- Drafted by: Red Bull Barako
- Playing career: 2005–present
- Position: Small forward

Career history
- 2005–2010: Barako Bull Energy Boosters
- 2010–2013: Air21 Express / Barako Bull Energy Cola
- 2013: San Mig Coffee Mixers
- 2013–2014: GlobalPort Batang Pier
- 2014–2015: Barako Bull Energy
- 2015: Pacquiao Powervit Pilipinas Aguilas
- 2018–2019: Davao Occidental Tigers
- 2019: Bataan Risers
- 2019–2020: Pasig Sta. Lucia Realtors
- 2021: Roxas Vanguards
- 2021–2022: Imus Bandera
- 2022–2023: Koponang Lakan ng Bulacan
- 2023: Siomai King
- 2025: Abra Solid North Weavers

Career highlights
- 2× PBA champion (2005–06 Fiesta, 2013 Governors'); PBA All-Rookie First Team (2006); All-MPBL Second Team (2019); MPBL champion (2025); 2× MPBL All-Star (2019, 2022); PSL champion (2023); NCAA Most Valuable Player (2003); NCAA Finals Most Valuable Player (2002); 2× NCAA champion (2001, 2002)

Leomar S. Najorda (born February 16, 1982, in Bangui, Ilocos Norte) is a Filipino professional basketball player who last played for the Abra Solid North Weavers of the Maharlika Pilipinas Basketball League (MPBL). He was drafted ninth overall by the Red Bull Barako in the 2005 PBA draft.

== College career ==
Najorda helped the San Sebastian Stags win their first NCAA title since 1997 in 2001. They became back-to-back champions the following year. In 2003, he was chosen as the NCAA's Most Valuable Player, but the Stags lost in the Finals to the Letran Knights.

In Season 80, Najorda scored 21 points as he led the Stags to their first win that season after an 0–2 start. He then scored 16 points in a win over the Benilde Blazers. In a crucial game against the Mapúa Cardinals, he scored 23 points, grabbed 16 rebounds, and also added two assists, three steals, and two blocks to his statline with only one turnover to lead the Stags to the top of the standings. However, they then fell to fourth and in a loss to the Knights, didn't make the semifinals as the Cardinals and the San Beda Red Lions had superior quotients over the Stags.

In Season 81, Najorda fired 27 points with 20 in the second half to lead the Stags to a win over the Red Lions. In a game against the Perpetual Help Altas, he and his head coach Turo Valenzona were thrown out of the game for a flagrant foul on an Altas player. The coach was ejected for committing his second technical foul. Both were suspended for one game. In his return, he scored 14 points in a win over the Blazers. He then scored 10 of his 19 points in the third quarter during a win over the JRU Heavy Bombers. He scored 11 of his 23 points in the fourth quarter as the Stags secured a Final Four berth with a win over the PCU Dolphins. In the Final Four, they lost once again to the Knights, falling short of the Finals once again. At some point in the season, he was also suspended for three games for not informing the NCAA's ManCom that he would be applying for the draft.

== PBA career ==
=== Barako franchise ===
Najorda applied for the 2005 PBA Draft. He was picked ninth overall by the Red Bull Barako, but wasn't able to join the team already due to his commitments with the Stags. He was given a P3 million two-year deal by the team. One of his best games in his rookie season came in a win over the Sta. Lucia Realtors in which he had 12 points. That season, he took part in the Rookies vs Sophomore blitz game. His team won the 2005–06 Fiesta Conference championship by beating Barangay Ginebra in seven games. During the 2006 Philippine Cup, he had 21 points (which was his career-high at the time) in a win over Ginebra. He was also made a member of the 2006 PBA All-Rookie Team.

Najorda took part in the 2007 Rookies vs Sophomore blitz game, this time as a sophomore during the 2007 All-Star Weekend. He made four three-pointers in a win over the Alaska Aces during the 2007 PBA Fiesta Conference. In a playoff loss to the Talk 'N Text Tropang Texters, he had 16 points. At the end of the season, he was given a new two-year deal.

During the 2007–08 Philippine Cup, Najorda scored 10 points in a win over the Purefoods Tender Juicy Giants. He then scored eight of his 17 points in the third quarter to lead a Red Bull breakaway and rout to a 107–95 win over the Magnolia Beverage Masters. He also contributed to Red Bull's 18 three-point makes over the Welcoat Dragons during the 2008 Fiesta Conference. In that conference, he helped Red Bull claim third place by scoring 22 points in a third place playoff game against Magnolia. In the following conferences however, the team would always finish last, especially during the 2008–09 season.

Najorda scored 14 points in a win over the Rain or Shine Elasto Painters during the 2009–10 PBA Philippine Cup. He then had 21 points and eight rebounds off the bench in a win over the Tropang Texters to break an 11-game losing streak. Once again though, they finished dead last in the standings. In the first game of the following conference, the 2010 Fiesta Conference, he scored 12 points in a win over Sta. Lucia. He then scored a PBA career-high 25 points in a loss to the B-Meg Derby Ace Llamados. Against Alaska, he shot 7-of-11 from the floor to finish with 18 points to lead the locals in scoring and get just their second win of the conference. He scored 18 again against the Air21 Express, but this time they lost.

=== Air 21 Express / Barako Bull Energy Cola ===
Towards the end of the elimination round of the 2010 Fiesta Conference, Najorda was traded for Richard Yee to the Air21 Express, in time for the wildcard phase. In the wildcard phase, Air21 lost to Rain or Shine.

In his first full season with Air21, Najorda averaged just five points and two rebounds. During his second season with the team (now renamed as the Barako Bull Energy Cola), he scored 12 points in a win over the Shopinas.com Clickers. Later that season, he had 13 points in a loss to B-Meg. He averaged 7.6 points a game in his last season with the team before being traded.

=== San Mig Coffee Mixers ===
In 2013, Najorda was part of a five-team, ten player trade that sent him to the San Mig Coffee Mixers. He was part of the team that won the 2013 Governors' Cup, even though he rarely played.

=== 2013–14 season ===
Two days after the 2013 PBA Draft, Najorda and Mixers draft pick Justin Chua were traded to the GlobalPort Batang Pier for Batang Pier draft pick Isaac Holstein. Several months later, he was traded back to the Barako Bull Energy Cola. In a game against the San Miguel Beermen, he made a clutch four-point play and finished with 12 points, but Barako lost that game in overtime.

=== ABL career ===
Najorda was announced to be part of the Powervit Pilipinas Aguilas in the ASEAN Basketball League (ABL). However, he never played a game for them.

== MPBL career ==
=== Davao Occidental Tigers ===
Najorda then spent the next three years playing in “ligang labas” or small-time commercial leagues in different parts of the country. In 2018, he joined the Davao Occidental Tigers. He helped Davao get its first win by scoring 12 points against Imus Bandera. In Davao's second win, he had 21 points over the Quezon City Capitals. Davao went up to third place in the standings with a win over the Valenzuela Idol Cheesedogs, in which he had 13 points. One of his best games came in a win over the Laguna Heroes, in which he scored 25 points to lead his team from 22 points down, and the team got their sixth straight win in the process. He scored 17 points on five triples to lead Davao to its 11th straight win and go up to first seed. Davao fell just short of tying the league record of 14 straight wins as their winning streak ended at 13 straight with a loss to the GenSan Warriors. In that winning streak-ending loss, he had 18 points and six rebounds. He bounced back with a double-double of 22 points and 12 rebounds over the Marikina Shoemasters. He was chosen to take part in the MPBL's first-ever All-Star Game. The Tigers made it all the way to the finals, where they lost to the San Juan Knights in five games.

=== Bataan Risers ===
Najorda then joined the Bataan Risers for the start of the 2019–20 season. However, he left in September 2019 as the Risers underwent new management.

=== Pasig Realtors ===
Soon after leaving the Risers, Najorda joined the Pasig Realtors. He scored 20 points in a win over his former team Bataan. In a loss to the Makati Super Crunch, he led all scorers with 29 points. He then made a clutch jumper to get the win over the Bicol Volcanoes. In a loss to Basilan Steel, he had 22 points but it wasn't enough. He then had 21 points in a loss to San Juan that saw drop to seventh in the division standings. The team snapped their losing streak with a win over Imus. In a win that guaranteed them a spot in the playoffs, he had 12 points. In a playoff loss to the Manila Stars, he had 18 points and seven rebounds. The following game, he had 14 points and Pasig was eliminated from semifinals contention.

=== Imus Bandera ===
After his stint with Roxas, Najorda then played for Imus Bandera in the 2021 MPBL Invitational. In his first game with the team, he had 12 points to help Imus pull away from the Bulacan Kuyas for the win. He then had 17 points and four rebounds in a win over GenSan. In a game against Mindoro EOG Burlington, his head coach collapsed in the middle of the game, but he was able to lead the team to the win with 21 points and five rebounds. Imus was able to secure its spot in the quarterfinals with a win in their next game against Rizal Xentromall. In the quarterfinals, they won over Bicol with him leading with 23 points, two rebounds and two assists off the bench. In the semifinals, he had 24 points against the Nueva Ecija Rice Vanguards, but they failed to make it to the finals.

Najorda had an offer to play for Bohol in the VisMin Super Cup, but he decided to stay with Imus. After losing their first two games of the season, he scored 18 points to lead Imus to a win over Manila. He had 15 points and nine rebounds in a loss to Quezon City as they slipped to 2–7 in the standings. He scored 18 points against the Pampanga Giant Lanterns, but it wasn't enough as they got their ninth loss in 12 games. Despite the team's low record, he was still chosen to play in the 2022 MPBL All-Star Game.

== VisMin career ==
=== Roxas Vanguards ===
In 2021, Najorda joined the Roxas Vanguards in the VisMin Super Cup. He contributed 15 points in a close loss to the Pagadian Explorers. In a match against the Zamboanga Valientes, he hit a clutch triple with 19.7 seconds left to tie the game. His teammate Lester Reyes then hit the game-winning buzzer beater, giving the team their first win. He then had 16 points in the next game to put Roxas up fifth in the standings. In a loss to the Basilan Peace Riders, he had 19 points, but Roxas was still able to secure the fourth seed. In Game 2 of the first round of the semifinals, he hit clutch free throws and contributed 10 rebounds to send Roxas to the next round of the semis and upset Pagadian, who were the third seed. In Game 1 of the second round of the semis against Zamboanga, he made a clutch lay-up that sent the game into overtime. He then scored the first seven points in overtime before his teammate Chito Jaime finished the job by scoring the next five points and Roxas was able to pull away for the win. He finished the game with 19 points, five rebounds, a steal, and a block. In Game 2, although he received a technical foul, he was still able to contribute 16 points and send Roxas to the finals. In Game 1 of the finals against Basilan, he had 16 points and five rebounds, but Roxas suffered a blowout loss. He then led the team with 15 points in Game 2, but Basilan won the game and got the championship.

== PSL career ==
=== Koponang Lakan ng Bulacan ===
After his stint in the MPBL, Najorda then played for Koponang Lakan ng Bulacan in the Pilipinas Super League (PSL) Pro Division Second Conference Dumper Cup. Against the 1Munti Emeralds, he had 13 points and five rebounds to lead Bulacan in the win. In a win over Batang Kankaloo – Caloocan, he had 16 points, seven rebounds, and four assists, allowing Bulacan to get up to fifth in the standings. The team then got its fifth straight win against Pampanga, with him leading with 21 points, five rebounds, and four assists. In a loss to the Boracay Islanders, he had a career-high 31 points.

=== Siomai King ===
Najorda then joined the PSL-sanctioned D2 Super Cup, joining the Siomai King team. In his first game, he contributed 13 points in a win over the Antipolo Pilgrims. He contributed 16 points against the San Antonio Bobcats to send Siomai King to the finals. In the finals, he scored 17 points and Siomai King won the championship.

== Career statistics ==
=== PBA ===
Year	Team	GP	MPG	FG%	3P%	FT%	RPG	APG	SPG	BPG	PPG
2005–06	Red Bull	59	12.3	.422	.238	.739	2.2	.7	.3	.1	4.4
2006–07	Red Bull	55	17.2	.440	.308	.766	3.5	1.0	.3	.2	7.6
2007–08	Red Bull	46	20.5	.443	.287	.725	3.5	1.1	.5	.2	9.4
2008–09	Red Bull / Barako Bull	31	16.7	.378	.328	.818	2.7	1.2	.2	.2	5.8
2009–10	Barako Energy	34	20.4	.428	.327	.656	3.4	1.1	.3	.2	10.4
2009–10	Air21	34	20.4	.428	.327	.656	3.4	1.1	.3	.2	10.4
2010–11	Air21	32	15.1	.363	.438	.767	2.7	1.0	.3	.3	5.1
2011–12	Barako Bull Energy	37	13.9	.475	.308	.837	2.0	.6	.2	.0	6.5
2012–13	Barako Bull Energy	39	13.6	.388	.219	.680	2.3	.7	.3	.0	3.8
2012–13	San Mig	39	13.6	.388	.219	.680	2.3	.7	.3	.0	3.8
2013–14	GlobalPort	14	12.2	.403	.222	.909	1.9	.3	.0	.0	4.6
2013–14	Barako Bull Energy	14	12.2	.403	.222	.909	1.9	.3	.0	.0	4.6
Career		347	15.9	.423	.298	.747	2.8	.9	.3	.2	6.5

== Player profile ==
Najorda is a standout natural left-handed shooter. He rarely scored in his time in the PBA but he could get hot from distance. He is also known as a defensive specialist.

== Personal life ==
Najorda's brother Dave is a 6'5" forward who went undrafted in the 2013 PBA Draft.
