= 2005 PBA draft =

Player selection in Philippine basketball

General information
- Date: August 14, 2005
- Time: 4:00 pm
- Location: Sta. Lucia East Grand Mall, Cainta, Rizal
- Network: ABC

Overview
- League: Philippine Basketball Association
- First selection: Jay Washington (Air21 Express)

The 2005 Philippine Basketball Association (PBA) rookie draft was an event at which teams drafted players from the amateur ranks. It was the first PBA Draft to feature only two rounds of drafting and the first draft held in August due to the league's adjustment of the season calendar. It was held on August 14, 2005 at the Sta. Lucia East Grand Mall in Cainta, Rizal. Air21 Express won the draft lottery over the Sta. Lucia Realtors.

== Round 1 ==
*	Mythical team member	^{#}	All-star

Pick	Player	Country of origin*	PBA team	College
1	Anthony Washington*	United States	Air21 Express	Eckerd
2	Alex Cabagnot*	United States	Sta. Lucia Realtors	Hawaii-Hilo
3	Denok Miranda	Philippines	Coca-Cola Tigers	FEU
4	Jondan Salvador	Philippines	Purefoods Chunkee Giants	St. Benilde
5	Mark Cardona*	Philippines	Air21 Express	De La Salle
6	Niño Canaleta	Philippines	Air21 Express	UE
7	Michael Holper	United States	Barangay Ginebra Kings	San Diego State
8	Paolo Hubalde	Philippines	San Miguel Beermen	UE
9	Leo Najorda	Philippines	Red Bull Barako	San Sebastian

== Round 2 ==
Pick	Player	Country of origin*	PBA team	College
10	Cesar Catli	Philippines	Sta. Lucia Realtors	FEU
11	Neil Rañeses	Philippines	Coca-Cola Tigers	UV
12	Al Magpayo	Philippines	Coca-Cola Tigers	St. Benilde
13	BJ Manalo	Philippines	Purefoods Chunkee Giants	De La Salle
14	Larry Fonacier#	Philippines	Red Bull Barako	Ateneo
15	Mark Joseph Kong	Philippines	Alaska Aces	Adamson
16	Rey Mendoza	Philippines	Sta. Lucia Realtors	NU
17	Paolo Bugia	Philippines	Red Bull Barako	Ateneo
18	Mark Macapagal#	Philippines	Talk 'N Text Phone Pals	San Sebastian

== Eligibility ==
The PBA reached out to the University Athletic Association of the Philippines (UAAP) to allow its student-athletes to join the draft, but the UAAP denied the PBA's request. By the end of the application period, 55 players declared for the draft. This was later reduced to 49 applicants.

The following were the eligibility requirements for local players:

- All applicants must be 23 years old on the day of the draft;
- Must have graduated from college or high school in 2001.

Eligibility requirements for Filipino-foreigner entrants (Filipino-foreigners) were similar to the locals', but beginning this year, stricter guidelines were implemented:

- All Filipino-foreigner entrants must undergo an interview;
- Play at least 25 games in a local league;
- All Filipino-foreigner entrants must submit citizenship documents proving their Filipino lineage, including a Bureau of Immigration certificate of recognition, Department of Justice affirmation, and either an authentic birth certificate either from the National Statistics Office (if born in the Philippines), or an equivalent document if born outside the country. The deadline for submitting these was originally on May 1, but extended to May 31.

The eligibility of these players were allowed to be contested should the documents be found illegitimate.

== Undrafted players ==
Draftee's name followed by college. All undrafted players become rookie free agents.

- Jerwin Gaco - De La Salle
- Froilan Baguion - NU
- Alwyn Espiritu - UST
- Emmerson Oreta - UST
- Arjun Cordero - San Beda
- Jake Agleron - UST
- Artemio Almeda - UP Diliman
- Gerard Jones - FEU
- Romar Menor - St. Benilde
- Valentin Domingo - MLQU
- Christian Coronel - San Sebastian
- Ronald Capati - St. Benilde
- Ryan Dy - SCSIT
- Bryan Tolentino - NU
- Arden Guiyab - PCU
- Raymond Dula - Mapua
- Don Villamin - UST
- Dennis Rodriguez - PCU
- James Razon - FEU
- Cyril Santiago - FEU
- Melchor Latoreno - UST
- Mark Abadia - Adamson
- Vincent John Santos
- Don Yabut - FEU
- Heremias Sison - UST
- Jose De Guzman - FEU

== Note ==
*All players are Filipinos until proven otherwise.
