= Vic Manuel =

Filipino basketball player (born 1987)

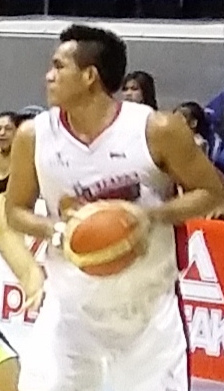
- Manuel with the Alaska Aces in 2015

Free agent
- Position: Power forward

Personal information
- Born: June 18, 1987 (age 39) Licab, Nueva Ecija, Philippines
- Listed height: 6 ft 4 in (1.93 m)
- Listed weight: 231 lb (105 kg)

Career information
- College: PSBA
- PBA draft: 2012: 1st round, 9th overall pick
- Drafted by: B-Meg Llamados
- Playing career: 2012–present
- Coaching career: 2025–present

Career history

Playing
- 2012–2013: GlobalPort Batang Pier
- 2013: Meralco Bolts
- 2013–2014: Air21 Express
- 2014–2020: Alaska Aces
- 2021: Phoenix Super LPG Fuel Masters
- 2021–2024: San Miguel Beermen
- 2024–2025: Terrafirma Dyip
- 2025: Pangasinan Heatwaves
- 2025: Converge FiberXers
- 2026: Iloilo United Royals

Coaching
- 2025: PSP Gymers (assistant)

Career highlights
- 2× PBA champion (2022 Philippine, 2023–24 Commissioner's); PBA Mr. Quality Minutes (2018); PBA Co-Order of Merit (2018); All-MPBL First Team (2025); MPBL All-Star (2025); PBA D-League MVP (2011-12 Aspirants' Cup); PBL Best Player of the Conference (2010 PG Flex-Erase Placenta Cup); PBL Mythical First Team (2010 PG Flex-Erase Placenta)

Victorino Aranas Manuel (born June 18, 1987) is a Filipino professional basketball player who last played for the Iloilo United Royals of the Maharlika Pilipinas Basketball League (MPBL).

He also served as an assistant coach for the PSP Gymers of the Women's Maharlika Pilipinas Basketball League (WMPBL).

== Amateur career ==
Manuel possessed tremendous athleticism and agility uncommon for athletes his size. He played college ball at Philippine School of Business Administration as a member of PSBA Jaguars varsity squad under Coach Joseph Ocampo where he was awarded UCAA Most Valuable Player. He first rose from obscurity two years ago when he stole the spotlight from older, more experienced players to capture the PBL MVP plum as a player of Pharex B-Complex.

He also suited up for the Cebuana Lhuillier Gems in the PBA D-League where he was awarded PBA D-League Aspirants Cup Best Player of the Conference honors, after averaging 15.9 points and 8.3 rebounds per game.

== Professional career ==
Manuel was drafted ninth overall by GlobalPort Batang Pier in the 2012 PBA draft. After spending one season at GlobalPort, he was acquired by Meralco in 2013.

On July 12, 2013, prior to the start of the 2013 PBA Governors' Cup he was traded, along with Carlo Sharma to Air21 for Nonoy Baclao and swingman John Wilson.

On March 10, 2014, PBA Commissioner Chito Salud approved the trade that sent him to Alaska Aces in exchange for Aldrech Ramos. With this trade, he reunited with his former coach at Cebuana, Luigi Trillo.

On February 23, 2021, Alaska traded Manuel, along with two draft picks, to Phoenix Super LPG Fuel Masters for Brian Heruela and three draft picks.

On November 5, 2021, Manuel, along with Michael Calisaan, was traded to NorthPort Batang Pier for Sean Anthony, Sean Manganti and a 2021 second-round draft pick. He never played for NorthPort as he was traded on November 8 to the San Miguel Beermen for Arwind Santos.

On September 4, 2022, Manuel won his first ever PBA Championship.

On November 25, 2024, Manuel was traded to the Terrafirma Dyip along with Terrence Romeo for Andreas Cahilig and Juami Tiongson.

On February 14, 2025, Manuel stated that he will not renew his contract with Terrafirma and intends to play for the Pangasinan Heatwaves of the Maharlika Pilipinas Basketball League beginning with the 2025 MPBL season. He will formally join the team on March 1. Before that, he will play for the Zamboanga Valientes during the Governor Hofer Invitational Basketball Championship in Zamboanga Sibugay.

On December 15, 2025, Manuel returns to the PBA as he signed with the Converge FiberXers.

== PBA career statistics ==
Legend
GP	Games played	MPG	Minutes per game	FG%	Field-goal percentage
3FG%	3-point field-goal percentage	4P%	4-point field-goal percentage	FT%	Free-throw percentage
RPG	Rebounds per game	APG	Assists per game	SPG	Steals per game
BPG	Blocks per game	PPG	Points per game	127	Career high

As of the end of 2024–25 season

=== Season-by-season averages ===
Year	Team	GP	MPG	FG%	3P%	4P%	FT%	RPG	APG	SPG	BPG	PPG
2012–13	GlobalPort	36	17.9	.477	.000	—	.606	4.1	.5	.6	.3	8.1
2012–13	Meralco	36	17.9	.477	.000	—	.606	4.1	.5	.6	.3	8.1
2012–13	Air21	36	17.9	.477	.000	—	.606	4.1	.5	.6	.3	8.1
2013–14	Air21	40	17.4	.541	—	—	.698	4.5	.5	.2	.2	7.8
2013–14	Alaska	40	17.4	.541	—	—	.698	4.5	.5	.2	.2	7.8
2014–15	Alaska	57	18.0	.500	—	—	.672	4.6	1.0	.5	.3	8.6
2015–16	Alaska	41	21.7	.535	.000	—	.718	6.2	1.0	.7	.6	13.7
2016–17	Alaska	26	20.2	.493	—	—	.744	5.2	.7	.3	.6	12.9
2017–18	Alaska	50	21.5	.485	.400	—	.716	4.9	1.2	1.0	.4	16.0
2019	Alaska	22	23.8	.450	.000	—	.851	5.0	.8	.6	.3	13.2
2020	Alaska	12	27.1	.444	—	—	.761	6.1	2.2	.6	.5	15.6
2021	Phoenix	23	21.5	.482	.333	—	.680	5.0	1.3	.3	.7	13.0
2021	San Miguel	23	21.5	.482	.333	—	.680	5.0	1.3	.3	.7	13.0
2022–23	San Miguel	46	16.3	.521	—	—	.694	2.9	.8	.3	.3	9.8
2023–24	San Miguel	12	5.0	.500	—	—	1.000	.7	.3	—	.1	2.3
2024–25	San Miguel	23	12.8	.493	.000	.000	.667	2.3	1.0	.1	—	6.7
2024–25	Terrafirma	23	12.8	.493	.000	.000	.667	2.3	1.0	.1	—	6.7
Career		388	18.8	.495	.200	.000	.707	4.4	.9	.5	.3	10.8
