= Emmerson Oreta =

Filipino basketball player and MPBL commissioner

3rd Commissioner of the MPBL
- Incumbent
- Assumed office January 17, 2026
- Preceded by: Kenneth Duremdes

Personal details
- Born: March 28, 1980 (age 46)
- Basketball career

Personal information
- Listed height: 6 ft 2 in (1.88 m)
- Listed weight: 180 lb (82 kg)

Career information
- College: UST
- PBA draft: 2005: Undrafted
- Playing career: 2010–2015
- Position: Point guard / shooting guard

Career history
- 2010–2013: Talk N' Text Tropang Texters
- 2015: Pilipinas MX3 Kings

Career highlights
- 4× PBA champion (2010–11 Philippine, 2011 Commissioner's, 2011–12 Philippine, 2012–13 Philippine)
Medals
Men's basketball
Representing Philippines
Southeast Asian Games
Gold medal – first place	2003 Vietnam	Team
SEABA Championship
Gold medal – first place	2003 Kuala Lumpur	Team

Emmerson Serrano Oreta (born March 28, 1980) is a Filipino former professional basketball player who currently serves as the commissioner for the Maharlika Pilipinas Basketball League (MPBL). He was undrafted in the 2005 PBA draft.

== Collegiate career ==
Oreta played for the UST Growling Tigers in the UAAP. In his final season with the team, he averaged 11.4 points and 4.3 rebounds per game. In addition, he was also the team captain of the team.

== Professional career ==
In 2003, Oreta played for the John-O basketball team in the semi-professional Philippine Basketball League (PBL), but a couple of months later joined the Sunkist–UST Tigers team, the PBL affiliate of his collegiate team, the UST Growling Tigers.

In 2008, Oreta joined the Smart-Pampanga Buddies of the semi-professional Liga Pilipinas and stayed there until 2009 when the team folded.

In 2010, Oreta finally got his first taste of action in the PBA after the Talk 'N Text Tropang Texters signed him from free agency. He won 4 PBA titles with the team.

In 2015, Oreta joined the tryouts held by a new team, the Pilipinas Aguilas along with many other hopeful veterans unable to make it to the PBA. A couple of weeks later, it was confirmed that Oreta will be a part of the final lineup of the Aguilas. However, in December 2015, Oreta, along with Sunday Salvacion, Charles Mammie, Chad Alonzo, Jondan Salvador, and Adrian Celada were released by the Pilipinas MX3 Kings after a roster overhaul.

In 2018, Oreta played for the Department of Agriculture Food Masters in the UNTV Cup. He was hailed the Best Player of the Game one time.

== International career ==
He was part of the Philippine squad that won the 2003 Southeast Asian Games basketball tournament and the 2003 SEABA Championship.

== PBA career statistics ==
Legend
GP	Games played	MPG	Minutes per game
FG%	Field-goal percentage	3P%	3-point field-goal percentage	FT%	Free-throw percentage
RPG	Rebounds per game	APG	Assists per game	SPG	Steals per game
BPG	Blocks per game	PPG	Points per game	**Bold**	Career high

Correct as of September 1, 2015

=== Season-by-season averages ===
Year	Team	GP	MPG	FG%	3P%	FT%	RPG	APG	SPG	BPG	PPG
2010–11	Talk 'N Text	**18**	2.7	**.381**	**.429**	**.625**	.5	**.4**	.0	.0	1.3
2011–12	Talk 'N Text	5	**7.0**	.357	.333	.500	**1.2**	**.4**	.0	.0	**3.8**
Career		23	3.7	.371	.375	.550	.7	.4	.0	.0	1.9
