= Jondan Salvador =

Filipino basketball player

Personal information
- Born: October 12, 1980 (age 46) Parañaque City, Philippines
- Listed height: 6 ft 4 in (1.93 m)
- Listed weight: 210 lb (95 kg)

Career information
- High school: SFACS (Las Piñas)
- College: Benilde
- PBA draft: 2005: 1st round, 4th overall pick
- Drafted by: Purefoods Chunkee Giants
- Playing career: 2005–2015; 2018–2020
- Position: Center / power forward

Career history
- 2005–2011: Purefoods Chunkee Giants / Purefoods Tender Juicy Giants / B-Meg Derby Ace Llamados
- 2011–2012: Air21 Express / Barako Bull Energy
- 2012: Powerade Tigers
- 2012–2014: GlobalPort Batang Pier
- 2014–2015: Barako Bull Energy
- 2015: Pacquiao Powervit Pilipinas Aguilas / Pilipinas MX3 Kings
- 2018: Cebu City Sharks
- 2018–2020: Marikina Shoemasters

Career highlights
- 2× PBA champion (2006 Philippine, 2009–10 Philippine); NCAA Philippines champion (2000); NCAA Philippines Mythical First Team (2001); PBL champion (2004–05 Open Championships); PBL Most Valuable Player (2004–05 Open Championships); PBL Mythical First Team (2004–05 Open Championships, 2005 Unity)

Jondan Y. Salvador (born October 12, 1980) is a Filipino former professional basketball player. He was drafted by the Purefoods Chunkee Giants in the 2005 PBA draft. He was a former Mythical Five awardee with the CSB Blazers during his NCAA years.

== Professional career ==
=== Purefoods / B-Meg (2005–2011) ===
Salvador was drafted by the Purefoods Chunkee Giants fourth overall in the 2005 PBA draft.

=== Air21 Express / Barako Bull Energy (2011–2012) ===
In 2011, he was traded along with Niño Canaleta to the Air21 Express for Joe Devance.

=== Powerade Tigers / GlobalPort Batang Pier (2012–2014) ===
In May 2012, Salvador was traded by Barako Bull to the Powerade Tigers in exchange for Doug Kramer.

=== Return to Barako Bull (2014–2015) ===
In 2014, Salvador was traded to Barako Bull in exchange for Mark Isip. Salvador came back to the Barako Bull team after playing for them in the 2011–12 season.

=== Pacquiao Powervit Pilipinas Aguilas (2015) ===
In October 2015, Salvador was signed by the Pacquiao Powervit Pilipinas Aguilas (now the Pilipinas MX3 Kings) of the ABL to play as one of the team's locals. However, in December 2015, Salvador, along with Emmerson Oreta, Charles Mammie, Sunday Salvacion, Chad Alonzo, and Adrian Celada were released by the Pilipinas MX3 Kings after a roster overhaul.

== Career statistics ==
Legend
| GP | Games played | MPG | Minutes per game |
| FG% | Field-goal percentage | 3P% | 3-point field-goal percentage | FT% | Free-throw percentage |
| RPG | Rebounds per game | APG | Assists per game | SPG | Steals per game |
| BPG | Blocks per game | PPG | Points per game | **Bold** | Career high |

=== Season-by-season averages ===
| Year | Team | GP | MPG | FG% | 3P% | FT% | RPG | APG | SPG | BPG | PPG |
|---|---|---|---|---|---|---|---|---|---|---|---|
| 2005–06 | Purefoods | 26 | **26.5** | .492 | .000 | .674 | **7.1** | **1.0** | **.5** | **.2** | **7.8** |
| 2006–07 | Purefoods | 31 | 21.1 | .454 | .000 | .500 | 5.8 | .5 | .2 | .1 | 4.0 |
| 2007–08 | Purefoods | **50** | 18.9 | .516 | .000 | .788 | 6.0 | .5 | .4 | **.2** | 4.6 |
| 2008–09 | Purefoods | 16 | 13.5 | .342 | .000 | .400 | 4.3 | .3 | .4 | .0 | 1.8 |
| 2009–10 | Purefoods / B-Meg Derby Ace | 24 | 8.7 | .406 | .000 | **.818** | 2.5 | .2 | .1 | .0 | 1.5 |
| 2010–11 | B-Meg Derby Ace / Air21 | 34 | 17.2 | .478 | .000 | .571 | 5.7 | .8 | .2 | **.2** | 3.8 |
| 2011–12 | Barako Bull / Powerade | 32 | 17.2 | **.589** | .000 | .533 | 4.7 | .9 | .2 | .1 | 4.4 |
| 2012–13 | GlobalPort | 33 | 18.2 | .500 | .000 | .513 | 5.6 | .9 | .3 | .0 | 3.8 |
| 2013–14 | GlobalPort | 34 | 12.3 | .485 | .000 | .588 | 3.9 | .5 | .1 | .1 | 2.2 |
| 2014–15 | Barako Bull | 25 | 10.3 | .407 | .000 | .000 | 3.0 | .6 | .3 | .0 | .9 |
| Career | | 305 | 16.8 | .490 | .000 | .611 | 5.0 | .6 | .3 | .1 | 3.7 |

== Personal life ==
Salvador owns a car financing business with his family in his hometown Parañaque. In February 2016, Salvador, with his cousin and four others were involved in a scam that involves tricking new car owners into borrowing their new cars for a car-renting service where the car owners are promised up to ₱40,000 ($840) per month, only to say that their car was "lost" but was instead allegedly given to Salvador, which he in turn uses in his own car business.

However, Salvador and the other accusers has denied he has any knowledge about this.
