= Sunday Salvacion =

Filipino basketball player

Personal information
- Born: December 17, 1978 (age 47) Tago, Surigao del Sur, Philippines
- Listed height: 6 ft 3 in (1.91 m)
- Listed weight: 190 lb (86 kg)

Career information
- High school: Rizal Memorial Colleges (Davao City)
- College: Olivarez College (1998); Benilde (1999–2002)
- PBA draft: 2003: 2nd round, 11th overall pick
- Drafted by: Barangay Ginebra Kings
- Playing career: 2003–2018
- Position: Small forward

Career history

Playing
- 2003–2010: Barangay Ginebra Kings
- 2010: Barako Bull Energy Boosters
- 2010–2011: Petron Blaze Boosters
- 2011–2012: Barako Bull Energy
- 2012–2014: Meralco Bolts
- 2014–2015: Blackwater Elite
- 2015: Pilipinas MX3 Kings
- 2016: GlobalPort Batang Pier
- 2018: Navotas Clutch

Coaching
- 2018: Navotas Clutch (assistant)

Career highlights
- 5× PBA champion (2004 Fiesta, 2004–05 Philippine, 2006–07 Philippine, 2008 Fiesta, 2011 Governors'); PBA All-Star (2007); PBA 2-Ball Challenge co-champion (2003); NCAA Philippines MVP (2002); NCAA Champion (2000); NCAA Philippines Rookie of the Year (1999)

Sunday Salvacion (born December 17, 1978) is a Filipino former professional basketball player. He played the small forward and shooting guard positions. Salvacion played college basketball for the De La Salle–College of Saint Benilde (DLS-CSB) Blazers before spending twelve years in the Philippine Basketball Association (PBA). Salvacion also played in the ASEAN Basketball League (ABL) and the Maharlika Pilipinas Basketball League (MPBL).

== Career ==
During his college career, Salvacion established himself as a prolific scorer and earned the NCAA Most Valuable Player award. Over the course of his professional career with the Barangay Ginebra Kings, he developed into a reliable defensive player and perimeter shooter, eventually becoming part of the team’s regular rotation. He was also recognised for his three-point shooting ability during his career in the Philippine Basketball Association.

Known to elevate his game during the playoffs, Salvacion's contribution was more evident during Ginebra's championship runs on the 2004–2005 and 2006–2007 Philippine Cup where he proved to be one of the key players.

On September 12, 2014, he and Jason Ballesteros were sent to Blackwater Elite in a three-way trade involving NLEX Road Warriors and Meralco Bolts. NLEX obtained Blackwater's 2016 and 2017 2nd round pick along with the draft rights for Juneric Baloria. Meralco received Sean Anthony from NLEX via Blackwater as third party.

In September 2015, Salvacion was signed by the Pacquiao Powervit Pilipinas Aguilas, which later became known as the Pilipinas MX3 Kings, of the ABL as one of the team's local players. However, in December 2015, Salvacion, along with Emmerson Oreta, Charles Mammie, Chad Alonzo, Jondan Salvador, and Adrian Celada were released by the Pilipinas MX3 Kings after a roster overhaul.

Salvacion later became part of the Navotas Clutch of the Maharlika Pilipinas Basketball League as a playing assistant coach to Elvis Tolentino.

== PBA career statistics ==
Legend
GP	Games played	MPG	Minutes per game
FG%	Field-goal percentage	3P%	3-point field-goal percentage	FT%	Free-throw percentage
RPG	Rebounds per game	APG	Assists per game	SPG	Steals per game
BPG	Blocks per game	PPG	Points per game	**Bold**	Career high

=== Season-by-season averages ===
Year	Team	GP	MPG	FG%	3P%	FT%	RPG	APG	SPG	BPG	PPG
2003	Barangay Ginebra	35	16.5	.382	.289	.714	2.9	.5	.3	.0	6.5
2004–05	Barangay Ginebra	**76**	19.8	.343	.319	.625	3.1	.7	.3	**.2**	5.3
2005–06	Barangay Ginebra	41	13.6	.387	.250	.706	2.4	.3	.1	.1	3.7
2006–07	Barangay Ginebra	52	**26.9**	.470	.316	.767	**5.0**	.9	.2	**.2**	**10.6**
2007–08	Barangay Ginebra	45	18.0	.336	.330	.800	3.5	.8	.1	.0	6.4
2008–09	Barangay Ginebra	40	21.3	.357	.323	.580	3.8	**1.0**	.1	.1	9.5
2009–10	Barangay Ginebra	35	16.2	.362	.324	.800	3.4	.5	.2	.0	6.1
2010–11	Barako Bull	55	20.0	.349	.316	.714	3.2	.6	.2	.1	7.2
2010–11	San Miguel	55	20.0	.349	.316	.714	3.2	.6	.2	.1	7.2
2011–12	Barako Bull	20	17.1	.320	.294	.500	1.8	.6	**.4**	.1	5.5
2012–13	Meralco	42	20.4	.354	.350	.750	2.9	.5	.2	.1	6.7
2013–14	Meralco	25	14.8	.368	.347	**.900**	1.4	.2	.2	.0	5.0
2014–15	Blackwater	20	15.5	.325	.269	.800	1.7	.4	.2	.1	6.0
2015–16	GlobalPort	6	11.3	**.500**	**.429**	.333	1.2	.0	.2	**.2**	2.7
Career		492	18.9	.368	.317	.717	3.1	.6	.2	.1	6.6

== Personal life ==
Salvacion now resides in Antipolo along with his mother, sister and his wife.
