= Will Creekmore =

American basketball player (born 1989)

Will Creekmore ウィル・クリークモア
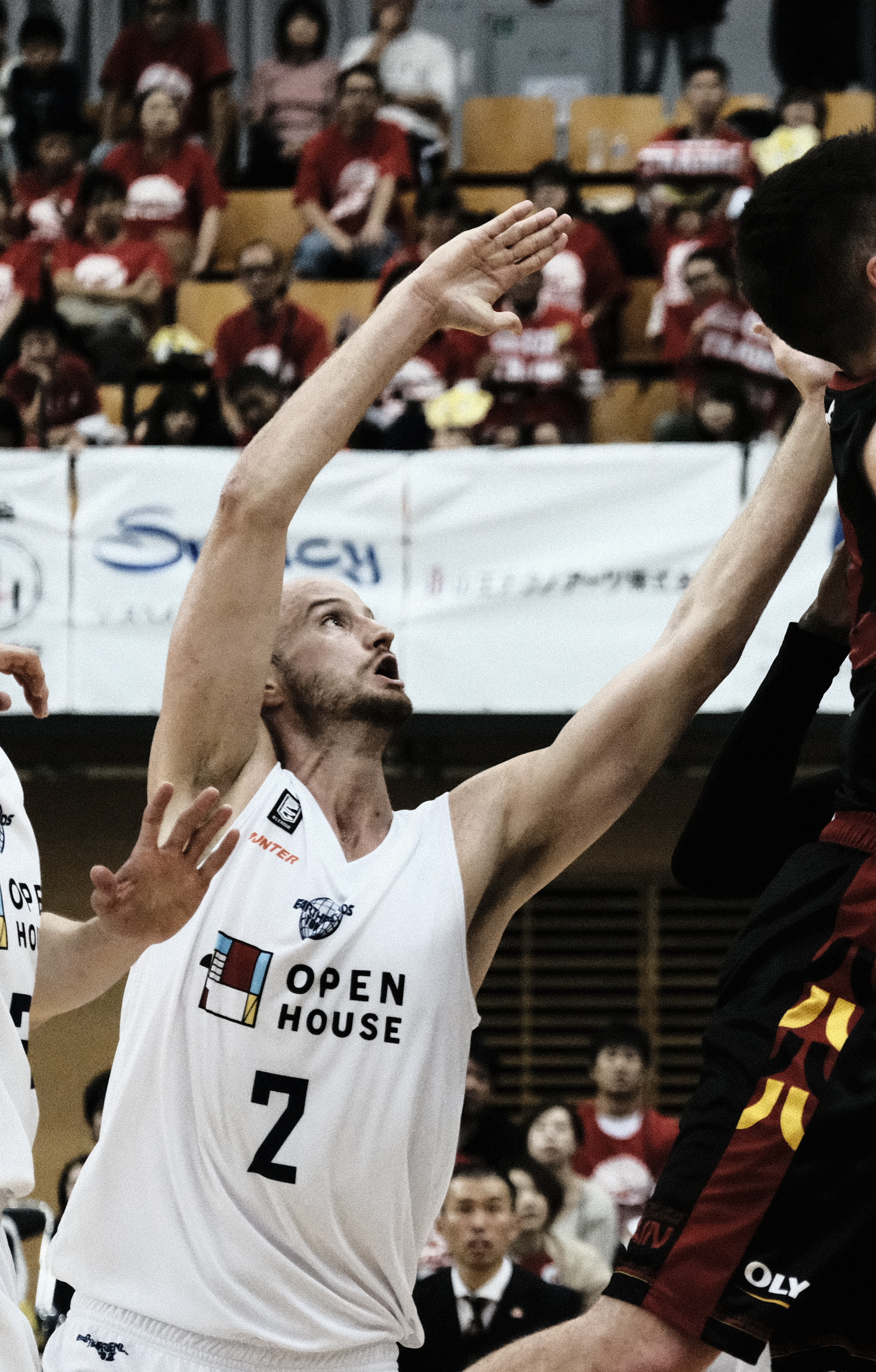

Free agent
- Position: Power forward / center

Personal information
- Born: April 9, 1989 (age 37) Tulsa, Oklahoma, U.S.
- Listed height: 6 ft 9 in (2.06 m)
- Listed weight: 242 lb (110 kg)

Career information
- High school: Thomas Edison Prep (Tulsa, Oklahoma)
- College: Boston University (2007–2008); Missouri State (2008–2011)
- NBA draft: 2011: undrafted
- Playing career: 2011–present

Career history
- 2011–2012: Ehingen Urspring
- 2012: Tulsa 66ers
- 2013–2014: Worcester Wolves
- 2014–2015: UJAP Quimper 29
- 2015–2016: Saigon Heat
- 2016: Pilipinas MX3 Kings
- 2016: US Heffingen
- 2016: Moncton Miracles
- 2016: Club Atlético Bohemios
- 2016: Nishinomiya Storks
- 2016–2017: Earthfriends Tokyo Z
- 2017–2018: Yamagata Wyverns
- 2018–2019: Earthfriends Tokyo Z
- 2019: Yamagata Wyverns
- 2019–2020: Ibaraki Robots
- 2020: Shiga Lakestars
- 2021–2024: Saitama Broncos
- 2024: Rizing Zephyr Fukuoka

William Thomas Creekmore (born April 9, 1989) is an American professional basketball player who last played for Rizing Zephyr Fukuoka of the B.League. He played college basketball for Boston University and Missouri State.

Creekmore signed with Ibaraki Robots of the B.League on August 5, 2019. On September 5, 2020, he signed with the Shiga Lakes.

== Awards and honors ==
- 2011 All-MVC Scholar-Athlete of the Year
- 2014 Eurobasket.com／All-British BBL Center of the Year
- 2014 BBL Player of the Year

== Career statistics ==
Legend
GP	Games played	GS	Games started	MPG	Minutes per game
FG%	Field goal percentage	3P%	3-point field goal percentage	FT%	Free throw percentage
RPG	Rebounds per game	APG	Assists per game	SPG	Steals per game
BPG	Blocks per game	PPG	Points per game	**Bold**	Career high

Year	Team	GP	GS	MPG	FG%	3P%	FT%	RPG	APG	SPG	BPG	PPG
2016–17	Nishinomiya/TokyoZ	39	37	31.8	.439	.398	.752	11.7	2.4	0.7	1.2	18.4
2017–18	Yamagata	56	48	28.2	.461	.354	.704	8.8	2.7	0.8	0.7	17.1
