= Charles Mammie =

Sierra Leonean basketball player

Personal information
- Born: November 6, 1992 (age 34) Freetown, Sierra Leone
- Listed height: 6 ft 8 in (2.03 m)
- Listed weight: 250 lb (113 kg)

Career information
- High school: Collegiate for Boys - Sierra Leone
- College: Arellano; UE
- Playing career: 2015–2019
- Position: Center

Career history
- 2015: Pilipinas MX3 Kings
- 2019: Marikina Shoemasters (3x3)

Charles Hilton Mammie is a Sierra Leonean professional basketball player who last played for the Marikina Shoemasters in the Chooks-to-Go Pilipinas 3x3. In December 2015, Mammie, along with Emmerson Oreta, Sunday Salvacion, Adrian Celada, Jondan Salvador, and Chad Alonzo, were released by the Pilipinas MX3 Kings after a roster overhaul. He was later replaced by Shaun Pruitt.

== Collegiate career ==
He was recruited by the University of the East after a stint with the Arellano Chiefs.

Season	Team	G	MPG	FG%	3P%	FT%	RPG	APG	SPG	BPG	PPG
2013	UE	12	33.25	0.468	0.000	0.548	19.00	0.58	0.75	0.75	15.08
2014	UE	15	21.33	0.484	0.000	0.416	9.40	1.00	0.67	1.00	10.60
