= 2009–10 Barako Energy Coffee Masters season =

- Head coach: Leo Isaac
- General Manager: Andy Jao
- Owner(s): Photokina Marketing Corporation

Philippine Cup results
- Record: 3–15 (16.7%)
- Place: 10th
- Playoff finish: eliminated

Fiesta Conference results
- Record: 3–15 (16.7%)
- Place: 10th
- Playoff finish: eliminated

Barako Energy Coffee Masters seasons

The 2009–10 Barako Energy Coffee Masters season was the 10th season of the franchise in the Philippine Basketball Association (PBA). In the Philippine Cup, they were known as the Barako Bull Energy Boosters.

== Key dates ==
- August 2: The 2009 PBA Draft took place in Fort Bonifacio, Taguig.

== Draft picks ==
Round	Pick	Player	Height	Position	Nationality	College
2	12	Benedict Fernandez	6'0"	Point guard	Philippines	FEU
2	19	Edwin Asoro	6'3"	Forward	Philippines	NU

== Roster ==
2009–10 Barako Energy Coffee Masters roster
Players

Pos.	#	POB	Name	Height	Weight	DOB (YYYY–MM–DD)	From
F/C	0	(Philippines)	Bryan Faundo	6 ft 4 in (1.93 m)	220 lb (100 kg)		Letran
PG	4	(Philippines)	Christian Coronel	5 ft 11 in (1.80 m)	165 lb (75 kg)		San Sebastian
SF	5	(Philippines)	Rob Wainwright	6 ft 7 in (2.01 m)	200 lb (91 kg)		Solano CC
F	10	(Philippines)	Mark Isip	6 ft 4 in (1.93 m)	210 lb (95 kg)		Far Eastern
G	11	(Philippines)	Jojo Duncil	6 ft 0 in (1.83 m)	178 lb (81 kg)		UST
G	12	(Philippines)	Paolo Hubalde	5 ft 11 in (1.80 m)	170 lb (77 kg)		UE
PF	16	(Philippines)	Jerwin Gaco	6 ft 3 in (1.91 m)	180 lb (82 kg)		De La Salle
PG	19	(Philippines)	Al Vergara	5 ft 7 in (1.70 m)	165 lb (75 kg)		Saint Francis of Assisi
F	20	(Philippines)	Richard Alonzo	6 ft 4 in (1.93 m)	209 lb (95 kg)		Adamson
F/C	22	(United States)	Reyes, Rob	6 ft 6 in (1.98 m)	225 lb (102 kg)		Flagler
G/F	23	(United States)	Sammy Monroe (I)	6 ft 5 in (1.96 m)	215 lb (98 kg)		Newberry
F/C	55	(Philippines)	Richard Yee	6 ft 4 in (1.93 m)	210 lb (95 kg)		UST
G	88	(Philippines)	Aries Dimaunahan	6 ft 0 in (1.83 m)	185 lb (84 kg)		UST
F/C	98	(Philippines)	Gilbert Lao	6 ft 7 in (2.01 m)	210 lb (95 kg)		UST

Coaches
Head coach
- (Philippines) Junel Baculi (Mapúa)
Assistant(s)
- (Philippines) Raymund Celis (UP Diliman)
- (Philippines) Magnum Membrere (Ateneo)

Legend
- (DP) Unsigned draft pick
- (FA) Free agent
- (S) Suspended
- Injured

== Philippine Cup ==
=== Eliminations ===
==== Standings ====
Pos	Team	W	L	PCT	GB	Qualification
1	Alaska Aces	13	5	.722 (Note: Head-to-head record: Alaska 2–0 San Miguel)	—	Advance to semifinals
2	San Miguel Beermen	13	5	.722	—	Advance to semifinals
3	Purefoods Tender Juicy Giants	12	6	.667 (Note: Head-to-head record: Purefoods 1–1 Barangay Ginebra; Purefoods 0, Barangay Ginebra 0; overall point differential: Purefoods +85, Barangay Ginebra +75)	1	Advance to quarterfinals
4	Barangay Ginebra Kings	12	6	.667	1	Advance to quarterfinals
5	Talk 'N Text Tropang Texters	11	7	.611	2	Advance to quarterfinals
6	Sta. Lucia Realtors	10	8	.556	3	Advance to wildcard round
7	Coca-Cola Tigers	6	12	.333 (Note: Head-to-head record: Burger King 1–1, Coca-Cola; Burger King +10, Coca-Cola −10)	7	Advance to wildcard round
8	Burger King Whoppers	6	12	.333	7	Advance to wildcard round
9	Rain or Shine Elasto Painters	4	14	.222	9	Advance to wildcard round
10	Barako Bull Energy Boosters	3	15	.167	10	
—	Smart Gilas (G)	3	6	.333	5.5	Guest team (Note: Smart Gilas's results do not count in the standings.)

Source: PBA.ph
(G) Guests

==== Game log ====
2010 PBA Philippine Cup game log
October

Game	Date	Opponent	Score	High points	High rebounds	High assists	Location Attendance	Record
1	October 14	Alaska	82–99	Aljamal (18)	Aljamal (15)	Dimaunahan (3)	Araneta Coliseum	0–1
2	October 18	Coca Cola	83–71	Membrere (14)	Aljamal, Crisano (8)	Dimaunahan (5)	Araneta Coliseum	1–1
3	October 23	Purefoods	77–92	Menor (14)	Crisano (10)	Najorda (4)	Cuneta Astrodome	1–2
4	October 28	Rain or Shine	89–81	Alonzo (15)	Alonzo (11)	Alonzo, Dimaunahan (5)	Araneta Coliseum	2–2

November

Game	Date	Opponent	Score	High points	High rebounds	High assists	Location Attendance	Record
5	November 6	Barangay Ginebra	86–94	Najorda (15)	Crisano (10)	Dimaunahan (7)	Cuneta Astrodome	2–3
6	November 13	Talk 'N Text	90–93	Menor (12)	Alonzo (8)	Belano (6)	Ynares Center	2–4
7	November 15	San Miguel	89–104	Aljamal (21)	Crisano (7)	Hubalde (5)	Araneta Coliseum	2–5
8	November 20	Burger King	86–102	Menor, Hubalde (17)	Crisano (10)	Dimaunahan (5)	Araneta Coliseum	2–6
9	November 22	Sta. Lucia	77–80 (OT)	Aljamal (14)	Alonzo (12)	Lao (5)	Araneta Coliseum	2–7
10	November 29	Alaska	88–99	Aljamal (21)	Crisano (11)	Dimaunahan (4)	Ynares Sports Arena	2–8

December

Game	Date	Opponent	Score	High points	High rebounds	High assists	Location Attendance	Record
11	December 4	Barangay Ginebra	76–88	Najorda (14)	Alonzo (9)	Hubalde (6)	Araneta Coliseum	2–9
12	December 9	Purefoods	66–70	Fernandez (12)	Alonzo (18)	Chia, 2 others (3)	Araneta Coliseum	2–10
13	December 18	Burger King	99–102	Aljamal (21)	Alonzo (12)	Belano (9)	Araneta Coliseum	2–11
14	December 23	Rain or Shine	72–88	Menor (18)	Menor (10)	Hubalde, Belano (3)	Cuneta Astrodome	2–12

January

Game	Date	Opponent	Score	High points	High rebounds	High assists	Location Attendance	Record
15	January 8	San Miguel	85–94	Menor, Dimaunahan, Duncil (16)	Reyes (13)	Belano (6)	Cuneta Astrodome	2–13
16	January 10	Talk 'N Text	99–97	Alonzo (23)	Najorda (8)	Alonzo, Chia (4)	Araneta Coliseum	3–13
17	January 17	Sta. Lucia	86–108	Aljamal (20)	Aljamal (11)	Belano, Dimaunahan (4)	Araneta Coliseum	3–14
18	January 20	Coca Cola	89–91	Crisano (19)	Alonzo (13)	Alonzo (6)	Cuneta Astrodome	3–15

2009–10 schedule

== Fiesta Conference ==
=== Eliminations ===
==== Standings ====
Pos	Team	W	L	PCT	GB	Qualification
1	Talk 'N Text Tropang Texters	15	3	.833	—	Advance to semifinals
2	San Miguel Beermen	13	5	.722 (Note: Second seed playoff: San Miguel 88, Derby Ace 83)	2	Advance to semifinals
3	Derby Ace Llamados	13	5	.722	2	Advance to quarterfinals
4	Alaska Aces	11	7	.611	4	Advance to quarterfinals
5	Barangay Ginebra Kings	9	9	.500 (Note: Fifth seed playoff: Barangay Ginebra 115, Rain or Shine 88)	6	Advance to quarterfinals
6	Rain or Shine Elasto Painters	9	9	.500	6	Advance to wildcard round
7	Coca-Cola Tigers	8	10	.444	7	Advance to wildcard round
8	Sta. Lucia Realtors	5	13	.278	10	Advance to wildcard round
9	Air21 Express	4	14	.222	11	Advance to wildcard round
10	Barako Energy Coffee Masters	3	15	.167	12	

Source: PBA.ph

== Transactions ==
=== Pre-season ===
Barako Bull Energy Boosters

Players Added

Via Draft

- Ronnie Matias
- Benedict Fernandez
- Edwin Asoro

Via Free Agency

- Yousif Aljamal (From Talk 'N Text)
- Donbel Belano
- MC Caceres
- Gilbert Lao (From Talk 'N Text)
- Jim Bruce Viray

Via Trade

- Rogemar Menor (From Burger King)
- Robert Reyes (From Talk 'N Text)
Players Lost

Via Free Agency

- John Arigo
- Mike Hopler (To San Miguel)
- Warren Ybañez
- Ronnie Matias
- Edwin Asoro

Via Trade

- Larry Rodriguez (To Coca Cola)
- Jojo Duncil (To Coca Cola)
- Gabby Espinas (To Sta. Lucia)
- Mike Hrabak (To Rain or Shine)
- Jeffrei Chan (To Rain or Shine)

=== Philippine Cup ===
October 12, 2009	To Burger King 4 first round picks from Barako Bull (2010, 2012) and Talk 'N Text (2013 and 2014). Cash considerations	To Barako Bull Orlando Daroya	To Talk 'N Text Japeth Aguilar

=== Fiesta Conference ===
May 14, 2010	To Sta. Lucia Ali Peek; Nic Belasco; Pong Escobal; Ogie Menor; Yousif Aljamal	To Talk 'N Text Ryan Reyes; Kelly Williams; Charles Waters	To Barako Energy Coffee Mark Isip; 2010 1st round pick from Talk 'N Text
