= Paulo Hubalde =

Filipino basketball player

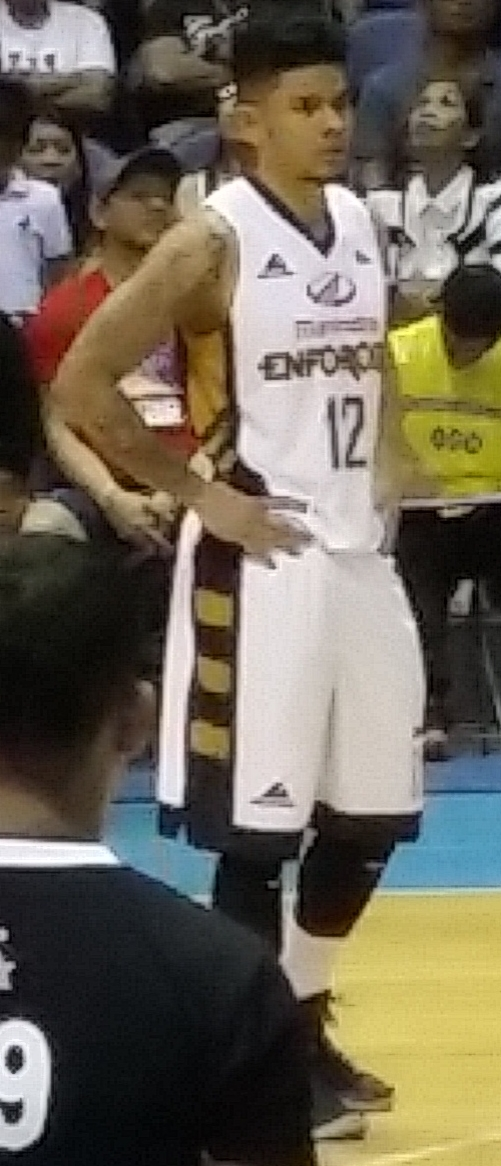

UE Red Warriors
- Title: Head coach
- League: UAAP

Personal information
- Born: January 24, 1981 (age 45) Quezon City, Philippines
- Listed height: 5 ft 11 in (1.80 m)
- Listed weight: 170 lb (77 kg)

Career information
- High school: Mapua (Manila)
- College: UE
- PBA draft: 2005: 1st round, 8th overall pick
- Drafted by: San Miguel Beermen
- Playing career: 2005–2025
- Position: Point guard / shooting guard
- Coaching career: 2025–present

Career history

Playing
- 2005–2006: San Miguel Beermen
- 2006–2007: Barangay Ginebra Kings
- 2008–2011: Barako Bull Energy Boosters
- 2011: San Miguel Beermen
- 2011–2012: Shopinas.com Clickers / Air21 Express
- 2012–2013: Petron Blaze Boosters / San Miguel Beermen
- 2013: San Miguel Beermen (ABL)
- 2013–2014: San Miguel Beermen
- 2014–2015: Barako Bull Energy
- 2015–2016: Mahindra Enforcer
- 2016–2017: Alab Pilipinas
- 2017: GlobalPort Batang Pier
- 2018–2020: Valenzuela Classic
- 2021: MJAS Zenith–Talisay Aquastars
- 2021–2022: Davao Occidental Tigers
- 2023: Quezon City Beacons
- 2023: Mindoro Disiplinados
- 2023–2024: RCP–Shawarma Shack Demigods
- 2024: Bulacan Kuyas
- 2024: Valenzuela Classic
- 2025: Cebu Classic / Greats

Coaching
- 2025–2026: UE Red Warriors (assistant)
- 2026–present: UE Junior Warriors
- 2026–present: UE Red Warriors (interim)

Career highlights
- 2× MPBL All-Star (2019, 2020); PSL champion (2022)

Dean Paulo Villegas Hubalde (born January 24, 1981) is a Filipino professional basketball player and coach who currently serves as head coach for the UE Red Warriors and UE Junior Warriors of the University Athletic Association of the Philippines (UAAP). He last played for the Cebu Greats of the Maharlika Pilipinas Basketball League (MPBL). He is the son of PBA great, Freddie Hubalde. Hubalde plays the guard position.

== College career ==
Hubalde played college basketball for the University of the East (UE) Red Warriors, playing alongside Paul Artadi, James Yap, Niño Canaleta, and Ronald Tubid.

== Professional career ==
Hubalde was drafted by the San Miguel Beermen in the 2005 PBA draft. He was San Miguel's lone draftee in 2005, drafting Hubalde with the intention of being an understudy for the aging Olsen Racela. His role diminished when the Beermen took in Brandon Cablay and played only eight games in that season in just five minutes a night of exposure.

Hubalde saw himself reuniting with coach Jong Uichico with the Barangay Ginebra Kings in a multi-player trade in the early part of the season. However, he was a third stringer in the point guard rotation after the Kings signed veteran Johnny Abarrientos to be the chief backup of Jayjay Helterbrand.

During the 2008–09 season, Hubalde was signed by the Barako Bull Energy Boosters, where he finally had the chance to prove his skills as an athletic point guard.

After the 2010–11 PBA Philippine Cup, he was acquired by the Beermen for a second stint. There he became a role player and helped the Cojuangco-owned franchise now known as the Petron Blaze Boosters win the 2011 PBA Governors' Cup against Talk 'N Text.

In the 2012 off-season, he and Magi Sison were involved in a three-team, seven player deal that sent Nonoy Baclao and Robert Reyes to Air21.

On November 12, 2014, Hubalde was traded by the San Miguel Beermen to Barako Bull Energy in exchange for Jeric Fortuna.

== Coaching career ==
On September 26, 2026, Hubalde was appointed head coach of the UE Red Warriors following the resignation of Chris Gavina during the early part of UAAP Season 89, having been part of his staff in the previous season.

== PBA career statistics ==
Legend
GP	Games played	MPG	Minutes per game
FG%	Field-goal percentage	3P%	3-point field-goal percentage	FT%	Free-throw percentage
RPG	Rebounds per game	APG	Assists per game	SPG	Steals per game
BPG	Blocks per game	PPG	Points per game	**Bold**	Career high

=== Season-by-season averages ===
Year	Team	GP	MPG	FG%	3P%	FT%	RPG	APG	SPG	BPG	PPG
2005–06	San Miguel	8	5.0	.000	.200	.000	1.1	.3	.1	—	.5
2006–07	Barangay Ginebra	6	3.2	**.500**	**.750**	.500	.2	.2	—	—	2.3
2008–09	Red Bull / Barako Bull	27	17.7	.461	.273	.846	**3.0**	2.0	.5	**.3**	**6.6**
2009–10	Barako Bull / Barako Energy Coffee	28	15.9	.387	.200	.750	2.8	2.0	**.8**	.1	4.9
2010–11	Barako Bull	**36**	13.4	.402	.071	.765	2.1	2.3	.4	.1	3.5
2010–11	San Miguel / Petron	**36**	13.4	.402	.071	.765	2.1	2.3	.4	.1	3.5
2011–12	Shopinas.com / Air21	31	**22.0**	.374	.267	.632	2.9	**3.4**	**.8**	.2	5.9
2012–13	Petron	6	8.3	.350	.143	**1.000**	1.3	.8	.7	—	2.8
2013–14	Petron / San Miguel	25	13.8	.403	.283	.667	1.6	1.3	.6	—	5.2
2014–15	San Miguel	31	11.9	.376	.115	.545	1.6	1.5	.5	—	3.3
2014–15	Barako Bull	31	11.9	.376	.115	.545	1.6	1.5	.5	—	3.3
2015–16	Mahindra	15	13.5	.339	.125	.286	2.1	.6	.5	.1	3.0
2016–17	GlobalPort	6	8.8	**.500**	—	**1.000**	.3	.5	.2	.2	1.0
Career		219	14.5	.395	.226	.696	2.1	1.8	.5	.1	4.3
