= Alli Austria =

Filipino basketball player (born 1990)

Personal information
- Born: December 7, 1990 (age 35) San Francisco, California, U.S.
- Listed height: 5 ft 11 in (1.80 m)
- Listed weight: 175 lb (79 kg)

Career information
- High school: St. Ignatius College Preparatory (San Francisco, California)
- College: Skyline College (2009–2011); San Francisco State University (2012–2013)
- PBA draft: 2015: 5th round, 44th overall pick
- Drafted by: Mahindra Enforcer
- Playing career: 2015–2017
- Position: Point guard

Career history
- 2015–2016: Pilipinas MX3 Kings
- 2016–2017: Singapore Slingers

Alexander Stanley A. "Alli" Austria (born December 7, 1990) is a Filipino-American former professional basketball player. He played college ball for the San Francisco State Gators. He then played in the ASEAN Basketball League for the Pilipinas MX3 Kings and the Singapore Slingers.

== Early life ==
Austria grew up in San Francisco. He became friends with Simon Enciso, and together they pursued a basketball career in the Philippines.

== College career ==
After playing high school basketball at St. Ignatius College Preparatory, Austria first played college basketball at Skyline College. Teaming up with Enciso, they played there from 2009 to 2011. In his sophomore year, Austria ranked 3rd in the state in assists and finished the season with over a 2:1 assist:turnover ratio. He also ranked 4th on the team in scoring and 2nd in steals. In his stint at Skyline, he reached 19th all-time in career assists.

Austria then transferred to play for the San Francisco State Gators. In his lone 2012–13 season, he helped them finish fourth in the CCAA conference.

== Professional career ==
=== Pilipinas MX3 Kings (2015–2016) ===
In 2013, Austria began playing in the semi-pro PBA D-League with the goal of making the PBA. Two years later, he was selected by the Mahindra Enforcer in the fifth round of the 2015 PBA Draft. However, he was unsigned by Mahindra and instead joined the Pilipinas Aguilas, who would later change their names to the Pilipinas MX3 Kings for sponsorship reasons.

=== Singapore Slingers (2016–2017) ===
By December 2016, Austria secured a roster spot with the Singapore Slingers through the help of former Slingers player Kris Rosales. However, he struggled to score in his first four games with them. He was eventually replaced by Josh Urbiztondo as the team's heritage import.

After this stint, Austria retired and joined the San Francisco Police Department.
