= Jay Washington =

Filipino-American basketball player

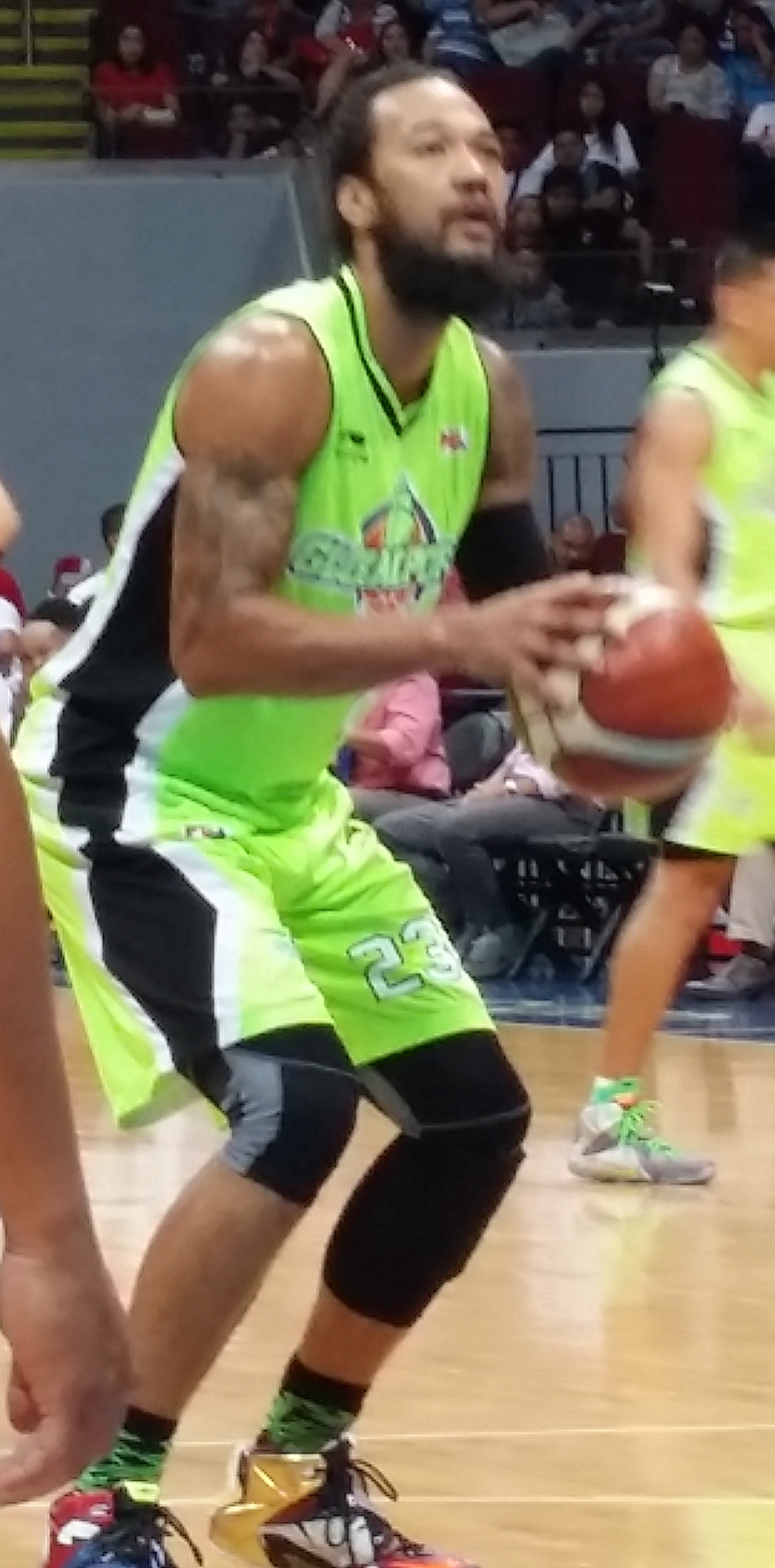
- Washington with the GlobalPort Batang Pier in 2015

Guangzhou Loong Lions
- Title: Assistant coach
- League: CBA

Personal information
- Born: November 10, 1981 (age 45) San Antonio, Zambales, Philippines
- Listed height: 6 ft 7 in (200 cm)
- Listed weight: 216 lb (98 kg)

Career information
- High school: Osbourn (Manassas, Virginia); Masters School (Dobbs Ferry, New York)
- College: Eckerd (2001–2004)
- PBA draft: 2005: 1st round1st overall
- Drafted by: Air21 Express
- Playing career: 2005–2023
- Position: Power forward

Career history

Playing
- 2005–2008: Talk 'N Text Phone Pals
- 2008–2013: San Miguel Beermen / Petron Blaze Boosters
- 2013–2014: GlobalPort Batang Pier
- 2014–2015: Talk 'N Text Tropang Texters
- 2015–2016: GlobalPort Batang Pier
- 2016–2018: Rain or Shine Elasto Painters
- 2019–2021: TNT KaTropa / TNT Tropang Giga
- 2021–2022: Blackwater Bossing
- 2022: Ryukyu Golden Kings
- 2022–2023: Yokohama Excellence

Coaching
- 2026–present: Guangzhou Loong Lions (assistant)

Career highlights
- 4× PBA champion (2009 Fiesta, 2011 Governors', 2015 Commissioner's, 2021 Philippine); 2× PBA Best Player of the Conference (2010 Fiesta, 2010–11 Philippine); 4× PBA All-Star (2009, 2011, 2013, 2017); 3× PBA Mythical First Team (2007, 2009, 2010); PBA Mythical Second Team (2011); PBL champion (2005 Unity); PBL Finals MVP (2005 Unity); 2x PBL Mythical First Team (2004-05 Open Championship, 2005 Unity)

Anthony Jamaul Washington (born November 10, 1981) is a Filipino-American professional basketball coach and former player who is an assistant coach for the Guangzhou Loong Lions of the Chinese Basketball Association. He spent the majority of his career in the Philippine Basketball Association (PBA), where he was selected first overall by the FedEx Express in the 2005 PBA draft. Throughout his PBA career, he was a four-time champion, two-time Best Player of the Conference awardee, four-time All-Star, and three-time Mythical First Team awardee. He last played for the Yokohama Excellence of the Japanese B.League before transitioning to coaching.

== College career ==
Born in Zambales, Philippines, Washington played for the Eckerd College Tritons during his college career. In 2002, he had per-game averages of 20.5 pts (on 36% 3PT shooting) and 3.9 rebs in 32 games. He then raised his averages to 21.7 pts and 5.5 rebs in 32 games the next season. For his senior season, Washington was named to the Sunshine State Conference All Tournament Team. Washington also suited up for the Gwinnett Grizzlies at the 2004 LA Summer Pro League.

== Professional career ==
Washington was selected 1st overall draft pick in 2005 PBA draft by the FedEx Express and was traded to the Talk 'N Text Phone Pals during draft day. Despite putting good numbers, high expectations and the deep rotation of Talk 'N Text led him to being traded to the San Miguel Beermen in 2008 in exchange for the draft rights of 2008 3rd overall pick Jayson Castro. During the 2010 PBA Fiesta Conference, he was awarded the Best Player of the Conference. He was then awarded another Best Player of the Conference award during game 4 of the 2010–11 PBA Philippine Cup finals.

On June 11, 2013, he was sent to the GlobalPort Batang Pier after a trade that also sent Japeth Aguilar to Barangay Ginebra.

On September 22, 2014, he was traded to the Talk 'N Text Tropang Texters for Nonoy Baclao, rookie Harold Arboleda and the rights for Talk 'N Text's 2nd-round pick in the 2018 draft. This trade is a part of a series of trades between Talk 'N Text, GlobalPort, and NLEX Road Warriors. He returned to Talk 'N Text after six years of playing with San Miguel/Petron and GlobalPort.

On October 13, 2016, he was traded to the Rain or Shine Elasto Painters in exchange for JR Quiñahan.

On February 21, 2019, after being released by Rain or Shine, he signed with TNT KaTropa for his third stint with the franchise.

On December 3, 2021, Washington, along with two future second-round picks, was traded to the Blackwater Bossing for Carl Bryan Cruz.

In June 2022 while he was still a free agent, Washington played 3x3 for Pretty Huge in a regional tournament in Thailand.

On September 8, 2022, Washington signed with Ryukyu Golden Kings of the Japanese B.League. He parted ways with the team on December 7, 2022.

On December 15, 2022, Washington signed with Yokohama Excellence of the Japanese B.League.

== Coaching career ==
After retiring, Washington became a personal trainer, working in different places in Asia. On August 12, 2026, the Guangzhou Loong Lions announced that Washington would be joining the team as a player development coach.

== PBA career statistics ==
Legend
GP	Games played	MPG	Minutes per game
FG%	Field-goal percentage	3P%	3-point field-goal percentage	FT%	Free-throw percentage
RPG	Rebounds per game	APG	Assists per game	SPG	Steals per game
BPG	Blocks per game	PPG	Points per game	**Bold**	Career high

As of the end of 2021 season

=== Season-by-season averages ===
Year	Team	GP	MPG	FG%	3P%	FT%	RPG	APG	SPG	BPG	PPG
2005–06	Talk 'N Text	18	15.1	.336	.152	.619	3.7	.9	.3	.4	5.3
2006–07	Talk 'N Text	**61**	29.0	**.475**	.241	.653	7.1	1.7	.6	.6	13.5
2007–08	Talk 'N Text	37	27.2	.458	.305	.692	7.4	1.8	.6	.8	12.6
2008–09	San Miguel	52	29.8	.473	**.352**	.647	7.5	2.1	.6	.6	12.8
2009–10	San Miguel	41	32.3	.435	.275	.820	7.1	1.9	.7	.5	14.6
2010–11	San Miguel / Petron	35	**35.0**	.410	.283	.662	**9.5**	**2.3**	.5	**1.1**	**15.9**
2011–12	Petron	14	27.3	.439	.351	.818	6.3	2.2	.8	.7	14.4
2012–13	Petron	41	26.5	.370	.273	.716	6.6	1.3	.4	.9	9.6
2012–13	GlobalPort	41	26.5	.370	.273	.716	6.6	1.3	.4	.9	9.6
2013–14	GlobalPort	28	33.3	.435	.325	.795	7.5	1.9	**1.1**	.5	15.6
2014–15	Talk 'N Text	47	19.6	.347	.276	.822	3.9	.9	.4	.4	7.0
2015–16	GlobalPort	36	25.5	.405	.280	.641	5.8	1.4	.8	.7	8.6
2016–17	Rain or Shine	27	20.1	.363	.244	.625	5.6	1.3	.6	.6	7.3
2017–18	Rain or Shine	24	12.2	.344	.200	.529	2.7	.9	.6	.0	3.5
2019	TNT	25	7.1	.298	.207	.615	1.8	.2	.3	.1	1.7
2020	TNT	20	14.3	.421	.268	.846	3.1	.7	.6	.7	4.3
2021	TNT	10	11.8	.238	.133	**1.000**	1.6	.8	.4	.5	1.4
2021	Blackwater	10	11.8	.238	.133	**1.000**	1.6	.8	.4	.5	1.4
Career		516	24.8	.421	.281	.704	6.0	1.5	.6	.6	10.3
