= Pilipinas MX3 Kings =

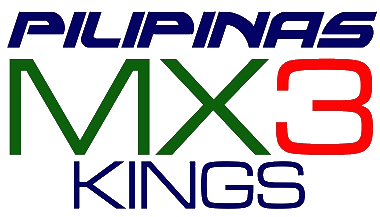
- Leagues: ASEAN Basketball League
- Founded: 2015
- Folded: 2016
- History: Mindanao Aguilas; Sept. 2015; Pacquiao Powervit Pilipinas Aguilas; Sept.–Nov. 2015; Pilipinas MX3 Kings; Nov. 2015–2016
- Arena: San Juan Gym; Malolos Convention Center
- Capacity: 2,000; 5,000
- Location: San Juan, Metro Manila, Philippines
- Main sponsor: MX3, Powervit and GoldLife
- President: Dick Balajadia
- Ownership: SportsLegends Managers Inc.

Pilipinas MX3 Kings, initially the Pacquiao Powervit Pilipinas Aguilas, were a Filipino professional basketball team that played in the ASEAN Basketball League (ABL). They only played one ABL season.

== History ==
The team was originally known as Mindanao Aguilas. After Manny Pacquiao became one of the team's owners, the name was changed to the Pacquiao Powervit Pilipinas Aguilas.

In October 2015, the Pilipinas Legends Group became a co-owner of the team and took over the team's management. The following month, the team was acquired by SportsLegends Managers Inc. and renamed to the Pilipinas MX3 Kings through a sponsorship arrangement with the DMI Medical Supply Co., Inc. The team was renamed after the withdrawal of Pacquiao, thus making the Pilipinas Legends/SportsLegends Group of Dick Balajadia the new majority owner. Jean Michael Alabanza was appointed as the new team manager and Chito Loyzaga as the team consultant. The team's home venue was the San Juan Gymnasium.

In December 2015, as part of the team overhaul, Sunday Salvacion, Jondan Salvador, Chad Alonzo, Emmerson Oreta, Adrian Celada and import Charles Mammie were released. Team manager Jean Michael Alabanza also announced that there will be a new world import. It was later announced that Jason Deutchman will be joining the team as one of its local players.

The team ended the 2016 ABL season in last place with a record of 2 wins and 18 losses, the worst by a Filipino team in the league's history.

== Home arenas ==
- USEP Gymnasium (2015 – played only one game there vs. Mono Vampire Basketball Club)
- San Juan Gym (2015–2016)
- Malolos Convention Center (2016)

== Final roster ==
Pilipinas MX3 Kings roster
Players
Coaches

Pos.	No.	Nat.	Name	Ht.	Wt.	Age
G	1	(Philippines)	Austria, Alli	5 ft 11 in (1.80 m)	175 lb (79 kg)	35 – 7 December 1990
F/C	2	(United States)	Creekmore, Will (I)	6 ft 9 in (2.06 m)	242 lb (110 kg)	37 – 9 April 1989
G	3	(Philippines)	Gamboa, Mike	5 ft 7 in (1.70 m)	170 lb (77 kg)	37 – 26 February 1989
G	4	(Philippines)	Elorde, Nico	5 ft 10 in (1.78 m)	155 lb (70 kg)	34 – 4 October 1991
C	5	(United States)	Fey, Michael (I)	7 ft 0 in (2.13 m)	270 lb (120 kg)	43 – 29 May 1983
F	10	(Philippines)	Deutchman, Jason	6 ft 6 in (1.98 m)	215 lb (98 kg)	38 – 27 September 1987
G	11	(Philippines)	Miller, Willie (C)	5 ft 11 in (1.80 m)	200 lb (91 kg)	49 – 13 July 1977
G	16	(Philippines)	Marata, Sam	6 ft 2 in (1.88 m)	198 lb (90 kg)	35 – 28 June 1991
G	22	(Philippines)	Salamat, Eric	5 ft 10 in (1.78 m)	190 lb (86 kg)	38 – 26 April 1988
G/F	33	(Philippines)	Acuña, Val	6 ft 4 in (1.93 m)	180 lb (82 kg)	39 – 24 November 1986
G	35	(Philippines)	King, Jerramy	6 ft 0 in (1.83 m)	165 lb (75 kg)	35 – 26 September 1990

Head coach

- (Philippines) Jack Santiago

Team manager

- (Philippines) Jean Michael Alabanza

Legend

- (C) Team captain
- (I) Import player
- Injured

== Notable players ==
- (United States) Arizona Reid
