= Magnolia Chicken Timplados Hotshots all-time roster =

Philippine basketball team roster

The following is a list of players, both past and current, who appeared at least in one game for the Purefoods/Coney Island/B-Meg Derby Ace/B-Meg/San Mig Coffee/San Mig Super Coffee/Star/Magnolia PBA franchise.

== A ==
Name	Position	School/university	Nickname	Season		Manner of entry	Ref.
Name	Position	School/university	Nickname	From	To	Manner of entry	Ref.
Aaron Aban	Guard / forward	Letran	Triple A	2008	2009	Free agency	
Gerrod Abram	Guard	Boston College	-	1995		1995 Governors' Cup import	
Freddie Abuda	Forward	Cebu	The Scavenger	1993	1994	1993 PBA draft	
Calvin Abueva	Forward	San Sebastian	The Beast	2021	present	Trade with Phoenix along with draft picks in exchange for Chris Banchero and draft picks.	
Alvin Abundo	Guard	Centro Escolar	-	2016	present	Free agency	
Kris Acox	Power forward	Furman	-	2017		2017 Governors' Cup import	
Val Acuña	Guard/forward	UE	-	2010; 2013	2012; 2014	2010 PBA draft	
Rommel Adducul	Center	San Sebastian	The General	2007	2011	Trade with Red Bull Barako in exchange for Don Camaso	
Jerrick Ahanmisi	Guard	Adamson	-	2021	present	2020 PBA draft	
Don Allado	Center	De La Salle	King Archer	2009; 2014	2011; 2015	Trade with Burger King along with Niño Canaleta for Chico Lanete, Beau Belga, and Richard Alonzo. Free agency	
Myron Allen	Guard	Lee CC	-	2011		2011 Governors' Cup import	
Alejo Alolor	Guard	-	Pongkee	1989		Free agency	
Richard Alonzo	Forward	Adamson	-	2008	2009	Free agency	
Lester Alvarez	Point guard	Adamson	-	2013	2016	Trade with Barako for JC Intal, Jonas Villanueva, and Aldrech Ramos	
Rich Alvarez	Forward	Ateneo	-	2008	2009	Trade from Red Bull for a 2011 first round pick	
Frechie Ang	Guard	-	-	1997		1997 PBA draft	
Harold Arceneaux	-	Weber State	The Show	2003			
Paul Artadi	Point guard	UE	Kid Lightning	2004; 2009	2007; 2010	2004 PBA draft; Trade with Ginebra	
Nelson Asaytono	Power forward	Manila	The Bull	1989	1991	1989 PBA draft	
Arthur Ayson	Point guard	-	Art	1992		Free agency	

== B ==
Name	Position	School/university	Nickname	Season		Manner of entry	Ref.
Name	Position	School/university	Nickname	From	To	Manner of entry	Ref.
Gido Babilonia	Center	UST	-	1990		1990 PBA draft	
Bonel Balingit	Center	Visayas	Yeyey	2002		Free agency	
Chris Banchero	Guard	Seattle Pacific	-	2019	2021	Trade with Alaska for Rodney Brondial & Robbie Herndon	
Mark Barroca	Point guard	Far Eastern	Coffee Prince, Flying B	2011	present	2011 rookie draft	
Boyet Bautista	Point guard	Letran	-	2006	2007	2006 rookie draft	
Courtney Beasley	Guard	-	-	2011		2011 Commissioner's Cup import	
Beau Belga	Forward / center	Philippine Christian	Big Beau	2008	2009	2008 PBA draft	
Egay Billones	Point guard	Las Pinas College	Billion Dollar Man	2005	2006	Trade with FedEx in exchange of future pick	
Marqus Blakely	Forward	Vermont	-	2012	2016	2015 Commissioner's Cup and 2012–16 Governor's Cup import	
Cris Bolado	Center	National-U	Jumbo	1997		Trade with Alaska in exchange of Rodney Santos and Bryant Punzalan	
Ken Bono	Forward / center	Adamson	-	2012	2013	Free agency	
Cinmeon Bowers	Power forward		-	2017		2017 Governors' Cup import	
Denzel Bowles	Forward / center	James Madison	Monster Bowles	2012; 2015	2013; 2016	2012–13, 2015–16 Commissioner's Cup import	
Adrian Branch	Forward	Maryland	-	1995		1995 Commissioner's Cup import	
Rodney Brondial	Forward / center	Adamson	-	2016	2019	Acquired via eight-man trade involving GlobalPort and Phoenix	
Loren Brill	Guard	Old Dominion	-	2021	present	Free agency	
Cliff Brown	Forward	Niagara	-	2010		2010 Fiesta Conference import	
Derrick Brown	Forward/Guard	Providence	Flight 32	1999	2002	1999–2001 Governors' Cup import	
Paolo Bugia	Forward / center	Ateneo	-	2008	2009	Free agency	
Michael Burtscher	Forward	Clearwater Christian	-	2009	2011	Free agency	

== C ==
Name	Position	School/university	Nickname	Season		Manner of entry	Ref.
Name	Position	School/university	Nickname	From	To	Manner of entry	Ref.
Boy Cabahug	Shooting guard	Visayas	-	1991	1993	Trade with Alaska Aces in exchange of Jojo Lastimosa	
Jessie Cabanayan	Guard	De Ocampo Memorial College	-	1999	2000	Free agency	
Sonny Cabatu	Center	PSBA	-	1989; 1997		Trade with Presto along with Pido Jarencio in exchange of Padim Israel, Willie Generalao and Totoy Marquez	
Brandon Cablay	Point guard	Vanguard	-	2007-08		Trade with Red Bull in exchange of future pick	
Michael Calisaan	Forward	San Sebastian	-	2019	2020	2018 PBA draft	
Don Camaso	Forward	Metro Manila Colleges	The Hammer	2005	2006	Free agency	
Niño Canaleta	Small forward	UE	KG	2009	2011	Trade with Burger King along with Don Allado for Chico Lanete, Beau Belga, and Richard Alonzo.	
Christopher Cantonjos	Center/forward	UST	-	2002	2003	Free agency	
Glenn Capacio	Guard	Far Eastern	Mr. No Nonsense	1988	1995	Concession	
Alvin Capobres	Guard / forward	San Sebastian	-	2020		2019 PBA draft	
Noy Castillo	Guard	The Citadel	The Golden Boy	2000	2008	Trade with Shell for a future pick	
Rysal Castro	Forward	-	-	2000		-	
JR Cawaling	Guard / forward	Far Eastern	The Sweet Shooter	2013	2014	2013 PBA draft	
Marquin Chandler	Power forward	San José State	-	2005–06; 2007; 2009		2005–06–2007 and 2009 Fiesta Conference	
Benny Cheng	Small forward	Mapúa	-	1993		1993 PBA draft	
Wayne Chism	Power forward / center	Tennessee	-	2018		2018 Commissioner's Cup import	
Gian Chiu	Center	Oberlin	-	2012	2013	2012 PBA draft	
Rakeem Christmas	Power forward	Syracuse	-	2019		2019 Commissioner's Cup import	
Emilio Chuatico	Guard	Ateneo	Nonoy	1995	1996	Trade with Ginebra in exchange of Vince Hizon	
Harmon Codiñera	Center	UE	-	1991		Free agency	
Jerry Codiñera	Center	UE	The Defense Minister	1988	1999	Concession	
Lorenzo Coleman	Center	Tennessee Tech	-	2005		Replacement for Antonio Smith	
Lenny Cooke	-	-	-	2003			
Jackson Corpuz	Forward	Philippine Christian	Pinoy Fukuda	2020	present	Trade with Columbian in exchange for Aldrech Ramos.	
Arturo Cristobal	Forward	Far Eastern	Bai	1990	-	Free agency	
Celino Cruz	Point guard	Far Eastern	-	2009		Trade with Burger King along with Niño Canaleta for Chico Lanete, Beau Belga, and Chad Alonzo.	
Mark Cruz	Point guard	Letran	The Antman	2015	2016	2015 PBA draft	

== D ==
Name	Position	School/university	Nickname	Season		Manner of entry	Ref.
Name	Position	School/university	Nickname	From	To	Manner of entry	Ref.
Rommel Daep	Forward	San Sebastian	-	1999	2001	1999 PBA draft	
Antonio Dela Cerna	Forward	-	-	1989		1989 rookie draft	
Gilbert Demape	Point guard	Cebu Tech	-	2003		Trade	
RR de Leon	Forward	UE	-	2021	present	2021 PBA draft	
Samboy de Leon	Forward	Centro Escolar	-	2016	2017	2015 rookie draft	
Yancy de Ocampo	Center	Saint Francis of Assisi	YDO, Big Slow	2012	2014	Trade with Barako Bull Energy for Rico Maierhofer	
Ramon Dela Cruz	Point guard	-	The Executioner	1988	1988	Concession	
Ruben Dela Rosa	Forward	Mapúa	-	1996	1997	1996 rookie draft	
Rome dela Rosa	Forward	San Beda	-	2016	present	Traded from Alaska in exchange for Jake Pascual	
Hernani Demegillo	Center	San Sebastian	Nani	1992		Free agency	
Joe Devance	Forward	UTEP	JDV	2011	2015	Trade with Air21 for Niño Canaleta and Jondan Salvador	
Aris Dionisio	Forward	St. Clare	-	2020	present	2019 PBA draft	

== E ==
Name	Position	School/university	Nickname	Season		Manner of entry	Ref.
Name	Position	School/university	Nickname	From	To	Manner of entry	Ref.
Egay Echavez	Guard	Misamis Institute	-			Free agency	
Eddie Elisma	Power forward/center	Georgia Tech	-	2004			
Jo Jo English	Shooting guard	South Carolina	-	1996		1996 Governors' Cup import	
Rudy Enterina	Point guard	-	-	1991	1993	1991 rookie draft	
Pong Escobal	Point guard	San Beda	-	2011		Dispersal draft	
Joselito Escobar	Center	UE	Jolly	2001	2002	Free agency	
Russel Escoto	Center/Power forward	Far Eastern	-	2022	present	Trade with Terrafirma for 2nd round pick	
Antonio Espinosa	Point guard	DLSU	Tony Boy	2004	2005	Free agency	
Rey Evangelista	Small forward	UST	Rey	1994	2009	1994 rookie draft	

== F ==
Name	Position	School/university	Nickname	Season		Manner of entry	Ref.
Name	Position	School/university	Nickname	From	To	Manner of entry	Ref.
Bernie Fabiosa	Point guard	UE	The Sultan of Swipe	1990		Free agency	
James Farr	Power forward	Xavier	-	2019		2019 Commissioner's Cup import	
EJ Feihl	Center	Adamson	EJ	1997	2001	Trade with Ginebra in exchange of Cris Bolado	
Jonathan Fernandez	Guard / forward	National-U	-	2008	2011	2008 rookie draft	
Henry Fernandez	Guard / forward	Visayas	-	1998	1999	1998 rookie draft	
Ramon Fernandez	Center / forward	San Carlos	El Presidente, Don Ramon, The Franchise	1988	1988	Concession	
Boyet Fernandez III	Point guard	Colegio San Agustin – Bacolod	-	1999	2003	Trade with Pop Cola	
John Ferriols	Power forward	USJ–R	-	2011	2012	Free agency	
John Fields	Center	Tennessee	-	2019		2019 Commissioner's Cup import	

== G ==
Name	Position	School/university	Nickname	Season		Manner of entry	Ref.
Name	Position	School/university	Nickname	From	To	Manner of entry	Ref.
Jerwin Gaco	Power forward	De La Salle	-	2010	2016	Free agency	
Bambam Gamalinda	Forward	San Beda	-	2017	2019	Trade with Blackwater along with Kyle Pascual in exchange for Allein Maliksi and Chris Javier	
Arnold Gamboa	Center	UE	-	2006		Free agency	
RR Garcia	Guard	Far Eastern	-	2016		Trade with Barako Bull	
Willie Generalao	Point guard	USJ-R, Visayas	The Court General	1988		Concession	
Derrick Gervin	Forward/Guard	Texas–San Antonio	-	1996		1996 Commissioner's Cup import	
Wesley Gonzales	Forward	Ateneo	Wild Wild Wes	2012	2013	Trade with Barako Bull for Josh Urbiztondo	
Ronnie Grandison	-	New Orleans	-	1993		Replacement (of Carey Scurry)	
Joselito Guanio	Forward	Philippines	-	1992	1993	1992 rookie draft	
Pedro Guerrero	Forward	Letran	-	2001	2002	2001 rookie draft	
Abet Guidaben	Center	USJ–R	-	1987	1988	Trade with San Miguel in exchange of Ramon Fernandez	

== H ==
Name	Position	School/university	Nickname	Season		Manner of entry	Ref.
Name	Position	School/university	Nickname	From	To	Manner of entry	Ref.
Roy Hairston	Guard/forward	-	-	1998		1998 Commissioner's Cup import	
Ray Hall	-		Sugar Ray	1988		-	
Brian Hamilton	Power forward	Louisiana	B-Ham	2009		2009 Fiesta Conference import	
Stefhon Hannah	Guard	Missouri	-	2011		2011 Governors' Cup import	
Mike Harris	Small forward	Rice	-	2021	2022	2021 Governors' Cup import	
Robbie Herndon	Small forward / Shooting guard	San Francisco State	-	2017	2019	Trade with GlobalPort during 2017 PBA Draft	
Darnell Hinson	Guard	Northeastern State	-	2011		2011 Governors' Cup import	
Malcolm Hill	Small forward	Illinois	-	2017		2017 Governors' Cup import	
Mark Hill	Guard	Cal State Fullerton	-	1996		1996 Governors' Cup import	
Vince Hizon	Forward	Ateneo	Vince The Prince	1994		Rookie Draft	
Richard Hollis	-	-	-	1991			
Isaac Holstein	Center	West Virginia State	-	2013-14	2014-15	Trade with GlobalPort Batang Pier for Justin Chua and Leo Najorda	
Dennis Hopson	Guard	Ohio State	-	1996		1996 Governors' Cup import	
Michael Hrabak	Forward	Central Arizona	-	2004-05		Traded from Shell in exchange for Ervin Sotto	
Freddie Hubalde	Forward	Mapúa	-	1988		Concession	

== I ==
Name	Position	School/university	Nickname	Season		Manner of entry	Ref.
Name	Position	School/university	Nickname	From	To	Manner of entry	Ref.
Padim Israel	Forward	Ateneo	-	1988		Concession	
JC Intal	Forward	Ateneo	The Rocket	2011-12	2013	Part of three-team trade involving Ginebra and Barako Bull in exchange for Kerby Raymundo and Dylan Ababou	
Byron Irvin	Import	-	-	1994			

== J ==
Name	Position	School/university	Nickname	Season		Manner of entry	Ref.
Name	Position	School/university	Nickname	From	To	Manner of entry	Ref.
Justin Jackson	Center / Power forward	Cincinnati	-	2018		2018 Commissioner's Cup import	
Pido Jarencio	Guard	UST	The Fireman	1989		Trade with Presto along with Sonny Cabatu in exchange of Padim Israel, Willie Generalao and Totoy Marquez	
Jio Jalalon	Guard	Arellano	Bus Driver, Cyclone	2016	present	2016 rookie draft	
Chris Javier	Power forward / center	UE	-	2016	2017	2016 rookie draft	
Khari Jaxon	Forward	New Mexico	-	1998		1998 Commissioner's Cup import	
Darryl Johnson	Point guard	Michigan State	-	1991			
Dwayne Johnson	-	-	-	1990			
Robert James Johnson	Point guard	Bellevue College	Rob, The Wizard	2004		Free agency	
Mike Jones	-	-	-	1998			

== K ==
Name	Position	School/university	Nickname	Season		Manner of entry	Ref.
Name	Position	School/university	Nickname	From	To	Manner of entry	Ref.
Curtis Kelly	Power forward/center	Kansas State	-	2018		2018 Commissioner's Cup import	
Abe King, Jr.	Center/forward	San Beda	Chairman of the Boards	1993	1994	Free agency	
Jesse King	Forward/center	Texas A&M	-	2007		Import	

== L ==
Name	Position	School/university	Nickname	Season		Manner of entry	Ref.
Name	Position	School/university	Nickname	From	To	Manner of entry	Ref.
Dwight Lago	Forward	De La Salle	-	1993		Rookie Draft	
Elmer Lago	Guard	De La Salle	-	1997	1998		
Chico Lanete	Point guard	Lyceum	Rocky Balboa	2007–2008	2009	Free agency	
James Laput	Center	-	-	2021	present	Trade with Terrafirma for Justin Melton and Kyle Pascual	
Ardy Larong	Forward	USJ–R	-	2007-08		Free agency	
Jojo Lastimosa	Shooting guard	USJ–R, Ateneo	Fourth Quarter Man	1988	1990	Concession	
Eddie Laure	Guard/forward	Adamson	The Dominator	2004-05		Trade with Shell and the 2004 PBA Draft no. 2 pick in exchange of Billy Mamaril	
Kurk Lee	Point guard	Towson	-				
Paul Lee	Guard	UE	Lee-thal Weapon	2016	present	Traded from Rain or Shine in exchange for James Yap	
Alejandro Lim	Forward	Visayas	-	1995		1995 rookie draft	
Braulio Lim	Forward	UE	Bolo	1999		Free agency	
Frankie Lim	Point guard	San Beda		1993	1994	Free agency	
Jun Limpot, Jr.	Forward/center	DLSU Green Archers	Big Deal	2003	2007	Trade with Ginebra for Andy Seigle and Rodney Santos	

== M ==
Name	Position	School/university	Nickname	Season		Manner of entry	Ref.
Name	Position	School/university	Nickname	From	To	Manner of entry	Ref.
Vernon Macklin	Center/Power forward	Florida	-	2018		2018 Commissioner's Cup import	
Ronnie Magsanoc	Point guard	Philippines	The Point Laureate	2001	2002	Free agency	
Ronald Magtulis	Guard / forward	Far Eastern	-	2003		Free agency	
Rico Maierhofer	Forward	De La Salle	Rico Mambo, The Kite	2009	2012	Rookie Draft	
Allein Maliksi	Forward	UST	Alleinsanity	2013	2017	Trade with Barako Bull in exchange for Wesley Gonzales and Chris Pacana and 2017 second round pick	
Alex Mallari	Guard	Lewis–Clark State	-	2013	2016	Trade with San Miguel Beermen	
Billy Mamaril	Center	Bakersfield	-	2003	2004	2003 rookie draft	
BJ Manalo	Guard	De La Salle	-	2002		Free agency	
Marcel Mangulabnan	Forward	-	-	2000		Free agency	
Dino Manuel	Forward/center	San Beda	-	2001		Free agency	
Manuel Marquez	Forward	San Beda	Totoy	1988	1989	Free agency	
Jojo Martin	Forward	Adamson	-	1995	1996	Free agency	
Ronnie Matias	Forward	Manila	Batas ni Matias	2014	2015	Trade with GlobalPort in exchange for Val Acuña	
James Mays	Power forward/center	Clemson	-	2014		2014 Commissioner's Cup import	
Tim McCalister	Shooting guard	-	-	1988		1988 Reinforced Conference Import	
Bob McCann	Forward	Morehead State	-	1998			
Jimmy McClain	Import	Central Arkansas	Jimmy Jam	1989			
Justin Melton	Point guard	Mount Olive	Quickmelt, The Minion	2013	2021	2013 rookie draft	
Marcus Melvin	-	NC State	-	2005		Replacement for Lorenzo Coleman	
Junel Mendiola	Point guard	PSBA	-	2002		2002 PBA draft	
Gryann Mendoza	Shooting guard	Far Eastern	-	2016	2018	Free agency	
Jenkins Mesina	Forward	San Beda	-	2003		2003 rookie draft	
Lance Miller	-	-	-	1998		1998 Governors' Cup import	
Tony Mitchell	Power forward	North Texas	-	2017		2017 Commissioner's Cup import	
Rodney Monroe	Shooting guard	NC State	-	2005			
Billy Moody	Guard	Letran	-	2002		2002 PBA Draft	
Chris Morris	Small forward	Auburn	-	2002			
Jose Cadel Mosqueda	Forward	-	Cadel	1997		Free agency	
Nndadubem Gabriel Muoneke		Georgia	Gabe	2002		Replacement (Kelvin Price)	

== N ==
Name	Position	School/university	Nickname	Season		Manner of entry	Ref.
Name	Position	School/university	Nickname	From	To	Manner of entry	Ref.
Leo Najorda	Forward	San Sebastian	-	2013		Trade with Barako for JC Intal, Jonas Villanueva, and Aldrech Ramos	
Peter Naron	Guard/forward	Visayas	-	1994	1995	1994 rookie draft	
Julius Nwosu	Import	Liberty	-	1999		1999 Commissioner's Cup import	

== O ==
Name	Position	School/university	Nickname	Season		Manner of entry	Ref.
Name	Position	School/university	Nickname	From	To	Manner of entry	Ref.
Daniel Orton	Power forward/center	Kentucky	-	2015		2015 Commissioner's Cup import	

== P ==
Name	Position	School/university	Nickname	Season		Manner of entry	Ref.
Name	Position	School/university	Nickname	From	To	Manner of entry	Ref.
Chris Pacana	Guard	Saint Francis of Assisi	-	2012	2013	Free agency	
Jake Pascual	Forward/center	San Beda	-	2015	2017	Trade with Barako	
Kyle Pascual	Center / Power forward	San Beda	-	2017	2021	Trade with Blackwater for Allein Maliksi and Chris Javier	
Ronald Pascual	Shooting guard/Small forward	San Sebastian	-	2015	2016	Trade with San Miguel	
Allen Patrimonio	Power forward	De La Salle	-			-	
Alvin Patrimonio	Power forward	Mapúa	Captain Lionheart	1988	2005	Concession	
Mick Pennisi	Power forward / center	Eastern Michigan	"Mick the Slick"	2014	2015	Trade with Barako Bull Energy in exchange for Ronnie Matias and Isaac Holstein	
Marc Pingris	Power forward	PSBA	Pinoy Sakuragi	2005; 2009	2008; 2019	Trade with FedEx in exchange of future pick; trade with Burger King for 2010 1st and 2nd round picks	
Jewel Ponferada	Center	National-U	-	2012	2013	2012 rookie draft	
Kelvin Price	-	-	-			Import	
Dindo Pumaren	PG	De La Salle	The Bullet	1989; 1996	1993; 2000	1989 rookie draft; trade	
Bryant Punzalan	C	Far Eastern		1996		Trade with San Miguel	

== Q ==
Name	Position	School/university	Nickname	Season		Manner of entry	Ref.
Name	Position	School/university	Nickname	From	To	Manner of entry	Ref.
Daren Queenan	-	Lehigh	-	1990		Import	

== R ==
Name	Position	School/university	Nickname	Season		Manner of entry	Ref.
Name	Position	School/university	Nickname	From	To	Manner of entry	Ref.
Olsen Racela	Point guard	Ateneo	Rah-Rah	1993	1996	1993 rookie draft	
Kevin Ramas	Center	Mapúa	-	1992	1993	1992 rookie draft	
Aldrech Ramos	Forward	Far Eastern	-	2012; 2016	2013; 2019	2012 rookie draft; Traded from Mahindra in exchange for Alex Mallari	
Ricardo Ratliffe (Note: Changed his name to Ra Gun-ah after he was naturalized)	Center	Missouri	-	2016	2017	2016 and 2017 Commissioner's Cup import	
Ferdinand Ravena	Guard/forward	UE	The Raven	1994	1997	Trade with San Miguel in exchange for Kevin Ramas	
Kerby Raymundo	Forward/center	Letran	The Kid	2002	2011-12	Trade (with Red Bull in exchange of future pick)	
Zaldy Realubit	Center	USJR	-	2004	2005	Free agency	
Rafi Reavis	Center	Coppin State	-	2009	present	Trade for Ginebra's Paul Artadi and rights to 2009 8th overall pick Chris Timberlake in exchange for Enrico Villanueva, Rich Alvarez, Celino Cruz, and Paolo Bugia.	
Kenny Redfield	Guard/forward	Michigan State	Mr. Triple Double	1994 1998		1994 PBA Commissioner's Cup and 1998 PBA Commissioner's Cup import	
Edmundo Reyes	Power forward	UST	-	1995	1999	1995 rookie draft	
Elmer Reyes	Forward	-	-	1992		Free agency	
Reda Rhalimi	-	Saint Mary's College	Red Lobster	2008		2008 PBA Fiesta Conference import	
Darius Rice	Power forward	Miami (FL)	Big Momma	2008 PBA Fiesta Conference		Import	
Topex Robinson	Point guard	San Sebastian	The Pitbull	2008	2009	Free agency	
Omanzie Rodriguez	Center	Mapúa	-	2007	2008	Free agency	
Matthew Rogers	Center / Power forward	Southwest Baptist	-	2013		2013 Commissioner's Cup import	
Robert Rose	-	-	-	1990		1990 PBA Third Conference import	
Warren Rosegreen	-	-	-	2002		2002 PBA Commissioner's Cup import	
Walker Russell	-	Western Michigan	-	1990		1990 PBA Third Conference import	

== S ==
Name	Position	School/university	Nickname	Season		Manner of entry	Ref.
Name	Position	School/university	Nickname	From	To	Manner of entry	Ref.
Jessie Saitanan	Forward	Mapúa	-	2020	2021	Free agency	
Jondan Salvador	Forward/center	St. Benilde	-	2005	2011	2005 rookie draft	
Victor Sanchez	Forward/center	Mapúa	Rambo	1988 Open Conference		Concession	
Ian Sangalang	Power forward	San Sebastian	The Silent Assassin	2013	present	2013 rookie draft	
Joey Santamaria	Power forward	De La Salle	-	1991	1993	1991 rookie draft	
Rodney Santos	Guard / forward	San Sebastian	The Slasher	19962003		1996 rookie draft; Free agency	
Robert Sanz	Forward	Philippine Christian	-	2007	2008	Free agency	
Genesis Sasuman	Point guard	Letran	Donking	1997	1999	1997 rookie draft	
Carey Scurry	Small forward	LIU Brooklyn	-	1993		1993 Commissioner's Cup Import	
Alvarado Segova	Forward	-	-	1999		Direct hire	
Andy Seigle	Center	New Orleans	-	1999	2003	Trade with Mobiline in exchange of Jerry Codiñera	
Dexter Shouse	Forward	South Alabama	-	1989		1989 Reinforced Conference import	
Peter June Simon	Shooting guard	Mindanao	Super Sub, Scoring Apostle	2004	2020	Free agency	
Antonio Smith	Forward	Michigan State	-	2005		2005 Fiesta Conference import	
Clinton Smith	-	Cleveland State	-			Import	
Al Solis	Guard	Visayas	-	1988	1990	Free agency	
Ervin Sotto	Forward/center	Saint Francis of Assisi	-	2004	2004	2004 rookie draft	
Bong Solomon	Forward/center	San Sebastian	-	1998		Free agency	
Shamari Spears	Center	NC State	-	2011		2011 Commissioner's CupImport	

== T ==
Name	Position	School/university	Nickname	Season		Manner of entry	Ref.
Name	Position	School/university	Nickname	From	To	Manner of entry	Ref.
Yousef Taha	Center	Mapúa	-	2014	2016	Trade with GlobalPort in exchange for Yancy de Ocampo	
Leoncio Tan, Jr.	Guard	-	-	1991	1992	Trade with Pop Cola in exchange for Al Solis	
Ulysses Tanigue	Point guard	San Sebastian	-	1998		Free agency	
Jack Tanuan	Center	Far Eastern	-	1988; 1995	1991; 1997	1988 rookie draft; draft day trade with Sta. Lucia in exchange of Chris Jackson	
Jay Taylor	Shooting guard	Eastern Illinois	-	1995		1995 Governors' Cup import	
Eugene Tejada	Forward	Chabot	-	2005	2006	Free agency	
David Thirdkill	Small forward / Shooting guard	Bradley	The Sheriff	1988		1988 Open Conference Import	
Ronnie Thompkins	Forward/center	Fort Hays State	-	1996		1996 Commissioner's Cup import	
Jahmar Thorpe	Power forward	Houston	-	2009		2009 Fiesta Conference Import	
Richie Ticzon	Point guard	Ateneo	The Velvet Hands	1994	1995	1994 rookie draft	
Chris Timberlake	Point guard	North Florida	C-Tim	2009	2011	picked 8th overall by Ginebra, traded to Purefoods along with Rafi Reavis and Paul Artadi in exchange for Rico Villanueva, Richard Alvarez and Celino Cruz	
Tony Tolbert	Forward/Guard	Detroit Mercy	-	1996		1996 Governors' Cup import	
Cedric Toney	-	-	-	1991		1991 Reinforced Conference Import	
Norbert Torres	Center/Power forward	De La Salle	The Bear	2015	2016	2015 rookie draft	
Kenny Travis	Guard/forward	New Mexico State	-	1988		1988 Reinforced Conference Import	
Romeo Travis	Power forward	Akron	-	2018 2019		2018 & 2019 Governors' Cup import	

== U ==
Name	Position	School/university	Nickname	Season		Manner of entry	Ref.
Name	Position	School/university	Nickname	From	To	Manner of entry	Ref.
Joshua Urbiztondo	Point guard	Fresno Pacific	The Fireball	2011	2012	Free agency	

== V ==
Name	Position	School/university	Nickname	Season		Manner of entry	Ref.
Name	Position	School/university	Nickname	From	To	Manner of entry	Ref.
Ludovico Valenciano	Guard	-	Naning	1989	1990	Free agency	
Al Vergara	Point guard	Saint Francis of Assisi	-	2009		Free agency	
Marc Stevens Victoria	Power forward/center	Far Eastern	-	2001	2003	Free agency	
Manny Victorino	Forward/center	-	-	1994	1995	Trade with Ginebra in exchange of Benny Cheng and Purefoods' 1995 first round pick	
Joshua Villapando	Forward	-	Jojo	1988	1989	Trade with Shell in exchange of Freddie Hubalde	
Enrico Villanueva	Center	Ateneo	Raging Bull	2008	2009	Four-team, five-player trade (with Coke, Magnolia and Ginebra)	
Jonas Villanueva	Guard	Far Eastern	Brother Jonas	2010	2012	Trade with SMB for Paul Artadi	

== W ==
Name	Position	School/university	Nickname	Season		Manner of entry	Ref.
Name	Position	School/university	Nickname	From	To	Manner of entry	Ref.
Lorrenzo Wade	Shooting guard/Small forward	San Diego State	Zo	2010		2010 Fiesta Conference Import	
Tony Washam, Jr.	Forward/center	Saint Vincent	-	2010		2010 Fiesta Conference Import	
Tyrone Washington	Forward/center	Mississippi State	-	2004		2004 Fiesta Conference Import	
Leonard White	Forward	Southern	-	2002		2002 Governors' Cup Import	
Kennard Winchester	Small forward / Shooting guard	Averett	-	1996		1996 Governors' Cup import	
Adrian Wong	Shooting guard	Ateneo	-	2022	present	Free agency	
David Wood	Center/forward	Nevada	-	2001		2001 Commissioner's Cup import	
Leon Wood	Guard	Cal State Fullerton	-	1994		1994 Governor's Cup import	
Joel Wright	Forward	Texas State	-	2016		2016 Governors' Cup import	

== Y ==
Name	Position	School/university	Nickname	Season		Manner of entry	Ref.
Name	Position	School/university	Nickname	From	To	Manner of entry	Ref.
Jose Bernardo Yango	Forward/center	-	JB		1988	Concession	
James Yap	Guard/forward	UE	Boy Thunder, King James, Big Game James,	2004	2016	2004 rookie draft	
Roger Yap	Point guard	USJR	-	2001; 2005	2002; 2012	2001 rookie draft, Trade with Air21 in exchange of future pick	
Richard Yee	Forward/center	UST	-	1999	2009	Local direct hire	
Perry Young	Shooting guard	Virginia Tech	-	1988		Import	

== Z ==
Name	Position	School/university	Nickname	Season		Manner of entry	Ref.
Name	Position	School/university	Nickname	From	To	Manner of entry	Ref.
Keith Zaldivar	Center	Adamson	-	2022	present	2022 PBA draft	
