= List of 2021 PBA season transactions =

This is a list of transactions that have taken place during the off-season and the 2021 PBA season.

== List of transactions ==
=== Retirement ===
Date	Name	Team(s) played (years)	Age	Notes	Ref.
January 24	Cyrus Baguio	Red Bull Barako (2003–2008); Burger King Whoppers (2008–2009); Barangay Ginebra Kings (2009–2010); Alaska Aces (2010–2016); Phoenix Fuel Masters (2016–2017); NLEX Road Warriors (2017–2019)	40		
January 25	Ronald Tubid	Shell Turbo Chargers (2003–2005); Air 21 Express/Barako Bull Energy Cola (2005–2007, 2012–2013); Barangay Ginebra Kings (2007–2012); Petron Blaze Boosters/San Miguel Beermen (2013–2017; 2018–2019); Kia Picanto/Columbian Dyip (2017–2018)	39	Tubid was hired as assistant coach of Terrafirma Dyip.	
February 1	Harvey Carey	Talk 'N Text Phone Pals/Talk 'N Text Tropang Texters/TNT Tropang Texters/Tropang TNT/TNT KaTropa/TNT Tropang Giga (2003–2020)	41		
March 21	JC Intal	Air 21 Express / Barako Bull Energy (2007–2009; 2013–2016); Barangay Ginebra Kings (2009–2012); B-Meg Llamados / San Mig Coffee Mixers (2012–2013); Phoenix Super LPG Fuel Masters (2016–2020)	37		
May 15	Jay-R Reyes	Welcoat Dragons / Rain or Shine Elasto Painters (2006–2011); Air21 Express (2011); Alaska Aces (2011–2012); Meralco Bolts (2012–2013); Barangay Ginebra San Miguel (2013–2015); San Miguel Beermen (2015–2017); Kia Picanto / Columbian Dyip (2017–2019); Phoenix Super LPG Fuel Masters (2020)	36		
May 25	Marc Pingris	FedEx Express (2004–2005); Purefoods Chunkee Giants / Purefoods Tender Juicy Giants / B-Meg Llamados / San Mig Super Coffee Mixers / Purefoods Star Hotshots / Star Hotshots / Magnolia Hotshots (2005–2008; 2009–2019); Magnolia Beverage Masters / San Miguel Beermen (2008–2009)	39		
December 29	Garvo Lanete	NLEX Road Warriors (2015–2017); Meralco Bolts (2017–2019); NorthPort Batang Pier (2019–2021)	32		

== Coaching changes ==
=== Offseason ===
Departure date	Team	Outgoing head coach	Reason for departure	Hire date	Incoming head coach	Last coaching position	Ref.
February 13	TNT Tropang Giga	Bong Ravena	Demoted to assistant coach	February 13	Chot Reyes	Talk 'N Text head coach (2008–2012)	
March 1	Rain or Shine Elasto Painters	Caloy Garcia	Appointed as consultant	March 1	Chris Gavina	Rain or Shine assistant coach (2018–2020)	

== Player movements ==
=== Trades ===
January
January 20	To Rain or Shine Elasto Painters: Bradwyn Guinto	To NorthPort Batang Pier: Sidney Onwubere; Clint Doliguez
February
February 2	To San Miguel Beermen: CJ Perez	To Terrafirma Dyip: Russel Escoto; Matt Ganuelas-Rosser; Gelo Alolino; 2020 San Miguel first-round pick (No. 8); 2022 San Miguel first-round pick
February 4	To Blackwater Bossing: Baser Amer; Bryan Faundo	To Meralco Bolts: Mac Belo
February 17	To Magnolia Pambansang Manok Hotshots: Calvin Abueva; 2020 Phoenix first-round pick (No. 10)	To Phoenix Super LPG Fuel Masters: Chris Banchero; 2020 Magnolia first-round pick (No. 6); 2020 Magnolia second-round pick (No. 18)
February 23	To Alaska Aces: Brian Heruela; 2020 Magnolia first-round pick (No. 6); 2020 NLEX second-round pick (No. 16); 2021 Phoenix first-round pick	To Phoenix Super LPG Fuel Masters: Vic Manuel; 2020 Alaska first-round pick (No. 7); 2020 Alaska second-round pick (No. 19)
March
March 5	To Barangay Ginebra San Miguel: Christian Standhardinger	To NorthPort Batang Pier: Greg Slaughter
March 11	To Blackwater Bossing: 2020 NLEX first-round pick (No. 4)	To NLEX Road Warriors: Don Trollano; Roi Sumang; Maurice Shaw; 2022 Blackwater second-round pick
March 11	To Blackwater Bossing: David Semerad; Simon Enciso; 2023 TNT first-round pick; 2024 TNT second-round pick	To TNT Tropang Giga: 2020 NLEX first-round pick (No. 4)
March 12	To Barangay Ginebra San Miguel: 2020 Terrafirma second-round pick (No. 13)	To NorthPort Batang Pier: Jerrick Balanza; 2020 Barangay Ginebra second-round pick (No. 24)
July
July 15	To Magnolia Pambansang Manok Hotshots: Russel Escoto	To Terrafirma Dyip: 2022 Magnolia second-round pick
September
September 28	To Terrafirma Dyip: Simon Enciso	To Blackwater Bossing: Rashawn McCarthy
October
October 12	To Blackwater Bossing: JVee Casio; Barkley Eboña	To Alaska Aces: Mike Tolomia; 2022 Blackwater second-round pick
November
November 5	To NorthPort Batang Pier: Michael Calisaan; Vic Manuel	To Phoenix Super LPG Fuel Masters: Sean Anthony; Sean Manganti; 2021 TNT second-round pick
November 8	To NorthPort Batang Pier: Arwind Santos	To San Miguel Beermen: Vic Manuel
November 9	To Barangay Ginebra San Miguel: Sidney Onwubere	To NorthPort Batang Pier: Arthur dela Cruz
November 13	To San Miguel Beermen: Simon Enciso	To Terrafirma Dyip: Alex Cabagnot
November 16	To Blackwater Bossing: Mike Ayonayon; Will McAloney	To NLEX Road Warriors: Marion Magat; 2023 Blackwater second-round pick
November 25	To Magnolia Pambansang Manok Hotshots: James Laput	To Terrafirma Dyip: Justin Melton; Kyle Pascual
December
December 3	To Blackwater Bossing: Jay Washington; 2022 NorthPort second-round pick; 2025 TNT second-round pick	To TNT Tropang Giga: Carl Bryan Cruz
December 4	To Meralco Bolts: Franky Johnson	To Rain or Shine Elasto Painters: Trevis Jackson
December 24	To Blackwater Bossing: Justin Melton	To Terrafirma Dyip: Ed Daquioag
February 2022
February 24	To NLEX Road Warriors: Justin Chua	To Phoenix Super LPG Fuel Masters: Kris Porter; 2021 NLEX second-round pick; 2022 NLEX first-round pick

=== Free agency ===
==== Signings ====
Player	Date signed	Contract amount	Contract length	New team	Former team	Ref
Juami Tiongson	December 20, 2020	Not disclosed	1 year	Terrafirma Dyip		
JP Calvo	December 20, 2020	Not disclosed	1 year	Terrafirma Dyip		
Reden Celda	December 20, 2020	Not disclosed	1 year	Terrafirma Dyip		
Jeepy Faundo	December 20, 2020	Not disclosed	1 year	Terrafirma Dyip		
Joseph Gabayni	December 20, 2020	Not disclosed	1 year	Terrafirma Dyip		
Eric Camson	December 20, 2020	Not disclosed	1 year	Terrafirma Dyip		
Rashawn McCarthy	December 20, 2020	Not disclosed	1 year	Terrafirma Dyip		
Bonbon Batiller	December 20, 2020	Not disclosed	1 year	Terrafirma Dyip		
Calvin Abueva	December 22	Not disclosed	3 years	Phoenix Super LPG Fuel Masters		
J. R. Quiñahan	January 6, 2021	Not disclosed	Not disclosed	NLEX Road Warriors		
Raul Soyud	January 6, 2021	Not disclosed	Not disclosed	NLEX Road Warriors		
Michael Miranda	January 6, 2021	Not disclosed	Not disclosed	NLEX Road Warriors		
Reynel Hugnatan	January 12	Not disclosed	1 year	Meralco Bolts		
Nonoy Baclao	January 12	Not disclosed	1 year	Meralco Bolts		
Jammer Jamito	January 12	Not disclosed	1 year	Meralco Bolts		
Mark Barroca	January 14	Not disclosed	3 years	Magnolia Pambansang Manok Hotshots		
RR Garcia	January 18	Not disclosed	2 years	Phoenix Super LPG Fuel Masters		
Justin Chua	January 21	Not disclosed	3 years	Phoenix Super LPG Fuel Masters		
Kris Porter	January 21	Not disclosed	Not disclosed	NLEX Road Warriors		
Will McAloney	January 21	Not disclosed	Not disclosed	NLEX Road Warriors		
Kenneth Ighalo	January 21	Not disclosed	Not disclosed	NLEX Road Warriors		
Bong Galanza	January 21	Not disclosed	Not disclosed	NLEX Road Warriors		
Paul Varilla	January 21	Not disclosed	Not disclosed	NLEX Road Warriors		
Jervy Cruz	January 25	Not disclosed	Not disclosed	NorthPort Batang Pier		
LA Revilla	January 25	Not disclosed	Not disclosed	NorthPort Batang Pier		
Renzo Subido	January 25	Not disclosed	Not disclosed	NorthPort Batang Pier		
Jonathan Grey	January 25	Not disclosed	Not disclosed	NorthPort Batang Pier		
Michael Cañete	January 27	Not disclosed	1 year	Meralco Bolts		
Simon Enciso	January 27	Not disclosed	2 years	TNT Tropang Giga		
Samboy de Leon	January 27	Not disclosed	1 year	TNT Tropang Giga		
Allein Maliksi	February 1	Not disclosed	Not disclosed	Meralco Bolts		
Carl Bryan Cruz	February 2	Not disclosed	Not disclosed	Blackwater Bossing		
Ron Dennison	February 2	Not disclosed	Not disclosed	Blackwater Bossing		
Greg Slaughter	February 4	Not disclosed	Not disclosed	Barangay Ginebra San Miguel	Barangay Ginebra San Miguel	
Jesper Ayaay	February 8	Not disclosed	Not disclosed	Barangay Ginebra San Miguel	Alaska Aces	
Glenn Khobuntin	February 8	Not disclosed	1 year	TNT Tropang Giga	Terrafirma Dyip	
Paolo Taha	February 9	Not disclosed	Not disclosed	NorthPort Batang Pier		
Nico Elorde	February 9	Not disclosed	Not disclosed	NorthPort Batang Pier		
Dave Marcelo	February 11	Not disclosed	2 years	TNT Tropang Giga	Phoenix Super LPG Fuel Masters	
Chris Exciminiano	February 11	Not disclosed	1 year	TNT Tropang Giga	Rain or Shine Elasto Painters	
Almond Vosotros	February 11	Not disclosed	1 year	TNT Tropang Giga	TNT Tropang Giga	
Lervin Flores	February 11	Not disclosed	1 year	TNT Tropang Giga	TNT Tropang Giga	
Chris Javier	February 14	Not disclosed	Not disclosed	TNT Tropang Giga	TNT Tropang Giga	
Jansen Rios	February 15	Not disclosed	2 years	Phoenix Super LPG Fuel Masters		
Gab Banal	February 18	Not disclosed	1 year	Alaska Aces	NorthPort Batang Pier	
Jeron Teng	February 19	Not disclosed	3 years	Alaska Aces	Alaska Aces	
Yousef Taha	February 19	Not disclosed	1 year	Alaska Aces	TNT Tropang Giga	
AC Soberano	February 20	Not disclosed	1 year	NLEX Road Warriors		
Kyles Lao	February 20	Not disclosed	1 year	NLEX Road Warriors		
Scottie Thompson	March 12	₱420,000 per month (max. contract)	3 years	Barangay Ginebra San Miguel		
Brian Heruela	March 12	Not disclosed	1 year	TNT Tropang Giga	Phoenix Super LPG Fuel Masters	
Aljon Mariano	March 13	Not disclosed	Not disclosed	Barangay Ginebra San Miguel		
KG Canaleta	March 17	Not disclosed	Not disclosed	Blackwater Bossing	Blackwater Bossing	
Kelly Nabong	March 25	Not disclosed	6 months	Blackwater Bossing	NorthPort Batang Pier	
Jeepy Faundo	May 13	Not disclosed	Not disclosed	Terrafirma Dyip	Blackwater Bossing	
Marion Magat	May 14	Not disclosed	1 year	Blackwater Bossing		
Frank Golla	May 14	Not disclosed	1 year	Blackwater Bossing		
Jonjon Gabriel	May 14	Not disclosed	1 year	Blackwater Bossing		
Alfrancis Tamsi	June 20	Not disclosed	Not disclosed	Phoenix Super LPG Fuel Masters	KCS Computer Specialist Mandaue City (Pilipinas VisMin Super Cup)	
James Sena	June 23	Not disclosed	1 year	San Miguel Beermen	Blackwater Elite	
Alfonzo Gotladera	June 23	Not disclosed	1 year	San Miguel Beermen	Pasig Sta. Lucia Realtors (Maharlika Pilipinas Basketball League)	
Val Chauca	September 30	Not disclosed	Not disclosed	Blackwater Bossing	—N/a	
Kelly Nabong	October 6	Not disclosed	Rest of the season	Blackwater Bossing	Blackwater Bossing	
Juneric Baloria	October 15	Not disclosed	1 conference	Blackwater Bossing	Basilan Peace Riders (Pilipinas VisMin Super Cup)	
Rey Nambatac	November 3	₱420,000 per month (max. contract)	3 years	Rain or Shine Elasto Painters		
Nico Salva	November 12	Not disclosed	1 conference	Phoenix Super LPG Fuel Masters	Meralco Bolts	
Kris Rosales	November 16	Not disclosed	1 year	NLEX Road Warriors	Rain or Shine Elasto Painters	
Gab Banal	November 21	Not disclosed	2 years	TNT Tropang Giga	Alaska Aces	
Stanley Pringle	November 23	Not disclosed	3 years	Barangay Ginebra San Miguel		
Norbert Torres	November 24	Not disclosed	2 years	Rain or Shine Elasto Painters		
Anton Asistio	November 24	Not disclosed	2 years	Rain or Shine Elasto Painters		
Simon Camacho	November 25	Not disclosed	Not disclosed	Phoenix Super LPG Fuel Masters	Medical Depot (FilBasket)	
Beau Belga	November 26	Not disclosed	2 years	Rain or Shine Elasto Painters		
Rome dela Rosa	November 27	Not disclosed	3 years	Magnolia Pambansang Manok Hotshots		
Russel Escoto	November 30	Not disclosed	1 year	Magnolia Pambansang Manok Hotshots		
Jackson Corpuz	December 13	Not disclosed	2 years	Magnolia Pambansang Manok Hotshots		
Barkley Eboña	December 30	Not disclosed	2 years	Blackwater Bossing	Blackwater Bossing	
Baser Amer	December 30	Not disclosed	1 year	Blackwater Bossing	Blackwater Bossing	
John Ambulodto	December 30	Not disclosed	Not disclosed	Blackwater Bossing	Manila Stars (Maharlika Pilipinas Basketball League)	
Paul Desiderio	January 2, 2022	Not disclosed	1 year	Blackwater Bossing	Blackwater Bossing	
JVee Casio	January 3	Not disclosed	1 year	Blackwater Bossing	Blackwater Bossing	
Christian Standhardinger	January 5	Not disclosed	3 years	Barangay Ginebra San Miguel		
Japeth Aguilar	January 6	Not disclosed	3 years	Barangay Ginebra San Miguel		
Rodney Brondial	January 6	Not disclosed	3 years	San Miguel Beermen	Alaska Aces	
John Pinto	January 7	Not disclosed	3 years	Barangay Ginebra San Miguel	Meralco Bolts	
Jericho Cruz	January 20	Not disclosed	2 months	NLEX Road Warriors		
Rey Mark Acuno	January 21	Not disclosed	Not disclosed	TNT Tropang Giga	Blackwater Bossing	
Matt Ganuelas-Rosser	January 21	Not disclosed	Not disclosed	TNT Tropang Giga	Terrafirma Dyip	
James Yap	January 23	Not disclosed	1 conference	Rain or Shine Elasto Painters		
Carl Bryan Cruz	January 25	Not disclosed	1 year	TNT Tropang Giga		
Kevin Ferrer	January 27	₱420,000 per month (max. contract)	2 years	NorthPort Batang Pier		
Chris Banchero	February 2	Not disclosed	3 years	Meralco Bolts	Phoenix Super LPG Fuel Masters	
Prince Caperal	February 2	Not disclosed	2 years	Barangay Ginebra San Miguel		
Mike Nieto	February 4	Not disclosed	2 years	Rain or Shine Elasto Painters	—N/a	
Bryan Faundo	February 5	Not disclosed	1 conference	Alaska Aces	Bulacan Kuyas (Maharlika Pilipinas Basketball League)	
Andreas Cahilig	February 6	Not disclosed	2 years	Terrafirma Dyip		
Rey Suerte	February 7	Not disclosed	2 years	Blackwater Bossing	—N/a	
Richard Escoto	February 7	Not disclosed	2 years	Blackwater Bossing	Blackwater Bossing	
Adrian Wong	February 7	Not disclosed	2 years	Magnolia Pambansang Manok Hotshots	Rain or Shine Elasto Painters	
Allyn Bulanadi	February 7	Not disclosed	Not disclosed	Alaska Aces	—N/a	
Maurice Shaw	February 7	Not disclosed	Not disclosed	Barangay Ginebra San Miguel	Blackwater Elite	
Roi Sumang	February 7	Not disclosed	1 conference	NorthPort Batang Pier	Nueva Ecija Rice Vanguards (Maharlika Pilipinas Basketball League)	
Alvin Abundo	February 7	Not disclosed	1 conference	NorthPort Batang Pier	San Juan Knights (Maharlika Pilipinas Basketball League)	
Cris Dumapig	February 7	Not disclosed	1 conference	NorthPort Batang Pier	Zamboanga Sibugay Warriors (Pilipinas VisMin Super Cup)	
Matt Nieto	February 8	Not disclosed	3 years	NLEX Road Warriors	—N/a	
Paolo Taha	February 9	Not disclosed	3 years	NorthPort Batang Pier		
Justin Melton	February 9	Not disclosed	1 year	Blackwater Bossing		
Billy Robles	February 9	Not disclosed	Not disclosed	Phoenix Super LPG Fuel Masters	Davao Occidental Tigers (Maharlika Pilipinas Basketball League)	
Isaac Go	February 10	Not disclosed	2 years	Terrafirma Dyip	—N/a	
Jervy Cruz	February 10	Not disclosed	Not disclosed	NorthPort Batang Pier		
Jake Pascual	February 11	Not disclosed	2 years	Phoenix Super LPG Fuel Masters		
Robert Bolick	February 11	₱420,000 per month (max. contract)	1 year	NorthPort Batang Pier		
Jericho Cruz	March 1	Not disclosed	3 years	San Miguel Beermen	NLEX Road Warriors	
J. R. Quiñahan	March 8	₱420,000 per month (max. contract)	1 year	NLEX Road Warriors		
Andrei Caracut	March 11	Not disclosed	2 years	Rain or Shine Elasto Painters		
RJ Jazul	April 14	Not disclosed	2 years	Phoenix Super LPG Fuel Masters		
Sean Manganti	April 14	Not disclosed	2 years	Phoenix Super LPG Fuel Masters		
Alex Cabagnot	April 14	Not disclosed	2 years	Terrafirma Dyip		
Player	Date signed	Contract amount	Contract length	New team	Former team	Ref

=== Released ===
Player	Date waived	Former team	Ref
Ryan Araña	February 8, 2021	Rain or Shine Elasto Painters	
Abel Galliguez	February 8, 2021	Alaska Aces	
Yutien Andrada	February 8, 2021	Alaska Aces	
Dave Marcelo	February 11	Phoenix Super LPG Fuel Masters	
Jesse Saitanan	February	Magnolia Pambansang Manok Hotshots	
Michael Calisaan	February	Magnolia Pambansang Manok Hotshots	
Kelly Nabong	March 23	NorthPort Batang Pier	
Nico Salva	March 26	Meralco Bolts	
Jason Ballesteros	March 26	Meralco Bolts	
Billy Mamaril	March 31	San Miguel Beermen	
Alex Mallari	March 31	Phoenix Super LPG Fuel Masters	
Jeepy Faundo	April 1	NorthPort Batang Pier	
Jay-R Reyes	April 4	Phoenix Super LPG Fuel Masters	
Diego Dario	June 11	Blackwater Bossing	
