= 2014–15 Barako Bull Energy season =

- Head coach: Koy Banal
- General Manager: Raymond Rodriguez
- Owner(s): Energy Food and Drinks Inc.

Philippine Cup results
- Record: 4–7 (36.4%)
- Place: 9th
- Playoff finish: Quarterfinalist (lost to Talk 'N Text in one game with twice-to-win disadvantage)

Commissioner's Cup results
- Record: 5–6 (45.5%)
- Place: 7th
- Playoff finish: Quarterfinalist (lost to Talk 'N Text in one game with twice-to-win disadvantage)

Governors' Cup results
- Record: 6–5 (54.5%)
- Place: 6th
- Playoff finish: Quarterfinalist (lost to Rain or Shine in one game with twice-to-win disadvantage)

Barako Bull Energy seasons

The 2014–15 Barako Bull Energy season was the 13th season of the franchise in the Philippine Basketball Association (PBA).

== Key dates ==
- August 24: The 2014 PBA Draft took place in Midtown Atrium, Robinson Place Manila.
- October 18: Barako Bull Energy fired head coach Siot Tanquingcen. He was replaced by assistant coach Koy Banal

== Draft picks ==
Round	Pick	Player	Position	Nationality	PBA D-League team	College
1	8	Jake Pascual	C/F	Philippines	NLEX (D-League)	SBC
1	10	David Semerad	C/F	Australia	Zambales M-Builders	SBC
2	3	Philip Paredes	F/C	Philippines	Cebuana Lhuillier Gems	DLSU
2	6	Philip Morrison	G	United States	none	Asbury
2	10	Gab Banal	F	Philippines	Cebuana Lhuiller Gems	MIT

== Roster ==
2014–15 Barako Bull Energy roster
Players
Coaches

Pos.	#	POB	Name	Height	Weight	DOB (YYYY–MM–DD)	From
G/F	1	(Canada)	James Forrester	6 ft 2 in (1.88 m)	190 lb (86 kg)	1989-09-03	Arellano
F	5	(Philippines)	Jondan Salvador	6 ft 4 in (1.93 m)	210 lb (95 kg)	1980-10-12	St. Benilde
F	7	(Philippines)	JC Intal (C)	6 ft 5 in (1.96 m)	195 lb (88 kg)	1983-11-18	Ateneo
G	8	(Philippines)	RR Garcia	5 ft 11 in (1.80 m)	165 lb (75 kg)	1990-01-12	Far Eastern
G	9	(Philippines)	Joseph Yeo	6 ft 1 in (1.85 m)	175 lb (79 kg)	1983-09-07	De La Salle
G	12	(Philippines)	Paolo Hubalde	6 ft 1 in (1.85 m)	170 lb (77 kg)	1981-01-24	UE
G	13	(Philippines)	Brian Heruela (R)	5 ft 11 in (1.80 m)	195 lb (88 kg)	1989-04-13	Cebu
F	14	(Philippines)	Nico Salva	6 ft 4 in (1.93 m)	175 lb (79 kg)	1990-03-08	Ateneo
F	15	(Philippines)	Jake Pascual (R)	6 ft 4 in (1.93 m)	205 lb (93 kg)	1988-11-13	San Beda
C	18	(Philippines)	Justin Chua	6 ft 6 in (1.98 m)	245 lb (111 kg)	1989-07-13	Ateneo
C	21	(Philippines)	Philip Paredes (R/IN)	6 ft 6 in (1.98 m)	200 lb (91 kg)	1992-01-12	De La Salle
G	26	(Philippines)	Chico Lanete	6 ft 1 in (1.85 m)	180 lb (82 kg)	1979-08-01	Lyceum
F	28	(United States)	Willy Wilson	6 ft 4 in (1.93 m)	200 lb (91 kg)	1980-01-30	De La Salle
C	35	(United States)	Isaac Holstein (IN)	6 ft 10 in (2.08 m)	205 lb (93 kg)	1987-09-07	West Virginia State
G	42	(Philippines)	Paul Sorongon	6 ft 1 in (1.85 m)	178 lb (81 kg)	1985-12-12	Philippines
F	99	(Philippines)	Rico Maierhofer	6 ft 6 in (1.98 m)	175 lb (79 kg)	1985-11-04	De La Salle

Head coach

- (Philippines) Koy Banal (Mapúa)

Assistant coach(es)

- (Philippines) Art dela Cruz (San Sebastian)
- Jigs Mendoza (Philippines)
- (Philippines) Paolo Rivero (Adamson)
- (United States) Nic Belasco (Notre Dame de Namur)

Team manager

- (Philippines) Raymond Rodriguez

Legend

- (C) Team captain
- (CI) Commissioner's Cup Import
- (GI) Governors' Cup Import
- (EI) EASL Import
- (DP) Unsigned draft pick
- (FA) Free agent
- (IN) Inactive
- (S) Suspended
- (R) Rookie
- Injured

Roster

== Philippine Cup ==
=== Eliminations ===
==== Standings ====
Pos	Team	W	L	PCT	GB	Qualification
1	San Miguel Beermen	9	2	.818 (Note: Head-to-head record: San Miguel 1–0 Rain or Shine)	—	Advance to semifinals
2	Rain or Shine Elasto Painters	9	2	.818	—	Advance to semifinals
3	Alaska Aces	8	3	.727 (Note: Head-to-head record: Alaska 1–0 Talk 'N Text)	1	Twice-to-beat in the quarterfinals
4	TNT Tropang Texters	8	3	.727	1	Twice-to-beat in the quarterfinals
5	Barangay Ginebra San Miguel	6	5	.545 (Note: Head-to-head quotient: Barangay Ginebra 1.07, Meralco 1.06, Purefoods Star 0.89)	3	Twice-to-beat in the quarterfinals
6	Meralco Bolts	6	5	.545	3	Twice-to-beat in the quarterfinals
7	Purefoods Star Hotshots	6	5	.545	3	Twice-to-win in the quarterfinals
8	GlobalPort Batang Pier	5	6	.455	4	Twice-to-win in the quarterfinals
9	Barako Bull Energy	4	7	.364 (Note: Head-to-head record: Barako Bull 1–0 NLEX)	5	Twice-to-win in the quarterfinals
10	NLEX Road Warriors	4	7	.364	5	Twice-to-win in the quarterfinals
11	Kia Sorento	1	10	.091	8	
12	Blackwater Elite	0	11	.000	9	

Source: PBA.ph

=== Playoffs ===
==== Bracket ====
Quarterfinals (1st phase)
(#3 twice to beat)
3	Alaska	82
10	NLEX	78
(#6 twice to beat)
6	Meralco	77
7	Purefoods Star	65
(#4 twice to beat)
4	Talk 'N Text	105
9	Barako Bull	76
(#5 twice to beat)
5	Barangay Ginebra	95
8	GlobalPort	78

Quarterfinals (2nd phase) (single elimination)
3	Alaska	87
6	Meralco	69
4	Barangay Ginebra	97
5	Talk N' Text	83

Semifinals (best-of-7)
2	Rain or Shine	2
3	Alaska	4
1	Barangay Ginebra	4
4	San Miguel	0

Finals (best-of-7)
3	Alaska	3
1	Barangay Ginebra	4

== Commissioner's Cup ==
=== Eliminations ===
==== Standings ====
Pos	Team	W	L	PCT	GB	Qualification
1	Rain or Shine Elasto Painters	8	3	.727 (Note: Head-to-head quotient: Rain or Shine 1.025, Talk 'N Text 1.010, Purefoods 0.969)	—	Twice-to-beat in the quarterfinals
2	Talk 'N Text Tropang Texters	8	3	.727	—	Twice-to-beat in the quarterfinals
3	Purefoods Star Hotshots	8	3	.727	—	Best-of-three quarterfinals
4	NLEX Road Warriors	6	5	.545 (Note: Head-to-head record: NLEX 1–0 Meralco)	2	Best-of-three quarterfinals
5	Meralco Bolts	6	5	.545	2	Best-of-three quarterfinals
6	Alaska Aces	5	6	.455 (Note: Head-to-head quotient: Alaska 1.021, Barako Bull 1.019, Barangay Ginebra 0.960)	3	Best-of-three quarterfinals
7	Barako Bull Energy	5	6	.455	3	Twice-to-win in the quarterfinals
8	Barangay Ginebra San Miguel	5	6	.455	3	Twice-to-win in the quarterfinals
9	San Miguel Beermen	4	7	.364 (Note: Head-to-head quotient: San Miguel 1.011, GlobalPort 0.995, Kia 0.994)	4	
10	GlobalPort Batang Pier	4	7	.364	4	
11	Kia Carnival	4	7	.364	4	
12	Blackwater Elite	3	8	.273	5	

Source: PBA.ph

=== Playoffs ===
==== Bracket ====
Quarterfinals
(#1 twice-to-beat)
1	Rain or Shine	92
8	Barangay Ginebra	91
(best-of-3)
4	NLEX	0
5	Meralco	2
(#2 twice-to-beat)
2	Talk 'N Text	127
7	Barako Bull	97
(best-of-3)
3	Purefoods Star	2
6	Alaska	0

Semifinals (best-of-5)
1	Rain or Shine	3
5	Meralco	0
2	Talk 'N Text	3
3	Purefoods Star	1

Finals (best-of-7)
1	Rain or Shine	3
2	Talk 'N Text	4

== Transactions ==
=== Trades ===
==== Draft day ====
August 24, 2014	To Barako Bull Jojo Duncil; Chico Lanete; Gab Banal (second round pick, from San Miguel)	To San Miguel Ronald Pascual (first round pick, from Barako); 2016 first round pick (from Barako)

==== Philippine Cup ====
November 11, 2014	To Barako Bull Paolo Hubalde	To San Miguel Jeric Fortuna
December 6, 2014	To Barako Bull Isaac Holstein; Ronnie Matias	To Purefoods Star Mick Pennisi
January 8, 2015	To Barako Bull Sol Mercado	To GlobalPort Denok Miranda; 2016 2nd round pick

==== Commissioner's Cup ====
February 3, 2015	To Barako Bull Justin Chua (from San Miguel); 2017 1st round pick (from San Miguel)	To Barangay Ginebra Dorian Peña (from Barako Bull); 2015 2nd round pick (from Barako Bull)	To San Miguel JR Reyes (from Barangay Ginebra)

March 31, 2015	To Barako Bull Energy James Forrester; Dylan Ababou	To Barangay Ginebra 2015 first round pick
April 6, 2015	To Barako Bull Energy Billy Mamaril	To Barangay Ginebra Dave Marcelo
April 6, 2015	To Barako Bull Energy Rico Maierhofer	To San Miguel Billy Mamaril (traded to GlobalPort)

=== Recruited imports ===
Tournament	Name	Debuted	Last game	Record
Commissioner's Cup	Solomon Alabi	January 28 (vs Blackwater)	March 28 (vs Talk 'N Text)	5–7
Governors' Cup	Liam McMorrow	May 6 (vs NLEX)	June 27 (vs Rain or Shine)	6–6
