= 2014–15 Star Hotshots season =

- Head coach: Tim Cone
- Owners: San Miguel-Pure Foods Co., Inc. (a San Miguel Corporation subsidiary)

Philippine Cup results
- Record: 6–5 (54.5%)
- Place: 5th
- Playoff finish: Quarterfinalist (lost to Meralco in one game with twice-to-win disadvantage)

Commissioner's Cup results
- Record: 8–3 (72.7%)
- Place: 1st
- Playoff finish: Semifinalist (lost to Talk 'N Text, 1–3)

Governors' Cup results
- Record: 6–5 (54.5%)
- Place: 5th
- Playoff finish: Semifinalist (lost to Alaska, 0–3)

Star Hotshots seasons

The 2014–15 Star Hotshots season was the 27th season of the franchise in the Philippine Basketball Association (PBA).

== Key dates ==
- August 24: The 2014 PBA draft took place in Midtown Atrium, Robinson Place Manila.
- October 15: Team officials announced that the team will be renamed as the Purefoods Star Hotshots starting this season's Philippine Cup.
- October 22: The Grand Slam championship ring ceremony of the team was held before the start of their game against the Alaska Aces.
- November 9: (Manila Clasico) The team retired the jersey numbers of Rey Evangelista (#7) and Jerry Codiñera (#44) before their game against Barangay Ginebra San Miguel. They also wore a modified version of their 1989 jerseys.
- December 11:The Hotshots lost to the Meralco Bolts in the first phase of the quarterfinals having a twice-to-beat disadvantage, they hardly-fought in a cold-game but they struggled until the end game, losing the game with the score off 77–65. The loss ends the four-straight championship run of the Hotshots since the 2013 PBA Governors' Cup and it's also the first time that the Hotshots did not qualify to the semis since the 2013 PBA Commissioner's Cup.
- May 9:The franchise changed their name to Star Hotshots.

== Draft picks ==
Round	Pick	Player	Position	Nationality	PBA D-League team	College
no draft picks

== Roster ==
2014–15 Star Hotshots roster
Players
Coaches

Pos.	#	POB	Name	Height	Weight	DOB (YYYY–MM–DD)	From
C	00	(Kuwait)	Yousef Taha	6 ft 9 in (2.06 m)	226 lb (103 kg)	1988-07-08	North Lake
G	2	(Philippines)	Justin Melton	5 ft 11 in (1.80 m)	165 lb (75 kg)	1987-04-27	Mount Olive
C	4	(United States)	Rafi Reavis (C)	6 ft 9 in (2.06 m)	210 lb (95 kg)	1977-07-26	Coppin State
G	8	(Philippines)	Peter June Simon	6 ft 0 in (1.83 m)	180 lb (82 kg)	1980-06-01	Mindanao
G	9	(Philippines)	Lester Alvarez	5 ft 10 in (1.78 m)	154 lb (70 kg)	1988-09-18	Adamson
F/C	10	(Philippines)	Ian Sangalang (injured) (IN)	6 ft 8 in (2.03 m)	215 lb (98 kg)	1991-12-20	San Sebastian
G/F	11	(United States)	Alex Mallari	6 ft 4 in (1.93 m)	176 lb (80 kg)	1987-03-26	Lewis–Clark State
G	14	(Philippines)	Mark Barroca	5 ft 11 in (1.80 m)	170 lb (77 kg)	1986-04-25	Far Eastern
F	15	(Philippines)	Marc Pingris	6 ft 5 in (1.96 m)	215 lb (98 kg)	1981-10-16	Far Eastern
G/F	18	(Philippines)	James Yap	6 ft 3 in (1.91 m)	205 lb (93 kg)	1982-02-15	UE
F	19	(Philippines)	Jerwin Gaco	6 ft 5 in (1.96 m)	180 lb (82 kg)	1981-01-17	De La Salle
G/F	22	(Philippines)	Allein Maliksi	6 ft 4 in (1.93 m)	180 lb (82 kg)	1987-09-18	UST
F	38	(United States)	Joe Devance	6 ft 8 in (2.03 m)	220 lb (100 kg)	1982-02-19	UTEP
F/C	41	(Philippines)	Don Allado	6 ft 6 in (1.98 m)	225 lb (102 kg)	1977-06-10	De La Salle
C	88	(Australia)	Mick Pennisi	6 ft 10 in (2.08 m)	235 lb (107 kg)	1975-03-13	Eastern Michigan

Head coach

- (United States) Tim Cone (George Washington)

Assistant coach(es)

- (Philippines) Richard del Rosario (De La Salle)
- (Philippines) Johnny Abarrientos (Far Eastern)
- (Philippines) Jason Webb (De La Salle)
- (Philippines) Mon Jose (De La Salle)

Team manager

- (Philippines) Alvin Patrimonio (Mapúa)

Legend

- (C) Team captain
- (CI) Commissioner's Cup Import
- (GI) Governors' Cup Import
- (EI) EASL Import
- (DP) Unsigned draft pick
- (FA) Free agent
- (IN) Inactive
- (S) Suspended
- (R) Rookie
- Injured

== Philippine Cup ==
=== Eliminations ===
==== Standings ====
Pos	Team	W	L	PCT	GB	Qualification
1	San Miguel Beermen	9	2	.818 (Note: Head-to-head record: San Miguel 1–0 Rain or Shine)	—	Advance to semifinals
2	Rain or Shine Elasto Painters	9	2	.818	—	Advance to semifinals
3	Alaska Aces	8	3	.727 (Note: Head-to-head record: Alaska 1–0 Talk 'N Text)	1	Twice-to-beat in the quarterfinals
4	Talk 'N Text Tropang Texters	8	3	.727	1	Twice-to-beat in the quarterfinals
5	Barangay Ginebra San Miguel	6	5	.545 (Note: Head-to-head quotient: Barangay Ginebra 1.07, Meralco 1.06, Purefoods Star 0.89)	3	Twice-to-beat in the quarterfinals
6	Meralco Bolts	6	5	.545	3	Twice-to-beat in the quarterfinals
7	Purefoods Star Hotshots	6	5	.545	3	Twice-to-win in the quarterfinals
8	GlobalPort Batang Pier	5	6	.455	4	Twice-to-win in the quarterfinals
9	Barako Bull Energy	4	7	.364 (Note: Head-to-head record: Barako Bull 1–0 NLEX)	5	Twice-to-win in the quarterfinals
10	NLEX Road Warriors	4	7	.364	5	Twice-to-win in the quarterfinals
11	Kia Sorento	1	10	.091	8	
12	Blackwater Elite	0	11	.000	9	

Source: PBA.ph

=== Playoffs ===
==== Bracket ====
Quarterfinals (1st phase) (Higher seeds twice-to-beat)
3	Alaska	82
10	NLEX	78
6	Meralco	77
7	Purefoods Star	65
4	Talk 'N Text	105
9	Barako Bull	76
5	Barangay Ginebra	95
8	GlobalPort	78

Quarterfinals (2nd phase) (Single elimination)
3	Alaska	87
6	Meralco	69
4	Talk N Text	83
5	Barangay Ginebra	67

Semifinals (Best-of-7)
2	Rain or Shine	2
3	Alaska	4
1	San Miguel	4
4	Talk N' Text	0

Finals (Best-of-7)
3	Alaska	3
1	San Miguel	4

== Commissioner's Cup ==
=== Eliminations ===
==== Standings ====
Pos	Team	W	L	PCT	GB	Qualification
1	Rain or Shine Elasto Painters	8	3	.727 (Note: Head-to-head quotient: Rain or Shine 1.025, Talk 'N Text 1.010, Purefoods 0.969)	—	Twice-to-beat in the quarterfinals
2	Talk 'N Text Tropang Texters	8	3	.727	—	Twice-to-beat in the quarterfinals
3	Purefoods Star Hotshots	8	3	.727	—	Best-of-three quarterfinals
4	NLEX Road Warriors	6	5	.545 (Note: Head-to-head record: NLEX 1–0 Meralco)	2	Best-of-three quarterfinals
5	Meralco Bolts	6	5	.545	2	Best-of-three quarterfinals
6	Alaska Aces	5	6	.455 (Note: Head-to-head quotient: Alaska 1.021, Barako Bull 1.019, Barangay Ginebra 0.960)	3	Best-of-three quarterfinals
7	Barako Bull Energy	5	6	.455	3	Twice-to-win in the quarterfinals
8	Barangay Ginebra San Miguel	5	6	.455	3	Twice-to-win in the quarterfinals
9	San Miguel Beermen	4	7	.364 (Note: Head-to-head quotient: San Miguel 1.011, GlobalPort 0.995, Kia 0.994)	4	
10	GlobalPort Batang Pier	4	7	.364	4	
11	Kia Carnival	4	7	.364	4	
12	Blackwater Elite	3	8	.273	5	

Source: PBA.ph

=== Playoffs ===
==== Bracket ====
Quarterfinals
(#1 twice-to-beat)
1	Rain or Shine	92
8	Barangay Ginebra	91
(Best-of-3)
4	NLEX	0
5	Meralco	2
(#2 twice-to-beat)
2	Talk 'N Text	127
7	Barako Bull	97
(Best-of-3)
3	Purefoods Star	2
6	Alaska	0

Semifinals (Best-of-5)
1	Rain or Shine	3
5	Meralco	0
2	Talk 'N Text	3
3	Purefoods Star	1

Finals (Best-of-7)
1	Rain or Shine	3
2	Talk 'N Text	4

== Governors' Cup ==
=== Eliminations ===
==== Standings ====
Pos	Team	W	L	PCT	GB	Qualification
1	Alaska Aces	8	3	.727 (Note: Head-to-head record: Alaska 1–0 San Miguel)	—	Twice-to-beat in the quarterfinals
2	San Miguel Beermen	8	3	.727	—	Twice-to-beat in the quarterfinals
3	Rain or Shine Elasto Painters	7	4	.636 (Note: Head-to-head record: Rain or Shine 1–0 GlobalPort)	1	Twice-to-beat in the quarterfinals
4	GlobalPort Batang Pier	7	4	.636	1	Twice-to-beat in the quarterfinals
5	Star Hotshots	6	5	.545 (Note: Head-to-head record: Barako Bull 1–0 Star)	2	Twice-to-win in the quarterfinals
6	Barako Bull Energy	6	5	.545	2	Twice-to-win in the quarterfinals
7	Meralco Bolts	5	6	.455 (Note: Head-to-head quotient: Meralco 1.13, Barangay Ginebra 1.00, Kia 0.95, Talk 'N Text 0.93)	3	Twice-to-win in the quarterfinals
8	Barangay Ginebra San Miguel	5	6	.455	3	Twice-to-win in the quarterfinals
9	Kia Carnival	5	6	.455	3	
10	Talk 'N Text Tropang Texters	5	6	.455	3	
11	NLEX Road Warriors	3	8	.273	5	
12	Blackwater Elite	1	10	.091	7	

Source: PBA.ph

==== Bracket ====
Quarterfinals (Top 4 twice-to-beat)
1	Alaska	114
8	Ginebra	108
4	GlobalPort	73	94
5	Star	126	101
2	San Miguel	99	102
7	Meralco	106	86
3	Rain or Shine	134**
6	Barako Bull	132

Semifinals (Best-of-5)
1	Alaska	3
5	Star	0
2	San Miguel	3
3	Rain or Shine	1

Finals (Best-of-7)
1	Alaska	0
2	San Miguel	4

*Game went into double overtime

== Transactions ==
=== Overview ===
Players Added

Via free agency

- Don Allado

Via trade

- Mick Pennisi
Players Lost

Via Expansion Draft

- JR Cawaling

Via trade

- Isaac Holstein
- Ronnie Matias

=== Trades ===
==== Draft day ====
August 24, 2014	To GlobalPort 1st round pick (Anthony Semerad) and 2016 1st round pick (from San Mig)	To San Mig Super Coffee 2016 1st round pick and 2018 2nd round pick (from GlobalPort)

=== Philippine Cup ===
December 8, 2014	To Barako Bull Isaac Holstein; Ronnie Matias	To Purefoods Mick Pennisi

=== Recruited imports ===
Tournament	Name	Debuted	Last game	Record
Commissioner's Cup	Marqus Blakely	January 30 (vs GlobalPort)	February 6 (vs Blackwater)	3–0
Commissioner's Cup	Daniel Orton	February 11 (vs NLEX)	February 18 (vs Kia)	4–2
Commissioner's Cup	Denzel Bowles	February 22 (vs Barangay Ginebra)	April 11 (vs Talk 'N Text)	7–4
Governors' Cup	Marqus Blakely	May 9 (vs NLEX)	July 5 (vs Alaska)	9–8
