= Rashawn McCarthy =

Filipino-American basketball player

Free agent
- Position: Shooting guard

Personal information
- Born: September 10, 1989 (age 37) Westbury, New York
- Listed height: 6 ft 0 in (1.83 m)
- Listed weight: 175 lb (79 kg)

Career information
- High school: Westbury (Old Westbury, New York)
- College: SUNY–Old Westbury
- PBA draft: 2016: 2nd round, 6th overall pick
- Drafted by: San Miguel Beermen
- Playing career: 2013–present

Career history
- 2013–2014: Westports Malaysia Dragons
- 2016–2017: San Miguel Beermen
- 2017–2021: Kia Picanto / Columbian Dyip / Terrafirma Dyip
- 2021–2023: Blackwater Bossing
- 2024: Bacolod City of Smiles
- 2025: Cebu Classic

Career highlights
- 2× PBA champion (2017 Philippine, 2017 Commissioner's)

Rashawn Frisco McCarthy (born September 10, 1989) is a Filipino-American professional basketball player who last played for the Cebu Classic of the Maharlika Pilipinas Basketball League (MPBL).

== Professional career ==
McCarthy played two seasons with the Westports Malaysia Dragons in the ASEAN Basketball League (ABL).

McCarthy was drafted sixth overall by the San Miguel Beermen in the 2016 PBA draft.

On October 17, 2017, McCarthy, along with Ronald Tubid, Jay-R Reyes, and a 2019 first-round pick, to the Kia Picanto for the first overall pick of the 2017 PBA draft. The pick was used by San Miguel to draft Christian Standhardinger.

On September 28, 2021, he was traded to the Blackwater Bossing for Simon Enciso. On January 1, 2024, McCarthy became a free agent after his contract expired.

== PBA career statistics ==
Legend
GP	Games played	MPG	Minutes per game
FG%	Field-goal percentage	3P%	3-point field-goal percentage	FT%	Free-throw percentage
RPG	Rebounds per game	APG	Assists per game	SPG	Steals per game
BPG	Blocks per game	PPG	Points per game	**Bold**	Career high

As of the end of 2023–24 season

=== Season-by-season averages ===
Year	Team	GP	MPG	FG%	3P%	FT%	RPG	APG	SPG	BPG	PPG
2016–17	San Miguel	14	4.4	.348	.300	.700	.8	.4	.2	—	2.0
2017–18	Kia / Columbian	**33**	33.7	.395	**.381**	.691	**5.0**	4.6	**1.3**	.1	14.5
2019	Columbian	**33**	**35.6**	.374	.308	.728	**5.0**	**4.7**	1.2	**.2**	**14.7**
2020	Terrafirma	7	19.5	**.419**	.346	.500	2.3	3.0	.3	—	7.0
2021	Terrafirma	21	26.1	.354	.283	**.909**	2.7	2.3	.8	**.2**	10.6
2021	Blackwater	21	26.1	.354	.283	**.909**	2.7	2.3	.8	**.2**	10.6
2022–23	Blackwater	30	25.1	.326	.271	.795	3.1	3.6	.7	.1	7.2
2023–24	Blackwater	5	8.0	.273	.000	—	.4	.8	.2	—	1.2
Career		143	26.7	.370	.313	.736	3.6	3.4	.9	.1	10.4
