= Isaac Holstein =

Filipino-American basketball player

Personal information
- Born: September 7, 1987 (age 39) West Virginia, U.S.
- Listed height: 7 ft 0 in (2.13 m)
- Listed weight: 210 lb (95 kg)

Career information
- College: West Virginia State
- PBA draft: 2013: 1st round, 7th overall pick
- Drafted by: GlobalPort Batang Pier
- Playing career: 2013–2015
- Position: Center

Career history
- 2013–2014: San Mig Super Coffee Mixers / Purefoods Star Hotshots
- 2014–2015: Barako Bull Energy

Career highlights
- 3× PBA champion (2013–14 Philippine, 2014 Commissioner's, 2014 Governors')

Isaac Jackson Holstein V (born September 7, 1987) is a Filipino-American former professional basketball player. He last played for the Barako Bull Energy of the Philippine Basketball Association (PBA). He was drafted with the 7th overall pick by the GlobalPort Batang Pier in the 2013 PBA draft. Two days after the draft, he was traded to San Mig in exchange for fellow rookie Justin Chua and veteran Leo Najorda.

Holstein is a 6-foot 9 stretchman who specializes in putbacks and mid-range shooting. Holstein is a three-time Philippine Basketball Association and member of the 2013 San Mig Super Coffee Mixers roster who captured the rare Grand Slam.

His entry into the PBA signals the complete reversal of his basketball fortunes. A former NCAA Division II player, he quit basketball and decided to embark on a different path in life. Instead, he saw his hoops career resurrected after moving to Manila to play in the PBA D-League, first with Big Chill before moving to Blackwater.

After spending his rookie season with the grand slam champion Purefoods Star Hotshots, he was traded along with Ronnie Matias midway through the 2014–15 PBA Philippine Cup for Barako Bull Energy veteran center Mick Pennisi. After a couple of months, he was waived by the Energy.

He has since retired and is now a mortgage loan initiator initiator back in the United States.

== PBA career statistics ==
Legend
GP	Games played	MPG	Minutes per game
FG%	Field-goal percentage	3P%	3-point field-goal percentage	FT%	Free-throw percentage
RPG	Rebounds per game	APG	Assists per game	SPG	Steals per game
BPG	Blocks per game	PPG	Points per game	**Bold**	Career high

=== Season-by-season averages ===
Year	Team	GP	MPG	FG%	3P%	FT%	RPG	APG	SPG	BPG	PPG
2013–14	San Mig Super Coffee	**16**	**5.3**	.312	.000	.312	1.3	**.1**	**.1**	**.2**	.9
2014–15	Purefoods Star	5	5.0	**.444**	.000	**.500**	**1.4**	.0	.0	**.2**	**2.0**
2014–15	Barako Bull	5	5.0	**.444**	.000	**.500**	**1.4**	.0	.0	**.2**	**2.0**
Career		21	5.2	.360	.000	.350	1.3	.1	.1	.2	1.2
