= Flintstones (basketball) =

Three players for Michigan State in 2000

The Flintstones were a group of three basketball players from Flint, Michigan, who helped lead the Michigan State Spartans to the 2000 NCAA Division I Men's National Championship. Originally, there were four members of "The Flintstones", but Antonio Smith graduated in 1999.

The name of the Flintstones rose to prominence during the successful run of Michigan State basketball including three consecutive Final Fours and a national championship. The four made up the core nucleus of the team. The players also sported tattoos bearing the name Flint, along with a basketball on their upper arms.

The name has since expanded to become popular to be used to refer to other basketball players, other athletes, and Flint natives.

Mateen Cleaves, Morris Peterson, and Charlie Bell, three individuals who hail from Flint, Michigan, and have thus been given the nickname The Flintstones, played together since elementary school, and whose comradeship and loyalty to one another carried out onto the floor, and made the Spartans team a family off the floor as well.

— The Library of Congress, CONGRATULATING MICHIGAN STATE UNIVERSITY MEN'S BASKETBALL TEAM -- (Senate - April 05, 2000)

The original Michigan State University "Flintstones" were Morris Peterson, Mateen Cleaves, Charlie Bell, Anthony Mull, and Antonio Smith.
