= 2009 PBA draft =

Player selection in Philippine basketball

General information
- Date: August 2, 2009
- Time: 4:00 pm (PHT)
- Location: Market! Market! Fort Bonifacio, Taguig
- Network: Solar TV

Overview
- League: Philippine Basketball Association
- First selection: Japeth Aguilar, Burger King Whoppers

The 2009 Philippine Basketball Association (PBA) rookie draft was an event at which teams drafted players from the amateur ranks. The event was held at Market! Market! in Taguig on August 2, 2009. The Burger King Whoppers selected Japeth Aguilar of the Ateneo de Manila University and Western Kentucky University as the number one draft pick. Players applied for the draft had undergone a three-day rookie camp. This is the only draft wherein a draft pick held by a defunct franchise was not retained by a new team which purchased that franchise (the second overall pick originally held by Shell was not inherited by Rain or Shine).

== Japeth Aguilar controversy ==
As expected, the Burger King Whoppers nabbed Japeth Aguilar as its overall No.1 draft pick in the 2009 PBA draft; however days after the draft, he boldly declare that he would join the Smart Gilas Pilipinas developmental basketball program coached by Serbian Rajko Toroman, a move which caused controversy within the PBA and angst especially by the team that drafted him. Its governor, Lito Alvarez, even went to the extent of banning Aguilar from the league for his refusal to sign with the Whoppers.

An amicable settlement was reached on October 9, 2009, two days before the 35th PBA season. With SBP prexy Manny Pangilinan and executive director Noli Eala intervening and at Alvarez's behest, Aguilar signed the one-year contract with the Whoppers, which included him playing for a few games with them then he would be traded to Talk N Text Tropang Texters (Pangilinan's PBA team) which would then release him to Smart Gilas as he wanted. Alvarez even said that before Aguilar signed their contract, the former already has had the latter's No.18 uniform with the Whoppers made.

Aguilar played his only professional game with the Whoppers against the Purefoods Tender Juicy Giants in the PBA season opener, which ended in a 93–80 loss to the Giants. Immediately after, Aguilar got his wish as the Whoppers traded him to the Tropang Texters in exchange for future draft picks, indirectly through Barako Bull Energy Boosters which acted as the conduit team. As expected, TNT loaned him to Smart Gilas where he will stay there until after the 2012 London Olympics as per his Gilas contract.

As the consequence of this controversy, the board of governors approved stiffer penalties for rookie draftees who would turn their back on the league.

== Round 1 ==
PG	Point guard	SG	Shooting guard	SF	Small forward	PF	Power forward	C	Center	*	Mythical team member	^{#}	All-Star

Pick	Player	Country of origin*	PBA team	College
1	Japeth Aguilar^{*}	Philippines	Burger King Whoppers (from Barako Bull)	WKU
			none [the second overall draft pick was owned by the defunct Shell Turbo Chargers (from Coca-Cola)]	
2	Rico Maierhofer^{#}	Philippines	Purefoods TJ Giants	De La Salle
3	Chris Ross^{*}	United States	Burger King Whoppers	Marshall
4	Jervy Cruz	Philippines	Rain or Shine Elasto Painters	UST
5	Mike Burtscher	Switzerland	Alaska Aces	[]
6	Rogemar Menor	Philippines	Burger King Whoppers (from Barako Bull)	San Beda
7	Chris Timberlake	United States	Barangay Ginebra Kings (traded to Purefoods)	North Florida
8	Ronnie Matias	Philippines	Burger King Whoppers	UM
9	James Sena	Philippines	San Miguel Beermen	JRU

== Round 2 ==
Pick	Player	Country of origin*	PBA team	College
1	Mark Lester Benitez	Philippines	Sta. Lucia Realtors (from Coca-Cola)	De La Salle
2	Benedict Fernandez	Philippines	Barako Bull Energy Boosters	FEU
3	Edwin Asoro	Philippines	Barako Bull Energy Boosters (from Purefoods)	NU
4	Francis Allera	Philippines	Burger King Whoppers (traded to Coca-Cola)	UST
5	Marcy Arellano	Philippines	Rain or Shine Elasto Painters	UE
6	Sean Co	Philippines	Alaska Aces (from Rain or Shine)	Mapua
7	Charles Waters	United States	Sta. Lucia Realtors	
8	Orlando Daroya	Philippines	Barangay Ginebra Kings (traded to Burger King)	Arellano
9	Kevin White	United States	Talk 'N Text Tropang Texters	West Hills
10	PJ Walsham	Philippines	Burger King Whoppers (from San Miguel, traded to Coca-Cola)	De La Salle

== Undrafted players ==
- Josh Urbiztondo – signed with Sta. Lucia Realty
- Bryan Faundo from Letran – signed with Barako Bull Energy Boosters
- Marlon Adolfo from Far Eastern
- Charleston Bocias from Sta. Francis of Assisi
- Kim Macanig - Philippine Christian University
- Axel John Doruelo from UP Diliman – signed with Thailand Tigers in the ABL – signed with Petron Blaze Boosters
- Jim Bruce Viray from San Sebastian – signed by the Barako Bull Energy Boosters as free agent
- Luis Palaganas East
- Leemore Boliver from Arellano / Philippine Christian University
- Glenn Bolocon from Emilio Aguinaldo
- Roel Hugnatan from Adamson
- Richard Saladaga from San Jose - Recoletos
- Dino Daa from Letran – signed with Philippine Patriots in the ABL
- Jonathan Pinera from Letran
- Jorel Canizares from East
- Gerry Orera from Adamson
- Ramsey Williams from Hawaii – signed with Quezon Red Oilers in the Liga Pilipinas and picked up by Burger King as a free agent
- Jerome Cenita from San Sebastian - Cavite
- Jemal Vizcarra from Santo Tomas
- Roser Mangahas from Far Eastern University
- Jerby Del Rosario from Mapua
- Floyd Dedicatoria from JRU
- Jan Philip Villaver from San Sebastian - Cavite
- Chris Viardo from Pilgrim High School
- Howard Saddi from Centro Escolar University
- Hafer Mondragon from Letran – signed with Philippine Patriots in the ABL
- Raymond Aguilar from National
- Cris Angelo Espinosa from JRU
- Allan Evangelista from Santo Tomas
- Andro Quinday from Letran
- Emmanuel Malasig from Berkeley (US)
- Jobe Nkemakolam from Ateneo
- Jonathan Uyloan – signed by Rain or Shine Elasto Painters as a free agent
- Jonathan Parreno from WMSU

== Note ==
*All aspirants are Filipinos until proven otherwise.
