= Jay-R Reyes =

Filipino basketball player

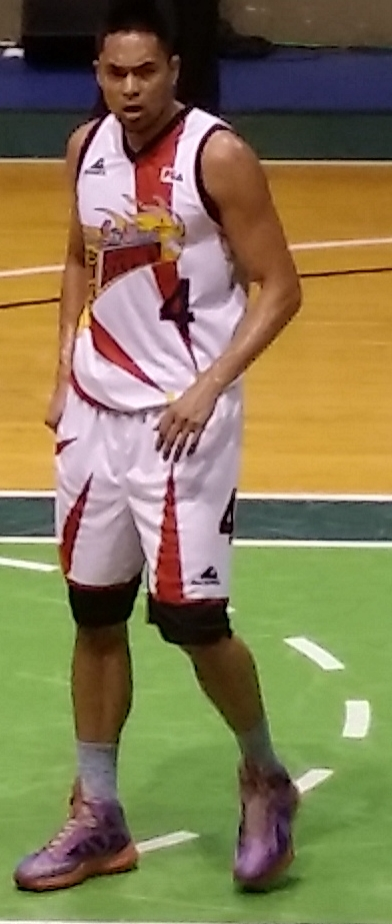
- Reyes in 2015

Personal information
- Born: July 16, 1984 (age 42) Tiwi, Albay, Philippines
- Listed height: 6 ft 7 in (2.01 m)
- Listed weight: 215 lb (98 kg)

Career information
- High school: Letran (Manila)
- College: UP
- PBA draft: 2006: Elevated
- Drafted by: Welcoat Dragons
- Playing career: 2006–2020
- Position: Power forward / center

Career history
- 2006–2011: Rain or Shine Elasto Painters
- 2011: Air21 Express
- 2011–2012: Alaska Aces
- 2012–2013: Meralco Bolts
- 2013–2015: Barangay Ginebra San Miguel
- 2015–2017: San Miguel Beermen
- 2017–2019: Kia Picanto / Columbian Dyip
- 2020: Phoenix Super LPG Fuel Masters

Career highlights
- 4× PBA champion (2015 Governors', 2015–16 Philippine, 2016–17 Philippine, 2017 Commissioner's); PBA All-Star (2009); PBA Mythical Second Team (2009); PBA All-Rookie Team (2007)

Jay-R C. Reyes (born July 16, 1984) is a Filipino former professional basketball player. He played for eight teams during his career in the Philippine Basketball Association (PBA).

== Professional career ==
Reyes was the youngest player in the 2006–07 PBA season at only 22 years of age. He played 35 games and he averaged 12.51 points per game, 1.57 blocks per game and 8.89 rebounds per game. He was one of the rookies who led the PBA in the top ten in the rebound category.

On January 20, Rain or Shine Elasto Painters, Meralco Bolts and Air21 Express were involved in a tree way trade. Rain or Shine was able to get Ronjay Buenafe, Ronnie Matias, the 2011 and 2013 1st-round picks from Air21 and Beau Belga from Meralco. Meralco will now have Solomon Mercado and Paolo Bugia from Rain or Shine and Erick Rodriguez of Air21. Air21 will now have Jay-R Reyes from Rain or Shine, Reed Juntilla from Meralco and the 2011 and 2013 second round pics from Meralco.

After playing one conference with the Air21 Express, Jay-R Reyes has been traded for Alaska Aces' top scorer Joe Devance. It was reported that Joe Devance wanted out of Alaska, hoping to get better compensation somewhere else. The Alaska manager already offer JDV a 350,000 php a month.

He was traded to Meralco Bolts for Gabby Espinas and also allows the Aces to swap first-round draft picks in the 2012 PBA draft .

After Meralco's elimination in the Governor's Cup Semifinals series against San Mig Coffee Mixers, he was traded to Barangay Ginebra San Miguel for Kerby Raymundo .

He was traded to San Miguel Beermen in a three team trade involving Barangay Ginebra San Miguel and Barako Bull Energy who Barangay Ginebra send big man Jay-R Reyes to the Barako Bull Energy in exchange for big man Dorian Peña and Barako's 2015 2nd-round pick and then Jay-R Reyes traded by the Barako Bull Energy in exchange for Justin Chua and SMB's 2017 1st-round pick, Later on August 31, 2015.

On October 17, 2017, Reyes, along with Rashawn McCarthy, Ronald Tubid, and a 2019 first-round pick, to the Kia Picanto for the first overall pick of the 2017 PBA draft. The pick was used by San Miguel to draft Christian Standhardinger.

On February 6, 2020, he signed with the Phoenix Super LPG Fuel Masters.

On May 15, 2021, Reyes retired from professional basketball.

== PBA career statistics ==
Legend
GP	Games played	MPG	Minutes per game
FG%	Field-goal percentage	3P%	3-point field-goal percentage	FT%	Free-throw percentage
RPG	Rebounds per game	APG	Assists per game	SPG	Steals per game
BPG	Blocks per game	PPG	Points per game	**Bold**	Career high

=== Season-by-season averages ===
Year	Team	GP	MPG	FG%	3P%	FT%	RPG	APG	SPG	BPG	PPG
2006–07	Welcoat	35	**34.5**	.405	.000	.576	**8.9**	1.1	**.5**	**1.6**	**12.5**
2007–08	Welcoat	31	30.1	.430	.182	**.695**	6.5	**1.6**	.4	1.0	12.4
2008–09	Rain or Shine	44	29.2	.450	**.406**	.598	8.0	1.0	**.5**	.7	12.2
2009–10	Rain or Shine	**50**	25.4	.359	.218	.522	6.8	.9	.4	.5	7.7
2010–11	Rain or Shine	42	22.6	.411	.265	.555	6.2	.9	**.5**	.8	7.4
2011–12	Rain or Shine	40	19.5	.404	.000	.548	6.1	.6	.3	.5	5.6
2011–12	Air21	40	19.5	.404	.000	.548	6.1	.6	.3	.5	5.6
2011–12	Alaska	40	19.5	.404	.000	.548	6.1	.6	.3	.5	5.6
2012–13	Alaska	46	17.4	**.486**	.167	.509	5.3	.4	.2	.3	4.4
2012–13	Meralco	46	17.4	**.486**	.167	.509	5.3	.4	.2	.3	4.4
2013–14	Barangay Ginebra	38	14.9	.453	.333	.463	5.4	.7	**.5**	.2	4.0
2014–15	Barangay Ginebra	29	8.4	.429	.000	.579	2.5	.1	.1	.3	2.0
2014–15	San Miguel	29	8.4	.429	.000	.579	2.5	.1	.1	.3	2.0
2015–16	San Miguel	39	7.5	.397	.385	.533	2.0	.2	.1	.2	2.1
2016–17	San Miguel	21	6.7	.391	.316	.563	2.1	.1	.1	.2	2.4
2017–18	Kia / Columbian	15	21.2	.413	.269	.680	4.9	.7	**.5**	.7	6.7
2019	Columbian	21	13.0	.354	.295	.333	3.0	.9	.4	.3	3.6
2020	Phoenix Super LPG	8	9.1	.333	.364	.000	1.3	.6	**.5**	.3	1.5
Career		459	19.9	.415	.279	.569	5.4	.7	.4	.6	6.6
