= 2017 PBA draft =

Player selection in Philippine basketball

General information
- Date: October 29, 2017
- Location: Robinsons Place Manila
- Networks: ESPN5 (TV5, PBA Rush, Sports5.ph)

Overview
- League: Philippine Basketball Association
- First selection: Christian Standhardinger (San Miguel Beermen)

The 2017 Philippine Basketball Association (PBA) rookie draft was an event that allowed teams to draft players from the amateur ranks. It was held at the Midtown Atrium, Robinsons Place Manila on October 29, 2017. The league determined the drafting order based on the performance of the member teams from the 2016–17 season, with the worst team picking first. The San Miguel Beermen selected first overall after a trade with the Kia Picanto.

== Draft order ==
The draft order is determined based from the overall performance of the teams from the previous season. The Philippine Cup final ranking comprises 40% of the points, while the rankings of the Commissioner's and Governors' Cups are 30% each.

Draft order	Team	Final ranking			Total
Draft order	Team	PHL	COM	GOV	Total
1st	Kia Picanto	10th	10th	12th	10.6
2nd	NLEX Road Warriors	12th	12th	5th	9.9
3rd	Blackwater Elite	9th	11th	8th	9.3
4th	Phoenix Fuel Masters	7th	7th	11th	8.2
5th	GlobalPort Batang Pier	6th	8th	10th	7.8
6th	Alaska Aces	5th	9th	9th	7.4
7th	Rain or Shine Elasto Painters	8th	6th	7th	7.1
8th	Meralco Bolts	11th	5th	2nd	6.5
9th	Star Hotshots	3rd	4th	4th	3.6
10th	TNT KaTropa	4th	2nd	3rd	3.1
11th	San Miguel Beermen	1st	1st	6th	2.5
12th	Barangay Ginebra San Miguel	2nd	3rd	1st	2.0

== Controversy involving Kia's first round pick ==
On October 27, 2017, PBA Commissioner Chito Narvasa approved the trade that sent Kia Picanto's first-round pick (first overall), which is used to draft Christian Standhardinger, in exchange for Ronald Tubid, Jay-R Reyes, Rashawn McCarthy and San Miguel's 2019 first-round draft choice, with minimal revisions from the original trade proposal that originally involved Keith Agovida, Reyes, McCarthy and a San Miguel draft pick. The trade proposal already earned the ire of fans as well as Wilfred Steven Uytengsu, team owner of the Alaska Aces, and Dioceldo Sy, team owner of the Blackwater Elite, since Kia traded its opportunity to pick a potential starter in exchange for role players.

In defense of approving the controversial Kia-San Miguel trade, Narvasa cited that TNT KaTropa also tried to make a deal with Kia's first-round pick. Narvasa also stated that TNT's manager Magnum Membrere submitted draft application papers on behalf of Standhardinger, even if Standhardinger already submitted his own papers three weeks before the September 4 draft application deadline for Filipino-descended foreign applicants.

TNT management then released a statement hours after the 2017 draft concluded, blasting Narvasa for being biased and questioned his credibility as the league's commissioner. TNT also clarified that the actions done by Magnum Membrere when submitting Standhardinger's draft application papers were done as a Philippine national basketball team representative.

== Draft ==
PG	Point guard	SG	Shooting guard	SF	Small forward	PF	Power forward	C	Center	*	Mythical team member	^{#}	All-Star

=== 1st round ===
Round	Pick	Player	Pos.	Country of birth*	Team	PBA D-League team(s)	School
1	1	Christian Standhardinger^{*}	C/PF	Germany	San Miguel Beermen (from Kia) (Note: October 27, 2017: Kia to San Miguel: San Miguel acquired a first round pick; Kia acquired Rashawn McCarthy, Ronald Tubid, Jay-R Reyes, and a 2019 first round pick)	none	Hawaii
1	2	Kiefer Ravena^{#}	PG/SG	Philippines	NLEX Road Warriors	none	Ateneo
1	3	Raymar Jose	PF	Philippines	Blackwater Elite	Cignal HD Hawkeyes	FEU
1	4	Jason Perkins^{*}	PF	United States	Phoenix Fuel Masters	Caida Tile Masters	De La Salle
1	5	Jeron Teng	SF/SG	Philippines	Alaska Aces (from GlobalPort) (Note: March 14, 2015: GlobalPort to Alaska: Alaska acquired Nonoy Baclao and a first round pick; GlobalPort acquired Gabby Espinas and a first round pick)	Flying V Thunder	De La Salle
1	6	Robbie Herndon	SG/SF	United States	GlobalPort Batang Pier (from Alaska) (Note: March 14, 2015: Alaska to GlobalPort: GlobalPort acquired Gabby Espinas and a first round pick; Alaska acquired Nonoy Baclao and a first round pick)	Marinerong Pilipino Skippers	San Francisco State
1	7	Rey Nambatac^{#}	SG/PG	Philippines	Rain or Shine Elasto Painters	Racal Tile Masters	Letran
1	8	Sidney Onwubere	PF	Philippines	Phoenix Fuel Masters (from Meralco) (Note: September 11, 2017: Meralco to Phoenix: Phoenix acquired Justin Chua and a first round pick; Meralco acquired Ranidel de Ocampo)	Racal Tile Masters	EAC
1	9	Lervin Flores	C	Philippines	Star Hotshots	Racal Tile Masters	Arellano
1	10	Mark Tallo	PG/SG	Philippines	TNT KaTropa (previously from GlobalPort via TNT) (Note: May 6, 2017: GlobalPort to TNT: TNT re-acquired a first round pick and acquired Anthony Semerad; GlobalPort acquired Larry Fonacier; September 22, 2014: TNT (Talk 'n Text) to GlobalPort (three-team trade with NLEX): GlobalPort acquired a first round pick from Talk 'n Text; Talk 'n Text acquired Jay Washington from GlobalPort and Matt Ganuelas from NLEX via GlobalPort; NLEX acquired Harold Arboleda, Ginebra's 2016 second round pick, and Talk 'n Text's 2018 second round pick from GlobalPort)	Racal Tile Masters	SWU
1	11	Jonjon Gabriel	C	Philippines	TNT KaTropa (from San Miguel via Phoenix) (Note: September 11, 2017: Phoenix to TNT: TNT acquired Norbert Torres and a first round pick; Phoenix acquired Ranidel de Ocampo; February 3, 2015: San Miguel to Barako Bull (three-team trade with Barangay Ginebra): Barako Bull acquired the pick and Justin Chua from San Miguel; San Miguel acquired Jay-R Reyes from Ginebra via Barako Bull; Ginebra acquired Dorian Peña and a 2015 second round pick from Barako Bull)	Marinerong Pilipino Skippers	Colegio de San Lorenzo
1	12	Jett Manuel	SG	Philippines	Barangay Ginebra San Miguel	Wang's Basketball Couriers	UP

=== 2nd round ===
Round	Pick	Player	Pos.	Country of birth*	Team	PBA D-League team(s)	School
2	13	John Grospe	PF	Philippines	NLEX Road Warriors (from Kia via Meralco) (Note: May 6, 2017: GlobalPort to NLEX (three-team trade with Meralco): NLEX acquired Larry Fonacier, Kia's second round pick, and a 2019 second round pick from GlobalPort; GlobalPort acquired Sean Anthony and Bradwyn Guinto from NLEX and Jonathan Grey from Meralco; Meralco acquired Garvo Lanete from NLEX via GlobalPort; October 7, 2015: Mahindra (Kia) to Meralco (three-team trade with NLEX): Meralco acquired the pick and a 2016 second round pick from Mahindra; Mahindra acquired a second round pick, a 2016 second round pick, and Juneric Baloria from NLEX; NLEX acquired Anthony from Meralco via Mahindra)	Team Batangas; JRU Heavy Bombers	JRU
2	14	Joseph Gabayni	C	Philippines	Star Hotshots (from NLEX via Kia) (Note: November 3, 2016: Mahindra (Kia) to Star (three-team trade with San Miguel): Star acquired Aldrech Ramos and a second round pick from Mahindra; Mahindra acquired Alex Mallari from Star and Ryan Araña from San Miguel; San Miguel acquired Keith Agovida from Mahindra and RR Garcia from Star via Mahindra; October 7, 2015: NLEX to Mahindra (three-team trade with Meralco): Mahindra acquired the pick, a 2016 second round pick, and Juneric Baloria from NLEX; NLEX acquired Anthony from Meralco via Mahindra; Meralco acquired a second round pick and a 2016 second round pick from Mahindra)	Racal Tile Masters; Team Batangas	Lyceum
2	15	Emil Palma	SG/SF	Philippines	Blackwater Elite (previously from NLEX via Blackwater) (Note: March 28, 2017: NLEX to Blackwater (three-team trade with Meralco): Blackwater re-acquired a second round pick from NLEX; NLEX acquired Rabeh Al-Hussaini from Meralco via Blackwater; Meralco acquired a 2018 second round pick from Blackwater; September 12, 2014: Blackwater to NLEX (three-team trade with Meralco): NLEX acquired the pick, a 2016 second round pick, and Juneric Baloria from Blackwater; Blackwater acquired Sunday Salvacion and Jason Ballesteros from Meralco; Meralco acquired Sean Anthony from NLEX via Blackwater)	Tanduay Light Rhum Masters	UE
2	16	Julian Sargent	SG/SF	United States	Star Hotshots (from Phoenix) (Note: September 19, 2015: Barako Bull to Star: Star acquired a second round pick; Barako Bull (Phoenix) acquired Mick Pennisi)	AMA Titans; Marinerong Pilipino Skippers	De La Salle
2	17	Louie Vigil	SG/SF	Philippines	San Miguel Beermen (from GlobalPort) (Note: June 10, 2013: GlobalPort to Petron (San Miguel) (three-team trade with Ginebra): Petron acquired a second round pick and Jason Deutchman from GlobalPort; GlobalPort acquired Jay Washington from Petron; Ginebra acquired Japeth Aguilar from GlobalPort)	Blackwater Sports; Tanduay Light Rhum Masters; Bread Story Smashing Bakers	UST
2	18	Davon Potts	SG	United States	Alaska Aces	Cignal HD Hawkeyes	San Beda
2	19	Jomari Sollano	PF/C	Philippines	Rain or Shine Elasto Painters	Tanduay Light Rhum Masters	Letran
2	20	Gwyne Capacio	SF	Philippines	Star Hotshots (from Meralco via GlobalPort) (Note: November 11. 2013: GlobalPort to San Mig Coffee (Star): San Mig Coffee acquired a second round pick; GlobalPort acquired Jewel Ponferada; October 11, 2013: Meralco to GlobalPort: GlobalPort acquired Chris Ross, Chris Timberlake, the pick, and a 2016 second round pick; Meralco acquired Gary David and A. J. Mandani)	Racal Tile Masters; Wang's Couriers	Ateneo
2	21	Jayson Grimaldo	PF	Philippines	Phoenix Fuel Masters (from Star) (Note: August 12, 2013: San Mig Coffee (Star) to Barako Bull (Phoenix): Barako Bull acquired a second round pick, Wesley Gonzales, and Chris Pacana; San Mig Coffee acquired Allein Maliksi)	Victoria Sports Stallions; Racal Tile Masters	MLQU
2	22	Monbert Arong	PG/SG	Philippines	TNT KaTropa	Cignal HD Hawkeyes	FEU
2	23	Wilson Baltazar	SF	Philippines	Phoenix Fuel Masters (from San Miguel) (Note: February 18, 2014: San Miguel to Barako Bull (Phoenix) (four-team trade with GlobalPort and Air21 [NLEX]): Barako Bull acquired Leo Najorda from GlobalPort, 2016 and 2017 second round picks, and Jason Deutchman from San Miguel; San Miguel acquired Rico Maierhofer from Barako Bull and Sol Mercado from GlobalPort; GlobalPort acquired Alex Cabagnot from San Miguel and Bonbon Custodio from Air21; Air21 acquired Jonas Villanueva from Barako Bull via GlobalPort)	Bread Story Smashing Bakers	Lyceum
2	24	Andreas Cahilig	SF/PF	Sweden	GlobalPort Batang Pier (from Barangay Ginebra) (Note: November 3, 2013: Ginebra to GlobalPort: GlobalPort acquired 2016 and 2017 second round picks and the draft rights to third round pick LA Revilla; Ginebra acquired a 2014 first round pick)	Cignal HD Hawkeyes	Earist

=== 3rd round ===
Round	Pick	Player	Pos.	Country of birth*	Team	PBA D-League team(s)	School
3	25	Chris de Chavez	SF	Philippines	Kia Picanto	Wang's Basketball Couriers	Ateneo
3	26	Gabriel Dagangon	SF	Philippines	NLEX Road Warriors	AMA Online Education Titans; Racal Tile Masters	Perpetual
3	27	Ebrahim Lopez	SG/SF	Philippines	Blackwater Elite	Marinerong Pilipino Skippers	UE
3	28	Roldan Sara	PG	Philippines	Phoenix Fuel Masters	Team Batangas; Racal Tile Masters	San Beda
3	29	Zachary Nicholls	SF	Canada	GlobalPort Batang Pier	Victoria Sports Stallions	Arellano
3	-	PASS			Alaska Aces		
3	30	Michael Juico	SG/PG	Philippines	Rain or Shine Elasto Painters	Wang's Couriers	San Sebastian
3	31	Jebb Bulawan	PF	Philippines	Meralco Bolts	Racal Tile Masters; Team Batangas	Lyceum
3	32	Thomas Torres	PG	Philippines	Star Hotshots	Racal Motors; Flying V Thunder	De La Salle
3	33	Dave Moralde	SG	Philippines	TNT KaTropa	Marinerong Pilipino Skippers; JAM Liner	UP
3	34	Jerome Ortega	PG	Philippines	San Miguel Beermen	AMA Titans	AMA
3	35	Elmer Mykiel Cabahug	SG	Philippines	Barangay Ginebra San Miguel	Wang's Couriers; Flying V Thunder	Ateneo

=== 4th round ===
Round	Pick	Player	Pos.	Country of birth*	Team	PBA D-League team(s)	School
4	36	Arvie Bringas	C	Philippines	Kia Picanto	Hapee Fresh Fighters; Big Chill Super Chargers	FEU
4	37	Felix Apreku	PF	Israel	NLEX Road Warriors	MP Hotel Warriors; Racal Tile Masters	Letran
4	38	Kyle Neypes	PF	Philippines	Blackwater Elite	BDO–NU; JAM Liner; Racal Tile Masters	NU
4	39	John Karlo Casiño	PG	Philippines	Phoenix Fuel Masters	Café France Bakers; CEU Scorpions	CEU
4	40	Gian Abrigo	SF	Philippines	GlobalPort Batang Pier	Tanduay Light Rhum Masters; Racal Tile Masters	Adamson
4	-	PASS			Rain or Shine Elasto Painters		
4	-	PASS			Meralco Bolts		
4	-	PASS			Star Hotshots		
4	-	PASS			TNT KaTropa		
4	41	Joseph Nalos	PG	Philippines	San Miguel Beermen	Z.C. Aguilas; Zark's Jawbreakers	Adamson
4	-	PASS			Barangay Ginebra San Miguel		

=== 5th round ===
Round	Pick	Player	Pos.	Country of birth*	Team	PBA D-League team(s)	School
5	42	Christian Geronimo	SG	Philippines	Kia Picanto	none	PUP
5	-	PASS			NLEX Road Warriors		
5	43	Jhon Sumido	SF/SG	Philippines	Blackwater Elite	Cobra Iron Men; Cebuana Lhuillier Gems; MP Hotel Warriors	UE
5	-	PASS			Phoenix Fuel Masters		
5	-	PASS			GlobalPort Batang Pier		
5	-	PASS			San Miguel Beermen		

== Trades involving draft picks ==
=== Pre-draft trades ===
Note: The rights to Barako Bull's draft picks were retained by Phoenix.

== Undrafted player ==
Name	Country of birth	College	Notes
Jeremiah dela Peña	Philippines	San Beda	

== Draft picks per school ==
School	1st round	After 1st round	Total
De La Salle	2	2	4
Ateneo	2	1	3
FEU	1	2	3
Letran	1	2	3
Lyceum	0	3	3
UE	0	3	3
Adamson	0	2	2
Arellano	0	2	2
San Beda	0	2	2
Other schools			1 each
