= Justin Melton =

Filipino-American basketball player

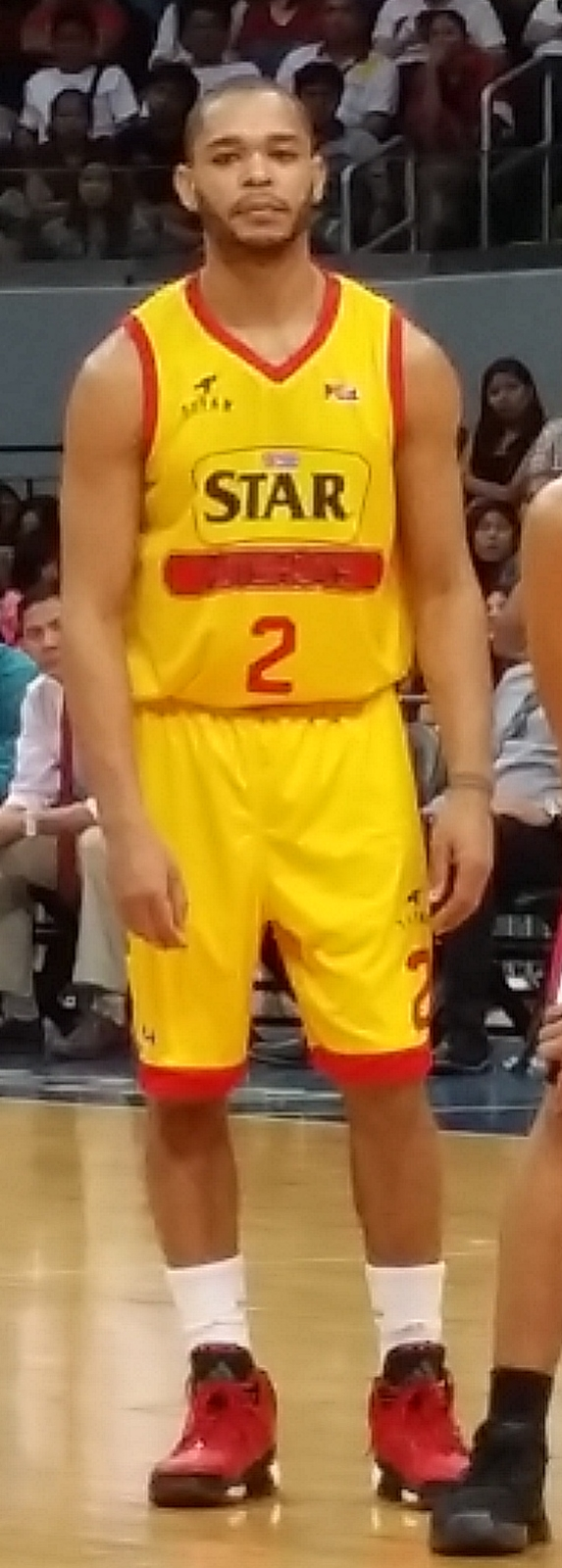
- Melton with the Star Hotshots in 2015

Personal information
- Born: April 7, 1987 (age 39) Angeles City, Philippines
- Listed height: 5 ft 9 in (1.75 m)
- Listed weight: 165 lb (75 kg)

Career information
- High school: Tabb (Yorktown, Virginia)
- College: Mount Olive (2005–2009)
- PBA draft: 2013: 2nd round, 13th overall pick
- Drafted by: San Mig Coffee Mixers
- Playing career: 2010–2023
- Position: Point guard

Career history
- 2010: AABI CLineSP Artur Nogueira
- 2012: Westports Malaysia Dragons
- 2013–2021: Magnolia Hotshots
- 2021: Terrafirma Dyip
- 2022: Blackwater Bossing
- 2024: Mindoro Tamaraws

Career highlights
- 4× PBA champion (2013–14 Philippine, 2014 Commissioner's, 2014 Governors', 2018 Governors'); PBA All-Rookie Team (2014); 2014 PBA All-Star Weekend Slamdunk Competition Co-champion

Justin Brian Melton (born April 7, 1987), popularly known as QuickMelt, Mouse, The Flying Minion, and Minion, is a Filipino-American former professional basketball player. He was drafted 13th overall by the San Mig Coffee Mixers in the 2013 PBA draft.

== Early career ==
Justin Melton played high school basketball at Tabb High School in Yorktown, Virginia. After playing one year of junior varsity basketball, Melton played three years of varsity basketball, capturing Bay Rivers District 1st Team Honors in his junior and senior seasons. In his senior season, he was awarded Bay Rivers District "Player of the Year," along with 1st Team All-Region and All-State honors. Melton also excelled in track and field, placing 2nd in the Virginia High School AA State Track Meet in the triple jump event with a distance of 45 feet 6 inches.

Melton studied and played basketball on a full scholarship at Mount Olive College, in Mount Olive, North Carolina. Justin was a very tough player in college and was the leader and motor of the team for the last 3 seasons. He shot over 40 percent from the 3-point line in his senior year. Melton possessed above-average athleticism for a person of his size and was very quick. He is also featured on his college's official website because of being featured on a Yahoo! Sports article.

He played more than 20 minutes a game in his college years.

== Professional career ==
=== Artur Nogueira – SP (Clinesp Artur Nogueira) ===
He played in Brazil for the AABI CLineSP Artur Nogueira, made great games being fundamental for the conquest of the Paulista championship, but the team went bankrupt and he was waived.

=== ABL ===
He played for Malaysia in the ASEAN Basketball League, as an import.

=== PBA ===
Melton was picked 13th overall by the Mixers in the 2013 PBA draft. Melton was noticed as one of the most athletic players in his draft class, and he showcased that athleticism very fast with his teammates. Though measured at just 5-foot-9 in socks, Melton finished with several rim-rattling slams during practice. His energy was also on display on defense. Melton struggled in his first conference, the 2013–14 PBA Philippine Cup, due to injuries on the finger, but bounced back and even won the Best Player of the Game honors.

He shocked the whole PBA, by winning the 2014 PBA All-Star Weekend Slam Dunk Contest held in the Mall of Asia Arena. He and Rey Guevarra had a head-to-head matchup on that battle, they have been tied for three rounds on the championship round, at last, they have been declared co-champions, because the process is going on and on.

He has a high vertical leap, which allows him to jump very high despite his 5'9" height. Melton is also a decent outside shooter, who shot at 67% in his first season.

On November 25, 2021, Melton, along with Kyle Pascual, was traded to the Terrafirma Dyip for James Laput.

On December 24, 2021, after only playing three games for the Dyip, Melton was traded to the Blackwater Bossing for Ed Daquioag. Melton became an unrestricted free agent on February 1, 2023. Shortly after, he retired from professional basketball.

== PBA career statistics ==
Legend
GP	Games played	MPG	Minutes per game
FG%	Field-goal percentage	3P%	3-point field-goal percentage	FT%	Free-throw percentage
RPG	Rebounds per game	APG	Assists per game	SPG	Steals per game
BPG	Blocks per game	PPG	Points per game	**Bold**	Career high

=== Season-by-season averages ===
Year	Team	GP	MPG	FG%	3P%	FT%	RPG	APG	SPG	BPG	PPG
2013–14	San Mig Super Coffee	**59**	14.9	.384	.306	**.820**	2.1	1.3	.8	**.2**	4.1
2014–15	Purefoods / Star	41	15.6	**.396**	.308	.650	2.9	1.5	.7	**.2**	4.4
2015–16	Star	33	**21.2**	.319	.263	.730	2.8	**2.4**	1.0	.1	**5.7**
2016–17	Star	49	**21.2**	.370	**.371**	.750	2.5	1.9	.9	**.2**	5.1
2017–18	Magnolia	44	20.6	.376	.352	.667	**3.5**	2.2	**1.2**	.1	5.5
2019	Magnolia	52	20.6	.288	.277	.625	3.0	1.6	1.0	.0	3.8
2020	Magnolia	12	15.3	.367	.360	.000	1.3	.8	1.0	.0	2.6
2021	Magnolia	20	11.0	.233	.212	—	1.3	1.0	.7	.0	1.4
2021	Terrafirma	20	11.0	.233	.212	—	1.3	1.0	.7	.0	1.4
2021	Blackwater	20	11.0	.233	.212	—	1.3	1.0	.7	.0	1.4
2022–23	Blackwater	18	16.4	.278	.242	—	2.3	1.8	1.1	.0	2.1
Career		328	18.1	.347	.310	.713	2.6	1.7	.9	.1	4.2

== Personal life ==
Melton is the son of Donnie Melton, an American, and Cecilia Fortes, a Filipino. After retirement, he moved to İzmir, Turkey.
