= Justin Chua =

Filipino basketball player

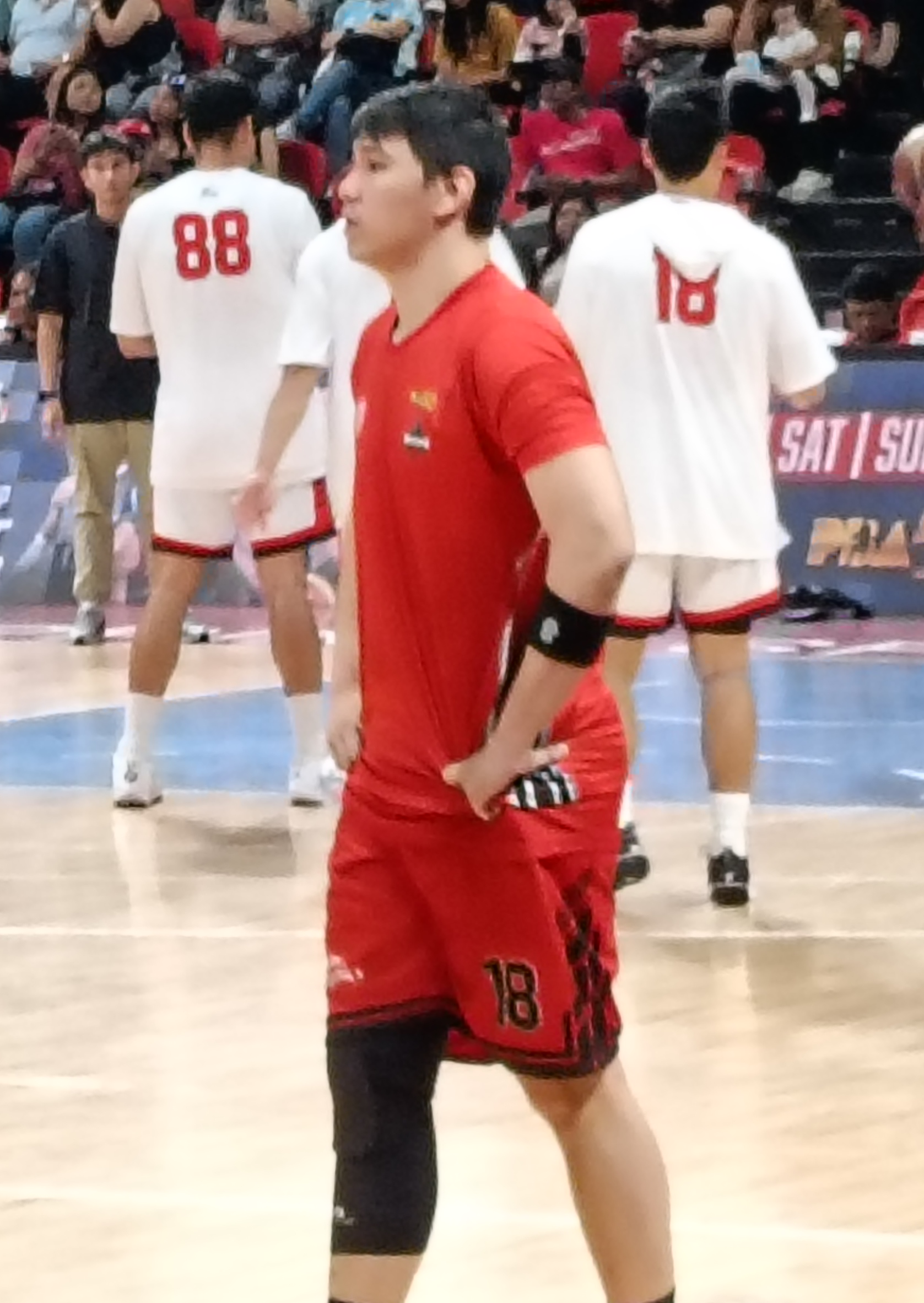
- Chua in 2025

No. 9 – Phoenix Super LPG Fuel Masters
- Position: Center
- League: PBA

Personal information
- Born: July 13, 1989 (age 37) Manila, Philippines
- Listed height: 6 ft 6 in (1.98 m)
- Listed weight: 245 lb (111 kg)

Career information
- High school: Chiang Kai Shek College (Manila)
- College: Ateneo (2008–2012)
- PBA draft: 2013: 1st round, 10th overall pick
- Drafted by: San Mig Super Coffee Mixers
- Playing career: 2013–present

Career history
- 2013–2014: GlobalPort Batang Pier
- 2014–2015: San Miguel Beermen
- 2015: Barako Bull Energy
- 2015–2017: Meralco Bolts
- 2017: TNT KaTropa
- 2017–2022: Phoenix Super LPG Fuel Masters
- 2022: NLEX Road Warriors
- 2023: TNT Tropang Giga
- 2024–2025: Blackwater Bossing
- 2026: TNT Tropang 5G
- 2026–present: Phoenix Super LPG Fuel Masters

Career highlights
- 2× PBA champion (2014–15 Philippine, 2023 Governors'); PBA Defensive Player of the Year (2020); PBA All-Defensive Team (2020); 5× UAAP champion (2008–2012)

Justin Shaun Rodriguez Chua (born July 13, 1989) is a Filipino professional basketball player for the Phoenix Super LPG Fuel Masters of the Philippine Basketball Association (PBA). He was the former star player of Chiang Kai Shek College during his high school days. He played for the Ateneo de Manila University before being selected tenth overall in the 2013 PBA draft by San Mig Super Coffee Mixers.

== Early life ==
Chua was born in Manila but grew up in Bacolod City. He first played basketball in Trinity Christian School in Bacolod. He then moved back to Manila when he played for the Chiang Kai Shek Dragons in the Tiong Lian Basketball Association (now defunct). At the time, he played more inside and took less jump shots. He had 15 points, 17 rebounds, and 10 blocks in one game. In 2007, his team won a championship over the Xavier School Stallions, and he won MVP. In 2008, he led Chiang Kai Shek back to the finals, but this time they lost to Xavier.

== College career ==
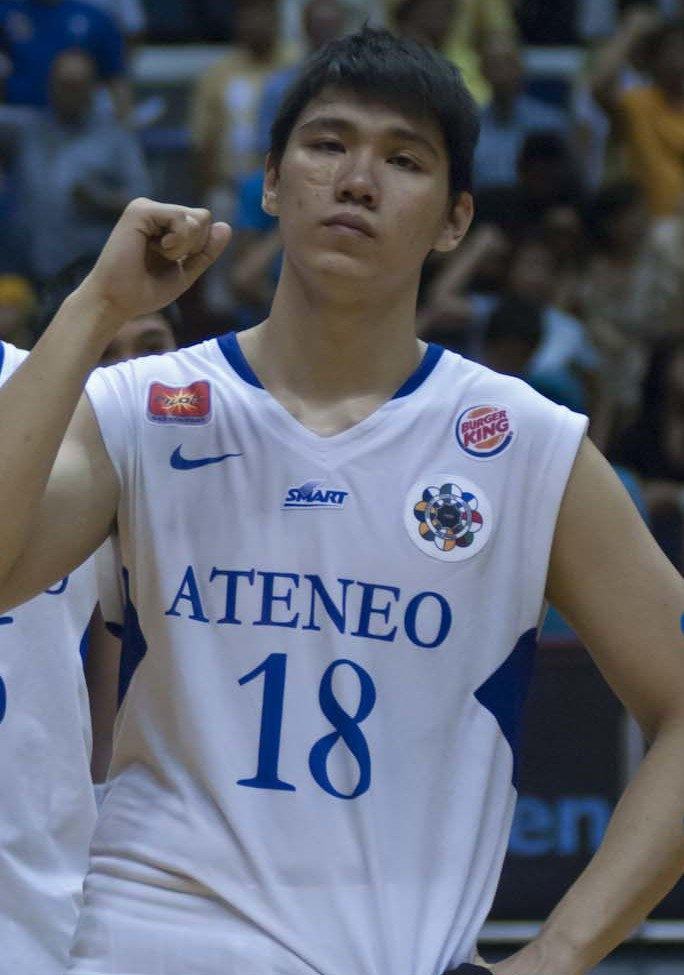
Chua in 2010

Chua's college career started off slow, as he averaged only 0.8 points, 1.6 rebounds, and 0.8 assists in his rookie season, and 2.1 points, 1.8 rebounds and 0.2 assists in his second season. He was able to experience Ateneo's back-to-back championships during that time as a backup to Rabeh Al-Hussaini.

In 2010, Chua got his first college start against a smaller UST Growling Tigers team. He scored the first six points of the game for the Eagles, then had eight points and two blocks in the last six minutes of the game, finishing with 17 points, 11 rebounds, and 4 blocks in the win. He became known as a reliable big man lefty who could shoot jumpers. Ateneo won its third straight championship that year over the FEU Tamaraws.

In Season 75, Ateneo began its "Drive For 5" campaign. In Ateneo's win against FEU, FEU forward Arvie Bringas was caught spitting towards Chua. Bringas was thrown out of the game and FEU suspended him for their next two games. Chua stepped up his play when Ateneo lost its center JP Erram to a knee injury. Ateneo won in the Finals again, in two games. They became the first UAAP team to ever complete a five-peat.

== Professional career ==
=== PBA D-League ===
Chua played for Blackwater Sports in the PBA D-League. He had 17 points in each of the two games of the Finals to help the Elite sweep the four-time defending champions NLEX Road Warriors in the 2013 Foundation Cup.

=== GlobalPort Batang Pier ===
Chua was selected tenth overall in the 2013 PBA draft by San Mig Super Coffee Mixers. He was among six Ateneo players taken in that draft, along with Greg Slaughter, Ryan Buenafe, Nico Salva, Erram, and Chris Sumalinog. Just two days after the draft, he was traded to the GlobalPort Batang Pier along with Leo Najorda to acquire the rights of Globalport's No. 7 pick overall, Isaac Holstein. In GlobalPort's match vs San Mig, he had a costly turnover that lost them the game.

=== San Miguel Beermen ===
After they ended their disappointing campaign in the Commissioner's Cup, GlobalPort traded him to the San Miguel Beermen for Yousef Taha. He joined a frontcourt that included June Mar Fajardo and Doug Kramer. He had just 2 points as he also had three fouls in his debut for the Beermen. He was able to win the 2014-15 Philippine Cup in his time there.

=== Barako Bull Energy ===
In 2015, Chua moved to the Barako Bull Energy in a trade that also involved big men Dorian Peña and Jay-R Reyes and SMB's 2017 1st round pick. In the 2015 Governors' Cup, he had 12 points in a win over the Bolts.

=== Meralco Bolts ===
After his rookie scale contract expired, he agreed to a new contract with the Meralco Bolts. There, he was reunited with his former college coach Norman Black. He had an ACL injury, which impacted his opportunities to play. In the 2017 Commissioner's Cup, he scored all six of his points in the fourth quarter to turn a close game against NLEX into a blowout win. He then had a career-high 14 points while defending import Cory Jefferson in a win over the Alaska Aces.

=== First stint with TNT KaTropa ===
On September 11, 2017, Chua was traded to the TNT KaTropa in exchange of a 2019 second round pick. He only played four games for them.

=== Phoenix Fuel Masters ===
==== 2017–2018 ====
Chua was traded to the TNT KaTropa during the 2017 PBA Draft along with Sidney Onwubere for Jonjon Gabriel and Phoenix's 2019 second round pick. In 2018, he participated in the Obstacle Challenge during All-Star Week.

==== 2019–2021 ====
In the 2019 Philippine Cup, he had a new career-high of 24 points while also grabbing six rebounds against the Bolts. Phoenix could have lost the game in overtime as he missed a game-winning jumper, but his teammate Calvin Abueva was there to rebound the miss and score. The following game, he was punched in the fist by TNT player Michael Miranda. Miranda was then fined P30,000 and suspended for one game. Once again, he also participated in the Obstacle Challenge of that year's All-Star Weekend. That conference, Phoenix made its first-ever semifinals. In the semifinals, they lost to the Beermen in five games out of a best-of-seven series, with him having 18 points and 11 rebounds in the Game 5 loss. In the Commissioner's Cup, he scored a game-winning layup against the Aces.

During the pandemic, Chua prepared for the 2020 season by working on his shooting and by doing plyometrics. Before the season started, interim coach Topex Robinson was made permanent head coach. In the 2020 Philippine Cup, he had a breakout campaign. He started his season with 17 points in a win against Meralco. In a close win over NLEX, he hit two clutch free throws that sealed the win. He had a career-high 17 rebounds against the Beermen. Then, he had 11 rebounds and 5 blocks against the Blackwater Elite. He finished the elimination round with a double-double of 21 points and 10 rebounds against the Rain or Shine Elastopainters. With Coach Robinson's belief, his scoring, three-point shooting, rebounding, and shot-blocking all saw improvement, making him a candidate for the Most Improved Player. They edged the Magnolia Hotshots in the first round, but its finals aspirations fell short as the Fuel Masters lost to the TNT Katropa in the knockout game of the semifinals. Prince Caperal won Most Improved Player over him. But he won the Top Bubble D-Fender award, as he led the league with 1.6 blocks.

In the 2021 Philippine Cup, he had a near double-double of 17 points and nine rebounds. In the Governors' Cup on Christmas Day, he had 19 points in a win against NLEX.

=== NLEX Road Warriors ===
During the 2021 Governors' Cup, the NLEX Road Warriors traded Kris Porter and two draft picks for Chua. When they traded for him, Coach Yeng Guiao compared him to a younger J.R. Quiñahan. He had 15 points on three triples in his winning debut over Ginebra.

=== Second stint with TNT Tropang Giga ===
On January 18, 2023, Chua was traded back to the TNT Tropang Giga in a three-team trade involving TNT, NLEX, and Phoenix Super LPG Fuel Masters.

=== Blackwater Bossing ===
On February 26, 2024, Chua was traded to the Blackwater Bossing in a three-team trade involving Blackwater, TNT, and NLEX Road Warriors.

=== Third stint with TNT Tropang 5G ===
On March 19, 2026, Chua signed with the TNT Tropang 5G.

=== Second stint with Phoenix Super LPG Fuel Masters ===
On June 27, 2026, Chua returns to Phoenix Super LPG as he was signed for the rest of the 2025–26 season.

== PBA career statistics ==
Legend
| GP | Games played | MPG | Minutes per game | FG% | Field-goal percentage |
| 3FG% | 3-point field-goal percentage | 4P% | 4-point field-goal percentage | FT% | Free-throw percentage |
| RPG | Rebounds per game | APG | Assists per game | SPG | Steals per game |
| BPG | Blocks per game | PPG | Points per game | 127 | Career high |

As of the end of 2025–26 season

=== Season-by-season averages ===
| Year | Team | GP | MPG | FG% | 3P% | 4P% | FT% | RPG | APG | SPG | BPG | PPG |
|---|---|---|---|---|---|---|---|---|---|---|---|---|
| 2013–14 | GlobalPort | 29 | 10.7 | .383 | .250 | — | .641 | 2.3 | .4 | .2 | .3 | 3.7 |
| 2013–14 | San Miguel | 29 | 10.7 | .383 | .250 | — | .641 | 2.3 | .4 | .2 | .3 | 3.7 |
| 2014–15 | San Miguel | 27 | 5.9 | .250 | .000 | — | .789 | 1.3 | .2 | .3 | .2 | 1.6 |
| 2014–15 | Barako Bull | 27 | 5.9 | .250 | .000 | — | .789 | 1.3 | .2 | .3 | .2 | 1.6 |
| 2015–16 | Meralco | 2 | 1.5 | .500 | — | — | — | — | — | — | — | 1.0 |
| 2016–17 | Meralco | 28 | 10.9 | .330 | .167 | — | .808 | 1.9 | .3 | .1 | .1 | 3.4 |
| 2016–17 | TNT | 28 | 10.9 | .330 | .167 | — | .808 | 1.9 | .3 | .1 | .1 | 3.4 |
| 2017–18 | Phoenix | 34 | 14.7 | .456 | — | — | .646 | 3.7 | .5 | .6 | .4 | 6.1 |
| 2019 | Phoenix Pulse | 39 | 21.4 | .420 | .231 | — | .767 | 4.4 | .6 | .4 | .7 | 8.9 |
| 2020 | Phoenix Super LPG | 17 | 27.6 | .367 | .345 | — | .822 | 6.6 | 1.5 | .6 | 1.6 | 11.6 |
| 2021 | Phoenix Super LPG | 26 | 18.7 | .376 | .281 | — | .885 | 4.0 | .5 | .4 | .4 | 6.8 |
| 2021 | NLEX | 26 | 18.7 | .376 | .281 | — | .885 | 4.0 | .5 | .4 | .4 | 6.8 |
| 2022–23 | NLEX | 44 | 17.7 | .432 | .261 | — | .766 | 4.2 | .8 | .4 | .5 | 7.9 |
| 2022–23 | TNT | 44 | 17.7 | .432 | .261 | — | .766 | 4.2 | .8 | .4 | .5 | 7.9 |
| 2023–24 | Blackwater | 6 | 17.4 | .429 | .000 | — | .769 | 5.0 | .5 | — | .2 | 7.7 |
| 2024–25 | Blackwater | 33 | 19.7 | .421 | .227 | .000 | .759 | 3.6 | 1.1 | .3 | .4 | 6.8 |
| 2025–26 | TNT | 18 | 7.1 | .452 | .000 | — | .692 | 1.1 | .3 | .2 | .1 | 2.6 |
| 2025–26 | Phoenix Super LPG | 18 | 7.1 | .452 | .000 | — | .692 | 1.1 | .3 | .2 | .1 | 2.6 |
| Career | | 303 | 15.6 | .404 | .276 | .000 | .756 | 3.4 | .6 | .3 | .4 | 6.1 |

== National team career ==
He was a part of the Gilas Pilipinas window for the February window of the 2021 Fiba Asia Cup qualifiers as a replacement for Japeth Aguilar.
