= Ronnie Matias =

Filipino basketball player

No. 5 – Caloocan Batang Kankaloo
- Position: Power forward / small forward
- League: MPBL

Personal information
- Born: November 29, 1983 (age 42) Tondo, Manila, Philippines
- Listed height: 6 ft 4 in (1.93 m)
- Listed weight: 180 lb (82 kg)

Career information
- College: UM
- PBA draft: 2009: 1st round, 8th overall pick
- Drafted by: Burger King Whoppers
- Playing career: 2009–present

Career history
- 2009–2011: Burger King Titans / Whoppers / Air21 Express
- 2011–2013: Rain or Shine Elasto Painters
- 2013–2014: Air21 Express
- 2014: GlobalPort Batang Pier
- 2014: San Mig Super Coffee Mixers / Purefoods Star Hotshots
- 2014–2015: Barako Bull Energy
- 2015–2018: Rain or Shine Elasto Painters
- 2019–2020: Manila Stars
- 2021: Mindoro Tamaraws
- 2022: Manila Stars
- 2022–2023: Sta. Rosa Laguna Lions
- 2023–present: Caloocan Batang Kankaloo / Supremos

Career highlights
- 3× PBA champion (2012 Governors', 2014 Governors', 2016 Commissioner's); PBA All-Rookie Team (2010); MPBL All-Star (2022); PSL champion (2025); PBL Mythical First Team (2009)

Ronnie C. Matias (born November 29, 1983) is a Filipino professional basketball player for Caloocan Batang Kankaloo franchise of the Maharlika Pilipinas Basketball League (MPBL) and Pilipinas Super League (PSL). Matias was drafted 9th overall in the first round of the 2009 PBA draft by the Burger King Titans.

== Basketball career ==
=== Burger King Titans ===
Matias was drafted by the Burger King Titans on the 2009 PBA draft, being picked 9th overall at the first round. Matias played two years for Burger King.

=== Rain or Shine Elasto Painters ===
Matias was traded to Rain or Shine Elasto Painters from Burger King, which was renamed to Air21, along with Ronjay Buenafe in exchange for Sol Mercado and Jay-R Reyes, together with the 2011 and 2013 first-round draft picks of Air21. The Express also acquired Reed Juntilla.

Matias won his first title with Rain or Shine after beating the B-Meg Llamados in the finals of the 2012 PBA Governors' Cup.

=== Air 21 Express ===
He was traded to Air21 Express in exchange for a future draft pick where Matias played for the Express for four months, and after that, Matias was traded to GlobalPort Batang Pier with Carlo Sharma in exchange for Enrico Villanueva.

=== GlobalPort Batang Pier ===
Matias just stayed for a while in this team, he is traded again to the San Mig Super Coffee Mixers in exchange for Yancy de Ocampo and Val Acuña for him and Yousef Taha.

=== San Mig Super Coffee Mixers ===
On June 3, 2014, Matias was traded to San Mig Super Coffee Mixers. The trade was a part of a three-team, seven player trade. After Matias was traded to San Mig Coffee, Matias joked that he will bring a dictionary in order to understand the commands of his new coach, Tim Cone, who is an American citizen.

=== Barako Bull Energy ===
After winning his second PBA championship, Matias was traded again for Mick Pennisi with his teammate fellow bigman Isaac Holstein. He stayed for Purefoods for only 5 months before being traded to Barako.

=== Return to Rain or Shine ===
On 2015, Ronnie Matias was signed up by the Rain or Shine Elasto Painters as a free agent.

== PBA career statistics ==
Legend
GP	Games played	MPG	Minutes per game
FG%	Field-goal percentage	3P%	3-point field-goal percentage	FT%	Free-throw percentage
RPG	Rebounds per game	APG	Assists per game	SPG	Steals per game
BPG	Blocks per game	PPG	Points per game	**Bold**	Career high

Correct as of October 18, 2016

=== Season-by-season averages ===
Year	Team	GP	MPG	FG%	3P%	FT%	RPG	APG	SPG	BPG	PPG
2009–10	Burger King / Air21	38	19.1	**.455**	.343	.678	3.9	1.2	**.4**	**.3**	**7.1**
2010–11	Air21	13	**19.4**	.344	**.467**	.531	**4.7**	**1.8**	.3	.2	6.6
2011–12	Rain or Shine	41	13.7	.432	.391	**.780**	3.0	.8	.2	.2	5.0
2012–13	Rain or Shine	**56**	14.8	.408	.266	.446	3.0	1.1	.3	.2	4.5
2013–14	San Mig Coffee / Air21 / Rain or Shine / GlobalPort	24	10.8	.412	.133	.579	2.3	.5	.2	.0	2.9
2014–15	Star / Barako Bull	9	6.9	.333	.250	.444	1.8	.2	.1	0	1.7
2015–16	Rain or Shine	13	8.8	.304	.143	.667	2.2	.5	.3	0	1.9
Career		194	14.5	.415	.295	.610	3.1	.9	.3	.2	4.8

== Personal life ==
Matias was born on November 29, 1983, in Tondo, Manila. He also spent most of his childhood there. He is currently living with his partner, Monique and has 6 children. He is a devotee of Black Nazarene.

=== Controversy ===
Matias went controversial in 2013, after a commotion that happened on the Smart Araneta Coliseum during a game with Rain or Shine against the Alaska Aces. The police went to the coliseum searching for him with an arrest warrant. Matias said that the case was already five years old and the complaint was made by a certain Arlene Mendoza, accused him for allegedly stealing her wallet. Matias denied the accusations of stealing Mendoza's wallet, and Matias said he was accused because the suspect looked like him. Matias already left the coliseum before the group went. The incident did not happen just once, Matias said that it happened before during a game when he played on the Philippine Basketball League. Matias hired a lawyer after the incident to prove his innocence.
