= Mick Pennisi =

Filipino-Australian basketball player

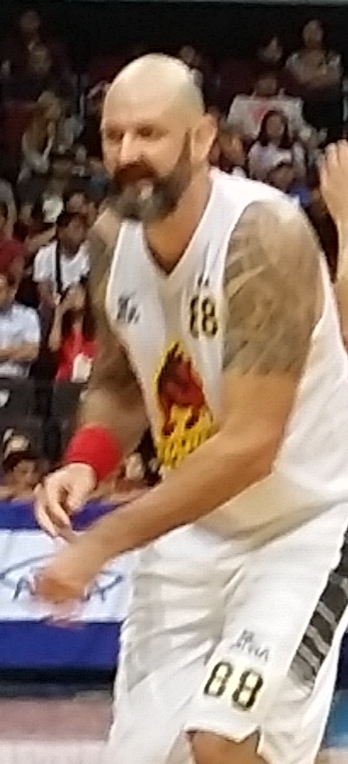
- Pennisi with the Barako Bull Energy in 2015

Personal information
- Born: March 13, 1975 (age 51) Australia
- Listed height: 6 ft 9 in (2.06 m)
- Listed weight: 235 lb (107 kg)

Career information
- College: Eastern Michigan (1994–1997)
- PBA draft: 2000: Direct hire
- Drafted by: Batang Red Bull Energizers
- Playing career: 1995–2017
- Position: Center
- Number: 7, 34, 88

Career history
- 1995–1996; 1998–1999: Townsville Suns/Crocodiles
- 2000–2008: Batang Red Bull Energizers / Batang Red Bull Thunder / Red Bull Barako
- 2008–2011: San Miguel Beermen / Petron Blaze Boosters
- 2011–2014: Barako Bull Energy Cola / Barako Bull Energy
- 2014–2015: Purefoods Star Hotshots / Star Hotshots
- 2015–2016: Barako Bull Energy
- 2016: Phoenix Fuel Masters
- 2016–2017: GlobalPort Batang Pier

Career highlights
- 5× PBA champion (2001 Commissioner's, 2002 Commissioner's, 2005–06 Fiesta, 2009 Fiesta, 2011 Governors'); 2× PBA All-Star (2003, 2009)

Michael Alfio Pennisi (born March 13, 1975) is an Australian-Filipino former professional basketball player. After playing for the Townsville Suns/Crocodiles of the Australian NBL during the 1990s, Pennisi moved to the Philippines in 2000 and played the rest of his career in the Philippine Basketball Association (PBA).

== College career ==
Pennisi played three seasons of college basketball in the United States for the Eastern Michigan Eagles between 1994 and 1997.

== Professional career ==
=== Townsville Crocodiles (1995–1996; 1998–1999) ===
Pennisi made his professional debut with the Townsville Suns of the Australian NBL in the 1995 season. He played a second season with the Suns 1996. For the 1998–99 NBL season, Pennisi returned to Townsville, now known as the Crocodiles.

=== Red Bull Barako (2000–2008) ===
In 2000, Pennisi moved to the Philippines where he was signed by Red Bull Barako, then an expansion team in the Philippine Basketball Association (PBA). There, he was one of the team's stars, along with Lordy Tugade, Junthy Valenzuela, Davonn Harp, and Kerby Raymundo, leading Red Bull to two consecutive Commissioner's Cup championships in 2001 and 2002 PBA Commissioner's Cup. He was also a key player in Red Bull's 2006 PBA Fiesta Conference championship-winning squad.

=== San Miguel Beermen / Petron Blaze Boosters (2008–2011) ===
Pennisi was traded to the San Miguel Beermen after the 2008 PBA Fiesta Conference in exchange for San Miguel's 2010 first round pick (which Red Bull traded to Barangay Ginebra which then used it to pick John Wilson).

=== Barako Bull Energy Cola / Barako Bull Energy (2011–2014) ===
On August 28, 2011, Pennisi was traded by San Miguel to Barako Bull Energy Cola along with Sunday Salvacion and the rights for the 2010 no. 8 pick (which was used by Barako Bull to pick Allein Maliksi for Dondon Hontiveros.

On March 21, 2012, he achieved his 700th career 3-point field goal in the 1st quarter of their game against his former team, Petron Blaze Boosters. He became only the eighth player to achieve such feat joining a list that included Allan Caidic and Ronnie Magsanoc. On the same day also he made a controversy by reacting late in a flop when Will McDonald threw the ball, hitting Mick Pennisi in the head.

=== Purefoods Star Hotshots / Star Hotshots (2014–2015) ===
On December 8, 2014, Pennisi was traded to Purefoods Star Hotshots in exchange for Ronnie Matias and Isaac Holstein.

=== Return to Barako Bull / Phoenix (2015–2016) ===
On September 19, 2015, Pennisi was sent by the Hotshots back to Barako Bull in exchange for Barako Bull's 2017 second round pick.

=== GlobalPort Batang Pier (2016–2017) ===
On November 11, 2016, Pennisi was traded by the Phoenix Fuel Masters to the GlobalPort Batang Pier in exchange for Doug Kramer.

On September 2, 2017, he announced his retirement after playing 17 seasons in the PBA.

== PBA career statistics ==
Legend
GP	Games played	MPG	Minutes per game
FG%	Field-goal percentage	3P%	3-point field-goal percentage	FT%	Free-throw percentage
RPG	Rebounds per game	APG	Assists per game	SPG	Steals per game
BPG	Blocks per game	PPG	Points per game	**Bold**	Career high

=== Season-by-season averages ===
Year	Team	GP	MPG	FG%	3P%	FT%	RPG	APG	SPG	BPG	PPG
2000	Red Bull	35	**39.2**	.425	.351	.710	7.4	**2.3**	**.6**	**1.7**	10.5
2001	Red Bull	41	26.1	.411	.322	.679	6.1	1.2	.2	1.3	7.6
2002	Red Bull	12	23.3	.432	.345	.735	6.5	1.2	.0	.5	8.3
2003	Red Bull	43	25.4	.454	.398	.713	6.4	1.4	.3	.7	10.1
2004–05	Red Bull	32	29.6	.404	.350	.736	7.3	2.0	.2	.8	**11.1**
2005–06	Red Bull	**65**	24.6	.415	.342	.721	6.3	1.4	.3	.8	8.7
2006–07	Red Bull	30	27.8	.367	.349	.696	**7.6**	1.3	.4	1.3	10.8
2007–08	Red Bull	50	27.4	.385	.376	.720	6.4	1.2	.3	.6	8.6
2008–09	San Miguel	57	25.0	.390	.350	.802	5.1	1.2	.3	.7	6.8
2009–10	San Miguel	46	18.6	.419	.400	**.962**	4.1	.8	.2	.6	4.5
2010–11	San Miguel	46	14.8	.385	.275	.882	3.5	.9	.1	.1	3.9
2011–12	Barako Bull	39	23.3	.409	.341	.754	4.5	1.3	.4	.6	7.7
2012–13	Barako Bull	37	23.5	.406	.337	.736	4.5	1.1	.3	.7	8.1
2013–14	Barako Bull	34	23.7	**.458**	**.415**	.767	5.4	1.1	.3	.3	9.0
2014–15	Barako Bull / Star	41	14.5	.338	.289	.654	2.7	.7	.1	.3	3.7
2015–16	Barako Bull / Phoenix	35	17.1	.395	.402	.824	3.2	.7	.1	.4	5.1
2016–17	GlobalPort	19	13.0	.440	.400	.625	2.4	.5	.1	.2	3.5
Career		662	23.3	.407	.355	.748	5.3	1.2	.3	.7	7.5

== Personal life ==
Pennisi's younger brother, David, also played in the Australian NBL.
