= Bobby Jose =

Filipino basketball player (born 1968)

Personal information
- Born: May 11, 1968 (age 58)
- Listed height: 6 ft 4 in (1.93 m)
- Listed weight: 192 lb (87 kg)

Career information
- College: UST
- PBA draft: 1989: 1st round, 5th overall pick
- Drafted by: San Miguel Beermen
- Playing career: 1989–2005
- Position: Power forward / Center
- Number: 6, 8, 32, 33

Career history
- 1989—1991: San Miguel Beermen
- 1992: Alaska Milkmen
- 1993–1994: Ginebra
- 1995–1996: Pepsi Mega
- 1996–1998: Stag Pale Pilseners
- 1999–2001: Tanduay Rhum Masters

Career highlights
- As player: 3× PBA champion (All-Filipino, 1989 Reinforced); Grand Slam champion (1989); 3× PBL champion (1997–98 Makati Mayor's, 1997–98 All-Filipino, 1998–99 Centennial)
Medals
Men's basketball
Representing Philippines
FIBA Asia Under-18 Championship
Gold medal – first place	1986 Manila	Team

Roberto "Bobby" Jose (born May 11, 1968) is a retired Filipino professional basketball player, nicknamed "The Firecracker".

== Playing career ==
A former UST Growling Tiger, Jose started to play for San Miguel Beermen, and won the grand-slam on his rookie year in 1989. He later played for some teams such as Alaska Milkmen, Ginebra, Pepsi Mega.

Later, he played for Stag Pale Pilseners under Alfrancis Chua in the PBL, and when the team became Tanduay Rhum Masters and joined PBA, he also played for the team until 2001, the year of its disbandment.
