= Chris Cantonjos =

Filipino retired basketball player

Personal information
- Born: September 22, 1974 (age 52)
- Listed height: 6 ft 6 in (1.98 m)
- Listed weight: 197 lb (89 kg)

Career information
- High school: Letran (Manila)
- College: UST
- PBA draft: 1999: elevated round
- Drafted by: Tanduay Rhum Masters
- Playing career: 1997–2002
- Position: Power forward / Center
- Number: 33

Career history

Playing
- 1997—1999: Stag Pale Pilseners
- 1999—2001: Tanduay Rhum Masters
- 2002—2004: Purefoods TJ Hotdogs
- 2005—2006: Talk 'N Text Phone Pals

Coaching
- 2011—2013: UST (assistant)
- 2016—2018: UST HS

Career highlights
- As player: PBA champion (2002 Governors'); 4× UAAP Basketball champion (1993, 1994, 1995, 1996); UAAP Most Valuable Player (1995); No. 15 retired by the UST; 3× PBL champion (1997–98 Makati Mayor's, 1997–98 All-Filipino, 1998–99 Centennial); As assistant coach: PCCL champion (2012)

Christopher "Chris" Cantonjos, is a retired Filipino professional basketball player.

== Playing career ==
A former UST Growling Tiger, 4 peat champion and former 1995 UAAP MVP, Cantonjos played for Stag Pale Pilseners in the PBL, while in the PBA teams like Tanduay Rhum Masters, Purefoods, and Talk 'N Text Phone Pals.

While in his final year in 1996, he was assigned as team captain. Due to his accomplishment in UST, his jersey no. 15 was retired.

== Coaching career ==
He later served for his alma mater as an assistant to Pido Jarencio's coaching staff from 2011 until 2013. Cantonjos later served as head coach of the UST's high school team from 2016 until 2018.
