= Antoine Joubert =

American basketball player and coach

- Joubert in Poland in 1997

Oakland Community College Raiders
- Title: Head coach
- League: MCCAA

Personal information
- Born: February 20, 1965 (age 61) Detroit, Michigan, U.S.
- Listed height: 6 ft 5 in (1.96 m)
- Listed weight: 205 lb (93 kg)

Career information
- High school: Southwestern (Detroit, Michigan)
- College: Michigan (1983–1987)
- NBA draft: 1987: 6th round, 134th overall pick
- Drafted by: Detroit Pistons
- Playing career: 1987–2002
- Position: Shooting guard / point guard
- Coaching career: 2003–present

Career history

Playing
- 1988–1989: Sunair Oostende
- 1990–1991: Lechugueros de León
- 1992: Panteras de Miranda
- 1992: Lechugueros de León
- 1993: Dorados de Chihuahua
- 1994: Pueblo Nuevo
- 1995: Panteras de Miranda
- 1995: Caimanes de Barranquilla
- 1996: Stag Pale Pilseners
- 1996–1997: Bobry Bytom
- 1997: Gaiteros del Zulia
- 1997–1998: Bobry Bytom
- 1998–2000: Pogoń Ruda Śląska
- 2000: Panteras de Miranda
- 2000–2001: Hoop Blachy Pruszyński Pruszków
- 2001–2002: Gaiteros del Zulia

Coaching
- 2003–2007: Detroit Panthers
- 2008–present: Oakland CC

Career highlights
- PLK All-Star Game MVP (2000); 3× PLK All-Star (1996, 1999–2000); Baloncesto Profesional Colombiano champion (1995); Liga Profesional de Baloncesto champion (1995); Liga Profesional de Baloncesto MVP (1992); Honorable mention All-American – UPI (1985); Second-team All-Big Ten – UPI (1985); NIT champion (1984); McDonald's All-American (1983); Mr. Basketball of Michigan (1983); First-team Parade All-American (1983); First-team USA Today All-American (1983)
- Stats at Basketball Reference

Antoine Glen Joubert (born February 20, 1965) is an American basketball coach and former professional player. He played high school basketball at Southwestern in his native city of Detroit, Michigan, where he was ranked as one of the best players of his class, winning the Michigan Mr. Basketball award and being named a McDonald's All-American as a senior in 1983. He signed to play for Michigan in college, and was a three-year starter. He was selected in the 6th round of the 1987 NBA draft by the Detroit Pistons but he did not make the team, and went on to have a 15-year career playing professional basketball abroad, winning MVP honors in Venezuela and having notable stints in Mexico and Poland. After retiring from his playing career, Joubert took up coaching, being hired as the head coach of Oakland Community College in 2008. He is nicknamed Judge.

== High school career ==
Joubert was born in Detroit and attended Southwestern High School in the Southwest Detroit area. Joubert played predominantly basketball at Southwestern, but he also played American football, beginning in his junior year. Joubert was part of the varsity basketball team since his freshman year in the 1979–80 season: he played 20 games and recorded 123 points (6.1 per game) and 93 rebounds (4.6 per game). He became one of the main players on the team in his sophomore year, playing as a center, since the guard spot was taken by highly ranked senior Leslie Rockymore. He averaged 19.4 points (446 total) and 10.4 rebounds (239 total) in 23 games, winning the Public School League championship.

In his junior season, Joubert established himself as one of the best players of his class. He moved to play in the backcourt and averaged 30.6 points, scoring 825 total points in the season, one of the highest single-season marks in Michigan high school basketball history. He also posted averages of 16 rebounds and 7 assists per game, shooting 64% from the field, and won his second Public School League championship. He scored 48 points against Wyandotte in the 1982 Class A district finals; his team won, 78–59. He was described as an all-around player who could shoot, defend and score with both hands.

As a senior, Joubert was ranked among the top-5 players in the nation in the 1983 class, with some recruiting services ranking him as number 1 overall. In his senior year, he averaged 31.3 points per game (814 total points in 26 games), another of the all-time best performances in Michigan high school basketball; during the Class A playoffs he scored 44 points in the semifinal game on March 25, 1983, against Southfield, and on March 27 he scored 47 points in the final game against Flint Central. During that game, he shot 20/40 from the field; despite his scoring effort, his team lost, 80–84. His 47 points were the most scored in a state final, and the second-best behind Bob Bolton's 50 points scored in the Quarterfinals in 1956. As of 2019, this performance is third-best overall in postseason state games behind Bolton's 50 points and Keith Appling's 49 (established in 2009 in the state final). He also averaged 14 rebounds and 7 assists during his senior season.

Joubert was ranked by Bob Gibbons of All-Star Sports as the 25th best player in the class of 1983. Joubert was named Michigan Mr. Basketball by the Basketball Coaches Association of Michigan with 576 votes, and he received first-team All-American selections by Parade and USA Today. He was also selected as a McDonald's All-American: in the 1983 game, Joubert scored 4 points, shooting 2/7 from the field.

Joubert finished his career at Southwestern with 2,208 career points over 96 total games played; at the time, he was the only player other than Magic Johnson to score 2,000 points in Michigan high school basketball history.

== College career ==
=== Freshman season ===
Joubert was recruited by several major NCAA Division I programs and received offers from Indiana, Kentucky, Michigan, Michigan State, Northwestern, Purdue and UCLA. He restricted his final choice between Northwestern, Michigan, Purdue and UCLA, and signed to play for Michigan on February 20, 1983. At Michigan, Joubert found his former high school teammate Leslie Rockymore. As a freshman, Joubert started 22 of 33 games, playing 26.5 minutes and averaging 9 points, 2.1 rebounds and 3.1 assists per game; he participated in the 1984 NIT, during which he scored a then career-high 18 points (including 6/6 on free throws) against Xavier in the tournament quarterfinals, and scored 17 points against Virginia Tech in the semifinals. In the final game against Notre Dame, Joubert scored 12 points, the second-best on his team behind Roy Tarpley's 18, and Michigan won the tournament.

=== Sophomore season ===
In his sophomore year at Michigan, Joubert was named a starter by coach Bill Frieder, and he started 28 out of the 29 games he played that season. On January 5, 1985, Joubert scored a new career-high 27 points in an 87–82 win against Ohio State. On January 31 Joubert had 13 assists in a game against Northwestern: at the time it tied the Michigan record for assists in a single game (it has since been passed by Gary Grant, Zavier Simpson and Derrick Walton Jr.). Throughout the season Joubert, who played point guard and shooting guard at Michigan, focused more on passing, and averaged a career-best 5.7 assists per game, leading the team in assists, and was also the second-best scorer at 13.4 points per game, behind Tarpley's 19. Michigan won the Big Ten Conference regular season with a 16–2 record. Joubert participated in the NCAA tournament for the first time in his career, and he played both Michigan games: against Fairleigh Dickinson he had 3 points, 3 rebounds and 5 assists in 27 minutes, while in the following game against Villanova he scored 12 points in 30 minutes of playing time, shooting 6/13 from the field. Joubert was named in the All-Big Ten Second Team by UPI, which also selected him as an Honorable Mention All-American.

=== Junior season ===
As a junior, Joubert started all 33 games of the season. He played 31.8 minutes per game, a slight decrease compared to the 33.7 minutes he played as a sophomore, and he averaged 12.4 points, 2.8 rebounds and 4.7 assists (fifth in the Big Ten), shooting a career-high 49.3% from the field. Joubert played in the backcourt with fellow guard Gary Grant, and joined the frontcourt composed by Butch Wade, Richard Rellford and Roy Tarpley. For the second year in a row, Michigan won the Big Ten regular season, and qualified for the NCAA Tournament. In the 1986 Tournament, Joubert debuted with 12 points against Akron, and scored 11 points (on 5/8 shooting) in the loss against Iowa State. At the end of the season he was an Honorable Mention All-Big Ten selection.

=== Senior season ===
With the graduation of seniors Rellford, Tarpley and Wade, Joubert took more shots in his senior year, increasing his field goal attempts from 10.3 as a junior to 13.9 per game as a senior. On February 26, 1987, Joubert scored a career-high 34 points (13/18 from the field) against Minnesota. Joubert ended up averaging his career best in points as a senior at 15.6, which ranked him third on the team behind Grant (22.4) and sophomore Glen Rice (16.9). He also ranked third in assists per game with 3.7, behind Grant (5.4) and Garde Thompson (4.7). With the introduction of the three-point line, Joubert shot 3.5 threes per game, with a 35.7% three-point shooting percentage for the season. Joubert also played during the 1987 NCAA tournament, scoring 6 points against Navy on March 12, and a personal tournament-high 20 points (7/18 from the field), along with 6 rebounds and 3 assists, in the loss to North Carolina on March 14. For the second consecutive season, Joubert was an Honorable Mention All-Big Ten selection.

Joubert scored 1,594 career points, which ranked him 8th in Michigan history at the time of his retirement (16th as of 2019). His 539 assists rank him 4th all-time as of 2020.

=== College statistics ===
Year	Team	GP	GS	MPG	FG%	3P%	FT%	RPG	APG	SPG	BPG	PPG
1983–84	Michigan	33	22	26.5	.449	–	.741	2.1	3.1	.7	.0	9.0
1984–85	Michigan	29	28	33.7	.447	–	.729	3.0	5.7	.8	.0	13.4
1985–86	Michigan	33	33	31.8	.493	–	.747	2.8	4.7	.9	.0	12.4
1986–87	Michigan	32	32	33.3	.439	.357	.707	3.7	3.7	.6	.0	15.6
Career		127	115	31.3	.456	.357	.731	2.9	4.2	.7	.0	12.6

== Professional career ==
After the end of his college career, Joubert was drafted by the Detroit Pistons in the sixth round of the 1987 NBA draft (134th overall). He joined the team in the summer and was kept in the roster during training camps until October 1987. He was later waived by the Pistons before the start of the 1987–88 NBA season. In December 1987, Joubert was drafted in the International Basketball Association (later World Basketball League), a league for players 6 ft 5 in (1.96 m) and under, being selected by the Chicago Express. Joubert then spent a part of the 1987–88 season with the Tulsa Fast Breakers in the Continental Basketball Association (CBA), but he never played for the team. In the summer of 1988, Joubert played in the Summer Pro League with the Atlanta Hawks. He later moved to Belgium, where he spent his first professional season abroad with Sunair Oostende, with which he also participated in the 1988–89 FIBA European Champions Cup.

In 1990 he went to Mexico and signed for Lechugueros de León, a team that played in the Circuito Mexicano de Básquetbol (CIMEBA), the Mexican national basketball league. In 1991 he scored a season-high 59 points during the league playoffs; that season he had broken the 50-point mark twice, as he had scored 52 on September 29 in a 122–125 loss vs. Dorados de Chihuahua, and 56 on September 30 against Pioneros de Delicias in a 114–127 loss. He was also selected in the 1992 All-Star game, and scored 33 points. In 1992, Joubert played the first part of the year for Panteras de Miranda in the Venezuelan Liga Profesional de Baloncesto, where he received the MVP award. That season he also established the league record for most points scored in a single game (no overtime) with 67 against Trotamundos de Carabobo on May 16, 1992. In the second half of 1992, Joubert averaged 31.0 points per game with Lechugueros in Mexico, and was again selected to play in the All-Star game, scoring 31 points. In the 1992 CIMEBA season, Joubert scored 64 points against Bravos. In 1993 he moved to another Mexican team, Dorados de Chihuahua, and scored a total of 1,048 points during the season, with an average of 31.7; he also averaged 5.3 assists per game.

In 1994 Joubert moved to the Dominican Republic and played for Pueblo Nuevo. In the first half of 1995 he signed again with Panteras de Miranda, and was part of the team that won the 1995 Liga Profesional de Baloncesto title. In November 1995 he played with Caimanes de Barranquilla in the Colombian league, the Copa Costeñita, and won another league title.

He signed with Stag Pale Pilseners in the Philippines, and played during the Reinforced Conference phase of the 1995–96 Philippine Basketball League season. In 1996 he signed for Bobry Bytom in the Polish Basketball League; in his first stint in Poland, Joubert averaged 21.9 points over 49 games, and participated in the PLK All-Star Game. After playing for Gaiteros del Zulia in Venezuela, Joubert went back to Bobry Bytom for the following season, and in 1997–98 he averaged 15.9 points per game in 48 appearances. He moved to Pogoń Ruda Śląska for the 1998–99 season and he posted averages of 24 points, 4.9 rebounds, 5 assists and 1.4 steals in 38.7 minutes per game; he was named again to take part in the PLK All-Star Game. He stayed with the club also for the following season, and averaged 18.6 points, 4.2 rebounds, 3.8 assists and 1.1 steals; he received his third All-Star selection, and was named the All-Star Game MVP.

He joined Hoop Blachy Pruszyński Pruszków in 2000, and in the 2000–01 season, his last in Poland, he averaged 16.2 points, 4.3 rebounds, 3.2 assists and 1.5 steals per game. He then retired in 2002, after playing in Venezuela for Gaiteros del Zulia.

== Coaching career ==
After retiring from professional basketball, Joubert worked at Chrysler and Ford. In 2003 he started coaching the Detroit Panthers, a team of which he also was part-owner, until 2007; he coached the team in the ABA. In 2008 he was hired as head coach at Oakland Community College in Oakland County, Michigan.
