= 2007–08 Philippine Basketball League season =

2007–08 PBL season
- Duration: October 20, 2007 – May 28, 2008
- Teams: 7 + 1
- TV partner: Basketball TV (RPN 9)
- Season MVP: Jayson Castro
- V-Go Extreme Energy Drink Cup champions: Harbour Centre Batang Pier
- V-Go Extreme Energy Drink Cup runners-up: Hapee Toothpaste
- Lipovitan Amino Sports Drink Cup champions: Harbour Centre Batang Pier
- Lipovitan Amino Sports Drink Cup runners-up: Hapee Toothpaste

Seasons
- 2006-07 2008-09

The 2007–08 season of the Philippine Basketball League (PBL).

== 2007 V-Go Extreme Energy Drink Cup ==
Team Standings	Win	Loss	Coach
Hapee Toothpaste	7	0	Jun Noel
Harbour Centre Batang Pier	6	1	Jorge Gallent
RP Team	5	2	Junel Baculi
San Mig Coffee	3	4	Koy Banal
Toyota-Balintawak Road Kings	3	4	Ariel Vanguardia
Mail and More Comets	3	4	Allan Gregorio
Pharex Medics	1	6	Gian Carlo Tan
Bacchus Energy Drink Raiders	0	7	Lawrence Chongson

The Harbour-Philippine team bound for the Southeast Asian Games in Thailand, wrapped up their guest stint in the PBL with five wins and two losses against the seven regular ballclubs.

A unique phase in the tournament called the pool round, gives gasping squads a last shot at advancing to the quarterfinals. Top teams Hapee and Harbour Centre, along with San Mig Coffee were in Pool A. The four lower seeded teams are in Pool B.

Hapee Toothpaste, who advances to the best-of-three semifinals outright, remain unbeaten for nine games after winning over Harbour and San Mig Coffee in the Pool A round-robin.

=== Hapee vs Toyota-Balintawak (Best-of-three semifinals) ===
December 20

Hapee Toothpaste 83, Toyota-Balintawak 80

Rizal Memorial Coliseum, Manila

December 22

Hapee Toothpaste 94, Toyota-Balintawak 91
Hapee wins series, 2–0

The Arena in San Juan, San Juan City

=== Harbour vs San Mig Coffee (Best-of-three semifinals) ===
December 20

Harbour Centre Batang Pier 72, San Mig Coffee 80

Rizal Memorial Coliseum, Manila

December 22

Harbour Centre Batang Pier 82, San Mig Coffee 77

The Arena in San Juan, San Juan City

December 23

Harbour Centre Batang Pier 79, San Mig Coffee 67
Harbour wins series, 2–1

Rizal Memorial Coliseum, Manila

=== V-Go Extreme Energy Drink Cup finals ===
December 27

Harbour Centre Batang Pier 69, Hapee Toothpaste 72

Rizal Memorial Coliseum, Manila

December 29

Harbour Centre Batang Pier 73, Hapee Toothpaste 59

Rizal Memorial Coliseum, Manila

December 30

Harbour Centre Batang Pier 94, Hapee Toothpaste 88 (OT)
Harbour wins series, 2–1

Rizal Memorial Coliseum, Manila

Harbour ended Hapee's 12-game winning streak following a 73–59 victory in Game two and tied the series at one game apiece. The following day in the deciding third game of the best-of-three title series, Harbour Centre came back from 19 points down and forces overtime at 78-all, before winning, 94–88, as Batang Pier captured a record four straight PBL crown. Harbour Centre's TY Tang was honored as the Finals Most Valuable Player.

== 2008 Lipovitan Amino Sports Drink Cup ==
Team Standings	Win	Loss	Coach
Harbour Centre Batang Pier	13	2	Jorge Gallent
Hapee Toothpaste Complete Protectors	10	5	Louie Alas
Burger King Whoppers	9	6	Allan Gregorio
San Mig Coffee	7	8	Koy Banal
Toyota-Otis Sparks	7	8	Ariel Vanguardia
Pharex Medics	7	8	Gian Carlo Tan
Noosa Shoes	6	9	Leo Isaac
Bacchus Energy Drink Raiders	5	10	Lawrence Chongson
Nokia RP Youth	0	8	Franz Pumaren

Burger King was the former Mail and More while Noosa Shoes is formerly Blu Detergent.

Burger King clinch the third semifinals berth by downing Pharex Medics, 77–71. San Mig Coffee claimed the fourth and last semis ticket by winning against Toyota-Otis Sparks, 68–64.

Harbour Centre scored a 3–0 sweep over San Mig Coffee in their best-of-five semifinal series to advance into their familiar territory in the finals. Hapee Toothpaste sealed another championship rematch with Harbour by scoring a 3–1 series victory over Burger King.

=== Lipovitan Amino Sports Drink Cup finals ===
May 21

Harbour Centre Batang Pier 73, Hapee Toothpaste 74

Batangas City Sports Complex, Batangas City

May 24

Harbour Centre Batang Pier 93, Hapee Toothpaste 81

Governor Ayong Maliksi Gym, Trece Martires, Cavite

May 26

Harbour Centre Batang Pier 90, Hapee Toothpaste 78

Jose P. Laurel Gym, Tanauan City, Batangas

May 28

Harbour Centre Batang Pier 86, Hapee Toothpaste 73
Harbour wins series, 3–1

Batangas City Sports Complex, Batangas City

Batang Pier made a huge 19–0 run in the second quarter to pull away in Game four and grab a historic fifth consecutive PBL title. League MVP Jason Castro was also voted the finals Most Valuable Player as he led the onslaught that gave Harbour a 41–26 lead over Hapee at halftime. Harbour won the last three games in convincing fashion after losing Game one by one point to the Complete Protectors.

=== 2007-08 Season Awards ===
- Most Valuable Player: Jayson Castro (Harbour)
- Finals MVP: Jayson Castro (Harbour)
- Most Improved Player: Chito Jaime (Toyota-Otis)
- Fantastic Freshman Award: Gabe Norwood (Hapee)
- Instant Impact Award: Reed Juntilla (Hapee)
- True Gentleman Award: Dylan Ababou (Harbour)
- Mythical First Team
  - Jayson Castro (Harbour)
  - Gabe Norwood (Hapee)
  - Mark Borboran (Hapee)
  - Larry Rodriguez (Hapee)
  - Chad Alonzo (Harbour)
- Mythical Second Team
  - TY Tang (Harbour)
  - Solomon Mercado (Harbour)
  - Jervy Cruz (Hapee)
  - Bonbon Custodio (Magnolia)
  - Neil Rañeses (Magnolia)
