= Leon Trimmingham =

American basketball player

Personal information
- Born: January 2, 1971 (age 55) Saint Croix, U.S. Virgin Islands
- Listed height: 6 ft 7 in (2.01 m)
- Listed weight: 231 lb (105 kg)

Career information
- High school: St. Croix Central (Saint Croix, U.S. Virgin Islands)
- College: American–Puerto Rico (1988–1989); Briar Cliff (1990–1993)
- NBA draft: 1993: undrafted
- Playing career: 1994–2005
- Position: Power forward

Career history
- 1994–1995: Sydney Kings
- 1995–1996: Löwen Braunschweig
- 1996–1997: Adelaide 36ers
- 1997: Gordon's Gin Boars
- 1998: Marinos de Oriente
- 1998–1999: Daiwa Securities Hot Blizzards
- 1999: Atléticos de San Germán
- 2000: Boca Juniors
- 2001: Cangrejeros de Santurce
- 2002–2003: Seoul SK Knights
- 2004–2005: Hapoel Jerusalem

Career highlights
- BSN champion (2001); BSN Finals MVP (2001); LPB champion (1998); LBP Most Valuable Player (1998); All-NBL First Team (1994); All-NBL Second Team (1995); First-team NAIA All-American (1993); Second-team NAIA All-American (1992)

Leon Leroy Trimmingham (born January 2, 1971) is an American former professional basketball player. He played college basketball for the Briar Cliff Chargers. Trimmingham played professionally in Australia, Germany, the Philippines, Venezuela, Japan, Puerto Rico, Argentina, South Korea and Israel. He was a member of the Virgin Islands national team.

== Early life ==
Trimmingham is a native of Saint Croix in the United States Virgin Islands. His father, Leroy, was a reggae musician and his mother, Dorita, was a part-owner of several KFC franchises in the Virgin Islands. Trimmingham grew up playing tennis with his father and only started playing basketball as a teenager. Trimmingham attended St. Croix Central High School where he was cut twice before finally making the basketball team which was considered the top prep team in the Virgin Islands. He played with the Virgin Islands national team at a pre-Olympic Tournament in 1988 where he first gained attention for his basketball abilities. Trimmingham received offers to play college basketball in the United States at the NCAA Division I level but decided to stay close to home and enrolled at the American University of Puerto Rico.

== College career ==
Trimmingham spent his freshman season at American University of Puerto Rico. He was encouraged to transfer to Briar Cliff University by former player Mario Butler who was an assistant coach for the American University women's team. Trimmingham took a redshirt year after he transferred to Briar Cliff.

Trimmingham played three seasons for the Briar Cliff Chargers and scored 2,023 points. Trimmingham was selected to the National Association of Intercollegiate Athletics (NAIA) All-American first-team in 1993 and second-team in 1992. He led Briar Cliff to an overall record of 79–16 and made national tournament appearances in all three seasons.

== Professional career ==
Trimmingham began his professional career with the Sydney Kings of the Australian National Basketball League (NBL) in 1994. He averaged 27.0 points and 10.7 rebounds per game and was selected to the All-NBL First Team. Trimmingham averaged 27.5 points and 11.5 rebounds per game with the Kings during the 1995 season and was named to the All-NBL Second Team.

Trimmingham joined Löwen Braunschweig in Germany for the 1995–96 season and averaged 18.8 points and 9.5 rebounds per game.

Trimmingham moved to the Adelaide 36ers of the NBL in 1996 and played there for two seasons. He averaged 21.5 points and 6.8 rebounds. Trimmingham played for the Gordon's Gin Boars in the Philippines in 1997.

Trimmingham played for Marinos de Oriente of Venezuela in 1998. He won the Liga Profesional de Baloncesto (LPB) championship and was chosen as the LPB Most Valuable Player.

Trimmingham played for Daiwa Securities Hot Blizzards in Japan during the 1998–99 season and averaged 23 points and 6 rebounds per game. He joined Atléticos de San Germán of the Puerto Rican Baloncesto Superior Nacional (BSN) in 1999 and averaged 23 points and 7 rebounds per game.

Trimmingham played for Boca Juniors of Argentina in 2000 and led the league in scoring with 24.2 points per game. He returned to the BSN in 2001 with the Cangrejeros de Santurce where he led the team to its fourth-straight championship and was chosen as Finals Most Valuable Player. Trimmingham played for the Seoul SK Knights in South Korea during the 2002–03 season.

On August 5, 2004, Trimmingham signed with Hapoel Jerusalem. On March 9, 2005, he was released by the team.

== National team career ==
Trimmingham played for the Virgin Islands national team. He played at the 2001 Centrobasket, and the 2003 Tournament of the Americas.

== Legacy ==
Trimmingham was inducted in the Briar Cliff Athletics Hall of Fame in 2002.

Trimmingham was named to the Sydney Kings 25th Anniversary Team in 2013.
