= Alfrancis Chua =

Filipino basketball executive and coach (born 1966)

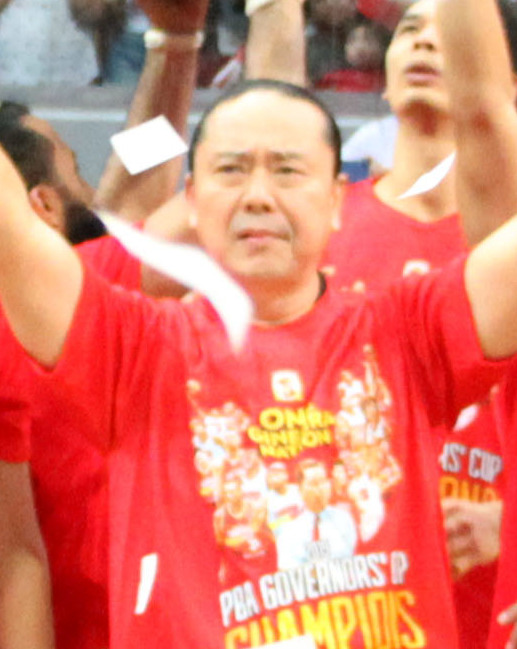
- Chua in 2020

Barangay Ginebra San Miguel
- Position: Board governor / Team manager
- League: PBA

Personal information
- Born: January 17, 1966 (age 60)

Career information
- College: UST
- Coaching career: 1995–2013

Career history

Playing
- c. 1988–1989: Philips Sardines

Coaching
- 1995–1996: Stag Pale Pilseners
- 1997–1999: Tanduay Rhum Masters
- 1997–1998: Pop Cola 800s (assistant)
- 1999–2000: Tanduay Rhum Masters
- 2000–2002: Sta. Lucia Realtors (assistant)
- 2003–2007: Sta. Lucia Realtors
- 2007–2009: Sta. Lucia Realtors (assistant)
- 2012–2013: Barangay Ginebra San Miguel (consultant)
- 2013: Barangay Ginebra San Miguel

Career highlights
- As head coach: PBA All-Star Game head coach (1999); 7× PBL champion (1995–96 Reinforced, 1995–96 All-Filipino, 1995–96 Danny Floro, 1996 Danny Floro, 1997–98 Makati Mayor's, 1997–98 All-Filipino, 1998–99 Centennial); As assistant coach: 2× PBA champion (2001 Governors', 2008 Philippine); As executive:*: 19× PBA champion (2016 Philippine, 2016 Governors', 2017 Philippine, 2017 Commissioners', 2017 Governors', 2018 Philippine, 2018 Commissioners', 2018 Governors', 2019 Philippine, 2019 Commissioners', 2019 Governors', 2020 Philippine, 2021 Governors', 2022 Philippine, 2022–23 Commissioner's, 2023–24 Commissioners', 2025 Philippine, 2025-26 Philippine, 2026 Commissioner's); 3× PBA Executive of the Year (2018, 2021, 2024); * - The championships are all from the 3 SMC teams, as sports director of San Miguel Corporation, including as General Manager of Barangay Ginebra

Alfrancis P. Chua (born January 17, 1966) is a Filipino sports executive and former basketball player and coach. He is currently the team manager of Barangay Ginebra San Miguel and the sports director of San Miguel Corporation (SMC), overseeing the professional sports teams of the SMC group (Barangay Ginebra San Miguel, the San Miguel Beermen, and the Magnolia Hotshots).

== Early life ==
Alfrancis Chua was born on January 17, 1966. He is the eight of nine children of a businessman who owned a garments family business. He learned basketball with his brothers while attending Grace Christian High School. He later studied at the UST High School and the University of Santo Tomas.

== Playing career ==
Chua played for the UST Glowing Goldies in the University Athletic Association of the Philippines (UAAP). He also coached the junior team of UST while being a member of the senior team.

He later played for Philips Sardines at the Philippine Amateur Basketball League (PABL) under coach Joe Lipa. Around this time, Chua was already being groomed for a future coaching role by Lipa. He also played for a team in Taiwan, on a two-year contract with a salary of $4,800.

== Coaching career ==
=== Philippine Basketball League (PBL) ===
==== Stag Pale Pilseners (1995–1996) ====
Chua was the head coach of the Stag Pale Pilseners in the Philippine Basketball League. He achieved the grand slam during the franchise's debut 1995–1996 season, winning the Reinforced Conference, All-Filipino Cup and the Danny Floro Cup. After two seasons, Stag won four of the six tournaments held.

==== Tanduay Gold Rhum Masters (1997–1999) ====
The Stag franchise was renamed the Tanduay Gold Rhum Masters in the 1997–1998 season, where Chua piloted the team to another grand slam. During the 1998–1999 season, the team emerged as champion during the 1st Yakult-PBL Centennial Cup and runner-up during the 2nd Yakult-PBL Centennial Cup. Shortly after, the franchise would leave the PBL and move to the Philippine Basketball Association (PBA), marking the return of Tanduay to the PBA.

=== Philippine Basketball Association (PBA) ===
==== Pop Cola Panthers (1998) ====
While coaching Tanduay in the PBL, he was also an assistant coach for Norman Black with the Pop Cola Panthers in the Philippine Basketball Association.

==== Tanduay Gold Rhum Masters (1999–2000) ====
Tanduay re-entered the PBA in 1999 PBA season with Chua as head coach. He led the team to a runner-up finish in the 1999 PBA All-Filipino Cup. In that season, he was selected to be the head coach of Rookies, Sophomores and Juniors in 1999 PBA All-Star Game.

Chua remained as head coach until the 2000 season. He was succeeded by Derrick Pumaren in the 2001 season, Tanduay's final season.

==== Sta. Lucia Realtors (2001–2007) ====
In 2001, Chua joined the Sta. Lucia Realtors as assistant coach under Norman Black. In 2003, Chua was appointed as head coach and led Sta. Lucia to two semifinal appearances during the season (2003 PBA All-Filipino Cup and 2003 PBA Reinforced Conference). In February 2007, Sta. Lucia announced that Chua was moved to the position of team consultant and assistant coach Boyet Fernandez appointed as the new head coach, and Chua was demoted as team consultant.

==== Barangay Ginebra San Miguel (2012–2013) ====
Chua returned to the PBA in January 2012, joining Barangay Ginebra San Miguel as team consultant. On January 1, 2013, Chua was appointed as head coach and led the team to a runner-up finish during the 2013 PBA Commissioner's Cup.

On July 25, 2013, San Miguel Corporation, owner of Barangay Ginebra San Miguel, announced that Chua was appointed as team manager and Ato Agustin would assume the position of interim coach for the 2013 PBA Governor's Cup.

== Executive career ==
Concurrent with Chua's assumption as team manager of Barangay Ginebra San Miguel, he was appointed as alternate PBA governor representing Ginebra San Miguel, Inc. (GSMI) in the PBA board. On July 17, 2015, The Philippine Star reported Chua's promotion to full-time PBA governor for GSMI and his appointment as sports director for San Miguel Corporation.

In June 2015, Chua was elected as president of the Basketball Coaches Association of the Philippines (BCAP), succeeding Chito Narvasa. He was succeeded by Louie Gonzales in June 2019.

In February 2018, Chua was appointed special assistant to the rector for sports development of his high school alma mater, Colegio de San Juan de Letran.

Chua was awarded the Danny Floro Executive of the Year by the PBA Press Corps for the years 2018, 2021, and 2024.

=== Gilas Pilipinas ===
Chua appointed as team manager of the men's national team for the 2022 Asian Games. The team won the gold medal after 61 years (1962). On November 20, 2024, the SBP announced the appointment of Chua as program director and team manager for Gilas Pilipinas men's and youth teams.

== Commentary career ==
In the 1990s, Chua was an occasional guest analyst in PBA games coverage.

== Personal life ==
Chua married Jocelyn Penaloza with whom he have four children. He first met his eventual wife in high school.

Preceded by Turo Valenzona	Tanduay Rhum Masters head coach 1999-2000	Succeeded by Derrick Pumaren
Preceded by Norman Black	Sta. Lucia Realtors head coach 2003-2007	Succeeded by Boyet Fernandez
Preceded by Siot Tanquingcen	Barangay Ginebra San Miguel head coach 2013	Succeeded by Ato Agustin
