= 1993 Philippine Basketball League season =

1993 PBL season
- Duration: March 27 - December 22, 1993
- Teams: 6 + 1
- TV partner: IBC
- Season MVP: Rey Evangelista; Dennis Espino
- Maharlika Cup champions: Nikon Home Partners
- Maharlika Cup runners-up: Burger Machine
- President Ramos Cup champions: Burger Machine
- President Ramos Cup runners-up: Instafood

Seasons
- 1991-92 1994

The 1993 season of the Philippine Basketball League (PBL).

== League crisis ==
With an exodus of top amateur players to the pro ranks, the Philippine Basketball League (PBL) suffered. The state of the league was dire when it opened on March 27 at the Cuneta Astrodome. It received no TV or radio coverage at the time. Newspapers also ignored the PBL. No major network aired PBL games and the league suffered from a lack of television coverage during the season.

== Franchise shifts ==
- The Triple-V Foodmasters disbanded their franchise at the start of the season.
- The three-time finalist Sta. Lucia Realtors moved over to the pro ranks as a new team in the PBA. Their PBL team was sold to Otto Shoes.
- League officials found venues before the season began. Every Monday and Wednesday, the league played at the ULTRA. On Saturday, play shifted to the Cuneta Astrodome in Pasay.
- 10 PBL players were bound by a league rule prohibiting them from taking a leave of absence during a PBL tournament without permission of their mother teams. Players Dennis Espino, Rey Evangelista, Kenneth Duremdes, Marlou Aquino, Patrick Fran, Noli Locsin, Boybits Victoria, Richie Ticzon, Edward Feihl and Expedito Falcasantos had to decide the night they were going to leave for Hong Kong for the 22-under ABC tournament. The players held a meeting and decided to stay put in the PBL. As a result, they were indefinitely suspended by the Basketball Association of the Philippines (BAP).
- Philip "Popoy" Juico became the new PBL commissioner after the Maharlika Cup tournament, replacing Ogie Narvasa, the next offing was named after President Fidel V. Ramos, wherein Juico was part of President Ramos' cabinet members. The PBL President Ramos Cup opened on October 16 at the Araneta Coliseum.

== Participating teams (coach) ==
- Nikon Home Appliances (Orly Castelo) *New team
- Casino Rubbing Alcohol (Willie Generalao)
- Burger Machine (Perry Ronquillo)
- Otto Shoes (Adonis Tierra)
- Instafood Mealmasters (Francis Rodriguez) *Formerly Magnolia
- Rica Hotdogs (Roehl Nadurata) *Formerly Swift
- Chowking Fastfood Kings (Joel Banal) *New team in the President Ramos Cup

== Maharlika Cup ==
Qualified for finals

#	Team Standings	Cumulative				SF	
#	Team Standings	W	L	PCT	GB	W	L
1	Nikon Electric Fan	12	6	.667	–-	6	2
2	Burger Machine	11	7	.611	1	4	4
3	Instafood	10	8	.556	2	3	5
4	Otto Shoes	9	9	.500	3	4	4
5	Casino Rubbing Alcohol	8	10	.444	4	3	5

Burger Machine and Instafood finished atop the standings after the eliminations. In the semifinal round, newcomer Nikon Appliances won six of their eight assignments to advance into the championship against Burger Machine.

Behind the play of Noli Locsin, Rey Evangelista, Jeffrey Cariaso and Rudolf Belmonte, Nikon won their first title. They defeated the Burger Specialists, three games to two, in the finals.

=== Finals series ===
Team	Game 1 (May 28)	Game 2 (May 30)	Game 3 (June 1)	Game 4 (June 4)	Game 5 (June 8)	Wins
Nikon	89	86	L	99	104	3
Burger Machine	82	88	W	91	78	2
Venue	Cuneta	Cuneta	Cuneta	Cuneta	Cuneta

== President Ramos Cup ==
Qualified for finals

#	Team Standings	Cumulative				SF	
#	Team Standings	W	L	PCT	GB	W	L
1	Burger Machine	13	7	.667	–-	5	3
2	Instafood	13	7	.667	--	3	5
3	Otto Shoes	13	7	.667	--	4	4
4	Nikon Electric Fan	11	9	.555	2	4	4
5	Casino Rubbing Alcohol	9	11	.450	4	4	4

Burger Machine earn their second trip to the finals in the season. They finished the two-round semifinals in a three-way tie with Instafood and Otto Shoes with identical 13 wins and 7 losses, but they automatically clinched the first finals slot by virtue of a better quotient.

Instafood ousted Otto Shoes, 58–56, in a playoff to set up a finals showdown with Burger Machine.

In the championship series, the Mealmasters led two games to one, but the Burgers extended the series by taking Game Four, 85–78, and won their first championship by edging out the Mealmasters, 64–62, in the deciding fifth game.

=== Finals series ===
Team	Game 1 (Dec.16)	Game 2 (Dec.18)	Game 3 (Dec.19)	Game 4 (Dec.21)	Game 5 (Dec.22)	Wins
Burger Machine	65	69	68	85	64	3
Instafood	56	78	69	78	62	2
Venue	Cuneta	Pampanga	Cuneta	Cuneta	Cuneta
