= Michael Britt =

American basketball player

Personal information
- Born: October 7, 1960 Suffolk, Virginia, U.S.
- Died: December 25, 2017 (aged 57) Smithfield, Virginia, U.S.
- Listed height: 6 ft 7 in (2.01 m)
- Listed weight: 185 lb (84 kg)

Career information
- High school: Suffolk (Suffolk, Virginia)
- College: District of Columbia (1979–1983)
- NBA draft: 1983: 2nd round, 32nd overall pick
- Drafted by: Washington Bullets
- Position: Small forward
- Number: 21, 22

Career history
- 1983: Louisville Catbirds
- 1983–1984: Albuquerque Silvers

Career highlights
- Liga Profesional de Baloncesto MVP (1985)
- Stats at Basketball Reference

Michael Antonio Britt (October 7, 1960 – December 25, 2017) was an American professional basketball player who was selected by the Washington Bullets in the second round (32nd overall) of the 1983 NBA draft. A 6'6" forward from the University of the District of Columbia.

Dubbed the "Flying Pencil" by David Remnick of The Washington Post, as some scouts felt his slender frame was too lean for his height, Britt had a phenomenal freshman season at District of Columbia, averaged 24.3 points and 12.4 rebounds in 16 games with the Firebirds varsity. As a sophomore in the 1980–81 season, Britt was joined by 6'10" center Earl Jones, forming an explosive combination, and in 1982, Britt was named the outstanding player in the NCAA Division II tournament and the Firebirds won the championship with a 25–5 overall mark.

Britt had his first taste of International competition at the Jones Cup in Taipei in 1982, An incoming senior that year, Britt combined forces with such stars as Chris Mullin and Aubrey Sherrod to power the United States to the championship under coach George Raveling. He was chosen by the Washington Bullets as their second round draft pick in 1983 but never played a game with the team. Britt joined the Louisville Catbirds of the Continental Basketball Association and later played for the Albuquerque Silvers of the same league. Britt split the 1983–84 season between the two teams, averaging 12.2 points and 4.7 rebounds in 40 games.

Britt died on December 25, 2017, at 57.
