= Aaron Harper (basketball) =

American basketball player (1981–2023)

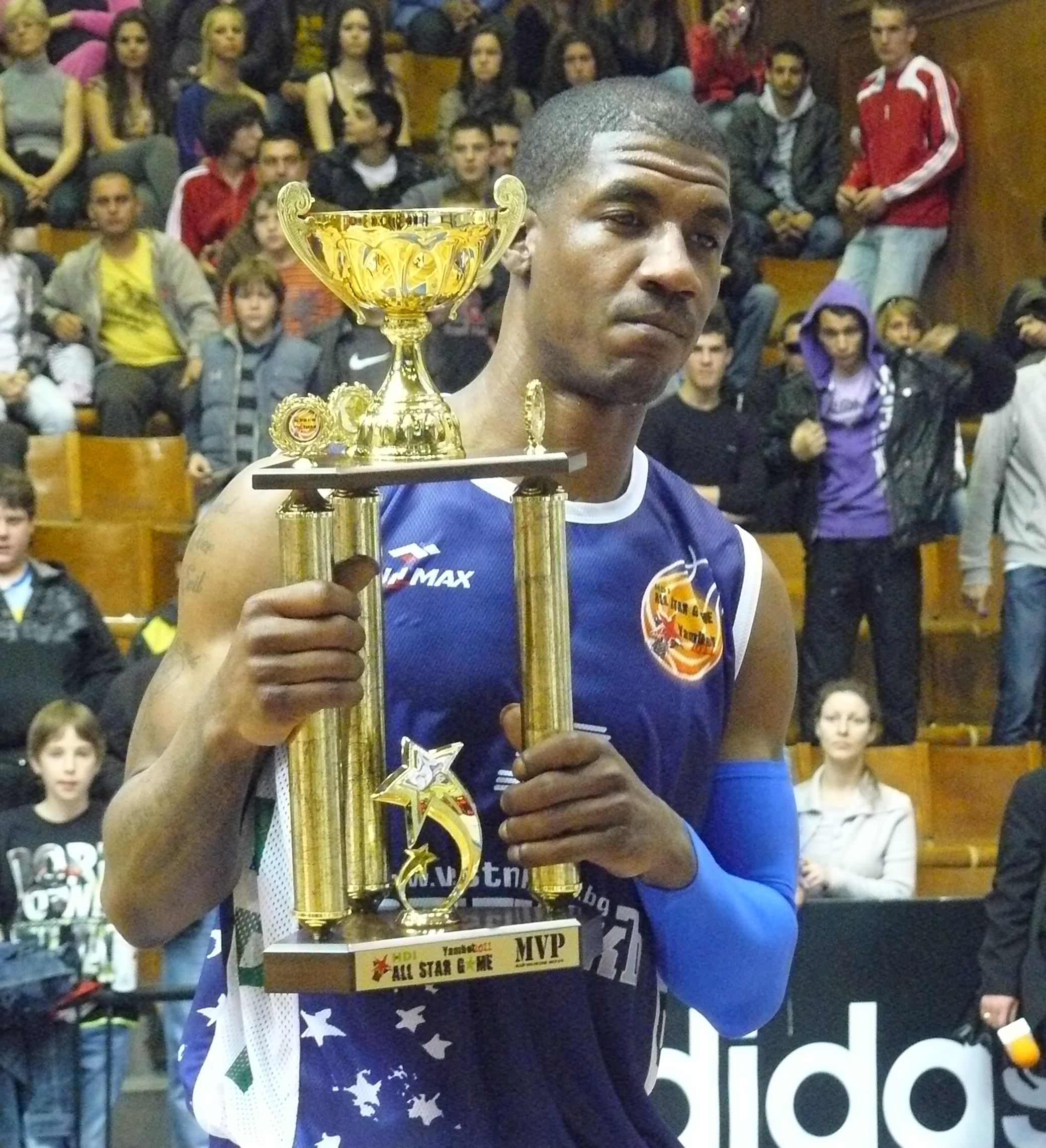
- Harper holds the Bulgarian League All-Star Game MVP trophy in 2011

Personal information
- Born: March 12, 1981 Jackson, Mississippi, U.S.
- Died: November 4, 2023 (aged 42) Oxford, Mississippi, U.S.
- Listed height: 6 ft 8 in (2.03 m)
- Listed weight: 207 lb (94 kg)

Career information
- High school: Provine (Jackson, Mississippi)
- College: Ole Miss (2000–2004)
- NBA draft: 2004: undrafted
- Playing career: 2005–2020
- Position: Shooting guard / small forward

Career history
- 2005: KR
- 2005: Panteras de Miranda
- 2005–2007: Chorale Roanne
- 2007: Azovmash Mariupol
- 2008: Trotamundos
- 2008–2009: Chorale Roanne
- 2009–2012: Levski Sofia
- 2012–2013: Sagesse
- 2013: Élan Béarnais Pau-Orthez
- 2014–2015: Marinos
- 2015–2016: Al Riyadi Beirut
- 2016–2017: Quimsa
- 2017–2018: Ferro Carril Oeste
- 2019: Guaros de Lara
- 2019–2020: Huracanes de Tampico
- 2020: Capitanes de Arecibo

Career highlights
- Bulgarian Cup winner (2010); Balkan League champion (2010); Bulgarian League All-Star Game MVP (2011); Pro A champion (2007); 2× Pro A All-Star (2006, 2007); Semaine des As winner (2007); LPB Most Valuable Player (2005); LPB All-Star (2005)

Aaron SinQ'ue Harper (March 12, 1981 – November 4, 2023) was an American professional basketball player. He usually played as swingman, playing on both shooting guard and small forward positions. He was a graduate of the Ole Miss basketball program.

== College career ==
Harper played college basketball for Ole Miss from 2000 to 2004. In his senior year he was the school's leading scorer with 16.5 points.

== Professional career ==
Harper signed with Úrvalsdeild karla club KR at the end of December 2004, playing his first games in January 2005. After a difficult first half of the season for KR, Harper's arrival changed the team's fortunes for the better, helping them win 7 of their last 11 games and making the playoffs. In the playoffs, the faced Snæfell in the first round. In the first game of the series, Harper helped KR rally from a 14-point deficit and scored the go-ahead three-pointer with seven seconds left, securing KR's 91–89 victory. Snæfell tied the series in the next game and in the third and deciding game of the series, Snæfell pulled away for a 116–105 victory despite Harper's 35 points.

In March 2005, Harper signed with Panteras de Miranda. He was selected to appear in the 2005 Liga Profesional de Baloncesto (LPB) All-Star Game. Harper led the league in scoring with 24.1 points per game and was selected as the LBP Most Valuable Player. He played two seasons with Chorale Roanne from 2005 to 2007 where he won both the Semaine des As and LNB Pro A championships in 2007 and was a two-time All-Star selection. Harper joined Azovmash Mariupol for the start of the 2007–08 season and then moved to Trotamundos in February 2008. He returned to Chorale Roanne for the 2008–09 season.

== Death ==
Harper was killed in a car accident in Oxford, Mississippi, on November 4, 2023, aged 42. He was driving on U.S. Route 278 when his car left the roadway and rolled several times.
