= Venezuelan SuperLiga MVP =

The Venezuelan SuperLiga MVP, previously the Liga Profesional de Baloncesto (LPB) MVP is an annual award that is handed out to the most valuable player of a given season of the LPB season, the highest professional basketball league in Venezuela.

== Winners ==
Season	Player	Pos.	Team	Ref
1974	(United States) Robert Lewis	F	Colosos de Carabobo	
1975	(United States) James Roundtree	C	Panteras del Táchira	
1976	(Venezuela) Ramón Rivero	C	Panteras del Táchira	
1977	(Venezuela) Cruz Lairet	F	Guaiqueríes de Margarita	
1978	(United States) Roscoe Pondexter	F	Colosos de Carabobo	
1979	(United States) Tim Billingslea	F	Banqueros de Aragua	
1980	(United States) Gerald Cunningham	F	Guaiqueríes de Margarita	
1981	(United States) Lewis Linder	G	Guaiqueríes de Margarita	
1982	(United States) Chris Lockhart	F	Taurinos de Aragua	
1983	(United States) Sam Shepherd	G	Panteras de Lara	
1984	(United States) Michael Hackett	F/C	Guaiqueríes de Margarita	
1985	(United States) Michael Britt	F	Gaiteros del Zulia	
1986	(United States) Joe Dawson	F	Cocodrilos de Caracas	
1987	(United States) Al Smith	F	Trotamundos de Carabobo	
1988	(United States) Al Smith (2)	F	Trotamundos de Carabobo	
1989	(United States) Al Smith (3)	F	Trotamundos de Carabobo	
1990	(Venezuela) Carl Herrera	F	Cardenales de Portuguesa	
1991	(United States) Charlie Bradley	F	Marinos de Anzoátegui	
1992	(United States) Antoine Joubert	G	Panteras de Miranda	
1993	(United States) David Wesley	G	Trotamundos de Carabobo	
1994	(United States) Stanley Brundy	F	Trotamundos de Carabobo	
1995	(United States) Andrew Moten	G	Marinos de Anzoátegui	
1996	(United States) Harold Keeling	G	Toros de Aragua	
1997	(Venezuela) Víctor Díaz	F	Panteras de Miranda	
1998	(United States) Leon Trimmingham	F	Marinos de Anzoátegui	
1999	(United States) Askia Jones	G	Guaiqueríes de Margarita	
2000	(United States) Ruben Nembhard	G	Gaiteros del Zulia	
2001	(Venezuela) Víctor Díaz (2)	F	Panteras de Miranda	
2002	(Venezuela) Richard Lugo	C	Panteras de Miranda	
2003	(United States) Ruben Nembhard (2)	G	Gaiteros del Zulia	
2004	(Venezuela) Víctor Díaz (3)	F	Panteras de Miranda	
2005	(United States) Aaron Harper	G	Gaiteros del Zulia	
2006	(United States) Ruben Nembhard (3)	G	Gaiteros del Zulia	
2007	(United States) Tang Hamilton	F	Guaros de Lara	
2008	(Venezuela) Hernán Salcedo	F	Gaiteros del Zulia	
2009	(United States) Torraye Braggs	F	Guaros de Lara	
2010	(United States) Ruben Nembhard (4)	G	Gaiteros del Zulia	
2011	(Venezuela) Heissler Guillent	G	Bucaneros de La Guaira	
2012	(United States) Carl Elliott	G	Cocodrilos de Caracas	
2013	(Dominican Republic) Edward Santana	F	Gaiteros del Zulia	
2014	(United States) Aaron Harper (2)	G	Marinos de Anzoátegui	
2015	(United States) Carl Elliott (2)	G	Cocodrilos de Caracas	
2016	(Venezuela) Axiers Sucre	F	Gigantes de Guayana	
2017	(United States) Carlos Powell	F	Trotamundos de Carabobo	
2018	(United States) Trey Gilder	F	Panteras de Miranda	
2021 (I)	(Venezuela) Gregory Vargas	G	Cocodrilos de Caracas	
2021 (II)	(Venezuela) Windi Graterol	F/C	Spartans Distrito Capital	
2022	(Venezuela) Garly Sojo	G/F	Broncos de Caracas	
2023	(Venezuela) Heissler Guillent (2)	PG	Guaros de Lara	
2024	(Dominican Republic) Luis Montero	SG	Cocodrilos de Caracas	
2025	(Venezuela) Luis Duarte	G	Gaiteros del Zulia	

== Winners by team ==
Team	Winners
Gaiteros del Zulia	9
Panteras de Miranda	6
Trotamundos de Carabobo	6
Guaiqueríes de Margarita	5
Cocodrilos de Caracas	5
Marinos de Anzoátegui	4
Guaros de Lara	4
Toros de Aragua	3
Colosos de Carabobo	2
Panteras del Táchira	2
Cardenales de Portuguesa	1
Gigantes de Guayana	1
Panteras de Lara	1
Spartans Distrito Capital	1
Broncos de Caracas	1
