= Elmer Yanga =

Filipino basketball executive (1945–2024)

Commissioner of the University Athletic Association of the Philippines Basketball
- In office 2006–2007
- Preceded by: Joe Lipa
- Succeeded by: Ed Cordero
- Basketball career

Personal information
- Born: August 13, 1945
- Died: May 1, 2024 (aged 78)

Career information
- College: UE

Career highlights
- As executive: 4x PBA champion (1992 Third Conference, 1993 Commissioner's, 1995 All-Filipino 1995 Commissioner's); 2x PBA Executive of the Year (1993–1995)

Elmer Yanga (August 13, 1945 – May 1, 2024) is a Filipino sports executive serving for Pop Cola Panthers from its foundation in 1990 until its disbandment in 2001.

== Career ==
An alumnus of University of the East, Yanga started as the manager of the RFM–Swift coached by Yeng Guiao in the PABL. In Pop Cola PBA franchise, he helped the team to win 4 championships. He also won 3 Danny Floro PBA Executive of the Year award from 1993 to 1995 for turning the franchise into title contender. He is also notable for letting Yeng Guiao go to Pepsi/Mobiline and hiring Derrick Pumaren in 1994 Governors' Cup. The said happening was rumored to be a "coaching trade" between Pop Cola/RFM franchise and Pepsi/Mobiline.

In an interview, he stated that he coached the Pop Cola franchise for one time, but he did not remembered when the game is. Yanga coached the team as Swift, in the 1994 PBA Commissioner's Cup, in an exhibition game against the Philippine national team where Swift won. At this time, Yeng Guiao had resigned as head coach, and Derrick Pumaren was still not released by Pepsi.

He also served as the manager of Sunkist-UST squad in the PBL, and also served as Senior Vice President for corporate communications of RFM Corporation until 2004, when he retired. In 2006, Yanga was named as commissioner of the UAAP Season 69 basketball tournaments.

== Death ==
Yanga died in May 1, 2024 at age 78.
