= Danny Floro PBA Executive of the Year award =

PBA award for team executives

The Danny Floro Philippine Basketball Association (PBA) Executive of the Year award is an annual Philippine Basketball Association (PBA) award given since the 1993 PBA season. The winner receives the Danny Floro Trophy, which is named since 1995 in honor of Valeriano "Danny" Floro, who owns the Crispa Redmanizers, one of the original members of the PBA which won two Grand Slam in 1976 and 1983. Unlike the traditional player awards, which is given by the league, this citation is awarded by the PBA Press Corps.

Since its inception, the award has been given to 17 individuals and one group. TNT Tropang 5G team owner Manny Pangilinan will be receiving his third Executive of the Year award from the PBA Press Corps (PBAPC).

== List of awardees ==
^	Denotes executive who is still active in the PBA
*	Elected to the PBA Hall of Fame as an executive
*^	Active PBA executive who has been elected to the PBA Hall of Fame

Season	Executive	Country of birth	Team
1993	Elmer Yanga	Philippines	Swift Mighty Meaties
1994	Elmer Yanga (2)	Philippines	Swift Mighty Meaties
1995	Elmer Yanga (3)	Philippines	Sunkist Orange Juicers
1996	Jun Bernardino*	Philippines	n/a
1997	Simon Mossesgeld	Philippines	Purefoods Carne Norte Beefies
1998	Wilfred Uytengsu	Philippines	Alaska Milkmen
1999	Jun Bernardino* (2)	Philippines	n/a (League Commissioner)
2000	Buddy Encarnado	Philippines	Sta. Lucia Realtors
2001	Sonny Barrios	Philippines	n/a
2002	George Chua	Philippines	Red Bull Thunder
2003	Manny Pangilinan^	Philippines	Talk 'N Text Phone Pals
2004–05	Henry Cojuangco	Philippines	Barangay Ginebra Kings
2005–06	Rene Pardo^	Philippines	Purefoods Chunkee Giants
2006–07	Ricky Vargas^	Philippines	Talk 'N Text Phone Pals
2007–08	Buddy Encarnado (2)	Philippines	Sta. Lucia Realtors
2008–09	Danding Cojuangco*	Philippines	San Miguel Beermen
2009–10	Wilfred Uytengsu (2)	Philippines	Alaska Aces
2010–11	Manny Pangilinan^ (2)	Philippines	Talk 'N Text Tropang Texters
2011–12	Raymond Yu^	Philippines	Rain or Shine Elasto Painters
2011–12	Terry Que^	Philippines	Rain or Shine Elasto Painters
2012–13	Team PBA^{1}	Philippines	n/a
2013–14	Ramon Ang^	Philippines	San Miguel Corporation teams
2014–15	Patrick Gregorio^	Philippines	Talk 'N Text Tropang Texters
2015–16	Raymond Yu^ (2)	Philippines	Rain or Shine Elasto Painters
2015–16	Terry Que^ (2)	Philippines	Rain or Shine Elasto Painters
2016–17	Ramon Ang^ (2)	Philippines	San Miguel Corporation teams
2017–18	Alfrancis Chua^	Philippines	Barangay Ginebra San Miguel
2019	Ricky Vargas^ (2)	Philippines	TNT KaTropa
2020 (Note: The 2020 season only had one conference. A different award, named "Mr. Executive" was given to Marcial.)	Willie Marcial^	Philippines	n/a
2021	Alfrancis Chua^ (2)	Philippines	Barangay Ginebra San Miguel
2022–23	Jojo Lastimosa^	Philippines	TNT Tropang Giga
2023–24	Alfrancis Chua^ (3)	Philippines	Barangay Ginebra San Miguel
2024–25	Manny Pangilinan^ (3)	Philippines	TNT Tropang 5G

== Multiple time winners ==
Total	Player
3	Alfrancis Chua
3	Manny Pangilinan
3	Elmer Yanga
2	Ramon Ang
2	Jun Bernardino
2	Buddy Encarnado
2	Terry Que
2	Wilfred Uytengsu
2	Ricky Vargas
2	Raymond Yu
