= 1995–96 Philippine Basketball League season =

1995–96 PBL season
- Duration: March 4, 1995 – January 9, 1996
- Teams: 9
- TV partner: Silverstar Sports (PTV)
- Season MVP: Marlou Aquino; Marlou Aquino; Marlou Aquino
- Reinforced Conference champions: Stag Pale Pilseners
- Reinforced Conference runners-up: Red Bull Energy Drink
- All-Filipino Cup champions: Stag Pale Pilseners
- All-Filipino Cup runners-up: Casino Rubbing Alcohol
- Danny Floro Cup champions: Stag Pale Pilseners
- Danny Floro Cup runners-up: Red Bull Energy Drink

Seasons
- 1994 1996

The 1995–96 season of the Philippine Basketball League (PBL).

== Notable achievements ==
Under coach Junel Baculi, the PBL-Andoks team won the Asian Interclub basketball championships in Kuala Lumpur, defeating Malaysia-Petronas, 101–82, in the finals. The PBL selection were reinforced by seven-time PBA best import Bobby Parks and former Ginebra import Alexander Coles.

The Stag Pale Pilseners completed a three-conference sweep and a grandslam in their very first season in the PBL. The Pilseners of coach Alfrancis Chua, with the likes of MVP Marlou Aquino, Bal David, Reuben Dela Rosa, Randy Alcantara, Derrick Bughao, Paul Du and best import Antoine Joubert, became the third team to win a title in their first try during the Reinforced Conference, defeating Red Bull Energy Drink in four games. Stag had an easier time scoring a three-game finals sweep in the next two conferences, winning over Casino Rubbing Alcohol in the All-Filipino Cup and repeating over Red Bull in the Danny Floro Cup in January 1996.

== Occurrences ==
The PBL took a two-week break during the month of June to give way to the ABC Championships where most of the top players are members of the national team, the league resume on June 29 with the best-of-three semifinal pairings in the short All-Filipino Cup.

== Reinforced Conference ==
Qualified for semifinals

Team standings	Win	Loss	PCT
Stag Pale Pilsen	14	2	.875
Red Bull Energy Drink	13	3	.812
Chowking Fastfood Kings	9	7	.562
Kutitap Toothpaste	8	8	.500
Casino Rubbing Alcohol	8	8	.500
Magnolia Cheezee Spread	7	9	.438
Burger Machine	6	10	.375
Ramcar Oriental Battery	4	12	.250
Carol Ann's Snack Masters	3	13	.188

The imports who saw action in this conference were Antoine Joubert (Stag), Ray Reed (Red Bull), who was replaced by Stevie Thompson, Glynn Blackwell (Chowking), Claude Moore (Casino), Gary Gaspard (Kutitap), David Barksdale (Magnolia), Tony Tolbert (Burger Machine), Steve Hall (Ramcar), and Mark Harris (Carol Ann's).

Stag and Red Bull played in the finals, the Pale Pilseners finish the semifinal round with 19 wins and 4 losses, followed by Red Bull with a 16 wins and 7 losses. Chowking and Casino gained a playoff for the second finals slot via win 4-of-7 incentive scheme. Casino won against Chowking, 92–73, but the Alcohol Makers in turn, lost to Red Bull on the following day for the right to meet the Pilseners for the championship.

=== Finals series ===
Team	Game 1 (May 1)	Game 2 (May 4)	Game 3 (May 6)	Game 4 (May 10)	Wins
Stag	130	100	104	110	3
Red Bull	110	101	87	96	1
Venue	RMC	RMC	RMC	RMC

== All-Filipino Cup ==
Qualified for semifinals

Quarterfinal standings	Win	Loss	PCT
Stag Pale Pilsen	4	1	.800
Oriental Battery	3	2	.600
Casino Rubbing Alcohol	3	2	.600
Kutitap Toothpaste	3	2	.600
Magnolia Cheezee Spread	1	4	.200
Chowking	1	4	.200

Three teams; Red Bull, Burger Machine and Carol Ann's were eliminated after a one-round eliminations. In the best-of-three semifinals match-up, Stag prevailed over Kutitap and Casino won over Oriental Battery to arrange a finals showdown.

=== Finals series ===
Team	Game 1 (July 3)	Game 2 (July 6)	Game 3 (July 8)	Wins
Stag	71	74	83	3
Casino	61	64	79	0
Venue	RMC	RMC	RMC

== 1995-96 Danny Floro Cup ==
Qualified for semifinals

Quarterfinal standings	Win	Loss	PCT
Red Bull	4	1	.800
Stag Pale Pilsen	3	2	.600
Casino Rubbing Alcohol	3	2	.600
Kutitap Toothpaste	3	2	.600
Burger Machine	2	3	.400
Chowking	0	5	.000

Six teams makes it to the quarterfinals after the eliminations. Stag scored a 2–0 sweep over Casino in their best-of-three semifinal series. Red Bull also swept their own series against Kutitap and sealed a finals rematch with the Pale Pilseners.

=== Finals series ===
Team	Game 1 (Jan.7)	Game 2 (Jan.8)	Game 3 (Jan.9)	Wins
Stag	105	93	102	3
Red Bull	102	86	92	0
Venue	RMC	RMC	RMC

== International Invitational Cup ==
The short international invitational tournament took place from December 9–17, 1995. Guest teams were Boysen-International Bank of Korea, Hapee-Ozeta Club of the Slovak Republic and the Budweiser Kings of Guam. Casino Rubbing Alcohol and Ozeta Club were declared co-champions after their final game ended at 97-all. The PBL was forced to let the Slovak squad leave early to catch their flight. The Danny Floro Cup resumes just before Christmas.

== Individual awards ==
- All-Filipino Cup:
- Most Valuable Player: Marlou Aquino (Stag)
- Mythical First team:
- Marlou Aquino (Stag)
- Bal David (Stag)
- Reuben Dela Rosa (Stag)
- Gilbert Castillo (Casino)
- Rodney Santos (Oriental Battery)
- Mythical Second team:
- James Walkvist (Oriental Battery)
- Michael Orquillas (Oriental Battery)
- Arthur Ayson (Oriental Battery)
- Randy Alcantara (Stag)
- Ruel Bravo (Kutitap)
