= 1996 Philippine Basketball League season =

1996 PBL season
- Duration: March 16 - December 14, 1996
- Teams: 8
- TV partner: Silverstar Sports (PTV)
- Season MVP: Jason Webb; Bong Marata; Genesis Sasuman
- Import Reinforced champions: Hapee Toothpaste
- Import Reinforced runners-up: Stag Pale Pilseners
- All-Filipino Cup champions: Agfa HDC Films
- All-Filipino Cup runners-up: Stag Pale Pilseners
- Danny Floro Cup champions: Stag Pale Pilseners
- Danny Floro Cup runners-up: Springmaid Flak Eliminators

Seasons
- 1995-96 1997-98

The 1996 season of the Philippine Basketball League (PBL).

== Notable achievements ==
First Conference champion Hapee Toothpaste represent the Philippine team in the ABC Champions Cup slated June 2–9 at the Ninoy Aquino Stadium. The Philippines-Hapee, coached by Junel Baculi and reinforced by ex-PBA imports Tony Harris and Bobby Parks, along with Hapee mainstays Joel Dualan, Erwin Framo, Oscar Simon, Ramon Pido and borrowed players from Red Bull, Danny Ildefonso and Henry Fernandez, won the title by defeating Isuzu lynx of Japan, 77-74, in the finale.

Agfa Colors, which won the All-Filipino Cup, represent the country to the Jones Cup in Taipei and place 6th in the tournament.

== Participating teams ==
- Hapee Toothpaste (became known as Dazz Dishwashing Paste starting the Danny Floro Cup)
- Stag Pale Pilseners
- Chowking Fastfood Kings
- Oriental Battery (known as Super Power Battery starting the All-Filipino Cup)
- Red Bull Energy Drink (switch back to Agfa, known as Agfa HDC Film starting the All-Filipino Cup)
- Casino Rubbing Alcohol (played only in the Reinforced Conference)
- Carol Ann's Food Delights (played only in the Reinforced Conference)
- Burger Machine (left the league before the Danny Floro Cup)
- Welcoat Paints (new team starting the All-Filipino Cup)
- AMA Cybertigers (new team in the Danny Floro Cup)
- Springmaid Flak Eliminators (new team in the Danny Floro Cup)

== Reinforced Conference ==
Qualified for semifinals

Team standings	Win	Loss	PCT
Hapee Toothpaste	11	3	.785
Stag Pale Pilsen	8	6	.571
Chowking	8	6	.571
Red Bull	8	6	.571
Burger Machine	7	7	.500
Casino Rubbing Alcohol	6	8	.429
Carol Ann's	5	9	.357
Oriental Battery	2	12	.142

The respective teams' imports are Ma Jian of Hapee Toothpaste, Lucious Jackson of Burger Machine, Fred Vinsons of Carol Ann's, Claude Moore of Casino Rubbing Alcohol, David Vanterpool of Chowking Fastfood, Steve Worthy of defending champion Stag Pale Pilsen, who was replaced by Robert Phelps, Kevin Ardister of Red Bull, replaced by Jerry Stroman, and for Oriental Battery, Darnell Sneed, replaced by Eric Jones, who in turn, was replaced by former PBA import and Ginebra reinforcement Alexander Coles.

Hapee Toothpaste and Stag Pale Pilsen went on to play in the best-of-five championship series after the one round, six-team semifinals.

=== Finals series ===
May 2

recap

Hapee Toothpaste 83, Stag Pale Pilseners 76

Rizal Memorial Coliseum, Manila

May 4

recap

Hapee Toothpaste 102, Stag Pale Pilseners 104 (OT)

Rizal Memorial Coliseum, Manila

May 6

recap

Hapee Toothpaste 90, Stag Pale Pilseners 79

Rizal Memorial Coliseum, Manila

May 8

Hapee Toothpaste 83, Stag Pale Pilseners 77
Hapee wins series, 3-1

Rizal Memorial Coliseum, Manila

The Cavity Fighters ended a three-year wait for the title and claim their first-ever PBL crown, defeating the defending champion Stag Pale Pilseners, which won the Grandslam earlier in the year in a cinderella fashion, in four games. Chinese import Ma Jian led Hapee with 22 points and 8 rebounds as the Cavity Fighters gained the right to represent the country minus the 6-7 Ma Jian in the upcoming Asian Basketball Confederation (ABC) Champions Cup.

== All-Filipino Cup ==
Qualified for semifinals

Team standings	Win	Loss	PCT
Stag Pale Pilsen	10	2	.833
Agfa HDC Films	9	3	.750
Super Power Battery	8	4	.667
Burger Machine	7	5	.583
Hapee Toothpaste	3	9	.250
Chowking	3	9	.250
Welcoat Paints	2	10	.167

Newcomer Welcoat Paints debut with an upset 79-70 win over Hapee Toothpaste, who just won another championship in the ABC Champions Cup. After the two round eliminations, four teams makes it to the round-robin semifinals. Leaders Stag Pale Pilsen and Agfa HDC Films made it to the best-of-three finals series.

=== Finals series ===
July 10

recap

Agfa HDC Film 82, Stag Pale Pilseners 94

Ninoy Aquino Stadium, Manila

July 11

recap

Agfa HDC Film 108, Stag Pale Pilseners 91

Ninoy Aquino Stadium, Manila

July 12

Agfa HDC Film 71, Stag Pale Pilseners 66
Agfa wins series, 2-1

Ninoy Aquino Stadium, Manila

Agfa pulled off a 71-66 win over Stag in Game 3 of their best-of-three title series for their first PBL crown since joining the league three years ago. Danny Ildefonso and Anastacio Mendoza led the Film Experts of winning coach Jimmy Mariano with 14 points apiece while Henry Fernandez added 12 markers.

== Danny Floro Cup ==
Qualified for finals

#	Semifinal standings	Cumulative				SF	
#	Semifinal standings	W	L	PCT	GB	W	L
1	Springmaid	10	5	.667	–-	2	3
2	Stag Pale Pilsen	10	5	.667	--	4	1
3	Agfa HDC Film	9	6	.600	1	3	2
4	Chowking	9	6	.600	1	3	2
5	Dazz Dishwashing Paste	7	8	.500	3	2	3
6	Super Power Battery	5	10	.333	5	1	4

Newcomer Springmaid Flak Eliminators, coach by Cholo Martin, top the eliminations with an 8-2 won-loss card, however, they lost three of their four games in the one-round semifinals and were in danger of figuring in a three-team playoff for the second finals berth. Springmaid sealed a finals showdown with defending champion Stag Pale Pilsen, following a 69-58 win over the Pilseners on last semifinals playing date on December 4.

=== Finals series ===
December 7

recap

Stag Pale Pilseners 78, Springmaid 70

Rizal Memorial Coliseum, Manila

December 9

recap

Stag Pale Pilseners 92, Springmaid 81

Rizal Memorial Coliseum, Manila

December 11

recap

Stag Pale Pilseners 68, Springmaid 76

Rizal Memorial Coliseum, Manila

December 14

Stag Pale Pilseners 82, Springmaid 70
Stag wins series, 3-1

Rizal Memorial Coliseum, Manila

The Stag Pale Pilseners retain the only title left from their triple-crown last season, winning their finals series against Springmaid, 3 games to 1, the Pilseners finish off Springmaid with an 82-70 win in Game 4. Mark Telan led the Pilseners with 21 points while Jomer Rubi banged in 19 points and Christopher Cantonjos provided 15.

== Individual awards ==
- Reinforced Conference:
- Most Valuable Player: Jason Webb (Stag)
- Mythical First Team
- Jason Webb (Stag)
- Genesis Sasuman (Chowking)
- Mark Telan (Stag)
- Henry Fernandez (Red Bull)
- Oscar Simon (Hapee)
- Mythical Second Team
- Danny Ildefonso (Red Bull)
- Braulio Lim (Red Bull)
- Anastacio Mendoza (Red Bull)
- Paul Du (Stag)
- Leo Austria (Hapee)
