= 1994 Philippine Basketball League season =

1994 PBL season
- Duration: February 13 – December 19, 1994
- Teams: 8
- TV partner: IBC
- Season MVP: Jeffrey Cariaso; Marlou Aquino; Dennis Espino
- International Invitational Cup champions: Casino Rubbing Alcohol
- International Invitational Cup runners-up: Nikon Electric Fan
- Reinforced Conference champions: Otto Shoes
- Reinforced Conference runners-up: Burger Machine
- Invitational Cup champions: Instafood
- Invitational Cup runners-up: Otto Shoes

Seasons
- ← 1993 1995-96 →

The 1994 season of the Philippine Basketball League (PBL).

== Occurrences ==
- PBL Commissioner Philip Juico slapped a one-year ban on Instafood coach Francis Rodriguez for his violent outburst on American referee Butch Mattias, Juico later lifted the penalty on coach Rodriguez upon the advised of the PBL board.
- Former Shell team manager Charlie Favis accepted the position as the new PBL commissioner starting the Reinforced Conference.
- Nikon Electric Fan left the league before the Third Conference and in their place was the new team Kutitap Cavity Fighters.

== International Invitational Cup ==
Qualified for semifinals

#	Team Standings	W	L	PCT	GB
1	Instafood Mealmasters	12	2	.857	--
2	Burger Machine	9	5	.643	3
3	Otto Shoes	9	5	.643	3
4	Casino Rubbing Alcohol	8	6	.571	4
5	Nikon Electric Fan	7	7	.500	5
6	Rica Hotdogs	5	9	.357	7
7	Chowking Fastfood Kings	4	10	.285	8
8	Red Bull Energy Drink	2	12	.214	10

Guest teams seeded in the semifinal round were the Fil-Am California-Cebuana Lhuillier and China-Yakult. After the one-round semifinals, Casino Rubbing Alcohol swept all their seven assignments for a perfect 7-0 card, Nikon clinch the second finals berth with a 5-2 won-loss record, three other teams; Otto Shoes, Instafood and Cebuana-Lhuillier were tied at 4-3, Burger Machine at 2-5, China-Yakult and Rica Hotdogs were at the bottom with 1-6.

=== Finals series ===
Team	Game 1 (March 21)	Game 2 (March 23)	Game 3 (March 24)	Game 4 (March 26)	Wins
Casino	67	62	77	75	3
Nikon	57	65	70	69	1
Venue	Cuneta	Cuneta	Cuneta	Cuneta

Casino Rubbing Alcohol won their first championship after eight years of long search for the elusive crown since taking the reins of Cebu-based Mama's Love franchise. Coach Willie Generalao won his first title as a head mentor. The Alcohol Makers unleashed a 9-0 run in the first seven minutes of the fourth quarter of the title-clinching Game Four of the finals series against Nikon Electric Fan. Edward Joseph Feihl scored four straight points and Casino got five more points from Rudolf Belmonte, Gilbert Castillo and Dindo Pastor to shove ahead, 66-57, with three minutes to go. The conference Most Valuable Player Jeffrey Cariaso paced Nikon with 22 points.

== Reinforced Conference ==
Qualified for finals

#	Semifinal Standings	W	L	PCT	GB
1	Otto Shoes	17	4	.810	--
2	Burger Machine	15	6	.714	2
3	Red Bull Energy Drink	11	10	.523	6
4	Instafood Mealmasters	10	11	.477	7
5	Nikon Electric Fan	9	13	.410	8

^{Note: The last playing date of a semifinal double-header on June 22 was no longer played to give the two finalists more time to prepare}

The Import-flavored Reinforced Conference opens on April 30. The respective teams imports were Alan Ogg of Carol Ann's (formerly Rica Hotdogs), Derek Brower of Chowking, Randy Henry of Red Bull, Mick Kilgore of Burger Machine, Keith Hughes of Instafood, who was replaced by Dietrich Waters, Casino's Hammie Ward, Otto Shoes' Steve Wills and Patrick Eddie of Nikon.

=== Finals series ===
Team	Game 1 (June 25)	Game 2 (June 27)	Game 3 (June 29)	Game 4 (July 2)	Wins
Otto Shoes	68	96	85	95	3
Burger Machine	66	93	95	81	1
Venue	Cuneta	Cuneta	Cuneta	Cuneta

Otto Shoes, which top the eliminations at 12-2 and the semifinals, ended a two-year title-drought with a 3-1 series win over Burger Machine. The Shoe Makers were still known as Sta.Lucia when they last won a championship back in 1992. The conference Most Valuable Player Marlou Aquino, finish with 20 points while Jun Jabar added 15 and import Steve Wills contributed 14 points for Otto. Burger's Mick Kilgore had 35 points, hotshot Kenneth Duremdes and Michael Mustre added 14 points apiece for the Burger Specialists.

== Invitational Cup ==
Qualified for semifinals

#	Team Standings	W	L	PCT	GB
1	Instafood Mealmasters	7	3	.700	--
2	Burger Machine	7	3	.700	--
3	Otto Shoes	7	3	.700	--
4	Casino Rubbing Alcohol	7	3	.700	--
5	Chowking Fastfood Kings	6	4	.600	1
6	Red Bull Energy Drink	3	7	.300	4
7	Kutitap Cavity Fighters	2	8	.200	5
8	Carol Ann's	1	9	.100	6

During the International Invitational Cup semifinals, two foreign teams; Los Angeles PRO stars and Belgrade Radnicki-CIP were supposed to arrive as guest teams but didn't come. The PBL board was thinking of just naming the tournament "PBL Cup" until a Beijing selection, a national men's club champion to be sponsored by Crispa here, confirm their participation only in the first round of the semifinals, the Crispa-Chinese selection perform poorly in their short stint.

Instafood was declared "Champions" in the International Invitational Cup after topping the first round of the semifinals, the word "International" was dropped after and teams battled it out for the year-end Invitational championship.

=== Finals series ===
Team	Game 1 (Dec.14)	Game 2 (Dec.15)	Game 3 (Dec.17)	Game 4 (Dec.19)	Wins
Instafood	79	77	69	76	3
Otto Shoes	73	82	60	72	1
Venue	Cuneta	Blue Eagle	Cuneta	Cuneta

Instafood defeated Otto, 76-72, in Game four of their finals series for a 3-1 victory. The Mealmasters likewise ended a four-year title-drought since they last won under the name of Magnolia Ice Cream in 1990. Instafood coach Francis Rodriguez' last title was also in 1990 with Sta.Lucia Realtors - the franchise Otto Shoes bought.
