= Stag Pale Pilseners =

Defunct semi-professional basketball team founded by Bong Tan

- Leagues: Philippine Basketball League
- Founded: 1995
- Folded: 1999
- History: Stag Pale Pilseners; 1995-1996; Tanduay Gold Rhum; 1997-1999
- Location: Philippines
- Team colors: Blue, white, red
- President: Lucio K. Tan, Jr.
- Head coach: Alfrancis Chua
- Championships: PBL (4): *1995 Reinforced Conference; *1995 All-Filipino Cup; *1995-96 Danny Floro Cup; *1996 Danny Floro Cup

Tanduay Gold Rhum
- Leagues: Philippine Basketball League
- Founded: 1995
- Folded: 1999
- History: Stag Pale Pilseners; 1995-1996; Tanduay Gold Rhum; 1997-1999
- Location: Philippines
- Team colors: Red, gold, white
- President: Lucio K. Tan, Jr.
- Head coach: Alfrancis Chua
- Championships: PBL (3): *1997 Makati Mayor's Cup; *1997-98 All-Filipino Cup; *1998 First Centennial Cup

The Stag Pale Pilseners were a Philippine Basketball League (PBL) team owned by Asia Brewery, Inc., a company owned by the Lucio Tan group. It joined the league in 1995. The team was renamed Tanduay Gold Rhum Masters in 1997 and remained with the league until 1999. The franchise was the most dominant team during its PBL stint, playing in the finals in all 10 participated conferences, winning seven championships, including a grand slam finish in its debut year (1995) and four consecutive titles from 1996 to 1998.

The franchise transferred to the Philippine Basketball Association in 1999, becoming the second incarnation of Tanduay in the PBA. The Lucio Tan group would return to the Philippine Basketball League in 2009 when it took over the Bacchus Energy Drink Raiders/Warriors and renamed the team as the Cobra Energy Drink Iron Men.

== Roster ==
=== 1995 season ===
Stag Pale Pilseners roster
Players
Coaches

Pos.	No.	Nat.	Name	Ht.	Wt.
G		(Philippines)	Randy Alcantara	6 ft 0 in (1.83 m)
C		(Philippines)	Marlou Aquino	6 ft 9 in (2.06 m)
G		(Philippines)	Derrick Bughao	5 ft 9 in (1.75 m)
G		(Philippines)	Bal David	5 ft 9 in (1.75 m)
F		(Philippines)	Reuben Dela Rosa	6 ft 1 in (1.85 m)
F		(Philippines)	Paul Du	6 ft 3 in (1.91 m)
F		(Philippines)	Jorge Gallent	6 ft 2 in (1.88 m)
F		(Philippines)	Leody Garcia	6 ft 2 in (1.88 m)
C		(Philippines)	Leo Macadangdang	6 ft 4 in (1.93 m)
G		(Philippines)	Thirdy Mariazeta	5 ft 7 in (1.70 m)
C		(Philippines)	Mark Telan	6 ft 6 in (1.98 m)
G		(Philippines)	Olegario Topacio	5 ft 10 in (1.78 m)
F		(Philippines)	John Velasco	6 ft 2 in (1.88 m)
G		(Philippines)	Chito Victolero	5 ft 8 in (1.73 m)
G		(Philippines)	Jason Webb	6 ft 1 in (1.85 m)

Head coach

- (Philippines) Alfrancis Chua

Assistant coach(es)

Legend

- (C) Team captain
- (CI) Commissioner's Cup Import
- (GI) Governors' Cup Import
- (EI) EASL Import
- (DP) Unsigned draft pick
- (FA) Free agent
- (IN) Inactive
- (S) Suspended
- (R) Rookie
- Injured

=== 1997-1998 season ===
Tanduay Gold Rhum Masters roster
Players
Coaches

Pos.	No.	Nat.	Name	Ht.	Wt.
G		(Philippines)	Randy Alcantara	6 ft 0 in (1.83 m)
G		(Philippines)	Derrick Bughao	5 ft 9 in (1.75 m)
C		(Philippines)	Chris Cantonjos	6 ft 6 in (1.98 m)
G		(Philippines)	Rommel Daep	6 ft 2 in (1.88 m)
F		(Philippines)	Jorge Gallent	6 ft 2 in (1.88 m)
F		(Philippines)	Bobby Jose	6 ft 3 in (1.91 m)
C		(Philippines)	Erwin Luna	6 ft 7 in (2.01 m)
G		(Philippines)	Alvin Magpantay	6 ft 0 in (1.83 m)
C		(United States)	Eric Menk	6 ft 6 in (1.98 m)
G		(Philippines)	Aldrin Morante	6 ft 0 in (1.83 m)
G		(Philippines)	Jomer Rubi	5 ft 8 in (1.73 m)
F		(Philippines)	Mark Telan	6 ft 7 in (2.01 m)
F		(Philippines)	John Velasco	6 ft 2 in (1.88 m)

Head coach

- (Philippines) Alfrancis Chua

Assistant coach(es)

Legend

- (C) Team captain
- (CI) Commissioner's Cup Import
- (GI) Governors' Cup Import
- (EI) EASL Import
- (DP) Unsigned draft pick
- (FA) Free agent
- (IN) Inactive
- (S) Suspended
- (R) Rookie
- Injured

== See also ==
- Tanduay Rhum Masters
- Cobra Energy Drink Iron Men
- Manila Beer Brewmasters
