= American University of Puerto Rico =

Private university in Puerto Rico

- Type: Private
- Active: 1963–2023
- Affiliations: CHEPR, MSA
- Faculty: 221
- Students: 2934
- Location: Bayamón, Puerto Rico; 18.406429°N 66.186506°W
- Campus: Urban
- Website: www.aupr.edu

The American University of Puerto Rico (AUPR) was a private university in Puerto Rico with campuses in Bayamón and Manatí. The university was founded in 1963 as the American Business College and offered undergraduate studies in arts, business administration, education, and sciences, and graduate studies in criminal justice.

AUPR was accredited by the Council of Higher Education of Puerto Rico and the Middle States Association of Colleges and Schools.

Its founder, Juan B. Nazario Negrón, presided over the university for 48 years and died in 2011.

On May 1, 2023, the university announced that it would not offer any classes after the summer 2023 session. It ceased operations in December 2023.

== See also ==
- Education in Puerto Rico
