= 1997–98 Philippine Basketball League season =

1997–98 PBL season
- Duration: March 8, 1997 – January 17, 1998
- Teams: 7
- TV partner: Silverstar Sports (PTV)
- Season MVP: Rommel Adducul; Eric Menk
- Makati Mayor's Cup champions: Tanduay Gold Rhum Masters
- Makati Mayor's Cup runners-up: Dazz Dishwashing Paste
- All-Filipino Cup champions: Tanduay Gold Rhum Masters
- All-Filipino Cup runners-up: Agfa HDC Film

Seasons
- ← 1996 1998-99 →

The 1997–98 season of the Philippine Basketball League (PBL).

== New leadership ==
Under New Commissioner Joseller "Yeng" Guiao, the PBL games were now held at the newly built Makati Coliseum in Makati and covered on primetime TV, produced by Silverstar Sports and aired on PTV-4.

== Makati Mayor's Cup ==
=== Imports ===
Teams	Import
AMA Cybertigers	Corey Williams
Chowking Fastfood Kings	Carl Simpson / David Vanterpool
Dazz Dishwashing Paste	Rodney Smith
Red Bull Energy Drink	Larry Daniels / Kareem Hill
Springmaid Toothbrush	Eric Dailey
Tanduay Gold Rhum Masters	Craig Wise / Dennis Edwards / Marcus Timmons
Welcoat Paints	Parish Hickman / Darryl Young

=== Finals series ===
PTV-4

May 29

Tanduay Gold Rhum W, Dazz Dishwashing Paste L

Makati Coliseum, Makati

PTV-4

May 31

recap

Tanduay Gold Rhum 81, Dazz Dishwashing Paste 86

Makati Coliseum, Makati

PTV-4

June 2

recap

Tanduay Gold Rhum 92, Dazz Dishwashing Paste 79

Makati Coliseum, Makati

PTV-4

June 5

Tanduay Gold Rhum 95, Dazz Dishwashing Paste 76
Tanduay wins series, 3-1

Makati Coliseum, Makati

Tanduay Gold Rhum Masters gave their coach Alfrancis Chua his fifth PBL title and avenged their loss to Dazz coach Junel Baculi when the latter's team, then called Hapee Toothpaste, beat the former Stag Pale Pilsen, 3-1, in last year's Reinforced Conference. The Rhum Masters had their biggest lead of 22 points in Game four, 84-62, with 3:15 remaining. Dazz was handicapped with the absence of its best player Oscar Simon. Best import Marcus Timmons barely missed a triple-double of 22 points, 9 rebounds and 9 assists for Tanduay, Jomer Rubi added 15 points while ex-pro Bobby Jose and Randy Alcantara had 13 each.

== All-Filipino Cup ==
Qualified for semifinals

#	Team Standings	W	L	PCT	GB
1	Tanduay Gold Rhum Masters	8	2	.800	–-
2	Welcoat Paints	6	4	.600	2
3	Chowking Fastfood Kings	6	4	.600	2
4	Agfa HDC Films	5	5	.500	3
5	Dazz Dishwashing Paste	3	7	.300	5
6	Wilkins Mineral Water	2	8	.200	6

The PBL All-Filipino Cup opens on October 25, 1997, AMA Computer College and Springmaid didn't participate but a new ballclub Wilkins Distilled Water joined the five other teams. Red Bull decided to return to its former team name Agfa Films with Nat Canson replacing Jimmy Mariano as Agfa coach.

The top five teams enters the semifinal round. After 18 games, Tanduay Gold Rhum clinch the first finals berth with a 12-6 won-loss card, Welcoat and defending All-Filipino Cup champion Agfa were tied with 11 wins and 7 losses and will meet in a playoff to determine the Rhum Masters' opponent. Agfa Films went on to prevailed over the Paint Masters.

=== Finals series ===
PTV-4

January 7

Tanduay Gold Rhum 87, Agfa Films 79

Makati Coliseum, Makati

PTV-4

January 10

Tanduay Gold Rhum 83, Agfa Films 88

Makati Coliseum, Makati

PTV-4

January 12

Tanduay Gold Rhum 69, Agfa Films 76

Makati Coliseum, Makati

PTV-4

January 14

Tanduay Gold Rhum W, Agfa Films L

Makati Coliseum, Makati

PTV-4

January 17

Tanduay Gold Rhum 82, Agfa Films 76
Tanduay wins series, 3-2

Makati Coliseum, Makati

Tanduay came back from a 1-2 series deficit and win their 6th PBL title against Agfa HDC Films. In the deciding fifth game, Agfa was ahead, 60-53, with 8:42 left in the final quarter, but Randy Alcantara and Eric Menk scored successively to levelled the count at 66-all with 4:11 left. Agfa was a win away from retaining the All-Filipino Cup crown they won last season against this very same team after taking a 2-1 edge by winning Game three with Jimwell Torion scoring 37 points for the Film Makers.

== Individual awards ==
- All-Filipino Cup:
- Most Valuable Player: Eric Menk (Tanduay) *The first PBL player to win both MVP award and ROY honors
- Rookie of the year: Eric Menk (Tanduay)
- Mythical Selection First team:
- Eric Menk (Tanduay)
- Rommel Adducul (Chowking)
- Jomer Rubi (Tanduay)
- Henry Fernandez (Agfa)
- Renato Morano (Welcoat)
- Mythical Selection Second team:
- Danny Ildefonso (Agfa)
- Bobby Jose (Tanduay)
- Brixter Encarnacion (Chowking)
- Gilbert Demape (Welcoat)
- Alvin Magpantay (Tanduay)
- Three-point king title: Jasper Ocampo (Chowking)
- Most Improved Player: Brixter Encarnacion (Chowking)
