= 1998–99 Philippine Basketball League season =

1998–99 PBL season
- Duration: April 18, 1998 – January 21, 1999
- Teams: 7
- TV partner: Silverstar Sports (PTV)
- Season MVP: Eric Menk; Eric Menk
- 1st Centennial Cup champions: Tanduay Centennial Rhum Masters
- 1st Centennial Cup runners-up: Batang Red Bull Energy Kings
- 2nd Centennial Cup champions: Dr.J Rubbing Alcohol
- 2nd Centennial Cup runners-up: Tanduay Gold Rhum Masters

Seasons
- ← 1997-98 1999-2000 →

The 1998–99 season of the Philippine Basketball League (PBL).

== TV coverage ==
PTV 4, in partnership with Silverstar Sports as the line producer, covered the PBL games.

== 1998 (1st) Centennial Cup ==
=== Participating teams (coach) ===
- Batang Red Bull (Nat Canson)
- Dr.J Rubbing Alcohol (Leo Isaac)
- Zest-O Juice Drink (Mollet Pineda)
- Welcoat Paints (Gabby Velasco)
- Tanduay Centennial Rhum (Alfrancis Chua)
- Chowking Oriental Fastfood (Arturo Cristobal)
- Wilkins Distilled Water (Arlene Rodriguez)

=== Finals series ===
PTV-4

July 2

recap

Tanduay Centennial Rhum 70, Batang Red Bull 62

Makati Coliseum, Makati

PTV-4

July 4

recap

Tanduay Centennial Rhum 91, Batang Red Bull 75

Makati Coliseum, Makati

PTV-4

July 6

Tanduay Centennial Rhum 71, Batang Red Bull 65
Tanduay wins series, 3-0

Makati Coliseum, Makati

Tanduay scored a 3–0 sweep over Red Bull in the 1st Yakult-PBL Centennial Cup finals. The Rhum Masters clinch the title with a 71-65 victory in Game three.

== 1998-99 (2nd) Centennial Cup ==
=== Participating teams (coach) ===
- Batang Red Bull (Nat Canson)
- Dr.J Rubbing Alcohol/ANA Water Dispenser (Leo Isaac)
- Welcoat Paints (Gabby Velasco)
- Tanduay Centennial Rhum (Alfrancis Chua)
- Chowking Oriental Fastfood (Leo Austria)
- Blu Detergent *New team
- Paralux Auto Paints *New team

=== Finals series ===
PTV-4

January 11

Dr.J-ANA 62, Tanduay Gold Rhum 61

Makati Coliseum, Makati

PTV-4

January 14

Dr.J-ANA 75, Tanduay Gold Rhum 66

Makati Coliseum, Makati

PTV-4

January 16

Dr.J-ANA 56, Tanduay Gold Rhum 77

Makati Coliseum, Makati

PTV-4

January 18

Dr.J-ANA 57, Tanduay Gold Rhum 62

Makati Coliseum, Makati

PTV-4

January 21

Dr.J-ANA 62, Tanduay Gold Rhum 59
Dr.J-ANA wins series, 3-2

Makati Coliseum, Makati

Tanduay Rhum Masters strung up 18 straight victories (18-0) in the 2nd Yakult-PBL Centennial Cup, before newcomer Blu Detergents halted their winning run. Tanduay wound up with a 19–1 win–loss record going into the finals.

Dr.J/ANA Water Dispenser won their first-ever PBL crown with a 3-2 series win over Tanduay and denied the Rhum Masters on what could have been a grand exit for the multi-titled ballclub as the Lucio Tan franchise leaped to the pro ranks.

== All-Star game ==
A PBL All-Star game was held in December 1998, Tanduay's Eric Menk leads the PBL-UAAP selection while Asi Taulava of Blu Detergent beef up the PBL-NCAA Hapee selection. The North vs South All-Star game had Yakult-South being coach by Leo Austria while the North All-Stars was handled by Gabby Velasco.

== Women's Philippine Basketball League (WPBL) ==
PBL Commissioner Yeng Guiao came up with the formation of the first-ever women's league in the PBL in mid-October to spice up the 2nd conference, among the teams which participated in the Women's Philippine Basketball League are Dr J/Ana Dispenser, Dreyers Ice Cream, Welcoat Paints, Ever Bilena, Tanduay, Chowking and Paralux/Ironcon. Notable WPBL cagebelles were former RP team members Mitchell Jimenez (Paralux), Ana Marie Tinasas (Dreyers), Joanna Franquelli (Ana Dispenser), Mary Ellen Caasi and Cherry Maralit (Welcoat), and four-time SEA games campaigner and silver medal winning-RP team in the Chiang Mai games, Julie Amos of Ever Bilena.

On December 28, 1998, Ever Bilena won the first Birch Tree-Women's PBL crown with a nail-biting 52-51 victory over Chowking at the Makati Coliseum.
