= RP-Hapee Toothpaste =

2002 RP-Hapee Toothpaste season
- Head coach: Eric Altamirano

Governors' Cup results
- Record: 4–7 (36.4%)
- Place: N/A
- Playoff finish: N/A

RP-Hapee Toothpaste seasons

The 2002 Philippine Team-Hapee Toothpaste is one of the two teams which sponsored a national pool that played in the 2002 PBA Governors' Cup as part of the league's continued support to the Philippine men's national basketball team that will compete in the 2002 Asian Games in Busan, South Korea. A total of 30 players were picked and divided into two groups.

National team coach Jong Uichico serves as the monitoring body on the overall progress of the two training squads. The Hapee team were composed of 14 PBA players and one player, Rommel Adducul, from the MBA.

== Roster ==
RP-Hapee Toothpaste roster
Players
Coaches

| Pos. | No. | Nat. | Name | Ht. | Wt. |
|---|---|---|---|---|---|---|
| G | 14 | (Philippines) | Johnny Abarrientos | 5 ft 8 in (1.73 m) | | Coca Cola Tigers |
| C | | (Philippines) | Rommel Adducul | 6 ft 6 in (1.98 m) | | Batangas Blades |
| C | 13 | (Philippines) | Marlou Aquino | 6 ft 9 in (2.06 m) | | Sta. Lucia Realtors |
| F | 20 | (Philippines) | Don Camaso | 6 ft 6 in (1.98 m) | | Talk 'N Text Phone Pals |
| G | 22 | (United States) | Jeffrey Cariaso | 6 ft 2 in (1.88 m) | | Coca Cola Tigers |
| G | 40 | (United States) | Noy Castillo | 6 ft 0 in (1.83 m) | | Purefoods TJ Hotdogs |
| C | 32 | (Philippines) | EJ Feihl | 7 ft 1 in (2.16 m) | | Barangay Ginebra Kings |
| G | 6 | (Philippines) | Boyet Fernandez | 5 ft 8 in (1.73 m) | | Purefoods TJ Hotdogs |
| F | 4 | (United States) | Davonn Harp | 6 ft 7 in (2.01 m) | | Batang Red Bull Thunder |
| F | 99 | (United States) | Rudy Hatfield | 6 ft 3 in (1.91 m) | | Coca Cola Tigers |
| F/C | 10 | (Philippines) | Danny Ildefonso | 6 ft 6 in (1.98 m) | | San Miguel Beermen |
| F | 7 | (Australia) | Mick Pennisi | 6 ft 11 in (2.11 m) | | Batang Red Bull Thunder |
| G | | (Philippines) | Renren Ritualo | 6 ft 1 in (1.85 m) | | FedEx Express |
| C | 52 | (United States) | Andy Seigle | 6 ft 10 in (2.08 m) | | Purefoods TJ Hotdogs |
| F | 42 | (United States) | Danny Seigle | 6 ft 6 in (1.98 m) | | San Miguel Beermen |

Head coach

- Eric Altamirano

Legend

- (C) Team captain
- Injured
